= Athletics at the 1998 Central American and Caribbean Games – Results =

These are the full results of the athletics competition at the 1998 Central American and Caribbean Games which took place between 15 and 22 August 1998, at Estadio José Pachencho Romero in Maracaibo, Venezuela.

== Men's results ==
=== 100 metres ===
Heats – 15 August
Wind:
Heat 1: ? m/s, Heat 2: 0.0 m/s, Heat 3: -2.1 m/s, Heat 4: -1.3 m/s, Heat 5: +0.4 m/s

| Rank | Heat | Name | Nationality | Time | Notes |
|---|---|---|---|---|---|
| 1 | 4 | Ronald Promesse | Saint Lucia | 10.41 | Q |
| 2 | 4 | Nathanaël Esprit | Netherlands Antilles | 10.43 | Q |
| 3 | 2 | Freddy Mayola | Cuba | 10.46 | Q |
| 4 | 2 | Renward Wells | Bahamas | 10.51 | Q |
| 5 | 3 | Luis Pérez-Rionda | Cuba | 10.55 | Q |
| 6 | 2 | Niconnor Alexander | Trinidad and Tobago | 10.57 | Q |
| 7 | 5 | Nigel Jones | Grenada | 10.58 | Q |
| 8 | 2 | Slyn Guzman | Venezuela | 10.60 | Q |
| 9 | 2 | Carlos Villaseñor | Mexico | 10.61 | q |
| 10 | 3 | Garth Robinson | Jamaica | 10.62 | Q |
| 11 | 1 | Obadele Thompson | Barbados | 10.63 | Q |
| 12 | 5 | Roger Smith | Cayman Islands | 10.65 | Q |
| 13 | 3 | Jermain Esprit | Netherlands Antilles | 10.66 | Q |
| 14 | 1 | Claston Reid | Jamaica | 10.67 | Q |
| 15 | 5 | Jhonatan Medina | Venezuela | 10.68 | Q |
| 16 | 4 | Dwight Ferguson | Bahamas | 10.69 | Q |
| 16 | 5 | Kurvin Wallace | Saint Kitts and Nevis | 10.69 | Q |
| 18 | 1 | Antonio Serpas | El Salvador | 10.70 | Q |
| 18 | 2 | Kim Collins | Saint Kitts and Nevis | 10.70 | q |
| 20 | 4 | Rolando Blanco | Guatemala | 10.72 | Q |
| 21 | 1 | Adalberto Mendez | Dominican Republic | 10.73 | Q |
| 22 | 4 | Félix Omar Fernández | Puerto Rico | 10.74 | q |
| 23 | 3 | Peter Frederick | Trinidad and Tobago | 10.77 | Q |
| 24 | 5 | Agner Muñoz | Puerto Rico | 10.81 | q |
| 25 | 2 | Tariq Hewey | Bermuda | 10.85 | |
| 26 | 1 | Oscar Meneses | Guatemala | 10.89 | |
| 27 | 4 | Byron Quamina | Saint Vincent and the Grenadines | 10.95 | |
| 28 | 1 | Adrian McLaughlin | Cayman Islands | 11.12 | |
| 29 | 1 | Terry Neville | Dominica | 11.15 | |
| 30 | 4 | Egberto Thompson | Belize | 11.2 | |
| 31 | 5 | Jean-Ives Benoit | Haiti | 11.37 | |
| 32 | 3 | Michael McKoy | Belize | 11.57 | |
| 33 | 3 | Ruben Benitez | El Salvador | 14.60 | |
| | 3 | Frantz Valbona | Haiti | DNS | |

Semifinals – 15 August
Wind:
Heat 1: +2.3 m/s, Heat 2: +4.7 m/s, Heat 3: +2.3 m/s

| Rank | Heat | Name | Nationality | Time | Notes |
|---|---|---|---|---|---|
| 1 | 1 | Luis Pérez-Rionda | Cuba | 10.28 | Q |
| 2 | 3 | Obadele Thompson | Barbados | 10.33 | Q |
| 3 | 3 | Garth Robinson | Jamaica | 10.36 | Q |
| 4 | 2 | Nathanaël Esprit | Netherlands Antilles | 10.37 | Q |
| 4 | 3 | Freddy Mayola | Cuba | 10.37 | q |
| 6 | 1 | Nigel Jones | Grenada | 10.42 | Q |
| 7 | 2 | Ronald Promesse | Saint Lucia | 10.44 | Q |
| 8 | 1 | Dwight Ferguson | Bahamas | 10.45 | q |
| 8 | 2 | Renward Wells | Bahamas | 10.45 | |
| 10 | 1 | Claston Reid | Jamaica | 10.47 | |
| 10 | 3 | Jermain Esprit | Netherlands Antilles | 10.47 | |
| 12 | 3 | Niconnor Alexander | Trinidad and Tobago | 10.49 | |
| 13 | 2 | Antonio Serpas | El Salvador | 10.50 | |
| 14 | 1 | Slyn Guzman | Venezuela | 10.55 | |
| 15 | 1 | Peter Frederick | Trinidad and Tobago | 10.57 | |
| 16 | 2 | Rolando Blanco | Guatemala | 10.59 | |
| 17 | 2 | Jhonatan Medina | Venezuela | 10.62 | |
| 18 | 1 | Roger Smith | Cayman Islands | 10.64 | |
| 19 | 2 | Adalberto Mendez | Dominican Republic | 10.65 | |
| 20 | 3 | Félix Omar Fernández | Puerto Rico | 10.66 | |
| 21 | 3 | Carlos Villaseñor | Mexico | 10.72 | |
| 22 | 2 | Agner Muñoz | Puerto Rico | 10.73 | |
| 23 | 1 | Kim Collins | Saint Kitts and Nevis | 10.77 | |
| 24 | 3 | Kurvin Wallace | Saint Kitts and Nevis | 10.83 | |

Final – 16 August
Wind: -1.7 m/s

| Rank | Lane | Name | Nationality | Time | Notes |
|---|---|---|---|---|---|
| 1st place, gold medalist(s) | 5 | Obadele Thompson | Barbados | 10.20 | |
| 2nd place, silver medalist(s) | 2 | Dwight Ferguson | Bahamas | 10.43 | |
| 3rd place, bronze medalist(s) | 4 | Luis Pérez-Rionda | Cuba | 10.44 | |
| 4 | 3 | Nathanaël Esprit | Netherlands Antilles | 10.49 | |
| 5 | 7 | Freddy Mayola | Cuba | 10.50 | |
| 6 | 1 | Nigel Jones | Grenada | 10.56 | |
| 7 | 8 | Ronald Promesse | Saint Lucia | 10.60 | |
| 8 | 6 | Garth Robinson | Jamaica | 10.67 | |

=== 200 metres ===
Heats – 17 August
Wind:
Heat 1: +2.7 m/s, Heat 2: +1.7 m/s, Heat 3: +2.2 m/s

| Rank | Heat | Name | Nationality | Time | Notes |
|---|---|---|---|---|---|
| 1 | 1 | Misael Ortiz | Cuba | 20.88 | Q |
| 2 | 2 | Juan Pedro Toledo | Mexico | 20.95 | Q |
| 3 | 2 | Julieon Raeburn | Trinidad and Tobago | 20.97 | Q |
| 4 | 3 | Iván García | Cuba | 21.00 | Q |
| 5 | 1 | Andrew Tynes | Bahamas | 21.11 | Q |
| 6 | 2 | Ronald Promesse | Saint Lucia | 21.18 | q |
| 7 | 3 | Nathanaël Esprit | Netherlands Antilles | 21.22 | Q |
| 8 | 1 | Peter Frederick | Trinidad and Tobago | 21.32 | q |
| 9 | 3 | Francisco Cornelio | Dominican Republic | 21.35 | |
| 10 | 1 | N'Kosie Barnes | Antigua and Barbuda | 21.48 | |
| 11 | 1 | Gabriel Burnett | Barbados | 21.52 | |
| 12 | 2 | Kurvin Wallace | Saint Kitts and Nevis | 21.56 | |
| 13 | 1 | José Carabalí | Venezuela | 21.58 | |
| 14 | 3 | Jorge Richardson | Puerto Rico | 21.62 | |
| 15 | 2 | Roger Smith | Cayman Islands | 21.77 | |
| 16 | 3 | Bruce Swan | Grenada | 21.80 | |
| 17 | 1 | David Hamil | Cayman Islands | 22.08 | |
| 18 | 3 | Tariq Hewey | Bermuda | 22.37 | |
| 18 | 3 | Kim Collins | Saint Kitts and Nevis | 22.37 | |
| 20 | 1 | Alberto Wade | Belize | 22.38 | |
| 21 | 2 | Garth Robinson | Jamaica | 22.42 | |
| 22 | 2 | Terry Neville | Dominica | 22.60 | |
| 23 | 2 | Jean-Ives Benoit | Haiti | 23.27 | |
| | 3 | Kenmore Hughes | Antigua and Barbuda | DNS | |

Final – 19 August
Wind: +1.9 m/s

| Rank | Lane | Name | Nationality | Time | Notes |
|---|---|---|---|---|---|
| 1st place, gold medalist(s) | 6 | Juan Pedro Toledo | Mexico | 20.46 | |
| 2nd place, silver medalist(s) | 5 | Misael Ortiz | Cuba | 20.75 | |
| 3rd place, bronze medalist(s) | 3 | Iván García | Cuba | 20.81 | |
| 4 | 8 | Nathanaël Esprit | Netherlands Antilles | 20.92 | |
| 5 | 4 | Julieon Raeburn | Trinidad and Tobago | 20.93 | |
| 6 | 7 | Ronald Promesse | Saint Lucia | 21.04 | |
| 7 | 1 | Andrew Tynes | Bahamas | 21.24 | |
| 8 | 2 | Peter Frederick | Trinidad and Tobago | 21.44 | |

=== 400 metres ===
Heats – 15 August

| Rank | Heat | Name | Nationality | Time | Notes |
|---|---|---|---|---|---|
| 1 | 3 | Carlos Santa | Dominican Republic | 46.41 | Q |
| 2 | 1 | Troy McIntosh | Bahamas | 46.50 | Q |
| 3 | 1 | Juan Pedro Toledo | Mexico | 46.66 | Q |
| 4 | 3 | Alejandro Cárdenas | Mexico | 46.98 | Q |
| 5 | 4 | Edel Hevia | Cuba | 47.03 | Q |
| 6 | 4 | Davian Clarke | Jamaica | 47.19 | Q |
| 7 | 4 | Alleyne Francique | Grenada | 47.30 | Q |
| 8 | 4 | Kenmore Hughes | Antigua and Barbuda | 47.35 | q |
| 9 | 2 | Roxbert Martin | Jamaica | 47.37 | Q |
| 10 | 3 | Dominic Johnson | Saint Lucia | 47.40 | Q |
| 11 | 2 | Geraldo Peralta | Dominican Republic | 47.44 | Q |
| 12 | 2 | Luis Daniel Soto | Puerto Rico | 47.45 | Q |
| 13 | 2 | N'Kosie Barnes | Antigua and Barbuda | 47.66 | q |
| 14 | 4 | William Hernández | Venezuela | 47.68 | q |
| 15 | 3 | Miguel Cosme | Puerto Rico | 47.69 | q |
| 16 | 3 | Georkis Vera | Cuba | 47.80 | |
| 17 | 1 | Ángel Núñez | Venezuela | 48.59 | Q |
| 18 | 1 | Bruce Swan | Grenada | 48.87 | |
| 19 | 1 | Mario Todman | British Virgin Islands | 49.31 | |
| 20 | 2 | Fabian Rolling | Barbados | 49.72 | |
| 21 | 3 | Blyden Brudy | Saint Kitts and Nevis | 51.00 | |
| 22 | 2 | Benton Brudy | Saint Kitts and Nevis | 51.35 | |
| 23 | 2 | Alberto Wade | Belize | 52.34 | |
| 24 | 4 | Nicholas McField | Cayman Islands | 52.74 | |
| | 1 | Roger Jordan | Barbados | DNS | |
| | 3 | Neil de Silva | Trinidad and Tobago | DNS | |

Semifinals – 15 August

| Rank | Heat | Name | Nationality | Time | Notes |
|---|---|---|---|---|---|
| 1 | 1 | Troy McIntosh | Bahamas | 45.58 | Q |
| 2 | 1 | Davian Clarke | Jamaica | 45.83 | Q |
| 3 | 2 | Roxbert Martin | Jamaica | 46.15 | Q |
| 4 | 1 | Alejandro Cárdenas | Mexico | 46.40 | Q |
| 5 | 2 | Juan Pedro Toledo | Mexico | 46.54 | Q |
| 6 | 1 | Edel Hevia | Cuba | 46.90 | q |
| 7 | 2 | Carlos Santa | Dominican Republic | 46.92 | Q |
| 8 | 2 | Kenmore Hughes | Antigua and Barbuda | 47.68 | q |
| 9 | 2 | Dominic Johnson | Saint Lucia | 47.85 | |
| 10 | 2 | Alleyne Francique | Grenada | 47.96 | |
| 11 | 2 | Ángel Núñez | Venezuela | 48.01 | |
| 12 | 1 | Luis Daniel Soto | Puerto Rico | 48.26 | |
| 13 | 2 | Miguel Cosme | Puerto Rico | 48.63 | |
| 14 | 1 | William Hernández | Venezuela | 50.43 | |
| | 1 | Geraldo Peralta | Dominican Republic | DNF | |
| | 1 | N'Kosie Barnes | Antigua and Barbuda | DNS | |

Final – 16 August

| Rank | Lane | Name | Nationality | Time | Notes |
|---|---|---|---|---|---|
| 1st place, gold medalist(s) | 5 | Troy McIntosh | Bahamas | 44.84 | |
| 2nd place, silver medalist(s) | 4 | Roxbert Martin | Jamaica | 45.11 | |
| 3rd place, bronze medalist(s) | 1 | Alejandro Cárdenas | Mexico | 45.22 | |
| 4 | 3 | Davian Clarke | Jamaica | 45.31 | |
| 5 | 8 | Carlos Santa | Dominican Republic | 46.13 | |
| 6 | 6 | Juan Pedro Toledo | Mexico | 46.17 | |
| 7 | 7 | Edel Hevia | Cuba | 47.17 | |
| 8 | 2 | Kenmore Hughes | Antigua and Barbuda | 47.70 | |

=== 800 metres ===
Heats – 17 August

| Rank | Heat | Name | Nationality | Time | Notes |
|---|---|---|---|---|---|
| 1 | 3 | Norberto Téllez | Cuba | 1:49.51 | Q |
| 2 | 2 | Marvin Watts | Jamaica | 1:49.54 | Q |
| 2 | 3 | Chris Brown | Bahamas | 1:49.54 | Q |
| 4 | 2 | Jean-Marc Destine | Haiti | 1:50.38 | Q |
| 5 | 1 | Ereisis Torres | Cuba | 1:50.39 | Q |
| 6 | 1 | Mark Olivo | Venezuela | 1:50.43 | Q |
| 7 | 3 | Ian Godwin | Saint Kitts and Nevis | 1:50.66 | q |
| 8 | 1 | Dale Jones | Antigua and Barbuda | 1:50.72 | q |
| 9 | 2 | Juan Navarro | Venezuela | 1:51.15 | |
| 10 | 2 | Gregory Chipman | Bahamas | 1:51.35 | |
| 11 | 3 | Charles Reyes | Dominican Republic | 1:51.44 | |
| 12 | 1 | Adith Figueroa | Puerto Rico | 1:51.74 | |
| 13 | 3 | Rohan Alexis | Grenada | 1:53.26 | |
| 14 | 3 | Nickie Peters | Saint Vincent and the Grenadines | 1:53.62 | |
| 15 | 2 | César Arias | El Salvador | 1:54.38 | |
| 16 | 2 | Alleyne Francique | Grenada | 1:54.68 | |
| 17 | 1 | Ronald Arias | El Salvador | 1:56.92 | |
| 18 | 3 | Earon Rosaria | Netherlands Antilles | 1:57.62 | |
| 19 | 1 | William Bohlke | United States Virgin Islands | 1:58.61 | |
| 20 | 2 | Timothy Caines | Saint Kitts and Nevis | 2:04.15 | |

Final – 19 August

| Rank | Name | Nationality | Time | Notes |
|---|---|---|---|---|
| 1st place, gold medalist(s) | Norberto Téllez | Cuba | 1:49.71 | |
| 2nd place, silver medalist(s) | Ereisis Torres | Cuba | 1:51.39 | |
| 3rd place, bronze medalist(s) | Mark Olivo | Venezuela | 1:51.68 | |
| 4 | Jean-Marc Destine | Haiti | 1:52.30 | |
| 5 | Ian Godwin | Saint Kitts and Nevis | 1:52.69 | |
| 6 | Dale Jones | Antigua and Barbuda | 1:53.07 | |
| 7 | Chris Brown | Bahamas | 1:54.03 | |
| 8 | Marvin Watts | Jamaica | 2:00.77 | |

=== 1500 metres ===
16 August

| Rank | Name | Nationality | Time | Notes |
|---|---|---|---|---|
| 1st place, gold medalist(s) | Héctor Torres | Mexico | 3:46.06 | |
| 2nd place, silver medalist(s) | Emigdio Delgado | Venezuela | 3:47.71 | |
| 3rd place, bronze medalist(s) | Pablo Olmedo | Mexico | 3:48.19 | |
| 4 | Terrance Armstrong | Bermuda | 3:48.93 | |
| 5 | Steve Green | Jamaica | 3:49.57 | |
| 6 | Omar Torres | Cuba | 3:50.43 | |
| 7 | Ereisis Torres | Cuba | 3:50.78 | |
| 8 | José Gregorio López | Venezuela | 3:51.71 | |
| 9 | Alexander Greaux | Puerto Rico | 3:52.12 | |
| 10 | Linton McKenzie | Jamaica | 3:52.49 | |
| 11 | Dale Jones | Antigua and Barbuda | 3:56.75 | |
| 12 | Zepherinus Joseph | Saint Lucia | 3:57.33 | |
| 13 | Nickie Peters | Saint Vincent and the Grenadines | 3:58.27 | |
| 14 | Ronald Arias | El Salvador | 3:58.62 | |
| 15 | César Arias | El Salvador | 4:03.16 | |

=== 5000 metres ===
19 August

| Rank | Name | Nationality | Time | Notes |
|---|---|---|---|---|
| 1st place, gold medalist(s) | Pablo Olmedo | Mexico | 14:01.85 | |
| 2nd place, silver medalist(s) | Freddy González | Venezuela | 14:04.77 | |
| 3rd place, bronze medalist(s) | Germán Beltrán | Venezuela | 14:05.15 | |
| 4 | Isaac García | Mexico | 14:07.59 | |
| 5 | Juan Carlos Gutiérrez | Colombia | 14:15.49 | |
| 6 | Jacinto Rodríguez | Puerto Rico | 14:22.09 | |
| 7 | Jhonny Loría | Costa Rica | 14:31.83 | |
| 8 | Pamenos Ballantyne | Saint Vincent and the Grenadines | 14:36.84 | |
| 9 | Zepherinus Joseph | Saint Lucia | 15:06.57 | |
| 10 | Terrance Armstrong | Bermuda | 15:06.62 | |
| 11 | José Antonio Morales | Guatemala | 15:10.23 | |
| 12 | Omar Brooks | Jamaica | 15:22.89 | |
| 13 | Andrew Smith | Guyana | 15:24.70 | |
| | Iván Gómez | Guatemala | DNF | |

=== 10,000 metres ===
15 August

| Rank | Name | Nationality | Time | Notes |
|---|---|---|---|---|
| 1st place, gold medalist(s) | Germán Beltrán | Venezuela | 29:49.06 | |
| 2nd place, silver medalist(s) | Julio César Valle | Mexico | 29:53.40 | |
| 3rd place, bronze medalist(s) | Gabino Apolonio | Mexico | 30:11.29 | |
| 4 | Herder Vázquez | Colombia | 30:28.95 | |
| 5 | Pamenos Ballantyne | Saint Vincent and the Grenadines | 30:29.91 | |
| 6 | Alejandro Semprum | Venezuela | 30:31.00 | |
| 7 | Iván Gómez | Guatemala | 31:03.00 | |
| 8 | Andrew Smith | Guyana | 33:22.07 | |
| 9 | Richard Rodriguez | Aruba | 33:23.01 | |

=== Marathon ===
22 August

| Rank | Name | Nationality | Time | Notes |
|---|---|---|---|---|
| 1st place, gold medalist(s) | Juan Camacho | Mexico | 2:25:25 | |
| 2nd place, silver medalist(s) | William Ramírez | Colombia | 2:25:33 | |
| 3rd place, bronze medalist(s) | Rubén Maza | Venezuela | 2:27:46 | |
| 4 | Alexis Cuba | Cuba | 2:30:26 | |
| 5 | Eliseo García | Mexico | 2:31:26 | |
| 6 | Carlos Tarazona | Venezuela | 2:32:40 | |
| 7 | Luis Martínez | Guatemala | 2:39:14 | |
| 8 | William Aguirre | Nicaragua | 2:40:05 | |
| 9 | Ignacio Cuba | Cuba | 2:57:35 | |
| | Alirio Carrasco | Colombia | DNF | |
| | Harold Sanon | Haiti | DNS | |

=== 110 metres hurdles ===
Heats – 15 August
Wind:
Heat 1: +3.0 m/s, Heat 2: +3.9 m/s

| Rank | Heat | Name | Nationality | Time | Notes |
|---|---|---|---|---|---|
| 1 | 1 | Steve Brown | Trinidad and Tobago | 13.52 | Q |
| 2 | 1 | Erik Batte | Cuba | 13.55 | Q |
| 3 | 2 | Anier García | Cuba | 13.67 | Q |
| 4 | 2 | Greg Hines | Jamaica | 13.81 | Q |
| 5 | 1 | Gabriel Burnett | Barbados | 13.89 | Q |
| 6 | 1 | Matthew Love | Jamaica | 13.99 | q |
| 7 | 2 | Stephen Jones | Barbados | 14.17 | Q |
| 8 | 2 | Kerl Chai-Hong | Trinidad and Tobago | 14.39 | q |
| 9 | 1 | Joseph Rigaud | Haiti | 15.63 | |
| | 2 | Wagner Marseille | Haiti | DNS | |

Final – 16 August

Wind: +1.5 m/s

| Rank | Lane | Name | Nationality | Time | Notes |
|---|---|---|---|---|---|
| 1st place, gold medalist(s) | 5 | Anier García | Cuba | 13.27 | GR |
| 2nd place, silver medalist(s) | 4 | Steve Brown | Trinidad and Tobago | 13.56 | |
| 3rd place, bronze medalist(s) | 3 | Erik Batte | Cuba | 13.84 | |
| 4 | 6 | Greg Hines | Jamaica | 13.87 | |
| 5 | 1 | Gabriel Burnett | Barbados | 13.95 | |
| 6 | 7 | Matthew Love | Jamaica | 14.01 | |
| | 8 | Stephen Jones | Barbados | DNF | |
| | 2 | Kerl Chai-Hong | Trinidad and Tobago | DQ | |

=== 400 metres hurdles ===
Heats – 17 August

| Rank | Heat | Name | Nationality | Time | Notes |
|---|---|---|---|---|---|
| 1 | 1 | Victor Houston | Barbados | 50.23 | Q |
| 2 | 2 | Dinsdale Morgan | Jamaica | 50.29 | Q |
| 3 | 1 | Kemel Thompson | Jamaica | 50.30 | Q |
| 4 | 2 | Emilio Valle | Cuba | 50.37 | Q |
| 5 | 2 | Domingo Cordero | Puerto Rico | 50.42 | Q |
| 6 | 1 | Jaciel Zamora | Cuba | 51.12 | Q |
| 7 | 1 | Óscar Juanz | Mexico | 51.15 | q |
| 8 | 2 | Llimy Rivas | Colombia | 51.16 | q |
| 9 | 2 | José Turbay | Venezuela | 51.81 | |
| 10 | 1 | Luiggi Llanos | Puerto Rico | 55.28 | |

Final – 19 August

| Rank | Lane | Name | Nationality | Time | Notes |
|---|---|---|---|---|---|
| 1st place, gold medalist(s) | 5 | Dinsdale Morgan | Jamaica | 48.87 | GR |
| 2nd place, silver medalist(s) | 6 | Emilio Valle | Cuba | 49.66 | |
| 3rd place, bronze medalist(s) | 3 | Kemel Thompson | Jamaica | 49.67 | |
| 4 | 4 | Victor Houston | Barbados | 50.05 | |
| 5 | 8 | Jaciel Zamora | Cuba | 50.52 | |
| 6 | 1 | Domingo Cordero | Puerto Rico | 50.62 | |
| 7 | 7 | Óscar Juanz | Mexico | 50.79 | |
| 8 | 2 | Llimy Rivas | Colombia | 50.82 | |

=== 3000 metres steeplechase ===
20 August

| Rank | Name | Nationality | Time | Notes |
|---|---|---|---|---|
| 1st place, gold medalist(s) | Salvador Miranda | Mexico | 8:41.70 | |
| 2nd place, silver medalist(s) | Néstor Nieves | Venezuela | 8:43.34 | |
| 3rd place, bronze medalist(s) | Daniel Torres | Mexico | 8:46.44 | |
| 4 | Romelio Bergolla | Cuba | 8:53.13 | |
| 5 | Felix Ladera | Venezuela | 8:53.52 | |
| 6 | Jhonny Loría | Costa Rica | 8:53.56 | |
| | Alexander Greaux | Puerto Rico | DNF | |

=== 4 × 100 metres relay ===
Heats – 17 August

| Rank | Heat | Nation | Athletes | Time | Notes |
|---|---|---|---|---|---|
| 1 | 2 | Cuba | Alfredo García, Iván García, Misael Ortiz, Luis Pérez | 39.24 | Q |
| 2 | 1 | Jamaica | Garth Robinson, Patrick Jarrett, Linton McKenzie, Clarkson Reid | 39.61 | Q |
| 3 | 2 | Bahamas | Iram Lewis, Andrew Tynes, Renward Wells, Joseph Styles | 39.65 | Q |
| 4 | 1 | Trinidad and Tobago | Niconnor Alexander, Steve Brown, Peter Fredericks, Julian Raeburn | 40.29 | Q |
| 5 | 2 | Dominican Republic | Carlos Santa, Adalberto Mendez, Francisco Cornelio, Raimundo Sido | 40.30 | Q |
| 6 | 1 | Puerto Rico | Carlos Santos, Agner Muñoz, Félix Omar Fernández, Jorge Richardson | 40.85 | Q |
| 7 | 2 | Saint Kitts and Nevis | Cedric Francis, Kurvin Wallace, Irvin Browne, Kim Collins | 41.17 | q |
| 8 | 2 | Cayman Islands | Adrian McLaughlin, Nicholas McField, David Hamil, Roger Smith | 41.26 | q |
| | 1 | Netherlands Antilles | Nathanaël Esprit, Chris Raphaela, John Duzant, Jermain Esprit | DNF | |
| | 1 | Guatemala | José Tinoco, Rolando Blanco, Oscar Meneses, José Haroldo Meneses | DQ | |
| | 2 | Venezuela | José Carabalí, Slyn Guzman, Jhonatan Medina, Nilson Palacios | DQ | |

Final – 19 August

| Rank | Lane | Team | Name | Time | Notes |
|---|---|---|---|---|---|
| 1st place, gold medalist(s) | 4 | Cuba | Alfredo García, Misael Ortiz, Iván García, Luis Pérez | 38.79 | |
| 2nd place, silver medalist(s) | 5 | Jamaica | Garth Robinson, Patrick Jarrett, Leon Gordon, Clarkson Reid | 39.04 | |
| 3rd place, bronze medalist(s) | 3 | Bahamas | Renward Wells, Andrew Tynes, Iram Lewis, Joseph Styles | 39.54 | |
| 4 | 6 | Trinidad and Tobago | Niconnor Alexander, Steve Brown, Peter Fredericks, Julian Raeburn | 39.65 | |
| 5 | 7 | Puerto Rico | Carlos Santos, Agner Muñoz, Félix Omar Fernández, Jorge Richardson | 40.54 | |
| 6 | 1 | Dominican Republic | Raimundo Sido, Adalberto Mendez, Carlos Santa, Francisco Cornelio | 40.93 | |
| | 8 | Cayman Islands | Adrian McLaughlin, Nicholas McField, David Hamil, Roger Smith | DNF | |
| | 2 | Saint Kitts and Nevis | | DNS | |

=== 4 × 400 metres relay ===
20 August

| Rank | Lane | Team | Name | Time | Notes |
|---|---|---|---|---|---|
| 1st place, gold medalist(s) | 5 | Cuba | Omar Mena, Jorge Crusellas, Edel Hevia, Norberto Téllez | 3:03.18 | |
| 2nd place, silver medalist(s) | 3 | Jamaica | Michael McDonald, Greg Haughton, Gregory Hines, Davian Clarke | 3:03.26 | |
| 3rd place, bronze medalist(s) | 4 | Bahamas | Avard Moncur, Carl Oliver, Chris Brown, Dennis Darling | 3:04.16 | |
| 4 | 6 | Mexico | Raymundo Escalante, Juan Pedro Toledo, Óscar Juanz, Alejandro Cárdenas | 3:04.80 | |
| 5 | 7 | Dominican Republic | Geraldo Peralta, Carlos Santa, Francisco Cornelio, Charles Reyes | 3:08.75 | |
| 6 | 2 | Venezuela | Telvis Torres, Ángel Núñez, José Turbay, William Hernández | 3:10.66 | |
| 7 | 1 | Puerto Rico | Luis Daniel Soto, Domingo Cordero, Adith Figueroa, Miguel Cosme | 3:10.68 | |
| 8 | 8 | Saint Kitts and Nevis | B. Brudy, Alister James, Timothy Caines, Ian Godwin | 3:17.04 | |

=== 20 kilometres walk ===
15 August

| Rank | Name | Nationality | Time | Notes |
|---|---|---|---|---|
| 1st place, gold medalist(s) | Daniel García | Mexico | 1:23:32 | |
| 2nd place, silver medalist(s) | Bernardo Segura | Mexico | 1:24:31 | |
| 3rd place, bronze medalist(s) | Julio René Martínez | Guatemala | 1:25:31 | |
| 4 | Francisco Gutiérrez | Cuba | 1:26:38 | |
| 5 | Jorge Luis Pino | Cuba | 1:27:35 | |
| 6 | Orlando Díaz | Colombia | 1:28:02 | |
| 7 | Héctor Moreno | Colombia | 1:28:36 | |
| 8 | Carlos Ramones | Venezuela | 1:35:07 | |
| | Roberto Oscal | Guatemala | DNF | |

=== 50 kilometres walk ===
19 August

| Rank | Name | Nationality | Time | Notes |
|---|---|---|---|---|
| 1st place, gold medalist(s) | Ignacio Zamudio | Mexico | 3:58:15 | |
| 2nd place, silver medalist(s) | Hugo López | Guatemala | 4:06:55 | |
| 3rd place, bronze medalist(s) | Jorge Luis Pino | Cuba | 4:07:52 | |
| 4 | Julio César Urías | Guatemala | 4:18:42 | |
| 5 | Rodrigo Moreno | Colombia | 4:36:37 | |
| 6 | Rubén López | Venezuela | 4:37:53 | |
| | Miguel Ángel Rodríguez | Mexico | DNF | |
| | Francisco Gutiérrez | Cuba | DNF | |
| | Lino Páez | Venezuela | DQ | |

=== High jump ===
20 August

| Rank | Name | Nationality | 1.90 | 1.95 | 2.00 | 2.05 | 2.10 | 2.15 | 2.18 | 2.21 | 2.24 | 2.27 | 2.30 | 2.33 | 2.37 | 2.40 | Result | Notes |
|---|---|---|---|---|---|---|---|---|---|---|---|---|---|---|---|---|---|---|
| 1st place, gold medalist(s) | Javier Sotomayor | Cuba | – | – | – | – | – | – | o | – | o | – | o | – | xxo | x | 2.37 | GR |
| 2nd place, silver medalist(s) | Gilmar Mayo | Colombia | – | – | – | – | – | o | o | o | o | xo | xo | xx | | | 2.30 | |
| 3rd place, bronze medalist(s) | Julio Luciano | Dominican Republic | – | – | – | – | o | xxo | xxo | o | xxx | | | | | | 2.21 | |
| 4 | Karl Scatliffe | British Virgin Islands | – | o | o | xxo | xo | xxx | | | | | | | | | 2.10 | |
| 5 | Ronan Kane | Bermuda | o | – | xo | o | xxx | | | | | | | | | | 2.05 | |
| 6 | James Rolle | Bahamas | – | – | o | – | xxx | | | | | | | | | | 2.00 | |
| 7 | Rohanan Simons | Bermuda | – | xo | xxx | | | | | | | | | | | | 1.95 | |
| 8 | Ricky Nelson | Aruba | o | xxo | xxx | | | | | | | | | | | | 1.95 | |
| 9 | César Ballesteros | Mexico | o | – | xxx | | | | | | | | | | | | 1.95 | |
| | Troy Kemp | Bahamas | | | | | | | | | | | | | | | DNS | |
| | Vance Clarke | Saint Kitts and Nevis | | | | | | | | | | | | | | | DNS | |

=== Pole vault ===
19 August

| Rank | Name | Nationality | 4.60 | 4.70 | 4.75 | 4.80 | 4.90 | 5.00 | 5.05 | 5.10 | 5.20 | 5.30 | 5.40 | Result | Notes |
|---|---|---|---|---|---|---|---|---|---|---|---|---|---|---|---|
| 1st place, gold medalist(s) | Edgar Díaz | Puerto Rico | – | – | – | – | – | – | – | – | o | o | xxx | 5.30 | |
| 2nd place, silver medalist(s) | Ricardo Diez | Venezuela | – | – | – | – | – | o | – | xo | o | xo | xxx | 5.30 | |
| 3rd place, bronze medalist(s) | Jorge Tienda | Mexico | – | – | – | o | – | o | – | xxo | xxx | | | 5.10 | |
| 4 | Roger Borbón | Costa Rica | – | o | – | – | o | xo | xo | xxx | | | | 5.00 | |
| 5 | Luis Hidalgo | Venezuela | – | – | – | – | – | xxo | – | xxx | | | | 5.00 | |
| 6 | Arturo Perea | Puerto Rico | xo | – | xxo | – | xxo | – | xxx | | | | | 4.90 | |
| 7 | Dominic Johnson | Saint Lucia | – | xo | – | xo | | xxx | | | | | | 4.80 | |

=== Long jump ===
Qualification – 16 August
Qualification mark: 7.60 metres

| Rank | Name | Nationality | #1 | #2 | #3 | Result | Notes |
|---|---|---|---|---|---|---|---|
| 1 | James Beckford | Jamaica | 7.98 | | | 7.98 | Q |
| 2 | Iván Pedroso | Cuba | 7.93 | | | 7.93 | Q |
| 3 | Chris Wright | Bahamas | 7.53 | 5.62 | 7.85 | 7.85 | Q |
| 4 | Michael McKoy | Belize | 7.76 | | | 7.76 | Q |
| 5 | Wendell Williams | Trinidad and Tobago | 7.73 | | | 7.73 | Q |
| 6 | Joan Lino Martínez | Cuba | 7.34 | 7.68 | | 7.68 | Q |
| 7 | Dane Gaspar | Saint Lucia | 7.62 | | | 7.62 | Q |
| 8 | Lewis Asprilla | Colombia | x | 7.48 | – | 7.48 | q |
| 9 | Alberto Ortiz | Puerto Rico | 7.33 | 7.39 | – | 7.39 | q |
| 10 | Kerl Chai Hong | Trinidad and Tobago | x | 7.29 | – | 7.29 | q |
| 11 | Keita Cline | British Virgin Islands | x | x | 7.21 | 7.21 | q |
| 12 | Esteban Copland | Venezuela | 7.12 | 7.00 | | 7.12 | q |
| 13 | Atiba Tucker | Bermuda | 7.03 | 6.86 | | 7.03 | |
| 14 | Lloyd Brown | Saint Kitts and Nevis | | | | 6.78 | |
| 15 | Dominic Johnson | Saint Lucia | | | | 6.66 | |
| 16 | Alberto Wade | Belize | | | | 6.20 | |
| | José Joaquín Reyes | Venezuela | | | | DNS | |

Final – 17 August

| Rank | Name | Nationality | #1 | #2 | #3 | #4 | #5 | #6 | Result | Notes |
|---|---|---|---|---|---|---|---|---|---|---|
| 1st place, gold medalist(s) | Iván Pedroso | Cuba | x | x | 8.24 | x | 8.45 | – | 8.45 | GR |
| 2nd place, silver medalist(s) | James Beckford | Jamaica | 8.00 | 8.16 | 8.13 | 8.12 | x | x | 8.16 | |
| 3rd place, bronze medalist(s) | Joan Lino Martínez | Cuba | 7.98 | 7.90 | 7.74 | 8.09 | x | 7.73 | 8.09 | |
| 4 | Wendell Williams | Trinidad and Tobago | 7.77 | 7.65 | x | 7.73 | 7.69 | x | 7.77 | |
| 5 | Chris Wright | Bahamas | 7.53 | 7.57 | 7.27 | 7.42 | 7.39 | 7.26 | 7.57 | |
| 6 | Esteban Copland | Venezuela | 7.56 | x | x | 7.42 | 7.25 | 7.06 | 7.56 | |
| 7 | Dane Gaspar | Saint Lucia | x | 7.43 | x | 7.15 | x | x | 7.43 | |
| 8 | Kerl Chai Hong | Trinidad and Tobago | x | x | 7.31 | x | 6.97 | | 7.31 | |
| 9 | Lewis Asprilla | Colombia | x | x | 7.23 | | | | 7.23 | |
| 9 | Alberto Ortiz | Puerto Rico | x | 7.23 | x | | | | 7.23 | |
| 11 | Keita Cline | British Virgin Islands | 7.15 | x | x | | | | 7.15 | |
| | Michael McKoy | Belize | x | x | x | | | | NM | |

=== Triple jump ===
16 August

| Rank | Name | Nationality | #1 | #2 | #3 | #4 | #5 | #6 | Result | Notes |
|---|---|---|---|---|---|---|---|---|---|---|
| 1st place, gold medalist(s) | Yoelbi Quesada | Cuba | x | 16.96 | 17.18 | – | – | – | 17.18 | GR |
| 2nd place, silver medalist(s) | Aliecer Urrutia | Cuba | 16.21 | 16.33 | x | x | – | 16.53 | 16.53 | |
| 3rd place, bronze medalist(s) | Iván Salcedo | Mexico | 16.01 | x | 15.68 | 16.05 | 16.10 | x | 16.10 | |
| 4 | Jhonny Rodríguez | Venezuela | x | 14.86 | 15.18 | 15.53 | 15.70 | 16.02 | 16.02 | |
| 5 | Lloyd Brown | Saint Kitts and Nevis | 14.94 | 13.87 | 13.58 | 15.22 | 15.53 | 15.43 | 15.53 | |
| 6 | Dane Gaspar | Saint Lucia | 15.23 | 15.19 | 15.25 | r | | | 15.25 | |
| 7 | Michael McKoy | Belize | x | 13.80 | 13.70 | 15.22 | – | – | 15.22 | |
| 8 | Anthony Williams | Jamaica | 14.98 | x | x | 14.95 | 15.05 | x | 15.05 | |
| | Vance Clarke | Saint Kitts and Nevis | x | x | x | | | | NM | |
| | Jérôme Romain | Dominica | | | | | | | DNS | |

=== Shot put ===
20 August

| Rank | Name | Nationality | #1 | #2 | #3 | #4 | #5 | #6 | Result | Notes |
|---|---|---|---|---|---|---|---|---|---|---|
| 1st place, gold medalist(s) | Yojer Medina | Venezuela | 19.01 | 18.63 | 19.42 | 19.29 | 19.26 | x | 19.42 | GR |
| 2nd place, silver medalist(s) | Yosvany Obregón | Cuba | 18.30 | x | x | x | x | x | 18.30 | |
| 3rd place, bronze medalist(s) | Orlando Ibarra | Colombia | 17.41 | 17.29 | 16.62 | 17.15 | x | 17.52 | 17.52 | |
| 4 | Chris Merced | Puerto Rico | x | 17.27 | 17.35 | x | x | x | 17.35 | |
| 5 | Ronny Jiménez | Venezuela | 16.44 | 16.50 | 17.06 | 17.10 | x | x | 17.10 | |
| 6 | Jaime Comandari | El Salvador | 15.82 | x | 15.86 | 16.31 | 16.01 | x | 16.31 | |
| 7 | José Rosario | Puerto Rico | x | 15.72 | x | x | 15.73 | 15.78 | 15.78 | |
| 8 | Edson Monzón | Guatemala | 13.28 | x | 14.05 | x | 14.05 | 13.84 | 14.05 | |

=== Discus throw ===
15 August

| Rank | Name | Nationality | #1 | #2 | #3 | #4 | #5 | #6 | Result | Notes |
|---|---|---|---|---|---|---|---|---|---|---|
| 1st place, gold medalist(s) | Alexis Elizalde | Cuba | 62.27 | 62.87 | 65.00 | 58.64 | 61.35 | 59.60 | 65.00 | PB |
| 2nd place, silver medalist(s) | Frank Casañas | Cuba | 59.38 | x | x | 57.87 | x | x | 59.38 | |
| 3rd place, bronze medalist(s) | Alfredo Romero | Puerto Rico | 49.76 | 45.76 | 46.64 | 49.35 | 50.83 | x | 50.83 | |
| 4 | Herbert Rodríguez | El Salvador | 46.32 | 44.13 | 44.75 | 45.16 | x | x | 46.32 | |
| 5 | Rory Marsh | Jamaica | 42.28 | x | 42.96 | 44.34 | 39.86 | 42.99 | 44.34 | |
| 6 | Raymond Bernes | Cayman Islands | 37.90 | 37.12 | x | 37.86 | 37.52 | 36.17 | 37.90 | |
| 7 | Cliff Williams | British Virgin Islands | x | 37.10 | 37.84 | 37.43 | 33.01 | 37.38 | 37.84 | |

=== Hammer throw ===
17 August

| Rank | Name | Nationality | #1 | #2 | #3 | #4 | #5 | #6 | Result | Notes |
|---|---|---|---|---|---|---|---|---|---|---|
| 1st place, gold medalist(s) | Alberto Sánchez | Cuba | 66.93 | 74.14 | x | 73.74 | 72.66 | 74.25 | 74.25 | GR |
| 2nd place, silver medalist(s) | Yosvany Suárez | Cuba | 69.35 | – | 66.76 | – | – | – | 69.35 | |
| 3rd place, bronze medalist(s) | Guillermo Guzmán | Mexico | 63.36 | 62.60 | 61.14 | 63.78 | x | x | 63.78 | |
| 4 | Aldo Bello | Venezuela | 60.17 | 59.45 | 60.78 | 61.79 | 62.12 | 61.40 | 62.12 | |
| 5 | Santos Vega | Puerto Rico | 58.40 | x | 59.76 | x | 62.07 | x | 62.07 | |
| 6 | Israel Pérez | Puerto Rico | x | 56.08 | x | x | x | x | 56.08 | |
| 7 | Guillermo Morales | El Salvador | 53.06 | x | 52.58 | 50.47 | x | 54.78 | 54.78 | |

=== Javelin throw ===
19 August

| Rank | Name | Nationality | #1 | #2 | #3 | #4 | #5 | #6 | Result | Notes |
|---|---|---|---|---|---|---|---|---|---|---|
| 1st place, gold medalist(s) | Emeterio González | Cuba | 76.53 | 80.61 | x | 80.92 | 76.82 | 77.70 | 80.92 | |
| 2nd place, silver medalist(s) | Isbel Luaces | Cuba | 78.80 | 77.85 | 75.58 | 76.27 | 74.57 | 78.96 | 78.96 | |
| 3rd place, bronze medalist(s) | Edwin Cuesta | Venezuela | 75.41 | x | 71.95 | 71.74 | x | 70.40 | 75.41 | |
| 4 | Fernando Palomo | El Salvador | 65.23 | 72.70 | x | x | x | 61.77 | 72.70 | |
| 5 | Luis Carlos Lucumí | Colombia | 68.60 | x | 69.63 | x | 72.04 | 70.08 | 72.04 | |
| 6 | Rigoberto Calderón | Nicaragua | 64.48 | 66.50 | x | 66.40 | x | 69.41 | 69.41 | |
| 7 | Selwyn Smith | Grenada | 64.04 | 62.16 | 63.85 | 63.38 | 61.18 | x | 64.04 | |
| 8 | Ángel Marrero | Puerto Rico | 63.26 | 63.70 | 63.53 | 62.96 | 63.42 | 62.06 | 63.70 | |
| 9 | Daniel Alonso | Dominican Republic | 63.01 | 61.15 | 63.40 | | | | 63.40 | |
| 10 | Nelson Ocón | Nicaragua | x | 57.87 | 57.90 | | | | 57.90 | |
| | Joseph Rigaud | Haiti | x | x | x | | | | NM | |

=== Decathlon ===
15–16 August

The highest mark recorded in each event is highlighted in yellow

| Rank | Athlete | Nationality | 100m | LJ | SP | HJ | 400m | 110m H | DT | PV | JT | 1500m | Points | Notes |
|---|---|---|---|---|---|---|---|---|---|---|---|---|---|---|
| 1st place, gold medalist(s) | Raúl Duany | Cuba | 10.96 | 7.40 | 13.53 | 2.12 | 49.31 | 14.50 | 41.75 | 4.40 | 64.72 | 4:32.99 | 8118 | GR |
| 2nd place, silver medalist(s) | Eugenio Balanqué | Cuba | 10.76 | 6.82 | 15.05 | 1.94 | 48.67 | 14.19 | 45.12 | 4.80 | 62.40 | 4:45.99 | 8090 | |
| 3rd place, bronze medalist(s) | Diógenes Estévez | Venezuela | 11.20 | 7.22 | 12.95 | 1.94 | 50.90 | 15.51 | 39.09 | 4.00 | 51.30 | 4:35.74 | 7237 | |
| 4 | Eladio Farfan | Venezuela | 12.06 | 6.82 | 14.45 | 1.88 | 52.90 | 15.92 | 44.87 | 4.10 | 60.76 | 4:41.94 | 7116 | |
| 5 | José Antonetty | Puerto Rico | 11.29 | 7.14 | 12.13 | 1.97 | 51.81 | 17.61 | 35.69 | 4.10 | 48.82 | 5:23.98 | 6552 | |
| | Raymundo Sido | Dominican Republic | 10.87 | DNS | – | – | – | – | – | – | – | – | DNF | |
| | Llimy Rivas | Colombia | 11.17 | DNS | – | – | – | – | – | – | – | – | DNF | |

== Women's results ==
=== 100 metres ===
Heats – 15 August
Wind:
Heat 1: +3.8 m/s, Heat 2: +2.5 m/s, Heat 3: +4.4 m/s

| Rank | Heat | Name | Nationality | Time | Notes |
|---|---|---|---|---|---|
| 1 | 2 | Chandra Sturrup | Bahamas | 11.16 | Q |
| 2 | 3 | Beverly McDonald | Jamaica | 11.18 | Q |
| 3 | 1 | Liliana Allen | Mexico | 11.19 | Q |
| 4 | 1 | Tayna Lawrence | Jamaica | 11.23 | Q |
| 5 | 2 | Idalia Hechavarría | Cuba | 11.38 | Q |
| 5 | 3 | Virgen Benavides | Cuba | 11.38 | Q |
| 7 | 1 | Mirtha Brock | Colombia | 11.39 | q |
| 8 | 1 | Heather Samuel | Antigua and Barbuda | 11.52 | q |
| 9 | 2 | Heidian Harper | Trinidad and Tobago | 11.53 | |
| 10 | 2 | Emmy Ochoa | Venezuela | 11.62 | |
| 10 | 3 | Sonia Williams | Antigua and Barbuda | 11.62 | |
| 12 | 3 | Cydonie Mothersille | Cayman Islands | 11.65 | |
| 13 | 2 | Antonia Cadore | Grenada | 11.72 | |
| 14 | 1 | Yaudelis Barbosa | Venezuela | 11.98 | |
| 15 | 3 | Rita Alcazar | Panama | 12.02 | |
| 16 | 1 | Claudine Rigaud | Haiti | 12.36 | |
| | 3 | Leticia Sorto | El Salvador | DQ | |

Final – 16 August

Wind: -0.6 m/s

| Rank | Lane | Name | Nationality | Time | Notes |
|---|---|---|---|---|---|
| 1st place, gold medalist(s) | 4 | Chandra Sturrup | Bahamas | 11.14 | |
| 2nd place, silver medalist(s) | 5 | Beverly McDonald | Jamaica | 11.36 | |
| 3rd place, bronze medalist(s) | 1 | Idalia Hechavarría | Cuba | 11.53 | |
| 3rd place, bronze medalist(s) | 6 | Tayna Lawrence | Jamaica | 11.53 | |
| 5 | 8 | Virgen Benavides | Cuba | 11.66 | |
| 6 | 7 | Mirtha Brock | Colombia | 11.73 | |
| 7 | 2 | Heather Samuel | Antigua and Barbuda | 11.89 | |
| 8 | 3 | Liliana Allen | Mexico | 19.31 | |

=== 200 metres ===
Heats – 17 August
Wind:
Heat 1: -0.1 m/s, Heat 2: -1.6 m/s, Heat 3: +1.2 m/s

| Rank | Heat | Name | Nationality | Time | Notes |
|---|---|---|---|---|---|
| 1 | 3 | Beverly McDonald | Jamaica | 23.02 | Q |
| 2 | 1 | Juliet Campbell | Jamaica | 23.38 | Q |
| 3 | 3 | Virgen Benavides | Cuba | 23.53 | Q |
| 4 | 3 | Melissa Straker | Barbados | 23.64 | q |
| 5 | 2 | Felipa Palacios | Colombia | 23.66 | Q |
| 6 | 3 | Emmy Ochoa | Venezuela | 23.71 | q |
| 7 | 1 | Julia Duporty | Cuba | 23.93 | Q |
| 8 | 1 | Cydonie Mothersille | Cayman Islands | 24.16 | |
| 9 | 3 | Antonia Cadore | Grenada | 24.22 | |
| 10 | 3 | Sonia Williams | Antigua and Barbuda | 24.35 | |
| 11 | 2 | Heidian Harper | Trinidad and Tobago | 24.41 | Q |
| 12 | 2 | Joanne Durant | Barbados | 24.51 | |
| 13 | 3 | Rita Alcazar | Panama | 24.59 | |
| 14 | 2 | Leticia Sorto | El Salvador | 25.41 | |
| 15 | 2 | Claudine Rigaud | Haiti | 25.87 | |
| 16 | 1 | Macarly Macgregor | Venezuela | 26.15 | |
| | 1 | Patricia Rodríguez | Colombia | DNF | |
| | 1 | Ameerah Bello | United States Virgin Islands | DNS | |
| | 2 | Heather Samuel | Antigua and Barbuda | DNS | |

Final – 19 August

Wind: +3.6 m/s

| Rank | Lane | Name | Nationality | Time | Notes |
|---|---|---|---|---|---|
| 1st place, gold medalist(s) | 4 | Beverly McDonald | Jamaica | 22.30 | |
| 2nd place, silver medalist(s) | 6 | Juliet Campbell | Jamaica | 22.63 | |
| 3rd place, bronze medalist(s) | 3 | Felipa Palacios | Colombia | 23.07 | |
| 4 | 5 | Virgen Benavides | Cuba | 23.28 | |
| 5 | 7 | Melissa Straker | Barbados | 23.44 | |
| 6 | 1 | Emmy Ochoa | Venezuela | 23.81 | |
| 7 | 2 | Julia Duporty | Cuba | 23.95 | |
| 8 | 8 | Heidian Harper | Trinidad and Tobago | 24.03 | |

=== 400 metres ===
Heats – 15 August

| Rank | Heat | Name | Nationality | Time | Notes |
|---|---|---|---|---|---|
| 1 | 1 | Sandie Richards | Jamaica | 52.03 | Q |
| 2 | 1 | Norfalia Carabalí | Colombia | 52.36 | Q |
| 3 | 1 | Julia Duporty | Cuba | 52.79 | Q |
| 4 | 2 | Ana Guevara | Mexico | 52.94 | Q |
| 5 | 1 | Melissa Straker | Barbados | 53.05 | q |
| 6 | 2 | Tracey Ann Barnes | Jamaica | 53.16 | Q |
| 7 | 1 | Mayra González | Mexico | 53.18 | q |
| 8 | 2 | Beverly Pierre | Trinidad and Tobago | 53.94 | Q |
| 9 | 2 | Idalmis Bonne | Cuba | 54.10 | |
| 10 | 2 | Tonique Williams | Bahamas | 56.05 | |
| 11 | 2 | Gale Francis | Saint Kitts and Nevis | 56.68 | |
| 12 | 2 | Joanne Durant | Barbados | 56.68 | |
| 13 | 1 | Helen Delgado | Venezuela | 58.20 | |
| 14 | 1 | Arely Franco | El Salvador | 58.53 | |
| 15 | 2 | Yinesca Reyes | Venezuela | 59.10 | |

Final – 16 August

| Rank | Lane | Name | Nationality | Time | Notes |
|---|---|---|---|---|---|
| 1st place, gold medalist(s) | 4 | Sandie Richards | Jamaica | 51.27 | |
| 2nd place, silver medalist(s) | 5 | Ana Guevara | Mexico | 51.32 | |
| 3rd place, bronze medalist(s) | 3 | Norfalia Carabalí | Colombia | 51.52 | |
| 4 | 6 | Tracey Ann Barnes | Jamaica | 51.58 | |
| 5 | 2 | Julia Duporty | Cuba | 52.51 | |
| 6 | 7 | Melissa Straker | Barbados | 52.81 | |
| 7 | 1 | Mayra González | Mexico | 55.53 | |
| | 8 | Beverly Pierre | Trinidad and Tobago | DNS | |

=== 800 metres ===
Heats – 17 August

| Rank | Heat | Name | Nationality | Time | Notes |
|---|---|---|---|---|---|
| 1 | 2 | Ana Fidelia Quirot | Cuba | 2:06.69 | Q |
| 2 | 2 | Ana Guevara | Mexico | 2:07.82 | Q |
| 3 | 1 | Letitia Vriesde | Suriname | 2:08.02 | Q |
| 4 | 2 | Charmaine Howell | Jamaica | 2:08.06 | Q |
| 5 | 1 | Mardrea Hyman | Jamaica | 2:08.80 | Q |
| 6 | 2 | Janeth Lucumí | Colombia | 2:09.47 | q |
| 7 | 2 | Rosa Evora | El Salvador | 2:09.95 | q |
| 8 | 1 | Mayrelin Fuentes | Cuba | 2:10.06 | Q |
| 9 | 1 | Dawn Williams-Sewer | Dominica | 2:12.53 | |
| 10 | 2 | Mery Figueroa | Venezuela | 2:12.90 | |
| 11 | 2 | Zolveik Ruiz | Panama | 2:14.46 | |
| 12 | 1 | Marian Burnett | Guyana | 2:14.58 | |
| 13 | 1 | Isabel Silva | Venezuela | 2:16.48 | |

Final – 19 August

| Rank | Name | Nationality | Time | Notes |
|---|---|---|---|---|
| 1st place, gold medalist(s) | Letitia Vriesde | Suriname | 2:00.24 | |
| 2nd place, silver medalist(s) | Ana Guevara | Mexico | 2:01.12 | NR |
| 3rd place, bronze medalist(s) | Mardrea Hyman | Jamaica | 2:01.46 | |
| 4 | Ana Fidelia Quirot | Cuba | 2:02.46 | |
| 5 | Janeth Lucumí | Colombia | 2:08.11 | |
| 6 | Charmaine Howell | Jamaica | 2:09.69 | |
| 7 | Rosa Evora | El Salvador | 2:13.70 | |
| | Mayrelin Fuentes | Cuba | DNF | |

=== 1500 metres ===
20 August

| Rank | Name | Nationality | Time | Notes |
|---|---|---|---|---|
| 1st place, gold medalist(s) | Mardrea Hyman | Jamaica | 4:27.03 | |
| 2nd place, silver medalist(s) | Nora Rocha | Mexico | 4:27.74 | |
| 3rd place, bronze medalist(s) | Yanelis Lara | Cuba | 4:29.43 | |
| 4 | Bertha Sánchez | Colombia | 4:30.09 | |
| 5 | Elizabeth Zaragoza | El Salvador | 4:42.01 | |
| 6 | Marian Burnett | Guyana | 4:44.71 | |
| 7 | Stacey Quashie | Antigua and Barbuda | 4:49.43 | |
| 8 | Anisha Humes | Trinidad and Tobago | 4:50.91 | |
| | Janil Williams | Antigua and Barbuda | DNF | |
| | Letitia Vriesde | Suriname | DNS | |
| | Ana Fidelia Quirot | Cuba | DNS | |
| | Elsa Monterroso | Guatemala | DNS | |

=== 5000 metres ===
19 August

| Rank | Name | Nationality | Time | Notes |
|---|---|---|---|---|
| 1st place, gold medalist(s) | Nora Rocha | Mexico | 16:43.48 | GR |
| 2nd place, silver medalist(s) | Adriana Fernández | Mexico | 16:44.60 | |
| 3rd place, bronze medalist(s) | Bertha Sánchez | Colombia | 16:51.89 | |
| 4 | Yailén García | Cuba | 16:58.73 | |
| 5 | Janil Williams | Antigua and Barbuda | 17:35.12 | |
| 6 | Elizabeth Zaragoza | El Salvador | 17:37.91 | |
| 7 | Elsa Monterroso | Guatemala | 17:48.27 | |
| 8 | María Stella Castro | Colombia | 17:48.99 | |
| 9 | María Klody Hidalgo | El Salvador | 18:06.78 | |
| 10 | Lisa Hamilton | United States Virgin Islands | 19:38.59 | |
| | Norelis Lugo | Venezuela | DNS | |
| | Gertrudis Carvajal | Venezuela | DNS | |

=== 10,000 metres ===
16 August

| Rank | Name | Nationality | Time | Notes |
|---|---|---|---|---|
| 1st place, gold medalist(s) | Adriana Fernández | Mexico | 34:04.16 | GR |
| 2nd place, silver medalist(s) | Lucía Mendiola | Mexico | 35:27.63 | |
| 3rd place, bronze medalist(s) | Yailén García | Cuba | 36:12.72 | |
| 4 | Gertrudis Carvajal | Venezuela | 36:58.13 | |
| 5 | Norelis Lugo | Venezuela | 37:46.17 | |
| 6 | María Klody Hidalgo | El Salvador | 38:00.06 | |
| | María Stella Castro | Colombia | DNF | |

=== Marathon ===
22 August

| Rank | Name | Nationality | Time | Notes |
|---|---|---|---|---|
| 1st place, gold medalist(s) | Emma Cabrera | Mexico | 2:57:49 | |
| 2nd place, silver medalist(s) | Marisol Vargas | Mexico | 2:58:34 | |
| 3rd place, bronze medalist(s) | Kriscia García | El Salvador | 3:00:21 | |
| 4 | Rosa Rivera | Colombia | 3:09:50 | |
| 5 | Martha Montes | El Salvador | 3:11:11 | |
| 6 | Migdalia Torres | Puerto Rico | 3:13:36 | |
| | Maribel Durruthy | Cuba | DNF | |
| | Maribel Burgos | Puerto Rico | DNF | |

=== 100 metres hurdles ===
16 August
Wind: +2.0 m/s

| Rank | Lane | Name | Nationality | Time | Notes |
|---|---|---|---|---|---|
| 1st place, gold medalist(s) | 5 | Dionne Rose | Jamaica | 12.64 | GR |
| 2nd place, silver medalist(s) | 4 | Gillian Russell | Jamaica | 12.66 | |
| 3rd place, bronze medalist(s) | 7 | Dainelky Pérez | Cuba | 13.23 | |
| 4 | 3 | Yaumara Neyra | Cuba | 13.24 | |
| 5 | 2 | Alejandra Quiñónez | Colombia | 13.68 | |
| 6 | 6 | Jacqueline Tavarez | Mexico | 13.82 | |
| 7 | 1 | Xiomara Dávila | Puerto Rico | 13.87 | |
| 8 | 8 | Juana Mejía | Dominican Republic | 14.46 | |

=== 400 metres hurdles ===
19 August

| Rank | Lane | Name | Nationality | Time | Notes |
|---|---|---|---|---|---|
| 1st place, gold medalist(s) | 5 | Deon Hemmings | Jamaica | 54.30 | |
| 2nd place, silver medalist(s) | 4 | Andrea Blackett | Barbados | 54.61 | |
| 3rd place, bronze medalist(s) | 3 | Debbie-Ann Parris | Jamaica | 55.15 | |
| 4 | 2 | Lency Montelier | Cuba | 57.16 | |
| 5 | 6 | Flor Robledo | Colombia | 58.45 | |
| 6 | 8 | Xiomara Dávila | Puerto Rico | 1:00.84 | |
| 7 | 7 | Veronica Quijano | El Salvador | 1:01.93 | |
| 8 | 1 | Helen Delgado | Venezuela | 1:04.61 | |

=== 4 × 100 metres relay ===
19 August

| Rank | Lane | Team | Name | Time | Notes |
|---|---|---|---|---|---|
| 1st place, gold medalist(s) | 4 | Cuba | Idalia Hechavarría, Dainelky Pérez, Mercedes Carnesolta, Virgen Benavides | 43.89 | |
| 2nd place, silver medalist(s) | 7 | Colombia | Norfalia Carabalí, Felipa Palacios, Patricia Rodríguez, Mirtha Brock | 44.39 | |
| 3rd place, bronze medalist(s) | 6 | Jamaica | Tulia Robinson, Tanya Lawrence, Donette Brown, Brigitte Foster | 44.89 | |
| 4 | 3 | Venezuela | Yaudelis Barbosa, Emmy Ochoa, Macarly Macgregor, Fanny Sevilla | 46.21 | |
| | 5 | Bahamas | Jackie Edwards, Chandra Sturrup, Eldece Clarke, Tonique Williams | DQ | |

=== 4 × 400 metres relay ===
20 August

| Rank | Lane | Team | Name | Time | Notes |
|---|---|---|---|---|---|
| 1st place, gold medalist(s) | 3 | Cuba | Yudalis Díaz, Lency Montelier, Idalmis Bonne, Julia Duporty | 3:29.65 | |
| 2nd place, silver medalist(s) | 2 | Jamaica | Charmaine Howel, Keisha Downer, Debbie-Ann Parris, Tracey Barnes | 3:30.03 | |
| 3rd place, bronze medalist(s) | 5 | Barbados | Joanne Durant, Andrea Blackett, Sherline Williams, Melissa Straker | 3:31.91 | |
| 4 | 4 | Mexico | María Pantoja, Marcela Sarabia, Mayra González, Ana Guevara | 3:34.37 | |
| 5 | 7 | Venezuela | Tatiana Volcan, Mery Figueroa, Isabel Silva, Helen Delgado | 3:48.00 | |
| 6 | 6 | El Salvador | Arely Franco, Veronica Quijano, Ana Quezada, Rosa Evora | 3:48.27 | |
| | 8 | Colombia | | DNS | |

=== 10,000 metres walk ===
16 August

| Rank | Name | Nationality | Time | Notes |
|---|---|---|---|---|
| 1st place, gold medalist(s) | Graciela Mendoza | Mexico | 46:30.16 | GR |
| 2nd place, silver medalist(s) | Rosario Sánchez | Mexico | 47:12.74 | |
| 3rd place, bronze medalist(s) | Oslaidis Cruz | Cuba | 47:14.85 | |
| 4 | Natividad Collado | Guatemala | 48:09.67 | |
| 5 | Ivis Martínez | El Salvador | 48:25.78 | |
| 6 | Sandra Zapata | Colombia | 48:42.75 | |
| 7 | Mayra Sosa | Venezuela | 53:17.55 | |
| 8 | Morelba Useche | Venezuela | 54:45.79 | |

=== High jump ===
16 August

| Rank | Name | Nationality | 1.55 | 1.60 | 1.65 | 1.70 | 1.73 | 1.76 | 1.79 | 1.82 | 1.85 | 1.88 | 1.90 | 1.93 | Result | Notes |
|---|---|---|---|---|---|---|---|---|---|---|---|---|---|---|---|---|
| 1st place, gold medalist(s) | Juana Arrendel | Dominican Republic | – | – | – | o | – | o | o | o | o | xo | o | xxx | 1.90 | |
| 2nd place, silver medalist(s) | Natasha Gibson | Trinidad and Tobago | – | – | – | o | – | o | – | xxo | x– | xx | | | 1.82 | |
| 3rd place, bronze medalist(s) | Niurka Lussón | Cuba | – | – | – | o | – | xxo | xo | xxx | | | | | 1.79 | |
| 4 | Romary Rifka | Mexico | – | – | – | o | – | o | xxx | | | | | | 1.76 | |
| 5 | Karen Beautle | Jamaica | o | o | o | o | xxo | xo | xxx | | | | | | 1.76 | |
| 6 | Cristina Fink | Mexico | – | – | o | xxx | | | | | | | | | 1.65 | |
| 7 | Lisa Wright | Jamaica | o | o | r | | | | | | | | | | 1.60 | |
| 8 | Gladibeth Morles | Venezuela | – | xo | xxx | | | | | | | | | | 1.60 | |

=== Pole vault ===
19 August

| Rank | Name | Nationality | Result | Notes |
|---|---|---|---|---|
| 1st place, gold medalist(s) | Alejandra Meza | Mexico | 3.70 | |
| 2nd place, silver medalist(s) | Mariana McCarthy | Cuba | 3.50 | |
| 3rd place, bronze medalist(s) | Denise Jerez | Guatemala | 2.00 | |
| | Lorena Espinosa | Mexico | NM | |
| | Yosible Fuentes | Venezuela | NM | |
| | Zorobabelia Córdoba | Colombia | DNS | |

=== Long jump ===
15 August

| Rank | Name | Nationality | #1 | #2 | #3 | #4 | #5 | #6 | Result | Notes |
|---|---|---|---|---|---|---|---|---|---|---|
| 1st place, gold medalist(s) | Flora Hyacinth | United States Virgin Islands | 6.26 | 6.57 | 6.26 | x | 6.30 | x | 6.57 | |
| 2nd place, silver medalist(s) | Jackie Edwards | Bahamas | x | 6.19 | 6.50 | x | x | x | 6.50 | |
| 3rd place, bronze medalist(s) | Lacena Golding | Jamaica | x | x | 5.81 | 6.42 | x | 6.49 | 6.49 | |
| 4 | Elisa Pérez | Dominican Republic | 6.09 | 5.85 | x | x | 6.17 | x | 6.17 | |
| 5 | Colleen Gillies | Jamaica | 5.68 | 5.78 | 5.87 | x | 5.79 | x | 5.87 | |
| 6 | Betsabee Berrios | Puerto Rico | x | 5.74 | 5.79 | x | 5.55 | 5.70 | 5.79 | |
| 7 | Cherita Howard | Barbados | x | x | 5.61 | x | x | 5.61 | 5.61 | |
| 8 | Nathaniel Gómez | Venezuela | 5.50 | 5.47 | x | x | 5.54 | 5.61 | 5.61 | |
| 9 | Ana Patricia Traña | Nicaragua | 5.05 | 5.00 | 4.88 | | | | 5.05 | |

=== Triple jump ===
20 August

| Rank | Name | Nationality | #1 | #2 | #3 | #4 | #5 | #6 | Result | Notes |
|---|---|---|---|---|---|---|---|---|---|---|
| 1st place, gold medalist(s) | Yamilé Aldama | Cuba | 14.34 | 14.32 | x | x | x | 13.97 | 14.34 | GR |
| 2nd place, silver medalist(s) | Suzette Lee | Jamaica | 13.54 | 13.36 | x | 13.34 | 13.77 | x | 13.77 | |
| 3rd place, bronze medalist(s) | Olga Cepero | Cuba | 13.72 | 13.59 | x | 13.56 | x | 13.74 | 13.74 | |
| 4 | Natasha Gibson | Trinidad and Tobago | 13.53 | 13.42 | 13.00 | x | 13.28 | 12.77 | 13.53 | |
| 5 | Colleen Gillies | Jamaica | x | 13.25 | 13.13 | 13.13 | 13.17 | x | 13.25 | |
| 6 | Ludmila Reyes | Venezuela | 13.17 | 12.85 | x | 12.70 | x | x | 13.17 | |
| 7 | Cherita Howard | Barbados | 12.68 | x | 12.78 | x | 12.38 | 12.55 | 12.78 | |
| 8 | Sorileny Quintero | Venezuela | x | 12.70 | 12.62 | 12.33 | x | x | 12.70 | |
| 9 | Ana Patricia Traña | Nicaragua | x | 11.86 | 11.95 | | | | 11.95 | |

=== Shot put ===
16 August

| Rank | Name | Nationality | #1 | #2 | #3 | #4 | #5 | #6 | Result | Notes |
|---|---|---|---|---|---|---|---|---|---|---|
| 1st place, gold medalist(s) | Yumileidi Cumbá | Cuba | x | 18.08 | x | x | 18.89 | 18.60 | 18.89 | |
| ~~2~~ | Herminia Fernández | Cuba | | | | | | | ~~17.31~~ | DQ, doping |
| 2nd place, silver medalist(s) | María Isabel Urrutia | Colombia | 14.02 | 13.44 | 14.25 | 14.10 | x | 14.09 | 14.25 | |
| 3rd place, bronze medalist(s) | Mari Mercedes | Dominican Republic | 13.41 | 13.80 | 13.96 | 13.67 | 13.99 | 12.86 | 13.99 | |
| 4 | Fanny García | Venezuela | 13.46 | 13.71 | x | x | x | 13.67 | 13.71 | |
| 5 | Zolanda Orozco | Venezuela | 13.30 | 13.14 | x | x | 13.61 | x | 13.61 | |
| 6 | Doris Thompson | Bahamas | 10.87 | 12.17 | 13.36 | 13.59 | 12.63 | 13.08 | 13.59 | |
| 7 | Natalia Brown | Jamaica | 11.69 | 12.58 | 11.92 | 12.51 | 12.41 | x | 12.58 | |
| 8 | Trisher Thompson | Guyana | 12.09 | 12.37 | x | | | | 12.37 | |

=== Discus throw ===
20 August

| Rank | Name | Nationality | #1 | #2 | #3 | #4 | #5 | #6 | Result | Notes |
|---|---|---|---|---|---|---|---|---|---|---|
| 1st place, gold medalist(s) | Bárbara Hechevarría | Cuba | 54.11 | 57.83 | 56.27 | x | 58.14 | 56.11 | 58.14 | |
| 2nd place, silver medalist(s) | Hilda Ramos | Cuba | 54.35 | 53.93 | 55.42 | 54.49 | x | x | 55.42 | |
| 3rd place, bronze medalist(s) | María Isabel Urrutia | Colombia | 46.19 | x | 45.53 | 50.44 | x | 48.04 | 50.44 | |
| 4 | Grettel Miller | Jamaica | 46.44 | x | 41.90 | 43.09 | x | 46.31 | 46.44 | |
| 5 | Neolanis Suárez | Venezuela | 42.67 | 43.71 | 42.14 | 46.44 | x | x | 46.44 | |
| 6 | Fanny García | Venezuela | 42.71 | 43.90 | x | x | x | 42.35 | 43.90 | |
| 7 | Natalia Brown | Jamaica | 41.71 | 41.17 | 43.13 | 39.77 | 43.74 | 39.13 | 43.74 | |
| 8 | María Lourdes Ruiz | Nicaragua | 35.36 | 36.54 | 38.43 | 39.27 | x | 37.69 | 39.27 | |

=== Hammer throw ===
15 August

| Rank | Name | Nationality | #1 | #2 | #3 | #4 | #5 | #6 | Result | Notes |
|---|---|---|---|---|---|---|---|---|---|---|
| 1st place, gold medalist(s) | Aldenay Vasallo | Cuba | x | 57.57 | 58.30 | x | 61.46 | x | 61.46 | GR |
| 2nd place, silver medalist(s) | María Eugenia Villamizar | Colombia | 55.76 | 52.91 | 52.59 | 57.08 | 57.42 | 57.69 | 57.69 | |
| 3rd place, bronze medalist(s) | Norbi Balantén | Cuba | x | 56.06 | x | x | x | 57.30 | 57.30 | |
| 4 | Violeta Guzmán | Mexico | x | 54.76 | 56.09 | 54.06 | x | x | 56.09 | |
| 5 | Claudia Becerril | Mexico | 53.30 | 55.50 | 52.17 | x | 52.53 | 55.86 | 55.86 | |
| 6 | Grettel Miller | Jamaica | 53.04 | x | 54.48 | 55.16 | 55.46 | 54.20 | 55.46 | |
| 7 | Nancy Guillén | El Salvador | x | 51.82 | x | 51.61 | 54.69 | 53.44 | 54.69 | |
| 8 | Candida Ascencio | Dominican Republic | 44.62 | x | x | x | 45.64 | 44.21 | 45.64 | |
| 9 | Nahomy Pérez | Puerto Rico | x | x | 44.13 | | | | 44.13 | |

=== Javelin throw ===
17 August

| Rank | Name | Nationality | #1 | #2 | #3 | #4 | #5 | #6 | Result | Notes |
|---|---|---|---|---|---|---|---|---|---|---|
| 1st place, gold medalist(s) | Sonia Bisset | Cuba | 63.35 | 62.91 | 66.67 | x | x | 59.51 | 66.67 | |
| 2nd place, silver medalist(s) | Osleidys Menéndez | Cuba | 62.06 | 61.62 | 60.36 | x | x | 61.44 | 62.06 | |
| 3rd place, bronze medalist(s) | Laverne Eve | Bahamas | 60.66 | x | 59.54 | 57.01 | 58.83 | x | 60.66 | |
| 4 | Sabina Moya | Colombia | 53.70 | 60.10 | 54.56 | x | 50.38 | 59.25 | 60.10 | |
| 5 | Maricela Robles | Dominican Republic | 49.43 | x | x | – | 44.62 | – | 49.43 | |
| 6 | Geraldine George | Trinidad and Tobago | 44.24 | 43.40 | 45.80 | 45.59 | 44.19 | 46.55 | 46.55 | |
| 7 | Trishel Thompson | Guyana | 41.67 | 40.09 | x | x | 39.72 | 42.78 | 42.78 | |
| | Zuleima Araméndiz | Colombia | x | x | r | | | | NM | |

=== Heptathlon ===
20–21 August

The highest mark recorded in each event is highlighted in yellow

| Rank | Name | Nationality | 100m H | HJ | SP | 200m | LJ | JT | 800m | Points | Notes |
|---|---|---|---|---|---|---|---|---|---|---|---|
| 1st place, gold medalist(s) | Magalys García | Cuba | 14.02 | 1.70 | 14.11 | 24.51w | 5.62 | 50.20 | 2:27.48 | 5888 | |
| 2nd place, silver medalist(s) | Marsha Mark | Trinidad and Tobago | 14.24 | 1.64 | 11.26 | 25.32w | 6.21 | 47.52 | 2:23.18 | 5706 | |
| 3rd place, bronze medalist(s) | Lisa Wright | Jamaica | 14.67 | 1.76 | 9.69 | 25.24w | 5.88 | 46.40 | 2:23.65 | 5566 | |
| 4 | Osiris Pedroso | Cuba | 14.77 | 1.73 | 11.50 | 25.30w | 5.59 | 34.45 | 2:26.22 | 5278 | |
| 5 | Sherly Acosta | Puerto Rico | 14.49 | 1.52 | 11.29 | 25.81w | 5.51 | 33.42 | 2:25.68 | 4975 | |
| 6 | Gladibert Morles | Venezuela | 15.02 | 1.67 | 10.07 | 26.69w | 5.75 | 29.76 | 2:23.71 | 4949 | |
| 7 | Zorobabelia Cordova | Colombia | 14.65 | 1.58 | 13.70 | 25.34w | 5.45 | 50.24 | DNF | 4781 | |
| 8 | Rubia Quintanillo | Venezuela | 15.86 | 1.58 | 11.54 | 27.60w | 5.01 | 41.60 | 2:33.20 | 4651 | |
| 9 | Josefina José | Dominican Republic | 15.39 | 1.4 | 11.65 | 26.10w | 5.10 | 37.97 | 2:31.00 | 4624 | |
