= Athletics at the 1999 Pan American Games – Men's 4 × 400 metres relay =

Men's 4 × 400 metres relay at the Pan American Games

The men's 4 × 400 metres relay event at the 1999 Pan American Games was held July 28–30.

== Medalists ==
Gold	Silver	Bronze
Jamaica; Michael McDonald; Greg Haughton; Danny McFarlane; Davian Clarke; Paston Coke*	Brazil; Eronilde de Araújo; Claudinei da Silva; Anderson Jorge dos Santos; Sanderlei Parrela; Cleverson da Silva*	United States; Danny McCray; Deon Minor; Torrance Zellner; Alvin Harrison

* Athletes who competed in heats only

== Results ==
=== Heats ===
Qualification: First 3 teams of each heat (Q) plus the next 2 fastest (q) qualified for the final.

Rank	Heat	Nation	Athletes	Time	Notes
1	2	Jamaica	Paston Coke, Michael McDonald, Danny McFarlane, Davian Clarke	3:00.05	Q
2	1	Bahamas	Timothy Munnings, Chris Brown, Avard Moncur, Carl Oliver	3:00.73	Q, SB
3	1	United States	Deon Minor, Alvin Harrison, Danny McCray, Torrance Zellner	3:00.73	Q
4	2	Brazil	Eronilde de Araújo, Sanderlei Parrela, Cleverson da Silva, Anderson Jorge dos Santos	3:01.04	Q
5	1	Cuba	Mariano Mesa, Omar Mena, Edel Hevia, Jorge Crusellas	3:02.04	Q
6	2	Canada	Shane Niemi, Monte Raymond, Byron Goodwin, Don Bruno	3:04.69	Q
7	2	Dominican Republic	Carlos Santa, Félix Sánchez, José Peralta, Francisco Cornelio	3:06.72	q
8	1	Trinidad and Tobago	Neil De Silva, Alvin Daniel, Nicconnor Alexander, Peter Frederick	3:08.28	q
9	2	Antigua and Barbuda	N’Kosie Barnes, Kenmore Hughes, Piet Jeffrey, Bernard Daley	3:10.80	
10	1	Saint Vincent and the Grenadines	Joel Mascoll, Desmond Robinson, Fitz-Allen Crick, Thomas Dickson	3:10.81	

=== Final ===
Rank	Nation	Athletes	Time	Notes
1st place, gold medalist(s)	Jamaica	Michael McDonald, Greg Haughton, Danny McFarlane, Davian Clarke	2:57.97	WL, GR
2nd place, silver medalist(s)	Brazil	Sanderlei Parrela, Claudinei da Silva, Anderson Jorge dos Santos, Eronilde de Araújo	2:58.56	NR
3rd place, bronze medalist(s)	United States	Danny McCray, Deon Minor, Torrance Zellner, Alvin Harrison	3:00.94	
4	Cuba	Norberto Téllez, Mariano Mesa, Jorge Crusellas, Edel Hevia	3:01.79	SB
5	Canada	Monte Raymond, Shane Niemi, Don Bruno, Byron Goodwin	3:03.06	
6	Dominican Republic	Francisco Cornelio, Félix Sánchez, Carlos Santa, José Peralta	3:05.19	
	Bahamas	Chris Brown, Timothy Munnings, Avard Moncur, Dennis Darling	DNF	
	Trinidad and Tobago		DNS	
