= Athletics at the 1998 Central American and Caribbean Games =

Athletics at the XVIII CAC Games
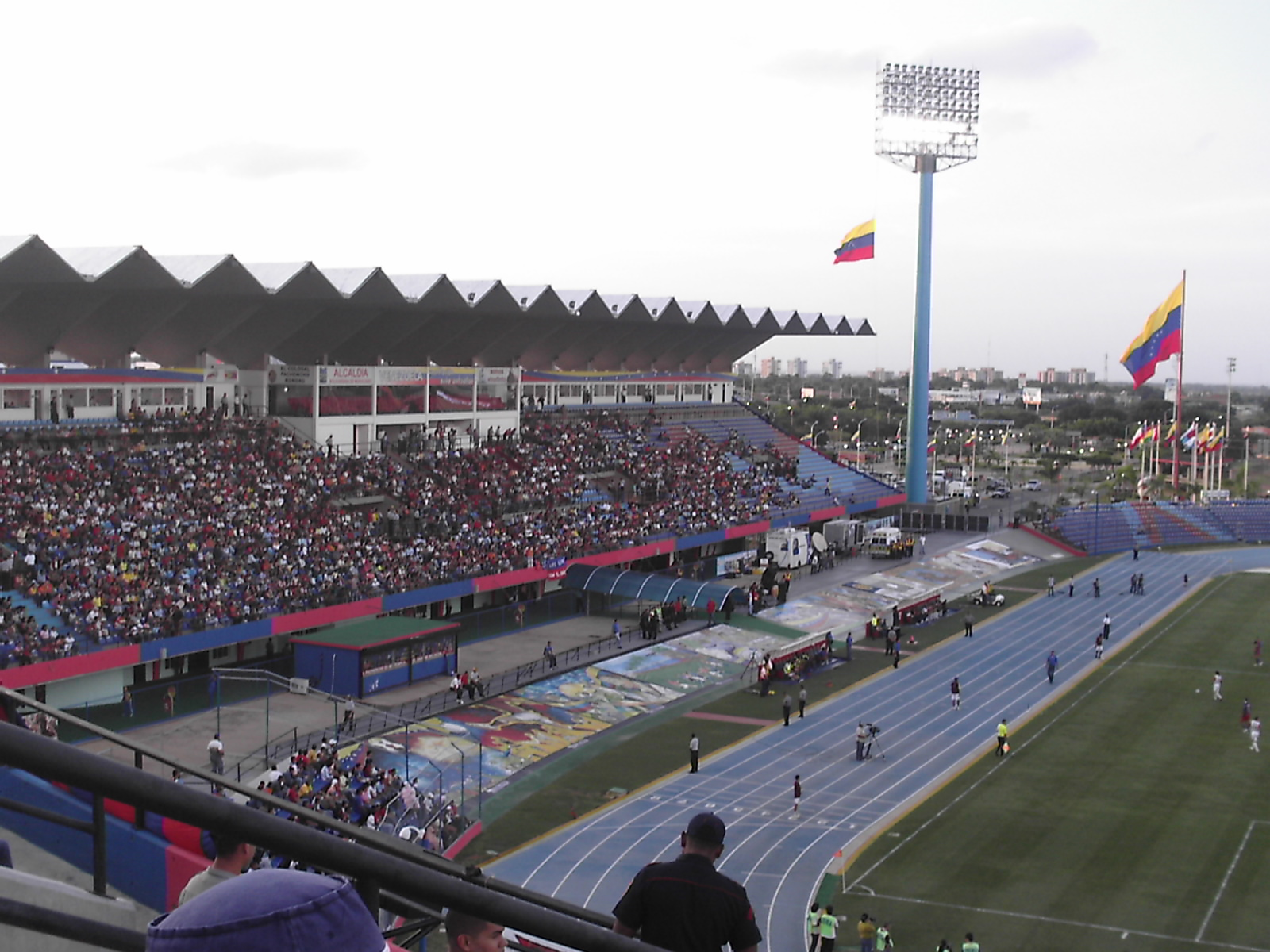
- Host stadium (shown in 2007)
- Dates: 15–22 August 1998
- Host city: Maracaibo, Venezuela
- Venue: Estadio José Pachencho Romero
- Events: 43
- Participation: 436 athletes from 31 nations

The track and field competition in the 1998 Central American and Caribbean Games was held in Maracaibo, Venezuela. It was the first edition to feature women's hammer throw and pole vault.

== Medal summary ==
=== Men's events ===
Event	Gold		Silver		Bronze	
100 metres	Obadele Thompson; Barbados	10.20	Dwight Ferguson; Bahamas	10.43	Luis Pérez; Cuba	10.44
200 metres	Juan Pedro Toledo; Mexico	20.46	Misael Ortíz; Cuba	20.75	Iván García; Cuba	20.81
400 metres	Troy McIntosh; Bahamas	44.84	Roxbert Martin; Jamaica	45.11	Alejandro Cárdenas; Mexico	45.22
800 metres	Norberto Téllez; Cuba	1:49.71	Ereisis Torres; Cuba	1:51.39	Mark Olivo; Venezuela	1:51.68
1500 metres	Héctor Torres; Mexico	3:46.06	Emigdio Delgado; Venezuela	3:47.71	Pablo Olmedo; Mexico	3:48.19
5000 metres	Pablo Olmedo; Mexico	14:01.85	Freddy González; Venezuela	14:04.77	Germán Beltrán; Venezuela	14:05.15
10,000 metres	Germán Beltrán; Venezuela	29:49.06	Julio César Valle; Mexico	29:53.40	Gabino Apolonio; Mexico	30:11.29
Marathon	Juan Camacho; Mexico	2:25:25	William Ramírez; Colombia	2:25:33	Rubén Maza; Venezuela	2:27:46
110 metres hurdles	Anier García; Cuba	13.27	Steve Brown; Trinidad and Tobago	13.56	Erik Batte; Cuba	13.84
400 metres hurdles	Dinsdale Morgan; Jamaica	48.87	Emilio Valle; Cuba	49.66	Kemel Thompson; Jamaica	49.67
3000 metre steeplechase	Salvador Miranda; Mexico	8:41.70	Néstor Nieves; Venezuela	8:43.34	Daniel Torres; Mexico	8:46.44
4 × 100 metres relay	Cuba; Alfredo García; Misael Ortiz; Iván García; Luis Pérez	38.79	Jamaica; Garth Robinson; Patrick Jarrett; Leon Gordon; Clarkson Reid	39.04	Trinidad and Tobago; Niconnor Alexander; Steve Brown; Peter Fredericks; Julian Raeburn	39.54
4 × 400 metres relay	Cuba; Omar Mena; Jorge Crusellas; Edel Hevia; Norberto Téllez	3:03.18	Jamaica; Michael McDonald; Greg Haughton; Gregory Hines; Davian Clarke	3:03.26	Bahamas; Avard Moncur; Carl Oliver; Chris Brown; Dennis Darling	3:04.16
20 kilometre road walk	Daniel García; Mexico	1:23:32	Bernardo Segura; Mexico	1:24:31	Julio Martínez; Guatemala	1:25:31
50 kilometre road walk	Ignacio Zamudio; Mexico	3:58:15	Hugo López; Guatemala	4:06:55	Jorge Luis Pino; Cuba	4:07:52
High jump	Javier Sotomayor; Cuba	2.37	Gilmar Mayo; Colombia	2.30	Julio Luciano; Dominican Republic	2.21
Pole vault	Edgar Díaz; Puerto Rico	5.30	Ricardo Diez; Venezuela	5.30	Jorge Tienda; Mexico	5.10
Long jump	Iván Pedroso; Cuba	8.45	James Beckford; Jamaica	8.16	Joan Lino Martínez; Cuba	8.09
Triple jump	Yoelbi Quesada; Cuba	17.18	Aliecer Urrutia; Cuba	16.53	Iván Salcedo; Mexico	16.10
Shot put	Yojer Medina; Venezuela	19.42	Yosvany Obregón; Cuba	18.30	Orlando Ibarra; Colombia	17.52
Discus throw	Alexis Elizalde; Cuba	65.00	Frank Casañas; Cuba	59.38	Alfredo Romero; Puerto Rico	50.83
Hammer throw	Alberto Sánchez; Cuba	74.25	Yosvany Suárez; Cuba	69.35	Guillermo Guzmán; Mexico	63.78
Javelin throw	Emeterio González; Cuba	80.92	Isbel Luaces; Cuba	78.96	Edwin Cuesta; Venezuela	75.41
Decathlon	Raúl Duany; Cuba	8118	Eugenio Balanqué; Cuba	8090	Diógenes Estévez; Venezuela	7237

=== Women's events ===
Event	Gold		Silver		Bronze	
100 metres	Chandra Sturrup; Bahamas	11.14	Beverly McDonald; Jamaica	11.36	Tayna Lawrence; Jamaica	11.53
200 metres	Beverly McDonald; Jamaica	22.30w	Juliet Campbell; Jamaica	22.63w	Felipa Palacios; Colombia	23.07w
400 metres	Sandie Richards; Jamaica	51.27	Ana Guevara; Mexico	51.32	Norfalia Carabalí; Colombia	51.52
800 metres	Letitia Vriesde; Suriname	2:00.24	Ana Guevara; Mexico	2:01.12 (NR)	Mardrea Hyman; Jamaica	2:01.46
1500 metres	Mardrea Hyman; Jamaica	4:27.03	Nora Rocha; Mexico	4:27.74	Yanelis Lara; Cuba	4:29.43
5000 metres	Nora Rocha; Mexico	16:43.48	Adriana Fernández; Mexico	16:44.60	Bertha Sánchez; Colombia	16:51.89
10,000 metres	Adriana Fernández; Mexico	34:04.16	Lucía Mendiola; Mexico	35:27.63	Yailén García; Cuba	36:12.72
Marathon	Emma Cabrera; Mexico	2:57:49	Marisol Vargas; Mexico	2:58:34	Kriscia García; El Salvador	3:00:21
100 metres hurdles	Dionne Rose; Jamaica	12.64	Gillian Russell; Jamaica	12.66	Dainelky Pérez; Cuba	13.23
400 metres hurdles	Deon Hemmings; Jamaica	54.30	Andrea Blackett; Barbados	54.61	Debbie-Ann Parris; Jamaica	55.15
4 × 100 metres relay	Cuba; Idalia Hechavarría; Dainelky Pérez; Mercedes Carnesolta; Virgen Benavides	43.89	Colombia; Norfalia Carabalí; Felipa Palacios; Patricia Rodríguez; Mirtha Brock	44.39	Jamaica; Tulia Robinson; Tanya Lawrence; Donette Brown; Brigitte Foster	44.89
4 × 400 metres relay	Cuba; Yudalis Díaz; Lency Montelier; Idalmis Bonne; Julia Duporty	3:29.65	Jamaica; Charmaine Howel; Keisha Downer; Debbie-Ann Parris; Tracey Barnes	3:30.03	Barbados; Joanne Durant; Andrea Blackett; Sherline Williams; Melissa Straker	3:31.91
10,000 metre track walk	Graciela Mendoza; Mexico	46:30.16	Rosario Sánchez; Mexico	47:12.74	Oslaidis Cruz; Cuba	47:14.85
High jump	Juana Arrendel; Dominican Republic	1.90	Natasha Gibson; Trinidad and Tobago	1.82	Niurka Lussón; Cuba	1.79
Pole vault	Alejandra Meza; Mexico	3.70	Mariana McCarthy; Cuba	3.50	Agueda Jerez; Guatemala	2.90
Long jump	Flora Hyacinth; U.S. Virgin Islands	6.57	Jackie Edwards; Bahamas	6.50	Lacena Golding; Jamaica	6.49
Triple jump	Yamilé Aldama; Cuba	14.34	Suzette Lee; Jamaica	13.77	Olga Cepero; Cuba	13.74
Shot put	Yumileidi Cumbá; Cuba	18.89	María Isabel Urrutia; Colombia	14.25	Mari Mercedes; Dominican Republic	13.99
Discus throw	Bárbara Hechevarría; Cuba	58.14	Hilda Ramos; Cuba	55.42	María Isabel Urrutia; Colombia	50.44
Hammer throw	Aldenay Vasallo; Cuba	61.46	María Eugenia Villamizar; Colombia	57.69	Norbi Balantén; Cuba	57.30
Javelin throw	Sonia Bisset; Cuba	66.67	Osleidys Menéndez; Cuba	62.06	Laverne Eve; Bahamas	60.66
Heptathlon	Magalys García; Cuba	5888	Marsha Mark; Trinidad and Tobago	5706	Lisa Wright; Jamaica	5566

== Medal table ==
* Host nation (Venezuela)

Rank	Nation	Gold	Silver	Bronze	Total
1	Cuba	19	13	12	44
2	Mexico	12	9	7	28
3	Jamaica	6	9	7	22
4	Venezuela*	2	4	5	11
5	Bahamas	2	2	3	7
6	Barbados	1	1	1	3
7	Dominican Republic	1	0	1	2
7	Puerto Rico	1	0	1	2
9	Suriname	1	0	0	1
9	U.S. Virgin Islands	1	0	0	1
11	Colombia	0	4	6	10
12	Trinidad and Tobago	0	3	0	3
13	Guatemala	0	1	2	3
14	El Salvador	0	0	1	1
Totals (14 entries)		46	46	46	138

== Participation ==
- Antigua and Barbuda (7)
- Aruba (2)
- Bahamas (19)
- Barbados (10)
- Belize (4)
- Bermuda (5)
- British Virgin Islands (4)
- Cayman Islands (6)
- Colombia (28)
- Costa Rica (2)
- Cuba (64)
- Dominica (2)
- Dominican Republic (15)
- Grenada (6)
- Guatemala (15)
- Guyana (3)
- Haiti (4)
- Jamaica (41)
- Mexico (51)
- Netherlands Antilles (5)
- Nicaragua (5)
- Panama (2)
- Puerto Rico (27)
- Saint Kitts and Nevis (12)
- Saint Lucia (4)
- Saint Vincent and the Grenadines (3)
- El Salvador (19)
- Suriname (1)
- Trinidad and Tobago (12)
- United States Virgin Islands (3)
- Venezuela (55)

== See also ==
- 1998 in athletics (track and field)
