= 1999 Central American and Caribbean Championships in Athletics =

- Dates: 25–27 June
- Host city: Bridgetown, Barbados
- Venue: Barbados National Stadium

The 1999 Central American and Caribbean Championships in Athletics were held at the Barbados National Stadium in Bridgetown, Barbados between 25–27 June.

== Medal summary ==
=== Men's events ===
Event	Gold		Silver		Bronze	
100 metres (wind: -1.3 m/s)	Obadele Thompson; Barbados	10.23	Kim Collins; Saint Kitts and Nevis	10.31	Patrick Jarrett; Jamaica	10.41
200 metres (wind: +2.3 m/s)	Christopher Williams; Jamaica	20.40w	Francisco Cornelio; Dominican Republic	20.90w	Dion Crabbe; British Virgin Islands	21.12w
400 metres	Michael McDonald; Jamaica	45.21	Davian Clarke; Jamaica	45.49	Neil de Silva; Trinidad and Tobago	45.61
800 metres	Ian Roberts; Guyana	1:46.85	Mario Watson; Jamaica	1:46.92	Kenroy Levy; Jamaica	1:46.99
1500 metres	Rodolfo Gómez; Mexico	3:46.74	Terrance Armstrong; Bermuda	3:46.77	José López; Venezuela	3:48.65
5000 metres	Fidencio Torres; Mexico	14:20.19	David Galindo; Mexico	14:21.43	Juan Díaz; Venezuela	14:21.79
10,000 metres	Juan Díaz; Venezuela	31:06.88	Pamenos Ballantyne; Saint Vincent and the Grenadines	31:12.57	Benedict Ballantyne; Saint Vincent and the Grenadines	31:59.67
110 metres hurdles (wind: +0.6 m/s)	Steve Brown; Trinidad and Tobago	13.44 CR	Victor Houston; Barbados	13.71	Wagner Marseille; Haiti	13.75
400 metres hurdles	Victor Houston; Barbados	50.23	Paul Tucker; Guyana	51.59	Jeff Jackson; U.S. Virgin Islands	54.70
3000 metres steeplechase	Salvador Miranda; Mexico	8:42.45	Emigdio Delgado; Venezuela	8:44.43	Rubén García; Mexico	8:47.33
4 × 100 metres relay	Barbados; Obadele Thompson; Victor Houston; Gabriel Burnett; Stefan Mascoll	39.75	Saint Kitts and Nevis; Kim Collins; Kurvin Wallace; Alain Maxime Isiah; Kevin Arthurton	40.83	Bahamas; Brian Babbs; Dennis Darling; Renward Wells; Dwight Ferguson	40.92
4 × 400 metres relay	Bahamas; Dennis Darling; Carl Oliver; Tim Munnings; Chris Brown	3:03.76	Jamaica; Davian Clarke; Michael McDonald; Mario Watson; Kenroy Levy	3:03.82	Dominican Republic; Carlos Santa; Charly Reyes; José Gerardo Peralta; Santos Mercado	3:09.08
20 km road walk	Noé Hernández; Mexico	1:20:49 CR	Luis García; Cuba	1:25:51	Mario Iván Flores; Mexico	1:36:26
High jump	Julio Luciano; Dominican Republic	2.23	César Ballesteros; Mexico	2.10	Kevin Cumberbatch; Barbados	2.10
Pole vault	Dominic Johnson; Saint Lucia	5.61 CR	Edgar Díaz; Puerto Rico	5.40	César Nava; Mexico	4.70
Long jump	Craig Hepburn; Barbados	7.75	Luis Quiñones; Puerto Rico	7.60	Emile John; Saint Lucia	7.55
Triple jump	Brian Wellman; Bermuda	17.01	Frank Rutherford; Bahamas	16.87	Allen Mortimer; Bahamas	16.84
Shot put	Dave Stoute; Trinidad and Tobago	16.39	Arturo Francisco; Puerto Rico	16.21	Jaime Comandari; El Salvador	15.99
Discus throw	Kevin Brown; Jamaica	56.02	Alfredo Romero; Puerto Rico	53.00	Juan Neverson; Saint Vincent and the Grenadines	45.20
Javelin throw	Trevor Modeste; Grenada	63.92	Selwyn Smith; Grenada	63.03	Richard Rock; Barbados	61.92

=== Women's events ===
Event	Gold		Silver		Bronze	
100 metres (wind: -1.9 m/s)	Katia Benth; French Guiana	11.47	Heather Samuel; Antigua and Barbuda	11.48	Beverly Grant; Jamaica	11.52
200 metres (wind: -3.6 m/s)	Katia Benth; French Guiana	22.87	Heather Samuel; Antigua and Barbuda	23.64	Adia McKinnon; Trinidad and Tobago	23.92
400 metres	Vernetta Lesforis; Saint Lucia	52.21	Tonique Williams; Bahamas	52.22	Melissa Straker; Barbados	52.58
800 metres	Charmaine Howell; Jamaica	2:03.85	Augustina Charles; Saint Lucia	2:06.30	Shernette Davis; Jamaica	2:07.36
1500 metres	Isabel Juárez; Mexico	4:26.64	Janill Williams; Antigua and Barbuda	4:30.24	Marian Burnett; Guyana	4:35.56
Half marathon	Kriscia García; El Salvador	1:26:25	Burgette Williams; Guyana	2:26:30		only 2 finishers
100 metres hurdles (wind: -1.9 m/s)	Gillian Russell; Jamaica	13.25	Brigitte Foster; Jamaica	13.49	Jacqueline Taváres; Mexico	14.16
400 metres hurdles	Andrea Blackett; Barbados	56.87	Allison Beckford; Jamaica	58.67	Damaris Diana; Puerto Rico	60.92
4 × 100 metres relay	Jamaica; Gillian Russell-Love; Kerry-Ann Richards; Beverly Grant; Bridgette Foster	44.18	Puerto Rico; Militza Castro; Xiomara Davila; Jennifer Caraballo; Yesenia Rivera	45.34	Barbados; Tanya Oxley; Lucy-Ann Richards; Keitha Moseley; Ayesha Maycock	46.78
4 × 400 metres relay	Jamaica; Shernette Davis; Allison Beckford; Beverly Grant; Charmaine Howell	3:30.00	Barbados; Tanya Oxley; Lucy-Ann Richards; Joanne Durant; Melissa Straker	3:32.40	Puerto Rico; Militza Castro; Xiomara Davila; Sandra Moya; Damaris Diana	3:39.75
10 km road walk	Teresa Ramos; Guatemala	47:37 =CR	Elsa Segura; Mexico	50:35	Victoria Palacios; Mexico	57:41
High jump	Karen Beautle; Jamaica	1.79	Romary Rifka; Mexico	1.77	Desiree Crichlow; Barbados	1.77
Pole vault	Alejandra Meza; Mexico	3.75 CR	Lorena Espinoza; Mexico	3.60		
Long jump	Lacena Golding; Jamaica	6.52	Jackie Edwards; Bahamas	6.38	Michelle Baptiste; Saint Lucia	6.26
Triple jump	Anna-Maria Thorpe; Barbados	12.77	Natasha Brown; Bahamas	12.41	María Fleischmann; Guatemala	12.37
Shot put	Doris Thompson; Bahamas	13.23	Isabella Charles; Dominica	12.56	Shirley Acosta; Puerto Rico	9.88
Discus throw	María Cubillán; Venezuela	42.08	Shernelle Nicholls; Barbados	40.98	Doris Thompson; Bahamas	35.20
Hammer throw	Nancy Guillén; El Salvador	57.84 CR	Violeta Guzmán; Mexico	56.72	Claudia Becerril; Mexico	52.93
Javelin throw (Current design)	Laverne Eve; Bahamas	61.61 CR	Olivia McKoy; Jamaica	54.24	Marisela Robles; Dominican Republic	48.00

== Medal table ==
* Host nation (Barbados)

Rank	Nation	Gold	Silver	Bronze	Total
1	Jamaica (JAM)	9	6	4	19
2	Mexico (MEX)	6	6	6	18
3	Barbados (BAR)*	6	3	5	14
4	Bahamas (BAH)	3	4	3	10
5	Saint Lucia (LCA)	2	1	2	5
5	Venezuela (VEN)	2	1	2	5
7	Trinidad and Tobago (TTO)	2	0	2	4
8	El Salvador (ESA)	2	0	1	3
9	French Guiana (GUF)	2	0	0	2
10	Guyana (GUY)	1	2	1	4
11	Dominican Republic (DOM)	1	1	2	4
12	Bermuda (BER)	1	1	0	2
12	Grenada (GRN)	1	1	0	2
14	Guatemala (GUA)	1	0	1	2
15	Puerto Rico (PUR)	0	5	3	8
16	Antigua and Barbuda (ATG)	0	3	0	3
17	Saint Kitts and Nevis (SKN)	0	2	0	2
18	Saint Vincent and the Grenadines (VIN)	0	1	2	3
19	Cuba (CUB)	0	1	0	1
19	Dominica (DMA)	0	1	0	1
21	British Virgin Islands (IVB)	0	0	1	1
21	Haiti (HAI)	0	0	1	1
21	U.S. Virgin Islands (VIR)	0	0	1	1
Totals (23 entries)		39	39	37	115

== See also ==
- 1999 in athletics (track and field)
