= Athletics at the 1999 Pan American Games – Men's 100 metres =

Men's 100 metres at the Pan American Games

The men's 100 metres event at the 1999 Pan American Games was held July 24–25.

== Medalists ==
| Gold | Silver | Bronze |
|---|---|---|
| Bernard Williams; United States | Freddy Mayola; Cuba | Claudinei da Silva; Brazil |

== Results ==
=== Heats ===
Qualification: First 2 of each heat (Q) and the next 2 fastest (q) qualified for the final.

Wind:
Heat 1: +1.6 m/s, Heat 2: -1.0 m/s, Heat 3: -0.5 m/s

| Rank | Heat | Name | Nationality | Time | Notes |
|---|---|---|---|---|---|
| 1 | 3 | Claudinei da Silva | Brazil | 10.19 | Q |
| 2 | 2 | Bernard Williams | United States | 10.28 | Q |
| 3 | 2 | Patrick Jarrett | Jamaica | 10.29 | Q |
| 4 | 1 | Freddy Mayola | Cuba | 10.31 | Q |
| 5 | 2 | André da Silva | Brazil | 10.35 | q |
| 6 | 1 | Tim Harden | United States | 10.40 | Q |
| 7 | 2 | Luis Alberto Pérez-Rionda | Cuba | 10.42 | q |
| 8 | 2 | Nathanaël Esprit | Netherlands Antilles | 10.46 | |
| 9 | 3 | Bradley McCuaig | Canada | 10.48 | Q |
| 10 | 1 | Dwight Ferguson | Bahamas | 10.55 | |
| 11 | 3 | Joel Mascoll | Saint Vincent and the Grenadines | 10.58 | |
| 12 | 3 | Edgardo Serpas | El Salvador | 10.61 | |
| 13 | 1 | Niconnor Alexander | Trinidad and Tobago | 10.62 | |
| 13 | 3 | Carlos Gats | Argentina | 10.62 | |
| 15 | 1 | Ronald Promesse | Saint Lucia | 10.63 | |
| 16 | 3 | Oscar Meneses | Guatemala | 10.65 | |
| 17 | 3 | Ricardo Roach | Chile | 10.69 | |
| 18 | 3 | Caimin Douglas | Netherlands Antilles | 10.74 | |
| 19 | 2 | Devon Bean | Bermuda | 10.83 | |
| 20 | 2 | Sherwin James | Dominica | 10.89 | |
| 21 | 1 | Yvan Darbouze | Haiti | 10.95 | |
| 22 | 1 | Wladimir Afriani | Haiti | 11.04 | |

=== Final ===
Wind: +0.4 m/s

| Rank | Name | Nationality | Time | Notes |
|---|---|---|---|---|
| 1st place, gold medalist(s) | Bernard Williams | United States | 10.08 | |
| 2nd place, silver medalist(s) | Freddy Mayola | Cuba | 10.10 | |
| 3rd place, bronze medalist(s) | Claudinei da Silva | Brazil | 10.13 | |
| 4 | Tim Harden | United States | 10.19 | |
| 5 | André da Silva | Brazil | 10.21 | |
| 6 | Patrick Jarrett | Jamaica | 10.23 | |
| 7 | Luis Alberto Pérez-Rionda | Cuba | 10.27 | |
| 8 | Bradley McCuaig | Canada | 10.31 | |
