= Athletics at the 1999 Pan American Games – Men's 400 metres =

Men's 400 metres at the Pan American Games

The men's 400 metres event at the 1999 Pan American Games was held July 24–25.

== Medalists ==
Gold	Silver	Bronze
Greg Haughton; Jamaica	Danny McCray; United States	Alejandro Cárdenas; Mexico

== Results ==
=== Heats ===
Qualification: First 2 of each heat (Q) and the next 2 fastest (q) qualified for the final.

Rank	Heat	Name	Nationality	Time	Notes
1	2	Sanderlei Parrela	Brazil	44.70	Q
2	2	Alejandro Cárdenas	Mexico	44.98	Q
3	1	Greg Haughton	Jamaica	44.99	Q
4	3	Danny McCray	United States	45.53	Q
5	3	Anderson Jorge dos Santos	Brazil	45.54	Q
6	2	Neil de Silva	Trinidad and Tobago	45.55	q
7	3	Troy McIntosh	Bahamas	45.69	q
8	2	Danny McFarlane	Jamaica	45.71	
9	2	Deon Minor	United States	45.81	
10	2	Shane Niemi	Canada	45.81	
11	1	Avard Moncur	Bahamas	45.97	Q
12	1	Mariano Mesa	Cuba	46.15	
13	3	Carlos Santa	Dominican Republic	46.26	
14	1	Alleyne Francique	Grenada	46.46	
15	2	José Peralta	Dominican Republic	46.52	
16	1	Juan Pedro Toledo	Mexico	46.80	
17	3	Edel Hevia	Cuba	46.81	
18	3	Kenmore Hughes	Antigua and Barbuda	46.94	
19	3	Thomas Dickson	Saint Vincent and the Grenadines	48.28	
	1	Simon Pierre	Trinidad and Tobago	DNF	

=== Final ===
Rank	Name	Nationality	Time	Notes
1st place, gold medalist(s)	Greg Haughton	Jamaica	44.59	
2nd place, silver medalist(s)	Danny McCray	United States	44.83	
3rd place, bronze medalist(s)	Alejandro Cárdenas	Mexico	44.92	
4	Sanderlei Parrela	Brazil	44.93	
5	Neil de Silva	Trinidad and Tobago	45.42	
6	Troy McIntosh	Bahamas	45.60	
7	Anderson Jorge dos Santos	Brazil	45.77	
8	Avard Moncur	Bahamas	45.60	
