= Jean-Marc Destine =

Haitian middle-distance runner

Personal information
- Born: 17 January 1973 (age 53)
- Height: 1.84 m (6 ft 0 in)
- Weight: 73 kg (161 lb)

Sport
- Country: Haiti
- Sport: Athletics
- Event: 800 m
- College team: Blinn College
- Club: Santa Monica Track Club
- Coached by: Joe Douglas

Jean-Marc Destine (born 17 January 1973) is a Haitian retired middle-distance runner who specialised in the 800 metres. He represented his country at the 1996 Summer Olympics, as well as one outdoor and two indoor World Championships.

== International competitions ==
| Year | Competition | Venue | Position | Event | Notes |
Representing Haiti
| 1996 | Olympic Games | Atlanta, United States | 43rd (h) | 800 m | 1:48.82 |
| 1997 | World Indoor Championships | Paris, France | 18th (sf) | 800 m | 1:51.59 |
| 1997 | World Championships | Athens, Greece | 27th (h) | 800 m | 1:47.76 |
| 1998 | Central American and Caribbean Games | Maracaibo, Venezuela | 4th | 800 m | 1:52.30 |
| 1999 | World Indoor Championships | Maebashi, Japan | 19th (h) | 800 m | 1:50.37 |
| 1999 | Pan American Games | Winnipeg, Canada | – | 800 m | DNF |
| 2002 | Central American and Caribbean Games | San Salvador, El Salvador | 4th | 800 m | 1:49.79 |
| 2003 | Central American and Caribbean Championships | St. George's, Grenada | 9th (h) | 800 m | 1:52.96 |
| 2003 | Pan American Games | Santo Domingo, Dominican Republic | 11th (h) | 800 m | 1:51.20 |

== Personal bests ==
Outdoor

- 800 metres – 1:45.79 (Eagle Rock 1996)
- 1000 metres – 2:22.89 (Arnhem 1997)
- 1500 metres - 3:50.25 (San Diego 1997)

Indoor

- 800 metres – 1:47.80 (Sindelfingen 1997)
- 1000 metres – 2:24.88 (Cedar Falls 2000)
