= Rubén Maza =

Venezuelan long-distance runner

Personal information
- Born: June 9, 1967 (age 59)

Sport
- Sport: Track and field
Medal record
Athletics
Representing Venezuela
Pan American Games
Silver medal – second place	1999 Winnipeg	Marathon
South American Games
Gold medal – first place	1994 Valencia	10,000 m
Central American and Caribbean Games
Bronze medal – third place	1998 Maracaibo	Marathon

Rubén Dario Maza Larez (born June 9, 1967) is a long-distance runner from Venezuela.

== Career ==
He represented his native country in the men's marathon (59th place) at the 1996 Summer Olympics in Atlanta, Georgia. He won the silver medal in the same event, three years later at the 1999 Pan American Games.

== Achievements ==
Year	Competition	Venue	Position	Event	Notes
Representing Venezuela
1994	South American Games	Valencia, Venezuela	1st	10,000 m	29:49.1
1995	Pan American Games	Mar del Plata, Argentina	4th	Marathon	2:16:18
1996	Pittsburgh Marathon	Pittsburgh, United States	1st	Marathon	2:12:02
1996	Olympic Games	Atlanta, United States	59th	Marathon	2:23:24
1997	World Championships	Athens, Greece	—	Marathon	DNF
1998	Central American and Caribbean Games	Maracaibo, Venezuela	3rd	Marathon	2:27:46
1999	Pan American Games	Winnipeg, Canada	2nd	Marathon	2:19:56
2002	Central American and Caribbean Games	San Salvador, El Salvador	—	Marathon	DNF
