= Stephanie Best =

American middle-distance runner

Personal information
- Born: October 16, 1969 (age 56) New Orleans, Louisiana, United States

Sport
- Sport: Track and field
Medal record
Women's Athletics
Representing United States
Pan American Games
Bronze medal – third place	1999 Winnipeg	1500m

Stephanie Best (born October 16, 1969) is a retired female track and field athlete from the United States, who competed in the middle distance events. She won the bronze medal in the women's 1500 metres at the 1999 Pan American Games in Winnipeg, Manitoba, Canada.

Best was an All-American runner for the Cornell Big Red track and field team in the NCAA.
