= Davian Clarke =

Jamaican sprinter (born 1976)

Personal information
- Born: 30 April 1976 (age 50) Spanish Town, Jamaica

Sport
- Sport: Track and field
Medal record
Men's athletics
Representing Jamaica
Olympic Games
Bronze medal – third place	1996 Atlanta	4 × 400 m relay
World Championships
Silver medal – second place	1997 Athens	4 × 400 m relay
Silver medal – second place	1999 Seville	4 × 400 m relay
Silver medal – second place	2003 Paris	4 × 400 m relay
Bronze medal – third place	2005 Helsinki	4 × 400 m relay
World Indoor Championships
Gold medal – first place	2003 Birmingham	4 × 400 m relay
Gold medal – first place	2004 Budapest	4 × 400 m relay
Silver medal – second place	2004 Budapest	400 m
Commonwealth Games
Gold medal – first place	1998 Kuala Lumpur	4 × 400 m relay
Bronze medal – third place	2006 Melbourne	4 × 400 m relay
Pan American Games
Gold medal – first place	1999 Winnipeg	4 × 400 m relay
Gold medal – first place	2003 Santo Domingo	4 × 400 m relay
Central American and Caribbean Games
Silver medal – second place	1998 Maracaibo	4 × 400 m relay
CAC Championships
Silver medal – second place	1999 Bridgetown	400 m
Silver medal – second place	1999 Bridgetown	4 × 400 m relay
World Junior Championships
Silver medal – second place	1994 Lisbon	4 × 400 m relay
Silver medal – second place	1992 Seoul	4 × 400 m relay
CARIFTA Games Junior (U20)
Gold medal – first place	1993 Fort-de-France	200 m
Gold medal – first place	1993 Fort-de-France	400 m
Gold medal – first place	1993 Fort-de-France	4 × 400 m relay
CARIFTA Games Youth (U17)
Gold medal – first place	1992 Nassau	200 m
Gold medal – first place	1992 Nassau	400 m
Silver medal – second place	1991 Port of Spain	400 m

Davian Clarke (born 30 April 1976) is a Jamaican former athlete, who mainly competed in the 400 metres. He was born in Spanish Town, St. Catherine and went to St. Catherine Primary & Kingston College HS won the bronze medal in the 4 × 400 metres relay at the 1996 Olympics, and many relay medals followed, before he won his first individual medal at the 2004 IAAF World Indoor Championships. Davian Clarke is also a graduate of University of Miami Patti & Allan Herbert Business School with Bachelor of Business Administration (BBA).

== Achievements ==
Year	Competition	Venue	Position	Event	Notes
Representing Jamaica
1992	World Junior Championships	Seoul, South Korea	2nd	4 × 400 m relay	3:06.58
1994	World Junior Championships	Lisbon, Portugal	19th (qf)	200 m	21.51 (wind: +0.6 m/s)
1994	World Junior Championships	Lisbon, Portugal	2nd	4 × 400 m relay	3:04.12
1996	Summer Olympics	Atlanta, Georgia	3rd	4 × 400 m relay	2:59.42
1997	World Championships	Athens, Greece	2nd	4 × 400 m relay	2:56.75
1998	Central American and Caribbean Games	Maracaibo, Venezuela	4th	400 m	45.31
1998	Central American and Caribbean Games	Maracaibo, Venezuela	2nd	4 × 400 m relay	3:03.26
1998	Commonwealth Games	Kuala Lumpur, Malaysia	1st	4 × 400 m relay	2:59.03 CR
1999	Central American and Caribbean Championships	Bridgetown, Barbados	2nd	400 m	45.49
1999	Central American and Caribbean Championships	Bridgetown, Barbados	2nd	4 × 400 m relay	3:03.82
1999	Pan American Games	Winnipeg, Canada	1st	4 × 400 m relay	2:57.97
1999	World Championships	Seville, Spain	2nd	4 × 400 m relay	2:59.34
2003	World Indoor Championships	Birmingham, UK	1st	4 × 400 m relay	3:04.21
2003	World Championships	Paris, France	2nd	4 × 400 m relay	2:59.60
2003	Pan American Games	Santo Domingo, DR	1st	4 × 400 m relay	3:01.81
2004	World Indoor Championships	Budapest, Hungary	2nd	400 m	45.92
2004	World Indoor Championships	Budapest, Hungary	1st	4 × 400 m relay	3:05.21
2005	World Championships	Helsinki, Finland	3rd	4 × 400 m relay	2:58.07
2006	World Indoor Championships	Moscow, Russia	4th	400 m	45.93
2006	Commonwealth Games	Melbourne, Australia	3rd	4 × 400 m relay	3:01.94

== Personal bests ==
- 200 metres – 20.72 s (1999)
- 400 metres – 44.83 s (2004)
