= Juan Camacho (Mexican athlete) =

Mexican long-distance runner

Juan Camacho (born September 5, 1972) is a Mexican retired long-distance runner who specialized in the marathon. He set his personal best time (2:11:14) in the marathon at the 2002 JTBC Seoul Marathon.

== Achievements ==
Year	Competition	Venue	Position	Event	Notes
Representing Mexico
1998	Central American and Caribbean Games	Maracaibo, Venezuela	1st	Marathon	2:25:25
1999	World Championships	Seville, Spain	38th	Marathon	2:25:18
2000	Cleveland Marathon	Cleveland, United States	5th	Marathon	2:13:43
2001	San Diego Marathon	San Diego, United States	13th	Marathon	2:18:47
2001	Mexico City Marathon	Mexico City, Mexico	5th	Marathon	2:17:53
2002	Torreón La Laguna Marathon	Torreón, Mexico	6th	Marathon	2:13:55
2002	JTBC Seoul Marathon	Seoul, South Korea	10th	Marathon	2:11:14
2003	Pittsburgh Marathon	Pittsburgh, United States	1st	Marathon	2:12:05
2003	Mazatlán Marathon	Mazatlán, Mexico	1st	Marathon	2:14:59
2004	Torreón La Laguna Marathon	Torreón, Mexico	9th	Marathon	2:15:10
2005	Chuncheon Marathon	Chuncheon, South Korea	4th	Marathon	2:17:54
