= Charles Clinger =

American high jumper

Personal information
- Born: December 28, 1976 (age 49) Jackson Hole, Wyoming, U.S.
- Occupation: Attorney
- Height: 6 ft 9 in (2.06 m)
Medal record
Men's Athletics
Representing the United States
Pan American Games
Bronze medal – third place	1999 Winnipeg	High Jump

Charles M. Clinger (born December 28, 1976, in Jackson Hole, Wyoming) is a retired American high jumper.

He won the bronze medal at the 1999 Pan American Games.

His personal best jump is 2.35 meters (7 ft 9 in), achieved in May 2001 in Pocatello, Idaho.

== Personal life ==
Clinger graduated from Star Valley High School (Afton, Wyoming) in 1995. He attended Boise State University, leaving in 1996 for two years as an LDS Missionary in Brisbane, Australia. Clinger returned to the United States in 1998 and attended and competed for Weber State University, graduating in 2001. He later graduated from the UC Davis School of Law and is currently an attorney in Star Valley, Wyoming.
