= Hugo López (athlete) =

Guatemalan racewalker (born 1973)

Personal information
- Full name: Hugo L. López Pérez
- Nationality: Guatemalan
- Born: 1 February 1973 (age 53)
- Height: 1.52 m (5 ft 0 in)
- Weight: 54 kg (119 lb)

Sport
- Sport: Athletics
- Event: Racewalking
Medal record
Representing Guatemala
Central American and Caribbean Games
Silver medal – second place	1998 Maracaibo	50km

Hugo L. López Pérez (born 1 February 1973) is a Guatemalan racewalker. He competed in the men's 50 kilometres walk at the 1996 Summer Olympics.
