= Idalia Hechavarría =

Cuban sprinter (born 1974)

Personal information
- Nationality: Cuban
- Born: 5 June 1974 (age 52) Santiago de Cuba, Cuba

Sport
- Sport: Sprinting
- Event: 4 × 100 metres relay
Medal record
Representing Cuba
Pan American Games
Bronze medal – third place	1999 Winnipeg	4x100m relay
Central American and Caribbean Games
Gold medal – first place	1998 Maracaibo	4x100m relay
Bronze medal – third place	1998 Maracaibo	100m

Idalia Hechavarría Vaillant (born 5 June 1974) is a Cuban sprinter. She competed in the women's 4 × 100 metres relay at the 1996 Summer Olympics.
