= Danny McCray (sprinter) =

American sprinter (born 1974)

Personal information
- Born: March 11, 1974 (age 52)

Sport
- Country: United States
- Sport: Athletics
- Event: Sprinting
Medal record
Pan American Games
Silver medal – second place	1999 Winnipeg	400 m
Bronze medal – third place	1999 Winnipeg	4x400 m relay

Danny McCray (born March 11, 1974) is an American former athlete who competed in sprinting events.

McCray, a Texas state championship winner at Ellison High School, ran for Texas A&M and was a six-time NCAA All-American. He was an NCAA champion in the 4 x 100 metres and made the 400 metres final of the 1997 Summer Universiade. While at Texas A&M he also played on the football team as a wide receiver.

In 1999 he won a Pan American Games silver medal in the 400 metres and was on the U.S. team at the World Championships in Seville, running in the heats of the 4x400 metres.

McCray was an alternate for the 2000 Summer Olympics in Sydney.
