= Torrance Zellner =

American hurdler (born 1970)

Personal information
- Born: January 6, 1970 (age 56) Baltimore, Maryland, United States

Sport
- Sport: Track and field
Medal record
Men's Athletics
Representing United States
Pan American Games
Bronze medal – third place	1991 Havana	400 m hurdles
Bronze medal – third place	1999 Winnipeg	400 m hurdles
Bronze medal – third place	1999 Winnipeg	4 × 400 m relay

Torrance A. Zellner (born January 6, 1970) is an American track and field athlete who won bronze medals in the 400 meter hurdles at the 1991 and 1999 Pan American Games. At the 1999 Pan American Games he also won a bronze medal in 4 × 400 m relay. He finished eighth at the 1999 World Championships in Seville.

Zellner competed in the NCAA for the Florida Gators track and field and Maryland Eastern Shore Hawks track and field teams.

His personal best time was 48.18 seconds, achieved in August 1996 in Zürich.
