= Kenmore Hughes =

Antigua and Barbuda sprinter

Personal information
- Born: 6 July 1970 (age 56)
- Height: 1.75 m (5 ft 9 in)
- Weight: 72 kg (159 lb)

Sport
- Sport: Athletics
- Event: 400 m

Kenmore Henderson Hughes (born 6 July 1970) is a retired sprinter from Antigua and Barbuda who competed primarily in the 400 metres. He represented his country at the 1992 Summer Olympics, as well as four World Championships.

His personal best in the event is 46.83 seconds set in 2001.

== Competition record ==
| Year | Competition | Venue | Position | Event | Notes |
Representing Antigua and Barbuda
| 1992 | Olympic Games | Barcelona, Spain | 66th (h) | 200 m | 22.18 |
| 1992 | Olympic Games | Barcelona, Spain | 56th (h) | 400 m | 48.56 |
| 1993 | Central American and Caribbean Games | Ponce, Puerto Rico | 9th (h) | 200 m | 21.81 |
| 1994 | Commonwealth Games | Victoria, Canada | 33rd (h) | 200 m | 21.65 |
| 1994 | Commonwealth Games | Victoria, Canada | 39th (h) | 400 m | 48.11 |
| 1995 | World Championships | Gothenburg, Sweden | 41st (h) | 400 m | 47.26 |
| 1997 | World Championships | Athens, Greece | 39th (h) | 400 m | 47.11 |
| 1998 | Central American and Caribbean Games | Maracaibo, Venezuela | 8th | 400 m | 47.70 |
| 2001 | World Championships | Edmonton, Canada | 45th (h) | 400 m | 48.18 |
| 2003 | World Championships | Paris, France | 44th (h) | 400 m | 48.36 |
