= Beverly Grant (sprinter) =

Jamaican sprinter (born 1970)

Personal information
- Born: 25 September 1970 (age 55)

Sport
- Sport: Track and field
Medal record
Women's athletics
Representing Jamaica
World Championships
Silver medal – second place	1997 Athens	4 × 100 m relay
World Indoor Championships
Gold medal – first place	1993 Toronto	4 × 400 m relay
Pan American Games
Gold medal – first place	1999 Winnipeg	4x100 m relay

Beverly Grant (born 25 September 1970) is a former Jamaican sprinter. She won a gold medal at the 1993 World Indoor Championships held in Toronto, a silver medal at the 1997 World Championships in Athens, and won the 4 × 100 metres relay at the Pan American Games held in Winnipeg.

Grant competed for the Central State Lady Marauders track and field team in the NCAA.
