= Adalberto Mendez (athlete) =

Dominican sprinter (born 1974)

Adalberto Mendez (born 23 October 1974) is a former Dominican sprinter who competed in the men's 100m competition at the 1996 Summer Olympics. He recorded a 10.60, not enough to qualify for the next round past the heats. His personal best is 10.53, set in 1995.
