= Julieon Raeburn =

Trinidad and Tobago sprinter

Personal information
- Born: 18 September 1978 (age 47) Trincity, Trinidad and Tobago

Sport
- Sport: Track and field

Julieon Raeburn (born 18 September 1978) is a sprinter from Trinidad and Tobago who specializes in the 200 metres.

Raeburn competed for the Abilene Christian Wildcats track and field and Texas Tech Red Raiders track and field team teams in the NCAA.

== Achievements ==
Year	Competition	Venue	Position	Event	Notes
Representing Trinidad and Tobago
1998	Central American and Caribbean Games	Maracaibo, Venezuela	5th	200 m	
1998	Central American and Caribbean Games	Maracaibo, Venezuela	4th	4x100 m relay	
2002	Commonwealth Games	Manchester, England	5th	4x100 m relay	
2003	Pan American Games	Santo Domingo, Dom. Rep.	6th	200 m	
2003	Central American and Caribbean Championships	St. George's, Grenada	2nd	200 m	
2004	South American U23 Championships	Barquisimeto, Venezuela	5th (h)	200m	21.18 (wind: -0.6 m/s)
2005	Central American and Caribbean Championships	Nassau, Bahamas	5th	200 m	
