= Niconnor Alexander =

Trinidad and Tobago sprinter

Personal information
- Born: 4 February 1977 (age 49) San Fernando, Trinidad and Tobago

Sport
- Sport: Track and field
Medal record
Men's Athletics
Representing Trinidad and Tobago
Pan American Games
Silver medal – second place	2003 Santo Domingo	4x100 m relay
Central American and Caribbean Games
Bronze medal – third place	1998 Maracaibo	4x100 m relay
NACAC Championships
Bronze medal – third place	2007 San Salvador	4x100 m relay

Niconnor "Nico" Alexander (born 4 February 1977) is a sprinter from Trinidad and Tobago who specialized in the 100 metres.

He attended Abilene Christian University, Texas, USA and graduated with a BS in industrial technology in 2003.

== International competitions ==
Year	Competition	Venue	Position	Notes
1995	CARIFTA Games (U20)	George Town, Cayman Islands	3rd	4 × 100 m relay
1998	Central American and Caribbean Games	Maracaibo, Venezuela	3rd	4 × 100 m relay
1999	Pan American Games	Winnipeg, Canada	5th	4 × 100 m relay
2003	Pan American Games	Santo Domingo, Dominican Republic	8th	100 m
2003	Pan American Games	Santo Domingo, Dominican Republic	2nd	4 × 100 m relay
2004	World Indoor Championships	Budapest, Hungary	8th	60 m
2004	Olympic Games	Athens, Greece	7th	4 × 100 m relay
2007	NACAC Championships	San Salvador, El Salvador	3rd	4 × 100 m relay
