= Tracey Ann Barnes =

Jamaican sprinter (born 1975)

Personal information
- Nationality: Jamaican
- Born: 28 June 1975 (age 50)

Sport
- Sport: Sprinting
- Event: 4 × 400 metres relay

Tracey Ann Barnes (born 28 June 1975) is a Jamaican sprinter. She competed in the women's 4 × 400 metres relay at the 1996 Summer Olympics.
