= Patrick Jarrett =

Jamaican sprinter (born 1972)

Personal information
- Born: 2 October 1972 (age 54)

Sport
- Sport: Track and field
Medal record
Representing Jamaica
CAC Championships
Bronze medal – third place	1999 Bridgetown	100 metres
Pan American Games
Bronze medal – third place	1999 Winnipeg	4×100 metres relay

Patrick "Pat" Jarrett (born 2 October 1972) is a Jamaican sprinter who specialised in the 100 metres. He represented Jamaica at the 2000 and 2004 Summer Olympics. He was also the 1999 Jamaican 100 m champion and a quarter-finalist at the 1999 World Championships in Athletics.

He won the 100 m bronze at the 1999 CAC Championships and helped the Jamaican relay team to the bronze at the 1999 Pan American Games. He received a doping ban for two years in 2001, after testing positive for stanozolol at the Jamaican Championships.

Currently coaching Current athletes include Barbara Pierre (2016 World 60m Champion, 2008 Beijing 100m Olympian and 2011 Pan American Games 100m Silver Medalist) and Ramon Gittens ( 2016 60m Bronze Medalist, 2012 Olympian, 2012 Barbados 100m National Champion) Desmond Lawrence (2017 4th US Indoor Championships)16 World 60m Champion, 2008 Beijing 100m Olympian and 2011 Pan American Games 100m Silver Medalist).

Sprint Coach, Athletes in Action – Youth USATF (Raleigh, NC) 2015–Present Sprint specialist for the 100m, 200m, 400m and Sprint relays

Sprint Coach, Enloe HS (Raleigh, NC) 2017–Present Sprint specialist for the 100m, 200m, 400m and Sprint relays.

Sprint Coach, Saudi Arabia Federation (Raleigh, NC) March – May 2017 Sprint specialist for the 100m, 200m, 400m and Sprint relays

Sprint Coach, Virginia Beach Flames – Youth AAU (Virginia Beach, VA) 2010, 2009 Sprint specialist for the 100m, 200m, 400m and Sprint relays. Coached several athletes to the 2010 and 2009 Nationals including 2009 Girls 100m and 200m National AAU Champion

== Career ==
Jarrett originally started out running for Farmingdale High School in Long Island, New York, where he was ranked #1 in the 100 m in New York state from 1990 to 1991. Afterwards, he attended St. John's University and starred on the track team from 1991 until he dropped out in 1993, academically ineligible. After a modest but short career at St. John's, he moved to New York Tech to continue running. He came to prominence in 1999 when he won the bronze medal in the 100 m at the 1999 CAC Championships, finishing behind Obadele Thompson and Kim Collins. He was selected for the 4×100 metres relay team at the 1999 Pan American Games and the squad won the bronze in at time of 38.82 seconds. He won the 100 m at the Jamaican Championships that year, running a time of 10.30 seconds. He was Jamaica's only representative in the 100 m at the 1999 World Championships in Athletics and he reached the quarter-finals stage but was knocked out as he finished fifth in his race. Regardless, his time of 10.22 seconds was a new personal best. Along with Garth Robinson, Christopher Williams and Ray Stewart, he finished fifth (upgraded to fourth after Nigeria was disqualified) in the heats of the 4×100 metres relay in his second competition of the championships.

He improved his personal best to 10.14 seconds at the National Championships in 2000, and his third place behind Williams and Lindel Frater finish guaranteed him a place in the Jamaican Olympic team. He reached the second round of the 100 m, along with his compatriots, at the 2000 Sydney Olympics but he finished last in his race, pulling up before the finish line. He was not selected for the relay at the Olympics and the Jamaican team of Frater, Dwight Thomas, Williams and Llewellyn Bredwood set a national record in the final.

At the 2001 Penn Relays Jarrett helped the Jamaican team including Donovan Powell, Byron Logan and Chris Williams to third place with a time of 38.68 seconds. He also improved his 100 m best to 10.12 seconds, ahead of Mark Lewis-Francis. He finished second at the Jamaican National Championships that year but his doping test from the competition was positive for the banned steroid stanozolol. He contested the test but the IAAF upheld the decision and he was banned from athletics for a period of two years.

He returned from the ban in 2003 and his next major appearance came at the 2004 Athens Olympics. He did not earn an individual spot, but was chosen for the relay and a team comprising Dwight Thomas, Jarrett, Winston Smith and Michael Frater recorded a time of 38.71 seconds for fourth in the heats (which was not enough to make the final). In 2005 he was fifth at both the IAAF Meeting Zagreb and the Tsiklitiria meeting in Athens (where he ran a season's best of 10.15 seconds).

== Personal bests ==
Event	Time (sec)	Venue	Date
60 metres	6.50	The Armory, New York City, United States	20 February 1999
100 metres	10.12	Philadelphia, United States	28 April 2001
200 metres	20.87	Raleigh, North Carolina, United States	1 April 2000

- All information taken from IAAF profile.

== See also ==
- List of doping cases in athletics
