= Natasha Alleyne =

Trinidad and Tobago high jumper

Personal information
- Nationality: Trinidad and Tobago
- Born: Natasha Gibson; 12 July 1969 (age 57)

Sport
- Sport: Athletics
- Event: High jump

Natasha Lynette Barbara Alleyne-Forte (née Gibson; born 12 July 1969) is a Trinidad and Tobago former athlete. She competed in the women's high jump at the 1996 Summer Olympics.

Competing for the Georgia Tech Yellow Jackets track and field team, Alleyne won the 1992 high jump at the NCAA Division I Indoor Track and Field Championships with a jump of 1.89 metres.
