= Sherline Williams =

Barbadian sprinter (born 1977)

Personal information
- Nationality: Barbadian
- Born: 20 July 1977 (age 48)

Sport
- Sport: Sprinting
- Event: 4 × 400 metres relay

Sherline Williams (born 20 July 1977) is a Barbadian sprinter. She competed in the women's 4 × 400 metres relay at the 2000 Summer Olympics.
