= Garth Robinson =

Jamaican sprinter

Personal information
- Born: 11 October 1970 (age 56) London, England
Medal record
Men's athletics
Representing Jamaica
Olympic Games
Bronze medal – third place	1996 Atlanta	4×400 m relay
World Indoor Championships
Silver medal – second place	1997 Paris	4x400 m relay
Pan American Games
Bronze medal – third place	1999 Winnipeg	4×100 m relay
Central American and Caribbean Games
Silver medal – second place	1998 Maracaibo	4x100 m relay
Summer Universiade
Silver medal – second place	1997 Catania	4x400 m relay

Garth Barrington Robinson (born 11 October 1970 in London) is a retired male track and field athlete from Jamaica. Robinson won a bronze medal at the 1996 Summer Olympics in Atlanta.

Robinson competed for the Oral Roberts Golden Eagles track and field team in the NCAA. He later became the head coach of the Harris–Stowe State Hornets track and field team.
