= Athletics at the 1999 Pan American Games =

- Dates: July 24–30
- Host city: Winnipeg, Manitoba, Canada
- Venue: University Stadium
- Level: Senior
- Events: 46
- Participation: 446 athletes from 38 nations

The athletics competition at the 1999 Pan American Games was held at University Stadium in Winnipeg, Manitoba, Canada. Two new events were introduced for women: pole vault and hammer throw. In addition the 20 km road walk replaced the 10,000 m track walk.

== Men's results ==
=== Track ===
Event	Gold		Silver		Bronze	
100 metres (Wind: +0.4 m/s)	Bernard Williams; United States	10.08	Freddy Mayola; Cuba	10.10	Claudinei da Silva; Brazil	10.13
200 metres (Wind: −1.9 m/s)	Claudinei da Silva; Brazil	20.30	Curtis Perry; USA	20.58	Sebastián Keitel; Chile	20.82
400 metres	Greg Haughton; Jamaica	44.59	Danny McCray; USA	44.83	Alejandro Cárdenas; Mexico	44.92
800 metres	Johnny Gray; USA	1:45.38	Norberto Téllez; Cuba	1:45.40	Zach Whitmarsh; Canada	1:45.94
1500 metres	Graham Hood; Canada	3:41.20	Michael Stember; United States	3:41.96	Hudson de Souza; Brazil	3:42.18
5000 metres	David Galván; Mexico	13:42.04	Elenilson da Silva; Brazil	13:43.13	Jeff Schiebler; Canada	13:43.66
10,000 metres	Elenilson da Silva; Brazil	28:43.50	David Galván; Mexico	28:44.03	Pete Julian; United States	28:44.55
Marathon	Vanderlei de Lima; Brazil	2:17:20	Rubén Maza; Venezuela	2:19:56	Éder Fialho; Brazil	2:20:09
3000 metres steeplechase	Joël Bourgeois; Canada	8:35.03	Francis O'Neill; United States	8:35.73	Jean-Nicolas Duval; Canada	8:39.52
110 metres hurdles (Wind: +1.1 m/s)	Anier García; Cuba	13.17 GR	Yoel Hernández; Cuba	13.24	Eugene Swift; United States	13.41
400 metres hurdles	Eronilde de Araújo; Brazil	48.23 GR	Eric Thomas; United States	48.40	Torrance Zellner; United States	48.45
4 × 100 metres relay	Brazil; Raphael de Oliveira; Claudinei da Silva; Édson Ribeiro; André da Silva	38.18 GR	Canada; Trevino Betty; Donovan Bailey; Glenroy Gilbert; Bradley McCuaig	38.49	Jamaica] Dwight Thomas; Garth Robinson; Patrick Jarrett; Christopher Williams	38.82
4 × 400 metres relay	Jamaica; Michael McDonald; Greg Haughton; Danny McFarlane; Davian Clarke; Paston Coke*	2:57.97 GR	Brazil; Sanderlei Parrela; Claudinei da Silva; Anderson Jorge dos Santos; Eronilde de Araújo; Cleverson da Silva*	2:58.56	United States; Danny McCray; Deon Minor; Torrance Zellner; Alvin Harrison	3:00.94
20 kilometres walk	Bernardo Segura; Mexico	1:20:17	Daniel García; Mexico	1:20:28	Jefferson Pérez; Ecuador	1:20:46
50 kilometres walk	Joel Sánchez; Mexico	4:06:31	Carlos Mercenario; Mexico	4:09:48	Philip Dunn; USA	4:13:45
WR world record | AR area record | CR championship record | GR games record | NR national record | OR Olympic record | PB personal best | SB season best | WL world leading (in a given season)

=== Field ===
Event	Gold		Silver		Bronze	
High jump	Kwaku Boateng; Canada; Mark Boswell; Canada	2.25	-	-	Charles Clinger; United States	2.25
Pole vault	Pat Manson; United States	5.60	Scott Hennig; United States	5.55	Jason Pearce; Canada	5.30
Long jump	Iván Pedroso; Cuba	8.52	Kareem Streete-Thompson; Cayman Islands	8.12	Luis Felipe Méliz; Cuba	8.06
Triple jump	Yoelbi Quesada; Cuba	17.19	LaMark Carter; USA	17.09	Michael Calvo; Cuba	17.03
Shot put	Brad Mears; United States	19.93	Jamie Beyer; United States	18.95	Bradley Snyder; Canada	18.74
Discus throw	Anthony Washington; USA	64.25	Alexis Elizalde; Cuba	61.99	Jason Tunks; Canada	61.75
Hammer throw	Lance Deal; United States	79.61 GR	Kevin McMahon; United States	73.41	Juan Ignacio Cerra; Argentina	70.68
Javelin throw	Emeterio González; Cuba	77.46	Máximo Rigondeaux; Cuba	76.24	Tom Petranoff; United States	75.95
Decathlon	Chris Huffins; United States	8170 pts GR	Dan Steele; United States	8070 pts	Raúl Duany; Cuba	7730 pts
WR world record | AR area record | CR championship record | GR games record | NR national record | OR Olympic record | PB personal best | SB season best | WL world leading (in a given season)

== Women's results ==
=== Track ===
Event	Gold		Silver		Bronze	
100 metres (Wind: +1.7 m/s)	Chandra Sturrup; Bahamas	11.10	Angela Williams; United States	11.16	Peta-Gaye Dowdie; Jamaica	11.20
200 metres (Wind: +0.7 m/s)	Debbie Ferguson; Bahamas	22.83	Lucimar de Moura; Brazil	23.03	Felipa Palacios; Colombia	23.05
400 metres	Ana Guevara; Mexico	50.91	Michelle Collins; USA	51.21	Claudine Williams; Jamaica	51.58
800 metres	Letitia Vriesde; Suriname	1:59.95	Zulia Calatayud; Cuba	2:00.67	Meredith Valmon; USA	2:01.51
1500 metres	Marla Runyan; United States	4:16.86	Leah Pells; Canada	4:16.86	Stephanie Best; United States	4:18.44
5000 metres	Adriana Fernández; Mexico	15:56.57	Bertha Sánchez; Colombia	15:59.04	Blake Phillips; United States	15:59.77
10,000 metres	Nora Rocha; Mexico	32:56.51	Stella Castro; Colombia	33:05.97 NR	Tina Connelly; Canada	33:27.87
Marathon	Erika Olivera; Chile	2:37:41 GR	Iglandini González; Colombia	2:40:06	Viviany de Oliveira; Brazil	2:40:55
100 metres hurdles (Wind: +1.2 m/s)	Aliuska López; Cuba	12.76 GR	Maurren Maggi; Brazil	12.86	Miesha McKelvy; USA	12.91
400 metres hurdles	Daimí Pernía; Cuba	53.44 GR	Andrea Blackett; Barbados	53.98	Michelle Johnson; United States	54.22
4 × 100 metres relay	Jamaica; Kerry-Ann Richards; Aleen Bailey; Beverly Grant; Peta-Gaye Dowdie	42.62 GR	United States; Shelia Burrell; Passion Richardson; Angela Williams; Torri Edwards	43.27	Cuba; Misleidys Lazo; Idalia Hechavarría; Mercedes Carnesolta; Virgen Benavides	43.52
4 × 400 metres relay	Cuba; Julia Duporty; Zulia Calatayud; Idalmis Bonne; Daimí Pernía	3:26.70	United States; Shanelle Porter; Yulanda Nelson; Michelle Collins; Andrea Anderson	3:27.50	Barbados; Joanne Durant; Andrea Blackett; Melissa Straker; Tanya Oxley	3:30.72
20 kilometres walk	Graciela Mendoza; Mexico	1:34:19	Rosario Sánchez; Mexico	1:34:46	Michelle Rohl; United States	1:35:22
WR world record | AR area record | CR championship record | GR games record | NR national record | OR Olympic record | PB personal best | SB season best | WL world leading (in a given season)

=== Field ===
Event	Gold		Silver		Bronze	
High jump	Solange Witteveen; Argentina	1.88	Luciane Dambacher; Brazil	1.85	Nicole Forrester; Canada	1.85
Pole vault	Alejandra García; Argentina	4.30	Kellie Suttle; USA	4.25	Déborah Gyurcsek; Uruguay	4.15
Long jump	Maurren Maggi; Brazil	6.59	Angela Brown; USA	6.51	Elva Goulbourne; Jamaica	6.41
Triple jump	Yamilé Aldama; Cuba	14.77 GR	Suzette Lee; Jamaica	14.09	Magdelín Martínez; Cuba	13.98
Shot put	Connie Price-Smith; United States	19.06	Yumileidi Cumbá; Cuba	18.67	Teri Tunks; United States	18.03
Discus throw	Elisangela Adriano; Brazil	60.92	Aretha Hill; United States	59.06	Kris Kuehl; United States	57.21
Hammer throw	Dawn Ellerbe; USA	65.36 GR	Yipsi Moreno; Cuba	63.03	Caroline Wittrin; Canada	61.28
Javelin throw	Osleidys Menéndez; Cuba	65.85	Xiomara Rivero; Cuba	62.46	Laverne Eve; Bahamas	61.24
Heptathlon	Magalys García; Cuba	6290 pts GR	Shelia Burrell; United States	6244 pts	Nicole Haynes; United States	6000 pts
WR world record | AR area record | CR championship record | GR games record | NR national record | OR Olympic record | PB personal best | SB season best | WL world leading (in a given season)

== Medal table ==
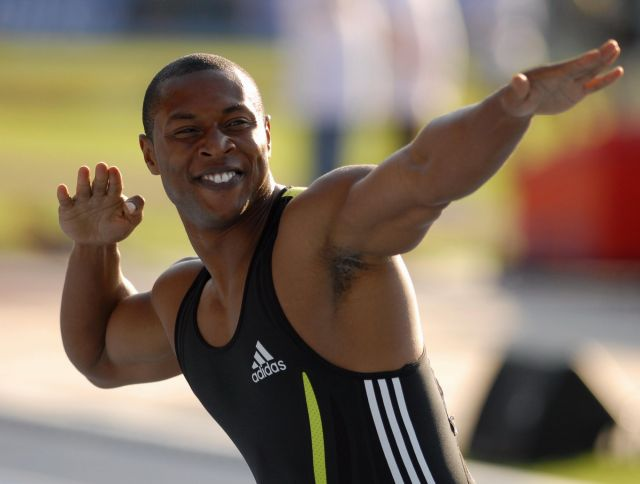
Bernard Williams won the men's 100 m gold for the United States.

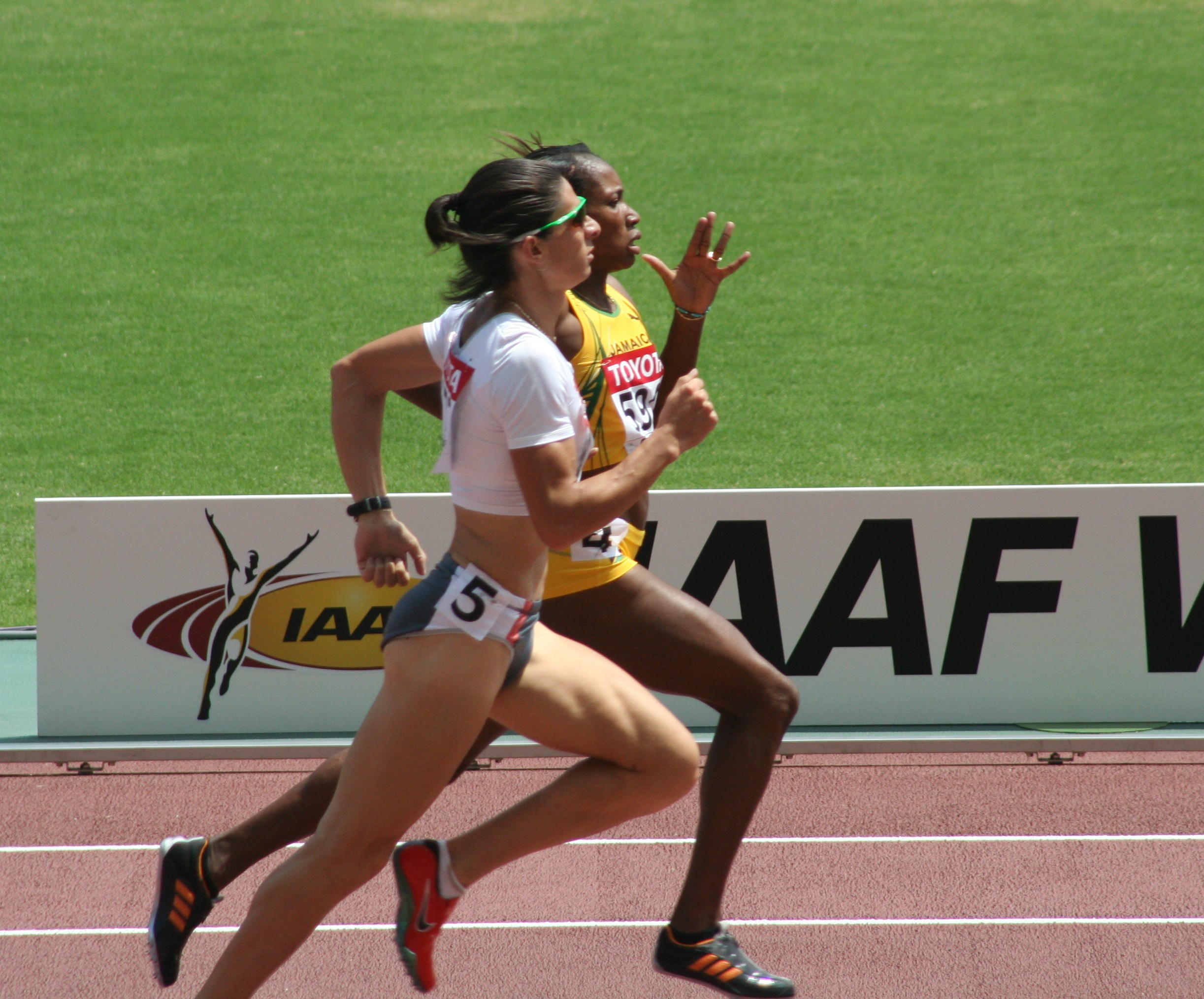
In 1999, Ana Guevara of Mexico won the first of her three 400 m titles.

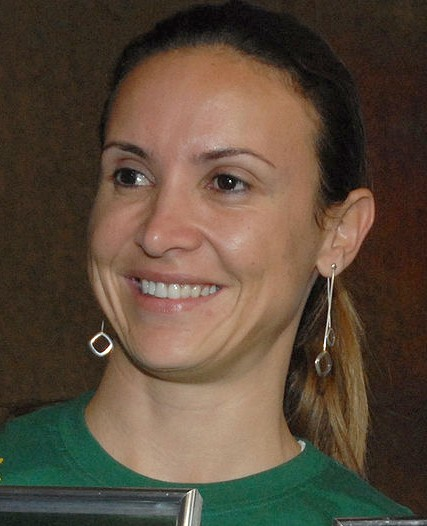
Brazil's Maurren Maggi took long jump gold and 100 m hurdles silver.

* Host nation (Canada)

Rank	Nation	Gold	Silver	Bronze	Total
1	United States	10	18	16	44
2	Cuba	10	9	5	24
3	Brazil	7	5	4	16
4	Mexico	7	4	1	12
5	Canada*	4	2	9	15
6	Jamaica	3	1	4	8
7	Argentina	2	0	1	3
7	Bahamas	2	0	1	3
9	Chile	1	0	1	2
10	Suriname	1	0	0	1
11	Colombia	0	3	1	4
12	Barbados	0	1	1	2
13	Cayman Islands	0	1	0	1
13	Venezuela	0	1	0	1
15	Ecuador	0	0	1	1
15	Uruguay	0	0	1	1
Totals (16 entries)		47	45	46	138

== Participating nations ==
- Antigua and Barbuda (5)
- Argentina (13)
- Bahamas (16)
- Barbados (7)
- Belize (1)
- Bermuda (3)
- Bolivia (2)
- Brazil (29)
- Canada (54)
- Cayman Islands (2)
- Chile (12)
- Colombia (15)
- Costa Rica (3)
- Cuba (48)
- Dominica (2)
- Dominican Republic (6)
- Ecuador (11)
- El Salvador (4)
- Guatemala (7)
- Grenada (2)
- Guyana (3)
- Haiti (7)
- Honduras (1)
- Jamaica (30)
- Mexico (30)
- Netherlands Antilles (4)
- Paraguay (2)
- Peru (2)
- Puerto Rico (2)
- Saint Lucia (8)
- Saint Kitts and Nevis (1)
- Saint Vincent and the Grenadines (4)
- Suriname (1)
- Trinidad and Tobago (9)
- United States (86)
- Virgin Islands (3)
- Uruguay (6)
- Venezuela (5)

== See also ==
- 1999 in athletics (track and field)
