= Jorge Crusellas =

Cuban sprinter (born 1966)

Personal information
- Born: July 28, 1966 (age 59)
Medal record
Men's Athletics
Representing Cuba
Pan American Games
Gold medal – first place	1995 Mar del Plata	4x400 m

Jorge Luis Crusellas Álvarez (born July 28, 1966, in Pinar del Río) is a retired male sprinter from Cuba. He claimed a gold medal in the Men's 4x400 metres relay at the 1995 Pan American Games in Mar del Plata, Argentina. Crusellas set his personal best in the men's 400 metres (45.65) in 1995.
