= Edel Hevia =

Cuban sprinter (born 1977)

Personal information
- Born: 22 February 1977 (age 49)

Sport
- Sport: Track and field
Medal record
Representing Cuba
Central American and Caribbean Games
Gold medal – first place	1998 Maracaibo	4x400m relay

Edel Hevia (born 22 February 1977) is a retired Cuban sprinter.
