= Joanne Durant =

Barbadian sprinter

Personal information
- Nationality: Barbadian
- Born: 18 April 1975 (age 51)
Medal record
Women's Athletics
Representing Barbados
Pan American Games
Bronze medal – third place	1999 Winnipeg	4x400m

Joanne Durant-Littleton (born 25 May 1975) is a retired female track and field sprinter from Barbados, who represented her native country at the 2000 Summer Olympics in Sydney, Australia. She won a bronze medal in the women's 4x400 metres relay at the 1999 Pan American Games, alongside Melissa Straker, Andrea Blackett, and Tanya Oxley.

== Personal Bests ==
Event	Result	Date	Venue
100m	11.52	6/5/2000	Houston (USA)
200m	23.02	11/5/2000	College Station (USA)
400m	54.23	24/3/2000	Houston (USA)
