= Melissa Straker =

Barbadian sprinter (born 1976)

Personal information
- Born: January 23, 1976 (age 50)
Medal record
Women's athletics
Representing Barbados
Pan American Games
Bronze medal – third place	1999 Winnipeg	4x400m
CARIFTA Games Junior (U20)
Bronze medal – third place	1993 Fort-de-France	4x400m relay
Bronze medal – third place	1994 Bridgetown	4x400m relay
Bronze medal – third place	1995 George Town	4x400m relay

Melissa Straker-Taylor (born January 23, 1976) is a retired female track and field sprinter from Barbados, who twice represented her native country at the Summer Olympics: 1996 and 2000. She won a bronze medal in the women's 4x400 metres relay at the 1999 Pan American Games, alongside Joanne Durant, Andrea Blackett, and Tanya Oxley.

Running for the Rice Owls track and field team, Straker won the 1997 4 × 400 meter relay at the NCAA Division I Indoor Track and Field Championships.
