= Dwight Ferguson =

Bahamian sprinter

Personal information
- Born: 16 May 1970 (age 56)
Medal record
Men's Athletics
Representing Bahamas
Central American and Caribbean Games
Silver medal – second place	1998 Maracaibo	100 m

Dwight K. Ferguson (born 16 May 1970) is a former sprinter who competed for the Bahamas. He competed in the professional level nationally, Internationally and the European Circuit pre/post major international track and field championships. He won the silver medal in the men's 100 metres at the 1998 Central American and Caribbean Games, and competed professionally for his native country at the 1996 Summer Olympics in Atlanta, Georgia, and the Senior Pan Am Games. Dwight also competed at many professional races in the United States until retirement with a career ending injury in 2006.
