= List of Cuban Athletics Championships winners =

The Cuban Athletics Championships (Spanish: Campeonato Cubano de Atletismo) is an annual track and field competition which serves as the national championship for Cuba. It is organised by Cuban Athletics Federation, Cuba's national governing body for the sport of athletics.< The national championship has been contested within different meetings, principally either the Copa Cuba or the Barrientos Memorial. The competition has also been held in conjunction with the Olimpiada del Deporte Cubano when that competition is held.

== Men ==
=== 100 metres ===
- 1986: Osvaldo Lara
- 1987: Ricardo Chacón
- 1988: Andrés Simón
- 1989: Ricardo Chacón
- 1990: Andrés Simón
- 1991: Joel Isasi
- 1992: Andrés Simón
- 1993: Joel Isasi
- 1994: Leonardo Prevost
- 1995: Joel Isasi
- 1996: Luis Alberto Pérez-Rionda
- 1997: Luis Alberto Pérez-Rionda
- 1998: Freddy Mayola
- 1999: Luis Alberto Pérez-Rionda
- 2000: Freddy Mayola
- 2001: Freddy Mayola
- 2002: Juan Pita
- 2003: Luis Alexander Reyes
- 2004: Juan Pita
- 2005: Luis Alexander Reyes
- 2006: Henry Vizcaíno

=== 200 metres ===
- 1986: Sergio Querol
- 1987: Leandro Peñalver
- 1988: Roberto Hernández
- 1989: Félix Stevens
- 1990: Leandro Peñalver
- 1991: Joel Lamela
- 1992: Iván García
- 1993: Iván García
- 1994: Jorge Aguilera
- 1995: Iván García
- 1996: Iván García
- 1997: Gabriel González
- 1998: Misael Ortiz
- 1999: Iván García
- 2000: Iván García
- 2001: Alianni Hechevarría
- 2002: Alianni Hechevarría
- 2003: Juan Pita
- 2004: Luis Alexander Reyes
- 2005: Luis Alexander Reyes
- 2006: Michel Herrera

=== 400 metres ===
- 1986: Félix Stevens
- 1987: Roberto Hernández
- 1988: Roberto Hernández
- 1989: Jorge Valentín
- 1990: Roberto Hernández
- 1991: Roberto Hernández
- 1992: Roberto Hernández
- 1993: Robelis Darroman
- 1994: Norberto Téllez
- 1995: Norberto Téllez
- 1996: Norberto Téllez
- 1997: Norberto Téllez
- 1998: Georkis Vera
- 1999: Norberto Téllez
- 2000: Norberto Téllez
- 2001: Edel Evia
- 2002: Glauder Garzón
- 2003: Yeimer López
- 2004: Glauder Garzón
- 2005: William Collazo
- 2006: Yeimer López

=== 800 metres ===
- 1986: Roberto Ramos
- 1987: Raúl Mesa
- 1988: Raúl Mesa
- 1989: Héctor Herrera
- 1990: Héctor Herrera
- 1991: Ángel Carnesolta
- 1992: Héctor Herrera
- 1993: Osiris Mora
- 1994: Alain Miranda
- 1995: Norberto Téllez
- 1996: Alain Miranda
- 1997: Norberto Téllez
- 1998: Norberto Téllez
- 1999: Omar Torres
- 2000: Omar Torres
- 2001: Norberto Téllez
- 2002: Yeimer López
- 2003: José Luis Ricol
- 2004: Bayron Piedra (ECU)
- 2005: Yeimer López
- 2006: Maury Surel Castillo

=== 1500 metres ===
- 1986: Félix Mesa
- 1987: Omar Molina
- 1988: Amado Ramos
- 1989: Roilando Delís
- 1990: Raúl Mesa
- 1991: Amado Ramos
- 1992: Amado Ramos
- 1993: Silvio García
- 1994: Amado Ramos
- 1995: Amado Ramos
- 1996: Bismark Ramírez
- 1997: Ereisis Torres
- 1998: Ereisis Torres
- 1999: Ismael Iglesias
- 2000: Ereisis Torres
- 2001: Ereisis Torres
- 2002: Maury Surel Castillo
- 2003: Maury Surel Castillo
- 2004: Bayron Piedra (ECU)
- 2005: Maury Surel Castillo
- 2006: Maury Surel Castillo

=== 5000 metres ===
- 1986: Juan Jesús Linares
- 1987: Juan Jesús Linares
- 1988: Juan Ramón Conde
- 1989: Juan Ramón Conde
- 1990: Juan Ramón Conde
- 1991: Juan Ramón Conde
- 1992: Juan Ramón Conde
- 1993: Juan Ramón Conde
- 1994: Luis Cadet
- 1995: Amado Ramos
- 1996: Ismael Iglesias
- 1997: Ismael Iglesias
- 1998: Ismael Iglesias
- 1999: Geovanny Santana
- 2000: Henry Jaén
- 2001: Aguelmis Rojas
- 2002: Henry Jaén
- 2003: Norbert Gutiérrez
- 2004: Maury SurelCastillo
- 2005: Liván Luque
- 2006: José Alberto Sánchez

=== 10,000 metres ===
- 1986: Alberto Cuba
- 1987: Alberto Cuba
- 1988: Alberto Cuba
- 1989: Alberto Cuba
- 1990: Ángel Rodríguez
- 1991: Ángel Rodríguez
- 1992: Ángel Rodríguez
- 1993: Ángel Rodríguez
- 1994: Alberto Cuba
- 1995: Luis Cadet
- 1996: Ángel Ferreiro
- 1997: Luis Cadet
- 1998: ?
- 1999: Alberto Cuba
- 2000: Aguelmis Rojas
- 2001: Aguelmis Rojas
- 2002: Aguelmis Rojas
- 2003: Norbert Gutiérrez
- 2004: ?
- 2005: Aguelmis Rojas
- 2006: Norbert Gutiérrez

=== Marathon ===
- 1986: Andrés Chávez
- 1987: Dimas Álvarez
- 1988: Dimas Álvarez
- 1989: José Rodríguez
- 1990: Dimas Álvarez
- 1991: Alberto Cuba
- 1992: ?
- 1993: ?
- 1994: ?
- 1995: José Rodríguez
- 1996: ?
- 1997: Alexis Cuba
- 1998: Irán Trutié
- 1999: Alberto Cuba
- 2000: ?
- 2001: ?
- 2002: ?
- 2003: Yosbel Arboláez
- 2004: Aguelmis Rojas
- 2005: ?
- 2006: ?

=== 3000 metres steeplechase ===
- 1986: Juan Ramón Conde
- 1987: Ángel Rodríguez
- 1988: Juan Ramón Conde
- 1989: Juan Ramón Conde
- 1990: Juan Ramón Conde
- 1991: Juan Ramón Conde
- 1992: Juan Ramón Conde
- 1993: Juan Ramón Conde
- 1994: Juan Ramón Conde
- 1995: Romelio Vergolla
- 1996: Ismael Iglesias
- 1997: Romelio Vergolla
- 1998: Ismael Iglesias
- 1999: Ismael Iglesias
- 2000: Yunier González
- 2001: Bismark Ramírez
- 2002: Bismark Ramírez
- 2003: Yoandri Caraballo
- 2004: Yandri Chivás
- 2005: Osmani Calzado
- 2006: José Alberto Sánchez

=== 110 metres hurdles ===
- 1986: Juan Saborit
- 1987: Jacinto Álvarez
- 1988: Emilio Valle
- 1989: Emilio Valle
- 1990: Manuel Mayor
- 1991: Omar Portuondo
- 1992: Emilio Valle
- 1993: Emilio Valle
- 1994: Emilio Valle
- 1995: Emilio Valle
- 1996: Erik Batte
- 1997: Anier García
- 1998: Anier García
- 1999: Anier García
- 2000: Anier García
- 2001: Emilio Valle
- 2002: Yoel Hernández
- 2003: Yuniel Hernández
- 2004: Yuniel Hernández
- 2005: Anier García
- 2006: Dayron Robles

=== 400 metres hurdles ===
- 1986: Francisco Velazco
- 1987: Emilio Valle
- 1988: Francisco Velazco
- 1989: Francisco Velazco
- 1990: Francisco Velazco
- 1991: Juan Hernández
- 1992: Juan Hernández
- 1993: Pedro Piñera
- 1994: José Pérez
- 1995: José Pérez
- 1996: Alexis Sánchez
- 1997: José Pérez
- 1998: Emilio Valle
- 1999: Jaciel Zamora
- 2000: Jorge Moreno
- 2001: Neil Gardner (JAM)
- 2002: Sergio Hierrezuelo
- 2003: Sergio Hierrezuelo
- 2004: Sergio Hierrezuelo
- 2005: Sergio Hierrezuelo
- 2006: Yusbel Poll

=== High jump ===
- 1986: Javier Sotomayor
- 1987: Javier Sotomayor
- 1988: Javier Sotomayor
- 1989: Javier Sotomayor
- 1990: Lázaro Chacón
- 1991: Javier Sotomayor
- 1992: Javier Sotomayor
- 1993: Javier Sotomayor
- 1994: Javier Sotomayor
- 1995: Javier Sotomayor
- 1996: Andrés Leal
- 1997: Andrés Leal
- 1998: Javier Sotomayor
- 1999: Javier Sotomayor
- 2000: Lázaro Suárez
- 2001: Javier Sotomayor
- 2002: Yordán Lugones
- 2003: Dailen Ortega
- 2004: Yunier Carrillo
- 2005: Lisvany Pérez
- 2006: Víctor Moya

=== Pole vault ===
- 1986: Rubén Camino
- 1987: Rubén Camino
- 1988: Ángel García
- 1989: Rubén Camino
- 1990: Ángel García
- 1991: Ángel García
- 1992: Alberto Manzano
- 1993: Alberto Manzano
- 1994: Alberto Manzano
- 1995: Alberto Manzano
- 1996: Alberto Manzano
- 1997: Alberto Manzano
- 1998: Ricardo Diez (VEN)
- 1999: Ángel García
- 2000: Amaury Fernández
- 2001: Amaury Fernández
- 2002: Frank Céspedes
- 2003: Frank Céspedes
- 2004: Frank Céspedes
- 2005: Lázaro Borges
- 2006: Lázaro Borges

=== Long jump ===
- 1986: Jaime Jefferson
- 1987: Juan Ortiz
- 1988: Jaime Jefferson
- 1989: Jaime Jefferson
- 1990: Jaime Jefferson
- 1991: Jaime Jefferson
- 1992: Iván Pedroso
- 1993: Iván Pedroso
- 1994: Jaime Jefferson
- 1995: Iván Pedroso
- 1996: Jaime Jefferson
- 1997: Iván Pedroso
- 1998: Iván Pedroso
- 1999: Joan Lino Martínez
- 2000: Iván Pedroso
- 2001: Yoelmis Pacheco
- 2002: Ibrahim Camejo
- 2003: Yoelmis Pacheco
- 2004: Yoelmis Pacheco
- 2005: Iván Pedroso
- 2006: Ibrahim Camejo

=== Triple jump ===
- 1986: Lázaro Betancourt
- 1987: Jorge Reyna
- 1988: Juan Miguel López
- 1989: Juan Miguel López
- 1990: Lázaro Betancourt
- 1991: Yoelbi Quesada
- 1992: Yoelbi Quesada
- 1993: Yoelbi Quesada
- 1994: Yoelbi Quesada
- 1995: Yoelbi Quesada
- 1996: Aliecer Urrutia
- 1997: Yoelbi Quesada
- 1998: Yoelbi Quesada
- 1999: Yoel García
- 2000: Michael Calvo
- 2001: Michael Calvo
- 2002: Yoandri Betanzos
- 2003: Yoandri Betanzos
- 2004: Yoandri Betanzos
- 2005: Yoandri Betanzos
- 2006: Yoandri Betanzos

=== Shot put ===
- 1986: Paul Ruiz
- 1987: Paul Ruiz
- 1988: Paul Ruiz
- 1989: Paul Ruiz
- 1990: Paul Ruiz
- 1991: Jorge Montenegro
- 1992: Jorge Montenegro
- 1993: Jorge Montenegro
- 1994: Carlos Fandiño
- 1995: Carlos Fandiño
- 1996: Yosvany Obregón
- 1997: Carlos Fandiño
- 1998: Carlos Fandiño
- 1999: Alexis Paumier
- 2000: Alexis Paumier
- 2001: Jhonny Rodríguez (COL)
- 2002: Alexis Paumier
- 2003: Alexis Paumier
- 2004: Alexis Paumier
- 2005: Alexis Paumier
- 2006: Yoisel Toledo

=== Discus throw ===
- 1986: Raúl Calderón
- 1987: Luis Delís
- 1988: Juan Martínez Brito
- 1989: Roberto Moya
- 1990: Juan Martínez Brito
- 1991: Juan Martínez Brito
- 1992: Roberto Moya
- 1993: Roberto Moya
- 1994: Roberto Moya
- 1995: Roberto Moya
- 1996: Alexis Elizalde
- 1997: Alexis Elizalde
- 1998: Alexis Elizalde
- 1999: Alexis Elizalde
- 2000: Alexis Elizalde
- 2001: Alexis Elizalde
- 2002: Lois Maikel Martínez
- 2003: Frank Casañas
- 2004: Frank Casañas
- 2005: Frank Casañas
- 2006: Lois Maikel Martínez

=== Hammer throw ===
- 1986: Vicente Sánchez
- 1987: Francisco Soria
- 1988: Eladio Hernández
- 1989: Eladio Hernández
- 1990: René Díaz
- 1991: René Díaz
- 1992: Eladio Hernández
- 1993: Alberto Sánchez
- 1994: Alberto Sánchez
- 1995: Alberto Sánchez
- 1996: Alberto Sánchez
- 1997: Alberto Sánchez
- 1998: Alberto Sánchez
- 1999: Yosvany Suárez
- 2000: Yosmel Montes
- 2001: Yosmel Montes
- 2002: Yosvany Suárez
- 2003: Yosvany Suárez
- 2004: Yosmel Montes
- 2005: Erik Jiménez
- 2006: Noleysi Bicet

=== Javelin throw ===
- 1986: Ramón González
- 1987: Martín Álvarez
- 1988: Ramón González
- 1989: Ramón González
- 1990: Ramón González
- 1991: Ramón González
- 1992: Héctor Duharte
- 1993: Ovidio Trimino
- 1994: Emeterio González
- 1995: Emeterio González
- 1996: Emeterio González
- 1997: Emeterio González
- 1998: Emeterio González
- 1999: Emeterio González
- 2000: Emeterio González
- 2001: Emeterio González
- 2002: Emeterio González
- 2003: Isbel Luaces
- 2004: Guillermo Martínez
- 2005: Guillermo Martínez
- 2006: Guillermo Martínez

=== Decathlon ===
- 1986: Ernesto Betancourt
- 1987: Miguel Valle
- 1988: Luis Milanes
- 1989: ?
- 1990: Luis Milanes
- 1991: Eugenio Balanqué
- 1992: Ernesto Betancourt
- 1993: Eugenio Balanqué
- 1994: Eugenio Balanqué
- 1995: Raúl Duany
- 1996: Raúl Duany
- 1997: Jorge Moreno
- 1998: Yonelvis Águila
- 1999: Yonelvis Águila
- 2000: Raúl Duany
- 2001: Yonelvis Águila
- 2002: Yonelvis Águila
- 2003: Yonelvis Águila
- 2004: Alberto Juantorena Jr.
- 2005: Alexis Chivás
- 2006: Yordanis García

=== 20 kilometres walk ===
The 1993 championship was held as a track event.

- 1986: Edel Oliva
- 1987: Juan Velázquez
- 1988: Daniel Vargas
- 1989: Edel Oliva
- 1990: Edel Oliva
- 1991: Daniel Vargas
- 1992: ?
- 1993: Daniel Vargas
- 1994: Ihosvany Díaz
- 1995: Daniel Vargas
- 1996: Daniel Vargas
- 1997: Francisco Gutiérrez
- 1998: Francisco Gutiérrez
- 1999: Jorge Luis Pino
- 2000: Francisco Gutiérrez
- 2001: Francisco Gutiérrez
- 2002: Jorge Luis Pino
- 2003: Jorge Luis Pino
- 2004: ?
- 2005: Loisel Gutiérrez
- 2006: Yubraile Hernández

=== 50 kilometres walk ===
- 1986: Edel Oliva
- 1987: Edel Oliva
- 1988: Edel Oliva
- 1989: Edel Oliva
- 1990: Edel Oliva
- 1991: Daniel Vargas
- 1992: ?
- 1993: ?
- 1994: Edel Oliva
- 1995: Ricardo Risquet
- 1996: Jorge Luis Pino
- 1997: Jorge Luis Pino
- 1998: Jorge Luis Pino
- 1999: Ihosvany Díaz

== Women ==
=== 100 metres ===
- 1986: Idania Pino
- 1987: Miriam Ferrer
- 1988: Liliana Allen
- 1989: Liliana Allen
- 1990: Liliana Allen
- 1991: Liliana Allen
- 1992: Liliana Allen
- 1993: Liliana Allen
- 1994: Liliana Allen
- 1995: Liliana Allen
- 1996: Idalia Hechevarría
- 1997: Virgen Benavides
- 1998: Virgen Benavides
- 1999: Virgen Benavides
- 2000: Ana López
- 2001: Virgen Benavides
- 2002: Roxana Díaz
- 2003: Roxana Díaz
- 2004: Misleidis Lazo
- 2005: Virgen Benavides
- 2006: Roxana Díaz

=== 200 metres ===
- 1986: Ester Petitón
- 1987: Susana Armenteros
- 1988: Liliana Allen
- 1989: Eusebia Riquelme
- 1990: Liliana Allen
- 1991: Liliana Allen
- 1992: Liliana Allen
- 1993: Liliana Allen
- 1994: Liliana Allen
- 1995: Liliana Allen
- 1996: Daimí Pernía
- 1997: Idalmis Bonne
- 1998: Virgen Benavides
- 1999: Virgen Benavides
- 2000: Roxana Díaz
- 2001: Ana López
- 2002: Roxana Díaz
- 2003: Roxana Díaz
- 2004: Roxana Díaz
- 2005: Roxana Díaz
- 2006: Roxana Díaz

=== 400 metres ===
- 1986: Migdalia Peña
- 1987: Tania Fernández
- 1988: Ana Fidelia Quirot
- 1989: Ana Fidelia Quirot
- 1990: Zoilda Guilbert
- 1991: Ana Fidelia Quirot
- 1992: Nancy McLeón
- 1993: Nancy McLeón
- 1994: Julia Duporty
- 1995: Julia Duporty
- 1996: Ana Fidelia Quirot
- 1997: Julia Duporty
- 1998: Julia Duporty
- 1999: Zulia Calatayud
- 2000: Julia Duporty
- 2001: Yudalis Díaz
- 2002: Ana Peña
- 2003: Lisvania Grenot
- 2004: Lisvania Grenot
- 2005: Lisvania Grenot
- 2006: Aymée Martínez

=== 800 metres ===
- 1986: Idalmis López
- 1987: Mercedes Álvarez
- 1988: Maura Savón
- 1989: Ana Fidelia Quirot
- 1990: Maura Savón
- 1991: Ana Fidelia Quirot
- 1992: Ana Fidelia Quirot
- 1993: Nancy McLeón
- 1994: Odalmis Limonta
- 1995: Ana Fidelia Quirot
- 1996: Ana Fidelia Quirot
- 1997: Ana Fidelia Quirot
- 1998: Ana Fidelia Quirot
- 1999: Zulia Calatayud
- 2000: Zulia Calatayud
- 2001: Zulia Calatayud
- 2002: Adriana Muñoz
- 2003: Adriana Muñoz
- 2004: Yanelis Lara
- 2005: Adriana Muñoz
- 2006: Yusneysi Santiusti

=== 1500 metres ===
- 1986: Eloína Kerr
- 1987: Milagro Rodríguez
- 1988: Milagro Rodríguez
- 1989: Milagro Rodríguez
- 1990: Milagro Rodríguez
- 1991: Milagro Rodríguez
- 1992: Maura Savón
- 1993: María Contreras
- 1994: Liudmila Dubois
- 1995: Liudmila Dubois
- 1996: Yesenia Centeno
- 1997: Ana Fidelia Quirot
- 1998: Ana Fidelia Quirot
- 1999: Niuvis Gonzalez Rodriguez
- 2000: Yoenny Mayacen
- 2001: Yanelis Lara
- 2002: Adriana Muñoz
- 2003: Adriana Muñoz
- 2004: Adriana Muñoz
- 2005: Adriana Muñoz
- 2006: Yusneysi Santiusti

=== 3000 metres ===
- 1986: Sergia Martínez
- 1987: ?
- 1988: Milagro Rodríguez
- 1989: ?
- 1990: Milagro Rodríguez
- 1991: Milagro Rodríguez
- 1992: Milagro Rodríguez
- 1993: Milagro Rodríguez
- 1994: Yesenia Centeno

=== 5000 metres ===
- 1986: Maribel Durruty
- 1987: Maribel Durruty
- 1988: Milagro Rodríguez
- 1989: Not held
- 1990: Not held
- 1991: Not held
- 1992: Not held
- 1993: Not held
- 1994: Natalia Aróstica
- 1995: Mariela González
- 1996: Milagro Rodríguez
- 1997: Yailén García
- 1998: Mariela González
- 1999: Mariela González
- 2000: Yudelkis Martínez
- 2001: Mariela González
- 2002: Yudelkis Martínez
- 2003: Yudelkis Martínez
- 2004: Yudelkis Martínez
- 2005: Yanisleidis Castillo
- 2006: Yusneysi Santiusti

=== 10,000 metres ===
- 1986: Lucia Conde
- 1987: Maribel Durruty
- 1988: Maribel Durruty
- 1989: Adelaida Iglesias
- 1990: Maribel Durruty
- 1991: Natalia Aróstica
- 1992: Emperatriz Wilson
- 1993: Milagro Rodríguez
- 1994: Yesenia Centeno
- 1995: Emperatriz Wilson
- 1996: Mariela González
- 1997: Milagro Rodríguez
- 1998: Nurian Sáez
- 1999: Mariela González
- 2000: Mariela González
- 2001: Yudelkis Martínez
- 2002: Mariela González
- 2003: Yudelkis Martínez
- 2004: ?
- 2005: Mariela González
- 2006: Yaremis Torres

=== Marathon ===
- 1987: Emperatriz Wilson
- 1988: Emperatriz Wilson
- 1989: Maribel Durruty
- 1990: Emperatriz Wilson
- 1991: Emperatriz Wilson
- 1992: ?
- 1993: ?
- 1994: ?
- 1995: Fidelina Limonta
- 1996: ?
- 1997: Maribel Durruty
- 1998: Maribel Durruty
- 1999: Sergia Martínez
- 2000: ?
- 2001: ?
- 2002: ?
- 2003: Emperatriz Wilson
- 2004: Mariela González
- 2005: ?
- 2006: ?

=== 2000 metres steeplechase ===
- 1997: Liudmila Dubois
- 1998: ?
- 1999: Lismeidys Rolando

=== 100 metres hurdles ===
- 1986: Aliuska López
- 1987: Aliuska López
- 1988: Aliuska López
- 1989: Aliuska López
- 1990: Odalys Adams
- 1991: Odalys Adams
- 1992: Odalys Adams
- 1993: Aliuska López
- 1994: Aliuska López
- 1995: Aliuska López
- 1996: Aliuska López
- 1997: Aliuska López
- 1998: Dainelky Pérez
- 1999: Aliuska López
- 2000: Aliuska López
- 2001: Brigitte Foster-Hylton (JAM)
- 2002: Anay Tejeda
- 2003: Anay Tejeda
- 2004: Anay Tejeda
- 2005: Anay Tejeda
- 2006: Yahumara Neira

=== 400 metres hurdles ===
- 1986: Odalys Hernández
- 1987: Tania Fernández
- 1988: Tania Fernández
- 1989: Elsa Jiménez
- 1990: Elsa Jiménez
- 1991: Tania Fernández
- 1992: Lency Montelier
- 1993: Elsa Jiménez
- 1994: Lency Montelier
- 1995: Lency Montelier
- 1996: Odalys Hernández
- 1997: Daimí Pernía
- 1998: Lency Montelier
- 1999: Daimí Pernía
- 2000: Yasnay Lescay
- 2001: Daimí Pernía
- 2002: Yudalis Díaz
- 2003: Dayaní Lara
- 2004: Yaniuska Pérez
- 2005: Yaniuska Pérez
- 2006: Daimí Pernía

=== High jump ===
- 1986: Silvia Costa
- 1987: Silvia Costa
- 1988: Silvia Costa
- 1989: Dania Fernández
- 1990: Ioamnet Quintero
- 1991: Ioamnet Quintero
- 1992: Ioamnet Quintero
- 1993: Ioamnet Quintero
- 1994: Silvia Costa
- 1995: Ioamnet Quintero
- 1996: Ioamnet Quintero
- 1997: Niurka Lussón
- 1998: Romary Rifka (MEX)
- 1999: Romary Rifka (MEX)
- 2000: Ioamnet Quintero
- 2001: Ioamnet Quintero
- 2002: Yanisleidi Fernández
- 2003: Yarianny Argüelles
- 2004: Yarianny Argüelles
- 2005: Yarianny Argüelles
- 2006: Yarianny Argüelles

=== Pole vault ===
- 1997: Kenia Sánchez
- 1998: Mariana McCarthy
- 1999: Mariana McCarthy
- 2000: Katiuska Pérez
- 2001: Mariana McCarthy
- 2002: Katiuska Pérez
- 2003: Katiuska Pérez
- 2004: Yarisley Silva
- 2005: Katiuska Pérez
- 2006: Yarisley Silva

=== Long jump ===
- 1986: Adelina Polledo
- 1987: Eloína Echevarría
- 1988: Niurka Montalvo
- 1989: Eloína Echevarría
- 1990: Niurka Montalvo
- 1991: Virginia Martínez
- 1992: Eloína Echevarría
- 1993: Niurka Montalvo
- 1994: Niurka Montalvo
- 1995: Niurka Montalvo
- 1996: Lissette Cuza
- 1997: Olga Cepero
- 1998: Yamilé Paumier
- 1999: Lissette Cuza
- 2000: Lissette Cuza
- 2001: Lissette Cuza
- 2002: Lissette Cuza
- 2003: Yudelkis Fernández
- 2004: Yargelis Savigne
- 2005: Yudelkis Fernández
- 2006: Yargelis Savigne

=== Triple jump ===
- 1992: Eloína Echevarría
- 1993: Niurka Montalvo
- 1994: Niurka Montalvo
- 1995: Olga Cepero
- 1996: Olga Cepero
- 1997: Yamilé Aldama
- 1998: Yamilé Aldama
- 1999: Yamilé Aldama
- 2000: Yamilé Aldama
- 2001: Yusmay Bicet
- 2002: Olga Cepero
- 2003: Mabel Gay
- 2004: Mabel Gay
- 2005: Yusmay Bicet
- 2006: Mabel Gay

=== Shot put ===
- 1986: Marcelina Rodríguez
- 1987: Belsy Laza
- 1988: Belsy Laza
- 1989: Belsy Laza
- 1990: Belsy Laza
- 1991: Belsy Laza
- 1992: Belsy Laza
- 1993: Belsy Laza
- 1994: Yumileidi Cumbá
- 1995: Yumileidi Cumbá
- 1996: Belsy Laza
- 1997: Herminia Fernández
- 1998: Yumileidi Cumbá
- 1999: Belsy Laza
- 2000: Yumileidi Cumbá
- 2001: Yumileidi Cumbá
- 2002: Yumileidi Cumbá
- 2003: Yumileidi Cumbá
- 2004: Yumileidi Cumbá
- 2005: Yumileidi Cumbá
- 2006: Yumileidi Cumbá

=== Discus throw ===
- 1986: Maritza Martén
- 1987: Maritza Martén
- 1988: Hilda Ramos
- 1989: Maritza Martén
- 1990: Maritza Martén
- 1991: Bárbara Hechavarría
- 1992: Hilda Ramos
- 1993: Maritza Martén
- 1994: Bárbara Hechavarría
- 1995: Maritza Martén
- 1996: Bárbara Hechavarría
- 1997: Maritza Martén
- 1998: Bárbara Hechavarría
- 1999: Ana Elys Fernández
- 2000: Yania Ferrales
- 2001: Yania Ferrales
- 2002: Yuneidis Bonne
- 2003: Anaelys Fernández
- 2004: Yania Ferrales
- 2005: Yania Ferrales
- 2006: Yania Ferrales

=== Hammer throw ===
- 1995: Norbi Balantén
- 1996: Norbi Balantén
- 1997: Norbi Balantén
- 1998: Norbi Balantén
- 1999: Yipsi Moreno
- 2000: Yipsi Moreno
- 2001: Yipsi Moreno
- 2002: Yipsi Moreno
- 2003: Yipsi Moreno
- 2004: Yipsi Moreno
- 2005: Yunaika Crawford
- 2006: Yunaika Crawford

=== Javelin throw ===
- 1986: María Caridad Colón
- 1987: María Caridad Colón
- 1988: Ivonne Leal
- 1989: Dulce García
- 1990: Isel López
- 1991: Dulce García
- 1992: Isel López
- 1993: Dulce García
- 1994: Xiomara Rivero
- 1995: Sonia Bisset
- 1996: Isel López
- 1997: Osleidys Menéndez
- 1998: Sonia Bisset
- 1999: Osleidys Menéndez
- 2000: Osleidys Menéndez
- 2001: Osleidys Menéndez
- 2002: Osleidys Menéndez
- 2003: Osleidys Menéndez
- 2004: Osleidys Menéndez
- 2005: Osleidys Menéndez
- 2006: Osleidys Menéndez

=== Heptathlon ===
- 1986: Caridad Balcindes
- 1987: Victoria Despaigne
- 1988: Yolaida Pompa
- 1989: ?
- 1990: Magalys García
- 1991: Laiza Carrillo
- 1992: Yolaida Pompa
- 1993: ?
- 1994: Magalys García
- 1995: Magalys García
- 1996: Magalys García
- 1997: Miroslava Ibarra
- 1998: Regla Cárdenas
- 1999: Regla Cárdenas
- 2000: Magalys García
- 2001: Osiris Pedroso
- 2002: Magalys García
- 2003: Magalys García
- 2004: Yuleidis Limonta
- 2005: Yasmiany Pedroso
- 2006: Grechel Quintana

=== 5000 metres walk ===
The 1988 and 1991 championships were held as road events.

- 1988: Margarita Morales
- 1989: Margarita Morales
- 1990: Yoslaine Puñales
- 1991: Yoslaine Puñales
- 1992: ?
- 1993: ?
- 1994: ?
- 1995: Oslaidis Cruz
- 1996: Oslaidis Cruz
- 1997: Oslaidis Cruz

=== 10 kilometres walk ===
The 1987, 1989 and 1993 championships were held as track events.

- 1987: Margarita Morales
- 1988: Margarita Morales
- 1989: Margarita Morales
- 1990: Yoslaine Puñales
- 1991: Yoslaine Puñales
- 1992: ?
- 1993: Maribel Calderín
- 1994: Oslaidis Cruz
- 1995: Oslaidis Cruz
- 1996: Oslaidis Cruz
- 1997: Marisleidis Martínez
- 1998: Oslaidis Cruz
- 1999: Oslaidis Cruz

=== 20 kilometres walk ===
- 1999: Oslaidis Cruz
- 2000: Yarelis Sánchez
- 2001: Oslaidis Cruz
- 2002: Yarelis Sánchez
- 2003: Yaimara Pérez
- 2004: Yarelis Sánchez
- 2005: Yarelis Sánchez
- 2006: Yarelis Sánchez
