= Marabana =

- Date: Third Sunday in November
- Location: Havana
- Event type: road
- Distance: Marathon, Half marathon, 15k, 10k and 5k
- Primary sponsor: Adidas
- Established: 1987
- Course records: Men Marathon: 2:13:37 (1994); Alberto Cuba; Women Marathon: 2.43:40 (2001); Emperatriz Wilson; Men Half-Marathon: 1.03:40 (2005); Aguelmis Rojas; Women Half-Marathon: 1.14:56 (2001); Mariela González
- Website: https://maratondelahabana.com/

Runners passing by 26th avenue / Marabana 2006

Marabana is the name of the most popular marathon in Cuba. Since 1987 the Marabana has been held in Havana, Cuba, during the month of November (third Sunday of November). It contains both a half marathon and a marathon in a circuit around the most central avenues in Havana, starting and finishing in Old Havana. Both circuits are certified by the AIMS/IASF. The half marathon is 21 km and 97.50 m, while the marathon is 42 km and 195 m.

== Technical specifications ==
Some specifications of the marathon are the following:

Course of the Half Marathon. The sense is counter-clockwise. Larger version of the map here File:Marabana Marathon Course Map.png

Three different races are held:

- Marathon: 42,195 meters
- Half marathon: 21,097.50 meters
- Mini-marathon por la paz: 4,219 meters

Limit Time:

- Marathon 5 hours
- Half marathon 3 hours

Histogram of the half marathon speeds in Marabana 2012. Computed out of the official speeds reports.

Supply stations are found every 2 kilometers and first aid stations are found every 3 kilometers.

Histogram of the speeds in the 10 km race in Marabana 2012. Computed out of the official speeds reports.

=== Records ===
Marathon

- Men - 2:13:37
- Women - 2.43:40

Half marathon:

- Men - 1.03:40
- Women - 1.14:56

Subscription Fee

- 50 Cuban Convertible Pesos (Approx. 50 USD)

== Half marathon winners ==
Year	Male	Female
1987	Alexis Cuba	Emperatriz Wilson
1988	Alberto Cuba	Isabel Arias
1989	Alberto Cuba	Emperatriz Wilson
1990	Ángel Rodríguez	Emperatriz Wilson
1991	Diosdado Matos	Natalia Aróstica
1992	Alberto Cuba	Emperatriz Wilson
1993	Ángel Rodríguez	Emperatriz Wilson
1994	Luis Cadet	Yesenia Centeno
1995	Alexis Cuba	Emperatriz Wilson
1996	Alberto Cuba	Yesenia Centeno
1997	Ángel Rodríguez	Mariela González
1998	Luis Cadet	Mariela González
1999	Hirán Trutié	Mariela González
2000	Aguelmis Rojas	Mariela González
2001	Aguelmis Rojas	Mariela González (CR 1.14:56hrs)
2002	Aguelmis Rojas	Mariela González
2003	Aguelmis Rojas	Mariela González
2004	Norbert Gutiérrez	Yailén García
2005	Aguelmis Rojas (CR 1.03:40hrs)	Mariela González
2006	Norbert Gutiérrez	Mariela González
2007	Aquelmis Rojas	Dailin Belmontes
2008	Norbert Y. Gutiérrez	Yarisleydis Fuentes
2009	Henry Jaen (CR 1.06:16hrs)	Dailin Belmonte (CR 1.18:07hrs)

== Marathon winners ==
Year	Male	Female
1990	José Ramón Rodríguez	Niurka Cuesta
1991	José Ramón Rodríguez	Isabel Arias
1992	Alejandro Salvador (MEX)	Natalia Aróstica
1993	Marcelino López (MEX)	Anna Sacchi (ITA)
1994	Alberto Cuba (CR 2.13:37hrs)	Yesenia Centeno
1995	José Ramón Rodríguez	Fidelina Limonta
1996	Ángel Ferreiro	Sergia Martínez
1997	Freddy López	Adelina Limonta
1998	Alexis Cuba	Yesenia Centeno
1999	Nelson Cabral	Emperatriz Wilson
2000	Luis Cadet	Emperatriz Wilson
2001	Alberto Cuba	Emperatriz Wilson (CR 2.43:40hrs)
2002	Ángel Ferreiro	Zenaida Alonso
2003	Yosbel Arboláez	Emperatriz Wilson
2004	Hirán Trutie	Emperatriz Wilson
2005	Isbel Milián	Aracelys Lamothe
2006	Henry Jaén	Aracelys Lamothe
2007	Henry Jaén (CR 2.29:23hrs)	Mariela Gonzalez (CR 2.51:182hrs)
2008	Aquelmis Rojas (CR 2.20:56hrs)	Daylin Belmonte (CR 2.52:45hrs)
2009	Jorge Suarez (CR 2.27:42hrs)	Liuris M. Figueredo (CR 3.03:23hrs)
2011	Alexei Machado (2:28.04)	Yadira Gonzalez (3:14.40)

== See also ==
Marathon articles

- Marathon
- Half marathon
- List of marathon races in North America
- Marathon world record progression
- Ultramarathon

Cuban runners

- Alberto Cuba
- Emperatriz Wilson
- Aguelmis Rojas
- Mariela González
