= 1993 Central American and Caribbean Championships in Athletics =

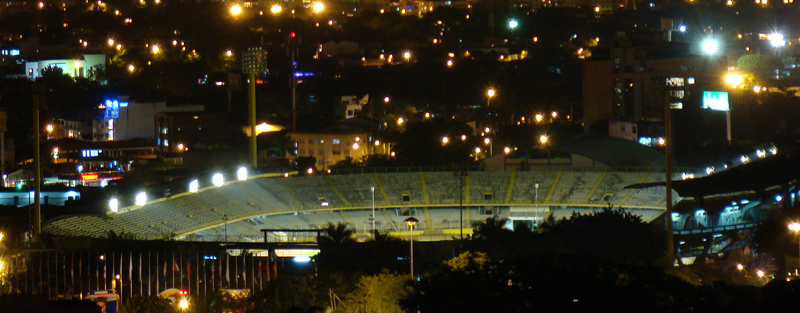
- Host venue in Cali.
- Dates: 30 July–1 August
- Host city: Cali, Colombia
- Venue: Estadio Pascual Guerrero

The 1993 Central American and Caribbean Championships in Athletics were held at the Estadio Pascual Guerrero in Cali, Colombia between 30 July − 1 August.

== Medal summary ==
=== Men's events ===
Event	Gold		Silver		Bronze	
100 metres (wind: +2.1 m/s)	Obadele Thompson; Barbados	10.30w	Leonardo Prevost; Cuba	10.34w	Kirk Cummins; Barbados	10.37w
200 metres (wind: +4.1 m/s)	Andrew Tynes; Bahamas	20.50w	Edgardo Guilbe; Puerto Rico	20.86w	Neil de Silva; Trinidad and Tobago	20.90w
400 metres	Greg Haughton; Jamaica	45.35	Dennis Blake; Jamaica	46.05	Norberto Téllez; Cuba	46.25
800 metres	Alain Miranda; Cuba	1:47.29	Mario Watson; Jamaica	1:47.79	Luis Toledo; Mexico	1:48.28
1500 metres	Ricardo Herrera; Mexico	3:47.60	Gilberto Merchant; Mexico	3:47.60	Linton McKenzie; Jamaica	3:48.00
5000 metres	Herder Vásquez; Colombia	14:09.30	Narciso Florez; Mexico	14:21.60	Salvador Parra; Mexico	14:23.90
10,000 metres	Herder Vásquez; Colombia	29:10.80 CR	Dionicio Cerón; Mexico	29:12.80	Gabino Apolonio; Mexico	29:26.80
Half marathon	Marcelino Cristano; Mexico	1:02:11 CR	Alberto Cuba; Cuba	1:03:10	Julio Hernández; Colombia	1:04:03
110 metres hurdles (wind: +2.7 m/s)	Erik Batte; Cuba	13.84w	Mickey Soto; Puerto Rico	13.94w	Matthew Love; Jamaica	14.12w
400 metres hurdles	José Pérez; Cuba	50.00	Pedro Piñera; Cuba	50.04	Domingo Cordero; Puerto Rico	50.45
3000 metres steeplechase	Gustavo Castillo; Mexico	8:49.96	Juan Ramón Conde; Cuba	8:53.98	Héctor Arias; Mexico	8:55.10
4 × 100 metres relay	Bahamas; Andrew Tynes; Bernard Young; Renward Wells; Sylvanus Hepburn	39.33	Jamaica; Jason Shelton; John Mair; Bernard Burrell; Windell Dobson	39.67	Cuba; Erik Batte; Leonardo Prevost; Alfredo García-Baró; Juan Felipe Ortiz	39.72
4 × 400 metres relay	Jamaica; Mitchell Francis; Greg Haughton; Dennis Blake; Danny McFarlane	3:02.57 CR	Cuba; Norberto Téllez; Lázaro Martínez; Héctor Herrera; Omar Mena	3:02.58	Colombia; Wilson Cañizales; Llimy Rivas; Robinson Urrutia; Nicolás Valencia	3:06.39
20 km road walk	Héctor Moreno; Colombia	1:24:31 CR	Querubín Moreno; Colombia	1:27:31	Iván Aricardo; Mexico	1:31:48
High jump	Gilmar Mayo; Colombia	2.15	José Escalera; Puerto Rico	2.10	Karl Scatliffe; British Virgin Islands	2.10
Pole vault	Ángel García; Cuba	5.60 CR	Alberto Manzano; Cuba	5.40	Konstantín Zagustín; Venezuela	4.80
Long jump	Elmer Williams; Puerto Rico	7.96	Juan Garzón; Cuba	7.91	Juan Felipe Ortiz; Cuba	7.78
Triple jump	Sergio Saavedra; Venezuela	16.49	Aliecer Urrutia; Cuba	16.35	José Escalera; Puerto Rico	15.63
Shot put	Carlos Fandiño; Cuba	19.04	Francisco Ball; Puerto Rico	18.33	Jorge Montenegro; Cuba	17.14
Discus throw	Frank Bicet; Cuba	55.26	Alfredo Romero; Puerto Rico	50.82	Howard Brown; Jamaica	50.76
Hammer throw	Alberto Sánchez; Cuba	74.98 CR	Guillermo Guzmán; Mexico	69.96	Eladio Hernández; Cuba	69.60
Javelin throw	Luis Lucumí; Colombia	73.54	Héctor Duharte; Cuba	72.94	Emeterio González; Cuba	71.18
Decathlon	Raúl Duany; Cuba	7749 CR	Eugenio Balanqué; Cuba	7213	Jorge Camacho; Mexico	6890

=== Women's events ===
Event	Gold		Silver		Bronze	
100 metres (wind: +2.3 m/s)	Miriam Ferrer; Cuba	11.42w	Cheryl-Ann Phillips; Jamaica	11.50w	Kerry-Ann Richards; Jamaica	11.59w
200 metres (wind: +6.2 m/s)	Idalmis Bonne; Cuba	23.22w	Debbie Ferguson; Bahamas	23.32w	Esther Duporty; Cuba	23.35w
400 metres	Norfalia Carabalí; Colombia	51.33	Odalmis Limonta; Cuba	52.18	Inez Turner; Jamaica	52.64
800 metres	Inez Turner; Jamaica	2:07.48	Jennifer Fisher; Bermuda	2:09.12	Martha Gómez; Colombia	2:10.46
1500 metres	Isabel Juárez; Mexico	4:23.94	Adriana Fernández; Mexico	4:27.16	Elsa Monterroso; Guatemala	4:34.59
3000 metres	Isabel Juárez; Mexico	9:29.82	Adriana Fernández; Mexico	9:34.73	Elsa Monterroso; Guatemala	10:09.18
10,000 metres	Stella Castro; Colombia	34:20.60 CR	María Carreño; Mexico	36:33.50	Lucía Mendiola; Mexico	36:37.70
Half marathon	Stella Castro; Colombia	1:12:07 CR	Paola Cabrera; Mexico	1:16:41	Emperatriz Wilson; Cuba	1:17:42
100 metres hurdles (wind: +1.7 m/s)	Joyce Meléndez; Puerto Rico	13.24	Carolyn Sterling; Jamaica	13.26	Damaris Anderson; Cuba	13.38
400 metres hurdles	Debbie-Ann Parris; Jamaica	57.10 CR	Lency Montelier; Cuba	57.77	Alejandra Quintanar; Mexico	58.6
4 × 100 metres relay	Jamaica; Carolyn Sterling; Cheryl-Ann Phillips; Kerry-Ann Richards; Andria Lloyd	44.25 CR	Bahamas; Eldece Clarke-Lewis; Debbie Ferguson; Savatheda Fynes; Chandra Sturrup	44.28	Cuba; Idalmis Bonne; Julia Duporty; Miriam Ferrer; Surella Morales	44.64
4 × 400 metres relay	Jamaica; Debbie-Ann Parris; Beverley Grant; Claudine Williams; Inez Turner	3:27.36	Cuba; Idalmis Bonne; Julia Duporty; Odalmis Limonta; Lency Montelier	3:28.95	Colombia; Norfalia Carabalí; Elia Mera; Maribelcy Peña; Martha Gómez	3:34.29
10,000 m track walk	Eloísa Pérez; Mexico	47:29.6 CR	Liliana Bermeo; Colombia	47:41.1	Rosario Sánchez; Mexico	48:43.9
High jump	Gloria Lagoyete; Colombia	1.71				
Long jump	Niurka Montalvo; Cuba	6.58	Eloína Echevarría; Cuba	6.28	Carolyn Sterling; Jamaica	6.17
Triple jump	Niurka Montalvo; Cuba	14.09 CR	Eloína Echevarría; Cuba	13.63	Suzette Lee; Jamaica	12.78
Shot put	Herminia Fernández; Cuba	17.33	Yumileidi Cumbá; Cuba	17.24	María Isabel Urrutia; Colombia	15.25
Discus throw	Marlén Sánchez; Cuba	54.58	María Isabel Urrutia; Colombia	53.30	Maricela Brestet; Cuba	52.72
Javelin throw	Isel López; Cuba	58.68	Terry-Lynn Paynter; Bermuda	49.08	Verónica Prieto; Colombia	47.50
Heptathlon	Magalys García; Cuba	5884 CR	Regla Cárdenas; Cuba	5840	Zorobabelia Córdoba; Colombia	5251

== Medal table ==
* Host nation (Colombia)

Rank	Nation	Gold	Silver	Bronze	Total
1	Cuba	16	17	11	44
2	Colombia*	9	3	7	19
3	Mexico	6	8	9	23
4	Jamaica	6	5	7	18
5	Puerto Rico	2	5	2	9
6	Bahamas	2	2	0	4
7	Barbados	1	0	1	2
7	Venezuela	1	0	1	2
9	Bermuda	0	2	0	2
10	Guatemala	0	0	2	2
11	British Virgin Islands	0	0	1	1
11	Trinidad and Tobago	0	0	1	1
Totals (12 entries)		43	42	42	127

== See also ==
- 1993 in athletics (track and field)
