= 1995 Central American and Caribbean Championships in Athletics =

- Dates: 14–16 July
- Host city: Guatemala City, Guatemala
- Venue: Estadio La Pedrera

The 1995 Central American and Caribbean Championships in Athletics were held at the Estadio La Pedrera in Guatemala City, Guatemala between 14 and 16 July.

== Medal summary ==
=== Men's events ===
Event	Gold		Silver		Bronze	
100 metres (wind: -0.4 m/s)	Obadele Thompson; Barbados	10.18A	Joel Isasi; Cuba	10.29A	Jaime Barragán; Mexico	10.41A
200 metres (wind: 0.0 m/s)	Obadele Thompson; Barbados	20.49A CR	Percy Spencer; Jamaica	20.79A	Jorge Aguilera; Cuba	20.91A
400 metres	Eswort Coombs; Saint Vincent and the Grenadines	45.29A	Orville Taylor; Jamaica	45.37A	Jorge Crusellas; Cuba	45.65A
800 metres	Mario Watson; Jamaica	1:46.88A	Alex Morgan; Jamaica	1:47.52A	Alain Miranda; Cuba	1:47.72A
1500 metres	José López; Venezuela	3:50.5A	Amado Ramos; Cuba	3:51.8A	Héctor Torres; Mexico	3:52.2A
5000 metres	Sergio Jiménez; Mexico	14:32.68A	Miguel del Valle; Mexico	14:34.94A	Luis Cadet; Cuba	14:44.37A
10,000 metres	Marcos Villa; Mexico	29:44.16A	Víctor Rodríguez; Mexico	29:55.34A	José Morales; Guatemala	30:14.99A
Half marathon	José Luis Molina; Costa Rica	1:05:29A	Alberto Cuba; Cuba	1:06:13A	Marcos Villa; Mexico	1:06:46A
110 metres hurdles (wind: 0.0 m/s)	Erik Batte; Cuba	13.49A	Anier García; Cuba	13.71A	Matthew Love; Jamaica	13.94A
400 metres hurdles	José Pérez; Cuba	49.2A	Domingo Cordero; Puerto Rico	49.5A	Mitchell Francis; Jamaica	49.7A
3000 metres steeplechase	Rubén García; Mexico	8:52.91A	Romelio Bergolla; Cuba	9:15.89A	Gonzalo Vanegas; Colombia	9:17.41A
4 × 100 metres relay	Cuba	39.07A CR	Barbados; Obadele Thompson; Kirk Cummins; Achebe Hope; Wade Payne	39.49A NR	Colombia; Llimy Rivas; Robinson Urrutia; Luis Vega; John Mena	39.65A
4 × 400 metres relay	Jamaica	3:04.53A	Mexico; Arturo Espejel; Rymundo Escalante; Alberto Araujo; Juan Vallín	3:05.88A	Guyana; Winslow Hendriques; Roger Gill; Richard Jones; Orcen Newland	3:09.17A NR
20 km road walk	Jorge Segura; Mexico	1:25:08A	Julio Martínez; Guatemala	1:25:10A	Héctor Moreno; Colombia	1:25:40A
High jump	Marino Drake; Cuba	2.21A	Luis Soto; Puerto Rico	2.15A	Alberto Juantorena Jr. Cuba	2.12A
Pole vault	Ángel García; Cuba	5.40A	Alberto Manzano; Cuba	5.40A	Edgar Díaz; Puerto Rico	5.20A
Long jump	Elmer Williams; Puerto Rico	7.67A	Jérôme Romain; Dominica	7.66A	Ellsworth Manuel; Netherlands Antilles	7.65A
Triple jump	Jérôme Romain; Dominica	16.80A	Edward Manderson; Cayman Islands	16.09A NR	Osiris Mora; Cuba	16.04A
Shot put	Yojer Medina; Venezuela	18.46A	Yosvany Obregón; Cuba	17.66A	Orlando Ibarra; Colombia	16.62A
Discus throw	Frank Bicet; Cuba	57.70A	Alfredo Romero; Puerto Rico	52.54A	Orlando Ibarra; Colombia	47.24A
Hammer throw	Yosvany Suárez; Cuba	69.68A	Eladio Hernández; Cuba	67.62A	Guillermo Guzmán; Mexico	66.84A
Javelin throw	Isbel Luaces; Cuba	74.78A	Juan de la Garza; Mexico	74.74A	Ramón González; Cuba	73.30A
Decathlon	Eugenio Balanqué; Cuba	7719A	Yonelvis Águila; Cuba	7563A	Raúl Duany; Cuba	7174A

=== Women's events ===
Event	Gold		Silver		Bronze	
100 metres (wind: +0.4 m/s)	Heather Samuel; Antigua and Barbuda	11.31A	Eldece Clarke; Bahamas	11.35A	Vírgen Benavides; Cuba	11.59A
200 metres (wind: 0.0 m/s)	Nancy McLeón; Cuba	22.97A	Eldece Clarke; Bahamas	23.04A	Heather Samuel; Antigua and Barbuda	23.34A
400 metres	Idalmis Bonne; Cuba	50.95A	Revoli Campbell; Jamaica	51.55A	Surella Morales; Cuba	51.77A
800 metres	Ana Fidelia Quirot; Cuba	2:01.79A CR	Mardrea Hyman; Jamaica	2:08.23A	Delia Castro; Mexico	2:09.23A
1500 metres	Mardrea Hyman; Jamaica	4:31.74A	Adriana Fernández; Mexico	4:31.84A	Lilia Pichardo; Mexico	4:34.28A
5000 metres	Adriana Fernández; Mexico	16:34.3A CR	Lucía Mendiola; Mexico	16:39.7A	Iglandini González; Colombia	17:09.6A
10,000 metres	Lucía Rendón; Mexico	35:12.37A	Iglandini González; Colombia	35:45.82A	Kriscia García; El Salvador	37:52.26A
Half marathon	Emma Cabrera; Mexico	1:17:13A	Sonia Betancourt; Mexico	1:19:37A	Sergia Martínez; Cuba	1:20:41A
100 metres hurdles (wind: 0.0 m/s)	Oraidis Ramírez; Cuba	13.27A	Patrina Allen; Jamaica	13.44A	Joyce Meléndez; Puerto Rico	13.57A
400 metres hurdles	Lency Montelier; Cuba	56.9A CR	Odalys Hernández; Cuba	57.6A	Flor Robledo; Colombia	57.9A
4 × 100 metres relay	Cuba; Virgen Benavides; Idalmis Bonne; Idalia Hechavarría; Miriam Ferrer	44.41A	Jamaica; Peta-Gaye Reid; Tulia Robinson; Jennifer Powell; Maria Brown	45.27A	Puerto Rico; Xiomara Davila; Eileen Torres; Heysha Ortiz; Elaine Torres	45.28A
4 × 400 metres relay	Cuba; Nancy McLeon; Daimí Pernía; Idalmis Bonne; Julia Duporty	3:27.86A	Jamaica; Revoli Campbell; Claudine Williams; Beverley Grant; Donette Whyte	3:34.11A	Trinidad and Tobago; Ayanna Hutchinson; Gabriella Edwards; Angela Joseph; Melissa DeLeon	3:36.29A
10 km road walk	Francisca Martínez; Mexico	47:37A CR	Rosario Sánchez; Mexico	48:18A	Liliana Bermeo; Colombia	48:40A
High jump	María del Carmen García; Cuba	1.80A	Niurka Lussón; Cuba	1.75A	Romary Rifka; Mexico	1.75A
Long jump	Flora Hyacinth; U.S. Virgin Islands	6.59A	Miladys Portuondo; Cuba	6.26Aw	Lissete Cuza; Cuba	6.04A
Triple jump	Olga Cepero; Cuba	14.14A CR	Eloína Echevarría; Cuba	13.96A	Suzette Lee; Jamaica	13.67A
Shot put	Belsis Laza; Cuba	17.64A	Herminia Fernández; Cuba	17.17A	Touvia Boone; Saint Kitts and Nevis	13.12A
Discus throw	Olga Gómez; Cuba	55.02A	Maricela Brestet; Cuba	53.96A	Verónica Peña; Mexico	45.54A
Hammer throw †	Norbi Balantén; Cuba	52.68A (CR)	Lidia de la Cruz; Mexico	48.68A	Elizabeth Sánchez; Mexico	42.80A
Javelin throw	Sonia Bisset; Cuba	62.24A	María Caridad Álvarez; Cuba	60.32A	Zorobabelia Córdoba; Colombia	46.80A
Heptathlon	Magalys García; Cuba	6189A CR	Regla Cárdenas; Cuba	6052A	Zorobabelia Córdoba; Colombia	5151A

A = affected by altitude
† = non-championship event

== Medal table ==
* Host nation (Guatemala)

Rank	Nation	Gold	Silver	Bronze	Total
1	Cuba	23	17	12	52
2	Mexico	8	9	9	26
3	Jamaica	3	8	3	14
4	Barbados	2	1	0	3
5	Venezuela	2	0	0	2
6	Puerto Rico	1	3	3	7
7	Dominica	1	1	0	2
8	Netherlands Antilles	1	0	1	2
9	Costa Rica	1	0	0	1
9	Saint Vincent and the Grenadines	1	0	0	1
9	U.S. Virgin Islands	1	0	0	1
12	Bahamas	0	2	0	2
13	Colombia	0	1	10	11
14	Guatemala*	0	1	1	2
15	Cayman Islands	0	1	0	1
16	El Salvador	0	0	1	1
16	Guyana	0	0	1	1
16	Netherlands Antilles	0	0	1	1
16	Saint Kitts and Nevis	0	0	1	1
16	Trinidad and Tobago	0	0	1	1
Totals (20 entries)		44	44	44	132
