= Luis Bueno =

Cuban long jumper

Personal information
- Born: May 22, 1969 (age 57)
- Height: 1.74 m (5 ft 9 in)
- Weight: 67 kg (148 lb)
Medal record
Men's Athletics
Representing Cuba
World Junior Championships
Gold medal – first place	1988 Sudbury	Long Jump
CAC Junior Championships (U20)
Gold medal – first place	1986 Mexico City	Long jump
CAC Championships
Silver medal – second place	1989 San Juan	Long jump

Luis Alberto Bueno (born May 22, 1969) is a retired Cuban Track and Field athlete, known primarily for being a Junior long jumper.

== Career ==
He currently holds the World Best in the Youth Division, at 8.25 m set as a 17-year-old while winning the 1986 Ibero-American Championships September 28, 1986 in Havana. It made him the number 8 jumper in the world that year.

Two years later he improved his personal record to 8.28 m at age 19, which stands as the third best performer in the Junior Division, only behind 8.34 m by Randy Williams while winning the 1972 Summer Olympics and the 2012 improvement to 8.35 by Sergey Morgunov of Russia. His age 17 jump would also attain the same status, making it that much more exceptional. As a point of comparison, his 8.28 m was marginally better than Larry Myricks jumped to get the bronze medal at the 1988 Olympics two months later, but Cuba boycotted the Olympics in Seoul, South Korea that year. That year he also won the CAC Junior championships, and the 1988 World Junior Championships in Sudbury, Ontario, Canada.

As an open division athlete, he ranked #8 in world in 1990 but since then no elite results have been found. IAAF still lists his Junior best as his personal record.

== Achievements ==
Year	Competition	Venue	Position	Event	Notes
Representing Cuba
1986	Central American and Caribbean Junior Championships (U-20)	Mexico City, México	1st	Long jump	7.69 m A
1986	Ibero-American Championships	La Habana, Cuba	1st	Long jump	8.25 m (+1.9 m/s)
1988	World Junior Championships	Sudbury, Canada	1st	Long jump	7.99 m (-1.1 m/s)
1988	World Junior Championships	Sudbury, Canada	12th (h)	4 × 100 m relay	40.95
1991	Universiade	Sheffield, United Kingdom	14th (q)	Long jump	7.60 m
