= Emperatriz Wilson =

Cuban long-distance runner

Personal information
- Full name: Emperatriz Wilson Traba
- Born: January 25, 1966 (age 60)

Sport
- Country: Cuba
- Sport: Athletics
Medal record
Women's Athletics
Representing Cuba
Pan American Games
Bronze medal – third place	1991 Havana	Marathon
CAC Championships
Bronze medal – third place	1987 Caracas	10,000 metres
Bronze medal – third place	1993 Cali	Half Marathon
- Updated on 25 May 2013

Emperatriz Wilson Traba (born January 25, 1966) is a retired female long-distance runner from Cuba.

== Career ==
She represented her native country at the 1991 Pan American Games in Havana, Cuba, where she claimed the bronze medal in the women's marathon event behind Mexico's Olga Appell (gold) and compatriot Maribel Durruty (silver). Wilson set her personal best (2:36:35) in the marathon on December 13, 1992, in Caracas. In Cuba she is praised as one of the best female runners, winning several times the Marabana half marathon and marathon.

== Achievements ==
Year	Competition	Venue	Position	Event	Notes
Representing Cuba
1986	Ibero-American Championships	La Habana, Cuba	10th	3000m	10:36.03
1987	Central American and Caribbean Championships	Caracas, Venezuela	3rd	10,000 metres	37:07.20 min
1990	Central American and Caribbean Games	Mexico City, Mexico	5th	10,000 m	39:28.91 min
1990	Central American and Caribbean Games	Mexico City, Mexico	5th	Marathon	2:54:54 min
1991	Pan American Games	Havana, Cuba	6th	10,000 m	35:47.93 min
1991	Pan American Games	Havana, Cuba	3rd	Marathon	2:48:48 hrs
1993	Central American and Caribbean Championships	Cali, Colombia	3rd	Half marathon	1:17:42 hrs
1993	World Championships	Stuttgart, Germany	21st	Marathon	2:54:11 hrs
1993	Central American and Caribbean Games	Ponce, Puerto Rico	3rd	Marathon	2:54:41 hrs
2003	Pan American Games	Santo Domingo, Dominican Republic	8th	Marathon	2:54:16 hrs
2005	ALBA Games	La Habana, Cuba	3rd	Half marathon	1:31:45 hrs
