= Athletics at the 1991 Pan American Games – Men's decathlon =

Men's decathlon at the Pan American Games

The men's decathlon event at the 1991 Pan American Games was held in Havana, Cuba on 7 and 8 August. Pedro da Silva, of Brazil, won the Gold Medal in this event with a score of 7,762.

== Results ==
The highest mark recorded in each event is highlighted in yellow

Rank	Athlete	Nationality	100m	LJ	SP	HJ	400m	110m H	DT	PV	JT	1500m	Points	Notes
1st place, gold medalist(s)	Pedro da Silva	Brazil	11.36	7.03	15.02	2.03	51.99	14.87	44.02	5.00	60.66	5:03.06	7762	
2nd place, silver medalist(s)	Eugenio Balanqué	Cuba	11.00	7.05	13.59	2.12	48.09	14.61	37.98	4.20	57.32	4:49.06	7726	
3rd place, bronze medalist(s)	Sheldon Blockburger	United States	11.14	7.38	14.40	2.15	50.10	15.11	43.30	NM	63.16	4:41.20	7262	
4	Antonio Greene	Bahamas	11.27	7.10	12.56	1.91	51.60	15.12	39.32	4.20	56.80	4:51.10	7205	
5	Richard Hesketh	Canada	11.40	6.91	12.73	1.91	49.69	15.87	38.32	4.20	50.80	4:36.78	7120	
6	Miguel Valle	Cuba	11.00	7.34	13.92	1.91	49.45	14.48	38.88	NM	62.96	4:35.81	7087	
	Dave Masgay	United States	11.43	7.10	12.80	1.91	49.42	15.89	NM	4.60	63.44	DNS	DNF	
