= Athletics at the 1991 Pan American Games – Men's hammer throw =

Men's hammer throw at the Pan American Games

The men's hammer throw event at the 1991 Pan American Games was held in Havana, Cuba on 8 August.

== Results ==
Rank	Name	Nationality	#1	#2	#3	#4	#5	#6	Result	Notes
1st place, gold medalist(s)	Jim Driscoll	United States	71.40	x	72.46	71.66	71.28	72.78	72.78	
2nd place, silver medalist(s)	Jud Logan	United States	70.32	x	x	x	x	x	70.32	
3rd place, bronze medalist(s)	René Díaz	Cuba	x	x	55.44	x	68.36	x	68.36	
4	Guillermo Guzmán	Mexico	68.08	x	68.34	x	x	x	68.34	
5	Andrés Charadía	Argentina	66.32	66.10	67.74	x	66.62	68.22	68.22	
6	Marcelo Pugliese	Argentina	64.28	63.74	68.02	x	64.12	66.78	68.02	
7	Ian Maplethorpe	Canada	x	58.04	57.74	56.88	56.56	x	58.04	
8	Enrique Reina	Honduras	x	x	37.96	x	x	x	37.96	
	Eladio Hernández	Cuba							DNS	
