= 1997 Central American and Caribbean Championships in Athletics =

- Dates: 26–28 June
- Host city: San Juan, Puerto Rico
- Venue: Estadio Sixto Escobar

The 1997 Central American and Caribbean Championships in Athletics were held in San Juan, Puerto Rico between 26 and 28 June.

== Medal summary ==
=== Men's events ===
Event	Gold		Silver		Bronze	
100 metres (wind: +1.4 m/s)	Luis Pérez; Cuba	10.28	Jason Shelton; Jamaica	10.29	Carlos Villaseñor; Mexico	10.46
200 metres (wind: +1.9 m/s)	Iván García; Cuba	20.38 CR	Elston Cawley; Jamaica	20.85	Troy Douglas; Bermuda	20.88
400 metres	Danny McFarlane; Jamaica	45.47	Linval Laird; Jamaica	45.49	Dennis Darling; Bahamas	46.05
800 metres	Norberto Téllez; Cuba	1:47.78	Mario Watson; Jamaica	1:47.86	Alex Morgan; Jamaica	1:48.57
1500 metres	Héctor Torres; Mexico	3:47.23	José López; Venezuela	3:47.92	Terrance Armstrong; Bermuda	3:51.92
5000 metres	Herder Vásquez; Colombia	14:07.41	Víctor Rodríguez; Mexico	14:08.77	Juan Díaz; Venezuela	14:22.01
10,000 metres	Herder Vásquez; Colombia	30:21.94	Jacinto López; Colombia	30:24.21	Germán Beltrán; Venezuela	30:27.94
Half marathon	Víctor Rodríguez; Mexico	1:07:07	Carlos Grisales; Colombia	1:07:39	Pamenos Ballantyne; Saint Vincent and the Grenadines	1:08:25
110 metres hurdles (wind: +3.0 m/s)	Erik Batte; Cuba	13.70w	Yoel Hernández; Cuba	13.74w	Maurice Wignall; Jamaica	13.78w
400 metres hurdles	Dinsdale Morgan; Jamaica	49.28	Kemel Thompson; Jamaica	49.77	José Pérez; Cuba	50.92
3000 metres steeplechase	Félix Ladera; Venezuela	8:48.85	Salvador Miranda; Mexico	8:50.29	Néstor Nieves; Venezuela	8:50.46
4 × 100 metres relay	Cuba; Alfredo García-Baró; Ivan García; Luis Alberto Pérez-Rionda; Misael Ortiz	39.18	Jamaica; Elston Cawley; Jason Shelton; Garth Robinson; Jermaine Melbourne	39.7	Bahamas; Dennis Darling; Craig Hepburn; Andrew Tynes; Addis Huyler	39.85
4 × 400 metres relay	Jamaica; Garth Robinson; Linval Laird; Dennis Blake; Danny McFarlane	3:01.42 CR	Cuba; Omar Mena; Jorge Crusellas; Edel Hevia; Norberto Téllez	3:04.50	Bahamas; Dennis Darling; Avard Moncur; Addis Huyler; Demarius Cash	3:09.15
20,000 m track walk	Julio Martínez; Guatemala	1:26:24.40 CR	Querubín Moreno; Colombia	1:28:38.96	Alejandro López; Mexico	1:29:08.00
High jump	Gilmar Mayo; Colombia	2.25	Julio Luciano; Dominican Republic	2.15	Fred Valentin; Martinique	2.10
Pole vault	Alberto Manzano; Cuba	5.40	Edgar Díaz; Puerto Rico	5.30	Jorge Tienda; Mexico	4.90
Long jump	Iván Pedroso; Cuba	8.54 w +4.0 m/s	Jaime Jefferson; Cuba	8.01 w +5.2 m/s	Craig Hepburn; Bahamas	7.93 w
Triple jump	Jérôme Romain; Dominica	17.53w	Yoel García; Cuba	17.28w	Brian Wellman; Bermuda	17.03w
Shot put	Yojer Medina; Venezuela	18.11	José Rosario; Puerto Rico	17.49	Yosvany Obregón; Cuba	17.16
Discus throw	Alexis Elizalde; Cuba	64.28	Jean-Claude Retel; Guadeloupe	58.18	Frank Casañas; Cuba	55.32
Hammer throw	Alberto Sánchez; Cuba	72.10	Yosvany Suárez; Cuba	69.90	Guillermo Guzmán; Mexico	67.10
Javelin throw	Emeterio González; Cuba	81.66 CR	Isbel Luaces; Cuba	73.80	Daniel Alonzo; Dominican Republic	65.80
Decathlon	Eugenio Balanqué; Cuba	7633	William Gallardo; Cuba	6973	Eladio Farfán; Venezuela	5818

=== Women's events ===
Event	Gold		Silver		Bronze	
100 metres (wind: +1.4 m/s)	Debbie Ferguson; Bahamas	11.29	Beverly Grant; Jamaica	11.31	Heather Samuel; Antigua and Barbuda	11.38
200 metres (wind: +1.9 m/s)	Idalmis Bonne; Cuba	23.24	Felipa Palacios; Colombia	23.36	Heather Samuel; Antigua and Barbuda	23.73
400 metres	Julia Duporty; Cuba	51.96	Idalmis Bonne; Cuba	52.01	Tonique Williams; Bahamas	52.38
800 metres	Ana Fidelia Quirot; Cuba	1:59.01 CR	Mairelín Fuentes; Cuba	2:03.36	Dawn Williams-Sewer; Dominica	2:03.60
1500 metres	Ana Fidelia Quirot; Cuba	4:18.00 CR	Mardrea Hyman; Jamaica	4:21.31	Yesenia Centeno; Cuba	4:23.72
5000 metres	Susana A. Díaz; Mexico	16:31.87 CR	Sonia Betancourt; Mexico	17:02.95	Evelyn Rojas; Costa Rica	17:48.59
10,000 metres	Stella Castro; Colombia	34:34.67	Iglandini González; Colombia	37:06.50	Elsa Monterroso; Guatemala	36:57.30
Half marathon	Stella Castro; Colombia	1:17:15	Iglandini González; Colombia	1:22:06	Maribel Burgos; Puerto Rico	1:24:43
100 metres hurdles (wind: +0.9 m/s)	Aliuska López; Cuba	13.19	Patrina Allen; Jamaica	13.26	Andrea Blackett; Barbados	13.44
400 metres hurdles	Andrea Blackett; Barbados	55.64 CR	Daimí Pernía; Cuba	56.14	Tanya Jarrett; Jamaica	57.73
4 × 100 metres relay	Bahamas; Eldece Clarke-Lewis; Debbie Ferguson; Tonique Williams; Dewana Wright	44.00 CR	Colombia; Mirtha Brock; Felipa Palacios; Patricia Rodríguez; Sandra Borrero	44.29	Cuba; Idalia Hechavarría; Dainelky Pérez; Daimí Pernía; Yahumara Neyra	44.73
4 × 400 metres relay	Cuba; Idalmis Bonne; Julia Duporty; Odalmis Limonta; Nancy McLeon	3:29.30	Jamaica; Michelle Ballentine; Charmaine Howell; Nadia Graham-Hutchinson; Cecile Cargill	3:32.28	Puerto Rico; Militza Castro; Xiomara Davila; Sandra Moya; Yamelis Ortiz	3:39.07
10000 m track walk	Graciela Mendoza; Mexico	47:43.99	Oslaidis Cruz; Cuba	48:32.09t	Liliana Bermeo; Colombia	48:50.27
High jump	Niurka Lussón; Cuba	1.81	Karen Beautle; Jamaica	1.81	Romary Rifka; Mexico	1.79
Pole vault	Eva Vázquez; Puerto Rico	3.25 CR	Lorena Espinoza; Mexico	3.25	Estrella Martínez; Mexico	2.50
Long jump	Nadine Caster; Martinique	6.56	Jackie Edwards; Bahamas	6.52	Elisa Pérez; Dominican Republic	6.28
Triple jump	Olga Cepero; Cuba	14.14w	Yamilé Aldama; Cuba	14.12w	Cherita Howard; Barbados	12.94w
Shot put	Herminia Fernández; Cuba	17.36	Christelle Bornil; Martinique	15.10	María Mercedes; Dominican Republic	13.38
Discus throw	Bárbara Hechevarría; Cuba	57.42	Maritza Martén; Cuba	57.06	Christelle Bornil; Martinique	47.32
Hammer throw	María Eugenia Villamizar; Colombia	53.82 CR	Nancy Guillén; El Salvador	52.98	Violeta Guzmán; Mexico	52.70
Javelin throw	Osleidys Menéndez; Cuba	63.08	Laverne Eve; Bahamas	58.16	Sabina Moya; Colombia	55.94
Heptathlon	Zorobabelia Córdoba; Colombia	5503	Lisa Wright; Jamaica	5491	Osiris Pedroso; Cuba	5210

== Medal table ==
* Host nation (Puerto Rico)

Rank	Nation	Gold	Silver	Bronze	Total
1	Cuba (CUB)	22	13	6	41
2	Colombia (COL)	7	7	2	16
3	Mexico (MEX)	4	4	7	15
4	Jamaica (JAM)	3	12	3	18
5	Bahamas (BAH)	2	2	4	8
6	Venezuela (VEN)	2	1	4	7
7	Puerto Rico (PUR)*	1	2	2	5
8	Martinique (MTQ)	1	1	2	4
9	Barbados (BAR)	1	0	3	4
10	Dominica (DMA)	1	0	1	2
10	Guatemala (GUA)	1	0	1	2
12	Dominican Republic (DOM)	0	1	3	4
13	El Salvador (ESA)	0	1	0	1
13	Guadeloupe (GLP)	0	1	0	1
15	Bermuda (BER)	0	0	3	3
16	Antigua and Barbuda (ATG)	0	0	2	2
17	Costa Rica (CRC)	0	0	1	1
17	Saint Vincent and the Grenadines (VIN)	0	0	1	1
Totals (18 entries)		45	45	45	135
