= 1986 Central American and Caribbean Junior Championships in Athletics =

VII Central American and Caribbean Junior Championships
- Dates: 26–29 June
- Host city: Mexico City, Mexico
- Level: Junior and Youth
- Events: 74 (38 junior, 36 youth)
- Participation: about 262 (154 junior, 108 youth) athletes from 12 nations

The 7th Central American and Caribbean Junior Championships was held in Mexico City, Mexico, on 26–29 June 1986. Results were affected by altitude.

== Medal summary ==
Medal winners are published by category: Junior A, Male, Junior A, Female, and Junior B. Complete results can be found on the World Junior Athletics History website.

=== Male Junior A (under 20) ===
| Event | Gold | | Silver | | Bronze | |
|---|---|---|---|---|---|---|
| 100 metres | Michael Newbold (BAH) | 10.46A | Eduardo Nava (MEX) | 10.48A | Joel Isasi (CUB) | 10.49A |
| 200 metres | Roberto Hernández (CUB) | 20.70A | Michael Newbold (BAH) | 21.40A | Eduardo Nava (MEX) | 21.55A |
| 400 metres | Roberto Hernández (CUB) | 45.19A | Eulogio Mordoche (CUB) | 46.66A | Charles Bodington (VEN) | 47.44A |
| 800 metres | Luis Cadogan (CUB) | 1:54.22A | Daniel Tovar (MEX) | 1:54.50A | Jorge Irizarry (PUR) | 1:55.67A |
| 1500 metres | Ignacio Fragoso (MEX) | 3:53.9A | Alberto Almendáriz (MEX) | 3:56.6A | Amado Ramos (CUB) | 4:01.8A |
| 5000 metres | Ignacio Fragoso (MEX) | 15:07.2A | Gerardo García (MEX) | 15:13.0A | José Carmona (VEN) | 15:35.5A |
| 10,000 metres | Francisco García (MEX) | 32:02.5A | José Carmona (VEN) | 32:06.9A | Lorenzo García (MEX) | 32:07.2A |
| 3000 metres steeplechase | Mauricio Fabián (MEX) | 9:27.3A | Isidro Navarro (MEX) | 9:45.0A | Ángel Rodríguez (CUB) | 9:48.5A |
| 110 metres hurdles | Emilio Valle (CUB) | 14.12A | Manuel Mayor (CUB) | 14.40A | Andrew Smith (BAH) | 15.09A |
| 400 metres hurdles | Emilio Valle (CUB) | 50.66A | Antonio Smith (VEN) | 50.85A | Daniel Velázquez (PUR) | 52.67A |
| High jump | Javier Sotomayor (CUB) | 2.31A | Marino Drake (CUB) | 2.15A | José Escalera (PUR) | 2.03 |
| Pole vault | Héctor Lescay (CUB) | 4.95A | Lázaro Pírez (CUB) | 4.95A | Konstantín Zagustín (VEN) | 4.25A |
| Long jump | Luis Bueno (CUB) | 7.69A | Edward Manderson (CAY) | 7.65A | Lisandro Milhet (CUB) | 7.57A |
| Triple jump | Juan Miguel López (CUB) | 16.80A | Dudson Higgins (BAH) | 16.38A | Héctor Marquetti (CUB) | 15.98A |
| Shot put | Jorge Montenegro (CUB) | 15.56A | Carlos Fandiño (CUB) | 14.50A | Troy Patterson (BAR) | 14.26A |
| Discus throw | Rolando Rivalta (CUB) | 51.64A | Alexis Elizalde (CUB) | 48.96A | Troy Patterson (BAR) | 44.36A |
| Hammer throw | René Díaz (CUB) | 61.90A | Eddy Aguilar (CUB) | 54.02A | Javier Rivera (PUR) | 48.60A |
| Javelin throw | Juan Oxamendi (CUB) | 69.68A | José Hernández (CUB) | 67.92A | Luis Carrasco (VEN) | 58.34A |
| Decathlon | Miguel Valle (CUB) | 7101A | Dionisio Lugo (VEN) | 6529A | Jorge Salazar (CUB) | 6478A |
| 10,000 metres track walk | Carlos Mercenario (MEX) | 43:31.9A | Francisco Reyes (MEX) | 46:36.1A | Daniel Vargas (CUB) | 47:08.6A |
| 4 × 100 metres relay | Bahamas | 40.62A | Cuba | 40.91A | Puerto Rico | 41.25A |
| 4 × 400 metres relay | Cuba | 3:10.67A | Puerto Rico | 3:14.93A | Mexico | 3:15.41A |

=== Female Junior A (under 20) ===
| Event | Gold | | Silver | | Bronze | |
|---|---|---|---|---|---|---|
| 100 metres | Sheena Sturrup (BAH) | 11.83A | Eusebia Riquelme (CUB) | 11.85A | Dagmar Rosado (PUR) | 12.17A |
| 200 metres | Sheena Sturrup (BAH) | 24.11A | Yolande Straughn (BAR) | 24.49A | Aliuska López (CUB) | 24.65A |
| 400 metres | Yolande Straughn (BAR) | 54.67A | Sheena Sturrup (BAH) | 56.06A | Nelsa Vinent (CUB) | 56.84A |
| 800 metres | Maura Savón (CUB) | 2:10.98A | Sandra Wellington (CAY) | 2:19.84A | Sonia Escalera (PUR) | 2:20.24A |
| 1500 metres | Maura Savón (CUB) | 4:51.9A | Sonia Betancourt (MEX) | 4:52.2A | María Contreras (CUB) | 5:02.2A |
| 3000 metres | María del Carmen Díaz (MEX) | 10:16.4A | Sonia Betancourt (MEX) | 10:18.1A | María Contreras (CUB) | 11:05.1A |
| 100 metres hurdles | Aliuska López (CUB) | 13.56A | Niurka Montalvo (CUB) | 14.20A | Liz Pieternella (AHO) | 14.57A |
| 400 metres hurdles | Liz Pieternella (AHO) | 63.20A | Cynthia Gutiérrez (MEX) | 64.31A | Judy McDonald (BAH) | 65.81A |
| High jump | María del Carmen García (CUB) | 1.80A | Judy McDonald (BAH) | 1.62A | Lorena Espinoza (MEX) | 1.62A |
| Long jump | Niurka Montalvo (CUB) | 6.29A | Laiza Carrillo (CUB) | 6.22A | Catherine Richards (BAR) | 6.09A |
| Shot put | Jacqueline Laza (CUB) | 13.93A | Marlene Palacios (CUB) | 13.79A | Millicent McCartney (BAH) | ??? |
| Discus throw | Idalmis Leyva (CUB) | 49.42A | Millicent McCartney (BAH) | 43.12A | Leonor Gilbert (CUB) | 41.96A |
| Javelin throw | Xiomara Rivero (CUB) | 64.56A | Dianne Woodside (BAH) | 41.64A | Liliana Gualito (MEX) | 39.08A |
| Heptathlon | Laiza Carrillo (CUB) | 4834A | Irma García (MEX) | 3134A | Citalli Sáinz (MEX) | 3064A |
| 4 × 100 metres relay | Cuba | 46.57A | Bahamas | 49.12A | Mexico | 50.50A |
| 4 × 400 metres relay | Cuba | 3:45.91A | Puerto Rico | 3:55.60A | Mexico | 3:59.63A |

=== Male Junior B (under 17) ===
| Event | Gold | | Silver | | Bronze | |
|---|---|---|---|---|---|---|
| 100 metres | Timothy Clinton (BAH) | 10.73A | Jorge Ávila (VEN) | 11.17A | Rafael Viloria (VEN) | 11.19A |
| 200 metres | Timothy Clinton (BAH) | 22.32A | Félix Ramos (PUR) | 22.96A | Enrique López (MEX) | 23.20A |
| 400 metres | Raphael Roett (BAH) | 50.60A | Arturo Espejel (MEX) | 51.16A | Carlos Dávila (PUR) | 51.87A |
| 800 metres | Pedro Rico (MEX) | 1:59.17A | Dahud Hamind (VEN) | 1:59.64A | Jaime Renta (PUR) | 2:01.81A |
| 1500 metres | José Aguado (MEX) | 4:08.0A | Luis Hernández (PUR) | 4:12.9A | José López (MEX) | 4:15.6A |
| 3000 metres | José Aguado (MEX) | 9:06.0A | Luis Hernández (PUR) | 10:10.9A | | |
| 2000 metres steeplechase | Edgar Torres (MEX) | 6:34.1A | José Reyes (VEN) | 6:52.5A | Erik Rivera (PUR) | 7:06.9A |
| 110 metres hurdles | Esdras Paredes (VEN) | 14.98A | Raúl Blanco (PUR) | 15.09A | Manuel Franco (MEX) | 15.79A |
| 400 metres hurdles | Esdras Paredes (VEN) | 53.48A | Diego Sesta (VEN) | 56.85A | Víctor Angulo (MEX) | 56.87A |
| High jump | Francisco Camarena (MEX) | 1.90A | Emile Ledee (BAH) | 1.90A | Luis Monfort (MEX) | 1.80A |
| Pole vault | Alfred Bejas (MEX) | 3.45A | Alejandro Morales (MEX) | 3.25A | Jesús Velázquez (MEX) | 2.95A |
| Long jump | Emile Ledee (BAH) | 6.62A | Antonio Quan (BIZ) | 6.46A | José Abousaid (MEX) | 5.93A |
| Triple jump | Antonio Quan (BIZ) | 13.99A | Emile Ledee (BAH) | 13.87A | Juan Castañeda (MEX) | 13.67A |
| Shot put | Raimundo Monasterios (VEN) | 15.96A | Rufus Kemp (BAH) | 14.64A | Ricardo Vázquez (PUR) | 14.40A |
| Discus throw | Rufus Kemp (BAH) | 48.62A | Raimundo Monasterios (VEN) | 47.10A | Faisal Díaz (MEX) | 46.00A |
| Hammer throw | Marcos Borjas (VEN) | 50.70A | Hugo Martínez (VEN) | 39.24A | Artemio Gómez (MEX) | 38.40A |
| Javelin throw | Haywood Thompson (BAH) | 53.20A | Daniel Mijares (VEN) | 52.40A | Kevin Brown (BAH) | 51.88A |
| Heptathlon | José Rodríguez (VEN) | 5034A | Renny Pérez (VEN) | 4856A | Heriberto Silva (MEX) | 4641A |
| 5000 metres track walk | Alberto Cruz (MEX) | 22:57 | Nicolás Lara (MEX) | 24:36 | Javier Coto (PUR) | 25:38 |
| 4 × 100 metres relay | Mexico | 44.70A | Puerto Rico | 44.96A | Bahamas | 45.24A |
| 4 × 400 metres relay | Mexico | 3:26.48A | Puerto Rico | 3:26.59A | Venezuela | 3:30.38A |

=== Female Junior B (under 17) ===
| Event | Gold | | Silver | | Bronze | |
|---|---|---|---|---|---|---|
| 100 metres | Liliana Allen (CUB) | 11.83A | Mirna Rodríguez (PUR) | 11.98A | Kathy Thompson (BAH) | 12.12A |
| 200 metres | Mirna Rodríguez (PUR) | 24.66A | Kathy Thompson (BAH) | 24.71A | Liliana Allen (CUB) | 24.81A |
| 400 metres | Rebeca Vega (PUR) | 57.73A | Milagros Echevarría (CUB) | 58.30A | Winifred Quintero (MEX) | 58.97A |
| 800 metres | Verónica González (MEX) | 2:19.57A | Mariska Stubbs (BAH) | 2:19.71A | Laura Esteban (MEX) | 2:20.23A |
| 1200 metres | Irma Betancourt (MEX) | 4:00.6A | Mariska Stubbs (BAH) | 4:05.7A | Ruth Salas (CRC) | 4:25.8A |
| 100 metres hurdles | Yanelis Valiente (CUB) | 14.06A | Joyce Meléndez (PUR) | 14.43A | Idalis Flores (VEN) | 14.76A |
| 300 metres hurdles | Joyce Meléndez (PUR) | 43.20A | Milagros Echevarría (CUB) | 43.51A | Yanelis Valiente (CUB) | 44.54A |
| High jump | Mayra Medina (PUR) | 1.70A | Romary Rifka (MEX) | 1.65A | Patricia Villanueva (MEX) | 1.65A |
| Long jump | Romary Rifka (MEX) | 6.01A | Jackie Edwards (BAH) | 5.96A | Audrey González (VEN) | 5.91A |
| Shot put | Denise Taylor (BAH) | 11.94A | Samia Mena (MEX) | 10.31A | Rita Solís (MEX) | 10.04A |
| Discus throw | Denise Taylor (BAH) | 43.50A | Irma Adams (MEX) | 32.64A | Josefina Salmerón (VEN) | 32.36A |
| Javelin throw | Isel López (CUB) | 57.44A | Ruth Martínez (VEN) | 36.92A | Josefina Salmerón (VEN) | 35.94A |
| Pentathlon | Yolaida Pompa (CUB) | 3361A | Rita Solís (MEX) | 3087A | Danielle Jongkind (AHO) | 2774A |
| 4 × 100 metres relay | Puerto Rico | 47.34A | Cuba | 47.98A | Mexico | 49.71A |
| 4 × 400 metres relay | Puerto Rico | 3:55.49A | Mexico | 3:56.77A | Bahamas | 4:07.60A |

== Medal table (unofficial) ==
* Host nation (Mexico)

| Rank | Nation | Gold | Silver | Bronze | Total |
|---|---|---|---|---|---|
| 1 | Cuba (CUB) | 30 | 16 | 14 | 60 |
| 2 | Mexico (MEX)* | 18 | 18 | 24 | 60 |
| 3 | Bahamas (BAH) | 12 | 14 | 7 | 33 |
| 4 | Puerto Rico (PUR) | 6 | 10 | 12 | 28 |
| 5 | Venezuela (VEN) | 5 | 12 | 10 | 27 |
| 6 | Barbados (BAR) | 1 | 1 | 3 | 5 |
| 7 | Belize (BIZ) | 1 | 1 | 0 | 2 |
| 8 | Netherlands Antilles (AHO) | 1 | 0 | 2 | 3 |
| 9 | Cayman Islands (CAY) | 0 | 2 | 0 | 2 |
| 10 | Costa Rica (CRC) | 0 | 0 | 1 | 1 |
| Totals (10 entries) | | 74 | 74 | 73 | 221 |

== Participation (unofficial) ==
Belize competed for the first time at the championships. Detailed result lists can be found on the World Junior Athletics History website. An unofficial count yields a number of about 262 athletes (154 junior (under-20) and 108 youth (under-17)) from about 12 countries:

- Bahamas (22)
- Barbados (8)
- Belize (1)
- Cayman Islands (2)
- Costa Rica (4)
- Cuba (51)
- El Salvador (3)
- (Mexico) México (88)
- Netherlands Antilles (5)
- (Panama) Panamá (1)
- Puerto Rico (45)
- Venezuela (32)
