= 1989 Central American and Caribbean Championships in Athletics =

Held at the Estadio Sixto Escobar in San Juan, Puerto Rico

- Dates: 27–29 July
- Host city: San Juan, Puerto Rico
- Venue: Estadio Sixto Escobar

The 1989 Central American and Caribbean Championships in Athletics were held at the Estadio Sixto Escobar in San Juan, Puerto Rico between 27–29 July.

== Medal summary ==
=== Men's events ===
Event	Gold		Silver		Bronze	
100 metres	Joel Isasi; Cuba	10.33	Andrés Simón; Cuba	10.34	Andrew Smith; Jamaica	10.47
200 metres	Edgardo Guilbe; Puerto Rico	20.53 CR	Clive Wright; Jamaica	20.55	Patrick O'Connor; Jamaica	20.95
400 metres	Roberto Hernández; Cuba	44.84 CR	Lázaro Martínez; Cuba	45.56	Seibert Straughn; Barbados	45.63
800 metres	Jorge Rosales; Cuba	1:50.24	Luis Toledo; Mexico	1:50.29	Jorge Irizarry; Puerto Rico	1:51.33
1500 metres	Linton McKenzie; Jamaica	3:41.27 CR	José López; Venezuela	3:41.56	José Isaac; Cuba	3:42.30
5000 metres	Armando Quintanilla; Mexico	14:10.00	Ignacio Fragoso; Mexico	14:28.50	José Morales; Guatemala	14:35.00
10,000 metres	Salvador Parra; Mexico	29:29.73 CR	Alberto Cuba; Cuba	29:36.48	Oscar González; Venezuela	29:48.00
Half marathon	Salvador García; Mexico	1:07:56	César Mercado; Puerto Rico	1:08:38	Horacio Cabrera; Mexico	1:08:41
110 metres hurdles	Emilio Valle; Cuba	13.48 CR	Andrew Parker; Jamaica	13.89	Elvis Cedeño; Venezuela	14.09
400 metres hurdles	Domingo Cordero; Puerto Rico	50.22	Juan Gutiérrez; Mexico	50.80	Wilfredo Ferrer; Venezuela	50.95
3000 metres steeplechase	Juan Ramón Conde; Cuba	8:48.13	Adalberto Vélez; Mexico	8:48.19	José Martínez; Venezuela	8:51.81
4 × 100 metres relay	Jamaica; John Mair; Andrew Smith; Patrick O'Connor; Clive Wright	39.51	Cuba; Joel Isasi; Jaime Jefferson; Andrés Simón; Emilio Valle	39.89	Puerto Rico	40.7
4 × 400 metres relay	Cuba; Roberto Hernández; Lázaro Martínez; Agustín Pavo; Juan Carlos Hernández	3:04.90	Jamaica; John Taylor; Howard Burnett; Devon Morris; Patrick O'Connor	3:05.57	Puerto Rico	3:12.70
20 km road walk	Martín Bermúdez; Mexico	1:28:11 CR	Ernesto Canto; Mexico	1:29:02	Daniel Vargas; Cuba	1:30:42
High jump	Javier Sotomayor; Cuba	2.44 CR	Troy Kemp; Bahamas	2.26	Antonio Burgos; Puerto Rico	2.24
Pole vault	Ángel García; Cuba	4.95	Miguel Escoto; Mexico	4.85	Konstantín Zagustín; Venezuela	4.60
Long jump	Jaime Jefferson; Cuba	7.96	Luis Bueno; Cuba	7.92	Elmer Williams; Puerto Rico	7.78
Triple jump	Jorge Reyna; Cuba	17.12 CR	Juan Miguel López; Cuba	16.54	Steve Hanna; Bahamas	16.07
Shot put	Jorge Montenegro; Cuba	17.49	Samuel Crespo; Puerto Rico	17.25	Hubert Maingot; Trinidad and Tobago	16.39
Discus throw	Roberto Moya; Cuba	62.12	Gabriel Pedroso; Cuba	56.86	Samuel Crespo; Puerto Rico	51.00
Hammer throw	René Díaz; Cuba	62.90	Guillermo Guzmán; Mexico	59.56	Eddy Concepción; Cuba	57.00
Javelin throw	Ramón González; Cuba	78.64 CR	Héctor Duharte; Cuba	74.74	Luis Carrasco; Venezuela	66.32
Decathlon	Antonio Greene; Bahamas	7421 NR	Antonio Greene; Bahamas	7421	José Velázquez; Venezuela	7083

=== Women's events ===
Event	Gold		Silver		Bronze	
100 metres (wind: +0.6 m/s)	Pauline Davis; Bahamas	11.25	Liliana Allen; Cuba	11.32	Angela Williams; Trinidad and Tobago	11.51
200 metres	Grace Jackson; Jamaica	22.36 CR	Angela Williams; Trinidad and Tobago	23.01	Liliana Allen; Cuba	23.27
400 metres	Ana Fidelia Quirot; Cuba	50.63 CR	Angela Joseph; Trinidad and Tobago	52.40	Grace Jackson; Jamaica	53.00
800 metres	Ana Fidelia Quirot; Cuba	2:02.24 CR	Donna-Mae Bean; Bermuda	2:12.10	Sonia Escalera; Puerto Rico	2:12.60
1500 metres	Milagro Rodríguez; Cuba	4:24.37	Olga Ávalos; Mexico	4:27.40	Lorie Ann Adams; Guyana	4:38.90
3000 metres	María del Carmen Díaz; Mexico	9:34.00 CR	Milagro Rodríguez; Cuba	9:36.30	Olga Ávalos; Mexico	9:39.20
10,000 metres	Araceli Salas; Mexico	35:15.90	Maribel Durruty; Cuba	35:27.70	Santa Velázquez; Mexico	35:43.50
100 metres hurdles	Odalys Adams; Cuba	13.01 CR	Aliuska López; Cuba	13.33	Michelle Freeman; Jamaica	13.64
400 metres hurdles	Elsa Jiménez; Cuba	58.03	Monique Millar; Bahamas	60.81	Alejandra Quintanar; Mexico	61.25
4 × 100 metres relay	Cuba; Odalys Adams; Liliana Allen; Aliuska López; Eusebia Riquelme	45.12	Bahamas ? ? ? Pauline Davis	46.50	Puerto Rico	49.46
4 × 400 metres relay	Cuba; Ana Fidelia Quirot; Mercedes Álvarez; Elsa Jiménez; Milagros Rodríguez	3:34.46	Bahamas	3:39.46	Puerto Rico	3:53.10
10000 m track walk	Graciela Mendoza; Mexico	48:19.28 CR	Maricela Chávez; Mexico	51:53.87		
High jump	Silvia Costa; Cuba	1.85	Ioamnet Quintero; Cuba	1.80	Mayra Medina; Puerto Rico	1.70
Long jump	Eloína Echevarría; Cuba	6.59	Euphemia Huggins; Trinidad and Tobago	6.47	Daphne Saunders; Bahamas	6.41
Shot put	Herminia Fernández; Cuba	16.07	Idalmis Leyva; Cuba	14.17	Virginia Salomón; Venezuela	14.12
Discus throw	Idalmis Leyva; Cuba	58.76	Olga Gómez; Cuba	55.16	Denise Taylor; Bahamas	39.90
Javelin throw	Laverne Eve; Bahamas	62.42	Dulce García; Cuba	61.18	Herminia Bouza; Cuba	57.82
Heptathlon	Yolaida Pompa; Cuba	5224	Dornel Butler; Bahamas	5053	Lucila Carmona; Mexico	4388

== Medal table ==
* Host nation (Puerto Rico)

Rank	Nation	Gold	Silver	Bronze	Total
1	Cuba (CUB)	26	16	5	47
2	Mexico (MEX)	7	9	5	21
3	Bahamas (BAH)	3	6	3	12
4	Jamaica (JAM)	3	3	4	10
5	Puerto Rico (PUR)*	2	2	10	14
6	Trinidad and Tobago (TTO)	0	3	2	5
7	Venezuela (VEN)	0	1	8	9
8	Bermuda (BER)	0	1	0	1
9	Barbados (BAR)	0	0	1	1
9	Guatemala (GUA)	0	0	1	1
9	Guyana (GUY)	0	0	1	1
Totals (11 entries)		41	41	40	122

== See also ==
- 1989 in athletics (track and field)
