= Carlos Fandiño =

Cuban shot putter (born 1969)

Carlos Fandiño (born 10 June 1969) is a retired Cuban shot putter.

He won the silver medal at the 1986 Central American and Caribbean Junior Championships, the gold medal at the 1988 Central American and Caribbean Junior Championships (as well as a discus bronze), the gold medal at the 1993 Central American and Caribbean Championships, and the silver medal at the 1993 Central American and Caribbean Games and finished sixth at the 1994 World Cup. He also competed at the 1988 World Junior Championships without reaching the final.

He became Cuban champion in 1994, 1995, 1997 and 1998 in between the dominance Jorge Montenegro and Alexis Paumier (with Yosvany Obregón winning in 1996).

His personal best put was 20.03 metres, achieved in July 2000 in Havana.
