= Ignacio Fragoso =

Mexican long-distance runner

Personal information
- Born: February 6, 1968 (age 58)

Sport
- Sport: Track and field
Medal record
Representing Mexico
Pan American Games
Silver medal – second place	1991 Havana	5000m
CAC Junior Championships (U20)
Gold medal – first place	1986 Mexico City	1500 m
Gold medal – first place	1986 Mexico City	5000 m

Ignacio Fragoso Galindo (born February 6, 1968) is a retired male long-distance runner from Mexico.

== Career ==
He set his personal best in the men's 5,000 metres event (13:59.48) on June 5, 1993 at a meet in Seville, Spain.

== Achievements ==
Year	Competition	Venue	Position	Event	Notes
Representing Mexico
1986	Central American and Caribbean Junior Championships (U-20)	Mexico City, México	1st	1500 m	3:53.9 A
1986	Central American and Caribbean Junior Championships (U-20)	Mexico City, México	1st	5000 m	15:07.2 A
1986	World Junior Championships	Athens, Greece	25th (h)	5000m	14:53.01
1989	Central American and Caribbean Championships	San Juan, Puerto Rico	2nd	5,000 m	14:28.50
1991	Pan American Games	Havana, Cuba	2nd	5,000 m	13:35.83
1992	Summer Olympics	Barcelona, Spain	11th	5,000 m	13:22.11
