= Athletics at the 1999 Pan American Games – Women's 10,000 metres =

Women's 10,000 metres at the Pan American Games

The women's 10,000 metres event at the 1999 Pan American Games was held on July 28.

== Results ==
| Rank | Name | Nationality | Time | Notes |
|---|---|---|---|---|
| 1st place, gold medalist(s) | Nora Rocha | Mexico | 32:56.51 | |
| 2nd place, silver medalist(s) | Stella Castro | Colombia | 33:05.97 | |
| 3rd place, bronze medalist(s) | Tina Connelly | Canada | 33:27.87 | |
| 4 | Shelly Steely | United States | 33:36.44 | |
| 5 | Martha Tenorio | Ecuador | 33:59.86 | |
| 6 | Márcia Narloch | Brazil | 34:13.65 | |
| 7 | Shelly Smathers | United States | 34:20.42 | |
| 8 | Mariela González | Cuba | 34:45.94 | |
| 9 | Jackie Morgan | United States Virgin Islands | 37:02.48 | |
| | Madaí Pérez | Mexico | DNF | |
| | Érika Olivera | Chile | DNS | |
