= Barrientos Memorial =

Annual track and field meeting in Cuba

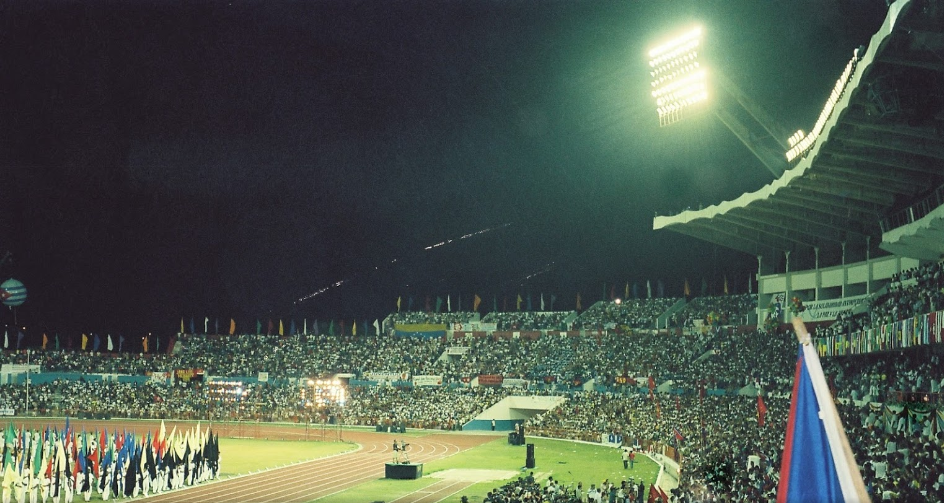
- The host stadium
- Date: May
- Location: Havana, Cuba
- Event type: Track and field
- Established: 1946

The Barrientos Memorial (Spanish: Memorial José Barrientos) is an annual track and field meeting in Havana, Cuba each May. The event was first held in 1946, in recognition of José Barrientos (a former Cuban Olympic sprinter), who died in an aviation accident the previous year. It is the most prominent annual athletics event in Cuba, alongside the Copa Cuba. It is one of the longest-running track and field meetings in Latin America, and the oldest in the Caribbean.

== History ==
For the first two editions, the competition was held at the Estadio Universitario Juan Abrantes. After a long residency at Estadio Pedro Marrero, the meet moved to its current venue, the Estadio Panamericano, in 1992. The meet was held at the Estadio José Pepe del Cabo, outside of the Cuban capital, in 1978 and 1982 due to ongoing works at the Estadio Pedro Marrero during those periods. The competition principally features national and international level Cuban athletes, though foreign athletes have also been on the programme since 1950, with past attendees including Donald Quarrie, Nenad Stekić, and American sprinters Dennis Mitchell and Calvin Smith.

The competition regularly serves as the national Cuban Athletics Championships. The meeting takes place over one to three days, depending on the level of participation. It is also frequently used to determine the national teams for regional competitions, such as the Pan American Games and Central American and Caribbean Games.

== See also ==
- List of Cuban Athletics Championships winners
