= Mario Vernon-Watson =

Jamaican middle-distance runner (born 1971)

Personal information
- Born: 26 April 1971 (age 54)

Sport
- Sport: Track and field

Mario Vernon-Watson (born 26 April 1971) is a retired Jamaican middle-distance runner who specialised in the 800 metres. He represented his country at the 1997 World Indoor Championships and 1997 World Championships. In addition, he won several medals on regional level.

Vernon-Watson competed for the George Mason Patriots track and field team in the NCAA.

He holds the national record in the indoor 1000 metres.

He is now an "Emotional disabilities teacher" at Carter G. Woodson High School in Fairfax, Virginia

== Competition record ==
Year	Competition	Venue	Position	Event	Notes
Representing Jamaica
1993	Central American and Caribbean Championships	Cali, Colombia	2nd	800 m	1:47.79
1994	Commonwealth Games	Victoria, Canada	17th (h)	800 m	1:48.75
1995	Central American and Caribbean Championships	Guatemala City, Guatemala	1st	800 m	1:46.88
1995	Universiade	Fukuoka, Japan	6th (sf)	800 m	1:48.23
1995	Universiade	Fukuoka, Japan	5th	4x400 m	3:04.77
1997	World Indoor Championships	Paris, France	5th (sf)	800 m	1:48.32
1997	Central American and Caribbean Championships	San Juan, Puerto Rico	2nd	800 m	1:47.86
1997	World Championships	Athens, Greece	30th (qf)	800 m	1:49.52
1999	Central American and Caribbean Championships	Bridgetown, Barbados	2nd	800 m	1:46.92
1999	Central American and Caribbean Championships	Bridgetown, Barbados	2nd	4x400 m	3:03.82
1999	Pan American Games	Winnipeg, Canada	6th	800 m	1:48.19

== Personal bests ==
Outdoor

- 800 metres – 1:45.58 (Fairfax 1996)

Indoor

- 800 metres – 1:47.33 (Boston 1997)
- 1000 metres – 2:19.96 (Boston 2000) NR
