= Antonio Greene =

Bahamian decathlete

Sport
- Sport: Track and field
Medal record
Representing Bahamas
Central American and Caribbean Games
| Bronze medal – third place | 1990 Mexico City | Decathlon |

Antonio Greene is a retired Bahamian decathlete.

He won the gold medal at the 1989 Central American and Caribbean Championships, the bronze medal at the 1990 Central American and Caribbean Games, and finished fourth at the 1991 Pan American Games,

His personal best score was 7421 points, achieved at the 1989 Central American and Caribbean Championships in San Juan, Puerto Rico. This was the Bahamian record until 2019.
