= Herder Vásquez =

Colombian long-distance runner (born 1967)

Personal information
- Full name: Herder Herberto Vásquez Corredor
- Nationality: Colombian
- Born: 20 June 1967 (age 58) Sotaquirá, Colombia
- Height: 1.70 m (5 ft 7 in)

Sport
- Sport: Long-distance running
- Event(s): 5000 metres 10,000 metres Half marathon

Herder Herberto Vásquez Corredor (born 20 June 1967) is a Colombian long-distance runner. Participating in two Olympic Games, he was also a quadruple Central American and Caribbean champion from 1993 and 1997, a triple Bolivarian Games champion, and placed as high as 7th at the World Half Marathon Championships.

== Career ==
In global track competitions, he competed in the 1500 and 5000 metres at the 1986 World Junior Championships; the 5000 and 10,000 metres at the 1992 Olympic Games; and the 10,000 metres at the 1996 Olympic Games. On neither occasion he reached the final.

In regional track competitions, he won bronze medals in the 5000 and 10,000 metres at the 1990 Central American and Caribbean Games, won silver and gold in the 5000 and 10,000 metres at the 1996 Ibero-American Championships, won both the 5000 and 10,000 metres at the 1993 and 1997 Central American and Caribbean Championships, and finished fourth in the 10,000 metres at the 1998 Central American and Caribbean Games. At the Bolivarian Games, Vásquez won a bronze medal in the 1500 metres at the 1985 edition; gold medals in the 5000 metres at the 1985 and 1997 edition, and a gold medal in the 10,000 metres in 1997 as well.

In global road events, his highest achievement was a seventh place at the 1995 World Half Marathon Championships. He also finished 25th at the 1997 World Half Marathon Championships and 39th at the 2000 World Half Marathon Championships. He also won multiple medals at the South American Cross Country Championships.

His personal best times on the track were 13:43.95 minutes in the 5000 metres (1992); 27:56.10 minutes in the 10,000 metres (1992). His half marathon record was 1:01:29 hours, achieved in 1996 in Kyoto, which was also the Colombian record.
