= José López (athlete) =

Venezuelan middle-distance runner

Personal information
- Full name: José Gregorio López Martínez
- Born: 18 June 1967 (age 59)

Sport
- Sport: Athletics
- Event: 1500 metres
Medal record
Representing Venezuela
Central American and Caribbean Games
Gold medal – first place	1993 Ponce	1500m
Bronze medal – third place	1990 Mexico City	1500m

José Gregorio López Martínez (born 19 June 1967) is a retired Venezuelan middle-distance runner. He represented his country in the 1500 metres at the 1991, 1995 and 1997 World Championships without advancing from the first round.

== International competitions ==
Year	Competition	Venue	Position	Event	Notes
Representing Venezuela
1985	Bolivarian Games	Cuenca, Ecuador	1st	800 m	1:55.4
1985	Bolivarian Games	Cuenca, Ecuador	1st	1500 m	4:06.5
1986	Central American and Caribbean Games	Santiago, Dominican Republic	11th (h)	1500 m	3:56.81^{1}
1988	Ibero-American Championships	Mexico City, Mexico	4th	1500 m	3:53.75
1989	Central American and Caribbean Championships	San Juan, Puerto Rico	2nd	1500 m	3:41.56
1989	South American Championships	Medellín, Colombia	2nd	1500 m	3:47.9
1990	Central American and Caribbean Games	Mexico City, Mexico	3rd	1500 m	3:50.08
1991	Pan American Games	Havana, Cuba	7th (h)	1500 m	3:47.26^{1}
1991	World Championships	Tokyo, Japan	31st (h)	1500 m	3:45.61
1992	Ibero-American Championships	Seville, Spain	4th	1500 m	3:48.47
1993	Central American and Caribbean Games	Ponce, Puerto Rico	1st	1500 m	3:43.89
1994	Ibero-American Championships	Mar del Plata, Argentina	1st	1500 m	3:54.04
1994	South American Games	Valencia, Venezuela	1st	800 m	1:50.53
1994	South American Games	Valencia, Venezuela	1st	1500 m	3:47.56
1995	Pan American Games	Mar del Plata, Argentina	7th	1500 m	3:50.44
1995	Central American and Caribbean Championships	Guatemala City, Guatemala	1st	1500 m	3:50.5
1995	World Championships	Gothenburg, Sweden	29th (h)	1500 m	3:46.81
1997	Central American and Caribbean Championships	San Juan, Puerto Rico	2nd	1500 m	3:47.92
1997	World Championships	Athens, Greece	38th (h)	1500 m	3:42.83
1997	Bolivarian Games	Arequipa, Peru	1st	800 m	1:48.04
1997	Bolivarian Games	Arequipa, Peru	1st	1500 m	3:53.8
1998	Central American and Caribbean Games	Maracaibo, Venezuela	8th	1500 m	3:51.71
1999	Central American and Caribbean Championships	Bridgetown, Barbados	3rd	1500 m	3:48.65

^{1}Did not finish in the final

== Personal bests ==
Outdoor

- 800 meters – 1:48.04 (Arequipa 1997)
- 1500 meters – 3:39.80 (Laguna 1996)
- 3000 meters – 7:52.76 (Seville 1997)
- 5000 meters – 13:44.23 (Walnut 1999)
