= Frank Bicet =

Spanish discus thrower (born 1971)

Frank Vicet
Personal information
- Nationality: Cuban, Spanish
- Born: 30 November 1971 (age 54) Cuba

Sport
- Country: Cuba, Spain

Frank Bicet (born 30. November 1971) is a former discus thrower. Born in Cuba, he represented his country of birth and Spain internationally.

He won the silver medal at the 1990 World Junior Championships, the gold medal at the 1990 Central American and Caribbean Junior Championships, won the gold medal at the 1993 Central American and Caribbean Championships, finished fifth at the 1994 Ibero-American Championships, won the gold medal at the 1995 Central American and Caribbean Championships, and the gold medal at the 1996 Ibero-American Championships.

He later changed his allegiance to Spain. His personal best throw was 61.02 metres, achieved in July 1998 in Havana. Also an able hammer thrower, he recorded 72.15 metres in February 2006 in Havana.
