= Alberto Manzano =

Cuban pole vaulter (born 1972)

Personal information
- Born: 22 September 1972 (age 53)

Sport
- Sport: Track and field
Medal record
Representing Cuba
Pan American Games
Bronze medal – third place	1995 Mar del Plata	Pole vault
Central American and Caribbean Games
Silver medal – second place	1993 Ponce	Pole vault
CAC Junior Championships (U20)
Gold medal – first place	1990 Havana	Pole vault

Alberto Manzano (born 22 September 1972) is a retired Cuban pole vaulter. His personal best jump was 5.45 metres, achieved in July 1990 in Havana.

== Career ==
He won silver medals at the 1993 Central American and Caribbean Games and the 1993 and 1995 Central American and Caribbean Championships, bronze medals at the 1994 IAAF World Cup and the 1995 Pan American Games and a gold medal at the 1997 Central American and Caribbean Championships.

== Achievements ==
Year	Competition	Venue	Position	Event	Notes
Representing Cuba
1990	CAC Junior Championships (U-20)	Havana, Cuba	1st	Pole vault	5.45 m
1990	World Junior Championships	Plovdiv, Bulgaria	5th	Pole vault	5.30 m
1991	Pan American Junior Championships	Kingston, Jamaica	1st	Pole vault	5.00 m
1993	Central American and Caribbean Championships	Cali, Colombia	2nd	Pole vault	5.40 m
1993	Central American and Caribbean Games	Ponce, Puerto Rico	2nd	Pole vault	5.30 m
1995	Central American and Caribbean Championships	Guatemala City, Guatemala	2nd	Pole vault	5.40 m
1995	Pan American Games	Mar del Plata, Argentina	3rd	Pole vault	5.40 m
1996	Ibero-American Championships	Medellín, Colombia	1st	Pole vault	5.55 m CR
1997	Central American and Caribbean Championships	San Juan, Puerto Rico	1st	Pole vault	5.40 m
