= Yosvany Suárez =

Cuban hammer thrower

Personal information
- Full name: Iosvani Suárez Sandoval
- Born: December 20, 1972 (age 53) Los Palacios, Pinar del Río
- Height: 1.81 m (5 ft 11 in)
- Weight: 95 kg (209 lb)

Sport
- Country: Cuba
- Sport: Athletics
Medal record
Men's athletics
Representing Cuba
Pan American Games
Bronze medal – third place	2003 Santo Domingo	Hammer throw
Central American and Caribbean Games
Silver medal – second place	1998 Maracaibo	Hammer throw
Silver medal – second place	2006 Cartagena	Hammer throw
CAC Junior Championships (U20)
Gold medal – first place	1990 Havana	Hammer throw
- Updated on 1 June 2013

Yosvany Suárez Sandoval (or Iosvani Suárez Sandoval, born 20 December 1973) is a retired male hammer thrower from Cuba. His personal best throw is 73.93 metres, achieved in May 2006 in Havana.

== Career ==
He finished thirteenth at the 1992 World Junior Championships, won the silver medal at the 1998 Central American and Caribbean Games, finished ninth at the 2002 IAAF World Cup, won the bronze medal at the 2003 Pan American Games and the silver medal at the 2006 Central American and Caribbean Games. At the Central American and Caribbean Championships he won a silver medal in 1997 and gold medals in 1995, 2003 and 2005. He became Cuban champion in 1999, 2002 and 2003, forming a rivalry with Alberto Sánchez and Yosmel Montes.

== Personal best ==
- Hammer throw: 73.93 m – (Cuba) La Habana, 4 May 2006

== Achievements ==
Year	Competition	Venue	Position	Event	Notes
Representing Cuba
1990	Central American and Caribbean Junior Championships (U-20)	La Habana, Cuba	1st	Hammer	57.54 m
1991	Pan American Junior Championships	Kingston, Jamaica	2nd	Hammer	61.06 m
1992	World Junior Championships	Seoul, South Korea	13th	Hammer	62.06 m
1995	Pan American Games	Mar del Plata, Argentina	4th	Hammer	71.44 m
1995	Central American and Caribbean Championships	Ciudad de Guatemala, Guatemala	1st	Hammer	69.68 m
1996	Ibero-American Championships	Medellín, Colombia	2nd	Hammer	70.54 m
1997	Central American and Caribbean Championships	San Juan, Puerto Rico	2nd	Hammer	69.90 m
1998	Central American and Caribbean Games	Maracaibo, Venezuela	2nd	Hammer	69.35 m
1999	Universiade	Palma, Spain	23rd (q)	Hammer	63.56 m
2002	World Cup	Madrid, Spain	9th	Hammer	66.33 m (Note: Representing the Americas)
2003	Central American and Caribbean Championships	St. George's, Grenada	1st	Hammer	69.59 m
2003	Pan American Games	Santo Domingo, Dominican Republic	3rd	Hammer	70.24 m
2005	ALBA Games	La Habana, Cuba	4th	Hammer	69.96 m
2005	Central American and Caribbean Championships	Nassau, Bahamas	1st	Hammer	69.47 m
2006	Central American and Caribbean Games	Cartagena, Colombia	2nd	Hammer	67.62 m
2007	ALBA Games	Caracas, Venezuela	3rd	Hammer	67.52 m
