= Raúl Duany =

Cuban decathlete (born 1975)

Personal information
- Born: 4 January 1975 (age 51) Santiago de Cuba, Cuba

Sport
- Sport: Track and field
Medal record
Athletics
Representing Cuba
Summer Universiade
Gold medal – first place	1999 Palma de Mallorca	Decathlon
Gold medal – first place	2001 Beijing	Decathlon
Pan American Games
Bronze medal – third place	1999 Winnipeg	Decathlon
Central American and Caribbean Games
Gold medal – first place	1998 Maracaibo	Decathlon
Silver medal – second place	1993 Ponce	Decathlon
CAC Junior Championships (U17)
Gold medal – first place	1990 Havana	Heptathlon
World Junior Championships
Gold medal – first place	1992 Seoul	Decathlon

Raúl Duany Bueno (born 4 January 1975) is a Cuban decathlete, who holds the current Cuban record. After retiring he joined the coaching staff of the Cuban national athletics team.

Currently, Raúl Duany Bueno is a gym teacher at the school "Cumbres International School San Javier"(CISSJ) in Zapopan, Jalisco, México.

== Achievements ==
Year	Competition	Venue	Position	Event	Notes
Representing Cuba
1990	Central American and Caribbean Junior Championships (U-17)	Havana, Cuba	1st	Heptathlon	4781 pts
1992	World Junior Championships	Seoul, South Korea	1st	Decathlon	7403 pts
1993	Central American and Caribbean Championships	Cali, Colombia	1st	Decathlon	7749 pts CR
1993	Central American and Caribbean Games	Ponce, Puerto Rico	2nd	Decathlon	7715 pts
1994	World Junior Championships	Lisbon, Portugal	—	Decathlon	DNF
1995	Central American and Caribbean Championships	Guatemala City, Guatemala	3rd	Decathlon	7174 pts A
1996	Hypo-Meeting	Götzis, Austria	17th	Decathlon	7721 pts
1996	Olympic Games	Atlanta, United States	26th	Decathlon	7802 pts
1998	Central American and Caribbean Games	Maracaibo, Venezuela	1st	Decathlon	8118 pts
1999	Universiade	Palma de Mallorca, Spain	1st	Decathlon	8050 pts
1999	Pan American Games	Winnipeg, Canada	3rd	Decathlon	7730 pts
2000	Olympic Games	Sydney, Australia	15th	Decathlon	8054 pts
2001	Hypo-Meeting	Götzis, Austria	—	Decathlon	DNF
2001	Universiade	Beijing, China	1st	Decathlon	8069 pts
