= Ángel García (pole vaulter) =

Cuban pole vaulter (born 1967)

Ángel García Esteban (born 5 January 1967) is a retired Cuban pole vaulter.

Highly successful on the regional scene, he won the gold medals at the 1989 Central American and Caribbean Championships, the 1990 Central American and Caribbean Games as well as the 1993 and 1995 Central American and Caribbean Championships. He won the bronze medal at the 1991 Pan American Games.

His personal best jump was 5.65 metres, achieved in June 1992 in Havana.
