= Norbi Balantén =

Cuban hammer thrower (born 1972)

Personal information
- Born: June 24, 1972 (age 54)

Sport
- Sport: Track and field
Medal record
Athletics
Representing Cuba
Central American and Caribbean Games
Bronze medal – third place	1998 Maracaibo	Hammer throw
CAC Junior Championships (U20)
Gold medal – first place	1990 Havana	Shot put

Norbi Balantén Puente (born June 24, 1972) is a retired female hammer thrower from Cuba. She set her personal best (65.28 metres) on March 16, 2001, in Victoria de Las Tunas.

== Achievements ==
Year	Competition	Venue	Position	Event	Notes
Representing Cuba
1990	Central American and Caribbean Junior Championships (U-20)	Havana, Cuba	1st	Shot put	15.46 m
1994	Ibero-American Championships	Mar del Plata, Argentina	5th	Hammer throw	47.86 m
1995	Pan American Games	Mar del Plata, Argentina	7th	Hammer throw	50.88 m
1995	Central American and Caribbean Championships	Guatemala City, Guatemala	1st	Hammer throw	52.68 m A CR
1996	Ibero American Championships	Medellin, Colombia	2nd	Hammer throw	53.80 m
1998	Central American and Caribbean Games	Maracaibo, Venezuela	3rd	Hammer throw	57.30 m
1999	Universiade	Palma de Mallorca, Spain	14th (q)	Hammer throw	58.82 m
1999	Pan American Games	Winnipeg, Canada	4th	Hammer throw	60.46 m
