= Yosvany Obregón =

Cuban shot putter (born 1972)

Yosvany Obregón (born 21 June 1972) is a retired Cuban shot putter.

He won the bronze medal at the 1990 Central American and Caribbean Junior Championships, finished seventh at the 1994 Ibero-American Championships, won the silver medal at the 1995 Central American and Caribbean Championships, finished fourth at the 1996 Ibero-American Championships, won the bronze medal at the 1997 Central American and Caribbean Championships, and the silver medal at the 1998 Central American and Caribbean Games. He became Cuban champion in 1996, breaking the winning streak of Carlos Fandiño.

His personal best put was 19.82 metres, achieved in July 2000 in Havana.
