= René Díaz =

Cuban hammer thrower (born 1967)

Personal information
- Born: 13 January 1967 (age 59)

Sport
- Sport: Track and field
Medal record
Representing Cuba
Pan American Games
Bronze medal – third place	1991 Havana	Hammer throw
Central American and Caribbean Games
Bronze medal – third place	1990 Mexico City	Hammer throw

René Díaz Molina (born 13 January 1967) is a retired Cuban hammer thrower.

He won the gold medal at the 1986 Central American and Caribbean Junior Championships, the silver medal at the 1986 Pan American Junior Athletics Championships, the gold medal at the 1989 Central American and Caribbean Championships, the bronze medal at the 1990 Central American and Caribbean Games, and the bronze medal at the 1991 Pan American Games. He became Cuban champion in 1990 and 1991.
