= Miguel Valle =

Cuban decathlete

Personal information
- Born: 29 September 1968 (age 57)

Sport
- Sport: Track and field
Medal record
Representing Cuba
Central American and Caribbean Games
Gold medal – first place	1990 Mexico City	Decathlon

Miguel Valle Álvarez (born 29 September 1968) is a retired Cuban decathlete.

He won the gold medal at the 1986 Central American and Caribbean Junior Championships (in a new games record), the gold medal at the 1986 Pan American Junior Championships, the gold medal at the 1987 Central American and Caribbean Championships (as well as the bronze medal in the long jump), the gold medal at the 1990 Central American and Caribbean Games, finished sixth at the 1991 Pan American Games, and won the silver medal at the 1994 Ibero-American Championships. He also became Cuban champion.
