= Ana López (Cuban sprinter) =

Cuban sprinter

Personal information
- Full name: Ana María Wilianis López García
- Nationality: Cuban
- Born: 28 August 1982 (age 43)

Sport
- Sport: Sprinting
- Event: 4 × 100 metres relay

Ana María Wilianis López García (born 28 August 1982) is a Cuban sprinter. She competed in the women's 4 × 100 metres relay at the 2004 Summer Olympics.
