= José Pérez (hurdler) =

Cuban hurdler

José Roquez Pérez (born 19 March 1971) is a retired Cuban athlete who specialised in the 400 metres hurdles. He represented his country at two World Championships, in 1993 and 1995, reaching the semifinals on both occasion. In addition he won multiple medals on regional level.

His personal best in the event is 49.28 seconds set in Cali in 1993.

== Competition record ==
Year	Competition	Venue	Position	Event	Notes
Representing Cuba
1990	Central American and Caribbean Junior Championships	Havana, Cuba	2nd	110 m hurdles	14.18
1990	World Junior Championships	Plovdiv, Bulgaria	7th	110 m hurdles	14.19
1993	Central American and Caribbean Championships	Cali, Colombia	1st	400 m hurdles	50.00
1993	World Championships	Stuttgart, Germany	13th (sf)	400 m hurdles	49.34
1993	Central American and Caribbean Games	Ponce, Puerto Rico	4th	400 m hurdles	50.51
1994	Goodwill Games	St. Petersburg, Russia	6th	400 m hurdles	49.84
1995	Central American and Caribbean Championships	Guatemala City, Guatemala	1st	400 m hurdles	49.2
1995	World Championships	Gothenburg, Sweden	13th (sf)	400 m hurdles	50.20
1995	World Championships	Gothenburg, Sweden	6th	4 × 400 m relay	3:07.65
1997	Central American and Caribbean Championships	San Juan, Puerto Rico	3rd	400 m hurdles	50.92
