= Aguelmis Rojas =

Cuban long-distance runner

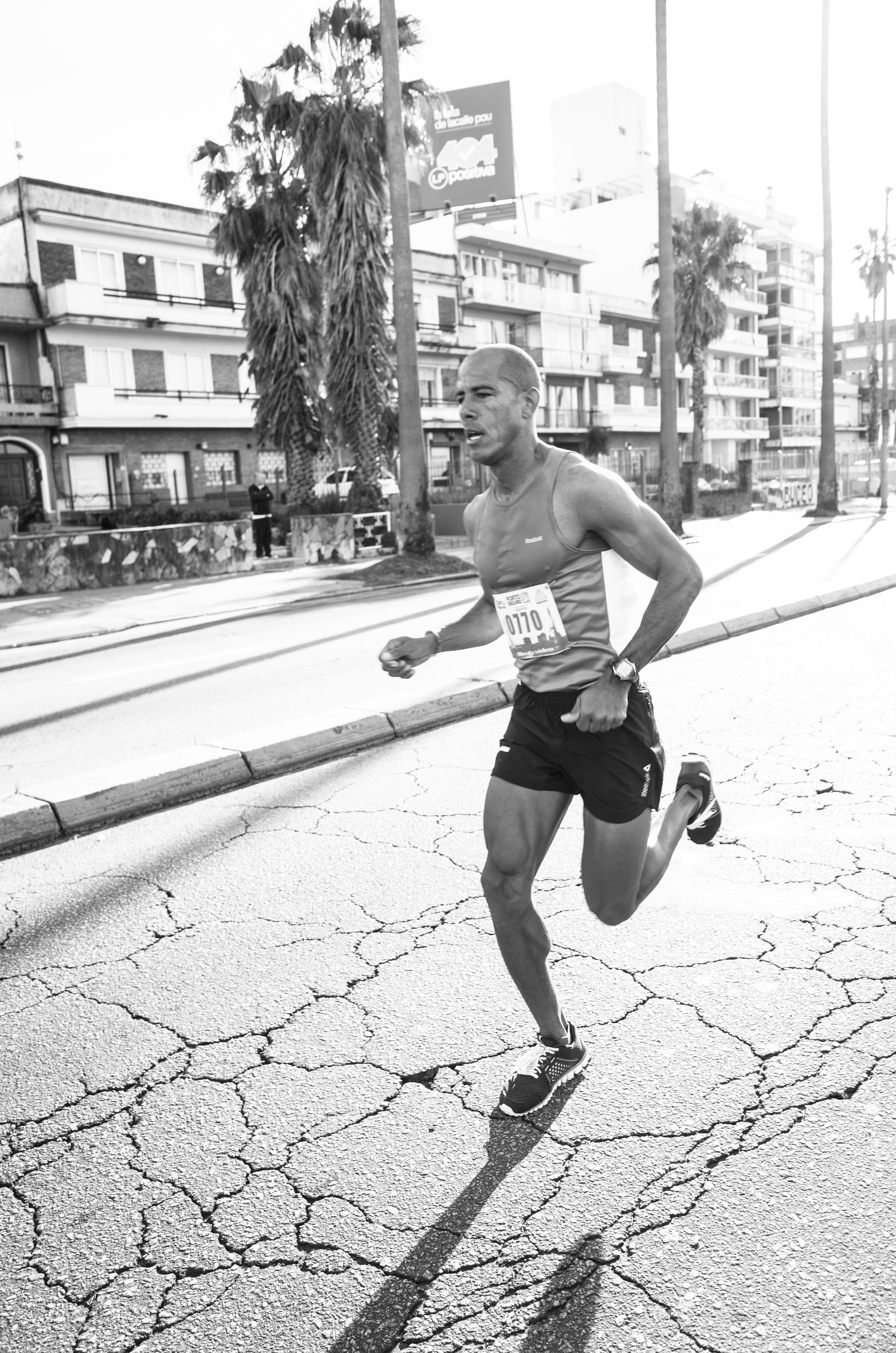
- During the Corré Montevideo 21km run

Personal information
- Full name: Aguelmis Rojas de Armas
- Born: March 28, 1978 (age 48)

Sport
- Country: Cuba
- Sport: Athletics
Medal record
Men's Athletics
Representing Cuba
CAC Championships
Gold medal – first place	2005 Nassau	10,000 metres

Aguelmis Rojas de Armas also Aquelmis Rojas (Spanish pronunciation: [aˈɣelmis ˈroxas]; born March 28, 1978) is a male long-distance runner from Cuba. He represented his native country at the 2004 Summer Olympics in Athens, Greece, where he finished in 47th place in the men's marathon event, clocking 2:21.59. Rojas set his personal best (2:14.15) in the marathon on April 18, 2004, in Havana.

A Cuban exile since March 2009, he was nationalized Uruguayan in August 2014 and is competing for Uruguay since late 2014.

== Biography ==
He finished fourth in the men's marathon at the 2003 Pan American Games. At the 2007 IAAF World Road Running Championships, he set the Cuban record of 1:03:48 for the half marathon, although he finished in 55th place. Aside from road competitions, he occasionally runs on the track and was the winner of the gold medal over 10,000 metres at the 2005 Central American and Caribbean Championships.

== Achievements ==
Year	Competition	Venue	Position	Event	Notes
Representing Cuba
2001	World Half Marathon Championships	Bristol, United Kingdom	52nd	Half marathon	1:04:13 hrs
2003	Pan American Games	Santo Domingo, Dominican Republic	4th	Marathon	2:23:18 hrs
2004	Olympic Games	Athens, Greece	47th	Marathon	2:21:59 hrs
2005	Central American and Caribbean Championships	Nassau, Bahamas	1st	10,000 metres	30:14.75 min
2006	Central American and Caribbean Games	Cartagena, Colombia	5th	Marathon	2:34:00 hrs
2007	ALBA Games	Caracas, Venezuela	2nd	5000 m	14:21.90 min
2007	ALBA Games	Caracas, Venezuela	1st	10,000 m	30:14.33 min
2007	World Half Marathon Championships	Udine, Italy	55th	Half marathon	1:03:48 hrs
2009	Corrida Doble San Antonio	Piriápolis, Uruguay	1st	8,000 m	30:52 min
2009	Reebok 10 km	Montevideo, Uruguay	2nd	10,000 m	30:19 min
2010	Corrida de San Fernando	Maldonado, Uruguay	4th	10,000 m	30:15 min
2010	Reebok 10 km	Montevideo, Uruguay	1st	10,000 m	30:32 min
2010	Corrida Gardeliana	Tacuarembó, Uruguay	1st	Half marathon	1:06:38 hrs
2010	Corrida San Felipe y Santiago	Montevideo, Uruguay	2nd	10,000 m	29:45 min
2011	Corrida de San Fernando	Maldonado, Uruguay	2nd	10,000 m	29:45 min
2011	Corrida Doble San Antonio	Piriápolis, Uruguay	1st	8,000 m	30:48 min
2011	Reebok 10 km	Montevideo, Uruguay	1st	10,000 m	30:07 min
2011	Corrida San Felipe y Santiago	Montevideo, Uruguay	1st	10,000 m	31:19 min
2012	Corrida de San Fernando	Maldonado, Uruguay	1st	10,000 m	29:34 min
2012	Corrida Doble San Antonio	Piriápolis, Uruguay	1st	8,000 m	24:59 min
2012	Media Maratón de Montevideo	Montevideo, Uruguay	2nd	Half marathon	1:06:16 hrs
2012	Reebok 10 km	Montevideo, Uruguay	1st	10,000 m	30:07 min
2012	Nike 10k	Montevideo, Uruguay	2nd	10,000 m	30:59 min
2012	Corrida San Felipe y Santiago	Montevideo, Uruguay	2nd	10,000 m	31:56 min
2013	Corrida de San Fernando	Maldonado, Uruguay	10th	10,000 m	31:37 min
2013	Corrida Doble San Antonio	Piriápolis, Uruguay	3rd	8,000 m	25:15 min
2013	Corré Montevideo	Montevideo, Uruguay	2nd	Half marathon	1:06:05 hrs
2013	Reebok 10 km	Montevideo, Uruguay	2nd	10,000 m	29:50 min
2013	Nike 10k	Montevideo, Uruguay	4th	10,000 m	31:49 min
2013	Corrida San Felipe y Santiago	Montevideo, Uruguay	3rd	10,000 m	29:51 min
2014	Corrida de San Fernando	Maldonado, Uruguay	3rd	10,000 m	30:07 min
2014	Corrida Doble San Antonio	Piriápolis, Uruguay	2nd	8,000 m	25:00 min
2014	Maratón de Montevideo	Montevideo, Uruguay	1st	Marathon	2:19:33 hrs
2014	Corré Montevideo	Montevideo, Uruguay	1st	Half marathon	1:04:55 hrs
2014	Media Maratón de Montevideo	Montevideo, Uruguay	1st	Half marathon	1:06:58 hrs
2014	Reebok 10 km	Montevideo, Uruguay	2nd	10,000 m	29:58 min
