= Jorge Montenegro (shot putter) =

Cuban shot putter

Personal information
- Born: 21 September 1968 (age 57)

Sport
- Sport: Track and field
Medal record
Representing Cuba
Pan American Games
Silver medal – second place	1995 Mar del Plata	Shot put
Central American and Caribbean Games
Gold medal – first place	1993 Ponce	Shot put

Jorge Montenegro (born 21 September 1968) is a retired Cuban shot putter.

He won the gold medal at the 1986 Central American and Caribbean Junior Championships, the gold medal at the 1989 Central American and Caribbean Championships, the bronze medal at the 1993 Central American and Caribbean Championships, the gold medal at the 1993 Central American and Caribbean Games and the silver medal at the 1995 Pan American Games. He became Cuban champion in 1991, 1992 and 1993 in between Paul Ruiz and Carlos Fandiño.

His personal best put was 19.55 metres, achieved in March 1990 in Havana.
