= Eugenio Balanqué =

Cuban decathlete

Personal information
- Born: 20 December 1968 (age 57) Santiago de Cuba, Cuba

Sport
- Sport: Track and field
Medal record
Representing Cuba
Pan American Games
Silver medal – second place	1991 Havana	Decathlon
Silver medal – second place	1995 Mar del Plata	Decathlon
Central American and Caribbean Games
Gold medal – first place	1993 Ponce	Decathlon
Silver medal – second place	1998 Maracaibo	Decathlon

Eugenio Balanqué Llópiz (born 20 December 1968) is a retired Cuban decathlete. He won the 1993 Central American and Caribbean Games and took silver medals at the 1991 Pan American Games, the 1995 Pan American Games and the 1998 Central American and Caribbean Games. He also participated at the 1996 and 2000 Summer Olympics.

== Achievements ==
Year	Competition	Venue	Position	Event
Representing Cuba
1991	Pan American Games	Havana, Cuba	2nd	Decathlon
1993	Central American and Caribbean Championships	Cali, Colombia	2nd	Decathlon
1993	Central American and Caribbean Games	Ponce, Puerto Rico	1st	Decathlon
1995	Pan American Games	Mar del Plata, Argentina	2nd	Decathlon
1995	Central American and Caribbean Championships	Guatemala City, Guatemala	1st	Decathlon
1996	Hypo-Meeting	Götzis, Austria	13th	Decathlon
1996	Olympic Games	Atlanta, Georgia, United States	25th	Decathlon
1997	Central American and Caribbean Championships	San Juan, Puerto Rico	1st	Decathlon
1998	Central American and Caribbean Games	Maracaibo, Venezuela	2nd	Decathlon
1999	Pan American Games	Winnipeg, Canada	4th	Decathlon
2000	Olympic Games	Sydney, Australia	DNF	Decathlon
2002	Hypo-Meeting	Götzis, Austria	9th	Decathlon
