= Juan Miguel López =

Cuban triple jumper (born 1967)

Personal information
- Born: 7 April 1967 (age 59)

Sport
- Sport: Track and field
Medal record
Representing Cuba
World Indoor Championships
Bronze medal – third place	1989 Budapest	Triple jump
Central American and Caribbean Games
Silver medal – second place	1990 Mexico City	Triple jump

Juan Miguel López Varga (born 7 April 1967) is a Cuban former track and field athlete who specialised in the triple jump.

He won bronze at the 1989 IAAF World Indoor Championships, silver at the 1989 Central American and Caribbean Championships and silver at the 1990 Central American and Caribbean Games.

He won a silver medal at the 1986 World Junior Championships in Athletics, but was subsequently disqualified for doping.

== See also ==
- List of doping cases in athletics
