= Maribel Durruty =

Cuban long-distance runner

Personal information
- Full name: Maribel Durruty Medina
- Born: 17 May 1964 Mayabeque, Cuba

Sport
- Sport: Athletics
- Event: Marathon
Medal record
Representing Cuba
Pan American Games
Silver medal – second place	1991 Havana	Marathon
Bronze medal – third place	1987 Indianapolis	Marathon
Central American and Caribbean Games
Silver medal – second place	1986 Santiago	Marathon
Bronze medal – third place	1986 Santiago	10,000m
Bronze medal – third place	1990 Mexico City	Marathon

Maribel Durruty Medina (born 17 May 1964) is a retired Cuban long-distance runner who specialised in the Marathon. She is best known for winning the bronze medal at the 1987 Pan American Games.

== International competitions ==
Year	Competition	Venue	Position	Event	Notes
Representing Cuba
1986	Central American and Caribbean Games	Santiago, Dominican Republic	3rd	10,000 m	38:20.27
1986	Central American and Caribbean Games	Santiago, Dominican Republic	2nd	Marathon	3:08:57
1987	Pan American Games	Indianapolis, United States	3rd	Marathon	2:56:21
1988	Ibero-American Championships	Mexico City, Mexico	3rd	Marathon	3:08:00
1989	Central American and Caribbean Championships	San Juan, Puerto Rico	2nd	10,000 m	35:27.70
1990	Central American and Caribbean Games	Mexico City, Mexico	3rd	Marathon	2:50:41
1991	World Marathon Cup	London, United Kingdom	66th	Marathon	2:47:05
1991	Pan American Games	Havana, Cuba	2nd	Marathon	2:46:04
1991	New York City Marathon	New York City, United States	15th	Marathon	2:49:47
1995	Pan American Games	Mar del Plata, Argentina	5th	Marathon	2:50:25
1998	Central American and Caribbean Games	Maracaibo, Venezuela	–	Marathon	DNF

== Personal bests ==
- Half marathon – 1:22:02 (Havana 1998)
- Marathon – 2:43:39 (Havana 1989)
