= Central American and Caribbean Championships in Athletics =

International track and field athletics event

The Central American and Caribbean (CAC) Championships was an international track and field athletics event organised by the Central American and Caribbean Athletic Confederation (CACAC), held once every two years from 1967 to 2013. Only athletes representing a member nation of the confederation were permitted to compete. Started in 1967, the event was held every two years except for the 2007 edition which was held in 2008 instead.

After 24 editions it was replaced with the NACAC Championships, beginning in 2015.

== Editions ==
An overview of the early editions of the championships together with a list of the top three performing countries and the outstanding athletes was published.

| Edition | Year | City | Country | Date | Venue | No. of events | No. of countries | No. of athletes | Top nation |
|---|---|---|---|---|---|---|---|---|---|
| 1 | 1967 | Xalapa | Mexico | 5–7 May | Estadio Heriberto Jara Corona | 35 | | | Cuba |
| 2 | 1969 | Havana | Cuba | 17–19 August | Estadio Juan Abrantes | 35 | | | Cuba |
| 3 | 1971 | Kingston | Jamaica | 14–17 July | National Stadium | 38 | | | Cuba |
| 4 | 1973 | Maracaibo | Venezuela | 26–29 July | Estadio José Pachencho Romero | 37 | | | Cuba |
| 5 | 1975 | Ponce | Puerto Rico | 6–10 August | Estadio Paquito Montaner | 33 | | | Cuba |
| 6 | 1977 | Xalapa | Mexico | 5–7 August | Estadio Heriberto Jara Corona | 38 | | | Cuba |
| 7 | 1979 | Guadalajara | Mexico | 15–17 June | Estadio Revolución | 39 | | | Cuba |
| 8 | 1981 | Santo Domingo | Dominican Republic | 10–12 July | Estadio Juan Pablo Duarte | 39 | | | Cuba |
| 9 | 1983 | Havana | Cuba | 22–24 July | Estadio Pedro Marrero | 40 | | | Cuba |
| 10 | 1985 | Nassau | Bahamas | 25–27 July | Thomas Robinson Stadium | 41 | | | Cuba |
| 11 | 1987 | Caracas | Venezuela | 24–26 July | Estadio Olímpico | 40 | | | Cuba |
| 12 | 1989 | San Juan | Puerto Rico | 27–29 July | Estadio Sixto Escobar | 41 | | | Cuba |
| 13 | 1991 | Xalapa | Mexico | 26–28 July | Estadio Heriberto Jara Corona | 40 | | | Mexico |
| 14 | 1993 | Cali | Colombia | 30 July - 1 August | Estadio Pascual Guerrero | 43 | | | Cuba |
| 15 | 1995 | Guatemala City | Guatemala | 14–16 July | Estadio La Pedrera | 44 | | | Cuba |
| 16 | 1997 | San Juan | Puerto Rico | 26–28 June | Estadio Sixto Escobar | 45 | | | Cuba |
| 17 | 1999 | Bridgetown | Barbados | 25–27 June | Barbados National Stadium | 39 | | | Jamaica |
| 18 | 2001 | Guatemala City | Guatemala | 20–22 July | Estadio Mateo Flores | 45 | | | Cuba |
| 19 | 2003 | St. George's | Grenada | 4–6 July | National Stadium | | | | Mexico |
| 20 | 2005 | Nassau | Bahamas | 8–11 July | Thomas Robinson Stadium | 44 | 29 | 374 | Cuba |
| 21 | 2008 | Cali | Colombia | 4–6 July | Estadio Pedro Grajales | 44 | 30 | 383 | Cuba |
| 22 | 2009 | Havana | Cuba | 3–7 July | Estadio Panamericano | 46 | 27 | 420 | Cuba |
| 23 | 2011 | Mayagüez | Puerto Rico | 15–17 July | Estadio Jose Antonio Figueroa | 46 | 35 | 449 | Jamaica |
| 24 | 2013 | Morelia | Mexico | 5–7 July | Estadio Venustiano Carranza | 44 | 28 | 338 | Mexico |

== Medals (1967-2013) ==
| Rank | Nation | Gold | Silver | Bronze | Total |
|---|---|---|---|---|---|
| 1 | Cuba | 413 | 302 | 170 | 885 |
| 2 | Mexico | 154 | 177 | 147 | 478 |
| 3 | Jamaica | 133 | 118 | 85 | 336 |
| 4 | Bahamas | 50 | 43 | 64 | 157 |
| 5 | Puerto Rico | 44 | 85 | 100 | 229 |
| 6 | Colombia | 36 | 44 | 57 | 137 |
| 7 | Trinidad and Tobago | 33 | 28 | 47 | 108 |
| 8 | Venezuela | 20 | 49 | 83 | 152 |
| 9 | Barbados | 18 | 16 | 28 | 62 |
| 10 | Dominican Republic | 9 | 27 | 35 | 71 |
| 11 | Saint Lucia | 9 | 3 | 3 | 15 |
| 12 | Guatemala | 8 | 11 | 31 | 50 |
| 13 | Bermuda | 6 | 17 | 14 | 37 |
| 14 | Saint Kitts and Nevis | 6 | 3 | 4 | 13 |
| 15 | Grenada | 5 | 5 | 3 | 13 |
| 16 | Cayman Islands | 5 | 3 | 1 | 9 |
| 17 | El Salvador | 5 | 2 | 8 | 15 |
| 18 | Costa Rica | 4 | 4 | 9 | 17 |
| 19 | Dominica | 3 | 3 | 4 | 10 |
| 20 | Saint Vincent and the Grenadines | 3 | 2 | 6 | 11 |
| 21 | Antigua and Barbuda | 2 | 6 | 6 | 14 |
| 22 | Haiti | 2 | 3 | 5 | 10 |
| 23 | Guyana | 2 | 3 | 4 | 9 |
| 24 | U.S. Virgin Islands | 2 | 1 | 1 | 4 |
| 25 | French Guiana | 2 | 0 | 0 | 2 |
| 26 | Panama | 1 | 4 | 14 | 19 |
| 27 | British Virgin Islands | 1 | 1 | 4 | 6 |
| 27 | Martinique | 1 | 1 | 4 | 6 |
| 29 | Anguilla | 1 | 1 | 0 | 2 |
| 30 | Nicaragua | 0 | 3 | 3 | 6 |
| 31 | Netherlands Antilles | 0 | 1 | 6 | 7 |
| 32 | Suriname | 0 | 1 | 3 | 4 |
| 33 | Guadeloupe | 0 | 1 | 0 | 1 |
| Totals (33 entries) | | 978 | 968 | 949 | 2,895 |

== See also ==
- List of Central American and Caribbean Championships records
- Central American and Caribbean Swimming Championships
- CARIFTA Games
