= Kirk Cummins =

Barbadian sprinter

Kirk Dwight Cummins (born 8 November 1972) is a former Barbadian sprinter who competed in the men's 100m competition at the 1996 Summer Olympics. He recorded a 10.33 in his first heat, enough to qualify for the next round past the heats. He ran a 10.45 in the quarterfinals, ending his stay in the competition. His personal best is 10.25, set in 1996.
