= Alexis Paumier =

Cuban shot putter

Personal information
- Full name: Alexis Francisco Paumier Frómeta
- Born: January 21, 1975 (age 51) Baracoa, Guantánamo
- Height: 1.93 m (6 ft 4 in)
- Weight: 97 kg (214 lb)

Sport
- Country: Cuba
- Sport: Athletics
- Updated on 22 May 2013

Alexis Paumier Frómeta (born 21 January 1975 in Baracoa, Guantánamo) is a Cuban shot putter. His personal best throw is 20.78 metres, achieved in July 2000 in Havana.

== Career ==
He won the silver medals at the 2001 and 2005 Central American and Caribbean Championships and the 2006 Central American and Caribbean Games. He also competed at the Olympic Games in 2000 and 2008 without reaching the final.

== Personal best ==
- Shot put: 20.78 m – (Cuba) La Habana, 29 July 2000
- Discus throw: 53.80 – (Cuba) La Habana, 15 April 2003

== Competition record ==
Year	Competition	Venue	Position	Event	Notes
Representing Cuba
1993	Pan American Junior Championships	Winnipeg, Canada	4th	Shot put (7.257 kg, senior implement)	14.98 m
1994	World Junior Championships	Lisbon, Portugal	9th	Discus throw (2 kg, senior implement)	51.60 m
2000	Olympic Games	Sydney, Australia	34th (q)	Shot put	18.31 m
2001	World Indoor Championships	Lisbon, Portugal	–	Shot put	NM
2001	Central American and Caribbean Championships	Guatemala City, Guatemala	2nd	Shot put	18.66 m A
2003	Pan American Games	Santo Domingo, Dominican Republic	5th	Shot put	19.32 m
2004	World Indoor Championships	Budapest, Hungary	–	Shot put	NM
2005	ALBA Games	La Habana, Cuba	1st	Shot put	19.23 m
2005	Central American and Caribbean Championships	Nassau, Bahamas	2nd	Shot put	19.06 m
2006	Central American and Caribbean Games	Cartagena, Colombia	1st	Shot put	18.26 m
2006	Central American and Caribbean Games	Cartagena, Colombia	–	Discus throw	NM
2007	ALBA Games	Caracas, Venezuela	2nd	Shot put	19.26 m
2007	Pan American Games	Rio de Janeiro, Brazil	7th	Shot put	18.47 m
2008	Central American and Caribbean Championships	Cali, Colombia	1st	Shot put	19.60 m A
2008	Olympic Games	Beijing, China	–	Shot put	NM
