= Mariela González =

Cuban long-distance runner

Personal information
- Full name: Mariela González Torres
- Born: 5 April 1974 (age 52) Río Cauto, Granma
- Height: 1.58 m (5 ft 2 in)
- Weight: 52 kg (115 lb)

Sport
- Country: Cuba
- Sport: Athletics
Medal record
Pan American Games
Gold medal – first place	2007 Rio de Janeiro	Marathon
Silver medal – second place	2003 Santo Domingo	Marathon
- Updated on 11 June 2013

Mariela González Torres (born 5 April 1974) is a female marathon runner from Cuba, who won the gold medal in the women's marathon at the 2007 Pan American Games. She represented her native country at the 2004 Summer Olympics in Athens, Greece, finishing in 59th place.

== Career ==
She won the 2000 edition of the Havana International Marathon and went on to take the half marathon gold medal at the 2001 Central American and Caribbean Championships in Athletics. She won the Madrid Marathon twice consecutively in 2001 and 2002. She took the silver medal in the marathon at the 2003 Pan American Games, finishing behind Márcia Narloch of Brazil. She set a championship record of 2:36.51 at the second National Cuban Olympics. With the half marathon removed from the programme, she entered the 10,000 metres at the 2005 CAC Championships and was the runner-up behind compatriot Yudelkis Martínez.

== Personal best ==
- 3000 m: 9:38.8 min (ht) – (Cuba) La Habana, 16 April 1997
- 5000 m: 16:12.63 min – (Cuba) La Habana, 10 March 2002
- 10,000 m: 33:48.33 min – (Cuba) La Habana, 8 March 2002
- Half marathon: 1:14:16 hrs – (Cuba) La Habana, 17 February 2007
- Marathon: 2:36:52 hrs – (Cuba) La Habana, 18 April 2004

== Achievements ==
Year	Competition	Venue	Position	Event	Notes
Representing Cuba
1993	Pan American Junior Championships	Winnipeg, Canada	3rd	10,000 metres	36:12.65 min
1999	Pan American Games	Winnipeg, Canada	8th	10,000 m	34:45.94 min
2001	Central American and Caribbean Championships	Guatemala City, Guatemala	1st	Half marathon	1:18:33 hrs A
2001	World Half Marathon Championships	Bristol, United Kingdom	51st	Half marathon	1:16:24 hrs
2003	Pan American Games	Santo Domingo, Dominican Republic	2nd	Marathon	2:42:55 hrs
2004	Olympic Games	Athens, Greece	59th	Marathon	3:02:20 hrs
2005	ALBA Games	La Habana, Cuba	2nd	Half marathon	1:17:50 min
2005	Central American and Caribbean Championships	Nassau, Bahamas	2nd	10,000 m	35:09.62 min
2006	Central American and Caribbean Games	Cartagena, Colombia	–	Marathon	DNF
2007	ALBA Games	Caracas, Venezuela	1st	Half marathon	1:17:53 hrs
2007	Pan American Games	Rio de Janeiro, Brazil	1st	Marathon	2:43:11 hrs
