= Eladio Hernández =

Cuban hammer thrower

Personal information
- Born: 18 February 1963 (age 63)

Sport
- Sport: Track and field
Medal record
Representing Cuba
Central American and Caribbean Games
Gold medal – first place	1990 Mexico City	Hammer throw
Silver medal – second place	1986 Santiago	Hammer throw
Silver medal – second place	1993 Ponce	Hamme throw

Eladio Hernández Yañez (born 18 February 1963) is a retired Cuban hammer thrower.

He won the silver medal at the 1986 Central American and Caribbean Games, the silver medal at the 1987 Central American and Caribbean Championships, finished fifth at the 1989 World Cup, won the gold medal at the 1990 Central American and Caribbean Games, the gold medal at the 1992 Ibero-American Championships, the silver medal at the 1993 Central American and Caribbean Games, the bronze medal at the 1993 Central American and Caribbean Championships, the silver medal at the 1994 Ibero-American Championships and the silver medal at the 1995 Central American and Caribbean Championships. He became Cuban champion in 1988, 1989 and 1992.

His personal best throw was 73.44 metres, achieved in March 1993 in Havana.
