= Yesenia Centeno =

Spanish marathon runner (born 1971)

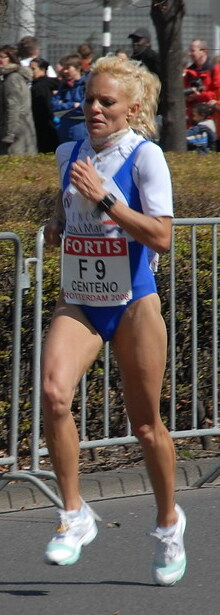
- Centeno in the 2008 Rotterdam Marathon

Personal information
- Full name: Yesenia Centeno Sousa
- Nationality: Cuban, Spanish
- Born: 27 June 1971 (age 55) Ciego de Ávila, Cuba
- Height: 1.57 m (5 ft 2 in)
- Weight: 47 kg (104 lb)

Sport
- Sport: Athletics
- Event: Marathon
- Club: CA Valencia Terra i Mar
- Coached by: Guillermo Ferrero

Achievements and titles
- Personal best: Marathon: 2:31:16 (2008)

Yesenia Centeno Sousa (born 27 June 1971) is a marathon runner. Born in Cuba, she represents Spain internationally. In 2003, she adopted Spanish nationality in order to compete internationally for the marathon. Five years later, she achieved a top-ten finish at the Fortis Rotterdam Marathon, and also, set her personal best time of 2:31:16 by finishing fourth at the Hamburg Marathon.

At age thirty-seven, Centeno made her official debut for the 2008 Summer Olympics in Beijing, where she competed in the women's marathon, along with her compatriots Alessandra Aguilar and María José Pueyo. She finished the race in forty-fifth place by less than a second ahead of Portugal's Ana Dias, with a time of 2:36:25.

Centeno is a member of Club Atletico Valencia Terra i Mar in Valencia, Spain, being coached and trained by Guillermo Ferrero.

In 2009, she tested positive for illegal substances, Methandriol and Furosemide, and was subsequently disqualified for two years.

== See also ==
- List of eligibility transfers in athletics
