= Alberto Cuba =

Cuban long-distance runner

Personal information
- Born: July 31, 1962 (age 63) Santa Clara, Cuba

Sport
- Sport: Track and field
Medal record
Representing Cuba
Pan American Games
Gold medal – first place	1991 Havana	Marathon

Ignacio Alberto Cuba Carrero (born July 31, 1962) is a former marathon runner from Cuba. He won the gold medal at the 1991 Pan American Games and competed for his native country at the 1992 Summer Olympics, where he didn't finish the race.

== Achievements ==
- All results regarding marathon, unless stated otherwise

Year	Competition	Venue	Position	Event	Notes
Representing Cuba
1986	Central American and Caribbean Games	Santiago, Dominican Republic	4th	5000 m	14:51.06
1986	Central American and Caribbean Games	Santiago, Dominican Republic	5th	10,000 m	30:49.55
1986	Ibero-American Championships	La Habana, Cuba	—	5000 m	DNF
1986	Ibero-American Championships	La Habana, Cuba	5th	10,000 m	30:42.23
1991	Pan American Games	Havana, Cuba	1st	Marathon	2:19:27
1991	World Championships	Tokyo, Japan	30th	Marathon	2:32:57
1992	Olympic Games	Barcelona, Spain	—	Marathon	DNF
1992	Mérida Marathon	Mérida, Yucatán	1st	Marathon	2:10:53
1993	World Championships	Stuttgart, Germany	39th	Marathon	2:34:26
1993	Central American and Caribbean Games	Ponce, Puerto Rico	4th	Marathon	2:18:10
1997	Madrid Marathon	Madrid, Spain	1st	Marathon	2:16:01
1998	Central American and Caribbean Games	Maracaibo, Venezuela	9th	Marathon	2:57:35
