= 1994 IAAF World Cup – Results =

These are the full results of the 1994 IAAF World Cup which was held on 9, 10 and 11 September 1994 at the Crystal Palace National Sports Centre in London, England.

== Results ==
=== 100 m ===
==== Men ====
9 September
Wind: -0.3 m/s

Rank	Athlete	Team	Time	Points	Notes
1	Linford Christie	Great Britain	10.21	8	
2	Olapade Adeniken (NGR)	Africa	10.25	7	
3	Talal Mansoor (QAT)	Asia	10.31	6	
4	Aleksandr Porkhomovskiy (RUS)	Europe	10.40	5	
5	Gus Nketia (NZL)	Oceania	10.42	4	
6	André da Silva (BRA)	Americas	10.49	3	
7	Marc Blume	Germany	10.52	2	
8	Vincent Henderson	United States	10.63	1	

==== Women ====
10 September
Wind: -1.7 m/s

Rank	Athlete	Team	Time	Points	Notes
1	Irina Privalova (RUS)	Europe	11.32	8	
2	Liliana Allen (CUB)	Americas	11.50	7	
3	Mary Onyali (NGR)	Africa	11.52	6	
4	Melinda Gainsford (AUS)	Oceania	11.55	5	
5	Melanie Paschke	Germany	11.64	4	
6	Liu Xiaomei (CHN)	Asia	11.66	3	
7	Paula Thomas	Great Britain	11.67	2	
8	Sheila Echols	United States	11.81	1	

=== 200 m ===
==== Men ====
11 September
Wind: -1.4 m/s

Rank	Athlete	Team	Time	Points	Notes
1	John Regis	Great Britain	20.45	8	
2	Frankie Fredericks (NAM)	Africa	20.55	7	
3	Geir Moen (NOR)	Europe	20.72	6	
4	Ron Clark	United States	21.00	5	
5	Robert Kurnicki	Germany	21.02	4	
6	Damien Marsh (AUS)	Oceania	21.10	2.5	
6	Iván García (CUB)	Americas	21.10	2.5	
8	Huang Danwei (CHN)	Asia	21.23	1	

==== Women ====
9 September
Wind: -1.7 m/s

Rank	Athlete	Team	Time	Points	Notes
1	Merlene Ottey (JAM)	Americas	22.23	8	
2	Irina Privalova (RUS)	Europe	22.51	7	
3	Cathy Freeman (AUS)	Oceania	22.72	6	
4	Mary Onyali (NGR)	Africa	22.82	5	
5	Chen Zhaojing (CHN)	Asia	23.20	4	
6	Paula Thomas	Great Britain	23.22	3	
7	Melanie Paschke	Germany	23.32	2	
8	Chryste Gaines	United States	24.21	1	

=== 400 m ===
==== Men ====
10 September

Rank	Athlete	Team	Time	Points	Notes
1	Antonio Pettigrew	United States	45.26	8	
2	Du'aine Ladejo	Great Britain	45.44	7	
3	Inaldo Sena (BRA)	Americas	45.44	6	
4	Ibrahim Ismail Muftah (QAT)	Asia	45.74	5	
5	Matthias Rusterholz (SUI)	Europe	45.92	4	
6	Samson Kitur (KEN)	Africa	45.98	3	
7	Paul Greene (AUS)	Oceania	46.29	2	
8	Daniel Bittner	Germany	46.73	1	

==== Women ====
11 September

Rank	Athlete	Team	Time	Points	Notes
1	Irina Privalova (RUS)	Europe	50.62	8	
2	Fatima Yusuf (NGR)	Africa	50.80	7	
3	Jearl Miles	United States	51.24	6	
4	Phylis Smith	Great Britain	51.36	5	
5	Julia Duporty (CUB)	Americas	52.48	4	
6	Zhang Hengyun (CHN)	Asia	52.79	3	
7	Kylie Hanigan (AUS)	Oceania	53.82	2	
8	Anja Rücker	Germany	54.21	1	

=== 800 m ===
==== Men ====
9 September

Rank	Athlete	Team	Time	Points	Notes
1	Mark Everett	United States	1:46.02	8	
2	William Tanui (KEN)	Africa	1:46.84	7	
3	Craig Winrow	Great Britain	1:47.16	6	
4	Brendan Hanigan (AUS)	Oceania	1:47.41	5	
5	Nico Motchebon	Germany	1:47.67	4	
6	Tomás de Teresa (ESP)	Europe	1:48.04	3	
7	José Luíz Barbosa (BRA)	Americas	1:48.26	2	
8	Kim Yong-hwan (KOR)	Asia	1:51.88	1	

==== Women ====
10 September

Rank	Athlete	Team	Time	Points	Notes
1	Maria Mutola (MOZ)	Africa	1:58.27	8	
2	Luciana Mendes (BRA)	Americas	2:00.13	7	
3	Natalya Dukhnova (BLR)	Europe	2:02.81	6	
4	Kati Kovacs	Germany	2:03.32	5	
5	Joetta Clark	United States	2:03.76	4	
6	Lisa Lightfoot (AUS)	Oceania	2:03.88	3	
7	Cathy Dawson	Great Britain	2:04.13	2	
8	Chen Xuehui (CHN)	Asia	2:09.82	1	

=== 1500 m ===
==== Men ====
10 September

Rank	Athlete	Team	Time	Points	Notes
1	Noureddine Morceli (ALG)	Africa	3:34.70	8	
2	Rüdiger Stenzel	Germany	3:40.04	7	
3	Mohamed Suleiman (QAT)	Asia	3:40.52	6	
4	Jason Pyrah	United States	3:41.55	5	
5	Gary Lough	Great Britain	3:44.10	4	
6	José Valente (BRA)	Americas	3:44.32	3	
7	Isaac Viciosa (ESP)	Europe	3:47.22	2	
8	Richard Potts (NZL)	Oceania	3:54.09	1	

==== Women ====
9 September

Rank	Athlete	Team	Time	Points	Notes
1	Hassiba Boulmerka (ALG)	Africa	4:01.05	8	
2	Angela Chalmers (CAN)	America	4:01.73	7	
3	Kelly Holmes	Great Britain	4:10.81	6	
4	Margaret Leaney (AUS)	Oceania	4:12.16	5	
5	Sonia O'Sullivan (IRL)	Europe	4:12.30	4	
6	Kathleen Franey	United States	4:21.48	3	
7	Antje Beggerow	Germany	4:23.65	2	
8	Li Ying (CHN)	Asia	4:34.02	1	

=== 5000 m/3000 m ===
==== Men ====
11 September

Rank	Athlete	Team	Time	Points	Notes
1	Brahim Lahlafi (MAR)	Africa	13:27.96	8	
2	John Nuttall	Great Britain	13:32.47	7	
3	Martin Bremer	Germany	13:33.57	6	
4	Robbie Johnston (NZL)	Oceania	13:37.13	5	
5	Bahadur Prasad (IND)	Asia	13:37.20	4	
6	Gabino Apolonio (MEX)	Americas	13:51.73	3	
7	Abel Antón (ESP)	Europe	13:51.73	2	
8	Daniel Mayer	United States	14:07.65	1	

==== Women ====
11 September

Rank	Athlete	Team	Time	Points	Notes
1	Yvonne Murray	Great Britain	8:56.81	8	
2	Robyn Meagher (CAN)	Americas	9:05.81	7	
3	Gabriela Szabo (ROM)	Europe	9:15.16	6	
4	Liu Jianying (CHN)	Asia	9:15.39	5	
5	Susie Power (AUS)	Oceania	9:16.01	4	
6	Dörte Köster	Germany	9:23.32	3	
7	Cassie McWilliam	United States	9:26.50	2	
8	Gwen Griffiths (RSA)	Africa	9:31.91	1	

=== 10,000 m ===
==== Men ====
9 September

Rank	Athlete	Team	Time	Points	Notes
1	Khalid Skah (MAR)	Africa	27:38.74	8	
2	Antonio Silio (ARG)	Americas	28:16.54	7	
3	Robert Denmark	Great Britain	28:20.65	6	
4	Stéphane Franke	Germany	28:32.07	5	
5	Alyan Al-Qahtani (KSA)	Asia	28:41.21	4	
6	Róbert Štefko (SVK)	Europe	28:45.32	3	
7	Phillip Clode (NZL)	Oceania	29:19.87	2	
8	Jim Westpahl	United States	29:22.39	1	

==== Women ====
10 September

Rank	Athlete	Team	Time	Points	Notes
1	Elana Meyer (RSA)	Africa	30:52.51	8	
2	Fernanda Ribeiro (POR)	Europe	31:04.25	7	
3	Wei Li (CHN)	Asia	32:37.94	6	
4	Claudia Dreher	Germany	33:04.79	5	
5	Suzanne Rigg	Great Britain	33:38.14	4	
6	Anne Cross (AUS)	Oceania	33:40.75	3	
7	Laura Lamena-Coll	United States	33:43.66	2	
8	Paola Cabrera (AUS)	Americas	34:41.22	1	

=== 110/100 m hurdles ===
==== Men ====
11 September
Wind: -0.3 m/s

Rank	Athlete	Team	Time	Points	Notes
1	Tony Jarrett	Great Britain	13.23	8	
2	Allen Johnson	United States	13.29	7	
3	Emilio Valle (CUB)	Americas	13.45	6	
4	Florian Schwarthoff	Germany	13.47	5	
5	Li Tong (CHN)	Asia	13.59	4	
6	Kyle Vander-Kuyp (AUS)	Oceania	13.71	3	
7	Kehinde Aladefa (NGR)	Africa	14.03	2	
8	Antti Haapakoski (FIN)	Europe	14.11	1	

==== Women ====
10 September
Wind: -0.9 m/s

Rank	Athlete	Team	Time	Points	Notes
1	Aliuska López (CUB)	Americas	12.91	8	
2	Svetla Dimitrova (BUL)	Europe	12.95	7	
3	Jacqui Agyepong	Great Britain	13.02	6	
4	Nicole Ramalalanirina (MAD)	Africa	13.24	5	
5	Kerstin Patzwahl	Germany	13.68	4	
6	Luo Bin (CHN)	Asia	13.89	3	
7	Sherlese Taylor	United States	14.10	2	
8	Rachel Links (AUS)	Oceania	14.14	1	

=== 400 m hurdles ===
==== Men ====
9 September

Rank	Athlete	Team	Time	Points	Notes
1	Samuel Matete (ZAM)	Africa	48.77	8	
2	Oleh Tverdokhlib (UKR)	Europe	49.26	7	
3	Eronilde de Araújo (BRA)	Americas	49.62	6	
4	Olaf Hense	Germany	49.97	5	
5	Kazuhiko Yamazaki (JPN)	Asia	50.22	4	
6	Gary Cadogan	Great Britain	50.48	3	
7	Rohan Robinson (AUS)	Oceania	51.12	2	
8	Marco Morgan	United States	53.58	1	

==== Women ====
9 September

Rank	Athlete	Team	Time	Points	Notes
1	Sally Gunnell	Great Britain	54.80	8	
2	Silvia Rieger	Germany	56.14	7	
3	Anna Knoroz (RUS)	Europe	56.63	6	
4	Donalda Duprey (CAN)	Americas	56.67	5	
5	Nezha Bidouane (MAR)	Africa	57.35	4	
6	Natalya Torshina (KAZ)	Asia	57.60	3	
7	Tonya Lee	United States	59.61	2	
8	Rebecca Campbell (AUS)	Oceania	1:00.96	1	

=== 3000 m steeplechase ===
==== Men ====
9 September

Rank	Athlete	Team	Time	Points	Notes
1	Moses Kiptanui (KEN)	Africa	8:28.28	8	
2	Saad Al-Asmari (KSA)	Asia	8:35.74	7	
3	Alessandro Lambruschini (ITA)	Europe	8:40.34	6	
4	Colin Walker	Great Britain	8:41.14	5	
5	Martin Strege	Germany	8:45.18	4	
6	Ricardo Vera (URU)	Americas	8:58.80	3	
7	Dan Reese	United States	9:15.16	2	
8	Peter Brett (AUS)	Oceania	9:19.11	1	

=== 4 × 100 m relay ===
==== Men ====
10 September

Rank	Team	Athletes	Time	Points	Notes
1	Great Britain	Darren Braithwaite, Tony Jarrett, John Regis, Linford Christie	38.46	8	
2	Africa	Frank Nwankpa (NGR), Emmanuel Tuffour (GHA), Oluyemi Kayode (NGR), Olapade Adeniken (NGR)	38.97	7	
3	United States	Mark Witherspoon, Roland McGhee, Marcel Carter, Sam Jefferson	39.33	6	
4	Americas	André da Silva (BRA), Atlee Mahorn (CAN), Arnaldo da Silva (BRA), Robson da Silva (BRA)	39.39	5	
5	Europe	Hermann Lomba (FRA), Daniel Sangouma (FRA), Jean-Charles Trouabal (FRA), Éric Perrot (FRA)	39.46	4	
6	Asia	Li Tao (CHN), Lin Wei (CHN), Ye Hu (CHN), Chen Wenzhong (CHN)	55.58	3	
	Germany	Marc Blume, Robert Kurnicki, Michael Huke, Steffen Görmer	DQ	0	R170.14
	Oceania	Gus Nketia (NZL), Damien Marsh (AUS), Steve Brimacombe (AUS), Tim Jackson (AUS)	DNF	0	

==== Women ====
11 September

Rank	Team	Athletes	Time	Points	Notes
1	Africa	Faith Idehen (NGR), Mary Tombiri (NGR), Christy Opara (NGR), Mary Onyali (NGR)	42.92	8	
2	Germany	Andrea Philipp, Silke Lichtenhagen, Silke Knoll, Melanie Paschke	43.22	7	
3	Oceania	Monique Miers (AUS), Cathy Freeman (AUS), Melinda Gainsford (AUS), Michelle Seymour (NZL)	43.36	6	
4	Asia	Chen Yan (CHN), Liu Xiaomei (CHN), Chen Zhaojing (CHN), Huang Xiaoyan (CHN)	43.63	5	
5	United States	Shantel Twiggs, Wendy Vereen, Flirtisha Harris, Chryste Gaines	43.79	4	
6	Europe	Natalya Anisimova (RUS), Marina Trandenkova (RUS), Svetla Dimitrova (BUL), Yekaterina Leshchova (RUS)	43.99	3	
7	Americas	Kátia de Jesus (BRA), Aliuska López (CUB), Cleide Amaral (BRA), Liliana Allen (CUB)	44.26	2	
8	Great Britain	Jacqui Agyepong, Geraldine McLeod, Simmone Jacobs, Paula Thomas	44.45	1	

=== 4 × 400 m relay ===
==== Men ====
11 September

Rank	Team	Athletes	Time	Points	Notes
1	Great Britain	David McKenzie, Du'aine Ladejo, Jamie Baulch, Roger Black	3:01.34	8	
2	Africa	Simon Kemboi (KEN), Samuel Matete (ZAM), Samson Kitur (KEN), Sunday Bada (NGR)	3:02.66	7	
3	Europe	Mathias Rusterholz (SUI), Stéphane Diagana (FRA), Mikhail Vdovin (RUS), Dmitriy Golovastov (RUS)	3:03.26	6	
4	Germany	Daniel Bittner, Julian Voelkel, Nico Motchebon, Olaf Hense	3:04.15	5	
5	Americas	Inaldo Sena (BRA), Iván García (CUB), Norberto Téllez (CUB), Michael McDonald (JAM)	3:04.28	4	
6	Oceania	Shaun Farrell (NZL), Brett Callaghan (AUS), Michael Joubert (AUS), Paul Greene (AUS)	3:05.70	3	
7	Asia	Shigeaki Matsunaga (JPN), Mohamed Sadaqat (PAK), Sugath Thilakaratne (SRI), Kim Yong-hwan (KOR)	3:12.38	2	
DNS	United States	Calvin Davis, Darnell Hall, Ron Clark, Jason Rouser		0	

==== Women ====
9 September

Rank	Team	Athletes	Time	Points	Notes
1	Great Britain	Phylis Smith, Linda Keough, Melanie Neef, Sally Gunnell	3:27.36	8	
2	Germany	Karin Janke, Uta Rohländer, Heike Meißner, Anja Rücker	3:27.59	7	
3	Americas	Nancy McLeón (CUB), Sandie Richards (JAM), Idalmis Bonne (CUB), Julia Duporty (CUB)	3:27.91	6	
4	Europe	Francine Landre (FRA), Viviane Dorsile (FRA), Evelyn Elien (FRA), Marie-José Pérec (FRA)	3:29.07	5	
5	United States	Rochelle Stevens, Flirtisha Harris, Kim Graham, Michelle Collins	3:30.99	4	
6	Oceania	Lee Naylor (AUS), Melanie Collins (AUS), Kylie Hanigan (AUS), Cathy Freeman (AUS)	3:31.63	3	
7	Asia	Kutty Saramma (IND), Shiny Wilson (IND), Jayamani Illeperuma (SRI), Lu Xifang (CHN)	3:40.89	2	
	Africa	Omolade Akinremi (NGR), Nezha Bidouane (MAR), Olabisi Afolabi (NGR), Fatima Yusuf (NGR)	DQ	0	R170.14

=== High jump ===
==== Men ====
11 September

Rank	Athlete	Team	Result	Points	Notes
1	Javier Sotomayor (CUB)	Americas	2.40	8	
2	Tim Forsyth (AUS)	Oceania	2.28	7	
3	Steve Smith	Great Britain	2.28	6	
4	Steinar Hoen (NOR)	Europe	2.25	5	
5	Wolfgang Kreissig	Germany	2.20	4	
6	Yoshiteru Kaihoko (JPN)	Asia	2.20	3	
7	Khemraj Naiko (MRI)	Africa	2.15	2	
8	Jeff Wylie	United States	2.15	1	

==== Women ====
9 September

Rank	Athlete	Team	Result	Points	Notes
1	Britta Bilač (SLO)	Europe	1.91	8	
2	Charmaine Weavers (RSA)	Africa	1.91	7	
3	Silvia Costa (CUB)	Americas	1.91	6	
4	Heike Balck	Germany	1.88	5	
5	Svetlana Zalevskaya (KAZ)	Asia	1.85	4	
6	Debbie Marti	Great Britain	1.85	3	
7	Alison Inverarity (AUS)	Oceania	1.85	2	
8	Karol Damon	United States	1.80	1	

=== Pole vault ===
==== Men ====
10 September

Rank	Athlete	Team	Result	Points	Notes
1	Okkert Brits (RSA)	Africa	5.90	8	
2	Jean Galfione (FRA)	Europe	5.75	7	
3	Alberto Manzano (CUB)	Americas	5.40	6	
4	Andrei Tivontchik	Germany	5.40	5	
5	Scott Huffman	United States	5.40	4	
6	Grigoriy Yegorov (KAZ)	Asia	5.40	3	
7	James Miller (AUS)	Oceania	5.20	2	
	Neil Winter	Great Britain	NM	0	

=== Long jump ===
==== Men ====
9 September

Rank	Athlete	Team	Result	Points	Notes
1	Fred Salle	Great Britain	8.10	8	
2	Douglas de Souza (BRA)	Americas	7.96	7	
3	Dion Bentley	United States	7.93	6	
4	Obinna Eregbu (NGR)	Africa	7.87	5	
5	Georg Ackermann	Germany	7.84	4	
6	Tetsuya Shida (JPN)	Asia	7.72	3	
7	Dave Culbert (AUS)	Oceania	7.59	2	
8	Milan Gombala (CZE)	Europe	7.37	1	

==== Women ====
11 September

Rank	Athlete	Team	Result	Points	Notes
1	Inessa Kravets (UKR)	Europe	7.00	8	
2	Niurka Montalvo (CUB)	Americas	6.70	7	
3	Christy Opara-Thompson (NGR)	Africa	6.66	6	
4	Yao Weili (CHN)	Asia	6.60	5	
5	Sabine Braun	Germany	6.54	4	
6	Olyinka Idowu	Great Britain	6.51	3	
7	Nicole Boegman (AUS)	Oceania	6.45	2	
8	Sheila Echols	United States	6.23	1	

=== Triple jump ===
==== Men ====
10 September

Rank	Athlete	Team	Result	Points	Notes
1	Yoelbi Quesada (CUB)	Americas	17.61	8	
2	Julian Golley	Great Britain	17.06	7	
3	Oleg Sakirkin (KAZ)	Asia	16.81	6	
4	Lotfi Khaïda (ALG)	Africa	16.75w	5	
5	Serge Hélan (FRA)	Europe	16.67w	4	
6	Reggie Jones	United States	16.41w	3	
7	Wolfgang Knabe	Germany	16.07	2	
8	Andrew Murphy (AUS)	Oceania	15.86w	1	

==== Women ====
9 September

Rank	Athlete	Team	Result	Points	Notes
1	Anna Biryukova (RUS)	Europe	14.46	8	
2	Sheila Hudson-Strudwick	United States	14.00	7	
3	Ren Ruiping (CHN)	Asia	13.84	6	
4	Michelle Griffith	Great Britain	13.70	5	
5	Niurka Montalvo (CUB)	America	13.84	4	
6	Helga Radtke	Germany	13.70	3	
7	Tania Dixon (NZL)	Oceania	12.55	2	
8	Hasna Atiallah (MAR)	Africa	12.44	1	

=== Shot put ===
==== Men ====
9 September

Rank	Athlete	Team	Result	Points	Notes
1	C. J. Hunter	United States	19.92	8	
2	Aleksandr Klimenko (UKR)	Europe	19.16	7	
3	Courtney Ireland (NZL)	Oceania	18.93	6	
4	Oliver-Sven Buder	Germany	18.88	5	
5	Burger Lambrechts (RSA)	Africa	18.08	4	
6	Carlos Fandiño (CUB)	Americas	18.04	3	
7	Bilal Saad Mubarak (QAT)	Asia	17.40	2	
8	Nigel Spratley	Great Britain	17.20	1	

==== Women ====
10 September

Rank	Athlete	Team	Result	Points	Notes
1	Huang Zhihong (CHN)	Asia	19.45	8	
2	Belsis Laza (CUB)	Americas	19.07	7	
3	Astrid Kumbernuss	Germany	18.89	6	
4	Vita Pavlysh (UKR)	Europe	18.67	5	
5	Judy Oakes	Great Britain	17.92	4	
6	Dawn Dumble	United States	17.92	3	
7	Fouzia Fatihi (MAR)	Africa	15.48	2	
8	Lisa-Marie Vizaniari (AUS)	Oceania	15.23	1	

=== Discus throw ===
==== Men ====
10 September

Rank	Athlete	Team	Result	Points	Notes
1	Vladimir Dubrovshchik (BLR)	Europe	64.54	8	
2	Alexis Elizarde (CUB)	Americas	61.50	7	
3	Adewale Olukoju (NGR)	Africa	60.22	6	
4	Werner Reiterer (AUS)	Oceania	60.22	5	
5	Jürgen Schult	Germany	58.86	4	
6	Mike Gravelle	United States	56.76	3	
7	Robert Weir	Great Britain	55.86	2	
	Bilal Saad Mubarak (QAT)	Asia	DNS	0	

==== Women ====
11 September

Rank	Athlete	Team	Result	Points	Notes
1	Ilke Wyludda	Germany	65.30	8	
2	Ellina Zvereva (BLR)	Europe	63.86	7	
3	Daniela Costian (AUS)	Oceania	63.38	6	
4	Barbara Hechavarría (CUB)	Americas	62.90	5	
5	Qiu Qiaoping (CHN)	Asia	57.92	4	
6	Connie Price-Smith	United States	57.04	3	
7	Jackie McKernan	Great Britain	56.28	2	
8	Lizette Etsebeth (RSA)	Africa	51.54	1	

=== Hammer throw ===
==== Men ====
10 September

Rank	Athlete	Team	Result	Points	Notes
1	Andrey Abduvaliyev (TJK)	Asia	81.72	8	
2	Lance Deal	United States	81.14	7	
3	Heinz Weis	Germany	81.14	6	
4	Vasiliy Sidorenko (RUS)	Europe	76.34	5	
5	Alberto Sánchez (CUB)	Americas	74.72	4	
6	Sean Carlin (AUS)	Oceania	74.54	3	
7	Hakim Toumi (ALG)	Africa	69.38	2	
8	Paul Head	Great Britain	68.38	1	

=== Javelin throw ===
==== Men ====
11 September

Rank	Athlete	Team	Result	Points	Notes
1	Steve Backley	Great Britain	85.02	8	
2	Raymond Hecht	Germany	84.36	7	
3	Gavin Lovegrove (NZL)	Oceania	82.28	6	
4	Patrik Bodén (SWE)	Europe	80.86	5	
5	Louis Fouché (SWE)	Africa	76.98	4	
6	Zhang Lianbiao (CHN)	Asia	76.96	3	
7	Emeterio González (CUB)	Americas	76.42	2	
8	Todd Riech	United States	70.28	1	

==== Women ====
9 September

Rank	Athlete	Team	Result	Points	Notes
1	Trine Hattestad (NOR)	Europe	66.48	8	
2	Isel López (CUB)	Americas	61.40	7	
3	Karen Forkel	Germany	61.26	6	
4	Louise McPaul (AUS)	Oceania	59.92	5	
5	Zhang Li (CHN)	Asia	58.82	4	
6	Sharon Gibson	Great Britain	53.32	3	
7	Donna Mayhew	United States	51.50	2	
8	Rhona Dwinger (RSA)	Africa	49.02	1	
