= 1996 Ibero-American Championships in Athletics – Results =

These are the full results of the 1996 Ibero-American Championships in Athletics which took place on May 9–11, 1996 on Estadio Alfonso Galvis Duque in Medellín, Colombia.

== Men's results ==
=== 100 meters ===
Heats – May 10
Wind:
Heat 1: +3.0 m/s, Heat 2: +2.7 m/s, Heat 3: +4.1 m/s

Rank	Heat	Name	Nationality	Time	Notes
1	3	Arnaldo da Silva	Brazil	10.11	Q
2	2	Sebastián Keitel	Chile	10.23	Q
3	3	Joel Isasi	Cuba	10.27	Q
4	1	Marcelo Brivilati da Silva	Brazil	10.28	Q
5	3	Luís Cunha	Portugal	10.31	q
6	1	Andrés Simón	Cuba	10.36	Q
7	2	Jorge Polanco	Argentina	10.38	Q
8	3	Jorge Castellón	Bolivia	10.41	q
9	3	Miguel Miranda	Mexico	10.44	
10	2	Adalberto Méndez	Dominican Republic	10.50	
11	1	Jorge Cañizales	Venezuela	10.53	
12	1	Genaro Rojas	Mexico	10.53	
13	2	Javier Verme	Peru	10.54	
14	2	Carlos Santos	Puerto Rico	10.55	
15	1	Ceferino Mondino	Argentina	10.61	
16	1	Agner Nuñez	Puerto Rico	10.61	
17	2	Oscar Meneses	Guatemala	10.70	
18	3	Karl Brown Mordan	Costa Rica	10.98	
19	3	Ramiro Villaroel	Bolivia	11.00	

Final – May 10
Wind:
+1.5 m/s

Rank	Name	Nationality	Time	Notes
1st place, gold medalist(s)	Sebastián Keitel	Chile	10.13	
2nd place, silver medalist(s)	Arnaldo da Silva	Brazil	10.17	
3rd place, bronze medalist(s)	Marcelo Brivilati da Silva	Brazil	10.37	
4	Joel Isasi	Cuba	10.39	
5	Andrés Simón	Cuba	10.46	
6	Luís Cunha	Portugal	10.47	
7	Jorge Polanco	Argentina	10.57	
8	Jorge Castellón	Bolivia	10.67	

Extra – May 11
Wind:
+1.1 m/s

Rank	Name	Nationality	Time	Notes
1	Luis Alberto Pérez-Rionda	Cuba	10.33	
2	Alejandro Banda	Mexico	10.50	
3	Joel Lamela	Cuba	10.54	
4	Carlos Villaseñor	Mexico	10.57	
5	Jimmy Pino	Colombia	10.5?	
6	Robinson Urrutia	Colombia	10.6?	

=== 200 meters ===
Heats – May 11
Wind:
Heat 1: -2.1 m/s, Heat 2: -1.6 m/s, Heat 3: -2.2 m/s

Rank	Heat	Name	Nationality	Time	Notes
1	1	Marcelo Brivilati da Silva	Brazil	20.58	Q
2	1	Wilson Cañizales	Colombia	21.00	Q
3	2	Sebastián Keitel	Chile	21.15	Q
4	3	Misael Ortiz	Cuba	21.16	Q
5	2	Javier Verme	Peru	21.34	Q
6	2	Guillermo Cacián	Argentina	21.45	q
7	1	Joel Lamela	Cuba	21.46	q
8	3	Luís Cunha	Portugal	21.52	Q
9	3	Jorge Castellón	Bolivia	21.59	
10	3	Rosendo Rivera	Puerto Rico	21.83	
11	1	César Díaz	Puerto Rico	21.85	
12	1	Karl Brown Mordan	Costa Rica	22.67	

Final – May 12
Wind:
-2.7 m/s

Rank	Name	Nationality	Time	Notes
1st place, gold medalist(s)	Sebastián Keitel	Chile	20.53	
2nd place, silver medalist(s)	Marcelo Brivilati da Silva	Brazil	20.71	
3rd place, bronze medalist(s)	Misael Ortiz	Cuba	21.15	
4	Wilson Cañizales	Colombia	21.16	
	Joel Lamela	Cuba	DQ	
	Guillermo Cacián	Argentina	DQ	
	Luís Cunha	Portugal	DNF	
	Javier Verme	Peru	DNF	

=== 400 meters ===
Heats – May 10

Rank	Heat	Name	Nationality	Time	Notes
1	1	Sanderlei Parrela	Brazil	45.76	Q
2	2	Inaldo Sena	Brazil	46.35	Q
3	1	Jorge Crusellas	Cuba	46.59	Q
4	1	Wenceslao Ferrín	Colombia	46.92	Q
5	2	Roberto Hernández	Cuba	47.15	Q
6	2	Alvaro Obando	Costa Rica	47.40 (?)	Q
7	2	Guillermo Cacián	Argentina	47.38 (?)	q
8	1	Raymundo Escalante	Mexico	47.74	q
9	1	Jesús Feliciano	Puerto Rico	48.38	
10	2	Jonairon Gómez	Colombia	48.56	
11	2	Alejandro García	Bolivia	50.14	

Final – May 11

Rank	Name	Nationality	Time	Notes
1st place, gold medalist(s)	Sanderlei Parrela	Brazil	45.57	
2nd place, silver medalist(s)	Inaldo Sena	Brazil	45.88	
3rd place, bronze medalist(s)	Jorge Crusellas	Cuba	46.25	
4	Wenceslao Ferrín	Colombia	46.81	
5	Roberto Hernández	Cuba	46.95	
6	Alvaro Obando	Costa Rica	47.26	
7	Guillermo Cacián	Argentina	47.47	
8	Raymundo Escalante	Mexico	47.64	

Extra – May 10

Rank	Name	Nationality	Time	Notes
1	Omar Meña	Cuba	46.43	
2	Valdinei da Silva	Brazil	46.43	
3	Georkis Vera	Cuba	47.16	
4	Osmar dos Santos	Brazil	47.41	

=== 800 meters ===
Heats – May 11

Rank	Heat	Name	Nationality	Time	Notes
1	1	Norberto Téllez	Cuba	1:49.80	Q
2	1	José Luíz Barbosa	Brazil	1:49.93	Q
3	2	Alain Miranda	Cuba	1:50.00	Q
4	2	Mark Olivo	Venezuela	1:50.03	Q
5	1	José Azevedo	Portugal	1:50.09	Q
6	2	Flávio Godoy	Brazil	1:50.10	Q
7	1	Arturo Espejel	Mexico	1:50.28	q
8	2	Alcides Pinto	Colombia	1:50.55	q
9	1	Pablo Squella	Chile	1:50.79	
10	1	César Suárez	Colombia	1:51.45	
11	2	Juan José Tapia	Panama	1:53.25	
12	2	Amado Amador	Mexico	1:53.99	
13	1	Jorge Isaac Rojas	Costa Rica	1:54.74	
	2	Arisk Perdomo	Guatemala	DNF	

Final – May 12

Rank	Name	Nationality	Time	Notes
1st place, gold medalist(s)	Norberto Téllez	Cuba	1:45.83	
2nd place, silver medalist(s)	Flávio Godoy	Brazil	1:47.11	
3rd place, bronze medalist(s)	Mark Olivo	Venezuela	1:47.67	
4	Arturo Espejel	Mexico	1:48.18	
5	José Azevedo	Portugal	1:48.97	
6	Alcides Pinto	Colombia	1:50.73	
	José Luíz Barbosa	Brazil	DNF	
	Alain Miranda	Cuba	DNF	

=== 1500 meters ===
May 11

Rank	Name	Nationality	Time	Notes
1st place, gold medalist(s)	Edgar de Oliveira	Brazil	3:43.00	
2nd place, silver medalist(s)	José Mauro Valente	Brazil	3:43.81	
3rd place, bronze medalist(s)	Gilberto Merchant	Mexico	3:44.11	
4	Ricardo Herrera	Mexico	3:45.06	
5	João N'Tyamba	Angola	3:45.41	
6	Jacinto Navarrete	Colombia	3:47.00	
7	William Roldán	Colombia	3:50.07	
8	Arisk Perdomo	Guatemala	3:53.56	
9	Bismark Ramírez	Cuba	3:57.60	
10	Gabriel Chandía	Argentina	3:58.04	
11	Said Gomez	Panama	3:58.62	
12	Jorge Ulate	Costa Rica	3:59.05	
	Mark Olivo	Venezuela	DNF	
	Juan José Tapia	Panama	DNF	

=== 5000 meters ===
May 12

Rank	Name	Nationality	Time	Notes
1st place, gold medalist(s)	William Roldán	Colombia	14:16.20	
2nd place, silver medalist(s)	Herder Vásquez	Colombia	14:18.88	
3rd place, bronze medalist(s)	Gerardo Morales	Mexico	14:19.87	
4	Tomix da Costa	Brazil	14:37.53	
5	Francisco Frías	Mexico	14:38.41	
6	Said Gomez	Panama	14:57.12	
7	Elisardo León	Cuba	15:06.08	
8	Johnny Loria	Costa Rica	15:17.85	
	Marcos Juárez	Guatemala	DNF	

=== 10,000 meters ===
May 10

Rank	Name	Nationality	Time	Notes
1st place, gold medalist(s)	Herder Vásquez	Colombia	30:08.35	
2nd place, silver medalist(s)	Jacinto López	Colombia	30:09.76	
3rd place, bronze medalist(s)	Gerardo Morales	Mexico	30:13.28	
4	Tomix da Costa	Brazil	30:37.46	
5	Víctor Rodríguez	Mexico	30:43.47	
6	Elías Bastos	Brazil	31:00.68	
7	Marcos Juárez	Guatemala	31:07.70	

=== 110 meters hurdles ===
Heats – May 11
Wind:
Heat 1: 0.0 m/s, Heat 2: 0.0 m/s

Rank	Heat	Name	Nationality	Time	Notes
1	2	Anier García	Cuba	13.55	Q
2	1	Alexis Sánchez	Cuba	13.76	Q
2	2	Pedro Chiamulera	Brazil	13.76	Q
4	1	Walmes de Souza	Brazil	13.87	Q
5	2	Arturo Rodríguez	Chile	14.10	Q
6	1	José Humberto Rivas	Colombia	14.28	Q
6	2	Julián González	Colombia	14.28	q
8	2	Oscar Ratto	Argentina	14.31	q
9	1	José David Riesco	Peru	14.34	
10	1	Miguel Soto	Puerto Rico	14.40	
11	1	Alex Foster	Costa Rica	14.56	
12	2	José Carmona	Puerto Rico	14.63	
13	1	Adrián Garza	Mexico	14.73	
14	1	Reinaldo Guerrero	Dominican Republic	14.81	
	2	Modesto Castillo	Dominican Republic	DNF	

Final – May 11
Wind:
-0.1 m/s

Rank	Name	Nationality	Time	Notes
1st place, gold medalist(s)	Anier García	Cuba	13.39	
2nd place, silver medalist(s)	Pedro Chiamulera	Brazil	13.58	
3rd place, bronze medalist(s)	Alexis Sánchez	Cuba	13.89	
4	Walmes de Souza	Brazil	13.93	
5	Arturo Rodríguez	Chile	14.05	
6	Julián González	Colombia	14.25	
7	Oscar Ratto	Argentina	14.36	
8	José Humberto Rivas	Colombia	14.62	

=== 400 meters hurdles ===
Heats – May 11

Rank	Heat	Name	Nationality	Time	Notes
1	1	Carlos Silva	Portugal	49.25	Q
2	2	Alexis Sánchez	Cuba	49.76	Q
3	1	José Roque Pérez	Cuba	49.91	Q
4	2	Domingo Cordero	Puerto Rico	50.06	Q
5	2	Cleverson da Silva	Brazil	50.30	Q
6	1	Llimy Rivas	Colombia	50.32	Q
7	2	Pedro Rodrigues	Portugal	50.82	q
8	2	Miguel Pérez	Argentina	50.92	q
9	2	Alexander Mena	Colombia	50.96	
10	1	Juan Vallín	Mexico	51.69	
11	2	Antonio Smith	Venezuela	52.28	
12	1	Francisco Carlos de Lima	Brazil	52.51	
	1	Alex Foster	Costa Rica	DNF	

Final – May 12

Rank	Name	Nationality	Time	Notes
1st place, gold medalist(s)	Alexis Sánchez	Cuba	49.22	
2nd place, silver medalist(s)	Carlos Silva	Portugal	49.33	
3rd place, bronze medalist(s)	Domingo Cordero	Puerto Rico	49.64	
4	Cleverson da Silva	Brazil	50.17	
5	Llimy Rivas	Colombia	50.58	
6	José Roque Pérez	Cuba	50.73	
7	Miguel Pérez	Argentina	51.08	
8	Pedro Rodrigues	Portugal	51.87	

=== 3000 meters steeplechase ===
May 11

Rank	Name	Nationality	Time	Notes
1st place, gold medalist(s)	Clodoaldo do Carmo	Brazil	8:47.18	
2nd place, silver medalist(s)	Héctor Arias	Mexico	8:54.64	
3rd place, bronze medalist(s)	Eduardo do Nascimento	Brazil	8:57.46	
4	Néstor Nieves	Venezuela	8:59.56	
5	Rubén García	Mexico	9:11.20	
6	Cândido Maio	Portugal	9:12.99	
7	Gonzalo Vanegas	Colombia	9:19.63	
8	Johnny Loria	Costa Rica	9:35.24	

=== 4 × 100 meters relay ===
May 12

Rank	Nation	Competitors	Time	Notes
1st place, gold medalist(s)	Mexico	Carlos Villaseñor, Alejandro Cárdenas, Raymundo Escalante, Miguel Miranda	39.60	
2nd place, silver medalist(s)	Puerto Rico	Carlos Santos, Agner Muñoz, Rosendo Rivera, Domingo Cordero	39.93	
3rd place, bronze medalist(s)	Argentina	Jorge Polanco, Guillermo Cacián, Ceferino Mondino, Carlos Gats	40.33	
4	Colombia	Robinson Urrutia, Wilson Cañizales, Jimmy Pino, José Humberto Rivas	40.62	
	Cuba		DQ	

=== 4 × 400 meters relay ===
May 12

Rank	Nation	Competitors	Time	Notes
1st place, gold medalist(s)	Cuba	Omar Meña, Jorge Crusellas, Georkis Vera, Norberto Téllez	3:03.98	
2nd place, silver medalist(s)	Brazil	Valdinei da Silva, Sanderlei Parrela, Osmar dos Santos, Inaldo Sena	3:04.28	
3rd place, bronze medalist(s)	Colombia	Julio César Rojas, Llimy Rivas, Wenceslao Ferrín, Wilson Cañizales	3:07.13	
4	Argentina	Jorge Polanco, Miguel Pérez, Ceferino Mondino, Guillermo Cacián	3:10.89	
5	Puerto Rico	Agner Muñoz, César Díaz, Jesús Feliciano, Rosendo Rivera	3:11.92	

=== 20 kilometers walk ===
May 11

Rank	Name	Nationality	Time	Notes
1st place, gold medalist(s)	Jorge Segura	Mexico	1:25:25.21	
2nd place, silver medalist(s)	Germán Sánchez	Mexico	1:26:30	
3rd place, bronze medalist(s)	Héctor Moreno	Colombia	1:26:54	
4	Roberto Oscal	Guatemala	1:27:42	
5	Claudio Bertolino	Brazil	1:29:07	
6	Jorge Luis Pino	Cuba	1:29:57	
7	Fernando Rozo	Colombia	1:30:37	
8	Carlos Ramones	Venezuela	1:33:14	
	Daniel Vargas	Cuba	?	
	Luis Fernando García	Guatemala	?	
	Ademar Kammler	Brazil	?	

- NB: Official report has Miguel Ángel Rodríguez (an athlete who competed almost exclusively at 50 km) as the winner in 1:25:36. This differs from the GBR Athletics winner, Jorge Segura as listed above.

=== High jump ===
May 11

Rank	Name	Nationality	Result	Notes
1st place, gold medalist(s)	Javier Sotomayor	Cuba	2.30	
2nd place, silver medalist(s)	Gilmar Mayo	Colombia	2.23	
3rd place, bronze medalist(s)	Julio Luciano	Dominican Republic	2.10	
3rd place, bronze medalist(s)	Marcos dos Santos	Brazil	2.10	
5	Franco Moy	Peru	2.10	
6	Erasmo Jara	Argentina	2.10	
7	Osnaldo Smith	Venezuela	2.05	

=== Pole vault ===
May 11

Rank	Name	Nationality	Result	Notes
1st place, gold medalist(s)	Alberto Manzano	Cuba	5.55	CR
2nd place, silver medalist(s)	Edgar Díaz	Puerto Rico	5.50	
3rd place, bronze medalist(s)	Juan Saldarriaga	Colombia	5.00	
4	Jorge Tienda	Mexico	4.90	
5	Fernando Pastoriza	Argentina	4.70	

=== Long jump ===
May 10

Rank	Name	Nationality	#1	#2	#3	#4	#5	#6	Result	Notes
1st place, gold medalist(s)	Nélson Carlos Ferreira	Brazil	8.25w	8.41w	x	x	7.54	8.36	8.41w	
2nd place, silver medalist(s)	Jaime Jefferson	Cuba							8.28w	
3rd place, bronze medalist(s)	Carlos Calado	Portugal	7.78w	x	7.68	8.02	8.06w	x	8.06w	
4	Elmer Williams	Puerto Rico							8.00w	
5	Pedro Pavel García	Cuba							7.99w	
6	Márcio da Cruz	Brazil							7.74	
7	Jesid Cossio	Colombia							7.70w	
8	Lewis Asprilla	Colombia							7.63w	
9	Iván Salcedo	Mexico							7.42	
10	Luis Daniel Soto	Puerto Rico							7.34w	
11	Ricardo Valiente	Peru							7.25w	
12	Ramiro Villarroel	Bolivia							7.10w	
13	Héctor Solorzano	Guatemala							6.58	

=== Triple jump ===
May 12

Rank	Name	Nationality	#1	#2	#3	#4	#5	#6	Result	Notes
1st place, gold medalist(s)	Messias José Baptista	Brazil	16.68	16.81	16.61	16.99	x	16.55	16.99	
2nd place, silver medalist(s)	Carlos Calado	Portugal	16.64	x	16.49	14.78	16.65	16.82	16.82	
3rd place, bronze medalist(s)	Osiris Mora	Cuba	16.04	16.18	16.45	x	x	16.34	16.45	
4	Iván Salcedo	Mexico	x	15.75	15.96	x	x	x	15.96	
5	José Escalera	Puerto Rico	14.99	x	15.24	15.33	15.54	15.59	15.59	
6	Leisner Aragón	Colombia	14.89	15.07	15.15	15.01	x	?	15.15	
7	Ricardo Valiente	Peru	15.07	x	14.83	15.11	x	x	15.11	

=== Shot put ===
May 10

Rank	Name	Nationality	Result	Notes
1st place, gold medalist(s)	Gert Weil	Chile	19.67	
2nd place, silver medalist(s)	Yoger Medina	Venezuela	18.10	
3rd place, bronze medalist(s)	Édson Miguel	Brazil	17.21	
4	Yosvany Obregón	Cuba	16.72	
5	Francisco Ball	Puerto Rico	16.50	
6	João Joaquim dos Santos	Brazil	16.40	
7	Orlando Ibarra	Colombia	16.14	
8	Jhonny Rodríguez	Colombia	15.66	

=== Discus throw ===
May 11

Rank	Name	Nationality	Result	Notes
1st place, gold medalist(s)	Frank Bicet	Cuba	58.12	
2nd place, silver medalist(s)	João Joaquim dos Santos	Brazil	55.32	
3rd place, bronze medalist(s)	Marcelo Pugliese	Argentina	54.32	
4	Alfredo Romero	Puerto Rico	51.70	
5	Rogelio Ospino	Colombia	51.50	
6	Andrés Solo de Zaldivar	Chile	51.08	
7	Édson Miguel	Brazil	50.16	
8	Orlando Ibarra	Colombia	46.60	

=== Hammer throw ===
May 12

Rank	Name	Nationality	Result	Notes
1st place, gold medalist(s)	Alberto Sánchez	Cuba	73.62	
2nd place, silver medalist(s)	Yosvany Suárez	Cuba	70.54	
3rd place, bronze medalist(s)	Vitor da Costa	Portugal	69.84	
4	Andrés Charadía	Argentina	67.94	
5	Adrián Marzo	Argentina	64.36	
6	Pedro Rivail Atílio	Brazil	59.54	
7	Eduardo Acuña	Peru	58.12	
8	David Castrillón	Colombia	56.80	
9	Roberto Lozano	Colombia	55.64	

=== Javelin throw ===
May 12

Rank	Name	Nationality	Result	Notes
1st place, gold medalist(s)	Isbel Luaces	Cuba	78.74	
2nd place, silver medalist(s)	Rodrigo Zelaya	Chile	74.22	
3rd place, bronze medalist(s)	Edgar Baumann	Paraguay	73.94	
4	Luis Lucumí	Colombia	73.68	
5	Ovidio Trimiño	Cuba	73.52	
6	Daniel Alonso	Dominican Republic	66.98	
7	Luiz Fernando da Silva	Brazil	65.68	
8	Mauricio Silva	Argentina	64.60	

=== Decathlon ===
May 10–11

The highest mark recorded in each event is highlighted in yellow

Rank	Athlete	Nationality	100m	LJ	SP	HJ	400m	110m H	DT	PV	JT	1500m	Points	Notes
1st place, gold medalist(s)	Yonelvis Águila	Cuba	10.9	7.20	13.77	2.04	50.09	14.95	41.84	4.10	65.00	4:47.66	7705	
2nd place, silver medalist(s)	Alejandro Cárdenas	Mexico	10.2	7.72	12.55	1.74	46.33	15.73	38.32	4.40	57.28	4:52.35	7614	
3rd place, bronze medalist(s)	William Gallardo	Cuba	11.0	7.22	13.54	1.89	50.84	14.49	37.04	3.90	66.30	4:29.39	7544	
4	Márcio de Souza	Brazil	10.7	7.11	11.72	1.86	50.68	14.41	35.44	4.20	51.78	4:59.44	7112	
5	Cecilio Escobar	Colombia	11.6	6.12	11.24	1.89	52.96	16.61	35.22	3.50	37.86	4:29.48	6119	
	José Antonetti	Puerto Rico	10.8	7.54	11.60	1.83	DNF	–	–	–	–	–	DNF	
	Edwinson López	Colombia	11.2	6.48	9.16	1.65	DNF	–	–	–	–	–	DNF	

== Women's results ==
=== 100 meters ===
Heats – May 10
Wind:
Heat 1: +3.2 m/s, Heat 2: +3.8 m/s

Rank	Heat	Name	Nationality	Time	Notes
1	2	Mirtha Brock	Colombia	11.44	Q
2	1	Sandra Borrero	Colombia	11.49	Q
3	2	Lisette Rondón	Chile	11.53	Q
4	2	Cleide Amaral	Brazil	11.55	Q
5	2	Idalia Hechavarría	Cuba	11.60	q
6	1	Kátia Regina Santos	Brazil	11.61	Q
7	2	Elaine Torres (?)	Puerto Rico	11.77	q
8	1	Eileen Torres (?)	Puerto Rico	11.84	Q
9	1	Liliana Allen	Cuba	11.89	
10	2	Ruth Grajeda	Mexico	12.09	
	1	Erika Cyrus	Costa Rica	DNF	

Final – May 10
Wind:
+1.0 m/s

Rank	Name	Nationality	Time	Notes
1st place, gold medalist(s)	Cleide Amaral	Brazil	11.48	
2nd place, silver medalist(s)	Sandra Borrero	Colombia	11.50	
3rd place, bronze medalist(s)	Idalia Hechavarría	Cuba	11.54	
4	Mirtha Brock	Colombia	11.60	
5	Kátia Regina Santos	Brazil	11.76	
6	Elaine Torres	Puerto Rico	11.79	
7	Lisette Rondón	Chile	11.81	
8	Eileen Torres	Puerto Rico	11.94	

Extra – May 11
Wind:
0.0 m/s

Rank	Name	Nationality	Time	Notes
1	Lucimar de Moura	Brazil	11.50	
2	Dainelky Pérez	Cuba	11.52	
3	Kátia Regina Santos	Brazil	11.60	
4	Vânia María da Silva	Brazil	12.17	
	Paola Restrepo	Colombia	DNS	
	Clara Córdoba	Colombia	DNS	

=== 200 meters ===
Heats – May 11
Wind:
Heat 1: -1.9 m/s, Heat 2: -1.3 m/s

Rank	Heat	Name	Nationality	Time	Notes
1	1	Felipa Palacios	Colombia	23.12	Q
2	1	Idalmis Bonne	Cuba	23.16	Q
3	2	Surella Morales	Cuba	23.36	Q
4	2	Olga Conte	Argentina	23.71	Q
5	2	Claudia Moctezuma	Mexico	24.09	Q
6	2	Patricia Rodríguez	Colombia	24.27	q
7	1	Lucimar de Moura	Brazil	24.28	Q
8	2	Kátia Regina Santos	Brazil	24.33	q
9	1	Lisette Rondón	Chile	24.44	
10	1	Xiomara Dávila	Puerto Rico	25.57	
	1	Carmo Tavares	Portugal	DNF	
	2	Erika Cyrus	Costa Rica	DNF	

Final – May 12
Wind:
-1.1 m/s

Rank	Name	Nationality	Time	Notes
1st place, gold medalist(s)	Felipa Palacios	Colombia	22.93	
2nd place, silver medalist(s)	Idalmis Bonne	Cuba	23.07	
3rd place, bronze medalist(s)	Surella Morales	Cuba	23.11	
4	Olga Conte	Argentina	23.45	PB
5	Lucimar de Moura	Brazil	23.96	
6	Claudia Moctezuma	Mexico	24.18	
	Patricia Rodríguez	Colombia	DNF	
	Kátia Regina Santos	Brazil	DNF	

=== 400 meters ===
Heats – May 10

Rank	Heat	Name	Nationality	Time	Notes
1	2	Ximena Restrepo	Colombia	51.58	Q
2	2	Maria Magnólia Figueiredo	Brazil	52.46	Q
3	2	Nancy McLeón	Cuba	52.81	Q
4	1	Julia Duporty	Cuba	53.14	Q
5	2	Olga Conte	Argentina	53.47	q
6	2	Carmo Tavares	Portugal	54.37	q
7	1	Wanda Betancourt	Puerto Rico	54.47	Q
8	1	Ana Guevara	Mexico	55.17	Q
9	1	Luciana Mendes	Brazil	55.44	

Final – May 11

Rank	Name	Nationality	Time	Notes
1st place, gold medalist(s)	Julia Duporty	Cuba	50.84	
2nd place, silver medalist(s)	Ximena Restrepo	Colombia	50.87	
3rd place, bronze medalist(s)	Maria Magnólia Figueiredo	Brazil	51.36	
4	Olga Conte	Argentina	52.95	
5	Nancy McLeón	Cuba	53.07	
6	Wanda Betancourt	Puerto Rico	53.77	
7	Ana Guevara	Mexico	54.92	
	Carmo Tavares	Portugal	DNF	

Extra – May 10

Rank	Name	Nationality	Time	Notes
1	Idalmis Bonne	Cuba	51.34	
2	Surella Morales	Cuba	51.56	
3	Odalmis Limonta	Cuba	52.56	
4	Daimí Pernía	Cuba	53.10	

=== 800 meters ===
May 12

Rank	Name	Nationality	Time	Notes
1st place, gold medalist(s)	Ana Fidelia Quirot	Cuba	2:02.50	
2nd place, silver medalist(s)	Mairelín Fuentes	Cuba	2:04.77	
3rd place, bronze medalist(s)	Marta Orellana	Argentina	2:04.81	
4	Marlene da Silva	Brazil	2:05.90	
5	Janeth Lucumí	Colombia	2:08.73	
6	Mireya Alhaud	Mexico	2:08.96	
7	Sandra Moya	Puerto Rico	2:10.64	
8	Fátima dos Santos	Brazil	2:14.24	

=== 1500 meters ===
May 11

Rank	Name	Nationality	Time	Notes
1st place, gold medalist(s)	Marta Orellana	Argentina	4:20.99	
2nd place, silver medalist(s)	Yesenia Centeno	Cuba	4:22.30	
3rd place, bronze medalist(s)	Célia dos Santos	Brazil	4:25.98	
4	Mireya Aihaud	Mexico	4:27.66	
5	Ludmila Duboy	Cuba	4:31.39	
6	Bertha Sánchez	Colombia	4:32.15	
7	Patricia Rétiz	Mexico	4:35.65	
8	Elisa Cobañea	Argentina	4:36.77	
9	Ana Claudia de Souza	Brazil	4:41.54	
10	Marcela Jackson	Costa Rica	4:42.38	
11	Elsa Monterroso	Guatemala	4:43.44	

=== 5000 meters ===
May 12

Rank	Name	Nationality	Time	Notes
1st place, gold medalist(s)	Érika Olivera	Chile	16:26.13	
2nd place, silver medalist(s)	Stella Castro	Colombia	16:35.34	
3rd place, bronze medalist(s)	Iglandini González	Colombia	16:37.97	
4	Silvana Pereira	Brazil	16:42.27	
5	Yesenia Centeno	Cuba	16:44.07	
6	Elisa Cobañea	Argentina	17:04.45	
7	Eloisa Doral	Mexico	17:08.45	
8	Paola Cabrera	Mexico	17:08.45	
9	Ludmila Duboy	Cuba	17:48.64	
10	Marcela Jackson	Costa Rica	17:48.90	
11	Elisa Monterroso	Guatemala	18:24.82	
	Solange de Souza	Brazil	DNF	

=== 10,000 meters ===
May 10

Rank	Name	Nationality	Time	Notes
1st place, gold medalist(s)	Stella Castro	Colombia	34:28.74	
2nd place, silver medalist(s)	Santa Velázquez	Mexico	34:29.95	
3rd place, bronze medalist(s)	Érika Olivera	Chile	34:41.75	
4	Iglandini González	Colombia	34:56.97	
5	Silvana Pereira	Brazil	35:18.13	
6	María Elena Reina	Mexico	35:38.80	
7	Solange de Souza	Brazil	35:49.80	

=== 100 meters hurdles ===
May 10
Wind: +3.0 m/s

Rank	Name	Nationality	Time	Notes
1st place, gold medalist(s)	Joyce Meléndez	Puerto Rico	13.40	
2nd place, silver medalist(s)	Damaris Anderson	Cuba	13.54	
3rd place, bronze medalist(s)	Katia Brito	Cuba	13.57	
4	Vânia María da Silva	Brazil	13.64	
5	Carmen Bezanilla	Chile	13.87	
6	Martha Dinas	Colombia	14.26	
7	Gilda Massa	Peru	14.49	
	Maurren Maggi	Brazil	DNF	

=== 400 meters hurdles ===
May 12

Rank	Name	Nationality	Time	Notes
1st place, gold medalist(s)	Lency Montelier	Cuba	57.84	
2nd place, silver medalist(s)	Odalys Hernández	Cuba	57.96	
3rd place, bronze medalist(s)	Flor Robledo	Colombia	58.19	
4	Mayra González	Mexico	58.64	
5	Maria José dos Santos	Brazil	59.61	
6	Marise Cristina Silva	Brazil	1:01.35	
7	Alejandra Quintanar	Mexico	1:02.95	
	María Molina	Costa Rica	DNF	

=== 4 × 100 meters relay ===
May 12

Rank	Nation	Competitors	Time	Notes
1st place, gold medalist(s)	Cuba	Idalia Hechavarría, Damaris Anderson, Dainelki Pérez, Liliana Allen	44.11	
2nd place, silver medalist(s)	Colombia	Mirtha Brock, Felipa Palacios, Patricia Rodríguez, Sandra Borrero	44.17	
3rd place, bronze medalist(s)	Brazil	Cleide Amaral, Maria Magnólia Figueiredo, Lucimar de Moura, Kátia Regina Santos	44.59	
4	Puerto Rico	Eileen Torres, Joyce Meléndez, Xiomara Dávila, Elaine Torres	45.68	
5	Mexico	Ruth Grajeda, Esther González, Mayra González, Claudia Moctezuma	45.93	

=== 4 × 400 meters relay ===
May 12

Rank	Nation	Competitors	Time	Notes
1st place, gold medalist(s)	Colombia	Patricia Rodríguez, Norfalia Carabalí, Flor Robledo, Ximena Restrepo	3:33.69	
2nd place, silver medalist(s)	Brazil	Maria Magnólia Figueiredo, Fátima dos Santos, Marlene da Silva, Luciana Mendes	3:34.34	
3rd place, bronze medalist(s)	Mexico	Ana Guevara, Alejandra Quintanar, Claudia Moctezuma, Mayra González	3:38.48	
	Cuba		DQ	

=== 10,000 meters walk ===
May 11

Rank	Name	Nationality	Time	Notes
1st place, gold medalist(s)	Gianetti Bonfim	Brazil	48:15.67	
2nd place, silver medalist(s)	Abigail Sáenz	Mexico	48:38.04	
3rd place, bronze medalist(s)	Geovana Irusta	Bolivia	48:56.22	
4	Bertha Vera	Ecuador	49:06.04	
5	Cristina Bohórquez	Colombia	49:20.12	
6	Liliana Bermeo	Colombia	49:21.05	
7	Ivonne Varas	Mexico	49:57.84	
8	Shirley Morejón	Bolivia	50:30.01	
9	Oslaidis Cruz	Cuba	50:34.26	
10	Nailze Pazim	Brazil	50:56.26	

=== High jump ===
May 10

Rank	Name	Nationality	Result	Notes
1st place, gold medalist(s)	Orlane dos Santos	Brazil	1.86	
2nd place, silver medalist(s)	Niurka Lussón	Cuba	1.83	
3rd place, bronze medalist(s)	Alejandra García	Argentina	1.83	
3rd place, bronze medalist(s)	Juana Arrendel	Dominican Republic	1.83	
5	Yanisleidis Fernández	Cuba	1.80	
6	Solange Witteveen	Argentina	1.80	
7	Alejandra Chomalí	Chile	1.75	
8	Luciane Dambacher	Brazil	1.75	
9	Fernanda Mosquera	Colombia	1.70	
10	Janeth Lagoyette	Colombia	1.60	

=== Long jump ===
May 11

Rank	Name	Nationality	Result	Notes
1st place, gold medalist(s)	Lissete Cuza	Cuba	6.57	
2nd place, silver medalist(s)	Maurren Maggi	Brazil	6.26	
3rd place, bronze medalist(s)	Luciana dos Santos	Brazil	6.24	
4	Andrea Ávila	Argentina	6.22	
5	Alejandra García	Argentina	6.16	
6	Ismaris Baró	Cuba	5.77	
7	Gilda Massa	Peru	5.76	
8	Elisa Pérez	Dominican Republic	5.62	
9	María Flishmann	Guatemala	5.59	

=== Triple jump ===
May 12

Rank	Name	Nationality	Result	Notes
1st place, gold medalist(s)	Yamilé Aldama	Cuba	14.39	CR
2nd place, silver medalist(s)	Magdelín Martínez	Cuba	14.17w	
3rd place, bronze medalist(s)	Maria de Souza	Brazil	13.49w	
4	Milli Figueroa	Colombia	12.76	
5	Elisa Pérez	Dominican Republic	12.60w	
6	Clara Córdoba	Colombia	12.56w	
7	Adriana Matoso	Brazil	12.48	
8	María Flishmann	Guatemala	12.28w	
9	Citlali Sainz	Mexico	11.70w	
	Gilda Massa	Peru	NM	

=== Shot put ===
May 11

Rank	Name	Nationality	Result	Notes
1st place, gold medalist(s)	Herminia Fernández	Cuba	18.05	
2nd place, silver medalist(s)	Elisângela Adriano	Brazil	17.90	
3rd place, bronze medalist(s)	Alexandra Amaro	Brazil	15.60	
4	Clara Palacios	Colombia	14.09	
5	Bertha Gómez	Colombia	13.46	
6	Datza Valcarcel	Puerto Rico	12.98	

=== Discus throw ===
May 12

Rank	Name	Nationality	Result	Notes
1st place, gold medalist(s)	Olga Gómez	Cuba	58.48	
2nd place, silver medalist(s)	Elisângela Adriano	Brazil	57.10	
3rd place, bronze medalist(s)	Marlene Sánchez	Cuba	55.50	
4	María Isabel Urrutia	Colombia	52.96	
5	Liliana Martinelli	Argentina	51.94	
6	Fátima Germano	Brazil	50.74	
7	Clara Palacios	Colombia	46.24	
8	Eva Dimas	El Salvador	43.30	
9	Ana Lucía Espinoza	Guatemala	35.34	

=== Hammer throw ===
May 10

Rank	Name	Nationality	Result	Notes
1st place, gold medalist(s)	María Eugenia Villamizar	Colombia	57.76	
2nd place, silver medalist(s)	Norbi Balantén	Cuba	53.80	
3rd place, bronze medalist(s)	Amarilis Mesa	Cuba	52.50	
4	Karina Moya	Argentina	50.56	
5	Zulma Lambert	Argentina	49.52	
6	Maria Inês Pacheco	Brazil	47.72	
7	Violeta Guzmán	Mexico	47.68	
8	Margit Wahlbrink	Brazil	44.40	
9	Eva Dimas	El Salvador	43.86	
10	Karina Córdova	Peru	41.18	
11	Cándida Asencio	Dominican Republic	40.72	
12	Ana Lucía Espinoza	Guatemala	39.18	

=== Javelin throw ===
May 10

Rank	Name	Nationality	Result	Notes
1st place, gold medalist(s)	Sonia Bisset	Cuba	64.54	
2nd place, silver medalist(s)	Odelmys Palma	Cuba	63.32	
3rd place, bronze medalist(s)	Zuleima Araméndiz	Colombia	56.24	
4	Carla Bispo	Brazil	51.12	
5	Verónica Prieto	Colombia	49.64	
6	Marieta Riera	Venezuela	49.14	
7	Marisela Robles	Dominican Republic	48.98	
8	Alessandra Resende	Brazil	47.08	
9	Isabel Ordóñez	Ecuador	43.58	

=== Heptathlon ===
May 10–11

The highest mark recorded in each event is highlighted in yellow

Rank	Athlete	Nationality	100m H	HJ	SP	200m	LJ	JT	800m	Points	Notes
1st place, gold medalist(s)	Orisis Pedroso	Cuba	14.2	1.89	11.37	25.22w	5.71	36.76	2:17.99	5715w	
2nd place, silver medalist(s)	Euzinete dos Reis	Brazil	14.2	1.71	11.01	25.10w	5.90	41.66	2:27.96	5495w	
3rd place, bronze medalist(s)	Zorobabelia Córdoba	Colombia	14.6	1.53	13.27	25.19w	5.43	46.24	2:40.60	5165w	
4	Sónia Machado	Portugal	14.1	1.50	9.72	25.54w	6.00	26.08	2:24.63	4916w	
5	Sheila Acosta	Puerto Rico	14.4	1.53	11.08	24.91w	5.36	33.20	2:32.93	4894w	
6	Mónica Sousa	Portugal	14.7	1.53	11.30	26.05w	5.36	36.58	2:34.86	4808w	
	Alexandra Dumas	Brazil	15.5	1.50	13.01	26.47w	4.81	DNS	–	DNF	
