= 1990 World Junior Championships in Athletics – Women's 4 × 400 metres relay =

The women's 4x400 metres relay event at the 1990 World Junior Championships in Athletics was held in Plovdiv, Bulgaria, at Deveti Septemvri Stadium on 11 and 12 August.

== Medalists ==
Gold	Sophie Scamps; Renée Poetschka; Kylie Hanigan; Sue Andrews; Australia
Silver	Claudine Williams; Winsome Cole; Inez Turner; Catherine Scott; Jamaica
Bronze	Yojani Casanova; Julia Duporty; Odalmis Limonta; Nancy McLeón; Cuba

== Results ==
=== Final ===
12 August

Rank	Nation	Competitors	Time	Notes
1st place, gold medalist(s)	Australia	Sophie Scamps; Renée Poetschka; Kylie Hanigan; Sue Andrews	3:30.38	Oceania U20 Record Australian U20 Record
2nd place, silver medalist(s)	Jamaica	Claudine Williams; Winsome Cole; Inez Turner; Catherine Scott	3:31.09	
3rd place, bronze medalist(s)	Cuba	Yojani Casanova; Julia Duporty; Odalmis Limonta; Nancy McLeón	3:31.81	
4	East Germany	Manuela Derr; Berit Junker; Anja Rücker; Wiebke Steffen	3:32.37	
5	Soviet Union	Natalya Sniga; Larisa Popova; Irina Skvarchevskaya; Nelli Voronkova	3:33.33	
6	United States	Roslyn Mack; Indira Hamilton; Barbara Selkridge; Steffanie Smith	3:35.49	
7	West Germany	Heike Oppermann; Silvia Steimle; Tanja Schnabel; Sandra Kuschmann	3:38.66	
	Nigeria	Charity Opara; Omolade Akinremi; Rita Onyebuchi; Fatima Yusuf	DQ(141.2)	

=== Heats ===
11 August

==== Heat 1 ====
Rank	Nation	Competitors	Time	Notes
1	Jamaica	Marjorie Bailey; Inez Turner; Claudine Williams; Catherine Scott	3:33.50	Q
2	Australia	Sophie Scamps; Renée Poetschka; Kylie Hanigan; Sue Andrews	3:33.81	Q
3	United States	Roslyn Mack; Barbara Selkridge; Adrienne Ashton; Steffanie Smith	3:34.57	q
4	Cuba	Yojani Casanova; Julia Duporty; Odalmis Limonta; Nancy McLeón	3:35.44	q
5	West Germany	Petra Maschmann; Silvia Steimle; Tanja Schnabel; Sandra Kuschmann	3:36.32	q
6	Bulgaria	Mariana Tsvetkova; Maria Taneva; Pavlina Neycheva; Stefka Mineva	3:47.61	

==== Heat 2 ====
Rank	Nation	Competitors	Time	Notes
1	Nigeria	Charity Opara; Omolade Akinremi; Rita Onyebuchi; Fatima Yusuf	3:33.56	Q
2	Soviet Union	Yana Burtasenkova; Irina Skvarchevskaya; Natalya Sniga; Nelli Voronkova	3:34.81	Q
3	East Germany	Kerstin Mickel; Berit Junker; Wiebke Steffen; Anja Rücker	3:37.73	q
4	Yugoslavia	Ivana Bartolić; Aleksandra Rus; Mirjana Šola; Marjana Lužar	3:38.81	
5	Canada	Karen Clarke; Julie Cote; Nadine Halliday; Cheryl Allen	3:38.95	

== Participation ==
According to an unofficial count, 49 athletes from 11 countries participated in the event.

- Australia (4)
- Bulgaria (4)
- Canada (4)
- Cuba (4)
- East Germany (5)
- Jamaica (5)
- Nigeria (4)
- Soviet Union (5)
- United States (5)
- West Germany (5)
- Yugoslavia (4)
