= Athletics at the 1995 Pan American Games – Women's 4 × 400 metres relay =

Women's 4 × 400 metres relay at the Pan American Games

The women's 4 × 400 metres relay event at the 1995 Pan American Games was held at the Estadio Atletico "Justo Roman" on 25 March.

== Results ==
Rank	Nation	Athletes	Time	Notes
1st place, gold medalist(s)	Cuba	Surella Morales, Nancy McLeón, Idalmis Bonne, Julia Duporty	3:27.45	
2nd place, silver medalist(s)	United States	Tonya Williams, Flirtisha Harris, Crystal Irving, Terri Dendy	3:31.22	
3rd place, bronze medalist(s)	Colombia	Elia Mera, Patricia Rodríguez, Felipa Palacios, Mirtha Brock	3:38.54	
4	Argentina	Gabriela Fornaciari, Sandra Izquierdo, Daniela Lebreo, Olga Conte	3:46.46	
	Brazil	Kátia Regina Santos, Elisângela Adriano, Alexandra Amaro, Luciana de Paula Mendes	DQ	
