= Athletics at the 1995 Pan American Games – Women's 4 × 100 metres relay =

Women's 4 × 100 metres relay at the Pan American Games

The women's 4 × 100 metres relay event at the 1995 Pan American Games was held at the Estadio Atletico "Justo Roman" on 25 March.

== Results ==
Rank	Nation	Athletes	Time	Notes
1st place, gold medalist(s)	United States	Shantel Twiggs, Richelle Webb, Flirtisha Harris, Chryste Gaines	43.55	
2nd place, silver medalist(s)	Cuba	Miriam Ferrer, Aliuska López, Dainelky Pérez, Liliana Allen	44.08	
3rd place, bronze medalist(s)	Colombia	Elia Mera, Felipa Palacios, Patricia Rodríguez, Mirtha Brock	44.10	
4	Jamaica	Jennifer Powell, Dahlia Duhaney, Donnette Brown, Kerry-Ann Richards	44.36	
5	Argentina	Verónica Depaoli, Olga Conte, Daniela Lebreo, Virginia Lebreo	46.01	
6	Chile	Alejandra Martínez, Carmen Bezanilla, Lisette Rondón, Monica Castro	46.31	
