= Athletics at the 1995 Pan American Games – Women's 200 metres =

Women's 200 metres at the Pan American Games

The women's 200 metres event at the 1995 Pan American Games was held at the Estadio Atletico "Justo Roman" on 21 and 22 March.

== Medalists ==
Gold	Silver	Bronze
Liliana Allen; Cuba	Dahlia Duhaney; Jamaica	Omegia Keeys; United States

== Results ==
=== Heats ===
Wind:
Heat 1: +0.9 m/s, Heat 2: +1.0 m/s, Heat 3: +2.0 m/s

Rank	Heat	Name	Nationality	Time	Notes
1	1	Liliana Allen	Cuba	22.99	Q
2	2	Dahlia Duhaney	Jamaica	23.10	Q
3	2	Omegia Keeys	United States	23.23	Q
4	3	Julia Duporty	Cuba	23.27	Q
5	1	Eldece Clarke	Bahamas	23.35	Q
6	2	Felipa Palacios	Colombia	23.35	q
7	2	Heather Samuel	Antigua and Barbuda	23.48	q
8	3	Hydie Harper	Trinidad and Tobago	23.54	Q
9	1	Richelle Webb	United States	23.59	
10	1	Cleide Amaral	Brazil	23.66	
11	1	Olga Conte	Argentina	23.81	
12	2	Lisette Rondón	Chile	23.84	NR
13	2	Ameerah Bello	United States Virgin Islands	23.95	
14	3	Kátia Regina Santos	Brazil	24.08	
15	3	Daniela Lebreo	Argentina	24.37	
16	1	Donnette Brown	Jamaica	24.69	
17	3	Marcia Daniel	Dominica	25.43	

=== Final ===
Wind: +0.7 m/s

Rank	Name	Nationality	Time	Notes
1st place, gold medalist(s)	Liliana Allen	Cuba	22.73	
2nd place, silver medalist(s)	Dahlia Duhaney	Jamaica	23.03	
3rd place, bronze medalist(s)	Omegia Keeys	United States	23.24	
4	Julia Duporty	Cuba	23.44	
5	Eldece Clarke	Bahamas	23.45	
6	Felipa Palacios	Colombia	23.46	
7	Heather Samuel	Antigua and Barbuda	23.67	
8	Hydie Harper	Trinidad and Tobago	23.78	
