= Athletics at the 1996 Summer Olympics – Women's 4 × 400 metres relay =

Women's 4 × 400 metres relay at the Games of the XXVI Olympiad
- Venue: Centennial Olympic Stadium
- Date: 2 August 1996 (heats); 3 August 1996 (final)
- Competitors: 59 from 14 nations
- Teams: 59
- Winning time: 3:20.91

Medalists
| 1st place, gold medalist(s) | | Rochelle Stevens, Maicel Malone-Wallace, Kim Graham, Jearl Miles, Linetta Wilson* | United States |
| 2nd place, silver medalist(s) | | Olabisi Afolabi, Fatima Yusuf, Charity Opara, Falilat Ogunkoya | Nigeria |
| 3rd place, bronze medalist(s) | | Uta Rohländer, Linda Kisabaka, Anja Rücker, Grit Breuer * Athletes who participated in the heats only and received medals. | Germany |

These are the official results of the Women's 4 × 400 m Relay event at the 1996 Summer Olympics in Atlanta, Georgia. There were 15 nations competing.

In the penultimate race ever in Centennial Stadium, Olabisi Afolabi put Nigeria out in front, with Merlene Frazer very close at the handoff. Fatima Yusuf extended the Nigerian lead out to about 8 metres, Handing off in sixth place, Maicel Malone brought USA into second place, but Russian Svetlana Goncharenko, starting her leg in fifth place, followed Malone and overtook her on the final straight. With Nigeria comfortably in front, the second exchange saw the field bunch as the next six teams exchanged within a couple of steps of one another. Coming out of the scrum, Russia maintained second place followed by USA, while Cuba's Surella Morales found herself flat on her face before the end of the first turn. Down the backstretch Kim Graham ran USA past Russia's Yekaterina Kulikova, while Jamaica's Juliet Campbell ran wide to stay out of trouble, but opened the door for Germany's Anja Rücker to join the chase. Through the second turn, back from her drug suspension, Charity Opara's lead began to shrink as Graham began to separate from the pack. Under the challenge, Opara began to tie up, Graham cruised by to hand off to Jearl Miles with a 4-metre advantage. Nigeria's bronze medalist Falilat Ogunkoya chased Miles leaving Jamaica's hurdle gold medalist Deon Hemmings to battle Germany's drug cheat Grit Breuer. Campbell closed quickly to give Hemmings the edge over Breuer, but Ogunkoya made it clear she was not going to battle for bronze, putting a gap on Hemmings and Breuer quickly from the pass. Ogunkoya's focus was on Miles, gaining steadily until the final straight, reducing the gap to less than a metre. Miles was gritting her teeth, trying to hold off Ogunkoya. Coming off the turn, she looked to be struggling as Ogunkoya gained, Miles drifting into lane 2 to give Ogunkoya the direct route to victory. But Miles didn't let her by, holding the edge all the way to the finish line for American gold. Behind them, Hemmings held the advantage over Breuer until the final straight, then Breuer unleashed a sprint that left Hemmings and was nipping at Ogunkoya's heels, giving the German team the bronze.

== Results ==
=== Heats ===
Qualification: First 3 in each heat (Q) and the next 2 fastest (q) qualified to the final.

| Rank | Heat | Nation | Athletes | Time | Notes |
|---|---|---|---|---|---|
| 1 | 1 | United States | Linetta Wilson, Maicel Malone, Kim Graham, Maicel Malone | 3:22.71 | Q |
| 2 | 1 | Nigeria | Bisi Afolabi, Fatima Yusuf, Charity Opara, Falilat Ogunkoya | 3:23.24 | Q |
| 3 | 2 | Germany | Uta Rohländer, Linda Kisabaka, Anja Rücker, Grit Breuer | 3:24.08 | Q |
| 4 | 2 | Cuba | Idalmis Bonne, Julia Duporty, Surella Morales, Ana Fidelia Quirot | 3:24.23 | Q |
| 5 | 2 | Russia | Tatyana Chebykina, Olga Kotlyarova, Yekaterina Kulikova, Svetlana Goncharenko | 3:24.86 | Q |
| 6 | 2 | Jamaica | Juliet Campbell, Tracey Ann Barnes, Merlene Frazer, Inez Turner | 3:25.33 | q |
| 7 | 2 | Czech Republic | Naděžda Koštovalová, Ludmila Formanová, Helena Fuchsová, Hana Benešová | 3:26.82 | q |
| 8 | 1 | France | Francine Landre, Viviane Dorsile, Evelyne Elien, Elsa de Vassoigne | 3:28.07 | Q |
| 9 | 1 | Great Britain | Phylis Smith, Allison Curbishley, Donna Fraser, Georgina Oladapo | 3:28.13 | |
| 10 | 1 | Ukraine | Viktoriya Fomenko, Liudmyla Koshchey, Yana Manuylova, Olha Moroz | 3:28.16 | |
| 11 | 2 | Australia | Lee Naylor, Kylie Hanigan, Melinda Gainsford-Taylor, Renee Poetschka | 3:33.78 | |
| 12 | 2 | Saint Kitts and Nevis | Bernadeth Prentice, Diane Francis, Valma Bass, Tamara Wigley | 3:35.12 | NR |
| 13 | 1 | Antigua and Barbuda | Dine Potter, Sonia Williams, Charmaine Thomas, Heather Samuel | 3:44.98 | |
| | 1 | India | Beenamol Mathew, Rosa Kutty Kunnath Chacko, Jyotirmoyee Sikdar, Shiny Wilson | DQ | |
| | 1 | Virgin Islands | | DNS | |

=== Final ===
| Rank | Lane | Nation | Athletes | Time | Notes |
|---|---|---|---|---|---|
| 1st place, gold medalist(s) | 3 | United States | Rochelle Stevens, Maicel Malone, Kim Graham, Jearl Miles | 3:20.91 | |
| 2nd place, silver medalist(s) | 6 | Nigeria | Bisi Afolabi, Fatima Yusuf, Charity Opara, Falilat Ogunkoya | 3:21.04 | |
| 3rd place, bronze medalist(s) | 5 | Germany | Uta Rohländer, Linda Kisabaka, Anja Rücker, Grit Breuer | 3:21.14 | |
| 4 | 8 | Jamaica | Merlene Frazer, Sandie Richards, Juliet Campbell, Deon Hemmings | 3:21.69 | |
| 5 | 2 | Russia | Tatyana Chebykina, Svetlana Goncharenko, Yekaterina Kulikova, Olga Kotlyarova | 3:22.22 | |
| 6 | 4 | Cuba | Idalmis Bonne, Julia Duporty, Surella Morales, Ana Fidelia Quirot | 3:25.85 | |
| 7 | 7 | Czech Republic | Naděžda Koštovalová, Ludmila Formanová, Helena Fuchsová, Hana Benešová | 3:26.99 | |
| 8 | 1 | France | Francine Landre, Viviane Dorsile, Evelyne Elien, Elsa de Vassoigne | 3:28.46 | |

== See also ==
- Men's 4 × 400 m Relay
