= Athletics at the 1993 Summer Universiade – Women's 200 metres =

The women's 200 metres event at the 1993 Summer Universiade was held at the UB Stadium in Buffalo, United States with the final on 17 July 1993.

== Medalists ==
| Gold | Silver | Bronze |
|---|---|---|
| Flirtisha Harris; United States | Dahlia Duhaney; Jamaica | Wang Huei-chen; Chinese Taipei |

== Results ==
=== Heats ===
| Rank | Heat | Athlete | Nationality | Time | Notes |
|---|---|---|---|---|---|
| 1 | 2 | Flirtisha Harris | United States | 22.94 | Q |
| 2 | 2 | Yuliya Mukhetdinova | Russia | 23.13 | Q |
| 3 | 5 | Kim Graham | United States | 23.21 | Q |
| 4 | 3 | Wang Huei-chen | Chinese Taipei | 23.35 | Q |
| 5 | 3 | Liliana Allen | Cuba | 23.46 | Q |
| 6 | 3 | Stacey Bowen | Canada | 23.47 | q |
| 7 | 3 | Georgette Nkoma | Cameroon | 23.51 | q |
| 8 | 5 | Faith Idehen | Nigeria | 23.72 | Q |
| 8 | 5 | Chandra Sturrup | Bahamas | 23.72 | q |
| 10 | 1 | Dahlia Duhaney | Jamaica | 23.73 | Q |
| 11 | 5 | Giada Gallina | Italy | 23.84 | q |
| 12 | 4 | Zlatka Georgieva | Bulgaria | 23.90 | Q |
| 13 | 2 | Melanie Neef | Great Britain | 23.91 | q |
| 14 | 1 | Marina Filipović | Yugoslavia | 23.99 | Q |
| 15 | 1 | Christine Harrison-Bloomfield | Great Britain | 24.14 | q |
| 16 | 2 | Hanitriniaina Rakotondrabé | Madagascar | 24.23 | |
| 16 | 4 | Lou Ann Williams | Trinidad and Tobago | 24.23 | Q |
| 18 | 1 | Katerina Koffa | Greece | 24.25 | |
| 19 | 4 | France Gareau | Canada | 24.29 | |
| 20 | 4 | Cristina Regalo | Portugal | 24.44 | |
| 21 | 2 | Mireia Ruiz | Spain | 24.55 | |
| 22 | 5 | Natália Moura | Portugal | 24.57 | |
| 23 | 3 | Zenia Ayrton | India | 24.72 | |
| 24 | 2 | Kao Yu-chuan | Chinese Taipei | 24.78 | |
| 25 | 4 | Natalya Gridasova | Kazakhstan | 24.91 | |
| 26 | 4 | Patricia Morales | Spain | 25.24 | |
| 27 | 1 | Sandra Petersen | South Africa | 25.40 | |
| 28 | 1 | Amrei Baumgarten | Guatemala | 26.67 | |
| 29 | 2 | Chi Phung Thi Kim | Vietnam | 27.11 | |
| 30 | 3 | Grace Batson | Guyana | 27.99 | |
| 31 | 2 | Fatima Zafar | Pakistan | 30.08 | |

=== Semifinals ===
| Rank | Heat | Athlete | Nationality | Time | Notes |
|---|---|---|---|---|---|
| 1 | 2 | Flirtisha Harris | United States | 22.90 | Q |
| 2 | 1 | Wang Huei-chen | Chinese Taipei | 23.06 | Q |
| 3 | 1 | Kim Graham | United States | 23.10 | Q |
| 4 | 1 | Liliana Allen | Cuba | 23.12 | Q |
| 5 | 2 | Dahlia Duhaney | Jamaica | 23.17 | Q |
| 6 | 1 | Yuliya Mukhetdinova | Russia | 23.26 | Q |
| 7 | 2 | Georgette Nkoma | Cameroon | 23.28 | Q |
| 8 | 2 | Zlatka Georgieva | Bulgaria | 23.50 | Q |
| 9 | 1 | Giada Gallina | Italy | 23.60 | |
| 10 | 1 | Stacey Bowen | Canada | 23.62 | |
| 11 | 2 | Faith Idehen | Nigeria | 23.69 | |
| 12 | 2 | Chandra Sturrup | Bahamas | 23.75 | |
| 13 | 2 | Marina Filipović | Yugoslavia | 23.87 | |
| 14 | 2 | Christine Harrison-Bloomfield | Great Britain | 23.97 | |
| 15 | 1 | Lou Ann Williams | Trinidad and Tobago | 24.00 | |
| 16 | 1 | Melanie Neef | Great Britain | 24.00 | |

=== Final ===
Wind: +3.2 m/s

| Rank | Athlete | Nationality | Time | Notes |
|---|---|---|---|---|
| 1st place, gold medalist(s) | Flirtisha Harris | United States | 22.56 | |
| 2nd place, silver medalist(s) | Dahlia Duhaney | Jamaica | 22.79 | |
| 3rd place, bronze medalist(s) | Wang Huei-chen | Chinese Taipei | 22.80 | |
| 4 | Kim Graham | United States | 22.82 | |
| 5 | Liliana Allen | Cuba | 22.90 | |
| 6 | Yuliya Mukhetdinova | Russia | 23.26 | |
| 7 | Zlatka Georgieva | Bulgaria | 23.50 | |
| 8 | Georgette Nkoma | Cameroon | 24.04 | |
