= 1995 IAAF World Indoor Championships – Women's 4 × 400 metres relay =

The women's 4 × 400 metres relay event at the 1995 IAAF World Indoor Championships was held on 12 March.

== Results ==
Rank	Nation	Athletes	Time	Notes
1st place, gold medalist(s)	Russia	Tatyana Chebykina, Yelena Ruzina, Yekaterina Kulikova, Svetlana Goncharenko	3:29.29	
2nd place, silver medalist(s)	Czech Republic	Naděžda Koštovalová, Helena Dziurová, Hana Benešová, Ludmila Formanová	3:30.27	
3rd place, bronze medalist(s)	United States	Nelrae Pasha, Tanya Dooley, Kim Graham, Flirtisha Harris	3:31.43	
4	Great Britain	Melanie Neef, Susan Earnshaw, Allison Curbishley, Stephanie McCann	3:35.39	
5	China	Lu Xifang, Ma Yuqin, Cao Chunying, Zhang Hengyun	3:39.76	AR
	Jamaica		DNS	
