= Nancy McLeón =

Cuban sprinter

Personal information
- Born: May 1, 1971 (age 55) Banes, Cuba
Medal record
Women's Athletics
Representing Cuba
Pan American Games
Gold medal – first place	1995 Mar del Plata	4 × 400 m relay
Silver medal – second place	1991 Havana	4 × 400 m relay
Central American and Caribbean Games
Gold medal – first place	1990 Mexico City	4x400m relay
Gold medal – first place	1993 Ponce	4x400m relay
Bronze medal – third place	1990 Mexico City	400 m
Bronze medal – third place	1993 Ponce	400 m
Summer Universiade
Silver medal – second place	1993 Buffalo	4x400m relay
Silver medal – second place	1997 Catania	4x400m relay
Bronze medal – third place	1993 Buffalo	400 m
CAC Junior Championships (U20)
Gold medal – first place	1990 Havana	400 m
Gold medal – first place	1990 Havana	4 × 400 m relay
Gold medal – first place	1988 Nassau	400 m

Nancy McLeón Ferrer (born May 1, 1971) is a retired female track and field athlete from Cuba who competed in the sprint events during her career.

She won the gold medal in the women's 4 × 400 metres relay at the 1995 Pan American Games, alongside teammates Idalmis Bonne, Surella Morales and Julia Duporty.

== International competitions ==
Year	Competition	Venue	Position	Event	Notes
Representing Cuba
1988	Central American and Caribbean Junior Championships (U-20)	Nassau, Bahamas	1st	400 m	54.22
1988	World Junior Championships	Sudbury, Canada	25th (h)	400 m	55.47
1988	World Junior Championships	Sudbury, Canada	10th (h)	4 × 400 m relay	3:43.18
1989	Universiade	Duisburg, West Germany	–	400 m	DQ
1989	Universiade	Duisburg, West Germany	4th	4 × 400 m relay	3:34.53
1990	Central American and Caribbean Junior Championships (U-20)	Havana, Cuba	1st	400 m	53.31
1990	Central American and Caribbean Junior Championships (U-20)	Havana, Cuba	1st	4 × 400 m relay	3:37.12
1990	World Junior Championships	Plovdiv, Bulgaria	6th	400m	53.58
1990	World Junior Championships	Plovdiv, Bulgaria	3rd	4 × 400 m relay	3:31.81
1990	Central American and Caribbean Games	Mexico City, Mexico	3rd	400 m	55.29
1990	Central American and Caribbean Games	Mexico City, Mexico	1st	4 × 400 m relay	3:36.27
1991	Pan American Games	Havana, Cuba	8th	400 m	54.19
1991	Pan American Games	Havana, Cuba	2nd	4 × 400 m relay	3:24.91
1991	World Championships	Tokyo, Japan	7th (qf)	400 m	53.72
1991	World Championships	Tokyo, Japan	5th (sf)	4 × 400 m relay	3:31.43
1993	Universiade	Buffalo, United States	3rd	400 m	52.84
1993	Universiade	Buffalo, United States	2nd	4 × 400 m relay	3:28.95
1993	Central American and Caribbean Games	Ponce, Puerto Rico	3rd	400 m	52.59
1993	Central American and Caribbean Games	Ponce, Puerto Rico	1st	4 × 400 m relay	3:31.27
1994	Goodwill Games	St. Petersburg, Russia	3rd	4 × 400 m relay	3:26.35
1995	Pan American Games	Mar del Plata, Argentina	2nd	400 m	51.81
1995	Pan American Games	Mar del Plata, Argentina	1st	4 × 400 m relay	3:27.45
1995	World Championships	Gothenburg, Sweden	5th (sf)	400 m	51.46
1995	World Championships	Gothenburg, Sweden	7th	4 × 400 m relay	3:29.27
