= Athletics at the 1993 Summer Universiade – Women's 4 × 100 metres relay =

The men's 4 × 100 metres relay event at the 1993 Summer Universiade was held at the UB Stadium in Buffalo, United States on 18 July 1993.

== Results ==
Rank	Nation	Athletes	Time	Notes
1st place, gold medalist(s)	United States	Crystal Braddock, Cheryl Taplin, Flirtisha Harris, Chryste Gaines	43.37	
2nd place, silver medalist(s)	Nigeria	Mary Tombiri, Faith Idehen, Christy Opara, Beatrice Utondu	44.25	
3rd place, bronze medalist(s)	Canada	Keturah Anderson, Dionne Wright, Dena Burrows, France Gareau	45.20	
4	Germany	Katrin Bartschat, Petra Hassinger, Mona Steigauf, Birgit Gautzsch	46.08	
	Cuba	Liliana Allen, Esther Duporty, Oraidis Ramírez, Idalmis Bonne	DQ	
	Great Britain	Melanie Neef, Christine Harrison-Bloomfield, Keri Maddox, Sam Baker	DNF	
	Jamaica		DNS	
