= Athletics at the 1991 Pan American Games – Women's 4 × 400 metres relay =

Women's 4 × 400 metres relay at the Pan American Games

The women's 4 × 400 metres relay event at the 1991 Pan American Games was held in Havana, Cuba on 11 August.

== Results ==
| Rank | Nation | Athletes | Time | Notes |
|---|---|---|---|---|
| 1st place, gold medalist(s) | United States | Natasha Kaiser, Tasha Downing, Maicel Malone, Jearl Miles | 3:24.21 | |
| 2nd place, silver medalist(s) | Cuba | Julia Duporty, Odalmis Limonta, Nancy McLeón, Ana Fidelia Quirot | 3:24.91 | |
| 3rd place, bronze medalist(s) | Jamaica | Vivienne Spence-Gardner, Cathy Rattray-Williams, Sandie Richards, Inez Turner | 3:28.33 | |
| 4 | Colombia | Ángela Mancilla, Norfalia Carabalí, Maribelcy Peña, Ximena Restrepo | 3:31.39 | NR |
| 5 | Canada | Camille Noel, Karen Clarke, Janette Wood, Cheryl Allen | 3:34.07 | |
| 6 | Uruguay | Inés Justet, Soledad Acerenza, Estela Abel, Claudia Acerenza | 3:50.93 | |
