= Athletics at the 1991 Pan American Games – Women's 100 metres =

Women's 100 metres at the Pan American Games

The women's 100 metres event at the 1991 Pan American Games was held in Havana, Cuba with the final on 4 and 5 August.

== Medalists ==
Gold	Silver	Bronze
Liliana Allen; Cuba	Chryste Gaines; United States	Beverly McDonald; Jamaica

== Results ==
=== Heats ===
Wind:
Heat 1: -1.3 m/s, Heat 2: +0.8 m/s

Rank	Heat	Name	Nationality	Time	Notes
1	2	Liliana Allen	Cuba	11.33	Q
2	2	Chryste Gaines	United States	11.43	Q
3	2	Dahlia Duhaney	Jamaica	11.52	Q
4	1	Beverly McDonald	Jamaica	11.62	Q
5	2	Claudete Alves Pina	Brazil	11.72	q
6	1	Anita Howard	United States	11.75	Q
7	1	Idalmis Bonne	Cuba	11.77	Q
8	2	Stacey Bowen	Canada	11.80	q
9	1	María Quiñónez	Colombia	11.88	
10	1	Karen Clarke	Canada	11.92	
11	2	Margarita Martirena	Uruguay	12.22	
	1	Marinett Flowers	Belize	DNS	
	2	Jacqueline Staine	Belize	DNS	

=== Final ===
Wind: +0.4 m/s

Rank	Name	Nationality	Time	Notes
1st place, gold medalist(s)	Liliana Allen	Cuba	11.39	
2nd place, silver medalist(s)	Chryste Gaines	United States	11.46	
3rd place, bronze medalist(s)	Beverly McDonald	Jamaica	11.52	
4	Dahlia Duhaney	Jamaica	11.62	
5	Anita Howard	United States	11.70	
6	Stacey Bowen	Canada	11.82	
7	Claudete Alves Pina	Brazil	11.87	
8	Idalmis Bonne	Cuba	11.88	
