= Athletics at the 1995 Pan American Games – Women's 400 metres =

Women's 400 metres at the Pan American Games

The women's 400 metres event at the 1995 Pan American Games was held at the Estadio Atletico "Justo Roman" on 18 and 19 March.

== Medalists ==
Gold	Silver	Bronze
Julia Duporty; Cuba	Nancy McLeón; Cuba	Flirtisha Harris; United States

== Results ==
=== Heats ===
Rank	Heat	Name	Nationality	Time	Notes
1	2	Julia Duporty	Cuba	52.43	Q
2	1	Ximena Restrepo	Colombia	52.65	Q
3	1	Nancy McLeón	Cuba	53.05	Q
3	2	Patricia Rodríguez	Colombia	53.05	Q
5	2	Crystal Irving	United States	53.10	Q
6	1	Flirtisha Harris	United States	53.65	Q
7	2	Maria Magnólia Figueiredo	Brazil	53.71	q
8	2	Claudine Williams	Jamaica	55.27	q
9	1	Olga Conte	Argentina	55.32	
10	1	Luciana de Paula Mendes	Brazil	55.56	
11	2	Ameerah Bello	United States Virgin Islands	55.65	
12	1	Shermaine Ross	Grenada	56.02	
13	1	Ana Traña	Nicaragua	1:02.45	
	1	Rochelle Thomas	British Virgin Islands	DNS	
	2	Ana Comaschi	Argentina	DNS	

=== Final ===
Rank	Name	Nationality	Time	Notes
1st place, gold medalist(s)	Julia Duporty	Cuba	50.77	
2nd place, silver medalist(s)	Nancy McLeón	Cuba	51.81	
3rd place, bronze medalist(s)	Flirtisha Harris	United States	52.51	
4	Crystal Irving	United States	52.69	
5	Patricia Rodríguez	Colombia	52.97	
6	Maria Magnólia Figueiredo	Brazil	53.10	
7	Claudine Williams	Jamaica	53.63	
	Ximena Restrepo	Colombia	DNS	
