= Olga Conte =

Argentine sprinter

Personal information
- Full name: Olga Beatriz Conte
- Born: 7 April 1966 (age 60)

Sport
- Sport: Athletics
- Event(s): 200 metres, 400 metres

Olga Beatriz Conte (born 7 April 1966) is a retired Argentine sprinter specialising in the 200 and 400 metres. She represented her country at the 1991 and 1997 World Championships. In addition she won multiple medals on continental level.

== International competitions ==
| Year | Competition | Venue | Position | Event | Notes |
Representing Argentina
| 1987 | South American Championships | São Paulo, Brazil | 7th | 200 m | 24.60 |
| 1987 | South American Championships | São Paulo, Brazil | 6th | 400 m | 56.2 |
| 1987 | South American Championships | São Paulo, Brazil | 1st | 4 × 100 m relay | 245.45 |
| 1987 | South American Championships | São Paulo, Brazil | 2nd | 4 × 400 m relay | 23:43.56 |
| 1988 | Ibero-American Championships | Mexico City, Mexico | 9th (h) | 200 m | 24.31 |
| 1988 | Ibero-American Championships | Mexico City, Mexico | 11th (h) | 400 m | 55.37 |
| 1988 | Ibero-American Championships | Mexico City, Mexico | 4th | 4 × 100 m relay | 46.32 |
| 1988 | Ibero-American Championships | Mexico City, Mexico | 6th | 4 × 400 m relay | 3:42.17 |
| 1989 | South American Championships | Medellín, Colombia | 4th | 100 m | 11.6 |
| 1989 | South American Championships | Medellín, Colombia | 1st | 200 m | 23.33 |
| 1989 | South American Championships | Medellín, Colombia | 2nd | 400 m | 53.47 |
| 1990 | Ibero-American Championships | Manaus, Brazil | 3rd | 200 m | 23.96 |
| 1990 | Ibero-American Championships | Manaus, Brazil | 3rd | 400 m | 53.85 |
| 1990 | Ibero-American Championships | Manaus, Brazil | 4th | 4 × 400 m relay | 3:44.2 |
| 1990 | South American Games | Lima, Peru | 1st | 200 m | 25.24 |
| 1990 | South American Games | Lima, Peru | 1st | 4 × 100 m relay | 55.03 |
| 1991 | World Championships | Tokyo, Japan | 28th (h) | 200 m | 24.97 |
| 1993 | South American Championships | Lima, Peru | 3rd | 200 m | 24.7 |
| 1993 | South American Championships | Lima, Peru | 2nd | 4 × 100 m relay | 45.9 |
| 1993 | South American Championships | Lima, Peru | 2nd | 4 × 400 m relay | 3:43.42 |
| 1994 | Ibero-American Championships | Medellín, Colombia | 10th (h) | 200 m | 25.98 |
| 1994 | Ibero-American Championships | Medellín, Colombia | 6th | 400 m | 60.12 |
| 1994 | Ibero-American Championships | Medellín, Colombia | 4th | 4 × 100 m relay | 46.97 |
| 1995 | Pan American Games | Mar del Plata, Argentina | 11th (h) | 200 m | 23.81 |
| 1995 | Pan American Games | Mar del Plata, Argentina | 9th (h) | 400 m | 55.32 |
| 1995 | Pan American Games | Mar del Plata, Argentina | 5th | 4 × 100 m relay | 46.01 |
| 1995 | Pan American Games | Mar del Plata, Argentina | 5th | 4 × 1400 m relay | 3:46.46 |
| 1996 | Ibero-American Championships | Medellín, Colombia | 4th | 200 m | 23.45 |
| 1996 | Ibero-American Championships | Medellín, Colombia | 4th | 400 m | 52.95 |
| 1997 | South American Championships | Mar del Plata, Argentina | 3rd | 200 m | 23.90 |
| 1997 | South American Championships | Mar del Plata, Argentina | 1st | 400 m | 53.41 |
| 1997 | South American Championships | Mar del Plata, Argentina | 3rd | 4 × 100 m relay | 46.18 |
| 1997 | South American Championships | Mar del Plata, Argentina | 3rd | 4 × 400 m relay | 3:40.72 |
| 1997 | World Championships | Athens, Greece | 38th (h) | 400 m | 55.82 |

== Personal bests ==
=== Outdoor ===
- 100 metres – 11.95 (+0.8 m/s, Buenos Aires 1997)
- 200 metres – 23.45 (+1.1 m/s, Medellín 1996)
- 400 metres – 52.50 (Buenos Aires 1997) NR
