= Elia Mera =

Colombian sprinter

Personal information
- Full name: Elia Manuela Mera
- Born: 27 July 1966 (age 59)

Sport
- Sport: Athletics
- Event(s): 100 m, 200 m, 400 m
Medal record
Representing Colombia
Pan American Games
Bronze medal – third place	1995 Mar del Plata	4x100m relay
Bronze medal – third place	1995 Mar del Plata	4x400m relay
Central American and Caribbean Games
Silver medal – second place	1993 Ponce	4x100m relay
Silver medal – second place	1993 Ponce	4x400m relay
South American Games
Gold medal – first place	1994 Valencia	4x400m relay
Silver medal – second place	1994 Valencia	4x100m relay

Elia Manuela Mera (born 27 July 1966) is a retired Colombian sprinter. She represented her country at the 1995 World Championships in two relay events.

== International competitions ==
Year	Competition	Venue	Position	Event	Notes
Representing Colombia
1985	Bolivarian Games	Cuenca, Ecuador	1st	100 m	12.45
1985	Bolivarian Games	Cuenca, Ecuador	1st	4 × 100 m relay	47.89
1985	Bolivarian Games	Cuenca, Ecuador	1st	4 × 400 m relay	3:58.22
1987	Central American and Caribbean Championships	Caracas, Venezuela	3rd	4 × 400 m relay	3:34.29
1987	Pan American Games	Indianapolis, United States	15th (h)	100 m	12.02
1987	Pan American Games	Indianapolis, United States	4th	4 × 100 m relay	45.94
1989	Bolivarian Games	Maracaibo, Venezuela	1st	4 × 100 m relay	45.29
1991	South American Championships	Manaus, Brazil	4th	100 m	12.15
1991	South American Championships	Manaus, Brazil	2nd	4 × 100 m relay	45.00
1993	Bolivarian Games	Cochabamba, Bolivia	3rd	100 m	12.16
1993	Bolivarian Games	Cochabamba, Bolivia	3rd	200 m	24.68
1993	Bolivarian Games	Cochabamba, Bolivia	1st	4 × 100 m relay	44.80
1993	Bolivarian Games	Cochabamba, Bolivia	1st	4 × 400 m relay	3:42.41
1993	Central American and Caribbean Championships	Cali, Colombia	3rd	4 × 400 m relay	3:34.29
1993	Central American and Caribbean Games	Ponce, Puerto Rico	10th (h)	100 m	12.54
1993	Central American and Caribbean Games	Ponce, Puerto Rico	2nd	4 × 100 m relay	44.62
1993	Central American and Caribbean Games	Ponce, Puerto Rico	2nd	4 × 400 m relay	3:36.82
1994	Ibero-American Championships	Mar del Plata, Argentina	3rd	400 m	55.33
1994	Ibero-American Championships	Mar del Plata, Argentina	1st	4 × 100 m relay	44.87
1994	Ibero-American Championships	Mar del Plata, Argentina	1st	4 × 400 m relay	3:35.35
1994	South American Games	Valencia, Venezuela	2nd	400 m	54.08
1994	South American Games	Valencia, Venezuela	1st	4 × 400 m relay	3:40.33
1995	Pan American Games	Mar del Plata, Argentina	3rd	4 × 100 m relay	44.10
1995	Pan American Games	Mar del Plata, Argentina	3rd	4 × 400 m relay	3:38.54
1995	World Championships	Gothenburg, Sweden	7th	4 × 100 m relay	44.61
1995	World Championships	Gothenburg, Sweden	–	4 × 400 m relay	DNF
