= Julia Duporty =

Cuban sprinter (born 1971)

Personal information
- Born: February 9, 1971 (age 55) Guantánamo, Cuba

Sport
- Sport: Track and field
Medal record
Women's athletics
Representing Cuba
Pan American Games
Gold medal – first place	1995 Mar del Plata	400m
Gold medal – first place	1995 Mar del Plata	4x400m relay
Gold medal – first place	1999 Winnipeg	4x400m relay
Silver medal – second place	1991 Havana	4x400m relay
Central American and Caribbean Games
Gold medal – first place	1990 Mexico City	4x100m relay
Gold medal – first place	1990 Mexico City	4x400m relay
Gold medal – first place	1993 Ponce	400m
Gold medal – first place	1993 Ponce	4x100m relay
Gold medal – first place	1993 Ponce	4x400m relay
Gold medal – first place	1998 Maracaibo	4x400m relay
Summer Universiade
Silver medal – second place	1997 Catania	4x400m relay
World Junior Championships
Bronze medal – third place	1990 Plovdiv	4x400m relay
CAC Junior Championships (U20)
Gold medal – first place	1988 Nassau	4 × 100 m relay
Silver medal – second place	1990 Havana	200 m
Silver medal – second place	1990 Havana	4 × 100 m relay

Esther Julia "Daysi" Duporty Torres (born February 9, 1971, in Guantánamo) is a retired sprinter from Cuba, who competed at three consecutive Summer Olympics, starting in 1992. She set her personal best (50.61) in the women's 400 metres event on 6 September 1994 in Madrid.

== Career ==
Duporty had success as a young athlete at the Central American and Caribbean Junior Championships, where she was runner-up in the women's 200 m behind Revoli Campbell in 1990. She began competing at the top level of athletics in 1991: after winning a silver medal with the Cuban 4 × 400 metres women's relay team at the 1991 Pan American Games, she competed at the 1991 World Championships in Athletics. She reached the semi-finals of the 200 m and she was sixth in the 4 × 100 metres relay, forming part of a team with Pan American champion Liliana Allen. She made her first Olympic appearance at the 1992 Summer Olympics in the relay, but the team was disqualified in the event.

She stepped up a distance at the 1993 Central American and Caribbean Games, winning the gold medal over 400 metres as well as the 400 m relay title with Cuba. She also won the 200 m bronze medal at the 1993 CAC Championships (which was won by fellow Cuban Idalmis Bonne). She helped the Cuban team to sixth place again at the 1993 World Championships in Athletics, this time setting a Cuban record of 42.89 seconds.

The 1994 season did not feature a major championships, but she picked up medals elsewhere: she took the relay bronze after coming fifth in the individual 400 m at the 1994 IAAF World Cup and won two further relay medals at the 1994 Goodwill Games. She was a semi-finalist in the 400 m at the 1995 World Championships in Athletics, but it was at the 1995 Pan American Games where she excelled, winning the 400 m individual and relay titles as well as coming fourth in the 200 m. She took part in her second Olympic relay at the 1996 Summer Olympics and helped the Cuban team to sixth place in the 4×400 m final. At the 1996 Ibero-American Championships, she became the 400 m champion with a winning run of 50.84 seconds.

She regained her 400 m and relay titles at the 1997 CAC Championships. At the 1998 Ibero-American Championships she won the 200 m bronze behind Lucrécia Jardim and Liliana Allen. In the final years of her international career, she was confined to the relay races at the major championships. She won the gold with the Cuban 4×400 m relay team at the 1999 Pan American Games and seventh in the final at the 1999 World Championships in Athletics. In her third and final Olympic appearance she finished eighth in the women's 400 m relay.

Duporty won the Cuban title over 400 m on five occasions between 1994 and 2000 – a streak interrupted only by Ana Fidelia Quirot in 1996 and Zulia Calatayud in 1999.

== International competitions ==
Year	Competition	Venue	Position	Event	Notes
Representing Cuba
1988	CAC Junior Championships (U-20)	Nassau, Bahamas	5th	200 m	25.19 (-0.3 m/s)
1988	CAC Junior Championships (U-20)	Nassau, Bahamas	1st	4 × 100 m relay	46.76
1989	Universiade	Duisburg, West Germany	5th	4 × 100 m relay	44.73
1990	CAC Junior Championships (U-20)	Havana, Cuba	4th	100 m	11.92 (-0.4 m/s)
1990	CAC Junior Championships (U-20)	Havana, Cuba	2nd	200 m	23.80 (-0.5 m/s)
1990	CAC Junior Championships (U-20)	Havana, Cuba	2nd	4 × 100 m relay	45.64
1990	World Junior Championships	Plovdiv, Bulgaria	8th	200 m	23.91 (+1.3 m/s)
1990	World Junior Championships	Plovdiv, Bulgaria	3rd	4 × 400 m relay	3:31.81
1990	Central American and Caribbean Games	Mexico City, Mexico	6th	100 m	11.99 (w)
1990	Central American and Caribbean Games	Mexico City, Mexico	1st	4 × 100 m relay	44.54
1990	Central American and Caribbean Games	Mexico City, Mexico	1st	4 × 400 m relay	3:36.27
1991	Pan American Games	Havana, Cuba	2nd	4 × 400 m relay	3:24.91
1991	World Championships	Tokyo, Japan	6th (sf)	200 m	23.58 (-3.4 m/s)
1991	World Championships	Tokyo, Japan	6th	4 × 100 m relay	43.75
1992	Ibero-American Championships	Seville, Spain	5th	400m	53.80
1992	Ibero-American Championships	Seville, Spain	1st	4 × 400 m relay	3:33.43
1992	Olympic Games	Barcelona, Spain	—	4 × 400 m relay	DSQ
1993	Central American and Caribbean Championships	Cali, Colombia	3rd	4 × 100 m relay	44.64
1993	Central American and Caribbean Championships	Cali, Colombia	2nd	4 × 400 m relay	3:28.95
1993	Universiade	Buffalo, United States	–	4 × 100 m relay	DQ
1993	World Championships	Stuttgart, Germany	6th	4 × 100 m relay	42.89 NR
1993	World Championships	Stuttgart, Germany	—	4 × 400 m relay	DNF
1993	Central American and Caribbean Games	Ponce, Puerto Rico	1st	400 m	51.81
1993	Central American and Caribbean Games	Ponce, Puerto Rico	1st	4 × 100 m relay	44.59
1993	Central American and Caribbean Games	Ponce, Puerto Rico	1st	4 × 400 m relay	3:31.27
1994	IAAF World Cup	London, United Kingdom	5th	400 m	52.48
1994	IAAF World Cup	London, United Kingdom	3rd	4 × 400 m relay	3:27.91
1995	Pan American Games	Mar del Plata, Argentina	4th	200 m	23.44
1995	Pan American Games	Mar del Plata, Argentina	1st	400 m	50.77
1995	Pan American Games	Mar del Plata, Argentina	1st	4 × 400 m relay	3:27.45
1995	World Championships	Gothenburg, Sweden	5th (sf)	400 m	51.85
1995	World Championships	Gothenburg, Sweden	7th	4 × 400 m relay	3:29.27
1996	Ibero-American Championships	Medellín, Colombia	1st	400 m	50.84
1996	Olympic Games	Atlanta, United States	6th	4 × 400 m relay	3:25.85
1997	Central American and Caribbean Championships	San Juan, Puerto Rico	1st	400 m	51.96
1997	Central American and Caribbean Championships	San Juan, Puerto Rico	1st	4 × 400 m relay	3:29.30
1997	Universiade	Catania, Italy	2nd	4 × 400 m relay	3:29.00
1998	Ibero-American Championships	Lisbon, Portugal	3rd	200 m	23.52
1998	Ibero-American Championships	Lisbon, Portugal	4th	4 × 400 m relay	3:34.46
1998	Central American and Caribbean Games	Maracaibo, Venezuela	7th	200 m	23.95
1998	Central American and Caribbean Games	Maracaibo, Venezuela	5th	400 m	52.51
1998	Central American and Caribbean Games	Maracaibo, Venezuela	1st	4 × 400 m relay	3:29.65
1999	Pan American Games	Winnipeg, Canada	1st	4 × 400 m relay	3:26.70
1999	World Championships	Seville, Spain	7th	4 × 400 m relay	3:29.19
2000	Olympic Games	Sydney, Australia	8th	4 × 400 m relay	3:29.47
