= Nelrae Pasha =

American sprinter (born 1970)

Nelrae Pasha (born October 28, 1970) is an American sprinter. At the 1995 IAAF World Indoor Championships, she won third place in the 4 × 400 m relay, along with her teammates Flirtisha Harris, Tanya Dooley, and Kim Graham. She graduated from Georgia Institute of Technology and, as of 2018, works as a financial advisor in the Jacksonville, Florida area.
