= Dahlia Duhaney =

Jamaican sprinter (born 1970)

Personal information
- Born: 20 July 1970 (age 55)

Sport
- Sport: Track and field
- Club: LSU Tigers
Medal record
Women's athletics
Representing Jamaica
World Championships
| Gold medal – first place | 1991 Tokyo | 4 × 100 m relay |
| Silver medal – second place | 1995 Gothenburg | 4 × 100 m relay |
Pan American Games
| Gold medal – first place | 1991 Havana | 4 × 100 m |
| Silver medal – second place | 1995 Mar de Plata | 200 m |
Summer Universiade
| Gold medal – first place | 1993 Buffalo | 100 m |
| Silver medal – second place | 1993 Buffalo | 200 m |
CARIFTA Games Junior (U20)
| Gold medal – first place | 1988 Kingston | Long Jump |
CARIFTA Games Youth (U17)
| Gold medal – first place | 1985 Bridgetown | Long Jump |
| Silver medal – second place | 1986 Les Abymes | Long Jump |
| Bronze medal – third place | 1984 Nassau | Long Jump |

Dahlia Duhaney (born 20 July 1970) is a Jamaican retired sprinter who competed for her native country at the 1992 Summer Olympics in Barcelona, Spain. She won the world title in the women's 4 × 100 m relay at the 1991 IAAF World Championships in Tokyo, Japan, alongside Juliet Cuthbert, Beverly McDonald and Merlene Ottey.

Duhaney ran track collegiately at Louisiana State University.

== International competitions ==
| Year | Competition | Venue | Position | Event | Notes |
Representing Jamaica
| 1988 | World Junior Championships | Sudbury, Canada | 16th (q) | Long jump | 5.93 m (+1.4 m/s) |
| 1991 | Pan American Games | Havana, Cuba | 4th | 100 m | 11.62 |
| 1991 | Pan American Games | Havana, Cuba | 6th | 200 m | 23.77 |
| 1991 | Pan American Games | Havana, Cuba | 1st | 4 × 100 m | 43.79 |
| 1991 | World Championships | Tokyo, Japan | 1st | 4 × 100 m | 41.94 |
| 1992 | Olympic Games | Barcelona, Spain | — | 4 × 100 m | DNF |
| 1993 | Summer Universiade | Buffalo, United States | 1st | 100 m | 11.56 |
| 1993 | Summer Universiade | Buffalo, United States | 2nd | 200 m | 22.79 w |
| 1994 | Commonwealth Games | Victoria, Canada | 5th | 100 m | 11.34 |
| 1994 | Commonwealth Games | Victoria, Canada | 6th | 200 m | 22.85 |
| 1994 | Commonwealth Games | Victoria, Canada | 4th | 4 × 100 m | 43.51 |
| 1995 | Pan American Games | Mar del Plata, Argentina | 2nd | 200 m | 23.03 |
| 1995 | Pan American Games | Mar del Plata, Argentina | 4th | 4 × 100 m | 44.36 |
| 1995 | World Championships | Gothenburg, Sweden | 2nd | 4 × 100 m | 42.25 |
