= Luciana Mendes =

Brazilian middle-distance runner

Personal information
- Born: 26 July 1971 (age 54) Rio de Janeiro, Brazil

Sport
- Sport: Track and field
Medal record
Representing Brazil
Pan American Games
Silver medal – second place	1995 Mar del Plata	800m
South American Games
Gold medal – first place	1994 Valencia	800m
Bronze medal – third place	1994 Valencia	400m

Luciana de Paula Mendes (born 26 July 1971) is a retired Brazilian athlete who competed predominantly in the 400 and 800 metres. She represented her country at the 1996 and 2004 Summer Olympics reaching the semifinals on the second occasion. She also won multiple medals at the continental level.

Her 800 and 1000 metres personal bests are the current national records.

== Competition record ==
Year	Competition	Venue	Position	Event	Notes
Representing Brazil
1988	South American Junior Championships	Cubatão, Brazil	1st	400 m	55.49
1988	South American Junior Championships	Cubatão, Brazil	1st	4 × 400 m relay	3:41.52
1989	South American Junior Championships	Montevideo, Uruguay	2nd	400 m	55.49
1989	South American Junior Championships	Montevideo, Uruguay	1st	4 × 400 m relay	3:40.7
1989	Pan American Junior Championships	Santa Fe, Argentina	7th	400 m	55.28
1989	Pan American Junior Championships	Santa Fe, Argentina	3rd	4 × 400 m relay	3:40.87
1990	South American Junior Championships	Bogotá, Colombia	1st	400 m	54.85
1990	South American Junior Championships	Bogotá, Colombia	1st	4 × 400 m relay	3:45.12
1991	South American Championships	Manaus, Brazil	2nd	800 m	2:04.44
1991	South American Championships	Manaus, Brazil	1st	4 × 400 m relay	3:32.59
1992	Ibero-American Championships	Seville, Spain	5th (h)	400m	54.90
1992	Ibero-American Championships	Seville, Spain	7th	800m	2:07.02
1993	South American Championships	Lima, Peru	2nd	400 m	53.06
1993	South American Championships	Lima, Peru	2nd	800 m	2:04.5
1993	South American Championships	Lima, Peru	1st	4 × 400 m relay	3:36.49
1993	World Championships	Stuttgart, Germany	24th (h)	800 m	2:03.55
1994	World Cup	London, United Kingdom	2nd	800 m	2:00.13
1994	South American Games	Valencia, Venezuela	3rd	400 m	54.72
1994	South American Games	Valencia, Venezuela	1st	800 m	2:01.99
1995	Pan American Games	Mar del Plata, Argentina	10th (h)	400 m	55.56
1995	Pan American Games	Mar del Plata, Argentina	2nd	800 m	2:01.71
1995	Pan American Games	Mar del Plata, Argentina	–	4 × 400 m relay	DQ
1995	South American Championships	Manaus, Brazil	2nd	400 m	2:03.56
1995	World Championships	Gothenburg, Sweden	21st (h)	800 m	2:01.82
1996	Ibero-American Championships	Medellín, Colombia	9th (h)	400 m	55.44
1996	Ibero-American Championships	Medellín, Colombia	2nd	4 × 400 m relay	3:34.34
1996	Olympic Games	Atlanta, United States	16th (h)	800 m	2:00.25
1997	South American Championships	Mar del Plata, Argentina	1st	800 m	2:03.56
1997	South American Championships	Mar del Plata, Argentina	2nd	4 × 400 m relay	3:38.18
1997	World Championships	Athens, Greece	6th (sf)	800 m	1:59.45
1999	South American Championships	Bogotá, Colombia	1st	800 m	2:05.62
1999	South American Championships	Bogotá, Colombia	2nd	4 × 400 m relay	3:37.88
2000	Ibero-American Championships	Rio de Janeiro, Brazil	3rd	400 m	53.18
2000	Ibero-American Championships	Rio de Janeiro, Brazil	1st	800 m	2:01.77
2001	South American Championships	Manaus, Brazil	1st	400 m	52.76
2001	South American Championships	Manaus, Brazil	1st	800 m	2:00.04
2001	South American Championships	Manaus, Brazil	1st	4 × 400 m relay	3:32.43
2001	World Championships	Edmonton, Canada	8th (sf)	800 m	2:01.94
2003	South American Championships	Barquisimeto, Venezuela	1st	800 m	2:02.06
2003	Pan American Games	Santo Domingo, Dominican Republic	5th	800 m	2:05.52
2003	Pan American Games	Santo Domingo, Dominican Republic	8th	1500 m	4:21.80
2004	Ibero-American Championships	Huelva, Spain	5th	800 m	2:03.36
2004	Olympic Games	Athens, Greece	21st (sf)	800 m	2:02.00

== Personal bests ==
- 400 metres – 52.76 (Manaus 2001)
- 600 metres – 1:25.05 (Liège 2004)
- 800 metres – 1:58.27 (Hechtel 1994)
- 1000 metres – 2:36.30 (Brussels 1995)
- 1500 metres – 4:20.81 (São Paulo 2003)
