= Tanya Dooley =

American sprinter

Tanya Dooley-Ehlert (born May 8, 1972) is an American sprinter. At the 1995 IAAF World Indoor Championships, she won third place in the 4 × 400 m relay, along with her teammates Flirtisha Harris, Nelrae Pasha, and Kim Graham. Dooley also competed in the 4 × 400 m relay at the 1991 Pan American Junior Athletics Championships, in which her team earned second place.

Dooley was an All-American sprinter for the Fresno State Bulldogs track and field team, finishing 3rd in the 400 m at the 1994 NCAA Division I Indoor Track and Field Championships.

Dooley later became an assistant coach for the Fresno State track team.
