= Flirtisha Harris =

American sprinter (born 1972)

Personal information
- Born: February 21, 1972 (age 54) Prince Frederick, Maryland, United States

Sport
- Sport: Track and field
- Club: Seton Hall Pirates
Medal record
Representing United States
World Indoor Championships
Bronze medal – third place	1995 Barcelona	4x400m relay
Summer Universiade
Gold medal – first place	1993 Buffalo	200m
Gold medal – first place	1993 Buffalo	4x100m relay
Pan American Games
Gold medal – first place	1995 Mar del Plata	4x100m relay
Silver medal – second place	1995 Mar del Plata	4x400m relay
Bronze medal – third place	1995 Mar del Plata	400m

Flirtisha Harris (born February 21, 1972) is an American sprinter. She won first place in the 200 m and the 4 × 100 m relay race at the 1993 Summer Universiade. At the 1995 IAAF World Indoor Championships, she was a bronze medalist in the 4 × 400 m relay, along with her teammates Nelrae Pasha, Tanya Dooley, and Kim Graham. In the 1995 Pan American Games, Harris came in third in the 400 m, first in the 4x100 relay, and second in the 4 × 400 m relay. Harris attended Seton Hall University where she was named 1992 female athlete of the year, and she won the NCAA championships indoor and outdoor 400 m races in 1994.

== Competition record ==
Year	Competition	Venue	Position	Event	Time	Wind (m/s)	Notes
Representing United States
1993	Summer Universiade	Buffalo, New York	1st	200 m	22.56	+3.2	
1993	Summer Universiade	Buffalo, New York	1st	4 × 100 m relay	43.37	—N/a	
1994	IAAF World Cup	London, England	5th	4 × 100 m relay	43.79	—N/a	
1994	IAAF World Cup	London, England	5th	4 × 400 m relay	3:30.99	—N/a	
1995	IAAF World Indoor Championships	Barcelona, Spain	3rd	4 × 400 m relay	3:31.43	—N/a	
1995	Pan American Games	Mar del Plata, Argentina	3rd	400 m	52.51		
1995	Pan American Games	Mar del Plata, Argentina	1st	4 × 100 m relay	43.55	—N/a	
1995	Pan American Games	Mar del Plata, Argentina	2nd	4 × 400 m relay	3:31.22	—N/a	
