= Olha Moroz =

Ukrainian sprinter (born 1970)

Personal information
- Nationality: Ukrainian
- Born: 16 August 1970 (age 55)

Sport
- Sport: Sprinting
- Event: 4 × 400 metres relay

Olha Moroz (born 16 August 1970) is a Ukrainian sprinter. She competed in the women's 4 × 400 metres relay at the 1996 Summer Olympics.
