= Kátia Regina Santos =

Brazilian sprinter

Personal information
- Born: 31 December 1967 (age 58) Salvador, Bahia, Brazil

Sport
- Sport: Track and field
Medal record
Representing Brazil
South American Games
Silver medal – second place	1994 Valencia	100m
Bronze medal – third place	1994 Valencia	200m

Kátia Regina de Jesús Santos (born 31 December 1967) is a former Brazilian athlete who specialised in the sprinting events. She represented her country in the 4 × 100 metres relay at the 2004 Summer Olympics narrowly missing the final.

She has personal bests of 11.42 seconds in the 100 metres (2000) and 23.33 seconds in the 200 metres (2002).

== Competition record ==
Year	Competition	Venue	Position	Event	Notes
Representing Brazil
1993	South American Championships	Lima, Peru	3rd	100 m	12.22
1993	South American Championships	Lima, Peru	2nd	200 m	24.6
1993	South American Championships	Lima, Peru	1st	4 × 100 m relay	45.1
1994	Ibero-American Championships	Mar del Plata, Argentina	4th	100 m	12.02
1994	Ibero-American Championships	Mar del Plata, Argentina	3rd	200m	23.77 w
1994	Ibero-American Championships	Mar del Plata, Argentina	2nd	4 × 100 m relay	46.03
1994	South American Games	Valencia, Venezuela	2nd	100 m	11.54
1994	South American Games	Valencia, Venezuela	3rd	200 m	23.9
1995	Pan American Games	Mar del Plata, Argentina	12th (h)	100 m	11.76
1995	Pan American Games	Mar del Plata, Argentina	14th (h)	200 m	24.08
1995	Pan American Games	Mar del Plata, Argentina	–	4 × 400 m relay	DQ
1995	South American Championships	Manaus, Brazil	3rd	100 m	11.52
1995	South American Championships	Manaus, Brazil	1st	200 m	23.34
1995	South American Championships	Manaus, Brazil	1st	4 × 100 m relay	44.97
1995	World Championships	Gothenburg, Sweden	41st (h)	100 m	11.68
1996	Ibero-American Championships	Medellín, Colombia	5th	100 m	11.76
1996	Ibero-American Championships	Medellín, Colombia	8th (h)	200 m	24.33
1996	Ibero-American Championships	Medellín, Colombia	3rd	4 × 100 m relay	44.59
1997	South American Championships	Mar del Plata, Argentina	4th	100 m	11.88
1997	South American Championships	Mar del Plata, Argentina	6th	200 m	24.75
1997	South American Championships	Mar del Plata, Argentina	2nd	4 × 100 m relay	45.21
1997	World Championships	Athens, Greece	12th (h)	4 × 100 m relay	43.89
1998	Ibero-American Championships	Lisbon, Portugal	3rd	100 m	11.62
1998	Ibero-American Championships	Lisbon, Portugal	7th	200 m	24.16
1999	South American Championships	Bogotá, Colombia	3rd	100 m	11.59
2000	Ibero-American Championships	Rio de Janeiro, Brazil	3rd	4 × 100 m relay	44.13
2001	South American Championships	Manaus, Brazil	1st	4 × 100 m relay	44.32
2002	Ibero-American Championships	Guatemala City, Guatemala	4th	200 m	23.77
2002	Ibero-American Championships	Guatemala City, Guatemala	1st	4 × 100 m relay	44.28
2004	South American U23 Championships	Barquisimeto, Venezuela	2nd	4 × 100 m relay	43.49
2004	Ibero-American Championships	Huelva, Spain	3rd	4 × 100 m relay	44.13
2004	Olympic Games	Athens, Greece	9th (h)	4 × 100 m relay	43.12
