= Jorge Castellón =

Bolivian sprinter (born 1969)

Jorge Castellón Velarde (born 7 February 1969) is a former Bolivian sprinter who competed in the men's 100m competition at the 1996 Summer Olympics. He recorded a 10.74, not enough to qualify for the next round past the heats. His personal best is 10.65, set in 1996.
