= Yekaterina Kulikova =

Russian sprinter

Personal information
- Nationality: Russian
- Born: 3 May 1968 (age 57)

Sport
- Sport: Sprinting
- Event: 4 × 400 metres relay

Yekaterina Kulikova (born 3 May 1968) is a Russian sprinter. She competed in the women's 4 × 400 metres relay at the 1996 Summer Olympics.
