= Terri Dendy =

American sprinter

Personal information
- Born: May 8, 1965 (age 61) Wilmington, Delaware, United States

Sport
- Sport: Track and field
- Club: George Mason Patriots
Medal record
Representing United States
World Championships
Gold medal – first place	1993 Stuttgart	4x400m relay
World Indoor Championships
Silver medal – second place	1993 Toronto	4x400m relay
Bronze medal – third place	1991 Seville	4x400m relay
Summer Universiade
Gold medal – first place	1989 Duisburg	4x400m relay
Pan American Games
Silver medal – second place	1995 Mar del Plata	4x400m relay

Terri Dendy (born May 8, 1965) is a former American track and field athlete from Wilmington, Delaware. Dendy was ranked among the top ten women in the U.S. for the 400 meters event from 1986 through 1989 and again in 1993. She was an alternate on the U.S. 4 × 400 meters relay team at the 1988 Summer Olympics.

Dendy graduated from Concord High School, where she set a state record in the 400 meters. She continued her career at George Mason University, where she set school records indoors at 300 meters (38.77), 400 meters (52.57), 500 meters (1:11.45) and outdoors 400 meters (51.45). Dendy was a semi-finalist in the 200 meters event at the 1989 World Indoor Championships, running 23.75 seconds.

In 1993, at the World Indoor Championships in Toronto, Dendy won a silver medal in the 4 × 400 m relay. Outdoors, she also won a silver medal at the World Championships in Stuttgart, where she ran in the heats of the 4 × 400 m relay but not the final.

Dendy was inducted into the Delaware Sports Hall of Fame in 2012.

Her sister Dionne Jones-Dendy was also a track and field athlete, and her nephew Marquis Dendy is an American champion in the long jump. She now works as the athletic director at Northwestern High School in Hyattsville, Maryland.
