= Cleide Amaral =

Brazilian sprinter (born 1967)

Personal information
- Born: 17 July 1967 (age 58) Campo Limpo Paulista, Brazil

Sport
- Sport: Track and field
Medal record
Representing Brazil
Pan American Games
Bronze medal – third place	1987 Indianapolis	4x100m relay

Cleide Amaral (born 17 July 1967) is a retired Brazilian athlete who specialised in the sprinting events. She represented her country at the 1996 Summer Olympics, as well as 1993, 1995 and 1997 World Championships. In addition, she won multiple medals on regional level.

Her personal best in the 100 metres is 11.38, set in 1995.

== Competition record ==
Year	Competition	Venue	Position	Event	Notes
Representing Brazil
1987	Pan American Games	Indianapolis, United States	12th (h)	200 m	25.10
1987	Pan American Games	Indianapolis, United States	3rd	4 × 100 m relay	45.37
1989	South American Championships	Medellín, Colombia	3rd	100 m	11.5 (A)
1989	South American Championships	Medellín, Colombia	1st	4 × 100 m relay	44.69
1990	Ibero-American Championships	Manaus, Brazil	2nd	100 m	11.61
1990	Ibero-American Championships	Manaus, Brazil	1st	4 × 100 m relay	44.60
1991	South American Championships	Manaus, Brazil	1st	4 × 100 m relay	44.87
1993	South American Championships	Lima, Peru	1st	100 m	11.91
1993	South American Championships	Lima, Peru	1st	4 × 100 m relay	45.1
1993	World Championships	Stuttgart, Germany	31st (qf)	100 m	11.68
1994	Ibero-American Championships	Mar del Plata, Argentina	1st	100 m	11.66
1994	Ibero-American Championships	Mar del Plata, Argentina	2nd	4 × 100 m relay	46.03
1995	Pan American Games	Mar del Plata, Argentina	100 m	9th (h)	11.60
1995	South American Championships	Manaus, Brazil	1st	100 m	11.38
1995	South American Championships	Manaus, Brazil	2nd	200 m	23.39
1995	South American Championships	Manaus, Brazil	1st	4 × 100 m relay	44.97
1995	World Championships	Gothenburg, Sweden	33rd (h)	100 m	11.57
1996	Ibero-American Championships	Medellín, Colombia	1st	100 m	11.48
1996	Ibero-American Championships	Medellín, Colombia	3rd	4 × 100 m relay	44.59
1996	Olympic Games	Atlanta, United States	41st (h)	100 m	11.76
1997	World Championships	Athens, Greece	12th (h)	4 × 100 m relay	43.89
1999	South American Championships	Bogotá, Colombia	3rd	200 m	23.74
2000	Ibero-American Championships	Rio de Janeiro, Brazil	2nd	4 × 100 m relay	45.16
