= Kim Graham =

American athlete and Olympic gold medallist

Personal information
- Full name: Kimberly Elaine Graham-Miller
- Born: Kimberly Elaine Graham; March 26, 1971 (age 55) Durham, North Carolina, U.S.
Medal record
Women's athletics
Representing the United States
Olympic Games
Gold medal – first place	1996 Atlanta	4 × 400 metres relay
World Championships
Gold medal – first place	1995 Gothenburg	4 × 400 metres relay
Silver medal – second place	1997 Athens	4 × 400 metres relay
World Indoor Championships
Bronze medal – third place	1995 Gothenburg	4 × 400 metres relay

Kimberly Elaine "Kim" Graham-Miller (born March 26, 1971, in Durham, North Carolina) is an American former sprinter who specialised in the 400 metres event. She represented the United States at the 1996 Summer Olympics in Atlanta, where she received a gold medal in women's 4 × 400 metres relay with Rochelle Stevens, Maicel Malone, and Jearl Miles, having run a very fast leg and passing a Nigerian team leading by several meters. She also competed in the women's 400 metres but did not advance past the semifinals. At the 1995 IAAF World Indoor Championships, she won third place in the 4 × 400 m relay, along with her teammates Nelrae Pasha, Tanya Dooley, and Flirtisha Harris.

In 2024, Graham was inducted into the Clemson Ring of Honor for her contributions to the Clemson Tigers track and field program as an athlete.

== Coaching career ==
Graham-Miller has coached at several NCAA Division I programs. She served as an assistant at Virginia and Duke, where she coached five All-Americans, three Atlantic Coast Conference champions and eight All-ACC athletes.

She then spent three seasons at UC Davis (2010–2013), helping the Aggies win two conference titles while coaching four individual Big West Conference champions. She also coached at the University of Illinois.

From 2014 to 2022, Graham-Miller was an assistant coach at Sacramento State, working with relay teams, sprinters and hurdlers. During her eight seasons with the Hornets, she helped coach the team to six Big Sky Conference titles and coached Shilah Bedingfield to honorable mention All-America honors in 2019.

On July 11, 2022, Graham-Miller was named head coach of the UC San Diego Tritons men's and women's track and field programs. She succeeded co-head coaches Tony Salerno and Darcy Ahner, who retired after nearly four decades on the La Jolla campus. Graham-Miller oversaw the program's final two years of transition to NCAA Division I.

In 2025, the Tritons' first season of full Division I postseason eligibility, Graham-Miller's program captured three individual Big West Conference championships and qualified five athletes for the first round of the NCAA Outdoor Track & Field Championships.
