= Kylie Hanigan =

Australian sprinter

Personal information
- Nationality: Australian
- Born: 18 November 1971 (age 53) Manly, New South Wales, Australia

Sport
- Sport: Sprinting
- Event: 4 × 100 metres relay

Kylie Hanigan (born 18 November 1971) is an Australian sprinter. She competed in the women's 4 × 100 metres relay at the 1996 Summer Olympics.
