= Odalmis Limonta =

Cuban sprinter

Personal information
- Full name: Odalmis Limonta Gorguet
- Born: 13 January 1972 (age 54) El Caney, Cuba
- Height: 1.79 m (5 ft 10 in)
- Weight: 66 kg (146 lb)

Sport
- Sport: Sprinting
- Event(s): 400 m, 800 m
Medal record
Representing Cuba
Summer Universiade
Silver medal – second place	1993 Buffalo	4x400m relay
Pan American Games
Silver medal – second place	1991 Havana	4x400m relay

Odalmis Limonta Gorguet (born 13 January 1972) is a Cuban sprinter. She competed in the women's 4 × 400 metres relay at the 1992 Summer Olympics.
