= Surella Morales =

Cuban sprinter

Personal information
- Nationality: Cuban
- Born: 16 June 1963 (age 63) Cerro, Havana, Cuba

Sport
- Sport: Sprinting
- Event: 4 × 400 metres relay
Medal record
Representing Cuba
Pan American Games
Gold medal – first place	1995 Mar del Plata	4x400m relay

Surella Morales Rosillo (born 16 June 1963) is a Cuban sprinter. She competed in the women's 4 × 400 metres relay at the 1996 Summer Olympics.
