= Fatima Yusuf =

Nigerian sprinter

Personal information
- Born: 2 May 1971 (age 55)
Medal record
Women's athletics
Representing Nigeria
Olympic Games
Silver medal – second place	1996 Atlanta	4x400 m
African Championships
Gold medal – first place	1989 Lagos	4×400 m
Gold medal – first place	1990 Cairo	200 m
Gold medal – first place	1990 Cairo	400 m
Gold medal – first place	1990 Cairo	4×100 m
Gold medal – first place	1990 Cairo	4×400 m
Silver medal – second place	1989 Lagos	400 m
Bronze medal – third place	2000 Algiers	200 m
World Junior Championships
Gold medal – first place	1990 Plovdiv	400 m

Fatima Yusuf-Olukoju (born 2 May 1971 in Owo, Ondo) is a retired Nigerian athlete who competed mainly in the 400 metres during her career. She won 400 metres race in the 1991 All-Africa Games and was second in the 200 metres race. She is married to Adewale Olukoju.

She later competed in the 200 meters at the World Championship in Spain where she ran 22.28. She is also the first African woman to run under 50 secs in the 400 meters. She ran 49.43 at the 1995 African Championship

She competed for Nigeria in the 1996 Summer Olympics held in Atlanta, United States in the 400 meters in which she placed 6th with the time of 49.77 and 4 x 400 metres where she won the Silver medal with her teammates Bisi Afolabi, Charity Opara and Falilat Ogunkoya behind host nation America. She attended Azusa Pacific University.
