= Idalmis Bonne =

Cuban sprinter (born 1971)

Personal information
- Born: February 2, 1971 (age 55) Guantánamo, Cuba
Medal record
Women's athletics
Representing Cuba
Pan American Games
| Gold medal – first place | 1995 Mar del Plata | 4 × 400 m |
| Gold medal – first place | 1999 Winnipeg | 4 × 400 m |
| Silver medal – second place | 1991 Havana | 4 × 100 m |
Summer Universiade
| Silver medal – second place | 1997 Catania | 4 × 400 m |
| Bronze medal – third place | 1997 Catania | 400 m |
CAC Junior Championships (U20)
| Silver medal – second place | 1990 Havana | 4 × 100 m relay |
| Bronze medal – third place | 1990 Havana | 200 m |

Idalmis Bonne Rousseaux (Spanish pronunciation: [iˈðalmis]; born February 2, 1971) is a retired Cuban sprinter.

== Career ==
Bonne, who was born in Guantánamo, claimed a gold medal at the 1995 Pan American Games in Mar del Plata, Argentina, and competed in three consecutive Summer Olympics, starting in 1992.

== Family ==
Bonne gave birth to a daughter, Daisurami Bonne, at the age of 17, who also became a sprinter. She won a gold medal in the relay at the 2011 Pan American Games.

== International competitions ==
| Year | Competition | Venue | Position | Event | Notes |
Representing Cuba
| 1990 | Central American and Caribbean Junior Championships (U-20) | Havana, Cuba | 5th | 100 m | 12.04 (-0.4 m/s) |
| 1990 | Central American and Caribbean Junior Championships (U-20) | Havana, Cuba | 3rd | 200 m | 24.18 (-0.5 m/s) |
| 1990 | Central American and Caribbean Junior Championships (U-20) | Havana, Cuba | 2nd | 4 × 100 m relay | 45.64 |
| 1991 | Universiade | Sheffield, United Kingdom | 6th | 100 m | 11.70 |
| 1991 | Pan American Games | Havana, Cuba | 8th | 100 m | 11.88 |
| 1991 | Pan American Games | Havana, Cuba | 4th | 200 m | 23.64 |
| 1991 | Pan American Games | Havana, Cuba | 2nd | 4 × 100 m relay | 44.31 |
| 1992 | Ibero-American Championships | Seville, Spain | 2nd | 200 m | 24.01 (-2.9 m/s) |
| 1992 | Ibero-American Championships | Seville, Spain | 1st | 4 × 100 m relay | 44.49 |
| 1992 | Olympic Games | Barcelona, Spain | — | 4 × 100 m relay | DNF |
| 1993 | Universiade | Buffalo, United States | – | 4 × 100 m relay | DQ |
| 1993 | Universiade | Buffalo, United States | 2nd | 4 × 400 m relay | 3:28.95 |
| 1993 | Central American and Caribbean Championships | Cali, Colombia | 3rd | 4 × 100 m relay | 44.64 |
| 1993 | Central American and Caribbean Championships | Cali, Colombia | 2nd | 4 × 400 m relay | 3:28.95 |
| 1993 | World Championships | Stuttgart, Germany | 6th (h) | 4 × 100 m relay | 43.48 |
| 1993 | Central American and Caribbean Games | Ponce, Puerto Rico | 2nd | 200 m | 23.53 |
| 1993 | Central American and Caribbean Games | Ponce, Puerto Rico | 1st | 4 × 400 m relay | 3:31.27 |
| 1994 | Goodwill Games | St. Petersburg, Russia | 3rd | 4 × 400 m relay | 3:26.35 |
| 1995 | Central American and Caribbean Championships | Guatemala City, Guatemala | 1st | 4 × 100 m relay | 44.41 |
| 1995 | Pan American Games | Mar del Plata, Argentina | 1st | 4 × 400 m relay | 3:27.45 |
| 1995 | World Championships | Gothenburg, Sweden | 31st (h) | 400 m | 52.10 |
| 1995 | World Championships | Gothenburg, Sweden | 7th | 4 × 400 m relay | 3:29.27 |
| 1996 | Ibero-American Championships | Medellín, Colombia | 2nd | 200 m | 23.07 |
| 1996 | Olympic Games | Atlanta, United States | 6th | 4 × 400 m relay | 3:25.85 |
| 1997 | Universiade | Catania, Italy | 3rd | 400 m | 51.72 |
| 1997 | Universiade | Catania, Italy | 2nd | 4 × 400 m relay | 3:29.00 |
| 1998 | Ibero-American Championships | Lisbon, Portugal | 4th | 4 × 400 m relay | 3:34.46 |
| 1998 | Central American and Caribbean Games | Maracaibo, Venezuela | 9th (h) | 400 m | 54.10 |
| 1998 | Central American and Caribbean Games | Maracaibo, Venezuela | 1st | 4 × 400 m relay | 3:29.65 |
| 1999 | Pan American Games | Winnipeg, Canada | 11th (h) | 400 m | 53.09 |
| 1999 | Pan American Games | Winnipeg, Canada | 1st | 4 × 400 m relay | 3:26.70 |
| 1999 | World Championships | Seville, Spain | 7th | 4 × 400 m relay | 3:29.19 |
| 2000 | Olympic Games | Sydney, Australia | 8th | 4 × 400 m relay | 3:29.47 |
