= Chryste Gaines =

American athlete (born 1970)

Personal information
- Full name: Chryste Dionne Gaines
- Born: September 14, 1970 (age 55) Lawton, Oklahoma, U.S.
- Height: 5 ft 7 in (170 cm)
- Weight: 126 lb (57 kg)
Medal record
Women's athletics
Representing the United States
Olympic Games
Gold medal – first place	1996 Atlanta	4 × 100 m relay
Bronze medal – third place	2000 Sydney	4 × 100 m relay
World Championships
Gold medal – first place	1995 Gothenburg	4 × 100 m relay
Gold medal – first place	1997 Athens	4 × 100 m relay
Silver medal – second place	2003 Paris	4 × 100 m relay
Disqualified	2001 Edmonton	4 × 100 m relay
Pan American Games
Gold medal – first place	1995 Mar del Plata	100 m

Chryste Dionne Gaines (born September 14, 1970) is an American Olympic athlete who competed mainly in the sprints.

== Education ==
Gaines was born in Lawton, Oklahoma, and is a 1988 graduate of South Oak Cliff High School in Dallas, Texas.

During her senior year, Gaines was named the Gatorade National High School Girls Track & Field Athlete of the Year.

Gaines received a bachelor's degree from Stanford University in 1992 and an MBA from Coles College of Business, Kennesaw State University in 2007.

== Track and Field ==
While at Stanford, Gaines was the 1992 NCAA indoor champion in the 55 meter sprint and the 1992 NCAA outdoor champion at 100 meters. She was the first person to win the conference 100 meter championship three times.

Gaines competed for the United States in Atlanta's 1996 Summer Olympics. In the 4 × 100 metres, she won the gold medal with teammates Gail Devers, Inger Miller and Gwen Torrence.

She returned to Sydney for the 2000 Summer Olympics as the sole survivor of the 4 × 100 meters team. Teamed with Marion Jones Torri Edwards and Nanceen Perry, the Americans earned a bronze medal.

Gaines's best time in the 100 meters was 10.86 seconds (run in 2003).

Gaines successfully competed until 2008.

== Doping allegations ==
In 2003, Gaines was issued a Public Warning and had her results disqualified for the detection of Modafinil. The same year she was investigated as part of the BALCO scandal and in 2004 she received a two-year doping ban.

Because of a teammate's steroid use, the IOC tried to force the 4 × 100 relay team to return their bronze medal from the 2000 Olympics. Gaines and her five teammates would successfully appeal.

== Honors and awards ==
Gaines was the 1987–88 Gatorade National Track & Field Athlete of the Year, an award that goes to one high school girl each year from around the country.

In 2009, she was named one of 10 "Women Out Front", a leadership award given by Georgia Tech, where she was an academic advisor.

In 2018, she was named to the 10-person inaugural class of the Dallas Independent School District's Athletic Hall of Fame.

== Coaching ==
Gaines has coached at the high school and college level. As of 2018, Gaines was the track and field and cross country coach at Heritage High School in Frisco, Texas.

== See also ==
- List of doping cases in athletics
