= Athletics at the 1995 Pan American Games =

- Dates: 17–25 March
- Host city: Mar del Plata, Argentina
- Venue: Estadio Atletico "Justo Roman"
- Level: Senior
- Events: 44
- Participation: 434 athletes from 34 nations

The Athletics Competition at the 1995 Pan American Games was held in Mar del Plata, Argentina between 17 and 25 March.

== Medal summary ==
=== Men's events ===
Event	Gold		Silver		Bronze	
100 metres (wind: +3.4 m/s)	Glenroy Gilbert; Canada	10.21w	Joel Isasi; Cuba	10.23w	André da Silva; Brazil	10.23w
200 metres (wind: +1.1 m/s)	Iván García; Cuba	20.29	Andrew Tynes; Bahamas	20.33	Sebastián Keitel; Chile	20.55
400 metres	Norberto Téllez; Cuba	45.38	Omar Mena; Cuba	45.64	Eswort Coombs; Saint Vincent and the Grenadines	45.68
800 metres	José Luíz Barbosa; Brazil	1:46.02	Alain Miranda; Cuba	1:46.88	Brad Sumner; United States	1:47.58
1500 metres	Joaquim Cruz; Brazil	3:40.26	Terrance Herrington; United States	3:40.97	Jason Pyrah; United States	3:42.34
5000 metres	Armando Quintanilla; Mexico	13:30.35	Wander do Prado Moura; Brazil	13:45.53	Silvio Guerra; Ecuador	13:52.29
10,000 metres	Armando Quintanilla; Mexico	28:57.41	Valdenor dos Santos; Brazil	29:04.79	Ronaldo da Costa; Brazil	29:07.68
Marathon	Benjamín Paredes; Mexico	2:14:44	Mark Coogan; United States	2:15:21	Luiz Carlos da Silva; Brazil	2:15:46
110 metres hurdles (wind: +0.8 m/s)	Roger Kingdom; United States	13.39	Emilio Valle; Cuba	13.4	Courtney Hawkins; United States	13.54
400 metres hurdles	Eronilde de Araújo; Brazil	49.29	Everson Teixeira; Brazil	50.24	Llimy Rivas; Colombia	50.37
3000 metres steeplechase	Wander do Prado Moura; Brazil	8:14.41	Brian Diemer; United States	8:30.58	Dan Reese; United States	8:31.58
4 × 100 metres relay	Cuba; Joel Isasi; Joel Lamela; Iván García; Jorge Aguilera	38.67	United States; Dino Napier; Ron Clark; Robert Reading; Wendell Gaskin	39.12	Mexico; Jaime Barragán; Alejandro Cárdenas; Carlos Villaseñor; Salvador Miranda	39.77
4 × 400 metres relay	Cuba; Iván García; Jorge Crusellas; Omar Meña; Norberto Téllez	3:01.53	Jamaica; Orville Taylor; Michael McDonald; Roxbert Martin; Dennis Blake	3:02.11	Trinidad and Tobago; Robert Guy; Neil de Silva; Hayden Stephen; Ian Morris	3:02.24
20 kilometres walk	Jefferson Pérez; Ecuador	1:22:53	Daniel García; Mexico	1:22:57	Julio René Martínez; Guatemala	1:23:50
50 kilometres walk	Carlos Mercenario; Mexico	3:47:55	Miguel Rodríguez; Mexico	3:48:22	Julio César Urías; Guatemala	3:49:37 (NR)
High jump	Javier Sotomayor; Cuba	2.40	Steve Smith; United States	2.29	Gilmar Mayo; Colombia	2.26
Pole vault	Pat Manson; United States	5.75	Bill Deering; United States	5.60	Alberto Manzano; Cuba	5.40
Long jump	Iván Pedroso; Cuba	8.50	Jaime Jefferson; Cuba	8.23	Elmer Williams; Puerto Rico	8.00w
Triple jump	Yoelbi Quesada; Cuba	17.67	Jérôme Romain; Dominica	17.24	Yoel García; Cuba	17.21w
Shot put	C.J. Hunter; United States	20.52	Jorge Montenegro; Cuba	18.94	Gert Weil; Chile	18.71
Discus throw	Roberto Moya; Cuba	63.58	Alexis Elizalde; Cuba	62.00	Randy Heisler; United States	60.12
Hammer throw	Lance Deal; United States	75.64	Alberto Sánchez; Cuba	73.94	Andrés Charadia; Argentina	71.78
Javelin throw	Emeterio González; Cuba	79.28	Edgar Baumann; Paraguay	78.70	Todd Riech; United States	77.82
Decathlon	Kip Janvrin; United States	8049	Eugenio Balanqué; Cuba	7948	Alejandro Cárdenas; Mexico	7387

=== Women's events ===
Event	Gold		Silver		Bronze	
100 metres (wind: +4.9 m/s)	Chryste Gaines; United States	11.05w	Liliana Allen; Cuba	11.16w	Heather Samuel; Antigua and Barbuda	11.33w
200 metres (wind: +0.7 m/s)	Liliana Allen; Cuba	22.73	Dahlia Duhaney; Jamaica	23.03	Omegia Keeys; United States	23.24
400 metres	Julia Duporty; Cuba	50.77	Nancy McLeón; Cuba	51.81	Flirtisha Harris; United States	52.51
800 metres	Meredith Rainey; United States	1:59.44	Luciana Mendes; Brazil	2:01.71	Letitia Vriesde; Suriname	2:02.25
1500 metres	Sarah Thorsett; United States	4:21.84	Sarah Howell; Canada	4:22.10	Marta Orellana; Argentina	4:22.44
5000 metres	Adriana Fernández; Mexico	15:46.32	María del Carmen Díaz; Mexico	15:46.43	Carol Montgomery; Canada	15:46.80
10,000 metres	Carmem de Oliveira; Brazil	33:10.19	Carol Montgomery; Canada	33:13.58	María del Carmen Díaz; Mexico	33:14.94
Marathon	Maria Trujillo; United States	2:43:56	Jennifer Martin; United States	2:44:10	Emma Cabrera; Mexico	2:46:36
100 metres hurdles (wind: +2.1 m/s)	Aliuska López; Cuba	12.68w	Donalda Duprey; Canada	13.16w	Odalys Adams; Cuba	13.17w
400 metres hurdles	Kim Batten; United States	54.74	Tonja Buford; United States	55.05	Lency Montelier; Cuba	55.74
4 × 100 metres relay	United States; Shantel Twiggs; Richelle Webb; Flirtisha Harris; Chryste Gaines	43.55	Cuba; Miriam Ferrer; Aliuska López; Dainelky Pérez; Liliana Allen	44.08	Colombia; Elia Mera; Felipa Palacios; Patricia Rodríguez; Mirtha Brock	44.10
4 × 400 metres relay	Cuba; Surella Morales; Nancy McLeón; Idalmis Bonne; Julia Duporty	3:27.45	United States; Tonya Williams; Terri Dendy; Flirtisha Harris; Crystal Irving	3:31.22	Colombia; Patricia Rodríguez; Elia Mera; Mirtha Brock; Felipa Palacios	3:38.54
10,000 metres walk	Graciela Mendoza; Mexico	46:31.9	Michelle Rohl; United States	46:36.5	Francisca Martínez; Mexico	47:44.8
High jump	Ioamnet Quintero; Cuba	1.94	Silvia Costa; Cuba	1.91	Angela Bradburn; United States	1.91
Long jump	Niurka Montalvo; Cuba	6.89	Andrea Ávila; Argentina	6.52	Jackie Edwards; Bahamas	6.50
Triple jump	Laiza Carrillo; Cuba	14.09	Niurka Montalvo; Cuba	13.90w	Andrea Ávila; Argentina	13.84w
Hammer Throw	Alexandria Given; United States	58.92	Eugenia Villmizar; Colombia	56.14	Sonja Fitts; United States	56.06
Shot put	Connie Price-Smith; United States	19.17	Ramona Pagel; United States	18.50	Yumileidi Cumbá; Cuba	18.47
Javelin Throw	Xiomara Rivero; Cuba	63.92	Laverne Eve; Bahamas	61.28	Valerie Tulloch; Canada	60.58
Discus throw	Maritza Martén; Cuba	61.22	Bárbara Hechevarría; Cuba	60.20	Kris Kuehl; United States	56.92

== Medal table ==
Place	Nation	Gold medal	Silver medal	Bronze medal	Total
1	Cuba	18	15	5	38
2	United States	13	11	11	35
3	Mexico	6	3	5	14
4	Brazil	5	4	3	12
5	Canada	1	3	2	6
6	Ecuador	1	0	1	2
7	Bahamas	0	2	1	3
8	Jamaica	0	2	0	2
9	Argentina	0	1	3	4
10	Paraguay	0	1	0	1
10	Dominica	0	1	0	1
12	Colombia	0	1	4	5
13	Guatemala	0	0	2	2
13	Chile	0	0	2	2
15	Antigua and Barbuda	0	0	1	1
15	Trinidad and Tobago	0	0	1	1
15	Puerto Rico	0	0	1	1
15	Suriname	0	0	1	1
15	Saint Vincent and the Grenadines	0	0	1	1
Total		44	44	44	132

== Participating nations ==
- Antigua and Barbuda (2)
- Argentina (66)
- Bahamas (7)
- Barbados (3)
- Belize (2)
- Bermuda (2)
- Bolivia (5)
- Brazil (29)
- Canada (27)
- Chile (11)
- Colombia (13)
- Costa Rica (1)
- Cuba (56)
- Dominica (8)
- Ecuador (8)
- Grenada (5)
- Guatemala (6)
- Guyana (1)
- Haiti (1)
- Jamaica (16)
- Mexico (30)
- Nicaragua (2)
- Paraguay (9)
- Peru (4)
- Puerto Rico (9)
- Saint Kitts and Nevis (8)
- Saint Vincent and the Grenadines (1)
- El Salvador (1)
- Suriname (2)
- Trinidad and Tobago (9)
- United States (81)
- Virgin Islands (3)
- Uruguay (2)
- Venezuela (4)
