= Athletics at the 1993 Central American and Caribbean Games – Results =

These are the full results of the athletics competition at the 1993 Central American and Caribbean Games which took place between 23 and 28 November 1993, at the Estadio Francisco Montaner in Ponce, Puerto Rico.

== Men's results ==
=== 100 metres ===
Heats – 23 November
Wind:
Heat 1: -0.04 m/s, Heat 2: -1.22 m/s, Heat 3: -1.34 m/s

Rank	Heat	Name	Nationality	Time	Notes
1	1	Joel Isasi	Cuba	10.53	Q
2	2	Andrés Simón	Cuba	10.59	Q
3	3	Patrick Delice	Trinidad and Tobago	10.62	Q
4	1	Agner Muñoz	Puerto Rico	10.73	Q
4	3	Wenceslao Ferrín	Colombia	10.73	Q
6	1	Windell Dobson	Jamaica	10.77	q
7	1	John Mena	Colombia	10.81	q
8	2	Boyd Kennedy	Trinidad and Tobago	10.87	Q
9	3	Iram Lewis	Bahamas	10.97	
10	2	Gabriel Simeon	Grenada	11.03	
11	1	Elston Shaw	Belize	11.07	
11	3	Radames Sánchez	Dominican Republic	11.07	
13	1	Jacques Nau Jean	Haiti	11.10	
14	2	Alfredo Richards	Panama	11.21	
15	2	Patrick Williams	Jamaica	11.28	
16	1	Mitchell Peters	United States Virgin Islands	11.29	
17	3	Johnny Sille	Netherlands Antilles	11.30	
18	3	Stacy Beggs	Grenada	11.35	
19	2	Siegfried Regales	Netherlands Antilles	11.54	
	2	Bernard Young	Bahamas	DNS	
	3	Neville Hodge	United States Virgin Islands	DNS	

Final – 24 November

Wind: -1.68 m/s

Rank	Lane	Name	Nationality	Time	Notes
1st place, gold medalist(s)	6	Joel Isasi	Cuba	10.38	
2nd place, silver medalist(s)	4	Andrés Simón	Cuba	10.49	
3rd place, bronze medalist(s)	5	Patrick Delice	Trinidad and Tobago	10.62	
4	2	Wenceslao Ferrín	Colombia	10.67	
5	7	Windell Dobson	Jamaica	10.71	
6	8	Boyd Kennedy	Trinidad and Tobago	10.83	
7	3	Agner Muñoz	Puerto Rico	10.84	
8	1	John Mena	Colombia	10.85	

=== 200 metres ===
Heats – 25 November
Wind:
Heat 1: +1.43 m/s, Heat 2: +1.39 m/s, Heat 3: +1.53 m/s

Rank	Heat	Name	Nationality	Time	Notes
1	1	Andrew Tynes	Bahamas	20.89	Q
2	3	Iván García	Cuba	20.91	Q
3	1	Jorge Aguilera	Cuba	21.05	Q
4	2	Edgardo Guilbe	Puerto Rico	21.08	Q
5	2	Patrick Delice	Trinidad and Tobago	21.27	Q
6	1	Eswort Coombs	Saint Vincent and the Grenadines	21.39	q
7	3	Luis Alfonso Vega	Colombia	21.62	Q
8	2	Patrick Brown	Jamaica	21.75	q
9	2	Kenmore Hughes	Antigua and Barbuda	21.81	
10	1	Keith Smith	United States Virgin Islands	21.83	
11	3	Gabriel Simeon	Grenada	21.85	
12	3	Wayne Robinson	Jamaica	21.88	
13	2	Radames Sánchez	Dominican Republic	22.10	
14	3	Jacques Nau Jean	Haiti	22.20	
15	1	Dazel Jules	Trinidad and Tobago	22.32	
16	3	Derry Pemberton	United States Virgin Islands	22.40	
17	2	Howard Koiman	Netherlands Antilles	22.41	
18	1	Alfredo Richards	Panama	22.43	
19	1	Johnny Sille	Netherlands Antilles	23.33	

Final – 27 November

Wind: +1.30 m/s

Rank	Lane	Name	Nationality	Time	Notes
1st place, gold medalist(s)	6	Andrew Tynes	Bahamas	20.64	
2nd place, silver medalist(s)	4	Iván García	Cuba	20.71	
3rd place, bronze medalist(s)	5	Jorge Aguilera	Cuba	20.91	
4	3	Edgardo Guilbe	Puerto Rico	20.94	
5	1	Patrick Delice	Trinidad and Tobago	21.24	
6	7	Luis Alfonso Vega	Colombia	21.53	
7	8	Eswort Coombs	Saint Vincent and the Grenadines	21.64	
8	2	Patrick Brown	Jamaica	21.76	

=== 400 metres ===
Heats – 24 November

Rank	Heat	Name	Nationality	Time	Notes
1	1	Omar Mena	Cuba	46.18	Q
2	2	Norberto Téllez	Cuba	46.44	Q
3	1	Ian Morris	Trinidad and Tobago	46.75	Q
4	2	Neil de Silva	Trinidad and Tobago	46.77	Q
5	2	Evon Clarke	Jamaica	46.83	Q
6	1	Danny McFarlane	Jamaica	46.87	Q
7	2	Wilson Cañizales	Colombia	46.88	q
8	1	Eswort Coombs	Saint Vincent and the Grenadines	46.99	q
9	2	Kenmore Hughes	Antigua and Barbuda	47.73	
10	1	Roberto Hilardo	Puerto Rico	48.04	
11	1	Felix Delon	Grenada	48.86	
12	2	John Palacio	Belize	49.71	
13	1	Raymond Galloway	United States Virgin Islands	50.40	

Final – 25 November

Rank	Lane	Name	Nationality	Time	Notes
1st place, gold medalist(s)	3	Norberto Téllez	Cuba	45.80	
2nd place, silver medalist(s)	6	Neil de Silva	Trinidad and Tobago	46.07	
3rd place, bronze medalist(s)	5	Omar Mena	Cuba	46.32	
4	4	Ian Morris	Trinidad and Tobago	46.33	
5	1	Evon Clarke	Jamaica	46.73	
6	8	Danny McFarlane	Jamaica	46.96	
7	7	Wilson Cañizales	Colombia	47.19	
8	2	Eswort Coombs	Saint Vincent and the Grenadines	47.63	

=== 800 metres ===
Heats – 27 November

Rank	Heat	Name	Nationality	Time	Notes
1	2	Arturo Espejel	Mexico	1:49.94	Q
2	1	Tommy Asinga	Suriname	1:50.13	Q
3	2	Alain Miranda	Cuba	1:50.25	Q
4	1	Javier Soto	Puerto Rico	1:50.29	Q
5	2	Dale Jones	Antigua and Barbuda	1:50.37	Q
6	1	Héctor Herrera	Cuba	1:50.50	Q
6	2	Carlos Mairena	Nicaragua	1:50.50	q
8	1	Desmond Hector	Guyana	1:51.00	q
9	1	Luis Toledo	Mexico	1:51.57	
10	2	Miguel Rodríguez	Puerto Rico	1:51.83	
11	2	Juan José Tapia	Panama	1:51.88	
12	1	John Palacio	Belize	1:58.63	

Final – 28 November

Rank	Name	Nationality	Time	Notes
1st place, gold medalist(s)	Javier Soto	Puerto Rico	1:49.40	
2nd place, silver medalist(s)	Héctor Herrera	Cuba	1:49.99	
3rd place, bronze medalist(s)	Dale Jones	Antigua and Barbuda	1:50.05	
4	Tommy Asinga	Suriname	1:50.60	
5	Desmond Hector	Guyana	1:51.31	
6	Arturo Espejel	Mexico	1:51.36	
7	Carlos Mairena	Nicaragua	1:53.53	
	Alain Miranda	Cuba	DQ	

=== 1500 metres ===
24 November

Rank	Name	Nationality	Time	Notes
1st place, gold medalist(s)	José López	Venezuela	3:43.89	
2nd place, silver medalist(s)	Desmond Hector	Guyana	3:46.08	
3rd place, bronze medalist(s)	Arturo Espejel	Mexico	3:46.74	
4	Ricardo Herrera	Mexico	3:47.40	
5	Luis Martínez	Guatemala	3:47.68	
6	Juan Antonio Conde	Cuba	3:49.53	
7	Mark Olivo	Venezuela	3:56.27	
8	Dale Jones	Antigua and Barbuda	3:59.13	
9	Carlos Mairena	Nicaragua	3:59.41	
10	Dagoberto Pérez	El Salvador	3:59.53	
	Juan José Tapia	Panama	DQ	

=== 5000 metres ===
25 November

Rank	Name	Nationality	Time	Notes
1st place, gold medalist(s)	Isaac García	Mexico	13:57.84	
2nd place, silver medalist(s)	Gabino Apolonio	Mexico	14:06.43	
3rd place, bronze medalist(s)	Orlando Ceballos	Puerto Rico	14:31.08	
4	Kavin Smith	Bermuda	14:55.98	
5	José Guzmán	El Salvador	15:13.61	
6	Kraige Schmitt	United States Virgin Islands	15:50.13	
	Iván Gómez	Guatemala	DQ	
	Linton McKenzie	Jamaica	DNS	

=== 10,000 metres ===
25 November

Rank	Name	Nationality	Time	Notes
1st place, gold medalist(s)	Dionicio Cerón	Mexico	28:58.11	
2nd place, silver medalist(s)	Isaac García	Mexico	29:33.74	
3rd place, bronze medalist(s)	Orlando Ceballos	Puerto Rico	30:11.60	
4	Kavin Smith	Bermuda	30:57.45	
5	Linton McKenzie	Jamaica	31:14.15	
6	Kimball Reynierse	Aruba	31:43.67	
7	José Guzmán	El Salvador	31:46.68	
8	Marlon Williams	United States Virgin Islands	34:25.19	
9	Harold Sanon	Haiti	35:31.36	
10	Litz Regis	Haiti	36:24.23	
	Victor Ledger	Saint Lucia	DNF	
	Benedict Ballantyne	Saint Vincent and the Grenadines	DNS	

=== Marathon ===
28 November

Rank	Name	Nationality	Time	Notes
1st place, gold medalist(s)	Benjamín Paredes	Mexico	2:14:23	
2nd place, silver medalist(s)	Julio Hernández	Colombia	2:17:21	
3rd place, bronze medalist(s)	Samuel López	Mexico	2:17:38	
4	Ignacio Cuba	Cuba	2:18:10	
5	Alexis Cuba	Cuba	2:22:57	
6	Héctor Cardona	Puerto Rico	2:27:03	
7	Cordoy Simon	Antigua and Barbuda	2:32:34	
8	Owen Sobers	Trinidad and Tobago	2:34:52	
9	Calvin Dallas	United States Virgin Islands	2:37:31	
10	Lennox Jacobs	Guyana	3:10:30	
	Nicolas Rivière	Haiti	DNF	
	Lionel Ortiz	Puerto Rico	DNF	

=== 110 metres hurdles ===
24 November
Wind: -1.69 m/s

Rank	Lane	Name	Nationality	Time	Notes
1st place, gold medalist(s)	3	Emilio Valle	Cuba	13.87	
2nd place, silver medalist(s)	8	Wagner Marseille	Haiti	14.10	
3rd place, bronze medalist(s)	7	Alexis Sánchez	Cuba	14.14	
4	2	Matthew Love	Jamaica	14.94	
5	6	César Krings	Guatemala	15.69	
6	5	José Rivera	Guatemala	16.94	
	4	Miguel Soto	Puerto Rico	DNF	

=== 400 metres hurdles ===
Heats – 27 November

Rank	Heat	Name	Nationality	Time	Notes
1	2	Domingo Cordero	Puerto Rico	50.36	Q
2	2	Pedro Piñera	Cuba	50.61	Q
3	1	José Pérez	Cuba	51.14	Q
3	2	Juan Gutiérrez	Mexico	51.14	Q
5	1	Llimy Rivas	Colombia	51.60	Q
6	2	Winston Sinclair	Jamaica	51.59	q
7	1	César Krings	Guatemala	52.82	Q
8	2	Alex Foster	Costa Rica	52.84	q
9	1	Pablo Agosto	Puerto Rico	53.93	
	1	Mark Thompson	Jamaica	DNS	

Final – 28 November

Rank	Lane	Name	Nationality	Time	Notes
1st place, gold medalist(s)	3	Domingo Cordero	Puerto Rico	49.60	GR
2nd place, silver medalist(s)	6	Pedro Piñera	Cuba	50.12	
3rd place, bronze medalist(s)	5	Juan Gutiérrez	Mexico	50.47	
4	4	José Pérez	Cuba	50.51	
5	1	Winston Sinclair	Jamaica	51.22	
6	8	Llimy Rivas	Colombia	51.86	
7	7	César Krings	Guatemala	52.83	
8	2	Alex Foster	Costa Rica	53.80	

=== 3000 metres steeplechase ===
28 November

Rank	Name	Nationality	Time	Notes
1st place, gold medalist(s)	Rubén García	Mexico	8:38.43	GR
2nd place, silver medalist(s)	Héctor Arias	Mexico	8:40.19	
3rd place, bronze medalist(s)	Juan Ramón Conde	Cuba	8:45.62	
4	Juan Antonio Conde	Cuba	8:58.03	
5	Luis Martínez	Guatemala	9:08.76	
6	Alfredo Castro	Puerto Rico	9:20.06	
7	Dagoberto Pérez	El Salvador	9:44.35	

=== 4 × 100 metres relay ===
25 November

Rank	Lane	Team	Name	Time	Notes
1st place, gold medalist(s)	5	Cuba	Andrés Simón, Iván García, Joel Isasi, Jorge Aguilera	39.24	
2nd place, silver medalist(s)	3	Puerto Rico	Carlos Santos, Domingo Cordero, Edgardo Guilbe, Agner Muñoz	40.01	
3rd place, bronze medalist(s)	2	Colombia	Wenceslao Ferrín, Wilson Cañizales, Luis Alfonso Vega, John Mena	40.09	
4	6	Jamaica	Patrick Williams, Windell Dobson, Patrick Brown, Carl McPherson	40.36	
5	4	Trinidad and Tobago	Boyd Kennedy, Patrick Delice, Neil de Silva, Dazel Jules	40.73	
6	7	United States Virgin Islands	Derry Pemberton, Neville Hodge, Mitchell Peters, Keith Smith	41.48	
	8	Netherlands Antilles		DNS	

=== 4 × 400 metres relay ===
28 November

Rank	Lane	Team	Name	Time	Notes
1st place, gold medalist(s)	2	Cuba	Omar Mena, Héctor Herrera, Lázaro Martínez, Norberto Téllez	3:05.62	
2nd place, silver medalist(s)	5	Trinidad and Tobago	Patrick Delice, Neil de Silva, Dazel Jules, Ian Morris	3:06.96	
3rd place, bronze medalist(s)	6	Jamaica	Michael Anderson, Carl McPherson, Danny McFarlane, Evon Clarke	3:07.23	
4	3	Puerto Rico	Elmer Williams, Edgardo Guilbe, Domingo Cordero, Roberto Hilardo	3:08.05	
5	4	Colombia	Wenceslao Ferrín, Llimy Rivas, Luis Alfonso Vega, Wilson Cañizales	3:08.96	

=== 20 kilometres walk ===
23 November

Rank	Name	Nationality	Time	Notes
1st place, gold medalist(s)	Daniel García	Mexico	1:26:22	
2nd place, silver medalist(s)	Héctor Moreno	Colombia	1:26:32	
3rd place, bronze medalist(s)	Julio René Martínez	Guatemala	1:29:43	
4	Carlos Ramones	Venezuela	1:30:52	
5	Clodomiro Moreno	Colombia	1:33:20	
6	Reynaldo Rosario	Venezuela	1:33:58	
7	José Torres	Puerto Rico	1:35:00	
	Ignacio Zamudio	Mexico	DNF	

=== 50 kilometres walk ===
27 November

Rank	Name	Nationality	Time	Notes
1st place, gold medalist(s)	Edel Oliva	Cuba	3:55:20	
2nd place, silver medalist(s)	Germán Sánchez	Mexico	3:56:17	
3rd place, bronze medalist(s)	Julio César Urías	Guatemala	4:03:23	
4	Miguel Ángel Rodríguez	Mexico	4:09:40	
5	Nicolas Soto	Puerto Rico	4:17:45	
	Orlando Díaz	Colombia	DNF	
	Querubín Moreno	Colombia	DNF	
	José Ramírez	Puerto Rico	DNF	

=== High jump ===
24 November

Rank	Name	Nationality	1.90	1.95	2.00	2.05	2.08	2.11	2.14	2.17	2.20	2.22	2.28	2.31	2.35	2.40	Result	Notes
1st place, gold medalist(s)	Javier Sotomayor	Cuba	–	–	–	–	–	–	–	–	o	–	o	xxo	o	x	2.35	GR
2nd place, silver medalist(s)	Marino Drake	Cuba	–	–	–	–	–	–	xo	xo	xxo	xxx					2.20	
3rd place, bronze medalist(s)	Antonio Burgos	Puerto Rico	–	–	–	o	o	o	o	xxx							2.14	
4	Gilmar Mayo	Colombia	–	–	–	o	–	xo	xo	xxx							2.14	
5	Carlos Arzuaga	Puerto Rico	–	–	–	–	o	o	xxx								2.11	
6	Brian Morris	Saint Kitts and Nevis	xo	xo	xxx												1.95	

=== Pole vault ===
27 November

Rank	Name	Nationality	5.00	5.20	5.30	5.40	5.45	Result	Notes
1st place, gold medalist(s)	Edgar Díaz	Puerto Rico	–	o	o	xx–	x	5.30	
2nd place, silver medalist(s)	Alberto Manzano	Cuba	o	o	xo	xxx		5.30	
	Pablo Benavides	Mexico	–	xxx				NM	
	Miguel Berrios	Cuba	xx					NM	

=== Long jump ===
25 November

Rank	Name	Nationality	#1	#2	#3	#4	#5	#6	Result	Notes
1st place, gold medalist(s)	Wendell Williams	Trinidad and Tobago	7.90	7.95	7.64	7.52	7.93	7.09	7.95	
2nd place, silver medalist(s)	Michael Francis	Puerto Rico	7.43	7.89	7.67	7.56	7.92	7.55	7.92	
3rd place, bronze medalist(s)	Jaime Jefferson	Cuba	7.44	7.85	7.75	7.49	7.58	7.46	7.85	
4	Elmer Williams	Puerto Rico	7.45	7.74	7.79w	7.55	7.67	7.55	7.79w	
5	Juan Garzón	Cuba	7.68	7.78	7.67	7.75	x	7.69	7.78	
6	Eugene Licorish	Grenada	x	x	7.02	x	x	7.33	7.33	
7	Chris Wright	Bahamas	6.99w	6.85	6.10	x	x	6.43	6.99w	
8	Lloyd Phipps	Saint Kitts and Nevis	6.31	6.78	6.34	6.78	6.60	6.78	6.78	
9	Elston Shaw	Belize	6.09	6.76	6.58				6.76	
	Ronald Chambers	Jamaica							DNS	

=== Triple jump ===
24 November

Rank	Name	Nationality	#1	#2	#3	#4	#5	#6	Result	Notes
1st place, gold medalist(s)	Yoelbi Quesada	Cuba	16.75	16.90	17.06	16.89	16.77	16.21	17.06	GR
2nd place, silver medalist(s)	Daniel Osorio	Cuba	16.22	16.20	x	16.52	x	x	16.52	
3rd place, bronze medalist(s)	Sergio Saavedra	Venezuela	x	16.10	x	16.30	16.20	16.22	16.30	
4	José Escalera	Puerto Rico	15.35w	15.88	16.16	15.87	16.00	15.94	16.16	
5	Ed Manderson	Cayman Islands	x	14.68	14.99	15.20	15.30	x	15.30	
6	Jerome Douglas	Jamaica	x	14.83w	14.58w	14.72	15.05	14.86	15.05	
7	Lloyd Phipps	Saint Kitts and Nevis	14.42	14.43	14.23	14.33	14.93	14.42	14.93	
8	Jay Welcome	Cayman Islands	14.63	14.64	14.43	14.45	13.92	14.54w	14.64	

=== Shot put ===
28 November

Rank	Name	Nationality	#1	#2	#3	#4	#5	#6	Result	Notes
1st place, gold medalist(s)	Jorge Montenegro	Cuba	18.30	18.88	x	17.31	17.53	x	18.88	
2nd place, silver medalist(s)	Carlos Fandiño	Cuba	18.09	18.09	18.45	x	18.68	x	18.68	
3rd place, bronze medalist(s)	Yojer Medina	Venezuela	17.34	17.61	17.64	17.59	17.96	17.94	17.96	
4	Francisco Ball	Puerto Rico	16.94	17.06	x	17.08	x	17.70	17.70	
5	Samuel Crespo	Puerto Rico	16.10	x	16.08	x	16.02	16.08	16.10	
6	Clifford Worme	Grenada	14.04	14.17	13.95	14.48	14.37	14.73	14.73	
	Curland Peters	Grenada	x	x	x	x	x	x	NM	

=== Discus throw ===
23 November

Rank	Name	Nationality	#1	#2	#3	#4	#5	#6	Result	Notes
1st place, gold medalist(s)	Alexis Elizalde	Cuba	x	58.64	58.14	55.98	59.80	61.24	61.24	
2nd place, silver medalist(s)	Luis Delís	Cuba	59.30	57.90	58.28	x	59.92	59.32	59.32	
3rd place, bronze medalist(s)	Yojer Medina	Venezuela	50.88	53.10	54.94	x	50.06	x	54.94	
4	Alfredo Romero	Puerto Rico	47.32	49.62	x	52.74	51.80	x	52.74	
5	Eulogio Cruz	Dominican Republic	48.00	49.02	x	46.24	49.74	48.68	49.74	
6	Delfin Crespo	Puerto Rico	48.28	x	x	47.52	47.72	47.54	48.28	
7	Tyrone Minguel	Netherlands Antilles	40.16	38.48	x	39.20	39.36	x	40.16	
8	John Paul Clarke	Jamaica	x	36.64	x	x	37.72	38.78	38.78	
	Juan Neverson	Saint Vincent and the Grenadines							DNS	
	Curtis Bynde	Dominica							DNS	

=== Hammer throw ===
25 November

Rank	Name	Nationality	#1	#2	#3	#4	#5	#6	Result	Notes
1st place, gold medalist(s)	Alberto Sánchez	Cuba	67.78	71.08	68.26	72.20	x	71.80	72.20	GR
2nd place, silver medalist(s)	Eladio Hernández	Cuba	64.74	x	59.80	69.58	x	x	69.58	
3rd place, bronze medalist(s)	Guillermo Guzmán	Mexico	61.02	65.38	63.62	64.04	65.52	x	65.52	
4	Santos Vega	Puerto Rico	x	x	53.02	x	54.78	x	54.78	
5	John Paul Clarke	Jamaica	x	44.28	48.16	x	42.16	50.95	50.95	

=== Javelin throw ===
27 November

Rank	Name	Nationality	#1	#2	#3	#4	#5	#6	Result	Notes
1st place, gold medalist(s)	Luis Lucumí	Colombia	70.42	73.44	71.96	72.42	74.58	74.38	74.58	
2nd place, silver medalist(s)	Ovidio Trimiño	Cuba	66.42	73.08	69.64	64.42	71.10	x	73.08	
3rd place, bronze medalist(s)	Emeterio González	Cuba	66.60	67.30	69.70	68.26	71.12	71.24	71.24	
4	Juan de la Garza	Mexico	x	68.34	x	67.80	68.98	66.64	68.98	
5	Rigoberto Calderón	Nicaragua	60.24	63.72	60.92	60.52	60.84	59.06	63.72	
6	Nelson Ocón	Nicaragua	55.46	56.14	53.20	56.82	58.96	62.86	62.86	
7	Gelvin Smith	Grenada	61.96	56.98	57.64	60.40	59.54	58.52	61.96	
8	Curland Peters	Grenada	57.38	57.10	59.18	x	54.16	x	59.18	
9	Ryan Bovell	Barbados	51.62	x	52.54				52.54	
	Collin Walters	Saint Kitts and Nevis	x	x	x				NM	

=== Decathlon ===
23–24 November

The highest mark recorded in each event is highlighted in yellow

Rank	Athlete	Nationality	100m	LJ	SP	HJ	400m	110m H	DT	PV	JT	1500m	Points	Notes
1st place, gold medalist(s)	Eugenio Balanqué	Cuba	11.04	7.16	13.77	2.00	48.88	14.68	43.28	4.64	57.90	4:44.46	7889	GR
2nd place, silver medalist(s)	Raúl Duany	Cuba	11.44	7.55	12.55	2.03	49.20	15.28	36.52	4.14	66.08	4:24.11	7715	
3rd place, bronze medalist(s)	José Román	Puerto Rico	11.67	7.13	14.18	1.88	52.21	15.43	45.28	4.54	57.64	5:10.00	7262	
4	Jorge Camacho	Mexico	11.64	6.73	11.85	1.84	50.85	16.34	37.54	4.24	42.26	4:34.00	6705	
5	Alberto Gutiérrez	Puerto Rico	11.84	6.68	12.34	1.91	52.36	15.14	37.94	4.04	47.96	5:16.53	6591	
6	Reynaldo Guerrero	Dominican Republic	11.92	5.90	12.07	1.76	52.99	15.94	38.36	4.14	51.82	4:59.21	6325	
7	Maxwell Seales	Saint Lucia	11.53	7.20	11.46	1.94	50.66	17.50	35.20	NM	55.78	4:59.21	6102	
	Rupert Solomon	British Virgin Islands	11.69	6.40	11.50	1.85	51.74	16.91	23.30	DNS	–	–	DNF	

== Women's results ==
=== 100 metres ===
Heats – 23 November
Wind:
Heat 1: -2.81 m/s, Heat 2: -1.00 m/s

Rank	Heat	Name	Nationality	Time	Notes
1	1	Liliana Allen	Cuba	11.88	Q
2	2	Miriam Ferrer	Cuba	11.91	Q
3	2	Eldece Clarke	Bahamas	11.95	Q
4	2	Dagmar Rosado	Puerto Rico	11.99	Q
5	1	Chandra Sturrup	Bahamas	12.01	Q
6	2	Patricia Rodríguez	Colombia	12.08	q
7	1	Cherry Phillips	Jamaica	12.25	Q
7	2	Kerry-Ann Richards	Jamaica	12.25	q
9	1	Alicia Tyson	Trinidad and Tobago	12.31	
10	1	Elia Mera	Colombia	12.54	
11	2	Bernice Morton	Saint Kitts and Nevis	12.56	
12	2	Ameerah Bello	United States Virgin Islands	12.58	
13	2	Charmine Wilson	Trinidad and Tobago	12.66	
14	1	Ruth Morris	United States Virgin Islands	12.75	

Final – 24 November

Wind: -1.73 m/s

Rank	Lane	Name	Nationality	Time	Notes
1st place, gold medalist(s)	3	Liliana Allen	Cuba	11.52	
2nd place, silver medalist(s)	5	Miriam Ferrer	Cuba	11.81	
3rd place, bronze medalist(s)	1	Chandra Sturrup	Bahamas	11.89	
4	4	Eldece Clarke	Bahamas	12.00	
5	7	Cherry Phillips	Jamaica	12.09	
6	8	Patricia Rodríguez	Colombia	12.11	
7	6	Dagmar Rosado	Puerto Rico	12.12	
8	2	Kerry-Ann Richards	Jamaica	12.19	

=== 200 metres ===
Heats – 25 November
Wind:
Heat 1: +0.61 m/s, Heat 2: +1.06 m/s

Rank	Heat	Name	Nationality	Time	Notes
1	1	Idalmis Bonne	Cuba	23.26	Q
2	2	Liliana Allen	Cuba	23.45	Q
3	2	Nikole Mitchell	Jamaica	23.45	Q
4	2	Ximena Restrepo	Colombia	23.47	Q
5	1	Chandra Sturrup	Bahamas	23.90	Q
6	1	Luanne Williams	Trinidad and Tobago	23.91	Q
7	2	Zoila Stewart	Costa Rica	23.92	q
8	1	Patricia Rodríguez	Colombia	24.12	q
9	1	Mayra Mayberry	Puerto Rico	24.21	
10	2	Alicia Tyson	Trinidad and Tobago	24.40	
11	1	Cherry Phillips	Jamaica	24.77	
12	1	Bernice Morton	Saint Kitts and Nevis	25.05	
13	2	Marsha Theophilus	United States Virgin Islands	25.56	
14	2	Arely Franco	El Salvador	25.95	

Final – 27 November

Wind: +1.60 m/s

Rank	Lane	Name	Nationality	Time	Notes
1st place, gold medalist(s)	5	Liliana Allen	Cuba	23.14	
2nd place, silver medalist(s)	4	Idalmis Bonne	Cuba	23.53	
3rd place, bronze medalist(s)	6	Ximena Restrepo	Colombia	23.88	
4	3	Nikole Mitchell	Jamaica	23.92	
5	1	Chandra Sturrup	Bahamas	23.94	
6	7	Zoila Stewart	Costa Rica	24.24	
7	8	Luanne Williams	Trinidad and Tobago	24.35	
8	2	Patricia Rodríguez	Colombia	24.39	

=== 400 metres ===
Heats – 24 November

Rank	Heat	Name	Nationality	Time	Notes
1	2	Nancy McLeón	Cuba	52.60	Q
2	1	Julia Duporty	Cuba	52.99	Q
3	2	Zoila Stewart	Costa Rica	53.16	Q
4	1	Claudine Williams	Jamaica	54.00	Q
5	2	Tanya Jarret	Jamaica	55.70	Q
6	1	Militza Castro	Puerto Rico	56.08	Q
7	1	Tonique Williams	Bahamas	56.98	q
8	1	Arely Franco	El Salvador	57.47	q
9	1	Vernetta Lesforis	Saint Lucia	59.29	
10	2	Rochelle Thomas	United States Virgin Islands	1:00.72	
11	2	Tamara Wigley	Saint Kitts and Nevis	1:02.35	
12	2	Wanda Betancourt	Puerto Rico	1:24.02	

Final – 25 November

Rank	Lane	Name	Nationality	Time	Notes
1st place, gold medalist(s)	5	Julia Duporty	Cuba	51.81	
2nd place, silver medalist(s)	4	Zoila Stewart	Costa Rica	52.57	
3rd place, bronze medalist(s)	3	Nancy McLeón	Cuba	52.59	
4	6	Claudine Williams	Jamaica	54.49	
5	1	Tanya Jarret	Jamaica	55.44	
6	8	Militza Castro	Puerto Rico	56.55	
7	2	Arely Franco	El Salvador	57.07	
8	7	Tonique Williams	Bahamas	58.71	

=== 800 metres ===
27 November

Rank	Name	Nationality	Time	Notes
1st place, gold medalist(s)	Letitia Vriesde	Suriname	2:04.28	
2nd place, silver medalist(s)	Ana Fidelia Quirot	Cuba	2:05.22	
3rd place, bronze medalist(s)	Daisy Ocasio	Puerto Rico	2:06.52	
4	Susana Díaz	Mexico	2:09.77	
5	Odalmis Limonta	Cuba	2:13.08	
6	Vernetta Lesforis	Saint Lucia	2:21.32	
	Rehalia Daniel	United States Virgin Islands	DNS	

=== 1500 metres ===
28 November

Rank	Name	Nationality	Time	Notes
1st place, gold medalist(s)	Letitia Vriesde	Suriname	4:18.45	
2nd place, silver medalist(s)	Isabel Juárez	Mexico	4:20.20	
3rd place, bronze medalist(s)	Susana Díaz	Mexico	4:21.45	
4	Daisy Ocasio	Puerto Rico	4:36.73	
5	Elsa Montenegro	Guatemala	4:38.67	
6	Maura Savón	Cuba	4:41.09	
	Elvina Huggins	Saint Kitts and Nevis	DNS	

=== 3000 metres ===
27 November

Rank	Name	Nationality	Time	Notes
1st place, gold medalist(s)	Isabel Juárez	Mexico	9:16.27	GR
2nd place, silver medalist(s)	Adriana Fernández	Mexico	9:18.93	
3rd place, bronze medalist(s)	Milagro Rodríguez	Cuba	9:22.36	
4	Yesenia Centeno	Cuba	9:30.22	
5	Aura Morales	Guatemala	9:59.86	
6	Carmen Serrano	Puerto Rico	10:06.49	
7	Elsa Montenegro	Guatemala	10:12.14	
8	Andrea Ohly	United States Virgin Islands	11:20.54	
9	Trictia Octave	Saint Lucia	11:53.98	
10	Elvina Huggins	Saint Kitts and Nevis	11:58.02	

=== 10,000 metres ===
24 November

Rank	Name	Nationality	Time	Notes
1st place, gold medalist(s)	María del Carmen Díaz	Mexico	34:49.67	
2nd place, silver medalist(s)	Lucía Rendón	Mexico	35:13.30	
3rd place, bronze medalist(s)	Carmen Serrano	Puerto Rico	36:19.66	
4	Isabel Tum	Guatemala	36:31.56	
5	Aura Morales	Guatemala	37:27.14	

=== Marathon ===
28 November

Rank	Name	Nationality	Time	Notes
1st place, gold medalist(s)	Emma Cabrera	Mexico	2:42:29	GR
2nd place, silver medalist(s)	María Elena Reyna	Mexico	2:43:39	
3rd place, bronze medalist(s)	Emperatriz Wilson	Cuba	2:54:41	
4	Migdalia Torres	Puerto Rico	2:55:41	
5	Isabel Tum	Guatemala	3:02:24	

=== 100 metres hurdles ===
24 November
Wind: -2.14 m/s

Rank	Lane	Name	Nationality	Time	Notes
1st place, gold medalist(s)	5	Aliuska López	Cuba	13.46	
2nd place, silver medalist(s)	3	Oraidis Ramírez	Cuba	13.49	
3rd place, bronze medalist(s)	4	Joyce Meléndez	Puerto Rico	14.22	
4	6	Ivette Sánchez	Panama	15.44	

=== 400 metres hurdles ===
28 November

Rank	Lane	Name	Nationality	Time	Notes
1st place, gold medalist(s)	4	Lency Montelier	Cuba	57.61	
2nd place, silver medalist(s)	2	Maribelsy Peña	Colombia	58.68	
3rd place, bronze medalist(s)	7	Wynsome Cole	Jamaica	1:00.23	
4	5	Alejandra Quintanar	Mexico	1:00.38	
5	6	Ivette Sánchez	Panama	1:03.78	
6	3	Gladys López	Puerto Rico	1:04.51	

=== 4 × 100 metres relay ===
25 November

Rank	Lane	Team	Name	Time	Notes
1st place, gold medalist(s)	3	Cuba	Miriam Ferrer, Aliuska López, Julia Duporty, Liliana Allen	44.59	
2nd place, silver medalist(s)	7	Colombia	Elia Mera, Ximena Restrepo, Patricia Rodríguez, Norfalia Carabalí	44.62	
3rd place, bronze medalist(s)	6	Jamaica	Cherry Phillips, Kerry-Ann Richards, Shelly Berth, Nikole Mitchell	45.75	
4	2	Puerto Rico	Xiomara Dávila, Dagmar Rosado, Joyce Meléndez, Mayra Mayberry	46.03	
5	4	Trinidad and Tobago	Luanne Williams, Robertha Forbes, Alicia Tyson, Charmine Wilson	46.76	
6	5	United States Virgin Islands	Marsha Theophilus, Rochelle Thomas, Ameerah Bello, Ruth Morris	47.76	

=== 4 × 400 metres relay ===
28 November

Rank	Lane	Team	Name	Time	Notes
1st place, gold medalist(s)	5	Cuba	Idalmis Bonne, Julia Duporty, Lency Montelier, Nancy McLeón	3:31.27	
2nd place, silver medalist(s)	6	Colombia	Patricia Rodríguez, Maribelcy Peña, Elia Mera, Norfalia Carabalí	3:36.82	
3rd place, bronze medalist(s)	3	Jamaica	Wynsome Cole, Shelly Berth, Tanya Jarret, Claudine Williams	3:37.72	
4	4	Puerto Rico	Xiomara Dávila, Militza Castro, Wanda Betancourt, Mayra Mayberry	3:39.51	

=== 10,000 metres walk ===
25 November

Rank	Name	Nationality	Time	Notes
1st place, gold medalist(s)	María Colín	Mexico	47:57.20	
2nd place, silver medalist(s)	Liliana Bermeo	Colombia	49:21.18	
3rd place, bronze medalist(s)	Magdalena Guzmán	El Salvador	53:16.81	
4	Alexis Rodríguez	Puerto Rico	1:00:10.35	
	Rosario Sánchez	Mexico	DQ	
	María Amborsio	Guatemala	DQ	

=== Long jump ===
23 November

Rank	Name	Nationality	#1	#2	#3	#4	#5	#6	Result	Notes
1st place, gold medalist(s)	Niurka Montalvo	Cuba	6.00	6.26	x	6.26	6.28	6.37	6.37	
2nd place, silver medalist(s)	Eloína Echevarría	Cuba	5.58w	5.67	5.85	5.84	5.91w	5.78	5.91w	
3rd place, bronze medalist(s)	Suzette Lee	Jamaica	5.39	5.53	4.24	5.21	5.49	5.34	5.53	
4	Lucy Gibbes	Saint Kitts and Nevis	x	x	5.35	5.29	x	x	5.35	
5	Roatter Johnson	Saint Kitts and Nevis	5.01	x	x	5.26	x	5.14	5.26	

=== Triple jump ===
28 November

Rank	Name	Nationality	#1	#2	#3	#4	#5	#6	Result	Notes
1st place, gold medalist(s)	Niurka Montalvo	Cuba	13.34	13.57	x	x	13.16	13.29	13.57	GR
2nd place, silver medalist(s)	Eloína Echevarría	Cuba	x	12.65	13.02	12.78	x	12.97	13.02	
3rd place, bronze medalist(s)	Suzette Lee	Jamaica	12.07	12.31	12.08	12.01	12.40	12.17	12.40	
4	Citlali Saenz	Mexico	x	x	11.69	11.64	11.58	11.64	11.69	
5	María Fleischmann	Guatemala	11.64	11.63	x	x	11.55	11.47	11.64	
6	Arely Franco	El Salvador	x	11.06	x	x	x	x	11.06	

=== Shot put ===
24 November

Rank	Name	Nationality	#1	#2	#3	#4	#5	#6	Result	Notes
1st place, gold medalist(s)	Herminia Fernández	Cuba	17.74	x	17.38	x	x	18.00	18.00	
2nd place, silver medalist(s)	Yumileidi Cumbá	Cuba	16.34	17.02	16.99	17.12	17.66	17.67	17.67	
3rd place, bronze medalist(s)	Laverne Eve	Bahamas	15.11	13.94	15.08	15.35	x	14.95	15.35	
4	Liliam Rivera	Puerto Rico	14.78	15.13	x	13.62	14.08	14.95	15.13	
5	María Isabel Urrutia	Colombia	13.21	14.91	12.76	14.68	14.14	13.47	14.68	
6	Touvia Arndell	Saint Kitts and Nevis	11.49	12.00	x	11.75	x	11.46	12.00	
7	María Lourdes Ruiz	Nicaragua	9.78	10.91	11.57	11.26	11.47	11.00	11.57	
8	Nelly Acosta	Puerto Rico	10.67	10.93	10.97	10.52	11.26	10.90	11.26	

=== Discus throw ===
28 November

Rank	Name	Nationality	#1	#2	#3	#4	#5	#6	Result	Notes
1st place, gold medalist(s)	Bárbara Hechevarría	Cuba	61.02	x	60.42	x	x	57.68	61.02	
2nd place, silver medalist(s)	Maritza Martén	Cuba	x	59.44	x	x	57.46	x	59.44	
3rd place, bronze medalist(s)	María Isabel Urrutia	Colombia	53.12	52.08	51.94	49.12	46.14	48.24	53.12	
4	Liliam Rivera	Puerto Rico	x	x	50.74	x	48.62	x	50.74	
5	María Lourdes Ruiz	Nicaragua	42.50	44.18	x	42.08	38.40	38.84	44.18	
6	Angela Jackson	Barbados	39.04	41.70	41.60	41.64	40.54	x	41.70	
7	Nelly Acosta	Puerto Rico	x	x	35.02	x	40.12	x	40.12	
8	Charlene Springer	United States Virgin Islands	33.12	32.70	28.00	30.92	x	33.28	33.28	

=== Javelin throw ===
25 November

Rank	Name	Nationality	#1	#2	#3	#4	#5	#6	Result	Notes
1st place, gold medalist(s)	Isel López	Cuba	55.96	61.48	56.46	x	x	x	61.48	
2nd place, silver medalist(s)	Xiomara Rivero	Cuba	56.22	56.22	57.02	55.44	56.82	56.46	57.02	
3rd place, bronze medalist(s)	Patricia Alonso	Venezuela	48.98	46.88	45.42	49.44	46.68	50.36	50.36	
4	María González	Puerto Rico	46.52	46.56	46.40	x	x	47.10	47.10	
5	Terrylyn Paynter	Bermuda	42.50	45.30	x	41.78	45.20	37.36	45.30	
6	Touvia Arndell	Saint Kitts and Nevis	38.70	x	x	35.66	x	38.58	38.70	
7	Rhonda Henry	Grenada	35.88	x	37.74	35.42	35.95	x	37.74	

=== Heptathlon ===
27–28 November

The highest mark recorded in each event is highlighted in yellow

Rank	Name	Nationality	100m H	HJ	SP	200m	LJ	JT	800m	Points	Notes
1st place, gold medalist(s)	Magalys García	Cuba	13.90	1.73	13.26	24.62	5.71	47.52	2:23.42	5903	GR
2nd place, silver medalist(s)	Regla Cárdenas	Cuba	13.98	1.76	13.21	24.67	6.10	36.62	2:23.68	5838	
3rd place, bronze medalist(s)	Zorobabelia Córdoba	Colombia	14.37	1.52	11.88	25.05	5.41	48.70	2:28.58	5326	
4	Carmen Nieves	Puerto Rico	14.99	1.61	11.76	26.11	4.81	35.72	2:29.38	4824	
5	Sheila Acosta	Puerto Rico	15.15	1.49	10.90	27.28	5.09	NM	2:39.38	3886	
	Touvia Arndell	Saint Kitts and Nevis	21.80	1.43	12.19	29.15	4.74	32.02	DNS	DNF	
