= 1992 Ibero-American Championships in Athletics – Results =

These are the results of the 1992 Ibero-American Championships in Athletics which took place from 17 to 19 July 1992 at Estadio de La Cartuja in Seville, Spain.

== Men's results ==
=== 100 meters ===
Heat 1 – 17 July
Wind: +0.9 m/s

Rank	Name	Nationality	Time	Notes
1	Andrés Simón	Cuba	10.55	Q
2	Carlos Gats	Argentina	10.72	Q
3	Florencio Gascón	Spain	10.81	Guest
4	Robinson Urrutia	Colombia	10.87	
5	Carlos García	Dominican Republic	11.06	
6	Rubén Gutiérrez	Bolivia	11.47	
7	Roger Argüello	Nicaragua	11.54	

Heat 2 – 17 July
Wind: -1.4 m/s

Rank	Name	Nationality	Time	Notes
1	André da Silva	Brazil	10.58	Q
2	Wenceslao Ferrín	Colombia	10.70	Q
3	Eduardo Nava	Mexico	10.70	
4	Pedro Agostinho	Portugal	10.78	
5	Lizandro Cruceta	Dominican Republic	11.33	
6	Juan Lobo	Honduras	11.73	

Heat 3 – 17 July
Wind: -0.7 m/s

Rank	Name	Nationality	Time	Notes
1	Jorge Luis Aguilera	Cuba	10.50	Guest
2	Juan Jesús Trapero	Spain	10.52	Q
3	Genaro Rojas	Mexico	10.82	Q
4	José María Beduino	Argentina	10.94	
5	Dick Perlaza	Ecuador	11.21	
6	Miguel Rivera	Guatemala	11.31	
7	Manuel Gonnell	Dominican Republic	11.33	Guest

Heat 4 – 17 July
Wind: -1.4 m/s

Rank	Name	Nationality	Time	Notes
1	Joel Isasi	Cuba	10.41	Q
2	Arnaldo da Silva	Brazil	10.44	Q
3	Sergio López	Spain	10.58	
4	Carlos Moreno	Chile	10.68	
5	Florencio Aguilar	Panama	10.99	
6	Carlos Fernández	Portugal	11.05	Guest
7	Carlos Santos	Puerto Rico	11.09	
8	Carlos Lino	Honduras	11.33	

Final – 17 July
Wind: -2.2 m/s

Rank	Name	Nationality	Time	Notes
1st place, gold medalist(s)	Joel Isasi	Cuba	10.41	
2nd place, silver medalist(s)	Andrés Simón	Cuba	10.52	
3rd place, bronze medalist(s)	Arnaldo da Silva	Brazil	10.54	
4	André da Silva	Brazil	10.63	
5	Juan Jesús Trapero	Spain	10.69	
6	Carlos Gats	Argentina	10.83	
7	Wenceslao Ferrín	Colombia	10.86	
8	Genaro Rojas	Mexico	11.23	

=== 200 meters ===
Heat 1 – 18 July
Wind: +0.7 m/s

Rank	Name	Nationality	Time	Notes
1	Robson da Silva	Brazil	21.23	Q
2	Enrique Talavera	Spain	21.55	Guest
3	Jhon Jairo Mena	Colombia	21.88	Q
4	Carlos Morales	Chile	22.04	
5	Manuel Gonnell	Dominican Republic	22.80	

Heat 2 – 18 July
Wind: +0.8 m/s

Rank	Name	Nationality	Time	Notes
1	Joel Lamela	Cuba	21.04	Q
2	Sérgio Menezes	Brazil	21.14	Q
3	Luis Cunha	Portugal	21.52	
4	Carlos Moreno	Chile	21.79	
5	Miguel Rivera	Guatemala	22.78	
6	Carlos Lino	Honduras	23.19	

Heat 3 – 18 July
Wind: +1.2 m/s

Rank	Name	Nationality	Time	Notes
1	Félix Stevens	Cuba	21.31	Q
2	Miguel Ángel Gómez	Spain	21.44	Q
3	Carlos Santos	Puerto Rico	22.59	
4	Rubén Gutiérrez	Bolivia	22.68	
5	Juan Lobo	Honduras	23.55	
6	Roger Argüello	Nicaragua	24.13	

Heat 4 – 18 July
Wind: +0.2 m/s

Rank	Name	Nationality	Time	Notes
1	Luis Rodríguez	Spain	21.36	Q
2	Carlos Gats	Argentina	21.40	Q
3	Wenceslao Ferrín	Colombia	21.44	
4	Carlos García	Dominican Republic	22.07	
5	Alexander Knight	Panama	22.23	
	Dick Perlaza	Ecuador	DQ	

Final – 18 July
Wind: -2.6 m/s

Rank	Name	Nationality	Time	Notes
1st place, gold medalist(s)	Robson da Silva	Brazil	20.58	
2nd place, silver medalist(s)	Joel Lamela	Cuba	21.12	
3rd place, bronze medalist(s)	Sérgio Menezes	Brazil	21.44	
4	Luis Rodríguez	Spain	21.50	
5	Miguel Ángel Gómez	Spain	21.53	
6	Carlos Gats	Argentina	21.98	
7	Jhon Jairo Mena	Colombia	22.05	
	Félix Stevens	Cuba	DNS	

=== 400 meters ===
Heat 1 – 17 July

Rank	Name	Nationality	Time	Notes
1	Sidnei de Souza	Brazil	46.59	Q
2	Manuel Moreno	Spain	47.20	Q
3	Raymundo Escalante	Mexico	47.31	
4	Alejandro Krauss	Chile	48.11	
5	Dick Perlaza	Ecuador	48.80	
6	Marcelo Reyes	Bolivia	52.91	

Heat 2 – 17 July

Rank	Name	Nationality	Time	Notes
1	Inaldo Sena	Brazil	46.16	Q
2	Jorge Valentín	Cuba	46.49	Q
3	Ángel Heras	Spain	46.78	q
4	Wilson Cañizales	Colombia	47.26	
5	Carlos Morales	Chile	47.62	
6	Guillermo Cacián	Argentina	48.46	

Heat 3 – 17 July

Rank	Name	Nationality	Time	Notes
1	Roberto Hernández	Cuba	46.37	Q
2	Henry Aguiar	Venezuela	46.58	Q
3	Pedro Curvelo	Portugal	46.81	q
4	Josué Morales	Mexico	48.09	
5	Claudio Arcas	Argentina	48.44	
	Alfredo Peredo	Bolivia	DQ	IAAF Rule 141.2

Final – 18 July

Rank	Name	Nationality	Time	Notes
1st place, gold medalist(s)	Sidnei de Souza	Brazil	45.38	
2nd place, silver medalist(s)	Inaldo Sena	Brazil	46.14	
3rd place, bronze medalist(s)	Henry Aguiar	Venezuela	46.29	
4	Jorge Valentín	Cuba	46.29	
5	Ángel Heras	Spain	46.52	
6	Pedro Curvelo	Portugal	46.72	
7	Manuel Moreno	Spain	47.16	
	Roberto Hernández	Cuba	DNS	

=== 800 meters ===
Heat 1 – 17 July

Rank	Name	Nationality	Time	Notes
1	Edgar de Oliveira	Brazil	1:50.29	Q
2	Héctor Herrera	Cuba	1:50.35	Q
3	Diego Córdoba	Colombia	1:51.40	
4	Luis Martínez	Guatemala	1:53.11	
5	Carlos Madrigal	Costa Rica	1:54.12	
6	Jorge Isaac Rojas	Costa Rica	1:54.25	
7	César Martínez	Honduras	2:03.18	

Heat 2 – 17 July

Rank	Name	Nationality	Time	Notes
1	Gilmar Santos	Brazil	1:49.48	Q
2	Pablo Squella	Chile	1:49.48	Q
3	Luis Karim Toledo	Mexico	1:49.66	q
4	José Costa	Portugal	1:50.73	q
5	Andrés Manuel Díaz	Spain	1:51.26	
6	Carlos Mairena	Nicaragua	1:51.60	

Heat 3 – 17 July

Rank	Name	Nationality	Time	Notes
1	Luis Javier González	Spain	1:51.89	Q
2	Luis Migueles	Argentina	1:51.98	Q
3	Arturo Espejel	Mexico	1:52.09	
4	Porfirio Méndez	Paraguay	1:52.77	
5	Manuel Balmaceda	Chile	1:52.85	
6	Carlos Santos	Portugal	1:53.21	

Final – 18 July

Rank	Name	Nationality	Time	Notes
1st place, gold medalist(s)	Héctor Herrera	Cuba	1:47.72	
2nd place, silver medalist(s)	Pablo Squella	Chile	1:48.29	
3rd place, bronze medalist(s)	Edgar de Oliveira	Brazil	1:48.38	
4	Gilmar Santos	Brazil	1:48.45	
5	Luis Migueles	Argentina	1:48.61	
6	Luis Karim Toledo	Mexico	1:48.71	
	Luis Javier González	Spain	DNS	
	José Costa	Portugal	DNS	

=== 1500 meters ===
Final – 19 July

Rank	Name	Nationality	Time	Notes
1st place, gold medalist(s)	Víctor Rojas	Spain	3:42.25	
2nd place, silver medalist(s)	Ángel Fariñas	Spain	3:42.76	
3rd place, bronze medalist(s)	Edgar de Oliveira	Brazil	3:43.26	
4	José Gregorio López	Venezuela	3:48.47	
5	Arturo Espejel	Mexico	3:48.92	
6	Sergio Rodríguez	Mexico	3:48.96	
7	Luis Martínez	Guatemala	3:50.13	
8	Leonardo Malgor	Argentina	3:52.19	
9	Carlos Mairena	Nicaragua	3:54.15	
10	Porfirio Méndez	Paraguay	3:54.42	
11	Carlos Santos	Portugal	3:59.04	
12	Dagoberto Pérez	El Salvador	4:03.21	
13	César Martínez	Honduras	4:14.79	

=== 5000 meters ===
Final – 19 July

Rank	Name	Nationality	Time	Notes
1st place, gold medalist(s)	Valdenor dos Santos	Brazil	13:54.79	
2nd place, silver medalist(s)	Anacleto Jiménez	Spain	13:55.35	
3rd place, bronze medalist(s)	Martín Fiz	Spain	13:57.99	
4	Antonio Silio	Argentina	14:00.97	
5	José Dias	Portugal	14:02.58	
6	Alejandro Salvador	Mexico	14:05.36	
7	José Ramos	Portugal	14:09.84	
8	Isaac García	Mexico	14:11.48	
9	Antonio Ibáñez	Argentina	14:47.39	
10	Néstor Quinapanta	Ecuador	14:56.91	
11	Policarpio Calizaya	Bolivia	15:08.59	
12	Nelson Zamora	Uruguay	15:21.06	

=== 10,000 meters ===
Final – 17 July

Rank	Name	Nationality	Time	Notes
1st place, gold medalist(s)	Francisco Guerra	Spain	28:49.15	
2nd place, silver medalist(s)	Valdenor dos Santos	Brazil	28:51.22	
3rd place, bronze medalist(s)	Rolando Vera	Ecuador	28:55.16	
4	Faustino Reynoso	Mexico	28:58.47	
5	Juvenal Ribeiro	Portugal	29:33.96	
6	Antonio Ibáñez	Argentina	29:36.60	
7	Eliecer López	Costa Rica	30:46.30	
8	Eladio Fernández	Paraguay	31:08.80	
	Roberto Punina	Ecuador	DNF	
	Pedro Pérez	Venezuela	DNF	
	Policarpio Calizaya	Bolivia	DNF	
	Waldemar Cotelo	Uruguay	DNF	
	Nelson Zamora	Uruguay	DNF	

=== 3000 meters steeplechase ===
Final – 19 July

Rank	Name	Nationality	Time	Notes
1st place, gold medalist(s)	Clodoaldo do Carmo	Brazil	8:38.55	
2nd place, silver medalist(s)	Eduardo Henriques	Portugal	8:40.35	
3rd place, bronze medalist(s)	Antonio Peula	Spain	8:40.93	
4	Gustavo Castillo	Mexico	8:42.90	
5	Marcelo Cascabelo	Argentina	8:43.21	
6	Jon Azkueta	Spain	8:54.34	
7	Oscar Amaya	Argentina	9:01.85	
8	Rubén García	Mexico	9:02.34	

=== 110 meters hurdles ===
Heat 1 – 18 July
Wind: -2.8 m/s

Rank	Name	Nationality	Time	Notes
1	Emilio Valle	Cuba	14.02	Q
2	Joilto Bonfim	Brazil	14.37	Q
3	Paulo Barrigana	Portugal	14.82	
4	Oscar Ratto	Argentina	14.88	
5	Vladimir Aponte	Bolivia	15.73	

Heat 2 – 18 July
Wind: -3.5 m/s

Rank	Name	Nationality	Time	Notes
1	Carlos Sala	Spain	14.34	Q
2	Roberto Carmona	Mexico	14.73	Q
3	Federico Ifill	Venezuela	14.76	q
4	Rudel Franco	El Salvador	15.71	
	Ricardo D'Andrilli	Argentina	DQ	

Heat 3 – 18 July
Wind: -2.8 m/s

Rank	Name	Nationality	Time	Notes
1	Alexis Sánchez	Cuba	14.17	Q
2	Antonio Lanau	Spain	14.58	Q
3	Miguel Soto	Puerto Rico	14.58	q
4	Sidney Clark	Panama	15.25	
	Valery Abugattas	Peru	DNF	

Final – 18 July
Wind: -0.6 m/s

Rank	Name	Nationality	Time	Notes
1st place, gold medalist(s)	Emilio Valle	Cuba	13.41	
2nd place, silver medalist(s)	Alexis Sánchez	Cuba	13.66	
3rd place, bronze medalist(s)	Carlos Sala	Spain	13.76	
4	Joilto Bonfim	Brazil	13.88	
5	Federico Ifill	Venezuela	14.23	
6	Miguel Soto	Puerto Rico	14.24	
7	Roberto Carmona	Mexico	14.30	
8	Antonio Lanau	Spain	14.42	

=== 400 meters hurdles ===
Heat 1 – 17 July

Rank	Name	Nationality	Time	Notes
1	Domingo Cordero	Puerto Rico	50.40	Q
2	Antonio Smith	Venezuela	50.73	Q
3	Amado Amador	Mexico	51.45	q
4	Mauro Mina	Peru	52.37	
5	Mauricio Carranza	El Salvador	54.18	
6	Francisco Flores	Honduras	54.58	

Heat 2 – 17 July

Rank	Name	Nationality	Time	Notes
1	Pedro Piñera	Cuba	50.81	Q
2	Juan Vallín	Mexico	51.37	Q
3	Mario Reis	Portugal	51.81	q
4	Llimy Rivas	Colombia	52.67	
5	Antonio Leite	Portugal	52.94	Guest
6	Julio da Silva	Uruguay	55.21	

Heat 3 – 17 July

Rank	Name	Nationality	Time	Notes
1	Eronilde de Araújo	Brazil	51.23	Q
2	Santiago Fraga	Spain	51.85	Q
3	Luis Bello	Venezuela	52.06	
4	Paulo Curvelo	Portugal	52.86	
5	Erick Krings	Guatemala	53.02	
6	Fernando Marzano	Argentina	54.61	

Final – 18 July

Rank	Name	Nationality	Time	Notes
1st place, gold medalist(s)	Eronilde de Araújo	Brazil	50.06	
2nd place, silver medalist(s)	Juan Vallín	Mexico	50.26	
3rd place, bronze medalist(s)	Pedro Piñera	Cuba	50.37	
4	Antonio Smith	Venezuela	50.78	
5	Domingo Cordero	Puerto Rico	51.25	
6	Amado Amador	Mexico	51.65	
7	Mario Reis	Portugal	51.70	
8	Santiago Fraga	Spain	51.88	

=== High jump ===
Final – 19 July

Rank	Name	Nationality	Attempts															Result	Notes
Rank	Name	Nationality	1.85	1.90	1.95	2.00	2.05	2.10	2.14	2.17	2.20	2.22	2.24	2.26	2.30	2.32	2.34	Result	Notes
1st place, gold medalist(s)	Javier Sotomayor	Cuba	–	–	–	–	–	–	–	–	o	–	–	–	xxo	–	–	2.30	
2nd place, silver medalist(s)	Gustavo Adolfo Becker	Spain	–	–	–	–	–	o	–	o	–	xo	–	xxo	–	xxx		2.26	
3rd place, bronze medalist(s)	Marino Drake	Cuba	–	–	–	–	–	–	–	o	–	–	o	–	xxx			2.24	
4	Carlos de la Peña	Spain	–	o	o	o	xo	o	o	xxx								2.14	
5	Fernando Moreno	Argentina	–	–	–	o	o	xxo	o	xxx								2.14	
6	Hugo Muñoz	Peru	–	–	–	o	o	o	xxo	xxx								2.14	
7	Valery Abugattas	Peru	–	–	o	o	xxo	o	xxo	xxx								2.14	
8	Ricardo D'Andrilli	Argentina	–	–	o	o	o	xxx										2.05	
8	José Luís Mendes	Brazil	–	–	–	o	o	xxx										2.05	
10	Esteves Costa	Portugal	–	–	o	o	xo	xxx										2.05	
11	Humberto Sarubbi	Paraguay	o	o	xxx													1.90	

=== Pole vault ===
Final – 18 July

Rank	Name	Nationality	Attempts											Result	Notes
Rank	Name	Nationality	4.20	4.40	4.60	4.80	4.90	5.00	5.10	5.20	5.30	5.40	5.54	Result	Notes
1st place, gold medalist(s)	Edgar Díaz	Puerto Rico	–	–	–	–	–	–	–	xo	–	o	xxx	5.40	
2nd place, silver medalist(s)	Nuno Fernandes	Portugal	–	–	–	–	–	xxo	–	o	o	xxx		5.30	
3rd place, bronze medalist(s)	Alberto Ruiz	Spain	–	–	–	–	–	–	–	xo	–	xxx		5.20	
4	Thomas Riether	Chile	–	–	–	–	–	–	xo	–	xxx			5.10	
5	Cristian Aspillaga	Chile	–	–	o	xo	o	xo	xxx					5.00	
6	Miguel Saldarriaga	Colombia	–	–	–	–	xo	–	xxx					4.90	
7	Guillermo Salgado	Mexico	–	–	o	o	xxo	xxx						4.90	
8	Konstatín Zagustín	Venezuela	–	–	o	xo	–	xxx						4.80	
9	Oscar Veit	Argentina	–	–	xo	xo	xxx							4.80	
10	Renato Bortolocci	Brazil	x-	xo	o	xo	xxx							4.80	
11	Fernando Pastoriza	Argentina	–	–	xxo	x-								4.60	
	Pedro Palma	Portugal	–	–	–	–	–	xxx						NM	
	Igor Castillo	Peru	–	–	xxx									NM	
	Ángel García	Cuba	–	–	–	–	–	–	–	–	–	xxx		NM	
	Pedro da Silva Filho	Brazil	xxx											NM	
	Juan Gabriel Concepción	Spain	–	–	–	–	–	–						NM	

=== Long jump ===
Final – 17 July

Rank	Name	Nationality	Attempts						Result	Notes
Rank	Name	Nationality	1	2	3	4	5	6	Result	Notes
1st place, gold medalist(s)	Iván Pedroso	Cuba	8.17 (+1.4)	x	x	8.32 w (+2.4)	8.53 (+1.6)	x	8.53 (+1.6 m/s)	
2nd place, silver medalist(s)	Jesús Oliván	Spain	7.94 (+1.7)	x	x	x	–	7.98 (+2.0)	7.98 (+2.0 m/s)	
3rd place, bronze medalist(s)	Elmer Williams	Puerto Rico	7.55 w (+2.2)	7.86 w (+2.6)	7.39 (+1.8)	7.91 (+1.4)	x	x	7.91 (+1.4 m/s)	
4	Márcio da Cruz	Brazil	6.15 w (+2.4)	7.67 w (+2.1)	7.69 w (+2.2)	6.39 w (+2.5)	6.01 (+1.7)	7.71 (+1.6)	7.71 (+1.6 m/s)	
5	Michael Francis	Puerto Rico	7.38 (+2.0)	7.53 (+1.4)	7.47 w (+2.1)	7.70 (+1.8)	7.57 (+1.5)	7.58 (+2.0)	7.70 (+1.8 m/s)	
6	Antonio Corgos	Spain	7.67 w (+2.2)	5.83 (+1.4)	–	x	7.69 w (+2.8)	–	7.69 w (+2.8 m/s)	
7	Juan Carlos Moeckel	Chile	7.52 (+1.7)	7.46 w (+2.4)	7.42 w (+2.2)	x	x	x	7.52 (+1.7 m/s)	
8	Gerardo Guevara	Mexico	x	x	7.52 w (+2.3)	6.80 w (+2.7)	x	x	7.52 w (+2.3 m/s)	
9	Darío Ruiz	Mexico	7.22 w (+2.6)	x	7.28 w (+2.6)				7.28 w (+2.6 m/s)	
10	José Leitão	Portugal	6.96 w (+3.1)	x	7.16 (+2.0)				7.16 (+2.0 m/s)	
11	Jorge Casierra	Ecuador	6.86 w (+2.5)	7.10 w (+2.9)	6.93 w (+2.2)				7.10 w (+2.9 m/s)	
12	Oscar Valiente	Peru	6.68 (+1.4)	6.90 w (+2.7)	7.10 w (+2.7)				7.10 w (+2.7 m/s)	
13	Ramiro Villarroel	Bolivia	6.78 (+0.5)	7.07 w (+3.3)	7.09 (+1.9)				7.09 (+1.9 m/s)	
14	Pedro da Silva Filho	Brazil	x	6.79 w (+2.2)	x				6.79 w (+2.2 m/s)	
15	Alfredo Williams	Nicaragua	x	6.66 (+1.5)	6.76 (+1.6)				6.76 (+1.6 m/s)	
16	Howard Pandy	Honduras	6.17 (+1.6)	4.60 (+1.6)	6.21 w (+2.2)				6.21 w (+2.2 m/s)	
	Esteves Costa	Portugal	x	x	x				NM	
	Arturo Piccardo	Paraguay	x	x	–				NM	
	Juan Felipe Ortiz	Cuba	–	–					NM	

=== Triple jump ===
Final – 19 July

Rank	Name	Nationality	Attempts						Result	Notes
Rank	Name	Nationality	1	2	3	4	5	6	Result	Notes
1st place, gold medalist(s)	Yoelbi Quesada	Cuba	16.52 (+1.6)	16.91 (+1.3)	x	16.93 w (+2.2)	–	16.79 (+1.1)	16.93 w (+2.2 m/s)	
2nd place, silver medalist(s)	Anísio Silva	Brazil	16.40 (+0.3)	–	–	–	–	–	16.40 (+0.3 m/s)	
3rd place, bronze medalist(s)	Juan Miguel López	Cuba	16.36 w (+2.9)	16.18 (+0.3)	16.27 (+1.4)	x	16.21 (+1.6)	15.80 (+1.7)	16.36 w (+2.9 m/s)	
4	Oscar Valiente	Peru	15.23 w (+2.2)	15.75 (+1.5)	15.96 (+1.2)	15.94 (+0.7)	15.84 w (+2.2)	x	15.96 (+1.2 m/s)	
5	Jorge da Silva	Brazil	x	15.78 (+1.1)	–	–	–	–	15.78 (+1.1 m/s)	
6	José Leitão	Portugal	15.00 (+1.9)	x	15.26 (+1.8)	15.33 (+1.8)	15.46 (+1.5)	15.53 (+1.9)	15.53 (+1.9 m/s)	
7	Raúl Chapado	Spain	x	15.31 (+1.4)	15.53 w (+2.6)	15.10 (+1.0)	–	15.19 (+0.0)	15.53 w (+2.6 m/s)	
8	Darío Ruiz	Mexico	15.22 w (+2.7)	15.44 (+1.5)	x	x	x	x	15.44 (+1.5 m/s)	
9	Fernando Pecchenino	Argentina	15.02 w (+2.1)	14.84 (+0.6)	15.20 (+1.9)				15.20 (+1.9 m/s)	
10	Jorge Casierra	Ecuador	x	x	14.46 (+1.5)				14.46 (+1.5 m/s)	
11	Howard Pandy	Honduras	13.93 (+1.8)	x	14.10 (+1.8)				14.10 (+1.8 m/s)	

=== Shot put ===
Final – 18 July

Rank	Name	Nationality	Attempts						Result	Notes
Rank	Name	Nationality	1	2	3	4	5	6	Result	Notes
1st place, gold medalist(s)	Gert Weil	Chile	18.62	18.94	x	x	18.78	x	18.94	
2nd place, silver medalist(s)	Manuel Martínez	Spain	17.12	16.80	16.59	17.49	16.48	x	17.49	
3rd place, bronze medalist(s)	Adilson Oliveira	Brazil	15.18	17.14	17.44	17.05	17.31	17.39	17.44	
4	Vicente Navarro	Spain	16.01	16.67	x	16.09	16.39	x	16.67	
5	Francisco Ball	Puerto Rico	15.34	15.93	15.71	x	x	16.31	16.31	
6	Ubaldo Peñalba	Argentina	15.23	15.18	15.18	15.29	x	16.21	16.21	
7	Fernando Alves	Portugal	15.76	x	x	x	15.84	x	15.84	
8	Adrián Marzo	Argentina	x	14.97	x	x	x	14.99	14.99	
9	Jaime Comandari	El Salvador	14.96	14.75	14.39				14.96	
10	Yoger Medina	Venezuela	x	14.78	x				14.78	
11	Antonio Peixoto	Portugal	13.01	12.40	13.58				13.58	
12	Francisco Rosales	Nicaragua	12.44	11.76	12.75				12.75	

=== Discus throw ===
Final – 17 July

Rank	Name	Nationality	Attempts						Result	Notes
Rank	Name	Nationality	1	2	3	4	5	6	Result	Notes
1st place, gold medalist(s)	Juan Martínez	Cuba	62.34	62.24	x	x	62.12	63.02	63.02	
2nd place, silver medalist(s)	David Martínez	Spain	56.22	61.56	61.36	60.76	58.80	x	61.56	
	Roberto Moya	Cuba	x	61.52	x				61.52	Guest
3rd place, bronze medalist(s)	Luis Mariano Delís	Cuba	59.42	x	60.80	61.18	60.26	60.84	61.18	
4	Ramón Jiménez Gaona	Paraguay	58.54	x	56.74	57.94	59.78	x	59.78	
5	João Joaquim dos Santos	Brazil	55.96	53.24	50.62	x	51.78	x	55.96	
6	Luis Lizaso	Spain	50.48	51.42	52.72	51.04	x	53.04	53.04	
7	Fernando Alves	Portugal	50.50	50.34	51.66	49.94	x	51.08	51.66	
8	Yoger Medina	Venezuela	49.80	x	50.40				50.40	
9	Julio Piñero	Argentina	48.38	49.48	49.24				49.48	
10	Marcelo Pugliese	Argentina	49.08	x	x				49.08	
11	Francisco Ayala	Mexico	48.06	x	x				48.06	
12	Antonio Peixoto	Portugal	44.60	45.60	43.58				45.60	
13	Francisco Rosales	Nicaragua	38.10	35.10	33.80				38.10	

=== Hammer throw ===
Final – 17 July

Rank	Name	Nationality	Attempts						Result	Notes
Rank	Name	Nationality	1	2	3	4	5	6	Result	Notes
1st place, gold medalist(s)	Eladio Hernández	Cuba	67.34	x	66.36	70.62	68.64	x	70.62	
2nd place, silver medalist(s)	Andrés Charadía	Argentina	68.30	68.72	69.38	x	67.44	63.54	69.38	
3rd place, bronze medalist(s)	Guillermo Guzmán	Mexico	64.86	67.36	63.80	65.70	67.68	68.06	68.06	
4	Adrián Marzo	Argentina	x	64.08	66.10	67.00	67.72	x	67.72	
5	Antón María Godall	Spain	63.40	64.06	66.48	66.36	66.70	65.86	66.70	
6	Antonio Peixoto	Portugal	56.76	60.78	61.90	59.68	57.26	x	61.90	
7	Pedro Rivail Atilio	Brazil	57.74	58.14	60.04	x	x	x	60.04	
8	Mario Rocha	Portugal	x	56.30	x	57.62	x	x	57.62	
9	Rubén Torres	Ecuador	49.90	50.38	52.10				52.10	
10	Enrique Reina	Honduras	x	45.92	x				45.92	
11	Felipe Aguilar	Honduras	32.38	34.30	33.46				34.30	

=== Javelin throw ===
Final – 19 July

Rank	Name	Nationality	Attempts						Result	Notes
Rank	Name	Nationality	1	2	3	4	5	6	Result	Notes
1st place, gold medalist(s)	Ramón González	Cuba	75.88	73.60	73.56	x	x	71.10	75.88	
2nd place, silver medalist(s)	Luis Lucumí	Colombia	69.62	74.74	x	71.12	72.64	68.78	74.74	
3rd place, bronze medalist(s)	Julián Sotelo	Spain	x	67.06	x	x	70.50	x	70.50	
4	Carlos Cunha	Portugal	65.74	64.52	70.46	66.00	66.24	63.38	70.46	
5	Juan de la Garza	Mexico	67.30	66.60	68.10	x	67.04	68.72	68.72	
6	Rodrigo Zelaya	Chile	65.16	x	66.90	–	63.22	66.48	66.90	
7	Edgar Baumann	Paraguay	66.70	x	60.74	59.54	x	57.50	66.70	
8	Martín Castillo	Mexico	64.36	65.66	63.40	62.20	64.24	61.74	65.66	
9	Nery Kennedy	Paraguay	58.54	x	64.28				64.28	
10	Gustavo Wielandt	Chile	63.88	62.30	62.00				63.88	
11	Carlos Pérez	Spain	62.62	x	63.02				63.02	
12	Ivan da Costa	Brazil	61.94	60.96	62.46				62.46	
13	Fernando Gubineli	Argentina	60.80	60.78	61.52				61.52	
14	Rigoberto Calderón	Nicaragua	56.14	61.08	59.20				61.08	

=== Decathlon ===
Final – 17–18 July

The highest mark recorded in each event is highlighted in yellow

Rank	Name	Nationality	100m	LJ	SP	HJ	400m	110m H	DT	PV	JT	1500m	Points	Notes
1st place, gold medalist(s)	Xavier Brunet	Spain	11.18	7.03 (+0.0)	11.80	2.14	48.13	14.72 (+0.8)	34.76	4.40	54.90	4:34.85	7.621	
2nd place, silver medalist(s)	José Ricardo Nunes	Brazil	11.22	7.07 (+0.3)	12.32	1.99	49.39	14.88 (+0.8)	38.82	4.00	58.54	4:31.23	7.480	
3rd place, bronze medalist(s)	Fernando Benet	Spain	11.22	7.28 (+0.5)	12.32	1.84	49.45	14.78 (+0.8)	33.40	4.40	52.52	4:34.69	7.299	
	Francisco Aledo	Spain	11.60	6.68 (+1.2)	13.22	1.84	51.53	15.69^{‡} (+0.8)	38.64	4.20	54.38	4:32.69	7.017^{‡}	Guest
4	Jorge Camacho	Mexico	11.28	6.83 (+1.2)	10.92	1.81	50.93	15.61^{‡} (+0.8)	35.38	4.60	41.48	4:32.50	6.852^{‡}	
5	Rubén Herrada	Venezuela	11.34	6.84 (+1.8)	12.35	1.81	50.58	16.50 (+0.8)	38.14	4.00	45.34	4:34.18	6.772	
	Paúl Buscail	Spain	11.48	6.86 (+1.3)	12.22	1.90	52.44	15.37 (+0.8)	36.36	4.30			DNF	Guest
	Carlos Cordente	Spain	11.26	6.99 (+0.7)	13.12	1.93	49.86	15.61 (+0.8)	39.24				DNF	Guest
	Oscar Veit	Argentina	11.49	7.24 (+0.7)	13.10	1.90	53.32						DNF	
	Heinz Falter	Chile											DNS	
	Giovanni Gudiño	Ecuador											DNS	
	Dean Torres	Ecuador											DNS	
	Francisco Flores	Honduras											DNS	

^{‡}: It is reported that the 110m hurdles results of Francisco Aledo and Jorge Camacho might have been switched on the final list, because Camacho appears with 15.69 and Aledo with 15.61 on an intermediate result list. In this case, Camacho would have achieved 6.843 pts and Aledo 7.026 pts.

=== 20 kilometers walk ===
Final – 18 July

Rank	Name	Nationality	Time	Notes
1st place, gold medalist(s)	Alberto Cruz	Mexico	1:25:35.9	
2nd place, silver medalist(s)	Clodomiro Moreno	Colombia	1:25:41.2	
3rd place, bronze medalist(s)	Jefferson Pérez	Ecuador	1:25:50.5	
4	Querubín Moreno	Colombia	1:26:00.4	
5	Fernando Vázquez	Spain	1:27:37.9	
6	Sérgio Galdino	Brazil	1:28:08.8	
7	Basilio Labrador	Spain	1:28:26.7	
8	Juan Sánchez	Mexico	1:30:29.2	
9	Julio Urias	Guatemala	1:31:59.2	
10	Jorge Loréfice	Argentina	1:33:59.5	
11	Rafael Valladares	Honduras	1:40:57.0	
	Marcelo Palma	Brazil	DQ	
	Benjamín Loréfice	Argentina	DQ	

=== 4x100 meters relay ===
Heat 1 – 18 July

Rank	Nation	Competitors	Time	Notes
1	Spain		40.00	Q
2	Brazil		40.25	Q
3	Puerto Rico		41.33	Q
4	Argentina		41.67	q
5	Bolivia	Alfredo Peredo; Rubén Gutiérrez; Vladimir Aponte; Marco Ortiz	42.82	

Heat 2 – 18 July

Rank	Nation	Competitors	Time	Notes
1	Cuba		39.13	Q
2	Mexico		39.88	Q
3	Colombia		40.04	Q
4	Dominican Republic		42.07	q
	Portugal		DNS	

Final – 19 July

Rank	Nation	Competitors	Time	Notes
1st place, gold medalist(s)	Cuba	Andrés Simón; Jorge Luis Aguilera; Joel Lamela; Joel Isasi	39.19	
2nd place, silver medalist(s)	Spain	José Javier Arqués; Enrique Talavera; Juan Jesús Trapero; Sergio López	39.44	
3rd place, bronze medalist(s)	Brazil	Fernando Botasso; André da Silva; Arnaldo da Silva; Robson da Silva	39.63	
4	Mexico	Herman Adam; Genaro Rojas; Manuel Cárdenas; Eduardo Nava	40.29	
5	Colombia	Robinson Urrutia; Wilson Cañizales; Jhon Jairo Mena; Wenceslao Ferrín	40.50	
6	Argentina	José María Beduino; Claudio Arcas; Guillermo Cacián; Carlos Gats	41.46	
7	Dominican Republic	Gerardo Suero; Carlos García; Lizandro Cruceta; Manuel Gonnell	42.06	
	Puerto Rico	Michael Francis; Domingo Cordero; Miguel Soto; Elmer Williams	DQ	

=== 4x400 meters relay ===
Final B – 19 July

Rank	Nation	Competitors	Time	Notes
1	Argentina	José María Beduino; Luis Migueles; Guillermo Cacián; Claudio Arcas	3:15.00	
2	Bolivia	Alfredo Peredo; Rubén Gutiérrez; D. Gutiérrez; Marcelo Reyes	3:26.46	
	Dominican Republic		DNS	
	Panama		DNS	
	Costa Rica		DNS	

Final A – 19 July

Rank	Nation	Competitors	Time	Notes
1st place, gold medalist(s)	Cuba	Norberto Téllez; Jorge Valentín; Lázaro Martínez; Roberto Hernández	3:01.58	
2nd place, silver medalist(s)	Brazil	Sidnei de Souza; Eronilde de Araújo; Ediélson Tenorio; Inaldo Sena	3:03.50	
3rd place, bronze medalist(s)	Mexico	Juan Vallín; Josué Morales; Luis Karim Toledo; Raymundo Escalante	3:05.87	
4	Spain	Manuel Moreno; Ángel Heras; Luis Cumellas; Cayetano Cornet	3:06.20	
5	Portugal	Alberto Ferreira; Mario Reis; Paulo Curvelo; Pedro Curvelo	3:10.98	
6	Chile	Alejandro Krauss; Pablo Squella; Cristián Courbis; Carlos Morales	3:11.51	
7	Colombia	Diego Córdoba; Llimy Rivas; Wilson Cañizales; Wenceslao Ferrín	3:12.55	

== Women's results ==
=== 100 meters ===
Heat 1 – 17 July
Wind: -1.2 m/s

Rank	Name	Nationality	Time	Notes
1	Norfalia Carabalí	Colombia	11.73	Q
2	Miriam Ferrer	Cuba	11.85	Q
3	Virginia Gomes	Portugal	12.01	Q
4	Denise Sharpe	Argentina	12.10	q
5	Margarita Martirena	Uruguay	12.10	q
6	Cristina Martín	Spain	12.15	
7	Natalia Moura	Portugal	12.27	Guest
8	Daisy Zereceda	Peru	12.91	

Heat 2 – 17 July
Wind: -1.8 m/s

Rank	Name	Nationality	Time	Notes
1	Liliana Allen	Cuba	11.68	Q
2	Claudete Alves Pina	Brazil	11.72	Q
3	Yolanda Díaz	Spain	12.00	Q
4	Marcela Tiscornia	Uruguay	12.26	
5	Cristina Regalo	Portugal	12.51	
6	Gilda Massa	Peru	12.62	
7	Ana María Luzio	Bolivia	12.66	
8	Natalia Toledo	Paraguay	12.68	

Final – 18 July
Wind: -0.8 m/s

Rank	Name	Nationality	Time	Notes
1st place, gold medalist(s)	Liliana Allen	Cuba	11.39	
2nd place, silver medalist(s)	Norfalia Carabalí	Colombia	11.72	
3rd place, bronze medalist(s)	Claudete Alves Pina	Brazil	11.76	
4	Miriam Ferrer	Cuba	11.98	
5	Virginia Gomes	Portugal	12.04	
6	Yolanda Díaz	Spain	12.15	
7	Margarita Martirena	Uruguay	12.17	
8	Denise Sharpe	Argentina	12.22	

=== 200 meters ===
Heat 1 – 18 July
Wind: +0.2 m/s

Rank	Name	Nationality	Time	Notes
1	Idalmis Bonne	Cuba	23.89	Q
2	Claudete Alves Pina	Brazil	23.98	Q
3	Mónica Casanovas	Spain	24.53	q
4	Alexandra Pina	Portugal	24.76	
5	Denise Sharpe	Argentina	24.83	
6	Jacqueline Soliz	Bolivia	25.65	

Heat 2 – 18 July
Wind: +0.2 m/s

Rank	Name	Nationality	Time	Notes
1	Cristina Castro	Spain	23.95	Q
2	Eusebia Riquelme	Cuba	24.31	Q
3	Claudia Acerenza	Uruguay	24.70	
4	Natalia Moura	Portugal	24.93	Guest
5	Marcela Tiscornia	Uruguay	24.94	
6	Moré Galetovic	Bolivia	26.10	

Heat 3 – 18 July
Wind: +1.1 m/s

Rank	Name	Nationality	Time	Notes
1	Norfalia Carabalí	Colombia	23.48	Q
2	María del Milagro Allende	Argentina	24.07	Q
3	Cristina Regalo	Portugal	24.10	q
4	Margarita Martirena	Uruguay	24.82	
5	Estela Gutiérrez	Dominican Republic	26.69	

Final – 18 July
Wind: -2.9 m/s

Rank	Name	Nationality	Time	Notes
1st place, gold medalist(s)	Norfalia Carabalí	Colombia	23.97	
2nd place, silver medalist(s)	Idalmis Bonne	Cuba	24.01	
3rd place, bronze medalist(s)	Claudete Alves Pina	Brazil	24.37	
4	Cristina Castro	Spain	24.38	
5	Eusebia Riquelme	Cuba	24.62	
6	Cristina Regalo	Portugal	24.93	
7	Mónica Casanovas	Spain	25.35	
	María del Milagro Allende	Argentina	DNF	

=== 400 meters ===
Heat 1 – 17 July

Rank	Name	Nationality	Time	Notes
1	Julia Duporty	Cuba	52.75	Q
2	Mayra Mayberry	Puerto Rico	53.21	Q
3	María del Milagro Allende	Argentina	54.06	Q
4	Gregoria Ferrer	Spain	54.44	q
5	Luciana Mendes	Brazil	54.90	q
6	Soledad Acerenza	Uruguay	58.24	

Heat 2 – 17 July

Rank	Name	Nationality	Time	Notes
1	Ximena Restrepo	Colombia	52.29	Q
2	Cristina Pérez	Spain	53.66	Q
3	Esther Lahoz	Spain	54.21	Guest
4	Odalmis Limonta	Cuba	54.44	Q
5	Claudia Acerenza	Uruguay	56.25	
6	Jacqueline Soliz	Bolivia	57.88	
7	Moré Galetovic	Bolivia	59.65	
8	Estela Gutiérrez	Dominican Republic	1:00.59	

Final – 18 July

Rank	Name	Nationality	Time	Notes
1st place, gold medalist(s)	Ximena Restrepo	Colombia	51.66	
2nd place, silver medalist(s)	Mayra Mayberry	Puerto Rico	52.78	
3rd place, bronze medalist(s)	Odalmis Limonta	Cuba	53.30	
4	Cristina Pérez	Spain	53.73	
5	Julia Duporty	Cuba	53.80	
6	Gregoria Ferrer	Spain	54.62	
	María del Milagro Allende	Argentina	DNS	
	Luciana Mendes	Brazil	DNS	

=== 800 meters ===
Heat 1 – 18 July

Rank	Name	Nationality	Time	Notes
1	Daisy Ocasio	Puerto Rico	2:08.70	Q
2	Amaia Andrés	Spain	2:11.36	Q
3	Maria Magnólia Figueiredo	Brazil	2:12.80	Q
4	Irma Betancourt	Mexico	2:12.81	
5	Shirley Céspedes	Costa Rica	2:13.31	

Heat 2 – 18 July

Rank	Name	Nationality	Time	Notes
1	Ana Fidelia Quirot	Cuba	2:08.69	Q
2	Elsa Amaral	Portugal	2:08.96	Q
3	Luciana Mendes	Brazil	2:09.12	Q
4	Eduarda Coelho	Portugal	2:09.38	q
5	Inés Justet	Uruguay	2:09.68	q
6	Dolores Rodríguez	Spain	2:10.17	

Final – 19 July

Rank	Name	Nationality	Time	Notes
1st place, gold medalist(s)	Ana Fidelia Quirot	Cuba	2:01.96	
2nd place, silver medalist(s)	Maria Magnólia Figueiredo	Brazil	2:02.45	
3rd place, bronze medalist(s)	Elsa Amaral	Portugal	2:02.75	
4	Amaia Andrés	Spain	2:03.25	
5	Eduarda Coelho	Portugal	2:05.87	
6	Daisy Ocasio	Puerto Rico	2:06.75	
7	Luciana Mendes	Brazil	2:07.02	
8	Inés Justet	Uruguay	2:10.16	

=== 1500 meters ===
Final – 18 July

Rank	Name	Nationality	Time	Notes
1st place, gold medalist(s)	Soraya Telles	Brazil	4:18.03	
2nd place, silver medalist(s)	Estela Estévez	Spain	4:18.40	
3rd place, bronze medalist(s)	Norma Fernández	Argentina	4:18.78	
4	Mabel Arrúa	Argentina	4:22.04	
5	Janeth Caizalitín	Ecuador	4:22.70	
6	Ana Paula Mota	Portugal	4:24.66	
7	María Luisa Servín	Mexico	4:25.08	
8	Irma Torres	Mexico	4:27.00	
9	Shirley Céspedes	Costa Rica	4:35.81	
10	Olga Zepeda	Honduras	5:05.25	

=== 3000 meters ===
Final – 17 July

Rank	Name	Nationality	Time	Notes
1st place, gold medalist(s)	Carmem de Oliveira	Brazil	9:20.83	
2nd place, silver medalist(s)	Mabel Arrúa	Argentina	9:23.24	
3rd place, bronze medalist(s)	María Luisa Servín	Mexico	9:23.71	
4	Sonia Betancourt	Mexico	9:26.96	
5	Fátima Neves	Portugal	9:27.36	
6	Martha Tenorio	Ecuador	9:27.63	
7	Janeth Caizalitín	Ecuador	9:37.03	
8	Sandra Cortez	Bolivia	9:44.49	
9	Olga Zepeda	Honduras	10:48.46	

=== 10,000 meters ===
Final – 18 July

Rank	Name	Nationality	Time	Notes
1st place, gold medalist(s)	Carmem de Oliveira	Brazil	33:21.00	
2nd place, silver medalist(s)	Griselda González	Argentina	33:24.89	
3rd place, bronze medalist(s)	Martha Tenorio	Ecuador	33:29.69	
4	María del Carmen Díaz	Mexico	34:00.08	
5	Mónica Regonessi	Chile	34:06.62	
6	Stella Castro	Colombia	34:23.72	
7	Yolanda Quimbita	Ecuador	34:36.54	
8	Sandra Cortez	Bolivia	34:47.44	
9	Sonia Betancourt	Mexico	35:04.48	
10	Kriscia Lorena García	El Salvador	37:38.43	
	Rocío Rios	Spain	DNF	

=== 100 meters hurdles ===
Heat 1 – 17 July
Wind: -1.1 m/s

Rank	Name	Nationality	Time	Notes
1	Aliuska López	Cuba	13.23	Q
2	Joyce Meléndez	Puerto Rico	13.89	Q
3	Ana Barrenechea	Spain	13.90	Q
4	Lucy da Conceição	Brazil	14.28	q
5	Mónica Sousa	Portugal	14.93	

Heat 2 – 17 July
Wind: -1.6 m/s

Rank	Name	Nationality	Time	Notes
1	Odalys Adams	Cuba	13.26	Q
2	María José Mardomingo	Spain	13.50	Q
3	Carmen Bezanilla	Chile	14.07	Q
4	Anabella von Kesselstatt	Argentina	14.32	q
5	Gilda Massa	Peru	15.17	

Final – 17 July
Wind: -1.1 m/s

Rank	Name	Nationality	Time	Notes
1st place, gold medalist(s)	Aliuska López	Cuba	13.13	
2nd place, silver medalist(s)	Odalys Adams	Cuba	13.15	
3rd place, bronze medalist(s)	María José Mardomingo	Spain	13.71	
4	Ana Barrenechea	Spain	13.95	
5	Carmen Bezanilla	Chile	14.25	
6	Joyce Meléndez	Puerto Rico	14.47	
7	Anabella von Kesselstatt	Argentina	14.55	
8	Lucy da Conceição	Brazil	14.74	

=== 400 meters hurdles ===
Heat 1 – 18 July

Rank	Name	Nationality	Time	Notes
1	Miriam Alonso	Spain	58.84	Q
2	Anabella von Kesselstatt	Argentina	59.04	Q
3	Maribelcy Peña	Colombia	59.59	Q
4	Alejandra Quintanar	Mexico	1:00.73	q
5	Mónica Sousa	Portugal	1:01.34	q
6	Larissa Soto	Guatemala	1:03.48	

Heat 2 – 18 July

Rank	Name	Nationality	Time	Notes
1	Lency Montelier	Cuba	58.77	Q
2	Jupira da Graça	Brazil	58.86	Q
3	Yolanda Dolz	Spain	59.63	Q
4	Liliana Chalá	Ecuador	1:01.80	
5	Magdalena Molina	Costa Rica	1:04.55	

Final – 19 July

Rank	Name	Nationality	Time	Notes
1st place, gold medalist(s)	Lency Montelier	Cuba	56.79	
2nd place, silver medalist(s)	Miriam Alonso	Spain	57.01	
3rd place, bronze medalist(s)	Jupira da Graça	Brazil	58.32	
4	Anabella von Kesselstatt	Argentina	58.57	
5	Maribelcy Peña	Colombia	59.67	
6	Alejandra Quintanar	Mexico	59.80	
7	Yolanda Dolz	Spain	59.99	
8	Mónica Sousa	Portugal	1:03.88	

=== High jump ===
Final – 18 July

Rank	Name	Nationality	Attempts											Result	Notes
Rank	Name	Nationality	1.70	1.75	1.79	1.82	1.85	1.87	1.89	1.93	1.95	1.98	2.00	Result	Notes
1st place, gold medalist(s)	Ioamnet Quintero	Cuba	–	o	–	o	o	–	o	xo	o	xxo	xxx	1.98	
2nd place, silver medalist(s)	Silvia Costa	Cuba	–	–	–	o	o	–	o	xo	xxx			1.93	
3rd place, bronze medalist(s)	Cristina Fink	Mexico	–	–	o	–	xo	o	xxx					1.87	
4	Mónica Lunkmoss	Brazil	–	o	o	o	xo	xxx						1.85	
5	Mari Mar Martínez	Spain	o	xo	o	xxx								1.79	
6	Belén Saez	Spain	o	xo	xo	xxx								1.79	

=== Long jump ===
Final – 18 July

Rank	Name	Nationality	Attempts						Result	Notes
Rank	Name	Nationality	1	2	3	4	5	6	Result	Notes
1st place, gold medalist(s)	Niurka Montalvo	Cuba	x	6.30 (+0.8)	6.51 w (+2.2)	6.35 (+1.1)	6.40 (−0.4)	6.48 (+0.7)	6.51 w (+2.2 m/s)	
2nd place, silver medalist(s)	Luisa López	Spain		6.22 (+0.5)	6.37 (+1.8)	6.10 (−0.8)	x	x	6.37 (+1.8 m/s)	
3rd place, bronze medalist(s)	María Jesús Martín	Spain	x	x	5.84 (+1.7)	5.83 (+1.0)	5.89 (+0.0)	5.94 (+0.5)	5.94 (+0.5 m/s)	
4	Virginia Gomes	Portugal	x	5.63 (+0.8)	5.68 (+0.9)	5.58 (+0.6)	5.76 (−0.2)	5.91 (−0.4)	5.91 (−0.4 m/s)	
5	Natalia Toledo	Paraguay	x	5.68 (+1.0)	5.76 (+1.3)	5.70 (−0.8)	x	5.56 (+1.1)	5.76 (+1.3 m/s)	
6	Citlali Sainz	Mexico	5.49 (+0.2)	5.53 (+1.1)	5.57 (+1.7)	5.66 (−0.9)	5.46 (+0.0)	x	5.66 (−0.9 m/s)	
7	Ana María Luzio	Bolivia	5.47 (+0.5)	5.30 (+0.0)	5.47 (+2.0)	5.34 (+0.0)	5.40 (+0.0)	5.31 (+0.9)	5.47 (+0.5 m/s)	
	Daisy Zereceda	Peru	x	x	x				NM	
	Gilda Massa	Peru	x	x	x				NM	

=== Triple jump ===
Final – 17 July

Rank	Name	Nationality	Attempts						Result	Notes
Rank	Name	Nationality	1	2	3	4	5	6	Result	Notes
1st place, gold medalist(s)	Niurka Montalvo	Cuba	x	12.94 (+1.5)	x	12.92 (+1.7)	13.32 (+1.5)	13.60 (+1.1)	13.60 (+1.1 m/s)	
2nd place, silver medalist(s)	Rita Slompo	Brazil	x	x	12.78 (+0.9)	12.96 (+2.0)	–	–	12.96 (+2.0 m/s)	
3rd place, bronze medalist(s)	Andrea Ávila	Argentina	12.05 (+1.5)	12.82 (+1.0)	12.57 (+0.6)	x	12.42 (+1.1)	12.54 w (+2.3)	12.82 (+1.0 m/s)	
4	Sonia Rallo	Spain	12.67 (+1.3)	x	x	12.36 (+1.3)	12.66 (+1.4)	x	12.67 (+1.3 m/s)	
5	Citlali Sainz	Mexico	12.07 (+1.3)	12.28 (+1.2)	x	x	x	x	12.28 (+1.2 m/s)	

=== Shot put ===
Final – 19 July

Rank	Name	Nationality	Attempts						Result	Notes
Rank	Name	Nationality	1	2	3	4	5	6	Result	Notes
1st place, gold medalist(s)	Belsy Laza	Cuba	x	19.20	19.31	19.26	19.27	18.81	19.31	
2nd place, silver medalist(s)	Elisângela Adriano	Brazil	16.13	15.80	16.50	x	15.96	16.75	16.75	
3rd place, bronze medalist(s)	Margarita Ramos	Spain	16.43	16.69	x	16.47	x	x	16.69	
4	Ángeles Barreiro	Spain	13.88	14.44	14.49	x	x	x	14.49	
5	Verónica Monzón	Guatemala	11.23	11.15	11.05	11.48	11.37	11.46	11.48	
6	María Lourdes Ruiz	Nicaragua	10.30	10.90	11.16	10.81	10.99	x	11.16	

=== Discus throw ===
Final – 18 July

Rank	Name	Nationality	Attempts						Result	Notes
Rank	Name	Nationality	1	2	3	4	5	6	Result	Notes
	Maritza Martén	Cuba	–	70.68	–				70.68	Guest
1st place, gold medalist(s)	Hilda Elisa Ramos	Cuba	65.08	65.94	x	x	67.46	67.04	67.46	
2nd place, silver medalist(s)	Bárbara Hechevarría	Cuba	59.60	x	x	x	x	64.14	64.14	
3rd place, bronze medalist(s)	María Isabel Urrutia	Colombia	54.34	x	57.46	54.40	x	x	57.46	
4	Teresa Machado	Portugal					51.88	55.32	56.92	^{†}
5	Ángeles Barreiro	Spain	55.66	55.42	54.12	x	53.42	53.46	55.66	
6	Sonia Godall	Spain	x	x	53.78	x	x	53.44	53.78	
7	Liliana Martinelli	Argentina	46.16	48.38	49.34	51.10	x	46.80	51.10	
8	María Lourdes Ruiz	Nicaragua	44.60	41.98	42.36	40.98	41.42	x	44.60	
9	Elisângela Adriano	Brazil	x	x	43.54				43.54	
10	Sadith Fretes	Paraguay	43.02	x	x				43.02	
11	Verónica Monzón	Guatemala	32.84	32.38	x				32.94	

^{†}: Rest of the series not known.

=== Javelin throw ===
Final – 17 July

Rank	Name	Nationality	Attempts						Result	Notes
Rank	Name	Nationality	1	2	3	4	5	6	Result	Notes
1st place, gold medalist(s)	Dulce Margarita García	Cuba	52.42	56.76	54.58	57.26	55.44	57.38	57.38	
2nd place, silver medalist(s)	Isel López	Cuba	52.20	x	55.80	x	x	x	55.80	
3rd place, bronze medalist(s)	Carla Bispo	Brazil	x	x	x	x	53.40	x	53.40	
4	Marieta Riera	Venezuela	46.16	48.30	48.72	48.10	50.42	47.52	50.42	
5	Cristina Larrea	Spain	46.64	42.78	42.08	x	x	44.64	46.64	
6	Sonia Favre	Argentina	40.80	x	x	38.78	38.54		40.80	
7	Lucy Agüero	Paraguay	x	35.12	37.04	37.50	39.10	37.88	39.10	

=== Heptathlon ===
Final – 17–18 July

The highest mark recorded in each event is highlighted in yellow

Rank	Name	Nationality	100m H	HJ	SP	200m	LJ	JT	800m	Points	Notes
1st place, gold medalist(s)	Zorobabelia Córdoba	Colombia	14.11 (+0.0)	1.71	12.90	25.18 (−1.1)	5.56 (+2.0)	50.30	2:21.48	5.808	CR, NR
2nd place, silver medalist(s)	Ana María Comaschi	Argentina	13.74 (+0.0)	1.65	13.06	24.37 (−1.1)	5.62 (+0.6)	39.88	2:13.88	5.795	NR
3rd place, bronze medalist(s)	Ana Lúcia Silva	Brazil	15.34 (+0.0)	1.71	12.63	26.45 (−1.1)	5.76 (+0.4)	39.48	2:24.70	5.320	
4	Susana Cruz	Spain	14.28 (+0.0)	1.68	11.63	26.43 (−1.1)	5.64 (+1.2)	32.60	2:18.78	5.273	
5	Sonia Pérez	Spain	14.82 (+0.0)	1.68	11.20	26.78 (−1.1)	5.38 (+0.6)	42.86	2:19.41	5.253	
	Montserrat Fernández	Spain	15.11 (+0.0)	1.71	10.09	26.03 (−1.1)	5.71 (+1.7)	26.42	2:23.07	4.977	Guest
	Patricia Guevara	Spain	14.76 (+0.0)	1.62	11.31	26.32 (−1.1)	5.51 (+0.6)			DNF	Guest
	Nora Araújo	Portugal	16.22 (+0.0)	1.65	11.34					DNF	

=== 10,000 meters walk ===
Final – 17 July

Rank	Name	Nationality	Time	Notes
1st place, gold medalist(s)	Francisca Martínez	Mexico	47:51.95	
2nd place, silver medalist(s)	Olga Sánchez	Spain	48:08.86	
3rd place, bronze medalist(s)	Miriam Ramón	Ecuador	48:13.74	
4	Rosa Sierra	Spain	49:54.72	
5	Rosalia Sánchez	Mexico	52:33.51	
6	Rosemar Piazza	Brazil	52:50.27	
7	María Magdalena Guzmán	El Salvador	52:50.82	
8	Doris Vallecillo	Honduras	57:39.17	

=== 4x100 meters relay ===
Final – 19 July

Rank	Nation	Competitors	Time	Notes
1st place, gold medalist(s)	Cuba	Miriam Ferrer; Eusebia Riquelme; Idalmis Bonne; Liliana Allen	44.49	
2nd place, silver medalist(s)	Spain	María Paz Minicozzi; Cristina Castro; Yolanda Díaz; Cristina Martín	45.53	
3rd place, bronze medalist(s)	Colombia	Zorobabelia Córdoba; Ximena Restrepo; Maribelcy Peña; Norfalia Carabalí	45.54	
4	Portugal	Alexandra Pina; Cristina Regalo; Natalia Moura; Virginia Gomes	46.09	
5	Uruguay	Marcela Tiscornia; Soledad Acerenza; Claudia Acerenza; Margarita Martirena	46.51	
6	Bolivia	Moré Galetovic; Ana María Luzio; Jacqueline Soliz; Sandra Antelo	48.56	

=== 4x400 meters relay ===
Final – 19 July

Rank	Nation	Competitors	Time	Notes
1st place, gold medalist(s)	Cuba	Julia Duporty; Odalmis Limonta; Lency Montelier; Ana Fidelia Quirot	3:33.43	
2nd place, silver medalist(s)	Spain	Gregoria Ferrer; Esther Lahoz; Blanca Lacambra; Cristina Pérez	3:34.22	
3rd place, bronze medalist(s)	Uruguay	Marcela Tiscornia; Soledad Acerenza; Inés Justet; Claudia Acerenza	3:46.73	
4	Bolivia	Moré Galetovic; Sandra Antelo; Amparo Burgos; Jacqueline Soliz	3:55.46	
