= Athletics at the 1991 Pan American Games – Men's 4 × 100 metres relay =

Men's 4 × 100 metres relay at the Pan American Games

The men's 4 × 100 metres relay event at the 1991 Pan American Games was held in Havana, Cuba on 11 August.

== Results ==
Rank	Nation	Athletes	Time	Notes
1st place, gold medalist(s)	Cuba	Jorge Aguilera, Leandro Peñalver, Félix Stevens, Joel Lamela	39.08	
2nd place, silver medalist(s)	Canada	Everton Anderson, Mike Dwyer, Peter Ogilvie, Donovan Bailey	39.95	
3rd place, bronze medalist(s)	United States Virgin Islands	Derry Pemberton, Neville Hodge, Keith Smith, Kevin Robinson	41.02	
4	Saint Vincent and the Grenadines	Eversley Linley, Eswort Coombs, Dexter Browne, Kent Dennie	42.04	
5	Belize	Lindford Castillo, Michael Joseph, Carlton Usher, John Palacio	43.82	
	United States	Andre Cason, Jon Drummond, Michael Bates, Jeff Williams	DNF	
	Jamaica	John Mair, Michael Green, Dennis Mowatt, Clive Wright	DNF	
