= Athletics at the 1993 Central American and Caribbean Games =

Athletics at the XVII CAC Games
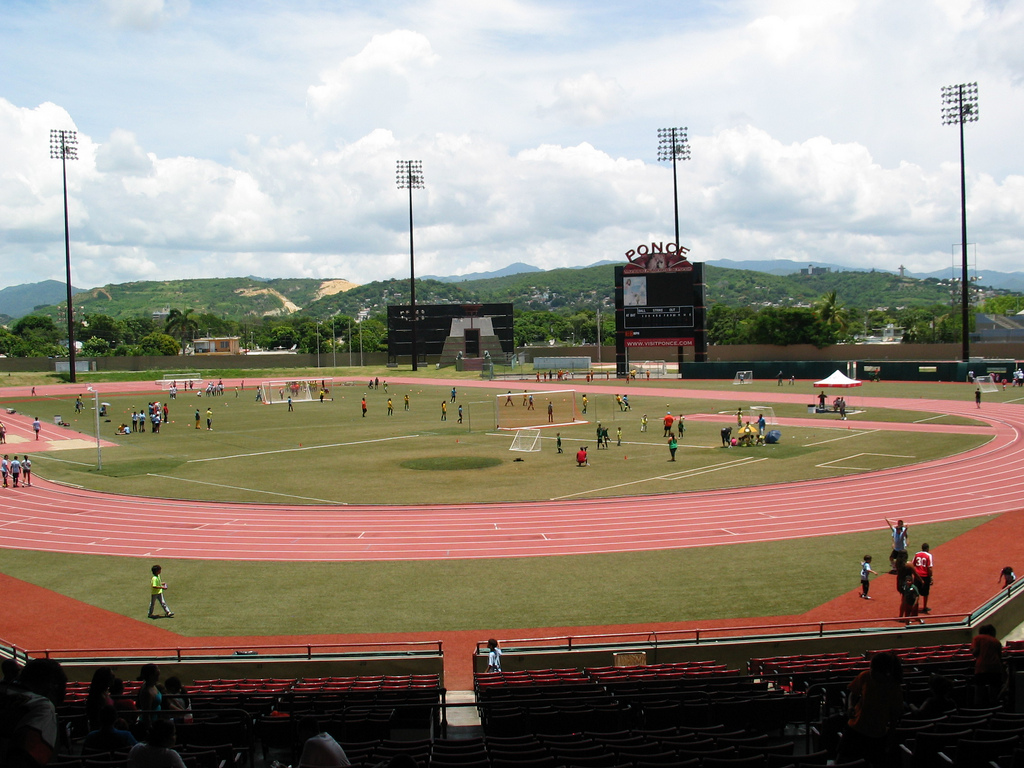
- Host stadium in Ponce.
- Dates: 23–28 November
- Host city: Ponce, Puerto Rico
- Venue: Estadio Francisco Montaner
- Events: 43
- Participation: 287 athletes from 30 nations

The track and field competition at the 1993 Central American and Caribbean Games was held in November at the Estadio Francisco Montaner in Ponce, Puerto Rico.

== Medal summary ==
=== Men's events ===
Event	Gold		Silver		Bronze	
100 metres (wind: -1.7 m/s)	Joel Isasi; Cuba	10.38	Andrés Simón; Cuba	10.49	Patrick Delice; Trinidad and Tobago	10.62
200 metres (wind: +1.3 m/s)	Andrew Tynes; Bahamas	20.64	Iván García; Cuba	20.71	Jorge Aguilera; Cuba	20.91
400 metres	Norberto Téllez; Cuba	45.80	Neil de Silva; Trinidad and Tobago	46.07	Omar Mena; Cuba	46.32
800 metres	Javier Soto; Puerto Rico	1:49.40	Héctor Herrera; Cuba	1:49.99	Dale Jones; Antigua and Barbuda	1:50.05
1500 metres	José López; Venezuela	3:43.89	Desmond Hector; Guyana	3:46.08	Arturo Espejel; Mexico	3:46.74
5000 metres	Isaac García; Mexico	13:57.84	Gabino Apolonio; Mexico	14:06.43	Orlando Ceballos; Puerto Rico	14:31.08
10,000 metres	Dionicio Cerón; Mexico	28:58.11	Isaac García; Mexico	29:33.74	Orlando Ceballos; Puerto Rico	30:11.60
Marathon	Benjamín Paredes; Mexico	02:14:23	Julio Hernández; Colombia	02:17:21	Samuel López; Mexico	02:17:38
110 metres hurdles (wind: -1.7 m/s)	Emilio Valle; Cuba	13.87	Wagner Marseille; Haiti	14.10	Alexis Sánchez; Cuba	14.14
400 metres hurdles	Domingo Cordero; Puerto Rico	49.60 GR	Pedro Piñera; Cuba	50.12	Juan Gutiérrez; Mexico	50.47
3000 metre steeplechase	Rubén García; Mexico	8:38.43 GR	Héctor Arias; Mexico	8:40.19	Juan Ramón Conde; Cuba	8:45.62
4 × 100 metres relay	Cuba; Andrés Simón; Iván García; Joel Isasi; Jorge Aguilera	39.24	Puerto Rico; Carlos Santos; Domingo Cordero; Edgardo Guilbe; Agner Muñoz	40.01	Colombia; Wenceslao Ferrín; Wilson Cañizales; Luis Alfonso Vega; John Mena	40.09
4 × 400 metres relay	Cuba; Omar Mena; Héctor Herrera; Lázaro Martínez; Norberto Téllez	3:05.62	Trinidad and Tobago; Patrick Delice; Neil de Silva; Dazel Jules; Ian Morris	3:06.96	Jamaica; Michael Anderson; Carl McPherson; Danny McFarlane; Evon Clarke	3:07.23
20 kilometre road walk	Daniel García; Mexico	1:26:22	Héctor Moreno; Colombia	1:26:32	Julio Martínez; Guatemala	1:29:43
50 kilometre road walk	Edel Oliva; Cuba	3:55:21	Germán Sánchez; Mexico	3:56:18	Julio César Urías; Guatemala	4:03:24
High jump	Javier Sotomayor; Cuba	2.35 GR	Marino Drake; Cuba	2.20	Antonio Burgos; Puerto Rico	2.14
Pole vault	Edgar Díaz; Puerto Rico	5.30	Alberto Manzano; Cuba	5.30	Only two athletes with a mark	
Long jump	Wendell Williams; Trinidad and Tobago	7.95	Michael Francis; Puerto Rico	7.92	Jaime Jefferson; Cuba	7.85
Triple jump	Yoelbi Quesada; Cuba	17.06 GR	Daniel Osorio; Cuba	16.52	Sergio Saavedra; Venezuela	16.30
Shot put	Jorge Montenegro; Cuba	18.88	Carlos Fandiño; Cuba	18.68	Yojer Medina; Venezuela	17.96
Discus throw	Alexis Elizalde; Cuba	61.24	Luis Delís; Cuba	59.32	Yojer Medina; Venezuela	54.94
Hammer throw	Alberto Sánchez; Cuba	72.20 GR	Eladio Hernández; Cuba	69.58	Guillermo Guzmán; Mexico	65.52
Javelin throw	Luis Lucumí; Colombia	74.58	Ovidio Trimiño; Cuba	73.08	Emeterio González; Cuba	71.24
Decathlon	Eugenio Balanqué; Cuba	7889 GR	Raúl Duany; Cuba	7715	José Román; Puerto Rico	7262

=== Women's events ===
Event	Gold		Silver		Bronze	
100 metres (wind: -1.7 m/s)	Liliana Allen; Cuba	11.52	Miriam Ferrer; Cuba	11.81	Chandra Sturrup; Bahamas	11.89
200 metres (wind: +1.6 m/s)	Liliana Allen; Cuba	23.14	Idalmis Bonne; Cuba	23.53	Ximena Restrepo; Colombia	23.88
400 metres	Julia Duporty; Cuba	51.81	Zoila Stewart; Costa Rica	52.57 (NR)	Nancy McLeón; Cuba	52.59
800 metres	Letitia Vriesde; Suriname	2:04.28	Ana Fidelia Quirot; Cuba	2:05.22	Daisy Ocasio; Puerto Rico	2:06.52
1500 metres	Letitia Vriesde; Suriname	4:18.45	Isabel Juárez; Mexico	4:20.20	Susana Díaz; Mexico	4:21.45
3000 metres	Isabel Juárez; Mexico	9:16.27 GR	Adriana Fernández; Mexico	9:18.93	Milagro Rodríguez; Cuba	9:22.36
10,000 metres	María del Carmen Díaz; Mexico	34:49.67	Lucía Rendón; Mexico	35:13.30	Carmen Serrano; Puerto Rico	36:19.66
Marathon	Emma Cabrera; Mexico	2:42:29 GR	María Elena Reyna; Mexico	2:43:39	Emperatriz Wilson; Cuba	2:54:41
100 metres hurdles (wind: -2.1 m/s)	Aliuska López; Cuba	13.46	Oraidis Ramírez; Cuba	13.49	Joyce Meléndez; Puerto Rico	14.22
400 metres hurdles	Lency Montelier; Cuba	57.61	Maribelsy Peña; Colombia	58.68	Wynsome Cole; Jamaica	60.23
4 × 100 metres relay	Cuba; Miriam Ferrer; Aliuska López; Julia Duporty; Liliana Allen	44.59	Colombia; Elia Mera; Ximena Restrepo; Patricia Rodríguez; Norfalia Carabalí	44.62	Jamaica; Cheryl Phillips; Kerry-Ann Richards; Shelly Berth; Nikole Mitchell	45.75
4 × 400 metres relay	Cuba; Idalmis Bonne; Julia Duporty; Lency Montelier; Nancy McLeón	3:31.27	Colombia; Patricia Rodríguez; Maribelcy Peña; Elia Mera; Norfalia Carabalí	3:36.82	Jamaica; Wynsome Cole; Shelly Berth; Tanya Jarret; Claudine Williams	3:37.72
10,000 metre track walk	María Colín; Mexico	47:57.20	Liliana Bermeo; Colombia	49:21.18	Magdalena Guzmán; El Salvador	53:16.81
Long jump	Niurka Montalvo; Cuba	6.37	Eloína Echevarría; Cuba	5.91w	Suzette Lee; Jamaica	5.53
Triple jump	Niurka Montalvo; Cuba	13.57 GR	Eloína Echevarría; Cuba	13.02	Suzette Lee; Jamaica	12.40
Shot put	Herminia Fernández; Cuba	18.00	Yumileidi Cumbá; Cuba	17.67	Laverne Eve; Bahamas	15.35
Discus throw	Bárbara Hechevarría; Cuba	61.02	Maritza Martén; Cuba	59.44	María Isabel Urrutia; Colombia	53.12
Javelin throw	Isel López; Cuba	61.48	Xiomara Rivero; Cuba	57.02	Patricia Alonso; Venezuela	50.38
Heptathlon	Magalys García; Cuba	5903 GR	Regla Cárdenas; Cuba	5838	Zorobabelia Córdoba; Colombia	5326

== Medal table ==
Rank	Nation	Gold	Silver	Bronze	Total
1	Cuba	31	29	12	72
2	Mexico	9	8	5	22
3	Puerto Rico (PUR)	4	3	9	16
4	Colombia	2	5	6	13
5	Venezuela (VEN)	2	0	5	7
6	Suriname	2	0	0	2
7	Trinidad and Tobago	1	2	1	4
8	Bahamas	1	0	2	3
9	Jamaica	0	1	7	8
10	Bermuda	0	1	0	1
10	Costa Rica	0	1	0	1
10	Guyana	0	1	0	1
10	Haiti	0	1	0	1
14	Guatemala	0	0	2	2
15	El Salvador	0	0	1	1
15	Netherlands Antilles	0	0	1	1
Totals (16 entries)		52	52	51	155

== Participation ==
- Antigua and Barbuda (3)
- Aruba (1)
- Bahamas (7)
- Barbados (2)
- Belize (2)
- Bermuda (2)
- British Virgin Islands (1)
- Cayman Islands (2)
- Colombia (20)
- Costa Rica (2)
- Cuba (60)
- Dominican Republic (3)
- Grenada (7)
- Guatemala (11)
- Guyana (2)
- Haiti (5)
- Jamaica (21)
- Mexico (30)
- Netherlands Antilles (4)
- Nicaragua (4)
- Panama (2)
- Puerto Rico (44)
- Saint Kitts and Nevis (9)
- Saint Lucia (4)
- Saint Vincent and the Grenadines (1)
- El Salvador (4)
- Suriname (2)
- Trinidad and Tobago (11)
- United States Virgin Islands (14)
- Venezuela (7)

== See also ==
- 1993 in athletics (track and field)
