= Isaac García =

Mexican long-distance runner

Isaac García (born April 5, 1968) is a retired male long-distance runner from Mexico, who specialized in the marathon. He set his personal best (2:10:54) in the classic distance on April 25, 1995, when he got the third place in Rotterdam.

He represented Mexico in the marathon at the 2001 World Championships in Athletics and he finished in 55th place. He was more successful at regional level: he began with a 10,000 metres silver medal at the 1990 Central American and Caribbean Games and followed it up with another silver at the 1991 CAC Championships. The 1993 Central American and Caribbean Games proved to be the highlight of his career, as he won the 5000 metres gold medal for Mexico, as well as retaining the 10,000 m silver.

== Achievements ==
Year	Competition	Venue	Position	Event	Notes
Representing Mexico
1990	Central American and Caribbean Games	Mexico City, Mexico	2nd	10,000 m	30:05.63
1991	Central American and Caribbean Championships	Xalapa, Mexico	2nd	10,000 m	29:52.59
1992	Ibero-American Championships	Seville, Spain	8th	5000m	14:11.48
1993	Central American and Caribbean Games	Ponce, Puerto Rico	1st	5000 m	13:57.84
1993	Central American and Caribbean Games	Ponce, Puerto Rico	2nd	10,000 m	29:33.74
1998	Central American and Caribbean Games	Maracaibo, Venezuela	4th	5000 m	14:07.59
2000	Ibero-American Championships	Rio de Janeiro, Brazil	3rd	10,000 m	28:59.68
2001	World Championships	Edmonton, Canada	55th	Marathon	2:33:32
