= Edel Oliva =

Cuban racewalker (born 1965)

Personal information
- Born: February 12, 1965 (age 61)

Sport
- Sport: Track and field
Medal record
Representing Cuba
Pan American Games
Bronze medal – third place	1991 Havana	50km
Central American and Caribbean Games
Gold medal – first place	1993 Ponce	50km
Silver medal – second place	1990 Mexico City	50km

Edel Oliva Dávila (born February 12, 1965) is a retired male race walker from Cuba. He set his personal best in the men's 50 km event (3:52:19) on March 24, 1995, during the 1995 Pan American Games in Mar del Plata, Argentina. He was a bronze medallist at the competition and also won a gold medal at the 1993 Central American and Caribbean Games.

== International competitions ==
Year	Competition	Venue	Position	Event	Notes
Representing Cuba
1985	Central American and Caribbean Championships	Nassau, Bahamas	3rd	50 km	4:40:37
1986	Central American and Caribbean Games	Santiago, Dominican Republic	–	50 km	DNF
1986	Ibero-American Championships	Havana, Cuba	3rd	20 km	1:40:13
1987	World Race Walking Cup	New York City, United States	40th	50 km	4:14:19
1989	World Race Walking Cup	L'Hospitalet, Spain	43rd	20 km	1:27:05
1990	Central American and Caribbean Games	Mexico City, Mexico	2nd	50 km	4:10:19 A
1991	Pan American Games	Havana, Cuba	3rd	50 km	4:16:27
1993	World Race Walking Cup	Monterrey, Mexico	—	50 km	DNF
1993	Central American and Caribbean Games	Ponce, Puerto Rico	1st	50 km	3:55:21
