= Rubén García (athlete) =

Personal information
- Full name: Rubén García Gómez
- Born: 29 December 1970 (age 55)
- Height: 1.69 m (5 ft 7 in)
- Weight: 53 kg (117 lb)

Sport
- Sport: Athletics
- Event: 3000 m steeplechase
Medal record
Representing Mexico
Central American and Caribbean Games
Gold medal – first place	1993 Ponce	3000m steeplechase

Rubén García Gómez (born 29 December 1970) is a retired Mexican who specialised in the 3000 metres steeplechase. He won several medals at regional level.

== International competitions ==
Year	Competition	Venue	Position	Event	Notes
Representing Mexico
1989	Pan American Junior Championships	Santa Fe, Argentina	4th	3000 m s'chase	9:04.86
1991	Central American and Caribbean Championships	Xalapa, Mexico	2nd	5000 m	14:27.93
1992	Ibero-American Championships	Seville, Spain	8th	3000 m s'chase	9:02.34
1993	Central American and Caribbean Games	Ponce, Puerto Rico	1st	3000 m s'chase	8:38.43
1994	Ibero-American Championships	Mar del Plata, Argentina	2nd	3000 m s'chase	8:36.81
1995	Pan American Games	Mar del Plata, Argentina	5th	3000 m s'chase	8:41.90
1995	Central American and Caribbean Championships	Guatemala City, Guatemala	1st	3000 m s'chase	8:52.91
1996	Ibero-American Championships	Medellín, Colombia	5th	3000 m s'chase	9:11.20
1999	Central American and Caribbean Championships	Bridgetown, Barbados	3rd	3000 m s'chase	8:47.33

== Personal bests ==
Outdoor

- 3000 metres – 8:07.47 (Richmond 1999)
- 5000 metres – 13:39.10 (Hengelo 1994)
- Marathon – 2:16:51 (Torreón 2004)
- 3000 metres steeplechase – 8:31.68 (Pontevedra 1995)
