= Miriam Ferrer =

Cuban sprinter (born 1963)

Personal information
- Born: 18 June 1963 (age 63) Havana, Cuba

Sport
- Sport: Athletics
- Event: 100 metres
Medal record
Representing Cuba
Pan American Games
Silver medal – second place	1995 Mar del Plata	4x100m relay
Central American and Caribbean Games
Gold medal – first place	1993 Ponce	4x100m relay
Silver medal – second place	1993 Ponce	100m

Miriam Ferrer (born 18 June 1963) is a retired Cuban sprinter. She represented her country at the 1993 World Championships reaching the quarterfinals. At the same championships she was part of the 4 × 100 metres relay team that set the still standing Cuban record.

Her personal best in the event is 11.15 set in Mexico City in 1992.

== International competitions ==
Year	Competition	Venue	Position	Event	Notes
Representing Cuba
1978	Central American and Caribbean; Junior Championships (U17)	Xalapa, Mexico	5th	200 m	12.56
1978	Central American and Caribbean; Junior Championships (U17)	Xalapa, Mexico	2nd	4 × 100 m relay	49.25
1990	Goodwill Games	Seattle, United States	8th	200 m	26.06
1990	Goodwill Games	Seattle, United States	4th	4 × 100 m relay	44.35
1992	Ibero-American Championships	Seville, Spain	4th	100 m	11.98
1992	Ibero-American Championships	Seville, Spain	1st	4 × 100 m relay	44.49
1993	Central American and Caribbean Championships	Cali, Colombia	1st	100 m	11.42 (w)
1993	Central American and Caribbean Championships	Cali, Colombia	3rd	4 × 100 m relay	44.64
1993	World Championships	Stuttgart, Germany	22nd (qf)	100 m	11.43
1993	World Championships	Stuttgart, Germany	6th	4 × 100 m relay	42.89
1993	Central American and Caribbean Games	Ponce, Puerto Rico	2nd	100 m	11.81
1993	Central American and Caribbean Games	Ponce, Puerto Rico	1st	4 × 100 m relay	44.59
1994	Goodwill Games	St. Petersburg, Russia	2nd	4 × 100 m relay	43.37
1995	Pan American Games	Mar del Plata, Argentina	2nd	4 × 100 m relay	44.08
1995	Central American and Caribbean Championships	Guatemala City, Guatemala	1st	4 × 100 m relay	44.41
