= Michael Francis (athlete) =

Puerto Rican long jumper

Personal information
- Born: 29 October 1970 (age 55)

Sport
- Sport: Track and field
Medal record
Representing Puerto Rico
Central American and Caribbean Games
Silver medal – second place	1993 Ponce	Long jump

Michael Francis Aponte (born 29 October 1970) is a Puerto Rican retired long jumper. His personal best jump was 8.18 metres, achieved in May 1995 in Raleigh.

He won the silver medal at the 1993 Central American and Caribbean Games. He also competed at the 1992 Olympic Games without reaching the final.

== International competitions ==
Year	Competition	Venue	Position	Event	Notes
Representing Puerto Rico
1992	Ibero-American Championships	Seville, Spain	5th	Long jump	7.70 m (wind: +1.8 m/s)
1992	Ibero-American Championships	Seville, Spain	3rd (h)	4x100m relay	41.33
1993	Central American and Caribbean Games	Ponce, Puerto Rico	2nd	Long jump	7.92 m
