= Gabino Apolonio =

Mexican long-distance runner

Personal information
- Born: August 29, 1971 (age 55)

Sport
- Sport: Track and field
Medal record
Representing Mexico
Central American and Caribbean Games
Silver medal – second place	1993 Ponce	5000m
Bronze medal – third place	1998 Maracaibo	10,000m
Summer Universiade
Bronze medal – third place	1995 Fukuoka	10,000m

Gabino Apolonio Oro (born August 29, 1971) is a retired male long-distance runner from Mexico. He set his personal best (2:13:25) in the men's marathon on March 3, 2002, in Torreón.

A distance specialist, he enjoyed success at regional level in the mid-1990s, taking the silver medal over 5000 metres at the 1993 CAC Games and the 10,000 metres bronze medal at 1993 CAC Championships. He won another CAC Games medal in 1998, taking home the bronze in the men's 10,000. Today he is an assistant manager and teacher in a high school in Toluca, Mexico.

== Achievements ==
Year	Competition	Venue	Position	Event	Notes
Representing Mexico
1993	Central American and Caribbean Championships	Cali, Colombia	3rd	10,000 m	29:26.80
1993	Central American and Caribbean Games	Ponce, Puerto Rico	2nd	5000 m	14:06.43
1998	Central American and Caribbean Games	Maracaibo, Venezuela	3rd	10,000 m	30:11.29
