= Jorge Aguilera =

Cuban sprinter (born 1966)

Personal information
- Born: January 16, 1966 (age 60) Frank País, Holguín, Cuba

Sport
- Sport: Track and field
Medal record
Representing Cuba
Olympic Games
Bronze medal – third place	1992 Barcelona	4x100m relay
Summer Universiade
Bronze medal – third place	1993 Buffalo	4x100m relay
Pan American Games
Gold medal – first place	1991 Havana	4x100m relay
Gold medal – first place	1995 Mar del Plata	4x100m relay
Central American and Caribbean Games
Gold medal – first place	1993 Ponce	4x100m relay
Silver medal – second place	1990 Mexico City	100m
Bronze medal – third place	1993 Ponce	200m

Jorge Luis Aguilera Ruiz (born January 16, 1966) is a retired male track and field sprinter from Cuba who won an Olympic bronze medal in 4 x 100 metres relay at the 1992 Summer Olympics. He specialized in the 100 metres event, and his personal best of 10.57 was set in Zürich in 1993.

== Achievements ==
Year	Competition	Venue	Position	Event	Notes
Representing Cuba
1990	Central American and Caribbean Games	Mexico City, Mexico	2nd	100 m	10.29
1991	Pan American Games	Havana, Cuba	1st	4 × 100 m relay	39.08
1992	Ibero-American Championships	Seville, Spain	1st (h)	100 m	10.50 (-0.7 m/s)
1992	Ibero-American Championships	Seville, Spain	1st	4 × 100 m relay	39.19
1992	Olympic Games	Barcelona, Spain	3rd	4 × 100 m relay	38.00
1993	Universiade	Buffalo, United States	3rd	4 × 100 m relay	39.20
1993	Central American and Caribbean Games	Ponce, Puerto Rico	3rd	200 m	20.91
1993	Central American and Caribbean Games	Ponce, Puerto Rico	1st	4 × 100 m relay	39.24
1994	Ibero-American Championships	Mar del Plata, Argentina	3rd	100m	10.56 w (+3.2 m/s)
1994	Ibero-American Championships	Mar del Plata, Argentina	6th	200m	21.08 (+1.2 m/s)
1994	Ibero-American Championships	Mar del Plata, Argentina	1st	4 × 100 m relay	39.99
1994	Ibero-American Championships	Mar del Plata, Argentina	—	4 × 400 m relay	DQ
1995	Pan American Games	Mar del Plata, Argentina	1st	4 × 100 m relay	38.67
