= Kerry-Ann Richards =

Jamaican sprinter

Personal information
- Born: 22 April 1976 (age 50) Kingston, Jamaica

Sport
- Sport: Track and field
Medal record
Representing Jamaica
World Junior Championships
Gold medal – first place	1994 Lisbon	4x100m relay
Pan American Games
Gold medal – first place	1999 Winnipeg	4x100m relay
Central American and Caribbean Games
Bronze medal – third place	1993 Ponce	4x100m relay

Kerry-Ann Richards (born 22 April 1976) is a Jamaican track and field athlete. She represented her country in sprinting on several junior and senior teams. She won gold medals as part of the Jamaican 4×100 metres relay teams at the 1999 Pan American Games. Richards ran track collegiately at the University of Illinois at Urbana–Champaign where she was six-times Big Ten Conference champion, Big Ten Freshman of the Year and three times NCAA Division I All-American. Richards earned her master's degree at Illinois in 2000, was named to the National Dean's List as well as being an multiple times NCAA Academic All-American.
