= Desmond Hector =

Guyanese middle-distance runner

Personal information
- Nationality: Guyanese
- Born: 14 November 1968 (age 57)
- Height: 1.70 m (5 ft 7 in)
- Weight: 70 kg (154 lb)

Sport
- Sport: Middle-distance running
- Event: 800 metres
Medal record
Representing Guyana
Central American and Caribbean Games
Silver medal – second place	1993 Ponce	1500m

Desmond Hector (born 14 November 1968) is a Guyanese middle-distance runner. He competed in the men's 800 metres at the 1992 Summer Olympics.
