= Wilson Cañizales =

Colombian sprinter

Personal information
- Born: 23 June 1964 (age 61)
- Height: 1.76 m (5 ft 9 in)
- Weight: 67 kg (148 lb)

Sport
- Sport: Athletics
- Event(s): 200 m, 400 m

Wilson Cañizales (born 23 June 1964) is a retired Colombian sprinter who competed in the 200 and 400 metres. He represented his country in one outdoor and one indoor World Championships.

== International competitions ==
Year	Competition	Venue	Position	Event	Notes
Representing Colombia
1986	Goodwill Games	Moscow, Soviet Union	13th	400 m	48.75
1986	Goodwill Games	Moscow, Soviet Union	4th	4 × 100 m relay	41.44
1989	Bolivarian Games	Maracaibo, Venezuela	2nd	400 m	46.87
1989	Bolivarian Games	Maracaibo, Venezuela	2nd	4 × 100 m relay	40.91
1989	Bolivarian Games	Maracaibo, Venezuela	1st	4 × 400 m relay	3:13.20
1989	South American Championships	Medellín, Colombia	2nd	400 m	45.91
1989	South American Championships	Medellín, Colombia	2nd	4 × 100 m relay	39.87
1989	South American Championships	Medellín, Colombia	4th	4 × 400 m relay	3:09.78
1991	World Championships	Tokyo, Japan	24th (qf)	400 m	46.42
1992	Ibero-American Championships	Seville, Spain	9th (h)	400 m	47.26
1992	Ibero-American Championships	Seville, Spain	5th	4 × 100 m relay	40.50
1992	Ibero-American Championships	Seville, Spain	7th	4 × 400 m relay	3:12.55
1993	Bolivarian Games	Cochabamba, Bolivia	1st	400 m	46.3
1993	Bolivarian Games	Cochabamba, Bolivia	1st	4 × 100 m relay	39.96
1993	Bolivarian Games	Cochabamba, Bolivia	1st	4 × 400 m relay	3:10.51
1993	South American Championships	Lima, Peru	3rd	200 m	21.60
1993	South American Championships	Lima, Peru	1st	400 m	46.50
1993	South American Championships	Lima, Peru	2nd	4 × 400 m relay	3:09.1
1993	Central American and Caribbean Championships	Cali, Colombia	3rd	4 × 400 m relay	3:06.39
1993	Central American and Caribbean Games	Ponce, Puerto Rico	7th	400 m	47.19
1993	Central American and Caribbean Games	Ponce, Puerto Rico	3rd	4 × 100 m relay	40.09
1993	Central American and Caribbean Games	Ponce, Puerto Rico	5th	4 × 400 m relay	3:08.96
1995	World Indoor Championships	Barcelona, Spain	21st (h)	400 m	49.32
1995	Pacific Ocean Games	Cali, Colombia	2nd	400 m	46.81
1995	Pacific Ocean Games	Cali, Colombia	1st	4 × 100 m relay	39.81
1996	Ibero-American Championships	Medellín, Colombia	4th	200 m	21.16
1996	Ibero-American Championships	Medellín, Colombia	4th	4 × 100 m relay	40.62
1996	Ibero-American Championships	Medellín, Colombia	3rd	4 × 400 m relay	3:07.13

== Personal bests ==
Outdoor

- 100 metres – 10.45 (-0.4 m/s, Getafe 1991)
- 200 metres – 20.87 (+1.6 m/s, Arequipa 1997)
- 400 metres – 45.91 (Medellín 1989)

Indoor

- 400 metres – 49.32 (Barcelona 1995)
