= Maribelcy Peña =

Personal information
- Full name: Maribelcy Peña Lucumí
- Born: 2 June 1967 (age 58)

Sport
- Sport: Athletics
- Event: 400 metres hurdles

Maribelcy Peña Lucumí (born 2 June 1967) is a retired Colombian athlete who specialised in the 400 metres hurdles. She won multiple medals at the regional level.

== International competitions ==
Year	Competition	Venue	Position	Event	Notes
Representing Colombia
1985	Bolivarian Games	Cuenca, Ecuador	1st	4 × 100 m relay	47.89
1989	Bolivarian Games	Maracaibo, Venezuela	1st	400 m hurdles	61.21
1989	Bolivarian Games	Maracaibo, Venezuela	1st	4 × 400 m relay	3:44.42
1989	South American Championships	Medellín, Colombia	2nd	400 m hurdles	60.30
1989	South American Championships	Medellín, Colombia	1st	4 × 400 m relay	3:37.0
1990	Ibero-American Championships	Manaus, Brazil	7th	400 m hurdles	61.82
1990	Central American and Caribbean Games	Ponce, Puerto Rico	2nd	400 m hurdles	59.06
1990	Central American and Caribbean Games	Ponce, Puerto Rico	2nd	4 × 100 m relay	45.29
1991	South American Championships	Manaus, Brazil	2nd	400 m hurdles	57.23
1991	South American Championships	Manaus, Brazil	2nd	4 × 400 m relay	3:36.56
1991	Pan American Games	Havana, Cuba	7th	400 m hurdles	59.14
1991	Pan American Games	Havana, Cuba	4th	4 × 400 m relay	3:31.39
1992	Ibero-American Championships	Seville, Spain	5th	400 m hurdles	59.67
1992	Ibero-American Championships	Seville, Spain	3rd	4 × 100 m relay	45.54
1993	Bolivarian Games	Cochabamba, Bolivia	2nd	400 m hurdles	60.11
1993	Bolivarian Games	Cochabamba, Bolivia	1st	4 × 400 m relay	3:42.41
1993	Central American and Caribbean Championships	Cali, Colombia	3rd	4 × 400 m relay	3:34.29
1993	Central American and Caribbean Games	Ponce, Puerto Rico	2nd	400 m hurdles	58.68
1993	Central American and Caribbean Games	Ponce, Puerto Rico	2nd	4 × 400 m relay	3:36.82

== Personal bests ==
Outdoor

- 200 metres – 24.67 (-0.5 m/s, Ponce 1998)
- 400 metres – 54.68 (Ponce 1997)
- 400 metres hurdles – 57.23 (Manaus 1991)
