= Bernice Morton =

Saints Kitts and Nevis athlete (born 1969)

Bernice Morton (born 9 April 1969) she is a Saint Kitts and Nevis athlete.

She was part of the first ever team to represent Saint Kitts and Nevis at the Olympic Games when she competed at the 1996 Summer Olympic Games in the 4 x 100 metres relay, but the team failed to finish so didn't qualify for the next round.
