= Jacqueline Solíz =

Bolivian sprinter

Personal information
- Full name: Jacqueline Mercedes Solíz Inturias
- Nationality: Bolivian
- Born: 22 September 1964 (age 61)
- Height: 1.62 m (5 ft 4 in)
- Weight: 50 kg (110 lb)

Sport
- Sport: Sprinting
- Event: 200 metres
Medal record
Representing Bolivia
South American Games
Silver medal – second place	1990 Lima	4x100m relay

Jacqueline Mercedes Solíz Inturias (born 22 September 1964) is a Bolivian sprinter. She competed in the women's 200 metres at the 1992 Summer Olympics.
