= Genaro Rojas =

Mexican sprinter

Personal information
- Nationality: Mexican
- Born: 15 September 1970 (age 56) Chihuahua City, Mexico

Sport
- Sport: Sprinting
- Event: 4 × 100 metres relay

Genaro Rojas Trejo (born 15 September 1970) is a Mexican sprinter born on 15 September 1970. He competed in the men's 4 × 100 metres relay at the 1992 Summer Olympics.
