= Moré Galetovic =

Bolivian sprinter

Personal information
- Nationality: Bolivian
- Born: 1 March 1968 (age 58)

Sport
- Sport: Sprinting
- Event: 4 × 400 metres relay

Moré Silvia Galetovic Flores (born 1 March 1968) is a Bolivian sprinter. She competed in the women's 4 × 400 metres relay at the 1992 Summer Olympics.
