= Gabriel Simeon =

Personal information
- Full name: Gabriel Simeon
- Nationality: Grenada
- Born: 7 December 1971 (age 54) St. George's, Grenada

Achievements and titles
- Personal best(s): 100m 10.64; 200m 21.32

Gabriel Simeon (born 7 December 1971) is a former Grenadian sprinter who competed in the men's 100m competition at the 1992 Summer Olympics. He recorded an 11.10, not enough to qualify for the next round past the heats. His personal best is 10.64, set in 1992. In the 200m, he ran a 22.09.
