= John Palacio =

Belizean sprinter (born 1967)

Personal information
- Nationality: Belizean
- Born: 24 April 1967 (age 59)
- Height: 1.80 m (5 ft 11 in)
- Weight: 67 kg (148 lb)

Sport
- Sport: Sprinting
- Event: 4 × 100 metres relay

John Maurice Palacio (born 24 April 1967) is a Belizean sprinter. He competed in the men's 4 × 100 metres relay at the 1992 Summer Olympics.
