= Derry Pemberton =

American sprinter

Personal information
- Nationality: American Virgin Islander
- Born: February 1, 1971 (age 55)

Sport
- Sport: Sprinting
- Event: 4 × 100 metres relay
Medal record
Representing United States Virgin Islands
Pan American Games
Bronze medal – third place	1991 Havana	4x100m relay

Derry Pemberton (born February 1, 1971) is a sprinter who represents the United States Virgin Islands. He competed in the men's 4 × 100 metres relay at the 1992 Summer Olympics. Pemberton won a bronze medal in the 4 x 100 metres relay at the 1991 Pan American Games.

Hall of Fame
Year	
2019 Inaugural Class	US Virgin Islands Olympic Hall of Fame
