= Dazel Jules =

Trinidadian sprinter

Medal record

Men's athletics

Representing Trinidad and Tobago

World Indoor Championships
Silver medal – second place	1993 Toronto	4x400 m relay

Dazel Jules (born August 10, 1967) is a Trinidadian former sprinter. Along with Alvin Daniel, Neil de Silva and Ian Morris, he won a silver medal in the 4 × 400 m relay at the 1993 IAAF World Indoor Championships. In the CARIFTA Games under 20 division, he won silver in the 100 m in 1985, gold in the 100 m in 1986 and silver in the 200 m in 1986.

He attended Eastern Michigan University and graduated in 1990.
