= Neville Hodge =

Sprinter

Personal information
- Born: 8 December 1955 (age 70) Saint Kitts, Saint Kitts and Nevis

Sport
- Sport: Track and field
Medal record
Representing United States Virgin Islands
Pan American Games
Bronze medal – third place	1991 Havana	4x100m relay

Neville Gomez Hodge (born 8 December 1955) is a former United States Virgin Islands sprinter who competed in the men's 100m competition at the 1992 Summer Olympics. He recorded a 10.71, not enough to qualify for the next round past the heats. His personal best is 10.32, set in 1993. He also ran that Olympiad for the USVI 4x100m team, which recorded a 40.48, good for 5th place. Previously, in the 1988 Summer Olympics, he ran a 10.73 in the 100m contest. In the 1984 Summer Olympics, he ran 21.12 in the 200m, enough to qualify for the next round, where he did not start (DNS). He also ran in the 100m contest in 1984, scoring a 10.58, enough to qualify for round 2, where a 10.69 was not enough to advance further. He won a bronze medal in the 4 x 100 metres relay at the 1991 Pan American Games.

Hodge competed for the Morgan State Bears track and field team in the NCAA. He joined his alma mater Morgan State University as head coach of the track and cross country team in 1994.

Hall of Fame
Year	
2019 Inaugural Class	US Virgin Islands Olympic Hall of Fame
