= Daisy Ocasio =

Puerto Rican boxer and athlete

Personal information
- Nationality: Puerto Rican
- Born: Daisy Ocasio; November 3, 1964 (age 61) Brooklyn, New York
- Weight: Light Middleweight

Boxing career

Boxing record
- Total fights: 6
- Wins: 5
- Win by KO: 3
- Losses: 1
- Draws: 0
- No contests: 0

Daisy Ocasio (born November 3, 1964) is a well known Puerto Rican athlete. A participant of Marathon and Track and Field races, she is also a former female boxer.

Ocasio was born Brooklyn, New York. Although she and Ossie Ocasio shared one sport, boxing, and the same last name, Ocasio, it is not known whether the two have a family connection.

Daisy Ocasio had an accomplished career in the running fields, holding various records at different international races. In 1991, she participated as a Track and Field runner at the Havana, Cuba Pan American Games. She also participated at various international championships such as the Central American and Caribbean Games, Ibero-American Championships in Athletics, and Central American and Caribbean Championships in Athletics.

Ocasio's photos were commonly seen on Puerto Rican newspapers during the early 1990s, when she was at the top of her career as a runner. She continued on running, and winning races, until the late 1990s. Many Puerto Ricans came to identify her, just as they did with Angelita Lind during the 1980s, as one of the most important runners of Puerto Rico. That's why, when she announced she would become a female boxer, she caused some shock among many of her fans.

On July 23, 1998, she debuted as a boxer, defeating Andrea Figueroa by a knockout in round two at Vega Baja. Only nineteen days later, she beat Lizette Pizarro by a knockout in the first round, also in her hometown.

On November 7 of that year, she beat Marischa Sjau, in Lake Worth, Florida, to mark her United States debut. By then, she had moved to Florida to train.

On March 3, 1999, she beat Pamela Clarke, by then considered a top fighter, by a knockout in three rounds at Miami. Then, on December 8 came what could be considered as her best victory: facing future world champion Patricia Demick of Chile, Ocasio won by a six-round unanimous decision.

On April 15, 2000, in what would turn out to be her last fight, she was knocked out by future world champion Britt Van Buskirk, in Temecula, California.

She retired from women's boxing with a record of five wins and one loss, with three knockout wins.

Currently in her 50s, Ocasio has returned to live full-time in Puerto Rico.

== Professional boxing record ==
6 fights	5 wins	1 loss
By knockout	3	1
By decision	2	0

No.	Result	Record	Opponent	Type	Round, time	Date	Location	Notes
6	Loss	5–1	(United States) Britt Van Buskirk	KO	2	Apr 15, 2000	Pechanga Resort & Casino, Temecula, California, United States	
5	Win	5–0	(United States) Patricia Demick	UD	6, 2:00	Dec 8, 1999	Cristal Nightclub, Miami Beach, Florida, United States	
4	Win	4–0	(United States) Pamela Clarke	TKO	1, 0:50	Mar 10, 1999	Four Ambassadors Hotel, Miami, Florida, United States	
3	Win	3–0	(Netherlands) Marischa Sjauw	MD	4, 2:00	Nov 7, 1998	Sons Of Italy, Lake Worth, Florida United States	
2	Win	2–0	(United States) Lizette Pizzarro	TKO	1	Aug 12, 1998	(United States) Coliseo Moises Navedo, Vega Baja, Puerto Rico	
1	Win	1–0	(United States) Andrea Figureoa	TKO	2	Jul 23, 1998	(United States) Coliseo Moises Navedo, Vega Baja, Puerto Rico	

== See also ==
- List of Puerto Ricans
