= 1993 Central American and Caribbean Games =

Sports events held in Ponce, Puerto Rico

XVII Central American and Caribbean Games
- Ponce '93 Logo
- Host city: Ponce, Puerto Rico
- Nations: 31
- Athletes: 3,570
- Events: 39 sports
- Opening: 19 November 1993
- Closing: 30 November 1993
- Opened by: Governor Pedro Rosselló
- Torch lighter: Juan "Pachín" Vicéns
- Main venue: Francisco Montaner Stadium

The 17th Central American and Caribbean Games were held in Ponce, a city in southern Puerto Rico. The Games were held 19–30 November 1993, and included 3,570 athletes from 31 nations.

== History of the 1993 Games ==
=== Organization and planning ===
The city of Ponce hosted the seventeenth CACG less than three years after the Sixteenth Games in Mexico City. The ODECABE staff developed a more close working relationship with the Games organizers in Puerto Rico to carry out the Games in the context of the commemorative celebrations of the discovery of Puerto Rico exactly 500 years earlier to the opening ceremony day, in 1493. The Games were due to take place in 1994, but were anticipated for 1993 to coincide with the 500th anniversary of the discovery of the Island by the Spaniards. Due to this, the event raised a distinctly Hispanic environment. Governor Pedro Rosselló became involved in a clash with mayor Rafael Cordero Santiago, leading to less funding and a push to move some events to San Juan. The latter was favored and the events were retained in the southern coast. In turn, Rosselló was booed during the opening ceremony. Puerto Rico presented its largest delegation to date.

=== Historic coincidence ===
Exactly five centuries before the Ponce '93 Games, the island of Puerto Rico had been discovered by the Spaniards and in 1993 the city of Ponce became the second city in Puerto Rico to host the oldest regional games in the world. The organizers had carried out these games over fewer days than any other previous CACG since 1932, even though there were more countries competing in more sports for more medals and over more venues than at any other time in the history of the Games.

=== Record competitions ===
It was the first time that the Games were celebrated over only 10 days and apart the Ponce City the 31 sports held on island, they are held at in venues spread in 22 of the 78 municipalities of Puerto Rico. The number of countries competing in these Games, 31, was a record for the Games until the 2018 edition, when the territories without NOCs were invited to compete at the games.The only NOC who doesn't send a delegation was Dominica.

385 finals were held in 32 sports. Of these, Puerto Rico entered 31, and only in canoeing the territory did not register athletes. In a decentralized way, this sport was the only one that did not have events held on the island.Three new sports are added at the program:handball, skating, and kárate-do.Due a lack of suitable venues and athletes canoeing events took place in Havana, bringing the total number of participating countries to 32.Cuba was originally going to boycott the event due to the fact that it would be held on American territory, but the relocation of canoeing to Havana was one of the guarantees that made the retroactive decision of the government and the country sent a delegation to Ponce.

=== Leadership ===
The organizing committee was initially presided by Ponce attorney Esteban Rodríguez Maduro until the committee was dissolved in 1992. A new Committee was formed in August 1992, presided by Dr. Héctor López Pumarejo. The new Committee was formed just 15 months before the inaugural day of the Games.

=== Controversies ===
The Games were not free of controversies. A major one occurred when the Organizing Committee attempted to move several of the events to the San Juan area, with the intentions of saving money and taking advantage of the existing infrastructure.This action provoked a heated debate between the sports community and the mayor of Ponce Rafael Cordero Santiago, stayed his arguments managed to maintain its arguments and managed to convince ODECAC so that the event could continue in the city. The arguments convinced the autoroties and the games remained in Ponce, which continued as the main venue of the event. The CAC village, however, was located in Salinas, around 40 minutes from Ponce from car to Ponce, and the village of the Games' judges was built in the municipality of Villalba, which was closer to Ponce, being just a 20-minute drive away.

Another divergence was about a debate over moving the períod of the games from November 1993 to July 1994, when the Government of Puerto Rico cut off funding for the Games at the last phase of the project and organized a popular referendum over the issue.The referendum taken place some days prior to the scheduled opening ceremony of the Games. This controversies drained the organizers and athletes alike, but the Games took acord the planned period.

=== Opening ceremonies ===
The Games centered on the Francisco Montaner Stadium.Around 20,000 people were at the venue during the opening ceremony.At the event, the cauldron was lit by basketball player Juan “Pachín” Vicéns, having received the torch from the Puerto Rican silver medalists that participated in the 1930 Games in Havana.These were Eugenio Guerra and Manuel Luciano, as well as from Rebekah Colberg, the first Puerto Rican woman to win gold in the 1938 Games in Panama. The opening ceremony occurred in the midst of the use of special effects as laser rays, smoke, and plus local plena music, including vejigantes, including local musical icons as world know singer Chayanne and the El Gran Combo de Puerto Rico.

=== Participation ===
There were 4,853 participants, comprising 2,510 male athletes, 1,060 women athletes, and 1,283 officials. The Cuban delegation was the most numerous with 786, including 565 athletes. Puerto Rico had the largest delegation in its history with 741 participants, including 544 athletes, made up of 366 males, 178 females, and 197 officials, delegates, physicians, and coaches. Puerto Rico participated in 31 of the 32 sports. It did not participate in the canoeing competition. Mexico was the next-largest delegation with 616 participants.

=== Top win and records broken ===
Cuba won the most medals, at 364. It was Cuba's largest win ever. It included 227 gold medals, a record-breaking number in the Games. Mexico followed next with 240 medals, including 66 gold medals. Venezuela and Puerto Rico followed closely after. Venezuela beat Puerto Rico by a 2-medal count, winning third place with 155 medals, including 23 gold medals. Puerto Rico won fourth place with 153 medals including 23 gold medals. It was Puerto Rico's highest medal win ever. Colombia followed in fifth place with 101 medals, and tied with Puerto Rico on the gold medal wins.

The XVII Games witnessed the world records in weight-lifting by the Cuban athletes William Vargas and Pablo Lara.

== Sports ==
- Archery
- Artistic gymnastics
- Athletics
- Baseball
- Basketball
- Bowling
- Boxing
- Canoeing
- Cycling
- Diving
- Equestrian
- Fencing
- Field hockey
- Football
- Handball
- Judo
- Karate
- Rhythmic gymnastics
- Racquetball
- Roller skating
- Rowing
- Sailing
- Shooting
- Softball
- Synchronized swimming
- Swimming
- Table tennis
- Taekwondo
- Tennis
- Volleyball
- Water polo
- Weightlifting
- Wrestling

== Medal table ==
Place	Nation	1st place, gold medalist(s)	2nd place, silver medalist(s)	3rd place, bronze medalist(s)	Total
1	Cuba	227	76	61	364
2	Mexico	66	106	68	240
3	Venezuela	23	54	78	155
4	Puerto Rico	22	53	78	153
5	Colombia	22	45	34	101
6	Dominican Republic	6	18	25	49
7	Costa Rica	5	7	15	27
8	Guatemala	3	8	37	48
9	Trinidad and Tobago	3	7	6	16
10	Suriname	2	0	1	3
11	Virgin Islands	1	1	2	4
12	Honduras	1	1	0	2
13	Nicaragua	1	0	5	6
14	Netherlands Antilles	1	0	3	4
14	Bahamas	1	0	3	4
16	Aruba	1	0	0	1
17	El Salvador	0	2	9	11
18	Panama	0	2	2	4
19	Bermuda	0	2	1	3
20	Jamaica	0	1	10	11
21	Guyana	0	1	7	8
22	Haiti	0	1	2	3
22	Cayman Islands	0	1	2	3
24	Barbados	0	0	5	5
25	Antigua and Barbuda	0	0	2	2
Total		385	386	456	1227

== Commemorative Plaque ==
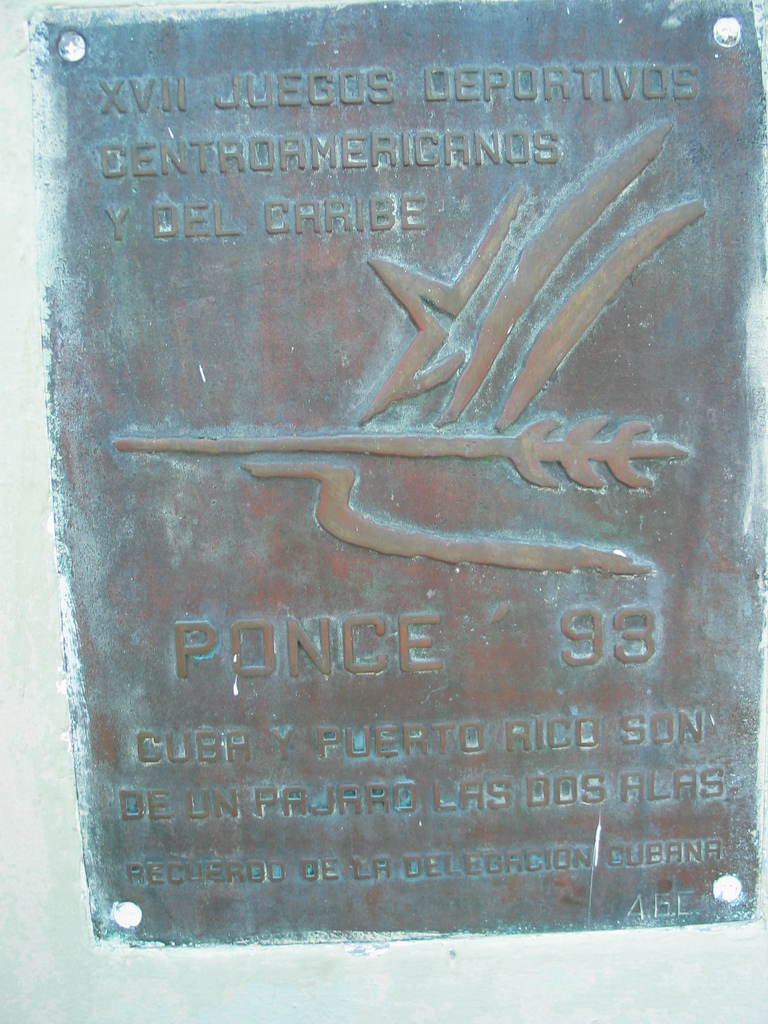
Commemorative plaque of the Games left to Puerto Rico and the City of Ponce by the Cuban Delegation

A commemorative plaque for the games was given to Puerto Rico's CACG Committee by the head of the Cuban delegation to the Games. The plaque reads (in Spanish) "XVII Juegos Deportivos Centroamericanos y del Caribe. Ponce '93. Cuba y Puerto Rico son de un pajaro las dos alas. Recuerdo de la Delegacion Cubana. A.G.C." (XVII Central American and Caribbean Games. Ponce '93. Cuba and Puerto Rico are the two wings of one same bird. A commemorative gift of the Cuban delegation. A.G.C.). The plaque was then added to the podium structure at the Pedro Albizu Campos Park in Ponce, Puerto Rico, where it currently remains.
