= 1997 World Championships in Athletics – Men's 100 metres =

Men's 100 metres at the 1997 World Championships
- Venue: Olympic Stadium
- Dates: 2 August (heats and quarter-finals); 3 August (semi-finals and final)
- Competitors: 101
- Winning time: 9.86 CR

Medalists
gold medal	Maurice Greene	United States
silver medal	Donovan Bailey	Canada
bronze medal	Tim Montgomery	United States

These are the results of the Men's 100 metres event at the 1997 World Championships in Athletics in Athens, Greece.

== Medalists ==
Gold	Maurice Greene; United States (USA)
Silver	Donovan Bailey; Canada (CAN)
Bronze	Tim Montgomery; United States (USA)

== Results ==
=== Heats ===
First 3 of each Heat (Q) and the next 9 fastest (q) qualified for the quarterfinals.

Rank	Heat	Name	Nationality	Time	Notes
1	4	Angelos Pavlakakis	Greece	10.11	Q, NR
1	6	Ato Boldon	Trinidad and Tobago	10.11	Q
3	7	Tim Montgomery	United States	10.12	Q
4	5	Michael Marsh	United States	10.16	Q
4	10	Eric Nkansah	Ghana	10.16	Q
6	4	Donovan Bailey	Canada	10.17	Q
7	10	Percival Spencer	Jamaica	10.18	Q
8	9	Frankie Fredericks	Namibia	10.21	Q
9	10	Darren Campbell	Great Britain	10.21	Q, SB
11	7	Francis Obikwelu	Nigeria	10.22	Q
11	11	Nobuharu Asahara	Japan	10.22	Q
11	12	Robert Esmie	Canada	10.22	Q
14	12	Davidson Ezinwa	Nigeria	10.23	Q
15	8	Seun Ogunkoya	Nigeria	10.24	Q
15	12	Emmanuel Tuffour	Ghana	10.24	Q, SB
17	4	Stefano Tilli	Italy	10.25	Q, SB
17	9	Aleksandr Porkhomovskiy	Russia	10.25	Q, SB
19	4	Marlon Devonish	Great Britain	10.26	q
19	7	Aziz Zakari	Ghana	10.26	Q, PB
19	9	Carlos Calado	Portugal	10.26	Q
19	11	Obadele Thompson	Barbados	10.26	Q
23	1	André da Silva	Brazil	10.28	Q
23	9	Sergejs Inšakovs	Latvia	10.28	q, NR
25	5	Patrick Stevens	Belgium	10.30	Q
25	10	Yiannis Zisimides	Cyprus	10.30	q, SB
27	1	Jean-Olivier Zirignon	Ivory Coast	10.31	Q
28	3	Maurice Greene	United States	10.32	Q
28	3	Peter Karlsson	Sweden	10.32	Q, SB
28	8	Charalambos Papadias	Greece	10.32	Q
28	11	Jone Delai	Fiji	10.32	Q
28	13	Bruny Surin	Canada	10.32	Q
33	6	Luis Alberto Perez-Rionda	Cuba	10.33	Q
34	4	Renward Wells	Bahamas	10.34	q
34	4	Martin Lachkovics	Austria	10.34	q, PB
34	11	Donovan Powell	Jamaica	10.34	q
37	5	Anninos Marcoullides	Cyprus	10.35	Q
37	7	Sayon Cooper	Liberia	10.35	q
39	12	Prodromos Katsantonis	Cyprus	10.36	q
40	2	Marcin Krzywański	Poland	10.37	Q
41	2	Andrey Fedoriv	Russia	10.38	Q
41	8	Ryszard Pilarczyk	Poland	10.38	Q
42	2	Stephane Cali	France	10.39	Q
44	10	Hiroyasu Tsuchie	Japan	10.40	q
45	3	Piotr Balcerzak	Poland	10.41	Q
45	12	Augustine Nketia	New Zealand	10.41	
47	3	Per Ivar Sivle	Norway	10.42	
47	6	Ian Mackie	Great Britain	10.42	Q
47	7	Ousmane Diarra	Mali	10.42	
50	1	Chris Donaldson	New Zealand	10.43	Q
50	6	Carlos Gats	Argentina	10.43	SB
50	11	Chintake De Zoysa	Sri Lanka	10.43	
50	13	Erik Wijmeersch	Belgium	10.43	Q
54	2	Torbjörn Mårtensson	Sweden	10.46	
54	5	Koji Ito	Japan	10.46	
56	6	Miguel Janssen	Aruba	10.47	
57	13	Saad Al-Kuwari	Qatar	10.48	Q
58	1	Carlton Chambers	Canada	10.49	
58	11	Anvar Kuchmuradov	Uzbekistan	10.49	
60	6	Ibrahim Meité	Ivory Coast	10.50	
60	8	Issa-Aime Nthepe	Cameroon	10.50	
60	9	Carlos Villaseñor	Mexico	10.50	
63	1	Paulo Neves	Portugal	10.51	
64	3	Dennis Mowatt	Jamaica	10.52	
64	5	Joseph Styles	Bahamas	10.52	
66	6	Carlos Moreno	Chile	10.53	
67	7	Frutos Feo	Spain	10.54	
68	12	Ivan Šlehobr	Czech Republic	10.55	
69	13	Juan Pedro Toledo	Mexico	10.56	
70	2	Neil Ryan	Ireland	10.57	
71	5	Alexandros Genovelis	Greece	10.58	
72	13	Jose Illan	Spain	10.60	
73	2	Tommy Kafri	Israel	10.64	
73	8	Tomaž Božič	Slovenia	10.64	
75	8	Horace Dove-Edwin	Sierra Leone	10.65	
76	4	Ruslan Rusidze	Georgia	10.67	
76	5	Wai Lok To	Hong Kong	10.67	
78	3	Nigel Jones	Grenada	10.68	
79	2	Patrick Mocci Raoumbe	Gabon	10.69	
80	7	Lee Heyeong-Gum	South Korea	10.73	
81	3	Antonio Serpas	El Salvador	10.77	
81	12	Peter Pulu	Papua New Guinea	10.77	
83	1	Pascal Dangbo	Benin	10.78	
83	3	De-Von Bean	Bermuda	10.78	
85	9	Gabriel Simon	Argentina	10.79	
86	7	Mohd Mahbub Alam	Bangladesh	10.83	
87	1	Toluta'u Koula	Tonga	10.85	
88	9	Maocha Mpho	Botswana	10.86	
89	8	Mario Bonello	Malta	10.92	
89	13	Amarildo Almeida	Guinea-Bissau	10.92	
91	10	Laurence Jack	Vanuatu	10.97	
92	12	Trevor Davis	Angola	11.07	
93	13	Huang Hsin-Ping	Chinese Taipei	11.09	
94	4	Albert Shaw Elston	Belize	11.13	
95	8	Mohamed Amir	Maldives	11.18	NR
96	10	Detrickson Anson	Federated States of Micronesia	11.47	
97	1	Watson Nyambek	Malaysia	11.60	
98	2	Nelson Kabitana	Solomon Islands	11.61	
99	11	Norberto Nsue Ondo	Equatorial Guinea	11.65	
100	11	Daniel Adachi	Palau	11.90	
101	5	Kim Collins	Saint Kitts and Nevis	21.73	
	9	Venancio José	Spain	DQ	
	10	Igor Strakh	Ukraine	DNF	

=== Quarterfinals ===
First 2 of each Heat (Q) and the next 4 fastest (q) qualified for the semifinals.

Rank	Heat	Name	Nationality	Time	Notes
1	1	Ato Boldon	Trinidad and Tobago	9.87	Q, WL
2	1	Maurice Greene	United States	9.90	Q
3	3	Tim Montgomery	United States	9.99	Q
3	6	Frankie Fredericks	Namibia	9.99	Q
5	4	Michael Marsh	United States	10.05	Q
6	2	Bruny Surin	Canada	10.06	Q, SB
7	3	Donovan Bailey	Canada	10.10	Q
8	6	Davidson Ezinwa	Nigeria	10.11	Q
9	3	Darren Campbell	Great Britain	10.13	q, PB
10	5	Eric Nkansah	Ghana	10.15	Q
11	5	Francis Obikwelu	Nigeria	10.17	Q
11	6	Nobuharu Asahara	Japan	10.17	q
13	3	Sayon Cooper	Liberia	10.21	q
13	6	Obadele Thompson	Barbados	10.21	q
15	1	Andrey Fedoriv	Russia	10.22	
15	2	Angelos Pavlakakis	Greece	10.22	Q
17	1	Charalambos Papadias	Greece	10.23	PB
17	4	Emmanuel Tuffour	Ghana	10.23	Q, SB
19	1	Ian Mackie	Great Britain	10.24	
20	2	Luis Alberto Perez-Rionda	Cuba	10.25	
20	4	Jean-Olivier Zirignon	Ivory Coast	10.25	
20	5	Robert Esmie	Canada	10.25	
23	3	Ryszard Pilarczyk	Poland	10.26	PB
24	4	Aleksandr Porkhomovskiy	Russia	10.27	
25	6	Aziz Zakari	Ghana	10.29	
26	5	Patrick Stevens	Belgium	10.31	
27	2	Piotr Balcerzak	Poland	10.32	
28	1	Marcin Krzywański	Poland	10.33	
28	2	Prodromos Katsantonis	Cyprus	10.33	
28	4	Seun Ogunkoya	Nigeria	10.33	
31	2	Erik Wijmeersch	Belgium	10.34	
31	5	Sergejs Inšakovs	Latvia	10.34	
33	4	Donovan Powell	Jamaica	10.35	
34	5	Stefano Tilli	Italy	10.36	
35	4	Marlon Devonish	Great Britain	10.37	
35	6	Yiannis Zisimides	Cyprus	10.37	
37	1	Hiroyasu Tsuchie	Japan	10.38	
38	4	Anninos Marcoullides	Cyprus	10.39	
38	6	Martin Lachkovics	Austria	10.39	
40	1	Chris Donaldson	New Zealand	10.40	
40	3	Saad Al-Kuwari	Qatar	10.40	PB
40	3	Peter Karlsson	Sweden	10.40	
43	6	Carlos Calado	Portugal	10.41	
44	2	Stephane Cali	France	10.47	
44	5	Jone Delai	Fiji	10.47	
46	5	Renward Wells	Bahamas	10.57	
47	3	André da Silva	Brazil	12.56	
	2	Percival Spencer	Jamaica	DNS	

=== Semifinals ===
First 4 of each Semifinal qualified directly (Q) for the final.

Rank	Heat	Name	Nationality	Time	Notes
1	2	Maurice Greene	United States	9.90	Q
2	2	Donovan Bailey	Canada	9.91	Q, SB
3	2	Frankie Fredericks	Namibia	9.93	Q
4	1	Ato Boldon	Trinidad and Tobago	10.00	Q
5	2	Tim Montgomery	United States	10.08	Q
6	1	Davidson Ezinwa	Nigeria	10.15	Q
7	2	Eric Nkansah	Ghana	10.18	
8	2	Francis Obikwelu	Nigeria	10.20	
9	1	Michael Marsh	United States	10.21	Q
10	1	Bruny Surin	Canada	10.22	Q
11	1	Angelos Pavlakakis	Greece	10.29	
12	1	Obadele Thompson	Barbados	10.30	
12	2	Sayon Cooper	Liberia	10.30	
14	1	Emmanuel Tuffour	Ghana	10.33	
14	2	Nobuharu Asahara	Japan	10.33	
16	1	Darren Campbell	Great Britain	10.37	

=== Final ===
Rank	Lane	Name	Nationality	Time	Notes
1st place, gold medalist(s)	3	Maurice Greene	United States	9.86	=CR
2nd place, silver medalist(s)	4	Donovan Bailey	Canada	9.91	
3rd place, bronze medalist(s)	7	Tim Montgomery	United States	9.94	
4	2	Frankie Fredericks	Namibia	9.95	
5	6	Ato Boldon	Trinidad and Tobago	10.02	
6	5	Davidson Ezinwa	Nigeria	10.10	
7	1	Bruny Surin	Canada	10.12	
8	8	Michael Marsh	United States	10.29	
