= 1997 World Championships in Athletics – Men's 4 × 100 metres relay =

The 4 × 100 metres relay at the 1997 World Championships in Athletics was held at the Olympic Stadium on August 9 and August 10.

== Medals ==
Gold	Silver	Bronze
Canada; Robert Esmie; Glenroy Gilbert; Bruny Surin; Donovan Bailey	Nigeria; Osmond Ezinwa; Olapade Adeniken; Francis Obikwelu; Davidson Ezinwa	Great Britain; Darren Braithwaite; Darren Campbell; Douglas Walker; Julian Golding

== Results ==
=== Heats ===
All times shown are in seconds.

AR area record | CR championship record | GR games record | NR national record | OR Olympic record | PB personal best | SB season best | WL world leading (in a given season)
DNS = did not start | DQ = disqualification | NM = no mark (i.e. no valid result) | Q = qualification by place in heat | q = qualification by overall place

==== Heat 1 ====
1. Ghana (Abu Duah, Eric Nkansah, Aziz Zakari, Emmanuel Tuffour) 38.41 Q (NR)
2. Sweden (Patrik Lövgren, Torbjörn Mårtensson, Torbjörn Eriksson, Peter Karlsson) 39.04 Q (SB)
3. Ukraine (Aleksey Chikhachov, Serhiy Osovych, Oleh Kramarenko, Vladyslav Dolohodin) 39.32 Q (SB)
4. Mexico (Carlos Villaseñor, Alejandro Banda, Jaime de Jesus Lopez, Juan Pedro Toledo) 39.93
  - United States (Brian Lewis, Tim Montgomery, Dennis Mitchell, Maurice Greene) DNF
  - Jamaica (Donovan Powell, Dennis Mowatt, Garth Robinson, Cawley Elston) DNS
  - Cyprus DNS

==== Heat 2 ====
1. Brazil (Vicente de Lima, Claudinei da Silva, Robson da Silva, Édson Luciano Ribeiro) 38.31 Q (AR)
2. Canada (Carlton Chambers, Glenroy Gilbert, Bruny Surin, Donovan Bailey) 38.36 Q (SB)
3. Japan (Satoru Inoue, Koji Ito, Hiroyasu Tsuchie, Nobuharu Asahara) 38.44 Q (AR)
4. Nigeria (Osmond Ezinwa, Olapade Adeniken, Francis Obikwelu, Davidson Ezinwa) 38.46 q
5. Portugal (Paulo Neves, Mário Barbosa, Paulo Figueiredo, Carlos Calado) 39.37 (SB)
6. Slovenia (Marko Štor, Urban Acman, Tomaz Božic, Gregor Breznik) 39.62 (NR)
7. New Zealand (Augustine Nketia, Chris Donaldson, Paul Gibbons, Donald MacDonald) 39.66
8. Liberia (Kouty Mawenh, Sayon Cooper, Robert Dennis, Edward Neufville) 39.90 (NR)

==== Heat 3 ====
1. Great Britain (Darren Campbell, Marlon Devonish, Darren Braithwaite, Julian Golding) 38.47 Q (SB)
2. France (Emmanuel Bangué, Frédéric Krantz, Olivier Théophile, Stéphane Cali) 38.80 Q (SB)
3. Spain (Frutos Feo, Venancio José, Jordi Mayoral, Francisco Javier Navarro) 38.87 Q
4. Poland (Marcin Krzywański, Dariusz Adamczyk, Piotr Balcerzak, Ryszard Pilarczyk) 39.00 q (SB)
5. Bahamas (Renward Wells, Andrew Tynes, Dennis Darling, Joseph Styles) 39.09 q (NR)
6. Ireland (Kevin Cogley, Gary Ryan, Tom Comyns, Neil Ryan) 39.46 (NR)
7. Cameroon (Alfred Moussambani, Issa-Aimé Nthépé, Serge Bengono, Claude Toukene) 39.73
  - Ivory Coast (Eric Pacome N'Dri, Jean-Olivier Zirignon, Ahmed Douhou, Ibrahim Meité) DQ

==== Heat 4 ====
1. Cuba (Alfredo García-Baró, Misael Ortíz, Iván García, Luis Alberto Pérez-Rionda) 38.64 Q (SB)
2. Greece (Alexandros Yenovelis, Thomas Sbokos, Georgios Panagiotopoulos, Aggelos Pavlakakis) 38.74 Q (NR)
3. Italy (Andrea Amici, Giovanni Puggioni, Carlo Occhiena, Sandro Floris) 38.97 Q
4. Qatar (Jassim Abbas, Sultan Mohamed Al-Sheib, Sulaiman Jama Yusuf, Saad Al-Kuwari) 39.05 q (NR)
5. Hungary (Viktor Kovács, Miklós Gyulai, Szabolcs Alexa, Gábor Dobos) 39.38 (SB)
6. Australia (Ryan Witnish, Damien Marsh, Steve Brimacombe, Rod Mapstone) 39.39 (SB)
  - Fiji DNS

=== Semi-finals ===
==== Heat 1 ====
1. Ghana (Abu Duah, Eric Nkansah, Aziz Zakari, Emmanuel Tuffour) 38.12 Q (NR)
2. Great Britain (Dwain Chambers, Darren Campbell, Darren Braithwaite, Julian Golding) 38.25 Q (SB)
3. Spain (Frutos Feo, Venancio José, Jordi Mayoral, Carlos Berlanga) 38.60 Q (NR)
4. France (Emmanuel Bangué, Frédéric Krantz, Olivier Théophile, Stéphane Cali) 38.71 Q (SB)
5. Italy (Andrea Amici, Giovanni Puggioni, Carlo Occhiena, Sandro Floris) 38.77
6. Poland (Marcin Krzywański, Dariusz Adamczyk, Piotr Balcerzak, Ryszard Pilarczyk) 38.79 (SB)
7. Qatar (Jassim Abbas, Sultan Mohamed Al-Sheib, Sulaiman Jama Yusuf, Saad Al-Kuwari) 39.53
  - Greece (Alexandros Yenovelis, Thomas Sbokos, Georgios Panagiotopoulos, Aggelos Pavlakakis) DNF

==== Heat 2 ====
1. Nigeria (Osmond Ezinwa, Olapade Adeniken, Francis Obikwelu, Davidson Ezinwa) 37.94 Q (WL)
2. Cuba (Alfredo García-Baró, Misael Ortíz, Iván García, Luis Alberto Pérez-Rionda) 38.06 Q (SB)
3. Canada (Robert Esmie, Glenroy Gilbert, Bruny Surin, Donovan Bailey) 38.15 Q (SB)
4. Brazil (Vicente de Lima, Claudinei da Silva, Robson da Silva, Édson Luciano Ribeiro) 38.17 Q (AR)
5. Japan (Satoru Inoue, Koji Ito, Hiroyasu Tsuchie, Nobuharu Asahara) 38.31 (AR)
6. Sweden (Patrik Lövgren, Torbjörn Mårtensson, Torbjörn Eriksson, Peter Karlsson) 38.89 (SB)
7. Bahamas (Renward Wells, Andrew Tynes, Dennis Darling, Joseph Styles) 39.12
  - Ukraine (Aleksey Chikhachov, Serhiy Osovych, Igor Strakh, Vladyslav Dolohodin) DNF

=== Final ===
1. Canada (Robert Esmie, Glenroy Gilbert, Bruny Surin, Donovan Bailey) 37.86 (WL)
2. Nigeria (Osmond Ezinwa, Olapade Adeniken, Francis Obikwelu, Davidson Ezinwa) 38.07
3. Great Britain (Darren Braithwaite, Darren Campbell, Douglas Walker, Julian Golding) 38.14 (SB)
4. Cuba (Alfredo García-Baró, Misael Ortíz, Iván García, Luis Alberto Pérez-Rionda) 38.15
5. Ghana (Abu Duah, Eric Nkansah, Aziz Zakari, Emmanuel Tuffour) 38.26
6. Brazil (Vicente de Lima, Claudinei da Silva, Robson da Silva, Édson Luciano Ribeiro) 38.48
7. Spain (Frutos Feo, Venancio José, Jordi Mayoral, Carlos Berlanga) 38.72
  - France (Emmanuel Bangué, Frédéric Krantz, Gilles Quénéhervé, Stéphane Cali) DQ
