= 1998 European Athletics Championships – Men's 100 metres =

Men's 100 metres at the 1998 European Athletics Championships
- Venue: Népstadion
- Location: Budapest
- Dates: 18-19 August
- Competitors: 46 from 23 nations
- Winning time: 10.04

Medalists
gold medal	Darren Campbell	Great Britain
silver medal	Dwain Chambers	Great Britain
bronze medal	Haralabos Papadias	Greece

The men's 100 metres at the 1998 European Athletics Championships was held at the Népstadion on 18 and 19 August.

== Results ==
KEY:	q	Fastest non-qualifiers	Q	Qualified	NR	National record	PB	Personal best	SB	Seasonal best

=== Round 1 ===
Qualification: First 4 in each heat (Q) and the next 8 fastest (q) advance to the Round 2.

Rank	Heat	Name	Nationality	Time	Notes
1	5	Haralabos Papadias	Greece	10.27	Q
2	5	Dwain Chambers	Great Britain	10.28	Q
3	1	Marcin Nowak	Poland	10.35	Q
3	5	Aleksandr Porkhomovskiy	Russia	10.35	Q
5	6	David Dolle	Switzerland	10.36	Q
6	1	Stefano Tilli	Italy	10.37	Q
6	5	Miklós Gyulai	Hungary	10.37	Q
8	1	Anninos Marcoullides	Cyprus	10.38	Q
8	2	Marlon Devonish	Great Britain	10.38	Q
8	3	Geir Moen	Norway	10.38	Q
11	4	Darren Campbell	Great Britain	10.40	Q
12	5	Ryszard Pilarczyk	Poland	10.41	q
13	1	Erlend Sæterstøl	Norway	10.45	Q
13	6	Gábor Dobos	Hungary	10.45	Q
13	5	Andrea Amici	Italy	10.45	q
16	3	Needy Guims	France	10.47	Q
16	3	Tero Ridanpää	Finland	10.47	Q, SB
18	3	Urban Acman	Slovenia	10.48	Q
18	6	John Ertzgaard	Norway	10.48	Q, PB
20	6	Reşat Oğuz	Turkey	10.49	Q
20	1	Diego Santos	Spain	10.49	q
22	6	Angelos Pavlakakis	Greece	10.50	q
23	4	Marcin Krzywański	Poland	10.51	Q
24	4	Alexandros Yenovelis	Greece	10.52	Q
25	3	Mário Barbosa	Portugal	10.54	q
25	6	Frédéric Krantz	France	10.54	q
27	2	Stéphane Cali	France	10.57	Q
28	4	Anatoliy Dovhal	Ukraine	10.58	Q
28	3	Yiannis Zisimides	Cyprus	10.58	q
28	4	Janne Haapasalo	Finland	10.58	q
31	2	Francesco Scuderi	Italy	10.59	Q
31	6	Carlos Berlanga	Spain	10.59	
33	2	Roland Németh	Hungary	10.61	Q
34	2	Harri Kivelä	Finland	10.63	
35	1	Tommy Kafri	Israel	10.66	
36	4	Ludvík Bohman	Czech Republic	10.69	SB
37	5	Martin Brinarský	Slovakia	10.73	
38	4	Damjan Spur	Slovenia	10.74	
39	4	Dennis Tilburg	Netherlands	10.77	
40	1	Ivo Krsek	Czech Republic	10.79	
41	3	Frutos Feo	Spain	10.81	
42	2	Marko Štor	Slovenia	10.88	
43	2	Mario Bonello	Malta	10.92	
44	1	Ruslan Rusidze	Georgia	10.96	
45	5	Martin Frick	Liechtenstein	11.04	
	2	Georgios Skender	Cyprus	DNF	

=== Round 2 ===
Qualification: First 4 in each heat (Q) advance to the Semifinals.

Rank	Heat	Name	Nationality	Time	Notes
1	2	Darren Campbell	Great Britain	10.26	Q
1	3	Dwain Chambers	Great Britain	10.26	Q
3	1	Marlon Devonish	Great Britain	10.28	Q
4	3	Marcin Nowak	Poland	10.29	Q, PB
5	4	Haralabos Papadias	Greece	10.31	Q
6	4	Ryszard Pilarczyk	Poland	10.34	Q
7	4	Stefano Tilli	Italy	10.35	Q
8	2	Marcin Krzywański	Poland	10.36	Q
9	2	Miklós Gyulai	Hungary	10.39	Q
9	4	Gábor Dobos	Hungary	10.39	Q
11	1	Geir Moen	Norway	10.40	Q
12	2	David Dolle	Switzerland	10.41	Q
12	4	Anninos Marcoullides	Cyprus	10.41	
12	4	Diego Santos	Spain	10.41	
15	1	Aleksandr Porkhomovskiy	Russia	10.42	Q
16	1	Angelos Pavlakakis	Greece	10.45	Q
17	4	Erlend Sæterstøl	Norway	10.46	
18	2	John Ertzgaard	Norway	10.48	
19	2	Andrea Amici	Italy	10.49	
20	3	Tero Ridanpää	Finland	10.51	Q
20	3	Needy Guims	France	10.51	Q
22	3	Roland Németh	Hungary	10.56	
22	4	Janne Haapasalo	Finland	10.56	
24	1	Anatoliy Dovhal	Ukraine	10.57	
24	1	Mário Barbosa	Portugal	10.57	
24	2	Frédéric Krantz	France	10.57	
27	2	Reşat Oğuz	Turkey	10.58	
28	3	Francesco Scuderi	Italy	10.59	
29	1	Urban Acman	Slovenia	10.60	
30	3	Alexandros Yenovelis	Greece	10.62	
31	3	Yiannis Zisimides	Cyprus	10.68	
	1	Stéphane Cali	France	DNS	

=== Semifinals ===
Qualification: First 4 in each heat (Q) advance to the Final.

Rank	Heat	Name	Nationality	Time	Notes
1	2	Darren Campbell	Great Britain	10.11	Q, PB
2	1	Dwain Chambers	Great Britain	10.15	Q, SB
3	1	Marlon Devonish	Great Britain	10.21	Q, PB
3	2	Haralabos Papadias	Greece	10.21	Q
5	1	Marcin Krzywański	Poland	10.27	Q
5	2	Stefano Tilli	Italy	10.27	Q
7	1	Aleksandr Porkhomovskiy	Russia	10.30	Q, SB
7	2	Marcin Nowak	Poland	10.30	Q
9	1	Ryszard Pilarczyk	Poland	10.35	
9	2	Geir Moen	Norway	10.35	
11	1	David Dolle	Switzerland	10.39	
12	1	Miklós Gyulai	Hungary	10.39	
13	1	Angelos Pavlakakis	Greece	10.43	
14	2	Needy Guims	France	10.50	
15	2	Tero Ridanpää	Finland	10.52	
16	2	Gábor Dobos	Hungary	29.10	

=== Final ===
Rank	Name	Nationality	Time	Notes
1st place, gold medalist(s)	Darren Campbell	Great Britain	10.04	CR
2nd place, silver medalist(s)	Dwain Chambers	Great Britain	10.10	SB
3rd place, bronze medalist(s)	Haralabos Papadias	Greece	10.17	PB
4	Stefano Tilli	Italy	10.20	SB
5	Marlon Devonish	Great Britain	10.24	
6	Aleksandr Porkhomovskiy	Russia	10.29	SB
7	Marcin Krzywański	Poland	10.29	
8	Marcin Nowak	Poland	10.36	
