= 1997 IAAF World Indoor Championships – Men's 200 metres =

The men's 200 metres event at the 1997 IAAF World Indoor Championships was held on March 7–8.

== Medalists ==
Gold	Silver	Bronze
Kevin Little; United States	Iván García; Cuba	Francis Obikwelu; Nigeria

== Results ==
=== Heats ===
First 2 of each heat (Q) and next 6 fastest (q) qualified for the semifinals.

Rank	Heat	Name	Nationality	Time	Notes
1	5	Kevin Little	United States	20.73	Q
2	4	Troy Douglas	Bermuda	20.77	Q, NR
3	1	Rohsaan Griffin	United States	20.85	Q
4	3	Christophe Cheval	France	20.94	Q, PB
5	2	Sebastián Keitel	Chile	20.99	Q
6	2	Ato Boldon	Trinidad and Tobago	20.99	Q
7	3	Francis Obikwelu	Nigeria	21.01	Q
8	4	Erik Wijmeersch	Belgium	21.02	Q
9	1	Iván García	Cuba	21.03	Q
10	4	Gary Ryan	Ireland	21.13	q, NR
10	6	Geir Moen	Norway	21.13	Q
12	2	Angelo Cipolloni	Italy	21.15	q
12	3	Patrick van Balkom	Netherlands	21.15	q
14	5	Ivan Šlehobr	Czech Republic	21.17	Q, NR
15	6	Julian Golding	Great Britain	21.18	q
16	1	Ahmed Douhou	Ivory Coast	21.21	q, NR
17	6	Miklós Gyulai	Hungary	21.29	q
18	1	Prodromos Katsantonis	Cyprus	21.32	
18	5	Gaëtan Bernard	Belgium	21.32	q
20	1	Francisco Navarro	Spain	21.33	
21	4	Marcelo Brivilati da Silva	Brazil	21.50	
22	2	Claudinei da Silva	Brazil	21.58	
23	5	Han Chaoming	China	21.61	
24	3	Koji Ito	Japan	21.68	
25	1	Ioannis Nafpliotis	Greece	21.76	
26	5	Emmanuel Tuffour	Ghana	21.88	
27	4	Douglas Turner	Great Britain	21.90	
28	6	Georgios Panagiotopoulos	Greece	21.97	
29	4	Javier Verme	Peru	21.98	NR
30	3	Neil de Silva	Trinidad and Tobago	22.66	
31	3	Doli Aligbane	Zaire	23.82	
	6	Giovanni Puggioni	Italy	DNF	
	2	Miguel Janssen	Aruba	DNS	
	2	Eric Nkansah	Ghana	DNS	
	6	Carlos Santa	Dominican Republic	DNS	

=== Semifinals ===
First 2 of each semifinal (Q) qualified directly for the final.

Rank	Heat	Name	Nationality	Time	Notes
1	2	Ato Boldon	Trinidad and Tobago	20.41	Q, CR
2	2	Kevin Little	United States	20.46	Q
3	3	Iván García	Cuba	20.48	Q, PB
4	3	Rohsaan Griffin	United States	20.52	Q
5	1	Francis Obikwelu	Nigeria	20.82	Q
6	3	Christophe Cheval	France	20.83	PB
7	1	Troy Douglas	Bermuda	20.89	Q
8	1	Patrick van Balkom	Netherlands	21.08	
9	2	Julian Golding	Great Britain	21.15	
10	1	Sebastián Keitel	Chile	21.17	
11	3	Erik Wijmeersch	Belgium	21.33	
12	1	Ivan Šlehobr	Czech Republic	21.61	
12	2	Gaëtan Bernard	Belgium	21.61	
14	3	Ahmed Douhou	Ivory Coast	21.81	
15	2	Gary Ryan	Ireland	21.84	
16	3	Angelo Cipolloni	Italy	21.87	
17	1	Miklós Gyulai	Hungary	22.13	
	2	Geir Moen	Norway	DNS	

=== Final ===
Rank	Name	Nationality	Time	Notes
1st place, gold medalist(s)	Kevin Little	United States	20.40	CR
2nd place, silver medalist(s)	Iván García	Cuba	20.46	PB
3rd place, bronze medalist(s)	Francis Obikwelu	Nigeria	21.10	
4	Troy Douglas	Bermuda	21.22	
5	Rohsaan Griffin	United States	21.27	
	Ato Boldon	Trinidad and Tobago	DNF	
