= 1997 IAAF World Indoor Championships – Men's 60 metres =

The men's 60 metres event at the 1997 IAAF World Indoor Championships was held on March 7.

== Medalists ==
| Gold | Silver | Bronze |
|---|---|---|
| Charalambos Papadias; Greece | Michael Green; Jamaica | Davidson Ezinwa; Nigeria |

== Results ==
=== Heats ===
The winner of each heat (Q) and next 8 fastest (q) qualified for the semifinals.

| Rank | Heat | Name | Nationality | Time | Notes |
|---|---|---|---|---|---|
| 1 | 3 | Charalambos Papadias | Greece | 6.55 | Q |
| 2 | 4 | Jason Gardener | Great Britain | 6.56 | Q, SB |
| 2 | 7 | Bruny Surin | Canada | 6.56 | Q |
| 4 | 4 | Eric Nkansah | Ghana | 6.58 | q, PB |
| 4 | 5 | Angelos Pavlakakis | Greece | 6.58 | Q, PB |
| 4 | 6 | Raymond Stewart | Jamaica | 6.58 | Q |
| 4 | 7 | Patrik Lövgren | Sweden | 6.58 | q, =NR |
| 4 | 8 | Tim Montgomery | United States | 6.58 | Q |
| 9 | 1 | Davidson Ezinwa | Nigeria | 6.59 | Q |
| 9 | 10 | Deji Aliu | Nigeria | 6.59 | Q |
| 11 | 2 | Kostya Rurak | Ukraine | 6.60 | Q, PB |
| 12 | 2 | Robert Esmie | Canada | 6.61 | q |
| 12 | 9 | Michael Green | Jamaica | 6.61 | Q |
| 14 | 6 | Fernando Ramirez | Norway | 6.63 | q |
| 15 | 3 | Yiannis Zisimides | Cyprus | 6.64 | q |
| 16 | 1 | Renward Wells | Bahamas | 6.65 | q, NR |
| 17 | 4 | Randall Evans | United States | 6.66 | q |
| 18 | 2 | Chen Wenzhong | China | 6.67 | q |
| 18 | 10 | Marc Blume | Germany | 6.67 | |
| 20 | 3 | Stéphane Cali | France | 6.69 | |
| 20 | 5 | Jean-Olivier Zirignon | Ivory Coast | 6.69 | PB |
| 22 | 1 | Jason Livingston | Great Britain | 6.70 | |
| 22 | 9 | André da Silva | Brazil | 6.70 | |
| 24 | 8 | Ibrahim Meité | Ivory Coast | 6.71 | |
| 25 | 8 | Koji Ito | Japan | 6.71 | |
| 26 | 1 | Alex Menal | France | 6.72 | |
| 27 | 5 | Emmanuel Tuffour | Ghana | 6.73 | |
| 27 | 6 | Augustine Nketia | New Zealand | 6.73 | |
| 27 | 9 | Frutos Feo | Spain | 6.73 | |
| 30 | 2 | Giovanni Puggioni | Italy | 6.75 | |
| 30 | 4 | Ivan Šlehobr | Czech Republic | 6.75 | |
| 32 | 10 | Gábor Dobos | Hungary | 6.76 | |
| 33 | 7 | Ivo Krsek | Czech Republic | 6.77 | |
| 34 | 1 | Watson Nyambek | Malaysia | 6.80 | |
| 34 | 7 | Hideki Onohara | Japan | 6.80 | |
| 36 | 2 | Issa-Aimé Nthépé | Cameroon | 6.82 | |
| 36 | 3 | Miklós Gyulai | Hungary | 6.82 | |
| 38 | 6 | José Illán | Spain | 6.84 | |
| 39 | 6 | Jorge Polanco | Argentina | 6.85 | |
| 40 | 10 | Dinçer Ersoy | Turkey | 6.86 | |
| 41 | 4 | Miguel Janssen | Aruba | 6.87 | |
| 42 | 6 | Patrick Mocci-Raoumbé | Gabon | 6.88 | |
| 42 | 10 | Arnaldo Silva | Brazil | 6.88 | |
| 42 | 10 | Peter Pulu | Papua New Guinea | 6.88 | |
| 45 | 3 | Hamed Habib | Kuwait | 6.92 | |
| 46 | 2 | Pascal Dangbo | Benin | 6.94 | |
| 47 | 7 | Theodore Haba | Guinea | 6.95 | |
| 47 | 8 | Francis Keita | Sierra Leone | 6.95 | |
| 49 | 5 | Gabriel Simón | Argentina | 6.96 | |
| 50 | 8 | Mario Bonello | Malta | 6.97 | NR |
| 51 | 9 | Valentin Ngbogo | Central African Republic | 7.04 | |
| | 8 | Kouty Mawenh | Liberia | DNF | |
| | 9 | Ousmane Diarra | Mali | DNF | |
| | 1 | Norberto Nsue Ondo | Equatorial Guinea | DNS | |
| | 5 | Ato Boldon | Trinidad and Tobago | DNS | |

=== Semifinals ===
First 2 of each semifinal (Q) qualified directly for the final.

| Rank | Heat | Name | Nationality | Time | Notes |
|---|---|---|---|---|---|
| 1 | 3 | Bruny Surin | Canada | 6.50 | Q, SB |
| 2 | 3 | Michael Green | Jamaica | 6.50 | Q |
| 3 | 1 | Charalambos Papadias | Greece | 6.53 | Q |
| 4 | 1 | Raymond Stewart | Jamaica | 6.54 | Q |
| 5 | 1 | Robert Esmie | Canada | 6.54 | PB |
| 6 | 1 | Eric Nkansah | Ghana | 6.57 | PB |
| 6 | 2 | Davidson Ezinwa | Nigeria | 6.57 | Q |
| 6 | 3 | Tim Montgomery | United States | 6.57 | |
| 9 | 2 | Patrik Lövgren | Sweden | 6.58 | Q, =NR |
| 10 | 2 | Angelos Pavlakakis | Greece | 6.61 | |
| 11 | 2 | Jason Gardener | Great Britain | 6.62 | |
| 12 | 2 | Randall Evans | United States | 6.63 | |
| 13 | 3 | Kostya Rurak | Ukraine | 6.65 | |
| 14 | 3 | Renward Wells | Bahamas | 6.65 | =NR |
| 15 | 1 | Chen Wenzhong | China | 6.67 | |
| 16 | 3 | Yiannis Zisimides | Cyprus | 6.73 | |
| 17 | 2 | Fernando Ramirez | Norway | 6.74 | |
| | 1 | Deji Aliu | Nigeria | DQ | |

=== Final ===
| Rank | Lane | Name | Nationality | Time | Notes |
|---|---|---|---|---|---|
| 1st place, gold medalist(s) | 5 | Charalambos Papadias | Greece | 6.50 | NR |
| 2nd place, silver medalist(s) | 2 | Michael Green | Jamaica | 6.51 | |
| 3rd place, bronze medalist(s) | 4 | Davidson Ezinwa | Nigeria | 6.52 | PB |
| 4 | 1 | Raymond Stewart | Jamaica | 6.55 | |
| 5 | 3 | Bruny Surin | Canada | 6.57 | |
| 6 | 6 | Patrik Lövgren | Sweden | 6.61 | |
