= 1998 European Athletics Championships – Men's 4 × 100 metres relay =

Men's 4 × 100 metres relay at the European Athletics Championships

The men's 4 × 100 metres relay at the 1998 European Athletics Championships was held at the Népstadion on 22 August.

== Medalists ==
| Gold | Allyn Condon; Darren Campbell; Douglas Walker; Julian Golding; Great Britain |
| Silver | Thierry Lubin; Frédéric Krantz; Christophe Cheval; Needy Guims; France |
| Bronze | Marcin Krzywański; Marcin Nowak; Piotr Balcerzak; Ryszard Pilarczyk; Poland |

== Results ==
| KEY: | q | Fastest non-qualifiers | Q | Qualified | NR | National record | PB | Personal best | SB | Seasonal best |

=== Heats ===
Qualification: First 3 in each heat (Q) and the next 2 fastest (q) advance to the Final.

| Rank | Heat | Nation | Athlete | Time | Notes |
|---|---|---|---|---|---|
| 1 | 1 | Great Britain | Allyn Condon, Darren Campbell, Marlon Devonish, Dwain Chambers | 38.47 | Q, SB |
| 2 | 1 | Poland | Marcin Krzywański, Marcin Nowak, Piotr Balcerzak, Ryszard Pilarczyk | 39.16 | Q, SB |
| 3 | 1 | France | Rodrigue Nordin, Frédéric Krantz, Christophe Cheval, Needy Guims | 39.21 | Q |
| 4 | 2 | Germany | Patrick Schneider, Jerome Crews, Manuel Milde, Marc Blume | 39.25 | Q |
| 5 | 2 | Greece | Alexandros Yenovelis, Alexios Alexopoulos, Georgios Panagiotopoulos, Haralabos Papadias | 39.27 | Q |
| 6 | 1 | Netherlands | Martijn Ungerer, Patrick Snoek, Patrick van Balkom, Dennis Tilburg | 39.29 | q, NR |
| 7 | 2 | Italy | Andrea Amici, Alessandro Attene, Sandro Floris, Stefano Tilli | 39.30 | Q |
| 8 | 2 | Sweden | Patrik Lövgren, Matias Ghansah, Torbjörn Eriksson, Peter Karlsson | 39.44 | q |
| 9 | 1 | Norway | Erlend Sæterstøl, Thomas Mellin-Olsen, John Ertzgaard, Geir Moen | 39.77 | SB |
| 10 | 2 | Czech Republic | Martin Morkes, Ludvík Bohman, Tomas Drimal, Ivo Krsek | 39.76 | |
| 11 | 2 | Slovenia | Damjan Spur, Martin Plesnicar, Boštjan Horvat, Urban Acman | 39.86 | |
| 12 | 2 | Cyprus | Evripides Demosthenous, Anninos Marcoullides, Prodromos Katsantonis, Yiannis Zisimides | 40.96 | |
| | 1 | Spain | Frutos Feo, Javier Navarro, Diego Santos, Carlos Berlanga | DNF | |
| | 2 | Hungary | Roland Németh, Miklós Gyulai, Gyorgy Dobos, Gábor Dobos | DNF | |
| | 1 | Finland | Sami Länsivuori, Tero Ridanpää, Harri Kivelä, Janne Haapasalo | DQ | |

=== Final ===
| Rank | Nation | Athletes | Time | Notes |
|---|---|---|---|---|
| 1st place, gold medalist(s) | Great Britain | Allyn Condon, Darren Campbell, Douglas Walker, Julian Golding | 38.52 | |
| 2nd place, silver medalist(s) | France | Thierry Lubin, Frédéric Krantz, Christophe Cheval, Needy Guims | 38.87 | SB |
| 3rd place, bronze medalist(s) | Poland | Marcin Krzywański, Marcin Nowak, Piotr Balcerzak, Ryszard Pilarczyk | 38.98 | SB |
| 4 | Greece | Alexandros Yenovelis, Alexios Alexopoulos, Georgios Panagiotopoulos, Haralabos Papadias | 39.07 | |
| 5 | Germany | Patrick Schneider, Jerome Crews, Manuel Milde, Marc Blume | 39.09 | SB |
| 6 | Sweden | Patrik Lövgren, Matias Ghansah, Torbjörn Eriksson, Peter Karlsson | 39.32 | SB |
| 7 | Netherlands | Martijn Ungerer, Patrick Snoek, Patrick van Balkom, Dennis Tilburg | 39.79 | |
| 8 | Italy | Francesco Scuderi, Andrea Colombo, Alessandro Attene, Sandro Floris | 39.85 | |
