= 1998 European Athletics Indoor Championships – Men's 60 metres =

The men's 60 metres event at the 1998 European Athletics Indoor Championships was held 27–28 February.

== Medalists ==
| Gold | Silver | Bronze |
|---|---|---|
| Angelos Pavlakakis; Greece | Jason Gardener; Great Britain | Stéphane Cali; France |

== Results ==
=== Heats ===
First 2 from each heat (Q) and the next 6 fastest (q) qualified for the semifinals.

| Rank | Heat | Name | Nationality | Time | Notes |
|---|---|---|---|---|---|
| 1 | 5 | Angelos Pavlakakis | Greece | 6.55 | Q |
| 2 | 4 | Marcin Krzywański | Poland | 6.56 | Q |
| 3 | 2 | Ryszard Pilarczyk | Poland | 6.59 | Q, PB |
| 4 | 1 | Stéphane Cali | France | 6.60 | Q |
| 4 | 4 | Francesco Scuderi | Italy | 6.60 | Q |
| 6 | 2 | Jason Gardener | Great Britain | 6.62 | Q |
| 6 | 4 | Fernando Ramirez | Norway | 6.62 | q |
| 8 | 1 | Dwain Chambers | Great Britain | 6.64 | Q |
| 8 | 4 | Georgios Theodoridis | Greece | 6.64 | q |
| 10 | 1 | Andrea Amici | Italy | 6.65 | q |
| 10 | 2 | Patrick Lövgren | Sweden | 6.65 | q |
| 12 | 1 | Frutos Feo | Spain | 6.67 | q |
| 12 | 3 | Darren Braithwaite | Great Britain | 6.67 | Q |
| 14 | 2 | Gábor Dobos | Hungary | 6.68 | q |
| 15 | 1 | Patrick Schneider | Germany | 6.69 | |
| 15 | 3 | Andreas Koch | Germany | 6.69 | Q |
| 17 | 1 | Peter Karlsson | Sweden | 6.70 | |
| 17 | 5 | Needy Guims | France | 6.70 | Q |
| 19 | 3 | Haralabos Papadias | Greece | 6.71 | |
| 19 | 4 | Dennis Tilburg | Netherlands | 6.71 | |
| 21 | 4 | Gabriel Burtea | Romania | 6.72 | |
| 22 | 5 | Daniel Cojocaru | Romania | 6.73 | |
| 23 | 5 | Miklós Gyulai | Hungary | 6.74 | |
| 24 | 3 | Diego Moisés Santos | Spain | 6.75 | |
| 24 | 5 | Sergey Kornelyuk | Belarus | 6.75 | |
| 26 | 2 | Mário Barbosa | Portugal | 6.76 | |
| 27 | 3 | Radoslav Paskalev | Bulgaria | 6.77 | |
| 28 | 2 | Alex Menal | France | 6.79 | |
| 29 | 3 | Kevin Widmer | Switzerland | 6.80 | |
| 29 | 5 | John Ertzgaard | Norway | 6.80 | |
| 31 | 3 | Tommy Kafri | Israel | 6.81 | |
| 32 | 1 | Ruslan Rusidze | Georgia | 6.83 | |
| 32 | 4 | Reşat Oğuz | Turkey | 6.83 | |
| 34 | 2 | Stéphane Diriwächter | Switzerland | 6.84 | |
| 35 | 5 | Venancio José | Spain | 6.86 | |
| 36 | 3 | Mario Bonello | Malta | 6.90 | |

=== Semifinals ===
First 4 from each semifinal qualified directly (Q) for the final.

| Rank | Heat | Name | Nationality | Time | Notes |
|---|---|---|---|---|---|
| 1 | 2 | Marcin Krzywański | Poland | 6.53 | Q |
| 2 | 1 | Angelos Pavlakakis | Greece | 6.58 | Q |
| 2 | 2 | Stéphane Cali | France | 6.58 | Q |
| 4 | 1 | Ryszard Pilarczyk | Poland | 6.62 | Q |
| 5 | 1 | Jason Gardener | Great Britain | 6.63 | Q |
| 6 | 2 | Georgios Theodoridis | Greece | 6.65 | Q |
| 7 | 2 | Andrea Amici | Italy | 6.65 | Q |
| 8 | 2 | Dwain Chambers | Great Britain | 6.66 | |
| 9 | 2 | Gábor Dobos | Hungary | 6.67 | |
| 10 | 2 | Darren Braithwaite | Great Britain | 6.68 | |
| 11 | 1 | Patrick Lövgren | Sweden | 6.69 | Q |
| 12 | 1 | Fernando Ramirez | Norway | 6.70 | |
| 13 | 1 | Frutos Feo | Spain | 6.72 | |
| 14 | 1 | Francesco Scuderi | Italy | 6.72 | |
| 15 | 1 | Needy Guims | France | 6.72 | |
| 16 | 2 | Andreas Koch | Germany | 6.73 | |

=== Final ===
| Rank | Lane | Name | Nationality | Time | Notes |
|---|---|---|---|---|---|
| 1st place, gold medalist(s) | 5 | Angelos Pavlakakis | Greece | 6.55 | |
| 2nd place, silver medalist(s) | 8 | Jason Gardener | Great Britain | 6.59 | |
| 3rd place, bronze medalist(s) | 3 | Stéphane Cali | France | 6.60 | |
| 4 | 4 | Marcin Krzywański | Poland | 6.61 | |
| 5 | 6 | Ryszard Pilarczyk | Poland | 6.64 | |
| 6 | 2 | Georgios Theodoridis | Greece | 6.68 | |
| 7 | 1 | Andrea Amici | Italy | 6.70 | |
| 8 | 8 | Patrick Lövgren | Sweden | 6.71 | |
