= 1995 IAAF World Indoor Championships – Men's 60 metres =

The men's 60 metres event at the 1995 IAAF World Indoor Championships was held on 10 March.

== Medalists ==
Gold	Silver	Bronze
Bruny Surin; Canada	Darren Braithwaite; Great Britain	Robert Esmie; Canada

== Results ==
=== Heats ===
First 2 of each heat (Q) and next 10 fastest (q) qualified for the semifinals.

Rank	Heat	Name	Nationality	Time	Notes
1	3	Darren Braithwaite	Great Britain	6.54	Q
2	2	Bruny Surin	Canada	6.59	Q
2	3	Gus Nketia	New Zealand	6.59	Q
4	5	Robert Esmie	Canada	6.60	Q
5	7	Sebastien Carrat	France	6.63	Q
6	1	Stefano Tilli	Italy	6.64	Q
6	4	Alexandros Yenovelis	Greece	6.64	Q
6	6	Patrik Strenius	Sweden	6.64	Q
9	1	Ibrahim Meité	Ivory Coast	6.66	Q
9	5	Marc Blume	Germany	6.66	Q
9	6	Daniel Cojocaru	Romania	6.66	Q
12	3	Yiannis Zisimides	Cyprus	6.67	q
13	2	Yoshitaka Ito	Japan	6.68	Q
13	7	Michael Rosswess	Great Britain	6.68	Q
15	7	Maurice Greene	United States	6.69	q
16	2	Vince Henderson	United States	6.71	q
16	6	Andrey Grigoryev	Russia	6.71	q
18	2	Lars Hedner	Sweden	6.72	q
19	1	Abdolsadeh Gorgani	Iran	6.73	q
19	5	Fernando Ramirez	Norway	6.73	q
21	4	Vitaliy Savin	Kazakhstan	6.74	Q
22	3	Miguel Janssen	Aruba	6.75	q
23	5	Needy Guims	France	6.77	q
24	1	Yuriy Mizera	Russia	6.78	q
24	2	Issa-Aimé Nthépé	Cameroon	6.78	
24	6	Luis Cunha	Portugal	6.78	
27	3	Peter Pulu	Papua New Guinea	6.79	NR
28	3	Franck Amégnigan	Togo	6.79	
29	2	Frank Perri	Netherlands	6.82	
29	3	Sanusi Turay	Sierra Leone	6.82	
29	4	Kennet Kjensli	Norway	6.82	
32	4	Holger Blume	Germany	6.86	
32	4	Nicolas Alloke	Ivory Coast	6.86	
32	5	Vitaly Medvedev	Kazakhstan	6.86	
35	5	Haroun Korjie	Sierra Leone	6.87	
36	7	Robinson Urrutia	Colombia	6.89	
37	6	Valentin Ngbogo	Central African Republic	6.91	
38	1	Carlos Villaseñor	Mexico	6.93	
39	1	Damien Marsh	Australia	6.94	
40	4	Marco Belizaire	Panama	6.95	
41	2	Khalid Juma	Bahrain	6.97	
42	6	Abbas Salmanov	Azerbaijan	7.06	
43	7	Robert Chircop	Malta	7.07	
44	4	Branislav Jajčanin	Bosnia and Herzegovina	7.12	
45	7	Biliaminou Alao	Benin	7.17	
46	5	Philippe Bejjani	Lebanon	7.26	
47	6	Guillermo Saucedo	Bolivia	7.27	
48	7	Robert Tupuhoe	French Polynesia	7.28	
49	7	Hassane Illiassou	Niger	7.49	
50	5	Cecil Koehling	Honduras	7.59	
	1	Mahama Mabene	Equatorial Guinea	DQ	R162.7
	3	Geoffrey Walusimbi	Uganda	DQ	R162.7
	1	Felix Andam	Ghana	DNS	
	4	Michael Green	Jamaica	DNS	

=== Semifinals ===
First 2 of each semifinal (Q) and the next 2 fastest (q) qualified for the final.

Rank	Heat	Name	Nationality	Time	Notes
1	1	Bruny Surin	Canada	6.51	Q
2	3	Darren Braithwaite	Great Britain	6.57	Q
3	2	Robert Esmie	Canada	6.58	Q
4	1	Gus Nketia	New Zealand	6.60	Q
4	3	Vitaliy Savin	Kazakhstan	6.60	Q
6	3	Patrik Strenius	Sweden	6.61	q
7	1	Michael Rosswess	Great Britain	6.62	
7	1	Stefano Tilli	Italy	6.62	
7	2	Maurice Greene	United States	6.62	Q
7	2	Marc Blume	Germany	6.62	q
11	1	Vince Henderson	United States	6.63	
11	2	Ibrahim Meité	Ivory Coast	6.63	
13	1	Andrey Grigoryev	Russia	6.68	
13	3	Alexandros Yenovelis	Greece	6.68	
15	2	Sebastien Carrat	France	6.69	
15	3	Yoshitaka Ito	Japan	6.69	
17	2	Lars Hedner	Sweden	6.70	
18	2	Yiannis Zisimides	Cyprus	6.71	
19	3	Abdolsadeh Gorgani	Iran	6.73	
20	1	Daniel Cojocaru	Romania	6.78	
20	3	Needy Guims	France	6.78	
22	1	Fernando Ramirez	Norway	6.79	
23	2	Miguel Janssen	Aruba	6.83	
24	3	Yuriy Mizera	Russia	6.89	

=== Final ===
Rank	Lane	Name	Nationality	Time	Notes
1st place, gold medalist(s)	4	Bruny Surin	Canada	6.46	CR
2nd place, silver medalist(s)	5	Darren Braithwaite	Great Britain	6.51	
3rd place, bronze medalist(s)	6	Robert Esmie	Canada	6.55	
4	1	Maurice Greene	United States	6.59	
5	7	Marc Blume	Germany	6.59	
6	3	Gus Nketia	New Zealand	6.63	
7	8	Patrik Strenius	Sweden	6.64	
8	2	Vitaliy Savin	Kazakhstan	6.65	
