= 1996 European Athletics Indoor Championships – Men's 60 metres =

The men's 60 metres event at the 1996 European Athletics Indoor Championships was held in Stockholm Globe Arena on 8–9 March.

== Medalists ==
Gold	Silver	Bronze
Marc Blume; Germany	Jason John; Great Britain	Peter Karlsson; Sweden

== Results ==
=== Heats ===
First 2 from each heat (Q) and the next 2 fastest (q) qualified for the semifinals.

Rank	Heat	Name	Nationality	Time	Notes
1	4	Peter Karlsson	Sweden	6.61	Q
2	3	Patrik Strenius	Sweden	6.63	Q
3	4	Yiannios Zisimides	Cyprus	6.69	Q
4	2	Marc Blume	Germany	6.70	Q
5	3	Stefano Tilli	Italy	6.71	Q
6	1	Haralabos Papadias	Greece	6.72	Q
6	2	Kevin Williams	Great Britain	6.72	Q
6	3	Fernando Ramirez	Norway	6.72	q
6	5	Jason John	Great Britain	6.72	Q
10	2	Alexandros Yenovelis	Greece	6.73	
11	1	Harri Kivelä	Finland	6.74	Q
11	4	Andrey Fedoriv	Russia	6.74	
13	4	David Patros	France	6.75	
14	5	Aleksandr Streltsov	Ukraine	6.76	Q
14	5	Jörg Deerberg	Germany	6.76	Q
16	3	Stéphane Cali	France	6.77	
17	2	Erlend Sæterstøl	Norway	6.78	
17	1	Jason Gardener	Great Britain	6.79	
18	1	Luca Levorato	Italy	6.80	
18	1	Pavel Galkin	Russia	6.80	
18	2	Mario Longo	Italy	6.80	
21	5	Ivo Krsek	Czech Republic	6.81	
22	4	Sergejs Inšakovs	Latvia	6.82	
23	3	Anninos Marcoullides	Cyprus	6.85	
24	5	Reşat Oğuz	Turkey	7.00	
25	4	Robert Chircop	Malta	7.13	
26	3	Christian Forcellini	San Marino	7.24	
27	2	Jason Muscat	Malta	7.36	

=== Semifinals ===
First 3 from each semifinal qualified directly (Q) for the final.

Rank	Heat	Name	Nationality	Time	Notes
1	2	Marc Blume	Germany	6.62	Q
2	2	Peter Karlsson	Sweden	6.64	Q
3	1	Patrik Strenius	Sweden	6.65	Q
4	1	Haralabos Papadias	Greece	6.68	Q
5	1	Kevin Williams	Great Britain	6.69	Q
5	1	Yiannios Zisimides	Cyprus	6.69	
5	2	Jason John	Great Britain	6.69	Q
8	2	Stefano Tilli	Italy	6.70	
9	1	Jörg Deerberg	Germany	6.75	
10	2	Harri Kivelä	Finland	6.78	
11	1	Fernando Ramirez	Norway	6.79	
12	2	Aleksandr Streltsov	Ukraine	6.94	

=== Final ===
Rank	Name	Nationality	Time	Notes
1st place, gold medalist(s)	Marc Blume	Germany	6.62	
2nd place, silver medalist(s)	Jason John	Great Britain	6.64	
3rd place, bronze medalist(s)	Peter Karlsson	Sweden	6.64	
4	Haralabos Papadias	Greece	6.65	
5	Patrik Strenius	Sweden	6.67	
6	Kevin Williams	Great Britain	6.72	
