= Marcin Krzywański =

Polish sprinter (born 1975)

Krzywański Marcin
Personal information
- Nationality: Polish
- Born: 29 July 1975 (age 51)
- Height: 1.85 m (6 ft 1 in)
- Weight: 74 kg (163 lb)

Sport
- Sport: Athletics
- Event: 100 m
Medal record
Men's athletics
Representing Poland
European Championships
Bronze medal – third place	1998 Budapest	4x100 m

Marcin Krzywański (born 29 August 1975) is a retired Polish athlete who specialised in sprinting events. He won a bronze medal in the 4 × 100 metres relay at the 1998 European Championships.

== Competition record ==
Year	Competition	Venue	Position	Event	Notes
Representing Poland
1993	European Junior Championships	San Sebastián, Spain	11th (sf)	100 m	10.76
1993	European Junior Championships	San Sebastián, Spain	7th	200 m	21.52 (w)
1994	World Junior Championships	Lisbon, Portugal	9th (sf)	100 m	10.55 (wind: +1.1 m/s)
1994	World Junior Championships	Lisbon, Portugal	18th (qf)	200 m	21.50 (wind: +1.4 m/s)
1997	European U23 Championships	Turku, Finland	7th	100 m	10.57 w (wind: +2.8 m/s)
1997	European U23 Championships	Turku, Finland	2nd	4 × 100 m relay	39.27
1997	World Championships	Athens, Greece	28th (qf)	100 m	10.33
1997	World Championships	Athens, Greece	10th (sf)	4 × 100 m relay	38.79
1997	Universiade	Catania, Italy	15th (sf)	100 m	10.58
1997	Universiade	Catania, Italy	4th	4 × 100 m relay	39.39
1998	European Indoor Championships	Valencia, Spain	4th	60 m	6.61
1998	European Championships	Budapest, Hungary	7th	100 m	10.29
1998	European Championships	Budapest, Hungary	3rd	4 × 100 m relay	38.98
1999	World Championships	Seville, Spain	5th	4 × 100 m relay	38.70
2000	European Indoor Championships	Ghent, Belgium	8th (sf)	60 m	6.66
2001	World Indoor Championships	Lisbon, Portugal	19th (sf)	60 m	6.73
2003	World Championships	Paris, France	3rd (sf)	4 × 100 m relay	38.50

== Personal bests ==
Outdoors

- 100m 10.23 (1998)
- 200m 21.11 (+0.6 m/s) (Łódź 2001)

Indoors

- 60m 6.53 (Valencia 1998)
