= Patrik Lövgren =

Swedish sprinter

Sven Patrik Lövgren (born 12 October 1975 in Malmö) is a retired Swedish athlete who specialised in sprinting events. He enjoyed most success in the indoor 60 metres, making the final at several major championships. With 6.58, he was the joint Swedish record holder in that event, together with Peter Karlsson.

Sven Patrik Lövgren is the son of the successful athletes Sven-Åke Lövgren and Margareta Lövgren.

== Competition record ==
Year	Competition	Venue	Position	Event	Notes
Representing Sweden
1994	European Indoor Championships	Paris, France	14th (h)	60 m	6.78
1997	World Indoor Championships	Paris, France	6th	60 m	6.61
1997	European U23 Championships	Turku, Finland	5th	100 m	10.42 w (wind: +2.8 m/s)
1997	World Championships	Athens, Greece	12th (h)	4 × 100 m relay	39.04
1998	European Indoor Championships	Valencia, Spain	8th	60 m	6.71
1998	European Championships	Budapest, Hungary	6th	4 × 100 m relay	39.32
2000	European Indoor Championships	Ghent, Belgium	9th (sf)	60 m	6.67
2002	European Indoor Championships	Valencia, Spain	6th	60 m	6.70
2002	European Championships	Munich, Germany	12th (h)	4 × 100 m relay	39.99

== Personal bests ==
Outdoors

- 100 meters – 10.26 (+1.4 m/s) (Jönköping 2002)
- 200 meters – 21.15 (+1.0 m/s) (Halmstad 1999)

Indoors

- 60 meters – 6.58 (Paris 1997) NR
