= Yoshitaka Ito =

Japanese sprinter (born 1970)

Personal information
- Born: 23 June 1970 (age 56) Japan

Sport
- Sport: Track and field
- Event: 100 metres
Medal record
Men's athletics
Representing Japan
Asian Championships
Silver medal – second place	1993 Manila	4×100 m
Silver medal – second place	1995 Jakarta	4×400 m
Bronze medal – third place	1995 Jakarta	100 m

Yoshitaka Ito (伊藤 喜剛, Itō Yoshitaka; born 23 June 1970) is a retired Japanese athlete who specialised in sprinting events. He represented his country at the 1995 World Championships in Athletics. He won a gold medal at the 1994 Asian Games in the 4 × 100 m relay, while his best individual success was winning bronze at the 1995 Asian Athletics Championships in the 100 m.

== Competition record ==
Year	Competition	Venue	Position	Event	Notes
Representing Japan
1994	Asian Games	Hiroshima, Japan	1st	4 × 100 m relay	39.37
1994	Asian Games	Hiroshima, Japan	–	200 metres	20.70
1995	Asian Championships	Jakarta, Indonesia	3rd	100 m	10.45
1995	Japanese Championships	Tokyo, Japan	1st	100 m	10.22
1995	Japanese National Games	Fukushima, Japan	1st	100 m	10.55
1995	World Championships	Gothenburg, Sweden	34th (sf)	100 m	10.48
1995	World Championships	Gothenburg, Sweden	5th	4×100 m relay	39.33
1995	World Indoor Championships	Barcelona, Spain	15th (sf)	60 m	6.69

== Personal bests ==
Outdoor

- 100 metres – 10.22 (+0.6 m/s, Tokyo 1995)
- 200 metres – 20.70 (+1.7 m/s, Hiroshima 1994)

Indoor

- 60 metres – 6.69 (Barcelona 1995)
