= Miklós Gyulai =

Hungarian sprinter and bobsledder

Personal information
- Nationality: Hungarian
- Born: 29 December 1970 (age 55) Budapest, Hungary

Sport
- Sport: Sprinting
- Event: 4 × 100 metres relay

Miklós Gyulai (born 29 December 1970) is a Hungarian sprinter. He competed in the men's 4 × 100 metres relay at the 2000 Summer Olympics. He also competed in the two-man bobsleigh at the 1994 Winter Olympics.

== Sporting career ==
=== Track and field ===
==== Personal best ====
Event	Result	Venue	Date
Outdoor
100 m	10.29 (wind: +2.0 m/s)	(Greece) Athens	17 June 1998
200 m	20.67 (wind: +0.6 m/s)	(Hungary) Budapest	12 July 1998
Indoor
60 m	6.58	(Hungary) Budapest	16 January 1999
200 m	20.85	(Hungary) Budapest	6 February 1998

==== Achievements ====
Year	Competition	Venue	Position	Event	Notes
Representing Hungary
1992	European Athletics U23 Cup Division B	Villeneuve-d'Ascq, France	1st	4 x 400 m	3:10.55
1995	Summer Universiade	Fukuoka, Japan	35th (qf)	200 m	22.06
1995	Summer Universiade	Fukuoka, Japan	-	400 m	DNF
1995	Summer Universiade	Fukuoka, Japan	11th (h)	4 × 400 m	3:09.59
1997	World Indoor Championships	Paris, France	36th (h)	60 m	6.82
1997	World Indoor Championships	Paris, France	17th (sf)	200 m	22.13
1997	World Championships	Athens, Greece	18th (h)	4 × 400 m	39.38
1998	European Indoor Championships	Valencia, Spain	23rd (h)	60 m	6.74
1998	European Indoor Championships	Valencia, Spain	12th (sf)	200 m	21.49
1998	European Championships	Budapest, Hungary	12th (sf)	100 m	10.39
1998	European Championships	Budapest, Hungary	-	4 x 100 m	DNF
1999	World Championships	Seville, Spain	7th	4 x 100 m	38.71*
2000	Olympic Games	Sydney, Australia	21st (h)	4 x 100 m	39.52
2003	World Championships	Paris, France	-	4 x 100 m	DQ

* In heat (he did not participated in the final)

=== Bobsleigh ===
==== Olympic Games ====
Event	Two-man	Four-man
Representing Hungary
(Norway) 1994 Lillehammer	28th	-

== See also ==
- List of athletes who competed in both the Summer and Winter Olympic games
