= Todd Gallagher =

American writer

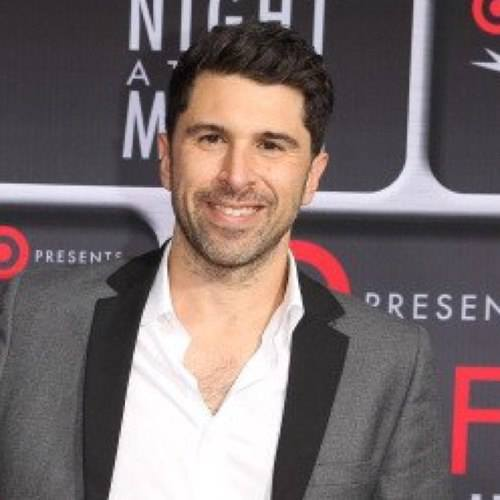
- Born: Todd John Gallagher
- Occupations: director, author, producer

Todd Gallagher is an American comedy writer, performance artist, and director. He has worked with ESPN and is known for his book, Andy Roddick Beat Me With a Frying Pan: Taking the Field with Pro Athletes and Olympic Legends to Answer Sports' Fans Burning Questions.

== Early life ==
Gallagher was raised in Jeannette, Pennsylvania. At the age of 16 he won the grand prize twice on the ESPN quiz show, Dream League.

== Career ==
=== Early career ===
At age 21 he became the youngest coach and Director of Player Personnel in the history of pro basketball for the United States Basketball League's New Hampshire Thunder Loons. His basketball experience led to a series of writing assignments in Australia. He then returned to the United States where he wrote for ESPN, conducting interviews with people throughout the sports and entertainment world, including Ice Cube. As a television writer and producer he has sold, developed, and run various shows including creating "Shaq vs."

=== Andy Roddick Beat Me with a Frying Pan ===
Andy Roddick Beat Me with a Frying Pan: Taking the Field with Pro Athletes and Olympic Legends to Answer Sports Fans' Burning Questions (Random House, 2007), Gallagher's first book humorously answers some outlandish questions about sports, such as "Could a morbidly obese goalie shut out an NHL team?" (Chapter 1). A number of professional athletes including Andy Roddick, Maurice Greene, and the NHL's Washington Capitals, participated in live events for the project. The book was described by the New York Times as "a weird amalgam of serious inside-the-ropes research germane to the games and of ludicrous just-outside-the-asylum performance art."

=== Playground Challenge ===
His "Phelps Challenge," where he challenged Michael Phelps on ESPN radio to a $50,000 bet that he could beat him in any event outside of the pool, was turned into the "Playground Challenge" by ESPN. In it, he takes on pro and Olympic athletes in playground events.

=== God Only Knows ===
In 2009 Gallagher enrolled in a Pittsburgh high school as a student for a feature film. He took classes and trained with the school's soccer team. The film about his experience entitled "God Only Knows" features Taylor Swift.
