= Peter Karlsson (athlete) =

Swedish sprinter

Personal information
- National team: Sweden
- Citizenship: Sweden
- Born: November 23, 1970 (age 55) Gothenburg, Sweden

Sport
- Country: Sweden
- Sport: track and field athletics

Peter Karlsson (born 23 November 1970 in Gothenburg) is a retired Swedish athlete who competed in the sprinting events. He is best known for winning the bronze medal in the 60 metres at the 1996 European Indoor Championships in his native Sweden. In addition, he competed at the 1996 Summer Olympics, as well as 1995 and 1997 World Championships. He was the Swedish record holder in the 100 meter dash with 10.18, as well as co-holder of the indoor 60 meter record of 6.58, together with Patrik Lövgren.

In 1996, Peter ran 100 meter in 9.98 although with a tailwind of 4.0 m/s, which is beyond the legal limit of 2.0 m/s.

== Competition record ==
Year	Competition	Venue	Position	Event	Notes
Representing Sweden
1994	European Championships	Helsinki, Finland	7th (sf)	100 m	10.41 (wind: +1.7 m/s)
1994	European Championships	Helsinki, Finland	4th	4 × 100 m relay	39.05
1995	World Championships	Gothenburg, Sweden	25th (qf)	100 m	10.39
1995	World Championships	Gothenburg, Sweden	9th (sf)	4 × 100 m relay	38.78
1996	European Indoor Championships	Stockholm, Sweden	3rd	60 m	6.64
1996	Olympic Games	Atlanta, United States	17th (qf)	100 m	10.24
1996	Olympic Games	Atlanta, United States	5th	4 × 100 m relay	38.67
1997	World Championships	Athens, Greece	40th (qf)	100 m	10.40
1997	World Championships	Athens, Greece	12th (sf)	4 × 100 m relay	39.04
1998	European Indoor Championships	Valencia, Spain	17th (h)	60 m	6.70
1998	European Championships	Budapest, Hungary	6th	4 × 100 m relay	39.32

== Personal bests ==
Outdoor

- 100 metres – 10.18 (0.0 m/s) (Cottbus 1996) NR
- 200 metres – 21.31 (+2.0 m/s) (Stockholm 1993)

Indoor

- 60 metres – 6.58 (Gent 1996) NR
