= Patrik Strenius =

Swedish sprinter

Personal information
- Born: March 6, 1972 (age 54) Karlskrona, Blekinge, Sweden
- Height: 174 cm (5 ft 9 in)

Sport
- Sport: Sprinting

Patrik Sten Ola Strenius (born 6 March 1972) is a retired Swedish athlete who competed in the sprinting events. He represented his country at the 1996 Summer Olympics in the 4 × 100 metres relay where Sweden finished fifth in the final, having set the national record in the semifinals. In addition, he reached the finals at the 1995 World Indoor Championships and 1996 European Indoor Championships.

== Competition record ==
Year	Competition	Venue	Position	Event	Notes
Representing Sweden
1995	World Indoor Championships	Barcelona, Spain	7th	60 m	6.64
1996	European Indoor Championships	Stockholm, Sweden	5th	60 m	6.67
1996	Olympic Games	Atlanta, United States	49th (h)	100 m	10.48
1996	Olympic Games	Atlanta, United States	5th	4 × 100 m relay	38.67

== Personal bests ==
Outdoor

- 100 metres – 10.21 (+1.3 m/s) (Madrid 1996)
- 200 metres – 21.01 (0.0 m/s) (Malmö 1996)

Indoor

- 60 metres – 6.61 (Barcelona 1995)
