= Martin Bohman =

Czech bobsledder (born 1980)

Martin Bohman (born 5 April 1980 in Prague) is a Czech bobsledder who has competed since 2006. He finished 16th in the four-man event at the 2010 Winter Olympics in Vancouver.

Bohman finished 14th in the four-man event at the FIBT World Championships 2009 in Lake Placid, New York.

His father is sprinter Luděk Bohman and his brother sprinter Ludvík Bohman.
