= 1997 European Athletics U23 Championships – Men's 200 metres =

The men's 200 metres event at the 1997 European Athletics U23 Championships was held in Turku, Finland, on 11, 12, and 13 July 1997.

== Medalists ==
Gold	Julian Golding; Great Britain
Silver	Alessandro Attene; Italy
Bronze	Ryszard Pilarczyk; Poland

== Results ==
=== Final ===
13 July
Wind: 0.3 m/s

Rank	Name	Nationality	Time	Notes
1st place, gold medalist(s)	Julian Golding	Great Britain	20.46	
2nd place, silver medalist(s)	Alessandro Attene	Italy	20.68	
3rd place, bronze medalist(s)	Ryszard Pilarczyk	Poland	20.87	
4	Paul Brizzel	Ireland	20.99	
5	Dan Money	Great Britain	20.99	
6	Venancio José	Spain	21.13	
7	Gábor Dobos	Hungary	21.14	
8	Jean-David Bastien	France	21.14	

=== Semifinals ===
12 July
Qualified: first 4 in each to the Final

==== Semifinal 1 ====
Wind: 1.7 m/s

Rank	Name	Nationality	Time	Notes
1	Ryszard Pilarczyk	Poland	20.85	Q
2	Dan Money	Great Britain	20.93	Q
3	Jean-David Bastien	France	21.03	Q
4	Venancio José	Spain	21.09	Q
5	Uwe Eisenbeis	Germany	21.11	
6	Gabriel Burtea	Romania	21.41	
7	Patric Clerc	Switzerland	21.49	
8	Martin Duda	Czech Republic	21.78	

==== Semifinal 2 ====
Wind: 1.8 m/s

Rank	Name	Nationality	Time	Notes
1	Julian Golding	Great Britain	20.50	Q
2	Alessandro Attene	Italy	20.79	Q
3	Paul Brizzel	Ireland	20.95	Q
4	Gábor Dobos	Hungary	21.11	Q
5	Aleksandr Slyunkov	Belarus	21.17	
6	Vitaly Seniv	Ukraine	21.22	
7	Hans-Peter Welz	Austria	21.38	
8	Aldo Tonazzi	Switzerland	21.46	

=== Heats ===
11 July
Qualified: first 3 in each heat and 4 best to the Semifinal

==== Heat 1 ====
Wind: 3.7 m/s

Rank	Name	Nationality	Time	Notes
1	Julian Golding	Great Britain	20.44 w	Q
2	Jean-David Bastien	France	21.07 w	Q
3	Gábor Dobos	Hungary	21.10 w	Q
4	Aleksandr Slyunkov	Belarus	21.14 w	q
5	Martin Duda	Czech Republic	21.32 w	q
6	Panagiótis Sarris	Greece	21.35 w	
7	Tommy Kafri	Israel	21.57 w	

==== Heat 2 ====
Wind: 0.9 m/s

Rank	Name	Nationality	Time	Notes
1	Ryszard Pilarczyk	Poland	20.72	Q
2	Uwe Eisenbeis	Germany	21.16	Q
3	Venancio José	Spain	21.17	Q
4	Martin Blekkerud	Norway	21.69	
5	Michele Paggi	Italy	21.73	
6	Sergey Bychkov	Russia	21.86	

==== Heat 3 ====
Wind: 2.5 m/s

Rank	Name	Nationality	Time	Notes
1	Alessandro Attene	Italy	20.85 w	Q
2	Paul Brizzel	Ireland	20.96 w	Q
3	Gabriel Burtea	Romania	21.19 w	Q
4	Patric Clerc	Switzerland	21.33 w	q
5	Hans-Peter Welz	Austria	21.34 w	q
	Konstadinos Vogiatzákis	Greece	DNF	

==== Heat 4 ====
Wind: 1.4 m/s

Rank	Name	Nationality	Time	Notes
1	Dan Money	Great Britain	21.08	Q
2	Vitaly Seniv	Ukraine	21.37	Q
3	Aldo Tonazzi	Switzerland	21.39	Q
4	Martin Lachkovics	Austria	21.48	
5	Ruddy Zami	France	21.51	
6	Unai Landa	Spain	21.74	
7	Vegar Hollas	Norway	21.82	
8	Géza Pauer	Hungary	21.88	

== Participation ==
According to an unofficial count, 27 athletes from 18 countries participated in the event.

- Austria (2)
- Belarus (1)
- Czech Republic (1)
- France (2)
- Germany (1)
- Great Britain (2)
- Greece (2)
- Hungary (2)
- Ireland (1)
- Israel (1)
- Italy (2)
- Norway (2)
- Poland (1)
- Romania (1)
- Russia (1)
- Spain (2)
- Switzerland (2)
- Ukraine (1)
