= Fernando Ramírez (Norwegian athlete) =

Norwegian sprinter

Fernando Ramirez (born 30 May 1974, in Santo Domingo, Dominican Republic) is a retired athlete who competed for Norway in the sprinting events. He represented his adopted country at the 1995 World Championships, as well as two indoor World Championships.

His 60 metres personal best of 6.57 was the Norwegian record between 1996 and 2008.

He represented the club IL i BUL.

== Competition record ==
Year	Competition	Venue	Position	Event	Notes
Representing Norway
1995	World Indoor Championships	Valencia, Spain	22nd (sf)	60 m	6.80
1995	World Championships	Gothenburg, Sweden	44th (h)	100 m	10.53
1996	European Indoor Championships	Valencia, Spain	11th (sf)	60 m	6.79
1997	World Indoor Championships	Paris, France	17th (sf)	60 m	6.74
1998	European Indoor Championships	Stockholm, Sweden	12th (sf)	60 m	6.70

== Personal bests ==
Outdoor

- 100 metres – 10.33 (+0.9 m/s) (Oslo 1995)

Indoor

- 60 metres – 6.57 (Liévin 1996)
