= Emmanuel Tuffour =

Ghanaian sprinter

Medal record

Men's athletics

Representing Ghana

African Championships
Silver medal – second place	1988 Annaba	200 m
Silver medal – second place	1988 Annaba	4×100 m
Silver medal – second place	1992 Belle Vue Harel	200 m

Emmanuel Tuffour (born December 2, 1966) is a retired Ghanaian sprinter. His best performance in a global event was a seventh place at the 1993 World Championships, but at the 1992 Olympics he failed to qualify for the final by 0.01 second. Tuffour is one of the current national record holders in 4 × 100 m relay with 38,12 seconds, achieved at the 1997 World Championships in Athens.As an experienced. retired athletic champion he plans to put up an athletic academy in his country, Ghana to help give the necessary development to the next generation in the year 2020.

== International competitions ==
Year	Competition	Venue	Position	Event	Notes
Representing Ghana
1987	World Championships	Rome, Italy	14th (sf)	4 × 100 m relay	39.94
1988	African Championships	Annaba, Algeria	2nd	200 m	21.00
1988	African Championships	Annaba, Algeria	2nd	4 × 100 m relay	39.44
1988	Olympic Games	Seoul, South Korea	21st (qf)	100 m	10.37
1989	World Indoor Championships	Budapest, Hungary	27th (h)	60 m	6.85
1989	World Indoor Championships	Budapest, Hungary	15th (h)	200 m	22.09
1991	World Indoor Championships	Seville, Spain	11th (sf)	60 m	6.69
1991	World Championships	Tokyo, Japan	12th (qf)	100 m	10.19
1991	World Championships	Tokyo, Japan	14th (sf)	200 m	20.91
1991	World Championships	Tokyo, Japan	13th (h)	4 × 100 m relay	39.55
1991	All-Africa Games	Cairo, Egypt	3rd	100 m	10.30
1991	All-Africa Games	Cairo, Egypt	2nd	200 m	20.59
1992	African Championships	Belle Vue Maurel, Mauritius	2nd	200 m	21.28
1992	Olympic Games	Barcelona, Spain	13th (sf)	100 m	10.34
1992	Olympic Games	Barcelona, Spain	11th (sf)	200 m	20.78
1992	Olympic Games	Barcelona, Spain	8th (sf)	4 × 100 m relay	39.28
1993	World Indoor Championships	Toronto, Canada	15th (sf)	60 m	6.78
1993	World Indoor Championships	Toronto, Canada	–	200 m	DQ
1993	World Championships	Stuttgart, Germany	11th (sf)	100 m	10.23
1993	World Championships	Stuttgart, Germany	7th	200 m	20.49
1993	World Championships	Stuttgart, Germany	6th (sf)	4 × 100 m relay	38.61
1994	World Cup	London, United Kingdom	2nd	4 × 100 m relay	38.97^{1}
1995	World Championships	Gothenburg, Sweden	16th (qf)	100 m	10.29
1995	World Championships	Gothenburg, Sweden	18th (qf)	200 m	20.61
1995	World Championships	Gothenburg, Sweden	21st (h)	4 × 100 m relay	39.83
1995	All-Africa Games	Harare, Zimbabwe	2nd	100 m	10.28
1995	All-Africa Games	Harare, Zimbabwe	2nd	200 m	20.29
1995	All-Africa Games	Harare, Zimbabwe	1st	4 × 100 m relay	39.12
1996	Olympic Games	Atlanta, United States	13th (sf)	100 m	10.22
1996	Olympic Games	Atlanta, United States	14th (sf)	200 m	20.61
1996	Olympic Games	Atlanta, United States	6th (sf)	4 × 100 m relay	38.62^{2}
1997	World Indoor Championships	Paris, France	27th (h)	60 m	6.73
1997	World Indoor Championships	Paris, France	26th (h)	200 m	21.88
1997	World Championships	Athens, Greece	14th (sf)	100 m	10.33
1997	World Championships	Athens, Greece	28th (h)	200 m	21.25
1997	World Championships	Athens, Greece	5th	4 × 100 m relay	38.26

^{1}Representing Africa
^{2}Did not start in the final
