= Ludvík Bohman =

Czech sprinter

Ludvík Bohman (born 17 March 1973) is a Czech former sprinter.

At the 1998 European Athletics Championships he was eliminated in the heats of the 100 metres and the 4 × 100 metres relay.

His father is sprinter Luděk Bohman and his brother bobsledder Martin Bohman.

Bohman was described as an "internationally famous sprinter" in 1970 by The Windsor Star.

== Personal bests ==
- 100 metres: 10.46 s, Prague, 17 May 1997
- 200 metres: 21.27 s, Ostrava, 23 May 1998
