= Yiannis Zisimides =

Cypriot sprinter (born 1967)

Yiannis Zisimides (Greek: Γιάννης Ζησιμίδης; born 17 August 1967) is a retired Cypriot athlete who competed in the sprinting events. He represented his country at three Summer Olympics, in 1992, 1996 and 2000.

He is the current national record holder in the 100 metres and indoor 60 metres.

== Competition record ==
Year	Competition	Venue	Position	Event	Notes
Representing Cyprus
1986	World Junior Championships	Athens, Greece	33rd (h)	100m	10.89 (wind: +1.0 m/s)
1986	World Junior Championships	Athens, Greece	35th (h)	200m	22.08 (wind: -0.1 m/s)
1986	World Junior Championships	Athens, Greece	—	4 × 100 m relay	DQ
1987	Mediterranean Games	Latakia, Syria	6th	100 m	10.76
1989	European Indoor Championships	The Hague, Netherlands	19th (h)	60 m	6.84
1989	World Indoor Championships	Budapest, Hungary	25th (h)	60 m	6.81
1989	Games of the Small States of Europe	Nicosia, Cyprus	1st	100 m	10.62
1989	Games of the Small States of Europe	Nicosia, Cyprus	2nd	200 m	21.80
1990	Commonwealth Games	Auckland, New Zealand	27th (qf)	100 m	10.75
1990	European Championships	Split, Yugoslavia	23rd (h)	100 m	10.62 (wind: +1.1 m/s)
1991	Games of the Small States of Europe	Andorra la Vella, Andorra	1st	100 m	10.60
1991	Games of the Small States of Europe	Andorra la Vella, Andorra	2nd	200 m	21.14 (w)
1991	Games of the Small States of Europe	Andorra la Vella, Andorra	1st	4 × 100 m relay	40.80
1991	Mediterranean Games	Athens, Greece	2nd	100 m	10.41
1991	Mediterranean Games	Athens, Greece	6th	4 × 100 m relay	41.21
1991	World Championships	Tokyo, Japan	48th (h)	100 m	10.68
1992	European Indoor Championships	Genoa, Italy	23rd (h)	60 m	6.88
1992	Olympic Games	Barcelona, Spain	29th (qf)	100 m	10.65
1992	Olympic Games	Barcelona, Spain	42nd (h)	200 m	21.51
1993	Mediterranean Games	Narbonne, France	4th	100 m	10.35
1993	Mediterranean Games	Narbonne, France	6th	4 × 100 m relay	40.57
1994	European Championships	Helsinki, Finland	20th (qf)	100 m	10.51 (wind: +0.5 m/s)
1995	World Indoor Championships	Barcelona, Spain	18th (sf)	60 m	6.71
1995	Games of the Small States of Europe	Luxembourg City, Luxembourg	2nd	100 m	10.45
1995	Games of the Small States of Europe	Luxembourg City, Luxembourg	2nd	200 m	21.44 (w)
1995	Games of the Small States of Europe	Luxembourg City, Luxembourg	1st	4 × 100 m relay	40.32
1995	World Championships	Gothenburg, Sweden	43rd (h)	100 m	10.53
1996	European Indoor Championships	Stockholm, Sweden	5th (sf)	60 m	6.69
1996	Olympic Games	Atlanta, United States	39th (qf)	100 m	10.45
1996	Olympic Games	Atlanta, United States	22nd (h)	4 × 100 m relay	40.06
1997	World Indoor Championships	Paris, France	16th (sf)	60 m	6.73
1997	Mediterranean Games	Bari, Italy	3rd	4 × 100 m relay	39.12
1997	World Championships	Athens, Greece	35th (qf)	100 m	10.37
1998	European Championships	Budapest, Hungary	31st (qf)	100 m	10.68
1998	European Championships	Budapest, Hungary	12th (h)	4 × 100 m relay	40.96
2000	Olympic Games	Sydney, Australia	25th (h)	4 × 100 m relay	39.75

== Personal bests ==
Outdoor

- 100 metres – 10.11 (+1.5 m/s) (Rethymno 1996) NR
- 200 metres – 20.82 (+1.0 m/s) (Rethymno 1996)

Indoor

- 60 metres – 6.58 (Piraeus 1996) NR
