= Darren Campbell =

British sprinter and coach (born 1973)

Darren Campbell MBE
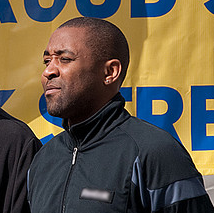
- Darren Campbell in 2009

Personal information
- Nationality: British
- Born: 12 September 1973 (age 52) Sale, Cheshire, England
- Height: 6 ft 0.5 in (1.84 m)

Sport
- Sport: Athletics
- Events: 100 metres, 200 metres
Medal record
Men's athletics
Representing Great Britain
Olympic Games
Gold medal – first place	2004 Athens	4 × 100 m relay
Silver medal – second place	2000 Sydney	200 m
World Championships
Silver medal – second place	1999 Sevilla	4 × 100 m relay
Bronze medal – third place	1997 Athens	4 × 100 m relay
Bronze medal – third place	2003 Paris	100 m
European Championships
Gold medal – first place	1998 Budapest	100 m
Gold medal – first place	1998 Budapest	4 × 100 m relay
Gold medal – first place	2006 Gothenburg	4 × 100 m relay
Silver medal – second place	2002 Munich	100 m
Representing England
Commonwealth Games
Gold medal – first place	1998 Kuala Lumpur	4 × 100 m relay
Gold medal – first place	2002 Manchester	4 × 100 m relay
Bronze medal – third place	2002 Manchester	200 m

Darren Andrew Campbell, MBE (born 12 September 1973) is a British former sprint athlete. He was the sprint coach at Wasps Rugby Club for the 2015–16 season. He competed in the 100 metres and 200 metres, as well as the 4 × 100 metres relay.

Campbell was a promising junior athlete and won a number of medals at the World and European Junior Championships. He spent two years away from athletics, playing professional football but returned in 1995, attending his first Olympics shortly afterwards. He began to compete as part of the British 4 × 100 m relay team and between 1997 and 2000 he won two World Championship medals, a gold medal at the 1998 Commonwealth Games, and set the European record in the event. Success also came in the individual events: he became the 1998 European Champion in the 100 m and won his first Olympic medal, a silver in the 200 m at the 2000 Sydney Games. In the 100 m he won silver at the 2002 European Championships and was the 2003 World Championships bronze medallist.

Campbell formed part of perhaps Britain's most successful relay team – they won in the European Cup in 1999 and 2000, at the 2002 Commonwealth Games, and took the gold at the 2004 Athens Olympics (the first time a British team had done so since 1912). Campbell had also won a gold medal at the 2002 European Championships and a 2003 World Championship silver medal but had to return them when his running-mate, Dwain Chambers, tested positive for banned substances, sparking much animosity between the two. He won his last medal in 2006, again taking the relay gold at the European Championships, and he retired shortly afterwards. His personal bests of 10.04 s in the 100 m and 20.13 s in the 200 m were not prodigiously quick by elite global standards, but over his career he earned an impressive reputation as a 'championship' runner, saving his best for finals and collecting significantly more medals than his times alone would indicate.

Campbell now works with various Premier League football clubs, working with the players to improve their sprinting ability. He also regularly visits schools to promote sport among children, on behalf of the Youth Sport Trust, and he also recently appeared as a VIP guest at Sheffield Hallam University's annual Sports Ball held at Ponds Forge International Sports Centre.

In September 2024, it was announced that Campbell had joined sports tech firm Feldspar as Global Track Strategy Director, to oversee the development and the testing of the company's cutting-edge sensor-enabled high-performance running track.

== Career ==
=== Early career ===
Raised on the Racecourse Estate in Sale, Cheshire Campbell was a talented athlete and footballer in his youth. His first national success in athletics was a gold medal at the English Schools Championships in the 200 m. Campbell then won the 100 m and 200 m gold medals at the 1991 European Junior Championships held in Thessaloniki, Greece, as well as a gold medal in the 4 × 100 m. A year later, he won silver medals at the 1992 World Junior Championships, in the sprint double, and a gold medal in the 4 × 100 m relay. He was beaten both times by Ato Boldon, who became the first athlete to win a double at the championships. His senior international debut came at the Stuttgart World Championships in 1993, as part of the 4 × 100 m squad. However, as a result of injuries, he left athletics at the age of 21 to launch a career in football with trials for Cwmbran Town, Plymouth Argyle, Yorkley, Weymouth, UWIC Inter Cardiff and Newport County amongst others.

=== Return to athletics ===
Campbell returned to athletics in 1995, and ran the 100 m in 10.34sec that year. The following year, he improved his 100 m time to 10.17sec, and represented Britain in the 1996 Summer Olympics in Atlanta, USA. Campbell only represented Britain in the 4 × 100 m relay, but the baton was dropped as it was passed on to him.

At the 1997 World Championships, Campbell won his first major senior medal – a bronze in the 4 × 100 m relay, and by this time was a regular feature in the British squad.

Campbell's first senior gold medals came at the 1998 European Championships in Budapest. Campbell won the 100 m individual event, setting his best time at the 100 m in the final – 10.13sec, and also winning gold in the 4 × 100 m relay. At the Commonwealth Games that year, Campbell helped break the championship record for the 4 × 100 m relay. However, he won no individual medals.

The following year, in the 1999 World Championships, held in Seville, Campbell won the silver medal in the 4 × 100 m relay, but was eliminated from his individual event in the semi-finals.

=== 2000 and the Sydney Olympics ===
In 2000, Campbell won the man of the match award in the European Cup following his performance in the 100 m. Campbell replaced Jason Gardener with 20 minutes notice, and won the race in a time of 10.09sec (wind-assisted). He also ran in a leg in the winning 4 × 100 m relay team.

At the Olympics in Sydney, Campbell placed 6th in the 100 m final, and took a surprise silver medal in the 200 m, as Campbell was mainly a 100 m runner, and had a previous best time of 20.49sec. In the quarter-final, he took 0.29sec off this to reduce to 20.13sec, his fastest time at the distance in his career. This was followed by performances of 20.23sec in the semi-final and 20.14sec in the final to finish second, Campbell's first senior medal at the distance. The gold medal was won by controversial Greek sprinter Konstantinos Kenteris.

=== 2001–2002 ===
Campbell was again hit by injury in 2001, missing the majority of the year's competitions. He had run 10.16sec for the 100 m and 20.41sec for the 200 m, and been named European Cup captain prior to the injury.

After returning from injury the following year, Campbell took bronze in the individual 100 m event and gold in the 4 × 100 m relay at the 2002 European Championships. His bronze was later upgraded to a silver after Dwain Chambers confessed to taking performance-enhancing drugs at this time. However, the relay gold was later taken from him, as Chambers was part of the quartet. He won his quarter-final in the 200 m, but was eliminated after being disqualified for stepping outside his lane.

The year also saw Campbell compete in his home town of Manchester in the Commonwealth Games. He did repeat his Olympic success in the 200 m, receiving bronze in this event. However, he anchored the team to gold in the 4 × 100 m relay along with squad members Jason Gardener, Marlon Devonish and Allyn Condon, just beating Asafa Powell of Jamaica in a very tight photo finish.

=== 2003–2006 ===
In 2003, at the Paris World Championships, Campbell took bronze in the 100 m, but missed on a medal in the 200 m, finishing fourth in the final. He also ran the 2nd leg for the 4 × 100 m relay team, but later lost this medal due to Dwain Chambers being found guilty of doping. Campbell also set his 60 m PB of 6.59sec this year.

In the 2004 Summer Olympics, Campbell won a surprise gold medal in the 4 × 100 m, in a team with Jason Gardener, Marlon Devonish and Mark Lewis-Francis, who defeated the USA team by just 0.01sec, winning in a season's best of 38.07sec. However, Campbell performed less well in the 100 m and 200 m, exiting in the heat and semi-final respectively, due to not being fully recovered from a hamstring injury.

He was named captain for the European Cup in 2005, however did not have a successful season, only placing 5th in the AAA semi-final and running 10.47sec (10.48w) for the 100 m and 20.9sec for the 200 m. He did, however, receive an MBE in the New Year Honours.

Campbell competed at the 2006 Commonwealth Games in Melbourne, however did not progress past the semi-final in the 200 m, and the England team were eliminated in the 4 × 100 m after a faulty baton changeover in their heat. He did not compete individually at the European Championships in Gothenburg, but ran the second leg to help Britain to the gold medal in the 4 × 100 relay.

=== European Championships row ===
On 13 August 2006, after winning the 4 × 100 m European relay gold medal with Great Britain, Campbell left the track without completing a lap of honour with the rest of his teammates. He initially remained cryptic about his problems, but revealed the next day that his lap of honour boycott was due to his loss of two relay medals (2002 European Championships gold and 2003 World Championships silver) as a result of Dwain Chambers' doping. Campbell did, however, explain that he did stand by Chambers insofar as he was not solely accountable, but he felt Chambers had a duty to inform the authorities of the individuals who led him to his departure to America and his resulting adoption of a drug programme. John Regis criticised Campbell for this stand, also noting that his coach (Linford Christie) had served a drugs ban.

Campbell defended himself, saying "I will not regret doing that. At times you have to stand up for what you believe", and also that he was concerned about youngsters ending up the same situation. He also defended his links with Christie, stating that he would not have remained with Christie if he thought he had cheated.

=== Retirement ===
Campbell announced his retirement on 18 August 2006. His final race was at the inaugural Celtic Cup race in Grangemouth, where he won the 100 m competing as a guest. Campbell surprised Dave Collins and UK Athletics, who had been expecting him to retire following the two-day international athletics meeting at Birmingham taking place over the following two days.

In July 2007, Campbell was announced as the new ambassador for Sky Sports Living for Sport, a successful initiative run by the Youth Sport Trust in conjunction with BSkyB, which uses sport as a tool to re-engage young people who may be at risk of opting out of school life. Sky Sports Living for Sport, now in its fifth year, has involved over 600 schools and benefited over 17,000 young people aged 11–16. Campbell's role will see him meet young people and teachers involved in Sky Sports Living for Sport across the country to share his experiences and help inspire them to reach their full potential.

=== Football coaching ===
Campbell is well regarded in football circles; he has given training sessions to Manchester United, Chelsea and Everton. He is said to be a pace and acceleration specialist. Campbell also worked with MK Dons, at the invitation of then manager, Paul Ince.

=== Rugby coaching ===
He has also been engaged by several professional rugby clubs such as Sale Sharks and Saracens to help develop the power and speed of the squad for the 2011–12 season. He has also previously worked with Jonah Lomu while the Kiwi was playing rugby for Cardiff.

== Personal bests ==
Campbell's reputation was made as a championship runner, rather than a runner of fast times. Although he never raced below 10 seconds for 100 m, or 20 seconds for the 200 m, he consistently outperformed rivals with faster personal and seasons bests, enabling him to pick up medals at global and continental championships, and was an excellent, and consistent, relay runner. His medal record of Olympic gold and silver, and World Championship silver and bronze left him second only to Linford Christie among post war British sprinters in terms of global medals, and one of the few British male sprinters to win individual medals at all four major championships.

Event	Time (seconds)	Venue	Date
50 metres	5.77	Madrid, Spain	16 February 1999
60 metres	6.59	Birmingham, England	21 February 2003
100 metres	10.04	Budapest, Hungary	19 August 1998
150 metres	15.47	Sheffield, England	29 June 1997
200 metres	20.13	Sydney, Australia	27 September 2000

- All information taken from IAAF profile.

== Achievements ==
Year	Competition	Venue	Position	Event	Notes
Representing Great Britain and England
1991	European Junior Championships	Thessaloniki, Greece	1st	100 m	10.46
1991	European Junior Championships	Thessaloniki, Greece	1st	200 m	20.61
1991	European Junior Championships	Thessaloniki, Greece	2nd	4 × 100 m relay	39.86
1992	World Junior Championships	Seoul, South Korea	2nd	100 m	10.46 (0.0 m/s)
1992	World Junior Championships	Seoul, South Korea	2nd	200 m	20.87 (+0.3 m/s)
1992	World Junior Championships	Seoul, South Korea	1st	4 × 100 m relay	39.21
1996	European Cup	Madrid, Spain	3rd	4 × 100 m relay	38.67
1996	Olympic Games	Atlanta, USA	–	4 × 100 m relay	DNF
1997	World Championships	Athens, Greece	16th (sf)	100 m	10.37
1997	World Championships	Athens, Greece	3rd	4 × 100 m relay	38.14
1998	European Championships	Budapest, Hungary	1st	100 m	10.04
1998	European Championships	Budapest, Hungary	1st	4 × 100 m relay	38.52
1998	Commonwealth Games	Kuala Lumpur, Malaysia	5th	100 m	10.08
1998	Commonwealth Games	Kuala Lumpur, Malaysia	1st	4 × 100 m relay	38.20
1999	World Championships	Seville, Spain	10th (sf)	100 m	10.15
1999	World Championships	Seville, Spain	2nd	4 × 100 m relay	37.73 (AR)
1999	European Cup	Paris, France	1st	4 × 100 m relay	38.16
2000	Summer Olympics	Sydney, Australia	6th	100 m	10.13
2000	Summer Olympics	Sydney, Australia	2nd	200 m	20.14
2000	European Cup	Gateshead, United Kingdom	1st	100 m	10.09 w
2000	European Cup	Gateshead, United Kingdom	1st	4 × 100 m relay	38.41
2002	European Championships	Munich, Germany	2nd	100 m	10.15
2002	European Championships	Munich, Germany	4th (h)	200 m	20.66^{1}
2002	European Championships	Munich, Germany	–	4 × 100 m relay	DQ
2002	Commonwealth Games	Manchester, United Kingdom	3rd	200 m	20.21
2002	Commonwealth Games	Manchester, United Kingdom	1st	4 × 100 m relay	38.62
2003	World Championships	Paris, France	3rd	100 m	10.08
2003	World Championships	Paris, France	4th	200 m	20.39
2003	World Championships	Paris, France	–	4 × 100 m relay	DQ
2003	European Cup	Florence, Italy	3rd	4 × 100 m relay	38.60
2004	Olympic Games	Athens, Greece	36th (h)	100 m	10.35
2004	Olympic Games	Athens, Greece	15th (sf)	200 m	20.89
2004	Olympic Games	Athens, Greece	1st	4 × 100 m relay	38.07
2006	Commonwealth Games	Melbourne, Australia	14th (h)	200 m	20.94 (w)^{1}
2006	Commonwealth Games	Melbourne, Australia	–	4 × 100 m relay	DNF
2006	European Championships	Gothenburg, Sweden	1st	4 × 100 m relay	38.91

^{1}Disqualified in the quarterfinals

Apart from these performances, during his career Campbell has also won seven national titles at either the 100 or 200 metres.

== Notes ==
- ^{nb} Disqualified and medals stripped after teammate Dwain Chambers tested positive for banned substances.

== Personal life ==
Campbell was a childhood friend of English comedy personality Karl Pilkington, as described in The Ricky Gervais Show podcasts. In a podcast episode, Pilkington claimed to have been responsible for much of Campbell's early training, which mainly involved allowing him to push a go-kart that Pilkington sat in. Campbell later thanked Pilkington in a tweet.

Campbell guest presented children's TV gameshow Best of Friends in the 'sports special' with Iwan Thomas in 2008. He was a participant in round one of Celebrity MasterChef 2011.

Campbell is also a dog breeder, breeding Cavalier King Charles Spaniels, Border Collies, Rottweilers and other breeds.
