= Stéphane Cali =

French sprinter

Stéphane Cali (born 26 April 1972 in Paris) is a retired French athlete who specialised in the sprinting events. He won the bronze medal in the 60 metres at the 1998 European Indoor Championships. He represented his country at the 1997 World Championships reaching the quarterfinals.

== Competition record ==
Year	Competition	Venue	Position	Event	Notes
Representing France
1990	World Junior Championships	Plovdiv, Bulgaria	11th (h)	4x100 m relay	40.70
1991	European Junior Championships	Thessaloniki, Greece	7th	100 m	10.66
1991	European Junior Championships	Thessaloniki, Greece	3rd	4x100 m relay	40.03
1994	Jeux de la Francophonie	Bondoufle, France	13th (sf)	100 m	10.72
1994	Jeux de la Francophonie	Bondoufle, France	6th (h)	4x100 m relay	40.27
1996	European Indoor Championships	Stockholm, Sweden	16th (h)	60 m	6.77
1997	World Indoor Championships	Paris, France	20th (h)	60 m	6.69
1997	Mediterranean Games	Bari, Italy	3rd	100 m	10.28
1997	World Championships	Athens, Greece	44th (qf)	100 m	10.47
1997	World Championships	Athens, Greece	8th (sf)	4x100 m relay	38.71
1998	European Indoor Championships	Valencia, Spain	3rd	60 m	6.60
1998	European Championships	Budapest, Hungary	27th (h)	100 m	10.57
2000	European Indoor Championships	Ghent, Belgium	32nd (h)	60 m	6.87
2001	World Indoor Championships	Lisbon, Portugal	13th (sf)	60 m	6.68
2003	World Indoor Championships	Birmingham, United Kingdom	35th (h)	60 m	6.79

== Personal bests ==
Outdoor

- 100 metres – 10.15 (+1.7 m/s) (La Chaux-de-Fonds 1997)
- 200 metres – 21.26 (+0.4 m/s) (La Valette (FRA) 1996)

Indoor

- 50 metres – 5.65 (Eaubonne 1998) NR
- 60 metres – 6.53 (Eaubonne 1998)
