= Haralabos Papadias =

Greek sprinter

Personal information
- Born: 24 January 1975 (age 51)

Achievements and titles
- Personal best(s): 6.50 (60 m), 10.15 (100 m)
Medal record
Men's athletics
Representing Greece
World Indoor Championships
Gold medal – first place	1997 Paris	60 m
European Championships
Bronze medal – third place	1998 Budapest	100 m

Haralabos Papadias (Χαράλαμπος Παπαδιάς; born 24 January 1975) is a retired Greek sprinter who specialized in the 100 metres.

He won the gold medal in 60 metres at the 1997 World Indoor Championships, in a time of 6.50 seconds (NR). He also finished fourth at the 1996 European Indoor Championships, won the bronze medal at the 1998 European Championships, and finished sixth at the 1998 IAAF World Cup. He also competed at the 1997 World Championships without reaching the final.

His personal best time was 10.15 seconds, achieved at the 1998 IAAF World Cup in Johannesburg. This ranks him fourth among Greek 100 metres sprinters, behind Angelos Pavlakakis, Aristotelis Gavelas and Christoforos Choidis.

== Honours ==
Year	Competition	Venue	Position	Event	Notes
Representing Greece
1994	World Junior Championships	Lisbon, Portugal	26th (h)	100 m	10.73 (wind: +1.7 m/s)
1996	European Indoor Championships	Stockholm, Sweden	4th	60 m	6.65
1997	World Indoor Championships	Paris, France	1st	60 m	6.50 NR
1997	World Championships	Athens, Greece	18th (h)	100 m	10.23
1998	European Indoor Championships	Valencia, Spain	19th (h)	60 m	6.71
1998	European Championships	Budapest, Hungary	3rd	100 m	10.17 PB
1998	European Championships	Budapest, Hungary	4th	4 × 100 m relay	39.07
1998	World Cup	Johannesburg, South Africa	6th	100 m	10.15 PB
