= Maurice Greene (sprinter) =

American sprinter (born 1974)

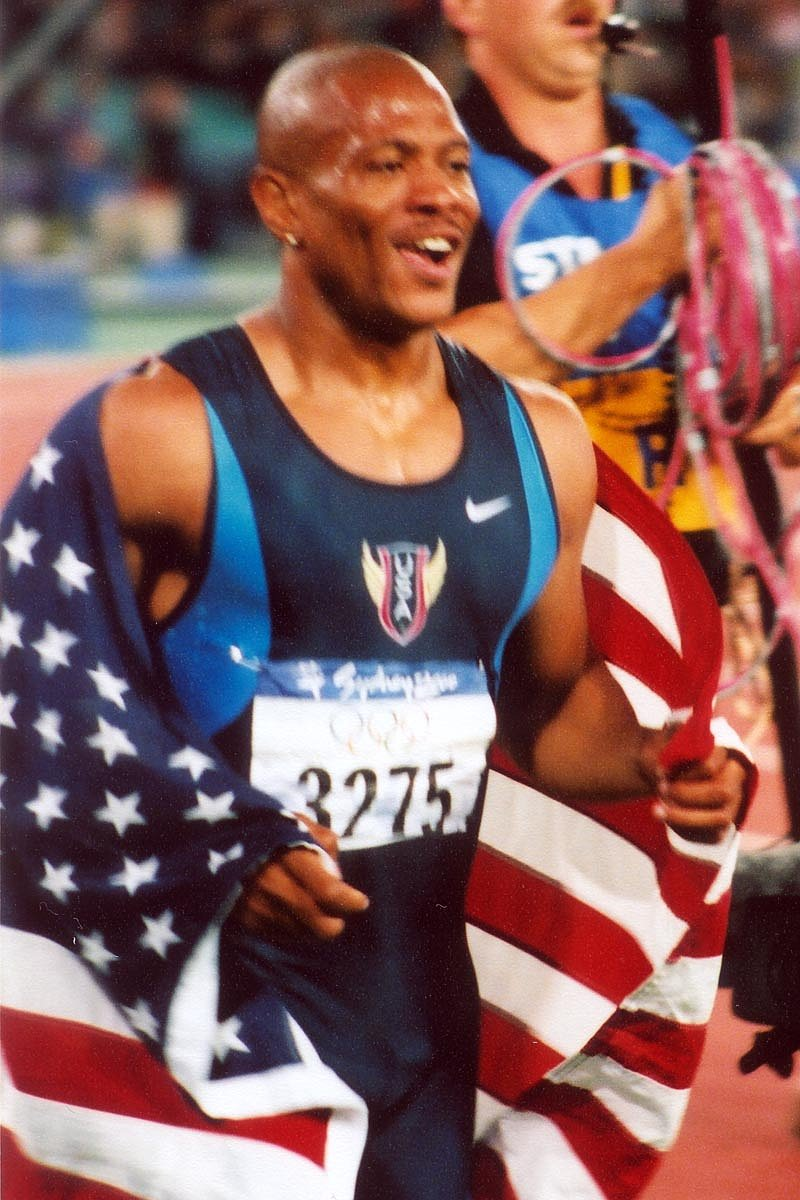
- Greene after winning the 100 m event at the 2000 Summer Olympics in Sydney

Personal information
- Nationality: American
- Born: July 23, 1974 (age 52) Kansas City, Kansas, U.S.
- Height: 5 ft 9 in (176 cm)
- Weight: 180 lb (82 kg)

Sport
- Sport: Sprinting
- Events: 100 meters, 200 meters
- College team: Kansas
Medal record
Men's athletics
Representing the United States
Olympic Games
| Gold medal – first place | 2000 Sydney | 100 m |
| Gold medal – first place | 2000 Sydney | 4 × 100 m relay |
| Silver medal – second place | 2004 Athens | 4 × 100 m relay |
| Bronze medal – third place | 2004 Athens | 100 m |
World Championships
| Gold medal – first place | 1997 Athens | 100 m |
| Gold medal – first place | 1999 Seville | 100 m |
| Gold medal – first place | 1999 Seville | 200 m |
| Gold medal – first place | 1999 Seville | 4 × 100 m relay |
| Gold medal – first place | 2001 Edmonton | 100 m |
World Indoor Championships
| Gold medal – first place | 1999 Maebashi | 60 m |
Goodwill Games
| Gold medal – first place | 1998 New York City | 100 m |
| Gold medal – first place | 1998 New York City | 4 × 100 m relay |

Maurice Greene (born July 23, 1974) is an American former track and field sprinter who competed in the 60 meters, 100 meters, and 200 meters. He is a former 100 m world record holder with a time of 9.79 seconds. During the height of his career (1997–2004) he won four Olympic medals and was a five-time World Champion. This included three golds at the 1999 World Championships, a feat which had previously only been achieved by Carl Lewis and Michael Johnson and has since been equaled by three others.

His career was affected by several injuries from 2001 onwards, although he won the 100 meters bronze and silver in the sprint relay at the 2004 Summer Olympics. Greene was also successful indoors: he was the 1999 Indoor World Champion, was the world record holder in the 60-meter dash for nearly 20 years and remains the joint-fastest man over 50 meters. He raced sparingly after an injury in 2005 and officially retired in 2008. Over his career, he made the third most sub-10-second runs (52) in the 100 m, tied with Usain Bolt and only surpassed by Asafa Powell and Justin Gatlin.

Following his track career he has become an ambassador for the IAAF and a television personality, appearing on Identity, Blind Date, and Dancing with the Stars. Most recently he volunteered as a track coach at University of California at Los Angeles (UCLA) for the 2012–2013 season.

Since then he has become a physical education teacher at American Leadership Academy in Arizona.

== Early life ==
Greene was born in Kansas City, Kansas and attended F.L. Schlagle High School. In his youth and high school, he participated in both American football and track and field. After high school, Greene received a Track scholarship to the University of Kansas. Greene also attended Park University and Kansas City Kansas Community College.

== Sports career ==
=== Early career and breakthrough ===
In 1995 he took part in his first major international tournament at the World Championships in Gothenburg, but was eliminated in the 100 m quarter-finals. His next season was disappointing, as he failed to make the American team for the 1996 Summer Olympics in Atlanta. After watching the Olympic final from the stands, Greene made his way to Los Angeles to seek the coaching of John Smith. He joined the start-up HSI group. He went on to become the group's most visible member.

The following season would be his breakthrough. At the World Championships in Athens, Greene won the 100 m title. This marked the beginning of Greene's dominance in the 100 m. He successfully defended his title in 1999 and 2001 and captured the Olympic gold medal in the 2000 Olympics. He was also successful at the 200 m. At the 1999 World Championships, he also won the 200 m title, the first to win both sprint events at a World Championships. However, he did not run the 200 m at the 2000 Olympics after an injury at the US trials.

=== World record holder and athletic prime ===
In 1999 he set the 100 m world record at 9.79 s (+0.1 m/s wind), beating Donovan Bailey's standing world record of 9.84 s (+0.7 m/s wind), and lowering the world record by the largest margin since the advent of electronic timing. Greene also matched Bailey's 50 m indoor world record time, but the run was never ratified. He also set the 60 m indoor world record twice. His 60 m indoor record is currently at 6.39 seconds. In addition, Maurice Greene was the only sprinter to hold the 60 m and 100 m world records at the same time. The previous IAAF logo was created in Greene's image.

In 2002, Greene lost his 100 m world record to fellow American Tim Montgomery, who beat his time by 0.01 (9.78 s +2.0 m/s), while Greene himself was injured and watched the race from the stands; Montgomery has since been found guilty of using performance-enhancing drugs, and his record has been retroactively rescinded. The record was broken legitimately by Asafa Powell in 2005 with a time of 9.77 s (+1.6 m/s wind).

At the 2004 Summer Olympics in Athens, Greene added to his medal tally with the bronze after finishing third in his attempt to defend his 100 m title to Justin Gatlin, and a silver as the anchor leg runner on the United States 4 × 100 m relay team, narrowly denied another Olympic Gold by the British team, who won by 0.01 seconds.

Greene ran 52 sub-10-second 100 m races during his career, which at the time was more than any other sprinter in history. This record has now been surpassed by Asafa Powell who has 97 100 m sub-10-second runs to his name and Justin Gatlin who has 64 100 m sub-10-second runs to his name and equalled by Usain Bolt who has the same amount of sub-10-second runs with 52. Previously Greene had held the record for the most wind-legal sub-10-second clockings for 100 m in one season when he ran 9 sub-10s in 1999. This record was also broken by Asafa Powell in 2006 (12), and it was improved by Powell in 2008 to 15.

On December 21, 2006, he appeared as one of the "strangers" on the NBC game show Identity. The contestant, a self-professed track and field fan, incorrectly identified him by name as Marion Jones, although she identified him as the "world's fastest man."

=== Post-running ===
On February 4, 2008, Greene announced his retirement from track and field in Beijing, citing nagging injuries and a wish to see new individuals succeed in the sport. Greene said he hopes to pursue coaching and business interests.

In April 2008, the New York Times reported that Greene had paid Mexican discus thrower Angel Guillermo Heredia $10,000, which Heredia claimed was in payment for performance-enhancing drugs. Greene admitted meeting Heredia and making the payment but claimed it was common for him to pay for "stuff" for other members of his training group, and reiterated that he had never used banned drugs.

Greene was a contestant on Season 7 of Dancing with the Stars, and was paired with two-time champion Cheryl Burke. He was eliminated in Week 8 of the competition, taking 5th place. He hyperextended his leg during the competition. He later helped out in their pro-dancer competition and danced a Tango with future winner Anna Demidova. Greene also appeared on the American television series Blind Date where he was paired with a woman named Christie. Greene and Christie agreed that they would see each other again.

He has a tattoo that reads GOAT referring to his claim to be the "Greatest of All Time".

== Media ==
In an event set up by ESPN's Todd Gallagher, Greene appeared in the book "Andy Roddick Beat Me With a Frying Pan" racing in a 100-meter race against the book's editor, who had a 31-meter head start and the help of a moving sidewalk. Greene lost by a nose.

Maurice Greene hosted the monthly show "Greene Light" on Eurosport where he met stars of athletics, such as Blanka Vlašić, Allyson Felix and Churandy Martina.

Greene was also the cover athlete for the multi-platform video game International Track & Field 2000, which was developed by Konami.

== Personal bests ==
| Event | Time | Date | Venue | Notes |
|---|---|---|---|---|
| 50 m | 5.56 | February 13, 1999 | Los Angeles, United States | Tied world record (not ratified) |
| 60 m | 6.39 | March 2, 1998 | Madrid, Spain | Equalled in Atlanta, United States on March 3, 2001, former world record |
| 100 m | 9.79 | June 16, 1999 | Athens, Greece | +0.1 m/s wind, former world record |
| 200 m | 19.86 | July 7, 1997 | Stockholm, Sweden | +1.6 m/s wind |

== International competitions ==
| Year | Competition | Venue | Position | Event | Notes |
|---|---|---|---|---|---|
| 1995 | World Indoor Championships | Barcelona, Spain | 4th | 60 m | |
| 1997 | World Championships | Athens, Greece | 1st | 100 m | |
| 1998 | Goodwill Games | New York City, United States | 1st | 100 m | |
| 1998 | Goodwill Games | New York City, United States | 1st | 4 × 100 m relay | |
| 1999 | World Indoor Championships | Maebashi, Japan | 1st | 60 m | |
| 1999 | World Championships | Seville, Spain | 1st | 100 m | |
| 1999 | World Championships | Seville, Spain | 1st | 200 m | |
| 1999 | World Championships | Seville, Spain | 1st | 4 × 100 m relay | |
| 1999 | Grand Prix Final | Munich, Germany | 2nd | 200 m | |
| 2000 | Olympic Games | Sydney, Australia | 1st | 100 m | |
| 2000 | Olympic Games | Sydney, Australia | 1st | 4 × 100 m relay | |
| 2001 | World Championships | Edmonton, Canada | 1st | 100 m | |
| 2004 | Olympic Games | Athens, Greece | 3rd | 100 m | |
| 2004 | Olympic Games | Athens, Greece | 2nd | 4 × 100 m relay | |
| 2005 | World Championships | Helsinki, Finland | — | 4 × 100 m relay | DNF |

== National competitions ==
| Year | Competition | Venue | Position | Event | Notes |
|---|---|---|---|---|---|
| 1995 | USA Outdoor Track and Field Championships | Sacramento | 100 m | | |
| 1997 | USA Outdoor Track and Field Championships | Indianapolis | 1st | 100 m | |
| 1999 | USA Outdoor Track and Field Championships | Eugene | 200 m | | |
| 2000 | U.S. Olympic Team Trials | Sacramento | 1st | 100 m | |
| 2001 | USA Indoor Track and Field Championships | New York City | 1st | 60 m | |
| 2002 | USA Outdoor Track and Field Championships | Palo Alto | 100 m | | |
| 2004 | U.S. Olympic Team Trials | Sacramento | 1st | 100 m | |
| 2005 | USA Outdoor Track and Field Championships | Carson | DNF | 100 m | |

== Meeting wins ==
IAAF Golden League

- Golden Gala 100 m: 1999, 2000, 2001, 2002
- Golden Gala 200 m: 2000
- Meeting de Paris 100 m: 2001, 2002
- Meeting de Paris 200 m: 1999
- Internationales Stadionfest 100 m: 1998, 2000
- Internationales Stadionfest 200 m: 1999
- Memorial Van Damme 100 m: 1998, 2000
- Weltklasse Zürich 100 m: 1999, 2000

Other

- Athens Grand Prix Tsiklitiria 100 m: 1999
- Osaka Grand Prix 100 m: 2000
- New Balance Indoor Grand Prix 60 m: 1999

== Dancing with the Stars ==
| Week | Dance(s)/Song(s) | Inaba | Goodman | Tonioli | Result |
|---|---|---|---|---|---|
| 1 | Foxtrot/"Doing it to Death"; Mambo/"I Do the Jerk" | 6; 7 | 6; 7 | 6; 7 | Safe |
| 2 | Rumba/"Mercy Mercy Me" | 7 | 6 | 6 | Safe |
| 3 | Jive/"Rock Around the Clock" | 8 | 8 | 8 | Safe |
| 4 | Samba/"That's the Way (I Like It)" | 6 | 7 | 7 | Safe |
| 5 | Salsa/"Everything I Can't Have" | 9 | 9 | 9 | Safe |
| 6 | Viennese Waltz/"Gravity" | 7 | 7 | 7 | Safe |
| 7 | Cha-Cha-Cha/"Cupid Shuffle"; Team Paso Doble/"Rocks" | 8; 10 | 9; 9 | 8; 10 | Safe |
| 8 Quarter Finals | Quickstep/"Puttin' on the Ritz"; Paso Doble/"Let it Rock" | 8; 8 | 8; 8 | 8; 8 | Eliminated |

== See also ==
- List of men's Olympic and World Championship athletics sprint champions
- List of 100 metres national champions (men)
- List of 2000 Summer Olympics medal winners
- List of 2004 Summer Olympics medal winners
- 100 metres at the Olympics
- 4 × 100 metres relay at the Olympics
- 100 metres at the World Championships in Athletics
- 200 metres at the World Championships in Athletics
- 4 × 100 metres relay at the World Championships in Athletics
- List of people from Kansas City, Kansas

Records
| Preceded by Andre Cason | Men's 60 m World Indoor Record Holder; February 3, 1998 – January 20, 2018 | Succeeded by Christian Coleman |
Awards and achievements
| Preceded by Wilson Kipketer; Michael Johnson | Men's Track & Field ESPY Award; 1999; 2001–2002 | Succeeded by Michael Johnson; Tim Montgomery |
| Preceded by Mark O'Meara | BBC Overseas Sports Personality of the Year; 1999 | Succeeded by Tiger Woods |
