= Miguel Janssen =

Dutch sportsman and athletics competitor

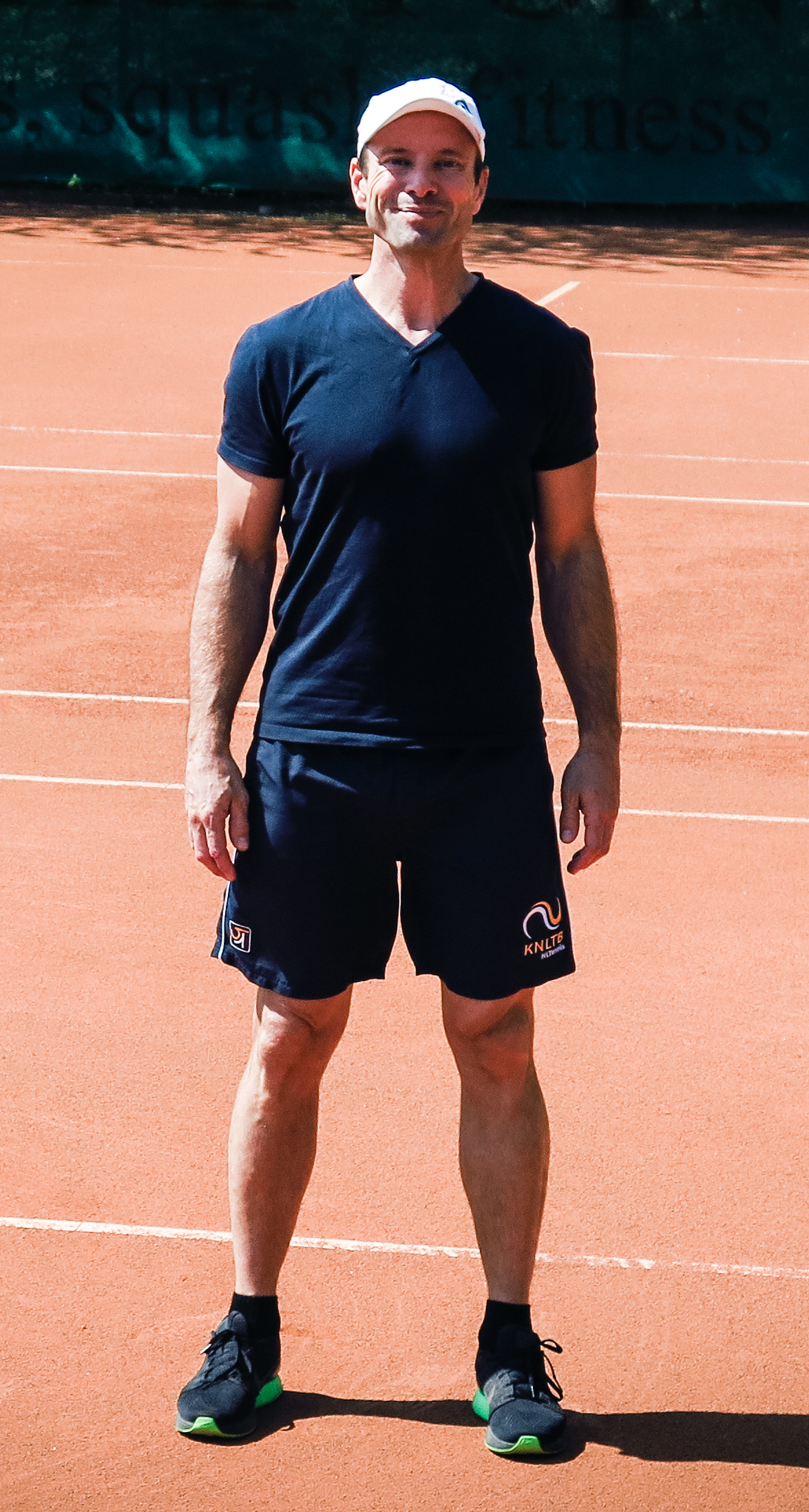
- Janssen in 2015

Personal information
- Born: 5 September 1970 (age 55) Oranjestad, Aruba
- Education: Centraal Instituut Opleiding Sportleiders
- Height: 1.85 m (6 ft 1 in)
- Weight: 80 kg (176 lb)

Sport
- Sport: Track and field
- Events: 100 m, 200 m
- Club: Amsterdamse Atletiek Combinatie
- Coached by: Henk Kraaijenhof

Miguel Janssen (born 5 September 1970 in Oranjestad) is a retired Dutch-Aruban athlete who competed in sprinting events. He represented Aruba at the 1996 Summer Olympics, as well as three outdoor and three indoor World Championships. He later switched allegiance to the Netherlands on 2 August 1998 but did not represent that country at any major competition. Janssen still holds Aruban records on several distances. In addition, he is a former Dutch record holder in the 60 metres indoors and 200 metres outdoors.

His father Harry Janssen was a Dutch middle-distance runner and president of the Aruba Athletic Federation while his mother Ciska Janssen was a Dutch long jumper.

== Competition record ==
Year	Competition	Venue	Position	Event	Notes
Representing Aruba
1993	World Indoor Championships	Toronto, Canada	35th (h)	60 m	6.97
1993	World Championships	Stuttgart, Germany	37th (h)	100 m	10.62
1993	World Championships	Stuttgart, Germany	49th (h)	200 m	21.51
1994	South American Games	Valencia, Venezuela	8th	100 m	10.64
1994	South American Games	Valencia, Venezuela	7th	200 m	21.6
1995	World Indoor Championships	Barcelona, Spain	23rd (sf)	60 m	6.83
1995	World Indoor Championships	Barcelona, Spain	21st (h)	200 m	21.90
1995	World Championships	Gothenburg, Sweden	65th (h)	100 m	10.73
1995	World Championships	Gothenburg, Sweden	56th (h)	200 m	21.31
1996	Olympic Games	Atlanta, United States	71st (h)	200 m	21.72
1997	World Indoor Championships	Paris, France	41st (h)	60 m	6.87
1997	World Championships	Athens, Greece	56th (h)	100 m	10.47

== Personal bests ==
Outdoor

- 100 metres – 10.37 (+0.9 m/s) (Apeldoorn 1999)
- 200 metres – 20.59 (Assen 1994)
- 400 metres – 48.31 (Groningen 1995)

Indoor

- 60 metres – 6.63 (The Hague 1998)
- 200 metres – 21.14 (Ghent 1998)
