= Koji Ito =

Japanese sprinter (born 1970)

Personal information
- Nationality: Japanese
- Born: 29 January 1970 (age 56) Kobe city, Hyogo prefecture, Japan
- Height: 180 cm (5 ft 11 in)

Sport
- Sport: Track and field
- Event: Sprints
- Club: Tokai University, Fujitsu

Achievements and titles
- Personal best: 100 m: 10.00 200 m: 20.16 400 m: 46.11
Medal record
Men's athletics
Representing Japan
Asian Games
Gold medal – first place	1994 Hiroshima	4X100 m
Gold medal – first place	1998 Bangkok	100 m
Gold medal – first place	1998 Bangkok	200 m
Gold medal – first place	1998 Bangkok	4X100 m
Silver medal – second place	1994 Hiroshima	200 m
Asian Championships
Gold medal – first place	1991 Kuala Lumpur	4×400 m
Gold medal – first place	1993 Manila	4×400 m
Gold medal – first place	1998 Fukuoka	200 m
Silver medal – second place	1998 Fukuoka	4×100 m
Bronze medal – third place	1991 Kuala Lumpur	400 m
Bronze medal – third place	1991 Kuala Lumpur	4×100 m
Bronze medal – third place	1993 Manila	400 m
East Asian Games
Gold medal – first place	1997 Busan	200 m
Bronze medal – third place	1993 Shanghai	200 m

Koji Ito (伊東 浩司, Itō Kōji; born 29 January 1970 in Kobe) is a retired Japanese track and field sprinter and Japan's fourth-fastest record holder of 100m sprint with a time of 10.00 seconds. He held the 100 metres Japanese national record between December 1998 and September 2017. He is a former Asian record holder in the 100 metres and 200 metres, and still holds the indoor record as well as the 4×400 metres relay record.

He is married to former long-distance runner Hiromi Suzuki.

== Career ==
He started out as a 400 metres runner and after winning a bronze at the 1991 Asian Athletics Championships, he was selected for the relay at the 1991 World Championships in Athletics and represented his country on home turf. In 1993 he won a bronze medal at the 1993 East Asian Games and the 1993 Asian Athletics Championships. He managed to reach the quarter-finals of the 200 m of the World Championships that year. His 1994 was highlighted by a silver medal at his first Asian Games in Hiroshima.

He represented Japan at the 1996 Atlanta Olympics and managed to reach the semifinals of the 200 m and helped the 4×400 m relay to secure fifth place in the final in an Asian record time. He won his first major championship title in 1997, winning the 200 m gold at the East Asian Games, but he did not get past the heat stages at either the IAAF World Indoor Championships or the World Championships in Athletics.

The following year marked his career peak: he started with a win in the 200 m at the 1998 Asian Athletics Championships and went on to win a sprint double at the 1998 Asian Games in Games record times. In winning the Asian Games 100 m crown on 13 December 1998 (Bangkok) he ran a time of 10.00 seconds, during a semi-final heat. This time had been Japanese national record for 19 years until Yoshihide Kiryū shaving 0.02 off in 2017. He was the Most Valuable Player of the 13th Asian Games.

Ito also clocked a personal best of 20.16 s in the 200 m on 2 October 1998 at Kumamoto, Japan. He put in a strong performance at the 1999 World Indoor Championships, just missing out on the 60 metres final and running an Asian indoor record time for fifth place in the 200 m competition. At the 2000 Sydney Olympics, Ito finished seventh in the semi-finals in both the 100 m and 200 m events (10.39 s and 20.67 s respectively); the Japanese men's 4 × 100 m team (Nobuharu Asahara, Koji Ito, Shigeyuki Kojima, Shingo Suetsugu) finished sixth in 38.66 s. Suetsugu later went on to follow in Ito's footsteps as Japan's top male sprinter. Ito never again matched the form of his high-water-mark 1998 season and retired in 2002.

== Achievements ==
Year	Competition	Venue	Position	Notes
Representing Japan
1991	Asian Athletics Championships	Kuala Lumpur, Malaysia	3rd	400 m
1991	World Championships	Tokyo, Japan	4th (heats)	4 × 400 m relay
1993	East Asian Games	Shanghai, China	3rd	200 m
1993	World Championships	Stuttgart, Germany	6th (quarter-finals)	200 m
1993	World Championships	Stuttgart, Germany	7th (heats)	4 × 100 m relay
1993	Asian Athletics Championships	Manila, Philippines	3rd	400 m
1994	Asian Games	Hiroshima, Japan	2nd	200 m
1994	Asian Games	Hiroshima, Japan	1st	4X100 m Relay
1995	World Indoor Championships	Barcelona, Spain	5th (semis)	200 m
1995	World Championships	Gothenburg, Sweden	6th (quarter-finals)	200 m
1996	Summer Olympics	Atlanta, United States	6th (semis)	200 m
1996	Summer Olympics	Atlanta, United States	DNF	4 × 100 m relay
1996	Summer Olympics	Atlanta, United States	5th (AR)	4 × 400 m relay
1997	World Indoor Championships	Paris, France	3rd (heats)	60 m
1997	World Indoor Championships	Paris, France	4th (heats)	200 m
1997	East Asian Games	Busan, South Korea	1st	200 m
1997	World Championships	Athens, Greece	4th (heats)	100 m
1997	World Championships	Athens, Greece	4th (heats)	200 m
1998	Asian Athletics Championships	Fukuoka, Japan	1st	200 m
1998	Asian Games	Bangkok, Thailand	1st	100 m
1998	Asian Games	Bangkok, Thailand	1st	200 m
1998	Asian Games	Bangkok, Thailand	1st	4X100 m Relay
1998	IAAF World Cup	Johannesburg, South Africa	4th	200 m
1999	World Indoor Championships	Maebashi, Japan	4th (semis)	60 m
1999	World Indoor Championships	Maebashi, Japan	5th (AR)	200 m
1999	World Championships	Seville, Spain	7th (quarter-finals)	100 m
1999	World Championships	Seville, Spain	6th (semis)	200 m
1999	World Championships	Seville, Spain	4th (heats)	4 × 400 m relay
2000	Summer Olympics	Sydney, Australia	7th (semis)	100 m
2000	Summer Olympics	Sydney, Australia	7th (semis)	200 m
2000	Summer Olympics	Sydney, Australia	6th	4 × 100 m relay
