= Rohsaan Griffin =

American sprinter (born 1974)

Rohsaan Griffin (born 21 February 1974) is an American former sprinter who specialized in the 200 metres.

He was born in Texas City. He finished fifth at the 1997 World Indoor Championships and sixth at the 1999 World Indoor Championships. He became US Indoor champion in 1997 and 1999.

His personal best times were 20.13 seconds in the 200 meters, achieved in July 1999 in Saint-Denis; and 10,36 in the 100 meters, achieved in May 1999 in Austin.

In 1999, Griffin set an American indoor record of 20.32 seconds in the 200 metres.

Griffin ran collegiate track at Louisiana State University.
