= Aleksandr Streltsov =

Swiss-Ukrainian bobsledder (born 1975)

Medal record

Bobsleigh

World Championships
Silver medal – second place	2007 St. Moritz	Two-man

Aleksandr Streltsov (sometimes listed as Olexandr Streltsov; Russian: Александр Александрович Стрельцов; born 7 March 1975) is a Ukraine-born Swiss sprinter turned bobsledder. He competed in the bobsled from 2001 to 2005 for Ukraine and for Switzerland since 2005. He won a silver medal in the two-man event at the 2007 FIBT World Championships in St. Moritz.

Streltsov finished 34th in the two-man at the 2002 Winter Olympics in Salt Lake City competing for Ukraine.
