= Tim Montgomery =

American sprinter (born 1975)

Personal information
- Born: January 28, 1975 (age 51) Gaffney, South Carolina, U.S.
- Height: 5 ft 10 in (178 cm)
- Weight: 160 lb (73 kg)

Sport
- Sport: Track and field
- Event: 100-meter dash
- College team: Blinn Buccaneers; Norfolk State Spartans

Achievements and titles
- Personal bests: 100 m : 9.92 (Indianapolis 1997); 200 m : 20.52 (Osaka 1999)
Medal record
Men's athletics
Representing United States
Olympic Games
Gold medal – first place	2000 Sydney	4 × 100 m relay
Silver medal – second place	1996 Atlanta	4 × 100 m relay
World Championships
Gold medal – first place	1999 Sevilla	4 × 100 m relay
Bronze medal – third place	1997 Athens	100 m
Disqualified	2001 Edmonton	4 × 100 m relay
World Indoor Championships
Silver medal – second place	2001 Lisbon	60 m

Timothy Montgomery (born January 28, 1975) is an American former track sprinter who specialized in the 100-meter dash. In 2005, he was stripped of his records—including a now-void men's 100-meter world record of 9.78 seconds set in 2002—after being found guilty of using performance-enhancing drugs as a central figure in the BALCO scandal. Since retiring from athletics, he has been tried and convicted for his part in a New York–based check fraud scheme and for dealing heroin in the Hampton Roads area of Virginia.

Montgomery's first major medal was an Olympic silver in the 4 × 100-meter relay at the 1996 Atlanta Olympics. He was a 100-meter bronze medalist at the 1997 World Championships, then shared in the relay gold medal with the United States team at the 1999 World Championships. He also took Olympic gold at the 2000 Summer Olympics with the American relay team. He initially won a silver medal in the 100 meters at the 2001 World Championships, but this was nullified due to doping. His official personal best for the 100 meters stands at 9.92 seconds, making him a sub-10 second sprinter.

== Career ==
Born in Gaffney, South Carolina, Montgomery was initially a basketball and football player prior to trying out for track. He attended Gaffney High School where he ran track, winning the 200 meter state title his senior year.

Montgomery studied at Blinn College in Brenham, Texas, and transferred to Norfolk State University in 1994. Located in the Hampton Roads area of the Virginia port city of Norfolk, Norfolk State was known for its strong track program. While in school, he competed in several junior track events, and did well in the sprint and relay events.

Montgomery did not qualify for the 100 meters at the 1996 Summer Olympics, but he did compete in Atlanta in the heats of the 4 × 100-meter relay team that eventually finished second behind Canada. He qualified for his first major international tournament in 1997, and won the bronze medal at those World Championships, finishing third behind Maurice Greene. Two years later, Montgomery came in sixth in the individual final, but did win a gold medal with the United States relay team.

Montgomery did not qualify for the individual 100 meters at the 2000 Summer Olympics in Sydney, though he again ran as an alternate in the heats of the relay event. In the final, the United States won the gold medal.

Montgomery broke Greene's 100-meter world record by 0.01 seconds in September 2002. With a maximum-allowable tailwind of 2.0 meters per second (4.5 mph), Montgomery posted a time of 9.78 seconds. This record was later nullified because of doping.

== Business ==
In 2014, Montgomery relocated to Gainesville, Florida, to start a business focused on general athletic and sports training for youth and adults. The motto for the business is "Never Underestimate My Ability" as encoded into the business website name NUMA Speed. The motto is a reference to both the initial success, extensive life challenges and ultimate redemption reflected in his athletic and business timeline.

== Steroid scandal ==
Montgomery did not qualify for the 2004 Summer Olympics, finishing seventh in the final of the United States Olympic trials. Before the trials, however, he was charged with using illegal performance-enhancing drugs by the United States Anti-Doping Agency (USADA). While he has not returned a positive drug test, according to press reports he testified to the agency that he, along with a number of other prominent athletes, obtained steroids and human growth hormone from BALCO, a laboratory near San Francisco. The USADA sought a four-year suspension on Montgomery, who appealed to the Court of Arbitration for Sport (CAS). On December 13, 2005, CAS found Montgomery guilty and imposed a two-year ban. On top of the ban, all of Montgomery's results and awards since March 31, 2001, including his former world record, were also stripped. After the ban was made public, Montgomery announced his retirement. The investigation also implicated his former partner Marion Jones, winner of the women's 100 meters at the 2000 Sydney Games.

On November 24, 2008, Montgomery admitted to taking testosterone and human growth hormone before the Sydney Games 4 × 100-meter relay, in which he helped claim the gold medal. After the admission an International Olympic Committee spokesperson said the committee would look into the matter as part of its open file on the BALCO investigation, but as of 2019 the United States team continues to be officially listed as the winner of the event and no action has been taken against teammates Jon Drummond, Bernard Williams, Brian Lewis, Maurice Greene, and Kenny Brokenburr.

== Money laundering charge ==
In April 2006, Montgomery was indicted and arrested on fraud charges for his alleged involvement in a money laundering scheme. He was accused of depositing three bogus checks totaling $775,000. Montgomery allegedly received $20,000 for his participation. His former coach, Steve Riddick, was also a defendant in the case.

Riddick served a prison term of five years and three months. Marion Jones served a six-month prison term for lying to investigators about the check-fraud scam.

Montgomery pleaded guilty to the charges on April 9, 2007. He was sentenced to 46 months in prison on May 16, 2008.

== Heroin arrest ==
On May 1, 2008, an indictment was unsealed that accused Montgomery of dealing more than 100 grams of heroin in the Hampton Roads area over the previous year, according to the Virginian-Pilot, the daily newspaper in Virginia Beach. Montgomery told the newspaper he knew nothing of the accusations and that his arrest was a "total surprise."

In October 2008, Montgomery was found guilty and sentenced to five years in prison.

== Personal life ==
Montgomery has four children. His son Tim Jr (June 2003) is with Marion Jones; He married Jamalee Montgomery, the mother of his other children, in October 2009. His daughter Tymiah (2001) ran track for University of Florida Gators and he has two younger sons.

== See also ==
- List of doping cases in athletics

Awards and achievements
Preceded by Maurice Greene	Men's Track & Field ESPY Award; 2003	Succeeded by Tom Pappas
