= Ryszard Pilarczyk =

Polish sprinter

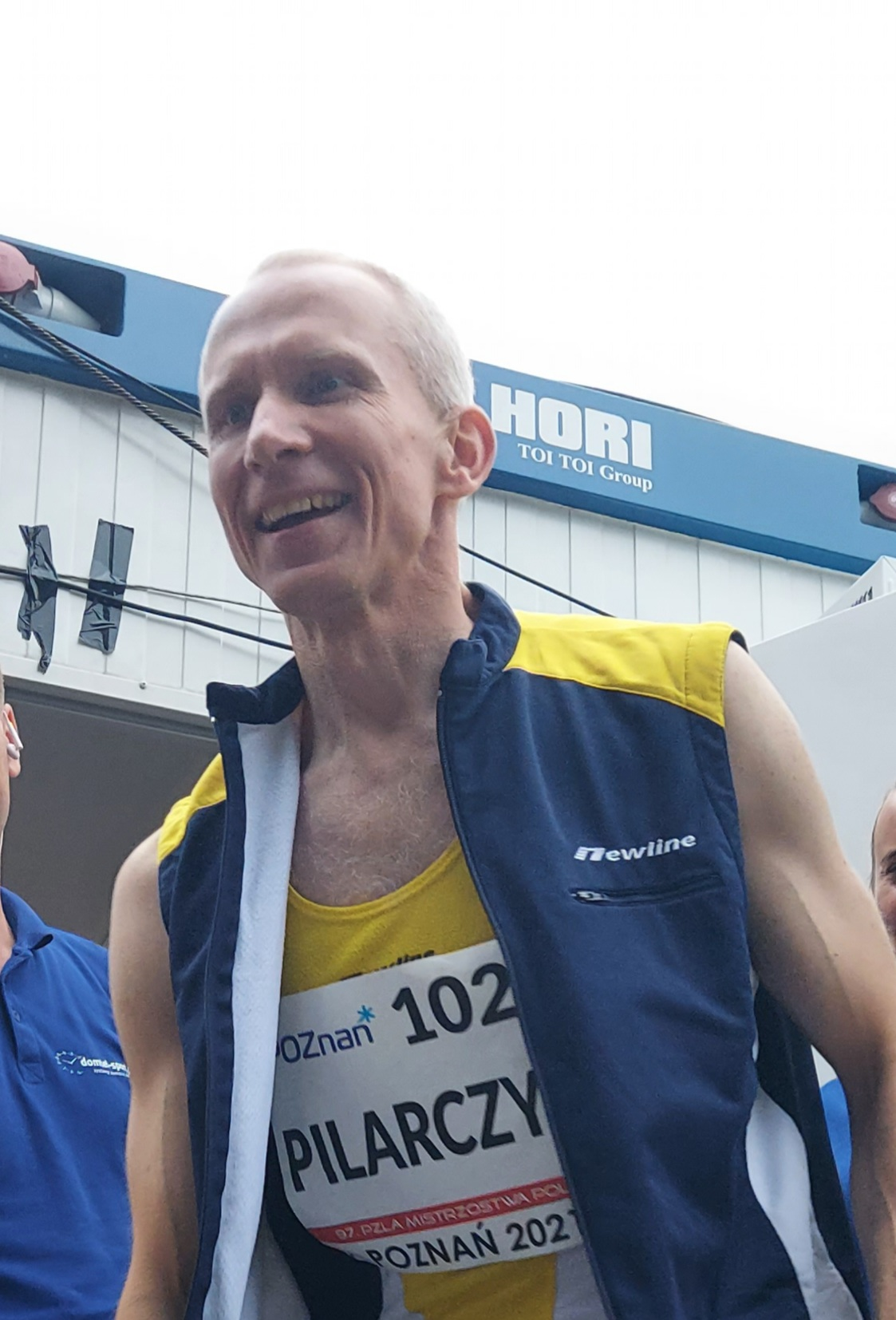
- Ryszard Pilarczyk in 2021

Personal information
- Nationality: Polish
- Born: 5 November 1975 (age 50) Poznań, Poland
- Height: 1.77 m (5 ft 10 in)
- Weight: 69 kg (152 lb)

Sport
- Sport: Athletics
- Events: 100 m, 200 m
Medal record
Men's athletics
Representing Poland
European Championships
Silver medal – second place	2002 Munich	4x100 m relay
Bronze medal – third place	1998 Budapest	4x100 m relay

Ryszard Pilarczyk (born 5 November 1975) is a former Polish athlete specializing in sprinting events.

== Competition record ==
Year	Competition	Venue	Position	Event	Notes
Representing Poland
1997	European U23 Championships	Turku, Finland	3rd	200m	20.87
1997	European U23 Championships	Turku, Finland	2nd	4 × 100 m relay	39.27
1997	European U23 Championships	Turku, Finland	1st	4 × 400 m relay	3:03.07
1997	Universiade	Catania, Italy	8th	100 m	10.59
1997	Universiade	Catania, Italy	4th	4 × 100 m relay	39.39
1998	European Indoor Championships	Valencia, Spain	5th	60 m	6.64
1998	European Championships	Budapest, Hungary	9th (sf)	100 m	10.35
1998	European Championships	Budapest, Hungary	3rd	4 × 100 m relay	38.98
1999	Universiade	Palma, Spain	7th	4 × 100 m relay	39.46
2000	Olympic Games	Sydney, Australia	8th	4 × 100 m relay	38.96
2001	World Championships	Edmonton, Canada	6th	4 × 100 m relay	39.71
2002	European Championships	Munich, Germany	2nd	4 × 100 m relay	38.71

== Personal bests ==
Outdoors

- 100m 10.26 (Athens 1997)
- 200m 20.69 (Kraków 1997)

Indoors

- 60m 6.59 (Valencia 1998)
- 200m 20.96 (Dortmund 1999)
