= Robert Esmie =

Canadian sprinter (born 1972)

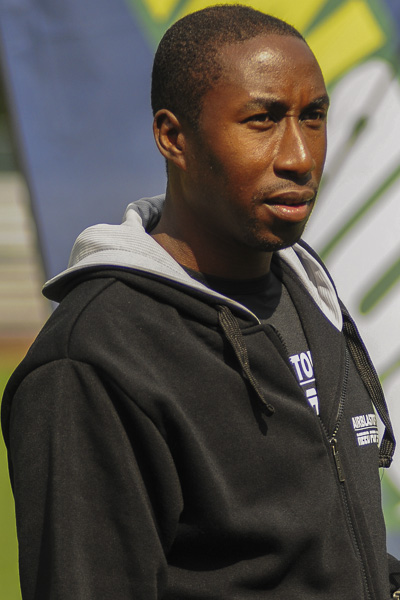

Personal information
- Born: July 5, 1972 (age 54) Kingston, Jamaica
- Children: 2

Sport
- Sport: Track and field
Medal record
Representing Canada
Olympic Games
Gold medal – first place	1996 Atlanta	4 × 100 m relay
World Championships
Gold medal – first place	1995 Gothenburg	4 × 100 m relay
Gold medal – first place	1997 Athens	4 × 100 m relay
Bronze medal – third place	1993 Stuttgart	4 × 100 m relay
World Indoor Championships
Bronze medal – third place	1995 Barcelona	60 m

Robert Esmie (born July 5, 1972) is a Canadian retired sprinter, who was a member of the gold medal-winning Canadian 4 × 100 m relay team at the 1996 Summer Olympics.

Born in Kingston, Jamaica, and raised in Sudbury, Ontario, Esmie was part, along with Glenroy Gilbert, Bruny Surin and Donovan Bailey, of a 4 × 100 m relay team in the mid-1990s. They were number one in the world from 1994 to 1999.

Esmie placed seventh (10.23) in the second semi-final of the 100 m and won a bronze medal in the 4 × 100 m relay at the 1993 World Championships. At the 1994 Commonwealth Games, he competed in the 100 metres.

Esmie won a bronze medal in the 60 m at the 1995 World Indoor Championships and was again a member of gold medal-winning Canadian 4 × 100 m relay team at the 1995 World Championships.

At the Atlanta Olympics the Canadian men's 4 × 100 relay team was not favored despite winning most high-profile titles in the previous three years, including the 1995 World Championships. Leading up to the Olympics, the United States team of Jon Drummond, Tim Harden, Michael Marsh and Dennis Mitchell claimed they would beat Canada; however, in the 4 × 100 relay final the Canadian team beat the United States by almost half a second to win the gold in national record time. Esmie was not originally slated to run with the relay team due to politics; while Esmie was ranked third in Canada before the relay began but as the team was falling apart they decided to replace Carlton Chambers the night before the race after Chambers suffered a groin injury in the 200 m.

Esmie's gold medal was later stolen.

Esmie and the Canadian team won a gold medal again from lane 8 at the 1997 World Championships.

In 2008 he was inducted into Canada's Sports Hall of Fame as part of the 1996 Summer Olympics 4 × 100 relay team.

Esmie now runs AirBlastoff Sports, an athletic training program.
