= Andrea Amici =

Italian sprinter (born 1971)

Personal information
- Nationality: Italian
- Born: 19 October 1971 (age 54)

Sport
- Country: Italy
- Sport: Athletics
- Event: Sprinting
- Club: C.S. Carabinieri
- Retired: 2001

Achievements and titles
- Personal bests: 100 m: 10.28 (1997); 200 m: 20.94 (1997)

Andrea Amici (born 19 October 1971) is an Italian male retired sprinter, which participated, with Italian national track relay team at two editions of the World Championships in Athletics (1993 and 1997).

== Achievements ==
Year	Competition	Venue	Position	Event	Time	Notes
1993	World Championships	(Germany) Stuttgart	Semi	4×100 metres relay	DSQ	
1997	World Championships	(Greece) Athens	Semi	4×100 metres relay	38.77	
1997	European Indoor Championships	(Spain) Valencia	6th	60 metres	6.70	

== National titles ==
He won two times the national championships at senior level.

- Italian Athletics Indoor Championships
  - 60 metres: 1991, 1993
