= Prodromos Katsantonis =

Cypriot sprinter and hurdler (born 1975)

Prodromos Katsantonis (Greek: Πρόδρομος Κατσαντώνης, born 20 October 1975) is a Cypriot sprinter who specialized in the 100 and 200 metres. He is also a former hurdler. In 200 m he finished sixth the 1998 European Indoor Championships and seventh at the 1998 European Championships.

== Personal bests ==
- 100 metres - 10.19 s (2003)
- 200 metres - 20.37 s (1998)
- 110 metres hurdles - 13.92 s (1995)
