= Needy Guims =

French sprinter

Medal record

Men's athletics

Representing France

European Championships
Silver medal – second place	1998 Budapest	4×100 m

Needy Guims (born 8 September 1974 in Chennevières) is a retired French sprinter who specialized in the 100 metres.

At the 1998 European Championships he won a silver medal in 4 x 100 metres relay with teammates Thierry Lubin, Frederic Krantz and Christophe Cheval. As the European champions Great Britain fielded their own World Cup team, the French relay team was selected to represent Europe at the 1998 IAAF World Cup, finishing sixth while Great Britain won the event.

Guims competed in relay at the 1996 and 2000 Summer Olympics as well. His personal best time was 10.20 seconds, achieved in June 1996 in Bondoufle.
