= Ruslan Rusidze =

Georgian sprinter

Personal information
- Nationality: Georgian
- Born: 10 October 1973 (age 52)

Sport
- Sport: Sprinting
- Event: 100 metres

Ruslan Rusidze (born 10 October 1973) is a Georgian sprinter. He competed in the men's 100 metres at the 2000 Summer Olympics.
