= Angelos Pavlakakis =

Greek sprinter (born 1976)

Personal information
- Born: 7 November 1976 (age 49)

Sport
- Country: Greece
- Sport: Athletics
- Event(s): 100 m, 60 m

Achievements and titles
- Personal best(s): 10.11 s, 6.54 s
Medal record
European Indoor Championships
| Gold medal – first place | 1998 Valencia | 60 metres |
| Bronze medal – third place | 2000 Ghent | 60 metres |

Angelos Pavlakakis (Greek: Άγγελος Παυλακάκης; born 7 November 1976 in Xanthi) is a retired Greek sprinter who specialized in the 100 metres.

He won the bronze medal at the 1995 European Junior Championships, the gold medals at the 1997 Mediterranean Games and the 1998 European Indoor Championships and the bronze medal at the 2000 European Indoor Championships. He also competed at the 2000 Olympic Games, the 1997 World Championships and the World Indoor Championships in 1997, 2001 and 2004 without reaching the final.

His personal best time was 10.11 seconds, achieved at the 1997 World Championships in Athens. This is the Greek record.

== International competitions ==
| Year | Competition | Venue | Position | Event | Notes |
Representing Greece
| 1994 | World Junior Championships | Lisbon, Portugal | 11th (sf) | 100m | 10.64 (wind: +1.1 m/s) |
| 1994 | World Junior Championships | Lisbon, Portugal | 11th (h) | 4 × 100 m relay | 41.09 |
| 1995 | European Junior Championships | Nyíregyháza, Hungary | 3rd | 100m | 10.47 |
| 1997 | European U23 Championships | Turku, Finland | 1st | 100 m | 10.18 w (wind: +2.8 m/s) |
| 1997 | Mediterranean Games | Bari, Italy | 1st | 100 m | 10.13 GR |
| 1997 | World Championships | Athens, Greece | 11th (sf) | 100 m | 10.29 |
| 1998 | European Indoor Championships | Valencia, Spain | 1st | 60 m | 6.55 |
| 1998 | European Championships | Budapest, Hungary | 13th (sf) | 100 m | 10.43 |
| 2000 | European Indoor Championships | Ghent, Belgium | 3rd | 60 m | 6.54 PB |
| 2000 | Olympic Games | Sydney, Australia | 9th (sf) | 4 × 100 m relay | 38.80 |
| 2001 | World Indoor Championships | Lisbon, Portugal | 10th (sf) | 60 m | 6.63 |
