= Athletics at the 1993 Summer Universiade – Men's 100 metres =

The men's 100 metres event at the 1993 Summer Universiade was held at the UB Stadium in Buffalo, United States on 14 and 15 July 1993.

== Medalists ==
Gold	Silver	Bronze
Daniel Effiong; Nigeria	Sam Jefferson; United States	Glenroy Gilbert; Canada

== Results ==
=== Heats ===
Wind:
Heat 6: -0.6 m/s

Rank	Heat	Athlete	Nationality	Time	Notes
1	8	Daniel Effiong	Nigeria	10.31	Q
2	8	Kastytis Klimas	Lithuania	10.43	Q
2	9	Tatsuo Sugimoto	Japan	10.43	Q
4	4	Jean-Olivier Zirignon	Ivory Coast	10.44	Q
4	7	Glenroy Gilbert	Canada	10.44	Q
4	8	Jorge Aguilera	Cuba	10.44	Q
7	9	Sam Jefferson	United States	10.48	Q
8	6	Rod Mapstone	Australia	10.52	Q
9	1	Randall Evans	United States	10.53	Q
10	3	Joel Isasi	Cuba	10.55	Q
11	4	Jin Sun-kuk	South Korea	10.58	Q
12	8	David Branle	Belgium	10.60	q
13	3	Peter Ogilvie	Canada	10.61	Q
14	1	Johan Venter	South Africa	10.62	Q
15	1	Ibrahim Meité	Ivory Coast	10.63	Q
16	3	Juan Jesús Trapero	Spain	10.65	Q
16	4	Slava Dolohodin	Ukraine	10.65	Q
18	4	Carlo Occhiena	Italy	10.69	q
18	5	Steve Gookey	Great Britain	10.69	Q
18	7	Victor Omagbemi	Nigeria	10.69	Q
18	9	Óscar Fernández	Peru	10.69	Q
22	7	Oumar Loum	Senegal	10.71	Q
23	5	Rocco Ceselin	Italy	10.76	Q
24	2	Wayne Watson	Jamaica	10.77	Q
25	5	Dmitriy Vanyaikin	Ukraine	10.78	Q
26	3	Sultan Al-Sheib	Qatar	10.79	q
26	5	Miguel Miranda	Mexico	10.79	q
28	6	Frutos Feo	Spain	10.80	Q
28	9	Claude Toukéné-Guébogo	Cameroon	10.80	q
30	7	Alex Fugallo	Great Britain	10.81	
31	9	Tobie Sepe	Central African Republic	10.85	
32	1	Tsai Yi-cheng	Chinese Taipei	10.88	
33	6	Tetsuya Shimada	Japan	10.89	Q
34	6	Bernard Young	Bahamas	10.90	
35	2	Robinson Stewart	Swaziland	10.91	Q
35	8	Ricardo Oliveira	Brazil	10.91	
37	8	David Matos	Puerto Rico	10.92	
38	4	Tseng Hsiao-sheng	Chinese Taipei	10.96	
39	9	Mario Bonello	Malta	10.97	
40	3	Jonathon Moyle	New Zealand	10.99	
41	2	Agner Muñoz	Puerto Rico	11.01	Q
42	2	Leopoldt Vries	South Africa	11.04	
43	1	Olatunde Afilaka	Trinidad and Tobago	11.06	
44	1	Adi Paz	Israel	11.10	
45	5	Paul Ashby	Barbados	11.10	
46	4	Samuel Sey	Ghana	11.11	
47	6	Derry Pemberton	United States Virgin Islands	11.19	
48	4	Stephen Browne	Barbados	11.22	
49	5	Zepee Mberivana	Namibia	11.23	
50	1	Samer Abdelbaki	Jordan	11.26	
50	4	Michael Dzong	Republic of the Congo	11.26	
52	7	Abdullah Kaikai	Sierra Leone	11.30	
53	6	Shahanuddin Chowdhury	Bangladesh	11.35	
54	6	Dale Phillips	Guyana	11.36	
55	2	Jassem Abbas	Qatar	11.48	
56	1	R. Sothilimgam	Sri Lanka	11.54	
57	9	Fidele Kamanzi	Rwanda	11.79	
58	3	Leslie Koroma	Sierra Leone	11.83	
59	8	Cu Thanh Giang	Vietnam	12.02	
60	2	Kokiyolo Somanza	Zaire	13.81	
	3	Mohamed Shah Jalal	Bangladesh	DNF	

=== Quarterfinals ===
Wind:
Heat 1: 0.0 m/s

Rank	Heat	Athlete	Nationality	Time	Notes
1	3	Daniel Effiong	Nigeria	10.28	Q
2	2	Glenroy Gilbert	Canada	10.32	Q
3	1	Jean-Olivier Zirignon	Ivory Coast	10.38	Q
4	1	Sam Jefferson	United States	10.41	Q
5	4	Joel Isasi	Cuba	10.42	Q
6	2	Randall Evans	United States	10.44	Q
6	4	Victor Omagbemi	Nigeria	10.44	Q
8	1	Peter Ogilvie	Canada	10.48	Q
8	4	Kastytis Klimas	Lithuania	10.48	Q
8	4	Tatsuo Sugimoto	Japan	10.48	Q
11	3	Oumar Loum	Senegal	10.49	Q
12	2	Jorge Aguilera	Cuba	10.52	Q
13	1	Rod Mapstone	Australia	10.54	Q
14	3	Steve Gookey	Great Britain	10.58	Q
15	2	Jin Sun-kuk	South Korea	10.59	Q
16	1	Juan Jesús Trapero	Spain	10.63	
17	3	Wayne Watson	Jamaica	10.64	Q
18	1	David Branle	Belgium	10.66	
19	2	Ibrahim Meité	Ivory Coast	10.67	
19	3	Sultan Al-Sheib	Qatar	10.67	
21	3	Dmitriy Vanyaikin	Ukraine	10.68	
22	1	Slava Dolohodin	Ukraine	10.70	
22	3	Rocco Ceselin	Italy	10.70	
24	2	Carlo Occhiena	Italy	10.73	
25	2	Johan Venter	South Africa	10.76	
26	2	Tetsuya Shimada	Japan	10.82	
26	4	Miguel Miranda	Mexico	10.82	
28	4	Óscar Fernández	Peru	10.83	
29	3	Frutos Feo	Spain	10.85	
30	4	Agner Muñoz	Puerto Rico	10.87	
31	1	Claude Toukéné-Guébogo	Cameroon	10.88	
32	4	Robinson Stewart	Swaziland	11.04	

=== Semifinals ===
Wind:
Heat 1: +1.6 m/s, Heat 2: +3.4 m/s

Rank	Heat	Athlete	Nationality	Time	Notes
1	2	Daniel Effiong	Nigeria	10.16	Q
2	2	Joel Isasi	Cuba	10.20	Q
3	1	Glenroy Gilbert	Canada	10.21	Q
3	2	Sam Jefferson	United States	10.21	Q
5	1	Jean-Olivier Zirignon	Ivory Coast	10.24	Q
6	2	Peter Ogilvie	Canada	10.30	Q
7	2	Tatsuo Sugimoto	Japan	10.33	
8	1	Randall Evans	United States	10.36	Q
9	2	Steven Gookey	Great Britain	10.40	
10	2	Wayne Watson	Jamaica	10.40	
11	1	Victor Omagbemi	Nigeria	10.42	Q
12	1	Jorge Aguilera	Cuba	10.50	
12	2	Oumar Loum	Senegal	10.50	
14	1	Jin Sun-kuk	South Korea	10.55	
15	1	Rod Mapstone	Australia	10.56	
16	1	Kastytis Klimas	Lithuania	10.61	

=== Final ===
Wind: +2.6 m/s

Rank	Lane	Athlete	Nationality	Time	Notes
1st place, gold medalist(s)	5	Daniel Effiong	Nigeria	10.07	
2nd place, silver medalist(s)	3	Sam Jefferson	United States	10.13	
3rd place, bronze medalist(s)	4	Glenroy Gilbert	Canada	10.14	
4	6	Joel Isasi	Cuba	10.17	
5	1	Jean-Olivier Zirignon	Ivory Coast	10.24	
6	4	Victor Omagbemi	Nigeria	10.26	
7	7	Peter Ogilvie	Canada	10.36	
8	8	Randall Evans	United States	11.79	
