= 1990 World Junior Championships in Athletics – Men's 100 metres =

The men's 100 metres event at the 1990 World Junior Championships in Athletics was held in Plovdiv, Bulgaria, at Deveti Septemvri Stadium on 8 and 9 August.

== Medalists ==
Gold	Davidson Ezinwa; Nigeria
Silver	Jason Livingston; United Kingdom
Bronze	Rodney Bridges; United States

== Results ==
=== Final ===
9 August
Wind: +0.6 m/s

Rank	Name	Nationality	Time	Notes
1st place, gold medalist(s)	Davidson Ezinwa	Nigeria	10.17	
2nd place, silver medalist(s)	Jason Livingston	United Kingdom	10.25	
3rd place, bronze medalist(s)	Rodney Bridges	United States	10.37	
4	Jason John	United Kingdom	10.40	
5	Donovan Powell	Jamaica	10.44	
6	Damien Marsh	Australia	10.46	
7	Innocent Asonze	Nigeria	10.50	
8	Edgar Chourio	Venezuela	10.59	

=== Semifinals ===
9 August

==== Semifinal 1 ====
Wind: +2.1 m/s

Rank	Name	Nationality	Time	Notes
1	Innocent Asonze	Nigeria	10.30 w	Q
2	Rodney Bridges	United States	10.35 w	Q
3	Donovan Powell	Jamaica	10.37 w	Q
4	Jason John	United Kingdom	10.38 w	Q
5	Andrea Amici	Italy	10.45 w	
6	Christian Konieczny	West Germany	10.50 w	
7	Peter Ogilvie	Canada	10.54 w	
8	Stefaan Allemeersh	Belgium	10.63 w	

==== Semifinal 2 ====
Wind: +0.7 m/s

Rank	Name	Nationality	Time	Notes
1	Davidson Ezinwa	Nigeria	10.30	Q
2	Jason Livingston	United Kingdom	10.35	Q
3	Damien Marsh	Australia	10.47	Q
4	Edgar Chourio	Venezuela	10.49	Q
5	Satoru Inoue	Japan	10.57	
6	Curtis Johnson	United States	10.60	
7	Konstantin Gromadskiy	Soviet Union	10.65	
8	Clinton Bufuku	Zambia	11.52	

=== Quarterfinals ===
8 August

==== Quarterfinal 1 ====
Wind: -2.1 m/s

Rank	Name	Nationality	Time	Notes
1	Innocent Asonze	Nigeria	10.49	Q
2	Curtis Johnson	United States	10.64	Q
3	Christian Konieczny	West Germany	10.67	Q
4	Peter Ogilvie	Canada	10.75	Q
5	Paul Henderson	Australia	10.83	
6	Giorgio Marras	Italy	11.01	
7	Plamen Stoyanov	Bulgaria	11.04	
8	Roman Galkin	Soviet Union	11.05	

==== Quarterfinal 2 ====
Wind: -1.4 m/s

Rank	Name	Nationality	Time	Notes
1	Davidson Ezinwa	Nigeria	10.46	Q
2	Damien Marsh	Australia	10.57	Q
3	Andrea Amici	Italy	10.59	Q
4	Jason John	United Kingdom	10.59	Q
5	Gilles Bogui	Côte d'Ivoire	10.66	
6	Patrick Mistocco	France	10.73	
7	Hirokazu Sato	Japan	10.76	
8	Laurent Kemp	Luxembourg	10.98	

==== Quarterfinal 3 ====
Wind: +0.5 m/s

Rank	Name	Nationality	Time	Notes
1	Rodney Bridges	United States	10.38	Q
2	Jason Livingston	United Kingdom	10.38	Q
3	Edgar Chourio	Venezuela	10.53	Q
4	Stefaan Allemeersh	Belgium	10.65	Q
5	Jean-Olivier Zirignon	Côte d'Ivoire	10.66	
6	Joel Lamela	Cuba	10.72	
7	José Carlos Rivas	Spain	10.73	
8	Christoph Pöstinger	Austria	10.80	

==== Quarterfinal 4 ====
Wind: -1.8 m/s

Rank	Name	Nationality	Time	Notes
1	Donovan Powell	Jamaica	10.50	Q
2	Satoru Inoue	Japan	10.61	Q
3	Konstantin Gromadskiy	Soviet Union	10.67	Q
4	Clinton Bufuku	Zambia	10.68	Q
5	Ricardo Greenidge	Canada	10.69	
6	Leonardo Prevot	Cuba	10.69	
7	Reinaldo Santana	Venezuela	10.77	
8	Peter Oldin	Sweden	10.80	

=== Heats ===
8 August

==== Heat 1 ====
Wind: -1.0 m/s

Rank	Name	Nationality	Time	Notes
1	Edgar Chourio	Venezuela	10.53	Q
2	Damien Marsh	Australia	10.66	Q
2	Christian Konieczny	West Germany	10.66	Q
4	Peter Ogilvie	Canada	10.72	Q
5	Jean-Olivier Zirignon	Côte d'Ivoire	10.80	q
6	Raymond Nelson	Jamaica	10.87	
6	Alexander Lack	East Germany	10.87	
8	Getachew Legesse	Ethiopia	11.10	

==== Heat 2 ====
Wind: +2.0 m/s

Rank	Name	Nationality	Time	Notes
1	Davidson Ezinwa	Nigeria	10.45	Q
2	Jason John	United Kingdom	10.53	Q
3	Paul Henderson	Australia	10.54	Q
4	Reinaldo Santana	Venezuela	10.67	Q
5	Laurent Kemp	Luxembourg	10.78	q
6	Eugene Farrell	Ireland	10.85	
7	Franck Zio	Burkina Faso	11.11	
8	Bothloke Shebe	Lesotho	11.21	

==== Heat 3 ====
Wind: -0.1 m/s

Rank	Name	Nationality	Time	Notes
1	Rodney Bridges	United States	10.50	Q
2	Donovan Powell	Jamaica	10.52	Q
3	Giorgio Marras	Italy	10.65	Q
4	José Carlos Rivas	Spain	10.66	Q
5	Peter Oldin	Sweden	10.78	q
6	Plamen Stoyanov	Bulgaria	10.80	q
7	Garib Tahir	Sudan	11.69	

==== Heat 4 ====
Wind: -0.9 m/s

Rank	Name	Nationality	Time	Notes
1	Innocent Asonze	Nigeria	10.43	Q
2	Hirokazu Sato	Japan	10.85	Q
3	Christoph Pöstinger	Austria	10.87	Q
4	Ricardo Greenidge	Canada	10.93	Q
5	Darren Haddock	Ireland	10.99	
6	Jari Haverinen	Finland	11.03	
7	Zepee Mberiuana	Namibia	11.10	
8	Yeóryios Papadópoulos	Greece	11.18	

==== Heat 5 ====
Wind: -0.2 m/s

Rank	Name	Nationality	Time	Notes
1	Curtis Johnson	United States	10.54	Q
2	Andrea Amici	Italy	10.58	Q
3	Joel Lamela	Cuba	10.66	Q
4	Roman Galkin	Soviet Union	10.74	Q
5	Torbjörn Eriksson	Sweden	10.88	
6	Anninos Marcoullides	Cyprus	10.90	
7	Konstadínos Koutsoumbas	Greece	10.93	
8	Martin Frick	Liechtenstein	11.14	

==== Heat 6 ====
Wind: +0.7 m/s

Rank	Name	Nationality	Time	Notes
1	Leonardo Prevot	Cuba	10.51	Q
2	Satoru Inoue	Japan	10.58	Q
3	Stefaan Allemeersh	Belgium	10.62	Q
4	Gilles Bogui	Côte d'Ivoire	10.63	Q
5	Adrian Bobb	Trinidad and Tobago	10.99	
6	Aleksandar Popović	Yugoslavia	11.01	
7	Marvin Bennett	Saint Kitts and Nevis	11.21	
8	Mark Sullivan	Malta	11.77	

==== Heat 7 ====
Wind: +0.4 m/s

Rank	Name	Nationality	Time	Notes
1	Jason Livingston	United Kingdom	10.55	Q
2	Konstantin Gromadskiy	Soviet Union	10.60	Q
3	Clinton Bufuku	Zambia	10.66	Q
4	Patrick Mistocco	France	10.67	Q
5	Julio César de Prado	Spain	10.84	
6	Alexander Rehm	West Germany	10.85	
7	Adi Paz	Israel	10.93	
8	Marco Ortíz	Bolivia	11.16	

== Participation ==
According to an unofficial count, 55 athletes from 38 countries participated in the event.

- Australia (2)
- Austria (1)
- Belgium (1)
- Bolivia (1)
- Bulgaria (1)
- Burkina Faso (1)
- Canada (2)
- Côte d'Ivoire (2)
- Cuba (2)
- Cyprus (1)
- East Germany (1)
- Ethiopia (1)
- Finland (1)
- France (1)
- Greece (2)
- Ireland (2)
- Israel (1)
- Italy (2)
- Jamaica (2)
- Japan (2)
- Lesotho (1)
- Liechtenstein (1)
- Luxembourg (1)
- Malta (1)
- Namibia (1)
- Nigeria (2)
- Saint Kitts and Nevis (1)
- Soviet Union (2)
- Spain (2)
- Sudan (1)
- Sweden (2)
- Trinidad and Tobago (1)
- United Kingdom (2)
- United States (2)
- Venezuela (2)
- West Germany (2)
- Yugoslavia (1)
- Zambia (1)
