= Athletics at the 1993 Summer Universiade – Men's 4 × 100 metres relay =

The men's 4 × 100 metres relay event at the 1993 Summer Universiade was held at the UB Stadium in Buffalo, United States on 17 and 18 July 1993.

== Medalists ==
Gold	Silver	Bronze
United States; Bryan Bridgewater; David Oaks; Tony Miller; Sam Jefferson	Japan; Satoru Inoue; Tatsuo Sugimoto; Hideaki Miyata; Hisatsugu Suzuki	Cuba; Joel Isasi; Joel Lamela; Jorge Aguilera; Iván García

== Results ==
=== Heats ===
Rank	Heat	Nation	Athletes	Time	Notes
1	3	United States	Bryan Bridgewater, David Oaks, Tony Miller, Sam Jefferson	39.28	Q
2	2	Japan	Satoru Inoue, Tatsuo Sugimoto, Hideaki Miyata, Hisatsugu Suzuki	39.54	Q
3	3	Canada	Michael Viers, Glenroy Gilbert, O'Brian Gibbons, Peter Ogilvie	39.71	Q
4	2	Ivory Coast	Franck Waota, Jean-Olivier Zirignon, Hyacinthe Kamelan, Ibrahim Meité	39.76	Q
5	2	Cuba	Joel Isasi, Joel Lamela, Jorge Aguilera, Iván García	39.84	q
6	1	Bahamas	Andrew Tynes, Dwight Ferguson, Renward Wells, Bernard Young	39.87	Q
7	2	Italy	Alessandro Meli, Rocco Ceselin, Carlo Occhiena, Alessandro Orlandi	40.22	q
8	3	Spain	Frutos Feo, Juan Jesús Trapero, Jordi Mayoral, Manuel Moreno	40.22	q
9	3	Puerto Rico	Rosendo Rivera, Carlos Santos, Agner Muñoz, David Matos	40.59	
10	1	Great Britain	Alex Fugallo, Michael Afilaka, Steven Gookey, Owusu Dako	40.62	
11	3	Chinese Taipei	Tsai Yi-cheng, Chen Fang-cheng, Tseng Hsiao-sheng, ?	41.30	
12	1	Mexico	Luis Hinestroza, Miguel Miranda, Genaro Rojas, Jaime López	41.43	
	2	Sierra Leone	Almamy Farma, Ibrahim Munu, Leslie Koroma, Abdullah Kaikai	DQ	

=== Final ===
Rank	Nation	Athletes	Time	Notes
1st place, gold medalist(s)	United States	Bryan Bridgewater, David Oaks, Tony Miller, Sam Jefferson	38.65	
2nd place, silver medalist(s)	Japan	Satoru Inoue, Tatsuo Sugimoto, Hideaki Miyata, Hisatsugu Suzuki	38.97	
3rd place, bronze medalist(s)	Cuba	Joel Isasi, Joel Lamela, Jorge Aguilera, Iván García	39.20	
4	Canada	O'Brian Gibbons, Glenroy Gilbert, Peter Ogilvie, Michael Viers	39.41	
5	Bahamas	Dwight Ferguson, Renward Wells, Andrew Tynes, Bernard Young	39.77	
6	Spain	Juan Jesús Trapero, Jordi Mayoral, Frutos Feo, Manuel Moreno	39.88	
7	Italy	Alessandro Meli, Rocco Ceselin, Carlo Occhiena, Alessandro Orlandi	40.03	
	Ivory Coast	Hyacinthe Kamelan, Ibrahim Meité, Franck Waota, Jean-Olivier Zirignon	DQ	
