= Athletics at the 1992 Summer Olympics – Men's 4 × 100 metres relay =

Official Video

These are the official results of the men's 4 × 100 metres relay event at the 1992 Summer Olympics in Barcelona, Spain. There were a total number of 25 nations competing.

== Medalists ==
Gold	Silver	Bronze
United States; Michael Marsh; Leroy Burrell; Dennis Mitchell; Carl Lewis; James Jett*	Nigeria; Oluyemi Kayode; Chidi Imoh; Olapade Adeniken; Davidson Ezinwa; Osmond Ezinwa*	Cuba; Andrés Simón; Joel Lamela; Joel Isasi; Jorge Aguilera

* Athletes who participated in the heats only and received medals.

== Records ==
These were the standing world and Olympic records (in seconds) prior to the 1992 Summer Olympics.

World record	37.50	(United States) Carl Lewis (United States) Andre Cason (United States) Dennis Mitchell (United States) Leroy Burrell	Tokyo (JPN)	September 1, 1991
Olympic record	37.83	(United States) Sam Graddy (United States) Ron Brown (United States) Calvin Smith (United States) Carl Lewis	Los Angeles (USA)	August 11, 1984

The United States set a new world record in the final.

== Final ==
- Held on August 8, 1992

RANK	NATION	ATHLETES	TIME
	United States	• Michael Marsh • Leroy Burrell • Dennis Mitchell • Carl Lewis	37.40; WR
	Nigeria	• Oluyemi Kayode • Chidi Imoh • Olapade Adeniken • Davidson Ezinwa	37.98
	Cuba	• Andrés Simón • Joel Lamela • Joel Isasi • Jorge Aguilera	38.00
4.	Great Britain	• Marcus Adam • Tony Jarrett • John Regis • Linford Christie	38.08
5.	Unified Team	• Pavel Galkin • Edvin Ivanov • Andrey Fedoriv • Vitaliy Savin	38.17
6.	Japan	• Shinji Aoto • Hisatsugu Suzuki • Satoru Inoue • Tatsuo Sugimoto	38.77
7.	Austria	• Christoph Pöstinger • Thomas Renner • Andreas Berger • Franz Ratzenberger	39.30
8.	Ivory Coast	• Frank Waota • Jean-Olivier Zirignon • Gilles Bogui • Ouattara Lagazane	39.31

== Semifinals ==
- Heat 1

RANK	NATION	ATHLETES	TIME
1.	United States	• Michael Marsh • Leroy Burrell • Dennis Mitchell • Carl Lewis	38.14
2.	Cuba	• Andrés Simón • Joel Lamela • Joel Isasi • Jorge Aguilera	38.49
3.	Unified Team	• Pavel Galkin • Edvin Ivanov • Andrey Fedoriv • Vitaliy Savin	38.69
4.	Japan	• Shinji Aoto • Hisatsugu Suzuki • Satoru Inoue • Tatsuo Sugimoto	38.81
5.	France	• Max Morinière • Daniel Sangouma • Gilles Quénéhervé • Bruno Marie-Rose	39.02
6.	Ghana	• John Myles-Mills • Eric Akogyiram • Emmanuel Tuffour • Samuel Nelson Boateng	39.28
7.	Sierra Leone	• Francis Keita • Denton Guy-Williams • Paul Parkinson • Sanusi Turay	40.46
—	Mexico	• Genaro Rojas • Eduardo Nava • Raymundo Escalante • Alejandro Cárdenas	DSQ

- Heat 2

RANK	NATION	ATHLETES	TIME
1.	Nigeria	• Oluyemi Kayode • Chidi Imoh • Olapade Adeniken • Davidson Ezinwa	38.21
2.	Great Britain	• Tony Jarrett • John Regis • Marcus Adam • Linford Christie	38.64
3.	Austria	• Christoph Pöstinger • Thomas Renner • Andreas Berger • Franz Ratzenberger	39.34
4.	Ivory Coast	• Frank Waota • Jean-Olivier Zirignon • Gilles Bogui • Ouattara Lagazane	39.46
5.	Spain	• Javier Arqués • Enrique Talavera • Juan Trapero • Sergio López	39.62
6.	Thailand	• Kriengkrai Nalom • Seksarn Boonrat • Niti Piyapan • Visut Watanasin	39.73
7.	Togo	• Kouami Aholou • Boevi Youlou Lawson • Kokou Franck Amegnigan • Kossi Akoto	39.84
—	Canada	• Ben Johnson • Glenroy Gilbert • Atlee Mahorn • Bruny Surin	DNF

== Heats ==
First 3 teams of each heat (Q) and the next 4 fastest (q) qualified for the final.

Rank	Heat	Nation	Athletes	Time	Notes
1	1	Cuba	Andrés Simón, Joel Lamela, Joel Isasi, Jorge Aguilera	38.81	Q
2	1	United States	Michael Marsh, Leroy Burrell, Dennis Mitchell, James Jett	38.95	Q
3	4	Nigeria	Osmond Ezinwa, Chidi Imoh, Olapade Adeniken, Davidson Ezinwa	38.98	Q
4	1	Japan	Shinji Aoto, Hisatsugu Suzuki, Satoru Inoue, Tatsuo Sugimoto	39.16	Q
5	3	Canada	Ben Johnson, Glenroy Gilbert, Peter Ogilvie, Bruny Surin	39.34	Q
6	2	France	Max Morinière, Daniel Sangouma, Gilles Quénéhervé, Bruno Marie-Rose	39.49	Q
7	4	Spain	Javier Arqués, Enrique Talavera, Juan Trapero, Sergio López	39.60	Q
8	3	Great Britain	Tony Jarrett, Jason John, Marcus Adam, Linford Christie	39.73	Q
9	1	Mexico	Genaro Rojas, Eduardo Nava, Raymundo Escalante, Alejandro Cárdenas	39.77	q
10	1	Togo	Kouame Aholou, Boevi Youlou Lawson, Kokou Franck Amegnigan, Kossi Akoto	39.77	q
11	3	Austria	Christoph Pöstinger, Thomas Renner, Andreas Berger, Franz Ratzenberger	39.86	Q
12	4	Thailand	Kriengkrai Narom, Seksarn Boonrat, Niti Piyapan, Visut Watanasin	39.91	Q
13	1	Ivory Coast	Frank Waota, Jean-Olivier Zirignon, Gilles Bogui, Ouattara Lagazane	40.02	q
14	2	Unified Team	Pavel Galkin, Edvin Ivanov, Andrey Fedoriv, Vitaliy Savin	40.07	Q
15	2	Sierra Leone	Francis Keita, Denton Guy-Williams, Paul Parkinson, Sanusi Turay	40.11	Q
16	3	Ghana	John Myles-Mills, Eric Akogyiram, Emmanuel Tuffour, Samuel Nelson Boateng	40.11	q
17	2	Senegal	Charles-Louis Seck, Amadou Mbaye, Seynou Loum, Oumar Loum	40.13	
18	2	Portugal	Luís Cunha, Pedro Curvelo, Luís Barroso, Pedro Agostinho	40.30	
19	3	Virgin Islands	Derry Pemberton, Neville Hodge, Mitchell Peters, Wyndell Dickinson	40.48	
20	3	The Gambia	Dawda Jallow, Momodou Sarr, Abdulieh Janneh, Lamin Marikong	40.98	
21	4	San Marino	Nicola Selva, Manlio Molinari, Dominique Canti, Aldo Canti	42.08	
22	4	Bangladesh	Golam Ambia, Mehdi Hasan, Shahanuddin Choudhury, Shah Jalal	42.18	
	1	Belize	Emery Gill, Elston Shaw, Michael Joseph, John Palacio	DQ	
	2	Republic of the Congo	Medard Makanga, Michael Dzong, Armand Biniakounou, David N'Koua	DQ	
	4	Jamaica	Michael Green, Rudolph Mighty, Anthony Wallace, Ray Stewart	DNF	

== See also ==
- 1990 Men's European Championships 4 × 100 m Relay (Split)
- 1991 Men's World Championships 4 × 100 m Relay (Tokyo)
- 1993 Men's World Championships 4 × 100 m Relay (Stuttgart)
- 1994 Men's European Championships 4 × 100 m Relay (Helsinki)
