= 1990 World Junior Championships in Athletics – Men's 4 × 100 metres relay =

1990 relay event

The men's 4×100 metres relay event at the 1990 World Junior Championships in Athletics was held in Plovdiv, Bulgaria, at Deveti Septemvri Stadium on 11 and 12 August.

== Medalists ==
Gold	Chris Nelloms; Rodney Bridges; Reggie Harris; James Stallworth; United States
Silver	Sergejs Insakovs; Konstantin Gromadskiy; Vitaliy Semyonov; Aleksandr Goremykin; Soviet Union
Bronze	Innocent Asonze; Davidson Ezinwa; Nnamdi Anusim; Osmond Ezinwa; Nigeria

== Results ==
=== Final ===
12 August

Rank	Nation	Competitors	Time	Notes
1st place, gold medalist(s)	United States	Chris Nelloms; Rodney Bridges; Reggie Harris; James Stallworth	39.13	
2nd place, silver medalist(s)	Soviet Union	Sergejs Insakovs; Konstantin Gromadskiy; Vitaliy Semyonov; Aleksandr Goremykin	39.58	
3rd place, bronze medalist(s)	Nigeria	Innocent Asonze; Davidson Ezinwa; Nnamdi Anusim; Osmond Ezinwa	39.68	
4	United Kingdom	Jason Livingston; Mark Smith; Michael Williams; Jason John	39.78	
5	West Germany	Andreas Schofer; Marlo Pfeiler; Christian Konieczny; Marcus Skupin-Alfa	39.88	
6	Italy	Andrea Amici; Alessandro Orlandi; Paolo Carniel; Giorgio Marras	39.92	
7	Jamaica	Norman Morse; Raymond Nelson; Daniel England; Donovan Powell	40.06	
8	Cuba	Leonardo Prevot; Joel Lamela; Ernesto González; Pedro Piñera	40.25	

=== Heats ===
11 August

==== Heat 1 ====
Rank	Nation	Competitors	Time	Notes
1	United States	Chris Nelloms; Rodney Bridges; Reggie Harris; James Stallworth	39.16	Q
2	Cuba	Leonardo Prevot; Joel Lamela; Ernesto González; Pedro Piñera	40.31	Q
3	Australia	Paul Henderson; Damien Marsh; Chris Aston; Jason Vietch	40.71	
4	Canada	Thomas Zverina; Ricardo Greenidge; Peter Ogilvie; Gary Reid	41.88	
	Spain	Carlos Pérez; Julio César de Prado; Juan Jesús Puigmarti; José Carlos Rivas	DNF	

==== Heat 2 ====
Rank	Nation	Competitors	Time	Notes
1	Nigeria	Innocent Asonze; Davidson Ezinwa; Nnamdi Anusim; Osmond Ezinwa	39.86	Q
2	Jamaica	Norman Morse; Raymond Nelson; Daniel England; Donovan Powell	40.04	Q
3	Italy	Andrea Amici; Alessandro Orlandi; Paolo Carniel; Giorgio Marras	40.08	q
4	Japan	Hirokazu Sato; Satoru Inoue; Yasutaka Hattori; Yusuke Horikoshi	40.55	
5	France	Stéphane Cali; Patrick Mistocco; Pascal Irdor; Willy Seymour	40.70	
6	Greece	Mihaíl Makrís; Aléxios Alexópoulos; Konstadínos Koutsoumbas; Yeóryios Papadópoulos	41.00	

==== Heat 3 ====
Rank	Nation	Competitors	Time	Notes
1	Soviet Union	Sergejs Insakovs; Konstantin Gromadskiy; Vitaliy Semyonov; Aleksandr Goremykin	39.53	Q
2	United Kingdom	Jason Livingston; Mark Smith; Michael Williams; Jason John	39.88	Q
3	West Germany	Andreas Schofer; Marlo Pfeiler; Christian Konieczny; Marcus Skupin-Alfa	39.91	q
4	Venezuela	Edgardo Arrieta; Eliecer Pulgar; Edgar Chourio; Reinaldo Santana	40.60	
5	Ireland	Tom Comyns; Darren Haddock; Geoffrey Pamplon; Eugene Farrell	41.31	
	Bulgaria	Pavlin Plugchiev; Stoyan Manolev; Plamen Stoyanov; Stanislav Georgiev	DQ	

== Participation ==
According to an unofficial count, 68 athletes from 17 countries participated in the event.

- Australia (4)
- Bulgaria (4)
- Canada (4)
- Cuba (4)
- France (4)
- Greece (4)
- Ireland (4)
- Italy (4)
- Jamaica (4)
- Japan (4)
- Nigeria (4)
- Soviet Union (4)
- Spain (4)
- United Kingdom (4)
- United States (4)
- Venezuela (4)
- West Germany (4)
