= 1990 World Junior Championships in Athletics – Men's 200 metres =

The men's 200 metres event at the 1990 World Junior Championships in Athletics was held in Plovdiv, Bulgaria, at Deveti Septemvri Stadium on 10 and 11 August.

== Medalists ==
Gold	Aleksandr Goremykin; Soviet Union
Silver	Davidson Ezinwa; Nigeria
Bronze	James Stallworth; United States

== Results ==
=== Final ===
11 August
Wind: -0.5 m/s

Rank	Name	Nationality	Time	Notes
1st place, gold medalist(s)	Aleksandr Goremykin	Soviet Union	20.47	
2nd place, silver medalist(s)	Davidson Ezinwa	Nigeria	20.75	
3rd place, bronze medalist(s)	James Stallworth	United States	20.81	
4	Osmond Ezinwa	Nigeria	21.06	
5	Peter Ogilvie	Canada	21.08	
6	Martin Kock	West Germany	21.18	
7	Paul Henderson	Australia	21.24	
8	Mark Smith	United Kingdom	21.25	

=== Semifinals ===
10 August

==== Semifinal 1 ====
Wind: +0.6 m/s

Rank	Name	Nationality	Time	Notes
1	Davidson Ezinwa	Nigeria	20.97	Q
2	Paul Henderson	Australia	21.05	Q
3	Gilles Bogui	Côte d'Ivoire	21.23	
4	Vitaliy Semyonov	Soviet Union	21.25	
5	Torbjörn Eriksson	Sweden	21.26	
6	Alexander Lack	East Germany	21.61	
7	Paolo Carniel	Italy	21.63	
8	Zepee Mberiuana	Namibia	21.97	

==== Semifinal 2 ====
Wind: -0.8 m/s

Rank	Name	Nationality	Time	Notes
1	James Stallworth	United States	20.73	Q
2	Osmond Ezinwa	Nigeria	20.91	Q
3	Mark Smith	United Kingdom	21.16	q
4	Marcus Skupin-Alfa	West Germany	21.52	
5	Andrew Tynes	Bahamas	21.57	
6	Stefaan Allemeersh	Belgium	21.77	
7	Ricardo Greenidge	Canada	21.79	
	Osamu Kanomata	Japan	DNF	

==== Semifinal 3 ====
Wind: +0.9 m/s

Rank	Name	Nationality	Time	Notes
1	Aleksandr Goremykin	Soviet Union	20.91	Q
2	Martin Kock	West Germany	21.17	Q
3	Peter Ogilvie	Canada	21.21	q
4	Cameron Taylor	New Zealand	21.23	
5	Nilton Messias	Brazil	21.46	
6	Elgin Gordon	United States	21.53	
7	Michael Williams	United Kingdom	21.68	
8	Stoyan Manolev	Bulgaria	21.77	

=== Heats ===
10 August

==== Heat 1 ====
Wind: +0.5 m/s

Rank	Name	Nationality	Time	Notes
1	Davidson Ezinwa	Nigeria	21.01	Q
2	Paul Henderson	Australia	21.17	Q
3	Cameron Taylor	New Zealand	21.32	q
4	Michael Williams	United Kingdom	21.46	q
5	Torbjörn Eriksson	Sweden	21.52	q
6	Adi Paz	Israel	22.37	
7	Franck Zio	Burkina Faso	22.66	

==== Heat 2 ====
Wind: +0.6 m/s

Rank	Name	Nationality	Time	Notes
1	James Stallworth	United States	21.08	Q
2	Martin Kock	West Germany	21.26	Q
3	Stoyan Manolev	Bulgaria	21.60	q
4	Anninos Marcoullides	Cyprus	21.88	
5	Carl Casey	Antigua and Barbuda	21.96	
6	Getachew Legesse	Ethiopia	22.18	

==== Heat 3 ====
Wind: -0.5 m/s

Rank	Name	Nationality	Time	Notes
1	Aleksandr Goremykin	Soviet Union	21.16	Q
2	Elgin Gordon	United States	21.76	Q
3	Chris Aston	Australia	21.96	
4	Reinaldo Santana	Venezuela	22.07	
5	Carles Franques	Spain	22.10	
6	Jari Haverinen	Finland	22.16	
7	Laurent Kemp	Luxembourg	22.46	
8	Feye Girma	Ethiopia	24.09	

==== Heat 4 ====
Wind: +0.8 m/s

Rank	Name	Nationality	Time	Notes
1	Nilton Messias	Brazil	21.39	Q
2	Peter Ogilvie	Canada	21.57	Q
3	Stefaan Allemeersh	Belgium	21.79	q
4	Konstadínos Koutsoumbas	Greece	21.91	
5	Joel Lamela	Cuba	22.09	
6	Julio Caballero	Paraguay	22.74	
7	Foday Sillah	Sierra Leone	23.02	

==== Heat 5 ====
Wind: -0.4 m/s

Rank	Name	Nationality	Time	Notes
1	Mark Smith	United Kingdom	21.18	Q
2	Vitaliy Semyonov	Soviet Union	21.30	Q
3	Gilles Bogui	Côte d'Ivoire	21.33	q
4	Marcus Skupin-Alfa	West Germany	21.45	q
5	Ricardo Greenidge	Canada	21.57	q
6	Aleksandar Popović	Yugoslavia	22.06	
7	Martin Frick	Liechtenstein	22.28	

==== Heat 6 ====
Wind: +0.4 m/s

Rank	Name	Nationality	Time	Notes
1	Osmond Ezinwa	Nigeria	21.39	Q
2	Alexander Lack	East Germany	21.51	Q
3	Osamu Kanomata	Japan	21.80	q
4	Juan Jesús Puigmarti	Spain	21.95	
5	Mark Noreiga	Trinidad and Tobago	22.08	
6	Garib Tahir	Sudan	24.08	

==== Heat 7 ====
Wind: -1.4 m/s

Rank	Name	Nationality	Time	Notes
1	Andrew Tynes	Bahamas	21.56	Q
2	Zepee Mberiuana	Namibia	21.62	Q
3	Paolo Carniel	Italy	21.74	q
4	Diene Ndiaye	Senegal	22.73	
5	Bothloke Shebe	Lesotho	22.74	
6	Mark Sullivan	Malta	23.59	

== Participation ==
According to an unofficial count, 47 athletes from 38 countries participated in the event.

- Antigua and Barbuda (1)
- Australia (2)
- Bahamas (1)
- Belgium (1)
- Brazil (1)
- Bulgaria (1)
- Burkina Faso (1)
- Canada (2)
- Côte d'Ivoire (1)
- Cuba (1)
- Cyprus (1)
- East Germany (1)
- Ethiopia (2)
- Finland (1)
- Greece (1)
- Israel (1)
- Italy (1)
- Japan (1)
- Lesotho (1)
- Liechtenstein (1)
- Luxembourg (1)
- Malta (1)
- Namibia (1)
- New Zealand (1)
- Nigeria (2)
- Paraguay (1)
- Senegal (1)
- Sierra Leone (1)
- Soviet Union (2)
- Spain (2)
- Sudan (1)
- Sweden (1)
- Trinidad and Tobago (1)
- United Kingdom (2)
- United States (2)
- Venezuela (1)
- West Germany (2)
- Yugoslavia (1)
