= Athletics at the 1993 Summer Universiade – Men's 200 metres =

The men's 200 metres event at the 1993 Summer Universiade was held at the UB Stadium in Buffalo, United States on 16 and 17 July 1993.

== Medalists ==
Gold	Silver	Bronze
Bryan Bridgewater; United States	Chris Nelloms; United States	Iván García; Cuba

== Results ==
=== Heats ===
Wind:
Heat 3: +4.4 m/s, Heat 8: -1.6 m/s

Rank	Heat	Athlete	Nationality	Time	Notes
1	7	Iván García	Cuba	20.67	Q
2	2	Glenroy Gilbert	Canada	20.80	Q
3	6	Chris Nelloms	United States	20.83	Q
4	4	Sergejs Inšakovs	Latvia	20.95	Q
5	6	Oumar Loum	Senegal	20.97	Q
6	1	Andrew Tynes	Bahamas	21.04	Q
7	2	Carlo Occhiena	Italy	21.08	Q
8	6	Konstadinos Kederis	Greece	21.09	Q
8	7	O'Brian Gibbons	Canada	21.09	Q
10	8	Satoru Inoue	Japan	21.17	Q
11	1	Owusu Dako	Great Britain	21.20	Q
11	7	Franck Waota	Ivory Coast	21.20	Q
11	7	Hideaki Miyata	Japan	21.20	q
14	4	Jordi Mayoral	Spain	21.26	Q
15	1	Manuel Moreno	Spain	21.28	Q
16	7	Robinson Stewart	Swaziland	21.38	q
17	4	Derry Pemberton	United States Virgin Islands	21.40	Q
18	3	Sylvanus Hepburn	Bahamas	21.44	Q
19	3	Pascal Irdor	France	21.45	Q
20	3	Mark Ladbrook	Australia	21.47	Q
21	2	Michael Afilaka	Great Britain	21.48	Q
22	5	Bryan Bridgewater	United States	21.51	Q
23	3	Carlos Santos	Puerto Rico	21.57	q
23	8	Anthony Ryan	Australia	21.57	Q
25	1	Leopoldt Vries	South Africa	21.61	q
26	6	Ricardo Oliveira	Brazil	21.62	q
27	3	Roberto Tirino	Italy	21.71	q
28	4	Zepee Mberivana	Namibia	21.74	q
29	2	Masoud Khamis Rahman	Qatar	21.76	q
30	5	László Kiss	Hungary	21.78	Q
31	8	Tsvetoslav Stankulov	Bulgaria	21.80	Q
32	5	Tsai Yi-cheng	Chinese Taipei	21.83	Q
33	2	David Branle	Belgium	21.86	
34	4	Samuel Sey	Ghana	21.93	
35	3	Sergey Lopatkin	Azerbaijan	22.05	
36	4	Jaime López	Mexico	22.10	
37	5	Arnold Payne	Zimbabwe	22.11	
38	1	Tseng Hsiao-sheng	Chinese Taipei	22.20	
39	7	Stephen Browne	Barbados	22.22	
40	6	Adi Paz	Israel	22.28	
41	5	Paul Ashby	Barbados	22.29	
42	7	Mario Bonello	Malta	22.32	
43	8	Luis Hinestroza	Mexico	22.37	
44	2	Claude Toukéné-Guébogo	Cameroon	22.42	
45	7	Michael Dzong	Republic of the Congo	22.72	
46	8	Abdullah Kaikai	Sierra Leone	22.76	
47	2	R. Sothilimgam	Sri Lanka	22.86	
48	8	Thomas Mbeeli	Namibia	22.87	
49	5	Vladimir Platonov	Russia	22.98	
50	6	Dale Phillips	Guyana	23.56	
51	1	Cu Thanh Giang	Vietnam	24.25	

=== Quarterfinals ===
Wind:
Heat 1: +2.3 m/s, Heat 2: +3.4 m/s, Heat 3: +3.5 m/s, Heat 4: ? m/s

Rank	Heat	Athlete	Nationality	Time	Notes
1	2	Chris Nelloms	United States	20.52	Q
2	4	Bryan Bridgewater	United States	20.66	Q
3	4	Iván García	Cuba	20.79	Q
4	1	Glenroy Gilbert	Canada	20.80	Q
5	3	Andrew Tynes	Bahamas	20.82	Q
6	3	Sergejs Inšakovs	Latvia	20.93	Q
7	2	Satoru Inoue	Japan	20.97	Q
8	3	Mark Ladbrook	Australia	21.02	Q
9	2	O'Brian Gibbons	Canada	21.06	Q
10	3	Jordi Mayoral	Spain	21.07	Q
11	4	Oumar Loum	Senegal	21.10	Q
12	3	Owusu Dako	Great Britain	21.16	
13	2	Pascal Irdor	France	21.19	Q
14	1	Carlo Occhiena	Italy	21.20	Q
15	3	Derry Pemberton	United States Virgin Islands	21.23	
16	2	Franck Waota	Ivory Coast	21.27	
16	2	Manuel Moreno	Spain	21.27	
18	1	Hideaki Miyata	Japan	21.37	Q
19	1	Michael Afilaka	Great Britain	21.53	Q
19	2	Carlos Santos	Puerto Rico	21.53	
21	4	László Kiss	Hungary	21.60	Q
22	2	Roberto Tirino	Italy	21.64	
23	1	Robinson Stewart	Swaziland	21.74	
23	3	Leopoldt Vries	South Africa	21.74	
25	3	Ricardo Oliveira	Brazil	21.75	
26	4	Tsai Yi-cheng	Chinese Taipei	21.82	
27	1	Anthony Ryan	Australia	21.87	
28	4	Masoud Khamis Rahman	Qatar	21.97	
29	1	Sylvanus Hepburn	Bahamas	22.25	
30	4	Konstadinos Kederis	Greece	27.1	
	?	Tsvetoslav Stankulov	Bulgaria	?	
	?	Zepee Mberivana	Namibia	?	

=== Semifinals ===
Wind:
Heat 1: +2.8 m/s, Heat 2: +1.5 m/s

Rank	Heat	Athlete	Nationality	Time	Notes
1	1	Bryan Bridgewater	United States	20.39	Q
2	2	Chris Nelloms	United States	20.50	Q
3	2	Iván García	Cuba	20.66	Q
4	1	Oumar Loum	Senegal	20.76	Q
5	1	Satoru Inoue	Japan	20.90	Q
6	1	Sergejs Inšakovs	Latvia	20.91	Q
6	2	Andrew Tynes	Bahamas	20.91	Q
8	2	O'Brian Gibbons	Canada	21.00	Q
9	2	Carlo Occhiena	Italy	21.01	
10	1	Jordi Mayoral	Spain	21.05	
11	2	Mark Ladbrook	Australia	21.05	
12	2	Hideyaki Miyata	Japan	21.32	
13	1	Pascal Irdor	France	21.35	
14	1	Michael Afilaka	Great Britain	21.39	
15	2	László Kiss	Hungary	21.49	
	1	Glenroy Gilbert	Canada	DNS	

=== Final ===
Wind: +2.4 m/s

Rank	Lane	Athlete	Nationality	Time	Notes
1st place, gold medalist(s)	6	Bryan Bridgewater	United States	20.14	
2nd place, silver medalist(s)	4	Chris Nelloms	United States	20.17	
3rd place, bronze medalist(s)	3	Iván García	Cuba	20.55	
4	5	Oumar Loum	Senegal	20.68	
5	8	Satoru Inoue	Japan	20.84	
6	1	Andrew Tynes	Bahamas	20.86	
7	7	Sergejs Inšakovs	Latvia	20.97	
8	2	O'Brian Gibbons	Canada	21.11	
