= Paul Henderson (sprinter) =

Australian sprinter (born 1971)

Medal record

Men's athletics

Representing Australia

Commonwealth Games
Silver medal – second place	1994 Victoria	4×100 m relay

World Championships
Silver medal – second place	1995 Gothenburg	4×100 m relay

Paul Henderson (born 13 March 1971) is an Australian former track and field sprinter. He won silver medals with the Australian 4×100 metres relay team at the Commonwealth Games in 1994 and 1995 World Championships in Athletics. He shares the Oceanian and Australian record for the event at 38.17 seconds.

== Career ==
Born in Casino, New South Wales, Henderson rose on the national scene as a junior athlete and at the 1989 Australian junior championships he won 200 metres and was runner-up in both 100 metres and long jump. The following year he won a sprint double at the junior championships.

His international debut came at the 1990 World Junior Championships in Athletics, where he was chosen to run in all three short sprint events. He placed seventh over 200 m, but failed to make the final in either the 100 m or the 4×100 metres relay. A runner-up finish over 200 m at the Australian Athletics Championships in 1993 brought him selection for the 1993 World Championships in Athletics. On his senior debut for Australia he helped the national relay team to fifth place with a time of 38.69 seconds. His first international medal came the year after at the 1994 Commonwealth Games, where the Australian 4×100 m relay won the silver medal behind Canada. This was only the second ever Commonwealth medal Australia had won in that event, after their 1974 win.

Henderson formed part of the relay quartet for the 1995 World Championships in Athletics alongside Tim Jackson, Steve Brimacombe and Damien Marsh. Running the lead-off leg, the team set an Oceanian record time of 38.28 seconds in the heats to progress to the next round as the fastest team. They improved this further to 38.17 seconds to win their semi-final. The team was slightly slower in the final race, but were a clear second place behind Canada – the team's silver was Australia's first ever World Championships relay medal. The Australian women's 4×400 metres relay followed this with a second relay medal one hour later.

His final major international appearance was at the 1996 Atlanta Olympics. He did not repeat the success of the World Championships and was eliminated in the first round of the individual 100 m before being disqualified in the men's relay event. He set his personal best for the 100 m of 10.27 seconds that same year.

== Personal bests ==
- 60 metres – 6.77 (1999)
- 100 metres – 10.27 (1996)
- 200 metres – 20.63 (1993)

== International competitions ==
Year	Competition	Venue	Position	Event	Notes
Representing Australia
1990	World Junior Championships	Plovdiv, Bulgaria	28th (q-finals)	100 m	10.83 (wind: -2.1 m/s)
1990	World Junior Championships	Plovdiv, Bulgaria	7th	200 m	21.24 (wind: -0.5 m/s)
1990	World Junior Championships	Plovdiv, Bulgaria	12th (heats)	4 × 100 m relay	40.71
1993	World Championships	Stuttgart, Germany	5th	4 × 100 m relay	38.69
1994	Commonwealth Games	Victoria, Canada	2nd	4 × 100 m relay	38.88
1995	World Championships	Gothenburg, Sweden	4th (q-finals)	100 m	10.34
1995	World Championships	Gothenburg, Sweden	2nd	4 × 100 m relay	38.50
1996	Olympic Games	Atlanta, United States	5th (heats)	100 m	10.52
1996	Olympic Games	Atlanta, United States	—	4 × 100 m relay	DQ
