= Athletics at the 1990 Commonwealth Games – Men's 4 × 100 metres relay =

Men's 4 × 100 metres relay at the Commonwealth Games

The men's 4 × 100 metres relay event at the 1990 Commonwealth Games was held on 2 and 3 February at the Mount Smart Stadium in Auckland.

== Medalists ==
Gold	Silver	Bronze
England; Clarence Callender; John Regis; Marcus Adam; Linford Christie; Tony Jarrett*	Nigeria; Victor Nwankwo; Davidson Ezinwa; Osmond Ezinwa; Abdullahi Tetengi	Jamaica; Wayne Watson; John Mair; Clive Wright; Ray Stewart

* Athletes who competed in heats only and received medals.

== Results ==
=== Heats ===
Qualification: First 4 teams of each heat (Q) plus the next 1 fastest (q) qualified for the final.

Rank	Heat	Nation	Athletes	Time	Notes
1	1	Nigeria	Victor Nwankwo, Davidson Ezinwa, Osmond Ezinwa, Abdullahi Tetengi	39.21	Q
2	2	England	Clarence Callender, Tony Jarrett, John Regis, Linford Christie	39.35	Q
3	1	Jamaica	John Mair, Ray Stewart, Clive Wright, Wayne Watson	39.35	Q
4	2	Australia	Shane Naylor, Paul Greene, Steve McBain, Fred Martin	39.81	Q
5	1	Canada	Everton Anderson, Mike Dwyer, Cyprian Enweani, Peter Ogilvie	39.96	Q
6	2	Scotland	Elliot Bunney, Dave Clark, Jamie Henderson, Mark Davidson	40.21	Q
7	1	New Zealand	Murray Gutry, Gary Henley-Smith, Dale McClunie, Scott Bowden	40.53	Q
8	1	Papua New Guinea	Esekiel Wartovo, John Hou, Emmanuel Mack, Takale Tuna	41.16	q
9	2	Gambia	Abodourahman Jallow, Lamin Marikong, Pa Hali Jammeh, Clifford Adams	41.87	Q
10	1	Bangladesh	Mohamed Shah Alam, Shahanuddin Choudhury, Mohamed Hossain Milzer, Mohamed Shah Jalal	42.47	
	2	Ghana	Gus Nketia, Laud Codjoe, Gabriel Osei, Nelson Boateng	DQ	

=== Final ===
Rank	Lane	Nation	Athletes	Time	Notes
1st place, gold medalist(s)	3	England	Clarence Callender, John Regis, Marcus Adam, Linford Christie	38.67	
2nd place, silver medalist(s)	4	Nigeria	Victor Nwankwo, Davidson Ezinwa, Osmond Ezinwa, Abdullahi Tetengi	38.85	
3rd place, bronze medalist(s)	5	Jamaica	Wayne Watson, John Mair, Clive Wright, Ray Stewart	38.85	
4	6	Australia	Shane Naylor, Paul Greene, Steve McBain, Fred Martin	39.25	
5	9	Canada	Everton Anderson, Mike Dwyer, Cyprian Enweani, Peter Ogilvie	39.43	
6	7	Scotland	Elliot Bunney, Dave Clark, Jamie Henderson, Mark Davidson	39.61	
7	1	Papua New Guinea	Esekiel Wartovo, John Hou, Emmanuel Mack, Takale Tuna	40.94	
8	8	Gambia	Abodourahman Jallow, Lamin Marikong, Pa Hali Jammeh, Clifford Adams	41.65	
9	2	New Zealand	Murray Gutry, Gary Henley-Smith, Grant Gilbert, Dale McClunie	44.34	
