= 1995 World Championships in Athletics – Men's 4 × 100 metres relay =

These are the results of the men's 4 × 100 metres relay event at the 1995 World Championships in Athletics in Gothenburg, Sweden.

== Medalists ==
Gold	Silver	Bronze
Canada; Robert Esmie; Glenroy Gilbert; Bruny Surin; Donovan Bailey	Australia; Paul Henderson; Tim Jackson; Steve Brimacombe; Damien Marsh	Italy; Giovanni Puggioni; Ezio Madonia; Angelo Cipolloni; Sandro Floris

== Results ==
=== Heats ===
Qualification: First 3 of each heat (Q) and the next 4 fastest (q) qualified for the semifinals.

Rank	Heat	Nation	Athletes	Time	Notes
1	3	Australia	Paul Henderson, Tim Jackson, Steve Brimacombe, Damien Marsh	38.28	Q, AR
2	1	Canada	Robert Esmie, Glenroy Gilbert, Bruny Surin, Donovan Bailey	38.38	Q
3	2	Sweden	Peter Karlsson, Matias Ghansah, Lars Hedner, Tobias Karlsson	38.74	Q, NR
4	1	Japan	Hisatsugu Suzuki, Koji Ito, Satoru Inoue, Yoshitaka Ito	38.79	Q
5	3	China	Li Xiaoping, Lin Wei, Huang Danwei, Chen Wenzhong	38.81	Q, NR
6	2	France	Olivier Theophile, Sebastien Carrat, Jean-Charles Trouabal, Pascal Theophile	38.82	Q
7	1	Brazil	André da Silva, Sidnei Telles, Édson Ribeiro, Robson da Silva	38.85	Q, AR
8	3	Jamaica	Leon Gordon, Michael Green, Warren Johnson, Raymond Stewart	38.92	Q
9	4	Italy	Giovanni Puggioni, Ezio Madonia, Angelo Cipolloni, Sandro Floris	39.00	Q
10	1	Russia	Pavel Galkin, Aleksandr Sokolov, Andrey Grigoryev, Andrey Fedoriv	39.03	q
11	1	Germany	Marc Blume, Robert Kurnicki, Christian Konieczny, Michael Huke	39.06	q
12	4	Great Britain	Jason Gardener, Darren Braithwaite, John Regis, Solomon Wariso	39.07	Q
13	3	Ivory Coast	Ahmed Douhou, Jean-Olivier Zirignon, Eric Pacome, Ibrahim Meité	39.29	q
14	4	Ukraine	Aleksey Chikhachov, Dmitriy Vanyaikin, Oleh Kramarenko, Serhiy Osovych	39.31	Q
15	2	Spain	Frutos Feo, Francisco Javier Navarro, Jordi Mayoral, Pedro Pablo Nolet	39.35	Q
16	2	Bahamas	Renward Wells, Brian Babbs, Andrew Tynes, Alfred Stubbs	39.37	q
17	1	Togo	Teko Folligan, Menelik Lawson, Franck Amegnigan, Kossi Akoto	39.45	NR
18	4	Mexico	Carlos Villaseñor, Alejandro Cárdenas, Genaro Rojas, Jaime Barragán	39.66	
19	3	Barbados	Garfield Gill, Jason St. Hill, Achebe Hope, Obadele Thompson	39.68	
20	4	New Zealand	Laud Codjoe, Mark Keddell, Chris Donaldson, Augustine Nketia	39.70	
21	2	Ghana	Duah Abu, Aziz Zakari, Eric Nkansah, Emmanuel Tuffour	39.83	
22	3	Trinidad and Tobago	Alvin Daniel, Patrick Delice, Neil de Silva, Hayden Stephen	40.09	
23	4	Saint Kitts and Nevis	Ricardo Liddie, Eric Haynes, Kim Collins, Kurvin Wallace	40.12	NR
24	1	Cameroon	Issa-Aime Nthepe, Benjamin Sirimou, Samuel Nchinda, Pierre Makon	40.72	NR
—N/a	2	Cuba	Leonardo Prevost, Joel Lamela, Joel Isasi, Jorge Aguilera	DQ	
—N/a	2	Saudi Arabia	Mohamed Al-Bishi, Mohammed Al Masoud, Mohammad Saif, Jamal Al-Safar	DQ	
—N/a	4	Greece	Alexandros Genovelis, Alexandros Alexopoulos, Georgios Panagiotopoulos, Alexandros Terzian	DQ	
—N/a	3	United States	Maurice Greene, Jon Drummond, Tony McCall, Michael Marsh	DNF	

=== Semifinals ===
Qualification: First 4 of each heat qualified directly (Q) for the final.

Rank	Heat	Nation	Athletes	Time	Notes
1	1	Canada	Robert Esmie, Glenroy Gilbert, Bruny Surin, Donovan Bailey	38.16	Q
2	2	Australia	Paul Henderson, Tim Jackson, Steve Brimacombe, Damien Marsh	38.17	Q, AR
3	2	Italy	Giovanni Puggioni, Ezio Madonia, Angelo Cipolloni, Sandro Floris	38.41	Q
4	2	Brazil	André da Silva, Sidnei Telles, Édson Ribeiro, Robson da Silva	38.48	Q, AR
5	1	Jamaica	Robert Foster, Michael Green, Leon Gordon, Raymond Stewart	38.64	Q
6	2	Japan	Hisatsugu Suzuki, Koji Ito, Satoru Inoue, Yoshitaka Ito	38.67	Q, AR
7	2	Great Britain	Jason Gardener, Darren Braithwaite, John Regis, Solomon Wariso	38.75	
8	1	Ukraine	Aleksey Chikhachov, Dmytro Vanyaikin, Oleh Kramarenko, Serhiy Osovych	38.76	Q, NR
9	1	Sweden	Peter Karlsson, Matias Ghansah, Lars Hedner, Tobias Karlsson	38.78	Q
9	2	Russia	Aleksandr Porkhomovskiy, Aleksandr Sokolov, Andrey Grigoryev, Andrey Fedoriv	38.78	
11	2	Germany	Holger Blume, Robert Kurnicki, Christian Konieczny, Michael Huke	38.90	
12	1	China	Li Xiaoping, Lin Wei, Huang Danwei, Chen Wenzhong	38.93	
13	2	Spain	Frutos Feo, Francisco Javier Navarro, Jordi Mayoral, Pedro Pablo Nolet	39.16	
14	1	Ivory Coast	Ahmed Douhou, Jean-Olivier Zirignon, Eric Pacome, Ibrahim Meité	39.50	
15	1	Bahamas	Renward Wells, Andrew Tynes, Iram Lewis, Alfred Stubbs	39.65	
—N/a	1	France	Olivier Theophile, Sebastien Carrat, Jean-Charles Trouabal, Pascal Theophile	DNF	

=== Final ===
Rank	Lane	Nation	Athletes	Time	Notes
1st place, gold medalist(s)	4	Canada	Robert Esmie, Glenroy Gilbert, Bruny Surin, Donovan Bailey	38.31	
2nd place, silver medalist(s)	5	Australia	Paul Henderson, Tim Jackson, Steve Brimacombe, Damien Marsh	38.50	
3rd place, bronze medalist(s)	3	Italy	Giovanni Puggioni, Ezio Madonia, Angelo Cipolloni, Sandro Floris	39.07	
4	6	Jamaica	James Beckford, Michael Green, Leon Gordon, Raymond Stewart	39.10	
5	8	Japan	Hisatsugu Suzuki, Koji Ito, Satoru Inoue, Yoshitaka Ito	39.33	
6	1	Brazil	André da Silva, Sidnei Telles, Édson Ribeiro, Robson da Silva	39.35	
7	7	Ukraine	Oleksey Chikhachov, Dmytro Vanyaikin, Oleh Kramarenko, Serhiy Osovych	39.39	
—N/a	2	Sweden	Peter Karlsson, Matias Ghansah, Lars Hedner, Tobias Karlsson	DQ	
