= Ratzenberger =

Ratzenberger is a surname. Notable people with the surname include:

- Franz Ratzenberger (born 1965), Austrian sprinter
- John Ratzenberger (born 1947), American actor, director, producer, writer, and entrepreneur
- Roland Ratzenberger (1960–1994), Austrian racing driver
