= 1989 Pan American Junior Athletics Championships =

V Pan American Junior Athletics Championships
- Dates: June 23–25
- Host city: Santa Fe, Argentina
- Level: Junior
- Events: 40
- Participation: about 280 athletes from 16 nations

The 5th Pan American Junior Athletics Championships were held in Santa Fe, Argentina, on June 23–25, 1989.

== Participation (unofficial) ==
Detailed result lists can be found on the "World Junior Athletics History" website. An unofficial count yields the number of about 280 athletes from about 16 countries: Argentina (46), Bahamas (8), Bolivia (4), Brazil (31), Canada (26), Chile (21), Colombia (4), Cuba (28), Ecuador (8), Mexico (23), Paraguay (8), Peru (6), Puerto Rico (2), United States (34), Uruguay (10), Venezuela (21).

== Medal summary ==
Medal winners are published. Complete results can be found on the "World Junior Athletics History" website.

=== Men ===
Event	Gold		Silver		Bronze	
100 metres	Brian Bridgewater (USA)	10.72	Joel Lamela (CUB)	10.88	Fernando Botassa (BRA)	10.89
200 metres	Brian Bridgewater (USA)	21.27	Peter Ogilvie (CAN)	21.37	Joel Lamela (CUB)	21.50
400 metres	Chris Nelloms (USA)	46.19	Inaldo Sena (BRA)	47.14	Enrique Villar (CUB)	47.40
800 metres	Rich Kenah (USA)	1:51.78	Graham Hood (CAN)	1:51.98	Edgardo Graglia (ARG)	1:52.00
1500 metres	Bob Kennedy (USA)	3:58.56	Raúl García (MEX)	4:00.24	Mario González (ARG)	4:00.36
5000 metres	Paul Shea (USA)	14:22.02	Raúl García (MEX)	14:24.17	Alejandro Villanueva (MEX)	14:24.82
10,000 metres	Alejandro Villanueva (MEX)	29:28.6	Robinson Semolini (BRA)	30:14.8	Marcelo Barrientos (CHI)	30:31.4
3000 metres steeplechase	José Moraes (BRA)	8:57.63	Rorrie Currie (CAN)	9:00.48	Nelson de la Cruz (CUB)	9:04.25
110 metres hurdles	Glenn Terry (USA)	14.28	Alexis Sánchez (CUB)	14.39	Eliexer Pulgar (VEN)	14.69
400 metres hurdles	Derrick Adkins (USA)	50.92	Eronilde de Araújo (BRA)	51.20	Antonio Rendón (CUB)	52.17
4 × 100 metres relay	United States; Glenn Terry; Dion Bentley; Bryan Bridgewater; Chris Nelloms	40.14	Bahamas; Timothy Clinton; Charles Gardner; Joseph Styles; Renward Wells	40.72	Venezuela; Edgar Chourio; Juan Díaz; Reinaldo Santana; Eliecer Pulgar	42.15
4 × 400 metres relay	United States; Glenn Terry; Derrick Adkins; Bryan Bridgewater; Chris Nelloms	3:11.76	Brazil; Inaldo Sena; Paulo Rodrigues; Luís Eloi; Eronilde de Araújo	3:13.22	Cuba; Joel Lamela; Alexis Sánchez; Enrique Díaz; Antonio Miguel Rendon	3:14.06
10,000 metres track walk	Alberto Cruz (MEX)	42:00.21	Aarón González (MEX)	42:24.62	Roberto González (CUB)	42:27.72
High jump	Alex Zaliauskas (CAN)	2.20	Kevin Clements (USA)	2.17	Godfrey Foster (CAN)	2.08
Pole vault	Rodrigo Casacurta (BRA)	4.60	Cristián Aspillaga (CHI)	4.60	Igor Castillo (PER)	4.20
Long jump	Dion Bentley (USA)	8.16	Esteban Richard (CUB)	7.73w	Félix Molina (PUR)	7.25
Triple jump	Esteban Richard (CUB)	15.93	Brian Tabor (USA)	15.89	Jairo Venâncio (BRA)	15.64
Shot put	David Winkler (USA)	16.61	Pedro Acosta (CUB)	15.79	Yojer Medina (VEN)	15.12
Discus throw	Pedro Acosta (CUB)	60.00	Greg Hart (USA)	53.34	Lázaro Vega (CUB)	49.54
Hammer throw	Ismael López (CUB)	59.80	Alexandre Mantovani (BRA)	55.86	Domingo Sandoval (CUB)	55.24
Javelin throw	Fernando Iglesias (CUB)	65.12	Mark Morris (USA)	64.40	Kevin Smith (BAH)	61.96
Decathlon	Aric Long (USA)	6648	Marco Antônio Brito (BRA)	6024	Renny Pérez (VEN)	5888

=== Women ===
Event	Gold		Silver		Bronze	
100 metres	Liliana Allen (CUB)	11.66	Chryste Gaines (USA)	12.11	Karen Clarke (CAN)	12.30
200 metres	Liliana Allen (CUB)	23.29	Jupira da Graça (BRA)	24.04	Karen Clarke (CAN)	24.24
400 metres	Cheryl Allen (CAN)	53.28	Nancy Ferrer (CUB)	53.86	Rebecca Russell (USA)	54.20
800 metres	Mabel Arrúa (ARG)	2:07.45	Carol Holman (CAN)	2:08.34	Célia dos Santos (BRA)	2:09.02
1500 metres	Mabel Arrúa (ARG)	4:28.36	Ana Gunasekara (CAN)	4:29.74	Lori Durward (CAN)	4:31.33
3000 metres	Lisa Harvey (CAN)	9:16.05	Maricarmen Díaz (MEX)	9:24.85	Janeth Caizalitín (ECU)	9:27.43
10,000 metres	Maricarmen Díaz (MEX)	34:22.83	Sandra Ruales (ECU)	34:50.90	Janeth Caizalitín (ECU)	35:48.37
100 metres hurdles	Cinnamon Sheffield (USA)	13.39	Yanelis Valiente (CUB)	13.87	Maria Luna (BRA)	14.20
400 metres hurdles	Lency Montelier (CUB)	58.12	Caroline Fortin (CAN)	58.71	Tyra Carson (USA)	58.76
4 × 100 metres relay	United States; Shirley Evans; Tasha Downing; Cinnamon Sheffield; Chryste Gaines	45.20	Cuba; Liliana Allen; Tayami Martínez; Julia Duporty; Yanelis Valiente	45.52	Brazil; Adriana Raulino; Jupira da Graça; María Luna; Claudete Pina	46.72
4 × 400 metres relay	Cuba; Nancy McLeón; Marbelis Figueredo; Mayelin Lemus; Lency Montelier	3:39.94	United States; Tyra Carson; Donna Crumety; Tasha Downing; Rebecca Russell	3:40.46	Brazil; America Inacio; Luciana Mendes; Jupira da Graça; Claudete Pina	3:40.87
5000 metres track walk	Tina Poitras (CAN)	24:22.10	Miriam Ramón (ECU)	24:23.27	Ruth Talbot (CAN)	24:34.54
High jump	Ioamnet Quintero (CUB)	1.89	Corales Brown (CAN)	1.79	Kerry Chambers (CAN)	1.79
Long jump	Donna Crumety (USA)	5.99	Andrea Ávila (ARG)	5.88	Natalia Toledo (PAR)	5.84
Shot put	Alexandra Amaro (BRA)	14.00	Angela Dolby (USA)	13.84	Elisângela Adriano (BRA)	13.16
Discus throw	Marisela Brestet (CUB)	50.08	Marlén Sánchez (CUB)	49.38	Teresa Sherman (USA)	48.80
Javelin throw	Isel López (CUB)	61.06	Ashley Selman (USA)	55.32	Verónica Prieto (COL)	44.44
Heptathlon	Miladys Portuondo (CUB)	5163	Kelly Blair (USA)	4978	Vera Alves (BRA)	4706

== Medal table (unofficial) ==
* Host nation (Argentina)

Rank	Nation	Gold	Silver	Bronze	Total
1	United States	16	9	3	28
2	Cuba	12	8	8	28
3	Canada	4	7	6	17
4	Brazil	3	7	8	18
5	Mexico	3	4	1	8
6	Argentina*	2	1	2	5
7	Ecuador	0	2	2	4
8	Bahamas	0	1	1	2
8	Chile	0	1	1	2
10	Venezuela	0	0	4	4
11	Colombia	0	0	1	1
11	Paraguay	0	0	1	1
11	Peru	0	0	1	1
11	Puerto Rico	0	0	1	1
Totals (14 entries)		40	40	40	120
