= Peter Ogilvie =

Canadian sprinter (1972–2024)

Personal information
- Full name: Peter Steven Ogilvie
- Nationality: Canadian
- Born: May 2, 1972 Burnaby, British Columbia, Canada
- Died: October 5, 2024 (aged 52) Sherwood Park, Alberta, Canada
- Height: 1.78 m (5 ft 10 in)

Sport
- Sport: Track and Field
- Events: 100m 200m 4 x 100m
- Club: Vancouver Olympic Club; Coquitlam Cheetahs; Richmond Kajaks; Norwesters Track & Field Club; Metro Athletic Club

Peter Steven Ogilvie (May 2, 1972 – October 5, 2024) was a Canadian sprinter who competed primarily in the 200 metres. Growing up in Burnaby, British Columbia, Peter represented Canada at the 1992 and 1996 Summer Olympics, as well as two outdoor (1991, 1995) IAAF World Championships, one indoor IAAF World Championships (1993), two Commonwealth Games (1990, 1994), and one Pan American Games (1991). He won a silver medal in the 4 × 100 m relay at the 1991 Pan American Games and a gold medal in the 4 × 100 m relay at the 1994 Jeux de la Francophonie.

His time of 20.62 was the Canadian U20 men's national record in the 200m from 1991 until it was broken in 2022 by Almond Small.

== Post-athletics career ==
Ogilvie served as executive director of Athletics Alberta from 2005 to 2014. He was CEO of the organizing committee that managed the 2015 Pan American Junior Athletics Championships, which marked the first time that the championships were held in western North America. In fact, Ogilvie is the first Pan Am Games medallist/alumni in athletics to have successfully led the event management and operations of the Pan American U20 Athletics Championships.

Ogilvie was instrumental in organizing the first-ever amalgamated Canadian Track and Field Championships in 2015, which combined the U20, senior, and para categories into one major event. In 2016, he again produced Athletics Canada's Canadian Track and Field Championships and Selection Trials for the 2016 Summer Olympic and Paralympic Games. The event was honoured as the 2016 Canadian Sport Tourism Alliance (CSTA) Canadian Sport Event of the Year Award (Group B: budget less than $1 million).

Ogilvie has been credited by Athletics Canada as the visionary behind TrackTown Canada, and for making Edmonton the destination city for athletic events in Canada. Ogilvie created and produced the TrackTown Classic (hosted by TrackTown Canada), which was a redevelopment of the former Edmonton International Track Classic (2010 - 2014). This international athletics competition is held annually at the University of Alberta's Foote Field, and is part of Athletics Canada's National Track and Field Tour and the World Athletics Continental Tour.

Ogilvie died of cancer in Sherwood Park, on October 5, 2024, at the age of 52. Athletics Canada announced his death and commented that he was, "a passionate advocate and entrepreneur in athletics, involved in nearly every aspect of the sport."

== Competition record ==
Year	Competition	Venue	Position	Event	Notes
Representing Canada
1988	World Junior Championships	Sudbury, Ontario	9th (sh)	4 × 100 m relay	39.51
1989	Pan American Junior Championships	Santa Fe, Argentina	4th	100 m	10.90
1989	Pan American Junior Championships	Santa Fe, Argentina	2nd	200 m	21.37
1990	Commonwealth Games	Auckland, New Zealand	23rd (qf)	100 m	10.69
1990	Commonwealth Games	Auckland, New Zealand	5th	4 × 100 m relay	39.43
1990	World Junior Championships	Plovdiv, Bulgaria	11th (sf)	100 m	10.54
1990	World Junior Championships	Plovdiv, Bulgaria	5th	200 m	21.08
1990	World Junior Championships	Plovdiv, Bulgaria	15th (h)	4 × 100 m relay	41.88
1991	Pan American Junior Championships	Kingston, Jamaica	2nd	100 m	10.43 (w)
1991	Pan American Junior Championships	Kingston, Jamaica	2nd	200 m	20.75
1991	Pan American Junior Championships	Kingston, Jamaica	–	4 × 100 m relay	DQ
1991	Pan American Games	Havana, Cuba	4th	200 m	21.20
1991	Pan American Games	Havana, Cuba	2nd	4 × 100 m relay	39.95
1991	World Championships	Tokyo, Japan	34th (h)	200 m	21.09
1991	World Championships	Tokyo, Japan	8th (h)	4 × 100 m relay	39.51
1992	Olympic Games	Barcelona, Spain	18th (qf)	200 m	20.77
1992	Olympic Games	Barcelona, Spain	5th (h)	4 × 100 m relay	39.34
1993	World Indoor Championships	Toronto, Ontario, Canada	8th (sf)	200 m	21.15
1993	Universiade	Buffalo, United States	7th	100 m	10.36 (w)
1993	Universiade	Buffalo, United States	4th	4 × 100 m relay	39.41
1993	Universiade	Buffalo, United States	5th	4 × 400 m relay	3:06.83
1994	Jeux de la Francophonie	Paris, France	4th	200 m	21.29
1994	Jeux de la Francophonie	Paris, France	1st	4 × 100 m relay	39.16
1994	Commonwealth Games	Victoria, British Columbia, Canada	22nd (qf)	200 m	21.05
1995	World Championships	Gothenburg, Sweden	51st (h)	200 m	21.18
1996	Olympic Games	Atlanta, United States	75th (h)	200 m	22.00

== Personal bests ==
Outdoor

- 100 metres – 10.29 (+1.3 m/s) (Montreal 1995)
- 200 metres – 20.46 (+1.7 m/s) (Ingolstadt 1992)
- 400 metres – 46.93 (Provo 1992)

Indoor

- 60 metres – 6.70 (Saskatoon 1991)
- 200 metres – 21.15 (Toronto 1993)

== Records ==
- British Columbia High School Track & Field Championships - Senior Boys 100m - 10.46 (+0.6) (1990)

== Accomplishments ==
- Sport BC High School Athlete of the Year (1989)
- Sport BC High School Athlete of the Year (1990)
- Burnaby Sports Hall of Fame Inductee (2004) - Athlete
- City of Edmonton Salute to Excellence Sport Hall of Fame Inductee (2016) - Builder
- 2016 CSTA Canadian Sport Event of the Year Award (Group B: budget less than $1 million) - Canadian Track and Field Championships and Selection Trials for the 2016 Summer Olympic and Paralympic Games (Edmonton, AB)
- 2016 Edmonton Event Awards (Best Live Outdoor Event) - Canadian Track and Field Championships and Selection Trials for the 2016 Summer Olympic and Paralympic Games

== See also ==
- List of Canadian sports personalities
