= Hisatsugu =

Hisatsugu (Japanese: 久嗣 or 尚嗣) is a masculine Japanese given name. Notable people with the name include:

- Hisatsugu Suzuki (born 1970), Japanese sprinter
- Konoe Hisatsugu (1622–1653), son of regent Nobuhiro and court noble of the Edo period
