= Chris Nelloms =

American sprinter (born 1971)

Personal information
- Born: August 14, 1971 (age 55) Dayton, Ohio, United States

Sport
- Sport: Track and field
Medal record
Representing United States
Summer Universiade
Silver medal – second place	1993 Buffalo	200 m

Chris Nelloms (born August 14, 1971) is an American male former track and field sprinter who specialized in the 200- and 400-meter dash. In 1992, Nelloms was shot by an unknown assailant during athletic practice in a park. He made a full recovery and returned to competitive running. In 1999, Nelloms was charged and convicted on eight counts of sexual offenses against his underage daughter. He was sentenced to four life terms in prison.

== Early life ==
Nelloms attended Dunbar High School in Dayton and set several high school records. He originally competed in both sprints and hurdling and a national high school record of 13.30 seconds for the 110-meter hurdles in 1990 led him to be chosen as Track & Field News' High School Athlete of the Year. He had a daughter born in 1986.

== Career ==
With a relay gold at the 1988 World Junior Championships in Athletics and three sprint golds at the 1990 World Junior Championships in Athletics, Nelloms has won the most titles in the history of the IAAF World Junior Championships. He also won a gold medal triple at the 1989 Pan American Junior Athletics Championships, topping the podium in the 400 m, 4 × 100-meter relay and 4 × 400-meter relay.

In August 1992 he was shot in the back in a park in Dayton, Ohio, where he had been completing a fitness run. The shot hit an artery, broke his collarbone and punctured a lung, yet he managed to return to good health and race again. No one was charged with the shooting.

He won back-to-back 200 m titles at the NCAA Men's Division I Indoor Track and Field Championships in 1992 to 1993. At the 1993 NCAA Division I Outdoor Track and Field Championships he won the 200 m and 4 × 400 m relay titles, as well as taking a bronze in the 4 × 100 m relay. As a result, he was named the Ohio State Buckeyes male athlete of the year – only the third track athlete to win that title after Olympic medalists Butch Reynolds and Joe Greene. He took a 200 m silver medal at the 1993 Summer Universiade the following month, finishing behind his teammate Brian Bridgewater.

Nelloms took his first national title at the USA Indoor Track and Field Championships in 1994, winning the 200 m race. He ranked second in the world on time for that indoor season behind Olympic champion Linford Christie.

== Rape conviction and imprisonment ==
On January 8, 1999, Nelloms was convicted of one count of felonious sexual penetration and seven counts of rape against his daughter, who had accused him of sexually abusing her in Ohio and Kentucky from 1995 to 1997, when she was between the ages of eight and 11. He was sentenced to four consecutive terms of life in prison. He is incarcerated at Warren Correctional Institution.

Immediately following his trial, Nelloms appealed the conviction, arguing juror and prosecutorial misconduct; the appeal was denied. In February 1999, he appealed again to the Ohio Court of Appeals, arguing for a new trial on the grounds that the state of Ohio only had jurisdiction to judge incidents that occurred in Ohio, not others that occurred in Kentucky. The court ruled that four counts of the indictment be dismissed, but denied Nelloms a new trial. Nelloms appealed again to the State Supreme Court, which rejected it. The case was remanded to the trial court, which rejected the appeal in June 2001.

A prison interview with Nelloms was published in the Dayton Daily News in 2006, in which he proclaimed his innocence. In response the victim, Terria Pitts, decided to waive her anonymity and challenge her father, saying: "I wanted to let the public know that Chris Nelloms is not innocent...he's being incarcerated for something he did do. There was evidence. I just want people to know that I'm not a liar."

== Personal records ==
- 100-meter dash – 10.33 (1992)
- 200-meter dash – 20.23 (1993)
- 300-meter dash – 32.38 (1993)
- 400-meter dash – 45.36 (1990)

== International competitions ==
Year	Competition	Venue	Position	Event	Notes
1988	World Junior Championships	Sudbury, Canada	1st	4 × 400 m relay	3:05.09
1989	Pan American Junior Championships	Santa Fe, Argentina	1st	400 m	46.19
1989	Pan American Junior Championships	Santa Fe, Argentina	1st	4 × 100 m relay	40.14
1989	Pan American Junior Championships	Santa Fe, Argentina	1st	4 × 400 m relay	3:11.76
1990	World Junior Championships	Plovdiv, Bulgaria	1st	400 m	45.43
1990	World Junior Championships	Plovdiv, Bulgaria	1st	4 × 100 m relay	39.13
1990	World Junior Championships	Plovdiv, Bulgaria	1st	4 × 400 m relay	3:02.26
1993	Universiade	Buffalo, United States	2nd	200 m	20.17

== National titles ==
- USA Indoor Track and Field Championships
  - 200 m: 1994
- NCAA Men's Division I Outdoor Track and Field Championships
  - 200 m: 1993
  - 4 × 400 m relay: 1993
- NCAA Men's Division I Indoor Track and Field Championships
  - 200 m: 1992, 1993

Awards
Preceded by Dion Bentley	Track & Field News High School Boys Athlete of the Year; 1990	Succeeded by Bryan Bronson
Preceded by Jim Jackson	Ohio State Athlete of the Year; 1993	Succeeded by Chris Sanders
