= Andreas Berger (athlete) =

Austrian sprinter (born 1961)

Andreas Berger (born 9 June 1961 in Gmunden, Oberösterreich) is a former Austrian track and field sprinter, who ran in the 100 m and 200 m. In 1993 he tested positive for the banned steroid Metandienone, together with his teammates Franz Ratzenberger, Thomas Renner, and Gernot Kellermayr, and was banned from competition for two years.

== Biography ==
His biggest success came in 1989 when he won the European Indoor Championship's 60 meter dash. In 1987 and 1989 he reached the World Championship semi-finals (1987 outdoors at 100 & 200 m) (1989 indoors at 60 m). He participated in the 1988 Summer Olympics reaching the quarter-finals of the 100 and 200 metres. Berger caused two false starts during a 100-meter first round qualifying heat at the 1992 Summer Olympics and was disqualified. He went on to reach the quarter-finals of the 200 m and the final of the 4 × 100 m relay. He still holds the Austrian 100 m dash record (10.15s, 1988).

He was Austrian 100/200 metre champion thirteen times. Berger also won the Austrian 60/200 metre indoor championships on six occasions. He competed at the European championships in Stuttgart 1986 in the 100 metres, but did not advance pass the semi-final.

In 1993 he tested positive for a banned steroid Metandienone, together with his teammates Franz Ratzenberger, Thomas Renner, and Gernot Kellermayr, and was subsequently banned from competition for two years.
