= Jim Bradley (athletics coach) =

Scottish athletics coach (1921–2015)

Jim Bradley (17 May 1921 – 2 July 2015) was a professional athletics coach, renowned for his innovative use of speedball for an athlete's general preparation. Bradley is the only coach to have trained multiple winners of the four best known & most prestigious professional footraces in the world: the New Year Sprint (Scotland) 5 winners, the Stawell Gift (Australia) 2, the Bay Sheffield (Aust) 3 & the Burnie Gift (Aust) 2.

== Early life ==
Jim Stott (he changed his surname to Bradley when he registered as a professional athlete), was born in Edinburgh, Scotland on 17 May 1921. The second youngest of five children, Bradley's father deserted the family, leaving Jim's mother Maggie to raise five children in a single room tenement in Broughton Street. To ease the burden, Bradley's two elder siblings were farmed out to relatives and friends. His mother worked part-time as house-keeper to provide enough money for the family to survive.

Bradley left school at fourteen to work with the London and North Eastern Railway (LNER), where he worked as a junior checker, keeping a record of the number of wagons and their weight in coal. He supplemented his income by carting bottles of tea from local cafes to the workers in the rail yards.

At 17 Bradley lost his railways job to a senior checker and without the prospect of another job lined up, he joined the army in February 1939. He was placed in the Royal Army Services Corp and soon found himself serving in the Middle East where he served four years, sustaining a few war injuries but fortunately nothing life-threatening. He later served in France and Belgium and finally in East Berlin where he remained until the end of the war in 1945.

== Becoming an athlete ==
After returning to the UK in 1946, at the age of 24 Bradley took up athletics, immediately giving up cigarettes and undertaking a vigorous training regime. He joined the Southern Harriers in Edinburgh, training on the track at Meadowbank Stadium. After training alone for some months, a dairy farmer who lived opposite the training track suggested he should seek out a coach and soon Bradley was running under the guidance of athletics coach George McCrae.

In 1947 McCrae persuaded Bradley to run professionally, where he had his first run in the Powderhall sprint, winning his heat and attracting the attention of bookmaker William Murphy who offered to sponsor Bradley for a preparation at the famous New year sprint. In 1951, Bradley became a training partner for Eric Cumming, the champion Australian professional athlete who was on a 10-week preparation for the Powderhall sprint. Cumming was beaten in the semi-final and was ready to return to Australia before Bradley convinced him to stay in Scotland and have another go at Powderhall in 1952. Cumming was indebted to Bradley's advice as he became the first and still the only Australian athlete to win the famous race in 1952 off the tight handicap of two yards on a track covered in snow.

== Becoming a coach ==
By 1951 Bradley was training under new coach Jim Muir, another successful Scottish coach and after training under McCrae and Muir, Bradley began thinking of his arm action and ways he could improve it to enhance his running. Bradley's curiosity with the upper body's role in sprinting led him to research various upper body training methods and he commenced experimenting with the speedball.

After a few years using himself as a guinea pig for his training methodology and enjoying some success, in 1957 he began coaching his first athlete – Ricky Dunbar. As Dunbar was only running 100 yards in 11.4 secs, Jim figured that using Dunbar as model for his speedball ideology would not harm Dunbar's athletic ability and if anything, should help him. Bradly applied different speedball applications before deciding that six three-minute rounds with a one-minute rest produced the best results. He complimented the speedball with body weight exercises and trained every day, keeping detailed records of the training effects.

By 1958 Bradley had added another 6 athletes to his squad and adopted the name – Albany Athletic Club. After running several fund raising efforts including dance nights, the Albany Athletic Club had its own clubrooms and gym equipment. Training at Saughton Enclosure's cinder track, Jim needed to regularly sprinkle salt on the track to prevent it from freezing over. Whilst Jim enjoyed moderate success in his early years, by the early 1960s his squad became a regular force on the Border Games circuit in Scotland & Northern England.

His 'school' of athletes were noted for wearing red silk vests and shorts.

In 1962, Ricky Dunbar ran 2nd in the 120 yards Powderhall Sprint off a mark of 6 yards, before returning in 1963 to win the race off a handicap of 4½ yards. Dunbar went on to become the British professional sprint champion as did his stablemate Dave Walker.

In 1969, Bradley added George McNeil to his stable and had instant success with McNeil winning the 1970 Powderhall Sprint before running 2nd off scratch in 1971. Under Bradley, McNeil broke the world professional 120-yard record on the way to winning the British professional sprint title.

Between 1962 and 1971, Bradley coached eleven Powderhall Sprint finalists including five winners -

- 1963 Rick Dunbar
- 1965 Tom Dickson
- 1969 David Deas
- 1970 George McNeil
- 1971 Wilson Young

Wilson Young later became a successful coach, employing the training methods he learned from Bradley. Young briefly coached Allan Wells who used the Jim Bradley speedball method on his way to winning a 100m gold medal at the 1980 Moscow Olympics.

== 1972 – move to Australia ==
In 1972, Bradley left his management job in Thomson & Brown Brothers Tyre Depot in Edinburgh and emigrated to Australia where he became a fitness coach for the Essendon Football Club, an Australian Rules football team playing in the Victorian Football League. In 1974, Bradley had his jaw broken in the infamous battle of Windy Hill, Essendon brawl that erupted at half time of the Essendon v Richmond game. At the end of the 1974 season, at the coaxing of North Melbourne Football Club captain Barry Davis, Bradley became fitness coach for the Kangaroos and played an integral part in the club's first premiership in 1975. He soon left North Melbourne and undertook some freelance coaching, whilst building his sporting goods business.

In May 1988, at the age of 67, Bradley got the athlete coaching bug back and commenced coaching his own squad on the Victorian Athletic League circuit. In his first season on the professional running circuit, he enjoyed his first Australian success with Paul Young winning the Brunswick Gift over 120 metres in December 1988. His squad quickly grew and within 3 years he was virtually unstoppable with his charges winning several major Gifts with multiple finalists in many of the events.

On New Year's Day 1990, athletes that Bradley coached came first and second in the feature Gifts at two of Australia's prestigious 120-metre Gifts when Dave Clarke beat Paul Dinan at Maryborough (Victoria) and Sam Kirsopp beat Simon Smith at Burnie (Tasmania). In another first, in January 1990 at the Rye Gift carnival, Bradley trained athletes – Simon Smith, Steve Tilburn, David Clarke and Sam Kirsopp filled the first four places in the 120m Gift final. In the 1989/90 season, Bradley's athletes won the Broadford, Wangaratta, Melton, Bendigo and Werribee Gifts, as well as several other sprint races on the VAL circuit. Consequently Bradley was named VAL and ACC (national) coach of the year.

In 1991, Bradley became only the second coach in Stawell Gift history to train the quinella (1st and 2nd) when Steve Brimacombe defeated his stablemate Paul Young in the 120m classic. It also gave him another record that is never likely to be broken – and that is coaching 1st and 2nd in both a Stawell Gift and the New Year Sprint. Brimacombe became Bradley's first Bay Sheffield (SA) winner in 1991, a race Bradley won again in 1993 with Ryan Witnish and 2000 with Craig Brown. Brimacombe also became Bradley's first Australian national champion, when in March 1994, he won a memorable and titanic 200m battle against 1993 world championship finalists, Dean Capobianco and Damien Marsh. Brimacombe later was a finalist in the 1994 Commonwealth Games, becoming Bradley's best ever Australian athlete.

In 1995, Bradley became embroiled in one of the most controversial incidents in Stawell Gift history, when his athlete Glen Crawford was sensationally disqualified after running the fastest heat on Easter Saturday. After two inquiries, Crawford was reinstated and on Easter Monday went on to become the most emphatic winner in Stawell history, winning in an incredible 11.78 secs on a rain affected track. Crawford was later heavily fined by the VAL for a failure to disclose performances, before it was rescinded after Bradley threatened legal action to clear Crawford's name. In December 1995, a Deed of settlement between Crawford and the VAL was signed, effectively clearing Crawford of any wrongdoing.

After a few quiet years in the late 1990s, in 2000/2001, Bradley had a mini resurgence when Craig Brown won the Bay Sheffield and Burnie Gifts and Adam Burbridge was 2nd in the Stawell Gift. Jim Bradley continued to coach junior athletes into his 90s. His last success was Sam Jamieson who won the prestigious Don Furness sprint over 70m. Jamieson left Bradley in 2007 and won the 2008 Stawell Gift under his new coach. After a short illness, Bradley died aged 94, on July 2, 2015.

Apart from speedball and bodyweight exercises, Bradley espoused a diet of steak & chips, with plenty of vegetables & fruit.

Jim Bradley wrote a book about his life in athletics, published in 2004: Athletics My Way.

== Major gift/race winners in Australia ==
Stawell Gift

- 1991 Steve Brimacombe
- 1995 Glenn Crawford

Bay Sheffield

- 1991 Steve Brimacombe
- 1993 Ryan Witnish
- 2000 Craig Brown

Burnie Gift

- 1990 Robert Kirsopp
- 2001 Craig Brown

Devonport Gift (400m)

- 1989 David Krushka

Maryborough Gift

- 1990 David Clarke

Bendigo Thousand Gift

- 1990 Simon Smith

Bendigo Black Opal (400m)

- 2002 Robert Halge

Ballarat Gift

- 1995 Vince Cavallo

Keilor Gift

- 1994 Steve Brimacombe
- 1997 Steve Warden
- 1999 James Clarke

== Bibliography ==
- Bradley, J. (2004). Athletics My Way. Creative Rural Printers, St Arnaud, Victoria. ISBN 0-646-43472-1.
