= Oluyemi Kayode =

Nigerian sprinter (1968–1994)

Personal information
- Born: 7 July 1968
- Died: 1 October 1994 (aged 26)
Medal record
Men's athletics
Representing Nigeria
Olympic Games
Silver medal – second place	1992 Barcelona	4 × 100 m
African Championships
Silver medal – second place	1993 Durban	200 m
Silver medal – second place	1993 Durban	4×100 m

Oluyemi Kayode (7 July 1968 – 1 October 1994) was a Nigerian sprinter.

Kayode was an All-American sprinter for the BYU Cougars track and field team, placing runner-up in the 200 metres at the 1993 NCAA Division I Outdoor Track and Field Championships.

Kayode won the silver medal in 4 × 100 m relay at the 1992 Olympic Games in Barcelona, Spain, together with teammates Chidi Imoh, Olapade Adeniken and Davidson Ezinwa. He also won a silver medal in 200 metres at the 1993 African Championships and was Nigerian national champion on that distance in 1993 and 1994 respectively. He finished sixth in the 200 metres at the 1994 Commonwealth Games.

== Death ==
Kayode died in a car accident in Northern Arizona in October 1994. A stadium in Ado-Ekiti is named in his honor.
