= Lamin Marikong =

Gambian sprinter

Personal information
- Nationality: Gambian
- Born: 14 March 1970 (age 56)

Sport
- Sport: Sprinting
- Event: 200 metres

Lamin Marikong (born 14 March 1970) is a Gambian sprinter. He qualified for the 4 × 100 metres finals at the 1990 Commonwealth Games and competed in the men's 200 metres, 400 metres, and 4 × 100 metres relay at the 1992 Summer Olympics before becoming a coach.

== Career ==
In 1989, Marikong set his 200 metres personal best of 21.2 seconds.

Marikong competed in the 200 metres, 400 metres, and 4 × 100 m relay at the 1990 Commonwealth Games. He placed 7th in his 200 m heat in 22.37 seconds and was 8th in his 400 m heat running 49.75, not advancing in both events. In the relay semi-finals, he ran second leg for the Gambian team to place 4th in 41.87 seconds, qualifying for the finals. He switched to third leg in the finals, where his team finished 8th in 41.65 seconds.

Marikong entered the same three events at the 1992 Olympics. In the fifth 200 m heat, he ran 22.33 seconds to place 6th and did not advance while he was disqualified in his 400 metres heat. In the relay, Marikong anchored the Gambian team to a 40.98-second time, finishing 6th in their heat and not advancing.

At a separate meeting in 1992, Marikong set his 100 metres and 400 metres personal bests of 10.6 seconds and 47.9 seconds respectively.

== Personal life ==
Marikong was said to have "represented Gambia in great ways" in reflection during the 2021 Summer Olympics. After retiring from athletics, Marikong became a coach.

Marikong coached the Gambian team at the 2013 African Youth Athletics Championships. He specifically coached Tijan Keita to a 400 metres African U18 record 47.39-second time despite what he said were difficult heat conditions. He spoke at a reception honoring his athletes.

Two years later, he was the coach of eight Gambian athletes at the 2015 African Junior Athletics Championships. He said the team performance was "extremely good" despite not winning medals because training conditions were not ideal.
