= Kriengkrai Narom =

Thai sprinter

Personal information
- Nationality: Thai
- Born: 9 November 1964 (age 61)

Sport
- Sport: Sprinting
- Event: 4 × 100 metres relay

Kriengkrai Narom (born 9 November 1964) is a Thai sprinter. He competed in the men's 4 × 100 metres relay at the 1992 Summer Olympics.
