= Kouame Aholou =

Togolese sprinter (born 1970)

Personal information
- Nationality: Togolese
- Born: 14 October 1970 (age 55)

Sport
- Sport: Sprinting
- Event: 4 × 100 metres relay

Kouame Calixte Aholou (born 14 October 1970) is a Togolese former sprinter. He competed in the men's 4 × 100 metres relay at the 1992 Summer Olympics.
