= Satoru Inoue =

Japanese sprinter (born 1971)

Personal information
- Nationality: Japanese
- Born: 21 July 1971 (age 55) Kishiwada, Japan
- Education: Nihon University
- Height: 1.68 m (5 ft 6 in)
- Weight: 65 kg (143 lb)

Sport
- Country: Japan
- Sport: Track and field
- Event: 100 metres

Achievements and titles
- Personal bests: 100 m: 10.20 (1991); 200 m: 20.72 (1993)
Medal record
Men's athletics
Representing Japan
Asian Games
Gold medal – first place	1994 Hiroshima	4×100 m relay
Universiade
Silver medal – second place	1993 Buffalo	4×100 m relay

Satoru Inoue (井上悟, Inoue Satoru; born 21 July 1971) is a retired Japanese athlete who specialised in sprinting events. He represented his country at the 1992 and 1996 Summer Olympics as well as four World Championships. His best individual success was reaching the semifinals at the 1993 World Championships in Stuttgart. He became the first Japanese to reach the 100 metres semifinal at the World Championships. He was the former Japanese record holder in the 100 metres and 200 metres, and a two-time Japanese Championships champion in the 100 metres. He played gymnastics before turning to athletics.

== Competition record ==
Year	Competition	Venue	Position	Event	Notes
Representing Japan
1990	World Junior Championships	Plovdiv, Bulgaria	12th (sf)	100 m	10.57
1990	World Junior Championships	Plovdiv, Bulgaria	9th (h)	4 × 100 m relay	40.55
1991	World Championships	Tokyo, Japan	13th (qf)	100 m	10.21
1991	World Championships	Tokyo, Japan	11th (h)	4 × 100 m relay	39.19
1992	Olympic Games	Barcelona, Spain	22nd (qf)	100 m	10.50
1992	Olympic Games	Barcelona, Spain	6th	4 × 100 m relay	38.77
1993	Universiade	Buffalo, United States	5th	200 m	20.84
1993	Universiade	Buffalo, United States	2nd	4 × 100 m relay	38.97
1993	World Championships	Stuttgart, Germany	15th (sf)	100 m	10.39
1993	World Championships	Stuttgart, Germany	11th (sf)	4 × 100 m relay	39.01
1994	Asian Games	Hiroshima, Japan	4th	100 m	10.41
1994	Asian Games	Hiroshima, Japan	1st	4 × 100 m relay	39.37
1995	World Championships	Gothenburg, Sweden	47th (h)	100 m	10.56
1995	World Championships	Gothenburg, Sweden	5th	4 × 100 m relay	39.33
1996	Olympic Games	Atlanta, United States	–	4 × 100 m relay	DQ
1997	World Championships	Athens, Greece	11th (sf)	4 × 100 m relay	38.89

== National titles ==
- Japanese Championships
  - 100 m: 1993, 1994

== Personal bests ==
Outdoor

- 100 metres – 10.20 (+0.5 m/s, Tokyo 1991): Former national record
- 200 metres – 20.72 (+0.4 m/s, Tokyo 1993): Former national record

Indoor

- 60 metres – 6.71 (Bielefeld 1998)
