= Sam Jefferson =

American sprinter (1971–2001)

Personal information
- Born: Samuel Jefferson; April 19, 1971
- Died: January 20, 2001 (aged 29)

Sport
- Country: United States
- Sport: Athletics
- Event: Sprinting
Medal record
Representing United States
Universiade
Gold medal – first place	1993 Buffalo	4x100 m relay
Silver medal – second place	1993 Buffalo	100 m
Goodwill Games
Gold medal – first place	1994 Saint Petersburg	4x100 m relay
IAAF World Cup
Bronze medal – third place	1994 London	4x100 m relay

Samuel Jefferson (April 19, 1971 – January 20, 2001) was an American sprinter.

A native of Waco, Texas, Jefferson attended Waco High School and was a track and field athlete for the University of Houston. He claimed the 100 and 200 meter sprint double at the 1993 Southwest Conference Championships and was the outdoor 100 meters champion at the 1994 NCAA Division I Championships.

Jefferson won the 100 meters silver medal at the 1993 University Games in Buffalo, behind Daniel Effiong. As a 4 × 100 metres relay runner, Jefferson also won a gold medal in Buffalo, as well as at the 1994 Goodwill Games.

In 2001, Jefferson died in his home town of Waco of an undisclosed illness.
