= Dion Bentley =

American long jumper

Personal information
- Nationality: American
- Born: August 26, 1971 (age 54) Penn Hills, Pennsylvania, U.S.
- Height: 6 ft 4 in (1.93 m)
- Weight: 185 lb (84 kg)

Sport
- Sport: Track and field
- Event: Long jump
- College team: Florida Gators

Achievements and titles
- Personal best: LJ: 8.39 m (New Orleans 1993)
Medal record
Men's athletics
Representing the United States
World Junior Championships
Silver medal – second place	1990 Plovdiv	Long jump
Pan American Junior Championships
Gold medal – first place	1989 Santa Fe	Long jump
Gold medal – first place	1989 Santa Fe	4×100 m relay

Dion Bentley (born August 26, 1971) is an American long jumper.

Bentley attended Penn Hills High School, where he had a stellar track career, including setting the still current American Junior record in the long jump. He was Track and Field News "High School Athlete of the Year" in 1989.

He went to the University of Florida, where he continued to compete in the long jump and holds the Gators' indoor (26 ft 8 1/4 in or 8.13 m) and outdoor (27 ft 6 1/2 in or 8.39 m) records. Bentley had the unfortunate timing of reaching the elite ranks at the peak of the careers of Carl Lewis, Mike Powell, Larry Myricks and Joe Greene among others, reaching as high as #6 on the U.S. rankings in 1994 in his three visits to the top ten. As of 2013, he ranks as #50 on the all-time world performer list.

Awards
Preceded by Art Skipper	Track & Field News High School Boys Athlete of the Year; 1989	Succeeded by Chris Nelloms
