= Paul Parkinson (athlete) =

Sierra Leonean sprinter (born 1969)

Personal information
- Nationality: Sierra Leonean
- Born: 10 August 1969 (age 56)

Sport
- Sport: Sprinting
- Event: 4 × 100 metres relay

Paul Parkinson (born 10 August 1969) is a Sierra Leonean sprinter. He competed in the men's 4 × 100 metres relay at the 1992 Summer Olympics.

Originally from Freetown, Parkinson was part of the North London Athletic Club. Half of Sierra Leone's 1992 Olympic athletics team actually came from London.
