= Steve Brimacombe =

Australian sprinter

Personal information
- Full name: Steven Brimacombe
- Nationality: Australian
- Born: 7 May 1971 (age 55)

Sport
- Sport: Running
- Event(s): 100 yards, 100 metres, 200 metres
Medal record
Men's Athletics
Representing Australia
World Championships
Silver medal – second place	1995 Gothenburg	4x100 m relay
Commonwealth Games
Bronze medal – third place	1998 Kuala Lumpur	4x100 m relay

Steve Brimacombe (born 7 May 1971) is an Australian athletics coach and former runner.

Under the tutelage of renowned Scottish coach Jim Bradley, Brimacombe won the 1991 Stawell Gift after only 8 months of training. At the time he was only 19 and the second youngest winner in Stawell Gift history. In December 1991, Brimacombe won the prestigious Bay Sheffield off 3.75m.

On 28 December 1992, Brimacombe set a Colley Reserve track record of 12.28secs off scratch in his semi-final of the prestigious Bay Sheffield.

In 1994, Brimacombe caused a huge upset when he won the Australian 200m title beating Dean Capobianco and Damien Marsh who had both run in the 200m world championship final in 1993. A fortnight after winning the Australian 200m title, Brimacombe finished 2nd in the 1994 Stawell Gift off scratch, recording 12.18secs - this equalled the Stawell track record by an Australian for 120m. In July 1994, Brimacombe was a finalist in the Commonwealth Games 200m.

Brimacombe moved to Queensland in October 1994 and competed over 200 metres in the 1996 Olympic Games in Atlanta where he finished 9th overall, just missing the final. He was an integral member of Australia's 4 × 100 m relay team from 1995 to 1999, winning a silver medal at the 1995 World Championships in Athletics in Gothenburg and a bronze medal at the 1998 Commonwealth Games in Kuala Lumpur.

Brimacombe was a three times national 200m champion (1994, 1995, 1997) and won the 100m title in 1997. His personal best for the 100m was 10.28 secs and for the 200m was 20.30 secs.

He returned to Victoria in 2001 and continued to compete until he retired in 2004. Brimacombe became only the fourth Stawell Gift winner in history to have later coached a winner, when his charge Adrian Mott stormed home in 2006.

He was an inaugural inductee into the Bay Sheffield Hall of Fame.

Steve's mother Dianne has also competed in Victorian Athletics in longer distance events and has been very competitive in her age group with Coburg Harriers.
