= Mark Ladbrook =

Australian sprinter

Personal information
- Born: 8 February 1972 (age 54) Melbourne, Victoria, Australia

Sport
- Sport: Track and field

Mark Daniel Ladbrook (born 8 February 1972) is an Australian track and field athlete who specialises in the 400m.

Ladbrook represented Australia at the 1996 Summer Olympics in the 400m and the 4 × 400 m. He did not make it past the heats in the 400m, but reached the semi-finals in the relay. He is the National Champion in the 400m at the 1996 National Championships

In 2020, Ladbrook won the prestigious Bay Sheffield footrace held at Glenelg, South Australia and later competed in the annual Stawell Gift professional race, making the Gift final and winning the 70m. and also coached Lauren Hewitt in the lead-up to the 2004 Summer Olympics.

In more recent times, Ladbrook has become a private athletics coach for both amateur and professional athletes, mainly based in his home of Melbourne.

Since January 2016, Ladbrook has taught at Trinity Grammar School in Kew, Victoria as the Head of Athletic Development and Training. As part of this role, Ladbrook is a coach of the school's athletics team.

Mark Ladbrook headed up athletics at The Southport School on the Gold Coast and more recently Somerset College. He coaches Alex Beck, a former Somerset College student, and Bond University graduate who is racing the 400m at the Tokyo 2020 Summer Olympics.
