= Joel Lamela =

Cuban sprinter (born 1971)

Personal information
- Full name: Joel Lamela Loaces
- Born: January 29, 1971 (age 55) Nuevitas, Camagüey, Cuba
Medal record
Men's athletics
Representing Cuba
Olympic Games
Bronze medal – third place	1992 Barcelona	4x100 m relay
Pan American Games
Gold medal – first place	1991 Havana	4x100 m relay
CAC Junior Championships (U20)
Gold medal – first place	1990 Havana	4x100 m relay
Bronze medal – third place	1990 Havana	100 m
Summer Universiade
Bronze medal – third place	1993 Buffalo	4x100 m relay

Joel Lamela Loaces (born January 29, 1971) is a former sprinter from Cuba.

== Career ==
He won an Olympic bronze medal in 4 x 100 metres relay in Barcelona 1992. He specialized in the 100 metres event, and his personal best of 10.53 was set during the 1991 World Championships.

== International competitions ==
Year	Competition	Venue	Position	Event	Notes
Representing Cuba
1990	Central American and Caribbean Junior Championships (U-20)	Havana, Cuba	3rd	100 m	10.61 (-0.1 m/s)
1990	Central American and Caribbean Junior Championships (U-20)	Havana, Cuba	4th	200 m	21.56 (-0.9 m/s)
1990	Central American and Caribbean Junior Championships (U-20)	Havana, Cuba	1st	4 × 100 m relay	40.62
1990	World Junior Championships	Plovdiv, Bulgaria	20th (qf)	100m	10.72 (+0.5 m/s)
1990	World Junior Championships	Plovdiv, Bulgaria	33rd (h)	200m	22.09 (+0.8 m/s)
1990	World Junior Championships	Plovdiv, Bulgaria	8th	4 × 100 m relay	40.25
1991	Pan American Games	Havana, Cuba	1st	4 × 100 m relay	39.08
1991	World Championships	Tokyo, Japan	4th (h)	100 m	10.53
1991	World Championships	Tokyo, Japan	5th (h)	4 × 100 m relay	39.15
1992	Ibero-American Championships	Seville, Spain	2nd	200m	21.12 (-2.6 m/s)
1992	Ibero-American Championships	Seville, Spain	1st	4 × 100 m relay	39.19
1992	Olympic Games	Barcelona, Spain	3rd	4 × 100 m relay	38.00
1993	Universiade	Buffalo, United States	3rd	4 × 100 m	39.20
1994	Ibero-American Championships	Mar del Plata, Argentina	1st	4 × 100 m relay	39.99
1995	Pan American Games	Mar del Plata, Argentina	1st	4 × 100 m relay	38.67
1995	World Championships	Gothenburg, Sweden	—	4 × 100 m relay	DSQ
