= Hisatsugu Suzuki =

Japanese sprinter

Personal information
- Born: 22 November 1970 (age 55) Aichi Prefecture, Japan
- Height: 1.80 m (5 ft 11 in)
- Weight: 70 kg (154 lb)

Sport
- Sport: Track and field
- Event: 100 metres
Medal record
Representing Japan
Summer Universiade
Silver medal – second place	1993 Buffalo	4x100 m relay
Asian Games
Bronze medal – third place	1990 Beijing	4x100 m relay

Hisatsugu Suzuki (鈴木 久嗣, Suzuki Hisatsugu; born 22 November 1970) is a retired Japanese athlete who specialised in sprinting events. He represented his country at the 1992 Summer Olympics as well as one indoor and two outdoor World Championships.

== Competition record ==
Year	Competition	Venue	Position	Event	Notes
Representing Japan
1992	Olympic Games	Barcelona, Spain	6th	4 × 100 m relay	38.77
1993	World Indoor Championships	Toronto, Canada	21st (h)	60 m	6.78
1993	Universiade	Buffalo, United States	2nd	4 × 100 m relay	38.97
1993	World Championships	Stuttgart, Germany	44th (h)	100 m	10.72
1993	World Championships	Stuttgart, Germany	12th (h)	4 × 100 m relay	39.40
1995	World Championships	Gothenburg, Sweden	5th	4 × 100 m relay	39.33

== Personal bests ==
Outdoor

- 100 metres – 10.30 (+1.0 m/s, Sapporo 1992)

Indoor

- 60 metres – 6.77 (Dortmund 1997)
