= Thomas Renner =

Austrian sprinter

Personal information
- Nationality: Austrian
- Born: 24 December 1967 (age 58)

Sport
- Sport: Sprinting
- Event: 4 × 100 metres relay

Thomas Renner (born 24 December 1967) is an Austrian sprinter. He competed in the men's 4 × 100 metres relay at the 1992 Summer Olympics.
