= Wayne Watson (sprinter) =

Jamaican sprinter

Personal information
- Born: 26 March 1965 (age 61)

Sport
- Country: Jamaica
- Sport: Athletics
- Event: Sprinting
Medal record
Central American and Caribbean Games
Bronze medal – third place	1990 Mexico City	100 metres
Commonwealth Games
Bronze medal – third place	1990 Auckland	4×100 metres

Wayne Watson (born 26 March 1965) is a Jamaican former athlete who competed as a sprinter.

A product of Ferncourt High School in the town of Claremont, Jamaica, Watson was a college athlete in the United States, first for New York Institute of Technology and then Alabama A&M University in Huntsville, where he twice earned NCAA Division II All-American honors. In 2020 he joined the Huntsville-Madison County Athletic Hall of Fame.

Watson's competitive appearances included the 1989 World Indoor Championships, 1990 Goodwill Games, 1991 Pan American Games, 1991 World Championships, 1993 World Championships and two editions of the World University Games. He was third in the 100 metres at the 1990 Central American and Caribbean Games and also took bronze at the 1990 Commonwealth Games in Auckland as a member of the 4 × 100 metres relay team.
