= Mark Davidson (athlete) =

Scottish sprinter (born 1968)

Personal information
- Born: 15 November 1968 (age 57) Aberdeen, Scotland, Great Britain
Medal record
Men's Athletics
Representing Scotland
Commonwealth Games
Silver medal – second place	1990 Auckland	4x400m relay

Mark Davidson (born 15 November 1968) is a Scottish former sprinter and hurdling athlete who specialised in the 400m hurdles. As of 2017, he is the President of his local athletics club, Aberdeen AAC.

Under the stewardship of long-term coach Dr Robert Masson, Davidson set personal best times of 46.9 in the 400m and 50.79 in the 400m H in 1989. He has since competed as a veteran athlete, travelling to the European Masters' Athletics Championships in Budapest in 2014, where he qualified for the final of the 60m.

In 1990, he was part of the Scotland 4 × 400 m relay team who won a silver medal at the Auckland Commonwealth Games in New Zealand. Also featuring David Strang, Tom McKean, and Brian Whittle, the Scottish athletes set a time of 3:04:68s. In the same competition, Davidson represented Scotland in the 4 × 100 m alongside David Clark, Elliot Bunney, and James Henderson. They would go on to finish 6th in the final whilst setting a time of 39.61s. In the individual event of the 400m H, Davidson clocked 52.17s in the semi-final stages.

As of 2017, Davidson still holds a number of AAAC club records, including the 100m, 200m, 400m, and 400m H.

Davidson continues his lifelong commitment to athletics; he is a qualified sprints coach and tutors a number of athletes in the Aberdeen area alongside Dr Masson.
