= Rod Mapstone =

Australian sprinter

Personal information
- Born: 19 November 1969 (age 56) Fremantle, Western Australia, Australia

Sport
- Sport: Track and field

Rodney John "Rod" Mapstone (born 19 November 1969) is a former Australian sprinter who competed in the men's 100m competition at the 1996 Summer Olympics. He recorded a 10.56, not enough to qualify for the next round past the heats. His personal best is 10.17, set in 1996. He was also a part of the Australian 4 × 100 m team, which finished first in its heat with a time of 38.93. They were subsequently disqualified due to a false start in the semifinals.
