= Gilles Bogui =

Ivorian sprinter

Personal information
- Nationality: Ivorian
- Born: 26 December 1972 (age 53)

Sport
- Sport: Sprinting
- Event: 4 × 100 metres relay
Medal record
Men's athletics
Representing Ivory Coast
African Championships
Bronze medal – third place	1990 Cairo	4×100 m

Gilles Bogui (born 26 December 1972) is an Ivorian sprinter. He competed in the men's 4 × 100 metres relay at the 1992 Summer Olympics.
