= Innocent Asonze =

Nigerian sprinter

Medal record

Men's athletics

World Championships
Disqualified	1999 Seville	4x100 m relay

Innocent Asonze (born 13 December 1972) is a former sprinter from Nigeria. Together with Francis Obikwelu, Daniel Effiong and Deji Aliu he won a bronze medal in 4 x 100 metres relay at the 1999 World Championships in Athletics, but the team was later disqualified (in August 2005) because he failed a doping test in June 1999.

== Personal bests ==
- 100 metres - 10.04 (1997)
- 200 metres - 20.88 (1991)

== See also ==
- List of sportspeople sanctioned for doping offences
