= Daniel Effiong =

Nigerian sprinter (born 1972)

Personal information
- Born: 17 June 1972 (age 54) Calabar, Nigeria
Medal record
Men's athletics
Representing Nigeria
World Championships
Disqualified	1999 Seville	4x100 m
African Championships
Gold medal – first place	1993 Durban	100 m
Silver medal – second place	1993 Durban	4×100 m
Summer Universiade
Gold medal – first place	1993 Buffalo	100 m
Silver medal – second place	1991 Sheffield	200 m

Daniel Effiong (born 17 June 1972) is a Nigerian retired sprinter. He became African 100 metres and Universiade champion in 1993. Together with Innocent Asonze, Francis Obikwelu and Deji Aliu he won a bronze medal in 4 x 100 metres relay at the 1999 World Championships, but the team was later disqualified (in August 2005) because Innocent Asonze failed a doping test in June 1999.

In 100 metres his personal best time was 9.98 seconds, achieved in the semifinal of the 1993 World Championships. This ranks him sixth in Nigeria, behind Olusoji Fasuba, Davidson Ezinwa, Olapade Adeniken, Francis Obikwelu and Uchenna Emedolu.

In 200 metres his personal best time was 20.10 seconds, achieved in May 1994 in Mount Sac. This ranks him second in Nigeria, only behind Francis Obikwelu, and fourth in Africa, behind Frankie Fredericks, Obikwelu and Stéphan Buckland.

He missed the 1995 World Championships in Athletics due to a failed drug test at the Nigerian Championships, where he tested positive for methyltestosterone and ephedrine. He received a four-year ban from the sport.

With fellow athlete Tina Chikezie he had a daughter Rosey Effiong who became an international runner for the United States.

== Achievements ==
Year	Competition	Venue	Position	Event	Notes
Representing Nigeria
1994	Commonwealth Games	Victoria, Canada	3rd	200 m	20.40 s

== See also ==
- List of doping cases in athletics
