= Juan Jesús Trapero =

Spanish sprinter

Personal information
- Born: 21 December 1969 (age 56) Santander, Spain

Sport
- Sport: Track and field
Medal record
Representing Spain
Mediterranean Games
Silver medal – second place	1991 Athens	4x100m relay

Juan Jesús Trapero Hidalgo (born 21 December 1969) is a former Spanish sprinter who competed in the men's 100m competition at the 1992 Summer Olympics. He recorded a 10.64, not enough to qualify for the next round past the heats. His personal best is 10.35, set in 1992. He also ran a leg for the Spanish 4 × 100 m relay team, which advanced to the semifinals with a time of 39.60, but did not advance further, posting a 39.62 in the semis.
