= Franz Ratzenberger =

Austrian sprinter

Personal information
- Born: 30 March 1965 (age 60) Grieskirchen, Austria
- Height: 1.83 m (6 ft 0 in)
- Weight: 86 kg (190 lb)

Sport
- Sport: Athletics
- Event(s): 100 m, 200 m

Franz Ratzenberger (born 30 March 1965 in Grieskirchen) is an Austrian former sprinter. He represented his country at the 1992 Summer Olympics as well as one outdoor and two indoor World Championships.

In 1993 he tested positive for a banned steroid Metandienone and was subsequently banned from competition for two years. That same year he retired from the sport.

== Personal bests ==
Outdoor

- 100 metres – 10.34 (+1.1 m/s, Linz 1992)

Indoor

- 60 metres – 6.62 (Vienna 1992)
- 200 metres – 21.65 (Seville 1991)
