= Athletics at the 1993 Summer Universiade =

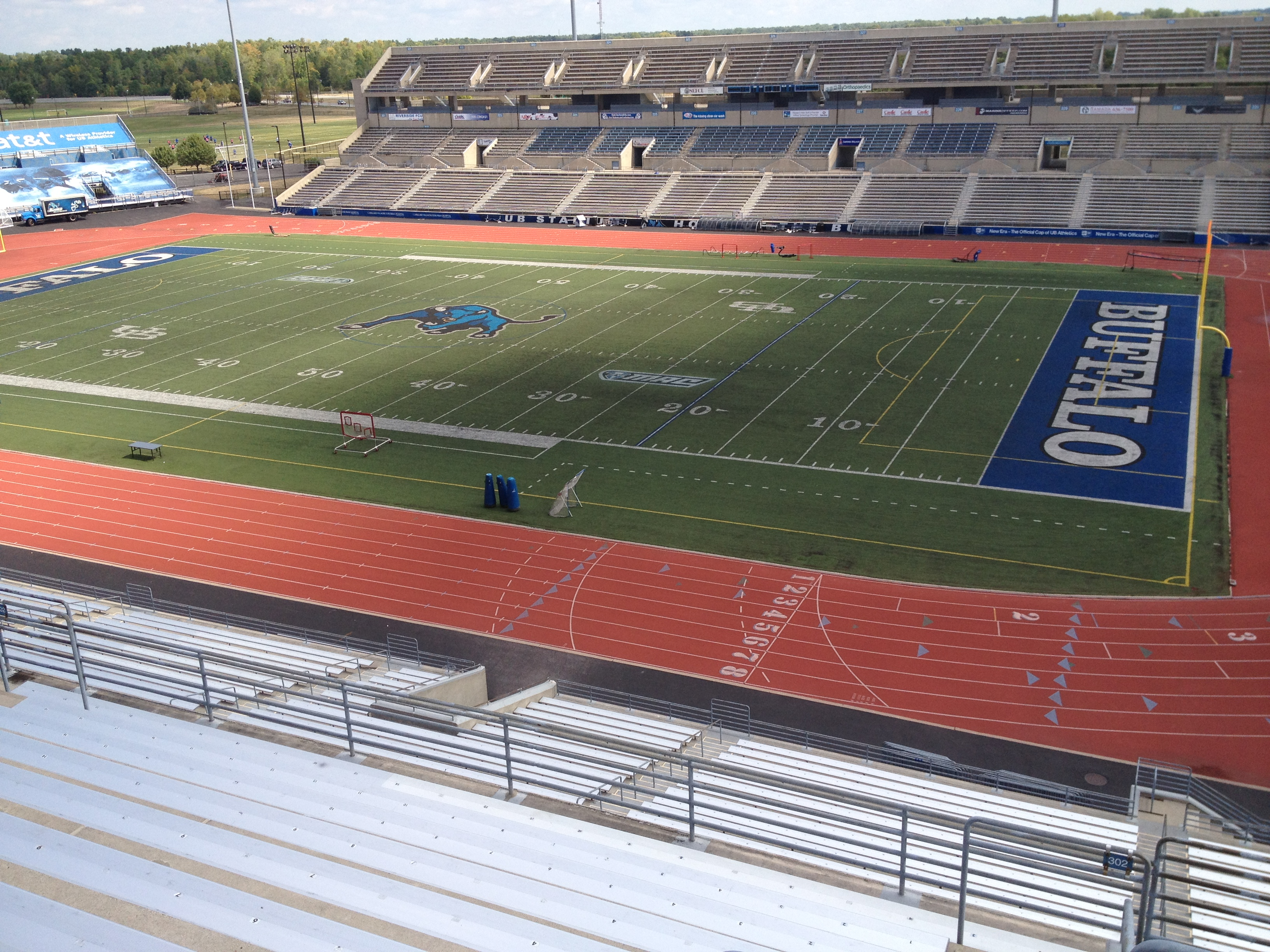
- The host stadium in 2012
- Dates: July 14–18, 1993
- Host city: Buffalo, New York; United States
- Venue: University at Buffalo Stadium
- Events: 43
- Records set: 2 Games records

At the 1993 Summer Universiade, the athletics events were held at the University at Buffalo Stadium in Amherst, New York, in the United States, from July 14 to 18. A total of 43 events were contested, of which 23 by male and 20 by female athletes.

Variable and windy conditions meant that performances were lower compared to previous years. However, two Universiade records were broken during the competition; Kenya's Kennedy Manyisa improved the men's marathon time and Robert Korzeniowski of Poland bettered the 20 km walk standard. The women's 3000 metres was contested for the last time at the games and it was replaced by the 5000 metres from 1995 onwards.

Derrick Adkins, István Bagyula, Aleksandr Klimenko and Robert Korzeniowski, champions at the 1991 Universiade, all returned and defended their titles. Korzeniowski and Adkins went on to win Olympic gold medals at the 1996 Atlanta Olympics, as did hammer throw runner-up Balázs Kiss and pole vault bronze medallist Jean Galfione. Moroccan Khalid Khannouchi won his first international medal in the 5000 metres and permanently settled in the United States around this period.

The United States, the host nation, easily topped the medal table with fourteen gold medals and thirty-seven medals in total. Poland won the next highest number of events, with three gold medallists, while Cuba had the next highest total medal tally with eight medals. Germany, Romania, Ukraine and Japan were other nations who performed well. Thirty-seven nations reached the medal table in the athletics competition. All athletes from Yugoslavia competed as independent participants, due to United Nations sanctions.

== Medal summary ==
=== Men ===
Event	Gold		Silver		Bronze	
100 metres (Wind: 2.6 m/s)	Daniel Effiong (NGR)	10.07w	Sam Jefferson (USA)	10.13w	Glenroy Gilbert (CAN)	10.14w
200 metres (Wind: 2.4 m/s)	Bryan Bridgewater (USA)	20.14w	Chris Nelloms (USA)	20.17w	Iván García (CUB)	20.55w
400 metres	Ibrahim Hassan (GHA)	45.87	Evon Clarke (JAM)	46.27	Danny McFarlane (JAM)	46.60
800 metres	Marko Koers (NED)	1:48.57	Oleg Stepanov (RUS)	1:49.50	Nico Motchebon (GER)	1:49.52
1500 metres	Abdelkader Chékhémani (FRA)	3:46.32	Bill Burke (USA)	3:46.33	Gary Lough (GBR)	3:46.77
5000 metres	Khalid Khannouchi (MAR)	14:05.33	Sergey Fedotov (RUS)	14:06.15	Toshinari Takaoka (JPN)	14:06.21
10,000 metres	Antonio Serrano (ESP)	28:16.16	Yasuyuki Watanabe (JPN)	28:17.26	Vincenzo Modica (ITA)	28:17.73
110 metres hurdles	Dietmar Koszewski (GER)	13.48	Glenn Terry (USA)	13.58	Stelios Bisbas (GRE)	13.72
400 metres hurdles	Derrick Adkins (USA)	49.35	Yoshihiko Saito (JPN)	49.61	Dusán Kovács (HUN)	50.12
3000 metres steeplechase	Michael Buchleitner (AUT)	8:30.82	Vladimir Pronin (RUS)	8:32.03	Bizuneh Yae Tura (ETH)	8:32.07
4 × 100 metres relay	United States (USA); Bryan Bridgewater; David Oaks; Tony Miller; Sam Jefferson	38.65	Japan (JPN); Satoru Inoue; Tatsuo Sugimoto; Hideaki Miyata; Hisatsugu Suzuki	38.97	Cuba (CUB); Joel Isasi; Joel Lamela; Jorge Aguilera; Iván García	39.20
4 × 400 metres relay	United States (USA); Chris Jones; Aaron Payne; Kevin Lyles; Scott Turner	3:02.34	Japan (JPN); Shigekazu Omori; Seiji Inagaki; Yoshihiko Saito; Masayoshi Kan	3:03.21	Hungary (HUN); David Somfai; Dusán Kovács; László Kiss; Miklos Arpasi	3:04.27
Marathon	Kennedy Manyisa (KEN)	2:12:19 GR	Kim Wan-Ki (KOR)	2:15:35	Hyung Jae-Young (KOR)	2:15:53
20 kilometres walk	Robert Korzeniowski (POL)	1:22:01 GR	Daniel García (MEX)	1:22:58	Bernardo Segura (MEX)	1:24:11
High jump	Tony Barton (USA)	2.30 m	Stevan Zorić (IPU)^{†}	2.30 m	Arturo Ortíz (ESP) Ruslan Stipanov (UKR)	2.27 m
Pole vault	István Bagyula (HUN)	5.70 m	Alberto Giacchetto (ITA)	5.60 m	Jean Galfione (FRA)	5.60 m
Long jump	Kareem Streete-Thompson (USA)	8.22 m (w)	Obinna Eregbu (NGR)	8.18 m	Vitaliy Kyrylenko (UKR)	8.04 m
Triple jump	Tosi Fasinro (GBR)	16.91 m (w)	Oleg Sakirkin (KAZ)	16.89 m	Julian Golley (GBR)	16.88 m (w)
Shot put	Aleksandr Klimenko (UKR)	19.72 m	Paolo Dal Soglio (ITA)	19.64 m	Chris Volgenau (USA)	19.54 m
Discus throw	Alexis Elizalde (CUB)	62.98 m	Adewale Olukoju (NGR)	62.96 m	Nick Sweeney (IRL)	62.52 m
Hammer throw	Vadim Kolesnik (UKR)	77.00 m	Balázs Kiss (HUN)	76.88 m	Christophe Épalle (FRA)	76.80 m
Javelin throw	Louis Fouché (RSA)	79.64 m	Ed Kaminski (USA)	77.52 m	Mika Parviainen (FIN)	77.14 m
Decathlon	Sébastien Levicq (FRA)	7874 pts	Indrek Kaseorg (EST)	7864 pts	Darrin Steele (USA)	7653 pts

=== Women ===
Event	Gold		Silver		Bronze	
100 metres (Wind: -2.1 m/s)	Dahlia Duhaney (JAM)	11.56	Liliana Allen (CUB)	11.57	Beatrice Utondu (NGR)	11.59
200 metres (Wind: +3.2 m/s)	Flirtisha Harris (USA)	22.56w	Dahlia Duhaney (JAM)	22.79w	Wang Huei-Chen (TPE)	22.80w
400 metres	Michelle Collins (USA)	52.01	Youlanda Warren (USA)	52.18	Nancy McLeón (CUB)	52.84
800 metres	Amy Wickus (USA)	2:03.72	Inez Turner (JAM)	2:04.14	Daniela Antipov (ROM)	2:04.75
1500 metres	Lynne Robinson (GBR)	4:12.03	Julie Speights (USA)	4:12.43	Sarah Howell (CAN)	4:13.30
3000 metres	Clare Eichner (USA)	9:04.32	Iulia Ionescu (ROM)	9:05.10	Rosalind Taylor (USA)	9:06.25
10,000 metres	Iulia Negură (ROM)	32:22.99	Suzana Ciric (IPU)^{†}	32:26.68	Alina Tecuţa (ROM)	32:29.18
100 metres hurdles	Dawn Bowles (USA)	13.16	Marsha Guialdo (USA)	13.24	Nicole Ramalalanirina (MAD)	13.28
400 metres hurdles	Heike Meissner (GER)	56.10	Debbie-Ann Parris (JAM)	56.11	Trevaia Williams (USA)	56.57
4 × 100 metres relay	United States (USA); Crystal Braddock; Cheryl Taplin; Flirtisha Harris; Chryste Gaines	43.37	Nigeria (NGR); Mary Tombiri; Faith Idehen; Christy Opara; Beatrice Utondu	44.25	Canada (CAN); Katie Anderson; Dionne Wright; Dena Burrows; France Gareau	45.20
4 × 400 metres relay	United States (USA); Crystal Irving; Maicel Malone; Youlanda Warren; Michelle Collins	3:26.18	Cuba (CUB); Nancy McLeón; Yudalis Limonta; Idalmis Bonne; Oraidis Ramirez	3:28.95	Nigeria (NGR); Onyinye Chikezie; Omotayo Akinremi; Olabisi Afolabi; Omolade Akinremi	3:34.97
Marathon	Noriko Kawaguchi (JPN)	2:37:47	Franca Fiacconi (ITA)	2:38:44	Nao Otani (JPN)	2:40:17
10,000 metres walk	Long Yuwen (CHN)	46:16.75	Olga Leonenko (UKR)	46:18.40	Larisa Ramazanova (RUS)	46:18.58
High jump	Tanya Hughes (USA)	1.95 m	Nelė Žilinskienė (LTU)	1.95 m	Larisa Hryhorenko (UKR)	1.95 m
Long jump	Mirela Dulgheru (ROM)	6.69 m (w)	Vanessa Monar-Enweani (CAN)	6.57 m (w)	Daphne Saunders (BAH)	6.53 m
Triple jump	Niurka Montalvo (CUB)	14.16 m (w)	Šárka Kašpárková (CZE)	14.00 m (w)	Monica Toth (ROM)	13.96 m (w)
Shot put	Zhou Tianhua (CHN)	19.17 m	Belsy Laza (CUB)	18.48 m	Katrin Koch (GER)	16.70 m
Discus throw	Renata Katewicz (POL)	62.40 m	Jackie McKernan (GBR)	60.72 m	Anja Gündler (GER)	60.56 m
Javelin throw (Old javelin model)	Lee Young-Sun (KOR)	58.62 m	Tanja Damaske (GER)	57.68 m	Valerie Tulloch (CAN)	56.52 m
Heptathlon	Urszula Włodarczyk (POL)	6127 pts	Birgit Gautzsch (GER)	5934 pts	Kelly Blair (USA)	5926 pts

== Medal table ==
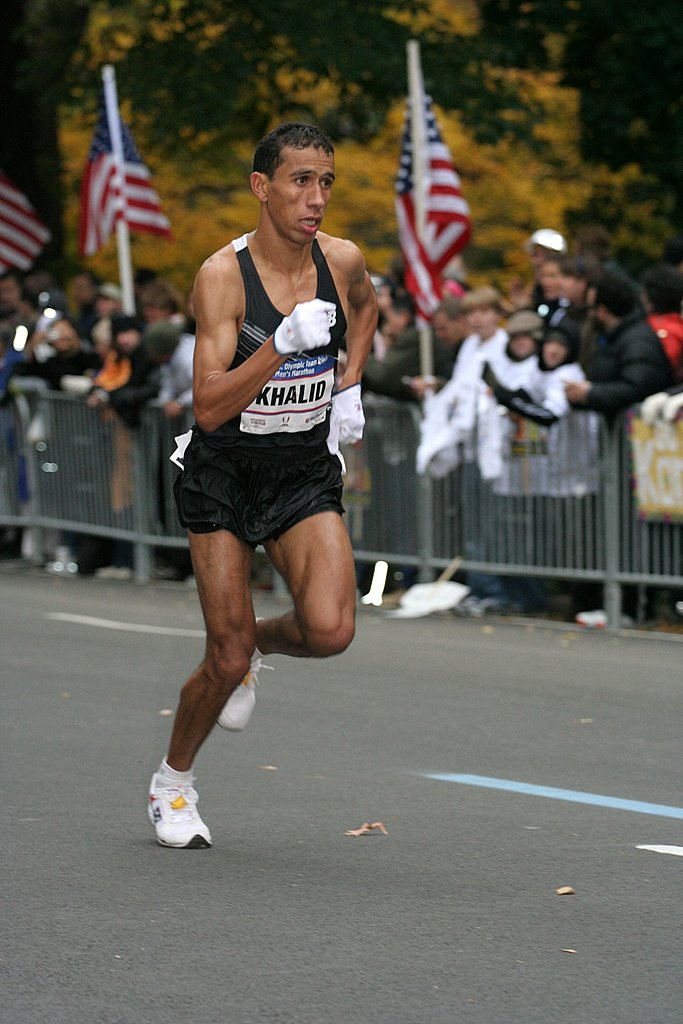
Khalid Khannouchi won his first international medal at the competition.

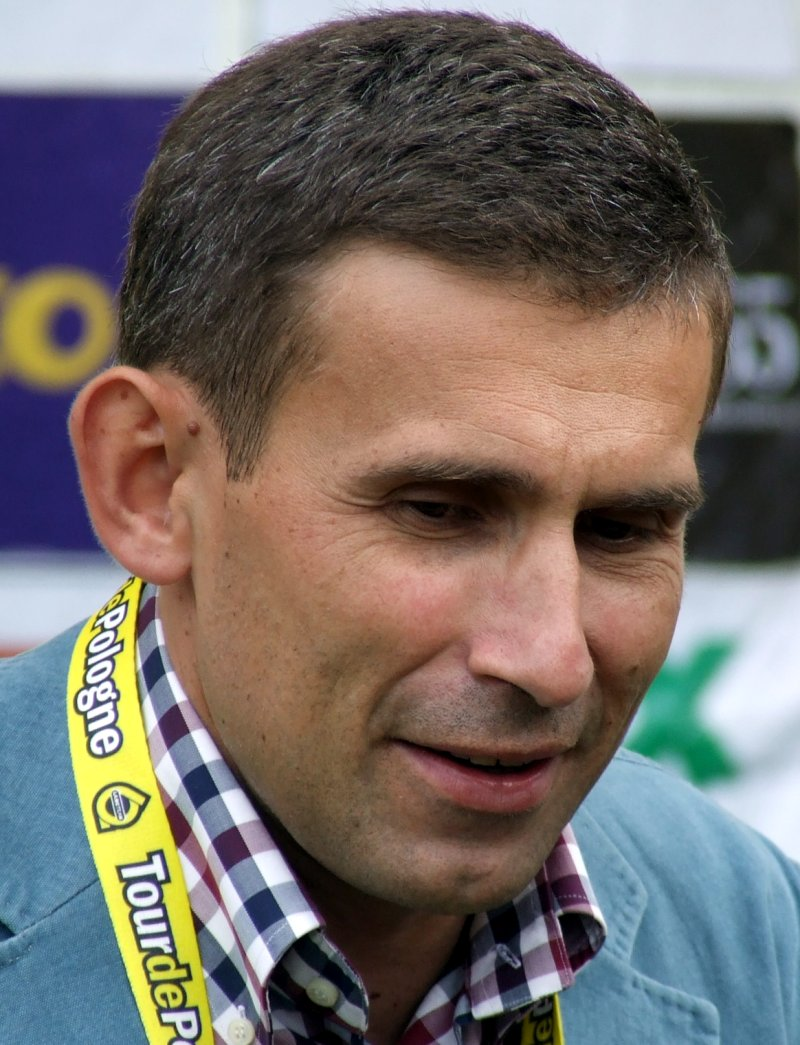
Robert Korzeniowski was one of three Polish gold medallists.

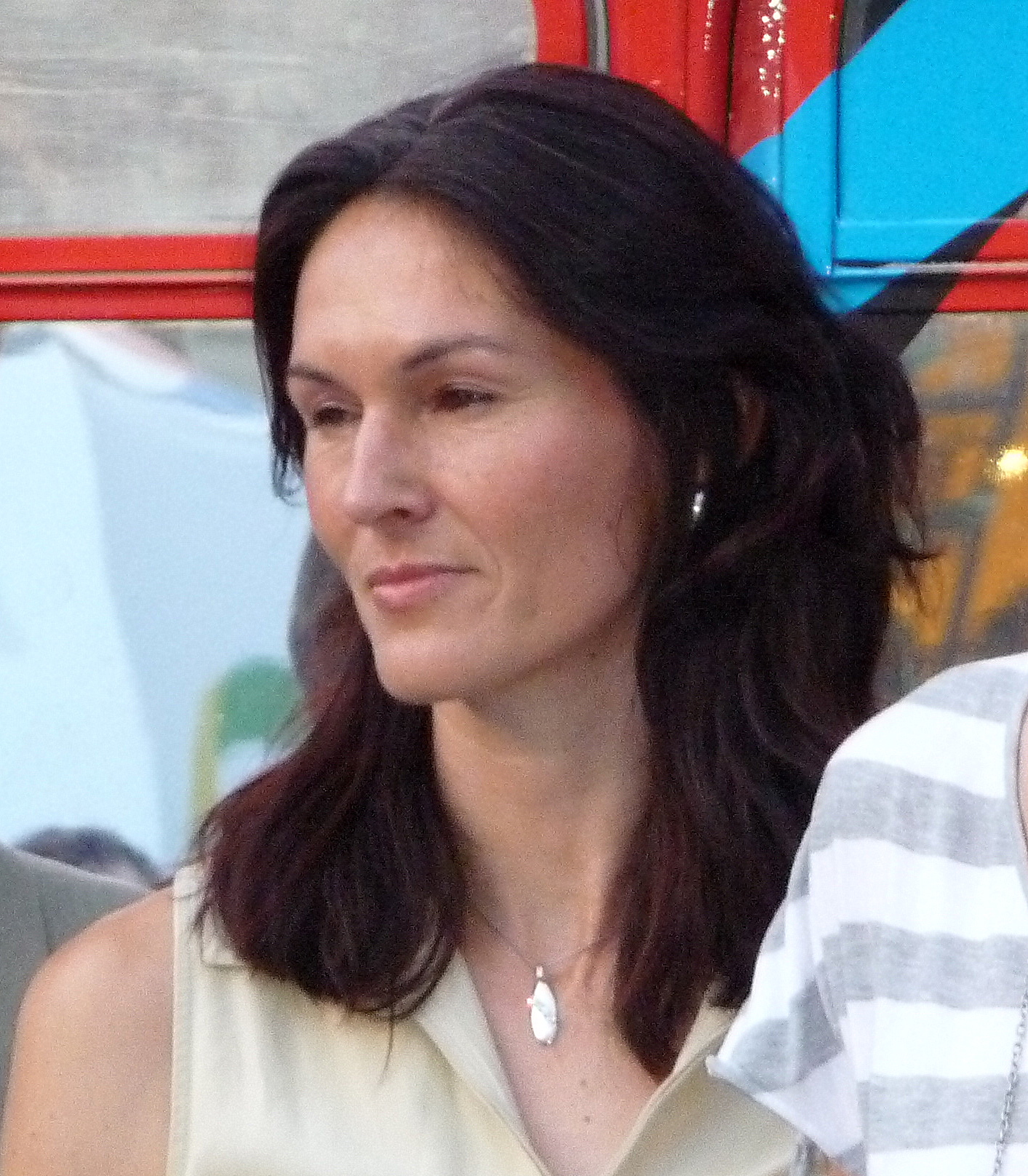
Triple jump runner-up Šárka Kašpárková was the Czech Republic's sole medallist.

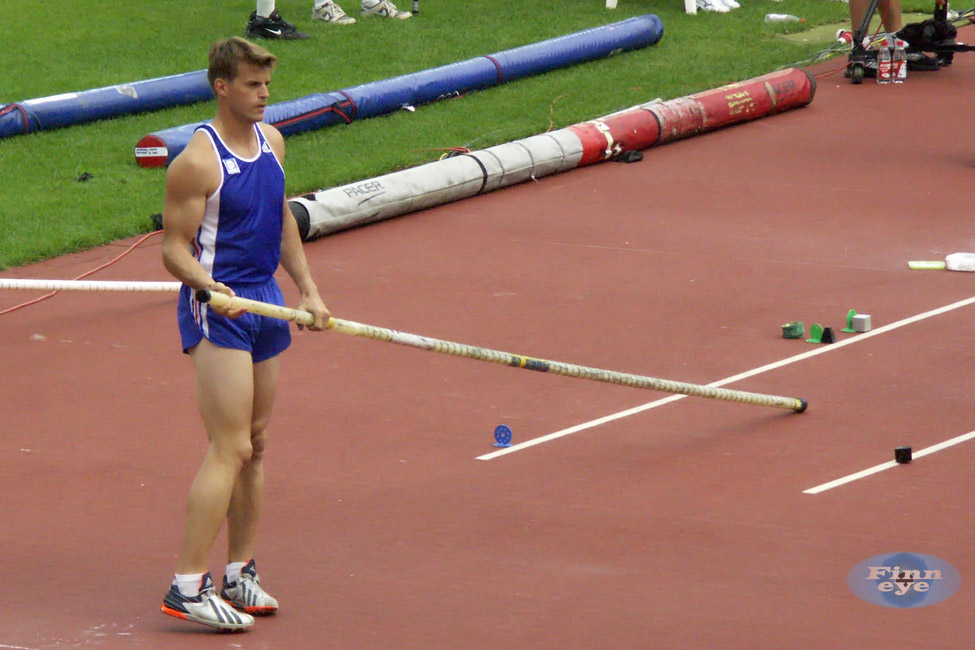
The 1996 Olympic champion Jean Galfione won a bronze for France.

* Host nation (United States)

Rank	Nation	Gold	Silver	Bronze	Total
1	United States*	14	8	5	27
2	Poland	3	0	0	3
3	Cuba	2	3	3	8
4	Germany	2	2	3	7
5	Romania	2	1	3	6
5	Ukraine	2	1	3	6
7	Great Britain	2	1	2	5
8	France	2	0	2	4
9	China	2	0	0	2
10	Japan	1	4	2	7
11	Jamaica	1	4	1	6
12	Nigeria	1	3	2	6
13	Hungary	1	1	2	4
14	South Korea	1	1	1	3
15	Spain	1	0	1	2
16	Austria	1	0	0	1
16	Ghana	1	0	0	1
16	Kenya	1	0	0	1
16	Morocco	1	0	0	1
16	Netherlands	1	0	0	1
16	South Africa	1	0	0	1
22	Italy	0	3	1	4
22	Russia	0	3	1	4
24	Independent Participants†	0	2	0	2
25	Canada	0	1	4	5
26	Mexico	0	1	1	2
27	Czech Republic	0	1	0	1
27	Estonia	0	1	0	1
27	Kazakhstan	0	1	0	1
27	Lithuania	0	1	0	1
31	Bahamas	0	0	1	1
31	Chinese Taipei	0	0	1	1
31	Ethiopia	0	0	1	1
31	Finland	0	0	1	1
31	Greece	0	0	1	1
31	Ireland	0	0	1	1
31	Madagascar	0	0	1	1
Totals (37 entries)		43	43	44	130

- ^{†} = All athletes from Yugoslavia entered the games as "Independent Participants" due to United Nations sanctions against the country.

== See also ==
- 1993 in the sport of athletics
- FISU World University Games
- University and college sport
