= Stadion Plovdiv =

Stadium in Plovdiv, Bulgaria

Coordinates: 42°08′59″N 24°43′11″E

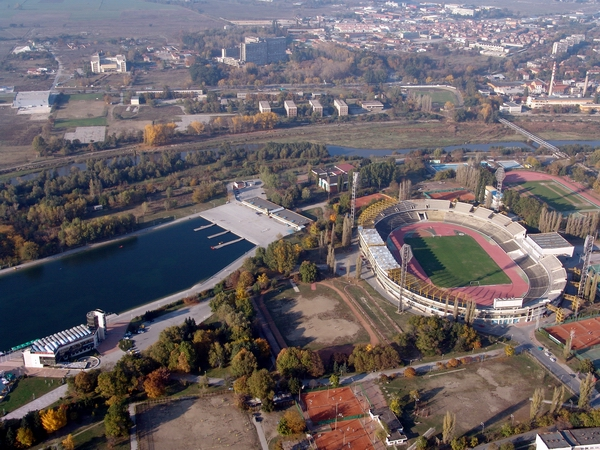
- Aerial view of the stadium.
- Interactive map of Stadion Plovdiv
- Full name: Stadion Plovdiv
- Former names: Stadion Deveti septemvri
- Location: Plovdiv, Bulgaria
- Capacity: 55,000
- Surface: Grass

Construction
- Built: 1950

Stadion Plovdiv (Bulgarian: Стадион „Пловдив“, English: 'Plovdiv Stadium') is a multi-purpose stadium in Plovdiv, Bulgaria. It is currently used mostly for athletics championships. The stadium holds 55,000 since 2008. The stadium was built in 1950.

The stadium initially had a capacity of about 30,000 spectators and had lights. Near the end of the 1980s, a substantial renovation and expansion project began, but was never finished due to a lack of funding. The stadium's present condition is dire, with no UEFA licence, no lights, and only a few games played there (mostly junior teams). It is the only stadium in Bulgaria with two-storey stands. The biggest events held in the stadium were a 1990 Lepa Brena concert, a 1999 Metallica concert, and the 1990 World Junior Championships in Athletics.
