= Tatsuo Sugimoto =

Japanese sprinter

Personal information
- Nationality: Japanese
- Born: 25 November 1970 (age 55) Numazu, Shizuoka, Japan

Sport
- Sport: Sprinting
- Event: 100 metres
Medal record
Men's athletics
Representing Japan
Asian Championships
Silver medal – second place	1998 Fukuoka	4×100 m relay
Summer Universiade
Silver medal – second place	1993 Buffalo	4x100 m relay

Tatsuo Sugimoto (杉本 龍勇, Sugimoto Tatsuo; born 25 November 1970) is a Japanese sprinter. He competed in the men's 100 metres at the 1992 Summer Olympics.
