= Bryan Bridgewater =

American sprinter (born 1970)

Personal information
- Born: September 7, 1970 (age 55) Los Angeles, California, United States

Sport
- Sport: Track and field
Medal record
Representing United States
Summer Universiade
| Gold medal – first place | 1993 Buffalo | 200 m |
| Gold medal – first place | 1993 Buffalo | 4 × 100 m relay |

Bryan Bridgewater (born September 7, 1970) is an American former sprinter.

Bridgewater started running for the West Valley Eagles youth club and Washington High School in Los Angeles. On the youth club he ran with Quincy Watts, but turned into a crosstown high school rival. Often injured, Bridgewater put together an injury free senior year where he beat the future gold medalist and won the 200 metres at the 1988 CIF California State Meet over Watts and future NFL star Curtis Conway. See the race on youtube. He still holds Los Angeles City Section record in the 200 m.

The following year, he won gold medals in the 100 m, 200 m and 4 × 100 metres relay at the 1989 Pan American Junior Athletics Championships. California Junior College College State Champion in the 200 m in 1990, while attending Long Beach City College. Inducted into Long Beach City College athletic hall of fame.

He was a four a time NCAA DII National Champion in the 100 and 200 meters while at California State Los Angeles. But in his senior year 1993 he was sanction for accepting money. In which the NCAA could not prove. It was based on what someone said. Bridgewater went to California State University, Los Angeles, winning the 100 and 200 at the 1993 NCAA Division II Championships. He still holds the Div. II record in the 200.

Later that year he won gold medals in the 200 and 4 × 100 relay at the World University Games. The year earlier, he was on the winning American team at the 1992 IAAF World Cup. He also member of the 1995 Pan American who competed in the 200 m.

Bridgewater achieved two American top 10 rankings in the 200, overshadowed by world stars Carl Lewis, Michael Johnson, Michael Marsh and coincidentally Washington alum Jeff Williams.
