= Osmond Ezinwa =

Nigerian sprinter (born 1971)

Medal record

Men's athletics

Olympic Games
Silver medal – second place	1992 Barcelona	4x100 m relay

World Championships
Silver medal – second place	1997 Athens	4x100 m relay

Osmond Ezinwa (born 22 November 1971) is a former sprinter from Nigeria. Together with Olapade Adeniken, Francis Obikwelu and Davidson Ezinwa he won a silver medal in 4 x 100 metres relay at the 1992 Olympic Games in Barcelona.

He is the identical twin brother of Davidson Ezinwa. Both attended the Christian university Azusa Pacific University.

== Personal bests ==
- 100 metres - 10.05 (1996)
- 200 metres - 20.56 (1997)
