= Damien Marsh =

Australian sprinter

Personal information
- Born: 28 March 1971 (age 55)
Medal record
Men's athletics
Representing Australia
World Championships
Silver medal – second place	1993 Toronto	200m
Silver medal – second place	1995 Gothenburg	4x100 m relay
Commonwealth Games
Silver medal – second place	1994 Victoria	4×100 m relay

Damien Marsh (born 28 March 1971) is a former Australian 100 metre and 200 metre sprint champion.

A native of Goondiwindi, Queensland, Marsh finest moment as a sprinter was winning the 1995 100 metre IAAF Grand Prix Final in Monaco in a time of 10.13, defeating a field of the world's top sprinters. This bettered his own Australian national record of 10.16 set in July 1994 in Oslo. He had broken Gerrard Keating's national record (of 10.22) in February 1993 in Melbourne with a time of 10.19. He also ran a personal best in the 200 in Monaco, 20.32.

Weeks earlier to running 10.13, Marsh led Australia to a silver medal in the 4X100m sprint relay in a national record time of 38.17 at the 1995 IAAF World Championships. Marsh narrowly missed out in reaching the 100m final with a 9th best 10.20 time in the event semi-finals. He finished 1995 ranked 9th in the world in the 200m. After suffering a ruptured achilles tendon injury during training for the 1996 Atlanta Olympics however, he never returned to such world-class form.

Marsh made the final of the 1993 World Championships 200m event (along with Dean Capobianco, coming 8th with a time of 20.56. He finished 5th in the 200m at the 1994 Goodwill Games with the same time. He won the Australian men's open athletics championships 100m event in 1994 and 1996 with times of 10.39 and 10.43, respectively. He was 1993 and 1998 200m champion as well with a wind-aided 20.29 and 21.34, respectively.

== Personal bests ==
- 100 metres – 10.13 (1995)
- 200 metres – 20.32 (1995)

that Australian 4 × 100 m record was actually set in the semi of the Gothenburg (IAAF world champs 1995) meet

== Sources ==
- Australian Broadcasting Corporation 2000 Olympics profile page
- www.gbrathletics.com
- Athletics Australia page with Marsh's career stats
- Northern Territory Athletics a page showing progression of the Australian national 100m record
