= Jean-Olivier Zirignon =

Ivorian sprinter

Personal information
- Born: 27 April 1971 (age 55) Abidjan, Ivory Coast

Sport
- Sport: Track and field
Medal record
Representing Ivory Coast
African Championships
Gold medal – first place	1998 Dakar	4×100 m
Silver medal – second place	1993 Durban	100 m
Bronze medal – third place	1990 Cairo	4×100 m

Jean-Olivier Zirignon (born 27 April 1971) is a Côte d'Ivoire (Ivory Coast) sprinter who specialized in the 100 metres. He finished seventh in 4 x 100 metres relay at the 1993 World Championships, together with teammates Ouattara Lagazane, Frank Waota and Ibrahim Meité.

On the individual level, Zirignon won a silver medal at the 1993 African Championships and a gold medal at the 1997 Jeux de la Francophonie, the latter in a personal best time of 10.07 seconds. This is the current national record.
