= Athletics at the 1991 Summer Universiade – Men's 100 metres =

The men's 100 metres event at the 1991 Summer Universiade was held at the Don Valley Stadium in Sheffield on 20 and 21 July 1991.

== Medalists ==
Gold	Silver	Bronze
Michael Bates; United States	Boris Goins; United States	Steve Gookey; Great Britain

== Results ==
=== Heats ===
Wind:
Heat 1: +1.2 m/s, Heat 2: +1.4 m/s, Heat 3: +1.8 m/s, Heat 4: +2.0 m/s, Heat 5: +2.3 m/s, Heat 6: +2.9 m/s, Heat 7: +2.4 m/s, Heat 8: +2.6 m/s, Heat 9: +0.5 m/s

Rank	Heat	Athlete	Nationality	Time	Notes
1	1	Horace Dove-Edwin	Sierra Leone	10.47	Q
2	1	Giorgio Marras	Italy	10.47	Q
3	1	Daniel Philip	Nigeria	10.50	Q
4	1	Aham Okeke	Norway	10.71	q
5	1	Afdiharto Mardi Lestari	Indonesia	10.84	
6	1	Masoud Mahroubi	Iran	11.33	
1	2	Sanusi Turay	Sierra Leone	10.32	Q
2	2	Steve Gookey	Great Britain	10.37	Q, PB
3	2	Geir Moen	Norway	10.56	Q
4	2	Massimiliano Catalano	Italy	10.64	q
5	2	Hyacinthe Kamelan	Ivory Coast	10.72	
6	2	Lam Wai Keung	Hong Kong	10.89	
7	2	Haidar Nur	Sudan	10.99	
1	3	Boris Goins	United States	10.34	Q
2	3	Patrick Stevens	Belgium	10.37	Q
3	3	Franck Zio	Burkina Faso	10.80	Q
3	3	Luís Cunha	Portugal	10.80	Q
5	3	Jean-Michel Nitharum	France	10.90	
6	3	Mario Sciberras	Malta	11.72	
1	4	Michael Green	Jamaica	10.44	Q
2	4	Sergio López	Spain	10.58	Q
3	4	Cengiz Kavaklıoğlu	Turkey	10.66	Q
4	4	Germain Ndzana	Cameroon	10.67	q
5	4	David Branle	Belgium	10.74	
6	4	Tobie Sepe	Central African Republic	11.05	
7	4	Nick Kasaine	Kenya	11.08	
1	5	Jean-Olivier Zirignon	Ivory Coast	10.46	Q
2	5	Courtney Rumbolt	Great Britain	10.56	Q
3	5	Mamadou Dione	Senegal	10.75	Q
4	5	Michael Ojok	Uganda	11.01	
5	5	Phillip Khaiseb	Namibia	11.03	
6	5	Dale Phillips	Guyana	11.10	
7	5	Bringle Kgabanyane	Botswana	11.37	
1	6	Michael Bates	United States	10.24	Q
2	6	Jin Sun-kuk	South Korea	10.41	Q
3	6	Jarosław Kaniecki	Poland	10.50	Q
4	6	Cameron Taylor	New Zealand	10.58	q
5	6	Luís Barroso	Portugal	10.61	q
1	7	Tatsuo Sugimoto	Japan	10.44	Q
2	7	Charles-Louis Seck	Senegal	10.65	Q
3	7	Ralph Blaauw	Namibia	10.98	Q
4	7	Robinson Stewart	Swaziland	11.05	
5	7	Nkello Ilokuli	Zaire	11.19	
6	7	Mohammad Abedi	Iran	11.22	
7	7	Yousuf Azeem	Maldives	11.38	
1	8	Wayne Watson	Jamaica	10.54	Q
2	8	Hsieh Tzong-tze	Chinese Taipei	10.62	Q
3	8	Pat Kwok Wai	Hong Kong	10.73	Q
4	8	Patrice Traoré Zeba	Burkina Faso	10.94	
5	8	Dalos Umul	Papua New Guinea	11.09	
6	8	Manuel Youness	Lebanon	11.36	
1	9	Jacek Marlicki	Poland	10.59	Q
2	9	Cornel Benz	Switzerland	10.73	Q
3	9	Tomohiro Osawa	Japan	10.76	Q
4	9	Tsen Hsiao-sheng	Chinese Taipei	10.79	
5	9	Moses Moruisi	Botswana	11.64	

=== Quarterfinals ===
Wind:
Heat 1: +2.6 m/s, Heat 2: +1.7 m/s, Heat 3: +3.9 m/s, Heat 4: +1.6 m/s

Rank	Heat	Athlete	Nationality	Time	Notes
1	4	Michael Bates	United States	10.24	Q
2	2	Boris Goins	United States	10.29	Q
3	3	Steve Gookey	Great Britain	10.33	Q
4	3	Tatsuo Sugimoto	Japan	10.34	Q
5	2	Patrick Stevens	Belgium	10.37	Q
6	1	Michael Green	Jamaica	10.38	Q
7	1	Horace Dove-Edwin	Sierra Leone	10.39	Q
8	2	Daniel Philip	Nigeria	10.41	Q
9	2	Jean-Olivier Zirignon	Ivory Coast	10.42	Q
9	4	Jacek Marlicki	Poland	10.42	Q
11	1	Jin Sun-kuk	South Korea	10.44	Q
12	1	Jarosław Kaniecki	Poland	10.47	Q
13	1	Geir Moen	Norway	10.47	
14	4	Charles-Louis Seck	Senegal	10.51	Q
15	1	Giorgio Marras	Italy	10.52	
15	2	Courtney Rumbolt	Great Britain	10.52	
17	3	Sergio López	Spain	10.54	Q
18	3	Massimiliano Catalano	Italy	10.56	Q
19	4	Aham Okeke	Norway	10.63	Q
20	4	Germain Ndzana	Cameroon	10.63	
21	4	Wayne Watson	Jamaica	10.65	
22	2	Cengiz Kavaklıoğlu	Turkey	10.68	
22	4	Tomohiro Osawa	Japan	10.68	
22	4	Hsieh Tzong-tze	Chinese Taipei	10.68	
25	4	Cornel Benz	Switzerland	10.69	
26	2	Luís Barroso	Portugal	10.70	
27	3	Mamadou Dione	Senegal	10.71	
28	3	Luís Cunha	Portugal	10.75	
29	2	Franck Zio	Burkina Faso	10.80	
30	3	Pat Kwok Wai	Hong Kong	10.84	
31	1	Cameron Taylor	New Zealand	14.04	
	1	Ralph Blaauw	Namibia	?	
	3	Sanusi Turay	Sierra Leone	DQ	FS

=== Semifinals ===
Wind:
Heat 1: +1.0 m/s, Heat 2: +0.8 m/s

Rank	Heat	Athlete	Nationality	Time	Notes
1	2	Michael Bates	United States	10.22	Q
2	1	Boris Goins	United States	10.36	Q
3	2	Michael Green	Jamaica	10.37	Q
4	2	Jacek Marlicki	Poland	10.39	Q
5	1	Steve Gookey	Great Britain	10.41	Q
6	1	Patrick Stevens	Belgium	10.44	Q
6	2	Daniel Philip	Nigeria	10.44	Q
8	1	Horace Dove-Edwin	Sierra Leone	10.46	Q
9	2	Jean-Olivier Zirignon	Ivory Coast	10.52	
10	2	Tatsuo Sugimoto	Japan	10.56	
11	1	Jarosław Kaniecki	Poland	10.58	
11	1	Jin Sun-kuk	South Korea	10.58	
11	2	Sergio López	Spain	10.58	
14	1	Charles-Louis Seck	Senegal	10.61	
15	2	Aham Okeke	Norway	10.75	
16	1	Massimiliano Catalano	Italy	10.84	

=== Final ===
Wind: 0.0 m/s

Rank	Athlete	Nationality	Time	Notes
1st place, gold medalist(s)	Michael Bates	United States	10.17	
2nd place, silver medalist(s)	Boris Goins	United States	10.34	
3rd place, bronze medalist(s)	Steve Gookey	Great Britain	10.39	
4	Jacek Marlicki	Poland	10.39	
5	Patrick Stevens	Belgium	10.40	
6	Horace Dove-Edwin	Sierra Leone	10.44	
7	Michael Green	Jamaica	10.44	
8	Daniel Philips	Nigeria	10.46	
