= Athletics at the 1991 Summer Universiade – Men's 4 × 100 metres relay =

The men's 4 × 100 metres relay event at the 1991 Summer Universiade was held at the Don Valley Stadium in Sheffield on 24 and 25 July 1991.

== Results ==
=== Heats ===
| Rank | Heat | Nation | Athletes | Time | Notes |
|---|---|---|---|---|---|
| 1 | 2 | United States | Michael Bates, Derwin Hall, Jon Drummond, Boris Goins | 39.27 | Q |
| 2 | 2 | Sierra Leone | Josephus Thomas, Benjamin Grant, Joselyn Thomas, Sanusi Turay | 39.80 | Q |
| 3 | 2 | Ivory Coast | Jean-Olivier Zirignon, Paul Bouabré, Gilles Bogui, Franck Waota | 39.89 | Q |
| 4 | 1 | Jamaica | Patrick O'Connor, Linval Laird, Wayne Watson, Evon Clarke | 40.01 | Q |
| 5 | 2 | Italy | Paolo Catalano, Roberto Tirino, Giorgio Marras, Giancarlo Tilli | 40.11 | q |
| 6 | 2 | Senegal | Mamadou Dione, Charles-Louis Seck, Joseph Dias, Lamine Samatey | 40.18 | q |
| 7 | 2 | Great Britain | Steve Gookey, Courtney Rumbolt, Philip Harries, Jamie Henderson | 40.22 | |
| 8 | 1 | Belgium | Jeroen Fischer, Patrick Stevens, David Branle, Stefaan Allemeersch | 40.45 | Q |
| 9 | 1 | Chinese Taipei | Chao Chih-kuo, Tsai Yi-cheng, Hsieh Tzong-tze, Tseng Hsiao-sheng | 40.51 | Q |
| 10 | 1 | Japan | Masaki Sumitani, Tomohiro Osawa, Hisanobu Konae, Yoshiyuki Okuyama | 40.69 | |
| 11 | 1 | Ghana | Eugene Koranteng, Nelson Boateng, Timothy Hesse, John Myles-Mills | 41.69 | |
| 12 | 1 | Iran | Mohammad Ali Karimi, Masoud Mahroubi, Mohammad Abedi, Hamid Sajjadi | 43.91 | |
| | 1 | France | Jean Massif, Laurent Leconte, Laurent Nevo, Pascal Irdor | DNF | |

=== Final ===
| Rank | Nation | Athletes | Time | Notes |
|---|---|---|---|---|
| 1st place, gold medalist(s) | United States | Jon Drummond, Boris Goins, Michael Bates, James Trapp | 39.10 | |
| 2nd place, silver medalist(s) | Sierra Leone | Joselyn Thomas, Horace Dove-Edwin, Benjamin Grant, Sanusi Turay | 39.88 | |
| 3rd place, bronze medalist(s) | Belgium | David Branle, Jeroen Fischer, Stefaan Allemeersch, Patrick Stevens | 40.05 | |
| 4 | Ivory Coast | Hyacinthe Kamelan, Franck Waota, Gilles Bogui, Jean-Olivier Zirignon | 40.14 | |
| 5 | Jamaica | Michael Green, Patrick O'Connor, Wayne Watson, Howard Davis | 40.50 | |
| 6 | Chinese Taipei | Hsieh Tzong-tze, Tsai Yi-cheng, Chao Chih-kuo, Tseng Hsiao-sheng | 40.54 | |
| 7 | Senegal | Lamine Samatey, Mamadou Dione, Charles-Louis Seck, Joseph Dias | 40.75 | |
| 8 | Italy | Giorgio Marras, Roberto Tirino, Paolo Catalano, Giancarlo Tilli | 41.14 | |
