= Athletics at the 1991 Summer Universiade – Men's 400 metres =

The men's 400 metres event at the 1991 Summer Universiade was held at the Don Valley Stadium in Sheffield on 20, 21 and 22 July 1991.

== Medalists ==
Gold	Silver	Bronze
Patrick O'Connor; Jamaica	Benyounés Lahlou; Morocco	Marlin Cannon; United States

== Results ==
=== Heats ===
Held on 20 July

Rank	Heat	Athlete	Nationality	Time	Notes
1	7	Benyounés Lahlou	Morocco	46.89	Q
2	2	Shunji Karube	Japan	47.16	Q
3	2	Evon Clarke	Jamaica	47.27	Q
4	4	Tim Hesse	Ghana	47.44	Q
5	1	Gabriel Luke	United States	47.45	Q
6	3	Michael Joubert	Australia	47.50	Q
7	7	Elieser Wettebosi	Indonesia	47.63	Q
7	8	Patrick O'Connor	Jamaica	47.63	Q
9	1	Calvin Henry	Great Britain	47.69	Q
10	7	Masayoshi Kan	Japan	47.72	Q
11	4	Du'aine Ladejo	Great Britain	47.74	Q
12	8	Laurent Lebras	France	47.75	Q
13	6	Marlin Cannon	United States	47.83	Q
14	7	Miguel Cuesta	Spain	48.02	q
15	8	Son Jul-il	South Korea	48.04	Q
16	6	Riccardo Cardone	Italy	48.09	Q
17	6	Joslyn Thomas	Sierra Leone	48.13	Q
18	4	Thomas Koech	Kenya	48.18	Q
19	6	Vladimir Popov	Soviet Union	48.33	q
20	3	Dmitriy Kliger	Soviet Union	48.36	Q
21	2	Jens Storhaug	Norway	48.47	Q
22	5	Camera Ntereke	Botswana	48.61	Q
23	8	Agustín Tello	Spain	48.64	q
24	3	Christian Boda	Mauritius	48.75	Q
25	1	Gianrico Boncompagni	Italy	48.82	Q
26	2	Nuno Alpiarça	Portugal	49.00	q
27	6	Moustapha Diarra	Senegal	49.15	q
28	5	Ivaylo Vasilev	Bulgaria	49.17	Q
29	1	Marius Rooth	Norway	49.38	q
30	3	Mohamed Mehdi Hasan	Bangladesh	49.39	q
31	3	Ali Faudet	Chad	49.57	q
32	4	Manlio Molinari	San Marino	49.85	
33	5	Eliud Moreno	Kenya	50.09	Q
34	2	Ralph Blaauw	Namibia	50.43	
34	4	Dhani Ram Chaudhari	Nepal	50.43	
36	8	Bothloke Shebe	Lesotho	50.60	
37	6	Dalos Umul	Uganda	50.62	
38	7	Hau Yiu Chung	Hong Kong	50.64	
39	8	Max Thenu	Indonesia	50.87	
40	3	Carlos Madrigal	Costa Rica	51.73	
41	4	Mordsen Ruveve	Zambia	51.88	
42	7	Bringle Kgabanyane	Botswana	52.50	
43	8	Erasmus Nyanga	Zambia	52.70	
44	3	Mahamadou Issoufou	Niger	53.79	
45	2	Timothy Leone	Malta	54.40	
46	3	Faha Sy	Mauritania	54.44	
47	5	Kabir Lutful	Bangladesh	54.72	
48	5	Ralph Mifsud	Malta	56.13	
49	5	S. Sopaseuth	Laos	57.36	
50	1	Mohamed Ould Brahim	Mauritania	1:05.09	

=== Quarterfinals ===
Held on 20 July

Rank	Heat	Athlete	Nationality	Time	Notes
1	4	Evon Clarke	Jamaica	47.00	Q
2	3	Tim Hesse	Ghana	47.06	Q
2	4	Benyounés Lahlou	Morocco	47.06	Q
4	3	Patrick O'Connor	Jamaica	47.10	Q
5	2	Gabriel Luke	United States	47.12	Q
6	2	Michael Joubert	Australia	47.17	Q
7	1	Dmitriy Kliger	Soviet Union	47.19	Q
8	4	Ivaylo Vasilev	Bulgaria	47.22	Q
9	3	Calvin Henry	Great Britain	47.29	Q
10	3	Riccardo Cardone	Italy	47.36	Q
11	4	Masayoshi Kan	Japan	47.56	Q
12	1	Shunji Karube	Japan	47.61	Q
13	1	Marlin Cannon	United States	47.67	Q
13	2	Laurent Lebras	France	47.67	Q
15	2	Du'aine Ladejo	Great Britain	47.73	Q
16	4	Miguel Cuesta	Spain	47.95	
17	3	Christian Boda	Mauritius	48.23	
18	2	Vladimir Popov	Soviet Union	48.33	
19	4	Camera Ntereke	Botswana	48.38	
20	3	Agustín Tello	Spain	48.39	
21	1	Gianrico Boncompagni	Italy	48.40	Q
21	3	Joslyn Thomas	Sierra Leone	48.40	
23	2	Thomas Koech	Kenya	48.50	
24	1	Jens Storhaug	Norway	48.55	
25	3	Marius Rooth	Norway	48.58	
26	4	Eliud Moreno	Kenya	48.59	
27	2	Nuño Alpiarça	Portugal	49.36	
	?	Mohamed Mehdi Hasan	Bangladesh	?	
	?	Ali Faudet	Chad	?	
	?	Elieser Wettebosi	Indonesia	?	
	?	Moustapha Diarra	Senegal	?	
	?	Son Jul-il	South Korea	?	

=== Semifinals ===
Held on 21 July

Rank	Heat	Athlete	Nationality	Time	Notes
1	2	Gabriel Luke	United States	45.98	Q
2	1	Dmitriy Kliger	Soviet Union	46.11	Q
3	1	Marlin Cannon	United States	46.12	Q
4	2	Patrick O'Connor	Jamaica	46.18	Q
5	1	Benyounés Lahlou	Morocco	46.23	Q
6	2	Michael Joubert	Australia	46.37	Q
7	2	Calvin Henry	Great Britain	46.60	Q
8	1	Shunji Karube	Japan	46.62	Q
9	2	Tim Hesse	Ghana	46.66	
10	1	Evon Clarke	Jamaica	46.68	
11	1	Ivaylo Vasilev	Bulgaria	46.92	
12	2	Riccardo Cardone	Italy	46.99	
13	2	Laurent Lebras	France	47.29	
14	2	Masayoshi Kan	Japan	47.34	
15	1	Du'aine Ladejo	Great Britain	47.63	
16	1	Gianrico Boncompagni	Italy	48.44	

=== Final ===
Held on 22 July

Rank	Athlete	Nationality	Time	Notes
1st place, gold medalist(s)	Patrick O'Connor	Jamaica	45.52	
2nd place, silver medalist(s)	Benyounés Lahlou	Morocco	45.55	PB
3rd place, bronze medalist(s)	Marlin Cannon	United States	45.78	
4	Dmitriy Kliger	Soviet Union	46.24	
5	Shunji Karube	Japan	46.49	
6	Calvin Henry	Great Britain	46.51	
	Gabriel Luke	United States	DQ	
	Michael Joubert	Australia	DQ	
