= Athletics at the 1992 Summer Olympics – Men's 200 metres =

Men's 200 metres at the Games of the XXV Olympiad
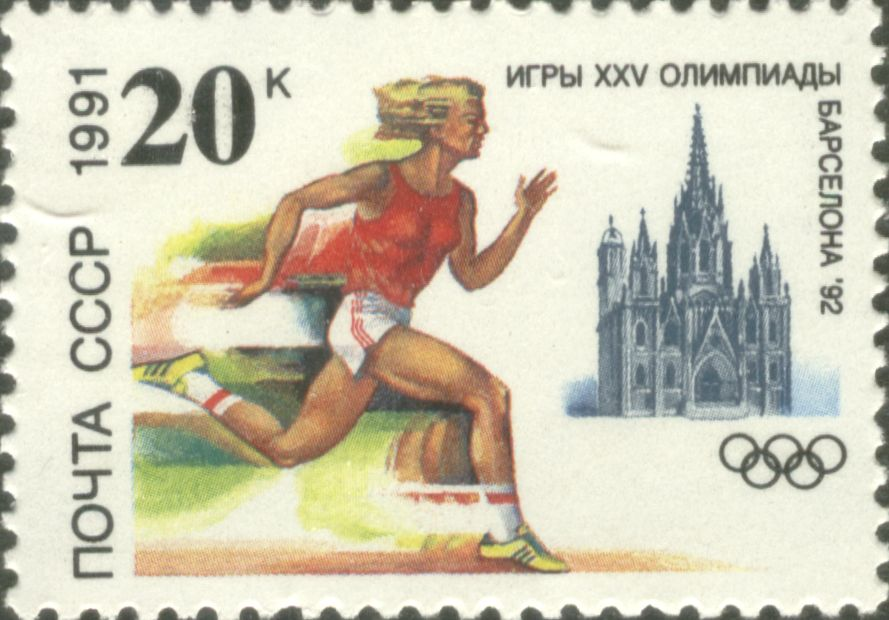
- Soviet stamp commemorating 1992 Olympic athletics
- Venue: Estadi Olímpic Lluís Companys
- Dates: August 3–6
- Competitors: 79 from 65 nations
- Winning time: 20.01

Medalists
1st place, gold medalist(s)		Michael Marsh; United States
2nd place, silver medalist(s)		Frankie Fredericks; Namibia
3rd place, bronze medalist(s)		Michael Bates; United States

The men's 200 metres was an event at the 1992 Summer Olympics in Barcelona, Spain. There were 79 participating athletes from 65 nations, with eleven qualifying heats. The maximum number of athletes per nation had been set at 3 since the 1930 Olympic Congress. The event was won by 0.12 seconds by Michael Marsh of the United States, the nation's third consecutive and 15th overall victory in the event. The Americans would take a second medal for the third consecutive Games as well, this time with Michael Bates earning bronze. The silver medal went to Frankie Fredericks, taking Namibia's first medal in the men's 200 metres.

== Background ==
This was the 21st appearance of the event, which was not held at the first Olympics in 1896 but has been on the program ever since. Four of the eight finalists from the 1988 Games returned: bronze medalist Robson da Silva of Brazil, fourth-place finisher Linford Christie of Great Britain, fifth-place finisher Atlee Mahorn of Canada, and sixth-place finisher Gilles Quénéhervé of France. Michael Johnson was the favorite coming into the Games; he had won the 1991 World Championship and was ranked #1 in the world in 1990 and 1991. He had been beaten in June by Frankie Fredericks of Namibia, however, and teammate Michael Marsh had been only 0.07 seconds behind Johnson at the U.S. trials. Before the Games, Johnson came down with food poisoning; while he still competed, he was clearly not at full strength.

Bahrain, the Central African Republic, Cyprus, Grenada, Mauritania, Namibia, Niger, San Marino, and Togo each made their debut in the event. Some former Soviet republics competed as the Unified Team. One Yugoslav athlete competed as an Independent Olympic Participant. The United States made its 20th appearance, most of any nation, having missed only the boycotted 1980 Games.

== Competition format ==
The competition used the four round format introduced in 1920: heats, quarterfinals, semifinals, and a final. The "fastest loser" system introduced in 1960 was used in the heats and quarterfinals.

There were 11 heats of 7 or 8 runners each, with the top 3 men in each advancing to the quarterfinals along with the next 7 fastest overall. The quarterfinals consisted of 5 heats of 8 athletes each; the 3 fastest men in each heat and the next fastest overall advanced to the semifinals. There were 2 semifinals, each with 8 runners. The top 4 athletes in each semifinal advanced. The final had 8 runners. The races were run on a 400 metre track.

== Records ==
These were the standing world and Olympic records (in seconds) prior to the 1992 Summer Olympics.

World record	Pietro Mennea (ITA)	19.72	Mexico City, Mexico	12 September 1979
Olympic record	Joe DeLoach (USA)	19.75	Seoul, South Korea	28 September 1988

Michael Marsh set a new Olympic and North American record with 19.73 seconds in his semi‑final. It was also a sea‑level record.

== Schedule ==
The schedule featured three days of competition for the first time since 1908, up from two days in previous Games, with the semifinals and final on separate days.

All times are Central European Summer Time (UTC+2)

Date	Time	Round
Monday, 3 August 1992	10:20; 18:20	Heats; Quarterfinals
Wednesday, 5 August 1992	18:30	Semifinals
Thursday, 6 August 1992	18:40	Final

== Results ==
=== Heats ===
==== Heat 1 ====
Rank	Athlete	Nation	Time	Notes
1	Frankie Fredericks	Namibia	20.74	Q
2	Andreas Berger	Austria	21.02	Q
3	Edgardo Guilbe	Puerto Rico	21.75	Q
4	Wyndell Dickinson	Virgin Islands	21.78	
5	Bothloko Shebe	Lesotho	21.96	
6	Apisai Driu Baibai	Fiji	22.07	
7	Médard Makanga	Republic of the Congo	22.18	

==== Heat 2 ====
Rank	Athlete	Nation	Time	Notes
1	Michael Johnson	United States	20.80	Q
2	Patrick Stevens	Belgium	20.93	Q
3	Sérgio de Menezes	Brazil	21.17	Q
4	Francis Ogola	Uganda	21.29	q
5	Miguel Ángel Gómez	Spain	21.46	q
6	Samuel Nchinda-Kaya	Cameroon	21.50	
7	Sriyantha Dissanayake	Sri Lanka	21.61	

==== Heat 3 ====
Rank	Athlete	Nation	Time	Notes
1	Oluyemi Kayode	Nigeria	20.42	Q
2	Atlee Mahorn	Canada	21.01	Q
3	Boevi Lawson	Togo	21.05	Q
4	Ouattara Lagazane	Ivory Coast	21.13	q
5	Simon Kipkemboi	Kenya	21.57	
6	Dejan Jovković	Independent Olympic Participants	21.77	
7	Amadou Sy Savané	Guinea	21.86	
8	Jaime Zelaya	Honduras	22.05	

==== Heat 4 ====
Quénéhervé was originally disqualified, putting Seaksarn Boonrat in third place and qualifying the Thai runner for the quarterfinals. When Quénéhervé was reinstated, both men advanced on placement (Seaksarn Boonrat would have advanced on time, but this resulted in him not using one of the "lucky loser" places).

Rank	Athlete	Nation	Time	Notes
1	Michael Bates	United States	20.91	Q
2	Gilles Quénéhervé	France	20.99	Q
3	Kennedy Ondiek	Kenya	21.04	Q
4	Seaksarn Boonrat	Thailand	21.39	Q
5	Eswort Coombs	Saint Vincent and the Grenadines	22.07	
6	Bounhom Siliphone	Laos	23.64	
—	Afonso Ferraz	Angola	DNS	

==== Heat 5 ====
Rank	Athlete	Nation	Time	Notes
1	Daniel Cojocaru	Romania	21.20	Q
2	Linford Christie	Great Britain	21.23	Q
3	Stefan Burkart	Switzerland	21.33	Q
4	Abel Tshaka Nzimande	South Africa	21.43	q
5	Mateaki Mafi	Tonga	22.05	
6	Lamin Marikong	The Gambia	22.33	
7	Randolph Foster	Costa Rica	22.47	
8	Abdullah Salem Al-Khalidi	Oman	22.48	

==== Heat 6 ====
Rank	Athlete	Nation	Time	Notes
1	Marcus Adam	Great Britain	20.62	Q
2	Nikolay Antonov	Bulgaria	20.94	Q
3	Nelson Boateng	Ghana	21.03	Q
4	Henrico Atkins	Barbados	21.28	q
5	Ato Boldon	Trinidad and Tobago	21.65	
6	Shahanuddin Choudhury	Bangladesh	21.88	
7	Kaminiel Selot	Papua New Guinea	22.36	
8	Boureima Kimba	Niger	22.49	

==== Heat 7 ====
Rank	Athlete	Nation	Time	Notes
1	Olapade Adeniken	Nigeria	20.79	Q
2	Clive Wright	Jamaica	20.98	Q
3	Edvin Ivanov	Unified Team	21.10	Q
4	Giannis Zisimidis	Cyprus	21.51	
5	Aldo Canti	San Marino	21.69	
6	Gabriel Simeon	Grenada	22.09	
7	Kenmore Hughes	Antigua and Barbuda	22.18	

==== Heat 8 ====
Rank	Athlete	Nation	Time	Notes
1	Dean Capobianco	Australia	20.86	Q
2	Torbjörn Eriksson	Sweden	21.08	Q
3	Ibrahima Tamba	Senegal	21.25	Q
4	Sayed Mubarak Al-Kuwari	Qatar	21.87	
5	Adam Hassan Sakak	Sudan	21.96	
6	Robinson Stewart	Swaziland	21.97	
—	Jean-Charles Trouabal	France	DNF	
—	Juan Vicente Matala	Equatorial Guinea	DSQ	

==== Heat 9 ====
Rank	Athlete	Nation	Time	Notes
1	John Regis	Great Britain	20.63	Q
2	Sidnei de Souza	Brazil	20.72	Q
3	Emmanuel Tuffour	Ghana	21.07	Q
4	Horace Dove-Edwin	Sierra Leone	21.38	q
5	Khaled Ibrahim Jouma	Bahrain	21.55	
6	Harouna Pale	Burkina Faso	21.65	
7	Boubout Dieng	Mauritania	22.75	

==== Heat 10 ====
Rank	Athlete	Nation	Time	Notes
1	Mike Marsh	United States	20.38	Q
2	Neil De Silva	Trinidad and Tobago	20.89	Q
3	Peter Ogilvie	Canada	21.11	Q
4	Ousmane Diarra	Mali	21.73	
5	Hussain Arif	Pakistan	21.75	
6	Pat Kwok Wai	Hong Kong	22.45	
7	Ahmed Shageef	Maldives	22.54	

==== Heat 11 ====
Rank	Athlete	Nation	Time	Notes
1	Robson da Silva	Brazil	20.62	Q
2	Cameron Taylor	New Zealand	20.91	Q
3	Christoph Pöstinger	Austria	21.02	Q
4	Anthony Wilson	Canada	21.21	q
5	Valentin Ngbogo	Central African Republic	21.51	
6	Claude Roumain	Haiti	22.51	
—	Fletcher Wamilee	Vanuatu	DNS	

=== Quarterfinals ===
==== Quarterfinal 1 ====
Rank	Athlete	Nation	Time	Notes
1	Marcus Adam	Great Britain	20.43	Q
2	Michael Johnson	United States	20.55	Q
3	Neil de Silva	Trinidad and Tobago	20.66	Q
4	Atlee Mahorn	Canada	20.78	
5	Christoph Pöstinger	Austria	20.83	
6	Sergio de Menezes	Brazil	21.00	
7	Horace Dove-Edwin	Sierra Leone	21.80	
—	Eduardo Guilbe Alomar	Puerto Rico	DNS	

==== Quarterfinal 2 ====
Rank	Athlete	Nation	Time	Notes
1	Robson da Silva	Brazil	20.35	Q
2	Olapade Adeniken	Nigeria	20.47	Q
3	Clive Wright	Jamaica	20.70	Q
4	Edvin Ivanov	Unified Team	20.78	
5	Cameron Taylor	New Zealand	20.83	
6	Samuel Nelson Boateng	Ghana	21.04	
7	Ouattara Lagazane	Ivory Coast	21.39	
8	Francis Ogola	Uganda	21.41	

==== Quarterfinal 3 ====
Rank	Athlete	Nation	Time	Notes
1	Michael Bates	United States	20.22	Q
2	Oluyemi Kayode	Nigeria	20.22	Q
3	Linford Christie	Great Britain	20.52	Q
4	Dean Capobianco	Australia	20.61	
5	Peter Ogilvie	Canada	20.77	
6	Andreas Berger	Austria	21.02	
7	Seksarn Boon Rat	Thailand	21.30	
—	Tshakile Nzimande	South Africa	DNS	

==== Quarterfinal 4 ====
Rank	Athlete	Nation	Time	Notes
1	Michael Marsh	United States	20.08	Q
2	Sidney Telles	Brazil	20.69	Q
3	Torbjörn Eriksson	Sweden	20.81	Q
4	Kennedy Ondieki	Kenya	20.86	
5	Gilles Quénéhervé	France	20.96	
6	Daniel Cojocaru	Romania	20.96	
7	Ibrahim Tamba	Senegal	21.28	
8	Miguel Ángel Gómez	Spain	21.32	
9	Stefan Burkart	Switzerland	21.52	

==== Quarterfinal 5 ====
Rank	Athlete	Nation	Time	Notes
1	Frankie Fredericks	Namibia	20.02	Q
2	John Regis	Great Britain	20.16	Q
3	Nikolay Antonov	Bulgaria	20.50	Q
4	Emmanuel Tuffour	Ghana	20.58	q
5	Patrick Stevens	Belgium	20.67	
6	Henrico Atkins	Barbados	21.19	
7	Anthony Wilson	Canada	21.22	
8	Boevi Youlou Lawson	Togo	21.47	

=== Semifinals ===
==== Semifinal 1 ====
Rank	Athlete	Nation	Time	Notes
1	Michael Marsh	United States	19.73	Q, OR
2	John Regis	Great Britain	20.09	Q
3	Robson da Silva	Brazil	20.15	Q
4	Oluyemi Kayode	Nigeria	20.23	Q
5	Linford Christie	Great Britain	20.38	
6	Nikolay Antonov	Bulgaria	20.55	
7	Clive Wright	Jamaica	20.82	
8	Torbjörn Eriksson	Sweden	20.85	

==== Semifinal 2 ====
Rank	Athlete	Nation	Time	Notes
1	Frankie Fredericks	Namibia	20.14	Q
2	Michael Bates	United States	20.39	Q
3	Olapade Adeniken	Nigeria	20.39	Q
4	Marcus Adam	Great Britain	20.63	Q
5	Emmanuel Tuffour	Ghana	20.78	
6	Michael Johnson	United States	20.78	
7	Sidney Telles	Brazil	20.88	
—	Neil de Silva	Trinidad and Tobago	DSQ	

=== Final ===
Held on August 6, 1992.

Rank	Athlete	Nation	Time
1st place, gold medalist(s)	Michael Marsh	United States	20.01
2nd place, silver medalist(s)	Frankie Fredericks	Namibia	20.13
3rd place, bronze medalist(s)	Michael Bates	United States	20.38
4	Robson da Silva	Brazil	20.45
5	Olapade Adeniken	Nigeria	20.50
6	John Regis	Great Britain	20.55
7	Oluyemi Kayode	Nigeria	20.67
8	Marcus Adam	Great Britain	20.80

== See also ==
- 1988 Men's Olympic Games 200 metres (Seoul)
- 1990 Men's European Championships 200 metres (Split)
- 1991 Men's World Championships 200 metres (Tokyo)
- 1993 Men's World Championships 200 metres (Stuttgart)
- 1994 Men's European Championships 200 metres (Helsinki)
- 1995 Men's World Championships 200 metres (Gothenburg)
- 1996 Men's Olympic Games 200 metres (Atlanta)
