= Athletics at the 1991 Summer Universiade – Men's 200 metres =

The men's 200 metres event at the 1991 Summer Universiade was held at the Don Valley Stadium in Sheffield on 23 and 24 July 1991.

== Medalists ==
Gold	Silver	Bronze
Jon Drummond; United States	Daniel Phillip; Nigeria	Patrick Stevens; Belgium

== Results ==
=== Heats ===
Wind:
Heat 1: +0.9 m/s, Heat 2: +0.5 m/s, Heat 3: +1.4 m/s, Heat 4: +0.4 m/s, Heat 5: +1.3 m/s, Heat 6: +1.3 m/s, Heat 7: +1.6 m/s

Rank	Heat	Athlete	Nationality	Time	Notes
1	2	Daniel Phillip	Nigeria	20.86	Q
2	2	Patrick Stevens	Belgium	20.89	Q
3	4	Jon Drummond	United States	21.09	Q
4	3	Geir Moen	Norway	21.15	Q
5	6	Hideyaki Miyata	Japan	21.23	Q
6	1	Yoshiyuki Okuyama	Japan	21.27	Q
7	4	Cameron Taylor	New Zealand	21.36	Q
8	2	Solomon Wariso	Great Britain	21.43	Q
9	6	Joseph Dias	Senegal	21.55	Q
9	7	James Jett	United States	21.55	Q
11	7	Jeroen Fischer	Belgium	21.58	Q
12	5	Giancarlo Tilli	Italy	21.59	Q
13	3	Aboubakry Dia	Senegal	21.60	Q
13	3	Luís Barroso	Portugal	21.60	Q
13	4	Roberto Tirino	Italy	21.60	Q
16	2	Germain Ndzana	Cameroon	21.63	Q
17	3	Andrey Fedoriv	Soviet Union	21.68	Q
18	5	Aleksey Petukhov	Soviet Union	21.72	Q
19	1	John Myles-Mills	Ghana	21.75	Q
20	1	Philip Harries	Great Britain	21.80	Q
20	4	Luís Cunha	Portugal	21.80	Q
22	1	Christian Boda	Mauritius	21.82	Q
23	1	Hsieh Tzong-tze	Chinese Taipei	21.88	q
23	6	Tsai Yi-cheng	Chinese Taipei	21.88	Q
25	4	Carlos del Piñal	Spain	21.98	q
26	1	James Mutua	Kenya	22.00	q
27	3	Mohamed Fachri	Indonesia	22.08	q
28	1	Robinson Stewart	Swaziland	22.25	
28	5	Camera Ntereke	Botswana	22.25	Q
30	3	Mehdi Hasan	Bangladesh	22.28	
31	4	Nkello Ilokuli	Zaire	22.32	
32	7	Bothloke Shebe	Lesotho	22.37	Q
33	5	Andrew Barrie	Sierra Leone	22.52	Q
34	1	Michael Ojok	Uganda	22.55	
34	2	Dalos Umul	Papua New Guinea	22.55	
36	7	Phillip Khaiseb	Namibia	22.56	Q
37	6	Hau Yiu Chung	Hong Kong	22.74	Q
38	6	Dale Phillips	Guyana	22.86	
39	4	Yousuf Azeem	Maldives	23.15	
40	7	Moses Moruisi	Botswana	23.38	
41	2	Mackovie Mbewe	Malawi	23.44	
42	7	Leslie Koroma	Sierra Leone	23.49	
43	5	Mordsen Ruveve	Zambia	23.91	
44	6	Ralph Mifsud	Malta	24.47	
45	3	Oumar Nyemba	Zaire	24.49	
46	4	Mario Sciberras	Malta	24.89	

=== Quarterfinals ===
Wind:
Heat 1: +2.3 m/s, Heat 2: +1.8 m/s, Heat 3: +1.6 m/s, Heat 4: +2.6 m/s

Rank	Heat	Athlete	Nationality	Time	Notes
1	3	Daniel Phillip	Nigeria	20.75	Q
2	4	Hideyaki Miyata	Japan	20.91	Q
3	1	Jon Drummond	United States	21.04	Q
4	3	Patrick Stevens	Belgium	21.10	Q
5	2	Geir Moen	Norway	21.11	Q
6	4	James Jett	United States	21.16	Q
7	4	Jeroen Fischer	Belgium	21.17	Q
8	3	Cameron Taylor	New Zealand	21.21	Q
9	2	Yoshiyuki Okuyama	Japan	21.23	Q
10	1	Solomon Wariso	Great Britain	21.37	Q
11	4	John Myles-Mills	Ghana	21.45	Q
12	4	Germain Ndzana	Cameroon	21.45	
13	2	Aleksey Petukhov	Soviet Union	21.46	Q
14	3	Roberto Tirino	Italy	21.56	Q
15	1	Giancarlo Tilli	Italy	21.60	Q
16	1	Andrey Fedoriv	Soviet Union	21.61	Q
17	3	Luís Barroso	Portugal	21.61	
18	2	Aboubakry Dia	Senegal	21.62	Q
19	4	Tsai Yi-cheng	Chinese Taipei	21.87	
20	3	Philip Harries	Great Britain	21.91	
21	4	Carlos del Piñal	Spain	21.92	
22	1	Luís Cunha	Portugal	21.98	
23	2	Hsieh Tzong-tze	Chinese Taipei	22.04	
24	3	Christian Boda	Mauritius	22.15	
25	2	Bothloke Shebe	Lesotho	22.26	
26	2	Camera Ntereke	Botswana	22.28	
27	1	James Mutua	Kenya	22.29	
28	4	Phillip Khaiseb	Namibia	22.65	
29	1	Andrew Barrie	Sierra Leone	22.74	
	?	Hau Yiu Chung	Hong Kong	?	
	?	Mohamed Fachri	Indonesia	?	
	?	Joseph Dias	Senegal	?	

=== Semifinals ===
Wind:
Heat 1: +2.0 m/s, Heat 2: +2.3 m/s

Rank	Heat	Athlete	Nationality	Time	Notes
1	2	Jon Drummond	United States	20.58	Q
2	1	Daniel Phillip	Nigeria	20.79	Q
3	2	Patrick Stevens	Belgium	20.95	Q
4	2	Geir Moen	Norway	20.95	Q
5	2	Yoshiyuki Okuyama	Japan	21.01	Q
6	1	James Jett	United States	21.09	Q
7	1	Solomon Wariso	Great Britain	21.14	Q
7	2	Cameron Taylor	New Zealand	21.14	
9	1	Jeroen Fischer	Belgium	21.17	Q
10	1	Hideyaki Miyata	Japan	21.21	
11	1	Andrey Fedoriv	Soviet Union	21.56	
12	2	Aleksey Petukhov	Soviet Union	21.57	
13	2	Roberto Tirino	Italy	21.57	
14	1	Aboubakry Dia	Senegal	21.64	
15	1	Giancarlo Tilli	Italy	21.73	
16	2	John Myles-Mills	Ghana	24.49	

=== Final ===
Wind: +1.0 m/s

Rank	Athlete	Nationality	Time	Notes
1st place, gold medalist(s)	Jon Drummond	United States	20.58	
2nd place, silver medalist(s)	Daniel Phillip	Nigeria	20.69	
3rd place, bronze medalist(s)	Patrick Stevens	Belgium	20.99	
4	Geir Moen	Norway	21.11	
5	Yoshiyuki Okuyama	Japan	21.13	
6	James Jett	United States	21.19	
7	Jeroen Fischer	Belgium	21.30	
8	Solomon Wariso	Great Britain	21.70	
