= Athletics at the 1991 Summer Universiade – Men's 4 × 400 metres relay =

The men's 4 × 400 metres relay event at the 1991 Summer Universiade was held at the Don Valley Stadium in Sheffield on 24 and 25 July 1991.

== Results ==
=== Heats ===
| Rank | Heat | Nation | Athletes | Time | Notes |
|---|---|---|---|---|---|
| 1 | 1 | United States | Larry Gardner, Marlin Cannon, Gabriel Luke, Brian Irvin | 3:04.43 | Q |
| 2 | 1 | Jamaica | Evon Clarke, Patrick O'Connor, Howard Davis, Wayne Watson | 3:05.84 | Q |
| 3 | 1 | Japan | Yoshiyuki Okuyama, Kazuhiko Yamazaki, Shunji Karube, Yoshihiko Saito | 3:08.11 | q |
| 4 | 1 | Great Britain | James Stevenson, Paul Dennis, Du'aine Ladejo, Calvin Henry | 3:08.33 | q |
| 5 | 2 | Italy | Giorgio Frinolli, Gianrico Boncompagni, Riccardo Cardone, Vito Petrella | 3:09.36 | Q |
| 6 | 2 | Soviet Union | Aleksey Petukhov, Dmitriy Kliger, Vladimir Popov, Oleg Tverdokhleb | 3:10.49 | Q |
| 7 | 2 | Spain | Miguel Cuesta, Andrés Vaquero, Antonio Novo, Agustín Tello | 3:11.88 | q |
| 8 | 2 | Norway | Kenneth Nielsen, Marius Rooth, Eirik Madsen, Jens Storhaug | 3:11.96 | q |
| 9 | 2 | Mauritius | Gino Antoine, Gilbert Hashan, Christian Boda, Judex Lefou | 3:13.99 | |

=== Final ===
| Rank | Nation | Athletes | Time | Notes |
|---|---|---|---|---|
| 1st place, gold medalist(s) | United States | Chuck Wilson, Marlin Cannon, Brian Irvin, Gabriel Luke | 3:03.65 | |
| 2nd place, silver medalist(s) | Jamaica | Linval Laird, Evon Clarke, Howard Davis, Patrick O'Connor | 3:05.93 | |
| 3rd place, bronze medalist(s) | Italy | Marcello Pantone, Gianrico Boncompagni, Riccardo Cardone, Vito Petrella | 3:07.54 | |
| 4 | Japan | Yoshiyuki Okuyama, Yoshihiko Saito, Shunji Karube, Kazuhiko Yamazaki | 3:07.82 | |
| 5 | Soviet Union | Dmitriy Kliger, Oleg Tverdokhleb, Aleksey Petukhov, Vladimir Popov | 3:07.98 | |
| 6 | Great Britain | James Stevenson, Paul Dennis, Du'aine Ladejo, Calvin Henry | 3:08.59 | |
| 7 | Spain | Antonio Novo, Agustín Tello, Andrés Vaquero, Miguel Cuesta | 3:11.16 | |
| 8 | Norway | Eirik Madsen, Jens Storhaug, Kenneth Nielsen, Marius Rooth | 3:12.35 | |
