= Athletics at the 1992 Summer Olympics – Men's 100 metres =

Men's 100 metres at the Games of the XXV Olympiad
- Venue: Olympic Stadium
- Date: July 31 (heats); August 1 (final)
- Competitors: 81 from 66 nations
- Winning time: 9.96

Medalists
1st place, gold medalist(s)		Linford Christie; Great Britain
2nd place, silver medalist(s)		Frankie Fredericks; Namibia
3rd place, bronze medalist(s)		Dennis Mitchell; United States

Official Video

The men's 100 metres was an event at the 1992 Summer Olympics in Barcelona, Spain. There were a total number of 81 participating athletes from 66 nations, with ten qualifying heats (three qualified plus two fastest losers). Each nation was limited to 3 athletes per rules in force since the 1930 Olympic Congress.

The gold medal was won by Great Britain's Linford Christie, who had originally won the bronze medal in 1988 but was elevated to silver following the disqualification of original gold medalist Ben Johnson for using stanozolol. Silver went to Namibia's Frankie Fredericks, who also finished second in the 200 metres in Barcelona, while Dennis Mitchell of the United States of America won the bronze. Namibia had never competed in the men's 100 metres before, so Fredericks's medal was that nation's first in the event; it was also the first medal by an African country in the event since 1908 (when Reggie Walker of South Africa won gold).

== Background ==
This was the twenty-second time the event was held, having appeared at every Olympics since the first in 1896. The gold and bronze medalists from 1988, Americans Carl Lewis (the two-time defending gold medalist as well as three-time reigning world champion, struck by infection at the U.S. trials) and Calvin Smith, did not return, but British silver medalist Linford Christie (reigning Commonwealth and European champion) did. So did fourth-place finisher American Dennis Mitchell (who had taken bronze at the 1991 world championships), Brazilian fifth-place finisher Robson da Silva, Jamaican seventh-place finisher Ray Stewart, and the disqualified original champion, Canadian Ben Johnson. World championship runner-up American Leroy Burrell was also present in 1992.

The Cayman Islands, the Central African Republic, the Cook Islands, Cyprus, Gabon, Grenada, Honduras, Mauritania, Namibia, and Niger appeared in the event for the first time. It was also the only appearance of the Unified Team, following the breakup of the Soviet Union. Romania appeared independently for the first time since 1928. The United States made its 21st appearance in the event, most of any country, having missed only the boycotted 1980 Games.

== Competition format ==
The event retained the same basic four round format introduced in 1920: heats, quarterfinals, semifinals, and a final. The "fastest loser" system, introduced in 1968, was used again to ensure that the quarterfinals and subsequent rounds had exactly 8 runners per heat; this time, the system was used in only the preliminaries.

The first round consisted of 10 heats, each with 8 athletes except the last (with 9). The top three runners in each heat advanced, along with the next two fastest runners overall. This made 32 quarterfinalists, who were divided into 4 heats of 8 runners. The top four runners in each quarterfinal advanced, with no "fastest loser" places. The 16 semifinalists competed in two heats of 8, with the top four in each semifinal advancing to the eight-man final.

== Records ==
These were the standing world and Olympic records (in seconds) prior to the 1992 Summer Olympics.

World record	9.86	(United States) Carl Lewis	Tokyo (JPN)	August 25, 1991
Olympic record	9.92	(United States) Carl Lewis	Seoul (KOR)	September 24, 1988

== Results ==
=== Heats ===
==== Heat 1 ====
Rank	Athlete	Nation	Time	Notes
1	Leroy Burrell	United States	10.21	Q
2	Satoru Inoue	Japan	10.48	Q
3	Jean-Olivier Zirignon	Ivory Coast	10.55	Q
4	Abdulieh Janneh	The Gambia	10.71	
5	Hassane Illiassou	Niger	10.73	
6	Khalid Juma Juma	Bahrain	10.80	
7	Jaime Zelaya	Honduras	11.02	
8	Claude Roumain	Haiti	11.07	

==== Heat 2 ====
Rank	Athlete	Nation	Time	Notes
1	Dennis Mitchell	United States	10.21	Q
2	Vitaliy Savin	Unified Team	10.29	Q
3	Samuel Nchinda	Cameroon	10.41	Q
4	Gustavo Envela Mahua	Equatorial Guinea	10.65	
5	Florencio Aguilar	Panama	10.73	
6	Dominique Canti	San Marino	10.80	
—	Charles Tayot	Gabon	DNF	
—	Andreas Berger	Austria	DSQ	

==== Heat 3 ====
Rank	Athlete	Nation	Time	Notes
1	Linford Christie	Great Britain	10.48	Q
2	Arnaldo da Silva	Brazil	10.55	Q
3	Daniel Sangouma	France	10.63	Q
4	Ato Boldon	Trinidad and Tobago	10.77	
5	Hussain Arif	Pakistan	10.83	
6	Fabian Muyaba	Zimbabwe	10.84	
7	Pascal Dangbo	Benin	11.03	
8	Henry Daley Colphon	Costa Rica	11.11	

==== Heat 4 ====
Rank	Athlete	Nation	Time	Notes
1	Frankie Fredericks	Namibia	10.29	Q
2	Marcus Adam	Great Britain	10.57	Q
3	Atlee Mahorn	Canada	10.64	Q
4	Boevi Lawson	Togo	10.69	
5	Sriyantha Dissanayake	Sri Lanka	10.87	
6	Gabriel Simeon	Grenada	11.10	
7	Adam Hassan Sakak	Sudan	11.12	
8	Robinson Stewart	Swaziland	11.20	

==== Heat 5 ====
Rank	Athlete	Nation	Time	Notes
1	Ray Stewart	Jamaica	10.61	Q
2	Patrick Stevens	Belgium	10.63	Q
3	John Myles-Mills	Ghana	10.64	Q
4	Neville Hodge	Virgin Islands	10.71	
5	Henrico Atkins	Barbados	10.83	
6	Golam Ambia	Bangladesh	11.06	
7	Gabrieli Qoro	Fiji	11.14	
8	Mark Sherwin	Cook Islands	11.53	

==== Heat 6 ====
Rank	Athlete	Nation	Time	Notes
1	Davidson Ezinwa	Nigeria	10.31	Q
2	Ben Johnson	Canada	10.55	Q
3	Eric Akogyiram	Ghana	10.60	Q
4	Juan Trapero	Spain	10.64	
5	Joel Otim	Uganda	10.84	
6	Soryba Diakité	Guinea	11.10	
7	Ould Nouroudine	Mauritania	11.22	
8	Ahmed Shageef	Maldives	11.36	

==== Heat 7 ====
Rank	Athlete	Nation	Time	Notes
1	Olapade Adeniken	Nigeria	10.36	Q
2	Talal Mansour Al-Rahim	Qatar	10.43	Q
3	Stefan Burkart	Switzerland	10.67	Q
4	Visut Watanasin	Thailand	10.72	
5	André da Silva	Brazil	10.78	
6	Valentin Ngbogo	Central African Republic	10.79	
7	Bernard Manana	Papua New Guinea	11.35	
8	Sitthixay Sacpraseuth	Laos	12.02	

==== Heat 8 ====
Rank	Athlete	Nation	Time	Notes
1	Chidi Imoh	Nigeria	10.47	Q
2	Daniel Cojocaru	Romania	10.57	Q
3	Sanusi Turay	Sierra Leone	10.58	Q
4	Kennedy Ondieki	Kenya	10.60	
5	Kareem Streete-Thompson	Cayman Islands	10.78	
6	David Nkoua	Republic of the Congo	10.96	
7	Emery Gill	Belize	11.51	
8	Ahmed Al-Moamari Bashir	Oman	11.58	

==== Heat 9 ====
Rank	Athlete	Nation	Time	Notes
1	Max Morinière	France	10.36	Q
2	Bruny Surin	Canada	10.37	Q
3	Emmanuel Tuffour	Ghana	10.45	Q
4	Tatsuo Sugimoto	Japan	10.56	
5	Ku Wai Ming	Hong Kong	10.74	
6	Toluta'u Koula	Tonga	10.85	
7	Afonso Ferraz	Angola	11.32	
8	Fletcher Wamilee	Vanuatu	11.41	

==== Heat 10 ====
Rank	Athlete	Nation	Time	Notes
1	Robson da Silva	Brazil	10.24	Q
2	Mark Witherspoon	United States	10.27	Q
3	Pavel Galkin	Unified Team	10.43	Q
4	Yiannis Zisimides	Cyprus	10.51	q
5	Shinji Aoto	Japan	10.54	q
6	Charles Louis Seck	Senegal	10.57	
7	Ousmane Diarra	Mali	10.87	
8	Bothloko Shebe	Lesotho	10.94	
—	Patrice Traoré Zeba	Burkina Faso	DNF	

=== Quarterfinals ===
==== Quarterfinal 1 ====
Rank	Athlete	Nation	Time	Notes
1	Mark Witherspoon	United States	10.19	Q
2	Robson da Silva	Brazil	10.29	Q
3	Talal Mansour Al-Rahim	Qatar	10.32	Q
4	Max Morinière	France	10.34	Q
5	Marcus Adam	Great Britain	10.35	
6	Pavel Galkin	Unified Team	10.37	
7	Eric Akogyiram	Ghana	10.68	
8	Atlee Mahorn	Canada	10.77	

==== Quarterfinal 2 ====
Rank	Athlete	Nation	Time	Notes
1	Frankie Fredericks	Namibia	10.13	Q
2	Bruny Surin	Canada	10.24	Q
3	Vitaliy Savin	Unified Team	10.33	Q
4	Davidson Ezinwa	Nigeria	10.38	Q
5	John Myles-Mills	Ghana	10.41	
6	Stefan Burkart	Switzerland	10.57	
7	Samuel Nchinda	Cameroon	10.58	
8	Patrick Stevens	Belgium	10.69	

==== Quarterfinal 3 ====
Rank	Athlete	Nation	Time	Notes
1	Dennis Mitchell	United States	10.22	Q
2	Olapade Adeniken	Nigeria	10.22	Q
3	Emmanuel Tuffour	Ghana	10.31	Q
4	Ray Stewart	Jamaica	10.36	Q
5	Satoru Inoue	Japan	10.50	
6	Daniel Cojocaru	Romania	10.57	
7	Daniel Sangouma	France	10.64	
8	Yiannis Zisimides	Cyprus	10.65	

==== Quarterfinal 4 ====
Rank	Athlete	Nation	Time	Notes
1	Linford Christie	Great Britain	10.07	Q
2	Leroy Burrell	United States	10.08	Q
3	Chidi Imoh	Nigeria	10.21	Q
4	Ben Johnson	Canada	10.30	Q
5	Sanusi Turay	Sierra Leone	10.40	
6	Arnaldo da Silva	Brazil	10.47	
7	Shinji Aoto	Japan	10.53	
8	Jean-Olivier Zirignon	Ivory Coast	10.54	

=== Semifinals ===
==== Semifinal 1 ====
Rank	Athlete	Nation	Time	Notes
1	Leroy Burrell	United States	9.97	Q
2	Linford Christie	Great Britain	10.00	Q
3	Dennis Mitchell	United States	10.10	Q
4	Davidson Ezinwa	Nigeria	10.23	Q
5	Chidi Imoh	Nigeria	10.30	
6	Robson da Silva	Brazil	10.32	
7	Vitaliy Savin	Unified Team	10.33	
8	Ben Johnson	Canada	10.70	

==== Semifinal 2 ====
Rank	Athlete	Nation	Time	Notes
1	Frankie Fredericks	Namibia	10.17	Q
2	Bruny Surin	Canada	10.21	Q
3	Olapade Adeniken	Nigeria	10.28	Q
4	Ray Stewart	Jamaica	10.33	Q
5	Talal Mansour Al-Rahim	Qatar	10.34	
6	Emmanuel Tuffour	Ghana	10.34	
7	Max Morinière	France	10.42	
—	Mark Witherspoon	United States	DNF	

=== Final ===
The final was held on August 1, 1992. Wind: +0.5m/s

Rank	Lane	Athlete	Nation	Time
1st place, gold medalist(s)	5	Linford Christie	Great Britain	9.96
2nd place, silver medalist(s)	3	Frankie Fredericks	Namibia	10.02
3rd place, bronze medalist(s)	4	Dennis Mitchell	United States	10.04
4	1	Bruny Surin	Canada	10.09
5	6	Leroy Burrell	United States	10.10
6	8	Olapade Adeniken	Nigeria	10.12
7	2	Ray Stewart	Jamaica	10.22
8	7	Davidson Ezinwa	Nigeria	10.26

== See also ==
- 1991 Men's World Championships 100 metres
- 1993 Men's World Championships 100 metres
