= Michael Joubert =

- Michael Joubert (sprinter)

== See also ==
- Michel Joubert, Seychellois footballer
