= 1990 European Athletics Championships – Men's 100 metres =

Men's 100 metres at the 1990 European Athletics Championships
- Venue: Stadion Poljud
- Location: Split
- Dates: 27 August (heats); 28 August (semifinals & final)
- Competitors: 31 from 16 nations
- Winning time: 10.00

Medalists
gold medal	Linford Christie	Great Britain
silver medal	Daniel Sangouma	France
bronze medal	John Regis	Great Britain

These are the official results of the Men's 100 metres event at the 1990 European Championships in Split, Yugoslavia, held at Stadion Poljud on 27 and 28 August 1990.

== Participation ==
According to an unofficial count, 31 athletes from 16 countries participated in the event.

- Belgium (1)
- Cyprus (1)
- East Germany (1)
- Finland (1)
- France (3)
- Hungary (3)
- Italy (3)
- Norway (2)
- Portugal (3)
- San Marino (1)
- Soviet Union (3)
- Spain (3)
- Switzerland (1)
- Turkey (1)
- United Kingdom (3)
- West Germany (1)

== Results ==
=== Heats ===
27 August

==== Heat 1 ====
Rank	Name	Nationality	Time	Notes
1	Daniel Sangouma	France	10.21	Q
2	John Regis	United Kingdom	10.39	Q
3	Enrique Talavera	Spain	10.48	q
4	Patrick Stevens	Belgium	10.48	q
5	Ezio Madonia	Italy	10.52	q
6	Stefan Burkart	Switzerland	10.53	
7	Luis Barroso	Portugal	10.61	
			Wind: -1.2 m/s	

==== Heat 2 ====
Rank	Name	Nationality	Time	Notes
1	Max Morinière	France	10.19	Q
2	Vladimir Krylov	Soviet Union	10.27	Q
3	Linford Christie	United Kingdom	10.29	q
4	Steffen Görmer	East Germany	10.45	q
5	Florencio Gascón	Spain	10.56	
6	Peter Klein	West Germany	10.57	
7	Cengiz Kavaklıoğlu	Turkey	10.63	
8	Pedro Curvelo	Portugal	10.67	
			Wind: 0.0 m/s	

==== Heat 3 ====
Rank	Name	Nationality	Time	Notes
1	Bruno Marie-Rose	France	10.37	Q
2	Pavel Galkin	Soviet Union	10.46	Q
3	Pierfrancesco Pavoni	Italy	10.57	
4	Geir Moen	Norway	10.64	
5	Pedro Agostinho	Portugal	10.65	
6	Pál Rezák	Hungary	10.74	
7	Csaba Zajovics	Hungary	10.74	
8	Dominique Canti	San Marino	11.20	
			Wind: -0.9 m/s	

==== Heat 4 ====
Rank	Name	Nationality	Time	Notes
1	Darren Braithwaite	United Kingdom	10.32	Q
2	Stefano Tilli	Italy	10.39	Q
3	Attila Kovács	Hungary	10.46	q
4	Luis Rodríguez	Spain	10.49	q
5	Innokentiy Zharov	Soviet Union	10.52	q
6	Aham Okeke	Norway	10.61	
7	Yiannios Zisimides	Cyprus	10.62	
8	Turo Meriläinen	Finland	10.73	
			Wind: +1.1 m/s	

=== Semi-finals ===
28 August

==== Semi-final 1 ====
Rank	Name	Nationality	Time	Notes
1	Linford Christie	United Kingdom	10.09	Q
2	Bruno Marie-Rose	France	10.19	Q
3	Max Morinière	France	10.20	Q
4	John Regis	United Kingdom	10.20	Q
5	Enrique Talavera	Spain	10.42	
6	Patrick Stevens	Belgium	10.53	
7	Ezio Madonia	Italy	10.60	
	Pavel Galkin	Soviet Union	DNS	
			Wind: +0.3 m/s	

==== Semi-final 2 ====
Rank	Name	Nationality	Time	Notes
1	Daniel Sangouma	France	10.21	Q
2	Darren Braithwaite	United Kingdom	10.30	Q
3	Vladimir Krylov	Soviet Union	10.31	Q
4	Steffen Görmer	East Germany	10.40	Q
5	Stefano Tilli	Italy	10.40	
6	Innokentiy Zharov	Soviet Union	10.53	
7	Attila Kovács	Hungary	10.54	
8	Luis Rodríguez	Spain	10.56	
			Wind: -0.2 m/s	

=== Final ===
28 August

Rank	Name	Nationality	Time	Notes
1st place, gold medalist(s)	Linford Christie	United Kingdom	10.00	
2nd place, silver medalist(s)	Daniel Sangouma	France	10.04	
3rd place, bronze medalist(s)	John Regis	United Kingdom	10.07	
4	Bruno Marie-Rose	France	10.10	
5	Max Morinière	France	10.15	
6	Darren Braithwaite	United Kingdom	10.27	
7	Vladimir Krylov	Soviet Union	10.30	
8	Steffen Görmer	East Germany	10.42	
			Wind: +2.2 m/s	

== See also ==
- 1988 Men's Olympic 100 metres (Seoul)
- 1991 Men's World Championships 100 metres (Tokyo)
- 1992 Men's Olympic 100 metres (Barcelona)
