= Cengiz Kavaklıoğlu =

Turkish sprinter

Personal information
- Born: 11 September 1968 (age 58) Elazığ, Turkey

Sport
- Sport: Track and field
Medal record
Representing Turkey
Mediterranean Games
Bronze medal – third place	1991 Athens	100 m

Cengiz Kavaklıoğlu (born 11 September 1968) is a retired Turkish athlete who specialised in sprinting events. He represented his country at the 1991 and 1993 World Indoor Championships. In addition, he won a bronze medal at the 1991 Mediterranean Games.

== Competition record ==
Year	Competition	Venue	Position	Event	Notes
Representing Turkey
1990	European Championships	Split, Yugoslavia	24th (h)	100 m	10.63
1991	World Indoor Championships	Seville, Spain	23rd (sf)	60 m	6.84
1991	Mediterranean Games	Athens, Greece	3rd	100 m	10.44
1991	Mediterranean Games	Athens, Greece	8th	200 m	21.47
1991	Universiade	Sheffield, United Kingdom	22nd (qf)	100 m	10.68
1992	European Indoor Championships	Genoa, Italy	28th (h)	60 m	7.64
1992	European Indoor Championships	Genoa, Italy	22nd (h)	200 m	21.93
1993	World Indoor Championships	Toronto, Canada	36th (h)	60 m	6.99

== Personal bests ==
Outdoor

- 100 metres – 10.41 (+1.9 m/s, Athens 1991)

Indoor

- 60 metres – 6.74 (Seville 1991)
- 200 metres – 21.93 (Genoa 1992)
