= Shunji Karube =

Japanese athletics competitor

Personal information
- Nationality: Japan
- Born: 8 May 1969 (age 57) Yokohama, Kanagawa Prefecture, Japan
- Height: 1.84 m (6 ft 0 in)
- Weight: 71 kg (157 lb)

Sport
- Sport: Track and field
- Events: 400 metres 400 m hurdles
- Now coaching: Hosei University Track and Field Club

Achievements and titles
- Personal bests: 400 m: 45.57 (Tokyo 1997) 800 m: 1:48.04 (1995) 400 m hurdles: 48.34 (Tokyo 1997)
Medal record
Men's athletics
Representing Japan
World Indoor Championships
Bronze medal – third place	1997 Paris	400 m
Asian Games
Gold medal – first place	1994 Hiroshima	400 m hurdles
Gold medal – first place	1998 Bangkok	4×400 m relay
Asian Championships
Gold medal – first place	1998 Fukuoka	4×400 m relay
East Asian Games
Gold medal – first place	1993 Shanghai	400 m hurdles
Gold medal – first place	1997 Busan	4×400 m relay
Silver medal – second place	1997 Busan	400 m

Shunji Karube (苅部 俊二, Karube Shunji; born 8 May 1969 in Minami-ku, Yokohama) is a retired Japanese athlete who specialized in the 400 metres hurdles and occasionally the 400 metres.

He teaches sports at Hosei University.

== Personal bests ==
Event	Time	Venue	Date	Notes
Outdoor
400 m	45.57 s	Tokyo, Japan	6 September 1997	
800 m	1:48.04 s		26 February 1995	
400 m hurdles	48.34 s	Tokyo, Japan	5 October 1997	Japan's 4th-fastest time
Indoor
400 m	45.76 s	Paris, France	9 March 1997	Japan's record

== Records ==
- 4 × 400 m relay
  - Former Japanese university record holder - 3:07.51 s (relay leg: 4th) (Tokyo, 19 May 1991)
- 400 metres (Indoor)
  - Former Asian record holder - 45.76 s (Paris, 9 March 1997)
  - Current Japanese record holder - 45.76 s (Paris, 9 March 1997)
- 4 × 400 m relay (Indoor)
  - Current Asian and Japanese record holder - 3:05.90 s (relay leg: 4th) (Maebashi, 6 March 1999)^{[a]}

^{a} with Kazuhiro Takahashi, Jun Osakada, and Masayoshi Kan

== International competition record ==
Year	Competition	Venue	Position	Event	Notes
Representing Japan
1989	Universiade	Duisburg, West Germany	– (sf)	400 m hurdles	DNF
1991	Universiade	Sheffield, United Kingdom	5th	400 m	46.49
1991	Universiade	Sheffield, United Kingdom	4th	4 × 400 m relay	3:07.82 (relay leg: 1st)
1991	World Championships	Tokyo, Japan	13th (sf)	400 m hurdles	49.94
1993	East Asian Games	Shanghai, China	1st	400 m hurdles	49.93
1993	World Championships	Stuttgart, Germany	12th (sf)	400 m hurdles	49.31
1993	World Championships	Stuttgart, Germany	11th (sf)	4 × 400 m relay	3:02.43 (relay leg: 2nd)
1994	Asian Games	Hiroshima, Japan	1st	400 m hurdles	49.13
1994	Asian Games	Hiroshima, Japan	4th	4 × 400 m relay	3:10.91 (relay leg: 4th)
1995	World Championships	Gothenburg, Sweden	– (sf)	400 m hurdles	DQ
1995	World Championships	Gothenburg, Sweden	8th (sf)	4 × 400 m relay	3:01.46 (relay leg: 1st)
1996	Olympic Games	Atlanta, United States	12th (h)	400 m hurdles	48.96
1996	Olympic Games	Atlanta, United States	5th	4 × 400 m relay	3:00.76 (relay leg: 1st) AR
1997	World Indoor Championships	Paris, France	3rd	400 m	45.76 AR
1997	World Indoor Championships	Paris, France	6th	4 × 400 m relay	3:20.18 (relay leg: 1st)
1997	East Asian Games	Busan, South Korea	2nd	400 m	46.08
1997	East Asian Games	Busan, South Korea	1st	4 × 400 m relay	3:04.35 (relay leg: 4th)
1997	World Championships	Athens, Greece	10th (sf)	400 m hurdles	48.81
1997	World Championships	Athens, Greece	10th (sf)	4 × 400 m relay	3:03.85 (relay leg: 1st)
1997	Grand Prix Final	Fukuoka, Japan	7th	400 m hurdles	49.02
1998	Asian Championships	Fukuoka, Japan	6th	400 m	46.22
1998	Asian Championships	Fukuoka, Japan	1st	4 × 400 m relay	3:02.61 (relay leg: 3rd)
1998	Asian Games	Bangkok, Thailand	1st	4 × 400 m relay	3:01.70 (relay leg: 4th)
1999	World Indoor Championships	Maebashi, Japan	5th	4 × 400 m relay	3:06.22 (relay leg: 4th)
1999	World Championships	Seville, Spain	17th (h)	400 m hurdles	49.52
2000	Olympic Games	Sydney, Australia	15th (sf)	4 × 400 m relay	3:13.63 (relay leg: 1st)

== National championships ==
He has won the individual national championship 3 times.

- 1 win in the 400 metres (1993)
- 2 wins in the 400 metres hurdles (1994, 1997)
