= 1990 European Athletics Indoor Championships – Men's 60 metres =

The men's 60 metres event at the 1990 European Athletics Indoor Championships was held in Kelvin Hall on 3 March.

== Medalists ==
Gold	Silver	Bronze
Linford Christie; Great Britain	Pierfrancesco Pavoni; Italy	Jiří Valík; Czechoslovakia

== Results ==
=== Heats ===
First 3 from each heat (Q) and the next 4 fastest (q) qualified for the semifinals.

Rank	Heat	Name	Nationality	Time	Notes
1	2	Pierfrancesco Pavoni	Italy	6.61	Q
2	1	Linford Christie	Great Britain	6.66	Q
3	2	Bruno Marie-Rose	France	6.68	Q
4	2	José Javier Arqués	Spain	6.69	Q
4	3	Enrique Talavera	Spain	6.69	Q, PB
6	1	Jiří Valík	Czechoslovakia	6.70	Q
7	2	Nigel Walker	Great Britain	6.71	q
8	3	Andreas Berger	Austria	6.72	Q
9	1	Sergio López	Spain	6.73	Q
10	1	Vitaliy Savin	Soviet Union	6.74	q
10	1	Raymond Schüler	West Germany	6.74	q
10	2	Dietmar Schulte	West Germany	6.74	q
13	3	Jason Livingston	Great Britain	6.77	Q
14	3	Franz Ratzenberger	Austria	6.77	
15	1	Antoine Richard	France	6.78	
16	3	Stefan Burkart	Switzerland	6.79	
17	2	Jouni Myllymäki	Finland	6.81	
18	3	Kennet Kjensli	Norway	6.83	

=== Semifinals ===
First 2 from each semifinal qualified directly (Q) for the final.

Rank	Heat	Name	Nationality	Time	Notes
1	1	Pierfrancesco Pavoni	Italy	6.58	Q
2	2	Linford Christie	Great Britain	6.61	Q
3	1	Jiří Valík	Czechoslovakia	6.63	Q
3	2	Andreas Berger	Austria	6.63	Q
5	2	José Javier Arqués	Spain	6.66	
5	3	Bruno Marie-Rose	France	6.66	Q
7	1	Enrique Talavera	Spain	6.70	
8	1	Nigel Walker	Great Britain	6.70	
9	3	Jason Livingston	Great Britain	6.72	Q
10	3	Raymond Schüler	West Germany	6.73	
11	3	Sergio López	Spain	6.74	
12	2	Vitaliy Savin	Soviet Union	6.77	
13	1	Dietmar Schulte	West Germany	6.78	

=== Final ===
Rank	Lane	Name	Nationality	Time	Notes
1st place, gold medalist(s)	2	Linford Christie	Great Britain	6.56	
2nd place, silver medalist(s)	3	Pierfrancesco Pavoni	Italy	6.59	
3rd place, bronze medalist(s)	1	Jiří Valík	Czechoslovakia	6.63	
4	4	Andreas Berger	Austria	6.64	
5	5	Bruno Marie-Rose	France	6.66	
6	6	Jason Livingston	Great Britain	6.75	
