= 1991 IAAF World Indoor Championships – Men's 60 metres =

The men's 60 metres event at the 1991 IAAF World Indoor Championships was held on 8 March.

== Medalists ==
| Gold | Silver | Bronze |
|---|---|---|
| Andre Cason; United States | Linford Christie; Great Britain | Chidi Imoh; Nigeria |

== Results ==
=== Heats ===
First 2 of each heat (Q) and next 12 fastest (q) qualified for the semifinals.

| Rank | Heat | Name | Nationality | Time | Notes |
|---|---|---|---|---|---|
| 1 | 5 | Andre Cason | United States | 6.52 | Q, PB |
| 2 | 6 | Linford Christie | Great Britain | 6.61 | Q |
| 3 | 5 | Joel Isasi | Cuba | 6.63 | Q, PB |
| 4 | 6 | Bruny Surin | Canada | 6.64 | Q |
| 5 | 3 | Andrés Simón | Cuba | 6.65 | Q |
| 6 | 2 | Vitaliy Savin | Soviet Union | 6.68 | Q |
| 7 | 4 | Chidi Imoh | Nigeria | 6.69 | Q |
| 8 | 5 | Charles-Louis Seck | Senegal | 6.70 | q |
| 9 | 2 | Andreas Berger | Austria | 6.71 | Q |
| 9 | 3 | Jean-Olivier Zirignon | Ivory Coast | 6.71 | Q |
| 11 | 3 | Sanusi Turay | Sierra Leone | 6.73 | q, NR |
| 11 | 6 | Franz Ratzenberger | Austria | 6.73 | q |
| 13 | 1 | Michael Rosswess | Great Britain | 6.74 | Q |
| 13 | 2 | Cengiz Kavaklıoğlu | Turkey | 6.74 | q, NR |
| 13 | 3 | Florencio Gascón | Spain | 6.74 | q |
| 16 | 1 | Ben Johnson | Canada | 6.75 | Q |
| 17 | 1 | Antonio Ullo | Italy | 6.76 | q |
| 17 | 1 | Luis Turón | Spain | 6.76 | q |
| 17 | 6 | Emmanuel Tuffour | Ghana | 6.76 | q |
| 17 | 6 | Samuel Nchinda | Cameroon | 6.76 | q, NR |
| 21 | 2 | Dietmar Schulte | Germany | 6.77 | q |
| 21 | 4 | Michael Huke | Germany | 6.77 | Q |
| 23 | 4 | Eric Akogyiram | Ghana | 6.80 | q |
| 24 | 4 | Jiří Valík | Czechoslovakia | 6.81 | q |
| 25 | 3 | Abdullahi Tetengi | Nigeria | 6.85 | |
| 25 | 5 | Arnaldo da Silva | Brazil | 6.85 | |
| 27 | 4 | Carlos Moreno | Chile | 6.86 | NR |
| 28 | 1 | Einar Þór Einarsson | Iceland | 6.91 | NR |
| 29 | 3 | Fernando Botasso | Brazil | 6.93 | |
| 30 | 1 | Lai Cheng-chuan | Chinese Taipei | 6.95 | |
| 31 | 3 | Clinton Bufuku | Zambia | 6.96 | NR |
| 32 | 1 | Laurent Kemp | Luxembourg | 6.97 | NR |
| 33 | 2 | Amadou Mbaye | Senegal | 6.98 | |
| 34 | 6 | Dudley den Dulk | Netherlands Antilles | 7.01 | |
| 35 | 4 | Carlos García | Dominican Republic | 7.11 | |
| 36 | 4 | Rodney Cox | Turks and Caicos Islands | 7.11 | NR |
| 37 | 2 | Guillermo Saucedo | Bolivia | 7.20 | |
| 38 | 5 | António Afonso Deslandes | Angola | 7.23 | |
| 39 | 6 | Trevor Davis | Anguilla | 7.24 | |
| | 2 | Dominique Canti | San Marino | DNS | |
| | 5 | Félix Molina | Puerto Rico | DNS | |

=== Semifinals ===
First 2 of each semifinal (Q) and next two fastest (q) qualified for the final.

| Rank | Heat | Name | Nationality | Time | Notes |
|---|---|---|---|---|---|
| 1 | 1 | Andre Cason | United States | 6.55 | Q |
| 2 | 2 | Linford Christie | Great Britain | 6.56 | Q |
| 3 | 2 | Chidi Imoh | Nigeria | 6.60 | Q |
| 3 | 3 | Andrés Simón | Cuba | 6.60 | Q |
| 5 | 3 | Bruny Surin | Canada | 6.61 | Q, =PB |
| 6 | 1 | Joel Isasi | Cuba | 6.63 | Q, =PB |
| 7 | 2 | Ben Johnson | Canada | 6.63 | q |
| 8 | 3 | Vitaliy Savin | Soviet Union | 6.66 | q |
| 9 | 1 | Michael Rosswess | Great Britain | 6.68 | |
| 9 | 2 | Andreas Berger | Austria | 6.68 | |
| 11 | 2 | Luis Turón | Spain | 6.69 | PB |
| 11 | 3 | Emmanuel Tuffour | Ghana | 6.69 | |
| 13 | 1 | Florencio Gascón | Spain | 6.75 | |
| 13 | 2 | Dietmar Schulte | Germany | 6.75 | |
| 15 | 1 | Charles-Louis Seck | Senegal | 6.76 | |
| 16 | 2 | Sanusi Turay | Sierra Leone | 6.76 | |
| 16 | 3 | Franz Ratzenberger | Austria | 6.76 | |
| 18 | 1 | Eric Akogyiram | Ghana | 6.77 | |
| 18 | 2 | Antonio Ullo | Italy | 6.77 | |
| 20 | 1 | Jiří Valík | Czechoslovakia | 6.79 | |
| 21 | 3 | Jean-Olivier Zirignon | Ivory Coast | 6.80 | |
| 22 | 3 | Samuel Nchinda | Cameroon | 6.83 | |
| 23 | 3 | Cengiz Kavaklıoğlu | Turkey | 6.84 | |
| 24 | 1 | Michael Huke | Germany | 6.94 | |

=== Final ===
| Rank | Lane | Name | Nationality | Time | Notes |
|---|---|---|---|---|---|
| 1st place, gold medalist(s) | 5 | Andre Cason | United States | 6.54 | |
| 2nd place, silver medalist(s) | 3 | Linford Christie | Great Britain | 6.55 | |
| 3rd place, bronze medalist(s) | 6 | Chidi Imoh | Nigeria | 6.60 | |
| 4 | 2 | Ben Johnson | Canada | 6.61 | F1 |
| 5 | 4 | Andrés Simón | Cuba | 6.61 | |
| 6 | 1 | Joel Isasi | Cuba | 6.64 | |
| 7 | 8 | Vitaliy Savin | Soviet Union | 6.66 | |
| 8 | 7 | Bruny Surin | Canada | 6.66 | |
