= Athletics at the 1989 Summer Universiade – Men's 400 metres hurdles =

The men's 400 metres hurdles event at the 1989 Summer Universiade was held at the Wedaustadion in Duisburg on 25, 26, and 27 August 1989.

== Medalists ==
Gold	Silver	Bronze
Reggie Davis; United States	Vladimir Budko; Soviet Union	Kevin Henderson; United States

== Results ==
=== Heats ===
Rank	Heat	Athlete	Nationality	Time	Notes
1	4	Reggie Davis	United States	50.96	Q
2	4	Carsten Köhrbrück	West Germany	51.10	Q
3	4	John Graham	Canada	51.29	Q
4	4	Santiago Fraga	Spain	51.33	q
5	2	Mauro Maurizi	Italy	51.35	Q
6	2	German Petrov	Soviet Union	51.42	Q
7	3	Thomas Futterknecht	Austria	51.43	Q
8	4	Mugur Mateescu	Romania	51.50	q
9	1	Kevin Henderson	United States	51.51	Q
10	1	Peter Eriksson	Sweden	51.62	Q
11	2	Philip Harries	Great Britain	51.85	Q
12	1	Francisco Velazco	Cuba	51.87	Q
13	3	Vladimir Budko	Soviet Union	52.08	Q
14	2	Juan Vallín	Mexico	52.50	q
15	2	Shunji Karube	Japan	52.62	q
16	1	Darren Wright	Australia	52.93	q
17	4	Ilan Goldwasser	Israel	53.02	
18	1	Paulo Barrigana	Portugal	53.07	
19	4	António Sérgio Damasio	Portugal	53.22	
20	3	Pel van der Kerkhoff	Netherlands	53.42	
21	1	Joe Ross	Canada	53.71	
22	3	Zhao Cunlin	China	54.25	
23	3	John Barry	Ireland	56.13	
24	3	Cheung Shiu Sun	Hong Kong	1:08.71	
	3	Hamidou M'Baye	Senegal	DQ	

=== Semifinals ===
Rank	Heat	Athlete	Nationality	Time	Notes
1	1	Reggie Davis	United States	49.11	Q
2	2	John Graham	Canada	50.03	Q
3	2	Carsten Köhrbrück	West Germany	50.05	Q
4	2	Kevin Henderson	United States	50.32	Q
5	1	Vladimir Budko	Soviet Union	50.61	Q
6	1	Peter Eriksson	Sweden	50.83	Q
7	2	German Petrov	Soviet Union	50.87	q
8	1	Francisco Velazco	Cuba	50.97	q
9	1	Mugur Mateescu	Romania	51.08	
10	2	Thomas Futterknecht	Austria	51.10	
11	1	Mauro Maurizi	Italy	51.54	
12	2	Juan Vallín	Mexico	51.58	
13	1	Santiago Fraga	Spain	51.59	
14	2	Philip Harries	Great Britain	51.73	
15	1	Darren Wright	Australia	52.96	
	2	Shunji Karube	Japan	DNF	

=== Final ===
Rank	Athlete	Nationality	Time	Notes
1st place, gold medalist(s)	Reggie Davis	United States	49.74	
2nd place, silver medalist(s)	Vladimir Budko	Soviet Union	50.30	
3rd place, bronze medalist(s)	Kevin Henderson	United States	50.57	
4	Peter Eriksson	Sweden	50.59	
5	John Graham	Canada	50.78	
6	Carsten Köhrbrück	West Germany	50.88	
7	Francisco Velazco	Cuba	51.80	
8	German Petrov	Soviet Union	52.33	
