= Abel Nzimande =

South African sprinter

Personal information
- Nationality: South African
- Born: 19 November 1961 (age 64) Bloemfontein, South Africa
- Height: 178 cm (5 ft 10 in)
- Weight: 66 kg (146 lb)

Sport
- Sport: Sprinting
- Event: 200 metres
Medal record
Men's athletics
Representing South Africa
African Championships
Bronze medal – third place	1993 Durban	4×100 m

Abel Tshaka Tshakile Nzimande (born November 19, 1961) is a South African sprinter. He competed in the men's 200 metres at the 1992 Summer Olympics.
