= Evon Clarke =

Jamaican sprinter

Personal information
- Born: 2 March 1965 (age 61)

Sport
- Sport: Track and field
Medal record
Representing Jamaica
Central American and Caribbean Games
Gold medal – first place	1990 Mexico City	4x400 m relay
Bronze medal – third place	1993 Ponce	4x400 m relay
Summer Universiade
Silver medal – second place	1991 Sheffield	4x400 m relay
Silver medal – second place	1993 Buffalo	4x400 m relay

Evon George Clarke (born 2 March 1965) is a retired Jamaican sprinter. He represented his country at one indoor and one outdoor World Championship. He competed in the 1992 Olympics. He earned a bachelor's degree and a master's degree from the New York Institute of Technology.

== International competitions ==
Year	Competition	Venue	Position	Event	Notes
Representing Jamaica
1990	Central American and Caribbean Games	Mexico City, Mexico	–	4 × 100 m relay	DQ
1990	Central American and Caribbean Games	Mexico City, Mexico	1st	4 × 400 m relay	3:05.22
1991	World Indoor Championships	Seville, Spain	6th	4 × 400 m relay	3:10.33
1991	Universiade	Sheffield, United Kingdom	13th (sf)	400 m	47.68
1991	Universiade	Sheffield, United Kingdom	4th (h)	4 × 100 m relay	40.01
1991	Universiade	Sheffield, United Kingdom	2nd	4 × 400 m relay	3:05.93
1993	Universiade	Buffalo, United States	2nd	400 m	46.27
1993	Universiade	Buffalo, United States	6th	4 × 400 m relay	3:07.45
1993	World Championships	Stuttgart, Germany	10th (sf)	400 m	45.19
1993	Central American and Caribbean Games	Ponce, Puerto Rico	5th	400 m	46.73
1993	Central American and Caribbean Games	Ponce, Puerto Rico	3rd	4 × 400 m relay	3:07.23
