= 1999 IAAF World Indoor Championships – Men's 60 metres =

The men's 60 metres event at the 1999 IAAF World Indoor Championships was held on March 7.

== Medalists ==
Gold	Silver	Bronze
Maurice Greene; United States	Tim Harden; United States	Jason Gardener; Great Britain

== Results ==
=== Heats ===
First 2 of each heat (Q) and next 12 fastest (q) qualified for the semifinals.

Rank	Heat	Name	Nationality	Time	Notes
1	4	Tim Harden	United States	6.51	Q
2	4	Donovan Powell	Jamaica	6.51	Q, PB
3	1	Matt Shirvington	Australia	6.52	Q, AR
4	1	Jason Gardener	Great Britain	6.54	Q
5	2	Georgios Theodoridis	Greece	6.56	Q, PB
6	2	Maurice Greene	United States	6.56	Q
7	4	Marcin Nowak	Poland	6.57	q, PB
8	6	Raymond Stewart	Jamaica	6.58	Q
9	6	Bruny Surin	Canada	6.58	Q
10	1	Patrick Schneider	Germany	6.59	q
10	6	Luis Alberto Pérez-Rionda	Cuba	6.59	q, PB
12	2	Jason Livingston	Great Britain	6.60	q
13	5	Cédric Grand	Switzerland	6.61	Q
14	5	Marc Blume	Germany	6.62	Q
15	4	Nobuharu Asahara	Japan	6.63	q, SB
16	5	O'Brian Gibbons	Canada	6.64	q, PB
17	3	Deji Aliu	Nigeria	6.65	Q
18	1	Gennadiy Chernovol	Kazakhstan	6.66	q
18	6	Vitaly Medvedev	Kazakhstan	6.66	q
20	3	Koji Ito	Japan	6.68	Q
20	4	Watson Nyambek	Malaysia	6.68	q, NR
22	2	Diego Santos	Spain	6.71	q
22	3	Gábor Dobos	Hungary	6.71	q
24	2	Sanusi Turay	Sierra Leone	6.72	q
24	5	David Baxter	Australia	6.72	
26	2	Chris Donaldson	New Zealand	6.73	
27	4	Sayon Cooper	Liberia	6.74	NR
28	3	Renward Wells	Bahamas	6.76	
28	5	Wai Lok To	Hong Kong	6.76	
30	6	Patrick Mocci-Raoumbé	Gabon	6.80	
31	5	Stéphane Buckland	Mauritius	6.81	
32	2	Rolando Blanco	Guatemala	6.82	
32	3	Carlos Gats	Argentina	6.82	
32	3	Justin Ayassou	Togo	6.82	
35	5	Pascal Dangbo	Benin	6.86	NR
36	3	Mohd Yusof Alias	Singapore	6.94	
36	6	Alex Gabito	Philippines	6.94	
38	5	Eric Nkansah	Ghana	6.96	
39	1	Sylla Alseny Kobele	Guinea	6.97	
40	4	Remy Neville	Dominica	6.98	
41	1	Timothy Brooks	Anguilla	7.05	NR
42	2	Brahim Abdoulaye	Chad	7.17	
43	4	Norberto Nsue Ondo	Equatorial Guinea	7.27	
44	6	Molise Rammita	Lesotho	7.30	
45	6	Sisomphone Vongphakdy	Laos	7.31	
	1	De-Von Bean	Bermuda	DQ	
	1	Antoine Boussombo	Gabon	DNS	
	3	Ryszard Pilarczyk	Poland	DNS	

=== Semifinals ===
First 2 of each semifinal (Q) and next 2 fastest (q) qualified for the final.

Rank	Heat	Name	Nationality	Time	Notes
1	2	Maurice Greene	United States	6.45	Q, CR
2	1	Tim Harden	United States	6.47	Q
3	3	Jason Gardener	Great Britain	6.49	Q, PB
4	1	Donovan Powell	Jamaica	6.50	Q, PB
5	1	Deji Aliu	Nigeria	6.50	q
6	3	Matt Shirvington	Australia	6.53	Q
7	2	Jason Livingston	Great Britain	6.54	Q, SB
8	2	Bruny Surin	Canada	6.57	q
9	2	Georgios Theodoridis	Greece	6.58	
9	3	Luis Alberto Pérez-Rionda	Cuba	6.58	
11	3	Marc Blume	Germany	6.59	
12	2	Raymond Stewart	Jamaica	6.60	
12	3	Nobuharu Asahara	Japan	6.60	SB
14	1	Koji Ito	Japan	6.62	
14	2	Gábor Dobos	Hungary	6.62	
16	3	Cédric Grand	Switzerland	6.64	
17	3	Vitaly Medvedev	Kazakhstan	6.65	
18	2	Watson Nyambek	Malaysia	6.66	AR
19	2	Patrick Schneider	Germany	6.68	
20	3	Diego Santos	Spain	6.70	
21	1	O'Brian Gibbons	Canada	6.71	
22	1	Gennadiy Chernovol	Kazakhstan	6.73	
23	1	Sanusi Turay	Sierra Leone	6.77	
	1	Marcin Nowak	Poland	DNS	

=== Final ===
Rank	Lane	Name	Nationality	Time	Notes
1st place, gold medalist(s)	3	Maurice Greene	United States	6.42	CR
2nd place, silver medalist(s)	6	Tim Harden	United States	6.43	PB
3rd place, bronze medalist(s)	5	Jason Gardener	Great Britain	6.46	AR
4	2	Matt Shirvington	Australia	6.52	AR
5	1	Deji Aliu	Nigeria	6.58	
6	4	Donovan Powell	Jamaica	6.59	
7	7	Jason Livingston	Great Britain	6.63	
8	8	Bruny Surin	Canada	6.64	
