= Sanusi Turay =

Sierra Leonean sprinter

Personal information
- Born: 14 April 1968 (age 58)
- Height: 1.88 m (6 ft 2 in)
- Weight: 93 kg (205 lb)

Sport
- Sport: Athletics
- Events: 60 metres, 100 metres
Medal record
Representing Sierra Leone
Summer Universiade
Silver medal – second place	1991 Sheffield	4x100m relay

Sanusi Turay (born 14 April 1968) is a retired Sierra Leonean athlete who specialised in the sprinting events. He represented his country at the 1992 and 1996 Summer Olympics, as well as two outdoor and four indoor World Championships.

== Competition record ==
Year	Competition	Venue	Position	Event	Notes
Representing Sierra Leone
1991	World Indoor Championships	Seville, Spain	15th (sf)	60 m	6.76
1991	Universiade	Sheffield, United Kingdom	2nd (h)	100 m	10.32
1991	Universiade	Sheffield, United Kingdom	2nd	4x100 m relay	39.88
1992	Olympic Games	Barcelona, Spain	19th (qf)	100 m	10.40
1992	Olympic Games	Barcelona, Spain	14th (sf)	4x100 m relay	40.46
1993	World Indoor Championships	Toronto, Canada	15th (sf)	60 m	6.78
1993	World Championships	Stuttgart, Germany	42nd (h)	100 m	10.68
1993	World Championships	Stuttgart, Germany	21st (h)	4x100 m relay	40.69
1994	Commonwealth Games	Victoria, Canada	23rd (qf)	100 m	10.47
1994	Commonwealth Games	Victoria, Canada	–	4x100 m relay	DQ
1995	World Indoor Championships	Barcelona, Spain	29th (h)	60 m	6.82
1995	World Championships	Gothenburg, Sweden	39th (qf)	100 m	10.55
1996	Olympic Games	Atlanta, United States	36th (h)	100 m	10.39
1996	Olympic Games	Atlanta, United States	9th (sf)	4x100 m relay	38.91
1998	Commonwealth Games	Kuala Lumpur, Malaysia	31st (qf)	100 m	10.75
1998	Commonwealth Games	Kuala Lumpur, Malaysia	6th	4x100 m relay	39.79
1999	World Indoor Championships	Maebashi, Japan	23rd (sf)	60 m	6.77

4 x 100m relay 2nd, All African Games (Cairo 1991)

4 x 100m relay 2nd, All African Games (Harare 1995) 4 x 100m relay 3rd, World Cup in Athletics (Havana 1992)

== Personal bests ==
Outdoor

- 100 metres – 10.25 (+0.7 m/s) (Athens 1996)
- 200 metres – 21.04 (-1.4 m/s) (Germiston, SA 1992)

Indoor

- 60 metres – 6.68 (San Sabastian, Spain 1993)
