= Helen Barnett-Burkart =

British athlete (born 1958)

Helen Burkart
Personal information
- Nationality: British (English)
- Born: 13 May 1958 (age 68) London, England
- Height: 170 cm (5 ft 7 in)
- Weight: 62 kg (137 lb)

Sport
- Sport: Athletics
- Event: Sprinting/400 metres
- Club: Croydon Harriers

Helen Catherine Burkart (née Barnett; born 13 May 1958) is a British retired sprinter who competed at two Olympic Games.

== Biography ==
Barnett finished third behind Andrea Lynch in the 100 metres and third behind Denise Ramsden in the 200 metres at the 1976 WAAA Championships.

She represented England in the 200 metres event, at the 1982 Commonwealth Games in Brisbane, Queensland, Australia.

She competed in the women's 400 metres at the 1984 Summer Olympics.

She later represented England in the 400 metres event, at the 1986 Commonwealth Games in Edinburgh, Scotland. She married the Swiss sprinter Stefan Burkart in 1986, and went on to represent Switzerland at the 1992 Summer Olympics in the women's 4 × 400 metres relay.

Year	Competition	Venue	Position	Event	Notes
Representing Great Britain / England
1982	Commonwealth Games	Brisbane, Australia	9th	200 m	23.57
1984	Olympic Games	Los Angeles, United States	12th (sf)	400m	52.26
1984	Olympic Games	Los Angeles, United States	4th	4 × 400 m	3:25.51
1986	Commonwealth Games	Edinburgh, United Kingdom	9th (h)	400 m	54.29
1986	European Championships	Stuttgart, Germany	10th (sf)	400 m	52.47
Representing Switzerland
1992	Olympic Games	Barcelona, Spain	9th (h)	4 × 400 m	3:31.26
1993	World Championships	Stuttgart, Germany	8th	4 × 400 m	3:28.52

== Personal life ==
Barnett married Stefan Burkart, who represented Switzerland at the 1992 and 1996 Summer Olympics. Their son Nishan Burkart is a footballer and a youth international with the Switzerland national under-20 football team.
