= Dietmar Schulte =

German sprinter (born 1965)

Dietmar Schulte (born 17 September 1965) is a retired West German sprinter.

In the 60 metres he reached the semi-final at the 1990 European Indoor Championships and the 1991 World Indoor Championships. He became (West) German indoor champion in the 60 metres in 1990 and 1991. He then represented the club TV Wattenscheid.

His personal best times were 6.65 seconds in the 60 metres, achieved in February 1990 in Sindelfingen; and 10.43 seconds in the 60 metres, achieved in July 1991 in Garbsen.
