= Jiří Valík =

Czech sprinter

Jiří Valík (born 26 July 1966 in Zábřeh) is a Czech retired athlete who specialised in the sprinting events. He is best known for winning the bronze medal in the 60 metres at the 1990 European Indoor Championships. In addition, he competed at two indoor and one outdoor World Championships.

== Competition record ==
Year	Competition	Venue	Position	Event	Notes
Representing Czechoslovakia
1988	European Indoor Championships	Budapest, Hungary	13th (h)	60 m	6.78
1988	European Indoor Championships	Budapest, Hungary	15th (h)	200 m	21.61
1990	European Indoor Championships	Glasgow, United Kingdom	3rd	60 m	6.63
1991	World Indoor Championships	Seville, Spain	20th (sf)	60 m	6.79
1991	World Indoor Championships	Seville, Spain	18th (sf)	200 m	22.41
1992	European Indoor Championships	Genoa, Italy	12th (sf)	60 m	6.75
1992	European Indoor Championships	Genoa, Italy	12th (sf)	200 m	22.29
Representing the Czech Republic
1993	World Indoor Championships	Toronto, Canada	14th (h)	60 m	6.74
1993	World Indoor Championships	Toronto, Canada	18th (h)	200 m	21.47
1993	World Championships	Stuttgart, Germany	27th (qf)	100 m	10.53
1993	World Championships	Stuttgart, Germany	38th (h)	200 m	21.20

== Personal bests ==
Outdoor

- 100 metres – 10.27 (+0.3 m/s Nitra 1992)
- 200 metres – 20.81 (+0.4 m/s Drama 1987)

Indoor

- 50 metres – 5.73 (Prague 1990) NR
- 60 metres – 6.63 (Glasgow 1990)
- 200 metres – 21.18 (Genoa 1992)
