= Jaime Zelaya =

Honduran sprinter (born 1965)

Personal information
- Full name: Jaime Emilson Zelaya García
- Nationality: Honduran
- Born: 10 July 1965 (age 61)

Sport
- Sport: Athletics

Jaime Emilson Zelaya García (born 10 July 1965) is a Honduran sprinter. Zelaya would compete at the 1992 Summer Olympics, representing Honduras in two sprinting events. In the men's 100 metres, he would not advance past the heats though would be the first Honduran Olympian to run the distance at a Games.

He would also run in the men's 200 metres, also not advancing past the heats. In both of the races, he would set personal bests. Later on, he would remain active in the sport, winning two medals at the 2016 Central American Masters Athletics Championships.

== Biography ==
Jaime Emilson Zelaya García was born on 10 July 1965.

Zelaya would compete for Honduras at the 1992 Summer Olympics in Barcelona, Spain, in two sprinting events. He would first compete in the heats of the men's 100 metres on 31 July against seven other competitors in his round. There, he would finish with a time of 11.02 seconds, placing seventh in his heat and did not advance further to the quarterfinals. Though he would not advance to the quarterfinals, he would become the first Honduran Olympian to compete in the men's 100 metres.

His next event would be the heats of the men's 200 metres on 3 August against seven other competitors in his round. There, he would finish with a time of 22.05 seconds and place last in his heat; he would not advance to the quarterfinals. In both of the events, he had set personal bests for the distances.

Later on, he would still be active in the sport. At the 2016 Central American Masters Athletics Championships, Zelaya won the 200 metres in the M50 category with a time of 26.10 seconds. He would also win the silver medal in the 100 metres with a time of 12.64 seconds.
