= Apisai Driu Baibai =

Fijian sprinter

Personal information
- Nationality: Fijian
- Born: 18 November 1970 (age 55)

Sport
- Sport: Sprinting
- Event: 200 metres

Apisai Driu Baibai (born 18 November 1970) is a Fijian sprinter. He competed in the men's 200 metres at the 1992 Summer Olympics.
