= Juan Vicente Matala =

Equatoguinean sprinter

Personal information
- Nationality: Equatoguinean
- Born: 27 July 1969 (age 56)

Sport
- Sport: Sprinting
- Event: 200 metres

Juan Vicente Matala (born 27 July 1969) is an Equatoguinean sprinter. He competed in the men's 200 metres at the 1992 Summer Olympics.

== Career ==
Matala was an Equatorial Guinean leader over three distances in 1991. On 21 July, he ran the top 200 and 400 metres times of 22.51 and 55.66 seconds respectively at a meeting in Malabo. He later ran the top 100 metres time of 11.25 seconds on 1 September 1991 also in Malabo. On 23 February 1992, Matala won a 100 metres competition in Equatorial Guinea. His time of 11.84 seconds won by one hundredth of a second.

Matala was seeded in the 8th 200 metres heat at the 1992 Olympics. He was disqualified.

At the Olympics, Matala was visited by an athletics team to exchange impressions.

At another meeting in 1992, Matala ran 23.4 seconds for 200 metres.
