= Jeroen Fischer =

Belgian athletics competitor

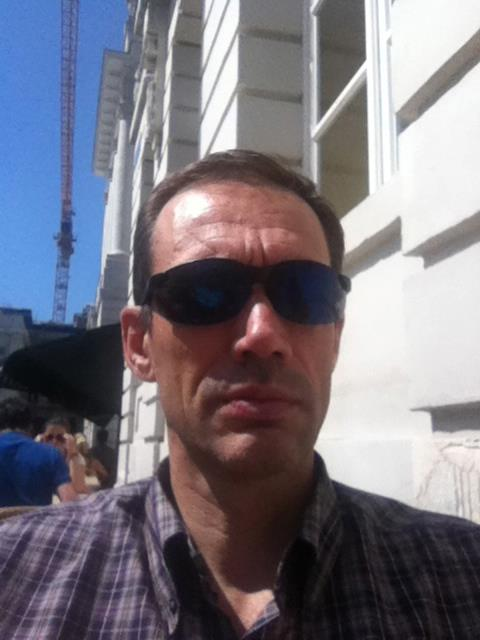

Personal information
- Born: 12 February 1966 (age 60)

Sport
- Sport: Track and field
Medal record
Representing Belgium
Summer Universiade
Bronze medal – third place	1991 Sheffield	4x100m relay

Jeroen Fischer (born 12 February 1966) is a retired Belgian sprinter and long jumper.

As a long jumper he finished eleventh at the 1987 European Indoor Championships, His personal best jump was 8.01 metres, achieved in July 1987 in Brussels. He then took his only Belgian championship title.

As a sprinter he competed at the 1986 European Championships and the 1991 World Indoor Championships without reaching the final. At the 1991 Summer Universiade he finished seventh in the 200 metres and won a bronze medal in the 4 × 100 metres relay.

He became Belgian 200 metres champion in 1986, 1987 and 1991; and 400 metres champion in 1988, 1989 and 1990. His personal best times were 10.44 seconds in the 100 metres, achieved in May 1988 in Nivelles; 20.84 seconds in the 200 metres, achieved in May 1988 in Nivelles; and 46.24 seconds in the 400 metres, achieved in September 1988 in Brussels.
