= Seaksarn Boonrat =

Thai sprinter

Personal information
- Nationality: Thai
- Born: 1 April 1969 (age 57)

Sport
- Sport: Sprinting
- Event: 200 metres
Medal record
Men's athletics
Representing Thailand
Asian Championships
Silver medal – second place	1991 Kuala Lumpur	4×100 m
Bronze medal – third place	1993 Manila	4×100 m

Seaksarn Boonrat (born 1 April 1969) is a Thai sprinter. He competed in the men's 200 metres at the 1992 Summer Olympics.
