= Nishan Burkart =

Swiss-English footballer (born 2000)

Personal information
- Full name: Nishan Connell Burkart
- Date of birth: 31 January 2000 (age 26)
- Place of birth: Aarau, Switzerland
- Height: 1.74 m (5 ft 9 in)
- Position: Centre-forward

Team information
- Current team: Winterthur
- Number: 99

Youth career
- –2016: Zürich
- 2016–2019: Manchester United

Senior career*
Years	Team	Apps	(Gls)
2019–2023	SC Freiburg II	74	(19)
2021–2023	SC Freiburg	1	(0)
2022–2023	→ Winterthur (loan)	24	(3)
2023–	Winterthur	80	(17)

International career^{‡}
2014–2015	Switzerland U15	6	(4)
2015–2016	Switzerland U16	6	(1)
2016–2017	Switzerland U17	9	(3)
2018	Switzerland U18	1	(0)
2017–2019	Switzerland U19	10	(2)
2019	Switzerland U20	6	(0)
- * Club domestic league appearances and goals as of 26 May 2026 ‡ National team caps and goals as of 20:17, 3 April 2021 (UTC)

Nishan Connell Burkart (born 31 January 2000) is a Swiss professional footballer who plays as a centre-forward for Swiss Super League club Winterthur.

== Club career ==
Burkart began his youth career with FC Zürich, before moving to the Manchester United youth academy in 2016. In 2019, he left Manchester United to join SC Freiburg II in Germany. He made his professional debut for SC Freiburg in the Bundesliga on 3 April 2021, coming on as a substitute in the 76th minute for Roland Sallai against Borussia Mönchengladbach. The away match finished as a 2–1 loss for Freiburg.

On 31 August 2022, Burkart moved on loan to Winterthur, with an option to buy. He permanently moved to the club in June 2023.

== International career ==
Burkart appeared for the Switzerland under-15 to under-20 youth national teams from 2014 to 2019. He is also eligible to represent England through his English mother.

== Personal life ==
Burkart was born in Aarau, Switzerland. Both of his parents were Olympic sprinters. His father, Stefan Burkart, was a Swiss sprinter and sports coach who specialised in the 60 metres and 100 metres. His personal bests of 6.61 seconds and 10.32 seconds are former Swiss records for the events. At the 1996 Summer Olympics, Stefan became the oldest ever sprinter to compete in the men's 100 metres at the Olympics. His English-born mother, Helen Barnett, represented Great Britain at the 1984 Summer Olympics in the 400 metres and Switzerland at the 1992 Summer Olympics.
