= John Myles-Mills =

Ghanaian sprinter (born 1966)

Personal information
- Born: John Myles-Mills; April 19, 1966 (age 60) Accra, Ghana
Medal record
Men's athletics
Representing Ghana
World Indoor Championships
Silver medal – second place	1989 Budapest	60 m
African Championships
Gold medal – first place	1988 Annaba	100 m
Silver medal – second place	1988 Annaba	4×100 m
Bronze medal – third place	1992 Belle Vue Harel	200 m

John Myles-Mills (born April 19, 1966) is a retired Ghanaian athlete who competed in the 100 and 200 metres. He represented Ghana at the Olympics in 1988 and 1992, being the country's flagbearer on both occasions. He also ran in the national relay team at both the 1987 and 1991 World Championships in Athletics. His teammates included Eric Akogyiram, Salaam Gariba and Emmanuel Tuffour, as well as Nelson Boateng on the Olympic team.

Myles-Mills competed for the George Mason Patriots track and field team in the NCAA.

His younger brother Leonard Myles-Mills was also a sprint athlete.

== International competitions ==
Year	Competition	Venue	Position	Event	Notes
Representing Ghana
1987	All-Africa Games	Nairobi, Kenya	2nd	200 m	20.94
1987	World Championships	Rome, Italy	7th (semis)	4 × 100 m relay	39.94
1988	African Championships	Annaba, Algeria	1st	100 m	10.25
1988	Olympic Games	Seoul, South Korea	8th (semis)	100 m	10.43
1988	Olympic Games	Seoul, South Korea	6th (q-finals)	200 m	20.95
1988	Olympic Games	Seoul, South Korea	5th (semis)	4 × 100 m relay	39.46
1989	World Indoor Championships	Budapest, Hungary	2nd	60 m	6.59
1991	Universiade	Sheffield, United Kingdom	11th (h)	4 × 100 m relay	41.69
1991	World Championships	Tokyo, Japan	7th (heats)	4 × 100 m relay	39.55
1992	African Championships	Belle Vue Maurel, Mauritius	3rd	200 m	21.31
1992	Olympic Games	Barcelona, Spain	5th (q-finals)	100 m	10.41
1992	Olympic Games	Barcelona, Spain	6th (semis)	4 × 100 m relay	39.28
1992	IAAF World Cup	Havana, Cuba	3rd	4 × 100 m relay	39.08
