= Patrick Stevens =

Belgian sprinter

Personal information
- Born: 31 January 1968 (age 58) Leut, Belgium

Sport
- Sport: Track and field
Medal record
Representing Belgium
European Championships
| Bronze medal – third place | 1994 Helsinki | 200 m |
Summer Universiade
| Bronze medal – third place | 1991 Sheffield | 200 m |
| Bronze medal – third place | 1991 Sheffield | 4x100m relay |

Patrick Stevens (born 31 January 1968) is a retired sprinter from Belgium. He won the bronze medal in the 200 metres at the 1994 European Championships in Helsinki and a silver medal in the 200 m at the 2000 European Indoor Championships. He earned selection for four consecutive Olympic Games for his native country, although he was unable to compete at Sydney 2000 due to injury. His best result was seventh in the famous Michael Johnson 1996 200m WR final in Atlanta. He has also competed in four World Championships, between 1993 and 1999, finishing eighth in the 1997 200 m final.

Stevens has a daughter called Lauryn with British athlete Denise Lewis.

== International competitions ==
| Year | Competition | Venue | Position | Event | Notes |
Representing Belgium
| 1987 | European Junior Championships | Birmingham, United Kingdom | 6th | 100 m | 10.64 |
| 1987 | European Junior Championships | Birmingham, United Kingdom | 7th | 200 m | 21.54 |
| 1988 | Olympic Games | Seoul, South Korea | 32nd (qf) | 100 m | 10.50 |
| 1988 | Olympic Games | Seoul, South Korea | 21st (qf) | 200 m | 20.94 |
| 1989 | European Indoor Championships | The Hague, Netherlands | 17th (h) | 60 m | 6.82 |
| 1989 | Universiade | Duisburg, West Germany | 7th | 100 m | 10.66 |
| 1989 | Universiade | Duisburg, West Germany | 7th (sf) | 200 m | 21.02 |
| 1990 | European Championships | Split, Yugoslavia | 11th (sf) | 100 m | 10.53 |
| 1990 | European Championships | Split, Yugoslavia | 7th | 200 m | 20.80 |
| 1991 | World Indoor Championships | Seville, Spain | 8th (sf) | 200 m | 21.33 |
| 1991 | Universiade | Sheffield, United Kingdom | 5th | 100 m | 10.40 |
| 1991 | Universiade | Sheffield, United Kingdom | 3rd | 200 m | 20.99 |
| 1991 | Universiade | Sheffield, United Kingdom | 3rd | 4 × 100 m | 40.05 |
| 1992 | Olympic Games | Barcelona, Spain | 31st (qf) | 100 m | 10.69 |
| 1992 | Olympic Games | Barcelona, Spain | 18th (qf) | 200 m | 20.67 |
| 1992 | World Cup | Havana, Cuba | 5th | 200 m | 20.81^{1} |
| 1993 | World Indoor Championships | Toronto, Canada | 6th | 200 m | 21.21 |
| 1993 | World Championships | Stuttgart, Germany | 26th (qf) | 200 m | 21.07 |
| 1994 | European Indoor Championships | Paris, France | 10th (sf) | 200 m | 22.11 |
| 1994 | European Championships | Helsinki, Finland | 13th (sf) | 100 m | 10.56 |
| 1994 | European Championships | Helsinki, Finland | 3rd | 200 m | 20.68 |
| 1995 | World Championships | Gothenburg, Sweden | 31st (qf) | 100 m | 10.42 |
| 1995 | World Championships | Gothenburg, Sweden | 16th (sf) | 200 m | 20.79 |
| 1996 | Olympic Games | Atlanta, United States | 24th (qf) | 100 m | 10.31 |
| 1996 | Olympic Games | Atlanta, United States | 7th | 200 m | 20.27 |
| 1997 | World Championships | Athens, Greece | 26th (qf) | 100 m | 10.31 |
| 1997 | World Championships | Athens, Greece | 8th | 200 m | 20.44 (w) |
| 1999 | World Championships | Seville, Spain | 22nd (qf) | 100 m | 10.23 |
| 1999 | World Championships | Seville, Spain | 9th (qf) | 200 m | 20.49^{2} |
| 2000 | European Indoor Championships | Ghent, Belgium | 31st (h) | 60 m | 6.78 |
| 2000 | European Indoor Championships | Ghent, Belgium | 2nd | 200 m | 20.70 |

^{1}Representing Europe

^{2}Did not start in the semifinals

== Personal bests ==
| Event | Time (seconds) | Venue | Date |
|---|---|---|---|
| 60 metres | 6.64 | Ghent, Belgium | 11 February 2000 |
| 100 metres | 10.14 | Oordegem, Belgium | 28 June 1997 |
| 200 metres | 20.19 | Rome, Italy | 5 June 1996 |
