= Jin Sun-kuk =

South Korean sprinter

Personal information
- Born: 25 October 1970 (age 55)

Sport
- Sport: Track and field
Medal record
Representing South Korea
East Asian Games
Gold medal – first place	1993 Shanghai	100 m

Jin Sun-Kuk (Korean: 진선국; RR: Jin Seonguk; born 25 October 1970) is a South Korean former track and field sprinter who competed in the 100 metres.

He represented his country at the 1996 Atlanta Olympics and the World Championships in Athletics in 1991 and 1993 (failing to pass beyond the first round on each occasion). He won the South Korean national title in the 100 m in 1997.

His personal best of 10.23 seconds came at the 1993 East Asian Games, which brought him the gold medal and a games record.
