= Michel Joubert =

Seychellois footballer

Personal information
- Date of birth: 3 September 1986 (age 40)
- Position: Striker

Senior career*
| Years | Team | Apps | (Gls) |
| 2008–2010 | Seychelles Fire Brigade | | |
| 2011 | The Lions FC | | |
| 2012 | Quincy FC | | |

International career
| 2008 | Seychelles | 4 | (0) |
- * Club domestic league appearances and goals

Michel Joubert (born 3 September 1986) is a retired Seychellois football striker.
