= Fletcher Wamilee =

Personal information
- Born: January 6, 1972 (age 54)
- Height: 1.72 m (5 ft 7 1/2 in)

Sport
- Country: Vanuatu
- Sport: Athletics
- Event: 100 metres

Fletcher Wambo Wamilee (born 6 January 1972) is a Vanuatuan sprinter.

Wamilee competed at the 1992 Summer Olympics held in Barcelona, he entered the 100 metres and ran a time of 11.41 seconds and finished 8th in his heat so didn't qualify for the next round.
