= Pat Kwok Wai =

Hong Kong sprinter

Personal information
- Nationality: Hong Konger
- Born: 11 January 1970 (age 56)

Chinese name
- Traditional Chinese: 畢國偉
- Simplified Chinese: 毕国伟
- Hanyu Pinyin: Bì Guówěi
- Yale Romanization: Bāt Gwok-wáih
- Jyutping: Bat^{1} Gwok^{3} Wai^{5}

Sport
- Sport: Sprinting
- Event: 200 metres

Pat Kwok Wai (born 11 January 1970) is a Hong Kong sprinter. He competed in the men's 200 metres at the 1992 Summer Olympics. Pat later became an athletics coach. He married fellow sprinter Wan Kin Yee in 2002.
