= Patrice Traoré Zeba =

Burkinabé sprinter

Personal information
- Nationality: Burkinabé
- Born: 31 January 1972 (age 54) Republic of Upper Volta

Sport
- Sport: Sprinting
- Event: 100 metres

Patrice Traoré Zeba (born 31 January 1972) is a Burkinabé sprinter. He competed in the men's 100 metres at the 1992 Summer Olympics.
