= Michael Joubert (sprinter) =

Australian sprinter

Personal information
- Nationality: Australian
- Born: 11 May 1970 (age 56) Durban, South Africa

Sport
- Sport: Sprinting
- Event: 400 metres

Michael Craig Joubert (born 11 May 1970 in Durban, South Africa) is an Australian sprinter. He competed in the men's 400 metres at the 1996 Summer Olympics.

Joubert competed for the Washington State Cougars track and field team in the NCAA.
