= Khalid Ibrahim Jouma =

Bahraini sprinter

Khalid Ibrahim Jouma (Arabic: خالد ابراهيم جمعة; born 25 December 1962) is a former Bahraini sprinter who competed in the men's 100m competition at the 1992 Summer Olympics. He recorded a 10.80, not enough to qualify for the next round past the heats. His personal best is 10.41, set in 1991. In 1992, he additionally ran the 200m, timed at 21.55. He also competed in the 1988 Summer Olympics in the 100m contest, clocked at 10.80.

In 1990, Jouma won the 1990 World Military Track and Field Championships in the 200 m with a time of 20.87 seconds. He also won the bronze medal in the 100 metres.
