= Dmitry Kliger =

Russian sprinter

Personal information
- Nationality: Russian
- Born: 14 April 1968 (age 58) Leningrad, Soviet Union

Sport
- Sport: Sprinting
- Event: 4 × 400 metres relay

Dmitry Viktorovich Kliger (Russian: Дми́трий Ви́кторович Кли́гер; born 14 April 1968) is a Russian sprinter. He competed in the men's 4 × 400 meters relay at the 1992 Summer Olympics.
