= Cameron Taylor =

New Zealand sprinter

Personal information
- Nationality: New Zealand
- Born: 3 June 1971 (age 55) Auckland, New Zealand
- Height: 183 cm (6 ft 0 in)
- Weight: 65 kg (143 lb)

Sport
- Sport: Sprinting
- Event: 200 metres

Cameron Phillip Taylor (born 3 June 1971) is a New Zealand sprinter.

== Career ==
A men's 200 metres sprinter, Taylor is best known for his appearances at the 1991 World Championships and the 1992 Summer Olympics. A New Zealand junior champion, Taylor was recruited as a sprinter to Southern Methodist University, where his most notable achievement was winning the 200 meters at the Southwest Conference Indoor Track and Field Championships in 1994 with a time of 22.09 seconds.

Following his retirement, Taylor became the chairman of the New Zealand board of athletics, while also working as a lawyer. He stepped down in 2025 and was awarded a life membership. He is now a director of Auckland Rugby.
