= Samuel Nchinda-Kaya =

Cameroonian sprinter

Sam Nchinda
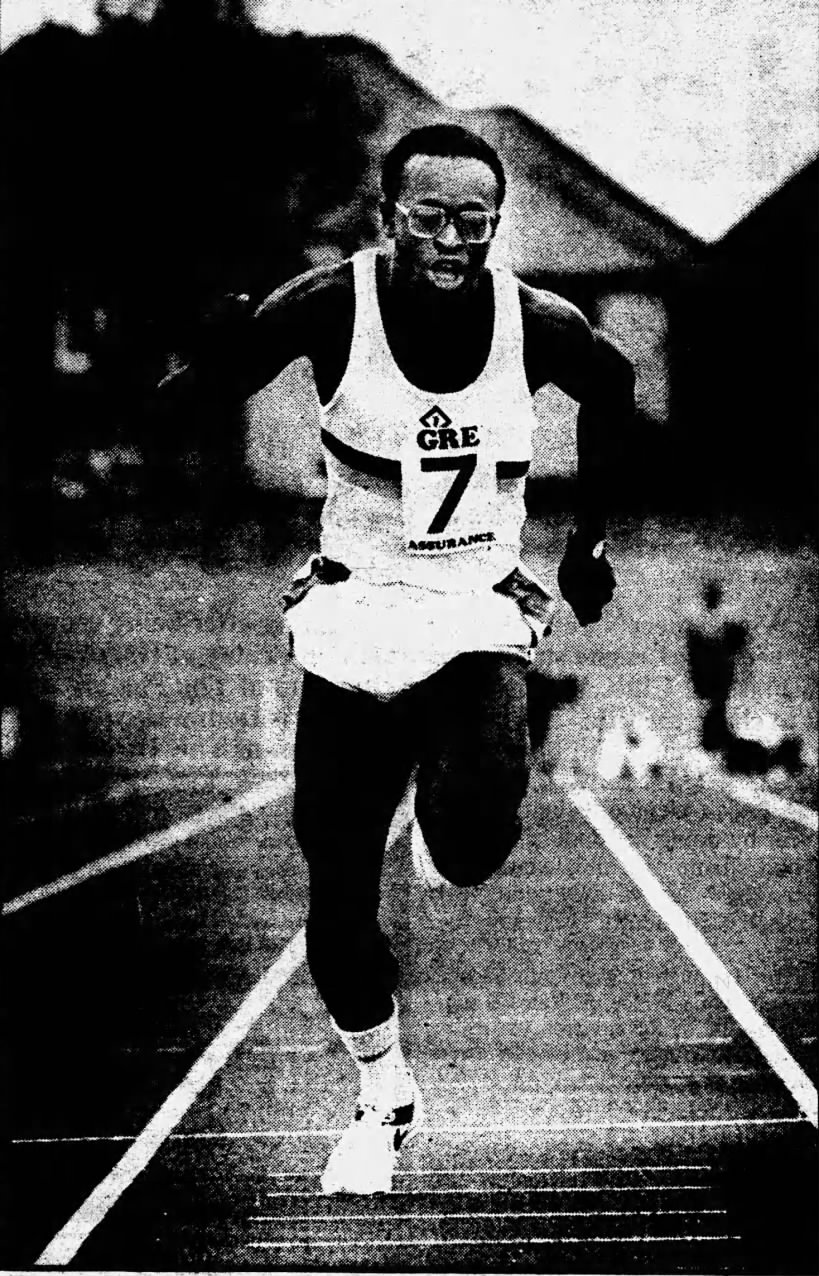
- Nchinda in 1988, competing for the Old Gaytonians

Personal information
- Full name: Samuel Nchinda-Kaya
- Nickname(s): Sparkling Sam; Slick Sam; Super Sam
- Born: 25 May 1967 (age 58) Cameroon
- Education: Harrow High School; London University

Sport
- Club: Old Gaytonians Athletic Club
- Coached by: Madeleine Cobb

Samuel Nchinda-Kaya (born 25 May 1967) is a former Cameroonian sprinter. He competed in the men's 100m and 200m competitions at the 1988 and 1992 Summer Olympics, reaching the semifinals in the 200m in 1988. He recorded a personal best of 10.24 seconds in the 100m in 1992. Nchinda-Kaya participated in various athletics meetings and championships, including the 1992 Résisprint International meeting and the 1992 and 1993 Swiss Athletics Championships. He was a member of the Harrow High School Old Gaytonians Athletic Club and ranked among the top British 100m sprinters in 1988. He set a Cameroonian national record in the 60 metres at the 1991 IAAF World Indoor Championships.

== Early life and education ==
Nchinda-Kaya studied at London University.

== Career ==
Nchinda-Kaya competed in the men's 100m competition at the 1992 Summer Olympics, recording a 10.41, enough to qualify for the next round past the heats, where he scored a 10.58. His personal best is 10.24, set in 1992. He also ran in the 200m, clocking in at 21.50.

In the 1988 Summer Olympics, he competed in the 100m and 200m as well, advancing to the semifinals in the latter. His performance was described as "respectable", noting that he had a poor start in the 100 m and was drawn next to the eventual bronze medalist Linford Christie.

Nchinda-Kaya won the 100 metres at the 1992 Résisprint International meeting in La Chaux-de-Fonds with a time of 10.24 seconds. He also finished 8th at the 1991 Athletissima Lausanne meeting and competed at the 1992 Weltklasse Zurich meeting.

== Achievements ==
Going by "Sparkling Sam", Nchinda-Kaya was a standout athlete for the Harrow High School Old Gaytonians Athletic Club, setting a top national time in the 4 × 100 metres relay. He won two sprint medals at the 1986 European Champion Clubs Cup for Juniors. In 1988, Nchinda-Kaya was the #7 ranked British 100 m sprinter and the top ranked athlete in any discipline from the London Borough of Harrow. In 1989, Nchinda-Kaya beat Olympic silver medalist Elliot Bunney at the GRE British League finals.

Nchinda-Kaya was also the 1998 CAU Inter-Counties and Southern champion in the 100 yards.

Nchinda-Kaya was the 1992 and 1993 Swiss Athletics Championships winner in the 100 metres, competing as a foreign national.

At the 1991 IAAF World Indoor Championships, Nchinda-Kaya competed in the 60 metres and qualified for the semifinals with a time of 6.76 seconds, a Cameroonian national record.
