= Marlin Cannon =

American sprinter

Personal information
- Born: December 9, 1970 (age 55) Oak Cliff, United States

Sport
- Sport: Track and field
Medal record
Representing United States
Summer Universiade
Gold medal – first place	1991 Sheffield	4x400 m relay
Bronze medal – third place	1991 Sheffield	400 m

Marlin Cannon (born December 9, 1970) is an American retired sprinter.
