= Tomohiro Osawa =

Japanese sprinter (1969–2016)

Personal information
- Nationality: Japanese
- Born: 2 April 1969 Saitama Prefecture, Japan
- Died: 6 April 2016 (aged 47) Tokyo, Japan

Sport
- Sport: Sprinting
- Event: 100 metres

Tomohiro Osawa (大沢 知宏, Ōsawa Tomohiro; 2 April 1969 – 6 April 2016) was a Japanese sprinter. While still a student at Waseda University, he competed in the men's 100 metres at the 1988 Summer Olympics, He worked as a coach at Waseda after graduation. He died of pancreatic cancer on 6 April 2016.
