= Boris Goins =

American sprinter (born 1967)

Personal information
- Born: April 7, 1967 (age 59) Tampa, Florida, United States

Sport
- Sport: Track and field
Medal record
Representing United States
Summer Universiade
Gold medal – first place	1991 Sheffield	4x100 m relay
Silver medal – second place	1991 Sheffield	100 m

Boris Goins (born April 7, 1967) is an American retired sprinter.

Goins competed for the Auburn Tigers track and field team in the NCAA.
