= Tim Hesse =

Ghanaian sprinter

Personal information
- Nationality: Ghanaian
- Born: 7 March 1968 (age 58)

Sport
- Sport: Sprinting
- Event: 400 metres

Tim Hesse (born 7 March 1968) is a Ghanaian sprinter. He competed in the men's 400 metres at the 1992 Summer Olympics, coming in 5th place in his heat and not qualifying for next round.

Hesse was also an All-American sprinter for the George Mason Patriots track and field team in the NCAA.
