= Mohamed Mehdi Hasan =

Bangladeshi sprinter

Personal information
- Nationality: Bangladeshi
- Born: 14 September 1971 (age 54)

Sport
- Sport: Sprinting
- Event: 400 metres

Mohamed Mehdi Hasan (born 14 September 1971) is a Bangladeshi sprinter. He competed in the men's 400 metres at the 1992 Summer Olympics.
