= Horace Dove-Edwin =

Sierra Leonean sprinter

Personal information
- Born: 10 February 1967 (age 59) Freetown, Sierra Leone

Sport
- Sport: Track and field
Medal record
Representing Sierra Leone
Summer Universiade
Silver medal – second place	1991 Sheffield	4x100m relay

Francis Horace Tipes Dove-Edwin (born 10 February 1967) is a retired Sierra Leonean sprinter who specialized in the 100 metres.

Participating in the 1988 Summer Olympics, he failed to make it through to the second round. In 1990 Dove-Edwin migrated to London together with his mother. His first major athletics event after his migration was the 1991 Summer Universiade held in Sheffield. At the 1992 Summer Olympics he competed in 200 metres, reaching the quarter-finals.

In 1994, Dove-Edwin won a surprising silver medal in 100 metres at the Commonwealth Games, behind the expected winner Linford Christie but ahead of Michael Green and Frankie Fredericks, becoming the first medal winner in athletics for Sierra Leone. However, a few days later as Dove-Edwin prepared to run in the semi-final heat of the 4 x 100 metres relay event, he learned that the doping test sample he had delivered after the 100 metres final contained traces of the banned substance stanozolol. He was given a two-year ban by the IAAF and stripped of the medal, whereas Green was promoted to silver medallist and Fredericks to bronze medallist. Commenting on the suspension in retrospect in 2002, Dove-Edwin stated that he "was a victim of circumstances and a procedure that was full of flaws", and that he "never took steroids or anything".

During his suspension from active athletics he worked briefly as a trainee assistant coach for the Saudi Arabian 1996 Summer Olympics team. Dove-Edwin returned to compete at the 1997 World Championships in Athens, but with 10.65 seconds he failed to progress from heat 8 in what turned out to be his last international competition. His personal best 100 metres time, achieved before the 1994 Commonwealth Games, was 10.14 seconds.

In the meantime Dove-Edwin had moved to the United States to escape the negative publicity in England. He graduated from California State University, Chico in May 1999 with an MA degree in Exercise Science.

== See also ==
- List of sportspeople sanctioned for doping offences
