= Charles-Louis Seck =

Senegalese sprinter

Personal information
- Nationality: Senegalese
- Born: 11 May 1965 (age 61)

Sport
- Sport: Track and Field
- Event: Athletics

Achievements and titles
- Personal bests: 60 metres: 6.56 (1987); 100 metres: 10.19 (1986)
Medal record
Men's athletics
Representing Senegal
African Championships
Silver medal – second place	1984 Rabat	100 m
Silver medal – second place	1985 Cairo	100 m
Silver medal – second place	1988 Annaba	100 m
Silver medal – second place	1990 Cairo	4×100 m
Silver medal – second place	1992 Belle Vue Harel	100 m
Silver medal – second place	1992 Belle Vue Harel	4×100 m
Bronze medal – third place	1984 Rabat	4×100 m
Bronze medal – third place	1988 Annaba	4×100 m
Bronze medal – third place	1990 Cairo	100 m
All-Africa Games
Bronze medal – third place	1987 Nairobi	100 m

Charles-Louis Seck (born 11 May 1965) is a retired Senegalese sprinter and three-time Olympian who competed in the 100 metres.

== Achievements ==
Year	Competition	Venue	Position	Event	Notes
Representing Senegal
1984	Olympics	Los Angeles, U.S.	23rd (qf)	100 m	10.54
1984	African Championships	Rabat, Morocco	2nd	100 m	10.49
1985	African Championships	Cairo, Egypt	2nd	100 m	10.37
1987	All-Africa Games	Nairobi, Kenya	3rd	100 m	10.33
1988	African Championships	Annaba, Algeria	2nd	100 m	10.29
1988	Olympics	Seoul, South Korea	19th (qf)	100 m	10.42
1990	African Championships	Cairo, Egypt	3rd	100 m	10.38
1992	African Championships	Belle Vue Maurel, Mauritius	2nd	100 m	10.40
1992	Olympics	Barcelona, Spain	60th (h)	100 m	10.57
