= Philip Harries =

British athlete (born 2005)

Personal information
- Nationality: British (English)
- Born: 7 April 1966 (age 60) Holbrook, Derbyshire, England
- Height: 183 cm (6 ft 0 in)
- Weight: 88 kg (194 lb)

Sport
- Sport: Athletics; Bobsleigh
- Event: 400m hurdles
- Club: Derby & County AC

Philip James Charles Harries (born 7 April 1966) is a British athlete who competed at the 1988 Summer Olympics in 400m hurdles and at the 2002 Winter Olympics in bobsleigh.

== Biography ==
He grew up in Allestree. Harries was UK junior champion in the 400m hurdles event in 1985. He also competed at the 1994 Commonwealth Games in Victoria, Canada for Wales in the 400m hurdles event and was the Welsh record holder in that event from 1988 to 1999.

Harries finished second behind Max Robertson at the 1988 AAA Championships. and also represented Great Britain at the 1989 and 1991 World Student Games (Universiade) in Duisburg and Sheffield in the 400m hurdles (1989) and the 200m and 4 × 100 m relay (1991).

As a 400m hurdler he represented Great Britain at the 1988 Olympic Games in Seoul, South Korea, finishing fifth in his heat.

== Bobsleigh ==
Fourteen years after competing in the Summer Olympics, he represented Great Britain at the 2002 Winter Olympic games in Salt Lake City, USA in the 4 man bobsleigh event, finishing in 14th place in the GB2 sled. Harries also spent 3 seasons competing for GB in the FIBT Bobsleigh World Cup.
