= Stefan Burkart =

Swiss sports coach and former sprinter (1957–2020)

Stefan Burkart (9 December 1957 – 3 May 2020) was a Swiss sprinter and sports coach who specialised in the 60 metres and 100 metres. His personal bests of 6.61 seconds and 10.32 seconds are former Swiss records for the events.

He competed for Switzerland at the Summer Olympics in 1992 and 1996 – at the latter edition he became the oldest ever sprinter to compete in the men's 100 metres at the Olympics. He represented his country at the European Athletics Championships on three occasions (1982, 1990 and 1994) and also ran at the 1995 World Championships in Athletics. He had his best international performances indoors, reaching the semi-finals at the 1985 IAAF World Indoor Games and at the 1986 European Athletics Indoor Championships (in his career he raced twice more at the latter competition).

In the mid-1990s he moved towards bobsleigh and competed in European and World level events. As a coach he led three athletes to Winter Olympics medals: Thomas Lamparter, Martin Annen, and Gregor Stähli.

== Biography ==
=== Early life ===
Burkart became interested in track and field upon seeing the 1968 Mexico Olympics on television when he was a child. A recreational drug user in his youth, he travelled widely in his early twenties and converted to Scientology after visiting one of their academies in Sacramento, California. Following his conversion he returned to Switzerland and renewed his focus on sprinting. He made his first international appearance for his country at an indoor international match against Sweden in 1981.

=== Sprint career ===
He claimed his first Swiss national title in 1982, sharing the 100 m title with the more established Franco Fähndrich in a time of 10.47 seconds. This led to his selection for the 1982 European Athletics Championships, where he was a 100 m semi-finalist. He ran a personal best of 10.42 in the 1983 season. He took his first win at the Swiss Indoor Championships in 1985, taking the national title in the 60 metres – he went on to win eight consecutive Swiss titles from 1985 to 1991. He made his global debut at the 1985 IAAF World Indoor Games and was a semi-finalist after having set a personal best of 6.66 seconds in the first round. He competed in the event at the 1985 European Athletics Indoor Championships a few months later but did not progress beyond his first race. The highlights of his 1986 season were a 60 m lifetime best and Swiss record of 6.61 seconds and a semi-final placing in the event at the 1986 European Athletics Indoor Championships. That year he married Helen Barnett, a fellow sprinter and British Olympian.

Burkart missed the opportunity to run at the 1988 Seoul Olympics due to an injury, but rebounded with a personal best of 10.39 seconds in 1989. That same year he won the 100 m "B" final section at the 1989 European Cup. He represented Switzerland at the 1990 European Athletics Indoor Championships and the 1990 European Athletics Championships and knocked a further hundredth off his 100 m best that year. He failed to make it out of the 60 m heats at the 1992 European Athletics Indoor Championships but had the best outdoor season of his career, setting a 100 m best and Swiss national record of 10.32 seconds as well as a 200 metres best of 20.76 seconds. This earned him his Olympic debut at the age of 34 and he was a quarter-finalist in both the sprints. He qualified for the 1993 World Championships in Athletics the following year, but did not start due to injury.

Burkart reached the quarter-finals of the 100 m at the 1994 European Athletics Championships and matched that feat at the 1995 World Championships in Athletics. He also won the "C" final section at the 1994 European Cup. In 1996 he claimed his tenth Swiss title in the 60 m and his ninth title in the 100 m. He also qualified for his second Olympics at the 1996 Atlanta Games. He failed to make it past the first round but he became the oldest male athlete ever to compete in the 100 metres at the Olympics. After that season he largely retired from athletics, but made further appearances at the Swiss Indoor Championships, competing in 1999 and finally in 2002. He also won the 100 m in the over-40s division at the 2002 European Veterans Athletics Championships.

=== Bobsled and coaching career ===
Burkart was approached by Swiss bobsledder Christian Meili and sprinter-turned-bobsledder René Mangold in 1995 and they urged him to try out the winter sport. He competed in the Swiss team in 4-man bobsleigh at the Bobsleigh European Championship and Bobsleigh World Cup from 1998 to 2002.

Burkart soon began to focus on training younger bobsledders and athletes in the late 1990s with Fredi Steinmann. Among his training group were Olympic bobsleigh bronze medallists Thomas Lamparter and Martin Annen, as well as skeleton specialist and Olympic medallist Gregor Stähli. Burkart also coached Daniel Dubois and Andreas Baumann, both of whom represented Switzerland in the indoor 60 m sprint which had been Burkart's speciality.

== Personal life ==
Brukart was married to Helen Barnett, who represented Great Britain at the 1984 Olympics and Switzerland at the 1992 Olympics. Their son Nishan Burkart is a footballer and a youth international with the Switzerland national under-20 football team. Stefan Burkart died in 2020 after a long illness.

== Competition record ==
National titles

- 60 metres (indoors): 1985–1992, 1995–1996 (10)
- 100 metres (outdoors): 1982, 1985–1990, 1995–1996 (9)

== Personal bests ==
- 60 metres – 6.61 (1986)
- 100 metres – 10.32 (1992)
- 200 metres – 20.76 (1992)
