= Athletics at the 1991 Summer Universiade =

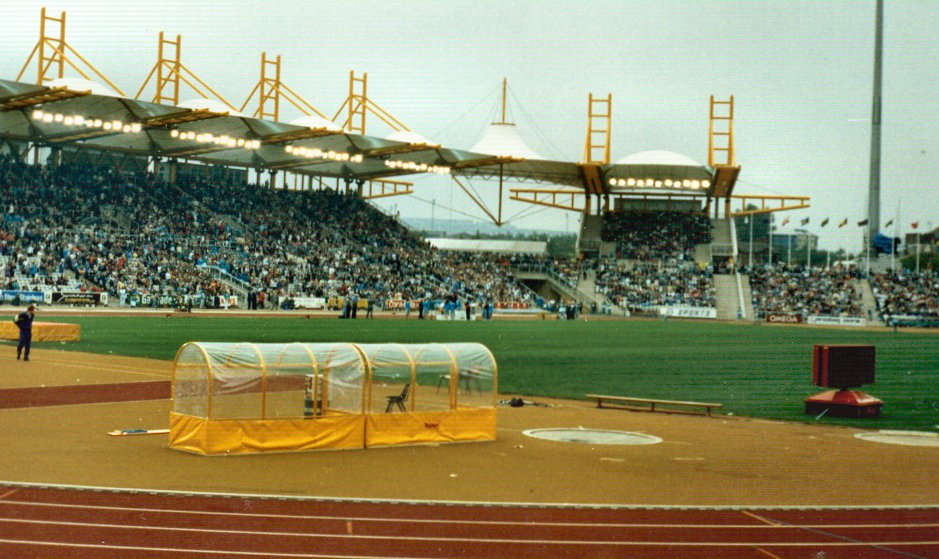
- The host stadium during the 1991 Summer Universiade
- Dates: July 19 – 25, 1991
- Host city: Sheffield; United Kingdom
- Venue: Don Valley Stadium
- Events: 43
- Records set: 6 Games records

At the 1991 Summer Universiade, the athletics events were held at the Don Valley Stadium in Sheffield in the United Kingdom from July 19–25. A total of 43 events were contested, of which 23 by male and 20 by female athletes.

Performances were of a high standard, particularly in the men's competition, with 6 Games records broken, with 1988 Olympic silver medalist Hollis Conway jumping 2.37 m in the high jump and home favourite Steve Backley throwing 87.42m in the javelin, both performances that remain Universiade records to this day. Future Olympic champion Derrick Adkins won the 400 metre hurdles.

The United States easily topped the medal table with fifteen gold medals and 31 medals in total. The Soviet Union won the next highest number of events, with six gold medallists, and 20 total medals. Great Britain, the host nation, came joint-third in the medal table with two gold medals and nine medals in total. Twenty-eight nations reached the medal table in the athletics competition.

== Medal summary ==
=== Men ===
Event	Gold		Silver		Bronze	
100 metres (wind: 0.0 m/s)	Michael Bates (USA)	10.17	Boris Goins (USA)	10.34	Steve Gookey (GBR)	10.39
200 metres (wind: +1.0 m/s)	Jon Drummond (USA)	20.58	Daniel Phillip (NGR)	20.69	Patrick Stevens (BEL)	20.99
400 metres	Patrick O'Connor (JAM)	45.52	Benyounès Lahlou (MAR)	45.55	Marlin Cannon (USA)	45.78
800 metres	Giuseppe D'Urso (ITA)	1:46.82	Dean Kenneally (AUS) Curtis Robb (GBR)	1:46.88	Not awarded	
1500 metres	Niall Bruton (IRL)	3:50.69	Davide Tirelli (ITA)	3:50.79	Juan Viudes (ESP)	3:51.22
5000 metres	John Mayock (GBR)	13:39.25	David Evans (AUS) Peter Sherry (USA)	13:39.31	Not awarded	
10,000 metres	Stephan Freigang (GER)	28:15.84 GR	Ryuki Takei (JPN)	28:17.02	Mogambi Otwori (KEN)	28:18.91
110 metres hurdles	Elbert Ellis (USA)	13.83	Jerry Roney (USA)	13.83	Dmitriy Buldov (URS)	13.85
400 metres hurdles	Derrick Adkins (USA)	49.01	Yoshihiko Saito (JPN)	50.02	Oleg Tverdokhleb (URS)	50.09
3000 metres steeplechase	Shaun Creighton (AUS)	8:32.30	Akira Nakamura (JPN)	8:33.50	Gavin Gaynor (USA)	8:34.21
4 × 100 metres relay	United States (USA); Jon Drummond; Boris Goins; Michael Bates; James Trapp	39.10	Sierra Leone (SLE); Joselyn Thomas; Horace Dove-Edwin; Benjamin Grant; Sanusi Turay	39.88	Belgium (BEL); David Branle; Jeroen Fischer; Stefaan Allemeersch; Patrick Stevens	40.05
4 × 400 metres relay	United States (USA); Chuck Wilson; Marlin Cannon; Brian Irvin; Gabriel Luke	3:03.65	Jamaica (JAM); Linval Laird; Evon Clarke; Howard Davis; Patrick O'Connor	3:05.93	Italy (ITA); Marcello Pantone; Gianrico Boncompagni; Riccardo Cardone; Vito Petrella	3:07.54
Marathon	Hwang Young-Jo (KOR)	2:12:40 GR	Kenjiru Jitsui (JPN)	2:14:22	Choi Hyong-Chol (PRK)	2:17:45
20 kilometres walk	Robert Korzeniowski (POL)	1:24:37	Jaime Barroso (ESP)	1:25:01	Arturo Di Mezza (ITA)	1:25:09
High jump	Hollis Conway (USA)	2.37 m GR	Arturo Ortiz (ESP)	2.31 m	Yuriy Sergiyenko (URS)	2.25 m
Pole vault	István Bagyula (HUN)	5.80 m GR	Bill Payne (USA)	5.60 m	Pyotr Bochkaryov (URS)	5.60 m
Long jump	Alan Turner (USA)	8.18 m (w)	George Ogbeide (NGR)	8.08 m	Bogdan Tudor (ROM)	8.01 m
Triple jump	Brian Wellman (BER)	17.07 m	Chen Yanping (CHN)	16.97 m	Wu Lijun (CHN)	16.72 m (w)
Shot put	Aleksandr Klimenko (URS)	19.35 m	Matt Simson (GBR)	19.07 m	Jordan Reynolds (USA)	19.01 m
Discus throw	Adewale Olukoju (NGR)	61.48 m	Anthony Washington (USA)	61.46 m	Alexis Elizalde (CUB)	59.04 m
Hammer throw	Ken Flax (USA)	76.46 m	Valeriy Gubkin (URS)	76.28 m	Heinz Weis (GER)	75.62 m
Javelin throw	Steve Backley (GBR)	87.42 m GR	Vladimir Ovchinnikov (URS)	80.60 m	Knut Hempel (GER)	77.90 m
Decathlon	Steve Fritz (USA)	7874 pts	Kris Szabadhegy (USA)	7719 pts	Anthony Brannen (GBR)	7656 pts

=== Women ===
Event	Gold		Silver		Bronze	
100 metres (wind: +1.6 m/s)	Chryste Gaines (USA)	11.56	Anita Howard (USA)	11.57	Sølvi Olsen (NOR)	11.61
200 metres (wind: +1.6 m/s)	Wang Huei-Chen (TPE)	23.22	Sølvi Olsen (NOR)	23.41	Michelle Collins (USA)	23.47
400 metres	Maicel Malone (USA)	50.65	Gretha Tromp (NED)	52.06	Galina Moskvina (URS)	52.34
800 metres	Inna Yevseyeva (URS)	1:59.80	Gabi Lesch (GER)	2:00.97	Jasmin Jones (USA)	2:02.00
1500 metres	Sonia O'Sullivan (IRL)	4:12.14	Iulia Besliu (ROM)	4:12.24	Qu Yunxia (CHN)	4:12.43
3000 metres	Iulia Besliu (ROM)	8:55.42	Sonia O'Sullivan (IRL)	8:56.35	Zita Ágoston (HUN)	9:01.09
10,000 metres	Anne Marie Letko (USA)	32:36.87	Suzana Ćirić (YUG)	32:37.94	Olga Nazarkina (URS)	32:40.83
100 metres hurdles (wind: +1.6 m/s)	Marina Azyabina (URS)	12.95	Mary Cobb (USA)	13.19	Keri Maddox (GBR)	13.32
400 metres hurdles	Gretha Tromp (NED)	55.30	Nicoleta Carutasu (ROM)	56.07	Anna Chuprina (URS)	56.74
4 × 100 metres relay	United States (USA); Andrea James; Tamela Saldana; Chryste Gaines; Anita Howard	44.45	Great Britain (GBR); Rachel Kirby; Louise Stuart; Melanie Neef; Christine Bloomfield	44.97	Italy (ITA); Annarita Balzani; Laura Galligani; Cristina Picchi; Lara Sinico	45.24
4 × 400 metres relay	United States (USA); Keisha Demas; Tasha Downing; Teri Smith; Maicel Malone	3:27.93	Soviet Union (URS); Yelena Golesheva; Inna Yevseyeva; Galina Moskvina; Anna Knoroz	3:29.64	Poland (POL); Barbara Grzywocz; Agata Sadurska; Monika Warnicka; Sylwia Pachut	3:35.03
Marathon	Miyako Iwai (JPN)	2:36:27	Kim Yen-Ku (KOR)	2:37:58	Mariya Doskoch (URS)	2:38:48
10 kilometres walk	Sari Essayah (FIN)	44:04	Chen Yueling (CHN)	44:33	Annarita Sidoti (ITA)	45:10
High jump	Alison Inverarity (AUS)	1.92 m	Svetlana Lavrova (URS)	1.92 m	Tisha Waller (USA)	1.90 m
Long jump	Inessa Kravets (URS)	6.87 m	Fiona May (GBR)	6.67 m	Yelena Khlopotnova (URS)	6.66 m (w)
Triple jump	Li Huirong (CHN)	14.20 m GR	Yelena Semiraz (URS)	13.75 m	Li Jing (CHN)	13.63 m (w)
Shot put	Svetlana Krivelyova (URS)	19.62 m	Zhou Tianhua (CHN)	19.23 m	Agnes Deselaers (GER)	17.32 m
Discus throw	Xiao Yanling (CHN)	64.36 m	Qiu Qiaoping (CHN)	62.40 m	Antonina Patoka (URS)	62.22 m
Javelin throw(old model)	Tatyana Shikolenko (URS)	63.56 m	Isel López (CUB)	62.32 m	Paula Berry (USA)	58.28 m
Heptathlon	Birgit Clarius (GER)	6419 pts	Urszula Włodarczyk (POL)	6319 pts	Maria Kamrowska (POL)	6279 pts

== Medal table ==
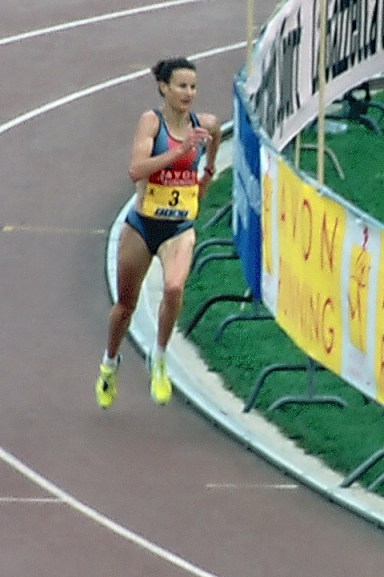
Sonia O'Sullivan of Ireland won Gold in the 1500m and Silver in the 3000m.

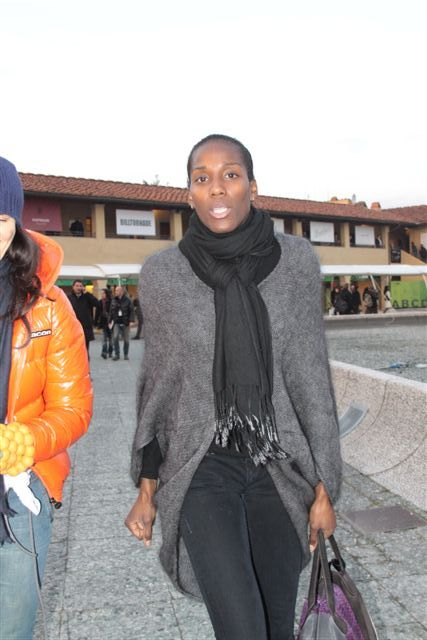
1995 Long jump World Champion Fiona May won silver for Great Britain.

* Host nation (Great Britain)

Rank	Nation	Gold	Silver	Bronze	Total
1	United States	15	8	8	31
2	Soviet Union	6	5	10	21
3	China	2	4	3	9
3	Great Britain*	2	4	3	9
5	Australia	2	2	0	4
6	Germany	2	1	3	6
7	Ireland	2	1	0	3
8	Japan	1	4	0	5
9	Romania	1	2	1	4
10	Nigeria	1	2	0	3
11	Italy	1	1	4	6
12	Poland	1	1	2	4
13	Jamaica	1	1	0	2
13	Netherlands	1	1	0	2
13	South Korea	1	1	0	2
16	Hungary	1	0	1	2
17	Bermuda	1	0	0	1
17	Chinese Taipei	1	0	0	1
17	Finland	1	0	0	1
20	Spain	0	2	1	3
21	Cuba	0	1	1	2
21	Norway	0	1	1	2
23	Morocco	0	1	0	1
23	Sierra Leone	0	1	0	1
23	Yugoslavia	0	1	0	1
26	Belgium	0	0	2	2
27	Kenya	0	0	1	1
27	North Korea	0	0	1	1
Totals (28 entries)		43	45	42	130

== See also ==
- 1991 in the sport of athletics
- FISU World University Games
- University and college sport
