= List of men's Olympic and World Championship athletics sprint champions =

This is a list of the men's athletics champions at the Olympics and World Championships in the sprint events since the introduction of the World Championships in 1983. Combining the lists of global champions into a single timeline allows patterns of success and dominance to be demonstrated, as well as highlighting the occasional shock results.

== List of champions ==
Each entry has an asterisk (*) linking to the championship of that year. Yellow background is for Olympic races.

Year	100 m	200 m	400 m	4 × 100 m	4 × 400 m
1983	(United States) Lewis*	(United States) Smith*	(United States) Cameron*	(United States) King, Gault, Smith, Lewis*	(Soviet Union) Lovachov, Troshchilo, Chernetskiy, Markin*
1984	(United States) Lewis*	(United States) Lewis*	(United States) Babers*	(United States) Graddy, Brown, Smith, Lewis*	(United States) Nix, Armstead, Babers, McKay*
1987	(United States) Lewis*	(United States) Smith*	(East Germany) Schönlebe*	(United States) McRae, McNeill, Glance, Lewis*	(United States) Everett, Haley, McKay, Reynolds*
1988	(United States) Lewis*	(United States) DeLoach*	(United States) S.Lewis*	(Soviet Union) Bryzhin, Krylov, Muravyov, Savin*	(United States) Everett, S.Lewis, Robinzine, Reynolds*
1991	(United States) Lewis*	(United States) Johnson*	(United States) Pettigrew*	(United States) Cason, Burrell, Mitchell, Lewis*	(United Kingdom) Black, Redmond, Regis, Akabusi*
1992	(United Kingdom) Christie*	(United States) Marsh*	(United States) Watts*	(United States) Marsh, Burrell, Mitchell, Lewis*	(United States) Valmon, Watts, Johnson, S.Lewis*
1993	(United Kingdom) Christie*	(Namibia) Fredericks*	(United States) Johnson*	(United States) Drummond, Cason, Mitchell, Burrell*	(United States) Valmon, Watts, Reynolds, Johnson*
1995	(Canada) Bailey*	(United States) Johnson*	(United States) Johnson*	(Canada) Bailey, Esmie, Gilbert, Surin*	(United States) Ramsey, Mills, Reynolds, Johnson*
1996	(Canada) Bailey*	(United States) Johnson*	(United States) Johnson*	(Canada) Esmie, Gilbert, Surin, Bailey*	(United States) L.Smith, Harrison, Mills, Maybank*
1997	(United States) Greene*	(Trinidad and Tobago) Boldon*	(United States) Johnson*	(Canada) Esmie, Gilbert, Surin, Bailey*	(United Kingdom) Thomas, Black, Baulch, Richardson*
1999	(United States) Greene*	(United States) Greene*	(United States) Johnson*	(United States) Drummond, Montgomery, B.Lewis, Greene*	(Poland) Czubak, Maćkowiak, Bocian, Haczek*
2000	(United States) Greene*	(Greece) Kenteris*	(United States) Johnson*	(United States) Drummond, Williams, B.Lewis, Greene*	(Nigeria) Chukwu, Monye, Bada, Udo-Obong*
2001	(United States) Greene*	(Greece) Kenteris*	(United States) Moncur*	(South Africa) Nagel, Du Plessis, Newton, Quinn*	(The Bahamas) Moncur, Brown, McIntosh, Munnings*
2003	(Saint Kitts and Nevis) Collins*	(United States) Capel*	(United States) Washington*	(United States) Capel, Williams, Patton, J.Johnson*	(France) Djhone, Keïta, Diagana, Raquil*
2004	(United States) Gatlin*	(United States) Crawford*	(United States) Wariner*	(United Kingdom) Gardener, Campbell, Devonish, Lewis-Francis*	(United States) Harris, Brew, Wariner, Williamson*
2005	(United States) Gatlin*	(United States) Gatlin*	(United States) Wariner*	(France) Doucouré, Pognon, De Lépine, Dovy*	(United States) Rock, Brew, Williamson, Wariner*
2007	(United States) Gay*	(United States) Gay*	(United States) Wariner*	(United States) Patton, Spearmon, Gay, Dixon*	(United States) Merritt, Taylor, Williamson, Wariner*
2008	(Jamaica) Bolt*	(Jamaica) Bolt*	(United States) Merritt*	(Trinidad and Tobago) Bledman, Burns, Callender, Thompson*	(United States) Merritt, Taylor, Neville, Wariner*
2009	(Jamaica) Bolt*	(Jamaica) Bolt*	(United States) Merritt*	(Jamaica) Mullings, Frater, Bolt, Powell*	(United States) Taylor, Wariner, Clement, Merritt*
2011	(Jamaica) Blake*	(Jamaica) Bolt*	(Grenada) James*	(Jamaica) Carter, Frater, Blake, Bolt*	(United States) Nixon, Jackson, Taylor, Merritt*
2012	(Jamaica) Bolt*	(Jamaica) Bolt*	(Grenada) James*	(Jamaica) Carter, Frater, Blake, Bolt*	(The Bahamas) Brown, Pinder, Mathieu, Miller*
2013	(Jamaica) Bolt*	(Jamaica) Bolt*	(United States) Merritt*	(Jamaica) Carter, Bailey-Cole, Ashmeade, Bolt*	(United States) Verburg, McQuay, A.Hall, Merritt*
2015	(Jamaica) Bolt*	(Jamaica) Bolt*	(South Africa) van Niekerk*	(Jamaica) Carter, Powell, Ashmeade, Bolt*	(United States) Verburg, McQuay, Nellum, Merritt*
2016	(Jamaica) Bolt*	(Jamaica) Bolt*	(South Africa) van Niekerk*	(Jamaica) Powell, Blake, Ashmeade, Bolt*	(United States) A.Hall, McQuay, Roberts, Merritt*
2017	(United States) Gatlin*	(Turkey) Guliyev*	(South Africa) van Niekerk*	(United Kingdom) Ujah, Gemili, Talbot, Mitchell-Blake*	(Trinidad and Tobago) Solomon, Richards, Cedenio, Gordon*
2019	(United States) Coleman*	(United States) Lyles*	(The Bahamas) Gardiner*	(United States) Coleman, Gatlin, Rodgers, Lyles*	(United States) Kerley, Cherry, London, Benjamin*
2020	(Italy) Jacobs*	(Canada) De Grasse*	(The Bahamas) Gardiner*	(Italy) Patta, Jacobs, Desalu, Tortu*	(United States) Cherry, Norman, Deadmon, Benjamin*
2022	(United States) Kerley*	(United States) Lyles*	(United States) Norman*	(Canada) Brown, Blake, Rodney, De Grasse*	(United States) Godwin, Norman, Deadmon, Allison*
2023	(United States) Lyles*	(United States) Lyles*	(Jamaica) Watson*	(United States) Coleman, Kerley, Carnes, Lyles*	(United States) Q.Hall, Norwood, Robinson, Benjamin*
2024	(United States) Lyles*	(Botswana) Tebogo*	(United States) Q.Hall*	(Canada) Brown, Blake, Rodney, De Grasse*	(United States) Bailey, Norwood, Deadmon, Benjamin*
2025	(Jamaica) Seville*	(United States) Lyles*	(Botswana) Kebinatshipi*	(United States) Coleman, Bednarek, Lindsey, Lyles*	(Botswana) Eppie, Tebogo, Ndori, Kebinatshipi*

== Gold medal leaders ==
The top gold medallists since 1983 in these events are:

Rank	Athlete	Total	100 m	200 m	400 m	4 × 100 m	4 × 400 m
1	(Jamaica) Usain Bolt	19	6	7	0	6	0
2	(United States) Michael Johnson	12	0	3	6	0	3
3	(United States) Carl Lewis	11	5	1	0	5	0
4	(United States) LaShawn Merritt	10	0	0	3	0	7
5	(United States) Noah Lyles	9	2	4	0	3	0
6	(United States) Jeremy Wariner	8	0	0	3	0	5
7	(United States) Maurice Greene	7	4	1	0	2	0
8	(United States) Vernon Norwood	6	0	0	0	0	6****
9	(United States) Justin Gatlin	5	3	1	0	1	0
9	(Canada) Donovan Bailey	5	2	0	0	3	0
9	(Jamaica) Nesta Carter	5	0	0	0	5	0
12	(Jamaica) Yohan Blake	4	1	0	0	3	0
12	(United States) Calvin Smith	4	0	2	0	2	0
12	(Jamaica) Michael Frater	4	0	0	0	4	0
12	(Jamaica) Asafa Powell	4	0	0	0	4	0
12	(United States) Butch Reynolds	4	0	0	0	0	4
12	(United States) Angelo Taylor	4	0	0	0	0	4
12	(United States) Rai Benjamin	4	0	0	0	0	4

**** including four gold medals in the relay events in which he participated in the heats only.

== General references ==
- International Olympic Committee results database
- Olympic listings from IAAF 2013 statistical handbook
- IAAF World Championships in Athletics. GBR Athletics. Retrieved on 2016-08-20.
