= 1993 IAAF World Indoor Championships – Men's 60 metres =

The men's 60 metres event at the 1993 IAAF World Indoor Championships was held on 12 March.

== Medalists ==
Gold	Silver	Bronze
Bruny Surin; Canada	Frankie Fredericks; Namibia	Talal Mansour; Qatar

== Results ==
=== Heats ===
First 2 of each heat (Q) and next 4 fastest (q) qualified for the semifinals.

Rank	Heat	Name	Nationality	Time	Notes
1	3	Bruny Surin	Canada	6.59	Q
2	6	Frankie Fredericks	Namibia	6.60	Q
3	4	Talal Mansour	Qatar	6.61	Q
4	4	Jon Drummond	United States	6.63	Q
5	5	Jason John	Great Britain	6.65	Q
6	6	Dennis Mitchell	United States	6.68	Q
7	5	Andrés Simón	Cuba	6.69	Q
8	3	Daniel Cojocaru	Romania	6.72	Q
8	5	Sanusi Turay	Sierra Leone	6.72	q
10	2	Joel Isasi	Cuba	6.73	Q
10	3	Alexandros Terzian	Greece	6.73	q
10	4	Kennet Kjensli	Norway	6.73	q
10	5	Aleksandr Porkhomovskiy	Russia	6.73	q
14	3	Olivier Théophile	France	6.74	
14	6	Jiří Valík	Czech Republic	6.74	
16	2	Derrick Sutherland	Canada	6.75	Q
16	3	Juan Jesús Trapero	Spain	6.75	
16	4	Stefano Tilli	Italy	6.75	
19	1	Johann Venter	South Africa	6.76	Q, NR
20	2	Alexandros Yenovelis	Greece	6.77	
21	1	Emmanuel Tuffour	Ghana	6.78	Q
21	6	Hisatsugu Suzuki	Japan	6.78	
23	2	Vitaliy Savin	Kazakhstan	6.79	
24	1	Ibrahim Meité	Ivory Coast	6.82	
25	1	Damien Marsh	Australia	6.83	
26	2	Raymond Stewart	Jamaica	6.85	
27	5	Anvar Kuchmuradov	Uzbekistan	6.86	
28	2	Shinji Aoto	Japan	6.87	
29	6	Sa'ad Marzouk	Kuwait	6.89	NR
30	1	Stephen Lewis	Montserrat	6.91	NR
30	4	Boevi Menelik Lawson	Togo	6.91	
32	3	Claus Hirsbro	Denmark	6.93	
33	3	Einar Þór Einarsson	Iceland	6.95	
34	1	Miguel Janssen	Aruba	6.97	NR
35	5	Driss Bensadou	Morocco	6.98	
36	4	Cengiz Kavaklıoğlu	Turkey	6.99	
37	6	Donovan Powell	Jamaica	7.02	
38	1	Sergey Lopatkin	Azerbaijan	7.07	
39	1	Moussa Savadogo	Mali	7.14	NR
40	5	Guillermo Saucedo	Bolivia	7.27	
41	2	Valentin Ngbogo	Central African Republic	7.29	
	2	Oumar Loum	Senegal	DNS	
	4	Charles-Louis Seck	Senegal	DNS	
	4	Kastytis Klimas	Lithuania	DNS	
	5	Obinna Eregbu	Nigeria	DNS	
	6	Bashir Ahmed Hudib	Oman	DNS	

=== Semifinals ===
First 4 of each semifinal (Q) qualified directly for the final.

Rank	Heat	Name	Nationality	Time	Notes
1	1	Bruny Surin	Canada	6.50	Q, =CR
2	2	Frankie Fredericks	Namibia	6.55	Q
3	2	Talal Mansour	Qatar	6.55	Q
4	1	Joel Isasi	Cuba	6.59	Q
5	1	Jason John	Great Britain	6.60	Q
6	1	Dennis Mitchell	United States	6.61	Q
7	2	Jon Drummond	United States	6.62	Q
8	2	Andrés Simón	Cuba	6.65	Q
9	1	Aleksandr Porkhomovskiy	Russia	6.68	
10	2	Derrick Sutherland	Canada	6.71	
11	1	Daniel Cojocaru	Romania	6.72	
11	2	Kennet Kjensli	Norway	6.72	
11	2	Alexandros Terzian	Greece	6.72	
14	2	Johann Venter	South Africa	6.77	
15	1	Sanusi Turay	Sierra Leone	6.78	
16	1	Emmanuel Tuffour	Ghana	6.79	

=== Final ===
Rank	Lane	Name	Nationality	Time	Notes
1st place, gold medalist(s)	5	Bruny Surin	Canada	6.50	=CR
2nd place, silver medalist(s)	4	Frankie Fredericks	Namibia	6.51	AR
3rd place, bronze medalist(s)	3	Talal Mansour	Qatar	6.57	
4	7	Jon Drummond	United States	6.58	
5	6	Joel Isasi	Cuba	6.61	
6	8	Dennis Mitchell	United States	6.62	
7	2	Andrés Simón	Cuba	6.63	
	1	Jason John	Great Britain	DNF	
