= 1994 European Athletics Indoor Championships – Men's 60 metres =

The men's 60 metres event at the 1994 European Athletics Indoor Championships was held in Palais Omnisports de Paris-Bercy on 11 March.

== Medalists ==
Gold	Silver	Bronze
Colin Jackson; Great Britain	Alexandros Terzian; Greece	Michael Rosswess; Great Britain

== Results ==
=== Heats ===
First 2 from each heat (Q) and the next 4 fastest (q) qualified for the semifinals.

Rank	Heat	Name	Nationality	Time	Notes
1	2	Colin Jackson	Great Britain	6.57	Q
2	2	Alexandros Terzian	Greece	6.62	Q
3	4	Aleksandr Porkhomovskiy	Russia	6.63	Q
4	1	Michael Rosswess	Great Britain	6.67	Q
5	3	Pavel Galkin	Russia	6.69	Q
5	4	Daniel Sangouma	France	6.69	Q
7	3	Kastytis Klimas	Lithuania	6.70	Q
7	3	Kennet Kjensli	Norway	6.70	q
7	4	Marc Blume	Germany	6.70	q
10	2	Daniel Cojocaru	Romania	6.71	q
10	3	Laurent Nevo	France	6.71	q
12	4	David Dollé	Switzerland	6.72	
13	1	Oleg Kramarenko	Ukraine	6.74	Q
12	3	Alessandro Orlandi	Italy	6.75	
13	1	Alexandros Yenovelis	Greece	6.76	
14	1	Patrik Lövgren	Sweden	6.78	
15	2	Luis Turón	Spain	6.79	
16	1	Pál Rezák	Hungary	6.81	
17	3	Aleksandr Shlychkov	Ukraine	6.82	
18	4	Thomas Leandersson	Sweden	6.84	
	4	Einar Thor Einarsson	Iceland	DNF	

=== Semifinals ===
First 3 from each semifinal qualified directly (Q) for the final.

Rank	Heat	Name	Nationality	Time	Notes
1	1	Colin Jackson	Great Britain	6.55	Q
2	1	Alexandros Terzian	Greece	6.58	Q, NR
3	2	Michael Rosswess	Great Britain	6.59	Q
4	2	Aleksandr Porkhomovskiy	Russia	6.61	Q
5	2	Daniel Sangouma	France	6.65	Q
6	1	Laurent Nevo	France	6.69	Q
7	1	Pavel Galkin	Russia	6.70	
8	2	Daniel Cojocaru	Romania	6.73	
9	2	Kastytis Klimas	Lithuania	6.74	
10	2	Marc Blume	Germany	6.74	
11	1	Kennet Kjensli	Norway	6.75	
12	1	Oleg Kramarenko	Ukraine	6.76	

=== Final ===
Rank	Lane	Name	Nationality	Time	Notes
1st place, gold medalist(s)	3	Colin Jackson	Great Britain	6.49	CR, NR
2nd place, silver medalist(s)	4	Alexandros Terzian	Greece	6.51	NR
3rd place, bronze medalist(s)	5	Michael Rosswess	Great Britain	6.54	
4	1	Aleksandr Porkhomovskiy	Russia	6.59	
5	6	Daniel Sangouma	France	6.65	
6	2	Laurent Nevo	France	6.75	
