= Athletics at the 2000 Summer Olympics – Men's 100 metres =

Men's 100 metres at the Games of the XXVII Olympiad
- Olympic Athletics
- Venue: Stadium Australia
- Date: 22–23 September
- Competitors: 97 from 71 nations
- Winning time: 9.87

Medalists
1st place, gold medalist(s)		Maurice Greene; United States
2nd place, silver medalist(s)		Ato Boldon; Trinidad and Tobago
3rd place, bronze medalist(s)		Obadele Thompson; Barbados

The men's 100 metres at the 2000 Summer Olympics as part of the athletics program were held at the Stadium Australia from 22 to 23 September. Ninety-seven athletes from 71 nations competed. Each nation was limited to 3 athletes per rules in force since the 1930 Olympic Congress. The event was won by American Maurice Greene, the United States's first title in the event since 1988 and 15th overall. Ato Boldon of Trinidad and Tobago improved on his 1996 bronze with a silver in Sydney. Obadele Thompson won the first-ever medal in the men's 100 metres for Barbados with bronze.

== Background ==
This was the twenty-fourth time the event was held, having appeared at every Olympics since the first in 1896. Two finalists from 1996 returned: defending gold medalist Donovan Bailey of Canada and bronze medalist Ato Boldon of Trinidad and Tobago. Two-time silver medalist Frankie Fredericks of Namibia was injured and unable to compete. The United States team was led by reigning world champion (1997 and 1999) and world record holder Maurice Greene. Boldon, the 1998 Commonwealth champion, was the main challenger to Greene.

Albania, American Samoa, Brunei, Croatia, Georgia, Guam, Palau, and Saint Lucia appeared in the event for the first time. The United States made its 23rd appearance in the event, most of any country, having missed only the boycotted 1980 Games.

== Qualification ==
The qualification period for athletics took place between 1 January 1999 to 11 September 2000. For the men's 100 metres, each National Olympic Committee was permitted to enter up to three athletes that had run the race in 10.27 seconds or faster during the qualification period. If an NOC had no athletes that qualified under that standard, one athlete that had run the race in 10.40 seconds or faster could be entered.

== Competition format ==
The event retained the same basic four round format introduced in 1920: heats, quarterfinals, semifinals, and a final. The "fastest loser" system, introduced in 1968, was used again to ensure that the quarterfinals and subsequent rounds had exactly 8 runners per heat; this time, the system was used in both the heats and quarterfinals.

The first round consisted of 11 heats, each with 9 athletes scheduled (1 heats had 7 actually run due to withdrawals). The top three runners in each heat advanced, along with the next seven fastest runners overall; due to a tie for the final "fastest loser" place, both men advanced. This made 41 quarterfinalists, who were divided into 5 heats of 8 runners, with an extra runner in one heat due to the tie. The top three runners in each quarterfinal advanced, with one "fastest loser" place. The 16 semifinalists competed in two heats of 8, with the top four in each semifinal advancing to the eight-man final.

== Records ==
Prior to the competition, the existing World and Olympic records were as follows.

World record	Maurice Greene (USA)	9.79 s	Athens, Greece	16 June 1999
Olympic record	Donovan Bailey (CAN)	9.84 s	Atlanta, United States	27 July 1996

No new records were set during the competition.

== Schedule ==
All times are Australian Eastern Daylight Time (UTC+11:00)

Date	Time	Round
Friday, 22 September 2000	11:35; 20:45	Round 1 Round 2
Saturday, 23 September 2000	18:50; 20:05	Semifinals; Final

== Results ==
=== Round 1 ===
Qualification rule: The first three finishers in each heat (Q) plus the seven (eight, after a tie for the seventh place occurred) fastest times of those who finished fourth or lower in their heat (q) qualified.

==== Heat 1 ====
Rank	Lane	Athlete	Nation	Reaction	Time	Notes
1	9	Aziz Zakari	Ghana	0.317	10.31	Q
2	3	Patrick Johnson	Australia	0.152	10.31	Q
3	8	Venancio José	Spain	0.169	10.36	Q
4	5	Martin Lachkovics	Austria	0.150	10.41	q
5	6	Nicolas Macrozonaris	Canada	0.189	10.45	
6	2	Jamal Al-Saffar	Saudi Arabia	0.165	10.54	
7	7	Lương Tích Thiện	Vietnam	0.245	10.85	
8	1	Pa Modou Gai	The Gambia	0.173	11.03	
9	4	Mario Bonello	Malta	0.157	11.06	
				Wind: −0.6 m/s		

==== Heat 2 ====
Rank	Lane	Athlete	Nation	Reaction	Time	Notes
1	9	Marcin Nowak	Poland	0.164	10.27	Q
2	3	Sunday Emmanuel	Nigeria	0.152	10.31	Q
3	5	Freddy Mayola	Cuba	0.155	10.33	Q
4	6	Sayon Cooper	Liberia	0.168	10.33	q
5	4	David Patros	France	0.258	10.38	q
6	2	Chiang Wai Hung	Hong Kong	0.200	10.64	
7	1	Teymur Gasimov	Azerbaijan	0.227	10.97	
8	7	Haseri Asli	Brunei	0.259	11.11	
9	8	Sisomphone Vongphakdy	Laos	0.221	11.47	
				Wind: −0.6 m/s		

==== Heat 3 ====
Rank	Lane	Athlete	Nation	Reaction	Time	Notes
1	1	Curtis Johnson	United States	0.194	10.30	Q
2	9	Vicente de Lima	Brazil	0.159	10.31	Q
3	2	Georgios Theodoridis	Greece	0.169	10.34	Q
4	6	Bruny Surin	Canada	0.198	10.41	q
5	8	Renward Wells	Bahamas	0.252	10.47	
6	5	Dejan Vojnović	Croatia	0.139	10.50	SB
7	4	Tommi Hartonen	Finland	0.235	10.53	
8	3	Seun Ogunkoya	Nigeria	0.193	10.72	
	7	Fernando Arlete	Guinea-Bissau	0.197	DNF	
				Wind: +0.4 m/s		

==== Heat 4 ====
Rank	Lane	Athlete	Nation	Reaction	Time	Notes
1	2	Obadele Thompson	Barbados	0.239	10.23	Q
2	5	Deji Aliu	Nigeria	0.214	10.35	Q
3	7	Shingo Kawabata	Japan	0.169	10.39	Q
4	6	Stefano Tilli	Italy	0.209	10.40	q
5	8	Raphael Oliveira	Brazil	0.179	10.44	
6	4	Paul Brizzell	Ireland	0.205	10.62	
7	3	Petko Yankov	Bulgaria	0.227	10.63	
8	9	Christopher Adolf	Palau	0.147	11.01	NR
9	1	Toluta'u Koula	Tonga	0.215	11.01	
				Wind: −0.5 m/s		

==== Heat 5 ====
Rank	Lane	Athlete	Nation	Reaction	Time	Notes
1	1	Darren Campbell	Great Britain	0.224	10.28	Q
2	7	Serge Bengono	Cameroon	0.200	10.35	Q
3	5	Piotr Balcerzak	Poland	0.146	10.42	Q
4	9	Tommy Kafri	Israel	0.207	10.43	
5	2	Christian Nsiah	Ghana	0.154	10.44	
6	3	Francesco Scuderi	Italy	0.152	10.50	
7	4	Idrissa Sanou	Burkina Faso	0.234	10.60	
8	8	Youssouf Simpara	Mali	0.218	10.82	
	6	Ronald Promesse	Saint Lucia	0.272	DNF	
				Wind: −0.5 m/s		

==== Heat 6 ====
Rank	Lane	Athlete	Nation	Reaction	Time	Notes
1	3	Maurice Greene	United States	0.195	10.31	Q
2	5	Kim Collins	Saint Kitts and Nevis	0.240	10.39	Q
3	8	Joseph Batangdon	Cameroon	0.192	10.45	Q
4	9	Andrea Colombo	Italy	0.264	10.52	
5	7	Watson Nyambek	Malaysia	0.175	10.61	
6	4	John Muray	Indonesia	0.180	10.68	
7	2	Teina Teiti	Cook Islands	0.170	11.22	
	1	Cherico Detenamo	Nauru		DNS	
	6	Angelos Pavlakakis	Greece		DNS	
				Wind: +0.2 m/s		

==== Heat 7 ====
Rank	Lane	Athlete	Nation	Reaction	Time	Notes
1	2	Stéphane Buckland	Mauritius	0.218	10.35	Q
2	1	Dwain Chambers	Great Britain	0.171	10.38	Q
3	6	Donovan Bailey	Canada	0.235	10.39	Q
4	7	Marc Blume	Germany	0.264	10.42	
5	9	Paul di Bella	Australia	0.231	10.52	
6	4	Edgardo Antonio Serpas	El Salvador	0.168	10.63	
7	3	Hadhari Saindou Djaffar	Comoros	0.250	10.68	
8	5	Kelsey Nakanelua	American Samoa	0.245	10.93	NR
9	8	Jean Randriamamitiana	Madagascar	0.210	12.50	
				Wind: +0.3 m/s		

==== Heat 8 ====
Rank	Lane	Athlete	Nation	Reaction	Time	Notes
1	9	Ato Boldon	Trinidad and Tobago	0.170	10.04	Q
2	1	Antoine Boussombo	Gabon	0.177	10.13	Q, =NR
3	2	Leo Myles-Mills	Ghana	0.193	10.15	Q, SB
4	3	Ibrahim Meité	Ivory Coast	0.191	10.24	q, PB
5	6	Claudio Sousa	Brazil	0.222	10.31	q
6	8	Anninos Marcoullides	Cyprus	0.278	10.32	q, SB
7	5	Yanes Raubaba	Indonesia	0.247	10.54	
8	4	Oltion Luli	Albania	0.235	11.08	
9	7	Mamane Sani Ali	Niger	0.219	11.25	SB
				Wind: +1.9 m/s		

==== Heat 9 ====
Rank	Lane	Athlete	Nation	Reaction	Time	Notes
1	5	Jonathan Drummond	United States	0.198	10.20	Q
2	9	Matt Shirvington	Australia	0.241	10.35	Q
3	7	Patrick Jarrett	Jamaica	0.146	10.41	Q
4	2	Anatoliy Dovhal	Ukraine	0.174	10.48	
5	8	Oscar Meneses	Guatemala	0.212	10.54	
6	1	Shigeyuki Kojima	Japan	0.217	10.59	
7	6	Caimin Douglas	Netherlands Antilles	0.259	10.69	
8	3	Abraham Kepsin	Vanuatu	0.172	11.12	PB
9	4	Philam Garcia	Guam	0.220	11.21	
				Wind: +0.3 m/s		

==== Heat 10 ====
Rank	Lane	Athlete	Nation	Reaction	Time	Notes
1	1	Jason Gardener	Great Britain	0.188	10.38	Q
2	3	Lindel Frater	Jamaica	0.154	10.45	Q
3	5	Kostyantyn Rurak	Ukraine	0.224	10.48	Q
4	4	Sherwin Vries	Namibia	0.165	10.53	
5	2	Niconnor Alexander	Trinidad and Tobago	0.149	10.56	
6	9	Sergey Bychkov	Russia	0.183	10.68	
7	8	Ruslan Rusidze	Georgia	0.166	10.70	
8	7	Alpha Kamara	Sierra Leone	0.162	10.74	
9	6	Vitaliy Medvedev	Kazakhstan	0.209	10.75	
				Wind: −0.7 m/s		

==== Heat 11 ====
Rank	Lane	Athlete	Nation	Reaction	Time	Notes
1	3	Christopher Williams	Jamaica	0.186	10.35	Q
2	5	Mathew Quinn	South Africa	0.170	10.44	Q
3	7	Koji Ito	Japan	0.234	10.45	Q
4	6	Héber Viera	Uruguay	0.246	10.54	
5	4	Gabriel Simon	Argentina	0.166	10.56	
6	8	Erwin Heru Susanto	Indonesia	0.164	10.87	
7	1	Moumi Sebergue	Chad	0.249	11.00	
8	9	Guillermo Dongo	Suriname	0.197	11.10	
9	2	Nelson Lucas	Seychelles	0.218	11.15	
				Wind: −1.2 m/s		

=== Quarterfinals ===
Qualification rule: The first three finishers in each heat (Q) plus the next fastest overall sprinter (q) qualified.

==== Quarterfinal 1 ====
Rank	Lane	Athlete	Nation	Reaction	Time	Notes
1	4	Maurice Greene	United States	0.182	10.10	Q
2	2	Leo Myles-Mills	Ghana	0.145	10.23	Q
3	5	Sunday Emmanuel	Nigeria	0.165	10.36	Q
4	6	Marcin Nowak	Poland	0.186	10.37	
5	8	Sayon Cooper	Liberia	0.147	10.37	
6	1	Ibrahim Meité	Ivory Coast	0.191	10.40	
7	3	Serge Bengono	Cameroon	0.222	10.46	
8	7	Shingo Kawabata	Japan	0.184	10.60	
				Wind: −1.7 m/s		

==== Quarterfinal 2 ====
Rank	Lane	Athlete	Nation	Reaction	Time	Notes
1	3	Ato Boldon	Trinidad and Tobago	0.155	10.11	Q
2	4	Kim Collins	Saint Kitts and Nevis	0.222	10.19	Q
3	2	Bruny Surin	Canada	0.130	10.20	Q
4	5	Jason Gardener	Great Britain	0.177	10.27	
5	6	Christopher Williams	Jamaica	0.187	10.30	
6	8	Freddy Mayola	Cuba	0.144	10.35	
7	1	Piotr Balcerzak	Poland	0.152	10.38	
8	9	Martin Lachkovics	Austria	0.189	10.44	
9	7	Joseph Batangdon	Cameroon	0.231	10.52	
				Wind: +0.3 m/s		

==== Quarterfinal 3 ====
Rank	Lane	Athlete	Nation	Reaction	Time	Notes
1	3	Obadele Thompson	Barbados	0.187	10.04	Q
2	5	Matt Shirvington	Australia	0.142	10.13	Q
3	6	Aziz Zakari	Ghana	0.193	10.22	Q
4	2	Lindel Frater	Jamaica	0.185	10.23	q
5	4	Vicente de Lima	Brazil	0.191	10.28	
6	7	David Patros	France	0.241	10.33	
7	8	Kostyantyn Rurak	Ukraine	0.191	10.38	
8	1	Donovan Bailey	Canada	0.216	11.36	
				Wind: +0.8 m/s		

==== Quarterfinal 4 ====
Rank	Lane	Athlete	Nation	Reaction	Time	Notes
1	4	Dwain Chambers	Great Britain	0.150	10.12	Q
2	5	Jonathan Drummond	United States	0.145	10.15	Q
3	1	Koji Ito	Japan	0.221	10.25	Q, SB
4	6	Stéphane Buckland	Mauritius	0.150	10.26	
5	3	Antoine Boussombo	Gabon	0.190	10.27	
6	7	Stefano Tilli	Italy	0.162	10.27	
7	2	Mathew Quinn	South Africa	0.157	10.27	
8	8	Patrick Jarrett	Jamaica	0.184	16.40	
				Wind: +0.8 m/s		

==== Quarterfinal 5 ====
Rank	Lane	Athlete	Nation	Reaction	Time	Notes
1	5	Darren Campbell	Great Britain	0.229	10.21	Q
2	3	Curtis Johnson	United States	0.142	10.24	Q
3	4	Deji Aliu	Nigeria	0.181	10.29	Q
4	7	Georgios Theodoridis	Greece	0.144	10.29	
5	6	Patrick Johnson	Australia	0.236	10.44	
6	1	Claudio Sousa	Brazil	0.182	10.47	
7	8	Anninos Marcoullides	Cyprus	0.183	10.48	
8	2	Venancio José	Spain	0.189	10.53	
				Wind: +0.2 m/s		

=== Semifinals ===
Qualification rule: The first four runners in each semifinal heat (Q) moves on to the final.

==== Semifinal 1 ====
Rank	Lane	Athlete	Nation	Reaction	Time	Notes
1	5	Dwain Chambers	Great Britain	0.164	10.14	Q
2	4	Obadele Thompson	Barbados	0.189	10.15	Q
3	3	Darren Campbell	Great Britain	0.161	10.19	Q
4	6	Kim Collins	Saint Kitts and Nevis	0.184	10.20	Q
5	7	Leo Myles-Mills	Ghana	0.220	10.25	
6	1	Curtis Johnson	United States	0.146	10.27	
7	2	Koji Ito	Japan	0.217	10.39	
8	8	Lindel Frater	Jamaica	0.203	10.46	
				Wind: +0.4 m/s		

==== Semifinal 2 ====
Rank	Lane	Athlete	Nation	Reaction	Time	Notes
1	5	Maurice Greene	United States	0.227	10.06	Q
2	3	Jonathan Drummond	United States	0.137	10.10	Q
3	4	Ato Boldon	Trinidad and Tobago	0.212	10.13	Q
4	1	Aziz Zakari	Ghana	0.236	10.16	Q
5	6	Matt Shirvington	Australia	0.166	10.26	
6	8	Deji Aliu	Nigeria	0.253	10.32	
7	7	Sunday Emmanuel	Nigeria	0.163	10.45	
	2	Bruny Surin	Canada	0.151	DNF	
				Wind: +0.2 m/s		

=== Final ===
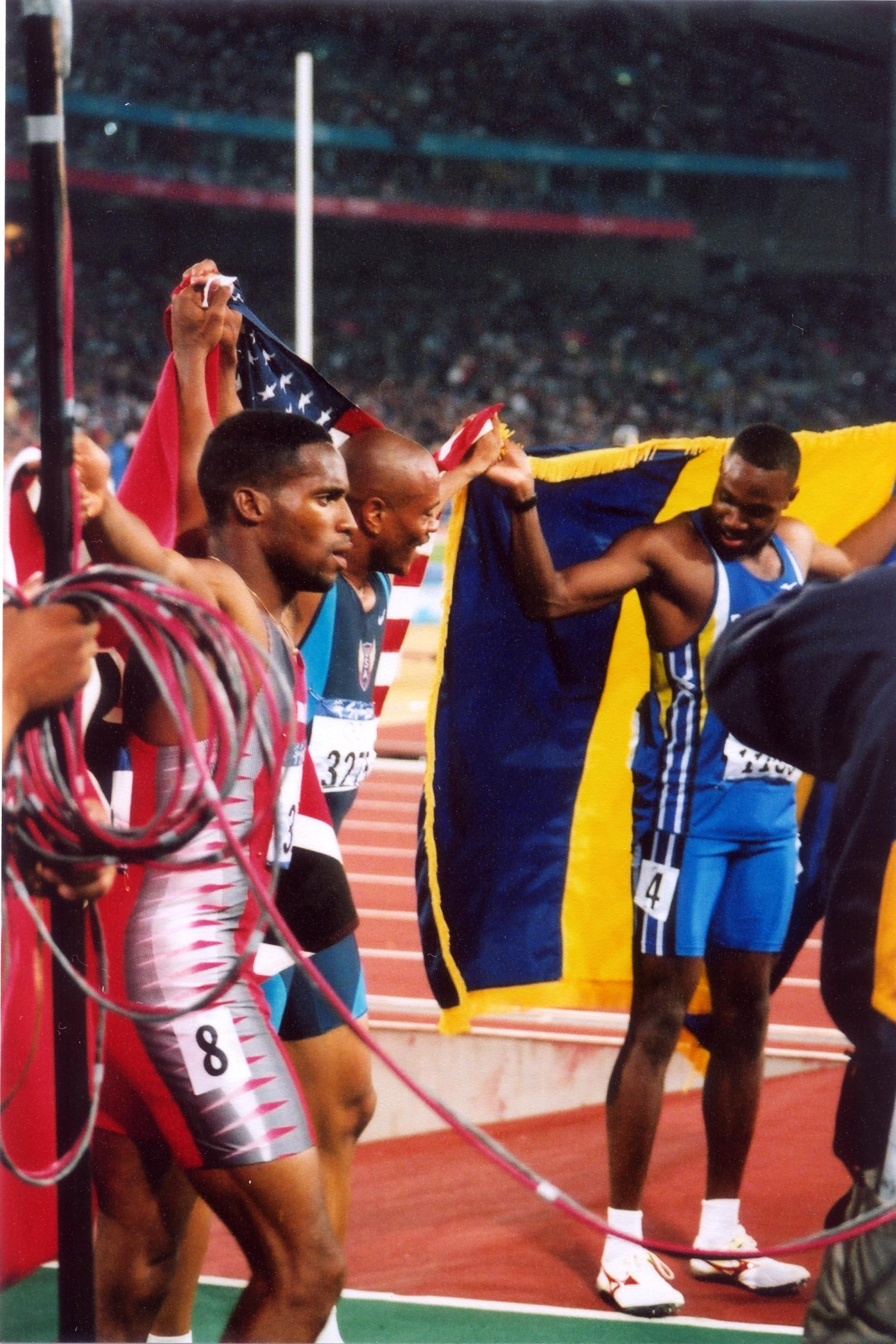
The three medallists celebrating

Zakari was injured at about the 35 metre mark and did not finish.

Rank	Lane	Athlete	Nation	Reaction	Time	Notes
1st place, gold medalist(s)	5	Maurice Greene	United States	0.197	9.87	
2nd place, silver medalist(s)	8	Ato Boldon	Trinidad and Tobago	0.136	9.99	
3rd place, bronze medalist(s)	4	Obadele Thompson	Barbados	0.216	10.04	
4	3	Dwain Chambers	Great Britain	0.174	10.08	SB
5	6	Jon Drummond	United States	0.147	10.09	
6	1	Darren Campbell	Great Britain	0.193	10.13	
7	7	Kim Collins	Saint Kitts and Nevis	0.210	10.17	
	2	Aziz Zakari	Ghana	0.180	DNF	
				Wind: −0.3 m/s		
