= 1995 World Championships in Athletics – Men's 100 metres =

Men's 100 metres at the 1995 World Championships
- Venue: Ullevi Stadium
- Dates: 5 August (heats and quarter-finals); 6 August (semi-finals and final)
- Competitors: 91
- Winning time: 9.97

Medalists
gold medal	Donovan Bailey	Canada
silver medal	Bruny Surin	Canada
bronze medal	Ato Boldon	Trinidad and Tobago

These are the official results of the Men's 100 metres event at the 1995 IAAF World Championships in Gothenburg, Sweden. There were a total number of 91 participating athletes, with two semi-finals, five quarter-finals and twelve qualifying heats and the final held on Sunday 6 August 1995.

At 15 years, 153 days old, Montserratian Darren Tuitt became the youngest male competitor at the World Championships in Athletics.

== Final ==
RANK	FINAL Wind: +1.0	TIME
	Donovan Bailey (CAN)	9.97
	Bruny Surin (CAN)	10.03
	Ato Boldon (TRI)	10.03
4.	Frankie Fredericks (NAM)	10.07
5.	Michael Marsh (USA)	10.10
6.	Linford Christie (GBR)	10.12
7.	Olapade Adeniken (NGR)	10.20
8.	Ray Stewart (JAM)	10.29

== Semi-finals ==
- Held on Sunday 1995-08-06

RANK	HEAT 1 Wind: -0.2	TIME
1.	Bruny Surin (CAN)	10.03
2.	Ato Boldon (TRI)	10.10
3.	Frankie Fredericks (NAM)	10.10
4.	Linford Christie (GBR)	10.12
5.	Robson da Silva (BRA)	10.20
6.	Renward Wells (BAH)	10.27
7.	Michael Green (JAM)	10.30
8.	Augustine Nketia (NZL)	10.45

RANK	HEAT 2 Wind: +1.8	TIME
1.	Donovan Bailey (CAN)	10.04
2.	Michael Marsh (USA)	10.08
3.	Olapade Adeniken (NGR)	10.16
4.	Ray Stewart (JAM)	10.17
5.	Damien Marsh (AUS)	10.20
6.	Joel Isasi (CUB)	10.22
7.	Darren Braithwaite (GBR)	10.28
8.	Andrey Grigoryev (RUS)	10.30

== Quarterfinals ==
- Held on Saturday 1995-08-05

RANK	HEAT 1 Wind: -0.3	TIME
1.	Donovan Bailey (CAN)	10.18
2.	Damien Marsh (AUS)	10.25
3.	Robson da Silva (BRA)	10.29
4.	Alexandros Alexopoulos (GRE)	10.29
5.	Chen Wenzhong (CHN)	10.32
6.	Anninos Markoullides (CYP)	10.41
7.	Ibrahim Meité (CIV)	10.50
8.	Sanusi Turay (SLE)	10.55

RANK	HEAT 2 Wind: +0.0	TIME
1.	Linford Christie (GBR)	10.15
2.	Ray Stewart (JAM)	10.24
3.	Andrey Grigoryev (RUS)	10.27
4.	Paul Henderson (AUS)	10.34
5.	Deji Aliu (NGR)	10.36
6.	Lars Hedner (SWE)	10.41
7.	Patrick Stevens (BEL)	10.42
8.	Vitaliy Savin (KAZ)	10.47

RANK	HEAT 3 Wind: -0.8	TIME
1.	Olapade Adeniken (NGR)	10.23
2.	Michael Green (JAM)	10.26
3.	Augustine Nketia (NZL)	10.28
4.	Emmanuel Tuffour (GHA)	10.29
5.	Jason John (GBR)	10.39
6.	Aleksandr Porkhomovskiy (RUS)	10.52
7.	Ousmane Diarra (MLI)	10.54
8.	Stefan Burkart (SUI)	10.69

RANK	HEAT 4 Wind: +2.1	TIME
1.	Michael Marsh (USA)	10.03w
2.	Frankie Fredericks (NAM)	10.09w
3.	Joel Isasi (CUB)	10.22w
4.	Edson Ribeiro (BRA)	10.29w
5.	Peter Karlsson (SWE)	10.39w
6.	Oleh Kramarenko (UKR)	10.40w
7.	Marc Blume (GER)	10.40w
8.	Glenroy Gilbert (CAN)	10.41w

RANK	HEAT 5 Wind: -0.5	TIME
1.	Ato Boldon (TRI)	10.04
2.	Bruny Surin (CAN)	10.14
3.	Renward Wells (BAH)	10.18
4.	Darren Braithwaite (GBR)	10.23
5.	Obadele Thompson (BAR)	10.30
6.	Maurice Greene (USA)	10.35
7.	Yoshitaka Ito (JPN)	10.48
8.	Shane Naylor (AUS)	10.49

== Qualifying heats ==
- Held on Saturday 1995-08-05

RANK	HEAT 1 Wind: +0.6	TIME
1.	Deji Aliu (NGR)	10.20
2.	Darren Braithwaite (GBR)	10.25
3.	Edson Ribeiro (BRA)	10.37
4.	Yiannis Zisimides (CYP)	10.53
5.	Vitaly Medvedev (KAZ)	10.54
6.	Nigel Jones (GRN)	10.88
7.	Alberto Mendes (DOM)	10.92
8.	Toluta'u Koula (TGA)	10.98

RANK	HEAT 2 Wind: -0.3	TIME
1.	Frankie Fredericks (NAM)	10.18
2.	Andrey Grigoryev (RUS)	10.24
3.	Obadele Thompson (BAR)	10.27
4.	Ousmane Diarra (MLI)	10.38
5.	Benjamin Sirimou (CMR)	10.51
6.	Franck Amegnigan (TOG)	10.81
7.	Abdulaziz Mattar (BHR)	10.93
8.	Ahmed Shageef (MDV)	11.46

RANK	HEAT 3 Wind: +0.7	TIME
1.	Donovan Bailey (CAN)	10.13
2.	Maurice Greene (USA)	10.26
3.	Paul Henderson (AUS)	10.35
4.	Oleh Kramarenko (UKR)	10.46
5.	Daniel Cojocaru (ROM)	10.67
6.	Azmi Ibrahim (MAS)	10.76
7.	Tesfaye Jenbere (ETH)	11.20

RANK	HEAT 4 Wind: +0.0	TIME
1.	Michael Green (JAM)	10.20
2.	Augustine Nketia (NZL)	10.24
3.	Jason John (GBR)	10.25
4.	Lars Hedner (SWE)	10.43
5.	Sanusi Turay (SLE)	10.43
6.	Alexandros Terzian (GRE)	10.47
7.	Matarr N'Jie (GAM)	11.05
8.	Odair Da Costa (STP)	11.19

RANK	HEAT 5 Wind: -0.2	TIME
1.	Ato Boldon (TRI)	10.24
2.	Peter Karlsson (SWE)	10.35
3.	Glenroy Gilbert (CAN)	10.36
4.	Jaime Barragan (MEX)	10.53
5.	Jorge Aguilera (CUB)	10.58
6.	Frutos Feo (ESP)	10.59
7.	Ricky Canon (NRU)	11.51
8.	Tururangi Tarapu (COK)	11.85

RANK	HEAT 6 Wind: -0.7	TIME
1.	Bruny Surin (CAN)	10.24
2.	Ray Stewart (JAM)	10.27
3.	Ibrahim Meité (CIV)	10.40
4.	Satoru Inoue (JPN)	10.56
5.	Aleksey Chikhachov (UKR)	10.56
6.	Peter Pulu (PNG)	10.68
7.	Lin Wei (CHN)	10.68
8.	Ahmed Al-Moamari (OMA)	10.94

RANK	HEAT 7 Wind: -1.3	TIME
1.	Emmanuel Tuffour (GHA)	10.24
2.	Alexandros Alexopoulos (GRE)	10.35
3.	Vitaliy Savin (KAZ)	10.49
4.	Claus Hirsbro (DEN)	10.52
5.	Dmitriy Vanyaikin (UKR)	10.62
6.	Garfield Gill (BAR)	10.90
7.	Albert Juan (GUM)	11.56
8.	Darren Tuitt (MSR)	11.67

RANK	HEAT 8 Wind: -0.1	TIME
1.	Linford Christie (GBR)	10.26
2.	Marc Blume (GER)	10.39
3.	Aleksandr Porkhomovskiy (RUS)	10.44
4.	Matias Ghansah (SWE)	10.49
5.	Reşat Oğuz (TUR)	10.65
6.	Fabian Muyaba (ZIM)	10.67
7.	Patrick Mocci Raoumbe (GAB)	10.73

RANK	HEAT 9 Wind: -0.8	TIME
1.	Damien Marsh (AUS)	10.28
2.	Olapade Adeniken (NGR)	10.30
3.	Renward Wells (BAH)	10.33
4.	Leonardo Prevost (CUB)	10.60
5.	Patrick Delice (TRI)	10.69
6.	Kfir Golan (ISR)	10.71
7.	Bimal Tarafdar (BAN)	10.90

RANK	HEAT 10 Wind: +0.8	TIME
1.	Chen Wenzhong (CHN)	10.37
2.	Robson da Silva (BRA)	10.37
3.	Shane Naylor (AUS)	10.45
4.	Fernando Ramirez (NOR)	10.53
5.	Hsin-Ping Huang (TPE)	10.66
6.	Vladislav Chernobay (KGZ)	11.00
—	Davidson Ezinwa (NGR)	DNS

RANK	HEAT 11 Wind: -2.2	TIME
1.	Joel Isasi (CUB)	10.44
2.	Stefan Burkart (SUI)	10.61
3.	Yoshitaka Ito (JPN)	10.62
4.	Sidnei de Souza (BRA)	10.63
5.	Kurvin Wallace (SKN)	10.82
6.	Francisco Obama Afang (GEQ)	11.82
—	Dennis Mitchell (USA)	DNF

RANK	HEAT 12 Wind: -1.7	TIME
1.	Michael Marsh (USA)	10.27
2.	Patrick Stevens (BEL)	10.42
3.	Anninos Markoullides (CYP)	10.43
4.	Chintake De Zoysa (SRI)	10.60
5.	Miguel Janssen (ARU)	10.73
6.	Alvin Daniel (TRI)	10.81
7.	Giang Cu Thanh (VIE)	11.18
—	Hassan Illiassou (NIG)	DNS
