= 1994 European Athletics Championships – Men's 100 metres =

Men's 100 metres at the 1994 European Athletics Championships
- Venue: Helsinki Olympic Stadium
- Location: Helsinki
- Dates: 7 August (heats); 8 August (semifinals & finall)
- Competitors: 41 from 22 nations
- Winning time: 10.14

Medalists
gold medal	Linford Christie	Great Britain
silver medal	Geir Moen	Norway
bronze medal	Alex Porkhomovskiy	Russia

The men's 100 metres event at the 1994 European Athletics Championships was held in Helsinki, Finland, at Helsinki Olympic Stadium on 7 and 8 August 1994.

== Participation ==
According to an unofficial count, 41 athletes from 22 countries participated in the event.

- Belarus (1)
- Belgium (1)
- Croatia (1)
- Cyprus (2)
- Finland (3)
- France (2)
- Germany (1)
- Greece (3)
- Israel (1)
- Italy (3)
- Latvia (1)
- Malta (1)
- Netherlands (1)
- Norway (2)
- Poland (1)
- Romania (1)
- Russia (3)
- Spain (2)
- Sweden (3)
- Switzerland (3)
- Ukraine (2)
- United Kingdom (3)

== Results ==
=== Heats ===
7 August

==== Heat 1 ====
Wind: -0.9 m/s

Rank	Name	Nationality	Time	Notes
1	Hermann Lomba	France	10.42	Q
2	Aléxandros Terzián	Greece	10.46	Q
3	Yiannios Zisimides	Cyprus	10.48	Q
4	Toby Box	United Kingdom	10.54	Q
5	Dmitriy Vanyaikin	Ukraine	10.57	q
6	Ari Pakarinen	Finland	10.62	
7	Mario Bonello	Malta	11.16	
			Wind: -0.9 m/s	

==== Heat 2 ====
Rank	Name	Nationality	Time	Notes
1	Geir Moen	Norway	10.29	Q
2	Marc Blume	Germany	10.36	Q
3	Andrey Grigoryev	Russia	10.37	Q
4	Aléxandros Yenovélis	Greece	10.49	Q
5	Pedro Pablo Nolet	Spain	10.50	q
6	Jukka Vähäkangas	Finland	10.54	q
7	Thomas Leandersson	Sweden	10.59	q
			Wind: +0.8 m/s	

==== Heat 3 ====
Rank	Name	Nationality	Time	Notes
1	Linford Christie	United Kingdom	10.39	Q
2	Patrick Stevens	Belgium	10.41	Q
3	Kennet Kjensli	Norway	10.44	Q
4	Lasse Juusela	Finland	10.54	Q
5	Sergey Kornelyuk	Belarus	10.56	q
6	Pascal Thurnherr	Switzerland	10.60	q
7	Siniša Ergotić	Croatia	10.80	
			Wind: +0.3 m/s	

==== Heat 4 ====
Rank	Name	Nationality	Time	Notes
1	Alex Porkhomovskiy	Russia	10.34	Q
2	Oleg Kramarenko	Ukraine	10.35	Q
3	Peter Karlsson	Sweden	10.44	Q
4	Regilio van der Vloot	Netherlands	10.52	Q
5	Ezio Madonia	Italy	10.62	q
6	Marek Zalewski	Poland	10.69	
7	Frutos Feo	Spain	10.74	
			Wind: -0.8 m/s	

==== Heat 5 ====
Rank	Name	Nationality	Time	Notes
1	Anninos Marcoullides	Cyprus	10.40	Q
2	Jason John	United Kingdom	10.41	Q
3	Daniel Cojocaru	Romania	10.46	Q
4	Éric Perrot	France	10.53	Q
5	Stefan Burkart	Switzerland	10.53	q
6	Domenico Nettis	Italy	10.63	
7	Guntis Zālītis	Latvia	10.75	
			Wind: -0.4 m/s	

==== Heat 6 ====
Rank	Name	Nationality	Time	Notes
1	David Dollé	Switzerland	10.52	Q
2	Sandro Floris	Italy	10.52	Q
3	Aléxios Alexópoulos	Greece	10.55	Q
4	Matias Ghansah	Sweden	10.61	Q
5	Viktor Malchugin	Russia	10.70	
6	Kfir Golan	Israel	10.72	
	Aham Okeke	Norway	DNS	
			Wind: +0.1 m/s	

=== Second round ===
7 August

==== Heat 1 ====
Rank	Name	Nationality	Time	Notes
1	Linford Christie	United Kingdom	10.08	Q
2	Aléxandros Terzián	Greece	10.31	Q
3	David Dollé	Switzerland	10.35	Q
4	Kennet Kjensli	Norway	10.37	Q
5	Éric Perrot	France	10.55	
6	Regilio van der Vloot	Netherlands	10.56	
7	Sergey Kornelyuk	Belarus	10.57	
8	Thomas Leandersson	Sweden	10.70	
			Wind: +0.7 m/s	

==== Heat 2 ====
Rank	Name	Nationality	Time	Notes
1	Alex Porkhomovskiy	Russia	10.28	Q
2	Oleg Kramarenko	Ukraine	10.31	Q
3	Jason John	United Kingdom	10.37	Q
4	Peter Karlsson	Sweden	10.40	Q
5	Stefan Burkart	Switzerland	10.41	
6	Lasse Juusela	Finland	10.57	
7	Ezio Madonia	Italy	10.63	
8	Aléxios Alexópoulos	Greece	10.69	
			Wind: -0.3 m/s	

==== Heat 3 ====
Rank	Name	Nationality	Time	Notes
1	Geir Moen	Norway	10.27	Q
2	Marc Blume	Germany	10.31	Q
3	Daniel Cojocaru	Romania	10.31	Q
4	Patrick Stevens	Belgium	10.41	Q
5	Yiannios Zisimides	Cyprus	10.51	
6	Pedro Pablo Nolet	Spain	10.54	
7	Matias Ghansah	Sweden	10.55	
8	Pascal Thurnherr	Switzerland	10.71	
			Wind: +0.5 m/s	

==== Heat 4 ====
Rank	Name	Nationality	Time	Notes
1	Hermann Lomba	France	10.34	Q
2	Toby Box	United Kingdom	10.35	Q
3	Aléxandros Yenovélis	Greece	10.35	Q
4	Anninos Marcoullides	Cyprus	10.40	Q
5	Sandro Floris	Italy	10.41	
6	Andrey Grigoryev	Russia	10.47	
7	Dmitriy Vanyaikin	Ukraine	10.54	
8	Jukka Vähäkangas	Finland	10.63	
			Wind: +1.4 m/s	

=== Semi-finals ===
8 August

==== Semi-final 1 ====
Rank	Name	Nationality	Time	Notes
1	Linford Christie	United Kingdom	10.19	Q
2	Jason John	United Kingdom	10.39	Q
3	Daniel Cojocaru	Romania	10.45	Q
4	Aléxandros Terzián	Greece	10.46	Q
5	Hermann Lomba	France	10.49	
6	Patrick Stevens	Belgium	10.56	
7	David Dollé	Switzerland	10.59	
8	Kennet Kjensli	Norway	10.62	
			Wind: -0.7 m/s	

==== Semi-final 2 ====
Rank	Name	Nationality	Time	Notes
1	Geir Moen	Norway	10.20	Q
2	Alex Porkhomovskiy	Russia	10.26	Q
3	Oleg Kramarenko	Ukraine	10.34	Q
4	Marc Blume	Germany	10.38	Q
5	Peter Karlsson	Sweden	10.41	
6	Toby Box	United Kingdom	10.46	
7	Anninos Marcoullides	Cyprus	10.53	
8	Aléxandros Yenovélis	Greece	10.59	
			Wind: +1.7 m/s	

=== Final ===
8 August

Rank	Name	Nationality	Time	Notes
1st place, gold medalist(s)	Linford Christie	United Kingdom	10.14	
2nd place, silver medalist(s)	Geir Moen	Norway	10.20	
3rd place, bronze medalist(s)	Alex Porkhomovskiy	Russia	10.31	
4	Oleg Kramarenko	Ukraine	10.38	
5	Daniel Cojocaru	Romania	10.39	
6	Marc Blume	Germany	10.40	
7	Aléxandros Terzián	Greece	10.42	
8	Jason John	United Kingdom	10.46	
			Wind: -0.5 m/s	
