= 1992 European Athletics Indoor Championships – Men's 60 metres =

The men's 60 metres event at the 1992 European Athletics Indoor Championships was held in Palasport di Genova on 29 February.

== Medalists ==
Gold	Silver	Bronze
Jason Livingston; Great Britain	Vitaliy Savin; Unified Team	Michael Rosswess; Great Britain

== Results ==
=== Heats ===
First 3 from each heat (Q) and the next 4 fastest (q) qualified for the semifinals.

Rank	Heat	Name	Nationality	Time	Notes
1	2	Vitaliy Savin	Unified Team	6.62	Q
2	2	Daniel Sangouma	France	6.64	Q
3	3	Jason John	Great Britain	6.66	Q
4	3	Oleg Kramarenko	Unified Team	6.67	Q
5	1	Ezio Madonia	Italy	6.69	Q
5	3	Kennet Kjensli	Norway	6.69	Q, PB
7	1	Michael Rosswess	Great Britain	6.70	Q
7	3	Daniel Cojocaru	Romania	6.70	q
9	4	Mario Longo	Italy	6.72	Q
10	4	Jason Livingston	Great Britain	6.72	Q
11	1	David Dollé	Switzerland	6.73	Q
11	2	Sergio López	Spain	6.73	Q
11	3	Jiří Valík	Czechoslovakia	6.73	q
11	4	Pascal Théophile	France	6.73	Q
15	1	Luis Rodríguez	Spain	6.74	q
15	2	Franz Ratzenberger	Austria	6.74	q
17	3	Olivier Théophile	France	6.77	
18	4	Stefan Burkart	Switzerland	6.80	
19	1	Steffen Bringmann	Germany	6.81	
19	2	Frank Perri	Netherlands	6.81	
19	4	Vilmantas Pipiras	Lithuania	6.81	
22	4	Sven Matthes	Germany	6.84	
23	2	Yiannios Zisimides	Cyprus	6.88	
24	1	Andreas Berger	Austria	6.91	
25	2	Aleksandar Tomić	Yugoslavia	6.93	
26	1	Luís Cunha	Portugal	7.03	
27	3	Dominique Canti	San Marino	7.09	
28	4	Cengiz Kavaklıoğlu	Turkey	7.64	
29	3	Thomas Renner	Austria	8.36	

=== Semifinals ===
First 4 from each semifinal qualified directly (Q) for the final.

Rank	Heat	Name	Nationality	Time	Notes
1	2	Vitaliy Savin	Unified Team	6.54	Q
2	1	Jason Livingston	Great Britain	6.59	Q
3	2	Michael Rosswess	Great Britain	6.61	Q
4	2	Daniel Sangouma	France	6.64	Q
5	2	Mario Longo	Italy	6.65	Q
6	1	Jason John	Great Britain	6.67	Q
7	1	Ezio Madonia	Italy	6.67	Q
8	1	Oleg Kramarenko	Unified Team	6.71	Q
8	2	Kennet Kjensli	Norway	6.71	
10	1	Sergio López	Spain	6.72	
11	2	Daniel Cojocaru	Romania	6.74	
12	2	Jiří Valík	Czechoslovakia	6.75	
13	1	Franz Ratzenberger	Austria	6.76	
14	1	David Dollé	Switzerland	6.76	
15	1	Pascal Théophile	France	6.77	
15	2	Luis Rodríguez	Spain	6.77	

=== Final ===
Rank	Name	Nationality	Time	Notes
1st place, gold medalist(s)	Jason Livingston	Great Britain	6.53	
2nd place, silver medalist(s)	Vitaliy Savin	Unified Team	6.54	
3rd place, bronze medalist(s)	Michael Rosswess	Great Britain	6.62	
4	Ezio Madonia	Italy	6.63	
5	Daniel Sangouma	France	6.64	
6	Oleg Kramarenko	Unified Team	6.69	
7	Jason John	Great Britain	6.69	
8	Mario Longo	Italy	6.77	
