= 1993 World Championships in Athletics – Men's 100 metres =

Men's 100 metres at the 1993 World Championships
- Venue: Gottlieb Daimler Stadium
- Dates: 14 August (heats and quarter-finals); 15 August (semi-finals and final)
- Competitors: 70
- Winning time: 9.87

Medalists
| gold medal | Linford Christie | Great Britain |
| silver medal | Andre Cason | United States |
| bronze medal | Dennis Mitchell | United States |

These are the official results of the Men's 100 metres event at the 1993 IAAF World Championships in Stuttgart, Germany. There were a total number of 70 participating athletes, with nine qualifying heats and the final held on Sunday 1993-08-15.

At 33 years, 135 days old, Linford Christie became the oldest ever world champion for the men's 100 m.

== Final ==
| RANK | FINAL | TIME |
|---|---|---|
| | Linford Christie (GBR) | 9.87 ER |
| | Andre Cason (USA) | 9.92 |
| | Dennis Mitchell (USA) | 9.99 |
| 4. | Carl Lewis (USA) | 10.02 |
| 5. | Bruny Surin (CAN) | 10.02 |
| 6. | Frankie Fredericks (NAM) | 10.03 |
| 7. | Daniel Effiong (NGR) | 10.04 |
| 8. | Raymond Stewart (JAM) | 10.18 |

== Semifinals ==
- Held on Sunday 1993-08-15

| RANK | HEAT 1 | TIME |
|---|---|---|
| 1. | Andre Cason (USA) | 9.94 |
| 2. | Daniel Effiong (NGR) | 9.98 |
| 3. | Carl Lewis (USA) | 10.02 |
| 4. | Frankie Fredericks (NAM) | 10.05 |
| 5. | Atlee Mahorn (CAN) | 10.21 |
| 6. | Jason John (GBR) | 10.34 |
| 7. | Alexandros Terzian (GRE) | 10.36 |
| 8. | Satoru Inoue (JPN) | 10.39 |

| RANK | HEAT 2 | TIME |
|---|---|---|
| 1. | Linford Christie (GBR) | 9.97 |
| 2. | Dennis Mitchell (USA) | 10.06 |
| 3. | Bruny Surin (CAN) | 10.07 |
| 4. | Raymond Stewart (JAM) | 10.16 |
| 5. | Aleksandr Porkhomovskiy (RUS) | 10.20 |
| 6. | Emmanuel Tuffour (GHA) | 10.23 |
| 7. | Robert Esmie (CAN) | 10.23 |
| 8. | Oumar Loum (SEN) | 10.60 |

== Quarterfinals ==
- Held on Saturday 1993-08-14

| RANK | HEAT 1 | TIME |
|---|---|---|
| 1. | Carl Lewis (USA) | 10.11 |
| 2. | Robert Esmie (CAN) | 10.30 |
| 3. | Jason John (GBR) | 10.31 |
| 4. | Satoru Inoue (JPN) | 10.34 |
| 5. | Daniel Sangouma (FRA) | 10.47 |
| 6. | Jiri Valik (CZE) | 10.53 |
| 7. | Edmund Estaphane (LCA) | 10.57 |
| 8. | Driss Bensaddou (MAR) | 10.63 |

| RANK | HEAT 2 | TIME |
|---|---|---|
| 1. | Dennis Mitchell (USA) | 10.08 |
| 2. | Raymond Stewart (JAM) | 10.11 |
| 3. | Daniel Effiong (NGR) | 10.15 |
| 4. | Atlee Mahorn (CAN) | 10.20 |
| 5. | Marc Blume (GER) | 10.32 |
| 6. | Salaam Gariba (GHA) | 10.42 |
| 7. | Jean-Olivier Zirignon (CIV) | 10.44 |
| 8. | Marek Zalewski (POL) | 10.49 |

| RANK | HEAT 3 | TIME |
|---|---|---|
| 1. | Linford Christie (GBR) | 10.00 |
| 2. | Bruny Surin (CAN) | 10.07 |
| 3. | Aleksandr Porkhomovskiy (RUS) | 10.33 |
| 4. | Alexandros Terzian (GRE) | 10.34 |
| 5. | Vitaliy Savin (KAZ) | 10.36 |
| 6. | Ousmane Diarra (MLI) | 10.41 |
| 7. | Max Morinière (FRA) | 10.58 |
| 8. | Kirk Cummins (BAR) | 10.60 |

| RANK | HEAT 4 | TIME |
|---|---|---|
| 1. | Andre Cason (USA) | 9.96 |
| 2. | Frankie Fredericks (NAM) | 10.06 |
| 3. | Emmanuel Tuffour (GHA) | 10.26 |
| 4. | Oumar Loum (SEN) | 10.33 |
| 5. | Arnaldo da Silva (BRA) | 10.38 |
| 6. | Daniel Cojocaru (ROM) | 10.41 |
| 7. | Ato Boldon (TRI) | 10.48 |
| — | Fabian Muyaba (ZIM) | DNS |

== Qualifying heats ==
- Held on Saturday 1993-08-14

| RANK | HEAT 1 | TIME |
|---|---|---|
| 1. | Dennis Mitchell (USA) | 10.26 |
| 2. | Satoru Inoue (JPN) | 10.43 |
| 3. | Ato Boldon (TRI) | 10.51 |
| 4. | Edmund Estaphane (LCA) | 10.54 |
| 5. | Miguel Janssen (ARU) | 10.62 |
| 6. | Sun-Kuk Jin (KOR) | 10.66 |
| 7. | Ahmed Al-Moamari (OMA) | 10.78 |
| 8. | Arfin Abdullah (INA) | 11.11 |

| RANK | HEAT 2 | TIME |
|---|---|---|
| 1. | Frank Fredericks (NAM) | 10.32 |
| 2. | Alexandros Terzian (GRE) | 10.36 |
| 3. | Kirk Cummins (BAR) | 10.44 |
| 4. | Anvar Kuchmuradov (UZB) | 10.56 |
| 5. | Charles Tayot (GAB) | 10.82 |
| 6. | Cephas Lemba (ZAM) | 10.87 |
| 7. | A. Tamba (LBR) | 11.29 |
| | Stefan Burkart (SUI) | DNS |

| RANK | HEAT 3 | TIME |
|---|---|---|
| 1. | Linford Christie (GBR) | 10.24 |
| 2. | Arnaldo da Silva (BRA) | 10.41 |
| 3. | Daniel Cojocaru (ROM) | 10.49 |
| 4. | Stephen Lewis (MSR) | 10.59 |
| 5. | Junior Cornette (GUY) | 10.61 |
| 6. | David Nkoua (CGO) | 10.92 |
| | Gustavo Envela (GEQ) | DNS |

| RANK | HEAT 4 | TIME |
|---|---|---|
| 1. | Bruny Surin (CAN) | 10.23 |
| 2. | Emmanuel Tuffour (GHA) | 10.30 |
| 3. | Jean-Olivier Zirignon (CIV) | 10.38 |
| 4. | Abdulieh Janneh (GAM) | 10.66 |
| 5. | Abdolsadeh Gorgani (IRI) | 10.67 |
| 6. | Mario Bonello (MLT) | 11.05 |
| 7. | Lam Hai Van (VIE) | 11.28 |
| | Augustine Nketia (NZL) | DNS |

| RANK | HEAT 5 | TIME |
|---|---|---|
| 1. | Andre Cason (USA) | 10.09 |
| 2. | Daniel Sangouma (FRA) | 10.40 |
| 3. | Driss Bensaddou (MAR) | 10.51 |
| 4. | Enrique Talavera (ESP) | 10.58 |
| 5. | Wayne Watson (JAM) | 10.64 |
| 6. | Golam Ambia (BAN) | 10.72 |
| 7. | Theodore Haba (GUI) | 10.75 |
| 8. | Nouredine Ould Menira (MTN) | 10.96 |

| RANK | HEAT 6 | TIME |
|---|---|---|
| 1. | Carl Lewis (USA) | 10.15 |
| 2. | Marc Blume (GER) | 10.36 |
| 3. | Atlee Mahorn (CAN) | 10.55 |
| 4. | Sanusi Turay (SLE) | 10.68 |
| 5. | Hisatsugu Suzuki (JPN) | 10.72 |
| 6. | Ricky Canon (NRU) | 11.72 |
| 7. | Chehou Inzoudine Bakar (COM) | 11.99 |
| | Gaetan Desmangles (FRA) | DQ |

| RANK | HEAT 7 | TIME |
|---|---|---|
| 1. | Daniel Effiong (NGR) | 10.23 |
| 2. | Oumar Loum (SEN) | 10.41 |
| 3. | Jiri Valik (CZE) | 10.48 |
| 4. | Marek Zalewski (POL) | 10.49 |
| 5. | Miguel Miranda (MEX) | 10.71 |
| 6. | Trevor Davis (AIA) | 10.78 |
| 7. | Laurent Kemp (LUX) | 10.95 |

| RANK | HEAT 8 | TIME |
|---|---|---|
| 1. | Raymond Stewart (JAM) | 10.23 |
| 2. | Aleksandr Porkhomovskiy (RUS) | 10.36 |
| 3. | Salaam Gariba (GHA) | 10.38 |
| 4. | Max Moriniére (FRA) | 10.50 |
| 5. | Khalid Juma (BHR) | 10.93 |
| 6. | Eswort Coombs (VIN) | 10.95 |
| 7. | Mark Sherwin (COK) | 11.37 |
| | Saad Al-Matary (KUW) | DNS |

| RANK | HEAT 9 | TIME |
|---|---|---|
| 1. | Robert Esmie (CAN) | 10.30 |
| 2. | Jason John (GBR) | 10.34 |
| 3. | Vitaliy Savin (KAZ) | 10.35 |
| 4. | Ousmane Diarra (MLI) | 10.42 |
| 5. | Fabian Muyaba (ZIM) | 10.55 |
| 6. | Claus Hirsbro (DEN) | 10.78 |
| 7. | Danny Charles (SEY) | 11.00 |
| 8. | Bounhom Siliphone (LAO) | 11.46 |

== See also ==
- 1992 Men's Olympic 100 metres
