= Simpara =

Simpara is a surname. Notable people with the name include:

- Youssouf Simpara (born 1979), Malian sprinter
- Zoumana Simpara (born 1998), Malian footballer
