= Alexandros Terzian =

Armenian - Argentine - Greek sprinter

Personal information
- Born: 24 June 1968 (age 58) Buenos Aires

Sport
- Country: Greece
- Sport: Athletics
- Events: 100 m, 200m, 60 m

Achievements and titles
- Personal bests: 10.20 s, 20.61s, 6.51s
Medal record
European Indoor Championships
Silver medal – second place	1994 Paris	60 metres
Mediterranean Games
Gold medal – first place	1993 Narbonne	100 metres
Silver medal – second place	1993 Narbonne	200 metres
Silver medal – second place	1993 Narbonne	4x100 metres

Alexandros Terzian (born Alejandro Terzian on 24 June 1968 in Buenos Aires) is a retired Armenian - Argentine - Greek sprinter.

Terzian, competing for Argentina, won the national title of that country in 100 metres in 1989 and in both 100 and 200 metres in 1990. He then moved to Greece, taking his first national titles there in 1993.

The same year, Terzian won the 100 m at the 1993 Mediterranean Games, in what would be his career best time of 10.20 seconds. He also won the silver medal in 200 m at the same Games. He also competed at the World Indoor Championships and the World Championships without reaching the final.

In 1994, Terzian won the silver medal in 60 metres at the European Indoor Championships in a national Greek indoor record of 6.51 seconds, and finished seventh at the outdoor European Championships with 10.42.

His personal best time in 200 metres was 20.61 seconds, achieved in May 1997 in Piraeus. This places him tenth as of 2018 on the Greek all-time performers list of 200 metres.

== Competition record ==
Year	Competition	Venue	Position	Event	Notes
Representing Argentina
1987	South American Junior Championships	Santiago, Chile	2nd	High jump	1.95 m
Representing Greece
1993	World Indoor Championships	Toronto, Canada	11th (sf)	60 m	6.72
1993	Mediterranean Games	Narbonne, France	1st	100 m	10.20
1993	Mediterranean Games	Narbonne, France	2nd	200 m	20.87
1993	Mediterranean Games	Narbonne, France	2nd	4 × 100 m relay	39.26
1993	World Championships	Stuttgart, Germany	14th (sf)	100 m	10.36
1993	World Championships	Stuttgart, Germany	22nd (qf)	200 m	21.00
1993	World Championships	Stuttgart, Germany	10th (sf)	4 × 100 m relay	39.00
1994	European Indoor Championships	Paris, France	2nd	60 m	6.51
1994	European Championships	Helsinki, Finland	7th	100 m	10.42
1994	European Championships	Helsinki, Finland	5th	4 × 100 m relay	39.25
1995	World Championships	Gothenburg, Sweden	38th (h)	100 m	10.47
1995	World Championships	Gothenburg, Sweden	–	4 × 100 m relay	DQ
1996	Olympic Games	Atlanta, United States	49th (h)	100 m	10.48
1997	Mediterranean Games	Bari, Italy	4th	200 m	20.67
