= Kennet Kjensli =

Norwegian sprinter (born 1969)

Personal information
- Born: 12 March 1969 (age 56)

Sport
- Sport: Athletics
- Event(s): 60 m, 100 m

Kennet Kjensli (born 10 March 1969) is a Norwegian athlete who competed in sprinting events. He represented his country at two World Indoor Championships, in 1993 and 1995, reaching the semifinals on the first occasion.

== International competitions ==
Year	Competition	Venue	Position	Event	Notes
Representing Norway
1989	European Indoor Championships	The Hague, Netherlands	19th (h)	60 m	6.84
1990	European Indoor Championships	Glasgow, United Kingdom	18th (h)	60 m	6.83
1990	European Championships	Split, Yugoslavia	–	4 × 100 m relay	DNF
1992	European Indoor Championships	Genoa, Italy	8th (sf)	60 m	6.71
1993	World Indoor Championships	Toronto, Canada	11th (sf)	60 m	6.72
1994	European Indoor Championships	Paris, France	11th (sf)	60 m	6.75
1994	European Championships	Helsinki, Finland	16th (sf)	100 m	10.62
1995	World Indoor Championships	Barcelona, Spain	29th (h)	60 m	6.82

== Personal bests ==
Outdoor

- 100 metres – 10.26 (+0.5 m/s, Lappeenranta 1994)

Indoor

- 60 metres – 6.69 (Genoa 1992)
