= Daniel Cojocaru =

Romanian sprinter

Personal information
- Born: 27 May 1969 (age 57)

Sport
- Sport: Track and field

Daniel Cojocaru (born 27 May 1969) is a retired Romanian athlete who specialised in the sprinting events. He represented his country at the 1992 Summer Olympics, as well as three consecutive World Championships starting in 1991. His best individual result was the fifth place at the 1994 European Championships.

His 100 metres personal best of 10.21 is the current national record.

== Competition record ==
Year	Competition	Venue	Position	Event	Notes
Representing Romania
1991	World Indoor Championships	Seville, Spain	10th (sf)	200 m	21.41
1991	World Championships	Tokyo, Japan	34th (h)	100 m	10.51
1991	World Championships	Tokyo, Japan	18th (qf)	200 m	20.80
1992	European Indoor Championships	Genoa, Italy	11th (sf)	60 m	6.74
1992	European Indoor Championships	Genoa, Italy	9th (sf)	200 m	21.61
1992	Olympic Games	Barcelona, Spain	25th (qf)	100 m	10.57
1992	Olympic Games	Barcelona, Spain	26th (qf)	200 m	20.96
1993	World Indoor Championships	Toronto, Canada	11th (sf)	60 m	6.72
1993	World Indoor Championships	Toronto, Canada	16th (sf)	200 m	21.39
1993	World Championships	Stuttgart, Germany	20th (qf)	100 m	10.41
1993	World Championships	Stuttgart, Germany	34th (h)	200 m	21.13
1994	European Indoor Championships	Paris, France	8th (sf)	60 m	6.73
1994	European Indoor Championships	Paris, France	–	200 m	DNF
1994	European Championships	Helsinki, Finland	5th	100 m	10.39
1994	European Championships	Helsinki, Finland	–	200 m	DNF
1995	World Indoor Championships	Barcelona, Spain	20th (sf)	60 m	6.78
1995	World Indoor Championships	Barcelona, Spain	13th (sf)	200 m	21.74
1995	World Championships	Gothenburg, Sweden	60th (h)	100 m	10.67
1995	World Championships	Gothenburg, Sweden	46th (h)	200 m	21.09
1995	Universiade	Fukuoka, Japan	15th (sf)	100 m	10.65
1995	Universiade	Fukuoka, Japan	7th	200 m	20.97
1998	European Indoor Championships	Valencia, Spain	22nd (h)	60 m	6.73
1998	European Indoor Championships	Valencia, Spain	27th (h)	200 m	21.62

== Personal bests ==
Outdoor

- 100 metres – 10.21 (+0.2 m/s) (Bucharest 1994) NR
- 200 metres – 20.75 (-0.4 m/s) (Bucharest, 1994)
- 400 metres – 46.91 (Alexandroupoli 1988)

Indoor

- 60 metres – 6.63 (Bucharest 1998)
- 100 metres – 10.53 (Jablonec nad Nisou 1995)
- 200 metres – 21.09 (Piraeus 1995)
