= Darren Tuitt =

Track and field athlete

Darren Tuitt (born March 5, 1980) is a former track and field athlete, primarily known as a sprinter. He represented Montserrat internationally. He ran in the 100 metres at the 1995 World Championships, finishing seventh in his qualifying heat. By running in that race, he became the youngest male participant in history of the World Championships at 15 years 153 days of age. He returned to the World Championships six years later, running the 200 metres in 2001.

Tuitt ran collegially in the United States, representing East Carolina University. In 2002, he led off the East Carolina 4×100 metres relay team that finished seventh in the NCAA Championships, thereby earning All American honors.
