= Nelson Lucas =

Seychellois sprinter

Personal information
- Nationality: Seychellois
- Born: 30 June 1979 (age 47)
- Height: 1.82 m (6 ft 0 in)
- Weight: 68 kg (150 lb)

Sport
- Sport: Track and field
- Event: Sprints

Nelson Lucas (born 30 June 1979) is a Seychellois former sprinter.

Running in the men's 100 metres at the 2000 Summer Olympics in Sydney, he finished ninth in heat eleven of the qualifications with a time of 11.15 seconds and did not progress to the semi-finals. Lucas was a member of the 4x100 relay squad which set the Seychellois national record at the 1998 Indian Ocean Island Games in Saint-Paul, Réunion.
