= Pavel Galkin =

Russian sprinter

Personal information
- Born: 9 October 1968 (age 57)
- Height: 1.86 m (6 ft 1 in)
- Weight: 79 kg (174 lb)

Sport
- Sport: Track and field
- Events: 100 metres, 60 metres

Pavel Stanislavovich Galkin (Russian: Павел Станиславович Галкин; born 9 October 1968) is a retired Russian athlete who specialised in the sprinting events. He competed for the Unified Team at the 1992 Summer Olympics.

His personal best in the 100 metres is 10.20 set in 1994.

== Competition record ==
Year	Competition	Venue	Position	Event	Notes
Representing the Soviet Union
1990	Goodwill Games	Seattle, United States	7th	100 m	10.42
1990	Goodwill Games	Seattle, United States	3rd	4x100 m relay	38.96
1990	European Championships	Split, Yugoslavia	10th (h)	100 m	10.46
Representing the Unified Team
1992	Olympic Games	Barcelona, Spain	18th (qf)	100 m	10.37
1992	Olympic Games	Barcelona, Spain	5th	4x100 m relay	38.17
Representing Russia
1993	World Championships	Stuttgart, Germany	–	4x100 m relay	DQ
1994	European Indoor Championships	Paris, France	7th (sf)	60 m	6.70
1995	World Championships	Gothenburg, Sweden	9th (sf)	4x100 m relay	38.78
1996	European Indoor Championships	Stockholm, Sweden	18th (h)	60 m	6.80
