= Jason John (athlete) =

English sprinter (born 1971)

Personal information
- Nationality: British (English)
- Born: 17 October 1971 (age 55) Birmingham, England
- Height: 184 cm (6 ft 0 in)
- Weight: 77 kg (170 lb)

Sport
- Sport: Athletics
- Event: Sprints
- Club: Newham and Essex Beagles
Medal record
Athletics
Representing England
Commonwealth Games
Bronze medal – third place	1994 Victoria	4x100m relay

Jason John (born 17 October 1971) is an English former sprinter. He represented Great Britain at the 1992 Summer Olympics and won relay silver at the 1993 World Championships and bronze for England at the 1994 Commonwealth Games.

== Biography ==
Born in Birmingham, John attended Handsworth Grammar School, and went on to become an English and P.E teacher at Anthony Gell School.

John represented Great Britain at the 1992 Olympics in Barcelona and won a silver medal in the 4 x 100 metres relay at the 1993 World Championships (he ran in the heats and semis but not the final). He also won a silver medal at the 1996 European Indoor Championships and reached the final at the 1993 World Indoor Championships. In addition, he represented his country at two World Championships, in 1993 and 1995.

He represented England and won a bronze medal in the 4 x 100 metres relay event, at the 1994 Commonwealth Games in Victoria, Canada.

John finished second behind Darren Braithwaite in the 200 metres event at the 1995 AAA Championships.

== Competition record ==
Year	Competition	Venue	Position	Event	Notes
Representing Great Britain and England
1990	World Junior Championships	Plovdiv, Bulgaria	4th	100 m	10.40 (wind: +0.6 m/s)
1990	World Junior Championships	Plovdiv, Bulgaria	4th	4 × 100 m relay	39.78
1992	European Indoor Championships	Genoa, Italy	7th	60 m	6.69
1992	Olympic Games	Barcelona, Spain	8th (h)	4 × 100 m relay	39.73
1993	World Indoor Championships	Toronto, Canada	5th (sf)	100 m	6.60
1993	World Indoor Championships	Toronto, Canada	14th (h)	200 m	21.25
1993	World Championships	Stuttgart, Germany	13th (sf)	100 m	10.34
1993	World Championships	Stuttgart, Germany	3rd (sf)	4 × 100 m relay	38.05
1994	European Championships	Helsinki, Finland	8th	100 m	10.46
1994	European Championships	Helsinki, Finland	–	4 × 100 m relay	DNF
1994	Commonwealth Games	Victoria, Canada	5th (qf)	100 m	10.29
1994	Commonwealth Games	Victoria, Canada	3rd	4 × 100 m relay	39.39
1995	World Championships	Gothenburg, Sweden	20th (qf)	100 m	10.39
1996	European Indoor Championships	Stockholm, Sweden	2nd	60 m	6.64

== Personal bests ==
Outdoor

- 100 metres – 10.23 (+1.2 m/s) (London 1994)
- 200 metres – 20.86 (+0.6 m/s) (Birmingham 1995)

Indoor

- 60 metres – 6.60 (Birmingham 1993)
- 200 metres – 21.25 (Toronto 1993)
