= Marc Blume =

German sprinter

Personal information
- Born: 28 December 1973 (age 52) Lüdinghausen, North Rhine-Westphalia, West Germany
- Height: 1.80 m (5 ft 11 in)

Sport
- Country: Germany
- Sport: Athletics
- Event: 100 metres

Achievements and titles
- Personal bests: 60 metres: 6.54; 100 metres: 10.13; 200 metres: 20.47
Medal record
Men's athletics
Representing Germany
European Championships
Bronze medal – third place	2002 Munich	4×100 m
European Indoor Championships
Gold medal – first place	1996 Stockholm	60 m

Marc Blume (born 28 December 1973 in Lüdinghausen) is a German sprinter who specialised in the 100 metres.

== Biography ==
He is the twin brother of Holger Blume. Both represented the sports club TV Wattenscheid. With a personal best of 10.13 seconds, Blume is fifth on the German all-time list.

== Achievements ==
Year	Competition	Venue	Position	Event	Notes
Representing Germany
1992	World Junior Championships	Seoul, South Korea	6th	100m	10.57 (wind: 0.0 m/s)
1992	World Junior Championships	Seoul, South Korea	11th (h)	4 × 100 m relay	43.93
1993	World Championships	Stuttgart, Germany	5th (quarterfinals)	100 m	10.32, PB
1993	World Championships	Stuttgart, Germany	6th	4 × 100 m relay	38.78
1994	European Championships	Helsinki, Finland	6th	100m	10.40 (wind: -0.5 m/s) SB
1994	European Championships	Helsinki, Finland	6th	4 × 100 m relay	39.36
1995	World Indoors	Barcelona, Spain	5th	60 m	6.59, PB
1995	World Championships	Gothenburg, Sweden	7th (quarterfinals)	100 m	10.40
1995	World Championships	Gothenburg, Sweden	5th (heats)	200 m	20.86, PB
1996	European Indoors	Stockholm, Sweden	1st	60 m	6.62
1996	Summer Olympics	Atlanta, United States	6th (quarterfinals)	100 m	10.33
1996	Summer Olympics	Atlanta, United States	—N/a	4 × 100 m relay	DNF
1997	World Indoors	Paris, France	2nd (heats)	60 m	6.67
1998	European Championships	Budapest, Hungary	5th	4 × 100 m relay	39.09, SB
1998	World Cup	Johannesburg, South Africa	7th	100 m	10.30, SB
1998	World Cup	Johannesburg, South Africa	7th	4 × 100 m relay	38.89
1999	World Indoors	Maebashi, Japan	11th	60 m	6.59
1999	World Championships	Seville, Spain	4th (heats)	4 × 100 m relay	38.84
2000	European Indoors	Ghent, Belgium	=11th	60 m	6.74
2000	Summer Olympics	Sydney, Australia	=36th	100 m	10.42
2002	European Indoors	Vienna, Austria	10th	60 m	6.70
2002	European Indoors	Vienna, Austria	—N/a	200 m	DNF
2002	European Championships	Munich, Germany	12th	100 m	10.38
2002	European Championships	Munich, Germany	3rd	4 × 100 m relay	38.88
2002	World Cup	Madrid, Spain	7th	100 m	10.46
2002	World Cup	Madrid, Spain	—	4 × 100 m relay	DSQ
2003	World Championships	Paris, France	—N/a	4 × 100 m relay	DNF
2005	European Indoors	Madrid, Spain	10th	60 m	6.71
2005	World Championships	Helsinki, Finland	7th	4 × 100 m relay	38.48, SB

== See also ==
- German all-time top lists – 100 metres
