= Alexandros Yenovelis =

Greek sprinter

Personal information
- Born: 26 February 1968 (age 58)
Medal record
Men's Athletics
Representing Greece
Mediterranean Games
Silver medal – second place	1993 Narbonne	4×100 metres

Alexandros Yenovelis (born 26 February 1968) is a retired Greek sprinter who specialized in the 100 metres.

He competed in relay at the 1996 Olympic Games and the World Championships in 1993, 1995 and 1997, and in the individual distance at the 1993 and 1995 World Indoor Championships, without reaching the final.

His personal best time was 10.15 seconds, achieved in May 1996 in Rethimno. This ranks him fourth among Greek 100 metres sprinters, behind Angelos Pavlakakis, Aristotelis Gavelas and Christoforos Choidis.

== Honours ==
Year	Competition	Venue	Position	Event	Notes
Representing Greece
1993	Mediterranean Games	Narbonne, France	2nd	4 × 100 m relay	39.26
1993	World Championships	Stuttgart, Germany	10th (sf)	4 × 100 m relay	39.00
1994	European Championships	Helsinki, Finland	14th (sf)	100m	10.59 (wind: +1.7 m/s)
1994	European Championships	Helsinki, Finland	5th	4 × 100 m relay	39.25
1996	Olympic Games	Atlanta, USA	26th (h)	100 m	10.34
1998	European Championships	Budapest, Hungary	4th	4 × 100 m relay	39.07
