= Michael Marsh (sprinter) =

American sprinter

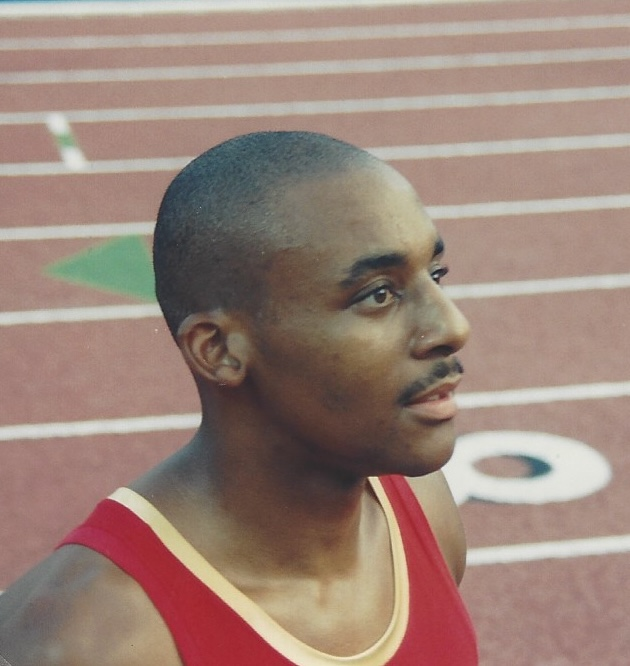
- Marsh in 1992

Personal information
- Nationality: American
- Born: August 4, 1967 (age 59) Los Angeles, California, U.S.
- Height: 5 ft 10 in (1.78 m)
- Weight: 150 lb (68 kg)

Sport
- Sport: Running
- Events: 100 metres, 200 metres
- College team: UCLA Bruins
- Club: Santa Monica Track Club
Medal record
Men's athletics (track and field)
Representing the United States
Olympic Games
Gold medal – first place	1992 Barcelona	200 metres
Gold medal – first place	1992 Barcelona	4 × 100 metres relay
Silver medal – second place	1996 Atlanta	4 × 100 metres relay
World Championships
Gold medal – first place	1991 Tokyo	4 × 100 metres relay
Summer Universiade
Gold medal – first place	1987 Zagreb	4 x 100 metres relay
Gold medal – first place	1989 Duisburg	4 x 100 metres relay

Michael Lawrence Marsh (born August 4, 1967) is a retired American sprinter, the 1992 Olympic champion in the 200 m.

== Biography ==
Marsh was born in Los Angeles, and attended high school at Hawthorne High School in Hawthorne, California where he was overshadowed by Henry Thomas, who he joined on numerous championship relays. Marsh, Thomas, Michael Graham and Sean Kelly joined to bring Hawthorne the National High School Record in the 4 × 400 m relay set at the Texas Relays. The team joined to celebrate the silver anniversary of the record in 2010. When Thomas was sidelined with an appendix attack, requiring surgery just before the qualification cycle, Marsh won the 1985 CIF California State Meet in the 200 m. He continued running with Thomas at UCLA, his best achievement was a third place at the NCAA Championships. He was inducted into the UCLA Athletics Hall of Fame in 2016.

Although Marsh could compete with the national class sprinters, he did not manage to qualify for an international event until 1991, when he qualified for the American relay team for the 1991 World Championships. Marsh ran in the heats on a team that set the Championship record, but not in the final, which was won by the Americans in World Record time. The next year, Marsh posted a time of 9.93s into a wind of 0.6 m/s at the Mt. SAC Relays in Walnut, which using a widely accepted wind/altitude correction calculator adjusted to the fastest ever intrinsic 100 m time recorded at that time in history. That was the second of what became a trend, a succession of eight early season outstanding 100 m marks set by Marsh at the Mt. SAC Relays. Marsh was elected into the Mt. SAC Relays Hall of Fame in 2003.

At the 1992 US Olympic Trials, Marsh disappointingly finished fourth in the 100 m, not enough for individual qualification, but sufficient to make the relay team. In the 200 m, he placed second to Michael Johnson and qualified for the Barcelona Olympics,.

In Barcelona, Marsh surprised all observers in his semi-final. He cruised through the race, simply securing qualification for the final. His qualifying time, however, was 19.73, just one hundredth of a second slower than the standing world record (and it was the American Record). This run was remarkable for the fact that he eased off ten metres from the line, stating in later interviews that he hadn't realised how fast he was running and wanted to save some energy for the final, which was to be held only a few hours later. See the race. Unofficial split analysis from video of that run indicates he would have run faster than the world record at the time, Pietro Mennea's altitude-assisted 19.72s, if he hadn't eased off. An improvement of this record was anticipated for the final, but Marsh could not live up to those expectations. He did win the race however, beating early leader Frankie Fredericks of Namibia. He did set a world record in the final of the 4 × 100 m, as the American team completed the race in 37.40.

As the reigning Olympic champion, he surprisingly did not medal in the 200 m at the 1993 World Championships, placing fourth. His 1994 season went without a win, but he did lead off the Santa Monica Track Club's 4 × 200 m relay at the Mt. SAC Relays when the team of Marsh, Leroy Burrell, Floyd Heard and Carl Lewis set a world record in the event that would stand until 2014. He returned strongly in 1995. He won the national championships in the 100 m, and represented his country in that event at the World Championships. There, he disappointed, finishing fifth in the final. The disappointment was complete when the relay team failed to finish the heats after a bad exchange.

In 1996, Marsh managed to qualify for all three sprint events at the 1996 Summer Olympics in Atlanta, and he reached the final of all three. In the 100 m, he placed fifth and in his attempt to retain his 200 m title (which was taken by Johnson in a new world record time) he finished last. The American relay team, with Marsh as the third runner, was heavily favoured to take the 4 × 100 m title, but they were surprised by the Canadian team in the final, and had to settle for silver.

He again qualified for the 100 m final at the 1997 World Championships, where he placed last due to a foot injury that required immediate surgery.

In 2021 he was elected into the National Track and Field Hall of Fame.

=== Track records ===
As of September 2024, Marsh holds the following track records for 100 metres and 200 metres.

==== 100 metres ====
Location	Time	Windspeed m/s	Date
Raleigh, North Carolina	10.01	+0.2	17/06/2000
San Jose, California	9.99	+2.2	30/05/1992

==== 200 metres ====
Location	Time	Windspeed m/s	Date	Notes
Barcelona	19.73; PB	–0.2	05/08/1992	Former sea-level WR, Olympic record and AR
Sestriere	19.79	+4.0	21/07/1992	

Achievements
Preceded by (United States) Michael Johnson	Men's 200 m Best Year Performance; 1992	Succeeded by (Namibia) Frankie Fredericks
