= Youssouf Simpara =

Malian sprinter (born 1979)

Youssouf Simpara (born 30 June 1979) is a former Malian sprinter who competed in the 2000 Summer Olympics in the men's 100m competition, achieving a time of 10.82 in his first heat, not enough to advance.
