= Jon Drummond =

American sprinter (born 1968)

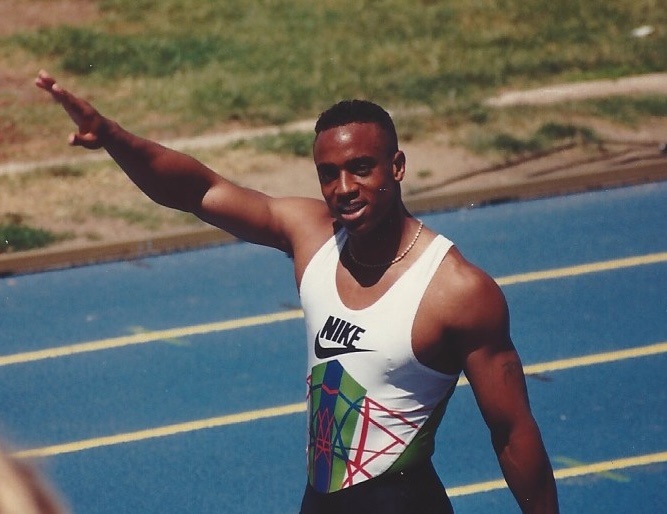

Personal information
- Born: September 9, 1968 (age 57) Philadelphia, Pennsylvania, U.S.
- Height: 5 ft 9 in (1.75 m)
- Weight: 160 lb (73 kg)

Sport
- Sport: Track and field
- Events: 100 metres, 200 metres
- College team: Texas Christian University
- Club: Nike
- Coached by: Darrell Smith
Medal record
Men's athletics
Representing the United States
Olympic Games
Gold medal – first place	2000 Sydney	4 × 100 metres relay
Silver medal – second place	1996 Atlanta	4 × 100 metres relay
World Championships
Gold medal – first place	1993 Stuttgart	4 × 100 metres relay
Gold medal – first place	1999 Seville	4 × 100 metres relay
Universiade
Gold medal – first place	1991 Sheffield	200 metres
Gold medal – first place	1991 Sheffield	4 × 100 metres relay

Jonathan A. Drummond (born September 9, 1968) is an American athlete, winner of gold medal in 4 × 100 m relay at the 2000 Summer Olympics.

== Career ==
Born in Philadelphia, Pennsylvania, Jon Drummond, a graduate of Overbrook High School, is known for being among the world's best starters. He is also well known for what could be called showmanship or taunting depending on one's perspective. Drummond has been called the "Clown Prince" of Track and Field.

Drummond first competed in the NJCAA for Odessa College. He then transferred to the TCU Horned Frogs track and field team where he pledged Kappa Alpha Psi Fraternity to compete in the NCAA.

His "showmanship" was visible with his membership in the HSI enclave, along with training partners Maurice Greene and Ato Boldon.

In 1991, Drummond won the 200 m at the World University Games and the British AAA Championships title at the 1991 AAA Championships. At the 1993 World Championships, Drummond ran the opening leg on the American 4 × 100 m relay team, which won the gold medal and equalled the world record of 37.40. At the 1995 World Championships, he ran the second leg on the American 4 × 100 m relay team, which did not finish its heat after Drummond and Tony McCall failed to complete their pass.

Drummond was the opening leg of the silver medal-winning American 4 × 100 m relay team at the 1996 Summer Olympics and reached the semi-finals of 100 m. In 1997, Drummond won his only US National Championships title in 200 m and at the World Championships, Drummond was seventh in 200 m. In 1999, Drummond suffered a third case of spinal meningitis but managed to recover to run the opening leg in a gold medal-winning American 4 × 100 m relay team at the 1999 World Championships.

At the Sydney Olympics, Drummond was fifth in 100 m and ran again the opening leg on the American 4 × 100 m relay team, which won the gold medal. At the 2001 World Championships, Drummond was again selected to run the first leg in relay, but suffered a torn right quadriceps halfway to passing the baton to Mickey Grimes in the first round and did not run in the final. He did however complete the pass to Grimes in first place allowing the team to continue onto the finals.

In 2002, Drummond was fourth in 100 m and won the 4 × 100 m relay in the IAAF World Cup.

At the 2003 World Championships, he was disqualified in the quarterfinals of 100 m for a false start. However, he contested that he did not false start, repeatedly shouting "I did not move". He delayed competition for almost an hour by refusing to leave the Paris track where the meet was being held. He protested for a period of time by lying down on the track. He eventually left the track of his own volition, reportedly in tears. It is one of a number of cases which relate to the revised false-start policies.

== After retirement ==
At the 2012 London Olympics, Drummond was the relay coach for the U.S. Track Team. The men's 4 × 100 metres relay team equalled the existing world record in the Olympics, though were defeated by a new world record by Jamaica. The women's team won and crushed the world record. In an event where improvements are normally recorded in hundredths of a second, the team knocked more than a half a second off the record that had stood for more than a quarter of a century.

Drummond worked as a fitness trainer at Daired's Pangea Spa in Arlington, Texas. He also formerly coached sprinter Tyson Gay.

He is also a member of Kappa Alpha Psi fraternity and was formerly a member of Kirk Franklin's gospel group The Family.

He has also followed in his minister father's footsteps as pastor at Noville Memorial Church of God in Christ in Philadelphia.

He was Inducted into the Texas Track and Field Coaches Hall of Fame, Class of 2014.

In 2014, Tyson Gay, Drummond's former athlete tested positive for performance-enhancing drugs. Drummond was implicated, as it was alleged Drummond "encouraged his use of the banned products and transported them for him." The investigation resulted in an eight-year ban from the sport for Drummond. Drummond was banned until December 16, 2022.

== Personal Bests ==
Distance	Time	Venue
100 m	9.92 secs	Indianapolis (12 June 1997)
200 m	20.03 secs	Brussels (August 1997)
