= Ato Boldon =

Trinidadian Olympic sprinter and politician

Ato Jabari Boldon OLY
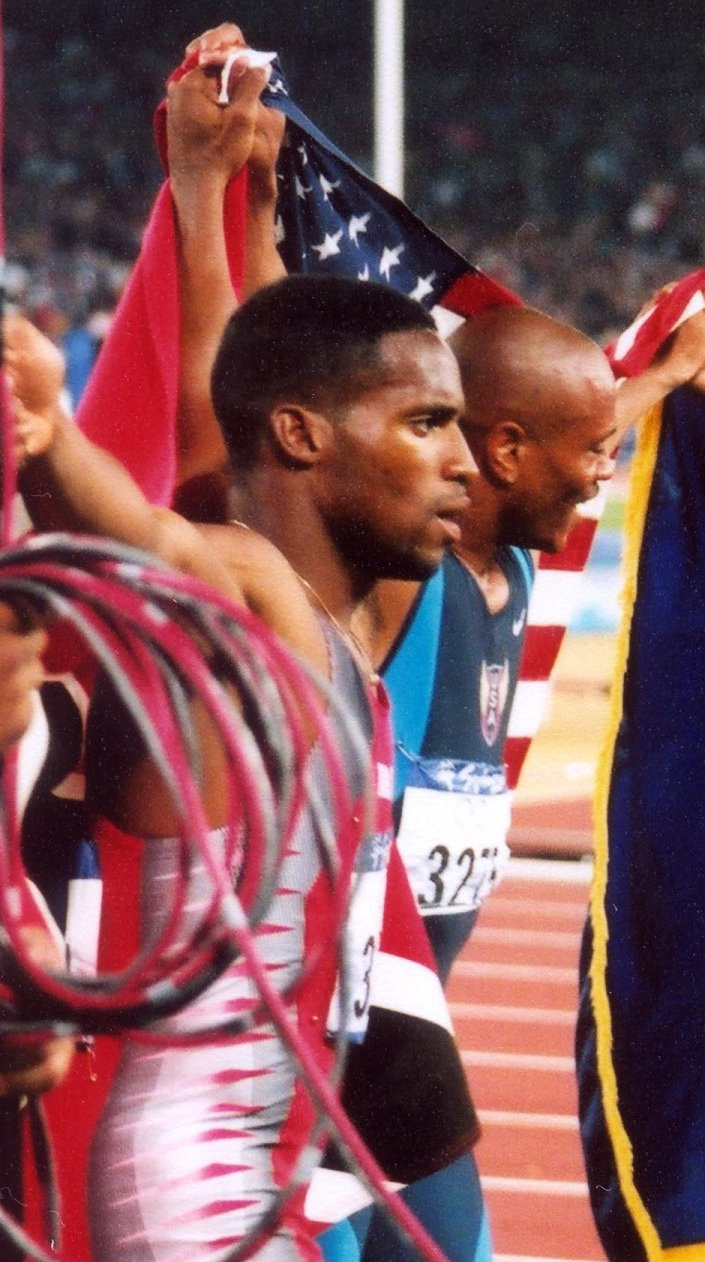
- Boldon at the Sydney 2000 Olympics

Member of the Senate of Trinidad and Tobago
- In office 14 February 2006 – 23 April 2007
- Preceded by: Roy Augustus
- Succeeded by: Ronald Phillip

Personal details
- Born: Ato Jabari Boldon; 30 December 1973 (age 52) Port of Spain, Trinidad and Tobago
- Party: United National Congress
- Sports career
- Height: 176 cm (5 ft 9 in)
- Weight: 75 kg (165 lb)
- Sport: Sprinting
- Events: 100 metres, 200 metres
- College team: UCLA

Sports achievements and titles
- Personal bests: 100 m: 9.86 s (Lausanne 1999); 200 m: 19.77 s (Stuttgart 1997)
Medal record
Men's athletics
Representing Trinidad and Tobago
Olympic Games
| Silver medal – second place | 2000 Sydney | 100 m |
| Bronze medal – third place | 1996 Atlanta | 100 m |
| Bronze medal – third place | 1996 Atlanta | 200 m |
| Bronze medal – third place | 2000 Sydney | 200 m |
World Championships
| Gold medal – first place | 1997 Athens | 200 m |
| Silver medal – second place | 2001 Edmonton | 4 × 100 m relay |
| Bronze medal – third place | 1995 Gothenburg | 100 m |
| Bronze medal – third place | 2001 Edmonton | 100 m |
Pan American Games
| Silver medal – second place | 2003 Santo Domingo | 4 × 100 m relay |
Commonwealth Games
| Gold medal – first place | 1998 Kuala Lumpur | 100 m |
Goodwill Games
| Gold medal – first place | 1998 New York City | 200 m |
| Silver medal – second place | 1998 New York City | 100 m |
World Junior Championships
| Gold medal – first place | 1992 Seoul | 100 m |
| Gold medal – first place | 1992 Seoul | 200 m |
CAC Junior Championships (U20)
| Gold medal – first place | 1992 Tegucigalpa | 100 m |
| Gold medal – first place | 1992 Tegucigalpa | 200 m |

Ato Jabari Boldon (born 30 December 1973) is a Trinidadian former track and field athlete, politician, and four-time Olympic medal winner. He holds the Trinidad and Tobago national record in the 50, 60 and 200 metres events with times of 5.64, 6.49 and 19.77 seconds respectively, and also the Commonwealth Games record in the 100 m. He also held the 100 m national record at 9.86 s, having run it four times until Richard Thompson ran 9.85 s on 13 August 2011.

After retiring from his track career, Boldon was an Opposition Senator in the Trinidad and Tobago Parliament, representing the United National Congress from 2006 to 2007. Boldon works as an NBC Sports television broadcast analyst for track and field.

== Career ==
=== Early life and junior career ===
Boldon was born in Port of Spain, Trinidad and Tobago to a Jamaican mother, and Trinidadian father, Hope and Guy Boldon. He attended Fatima College (secondary school) in Trinidad before leaving for the United States at age fourteen. In December 1989, as a soccer player at Jamaica High School in Queens, New York City, head track and field coach Joe Trupiano noticed his sprinting abilities during a soccer practice session.

In his first track season at age 16, Boldon finished with 21.20 seconds in the 200 metres and 48.40 seconds in the 400 metres, recording a double win at the Queens County Championships in 1990, and earning MVP honours. After transferring for his final year from Jamaica High to Piedmont Hills High School in San Jose, California, Boldon was selected to the San Jose Mercury News' Santa Clara all-county soccer team. He also continued to sprint, placing third in the 200 m at the CIF California State Meet in 1991. Athletics became his primary focus and he won the Junior Olympic Title that summer in Durham, North Carolina, in 200 m.

At 18, Boldon represented Trinidad and Tobago at 100 metres and 200 m in the 1992 Summer Olympics in Barcelona but did not qualify in the first round of either event. Boldon returned to the junior circuit, winning the 100 m and 200 m titles at the IAAF World Junior Championships in Athletics in Seoul, South Korea, to become the first double sprint champion in World Junior Championships history.

Boldon began his collegiate career at San Jose City College, where he was a 3C2A champion over 100 m and 200 m. Boldon was also an NCAA Champion while enrolled as a sociology major at the University of California at Los Angeles (UCLA) in 1995 in the 200 m. In 1996, he secured an NCAA 100 m Championship in Eugene, Oregon in the final race of his collegiate career, setting an NCAA meet record of 9.92. Boldon also held the collegiate 100 m record with 9.90 s from 1996 until it was broken by Travis Padgett, who ran 9.89 s, in 2008. Ngonidzashe Makusha later equalled this record at the 2011 NCAA Championships in Des Moines, Iowa.

=== Senior athletics ===
Boldon won his first international senior-level medal at the 1995 World Championships, taking home the bronze in the 100 m. At the time, he was the youngest athlete ever at 21 years of age to win a medal in that event. The following year at the 1996 Summer Olympics, he again placed third in the 100 m and 200 m events, both behind world records. In 1997, he won the 200 m at the World Championships in Athens, Greece; his country's first world title in the Athletics World Championships. This made him one of only a few male sprinters to win both a World Junior and World Senior title.

The following year saw Boldon reaching the peak of his career, setting a new personal best and national record of 9.86 s in the 100 m at the Mt. SAC Relays in Walnut, California on 19 April and repeating the feat in Athens on 17 June. He picked up gold in the 100 m at the 1998 Commonwealth Games held in Kuala Lumpur, Malaysia, setting a record time of 9.88 s, beating Namibia's Frankie Fredericks (9.96 s) and Barbados' Obadele Thompson (10.00 s). The Commonwealth Games 100 m record remains unbroken.

In 1999, Boldon ran 9.86 s twice in the 100 m before sustaining a serious hamstring injury which forced him to miss the World Championships in Seville – the only championship he missed in his career due to injury.

A silver medal in the 100 m and a bronze in the 200 m were Boldon's results of the 2000 Summer Olympics, which was a personal victory, considering his comeback from a career-threatening injury the year before. This win made him the most successful individual Olympic medallist from Trinidad and Tobago with four Olympic medals.

In 2001, Boldon tested positive at an early-season relay meet for the stimulant ephedrine, and was given a warning, but was not suspended or sanctioned, since ephedrine is a substance found in many over the counter remedies, and Boldon had been treating a cold. "It is in no way something where the blame is laid on the athlete," said IAAF General Secretary István Gyulai of the positive result.

Also in 2001, at the World Championships in Edmonton, Alberta, Canada, Boldon finished fourth and out of the medals in the 100 m with 9.98 s, and then ran the second leg of his country's 4 × 100 metres relay, finishing third in the finals. This was Trinidad and Tobago's first 4 × 100 m relay medal in either World or Olympic competition and Boldon states that making national history with this team of young men (the average age of his teammates was 19) was his greatest accomplishment in his career. The colours of his 2001 World Championship medals would change in 2005 as both his placings were improved – he received bronze in the 100 m and the bronze relay medals were upgraded to silver after all the times and performances of the American sprinter Tim Montgomery (who was second in the 100 m and won the 4 × 100 m with the US team) were nullified due to serious doping violations. That brought Boldon's career total to four World Championship medals, to match his four Olympic medals.

Boldon was seriously injured in a head-on crash with a drunk driver in Barataria, Trinidad and Tobago, in July 2002, and never again ran sub-ten seconds in the 100 m or sub-twenty seconds for 200 m, something he had done on 37 separate occasions prior to 2002. In 2006, a judge in Trinidad found that Boldon was not at fault in that accident, and he was paid substantial damages as a result. That accident left Boldon with a serious hip injury, and he was a shadow of his former self as a sprinter. In 2004 at the Athens Olympic Games, he failed to advance out of the first round of the 100 m heats but captained his country's 4 × 100 m relay team to their first-ever Olympic final, where they finished seventh.

Boldon is the eighth person to win a medal for Trinidad and Tobago at the Olympics and currently has the third most wind-legal sub-10 second 100 m performances in history with 28, behind former training partner Maurice Greene, who has 52, and Jamaica's former 100 m World Record holder Asafa Powell, who leads with 97.

On 20 April 2008 The Observer published the contents of a letter believed to be by Boldon to John Smith, his former coach, accusing Smith, Maurice Greene of betraying him by obtaining banned drugs without his knowledge, lying about Greene competing without drugs and damaging his own career. But for a quote on the matter to HellenicAthletes.com, a website he wrote for at the time, Boldon has had no further official comment.

=== Broadcasting ===
At the 1999 World Championships in Seville, Spain, Boldon could not compete due to a serious injury. The British Broadcasting Corporation hired him to do commentary and analysis for their coverage of those Championships. He proved popular with the audience and was invited back as a track-side analyst for the BBC coverage of the U.S. Olympic Track and Field Trials in 2000, from Sacramento, California.

From 2005 to 2009, Boldon was in the broadcast booth for the US television network CBS as part of their commentary team for the NCAA Outdoor Track and Field Championships. In June 2007, he made his debut for NBC Sports as an analyst for the 2007 US National Championships, and he also was an integral part of Versus and NBC's coverage of 2007 Osaka World Championships. In 2008, he was the sprint analyst at the US Olympic Track and Field Trials and the 2008 Summer Olympics for NBC Sports. Boldon was widely praised for his NBC work by the press, including the Los Angeles Times, USA Today and The New York Times which called him "one of NBC's best analysts, a blend of athletic smarts, charisma, precise analysis and brashness." In 2010, Boldon joined the only U.S. track and field broadcast team he had not previously been a regular part of, ESPN, after the departure of their long-time analyst, Larry Rawson. In 2012, he continued his role as the NBC track and field analyst for the 2012 Summer Olympics. In 2013, for his 2012 London Olympic commentary, Boldon became the first and only track and field broadcaster in US history to be nominated for a Sports Emmy Award. He was nominated in the category of Outstanding Sports Personality, Sports Event Analyst. Cris Collinsworth, his friend and colleague from NBC Sports' Sunday Night Football, eventually won the Emmy, his fifth win in a row. Alongside Tom Feuer, Boldon has served as a game analyst for Track & Field events for the Pac-12 Network

In 2017, Boldon joined NASCAR on NBC's broadcast as a features contributor.

=== Politics ===
Boldon was sworn in on 14 February 2006 as a Senator representing the Opposition United National Congress following the resignation of former Senator Roy Augustus, who resigned on 13 February in a dispute over the leadership style of then Leader of the Opposition Basdeo Panday. Boldon resigned on 11 April 2007 after 14 months as a senator, saying he had a role in sports broadcasting, also citing issues with Panday's leadership ability.

=== Media ===
In 2006, Boldon wrote, produced and directed a 73-minute DVD film entitled Once in a Lifetime: Boldon in Bahrain which documented his voyage with fellow fans and Trinidad and Tobago nationals to the Kingdom of Bahrain, where the country's soccer team, the Soca Warriors, defeated Bahrain 1–0 in a playoff to become the smallest country ever to qualify for the FIFA World Cup, qualifying to play at the Germany 2006 tournament.

=== Coaching ===
Boldon began coaching Khalifa St. Fort around 2012 and helped her improve her 100 m from 12.3 to 11.5 seconds after one month. St. Fort won the silver medal at the 2015 World Youth Championships in Athletics and a bronze in the relay at the 2015 World Championships in Athletics.

== Personal life ==
In 2000, Boldon was made a sports ambassador by the Republic of Trinidad and Tobago and given a diplomatic passport. He is widely viewed as one of the all-time leading sportsmen in the history of the Caribbean, as well as one of its most internationally recognizable spokesmen. When Trinidad and Tobago hosted the 2001 FIFA U-17 World Championship in association football, one of the new stadiums constructed for the tournament was located in Couva and named Ato Boldon Stadium. Thus Boldon became only the second island sprinter at the time to have a stadium named after him after the 1976 Olympic champion Hasely Crawford (Hasely Crawford Stadium located in the capital Port of Spain).

Boldon is a qualified pilot, having earned his private pilot's license in August 2005. He is a member of the AOPA, Aircraft Owners and Pilot's Association.

== Achievements ==
On 4 November 2011, Boldon was inducted into the UCLA Athletics Hall of Fame.

=== Competition record ===
| Year | Competition | Venue | Position | Event | Notes |
Representing Trinidad and Tobago
| 1992 | Central American and Caribbean Junior Championships (U-20) | Tegucigalpa, Honduras | 1st | 100 m | 10.4 (0.0 m/s) |
| 1992 | Central American and Caribbean Junior Championships (U-20) | Tegucigalpa, Honduras | 1st | 200 m | 21.5 (0.1 m/s) |
| 1992 | World Junior Championships | Seoul, South Korea | 1st | 100 m | 10.30 (0.0 m/s) |
| 1992 | World Junior Championships | Seoul, South Korea | 1st | 200 m | 20.63 (0.3 m/s) |
| 1992 | Olympic Games | Barcelona, Spain | 45th (h) | 100 m | 10.77 (−0.3 m/s) |
| 1992 | Olympic Games | Barcelona, Spain | 47th (h) | 200 m | 21.65 (0.0 m/s) |
| 1993 | World Championships | Stuttgart, Germany | 25th (qf) | 100 m | 10.48 (−0.1 m/s) |
| 1993 | World Championships | Stuttgart, Germany | 41st (h) | 200 m | 21.31 (−1.2 m/s) |
| 1993 | World Championships | Stuttgart, Germany | 19th (h) | 4 × 100 m | 40.24 |
| 1994 | Commonwealth Games | Victoria, Canada | 4th | 100 m | 10.07 |
| 1994 | Commonwealth Games | Victoria, Canada | 9th (sf) | 200 m | 20.80 |
| 1995 | World Championships | Gothenburg, Sweden | 3rd | 100 m | 10.03 (1.0 m/s) |
| 1995 | World Championships | Gothenburg, Sweden | 29th (qf) | 200 m | 21.81 (−0.1 m/s) |
| 1996 | Olympic Games | Atlanta, United States | 3rd | 100 m | 9.90 (0.7 m/s) |
| 1996 | Olympic Games | Atlanta, United States | 3rd | 200 m | 19.80 (0.4 m/s) |
| 1997 | World Championships | Athens, Greece | 5th | 100 m | 10.02 (0.2 m/s) |
| 1997 | World Championships | Athens, Greece | 1st | 200 m | 20.04 w (2.3 m/s) |
| 1998 | Commonwealth Games | Kuala Lumpur, Malaysia | 1st | 100 m | 9.88 (−0.1 m/s) GR |
| 1998 | Goodwill Games | New York City, United States | 2nd | 100 m | 10.00 |
| 1998 | Goodwill Games | New York City, United States | 1st | 200 m | 20.15 |
| 2000 | Olympic Games | Sydney, Australia | 2nd | 100 m | 9.99 (−0.3 m/s) |
| 2000 | Olympic Games | Sydney, Australia | 3rd | 200 m | 20.20 (−0.6 m/s) |
| 2000 | Olympic Games | Sydney, Australia | 11th (sf) | 4 × 100 m | 38.92 NR |
| 2001 | World Championships | Edmonton, Canada | 3rd | 100 m | 9.98 (−0.2 m/s) |
| 2001 | World Championships | Edmonton, Canada | 2nd | 4 × 100 m | 38.58 NR |
| 2003 | World Championships | Paris, France | 8th (sf) | 100 m | 10.22 (0.6 m/s) |
| 2003 | World Championships | Paris, France | 10th (sf) | 4 × 100 m | 38.84 |
| 2003 | Pan American Games | Santo Domingo, Dominican Republic | 2nd | 4 × 100 m | 38.53 |
| 2004 | Olympic Games | Athens, Greece | 44th (h) | 100 m | 10.41 (−1.1 m/s) |
| 2004 | Olympic Games | Athens, Greece | 7th | 4 × 100 m | 38.60 |

=== Personal bests ===
| Date | Event | Venue | Time (seconds) |
|---|---|---|---|
| 16 February 2000 | 50 metres | Madrid, Spain | 5.64 (National record) |
| 23 February 1997 | 60 metres | Birmingham, United Kingdom | 6.49 (National record) |
| 19 April 1998, 17 June 1998, 16 June 1999, 2 July 1999 | 100 metres | Walnut, Athens, Athens & Lausanne | 9.86 +1.8, −0.4, +0.1 & +0.4 (National record) |
| 13 July 1997 | 200 metres | Stuttgart, Germany | 19.77 (National record) |

- All information taken from IAAF profile.

=== Track records ===
As of September 2024, Boldon holds the following track records for 100 metres and 200 metres.

==== 100 metres ====
| Location | Time | Windspeed m/s | Date |
|---|---|---|---|
| Kuala Lumpur | 9.88 | –0.1 | 17 September 1998 |
| Malmö | 10.03 | +4.2 | 7 August 2000 |

==== 200 metres ====
| Location | Time | Windspeed m/s | Date |
|---|---|---|---|
| Westwood | 20.00 | +1.0 | 19 May 1996 |

Sporting positions
| Preceded by Michael Johnson | Men's 200 m Best Year Performance; 1997–1998 | Succeeded by Francis Obikwelu |
| Preceded by Maurice Greene | Men's 100 m Best Year Performance; 1998–1999 | Succeeded by Maurice Greene |
Olympic Games
| Preceded by Gene Samuel | Flagbearer for Trinidad and Tobago; Sydney 2000; Athens 2004 | Succeeded by George Bovell |
Political offices
| Preceded by Roy Augustus | Senator of Trinidad and Tobago; 14 February 2006 – 11 April 2007 | Succeeded by |
