= Donovan Bailey =

Jamaican-Canadian sprinter (born 1967)

Donovan Bailey OC OOnt
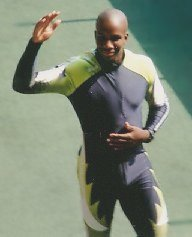
- Donovan Bailey in Cologne, 1997

Personal information
- Nationality: Jamaican-Canadian
- Born: Donovan Anthony Bailey; December 16, 1967 (age 58) Manchester Parish, Jamaica
- Height: 183 cm (6 ft 0 in)
- Weight: 82 kg (181 lb)

Sport
- Sport: Running
- Events: 50 metres, 60 metres, 100 metres, 150 metres, 200 metres
Medal record
Men's athletics
Representing Canada
Event	1st	2nd	3rd
Olympic Games	2	0	0
World Championships	3	1	0
Commonwealth Games	1	0	0
Goodwill Games	0	1	0
Pan American Games	0	2	0
Jeux de la Francophonie	1	1	0
Total	7	5	0
Olympic Games
Gold medal – first place	1996 Atlanta	100 m
Gold medal – first place	1996 Atlanta	4 × 100 m relay
World Championships
Gold medal – first place	1995 Gothenburg	100 m
Gold medal – first place	1995 Gothenburg	4 × 100 m relay
Gold medal – first place	1997 Athens	4 × 100 m relay
Silver medal – second place	1997 Athens	100 m
Commonwealth Games
Gold medal – first place	1994 Victoria	4 × 100 m relay
Goodwill Games
Silver medal – second place	1998 New York	4 × 100 m relay
Pan American Games
Silver medal – second place	1991 Havana	4 × 100 m relay
Silver medal – second place	1999 Winnipeg	4 × 100 m relay
Jeux de la Francophonie
Gold medal – first place	1994 Paris	4 × 100 m relay
Silver medal – second place	1994 Paris	100 m

Donovan Bailey (born December 16, 1967) is a Jamaican-Canadian retired sprinter. He once held the world record for the 100 metres. He recorded a time of 9.84 seconds to become Olympic champion in 1996. He was the first Canadian to legally break the 10-second barrier in the 100 m. Particularly noted for his top speed, Bailey ran 12.10 m/s (43.6 km/h; 27.1 mph) in his 1996 Olympic title run, the fastest ever recorded by a human at the time. He was inducted into Canada's Sports Hall of Fame in 2004 as an individual athlete and in 2008 as part of the 1996 Summer Olympics 4 × 100 relay team. In 2005, he was also inducted into the Ontario Sports Hall of Fame.

== Early life ==
Donovan Anthony Bailey was born in Manchester Parish, Jamaica, on December 16, 1967, as the fourth of five sons to George and Daisy Bailey. Before going to Mount Olivet Primary School, he would take care of his family's chickens, goats, and pigs. Donovan was fast when he was a young boy, with his former teacher Claris Lambert recounting that "He showed his athletic skills from grade one. He always came first in races."

Before going to Canada, Bailey competed for one year at ISSA Champs for Knox College in Manchester, Jamaica.

Bailey immigrated to Canada at age 12 and played basketball before graduating from Queen Elizabeth Park High School in Oakville, Ontario. During high school, his brother, O'Neil, won 4 Ontario Provincial titles in the long jump. Bailey was exceptionally fast as well, clocking 10.65 seconds in the 100 m at the age of 16. However, his main interest was in basketball. After graduating in June 1984, Bailey attended Sheridan College, for which he played basketball during the 1986–1987 school year. He graduated from Sheridan with a degree in business administration. Bailey then began working as a property and marketing consultant for an importing and exporting clothing company.

== Career ==
=== Early career ===
It was only in 1990 that Bailey decided to begin racing professionally; after watching the 1990 Canadian Track and Field Championships, he realized that most of the men competing were men he had beaten in high school. He began training as a 100 m sprinter part-time, while working as a stockbroker. In 1991, he won the 60 metres at the Ontario Indoor Championships, and at the 1991 Pan American Games in Havana, Cuba, Bailey anchored Canada's 4 × 100 metres relay team, to a silver medal. In 1992, Bailey finished second in the 100 m at the national championships.

From 1993 to 1994, he competed for Fenerbahçe Athletics. During this time, he claimed a bronze in the 100 m and a silver in the 200 m at the 1993 national championships, a silver in the 100 m and gold in the 4 × 100 metres at the 1994 Francophone Games in Paris, and a gold medal in the 4 × 100 m at the 1994 Commonwealth Games in Victoria, British Columbia. However, despite his impressive performances at a national level, he was only chosen as an alternate for the 4 × 100 m at the 1993 World Championships in Stuttgart. American coach Dan Pfaff, who coached Bailey's high school friend Glenroy Gilbert at Louisiana State University and listened to Bailey's complaints, was impressed by Bailey's performances considering his terrible form and fitness. Pfaff invited Bailey to train with him and Gilbert at LSU, and with just 3 months of training together, Bailey shaved 3 tenths of a second off of his 100 m personal best; his time of 10.03 seconds was the third fastest in Canadian history.

=== 1995: Breakthrough ===
On April 22, 1995, Bailey made history by breaking the 10-second barrier for the first time in the 100 m, becoming the 18th man and 2nd Canadian to legally do so. His time of 9.99 seconds was just 4 hundredths shy of Ben Johnson's record of 9.95. In July, he broke Johnson's record with 9.91 at the national championships, the fastest time of the year, effectively asserting his name as a favorite for the gold medal at the World Championships in Gothenburg later that year. Bailey went on to win the title in 9.97 seconds, then followed it up by anchoring Canada to their first world championship gold in the 4 × 100 m.

=== 1996: Olympic History ===
With a world title now under his belt, Bailey was highly considered to be a favorite for the Olympic title in Atlanta that July. As a precursor to the centennial Olympics, Bailey broke the indoor 50 m world record during a competition in Reno, Nevada in 1996. He was timed at 5.56 seconds. Maurice Greene later matched that performance in 1999, but his run was never ratified as a world record.

Bailey was officially selected to represent Canada at the 1996 Summer Olympics after winning his 3rd consecutive national title in the 100 m. On July 27, after a very disrupted start to the race, Bailey won the Olympic 100 m title setting a new world record of 9.84 seconds. During the race, he hit a top speed of 12.10 m/s (43.6 km/h or 27.1 mph), which was the fastest top speed ever recorded by a human being at the time. Many Canadians felt Bailey's victory restored the image of Canadian athletes, after the exposure of Ben Johnson's history of doping. At the time, Bailey was only the second person after Carl Lewis to hold all the major titles in the 100 m concurrently (World Champion, Olympic Champion & World Record Holder). 6 days later, he completed the 100 m/4 × 100 m double once again, anchoring Canada to their first ever Olympic 4 × 100 m title in a national record of 37.69 seconds.

=== Rivalry with Michael Johnson ===
After the end of the 1996 Summer Olympics, American Sportscaster Bob Costas claimed that 200 m gold medalist Michael Johnson was faster than Bailey because Johnson's 200 m time (19.32 Secs.) split time of ( first 100m 10.12s and second 100m of 9.20s) was shorter than Bailey's 100 m time (9.84). This started a debate on whether Johnson or Bailey was the real "World's Fastest Man", which in turn resulted in a 150m race between the two, in which Bailey won after Johnson allegedly injured his hamstring.

=== 1997 World Championships ===
At the 1997 World Championships in Athens, Bailey attempted to defend his 100 m title, but was beaten by Maurice Greene and was forced to settle for the silver medal in 9.91 seconds. However, along with his Canadian teammates, he was able to defend Canada's 4 × 100 m title in 37.86 seconds, the fastest time of the year. One of his last meets of the season was at the ISTAF Berlin; after finishing 2nd in the 100 m, Bailey ran the first leg of the "Dream Team II" in the 4 × 100 m relay: Carl Lewis' last race of his career. With Leroy Burrell on the 2nd leg, Frankie Fredericks on the 3rd, and Lewis on the anchor, the team won in 38.24 seconds, a meeting record.

=== 1998 Goodwill Games ===
Bailey and the 4 × 100 metre Canadian relay team won a silver medal with a time of 38.23 at the 1998 Goodwill Games in New York, finishing behind the United States. Bailey ruptured his Achilles tendon while playing basketball during the post season of 1998, which effectively began the end of his athletics career.

=== 1999 Pan American Games and World Championships ===
Bailey won a silver medal with the Canadian 4 × 100 metre relay team with a time of 38.49 at the 1999 Pan American Games in Winnipeg, finishing behind Brazil. The silver medal matched his first international medal he won eight years earlier at the 1991 Pan American Games in the 4 × 100 metre relay and it would be his final international medal. Bailey was part of the Canadian 4 × 100 metre relay team at the 1999 World Championships in Seville but the team was disqualified in the first round of heats.

=== 2000 Summer Olympics and 2001 World Championships ===
He made a second attempt in the 2000 Summer Olympics, but suffered from pneumonia and dropped out during the rounds. He retired from the sport in 2001 after the World Championships in Edmonton, having been a three-time World and 2 time Olympic champion.

== Post-retirement ==
After racing, Bailey started his own company called DBX Sport Management which helps amateur athletes find a way to promote themselves. He also started a sport injury clinic in Oakville, Ontario.

He has been inducted into Canada's Sports Hall of Fame twice: in 2004 as an individual, and in 2008 as part of the 1996 Summer Olympics 4 × 100 relay team.

In August 2008 Bailey began work as a track commentator for CBC Television at the 2008 Summer Olympics. He estimated that had Usain Bolt not slowed down near the end of the 100 m dash (which he still won in record time), he could have set a time of 9.55 seconds. He returned as the track analyst for CBC's coverage of the 2016 Summer Olympics.

In 2010, Bailey was one of the recipients of the Top 25 Canadian Immigrant Awards presented by Canadian Immigrant Magazine.

In 2014, Bailey pleaded guilty to a drinking and driving charge from 2012. This was the third driving-related incident for Bailey. In 1998 he crashed his car into a concrete utility pole and was fined $200 for failing to report an accident. In 2001, Bailey was fined $975 for driving 200 km/h on a 100 km/h road in Toronto.

In 2016, he was made a member of the Order of Ontario. In 2017, Canada's Walk of Fame honoured him with a star.

In 2018, it was reported that Bailey had provided his entire athlete's trust of $3.75 million to Aird & Berlis lawyer Stuart Bollefer, who invested it in what was determined to be a tax evasion scheme by the Canadian government. Bailey lost the full amount due to the scheme, however the courts ordered Aird & Berlis to pay all outstanding taxes due to their negligence.

In 2022, Bailey was named an officer to the Order of Canada.

== Personal bests ==
Event	Time (seconds)	Venue	Date
50 metres	5.56	Reno, Nevada, United States	February 9, 1996
60 metres	6.51	Maebashi, Gunma, Japan	February 8, 1997
100 metres	9.84 (1996–1999) (1996–2008)	Atlanta, Georgia, United States	July 27, 1996
150 meters	14.99	Toronto, Ontario, Canada	June 1, 1997
200 metres	20.14	Bislett Games, Oslo, Norway	July 4, 1997

=== Track records ===
As of 9 September 2024, Bailey holds the following track records for 100 metres.

Location	Time	Windspeed m/s	Date
Abbotsford, BC	9.97	+2.2	02/06/1996
Atlanta, GA	9.84; PB	+0.7	27/07/1996
Burnaby, BC	9.99	0.0	18/05/1997
Cologne	9.99	–0.7	24/08/1997
Duisburg	9.88	+4.0	12/06/1996
Gothenburg	9.97	+1.0	06/08/1995
Ottawa	10.05	+1.8	30/06/1994

== See also ==
- Canadian records in track and field
- World record progression 100 metres men
