= Bruny Surin =

Canadian track and field athlete

Bruny Surin CM CQ
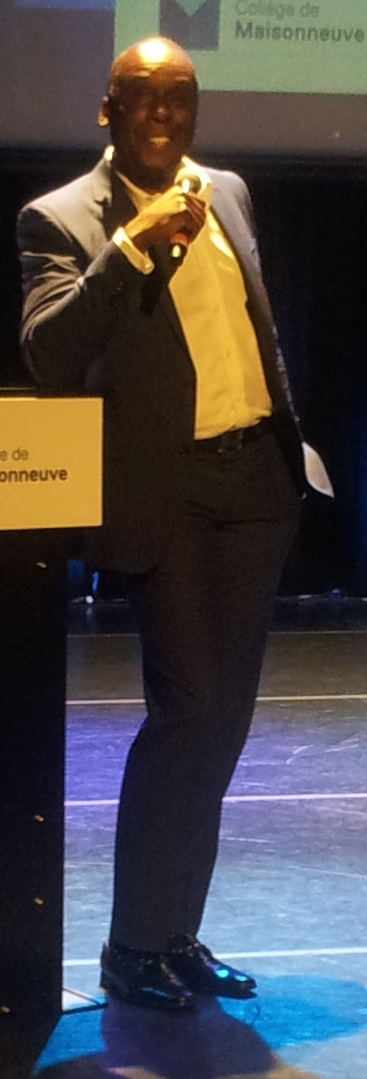
- Bruny Surin at the Maisonneuve College

Personal information
- Nationality: Canadian
- Born: July 12, 1967 (age 59) Cap-Haitien, Haiti
- Home town: Montreal, Quebec, Canada
- Height: 1.80 m (5 ft 11 in)
- Weight: 81 kg (179 lb)

Sport
- Sport: Track and field
- Event: 100 metres

Achievements and titles
- Personal bests: 100 m : 9.84 (Sevilla 1999); 200 m : 20.21 (Brussels 1999)
Medal record
Men's athletics
Representing Canada
Event	1st	2nd	3rd
Olympic Games	1	0	0
World Championships	2	2	1
World Indoor Championships	2	0	0
Commonwealth Games	1	0	1
Goodwill Games	0	1	0
Jeux de la Francophonie	1	0	0
Total	7	3	2
Olympic Games
Gold medal – first place	1996 Atlanta	4 × 100 m relay
World Championships
Gold medal – first place	1995 Gothenburg	4 × 100 m relay
Gold medal – first place	1997 Athens	4 × 100 m relay
Silver medal – second place	1995 Gothenburg	100 m
Silver medal – second place	1999 Seville	100 m
Bronze medal – third place	1993 Stuttgart	4 × 100 m relay
IAAF World Indoor Championships
Gold medal – first place	1993 Toronto	60 m
Gold medal – first place	1995 Barcelona	60 m
Commonwealth Games
Gold medal – first place	1994 Victoria	4 × 100 m relay
Bronze medal – third place	1990 Auckland	100 m
Goodwill Games
Silver medal – second place	1998 New York	4 × 100 m relay
Jeux de la Francophonie
Gold medal – first place	1994 Paris	100 m

Bruny Surin CM CQ (born July 12, 1967) is a Canadian former track and field athlete, who was the winner of a gold medal in the 4 × 100 metres relay at the 1996 Summer Olympics. In 2008 he was inducted into Canada's Sports Hall of Fame as part of the 1996 Summer Olympics 4 × 100 relay team. In the 100 metres, he has broken the 10-second barrier multiple times and holds a personal record of 9.84 seconds.

== Career ==
Surin was born in Cap-Haïtien, Haïti, and moved to Québec City with his family in 1975. He made his debut for Canada at the 1987 Pan-American Games, placing fifteenth in the long jump, a result he repeated at the 1988 Olympics.

After the Olympic Games in Seoul in 1988, manager Enrico Dionisi brought Surin to Siena and he was trained by the Italian coach Franco Barucci. Barucci persuaded Surin away from his favoured long jump event, in favour of the 100 m. Barucci predicted he could run 10.10 seconds for the event. Surin won the following Canadian championships in 10.14 seconds.

At the 1990 Commonwealth Games, Surin won a bronze medal in 100 m and was seventh in the long jump. At the 1991 World Championships, Surin was eighth in the 100 m, and at the 1992 Summer Olympics he was 4th in the 100 m and reached the semifinals as a member of Canadian 4 × 100 m relay team.

At the 1993 World Championships, Surin was fifth in 100 m and won a bronze medal as a member of Canadian 4 × 100 m relay team. At the 1994 Commonwealth Games, Surin won the gold medal in 4 × 100 m relay and was eliminated in the semifinal of 100 m. Competing for the province of Quebec, Surin edged out Donovan Bailey to win gold in the 100 m at the 1994 Francophone Games in Paris with a games record time of 10.08 seconds. At the 1995 World Championships, Surin won a silver medal in 100 m, behind compatriot Bailey, and a gold medal as a member of Canadian 4 × 100 m relay team.

At the Atlanta Olympics, the Canadian relay team were not favoured, although they had won almost all of the titles available during the previous two years, but they had done it in absence of the United States team. However, in the 4 × 100 m relay final, the Canadian team beat United States by almost half a second, establishing itself the best relay team in the world. Surin also reached the semifinal of 100 m in the same competition.

Surin and the Canadian team won a gold medal again at the 1997 World Championships and a silver medal at the 1998 Goodwill Games. He was also seventh in 100 m at the 1997 World Championships and won a silver medal in 100 m at the 1999 World Championships. His time matched Donovan Bailey's Canadian record of 9.84. At the time, this was the fastest losing time in a 100 m race.

At the 2000 Summer Olympics, Surin, one of the gold medal favourites, had not fully recovered from a leg injury sustained at the Canadian championships earlier that summer, and was eliminated in the semifinals of the 100 m after slowing down visibly in pain and walking the rest of the way through the finish line. His last major championship race was in the semifinals of the 100 m at the 2001 World Championships, where he injured himself again and was pushed off the track in a wheelchair.

In 2009, Surin became the new Canadian 50 metres record holder (40-45 age group) with a time of 6.15s at the McGill Open.

In May 2022, Surin was named Team Canada's chef de mission for the 2024 Olympics in Paris.

=== Track records ===
As of 9 September 2024, Surin holds the following track records for 100 metres.

Location	Time	Windspeed m/s	Date
Bondoufle	10.08	+0.5	11/07/1994
Montreal	9.89	+1.5	01/08/1998
Nuremberg	9.92	+1.1	13/06/1999
Sherbrooke	10.07	+2.2	19/06/1998
Winnipeg	9.88	+3.1	26/06/1999

== Honours ==
In 2016, he was made a Knight of the National Order of Quebec.

== Book: Bruny Surin, le lion tranquille ==
Bruny Surin, le lion tranquille
- Author: Bruni Surin and Said Khalil
- Language: French
- Genre: Biography
- Publisher: Éditions Libre Expression
- Publication date: 2009
- Media type: Hardcover
- ISBN: 2-7648-0431-8

In 2009, a biography cowritten by Bruny Surin and Saïd Khalil entitled Bruny Surin, le lion tranquille was published by Éditions Libre Expression in Montreal. The book covers Bruny Surin recounting 17 years of his sports career. In the book, Surin criticizes doping, describing it as a gangrene that ails athletics and all other sports.

Surin emigrated to Canada with his family in 1975. His father lost his family in the 2010 Haiti earthquake. He has two daughters. Surin ran for a seat on Laval City Council in a by-election on November 24, 2019, but lost by 82 votes.

== See also ==
- List of Canadian records in athletics
