= Dennis Mitchell =

American track and field athlete and coach

Personal information
- Full name: Dennis Allen Mitchell
- National team: United States
- Born: February 20, 1966 (age 60) Havelock, North Carolina, U.S.
- Height: 5 ft 9 in (1.75 m)
- Weight: 154 lb (70 kg)

Sport
- Sport: Track and field
- Event: 100 meters
- College team: University of Florida

Achievements and titles
- Personal bests: 100 m : 9.91; 200 m : 20.09
Medal record
Men's track and field
Representing the United States
Olympic Games
| Gold medal – first place | 1992 Barcelona | 4 × 100 m relay |
| Silver medal – second place | 1996 Atlanta | 4 × 100 m relay |
| Bronze medal – third place | 1992 Barcelona | 100 m |
World Championships
| Gold medal – first place | 1991 Tokyo | 4 × 100 m relay |
| Gold medal – first place | 1993 Stuttgart | 4 × 100 m relay |
| Bronze medal – third place | 1991 Tokyo | 100 m |
| Bronze medal – third place | 1993 Stuttgart | 100 m |

Dennis Allen Mitchell (born February 20, 1966) is an American former college and international track and field athlete, who was a member of the gold medal-winning team in the 4 × 100 metres relay race at the 1992 Summer Olympics.

== Athletics career ==
Mitchell was born in Havelock, North Carolina. Raised in Winslow Township, New Jersey, he graduated in 1984 from Edgewood Regional High School.

He received an athletic scholarship to attend the University of Florida in Gainesville, Florida, where he ran for the Florida Gators track and field team in National Collegiate Athletic Association (NCAA) and Southeastern Conference (SEC) competition from 1986 to 1989. At Florida, Mitchell was coached by Joe Walker. Mitchell placed fourth in the 100 meters race at the 1988 Summer Olympics and missed a probable gold medal in the 4 × 100 meters relay race, because the American team was disqualified in the early heats, after the baton pass between teammates Calvin Smith and Lee McNeill was completed outside the exchange zone. In 1989, Mitchell won the NCAA championships in 200 meters race, and he was inducted into the University of Florida Athletic Hall of Fame as a "Gator Great" in 2005.

In 1991, just a month before the World Championships, Mitchell set his first world record in the 4 × 100 meters relay of 37.67 at Zürich. At the World Championships, Mitchell was again a member of the American 4 × 100 meters relay team, in which he set a new world record of 37.50 in the final. Mitchell also won a bronze medal in the individual 100 meters race, just 0.01 seconds shy of the world record.

In 1992, Mitchell won his first United States National Championships title in the 100 meters (he repeated this victory in 1994 and 1996). At the Barcelona Olympics, Mitchell ran his third world record in 4 × 100 meters relay of 37.40 and won again a bronze medal in the 100 meters race.

At the 1993 World Championships, Mitchell won his third bronze at the international championships in individual 100 meters and his third gold in relay event with a world record, as this time the American team equaled their own world record of 37.40.

Mitchell won a gold medal in 100 meters at the 1994 Goodwill Games, but injured himself in the heats of 100 -meters at the 1995 World Championships. At the 1996 Summer Olympics, Mitchell was fourth in 100-meters and won a silver medal as a member of the second-place U.S. 4 × 100-meters relay team.

His personal best for the 100 metres was 9.91 seconds, set in Tokyo on 25 August 1991 in the World Athletics Championships final.

== Personal life ==
Mitchell is married to Damu Cherry-Mitchell, an Olympian in the 100-meter hurdles, and has four children. He coaches his own club, Star Athletics, in Montverde, Florida. He has trained world class athletes including Sha'Carri Richardson, Kenny Bednarek, Justin Gatlin, Aaron Brown, Melissa Jefferson-Wooden, Javianne Oliver, and Twanisha Terry, among others.

One of his children, Malachi, plays for the Indianapolis Clowns in the Banana Ball Championship League under the pseudonym “Flash Tha Kid” . Prior to playing for the Clowns, Malachi played for the Savannah Bananas. He is an entertainment player and plays the game as a Designated Runner.

== Doping history ==
In 1998, Mitchell was banned by International Association of Athletics Federations for two years after a test showed high levels of testosterone. They did not accept his defense of "five bottles of beer and sex with his wife at least four times... it was her birthday, the lady deserved a treat." Mitchell made his final international appearance at the 2001 World Championships, where his team finished first in the 4 × 100 meters relay, but was subsequently disqualified because of BALCO scandal involvement by a teammate.

On May 1, 2008, it was announced that the U.S. government, in its trial against Trevor Graham, would have Mitchell, as well as Antonio Pettigrew as witnesses, with Mitchell to testify that Graham injected him with human growth hormone.

== See also ==
- Florida Gators
- List of Olympic medalists in athletics (men)
- List of University of Florida Olympians
- List of University of Florida Athletic Hall of Fame members

Awards
| Preceded by Michael Johnson | Men's Track & Field ESPY Award; 1995 | Succeeded by Michael Johnson |
