= Aleksandr Porkhomovskiy =

Russian-born Israeli sprinter (born 1972)

Personal information
- Native name: אלכסנדר פורחומובסקי
- Nationality: Israel
- Born: August 12, 1972 (age 54) Moscow, Soviet Union

Sport
- Sport: Athletics
- Event: Sprints

Achievements and titles
- Personal bests: 100 meters: 10.12 seconds (1994); 200 meters: 20.35 seconds (1994); 60 meters (indoor): 6.59 seconds (1994)
Medal record
Men's athletics
Representing Russia
European Championships
Bronze medal – third place	1994 Helsinki	100 m
Summer Universiade
Silver medal – second place	1997 Catania	100 m

Aleksandr Porkhomovskiy (Russian: Александр Порхомовский, Hebrew: אלכסנדר פורחומובסקי; born 12 August 1972) is a Russian-born Israeli retired sprinter.

His personal best in the 100 meters is 10.12, set in Russia on July 14, 1994. He competed five times at World Athletics Championships in 1993 (semi finalist), 1995 (quarter finalist), 1997 (quarter finalist), 1999 (quarter finalist) and 2001 (quarter finalist).

He is the Israeli national record holder at 100 meters and 60 meters and was former Russian record holder at 100 meters U23. In 1999 he became an Israeli athlete. He retired in 2003.

== Personal Best ==
Outdoor

- 100 meters - 10.12 s (1994)
- 200 meters - 20.35 s (1994)

Indoor

- 60 meters - 6.59 s (1994)

== See also ==
- List of 100 metres national champions (men)
