= Oleh Kramarenko (sprinter) =

Ukrainian sprinter

Medal record

Men's athletics

Representing Ukraine

European Championships
Silver medal – second place	1994 Helsinki	4×100 m

Oleh Kramarenko (Ukrainian: Олег Крамаренко; born 17 September 1970) is a Ukrainian sprinter who specialized in the 100 metres.

At the 1994 European Championships in Helsinki he finished fourth in the 100 m race and won a silver medal in 4 x 100 metres relay.
