= 1995 World Championships in Athletics – Men's 200 metres =

Men's 200 metres at the 1995 World Championships
- Venue: Ullevi Stadium
- Dates: 10 August (heats and quarter-finals); 11 August (semi-finals and final)
- Competitors: 63
- Winning time: 19.79 CR

Medalists
| gold medal | Michael Johnson | United States |
| silver medal | Frankie Fredericks | Namibia |
| bronze medal | Jeff Williams | United States |

Official Video

These are the official results of the Men's 200 metres event at the 1995 IAAF World Championships in Gothenburg, Sweden. There were a total number of 72 participating athletes, with two semi-finals, four quarter-finals and nine qualifying heats and the final held on Friday 11th August 1995. The winning margin was 0.33 seconds.

== Final ==
| RANK | FINAL Wind: +0.5 | TIME |
|---|---|---|
| | Michael Johnson (USA) | 19.79 |
| | Frankie Fredericks (NAM) | 20.12 |
| | Jeff Williams (USA) | 20.18 |
| 4. | Robson da Silva (BRA) | 20.21 |
| 5. | Claudinei da Silva (BRA) | 20.40 |
| 6. | Geir Moen (NOR) | 20.51 |
| 7. | John Regis (GBR) | 20.67 |
| 8. | Iván García (CUB) | 20.77 |

== Semi-finals ==
- Held on Friday 1995-08-11

| RANK | HEAT 1 Wind: +0.3 | TIME |
|---|---|---|
| 1. | Michael Johnson (USA) | 20.01 |
| 2. | Robson da Silva (BRA) | 20.20 |
| 3. | Geir Moen (NOR) | 20.32 |
| 4. | John Regis (GBR) | 20.39 |
| 5. | Damien Marsh (AUS) | 20.39 |
| 6. | Jean-Charles Trouabal (FRA) | 20.58 |
| 7. | Alexandros Alexopoulos (GRE) | 20.78 |
| 8. | Patrick Stevens (BEL) | 20.79 |

| RANK | HEAT 2 Wind: -0.9 | TIME |
|---|---|---|
| 1. | Frankie Fredericks (NAM) | 20.28 |
| 2. | Jeff Williams (USA) | 20.32 |
| 3. | Claudinei da Silva (BRA) | 20.37 |
| 4. | Iván García (CUB) | 20.45 |
| 5. | Solomon Wariso (GBR) | 20.58 |
| 6. | Steve Brimacombe (AUS) | 20.59 |
| 7. | Obadele Thompson (BAR) | 20.66 |
| 8. | Andrew Tynes (BAH) | 20.72 |

== Quarterfinals ==
- Held on Thursday 1995-08-10

| RANK | HEAT 1 Wind: +0.1 | TIME |
|---|---|---|
| 1. | Michael Johnson (USA) | 20.35 |
| 2. | Patrick Stevens (BEL) | 20.41 |
| 3. | Andrew Tynes (BAH) | 20.49 |
| 4. | Alexandros Alexopoulos (GRE) | 20.57 |
| 5. | David Dollé (SUI) | 20.84 |
| 6. | Lars Hedner (SWE) | 20.87 |
| 7. | Charles Gitonga (KEN) | 20.90 |
| 8. | Mark Keddell (NZL) | 40.08 |

| RANK | HEAT 2 Wind: +0.4 | TIME |
|---|---|---|
| 1. | Jeff Williams (USA) | 20.36 |
| 2. | Iván García (CUB) | 20.52 |
| 3. | Obadele Thompson (BAR) | 20.57 |
| 4. | Jean-Charles Trouabal (FRA) | 20.60 |
| 5. | Robert Kurnicki (GER) | 20.67 |
| 6. | Kevin Widmer (SUI) | 20.74 |
| 7. | Serhiy Osovych (UKR) | 21.00 |
| — | Thomas Sbokos (GRE) | DQ |

| RANK | HEAT 3 Wind: +0.8 | TIME |
|---|---|---|
| 1. | Frankie Fredericks (NAM) | 20.26 |
| 2. | Claudinei da Silva (BRA) | 20.35 |
| 3. | John Regis (GBR) | 20.51 |
| 4. | Steve Brimacombe (AUS) | 20.52 |
| 5. | Sergejs Insakovs (LAT) | 20.73 |
| 6. | Koji Ito (JPN) | 20.80 |
| 7. | Chris Donaldson (NZL) | 20.82 |
| 8. | Neil de Silva (TRI) | 21.01 |

| RANK | HEAT 4 Wind: -0.1 | TIME |
|---|---|---|
| 1. | Robson da Silva (BRA) | 20.33 |
| 2. | Geir Moen (NOR) | 20.37 |
| 3. | Damien Marsh (AUS) | 20.49 |
| 4. | Solomon Wariso (GBR) | 20.55 |
| 5. | Kevin Little (USA) | 20.60 |
| 6. | Emmanuel Tuffour (GHA) | 20.61 |
| 7. | Ato Boldon (TRI) | 21.81 |
| — | Raymond Stewart (JAM) | DNS |

== Qualifying heats ==
- Held on Thursday 1995-08-10

| RANK | HEAT 1 Wind: +0.9 | TIME |
|---|---|---|
| 1. | Patrick Stevens (BEL) | 20.54 |
| 2. | Andrew Tynes (BAH) | 20.56 |
| 3. | Alexandros Alexopoulos (GRE) | 20.59 |
| 4. | Kevin Widmer (SUI) | 20.69 |
| 5. | Alexander Lack (GER) | 20.97 |
| 6. | Benjamin Sirimou (CMR) | 21.42 |
| 7. | Tawanda Chiwira (ZIM) | 21.51 |
| — | Li Xiaoping (CHN) | DQ |

| RANK | HEAT 2 Wind: +0.2 | TIME |
|---|---|---|
| 1. | Michael Johnson (USA) | 20.57 |
| 2. | Jean-Charles Trouabal (FRA) | 20.66 |
| 3. | Charles Gitonga (KEN) | 20.72 |
| 4. | Darren Braithwaite (GBR) | 20.87 |
| 5. | Erik Wijmeersch (BEL) | 21.01 |
| 6. | Torbjörn Eriksson (SWE) | 21.03 |
| 7. | Christopher Sayeh (LBR) | 23.84 |
| — | Troy Douglas (BER) | DQ |

| RANK | HEAT 3 Wind: -0.3 | TIME |
|---|---|---|
| 1. | Obadele Thompson (BAR) | 20.63 |
| 2. | Emmanuel Tuffour (GHA) | 20.75 |
| 3. | Ato Boldon (TRI) | 20.76 |
| 4. | Sergejs Inšakovs (LAT) | 20.78 |
| 5. | Dean Capobianco (AUS) | 20.88 |
| 6. | Marcelo da Silva (BRA) | 21.02 |
| 7. | Jordi Mayoral (ESP) | 21.11 |
| 8. | Tony Ichiou (MNP) | 24.28 |

| RANK | HEAT 4 Wind: +1.1 | TIME |
|---|---|---|
| 1. | Jeff Williams (USA) | 20.56 |
| 2. | David Dollé (SUI) | 20.69 |
| 3. | Thomas Sbokos (GRE) | 20.71 |
| 4. | Mark Keddell (NZL) | 20.81 |
| 5. | Robert Maćkowiak (POL) | 20.83 |
| 6. | Peter Ogilvie (CAN) | 21.18 |
| 7. | Eswort Coombs (VIN) | 21.27 |
| 8. | Martin Frick (LIE) | 21.89 |

| RANK | HEAT 5 Wind: +0.8 | TIME |
|---|---|---|
| 1. | Steve Brimacombe (AUS) | 20.74 |
| 2. | Geir Moen (NOR) | 20.80 |
| 3. | Koji Ito (JPN) | 20.80 |
| 4. | Riaan Dempers (RSA) | 20.97 |
| 5. | Aleksandr Sokolov (RUS) | 21.17 |
| 6. | Alain Reimann (SUI) | 21.28 |
| 7. | Ricardo Roach (CHI) | 21.65 |
| 8. | Trevor Davis (AIA) | 22.03 |

| RANK | HEAT 6 Wind: +1.0 | TIME |
|---|---|---|
| 1. | Damien Marsh (AUS) | 20.65 |
| 2. | John Regis (GBR) | 20.78 |
| 3. | Lars Hedner (SWE) | 20.85 |
| 4. | Joseph Loua (GUI) | 21.06 |
| 5. | Huang Danwei (CHN) | 21.16 |
| 6. | Justice Dipeba (BOT) | 21.17 |
| — | Deji Aliu (NGR) | DNS |
| — | Georgios Panagiotopoulos (GRE) | DQ |

| RANK | HEAT 7 Wind: +2.0 | TIME |
|---|---|---|
| 1. | Claudinei da Silva (BRA) | 20.44 |
| 2. | Solomon Wariso (GBR) | 20.51 |
| 3. | Iván García (CUB) | 20.70 |
| 4. | Serhiy Osovych (UKR) | 20.70 |
| 5. | Francisco Javier Navarro (ESP) | 20.88 |
| 6. | Menelik Lawson (TOG) | 21.06 |
| 7. | Jun Osakada (JPN) | 21.25 |
| 8. | Brahim Abdoulaye (CHA) | 21.86 |

| RANK | HEAT 8 Wind: +0.5 | TIME |
|---|---|---|
| 1. | Robson da Silva (BRA) | 20.53 |
| 2. | Robert Kurnicki (GER) | 20.61 |
| 3. | Raymond Stewart (JAM) | 20.83 |
| 4. | Carlos Gats (ARG) | 21.02 |
| 5. | Daniel Cojocaru (ROM) | 21.09 |
| 6. | Kurvin Wallace (SKN) | 21.29 |
| 7. | Antoine Boussombo (GAB) | 21.32 |
| — | Olapade Adeniken (NGR) | DNS |

| RANK | HEAT 9 Wind: +0.6 | TIME |
|---|---|---|
| 1. | Frankie Fredericks (NAM) | 20.73 |
| 2. | Chris Donaldson (NZL) | 20.75 |
| 3. | Neil de Silva (TRI) | 20.77 |
| 4. | Kevin Little (USA) | 20.80 |
| 5. | Marc Blume (GER) | 20.86 |
| 6. | Miguel Janssen (ARU) | 21.31 |
| 7. | Keith Smith (ISV) | 21.64 |
| — | Vladyslav Dolohodin (UKR) | DNF |
