= 1999 IAAF World Indoor Championships – Men's 200 metres =

The men's 200 metres event at the 1999 IAAF World Indoor Championships was held on March 5–6.

== Medalists ==
Gold	Silver	Bronze
Frankie Fredericks; Namibia	Obadele Thompson; Barbados	Kevin Little; United States

== Results ==
=== Heats ===
First 2 of each heat (Q) and next 5 fastest (q) qualified for the semifinals.

Rank	Heat	Name	Nationality	Time	Notes
1	7	Koji Ito	Japan	20.73	Q, AR
2	1	Kevin Little	United States	20.83	Q
2	6	Rohsaan Griffin	United States	20.83	Q
4	2	Obadele Thompson	Barbados	20.84	Q, SB
4	4	Frankie Fredericks	Namibia	20.84	Q
6	3	Francis Obikwelu	Nigeria	20.87	Q
6	5	Alexios Alexopoulos	Greece	20.87	Q, SB
8	7	Iván García	Cuba	20.89	Q
9	2	Patrick van Balkom	Netherlands	20.94	Q, NR
10	6	Marcus Adam	Great Britain	20.98	Q
11	5	Chris Donaldson	New Zealand	21.01	Q, NR
11	6	Marcin Urbaś	Poland	21.01	q, PB
13	3	Juan Pedro Toledo	Mexico	21.02	Q, NR
13	5	Anninos Markoullides	Cyprus	21.02	q
13	7	Christophe Cheval	France	21.02	q
16	1	Darryl Wohlsen	Australia	21.06	Q
17	4	Carlos Gats	Argentina	21.08	Q, NR
18	3	Ryszard Pilarczyk	Poland	21.10	q
18	4	Petko Yankov	Bulgaria	21.10	
20	2	John Regis	Great Britain	21.23	
21	7	Malik Louahla	Algeria	21.24	NR
22	5	Marc Foucan	France	21.28	
23	6	O'Brian Gibbons	Canada	21.31	
24	2	Boštjan Horvat	Slovenia	21.35	
24	5	Kazuhiro Takahashi	Japan	21.35	
26	1	Erik Wijmeersch	Belgium	21.74	
27	4	Chen Tien-Wen	Chinese Taipei	21.82	
28	3	Hamoud Abdallah Al-Dalhami	Oman	21.99	
29	4	Menzi Dlamini	Swaziland	22.57	
30	6	Silas Helo	Solomon Islands	23.13	
31	7	Kwame Galloway	Montserrat	24.32	
	1	Prodromos Katsantonis	Cyprus	DNS	

=== Semifinals ===
First 2 of each semifinal qualified directly (Q) for the final.

Rank	Heat	Name	Nationality	Time	Notes
1	3	Frankie Fredericks	Namibia	20.18	Q, CR
2	3	Kevin Little	United States	20.32	Q, AR
3	1	Obadele Thompson	Barbados	20.55	Q, SB
3	2	Francis Obikwelu	Nigeria	20.55	Q
5	2	Koji Ito	Japan	20.63	Q, AR
6	1	Rohsaan Griffin	United States	20.81	Q
7	2	Alexios Alexopoulos	Greece	20.98	
8	1	Marcin Urbaś	Poland	21.01	=PB
9	3	Chris Donaldson	New Zealand	21.02	
10	2	Juan Pedro Toledo	Mexico	21.13	
11	1	Patrick van Balkom	Netherlands	21.15	
12	3	Iván García	Cuba	21.24	
13	1	Marcus Adam	Great Britain	21.37	
13	3	Christophe Cheval	France	21.37	
15	3	Carlos Gats	Argentina	21.50	
16	2	Darryl Wohlsen	Australia	21.57	
17	1	Anninos Markoullides	Cyprus	22.30	
	2	Ryszard Pilarczyk	Poland	DNS	

=== Final ===
Rank	Lane	Name	Nationality	Time	Notes
1st place, gold medalist(s)	6	Frankie Fredericks	Namibia	20.10	CR
2nd place, silver medalist(s)	5	Obadele Thompson	Barbados	20.26	AR
3rd place, bronze medalist(s)	4	Kevin Little	United States	20.48	
4	3	Francis Obikwelu	Nigeria	20.85	
5	2	Koji Ito	Japan	20.95	
6	1	Rohsaan Griffin	United States	22.06	
