= Athletics at the 1996 Summer Olympics – Men's 200 metres =

Men's 200 metres at the Games of the XXVI Olympiad
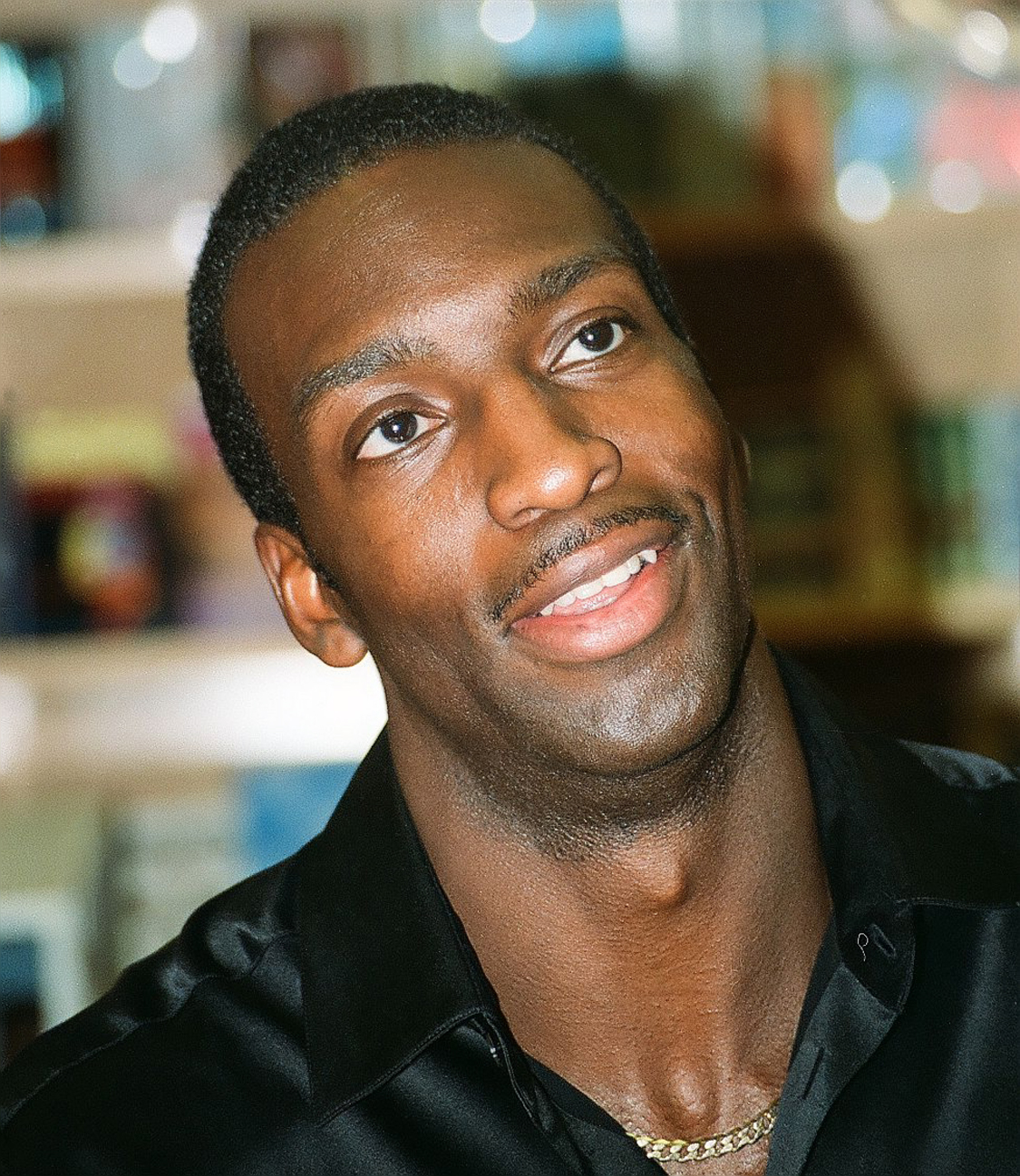
- Michael Johnson (1995)
- Venue: Centennial Olympic Stadium
- Dates: July 31 – August 1
- Competitors: 78 from 57 nations
- Winning time: 19.32 WR

Medalists
1st place, gold medalist(s)		Michael Johnson; United States
2nd place, silver medalist(s)		Frank Fredericks; Namibia
3rd place, bronze medalist(s)		Ato Boldon; Trinidad and Tobago

Official Video Highlights

The men's 200 metres was an event at the 1996 Summer Olympics in Atlanta, Georgia. There were 78 participating athletes from 57 nations, with eleven qualifying heats (78), five quarterfinal races (40), two semifinals (16) and a final (8). The maximum number of athletes per nation had been set at 3 since the 1930 Olympic Congress. The event was won by Michael Johnson of the United States, the nation's fourth consecutive and 16th overall victory in the event. Frankie Fredericks of Namibia won his second straight silver medal, the eighth man to win multiple medals in the 200 metres. Ato Boldon earned Trinidad and Tobago's first medal in the event with his bronze.

== Background ==
This was the 22nd appearance of the event, which was not held at the first Olympics in 1896 but has been on the program ever since. Four of the eight finalists from the 1992 Games returned: gold medalist Michael Marsh of the United States, silver medalist Frankie Fredericks of Namibia, fourth-place finisher (and 1988 bronze medalist) Robson da Silva of Brazil, and sixth-place finisher John Regis of Great Britain; fifth-place finisher Olapade Adeniken of Nigeria was entered but did not start. Michael Johnson, favored to win in Barcelona before food poisoning resulted in a semifinal exit, also returned.

By the summer of 1996, Pietro Mennea's world record of 19.72 had stood for almost 17 years. Carl Lewis (19.75 in 1983), and Marsh (19.73 in 1992) had come tantalizingly close to it, but eased up. Finally at the Olympic Trials, Johnson knocked .06 off the record. In Atlanta, Johnson (the 1995 World Champion) was the clear favorite and was attempting an unprecedented men's 200/400 double. (Two women had done the double; Valerie Brisco-Hooks in 1984 and Marie-José Pérec just completed her double less than ten minutes before the men's 200 metres final). Johnson occupied the same lane 3 as Pérec had just run in. But, just as in 1992, Fredericks (the 1993 World Champion) had snapped a Johnson winning streak shortly before the Games and could not be disregarded as a challenger.

Aruba, Comoros, Gabon, Guam, Ukraine, and the United Arab Emirates each made their debut in the event. The United States made its 21st appearance, most of any nation, having missed only the boycotted 1980 Games.

== Summary ==
From the gun, Johnson took the lead, quickly making up the stagger on Ivan Garcia to his outside halfway through the turn. Coming on to the straight, Johnson led by a metre from Frankie Fredericks and Ato Boldon, with Jeff Williams fourth. Johnson continued to pull away to the finish and won by over three metres from Fredericks, with Boldon a further metre back. Obadele Thompson closed with a strong straight to edge past Williams at the line another three metres behind Boldon. Three strides past the finish line, while others were still finishing, Johnson looked back to see the clock had stopped at 19.32 and began celebrating. His time was a Beamonesque 0.40 of a second faster than the world record had been just five weeks earlier, 0.34 seconds faster than that performance. Far behind him, Fredericks had run 19.68, superior to the 1979 record and Boldon had run 19.80. At that point in time, Fredericks was #2 and Boldon was #7 performer of all time.

== Competition format ==
The competition used the four round format introduced in 1920: heats, quarterfinals, semifinals, and a final. The "fastest loser" system introduced in 1960 was used in the heats and quarterfinals.

There were 11 heats of 7 or 8 runners each, with the top 3 men in each advancing to the quarterfinals along with the next 7 fastest overall. The quarterfinals consisted of 5 heats of 8 athletes each; the 3 fastest men in each heat and the next fastest overall advanced to the semifinals. There were 2 semifinals, each with 8 runners. The top 4 athletes in each semifinal advanced. The final had 8 runners. The races were run on a 400 metre track.

== Records ==
These were the standing world and Olympic records (in seconds) prior to the 1996 Summer Olympics.

World record	Michael Johnson (USA)	19.66	Atlanta, United States	23 June 1996
Olympic record	Michael Marsh (USA)	19.73	Barcelona, Spain	5 August 1992

In the final, Michael Johnson set a new world record with a time of 19.32.

== Schedule ==
All times are Eastern Daylight Time (UTC-4)

The competition returned to a two-day schedule after one Games with three days; now, however, there was no rest day between the two competition days.

Date	Time	Round
Wednesday, 31 July 1996	10:45; 18:15	Heats; Quarterfinals
Thursday, 1 August 1996	19:10; 21:00	Semifinals; Final

== Results ==
=== Heats ===
==== Heat 1 ====
Rank	Athlete	Nation	Time	Notes
1	Michael Marsh	United States	20.27	Q
2	Sergejs Inšakovs	Latvia	20.41	Q
3	Troy Douglas	Bermuda	20.41	Q
4	Steve Brimacombe	Australia	20.45	q
5	Alfred Visagie	South Africa	21.10	
6	Mohamed Al-Houti	Oman	21.10	
7	Takahiro Mazuka	Japan	21.13	

==== Heat 2 ====
Rank	Athlete	Nation	Time	Notes
1	Ivan Garcia	Cuba	20.49	Q
2	Albert Agyemang	Ghana	20.69	Q
3	Elston Cawley	Jamaica	20.73	Q
4	Owusu Dako	Great Britain	20.83	
5	Thomas Sbokos	Greece	20.88	
6	Anton Ivanov	Bulgaria	21.20	
7	David Wilson	Guam	21.85	
8	Mohamed Ould Brahim	Mauritania	22.71	

==== Heat 3 ====
Rank	Athlete	Nation	Time	Notes
1	Ato Boldon	Trinidad and Tobago	20.26	Q
2	Obadele Thompson	Barbados	20.42	Q
3	Anninos Markoullides	Cyprus	20.57	Q
4	Carlos Gats	Argentina	20.82	q
5	Joseph Gikonyo	Kenya	20.88	
6	Chris Donaldson	New Zealand	20.96	
7	Tao Wu-shiun	Chinese Taipei	21.25	

==== Heat 4 ====
Rank	Athlete	Nation	Time	Notes
1	Michael Johnson	United States	20.55	Q
2	Erik Wymeersch	Belgium	20.68	Q
3	Percival Spencer	Jamaica	20.73	Q
4	Frank Waota	Ivory Coast	20.78	q
5	Benjamin Sirimou	Cameroon	21.00	
6	Antoine Boussombo	Gabon	21.06	
—	Venancio Jose	Spain	DNS	

==== Heat 5 ====
Rank	Athlete	Nation	Time	Notes
1	Francis Obikwelu	Nigeria	20.62	Q
2	Edson Ribeiro	Brazil	20.69	Q
3	John Regis	Great Britain	20.78	Q
4	Pierre Lisk	Sierra Leone	20.86	
5	Lars Hedner	Sweden	20.97	
6	Thomas Griesser	Austria	21.20	
7	Pascal Dangbo	Benin	21.65	
8	Hadhari Djaffar	Comoros	22.68	

==== Heat 6 ====
Rank	Athlete	Nation	Time	Notes
1	Patrick Stevens	Belgium	20.60	Q
2	Jordi Mayoral	Spain	20.65	Q
3	Claudinei da Silva	Brazil	20.80	Q
4	Joseph Loua	Guinea	20.81	q
5	Boevi Lawson	Togo	20.99	
6	Anderson Vilien	Haiti	21.62	
7	Peter Ogilvie	Canada	22.00	
8	Gustavo Envela	Equatorial Guinea	22.09	

==== Heat 7 ====
Rank	Athlete	Nation	Time	Notes
1	Linford Christie	Great Britain	20.64	Q
2	Robert Maćkowiak	Poland	20.67	Q
3	George Panayiotopoulos	Greece	20.69	Q
4	Geir Moen	Norway	20.78	q
5	O'Brian Gibbons	Canada	20.79	q
6	Andrey Fedoriv	Russia	20.95	
7	Brahim Abdoulaye	Chad	21.67	

==== Heat 8 ====
Rank	Athlete	Nation	Time	Notes
1	Neil De Silva	Trinidad and Tobago	20.54	Q
2	Robson Da Silva	Brazil	20.61	Q
3	Oumar Loum	Senegal	20.69	Q
4	Dean Capobianco	Australia	20.76	q
5	Matthew Coad	New Zealand	21.25	
6	Amos Ali	Papua New Guinea	21.37	
7	Laurence Jack	Vanuatu	21.94	
—	Olapade Adeniken	Nigeria	DNS	

==== Heat 9 ====
Rank	Athlete	Nation	Time	Notes
1	Jeff Williams	United States	20.37	Q
2	Vladyslav Dolohodin	Ukraine	20.57	Q
3	Francisco Navarro	Spain	20.87	Q
4	Alain Reimann	Switzerland	20.99	
5	Ousmane Diarra	Mali	21.20	
6	Mohamed Al-Aswad	United Arab Emirates	21.77	
—	Ibrahim Ismail Muftah	Qatar	DNS	

==== Heat 10 ====
Rank	Athlete	Nation	Time	Notes
1	Koji Ito	Japan	20.56	Q
2	Torbjorn Eriksson	Sweden	20.77	Q
3	Emmanuel Tuffour	Ghana	20.85	Q
4	Mark Keddell	New Zealand	20.93	
5	Justice Dipeba	Botswana	21.09	
6	Carlton Chambers	Canada	21.32	
7	Miguel Janssen	Aruba	21.72	

==== Heat 11 ====
Rank	Athlete	Nation	Time	Notes
1	Frank Fredericks	Namibia	20.59	Q
2	Seun Ogunkoya	Nigeria	20.78	Q
3	Gary Ryan	Ireland	20.78	Q
4	Sebastian Keitel	Chile	20.96	
5	Christoph Pöstinger	Austria	20.98	
6	Sandro Floris	Italy	21.01	
7	Chen Wenzhong	China	21.05	

=== Quarterfinals ===
==== Quarterfinal 1 ====
Rank	Athlete	Nation	Time	Notes
1	Frank Fredericks	Namibia	20.38	Q
2	Jeff Williams	United States	20.47	Q
3	Obadele Thompson	Barbados	20.53	Q
4	Erik Wymeersch	Belgium	20.59	
5	Percival Spencer	Jamaica	20.59	
6	Troy Douglas	Bermuda	20.63	
7	Francisco Navarro	Spain	21.06	
—	O'Brian Gibbons	Canada	DNS	

==== Quarterfinal 2 ====
Rank	Athlete	Nation	Time	Notes
1	Michael Johnson	United States	20.37	Q
2	Geir Moen	Norway	20.48	Q
3	Neil De Silva	Trinidad and Tobago	20.62	Q
4	Robson Da Silva	Brazil	20.65	
5	Jordi Mayoral	Spain	20.68	
6	George Panayiotopoulos	Greece	20.86	
7	Dean Capobianco	Australia	21.03	
8	Oumar Loum	Senegal	21.31	

==== Quarterfinal 3 ====
Rank	Athlete	Nation	Time	Notes
1	Ivan Garcia	Cuba	20.36	Q
2	Koji Ito	Japan	20.47	Q
3	Steve Brimacombe	Australia	20.53	Q
4	Robert Maćkowiak	Poland	20.61	
5	Anninos Markoullides	Cyprus	20.63	
6	Vladyslav Dolohodin	Ukraine	20.65	
7	Elston Cawley	Jamaica	20.75	
8	Frank Waota	Ivory Coast	21.14	

==== Quarterfinal 4 ====
Rank	Athlete	Nation	Time	Notes
1	Michael Marsh	United States	20.39	Q
2	Patrick Stevens	Belgium	20.43	Q
3	John Regis	Great Britain	20.56	Q
4	Sergejs Inšakovs	Latvia	20.58	q
5	Albert Agyemang	Ghana	20.87	
6	Seun Ogunkoya	Nigeria	21.00	
7	Joseph Loua	Guinea	21.01	
—	Claudinei da Silva	Brazil	DNF	

==== Quarterfinal 5 ====
Rank	Athlete	Nation	Time	Notes
1	Ato Boldon	Trinidad and Tobago	20.25	Q
2	Francis Obikwelu	Nigeria	20.49	Q
3	Emmanuel Tuffour	Ghana	20.49	Q
4	Linford Christie	Great Britain	20.59	
5	Edson Ribeiro	Brazil	20.60	
6	Torbjorn Eriksson	Sweden	20.83	
7	Carlos Gats	Argentina	20.84	
8	Gary Ryan	Ireland	20.89	

=== Semifinals ===
==== Semifinal 1 ====
Rank	Athlete	Nation	Time	Notes
1	Michael Johnson	United States	20.27	Q
2	Ivan Garcia	Cuba	20.34	Q
3	Jeff Williams	United States	20.39	Q
4	Patrick Stevens	Belgium	20.46	Q
5	Francis Obikwelu	Nigeria	20.56	
6	John Regis	Great Britain	20.58	
7	Emmanuel Tuffour	Ghana	20.61	
8	Neil De Silva	Trinidad and Tobago	21.26	

==== Semifinal 2 ====
Rank	Athlete	Nation	Time	Notes
1	Frank Fredericks	Namibia	19.98	Q
2	Ato Boldon	Trinidad and Tobago	20.05	Q
3	Michael Marsh	United States	20.26	Q
4	Obadele Thompson	Barbados	20.32	Q
5	Steve Brimacombe	Australia	20.38	
6	Koji Ito	Japan	20.45	
7	Sergejs Inšakovs	Latvia	20.48	
8	Geir Moen	Norway	20.96	

=== Final ===
Held on August 1, 1996.

Rank	Athlete	Nation	Time	Notes
1st place, gold medalist(s)	Michael Johnson	United States	19.32	WR
2nd place, silver medalist(s)	Frank Fredericks	Namibia	19.68	AR
3rd place, bronze medalist(s)	Ato Boldon	Trinidad and Tobago	19.80	
4	Obadele Thompson	Barbados	20.14	
5	Jeff Williams	United States	20.17	
6	Ivan Garcia	Cuba	20.21	
7	Patrick Stevens	Belgium	20.27	
8	Michael Marsh	United States	20.48	
