= 2000 Ibero-American Championships in Athletics – Results =

These are the results of the 2000 Ibero-American Championships in Athletics which took place on May 20–21, 2000 on Estádio Célio de Barros in Rio de Janeiro, Brazil.

== Men's results ==
=== 100 meters ===
Heats – May 20
Wind:
Heat 1: 0.0 m/s, Heat 2: 0.0 m/s

Rank	Heat	Name	Nationality	Time	Notes
1	1	Raphael de Oliveira	Brazil	10.42	Q
1	2	Vicente de Lima	Brazil	10.42	Q
3	1	Sebastián Keitel	Chile	10.44	Q
4	1	Freddy Mayola	Cuba	10.51	Q
5	2	Luis Alberto Pérez-Rionda	Cuba	10.56	Q
6	2	Heber Viera	Uruguay	10.57	Q
7	1	Jorge Richardson	Puerto Rico	10.63	q
8	2	Gabriel Simón	Argentina	10.65	q
9	2	Juan Morillo	Venezuela	10.66	
9	2	Juan Hernáiz	Puerto Rico	10.70	
10	1	Hely Ollarves	Venezuela	10.72	
11	1	Diego Ferreira	Paraguay	11.01	
	1	Jackson Quinónez	Ecuador	DNS	

Final – May 20
Wind:
0.0 m/s

Rank	Name	Nationality	Time	Notes
1st place, gold medalist(s)	Vicente de Lima	Brazil	10.28	
2nd place, silver medalist(s)	Luis Alberto Pérez-Rionda	Cuba	10.41	
3rd place, bronze medalist(s)	Sebastián Keitel	Chile	10.42	
4	Freddy Mayola	Cuba	10.49	
5	Gabriel Simón	Argentina	10.58	
6	Heber Viera	Uruguay	10.65	
7	Jorge Richardson	Puerto Rico	10.67	
	Raphael de Oliveira	Brazil	DNF	

=== 200 meters ===
Heats – May 21
Wind:
Heat 1: 0.0 m/s, Heat 2: 0.0 m/s

Rank	Heat	Name	Nationality	Time	Notes
1	2	André da Silva	Brazil	20.68	Q
2	1	Claudinei da Silva	Brazil	20.87	Q
3	1	Sebastián Keitel	Chile	21.28	Q
4	1	Heber Viera	Uruguay	21.30	Q
5	2	Ricardo Roach	Chile	21.33	Q
6	2	Jorge Richardson	Puerto Rico	21.54	Q
7	1	Hely Ollarves	Venezuela	21.65	q
8	1	Francisco Javier Navarro	Spain	21.73	q
9	2	Juan Morillo	Venezuela	22.18	
10	2	Diego Ferreira	Paraguay	22.72	
	1	Iván García	Cuba	DNS	
	2	Carlos Gats	Argentina	DNS	

Final – May 21
Wind:
+0.6 m/s

Rank	Name	Nationality	Time	Notes
1st place, gold medalist(s)	Claudinei da Silva	Brazil	20.23	
2nd place, silver medalist(s)	André da Silva	Brazil	20.56	
3rd place, bronze medalist(s)	Sebastián Keitel	Chile	20.77	
4	Heber Viera	Uruguay	21.19	
5	Hely Ollarves	Venezuela	21.37	
6	Ricardo Roach	Chile	21.39	
7	Jorge Richardson	Puerto Rico	21.41	
8	Francisco Javier Navarro	Spain	21.60	

=== 400 meters ===
May 21

Rank	Name	Nationality	Time	Notes
1st place, gold medalist(s)	Sanderlei Parrela	Brazil	44.80	
2nd place, silver medalist(s)	Anderson Jorge dos Santos	Brazil	45.59	
3rd place, bronze medalist(s)	Gustavo Aguirre	Argentina	46.69	
4	Oscar Juanz	Mexico	47.28	
5	Guillermo Mayer	Chile	49.85	
6	Mamadú Djaquité	Guinea-Bissau	50.07	

=== 800 meters ===
May 20

Rank	Name	Nationality	Time	Notes
1st place, gold medalist(s)	Hudson de Souza	Brazil	1:47.18	
2nd place, silver medalist(s)	Márcio de Oliveira	Brazil	1:48.53	
3rd place, bronze medalist(s)	Sergio Gallardo	Spain	1:48.85	
4	Simoncito Silvera	Venezuela	1:50.61	
5	Gabriel López	Argentina	1:50.88	
6	Rodolfo Gómez	Mexico	1:51.83	
7	Amilcar Leal	Mozambique	1:54.30	
8	Jorge Duvane	Mozambique	1:58.76	
	Gustavo Aguirre	Argentina	DNS	

=== 1500 meters ===
May 21

Rank	Name	Nationality	Time	Notes
1st place, gold medalist(s)	Hudson de Souza	Brazil	3:42.21	
2nd place, silver medalist(s)	Manuel Damião	Portugal	3:43.06	
3rd place, bronze medalist(s)	Javier Carriqueo	Argentina	3:44.93	
4	Claudinei Vítor	Brazil	3:44.97	
5	Julián Peralta	Argentina	3:45.03	
6	Manuel Ángel Penas	Spain	3:45.60	
7	Rodolfo Gómez	Mexico	3:51.46	
8	Héctor Torres	Mexico	3:54.13	
9	Simoncito Silvera	Venezuela	4:00.16	
	Danilo Quinatoa	Ecuador	DNS	
	Geovanny Morejon	Bolivia	DNS	
	Jorge Duvane	Mozambique	DNS	

=== 5000 meters ===
May 20

Rank	Name	Nationality	Time	Notes
1st place, gold medalist(s)	José Ramos	Portugal	13:43.86	
2nd place, silver medalist(s)	Pablo Olmedo	Mexico	13:44.44	
3rd place, bronze medalist(s)	Elenilson da Silva	Brazil	13:48.74	
4	Fidencio Torres	Mexico	13:50.17	
5	Valdenor dos Santos	Brazil	13:51.97	
6	Freddy González	Venezuela	14:34.99	
7	Gustavo Pereira	Uruguay	14:42.35	
8	Danilo Quinatoa	Ecuador	15:23.31	
	Julio Cutipa	Peru	DNS	
	Vicente Chura	Peru	DNS	

=== 10,000 meters ===
May 21

Rank	Name	Nationality	Time	Notes
1st place, gold medalist(s)	Elenilson da Silva	Brazil	28:57.98	
2nd place, silver medalist(s)	Marílson Gomes dos Santos	Brazil	28:58.74	
3rd place, bronze medalist(s)	Isaac García	Mexico	28:59.68	
4	Julio Cutipa	Peru	30:33.16	
5	Vicente Chura	Peru	30:57.69	

=== 110 meters hurdles ===
May 21
Wind: 0.0 m/s

Rank	Name	Nationality	Time	Notes
1st place, gold medalist(s)	Márcio de Souza	Brazil	13.76	
2nd place, silver medalist(s)	Redelén dos Santos	Brazil	13.91	
3rd place, bronze medalist(s)	Jackson Quinónez	Ecuador	14.66	
4	Francisco Schilling	Chile	15.15	
	Fredie Nieves	Ecuador	DNS	

=== 400 meters hurdles ===
May 20

Rank	Name	Nationality	Time	Notes
1st place, gold medalist(s)	Eronilde de Araújo	Brazil	49.35	
2nd place, silver medalist(s)	Carlos Zbinden	Chile	50.32	
3rd place, bronze medalist(s)	Anderson Costa dos Santos	Brazil	50.59	
4	Curt Young	Panama	50.88	
5	Jaime Juan	Spain	51.38	
6	Jorge Chaverra	Colombia	51.83	
	Jackson Quinónez	Ecuador	DNS	

=== 3000 meters steeplechase ===
May 21

Rank	Name	Nationality	Time	Notes
1st place, gold medalist(s)	José Luis Blanco	Spain	8:28.44	
2nd place, silver medalist(s)	Salvador Miranda	Mexico	8:28.80	
3rd place, bronze medalist(s)	José María González	Spain	8:30.96	
4	Adelar José Schuler	Brazil	8:38.10	
5	Néstor Nieves	Venezuela	8:38.81	
6	Celso Ficagna	Brazil	8:39.07	
7	Richard Arias	Ecuador	9:00.56	
8	Sebastián Pino	Chile	9:16.24	
9	Geovanny Morejon	Bolivia	9:29.35	

=== 4 × 100 meters relay ===
May 20

Rank	Nation	Competitors	Time	Notes
1st place, gold medalist(s)	Brazil	Vicente de Lima, Édson Ribeiro, André da Silva, Claudinei da Silva	38.24	CR
2nd place, silver medalist(s)	Cuba	José Ángel César, Luis Alberto Pérez-Rionda, Iván García, Freddy Mayola	38.97	
3rd place, bronze medalist(s)	Chile	Juan Pablo Faúndez, Ricardo Roach, Sebastián Keitel, Rodrigo Roach	39.90	
4	Argentina	Iván Altamirano, Carlos Gats, Nicolás Arias, Gabriel Simón	40.26	
5	Puerto Rico	Juan Hernáiz, Osvaldo Nieves, Félix Omar Fernández, Jorge Richardson	40.40	

=== 4 × 400 meters relay ===
May 21

Rank	Nation	Competitors	Time	Notes
1st place, gold medalist(s)	Brazil	Anderson Jorge dos Santos, Sanderlei Parrela, Luis Antônio Eloi, Valdinei da Silva	3:03.33	
2nd place, silver medalist(s)	Chile	Ricardo Roach, Guillermo Meyer, Carlos Zbinden, Rodrigo Roach	3:10.86	
3rd place, bronze medalist(s)	Argentina	Carlos Gats, Gustavo Aguirre, Iván Altamirano, Gabriel López	3:12.45	
	Brazil B	Ediélson Rocha Tenório, Eronilde de Araújo, Inácio Leao Filho, Wagner Souza	3:05.18	

=== 20,000 meters walk ===
May 20

Rank	Name	Nationality	Time	Notes
1st place, gold medalist(s)	Noé Hernández	Mexico	1:24:50.46	
2nd place, silver medalist(s)	João Vieira	Portugal	1:26:37.78	
3rd place, bronze medalist(s)	Ricardo Alexandre Reinert	Brazil	1:32:43.63	
4	Luis Villagra	Chile	1:38:05.15	
	Jorge Segura	Mexico	DQ	
	Oscar Meza	Paraguay	DQ	
	Sérgio Galdino	Brazil	DNF	
	Nixon Zambrano	Colombia	DNF	

=== High jump ===
May 20

Rank	Name	Nationality	2.00	2.05	2.10	2.15	2.18	2.20	2.22	2.24	2.26	Result	Notes
1st place, gold medalist(s)	Gilmar Mayo	Colombia	–	–	o	o	xo	–	xo	o	xxx	2.24	
2nd place, silver medalist(s)	Fabricio Romero	Brazil	–	–	o	xo	o	xo	o	xo	xxx	2.24	
3rd place, bronze medalist(s)	David Antona	Spain	–	o	–	o	–	xo	o	xxx		2.22	
4	Erasmo Jara	Argentina	–	o	o	xxo	xxx					2.15	
5	Miguel de Lucas	Spain	–	o	o	xxx						2.10	
6	Alfredo Deza	Peru	–	o	xxo	xxx						2.10	
7	Jackson Quiñónez	Ecuador	o	o	xxx							2.05	
	Jessé de Lima	Brazil	–	–	xxx							NM	
	Hugo Muñoz	Peru	–	–	xxx							NM	

=== Pole vault ===
May 20

Rank	Name	Nationality	4.60	4.80	4.90	5.00	5.10	5.20	5.30	Result	Notes
1st place, gold medalist(s)	Nuno Fernandes	Portugal	–	–	o	–	–	o	xxx	5.20	
2nd place, silver medalist(s)	Robison Pratt	Mexico	–	–	–	xo	–	xxo	xxx	5.20	
3rd place, bronze medalist(s)	Edgar Díaz	Puerto Rico	–	–	–	o	o	xxx		5.10	
4	Makirk Ramos	Puerto Rico	xo	o	o	o	xxx			5.00	
5	Javier Gazol	Spain	–	–	–	xo	xxx			5.00	
6	Gustavo Rehder	Brazil	–	–	o	–	xxx			4.90	
7	Henrique Martins	Brazil	o	o	xxx					4.80	
8	José Francisco Nava	Chile	xo	xxx						4.60	
	Gustavo Alzugaray	Uruguay	xxx							NM	
	Javier Benítez	Argentina	–	xxx						NM	
	Edgar León	Mexico	–	–	–	xxx				NM	
	Ricardo Diez	Venezuela	–	–	–	xxx				NM	

=== Long jump ===
May 20

Rank	Name	Nationality	#1	#2	#3	#4	#5	#6	Result	Notes
1st place, gold medalist(s)	Nelson Carlos Ferreira Jr.	Brazil	7.89	7.76	7.59	7.90	5.78	x	7.90	
2nd place, silver medalist(s)	Esteban Copland	Venezuela	x	7.72	x	x	7.56	7.81	7.81	
3rd place, bronze medalist(s)	Joan Lino Martínez	Cuba	x	7.66	7.71	7.60	6.12	–	7.71	
4	Claudio Bossay	Chile	7.11	6.90	7.15	7.31	7.39	7.68	7.68	
5	José Joaquín Reyes	Venezuela	7.22	6.70	7.42	7.61	–	x	7.61	
6	Cristián Antivilo	Chile	x	7.21	7.24	7.32	7.19	7.46	7.46	
7	Sérgio Zacarias Cossa	Mozambique	7.05	7.26	7.08	6.99	6.98	7.22	7.26	
8	Sérgio dos Santos	Brazil	x	x	7.15	x	x	x	7.15	
9	Elmer Williams	Puerto Rico	7.08	5.95	–				7.08	

=== Triple jump ===
May 21

Rank	Name	Nationality	#1	#2	#3	#4	#5	#6	Result	Notes
1st place, gold medalist(s)	Michael Calvo	Cuba	16.84	17.02	17.00	x	16.94	17.05	17.05	CR
2nd place, silver medalist(s)	Rodrigo Mendes	Brazil	16.76	x	16.47	16.62	x	16.28w	16.76	
3rd place, bronze medalist(s)	Antônio da Costa	Brazil	15.78	15.64	15.51	x	15.68	x	16.78	
4	Fredie Nieves	Ecuador	14.78	15.04	15.28	15.39	15.21	15.18	15.39	

=== Shot put ===
May 20

Rank	Name	Nationality	#1	#2	#3	#4	#5	#6	Result	Notes
1st place, gold medalist(s)	Manuel Martínez	Spain	18.88	x	19.19	19.24	19.13	19.70	19.70	
2nd place, silver medalist(s)	Yojer Medina	Venezuela	18.66	18.89	18.55	x	x	x	18.89	
3rd place, bronze medalist(s)	Iker Sukía	Spain	x	17.90	x	17.84	18.17	17.99	18.17	
4	Marco Antonio Verni	Chile	17.52	x	18.10	x	17.77	x	18.10	
5	Édson Miguel	Brazil	17.82	x	16.91	17.55	17.35	17.52	17.82	
6	Jhonny Rodríguez	Colombia	16.84	16.93	16.90	16.84	17.21	17.24	17.24	
7	Mateus Monari	Brazil	15.70	14.80	15.99	15.87	15.50	x	15.99	
8	Edson Haroldo Monzón	Guatemala	14.45	14.82	x	x	15.12	15.37	15.37	

=== Discus throw ===
May 21

Rank	Name	Nationality	#1	#2	#3	#4	#5	#6	Result	Notes
1st place, gold medalist(s)	Frank Casanas	Cuba	57.04	57.12	59.87	56.31	57.64	59.85	59.87	
2nd place, silver medalist(s)	Marcelo Pugliese	Argentina	56.07	58.14	54.23	x	56.91	55.68	58.14	
3rd place, bronze medalist(s)	Mario Pestano	Spain	55.12	56.85	55.72	56.90	x	57.17	57.17	
4	Julio Piñero	Argentina	54.85	55.34	54.96	56.79	–	54.41	56.79	
5	Paulo Bernardo	Portugal	51.09	55.31	x	53.05	53.38	x	55.31	
6	Celso Gomes	Brazil	50.44	x	52.82	54.36	52.86	52.61	54.36	
7	Alfredo Romero	Puerto Rico	51.72	50.82	50.45	50.16	51.98	x	51.98	
8	Marco Antonio Verni	Chile	47.62	48.09	48.48	47.71	x	44.81	48.48	
9	João Joaquim dos Santos	Brazil	x	x	48.33				48.33	

=== Hammer throw ===
May 21

Rank	Name	Nationality	#1	#2	#3	#4	#5	#6	Result	Notes
1st place, gold medalist(s)	Juan Ignacio Cerra	Argentina	72.09	73.46	x	73.65	74.32	x	74.32	
2nd place, silver medalist(s)	Vítor Costa	Portugal	71.09	x	71.52	71.76	71.78	72.36	72.36	
3rd place, bronze medalist(s)	José Manuel Pérez	Spain	66.73	69.60	70.67	x	69.08	68.96	70.67	
4	Moisés Campeny	Spain	x	65.36	64.44	63.36	x	66.58	66.58	
5	Adrián Marzo	Argentina	x	66.23	66.36	65.98	x	64.90	66.36	
6	José Manuel Llano	Chile	57.27	50.76	59.71	62.18	60.99	63.51	63.51	
7	Aldo Bello	Venezuela	63.03	61.58	63.19	x	x	62.53	63.19	
8	Santos Veja	Puerto Rico	60.09	x	57.04	58.19	x	57.81	60.09	
9	Ivam Bertelli	Brazil	50.55	54.68	50.72				54.68	
10	Mário Leme	Brazil	54.07	x	x				54.07	
11	Raúl Rivera	Guatemala	45.80	53.56	53.39				53.56	

=== Javelin throw ===
May 20

Rank	Name	Nationality	#1	#2	#3	#4	#5	#6	Result	Notes
1st place, gold medalist(s)	Emeterio González	Cuba	75.09	80.02	x	x	x	x	80.02	
2nd place, silver medalist(s)	Nery Kennedy	Paraguay	75.60	x	71.63	70.80	74.31	70.95	75.60	
3rd place, bronze medalist(s)	Diego Moraga	Chile	x	60.19	66.68	67.91	72.46	x	72.46	
4	Luiz Fernando da Silva	Brazil	68.43	70.91	69.27	69.50	x	71.92	71.92	
5	Michael Musselmann	Peru	65.20	67.89	63.29	66.88	64.82	63.76	67.89	
6	Luis Lucumí	Colombia	65.20	62.35	x	–	–	–	65.20	
7	Alberto Laratro	Paraguay	58.95	x	58.06	62.42	61.30	58.65	62.42	
8	Jackson Martini	Brazil	61.53	60.89	x	x	62.32	59.06	62.32	
9	Andrés Bondurant	Guatemala	49.42	56.74	53.68				56.74	

=== Decathlon ===
May 20–21

The highest mark recorded in each event is highlighted in yellow

Rank	Athlete	Nationality	100m	LJ	SP	HJ	400m	110m H	DT	PV	JT	1500m	Points	Notes
1st place, gold medalist(s)	Edson Bindilatti	Brazil	10.97	6.96	12.00	2.00	47.78	14.99	38.33	4.60	44.06	4:26.72	7538	
2nd place, silver medalist(s)	Edemar dos Santos	Brazil	11.30	6.64	12.49	1.85	49.10	15.08	38.39	4.60	54.37	4:21.10	7406	
3rd place, bronze medalist(s)	Enrique Aguirre	Argentina	11.21	6.89	12.25	1.91	50.17	15.31	35.97	4.30	45.26	4:57.75	6943	
4	Cristián Lyon	Chile	11.57	6.70	11.38	1.94	52.04	16.08	27.33	4.60	35.91	5:03.04	6373	
5	Luiggy Llanos	Puerto Rico	10.77	6.88	12.74	1.85	48.42	15.18	31.30	NM	57.26	5:27.03	6336	
6	Antonio Morales	Panama	11.39	6.44	11.59	2.03	49.82	15.90	35.04	NM	37.99	4:39.95	6098	
	Rubén Arcía	Venezuela	11.37	5.96	11.51	1.85	DNF	DNS	–	–	–	–	DNF	

== Women's results ==
=== 100 meters ===
Heats – May 20
Wind:
Heat 1: 0.0 m/s, Heat 2: 0.0 m/s

Rank	Heat	Name	Nationality	Time	Notes
1	1	Liliana Allen	Mexico	11.48	Q
2	2	Rosemar Coelho Neto	Brazil	11.66	Q
3	1	Lucimar de Moura	Brazil	11.68	Q
4	1	Mirtha Brock	Colombia	11.71	Q
5	1	Julia Alba	Spain	11.81	q
6	1	Elisa Cossa	Mozambique	11.85	q
7	2	Lisette Rondón	Chile	11.86	Q
8	1	María Izabel Coloma	Chile	11.94	
9	1	Jennifer Caraballo	Puerto Rico	12.07	
10	2	Vanesa Wohlgemuth	Argentina	12.14	Q
11	2	Digna Luz Murillo	Colombia	12.28	
12	2	Marcela Tiscornia	Uruguay	12.31	
13	2	Daineski Pérez	Cuba	12.44	

Final – May 20
Wind:
0.0 m/s

Rank	Name	Nationality	Time	Notes
1st place, gold medalist(s)	Liliana Allen	Mexico	11.57	
2nd place, silver medalist(s)	Rosemar Coelho Neto	Brazil	11.67	
3rd place, bronze medalist(s)	Mirtha Brock	Colombia	11.70	
4	Lucimar de Moura	Brazil	11.73	
5	Lisette Rondón	Chile	11.90	
6	Elisa Cossa	Mozambique	11.90	
7	Julia Alba	Spain	11.90	
8	Vanesa Wohlgemuth	Argentina	12.25	

=== 200 meters ===
Heats – May 21
Wind:
Heat 1: +1.6 m/s, Heat 2: 0.0 m/s

Rank	Heat	Name	Nationality	Time	Notes
1	1	Felipa Palacios	Colombia	23.54	Q
2	1	Julia Alba	Spain	23.99	Q
3	2	Liliana Allen	Mexico	24.32	Q
4	1	Lucimar de Moura	Brazil	24.35	Q
5	2	Lisette Rondón	Chile	24.38	Q
6	2	Lorena de Oliveira	Brazil	24.47	Q
7	1	Heysha Ortiz	Puerto Rico	24.67	q
8	2	Vanesa Wohlgemuth	Argentina	24.95	q
9	1	Marcela Tiscornia	Uruguay	25.32	
	1	Mayra González	Mexico	DNS	
	1	Elisa Cossa	Mozambique	DNS	
	2	Jennifer Caraballo	Puerto Rico	DNS	
	2	Digna Luz Murillo	Colombia	DNS	

Final – May 21
Wind:
-1.0 m/s

Rank	Name	Nationality	Time	Notes
1st place, gold medalist(s)	Felipa Palacios	Colombia	23.18	
2nd place, silver medalist(s)	Liliana Allen	Mexico	23.66	
3rd place, bronze medalist(s)	Julia Alba	Spain	23.93	
4	Lisette Rondón	Chile	24.21	
5	Lucimar de Moura	Brazil	24.27	
6	Lorena de Oliveira	Brazil	24.78	
7	Vanesa Wohlgemuth	Argentina	24.82	
8	Heysha Ortiz	Puerto Rico	24.95	

=== 400 meters ===
May 21

Rank	Name	Nationality	Time	Notes
1st place, gold medalist(s)	Norma González	Colombia	53.00	
2nd place, silver medalist(s)	Lorena de Oliveira	Brazil	53.18	
3rd place, bronze medalist(s)	Luciana Mendes	Brazil	53.18	
4	Fabiola Hecht	Chile	58.79	
	Mayra González	Mexico	DNS	
	Mariela Álvarez	Peru	DNS	

=== 800 meters ===
May 20

Rank	Name	Nationality	Time	Notes
1st place, gold medalist(s)	Luciana Mendes	Brazil	2:01.77	
2nd place, silver medalist(s)	Mayte Martínez	Spain	2:04.02	
3rd place, bronze medalist(s)	Sandra Moya	Puerto Rico	2:05.61	
4	Célia dos Santos	Brazil	2:06.45	
5	Janeth Lucumí	Colombia	2:07.01	
6	Mariela Álvarez	Peru	2:10.09	
7	María Peralta	Argentina	2:15.50	

=== 1500 meters ===
May 21

Rank	Name	Nationality	Time	Notes
1st place, gold medalist(s)	Nuria Fernández	Spain	4:18.03	
2nd place, silver medalist(s)	Rocío Rodríguez	Spain	4:19.78	
3rd place, bronze medalist(s)	Niusha Mancilla	Bolivia	4:20.02	
4	Célia dos Santos	Brazil	4:22.23	
5	Valentina Medina	Venezuela	4:27.87	
6	Elena Guerra	Uruguay	4:27.98	NR
7	María Peralta	Argentina	4:28.89	
8	María Paredes	Ecuador	4:29.53	
9	Magda Margarete Azevedo	Brazil	4:33.95	
	Margarita Tapia	Mexico	DNS	

=== 5000 meters ===
May 20

Rank	Name	Nationality	Time	Notes
1st place, gold medalist(s)	Fernanda Ribeiro	Portugal	15:29.47	
2nd place, silver medalist(s)	María Abel	Spain	15:40.18	
3rd place, bronze medalist(s)	América Mateos	Mexico	15:42.19	
4	Margarita Tapia	Mexico	15:44.07	
5	Érika Olivera	Chile	15:51.45	
6	Maria Cristina Rodrigues	Brazil	16:14.99	
7	Elisa Cobañea	Argentina	16:19.21	
8	Selma Cândida dos Reis	Brazil	16:27.07	
9	María Paredes	Ecuador	16:33.67	
10	Valentina Medina	Venezuela	17:09.24	
	Niusha Mancilla	Bolivia	DNS	
	María Cristina Petite	Spain	DNS	

=== 10,000 meters ===
May 21

Rank	Name	Nationality	Time	Notes
1st place, gold medalist(s)	Érika Olivera	Chile	33:39.16	
2nd place, silver medalist(s)	Isabel Juárez	Mexico	34:37.03	
3rd place, bronze medalist(s)	Maria Cristina Rodrigues	Brazil	34:45.99	
4	Nadir de Siqueira	Brazil	35:15.25	
5	Claudia Camargo	Argentina	36:50.62	

=== 100 meters hurdles ===
Heats – May 21
Wind:
Heat 1: +0.6 m/s, Heat 2: 0.0 m/s

Rank	Heat	Name	Nationality	Time	Notes
1	2	Nerea Azkárate	Spain	13.43	Q
2	2	Gilvaneide de Oliveira	Brazil	13.47	Q
3	1	Yahumara Neyra	Cuba	13.48	Q
4	1	Maíla Machado	Brazil	13.55	Q
5	1	Isabel Abrantes	Portugal	13.60	Q
6	2	Princesa Oliveros	Colombia	13.70	Q
7	2	Katia Brito Speek	Cuba	14.02	q
8	1	Verónica Depaoli	Argentina	14.32	q
9	1	Francisca Guzmán	Chile	14.35	
10	1	Denise Jerez Agueda	Guatemala	16.28	
	2	Tamara Chourio	Venezuela	DQ	R162.6

May 21
Wind:
+0.9 m/s

Rank	Name	Nationality	Time	Notes
1st place, gold medalist(s)	Yahumara Neyra	Cuba	13.17	
2nd place, silver medalist(s)	Maíla Machado	Brazil	13.25	
3rd place, bronze medalist(s)	Isabel Abrantes	Portugal	13.30	
4	Princesa Oliveros	Colombia	13.82	
5	Katia Brito Speek	Cuba	13.89	
6	Nerea Azkárate	Spain	16.44	
	Gilvaneide de Oliveira	Brazil	DNF	
	Verónica Depaoli	Argentina	DNS	

=== 400 meters hurdles ===
May 20

Rank	Name	Nationality	Time	Notes
1st place, gold medalist(s)	Ana Paula Pereira	Brazil	57.59	
2nd place, silver medalist(s)	Jupira da Graça	Brazil	58.48	
3rd place, bronze medalist(s)	Mayte Urcelay	Spain	58.90	
4	Katia Brito Speek	Cuba	59.06	
5	Princesa Oliveros	Colombia	59.18	
6	Yamelis Ortiz	Puerto Rico	59.47	

=== 3000 meters steeplechase ===
May 20

Rank	Name	Nationality	Time	Notes
1st place, gold medalist(s)	Soraya Telles-Teixeira	Brazil	10:49.52	CR
2nd place, silver medalist(s)	Alcina dos Reis	Brazil	10:52.81	
3rd place, bronze medalist(s)	Verónica Páez	Argentina	11:34.67	

=== 4 × 100 meters relay ===
May 20

Rank	Nation	Competitors	Time	Notes
1st place, gold medalist(s)	Colombia	Mirtha Brock, Felipa Palacios, Norma González, Princesa Oliveros	44.81	
2nd place, silver medalist(s)	Brazil	Lucimar de Moura, Claudete Alves Pina, Kátia Regina Santos, Cleide Amaral	45.16	
3rd place, bronze medalist(s)	Puerto Rico	Jennifer Caraballo, Heysha Ortiz, Yesenia Rivera, Damaris Diana	45.26	
4	Chile	Lisette Rondón, María Izabel Coloma, Daniela Pávez, María José Echevarría	45.84	

=== 4 × 400 meters relay ===
May 21

Rank	Nation	Competitors	Time	Notes
1st place, gold medalist(s)	Colombia	Mirtha Brock, Felipa Palacios, Norma González, Janeth Lucumí	3:34.51	
2nd place, silver medalist(s)	Puerto Rico	Sandra Moya, Yamelis Ortiz, Beatriz Cruz, Maritza Salas	3:34.95	
3rd place, bronze medalist(s)	Brazil	Ana Paula Pereira, Jupira da Graça, Maria Laura Almirão, Claudete Alves Pina	3:36.07	
4	Chile	Lisette Rondón, Fabiola Hecht, Daniela Pávez, María José Echebarría	3:56.30	

=== 10,000 meters walk ===
May 20

Rank	Name	Nationality	Time	Notes
1st place, gold medalist(s)	Rosario Sánchez	Mexico	45:38.90	
2nd place, silver medalist(s)	Geovanna Irusta	Bolivia	45:59.95	
3rd place, bronze medalist(s)	Teresa Linares	Spain	46:36.86	
4	Abigail Sáenz	Mexico	46:51.55	
5	Gianetti Bonfim	Brazil	49:47.01	
6	Andreia Pedro	Brazil	52:56.67	

=== High jump ===
May 21

Rank	Name	Nationality	1.65	1.70	1.75	1.78	1.81	1.84	1.87	1.90	Result	Notes
1st place, gold medalist(s)	Solange Witteveen	Argentina	–	o	o	o	o	xo	o	xxx	1.87	
2nd place, silver medalist(s)	Marta Mendía	Spain	–	o	–	o	o	xxo	xxx		1.84	
3rd place, bronze medalist(s)	Luciane Dambacher	Brazil	o	o	o	o	o	xxx			1.81	
4	Ruth Beitia	Spain	o	o	xo	o	xo	xxx			1.81	
5	Thaís de Andrade	Brazil	o	o	xo	o	xxo	xxx			1.81	
6	Romary Rifka	Mexico	–	o	xo	xo	xxx				1.78	
7	Ana María Urrutia	Chile	o	xxx							1.65	

=== Pole vault ===
May 21

Rank	Name	Nationality	3.05	3.10	3.20	3.30	3.40	3.50	3.60	3.70	3.80	3.85	3.90	4.00	4.15	4.30	4.43	Result	Notes
1st place, gold medalist(s)	Alejandra García	Argentina	–	–	–	–	–	–	o	–	–	–	–	o	o	o	xxx	4.30	
2nd place, silver medalist(s)	Paula Fernández	Spain	–	–	–	–	–	–	o	–	o	–	–	xo	xxx			4.00	
3rd place, bronze medalist(s)	Elisabete Tavares	Portugal	–	–	–	–	–	o	–	o	xxo	–	xxo	xxx				3.90	
4	Lorena Espinoza	Mexico	–	–	–	–	xo	o	xxo	o	xxo	xxx						3.80	
5	Fabiana Murer	Brazil	–	–	–	–	xo	–	o	o	xxx							3.70	
6	Yoisemil Fuentes	Venezuela	–	–	–	xo	o	xxo	o	xxx								3.60	
7	Alejandra Meza	Mexico	–	–	–	–	o	o	xxx									3.50	
8	Joana Costa	Brazil	x–	o	xo	xo	xxo	xxo	xxx									3.50	
	Denise Jerez Agueda	Guatemala	xxx															NM	

=== Long jump ===
May 20

Rank	Name	Nationality	#1	#2	#3	#4	#5	#6	Result	Notes
1st place, gold medalist(s)	Maurren Maggi	Brazil	6.56	6.70	6.18	–	–	–	6.70	
2nd place, silver medalist(s)	Andrea Ávila	Argentina	6.18	6.41	6.24	x	6.21	6.34	6.41	
3rd place, bronze medalist(s)	Luciana dos Santos	Brazil	5.91	6.13	6.24	6.12	6.28	6.19	6.28	
4	Betsabee Berrios	Puerto Rico	5.96	6.15	x	6.26	5.75	6.21	6.26	
5	Marta Godinho	Portugal	5.92	5.99	6.16	5.83	6.23	6.04	6.23	
6	Elisa Cossa	Mozambique	x	x	x	5.79	5.71	x	5.79	
7	Yesenia Rivera	Puerto Rico	x	x	x	5.59	x	5.79	5.79	
8	Mónica Falcioni	Uruguay	5.70	5.61	5.67	5.61	–	–	5.70	

=== Triple jump ===
May 21

Rank	Name	Nationality	#1	#2	#3	#4	#5	#6	Result	Notes
1st place, gold medalist(s)	Carlota Castrejana	Spain	x	13.59	x	x	13.47	13.61	13.61	
2nd place, silver medalist(s)	Luciana dos Santos	Brazil	13.19	13.40	12.64	13.26	13.46	x	13.46	
3rd place, bronze medalist(s)	Mónica Falcioni	Uruguay	12.64	12.86	12.79	12.86	12.92	12.81	12.92	
4	Jennifer Arveláez	Venezuela	12.37	12.92	12.41	12.54	12.84	12.59	12.92	
5	Ana Messias	Brazil	12.40	x	12.35	12.79	x	12.44	12.79	
6	Betsabee Berrios	Puerto Rico	x	12.31	11.64	x	–	–	12.31	
	Andrea Ávila	Argentina	x	–	–	–	–	–	DNF	

=== Shot put ===
May 21

Rank	Name	Nationality	#1	#2	#3	#4	#5	#6	Result	Notes
1st place, gold medalist(s)	Martina de la Puente	Spain	17.44	16.87	17.21	x	17.00	17.09	17.44	
2nd place, silver medalist(s)	Marianne Berndt	Chile	14.15	x	15.07	14.40	14.60	14.94	15.07	
3rd place, bronze medalist(s)	Andréa Maria Pereira	Brazil	14.04	14.62	14.79	14.72	14.53	14.86	14.86	
4	Alexandra Teixeira	Brazil	x	x	14.27	14.45	14.85	x	14.85	
5	Neolanis Suárez	Venezuela	13.69	13.50	13.50	13.66	x	13.22	13.69	

=== Discus throw ===
May 20

Rank	Name	Nationality	#1	#2	#3	#4	#5	#6	Result	Notes
1st place, gold medalist(s)	Katiuscia de Jesus	Brazil	49.97	49.15	51.41	45.28	45.68	46.22	51.41	
2nd place, silver medalist(s)	Neolanis Suárez	Venezuela	x	48.75	x	48.28	49.49	48.27	49.49	
3rd place, bronze medalist(s)	Fanny García	Venezuela	45.06	x	49.41	48.49	48.94	49.45	49.45	
4	Fátima Germano	Brazil	43.32	46.23	48.03	45.44	45.63	46.24	48.03	
5	Ana Lucía Espinoza	Guatemala	36.74	42.46	40.18	41.50	x	43.74	43.74	
6	Marisol Bengoa	Chile	42.43	38.42	40.42	39.43	41.78	40.33	42.43	

=== Hammer throw ===
May 20

Rank	Name	Nationality	#1	#2	#3	#4	#5	#6	Result	Notes
1st place, gold medalist(s)	Dolores Pedrares	Spain	57.80	61.39	59.62	58.34	x	59.29	61.39	
2nd place, silver medalist(s)	Karina Moya	Argentina	56.57	58.30	58.03	57.64	58.90	x	58.90	
3rd place, bronze medalist(s)	Vânia Silva	Portugal	x	x	52.40	x	56.15	57.35	57.35	
4	María Eugenia Villamizar	Colombia	56.37	x	54.48	x	53.03	54.14	56.37	
5	Josiane Soares	Brazil	x	55.09	x	x	x	56.25	56.25	
6	Margit Wahlbrink	Brazil	54.35	x	48.77	48.53	x	50.23	54.35	
7	Erika Melián	Argentina	51.52	51.74	x	x	x	x	51.74	
8	Ana Lucía Espinoza	Guatemala	49.29	47.01	48.06	48.86	47.28	46.48	49.29	
9	Marisol Bengoa	Chile	42.63	42.79	48.83				48.83	
10	María Mercedes Melogno	Uruguay	48.33	x	x				48.33	
11	Silcana Avila	Uruguay	45.22	46.49	47.34				47.34	
12	Odette Palma	Chile	46.34	46.59	46.67				46.67	

=== Javelin throw ===
May 21

Rank	Name	Nationality	#1	#2	#3	#4	#5	#6	Result	Notes
1st place, gold medalist(s)	Xiomara Rivero	Cuba	60.43	x	59.87	57.96	59.65	58.41	60.43	
2nd place, silver medalist(s)	Sueli dos Santos	Brazil	54.54	58.94	x	x	57.97	56.31	58.94	
3rd place, bronze medalist(s)	Mercedes Chilla	Spain	54.97	48.27	51.29	49.88	53.44	55.99	55.99	
4	Sabina Moya	Colombia	48.54	x	54.81	54.95	x	55.16	55.16	
5	Alessandra Resende	Brazil	x	51.02	x	41.31	50.07	51.22	51.22	
6	Leryn Franco	Paraguay	43.65	45.08	42.66	44.60	41.30	44.73	45.08	

=== Heptathlon ===
May 20–21

The highest mark recorded in each event is highlighted in yellow

Rank	Athlete	Nationality	100m H	HJ	SP	200m	LJ	JT	800m	Points	Notes
1st place, gold medalist(s)	Mónica Marques	Brazil	14.82	1.79	13.17	26.11	6.19	33.53	2:31.87	5480	
2nd place, silver medalist(s)	Enezenaide Gomes	São Tomé and Príncipe	14.53	1.76	12.90	26.35	6.04	36.59	2:31.20	5463	
3rd place, bronze medalist(s)	Patrícia de Souza	Brazil	13.77	1.55	11.24	25.06	5.42	30.49	2:38.84	4930	
