= 1997 World Championships in Athletics – Men's 200 metres =

Men's 200 metres at the 1997 World Championships
- Venue: Olympic Stadium
- Dates: 6 August (heats and quarter-finals); 7 August (semi-finals); 8 August (final)
- Competitors: 63
- Winning time: 20.03

Medalists
gold medal	Ato Boldon	Trinidad and Tobago
silver medal	Frankie Fredericks	Namibia
bronze medal	Claudinei da Silva	Brazil

Official Video

These are the results of the Men's 200 metres event at the 1997 World Championships in Athletics in Athens, Greece. The winning margin was 0.20 seconds.

== Medalists ==
Gold	Ato Boldon; Trinidad and Tobago (TRI)
Silver	Frank Fredericks; Namibia (NAM)
Bronze	Claudinei da Silva; Brazil (BRA)

== Results ==
=== Heats ===
First 3 of each Heat (Q) and the next 5 fastest (q) qualified for the quarterfinals.

Rank	Heat	Name	Nationality	Time	Notes
1	9	Iván García	Cuba	20.41	Q
2	4	Patrick Stevens	Belgium	20.45	Q
3	9	Troy Douglas	Bermuda	20.46	Q
4	9	Anninos Marcoullides	Cyprus	20.47	Q
5	1	Ato Boldon	Trinidad and Tobago	20.48	Q
6	1	Douglas Walker	Great Britain	20.49	Q, PB
6	4	Julian Golding	Great Britain	20.49	Q
8	9	Sergey Osovich	Ukraine	20.56	q
9	7	Claudinei da Silva	Brazil	20.59	Q
10	1	Georgios Panagiotopoulos	Greece	20.60	Q
11	1	Deji Aliu	Nigeria	20.60	q
12	6	Kevin Little	United States	20.68	Q
13	6	Gary Ryan	Ireland	20.69	Q, NR
14	6	Owusu Dako	Great Britain	20.70	Q, SB
15	1	O'Brian Gibbons	Canada	20.71	q, SB
15	2	Erik Wijmeersch	Belgium	20.71	Q, SB
17	1	Emmanuel Tuffour	Ghana	20.72	q, SB
17	3	Sergejs Inšakovs	Latvia	20.72	Q, SB
17	9	Sebastián Keitel	Chile	20.72	q
20	5	Giovanni Puggioni	Italy	20.73	Q
21	2	Frankie Fredericks	Namibia	20.74	Q
22	3	Obadele Thompson	Barbados	20.75	Q
22	5	Joseph Loua	Guinea	20.75	Q
22	6	Steve Brimacombe	Australia	20.75	
22	7	Chris Donaldson	New Zealand	20.75	Q
26	5	Jon Drummond	United States	20.76	Q
27	3	Prodromos Katsantonis	Cyprus	20.77	Q
27	5	Christoph Postinger	Austria	20.77	
29	5	Antoine Boussombo	Gabon	20.79	NR
29	8	Geir Moen	Norway	20.79	Q
31	8	Gentry Bradley	United States	20.80	Q
31	5	Thierry Lubin	France	20.80	
33	3	Koji Ito	Japan	20.82	
34	7	Ioannis Nafpliotis	Greece	20.84	Q
35	8	Carlos Gats	Argentina	20.86	Q
36	2	Sayon Cooper	Liberia	20.88	Q
36	2	Phillip Mukomana	Zimbabwe	20.88	SB
36	7	Andrey Fedoriv	Russia	20.88	
39	4	Carlo Occhiena	Italy	20.90	Q
40	6	Alessandro Attene	Italy	20.92	
41	4	Gilles Quénéhervé	France	20.93	
42	8	Thomas Sbokos	Greece	20.94	
43	8	Oumar Loum	Senegal	20.95	
44	2	Justice Dipeba	Botswana	20.96	SB
45	4	Ryszard Pilarczyk	Poland	20.98	
46	7	Jordi Mayoral	Spain	20.99	
47	6	Andrew Tynes	Bahamas	21.00	
48	3	Juan Pedro Toledo	Mexico	21.03	
49	8	Ahmed Douhou	Ivory Coast	21.08	
50	3	Lars Hedner	Sweden	21.30	
51	9	Malik-Khaled Louahla	Algeria	21.31	
52	1	Hamoud Abdallah Al-Dalhami	Oman	21.45	
52	2	Patrick Johnson	Australia	21.45	
52	8	Benjamin Sirimou	Cameroon	21.45	
55	4	Pascal Dangbo	Benin	21.58	
56	8	Djaffar Hadhari	Comoros	21.59	NR
57	4	Kendon Maynard	United States Virgin Islands	21.64	
58	3	Tao Wu-Shiun	Chinese Taipei	21.85	
59	5	Arif Ahundov	Azerbaijan	22.08	
60	6	Mohammad Bin Haji	Brunei	22.37	
61	7	Kwame Galloway	Montserrat	22.45	
62	9	Khongdy Amnouayphone	Laos	22.86	
63	9	Mohd Mahbub Alam	Bangladesh	23.54	
	2	Christophe Cheval	France	DNS	
	7	Ivan Šlehobr	Czech Republic	DNS	

=== Quarterfinals ===
First 3 of each Heat (Q) and the next 4 fastest (q) qualified for the semifinals.

Rank	Heat	Name	Nationality	Time	Notes
1	2	Frankie Fredericks	Namibia	20.13	Q
2	3	Claudinei da Silva	Brazil	20.27	Q, PB
3	2	Ato Boldon	Trinidad and Tobago	20.28	Q
4	3	Kevin Little	United States	20.38	Q
5	4	Iván García	Cuba	20.48	Q
6	3	Sergey Osovich	Ukraine	20.54	Q, SB
7	3	Douglas Walker	Great Britain	20.56	q
8	3	Georgios Panagiotopoulos	Greece	20.57	q
9	2	Jon Drummond	United States	20.59	Q
10	4	Obadele Thompson	Barbados	20.62	Q
11	3	Deji Aliu	Nigeria	20.65	q
12	2	Julian Golding	Great Britain	20.69	q
13	2	Erik Wijmeersch	Belgium	20.73	
14	1	Patrick Stevens	Belgium	20.77	Q
14	3	Prodromos Katsantonis	Cyprus	20.77	
16	1	Troy Douglas	Bermuda	20.78	Q
16	2	O'Brian Gibbons	Canada	20.78	
18	2	Anninos Marcoullides	Cyprus	20.83	
18	3	Gary Ryan	Ireland	20.83	
20	4	Carlos Gats	Argentina	20.87	Q
21	4	Joseph Loua	Guinea	20.91	
22	4	Ioannis Nafpliotis	Greece	20.94	
23	4	Sebastián Keitel	Chile	20.96	
24	1	Chris Donaldson	New Zealand	21.04	Q
25	1	Gentry Bradley	United States	21.08	
26	2	Carlo Occhiena	Italy	21.14	
27	1	Sergejs Inšakovs	Latvia	21.22	
28	1	Emmanuel Tuffour	Ghana	21.25	
29	1	Sayon Cooper	Liberia	21.39	
30	1	Owusu Dako	Great Britain	21.52	
31	4	Giovanni Puggioni	Italy	22.77	
	4	Geir Moen	Norway	DNS	

=== Semifinals ===
First 4 of each Semifinal qualified directly (Q) for the final.

Rank	Heat	Name	Nationality	Time	Notes
1	2	Ato Boldon	Trinidad and Tobago	20.09	Q
2	2	Frankie Fredericks	Namibia	20.18	Q
3	2	Jon Drummond	United States	20.29	Q
4	1	Claudinei da Silva	Brazil	20.35	Q
5	1	Iván García	Cuba	20.39	Q
6	2	Patrick Stevens	Belgium	20.42	Q
7	1	Georgios Panagiotopoulos	Greece	20.43	Q, PB
7	2	Troy Douglas	Bermuda	20.43	SB
9	1	Obadele Thompson	Barbados	20.46	Q
10	1	Sergey Osovich	Ukraine	20.51	
11	1	Kevin Little	United States	20.57	
12	1	Julian Golding	Great Britain	20.61	
12	2	Douglas Walker	Great Britain	20.61	
14	2	Deji Aliu	Nigeria	20.78	
15	2	Chris Donaldson	New Zealand	20.92	
16	1	Carlos Gats	Argentina	21.44	

=== Final ===
Wind: 2.3 m/s

Rank	Lane	Name	Nationality	Time	Notes
1st place, gold medalist(s)	3	Ato Boldon	Trinidad and Tobago	20.03	
2nd place, silver medalist(s)	4	Frankie Fredericks	Namibia	20.23	
3rd place, bronze medalist(s)	5	Claudinei da Silva	Brazil	20.26	
4	6	Iván García	Cuba	20.31	
5	7	Georgios Panagiotopoulos	Greece	20.32	
6	2	Obadele Thompson	Barbados	20.37	
7	1	Jon Drummond	United States	20.44	
8	8	Patrick Stevens	Belgium	20.44	
