= 1992 World Junior Championships in Athletics – Men's 200 metres =

The men's 200 metres event at the 1992 World Junior Championships in Athletics was held in Seoul, South Korea, at Olympic Stadium on 18 and 19 September.

== Medalists ==
Gold	Ato Boldon; Trinidad and Tobago
Silver	Darren Campbell; United Kingdom
Bronze	Glen Elferink; South Africa

== Results ==
=== Final ===
19 September
Wind: +0.3 m/s

Rank	Name	Nationality	Time	Notes
1st place, gold medalist(s)	Ato Boldon	Trinidad and Tobago	20.63	
2nd place, silver medalist(s)	Darren Campbell	United Kingdom	20.87	
3rd place, bronze medalist(s)	Glen Elferink	South Africa	21.00	
4	Jamie Baulch	United Kingdom	21.04	
5	László Kiss	Hungary	21.05	
6	Kostás Kénteris	Greece	21.10	
7	Mark Keddell	New Zealand	21.19	
8	Yancey Hilliard	Germany	21.74	

=== Semifinals ===
18 September

==== Semifinal 1 ====
Wind: +0.9 m/s

Rank	Name	Nationality	Time	Notes
1	Ato Boldon	Trinidad and Tobago	20.71	Q
2	Jamie Baulch	United Kingdom	20.91	Q
3	Darryl Wohlsen	Australia	21.30	
4	Marlon Dechausey	Canada	21.46	
5	George Page	United States	21.47	
6	Keita Hiraga	Japan	21.64	
7	Todd Blythe	New Zealand	21.70	
	Sergey Osovich	Commonwealth of Independent States	DNS	

==== Semifinal 2 ====
Wind: +0.9 m/s

Rank	Name	Nationality	Time	Notes
1	László Kiss	Hungary	20.94	Q
2	Glen Elferink	South Africa	21.07	Q
3	Holger Blume	Germany	21.44	
4	Deji Aliu	Nigeria	21.44	
5	Sebastián Keitel	Chile	21.44	
6	Eric Frempong-Manso	Canada	21.47	
7	Juan Trull	Spain	21.56	
8	Ji Haisheng	China	21.84	

==== Semifinal 3 ====
Wind: -0.3 m/s

Rank	Name	Nationality	Time	Notes
1	Darren Campbell	United Kingdom	20.96	Q
2	Mark Keddell	New Zealand	21.10	Q
3	Kostás Kénteris	Greece	21.15	q
4	Yancey Hilliard	Germany	21.27	q
5	Markus Ineichen	Switzerland	21.55	
6	Paul Egonye	Nigeria	21.57	
7	Pierpaolo Cacciotti	Italy	21.82	
	Jordi Mayoral	Spain	DNF	

=== Heats ===
18 September

==== Heat 1 ====
Wind: +0.5 m/s

Rank	Name	Nationality	Time	Notes
1	Glen Elferink	South Africa	21.11	Q
2	Mark Keddell	New Zealand	21.12	Q
3	Jordi Mayoral	Spain	21.36	Q
4	Yancey Hilliard	Germany	21.52	Q
5	Antônio da Costa	Brazil	22.11	
6	Wendell Faria	Suriname	22.18	

==== Heat 2 ====
Wind: +0.4 m/s

Rank	Name	Nationality	Time	Notes
1	Ato Boldon	Trinidad and Tobago	20.91	Q
2	Jamie Baulch	United Kingdom	21.06	Q
3	Paul Egonye	Nigeria	21.41	Q
4	Marlon Dechausey	Canada	21.47	Q
5	Ji Haisheng	China	21.63	q
6	Jair Moreira	Brazil	21.77	
7	Alexis Recioy	Uruguay	22.31	

==== Heat 3 ====
Wind: +0.7 m/s

Rank	Name	Nationality	Time	Notes
1	George Page	United States	21.40	Q
2	Holger Blume	Germany	21.40	Q
3	Darryl Wohlsen	Australia	21.49	Q
4	Keita Hiraga	Japan	21.57	Q
5	Tomás Drímal	Czechoslovakia	21.87	
6	Ku Wai Ming	Hong Kong	22.31	
7	Thaniya Lopez	Barbados	22.35	
8	Abate Abayneh	Ethiopia	23.23	

==== Heat 4 ====
Wind: +0.2 m/s

Rank	Name	Nationality	Time	Notes
1	Darren Campbell	United Kingdom	20.89	Q
2	Kostás Kénteris	Greece	21.05	Q
3	Sergey Osovich	Commonwealth of Independent States	21.28	Q
4	Sebastián Keitel	Chile	21.38	Q
5	Deji Aliu	Nigeria	21.65	q
6	Todd Blythe	New Zealand	21.69	q
7	Pierpaolo Cacciotti	Italy	21.76	q
8	Luis Vega	Colombia	21.77	

==== Heat 5 ====
Wind: +0.7 m/s

Rank	Name	Nationality	Time	Notes
1	László Kiss	Hungary	21.11	Q
2	Juan Trull	Spain	21.43	Q
3	Eric Frempong-Manso	Canada	21.51	Q
4	Markus Ineichen	Switzerland	21.53	Q
5	Alejandro Cárdenas	Mexico	21.88	
6	Kent Dennie	Saint Vincent and the Grenadines	23.25	

== Participation ==
According to an unofficial count, 35 athletes from 28 countries participated in the event.

- Australia (1)
- Barbados (1)
- Brazil (2)
- Canada (2)
- Chile (1)
- China (1)
- Colombia (1)
- Commonwealth of Independent States (1)
- Czechoslovakia (1)
- Ethiopia (1)
- Germany (2)
- Greece (1)
- Hong Kong (1)
- Hungary (1)
- Italy (1)
- Japan (1)
- Mexico (1)
- New Zealand (2)
- Nigeria (2)
- Saint Vincent and the Grenadines (1)
- South Africa (1)
- Spain (2)
- Suriname (1)
- Switzerland (1)
- Trinidad and Tobago (1)
- United Kingdom (2)
- United States (1)
- Uruguay (1)
