= Keddell =

Keddell is a surname. Notable people with the surname include:

- Mark Keddell (born 1975), New Zealand sprinter
- Rose Keddell (born 1994), New Zealand field hockey player
