= Jeff Williams (sprinter) =

American sprinter (born 1965)

Personal information
- Full name: Jeffrey Williams
- Born: December 31, 1965 (age 60) Los Angeles, U.S.
Medal record
Men's athletics
Representing the United States
Pan American Games
Bronze medal – third place	1991 Havana	100 m
World Championships
Bronze medal – third place	1995 Gothenburg	200 m

Jeffrey "Jeff" Williams (born December 31, 1965) is an American former track and field athlete who specialized in the 200-meter dash. He was the bronze medalist at the 1995 World Championships in Athletics and reached the 200 m final at the 1996 Summer Olympics. He set an American record in the 200 m indoors in 1996.

He was a late bloomer and attended his first world championship competition at the age of 29. Williams was unusual for an elite male runner at the time in that he had a female coach: 1968 Olympic gold medallist Barbara Ferrell.

== Career ==
=== College ===
Born in Los Angeles, California, Williams attended Washington Preparatory High School and graduated from Los Angeles City College in 1985. He joined Prairie View A&M University and began playing football for the Prairie View A&M Panthers. The team coach noticed his speed and asked if Williams would join the track team. He recorded bests of 10.3 seconds in the 100 meters and a wind-assisted 20.85 seconds in the 200 m during his time at Prairie View and was sixth in the heats of the 200 m of the NCAA Men's Outdoor Track and Field Championship.

=== Professional career ===
After graduating in 1987 with a degree in social sciences he was unusual for a track athlete in that he supported himself without help from a sponsorship deal. He began making regular appearances at the USA Outdoor Track and Field Championships: in 1989 he reached the 100 m semi-finals and the 200 m finals and improved the following year to finish seventh in the 100 m and sixth in the 200 m. Williams gained international experience at the 1991 Pan American Games where he took 100 m bronze behind compatriot Andre Cason, although he was disqualified with the US 4×100-meter relay team. He also ran on the European circuit that year and was selected for the 200 m at the 1991 IAAF Grand Prix Final, where he finished fifth.

Following advice from his father, Williams decided to take track seriously from 1992 onwards and he began working with 1968 Olympic silver medallist Barbara Ferrell – it was highly unusual for a woman to coach an elite male runner, but Williams was unperturbed, saying: "I've heard people say a woman can't coach a man, but they must be lying, because look what she has done for me". He made his first attempt to qualify at the United States Olympic Trials in 1992, but he was sixth in the 100 m semi-finals and finished last in the 200 m. Despite this, he was selected for the IAAF World Cup in Athletics and won the bronze in the 200 m and helped the US relay team to a gold medal. His performance at the 1993 US Championships was poor, but he countered this with success in Europe, winning the 200 m at the British AAA Championships, and doubling up at the 1993 IAAF Grand Prix Final with a fourth in the 100 and fifth in the 200 m. His 1994 season was a quiet one, although he was sixth in the 200 m at the US Championships and he ran a personal best of 20.19 seconds in Stockholm (the fifth fastest time of the year).

=== World and Olympic finals ===
The 1995 season was a breakthrough for Williams. He managed to reach the 100 m US final, but it was in the 200 m that he finally reached the national podium, taking the bronze behind Michael Johnson and Kevin Little. Reflecting on his performance at his seventh consecutive national championships, he said "I think persistence plays a little part in it. Luck is remnant of desire. Just hanging in there". After making appearances at European meets, he prepared for the 200 m at the 1995 World Championships in Athletics. After winning his heat and quarter-final races, he stepped up his performance to run 20.32 seconds for second place in the semi-finals behind Frankie Fredericks. In the final he ran a personal record time of 20.18 seconds and was rewarded with the bronze medal, having finished behind Fredericks and Johnson. Williams had won his first world medal at a major championships at the age of 29. He closed the season with a fifth place at the IAAF Grand Prix Final.

Williams hit his athletic peak in 1996, beginning with an American indoor record of 20.40 seconds over 200 m in the early stages of the season, which was the third fastest indoor time that year. He finished as runner-up in the event behind Kevin Little at the USA Indoor Track and Field Championships. While competing at the Fresno Relays in California, Williams' 100 m race was spoiled when his shoe came off. Keen to check his competitive level, Williams opted to run an impromptu 200 m at the meet instead. He clocked a personal record time of 19.87 seconds into a headwind, a time that only Michael Johnson and Frankie Fredericks had beaten since 1992.

By the time of the 1996 US Olympic Trials, he had also run a 100-meter dash best of 10.14 seconds. He scored another personal record in the first round, running 10.02 seconds, and progressed to the final with similar marks. After a false start in the 100 m final, he finished fourth and just off the qualifying position for the Olympics. This was his best ever 100 m placing, but he was disappointed with his performance: "I had a mental breakdown and got called for a false start. I blew it". He fared better in the 200 m and came second with a time of 20.03 seconds, although he was some distance off the winner, Michael Johnson, who ran a world record time of 19.66 seconds.

Running at his first Olympics at the age of 30, he easily qualified through the early stages and was third in his semi-final. When it came to the final Williams, ran a time of 20.17 seconds, which would have been enough to medal at the previous Olympics. However, the 1996 Olympic 200 meter race was one of the fastest ever as Michael Johnson knocked a third of a second off the world record, Frankie Fredericks ran the third fastest time ever, and Ato Boldon finished in 19.80 seconds. Williams had to settle for fifth (behind Obadele Thompson) in his final appearance on the global stage.

Although retired from the elite scene, Williams still competes in masters athletics competitions, running in the M40 class.

== Personal bests ==
Event	Time (sec)	Venue	Date
50 metres	5.78	?	1992
60 metres	6.67	?	1995
100 metres	10.02	Atlanta, United States	June 14, 1996
200 metres	19.87	Fresno, California, United States	April 13, 1996
200 metres (indoor)	20.40	?	1996

- All information taken from IAAF/USATF profiles.

== Competition record ==
Year	Competition	Venue	Position	Event
1991	Pan American Games	Havana, Cuba	3rd	100 m
1991	Pan American Games	Havana, Cuba	DQ	4×100-meter relay
1991	IAAF Grand Prix Final	Barcelona, Spain	5th	200 m
1992	IAAF World Cup	Havana, Cuba	3rd	200 m
1992	IAAF World Cup	Havana, Cuba	1st	4×100-meter relay
1993	IAAF Grand Prix Final	London, United Kingdom	4th	100 m
1993	IAAF Grand Prix Final	London, United Kingdom	5th	200 m
1995	World Championships	Gothenburg, Sweden	3rd	200 m
1995	IAAF Grand Prix Final	Monte Carlo, Monaco	5th	200 m
1996	Olympic Games	Atlanta, Georgia	5th	200 m
