= Athletics at the 1999 Pan American Games – Men's 200 metres =

Men's 200 metres at the Pan American Games

The men's 200 metres event at the 1999 Pan American Games was held July 27–28.

== Medalists ==
Gold	Silver	Bronze
Claudinei da Silva; Brazil	Curtis Perry; United States	Sebastián Keitel; Chile

== Results ==
=== Heats ===
Qualification: First 3 of each heat (Q) and the next 2 fastest (q) qualified for the final.

Wind:
Heat 1: +2.2 m/s, Heat 2: +3.4 m/s

Rank	Heat	Name	Nationality	Time	Notes
1	2	Claudinei Silva	Brazil	20.14	Q
2	2	Sebastián Keitel	Chile	20.44	Q
3	1	Curtis Perry	United States	20.50	Q
4	2	Iván García	Cuba	20.54	Q
5	2	Christopher Williams	Jamaica	20.68	q
6	2	Juan Pedro Toledo	Mexico	20.80	q
7	1	Édson Ribeiro	Brazil	20.84	Q
8	1	Heber Viera	Uruguay	21.07	Q
9	2	Nathanaël Esprit	Netherlands Antilles	21.09	
10	2	Francisco Cornelio	Dominican Republic	21.14	
11	1	Dominic Demeritte	Bahamas	21.16	
12	1	Joel Mascoll	Saint Vincent and the Grenadines	21.25	
13	1	Jacey Harper	Trinidad and Tobago	21.27	
14	1	Carlos Gats	Argentina	21.29	
15	1	Sherwin James	Dominica	21.85	
	2	Kenny Brokenburr	United States	DNS	

=== Final ===
Wind: -1.9 m/s

Rank	Name	Nationality	Time	Notes
1st place, gold medalist(s)	Claudinei Silva	Brazil	20.30	
2nd place, silver medalist(s)	Curtis Perry	United States	20.58	
3rd place, bronze medalist(s)	Sebastián Keitel	Chile	20.82	
4	Iván García	Cuba	20.85	
5	Juan Pedro Toledo	Mexico	21.05	
6	Édson Ribeiro	Brazil	21.09	
7	Christopher Williams	Jamaica	21.19	
8	Heber Viera	Uruguay	21.19	
