= Athletics at the 1995 Pan American Games – Men's 4 × 100 metres relay =

Men's 4 × 100 metres relay at the Pan American Games

The men's 4 × 100 metres relay event at the 1995 Pan American Games was held at the Estadio Atletico "Justo Roman" on 25 March.

== Results ==
Rank	Nation	Athletes	Time	Notes
1st place, gold medalist(s)	Cuba	Joel Isasi, Joel Lamela, Iván García, Jorge Aguilera	38.67	
2nd place, silver medalist(s)	United States	Dino Napier, Ron Clark, Robert Reading, Wendell Gaskin	39.12	
3rd place, bronze medalist(s)	Mexico	Jaime Barragán, Alejandro Cárdenas, Carlos Villaseñor, Salvador Miranda	39.77	
4	Jamaica	Wayne Robinson, Windell Dobson, Carl McPherson, Rohan McDonald	39.79	
5	Bahamas	Jerome Williams, Andrew Tynes, Ali Stubbs, Iram Lewis	39.83	
6	Argentina	Jorge Polanco, Cristian Vitasse, Guillermo Cacián, Carlos Gats	39.44	
7	Brazil	Walmes de Souza, Marcelo Brivilatti da Silva, André Domingos, Robson da Silva	40.07	
8	Saint Kitts and Nevis	Warren Thompson, Kurvin Wallace, Vance Clarke, Kim Collins	41.72	
