= Athletics at the 1995 Pan American Games – Men's 200 metres =

Men's 200 metres at the Pan American Games

The men's 200 metres event at the 1995 Pan American Games was held at the Estadio Atletico "Justo Roman" on 21 and 22 March.

== Medalists ==
Gold	Silver	Bronze
Iván García; Cuba	Andrew Tynes; Bahamas	Sebastián Keitel; Chile

== Results ==
=== Heats ===
Wind:
Heat 1: +2.1 m/s, Heat 2: +2.6 m/s, Heat 3: +1.5 m/s, Heat 4: +1.3 m/s

Rank	Heat	Name	Nationality	Time	Notes
1	2	Andrew Tynes	Bahamas	20.48	Q
2	4	Iván García	Cuba	20.50	Q
3	3	Sebastián Keitel	Chile	20.53	Q
4	2	Marcelo Brivilati da Silva	Brazil	20.60	Q
5	3	Bryan Bridgewater	United States	20.67	Q
6	3	Leonardo Prevost	Cuba	20.77	Q
7	1	Robson da Silva	Brazil	20.80	Q
7	3	Robert Guy	Trinidad and Tobago	20.80	Q
9	1	Clive Wright	Jamaica	20.86	Q
9	4	Carlos Gats	Argentina	20.86	Q
11	1	Ron Clark	United States	20.88	Q
12	4	Glenroy Gilbert	Canada	20.89	Q
13	1	O'Brian Gibbons	Canada	20.90	Q
14	2	Neil De Silva	Trinidad and Tobago	21.03	Q
15	4	Iram Lewis	Bahamas	21.04	Q
16	1	Keith Smith	United States Virgin Islands	21.16	
16	4	Eswort Coombs	Saint Vincent and the Grenadines	21.16	
18	1	Edsel Chase	Barbados	21.29	
19	4	Kurvin Wallace	Saint Kitts and Nevis	21.40	
20	3	Cristian Vitasse	Argentina	21.43	
21	4	Roger Jordan	Barbados	21.46	
22	3	Derry Pemberton	United States Virgin Islands	21.51	
23	2	Windell Dobson	Jamaica	22.63	Q
	2	Warren Thompson	Saint Kitts and Nevis	DQ	
	2	Wenceslao Ferrín	Colombia	DNS	

=== Semifinals ===
Wind:
Heat 1: +1.0 m/s, Heat 2: +1.2 m/s

Rank	Heat	Name	Nationality	Time	Notes
1	1	Iván García	Cuba	20.17	Q, PB
2	2	Andrew Tynes	Bahamas	20.23	Q
3	2	Bryan Bridgewater	United States	20.37	Q
4	1	Sebastián Keitel	Chile	20.38	Q
5	2	Robson da Silva	Brazil	20.40	Q
6	1	Marcelo Brivilati da Silva	Brazil	20.58	Q, PB
7	1	Ron Clark	United States	20.63	Q
8	2	Carlos Gats	Argentina	20.82	Q
9	2	O'Brian Gibbons	Canada	20.90	
10	2	Leonardo Prevost	Cuba	20.91	
11	1	Robert Guy	Trinidad and Tobago	20.95	
12	2	Neil De Silva	Trinidad and Tobago	20.98	
13	1	Iram Lewis	Bahamas	21.01	
14	2	Windell Dobson	Jamaica	21.14	
	1	Clive Wright	Jamaica	DNF	
	1	Glenroy Gilbert	Canada	DNS	

=== Final ===
Wind: +1.1 m/s

Rank	Name	Nationality	Time	Notes
1st place, gold medalist(s)	Iván García	Cuba	20.29	
2nd place, silver medalist(s)	Andrew Tynes	Bahamas	20.33	
3rd place, bronze medalist(s)	Sebastián Keitel	Chile	20.55	
4	Robson da Silva	Brazil	20.60	
5	Marcelo Brivilati da Silva	Brazil	20.78	
6	Ron Clark	United States	20.84	
7	Carlos Gats	Argentina	20.86	
8	Brian Bridgewater	United States	21.22	
