= Robert Reading (athlete) =

American sprinter

Personal information
- Born: June 9, 1967 (age 59)
- Education: Saint Mary's College High School; University of Southern California
- Height: 6 ft 4 in (193 cm)
- Weight: 195 lb (88 kg)

Sport
- Sport: Athletics
- Event: Sprinting
Medal record
Representing United States
Men's athletics
Pan American Games
Silver medal – second place	1995 Mar del Plata	4×100 m relay

Robert Reading (born June 9, 1967) is an American former athlete who competed in sprinting events.

Reading attended Saint Mary's College High School in Berkeley, California.

A USC Trojans varsity athlete, Reading was the 1989 NCAA Division I Outdoor champion in 110 meters hurdles, running a wind-assisted 13.19 in the final, having earlier broken Earl McCullouch's 22-year-old school record with 13.42 during the heats. He represented the United States at the 1995 Pan American Games and was part of the silver medal-winning 4 × 100 m relay team, with Ron Clark, Wendell Gaskin and Dino Napier.
