= Sergejs Inšakovs =

Latvian sprinter (born 1971)

Personal information
- Born: 27 December 1971 (age 54) Tula, Soviet Union
- Height: 1.78 m (5 ft 10 in)
- Weight: 63 kg (139 lb)

Sport
- Sport: Track and field
- Events: 100 m, 200 m
- Club: Luzda

Sergejs Inšakovs (born 27 December 1971 in Tula) is a retired Latvian athlete who competed in sprinting events. He represented his country at the 1996 Summer Olympics, as well as the 1995 and 1997 World Championships.

== Competition record ==
Year	Competition	Venue	Position	Event	Notes
Representing the Soviet Union
1990	World Junior Championships	Plovdiv, Bulgaria	2nd	4 × 100 m relay	39.58
Representing Latvia
1993	Universiade	Buffalo, United States	7th	200 m	20.97 (w)
1995	World Championships	Gothenburg, Sweden	20th (qf)	200 m	20.73
1996	European Indoor Championships	Stockholm, Sweden	22nd (h)	60 m	6.82
1996	European Indoor Championships	Stockholm, Sweden	–	200 m	DQ
1996	Olympic Games	Atlanta, United States	44th (h)	100 m	20.48
1996	Olympic Games	Atlanta, United States	11th (sf)	200 m	20.48
1997	World Championships	Athens, Greece	31st (qf)	100 m	10.34
1997	World Championships	Athens, Greece	27th (qf)	200 m	21.22
1997	World Championships	Athens, Greece	12th (h)	4 × 400 m relay	3:04.30
1998	European Indoor Championships	Valencia, Spain	20th (h)	200 m	21.41
2002	European Indoor Championships	Vienna, Austria	30th (h)	60 m	6.88
2002	European Indoor Championships	Vienna, Austria	28th (h)	200 m	21.70
2002	European Championships	Munich, Germany	39th (h)	100 m	10.62
2002	European Championships	Munich, Germany	27th (h)	200 m	21.20

== Personal bests ==
Outdoor

- 100 metres – 10.28 (+0.6 m/s) (Athens 1997)
- 200 metres – 20.41 (+1.3 m/s) (Atlanta 1996) NR

Indoor

- 60 metres – 6.77 (Riga 2002)
- 200 metres – 21.26 (Mälmo 1998) NR
