= Curtis Perry (sprinter) =

American sprinter (born 1974)

Personal information
- Born: 26 October 1974 (age 51)

Sport
- Sport: Track and field
- Club: LSU Tigers
Medal record
Representing United States
Pan American Games
Silver medal – second place	1999 Winnipeg	200m

Curtis Perry (born 26 October 1974) is a retired American sprinter who specialized in the 200 metres.

He competed at the 1999 World Championships, but only reached the quarter-final. At the 1999 Pan American Games he won the silver medal in the 200 metres and finished fourth in the 4 × 100 metres relay. In relay he also finished second at the 1998 IAAF World Cup.

Collegiately he competed for the LSU Tigers, winning the NCAA Division I-Championship title in 1998.

His personal best time was 20.25 seconds, achieved in April 1997 in El Paso.
