= Takahiro Mazuka =

Japanese sprinter

Personal information
- Nationality: Japanese
- Born: 29 June 1976 (age 50)

Sport
- Sport: Sprinting
- Event: 200 metres

Takahiro Mazuka (馬塚 貴弘, Mazuka Takahiro; born 29 June 1976) is a Japanese sprinter. He competed in the men's 200 metres at the 1996 Summer Olympics.
