= 1998 Ibero-American Championships in Athletics =

VIII Ibero-American Championships
- Official logo
- Dates: 17 – 19 July
- Host city: Lisbon, Portugal
- Venue: Estádio Universitário de Lisboa
- Events: 43
- Participation: 327 athletes from 22 nations
- Records set: 9 championship records

The 1998 Ibero-American Championships in Athletics (Spanish: VIII Campeonato Iberoamericano de Atletismo) was the eighth edition of the international athletics competition between Ibero-American nations which was held at the Estádio Universitário de Lisboa in Lisbon, Portugal from 17–19 July.

As had previously occurred at the 1992 edition, the competition coincided with a world's fair, being held as part of Lisbon's Expo '98 event. The Spanish team topped the medal table with sixteen gold medals and 37 medals in total. Mexico won the next highest number of golds, taking seven in a haul of 16 medals, while the hosts Portugal had the second highest medal tally, having secured 21 medals in the three-day competition. Cuba sent a small delegation due to economic constraints and many of its foremost athletes were absent. In spite of this five Cubans topped the podium, leaving them fourth in the rankings.

Mexico's Ana Guevara won her first international medals in Lisbon, taking 400 m individual and relay titles as well as a silver medal in the 800 metres. Twenty-year-old Yago Lamela also won his first international long jump medal and later went on to win medals on the world stage. The 1997 London Marathon champion António Pinto won the 5000 metres gold for the hosts with a championship record time of 13:34.34 minutes. Chilean Sebastián Keitel continued his success at the competition by repeating his 100/200 metres double of the 1996 edition.

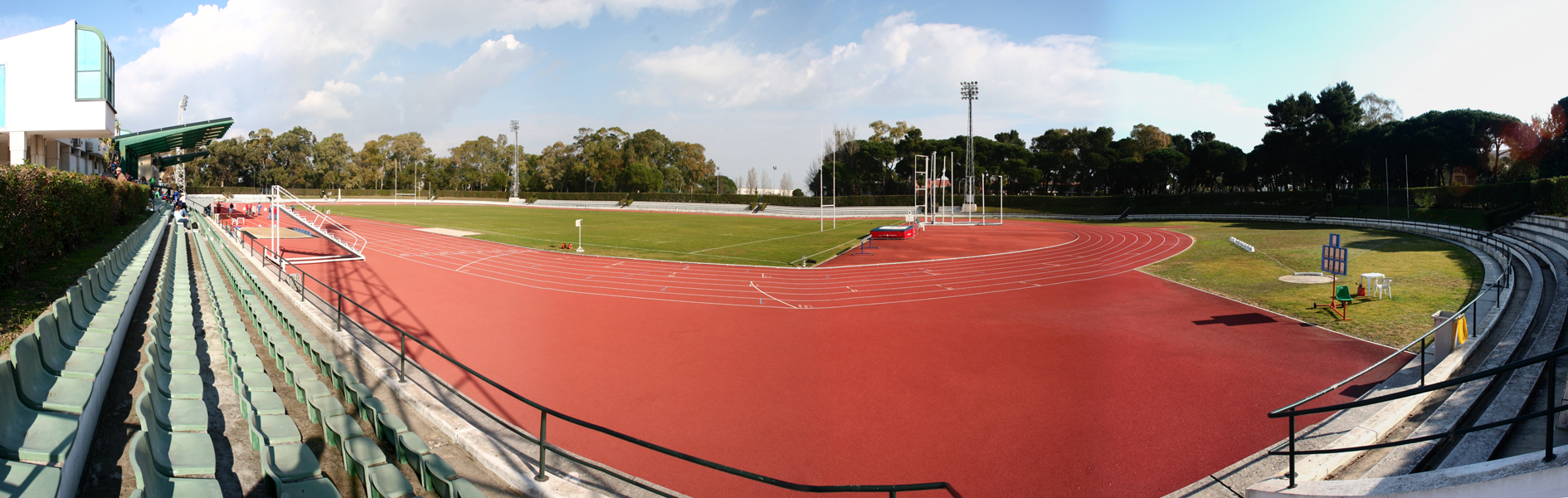
The host stadium (shown in 2012)

Although the overall standard of the competition was not as high as other years, nine championships records were improved at the event. Liliana Allen, formerly of Cuba, won the women's 100 m gold in a record of 11.32 seconds. Alberto Sánchez bettered the men's hammer throw mark, while María Eugenia Villamizar won her third straight women's hammer title with another championships record. Dana Cervantes and Alejandra García established a new record in the women's pole vault, a contest whose introduction brought the 43-event programme to near parity for the sexes (the men's steeplechase being the sole remaining difference). National records were also set in Lisbon: Lisette Rondón beat the Chilean 100 m record, Sebastian Keitel's winning time of 10.10 seconds was also a new Chilean mark, while 100 m and 200 m medalist Carlos Gats set Argentine records in both disciplines.

== Medal summary ==
=== Men ===
Event	Gold		Silver		Bronze	
100 metres	Sebastián Keitel (CHI)	10.10 NR	Édson Ribeiro (BRA)	10.14	Carlos Gats (ARG)	10.23 NR
200 metres	Sebastián Keitel (CHI)	20.16	Carlos Gats (ARG)	20.37 NR	Édson Ribeiro (BRA)	20.58
400 metres	Alejandro Cárdenas (MEX)	45.04	Juan Pedro Toledo (MEX)	45.63	David Canal (ESP)	45.87
800 metres	Flavio Godoy (BRA)	1:50.05	Roberto Parra (ESP)	1:50.19	Duarte Ponte (POR)	1:50.60
1500 metres^{‡}	Luís Feiteira (POR)	3:40.63 CR	Pedro Esteso (ESP)	3:40.64	Hudson de Souza (BRA)	3:41.14
5000 metres	António Pinto (POR)	13:34.34 CR	Pablo Olmedo (MEX)	13:35.21	Eduardo Henriques (POR)	13:51.66
10,000 metres	Antonio Silio (ARG)	28:25.30	Paulo Guerra (POR)	28:40.18	Alberto Maravilha (POR)	28:58.11
110 metres hurdles	Erik Batte (CUB)	13.54	Francisco Javier López (ESP)	13.95	Hipólito Montesinos (ESP)	13.97
400 metres hurdles	Eronilde de Araújo (BRA)	48.96 CR	Carlos Silva (POR)	49.08	Emilio Valle (CUB)	50.08
3000 metres steeplechase	Luis Miguel Martín (ESP)	8:28.96	Vítor Almeida (POR)	8:29.48	Néstor Nieves (VEN)	8:30.07
4×100 metres relay	Brazil (BRA); Arnaldo da Silva; Claudio Roberto Silva; Édson Ribeiro; Robson da Silva	39.82	Mexico (MEX); Carlos Villaseñor; Juan Pedro Toledo; César López; Evener Dueñas	40.49	Only two finishing teams^{†}	
4×400 metres relay	Mexico (MEX); Raymundo Escalante; Juan Pedro Toledo; Oscar Juanz; Alejandro Cárdenas	3:06.12	Spain (ESP); Adrián Fernández; Antonio Andrés; Iñigo Monreal; David Canal	3:08.05	Portugal (POR); Rui Costa; Duarte Ponte; Paulo Fontes; Vitor Jorge	3:08.46
20 km walk	Alejandro López (MEX)	1:25:18	Julio Martínez (GUA)	1:26:25	Héctor Moreno (COL)	1:27:21
High jump	Ignacio Pérez (ESP)	2.20 m	Javier Bermejo (ESP)	2.20 m	Gilmar Mayo (COL)	2.18 m
Pole vault	Montxu Miranda (ESP)	5.60 m CR	Nuno Fernandes (POR)	5.55 m	Javier García (ESP)	5.40 m
Long jump	Yago Lamela (ESP)	8.12 m	Raúl Fernández (ESP)	8.05 m	Lewis Asprilla (COL)	7.88 m
Triple jump	Iván Salcedo (MEX)	16.36 m	Raúl Chapado (ESP)	16.16 m	Antônio da Costa (BRA)	16.09 m
Shot put	Manuel Martínez Gutiérrez (ESP)	19.47 m	Fernando Alves (POR)	19.13 m	José Luis Martínez (ESP)	18.56 m
Discus throw	Alexis Elizalde (CUB)	61.45 m	Paulo Bernardo (POR)	60.19 m	Marcelo Pugliese (ARG)	58.19 m
Hammer throw	Alberto Sánchez (CUB)	76.18 m CR	Vítor Costa (POR)	71.17 m	Juan Cerra (ARG)	70.83 m
Javelin throw	Isbel Luaces (CUB)	78.72 m	Nery Kennedy (PAR)	76.16 m	Rodrigo Zelaya (CHI)	74.54 m
Decathlon	Rubén Delgado (ESP)	7295 pts	Santiago Lorenzo (ARG)	7177 pts	José de Assis (BRA)	7113 pts

- ^{†} Note: a Spanish team and a Portuguese team entered the 4×100 metres relay race, but both were disqualified.
- ^{‡} Note: the official medal count has Mexico's Héctor Torres as the joint 800 m bronze medallist. Although, he and Hudson de Souza both had finishing times of 3:41.14 minutes, the official results list Torres as coming in fourth place in the race.

=== Women ===
Event	Gold		Silver		Bronze	
100 metres	Liliana Allen (MEX)	11.32 CR	Lucrécia Jardim (POR)	11.38	Kátia de Jesus Santos (BRA)	11.62
200 metres	Lucrécia Jardim (POR)	23.22	Liliana Allen (MEX)	23.29	Julia Duporty (CUB)	23.52
400 metres	Ana Guevara (MEX)	50.65	Norfalia Carabalí (COL)	51.95	Yudalis Díaz (CUB)	52.49
800 metres	Ana Amelia Menéndez (ESP)	2:01.32	Ana Guevara (MEX)	2:01.55	Pilar Barreiro (ESP)	2:03.12
1500 metres	Carla Sacramento (POR)	4:17.43	Nuria Fernández (ESP)	4:20.20	Janeth Caizalitín (ECU)	4:20.38
5000 metres	Estíbaliz Urrutia (ESP)	16:09.68 CR	Nora Rocha (MEX)	16:10.36	Amaia Piedra (ESP)	16:12.09
10,000 metres	María Luisa Larraga (ESP)	32:49.80	Helena Sampaio (POR)	33:07.80	Manuela Machado (POR)	33:14.60
100 metres hurdles (Wind: 2.0 m/s)	María José Mardomingo (ESP)	13.27	Verónica Depaoli (ARG)	13.46	Jacqueline Taváres (MEX)	13.56
400 metres hurdles	Eva Paniagua (ESP)	57.35	Esther Lahoz (ESP)	57.40	Flor Robledo (COL)	58.22
4×100 metres relay	Spain (ESP); Carmen Blay; Elena Córcoles; Arantxa Iglesias; Susana Martín	44.54	Portugal (POR); Maria Carmo Tavares; Natalia Moura; Lucrecia Jardim; Severina Cravid	44.75	Only two finishing teams^{†}	
4×400 metres relay	Mexico (MEX); María Angeles Pantoja; Marcela Sarabia; Mayra González; Ana Guevara	3:33.41	Colombia (COL); Flor Robledo; Ximena Restrepo; Patrícia Rodríguez; Norfalia Carabalí	3:33.69	Spain (ESP); Esther Lahoz; Yolanda Reyes; Lisette Ferri; Miriam Bravo	3:33.97
10,000 m track walk	Eva Pérez (ESP)	47:14.49	Geovana Irusta (BOL)	47:20.26	Rosario Sánchez (MEX)	47:36.10
High jump	María del Mar Martínez (ESP)	1.83 m	Solange Witteveen (ARG)	1.83 m	Marta Mendía (ESP)	1.81 m
Pole vault	Dana Cervantes (ESP)	3.95 m CR	Alejandra García (ARG)	3.95 m CR	Déborah Gyurcsek (URU)	3.55 m
Long jump	Andrea Ávila (ARG)	6.41 m	Maria de Souza (BRA)	6.28 m	Maurren Maggi (BRA)	6.25 m
Triple jump	Yamilé Aldama (CUB)	14.07 m	Carlota Castrejana (ESP)	13.58 m	Maria de Souza (BRA)	13.44 m
Shot put	Elisângela Adriano (BRA)	18.38 m	Margarita Ramos (ESP)	17.47 m	Teresa Machado (POR)	16.15 m
Discus throw	Teresa Machado (POR)	61.67 m	Elisângela Adriano (BRA)	58.94 m	Rita Lora (ESP)	56.92 m
Hammer throw	María Eugenia Villamizar (COL)	59.22 m CR	Yipsi Moreno (CUB)	57.97 m	Violeta Guzmán (MEX)	56.92 m
Javelin throw (Old javelin model)	Sabina Moya (COL)	58.65 m	Zuleima Araméndiz (COL)	57.57 m	Idoia Mariezkurrena (ESP)	52.05 m
Heptathlon	Inma Clopés (ESP)	5799 pts	Euzinete dos Reis (BRA)	5640 pts	Zorobabelia Córdoba (COL)	5551 pts

- ^{†} Note: a Colombian team entered the 4×100 metres relay, but was disqualified.

== Medal table ==
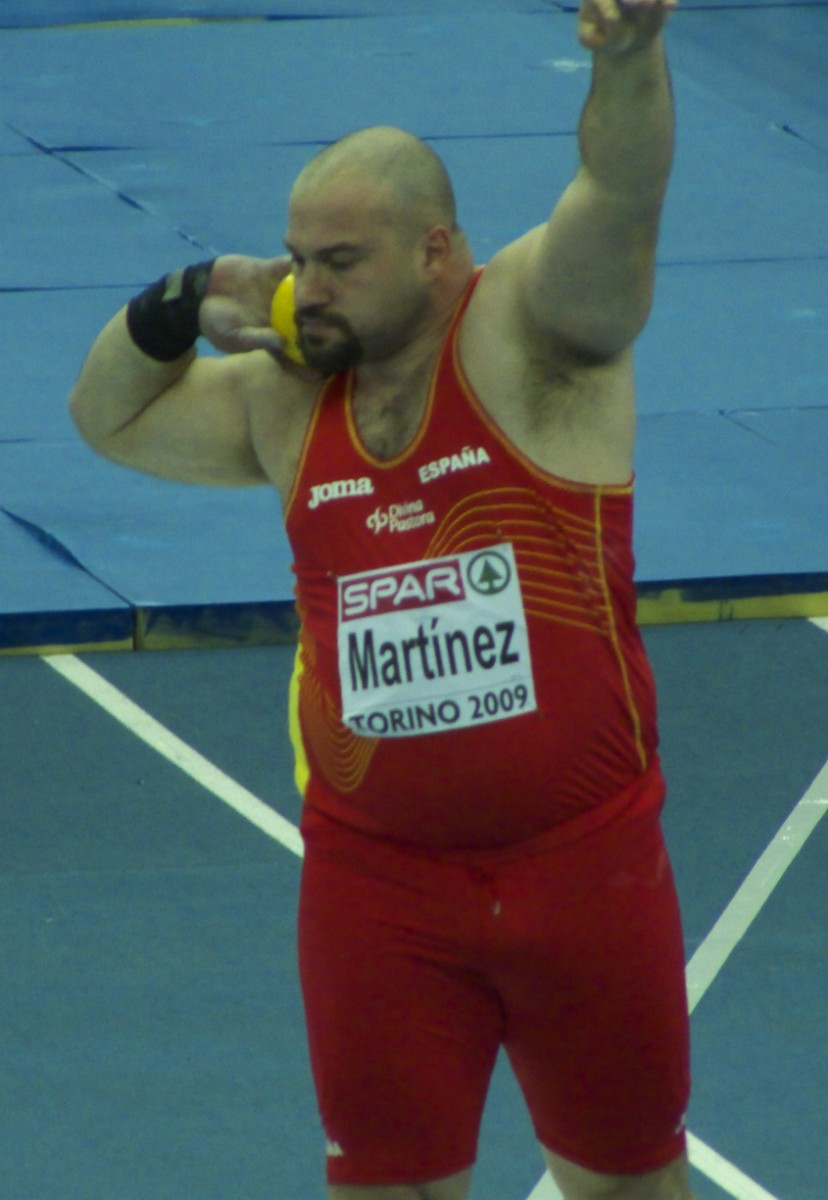
Shot put winner Manuel Martínez Gutiérrez helped Spain top the table.

* Host nation (Portugal)

Rank	Nation	Gold	Silver	Bronze	Total
1	Spain	16	11	10	37
2	Mexico	7	6	3	16
3	Portugal*	5	10	6	21
4	Cuba	5	1	3	9
5	Brazil	4	4	7	15
6	Argentina	2	5	3	10
7	Colombia	2	3	5	10
8	Chile	2	0	1	3
9	Bolivia	0	1	0	1
9	Guatemala	0	1	0	1
9	Paraguay	0	1	0	1
12	Ecuador	0	0	1	1
12	Uruguay	0	0	1	1
12	Venezuela	0	0	1	1
Totals (14 entries)		43	43	41	127

- ^{†}Note: The medal count from the 2010 Ibero-American Championships report is incorrect as it gives Mexico four bronze medals instead of three – Héctor Torres had the same finishing time as the 1500 m bronze medallist Hudson de Souza, but is noted as having finished in fourth place.

== Participation ==
Four new members of the Asociación Iberoamericana de Atletismo competed at the championships for the first time: Cape Verde, Guinea-Bissau, Mozambique and São Tomé and Príncipe. This meant that 21 of the 28 members at that time sent delegations to the championships, which was the second highest number after the 1992 edition. A total of 327 athletes competed at the 1998 edition of the championships.

The absence of Costa Rica, Dominican Republic, Honduras, Nicaragua and Panama significantly reduced the participation of Central American and Caribbean athletes.

- Angola (1)
- Argentina (19)
- Bolivia (1)
- Brazil (29)
- Cape Verde (4)
- Chile (14)
- Colombia (27)
- Cuba (18)
- Ecuador (2)
- Guatemala (4)
- Guinea-Bissau (4)
- Mexico (32)
- Mozambique (4)
- Paraguay (2)
- Peru (2)
- Portugal (73)
- Puerto Rico (2)
- El Salvador (4)
- São Tomé and Príncipe (2)
- Spain (67)
- Uruguay (2)
- Venezuela (14)
