= Sebastián Keitel =

Chilean politician and former sprinter (born 1973)

- Official portrait, 2026

Member of the Senate
- Incumbent
- Assumed office 11 March 2022
- Constituency: 10th circumscription

Member of the Chamber of Deputies
- In office 11 March 2018 – 11 March 2022
- Constituency: District 10

Personal details
- Born: 14 February 1973 (age 53) Santiago, Chile
- Party: Evópoli

Medal record

Men's track and field

Representing Chile

World Indoor Championships
Bronze medal – third place	1995 Barcelona	200m

Pan American Games
Bronze medal – third place	1995 Mar del Plata	200 m
Bronze medal – third place	1999 Winnipeg	200 m

South American Games
Gold medal – first place	1994 Valencia	200 m
Silver medal – second place	1994 Valencia	400 m

Sebastián Keitel Bianchi (born 14 February 1973) is a Chilean politician and former sprinter who serves as senator of the Biobío Region since March 2022. He competed mostly in the 200 metres and was coached by renowned Chilean coach Pedro Soto Acuña.

From 2018 to 2022, he served as deputy of the district 10 of the Santiago Metropolitan Region.

== Biography ==
Sebastián Keitel comes from an athletics family, his grandfather, Alberto Keitel was a sprinter in the 1930s, as was his father, Alberto Keitel Jr., in the 1960s. His grandmother, María Cristina Böcke, was the South American discus throw champion in 1939.

He has been successful at the regional level, and won a bronze medal at the 1995 World Indoor Championships. He currently holds the national records of Chile in the 100 metres (10.10 s) and the 200 metres (20.15 s). At his prime, he was regarded as the fastest white man in the world in the 200 metres.

== Political career ==
After his retirement, Keitel was a candidate to councillor for Santiago commune in 2012.

Later, Keitel announced that he would run as a candidate for the Chamber of Deputies of Chile for the 2017 Chilean general election, as an independent affiliated with Political Evolution.

== TV career ==
In 2012 and 2013, Keitel served as host and trainer for the Chilean reality show Mundos Opuestos (Opposite Worlds) from Canal 13.

In 2013, Keitel served as a judge for the Chilean talent show Salta Si Puedes (Jump If You Can) from Chilevisión.

== Personal life ==
He was married to former Chilean sprinter, Lisette Rondón. Their son, Sebastián, is also a promising athlete.

Keitel, a practicing Roman Catholic, has German, Italian, Swedish and Danish ancestry.

== International competitions ==
Year	Competition	Venue	Position	Event	Notes
Representing Chile
1991	South American Junior Championships	Asunción, Paraguay	4th	200 m	22.6
1991	South American Junior Championships	Asunción, Paraguay	2nd	400 m	48.8
1991	South American Junior Championships	Asunción, Paraguay	3rd	4 × 400 m relay	3:27.4
1991	South American Championships	Manaus, Brazil	6th	400 m	48.37
1991	South American Championships	Manaus, Brazil	5th	4 × 400 m relay	3:14.41
1992	South American Junior Championships	Lima, Peru	1st	200 m	21.5
1992	South American Junior Championships	Lima, Peru	2nd	400 m	48.4
1992	World Junior Championships	Seoul, South Korea	12th (sf)	200 m	21.44
1993	South American Championships	Lima, Peru	5th	100 m	10.95
1993	South American Championships	Lima, Peru	5th	200 m	21.4
1993	South American Championships	Lima, Peru	1st	4 × 100 m relay	40.20
1993	South American Championships	Lima, Peru	3rd	4 × 400 m relay	3:09.5
1994	Ibero-American Championships	Mar del Plata, Argentina	1st	200 m	20.43
1994	Ibero-American Championships	Mar del Plata, Argentina	1st	400 m	46.72
1994	Ibero-American Championships	Mar del Plata, Argentina	—	4 × 100 m relay	DNF
1994	Ibero-American Championships	Mar del Plata, Argentina	4th	4 × 400 m relay	3:08.27
1994	South American Games	Valencia, Venezuela	1st	200 m	20.1
1994	South American Games	Valencia, Venezuela	2nd	400 m	46.01
1994	South American Games	Valencia, Venezuela	1st	4 × 100 m relay	39.67
1994	South American Games	Valencia, Venezuela	1st	4 × 400 m relay	3:06.92
1995	World Indoor Championships	Barcelona, Spain	3rd	200 m	20.98
1995	Pan American Games	Mar del Plata, Argentina	3rd	200 m	20.55
1995	Universiade	Fukuoka, Japan	8th	200 m	21.14
1996	Ibero-American Championships	Medellín, Colombia	1st	100 m	10.13
1996	Ibero-American Championships	Medellín, Colombia	1st	200 m	20.53
1996	Olympic Games	Atlanta, United States	47th (h)	200 m	20.96
1997	World Indoor Championships	Paris, France	10th (sf)	200 m	21.17
1997	South American Championships	Mar del Plata, Argentina	1st	100 m	10.30
1997	South American Championships	Mar del Plata, Argentina	2nd	200 m	21.13
1997	South American Championships	Mar del Plata, Argentina	2nd	4 × 100 m relay	40.08
1997	World Championships	Athens, Greece	23rd (qf)	200 m	20.96
1997	Universiade	Catania, Italy	6th	200 m	20.89
1998	Ibero-American Championships	Lisbon, Portugal	1st	100 m	10.10
1998	Ibero-American Championships	Lisbon, Portugal	1st	200 m	20.16
1999	South American Championships	Bogotá, Colombia	2nd	100 m	10.13
1999	Pan American Games	Winnipeg, Canada	3rd	200 m	20.82
1999	World Championships	Seville, Spain	38th (h)	200 m	20.90
2000	Ibero-American Championships	Rio de Janeiro, Brazil	3rd	100 m	10.42
2000	Ibero-American Championships	Rio de Janeiro, Brazil	3rd	200 m	20.77
2000	Ibero-American Championships	Rio de Janeiro, Brazil	3rd	4 × 100 m relay	39.90
2002	Ibero-American Championships	Guatemala City, Guatemala	7th	100 m	10.43
2005	South American Championships	Cali, Colombia	9th (h)	200 m	21.50
2007	South American Championships	São Paulo, Brazil	10th (h)	200 m	21.70
2007	South American Championships	São Paulo, Brazil	7th	4 × 100 m relay	40.82

=== Personal bests ===
- 100 metres - 10.10 (1998)
- 200 metres - 20.15 (1998)

Olympic Games
Preceded by Nils Linneberg	Flagbearer for Chile; Atlanta 1996	Succeeded by Duncan Grob
