= Carlos Gats =

Argentine sprinter (born 1969)

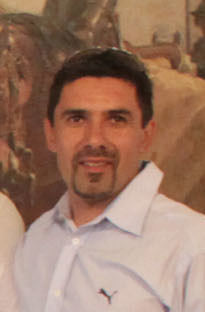
- Carlos Gats in 2012

Personal information
- Born: 11 December 1969 (age 56) Buenos Aires, Argentina
- Height: 1.81 m (5 ft 11 in)
- Weight: 73 kg (161 lb)

Sport
- Sport: Athletics
- Events: 100 m, 200 m
- Club: Capital Federal
Medal record
Representing Argentina
South American Games
Gold medal – first place	1990 Lima	200m
Silver medal – second place	1998 Cuenca	100m
Bronze medal – third place	1990 Lima	100m

Carlos Alberto Gats (born 11 December 1969) is a former Argentine athlete specializing in the sprinting events. He twice competed at the Olympic Games, at the 1996 and 2000 Summer Olympics. He is the current national record holder in the 100 and 200 metres outdoors and 200 metres indoors.

== Competition record ==
Year	Competition	Venue	Position	Event	Notes
Representing Argentina
1986	South American Junior Championships	Quito, Ecuador	13th (h)	100 m	10.9
1986	South American Junior Championships	Quito, Ecuador	9th (h)	200 m	22.37
1986	South American Junior Championships	Quito, Ecuador	3rd	4 × 100 m relay	41.57
1987	South American Junior Championships	Santiago, Chile	2nd	200 m	21.52
1987	South American Junior Championships	Santiago, Chile	1st	4 × 100 m relay	41.41
1987	South American Championships	São Paulo, Brazil	5th	200 m	21.66
1987	South American Championships	São Paulo, Brazil	2nd	4 × 100 m relay	40.72
1990	South American Games	Lima, Peru	3rd	100 m	10.84
1990	South American Games	Lima, Peru	1st	200 m	22.28
1992	Ibero-American Championships	Seville, Spain	6th	100 m	10.83 (-2.2 m/s)
1992	Ibero-American Championships	Seville, Spain	6th	200 m	21.98 (-2.6 m/s)
1992	Ibero-American Championships	Seville, Spain	6th	4 × 100 m relay	41.46
1993	South American Championships	Lima, Peru	6th	100 m	10.97
1993	South American Championships	Lima, Peru	6th	200 m	21.4
1994	Ibero-American Championships	Mar del Plata, Argentina	1st	100m	10.50 w (+3.2 m/s)
1994	Ibero-American Championships	Mar del Plata, Argentina	2nd	200m	20.51 (+1.2 m/s)
1994	Ibero-American Championships	Mar del Plata, Argentina	—	4 × 100 m relay	DNF
1995	Pan American Games	Mar del Plata, Argentina	7th	100 m	10.44 (w)
1995	Pan American Games	Mar del Plata, Argentina	7th	200 m	20.86
1995	Pan American Games	Mar del Plata, Argentina	6th	4 × 100 m relay	39.94
1995	South American Championships	Manaus, Brazil	3rd	100 m	10.51
1995	South American Championships	Manaus, Brazil	3rd	200 m	20.90
1995	South American Championships	Manaus, Brazil	3rd	4 × 100 m relay	40.78
1995	World Championships	Gothenburg, Sweden	41st (h)	200 m	21.02
1996	Ibero-American Championships	Medellín, Colombia	3rd	4 × 100 m relay	40.33
1996	Olympic Games	Atlanta, United States	61st (h)	100 m	10.57
1996	Olympic Games	Atlanta, United States	29th (qf)	200 m	21.15
1997	South American Championships	Mar del Plata, Argentina	3rd	100 m	10.46
1997	South American Championships	Mar del Plata, Argentina	4th	200 m	21.37
1997	South American Championships	Mar del Plata, Argentina	3rd	4 × 100 m relay	40.11
1997	World Championships	Athens, Greece	50th (h)	100 m	10.43
1997	World Championships	Athens, Greece	16th (sf)	200 m	21.44
1997	Universiade	Catania, Italy	7th	100 m	10.58
1998	Ibero-American Championships	Lisbon, Portugal	3rd	100 m	10.23 (NR)
1998	Ibero-American Championships	Lisbon, Portugal	2nd	200 m	20.37 (NR)
1998	South American Games	Cuenca, Ecuador	2nd	100 m	10.39
1999	World Indoor Championships	Maebashi, Japan	32nd (h)	60 m	6.82
1999	World Indoor Championships	Maebashi, Japan	15th (sf)	200 m	21.50
1999	South American Championships	Bogotá, Colombia	2nd	4 × 100 m relay	39.96
1999	South American Championships	Bogotá, Colombia	3rd	4 × 400 m relay	3:08.53 (NR)
1999	Pan American Games	Winnipeg, Canada	13th (h)	100 m	10.62
1999	Pan American Games	Winnipeg, Canada	14th (h)	200 m	21.29
1999	World Championships	Seville, Spain	49th (h)	100 m	10.55
1999	World Championships	Seville, Spain	–	200 m	DQ
2000	Ibero-American Championships	Rio de Janeiro, Brazil	4th	4 × 100 m relay	40.26
2000	Ibero-American Championships	Rio de Janeiro, Brazil	3rd	4 × 400 m relay	3:12.45
2000	Olympic Games	Sydney, Australia	46th (h)	200 m	21.15

== Personal bests ==
Outdoor

- 100 metres – 10.23 (+1.0 m/s) (Lisbon 1998)
- 200 metres – 20.37 (+0.7 m/s) (Lisbon 1998)
- 400 metres – 46.46 (Santa Fe 1998)

Indoor

- 60 metres – 6.78 (Madrid 1999)
- 200 metres – 21.27 (Valencia 1998)
