= Anderson Vilien =

Haitian sprinter

Personal information
- Nationality: Haitian
- Born: 31 December 1971 (age 54)

Sport
- Sport: Sprinting
- Event: 200 metres

Anderson Vilien (born 31 December 1971) is a Haitian sprinter. He competed in the men's 200 metres at the 1996 Summer Olympics.
