= Marcelo Brivilati da Silva =

Brazilian sprinter (born 1966)

Personal information
- Born: 19 February 1966 (age 59)

Sport
- Sport: Athletics
- Event: 200 meters
- Coached by: Katsuhiko Nakaya

Marcelo Brivilati da Silva (born 19 February 1966) is a retired Brazilian sprinter who specialised in the 200 metres. He represented his country at one outdoor and one indoor World Championships.

== International competitions ==
Year	Competition	Venue	Position	Event	Notes
Representing Brazil
1985	South American Junior Championships	Santa Fe, Argentina	2nd	200 m	21.74
1985	South American Junior Championships	Santa Fe, Argentina	1st	4 × 100 m relay	40.99
1990	Ibero-American Championships	Manaus, Brazil	2nd	200 m	21.43
1990	Ibero-American Championships	Manaus, Brazil	1st	4 × 100 m relay	40.37
1991	South American Championships	Manaus, Brazil	2nd	200 m	20.94
1993	South American Championships	Lima, Peru	1st	4 × 100 m relay	39.42
1994	Ibero-American Championships	Mar del Plata, Argentina	4th	200 m	20.69
1994	Ibero-American Championships	Mar del Plata, Argentina	2nd	4 × 100 m relay	40.53
1994	South American Games	Valencia, Venezuela	3rd	100 m	10.43
1994	South American Games	Valencia, Venezuela	2nd	4 × 100 m relay	39.76
1995	Pan American Games	Mar del Plata, Argentina	5th	200 m	20.78
1995	Pan American Games	Mar del Plata, Argentina	7th	4 × 100 m relay	40.07
1995	World Championships	Gothenburg, Sweden	41st (h)	200 m	21.02
1996	Ibero-American Championships	Medellín, Colombia	3rd	100 m	10.37
1996	Ibero-American Championships	Medellín, Colombia	2nd	200 m	20.71
1997	World Indoor Championships	Paris, France	21st (h)	200 m	21.50

== Personal bests ==
Outdoor

- 100 metres – 10.27 (+1.5 m/s, Rio de Janeiro 1997)
- 200 metres – 20.58 (+1.0 m/s, Mar del Plata 1995)

Indoor

- 200 metres – 21.50 (Paris 1997
