= Kurvin Wallace =

Kittian sprinter

Personal information
- Born: 11 October 1971 (age 54)

Sport
- Sport: Track and field

Kurvin Wallace (born 11 October 1971) is a retired Kittian sprinter who specialized in the 200 metres.

In the 100 metres he competed at the 1995 World Championships without reaching the final. He then reached the semi-final at the 1998 Central American and Caribbean Games and competed at the 2002 Commonwealth Games without reaching the final.

In the 200 metres, he competed at the 1995 Pan American Games and the 1995 World Championships without reaching the final. He then reached the semi-final at the 1998 Central American and Caribbean Games and competed at the 2002 Commonwealth Games without reaching the final.

In the 4 × 100 metres relay, he finished eighth at the 1995 Pan American Games and competed at the 1995 World Championships without reaching the final.
