= Andrew Tynes =

Bahamian sprinter

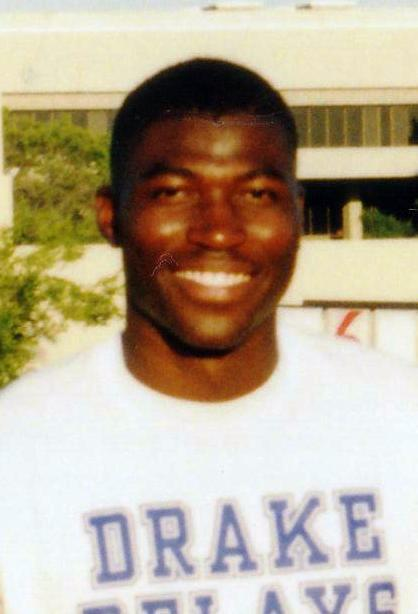

Personal information
- Born: 13 February 1972 (age 54)

Sport
- Sport: Track and field
Medal record
Athletics
Representing Bahamas
Central American and Caribbean Games
Gold medal – first place	1993 Ponce	200m
Bronze medal – third place	1998 Maracaibo	4x100m relay
CAC Junior Championships (U20)
Silver medal – second place	1990 Havana	200 m
Bronze medal – third place	1990 Havana	4x100 m relay
CARIFTA Games Junior (U20)
Gold medal – first place	1991 Port of Spain	200m
Silver medal – second place	1990 Kingston	200m

Andrew Tynes (born 13 February 1972) is a retired Bahamian sprinter who specialized in the 200 metres.

== Biography ==
Tynes was an NCAA champion sprinter for the UTEP Miners track and field team, winning the 200 m at the 1994 NCAA Division I Outdoor Track and Field Championships.

He won gold medals at the 1993 Central American and Caribbean Games and the 1993 Central American and Caribbean Championships, and a silver medal at the 1995 Pan American Games.

His personal best time was 20.22 seconds, achieved in April 1993 in El Paso, Texas. Tynes also co-holds the Bahamian record in the 4 x 100 metres relay, achieved with teammates Renward Wells, Dominic Demeritte and Iram Lewis.

== Achievements ==
Year	Competition	Venue	Position	Event	Performance
Representing the Bahamas
1988	Central American and Caribbean Junior Championships (U-17)	Nassau, Bahamas	6th	100 m	11.25 (0.3 m/s)
1988	Central American and Caribbean Junior Championships (U-17)	Nassau, Bahamas	7th	200 m	23.35 (0.3 m/s)
1990	CARIFTA Games (U-20)	Kingston, Jamaica	2nd	200 m	21.55 (-3.7 m/s)
1990	Central American and Caribbean Junior Championships (U-20)	Havana, Cuba	6th	100 m	10.72 (-0.1 m/s)
1990	Central American and Caribbean Junior Championships (U-20)	Havana, Cuba	2nd	200 m	21.27 (-0.9 m/s)
1990	Central American and Caribbean Junior Championships (U-20)	Havana, Cuba	3rd	4x100 m relay	41.74
1990	Central American and Caribbean Junior Championships (U-20)	Havana, Cuba	4th	4x400 m relay	3:13.62
1990	World Junior Championships	Plovdiv, Bulgaria	16th (sf)	200 m	21.57 (wind: -0.8 m/s)
1991	CARIFTA Games (U-20)	Port of Spain, Trinidad and Tobago	1st	200 m	21.11 (-3.7 m/s)
1993	Central American and Caribbean Games	Ponce, Puerto Rico	1st	200 m	20.64
1995	Pan American Games	Mar del Plata, Argentina	2nd	200 m	20.33
1995	World Championships	Gothenburg, Sweden	8th (sf)	200 m	20.72 (-0.9 m/s)
1995	World Championships	Gothenburg, Sweden	7th (sf)	4 x 100 m relay	39.65
1996	Olympic Games	Atlanta, United States	(sf)	4 x 100 m relay	DQ
1997	Central American and Caribbean Championships	San Juan, Puerto Rico	3rd	4 × 100 m relay	39.85
1997	World Championships	Athens, Greece	6th (h)	200 m	21.00 (-0.7 m/s)
1997	World Championships	Athens, Greece	7th (sf)	4 x 100 m relay	39.12
1998	Central American and Caribbean Games	Maracaibo, Venezuela	7th	200 m	21.24
1998	Central American and Caribbean Games	Maracaibo, Venezuela	3rd	4 × 100 m relay	39.54
2000	Olympic Games	Sydney, Australia	5th (h)	200 m	21.00 (-0.7 m/s)
2001	World Championships	Edmonton, Canada	6th (sf)	4 x 100 m relay	39.20
2002	Central American and Caribbean Games	San Salvador, El Salvador	3rd (h)	200m	21.48 (wind: 1.6 m/s)

== Notes ==
Olympians - Andrew Tynes, Bahamas Olympic Committee
