= Kevin Little =

American sprinter (born 1968)

Personal information
- Born: April 3, 1968 (age 58) Des Moines, Iowa, U.S.
- Height: 6 ft 0 in (1.83 m)
- Weight: 160 lb (73 kg)

Sport
- Sport: Running
- Events: 100m, 200m, 400m
Medal record
Men's athletics (track and field)
Representing United States
World Indoor Championships
Gold medal – first place	1997 Paris	200 metres
Bronze medal – third place	1989 Budapest	200 metres
Bronze medal – third place	1993 Toronto	200 metres
Bronze medal – third place	1999 Maebashi	200 metres
Pan-American Games
Silver medal – second place	1991 Havanna	200 metres

Kevin Little (born April 3, 1968) is a former American athlete, who specialized in sprints. He won the 200-meter race in the 1997 IAAF World Indoor Championships in Paris, France. He won bronze in the same event in 1989, 1993, and 1999 IAAF World Indoor Championships.

Little graduated from Ankeny High School in 1986. He won the state title in the 100-meter dash his senior season and the 200-meter dash both his junior and senior seasons. In college, he competed for Drake University. His best finish in college came when he finished second in the NCAA 200 in 1989.

== Competition record ==
Year	Competition	Venue	Position	Event	Notes
Representing the United States
1989	World Indoor Championships	Budapest, Hungary	3rd	200 m	21.12
1989	Universiade	Duisburg, West Germany	6th	200 m	20.83 (w)
1991	Pan American Games	Havana, Cuba	2nd	200 m	20.63
1993	World Indoor Championships	Toronto, Canada	3rd	200 m	20.72
1995	World Championships	Gothenburg, Sweden	16th (qf)	200 m	20.60
1997	World Indoor Championships	Paris, France	1st	200 m	20.40
1997	World Championships	Athens, Greece	11th (sf)	200 m	20.57
1999	World Indoor Championships	Maebashi, Japan	3rd	200 m	20.48
1999	World Championships	Seville, Spain	6th	200 m	20.37
2001	World Indoor Championships	Lisbon, Portugal	1st (sf)	200 m	20.73 (Note: Did not start in the final)
2001	World Championships	Edmonton, Canada	7th	200 m	20.25
2001	Goodwill Games	Brisbane, Australia	7th	200 m	20.90

== Personal bests ==
Little's personal bests are:

- 100 metres – 10.14 s (1996)
- 200 metres – 20.10 s (1999)
- 200 metres indoors – 20.32 s (1999)
- 400 metres – 44.77 s (1996)
