= Alain Reimann =

Swiss sprinter

Personal information
- Nationality: Swiss
- Born: 20 April 1967 (age 59) Zurich, Switzerland

Sport
- Sport: Sprinting
- Event: 200 metres

Alain Alfred Solli Reimann (born 20 April 1967) is a Swiss sprinter. He competed in the men's 200 metres at the 1996 Summer Olympics.
