= Ron Clark (sprinter) =

American sprinter

Personal information
- Born: November 1, 1969 (age 56)
Medal record
Men's athletics
Pan American Games
| Silver medal – second place | 1995 Mar del Plata | 4×100 m relay |

Ron Clark (born November 1, 1969) is a retired American sprinter who specialized in the 200 metres.

Clark broke through in 1994 by winning the 200 metre dash at the USA Outdoor Track and Field Championships. He also finished fourth at the 1994 IAAF World Cup, eighth at the 1994 Goodwill Games and sixth at the 1995 Pan American Games, and also won a silver medal in the 4 × 100 metres relay at the same games.

His personal best time was 20.47 seconds, achieved in July 1994 in Gateshead. He also had 10.21 seconds in the 100 metres, achieved in June 1994 in Knoxville. He was furthermore clocked in 9.8 seconds with hand timing in May 1995 in Houston.
