= Mark Keddell =

New Zealand sprinter (born 1975)

Personal information
- Nationality: New Zealand
- Born: 13 February 1975 (age 51) Christchurch, New Zealand

Sport
- Sport: Sprinting
- Event: 200 metres

Mark Keddell (born 13 February 1975) is a New Zealand sprinter who represented his country in the men's 200 metres at the 1996 Summer Olympics.. In 1995, Keddell won the 100m and 200m titles at the New Zealand Track and Field Nationals. On 4 February the same year he set a New Zealand record of 20.51 for 200m. This was the New Zealand record until Chris Donaldson bettered it by running 20.42 in March 1997. Keddell currently ranks fifth on the New Zealand all-time 200m list.
