= Francisco Navarro (athlete) =

Spanish sprinter

Personal information
- Full name: Francisco Javier Navarro Sánchez
- Nationality: Spanish
- Born: 16 April 1967 (age 59) Cartagena, Spain

Sport
- Sport: Sprinting
- Event: 200 metres
Medal record
Representing Spain
Mediterranean Games
Silver medal – second place	1997 Bari	4x100m relay

Francisco Javier Navarro Sánchez (born 16 April 1967) is a Spanish sprinter. He competed in the men's 200 metres at the 1996 Summer Olympics.
