= O'Brian Gibbons =

Canadian sprinter (born 1970)

Personal information
- Born: 1 November 1970 (age 55) Toronto, Ontario, Canada

Sport
- Sport: Track and field
Medal record
Representing Canada
Commonwealth Games
Silver medal – second place	1998 Kuala Lumpur	4x100m relay

Keith O'Brian Gibbons (born 1 November 1970) is a retired Canadian sprinter who specialized in the 200 metres.

Gibbons became Canadian 200 metre champion in 1998. He competed at the 1996 Olympic Games, the 1997 World Championships, the 1999 World Indoor Championships (both 60 and 200 metres), and the 2001 Jeux de la Francophonie. He also represented Canada at the 1993 and 1995 World University Games in Buffalo and Fukuoka, Japan. With the Canadian relay team he won a silver medal at the 1998 Commonwealth Games running the 3rd leg.

His personal best times were 6.64 seconds in the 60 metres, achieved in March 1999 in Maebashi; 6.63 at World Indoors in Toronto, achieved in March 1993; 10.10 seconds in the 100 metres, achieved in August 1998 in Montreal; and 20.63 seconds in the 200 metres, achieved in 1998.
