= Gary Ryan (athlete) =

Irish sprinter, athletics coach and sports administrator

Personal information
- Born: 12 June 1972 (age 54) Kilcommon, County Tipperary, Ireland

Sport
- Sport: Track and field
Medal record
Representing Ireland
World Indoor Championships
Bronze medal – third place	2004 Budapest	4x400m relay

Gary Ryan (born 12 June 1972) is a former Irish sprinter who specialised in the 200 metres. On retirement he worked for the Irish athletics association as Director of Coaching before leaving in January 2009 for a position with the National University of Ireland, Galway.

Ryan won the bronze medal in 4 x 400 metres relay at the 2004 World Indoor Championships, together with teammates Robert Daly, David Gillick and David McCarthy.

His personal best time is 20.67 seconds, achieved in August 1997 in Catania.

Ryan is a member, as of 2019, of the Board of Sport Ireland.
