= Iván García (sprinter) =

Cuban sprinter (born 1972)

Personal information
- Born: February 29, 1972 (age 54) Santiago de Cuba, Cuba

Sport
- Sport: Track and field
Medal record
Athletics
Representing Cuba
Olympic Games
Bronze medal – third place	2000 Sydney	4x100m relay
World Indoor Championships
Silver medal – second place	1997 Paris	200m
Summer Universiade
Bronze medal – third place	1993 Buffalo	200m
Bronze medal – third place	1993 Buffalo	4x100m relay
Pan American Games
Gold medal – first place	1995 Mar del Plata	200m
Gold medal – first place	1995 Mar del Plata	4x100m relay
Central American and Caribbean Games
Gold medal – first place	1993 Ponce	4x100m relay
Gold medal – first place	1998 Maracaibo	4x100m relay
Silver medal – second place	1993 Ponce	200m
Bronze medal – third place	1998 Maracaibo	200m
CAC Junior Championships (U20)
Gold medal – first place	1990 Havana	4x100 m relay

Iván García Sánchez (born February 29, 1972) is a former sprinter from Cuba.

== Career ==
He won an Olympic bronze medal in 4 x 100 metres relay in Sydney 2000. He specialized in the 200 metres event and won a silver medal at the 1997 IAAF World Indoor Championships. He finished fourth at the 1993 IAAF World Indoor Championships.

== Personal bests ==
- 100 metres - 10.21 (1994)
- 200 metres - 20.17 (1995)

== Achievements ==
Year	Competition	Venue	Position	Event	Notes
Representing Cuba
1990	Central American and Caribbean Junior Championships (U-20)	Havana, Cuba	1st	4 × 100 m	40.62
1993	World Indoor Championships	Toronto, Canada	4th	200 m	20.82
1993	Universiade	Buffalo, United States	3rd	200 m	20.55 (w)
1993	Universiade	Buffalo, United States	3rd	4 × 100 m	39.20
1993	Central American and Caribbean Games	Ponce, Puerto Rico	2nd	200 m	20.71
1993	Central American and Caribbean Games	Ponce, Puerto Rico	1st	4 × 100 m	39.24
1994	Goodwill Games	St. Petersburg, Russia	2nd	4 × 100 m	38.76
1994	Goodwill Games	St. Petersburg, Russia	2nd	4 × 400 m	3:01.87
1995	Pan American Games	Mar del Plata, Argentina	1st	200 m	20.29
1995	Pan American Games	Mar del Plata, Argentina	1st	4 × 100 m	38.67
1995	World Championships	Gothenburg, Sweden	8th	200 m	20.77 (0.5 m/s)
1996	Olympic Games	Atlanta, United States	6th	200 m	20.21 (0.4 m/s)
1997	World Indoor Championships	Paris, France	2nd	200 m	20.46 PB
1997	Central American and Caribbean Championships	San Juan, Puerto Rico	1st	4 × 100 m	39.18
1997	World Championships	Athens, Greece	4th	200 m	20.31 w (2.3 m/s)
1998	Central American and Caribbean Games	Maracaibo, Venezuela	3rd	200 m	20.81
1998	Central American and Caribbean Games	Maracaibo, Venezuela	1st	4 × 100 m	38.79
1999	World Championships	Seville, Spain	6th (sf)	200 m	20.38 (1.7 m/s)
1999	World Championships	Seville, Spain	4th	4 × 100 m	38.63
2000	Olympic Games	Sydney, Australia	3rd	4 × 100 m	38.04 SB
