= Chris Donaldson =

New Zealand sprinter (born 1975)

Chris Donaldson (born 26 May 1975 in Auckland, New Zealand) is a New Zealand sprinter who represented his country at the 1996 and 2000 Summer Olympics. He is the son of film director Roger Donaldson. He also competed at the 1998 and 2006 Commonwealth Games. He was part of the 4 by 100m relay team that set the current national record. Currently, Chris is the strength and conditioning coach of the NZ National Cricket team. He has been appointed as the strength and conditioning coach of the IPL franchise Kolkata Knight Riders.

== Personal bests ==
Distance	Time	Place	Date
100 m	10.17	Kuala Lumpur	1998
200 m	20.42 NR	Melbourne	1997
4 × 100 m relay	38.99 NR	Sydney	2005
