= Athletics at the 1997 Summer Universiade – Men's 4 × 100 metres relay =

The men's 4 × 100 metres relay event at the 1997 Summer Universiade was held at the Stadio Cibali in Catania, Italy, on 30 and 31 August.

== Results ==
=== Heats ===
Rank	Heat	Nation	Athletes	Time	Notes
1	2	Cuba	Alfredo García, Luis Alberto Pérez Rionda, Iván García, Misael Ortiz	38.99	Q
2	3	United States	Tony McCall, Bryan Howard, David Dopek, Gentry Bradley	39.22	Q
3	2	Canada	Eric Frempong-Manson, Trevino Betty, Robert Esmie, Carlton Chambers	39.54	q
4	2	Great Britain	Jamie Henthorn, Daniel Money, Ross Baillie, Douglas Walker	39.58	q
5	2	Japan	Masato Ebisawa, Yasukatsu Otsuki, Takafumi Onoda, Yasuhide Nishikawa	39.72	q
6	1	Spain	Carlos Berlanga, Frutos Feo, Jordi Mayoral, Ángel Antonio García	39.77	Q
7	1	Poland	Ryszard Pilarczyk, Dariusz Adamczyk, Krzysztof Byzdra, Marcin Krzywański	39.81	q
8	1	Italy	Carlo Occhiena, Andrea Colombo, Paolo Bellino, Nicola Asuni	40.06	q
9	1	Australia	Rod Mapstone, Paul Pearce, David Baxter, Paul Di Bella	40.15	
10	1	Netherlands	Auke Klaarenbeek, Patrick van Balkom, Niels Kruller, Martijn Ungerer	40.32	
11	3	Mexico	Carlos Villaseñor, César López, Jaime López, Alejandro Banda	40.34	
12	3	Nigeria	Samson Agiri, Akin Akinremi, Olatunji Olayemi, Ambrose Ezenwa	40.37	
13	3	Switzerland	Raphaël Monachon, Thomas Portmann, Daniel Dubois, Marcel Schelbert	40.75	
14	3	New Zealand	Donald MacDonald, Henry Semiti Rogo, Michael Sharapoff, Nick Cowan	40.91	
15	1	Chile	Diego Moraga, Carlos Zbinden, Juan Pablo Faúndez, Pablo Almeida	41.43	
16	3	Namibia	Immanuel Kharigub, Christie van Wyk, Thobias Akwenye, Zepee Mberivana	41.60	
17	3	Uganda	Richard Obonya, John Mugabi, Samuel Dawa, Moses Asonya	41.73	
18	1	Macau	Chau Wai Choi, Cheong Chi Fong, Chong Ka Man, Wong Chi Fai	44.70	
	1	Slovenia	Tomaž Božič, Urban Acman, Marko Stor, Gregor Breznik	DNF	
	2	Brazil	Cláudio Roberto Souza, Marcio Cardoso, Emerson Perin, Márcio de Souza	DNF	
	2	Jordan	Raiea Khrasat, Yahya Al-Quran, Mohamed Abdelbaki, Shadi Al-Fandi	DQ	
	2	Peru	Luis Romero, Javier Chirinos, Manuel Oliveira, Javier Verme	DQ	

=== Final ===
Rank	Nation	Athletes	Time	Notes
1st place, gold medalist(s)	United States	Bryan Howard, Jonathan Carter, Vincent Henderson, Tony McCall	38.48	
2nd place, silver medalist(s)	Cuba	Alfredo García, Luis Alberto Pérez Rionda, Misael Ortiz, Iván García	38.52	
3rd place, bronze medalist(s)	Great Britain	Ross Baillie, Daniel Money, Douglas Walker, Jamie Henthorn	39.23	
4	Poland	Krzysztof Byzdra, Marcin Krzywański, Ryszard Pilarczyk, Dariusz Adamczyk	39.39	
5	Italy	Nicola Asuni, Alessandro Meli, Carlo Occhiena, Andrea Colombo	39.48	
6	Japan	Takafumi Onoda, Yasuhide Nishikawa, Yasukatsu Otsuki, Masato Ebisawa	39.82	
	Canada	Eric Frempong-Manson, Robert Esmie, Trevino Betty, Carlton Chambers	DNF	
	Spain	Carlos Berlanga, Frutos Feo, Jordi Mayoral, Ángel Antonio García	DQ	
