= Athletics at the 1997 Summer Universiade – Men's 100 metres =

The men's 100 metres event at the 1997 Summer Universiade was held on 28–29 August at the Stadio Cibali in Catania, Italy.

== Medalists ==
Gold	Silver	Bronze
Vincent Henderson; United States	Aleksandr Porkhomovskiy; Russia	Jonathan Carter; United States

== Results ==
=== Heats ===
Wind:
Heat 5: 0.0 m/s, Heat 9: -1.3 m/s, Heat 10: -2.1 m/s

Rank	Heat	Athlete	Nationality	Time	Notes
1	3	Vincent Henderson	United States	10.46	Q
2	2	Daniel Money	Great Britain	10.52	Q
2	2	Ryszard Pilarczyk	Poland	10.52	Q
2	5	Jamie Henthorn	Great Britain	10.52	Q
5	5	Jonathan Carter	United States	10.53	Q
6	6	Aleksandr Porkhomovskiy	Russia	10.56	Q
7	3	Andrea Amici	Italy	10.62	Q
8	5	Paulo Neves	Portugal	10.63	Q
8	10	Marcin Krzywański	Poland	10.63	Q
10	8	Martin Lachkovics	Austria	10.65	Q
11	10	Frutos Feo	Spain	10.66	Q
12	3	Mário Barbosa	Portugal	10.67	Q
13	6	Vitaly Medvedev	Kazakhstan	10.68	Q
14	6	Akin Akinremi	Nigeria	10.69	Q
15	8	Robert Esmie	Canada	10.70	Q
15	10	Jassem Abbas	Qatar	10.70	Q
17	1	Sebastián Keitel	Chile	10.71	Q
17	2	Roger Gräber	Germany	10.71	Q
19	4	Carlos Gats	Argentina	10.72	Q
19	9	Cláudio Roberto Souza	Brazil	10.72	Q
21	7	Carlos Villaseñor	Mexico	10.73	Q
22	4	Patrick van Balkom	Netherlands	10.74	Q
23	1	Yasukatsu Otsuki	Japan	10.75	Q
23	2	Dejan Vojnović	Croatia	10.75	q
23	9	Alfredo García	Cuba	10.75	Q
26	9	Koji Ono	Japan	10.78	Q
27	4	Franklin Nwankpa	Nigeria	10.79	Q
27	7	Urban Acman	Slovenia	10.79	Q
29	4	Tom Comyns	Ireland	10.81	q
30	9	Gary Ryan	Ireland	10.82	
31	5	Donald MacDonald	New Zealand	10.84	
32	5	Stéphane Diriwächter	Switzerland	10.85	
32	10	Niklas Sjöstrand	Sweden	10.85	
34	7	Carlos Berlanga	Spain	10.88	Q
34	10	Serhiy Polenkov	Ukraine	10.88	
36	9	Rod Mapstone	Australia	10.90	
37	4	Jimmy Pino	Colombia	10.91	
38	10	Tomaž Božič	Slovenia	10.92	
39	8	Daniel Dubois	Switzerland	10.93	Q
40	9	Serge Angrand	Senegal	10.94	
41	7	Ruslan Rusidze	Georgia	10.96	
42	1	Andrey Grigoryev	Russia	10.97	Q
43	10	Milen Nikolov	Bulgaria	11.02	
44	2	John Mugabi	Uganda	11.07	
45	6	Francesco Scuderi	Italy	11.07	
46	4	Sokol Shepeteja	Algeria	11.08	
47	6	Mario Bonello	Malta	11.11	
47	6	Christie van Wyk	Namibia	11.11	
49	9	Manuel Oliveira	Peru	11.13	
50	1	Ophir Shmueli	Israel	11.15	
51	1	Chau Wai Choi	Macau	11.17	
52	10	Sylvester Owino	Kenya	11.27	
53	5	Fathi Youssif	Sudan	11.28	
54	2	Zepee Mberivana	Namibia	11.29	
55	8	Samuel Dawa	Uganda	11.29	
56	7	Shadi Qaaqour	Jordan	11.33	
57	3	Ricardo Roach	Chile	11.36	
58	3	Javier Chirinos	Peru	11.42	
59	8	Mohsen Sattari	Iran	11.43	
60	6	Kabba-Sei Coomber	Sierra Leone	11.45	
61	7	Lee To	Hong Kong	11.53	
62	3	Raiea Khrasat	Jordan	11.65	
63	4	Chong Ka Man	Macau	11.79	
64	8	An Dang Hoai	Vietnam	11.82	
65	2	Pietro Faetanini	San Marino	11.83	
	1	Malik Louahla	Algeria	DQ	

=== Quarterfinals ===
Wind:
Heat 1: +0.4 m/s, Heat 2: +0.3 m/s, Heat 3: 0.0 m/s, Heat 4: -0.1 m/s

Rank	Heat	Athlete	Nationality	Time	Notes
1	1	Vincent Henderson	United States	10.26	Q
2	4	Aleksandr Porkhomovskiy	Russia	10.31	Q
3	3	Daniel Money	Great Britain	10.32	Q, PB
4	4	Jonathan Carter	United States	10.33	Q
5	2	Ryszard Pilarczyk	Poland	10.34	Q
6	1	Cláudio Roberto Souza	Brazil	10.42	Q
7	4	Andrea Amici	Italy	10.43	Q
8	1	Carlos Gats	Argentina	10.44	Q
9	2	Jamie Henthorn	Great Britain	10.45	Q
10	4	Marcin Krzywański	Poland	10.46	Q
11	3	Vitaly Medvedev	Kazakhstan	10.47	Q
12	2	Martin Lachkovics	Austria	10.48	Q
12	3	Carlos Villaseñor	Mexico	10.48	Q
14	4	Paulo Neves	Portugal	10.52	
14	3	Sebastián Keitel	Chile	10.52	Q
16	2	Frutos Feo	Spain	10.54	Q
17	1	Patrick van Balkom	Netherlands	10.55	Q
18	3	Yasukatsu Otsuki	Japan	10.57	
18	4	Urban Acman	Slovenia	10.57	
20	1	Jassem Abbas	Qatar	10.59	
21	2	Alfredo García	Cuba	10.60	
21	2	Mário Barbosa	Portugal	10.60	
23	3	Carlos Berlanga	Spain	10.61	
24	4	Daniel Dubois	Switzerland	10.63	
25	3	Akin Akinremi	Nigeria	10.65	
26	2	Koji Ono	Japan	10.68	
27	1	Roger Gräber	Germany	10.73	
28	1	Tom Comyns	Ireland	10.75	
29	4	Franklin Nwankpa	Nigeria	10.80	
30	2	Andrey Grigoryev	Russia	10.99	
	?	Dejan Vojnović	Croatia	?	
	?	Robert Esmie	Canada	DNS	

=== Semifinals ===
Wind:
Heat 1: +3.9 m/s, Heat 2: +1.9 m/s

Rank	Heat	Athlete	Nationality	Time	Notes
1	1	Vincent Henderson	United States	9.94	Q
2	1	Ryszard Pilarczyk	Poland	10.21	Q
3	1	Jamie Henthorn	United Kingdom	10.22	Q
4	1	Patrick van Balkom	Netherlands	10.25	Q
5	2	Aleksandr Porkhomovskiy	Russia	10.31	Q
6	1	Andrea Amici	Italy	10.32	
7	2	Daniel Money	Great Britain	10.32	Q
8	2	Jonathan Carter	United States	10.36	Q
9	1	Cláudio Roberto Souza	Brazil	10.37	Q
10	2	Carlos Gats	Argentina	10.44	Q
11	2	Frutos Feo	Spain	10.45	
12	1	Carlos Villaseñor	Mexico	10.48	
13	2	Martin Lachkovics	Austria	10.50	
14	2	Vitaly Medvedev	Kazakhstan	10.57	
15	2	Marcin Krzywański	Poland	10.58	
	1	Sebastián Keitel	Chile	DNF	

=== Final ===
Wind: -0.5 m/s

Rank	Athlete	Nationality	Time	Notes
1st place, gold medalist(s)	Vincent Henderson	United States	10.22	
2nd place, silver medalist(s)	Aleksandr Porkhomovskiy	Russia	10.39	
3rd place, bronze medalist(s)	Jonathan Carter	United States	10.42	
4	Daniel Money	Great Britain	10.42	
5	Jamie Henthorn	Great Britain	10.45	
6	Patrick van Balkom	Netherlands	10.54	
7	Carlos Gats	Argentina	10.58	
8	Ryszard Pilarczyk	Poland	10.59	
