= Athletics at the 1997 Summer Universiade – Men's 200 metres =

The men's 200 metres event at the 1997 Summer Universiade was held on 26 and 27 August at the Stadio Cibali in Catania, Italy.

== Medalists ==
| Gold | Silver | Bronze |
|---|---|---|
| Gentry Bradley; United States | Tony Wheeler; United States | Anninos Marcoullides; Cyprus |

== Results ==
=== Heats ===
Wind:
Heat 1: +1.3 m/s, Heat 5: +0.1 m/s, Heat 7: +1.5 m/s, Heat 9: +2.2 m/s

| Rank | Heat | Athlete | Nationality | Time | Notes |
|---|---|---|---|---|---|
| 1 | 9 | Tony Wheeler | United States | 20.64 | Q |
| 1 | 3 | Gentry Bradley | United States | 21.02 | Q |
| 1 | 1 | Sebastián Keitel | Chile | 21.04 | Q |
| 2 | 9 | Andrea Colombo | Italy | 21.07 | Q |
| 3 | 9 | Cláudio Roberto Souza | Brazil | 21.08 | Q |
| 2 | 1 | Misael Ortiz | Cuba | 21.09 | Q |
| 1 | 5 | Anninos Marcoullides | Cyprus | 21.12 | Q |
| 1 | 4 | Gary Ryan | Ireland | 21.14 | Q |
| 3 | 1 | Dennis Blake | Jamaica | 21.18 | Q |
| 1 | 7 | Jordi Mayoral | Spain | 21.20 | Q |
| 1 | 2 | Patrick van Balkom | Netherlands | 21.21 | Q |
| 2 | 5 | Vitaliy Seniv | Ukraine | 21.25 | Q |
| 2 | 3 | Malik Louahla | Algeria | 21.28 | Q |
| 1 | 8 | Roman Galkin | Ukraine | 21.28 | Q |
| 2 | 2 | Justice Dipeba | Botswana | 21.29 | Q |
| 2 | 7 | Kenden Maynard | United States Virgin Islands | 21.30 | Q |
| 2 | 8 | Eric Fremopong-Manson | Canada | 21.31 | Q |
| 3 | 2 | Thomas Portmann | Switzerland | 21.32 | Q |
| 3 | 3 | Ricardo Roach | Chile | 21.36 | Q |
| 3 | 7 | Paul Pearce | Australia | 21.41 | Q |
| 2 | 4 | Carlo Occhiena | Italy | 21.42 | Q |
| 3 | 5 | Roger Gräber | Germany | 21.43 | Q |
| 4 | 9 | Mario Bonello | Malta | 21.43 | q |
| 4 | 5 | Krzysztof Byzdra | Poland | 21.52 | q |
| 1 | 6 | Christoph Pöstinger | Austria | 21.52 | Q |
| 3 | 4 | Milen Nikolov | Bulgaria | 21.53 | Q |
| 4 | 4 | Uwe Eisenbeis | Germany | 21.55 | q |
| 5 | 5 | Donald MacDonald | New Zealand | 21.55 | q |
| 3 | 8 | Gregor Breznik | Slovenia | 21.57 | Q |
| 4 | 7 | Alejandro Banda | Mexico | 21.58 | q |
| 6 | 5 | Tom Comyns | Ireland | 21.61 | |
| 2 | 6 | Richard Knowles | Great Britain | 21.61 | Q |
| 4 | 8 | Takafumi Onoda | Japan | 21.62 | |
| 5 | 9 | Auke Klaarenbeek | Netherlands | 21.68 | |
| 3 | 6 | Masato Ebisawa | Japan | 21.69 | Q |
| 4 | 1 | Akin Akinremi | Nigeria | 21.70 | |
| 5 | 7 | Niclas Sjöstrand | Sweden | 21.73 | |
| 6 | 7 | Christie van Wyk | Namibia | 21.83 | |
| 5 | 1 | Javier Verme | Peru | 21.95 | |
| 5 | 8 | Thobias Akwenye | Namibia | 22.07 | |
| 6 | 9 | Emmanuel Rubayiza | Rwanda | 22.17 | |
| 6 | 1 | Shadi Qaaqour | Jordan | 22.27 | |
| 4 | 2 | Manuel Oliveira | Peru | 22.34 | |
| 4 | 6 | Jimmy Pino | Colombia | 22.34 | |
| 4 | 3 | Samuel Dawa | Uganda | 22.45 | |
| 5 | 4 | Serge Angrand | Senegal | 22.49 | |
| 5 | 3 | Mohsen Sattari | Iran | 22.52 | |
| 5 | 6 | Ambrose Ezenwa | Nigeria | 22.59 | |
| 7 | 7 | John Mugabi | Uganda | 22.66 | |
| 7 | 9 | Fathi Youssif | Sudan | 22.68 | |
| 5 | 2 | Sylvester Owino | Kenya | 22.69 | |
| 6 | 4 | Paohane Bothale | Botswana | 22.69 | |
| 8 | 7 | Tung Chung Man | Hong Kong | 22.93 | |
| 6 | 8 | Chau Wai Choi | Macau | 23.04 | |
| 6 | 6 | Chong Ka Man | Macau | 24.32 | |
| 6 | 2 | Shadi Al-Fandi | Jordan | 24.77 | |

=== Quarterfinals ===
Wind:
Heat 1: +1.3 m/s, Heat 2: +1.8 m/s, Heat 3: +1.5 m/s, Heat 4: +0.6 m/s

| Rank | Heat | Athlete | Nationality | Time | Notes |
|---|---|---|---|---|---|
| 1 | 3 | Anninos Marcoullides | Cyprus | 20.64 | Q |
| 2 | 3 | Gary Ryan | Ireland | 20.67 | Q |
| 3 | 1 | Tony Wheeler | United States | 20.76 | Q |
| 4 | 2 | Gentry Bradley | United States | 20.81 | Q |
| 5 | 1 | Christoph Pöstinger | Austria | 20.92 | Q |
| 6 | 2 | Patrick van Balkom | Netherlands | 20.95 | Q |
| 7 | 3 | Vitaliy Seniv | Ukraine | 20.98 | Q |
| 8 | 4 | Sebastián Keitel | Chile | 20.99 | Q |
| 9 | 2 | Kenden Maynard | United States Virgin Islands | 21.06 | Q |
| 10 | 4 | Jordi Mayoral | Spain | 21.08 | Q |
| 11 | 3 | Malik Louahla | Algeria | 21.11 | Q |
| 12 | 1 | Carlo Occhiena | Italy | 21.13 | Q |
| 13 | 4 | Misael Ortiz | Cuba | 21.14 | Q |
| 13 | 2 | Andrea Colombo | Italy | 21.14 | Q |
| 15 | 1 | Roman Galkin | Ukraine | 21.18 | Q |
| 16 | 2 | Ricardo Roach | Chile | 21.28 | |
| 17 | 1 | Eric Fremopong-Manson | Canada | 21.30 | |
| 17 | 2 | Gregor Breznik | Slovenia | 21.30 | |
| 19 | 3 | Thomas Portmann | Switzerland | 21.31 | |
| 19 | 4 | Justice Dipeba | Botswana | 21.31 | Q |
| 21 | 4 | Cláudio Roberto Souza | Brazil | 21.34 | |
| 22 | 4 | Masato Ebisawa | Japan | 21.36 | |
| 23 | 3 | Dennis Blake | Jamaica | 21.37 | |
| 24 | 3 | Krzysztof Byzdra | Poland | 21.38 | |
| 25 | 4 | Paul Pearce | Australia | 21.45 | |
| 26 | 4 | Uwe Eisenbeis | Germany | 21.49 | |
| 27 | 1 | Roger Gräber | Germany | 21.57 | |
| 28 | 3 | Mario Bonello | Malta | 21.60 | |
| 29 | 2 | Richard Knowles | Great Britain | 21.63 | |
| 30 | 2 | Donald MacDonald | New Zealand | 21.67 | |
| 31 | 1 | Milen Nikolov | Bulgaria | 21.74 | |
| | 1 | Alejandro Banda | Mexico | ? | |

=== Semifinals ===
Wind:
Heat 1: -0.7 m/s, Heat 2: -0.4 m/s

| Rank | Heat | Athlete | Nationality | Time | Notes |
|---|---|---|---|---|---|
| 1 | 1 | Gentry Bradley | United States | 20.68 | Q |
| 2 | 1 | Anninos Marcoullides | Cyprus | 20.69 | Q |
| 3 | 1 | Gary Ryan | Ireland | 20.77 | Q |
| 4 | 1 | Misael Ortiz | Cuba | 20.93 | Q |
| 4 | 2 | Christoph Pöstinger | Austria | 20.93 | Q |
| 6 | 2 | Tony Wheeler | United States | 20.99 | Q |
| 6 | 2 | Sebastián Keitel | Chile | 20.99 | Q |
| 8 | 1 | Vitaliy Seniv | Ukraine | 21.07 | |
| 9 | 2 | Patrick van Balkom | Netherlands | 21.09 | Q |
| 10 | 1 | Jordi Mayoral | Spain | 21.17 | |
| 11 | 2 | Justice Dipeba | Botswana | 21.21 | |
| 12 | 2 | Roman Galkin | Ukraine | 21.22 | |
| 13 | 1 | Andrea Colombo | Italy | 21.26 | |
| 14 | 1 | Malik Louahla | Algeria | 21.27 | |
| 15 | 2 | Carlo Occhiena | Italy | 21.49 | |
| 16 | 2 | Kenden Maynard | United States Virgin Islands | 21.53 | |

=== Final ===
Wind: -0.3 m/s

| Rank | Athlete | Nationality | Time | Notes |
|---|---|---|---|---|
| 1st place, gold medalist(s) | Gentry Bradley | United States | 20.48 | |
| 2nd place, silver medalist(s) | Tony Wheeler | United States | 20.64 | |
| 3rd place, bronze medalist(s) | Anninos Marcoullides | Cyprus | 20.72 | |
| 4 | Gary Ryan | Ireland | 20.83 | |
| 5 | Christoph Pöstinger | Austria | 20.83 | |
| 6 | Sebastián Keitel | Chile | 20.89 | |
| 7 | Misael Ortiz | Cuba | 20.98 | |
| 8 | Patrick van Balkom | Netherlands | 21.14 | |
