= 1996 European Cup Super League =

These are the full results of the 1996 European Cup Super League in athletics which was held on 1 and 2 June 1996 at the Olympic Stadium in Madrid, Spain. It was the first edition to use the name SPAR European Cup for the top division.

== Team standings ==
Men
Pos.	Nation	Points
1	Germany	142
2	Great Britain	125
3	Italy	110
4	Spain	106
5	Russia	103
6	France	93.5
7	Ukraine	84
8	Sweden	75.5
9	Finland	53

Women
Pos.	Nation	Points
1	Germany	115
2	Russia	97
3	Belarus	79
4	Ukraine	78
5	France	75
6	Great Britain	73
7	Spain	49
8	Bulgaria	46

== Men's results ==
=== 100 metres ===
1 June
Wind: +0.8 m/s

Rank	Name	Nationality	Time	Notes	Points
1	Linford Christie	Great Britain	10.04	CR	9
2	Marc Blume	Germany	10.25		8
3	Vladyslav Dologodin	Ukraine	10.26		7
4	Pascal Théophile	France	10.34		6
5	Peter Karlsson	Sweden	10.35		5
6	Venancio José	Spain	10.39		4
7	Giovanni Puggioni	Italy	10.40		3
8	Aleksandr Sokolov	Russia	10.57		2
9	Sami Lansivuori	Finland	10.66		1

=== 200 metres ===
2 June
Wind: +2.5 m/s

Rank	Name	Nationality	Time	Notes	Points
1	Linford Christie	Great Britain	20.25		9
2	Vladyslav Dologodin	Ukraine	20.39		8
3	Torbjörn Eriksson	Sweden	20.45		7
4	Marc Blume	Germany	20.50		6
5	Christophe Cheval	France	20.66		5
6	Angelo Cipolloni	Italy	20.69		4
7	Francisco Javier Navarro	Spain	20.79		3
8	Ari Pakarinen	Finland	20.79		2
9	Aleksandr Porkhomovskiy	Russia	21.13		1

=== 400 metres ===
1 June

Rank	Name	Nationality	Time	Notes	Points
1	Uwe Jahn	Germany	45.64		9
2	Du'aine Ladejo	Great Britain	45.72		8
3	Jean-Louis Rapnouil	France	45.96		7
4	Valentin Kulbatskyy	Ukraine	46.60		6
5	Andrea Nuti	Italy	46.66		5
6	Sergey Voronin	Russia	47.25		4
7	Niklas Wallenlind	Sweden	47.32		3
8	Kari Louramo	Finland	47.39		2
9	Miguel Cuesta	Spain	47.52		1

=== 800 metres ===
2 June

Rank	Name	Nationality	Time	Notes	Points
1	Roberto Parra	Spain	1:44.97	CR	9
2	Giuseppe D'Urso	Italy	1:45.27		8
3	Nico Motchebon	Germany	1:45.98		7
4	David Strang	Great Britain	1:46.38		6
5	Bruno Konczylo	France	1:46.63		5
6	Anatoliy Yakymovych	Ukraine	1:46.80		4
7	Martin Enholm	Sweden	1:47.05		3
8	Tomi Kankare	Finland	1:47.78		2
9	Sergey Kozhevnikov	Russia	1:49.80		1

=== 1500 metres ===
1 June

Rank	Name	Nationality	Time	Notes	Points
1	Fermín Cacho	Spain	3:40.24		9
2	Rüdiger Stenzel	Germany	3:40.53		8
3	Anthony Whiteman	Great Britain	3:41.21		7
4	Mickaël Damian	France	3:42.06		6
5	Jörgen Zaki	Sweden	3:42.10		5
6	Gennaro Di Napoli	Italy	3:42.26		4
7	Andrey Zadorozhniy	Russia	3:45.96		3
8	Dmytro Lisitsyn	Ukraine	3:48.95		2
9	Sami Valtonen	Finland	3:50.65		1

=== 3000 metres ===
2 June

Rank	Name	Nationality	Time	Notes	Points
1	Dieter Baumann	Germany	7:57.19		9
2	Isaac Viciosa	Spain	7:57.80		8
3	Alessandro Lambruschini	Italy	7:58.44		7
4	Éric Dubus	France	8:05.84		6
5	Kent Claesson	Sweden	8:07.81		5
6	Sergey Drygin	Russia	8:08.25		4
7	Jukka Savonheimo	Finland	8:08.42		3
8	Gary Lough	Great Britain	8:11.44		2
9	Igor Lishynskyy	Ukraine	8:25.24		1

=== 5000 metres ===
2 June

Rank	Name	Nationality	Time	Notes	Points
1	Gennaro Di Napoli	Italy	13:52.34		9
2	Manuel Pancorbo	Spain	13:55.18		8
3	Abdellah Béhar	France	13:57.15		7
4	Keith Cullen	Great Britain	14:00.61		6
5	Vener Kashayev	Russia	14:06.33		5
6	Sergiy Lebid	Ukraine	14:08.24		4
7	Jonny Danielson	Sweden	14:24.99		3
8	Jirka Arndt	Germany	14:32.70		2
9	Pasi Mattila	Finland	14:46.30		1

=== 110 metres hurdles ===
2 June
Wind: -0.3 m/s

Rank	Name	Nationality	Time	Notes	Points
1	Florian Schwarthoff	Germany	13.20		9
2	Colin Jackson	Great Britain	13.63		8
3	Yevgeniy Pechonkin	Russia	13.64		7
4	Dmytro Kolesnychenko	Ukraine	13.75		6
5	Dan Philibert	France	13.77		5
6	Claes Albihn	Sweden	13.84		4
7	Antti Haapakoski	Finland	13.96		3
8	Mauro Rossi	Italy	14.18		2
9	Miguel de los Santos	Spain	16.11		1

=== 400 metres hurdles ===
1 June

Rank	Name	Nationality	Time	Notes	Points
1	Fabrizio Mori	Italy	49.45		9
2	Jon Ridgeon	Great Britain	49.84		8
3	Sven Nylander	Sweden	50.18		7
4	Jimmy Coco	France	50.27		6
5	Ruslan Mashchenko	Russia	50.54		5
6	Steffen Kolb	Germany	51.08		4
7	Iñigo Monreal	Spain	51.48		3
8	Petteri Pulkkinen	Finland	52.44		2
9	Volodymyr Dobrydnyov	Ukraine	52.88		1

=== 3000 metres steeplechase ===
2 June

Rank	Name	Nationality	Time	Notes	Points
1	Steffen Brand	Germany	8:30.09		9
2	Angelo Carosi	Italy	8:32.50		8
3	Justin Chaston	Great Britain	8:33.59		7
4	Vladimir Pronin	Russia	8:36.38		6
5	Nadir Bosch	France	8:37.20		5
6	Antonio Peula	Spain	8:41.42		4
7	Ville Hautala	Finland	8:45.33		3
8	Oleksiy Patserin	Ukraine	8:48.78		2
9	Patrik Flink	Sweden	9:02.14		1

=== 4 × 100 metres relay ===
1 June

Rank	Nation	Athletes	Time	Note	Points
1	Ukraine	Kostyantyn Rurak, Sergiy Osovych, Oleg Kramarenko, Vladyslav Dologodin	38.53	=NR	9
2	Italy	Giovanni Puggioni, Ezio Madonia, Angelo Cipolloni, Sandro Floris	38.66		8
3	Great Britain	Kevin Williams, Darren Braithwaite, Jason John, Darren Campbell	38.67		7
4	Germany	Holger Blume, Marc Blume, Michael Huke, Christian Konieczny	38.78		6
5	Russia	Pavel Galkin, Aleksandr Sokolov, Andrey Grigoryev, Aleksandr Porkhomovskiy	38.94		5
6	Spain	Frutos Feo, Venancio José, Jordi Mayoral, Francisco Javier Navarro	39.13		4
	Sweden	Patrik Strenius, Torbjörn Eriksson, Lars Hedner, Peter Karlsson	DQ		0
	Finland	Harri Kivela, Sami Lansivuori, Ari Pakarinen, Tero Ridanpaa	DNF		0
	France	Christophe Cheval, Régis Groisard, Pascal Théophile, Sébastien Carrat	DNF		0

=== 4 × 400 metres relay ===
2 June

Rank	Nation	Athletes	Time	Note	Points
1	Great Britain	Mark Richardson, Jamie Baulch, Mark Hylton, Du'aine Ladejo	3:03.38		9
2	Germany	Uwe Jahn, Karsten Just, Kai Karsten, Rico Lieder	3:03.38		8
3	France	Pierre-Marie Hilaire, Marc Foucan, Willy Migerel, Jean-Louis Rapnouil	3:05.05		7
4	Russia	Innokentiy Zharov, Sergey Voronin, Sergey Podrez, Dmitriy Kosov	3:05.05		6
5	Ukraine	Rostyslav Mestechkin, Vadym Ogiy, Roman Galkin, Valentin Kulbatskyy	3:09.46		5
6	Spain	Carlos Velasco, Miguel Cuesta, Luis Flores, Iñigo Monreal	3:09.86		4
7	Sweden	Marko Granat, Mathias Sundin, Jimisola Laursen, Niklas Wallenlind	3:09.91		3
8	Italy	Fabrizio Mori, Ashraf Saber, Marco Vaccari, Andrea Nuti	3:10.69		2
9	Finland	Tommi Hartonen, Petteri Pulkkinen, Mats Lonnqvist, Karl Louramo	3:14.15		1

=== High jump ===
1 June

Rank	Name	Nationality	2.06	2.11	2.15	2.18	2.21	2.24	2.27	2.30	Result	Notes	Points
1	Arturo Ortiz	Spain	–	–	o	–	xo	o	o	xxx	2.27		9
2	Leonid Pumalainen	Russia	–	–	o	–	xxo	o	o	xxx	2.27		8
3	Dalton Grant	Great Britain	–	–	o	o	o	–	xo	xxx	2.27		7
4	Wolfgang Kreißig	Germany	–	–	o	–	o	xo	xo	xxx	2.27		6
5	Alessandro Canale	Italy	–	o	o	o	o	xxo	xxx		2.24		5
6	Joël Vincent	France	–	xo	o	–	o	xxo	xxx		2.24		4
7	Stefan Holm	Sweden	–	o	o	xxo	o	xxx			2.21		3
8	Yuriy Sergiyenko	Ukraine	o	o	o	o	xxo	xxx			2.21		2
9	Vesa Piira	Finland	o	xo	xo	o	xxx				2.18		1

=== Pole vault ===
2 June

Rank	Name	Nationality	5.00	5.15	5.30	5.40	5.50	5.60	5.65	5.70	5.75	5.85	Result	Notes	Points
1	Pyotr Bochkaryov	Russia	–	–	–	–	xo	–	–	xo	–	xxx	5.70		9
2	Tim Lobinger	Germany	–	–	–	o	–	o	–	x–	xx		5.60		8
3	José Manuel Arcos	Spain	–	–	o	–	xxo	xxx					5.50		7
4	Nick Buckfield	Great Britain	–	–	xo	–	xxo	–	xxx				5.50		6
5	Jean Galfione	France	–	–	–	o	–	xxx					5.40		5
6	Peter Widén	Sweden	o	–	–	o	–	xx–	r				5.40		4
7	Heikki Vääräniemi	Finland	–	–	o	–	xxx						5.30		3
8	Claudio Avogaro	Italy	o	xo	xxo	xxx							5.30		2
	Vyacheslav Kalinichenko	Ukraine	xxx										NM		0

=== Long jump ===
1 June

Rank	Name	Nationality	#1	#2	#3	#4	#5	#6	Result	Notes	Points
1	Simone Bianchi	Italy	7.73	x	x	7.83	8.25	7.67	8.25		9
2	Jesús Oliván	Spain	7.83	7.93	x	7.97	x	7.69	7.97		8
3	Bakri Darouèche	France	7.96	7.85	7.87w	7.78	5.29	7.88	7.96		7
4	Kirill Sosunov	Russia	7.65	7.81	7.92	x	x	7.68	7.92		6
5	Mattias Sunneborn	Sweden	7.69	7.52	7.87	7.82	x	7.71	7.87		5
6	Volker Ehmann	Germany	x	7.69	x	7.60	x	7.23	7.69		4
7	Mika Kahma	Finland	7.31w	7.43	7.56	7.22	x	5.45	7.56		3
8	Sergiy Glotov	Ukraine	7.48	7.37	7.52	x	x	x	7.52		2
9	Fred Salle	Great Britain	x	x	7.43	x	x	x	7.43		1

=== Triple jump ===
2 June

Rank	Name	Nationality	#1	#2	#3	#4	#5	#6	Result	Notes	Points
1	Jonathan Edwards	Great Britain	x	x	17.79w	–	x	–	17.79w		9
2	Volodymyr Kravchenko	Ukraine	16.89	x	17.01	x	17.29w	x	17.29w		8
3	Gennadiy Markov	Russia	16.58	17.02	17.05	17.12w	x	17.04	17.12w		7
4	Charles Michael Friedek	Germany	16.30	x	17.03w	16.86w	15.59w	16.51	17.03w		6
5	Raúl Chapado	Spain	16.17	16.32w	x	16.50w	16.52w	16.70w	16.70w		5
6	Claes Rahm	Sweden	16.32	x	x	16.59w	15.99	15.95	16.59w		4
7	Daniele Buttiglione	Italy	15.80	16.06w	16.04w	15.99w	16.12	16.40w	16.40w		3
8	Janne Kinnunen	Finland	15.72	14.96w	16.31w	x	15.75	x	16.31w		2
	Kenny Boudine	France	x	r					NM		0

=== Shot put ===
1 June

Rank	Name	Nationality	#1	#2	#3	#4	#5	#6	Result	Notes	Points
1	Paolo Dal Soglio	Italy	19.49	x	x	20.72	20.01	20.00	20.72		9
2	Oliver-Sven Buder	Germany	19.74	19.51	20.08	19.96	x	x	20.08		8
3	Yuriy Bilonoh	Ukraine	19.86	19.59	19.62	19.62	19.68	19.74	19.86		7
4	Manuel Martínez	Spain	18.91	18.98	x	19.44	19.18	19.54	19.54		6
5	Markus Koistinen	Finland	19.17	19.26	19.40	x	19.32	19.07	19.40		5
6	Shaun Pickering	Great Britain	17.97	18.86	18.72	x	18.84	19.23	19.23		4
7	Aleksey Shidlovskiy	Russia	18.21	x	x	18.23	18.59	x	18.59		3
8	Thomas Hammarsten	Sweden	17.34	18.24	x	18.26	18.42	18.43	18.43		2
9	Jean-Louis Lebon	France	16.96	17.24	17.21	x	17.63	17.76	17.76		1

=== Discus throw ===
2 June

Rank	Name	Nationality	#1	#2	#3	#4	#5	#6	Result	Notes	Points
1	David Martínez	Spain	60.50	x	60.52	x	62.38	x	62.38		9
2	Sergey Lyakhov	Russia	62.20	x	x	x	x	x	62.20		8
3	Jürgen Schult	Germany	59.92	59.94	60.90	x	61.96	61.74	61.96		7
4	Vitaliy Sidorov	Ukraine	61.12	61.50	61.00	60.84	x	61.78	61.78		6
5	Robert Weir	Great Britain	61.02	59.40	x	x	x	59.86	61.02		5
6	Diego Fortuna	Italy	59.08	60.30	58.32	60.62	60.14	x	60.62		4
7	Timo Sinervo	Finland	58.88	x	58.22	57.50	57.46	58.86	58.88		3
8	Jean Pons	France	51.76	56.42	x	57.22	x	58.32	58.32		2
9	Stefan Fernholm	Sweden	55.90	56.84	x	55.00	55.78	55.58	56.84		1

=== Hammer throw ===
2 June

Rank	Name	Nationality	#1	#2	#3	#4	#5	#6	Result	Notes	Points
1	Karsten Kobs	Germany	73.62	76.66	77.22	78.18	x	x	78.18		9
2	Marko Wahlman	Finland	75.14	74.54	76.68	76.58	75.66	77.72	77.72		8
3	Enrico Sgrulletti	Italy	x	77.44	x	76.52	75.20	x	77.44		7
4	Christophe Épalle	France	75.64	76.08	77.16	x	x	76.94	77.16		6
5	Aleksandr Seleznyov	Russia	72.28	75.16	72.36	76.92	x	76.32	76.92		5
6	Tomas Sjöström	Sweden	70.72	67.94	69.86	69.02	72.42	x	72.42		4
7	Artem Rubanko	Ukraine	70.40	68.12	72.30	69.42	71.34	x	72.30		3
8	Mick Jones	Great Britain	69.08	71.48	68.84	71.74	x	68.08	71.74		2
9	José Manuel Pérez	Spain	67.30	65.62	67.02	x	64.50	x	67.30		1

=== Javelin throw ===
1 June

Rank	Name	Nationality	#1	#2	#3	#4	#5	#6	Result	Notes	Points
1	Raymond Hecht	Germany	84.66	x	88.86	–	–	–	88.86		9
2	Sergey Makarov	Russia	80.88	84.44	84.96	x	–	–	84.96		8
3	Harri Hakkarainen	Finland	77.34	78.12	80.56	81.44	x	x	81.44		7
4	Patrik Bodén	Sweden	80.78	x	–	77.70	–	76.74	80.78		6
5	Colin Mackenzie	Great Britain	x	70.64	74.10	x	x	–	74.10		5
6	Gaëtan Siakinuu-Schmidt	France	x	70.94	71.90	70.86	x	72.32	72.32		4
7	Carlos Pérez	Spain	69.80	69.78	x	x	70.70	72.06	72.06		3
8	Fabio De Gaspari	Italy	69.74	71.56	69.94	69.40	69.82	71.40	71.56		2
9	Sergiy Volochay	Ukraine	x	60.84	65.14	63.64	x	61.60	65.14		1

== Women's results ==
=== 100 metres ===
1 June
Wind: +0.3 m/s

Rank	Name	Nationality	Time	Notes	Points
1	Marina Trandenkova	Russia	11.14		8
2	Melanie Paschke	Germany	11.19		7
3	Iryna Pukha	Ukraine	11.25		6
4	Odiah Sidibé	France	11.39		5
5	Nora Ivanova	Bulgaria	11.39		4
6	Natalya Safronnikova	Belarus	11.44		3
7	Simmone Jacobs	Great Britain	11.51		2
8	Cristina Castro	Spain	11.95		1

=== 200 metres ===
2 June
Wind: +1.6 m/s

Rank	Name	Nationality	Time	Notes	Points
1	Marie-José Pérec	France	22.34		8
2	Melanie Paschke	Germany	22.55		7
3	Katharine Merry	Great Britain	22.88		6
4	Monika Gachevska	Bulgaria	22.99		5
5	Natalya Safronnikova	Belarus	23.04		4
6	Sandra Myers	Spain	23.17		3
7	Oksana Dyachenko	Russia	23.43		2
8	Oksana Guskova	Ukraine	24.11		1

=== 400 metres ===
2 June

Rank	Name	Nationality	Time	Notes	Points
1	Grit Breuer	Germany	50.22		8
2	Anna Kozak	Belarus	50.94		7
3	Sandra Myers	Spain	51.10		6
4	Olga Kotlyarova	Russia	51.67		5
5	Tatyana Movchan	Ukraine	52.03		4
6	Marie-Louise Bévis	France	52.07		3
7	Donna Fraser	Great Britain	52.37		2
8	Rositsa Milenova	Bulgaria	55.22		1

=== 800 metres ===
1 June

Rank	Name	Nationality	Time	Notes	Points
1	Svetlana Masterkova	Russia	1:57.87		8
2	Kelly Holmes	Great Britain	1:58.20		7
3	Natalya Dukhnova	Belarus	1:59.70		6
4	Olena Buzhenko	Ukraine	2:00.03		5
5	Patricia Djaté	France	2:00.34		4
6	Linda Kisabaka	Germany	2:00.42		3
7	Ana Amelia Menéndez	Spain	2:01.71		2
8	Petya Strashilova	Bulgaria	2:04.63		1

=== 1500 metres ===
2 June

Rank	Name	Nationality	Time	Notes	Points
1	Olga Churbanova	Russia	4:09.57		8
2	Sylvia Kühnemund	Germany	4:10.22		7
3	Frédérique Quentin	France	4:10.49		6
4	Yelena Bychkovskaya	Belarus	4:12.67		5
5	Olga Zheleva	Bulgaria	4:12.99		4
6	Natalia Chernyshova	Ukraine	4:14.54		3
7	Angela Davies	Great Britain	4:14.66		2
8	Maite Zúñiga	Spain	4:17.26		1

=== 3000 metres ===
2 June

Rank	Name	Nationality	Time	Notes	Points
1	Blandine Bitzner	France	8:59.82		8
2	Petra Wassiluk	Germany	9:02.91		7
3	Marta Domínguez	Spain	9:06.27		6
4	Svetlana Miroshnik	Ukraine	9:08.33		5
5	Sonia McGeorge	Great Britain	9:09.53		4
6	Tatyana Nefedeva	Belarus	9:20.33		3
7	Lidiya Vasilevskaya	Russia	9:23.25		2
8	Evelina Danailova	Bulgaria	9:26.54		1

=== 5000 metres ===
1 June

Rank	Name	Nationality	Time	Notes	Points
1	Kathrin Wessel	Germany	15:40.36		8
2	Julia Vaquero	Spain	15:41.99		7
3	Farida Fatès	France	15:47.72		6
4	Olena Vyazova	Ukraine	15:52.45		5
5	Lyudmila Petrova	Russia	16:11.08		4
6	Natalya Galushko	Belarus	16:18.05		3
7	Andrea Whitcombe	Great Britain	16:41.66		2
8	Radka Naplatanova	Bulgaria	16:42.09		1

=== 100 metres hurdles ===
2 June
Wind: +2.7 m/s

Rank	Name	Nationality	Time	Notes	Points
1	Nadezhda Bodrova	Ukraine	12.89		8
2	Lidiya Yurkova	Belarus	12.99		7
3	Angela Thorp	Great Britain	13.09		6
4	Gabi Roth	Germany	13.09		5
5	Cécile Cinélu	France	13.12		4
6	Marina Azyabina	Russia	13.23		3
7	María José Mardomingo	Spain	13.40		2
8	Iurka Khristova	Bulgaria	13.66		1

=== 400 metres hurdles ===
1 June

Rank	Name	Nationality	Time	Notes	Points
1	Sally Gunnell	Great Britain	56.84		8
2	Silvia Rieger	Germany	57.07		7
3	Nelli Voronkova	Belarus	57.39		6
4	Tetyana Tereshchuk	Ukraine	57.47		5
5	Miriam Alonso	Spain	58.94		4
6	Svetlana Starkova	Russia	59.56		3
7	Carole Nelson	France	59.85		2
8	Eliza Todorova	Bulgaria	1:03.47		1

=== 4 × 100 metres relay ===
1 June

Rank	Nation	Athletes	Time	Note	Points
1	Russia	Natalya Merzlyakova, Galina Malchugina, Marina Trandenkova, Oksana Dyachenko	42.55		8
2	Germany	Andrea Philipp, Melanie Paschke, Silke-Beate Knoll, Silke Lichtenhagen	42.59		7
3	France	Sandra Citte, Odiah Sidibé, Delphine Combe, Marie-José Pérec	43.13		6
4	Ukraine	Oksana Guskova, Viktoriya Fomenko, Irina Slyussar, Iryna Pukha	43.34		5
5	Belarus	Margarita Molchan, Natalya Safronnikova, Natalya Sologub, Yelena Grigorosvska	43.62		4
6	Bulgaria	Desislava Dimitrova, Nora Ivanova, Magdalena Christova, Monika Gachevska	43.76		3
7	Great Britain	Sophia Smith, Paula Thomas, Simmone Jacobs, Catherine Murphy	44.07		2
8	Spain	Carmen Blay, Cristina Castro, María Carmen García-Campero, Patricia Morales	44.48		1

=== 4 × 400 metres relay ===
2 June

Rank	Nation	Athletes	Time	Note	Points
1	Germany	Uta Rohländer, Silke-Beate Knoll, Linda Kisabaka, Grit Breuer	3:26.19		8
2	Ukraine	Viktoriya Fomenko, Lyudmila Koshchey, Olga Moroz, Olena Rurak	3:27.74		7
3	Russia	Tatyana Chebykina, Natalya Sharova, Yuliya Sotnikova, Olga Kotlyarova	3:28.54		6
4	France	Francine Landre, Viviane Dorsile, Marie-France Opheltes, Marie-Louise Bévis	3:28.97		5
5	Great Britain	Donna Fraser, Allison Curbishley, Tracy Joseph, Sally Gunnell	3:31.80		4
6	Belarus	Tatyana Ledovskaya, Natalya Ignatyuk, Nelli Voronokova, Anna Kozak	3:36.24		3
7	Spain	María José Aznar, Esther Lahoz, Mirian Bravo, Lisette Ferri	3:39.51		2
8	Bulgaria	Monika Gachevska, Olga Zheleva, Eliza Todorova, Rositsa Milenova	3:50.45		1

=== High jump ===
2 June

Rank	Name	Nationality	1.77	1.81	1.84	1.87	1.90	1.94	1.98	2.01	Result	Notes	Points
1	Alina Astafei	Germany	–	–	o	–	o	o	xxo	xxx	1.98		8
2	Stefka Kostadinova	Bulgaria	–	–	o	–	o	o	xxx		1.94		7
3	Yelena Topchina	Russia	–	o	o	o	xo	xxx			1.90		6
4	Isabelle Jeanne	France	o	o	o	o	xxx				1.87		4
4	Tatyana Khramova	Belarus	–	o	o	o	xxx				1.87		4
4	Iryna Mykhalchenko	Ukraine	o	o	o	o	xxx				1.87		4
7	Lea Haggett	Great Britain	–	o	o	xxx					1.84		2
8	Carlota Castrejana	Spain	o	o	xxx						1.81		1

=== Long jump ===
2 June

Rank	Name	Nationality	#1	#2	#3	#4	#5	#6	Result	Notes	Points
1	Iva Prandzheva	Bulgaria	6.48	6.84	x	6.72	6.80	6.76	6.84		8
2	Yelena Sinchukova	Russia	x	6.77	6.81	6.75	x	6.81	6.81		7
3	Claudia Gerhardt	Germany	x	6.76	x	x	x	x	6.76		6
4	Denise Lewis	Great Britain	6.47	6.66	x	x	–	6.50	6.66		5
5	Olena Khlopotnova	Ukraine	6.64w	6.44	6.37	6.40	x	6.55	6.64w		4
6	Larisa Kuchinskaya	Belarus	5.90	x	5.70	6.21	6.44	6.33	6.44		3
7	Nadine Caster	France	x	6.17	5.17	6.36	6.27	x	6.36		2
8	Inma Clopes	Spain	5.75w	6.00	x	x	x	5.85	6.00		1

=== Triple jump ===
1 June

Rank	Name	Nationality	#1	#2	#3	#4	#5	#6	Result	Notes	Points
1	Ashia Hansen	Great Britain	14.56w	14.27	14.13	–	14.47w	14.57	14.57	CR	8
2	Olena Govorova	Ukraine	14.42	14.30	14.34	x	14.27	14.02	14.42		7
3	Lyudmila Dubkova	Russia	x	14.03	13.06	x	13.81w	14.14	14.14		6
4	Petra Lobinger	Germany	x	x	14.05	14.13	x	x	14.13		5
5	Zhanna Gureyeva	Belarus	12.15	13.47	13.57	13.74	13.53	x	13.74		4
6	Concepción Paredes	Spain	x	x	x	13.74	13.37	13.54	13.74		3
7	Iva Prandzheva	Bulgaria	13.54	x	x	13.55	x	13.60	13.60		2
8	Sylvie Borda	France	13.00	13.49	12.82	x	13.06	13.01	13.49		1

=== Shot put ===
2 June

Rank	Name	Nationality	#1	#2	#3	#4	#5	#6	Result	Notes	Points
1	Astrid Kumbernuss	Germany	20.05	20.00	19.98	–	–	–	20.05		8
2	Judith Oakes	Great Britain	18.03	18.59	18.78	18.70	19.00	x	19.00		7
3	Svetlana Krivelyova	Russia	17.70	17.34	x	17.32	17.62	17.62	17.70		6
4	Margarita Ramos	Spain	15.49	17.30	x	x	16.92	16.81	17.30		5
5	Tatyana Khorkhuleva	Belarus	x	17.02	16.81	16.58	x	x	17.02		4
6	Valentina Fedyushina	Ukraine	15.90	16.59	16.90	x	x	16.44	16.90		3
7	Laurence Manfredi	France	15.92	16.48	16.53	x	x	16.52	16.53		2
8	Atanaska Angelova	Bulgaria	15.64	15.37	15.27	x	x	x	15.64		1

=== Discus throw ===
1 June

Rank	Name	Nationality	#1	#2	#3	#4	#5	#6	Result	Notes	Points
1	Ilke Wyludda	Germany	63.52	64.04	64.86	65.66	x	62.26	65.66		8
2	Olga Chernyavskaya	Russia	62.16	61.16	65.06	62.94	x	x	65.06		7
3	Irina Yatchenko	Belarus	60.52	59.78	x	60.68	60.34	x	60.68		6
4	Isabelle Devaluez	France	57.38	x	57.80	55.86	54.90	57.00	57.80		5
5	Atanaska Angelova	Bulgaria	55.28	x	x	57.16	x	x	57.16		4
6	Viktoriya Boyko	Ukraine	55.36	x	x	53.58	x	53.28	55.36		3
7	Ángeles Barreiro	Spain	x	x	51.10	x	x	x	51.10		2
8	Debbie Callaway	Great Britain	50.86	49.92	x	x	50.06	x	50.86		1

=== Javelin throw ===
2 June – Old model

Rank	Name	Nationality	#1	#2	#3	#4	#5	#6	Result	Notes	Points
1	Oksana Ovchinnikova	Russia	65.72	62.42	63.00	x	–	–	65.72		8
2	Natalya Shikolenko	Belarus	58.30	56.36	62.52	x	x	x	62.52		7
3	Tanja Damaske	Germany	58.80	x	x	x	57.90	x	58.80		6
4	Tessa Sanderson	Great Britain	x	58.18	x	x	57.52	x	58.80		5
5	Nadine Auzeil	France	x	57.28	x	x	x	56.78	57.28		4
6	Olha Ivankova	Ukraine	x	54.34	53.04	x	57.12	57.18	57.18		3
7	Marta Míguez	Spain	50.52	x	x	48.84	x	x	50.52		2
8	Iurka Khristova	Bulgaria	31.92	35.98	35.94	36.52	–	–	36.52		1
