= Athletics at the 1997 Mediterranean Games =

1997 Athletics at the Mediterranean Games

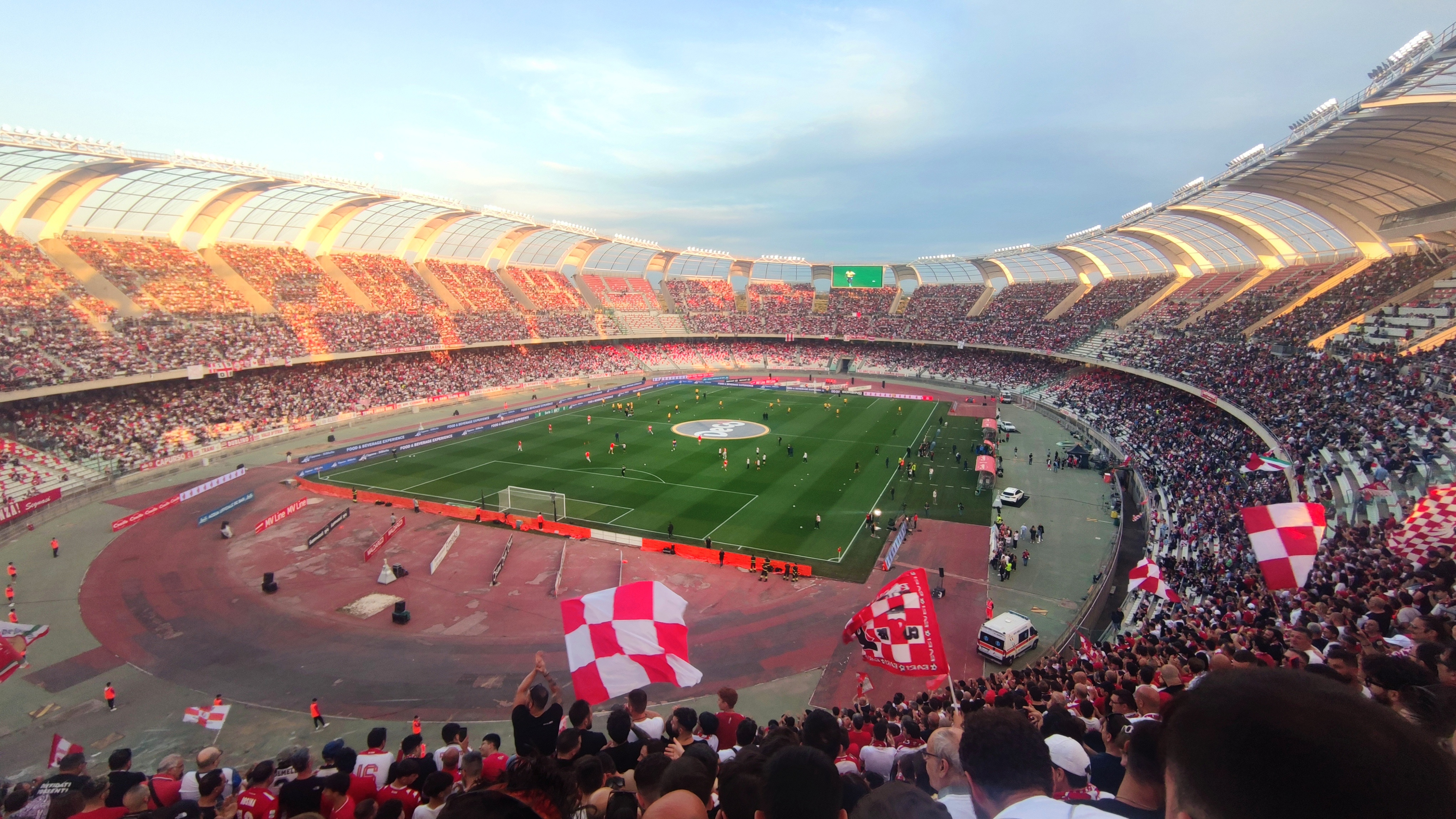
- The athletics stadium was the Games main stadium
- Dates: 15–19 June
- Host city: Bari, Italy
- Venue: Stadio San Nicola
- Records set: 24

At the 1997 Mediterranean Games, the athletics events were held at the Stadio San Nicola in Bari, Italy from 15–19 June 1997. A total of forty-three events were contested, of which 23 by male and 20 by female athletes. A total of 24 Games records were broken or equalled during the competition.

The host country, Italy, topped the medal table with twelve gold medals and a total haul of 36 medals – by far the largest. France was the second most successful nation with ten golds and 23 medals, while Greece with seven golds and 19 overall. Morocco, Algeria, Spain and Slovenia also featured prominently on the podiums. Fourteen nations had medal winning athletes in the competition.

Greece won both the 100 metres titles through Angelos Pavlakakis and Ekaterini Thanou, both of whom ran meet record times. Christine Arron won the women's 200 metres and 4×100 metres relay for France. Morocco's Nezha Bidouane took the women's 400 metres hurdles title, an event in which she would later win at the 1997 World Championships.

== Medal table ==
* Host nation (Italy)

Rank	Nation	Gold	Silver	Bronze	Total
1	Italy*	12	13	11	36
2	France	10	6	7	23
3	Greece	7	9	3	19
4	Morocco	5	4	3	12
5	Algeria	3	0	3	6
6	Slovenia	2	2	3	7
7	Spain	1	5	6	12
8	FR Yugoslavia	1	0	1	2
8	Turkey	1	0	1	2
10	Syria	1	0	0	1
11	Cyprus	0	2	2	4
12	Croatia	0	1	1	2
13	Malta	0	1	0	1
14	Tunisia	0	0	2	2
Totals (14 entries)		43	43	43	129

== Medal summary ==
=== Men ===
Event	Gold		Silver		Bronze	
100 metres	Angelos Pavlakakis (GRE)	10.13 GR	Anninos Marcoullides (CYP)	10.23	Stéphane Cali (FRA)	10.28
200 metres	Giovanni Puggioni (ITA)	20.44 GR	Georgios Panagiotopoulos (GRE)	20.53	Prodromos Katsantonis (CYP)	20.55
400 metres	Jean-Louis Rapnouil (FRA)	45.58	Marco Vaccari (ITA)	45.74	Samir-Adel Louahla (ALG)	46.07
800 metres	Giuseppe D'Urso (ITA)	1:47.10	Andrea Longo (ITA)	1:47.54	Djabir Saïd-Guerni (ALG)	1:47.76
1500 metres	Driss Maazouzi (MAR)	3:44.77	Branko Zorko (CRO)	3:45.17	Reyes Estévez (ESP)	3:45.40
5000 metres	Alberto García (ESP)	13:25.29 GR	El Hassan Lahssini (MAR)	13:28.95	Saïd Berioui (MAR)	13:53.98
10,000 metres	Ismaïl Sghyr (MAR)	28:05.74 GR	Abderrahim Zitouna (MAR)	28:19.85	Kamel Kohil (ALG)	28:24.19
110 metres hurdles	Vincent Clarico (FRA)	13.61	Mauro Re (ITA)	13.71	Emiliano Pizzoli (ITA)	13.72
400 metres hurdles	Zid Abou Hamed (SYR)	49.25	Laurent Ottoz (ITA)	49.27	Miro Kocuvan (SLO)	49.43
3000 metres steeplechase	Brahim Boulami (MAR)	8:18.80 GR	Hicham Bouaouiche (MAR)	8:20.30	Giuseppe Maffei (ITA)	8:23.43
4×100 metres relay	Italy (ITA); Nicola Asumi; Giovanni Puggioni; Angelo Cipolloni; Sandro Floris	38.61 GR	Spain (ESP); Frutos Feo; Venancio José; Jordi Mayoral; Francisco Javier Navarro	38.85	Cyprus (CYP); Georgios Skender; Anninos Marcoullides; Prodromos Katsantonis; Yiannis Zisimides	39.12
4×400 metres relay	Algeria (ALG); Samir-Adel Louahla; Kamel Talhaoui; Ahmed Aichaoui; Malik Louahla	3:02.78 GR	France (FRA); Pierre-Marie Hilaire; Rodrigue Nordin; Jimmy Coco; Fred Mango	3:02.84	Italy (ITA); Michele Grando; Fabrizio Mori; Walter Groff; Ashraf Saber	3:03.08
Marathon	Azzedine Sakhri (ALG)	2:20:40	Giovanni Ruggiero (ITA)	2:21:08	Mustapha Damaoui (MAR)	2:21:32
20 km walk	Giovanni De Benedictis (ITA)	1:24:59	Michele Didoni (ITA)	1:25:21	Hatem Ghoula (TUN)	1:25:36
High jump	Stevan Zorić (YUG)	2.28 m GR=	Arturo Ortíz (ESP); Ignacio Pérez (ESP)	2.26 m	Not awarded	
Pole vault	Alain Andji (FRA)	5.70 m GR	Juan Gabriel Concepción (ESP)	5.50 m	Andrea Giannini (ITA)	5.50 m
Long jump	Gregor Cankar (SLO)	8.00 m	Konstandinos Koukodimos (GRE)	7.95 m	Dimitros Hatzopoulos (GRE)	7.92 m
Triple jump	Paolo Camossi (ITA)	16.63 m	Hristos Meletoglou (GRE)	16.50 m	Germain Martial (FRA)	16.18 m
Shot put	Alessandro Andrei (ITA)	19.54 m	Corrado Fantini (ITA)	19.19 m	Stevimir Ercegovac (CRO)	19.00 m
Discus throw	Igor Primc (SLO)	61.66 m	Diego Fortuna (ITA)	59.90 m	Simone Sbrogiò (ITA)	59.20 m
Hammer throw	Christophe Épalle (FRA)	78.44 m GR	Raphaël Piolanti (FRA)	77.20 m	Enrico Sgrulletti (ITA)	76.32 m
Javelin throw	Konstadinos Gatsioudis (GRE)	89.22 m GR	Dimitrios Polymerou (GRE)	77.88 m	Maher Ridane (TUN)	77.10 m
Decathlon	Pierre-Alexandre Vial (FRA)	8070 pts GR	Beniamino Poserina (ITA)	7991 pts	Prodromos Korkizoglou (GRE)	7932 pts

=== Women ===
Event	Gold		Silver		Bronze	
100 metres	Ekaterini Thanou (GRE)	11.13 GR	Frédérique Bangué (FRA)	11.22	Sylviane Félix (FRA)	11.27
200 metres	Christine Arron (FRA)	22.62 GR	Ekaterini Koffa (GRE)	22.80	Alenka Bikar (SLO)	22.95
400 metres	Virna De Angeli (ITA)	51.31 GR	Dora Kyriakou (CYP)	52.02	Patrizia Spuri (ITA)	52.57
800 metres	Hasna Benhassi (MAR)	2:03.70	Jolanda Steblovnik (SLO)	2:03.71	Séverine Foulon (FRA)	2:04.24
1500 metres	Nouria Mérah-Benida (ALG)	4:11.27	Samira Raïf (MAR)	4:11.60	Maite Zúñiga (ESP)	4:11.63
5000 metres	Roberta Brunet (ITA)	15:00.69 GR	Julia Vaquero (ESP)	15:04.48	Zahra Ouaziz (MAR)	15:30.19
10,000 metres	Hrisostomia Iakovou (GRE)	32:34.87 GR	Silvia Sommaggio (ITA)	32:41.79	Olivera Jevtić (YUG)	32:43.42
100 metres hurdles	Patricia Girard (FRA)	12.90	Brigita Bukovec (SLO)	13.01	Carla Tuzzi (ITA)	13.30
400 metres hurdles	Nezha Bidouane (MAR)	55.01 GR	Miriam Alonso (ESP)	55.89	Carla Barbarino (ITA)	56.76
4×100 metres relay	France (FRA); Frédérique Bangué; Christine Arron; Patricia Girard; Sylviane Félix	42.63 GR	Greece (GRE); Maria Tsoni; Ekaterini Koffa; Marina Vasarmidou; Ekaterini Thanou	43.07	Italy (ITA); Stefania Ferrante; Annarita Luciano; Giada Gallina; Manuela Levorato	44.15
4×400 metres relay	Italy (ITA); Carla Barbarino; Francesca Cola; Patrizia Spuri; Francesca Carbone	3:29.98 GR	France (FRA); Marie-Louise Bévis; Sophie Domenech; Marie-Line Scholent; Elsa Devassoigne	3:30.62	Spain (ESP); Miriam Alonso; Esther Lahoz; Miriam Bravo; Yolanda Reyes	3:31.93
Marathon	Serap Aktaş (TUR)	2:39:22	Carol Galea (MLT)	2:43:53	Lale Öztürk (TUR)	2:46:56
10 km walk	Elisabetta Perrone (ITA)	44:40 GR	Annarita Sidoti (ITA)	45:35	Celia Marcén (ESP)	46:07
High jump	Antonella Bevilacqua (ITA)	1.95 m	Niki Bakoyianni (GRE)	1.93 m	Britta Bilač (SLO)	1.91 m
Long jump	Niki Xanthou (GRE)	6.72 m GR	Linda Ferga (FRA)	6.49 m	Anastasia Mahob (FRA)	6.47 m
Triple jump	Olga Vasdeki (GRE)	14.13 m GR	Betty Lise (FRA)	13.81 m	Antonella Capriotti (ITA)	13.80 m
Shot put	Mara Rosolen (ITA)	17.82 m	Eleni Tsentemeidou (GRE)	17.70 m	Margarita Ramos (ESP)	17.42 m
Discus throw	Anastasia Kelesidou (GRE)	66.18 m GR	Styliani Tsikouna (GRE)	61.96 m	Isabelle Devaluez (FRA)	61.28 m
Javelin throw (Old javelin model)	Nadine Auzeil (FRA)	57.32 m	Claudia Coslovich (ITA)	57.16 m	Aggeliki Tsiolakoudi (GRE)	56.70 m
Heptathlon	Nathalie Teppe (FRA)	6161 pts	Gertrud Bacher (ITA)	5859 pts	Marie Collonvillé (FRA)	5839 pts

== Participation ==
- Albania
- Algeria
- Bosnia and Herzegovina
- Croatia
- Cyprus
- Egypt
- France
- Greece
- Italy
- Libya
- Malta
- Monaco
- Morocco
- Slovenia
- Spain
- Syria
- Tunisia
- Turkey
- Federal Republic of Yugoslavia

== Men's results ==
=== 100 meters ===
Heats – 16 June
Wind: Heat 1: +0.5 m/s, Heat 2: +1.0 m/s, Heat 3: +0.6 m/s

Rank	Heat	Name	Nationality	Time	Notes
1	1	Stéphane Cali	France	10.27	Q
1	2	Angelos Pavlakakis	Greece	10.30	Q
1	3	Anninos Marcoullides	Cyprus	10.36	Q
2	1	Nicola Asuni	Italy	10.40	Q
2	3	Frutos Feo	Spain	10.40	Q
3	1	Venancio José	Spain	10.48	q
3	3	Andrea Colombo	Italy	10.55	
?	?	Sokol Shepeteja	Albania	10.72	

Final – 16 June
Wind: +0.4 m/s

Rank	Lane	Name	Nationality	Time	Notes
1st place, gold medalist(s)	5	Angelos Pavlakakis	Greece	10.13	GR, NR
2nd place, silver medalist(s)	6	Anninos Marcoullides	Cyprus	10.23	
3rd place, bronze medalist(s)	4	Stéphane Cali	France	10.28	
4	2	Georgios Skender	Cyprus	10.41	
5	3	Nicola Asuni	Italy	10.43	
6	7	Venancio José	Spain	10.45	
7	8	Frutos Feo	Spain	10.48	
8	1	Pascal Théophile	France	10.52	

=== 200 meters ===
Heats – 17 June
Wind: Heat 1: -0.7 m/s, Heat 2: 0.0 m/s

Rank	Heat	Name	Nationality	Time	Notes
1	1	Georgios Panagiotopoulos	Greece	20.77	Q
1	2	Giovanni Puggioni	Italy	20.85	Q
2	1	Carlo Occhiena	Italy	20.93	Q
4	1	Jordi Mayoral	Spain	21.11	q
5	2	Francisco Navarro	Spain	21.19	

Final – 17 June
Wind: +1.3 m/s

Rank	Lane	Name	Nationality	Time	Notes
1st place, gold medalist(s)	5	Giovanni Puggioni	Italy	20.44	GR
2nd place, silver medalist(s)	3	Georgios Panagiotopoulos	Greece	20.53	
3rd place, bronze medalist(s)	7	Prodromos Katsantonis	Cyprus	20.55	
4	4	Alexandros Terzian	Greece	20.67	
5	1	Christophe Cheval	France	20.87	
6	8	Jordi Mayoral	Spain	20.88	
7	2	Anninos Marcoullides	Cyprus	20.94	
	6	Carlo Occhiena	Italy	DNS	

=== 400 meters ===
Heats – 16 June

Rank	Heat	Name	Nationality	Time	Notes
1	3	Jean-Louis Rapnouil	France	45.64	Q
2	3	Samir-Adel Louahla	Algeria	46.05	Q
1	2	Fred Mango	France	46.44	Q
1	1	Marco Vaccari	Italy	46.47	Q
2	1	Antonio Andrés	Spain	46.80	Q
2	2	Kamel Talhaoui	Algeria	46.84	Q
4	3	Michele Grando	Italy	47.04	
4	2	César Martínez	Spain	47.22	
4	1	Matija Šestak	Slovenia	47.33	
5	1	Ercan Sunu	Turkey	47.39	

Final – 17 June

Rank	Lane	Name	Nationality	Time	Notes
1st place, gold medalist(s)	3	Jean-Louis Rapnouil	France	45.58	
2nd place, silver medalist(s)	4	Marco Vaccari	Italy	45.74	
3rd place, bronze medalist(s)	5	Samir-Adel Louahla	Algeria	46.07	
4	6	Fred Mango	France	46.69	
5	1	Panagiotis Sarris	Greece	46.80	
6	8	Slobodan Branković	FR Yugoslavia	46.82	
7	7	Kamel Talhaoui	Algeria	46.95	
8	2	Antonio Andrés	Spain	46.97	

=== 800 meters ===
Heats – 16 June

Rank	Heat	Name	Nationality	Time	Notes
1	2	Benyounés Lahlou	Morocco	1:46.27	Q
2	2	Andrea Longo	Italy	1:46.56	Q
3	2	Panagiotis Stroumbakos	Greece	1:46.81	Q
1	1	Giuseppe D'Urso	Italy	1:48.80	Q
?	?	Djabir Saïd-Guerni	Algeria	1:47.33	
5	2	José Antonio Redolat	Spain	1:47.42	q
6	2	Dalibor Balgač	Croatia	1:47.46	
3	1	Pedro Antonio Esteso	Spain	1:49.05	Q
4	1	Mahmoud Al-Kheirat	Syria	1:49.18	

Final – 17 June

Rank	Name	Nationality	Time	Notes
1st place, gold medalist(s)	Giuseppe D'Urso	Italy	1:47.10	
2nd place, silver medalist(s)	Andrea Longo	Italy	1:47.54	
3rd place, bronze medalist(s)	Djabir Saïd-Guerni	Algeria	1:47.76	
4	Benyounés Lahlou	Morocco	1:47.83	
5	Adem Hecini	Algeria	1:48.24	
6	Panagiotis Stroumbakos	Greece	1:48.31	
7	José Antonio Redolat	Spain	1:48.49	
8	Pedro Antonio Esteso	Spain	1:48.62	

=== 1500 meters ===
18 June

Rank	Name	Nationality	Time	Notes
1st place, gold medalist(s)	Driss Maazouzi	Morocco	3:44.77	
2nd place, silver medalist(s)	Branko Zorko	Croatia	3:45.17	
3rd place, bronze medalist(s)	Reyes Estévez	Spain	3:45.40	
4	Carlos García	Spain	3:45.96	
5	Abdelhak Abdellah	Morocco	3:45.99	
6	Ali Hakimi	Tunisia	3:46.11	
7	Mickaël Damian	France	3:46.16	
8	Massimo Pegoretti	Italy	3:46.67	
	Andrea Giocondi	Italy	DNF	

=== 5000 meters ===
16 June

Rank	Name	Nationality	Time	Notes
1st place, gold medalist(s)	Alberto García	Spain	13:25.29	GR
2nd place, silver medalist(s)	El Hassan Lahssini	Morocco	13:28.95	
3rd place, bronze medalist(s)	Saïd Berioui	Morocco	13:53.98	
4	Dragoslav Prpa	FR Yugoslavia	14:00.89	
5	Mehdi Khelifi	Tunisia	14:00.96	
6	Ali Mabruk Ezzayedi	Libya	14:03.76	
7	Zeki Öztürk	Turkey	14:04.01	
8	Mahieddine Belhadj	Algeria	14:04.06	
9	Marco Antonio Rufo	Spain	14:07.51	
	Umberto Pusterla	Italy	DNF	

=== 10,000 meters ===
18 June

Rank	Name	Nationality	Time	Notes
1st place, gold medalist(s)	Ismaïl Sghyr	Morocco	28:05.74	GR
2nd place, silver medalist(s)	Abderrahim Zitouna	Morocco	28:19.85	
3rd place, bronze medalist(s)	Kamel Kohil	Algeria	28:24.19	
4	Rachid Berradi	Italy	28:33.31	
5	Simone Zanon	Italy	29:47.34	
6	Fatih Çintimar	Turkey	30:30.86	
	Zeki Öztürk	Turkey	DNF	
	Spyridon Andriopoulos	Greece	DNF	

=== Marathon ===
15 June

Rank	Name	Nationality	Time	Notes
1st place, gold medalist(s)	Azzedine Sakhri	Algeria	2:20:40	
2nd place, silver medalist(s)	Giovanni Ruggiero	Italy	2:21:08	
3rd place, bronze medalist(s)	Mustapha Damaoui	Morocco	2:21:32	
4	Cihangir Demirel	Turkey	2:23:04	
5	Haydar Doğan	Turkey	2:27:30	
6	Nikolaos Polias	Greece	2:30:56	
7	Adel Mohamed Adili	Libya	2:34.02	
	Sid-Ali Sakhri	Algeria	DNF	
	Roman Kejžar	Slovenia	DNF	
	Massimiliano Ingrami	Italy	DNF	

=== 110 meters hurdles ===
Heats – 17 June
Wind: Heat 1: -0.9 m/s, Heat 2: -0.6 m/s

Rank	Heat	Name	Nationality	Time	Notes
1	2	Vincent Clarico	France	13.74	Q
1	1	Emiliano Pizzoli	Italy	13.88	Q
2	2	Mauro Re	Italy	13.97	Q
	?	Sébastien Thibault	France	DNF	

Final – 17 June
Wind: +0.7 m/s

Rank	Lane	Name	Nationality	Time	Notes
1st place, gold medalist(s)	6	Vincent Clarico	France	13.61	
2nd place, silver medalist(s)	4	Mauro Re	Italy	13.71	
3rd place, bronze medalist(s)	5	Emiliano Pizzoli	Italy	13.72	
4	1	Mohamed Boukrouna	Morocco	14.15	
5	7	Mohamed Abdel Aal	Egypt	14.31	
6	8	Zoran Miljuš	Croatia	14.45	
7	2	Besnik Bala	Albania	15.75	

=== 400 meters hurdles ===
Heats – 17 June

Rank	Heat	Name	Nationality	Time	Notes
1	1	Laurent Ottoz	Italy	49.67	Q
?	?	Miro Kocuvan	Slovenia	49.97	Q
1	2	Zeid Abou Hamed	Syria	50.17	Q
?	?	Siniša Peša	FR Yugoslavia	50.28	
?	?	Pascal Maran	France	50.65	
4	2	Óscar Pitillas	Spain	50.68	q

Final – 17 June

Rank	Lane	Name	Nationality	Time	Notes
1st place, gold medalist(s)	5	Zeid Abou Hamed	Syria	49.25	
2nd place, silver medalist(s)	3	Laurent Ottoz	Italy	49.27	
3rd place, bronze medalist(s)	6	Miro Kocuvan	Slovenia	49.43	PB
4	1	Jimmy Coco	France	49.53	
5	4	Siniša Peša	FR Yugoslavia	50.45	
6	2	Óscar Pitillas	Spain	50.77	
7	8	Walid Ketite	Algeria	51.30	
	7	Pascal Maran	France	DNF	

=== 3000 meters steeplechase ===
16 June

Rank	Name	Nationality	Time	Notes
1st place, gold medalist(s)	Brahim Boulami	Morocco	8:18.80	GR
2nd place, silver medalist(s)	Hicham Bouaouiche	Morocco	8:20.30	
3rd place, bronze medalist(s)	Giuseppe Maffei	Italy	8:23.43	
4	Stathis Stasi	Cyprus	8:26.83	
5	José González	Spain	8:28.75	
6	Eliseo Martín	Spain	8:37.95	
7	Georgios Giannelis	Greece	9:01.78	

=== 4 x 100 meters relay ===
18 June

Rank	Lane	Nation	Competitors	Time	Notes
1st place, gold medalist(s)	4	Italy	Nicola Asuni, Giovanni Puggioni, Angelo Cipolloni, Sandro Floris	38.61	GR
2nd place, silver medalist(s)	5	Spain	Frutos Feo, Venancio José, Jordi Mayoral, Javier Navarro	38.85	=NR
3rd place, bronze medalist(s)	2	Cyprus	Georgios Skender, Anninos Marcoullides, Prodromos Katsantonis, Yiannis Zisimides	39.12	NR
4	3	France	Christophe Cheval, Pascal Théophile, Éric Perrot, David Patros	39.84	
	6	Greece	Angelos Pavlakakis, Georgios Panagiotopoulos, Ioannis Nafpliotis, Alexandros Terzian	DQ	

=== 4 x 400 meters relay ===
18 June

Rank	Nation	Competitors	Time	Notes
1st place, gold medalist(s)	Algeria	Samir-Adel Louahla, Kamel Talhaoui, Ahmed Aichaoui, Malik Louahla	3:02.78	GR, NR
2nd place, silver medalist(s)	France	Pierre-Marie Hilaire, Rodrigue Nordin, Jimmy Coco, Fred Mango	3:02.84	
3rd place, bronze medalist(s)	Italy	Michele Grando, Fabrizio Mori, Walter Groff, Ashraf Saber	3:03.08	
4	Spain	César Martínez, Iñigo Monreal, Ion Lopetegui, Antonio Andrés	3:04.73	
5	FR Yugoslavia	Aleksandar Popović, Branislav Stojanović, Siniša Peša, Slobodan Branković	3:06.62	

=== 20 kilometers walk ===
Rank	Name	Nationality	Time	Notes
1st place, gold medalist(s)	Giovanni De Benedictis	Italy	1:24:59	
2nd place, silver medalist(s)	Michele Didoni	Italy	1:25:21	
3rd place, bronze medalist(s)	Hatem Ghoula	Tunisia	1:25:36	
4	Denis Langlois	France	1:25:46	
5	Aleksandar Raković	FR Yugoslavia	1:28:40	
6	Juan Antonio Porras	Spain	1:32:12	
7	Spyridon Kastanis	Greece	1:33:53	
8	David Márquez	Spain	1:34:37	
	Jean-Olivier Brosseau	France	DQ	

=== High jump ===
18 June

Rank	Name	Nationality	2.15	2.18	2.21	2.24	2.26	2.28	2.30	Result	Notes
1st place, gold medalist(s)	Stevan Zorić	FR Yugoslavia								2.28	=GR
2nd place, silver medalist(s)	Arturo Ortiz	Spain	–	o	–	xo	xo	–	xxx	2.26	
2nd place, silver medalist(s)	Ignacio Pérez	Spain	o	–	xo	–	xo	xxx		2.26	
4	Dimitrios Kokotis	Greece								2.24	
5	Joël Vincent	France								2.21	
6	Ioannis Giantsios	Greece								2.21	
7	Dejan Miloševič	Slovenia								2.18	
8	Elvir Krehmić	Bosnia and Herzegovina								2.15	

=== Pole vault ===
16 June

Rank	Name	Nationality	5.00	5.20	5.30	5.50	5.60	5.70	Result	Notes
1st place, gold medalist(s)	Alain Andji	France							5.70	GR
2nd place, silver medalist(s)	Juan Gabriel Concepción	Spain	o	–	o	o	xxx		5.50	
3rd place, bronze medalist(s)	Andrea Giannini	Italy							5.50	
4	Sébastien Levicq	France							5.30	
5	Montxu Miranda	Spain	o	–	o	xxx			5.30	
6	Konstantinos Tzivas	Greece							5.20	
7	Christos Pallakis	Greece							5.20	
8	Jurij Rovan	Slovenia							5.00	

=== Long jump ===
Qualification – 17 June

Rank	Group	Name	Nationality	#1	#2	#3	Result	Notes
1	A	Younès Moudrik	Morocco				7.77	
1	B	Anis Gallali	Tunisia				7.77	
?	?	Kader Klouchi	France				7.66	
?	?	Nicola Trentin	Italy				7.53	
?	?	Milko Campus	Italy				7.36	
7	A	José Antonio Giralde	Spain	7.35	7.29	7.32	7.35	

Final – 18 June

Rank	Name	Nationality	Result	Notes
1st place, gold medalist(s)	Gregor Cankar	Slovenia	8.00	
2nd place, silver medalist(s)	Konstandinos Koukodimos	Greece	7.95	
3rd place, bronze medalist(s)	Dimitrios Hatzopoulos	Greece	7.92	
4	Younès Moudrik	Morocco	7.89	
5	Marko Rajić	FR Yugoslavia	7.75	
6	Siniša Ergotić	Croatia	7.74	
7	Nicola Trentin	Italy	7.71	
8	Anis Gallali	Tunisia	7.71	
9	Emmanuel Bangué	France	7.70	
10	Hatem Mersal	Egypt	7.66	
11	Kader Klouchi	France	7.65	

=== Triple jump ===
16 June

Rank	Name	Nationality	#1	#2	#3	#4	#5	#6	Result	Notes
1st place, gold medalist(s)	Paolo Camossi	Italy							16.63	
2nd place, silver medalist(s)	Hristos Meletoglou	Greece							16.50	
3rd place, bronze medalist(s)	Germain Martial	France							16.18	
4	Álvaro Bartolomé	Spain	x	x	x	15.27	15.88	x	15.88	
5	Murat Ayaydın	Turkey							15.84	
6	Stamatios Lenis	Greece							15.71	

=== Shot put ===
16 June

Rank	Name	Nationality	#1	#2	#3	#4	#5	#6	Result	Notes
1st place, gold medalist(s)	Alessandro Andrei	Italy	19.21	x	19.15	19.44	19.45	19.54	19.54	
2nd place, silver medalist(s)	Corrado Fantini	Italy							19.19	
3rd place, bronze medalist(s)	Stevimir Ercegovac	Croatia							19.00	
4	José Luis Martínez	Spain	18.80	x	18.60	x	18.44	18.36	18.80	
5	Alexios Leonidis	Greece							18.71	
6	Carlos Gerones	Spain	17.72	18.12	18.03	x	x	x	18.12	
7	Stéphane Vial	France							18.00	
8	Ekrem Ay	Turkey							16.90	

=== Discus throw ===
17 June

Rank	Name	Nationality	#1	#2	#3	#4	#5	#6	Result	Notes
1st place, gold medalist(s)	Igor Primc	Slovenia	60.62	58.00	60.84	60.74	60.98	61.66	61.66	
2nd place, silver medalist(s)	Diego Fortuna	Italy							59.90	
3rd place, bronze medalist(s)	Simone Sbrogiò	Italy							59.20	
4	Christos Papadopoulos	Greece							58.88	
5	Jean Pons	France							57.90	
6	Dragan Mustapić	Croatia							57.04	
7	José Luis Valencia	Spain	x	55.36	x	54.70	55.98	x	55.98	
8	Ercüment Olgundeniz	Turkey							55.78	
	Abraham Delgado	Spain	x	x	x				NM	

=== Hammer throw ===
16 June

Rank	Name	Nationality	#1	#2	#3	#4	#5	#6	Result	Notes
1st place, gold medalist(s)	Christophe Épalle	France	75.76	78.44					78.44	GR
2nd place, silver medalist(s)	Raphaël Piolanti	France							77.20	
3rd place, bronze medalist(s)	Enrico Sgrulletti	Italy							76.32	
4	Alexandros Papadimitriou	Greece							75.70	
5	Nicola Vizzoni	Italy							74.96	
6	Hristos Polihroniou	Greece							74.14	
7	Cherif El Hennawi	Egypt							69.76	
8	Hakim Toumi	Algeria							69.14	
10	Anscari Salgado	Spain	63.42	64.22	x				64.22	
12	Moisés Campeny	Spain	x	59.30	x				59.30	

=== Javelin throw ===
16 June

Rank	Name	Nationality	#1	#2	#3	#4	#5	#6	Result	Notes
1st place, gold medalist(s)	Konstadinos Gatsioudis	Greece	80.94	83.78	x	84.70	x	89.22	89.22	GR
2nd place, silver medalist(s)	Dimitrios Polymerou	Greece							77.88	
3rd place, bronze medalist(s)	Maher Ridane	Tunisia							77.10	
4	David Brisseault	France							74.66	
5	Fabio De Gaspari	Italy							73.92	
6	Raimundo Fernández	Spain	68.02	68.84	73.02	x	70.34	x	73.02	
7	Ivan Soffiato	Italy							72.00	
8	Firas Al-Mahamid	Syria							69.82	

=== Decathlon ===
16–17 June

The highest mark recorded in each event is highlighted in yellow

Rank	Name	Nationality	100m	LJ	SP	HJ	400m	110m H	DT	PV	JT	1500m	Points	Notes
1st place, gold medalist(s)	Pierre-Alexandre Vial	France	10.84	7.00	13.02	1.93	47.74	14.80	44.56	4.90	58.44	4:21.30	8070	GR
2nd place, silver medalist(s)	Beniamino Poserina	Italy	11.00	6.78	14.66	1.99	48.85	14.24	46.20	4.60	58.78	4:38.26	7991	
3rd place, bronze medalist(s)	Prodromos Korkizoglou	Greece	10.65	7.23	14.09	2.02	49.07	14.77	41.38	4.90	53.86	4:51.13	7932	
4	Slavoljub Nikolić	FR Yugoslavia	11.02	6.60	16.20	1.93	49.00	14.08	46.14	4.00	54.80	4:49.57	7693	
5	Luciano Asta	Italy	11.07	7.01	14.49	2.02	52.01	15.05	43.14	4.60	51.24	4:59.41	7497	
6	Anis Riahi	Tunisia	10.95	6.98	11.48	1.90	46.95	15.18	35.56	4.50	55.18	4:38.80	7448	

== Women's results ==
=== 100 meters ===
Heats – 16 June
Wind: Heat 1: +0.3 m/s, Heat 2: +1.9 m/s

Rank	Heat	Name	Nationality	Time	Notes
1	1	Ekaterini Thanou	Greece	11.22	Q
1	2	Sylviane Félix	France	11.25	Q
2	2	Maria Tsoni	Greece	11.31	Q
3	2	Manuela Levorato	Italy	11.47	Q
3	1	Giada Gallina	Italy	11.61	Q
4	2	Carme Blay	Spain	11.63	q
6	1	Patricia Morales	Spain	12.05	

Final – 16 June
Wind: +0.4 m/s

Rank	Lane	Name	Nationality	Time	Notes
1st place, gold medalist(s)	3	Ekaterini Thanou	Greece	11.13	GR
2nd place, silver medalist(s)	4	Frédérique Bangué	France	11.22	
3rd place, bronze medalist(s)	5	Sylviane Félix	France	11.27	
4	6	Maria Tsoni	Greece	11.30	PB
5	1	Giada Gallina	Italy	11.58	
6	7	Aksel Gürcan	Turkey	11.59	
7	8	Manuela Levorato	Italy	11.63	
8	1	Carme Blay	Spain	11.64	

=== 200 meters ===
Heats – 17 June
Wind: Heat 1: -0.2 m/s, Heat 2: +1.2 m/s

Rank	Heat	Name	Nationality	Time	Notes
1	1	Christine Arron	France	22.62	Q
2	1	Ekaterini Koffa	Greece	23.11	Q
3	1	Marina Filipović	FR Yugoslavia	23.28	Q, NR
1	2	Delphine Combe	France	23.46	Q
4	1	Danielle Perpoli	Italy	23.47	q
3	2	Elena Apollonio	Italy	23.83	Q
5	2	Arantxa Reinares	Spain	24.17	
6	?	Rahela Markt	Croatia	24.31	
6	1	Carmen García-Campero	Spain	24.98	

Final – 17 June
Wind: -0.9 m/s

Rank	Lane	Name	Nationality	Time	Notes
1st place, gold medalist(s)	3	Christine Arron	France	22.62	GR
2nd place, silver medalist(s)	6	Ekaterini Koffa	Greece	22.80	
3rd place, bronze medalist(s)	5	Alenka Bikar	Slovenia	22.95	
4	7	Danielle Perpoli	Italy	23.06	
5	8	Marina Filipović	FR Yugoslavia	23.55	
6	2	Marina Vasarmidou	Greece	23.66	
7	4	Delphine Combe	France	23.69	
8	1	Elena Apollonio	Italy	23.71	

=== 400 meters ===
Heats – ? June

Rank	Heat	Name	Nationality	Time	Notes
1	2	Patrizia Spuri	Italy	53.15	Q
1	1	Virna De Angeli	Italy	53.20	Q
4	2	Esther Lahoz	Spain	53.64	q
3	1	Yolanda Reyes	Spain	54.23	Q

Final – Final – 17 June

Rank	Lane	Name	Nationality	Time	Notes
1st place, gold medalist(s)	3	Virna De Angeli	Italy	51.31	GR
2nd place, silver medalist(s)	4	Dora Kyriakou	Cyprus	52.02	NR
3rd place, bronze medalist(s)	5	Patrizia Spuri	Italy	52.57	
4	1	Esther Lahoz	Spain	52.67	PB
5	6	Marie-Louise Bévis	France	52.72	
6	2	Elsa Devassoigne	France	53.16	
7	8	Yolanda Reyes	Spain	53.96	
8	7	Chrysoula Goudenoudi	Greece	54.33	

=== 800 meters ===
Heats – ? June

Rank	Heat	Name	Nationality	Time	Notes
1	1	Séverine Foulon	France	2:07.01	Q
3	1	Elisa Rea	Italy	2:07.16	Q
1	2	Hasna Benhassi	Morocco	2:09.22	Q
3	2	Nuria Fernández	Spain	2:09.50	Q
5	2	Elisabetta Artuso	Italy	2:09.91	

Final – 17 June

Rank	Name	Nationality	Time	Notes
1st place, gold medalist(s)	Hasna Benhassi	Morocco	2:03.70	
2nd place, silver medalist(s)	Jolanda Steblovnik	Slovenia	2:03.71	
3rd place, bronze medalist(s)	Séverine Foulon	France	2:04.24	
4	Theoni Kostopoulou	Greece	2:04.64	
5	Öznur Dursun	Turkey	2:06.27	
6	Elisa Rea	Italy	2:06.27	
7	Abir Nakhli	Tunisia	2:06.41	
8	Nuria Fernández	Spain	2:08.87	

=== 1500 meters ===
18 June

Rank	Name	Nationality	Time	Notes
1st place, gold medalist(s)	Nouria Mérah-Benida	Algeria	4:11.27	
2nd place, silver medalist(s)	Samira Raif	Morocco	4:11.60	
3rd place, bronze medalist(s)	Maite Zúñiga	Spain	4:11.63	
4	Karolina Skourti	Greece	4:11.85	
5	Blandine Bitzner	France	4:12.68	
6	Marta Domínguez	Spain	4:15.21	
7	Serenella Sbrissa	Italy	4:19.17	
8	Saadia Saadi	Morocco	4:19.31	
	Vincenzina Curri	Italy	DNF	

=== 5000 meters ===
16 June

Rank	Name	Nationality	Time	Notes
1st place, gold medalist(s)	Roberta Brunet	Italy	15:00.69	GR
2nd place, silver medalist(s)	Julia Vaquero	Spain	15:04.48	
3rd place, bronze medalist(s)	Zahra Ouaziz	Morocco	15:30.19	
4	Olivera Jevtić	FR Yugoslavia	15:38.12	
5	Estíbaliz Urrutia	Spain	15:47.61	
6	Chantal Dallenbach	France	16:13.39	

=== 10,000 meters ===
18 June

Rank	Name	Nationality	Time	Notes
1st place, gold medalist(s)	Chrysostomia Iakovou	Greece	32:34.87	GR
2nd place, silver medalist(s)	Silvia Sommaggio	Italy	32:41.79	
3rd place, bronze medalist(s)	Olivera Jevtić	FR Yugoslavia	32:43.42	
4	Helena Javornik	Slovenia	33:16.59	
5	Zaiha Dahmani	France	33:22.28	
6	Zhour El Kamch	Morocco	34:45.94	
7	Fatiha Klilech	Morocco	35:41.29	
	Chantal Dällenbach	France	DNF	

=== Marathon ===
15 June

Rank	Name	Nationality	Time	Notes
1st place, gold medalist(s)	Serap Aktaş	Turkey	2:39:22	GR
2nd place, silver medalist(s)	Carol Galea	Malta	2:43:53	
3rd place, bronze medalist(s)	Lale Öztürk	Turkey	2:46:56	
4	Matilde Ravizza	Italy	2:49:57	
5	Sonia Agoun	Tunisia	2:58:58	
	Anna Villani	Italy	DNF	
	Panagiota Nikolakopoulou	Greece	DNF	
	Paraskevi Kastriti	Greece	DNF	

=== 100 meters hurdles ===
17 June
Wind: +0.3 m/s

Rank	Name	Nationality	Time	Notes
1st place, gold medalist(s)	Patricia Girard	France	12.90	
2nd place, silver medalist(s)	Brigita Bukovec	Slovenia	13.01	
3rd place, bronze medalist(s)	Carla Tuzzi	Italy	13.30	
4	Nadège Joseph	France	13.44	
5	Margaret Macchiut	Italy	13.47	
6	Christina Tambaki	Greece	14.12	
7	Virginie Gollino	Monaco	15.30	
8	Anila Meta	Albania	15.46	

=== 400 meters hurdles ===
17 June

Rank	Lane	Name	Nationality	Time	Notes
1st place, gold medalist(s)	5	Nouzha Bidouane	Morocco	55.01	GR
2nd place, silver medalist(s)	3	Miriam Alonso	Spain	55.89	
3rd place, bronze medalist(s)	2	Carla Barbarino	Italy	56.76	
4	6	Eva Paniagua	Spain	57.00	
5	1	Maja Gorjup	Slovenia	57.45	
6	7	Zahra Lachgar	Morocco	59.63	
7	4	Maria Pachatouridou	Greece	1:00.73	
8	8	Klodiana Shala	Albania	1:02.46	

=== 4 x 100 meters relay ===
18 June

Rank	Lane	Nation	Competitors	Time	Notes
1st place, gold medalist(s)	5	France	Frédérique Bangué, Christine Arron, Patricia Girard, Sylviane Félix	42.63	GR
2nd place, silver medalist(s)	6	Greece	Maria Tsoni, Ekaterini Koffa, Marina Vasarmidou, Ekaterini Thanou	43.07	NR
3rd place, bronze medalist(s)	4	Italy	Stefania Ferrante, Annarita Luciano, Giada Gallina, Manuela Levorato	44.15	
4	3	Spain	Carme Blay, Arantxa Reinares, Carmen García-Campero, Patricia Morales	44.55	

=== 4 x 400 meters relay ===
Rank	Nation	Competitors	Time	Notes
1st place, gold medalist(s)	Italy	Carla Barbarino, Francesca Cola, Patrizia Spuri, Francesca Carbone	3:29.98	GR
2nd place, silver medalist(s)	France	Marie-Louise Bévis, Sophie Domenech, Marie-Line Scholent, Elsa Devassoigne	3:30.62	
3rd place, bronze medalist(s)	Spain	Miriam Alonso, Esther Lahoz, Miriam Bravo, Yolanda Reyes	3:31.93	
4	Greece	Chrysoula Goudenoudi, Maria Pachatouridou, Christina Panagou, Marina Vasarmidou	3:34.67	
5	Morocco	Nadia Zétouani, Zahra Lachgar, Fatima Zahra Dkouk, Hasna Benhassi	3:43.01	

=== 10 kilometers walk ===
Rank	Name	Nationality	Time	Notes
1st place, gold medalist(s)	Elisabetta Perrone	Italy	44:40	GR
2nd place, silver medalist(s)	Annarita Sidoti	Italy	45:35	
3rd place, bronze medalist(s)	Celia Marcén	Spain	46:07	
4	Nathalie Fortain	France	48:29	
5	Teresa Linares	Spain	49:04	
6	Christina Kokotou	Greece	51:11	
7	Kada Delić	Bosnia and Herzegovina	54:28	
8	Mimoza Xhafa	Albania	1:00:04	

=== High jump ===
17 June

Rank	Name	Nationality	1.70	1.75	1.81	1.84	1.87	1.89	1.91	1.93	1.95	1.97	2.00	Results	Notes
1st place, gold medalist(s)	Antonella Bevilacqua	Italy	–	–	o	o	o	–	o	xxo	o	x–	x	1.95	
2nd place, silver medalist(s)	Niki Bakogianni	Greece										x		1.93	
3rd place, bronze medalist(s)	Britta Bilač	Slovenia												1.91	
4	Çiğdem Arslan	Turkey												1.91	
5	Vassiliki Xenou	Greece												1.87	
6	Carlota Castrejana	Spain	–	o	o	xo	xxx							1.84	
7	Nevena Lenđel	Croatia												1.84	
8	Agni Charalambous	Cyprus												1.78	
9	Ruth Beitia	Spain	o	xxx										1.70	

=== Long jump ===
16 June

Rank	Name	Nationality	Results	Notes
1st place, gold medalist(s)	Niki Xanthou	Greece	6.72	GR
2nd place, silver medalist(s)	Linda Ferga	France	6.49	
3rd place, bronze medalist(s)	Anastasia Mahob	France	6.47	
4	Arianna Zivez	Italy	6.24	
5	Baya Rahouli	Algeria	6.19	
6	Ksenija Predikaka	Slovenia	6.06	
7	Anja Valant	Slovenia	5.93	
8	Irene Charalambous	Cyprus	5.84	

=== Triple jump ===
15 June

Rank	Name	Nationality	#1	#2	#3	#4	#5	#6	Results	Notes
1st place, gold medalist(s)	Olga Vasdeki	Greece	14.00	x	x	x	14.13	13.69	14.13	GR
2nd place, silver medalist(s)	Betty Lise	France							13.81	
3rd place, bronze medalist(s)	Antonella Capriotti	Italy							13.80	
4	Valerie Guiyoule	France							13.60	
5	Anja Valant	Slovenia							13.31	
6	Baya Rahouli	Algeria							13.25	
7	Marija Martinović	FR Yugoslavia							13.23	
8	Concepción Paredes	Spain	x	11.92	13.07	x	x	13.23	13.23	
9	Maria Costanza Moroni	Italy							12.47	

=== Shot put ===
18 June

Rank	Name	Nationality	#1	#2	#3	#4	#5	#6	Results	Notes
1st place, gold medalist(s)	Mara Rosolen	Italy	17.31	17.68	17.77	17.81	17.82		17.82	
2nd place, silver medalist(s)	Eleni Tsentemeidou	Greece							17.70	
3rd place, bronze medalist(s)	Margarita Ramos	Spain	17.42	16.99	17.03	x	x	x	17.42	
4	Laurence Manfredi	France							17.23	
5	Fotini Kyriakidou	Greece							17.05	
6	Agnese Maffeis	Italy							17.01	
7	Nataša Erjavec	Slovenia							16.94	
8	Martina de la Puente	Spain	16.70	16.70	x	x	x	x	16.70	

=== Discus throw ===
16 June

Rank	Name	Nationality	#1	#2	#3	#4	#5	#6	Results	Notes
1st place, gold medalist(s)	Anastasia Kelesidou	Greece	58.84	61.46	60.22	63.78	66.18	64.28	66.18	GR
2nd place, silver medalist(s)	Styliani Tsikouna	Greece							61.96	
3rd place, bronze medalist(s)	Isabelle Devaluez	France							61.28	
4	Agnese Maffeis	Italy							60.60	
5	Monia Kari	Tunisia							59.10	
6	Mara Rosolen	Italy							54.28	
7	Ángeles Barreiro	Spain	x	52.96	53.94	x	x	54.00	54.00	
8	Carmen Solé	Spain	46.02	49.84	51.78	49.34	52.54	x	52.54	

=== Javelin throw ===
Rank	Name	Nationality	#1	#2	#3	#4	#5	#6	Results	Notes
1st place, gold medalist(s)	Nadine Auzeil	France							57.32	
2nd place, silver medalist(s)	Claudia Coslovich	Italy							57.16	
3rd place, bronze medalist(s)	Angeliki Tsiolakoudi	Greece							56.70	
4	Marta Míguez	Spain	x	50.68	55.16	53.74	x	52.70	55.16	
5	Idoia Mariezkurrena	Spain	52.26	54.58	52.38	50.02	54.04	47.96	54.58	

=== Heptathlon ===
15–16 June

Rank	Name	Nationality	100m H	HJ	SP	200m	LJ	JT	800m	Points	Notes
1st place, gold medalist(s)	Nathalie Teppe	France	14.05	1.78	13.49	26.01	5.90	57.38	2:17.45	6161	
2nd place, silver medalist(s)	Gertrud Bacher	Italy	14.31	1.69	13.16	24.92	5.58	45.70	2:11.01	5859	
3rd place, bronze medalist(s)	Marie Collonvillé	France	13.82	1.81	11.65	24.90	5.84	38.56	2:16.67	5839	
4	Imma Clopés	Spain	14.24	1.75	13.51	25.50	5.80	41.30	2:23.17	5725	
5	Roula Hambarsian	Syria								4102	
	Susana Cruz	Spain	14.43	1.72	11.90	26.17	NM	36.14	DNS	DNF	
