= Christoph Pöstinger =

Austrian sprinter

Personal information
- Born: April 7, 1972 (age 54) Vienna, Austria
- Height: 1.86 m (6 ft 1 in)
- Weight: 75 kg (165 lb)

Sport
- Sport: Track and field
- Event: 200 m
- Club: ULC Weinland

Christoph Pöstinger (born 7 April 1972 in Vienna) is a retired Austrian sprinter who competed primarily in the 200 metres. He represented his country at the 1992 and 1996 Summer Olympics, as well as one outdoor and two indoor World Championships.

He still holds national records on several distances.

== Competition record ==
Year	Competition	Venue	Position	Event	Notes
Representing Austria
1990	World Junior Championships	Plovdiv, Bulgaria	26th (qf)	100 m	10.80
1990	World Junior Championships	Plovdiv, Bulgaria	25th (h)	110 m hurdles	14.80
1992	Olympic Games	Barcelona, Spain	22nd (qf)	200 m	20.83
1992	Olympic Games	Barcelona, Spain	7th	4 × 100 m relay	39.30
1993	World Indoor Championships	Toronto, Canada	7th (sf)	200 m	21.09
1996	Olympic Games	Atlanta, United States	50th (h)	200 m	20.98
1996	Olympic Games	Atlanta, United States	18th (h)	4 × 100 m relay	39.80
1997	World Championships	Athens, Greece	27th (h)	200 m	20.77
1997	World Championships	Athens, Greece	8th (h)	4 × 400 m relay	3:02.95
1997	Universiade	Catania, Italy	5th	200 m	20.83
1999	World Indoor Championships	Maebashi, Japan	7th (h)	4 × 400 m relay	3:09.30

== Personal bests ==
Outdoor

- 100 metres – 10.22 (+1.1 m/s, Linz 1992)
- 200 metres – 20.45 (Ebensee 1996) NR
- 400 metres – 45.80 (+0.8 m/s, Byrkjelo 1997)
- 110 metres hurdles – 14.17 (-0.5 m/s) (Villach 1991)

Indoor

- 60 metres – 6.78 (Karlsruhe 1996)
- 200 metres – 20.82 (Vienna 1996) NR
- 400 metres – 46.14 (Chemnitz 1999) NR
