= Athletics at the 1997 Summer Universiade – Men's 400 metres hurdles =

The men's 400 metres hurdles event at the 1997 Summer Universiade was held on 26, 27 and 28 August at the Stadio Cibali in Catania, Italy.

== Medalists ==
Gold	Silver	Bronze
Llewellyn Herbert; South Africa	Ruslan Mashchenko; Russia	Mubarak Al-Nubi; Qatar

== Results ==
=== Heats ===
Rank	Heat	Athlete	Nationality	Time	Notes
1	6	Ruslan Mashchenko	Russia	49.15	Q
2	6	Vadim Zadoynov	Moldova	49.66	Q
3	1	Kenneth Enyiazu	Nigeria	49.80	Q, PB
4	3	Mubarak Al-Nubi	Qatar	49.89	Q
5	5	Octavius Terry	United States	49.94	Q
6	6	Laurent Ottoz	Italy	50.00	q
7	3	Rohan Robinson	Australia	50.04	Q
8	3	Hideaki Kawamura	Japan	50.15	q
8	5	Jimmy Coco	France	50.15	Q
10	1	Joey Woody	United States	50.27	Q
11	4	Llewellyn Herbert	South Africa	50.30	Q
12	4	Marcel Schelbert	Switzerland	50.34	Q
13	2	Dusán Kovács	Hungary	50.37	Q
14	2	Jiří Mužík	Czech Republic	50.48	Q
15	4	Lukáš Souček	Czech Republic	50.57	q
16	1	Paweł Januszewski	Poland	50.62	q
17	2	Carlos Silva	Portugal	50.93	
18	3	Nabil Selmi	Algeria	50.94	
18	5	Ian Weakley	Jamaica	50.94	
20	6	Bartosz Gruman	Poland	51.04	
21	2	Paolo Bellino	Italy	51.24	
22	1	Mario Toerien	South Africa	51.36	
22	6	Darko Juričić	Croatia	51.36	
24	3	Adrian Melliger	Switzerland	51.40	
25	2	Chris Rawlinson	Great Britain	51.41	
26	2	Alexandre Marchand	Canada	51.59	
27	4	Olivier Jean-Theodore	France	51.62	
28	1	Carlos Zbinden	Chile	51.75	
29	1	Philip Feingold	Israel	52.53	
30	4	Laurier Primeau	Canada	52.56	
31	5	Alberto Carlos González	Spain	52.69	
32	3	Kehinde Aladefa	Nigeria	53.48	
33	4	Mark Edmond	New Zealand	53.79	
34	1	Matthew Beckenham	Australia	53.83	
35	2	Bilal Cantürk	Turkey	54.64	
36	3	Nidal Shelbaya	Jordan	57.18	
37	2	Tung Chung Man	Hong Kong	58.71	
	1	Henrik Vincentsen	Denmark	DQ	
	3	Siniša Peša	Yugoslavia	DQ	
	4	Sergej Šalamon	Slovenia	DQ	
	5	Vladislav Shiryayev	Russia	DQ	
	5	Marcel Lopuchovský	Slovakia	DQ	
	6	Cleverson da Silva	Brazil	DQ	
	6	Georgios Afanais	Cyprus	DQ	
	6	Willie Smith	Namibia	DNF	

=== Semifinals ===
Rank	Heat	Athlete	Nationality	Time	Notes
1	2	Llewellyn Herbert	South Africa	48.73	Q
2	2	Ruslan Mashchenko	Russia	49.07	Q
3	1	Mubarak Al-Nubi	Qatar	49.22	Q
4	1	Vadim Zadoynov	Moldova	49.28	Q
5	1	Marcel Schelbert	Switzerland	49.33	Q, NR
6	1	Joey Woody	United States	49.36	Q
6	2	Jiří Mužík	Czech Republic	49.36	Q
8	1	Dusán Kovács	Hungary	49.40	
9	2	Rohan Robinson	Australia	49.44	Q
10	2	Jimmy Coco	France	49.46	
11	2	Laurent Ottoz	Italy	49.51	
12	2	Paweł Januszewski	Poland	49.69	
13	1	Lukáš Souček	Czech Republic	50.11	
14	1	Hideaki Kawamura	Japan	50.45	
15	1	Kenneth Enyiazu	Nigeria	51.13	
	2	Octavius Terry	United States	DNS	

=== Final ===
Rank	Athlete	Nationality	Time	Notes
1st place, gold medalist(s)	Llewellyn Herbert	South Africa	48.89	
2nd place, silver medalist(s)	Ruslan Mashchenko	Russia	49.36	
3rd place, bronze medalist(s)	Mubarak Al-Nubi	Qatar	49.48	
4	Jiří Mužík	Czech Republic	49.63	
5	Joey Woody	United States	49.94	
6	Vadim Zadoynov	Moldova	50.02	
7	Marcel Schelbert	Switzerland	51.62	
8	Rohan Robinson	Australia	52.89	
