= Siniša Peša =

Serbian athlete (b. 1973)

Personal information
- Born: 6 March 1973 (age 53) Belgrade, Yugoslavia
- Height: 2.08 m (6 ft 10 in)
- Weight: 140 kg (309 lb)

Sport
- Sport: Track and field
- Event: 400 metres hurdles
- Club: Partizan Belgrade

Siniša Peša (Serbian Cyrillic: Синиша Пеша; born 6 March 1973) is a retired Serbian athlete who specialised in the 400 metres hurdles. He represented his country at the 2000 Summer Olympics, as well as at two outdoor and two indoor World Championships.

== Competition record ==
Year	Competition	Venue	Position	Event	Notes
Representing FR Yugoslavia
1997	World Indoor Championships	Paris, France	20th (h)	400 m	47.64
1997	Mediterranean Games	Bari, Italy	5th	400 m hurdles	50.45
1997	Mediterranean Games	Bari, Italy	5th	4 × 400 m relay	3:06.62
1997	World Championships	Athens, Greece	40th (h)	400 m hurdles	50.65
1997	Universiade	Catania, Italy	–	400 m hurdles	DQ
1999	World Indoor Championships	Maebashi, Japan	24th (h)	400 m	47.86
1999	World Championships	Seville, Spain	37th (h)	400 m hurdles	50.40
2000	Olympic Games	Sydney, Australia	54th (h)	400 m hurdles	52.14
2000	Olympic Games	Sydney, Australia	22nd (h)	4 × 400 m relay	3:07.41

== Personal bests ==
Outdoor

- 400 metres – 46.44 (Belgrade 1998)
- 400 metres hurdles – 49.98 (Niš 1999)

Indoor

- 400 metres – 47.17 (Pireás 1999)
