= Talhaoui =

Talhaoui is a North African surname. Notable people with the surname include:

- Farid Talhaoui (born 1982), Moroccan footballer
- Kamel Talhaoui (born 1971), Algerian former sprinter
- Lorine Talhaoui, known as Loreen (born 1983), Swedish singer and songwriter, winner of the Eurovision Song Contest 2012 and 2023
