= Malcolm Arnold (athletics coach) =

British athletics coach

Malcolm Arnold OBE is an athletics coach working for UK Athletics and its predecessors since 1974. Currently, he is the National Event Coach for Hurdles and Senior Performance Coach for UK Athletics. He has attended every Olympic Games since Mexico City in 1968, 13 in all, as a coach to National Teams. He has been responsible for coaching athletes to more than 70 major medals over a 46-year coaching career. He retired on 31 December 2016.

== Career ==
Born in Northwich, England on 4 April 1940. Graduate of Loughborough University (1958–1961). Teacher of physical education, Marple Hall Grammar School 1961–1964. Head of physical education, Rodway School, Bristol, 1964–1968. Director of coaching, Uganda 1968–1972. While director of coaching in Uganda, he moved John Akii-Bua from 110 m hurdles to 400 m hurdles. After finishing 4th in the 1970 Commonwealth Games and running the fastest season time in 1971, he was not a big favourite for the 1972 Summer Olympics in Munich, having limited competition experience. Nevertheless, he won the final there, running the inside lane, setting a world record time of 47.82 seconds. UK National Coach, Wales, 1974 - 1994. Director of coaching and development UK Athletics and head coach, UK Athletics 1994–1997. Head coach great Britain Team, Atlanta Olympic Games 1996. Head coach, UK Athletics Regional Performance Centre at the University of Bath from 1998 to date. Since 1998, 14 athletes who have trained at the Bath Regional Performance Centre have won 41 medals at major championships at Commonwealth, European, World and Olympic levels.

Contemplating retirement when Colin Jackson retired in 2003. he was persuaded by UK Athletics to continue working.

Awarded the Mussabini Medal in 1999. He was appointed Officer of the Order of the British Empire (OBE) in the 2012 Birthday Honours for services to athletics. He was made an Honorary Doctor of Education by the University of Bath in 2013. He was elected to the Loughborough University Hall of Fame in 2014. He retired on 31 December 2016, after 42 years continuous service with British Athletics and its predecessors. He was given a British Athletics Lifetime Achievement Award in March 2017.

== Athletes coached ==
- Current: Eilidh Child.
- Past: Lawrence Clarke, Dai Greene, John Akii-Bua (Olympic Champion 1972 and World Record holder 400 metres hurdles), Dale Garland, Judith Ayaa, Silver Ayoo, Ross Baillie, Jason Gardener (2004 Olympic Champion), Paul Gray, Venissa Head, Karen Hough, Colin Jackson (World Record 60 metres hurdles, 110m hurdles and 200 metres hurdles), William Koskei, Mark McKoy (1992 Olympic champion), Kay Morley-Brown (Commonwealth gold), Amos Omolo, Craig Pickering, Nigel Walker (Bronze medalist 60 metres World Championships 1987), Chris Baillie, Tasha Danvers (Olympic Bronze medallist 2008), Andrew Pozzi (European 60 m hurdles champion 2017)

== Quotes ==
A gentle start-up training plan begins with an attitude change. Getting the right mindset is the first step. Are you sufficiently strong minded to begin and then persevere? If not, stay on your couch. If you do mean to start something, then start gently after a proper medical. Begin with walking a set time every day. Then increase in sensible increments. If you are still "with it" after walking, try walking and jogging, then jogging, then running. That regime will keep you occupied for the first year! Training is a progressive activity - and you have to persevere.

== Media appearances ==
Arnold features in the 2024 documentary Colin Jackson: Resilience, talking about his role as Jackson's coach and in particular the 1992 Olympic 110m hurdles event.

== Personal life ==
Arnold married Madelyn Morrissey whom he met when they were teaching at Marple Hall in 1963. They have two children, Helen (children's photographer) and Andrew (communications specialist).
