= Ross Baillie =

Scottish athlete (1977–1999)

Personal information
- Nationality: British
- Born: 26 September 1977 Glasgow, Scotland
- Died: 18 June 1999 (aged 21) Bath, England

Sport
- Sport: Running / Hurdling
- College team: Team Bath
- Club: Victoria Park Athletic Club; Sale Harriers Manchester Athletics Club
Medal record
Representing Great Britain
Summer Universiade
Bronze medal – third place	1997 Sicily	4×100 metres
World Gymnasiade
Silver medal – second place	1994 Nicosia	200 metres
Bronze medal – third place	1994 Nicosia	4×100 metres

Ross Baillie (26 September 1977 – 18 June 1999) was a Scottish track and field athlete, older brother of Commonwealth Silver medal winner Chris Baillie. Both his parents were also track and field athletes, father Hugh representing Great Britain at 400m, and mother Sheila being a former Scottish champion at 80m hurdles (superseded by the 100m hurdles since 1968). Deemed by Colin Jackson to be his natural successor in the 110m hurdles event for Great Britain, he died at the age of 21. Fittingly, since his death, the records set by Ross have been broken by his brother.

== Early years ==
Attended Clydebank High School, winning the Eric Liddell Memorial Trophy in 1994 and 1995 whilst representing the school at the Scottish Schools Athletics Association (SSAA) Scottish Schools Championships.

He was a member of Victoria Park Athletic Club where he was coached by Bob Sommerville, and later joined Sale Harriers Manchester Athletics Club with whom he competed in English competitions.

== Team Bath ==
Ross moved to Bath to join Team Bath and take advantage of the superior sports facilities at the University of Bath. Here he was coached by Malcolm Arnold, becoming the training partner and flatmate of Colin Jackson.

== Achievements ==
Year	Competition	Venue	Position	Event	Notes
Representing United Kingdom and Scotland
1994	ISF World Gymnasiade	Nicosia, Cyprus	2nd	200 m	22.08
1994	ISF World Gymnasiade	Nicosia, Cyprus	3rd	4 × 100 m relay	41.89
1995	European Athletics Junior Championships	Nyíregyháza, Hungary	13th (h)	110 m hurdles	14.73
1996	World Junior Championships	Sydney, Australia	4th	110 m hurdles	14.01 (wind: +1.8 m/s)
1997	European U23 Championships	Turku, Finland	5th	110m hurdles	13.94 w (wind: +2.2 m/s)
1997	European U23 Championships	Turku, Finland	4th (h)	4 × 100 m relay	39.99
1997	World Student Games	Sicily, Italy	Semi-final	110 m hurdles	
1997	World Student Games	Sicily, Italy	3rd	4 × 100 m relay	39.23
1998	Commonwealth Games	Kuala Lumpur, Malaysia	8th	110 m hurdles	13.85
1999	World Indoor Championships	Maebashi, Japan	13th	60 m hurdles	7.69

== Death ==
Following a training session on 16 June 1999 Ross suffered a serious allergic reaction to peanut oil present in a coronation chicken sandwich whilst having lunch with his friend and fellow athlete Mark Foster. Despite being given an adrenalin injection by doctors at the nearby University of Bath he collapsed and failed to regain consciousness before dying due to complications arising from anaphylaxis at Royal United Hospital, Bath at 11am on 18 June 1999. Organs of his, including his heart, were transplanted afterwards.

=== Tributes ===
Ross had been in contention for the Great Britain men's team at the 1999 European Cup in Paris, France, but lost out to Tony Jarrett. The event took place the day following his death, with the British team observing a 2-minute silence in his memory and wore black ribbons at the event as a mark of respect. Dwain Chambers dedicated his victory in the 100m event to Ross and continued to wear black ribbons for the remainder of the season. Then at the 2002 European Championships in Munich, Germany, Chambers dedicated another victory to the memory of Ross.

The 110m hurdles event was withdrawn from the programme at the 1999 Scottish Championships the following week. Ross had been due to defend his title against his younger brother.

=== Legacy ===
The Ross Baillie Cup is awarded for the winner of the 60m hurdles at the Scottish Indoor Athletics Championships. The trophy was donated by his family, and was won by his brother in 2002 at the Kelvin Hall International Sports Arena in Glasgow.

His friend Mark Foster became patron of The Anaphylaxis Campaign in 2009, stating "I’m thrilled to be a patron for The Anaphylaxis Campaign. A friend of mine died of this terrible condition and I hope to be able to help raise the profile of this wonderful charity who help so many people with life-threatening allergies." He won £10,000 for the Campaign by participating in Who Wants to Be a Millionaire?, broadcast on ITV on 8 September 2009.
