= Jirka Arndt =

German long-distance runner (1973–2024)

Personal information
- Nationality: German
- Born: 1 August 1973 Wolgast, East Germany
- Died: 19 February 2024 (aged 50) Potsdam, Germany
- Height: 178 cm (5 ft 10 in)

Sport
- Sport: Middle-distance running

Jirka Arndt (1 August 1973 – 19 February 2024) was a German long-distance runner who specialized in the 5000 and 10,000 metres.

Arndt finished 6th at the 1991 European Junior Championships, 8th at the 1996 European Cup Super League, 51st at the 2000 World Cross Country Championships and 4th at the 2000 European Cup Super League. He then finished 8th in the men's 5000 meters at the 2000 Summer Olympics. Progressing with a time of 13:26.18 minutes from the qualifiers, he ran in 13:38.57 minutes in the final.

At the 1998 German championships, he won the bronze medals in both 5,000 and 10,000 metres; further, in 2000, he took a national silver medal in the 5,000 metres. At the German indoor championships, he won two bronze and one silver medal in the 3000 metres. He represented the clubs LG Potsdam and SCC Berlin. His national 5000 metres bronze in 2000 was later upgraded to gold. The original winner was Dieter Baumann, who had previously tested positive for nandrolone. While Baumann fought the outcome, the German Athletics Federation allowed him to start at the German championships. However, the IAAF reached the verdict that Baumann was guilty of doping and imposed a ban.

His personal best times were 13:21.47 minutes in the 5000 metres, achieved in June 2000 in Rome; and 28:22.17 minutes in the 10,000 metres, achieved in April 2000 in Walnut, California. He later switched to marathon races and ran his best race at the 2003 Berlin Marathon; in 2:16.28 hours.

Arndt died on 19 February 2024, at the age of 50.
