= Samir-Adel Louahla =

Algerian sprinter

Personal information
- Born: 10 September 1974 (age 52) Algiers, Algeria

Sport
- Sport: Track and field
Medal record
Representing Algeria
African Championships
| Gold medal – first place | 2000 Algiers | 4×400 m relay |
Mediterranean Games
| Gold medal – first place | 1997 Bari | 4x400 m relay |
| Bronze medal – third place | 1997 Bari | 400 m |

Samir-Adel Louahla (born 10 September 1974) is an Algerian former sprinter who competed in the 2000 Summer Olympics.
