= El Perdigón =

Coordinates: 41°25′N 5°45′W

El Perdigón, Spain
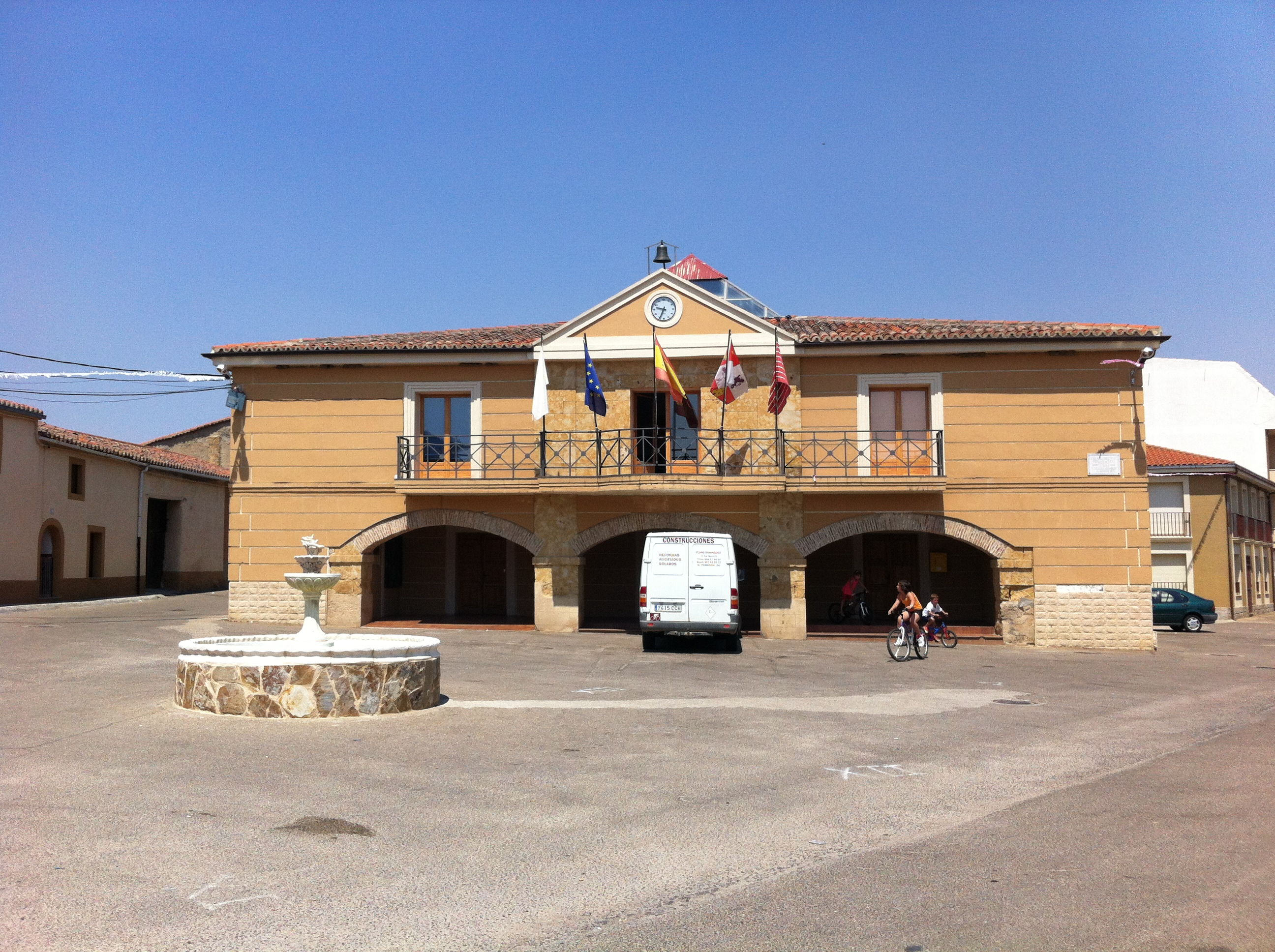

- Flag Coat of arms
- Interactive map of El Perdigón, Spain
- Country: Spain
- Autonomous community: Castile and León
- Province: Zamora
- Municipality: El Perdigón

Area
  - Total: 51 km^{2} (20 sq mi)

Population (2025-01-01)
  - Total: 673
  - Density: 13/km^{2} (34/sq mi)
- Time zone: UTC+1 (CET)
  - Summer (DST): UTC+2 (CEST)

El Perdigón is a municipality located in the province of Zamora, Castile and León, Spain. According to the 2004 census (INE), the municipality has a population of 780 inhabitants.
