= Vincent Henderson =

American sprinter

Personal information
- Born: October 20, 1972 (age 53) Southaven, Mississippi, United States

Sport
- Sport: Track and field
Medal record
Representing United States
Summer Universiade
Gold medal – first place	1997 Catania	100m
Gold medal – first place	1997 Catania	4x100m relay

Vincent Henderson (born October 20, 1972) is an American former sprinter. He is currently a medical assistant for the Texas A&M University track and field team.

Henderson competed at the University of Arkansas from 1990 to 1994, earning nine All-American honors in the 100, 200 and relays. He won gold medals in the 100 and 4×100 relay during the 1997 Summer Universiade in Italy. Personal Best of 9.95 sec 100 meters, 20.17 sec 200 meters, and 6.57 secs 60 meter dashes. 1993 silver medalist at 100 meters US vs Great Britain. 1994 US Olympic Festival Gold medalist in 100 meters.

Graduated from Texas Chiropractic College Pasadena Tx in 2004. Team Chiropractor for Texas A&M track and field since 2006 earning 8 national track and field titles while working for the Aggies.
