= Kamel Talhaoui =

Algerian sprinter (born 1971)

Kamel Talhaoui (born 18 March 1971) is an Algerian former sprinter who competed in the 2000 Summer Olympics.
