= Carlos Berlanga (athlete) =

Spanish sprinter

Personal information
- Born: 9 June 1972 (age 54) Zaragoza, Spain

Sport
- Sport: Track and field
Medal record
Representing Spain
Mediterranean Games
Bronze medal – third place	2001 Tunis	4x100m relay

Carlos Berlanga López (born 9 June 1972) is a retired Spanish sprinter, who specialized in the 100 metres.

Berlanga finished seventh in 4 × 100 m relay at the 1997 World Championships, together with teammates Frutos Feo, Venancio José and Jordi Mayoral. He also finished eighth in 4 × 100 m relay at the 2002 World Cup.

His personal best time is 10.29 seconds, achieved in July 1996 in Monachil.
