= Jonathan Carter (athlete) =

American sprinter (born 1972)

Personal information
- Born: May 10, 1972 (age 54) Fort Lauderdale, Florida, United States

Sport
- Sport: Track and field
Medal record
Representing United States
Summer Universiade
Gold medal – first place	1997 Catania	4x100m relay
Bronze medal – third place	1997 Catania	100m

Jonathan Carter (born May 10, 1972) is an American former sprinter.

Carter was an All-American sprinter for the Florida State Seminoles track and field team in the NCAA. He later became the head track and field coach at Nova Southeastern University.
