= Dan Money =

British bobsledder

Personal information
- Nationality: English
- Citizenship: United Kingdom
- Born: 17 October 1976 (age 49) Pontefract, England
- Height: 1.83 m (6 ft 0 in)
- Weight: 102 kg (225 lb)

Sport
- Sport: Bobsleigh, Athletics
- Events: two-man bobsleigh, four-man bobsleigh, 100m
Medal record
Representing Great Britain
European U23 Championships
Gold medal – first place	1997 Turku	4x100m relay
Summer Universiade
Bronze medal – third place	1997 Catania	4x100m relay

Daniel James "Dan" Money (born 17 October 1976) is a British bobsledder who has competed since 2006. At the 2010 Winter Olympics in Vancouver, he finished 17th in the four-man event while crashing out in the two-man event whilst in 8th place.

Money's best finish at the FIBT World Championships was fifth in the four-man event at St. Moritz in 2007 with Lee Johnston and Allyn Condon. His best World Cup finish was 12th in the four-man event at Whistler, British Columbia in 2009 also with Johnston and Condon. His highest two-man finish was 13th in Winterberg also in the 2009 season.

In the 2010/2011 season his best World Cup finish was 14th in the two-man event in St. Moritz. The previous week, Money and driver John James Jackson won the Europa Cup two-man event at St Moritz.

Money is a former Track & Field athlete whose notable achievements include a 100m personal best of 10.16 seconds and World University Games bronze medal in the 100m at the athletics at the 1997 Summer Universiade. He also won a European Junior Gold medal at 1995 European Athletics Junior Championships in the same 4 × 100 m team as Dwain Chambers and Marlon Devonish and a Bronze medal in the 200m.

== Athletics statistics ==
=== Personal bests ===
Distance	Time	Location	Date
60 metres (indoor)	6.71 sec	Birmingham	January 2000
100 metres	10.16 sec	Cork	June 1997
200 metres	20.75 sec	Bedford	July 1997
