= Frutos Feo =

Spanish sprinter (born 1972)

Personal information
- Born: 1 January 1972 (age 54) El Perdigón, Province of Zamora, Spain

Sport
- Sport: Track and field
Medal record
Representing Spain
Mediterranean Games
Silver medal – second place	1997 Bari	4x100m relay

Frutos Feo Pérez (born 1 January 1972) is a retired Spanish sprinter who specialized in the 100 metres.

He finished seventh in 4 x 100 metres relay at the 1997 World Championships, together with teammates Venancio José, Jordi Mayoral and Carlos Berlanga.

His personal best time is 10.22 seconds, achieved in July 1996 in Monachil.
