= Venancio José =

Spanish sprinter (born 1976)

Personal information
- Nationality: Spanish
- Born: Venancio José Murcia; 19 April 1976 (age 49) Cartagena, Spain
- Height: 1.80 m (5 ft 11 in)
- Weight: 77 kg (170 lb)

Sport
- Sport: Sprinting
- Event(s): 100 metres, 200 metres

Venancio José Murcia (born 19 April 1976) is a Spanish former sprinter who specialized in the 100 and 200 metres.

José finished seventh in the 4 × 100 m relay at the 1997 World Championships, together with teammates Frutos Feo, Jordi Mayoral and Carlos Berlanga.

José's personal best 100 metres time is 10.17 seconds, achieved in August 2000 in Castellón. His personal best 200 metres time is 20.59 seconds, achieved in September 1997 in Madrid.
