= Gentry Bradley =

American sprinter

Personal information
- Born: January 19, 1974 (age 52) Lynwood, California, U.S.
- Height: 6 ft 0 in (1.83 m)
- Weight: 170 lb (77 kg)

Sport
- Sport: Running
- College team: UCLA

Achievements and titles
- Personal best: 20.34, 20.20w
Medal record
Representing United States
Men's athletics
Universiade
Gold medal – first place	1997 Catania	200m
Gold medal – first place	1997 Catania	4x100m
USATF National Championship
Gold medal – first place	1998 New Orleans	200m
IAAF Continental Cup
Silver medal – second place	1998 Johannesburg, South Africa	200m

Gentry Bradley (born January 19, 1974) is an American former sprinter. He was the 1998 USA Champion in the 200m

While running for the University of California, Los Angeles he finished second at the 1996 NCAA Championships. This qualified him for the World University Games where he won the 1997 gold medal in the 200m. Following college he remained on the UCLA campus, working with the emerging HSI sprint team led by coach John Smith, running with Maurice Greene, Ato Boldon Marie Jose Perec and Jon Drummond. In 1998 Bradley became US National Champion in the 200m. He went on the finish second in the 200m at the 1998 IAAF World Cup held in Johannesburg, South Africa.

Bradley had run for Pius X High School, Downey, California. He won the 200m at the 1992 CIF California State Meet. Earlier in the day, he had finished second to Riley Washington's state record in the 100m. He beat Washington in the 200.

Bradley has become a successful international coach. From 2008-2011 he was the head sprint coach for the Saudi Arabia Track and Field team. In the 2010 Asian Games Bradley's team earned gold in the men's 4\times;400 relay and set a new Saudi Arabia national record. The team was ranked number 8 in the world among other national teams. His athletes also earned a silver medal in the men's 100 meters and a bronze medal in the men's 400 meters.

In December 2012 Bradley was asked to coach the Qatar Track and Field sprint team. In 2013 he trained Samuel Francis (former Asian 100 meter record holder) to running a season best 10.08 in the 100 meters. Results Francis hadn't achieved since 2008 and giving him a world 100 meter listing of #39 in 2013.

In January 2014 Bradley coached Tosin Ogunode to an Asian indoor 60 meter record of 6.50. In March 2014, Bradley again proved successful. Training Ogunode's older brother, Femi Ogunode, he achieved a Bronze medal in the 60 meters at the 2014 IAAF World Indoor Championships in Sopot, Poland. This would be Qatar's first IAAF medal in a sprint event in 21 years.

In September 2014 Bradley would increase his success with Femi Ogunode at the 2014 Asian Games in Incheon, South Korea. Achieving gold medals in the 100 meters and 200 meters events. Femi also set a new Asian 100 meter record of 9.93, resulting in an IAAF world listing of #5. He would also be ranked #6 in the 200 meters by Track and Field News for 2014.
