= Jordi Mayoral =

Spanish sprinter

Personal information
- Born: 18 May 1973 (age 53) Girona, Spain

Sport
- Sport: Track and field
Medal record
Representing Spain
Mediterranean Games
Silver medal – second place	1997 Bari	4x100m relay
Bronze medal – third place	1993 Narbonne	4x100m relay

Jordi Antônio Mayoral Rodríguez (born 18 May 1973) is a retired Spanish sprinter who specialized in the 200 metres.

He finished seventh in 4 × 100 m relay at the 1997 World Championships, together with teammates Frutos Feo, Venancio José and Carlos Berlanga.

His personal best time is 20.63 seconds, achieved in July 1995 in Vitoria. He has 10.28 seconds in the 100 metres, achieved in July 1996 in Monachil.
