= Athletics at the 1997 Summer Universiade =

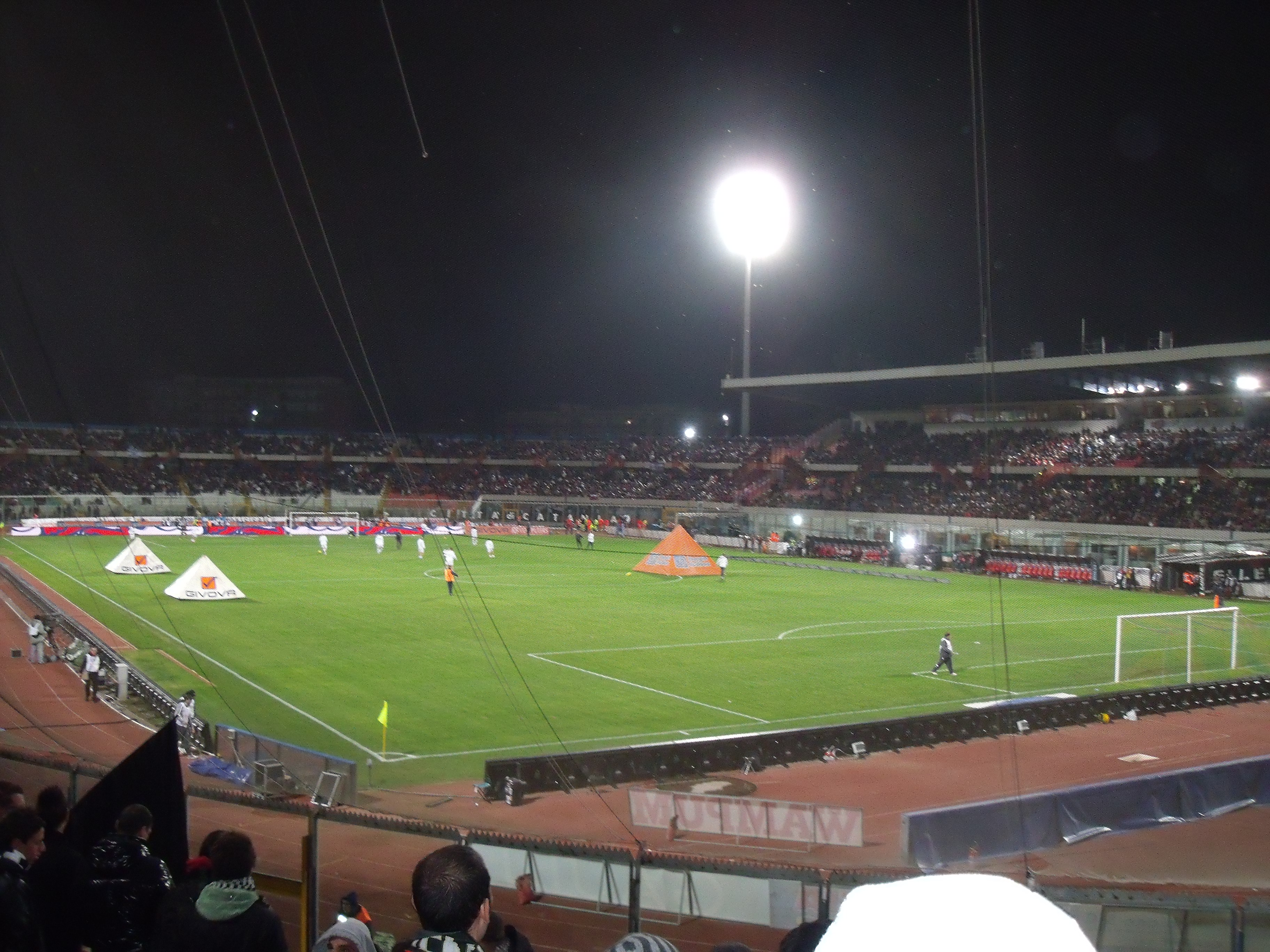
- Host stadium in 2010.
- Dates: 26–31 August 1997
- Host city: Catania, Italy
- Venue: Stadio Cibali
- Level: Senior
- Events: 45

The athletics competition at the 1997 Summer Universiade took place in the Stadio Cibali in Catania, Sicily (Italy) at the end of August 1997, shortly after the World Championships in Athens, Greece. New events were the women's hammer throw, pole vault and half marathon competition. The marathon was dropped from the programme in favour of the half distance. A total of 23 men's and 22 women's events were contested (the difference being that steeplechase was held for men only).

The United States topped the athletics medal table (as it had in 1995) with a total of 21 medals, eight of them gold. Russia was the next most successful nation, with six golds among its haul of 16 medals. Ukraine won five gold medals, while Cuba won four events and had the third highest medal total at twelve. The host nation, Italy, won eight medals. A total of 34 nations reached the medal table.

Among the 1995 men's champions, Ukrainian shot putter Yuriy Bilonoh and hammer thrower Balázs Kiss of Hungary successfully defended their titles. On the women's side, double distance champion Gabriela Szabo won the 1500 metres again and Russia's Natalya Sadova repeated as discus throw winner. Student-athletes Szabo, Iván Pedroso (long jump) Yoelbi Quesada (triple jump) and Marius Corbett (javelin) won both Universiade and World Championships gold medals that year, though there was an upset in the Universiade racewalking events, as world champion and world leader Annarita Sidoti only managed third place.

== Medal summary ==
=== Men ===
Event	Gold		Silver		Bronze	
100 metres (Wind: -0.5)	Vincent Henderson (USA)	10.22	Aleksandr Porkhomovskiy (RUS)	10.39	Jonathan Carter (USA)	10.42
200 metres (Wind: -0.3)	Gentry Bradley (USA)	20.48	Tony Wheeler (USA)	20.64	Anninos Marcoullides (CYP)	20.72
400 metres	Clement Chukwu (NGR)	44.81	Jerome Davis (USA)	45.30	Linval Laird (JAM)	45.54
800 metres	Norberto Téllez (CUB)	1:47.63	Hezekiél Sepeng (RSA)	1:47.77	Bryan Woodward (USA)	1:48.43
1500 metres	Anthony Whiteman (GBR)	3:43.57	Carlos García (ESP)	3:43.97	António Travassos (POR)	3:44.14
5000 metres	Simone Zanon (ITA)	13:57.54	Thorsten Naumann (GER)	13:58.35	Dan Browne (USA)	14:00.94
10,000 metres	Kamiel Maase (NED)	28:22.11	Dan Browne (USA)	28:27.64	Rachid Berradi (ITA)	28:30.05
110 metres hurdles (Wind: -0.7)	Andrey Kislykh (RUS)	13.44	Jonathan Nsenga (BEL)	13.51	Dudley Dorival (USA)	13.53
400 metres hurdles	Llewellyn Herbert (RSA)	48.99	Ruslan Mashchenko (RUS)	49.36	Mubarak Al-Nubi (QAT)	49.48
3000 metres steeplechase	Mark Ostendarp (GER)	8:25.83	Marcel Laros (NED)	8:27.91	Michael Buchleitner (AUT)	8:28.92
4 × 100 metres relay	United States (USA); Vincent Henderson; Bryan Howard; Jonathan Carter; Tony McCall	38.48	Cuba (CUB); Anier García; Misael Ortiz; Iván García; Luis Alberto Pérez Rionda	38.52	Great Britain (GBR); Dan Money; Jamie Henthorn; Ross Baillie; Douglas Walker	39.23
4 × 400 metres relay	United States (USA); Octavius Terry; Tony Wheeler; Jerome Davis; Bryan Woodward	3:02.53	Jamaica (JAM); Ian Weakley; Linval Laird; Garth Robinson; Dennis Blake	3:02.68	Great Britain (GBR); Richard Knowles; Sean Baldock; Mark Sesay; Jared Deacon	3:02.74
Half marathon	Marílson dos Santos (BRA)	1:03:32	Stephen Mayaka (KEN)	1:03:51	Solomon Wachira (KEN)	1:04:05
20 kilometres walk	Ilya Markov (RUS)	1:25:36	Alejandro López (MEX)	1:26:00	Arturo Di Mezza (ITA)	1:26:12
High jump	Lee Jin-Taek (KOR)	2.32	Charles Lefrançois (CAN)	2.32	Didier Detchénique (FRA)	2.28
Pole vault	Khalid Lachheb (FRA)	5.70	Chad Harting (USA)	5.60	Werner Holl (GER)	5.55
Long jump	Iván Pedroso (CUB)	8.40	James Beckford (JAM)	8.35	Gregor Cankar (SLO)	8.11
Triple jump	Yoelbi Quesada (CUB)	17.35	Aliecer Urrutia (CUB)	17.11	Robert Howard (USA)	17.08
Shot put	Yuriy Bilonoh (UKR)	20.34	Paolo Dal Soglio (ITA)	20.01	Brian Miller (USA)	19.72
Discus throw	Vladimir Dubrovshchik (BLR)	66.40	Andy Bloom (USA)	63.12	Doug Reynolds (USA)	62.76
Hammer throw	Balázs Kiss (HUN)	79.42	Vadim Kolesnik (UKR)	77.16	Ilya Konovalov (RUS)	76.16
Javelin throw	Marius Corbett (RSA)	86.50	Emeterio González (CUB)	83.48	Gregor Högler (AUT)	81.12
Decathlon	Roman Šebrle (CZE)	8380	Kamil Damašek (CZE)	8072	Marcel Dost (NED)	7899

=== Women ===
Games	Gold		Silver		Bronze	
100 metres (Wind: +1.5)	Ekaterini Thanou (GRE)	11.20	Anzhela Kravchenko (UKR)	11.34	Katia Benth (FRA)	11.35
200 metres (Wind: -0.6)	Yekaterina Leshchova (RUS)	23.18	Katia Benth (FRA)	23.31	Monika Gachevska (BUL)	23.60
400 metres	Allison Curbishley (GBR)	50.84	Olga Kotlyarova (RUS)	51.35	Idalmis Bonne (CUB)	51.72
800 metres	Irina Nedelenko (UKR)	2:00.21	Yelena Buzhenko (UKR)	2:00.84	Mariya Sinyusova (RUS)	2:01.38
1500 metres	Gabriela Szabo (ROM)	4:10.31	Carla Sacramento (POR)	4:10.40	Lidia Chojecka (POL)	4:12.38
5000 metres	Nnenna Lynch (USA)	15:47.61	Lori Durward (CAN)	15:48.68	Sarah Howell (CAN)	15:49.96
10,000 metres	Deena Drossin (USA)	33:45.31	Lucilla Andreucci (ITA)	33:54.22	Miwako Yamanaka (JPN)	34:10.28
100 metres hurdles (Wind: -1.1)	Angela Atede (NGR)	13.16	Feng Yun (CHN)	13.19	Svetlana Laukhova (RUS)	13.22
400 metres hurdles	Tetyana Tereshchuk (UKR)	54.91	Yekaterina Bakhvalova (RUS)	55.91	Daimí Pernía (CUB)	56.13
4 × 100 metres relay	United States (USA); Juan Ball; Melinda Sergent; Andrea Anderson; Passion Richardson	44.04	Russia (RUS); Yekaterina Leshcheva; Irina Korotya; Olga Povtoryova; Natalya Ignatova	44.37	Canada (CAN); Sonia Paquette; Tara Perry; LaDonna Antoine; Karen Clarke	44.59
4 × 400 metres relay	Russia (RUS); Natalya Sharova; Svetlana Goncharenko; Yekaterina Bakhvalova; Olga Kotlyarova	3:27.93	Cuba (CUB); Nancy McLeón; Julia Duporty; Daimí Pernía; Idalmis Bonne	3:29.00	Great Britain (GBR); Vicki Jamison; Michelle Pierre; Michelle Thomas; Allison Curbishley	3:30.57
Half marathon	Mari Sotani (JPN)	1:11:49	Agata Balsamo (ITA)	1:13:06	Miyuki Tokura (JPN)	1:13:20
10 kilometres walk	Larisa Ramazanova (BLR)	44:01	Rossella Giordano (ITA)	44:31	Annarita Sidoti (ITA)	44:38
High jump	Amy Acuff (USA)	1.98	Monica Iagar (ROM)	1.96	Marie Collonvillé (FRA)	1.94
Pole vault	Emma George (AUS)	4.40	Cai Weiyan (CHN)	4.30	Doris Auer (AUT)	4.10
Long jump	Olena Shekhovtsova (UKR)	6.78	Viktoriya Vershynina (UKR)	6.44	Cristina Nicolau (ROM)	6.40
Triple jump	Olena Hovorova (UKR)	14.23	Olga Cepero (CUB)	14.12	Zhanna Gureyeva (BLR)	13.93
Shot put	Irina Korzhanenko (RUS)	19.39	Corrie de Bruin (NED)	18.65	Tressa Thompson (USA)	18.26
Discus throw	Natalya Sadova (RUS)	67.02	Hu Honglian (CHN)	61.00	Nicoleta Grasu (ROM)	60.08
Hammer throw	Mihaela Melinte (ROM)	69.84	Olga Kuzenkova (RUS)	65.96	Deborah Sosimenko (AUS)	65.02
Javelin throw	Isel López (CUB)	64.30	Sonia Bisset (CUB)	63.46	Karen Forkel (GER)	60.70
Heptathlon	Mona Steigauf (GER)	6546	Irina Vostrikova (RUS)	6175	Marie Collonvillé (FRA)	6143

== Medal table ==
* Host nation (Italy)

Rank	Nation	Gold	Silver	Bronze	Total
1	United States (USA)	8	5	8	21
2	Russia (RUS)	6	7	3	16
3	Ukraine (UKR)	5	4	0	9
4	Cuba (CUB)	4	6	2	12
5	Germany (GER)	2	1	2	5
5	Romania (ROM)	2	1	2	5
7	South Africa (RSA)	2	1	0	3
8	Great Britain (GBR)	2	0	3	5
9	Belarus (BLR)	2	0	1	3
10	Nigeria (NGR)	2	0	0	2
11	Italy (ITA)*	1	4	3	8
12	Netherlands (NED)	1	2	1	4
13	France (FRA)	1	1	4	6
14	Czech Republic (CZE)	1	1	0	2
15	Japan (JPN)	1	0	2	3
16	Australia (AUS)	1	0	1	2
17	Brazil (BRA)	1	0	0	1
17	Greece (GRE)	1	0	0	1
17	Hungary (HUN)	1	0	0	1
17	South Korea (KOR)	1	0	0	1
21	China (CHN)	0	3	0	3
22	Canada (CAN)	0	2	2	4
23	Jamaica (JAM)	0	2	1	3
24	Kenya (KEN)	0	1	1	2
24	Portugal (POR)	0	1	1	2
26	Belgium (BEL)	0	1	0	1
26	Mexico (MEX)	0	1	0	1
26	Spain (ESP)	0	1	0	1
29	Austria (AUT)	0	0	3	3
30	Bulgaria (BUL)	0	0	1	1
30	Cyprus (CYP)	0	0	1	1
30	Poland (POL)	0	0	1	1
30	Qatar (QAT)	0	0	1	1
30	Slovenia (SLO)	0	0	1	1
Totals (34 entries)		45	45	45	135

== See also ==
- 1997 in the sport of athletics
- FISU World University Games
- University and college sport
