= 1993 World Championships in Athletics – Men's 4 × 100 metres relay =

These are the official results of the Men's 4 × 100 metres event at the 1993 IAAF World Championships in Stuttgart, Germany. Their final was held on Sunday 1993-08-22.

== Final ==
RANK	NATION	ATHLETES	TIME
	United States (USA)	• Jon Drummond • Andre Cason • Dennis Mitchell • Leroy Burrell	37.48
	Great Britain (GBR)	• Colin Jackson • Tony Jarrett • John Regis • Linford Christie	37.77 (AR)
	Canada (CAN)	• Robert Esmie • Glenroy Gilbert • Bruny Surin • Atlee Mahorn	37.83 (NR)
4.	Cuba (CUB)	• Andrés Simón • Iván García • Joel Isasi • Jorge Aguilera	38.39
5.	Australia (AUS)	• Paul Henderson • Damien Marsh • Dean Capobianco • Tim Jackson	38.69
6.	Germany (GER)	• Marc Blume • Robert Kurnicki • Michael Huke • Steffen Görmer	38.78
7.	Ivory Coast (CIV)	• Ouattara Lagazane • Jean-Olivier Zirignon • Frank Waota • Ibrahim Meité	38.82
8.	Sweden (SWE)	• Torbjörn Maartensson • Mattias Sunneborn • Torbjörn Eriksson • Thomas Leandersson	39.22

== Semifinals ==
- Held on Saturday 1993-08-21

=== Heat 1 ===
RANK	NATION	ATHLETES	TIME
1.	United States (USA)	• Jon Drummond • Andre Cason • Dennis Mitchell • Leroy Burrell	37.40 (=WR)
2.	Canada (CAN)	• Robert Esmie • Glenroy Gilbert • Bruny Surin • Atlee Mahorn	37.99 (NR)
3.	Great Britain (GBR)	• Jason John • Tony Jarrett • Darren Braithwaite • Linford Christie	38.05
4.	Australia (AUS)	• Paul Henderson • Damien Marsh • Dean Capobianco • Tim Jackson	38.46 (AR)
5.	Ghana (GHA)	• Salaam Gariba • Nelson Boateng • Solomon Amegatcher • Emmanuel Tuffour	38.61 (NR)
6.	Greece (GRE)	• Alexandros Genovelis • Georgios Panagiotopoulos • Ioannis Nafpliotis • Alexandros Terzian	39.00
7.	Japan (JPN)	• Hideki Onohara • Tatsuo Sugimoto • Satoru Inoue • Koji Ito	39.01
8.	New Zealand (NZL)	• Todd Blythe • Mark Keddell • Chris Donaldson • Augustine Nketia	39.93

=== Heat 2 ===
RANK	NATION	ATHLETES	TIME
1.	Germany (GER)	• Marc Blume • Robert Kurnicki • Michael Huke • Steffen Görmer	38.58
2.	Cuba (CUB)	• Andrés Simón • Iván García • Joel Isasi • Jorge Aguilera	38.73
3.	Sweden (SWE)	• Torbjörn Mårtensson • Torbjörn Eriksson • Lars Hedner • Thomas Leandersson	38.96 (NR)
4.	Ivory Coast (CIV)	• Ouattara Lagazane • Jean-Olivier Ziriginon • Frank Waota • Ibrahim Meité	38.97
5.	Spain (ESP)	• Juan Jesus Trapero • Pedro Pablo Nolet • Jordi Mayoral • Enrique Talavera	39.17
	France (FRA)	• Olivier Théophile • Daniel Sangouma • Jean-Charles Trouabal • Éric Perrot	DQ
	Italy (ITA)	• Giorgio Marras • Carlo Occhiena • Andrea Amici • Ezio Madonia	DQ
	Switzerland (SUI)	• Kevin Widmer • Olivier Bettex • Alain Reimann • David Dollé	DQ

== Heats ==
- Held on Saturday 1993-08-21

=== Heat 1 ===
RANK	NATION	ATHLETES	TIME
1.	Ivory Coast (CIV)	• Ouattara Lagazane • Jean-Olivier Zirignon • Frank Waota • Ibrahim Meité	38.77
2.	Great Britain (GBR)	• Jason John • Tony Jarrett • Darren Braithwaite • Linford Christie	38.80
3.	Sweden (SWE)	• Torbjörn Mårtensson • Torbjörn Eriksson • Lars Hedner • Thomas Leandersson	39.32
4.	Japan (JPN)	• Hideki Onohara • Hisatsugu Suzuki • Hideyaki Miyata • Satoru Inoue	39.40
5.	Switzerland (SUI)	• Kevin Widmer • Olivier Bettex • Alain Reimann • David Dollé	39.46
6.	New Zealand (NZL)	• Todd Blythe • Mark Keddell • Chris Donaldson • Augustine Nketia	39.71

=== Heat 2 ===
RANK	NATION	ATHLETES	TIME
1.	Canada (CAN)	• Robert Esmie • Glenroy Gilbert • Bruny Surin • Atlee Mahorn	38.86
2.	France (FRA)	• Olivier Théophile • Daniel Sangouma • Jean-Charles Trouabal • Éric Perrot	38.94
3.	Ghana (GHA)	• Salaam Gariba • Nelson Boateng • Solomon Amegatcher • Emmanuel Tuffour	39.01
4.	Spain (ESP)	• Juan Jesus Trapero • Pedro Pablo Nolet • Jordi Mayoral • Enrique Talavera	39.44
5.	Trinidad and Tobago (TRI)	• Wendell Williams • Patrick Delice • Neil de Silva • Ato Boldon	40.24
	Russia (RUS)	• Pavel Galkin • Oleg Fatun • Andrey Fedoriv • Aleksandr Porkhomovskiy	DQ

=== Heat 3 ===
RANK	NATION	ATHLETES	TIME
1.	United States (USA)	• Jon Drummond • Andre Cason • Calvin Smith • Leroy Burrell	38.12
2.	Australia (AUS)	• Paul Henderson • Damien Marsh • Dean Capobianco • Tim Jackson	39.04
3.	Greece (GRE)	• Alexandros Genovelis • Georgios Panagiotopoulos • Ioannis Nafpliotis • Alexandros Terzian	39.91
4.	Sierra Leone (SLE)	• Francis Keyta • Foday Sillah • Haroun Korjie • Sanusi Turay	40.69
5.	Netherlands Antilles (AHO)	• Ellsworth Manuel • Junior de Lain • Pierre Monte • Edelberg Martinus	42.20
	Senegal (SEN)		DNS
	Jamaica (JAM)		DNS

=== Heat 4 ===
RANK	NATION	ATHLETES	TIME
1.	Cuba (CUB)	• Andrés Simón • Iván García • Joel Isasi • Jorge Aguilera	38.66
2.	Germany (GER)	• Marc Blume • Robert Kurnicki • Michael Huke • Steffen Görmer	38.90
3.	Italy (ITA)	• Giorgio Marras • Carlo Occhiena • Andrea Amici • Ezio Madonia	39.37
4.	Mexico (MEX)	• Jaime Lopez • Alejandro Cárdenas • Herman Adam • Miguel Miranda	39.79
5.	Thailand (THA)	• Worasit Vachaprutti • Visut Watanasin • Niti Piyapan • Vissanu Sophanich	40.12
6.	Barbados (BAR)	• Edsel Chase • Roger Jordan • Henrico Atkins • Kirk Cummins	40.24

== See also ==
- 1990 Men's European Championships 4 × 100 m Relay (Split)
- 1991 Men's World Championships 4 × 100 m Relay (Tokyo)
- 1992 Men's Olympic 4 × 100 m Relay (Barcelona)
- 1994 Men's European Championships 4 × 100 m Relay (Helsinki)
- 1995 Men's World Championships 4 × 100 m Relay (Gothenburg)
