= 1994 European Athletics Indoor Championships – Men's 200 metres =

The men's 200 metres event at the 1994 European Athletics Indoor Championships was held in Palais Omnisports de Paris-Bercy on 12 and 13 March.

== Medalists ==
Gold	Silver	Bronze
Daniel Sangouma; France	Vladislav Dologodin; Ukraine	Georgios Panagiotopoulos; Greece

== Results ==
=== Heats ===
First 2 from each heat (Q) and the next 2 fastest (q) qualified for the semifinals.

Rank	Heat	Name	Nationality	Time	Notes
1	4	Daniel Sangouma	France	20.68	Q
2	4	Geir Moen	Norway	20.75	Q
3	1	Vladislav Dologodin	Ukraine	20.92	Q
4	5	Robert Kurnicki	Germany	20.99	Q
5	2	Georgios Panagiotopoulos	Greece	21.01	Q
5	3	Ioannis Nafpliotis	Greece	21.01	Q
5	4	Solomon Wariso	Great Britain	21.01	q
8	5	Evgenios Papadopoulos	Greece	21.05	Q
9	3	Michael Kutscher	Germany	21.09	Q
10	3	Darren Braithwaite	Great Britain	21.13	q
11	1	Giorgio Marras	Italy	21.15	Q
12	1	Andrey Fedoriv	Russia	21.16	
12	2	Patrick Stevens	Belgium	21.16	Q
14	2	Michael Huke	Germany	21.19	
15	1	Philip Goedluck	Great Britain	21.31	
15	3	Aleksandr Porkhomovskiy	Russia	21.31	
15	4	Joakim Öhman	Sweden	21.31	
18	2	Kevin Widmer	Switzerland	21.32	
19	3	Niklas Eriksson	Sweden	21.47	
20	5	Valter Pilch	Czech Republic	21.50	
21	4	Vítor Jorge	Portugal	21.56	
22	1	Jean-Louis Rapnouil	France	21.85	
23	1	Aham Okeke	Norway	21.89	
24	4	Tsvetoslav Stankulov	Bulgaria	21.99	
25	2	Pál Rezák	Hungary	22.03	
	2	Kastytis Klimas	Lithuania	DNF	
	5	Rikard Rasmusson	Sweden	DNS	
	5	Daniel Cojocaru	Romania	DNS	

=== Semifinals ===
First 3 from each semifinal qualified directly (Q) for the final.

Rank	Heat	Name	Nationality	Time	Notes
1	1	Vladislav Dologodin	Ukraine	20.82	Q
2	2	Daniel Sangouma	France	20.86	Q
3	1	Evgenios Papadopoulos	Greece	20.93	Q
4	2	Darren Braithwaite	Great Britain	21.01	Q
5	2	Georgios Panagiotopoulos	Greece	21.12	Q
6	2	Geir Moen	Norway	21.13	
7	1	Ioannis Nafpliotis	Greece	21.30	Q
8	1	Solomon Wariso	Great Britain	21.52	
9	2	Michael Kutscher	Germany	21.91	
10	1	Patrick Stevens	Belgium	22.11	
	1	Robert Kurnicki	Germany	DNF	
	2	Giorgio Marras	Italy	DNS	

=== Final ===
Rank	Name	Nationality	Time	Notes
1st place, gold medalist(s)	Daniel Sangouma	France	20.68	
2nd place, silver medalist(s)	Vladislav Dologodin	Ukraine	20.76	
3rd place, bronze medalist(s)	Georgios Panagiotopoulos	Greece	20.99	
4	Evgenios Papadopoulos	Greece	21.15	
5	Darren Braithwaite	Great Britain	21.30	
6	Ioannis Nafpliotis	Greece	21.61	
