= 1994 European Athletics Championships – Men's 200 metres =

Men's 200 metres at the 1994 European Athletics Championships
- Venue: Helsinki Olympic Stadium
- Location: Helsinki
- Dates: 10 August (heats); 11 August (semi-finals & final)
- Competitors: 31 from 19 nations
- Winning time: 20.30

Medalists
gold medal	Geir Moen	Norway
silver medal	Vladislav Dologodin	Ukraine
bronze medal	Patrick Stevens	Belgium

These are the official results of the Men's 200 metres event at the 1994 European Championships in Helsinki, Finland, held at Helsinki Olympic Stadium on 10 and 11 August 1994.

== Participation ==
According to an unofficial count, 31 athletes from 19 countries participated in the event.

- Belgium (1)
- Cyprus (1)
- Denmark (1)
- Finland (3)
- France (2)
- Germany (3)
- Great Britain (1)
- Greece (2)
- Israel (1)
- Italy (2)
- Malta (1)
- Netherlands (1)
- Norway (2)
- Romania (1)
- Russia (2)
- Spain (1)
- Sweden (1)
- Switzerland (2)
- Ukraine (3)

== Results ==
=== Heats ===
10 August

==== Heat 1 ====
Rank	Name	Nationality	Time	Notes
1	Yeóryios Panayiotópoulos	Greece	20.81	Q
2	Geir Moen	Norway	21.29	Q
3	Michael Huke	Germany	21.40	Q
4	Aleksey Chikhachov	Ukraine	21.51	Q
5	Markus Lindahl	Finland	21.55	
6	Mario Bonello	Malta	22.60	
	Pedro Pablo Nolet	Spain	DNS	
			Wind: -0.3 m/s	

==== Heat 2 ====
Rank	Name	Nationality	Time	Notes
1	Giorgio Marras	Italy	20.84	Q
2	Jean-Charles Trouabal	France	20.93	Q
3	Philip Goedluck	Great Britain	21.01	Q
4	Ari Pakarinen	Finland	21.03	Q
5	Lars Pedersen	Denmark	21.21	q
6	Frutos Feo	Spain	21.48	
	Torbjörn Eriksson	Sweden	DNS	
			Wind: -0.1 m/s	

==== Heat 3 ====
Rank	Name	Nationality	Time	Notes
1	Daniel Sangouma	France	20.86	Q
2	Patrick Stevens	Belgium	20.99	Q
3	Andrey Fedoriv	Russia	21.04	Q
4	Alexander Lack	Germany	21.25	Q
5	Per Ivar Sivle	Norway	21.40	q
6	Alain Reimann	Switzerland	21.42	
			Wind: -0.5 m/s	

==== Heat 4 ====
Rank	Name	Nationality	Time	Notes
1	Sergey Osovic	Ukraine	20.90	Q
2	Anninos Marcoullides	Cyprus	21.01	Q
3	David Dollé	Switzerland	21.01	Q
4	Björn Sinnhuber	Germany	21.37	Q
5	Regilio van der Vloot	Netherlands	21.43	
	Daniel Cojocaru	Romania	DNF	
			Wind: -0.6 m/s	

==== Heat 5 ====
Rank	Name	Nationality	Time	Notes
1	Vladislav Dologodin	Ukraine	20.80	Q
2	Lars Hedner	Sweden	20.92	Q
3	Evyénios Papadópoulos	Greece	21.07	Q
4	Carlo Occhiena	Italy	21.19	Q
5	Oleg Fatun	Russia	21.25	q
6	Pertti Purola	Finland	21.30	q
7	Kfir Golan	Israel	21.54	
			Wind: -0.4 m/s	

=== Quarter-finals ===
10 August

==== Heat 1 ====
Rank	Name	Nationality	Time	Notes
1	Geir Moen	Norway	20.68	Q
2	Anninos Marcoullides	Cyprus	20.94	Q
3	Daniel Sangouma	France	20.96	Q
4	Ari Pakarinen	Finland	21.02	Q
5	Giorgio Marras	Italy	21.03	q
6	Evyénios Papadópoulos	Greece	21.16	q
7	Aleksey Chikhachov	Ukraine	21.53	
8	Björn Sinnhuber	Germany	21.72	
			Wind: +0.5 m/s	

==== Heat 2 ====
Rank	Name	Nationality	Time	Notes
1	Patrick Stevens	Belgium	20.76	Q
2	Sergey Osovic	Ukraine	20.81	Q
3	Yeóryios Panayiotópoulos	Greece	20.92	Q
4	Philip Goedluck	Great Britain	20.99	Q
5	Oleg Fatun	Russia	21.10	q
6	Michael Huke	Germany	21.22	
7	Per Ivar Sivle	Norway	21.47	
8	Carlo Occhiena	Italy	21.56	
			Wind: +0.3 m/s	

==== Heat 3 ====
Rank	Name	Nationality	Time	Notes
1	Vladislav Dologodin	Ukraine	20.76	Q
2	David Dollé	Switzerland	20.80	Q
3	Jean-Charles Trouabal	France	20.87	Q
4	Andrey Fedoriv	Russia	20.96	Q
5	Lars Hedner	Sweden	21.09	q
6	Alexander Lack	Germany	21.40	
7	Pertti Purola	Finland	21.51	
8	Lars Pedersen	Denmark	21.50	
			Wind: -1.2 m/s	

=== Semi-finals ===
11 August

==== Heat 1 ====
Rank	Name	Nationality	Time	Notes
1	Geir Moen	Norway	20.56	Q
2	David Dollé	Switzerland	20.69	Q
3	Sergey Osovic	Ukraine	20.78	Q
4	Yeóryios Panayiotópoulos	Greece	20.79	Q
5	Giorgio Marras	Italy	20.95	
6	Daniel Sangouma	France	20.98	
7	Ari Pakarinen	Finland	21.12	
8	Oleg Fatun	Russia	21.21	
			Wind: +0.5 m/s	

==== Heat 2 ====
Rank	Name	Nationality	Time	Notes
1	Vladislav Dologodin	Ukraine	20.52	Q
2	Jean-Charles Trouabal	France	20.74	Q
3	Patrick Stevens	Belgium	20.74	Q
4	Andrey Fedoriv	Russia	20.75	Q
5	Lars Hedner	Sweden	20.91	
6	Anninos Marcoullides	Cyprus	21.06	
7	Philip Goedluck	Great Britain	21.11	
	Evyénios Papadópoulos	Greece	DNS	
			Wind: +1.7 m/s	

=== Final ===
11 August

Rank	Name	Nationality	Time	Notes
1st place, gold medalist(s)	Geir Moen	Norway	20.30	NR
2nd place, silver medalist(s)	Vladislav Dologodin	Ukraine	20.47	
3rd place, bronze medalist(s)	Patrick Stevens	Belgium	20.68	
4	Sergey Osovic	Ukraine	20.70	
5	Jean-Charles Trouabal	France	20.70	
6	Andrey Fedoriv	Russia	20.78	
7	Yeóryios Panayiotópoulos	Greece	20.92	
8	David Dollé	Switzerland	21.10	
			Wind: -0.1 m/s	

== See also ==
- 1990 Men's European Championships 200 metres (Split)
- 1991 Men's World Championships 200 metres (Tokyo)
- 1992 Men's Olympic 200 metres (Barcelona)
- 1993 Men's World Championships 200 metres (Stuttgart)
- 1995 Men's World Championships 200 metres (Gothenburg)
- 1996 Men's Olympic 200 metres (Atlanta)
- 1998 Men's European Championships 200 metres (Budapest)
