= 1994 European Cup Super League =

These are the full results of the 1994 European Cup Super League in athletics which was held on 25 and 26 June 1994 at the Alexander Stadium in Birmingham, United Kingdom.

== Team standings ==
Men
Pos.	Nation	Points
1	Germany	121
2	Great Britain	106.5
3	Russia	101
4	Ukraine	87
5	Italy	84
6	Sweden	81.5
7	France	80
8	Romania	55

Women
Pos.	Nation	Points
1	Germany	98
2	Great Britain	97
3	Russia	95
4	Ukraine	86
5	Belarus	64
6	France	60
7	Romania	60
8	Spain	50

== Men's results ==
=== 100 metres ===
25 June
Wind: +0.9 m/s

Rank	Name	Nationality	Time	Notes	Points
1	Linford Christie	Great Britain	10.21		8
2	Marc Blume	Germany	10.37		7
3	Pavel Galkin	Russia	10.42		6
4	Sandro Floris	Italy	10.45		5
5	Vladyslav Dolohodin	Ukraine	10.46		4
6	Daniel Cojocaru	Romania	10.50		3
7	Éric Perrot	France	10.56		2
8	Mikael Wennolf	Sweden	10.62		1

=== 200 metres ===
26 June
Wind: -0.1 m/s

Rank	Name	Nationality	Time	Notes	Points
1	Linford Christie	Great Britain	20.67		8
2	Serhiy Osovych	Ukraine	20.70		7
3	Daniel Sangouma	France	21.04		6
4	Michael Huke	Germany	21.11		5
5	Daniel Cojocaru	Romania	21.17		4
6	Andrey Fedoriv	Russia	21.18		3
7	Lars Hedner	Sweden	21.23		2
8	Sandro Floris	Italy	21.28		1

=== 400 metres ===
25 June

Rank	Name	Nationality	Time	Notes	Points
1	Roger Black	Great Britain	45.08		8
2	Jean-Louis Rapnouil	France	46.43		7
3	Dmitriy Golovastov	Russia	46.58		6
4	Rikard Rasmusson	Sweden	46.93		5
5	Thomas Schönlebe	Germany	46.96		4
6	Andrea Nuti	Italy	47.27		3
7	Vadim Ogiy	Ukraine	47.59		2
8	Ionică Cărăbaș	Romania	48.46		1

=== 800 metres ===
26 June

Rank	Name	Nationality	Time	Notes	Points
1	Nico Motchebon	Germany	1:48.10		8
2	Davide Cadoni	Italy	1:48.42		7
3	Craig Winrow	Great Britain	1:48.76		6
4	Andrey Loginov	Russia	1:49.91		5
5	Torbjörn Johansson	Sweden	1:50.26		4
6	Andrey Buzhenko	Ukraine	1:50.64		3
7	Ion Bogde	Romania	2:05.22		2
	Jimmy Jean-Joseph	France	DQ		0

=== 1500 metres ===
26 June

Rank	Name	Nationality	Time	Notes	Points
1	Andriy Bulkovskyi	Ukraine	3:49.33		8
2	Rüdiger Stenzel	Germany	3:49.38		7
3	Gary Lough	Great Britain	3:49.57		6
4	Samir Benfarès	France	3:49.61		5
5	Giuseppe D'Urso	Italy	3:49.98		4
6	Vyacheslav Shabunin	Russia	3:50.44		3
7	Ovidiu Olteanu	Romania	3:50.95		2
8	Peter Koskenkorva	Sweden	3:52.38		1

=== 5000 metres ===
26 June

Rank	Name	Nationality	Time	Notes	Points
1	Dieter Baumann	Germany	13:48.95		8
2	Abdellah Béhar	France	13:49.12		7
3	Ovidiu Olteanu	Romania	13:49.43		6
4	John Mayock	Germany	13:50.58		5
5	Umberto Pusterla	Italy	13:51.80		4
6	Vener Kashayev	Russia	13:53.48		3
7	Claes Nyberg	Sweden	14:13.81		2
8	Valeriy Chesak	Ukraine	14:24.49		1

=== 10,000 metres ===
25 June

Rank	Name	Nationality	Time	Notes	Points
1	Francesco Panetta	Italy	28:38.45		8
2	Stéphane Franke	Germany	28:38.99		7
3	Oleg Strizhakov	Russia	29:03.55		6
4	Jonny Danielson	Sweden	29:10.85		5
5	Gary Staines	Great Britain	29:57.27		4
6	François Barreau	France	30:02.33		3
7	Ion Avramescu	Romania	30:04.50		2
8	Igor Surla	Ukraine	31:02.87		1

=== 110 metres hurdles ===
26 June
Wind: +1.9 m/s

Rank	Name	Nationality	Time	Notes	Points
1	Florian Schwarthoff	Germany	13.35		8
2	Vladimir Belokon	Ukraine	13.62		7
3	Andrew Tulloch	Great Britain	13.65		6
4	Laurent Ottoz	Italy	13.67		5
5	George Boroi	Romania	13.68		4
6	Claes Albihn	Sweden	13.68		3
7	Dan Philibert	France	13.70		2
8	Vladimir Shishkin	Russia	14.04		1

=== 400 metres hurdles ===
25 June

Rank	Name	Nationality	Time	Notes	Points
1	Sven Nylander	Sweden	49.36		8
2	Oleh Tverdokhlib	Ukraine	49.37		7
3	Stéphane Diagana	France	49.47		6
4	Fabrizio Mori	Italy	49.96		5
5	Edgar Itt	Germany	50.08		4
6	Peter Crampton	Great Britain	50.09		3
7	Ruslan Mashchenko	Russia	51.23		2
8	Mugur Mateescu	Romania	51.81		1

=== 3000 metres steeplechase ===
26 June

Rank	Name	Nationality	Time	Notes	Points
1	Alessandro Lambruschini	Italy	8:24.98		8
2	Steffen Brand	Germany	8:27.83		7
3	Justin Chaston	Great Britain	8:29.99		6
4	Vladimir Golyas	Russia	8:32.97		5
5	Oleksiy Patserin	Ukraine	8:33.78		4
6	Florin Ionescu	Romania	8:38.94		3
7	Thierry Brusseau	France	8:40.99		2
8	Magnus Bengtsson	Sweden	8:58.54		1

=== 4 × 100 metres relay ===
25 June

Rank	Nation	Athletes	Time	Note	Points
1	Great Britain	Jason John, Solomon Wariso, John Regis, Linford Christie	38.72		8
2	Ukraine	Serhiy Osovych, Dmytro Vanyaikin, Oleh Kramarenko, Vladyslav Dolohodin	38.79	NR	7
3	Germany	Holger Blume, Steffen Görmer, Michael Huke, Marc Blume	38.81		6
4	Russia	Pavel Galkin, Dmitry Mikhaylov, Oleg Fatun, Yuriy Mizera	39.12		5
5	France	Hermann Lomba, Éric Perrot, Daniel Sangouma, Laurent Leconte	39.27		4
6	Italy	Marco Menchini, Domenico Nettis, Sandro Floris, Ezio Madonia	39.33		3
7	Sweden	Mikael Wennolf, Matias Ghansah, Lars Hedner, Thomas Leandersson	39.39		2
8	Romania	Marian Gogoase, Daniel Cojocaru, Florian Ștefan, George Boroi	40.56		1

=== 4 × 400 metres relay ===
26 June

Rank	Nation	Athletes	Time	Note	Points
1	Great Britain	Du'aine Ladejo, Adrian Patrick, Brian Whittle, Roger Black	3:02.50		8
2	Russia	Dmitry Golovastov, Mikhail Vdovin, Ruslan Mashchenko, Dmitriy Kosov	3:03.57		7
3	France	Jean-Louis Rapnouil, Bruno Konczylo, Pierre-Marie Hilaire, Stéphane Diagana	3:03.74		6
4	Sweden	Mikael Ekman, Sven Nylander, Rikard Rasmusson, Niklas Wallenlind	3:05.34		5
5	Italy	Marco Vaccari, Giorgio Frinolli, Alessandro Aimar, Andrea Nuti	3:06.04		4
6	Germany	Bodo Unger, Karsten Just, Daniel Bittner, Kai Karsten	3:06.16		3
7	Romania	Mugur Mateescu, Zsombor Filep, Ionică Cărăbaș, Daniel Cojocaru	3:12.05		2
	Ukraine		DQ		0

=== High jump ===
25 June

Rank	Name	Nationality	2.10	2.15	2.20	2.25	2.28	Result	Notes	Points
1	Wolf-Hendrik Beyer	Germany	–	o	xo	o	xxx	2.25		8
2	Patrick Thavelin	Sweden	o	o	o	xxx		2.20		7
3	Dalton Grant	Great Britain	–	o	xo	xxx		2.20		6
4	Leonid Pumalainen	Russia	o	xo	xxo	xxx		2.20		5
5	Eugen-Cristian Popescu	Romania	o	o	xxx			2.15		3.5
5	Roberto Ferrari	Italy	o	o	xxx			2.15		3.5
7	Joël Vincent	France	xo	o	xxx			2.15		2
8	Sergey Kolesnik	Ukraine	xxo	xxx				2.10		1

=== Pole vault ===
26 June

Rank	Name	Nationality	4.60	5.00	5.20	5.40	5.50	5.60	5.70	6.00	Result	Notes	Points
1	Jean Galfione	France	–	–	–	–	o	–	o	xxx	5.70		8
2	Patrik Stenlund	Sweden	o	–	xo	xo	o	o	xxx		5.60		7
3	Tim Lobinger	Germany	–	–	o	o	o	xxo	xxx		5.60		6
4	Sergey Yesipchuk	Ukraine	–	–	–	xo	xxx				5.40		5
5	Mike Edwards	Great Britain	–	o	o	xxx					5.20		4
6	Gianni Iapichino	Italy	–	o	xxx						5.00		3
7	Razvan Enescu	Romania	o	xxx							4.60		2
	Rodion Gataullin	Russia	–	–	–	–	–	xxx			NM		0

=== Long jump ===
25 June

Rank	Name	Nationality	#1	#2	#3	#4	#5	#6	Result	Notes	Points
1	Stanislav Tarasenko	Russia	7.98	8.02	7.90	7.74	x	7.94	8.02		8
2	Dietmar Haaf	Germany	7.36	7.57	7.68	7.82	7.84	7.82	7.84		7
3	Bogdan Tudor	Romania	x	7.45	x	x	7.57	7.78	7.78		6
4	Mattias Sunneborn	Sweden	7.57	7.50	7.75	7.61	7.59	7.48	7.75		5
5	Yevgeniy Semenyuk	Ukraine	x	7.45	7.62	7.70	x	–	7.70		4
6	Barrington Williams	Great Britain	7.40	7.27	–	7.33	7.29	7.66	7.66		3
7	Olivier Borderan	France	7.54	7.50	7.62	x	x	x	7.62		2
8	Milko Campus	Italy	x	7.49	7.44	7.32	7.47	7.60	7.60		1

=== Triple jump ===
26 June

Rank	Name	Nationality	#1	#2	#3	#4	#5	#6	Result	Notes	Points
1	Denis Kapustin	Russia	17.21	17.30	17.00	x	–	–	17.30		8
2	Tord Henriksson	Sweden	16.79	16.55	16.66	16.59	x	16.99	16.99		7
3	Serge Hélan	France	16.18	16.51	16.15	x	16.62	16.92	16.92		6
4	Jonathan Edwards	Great Britain	16.86	16.87	16.88	15.36	16.57	x	16.88		5
5	Volodymyr Kravchenko	Ukraine	15.82	16.03	16.03	16.16	15.93	x	16.16		4
6	Daniele Buttiglione	Italy	15.66	15.85	x	x	16.15	15.91	16.15		3
7	Karsten Richter	Germany	15.58	x	15.85	16.02	x	16.12	16.12		2
8	Lucian Sfiea	Romania	15.02	15.19	15.24	15.67	x	15.91	15.91		1

=== Shot put ===
25 June

Rank	Name	Nationality	#1	#2	#3	#4	#5	#6	Result	Notes	Points
1	Paolo Dal Soglio	Italy	19.48	19.39	19.65	x	19.40	19.69	19.69		8
2	Roman Virastyuk	Ukraine	18.97	19.09	x	x	19.40	x	19.40		7
3	Gheorghe Guşet	Romania	19.23	x	19.05	x	18.93	x	19.23		6
4	Oliver-Sven Buder	Germany	19.02	x	18.92	x	18.85	18.89	19.02		5
5	Sergey Nikolayev	Russia	18.87	x	18.71	x	18.83	18.98	18.98		4
6	Kent Larsson	Sweden	18.87	x	x	x	18.54	18.89	18.89		3
7	Paul Edwards	Great Britain	x	18.10	x	x	x	18.07	18.10		2
8	Jean-Louis Lebon	France	x	x	16.52	16.70	17.05	17.13	17.13		1

=== Discus throw ===
26 June

Rank	Name	Nationality	#1	#2	#3	#4	#5	#6	Result	Notes	Points
1	Dimitriy Shevchenko	Russia	59.16	64.74	x	63.20	63.70	x	64.74		8
2	Jürgen Schult	Germany	–	60.32	60.26	64.00	64.42	63.96	64.42		7
3	Volodymyr Zinchenko	Ukraine	–	61.88	62.80	62.00	59.56	61.44	62.80		6
4	Costel Grasu	Romania	59.18	60.62	57.34	58.04	x	x	60.62		5
5	Dag Solhaug	Sweden	54.10	52.84	55.66	56.62	58.54	59.72	59.72		4
6	Robert Weir	Great Britain	55.84	58.34	58.88	58.92	56.22	57.52	58.92		3
7	Diego Fortuna	Italy	57.16	53.38	x	x	x	56.28	57.16		2
8	Jean-Claude Retel	France	57.14	–	x	54.00	52.54	x	57.14		1

=== Hammer throw ===
26 June

Rank	Name	Nationality	#1	#2	#3	#4	#5	#6	Result	Notes	Points
1	Vasiliy Sidorenko	Russia	78.76	77.32	77.74	x	78.26	x	78.76		8
2	Andriy Skvaruk	Ukraine	76.82	76.14	78.20	77.40	76.58	78.14	78.20		7
3	Christophe Épalle	France	75.66	77.66	x	76.12	78.16	75.90	78.16		6
4	Heinz Weis	Germany	73.38	74.36	74.28	74.02	75.02	73.88	75.02		5
5	Tore Gustafsson	Sweden	x	71.16	68.96	x	x	x	71.16		4
6	Enrico Sgrulletti	Italy	x	x	70.62	70.48	70.72	70.28	70.72		3
7	Peter Vivian	Great Britain	66.34	x	68.44	67.78	x	x	68.44		2
8	Cosmin Sorescu	Romania	57.42	55.92	59.72	59.68	x	58.30	59.72		1

=== Javelin throw ===
25 June

Rank	Name	Nationality	#1	#2	#3	#4	#5	#6	Result	Notes	Points
1	Andrey Moruyev	Russia	87.34	–	–	x	–	x	87.34		8
2	Raymond Hecht	Germany	85.40	85.36	82.66	84.14	82.66	83.16	85.40		7
3	Mick Hill	Germany	84.12	x	x	83.94	84.52	85.28	85.28		6
4	Patrik Boden	Sweden	81.68	79.90	79.94	83.82	81.56	79.24	83.82		5
5	Alain Storaci	France	71.72	69.78	72.36	73.28	71.12	71.74	73.44		4
6	Moreno Belletti	Italy	71.72	69.78	72.36	73.28	71.12	71.74	73.28		3
7	Andriy Maznichenko	Ukraine	68.40	70.32	x	67.74	68.02	70.14	70.32		2
8	Dorel Greta	Romania	63.28	x	x	66.52	62.84	60.20	66.52		1

== Women's results ==
=== 100 metres ===
25 June
Wind: +0.8 m/s

Rank	Name	Nationality	Time	Notes	Points
1	Zhanna Tarnopolskaya	Ukraine	11.26		8
2	Katharine Merry	Great Britain	11.34		7
3	Melanie Paschke	Germany	11.37		6
4	Oksana Dyachenko	Russia	11.50		5
5	Sandra Myers	Spain	11.54		4
6	Frédérique Bangué	France	11.64		3
7	Margarita Molchan	Belarus	11.78		2
8	Erica Niculae	Romania	11.89		1

=== 200 metres ===
26 June
Wind: +2.9 m/s

Rank	Name	Nationality	Time	Notes	Points
1	Silke Knoll	Germany	23.04		8
2	Katharine Merry	Great Britain	23.38		7
3	Oksana Dyachenko	Russia	23.65		6
4	Viktoriya Fomenko	Ukraine	23.87		5
5	Sandra Myers	Spain	23.98		4
6	Fabienne Ficher	France	24.10		3
7	Natalya Vinogradova	Belarus	24.25		2
8	Ionela Târlea	Romania	24.52		1

=== 400 metres ===
25 June

Rank	Name	Nationality	Time	Notes	Points
1	Svetlana Goncharenko	Russia	52.08		8
2	Melanie Neef	Great Britain	52.43		7
3	Francine Landre	France	52.86		6
4	Yelena Nasonkina	Ukraine	54.16		5
5	Yolanda Reyes	Spain	54.31		4
6	Elena Vizitiu	Romania	55.00		3
7	Natalya Ignatyuk	Belarus	56.91		2
	Anja Rücker	Germany	DNF		0

=== 800 metres ===
25 June

Rank	Name	Nationality	Time	Notes	Points
1	Diane Modahl	Great Britain	2:02.81		8
2	Patricia Djaté-Taillard	France	2:02.95		7
3	Yelena Zavadskaya	Ukraine	2:04.43		6
4	Simone Weidner	Germany	2:05.12		5
5	Simone Weidner	Romania	2:05.56		4
6	Tamara Kupriyanovich	Belarus	2:05.95		3
7	Yelena Afanasyeva	Russia	2:06.51		2
8	Dolores Rodríguez	Spain	2:08.60		1

=== 1500 metres ===
26 June

Rank	Name	Nationality	Time	Notes	Points
1	Lyubov Kremlyova	Russia	4:05.97		8
2	Kelly Holmes	Great Britain	4:06.48		7
3	Violeta Beclea	Romania	4:09.26		6
4	Ellen Kiessling	Germany	4:10.82		5
5	Yelena Storchovaya	Ukraine	4:13.56		4
6	Laurence Vivier	France	4:17.00		3
7	Maite Zúñiga	Spain	4:19.77		2
8	Oksana Mernikova	Belarus	4:49.04		1

=== 3000 metres ===
25 June

Rank	Name	Nationality	Time	Notes	Points
1	Lyudmila Borisova	Russia	8:52.21		8
2	Farida Fatès	France	8:53.40		7
3	Sonia McGeorge	Great Britain	8:55.47		6
4	Tatyana Byelovol	Ukraine	9:06.49		5
5	Estela Estévez	Spain	9:08.24		4
6	Yelena Mazovka	Belarus	9:13.76		3
7	Margareta Keszeg	Romania	9:17.62		2
8	Andrea Karhoff	Germany	9:19.35		1

=== 10,000 metres ===
26 June

Rank	Name	Nationality	Time	Notes	Points
1	Kathrin Wessel	Germany	32:26.85		8
2	Rosario Murcia	France	32:59.80		7
3	Rocío Ríos	Spain	33:22.18		6
4	Nadezhda Gallyamova	Russia	33:25.62		5
5	Iulia Negură	Romania	33:33.40		4
6	Vikki McPherson	Great Britain	34:03.07		3
7	Natalya Galushko	Belarus	34:55.62		2
8	Natalya Vorobyeva	Ukraine	35:47.39		1

=== 100 metres hurdles ===
26 June
Wind: -1.4 m/s

Rank	Name	Nationality	Time	Notes	Points
1	Jacqui Agyepong	Great Britain	13.00		8
2	Yuliya Graudyn	Russia	13.07		7
3	Anne Piquereau	France	13.21		6
4	Nadezhda Bodrova	Ukraine	13.22		5
5	Caren Jung	Germany	13.39		4
6	María José Mardomingo	Spain	13.43		3
7	Erica Niculae	Romania	13.60		2
8	Irina Mylnikova	Belarus	13.78		1

=== 400 metres hurdles ===
25 June

Rank	Name	Nationality	Time	Notes	Points
1	Sally Gunnell	Great Britain	54.62		8
2	Tatyana Tereshchuk	Ukraine	55.04		7
3	Tatyana Kurochkina	Belarus	56.02		6
4	Vera Ordina	Russia	56.13		5
5	Heike Meissner	Germany	56.23		4
6	Carole Nelson	France	57.97		3
7	Ionela Târlea	Romania	58.62		2
8	Esther Lahoz	Spain	58.69		1

=== 4 × 100 metres relay ===
25 June

Rank	Nation	Athletes	Time	Note	Points
1	Ukraine	Irina Slyusar, Viktoriya Fomenko, Anzhela Kravchenko, Zhanna Tarnopolskaya	43.38		8
2	Great Britain	Stephi Douglas, Katharine Merr, Simmone Jacobs, Paula Thomas	43.46		7
3	Germany	Bettina Zipp, Silke Lichtenhagen, Silke Knoll, Melanie Paschke	44.24		6
4	Russia	Nadezhda Rashchupkina, Oksana Dyachenko, Marina Zhirova, Natalya Merzlyakova	44.43		5
5	Belarus	Natalya Zukh, Natalya Vinogradova, Tatyana Starinskaya, Margarita Molchan	45.64		4
6	Spain	Carme Blay, Carmen García-Campero, Patricia Morales, Yolanda Díaz	45.90		3
7	Romania	Lia Murgu, Erica Niculae, Mirela Dulgheru, Ionela Târlea	46.19		2
	France	Patricia Girard, Odiah Sidibe, Fabienne Ficher, Frédérique Bangué	DNF		0

=== 4 × 400 metres relay ===
25 June

Rank	Nation	Athletes	Time	Note	Points
1	Great Britain	Melanie Neef, Tracy Goddard, Phylis Smith, Sally Gunnell	3:27.33		8
2	Germany	Jana Schönenberger, Uta Rohländer, Angelika Haggenmüller, Heike Meißner	3:27.78		7
3	Russia	Yelena Golesheva, Vera Sychugova, Yelena Andreyeva, Svetlana Goncharenko	3:28.85		6
4	Ukraine	Yana Manuylova, Viktoriya Miloserdova, Lyudmila Kashchey, Yelena Nasonkina	3:31.05		5
5	France	Marie-Line Scholent, Marie-Louise Bevis, Francine Landre, Evelyne Elien	3:32.00		4
6	Belarus	Anna Kozak, Natalya Ignatyuk, Tatyana Kurochkina, Tamara Kupriyanovich	3:33.25		3
7	Romania	Nicoleta Căruțașu, Laura Itcou, Elena Vizitiu, Magdalena Nedelcu	3:33.39		2
8	Spain	Blanca Lacambra, Yolanda Reyes, Mireia Lluch, Esther Lahoz	3:38.20		1

=== High jump ===
26 June

Rank	Name	Nationality	1.70	1.75	1.80	1.85	1.88	1.91	1.94	1.97	Result	Notes	Points
1	Tatyana Shevchik	Belarus	–	–	–	o	o	xo	xo	xxx	1.94		8
2	Monica Iagăr	Romania	–	o	o	o	o	xxo	xxx		1.91		7
3	Yelena Gulyayeva	Russia	–	–	o	xo	o	xxx			1.88		6
4	Marion Hellmann	Germany	–	–	o	xo	o	xxx			1.88		5
5	Mari Mar Martínez	Spain	o	o	o	xo	xxx				1.85		4
6	Julia Bennett	Great Britain	–	o	o	xxo	xxx				1.85		3
7	Iryna Mykhalchenko	Ukraine	–	o	xo	xxx					1.80		2
8	Maryse Maury	France	–	o	xxo	xr					1.80		1

=== Long jump ===
26 June

Rank	Name	Nationality	#1	#2	#3	#4	#5	#6	Result	Notes	Points
1	Heike Drechsler	Germany	6.81	6.99	x	x	x	x	6.99		8
2	Olga Rublyova	Russia	6.53	6.14	6.65	6.14	6.52	6.63	6.65		7
3	Larisa Kuchinskaya	Belarus	x	6.39	6.51	6.32	6.54	6.54	6.54		6
4	Yelena Semiraz	Ukraine	6.09	6.25	6.50	6.23	x	6.54	6.54		5
5	Denise Lewis	Great Britain	6.29	x	6.42	6.22	x	5.60	6.42		4
6	Mirela Dulgheru	Romania	6.21	x	6.39	6.23	6.22	x	6.39		3
7	Anastasia Mahob	France	6.07	5.96	5.92	x	3.27	6.18	6.18		2
8	Yolanda Rodríguez	Spain	5.98	6.03	5.80	5.76	6.11	6.01	6.11		1

=== Triple jump ===
25 June

Rank	Name	Nationality	#1	#2	#3	#4	#5	#6	Result	Notes	Points
1	Helga Radtke	Germany	13.44	13.90	13.74	x	x	13.61	13.90		8
2	Rodica Petrescu	Romania	13.71	13.66	13.42	13.48	13.72	13.83	13.83		7
3	Concepción Paredes	Spain	13.50	x	13.28	13.75	13.81	13.81	13.81		6
4	Michelle Griffith	Great Britain	13.20	13.25	13.40	13.44	x	13.75	13.75		5
5	Natalya Klimovets	Belarus	12.69	13.49	x	13.30	13.16	x	13.49		4
6	Viktoriya Vershynina	Ukraine	x	13.18	x	13.43	x	13.43	13.43		3
7	Valerie Guiyoule	France	13.10	13.38	x	13.29	13.21	13.36	13.38		2
8	Olga Rublyova	Russia	13.32	x	12.72	–	–	–	13.32		1

=== Shot put ===
26 June

Rank	Name	Nationality	#1	#2	#3	#4	#5	#6	Result	Notes	Points
1	Astrid Kumbernuss	Germany	19.63	19.47	x	19.20	19.09	–	19.63		8
2	Valentina Fedyushina	Ukraine	18.19	x	19.30	19.17	x	x	19.30		7
3	Larisa Peleshenko	Russia	x	18.18	18.64	18.86	x	x	18.86		6
4	Judy Oakes	Great Britain	17.33	17.62	17.69	x	x	17.75	17.75		5
5	Mihaela Oana	Romania	16.32	17.29	x	x	x	x	17.29		4
6	Natalya Gurskaya	Belarus	16.49	16.82	16.62	16.70	16.70	x	16.82		3
7	Margarita Ramos	Spain	16.59	x	x	x	15.95	16.51	16.59		2
8	Annick Lefebvre	France	15.22	x	14.96	–	x	x	15.22		1

=== Discus throw ===
25 June

Rank	Name	Nationality	#1	#2	#3	#4	#5	#6	Result	Notes	Points
1	Ilke Wyludda	Germany	63.82	64.72	65.78	68.36	63.52	66.74	68.36		8
2	Olga Nikishina	Ukraine	59.58	59.92	61.94	63.48	59.14	59.92	63.48		7
3	Ellina Zvereva	Belarus	61.24	62.92	61.90	x	61.50	61.22	62.92		6
4	Larisa Korotkevich	Russia	57.50	60.18	x	56.78	x	56.36	60.18		5
5	Manuela Tirneci	Romania	x	x	58.56	x	57.44	x	58.56		4
6	Jackie McKernan	Great Britain	x	55.26	54.46	55.30	53.24	52.60	55.30		3
7	Ángeles Barreiro	Spain	47.82	51.22	51.88	53.88	51.16	53.24	53.88		2
8	Agnès Teppe	France	x	47.82	50.22	x	48.28	x	50.22		1

=== Javelin throw ===
26 June – Old model

Rank	Name	Nationality	#1	#2	#3	#4	#5	#6	Result	Notes	Points
1	Natalya Shikolenko	Belarus	64.76	x	68.16	69.00	65.14	–	69.00		8
2	Karen Forkel	Germany	61.08	59.50	x	65.58	x	65.54	65.58		7
3	Felicia Țilea	Romania	x	54.64	59.86	x	63.88	59.06	63.88		6
4	Yekaterina Ivakina	Russia	x	57.20	63.14	59.62	58.88	54.80	63.14		5
5	Nadine Auzeil	France	54.90	55.28	57.16	57.02	x	58.28	58.28		4
6	Irina Kostyuchenkova	Ukraine	55.84	54.50	x	56.48	54.44	x	56.48		3
7	Belén Palacios	Spain	x	50.10	49.92	47.40	x	47.72	50.10		2
8	Karen Costello	Great Britain	49.24	47.88	x	42.52	45.18	49.12	49.24		1
