= 1997 European Cup Super League =

These are the full results of the 1997 European Cup Super League in athletics which was held on 21 and 22 June 1997 at the Olympic Stadium in Munich, Germany.

== Team standings ==
Men
Pos.	Nation	Points
1	Great Britain	118
2	Germany	105
3	Russia	104
4	Italy	96
5	Spain	78
6	France	75
7	Norway	72.5
8	Greece	71.5

Women
Pos.	Nation	Points
1	Russia	127
2	Germany	113
3	Great Britain	86
4	Italy	77
5	France	77
6	Ukraine	76
7	Romania	72
8	Belarus	55

== Men's results ==
=== 100 metres ===
21 June
Wind: +0.2 m/s

Rank	Name	Nationality	Time	Notes	Points
1	Linford Christie	Great Britain	10.04	=CR	8
2	Geir Moen	Norway	10.18		7
3	Andrey Fedoriv	Russia	10.19		6
4	Angelos Pavlakakis	Greece	10.24		5
5	Marc Blume	Germany	10.35		4
6	Frutos Feo	Spain	10.38		3
7	Giovanni Puggioni	Italy	10.40		2
8	Stéphane Cali	France	10.44		1

=== 200 metres ===
22 June
Wind: +0.7 m/s

Rank	Name	Nationality	Time	Notes	Points
1	Linford Christie	Great Britain	20.56		7.5
1	Georgios Panagiotopoulos	Greece	20.56		7.5
3	Geir Moen	Norway	20.60		6
4	Christophe Cheval	France	20.75		5
5	Alessandro Attene	Italy	20.89		4
6	Aleksandr Porkhomovskiy	Russia	20.92		3
7	Daniel Bittner	Germany	21.06		2
8	Jordi Mayoral	Spain	21.21		1

=== 400 metres ===
21 June

Rank	Name	Nationality	Time	Notes	Points
1	Roger Black	Great Britain	45.63		8
2	David Canal	Spain	46.28		7
3	Marco Vaccari	Italy	46.40		6
4	Innokentiy Zharov	Russia	46.42		5
5	Jean-Louis Rapnouil	France	46.54		4
6	Quincy Douglas	Norway	46.67		3
7	Jens Dautzenberg	Germany	46.79		2
8	Periklis Iakovakis	Greece	47.39		1

=== 800 metres ===
22 June

Rank	Name	Nationality	Time	Notes	Points
1	Vebjørn Rodal	Norway	1:47.54		8
2	Nico Motchebon	Germany	1:47.89		7
3	Mark Sesay	Great Britain	1:48.11		6
4	Giuseppe D'Urso	Italy	1:48.43		5
5	Andrey Loginov	Russia	1:48.64		4
6	Jimmy Jean-Joseph	France	1:48.69		3
7	Panagiotis Stroubakos	Greece	1:49.04		2
8	José Manuel Cerezo	Spain	1:49.36		1

=== 1500 metres ===
21 June

Rank	Name	Nationality	Time	Notes	Points
1	Fermín Cacho	Spain	3:37.79		8
2	Gennaro Di Napoli	Italy	3:37.81		7
3	Vyacheslav Shabunin	Russia	3:38.14		6
4	John Mayock	Great Britain	3:38.15		5
5	Rüdiger Stenzel	Germany	3:38.80		4
6	Panagiotis Stroubakos	Greece	3:39.49		3
7	Tor Øivind Ødegård	Norway	3:39.88		2
8	Mickaël Damian	France	3:41.44		2

=== 3000 metres ===
21 June

Rank	Name	Nationality	Time	Notes	Points
1	Dieter Baumann	Germany	7:41.08	CR	8
2	Manuel Pancorbo	Spain	7:41.60		7
3	Panagiotis Papoulias	Greece	7:45.65		6
4	Sergey Drygin	Russia	7:54.08		5
5	Anthony Whiteman	Great Britain	7:57.65		4
6	Abdellah Béhar	France	7:58.44		3
7	Salvatore Vincenti	Italy	8:23.40		2
8	Per Erik Vullum	Norway	8:32.21		1

=== 5000 metres ===
22 June

Rank	Name	Nationality	Time	Notes	Points
1	Gennaro Di Napoli	Italy	13:38.33		8
2	Anacleto Jiménez	Spain	13:39.42		7
3	Panagiotis Papoulias	Greece	13:40.02		6
4	Andrew Pearson	Great Britain	13:40.16		5
5	Mustapha Essaïd	France	13:42.12		4
6	Carsten Eich	Germany	13:50.41		3
7	Øyvind Fretheim	Norway	13:58.57		2
8	Aleksey Gorbunov	Russia	14:19.54		1

=== 110 metres hurdles ===
22 June
Wind: +0.2 m/s

Rank	Name	Nationality	Time	Notes	Points
1	Florian Schwarthoff	Germany	13.20		8
2	Colin Jackson	Great Britain	13.28		7
3	Andrey Kislykh	Russia	13.53		6
4	Vincent Clarico	France	13.67		5
5	Gaute Gundersen	Norway	13.70		4
6	Mauro Re	Italy	13.76		3
7	Stamatios Magos	Greece	13.97		2
8	Miguel de los Santos	Spain	14.16		1

=== 400 metres hurdles ===
21 June

Rank	Name	Nationality	Time	Notes	Points
1	Fabrizio Mori	Italy	48.93		8
2	Stéphane Diagana	France	49.15		7
3	Ruslan Mashchenko	Russia	49.74		6
4	Óscar Pitillas	Spain	51.05		5
5	Chris Rawlinson	Great Britain	51.06		4
6	Konstadinos Moumoulidis	Greece	52.01		3
7	Atle Lunn	Norway	54.09		2
8	Klaus Ehrsperger	Germany	55.13		1

=== 3000 metres steeplechase ===
22 June

Rank	Name	Nationality	Time	Notes	Points
1	Rob Hough	Great Britain	8:35.03		8
2	Alessandro Lambruschini	Italy	8:36.15		7
3	Vladimir Pronin	Russia	8:36.94		6
4	Jim Svenøy	Norway	8:37.43		5
5	Mark Ostendarp	Germany	8:37.86		4
6	Ramiro Morán	Spain	8:37.93		3
7	Adonios Vouzis	Greece	8:42.43		2
8	Ali Belghazi	France	8:43.46		1

=== 4 × 100 metres relay ===
21 June

Rank	Nation	Athletes	Time	Note	Points
1	Italy	Nicola Asuni, Giovanni Puggioni, Angelo Cipolloni, Sandro Floris	38.80		8
2	Norway	Fernando Ramirez, John Ertzgaard, Per Ivar Sivle, Geir Moen	38.96	NR	7
3	Great Britain	Jason Gardener, Marlon Devonish, Doug Walker, Ian Mackie	38.97		6
4	Germany	Marc Blume, Daniel Bittner, Andreas Ruth, Holger Blume	39.08		5
5	France	Christophe Cheval, Thierry Lubin, Oliver Théophile, Stéphane Cali	39.29		4
6	Greece	Georgios Panagiotopoulos, Alexandros Terzian, Ioannis Nafpliotis, Angelos Pavlakakis	39.33		3
7	Spain	Frutos Feo, Venancio José, Jordi Mayoral, Francisco Navarro	39.44		2
8	Russia	Stanislav Moskvin, Aleksandr Sokolov, Aleksandr Porkhomovskiy, Andrey Fedoriv	39.48		1

=== 4 × 400 metres relay ===
21 June

Rank	Nation	Athletes	Time	Note	Points
1	Great Britain	Roger Black, Jamie Baulch, Iwan Thomas, Mark Richardson	2:59.46	CR	8
2	Italy	Marco Vaccari, Alessandro Aimar, Fabrizio Mori, Ashraf Saber	3:02.60		7
3	Russia	Innokentiy Zharov, Dmitriy Kosov, Dmitriy Golovastov, Dmitriy Bey	3:03.09		6
4	France	Pierre-Marie Hilaire, Rodrigue Nordin, Frédéric Mango, Stéphane Diagana	3:03.58		5
5	Germany	Jens Dautzenberg, Daniel Bittner, Klaus Ehrsperger, Julian Voelkel	3:03.78		4
6	Spain	César Martínez, David Canal, Jon Lopetegui, Antonio Andrés	3:04.50		3
7	Greece	Evgenios Papadopoulos, Konstadinos Moumoulidis, Periklis Iakovakis, Panagiotis Sarris	3:05.88		2
8	Norway	Quincy Douglas, Jan Petter Bjørnevik, Vebjørn Rodal, Frank Fiske	3:07.31		1

=== High jump ===
21 June

Rank	Name	Nationality	2.05	2.10	2.15	2.18	2.21	2.24	2.26	2.28	2.30	2.32	Result	Notes	Points
1	Arturo Ortiz	Spain	–	–	o	–	o	–	o	–	o	xxx	2.30		8
2	Sergey Klyugin	Russia	–	–	xo	–	o	o	o	o	o	xxx	2.30		7
3	Martin Buß	Germany	–	–	o	o	o	o	xo	o	xo	xxx	2.30		6
4	Steve Smith	Great Britain	–	–	o	–	–	xo	–	o	xx–	x	2.28		4.5
4	Steinar Hoen	Norway	–	–	–	–	xo	o	o	o	x–	xx	2.28		4.5
6	Joël Vincent	France	–	o	o	–	o	o	xxx				2.24		3
7	Dimitrios Kokotis	Greece	–	o	–	o	o	x–	xx				2.21		2
8	Ivan Bernasconi	Italy	o	o	o	xxo	xxx						2.18		1

=== Pole vault ===
22 June (held indoors)

Rank	Name	Nationality	5.00	5.10	5.20	5.30	5.40	5.50	5.60	5.70	5.75	5.80	5.85	5.95	Result	Notes	Points
1	Maksim Tarasov	Russia	–	–	–	–	–	–	o	–	–	o	–	o	5.95		8
2	Jean Galfione	France	–	–	–	–	o	–	xo	–	xxo	–	xxx		5.75		7
3	Tim Lobinger	Germany	–	–	–	–	–	xo	–	o	–	–	xxx		5.70		6
4	Fabio Pizzolato	Italy	–	–	o	–	xxo	xo	xxx						5.50		5
5	Nick Buckfield	Great Britain	–	–	–	o	–	xxo	xxx						5.50		4
6	Juan Gabriel Concepción	Spain	–	xxo	–	o	–	xxx							5.30		3
7	Trond Barthel	Norway	–	–	xxo	–	xxx								5.20		2
8	Konstadinos Tzivas	Greece	o	–	–	–	xxx								5.00		1

=== Long jump ===
21 June

Rank	Name	Nationality	#1	#2	#3	#4	Result	Notes	Points
1	Kirill Sosunov	Russia	5.36	7.98	8.00	7.97	8.00		8
2	Konstandinos Koukodimos	Greece	7.71	7.81	7.88	x	7.88		7
3	Emmanuel Bangué	France	7.86	x	x	x	7.86		6
4	Konstantin Krause	Germany	7.56	7.68	7.71	7.74	7.74		5
5	Raúl Fernández	Spain	x	7.41	7.42	7.64	7.64		4
6	Steve Phillips	Great Britain	7.44	7.30	7.62	7.59w	7.62		3
7	Simone Bianchi	Italy	7.41	7.36	7.40	x	7.41		2
8	Sigurd Njerve	Norway	7.19	x	7.31	6.90	7.31		1

=== Triple jump ===
22 June

Rank	Name	Nationality	#1	#2	#3	#4	Result	Notes	Points
1	Jonathan Edwards	Great Britain	17.39	17.74	–	–	17.74		8
2	Denis Kapustin	Russia	17.21	17.24	–	16.69	17.24		7
3	Charles Michael Friedek	Germany	16.12	x	16.71	16.71	16.71		6
4	Raúl Chapado	Spain	15.86	16.26	16.06	16.17	16.26		5
5	Ketill Hanstveit	Norway	16.20	16.21	x	16.00	16.21		4
6	Paolo Camossi	Italy	16.01	x	x	16.08	16.08		3
7	Germain Martial	France	15.72	x	16.08	15.25	16.08		2
8	Hristos Meletoglou	Greece	x	15.78	x	16.00	16.00		1

=== Shot put ===
21 June

Rank	Name	Nationality	#1	#2	#3	#4	Result	Notes	Points
1	Oliver-Sven Buder	Germany	19.95	x	20.15	20.41	20.41		8
2	Corrado Fantini	Italy	18.36	19.48	19.63	19.72	19.72		7
3	Manuel Martínez	Spain	19.29	19.27	x	x	19.29		6
4	Kjell Ove Hauge	Norway	x	18.84	19.04	x	19.04		5
5	Mark Proctor	Great Britain	17.74	x	18.65	x	18.65		4
6	Alexios Leonidis	Greece	17.72	x	18.46	x	18.46		3
7	Stéphane Vial	France	17.60	17.57	17.75	x	17.75		2
8	Sergey Lyakhov	Russia	16.92	17.46	x	x	17.46		1

=== Discus throw ===
22 June

Rank	Name	Nationality	#1	#2	#3	#4	Result	Notes	Points
1	Lars Riedel	Germany	62.48	62.78	63.36	x	63.36		8
2	Robert Weir	Great Britain	60.60	61.62	60.42	58.68	61.62		7
3	Sergey Lyakhov	Russia	57.92	58.60	x	59.72	59.72		6
4	Jean Pons	France	59.56	57.96	59.60	57.56	59.60		5
5	Kjell Ove Hauge	Norway	x	56.60	x	x	56.60		4
6	Diego Fortuna	Italy	56.24	x	x	x	56.24		3
7	Hristos Papadopoulos	Greece	52.32	54.66	x	54.12	54.66		2
8	José Luis Valencia	Spain	48.52	49.54	48.68	52.34	52.34		1

=== Hammer throw ===
21 June

Rank	Name	Nationality	#1	#2	#3	#4	Result	Notes	Points
1	Heinz Weis	Germany	79.40	80.10	80.46	81.42	81.42		8
2	Vadim Khersontsev	Russia	77.46	76.94	78.48	78.48	78.48		7
3	Alexandros Papadimitriou	Greece	72.02	74.12	x	73.04	74.12		6
4	Christophe Épalle	France	x	72.98	74.12	72.06	74.12		5
5	Enrico Sgrulletti	Italy	73.08	x	–	–	73.08		4
6	Paul Head	Great Britain	68.06	x	68.36	x	68.36		3
7	José Manuel Pérez	Spain	66.32	65.66	x	67.50	67.50		2
8	Bjørn Erik Pettersen	Norway	61.56	63.06	x	62.18	63.06		1

=== Javelin throw ===
22 June

Rank	Name	Nationality	#1	#2	#3	#4	Result	Notes	Points
1	Steve Backley	Great Britain	86.86	x	x	x	86.86		8
2	Konstadinos Gatsioudis	Greece	x	82.86	85.82	86.10	86.10		7
3	Boris Henry	Germany	x	85.42	x	84.70	85.42		6
4	Sergey Makarov	Russia	83.06	84.78	78.52	x	84.78		5
5	Fabio De Gaspari	Italy	69.08	75.78	73.12	69.98	75.78		4
6	Sturle Sabo	Norway	64.64	68.14	70.72	67.28	70.72		3
7	David Brisseaud	France	67.38	65.86	68.24	70.26	70.26		2
8	Antonio Esteban	Spain	65.92	x	59.98	65.96	65.96		1

== Women's results ==
=== 100 metres ===
21 June
Wind: +0.6 m/s

Rank	Name	Nationality	Time	Notes	Points
1	Natalya Voronova	Russia	11.18		8
2	Andrea Philipp	Germany	11.23		7
3	Natalya Safronnikova	Belarus	11.41		6
4	Frédérique Bangué	France	11.48		5
5	Simmone Jacobs	Great Britain	11.55		4
6	Manuela Levorato	Italy	11.74		3
7	Viktoriya Fomenko	Ukraine	11.76		2
8	Erica Niculae	Romania	11.89		1

=== 200 metres ===
22 June
Wind: -0.2 m/s

Rank	Name	Nationality	Time	Notes	Points
1	Christine Arron	France	22.89		8
2	Andrea Philipp	Germany	22.98		7
3	Marina Trandenkova	Russia	23.16		6
4	Natalya Safronnikova	Belarus	23.36		5
5	Virna De Angeli	Italy	23.58		4
6	Simmone Jacobs	Great Britain	23.62		3
7	Olga Lysakova	Ukraine	24.14		2
8	Monika Bumbescu	Romania	24.29		1

=== 400 metres ===
21 June

Rank	Name	Nationality	Time	Notes	Points
1	Grit Breuer	Germany	50.38		8
2	Donna Fraser	Great Britain	51.51		7
3	Olga Kotlyarova	Russia	51.53		6
4	Virna De Angeli	Russia	52.30		5
5	Tatyana Movchan	Ukraine	52.56		4
6	Marie-Louise Bévis	France	53.13		3
7	Anna Kozak	Belarus	53.50		2
8	Monica Pirvu	Romania	54.87		1

=== 800 metres ===
21 June

Rank	Name	Nationality	Time	Notes	Points
1	Yelena Afanasyeva	Russia	1:59.93		8
2	Iryna Lishchynska	Ukraine	2:00.71		7
3	Linda Kisabaka	Germany	2:01.07		6
4	Carmen Stanciu	Romania	2:01.71		5
5	Natalya Dukhnova	Belarus	2:01.77		4
6	Severine Foulon	France	2:02.36		3
7	Hayley Parry	Great Britain	2:02.47		2
8	Claudia Salvarani	Italy	2:02.84		1

=== 1500 metres ===
22 June

Rank	Name	Nationality	Time	Notes	Points
1	Kelly Holmes	Great Britain	4:04.79		8
2	Gabriela Szabo	Romania	4:06.25		7
3	Irina Biryukova	Russia	4:07.98		6
4	Frédérique Quentin	France	4:12.14		5
5	Natalya Chernyshova	Ukraine	4:13.31		4
6	Sylvia Kühnemund	Germany	4:13.78		3
7	Elisa Rea	Italy	4:14.99		2
8	Yelena Bychkovskaya	Belarus	4:17.34		1

=== 3000 metres ===
22 June

Rank	Name	Nationality	Time	Notes	Points
1	Roberta Brunet	Italy	8:51.66		8
2	Kristina da Fonseca-Wollheim	Germany	8:52.20		7
3	Paula Radcliffe	Great Britain	8:52.79		6
4	Elena Fidatov	Romania	9:07.43		5
5	Blandine Bitzner	France	9:12.58		4
6	Yekaterina Podkopayeva	Russia	9:17.27		3
7	Svetlana Miroshnik	Ukraine	9:29.42		2
8	Natalya Kvachuk	Belarus	9:45.52		1

=== 5000 metres ===
21 June

Rank	Name	Nationality	Time	Notes	Points
1	Gabriela Szabo	Romania	15:02.68	CR	8
2	Roberta Brunet	Italy	15:02.87		7
3	Luminita Zaituc	Germany	15:52.95		6
4	Laurence Duquenoy	France	15:55.33		5
5	Olena Vyazova	Ukraine	15:56.26		4
6	Alla Zhilyayeva	Russia	16:02.99		3
7	Lucy Elliott	Great Britain	16:07.22		2
8	Natalya Galushko	Belarus	16:20.83		1

=== 100 metres hurdles ===
22 June
Wind: +0.7 m/s

Rank	Name	Nationality	Time	Notes	Points
1	Svetlana Laukhova	Russia	12.94		8
2	Patricia Girard	France	13.03		7
3	Angela Thorp	Great Britain	13.16		6
4	Carla Tuzzi	Italy	13.23		5
5	Liliana Nastase	Romania	13.66		4
6	Nelli Voronkova	Belarus	13.90		3
7	Heike Blassneck	Germany	14.38		2
	Oksana Kuchma	Ukraine	DQ	Doping	0

=== 400 metres hurdles ===
21 June

Rank	Name	Nationality	Time	Notes	Points
1	Sally Gunnell	Great Britain	54.57		8
2	Silvia Rieger	Germany	55.23		7
3	Yekaterina Bakhvalova	Russia	55.66		6
4	Tatyana Kurochkina	Belarus	56.19		5
5	Irina Lenskaya	Ukraine	56.47		4
6	Florence Delaune	France	57.77		3
7	Carla Barbarino	Italy	57.78		2
8	Ionela Târlea	Romania	58.14		1

=== 4 × 100 metres relay ===
21 June

Rank	Nation	Athletes	Time	Note	Points
1	Russia	Yekaterina Leshcheva, Galina Malchugina, Natalya Voronova, Marina Trandenkova	43.05		8
2	France	Frédérique Bangué, Christine Arron, Patricia Girard, Sylviane Félix	43.21		7
3	Germany	Shanta Ghosh, Gabi Rockmeier, Birgit Rockmeier, Andrea Philipp	43.25		6
4	Great Britain	Beverly Kinch, Marcia Richardson, Aileen McGillivary, Simmone Jacobs	44.37		5
5	Ukraine	Oksana Guskova, Viktoriya Fomenko, Olga Mishchenko, Iryna Pukha	44.49		4
6	Italy	Stefania Ferrante, Annarita Luciano, Giada Gallina, Manuela Levorato	44.67		3
7	Belarus	Margarita Molchan, Natalya Safronnikova, Natalia Sologub, Yelena Grigorovskaya	44.84		2
8	Romania	Monika Bumbescu, Erica Niculae, Evelina Lisenco, Monica Pirvu	45.93		1

=== 4 × 400 metres relay ===
22 June

Rank	Nation	Athletes	Time	Note	Points
1	Russia	Yekaterina Bakhvalova, Yekaterina Kulikova, Natalya Khrushcheleva, Olga Kotlyarova	3:24.10		8
2	Germany	Anke Feller, Uta Rohländer, Silvia Rieger, Anja Rücker	3:26.12		7
3	Great Britain	Allison Curbishley, Donna Fraser, Michelle Thomas, Sally Gunnell	3:26.48		6
4	Italy	Danielle Perpoli, Francesca Carbone, Patrizia Spuri, Virna De Angeli	3:28.24		5
5	Ukraine	Tatyana Movchan, Olena Buzhenko, Irina Lenskaya, Olga Moroz	3:28.49		4
6	Belarus	Yelena Konchits, Tatyana Kurochhkina, Anna Kozak, Nelli Voronkova	3:30.49		3
7	France	Sophie Domenech, Marie-Line Scholent, Marie-Louise Bévis, Marie-France Opheltes	3:31.03		2
8	Romania	Alina Rîpanu, Anca Safta, Monica Pirvu, Carmen Stanciu	3:34.69		1

=== High jump ===
22 June

Rank	Name	Nationality	1.65	1.70	1.75	1.78	1.81	1.84	1.86	1.88	1.90	1.92	1.94	1.96	Result	Notes	Points
1	Heike Balck	Germany	–	–	o	–	o	o	o	xo	xxo	xo	o	xxx	1.94		8
2	Tatyana Motkova	Russia	–	–	–	–	o	o	o	o	o	xo	x–	xx	1.92		7
3	Antonella Bevilacqua	Italy	–	–	–	–	xo	o	xo	o	xxx				1.88		6
4	Vita Styopina	Ukraine	–	o	o	o	o	o	xxo	xxx					1.86		5
5	Monica Iagar	Romania	–	–	–	–	xo	o	xxx						1.84		4
6	Debbie Marti	Great Britain	–	–	o	–	o	xxo	xxx						1.84		3
7	Marie Collonvillé	France	o	o	o	xo	o	xxo	xxx						1.84		2
8	Tatyana Khramova	Belarus	–	–	xxo	o	o	xxx							1.81		1

=== Pole vault ===
21 June

Rank	Name	Nationality	3.00	3.20	3.30	3.40	3.50	3.60	3.70	3.75	3.80	3.85	3.90	3.95	4.00	4.05	4.10	4.15	4.20	4.25	4.30	4.32	Result	Notes	Points
1	Anzhela Balakhonova	Ukraine	–	–	–	–	–	–	–	–	–	–	o	–	o	–	xxo	–	xo	o	x–	xx	4.25		8
2	Andrea Müller	Germany	–	–	–	–	–	–	–	–	–	o	–	–	xo	–	xxo	xo	o	x–	xx		4.20		7
3	Janine Whitlock	Great Britain	–	–	–	xo	–	xo	–	–	o	–	o	o	o	o	xo	xxx					4.10	NR	6
4	Marie Poissonnier	France	–	–	–	–	–	xxo	–	o	–	–	o	–	o	o	xxx						4.05		5
5	Svetlana Abramova	Russia	–	–	–	–	–	–	–	–	–	–	xo	–	xo	xo	xxx						4.05		4
6	Maria Carla Bresciani	Italy	–	–	–	–	–	xxo	–	o	–	xo	–	xo	x–	xx							3.95		3
7	Gabriela Mihalcea	Romania	–	–	–	–	xo	o	o	o	o	o	xxx										3.85		2
8	Galina Isachenko	Belarus	o	o	xxx																		3.20		1

=== Long jump ===
22 June

Rank	Name	Nationality	#1	#2	#3	#4	Result	Notes	Points
1	Fiona May	Italy	6.53	6.52	6.61	6.14	6.61		8
2	Nina Perevedentseva	Russia	6.58	6.54	6.60	x	6.60		7
3	Susen Tiedtke-Greene	Germany	6.42	x	6.57	6.45	6.57		6
4	Denise Lewis	Great Britain	6.44	6.55	6.35	6.56	6.56		5
5	Linda Ferga	France	6.42	6.27	6.42	6.41	6.42		4
6	Yelena Lemeshevskaya	Belarus	6.19	6.34	x	6.30	6.34		3
7	Larisa Berezhnaya	Ukraine	6.34	x	6.16	x	6.34		2
8	Monica Toth	Romania	6.26	6.24	x	6.05	6.26		1

=== Triple jump ===
21 June

Rank	Name	Nationality	#1	#2	#3	#4	Result	Notes	Points
1	Inna Lasovskaya	Russia	x	14.91	–	–	14.91		8
2	Rodica Mateescu	Romania	14.23	14.53	14.14	x	14.53		7
3	Ashia Hansen	Great Britain	14.52	x	x	x	14.52		6
4	Olena Govorova	Ukraine	x	14.06	14.05	x	14.06		5
5	Zhanna Gureyeva	Belarus	13.81	13.85	13.61	x	13.85		4
6	Petra Lobinger	Germany	x	13.85	x	13.54	13.85		3
7	Barbara Lah	Italy	x	13.66	13.42	13.57	13.66		2
8	Betty Lise	France	13.59	x	13.11	13.56	13.59		1

=== Shot put ===
22 June

Rank	Name	Nationality	#1	#2	#3	#4	Result	Notes	Points
1	Astrid Kumbernuss	Germany	20.64	20.37	19.80	–	20.64		8
2	Irina Korzhanenko	Russia	x	18.18	x	18.00	18.18		7
3	Mara Rosolen	Italy	16.21	16.30	17.17	17.28	17.28		6
4	Nadezhda Lukyniv	Ukraine	16.07	16.91	17.02	x	17.02		5
5	Elena Hila	Romania	15.83	16.15	16.71	16.95	16.95		4
6	Tatyana Khorkhuleva	Belarus	16.83	16.71	x	x	16.83		3
7	Myrtle Augee	Great Britain	16.65	x	16.74	16.67	16.74		2
8	Laurence Manfredi	France	x	16.58	x	16.43	16.58		1

=== Discus throw ===
21 June

Rank	Name	Nationality	#1	#2	#3	#4	Result	Notes	Points
1	Natalya Sadova	Russia	65.70	65.10	67.72	63.70	67.72		8
2	Franka Dietzsch	Germany	57.96	61.72	60.92	61.14	61.72		7
3	Olena Antonova	Ukraine	60.16	59.28	57.64	59.80	60.16		6
4	Nicoleta Grasu	Romania	59.16	59.72	60.02	x	60.02		5
5	Isabelle Devaluez	France	57.04	x	58.04	58.52	58.52		4
6	Agnese Maffeis	Italy	58.22	58.02	57.02	x	58.22		3
7	Lyudmila Filimonova	Belarus	51.42	53.88	56.40	54.58	56.40		2
8	Jackie McKernan	Great Britain	54.40	x	x	x	54.40		1

=== Hammer throw ===
22 June

Rank	Name	Nationality	#1	#2	#3	#4	Result	Notes	Points
1	Olga Kuzenkova	Russia	71.22	73.10	x	x	73.10	WR	8
2	Mihaela Melinte	Romania	53.04	69.04	69.50	69.76	69.76		7
3	Lyudmilla Gubkina	Belarus	63.70	64.04	68.24	x	68.24		6
4	Lyn Sprules	Great Britain	48.10	57.02	57.68	60.10	60.10		5
5	Cécile Lignot	France	55.62	x	57.62	58.26	58.26		4
6	Natalya Kunitskaya	Ukraine	54.86	57.72	56.26	x	57.72		3
7	Simone Mathes	Germany	56.12	x	x	x	56.12		2
8	Marina Tranchina	Italy	x	x	49.38	56.10	56.10		1

=== Javelin throw ===
21 June – Old model

Rank	Name	Nationality	#1	#2	#3	#4	Result	Notes	Points
1	Oksana Ovchinnikova	Russia	x	58.10	67.16	x	67.16		8
2	Felicia Tilea	Romania	62.50	64.78	64.98	59.22	64.98		7
3	Tanja Damaske	Germany	64.72	–	–	60.06	64.72		6
4	Olga Ivankova	Ukraine	57.20	55.96	x	54.36	57.20		5
5	Nadine Auzeil	France	49.02	54.36	54.02	56.38	56.38		4
6	Claudia Coslovich	Italy	53.12	53.48	52.84	53.80	53.80		3
7	Alina Serdyuk	Belarus	47.32	x	52.84	x	52.84		2
8	Sharon Gibson	Great Britain	43.64	49.72	48.40	50.20	50.20		1
