= 1994 European Athletics Championships – Men's 4 × 100 metres relay =

Men's 4 × 100 metres relay at the European Athletics Championships

The men's 4 × 100 metres relay event at the 1994 European Athletics Championships was held in Helsinki, Finland, at Helsinki Olympic Stadium on 13 August 1994.

== Medalists ==
Gold	Hermann Lomba; Daniel Sangouma; Jean-Charles Trouabal; Éric Perrot; France
Silver	Sergey Osovic; Dmitriy Vanyaikin; Oleg Kramarenko; Vladislav Dologodin; Ukraine
Bronze	Ezio Madonia; Domenico Nettis; Giorgio Marras; Sandro Floris; Italy

== Results ==
=== Final ===
13 August

Rank	Nation	Competitors	Time	Notes
1st place, gold medalist(s)	France	Hermann Lomba; Daniel Sangouma; Jean-Charles Trouabal; Éric Perrot	38.57	
2nd place, silver medalist(s)	Ukraine	Sergey Osovic; Dmitriy Vanyaikin; Oleg Kramarenko; Vladislav Dologodin	38.98	
3rd place, bronze medalist(s)	Italy	Ezio Madonia; Domenico Nettis; Giorgio Marras; Sandro Floris	38.99	
4	Sweden	Peter Karlsson; Matias Ghansah; Lars Hedner; Torbjörn Eriksson	39.05	
5	Greece	Aléxandros Yenovélis; Yeóryios Panayiotópoulos; Aléxios Alexópoulos; Aléxandros Terzián	39.25	
6	Germany	Holger Blume; Steffen Görmer; Michael Huke; Marc Blume	39.36	
7	Finland	Lasse Juusela; Tero Ridanpää; Ari Pakarinen; Pertti Purola	39.80	
	Russia	Andrey Fedoriv; Alex Porkhomovskiy; Oleg Fatun; Andrey Grigoryev	DQ	

=== Heats ===
13 August

==== Heat 1 ====
Rank	Nation	Competitors	Time	Notes
1	Ukraine	Sergey Osovic; Dmitriy Vanyaikin; Oleg Kramarenko; Vladislav Dologodin	39.04	Q
2	Italy	Ezio Madonia; Domenico Nettis; Giorgio Marras; Sandro Floris	39.22	Q
3	Russia	Andrey Fedoriv; Alex Porkhomovskiy; Andrey Grigoryev; Viktor Malchugin	39.49	Q
4	Norway	Erlend Sæterstøl; Per Ivar Sivle; Geir Moen; Gaute Melby Gundersen	39.80	
	United Kingdom	Jason John; Tony Jarrett; Darren Braithwaite; Linford Christie	DNF	

==== Heat 2 ====
Rank	Nation	Competitors	Time	Notes
1	France	Hermann Lomba; Daniel Sangouma; Jean-Charles Trouabal; Éric Perrot	38.77	Q
2	Greece	Aléxandros Yenovélis; Yeóryios Panayiotópoulos; Aléxios Alexópoulos; Aléxandros Terzián	39.34	Q
3	Germany	Holger Blume; Steffen Görmer; Michael Huke; Marc Blume	39.35	Q
4	Sweden	Peter Karlsson; Matias Ghansah; Torbjörn Eriksson; Thomas Leandersson	39.47	q
5	Finland	Lasse Juusela; Tero Ridanpää; Ari Pakarinen; Pertti Purola	39.58	q
6	Spain	Luis Turón; Frutos Feo; Juan Jesús Trapero; Pedro Pablo Nolet	40.01	

== Participation ==
According to an unofficial count, 46 athletes from 11 countries participated in the event.

- Finland (4)
- France (4)
- Germany (4)
- Greece (4)
- Italy (4)
- Norway (4)
- Russia (5)
- Spain (4)
- Sweden (5)
- Ukraine (4)
- United Kingdom (4)
