= 1993 World Championships in Athletics – Men's 200 metres =

Men's 200 metres at the 1993 World Championships
- Venue: Gottlieb Daimler Stadium
- Dates: 17 August (heats); 19 August (quarter-finals and semi-finals); 20 August (final)
- Competitors: 87
- Winning time: 19.85 CR

Medalists
gold medal	Frankie Fredericks	Namibia
silver medal	John Regis	Great Britain
bronze medal	Carl Lewis	United States

These are the official results of the Men's 200 metres event at the 1993 IAAF World Championships in Stuttgart, Germany. There were a total number of 87 participating athletes, with nine qualifying heats and the final held on Friday 20th August 1993. The winning margin was 0.09 seconds.

== Final ==
RANK	FINAL	TIME
	Frankie Fredericks (NAM)	19.85
	John Regis (GBR)	19.94
	Carl Lewis (USA)	19.99
4.	Michael Marsh (USA)	20.18
5.	Dean Capobianco (AUS)	20.18
6.	Jean-Charles Trouabal (FRA)	20.20
7.	Emmanuel Tuffour (GHA)	20.49
8.	Damien Marsh (AUS)	20.56

== Semifinals ==
- Held on 1993-08-19

RANK	HEAT 1	TIME
1.	Michael Marsh (USA)	20.10
2.	Frankie Fredericks (NAM)	20.11
3.	John Regis (GBR)	20.16
4.	Dean Capobianco (AUS)	20.21
5.	Nelson Boateng (GHA)	20.61
6.	Robert Kurnicki (GER)	20.67
7.	Atlee Mahorn (CAN)	20.80
—	Johan Rossouw (RSA)	DSQ

RANK	HEAT 2	TIME
1.	Carl Lewis (USA)	20.26
2.	Jean-Charles Trouabal (FRA)	20.27
3.	Emmanuel Tuffour (GHA)	20.44
4.	Damien Marsh (AUS)	20.51
5.	Andrey Fedoriv (RUS)	20.66
6.	David Dolle (SUI)	20.70
7.	Jason Hendrix (USA)	20.99
—	Robson Caetano da Silva (BRA)	DSQ

== Quarterfinals ==
- Held on Thursday 1993-08-19

RANK	HEAT 1	TIME
1.	David Dollé (SUI)	20.45
2.	Emmanuel Tuffour (GHA)	20.58
3.	Robert Kurnicki (GER)	20.58
4.	Jason Hendrix (USA)	20.82
5.	Raymond Stewart (JAM)	21.02
6.	Koji Ito (JPN)	21.04
7.	Torbjörn Eriksson (SWE)	21.07
	Daniel Effiong (NGR)	DNF

RANK	HEAT 2	TIME
1.	Carl Lewis (USA)	20.21
2.	John Regis (GBR)	20.39
3.	Johan Rossouw (RSA)	20.58
4.	Andrey Fedoriv (RUS)	20.59
5.	Patrick Delice (TRI)	20.88
6.	Geir Moen (NOR)	20.99
7.	Stanislav Georgiev (BUL)	21.03
8.	Kennedy Ondiek (KEN)	21.50

RANK	HEAT 3	TIME
1.	Frank Fredericks (NAM)	20.24
2.	Robson Caetano da Silva (BRA)	20.24
3.	Jean-Charles Trouabal (FRA)	20.40
4.	Damien Marsh (AUS)	20.58
5.	Glenroy Gilbert (CAN)	20.81
6.	Giorgio Marras (ITA)	20.87
7.	Patrick Stevens (BEL)	21.07
8.	Nikolay Antonov (BUL)	39.46

RANK	HEAT 4	TIME
1.	Michael Marsh (USA)	20.40
2.	Dean Capobianco (AUS)	20.44
3.	Nelson Boateng (GHA)	20.69
4.	Atlee Mahorn (CAN)	20.70
5.	Oleg Fatun (RUS)	20.92
6.	Alexandros Terzian (GRE)	21.00
7.	Joseph Gikonyo (KEN)	21.09
8.	Sidnei Telles De Souza (BRA)	21.69

== Qualifying heats ==
- Held on Tuesday 1993-08-17

RANK	HEAT 1	TIME
1.	Daniel Effiong (NGR)	20.53
2.	Johan Rossouw (RSA)	20.58
3.	Damien Marsh (AUS)	20.73
4.	Björn Sinnhuber (GER)	20.99
5.	Edgardo Guilbe (PUR)	21.14
6.	Yousef Dehmiri (IRI)	21.88
7.	Theodore Haba (GUI)	21.92
8.	Lam Hai Van (VIE)	22.77

RANK	HEAT 2	TIME
1.	Dean Capobianco (AUS)	20.52
2.	Frank Fredericks (NAM)	20.65
3.	Raymond Stewart (JAM)	20.85
4.	Nikolay Antonov (BUL)	20.88
5.	Ousmane Diarra (MLI)	21.51
6.	Derry Pemberton (ISV)	21.89
7.	David Nkoua (CGO)	22.55
	Claus Hirsbro (DEN)	DNS

RANK	HEAT 3	TIME
1.	David Dollé (SUI)	20.67
2.	Oleg Fatun (RUS)	20.71
3.	Jason Hendrix (USA)	20.74
4.	Koji Ito (JPN)	20.96
5.	Pedro Pablo Nolet (ESP)	21.09
6.	Daniel Cojocaru (ROM)	21.13
7.	Trevor Davis (AIA)	21.49
8.	Mario Bonello (MLT)	22.60

RANK	HEAT 4	TIME
1.	Carl Lewis (USA)	20.45
2.	Nelson Boateng (GHA)	20.53
3.	Andrey Fedoriv (RUS)	20.73
4.	Oumar Loum (SEN)	21.12
5.	Mark Keddell (NZL)	21.28
6.	Edmund Estaphane (LCA)	21.53
7.	A. Tamba (LBR)	22.67
	Marek Zalewski (POL)	DNS

RANK	HEAT 5	TIME
1.	Glenroy Gilbert (CAN)	20.87
2.	Patrick Delice (TRI)	20.97
3.	Joseph Gikonyo (KEN)	21.14
4.	Jiri Valik (CZE)	21.20
5.	Slobodan Branković (IWP)	21.35
6.	Golam Ambia (BAN)	21.95
7.	Arfin Abdullah (INA)	22.29
	Michael Huke (GER)	DQ

RANK	HEAT 6	TIME
1.	Robson Caetano da Silva (BRA)	20.54
2.	Emmanuel Tuffour (GHA)	20.57
3.	Robert Kurnicki (GER)	20.66
4.	Torbjörn Eriksson (SWE)	20.80
5.	Kennedy Ondiek (KEN)	20.97
6.	Edsel Chase (BAR)	21.34
7.	Miguel Janssen (ARU)	21.51
8.	Eswort Coombs (VIN)	21.82

RANK	HEAT 7	TIME
1.	Jean-Charles Trouabal (FRA)	20.60
2.	John Regis (GBR)	20.67
3.	Alexandros Terzian (GRE)	20.83
4.	Giorgio Marras (ITA)	20.95
5.	André da Silva (BRA)	20.99
6.	Niti Piyipan (THA)	21.60
7.	Khalid Juma (BHR)	22.23
8.	Ricky Canon (NRU)	24.14

RANK	HEAT 8	TIME
1.	Patrick Stevens (BEL)	20.85
2.	Stanislav Georgiev (BUL)	21.08
3.	Sidnei Telles de Souza (BRA)	21.22
4.	Stephen Lewis (MSR)	21.36
5.	Cephas Lemba (ZAM)	21.68
6.	Junior Cornette (GUY)	22.03
7.	Mark Sherwin (COK)	22.82
	Linford Christie (GBR)	DNS

RANK	HEAT 9	TIME
1.	Michael Marsh (USA)	20.77
2.	Atlee Mahorn (CAN)	20.89
3.	Geir Moen (NOR)	21.18
4.	Ato Boldon (TRI)	21.31
5.	Carlos Moreno (CHI)	21.36
6.	Amar Hacini (ALG)	21.36
7.	Edvin Ivanov (RUS)	21.39

== See also ==
- 1992 Men's Olympic 200 metres
