= 1992 European Athletics Indoor Championships – Men's 200 metres =

The men's 200 metres event at the 1992 European Athletics Indoor Championships was held in Palasport di Genova on 29 February and 1 March.

== Medalists ==
Gold	Silver	Bronze
Nikolay Antonov; Bulgaria	Daniel Sangouma; France	Aleksandr Goremykin; Unified Team

== Results ==
=== Heats ===
First 2 from each heat (Q) and the next 2 fastest (q) qualified for the semifinals.

Rank	Heat	Name	Nationality	Time	Notes
1	4	Stéphane Diagana	France	20.81	Q
2	2	Nikolay Antonov	Bulgaria	20.98	Q
3	5	Stefano Tilli	Italy	20.99	Q
4	3	Daniel Sangouma	France	21.08	Q
5	4	Marcus Adam	Great Britain	21.10	Q
6	3	Giorgio Marras	Italy	21.11	Q
7	3	Marek Zalewski	Poland	21.14	q
8	4	Jiří Valík	Czechoslovakia	21.18	q
9	1	Robert Maćkowiak	Poland	21.20	Q
10	1	Aleksandr Goremykin	Unified Team	21.20	Q
11	5	Geir Moen	Norway	21.21	Q
12	5	Alexander Lack	Germany	21.32	
13	5	Andreas Berger	Austria	21.33	
14	1	Michael Huke	Germany	21.38	
14	2	Daniel Cojocaru	Romania	21.38	Q
16	4	Torbjörn Eriksson	Sweden	21.40	
17	2	Pascal Thurnherr	Switzerland	21.46	
18	3	Luís Cunha	Portugal	21.62	
19	3	Kastytis Klimas	Lithuania	21.68	
20	1	Kevin Widmer	Switzerland	21.81	
21	4	Frank Perri	Netherlands	21.88	
22	5	Cengiz Kavaklıoğlu	Turkey	21.93	
23	1	Aldo Canti	San Marino	21.95	NR
	2	Sandro Floris	Italy	DNS	
	2	Thomas Renner	Austria	DNS	

=== Semifinals ===
First 3 from each semifinal qualified directly (Q) for the final.

Rank	Heat	Name	Nationality	Time	Notes
1	1	Nikolay Antonov	Bulgaria	20.72	Q
2	1	Aleksandr Goremykin	Unified Team	20.82	Q
3	1	Daniel Sangouma	France	20.98	Q
4	2	Stéphane Diagana	France	21.06	Q
5	1	Stefano Tilli	Italy	21.10	
6	2	Robert Maćkowiak	Poland	21.24	Q
7	2	Giorgio Marras	Italy	21.26	Q
8	2	Marcus Adam	Great Britain	21.41	
9	1	Daniel Cojocaru	Romania	21.61	
10	1	Marek Zalewski	Poland	21.66	
11	2	Geir Moen	Norway	21.68	
12	2	Jiří Valík	Czechoslovakia	22.29	

=== Final ===
Rank	Name	Nationality	Time	Notes
1st place, gold medalist(s)	Nikolay Antonov	Bulgaria	20.41	NR
2nd place, silver medalist(s)	Daniel Sangouma	France	20.64	
3rd place, bronze medalist(s)	Aleksandr Goremykin	Unified Team	21.09	
4	Giorgio Marras	Italy	21.15	
5	Robert Maćkowiak	Poland	21.38	
6	Stéphane Diagana	France	21.53	
