= 1996 European Cup (athletics) =

- Dates: 1–2 June (Super Leagues); 28–29 June (First Leagues); 29–30 June (Second Leagues)
- Host city: Madrid, Spain
- Level: Senior
- Type: Outdoor
- Events: 37

The 1996 European Cup was the 17th edition of the European Cup of athletics.

It was the last edition to allow athletes six attempts in the throws and horizontal jumps, as this number was reduced to four from the next edition. The Super League Finals were held in Madrid, Spain.

== Super League ==
Held on 1 and 2 June in Madrid, Spain

=== Team standings ===
Men
Pos.	Nation	Points
1	Germany	142
2	Great Britain	125
3	Italy	110
4	Spain	106
5	Russia	103
6	France	93.5
7	Ukraine	84
8	Sweden	75.5
9	Finland	53

Women
Pos.	Nation	Points
1	Germany	115
2	Russia	97
3	Belarus	79
4	Ukraine	78
5	France	75
6	Great Britain	73
7	Spain	49
8	Bulgaria	46

=== Results summary ===
==== Men's events ====
Event	Gold		Silver		Bronze	
100 m (Wind: +0.8 m/s)	Linford Christie; Great Britain	10.04; CR	Marc Blume; Germany	10.25	Vladislav Dologodin; Ukraine	10.26
200 m (Wind: +2.5 m/s)	Linford Christie; Great Britain	20.25w	Vladislav Dologodin; Ukraine	20.39w	Torbjörn Eriksson; Sweden	20.45w
400 m	Uwe Jahn; Germany	45.64	Du'aine Ladejo; Great Britain	45.72	Jean-Louis Rapnouil; France	45.96
800 m	Roberto Parra; Spain	1:44.97; CR	Giuseppe D'Urso; Italy	1:45.27	Nico Motchebon; Germany	1:45.98
1500 m	Fermín Cacho; Spain	3:40.24	Rüdiger Stenzel; Germany	3:40.53	Anthony Whiteman; Great Britain	3:41.21
3000 m	Dieter Baumann; Germany	7:57.19	Isaac Viciosa; Spain	7:57.80	Alessandro Lambruschini; Italy	7:58.44
5000 m	Gennaro Di Napoli; Italy	13:52.34	Manuel Pancorbo; Spain	13:55.18	Abdellah Béhar; France	13:57.15
3000 m steeplechase	Steffen Brand; Germany	8:30.09	Angelo Carosi; Italy	8:32.50	Justin Chaston; Great Britain	8:33.59
110 m hurdles (Wind: -0.3 m/s)	Florian Schwarthoff; Germany	13.20	Colin Jackson; Great Britain	13.63	Yevgeniy Pechonkin; Russia	13.64
400 m hurdles	Fabrizio Mori; Italy	49.45	Jon Ridgeon; Great Britain	49.84	Sven Nylander; Sweden	50.18
4 × 100 m	Ukraine; Kostyantyn Rurak; Sergiy Osovich; Oleg Kramarenko; Vladyslav Dologodin	38.53	Italy; Giovanni Puggioni; Ezio Madonia; Angelo Cipolloni; Sandro Floris	38.66	Great Britain; Kevin Williams; Darren Braithwaite; Jason John; Darren Campbell	38.67
4 × 400 m	Great Britain; Mark Richardson; Jamie Baulch; Mark Hylton; Du'aine Ladejo	3:03.38	Germany; Uwe Jahn; Karsten Just; Kai Karsten; Rico Lieder	3:03.53	France; Pierre-Marie Hilaire; Marc Foucan; Willy Migerel; Jean-Louis Rapnouil	3:05.05
High jump	Arturo Ortiz; Spain	2.27	Leonid Pumalainen; Russia	2.27	Dalton Grant; Great Britain	2.27
Pole vault	Pyotr Bochkaryov; Russia	5.70	Tim Lobinger; Germany	5.60	José Manuel Arcos; Spain	5.50
Long jump	Simone Bianchi; Italy	8.25	Jesús Oliván; Spain	7.97	Bakri Darouèche; France	7.96
Triple jump	Jonathan Edwards; Great Britain	17.79w	Vladimir Kravchenko; Ukraine	17.29w	Gennadiy Markov; Russia	17.12w
Shot put	Paolo Dal Soglio; Italy	20.72	Oliver-Sven Buder; Germany	20.08	Yuriy Bilonog; Ukraine	19.86
Discus throw	David Martínez; Spain	62.38	Sergey Lyakhov; Russia	62.20	Jürgen Schult; Germany	61.96
Hammer throw	Karsten Kobs; Germany	78.18	Marko Wahlman; Finland	77.72	Enrico Sgrulletti; Italy	77.44
Javelin throw	Raymond Hecht; Germany	88.86	Sergey Makarov; Russia	84.96	Harri Hakkarainen; Finland	81.44
WR world record | AR area record | CR championship record | GR games record | NR national record | OR Olympic record | PB personal best | SB season best | WL world leading (in a given season)

==== Women's events ====
Event	Gold		Silver		Bronze	
100 m (Wind: +0.3 m/s)	Marina Trandenkova; Russia	11.14	Melanie Paschke; Germany	11.19	Irina Pukha; Ukraine	11.25
200 m (Wind: +1.6 m/s)	Marie-José Pérec; France	22.34	Melanie Paschke; Germany	22.55	Katharine Merry; Great Britain	22.88
400 m	Grit Breuer; Germany	50.22	Anna Kozak; Belarus	50.94	Sandra Myers; Spain	51.10
800 m	Svetlana Masterkova; Russia	1:57.87	Kelly Holmes; Great Britain	1:58.20	Natalya Dukhnova; Belarus	1:59.70
1500 m	Olga Churbanova; Russia	4:09.57	Sylvia Kühnemund; Germany	4:10.22	Frédérique Quentin; France	4:10.49
3000 m	Blandine Bitzner-Ducret; France	8:59.82	Petra Wassiluk; Germany	9:02.91	Marta Domínguez; Spain	9:06.27
5000 m	Kathrin Wessel; Germany	15:40.36	Julia Vaquero; Spain	15:41.99	Farida Fatès; France	15:47.72
100 m hurdles (Wind: +2.7 m/s)	Nadezhda Bodrova; Ukraine	12.89w	Lidiya Yurkova; Belarus	12.99w	Angie Thorp; Great Britain	13.09w
400 m hurdles	Sally Gunnell; Great Britain	56.84	Silvia Rieger; Germany	57.07	Nelli Voronkova; Belarus	57.39
4 × 100 m	Russia; Natalya Merzlyakova; Galina Malchugina; Marina Trandenkova; Oksana Dyachenko	42.55	Germany; Andrea Philipp; Melanie Paschke; Silke-Beate Knoll; Silke Lichtenhagen	42.59	France; Sandra Citté; Odiah Sidibé; Delphine Combe; Marie-José Pérec	43.13
4 × 400 m	Germany; Uta Rohländer; Silke-Beate Knoll; Linda Kisabaka; Grit Breuer	3:26.19	Ukraine; Viktoriya Fomenko; Lyudmila Koshchey; Olga Moroz; Olena Rurak	3:27.74	Russia; Tatyana Chebykina; Natalya Sharova; Yuliya Sotnikova; Olga Kotlyarova	3:28.54
High jump	Alina Astafei; Germany	1.98	Stefka Kostadinova; Bulgaria	1.94	Yelena Topchina; Russia	1.90
Long jump	Iva Prandzheva; Bulgaria	6.84	Yelena Sinchukova; Germany	6.81	Claudia Gerhardt; Russia	6.76
Triple jump	Ashia Hansen; Great Britain	14.57; CR	Yelena Govorova; Ukraine	14.42	Lyudmila Dubkova; Russia	14.14
Shot put	Astrid Kumbernuss; Germany	20.05	Judy Oakes; Great Britain	19.00	Svetlana Krivelyova; Russia	17.70
Discus throw	Ilke Wyludda; Germany	65.66	Olga Chernyavskaya; Russia	65.06	Irina Yatchenko; Belarus	60.68
Javelin throw	Oksana Ovchinnikova; Russia	65.72	Natalya Shikolenko; Belarus	62.52	Tanja Damaske; Germany	58.80
WR world record | AR area record | CR championship record | GR games record | NR national record | OR Olympic record | PB personal best | SB season best | WL world leading (in a given season)

== First League ==
The First League was held on 28 and 29 June

=== Men ===
Group 1
Held in Lisbon, Portugal

Pos.	Nation	Points
1	Greece	111
2	Czech Republic	98.5
3	Portugal	88
4	Hungary	80
5	Ireland	78
6	Slovenia	72
7	Turkey	32.5

Group 2
Held in Bergen, Norway

Pos.	Nation	Points
1	Norway	112
2	Poland	107
3	Switzerland	97
4	Romania	91
5	Latvia	90
6	Austria	76
7	Belarus	72
8	Denmark	71

=== Women ===
Group 1
Held in Lisbon, Portugal

Pos.	Nation	Points
1	Italy	110
2	Czech Republic	98
3	Portugal	94
4	Hungary	79
5	Slovenia	73
6	Greece	68
7	Netherlands	64
8	Croatia	26

Group 2
Held in Bergen, Norway

Pos.	Nation	Points
1	Romania	101
2	Switzerland	92
3	Poland	89
4	Finland	88
5	Sweden	77
6	Norway	69
7	Denmark	56
8	Iceland	40

== Second League ==
The Second League was held on 29 and 30 June

=== Men ===
Group 1
Held in Oordegem, Belgium

Pos.	Nation	Points
1	Belgium	93.5
2	Netherlands	92.5
3	Cyprus	91
4	Israel	64
5	Iceland	52
6	AASSE	37

Group 2
Held in Tallinn, Estonia

Pos.	Nation	Points
1	Yugoslavia	96
2	Bulgaria	92
3	Slovenia	88
4	Croatia	87
5	Estonia	83
6	Lithuania	60
7	Moldova	55

=== Women ===
Group 1
Held in Oordegem, Belgium

Pos.	Nation	Points
1	Austria	103
2	Belgium	91
3	Ireland	77
4	Cyprus	62
5	Albania	51
6	Israel	50
7	AASSE	42

Group 2
Held in Tallinn, Estonia

Pos.	Nation	Points
1	Lithuania	90
2	Yugoslavia	84
3	Latvia	80
4	Estonia	73
5	Turkey	64
6	Slovenia	54
7	Moldova	30
