= 1988 World Junior Championships in Athletics – Men's 4 × 400 metres relay =

The men's 4x400 metres relay event at the 1988 World Junior Championships in Athletics was held in Sudbury, Ontario, Canada, at Laurentian University Stadium on 31 July.

== Medalists ==
Gold	Jesse Carr; Chris Nelloms; Jerome Williams; Ralph Carrington; United States
Silver	Anthony Ryan; Mark Garner; Dean Capobianco; Steve Perry; Australia
Bronze	Michael Rose; Carey Johnson; Anthony Pryce; Daniel England; Jamaica

== Results ==
=== Final ===
31 July

Rank	Nation	Competitors	Time	Notes
1st place, gold medalist(s)	United States	Jesse Carr; Chris Nelloms; Jerome Williams; Ralph Carrington	3:05.09	
2nd place, silver medalist(s)	Australia	Anthony Ryan; Mark Garner; Dean Capobianco; Steve Perry	3:07.60	
3rd place, bronze medalist(s)	Jamaica	Michael Rose; Carey Johnson; Anthony Pryce; Daniel England	3:08.00	
4	Cuba	Luis Cadogan; Enrique Díaz; Ángel Carnesolta; Pedro Cañete	3:08.48	
5	France	Olivier Noirot; Christian Landre; Gauthier Blanquart; Thierry Jean-Charles	3:10.12	
6	Japan	Shigeaki Matsunaga; Tatsuo Sugimoto; Shigeru Yamaguchi; Yoshikazu Tachi	3:10.50	
7	Canada	Brian Dicker; Karl Jones; Jonathon Fidelak; Mark Jackson	3:12.04	
8	Nigeria	Omokhegbele Okotako; Oritse Smith; Omokaro Alohan; Anthony Eziuka	3:12.48	

=== Heats ===
31 July

==== Heat 1 ====
Rank	Nation	Competitors	Time	Notes
1	Cuba	Luis Cadogan; Enrique Díaz; Ángel Carnesolta; Pedro Cañete	3:08.02	Q
2	France	Olivier Noirot; Christian Landre; Gauthier Blanquart; Thierry Jean-Charles	3:08.15	Q
3	Australia	Darren Edmunds; Anthony Ryan; Dean Capobianco; Mark Garner	3:08.41	q
	West Germany	Jochen Neumann; Erubami Ladipoh; Christian Kerberg; Marc Eggers	DQ	
	Poland	Jacek Oraczewski; Paweł Woźniak; Grzegorz Machelski; Tomasz Jędrusik	DQ	
	United Kingdom	Bob Brown; Kevin McKay; Mark Richardson; Wayne McDonald	DNF	
	Italy	Raffaele Altissimo; Paolo Bellino; Gianrico Boncompagni; Fabrizio Mori	DNF	

==== Heat 2 ====
Rank	Nation	Competitors	Time	Notes
1	United States	Jesse Carr; Chris Nelloms; Jerome Williams; Ralph Carrington	3:06.12	Q
2	Jamaica	Michael Rose; Carey Johnson; Anthony Pryce; Daniel England	3:08.03	Q
3	Nigeria	Omokhegbele Okotako; Oritse Smith; Omokaro Alohan; Anthony Eziuka	3:08.24	q
4	Japan	Shigeaki Matsunaga; Masaru Komori; Shigeru Yamaguchi; Yoshikazu Tachi	3:08.57	q
5	Canada	Brian Dicker; Karl Jones; Jonathon Fidelak; Mark Jackson	3:10.13	q
6	Spain	Miguel Cuesta; Salvador Vila; Amador Mohedano; Didac Mañas	3:11.23	
7	Kenya	Wilson Kipketer; Joseph Tengelei; Jonah Birir; Wilfred Kirochi	3:11.71	
8	Ethiopia	Legesse Dereba; Feru Dadi; Ojulu Bach; Tesfaye Aschalew	3:12.63	

== Participation ==
According to an unofficial count, 62 athletes from 15 countries participated in the event.

- Australia (5)
- Canada (4)
- Cuba (4)
- Ethiopia (4)
- France (4)
- Italy (4)
- Jamaica (4)
- Japan (5)
- Kenya (4)
- Nigeria (4)
- Poland (4)
- Spain (4)
- United Kingdom (4)
- United States (4)
- West Germany (4)
