= 1993 IAAF World Indoor Championships – Men's 200 metres =

The men's 200 metres event at the 1993 IAAF World Indoor Championships was held on 13 and 14 March.

== Medalists ==
Gold	Silver	Bronze
James Trapp; United States	Damien Marsh; Australia	Kevin Little; United States

== Results ==
=== Heats ===
First 2 of each heat (Q) and next 2 fastest (q) qualified for the semifinals.

Rank	Heat	Name	Nationality	Time	Notes
1	2	James Trapp	United States	20.67	Q
2	3	Kevin Little	United States	20.93	Q
3	2	Patrick Stevens	Belgium	20.95	Q
4	1	Damien Marsh	Australia	20.96	Q, AR
5	5	Nikolay Antonov	Bulgaria	20.99	Q
6	4	Frankie Fredericks	Namibia	21.04	Q
7	4	Iván García	Cuba	21.05	Q
8	5	Kevin Widmer	Switzerland	21.09	Q, NR
9	5	Andrey Fedoriv	Russia	21.13	q
10	1	Solomon Wariso	Great Britain	21.14	Q
11	2	Peter Ogilvie	Canada	21.15	q, PB
12	3	Christoph Pöstinger	Austria	21.18	Q
13	4	Marco Menchini	Italy	21.22	
14	2	Jason John	Great Britain	21.25	
15	5	Sidnei de Souza	Brazil	21.30	
16	2	Daniel Cojocaru	Romania	21.39	
17	3	Neil de Silva	Trinidad and Tobago	21.43	
18	1	Jiří Valík	Czech Republic	21.47	
19	3	Ricardo Greenidge	Canada	21.60	
20	4	André da Silva	Brazil	21.66	
21	1	Ray Stewart	Jamaica	21.77	
22	3	John Mair	Jamaica	21.86	
	1	Emmanuel Tuffour	Ghana	DQ	
	3	Vjacheslavs Kocherjagins	Latvia	DQ	
	4	John Rosery	Saint Lucia	DQ	
	5	Afonso Ferraz	Angola	DQ	
	5	Eswort Coombs	Saint Vincent and the Grenadines	DNS	

=== Semifinals ===
First 2 of each semifinal (Q) and the next 2 fastest (q) qualified for the final.

Rank	Heat	Name	Nationality	Time	Notes
1	1	James Trapp	United States	20.60	Q, PB
2	2	Kevin Little	United States	20.73	Q
3	2	Iván García	Cuba	20.78	Q, NR
4	2	Damien Marsh	Australia	20.79	q, AR
5	2	Patrick Stevens	Belgium	20.98	q
6	1	Nikolay Antonov	Bulgaria	21.07	Q
7	2	Christoph Pöstinger	Austria	21.09	
8	1	Peter Ogilvie	Canada	21.18	
9	2	Andrey Fedoriv	Russia	21.19	
10	1	Kevin Widmer	Switzerland	21.31	
11	1	Solomon Wariso	Great Britain	21.31	
	1	Frankie Fredericks	Namibia	DNS	

=== Final ===
Rank	Name	Nationality	Time	Notes
1st place, gold medalist(s)	James Trapp	United States	20.63	
2nd place, silver medalist(s)	Damien Marsh	Australia	20.71	AR
3rd place, bronze medalist(s)	Kevin Little	United States	20.72	
4	Iván García	Cuba	20.82	
5	Nikolay Antonov	Bulgaria	21.20	
6	Patrick Stevens	Belgium	21.21	
