= Anthony Ryan (philanthropist) =

Australian philanthropist (born 1969)

- Born: 5 March 1969 (age 57); Brisbane, Queensland, Australia
- Education: University of Queensland
- Occupation: CEO of Brisbane Economic Development Agency
- Known for: philanthropy
- Awards: Queensland Great (2009)

Medal record

Men's athletics

Representing Australia

World Athletics U20 Championships
Silver medal – second place	1988 Sudbury	Men's 4x400m relay

Anthony Ryan (born 5 March 1969) is an Australian philanthropist and former athlete.

Ryan is arguably best known for his charity work having had various positions with organisations such as the Mimiko Foundation, the Edmund Rice Foundation and Youngcare.

While a teacher at Brisbane's Nudgee College in 1999, he helped launch a mobile food van to serve the needs of the local homeless community. As CEO of the Edmund Rice Foundation, Ryan launched the 'Gone Fishing' initiative in 2013.

A successful athletic runner in his youth, Ryan was a silver medallist at the 1988 World Junior Championships in Athletics in Canada.

== Life and career ==
Ryan was born in Brisbane where he grew up. He attended St Anthony's Primary School and Padua College in Kedron before completing his secondary education at Nudgee College.

In his youth, Ryan was an accomplished athlete and competed at various national and international track and field events. At the 1988 World Junior Championships in Athletics in Canada, Ryan became a silver medallist as a member of the Australian Men's 4 × 400 m relay team along with his teammates Mark Garner, Dean Capobianco and Steve Perry. Although he displayed potential to further his athletics career, he was plagued with ongoing issues with a hamstring injury which prevented him from achieving further success.

He attended the University of Queensland studying a Bachelor of Arts/Bachelor of Economics degree, graduating in 1994. He was originally intending to be trained as a stockbroker under the guidance of Paul Morgan.

However, Ryan was inspired to change his mind and become a teacher instead, following a trip to Washington D.C. where he had worked with homeless people. As a result, he worked as a teacher from 1995 to 2008, which included working as an economics teacher at Nudgee College.

After being confronted by comments from a Nudgee College student who expressed some stereotypical misconceptions surrounding homeless people, Ryan instigated a program where students would volunteer to serve food to the homeless while also conversing them to challenge those stereotypes. As a result, Ryan co-founded Eddie's Van with colleague Damien Price. When Ryan became assistant principal at St Patrick's College at Shorncliff, he helped launched a similar van called Paddy's Van.

In 2005, Ryan became a founding director of Mimiki Foundation, which provides aid and support to marginalised youth in Queensland as well as in South Africa.

From 2010 to 2016, Ryan was involved with the Edmund Rice Foundation where he was chief executive officer from 2012 to 2016 where he is credited with helping the organisation achieve financial growth. While at the Edmund Rice Foundation, Ryan organised the inaugural 'Gone Fishing' initiative in which ten Australian corporate professionals travelled to Kenya to understand the issues affecting people in Africa with a figurative invitation to "teach other to fish".

From 2016 until his resignation in 2021, he was the chief executive officer of Youngcare.

In September 2021, it was announced Ryan would be appointed as the chief executive officer of Brisbane City Council's Economic Development Agency. According to Brisbane's lord mayor Adrian Schrinner, Ryan was chosen from a field of approximately 100 candidates for the role which will see him attempt to ensure the 2032 Summer Olympics are used to the advantage of the city's economy.

== Awards ==
In 2009, Ryan was named as a Queensland Great.

Ryan was named as the official ambassador of Queensland's Catholic Education Week celebrations in 2013.
