= David Dollé =

American-born Swiss sprinter

David Michael Dollé (born 30 May 1969) is a Swiss retired athlete who specialised in the sprinting events. He represented his country at the 1993 and 1995 World Championships reaching the semifinals on the first occasion.

== Competition record ==
Year	Competition	Venue	Position	Event	Notes
Representing Switzerland
1988	World Junior Championships	Sudbury, Canada	19th (qf)	100 m	10.98
1992	European Indoor Championships	Genoa, Italy	14th (sf)	60 m	6.76
1993	World Championships	Stuttgart, Germany	12th (sf)	200 m	20.70
1993	World Championships	Stuttgart, Germany	14th (h)	4 × 100 m relay	39.46
1994	European Indoor Championships	Paris, France	12th (h)	60 m	6.72
1994	European Championships	Helsinki, Finland	14th (sf)	100 m	10.59
1994	European Championships	Helsinki, Finland	8th	200 m	21.10
1995	World Championships	Gothenburg, Sweden	24th (qf)	200 m	20.84
1998	European Championships	Budapest, Hungary	11th (sf)	100 m	10.39

== Personal bests ==
Outdoor

- 100 metres – 10.16 (+1.3 m/s) (La Chaux-de-Fonds 1995)
- 200 metres – 20.43 (0.0 m/s) (Meilen 1993)

Indoor

- 60 metres – 6.69 (Magglingen 1994)
