= Lâm Hải Vân =

Vietnamese sprinter

Lâm Hải Vân (born 29 January 1975) is a former Vietnamese sprinter who competed in the men's 100m competition at the 1996 Summer Olympics.

Lâm competed representing the Ho Chi Minh City athletics club, and he was considered a 'big name' and 'famous' part of that club along with Nguyễn Đình Minh and Luong Tich Thien in the 1990s, when it was competitive on the Vietnamese national scene.

Lâm first qualified in two events for the 1993 World Championships in Athletics, competing in the men's 100 metres and 200 metres. He finished 7th in his 100 m heat in 11.28 seconds, and 8th in his 200 m heat, failing to advance in both events. Lâm also set his personal best 100 m time of 11.04 seconds that year.

At the 1996 Olympic Games in Atlanta, Lâm qualified to represent Vietnam in the 100 metres. Seeded in the 10th heat, Lâm ran 11.14 seconds to place 9th.
