= Domenico Nettis =

Italian sprinter

Personal information
- National team: Italy
- Born: 6 January 1972 (age 54) Acquaviva delle fonti, Italy

Sport
- Sport: Athletics
- Event: Sprint

Achievements and titles
- Personal best: 100 m: 10.32 (1994)
Medal record
Men's athletics
Representing Italy
European Championships
Bronze medal – third place	1994 Helsinki	4×100 m

Domenico Nettis (born 6 January 1972) is a retired Italian sprinter who specialized in the 100 metres.

== Biography ==
He won a bronze medal in 4 x 100 metres relay at the 1994 European Championships, together with teammates Ezio Madonia, Domenico Nettis, Giorgio Marras and Sandro Floris.

His personal best 100 metres time is 10.32 seconds, achieved in August 1994 in Rieti. His personal best 200 metres time is 21.06 seconds, achieved in May 1995 in Rieti.

== Achievements ==
Year	Competition	Venue	Position	Event	Notes
Representing Italy
1994	European Championships	Helsinki, Finland	34th (h)	100m	10.63 (wind: -0.4 m/s)
1994	European Championships	Helsinki, Finland	3rd	4 × 100 m relay	38.99

== See also ==
- Italy national relay team
