= Georgios Panagiotopoulos (athlete) =

Greek sprinter (born 1969)

Personal information
- Born: 12 August 1969 (age 57) Nafpaktos, Greece
Medal record
Men's athletics
Representing Greece
European Indoor Championships
Bronze medal – third place	1994 Paris	200 m
Mediterranean Games
Silver medal – second place	1993 Languedoc	4x100m relay
Silver medal – second place	1997 Bari	200m

Georgios Panagiotopoulos (Greek: Γεώργιος Παναγιωτόπουλος; born 12 August 1969) is a retired Greek sprinter who specialized in the 200 metres.

He won the bronze medal at the 1994 European Indoor Championships, finished seventh at the 1994 European Championships, won the silver medal at the 1997 Mediterranean Games, and finished fifth at the 1997 World Championships.

His personal best time was 20.32 seconds, achieved at the World Championships in Athens. This ranks him fifth among Greek 200 metres sprinters, behind Konstantinos Kenteris, Anastassios Gousis, Thomas Sbokos and Lykourgos-Stefanos Tsakonas. In the 100 metres, his personal best was 10.19 seconds, achieved in August 1998 in Patras. This ranks him eleventh among Greek 100 metres sprinters.

== Honours ==
Year	Competition	Venue	Position	Event	Notes
Representing Greece
1989	Universiade	Duisburg, West Germany	11th (sf)	200 m	21.22
1993	Mediterranean Games	Narbonne, France	5th	200 m	21.13
1993	Mediterranean Games	Narbonne, France	2nd	4 x 100 m relay	39.26
1993	World Championships	Stuttgart, Germany	10th (sf)	4 x 100 m relay	39.00
1994	European Indoor Championships	Paris, France	3rd	200 m	20.99
1994	European Championships	Helsinki, Finland	7th	200m	20.92 (wind: -0.1 m/s)
1994	European Championships	Helsinki, Finland	5th	4x100m relay	39.25
1996	Olympic Games	Atlanta, United States	30th (h)	200 m	20.86
1997	Mediterranean Games	Bari, Italy	2nd	200 m	20.53
1997	World Championships	Athens, Greece	5th	200 m	20.32 PB
1998	European Indoor Championships	Valencia, Spain	9th (sf)	200 m	21.11
1998	European Championships	Budapest, Hungary	4th	4 x 100 m relay	39.07
