= Kevin Widmer =

Swiss sprinter (born 1970)

Personal information
- Born: 23 September 1970 (age 55)
- Height: 1.80 m (5 ft 11 in)
- Weight: 70 kg (154 lb)

Sport
- Sport: Track and field
- Event: 200 metres
- Club: Stade Genève

Kevin Widmer (born 23 September 1970) is a retired Swiss athlete who competed in sprinting events. He represented his country at the 1996 Summer Olympics, as well as three outdoor and two indoor World Championships. Widmer is of Vietnamese descent and currently works as an athletics coach.

He still holds Swiss records in the outdoor and indoor 200 metres.

== Competition record ==
| Year | Competition | Venue | Position | Event | Notes |
Representing Switzerland
| 1992 | European Indoor Championships | Genoa, Italy | 20th (h) | 200 m | 21.81 |
| 1993 | World Indoor Championships | Toronto, Canada | 10th (sf) | 200 m | 21.31 |
| 1993 | World Championships | Stuttgart, Germany | – | 4 × 400 m relay | DQ |
| 1994 | European Indoor Championships | Paris, France | 18th (h) | 200 m | 21.32 |
| 1995 | World Championships | Gothenburg, Sweden | 21st (qf) | 200 m | 20.74 |
| 1995 | World Championships | Gothenburg, Sweden | 14th (h) | 4 × 400 m relay | 3:03.91 |
| 1996 | Olympic Games | Atlanta, United States | 13th (sf) | 4 × 400 m relay | 3:05.36 |
| 1997 | World Indoor Championships | Paris, France | 23rd (h) | 400 m | 47.81 |
| 1997 | World Championships | Athens, Greece | 14th (h) | 4 × 400 m relay | 3:05.34 |
| 1998 | European Indoor Championships | Valencia, Spain | 29th (h) | 60 m | 6.80 |
| 1998 | European Indoor Championships | Valencia, Spain | 13th (h) | 200 m | 21.56 |
| 1998 | European Championships | Budapest, Hungary | 29th (h) | 200 m | 21.37 |
| 1998 | European Championships | Budapest, Hungary | 5th | 4 × 400 m relay | 3:02.91 |

== Personal bests ==
Outdoor

- 100 metres – 10.24 (+1.3 m/s) (La Chaux-de-Fonds 1995)
- 200 metres – 20.41 (-0.2 m/s) (La Chaux-de-Fonds 1995) NR
- 400 metres – 45.84 (Lindau 1995)

Indoor

- 60 metres – 6.65 (Magglingen 1998)
- 200 metres – 20.99 (Magglingen 1998) NR
- 400 metres – 46.72 (Magglingen 2006)
