= Pedro Pablo Nolet =

Spanish athlete

Personal information
- Full name: Pedro Pablo Nolet Canto
- Born: 1 June 1970 (age 56) Oviedo, Spain
- Height: 1.79 m (5 ft 10 in)
- Weight: 78 kg (172 lb)

Sport
- Sport: Athletics
- Event(s): 100 m, 200 m
- Club: At. Gijones Fumeru

Pedro Pablo Nolet Canto (born 1 June 1970) is a retired Spanish athlete who competed in sprinting events. Her represented his country at three World Championships.

== International competitions ==
Year	Competition	Venue	Position	Event	Notes
Representing Spain
1993	Mediterranean Games	Narbonne, France	5th (h)	200 m	22.19
1993	Mediterranean Games	Narbonne, France	3rd	4 × 100 m relay	39.90
1993	World Championships	Gothenburg, Sweden	32nd (h)	200 m	21.09
1993	World Championships	Gothenburg, Sweden	12th (sf)	4 × 100 m relay	39.17
1994	European Championships	Helsinki, Finland	21st (h)	100 m	10.54
1994	European Championships	Helsinki, Finland	10th (h)	4 × 100 m relay	40.01
1995	World Championships	Gothenburg, Sweden	13th (sf)	4 × 100 m relay	39.16
1999	World Championships	Seville, Spain	56th (h)	100 m	10.70
2001	Mediterranean Games	Radès, Tunisia	7th	200 m	21.28
2001	Mediterranean Games	Radès, Tunisia	3rd	4 × 100 m relay	40.00
2002	World Cup	Madrid, Spain	8th	4 × 100 m relay	39.64

== Personal bests ==
Outdoor

- 100 metres – 10.35 (+1.8 m/s, Getafe 1993)
- 200 metres – 20.91 (+1.0 m/s, Salamanca 1993)

Indoor

- 60 metres – 6.71 (Madrid 1999)
- 200 metres – 21.51 (Valencia 1997)
