= Vladyslav Dolohodin =

Ukrainian sprinter (born 1972)

Personal information
- Born: 23 February 1972 (age 54)
Medal record
Men's athletics
Representing Ukraine
European Championships
Silver medal – second place	1994 Helsinki	200 m
Silver medal – second place	1994 Helsinki	4×100 m
European Indoor Championships
Silver medal – second place	1994 Paris	200 m
European Cup
Gold medal – first place	1996 Madrid	4x100 m
Silver medal – second place	1995 Villeneuve d'Ascq	200 m
Silver medal – second place	1996 Madrid	200 m
Bronze medal – third place	1996 Madrid	100 m

Vladyslav Dolohodin (Ukrainian: Владислав Дологодін; born 23 February 1972 in Yuzhno-Sakhalinsk) is a retired sprinter from Ukraine, who competed at the 1996 Summer Olympics for his native country. He set his personal best in the men's 100 metres (10.35) on 1994-07-06 in Lausanne.

In 1994 Dolohodin won silver medals in 200 m at the European Indoor Championships in Paris and the European Championships in Helsinki. At the European Championships he won another silver medal in 4 × 100 m relay. His personal best in the men's 200 m (20.36) was set on 1994-08-28 in Rieti.

The 1994 European Athletics Championships took place from 7 August to 14 August 1994 at the Olympic Stadium in Helsinki, Finland

At the 1996 Summer Olympics in Atlanta, Dolohodin helped Ukraine finish fourth in the men's 4 × 100 metres relay. He was also part of the Ukrainian relay teams that recorded national records of 38.53 seconds in the 4 × 100 metres in Madrid (1996) and 1:21.32 in the 4 × 200 metres in Portsmouth (1993).

In the individual 100 metres, he recorded a hand-timed 9.9 seconds in Kharkiv in 1994, although World Athletics marks the performance as not legal. In May 1996, he ran a reported 10.02 seconds in Kyiv, initially recognized as a Ukrainian national record. The result was later removed from official records because of concerns about the timing system.

Dinamo, Kharkiv

Achievement	Result	Year and location
4×100 m relay — national record	38.53 s	1996, Madrid
4×200 m relay — national record	1:21.32	1993, Portsmouth
100 m — hand-timed performance	9.9 s	1994, Kharkiv
100 m — formerly recognized national record	10.02 s	1996, Kyiv
