= Philip Goedluck =

British bobsledder and athlete

Personal information
- Nationality: British
- Born: 10 September 1967 (age 58) Lambeth, England

Sport
- Sport: Bobsleigh
Medal record
Athletics
Representing England
Commonwealth Games
Bronze medal – third place	1994 Victoria	4 x 100m relay

Philip Adrian Troy Goedluck (born 10 September 1967) is a male retired British bobsledder and athlete.

== Bobsleigh career ==
He competed in the four man event at the 2002 Winter Olympics.

== Athletics career ==
He represented England and won a bronze medal in the 4 x 100 metres relay event, at the 1994 Commonwealth Games in Victoria, British Columbia, Canada.
