= Torbjörn Eriksson =

Swedish sprinter

Personal information
- Born: 17 April 1971 (age 55) Grycksbo, Sweden
- Height: 1.70 m (5 ft 7 in)
- Weight: 68 kg (150 lb)

Sport
- Sport: Track and field
- Event: 200 metres
- Club: Falu IK; Sundsvalls IF
Medal record
Men's Athletics
Representing Sweden
European Indoor Championships
Bronze medal – third place	1996 Stockholm	200m

Jan Torbjörn Eriksson (born 17 April 1971) is a retired Swedish athlete who competed in the sprinting events. He is best known for winning the bronze medal in the 200 metres at the 1996 European Indoor Championships in his native Sweden. In addition, he competed at the 1992 and 1996 Summer Olympics, as well as four consecutive World Championships, starting in 1993.

In 2008, he started coaching Swedish hurdlers, sisters Jenny and Susanna Kallur.

== Competition record ==
Year	Competition	Venue	Position	Event	Notes
Representing Sweden
1988	World Junior Championships	Sudbury, Canada	20th (sf)	200 m	21.74 w (wind: +2.4 m/s)
1989	European Junior Championships	Varaždin, Yugoslavia	14th (sf)	100 m	10.89
1989	European Junior Championships	Varaždin, Yugoslavia	8th	200 m	21.92
1989	European Junior Championships	Varaždin, Yugoslavia	6th	4 × 100 m relay	41.30
1990	World Junior Championships	Plovdiv, Bulgaria	37th (h)	100 m	10.88 (wind: -0.2 m/s)
1990	World Junior Championships	Plovdiv, Bulgaria	12th (sf)	200 m	21.26 (wind: +0.6 m/s)
1992	European Indoor Championships	Genoa, Italy	16th (h)	200 m	21.40
1992	Olympic Games	Barcelona, Spain	14th (sf)	200 m	20.85
1993	World Championships	Stuttgart, Germany	26th (qf)	200 m	21.07
1993	World Championships	Stuttgart, Germany	8th	4 × 100 m relay	39.22
1994	European Championships	Helsinki, Finland	4th	4 × 100 m relay	39.05
1995	World Indoor Championships	Barcelona, Spain	5th (sf)	200 m	21.06
1995	World Championships	Gothenburg, Sweden	43rd (h)	200 m	21.03
1996	European Indoor Championships	Stockholm, Sweden	3rd	200 m	21.07
1996	Olympic Games	Atlanta, United States	53rd (h)	100 m	10.49
1996	Olympic Games	Atlanta, United States	28th (qf)	200 m	20.83
1997	World Championships	Athens, Greece	12th (sf)	4 × 100 m relay	39.04
1998	European Championships	Budapest, Hungary	7th (sf)	200 m	21.00
1998	European Championships	Budapest, Hungary	6th	4 × 100 m relay	39.32
1999	World Championships	Seville, Spain	22nd (qf)	200 m	20.74

== Personal bests ==
Outdoor

- 100 metres – 10.30 (Gävle 1996)
- 200 metres – 20.58 (-0.6 m/s) (Seville 1999)

Indoor

- 60 metres – 6.75 (Malmö 1998)
- 200 metres – 21.02 (Ghent 1996)
