= Robert Kurnicki =

Polish-German sprinter

Robert Kurnicki (born 27 March 1965 in Zabrze, Poland) is a retired Polish-German sprinter who specialized in the 200 metres.

At the 1993 World Championships he finished sixth in the 4 × 100 metres relay, together with teammates Marc Blume, Michael Huke and Steffen Görmer.

His personal best time is 20.46 seconds, achieved in July 1993 in Duisburg. He represented the sports club TV 01 Wattenscheid.
