= Evgenios Papadopoulos =

Greek sprinter

Evgenios Papadopoulos (Greek: Ευγένιος Παπαδόπουλος; born 2 July 1973) is a retired Greek sprinter who specialized in the 200 metres.

He finished fourth at the 1994 European Indoor Championships.

His personal best time in the 200 metres was 20,81 seconds, achieved in July 1994 in Trikala. In the 400 metres he had 46,39 seconds, achieved in June 1994 in Athens.
