= Ioannis Nafpliotis =

Greek sprinter (born 1970)

Ioannis Nafpliotis (born 15 January 1970) is a Greek sprinter who specialized in the 200 metres.

He finished sixth at the 1996 European Indoor Championships. He also competed at the World Championships in 1993 and 1997 without reaching the final.

His personal best time was 20.58 seconds, achieved in July 1995 in Patras. This ranks him eighth among Greek 200 metres sprinters, .
