= Steffen Görmer =

German sprinter (born 1968)

Steffen Görmer (born 28 July 1968) is a retired German sprinter who specialized in the 100 metres. He represented the sports club SV Halle.

He finished fifth at the 1989 IAAF World Cup and eighth at the 1990 European Championships. At the 1993 World Championships he finished sixth in the 4 × 100 metres relay, together with teammates Marc Blume, Robert Kurnicki and Michael Huke.

His personal best time was 10.28 seconds, achieved in June 1989 in Rostock.

He later turned to competing in bobsleigh, and participated at the 1998 Winter Olympics where he finished eighth in the four-man event with teammates Harald Czudaj, Torsten Voss (another former athlete) and Alexander Szelig.
