= Oleg Fatun =

Russian former track and field sprinter

Personal information
- Full name: Russian: Олег Николаевич Фатун
- Nationality: Soviet Union; Russia
- Born: 11 November 1959 (age 66) Rostov Oblast

Sport
- Sport: Track and field
- Event: Sprint

Achievements and titles
- Personal bests: 200m: 20.71 WC 1993; 4×100 m: 38.46 NR 1990; 4×200 m: 1:21.63 NR 1993; 4×200m i: 1:23.04 NR 1993
Medal record
Men's athletics
Representing Soviet Union
Goodwill Games
Bronze medal – third place	1990 Seattle	4×100 m relay
Summer Universiade
Bronze medal – third place	1987 Zagreb	4x100 m relay
Representing Russia
Goodwill Games
Bronze medal – third place	1994 St. Petersburg	4×100 m relay
- Updated on 31 August 2015

Oleg Nikolayevich Fatun (Russian: Олег Николаевич Фатун; born 11 November 1959) is a Russian former track and field sprinter. He won bronze medals in the 4×100 metres relay at the Goodwill Games in 1990 and 1994. He also represented Russia at the 1993 World Championships in Athletics and 1994 European Athletics Championships, as well as having represented the Soviet Union at the 1990 European Athletics Championships.

Along with his teammates, he set the Russian records in the 4×100 metres relay, 4×200 metres relay and indoor 4×200 metres relay which are still unbeaten (as of 2015).
