= Dean Capobianco =

Australian sprinter

Personal information
- Nationality: Australian
- Born: 11 May 1970 (age 56) Perth, Australia
- Height: 180 cm (5 ft 11 in) /
- Weight: 76 kg (168 lb)

Sport
- Sport: Athletics
- Event: Sprints
- Club: Curtin University

Dean Capobianco (born 11 May 1970) is an Australian former athlete, known best as a sprinter. He won the 1990 Stawell Gift and represented Australia in the 200 metres at the 1992 Barcelona and 1996 Atlanta Olympic Games.

== Biography ==
In 1993, he reached his peak in the World Athletics Championships in Stuttgart, Germany, when he set a new personal best of 20.18 seconds over 200 metres.

Capobianco won the 1990 Stawell Gift with a time of 12.29 and a handicap of 2.25 metres (2.46 yd).

He finished second behind John Regis in the 200 metres event at the British 1990 AAA Championships.

=== Controversy ===
An IAAF arbitration panel found Capobianco guilty of taking anabolic steroids, 10 months after he was cleared of any doping offence in a preliminary hearing by an IAAF independent arbitrator. IAAF general secretary Istvan Gyulai said that the reinstatement of Capobianco in July 1996 following a report for Athletics Australia by Robert Ellicott, QC, was a mistake. That inquiry cleared Capobianco on a technicality to run in the Olympic Games. In 1996, after months of legal challenge, Capobianco was banned from competition for four years by the IAAF for taking the banned steroid stanozolol after a meeting in Hengelo. Capobianco raced in Dijon the day prior to Hengelo and returned a negative (clear) drugs test. Capobianco's costs for arbitration were paid by the IAAF and his ban was later reduced to 2 years.

== Results ==
=== World Athletics Championships ===
Venue	Event	Place	Time
1999 World Championships in Athletics, Seville, Spain	200 m - Men	Heats	21.48
1995 World Championships in Athletics, Gothenburg, Sweden	200 m - Men	5th	20.88
1993 World Championships in Athletics, Stuttgart, Germany	200 m - Men	4th	20.18

=== Olympics ===
Venue	Event	Place	Time
1992 Summer Olympics, Barcelona	200 m - Men	1st (Round 1, heat 8)	20.86
1992 Summer Olympics, Barcelona	200 m - Men	4th (Round 2, heat 3)	20.61
1996 Summer Olympics, Atlanta	200 m - Men	4th (Qualifying, heat 8)	20.76
1996 Summer Olympics, Atlanta	200 m - Men	7th (Quarter final, heat 2)	21.03
1996 Summer Olympics, Atlanta	4 × 100 m Relay - Men	1st (Qualifying, heat 5)	38.93
1996 Summer Olympics, Atlanta	4 × 100 m Relay - Men	disqualified (Semi-final, heat 2)	
1996 Summer Olympics, Atlanta	4 × 400 m Relay - Men	4th (Qualifying, heat 1)	3:03.73
1996 Summer Olympics, Atlanta	4 × 400 m Relay - Men	7th (Semi-final, heat 1)	3:04.55

== Post-athletics career ==
In 2021 Capobianco was appointed CEO of the location data provider Geoscape Australia.
