= Giorgio Marras =

Italian sprinter (born 1971)

Personal information
- National team: Italy
- Born: 15 October 1971 (age 54) Marrubiu, Italy
- Height: 1.78 m (5 ft 10 in)
- Weight: 65 kg (143 lb)

Sport
- Sport: Athletics
- Event: Sprint
- Club: G.S. Fiamme Oro

Achievements and titles
- Personal bests: 100 m: 10.32 (1993); 200 m: 20.48 (1994)
Medal record
Men's athletics
Representing Italy
European Championships
Bronze medal – third place	1994 Helsinki	4×100 m

Giorgio Marras (born 15 October 1971 in Marrubiu) is a retired Italian sprinter who specialized in the 200 metres.

== Biography ==
He won a bronze medal in 4 x 100 metres relay at the 1994 European Championships, together with teammates Ezio Madonia, Domenico Nettis and Sandro Floris. He also finished fourth in 200 metres at the 1992 European Indoor Championships.

His personal best 200 metres time is 20.48 seconds, achieved in July 1994 in Sestriere. His personal best 100 metres time is 10.32 seconds, achieved in July 1993 in Nuoro.

== Achievements ==
Year	Competition	Venue	Position	Event	Notes
Representing Italy
1990	World Junior Championships	Plovdiv, Bulgaria	30th (qf)	100m	11.01 (wind: -2.1 m/s)
1990	World Junior Championships	Plovdiv, Bulgaria	6th	4 × 100 m relay	39.92
1991	European Cup	Frankfurt, Germany	3rd	4 × 100 m relay	38.89
1994	European Championships	Helsinki, Finland	10th (sf)	200m	20.95 (wind: +0.5 m/s)
1994	European Championships	Helsinki, Finland	3rd	4 × 100 m relay	38.99

== National titles ==
He has won 4 times the individual national championship.

- 3 wins in the 200 metres (1992, 1993, 1994)
- 1 win in the 200 metres indoor (1994)

== See also ==
- Italian all-time lists - 200 metres
- Italy national relay team
