= Geir Moen =

Norwegian sprinter (born 1969)

Personal information
- Born: 26 June 1969 (age 57) Oslo, Norway
Medal record
Men's athletics
Representing Norway
European Championships
Gold medal – first place	1994 Helsinki	200 m
Silver medal – second place	1994 Helsinki	100 m
World Indoor Championships
Gold medal – first place	1995 Barcelona	200 m
World Cup
Bronze medal – third place	1994 London	200 m
European Cup
Silver medal – second place	1997 Munich	100 m
Silver medal – second place	1997 Munich	4×100 m
Bronze medal – third place	1997 Munich	200 m

Geir Moen (born 26 June 1969 in Oslo) is a former sprinter from Moss, Norway who specialized in the 200 metres. He represented Moss IL.

His international senior debut came at the 1989 European Indoor Championships. At the 1994 European Championships he made his breakthrough as he won the gold medal in the 200 metres and the silver medal in the 100 metres. These were Norway's first European sprint medals since Haakon W. Tranberg in 1946. The same year he finished third in 200 m at the 1994 IAAF World Cup. The next year he won the 200 m at the 1995 World Indoor Championships and finished sixth at the 1995 World Championships. He reached an international final for the last time as he finished fourth at the 1998 European Championships. His last international championship was the 2002 European Championships, where he reached the semi-final. He also competed at the 1996 and 2000 Summer Olympics without reaching the final.

He became Norwegian champion in 100 metres in the years 1989, 1993–1999 and 2002 and in the 200 metres in the years 1988, 1991, 1993, 1995–1999 and 2002.

== Personal bests ==
- 100 metres - 10.08 s (1996)
- 200 metres - 20.17 s (1996)
- 4 × 100 metres relay - 38.96 s (1997) - Norwegian record.
