= Michael Huke =

German sprinter

Michael Huke (born March 30, 1969, in Sondershausen) is a retired German sprinter who specialized in the 100 and 200 metres. He represented the sports club TV 01 Wattenscheid.

At the 1993 World Championships he finished sixth in the 4 × 100 metres relay, together with teammates Marc Blume, Robert Kurnicki and Steffen Görmer.

His personal best times were 10.29 seconds in the 100 metres, achieved in June 1996 in Köln, and 20.60 seconds in the 200 metres, achieved in July 1994 in Erfurt.
