= Andrey Fedoriv =

Soviet sprinter (born 1963)

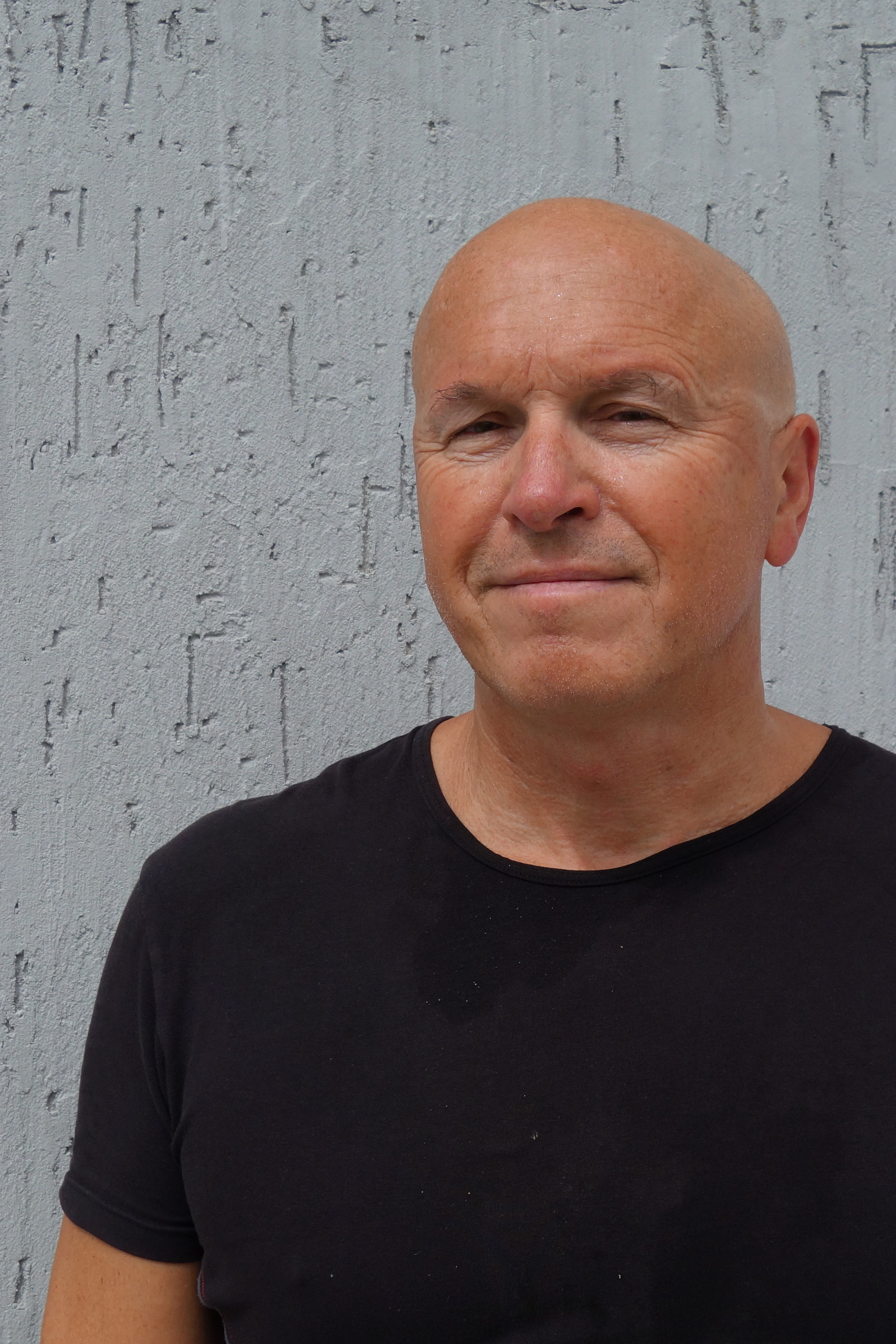
- Fedoriv in 2022

Personal information
- Born: August 11, 1963 (age 63) Lviv, Soviet Union

Sport
- Sport: Track and field
Medal record
Representing Soviet Union
World Championships
| Silver medal – second place | 1987 Rome | 4x100 m relay |
European Championships
| Bronze medal – third place | 1986 Stuttgart | 200 m |
Summer Universiade
| Silver medal – second place | 1989 Duisburg | 4x100 m relay |

Andrey Romanovich Fedoriv (Russian: Андрей Романович Федорив; born August 11, 1963) is a Soviet-born Russian former sprinter, who specialised in the 200 metres.

Born in Lviv, Soviet Ukraine, he was 4 times Soviet Indoor 200 metre champion. He also took 2nd place in the European Cup A in the 200m in 1993. He was also 3rd in the Euro Cup 200 in 87. In 1986 he won a bronze medal in the 200 metres at the European Championships in Stuttgart.

Fedoriv participated in the 1992 and the 1996 Summer Olympics. He is the father of Russian athlete Aleksandra Fedoriva.
