= Athletics at the 1995 Summer Universiade – Men's 4 × 100 metres relay =

The men's 4 × 100 metres relay event at the 1995 Summer Universiade was held on 2–3 September at the Hakatanomori Athletic Stadium in Fukuoka, Japan.

== Medalists ==
Gold	Silver	Bronze
United States; Terrence Bowen; David Oaks; Peter Hargraves; David Dopek; Brian Lewis*; Jeff Laynes*	Great Britain; Paul White; Toby Box; Douglas Walker; Michael Afilaka	Italy; Angelo Cipolloni; Alessandro Orlandi; Carlo Occhiena; Andrea Colombo

* Athletes who competed in heats only.

== Results ==
=== Heats ===
Qualification: First 3 teams of each heat (Q) plus the next 2 fastest (q) qualified for the final.

Rank	Heat	Nation	Athletes	Time	Notes
1	1	United States	Brian Lewis, Jeff Laynes, Peter Hargraves, David Dopek	39.01	Q
2	2	Japan	Hiroyasu Tsuchie, Tetsuya Yoshida, Masato Ebisawa, Takao Kawabe	39.36	Q
3	2	Great Britain	Paul White, Toby Box, Douglas Walker, Michael Afilaka	39.57	Q
4	1	Italy	Angelo Cipolloni, Alessandro Orlandi, Carlo Occhiena, Andrea Colombo	39.69	Q
5	2	Spain	Frutos Feo, Javier Navarro, Jordi Mayoral, Carlos Berlanga	39.80	Q
6	1	Chinese Taipei	Huang Hsin-Ping, Hu Wen-Yu, Tsai Yi-Chen, Tao Wu-Shiun	39.97	Q
7	2	Mexico	Carlos Villaseñor, Alejandro Cárdenas, Jaime López, Miguel Miranda	40.24	q
8	1	Ivory Coast	Benjamin Kouassi N'Dri, Hamed Douhou, Daouda Camara, Éric Pacôme N'Dri	40.98	q
9	1	Switzerland	Raphaël Monachon, Simon Schranz, Stéphane Diriwaechter, Gunnar Schrör	41.73	
10	2	Sri Lanka	Sampath Sujeeva, W. Wijetunga, Halahapperumage Fonseka, Suranga Perera	43.55	
	1	Libya		DNS	
	1	Chile		DNS	
	2	Macau		DNS	
	2	Botswana		DNS	

=== Final ===
Rank	Lane	Nation	Athletes	Time	Notes
1st place, gold medalist(s)	5	United States	Terrence Bowen, David Oaks, Peter Hargraves, David Dopek	38.96	
2nd place, silver medalist(s)	6	Great Britain	Paul White, Toby Box, Douglas Walker, Michael Afilaka	39.39	
3rd place, bronze medalist(s)	3	Italy	Angelo Cipolloni, Alessandro Orlandi, Carlo Occhiena, Andrea Colombo	39.64	
4	8	Spain	Carlos Berlanga, Javier Navarro, Frutos Feo, Jordi Mayoral	39.92	
5	7	Mexico	Carlos Villaseñor, Alejandro Cárdenas, Jaime López, Miguel Miranda	40.14	
6	4	Japan	Hiroyasu Tsuchie, Tetsuya Yoshida, Masato Ebisawa, Takao Kawabe	40.37	
7	1	Chinese Taipei	Huang Hsin-Ping, Hu Wen-Yu, Tsai Yi-Chen, Tao Wu-Shiun	40.39	
8	2	Ivory Coast	Benjamin Kouassi N'Dri, Hamed Douhou, Daouda Camara, Éric Pacôme N'Dri	41.18	
