= Athletics at the 1995 Summer Universiade – Men's 200 metres =

The men's 200 metres event at the 1995 Summer Universiade was held on 29–30 August at the Hakatanomori Athletic Stadium in Fukuoka, Japan.

== Medalists ==
| Gold | Silver | Bronze |
|---|---|---|
| Anthuan Maybank; United States | David Dopek; United States | Thomas Sbokos; Greece |

== Results ==
=== Heats ===
Qualification: First 3 of each heat (Q) and the next 7 fastest (q) qualified for the quarterfinals.

Wind:
Heat 1: -1.0 m/s, Heat 2: -0.5 m/s, Heat 3: -0.4 m/s, Heat 4: +0.6 m/s, Heat 5: -0.9 m/s, Heat 6: -0.7 m/s
Heat 7: +0.3 m/s, Heat 8: +0.2 m/s, Heat 9: -0.1 m/s, Heat 10: -0.7 m/s, Heat 11: -1.0 m/s

| Rank | Heat | Athlete | Nationality | Time | Notes |
|---|---|---|---|---|---|
| 1 | 4 | David Dopek | United States | 20.75 | Q |
| 2 | 3 | Owusu Dako | Great Britain | 20.95 | Q |
| 3 | 1 | Anthuan Maybank | United States | 20.99 | Q |
| 4 | 8 | Hamed Douhou | Ivory Coast | 21.04 | Q |
| 5 | 7 | Thomas Sbokos | Greece | 21.12 | Q |
| 6 | 6 | Justice Dipeba | Botswana | 21.19 | Q |
| 7 | 8 | Jun Osakada | Japan | 21.21 | Q |
| 8 | 5 | Daniel Cojocaru | Romania | 21.24 | Q |
| 9 | 8 | Douglas Walker | Great Britain | 21.28 | Q |
| 10 | 11 | Jordi Mayoral | Spain | 21.30 | Q |
| 11 | 2 | Takao Kawabe | Japan | 21.32 | Q |
| 12 | 3 | Peter Crane | Australia | 21.36 | Q |
| 13 | 1 | Ricardo Roach | Chile | 21.37 | Q |
| 13 | 11 | Stéphane Diriwaechter | Switzerland | 21.37 | Q |
| 15 | 1 | Clóvis Fernandes | Brazil | 21.42 | Q |
| 15 | 10 | Achebe Hope | Barbados | 21.42 | Q |
| 17 | 3 | Angelo Cipolloni | Italy | 21.46 | Q |
| 17 | 6 | Dmitriy Bey | Russia | 21.46 | Q |
| 19 | 6 | Ari Pakarinen | Finland | 21.48 | Q |
| 20 | 10 | Sebastián Keitel | Chile | 21.50 | Q |
| 21 | 4 | Sergey Voronin | Russia | 21.56 | Q |
| 22 | 9 | Javier Navarro | Spain | 21.66 | Q |
| 23 | 5 | Mark Ladbrook | Australia | 21.67 | Q |
| 23 | 9 | Aleksey Martynenko | Kazakhstan | 21.67 | Q |
| 25 | 4 | Sam Dawa | Uganda | 21.69 | Q |
| 26 | 2 | Éric Pacôme N'Dri | Ivory Coast | 21.70 | Q |
| 26 | 7 | Marián Vanderka | Slovakia | 21.70 | Q |
| 28 | 7 | Tao Wu-Shiun | Chinese Taipei | 21.73 | Q |
| 28 | 9 | Liod Kgopong | South Africa | 21.73 | Q |
| 30 | 9 | Gaëtan Bernard | Belgium | 21.76 | q |
| 31 | 1 | Rampa Mosweu | Botswana | 21.77 | q |
| 31 | 5 | Miklós Gyulai | Hungary | 21.77 | Q |
| 33 | 2 | Maung Kyaw Htoo Aung | Myanmar | 21.82 | Q |
| 34 | 3 | Hu Wen-Yu | Chinese Taipei | 21.86 | q |
| 35 | 8 | Vladislav Chernobay | Kyrgyzstan | 21.93 | q |
| 36 | 10 | O'Brian Gibbons | Canada | 21.96 | Q |
| 37 | 7 | Robert Bruce | New Zealand | 22.01 | q |
| 38 | 6 | John Mena | Colombia | 22.06 | q |
| 39 | 11 | Tomaž Božič | Slovenia | 22.08 | Q |
| 40 | 1 | Javier Verme | Peru | 22.10 | q |
| 41 | 5 | Bülent Eren | Turkey | 22.14 | |
| 42 | 2 | Edmund Estaphane | Saint Lucia | 22.16 | |
| 43 | 1 | Peter Lawson | Canada | 22.18 | |
| 44 | 7 | W. Wijetunga | Sri Lanka | 22.19 | |
| 45 | 11 | Ralph Blaauw | Namibia | 22.20 | |
| 46 | 9 | Sokol Shepeteja | Albania | 22.30 | |
| 47 | 4 | Jaime López | Mexico | 22.34 | |
| 48 | 10 | Mario Bonello | Malta | 22.35 | |
| 49 | 9 | Elsadig Fadul Eissa | Sudan | 22.37 | |
| 50 | 2 | Mehdi Sekkouh | Algeria | 22.39 | |
| 51 | 4 | Inos Mugabe | Zimbabwe | 22.43 | |
| 52 | 8 | Ysrael Jugueta | Philippines | 22.44 | |
| 53 | 2 | Francisco Naudé | South Africa | 22.47 | |
| 54 | 1 | Nigel Jones | Grenada | 22.58 | |
| 55 | 6 | Hassan Kiawu | Liberia | 22.61 | |
| 56 | 7 | Wong Wai Kuen | Hong Kong | 22.65 | |
| 57 | 6 | Carlos José Toledo | El Salvador | 22.73 | |
| 58 | 3 | Kahlil Cato | Saint Vincent and the Grenadines | 22.81 | |
| 59 | 2 | Au Chi Kun | Macau | 22.83 | |
| 60 | 4 | Emad Farg | Libya | 22.87 | |
| 61 | 10 | Touhidur Rahman | Bangladesh | 23.06 | |
| 62 | 10 | Osvaldo Soto | Costa Rica | 23.10 | |
| 63 | 3 | Choi Wai Kin | Hong Kong | 23.15 | |
| 64 | 5 | Hamilton Mhlanga | Swaziland | 23.16 | |
| 65 | 2 | Suranga Perera | Sri Lanka | 23.17 | |
| 66 | 7 | Rogerio José | Mozambique | 23.29 | |
| 67 | 9 | Ahmed Fail | Maldives | 23.31 | |
| 68 | 6 | Jassim Al-Yousuf | United Arab Emirates | 23.33 | |
| 69 | 4 | Pietro Faetanini | San Marino | 23.34 | |
| 70 | 1 | John Mugabi | Uganda | 23.38 | |
| 71 | 11 | Walter Bong | Vanuatu | 23.42 | |
| 72 | 8 | Touroune Abdallah | Comoros | 23.62 | |
| 73 | 3 | William Paasewe | Liberia | 24.19 | |
| 74 | 4 | Ahmed Hamdan | Sudan | 24.40 | |
| 75 | 5 | Soulignet Phomphachan | Laos | 24.45 | |
| 76 | 8 | Lei Kam Hong | Macau | 25.33 | |
| | 10 | Cherno Sowe | Gambia | DQ | |
| | 3 | Alain Sayegh | Lebanon | DNS | |
| | 5 | Carlo Occhiena | Italy | DNS | |
| | 5 | Amgalan Ayur | Mongolia | DNS | |
| | 6 | Deji Aliu | Nigeria | DNS | |
| | 8 | Sergejs Inšakovs | Latvia | DNS | |
| | 11 | Fine Fua | Tonga | DNS | |
| | 11 | Derry Pemberton | United States Virgin Islands | DNS | |
| | 11 | Mubazam Mansor | Malaysia | DNS | |

=== Quarterfinals ===
Qualification: First 3 of each heat (Q) and the next 1 fastest (q) qualified for the semifinals.

Wind:
Heat 1: -0.4 m/s, Heat 2: -1.1 m/s, Heat 3: +0.2 m/s, Heat 4: +0.3 m/s, Heat 5: +0.2 m/s

| Rank | Heat | Athlete | Nationality | Time | Notes |
|---|---|---|---|---|---|
| 1 | 5 | Anthuan Maybank | United States | 20.58 | Q |
| 2 | 2 | Owusu Dako | Great Britain | 20.79 | Q |
| 3 | 3 | Sebastián Keitel | Chile | 20.86 | Q |
| 4 | 3 | Thomas Sbokos | Greece | 20.94 | Q |
| 5 | 2 | Jordi Mayoral | Spain | 20.96 | Q |
| 6 | 4 | David Dopek | United States | 20.99 | Q |
| 7 | 1 | Daniel Cojocaru | Romania | 21.06 | Q |
| 8 | 4 | Javier Navarro | Spain | 21.11 | Q |
| 9 | 3 | Justice Dipeba | Botswana | 21.13 | Q |
| 10 | 3 | Angelo Cipolloni | Italy | 21.13 | q |
| 11 | 3 | Stéphane Diriwaechter | Switzerland | 21.16 | |
| 12 | 1 | Hamed Douhou | Ivory Coast | 21.20 | Q |
| 13 | 1 | Clóvis Fernandes | Brazil | 21.21 | Q |
| 13 | 1 | Dmitriy Bey | Russia | 21.21 | |
| 13 | 3 | Ari Pakarinen | Finland | 21.21 | |
| 16 | 2 | Jun Osakada | Japan | 21.23 | Q |
| 17 | 5 | Takao Kawabe | Japan | 21.25 | Q |
| 18 | 5 | Peter Crane | Australia | 21.27 | Q |
| 19 | 4 | Achebe Hope | Barbados | 21.33 | Q |
| 20 | 2 | Mark Ladbrook | Australia | 21.38 | |
| 20 | 5 | Douglas Walker | Great Britain | 21.38 | |
| 22 | 1 | Ricardo Roach | Chile | 21.55 | |
| 23 | 5 | Tao Wu-Shiun | Chinese Taipei | 21.57 | |
| 24 | 4 | Aleksey Martynenko | Kazakhstan | 21.58 | |
| 25 | 4 | Éric Pacôme N'Dri | Ivory Coast | 21.59 | |
| 26 | 2 | Liod Kgopong | South Africa | 21.61 | |
| 27 | 5 | Sergey Voronin | Russia | 21.74 | |
| 28 | 1 | Sam Dawa | Uganda | 21.86 | |
| 29 | 4 | Maung Kyaw Htoo Aung | Myanmar | 21.91 | |
| 30 | 3 | Hu Wen-Yu | Chinese Taipei | 21.92 | |
| 31 | 2 | John Mena | Colombia | 21.93 | |
| 32 | 4 | Javier Verme | Peru | 21.96 | |
| 33 | 4 | Rampa Mosweu | Botswana | 21.96 | |
| 34 | 5 | Robert Bruce | New Zealand | 22.05 | |
| 35 | 3 | Miklós Gyulai | Hungary | 22.06 | |
| 36 | 1 | Vladislav Chernobay | Kyrgyzstan | 22.09 | |
| 37 | 5 | Tomaž Božič | Slovenia | 22.13 | |
| 38 | 1 | Gaëtan Bernard | Belgium | 22.21 | |
| | 2 | O'Brian Gibbons | Canada | DNS | |
| | 2 | Marián Vanderka | Slovakia | DNS | |

=== Semifinals ===
Qualification: First 4 of each semifinal qualified directly (Q) for the final.

Wind:
Heat 1: +0.4 m/s, Heat 2: +1.5 m/s

| Rank | Heat | Athlete | Nationality | Time | Notes |
|---|---|---|---|---|---|
| 1 | 2 | David Dopek | United States | 20.69 | Q |
| 2 | 1 | Anthuan Maybank | United States | 20.74 | Q |
| 3 | 1 | Thomas Sbokos | Greece | 20.81 | Q |
| 4 | 2 | Jordi Mayoral | Spain | 20.88 | Q |
| 5 | 2 | Justice Dipeba | Botswana | 20.96 | Q |
| 6 | 2 | Sebastián Keitel | Chile | 21.03 | Q |
| 7 | 1 | Angelo Cipolloni | Italy | 21.12 | Q |
| 8 | 1 | Daniel Cojocaru | Romania | 21.22 | Q |
| 9 | 1 | Javier Navarro | Spain | 21.24 | |
| 10 | 2 | Peter Crane | Australia | 21.28 | |
| 11 | 2 | Takao Kawabe | Japan | 21.29 | |
| 12 | 2 | Owusu Dako | Great Britain | 21.32 | |
| 13 | 1 | Hamed Douhou | Ivory Coast | 21.34 | |
| 14 | 1 | Clóvis Fernandes | Brazil | 21.49 | |
| 15 | 1 | Jun Osakada | Japan | 21.50 | |
| 16 | 2 | Achebe Hope | Barbados | 21.53 | |

=== Final ===
Wind: +0.6 m/s

| Rank | Lane | Athlete | Nationality | Time | Notes |
|---|---|---|---|---|---|
| 1st place, gold medalist(s) | 6 | Anthuan Maybank | United States | 20.46 | |
| 2nd place, silver medalist(s) | 4 | David Dopek | United States | 20.47 | |
| 3rd place, bronze medalist(s) | 5 | Thomas Sbokos | Greece | 20.75 | |
| 4 | 3 | Jordi Mayoral | Spain | 20.88 | |
| 5 | 1 | Angelo Cipolloni | Italy | 20.95 | |
| 6 | 7 | Justice Dipeba | Botswana | 20.95 | |
| 7 | 8 | Daniel Cojocaru | Romania | 20.97 | |
| 8 | 2 | Sebastián Keitel | Chile | 21.14 | |
