= Athletics at the 1995 Summer Universiade – Men's 100 metres =

The men's 100 metres event at the 1995 Summer Universiade was held on 31 August – 1 September at the Hakatanomori Athletic Stadium in Fukuoka, Japan.

== Medalists ==
Gold	Silver	Bronze
David Oaks; United States	Obadele Thompson; Barbados	Terrence Bowen; United States

== Results ==
=== Heats ===
Qualification: First 3 of each heat (Q) and the next 7 fastest (q) qualified for the quarterfinals.

Wind:
Heat 1: -1.3 m/s, Heat 2: -1.0 m/s, Heat 3: -1.5 m/s, Heat 4: -0.3 m/s, Heat 5: -2.8 m/s, Heat 6: -2.8 m/s
Heat 7: -1.0 m/s, Heat 8: -1.4 m/s, Heat 9: -1.2 m/s, Heat 10: +0.5 m/s, Heat 11: +0.7 m/s

Rank	Heat	Athlete	Nationality	Time	Notes
1	7	David Oaks	United States	10.36	Q
2	2	Ibrahim Meité	Ivory Coast	10.39	Q
3	11	Obadele Thompson	Barbados	10.44	Q
4	10	Deji Aliu	Nigeria	10.45	Q
5	11	Masato Ebisawa	Japan	10.48	Q
6	8	Terrence Bowen	United States	10.51	Q
7	1	Frutos Feo	Spain	10.54	Q
7	10	Toby Box	Great Britain	10.54	Q
9	3	Paul White	Great Britain	10.56	Q
10	5	Carlos Bernardo Moreno	Chile	10.58	Q
11	4	Kostyantyn Rurak	Ukraine	10.59	Q
12	2	Alejandro Cárdenas	Mexico	10.66	Q
13	6	Daniel Cojocaru	Romania	10.67	Q
14	9	Vitaly Medvedev	Kazakhstan	10.68	Q
15	3	Ari Pakarinen	Finland	10.70	Q
15	10	Carlos Villaseñor	Mexico	10.70	Q
17	9	Georgios Theodoridis	Greece	10.73	Q
17	11	Sam Dawa	Uganda	10.73	Q
19	10	Tao Wu-Shiun	Chinese Taipei	10.74	q
20	5	Alessandro Orlandi	Italy	10.75	Q
21	6	Simon Schranz	Switzerland	10.76	Q
22	9	Atsuo Narita	Japan	10.79	Q
23	2	Carlos Berlanga	Spain	10.80	Q
24	8	Trevino Betty	Canada	10.81	Q
25	6	Huang Hsin-Ping	Chinese Taipei	10.83	Q
26	2	Edmund Estaphane	Saint Lucia	10.84	q
27	4	Peter Crane	Australia	10.85	Q
28	1	Anninos Marcoullides	Cyprus	10.87	Q
28	4	Haidara Togo	Mali	10.87	Q
28	7	John Mena	Colombia	10.87	Q
31	9	Stéphane Diriwaechter	Switzerland	10.88	q
32	1	François du Toit	South Africa	10.91	Q
33	7	Ruslan Rusidze	Georgia	10.92	Q
34	3	Gaëtan Bernard	Belgium	10.96	Q
35	3	Tomaž Božič	Slovenia	10.96	q
36	5	Aleksey Martynenko	Kazakhstan	10.99	Q
37	4	Ysrael Jugueta	Philippines	11.01	q
37	5	Maung Kyaw Htoo Aung	Myanmar	11.01	q
39	7	Vladislav Chernobay	Kyrgyzstan	11.03	
39	10	Benjamin Kouassi N'Dri	Ivory Coast	11.03	q
41	1	Robert Bruce	New Zealand	11.08	
42	1	Javier Verme	Peru	11.10	
42	5	Nigel Jones	Grenada	11.10	
44	10	Lebonetse Maifala	Botswana	11.12	
45	2	W. Wijetunga	Sri Lanka	11.14	
46	9	Ralph Blaauw	Namibia	11.17	
47	6	Inos Mugabe	Zimbabwe	11.18	
48	6	Mehdi Sekkouh	Algeria	11.20	
49	7	Touhidur Rahman	Bangladesh	11.24	
50	7	Wong Wai Kuen	Hong Kong	11.31	
51	9	Au Chi Kun	Macau	11.35	
52	9	Carlos José Toledo	El Salvador	11.38	
53	4	Hassan Kiawu	Liberia	11.39	
54	10	Emad Farg	Libya	11.43	
55	4	Afan Francisco Obama	Equatorial Guinea	11.45	
56	10	John Mugabi	Uganda	11.50	
57	6	Osvaldo Soto	Costa Rica	11.51	
58	2	Touroune Abdallah	Comoros	11.54	
58	5	Kahlil Cato	Saint Vincent and the Grenadines	11.54	
60	8	Suranga Perera	Sri Lanka	11.55	Q
61	2	Ahmed Fail	Maldives	11.56	
62	3	Rogerio José	Mozambique	11.63	
63	8	Walter Bong	Vanuatu	11.66	
64	3	Deodato Freitas	São Tomé and Príncipe	11.67	
65	5	Lý Ngọc Hải	Vietnam	11.74	
66	11	Mubazam Mansor	Malaysia	11.78	
67	6	Pietro Faetanini	San Marino	11.80	
68	7	Juan Pablo Faúndez	Chile	11.84	
68	8	Man Kin Seng	Macau	11.84	
70	11	Soulignet Phomphachan	Laos	11.92	
71	1	William Paasewe	Liberia	12.04	
	11	Elsadig Fadul Eissa	Sudan	DQ	
	1	Alain Sayegh	Lebanon	DNS	
	3	Vilmantas Pipiras	Lithuania	DNS	
	4	Guillermo Cárdenas	Ecuador	DNS	
	8	Andrea Colombo	Italy	DNS	
	8	Patrik Strenius	Sweden	DNS	
	9	Amgalan Ayur	Mongolia	DNS	
	11	Marián Vanderka	Slovakia	DNS	
	11	Francisco Naudé	South Africa	DNS	

=== Quarterfinals ===
Qualification: First 3 of each heat (Q) and the next 1 fastest (q) qualified for the semifinals.

Wind:
Heat 1: -1.1 m/s, Heat 2: +1.1 m/s, Heat 3: -0.5 m/s, Heat 4: -0.3 m/s, Heat 5: -0.4 m/s

Rank	Heat	Athlete	Nationality	Time	Notes
1	5	David Oaks	United States	10.27	Q
2	1	Ibrahim Meité	Ivory Coast	10.28	Q
3	2	Terrence Bowen	United States	10.38	Q
4	3	Obadele Thompson	Barbados	10.39	Q
5	4	Paul White	Great Britain	10.40	Q
6	4	Deji Aliu	Nigeria	10.40	Q
7	3	Toby Box	Great Britain	10.43	Q
8	5	Daniel Cojocaru	Romania	10.46	Q
9	3	Carlos Bernardo Moreno	Chile	10.48	Q
10	1	Kostyantyn Rurak	Ukraine	10.50	Q
11	2	Frutos Feo	Spain	10.52	Q
12	1	Masato Ebisawa	Japan	10.53	Q
12	4	Alejandro Cárdenas	Mexico	10.53	Q
12	5	Vitaly Medvedev	Kazakhstan	10.53	Q
15	2	Georgios Theodoridis	Greece	10.57	Q
16	4	Alessandro Orlandi	Italy	10.60	q
17	3	Simon Schranz	Switzerland	10.63	
18	5	Peter Crane	Australia	10.64	
19	2	Stéphane Diriwaechter	Switzerland	10.65	
20	2	Huang Hsin-Ping	Chinese Taipei	10.69	
20	3	Carlos Villaseñor	Mexico	10.69	
22	1	Trevino Betty	Canada	10.72	
23	2	Atsuo Narita	Japan	10.73	
24	4	Tao Wu-Shiun	Chinese Taipei	10.75	
25	4	Carlos Berlanga	Spain	10.78	
26	1	John Mena	Colombia	10.81	
27	2	Edmund Estaphane	Saint Lucia	10.82	
28	3	Haidara Togo	Mali	10.83	
28	4	Sam Dawa	Uganda	10.83	
30	5	Ruslan Rusidze	Georgia	10.86	
31	5	Anninos Marcoullides	Cyprus	10.86	
31	5	Gaëtan Bernard	Belgium	10.86	
33	1	Aleksey Martynenko	Kazakhstan	10.87	
34	4	Tomaž Božič	Slovenia	10.92	
35	1	François du Toit	South Africa	10.96	
36	1	Maung Kyaw Htoo Aung	Myanmar	11.05	
37	5	Benjamin Kouassi N'Dri	Ivory Coast	11.07	
38	2	Ari Pakarinen	Finland	11.19	
39	3	Suranga Perera	Sri Lanka	11.45	
	3	Ysrael Jugueta	Philippines	DNS	

=== Semifinals ===
Qualification: First 4 of each semifinal qualified directly (Q) for the final.

Wind:
Heat 1: +3.0 m/s, Heat 2: +2.0 m/s

Rank	Heat	Athlete	Nationality	Time	Notes
1	1	Deji Aliu	Nigeria	10.25	Q
2	1	Ibrahim Meité	Ivory Coast	10.30	Q
3	1	Toby Box	Great Britain	10.34	Q
3	2	David Oaks	United States	10.34	Q
5	1	Terrence Bowen	United States	10.38	Q
6	2	Obadele Thompson	Barbados	10.42	Q
7	2	Kostyantyn Rurak	Ukraine	10.48	Q
8	1	Frutos Feo	Spain	10.49	
8	2	Paul White	Great Britain	10.49	Q
10	1	Vitaly Medvedev	Kazakhstan	10.52	
10	2	Masato Ebisawa	Japan	10.52	
12	1	Carlos Bernardo Moreno	Chile	10.53	
13	2	Alejandro Cárdenas	Mexico	10.62	
14	1	Georgios Theodoridis	Greece	10.63	
15	2	Daniel Cojocaru	Romania	10.65	
16	2	Alessandro Orlandi	Italy	10.74	

=== Final ===
Wind: +1.3 m/s

Rank	Lane	Athlete	Nationality	Time	Notes
1st place, gold medalist(s)	5	David Oaks	United States	10.28	
2nd place, silver medalist(s)	3	Obadele Thompson	Barbados	10.34	
3rd place, bronze medalist(s)	7	Terrence Bowen	United States	10.36	
4	4	Deji Aliu	Nigeria	10.37	
5	2	Toby Box	Great Britain	10.39	
6	1	Paul White	Great Britain	10.45	
7	8	Kostyantyn Rurak	Ukraine	10.70	
8	6	Ibrahim Meité	Ivory Coast	11.14	
