= Athletics at the 1998 Commonwealth Games – Men's 200 metres =

Men's 200 metres at the Commonwealth Games

The men's 200 metres event at the 1998 Commonwealth Games was held 18–19 September on National Stadium, Bukit Jalil.

== Medalists ==
Gold	Silver	Bronze
Julian Golding; England	Christian Malcolm; Wales	John Regis; England

== Results ==
=== Heats ===
Qualification: First 3 of each heat (Q) and the next 8 fastest qualified for the quarterfinals.

Wind:
Heat 1: +0.3 m/s, Heat 2: +0.1 m/s, Heat 7: +0.3 m/s

Rank	Heat	Name	Nationality	Time	Notes
1	1	Darryl Wohlsen	Australia	20.68	Q
2	6	Anninos Marcoullides	Cyprus	20.69	Q
3	2	Chris Donaldson	New Zealand	20.70	Q
4	8	Aziz Zakari	Ghana	20.72	Q
5	8	Douglas Walker	Scotland	20.77	Q
6	2	John Regis	England	20.78	Q, SB
7	3	Douglas Turner	Wales	20.83	Q
8	2	Stephen Brimacombe	Australia	20.89	Q
9	3	Tanko Braimah	Ghana	20.90	Q
10	5	O'Brian Gibbons	Canada	20.92	Q
10	6	Christian Malcolm	Wales	20.92	Q
12	5	Julian Golding	England	20.94	Q
13	6	Michael Nicolini	Canada	20.95	Q
14	7	Matt Shirvington	Australia	20.96	Q
15	6	Garth Robinson	Jamaica	21.09	q
15	8	Allyn Condon	England	21.09	Q
17	1	Marcus la Grange	South Africa	21.11	Q
18	5	James Henthorn	Wales	21.13	Q
19	4	Eric Milazar	Mauritius	21.20	Q
20	8	Matthew Coad	New Zealand	21.26	q
21	1	Philip Mukomana	Zimbabwe	21.28	Q
22	7	Mojalefa Mosili	Lesotho	21.37	Q
23	3	Justice Dipeba	Botswana	21.44	Q
24	2	Nazmizan Muhamad	Malaysia	21.47	q, PB
25	8	Ian Craig	Northern Ireland	21.49	q
26	1	Soloveni Nakaunicina	Fiji	21.50	q
27	7	Benjamin Sirimou	Cameroon	21.53	Q
28	3	Azmi Ibrahim	Malaysia	21.60	q
29	5	Paul McBurney	Northern Ireland	21.65	q
30	2	Jone Delai	Fiji	21.68	q
31	3	Hamkah Afik	Singapore	21.73	
32	8	Raman Ganeshwaran	Malaysia	21.78	
33	4	Moses Mila Mayat	Uganda	21.82	Q
34	7	Nigel Jones	Grenada	21.96	
35	4	Aminiasi Babitu	Fiji	21.99	Q
35	5	Alieu Kamara	Sierra Leone	21.99	
37	1	Alpha B. Kamara	Sierra Leone	22.02	
38	1	Kwame Galloway	Montserrat	22.07	
39	6	Dalle Delor	Cameroon	22.12	
39	7	Tobias Akwenye	Namibia	22.12	
41	5	Jackson Ngumbi	Zambia	22.21	
42	3	Laurence Jack	Vanuatu	22.32	
43	2	Cusman Jatta	Gambia	22.34	
44	5	Ismaila Jammeh	Gambia	22.54	
45	4	Matarr Njie	Gambia	22.59	
46	7	Silas Helo	Solomon Islands	22.92	
47	2	Leron Francis	Saint Vincent and the Grenadines	23.05	
48	6	Aneri Canon	Nauru	23.17	PB
49	6	Dale Aymer	Montserrat	23.46	
50	7	Thyroid Smith	Turks and Caicos Islands	23.48	
51	3	David Lightbourne	Turks and Caicos Islands	23.94	
	1	Ibrahim Manik	Maldives	DNS	
	4	Mohamed Amir	Maldives	DNS	
	4	Peter Pulu	Papua New Guinea	DNS	
	4	Obadele Thompson	Barbados	DNS	
	7	N'kosie Barnes	Antigua and Barbuda	DNS	
	8	Mark Phills	Saint Vincent and the Grenadines	DNS	

=== Quarterfinals ===
Qualification: First 4 of each heat qualified directly (Q) for the semifinals.

Wind:
Heat 1: 0.0 m/s, Heat 2: -0.1 m/s, Heat 3: +0.3 m/s, Heat 4: +0.1 m/s

Rank	Heat	Name	Nationality	Time	Notes
1	2	Anninos Marcoullides	Cyprus	20.48	Q
2	4	Julian Golding	England	20.51	Q
3	4	Christian Malcolm	Wales	20.53	Q
4	2	John Regis	England	20.58	Q, SB
5	3	Chris Donaldson	New Zealand	20.61	Q
6	4	Aziz Zakari	Ghana	20.64	Q
7	1	Douglas Walker	Scotland	20.67	Q
8	1	Douglas Turner	Wales	20.68	Q
9	1	Stephen Brimacombe	Australia	20.77	Q
10	2	Matt Shirvington	Australia	20.78	Q
11	4	Darryl Wohlsen	Australia	20.84	Q
12	3	Marcus la Grange	South Africa	20.85	Q
13	3	Allyn Condon	England	20.90	Q
14	1	Garth Robinson	Jamaica	20.93	Q
15	3	Tanko Braimah	Ghana	20.97	Q
16	2	Michael Nicolini	Canada	21.01	Q
17	3	James Henthorn	Wales	21.02	PB
18	1	Moses Mila Mayat	Uganda	21.05	
19	2	Matthew Coad	New Zealand	21.12	
19	3	O'Brian Gibbons	Canada	21.12	
21	4	Philip Mukomana	Zimbabwe	21.14	
22	1	Eric Milazar	Mauritius	21.16	
23	2	Benjamin Sirimou	Cameroon	21.28	
24	3	Nazmizan Muhamad	Malaysia	21.46	
25	4	Ian Craig	Northern Ireland	21.51	
26	4	Soloveni Nakaunicina	Fiji	21.52	
27	4	Azmi Ibrahim	Malaysia	21.65	
28	3	Justice Dipeba	Botswana	21.72	
29	1	Jone Delai	Fiji	21.74	
30	2	Aminiasi Babitu	Fiji	21.76	
31	2	Mojalefa Mosili	Lesotho	21.85	
	1	Paul McBurney	Northern Ireland	DNS	

=== Semifinals ===
Qualification: First 4 of each heat qualified directly (Q) for the final.

Wind:
Heat 1: -0.5 m/s, Heat 2: -0.7 m/s

Rank	Heat	Name	Nationality	Time	Notes
1	2	Julian Golding	England	20.34	Q, PB
2	1	Anninos Marcoullides	Cyprus	20.48	Q
3	2	John Regis	England	20.49	Q, SB
4	2	Matt Shirvington	Australia	20.55	Q
5	2	Chris Donaldson	New Zealand	20.55	Q
6	1	Christian Malcolm	Wales	20.56	Q
7	1	Darryl Wohlsen	Australia	20.59	Q
8	2	Douglas Turner	Wales	20.64	
9	1	Douglas Walker	Scotland	20.68	Q
10	1	Aziz Zakari	Ghana	20.70	
11	2	Stephen Brimacombe	Australia	20.80	
12	1	Michael Nicolini	Canada	20.95	
13	2	Garth Robinson	Jamaica	21.04	
14	1	Marcus la Grange	South Africa	21.05	
15	1	Allyn Condon	England	21.06	
16	2	Tanko Braimah	Ghana	21.25	

=== Final ===
Wind: -0.2 m/s

Rank	Lane	Name	Nationality	Time	Notes
1st place, gold medalist(s)	5	Julian Golding	England	20.18	
2nd place, silver medalist(s)	3	Christian Malcolm	Wales	20.29	
3rd place, bronze medalist(s)	4	John Regis	England	20.40	
4	6	Anninos Marcoullides	Cyprus	20.43	
5	8	Darryl Wohlsen	Australia	20.48	
6	7	Matt Shirvington	Australia	20.53	
7	1	Chris Donaldson	New Zealand	20.62	
8	2	Douglas Walker	Scotland	20.69	
