= 1992 World Junior Championships in Athletics – Men's 100 metres =

The men's 100 metres event at the 1992 World Junior Championships in Athletics was held in Seoul, South Korea, at Olympic Stadium on 16 and 17 September.

== Medalists ==
Gold	Ato Boldon; Trinidad and Tobago
Silver	Darren Campbell; United Kingdom
Bronze	Tony McCall; United States

== Results ==
=== Final ===
17 September
Wind: 0.0 m/s

Rank	Name	Nationality	Time	Notes
1st place, gold medalist(s)	Ato Boldon	Trinidad and Tobago	10.30	
2nd place, silver medalist(s)	Darren Campbell	United Kingdom	10.46	
3rd place, bronze medalist(s)	Tony McCall	United States	10.49	
4	Oumar Loum	Senegal	10.51	
5	Jason Fergus	United Kingdom	10.54	
6	Marc Blume	Germany	10.57	
7	Takeshi Arakawa	Japan	10.64	
8	Paul Egonye	Nigeria	10.70	

=== Semifinals ===
17 September

==== Semifinal 1 ====
Wind: +0.1 m/s

Rank	Name	Nationality	Time	Notes
1	Darren Campbell	United Kingdom	10.52	Q
2	Tony McCall	United States	10.58	Q
3	Oumar Loum	Senegal	10.58	Q
4	Takeshi Arakawa	Japan	10.70	Q
5	Glen Elferink	South Africa	10.79	
6	Tony Ogbeta	Nigeria	10.89	
7	Sultan Mohamed Al-Sheib	Qatar	10.95	
8	Won Ho-Kwon	South Korea	10.99	

==== Semifinal 2 ====
Wind: +0.4 m/s

Rank	Name	Nationality	Time	Notes
1	Ato Boldon	Trinidad and Tobago	10.42	Q
2	Marc Blume	Germany	10.53	Q
3	Paul Egonye	Nigeria	10.61	Q
4	Jason Fergus	United Kingdom	10.62	Q
5	Curtis Johnson	United States	10.64	
6	Ji Haisheng	China	10.76	
7	Ibrahim Meité	Côte d'Ivoire	10.77	
8	Eric Frempong-Manso	Canada	10.85	

=== Quarterfinals ===
16 September

==== Quarterfinal 1 ====
Wind: +1.8 m/s

Rank	Name	Nationality	Time	Notes
1	Ato Boldon	Trinidad and Tobago	10.29	Q
2	Takeshi Arakawa	Japan	10.48	Q
3	Glen Elferink	South Africa	10.58	Q
4	Won Ho-Kwon	South Korea	10.64	Q
5	Rafael Gruszecki	Germany	10.67	
6	Jason Shelton	Jamaica	10.76	
7	Markus Ineichen	Switzerland	10.80	
8	Alejandro Cárdenas	Mexico	10.83	

==== Quarterfinal 2 ====
Wind: +1.9 m/s

Rank	Name	Nationality	Time	Notes
1	Oumar Loum	Senegal	10.46	Q
2	Tony McCall	United States	10.47	Q
3	Paul Egonye	Nigeria	10.55	Q
4	Ji Haisheng	China	10.68	Q
5	Luis Vega	Colombia	10.76	
6	Alexis Tellez	Cuba	10.79	
7	Marian Gogoase	Romania	10.83	
8	Jair Moreira	Brazil	10.88	

==== Quarterfinal 3 ====
Wind: -0.2 m/s

Rank	Name	Nationality	Time	Notes
1	Darren Campbell	United Kingdom	10.37	Q
2	Marc Blume	Germany	10.43	Q
3	Sultan Mohamed Al-Sheib	Qatar	10.58	Q
4	Ibrahim Meité	Côte d'Ivoire	10.62	Q
5	Alfredo García	Cuba	10.63	
6	Danilo Barzio	Italy	10.70	
7	Ku Wai Ming	Hong Kong	10.74	
8	Todd Blythe	New Zealand	10.79	

==== Quarterfinal 4 ====
Wind: +0.6 m/s

Rank	Name	Nationality	Time	Notes
1	Curtis Johnson	United States	10.51	Q
2	Jason Fergus	United Kingdom	10.53	Q
3	Eric Frempong-Manso	Canada	10.67	Q
4	Tony Ogbeta	Nigeria	10.68	Q
5	Mark Keddell	New Zealand	10.72	
6	László Kiss	Hungary	10.74	
7	Alessandro De Micheli	Italy	10.75	
	Ye Hu	China	DNS	

=== Heats ===
16 September

==== Heat 1 ====
Wind: +0.7 m/s

Rank	Name	Nationality	Time	Notes
1	Ato Boldon	Trinidad and Tobago	10.33	Q
2	Ye Hu	China	10.66	Q
3	Danilo Barzio	Italy	10.72	Q
4	Ku Wai Ming	Hong Kong	10.81	Q
5	Marian Gogoase	Romania	10.84	q
6	Phil Chiodo	Australia	11.06	

==== Heat 2 ====
Wind: +3.0 m/s

Rank	Name	Nationality	Time	Notes
1	Oumar Loum	Senegal	10.48 w	Q
2	Marc Blume	Germany	10.53 w	Q
3	Paul Egonye	Nigeria	10.58 w	Q
4	Mark Keddell	New Zealand	10.62 w	Q
5	Won Ho-Kwon	South Korea	10.64 w	q
6	Alfredo García	Cuba	10.65 w	q
7	Carlos Villaseñor	Mexico	11.01 w	
8	Abate Abayneh	Ethiopia	11.44 w	

==== Heat 3 ====
Wind: -0.2 m/s

Rank	Name	Nationality	Time	Notes
1	Curtis Johnson	United States	10.64	Q
2	Ji Haisheng	China	10.66	Q
3	Sultan Mohamed Al-Sheib	Qatar	10.67	Q
4	Markus Ineichen	Switzerland	10.82	Q
5	Jair Moreira	Brazil	10.82	q
6	Christopher Allison	Jamaica	11.01	
7	Kazumitsu Okihara	Japan	11.16	

==== Heat 4 ====
Wind: +1.4 m/s

Rank	Name	Nationality	Time	Notes
1	Jason Fergus	United Kingdom	10.44	Q
2	Ibrahim Meité	Côte d'Ivoire	10.64	Q
3	Glen Elferink	South Africa	10.70	Q
4	László Kiss	Hungary	10.73	Q
5	Tony Ogbeta	Nigeria	10.78	q
6	Alejandro Cárdenas	Mexico	10.79	q
7	Firdhouse Saiyat Hassan	Singapore	11.21	
8	Kent Dennie	Saint Vincent and the Grenadines	11.53	

==== Heat 5 ====
Wind: +1.5 m/s

Rank	Name	Nationality	Time	Notes
1	Tony McCall	United States	10.44	Q
2	Takeshi Arakawa	Japan	10.56	Q
3	Rafael Gruszecki	Germany	10.71	Q
4	Alexis Tellez	Cuba	10.71	Q
5	Alessandro De Micheli	Italy	10.75	q
6	Bryan Skinner	Australia	10.87	
7	Thaniya Lopez	Barbados	11.06	

==== Heat 6 ====
Wind: +2.6 m/s

Rank	Name	Nationality	Time	Notes
1	Darren Campbell	United Kingdom	10.40 w	Q
2	Jason Shelton	Jamaica	10.62 w	Q
3	Eric Frempong-Manso	Canada	10.64 w	Q
4	Luis Vega	Colombia	10.66 w	Q
5	Todd Blythe	New Zealand	10.70 w	q
6	Wendell Faria	Suriname	10.87 w	
7	Erwin Susanto	Indonesia	10.98 w	

== Participation ==
According to an unofficial count, 43 athletes from 31 countries participated in the event.

- Australia (2)
- Barbados (1)
- Brazil (1)
- Canada (1)
- China (2)
- Colombia (1)
- Côte d'Ivoire (1)
- Cuba (2)
- Ethiopia (1)
- Germany (2)
- Hong Kong (1)
- Hungary (1)
- Indonesia (1)
- Italy (2)
- Jamaica (2)
- Japan (2)
- Mexico (2)
- New Zealand (2)
- Nigeria (2)
- Qatar (1)
- Romania (1)
- Saint Vincent and the Grenadines (1)
- Senegal (1)
- Singapore (1)
- South Africa (1)
- South Korea (1)
- Suriname (1)
- Switzerland (1)
- Trinidad and Tobago (1)
- United Kingdom (2)
- United States (2)
