= 1992 World Junior Championships in Athletics – Men's 4 × 100 metres relay =

The men's 4×100 metres relay event at the 1992 World Junior Championships in Athletics was held in Seoul, South Korea, at Olympic Stadium on 19 and 20 September.

== Medalists ==
Gold	Allyn Condon; Darren Campbell; Jamie Baulch; Jason Fergus; United Kingdom
Silver	George Page; Milton Mallard; Tony McCall; Curtis Johnson; United States
Bronze	Tony Ogbeta; Deji Aliu; Uche Olisa; Paul Egonye; Nigeria

== Results ==
=== Final ===
20 September

Rank	Nation	Competitors	Time	Notes
1st place, gold medalist(s)	United Kingdom	Allyn Condon; Darren Campbell; Jamie Baulch; Jason Fergus	39.21	
2nd place, silver medalist(s)	United States	George Page; Milton Mallard; Tony McCall; Curtis Johnson	39.59	
3rd place, bronze medalist(s)	Nigeria	Tony Ogbeta; Deji Aliu; Uche Olisa; Paul Egonye	39.88	
4	Jamaica	Leon Gordon; Christopher Allison; Warren Johnson; Jason Shelton	40.06	
5	Cuba	Alexis Tellez; Héctor Fuentes; Rayne Padron; Alfredo García	40.13	
6	Japan	Kazumitsu Okihara; Tadakazu Ohashi; Keita Hiraga; Takeshi Arakawa	40.62	
7	Italy	Alessandro De Micheli; Danilo Barzio; Raffaele Mangialardi; Pierpaolo Cacciotti	41.32	
8	South Korea	Lee Byung-Kwon; Park Jae-Il; U Dong-Uk; Won Ho-Kwon	45.36	

=== Heats ===
19 September

==== Heat 1 ====
Rank	Nation	Competitors	Time	Notes
1	United States	George Page; Milton Mallard; Tony McCall; Curtis Johnson	39.83	Q
2	Cuba	Alexis Tellez; Héctor Fuentes; Rayne Padron; Alfredo García	40.44	Q
3	Italy	Alessandro De Micheli; Danilo Barzio; Raffaele Mangialardi; Pierpaolo Cacciotti	40.78	q
4	Mexico	Eduardo Fernández; Alejandro Cárdenas; César Jongitud; Arturo Castillon	42.12	
5	Germany	Patrick Amarteifio; Rafael Gruszecki; Holger Blume; Marc Blume	43.93	
	Australia	Phil Chiodo; Bryan Skinner; Darryl Wohlsen; Brad Figures	DNF	

==== Heat 2 ====
Rank	Nation	Competitors	Time	Notes
1	United Kingdom	Allyn Condon; Darren Campbell; Jamie Baulch; Jason Fergus	39.48	Q
2	Jamaica	Leon Gordon; Christopher Allison; Warren Johnson; Jason Shelton	40.28	Q
3	Nigeria	Tony Ogbeta; Deji Aliu; Uche Olisa; Paul Egonye	40.58	q
4	South Korea	Lee Byung-Kwon; Park Jae-Il; U Dong-Uk; Won Ho-Kwon	40.93	q
5	Japan	Kazumitsu Okihara; Tadakazu Ohashi; Keita Hiraga; Takeshi Arakawa	40.97	q
6	Canada	Marlon Dechausey; Eric Frempong-Manso; David Anderson; Mark Graham	43.44	
	Brazil	Jair Moreira; Cleverson da Silva; Emerson Perin; Nélson Ferreira	DNF	

== Participation ==
According to an unofficial count, 52 athletes from 13 countries participated in the event.

- Australia (4)
- Brazil (4)
- Canada (4)
- Cuba (4)
- Germany (4)
- Italy (4)
- Jamaica (4)
- Japan (4)
- Mexico (4)
- Nigeria (4)
- South Korea (4)
- United Kingdom (4)
- United States (4)
