= 1998 European Athletics Indoor Championships – Men's 200 metres =

The men's 200 metres event at the 1998 European Athletics Indoor Championships was held 28 February–1 March.

== Medalists ==
| Gold | Silver | Bronze |
|---|---|---|
| Serhiy Osovych; Ukraine | Anninos Marcoullides; Cyprus | Allyn Condon; Great Britain |

== Results ==
=== Heats ===
First 2 from each heat (Q) and the next 1 fastest (q) qualified for the semifinals.

| Rank | Heat | Name | Nationality | Time | Notes |
|---|---|---|---|---|---|
| 1 | 4 | Anninos Marcoullides | Cyprus | 20.72 | Q |
| 2 | 5 | Serhiy Osovych | Ukraine | 20.85 | Q |
| 3 | 1 | Allyn Condon | Great Britain | 20.87 | Q |
| 4 | 2 | Julian Golding | Great Britain | 20.90 | Q |
| 4 | 6 | Thomas Sbokos | Greece | 20.90 | Q |
| 6 | 4 | Yeoryios Panayiotopoulos | Greece | 20.92 | Q |
| 7 | 3 | Martin Lachkovics | Austria | 20.93 | Q |
| 8 | 4 | Anton Ivanov | Bulgaria | 21.04 | q |
| 9 | 6 | Prodromos Katsantonis | Cyprus | 21.06 | Q |
| 10 | 7 | Doug Turner | Great Britain | 21.08 | Q |
| 11 | 7 | Marc Foucan | France | 21.09 | Q |
| 12 | 1 | Kevin Widmer | Switzerland | 21.10 | Q |
| 13 | 2 | Alexios Alexopoulos | Greece | 21.15 | Q |
| 14 | 3 | Miklós Gyulai | Hungary | 21.18 | Q |
| 15 | 7 | Petko Yankov | Bulgaria | 21.21 | |
| 16 | 3 | Gary Ryan | Ireland | 21.23 | |
| 17 | 2 | Andrey Fedoriv | Russia | 21.32 | |
| 18 | 5 | Tommy Kafri | Israel | 21.37 | Q, NR |
| 19 | 5 | Olivier Ernst | Belgium | 21.40 | |
| 20 | 6 | Sergejs Inšakovs | Latvia | 21.41 | |
| 21 | 1 | Tom Comyns | Ireland | 21.42 | |
| 22 | 6 | Patrick Snoek | Netherlands | 21.49 | |
| 23 | 7 | Stéphane Diriwächter | Switzerland | 21.50 | |
| 24 | 1 | Venancio José | Spain | 21.51 | |
| 25 | 2 | Juan Vicente Trull | Spain | 21.52 | |
| 26 | 4 | Francisco Javier Navarro | Spain | 21.58 | |
| 27 | 4 | Daniel Cojocaru | Romania | 21.62 | |
| 28 | 1 | Gábor Dobos | Hungary | 21.80 | |
| 28 | 2 | Reşat Oğuz | Turkey | 21.80 | |
| 30 | 7 | Mario Bonello | Malta | 22.30 | NR |
| | 3 | John Ertzgaard | Norway | DNS | |
| | 5 | Rodrigue Nordin | France | DNS | |
| | 5 | Ryszard Pilarczyk | Poland | DNS | |

=== Semifinals ===
First 2 from each semifinal qualified directly (Q) for the final.

| Rank | Heat | Name | Nationality | Time | Notes |
|---|---|---|---|---|---|
| 1 | 2 | Serhiy Osovych | Ukraine | 20.53 | Q |
| 2 | 1 | Allyn Condon | Great Britain | 20.69 | Q |
| 3 | 3 | Anninos Marcoullides | Cyprus | 20.81 | Q |
| 4 | 1 | Prodromos Katsantonis | Cyprus | 20.88 | Q |
| 5 | 1 | Thomas Sbokos | Greece | 20.91 | |
| 6 | 3 | Doug Turner | Great Britain | 20.93 | Q |
| 7 | 2 | Julian Golding | Great Britain | 20.94 | Q |
| 8 | 3 | Martin Lachkovics | Austria | 20.96 | |
| 9 | 2 | Yeoryios Panayiotopoulos | Greece | 21.11 | |
| 10 | 1 | Marc Foucan | France | 21.31 | |
| 11 | 3 | Alexios Alexopoulos | Greece | 21.44 | |
| 12 | 3 | Miklós Gyulai | Hungary | 21.49 | |
| 13 | 2 | Kevin Widmer | Switzerland | 21.56 | |
| 14 | 1 | Anton Ivanov | Bulgaria | 21.57 | |
| 15 | 2 | Tommy Kafri | Israel | 21.65 | |

=== Final ===
| Rank | Lane | Name | Nationality | Time | Notes |
|---|---|---|---|---|---|
| 1st place, gold medalist(s) | 6 | Serhiy Osovych | Ukraine | 20.40 | NR |
| 2nd place, silver medalist(s) | 5 | Anninos Marcoullides | Cyprus | 20.65 | NR |
| 3rd place, bronze medalist(s) | 4 | Allyn Condon | Great Britain | 20.68 | |
| 4 | 3 | Julian Golding | Great Britain | 20.84 | |
| 5 | 2 | Doug Turner | Great Britain | 21.51 | |
| 6 | 1 | Prodromos Katsantonis | Cyprus | 22.49 | |
