= John Mena =

Colombian sprinter

Personal information
- Full name: John Jairo Mena
- Born: 23 February 1968 (age 58)
- Education: Universidad Central de Bogotá

Sport
- Sport: Athletics
- Events: 100 metres; 200 metres; 400 metres
Medal record
Representing Colombia
Central American and Caribbean Games
Bronze medal – third place	1993 Ponce	4x100m relay

John Jairo Mena (born 23 February 1968) is a retired Colombian sprinter. He won a gold medal in the 100 metres at the 1989 South American Championships.

== International competitions ==
Year	Competition	Venue	Position	Event	Notes
Representing Colombia
1989	Bolivarian Games	Maracaibo, Venezuela	8th	200 m	22.75
1989	Bolivarian Games	Maracaibo, Venezuela	2nd	4 × 100 m relay	40.91
1989	South American Championships	Medellín, Colombia	1st	100 m	10.4
1989	South American Championships	Medellín, Colombia	5th (h)	200 m	21.41^{1}
1989	South American Championships	Medellín, Colombia	2nd	4 × 100 m relay	39.87
1990	Ibero-American Championships	Manaus, Brazil	7th	200 m	22.05
1992	Ibero-American Championships	Seville, Spain	7th	200 m	22.05
1992	Ibero-American Championships	Seville, Spain	5th	4 × 100 m relay	40.50
1993	South American Championships	Lima, Peru	7th	100 m	10.98
1993	Central American and Caribbean Games	Ponce, Puerto Rico	8th	100 m	10.85
1993	Central American and Caribbean Games	Ponce, Puerto Rico	3rd	4 × 100 m relay	40.09
1995	South American Championships	Manaus, Brazil	6th	100 m	10.63
1995	South American Championships	Manaus, Brazil	2nd	4 × 100 m relay	40.31
1995	Pacific Ocean Games	Cali, Colombia	1st	4 × 100 m relay	39.81
1995	Central American and Caribbean Championships	Guatemala City, Guatemala	3rd	4 × 100 m relay	39.65
1995	Universiade	Fukuoka, Japan	26th (q)	100 m	10.81
1995	Universiade	Fukuoka, Japan	31st (q)	200 m	21.93

^{1}Disqualified in the final

== Personal bests ==
Outdoor

- 100 meters – 10.2h (Medellín 1993)
