= 1996 European Athletics Indoor Championships – Men's 200 metres =

The men's 200 metres event at the 1996 European Athletics Indoor Championships was held in Stockholm Globe Arena on 9–10 March.

== Medalists ==
Gold	Silver	Bronze
Erik Wijmeersch; Belgium	Alexios Alexopoulos; Greece	Torbjörn Eriksson; Sweden

== Results ==
=== Heats ===
The winner of each heat (Q) and the next 5 fastest runners-up (q) qualified for the semifinals.

Rank	Heat	Name	Nationality	Time	Notes
1	1	Alexios Alexopoulos	Greece	20.93	Q
2	7	Torbjörn Eriksson	Sweden	21.14	Q
3	2	Erik Wijmeersch	Belgium	21.23	Q
4	5	Thomas Sbokos	Greece	21.26	Q
5	7	Allyn Condon	Great Britain	21.27	q
6	4	Holger Blume	Germany	21.36	Q
7	3	Anton Ivanov	Bulgaria	21.52	Q
7	6	Martin Lachkovics	Austria	21.52	Q
9	6	Christophe Cheval	France	21.53	q
10	2	Marlon Devonish	Great Britain	21.54	q
11	6	Aleksandr Streltsov	Ukraine	21.57	
12	3	Patrick van Balkom	Netherlands	21.63	q
13	1	Gonzalo Corroto	Spain	21.66	q
14	5	Reşat Oğuz	Turkey	22.29	
	1	Anninos Marcoullides	Cyprus	DQ	
	2	Robert Maćkowiak	Poland	DQ	
	4	Doug Turner	Great Britain	DQ	
	4	Sergejs Inšakovs	Latvia	DQ	
	5	Andrey Fedoriv	Russia	DQ	
	6	Vadim Zadoinov	Moldova	DNF	
	3	Marc Blume	Germany	DNS	
	7	Bülent Eren	Turkey	DNS	

=== Semifinals ===
The winner of each semifinal (Q) and the next 1 fastest (q) qualified for the final. The subsequent 4 fastest qualified for the B final.

Rank	Heat	Name	Nationality	Time	Notes
1	1	Torbjörn Eriksson	Sweden	21.10	Q
2	2	Erik Wijmeersch	Belgium	21.11	Q
3	2	Thomas Sbokos	Greece	21.12	q
4	1	Holger Blume	Germany	21.13	qB
5	3	Alexios Alexopoulos	Greece	21.20	Q
6	2	Allyn Condon	Great Britain	21.34	qB
7	1	Christophe Cheval	France	21.38	qB
7	3	Anton Ivanov	Bulgaria	21.38	qB
9	3	Martin Lachkovics	Austria	21.41	
10	2	Patrick van Balkom	Netherlands	21.69	
11	1	Marlon Devonish	Great Britain	21.86	
12	3	Gonzalo Corroto	Spain	21.99	

=== Final ===
Rank	Name	Nationality	Time	Notes
1st place, gold medalist(s)	Erik Wijmeersch	Belgium	21.04	
2nd place, silver medalist(s)	Alexios Alexopoulos	Greece	21.05	
3rd place, bronze medalist(s)	Torbjörn Eriksson	Sweden	21.07	
4	Thomas Sbokos	Greece	21.74	

==== B final ====
Rank	Name	Nationality	Time	Notes
1	Holger Blume	Germany	21.42	
2	Anton Ivanov	Bulgaria	21.45	
3	Christophe Cheval	France	21.58	
	Allyn Condon	Great Britain	DNS	
