= 1995 IAAF World Indoor Championships – Men's 200 metres =

The men's 200 metres event at the 1995 IAAF World Indoor Championships was held on 10–11 March 1995.

The winning margin was 0.36 seconds which is the greatest winning margin in the men's 200 metres at these championships. Since this event was discontinued for men and women after the 2004 championships, this record cannot be broken.

== Medalists ==
Gold	Silver	Bronze
Geir Moen; Norway	Troy Douglas; Bermuda	Sebastián Keitel; Chile

== Results ==
=== Heats ===
First 2 of each heat (Q) and next 6 fastest (q) qualified for the semifinals.

Rank	Heat	Name	Nationality	Time	Notes
1	1	Niklas Eriksson	Sweden	21.04	Q
1	6	Geir Moen	Norway	21.04	Q
3	1	Serhiy Osovych	Ukraine	21.11	Q
4	5	Torbjörn Eriksson	Sweden	21.21	Q
5	5	John Regis	Great Britain	21.21	Q
6	1	Sebastián Keitel	Chile	21.24	q
7	6	Troy Douglas	Bermuda	21.27	Q
8	3	Donovan Bailey	Canada	21.33	Q
9	4	Marc Foucan	France	21.35	Q
10	2	Solomon Wariso	Great Britain	21.39	Q
11	6	Georgios Panagiotopoulos	Greece	21.24	q
12	3	Thomas Sbokos	Greece	21.45	Q
13	4	Daniel Cojocaru	Romania	21.47	Q
14	5	Erik Wymeersch	Belgium	21.48	q
15	4	Jordi Mayoral	Spain	21.54	q
16	1	Koji Ito	Japan	21.55	q
17	2	Rod Tolbert	United States	21.57	Q
18	2	Francisco Navarro	Spain	21.61	q
19	3	Steve Brimacombe	Australia	21.73	
20	3	Keith Smith	United States Virgin Islands	21.81	
21	5	Miguel Janssen	Aruba	21.90	
22	2	Angelo Cipolloni	Italy	21.92	
23	5	Boèvi Lawson	Togo	21.96	
24	6	Brahim Abdoulaye	Chad	22.10	NR
25	2	Bülent Eren	Turkey	22.15	
26	2	Marco Belizaire	Panama	22.45	
27	3	Valentin Ngbogo	Central African Republic	22.46	
28	6	Mohamed Ould Brahim	Mauritania	23.94	
29	4	Sergi Vidal	Andorra	24.45	
	4	Tod Long	United States	DQ	R141.3
	1	Haroun Korjie	Sierra Leone	DNS	

=== Semifinals ===
First 2 of each semifinal qualified directly (Q) for the final.

Rank	Heat	Name	Nationality	Time	Notes
1	1	Geir Moen	Norway	20.59	Q
2	2	Troy Douglas	Bermuda	20.93	Q
3	1	John Regis	Great Britain	20.94	Q
4	2	Donovan Bailey	Canada	21.06	Q
5	2	Torbjörn Eriksson	Sweden	21.06	PB
6	3	Sebastián Keitel	Chile	21.07	Q
7	3	Serhiy Osovych	Ukraine	21.13	Q
8	3	Niklas Eriksson	Sweden	21.15	
9	1	Marc Foucan	France	21.17	
10	2	Thomas Sbokos	Greece	21.32	
11	1	Francisco Navarro	Spain	21.64	
12	3	Rod Tolbert	United States	21.72	
13	1	Daniel Cojocaru	Romania	21.74	
14	3	Koji Ito	Japan	21.77	
15	2	Erik Wymeersch	Belgium	21.94	
16	1	Georgios Panagiotopoulos	Greece	21.95	
17	2	Jordi Mayoral	Spain	22.06	
	3	Solomon Wariso	Great Britain	DNF	

=== Final ===
Rank	Name	Nationality	Time	Notes
1st place, gold medalist(s)	Geir Moen	Norway	20.58	
2nd place, silver medalist(s)	Troy Douglas	Bermuda	20.94	
3rd place, bronze medalist(s)	Sebastián Keitel	Chile	20.98	
4	Donovan Bailey	Canada	21.08	
	Serhiy Osovych	Ukraine	DNS	
	John Regis	Great Britain	DNS	
