= Alejandro Cárdenas =

Mexican sprinter

Personal information
- Full name: Alejandro Manuel Cárdenas Robles
- Born: 4 October 1974 (age 51) Hermosillo, Mexico
- Height: 1.86 m (6 ft 1 in)
- Weight: 73 kg (161 lb)

Sport
- Sport: Athletics
- Events: 100 metres, 400 metres, Decathlon
- Coached by: Andrzej Piotrowski

Alejandro Manuel Cárdenas Robles (born October 4, 1974) is a retired track & field athlete from Mexico. He is married to high jumper athlete Romary Rifka.

== Career ==
After forming part of the Mexican 4 × 100 metres relay in the 1992 Summer Olympics, he opted for the decathlon.

In 1995 he earned a bronze medal in the Pan American Games in the decathlon and another bronze as a member of the 4 × 100 relays.

During 1996, he specialized in the 400 m dashes, in which he participated in the 1996 Summer Olympics, and qualified for the semifinals with a time of 45.33 s.

In 1998 he participated in the Central American and Caribbean Games in the 400 m dash, in which he earned a bronze medal.

Cárdenas also participated in 1999 at the IAAF World Indoor Championships in the 400 m dash, in which he earned a bronze medal. That same year he also participated in the World Championships in Athletics, where he ran a personal record of 44.31 s, which earned him third place.

In his last Pan American Games, he took home third place in the 400m dash.

Cárdenas played an active role in the 2000 Summer Olympics, in the 400 m dash, running 46.14 s in the First Round, and 45.66 in the semifinals, where he did not advance.

Cárdenas participated in the 2004 Summer Olympics, in the 400 m dash, running 45.46 s in the first round, and 45.64 s in the semifinals, in which he did not advance.

In 2005 Cárdenas participated in the World Championships, in Helsinki, Finland, being eliminated in the first round with a time of 46.73 s.

== International competitions ==
Year	Competition	Venue	Position	Event	Notes
Representing Mexico
1992	Central American and Caribbean; Junior Championships (U-20)	Tegucigalpa, Honduras	3rd	100 m	10.6 (0.0 m/s)
1992	Ibero-American Championships	Seville, Spain	4th	4 × 100 m relay	40.29
1992	Olympic Games	Barcelona, Spain	—	4 × 100 m relay	DSQ
1992	World Junior Championships	Seoul, South Korea	29th (qf)	100m	10.83 (+1.8 m/s)
1992	World Junior Championships	Seoul, South Korea	28th (h)	200m	21.88 (+0.7 m/s)
1992	World Junior Championships	Seoul, South Korea	9th (h)	4 × 100 m relay	42.12
1992	World Junior Championships	Seoul, South Korea	14th (h)	4 × 400 m relay	3:19.47
1993	World Championships	Stuttgart, Germany	16th (h)	4 × 100 m relay	39.79
1994	Ibero-American Championships	Mar del Plata, Argentina	2nd	4 × 400 m relay	3:07.75
1994	Ibero-American Championships	Mar del Plata, Argentina	4th	Decathlon	7.015 pts W
1995	Pan American Games	Mar del Plata, Argentina	3rd	4 × 100 m relay	39.77
1995	Pan American Games	Mar del Plata, Argentina	5th	4 × 400 m relay	3:08.04
1995	Pan American Games	Mar del Plata, Argentina	3rd	Decathlon	7387 pts
1995	World Championships	Gothenburg, Sweden	18th (h)	4 × 100 m relay	39.66
1995	World Championships	Gothenburg, Sweden	18th (h)	4 × 400 m relay	3:07.22
1995	Universiade	Fukuoka, Japan	13th (sf)	100 m	10.62
1995	Universiade	Fukuoka, Japan	5th	4 × 100 m relay	40.14
1996	Ibero-American Championships	Medellín, Colombia	1st	4 × 100 m relay	39.60
1996	Ibero-American Championships	Medellín, Colombia	2nd	Decathlon	7614 pts
1996	Olympic Games	Atlanta, United States	18th (qf)	400 m	45.33
1997	World Indoor Championships	Paris, France	10th (sf)	400 m	46.50
1997	World Indoor Championships	Paris, France	9th (h)	4 × 400 m relay	3:11.41
1997	World Championships	Athens, Greece	28th (qf)	400 m	46.63
1998	Ibero-American Championships	Lisbon, Portugal	1st	400 m	45.04
1998	Ibero-American Championships	Lisbon, Portugal	1st	4 × 400 m relay	3:06.12
1998	Central American and Caribbean Games	Maracaibo, Venezuela	3rd	400 m	45.22
1998	Central American and Caribbean Games	Maracaibo, Venezuela	4th	4 × 400 m relay	3:04.80
1999	World Indoor Championships	Maebashi, Japan	3rd	400 m	46.02 NR
1999	World Championships	Seville, Spain	3rd	400 m	44.31 PB
1999	Pan American Games	Winnipeg, Canada	3rd	400 m	44.92
2000	Olympic Games	Sydney, Australia	23rd (qf)	400 m	45.66
2001	Central American and Caribbean Championships	Guatemala City, Guatemala	3rd	400 m	45.85 A
2001	World Championships	Edmonton, Canada	14th (h)	4 × 400 m relay	3:03.19 NR
2004	Ibero-American Championships	Huelva, Spain	3rd	400 m	45.22
2004	Olympic Games	Athens, Greece	16th (sf)	400 m	45.64
2005	World Championships	Helsinki, Finland	35th (h)	400 m	46.73 SB

=== Personal bests ===
- 200 metres – 20.63 s (1998)
- 400 metres – 44.31 s (1999)
- Decathlon – 7,614 points (1996)

== See also ==
- Mexican records in athletics
