= 1998 European Athletics Championships – Men's 200 metres =

Men's 200 metres at the 1998 European Athletics Championships
- Venue: Népstadion
- Location: Budapest
- Dates: 20 August (heats); 21 August (semi-finals & final)
- Competitors: 31 from 22 nations
- Winning time: 20.53

Medalists
| gold medal | Douglas Walker | Great Britain |
| silver medal | Douglas Turner | Great Britain |
| bronze medal | Julian Golding | Great Britain |

The men's 200 metres at the 1998 European Athletics Championships was held at the Népstadion on 20 and 21 August.

== Results ==
=== Round 1 ===
Qualification: First 3 in each heat (Q) and the next 4 fastest (q) advance to the Semifinals.

==== Heat 1 ====
| Rank | Athlete | Nation | Time | Notes |
|---|---|---|---|---|
| 1 | Julian Golding | Great Britain | 20.39 | Q, SB |
| 2 | Troy Douglas | Netherlands | 20.55 | Q, SB |
| 3 | Christophe Cheval | France | 20.59 | Q, NR |
| 4 | Georgios Panagiotopoulos | Greece | 21.05 | q |
| 5 | Daniel Bittner | Germany | 21.09 | |
| 6 | Martin Morkes | Czech Republic | 21.14 | |
| 7 | Piotr Balcerzak | Poland | 21.22 | |
| 8 | Martin Plesnicar | Slovenia | 21.35 | |
| | | | Wind: -1.2 m/s | |

==== Heat 2 ====
| Rank | Athlete | Nation | Time | Notes |
|---|---|---|---|---|
| 1 | Prodromos Katsantonis | Cyprus | 20.76 | Q |
| 2 | Alessandro Attene | Italy | 20.95 | Q |
| 3 | Erik Wijmeersch | Belgium | 21.02 | Q |
| 4 | Manuel Milde | Germany | 21.08 | |
| 5 | Tommy Kafri | Israel | 21.09 | |
| 6 | Harri Kivelä | Finland | 21.14 | |
| 7 | Martin Brinarský | Slovakia | 21.32 | |
| 8 | Kevin Widmer | Switzerland | 21.37 | |
| | | | Wind: -0.9 m/s | |

==== Heat 3 ====
| Rank | Athlete | Nation | Time | Notes |
|---|---|---|---|---|
| 1 | Douglas Turner | Great Britain | 20.63 | Q |
| 2 | Anninos Marcoullides | Cyprus | 20.74 | Q |
| 3 | Gary Ryan | Ireland | 20.76 | Q, SB |
| 4 | Patrick van Balkom | Netherlands | 20.88 | q |
| 5 | Reşat Oğuz | Turkey | 21.10 | |
| 6 | Panagiotis Sarris | Greece | 21.24 | |
| 7 | Mario Bonello | Malta | 21.65 | |
| – | Marcin Urbaś | Poland | DNF | |
| | | | Wind: -0.8 m/s | |

==== Heat 4 ====
| Rank | Athlete | Nation | Time | Notes |
|---|---|---|---|---|
| 1 | Rodrigue Nordin | France | 20.52 | Q |
| 2 | Geir Moen | Norway | 20.64 | Q |
| 3 | Douglas Walker | Great Britain | 20.67 | Q |
| 4 | Torbjörn Eriksson | Sweden | 20.85 | q, SB |
| 5 | Petko Yankov | Bulgaria | 20.89 | q |
| 6 | Javier Navarro | Spain | 21.22 | |
| 7 | Paul Brizzel | Ireland | 21.25 | |
| | | | Wind: -0.6 m/s | |

=== Semi-finals ===
Qualification: First 4 in each heat (Q) advance to the Final.

==== Heat 1 ====
| Rank | Athlete | Nation | Time | Notes |
|---|---|---|---|---|
| 1 | Julian Golding | Great Britain | 20.61 | Q |
| 2 | Troy Douglas | Netherlands | 20.65 | Q |
| 3 | Prodromos Katsantonis | Cyprus | 20.80 | Q |
| 4 | Christophe Cheval | France | 20.87 | Q |
| 5 | Torbjörn Eriksson | Sweden | 21.00 | |
| 6 | Alessandro Attene | Italy | 21.04 | |
| 7 | Georgios Panagiotopoulos | Greece | 21.15 | |
| 8 | Erik Wijmeersch | Belgium | DQ | |
| | | | Wind: 0.0 m/s | |

==== Heat 2 ====
| Rank | Athlete | Nation | Time | Notes |
|---|---|---|---|---|
| 1 | Douglas Walker | Great Britain | 20.74 | Q |
| 2 | Douglas Turner | Great Britain | 20.89 | Q |
| 3 | Rodrigue Nordin | France | 21.00 | Q |
| 4 | Geir Moen | Norway | 21.01 | Q |
| 5 | Patrick van Balkom | Netherlands | 21.04 | |
| 6 | Petko Yankov | Bulgaria | 21.08 | |
| 7 | Anninos Marcoullides | Cyprus | 21.14 | |
| 8 | Gary Ryan | Ireland | 21.28 | |
| | | | Wind: -1.8 m/s | |

=== Final ===
| Rank | Athlete | Nation | Time | Notes |
|---|---|---|---|---|
| 1st place, gold medalist(s) | Douglas Walker | Great Britain | 20.53 | |
| 2nd place, silver medalist(s) | Douglas Turner | Great Britain | 20.64 | |
| 3rd place, bronze medalist(s) | Julian Golding | Great Britain | 20.72 | |
| 4 | Geir Moen | Norway | 20.78 | |
| 5 | Rodrigue Nordin | France | 20.83 | |
| 6 | Christophe Cheval | France | 20.91 | |
| 7 | Prodromos Katsantonis | Cyprus | 21.24 | |
| – | Troy Douglas | Netherlands | DQ | |
| | | | Wind: -1.0 m/s | |
