= Erik Wijmeersch =

Belgian sprinter

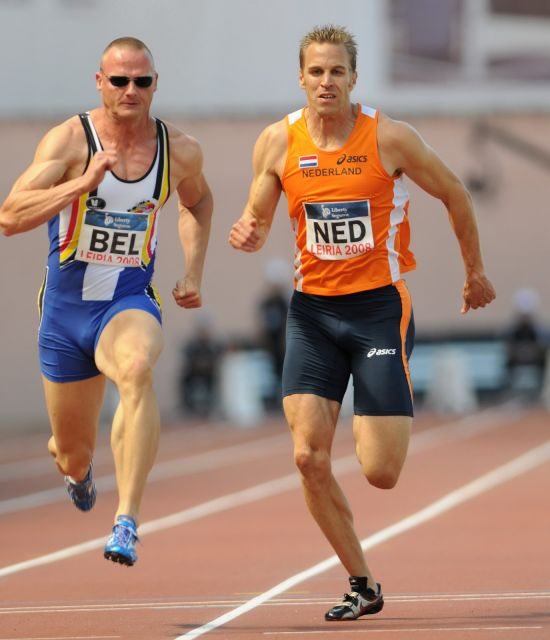
- Wijmeersch (left) at the 2008 European Cup

Medal record

Men's athletics

Representing Belgium

European Athletics Indoor Championships
Gold medal – first place	1996 Stockholm	200 m

Erik Wijmeersch (born 23 January 1970) is a Belgian former track and field athlete who competed in sprinting events. His greatest success was a gold medal in the 200 metres at the European Athletics Indoor Championships in 1996. His best time of 20.66 remains the Belgian indoor record for the event. He also holds bests of 10.17 seconds for the 100 metres and 6.69 seconds for the indoor 60 metres.

He represented his country at the 1996 Summer Olympics and competed for Belgium at four consecutive World Championships in Athletics from 1995 to 2001. He helped set a 4 × 100 metres relay national record on his final appearance at that competition. He was a four-time participant at the IAAF World Indoor Championships and a four-time medallist at the lower league European Cup meetings. He won 19 national titles in sprint events, combining indoor and outdoors.

After his retirement, he admitted to doping during 2 years of his career in his autobiography. However, his performances were not annulled as he did not fail any drug tests over that period.

== Career ==
=== Early career ===
Born in Sint-Niklaas, East Flanders, He made his first impact at national level in 1992 when he won the Belgian indoor title in the 200 metres as well as the outdoor under-23 title in the distance. He retained his indoor title in 1993 and won his first national title at the Belgian Athletics Championships in 1995 with a personal best of 20.80 seconds.

=== European champion and Olympic debut ===
Wijmeersch made his international debut at the 1995 IAAF World Indoor Championships, making it to the semi-finals of the 200 m competition. He made his first appearance at the World Championships in Athletics that same year, although he failed to make it out of the heats at that event.

The following season brought major success in the form of the gold medal at the 1996 European Athletics Indoor Championships, which he won in a time of 21.04 seconds. He had a personal best time of 20.68 at the Meeting Pas de Calais – that time ranked him in the top ten globally that season. He remained in good form in the outdoor season, setting two personal bests with wins in Tallinn, running 10.23 for the 100 metres and 20.42 seconds for the 200 m. His first outdoor medal came shortly after at the European Cup 2nd League, where he was the 100 m champion. An Olympic debut came at the 1996 Atlanta Games and he reached the quarter-finals in both the 100 m and 200 m while representing Belgium.

=== Later international career ===
He represented Belgium at two global competitions in the next season: he was a semi-finalist at the 1997 IAAF World Indoor Championships in the 200 m and a quarter-finalist in both short sprints at the 1997 World Championships in Athletics. He won a further regional gold medal at the European 1st League meeting. Wijmeersch set personal bests at all distances that year: 6.74 seconds for the 60 metres, 10.17 seconds for the 100 m, a Belgian indoor record of 20.66 seconds for the 200 m, 32.52 seconds for the 300 metres, and 47.57 seconds for the 400 metres. In 1998 he took a 100/200 m double at the Belgian Championships and in his sole international outing reached the semi-finals of the 200 m at the 1998 European Athletics Championships. He remained among the Belgian elite the following year but failed to make an impact internationally, being eliminated in the heats stage at both the 1999 IAAF World Indoor Championships and the 1999 World Championships in Athletics.

After a curtailed 2000 season, he returned in 2001 in strong form by winning the 60 m Belgian title in a new best of 6.70 seconds. He matched that time at the 2001 IAAF World Indoor Championships, reaching the semi-finals, but failed to get past the heats in his speciality 200 m when it came to the 2001 World Championships in Athletics. Some success did come at the event, however, as with the Belgian men's 4 × 100 metres relay he helped set a national record of 39.22 seconds. This was his last appearance on the global stage. He won the 2002 Belgian 100 m title and placed fourth in the 200 m at the European Cup 1st League, but his performances declined over the period. He competed at a lower level in the 2003 and 2004 seasons.

=== Final titles and retirement ===
Wijmeersch returned to form in 2005 at the age of 35, setting lifetime indoor bests of 6.69 seconds for the 60 m and 5.80 seconds for the 50 metres. He was the national champion indoors in the short sprint, but did not translate these performances to the outdoor season, in which his best outing was a third-place finish in the 100 m at the Belgian Championships. Better performances came in 2006. He was the over-35 category winner of the 60 m at the World Masters Athletics Indoor Championships and claimed a 100 m individual and relay double at the European Cup 1st League. He ran a season's best of 10.25 seconds for the 100 m – among the fastest times of his career, in spite of his age. He ran in that event at the 2006 European Athletics Championships and was a semi-finalist. It was to be the last major international outing of his career. Passing his mid-thirties, he ran at European Cup meetings for Belgium in 2007 and 2008 but did not medal. He brought his career to a close with a high by taking the 100 m title at the 2008 Belgian Championships.

Following his retirement in 2008, he released an autobiography stated that he had used performance-enhancing drugs during his sprinting career, including testosterone-based products and erythropoietin (EPO), under the supervision of a doctor, Theo Lebon. He also accused Renno Roelandt, vice-president of the Belgian Olympic Committee, of having knowledge of his doping practices.

== Personal bests ==
- 50 metres – 5.80 sec (2005)
- 60 metres – 6.69 sec (2005)
- 100 metres – 10.17 sec (1997)
- 150 metres – 15.92 sec (2001)
- 200 metres – 20.42 sec (1996)
- 200 metres (indoor) – 20.66 sec (1997) NR
- 300 metres – 32.52 sec (1997)
- 400 metres (indoor) – 47.57 sec (1997)

== National titles ==
- Belgian Athletics Championships
  - 100 metres: 1996, 1998, 2002, 2008
  - 200 metres: 1995, 1997, 1998, 1999, 2001
- Belgian Indoor Championships
  - 60 metres: 1998, 1999, 2001, 2005
  - 200 metres: 1992, 1993, 1996, 1997, 2000, 2001

== International competitions ==
Year	Competition	Venue	Position	Event
1995	World Indoor Championships	Barcelona, Spain	5th (semis)	200 metres
1995	World Championships	Gothenburg, Sweden	5th (heats)	200 metres
1996	European Indoor Championships	Stockholm, Sweden	1st	200 metres
1996	European Cup 2nd League	Oordegem, Belgium	1st	100 metres
1996	Olympic Games	Atlanta, United States	5th (q-finals)	100 metres
1996	Olympic Games	Atlanta, United States	4th (q-finals)	200 metres
1997	World Indoor Championships	Paris, France	4th (semis)	200 metres
1997	European Cup 1st League	Dublin, Ireland	1st	200 metres
1997	World Championships	Athens, Greece	6th (q-finals)	100 metres
1997	World Championships	Athens, Greece	5th (q-finals)	200 metres
1998	European Championships	Budapest, Hungary	DQ (semis)	200 metres
1999	World Indoor Championships	Maebashi, Japan	3rd (heats)	200 metres
1999	World Championships	Seville, Span	5th (heats)	100 metres
1999	World Championships	Seville, Span	4th (heats)	200 metres
2001	World Indoor Championships	Lisbon, Portugal	8th (semis)	60 metres
2001	World Championships	Edmonton, Canada	5th (heats)	200 metres
2001	World Championships	Edmonton, Canada	5th (heats)	4 × 100 metres relay
2006	World Masters Athletics Indoor Championships	Linz, Austria	1st	60 metres M35
2006	European Cup 2nd League	Prague, Czech Republic	1st	100 metres
2006	European Championships	Gothenburg, Sweden	7th (semis)	100 metres

== See also ==
- List of doping cases in athletics
