= Alexios Alexopoulos =

Greek sprinter

Personal information
- Born: 21 May 1971 (age 55)

Sport
- Event: 200 metres

Achievements and titles
- Personal bests: 20.36 s, 20.62 s (i)
Medal record
Men's Athletics
Representing Greece
European Indoor Championships
Silver medal – second place	1996 Stockholm	200 m

Alexios Alexopoulos (born 21 May 1971) is a retired Greek sprinter who specialized in the 200 metres.

He won the silver medal at the 1996 European Indoor Championships. He also competed at the 2000 Olympic Games and the World Championships in 1995, 1997 and 1999 without reaching the final. He also competed in the 1999 World Indoor Championships in Maebashi, Japan where he just missed the final.

His personal best time was 20.36 seconds, achieved in June 1999 in Paris. This ranks him fifth among Greek 200 metres sprinters, behind Konstantinos Kenteris, Anastasios Gousis, Thomas Sbokos & Lykourgos-Stefanos Tsakonas.

In the 100 metres his personal best time is 10.16 seconds, achieved in June 1998 in Athens. This ranks him seventh among Greek 100 metres sprinters. He still holds the National record for 200 metres indoor (since 1996) with 20.62 seconds. He also jointly holds the national record for the 4 × 100 metres relay.

== Honours ==
Year	Competition	Venue	Position	Event	Notes
Representing Greece
1990	World Junior Championships	Plovdiv, Bulgaria	13th (h)	4 × 100 m relay	41.00
1993	Mediterranean Games	Narbonne, France	2nd	4 × 100 m relay	39.26 s
1994	European Championships	Helsinki, Finland	30th (qf)	100m	10.69 (wind: -0.3 m/s)
1994	European Championships	Helsinki, Finland	5th	4 × 100 m relay	39.25
1995	World Championships	Gothenburg, Sweden	15th (sf)	200 m	20.78 s
1996	European Indoor Championships	Stockholm, Sweden	2nd	200 m	20.91 s
1998	European Indoor Championships	Valencia, Spain	11th (sf)	200 m	21.44 s
1998	European Championships	Budapest, Hungary	4th	4 × 100 m relay	39.07 s
1999	World Indoor Championships	Maebashi, Japan	7th (sf)	200 m	20.98 s
2000	Olympic Games	Sydney, Australia	9th (sf)	4 × 100 m relay	38.80 s
