= Alfredo García-Baró =

Cuban sprinter (born 1972)

Personal information
- Born: 5 February 1972 (age 54)

Sport
- Sport: Track and field
Medal record
Men's Athletics
Representing Cuba
Summer Universiade
Silver medal – second place	1997 Catania	4x100m relay
Pan American Games
Gold medal – first place	1995 Mar del Plata	4x100m relay
Central American and Caribbean Games
Gold medal – first place	1998 Maracaibo	4x100m relay
Central American and Caribbean Junior Championships
Silver medal – second place	1990 Havana	100 m
Silver medal – second place	1990 Havana	200 m

Alfredo García-Baró (born 5 February 1972) is a Cuban sprinter specializing in the 100 metres.

== Career ==
He finished fourth with the Cuban 4 × 100 metres relay team at the 1997 and 1999 World Championships. On both occasions 2000 Olympic relay bronze medalists Iván García and Luis Alberto Pérez-Rionda were part of the team.

== Achievements ==
Year	Competition	Venue	Position	Event	Notes
Representing Cuba
1990	Central American and Caribbean Junior Championships (U-17)	Havana, Cuba	2nd	100 m	11.04 (-0.2 m/s)
1990	Central American and Caribbean Junior Championships (U-17)	Havana, Cuba	2nd	200 m	22.00 (0.3 m/s)
1990	Central American and Caribbean Junior Championships (U-17)	Havana, Cuba	—	4 × 100 m relay	DQ
1992	World Junior Championships	Seoul, South Korea	13th (qf)	100 m	10.63 (-0.2 m/s)
1992	World Junior Championships	Seoul, South Korea	5th	4 × 100 m relay	40.13
1993	Central American and Caribbean Championships	Cali, Colombia	3rd	4 × 100 m relay	39.72
1997	Central American and Caribbean Championships	San Juan, Puerto Rico	1st	4 × 100 m relay	39.18
1997	World Championships	Athens, Greece	4th	4 × 100 m relay	38.15
1997	Universiade	Catania, Italy	2nd	4 × 100 m relay	38.52
1998	Central American and Caribbean Games	Maracaibo, Venezuela	1st	4 × 100 m relay	38.79
1999	World Championships	Seville, Spain	4th	4 × 100 m relay	38.63
