= Douglas Turner (sprinter) =

British former track and field sprinter (born 1966)

Doug Turner
Personal information
- Nationality: British (Welsh)
- Born: 2 December 1966 (age 59) Newport, Wales

Sport
- Sport: Athletics
- Event: Sprints
- Club: Cardiff AAC
Medal record
Men's athletics
Representing Great Britain
European Championships
Silver medal – second place	1998 Budapest	200 m

Douglas Turner (born 2 December 1966) is a British former track and field sprinter who competed mainly in the 200 metres. He was the silver medallist at the 1998 European Athletics Championships. His personal best for the 200 m was 20.43 seconds, set in 1996. He also represented Great Britain at the 1999 World Championships in Athletics and Wales at the Commonwealth Games in 1998 and 2002.

== Career ==
Born in Newport, Wales, he was a late starter and made his debut at a major outdoor international competition in his thirties. He ran in the heats only at the 1996 European Athletics Indoor Championships and 1997 IAAF World Indoor Championships. He came to prominence during a period of strong sprint competition in Wales, with Christian Malcolm, Jamie Baulch and Tim Benjamin among his contemporaries. Both he and Malcolm were members of Cardiff Amateur Athletic Club and worked with coach Jock Anderson.

At the national level, Turner won the 200 m Welsh title on three occasions, having back-to-back wins in 1995 and 1996 before taking his final title in 2001. His winning time of 20.54 seconds in 2001 was a record for the meet. He was also twice a 200 m winner at the AAA Indoor Championships, topping the podium in 1996 and 2002. He achieved his personal best of 20.43 seconds in 1996. He managed fifth for Great Britain at the 1998 IAAF World Cup, recording a time of 20.51 seconds, but failed to get past the semi-finals at the 1998 Commonwealth Games. At that competition he was part of the 4 × 100 metres relay team and placed fourth in a team of Malcolm, James Henthorn, and Kevin Williams.

The 1998 season proved to be the high point of his career. First he placed fifth at the 1998 European Athletics Indoor Championships. Following this he won his only major international medal in the 200 m final at the 1998 European Athletics Championships, taking the silver medal as part of a British medal sweep alongside winner Douglas Walker and Julian Golding.

Turner ran at the 1999 World Championships in Athletics, but failed to make the final. His final year of competition came in 2002, when he ran in the 200 m heats at the 2002 European Athletics Indoor Championships and was a semi-finalist at the 2002 Commonwealth Games. Following these performances, and his advancing years, the national sports body Elite Cmyru dropped him from their funding programme, which brought about his retirement from the sport.

He received a three-month doping ban after a positive test for ephedrine in 2000. This also brought about an Olympic ban by the British Olympic Association, but an appeal to the body overturned the ban on the basis that only small traces were found in his system and that the consumption of the drug was unintentional.

== Personal bests ==
- 100 metres – 10.37 (2001)
- 200 metres – 20.43 (1996)
- 60 metres (indoor) – 6.69 (2002)
- 200 metres (indoor) – 20.59 (2002)

== National titles ==
- Welsh Athletics Championships
  - 200 m: 1995, 1996, 2001
- AAA Indoor Championships
  - 200 m: 1996, 2002

== International competitions ==
Year	Competition	Venue	Position	Event	Notes
1996	European Athletics Indoor Championships	Stockholm, Sweden	—	200 m	DQ
1997	World Indoor Championships	Paris, France	5th (heats)	200 m	21.90
1998	European Indoor Championships	Valencia, Spain	5th	200 m	21.51
1998	European Championships	Budapest, Hungary	2nd	200 m	20.64
1998	World Cup	Johannesburg, South Africa	5th	200 m	20.51
1998	Commonwealth Games	Kuala Lumpur, Malaysia	5th (semis)	200 m	20.64
1998	Commonwealth Games	Kuala Lumpur, Malaysia	4th	4 × 100 m relay	38.73
1999	World Championships	Seville, Spain	8th (q-finals)	200 m	21.08
2002	European Indoor Championships	Vienna, Austria	3rd (semis)	200 m	20.84
2002	Commonwealth Games	Manchester, United Kingdom	7th (semis)	200 m	21.11
2002	Commonwealth Games	Manchester, United Kingdom	8th	4 × 100 m relay	39.73

== See also ==
- List of European Athletics Championships medalists (men)
