= Trevino Betty =

Canadian sprinter (born 1971)

Personal information
- Born: 10 October 1971 (age 54) Toronto, Ontario, Canada

Sport
- Sport: Track and field
Medal record
Representing Canada
Commonwealth Games
Silver medal – second place	1998 Kuala Lumpur	4x100m relay
Pan American Games
Silver medal – second place	1999 Winnipeg	4x100m relay

Trevino Betty (born 10 October 1971) is a retired Canadian sprinter who specialized in the 100 metres.

With the Canadian relay team he competed at the 1999 World Championships, but the team was disqualified in the heat. He however helped in winning a relay silver medal at the 1998 Commonwealth Games and at the 1999 Pan American Games.

His personal best time was 10.27 seconds, achieved in August 1999 in Monachil.

Betty also became Canadian long jump champion in 1996.
