= Peter Hargraves =

American sprinter (born 1972)

Personal information
- Born: August 30, 1972 (age 54)

Sport
- Sport: Track and field
Medal record
Representing United States
Summer Universiade
Gold medal – first place	1995 Fukuoka	4x100m relay

Peter Hargraves (born August 30, 1972) is an American retired sprinter.
