= Tanko Braimah =

Ghanaian sprinter (born 1979)

Tanko Braimah (born 12 May 1979) is a Ghanaian sprinter who specialized in the 200 metres.

He competed at both the 2000 and 2004 Olympic Games, but without success. In 2000 he was disqualified in the 200 metres heats for lane infringement. In 2004 he competed in the 4 x 100 metres relay, but the team was knocked out in the heat.

His personal best times are 6.72 in the 60 metres, achieved in January 2006 in Ann Arbor, MI; 10.31 in the 100 metres, achieved in July 2003 in Ypsilanti, MI; and 20.62 seconds in the 200 metres, achieved in May 1999 in Clemson, SC.
