= Anthuan Maybank =

American sprinter

Personal information
- Born: December 30, 1969 (age 56) Georgetown, South Carolina, U.S.
- Height: 6 ft 2 in (1.88 m)
- Weight: 179 lb (81 kg)

Achievements and titles
- Personal best: 400 m: 44.15 (Lausanne 1996)
Medal record
Men's athletics
Representing the United States
Olympic Games
Gold medal – first place	1996 Atlanta	4 × 400 metres relay
Summer Universiade
Gold medal – first place	1995 Fukuoka	200 metres

Anthuan Maybank (born December 30, 1969) is a retired 1996 Olympic Games gold medalist in the men's 4x400 meter relay for the United States. Maybank ran the last leg for the United States and shrugged off an attack from Roger Black (UK) who had won a silver medal in the individual event. Maybank was not a well-known athlete at the time. But, a few weeks later, he confirmed his talent by winning the 400 m race at the prestigious meeting in Zürich.

Anthuan was born in Georgetown, South Carolina. He was coached by "Sweet" Freddie Young at Georgetown High where he set the current state record in the 400 m (46.67). He attended the University of Iowa on a full athletic scholarship, where he was an All-American in the 400 m and long jump. He currently resides in Delaware and is the sprint coach for the Tatnall School.

== See also ==
- World Fit
