= Ku Wai Ming =

Hong Kong sprinter

Personal information
- Nationality: Hong Konger
- Born: 11 September 1973 (age 52) [Hong Kong]
- Height: 168 cm (5 ft 6 in)
- Weight: 63 kg (139 lb)

Sport
- Sport: Sprinting
- Event: 100 metres

Ku Wai Ming (born 11 September 1973) is a Hong Kong sprinter. Graduated from St. Paul's College. He competed in the men's 100 metres at the 1992 Summer Olympics.
