= Curtis Johnson (sprinter) =

American sprinter (born 1973)

Personal information
- Born: December 21, 1979 (age 46) Miami, Florida, U.S.

Sport
- Country: United States
- Sport: Athletics

Curtis Johnson (born December 21, 1979) is a retired American sprinter.

Running for the University of Missouri track and field team, Johnson won the 2002 NCAA Division I Outdoor Track and Field Championships in the 4 × 100 m.

He competed in the 100 metres at the 1997 World Junior Championships, the 2000 Summer Olympics and the 2001 World Championships without reaching the final. At the 1998World Junior Championships he won a silver medal in the 4 × 100 metres relay.

His personal best times were 6.70 seconds in the 60 metres, achieved in February 2001 in New York; 10.03 seconds in the 100 metres, achieved in July 2000 in Sacramento; and 20.77 seconds in the 200 metres, achieved in August 1999 in Jacksonville Fl.

Johnson was born in Miami Fl.
