= Allyn Condon =

British sprinter and bobsledder

Personal information
- Nationality: British (English)
- Born: 24 August 1974 (age 51) Liverpool, England
- Height: 178 cm (5 ft 10 in)
- Weight: 85 kg (187 lb)

Sport
- Sport: Athletics, Bobsleigh
- Event(s): Sprinting, two-man bobsleigh, four-man bobsleigh,
- Club: Sale Harriers
Medal record
Men's athletics
Representing Great Britain
World Championships
Silver medal – second place	1999 Seville	4 × 100 m relay
World Indoor Championships
Bronze medal – third place	1999 Maebashi	4 × 400 m relay
European Championships
Gold medal – first place	1998 Budapest	4 × 100 m relay
World Cup
Gold medal – first place	1998 Johannesburg	4 × 100 m relay
Bronze medal – third place	1992 Cuba	4 × 400 m relay
European Cup
Gold medal – first place	1998 Saint Petersburg	4 × 100 m relay
World Junior Championships
Gold medal – first place	1992 Seoul	4 × 100 m relay
European Junior Championships
Gold medal – first place	1991 Thessaloniki	4 × 400 m relay
Gold medal – first place	1993 San Sebastian	4 × 100 m relay
Gold medal – first place	1993 San Sebastian	4 × 400 m relay
European Youth Olympics
Gold medal – first place	1991 Brussels	400 m
Gold medal – first place	1991 Brussels	4 × 400 m relay
Representing England
Commonwealth Games
Gold medal – first place	2002 Manchester	4 × 100 m relay

Allyn Condon (born 24 August 1974) is an English former sprinter and bobsleigher. At the Vancouver Olympic Games in 2010 he became the seventh person to have competed for Great Britain in both the Summer and Winter Olympic Games having already competed in the Sydney Olympics in 2000.

== Career ==
=== Athletics ===
Condon has been coached by his father Morris Condon since the age of 10 years. He showed a talent for athletics at an early age when he won two gold medals at the European Youth Olympics in Brussels in 1991 at the age of 16 and then was part of the winning 4 × 400 metres relay team at the European Junior Championships in the same year.

In 1992 he ran first leg in the 4 × 100 metres relay team that took gold at the World Junior Championships in South Korea, breaking the European junior record in the process. He became one of the youngest sportsmen ever to be selected to compete for Great Britain at the World Cup in Cuba, where at the age of 18 he won a bronze medal, his first as a senior athlete.

He was the 200 metres bronze medalist at the 1998 European Athletics Indoor Championships and won 4 × 100 m relay gold medals at the 1998 European Cup and 1998 IAAF World Cup and 1998 European Athletics Championships. Also in 1998 he represented England in the 200 metres event, at the 1998 Commonwealth Games in Kuala Lumpur, Malaysia.

The following year he won AAA indoor gold and a 4 × 400 m relay bronze at the 1999 IAAF World Indoor Championships. At that competition he ran first leg in the team that broke the British indoor record and won a bronze medal. He still holds the British record and is still ranked 5th on the UK all time 200 m indoor rankings. At the outdoor World Championships, he won a silver medal in the event at the 1999 World Championships in Athletics.

In 2000 he was selected for his first Olympic Games in Sydney, where he competed as part of the 4 × 100 m relay team. In August 2001 after competing for Sale Harriers Manchester in a league competition, Allyn collapsed and was later rushed into hospital with renal failure and endocarditis. After spending six weeks in hospital, doctors told Allyn that his athletics career was over.

After a short time out of the sport, he got back to full fitness and in August became the 2002 Commonwealth Games gold medalist in Manchester in the 4 × 100 m relay. Condon flew out to Munich as part of the Great Britain Team for the 2002 European Athletics Championships, but after a dispute with the team management over selection returned home before the event had taken place.

In 2003 he was a finalist in the 200 m at the ((World Indoor Athletics Championships | 2003)) but was unfortunately disqualified after getting two false starts. He refused to leave the track despite the disqualification, holding the event up for a period of around 10 - 15 minutes. After huge support from the home nation crowd, he was allowed to run under protest, but was later disqualified anyway.

=== Switch to bobsleigh ===
After an international athletics career, inspired by the film Cool Runnings, he changed from track and field in 2006 to take on the challenge of bobsleigh.

During his first year in the sport he became a first team regular in both the two-man and four-man events. His best finish at the FIBT World Championships was fifth in the four-man event at St. Moritz in 2007. Condon's best World Cup finish was tenth in a four-man event at Winterberg in 2008.

In 2008 during a race in Germany he hurt his back and returned home to the UK. After having his back scanned, surgeons found he had ruptured an artery on his lower spine and this brought an abrupt end to the season ahead. He returned to the sport in 2009 when the team struggled to find any kind of form on the World cup circuit and had a disappointing World Championships finish.

In 2010 after a season of selection upsets, he was selected to represent Great Britain at the Vancouver Winter Olympic Games, becoming part of a select group to have competed at both the Summer and Winter Olympics. As a bobsledder, Condon finished 17th in the four-man event at the 2010 Winter Olympics in Vancouver alongside former track and field teammate Dan Money. A 150 km/h crash that put the Great Britain team on their heads on the bend named 50/50 prevented the four-man team from achieving a top eight finish.

== Athletics statistics ==
=== Personal bests ===
Distance	Time	Location	Date
60 metres (indoor)	6.60 sec	Australia	August 2000
100 metres	10.21 sec	Bedford	14 August 1999
200 metres	20.63 sec	Birmingham	1 January 1997
300 metres	33.08 sec	Loughborough	8 August 1999
200 metres (indoor)	20.53 sec	Birmingham	8 February 1998
400 metres (indoor)	46.23 sec	Birmingham	14 February 1999

=== Competition record ===
Year	Competition	Venue	Position	Event	Notes
Representing Great Britain
1991	European Youth Olympics	Brussels, Belgium	1st	400 m	48.20
1991	European Youth Olympics	Brussels, Belgium	1st	4 × 100 m relay	41.86
1992	World Junior Championships	Seoul, South Korea	1st	4 × 100 m relay	39.21
1992	World Junior Championships	Seoul, South Korea	5th	4 × 400 m relay	3:07.48
1998	European Indoor Championships	Valencia, Spain	3rd	200 metres	20.68
1998	European Championships	Budapest, Hungary	1st	4 × 100 m relay	38.52
1999	World Indoor Championships	Maebashi, Japan	3rd	4 × 400 m relay	3:03.20
