= Vladislav Chernobay =

Kyrgyzstani sprinter

Personal information
- Born: 29 August 1975 (age 51)

Sport
- Sport: Track and field

Vladislav Chernobay (Владислав Чернобай, born 29 August 1975) is a former Kyrgyzstani sprinter who competed in the men's 100m competition at the 1996 Summer Olympics. He recorded a 10.88, not enough to qualify for the next round past the heats. His personal best is 10.55, set in 2002.
