= Carlo Occhiena =

Italian sprinter

Personal information
- Nationality: Italian
- Born: September 24, 1972 (age 53) Turin, Italy
- Height: 1.80 m (5 ft 11 in)
- Weight: 65 kg (143 lb)

Sport
- Country: Italy
- Sport: Athletics
- Event: Sprint
- Club: G.S. Fiamme Oro

Achievements and titles
- Personal bests: 100 m: 10.29 (1993); 200 m: 20.57 (1997)
Medal record
Summer Universiade
Bronze medal – third place	1995 Fukuoka	4x100 m relay

Carlo Occhiena (born 24 September 1972, in Turin) is a former Italian sprinter.

He won five national championships.

== International competitions ==
Year	Competition	Venue	Position	Event	Notes
Representing Italy
1994	European Championships	Helsinki, Finland	23rd (qf)	200 m	21.56 (wind: +0.3 m/s)
1995	Summer Universiade	Fukuoka, Japan	3rd	4 × 100 m relay	39.64

== National titles ==
- Italian Athletics Championships
  - 200 metres: 1998
- Italian Athletics Indoor Championships
  - 200 metres: 1990. 1993, 1998, 1999

== See also ==
- Italian all-time top lists - 200 metres
- Italy national relay team
