= Terrance Bowen =

American sprinter

Personal information
- Born: September 15, 1971 (age 55) Madera County, California, United States

Sport
- Sport: Track and field
Medal record
Representing United States
Summer Universiade
Gold medal – first place	1995 Fukuoka	4x100m relay
Bronze medal – third place	1995 Fukuoka	100m

Terrance E. Bowen (born September 15, 1971) is an American former sprinter.

Bowen was an All-American sprinter for the Fresno State Bulldogs track and field team, finishing 4th in the 100 meters at the 1994 NCAA Division I Outdoor Track and Field Championships.
