= David Oaks (athlete) =

American sprinter

Personal information
- Born: May 12, 1972 (age 54) Norman, Oklahoma, United States

Sport
- Sport: Track and field
Medal record
Representing United States
Summer Universiade
Gold medal – first place	1993 Buffalo	4x100m relay
Gold medal – first place	1995 Fukuoka	100m
Gold medal – first place	1995 Fukuoka	4x100m relay

David Oaks (born May 12, 1972) is an American former sprinter.

Oaks competed for the Oklahoma Sooners track and field team in the NCAA.
