= David Dopek =

American sprinter

Personal information
- Born: February 8, 1973 (age 53) Bolingbrook, Illinois, United States

Sport
- Sport: Track and field
Medal record
Representing United States
Summer Universiade
Gold medal – first place	1995 Fukuoka	4x100m relay
Gold medal – first place	1997 Catania	4x100m relay
Gold medal – first place	1997 Catania	4x400m relay
Silver medal – second place	1995 Fukuoka	200m

David Dopek (born February 8, 1973) is an American former sprinter who is noted for being DePaul University's first ever NCAA Champion, when he won the 1995 NCAA Indoor 200m title.

Dopek was named DePaul's track and field head coach in July 2010 and on Jan. 30, 2010, he was inducted into the DePaul Athletics Hall of Fame.
