= Tony McCall =

American sprinter

Personal information
- Born: June 16, 1974 (age 52) Ocala, Florida, United States

Sport
- Sport: Track and field
Medal record
Representing United States
Summer Universiade
Gold medal – first place	1997 Catania	4x100m relay
World U20 Championships
Silver medal – second place	1992 Seoul	4x100m relay
Bronze medal – third place	1992 Seoul	100m

Tony McCall (born June 16, 1974) is an American retired sprinter.

Running for the North Carolina Tar Heels track and field program, McCall won the 1996 NCAA Division I Outdoor Track and Field Championships in the 4 × 100 m.
