= Darryl Wohlsen =

Australian sprinter

Personal information
- Born: 6 March 1973 (age 53)
Medal record
Men's athletics
Commonwealth Games
Bronze medal – third place	1998 Kuala Lumpur	4 x 100m relay

Darryl Wohlsen (born 6 March 1973) is an Australian former sprinter who competed in the 2000 Summer Olympics. After he and the Australian team advanced, Wohlsen gained attention for mocking the British team after their 4 × 100 m relay team was disqualified.
