= Toby Box =

English sprinter

Personal information
- Nationality: British (English)
- Born: 9 September 1972 (age 54) Stockport, England
- Height: 6 ft (183 cm) 3"

Sport
- Sport: Athletics
- Event: Sprints
- Club: Wolverhampton & Bilston AC

Achievements and titles
- Personal bests: 100m 10.32/10.07w 200m 20.72
Medal record
Athletics
Representing England
Commonwealth Games
Bronze medal – third place	1994 Victoria	4x100m relay
Representing Great Britain
Summer Universiade
Silver medal – second place	1995 Fukuoka	4x100m relay

Tobias Box (born 9 September 1972) is a male former athlete who competed for Great Britain and England.

== Biography ==
Box was a member of Wolverhampton & Bilston AC and finished second behind American Jeff Williams in the 200 metres event at the 1993 AAA Championships but by virtue of being the highest placed British athlete was considered the British 200 metres champion that year.

Box represented England in the 200 metres and won a bronze medal in the 4 x 100 metres event, at the 1994 Commonwealth Games in Victoria, Canada.

After retiring from athletics prematurely in 1998 due to injury, Toby Box worked in property. He qualified as a Chartered Surveyor (MRICS) in 2012 and now works as a Development Surveyor in Kent, England. Toby Box is a noted IT expert.
