= Marián Vanderka =

Slovak sprinter

Personal information
- Nationality: Slovak
- Born: 18 April 1972 (age 54) Ružomberok, Czechoslovakia

Sport
- Sport: Sprinting
- Event: 200 metres

Marián Vanderka (born 18 April 1972) is a Slovak sprinter. He competed in the men's 200 metres at the 2000 Summer Olympics. He also competed in the four-man bobsleigh at the 2002 Winter Olympics.

== See also ==
- List of athletes who competed in both the Summer and Winter Olympic games
