= Tao Wu-shiun =

Taiwanese sprinter (born 1973)

Personal information
- Nationality: Taiwanese
- Born: 8 May 1973 (age 53)

Sport
- Sport: Sprinting
- Event: 200 metres

Tao Wu-shiun (born 8 May 1973) is a Taiwanese sprinter. He competed in the men's 200 metres at the 1996 Summer Olympics.
