= Thomas Sbokos =

Greek sprinter (born 1972)

Personal information
- Born: 10 April 1972 (age 54) Heraklion, Greece

Sport
- Sport: Track and field
Medal record
Representing Greece
Summer Universiade
Bronze medal – third place	1995 Fukuoka	200m

Thomas Sbokos (Greek: Θωμάς Σμπώκος; born 10 April 1972) is a Greek sprinter who specialized in the 200 metres.

He won the bronze medal at the 1995 Summer Universiade and finished fourth at the 1996 European Indoor Championships. He also competed at the 1996 Olympic Games and the World Championships in 1995 and 1997 without reaching the final.

His personal best time was 20.28 seconds, achieved in July 1995 in Patras. This ranks him third among Greek 200 metres sprinters, behind Konstantinos Kenteris and Anastassios Gousis.

== Honours ==
Year	Competition	Venue	Position	Event	Notes
Representing Greece
1995	Summer Universiade	Fukuoka, Japan	3rd	200 m	20.75
1996	European Indoor Championships	Stockholm, Sweden	4th	200 m	21.74
1996	Olympic Games	Atlanta, USA	43rd (h)	200 m	20.88
1998	European Indoor Championships	Valencia, Spain	7th (sf)	200 m	20.91
