= Douglas Walker (sprinter) =

Scottish sprinter

Dougie Walker
Personal information
- Nationality: British (Scottish)
- Born: 28 July 1973 (age 53) Inverness, Scotland

Sport
- Sport: Athletics
- Event: Sprints
- Club: Edinburgh AC
Medal record
Men's athletics
Representing Great Britain
World Championships
| Bronze medal – third place | 1997 Athens | 4x100 m relay |
European Championships
| Gold medal – first place | 1998 Budapest | 200 m |
| Gold medal – first place | 1998 Budapest | 4×100 m relay |
Summer Universiade
| Silver medal – second place | 1995 Fukuoka | 4x100 m relay |
| Bronze medal – third place | 1997 Sicily | 4×100 m relay |

Douglas Walker (born 28 July 1973), also known as Doug or Dougie Walker, is a former Scottish sprinter. He was a relay medallist at the 1997 World Championships in Athletics and at the 1998 European Athletics Championships he claimed a 200 metres/relay gold medal double.

== Biography ==
Educated at George Heriot's School in Edinburgh, in 1998 he became European champion in both 200 metres and 4 × 100 metres relay. With 31.56 seconds he is the European record holder in 300 metres, although this distance is rarely run.

Walker was twice British 200 metres champion after winning the British AAA Championships title at the 1997 AAA Championships and the 1998 AAA Championships.

He tested positive for the anabolic steroid nandrolone in 1998 but was cleared of all charges by a UK Athletics disciplinary committee in 1999. IAAF later overturned that decision, applying their strict liability rule and he received a two-year ban in 2000. Despite an attempted comeback following his suspension, the ban effectively ended his elite level athletics career.

== International competitions ==
| Year | Competition | Venue | Position | Event | Notes |
Representing Great Britain and Scotland
| 1997 | World Championships | Athens, Greece | 3rd | 4 × 100 m relay | |
| 1998 | European Championships | Budapest, Hungary | 1st | 200 metres | |
| 1998 | European Championships | Budapest, Hungary | 1st | 4 × 100 m relay | |
