= Athletics at the 1995 Summer Universiade =

- Dates: 29 August – 3 September
- Host city: Fukuoka, Japan
- Venue: Hakatanomori Athletic Stadium
- Events: 43
- Participation: 938 athletes from 136 nations

At the 1995 Summer Universiade, the athletics events were held at the Hakatanomori Athletic Stadium in Fukuoka, Japan from 29 August to 3 September. A total of 43 events were contested, of which 23 by male and 20 by female athletes.

The medal table ended closely, with the United States, Russia and host nation Japan each winning five gold medals. The United States had the highest number of silver medals (six) while Russia had the largest medal haul with sixteen medals in total. Romania managed four gold medals, all of them in the women's competition, while Italy had the third greatest number of medals with ten. Thirty-six nations reached the medal table in the athletics competition. The gold medals won by sprinter Eswort Coombs from Saint Vincent and the Grenadines and hurdler Nicole Ramalalanirina of Madagascar were their countries' only medals at the 1995 Universiade.

Two Universiade records were broken at the competition: the United States men's 4×400 metres relay team ran a time of 3:00.40 minutes and Italy's Annarita Sidoti set a new 10 km walk record. Furthermore, Šárka Kašpárková equalled the women's triple jump standard. Romania's Gabriela Szabo took two gold medals – winning the 1500 metres and 5000 metres – beginning an international career which would see her win three world titles and an Olympic gold. Future Olympic sprint medallists Obadele Thompson and Ekaterini Thanou were runners-up in the 100 metres races.

Abdelkader Chékhémani, Iulia Negură and Heike Meissner all defended their respective 1993 titles, while Hungary's István Bagyula took his third consecutive pole vault gold medal. Men's hammer throw winner Balázs Kiss went on to win the Olympic title in 1996 and the women's discus throw champion Natalya Sadova was the Olympic silver medallist that same year. The 1990 European champion Dragutin Topić was the winner of the men's high jump.

In the event programme, the women's 3000 metres was replaced by the 5000 metres for the first time, matching the IAAF's changes at the 1995 World Championships in Athletics earlier that August. The 1995 competition featured the last Universiade marathon races, as the distance was replaced by the shorter half marathon event at future editions.

== Medal summary ==
=== Men ===
Event	Gold		Silver		Bronze	
100 metres	David Oaks (USA)	10.28	Obadele Thompson (BAR)	10.34	Terrence Bowen (USA)	10.36
200 metres	Anthuan Maybank (USA)	20.46	Dave Dopek (USA)	20.47	Thomas Sbokos (GRE)	20.75
400 metres	Eswort Coombs (VIN)	45.38	Udeme Ekpeyong (NGR)	45.57	Dmitriy Kosov (RUS)	45.70
800 metres	Hezekiél Sepeng (RSA)	1:47.87	Andrés Manuel Díaz (ESP)	1:48.06	Pavel Soukup (CZE)	1:48.15
1500 metres	Abdelkader Chékhémani (FRA)	3:46.53	Andrea Giocondi (ITA)	3:47.11	Abdelhamid Slimani (ALG)	3:47.43
5000 metres	Katsuhiro Kawauchi (JPN)	13:53.86	Brahim Boulami (MAR)	13:54.05	Maurizio Leone (ITA)	13:54.13
10,000 metres	Yasuyuki Watanabe (JPN)	28:47.78	Stephen Mayaka (KEN)	28:55.02	Gabino Apolonio (MEX)	29:07.95
110 metres hurdles	Jonathan Nsenga (BEL)	13.51	Brian Amos (USA)	13.59	Krzysztof Mehlich (POL)	13.66
400 metres hurdles	Kazuhiko Yamazaki (JPN)	48.58	Octavius Terry (USA)	48.95	Yoshihiko Saito (JPN)	49.18
3000 metres steeplechase	Daniel Njenga (KEN)	8:27.03	Joël Bourgeois (CAN)	8:28.44	Brahim Boulami (MAR)	8:35.53
4 × 100 metres relay	United States (USA); Terrance Bowen; David Oaks; Peter Hargraves; David Dopek	38.96	Great Britain (GBR); Paul White; Toby Box; Douglas Walker; Michael Afilaka	39.39	Italy (ITA); Angelo Cipolloni; Alessandro Orlandi; Carlo Occhiena; Andrea Colombo	39.64
4 × 400 metres relay	United States (USA); Ryan Hayden; Leonard Byrd; Andre Morris; Anthuan Maybank	3:00.40 GR	Russia (RUS); Innokentiy Zharov; Dmitriy Bey; Sergey Voronin; Dmitriy Kosov	3:01.95	Great Britain (GBR); Anthony Williams; Jared Deacon; Gary Jennings; David Grindley	3:02.42
Marathon	Takaki Morikawa (JPN)	2:21:32	Patrick Muturi (KEN)	2:24:29	Kim Ki-Young (KOR)	2:24:43
20 kilometres walk	Daniel García (MEX)	1:24:11	Giovanni Perricelli (ITA)	1:24:19	Arturo Di Mezza (ITA)	1:24:33
High jump	Dragutin Topić (YUG)	2.29 m	Wolfgang Kreissig (GER)	2.29 m	Brendan Reilly (GBR)	2.27 m
Pole vault	István Bagyula (HUN)	5.70 m	Lawrence Johnson (USA)	5.60 m	Nuno Fernandes (POR)	5.55 m
Long jump	Kirill Sosunov (RUS)	8.21 m	Georg Ackermann (GER)	8.21 m	Gregor Cankar (SLO)	8.18 m (w)
Triple jump	Andrey Kurennoy (RUS)	17.30 m	Armen Martirosyan (ARM)	16.82 m	LaMark Carter (USA)	16.62 m
Shot put	Yuriy Bilonog (UKR)	19.70 m	Viktor Bulat (BLR)	19.69 m	Thorsten Herbrand (GER)	18.88 m
Discus throw	Vitaliy Sidorov (UKR)	62.16 m	Frits Potgieter (RSA)	61.38 m	Diego Fortuna (ITA)	61.16 m
Hammer throw	Balázs Kiss (HUN)	79.74 m	Oleksandr Krykun (UKR)	77.06 m	Sergey Gavrilov (RUS)	75.50 m
Javelin throw	Zhang Lianbiao (CHN)	79.30 m	Gregor Högler (AUT)	77.52 m	Andrey Uglov (UKR)	76.16 m
Decathlon	Dezsõ Szabó (HUN)	8051 pts	Sebastian Chmara (POL)	8014 pts	Dmitriy Sukhomazov (BLR)	7971 pts

=== Women ===
Event	Gold		Silver		Bronze	
100 metres	Melanie Paschke (GER)	11.16	Ekaterini Thanou (GRE)	11.30	Mary Tombiri (NGR)	11.43
200 metres (wind: +1.7 m/s)	Du Xiujie (CHN)	22.53	Oksana Dyachenko (RUS)	22.89	Zlatka Georgieva (BUL)	23.04
400 metres	Olabisi Afolabi (NGR)	50.50	Tatyana Chebykina (RUS)	51.01	Yelena Rurak (UKR)	51.76
800 metres	Stella Jongmans (NED)	2:02.13	Svetlana Tverdokhleb (UKR)	2:02.92	Natalie Tait (GBR)	2:03.32
1500 metres	Gabriela Szabo (ROM)	4:11.73	Julie Henner (USA)	4:12.70	Ursula Friedmann (GER)	4:13.32
5000 metres	Gabriela Szabo (ROM)	15:29.86	Silvia Sommaggio (ITA)	15:34.32	Yumi Sato (JPN)	15:35.28
10,000 metres	Iulia Negură (ROM)	32:28.25	Alina Tecuţa (ROM)	32:43.38	Yasuko Kimura (JPN)	33:03.01
100 metres hurdles	Nicole Ramalalanirina (MAD)	13.02	Olena Ovcharova (UKR)	13.07	Svetlana Laukhova (RUS)	13.08
400 metres hurdles	Heike Meissner (GER)	55.57	Ionela Târlea (ROM)	55.99	Tonya Williams (USA)	56.04
4 × 100 metres relay	United States (USA); Cheryl Taplin; Inger Miller; Juan Ball; Kenya Walton	43.58	Russia (RUS); Natalya Anisimova; Oksana Dyachenko; Olga Voronova; Janna Levacheva	44.06	Nigeria (NGR); Ime Akpan; Taiwo Aladefa; Pat Itanyi; Mary Tombiri	44.08
4 × 400 metres relay	Russia (RUS); Ioulia Sotnikova; Natalia Khrouchtcheleva; Elena Andreeva; Tatiana Tchebykina	3:28.32	United States (USA); Nicole Green; Camara Jones; Janeen Jones; Youlanda Warren	3:30.25	Ukraine (UKR); Viktoriya Fomenko; Svetlana Tverdokhleb; Tatyana Movchan; Olena Rurak	3:30.57
Marathon	Masako Kusakaya (JPN)	2:53:03	Nao Otani (JPN)	2:57:09	Kristi Klinnert (USA)	2:57:29
10 kilometres walk	Annarita Sidoti (ITA)	43:22 GR	Rossella Giordano (ITA)	43:30	Larisa Ramazanova (RUS)	43:56
High jump	Viktoriya Fyodorova (RUS)	1.92 m	Svetlana Zalevskaya (KAZ)	1.92 m	Natalia Jonckheere (BEL)	1.88 m
Long jump	Viktoriya Vershynina (UKR)	6.76 m	Sharon Jaklofsky (NED)	6.74 m	Lyudmila Galkina (RUS)	6.55 m
Triple jump	Šárka Kašpárková (CZE)	14.20 m GR=	Lyudmila Dubkova (RUS)	13.87 m	Barbara Lah (ITA)	13.85 m
Shot put	Wu Xianchun (CHN)	18.31 m	Cheng Xiaoyan (CHN)	17.95 m	Corrie de Bruin (NED)	17.82 m
Discus throw	Natalya Sadova (RUS)	62.92 m	Anja Gündler (GER)	60.78 m	Bao Dongying (CHN)	59.30 m
Javelin throw (Old javelin model)	Felicia Ţilea (ROM)	62.16 m	Claudia Isaila (ROM)	61.74 m	Lee Young-Sun (KOR)	61.62 m
Heptathlon	Jane Jamieson (AUS)	6123 pts	Mona Steigauf (GER)	6102 pts	Irina Tyukhay (RUS)	5989 pts

== Medal table ==
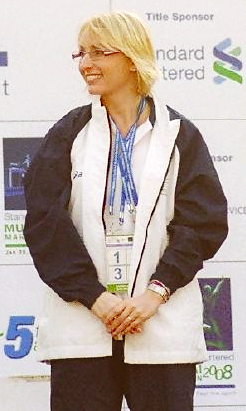
Romania's Gabriela Szabo won two gold medals.

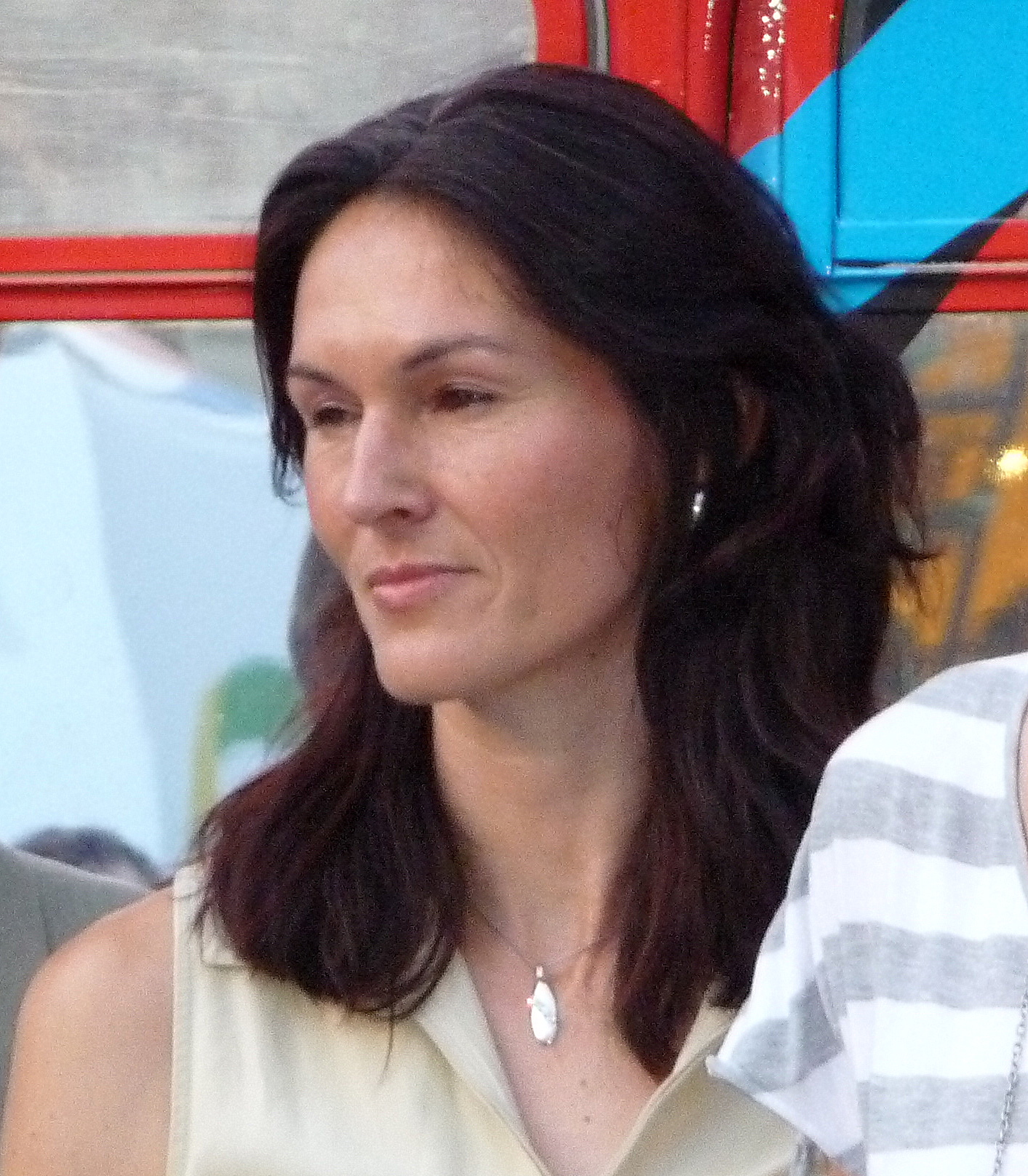
Triple jump champion Šárka Kašpárková won Olympic bronze in 1996.

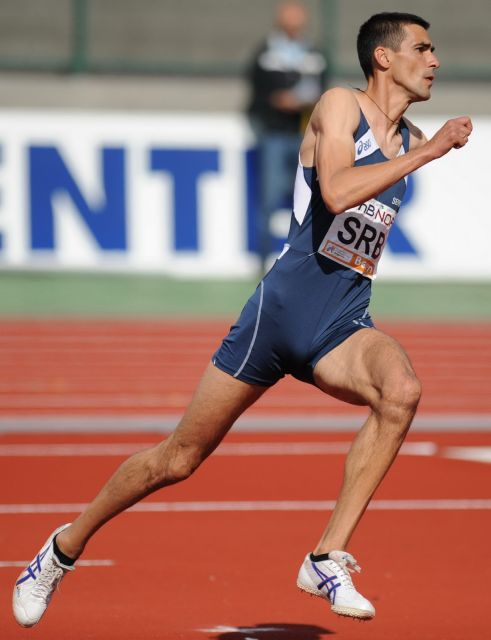
High jump winner Dragutin Topić was Yugoslavia's sole medallist.

* Host nation (Japan)

Rank	Nation	Gold	Silver	Bronze	Total
1	United States	5	6	4	15
2	Russia	5	5	6	16
3	Japan*	5	1	3	9
4	Romania	4	3	0	7
5	Ukraine	3	3	3	9
6	China	3	1	1	5
7	Hungary	3	0	0	3
8	Germany	2	4	2	8
9	Italy	1	4	5	10
10	Kenya	1	2	0	3
11	Nigeria	1	1	2	4
12	Netherlands	1	1	1	3
13	South Africa	1	1	0	2
14	Belgium	1	0	1	2
14	Czech Republic	1	0	1	2
14	Mexico	1	0	1	2
17	Australia	1	0	0	1
17	FR Yugoslavia	1	0	0	1
17	France	1	0	0	1
17	Madagascar	1	0	0	1
17	Saint Vincent and the Grenadines	1	0	0	1
22	Great Britain	0	1	3	4
23	Belarus	0	1	1	2
23	Greece	0	1	1	2
23	Morocco	0	1	1	2
23	Poland	0	1	1	2
27	Armenia	0	1	0	1
27	Austria	0	1	0	1
27	Barbados	0	1	0	1
27	Canada	0	1	0	1
27	Kazakhstan	0	1	0	1
27	Spain	0	1	0	1
33	South Korea	0	0	2	2
34	Algeria	0	0	1	1
34	Bulgaria	0	0	1	1
34	Portugal	0	0	1	1
34	Slovenia	0	0	1	1
Totals (37 entries)		43	43	43	129

== Participating nations ==
- Algeria (6)
- Albania (2)
- American Samoa (1)
- Angola (1)
- Antigua and Barbuda (2)
- Armenia (2)
- Australia (20)
- Austria (5)
- Azerbaijan (3)
- Bangladesh (2)
- Barbados (2)
- Belarus (7)
- Belgium (7)
- Benin (1)
- Bolivia (2)
- Botswana (6)
- Brazil (8)
- Bulgaria (5)
- Burkina Faso (2)
- Burundi (2)
- Cambodia (2)
- Canada (50)
- Cape Verde (1)
- Central African Republic (2)
- Chad (2)
- Chile (9)
- China (17)
- Chinese Taipei (11)
- Colombia (2)
- Comoros (2)
- Costa Rica (2)
- Croatia (2)
- Cyprus (3)
- Czech Republic (6)
- Dominica (2)
- Ecuador (2)
- Equatorial Guinea (2)
- Estonia (2)
- Fiji (2)
- Finland (8)
- France (18)
- Gambia (2)
- Georgia (1)
- Germany (24)
- Ghana (2)
- Great Britain (29)
- Greece (20)
- Grenada (2)
- Guatemala (1)
- Guyana (2)
- Hong Kong (6)
- Haiti (1)
- Hungary (15)
- India (1)
- Iran (2)
- Ireland (2)
- Israel (1)
- Italy (27)
- Ivory Coast (6)
- Jamaica (5)
- Japan (78)
- Jordan (2)
- Kazakhstan (7)
- Kenya (7)
- Kyrgyzstan (4)
- Laos (2)
- Latvia (3)
- Liberia (2)
- Libya (2)
- Macau (11)
- Madagascar (1)
- Malawi (2)
- Malaysia (5)
- Maldives (2)
- Mali (1)
- Malta (2)
- Mauritania (1)
- Mexico (13)
- Moldova (2)
- Morocco (2)
- Mozambique (2)
- Myanmar (2)
- Namibia (9)
- Nepal (2)
- Netherlands (12)
- New Zealand (20)
- Nicaragua (2)
- Niger (2)
- Nigeria (15)
- Pakistan (1)
- Papua New Guinea (2)
- Peru (6)
- Philippines (1)
- Poland (12)
- Portugal (10)
- Puerto Rico (2)
- Republic of the Congo (1)
- Romania (21)
- Russia (45)
- Saint Lucia (1)
- Saint Vincent and the Grenadines (2)
- El Salvador (2)
- San Marino (1)
- São Tomé and Príncipe (1)
- Senegal (1)
- Seychelles (1)
- Sierra Leone (2)
- Singapore (5)
- Slovakia (1)
- Slovenia (7)
- Solomon Islands (1)
- South Africa (19)
- South Korea (10)
- Spain (26)
- Sri Lanka (5)
- Sudan (4)
- Swaziland (2)
- Sweden (1)
- Switzerland (12)
- Tajikistan (1)
- Tanzania (4)
- Togo (2)
- Tonga (2)
- Turkey (6)
- Uganda (6)
- Ukraine (24)
- United Arab Emirates (1)
- United States (79)
- United States Virgin Islands (1)
- Uzbekistan (1)
- Vanuatu (1)
- Vietnam (2)
- Western Samoa (1)
- Yemen (2)
- FR Yugoslavia (3)
- Zimbabwe (1)

== See also ==
- 1995 in the sport of athletics
- FISU World University Games
- University and college sport
