= Sierra Leone at the 2017 World Aquatics Championships =

- Flag of Sierra Leone
- World Aquatics code: SLE
- National federation: Sierra Leone Amateur Swimming, Diving, & Water Polo Association

in Budapest, Hungary
- Competitors: 3 in 1 sport
- Medals: Gold 0 Silver 0 Bronze 0 Total 0

World Aquatics Championships appearances
- 2007; 2009–2011; 2013; 2015; 2017; 2019; 2022; 2023; 2024; 2025

Sierra Leone competed at the 2017 World Aquatics Championships in Budapest, Hungary from 14 July to 30 July.

== Swimming ==
Sierra Leone has received a Universality invitation from FINA to send three swimmers (two men and one woman) to the World Championships.

Athlete	Event	Heat		Semifinal		Final	
Athlete	Event	Time	Rank	Time	Rank	Time	Rank
Moris Beale	Men's 50 m backstroke	DNS		Did not advance			
Moris Beale	Men's 50 m breaststroke	35.13	75	Did not advance			
Osman Kamara	Men's 50 m freestyle	DNS		Did not advance			
Osman Kamara	Men's 50 m butterfly	33.70	81	Did not advance			
Bunturabie Jalloh	Women's 50 m freestyle	40.63	87	Did not advance			
Bunturabie Jalloh	Women's 50 m breaststroke	49.38	51	Did not advance			
