= Sierra Leone at the 2023 World Aquatics Championships =

- Flag of Sierra Leone
- FINA code: SLE
- National federation: Sierra Leone Amateur Swimming, Diving and Water Polo Association

in Fukuoka, Japan
- Competitors: 2 in 1 sport
- Medals: Gold 0 Silver 0 Bronze 0 Total 0

World Aquatics Championships appearances
- 2007; 2009–2011; 2013; 2015; 2017; 2019; 2022; 2023; 2024

Sierra Leone is set to compete at the 2023 World Aquatics Championships in Fukuoka, Japan from 14 to 30 July.

== Swimming ==
Sierra Leone entered 4 swimmers.

Men

| Athlete | Event | Heat | | Semifinal | | Final | |
| Athlete | Event | Time | Rank | Time | Rank | Time | Rank |
|---|---|---|---|---|---|---|---|
| Ibrahim Kamara | 50 metre backstroke | Did not start | | | | | |
| Ibrahim Kamara | 50 metre breaststroke | Did not start | | | | | |
| Joshua Wyse | 50 metre freestyle | 27.89 | 107 | Did not advance | | | |
| Joshua Wyse | 50 metre butterfly | 30.08 | 86 | Did not advance | | | |

Women

| Athlete | Event | Heat | | Semifinal | | Final | |
| Athlete | Event | Time | Rank | Time | Rank | Time | Rank |
|---|---|---|---|---|---|---|---|
| Olamide Sam | 50 metre freestyle | 48.58 | 102 | Did not advance | | | |
| Olamide Sam | 50 metre breaststroke | Disqualified | | Did not advance | | | |
| Ruth Turay | 50 metre backstroke | Did not start | | | | | |
| Ruth Turay | 50 metre butterfly | Did not start | | | | | |
