= Sierra Leone at the 2019 World Aquatics Championships =

- Flag of Sierra Leone
- FINA code: SLE
- National federation: Sierra Leone Amateur Swimming, Diving and Water Polo Association

in Gwangju, South Korea
- Competitors: 3 in 1 sport
- Medals: Gold 0 Silver 0 Bronze 0 Total 0

World Aquatics Championships appearances
- 2007; 2009–2011; 2013; 2015; 2017; 2019; 2022; 2023; 2024

Sierra Leone competed at the 2019 World Aquatics Championships in Gwangju, South Korea from 12 to 28 July.

== Swimming ==
Sierra Leone entered three swimmers.

Men

| Athlete | Event | Heat | | Semifinal | | Final | |
| Athlete | Event | Time | Rank | Time | Rank | Time | Rank |
|---|---|---|---|---|---|---|---|
| Alie Kamara | 50 m backstroke | 34.66 | 70 | did not advance | | | |
| Alie Kamara | 50 m breaststroke | 37.79 | 75 | did not advance | | | |
| Joshua Wyse | 50 m freestyle | 27.17 | 114 | did not advance | | | |
| Joshua Wyse | 50 m butterfly | 29.85 | 86 | did not advance | | | |

Women

| Athlete | Event | Heat | | Semifinal | | Final | |
| Athlete | Event | Time | Rank | Time | Rank | Time | Rank |
|---|---|---|---|---|---|---|---|
| Tity Dumbuya | 50 m freestyle | 34.85 | 97 | did not advance | | | |
| Tity Dumbuya | 50 m butterfly | 37.90 | 64 | did not advance | | | |
