= Sierra Leone at the 2024 World Aquatics Championships =

- Flag of Sierra Leone
- FINA code: SLE
- National federation: Sierra Leone Amateur Swimming, Diving and Water Polo Association

in Doha, Qatar
- Competitors: 2 in 1 sport
- Medals: Gold 0 Silver 0 Bronze 0 Total 0

World Aquatics Championships appearances
- 2007; 2009–2011; 2013; 2015; 2017; 2019; 2022; 2023; 2024

Sierra Leone competed at the 2024 World Aquatics Championships in Doha, Qatar from 2 to 18 February.

== Competitors ==
The following is the list of competitors in the Championships.

Sport	Men	Women	Total
Swimming	1	1	2
Total	1	1	2

== Swimming ==
Sierra Leone entered 2 swimmers.

Men

Athlete	Event	Heat		Semifinal		Final	
Athlete	Event	Time	Rank	Time	Rank	Time	Rank
Joshua Wyse	50 metre freestyle	27.37	101	Did not advance			
Joshua Wyse	50 metre butterfly	28.69	57	Did not advance			

Women

Athlete	Event	Heat		Semifinal		Final	
Athlete	Event	Time	Rank	Time	Rank	Time	Rank
Olamide Sam	50 metre freestyle	45.51	107	Did not advance			
Olamide Sam	50 metre breaststroke	1:04.78	41	Did not advance			
