= Sierra Leonean leone =

Currency of Sierra Leone

leone
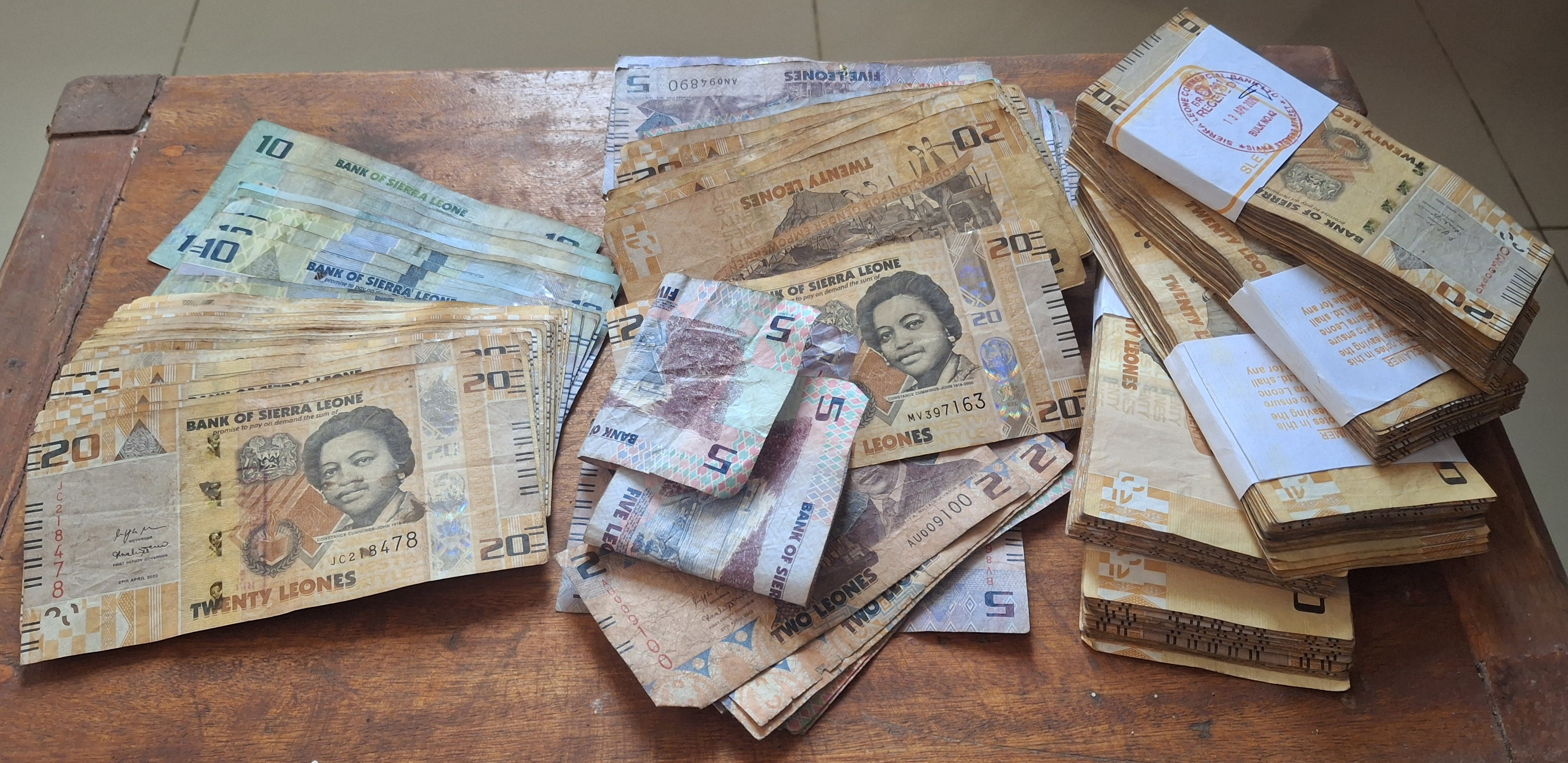
- Pile of SLE banknotes

ISO 4217
- Code: SLE (numeric: 925)
- Subunit: 0.01

Units of account
- Symbol: Le
- Subunit
- 1/100: cent

Denominations
- Banknotes: Le 1, Le 2, Le 5, Le 10, Le 20
- Coins
- Rarely used: 1¢, 5¢, 10¢, 25¢, 50¢

Demographics
- Date of introduction: 1 July 2022
- User(s): Sierra Leone

Issuance
- Central bank: Bank of Sierra Leone
- Website: www.bsl.gov.sl

The leone is the currency of Sierra Leone. It is subdivided into 100 cents. As of 1 July 2022, the ISO 4217 code is SLE due to a redenomination of the old leone (SLL) at a rate of SLL 1000 to SLE 1. The leone is abbreviated as Le placed before the amount.

== First leone (SLL) ==
=== History ===
The first leone was introduced on 4 August 1964. It replaced the British West African pound at a rate of 1 pound = 2 leones (i.e., 1 leone = 10 shillings).

In August 2021, it was announced that a new leone (SLE), worth 1000 SLL, would be introduced. The new leone was introduced in July 2022. Old leones were legal tender until 1 January 2024 and redeemable for current legal tender in commercial banks until 1 April 2024.

=== Coins ===
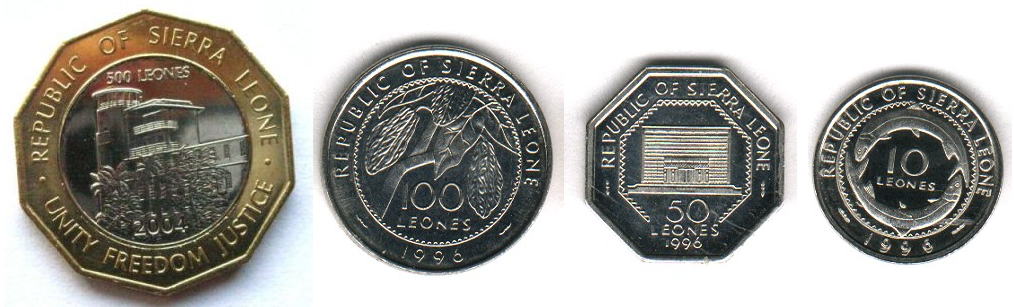
SLL coins.

In 1964, decimal coins were introduced in denominations of 1/2, 1, 5, 10 and 20 cents. The coins size and compositions were based in part on those of the former colonial state British West Africa. All bore the portrait of the first prime minister of Sierra Leone, Sir Milton Margai. In 1972, 50 cents coins were introduced which carried the portrait of the first president Dr. Siaka Stevens.

In 1974, round cupro-nickel one leone coins were introduced and in 1976, seven sided cupro-nickel 2 leone coins commemorating FAO were introduced. These latter two denominations, however, did not circulate as frequently as the lower cent denominations. The portrait of Stevens also appeared on a new, slightly smaller series of coins introduced in 1980 in denominations of 1/2, 1, 5, 10 and 20 cents. In 1987, octagonal, nickel-bronze 1 leone coins were introduced with a bust portrait of General Joseph Saidu Momoh. This coin effectively replaced the one leone note.

Following a period of economic collapse and the following Sierra Leone Civil War inflation became rampant, devaluing older coins. A new coin series was introduced in 1996 for 10, 50 and 100 leones. The 50 leones is octagonal while the other two are round. These coins were struck in nickel-plated steel and feature important figures in Sierra Leone's political history. Ten sided, bimetallic 500 leones coins were first introduced in 2004.

1 leone 1987
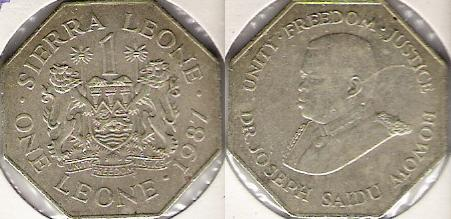
First side of the image: Coat of arms
Second side of the image: Joseph Saidu Momoh

=== Banknotes ===
With the introduction of decimal currency in 1964, a new series of Banknotes was introduced by the Bank of Sierra Leone. Originally called Shillings, the unit name "Leone" was finally decided upon. After considering (and subsequently rejecting) several new designs, including a particularly attractive multi-coloured design, notes were issued in the 1, 2 and 5 Leone denominations. These officially replaced notes of the British West African pound at a two leone to one pound exchange ratio. 50 cents notes were introduced in 1979, followed by 10 leones in 1980 and 20 leones notes in 1982. Throughout this period the value of the currency was fixed and remained relatively stable despite inherent economic problems.

100 leones notes were introduced in 1988, followed by 500 leones in 1991, 1000 and 5000 leones in 1993, 2000 leones in the year 2000 and 10,000 Leone in 2004.

The original series of notes (1964-1974) depicted the famous 300 year old Cottonwood Tree and Court building in central Freetown. The reverses showed Diamond Mining (1 Leone), a Village market scene (2 Leones) and the Dockside in Freetown (5 Leones). Subsequent issues (1974-1991) depicted the head of state during the time of issue. The first series depicting Sir Milton Margai and later issues depicting either Siaka and Momoh. This practice ended with the ascension of the NPRC regime and has remained so despite the return to civilian government.

Prior to June 2010, bank notes in circulation were 500, 1000, 2000, 5000 and 10,000 leones. 10,000 leones notes were in circulation for less than ten years and were infrequently encountered. This meant that most transactions took place in bundles of 5000 leones notes.

In June 2010, the Bank of Sierra Leone issued new notes which were slightly smaller in size than the earlier series and intended to be more secure and durable. The new bank notes are: Le10,000, Le5,000, Le2,000 and Le1,000.

2010 Series									
Image	Value	Dimensions	Main Color	Description		Date of issue	Date of first issue	withdrawal	lapse
Image	Value	Dimensions	Main Color	Obverse	Reverse	Date of issue	Date of first issue	withdrawal	lapse
	1000 leones	135 x 67 mm	Red	Bai Bureh; Coat of arms of Sierra Leone	Telecommunications satellite dish	27 April 2010	14 May 2010	1 January 2024	1 April 2024
	2000 leones	140 x 69 mm	Brown	Isaac Theophilus Akunna Wallace-Johnson, cargo ship; Coat of arms of Sierra Leone	Bank of Sierra Leone building, Freetown	27 April 2010	14 May 2010	1 January 2024	1 April 2024
	5000 leones	145 x 71 mm	Purple	Sengbe Pieh; Coat of arms of Sierra Leone	Bumbuna Dam	27 April 2010	14 May 2010	1 January 2024	1 April 2024
	10,000 leones	153 x 73 mm	Blue and Green	Dove flying over the map of Sierra Leone, Flag of Sierra Leone	White silk-cotton tree; Coat of arms of Sierra Leone	27 April 2010	14 May 2010	1 January 2024	1 April 2024

=== Exchange rates ===
When it was introduced, one leone was worth precisely half a pound sterling or US$1.40. The leone was worth more than the U.S. dollar until the 1980s, when the currency started to devalue rapidly. Years of high inflation have caused the value of leone to plummet, and a U.S. dollar became worth thousands of leones starting in the 2000s.

As of 23 Oct 2018, 20,000 leones were equivalent to about 2.09 EUR. As of 19 April 2021, 20,000 leones were equivalent to about 1.62 EUR.

== Second Leone (SLE) ==
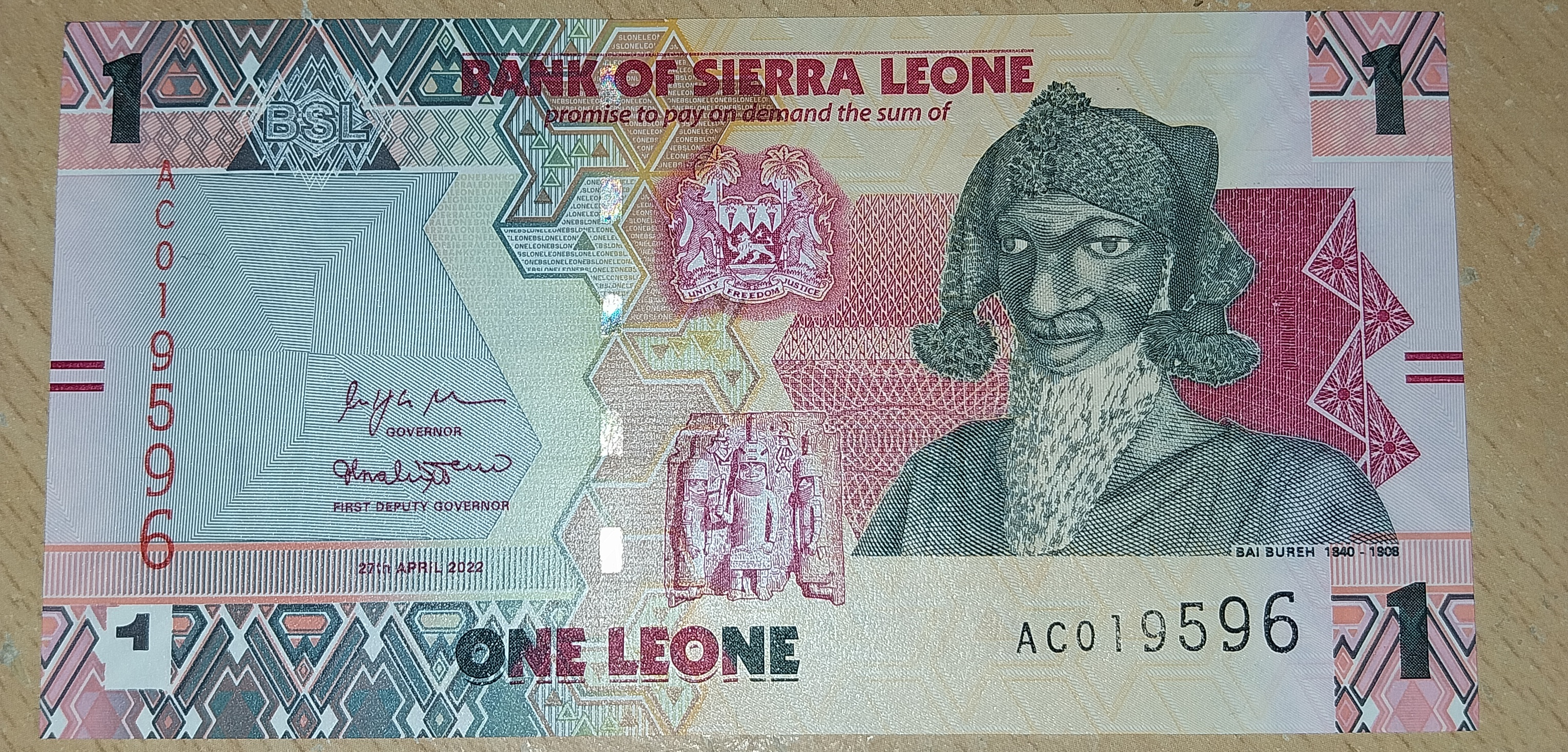
1 leone banknote

=== History ===
In August 2021, it was announced that a new leone (SLE), worth 1,000 SLL, would be introduced.

Banknotes and coins of the SLE entered circulation on 1 July 2022. Old leones were legal tender until 1 January 2024 and redeemable for current legal tender until 1 April 2024.

According to the Bank of Sierra Leone the goal behind this redenomination was the reduction of the amount of banknotes needed to perform transactions. Carrying and counting huge quantities of SLL banknotes was costly and risky. It also made the functioning of ATM’s more difficult. On top of that Sierra Leone experiences a massive currency hoarding between June 2020 and August 2021. The decision to specifically drop 3 zeroes and maintain the designs of most banknotes was made because of the high level of illiteracy in the country.

=== Coins ===
On 1 July 2022 coins were issued in denominations of 1, 5, 10, 25, and 50 cents. Their design featured musicians and musical instruments. Due to their low value these coins however quickly disappeared from circulation. Since at least 2023 coins are virtually unused for payments.

Coins of the SLE
Image	Value	Technical parameters			Description			Date of			
Image	Value	Diameter	Mass	Composition	Edge	Obverse	Reverse	minting	issue	withdrawal	lapse
	1 cent	20 mm	2.8 g	Nickel-plated steel	Smooth	Sullay Abu Bakarr	Microphone	2022	1 July 2022	Current, but no longer used	
	5 cents	22.5 mm	5.0 g	Nickel-plated steel	Smooth	Israel Olorunfeh Cole (Dr. Oloh)	Djembe	2022	1 July 2022	Current, but no longer used	
	10 cents	23 mm	6.0 g	Nickel-plated steel	Smooth	Sooliman Ernest Rogers	Guitar	2022	1 July 2022	Current, but no longer used	
	25 cents	24 mm	5.5g	Brass Plated Steel Core / Nickel Plated Steel Ring	Smooth	Bassie Sorie Kondi	Kalimba	2022	1 July 2022	Current, but no longer used	
	50 cents	26 mm	7.0 g	Nickel Plated Steel Core / Brass Plated Steel Ring	Smooth	Salia Koroma	Accordion	2022	1 July 2022	Current, but no longer used	
These images are to scale at 2.5 pixels per millimetre. For table standards, see the coin specification table.

=== Banknotes ===
Banknotes in the values of 1, 2, 5, 10, and 20 leones were introduced on 1 July 2022. The design of the 1, 2, 5 and 10 leone notes was identical to the 1,000-10,000 notes of the 2010 series. The 20 leones was a new design. The banknotes were printed by De La Rue in the United Kingdom.

Banknotes of the SLE
Image		Value	Dimensions	Description			Date of			
Obverse	Reverse	Value	Dimensions	Obverse	Reverse	Watermark	printing	issue	withdrawal	lapse
		1 leone	120 × 62 mm	Bai Bureh; Benin Bronzes	Telecommunications satellite dish	Lion head, value	27 April 2022	1 July 2022	Current	
		2 leones	125 × 64 mm	Isaac Theophilus Akunna Wallace-Johnson, cargo ship	Bank of Sierra Leone building, Freetown	Lion head, value	27 April 2022	1 July 2022	Current	
		5 leones	130 × 66 mm	Sengbe Pieh; old Fourah Bay College building	Bumbuna Dam	Lion head, value	27 April 2022	1 July 2022	Current	
		10 leones	135 × 68 mm	Dove flying over the map of Sierra Leone, Flag of Sierra Leone	White silk-cotton tree	Lion head, value	27 April 2022	1 July 2022	Current	
		20 leones	140 × 70 mm	Constance Cummings-John; laurels flanking open book with flame	16 schoolgirls in a classroom and map of Sierra Leone	Lion head, value	27 April 2022	1 July 2022	Current	
These images are to scale at 0.7 pixel per millimetre (18 pixel per inch). For table standards, see the banknote specification table.

=== Exchange rates ===
Current SLE exchange rates
From Google Finance:	AUD CAD CHF CNY EUR GBP HKD JPY USD JPY USD
From Yahoo! Finance:	AUD CAD CHF CNY EUR GBP HKD JPY USD JPY USD
From XE.com:	AUD CAD CHF CNY EUR GBP HKD JPY USD JPY USD
From OANDA:	AUD CAD CHF CNY EUR GBP HKD JPY USD JPY USD

== See also ==
- Economy of Sierra Leone
