= Sierra Leone at the 2015 World Aquatics Championships =

- Flag of Sierra Leone
- World Aquatics code: SLE
- National federation: Sierra Leone Amateur Swimming, Diving, & Water Polo Association

in Kazan, Russia
- Competitors: 3 in 1 sport
- Medals: Gold 0 Silver 0 Bronze 0 Total 0

World Aquatics Championships appearances
- 2007; 2009–2011; 2013; 2015; 2017; 2019; 2022; 2023; 2024; 2025

Sierra Leone competed at the 2015 World Aquatics Championships in Kazan, Russia from 24 July to 9 August 2015.

== Swimming ==
Sierra Leone swimmers have achieved qualifying standards in the following events (up to a maximum of two swimmers in each event at the A-standard entry time, and 1 at the B-standard):

Men

Athlete	Event	Heat		Semifinal		Final	
Athlete	Event	Time	Rank	Time	Rank	Time	Rank
Moris Beale	50 m backstroke	35.85	68	did not advance			
Moris Beale	50 m breaststroke	34.87	68	did not advance			
Osman Kamara	50 m freestyle	27.70	103	did not advance			
Osman Kamara	50 m butterfly	35.21	79	did not advance			

Women

Athlete	Event	Heat		Semifinal		Final	
Athlete	Event	Time	Rank	Time	Rank	Time	Rank
Bunturabie Jalloh	50 m freestyle	54.27	113	did not advance			
Bunturabie Jalloh	50 m breaststroke	57.64	73	did not advance			
