= List of Sierra Leonean records in swimming =

The Sierra Leonan records in swimming are the fastest ever performances of swimmers from Sierra Leone, which are recognised and ratified by the Sierra Leone Amateur Swimming, Diving and Water Polo Association.

All records were set in finals unless noted otherwise.

== Long Course (50 m) ==
=== Men ===
Event	Time		Name	Club	Date	Meet	Location	Ref
50 m freestyle	26.90	h	Osman Kamara	Sierra Leone	11 August 2016	Olympic Games	Rio de Janeiro, Brazil	
100 m freestyle								
200 m freestyle								
400 m freestyle								
800 m freestyle								
1500 m freestyle								
50 m backstroke	35.85	h	Moris Beale	Sierra Leone	8 August 2015	World Championships	Kazan, Russia	
100 m backstroke								
200 m backstroke								
50 m breaststroke	35.13	h	Moris Beale	Sierra Leone	25 July 2017	World Championships	Budapest, Hungary	
100 m breaststroke								
200 m breaststroke	3:02.89	h	Moris Beals	Sierra Leone	9 September 2015	African Games	Brazzaville, Congo	
50 m butterfly	28.68	h	Joshua Wyse	Sierra Leone	30 April 2024	African Championships	Luanda, Angola	
100 m butterfly								
200 m butterfly								
200 m individual medley	2:58.48	h	Moses Yongai	Sierra Leone	13 March 2024	African Games	Accra, Ghana	
400 m individual medley								
4×100 m freestyle relay								
4×200 m freestyle relay								
4×100 m medley relay								

Legend: # – Record awaiting ratification by Sierra Leone Amateur Swimming, Diving and Water Polo Association; WR – World record; AF – African record;
Records not set in finals: h – heat; sf – semifinal; r – relay 1st leg; rh – relay heat 1st leg; b – B final; † – en route to final mark; so – swim-off; tt – time trial

=== Women ===
Event	Time		Name	Club	Date	Meet	Location	Ref
50 m freestyle	26.01	h	Halle Harris	Sierra Leone	28 July 2026	Commonwealth Games	Glasgow, United Kingdom	
100 m freestyle	58.16	h	Halle Harris	Poole	15 March 2026	Edinburgh International	Edinburgh, United Kingdom	
200 m freestyle								
400 m freestyle								
800 m freestyle								
1500 m freestyle								
50 m backstroke	29.01	sf	Halle Harris	Sierra Leone	27 July 2026	Commonwealth Games	Glasgow, United Kingdom	
100 m backstroke	1:04.13	h	Halle Harris	Sierra Leone	25 July 2026	Commonwealth Games	Glasgow, United Kingdom	
200 m backstroke								
50 m breaststroke	47.24	h	Isha Kanu	Sierra Leone	21 August 2019	African Games	Casablanca, Morocco	
100 m breaststroke								
200 m breaststroke								
50 m butterfly	27.90	h	Halle Harris	Poole	15 March 2026	Edinburgh International	Edinburgh, United Kingdom	
100 m butterfly								
200 m butterfly								
200 m individual medley								
400 m individual medley								
4×100 m freestyle relay								
4×200 m freestyle relay								
4×100 m medley relay								

Legend: # – Record awaiting ratification by Sierra Leone Amateur Swimming, Diving and Water Polo Association; WR – World record; AF – African record;
Records not set in finals: h – heat; sf – semifinal; r – relay 1st leg; rh – relay heat 1st leg; b – B final; † – en route to final mark; so – swim-off; tt – time trial

== Short Course (25 m) ==
=== Men ===
Event	Time		Name	Club	Date	Meet	Location	Ref
50 m freestyle	27.12	h	Joshua Wyse	Sierra Leone	18 December 2021	World Championships	Abu Dhabi, United Arab Emirates	
100 m freestyle	1:07.84	h	Kamara Osman	Sierra Leone	15 December 2012	World Championships	Istanbul, Turkey	
200 m freestyle								
400 m freestyle								
800 m freestyle								
1500 m freestyle								
50m backstroke	36.41	h	Alie Kamara	Sierra Leone	13 December 2018	World Championships	Hangzhou, China	
100 m backstroke								
200 m backstroke								
50m breaststroke	36.76	h	Alie Kamara	Sierra Leone	15 December 2018	World Championships	Hangzhou, China	
100 m breaststroke								
200 m breaststroke								
50m butterfly	31.59	h	Joshua Wyse	Sierra Leone	14 December 2018	World Championships	Hangzhou, China	
100 m butterfly								
200 m butterfly								
100 m individual medley								
200 m individual medley								
400 m individual medley								
4×50 m freestyle relay								
4×100 m freestyle relay								
4×200 m freestyle relay								
4×50 m medley relay								
4×100 m medley relay								

Legend: # – Record awaiting ratification by Sierra Leone Amateur Swimming, Diving and Water Polo Association; WR – World record; AF – African record;
Records not set in finals: h – heat; sf – semifinal; r – relay 1st leg; rh – relay heat 1st leg; b – B final; † – en route to final mark; so – swim-off; tt – time trial

=== Women ===
Event	Time		Name	Club	Date	Meet	Location	Ref
50m freestyle	30.50	h	Tity Dumbuya	Sierra Leone	20 December 2021	World Championships	Abu Dhabi, United Arab Emirates	
100 m freestyle								
200 m freestyle								
400 m freestyle								
800 m freestyle								
1500 m freestyle								
50 m backstroke	44.23	h	Kanu Isha	Sierra Leone	19 December 2021	World Championships	Abu Dhabi, United Arab Emirates	
100 m backstroke								
200 m backstroke								
50 m breaststroke	47.89	h	Kanu Isha	Sierra Leone	11 December 2018	World Championships	Hangzhou, China	
100 m breaststroke								
200 m breaststroke								
50 m butterfly	41.18	h	Tity Dumbuya	Sierra Leone	13 December 2018	World Championships	Hangzhou, China	
100 m butterfly								
200 m butterfly								
100 m individual medley								
200 m individual medley								
400 m individual medley								
4×50 m freestyle relay								
4×100 m freestyle relay								
4×200 m freestyle relay								
4×50 m medley relay								
4×100 m medley relay								

Legend: # – Record awaiting ratification by Sierra Leone Amateur Swimming, Diving and Water Polo Association; WR – World record; AF – African record;
Records not set in finals: h – heat; sf – semifinal; r – relay 1st leg; rh – relay heat 1st leg; b – B final; † – en route to final mark; so – swim-off; tt – time trial
