= Standard of Prince Philip, Duke of Edinburgh =

Banner of arms

Prince Philip, Duke of Edinburgh
- Use: Small vexillological symbol or pictogram in black and white showing the different uses of the flag
- Adopted: 1952
- Relinquished: 2021
- Use: Small vexillological symbol or pictogram in black and white showing the different uses of the flag
- Adopted: 1951
- Relinquished: 1952

The standard of Prince Philip, Duke of Edinburgh, was the personal flag used by Prince Philip, Duke of Edinburgh. It displays his coat of arms and can thus be considered a banner of arms.

== Usage ==
The flag was flown above buildings and on cars to indicate Philip's presence. It was flown except when the Queen was present as well; then the Royal Standard of the United Kingdom was used instead. As he was a Knight of the Order of the Garter, his standard was hung in the form of a banner in St George's Chapel at Windsor Castle until his death in 2021, when it was removed in accordance with the order's tradition. At Philip's funeral in St George's Chapel, his coffin was draped with his standard.

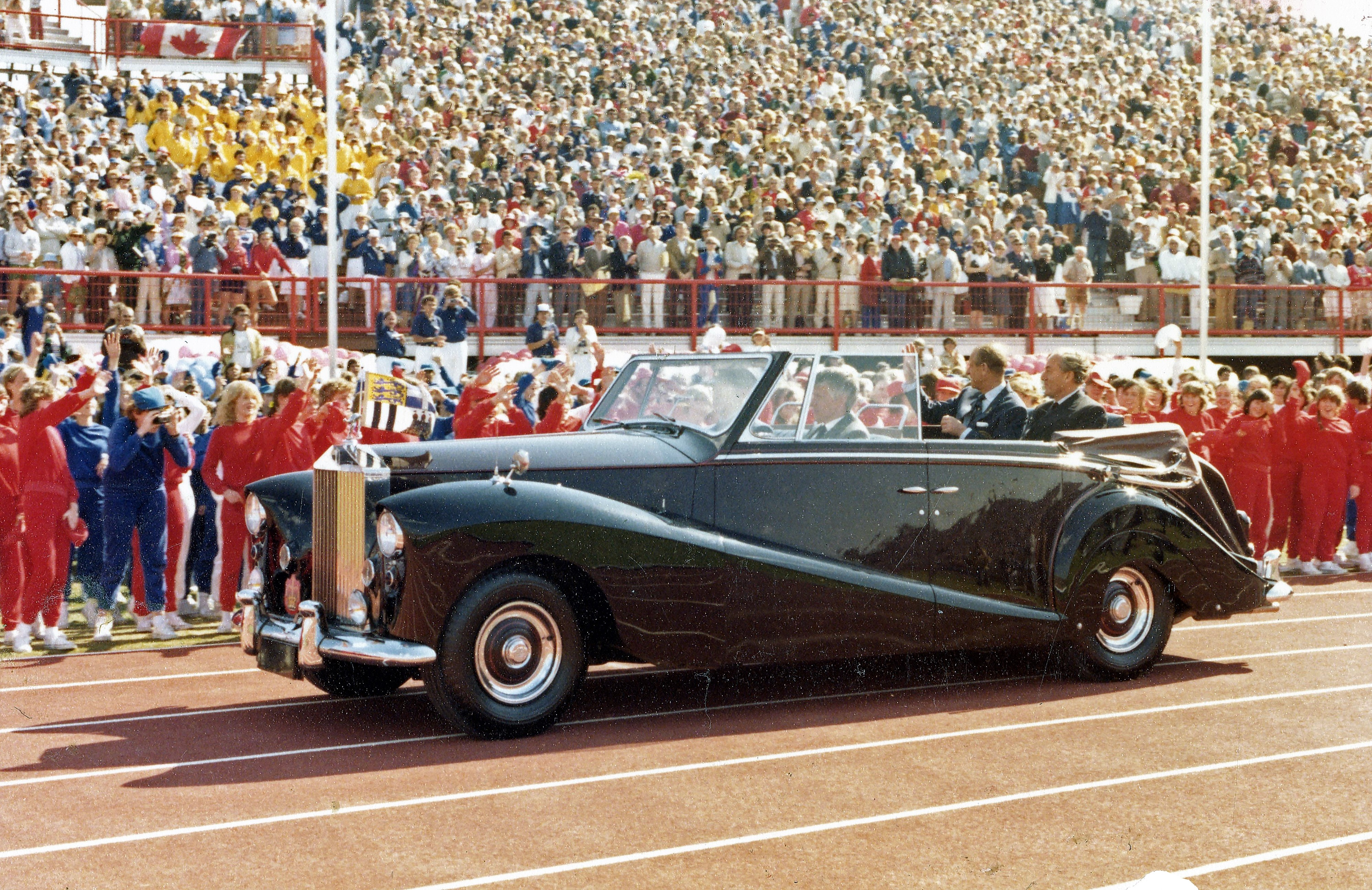
Philip's standard flying on his car in Brisbane, 1982

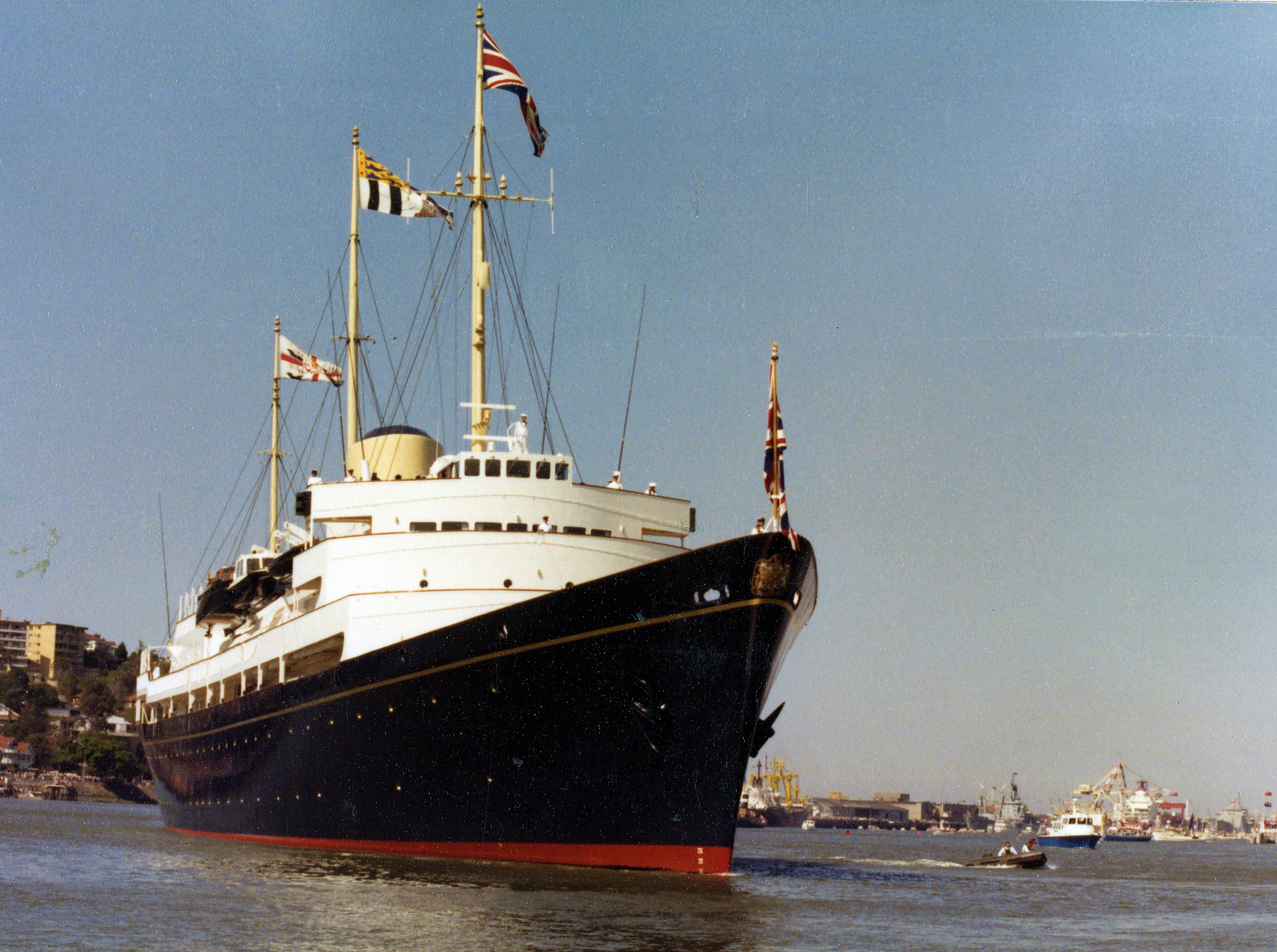
Philip's personal standard flying on the Royal Yacht Britannia, 1982

Philip's banner as Knight of the Garter

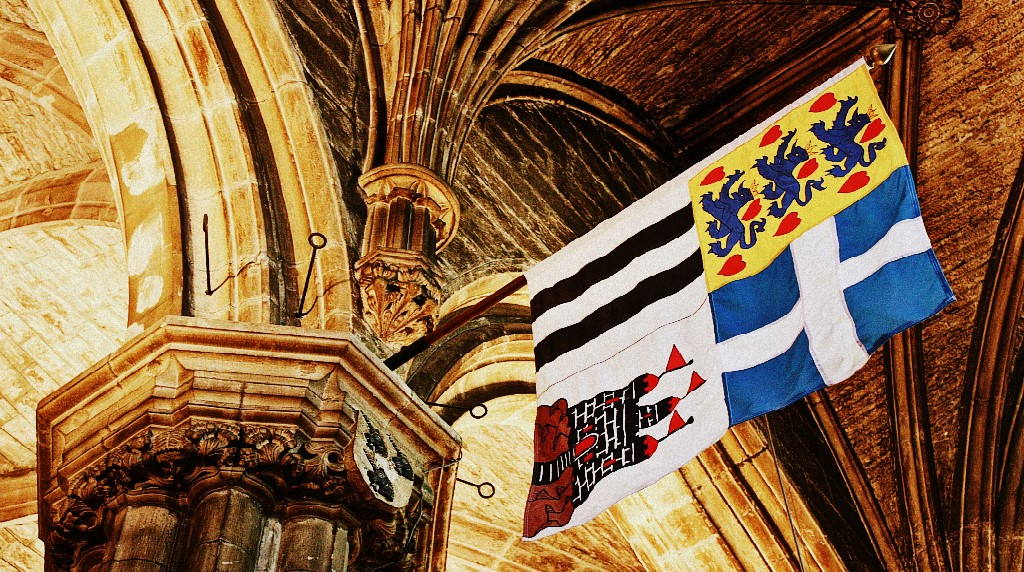
Philip's banner as Knight of the Thistle hanging in St. Giles' Cathedral, Edinburgh

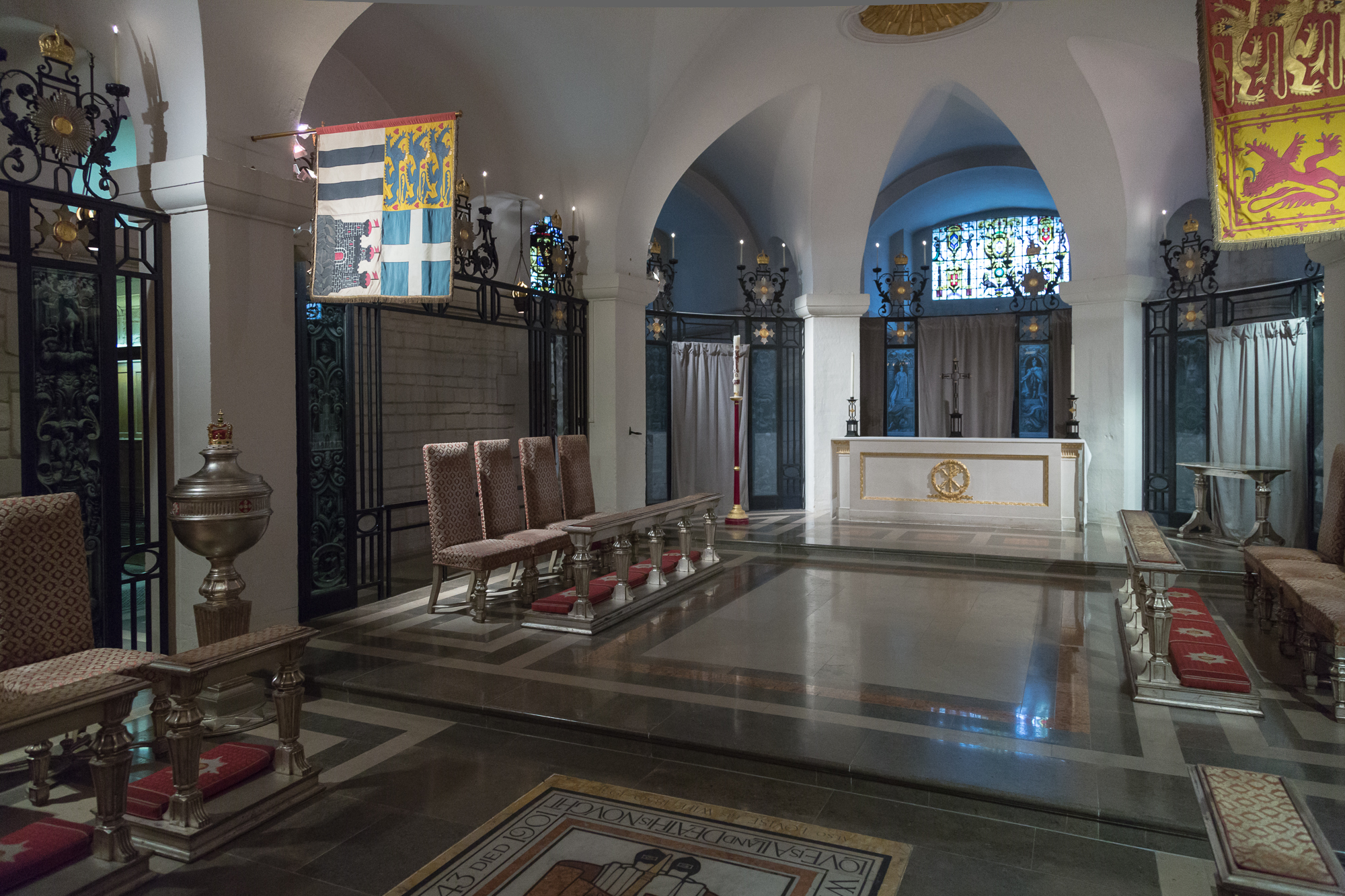
Philip's banner as Grand Master of the Order of the British Empire in the chapel of the Order of the British Empire in the crypt of St Paul's Cathedral

== As a Prince of Greece and Denmark ==
Before his marriage to Princess Elizabeth and his creation as Duke of Edinburgh, Prince Philip was styled Prince Philip of Greece and Denmark and used the standards of the Greek royal family. As a male-line descendant of King George I of Greece, he was entitled to the standard designated for other princes of the royal house.

Both standards featured a white cross on a blue field, symbolizing Greece, with the royal coat of arms of the Greek dynasty at the center. The earlier version, adopted in 1914, was used until the monarchy’s abolition in 1924, while the second, introduced in 1936, remained in use until 1974 when the monarchy was permanently abolished. From his birth in 1921 to the abolition of the monarchy in 1924, he used the standard adopted in 1914. After the restoration of the monarchy in 1935, the 1914 decrees concerning Greek national and royal flags were reinstated by royal decree on 7 November 1935. In 1936, the Greek royal family adopted a new royal standard. The design was similar to the Greek naval jack, but bore the royal arms of the family in the center and omitted the crown. These were used by Prince Philip until his renunciation of his Greek & Danish titles in 1947.

1914 Version

1936 version

== As Consort to The Princess Elizabeth ==
In November 1951, King George VI authorised Philip to use a personal standard consisting of his arms impaled with the arms of his wife, Princess Elizabeth. He did so until Elizabeth ascended to the throne as queen in 1952, after which his standard bore his arms alone.

1951 version

== As Consort to the British Monarch ==
Philip's standard after 1952 was divided into quarters, each alluding to a component of his ancestry or title. The top-left quarter featured three blue crowned lions on a yellow background with red hearts, derived from the coat of arms of Denmark, while the top-right quarter was blue with a white cross, representing the coat of arms of Greece and the country's flag at the time. Both of these represented his former status as a prince of Denmark and of Greece. The bottom-left quarter had five vertical black and white stripes, representing the House of Mountbatten, Philip's maternal family, and the bottom-right quarter bore a heraldic representation of Edinburgh Castle, taken from the city's coat of arms, to symbolise his title as Duke of Edinburgh. The whole design was blazoned by the College of Arms as follows:

Quarterly: first or, semée of hearts gules, three lions passant in pale azure ducally crowned or; second azure, a cross argent; third argent, two pallets sable; fourth argent, upon a rock proper a castle triple towered sable masoned argent windows port turret-caps and vanes gules.

1952 version

== See also ==
- Flags of Elizabeth II
- Royal standard of the United Kingdom
- Royal standards of Canada
- Royal standards of Greece
- Flags of Charles III
- Flags at Buckingham Palace
