= Sierra Leone at the 2013 World Aquatics Championships =

- Flag of Sierra Leone
- World Aquatics code: SLE
- National federation: Sierra Leone Amateur Swimming, Diving, & Water Polo Association

in Barcelona, Spain
- Competitors: 2 in 1 sport
- Medals: Gold 0 Silver 0 Bronze 0 Total 0

World Aquatics Championships appearances
- 2007; 2009–2011; 2013; 2015; 2017; 2019; 2022; 2023; 2024; 2025

Sierra Leone competed at the 2013 World Aquatics Championships in Barcelona, Spain from 19 July to 4 August 2013.

== Swimming ==
Sierra Leone swimmers achieved qualifying standards in the following events (up to a maximum of 2 swimmers in each event at the A-standard entry time, and 1 at the B-standard):

Men

Athlete	Event	Heat		Semifinal		Final	
Athlete	Event	Time	Rank	Time	Rank	Time	Rank
Sahr James	50 m backstroke	37.36	51	did not advance			
Sahr James	50 m breaststroke	37.26	78	did not advance			
Osman Kamara	50 m freestyle	28.30	91	did not advance			
Osman Kamara	50 m butterfly	35.66	77	did not advance			
