= Flags of Elizabeth II =

Many of the flags Queen Elizabeth II utilized in the countries of which she was head of state featured the device found in her personal flag, which was somewhat different from her royal cypher.

Elizabeth II had a variety of flags to represent her personally and as head of state of several independent nations around the world. They were usually used on any building, ship, car, or aircraft where she was present.

These heraldic flags were usually a nation's coat of arms in banner form.

== As heir presumptive ==
Princess Elizabeth's personal standard prior to her accession as Queen was her coat of arms in banner form. This consisted of four quarters consisting of three lions passant for England, a lion rampant for Scotland, and a Gaelic harp for Ireland. To differentiate the arms of Princess Elizabeth from that of the King it was differenced with a white label of three points, the centre point bearing a Tudor rose and the first and third a cross of St George. The flag was adopted in 1944 and was used for the first time on 30 November 1944, at the launch of HMS Vanguard (23) by the Princess.

1944–1952

Scottish version

== As sovereign ==
Immediately upon becoming Queen, Elizabeth inherited the two versions of the royal standard of the United Kingdom. Since the 1960s, flags were introduced to represent the Queen in various other Commonwealth realms, which followed the same basic pattern: the nation's coat of arms in banner form with the device found on her personal flag. The Queen's representatives in these nations had their own flags to represent them.

=== United Kingdom ===
Upon the death of her father, Princess Elizabeth became Queen Elizabeth II and therefore adopted the Royal Standard. This flag was used to represent the Queen not only in the United Kingdom but also overseas when she made state visits (at least to non-Commonwealth realms). It is the royal arms in banner form undifferentiated.

Outside Scotland

Scotland

=== Sierra Leone ===
The standard of Elizabeth II, Queen of Sierra Leone

The Queen's Sierra Leonean standard was created when she visited Sierra Leone in 1961, in her capacity as Queen of Sierra Leone. The flag featured the coat of arms of Sierra Leone in banner form, which depicts a lion beneath a zigzag border, representing the Lion Mountains, after which the country was named. It also had three red torches which symbolized peace and dignity. At the base were wavy bars depicting the sea. A blue disc of the crowned letter "E", surrounded by a garland of gold roses defaced the flag, which is taken from the Queen's Personal Flag. The Sierra Leonean standard also served as the inspiration for the design and layout of her personal standard for Canada.

This flag ceased to be used when Sierra Leone became a republic in 1971.

=== Canada ===
The standard of Elizabeth II, Queen of Canada

The Queen had a personal Canadian Flag in her role as Queen of Canada. The flag was adopted and proclaimed by her on 15 August 1962. The flag, in a 1:2 proportion, consists of the escutcheon of the Royal Coat of Arms of Canada in banner form defaced with the distinct device of Queen Elizabeth II: a blue roundel with the initial E surmounted by St Edward's Crown and within a wreath of roses, all gold-coloured.

The standard is protected under the Trade-marks Act; section 9(a) states: "No person shall adopt in connection with a business, as a trade-mark or otherwise, any mark consisting of, or so nearly resembling as to be likely to be mistaken for... the Royal Arms, Crest or Standard".

The Queen's Canadian Standard was also flown sometimes in her absence. To mark the Queen's sixty years on the Canadian throne on 6 February 2012, her personal Canadian standard was unfurled at Rideau Hall and on Parliament Hill, as well as at provincial royal residences and legislatures across the country.

=== Australia ===
The standard of Elizabeth II, Queen of Australia

The Queen had a personal Australian Flag in her role as Queen of Australia. The flag was approved for use in by the Queen on 20 September 1962, and first used during the 1963 royal visit. The flag consists of a banner of the coat of arms of Australia, defaced with a gold seven-pointed federation star with a blue disc containing the letter E below a crown, surrounded by a garland of golden roses. Each of the six sections of the flag represents the heraldic badge of the Australian states, and the whole is surrounded by an ermine border representing the federation of the states.

The flag is flown on Royal Australian Navy ships, or on Australian official buildings or in enclosures only on occasions when the monarch is present. The exception to this rule is parades in honour of their birthday, when the flag is flown even if the monarch is not present. When it is flown on or outside a building, no other flag is flown with it.

On 7 July 2000, to celebrate the 100th anniversary of the passage of the Commonwealth of Australia Constitution Act 1900 by the British Parliament, the Queen attended a church service at Westminster Abbey in London. The Queen's personal flag for Australia flew at the Abbey, the first time it had flown in the United Kingdom.

=== New Zealand ===
The standard of Elizabeth II, Queen of New Zealand

The Queen had a personal flag in her role as Queen of New Zealand. It was approved for use in 1962. It was flown by the Queen when in New Zealand. The only time the flag was flown in New Zealand in the absence of the Queen, was at parades held on and in honour of her official birthday. The flag is the escutcheon of the arms of New Zealand in banner form, defaced with a blue roundel surrounded by a garland of roses encircling a crowned letter 'E', all in gold.

The flag is divided into four quadrants: The first quadrant includes depicts four stars as representative of the Southern Cross constellation, as depicted on the national flag. The second quadrant consists of a golden fleece on a red field. The third quadrant contains a golden wheat sheaf on a red field. The final quadrant includes two crossed gold hammers on a blue field. The central stripe consists of three ships. Superimposed in the centre is a dark blue roundel bearing a Roman E surmounted by a Royal Crown within a chaplet of roses, all gold-coloured (the roundel completely obscures the central ship).

The flag takes precedence over the New Zealand flag, and is protected under the Flags, Emblems, and Names Protection Act 1981; Section 12(1) states: "Every person commits an offence against this Act who, without the authority of Her Majesty or (as the case may require) the Governor-General, displays or exhibits or otherwise uses any representation to which this subsection applies in such a manner as to be likely to cause any person to believe that he does so under the authority, sanction, approval, appointment, or patronage of Her Majesty or the Governor-General".

An example of the Queen's New Zealand Standard being used outside New Zealand, is at the unveiling of the New Zealand War Memorial in London, UK, by the Queen at Hyde Park in 2006. The Queen's Personal New Zealand Standard was flown, along with the Union Flag, and the flag of New Zealand on three separate freestanding flagpoles at the ceremony.

=== Trinidad and Tobago ===
The standard of Elizabeth II, Queen of Trinidad and Tobago

The Queen's personal flag for Trinidad and Tobago was used for the first time when she visited Trinidad and Tobago in 1966. The flag featured the coat of arms of Trinidad and Tobago in banner form, which depicts the colours of the national flag. The gold ships represent the three ships Christopher Columbus used on his voyage. The two birds above are hummingbirds. A blue disc of the crowned letter "E", surrounded by a garland of gold roses defaced the flag (obscuring most of the centre ship), is taken from the Queen's Personal Flag.

This flag ceased to be used when Trinidad and Tobago became a republic in 1976.

=== Jamaica ===
The standard of Elizabeth II, Queen of Jamaica

The Queen had a personal flag in her role as Queen of Jamaica. It was first used when she visited Jamaica in 1966, as part of her Caribbean tour. The flag consists of a banner of the coat of arms of Jamaica defaced with the Queen's Royal Cypher. The flag is white and bears a red St George's Cross. A gold pineapple is superimposed on each arm of the Cross. A blue disc with the Queen's initial is placed in the centre of the Cross (obscuring the central pineapple). The disc is taken from the Queen's Personal Flag.

=== Malta ===
The standard of Elizabeth II, Queen of Malta

The Queen had a personal flag for use in Malta, in her role as Queen of Malta. The flag was adopted on 31 October 1967, and first used when the Queen visited Malta in 1967. The flag consisted of the coat of arms of Malta in banner form, which depicts the colours white and red, and a representation of the George Cross, awarded to Malta by George VI in 1942. A blue disc of the crowned letter "E", surrounded by a garland of gold roses defaced the flag, which is taken from the Queen's Personal Flag.

This flag ceased to be used when Malta became a republic in 1974.

=== Mauritius ===
The standard of Elizabeth II, Queen of Mauritius

The Queen's personal flag for Mauritius was first used when she visited Mauritius in March 1972. The flag consisted of the coat of arms of Mauritius in banner form: quarterly azure and or, in the first quarter a lymphad of the last in the second, 3 palm trees eradicated vert, in the third, a key in pale the wards downwards gules, and in the issuant, from the base a pile, and in chief a mullet argent. A blue disc of the crowned letter "E", surrounded by a garland of gold roses defaced the flag, which is taken from the Queen's Personal Flag.

This flag ceased to be used when Mauritius became a republic in 1992.

=== Barbados ===
The standard of Elizabeth II, Queen of Barbados

The Queen had a personal flag for use in Barbados, in her role as Queen of Barbados. It was first used when the Queen visited Barbados in 1975. The standard consisted of a yellow field with a bearded fig tree, a long-established symbol of the island of Barbados, and the national flower the Pride of Barbados flowers in each of the upper corners. A blue disc of the crowned letter "E", surrounded by a garland of gold roses, was displayed prominently on the flag within the centre of the tree.

This flag ceased to be used when Barbados became a republic in 2021.

== Personal flag ==
Personal flag of Queen Elizabeth II

The Queen's personal flag was displayed on any building, ship, car, or aircraft in which she stayed or travelled. It often represented the Queen in her role as Head of the Commonwealth or as monarch of a Commonwealth realm in which she did not possess a unique flag.

This flag, designed by the College of Arms in 1960, bears the crowned letter E in gold, surrounded by a garland of gold roses on a blue background, with a golden fringe. The crown is a symbol of the Queen's rank and dignity, whilst the chaplet roses symbolise all the countries of the Commonwealth.

The flag was created at the Queen's request in December 1960 to symbolise her as an individual, not associated with her role as sovereign of any particular Commonwealth realm. It was designed as an alternative to the Royal Standard, for use chiefly in Commonwealth republics where the British heraldic devices have no historic significance, and at meetings of leaders of the Commonwealth, where the Royal Standard would be considered inappropriate as it represents only the UK.

It was first used in 1961 for the Queen's visit to India. It was flown for the first time on the Bristol Britannia in which the Queen landed at Delhi Airport.

Over time, the flag started to be used in place of the British royal standard when the Queen visited Commonwealth countries where she was not head of state, Commonwealth realms where she had no specific standard, and for Commonwealth occasions in the United Kingdom; it came to symbolise the Queen as Head of the Commonwealth. Eventually, the practice evolved whereby the flag was raised at Marlborough House (the headquarters of the Commonwealth Secretariat) in London whenever the Queen visited, rather than the Royal Standard of the UK.

== Others ==
=== As Lord High Admiral ===
Flag as Lord High Admiral of the United Kingdom

In 1964, the Queen assumed the office of the Lord High Admiral of the United Kingdom. In this capacity, the Queen flew a special Lord High Admiral's flag. It was flown when the Queen was at sea, and at naval establishments ashore on official occasions, when it flew alongside the Royal Standard.

== Gallery ==
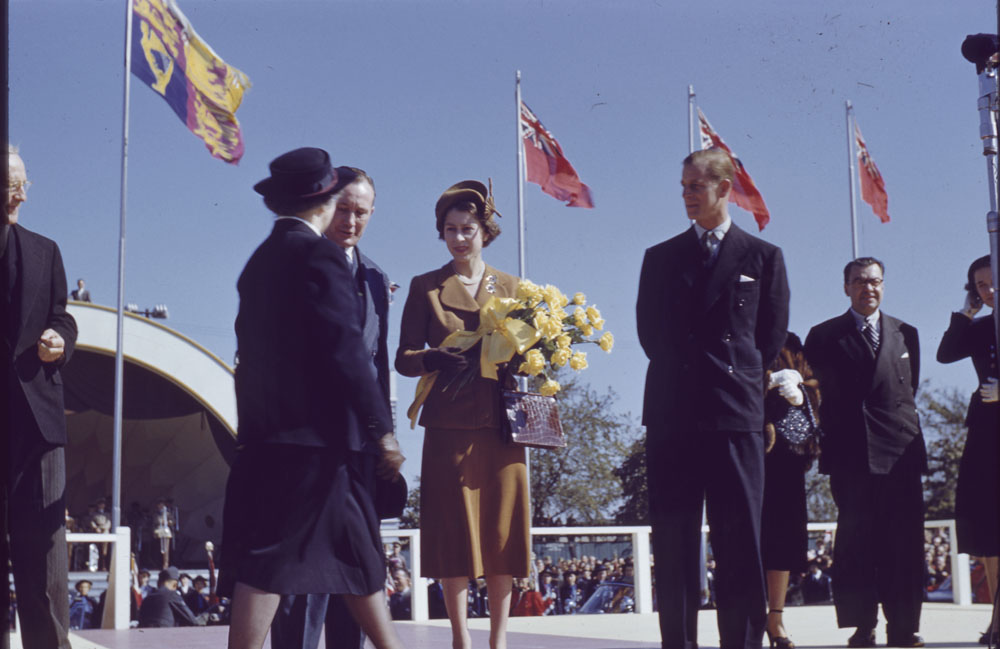
Princess Elizabeth's standard flying in the background, during her 1951 royal tour of Canada

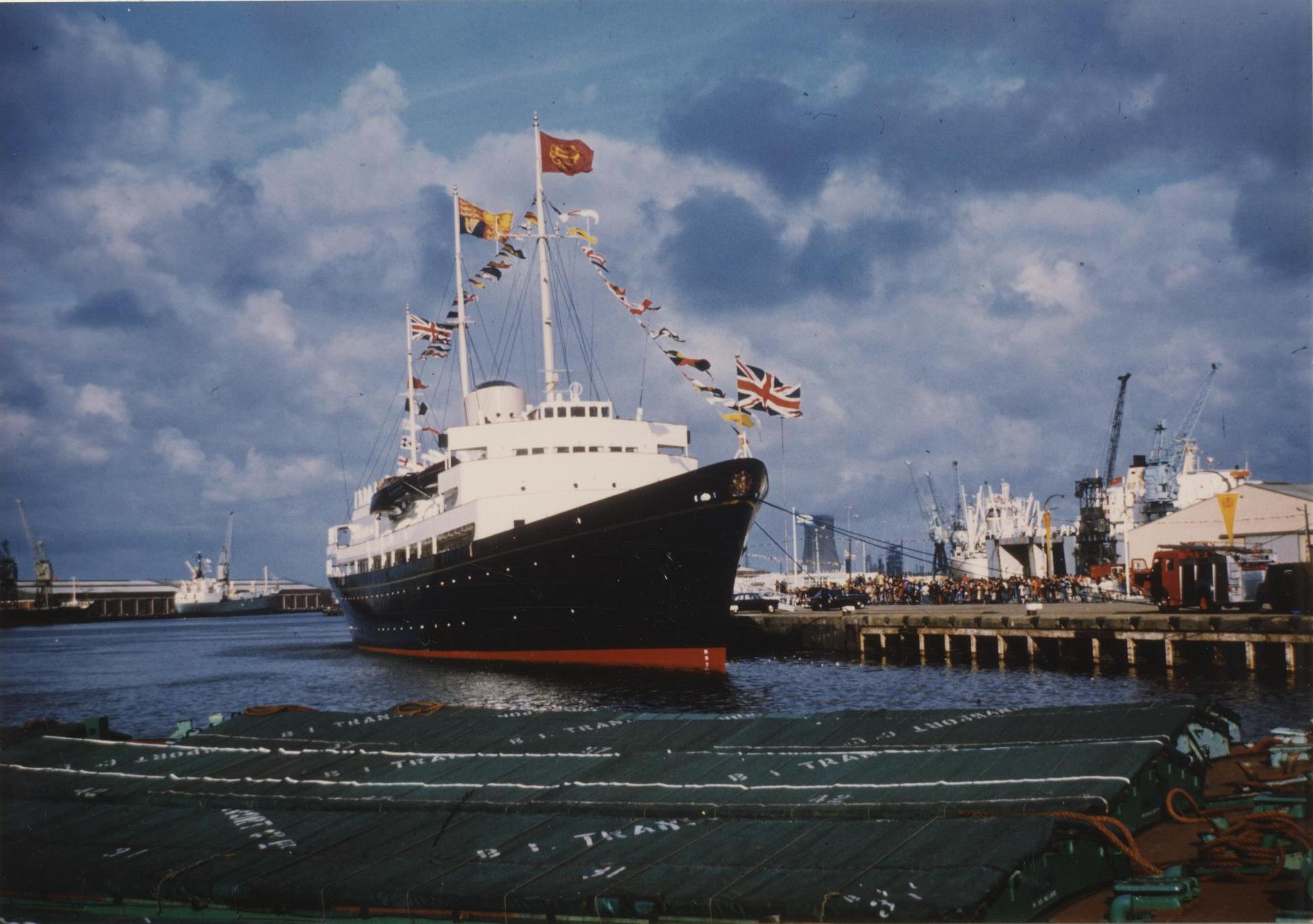
The Royal Yacht Britannia flying the Royal Standard and the Flag of the Lord High Admiral, 1977

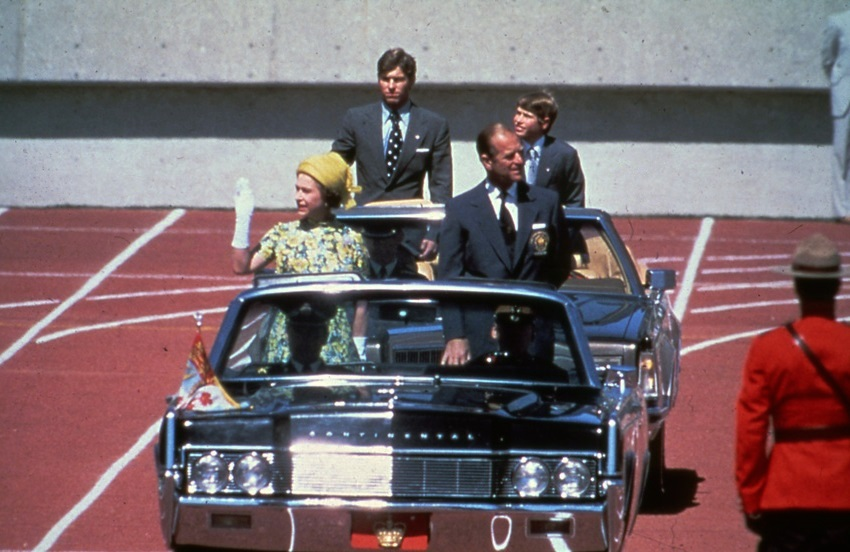
The Queen's Canadian Standard flying on her car, at the opening of the 1978 Commonwealth Games in Edmonton, Alberta

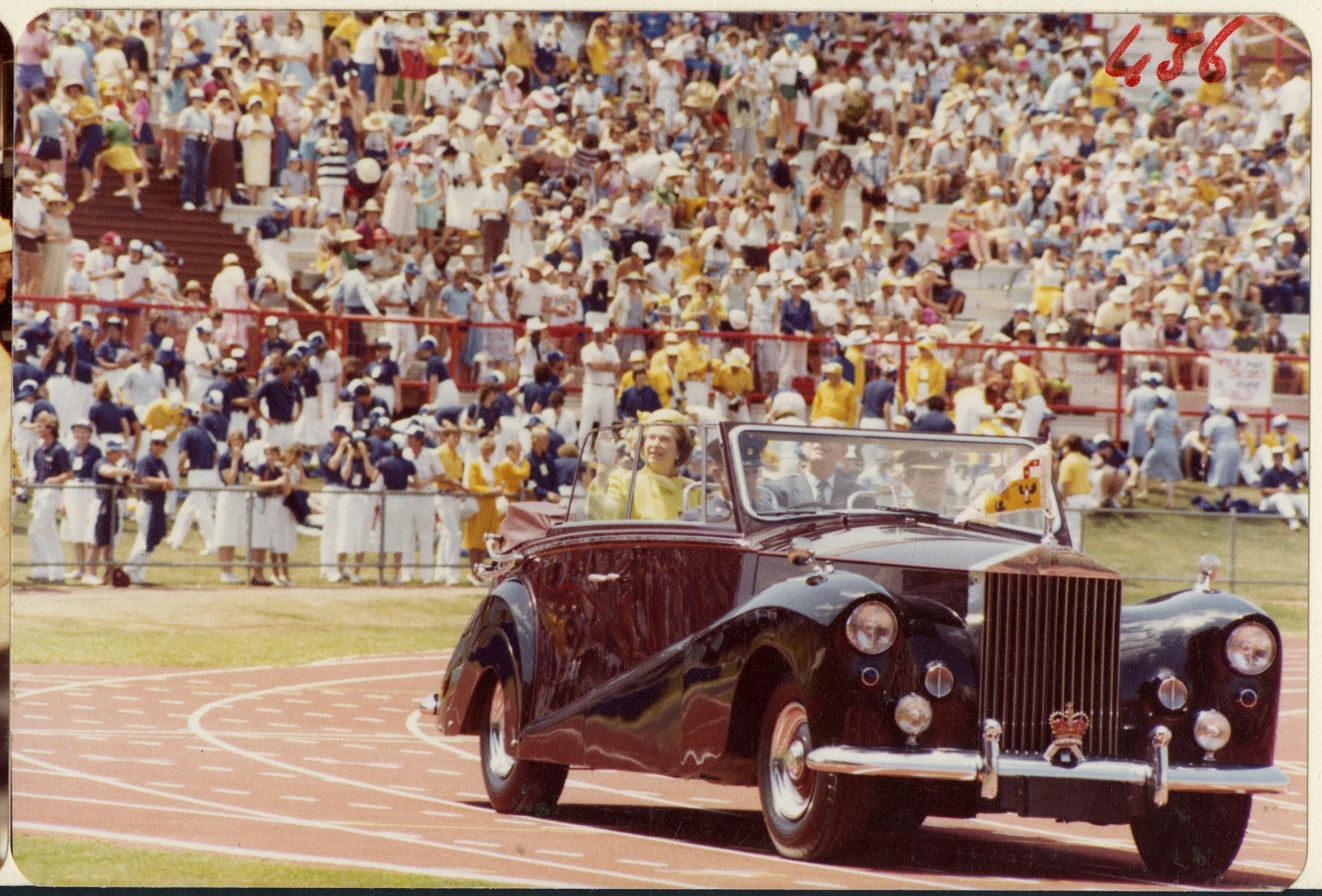
The Queen's Australian Standard being used by her at Brisbane, 1982

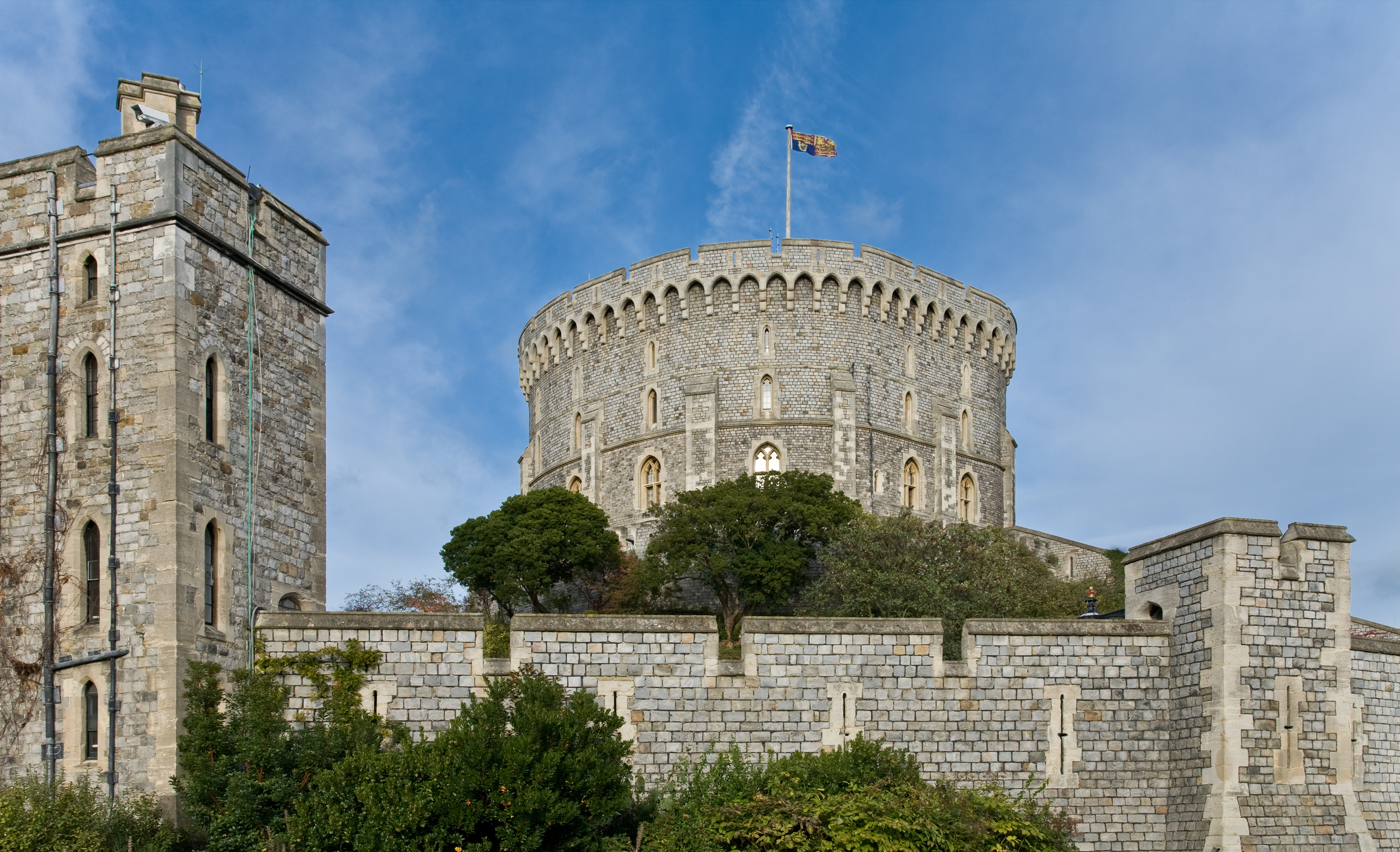
The Royal Standard flying above the Round Tower at Windsor Castle, 2006

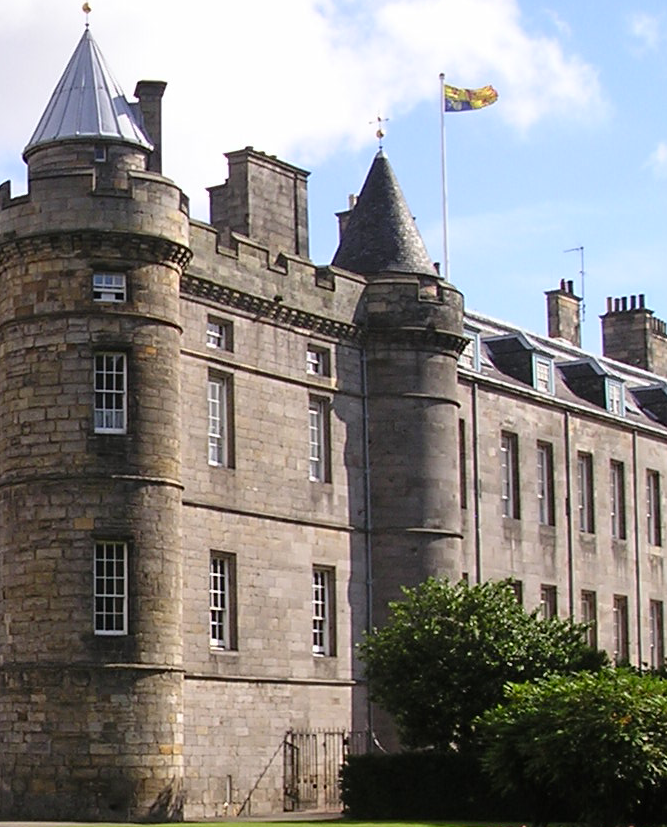
The Scottish Royal Standard flying over Holyrood Palace, 2007

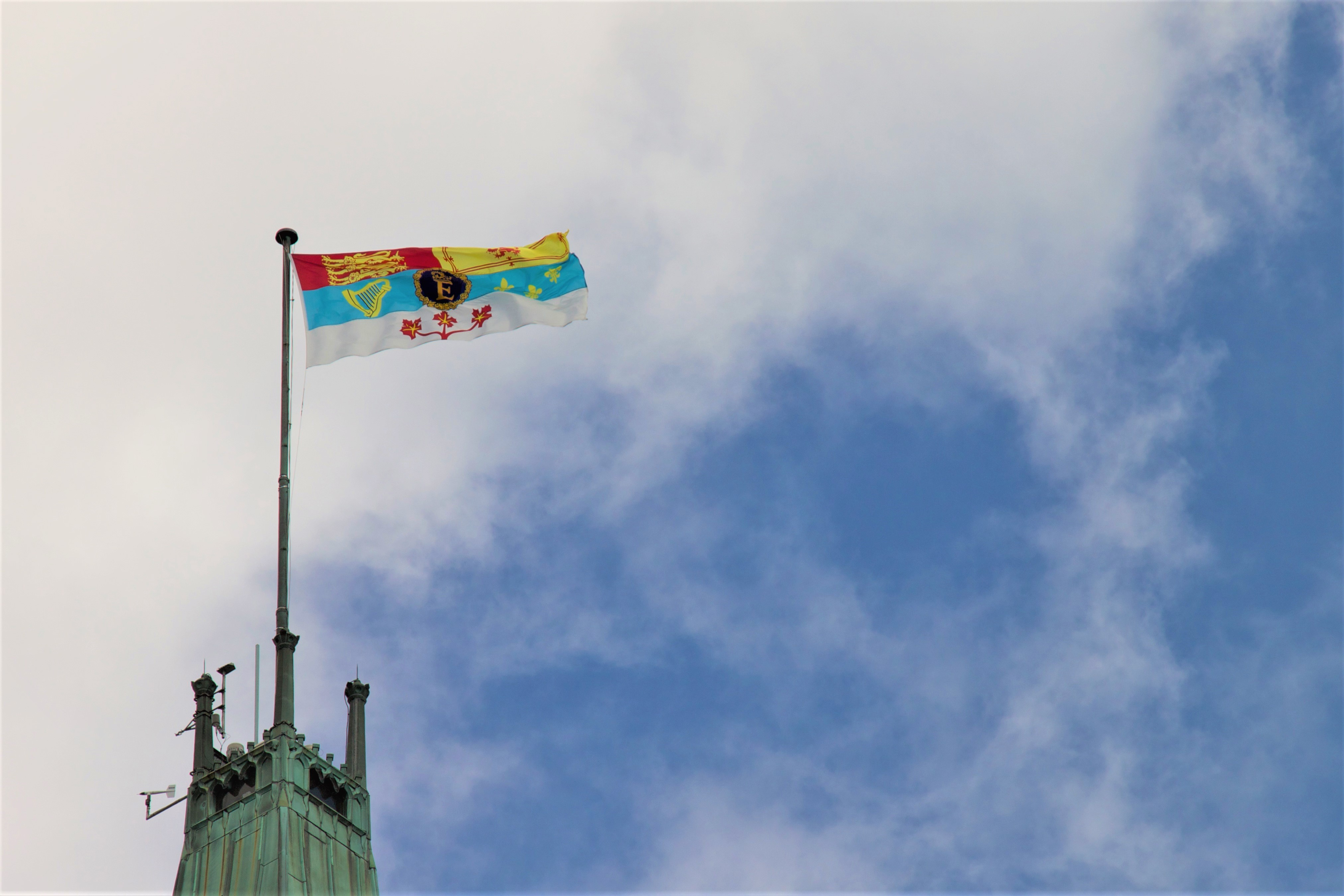
The Queen's Canadian standard flying from the Peace Tower on Parliament Hill, 1 July 2010

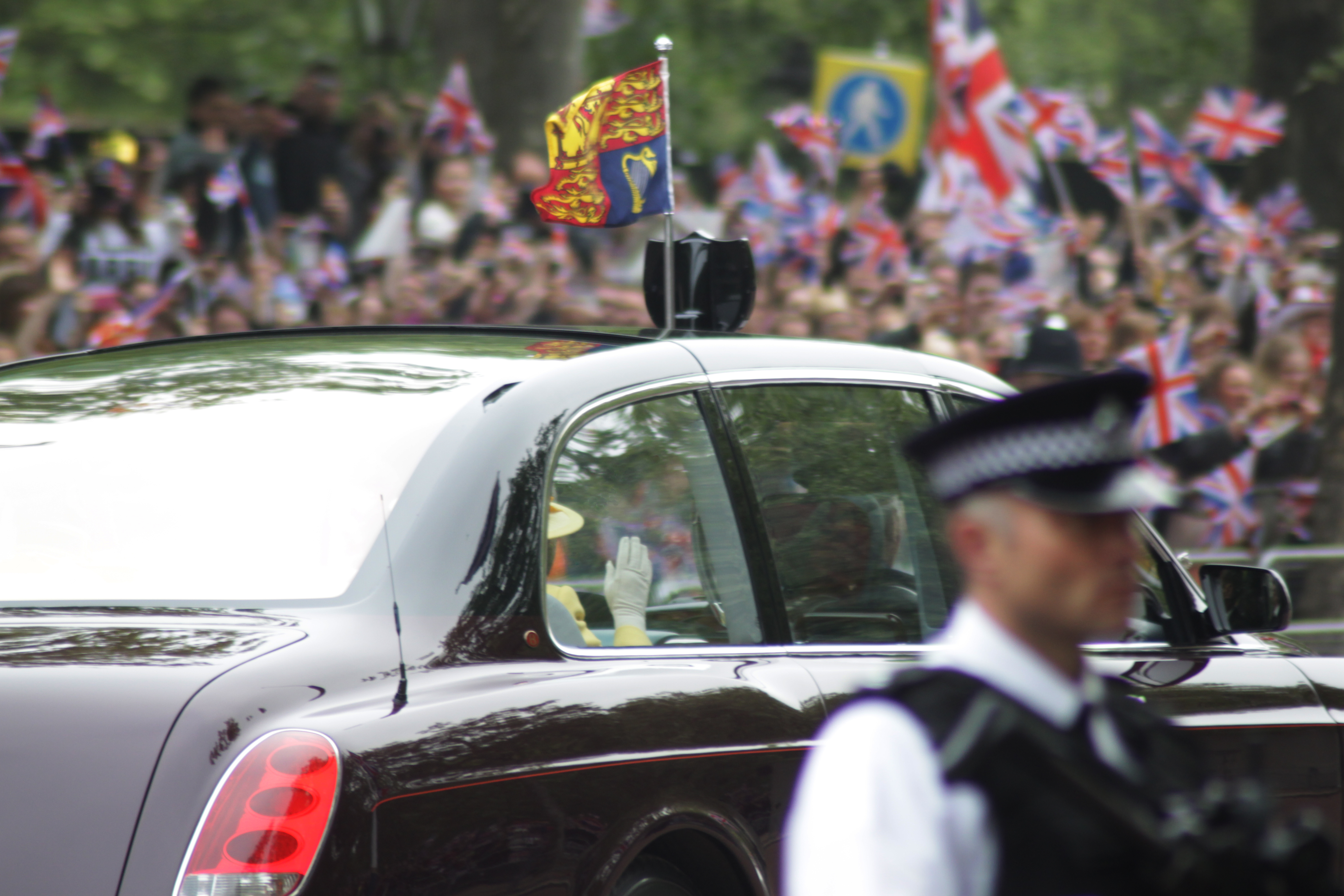
The British Royal Standard flying on top of the Queen's car during the wedding of Prince William and Catherine Middleton

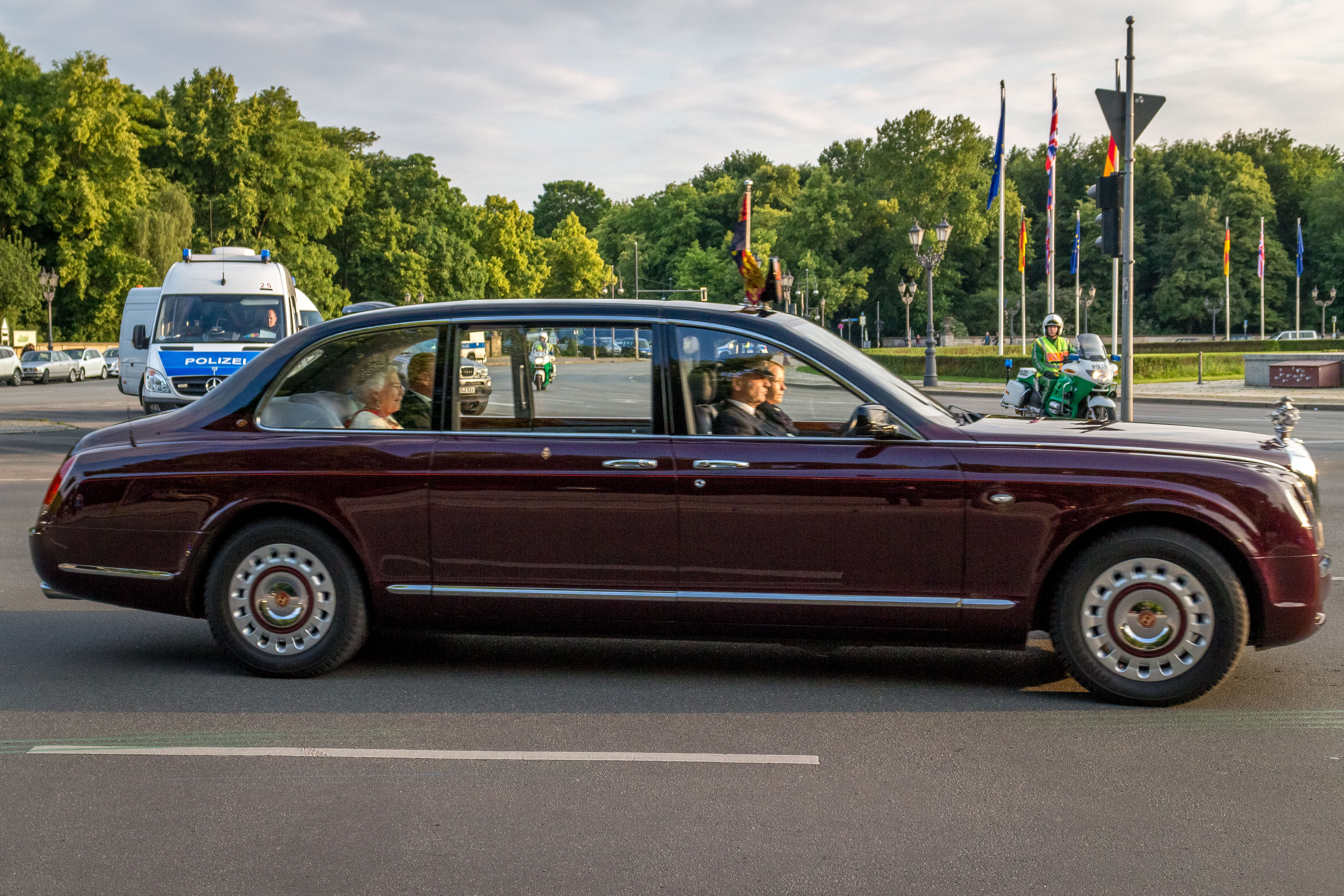
The Royal Standard flying on top of the Queen's car, during her state visit to Germany, 2015

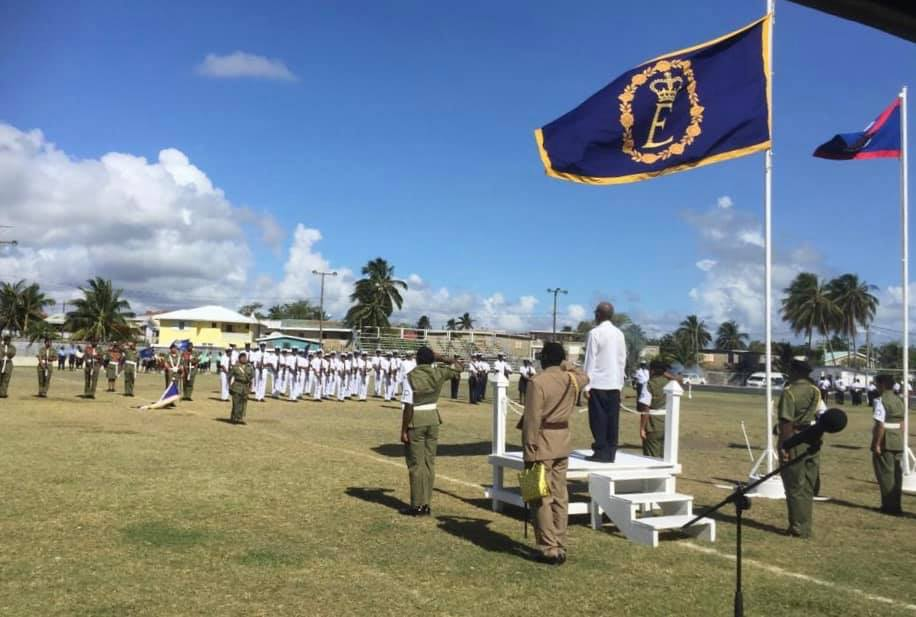
The Queen's personal flag flying at the Commonwealth Day parade in Belize City, 2019 (Although she was Queen of Belize, she had no Belizean Standard)

== See also ==
- Flags at Buckingham Palace
- Standard of Prince Philip, Duke of Edinburgh
- Flags of Charles III
