= Maggie Barrie =

Sierra Leonean sprinter (born 1996)

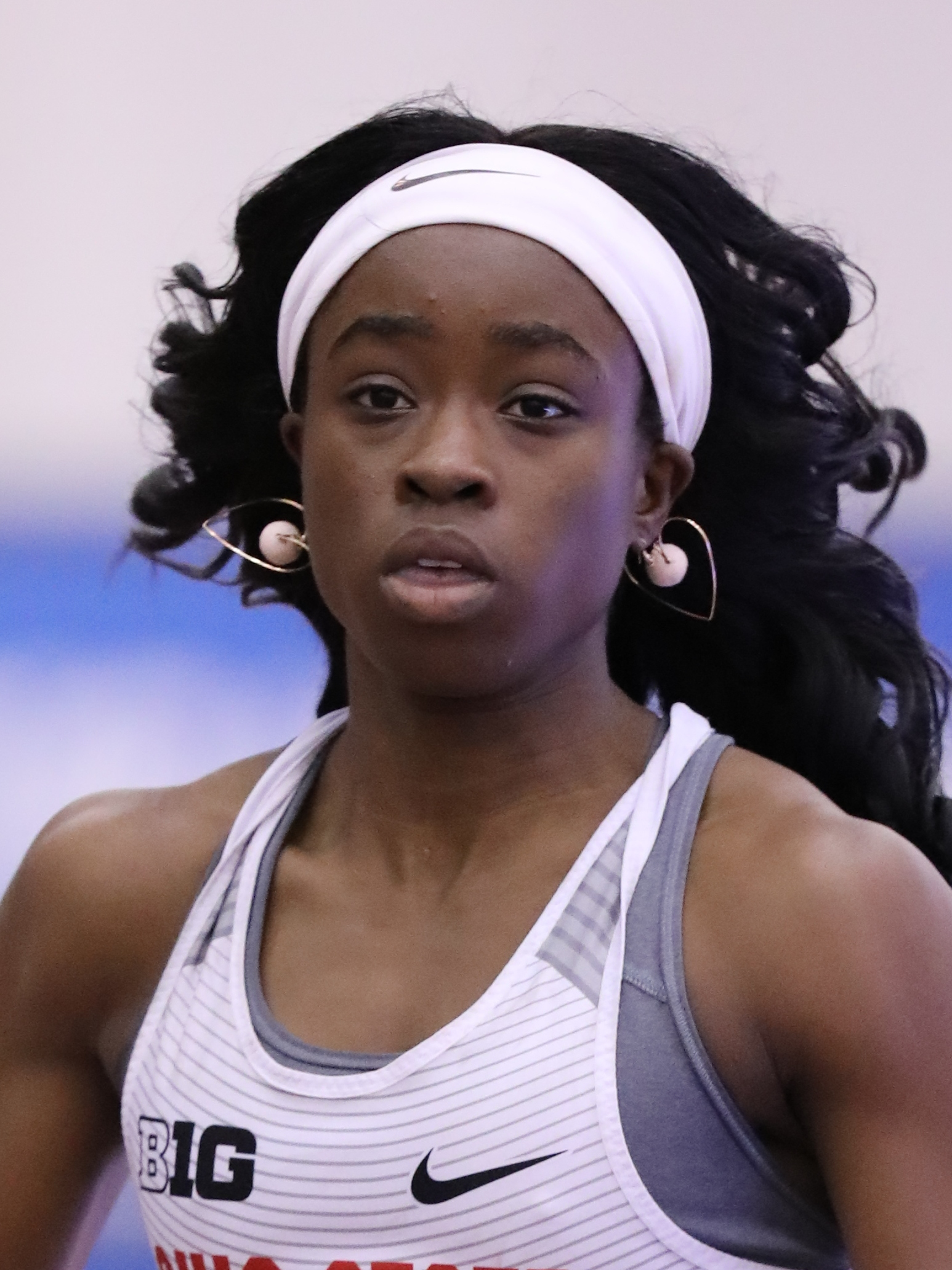
- Barrie in 2018

Personal information
- Full name: Margaret Vanessa Barrie
- Nationality: Sierra Leonean
- Born: 29 May 1996 (age 30)

Sport
- Sport: Sprinting
- Event: 400 metres
- College team: Ohio State University

Margaret Vanessa Barrie (born 29 May 1996) is Sierra Leonean Track and Field Olympian, who specialized in the 400 meters. She currently holds the national records for Sierra Leone in the 100, 200, and 400 meters, distinguishing her as the fastest female athlete in the country's history.

== Collegiate career ==
During her collegiate career at The Ohio State University, Barrie established herself as a standout sprinter. She set the Ohio State University record in the 400 meters in 2018 with a time of 51.36 seconds, a record that still stands today. Her collegiate accolades include being a three-time First Team All-American, a 2017 Honorable Mention All-American, and a First Team All-Big Ten selection.

Barrie was the 2017 Big Ten outdoor champion in the 4×400 meters relay and owns the school record for the indoor 4×400 meters relay (3:31.23). Individually, she earned silver at the Big Ten Championships and was a two-time Second Team All-Big Ten selection. Prior to her time in the Big Ten, she was the 2015 Big East champion in the 60-meter dash. Additionally, she broke Diane Dixon's long-standing French Field House record of 38.30 with a time of 38.17 to claim gold at the Buckeye Tune Up.

== International career ==
Barrie has represented Sierra Leone on the global stage at major competitions, including the women's 400 meters at the 2017 World Championships in Athletics. in London and the 2019 African Games in Rabat, Morocco.

She qualified for the 2020 Tokyo Olympic Games representing Sierra Leone, ranked 8th in the world at the time. Although she was expected to compete in her specialty event, the 400 meters, an administrative error resulted in her entry into the 100 metres instead.. Despite the unexpected change, Barrie ran a season's best and national record time to qualify for the next round. She placed second in her heat but did not advance to the semifinals.

Olympic Games
Preceded by Bunturabie Jalloh	Flag bearer for Sierra Leone; Tokyo 2020 with Frederick Harris	Succeeded by Mariama Koroma; Joshua Wyse
