= Queen of Sierra Leone =

Elizabeth II's reign in Sierra Leone from 1961 to 1971

- Coat of arms of Sierra Leone

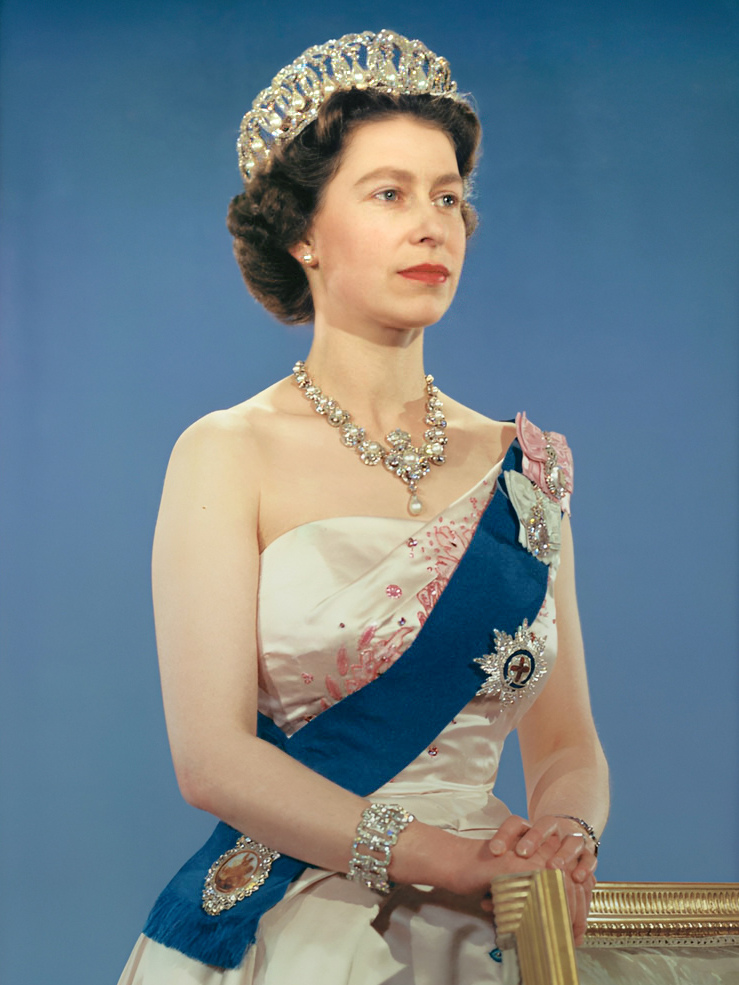
- Elizabeth II

Details
- Style: Her Majesty
- Formed: 27 April 1961
- Abolished: 19 April 1971

Elizabeth II was Queen of Sierra Leone from 1961 to 1971, when Sierra Leone was an independent constitutional monarchy. She was also the monarch of other sovereign states, including the United Kingdom. Her constitutional roles in Sierra Leone were mostly delegated to the governor-general of Sierra Leone.

== History ==
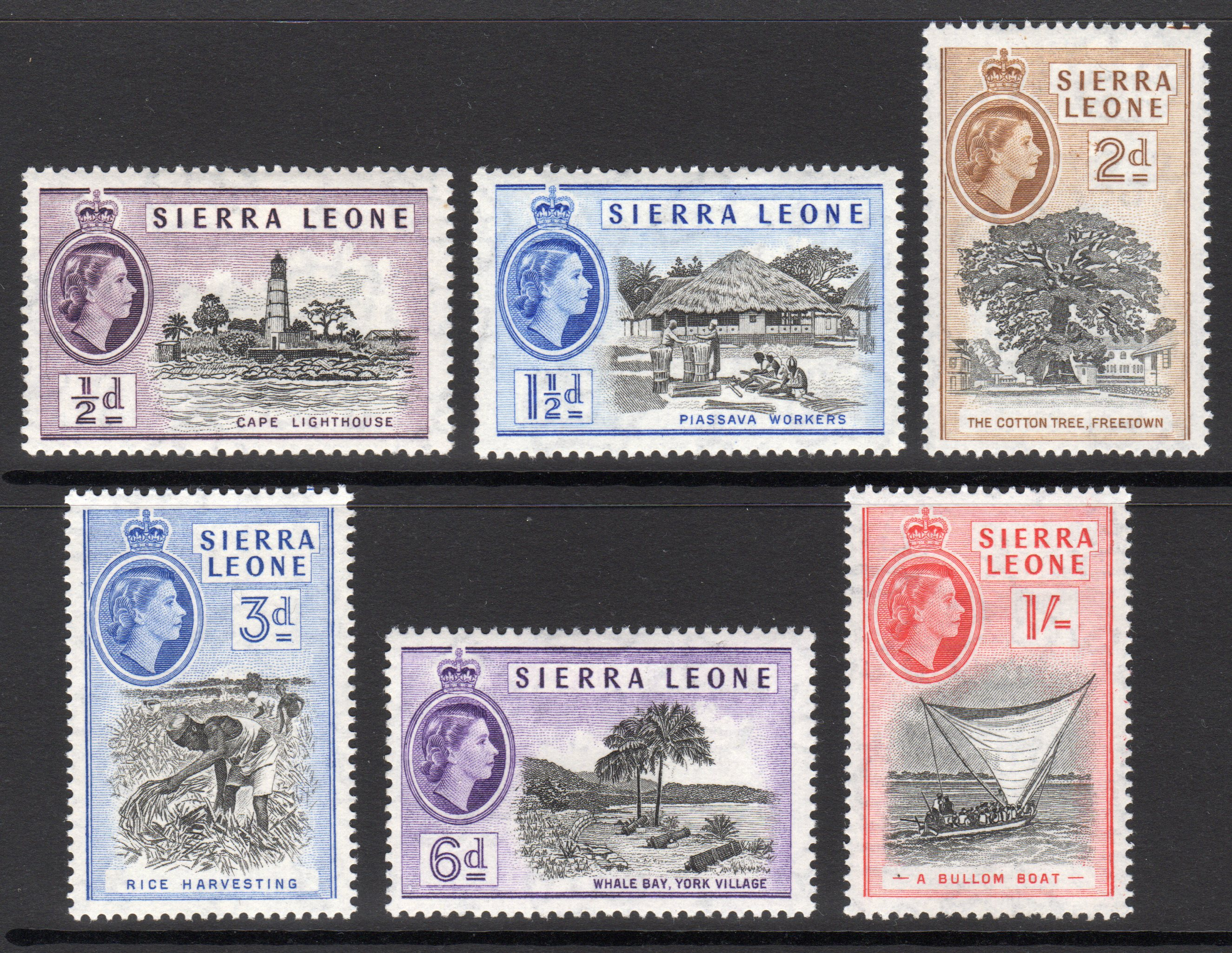
The Queen on Sierra Leonean stamps of 1956

Sierra Leone became independent by the Sierra Leone Independence Act 1961, which transformed the British Crown Colony of Sierra Leone into an independent member of the Commonwealth of Nations. Queen Elizabeth II became the head of state and Queen of Sierra Leone, and was represented by the governor-general who resided at the State House.

The Duke of Kent represented the Queen at the independence celebrations. Princess Alexandra of Kent represented the Queen at a Thanksgiving Service held in London on Sierra Leone's Independence Day. At Freetown, the Duke of Kent opened the new Parliament Building on 26 April. Sierra Leone became independent at midnight of 26–27 April and later that day the Duke took part in the State opening of Parliament, where the Duke handed over the constitutional instruments to Sir Milton Margai, which made Sierra Leone an independent nation. Later Sir Maurice Dorman, the Governor, was sworn in as the first Governor-General of Sierra Leone, the Queen's viceregal representative, by Chief Justice Beoku Betts.

The Queen sent a message to Sierra Leoneans, in which she said:

My husband and I are looking forward with pleasure to our own visit to you later this year, but today our thoughts are with you. It is with special pleasure that I welcome you to our Commonwealth family of nations. You step forward into the councils of the world at a time of rapid change, but I know that Sierra Leone, grounded firmly in her own traditions, will play a worthy part there. I send you my own good wishes and pray that God may bless and guide you throughout the coming years.

== Constitutional role ==
The flag of the Sierra Leonean Governor-General featuring the St Edward's Crown

Sierra Leone was one of the member states of the Commonwealth of Nations that shared the same person as Sovereign and head of state.

Effective with the Sierra Leone Independence Act 1961, no British government minister could advise the sovereign on any matters pertaining to Sierra Leone, meaning that on all matters of Sierra Leone, the monarch was advised solely by Sierra Leonean ministers of the Crown. All Sierra Leonean bills required Royal assent. The Sierra Leonean monarch was represented in the country by the Governor-General of Sierra Leone, who was appointed by the monarch on the advice of the Prime Minister of Sierra Leone.

=== The Crown and Government ===
The Sierra Leonean monarch and the Sierra Leonean House of Representatives constituted the Parliament of Sierra Leone. All executive powers of Sierra Leone rested with the sovereign. All laws in Sierra Leone were enacted only with the granting of royal assent, done by the Governor-General on behalf of the sovereign. The Governor-General was also responsible for summoning, proroguing, and dissolving Parliament. The Governor-General had the power to choose and appoint the Council of Ministers and could dismiss them under his discretion. All Sierra Leonean ministers of the Crown held office at the pleasure of the Governor-General.

=== The Crown and Foreign affairs ===
Sierra Leonean representatives to foreign countries were accredited by the monarch in her capacity as Queen of Sierra Leone and Sierra Leonean envoys sent abroad required royal approval. The letters of credence were formally issued in the name of the monarch.

=== The Crown and the Courts ===
All Sierra Leonean judges had to swear that they would "well and truly serve" the monarch of Sierra Leone and "do right to all manner of people after the laws and usages of Sierra Leone without fear or favour, affection or ill will".

The highest court of appeal for Sierra Leone was the Judicial Committee of the Queen's Privy Council. The monarch, and by extension the governor-general, could also grant immunity from prosecution, exercise the royal prerogative of mercy, and pardon offences against the Crown, either before, during, or after a trial.

== Royal style and titles ==
The proclamation of the Queen's style and titles published in the Sierra Leone Gazette

The Royal Style and Titles Act, 1961 of the Sierra Leonean Parliament granted the monarch separate style and titles in her role as Queen of Sierra Leone.

Elizabeth II had the following style and titles in her role as the monarch of Sierra Leone:

- 27 April 1961 – 28 December 1961: Elizabeth the Second, by the Grace of God, of the United Kingdom of Great Britain and Northern Ireland and of Her other Realms and Territories Queen, Head of the Commonwealth, Defender of the Faith
- 28 December 1961 – 19 April 1971: Elizabeth the Second, Queen of Sierra Leone and of Her Other Realms and Territories, Head of the Commonwealth

== Oath of allegiance ==
The oath of allegiance in Sierra Leone was:

"I, (name), do swear that I will be faithful and bear true allegiance to Her Majesty Queen Elizabeth the Second, Her Heirs and Successors according to law. So help me God".

A person could choose to replace the word swear with the phrase solemnly and sincerely affirm and declare, and to omit the phrase so help me God.

== Cultural role ==
For more than a hundred and fifty years we had been associated with the British Crown. But much as our people loved Queen Victoria and have been proud to be loyal subjects of the Crown in succeeding years, it was not by our own choice. We were not then free to choose. Now, Your Majesty, we are free, free to determine our own future, free to make our own choice. In that freedom we have chosen Your Majesty and one and all in Sierra Leone today applauds that choice. You yourself have graciously consented to become Our Queen. Your Majesty has acquired a new, proud and devoted people—we have acquired our own Queen who now knows us as we know her.

— Milton Margai, Prime Minister of Sierra Leone, 1961

=== The Crown and Honours ===
Within Commonwealth realms, the monarch is deemed the "fount of honour". Similarly, the monarch, as Sovereign of Sierra Leone, conferred awards and honours in Sierra Leone in her name. Most of them were awarded on the advice of "Her Majesty's Sierra Leone Ministers".

=== The Crown and the Defence Force ===
The Governor-General was the Commander-in-Chief of Sierra Leone.

The Crown sat at the pinnacle of the Sierra Leonean Defence Force. It was reflected in the Sierra Leonean Military Forces, which were known as "Royal Sierra Leone Military Forces". The prefix "Royal" was dropped when the Sierra Leonean monarchy was abolished.

=== Queen's Personal Flag for Sierra Leone ===
The Queen's Personal Flag for Sierra Leone

Queen Elizabeth II had a personal flag for use in Sierra Leone. It was used for the first time when she visited the nation in 1961. The flag featured the coat of arms of Sierra Leone in banner form, which depicts a lion beneath a zigzag border, representing the Lion Mountains, after which the country was named. It also shows three torches which are meant to symbolize peace and dignity. At the base are wavy bars depicting the sea. A blue disc of the letter "E" crowned surrounded by a garland of gold roses defaces the flag, which is taken from the Queen's Personal Flag. The Sierra Leonean standard also served as the inspiration for the design and layout of her personal standard for Canada.

=== Royal tour of 1961 ===
The Queen said in her Christmas broadcast in 1958, that she and her husband would be visiting Sierra Leone in late 1959. But later the visit was postponed, as she had become pregnant in 1959.

External videos
- Sierra Leone Greets the Queen (1961) Source: BFI National Archive.

Queen Elizabeth II and her husband, Prince Philip, visited Sierra Leone from 25 November to 1 December 1961. They arrived in Freetown on the royal yacht Britannia, and Queen Elizabeth II Quay was so-named as a result.

Elizabeth II was welcomed as the Queen of Sierra Leone and she also used a distinct Sierra Leonean flag. Colloquially, she was referred to as Mama Queen II by the people of Sierra Leone. She was given a gold key to the city of Freetown by its mayor, who wore red robes and a cocked hat. The Queen and her husband stayed at the governor-general's residence during their visit. The monarch also presented new colours to the Royal Sierra Leone Regiment at the Brookfields Stadium. The new Queen's Colour incorporated the new flag of Sierra Leone. The new colours, placed upon piled drums, were blessed by the imam of the Muslim Congress – "In thy holy name, O Allah, most gracious, most merciful" – by the Roman Catholic bishop of Freetown and Bo, by the president of the United Christian Council and by the Anglican bishop of Freetown.

In Bo, a durbar of paramount chiefs was held for the Queen at the Bo Coronation field, where chiefs and their "Devil Dancers" performed for the royal couple. Each paramount chief was presented to the monarch and awarded a commemorative medal.

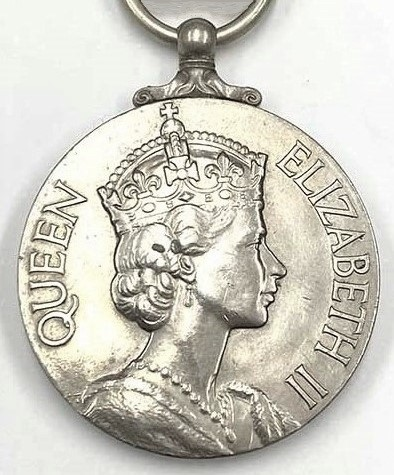
A Sierra Leonean medal bearing Queen Elizabeth II's effigy and an inscription on the obverse

The Queen and the Duke toured several places and attended a number of events, including the Bo Hospital, an agricultural show in Kenema, the iron ore in Marampa, the Sierra Leone Press and Radio, a civic reception by the Freetown City Council, a gathering of chiefs and people at Port Loko, and the Children's Rally and Citizens' Parade in Freetown. In honour of the royal visit, an entire model village was laid out, so that the Queen could see how some of the people of Sierra Leone live in villages. She and her husband also attended a divine service at the St. George's Cathedral in Freetown, where they were received by the Bishop of Sierra Leone. The Duke of Edinburgh also visited the Guma Valley, where a dam was being built. At the University of Sierra Leone, Queen Elizabeth II, being the visitor of the university, presented degrees to students, accompanied by her husband and the prime minister.

It gives great satisfaction to me and to my husband that we should be able to visit Sierra Leone at this historic stage in its development. It has been a great pleasure to see for ourselves its beauty and to meet so many of its peoples.

— Elizabeth II of Sierra Leone, 1961

At a dinner banquet, Prime Minister Sir Milton Margai addressed the Queen and said, "your visit means above everything else that you are more to us than a distant Head of the Commonwealth. You are indeed Our Queen and we have a special claim on your interest, sympathy and affection". The Queen, speaking of Prime Minister Sir Milton Margai, said, "Sierra Leone can count herself truly fortunate, but while gaining her independence, she has found a leader wise, experienced and devoted to her people". In Freetown, she visited the Parliament of Sierra Leone, where she received a loyal address.

At the end of the tour, a garden party was given by Margai at his official residence. During her departure from Sierra Leone, the Queen was presented with an indigenous Sierra Leonean diamond by Margai, as a farewell gift.

== Abolition ==
The Sierra Leonean monarchy was abolished in 1971, when the country became a republic within the Commonwealth with a president as head of state.

== See also ==
- Medals of Sierra Leone (1961–1971)
- Sierra Leone Independence Medal
