= Sierra Leone Colony and Protectorate =

British colony (1808–1861) and protectorate (1896–1961)

Colony and Protectorate of Sierra Leone
- 1808–1961
- Flag (1916–1961) Coat of arms (1914–1960)
- Motto: Auspice Britannia liber (Latin: "Free under the protection of Britain")
- Anthem: God Save the King (1808–1837; 1901–1952); God Save the Queen (1837–1901; 1952–1961)
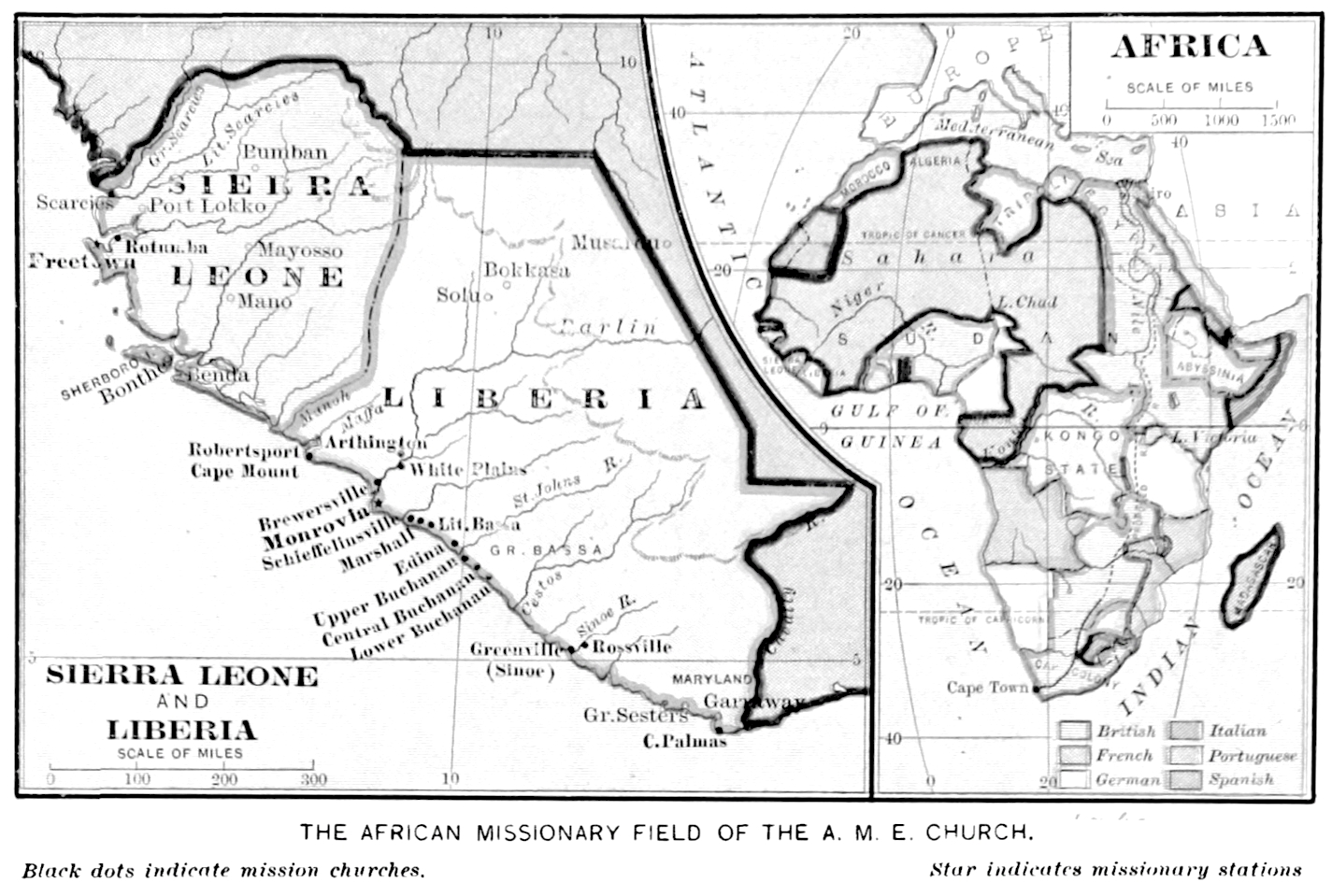
- The Colony and Protectorate of Sierra Leone in 1899
- Status: British colony
- Capital: Freetown
- Official languages: English
- Recognised national languages: Krio
- Religion: Christianity, Islam
- Monarch
  - 1808–1820 (first): George III
  - 1952–1971 (last): Elizabeth II
- Governor
  - 1808 (first): Thomas Ludlam
  - 1956–1961 (last): Maurice Dorman
- Prime Minister^{a}
  - 1947–1961: Milton Margai
- Legislature: Legislative Council (1863–1954); House of Representatives (after 1954)
- Historical era: Abolitionism; New Imperialism; Decolonisation of Africa
  - Colony established: 1 January 1808
  - Protectorate established: 31 August 1896
  - Independence as Sierra Leone: 27 April 1961

Area
- 1924: 81,999 km^{2} (31,660 sq mi)

Population
  - 1808: 2,000
  - 1924: 1,541,311
  - 1955: 2,051,845
  - 1960: 2,181,701
- Currency: Pound sterling (1808–1912); British West African pound (1912–1961)
- ISO 3166 code: SL
Preceded by
Kingdom of Koya
Samorian State
Solimana (state)
Guinea Company (London)
Succeeded by
Dominion of Sierra Leone
- Today part of: Sierra Leone
- 1. The official name for head of government of Sierra Leone was "Chief Minister of Sierra Leone" from 1954 until 1958 and "Prime Minister of Sierra Leone" from 1958 until 1961.

The Colony and Protectorate of Sierra Leone (informally British Sierra Leone) was the British colonial administration in Sierra Leone from 1808 to 1961, part of the British Empire from the abolitionism era until the decolonisation era. The Crown colony, which included the area surrounding Freetown, was established in 1808. The protectorate was established in 1896 and included the interior of what is today known as Sierra Leone.

The motto of the colony and protectorate was Auspice Britannia liber (Latin for "Free under the protection of Britain"). This motto was included on Sierra Leone's later flag and coat of arms.

== History ==
=== Origins ===
In the 1780s, London was home to several thousand freed slaves and Black Pioneers, who had gained their freedom fighting on the side of the British in the American Revolutionary War. After several avenues to employment were closed to them, many of the Black Poor ended up destitute, and received support from the Committee for the Relief of the Black Poor. This Committee eventually decided to persuade several hundred members of the Black Poor community to emigrate to Africa.

The Sierra Leone Resettlement Scheme was proposed by entomologist Henry Smeathman and drew interest from humanitarians like Granville Sharp, who saw it as a means of showing the pro-slavery lobby that black people could contribute towards the running of the new colony of Sierra Leone. Government officials soon became involved in the scheme as well, although their interest was spurred by the possibility of resettling a large group of poor citizens elsewhere. William Pitt the Younger, prime minister and leader of the Tory party, had an active interest in the Scheme, because he saw it as a means to repatriate the Black Poor to Africa, since "it was necessary they should be sent somewhere, and be no longer suffered to infest the streets of London".

The British made an agreement with a Temne chief King Tom to have land on the coast for the settlement of freed slaves. In 1787, a naval vessel carrying 411 passengers, including freed slaves, Black Pioneers, their white wives, and mixed-race children, arrived on the coast. Opponents of miscegenation incorrectly labelled the white wives of these black men as prostitutes. The settlement became known as Granville Town.

Half of the settlers in the new colony died within the first year. Several black settlers started working for local slave traders. The settlers who remained, forcibly captured land from a local chieftain, but he retaliated, attacking the settlement, which was reduced to a mere 64 settlers comprising 39 black men, 19 black women, and six white women. The settlers were captured by unscrupulous traders and sold into slavery, and the remaining colonists were forced to arm themselves for their own protection. King Tom's successor King Jemmy attacked and burned the colony in 1789.

A new colony was built on another site and became known as Freetown. In 1792 approximately 1,200 Nova Scotian Settlers, freed slaves and Black Pioneers from Nova Scotia, and in 1800 another 551 Jamaican Maroons from the Colony of Jamaica came to the new settlement. The Settler descendants gradually developed as an ethnicity known as the Sierra Leone Creole people.

The first Christian missionaries, Peter Hartwig and Melchior Renner arrived in 1804 with the Church Missionary Society

The British government abolished the slave trade in 1807. It took responsibility of Sierra Leone in 1808 and made it a Crown colony.

=== Early 19th century to mid-20th century ===
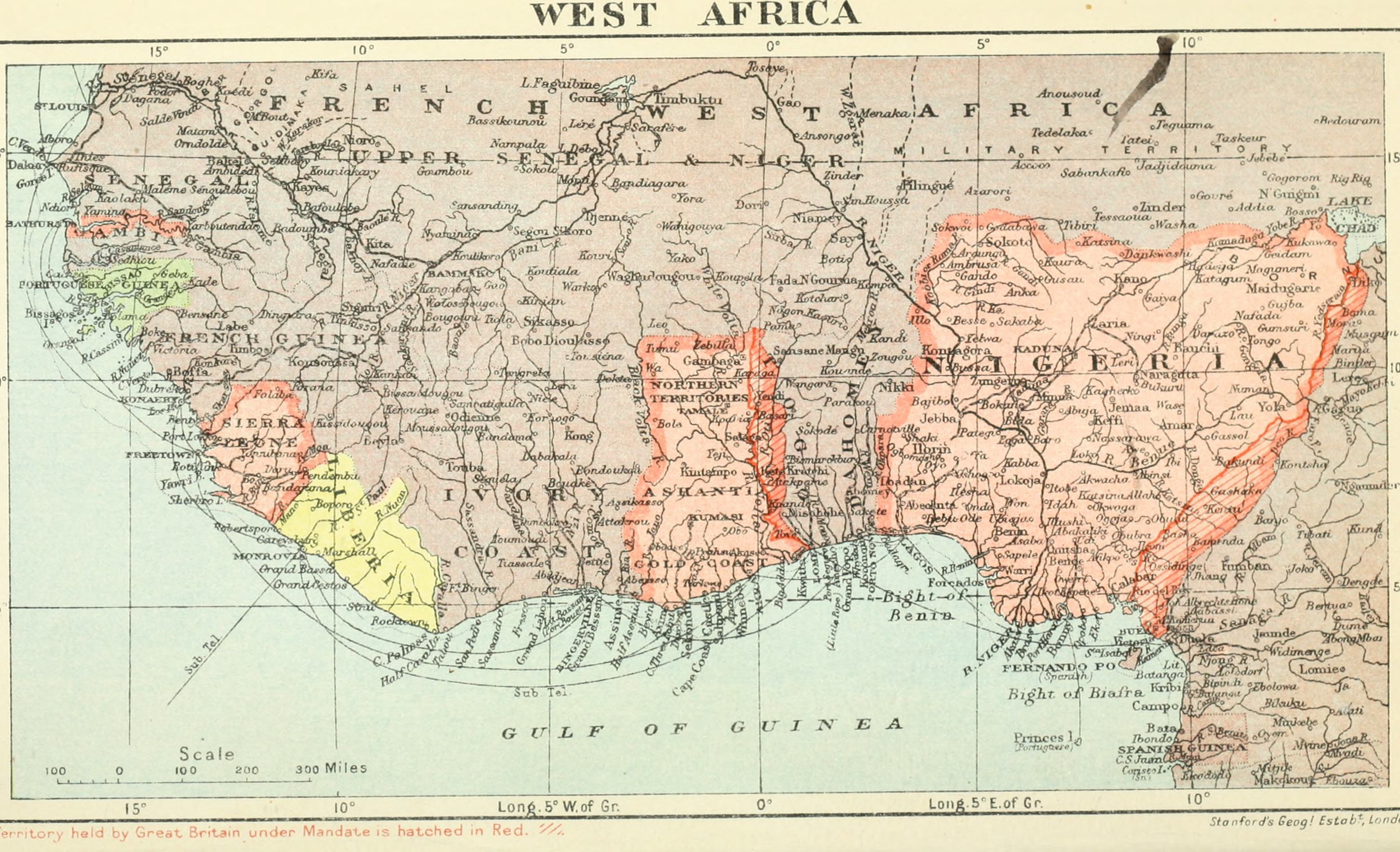
Map of West Africa, 1922; British territories in pink.

On 17 October 1821, the Sierra Leone Colony was made part of British West Africa, an administrative entity consisting of British colonies in West Africa. The entity's original name was Colony of Sierra Leone and its Dependencies, after which it became British West African Territories and finally British West African Settlements. British West Africa was constituted during two periods, from 17 October 1821 until its first dissolution on 13 January 1850, and again from 19 February 1866 until its final demise on 28 November 1888. Freetown served as the capital of British West Africa through the entity's entire existence.

On 31 August 1896, the hinterland of Sierra Leone became a British protectorate, thus creating Sierra Leone Protectorate. The boundaries were demarcated with French Guinea and Liberia.

On 1 January 1928 the British abolished domestic slavery.

In 1930 Sierra Leone Development Company (DELCO), a British company, started mining iron ore.

In 1932 Sierra Leone Selection Trust, a subsidiary of the British Consolidated African Selection Trust (CAST), was set up to mine diamonds.

In 1937 a "Native Administration" system, patterned after Lord Lugard's indirect rule system in northern Nigeria, was introduced into the Sierra Leone Protectorate.

In 1938 Wallace Johnson started the West African Youth League in Freetown, mobilising workers in new trade unions against the colonial government.

When World War II began in 1939, emergency powers were used to incarcerate Wallace Johnson.

In 1947 a new constitution was proposed for the colony, which gave the majority of seats in Legislative Council to the majority population of the protectorate.

=== Road to independence ===
In the post World War II era many members of the public in Sierra Leone began advocating for independence. Politicians led by Sir Milton Margai campaigned for this within the colonial government of Sierra Leone and throughout the 1950s won office on those grounds. Throughout the mid to late 1950s, Margai and many other Sierra Leone politicians petitioned the British government for independence. British Prime Minister Harold Macmillan already supported the policy of granting independence to Britain's African colonies and ordered his government to receive the petitions and act on them. The next few steps, which Prime Minister Macmillan approved, were to create a stable path to a peaceful transfer of power. A referendum was held in Sierra Leone asking if the population of the country wanted independence. The majority voted in favour of independence in that referendum. Macmillan privately stated that he knew they would vote yes, however, this was a formality in order to show his own government that there was popular support within Sierra Leone for a British withdrawal. Margai and other Sierra Leone independence leaders supported the idea. After the referendum passed, as all involved assumed it would, the colonial administration in Freetown began holding elections to establish the government that would take over after the handover of power. These elections were won by Margai and his supporters. In May 1957, Sierra Leone held its first parliamentary election. The Sierra Leone People's Party (SLPP), which was then the most popular political party in the colony of Sierra Leone as well as being supported by the powerful paramount chiefs in the provinces, won the most seats in Parliament and Margai was re-elected as Chief Minister by a landslide. On 20 April 1960, Margai led a 24-member Sierra Leonean delegation at constitutional conferences that were held with the Government of Macmillan and British Colonial Secretary Iain Macleod where the details of independence were agreed to. On the conclusion of talks in London on 4 May 1960, the United Kingdom agreed to grant Sierra Leone independence on 27 April 1961.

On 27 April 1961 Sierra Leone was granted independence at a large ceremony in Freetown. Bands played, the Union Jack was lowered, respectfully folded, and handed to the Duke of Kent (at the time Prince Edward), the new blue, white and green flag of Sierra Leone was raised in its place, the Duke of Kent and Margai shook hands and the crowd cheered. The last British Governor of Sierra Leone was sworn in by the new independent government as the Governor-General (Queen Elizabeth II's representative to the new country.) There was a brief state of emergency, as opposition leader Siaka Stevens, whose political party the All People's Congress (APC) had lost the previous elections to Margai boycotted the ceremony, and it was feared would try to sabotage the handover of power. It was feared the APC would attempt to incite riots, on this basis Stevens was placed under house arrest prior to the ceremony and released shortly afterwards. Ultimately however the transfer of power proved to be entirely peaceful. Messages of congratulations were sent from Prime Minister Harold Macmillan and from Queen Elizabeth to the people of Sierra Leone and to Margai personally. Sierra Leone was granted independence as a dominion, along the same lines that Canada and Australia had been earlier, this meant that Sierra Leone was now an independent country with its own parliament and its own Prime Minister, however, Queen Elizabeth would remain the head of state. Thus began the history of the Dominion of Sierra Leone.

=== Independence ===
Sierra Leone Colony and Protectorate lasted until 1961 when it gained independence from the United Kingdom, with Elizabeth II as Queen of Sierra Leone. It retained her as head of state for a decade until 1971, when the country became a republic.

== See also ==
- Chief Justice of Sierra Leone
- Governor of Sierra Leone
