= Frederick Harris (judoka) =

Sierra Leonean judoka

Personal information
- Born: 7 December 1984 (age 41)
- Occupation: Judoka

Sport
- Country: Sierra Leone
- Sport: Judo
- Rank: 2nd dan black belt

Profile at external databases
- IJF: 16913
- JudoInside.com: 100248

Frederick Harris (born 7 December 1984) is a judoka from Sierra Leone.

He was selected to compete in the Judo at the 2020 Summer Olympics – Men's 81 kg. He was the flag bearer for Sierra Leone at the opening ceremony in Tokyo. However, Harris did not compete after being disqualified for being overweight.

Olympic Games
Preceded by Bunturabie Jalloh	Flag bearer for Sierra Leone; Tokyo 2020 with Maggie Barrie	Succeeded by Mariama Koroma; Joshua Wyse
