= Bunturabie Jalloh =

Sierra Leonean swimmer

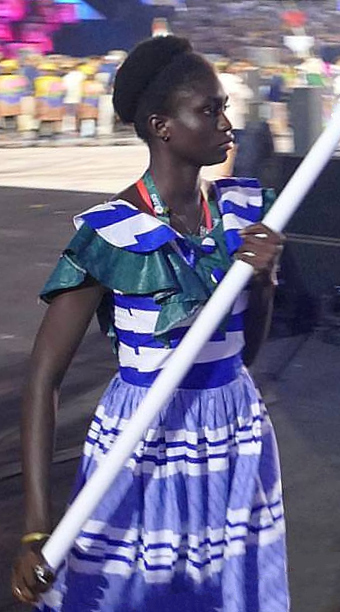
- Jalloh at the 2016 Summer Olympics Parade of Nations

Personal information
- Nationality: Sierra Leonean
- Born: 10 May 1998 (age 28) Bo, Sierra Leone
- Weight: 79 kg (174 lb)

Sport
- Sport: Swimming
- Strokes: Freestyle
- Coach: Bobson Mansaray (national)

Bunturabie Effuah Rashida Jalloh (born 10 May 1998) is a Sierra Leonean swimmer.

== Biography ==
Jalloh was born in Bo in 1998 in southern Sierra Leone. She grew up in Freetown. She attended the Bilingual High School Murray Town.

Jalloh went to the 2015 All Africa Games in Brazzaville. She won two bronze medals as part of a team at the 5th Africa Zone two (2) championship in Senegal at both the 4x100 and 4x200 freestyle relays.

She placed 88th in the 50 metre freestyle event at the 2016 Summer Olympics with a time of 39.85 seconds, setting a national record. She did not advance to the semifinals. She was the flagbearer for Sierra Leone during the opening ceremony.

Olympic Games
Preceded by Ola Sesay	Flag bearer for Sierra Leone; 2016 Rio de Janeiro	Succeeded by Maggie Barrie; Frederick Harris
