= Lion Mountains =

Mountain range in Sierra Leone

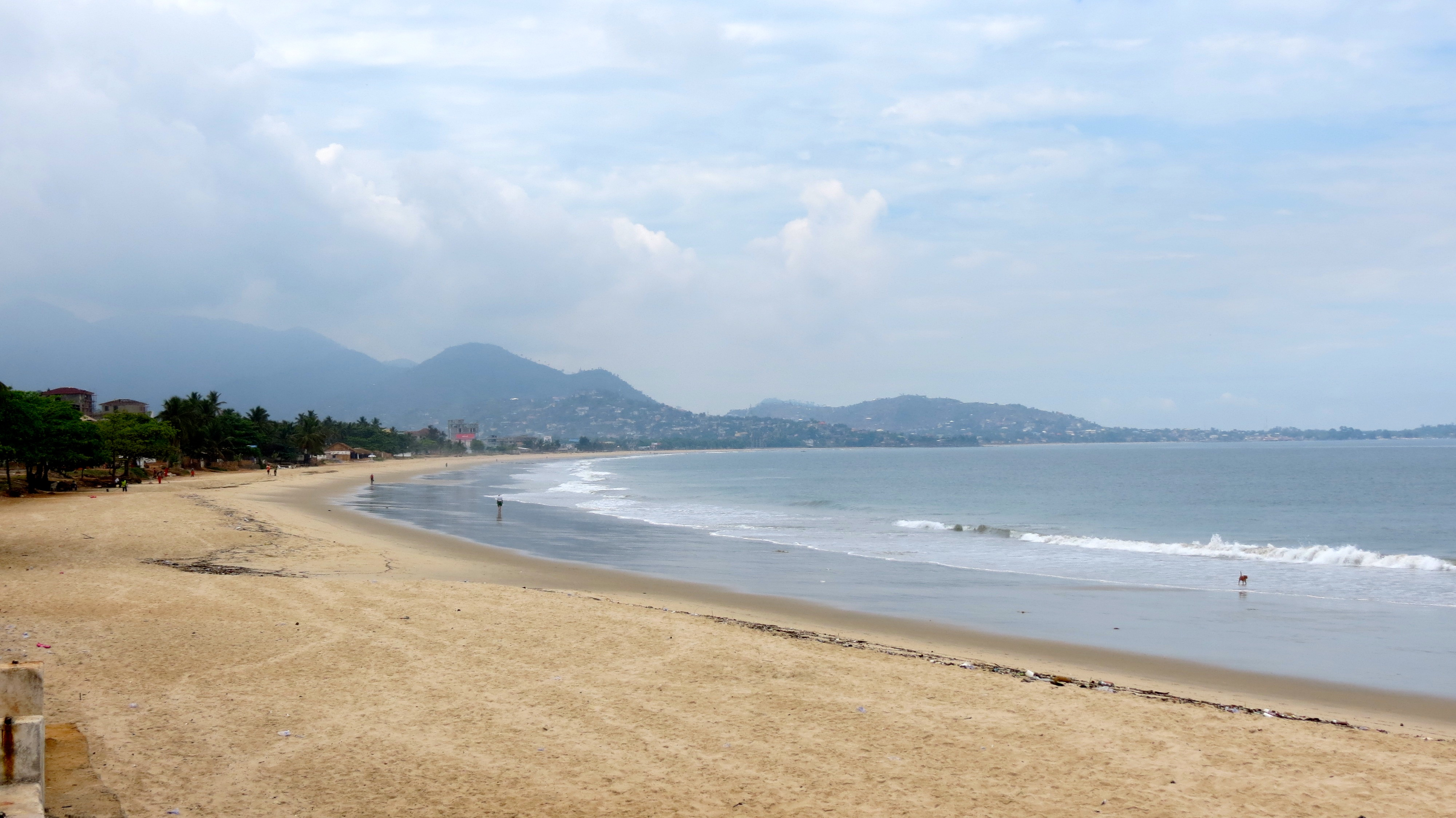
- Beach in Freetown with the Lion Mountains in the background.

Highest point
- Peak: Picket Hill
- Elevation: 888 m (2,913 ft)

Geography
- Location within Sierra Leone
- Location: Sierra Leone
- Range coordinates: 8°20′31″N 13°10′13″W

The Lion Mountains (also called Lioness Mountains or Peninsula Mountains, originally from Portuguese: Serra Leoa) are a mountain range in Sierra Leone. The range stretches 30 kilometres (19 mi) on the Freetown Peninsula by the Atlantic Ocean, southeast of the capital, Freetown. The mountains are part of the Western Area Forest Reserve, a nature reserve with a hunting ban, established in 1916. The highest point is Picket Hill at 888 metres (2,913 ft).

The Lion Mountains lie isolated on the coast of the Atlantic, and are surrounded by sea and lowlands in all directions. Around 200 kilometres (120 mi) inland the terrain starts to elevate up to the Guinea Highlands, the closest mountains. Being the only significant coastal mountains between Morocco and Cameroon, the Lion Mountains were a striking feature to the early European explorers.

The republic of Sierra Leone is named after the range. The Portuguese explorer Pedro de Sintra named in 1462 the mountains Serra Leoa (Lioness Mountains). At a later point in time, Italian cartographers consulted the Italian explorer Alvise Cadamosto about the name of the mountains. He referred to them as Sierra Leone in his own language, and since then the Italian name has been used.
