= Flags of Charles III =

King Charles III has and has had a variety of flags to represent him as a prince, duke, and, eventually, head of state of three of his 15 realms; in the latter case, the heraldic flags are the nation's coat of arms in banner form. The flags are usually used on any building, ship, car, or aircraft where Charles is present.

== As heir apparent ==
Prince Charles had six personal standards prior to his accession as King. As Prince of Wales, his primary standard consisted of four quarters consisting of three lions passant for England, a lion rampant for Scotland, and a Gaelic harp for Ireland, superimposed with the arms of Llywelyn the Great.

Prince of Wales (used throughout the United Kingdom and abroad)

Prince of Wales (used in Wales)

Prince and Great Steward of Scotland and Lord of the Isles (used in Scotland)

Duke of Rothesay (used in Scotland)

Duke of Cornwall (used in Cornwall)

Prince of Wales (used in Canada)

== As sovereign ==
=== United Kingdom ===
Upon the death of his mother, Prince Charles became King Charles III and, therefore, inherited two versions of the royal standard of the United Kingdom: one for use in Scotland and one for use elsewhere. The latter is used to represent the King not only in the United Kingdom, aside from Scotland, but, also overseas when he makes state visits as King of the United Kingdom. It is the British royal arms in banner form undifferentiated.

The standard of Charles III, King of the United Kingdom, used in the United Kingdom outside of Scotland and abroad

The standard of Charles III, King of the United Kingdom, used in Scotland

=== Canada ===
Charles possesses a Canadian standard, called the sovereign's flag for Canada, to represent him not only in Canada, but, also overseas when he makes state or official visits as King of Canada. The flag was unveiled on 6 May 2023, the day of Charles's coronation, and consists of the escutcheon of the royal coat of arms of Canada in banner form.

The sovereign's flag for Canada, used throughout Canada and abroad

=== Australia ===
On 30 August 2024, a personal flag for use in Australia was approved by the King. The flag consists of a banner of the coat of arms of Australia. It was flown for the first time during the King's royal tour in October 2024.

The standard of Charles III, King of Australia, used throughout Australia and abroad

== See also ==
- Flags at Buckingham Palace
- Flags of Elizabeth II
