= Osman Kamara =

Osman Kamara is the name of:

- Osman Kamara (footballer)
- Osman Kamara (swimmer)
