= Coat of arms of Sierra Leone =

National coat of arms of the Republic of Sierra Leone

- Armiger: Republic of Sierra Leone
- Adopted: 1960
- Shield: Vert a lion passant Or armed and langued Gules standing on a base Argent, two bars wavy Azure, and a chief indented of four points Argent, three flaming torches Sable, its flames Gules
- Supporters: Two lions rampant Or, armed and langued Gules, each supporting a palm-tree proper
- Compartment: A grassy ground Vert
- Motto: UNITY, FREEDOM, JUSTICE

The coat of arms of Sierra Leone (along with the flag), were developed by the College of Arms and granted in 1960.

== Design ==
The shield on the arms depicts a lion beneath a zigzag border, representing the Lion Mountains, after which the country was named. It also shows three torches which are meant to symbolize peace and dignity. At the base are wavy bars depicting the sea.

The supporters of the shield are lions, similar to those on the colonial badge. The three main colours from the shield – green, white and blue – were used to form the flag.

The green represents agricultural and natural resources, the blue represents the Harbour of Freetown and the white represents unity and justice. At the bottom of the shield, the national motto can be seen.

== Blazon ==
The coat of arms of Sierra Leone are described as:

(a) for arms-

1. Vert a lion passant Or armed and langued Gules.
2. Standing on a base Argent, two bars wavy Azure.
3. And a chief indented of four points Argent, three flaming torches Sable, its flames Gules.

(b) for the supporters-

1. Two lions rampant Or, armed and langued Gules, each supporting a palm-tree proper.
2. They stand on a grassy ground Vert.

(c) with the motto "UNITY, FREEDOM, JUSTICE”.

== Colonial arms ==
The arms of the Colony of Sierra Leone were granted by royal warrant of 30 July 1914:

Per pale Argent and Or on the dexter issuant from the base in front of a Ship under sail on waves of the Sea a representation of the sea shore, seated thereon the figure of a Negro, representing a freed slave, cloaked and armed with a spear and quiver of arrows, all proper, on the sinister, on a Mount Vert an Oil Palm tree also proper, a Chief charged with the Union device as used at the time of the cession of Sierra Leone to be a Settlement for freed slaves under British protection, together with the Motto "Auspice Britannia liber."

The "Union device as used at the time of the cession" was the flag of Great Britain.

Badge of Sierra Leone (1889–1914)

Coat of arms of Sierra Leone (1914–1960)
