= Joshua Wyse =

Sierra Leonean swimmer

Personal information
- Full name: Joshua Jonathan Julius Wyse
- Born: 24 March 2001 (age 25) Freetown, Sierra Leone
- Height: 158 cm (5 ft 2 in)

Sport
- Country: Sierra Leone
- Sport: Swimming

Joshua Jonathan Julius Wyse (born 24 March 2001) is a Sierra Leonean swimmer. He competed in the 2020 Summer Olympics.

Olympic Games
Preceded by Maggie Barrie; Frederick Harris	Flag bearer for Sierra Leone; Paris 2024 with Mariama Koroma	Succeeded by Incumbent
