= Flag of Sierra Leone =

Republic of Sierra Leone
- Use: National flag, civil and state ensign
- Proportion: 2:3
- Adopted: 27 April 1961; 65 years ago
- Design: A horizontal tricolour of light green, white and light blue
- Use: Naval ensign
- Proportion: 2:3
- Adopted: 27 April 1961; 65 years ago
- Design: White flag with the national flag in canton

Standard of the president of Sierra Leone

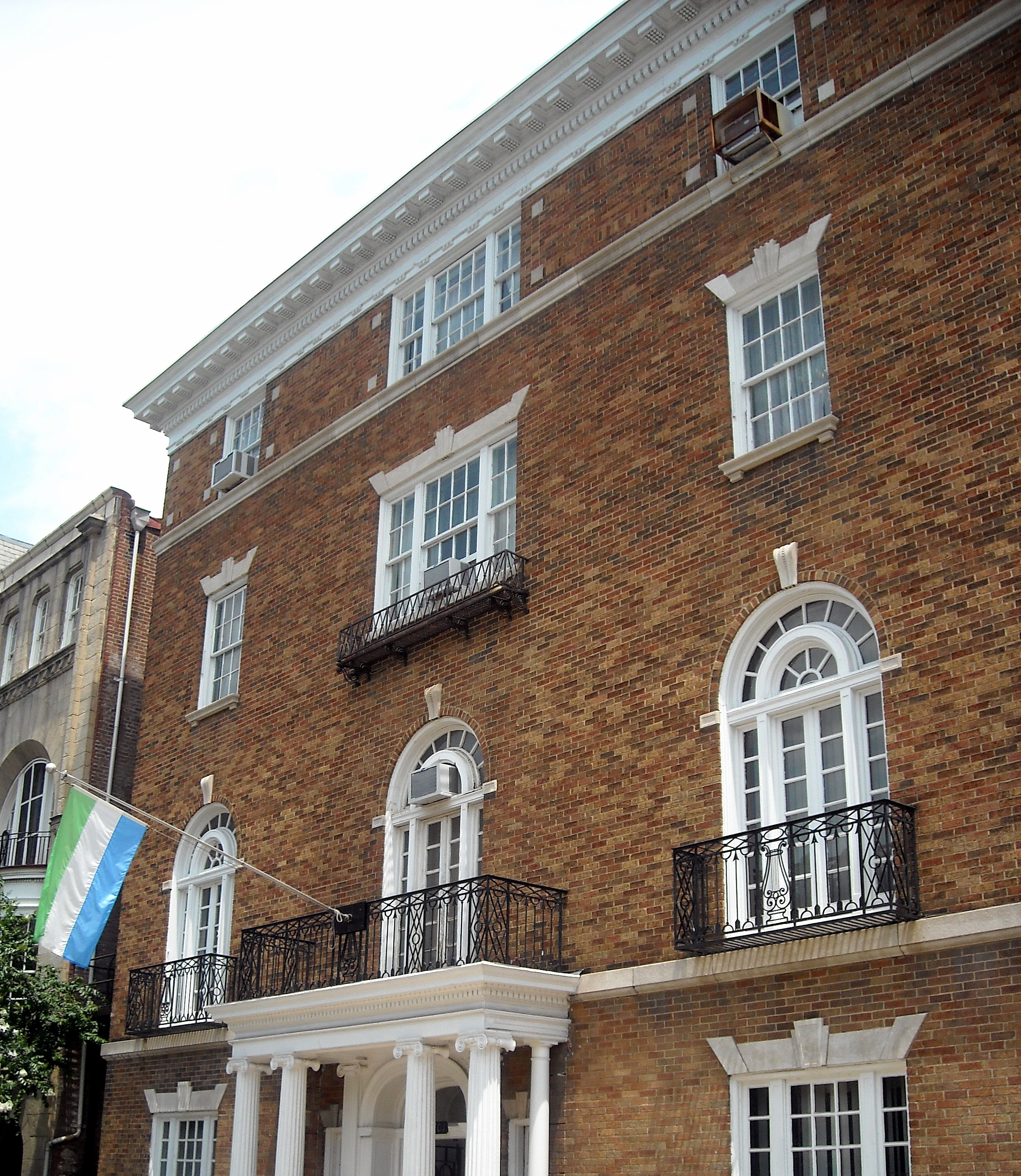
Flag at the embassy in Washington, DC

The national flag of Sierra Leone is a tricolour consisting of three horizontal green, white and blue bands. It was adopted in 1961, Sierra Leone's independence year, to replace the British Blue Ensign defaced with the arms of the Crown Colony of Sierra Leone.

== History ==
British traders and slavers were active along the coast of what is now modern-day Sierra Leone for centuries. They first attempted a permanent settlement in 1787, when philanthropists and abolitionists acquired 52 square kilometres (20 sq mi) of land situated close to Bunce Island for freed slaves. The site of the settlement is where Freetown is now located. It became a crown colony of the United Kingdom within its colonial empire in 1808, Colony of Sierra Leone. Under colonial rule, Sierra Leone used the British Blue Ensign and defaced it with the arms of the territory. The emblem of Sierra Leone at the time consisted of a circle depicting an elephant, an oil palm tree and mountains, along with the letters "S.L." standing for the initials of the territory's name. Other than the initials, the rest of the emblem's design was identical to the colonial arms of the Gold Coast, The Gambia and the Lagos Colony. Sierra Leone was granted its own unique coat of arms in 1914, and the emblem on the Blue Ensign was modified to reflect this change.

In 1960, the College of Arms formulated and then approved of a new flag and coat of arms for Sierra Leone, in anticipation of the colony's independence the following year. The arms was designed first, and its predominant colours of green, white, and blue were subsequently used in the creation of the flag. It was first hoisted at midnight on 27 April 1961, the day Sierra Leone became an independent country. Two years later, the government passed a law making it illegal to "insult" the country's flag, along with the flags of "friendly" nations.

== Design ==
| (1961–present) | Green | White | Blue |
|---|---|---|---|
| RGB | 30-181-58 | 255-255-255 | 0-114-198 |
| Web colors | #1EB53A | #FFFFFF | #0072C6 |

The colours of the flag carry cultural, political, and regional meanings. The green alludes to the country's natural resources – specifically agriculture and its mountains. – while the white epitomizes "unity and justice". The blue evokes the "natural harbour" of Freetown, the capital city of Sierra Leone, as well as the hope of "contributing to world peace" through its usage.

The flag is very similar to that of the official flag of Galápagos Province, Ecuador. The difference between the flags are very insignificant, with Sierra Leone's one having a lighter blue and green than that of the Galápagos Province.

It is also very similar to the "Erne flag" used by ships on the Shannon–Erne Waterway in Ireland, except that that flag uses deeper shades of green and blue.

== Legal issues ==
The Sierra Leonean flag is utilized as a flag of convenience by foreign merchant vessels. The "minimum enforcement" of admiralty law on such vessels has led to illegal and suspicious activity. This includes unlawful fishing, as well as the usage of the flag on vessels from countries under United Nations sanctions.

As a result, the Sierra Leonean government has taken measures to curtail registrations related to the practice of flags of convenience. In 2010, they stopped allowing fishing vessels to register in order to stymie unauthorized catches within both its domestic waters and in international seas. Two years later, they removed 10 ships from its registry believed to be from Iran. This followed the seizure of a ship in Lebanon that was carrying weapons for Syria and was purportedly flying the flag of Sierra Leone.

In 2015, following the establishment of their International Ship Registry (SLMARAD) which developed various mechanisms, such as due diligence procedure, FSIs and others, and through the ratification of major IMO and ILO Conventions and implementation of such in their Domestic law, the Sierra Leonean government managed to successfully eliminate such incidents.

== Historical flags ==
| Flag | Duration | Use | Description |
|---|---|---|---|
| | 1889–1916 | Flag of the Sierra Leone Colony and Protectorate | A British Blue Ensign defaced with the arms of the territory. Identical to the flags of the Gold Coast, The Gambia and the Lagos Colony except for the initials on the emblem. |
| | 1889–1916 | Flag of the governor of Sierra Leone | The Union Jack defaced in the centre with the arms of the territory surrounded by a laurel wreath. |
| | 1916–1961 | Flag of the Sierra Leone Colony and Protectorate | A British Blue Ensign defaced with the arms of the crown colony. This consisted of the old Union Jack at the middle chief, (Note: The design used before the formation of the United Kingdom of Great Britain and Ireland in 1801.) an oil palm tree at the sinister base, and an African person watching a ship arrive in the harbour. |
| | 1916–1961 | Flag of the governor of Sierra Leone | The Union Jack defaced in the centre with the arms of the territory surrounded by a laurel wreath. |
| | 1961–1971 | Queen Elizabeth II's Personal Flag for Sierra Leone | One of Queen Elizabeth II's personal flags. It features the coat of arms of Sierra Leone in banner form. This flag was used when she was Queen of Sierra Leone until it was made redundant by the introduction of a republican form of government in 1971. |
| | 1961–1971 | Standard of the governor-general of Sierra Leone | Flag of the governor-general of Sierra Leone. This flag was made redundant by the introduction of a republican form of government in 1971. |
