= List of flag bearers for Sierra Leone at the Olympics =

Sierra Leone at the Olympics
- IOC code: SLE
- NOC: National Olympic Committee of Sierra Leone
- Website: www.nocsl.org
- Medals: Gold 0 Silver 0 Bronze 0 Total 0

Summer appearances
- 1968; 1972–1976; 1980; 1984; 1988; 1992; 1996; 2000; 2004; 2008; 2012; 2016; 2020; 2024

This is a list of flag bearers who have represented Sierra Leone at the Olympics.

Flag bearers carry the national flag of their country at the opening ceremony of the Olympic Games.

#	Event year	Season	Flag bearer	Sport
1	1968	Summer	John Coker	Boxing
2	1980	Summer		
3	1984	Summer	David Sawyerr	Athletics
4	1988	Summer	Baba Ibrahim Suma-Keita	Athletics
5	1992	Summer		
6	1996	Summer	Eunice Barber	Athletics
7	2000	Summer	Ekundayo Williams	Athletics
8	2004	Summer	Hawanatu Bangura	Athletics
9	2008	Summer	Solomon Bayoh	Athletics
10	2012	Summer	Ola Sesay	Athletics
11	2016	Summer	Bunturabie Jalloh	Swimming
12	2020	Summer	Maggie Barrie	Athletics
12	2020	Summer	Frederick Harris	Judo
13	2024	Summer	Mariama Koroma	Judo
13	2024	Summer	Joshua Wyse	Swimming

== See also ==
- Sierra Leone at the Olympics
