= Sierra Leone at the 1996 Summer Olympics =

- IOC code: SLE
- NOC: National Olympic Committee of Sierra Leone
- Website: www.nocsl.org

in Atlanta
- Competitors: 14 in 3 sports
- Flag bearer: Eunice Barber
- Medals: Gold 0 Silver 0 Bronze 0 Total 0

Summer Olympics appearances (overview)
- 1968; 1972–1976; 1980; 1984; 1988; 1992; 1996; 2000; 2004; 2008; 2012; 2016; 2020; 2024

Sierra Leona was represented at the 1996 Summer Olympics in Atlanta, Georgia, United States by the National Olympic Committee of Sierra Leone.

In total, 14 athletes including 10 men and four women represented Sierra Leone in three different sports including athletics, boxing and swimming.

== Background ==
The National Olympic Committee of Sierra Leone was formed in 1964 and recognised by the International Olympic Committee (IOC) a few days later. Sierra Leone made their Olympic debut at the 1968 Summer Olympics in Mexico City, Mexico. They would not appear at an Olympics again until the 1980 Summer Olympics in Moscow, Russian Soviet Federative Socialist Republic, Soviet Union. They began regularly contesting the Summe Olympics after 1980. The 1996 Summer Olympics in Atlanta, Georgia, United States marked their sixth appearance at the Summer Olympics.

== Competitors ==
In total, 14 athletes represented Sierra Leone at the 1996 Summer Olympics in Atlanta, Georgia, United States across three different sports.

Sport	Men	Women	Total
Athletics	8	4	12
Boxing	1	–	1
Swimming	1	0	1
Total	10	4	14

== Athletics ==
In total, 12 Sierra Leonean athletes participated in the athletics events – Sanusi Turay in the men's 100 m and the men's 4 x 100 m relay, Pierre Lisk in the men's 200 m and the men's 4 x 100 m relay, Tom Ganda and Josephus Thomas in the men's 4 x 100 m relay, Prince Amara, Haroun Korjie, Foday Sillah and Frank Turay in the men's 4 x 400 m relay, Melrose Mansaray in the women's 400 m and the women's 4 × 100 m relay, Sama Fornah and Sia Kamanor in the women's 4 × 100 m relay and Eunice Barber in the women's long jump, the women's 4 × 100 m relay and the heptathlon.

Men

Athletes	Events	Heat Round 1		Heat Round 2		Semifinal		Final	
Athletes	Events	Time	Rank	Time	Rank	Time	Rank	Time	Rank
Sanusi Turay	100 metres	10.39	42	Did not advance					
Pierre Lisk	200 metres	20.86	42	Did not advance					
Tom Ganda; Pierre Lisk; Josephus Thomas; Sanusi Turay	4 x 100 metres relay	38.98	7 q	N/A		38.91	9	Did not advance	
Prince Amara; Haroun Korjie; Foday Sillah; Frank Turay	4 x 400 metres relay	3:11.65	22	N/A		Did not advance			

Women
Track and road events

Athletes	Events	Heat Round 1		Heat Round 2		Semifinal		Final	
Athletes	Events	Time	Rank	Time	Rank	Time	Rank	Time	Rank
Melrose Mansaray	400 metres	54.37	43	Did not advance					
Eunice Barber; Sama Fornah; Sia Kamanor; Melrose Mansaray	4 x 100 metres relay	Disqualified		N/A				Did not advance	

Field events

Athlete	Event	Qualification		Final	
Athlete	Event	Result	Rank	Result	Rank
Eunice Barber	Long jump	6.45	19	Did not advance	

Combined events – Heptathlon

Athlete	Event	100H	HJ	SP	200 m	LJ	JT	800 m	Final	Rank
Eunice Barber	Result	13.50	1.77	12.87	24.67	6.57	45.26	2:13.27	6342	5
Eunice Barber	Points	1050	941	719	917	1030	768	917	6342	5

== Boxing ==
In total, one Sierra Leonean athlete participated in the boxing events – David Kowah in the light heavyweight category.

Athlete	Event	Round of 32	Round of 16	Quarterfinal	Semifinal	Final
Athlete	Event	Opposition Result	Opposition Result	Opposition Result	Opposition Result	Opposition Result
David Kowah	Light heavyweight	bye	Tarver (USA); L RSC	Did not advance		

== Swimming ==
In total, one Sierra Leonean athlete participated in the swimming events – Michael Collier in the men's 50 m freestyle.

Athletes	Events	Heat		Finals	
Athletes	Events	Time	Rank	Time	Rank
Michael Collier	50 m freestyle	34.21	63	Did not advance	
