= List of Sierra Leonean records in athletics =

The following are the national records in athletics in Sierra Leone maintained by its national athletics federation: Sierra Leone Amateur Athletic Association (SLAAA).

== Outdoor ==
Key to tables: Awaiting ratification Record not kept by SLAAA Not ratified or later rescinded by SLAAA

=== Men ===
Event	Record	Athlete	Date	Meet	Place	Ref.
100 m	10.09 (+1.9 m/s)	Gibrilla Pato Bangura	29 July 2009		Loughborough, United Kingdom	
200 m	20.75 (+1.4 m/s)	Josephus Thomas	16 August 1997		London, United Kingdom	
400 m	46.04	Felix Sandy	9 April 1988		Fresno, United States	
800 m	1:51.23	Prince Amara	9 July 1995		Cwmbran, United Kingdom	
1500 m	3:52.29	Victor Sesay	11 January 1973	All-Africa Games	Lagos, Nigeria	
3000 m	8:52.24	Darrel Gooding	12 April 2014	TCNJ Invitational	Ewing, United States	
5000 m	14:20.9	Hilton Gooding	22 March 1985		Freetown, Sierra Leone	
10,000 m	31:06.29	Alifu Massaquoi	18 July 1970	British Commonwealth Games	Edinburgh, United Kingdom	
15 km (road)	51:15+	Idrissa Kargbo	13 April 2014	London Marathon	London, United Kingdom	
20 km (road)	1:08:38+	Idrissa Kargbo	13 April 2014	London Marathon	London, United Kingdom	
Half marathon	1:11:26	Mickael Motori Charles	11 March 2007	Paris Half Marathon	Paris, France	
25 km (road)	1:25:11+ (Note: by official result source; 1:25:58 by other sources)	Idrissa Kargbo	13 April 2014	London Marathon	London, United Kingdom	
30 km (road)	1:43:28+ (Note: by official result source; 1:44:15 by other sources)	Idrissa Kargbo	13 April 2014	London Marathon	London, United Kingdom	
Marathon	2:32:52 (Note: by official result source; 2:33:38 by World Athletics source)	Idrissa Kargbo	13 April 2014	London Marathon	London, United Kingdom	
110 m hurdles	14.06 (+1.1 m/s)	Benjamin Grant	25 May 1992		Corby, United Kingdom	
400 m hurdles	52.18 (Note: at the 1988 Olympics, Grant was credited with 51.73 - actually this was only 52.73)	Benjamin Grant	31 May 1992		Birmingham, United Kingdom	
3000 m steeplechase	9:15.61	Modupeh Jonah	1 November 1989		Kuwait City, Kuwait	
High jump	2.07 m	Quintin Saliah Konteh	24 December 1999		Freetown, Sierra Leone	
Pole vault	3.60 m	Sam Sillah	19 September 2009	British Athletics League Qualifier	Abingdon, United Kingdom	
Pole vault	3.60 m	Sam Sillah	8 June 2013		Abingdon, United Kingdom	
Pole vault	3.60 m	Sam Sillah	6 July 2013		Kingston, United Kingdom	
Long jump	7.84 m NWI	Thomas Ganda	9 May 1992		London, United Kingdom	
Triple jump	15.81 m (+0.5 m/s)	Osman Cline-Thomas	29 August 1995	Universiade	Fukuoka, Japan	
Shot put	16.01 m	Tony Soalla-Bell	30 July 2002	Commonwealth Games	Manchester, United Kingdom	
Discus throw	44.75 m	Tony Soalla-Bell	26 July 2002	Commonwealth Games	Manchester, United Kingdom	
Hammer throw	57.14 m	Kenya Sei	17 April 2026	Georgia Tech Invitational	Atlanta, United States	
Hammer throw	58.87 m	Kenya Sei	10 May 2024	West Georgia vs Life U Throws	Marietta, United States	
Hammer throw	60.92 m	Kenya Sei	27 March 2026	Emory Thrills in the Hills	Atlanta, United States	
Javelin throw	49.60 m	Alfred Sesay	26 December 1991		Freetown, Sierra Leone	
Decathlon	6288 pts	Sam Sillah	27–28 September 2008		Bedford, United Kingdom	
Decathlon	100m / Long jump / Shot put / High jump / 400m / 110m H / Discus / Pole vault / Javelin / 1500m; 11.28 / 6.70 m / 10.35 m / 1.97 m / 53.53 / 15.56 / 30.07 m / 3.40 m / 46.36 m / 4:59.36					
20 km walk (road)						
50 km walk (road)						
4 × 100 m relay	38.91	Sierra Leone; Pierre Lisk; Tom Ganda; Josephus Thomas; Sanusi Turay	2 August 1996	Olympic Games	Atlanta, United States	
4 × 400 m relay	3:10.47	Sierra Leone; Horace Dove-Edwin; Felix Sandy; Benjamin Grant; David Sawyer	30 September 1988	Olympic Games	Seoul, South Korea	

=== Women ===
Event	Record	Athlete	Date	Meet	Place	Ref.
100 m	11.40 (+1.0 m/s)	Maggie Barrie	6 July 2019		Montverde, United States	
200 m	23.27 (+0.4 m/s)	Maggie Barrie	21 April 2018	Jessie Owens Track Classic	Columbus, United States	
400 m	51.36	Maggie Barrie	13 May 2018	Big Ten Championships	Bloomington, United States	
800 m	2:07.53	Agness Mansaray	29 May 2016		Shippensburg, United States	
1500 m	4:46.03	Melrose Mansaray	11 August 1990	World Junior Championships	Plovdiv, Bulgaria	
3000 m	10:10.9 h	Hannah Bantamoi	26 December 1981		Freetown, Sierra Leone	
5000 m						
10,000 m						
10 km (road)	36:14+	Mamie Konneh-Lahun	13 April 2014	London Marathon	London, United Kingdom	
15 km (road)	54:54+	Mamie Konneh-Lahun	13 April 2014	London Marathon	London, United Kingdom	
20 km (road)	1:14:34+	Mamie Konneh-Lahun	13 April 2014	London Marathon	London, United Kingdom	
Half marathon	1:19:03+	Mamie Konneh-Lahun	13 April 2014	London Marathon	London, United Kingdom	
25 km (road)	1:34:47+	Mamie Konneh-Lahun	13 April 2014	London Marathon	London, United Kingdom	
30 km (road)	1:55:07+	Mamie Konneh-Lahun	13 April 2014	London Marathon	London, United Kingdom	
Marathon	2:46:20	Mamie Konneh-Lahun	13 April 2014	London Marathon	London, United Kingdom	
100 m hurdles	13.38	Eunice Barber	14 September 1996		Talence, France	
400 m hurdles	57.84	Aisha Naibe-Wey	15 May 2016	ACC Championships	Chapel Hill, United States	
400 m hurdles	57.26 (Note: before Aisha Naibe-Wey opted for Sierra Leone)	Aisha Naibe-Wey	25 May 2015		Lokeren, Belgium	
3000 m steeplechase						
High jump	1.83 m	Eunice Barber (Note: Eunice Barber transferred to France in 1999)	1 May 1997		Lamballe, France	
Pole vault						
Long jump	6.75 m (+1.0 m/s)	Eunice Barber	5 June 1998		Pierre-Bénite, France	
Triple jump						
Shot put	12.87 m	Eunice Barber	27 July 1996	Olympic Games	Atlanta, United States	
Discus throw	33.45 m	Onike Jones	1966		Freetown, Sierra Leone	
Hammer throw						
Javelin throw						
Heptathlon	6416 pts	Eunice Barber (Note: Eunice Barber transferred to France in 1999)	14-15 September 1996		Talence, France	
Heptathlon	100m H / High jump / Shot put / 200m / Long jump / Javelin / 800m; 13.38 (+0.8 m/s) / 1.79 m / 12.23 m / 24.75 (+0.6 m/s) / 6.48 m (−0.2 m/s) / 49.92 m / 2:11.94					
20 km walk (road)						
50 km walk (road)						
4 × 100 m relay	47.45	Sierra Leone; Fatmata Bash-Koroma; Ekundayo Williams; Tennah Kargbo; Aminata Kargbo	31 July 2002	Commonwealth Games	Manchester, United Kingdom	
4 × 400 m relay	3:57.20	Sierra Leone; Sarah Bona; Fatmata Bash-Koroma; Fatoumata Camara ?	12 May 2001		Bakau, The Gambia	

=== Mixed ===
Event	Record	Athlete	Date	Meet	Place	Ref.
4 × 400 m relay	3:24.79	Sierra Leone; Mohamed B. Bah; Marie Bangura; Derek Kargbo; Georgiana Sesay	19 March 2024	African Games	Accra, Ghana	

== Indoor ==
=== Men ===
Event	Record	Athlete	Date	Meet	Place	Ref.
60 m	6.65	Ibrahim Kabia	13 March 2010	World Championships	Doha, Qatar	
200 m	21.43	Foday Sillah	21 February 1993		Liévin, France	
200 m	21.31	Franklyn Akabi-During (Note: citizenship unclear; US by World Athletics)	13 March 2026	NCAA Division III Championships	Birmingham, United States	
400 m	53.48	Rashid Moiwa	1 March 2024	World Championships	Glasgow, United Kingdom	
800 m	2:00.67	Salieu Jalloh	7 February 2015		Ghent, Belgium	
1000 m	2:33.92	Darrel Gooding	22 January 2016	NYC Gotham Cup	Staten Island, United States	
1500 m						
Mile	4:20.34	Darrel Gooding	30 January 2014	Metropolitan Championships	New York City, United States	
3000 m	8:34.04 (Note: outdoor mark ratified as absolute record)	Darrel Gooding	30 January 2016	John Thomas Terrier Invitational	Boston, United States	
60 m hurdles	7.90	Benjamin Grant	9 January 1993		Birmingham, United Kingdom	
60 m hurdles	7.79 (Note: citizenship unclear, American by World Athletics)	Moses Koroma	15 February 2025	10th Annual Russ Jewett Indoor Gorilla Classic	Pittsburg, United States	
High jump						
Pole vault						
Long jump	7.41 m	Thomas Ganda	16 February 1992	AVIVA Indoor Grand Prix	Birmingham, United Kingdom	
Triple jump
Triple jump	15.15 m	Francis Keita	February 1991		London, United Kingdom	
Shot put	15.51 m	Tony Soalla-Bell	7 February 2004		Sheffield, United Kingdom	
Weight throw	18.49 m	Kenya Sei (Note: eligibility unclear, US citizenship by World Athletics source)	24/25 February 2024	UAA Indoor Championships	New York, United States	
Heptathlon						
Heptathlon	60m / Long jump / Shot put / High jump / 60m H / Pole vault / 1000m					
5000 m walk						
4 × 400 m relay						

=== Women ===
Event	Record	Athlete	Date	Meet	Place	Ref.
60 m	7.48	Ngozi Musa	22 January 2016		Lexington, United States	
60 m	7.32	Fatmata Bangura	30 January 2010	London Games	London, United Kingdom	
200 m	23.83	Maggie Barrie	26 February 2016	Big 10 Championships	Geneva, United States	
300 m	38.17	Maggie Barrie	17 February 2017	Ohio State College/University Tune-up Invitational	Columbus, United States	
400 m	55.15	Maggie Barrie	16 January 2016	Kentucky Invitational	Lexington, United States	
800 m	2:17.60	Eunice Barber (Note: Eunice Barber transferred to France in 1999)	25 February 1996		Nogent-sur-Oise, France	
1500 m						
3000 m						
60 m hurdles	8.32	Eunice Barber (Note: Eunice Barber transferred to France in 1999)	9 January 1997		Liévin, France	
High jump	1.80 m	Eunice Barber (Note: Eunice Barber transferred to France in 1999)	7 March 1997	World Championships	Paris, France	
Pole vault						
Long jump	6.86 m (Note: outdoor mark ratified as absolute record)	Eunice Barber (Note: Eunice Barber transferred to France in 1999)	15 February 1998		Bordeaux, France	
Triple jump						
Shot put	13.05 m (Note: outdoor mark ratified as absolute record)	Eunice Barber (Note: Eunice Barber transferred to France in 1999)	7 March 1997	World Championships	Paris, France	
Pentathlon	4558 pts	Eunice Barber (Note: Eunice Barber transferred to France in 1999)	7 March 1997	World Championships	Paris, France	
Pentathlon	60m H / High jump / Shot put / Long jump / 800m; 8.39 / 1.80 m / 13.05 m / 6.35 m / 2:18.17					
3000 m walk						
4 × 400 m relay						
