= Sierra Leone at the 1988 Summer Olympics =

- IOC code: SLE
- NOC: National Olympic Committee of Sierra Leone

in Seoul
- Competitors: 12 (11 men, 1 woman) in 4 sports
- Flag bearer: Baba Ibrahim Suma-Keita
- Medals: Gold 0 Silver 0 Bronze 0 Total 0

Summer Olympics appearances (overview)
- 1968; 1972–1976; 1980; 1984; 1988; 1992; 1996; 2000; 2004; 2008; 2012; 2016; 2020; 2024

Sierra Leone competed at the 1988 Summer Olympics in Seoul, South Korea. Twelve competitors, eleven men and one woman, took part in fourteen events in four sports.

== Competitors ==
The following is the list of number of competitors in the Games.

Sport	Men	Women	Total
Athletics	7	1	8
Boxing	2	–	2
Cycling	1	0	1
Weightlifting	1	–	1
Total	11	1	12

== Athletics ==
Men
Track and road events

Athlete	Event	Heat Round 1		Heat Round 2		Semifinal		Final	
Athlete	Event	Time	Rank	Time	Rank	Time	Rank	Time	Rank
Horace Dove-Edwin	100 metres	10.89	76	Did not advance					
Felix Sandy	400 metres	46.82	37	Did not advance					
David Sawyerr	800 metres	1:57.88	64	Did not advance					
Modupe Jonah	1500 metres	3:55.15	51	—		Did not advance			
Baba Ibrahim Suma-Keita	Marathon	—						3:04:00	95
Benjamin Grant	400 metres hurdles	51.73	30	—		Did not advance			
Francis Keita; Horace Dove-Edwin; Benjamin Grant; Felix Sandy	4 × 100 metres relay	41.19	21	—		Did not advance			
Horace Dove-Edwin; Felix Sandy; Benjamin Grant; David Sawyerr	4 × 400 metres relay	3:10.47	17	—		Did not advance			

Field events

Athlete	Event	Qualification		Final	
Athlete	Event	Distance	Position	Distance	Position
Francis Keita	Long jump	6.87	33	Did not advance	

Women
Track and road events

Athlete	Event	Heat Round 1		Heat Round 2		Semifinal		Final	
Athlete	Event	Time	Rank	Time	Rank	Time	Rank	Time	Rank
Rachel Thompson	1500 metres	5:31.42	28	—				Did not advance	

== Boxing ==
Athlete	Event	Round of 64	Round of 32	Round of 16	Quarterfinals	Semifinals	Final	
Athlete	Event	Opposition Result	Opposition Result	Opposition Result	Opposition Result	Opposition Result	Opposition Result	Rank
Desmond Williams	Light middleweight	Bye	Woodhall (GBR); L 0–5	Did not advance				
Samuel Simbo	Middleweight	Bye	Taramov (URS); L KO	Did not advance				

== Cycling ==
One male cyclist represented Sierra Leone in 1988.

=== Road ===
Men

Athlete	Event	Time	Rank
Frank Williams	Road race	DNF	

== Weightlifting ==
Athlete	Event	Snatch		Clean & jerk		Total	Rank
Athlete	Event	Result	Rank	Result	Rank	Total	Rank
Percy Doherty	82.5 kg	65.0	21	100.0	19	165.0	19
