= Sierra Leone at the 1984 Summer Olympics =

- IOC code: SLE
- NOC: National Olympic Committee of Sierra Leone

in Los Angeles
- Competitors: 7
- Flag bearer: David Sawyerr
- Medals: Gold 0 Silver 0 Bronze 0 Total 0

Summer Olympics appearances (overview)
- 1968; 1972–1976; 1980; 1984; 1988; 1992; 1996; 2000; 2004; 2008; 2012; 2016; 2020; 2024

Sierra Leone competed at the 1984 Summer Olympics in Los Angeles, United States.

== Results by event ==
=== Athletics ===
Women's 100 metres

- Eugenia Osho-Williams

- First Heat — 12.83s (→ did not advance)

Men's 100 metres

- Ivan Benjamin

- First Heat – 11.13s (→ did not advance)

Men's 200 metres

- David Sawyerr

- First Heat – 21.29s (→ did not advance)

- Ivan Benjamin

- First Heat – 21.54s (→ did not advance)

Men's 4x400 metres relay

- Abdul Mansaray, David Sawyerr, Felix Sandy, and Ivan Benjamin

- First Heat – 40.77 (→ did not advance)

== Boxing ==
Men's Light Middleweight (– 71 kg)

- Israel Cole

- First Round – Bye
- Second Round – Defeated Victor Claudio (PUR), RSC-1
- Third Round – Defeated Elone Lutui (TNG), RSCH-2
- Quarterfinals – Lost to Christophe Tiozzo (FRA), 0:5

Men's Heavyweight (– 91 kg)

- Egerton Forster

- First Round – Bye
- Second Round – Lost to Arnold Vanderlyde (NED), 1:4
