= Sierra Leone at the 1992 Summer Olympics =

- IOC code: SLE
- NOC: National Olympic Committee of Sierra Leone

in Barcelona
- Competitors: 11 in 1 sport
- Medals: Gold 0 Silver 0 Bronze 0 Total 0

Summer Olympics appearances (overview)
- 1968; 1972–1976; 1980; 1984; 1988; 1992; 1996; 2000; 2004; 2008; 2012; 2016; 2020; 2024

Sierra Leone competed at the 1992 Summer Olympics in Barcelona, Spain.

== Competitors ==
The following is the list of number of competitors in the Games.

Sport	Men	Women	Total
Athletics	9	2	11
Total	9	2	11

== Athletics ==
Men
Track and road events

Athlete	Event	Heats		Quarterfinal		Semifinal		Final	
Athlete	Event	Result	Rank	Result	Rank	Result	Rank	Result	Rank
Sanusi Turay	100 metres	10.58	25 Q	10.40	19	Did not advance			
Horace Dove-Edwin	200 metres	21.38	39 q	21.80	39	Did not advance			
Foday Sillah	400 metres	47.00	42	Did not advance					
Prince Amara	800 metres	1:51.76	43	—		Did not advance			
Benjamin Grant	110 metres hurdles	14.27	32	Did not advance					
Francis Keita; Denton Guy-Williams; Paul Parkinson; Sanusi Turay	4 × 100 metres relay	40.11	15 Q	—		40.46	14	Did not advance	

Field events

Athlete	Event	Qualification		Final	
Athlete	Event	Distance	Position	Distance	Position
Tom Ganda	Long jump	7.67	27	Did not advance	

Women
Track and road events

Athlete	Event	Heats		Quarterfinal		Semifinal		Final	
Athlete	Event	Result	Rank	Result	Rank	Result	Rank	Result	Rank
Melrose Mansaray	200 metres	24.67	42	Did not advance					
Melrose Mansaray	400 metres	55.67	37	Did not advance					
Eunice Barber	100 metres hurdles	15.01	35	Did not advance					

Field events

Athlete	Event	Qualification		Final	
Athlete	Event	Distance	Position	Distance	Position
Eunice Barber	Long jump	5.55	29	Did not advance	

Combined event – Heptathlon

Athlete	Event	100H	HJ	SP	200 m	LJ	JT	800 m	Total	Rank
Eunice Barber	Result	14.79	1.55	10.71	25.66	5.76	NM	2:21.59	4530	26
Eunice Barber	Points	870	678	576	827	777	0	802	4530	26

== Sources ==
- Official Olympic Reports
