= Sierra Leone at the 1980 Summer Olympics =

- IOC code: SLE
- NOC: National Olympic Committee of Sierra Leone

in Moscow
- Competitors: 14 in 2 sports
- Medals: Gold 0 Silver 0 Bronze 0 Total 0

Summer Olympics appearances (overview)
- 1968; 1972–1976; 1980; 1984; 1988; 1992; 1996; 2000; 2004; 2008; 2012; 2016; 2020; 2024

Sierra Leone competed at the 1980 Summer Olympics in Moscow, USSR.

== Results by event ==
=== Athletics ===
Men's 100 metres

- Sheku Boima

- Heat — 11.08 (→ did not advance)

- John Carew

- Heat — 11.11 (→ did not advance)

- Rudolph George

- Heat — 11.37 (→ did not advance)

Men's 200 metres

- Sheku Boima

- Heat — 22.93 (→ did not advance)

- Walter During

- Heat — 23.12 (→ did not advance)

- Rudolph George

- Heat — 23.30 (→ did not advance)

Men's 800 metres

- George Branche

- Heat — 1:54.6 (→ did not advance)

- Sahr Kendor

- Heat — 2:06.5 (→ did not advance)

- Jimmy Massallay

- Heat — 2:04.4 (→ did not advance)

Men's 1,500 metres

- George Branche

- Heat — 4:03.9 (→ did not advance)

Men's Marathon

- Baba Ibrahim Suma-Keita

- Final — 2:41:20 (→ 46th place)

Men's 4x400 metres Relay

- William Akabi-Davis, Jimmy Massallay, Sahr Kendor, and George Branche

- Heat — 3:25.0 (→ did not advance)

Men's Decathlon

- Columba Blango

- Final — 5080 points (→ 16th place)

Women's 100 metres

- Eugenia Osho-Williams

- Heat — 12.95 (→ did not advance)

- Estella Meheux

- Heat — 13.22 (→ did not advance)

Women's 800 metres

- Eugenia Osho-Williams

- Heat — 2:33.4 (→ did not advance)

Women's 100 m Hurdles

- Estella Meheux

- Heat — 15.61 (→ did not advance)

Women's Long Jump

- Estella Meheux

- Qualifying Round — did not start (→ did not advance, no ranking)

=== Boxing ===
Men's Lightweight (60 kg)

- Mohamed Bangura

- First Round — Lost to Viktor Demyanenko (Soviet Union) after disqualification in second round
