= Sierra Leone at the 1968 Summer Olympics =

- IOC code: SLE (SLA used at these Games)
- NOC: National Olympic Committee of Sierra Leone

in Mexico City
- Competitors: 3 in 2 sports
- Flag bearer: John Coker
- Medals: Gold 0 Silver 0 Bronze 0 Total 0

Summer Olympics appearances (overview)
- 1968; 1972–1976; 1980; 1984; 1988; 1992; 1996; 2000; 2004; 2008; 2012; 2016; 2020; 2024

Sierra Leone competed in the Summer Olympic Games for the first time at the 1968 Summer Olympics in Mexico City, Mexico.

== Athletics ==
Men

Athlete	Event	Heat		Semi Final		Final	
Athlete	Event	Result	Rank	Result	Rank	Result	Rank
Alifu Massaquoi	10000 m	—				did not finish	
Alifu Massaquoi	Marathon	—				2:52:28	45

Field events

Athlete	Event	Qualification		Final	
Athlete	Event	Distance	Position	Distance	Position
Marconi Turay	High jump	1.90	39	did not advance	

Key

- Note–Ranks given for track events are within the athlete's heat only
- Q = Qualified for the next round
- q = Qualified for the next round as a fastest loser or, in field events, by position without achieving the qualifying target
- NR = National record
- N/A = Round not applicable for the event
- Bye = Athlete not required to compete in round

== Boxing ==
Men

Athlete	Event	1 Round	2 Round	3 Round	Quarterfinals	Semifinals	Final
Athlete	Event	Opposition Result	Opposition Result	Opposition Result	Opposition Result	Opposition Result	Rank
John Coker	Heavyweight	Ion Alexe (ROU); L 0-5	did not advance				
