= Athletics at the 1996 Summer Olympics – Women's 4 × 100 metres relay =

Official Video Highlights @ 1:31:00

These are the official results of the Women's 4 × 100 m Relay event at the 1996 Summer Olympics in Atlanta, Georgia. There were 22 nations competing.

== Medalists ==
Gold	Silver	Bronze
United States; Chryste Gaines; Gail Devers; Inger Miller; Gwen Torrence; Carlette Guidry*	Bahamas; Eldece Clarke; Chandra Sturrup; Savatheda Fynes; Pauline Davis; Debbie Ferguson*	Jamaica; Michelle Freeman; Juliet Cuthbert; Nikole Mitchell; Merlene Ottey; Gillian Russell*; Andria Lloyd*

* Athletes who participated in the heats only and received medals.

== Results ==
=== Heats ===
Qualification: First 2 in each heat (Q) and the next 2 fastest (q) qualified to the final.

Rank	Heat	Nation	Athletes	Time	Notes
1	1	United States	Chryste Gaines, Carlette Guidry, Inger Miller, Gwen Torrence	42.49	Q
2	3	Russia	Yekaterina Leshchova, Galina Malchugina, Natalya Pomoshchnikova-Voronova, Irina Privalova	43.00	Q
3	3	France	Sandra Citte, Odiah Sidibe, Delphine Combe, Patricia Girard-Leno	43.09	Q
4	1	Bahamas	Eldece Clarke, Savatheda Fynes, Debbie Ferguson, Pauline Davis	43.14	Q
5	2	Jamaica	Michelle Freeman, Gillian Russell, Nikole Mitchell, Andria Lloyd	43.36	Q
6	2	Nigeria	Chioma Ajunwa, Mary Tombiri-Shirey, Christy Opara-Thompson, Mary Onyali	43.54	Q
7	1	Australia	Sharon Cripps, Kylie Hanigan, Lauren Hewitt, Jodi Lambert	43.75	q
8	2	Great Britain	Angie Thorp, Marcia Richardson, Simmone Jacobs, Katharine Merry	43.88	q
9	1	Colombia	Mirtha Brock, Felipa Palacios, Patricia Rodríguez, Sandra Borrero	44.16	
10	3	Bulgaria	Desislava Dimitrova, Petya Pendareva, Zlatka Georgieva, Monika Gachevska	44.19	
11	3	Finland	Johanna Manninen, Sanna Hernesniemi, Heidi Suomi, Anu Pirttimaa	44.21	
12	1	Cuba	Idalia Hechavarría, Aliuska López, Dainelky Pérez, Liliana Allen	44.32	
13	3	Canada	Katie Anderson, Tara Perry, Ladonna Antoine, Lesley Tashlin	44.34	
14	2	Thailand	Sunisa Kawrungruang, Kwuanfah Inchareon, Savitree Srichure, Supaporn Hubson	45.62	
15	1	Virgin Islands	Maria Noel, Ameerah Bello, Jilma Patrick, Rochelle Thomas	46.09	
	1	Cameroon	Myriam Léonie Mani, Georgette Nkoma, Edwige Abéna Fouda, Sylvie Mballa Eloundou	DNF	
	2	Germany	Andrea Philipp, Silke Lichtenhagen, Melanie Paschke, Silke Knoll	DNF	
	2	Madagascar	Lantoniaina Ramalalanirina, Rivosoa Rakotondrabe, Nicole Ramalalanirina, Lalao Ravaonirina	DNF	
	3	Saint Kitts and Nevis	Bernadeth Prentice, Bernice Morton, Elricia Francis, Valma Bass	DNF	
	1	Antigua and Barbuda	Sonia Williams, Dine Potter, Charmaine Thomas, Heather Samuel	DQ	
	2	Lesotho	Sebongile Sello, M'apotlaki Ts'elho, Nteboheleng Koaeana, Lineo Shoai	DQ	
	3	Sierra Leone	Eunice Barber, Sia Kamanor, Sama Fornah, Melrose Mansaray	DQ	

=== Final ===
Rank	Lane	Nation	Athletes	Time	Notes
1st place, gold medalist(s)	5	United States	Chryste Gaines, Gail Devers, Inger Miller, Gwen Torrence	41.95	
2nd place, silver medalist(s)	2	Bahamas	Eldece Clarke, Chandra Sturrup, Savatheda Fynes, Pauline Davis	42.14	
3rd place, bronze medalist(s)	6	Jamaica	Michelle Freeman, Juliet Cuthbert, Nikole Mitchell, Merlene Ottey	42.24	
4	4	Russia	Yekaterina Leshchova, Galina Malchugina, Natalya Pomoshchnikova-Voronova, Irina Privalova	42.27	
5	7	Nigeria	Chioma Ajunwa, Mary Tombiri-Shirey, Christy Opara-Thompson, Mary Onyali	42.56	
6	3	France	Sandra Citte, Odiah Sidibe, Patricia Girard-Leno, Marie-José Pérec	42.76	
7	8	Australia	Sharon Cripps, Kylie Hanigan, Lauren Hewitt, Jodi Lambert	43.70	
8	1	Great Britain	Angie Thorp, Marcia Richardson, Simmone Jacobs, Katharine Merry	43.93	

== See also ==
- Men's 4 × 100 m Relay
