= Sierra Leone at the 2024 Summer Paralympics =

- IPC code: SLE
- NPC: Association of Sports for the Disabled

in Paris, France August 28, 2024 – September 8, 2024
- Competitors: 1 in 1 sport
- Flag bearer: George Wyndham
- Medals: Gold 0 Silver 0 Bronze 0 Total 0

Summer Paralympics appearances (overview)
- 1996; 2000–2008; 2012; 2016; 2020; 2024

Sierra Leone competed at the 2024 Summer Paralympics in Paris, France, from 28 August to 8 September 2024. This was the nation's fifth time competing at the Summer Paralympic Games after it made its debut at the 1996 Summer Paralympics. The delegation consisted of only one Athlete from one sport.

== Competitors ==
The following is the list of number of competitors in the Games.

Sport	Men	Women	Total
Athletics	1	0	1
Total	1	0	1

== Athletics ==
Athlete	Event	Final	
Athlete	Event	Result	Rank
George Wyndham	Men's javelin throw F57	15.07	11

== See also ==
- Sierra Leone at the 2024 Summer Olympics
- Sierra Leone at the Paralympics
