= Sierra Leone at the 2004 Summer Olympics =

- IOC code: SLE
- NOC: National Olympic Committee of Sierra Leone
- Website: www.nocsl.org

in Athens
- Competitors: 2 in 1 sport
- Flag bearer: Hawanatu Bangura
- Medals: Gold 0 Silver 0 Bronze 0 Total 0

Summer Olympics appearances (overview)
- 1968; 1972–1976; 1980; 1984; 1988; 1992; 1996; 2000; 2004; 2008; 2012; 2016; 2020; 2024

Sierra Leone competed at the 2004 Summer Olympics in Athens, Greece, from 13 to 29 August 2004. This was the nation's eighth appearance at the Summer Olympics since its debut in the 1968 Summer Olympics. The Sierra Leone delegation included two track and field athletes; Lamin Tucker and Hawanatu Bangura, both of whom were sprinters that were selected via winning an event in Freetown, as the nation had no athletes that met the "A" or "B" standards in any event. Bangura was selected as flag bearer for the opening ceremony. Neither of the two athletes progressed beyond the heats.

== Background ==
Sierra Leone participated in eight Summer Olympic games between its debut in the 1968 Summer Olympics in Mexico City, Mexico and the 2004 Summer Olympics in Athens, with the exception of the 1972 Summer Olympics in Munich, and the 1976 Summer Olympics in Montreal, the latter because of a boycott relating to the New Zealand national rugby union team touring South Africa.

The Sierra Leone National Olympic Committee (NOC) selected two athletes via wildcards. Usually, an NOC would be able to enter up to 3 qualified athletes in each individual event as long as each athlete met the "A" standard, or 1 athlete per event if they met the "B" standard. However, since Sierra Leone had no athletes that met either standard, they were allowed to select two athletes, one of each gender, as wildcards. The Sierra Leone NOC decided to host an event in Freetown, where the fastest man and woman in the event would be selected to compete at the Athens Games. The two athletes that won and therefore were selected to compete in the Athens games were Lamin Tucker and Hawanatu Bangura. They competed in the track and field Men's 100 meters and in the Women's 100 meters respectively. Bangura was flag bearer for the opening ceremony.

== Athletics ==
Making his Summer Olympic debut, Lamin Tucker qualified for the Athens Games via winning an event in Freetown. He competed on 21 August in the Men's 100 meters against eight other athletes in the seventh heat. He finished the race in 10.72 seconds, ranking sixth. He ranked ahead of American Samoa's Kelsey Nakanelua (11.25 seconds) and behind Canada's Pierre Browne (10.32 seconds), in a heat led by Jamaica's Asafa Powell (10.06 seconds). Overall, Tucker placed 61st out of the 84 athletes that competed and was 0.38 seconds slower than the slowest athlete that progressed to the next round. Therefore, that was the end of his competition. Competing at her first Summer Olympics, Hawanatu Bangura was notable for holding the Sierra Leone flag at the opening ceremony and for becoming the youngest ever competitor to represent Sierra Leone at the Olympics aged 16, a record that still stands today. She qualified for the Athens Games via winning an event in Freetown. She competed on 20 August in 100 meters in the seventh heat against seven other athletes. She ran a time of 12.11 seconds, finishing seventh. Bangura ranked ahead of Iraq's Alaa Jassim (12.70 seconds) and behind Papua New Guinea's Mae Koime (12.00 seconds), in a heat led by France's Christine Arron and Ghana's Vida Anim (11.14 seconds). Overall, Bangura was 0.68 seconds behind the slowest athlete that progressed to the quarter-finals and therefore she did not advance.

Key

- Note–Ranks given for track events are within the athlete's heat only
- Q = Qualified for the next round
- q = Qualified for the next round as a fastest loser or, in field events, by position without achieving the qualifying target
- NR = National record
- N/A = Round not applicable for the event
- Bye = Athlete not required to compete in round

Men

| Athlete | Event | Heat | | Quarterfinal | | Semifinal | | Final | |
| Athlete | Event | Result | Rank | Result | Rank | Result | Rank | Result | Rank |
|---|---|---|---|---|---|---|---|---|---|
| Lamin Tucker | 100 m | 10.72 | 6 | Did not advance | | | | | |

Women

| Athlete | Event | Heat | | Quarterfinal | | Semifinal | | Final | |
| Athlete | Event | Result | Rank | Result | Rank | Result | Rank | Result | Rank |
|---|---|---|---|---|---|---|---|---|---|
| Hawanatu Bangura | 100 m | 12.11 | 7 | Did not advance | | | | | |
