= Sierra Leone at the 2012 Summer Olympics =

- IOC code: SLE
- NOC: National Olympic Committee of Sierra Leone
- Website: www.nocsl.org

in London
- Competitors: 2 in 1 sport
- Flag bearers: Ola Sesay (opening); Ibrahim Turay (closing)
- Medals: Gold 0 Silver 0 Bronze 0 Total 0

Summer Olympics appearances (overview)
- 1968; 1972–1976; 1980; 1984; 1988; 1992; 1996; 2000; 2004; 2008; 2012; 2016; 2020; 2024

Sierra Leone competed at the 2012 Summer Olympics in London, from 27 July to 12 August 2012. This marked the nation's tenth appearance at the Summer Olympics since its debut in the 1968 Summer Olympics. The Sierra Leone delegation included two track and field athletes; Ibrahim Turay, a sprinter and Ola Sesay, a long jumper. Sesay and Turay were selected as flag bearers for the opening and closing ceremonies respectively. Neither of the two athletes progressed beyond the first round.

== Background ==
Sierra Leone participated in ten Summer Olympic games between its debut in the 1968 Summer Olympics in Mexico City, Mexico and the 2012 Summer Olympics in London, with the exception of the 1972 Summer Olympics in Munich, and the 1976 Summer Olympics in Montreal, the latter because of a boycott relating to the New Zealand national rugby union team touring South Africa. The highest number of Sierra Leonean athletes participating in a summer games is fourteen in the 1980 Summer Olympics in Moscow, Russia and the 1996 Summer Olympics in Atlanta, USA. As of 2015, no Sierra Leonean athlete has ever won a medal at the Olympics. Two athletes from Sierra Leone qualified for the London games; Ibrahim Turay in the track and field 200 m and Ola Sesay in the long jump. They both qualified after meeting the "A" and "B" qualifying standards for their events respectively. Sesay and Turay were flag bearers for the opening and closing ceremonies respectively.

== Athletics ==
The 2012 Summer Games marked Ibrahim Turay's Olympic debut. He qualified for the 200 metres after posting a time of 22.54 seconds in the 2010 Commonwealth Games Men's 200 metres, 0.01 seconds faster than the "A" qualifying standard. He competed on 7 August in heat two, finishing last out of eight athletes, despite achieving a personal best time of 21.90 seconds. He ranked behind Chile's Cristián Reyes (21.29 seconds), in a heat led by France's Christophe Lemaitre (20.34. seconds). Overall he finished 51st out of 55 athletes, (Note: One athlete, Alonso Edward, was disqualified and another, Ben Youssef Meité, did not start.) and was 1.18 seconds slower than the slowest athlete that progressed to the final round and, therefore, that was the end of his competition.

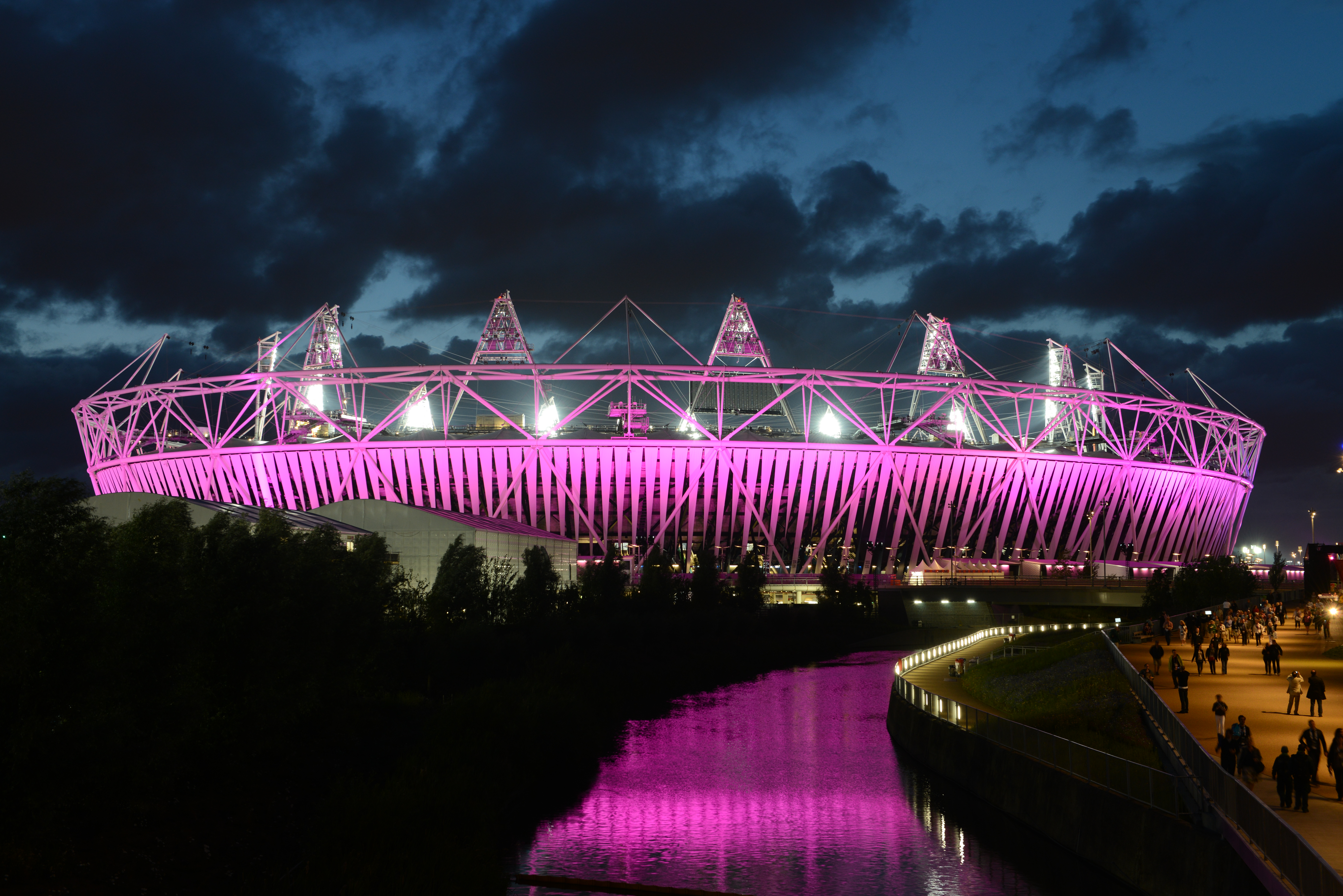
The London Olympic Stadium, where Turay and Sesay competed in track and field events

Competing at her first Olympics, Ola Sesay was notable for carrying the Sierra Leone flag for the opening ceremony. She qualified for the Olympics after meeting the "B" qualifying standard in the long jump. She competed on 7 August in Group A, and finished joint 11th out of 16 athletes with Philippines' Marestella Torres, both of whom posting a jump of 6.22 metres. She ranked ahead of Ukraine's Marharyta Tverdohlib (6.19 metres) in a group led by Great Britain's Shara Proctor (6.83 metres). Sesay finished 23rd out of 32 athletes overall, (Note: Four athletes were not classified.) and was 0.18 metres behind a qualification spot, therefore not advancing to the final.

Key

- Note – Ranks given for track events are within the athlete's heat only
- Q = Qualified for the next round
- q = Qualified for the next round as a fastest loser or, in field events, by position without achieving the qualifying target
- NR = National record
- N/A = Round not applicable for the event
- Bye = Athlete not required to compete in round

Men

Athlete	Event	Heat		Semifinal		Final	
Athlete	Event	Result	Rank	Result	Rank	Result	Rank
Ibrahim Turay	200 m	21.90	8	Did not advance			

Women

Athlete	Event	Qualification		Final	
Athlete	Event	Distance	Position	Distance	Position
Ola Sesay	Long jump	6.22	23	Did not advance	
