= Sierra Leone at the 2016 Summer Paralympics =

- IPC code: SLE
- NPC: Association of Sports for the Disabled

in Rio de Janeiro
- Competitors: 1 in 1 sports
- Flag bearer: George Wyndham
- Medals: Gold 0 Silver 0 Bronze 0 Total 0

Summer Paralympics appearances (overview)
- 1996; 2000–2008; 2012; 2016; 2020; 2024

Sierra Leone sent a delegation to compete at the 2016 Summer Paralympics in Rio de Janeiro, Brazil, from 7 to 18 September 2016. This was the nation's third time competing at the Summer Paralympic Games after it made its debut twenty years prior at the 1996 Summer Paralympics. The delegation consisted of a single athlete, table tennis player George Wyndham, who lost both of his preliminary round matches to Zhang Yan of China and Thailand's Wanchai Chaiwut in the men's singles class 4 tournament and advanced no further in the competition.

== Background ==
Sierra Leone made its Paralympic debut at the 1996 Summer Paralympics in Atlanta, United States. The country did not participate in another Summer Paralympic Games until the 2012 London Paralympics. This made the Rio de Janeiro Summer Games Sierra Leone's third appearance at a Summer Paralympiad. The 2016 Summer Paralympics were held from 7–18 September 2016 with a total of 4,328 athletes representing 159 National Paralympic Committees (NPCs) taking part. Sierra Leone sent one athlete to Rio de Janeiro: table tennis player George Wyndham. He received financial assistance from the United Nations Development Programme. Wyndham was accompanied by executive secretary of the Association of Sports for the Disabled (the Sierra Leonean NPC) Alexander Thullah, director of sports Ibrahim Bangura, deputy minister of sports Ishmael Al Sankoh Conteh and coaches Emmanuel Lebbie and Alhassan Kamara. He was chosen as the flag bearer during the parade of nations for the opening ceremony.

== Disability classifications ==
Every participant at the Paralympics has their disability grouped into one of five disability categories; amputation, the condition may be congenital or sustained through injury or illness; cerebral palsy; wheelchair athletes, there is often overlap between this and other categories; visual impairment, including blindness; Les autres, any physical disability that does not fall strictly under one of the other categories, for example dwarfism or multiple sclerosis. Each Paralympic sport then has its own classifications, dependent upon the specific physical demands of competition. Events are given a code, made of numbers and letters, describing the type of event and classification of the athletes competing. Some sports, such as athletics, divide athletes by both the category and severity of their disabilities, other sports, for example swimming, group competitors from different categories together, the only separation being based on the severity of the disability.

== Table tennis ==
Paralympic debutant George Wyndman contracted polio at the age of five and he has used a wheelchair since. He began athletics at the age of eleven before switching to table tennis after a coach convinced him to take up the sport. Wyndham was 26 years old at the time of the Rio Summer Paralympics and was living in an office at the Siaka Stevens Stadium. He qualified for the men's singles class 4 tournament after receiving a wildcard from the Tripartite Commission. Before the Games, Wyndham said he wanted to become a catalyst of change for disability sports in Sierra Leone, "My dream is to see a delegation of 30 or 40 athletes going to a Games from Sierra Leone. I want more facilities and more equipment to incorporate other people with impairments in Sierra Leone." His first match was against Zhang Yan of China in the group round on 8 September. Wyndham lost the eighteen-minute match three sets to one with scores of 11–2, 11–6, 9–11 and 11–5. He lost his second match to Thailand's Wanchai Chaiwut three sets to zero (11–2, 11–9, 11–9) the following day and therefore that was the end of his competition because he was third and last in Group F and only the top two in each group could advance to the round of 16.

=== Men ===
Athlete	Event	Group Matches			Round of 16	Quarterfinals	Semifinals	Final / BM	
Athlete	Event	Opposition Result	Opposition Result	Rank	Opposition Result	Opposition Result	Opposition Result	Opposition Result	Rank
George Wyndham	Singles class 4	Zhang (CHN); L 1–3	Chaiwut (THA); L 0–3	3	did not advance				

== See also ==
- Sierra Leone at the 2016 Summer Olympics
