= Sunisa =

Sunisa is a given name. Notable people with the name include:

- Sunisa Lee (born 2003), American gymnast
- Sunisa Kawrungruang (born 1972), Thai sprinter
- Sunisa Srangthaisong (born 1988), Thai footballer
