= Kamanor =

Kamanor is a surname. Notable people with the surname include:

- Mohamed Kamanor (born 1992), Sierra Leonean footballer
- Sia Kamanor (born 1977), Sierra Leonean sprinter
