= Sierra Leone at the 1996 Summer Paralympics =

- IPC code: SLE
- NPC: Association of Sports for the Disabled

in Atlanta
- Competitors: 1 in 1 sport
- Medals: Gold 0 Silver 0 Bronze 0 Total 0

Summer Paralympics appearances (overview)
- 1996; 2000–2008; 2012; 2016; 2020; 2024

Sierra Leone competed at the 1996 Summer Paralympics in Atlanta, Georgia, United States. The delegation consisted of a single competitor, Kelley Marah in track and field athletics. Marah was registered in four events, but ended up competing in only one, the javelin throw. He did not win a medal.

== Athletics ==
Athlete	Event	Result	Rank
Kelley Marah	Men's javelin throw F34/37	31.40	6

== See also ==
- Sierra Leone at the 1996 Summer Olympics
