= Sierra Leone at the 2012 Summer Paralympics =

- IPC code: SLE
- NPC: Association of Sports for the Disabled

in London
- Competitors: 1 in 1 sport
- Medals: Gold 0 Silver 0 Bronze 0 Total 0

Summer Paralympics appearances (overview)
- 1996; 2000–2008; 2012; 2016; 2020; 2024

Sierra Leone competed at the 2012 Summer Paralympics in London, United Kingdom from August 29 to September 9, 2012.

== Athletics ==
Men's track

Athlete	Event	Heat		Final	
Athlete	Event	Result	Rank	Result	Rank
Mohamed Kamara	100m T46	11.97	7	Did not advance	
Mohamed Kamara	200m T46	24.46	8	Did not advance	

== See also ==
- Sierra Leone at the Paralympics
- Sierra Leone at the 2012 Summer Olympics
