= Sierra Leone at the Paralympics =

- IPC code: SLE
- NPC: Association of Sports for the Disabled
- Medals: Gold 0 Silver 0 Bronze 0 Total 0

Summer appearances
- 1996; 2000–2008; 2012; 2016; 2020; 2024

Sierra Leone made its first Paralympic Games appearance at the 1996 Summer Paralympics in Atlanta, where it entered just one competitor in athletics. Kelley Marah, who was registered in four events but participated only in the javelin, did not win a medal.

== Full results for Sierra Leone at the Paralympics ==
Name	Games	Sport	Event	Score	Rank
Kelley Marah	1996 Atlanta	Athletics	Men's 200m T37	DNS	-
Kelley Marah	1996 Atlanta	Athletics	Men's discus F34/37	DNS	-
Kelley Marah	1996 Atlanta	Athletics	Men's javelin throw F34/37	31.40	6
Kelley Marah	1996 Atlanta	Athletics	Men's shot put F34/37	DNS	-
Mohamed Kamara	2012 London	Athletics	Men's 100m T46	11.97	7th in heat 2; Did not advance
Mohamed Kamara	2012 London	Athletics	Men's 200m T46	24.46	8th in heat 3; Did not advance
George Wyndham	2016 Rio	Table tennis	Men's singles class 4	0–2	3rd in Group F; Did not advance
Sorie Kargbo	2020 Tokyo	Athletics	Men's long jump T47	5.78 m	12th
Juan Faith Jackson	2020 Tokyo	Athletics	Women's javelin F46	24.16 m	10th
George Wyndham	2024 Paris	Athletics	Men's javelin F57	15.07 m	11th

== See also ==
- Sierra Leone at the Olympics
