= Sierra Leone at the Olympics =

- IOC code: SLE
- NOC: National Olympic Committee of Sierra Leone
- Website: www.nocsl.org
- Medals: Gold 0 Silver 0 Bronze 0 Total 0

Summer appearances
- 1968; 1972–1976; 1980; 1984; 1988; 1992; 1996; 2000; 2004; 2008; 2012; 2016; 2020; 2024; 2028

Sierra Leone has sent athletes to every Summer Olympic Games since 1968 with the exception of 1972 and 1976, but the nation has yet to win an Olympic medal. No athletes from Sierra Leone have competed in any Winter Olympic Games. Its highest placement so far is 5th, by heptathlete Eunice Barber at the women's event at the 1996 Summer Olympics, and a quarterfinal finish by boxer Israel Cole at the men's light middleweight event at the 1984 Summer Olympics.

== Medal tables ==
=== Medals by Games ===
Games	Athletes	Gold	Silver	Bronze	Total	Rank
1968 Mexico City	3	0	0	0	0	–
1972 Munich	did not participate					
1976 Montreal	did not participate					
1980 Moscow	14	0	0	0	0	–
1984 Los Angeles	7	0	0	0	0	–
1988 Seoul	12	0	0	0	0	–
1992 Barcelona	11	0	0	0	0	–
1996 Atlanta	14	0	0	0	0	–
2000 Sydney	3	0	0	0	0	–
2004 Athens	2	0	0	0	0	–
2008 Beijing	3	0	0	0	0	–
2012 London	2	0	0	0	0	–
2016 Rio de Janeiro	4	0	0	0	0	–
2020 Tokyo	4	0	0	0	0	–
2024 Paris	4	0	0	0	0	–
2028 Los Angeles	future event					
2032 Brisbane	future event					
Total		0	0	0	0	–

== See also ==
- List of flag bearers for Sierra Leone at the Olympics
- Sierra Leone at the Paralympics
