= Sierra Leone at the 2000 Summer Olympics =

- IOC code: SLE
- NOC: National Olympic Committee of Sierra Leone
- Website: www.nocsl.org

in Sydney
- Competitors: 3
- Flag bearer: Ekundayo Williams
- Medals: Gold 0 Silver 0 Bronze 0 Total 0

Summer Olympics appearances (overview)
- 1968; 1972–1976; 1980; 1984; 1988; 1992; 1996; 2000; 2004; 2008; 2012; 2016; 2020; 2024

Sierra Leone sent a delegation to compete at the 2000 Summer Olympics in Sydney, Australia from 15 September to 1 October 2000. This was the African nation's sixth time appearing at a Summer Olympic Games. The delegation consisted of three competitors, two track and field athletes; Alpha B. Kamara and Ekundayo Williams; and weightlifter Joseph Bellon. Neither of the track athletes advanced beyond the first round of their events, while Bellon finished 16th in the men's under 77 kg event.

== Background ==
The National Olympic Committee of Sierra Leone was recognised by the International Olympic Committee on 1 January 1964. The nation made its Olympic debut four years later in the 1968 Summer Olympics, but did not make their second appearance until the 1980 Moscow Olympics. They have sent athletes to every Summer Olympic Games since Moscow, making these Sydney Games their seventh appearance. Sierra Leone has yet to appear at the Winter Olympic Games. The 2000 Summer Olympics were held from 15 September to 1 October 2000; a total of 10,651 athletes represented 199 National Olympic Committees. Their delegation to Sydney consisted of three competitors, two track and field athletes; Alpha B. Kamara and Ekundayo Williams; and weightlifter Joseph Bellon. Williams was chosen as the flag-bearer for the opening ceremony.

== Competitors ==
The following is the list of number of competitors in the Games.

Sport	Men	Women	Total
Athletics	1	1	2
Weightlifting	1	0	1
Total	2	1	3

== Athletics ==
Alpha B. Kamara was 21 years old at the time of the Sydney Olympics, and was making his only Olympic appearance. On 22 September he participated in the first round heats of the men's 100 metres, and was drawn into heat ten. He finished his heat in a time of 10.74 seconds, eighth out of nine competitors in that heat, and was therefore eliminated. The gold medal was eventually won in 9.87 seconds by Maurice Greene of the United States; the silver was won by Ato Boldon of Trinidad and Tobago, and the bronze was earned by Obadele Thompson of Barbados.

Ekundayo Williams was 22 years old at the time of these Games, and was likewise making her only appearance in Olympic competition. On 23 September, she participated in the first round of the women's 100 metres, and was assigned to heat six. She finished the race in a time of 12.19 seconds, contemporaneously sixth out of nine in her heat, and was not allowed to progress to the next round. In the event overall, the gold medal is vacant due to original gold medallist Marion Jones of the United States admitting to steroid use and forfeiting her medals and results from the Sydney Games. Officially, the medals in the event are held by Ekaterini Thanou of Greece and Tayna Lawrence (the original bronze medallist) of Jamaica sharing silver, and Merlene Ottey, also of Jamaica, the original fourth-place finisher, being awarded a bronze. Gold was left vacant because Thanou, the original silver medalist, had her own issue with missing a drug test at the 2004 Summer Olympics. After Jones' disqualification, Williams is now considered to have came fifth in her heat, as the original winner of that race was Jones.

Athletes	Events	Heat Round 1		Heat Round 2		Semifinal		Final	
Athletes	Events	Time	Rank	Time	Rank	Time	Rank	Time	Rank
Alpha B. Kamara	Men's 100 metres	10.74	8	did not advance					
Ekundayo Williams	Women's 100 metres	12.19	5	did not advance					

== Weightlifting ==
Joseph Bellon was 24 years old at the time of the Sydney Olympics, and was making his only appearance in the Olympics. On 22 September, he competed in the men's under 77 kg bodyweight category. Each athlete received three attempts in the snatch, and those that recorded a mark in the snatch received three attempts at the clean and jerk. Final placement was determined by the sum of an athlete's best mark in both disciplines, and ties were broken by whichever of the athletes had weighed in with a lower bodyweight. In the snatch, Bellon lifted 90 kg, 92.5 kg, and 95 kg in his three attempts, making his total for the snatch 95 kg. In the clean and jerk, he lifted 95 kg, 100 kg, and 105 kg, making his mark for the clean and jerk portion of the competition 105 kg. His total mark for the event was therefore 200 kg, the least weight lifted of any of the 16 competitors who set a mark for both disciplines. Both Zhan Xugang of China and Viktor Mitrou of Greece lifted a total of 367.5 kg, but Zhan, as the lighter athlete, won the gold medal, and Mitrou received the silver. Bronze was earned by Arsen Melikyan of Armenia.

Athlete	Event	Snatch			Clean & Jerk			Total	Rank
Athlete	Event	1	2	3	1	2	3	Total	Rank
Joseph Bellon	Men's – 77 kg	90.0	92.5	95.0	95.0	100.0	105.0	200.0	16
