= Sierra Leone at the 2020 Summer Paralympics =

- IPC code: SLE
- NPC: Association of Sports for the Disabled

in Tokyo
- Competitors: 2 in 1 sports
- Flag bearers: Sorie Kargbo and Juan Faith Jackson
- Medals: Gold 0 Silver 0 Bronze 0 Total 0

Summer Paralympics appearances (overview)
- 1996; 2000–2008; 2012; 2016; 2020; 2024

Sierra Leone sent a delegation to compete at the 2020 Summer Paralympics in Tokyo, Japan, from 24 August to 5 September 2021. This was the nation's fourth time competing at the Summer Paralympic Games after it made its debut twenty years prior at the 1996 Summer Paralympics. The delegation consisted of 2 Athletes from one sport.

== Background ==
Sierra Leone made its Paralympic debut at the 1996 Summer Paralympics in Atlanta, United States. The country did not participate in another Summer Paralympic Games until the 2012 London Paralympics. This made the 2020 Summer Paralympics Sierra Leone's fourth appearance at a Summer Paralympiad.

== Disability classifications ==
Every participant at the Paralympics has their disability grouped into one of five disability categories; amputation, the condition may be congenital or sustained through injury or illness; cerebral palsy; wheelchair athletes, there is often overlap between this and other categories; visual impairment, including blindness; Les autres, any physical disability that does not fall strictly under one of the other categories, for example dwarfism or multiple sclerosis. Each Paralympic sport then has its own classifications, dependent upon the specific physical demands of competition. Events are given a code, made of numbers and letters, describing the type of event and classification of the athletes competing. Some sports, such as athletics, divide athletes by both the category and severity of their disabilities, other sports, for example swimming, group competitors from different categories together, the only separation being based on the severity of the disability.

== Athletics ==
Sierra Leone send 2 athletes for long jump and the javelin, both athletes finished 12th and 10th respectively.

Field

Men

Athlete	Event	Final	
Result	Rank	Result	Rank
Sorie Kargbo	Men Long Jump T47	5.78	12

Female

Athlete	Event	Final	
Result	Rank	Result	Rank
Juan Faith Jackson	Women's Javelin F46	24.16	10

== See also ==
- Sierra Leone at the Paralympics
