= Lantoniaina Ramalalanirina =

Malagasy sprinter

Personal information
- Nationality: Malagasy
- Born: 12 April 1977 (age 49) Madagascar
- Height: 150 cm (4 ft 11 in)
- Weight: 48 kg (106 lb)

Sport
- Country: Madagascar
- Sport: Sprinting

Achievements and titles
- Personal best: 11.63
Medal record
Women's athletics
Representing Madagascar
African Championships
Silver medal – second place	1993 Durban	4×100 m

Lantoniaina Ramalalanirina is a Malagasy Olympic sprinter. She represented her country in the Women's 4 × 100 metres relay at the 1996 Summer Olympics. Her team did not finish their first qualifying race. Her sister is the fellow Olympian sprinter Nicole Ramalalanirina. She was also a silver medalist at the All-African Games.
