= Sierra Leone at the 2016 Summer Olympics =

- IOC code: SLE
- NOC: National Olympic Committee of Sierra Leone
- Website: www.nocsl.org

in Rio de Janeiro
- Competitors: 4 in 2 sports
- Flag bearer: Bunturabie Jalloh
- Medals: Gold 0 Silver 0 Bronze 0 Total 0

Summer Olympics appearances (overview)
- 1968; 1972–1976; 1980; 1984; 1988; 1992; 1996; 2000; 2004; 2008; 2012; 2016; 2020; 2024; 2028

Sierra Leone competed at the 2016 Summer Olympics in Rio de Janeiro, Brazil, from 5 to 21 August 2016. This was the nation's eleventh appearance at the Summer Olympics since its debut in 1968, except for two occasions. Sierra Leone failed to register any athletes at the 1972 Summer Olympics in Munich, and also joined the rest of the African nations to boycott the 1976 Summer Olympics in Montreal.

Four athletes, two per gender, were selected to the Sierra Leone team for the Games, competing only in both athletics and swimming (the country's Olympic debut in Rio de Janeiro). 18-year-old freestyle swimmer Bunturabie Jalloh became the second female athlete to carry the Sierra Leonean flag in the opening ceremony at successive Games, after long jumper Ola Sesay performed the duty in London four years earlier. Sierra Leone, however, has yet to win its first ever Olympic medal.

== Athletics ==
Sierre Leone has received universality slots from IAAF to send two athletes (one male and one female) to the Olympics.

Key

- Note–Ranks given for track events are within the athlete's heat only
- Q = Qualified for the next round
- q = Qualified for the next round as a fastest loser or, in field events, by position without achieving the qualifying target
- NR = National record
- N/A = Round not applicable for the event
- Bye = Athlete not required to compete in round

Track & road events

Athlete	Event	Heat		Quarterfinal		Semifinal		Final	
Athlete	Event	Result	Rank	Result	Rank	Result	Rank	Result	Rank
Ishmail Kamara	Men's 100 m	10.95	4	did not advance					
Hafsatu Kamara	Women's 100 m	12.24	1 Q	12.22	8	did not advance			

== Swimming ==
Sierra Leone has received a Universality invitation from FINA to send two swimmers (one male and one female) to the Olympics, signifying the nation's Olympic return to the sport for the first time since 1996.

Athlete	Event	Heat		Semifinal		Final	
Athlete	Event	Time	Rank	Time	Rank	Time	Rank
Osman Kamara	Men's 50 m freestyle	26.90	73	did not advance			
Bunturabie Jalloh	Women's 50 m freestyle	39.93	88	did not advance			
