= Solomon Bockarie =

Dutch sprinter

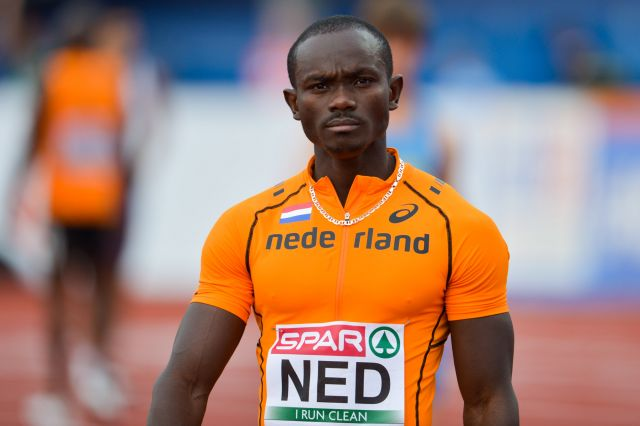

Personal information
- Born: 18 May 1987 (age 39) Makeni, Sierra Leone
- Height: 1.71 m (5 ft 7 1/2 in)
- Weight: 72 kg (159 lb)

Sport
- Country: Netherlands
- Sport: Track and field
- Event: sprinter

Solomon Bockarie (born 18 May 1987), sometimes Solomon Bayoh (born 18 May 1990), is a male Dutch sprinter. He competed in the 4 × 100 metres relay at the 2015 World Championships in Athletics in Beijing, China. He competed in the 2016 Summer Olympics.

He was born in Makeni, Sierra Leone and is a naturalised Dutch citizen.

Bayoh represented Sierra Leone at the 2008 Summer Olympics in Beijing. He competed at the 200 metres and placed eighth in his first round heat in a time of 22.16 seconds, which was not enough to advance to the second round. He was one of three competitors at the Olympics competing for Sierra Leone. Michaela Kargbo and Saidu Kargbo were the others. He again represented his birth nation at the 2014 Commonwealth Games.

In 2015, Bockarie transferred his country of allegiance from to the Netherlands.

In July 2022, Bockarie tested positive for the growth hormone GHRP-2 and was subsequently issued for a four-year ban set to expire in August 2026.

== See also ==
- Netherlands at the 2015 World Championships in Athletics

Olympic Games
Preceded by Hawanatu Bangura	Flag bearer for Sierra Leone; 2008 Beijing	Succeeded by Ola Sesay
