= Sierra Leone at the 1983 World Championships in Athletics =

- Flag of Sierra Leone
- WA code: SLE

in Helsinki, Finland August 7–14, 1983
- Competitors: 2 (2 men) in 2 events
- Medals: Gold 0 Silver 0 Bronze 0 Total 0

World Championships in Athletics appearances
- 1983; 1987; 1991; 1993; 1995; 1997; 1999; 2001; 2003–2005; 2007; 2009; 2011; 2013; 2015; 2017; 2019; 2022; 2023

Sierra Leone competed at the 1983 World Championships in Athletics in Helsinki, Finland, from August 7 to 14, 1983.

== Men ==
Track and road events

| Athlete | Event | Heat | | Quarterfinal | | Semifinal | | Final | |
| Athlete | Event | Result | Rank | Result | Rank | Result | Rank | Result | Rank |
|---|---|---|---|---|---|---|---|---|---|
| David Sawyerr | 200 metres | 22.23 | 37 | Did not advance | | | | | |
| David Sawyerr | 400 metres | 49.29 | 42 | Did not advance | | | | | |
