= Abdul Mansaray =

Sierra Leonean sprinter

Personal information
- Nationality: Sierra Leonean
- Born: 26 November 1961 (age 64)

Sport
- Sport: Sprinting
- Event: 4 × 100 metres relay

Abdul Mansaray (born 26 November 1961) is a Sierra Leonean sprinter. He competed in the men's 4 × 100 metres relay at the 1984 Summer Olympics.

== Career ==
Born in Freetown, Mansaray was a top sprinter in high school and then at national competitions. He was part of a relay team that set a long-standing national record and competed at multiple international events. In addition to his sprinting career, he also mentored several other top Sierra Leone athletes including Felix Sandy.

Mansaray ran his 100 metres personal best of 10.7 seconds in 1983. He was seeded in the 6th 4 × 100 m heat at the 1984 Olympics. He led off the Sierra Leonean team to place 6th in 40.77 seconds and did not advance. He was also entered in the 4 × 400 metres relay but did not start.

Mansaray also attended the 1988 Summer Olympics. Following the failed drugs test of Canadian sprinter Ben Johnson there, he said he was "surprised but not shocked" because he saw Johnson have red eyes during the 1987 World Championships in Athletics. He also thought that Johnson's 9.7 time for 100 metres was unrealistic. He also noted Johnson wasn't smiling and wouldn't look at other people.
