= Athletics at the 2012 Summer Olympics – Men's 200 metres =

Men's 200 metres at the Games of the XXX Olympiad
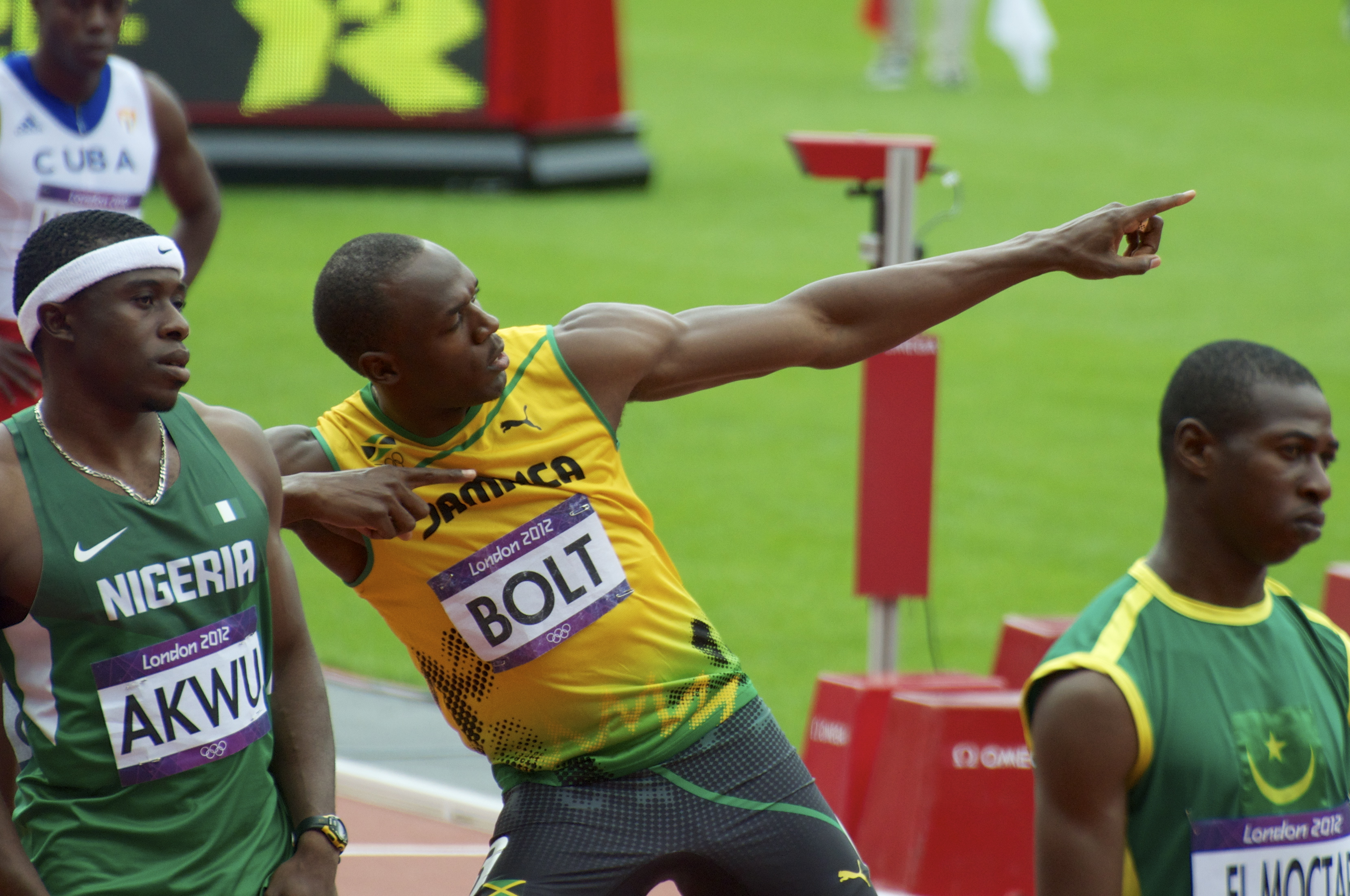
- Usain Bolt
- Venue: Olympic Stadium
- Dates: 7–9 August
- Competitors: 54 from 40 nations
- Winning time: 19.32

Medalists
1st place, gold medalist(s)		Usain Bolt; Jamaica
2nd place, silver medalist(s)		Yohan Blake; Jamaica
3rd place, bronze medalist(s)		Warren Weir; Jamaica

Official video

The men's 200 metres competition at the 2012 Summer Olympics in London, United Kingdom was held at the Olympic Stadium on 7–9 August. There were 54 competitors from 40 nations. The event was won by Usain Bolt of Jamaica, the first man to repeat as champion in the 200 metres. His teammates Yohan Blake (silver) and Warren Weir (bronze) completed the medal sweep; it was the seventh sweep in the men's 200 metres and the first by a nation other than the United States. Bolt's gold medal was Jamaica's third in the event, moving out of a tie with Canada and Italy for second-most overall (behind the United States' 17 wins).

This was only the fourth time that the United States failed to win a medal in the men's 200 metres, Wallace Spearmon finishing fourth with a time of 19.90, 0.06 seconds outside of a medal placing (the others being the 1928 Olympics, the 1980 Olympics in Moscow which the country boycotted, and the 2000 Olympics).

== Background ==
This was the 26th appearance of the event, which was not held at the first Olympics in 1896 but has been on the program ever since. Two of the eight finalists from the 2008 Games returned: gold medalist Usain Bolt of Jamaica, fifth-place finisher Christian Malcolm of Great Britain, and the two men who had finished second and third but been disqualified for stepping out of their lanes: Churandy Martina of the Netherlands Antilles and Wallace Spearmon of the United States. Bolt, in addition to being reigning Olympic champion, had won the 2009 and 2011 World Championships.

Bolt was looking to do something no man had done before: repeat as 200 metres Olympic champion. Jesse Owens ran afoul of harsh amateurism rules after his 1936 win (and would have lost any opportunity to repeat with the outbreak of World War II in any case); Andy Stanfield lost by 0.22 seconds in 1956 after winning in 1952; Pietro Mennea made the final four times and came away with a gold and a bronze; Carl Lewis lost by 0.04 seconds in 1988 after winning in 1984; food poisoning robbed Michael Johnson of his first opportunity in 1992 before he won in 1996; Bolt himself had made Shawn Crawford the third gold-silver winner by beating him in 2008. He was a heavy favorite in the event; countryman Yohan Blake was his biggest challenger, but Bolt had beaten Blake to repeat as 100 metres champion earlier in London and was considered stronger in the 200 metres. The United States, which had the winner in 5 of the last 7 appearances of the event, had no strong runner to challenge Bolt.

For the first time, no nations made their debut in the event. The United States made its 25th appearance, most of any nation, having missed only the boycotted 1980 Games.

== Summary ==
The semifinal round showed all three Jamaican athletes were the class of the field. In heat one, Yohan Blake had a huge lead and relaxed down the straightaway, almost too much as Wallace Spearmon and Christophe Lemaitre raced to the line behind him in the fastest heat of the day. Usain Bolt dominated the second heat, jogging and looking around for non-existent challengers down the straight. And in heat three, Warren Weir was running easily, easing up at the finish to let Churandy Martina take the first spot, knowing he had qualified in the second position. Slowest qualifier Álex Quiñónez, racing hard for his 20.37, was on the opposite side of a clear dividing line in the field.

In the final, Bolt, who was in lane 7, moved past his Jamaican teammate Weir after only 50 metres; coming off the bend and onto the final 100-metre straight, Bolt's lead over the rest of the field had grown to several metres, however Blake began to pull him back. Due to the lead he had built in the first 120 meters, it was Bolt who crossed the line first in a time of 19.32, already easing off before the line. In doing so, he became the first man in history to do the "double double" – winning both the 100 and 200 metres twice, back to back (he would later break this record by winning the 4 × 100 m relay and completing the Double Triple, at the same Olympics). Blake took the silver medal, as he had done in the 100 metres final, again behind Bolt. His time was the fastest ever time to not win a gold medal. Weir completed the 1–2–3 sweep for the Jamaicans by winning the bronze medal, the second time in any international competition that Jamaica has achieved this (after the women did it in the 2008 100 metres).

Bolt's time of 19.32 was coincidentally the time he had beaten when he first broke the 200 metres world record at the 2008 Beijing Olympics, set by Michael Johnson at the 1996 Atlanta Olympics 200 metres.

As of December 2023, Blake's time of 19.44 seconds remains the fastest non-winning time in history.

== Qualification ==
A National Olympic Committee (NOC) could enter up to 3 qualified athletes in the men's 200 metres event if all athletes met the A standard, or 1 athlete if they met the B standard. The qualifying time standards could be obtained in various meets during the qualifying period that had the approval of the IAAF. For the sprints and short hurdles, including the 200 metres, only outdoor meets were eligible. The A standard for the 2012 men's 200 metres was 20.55 seconds; the B standard was 20.65 seconds. The qualifying period for was from 1 May 2011 to 8 July 2012. NOCs could also have an athlete enter the 200 metres through a universality place. NOCs could enter one male athlete in an athletics event, regardless of time, if they had no male athletes meeting the qualifying A or B standards in any men's athletic event.

== Competition format ==
For the first time since 1920 established a four-round competition, the number of rounds was changed. The 2012 competition had only three rounds: quarterfinals, semifinals and a final. The "fastest loser" system introduced in 1960 was used in the semifinals for the first time, as the number of semifinals increased from 2 to 3.

There were 7 quarterfinals of 7 or 8 runners each, with the top 3 men in each as well as the next 3 fastest overall advancing to the semifinals. There were 3 semifinals, each with 8 runners. The top 2 athletes in each semifinal and the next 2 overall advanced. The final had 8 runners. The races were run on a 400 metre track.

== Records ==
Prior to this competition, the existing global records were as follows:

Global records before the 2012 Summer Olympics
Record	Athlete (Nation)	Time (s)	Location	Date
World record	Usain Bolt (JAM)	19.19	Berlin, Germany	20 August 2009
Olympic record	Usain Bolt (JAM)	19.30	Beijing, China	20 August 2008
World leading	Yohan Blake (JAM)	19.80	Kingston, Jamaica	1 July 2012

No new world or Olympic records were set during the competition. The following new national records were set during the competition.

Nation	Athlete	Time
Swaziland national record	Sibusiso Matsenjwa	20.93
Ecuador national record	Álex Quiñónez	20.28

== Schedule ==
All times are British Summer Time (UTC+1)

Date	Time	Round
Tuesday, 7 August 2012	11:50	Quarterfinals
Wednesday, 8 August 2012	20:10	Semifinals
Thursday, 9 August 2012	20:55	Final

== Results ==
Official Video of the First Round

=== Quarterfinals ===
Qual. rule: first 3 of each heat (Q) plus the 3 fastest times (q) qualified.

==== Quarterfinal 1 ====
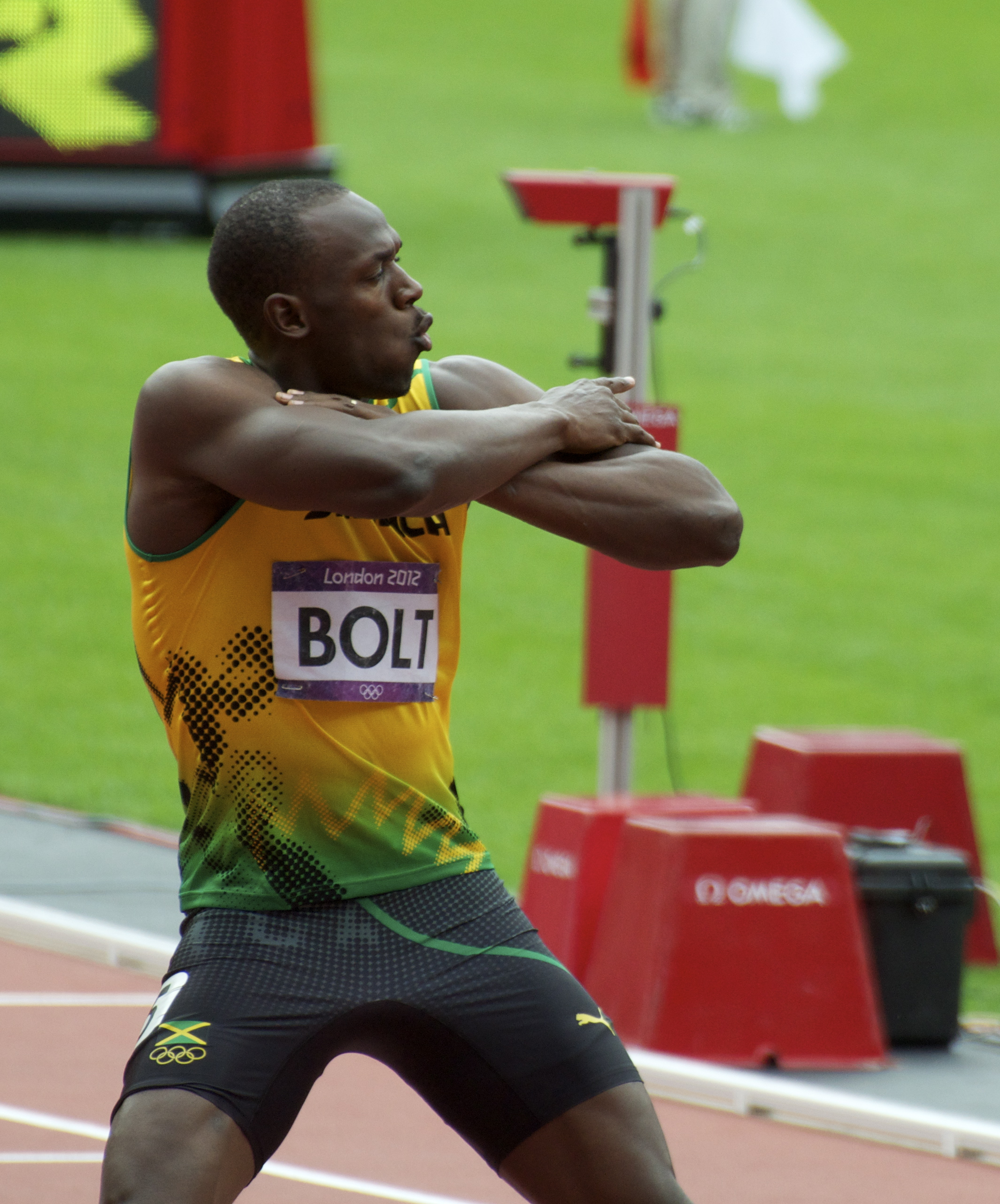
Usain Bolt after his heat

Rank	Athlete	Nation	Time	Notes
1	Usain Bolt	Jamaica	20.39	Q
2	Aldemir da Silva Junior	Brazil	20.53	Q
3	Isiah Young	United States	20.55	Q
4	Alex Wilson	Switzerland	20.57	q
5	Noah Akwu	Nigeria	20.67	
6	Michael Herrera	Cuba	21.05	
7	Vyacheslav Muravyev	Kazakhstan	21.75	
8	Jidou El Moctar	Mauritania	22.94	PB

==== Quarterfinal 2 ====
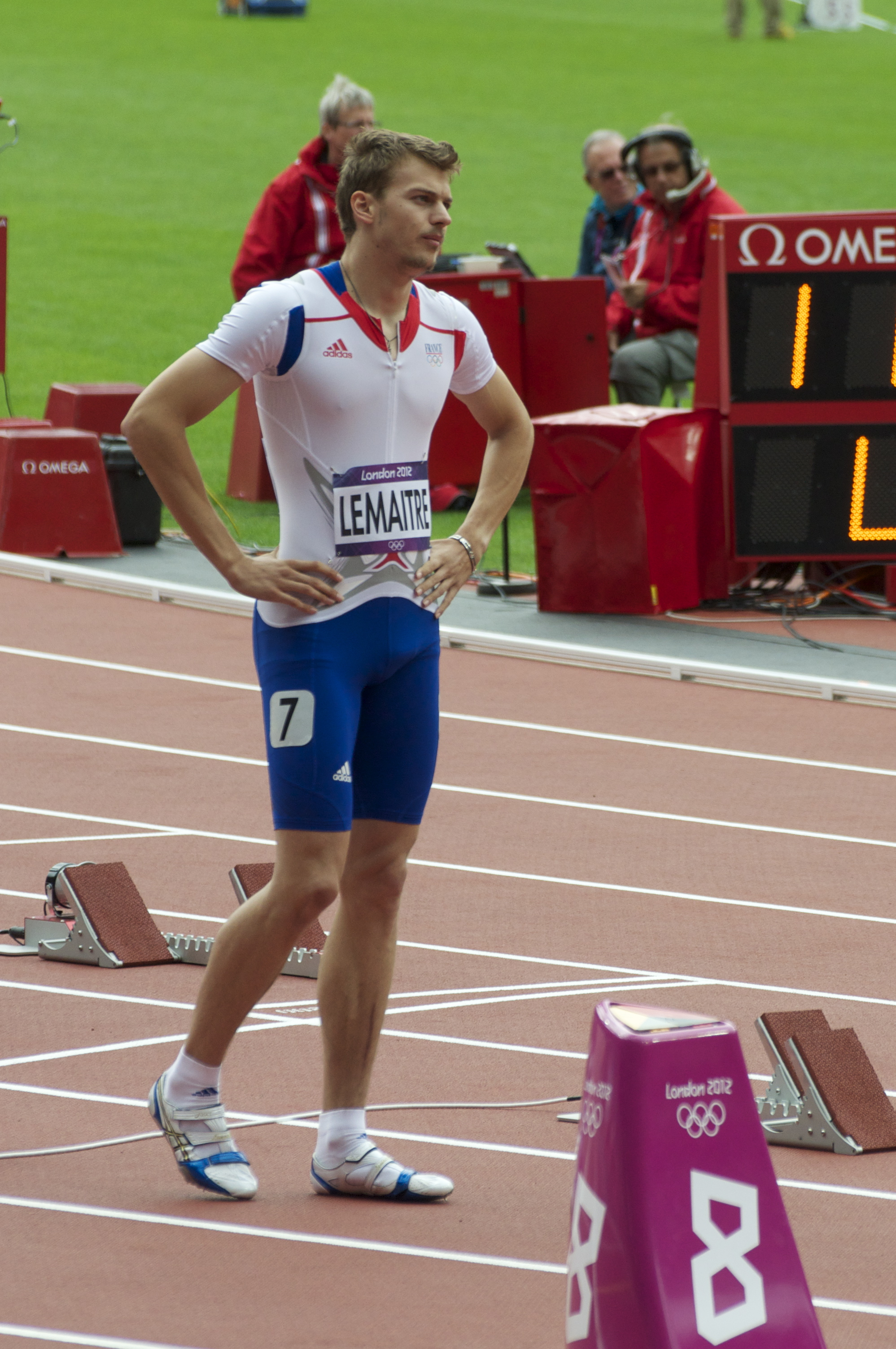
Christophe Lemaitre before his heat

Rank	Athlete	Nation	Time	Notes
1	Christophe Lemaitre	France	20.34	Q
2	Anaso Jobodwana	South Africa	20.46	Q
3	Aaron Brown	Canada	20.55	Q, PB
4	Likoúrgos-Stéfanos Tsákonas	Greece	20.56	q
5	Rondel Sorrillo	Trinidad and Tobago	20.76	
6	Carlos Jorge	Dominican Republic	21.02	
7	Cristián Reyes	Chile	21.29	
8	Ibrahim Turay	Sierra Leone	21.90	PB

==== Quarterfinal 3 ====
Rank	Athlete	Nation	Time	Notes
1	Maurice Mitchell	United States	20.54	Q
2	Christian Malcolm	Great Britain	20.59	Q
3	Michael Mathieu	Bahamas	20.62	Q
4	Roberto Skyers	Cuba	20.66	
5	Shota Iizuka	Japan	20.81	
6	Sibusiso Matsenjwa	Swaziland	20.93	NR
7	José Carlos Herrera	Mexico	21.17	
8	Joel Redhead	Grenada	21.22	

==== Quarterfinal 4 ====
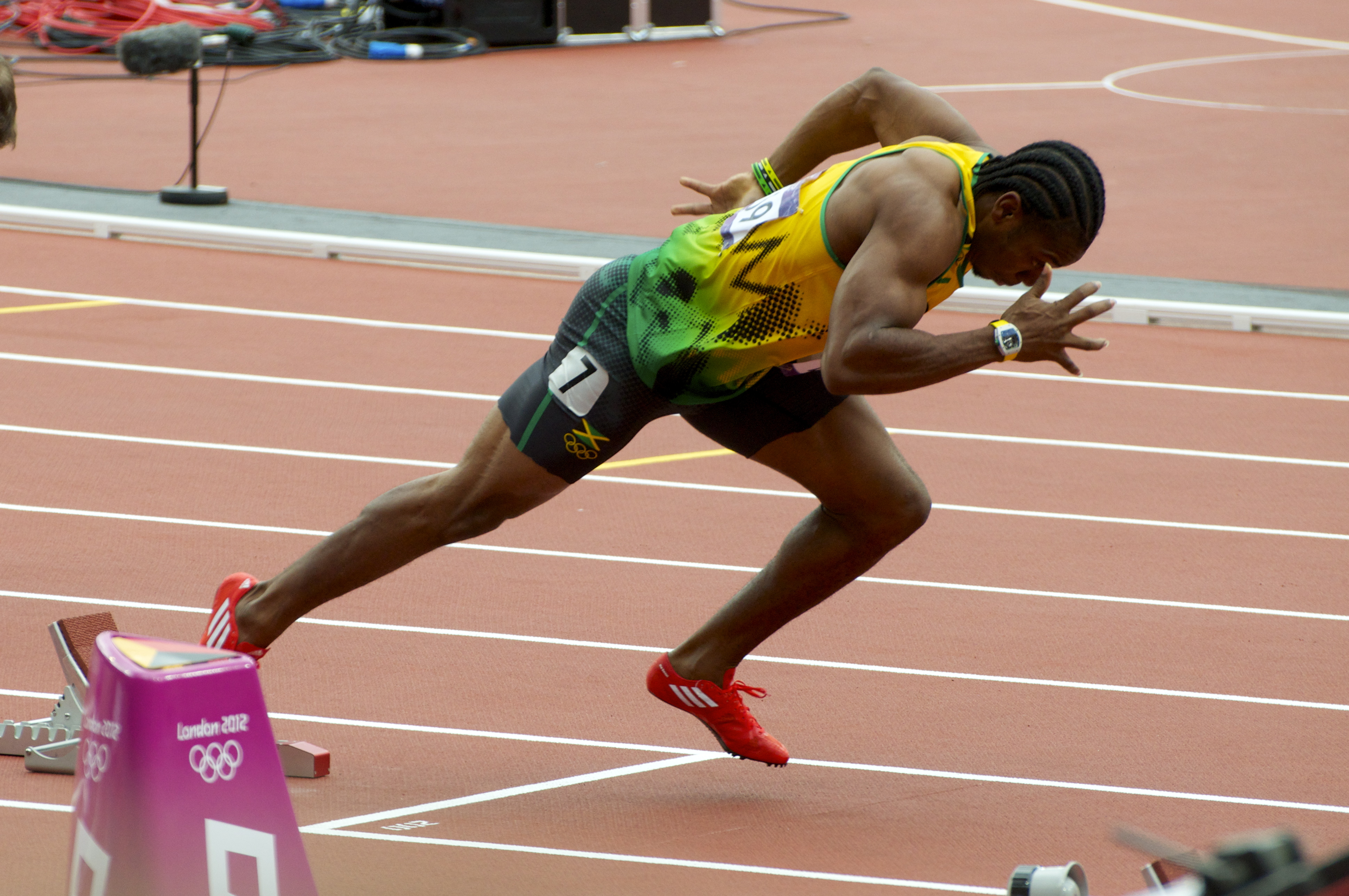
Yohan Blake starts his heat

Rank	Athlete	Nation	Time	Notes
1	Yohan Blake	Jamaica	20.38	Q
2	Bruno de Barros	Brazil	20.52	Q
3	Jaysuma Saidy Ndure	Norway	20.52	Q
4	Serhiy Smelyk	Ukraine	20.65	
5	Paul Hession	Ireland	20.69	
6	Xie Zhenye	China	20.69	
7	Mosito Lehata	Lesotho	20.74	

==== Quarterfinal 5 ====
Rank	Athlete	Nation	Time	Notes
1	Warren Weir	Jamaica	20.29	Q
2	Antoine Adams	Saint Kitts and Nevis	20.59	Q
3	Kamil Krynski	Poland	20.66	Q
4	Pavel Maslák	Czech Republic	20.67	
5	Tremaine Harris	Canada	20.70	
6	Marek Niit	Estonia	20.82	
7	Reto Schenkel	Switzerland	20.98	
—	Alonso Edward	Panama	DQ	R 162.7

==== Quarterfinal 6 ====
Rank	Athlete	Nation	Time	Notes
1	Álex Quiñónez	Ecuador	20.28	Q, NR
2	Wallace Spearmon	United States	20.47	Q
3	Shinji Takahira	Japan	20.57	Q
4	Brendan Christian	Antigua and Barbuda	20.63	q, SB
5	Jonathan Åstrand	Finland	20.73	SB
6	Aziz Ouhadi	Morocco	20.80	
7	Sandro Viana	Brazil	21.05	
—	Ben Youssef Meité	Ivory Coast	DNS	

==== Quarterfinal 7 ====
Rank	Athlete	Nation	Time	Notes
1	Churandy Martina	Netherlands	20.58	Q
2	Kei Takase	Japan	20.72	Q
3	Jared Connaughton	Canada	20.72	Q
4	Amr Ibrahim Mostafa Seoud	Egypt	20.81	
5	Arnaldo Abrantes	Portugal	20.88	
6	James Ellington	Great Britain	21.23	
7	Trevorvano Mackey	Bahamas	21.28	
8	Jean-Yves Esparon	Seychelles	21.99	

Official Video of the Semifinal Round

=== Semifinals ===
Qual. rule: first 2 of each heat (Q) plus the 2 fastest times (q) qualified.

==== Semifinal 1 ====
Rank	Athlete	Nation	Time	Notes
1	Yohan Blake	Jamaica	20.01	Q
2	Wallace Spearmon	United States	20.02	Q
3	Christophe Lemaitre	France	20.03	q
4	Jaysuma Saidy Ndure	Norway	20.42	
5	Likoúrgos-Stéfanos Tsákonas	Greece	20.52	PB
6	Bruno de Barros	Brazil	20.55	
7	Jared Connaughton	Canada	20.64	
8	Kei Takase	Japan	20.70	

==== Semifinal 2 ====
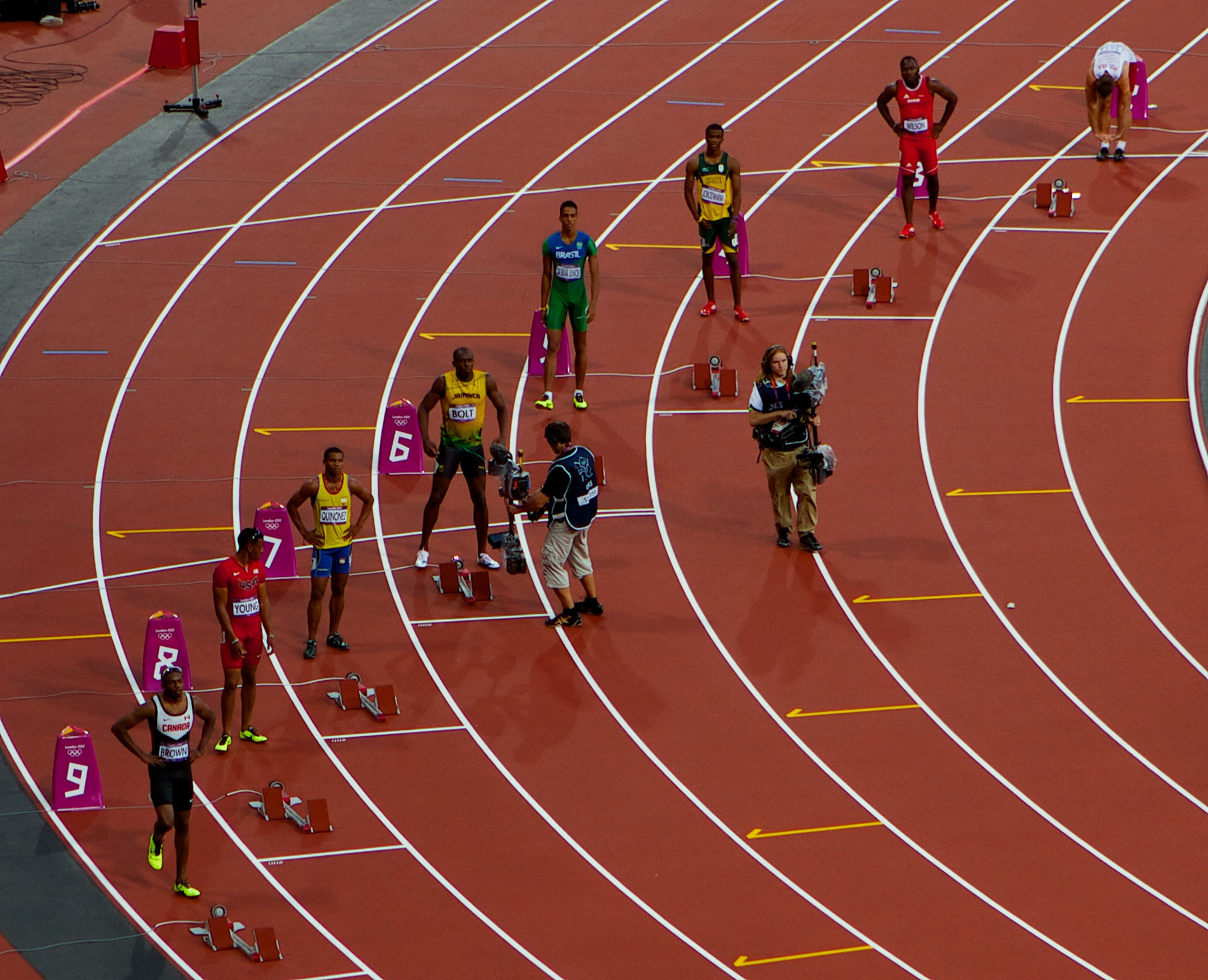
The start of the second semifinal

Rank	Athlete	Nation	Time	Notes
1	Usain Bolt	Jamaica	20.18	Q
2	Anaso Jobodwana	South Africa	20.27	Q, PB
3	Álex Quiñónez	Ecuador	20.37	q
4	Aaron Brown	Canada	20.42	PB
5	Aldemir da Silva Junior	Brazil	20.63	
6	Kamil Krynski	Poland	20.83	
7	Alex Wilson	Switzerland	20.85	
8	Isiah Young	United States	20.89	

==== Semifinal 3 ====
Rank	Athlete	Nation	Time	Notes
1	Churandy Martina	Netherlands	20.17	Q
2	Warren Weir	Jamaica	20.28	Q
3	Christian Malcolm	Great Britain	20.51	
4	Maurice Mitchell	United States	20.56	
5	Brendan Christian	Antigua and Barbuda	20.58	SB
6	Shinji Takahira	Japan	20.77	
—	Antoine Adams	Saint Kitts and Nevis	DQ	R 163.3a
—	Michael Mathieu	Bahamas	DQ	R 162.7

=== Final ===
Rank	Lane	Athlete	Nation	Time	Notes
1st place, gold medalist(s)	7	Usain Bolt	Jamaica	19.32	WL, SB
2nd place, silver medalist(s)	4	Yohan Blake	Jamaica	19.44	SB
3rd place, bronze medalist(s)	8	Warren Weir	Jamaica	19.84	PB
4	6	Wallace Spearmon	United States	19.90	SB
5	5	Churandy Martina	Netherlands	20.00	
6	2	Christophe Lemaitre	France	20.19	
7	3	Álex Quiñónez	Ecuador	20.57	
8	9	Anaso Jobodwana	South Africa	20.69	
				Wind: +0.4 m/s	
