= Sierra Leone at the 2020 Summer Olympics =

- IOC code: SLE
- NOC: National Olympic Committee of Sierra Leone
- Website: www.nocsl.org

in Tokyo July 23, 2021 – August 8, 2021
- Competitors: 4 in 3 sports
- Flag bearers (opening): Maggie Barrie; Frederick Harris
- Flag bearer (closing): N/A
- Medals: Gold 0 Silver 0 Bronze 0 Total 0

Summer Olympics appearances (overview)
- 1968; 1972–1976; 1980; 1984; 1988; 1992; 1996; 2000; 2004; 2008; 2012; 2016; 2020; 2024

Sierra Leone competed at the 2020 Summer Olympics in Tokyo. Originally scheduled to for 24 July to 9 August 2020, the Games were postponed to 23 July to 8 August 2021 due to the COVID-19 pandemic. It was the nation's twelfth appearance at the Summer Olympics, having appeared at all but two Games since its debut in 1968; Sierra Leone failed to register any athletes at the 1972 Summer Olympics in Munich and also joined the rest of the African nations to boycott the 1976 Summer Olympics in Montreal.

== Competitors ==
The following is the list of number of competitors in the Games.

Sport	Men	Women	Total
Athletics	0	1	1
Judo	1	0	1
Swimming	1	1	2
Total	2	2	4

== Athletics ==
Sierra Leone received a universality slot from the World Athletics to send a female track and field athlete to the Olympics.

Key

- Note–Ranks given for track events are within the athlete's heat only
- Q = Qualified for the next round
- q = Qualified for the next round as a fastest loser or, in field events, by position without achieving the qualifying target
- NR = National record
- N/A = Round not applicable for the event
- Bye = Athlete not required to compete in round

Track & road events

Athlete	Event	Heat		Quarterfinal		Semifinal		Final	
Athlete	Event	Result	Rank	Result	Rank	Result	Rank	Result	Rank
Maggie Barrie	Women's 100 m	11.53 SB	2 Q	11.45 SB	7	Did not advance			

== Judo ==
Sierra Leone received an invitation from the Tripartite Commission and the International Judo Federation to send Frederick Harris in the men's half-middleweight category (81 kg) to the Olympics, marking the nation's debut in the sport. However, Harris got disqualified after being overweight.

Athlete	Event	Round of 64	Round of 32	Round of 16	Quarterfinals	Semifinals	Repechage	Final / BM	
Athlete	Event	Opposition Result	Opposition Result	Opposition Result	Opposition Result	Opposition Result	Opposition Result	Opposition Result	Rank
Frederick Harris	Men's –81 kg	Bye	Faityev (AZE); L WO	Did not advance					

== Swimming ==
Sierra Leone received a universality invitation from FINA to send two top-ranked swimmers (one per gender) in their respective individual events to the Olympics, based on the FINA Points System of June 28, 2021.

Athlete	Event	Heat		Semifinal		Final	
Athlete	Event	Time	Rank	Time	Rank	Time	Rank
Joshua Wyse	Men's 50 m freestyle	27.90	71	Did not advance			
Tity Dumbuya	Women's 50 m freestyle	31.56	74	Did not advance			
