= Jodi Lambert =

Australian sprinter

Personal information
- Nationality: Australian
- Born: 1 September 1970 (age 55)

Sport
- Sport: Sprinting
- Event: 4 × 100 metres relay

Jodi Lambert (born 1 September 1970) is an Australian sprinter. She competed in the women's 4 × 100 metres relay at the 1996 Summer Olympics.
