= Edwige Abéna Fouda =

Cameroonian sprinter

Personal information
- Nationality: Cameroonian
- Born: 2 February 1973 (age 52)

Sport
- Sport: Sprinting
- Event: 4 × 100 metres relay

Edwige Marie Abéna Fouda (born 2 February 1973) is a Cameroonian sprinter. She competed in the women's 4 × 100 metres relay at the 1996 Summer Olympics.
