= Kwuanfah Inchareon =

Thai sprinter

Personal information
- Nationality: Thai
- Born: 20 April 1976 (age 50)

Sport
- Sport: Sprinting
- Event: 4 × 100 metres relay
Medal record
Women's athletics
Representing Thailand
Asian Championships
Bronze medal – third place	1995 Jakarta	4×100 m

Kwuanfah Inchareon (born 20 April 1976) is a Thai sprinter. She competed in the women's 4 × 100 metres relay at the 1996 Summer Olympics.
