= Supaporn Hubson =

Thai sprinter

Personal information
- Nationality: Thai
- Born: 1 September 1975 (age 50)

Sport
- Sport: Sprinting
- Event: 4 × 100 metres relay

Supaporn Hubson (born 1 September 1975) is a Thai sprinter. She competed in the women's 4 × 100 metres relay at the 1996 Summer Olympics.
