= Sierra Leone at the 2009 World Championships in Athletics =

- WA code: SLE

in Berlin
- Competitors: 2
- Medals: Gold 0 Silver 0 Bronze 0 Total 0

World Championships in Athletics appearances
- 1983; 1987; 1991; 1993; 1995; 1997; 1999; 2001; 2003–2005; 2007; 2009; 2011; 2013; 2015; 2017; 2019; 2022; 2023

Sierra Leone competed at the 2009 World Championships in Athletics from 15–23 August. A team of 2 athletes was announced in preparation for the competition.

== Team selection ==
Track and road events

Event	Athletes	
Event	Men	Women
400 metres	Bockarie Sesay	

Field and combined events

Event	Athletes	
Event	Men	Women
Long jump		Ola Sesay
