= Sama Fornah =

Sierra Leonean sprinter

Personal information
- Nationality: Sierra Leonean
- Born: 10 March 1972 (age 53)

Sport
- Sport: Sprinting
- Event: 4 × 100 metres relay

Sama Fornah (born 10 March 1972) is a Sierra Leonean sprinter. She competed in the women's 4 × 100 metres relay at the 1996 Summer Olympics.
