= Sunisa Kawrungruang =

Thai sprinter

Personal information
- Nationality: Thai
- Born: 29 January 1972 (age 53)

Sport
- Sport: Sprinting
- Event: 4 × 100 metres relay

Sunisa Kawrungruang (born 29 January 1972) is a Thai sprinter. She competed in the women's 4 × 100 metres relay at the 1996 Summer Olympics.
