= Haroun Korjie =

Sierra Leonean sprinter

Personal information
- Nationality: Sierra Leonean
- Born: 18 February 1972 (age 54)

Sport
- Sport: Sprinting
- Event: 4 × 400 metres relay

Haroun Korjie (born 18 February 1972) is a Sierra Leonean former sprinter. He competed in the men's 4 × 400 metres relay at the 1996 Summer Olympics.
