= Hawanatu Bangura =

Sierra Leonean sprinter

Hawanatu Bangura (born 2 January 1988) is a sprinter from Sierra Leone. She is listed at 4'8 tall and 115 lbs. Bangura represented her country at the 2004 Summer Olympics in the 100m dash in Athens, Greece. In Athens she finished 7th in her individual heat with a time of 12.11, .97 of a second off heat winner Vida Anim of Ghana.

Olympic Games
Preceded by Ekundayo Williams	Flag bearer for Sierra Leone; 2004 Athens	Succeeded by Solomon Bayoh
