= George Branche =

Sierra Leonean middle-distance runner

Personal information
- Nationality: Sierra Leonean
- Born: 3 April 1953 (age 73) Sierra Leone
- Height: 175 cm (5 ft 9 in)
- Weight: 63 kg (139 lb)

Sport
- Country: Sierra Leone
- Sport: Middle-distance running

George Branche is a Sierra Leonean Olympic middle-distance runner. He represented his country in the men's 1500 meters, men's 800 meters, and men's 4 x 400 metres relay at the 1980 Summer Olympics. His time was a 4:03.84 in the 1500, a 1:54.60 in the 800 heats, and a 3:25.00 in the relay.
