= Alifu Massaquoi =

Liberian long-distance runner

Personal information
- Nationality: Liberian; Sierra Leonean
- Born: 6 April 1937 (age 89) Liberia

Sport
- Sport: Long-distance running
- Event: Marathon

Alifu Albert Massaquoi (born 6 April 1937) is a Liberian and Sierra Leonean former long-distance runner. Representing Liberia, he competed in the marathon at the 1960 Summer Olympics, finishing in last place of all runners who completed the race. At the 1968 Summer Olympics, he again competed in the marathon as well as the 10,000 metres, but represented Sierra Leone. Massaquoi stills hold the Sierra Leonean 10,000 metres record with a time of 31:06.29, set during the 1970 British Commonwealth Games.
