= John Coker (boxer) =

Sierra Leonean boxer (born 1940)

Personal information
- Nationality: Sierra Leonean
- Born: 13 February 1940 (age 86) Freetown, Sierra Leone

Sport
- Sport: Boxing

John B. H. Coker (born 13 February 1940) is a Sierra Leonean former boxer. He competed in the men's heavyweight event at the 1968 Summer Olympics. He was also the flag bearer for Sierra Leone at the 1968 Games.
