= Francis Keita =

Sierra Leonean sprinter

Personal information
- Nationality: Sierra Leonean
- Born: 23 July 1970 (age 56)

Sport
- Sport: Sprinting
- Event: 4 × 100 metres relay

Francis Keita (born 23 July 1970) is a Sierra Leonean sprinter. He competed in the long jump and 4 × 100 metres relay at the 1988 Summer Olympics and the 4 × 100 metres relay at the 1992 Summer Olympics.

== Career ==
Keita entered in the long jump and 4 × 100 m at the 1988 Olympics. He jumped 6.87 metres to place 17th in his long jump qualifying round, and led off the Sierra Leonean relay team to place 7th in their heat.

In 1990, Keita set his long jump personal best of 7.05 metres.

Keita also entered in the long jump at the 1991 World University Games. He jumped 6.51 metres in qualification to place 32nd overall.

Before the 1992 Olympics, Keita moved to London and joined the North London Athletic Club.

At the 1992 Games, Keita led off the Sierra Leonean 4 × 100 m team in their heat. They ran 40.11 seconds to place 3rd, qualifying for the semi-finals. In the first semi-final, Keita again led off and his team ran 40.46 seconds to place 7th, failing to advance to the finals.

At the 1993 GRE Gold Cup, Keita won the 100 metres in 10.8 seconds. In August 1993, Keita led off for the Sierra Leonean World Championships 4 × 100 m team that finished 4th in their heat, running 40.69 seconds.

Keita entered in the 4 × 100 metres relay at the 1994 Commonwealth Games. Running third leg, his team originally split 39.71 seconds to qualify for the finals, but they were later disqualified after Keita's teammate Horace Dove-Edwin tested positive for stanozolol that afternoon.

Beginning in 1994, Keita trained in LaGrange, Georgia for two years in preparation for the 1996 Atlanta Olympics. He did not run at the 1996 Games.

Keita entered individually in the 60 metres at the 1997 World Indoor Championships. He ran 6.95 seconds to place 4th in his heat, failing to qualify for the semi-finals.

At the 1998 Commonwealth Games, Keita again entered in the 4 × 100 m relay. He led off the team placing 3rd in their heat, running 39.80 seconds to qualify for the finals. In the finals, KEita and his team placed 6th in 39.79 seconds.

He was part of a delegation of African athletes sent to train in Adelaide, Australia in preparation for the 2000 Sydney Olympics. He paid his own way to Australia for the trip.

While in Adelaide, Keita was part of a Sierra Leonean team that ran 40.2 seconds for 4 × 100 m and then 40.3 seconds despite Keita being hindered by an injury. They just missed the Olympic qualifying standard of 40.0 seconds and lamented the lack of support from their national federation. Keita and his team had to spend more than $10,000 in Australia including airfare and accommodations. Local Australians sympathized with Keita and offered to pay for some of his expenses, with over 100 calls offering help and over 20 offers of free room and board. Keita was not selected to represent Sierra Leone at the 2000 Summer Olympics despite his personal best times being "far superior" to their sole male entrant Alpha Kamara. Keita thought his team could have qualified for the Olympic finals.

== Personal life ==
Keita received a certificate for welding at the West Georgia Technical College with plans to open a practice.

He said he was struck by all the fast food places in America compared to his home country. He became a fan of professional basketball and began being accustomed to southern food and using terms like "y'all" while in the United States.

Keita was a member of the British Armed Forces.
