= David Kowah =

Sierra Leonean boxer (born 1971)

Personal information
- Nationality: Sierra Leonean
- Born: 6 August 1971 (age 53)

Sport
- Sport: Boxing

David Kowah (born 6 August 1971) is a Sierra Leonean boxer. He competed in the men's light heavyweight event at the 1996 Summer Olympics.

During the 1996 Summer Olympics, he was knocked out during the Round of 16, suffering a defeat in his inaugural fight of the competition against the American boxer Antonio Tarver. In the final ranking, he secured the 9th position.
