= Josephus Thomas =

Sierra Leonean sprinter

Personal information
- Nationality: Sierra Leonean
- Born: 11 July 1971 (age 55) Bureh Town, Sierra Leone
- Height: 186 cm (6 ft 1 in)
- Weight: 82 kg (181 lb)

Sport
- Sport: Athletics
- Event: Sprinting
- Club: Woodford Green AC
Medal record
Representing Sierra Leone
Summer Universiade
Silver medal – second place	1991 Sheffield	4x100m relay

Josephus Thomas (born 11 July 1971) is a Sierra Leonean sprinter. He competed in the men's 4 × 100 metres relay at the 1996 Summer Olympics.

== Biography ==
Thomas competed for the Woodford Green AC in Woodford, London. With a personal best of 10.32 seconds, he was the Sierra Leonean record-holder over 100 metres before he was injured at the 2004 AAA Indoor Championships. Thomas also ran a wind-assisted 10.19 time in Fullerton, California that was not eligible for records.

Thomas finished third in both the 100 metres and 200 metres at the British 1997 AAA Championships.

Thomas has a twin brother Joselyn Thomas, who competed in the 2002 Commonwealth Games men's 100 m and other international competitions with Josephus. He said that the Sierra Leonean athletics association would not send him enough resources for training.
