= Sierra Leone at the 2024 Summer Olympics =

- IOC code: SLE
- NOC: National Olympic Committee of Sierra Leone

in Paris, France 26 July 2024 – 11 August 2024
- Competitors: 4 (1 man and 3 women) in 3 sports
- Flag bearers: Joshua Wyse & Mariama Koroma
- Medals: Gold 0 Silver 0 Bronze 0 Total 0

Summer Olympics appearances (overview)
- 1968; 1972–1976; 1980; 1984; 1988; 1992; 1996; 2000; 2004; 2008; 2012; 2016; 2020; 2024

Sierra Leone competed at the 2024 Summer Olympics in Paris, which took place from 26 July 2024 to 11 August 2024. It was the nation's thirteenth appearance at the Summer Olympics, having appeared at all but two Games since its debut in 1968; Sierra Leone failed to register any athletes at the 1972 Summer Olympics in Munich and also joined the rest of the African nations to boycott the 1976 Summer Olympics in Montreal.

== Competitors ==
The following is the list of number of competitors in the Games.

Sport	Men	Women	Total
Athletics	0	1	1
Judo	0	1	1
Swimming	1	1	2
Total	1	3	4

== Athletics ==
Sierra Leone sent one sprinter to compete at the 2024 Summer Olympics.

Key

- Note–Ranks given for track events are within the athlete's heat only
- Q = Qualified for the next round
- q = Qualified for the next round as a fastest loser or, in field events, by position without achieving the qualifying target
- NR = National record
- N/A = Round not applicable for the event
- Bye = Athlete not required to compete in round

Track events

Athlete	Event	Preliminary		Heat		Semifinal		Final	
Athlete	Event	Result	Rank	Result	Rank	Result	Rank	Result	Rank
Georgiana Sesay	Women's 100 m	11.99 q	4	12.15	9	Did not advance			

== Judo ==
Sierra Leone qualified one judoka for the following weight class at the Games. Mariama Koroma (women's 57 kg) qualified for the games through the allocations of universality places.

Athlete	Event	Round of 32	Round of 16	Quarterfinals	Semifinals	Repechage	Final / BM	
Athlete	Event	Opposition Result	Opposition Result	Opposition Result	Opposition Result	Opposition Result	Opposition Result	Rank
Mariama Koroma	Women's –57 kg	Lien C-l (TPE); L 00–10	Did not advance					

== Swimming ==
Sierra Leone sent two swimmers to compete at the 2024 Paris Olympics, following the allocation of universality places.

Athlete	Event	Heat		Semifinal		Final	
Athlete	Event	Time	Rank	Time	Rank	Time	Rank
Joshua Wyse	Men's 50 m freestyle	27.11	62	Did not advance			
Olamide Sam	Women's 50 m freestyle	42.87	78	Did not advance			

Qualifiers for the latter rounds (Q) of all events were decided on a time only basis, therefore positions shown are overall results versus competitors in all heats.
