= Frank Turay =

Sierra Leonean sprinter

Personal information
- Nationality: Sierra Leonean
- Born: 20 December 1976 (age 49)

Sport
- Sport: Sprinting
- Event: 4 × 400 metres relay

Frank Sima Turay Tucker (born 20 December 1976) is a Sierra Leonean sprinter.

== Career ==
He competed in the men's 4 × 400 metres relay at the 1996 Summer Olympics.
