= Ibrahim Turay =

Sierra Leonean sprinter

Ibrahim Turay (born 4 September 1993 in Waterloo, Sierra Leone) is a Sierra Leonean runner who competed at the 2012 Summer Olympics in the 200 m event. He was eliminated in the first round but finished with a personal best time of 21.90.
