= Sia Kamanor =

Sierra Leonean sprinter

Personal information
- Nationality: Sierra Leonean
- Born: 9 March 1977 (age 48)

Sport
- Sport: Sprinting
- Event: 4 × 100 metres relay

Sia Kamanor (born 9 March 1977) is a Sierra Leonean sprinter. She competed in the women's 4 × 100 metres relay at the 1996 Summer Olympics.
