= Eugenia Osho-Williams =

Sierra Leonean sprinter

Personal information
- Nationality: Sierra Leonean
- Born: 19 January 1961 (age 64)

Sport
- Sport: Sprinting
- Event: 100 metres

Eugenia Osho-Williams (born 19 January 1961) is a Sierra Leonean sprinter. She competed in the 100 metres at the 1980 Summer Olympics and the 1984 Summer Olympics. She was the first woman to represent Sierra Leone at the Olympics.
