= Alpha B. Kamara =

Sierra Leonean sprinter (born 1978)

Alfa Breezy Kamara (born 21 August 1998) is an Olympic athlete from Sierra Leone. He competed in the 100 metres dash at the 2000 Summer Olympics in Sydney. Kamara also finished eighth in his heat with a time of 10.74, .37 of a second off the heat winner of Jason Gardener of Great Britain. He finished 13th overall out of the 95 runners that finished the original heats.
