= Prince Amara =

Sierra Leonean sprinter

Personal information
- Nationality: Sierra Leonean
- Born: 15 March 1973 (age 53)
- Height: 180 cm (5 ft 11 in)
- Weight: 70 kg (154 lb)

Sport
- Sport: Athletics
- Events: Sprinting, 400m
- Club: Action Star, Freetown / Woodford Green AC

Prince Amara (born 15 March 1973) is a Sierra Leonean sprinter. He competed in the men's 4 × 400 metres relay at the 1996 Summer Olympics.

At the 1996 Olympics, Amara was selected to run the anchor leg on the Sierra Leonean team. They finished 8th in their heat and did not advance to the finals.

Amara was also an accomplished 800 metres runner. At a 1995 race in Cwmbran, South Wales, United Kingdom, Amara ran 1:51.23 to set the Sierra Leonean record. As of 2025, his record still stands.

After retirement, Amara went on to work for the Sierra Leone Amateur Athletic Association, greeting athletes at the 2012 Summer Olympics in London.
