= Pierre Lisk =

Sierra Leonean sprinter

Personal information
- Nationality: Sierra Leonean
- Born: 22 November 1971 (age 54)

Sport
- Sport: Sprinting
- Event: 200 metres

Pierre C. O. Lisk (born 22 November 1971) is a Sierra Leonean sprinter. He competed in the men's 200 metres at the 1996 Summer Olympics.
