= Baba Ibrahim Suma-Keita =

Sierra Leonean long-distance runner (1947–2020)

Personal information
- Nationality: Sierra Leonean
- Born: 20 April 1947
- Died: 18 July 2020 (aged 73)

Sport
- Sport: Long-distance running
- Event: Marathon

Baba Ibrahim Suma-Keita (20 April 1947 – 18 July 2020) was a Sierra Leonean long-distance runner. He competed in the marathon at the 1980 Summer Olympics and the 1988 Summer Olympics.
