= David Sawyerr =

Sierra Leonean sprinter

Personal information
- Nationality: Sierra Leonean
- Born: 6 May 1961 (age 65)

Sport
- Sport: Sprinting
- Event: 200 metres

David Peter Sawyerr (born 6 May 1961) is a Sierra Leonean sprinter. He competed in the men's 200 metres at the 1984 Summer Olympics. Sawyerr was the flag bearer for Sierra Leone in the opening ceremony. He is considered one of Sierra Leone's "most iconic sprint champions".
