= George Wyndham (table tennis) =

Sierra Leonean para table tennis player (1990–2026)

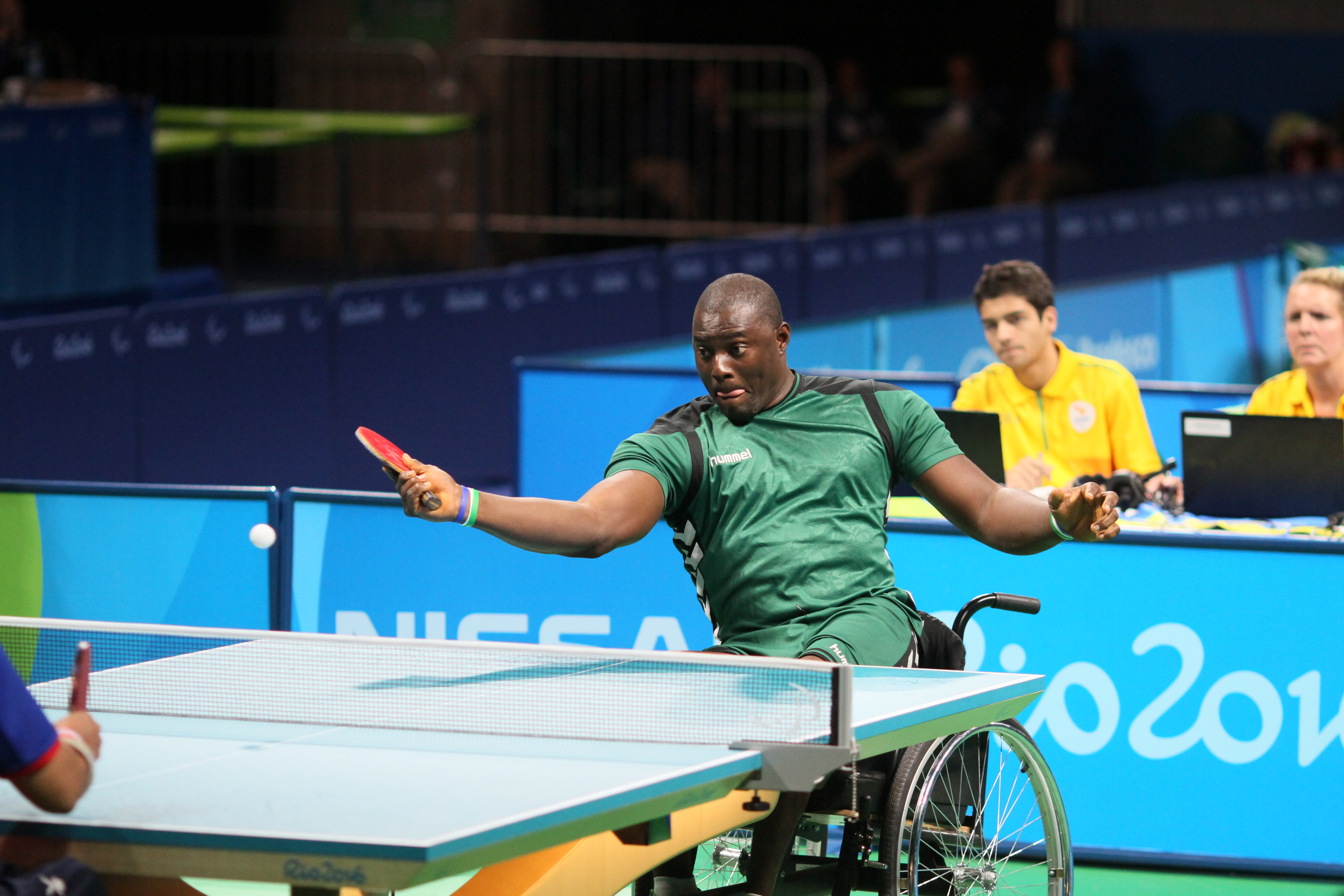
- Wyndham in 2016 Summer Paralympics

Personal information
- Born: 23 March 1990 Kenema, Sierra Leone
- Died: 22 May 2026 (aged 36)

Sport
- Sport: Para table tennis
- Disability: Polio
Medal record
Representing Sierra Leone
African Championships
Bronze medal – third place	2013 Sharm el Sheikh	Singles C4
Bronze medal – third place	2015 Agadir	Singles C4

George Wyndham (23 March 1990 – 22 May 2026) was a Sierra Leonean para table tennis player. He competed at the 2016 Summer Paralympics. He was the only Sierra Leonean athlete who competed. Wyndham was able to compete with financial help from the United Nations Development Programme.

In the 2016 Summer Paralympics, Wyndham competed in Class 4 of the Men's Table Tennis Individual Event. Wyndham was eliminated from the tournament in the preliminary round of the tournament after coming 3rd in Group F, losing both his matches to Zhang Yan of China (11–2, 11–6, 9–11, 11–5) and to Wanchai Chaiwut of Thailand (11–2, 11–9, 11–9).

Wyndham was paralysed after contracting polio as a child. He died on 22 May 2026, at the age of 36.
