= Tom Ganda =

Sierra Leonean sprinter

Personal information
- Nationality: Sierra Leonean
- Born: 10 September 1972 (age 54)
- Height: 182 cm (6 ft 0 in)
- Weight: 77 kg (170 lb)

Sport
- Sport: Athletics
- Event: Sprinting

Thomas Ganda (born 10 September 1972) is a Sierra Leonean sprinter. He competed in the men's 4 × 100 metres relay at the 1996 Summer Olympics.

Ganda finished second behind Australian Dave Culbert in the long jump event at the British 1992 AAA Championships.
