= Benjamin Grant =

Sierra Leonean sprinter

Personal information
- Nationality: Sierra Leonean
- Born: 15 April 1970 (age 56)

Sport
- Sport: Sprinting
- Events: 110 metre hurdles, 4 × 100 metres relay
Medal record
Representing Sierra Leone
Summer Universiade
Silver medal – second place	1991 Sheffield	4x100m relay

Benjamin Grant (born 15 April 1970) is a Sierra Leonean hurdler. He competed in the men's 4 × 100 metres relay at the 1988 Summer Olympics.
