= Ola Sesay =

Sierra Leonean long jumper

Personal information
- Born: 30 May 1979 (age 46) Freetown, Sierra Leone
- Height: 1.76 m (5 ft 9 1/2 in)
- Weight: 64 kg (141 lb)

Sport
- Country: Sierra Leone
- Sport: Athletics
- Event: Long jump

Ola Sesay (born 30 May 1979 in Freetown, Sierra Leone) is a Sierra Leonean long jumper. She competed at the 2012 Summer Olympics and was the flag bearer of Sierra Leone during the 2012 Summer Olympics opening ceremony.

Sesay was an All-American jumper for the North Carolina Tar Heels track and field program, finishing 8th in the long jump at the 2001 NCAA Division I Indoor Track and Field Championships. Before transferring to North Carolina, she was also an All-American for the Kentucky Wildcats track and field team.

== Competition record ==
Year	Competition	Venue	Position	Notes
Representing Sierra Leone
2009	World Championships	Berlin, Germany	27th (q)	6.23 m
2010	Commonwealth Games	Delhi, India	5th	6.30 m
2011	World Championships	Daegu, South Korea	32nd (q)	5.94 m
2012	Olympic Games	London, United Kingdom	23rd (q)	6.22 m

Olympic Games
Preceded by Solomon Bayoh	Flag bearer for Sierra Leone; 2012 London	Succeeded by Bunturabie Jalloh
