= Felix Sandy =

Sierra Leonean sprinter

Personal information
- Nationality: Sierra Leonean
- Born: 16 December 1964 (age 61) Freetown, Sierra Leone

Sport
- Sport: Sprinting
- Event: 400 metres

Felix Sandy (born 16 December 1964) is a Sierra Leonean sprinter. He competed in the men's 400 metres at the 1988 Summer Olympics. He has been described as "arguably Sierra Leone's all-time greatest track runner".

In college, Sandy ran for the Azusa Pacific College track team, where he competed in the 100 and 200 metres.
