= Eunice Barber =

Sierra Leonean-French athletics competitor

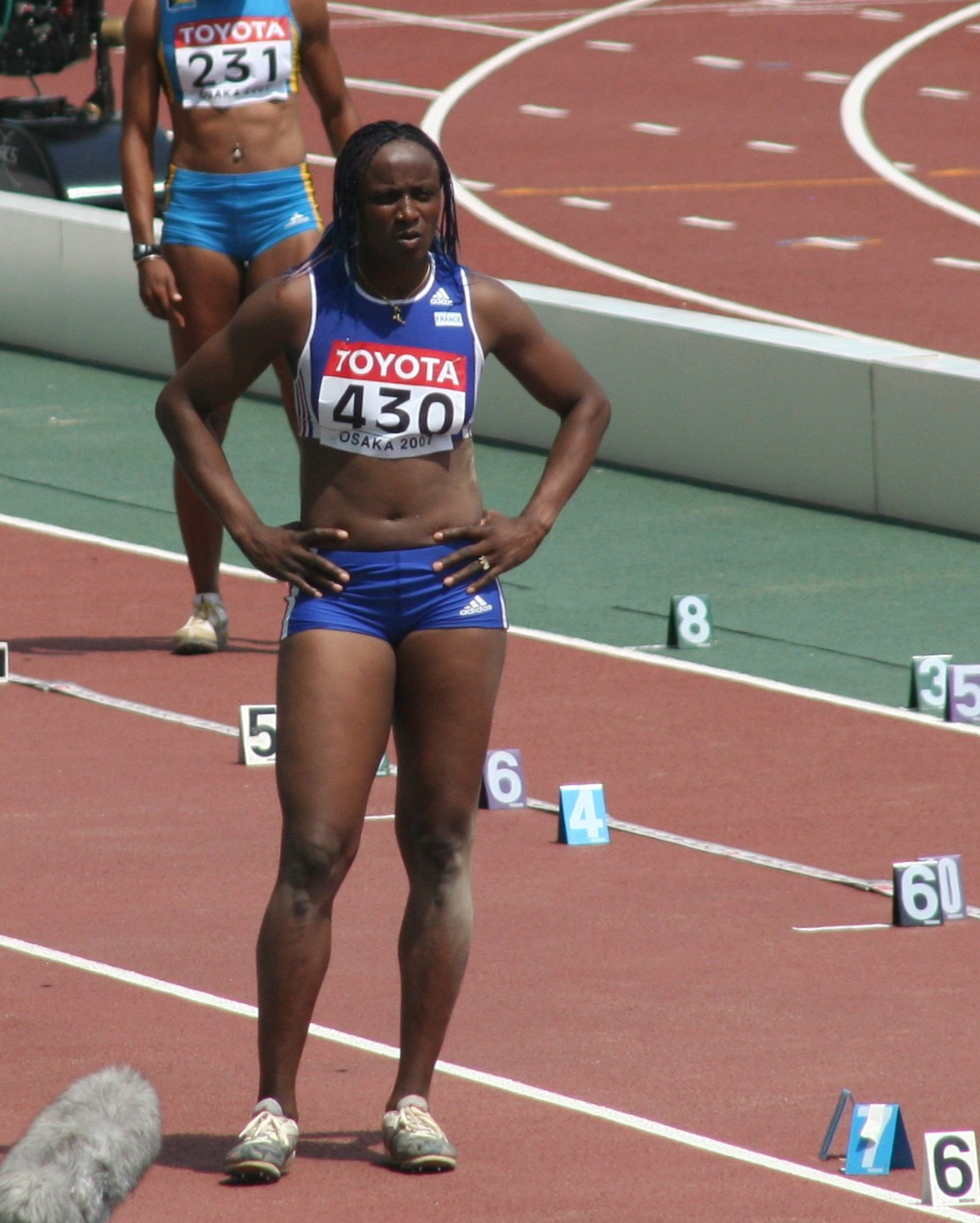
- Barber at the 2007 World Championships

Medal record

Women's athletics

Representing Sierra Leone

All-Africa Games
Gold medal – first place	1995 Harare	Long jump

Representing France

World Championships
Gold medal – first place	1999 Seville	Heptathlon
Gold medal – first place	2003 Paris	Long jump
Silver medal – second place	2003 Paris	Heptathlon
Silver medal – second place	2005 Helsinki	Heptathlon
Bronze medal – third place	2005 Helsinki	Long jump

Eunice Claudia Barber (born 17 November 1974, in Freetown, Sierra Leone) is a Sierra Leonean-French athlete competing in heptathlon and long jump. Barber initially competed for Sierra Leone and then for France from 1999 onwards. She won the heptathlon at the World Athletics Championships in 1999, the long jump in 2003 and finished second in heptathlon in 2003 and 2005.

== Debut ==
Barber participated in the 1992 Olympic Games in Barcelona in the heptathlon and 100 m hurdles. She also participated in the heptathlon at the 1993 World Championships in Stuttgart, but failed to finish.

== Breakthrough ==
At the 1995 World Championships in Gothenburg, she beat her personal bests in six (out of seven) events in the heptathlon and finished in fourth place. The same year, she won the gold medal in long jump at the All-Africa Games in Harare. The next year, she finished fifth in the heptathlon at the 1996 Olympic Games in Atlanta. In those games, she also participated in the long jump (but did not qualify for the final).

== Duels with Denise Lewis ==
Because of an injury, Eunice Barber could not compete in 1998. On 3 February 1999, she acquired French nationality by naturalization (she has trained and lived in France since 1992).

In the 1999 World Championships heptathlon in Seville, she beat Denise Lewis by just 137 points with a personal best total of 6861 points with Lewis safely in second by a further 224 points to third placed Ghada Shouaa.

In 2000, Eunice Barber recorded the year's best score of 6842 points. However, during the Olympic Games in Sydney, an injury forces her to withdraw from the competition after five events. Denise Lewis wins the heptathlon.

== Duels with Carolina Klüft ==
At the 2003 World Championships in Paris, Carolina Klüft captured her first world title, in front of Barber's adopted home crowd. Klüft finished with 7001 points, ahead of Barber, with 6755 points. However, Barber bounced back to win the long jump, with her last-round attempt.

At the 2005 World Championships in Athletics in Helsinki, Klüft and Barber battle again for the gold medal. Once again Klüft wins (with 6,887 points) and Barber takes the second place (with 6,824 points). Barber failed to defend her long jump crown, but took a bronze in the event.

At the 2006 European Championships in Athletics in Gothenburg, Barber hoped to even the score with Klüft, by beating her in front of her home crowd. However, Barber was forced to withdraw on day one because of a hip injury.

Sporting positions
Preceded by (United Kingdom) Denise Lewis	Women's Heptathlon Best Year Performance; 1999 — 2001	Succeeded by (Sweden) Carolina Klüft
Preceded by (Sweden) Carolina Klüft	Women's Heptathlon Best Year Performance; 2005	Succeeded by (Sweden) Carolina Klüft
