= National Olympic Committee of Sierra Leone =

National Olympic Committee

- Country: Sierra Leone
- Code: SLE
- Created: 1964
- Recognized: 1964
- Continental Association: ANOCA
- Headquarters: Freetown
- President: Patrick Coker
- Secretary General: Joseph Nyande
- Website: nocsalone.org

The National Olympic Committee of Sierra Leone (IOC code: SLE) is the National Olympic Committee representing Sierra Leone. It was created and recognised by the IOC in 1964.

Sierra Leone made its debut at the 1968 Summer Olympics in Mexico City where it was represented by three athletes.

== Presidents of Committee ==
- 11 May 2013–present – Patrick Coker

== See also ==
- Sierra Leone at the Olympics
- Sierra Leone at the Commonwealth Games
