= Athletics at the 1997 Central American Games =

Athletics at the VI Central American Games
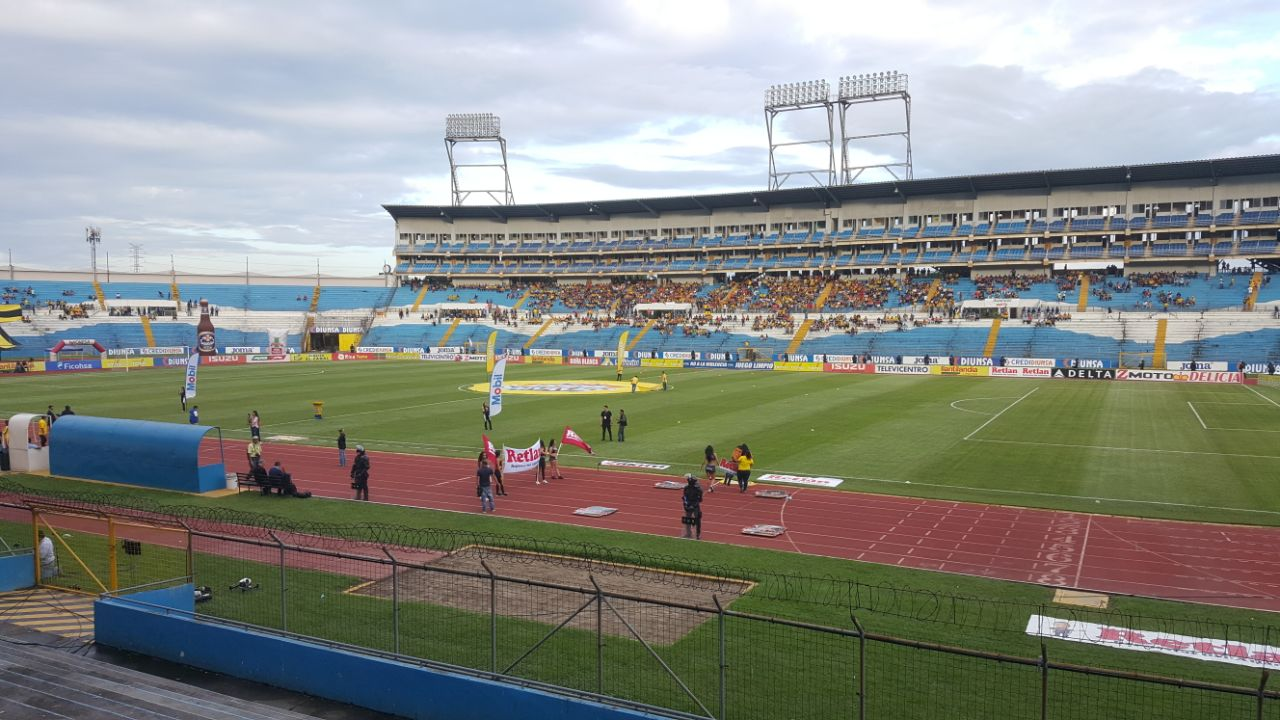
- Estadio Olímpico Metropolitano
- Dates: December 9-14
- Host city: San Pedro Sula, Honduras
- Venue: Estadio Olímpico Metropolitano
- Level: Senior
- Events: 46 (24 men, 22 women)

Athletics competitions at the 1997 Central American Games were held at the Estadio Olímpico Metropolitano in San Pedro Sula, Honduras, between December 9 and 14, 1997.

A total of 46 events were contested, 24 by men and 22 by women.

== Medal summary ==
Gold medal winners were published. A couple of medals and results could be retrieved from the archive of Costa Rican newspaper La Nación, and from Nicaraguan newspaper La Prensa. A complete list of medal winners can be found on the MásGoles webpage (click on "JUEGOS CENTROAMERICANOS" in the low right corner). Gold medalists were also published in other sources.

=== Men ===
Event	Gold		Silver		Bronze	
100 metres (wind: +1.2 m/s)	Joseph Colville (CRC)	10.61	Julio Roque (ESA)	10.70	Mario Blanco (GUA)	10.75
200 metres (wind: -1.9 m/s)	Rubén Benítez (ESA)	21.47	José Meneses (GUA)	21.97	Mario Blanco (GUA)	22.15
400 metres	Álvaro James (CRC)	47.76	Marco McKoy (BIZ)	48.72	Frederick Marssiah (BIZ)	48.96
800 metres	Carlos Madrigal (CRC)	1:52.67	Jefry Pérez (CRC)	1:53.89	Luis Padilla (NCA)	1:54.55
1500 metres	Jefry Pérez (CRC)	3:56.23	Ronald Arias (ESA)	3:56.66	Adrian Jorgensen (BIZ)	3:58.51
5000 metres	Iván Gómez (GUA)	14:38.75	Jhonny Loría (CRC)	14:53.55	Víctor Velázquez (GUA)	15:04.50
10,000 metres	Iván Gómez (GUA)	31:02.38	José Amado García (GUA)	33:05.17	William Aguirre (NCA)	33:34.62
Marathon	Luis Martínez (GUA)	2:48:32	Miguel Vargas (CRC)	2:48:47	Dagoberto Pérez (ESA)	2:51:06
110 metres hurdles (wind: -0.4 m/s)	Alex Foster (CRC)	14.62 GR	Alejandro Navarro (ESA)	15.13	Francisco Flores (HON)	15.47
400 metres hurdles	Alex Foster (CRC)	52.91	Alejandro Navarro (ESA)	53.02	Francisco Flores (HON)	54.67
3000 metres steeplechase	Jhonny Loría (CRC)	8:54.43 GR	Hugo Allan García (GUA)		Selvin Molineros (GUA)	
4 x 100 metres relay	El Salvador; Edgardo Serpas; Julio César Roque; Carlos Toledo; Rubén Benítez	40.90 GR	Guatemala; Marvin Alvarado; José Tinoco; José Meneses; Mario Blanco	41.75	Costa Rica; Alex Foster; Minor Aguilar; Joseph Colville; Marvin Ramírez	42.65
4 x 400 metres relay	El Salvador; Edgardo Serpas; Carlos Toledo; Rubén Benítez; Alejandro Navarro	3:15.74 GR	Belize; Michael McKoy; Jayson Jones; Elston Shaw; Albert Wade	3:16.80	Costa Rica; José Abbot; Alex Foster; Álvaro James; Carlos Madrigal	3:17.69
20 Kilometres Road Walk	Julio Martínez (GUA)	1:35:45	Roberto Oscal (GUA)	1:35:47	Guillermo Vásquez (ESA)	1:45:56
35 Kilometres Road Walk	Julio César Urías (GUA)	2:55:34	Hugo López (GUA)	2:58:49	Carlos Rivera (ESA)	3:48:46
High jump	Michael Periche (CRC)	2.06	José Barahona (PAN)	2.00	Alton Berry (BIZ)	2.00
Pole vault	Sixto Anchetta (ESA)	4.15	Juan Ramírez (ESA)	4.10	Jorge Flores (HON)	4.00
Long jump	Angelo Iannuzzelli (ESA)	7.16	Elston Shaw (BIZ)	6.94	Albert Wade (BIZ)	6.88
Triple jump	Daniel Flores (HON)	14.91	Guillermo Uclés (HON)	14.61	Rolando Lewis (CRC)	14.44
Shot put	Jaime Comandari (ESA)	15.88 GR	Edson Monzón (GUA)	14.28	Henry Santos (GUA)	13.65
Discus throw	Herbert Rodríguez (ESA)	43.38	Jaime Comandari (ESA)	40.70	Nelson Chavarría (CRC)	40.26
Hammer throw	Enrique Reina (HON)	51.72	Guillermo Morales (ESA)	51.46	Raúl Rivera (GUA)	49.88
Javelin throw	Rigoberto Calderón (NCA)	71.00 GR	Fernando Palomo (ESA)	64.56	Nelson Ocón (NCA)	57.82
Decathlon	Andrés Bondurant (GUA)	6105	Marco McKoy (BIZ)	6032	Allan Brown (CRC)	5844

=== Women ===
Event	Gold		Silver		Bronze	
100 metres (wind: +2.4 m/s)	Pastora Chávez (HON)	11.8	Rita Alcázar (PAN)	11.9	Zoila Stewart (CRC)	11.9
200 metres (wind: -2.8 m/s)	Rita Alcázar (PAN)	25.10	Pastora Chávez (HON)	25.17	Mera Belisle (BIZ)	25.36
400 metres	Zoila Stewart (CRC)	54.74 GR	Arely Franco (ESA)	56.85	Rosa Évora (ESA)	57.72
800 metres	Rosa Évora (ESA)	2:11.13 GR	Elizabeth Zaragoza (ESA)	2:12.81	Zolveik Ruiz (PAN)	2:15.78
1500 metres	Marcela Jackson (CRC)	4:36.85 GR	Elizabeth Zaragoza (ESA)	4:37.53	Elsa Monterroso (GUA)	4:39.31
5000 metres	Elizabeth Zaragoza (ESA)	17:57.60	Elsa Monterroso (GUA)	18:00.5	Kriscia García (ESA)	18:38.8
10,000 metres	Kriscia García (ESA)	38:36.39	Edith Ramírez (HON)	38:56.52	Angelina Turcios (GUA)	39:00.29
Marathon	Gina Coello (HON)	3:23:51	Marta Montes (ESA)	3:26:41	María Hidalgo (ESA)	3:30:02
100 metres hurdles (wind: +0.7 m/s)	Verónica Quijano (ESA)	15.30	Velveth Moreno (PAN)	15.40	Aura Amaya (ESA)	15.60
400 metres hurdles	Velveth Moreno (PAN)	61.89 GR	Verónica Quijano (ESA)	62.78	Arely Franco (ESA)	64.30
4 x 100 metres relay	El Salvador; Marcela Navarro; Leticia Osorto; Aura Amaya; Rosa Évora	47.78 GR	Panama; Itza Sánchez; Zolveik Ruiz; Erika Chifundo; Rita Alcázar	48.16	Costa Rica; Zoila Stewart; Gabriela Rodríguez; Mariela Leal; Andrea Camacho	48.66
4 x 400 metres relay	Panama; Itza Sánchez; Rita Alcázar; Zolveik Ruiz; Velveth Moreno	3:49.75 GR	El Salvador; Leticia Osorto; Arely Franco; Rosa Évora; Verónica Quijano	3:50.07	Costa Rica; Marcela Jackson; Karina Lewis; Zoila Stewart; Gabriela Rodríguez	3:54.97
10 Kilometres Road Walk	Ivis Martínez (ESA)	50:27 GR	Natividad Collado (GUA)	50:48	Magdalena Guzmán (ESA)	56:54
High jump	Ana Quiñónez (GUA)	1.75	Silvia Cob (CRC)	1.63	Ivonne Montoya (CRC)	1.60
Pole vault	Glenda Aguilar (HON)	2.45	Mauren Calvo (CRC)	2.40	Gloria Ramos (ESA)	2.20
Long jump	Sabrina Asturias (GUA)	5.46 GR	Ana Traña (NCA)	5.44	María Fleischmann (GUA)	5.33
Triple jump	María Fleischmann (GUA)	12.06	Ana Traña (NCA)	11.72	María José Paiz (GUA)	11.28
Shot put	Eva María Dimas (ESA)	12.78 GR	Verónica Monzón (GUA)	11.76	Damaris Ulloa (NCA)	10.65
Discus throw	Eva María Dimas (ESA)	46.48 GR	María Lourdes Ruiz (NCA)	40.88	Ana Lucía Espinoza (GUA)	37.88
Hammer throw	Eva María Dimas (ESA)	47.74 GR	Sandra Valiente (ESA)	42.96	Ana Lucía Espinoza (GUA)	38.88
Javelin throw	Ana Hernández (CRC)	38.36	Raisa Domínguez (PAN)	37.18	Leslie Padilla (HON)	34.02
Heptathlon	María Cuadra (ESA)	4717 GR	Sandra Olverios (GUA)	4021	Karla Guardado (ESA)	3315

== Medal table (unofficial) ==
* Host nation ( Honduras)

Rank	Nation	Gold	Silver	Bronze	Total
1	El Salvador	17	15	11	43
2	Costa Rica	11	5	9	25
3	Guatemala	9	11	12	32
4	Honduras*	5	3	4	12
5	Panama	3	5	1	9
6	Nicaragua	1	3	4	8
7	Belize	0	4	5	9
Totals (7 entries)		46	46	46	138
