= Athletics at the 1994 Central American Games =

Athletics at the V Central American Games
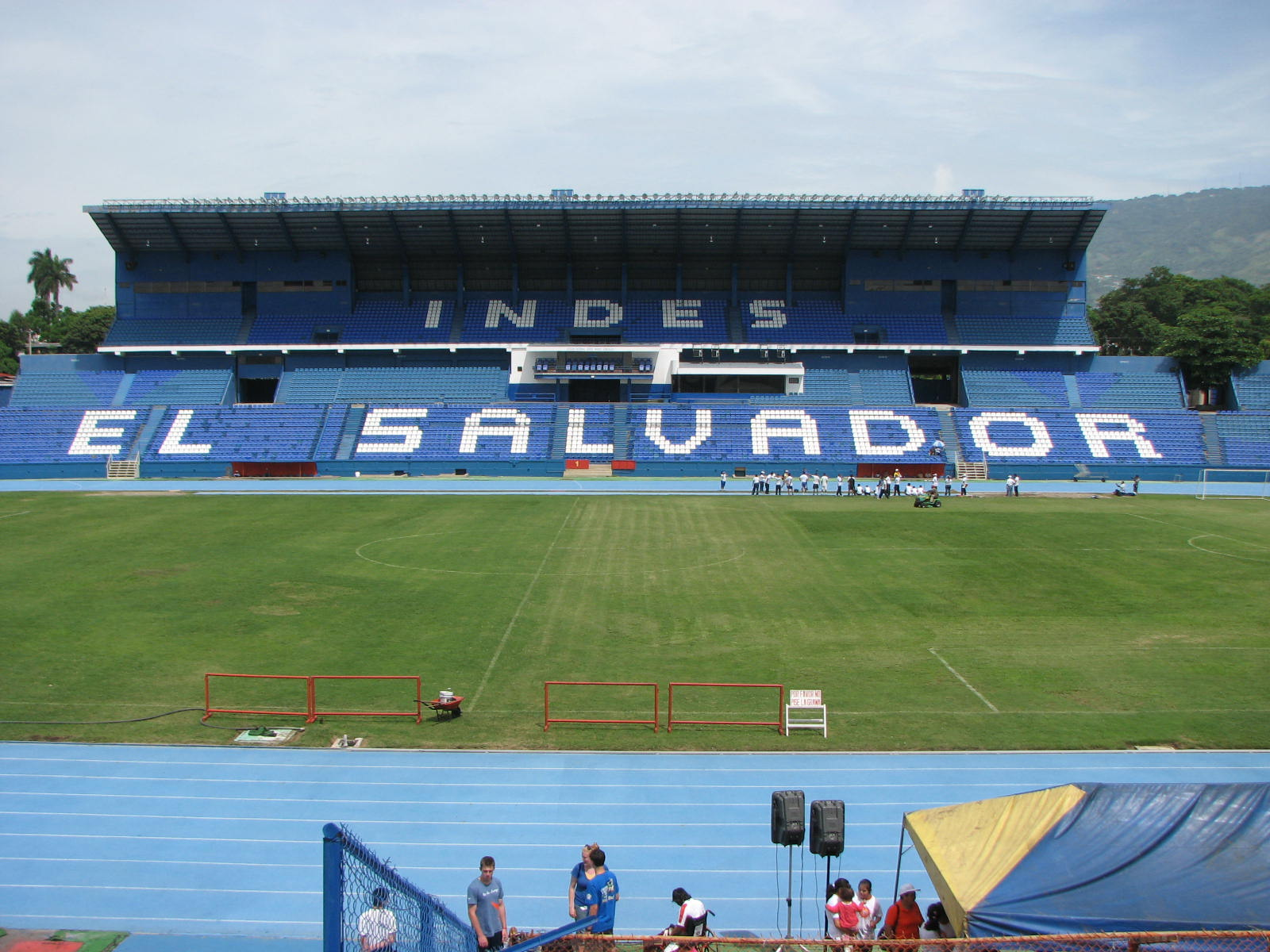
- Tribune of National Stadium Jorge "Magico " Gonzalez, located in San Salvador
- Dates: November - December 1
- Host city: San Salvador, El Salvador
- Venue: Estadio Flor Blanca
- Level: Senior
- Events: 45 (24 men, 21 women)
- Participation: 7 nations

Athletics competitions at the 1994 Central American Games were held at the Estadio Flor Blanca in San Salvador, El Salvador, in November – December 1, 1994.

A total of 45 events were contested, 24 by men and 21 by women.

== Medal summary ==
Gold medal winners and their results were published. A complete list of medal winners can be found on the MásGoles webpage (click on "JUEGOS CENTROAMERICANOS" in the low right corner). Gold medalists were also published in other sources.

=== Men ===
Event	Gold		Silver	Bronze
100 metresl	Michael Stewart (CRC)	10.96	Minor Aguilar (CRC)	Elston Shaw (BIZ)
200 metres	Michael Stewart (CRC)	21.67	Randolph Foster (CRC)	Carlos Daley (PAN)
400 metres	Randolph Foster (CRC)	49.86	Isaac Rojas (CRC)	Carlos Toledo (ESA)
800 metres	Carlos Mairena (NCA)	1:53.30	Juan Tapia (PAN)	Luis Martínez (GUA)
1500 metres	Luis Martínez (GUA)	3:52.05	Juan Tapia (PAN)	Carlos Mairena (NCA)
5000 metres	Iván Gómez (GUA)	14:22.71	José Molina (CRC)	Marcos Juárez (GUA)
10,000 metres	José Morales (GUA)	29:31.9	José Molina (CRC)	Alberto Paredes (GUA)
Marathon	William Aguirre (NCA)	2:32:03	José Linares (GUA)	Jhonny Loría (CRC)
3000 metres steeplechase	Luis Martínez (GUA)	9:16.80	Lázaro Vásquez (GUA)	Adolfo Costa Figueroa (CRC)
110 metres hurdles	Alex Foster (CRC)	14.89	Rudel Franco (ESA)	Erick Krings (GUA)
400 metres hurdles	Alex Foster (CRC)	52.52	Erick Krings (GUA)	Francisco Flores (HON)
4 x 100 metres relay	Costa Rica; Marlon Grainger; Randolph Foster; Michael Stewart; Minor Aguilar	41.87	Guatemala; Erick Krings; Marvin Alvarado; José Tinoco; Tito Vides	Belize; Hyde; Lindford Castillo; Elston Shaw; Lamb
4 x 400 metres relay	Costa Rica; Allan Brown; Minor Aguilar; Randolph Foster; Alex Foster	3:16.55	Guatemala; Erick Krings; Arisk Perdomo; Rivera; Marvin Alvarado	El Salvador; Centeno; Carlos Toledo; Quintanilla; Mauricio Carranza
20 Kilometres Road Walk	Julio Martínez (GUA)	1:27:45	Hugo López (GUA)	Francisco Guzmán (ESA)
50 Kilometres Road Walk	Julio César Urías (GUA)	4:08:21	Nelson Fúnez (GUA)	Luis Rodríguez (ESA)
High jump	José Barahona (PAN)	2.08	Miguel Monge (CRC)	Luis Flores (HON)
Pole vault	Lucas Miranda (ESA)	4.00	Jorge Flores (HON)	Héctor Salvatierra (GUA)
Long jump	Tito Vides (GUA)	7.26	Elston Shaw (BIZ)	Alfredo Williams (NCA)
Triple jump	Daniel Flores (HON)	14.70	Howard Pandy (HON)	Marlon Grainger (CRC)
Shot put	Jaime Comandari (ESA)	15.37	José Castillo (ESA)	Fernando Alonzo (GUA)
Discus throw	Herbert Rodríguez (ESA)	47.52	Fernando Alonzo (GUA)	Jaime Comandari (ESA)
Hammer throw	Enrique Reina (HON)	54.24	Guillermo Morales (ESA)	Herbert Rodríguez (ESA)
Javelin throw	Rigoberto Calderón (NCA)	68.14	Nelson Ocón (NCA)	Luis Bermúdez (CRC)
Decathlon	Jorge Flores (HON)	5873	Cecil Koehling (HON)	Oscar Alpízar (CRC)

=== Women ===
Event	Gold		Silver	Bronze
100 metres	Zoila Stewart (CRC)	12.21	Pastora Chávez (HON)	Amrei Baumgarten (GUA)
200 metres	Ericka Cyrus (CRC)	25.30	Amrei Baumgarten (GUA)	Leticia Osorto (ESA)
400 metres	Zoila Stewart (CRC)	55.52	Arely Franco (ESA)	Rosa Évora (ESA)
800 metres	Zoila Stewart (CRC)	2:14.0	Marcela Jackson (CRC)	Rosa Évora (ESA)
1500 metres	Elsa Monterroso (GUA)	4:42.80	Guadalupe Zúñiga (CRC)	Thelma Zúñiga (CRC)
3000 metres	Thelma Zúñiga (CRC)	10:10.64	Elsa Monterroso (GUA)	Aura Morales (GUA)
10,000 metres	Thelma Zúñiga (CRC)	36:27.29	Aura Morales (GUA)	Isabel Tum (GUA)
Marathon	Maritza Martínez (CRC)	3:09:11	Gina Coello (HON)	Evelyn Diaz (ESA)
100 metres hurdles	Ivette Sánchez (PAN)	15.70	Elfride Krings (GUA)	Elisa Vega (ESA)
400 metres hurdles	Arely Franco (ESA)	65.12	Ivette Sánchez (PAN)	Patricia Valenzuela (GUA)
4 x 100 metres relay	El Salvador^{**} Leticia Osorto; Rosa Évora; Arely Franco; Lilian Monroy	48.91	Guatemala; Bermúdez; Amrei Baumgarten; Sandra Oliveros; Ibarra	Honduras; Pastora Chávez; Duarte; Gutiérrez; Mejía
4 x 400 metres relay	El Salvador^{**} Rosa Évora; Aída Franco; Arely Franco; Umaña	3:59.67	Nicaragua; Martha Portobanco; Deborah Rugama; Ana Traña; Aragón	Guatemala; Patricia Valenzuela; Elsa Monterroso; Sandra Oliveros; Cruz
10,000 metres Track Walk	María Ambrosio (GUA)	52:29.22	Magdalena Guzmán (ESA)	Ivis Martínez (ESA)
High jump	Ivonne Montoya (CRC)	1.58	Aída Franco (ESA)	Elisa Vega (ESA)
Long jump	Althea Moses (BIZ)^{†}	5.22	Pastora Chávez (HON)	Elluany Reid (CRC)
Triple jump	Althea Moses (BIZ)^{†}	12.21	Pastora Chávez (HON)	Arely Franco (ESA)
Shot put	Glendorle Pinnock (CRC)	12.64	Verónica Monzón (GUA)	Eva María Dimas (ESA)
Discus throw	Eva María Dimas (ESA)	42.20	María Lourdes Ruiz (NCA)	Jessica García (HON)
Hammer throw	Eva María Dimas (ESA)	40.52	Jessica García (HON)	Iris Rosales (GUA)
Javelin throw	Raisa Domínguez (PAN)	41.34^{*}	Ana Hernández (CRC)	Glendorle Pinnock (CRC)
Heptathlon	Ivonne Montoya (CRC)^{‡}	3903	Ruth Gallardo (ESA)	Sandra Olverios (GUA)

== Notes ==
^{†}: One source lists María Fleischmann from Guatemala as gold medal winner in both long jump and triple jump.

^{‡}: One source lists Magdalena Molina from Costa Rica as gold medal winner in Heptathlon.

^{*}: Original model javelin.

^{**}: One source lists the relay teams of Costa Rica as gold medal winners for both 4 × 100 m relay and 4 × 400 m relay.

== Medal table (unofficial) ==
* Host nation (El Salvador)

Rank	Nation	Gold	Silver	Bronze	Total
1	Costa Rica	17	9	8	34
2	Guatemala	9	14	13	36
3	El Salvador*	8	7	15	30
4	Honduras	3	8	4	15
5	Nicaragua	3	3	2	8
6	Panama	3	3	1	7
7	Belize	2	1	2	5
Totals (7 entries)		45	45	45	135
