= 1998 Central American Championships in Athletics =

XIII Central American Championships in Athletics
- Dates: 26–28 November 1998
- Host city: Guatemala City, Guatemala
- Venue: Estadio Mateo Flores
- Level: Senior
- Events: 42
- Participation: 4 nations

The 13th Central American Championships in Athletics were held at the Estadio Mateo Flores in Guatemala City, Guatemala, between 26 and 28 November 1998.

A total of 42 events were contested, 21 by men, 21 by women.

== Medal summary ==
=== Men ===
Event	Gold		Silver		Bronze	
100 metres	José Tinoco; Guatemala	10.7	Edgardo Serpas; El Salvador	10.7	Rolando Blanco; Guatemala	11.0
200 metres	Edgardo Serpas; El Salvador	21.9	Alejandro Navarro; El Salvador	22.1	Denis Gutiérrez; Nicaragua	22.1
400 metres	Alejandro Navarro; El Salvador	48.4	Arisk Perdomo; Guatemala	48.8	Carlos Toledo; El Salvador	50.8
800 metres	Alfredo Hernández; Guatemala	1:56.8	César Arias; El Salvador	1:57.7	Ronald Arias; El Salvador	2:02.2
1500 metres	Evilio Santos; Guatemala	4:07.2	Alfredo Hernández; Guatemala	4:08.8	Ronald Arias; El Salvador	4:15.2
5000 metres	José Antonio Morales; Guatemala	15:03.2	José Amado García; Guatemala	15:47.6	Jorge Hernández; El Salvador	16:27.7
10,000 metres	José Antonio Morales; Guatemala	32:11.9	José Amado García; Guatemala	33:22.2	Carlos Ochoa; El Salvador	34:19.9
110 metres hurdles	Alex Foster; Costa Rica	14.6	Jefry Pacheco; Guatemala	15.4	Álvaro Paiz; Guatemala	15.5
400 metres hurdles	Alejandro Navarro; El Salvador	52.2	Alex Foster; Costa Rica	52.9	Arisk Perdomo; Guatemala	54.4
3000 metres steeplechase	Jorge Hernández; El Salvador	10:05.4	René Merino; El Salvador	10:26.2	Alfredo Hernández; Guatemala	10:56.9
4 × 400 metres relay	El Salvador	3:23.6	Guatemala	3:24.7		
20,000 metres track walk	Luis Fernando García; Guatemala	1:32:57	Julio René Martínez; Guatemala	1:33:54	Roberto Oscal; Guatemala	1:36:34
High jump	Francisco Flores; Guatemala	1.84	Rodolfo Espinoza; Guatemala	1.70	Rogelio Campos; El Salvador; Luis Aguirre; El Salvador	1.70
Pole vault	Róger Borbón; Costa Rica	4.70	Sixto Ancheta; El Salvador	4.00	Jorge Solórzano; Guatemala	3.80
Long jump	Julio Gutiérrez; El Salvador	6.37	Álvaro Paiz; Guatemala	6.14	José Tinoco; Guatemala	6.03
Triple jump	Rolando Lewis; Costa Rica	13.95	José Tinoco; Guatemala	13.19	Rogelio Campos; El Salvador	13.00
Shot put	Edson Monzón; Guatemala	13.56	Erick Rivas; El Salvador	13.26	Henry Santos; Guatemala	13.11
Discus throw	Fernando Alonzo; Guatemala	39.16	Raúl Rivera; Guatemala	38.10	Walter Hernández; El Salvador	37.78
Hammer throw	Guillermo Morales; El Salvador	55.58	Raúl Rivera; Guatemala	51.46	Vicente Franco; El Salvador	46.24
Javelin throw	Fernando Paloma; El Salvador	61.66	Max Letona; Guatemala	50.40	Orlando Ruano; Guatemala	47.14
Decathlon	Mauricio Carranza; El Salvador	5034	Pavel Ramírez; Guatemala	4627		

=== Women ===
Event	Gold		Silver		Bronze	
100 metres	Leticia Sorto; El Salvador	12.6	Beatriz Amaya; El Salvador	12.6	María José Paiz; Guatemala	13.2
200 metres	Arely Franco; El Salvador	25.8	Leticia Sorto; El Salvador	26.2	Priscilla Curling; Costa Rica	27.0
400 metres	Arely Franco; El Salvador	57.2	Ana Quezada; El Salvador	59.9	Rosana Rodríguez; Guatemala	60.0
800 metres	Ana Quezada; El Salvador	2:19.2	Sandra Siguenza; El Salvador	2:26.2	Elisa Ramos; Guatemala	2:38.7
1500 metres	Marcela Jackson; Costa Rica	4:49.7	Ivis Martínez; El Salvador	5:13.7	Sandra Siguenza; El Salvador	5:16.0
5000 metres	Marcela Jackson; Costa Rica	18:22.6	María Klody Hidalgo; El Salvador	18:30.8	Elsa Monterosso; Guatemala	18:45.3
10,000 metres	Kriscia García; El Salvador	38:06.7	María Klody Hidalgo; El Salvador	38:21.5	Angelina Cornejo; Guatemala	40:09.2
100 metres hurdles	Denis Jerez; Guatemala	15.8	Aura Amaya; El Salvador	15.9	Sandra Oliveros; Guatemala	15.9
400 metres hurdles	Patricia Valenzuela; Guatemala	67.7	Arely Franco; El Salvador	69.7	Karla Fernández; El Salvador	72.2
4 × 100 metres relay	El Salvador	49.9	Guatemala	54.0		
4 × 400 metres relay	El Salvador	4:07.5				
10,000 metres track walk	Teresita Collado; Guatemala	49:39.4	Ivis Martínez; El Salvador	50:56.6	Zoila Reyes; Guatemala	55:04.8
High jump	Silvia Cob; Costa Rica	1.60	Sandra Oliveros; Guatemala	1.50	María Carrillo; El Salvador	1.50
Pole vault	Denise Jerez; Guatemala	2.95	Karla Herńndez; El Salvador	2.60	L. Castro; El Salvador	2.20
Long jump	María Carrillo; El Salvador	5.17	Priscilla Curling; Costa Rica	5.06	Ruth Gallardo; El Salvador	4.68
Triple jump	María Carrillo; El Salvador	10.57	María José Paiz; Guatemala	10.55	Ruth Gallardo; El Salvador	10.26
Shot put	Veronica Monzón; Guatemala	11.90	Eva María Dimas; El Salvador	11.85	Sandra Valiente; El Salvador	10.87
Discus throw	Eva María Dimas; El Salvador	42.90	Ana Lucía Espinoza; Guatemala	41.72	Rosita Vadillo; El Salvador	33.48
Hammer throw	Sandra Valiente; El Salvador	44.90	Ana Lucía Espinoza; Guatemala	40.10	Rosita de León; Guatemala	37.24
Javelin throw	Raquel Hernández; Costa Rica	36.16	Aida Figueroa; Guatemala	34.80	Arely Coreas; El Salvador	34.14
Heptathlon	Sandra Oliveros; Guatemala	3946	Paula Zayas; El Salvador	3356	Evelyn Núñez; Guatemala	2573

== Medal table (unofficial) ==
* Host nation (Guatemala)

Rank	Nation	Gold	Silver	Bronze	Total
1	El Salvador	20	19	19	58
2	Guatemala*	15	20	18	53
3	Costa Rica	7	2	1	10
4	Nicaragua	0	0	1	1
Totals (4 entries)		42	41	39	122
