= 1984 Central American Championships in Athletics =

X Central American Championships in Athletics
- Dates: 15–18 August 1984
- Host city: Guatemala City, Guatemala
- Venue: Estadio Mateo Flores
- Level: Senior
- Events: 40
- Participation: 5 nations

The 10th Central American Championships in Athletics were held in Guatemala City, Guatemala, between 15 and 18 June 1984.

A total of 40 events were contested, 24 by men, 16 by women.

== Medal summary ==
=== Men ===
Event	Gold		Silver		Bronze	
100 metres	Vladimir Samayoa; Guatemala	10.4	Glenn Abrahams; Costa Rica	10.5	Roberto Guillén; Nicaragua	10.6
200 metres	Vladimir Samayoa; Guatemala	21.5	Byron Chamorro; Nicaragua	22.1	Mario Morgan; Costa Rica	22.3
400 metres	Mario Brown; Costa Rica	48.8	Arturo Leiva; Guatemala	49.8	Carlos Alas; El Salvador	50.1
800 metres	Luis Mena; Costa Rica	1:53.6 NR	Alberto López; Guatemala	1:54.5	Luis Munguía; Nicaragua	1:55.3
1500 metres	Luis Mena; Costa Rica	3:56.8	Hugo Allan García; Guatemala	3:57.1	Alberto Paredes; Guatemala	4:02.0
5000 metres	Orlando Mora; Costa Rica	15:10.5	Miguel Vargas; Costa Rica	15:12.6	Eliezer López; Costa Rica	15:13.0
10,000 metres	Miguel Vargas; Costa Rica	31:45.2	Eliezer López; Costa Rica	31:45.4	Orlando Mora; Costa Rica	31:45.5
Marathon	Jorge Delgado; Costa Rica	2:26:11	Manuel Rodríguez; Guatemala	2:26:31	Carlos Alvarado; Guatemala	2:35:07
110 metres hurdles	Ángel Díaz; Guatemala	15.6	Arnaldo Monge; Costa Rica	16.0	Alex Kacher; Guatemala	16.1
400 metres hurdles	Luis Mungía; Nicaragua	55.7	José Miguel Vega; Costa Rica	57.1	Francisco Recinos; Guatemala	57.4
3000 metres steeplechase	Hugo Allan García; Guatemala	9:28.4	Eliezer López; Costa Rica	9:39.7	Freddy Arango; Guatemala	9:41.7
4 × 100 metres relay	Costa Rica; Michael Pearson; Mario Brown; Mario Ramírez; Glenn Abrahams	42.5	Nicaragua; Rolando Martínez; Harold Pérez; Byron Chamorro; Gary Lisby	42.6	Guatemala; Emilio Moss; Guillermo Parra; Manuel Chinchilla; Vladimir Samayoa	42.8
4 × 400 metres relay	Costa Rica; Mario Brown; Carlos Cunningham; José Miguel Vega; Michael Pearson	3:19.1 NR	Guatemala; Sergio Aguilar; Francisco Recinos; Arturo Leiva; Emilio Moss	3:20.7	El Salvador; René Sermeño; Rubén Quintanilla; Carlos Alas; René López	3:23.7
20 kilometres walk	Santiago Fonseca; Honduras	1:34:01 NR	Víctor Alonso; Guatemala	1:38:33	Sergio Guttiérrez; Costa Rica	1:40:25
50 kilometres walk	Santiago Fonseca; Honduras	4:31:55 NR	Arturo Roldán; Guatemala	4:40:24	Sergio Guttiérrez; Costa Rica	4:50:24
High jump	Ángel Díaz; Guatemala	1.90	Ricardo Campbell; Costa Rica	1.85	Estuardo López; Guatemala	1.85
Pole vault	Antonio Montepeque; Guatemala	3.60	Héctor Salvatierra; Guatemala	3.50	Carlos Fernández; Guatemala	3.40
Long jump	José Allen Rowe; Guatemala	6.38	Nélson de León; El Salvador	6.34	Espartaco Gaytán; Guatemala	6.30
Triple jump	Espartaco Gaytán; Guatemala	14.32	José Allen Rowe; Guatemala	13.84	Ángel Díaz; Guatemala	13.48
Shot put	Juan Turcios; Nicaragua	13.54	César Sajche; Guatemala	13.46	Juan Galdámez; El Salvador	13.33
Discus throw	Fernando Alonzo; Guatemala	40.98	Iván Turcios; Nicaragua	40.36	Ernesto Meléndez; El Salvador	39.60
Hammer throw	Víctor Taracena; Guatemala	49.72 NR	Igor Morales; Guatemala	46.04	Fernando Montepeque; Guatemala	42.44
Javelin throw	Domingo Reyes; Nicaragua	64.20	José Peralta; Nicaragua	61.30	Rudy Aguilar; El Salvador	60.50
Decathlon	Héctor Salvatierra; Guatemala	5200	Rudy Aguilar; El Salvador	4653	Fernando Chacón; Costa Rica	4471

=== Women ===
Event	Gold		Silver		Bronze	
100 metres	Crista Schumann; Guatemala	11.7 NR	Patricia Quiñones; Guatemala	11.9	Arlette Channer; Costa Rica	12.2
200 metres	Crista Schumann; Guatemala	24.6 NR	Patricia Meighan; Guatemala	24.8	Zoila Stewart; Costa Rica	25.4
400 metres	Patricia Meighan; Guatemala	56.2 NR	Maureen Stewart; Costa Rica	56.4	Zoila Stewart; Costa Rica	61.1
800 metres	Maureen Stewart; Costa Rica	2:12.8 NR	Patricia Meighan; Guatemala	2:15.3	Kriscia García; El Salvador	2:20.0
1500 metres	Kriscia García; El Salvador	4:44.1 NR	Carmen Montiel; Costa Rica	4:47.5	Aura Morales; Guatemala	4:55.9
3000 metres	Kriscia García; El Salvador	10:26.9 NR	Carmen Montiel; Costa Rica	10:43.1	Aura Morales; Guatemala	10:45.5
100 metres hurdles	Amapola Arimany; Guatemala	15.7	Lucrecia Aragón; Guatemala	18.1	Magdalena Molina; Costa Rica	18.3
400 metres hurdles	Leticia Jiménez; Guatemala	68.9	Virginia Boesche; Guatemala	69.1	Vilma Calvio; El Salvador	70.0
4 × 100 metres relay	Guatemala; Patricia Meighan; Elsa Zuñiga; Patricia Quiñones; Crista Schumann	47.9	Costa Rica; Indra Hansen; Sigrid Guttiérez; Arlette Channer; Zoila Stewart	48.6	Nicaragua; Rosario Miranda; Claudia Miranda; Paula Cuadra; Ana María Valle	52.6
4 × 400 metres relay	Guatemala; Elsa Zuñiga; Leticia Jiménez; Crista Schumann; Patricia Meighan	3:58.3 NR	Costa Rica; Magdalena Molina; Indra Hansen; Zoila Stewart; Maureen Stewart	4:10.1	El Salvador; Arely Franco; Zoila de Quintanilla; Kriscia García; Daysi Calvillo	4:15.0
High jump	Ruth Gallardo; El Salvador	1.45	Severena Crawford; Costa Rica	1.45	Lucrecia Aragón; Guatemala	1.40
Long jump	Patricia Quiñones; Guatemala	5.14	Arlette Channer; Costa Rica	5.02	Larissa Soto; Guatemala	4.78
Shot put	Glendorlee Pinnock; Costa Rica	11.02	Ave María Alpizar; Costa Rica	10.70	Mercedes Centero; Guatemala	10.42
Discus throw	María Lourdes Ruiz; Nicaragua	35.36 NR	Juana Carbajal; Nicaragua	33.14	Glendorlee Pinnock; Costa Rica	32.68
Javelin throw	Ana María Valle; Nicaragua	45.80 NR	María Lourdes Ruiz; Nicaragua	36.46	Iris Rosales; Guatemala	32.90
Heptathlon	Amapola Arimany; Guatemala	3707 NR	Larissa Soto; Guatemala	4614 NU20R	María Chavarría; Costa Rica	3288

== Medal table ==
* Host nation (Guatemala)

Rank	Nation	Gold	Silver	Bronze	Total
1	Guatemala (GUA)*	20	17	17	54
2	Costa Rica (CRC)	10	15	12	37
3	Nicaragua (NIC)	5	6	3	14
4	El Salvador (ESA)	3	2	8	13
5	Honduras	2	0	0	2
Totals (5 entries)		40	40	40	120
