= 1991 Central American Championships in Athletics =

XI Central American Championships in Athletics
- Dates: 27–28 June 1991
- Host city: Tegucigalpa, Honduras
- Level: Senior
- Events: 39
- Participation: 6 nations

The 11th Central American Championships in Athletics were held in Tegucigalpa, Honduras, between 27 and 28 June 1991.

A total of 39 events were contested, 21 by men, 18 by women.

== Medal summary ==
=== Men ===
Event	Gold		Silver		Bronze	
100 metres	Florencio Aguilar; Panama	10.70	Manuel Chinchill; Guatemala	10.98	Edgardo Morales; Panama	11.00
200 metres	Florencio Aguilar; Panama	21.98	Manuel Chinchill; Guatemala	22.60	Edgardo Morales; Panama	22.73
400 metres	Erick Krings; Guatemala	49.92	Carlos Sequeira; Nicaragua	50.18	Adonay Rivera; Honduras	50.32
800 metres	Luis Martínez; Guatemala	1:51.52	Carlos Mairena; Nicaragua	1:53.27	César Martínez; Honduras	1:56.43
1500 metres	Luis Martínez; Guatemala	3:53.79	Roger Miranda; Nicaragua	4:01.03	Said Gómez; Panama	4:01.49
5000 metres	José Antonio Morales; Guatemala	14:48.06	Mario Farello; Guatemala	14:57.57	Roger Miranda; Nicaragua	15:27.48
10,000 metres	José Antonio Morales; Guatemala	30:20.00	Mario Farello; Guatemala	31:19.66	Agustín Morán; Panama	31:37.34
Marathon	Luis España; Guatemala	2:50:22	Ramón González; Honduras	2:56:03	Juan Raudales; Honduras	3:35:21
110 metres hurdles	Sidney Clark; Panama	14.86	Rudel Franco; El Salvador	15.27	Mauricio Carranza; El Salvador	15.37
400 metres hurdles	Erick Krings; Guatemala	53.48	Sidney Clark; Panama	54.34	Francisco Flores; Honduras	54.42
4 × 100 metres relay	Panama	42.30	El Salvador	43.89	Honduras	44.19
4 × 400 metres relay	Guatemala	3:19.83	Nicaragua	3:23.45	Honduras	3:25.64
High jump	Alfredo William; Nicaragua	1.94	Daniel Flores; Honduras	1.88	Eduardo García; Nicaragua	1.85
Pole vault	Roger Manzur; El Salvador	3.45	Jorge Flores; Honduras	3.00	Only two starters	
Long jump	Pedro Scott; Panama	6.55	Howard Pandy; Honduras	6.46	Tito Vides; Guatemala	6.21
Triple jump	Pedro Scott; Panama	14.57	Mauricio Carranza; El Salvador	14.10	Héctor Ruiz; Honduras	13.94
Shot put	Jaime Comandari; El Salvador	14.17	César Sajche; Guatemala	13.34	Fernando Palomo; El Salvador	11.64
Discus throw	Francisco Rosales; Nicaragua	38.64	Jaime Comandari; El Salvador	38.40	Benjamín Benítez; Honduras	37.62
Hammer throw	Enrique Reina; Honduras	40.18	Alfonso Argumedo; El Salvador	35.66	Guillermo Morales; El Salvador	32.36
Javelin throw	Rigoberto Calderón; Nicaragua	64.68	Walter Sosa; Guatemala	55.60	Luis Bermúdez; Costa Rica	54.66
Decathlon	Jorge Flores; Honduras	5663	Francisco Flores; Honduras	5341	Only two starters	

=== Women ===
Event	Gold		Silver		Bronze	
100 metres	Zoila Stewart; Costa Rica	12.01	Rita Alcazar; Panama	12.06	Petrona Arriola; Honduras	12.29
200 metres	Zoila Stewart; Costa Rica	24.90	Rita Alcazar; Panama	25.12	Petrona Arriola; Honduras	26.11
400 metres	Zoila Stewart; Costa Rica	55.29	Arely Franco; El Salvador	59.62	Patricia Traña; Nicaragua	62.10
800 metres	Elsa Monterroso; Guatemala	2:22.32	Rosalba Rodríguez; Panama	2:23.20	Olga Zepeda; Honduras	2:23.43
1500 metres	Elsa Monterroso; Guatemala	4:55.73	Olga Zepeda; Honduras	4:57.03	Rosalba Rodríguez; Panama	5:05.57
3000 metres	Aura Morales; Guatemala	10:13.59	Marta Montes; El Salvador	10:49.78	Gina Coello; Honduras	10:59.22
100 metres hurdles	Estela Kelly; Panama	14.75	Ana Regina Quiñónez; Guatemala	15.16	Waleska Montoya; Honduras	19.43
400 metres hurdles	Larissa Soto; Guatemala	60.63	Estela Kelly; Panama	63.70	Patricia Valenzuela; Guatemala	70.26
4 × 100 metres relay	Guatemala	50.93	El Salvador	52.20	Honduras	53.19
4 × 400 metres relay	Panama	4:14.01	El Salvador	4:17.38	Guatemala	4:18.66
10,000 metres track walk	Magdalena Guzmán; El Salvador	54:23.09	Doris Vallecillo; Honduras	55:11.03	Olga Martínez; Guatemala	58:51.40
High jump	Ana Regina Quiñónez; Guatemala	1.75	Johanna Green; Nicaragua	1.59	Ruth Gallardo; El Salvador	1.53
Long jump	Larissa Soto; Guatemala	4.80	Damaris Zamora; Honduras	4.50	Pastora Martínez; Honduras	4.49
Triple jump	Ruth Gallardo; El Salvador	10.22	Claudia Álvarez; Nicaragua	10.07	Arely Franco; El Salvador	10.06
Shot put	Verónica Monzón; Guatemala	11.31	Miriam Galindo; Guatemala	10.32	Fidelina Ponce; Honduras	8.07
Discus throw	María Lourdes Ruiz; Nicaragua	42.30	Verónica Monzón; Guatemala	30.24	Miriam Galindo; Guatemala	27.22
Javelin throw	Miriam Galindo; Guatemala	36.88	Damaris Enrique; Nicaragua	34.88	María Lourdes Ruiz; Nicaragua	33.72
Heptathlon	Larissa Soto; Guatemala	4334	Ruth Gallardo; El Salvador	3537	Sandra Oliveros; Guatemala	2904

== Medal table ==
* Host nation (Guatemala)

Rank	Nation	Gold	Silver	Bronze	Total
1	Guatemala (GUA)	18	9	6	33
2	Panama (PAN)	8	5	5	18
3	El Salvador (ESA)	4	10	5	19
4	Nicaragua (NIC)	4	7	4	15
5	Costa Rica (CRC)	3	0	1	4
6	Honduras*	2	8	16	26
Totals (6 entries)		39	39	37	115
