= Mauricio Carranza =

Salvadoran athlete (born 1965)

Personal information
- Full name: Mauricio Carranza Rivas
- Born: 2 February 1965 (age 61)

Sport
- Sport: Athletics
- Events: 110 m hurdles, 400 m hurdles, triple jump
Medal record
Representing El Salvador
Central American Games
Bronze medal – third place	1990 Tegucigalpa	110m hurdles
Bronze medal – third place	1990 Tegucigalpa	400m hurdles
Bronze medal – third place	1990 Tegucigalpa	Triple jump
Bronze medal – third place	1994 San Salvador	4x100m relay

Mauricio Carranza Rivas (born 2 February 1965) is a retired Salvadoran athlete who competed primarily in the hurdling and horizontal jumping events. He represented his country at three indoor and one outdoor World Championships.

== International competitions ==
Year	Competition	Venue	Position	Event	Notes
Representing El Salvador
1984	Central American Championships	Guatemala City, Guatemala	4th	Long jump	6.20 m
1984	Central American Championships	Guatemala City, Guatemala	4th	Triple jump	13.40 m
1985	Universiade	Kobe, Japan	21st (h)	110 m hurdles	16.75 s
1985	Universiade	Kobe, Japan	25th (q)	Long jump	6.89 m
1987	World Indoor Championships	Toronto, Canada	17th (h)	60 m hurdles	9.01 s
1987	World Indoor Championships	Toronto, Canada	19th (q)	Triple jump	13.74 m
1987	Pan American Games	Indianapolis, United States	5th	110 m hurdles	15.72 s
1987	Pan American Games	Indianapolis, United States	14th (h)	400 m hurdles	55.38 s
1987	Pan American Games	Indianapolis, United States	14th (q)	Long jump	6.37 m
1987	World Championships	Rome, Italy	35th (h)	110 m hurdles	15.67 s
1990	Central American Games	Tegucigalpa, Honduras	3rd	110 m hurdles	
1990	Central American Games	Tegucigalpa, Honduras	3rd	400 m hurdles	
1990	Central American Games	Tegucigalpa, Honduras	3rd	Triple jump	
1991	Central American Championships	Tegucigalpa, Honduras	3rd	110 m hurdles	15.37 s
1991	Central American Championships	Tegucigalpa, Honduras	4th	400 m hurdles	54.42 s
1991	Central American Championships	Tegucigalpa, Honduras	2nd	Triple jump	14.10 m
1991	Pan American Games	Havana, Cuba	10th (h)	110 m hurdles	15.69 s
1991	Pan American Games	Havana, Cuba	9th	Triple jump	13.79 m
1992	Ibero-American Championships	Seville, Spain	15th (h)	400 m hurdles	54.18 s
1993	World Indoor Championships	Toronto, Canada	28th (h)	60 m hurdles	8.68 s
1993	Universiade	Buffalo, United States	24th (h)	110 m hurdles	15.68 s
1993	Universiade	Buffalo, United States	25th (h)	400 m hurdles	54.18 s
1993	Universiade	Buffalo, United States	30th (q)	Long jump	6.64 m
1994	Central American Games	San Salvador, El Salvador	3rd	4 × 400 m relay	
1997	Central American Games	San Pedro Sula, Honduras	6th	Decathlon	5050 pts
1998	Central American Championships	Guatemala City, Guatemala	4th	110 m hurdles	17.3 s
1998	Central American Championships	Guatemala City, Guatemala	1st	Decathlon	5034 pts
2005	Central American Championships	San José, Costa Rica	3rd	Decathlon	4554 pts

== Personal bests ==
Outdoor

- 110 metres hurdles – 15.67 s (+1.4, Rome 1987)
- 400 metres hurdles – 54.18 s (Seville 1992)
- Long jump – 6.89 m (Kobe 1985)
- Triple jump – 14.10 m (Tegucigalpa 1991)

Indoor

- 60 metres hurdles – 8.68 s (Toronto 1993)
- Triple jump – 13.74 m (Indianapolis 1987)
