= 2003 Central American Championships in Athletics =

XV Central American Championships in Athletics
- Dates: June 20-21
- Host city: Guatemala City, Guatemala
- Venue: Estadio Cementos Progreso
- Level: Senior
- Events: 41 (21 men, 20 women)
- Participation: 7 nations

The 15th Central American Championships in Athletics were held at the Estadio Cementos Progreso in Guatemala City, Guatemala, between June 20-21, 2003.

A total of 41 events were contested, 21 by men and 20 by women.

== Medal summary ==
Complete results and medal winners were published.

=== Men ===
Event	Gold		Silver		Bronze	
100 metres (wind: +0.8 m/s)	Mario Rolando Blanco (GUA)	10.47	Jorge Luis Solórzano (GUA)	10.69	Ronny Arroyo (CRC)	10.92
200 metres	Andrés Leonel Rodríguez (PAN)	21.77	Jorge Conde (NCA)	22.05	Ronny Arroyo (CRC)	22.09
400 metres	Andrés Leonel Rodríguez (PAN)	47.98	René Marcelo Figueroa (ESA)	48.43	Selvin Henry (GUA)	48.71
800 metres	Roberto Arroyo (CRC)	1:54.94	Danilo Hernández (NCA)	1:55.95	Ruperto Daley (PAN)	1:56.58
1500 metres	Francisco Saenz (GUA)	4:01.14	Danilo Hernández (NCA)	4:08.32	José Francisco Chávez (CRC)	4:10.03
5000 metres	José Amado García (GUA)	15:19.35	César Lizano (CRC)	16:02.25	Carlos Loza (NCA)	16:28.02
10,000 metres	José Amado García (GUA)	30:16.25	Sergio Castellanos (HON)	34:15.54	Carlos Loza (NCA)	35:10.37
110 metres hurdles (wind: -1.7 m/s)	Roberto Cortés (ESA)	15.35	Anthony Rugama (CRC)	15.57	Edgar Esquina (PAN)	15.88
400 metres hurdles	Roberto Cortés (ESA)	53.09	Selvin Henry (GUA)	55.64	Camilo Quevedo (GUA)	55.71
3000 metres steeplechase	César Lizano (CRC)	10:04.87	Marlon Monterrosa (ESA)	10:29.20	Federico Vargas (CRC)	10:34.82
4 x 100 metres relay	Guatemala; Mario Rolando Blanco; Jorge Luis Solórzano; Juan Pablo Macal; Luis Reyes	41.71	Costa Rica; Ronny Arroyo; Antonio Ramírez; Emmanuel Chanto; Oscar Barzuna	41.83	Panama; Andrés Leonel Rodríguez; Félix Montaner; Ruperto Daley; Edgar Esquina	43.86
4 x 400 metres relay	Costa Rica; David Umaña; Roberto Arroyo; Emmanuel Chanto; Víctor Cantillano	3:19.03	El Salvador; Francis Jiménez; Juan Francisco Caneses; Takeshi Fujiwara; Roberto Cortés	3:19.16	Panama; Andrés Leonel Rodríguez; Félix Montaner; Ruperto Daley; Edgar Esquina	3:19.36
20 Kilometres Walk	Allan Segura (CRC)	1:32:44.90	Denis Roaldo Estrada (GUA)	1:33:40.24	Carlos Humberto Ortiz (GUA)	1:35:00.00
High jump	Henry Linton (CRC)	2.02	Octavius Gillespie (GUA)	1.99	Alejandro Olmedo (ESA)	1.90
Pole vault	Jorge Solórzano (GUA)	4.50	Pedro Alfonso Fuentes (ESA)	4.45	Miguel Campollo (GUA)	4.10
Long jump	Jonathan Romero (PAN)	6.87 (wind: +0.1 m/s)	Ulises Peña (NCA)	6.86 (wind: +0.8 m/s)	Álvaro Paiz (GUA)	6.66 (wind: -0.1 m/s)
Triple jump	Álvaro Paiz (GUA)	14.79 (wind: +1.6 m/s)	Ulises Peña (NCA)	14.47 (wind: 0.0 m/s)	Juan Carlos Nájera (GUA)	14.44 (wind: +0.1 m/s)
Shot put	Edson Monzón (GUA)	15.25	Henry Santos (GUA)	14.24	Lenín Gutiérrez (NCA)	12.29
Discus throw	Nelson Chavarría (CRC)	44.25	Raúl Rivera (GUA)	43.54	Raúl Squirre (PAN)	41.04
Hammer throw	Raúl Rivera (GUA)	62.14 CR	Diego Berríos (GUA)	51.25	Nelson Chavarría (CRC)	46.46
Javelin throw	Rigoberto Calderón (NCA)	68.14	Octavius Gillespie (GUA)	65.87	Javier Ugarte (NCA)	62.37

=== Women ===
Event	Gold		Silver		Bronze	
100 metres (wind: -0.1 m/s)	Mónica Campos (CRC)	12.48 CR	María José Paiz (GUA)	12.54	Rita Lisbeth Alcázar (PAN)	12.64
200 metres (wind: +2.7 m/s)	Melissa Moraga (CRC)	25.63 w	Rita Lisbeth Alcázar (PAN)	25.90 w	Irma Navarrete (NCA)	26.40 w
400 metres	Karla Hernández (ESA)	57.66	Rosana Rodríguez (GUA)	57.69	Amada Martínez (ESA)	57.99
800 metres	Rosa Évora (ESA)	2:14.90	Karen Arce (CRC)	2:15.46	Rosana Rodríguez (GUA)	2:17.13
1500 metres	Elsa Monterroso (GUA)	4:40.58	Gabriela Traña (CRC)	4:41.27	Dina Judith Cruz (GUA)	4:45.62
5000 metres	Elsa Monterroso (GUA)	17:38.32 CR	Dina Judith Cruz (GUA)	18:06.66	Guadalupe Zúñiga (CRC)	19:09.13
10,000 metres	Elsa Monterroso (GUA)	37:28.80	Guadalupe Zúñiga (CRC)	39:10.31		
100 metres hurdles	María Gabriela Carrillo (ESA)	15.74	Migdalia Morgan (PAN)	16.18	Mitchelle Zúñiga (GUA)	16.24
400 metres hurdles	Cindy Castro (CRC)	64.65	Luz Patricia Valenzuela (GUA)	65.32	Migdalia Morgan (PAN)	71.72
4 x 100 metres relay	El Salvador; Amada Martínez; Karla Hernández; Ruth Daniela González; Rosa Lilian Évora	49.03	Costa Rica; Mónica Campos; Indra Hansen; Melissa Moraga; Farina Murillo	49.71	Guatemala; Brenda Blanco; Francisca Martínez; María José Paiz; Ana Cecilia Castillo	49.82
4 x 400 metres relay	Costa Rica; Raquel Barquero; Melissa Moraga; Ana Marcela González; Cindy Castro	3:54.47 CR	El Salvador; Susana Rodríguez; Karla Hernández; Ruth Daniela González; Rosa Lilian Évora	3:54.83	Guatemala; Luz Patricia Valenzuela; Rosana Rodríguez; Sandra Oliveros; Mitchelle Zúñiga	4:02.67
10,000 metres Walk	Teresita Natividad Collado (GUA)	49:29.38 CR	Evelyn Núñez (GUA)	50:21.52	María Amalia Reynolds (CRC)	1:03:39.65
High jump	María Gabriela Carrillo (ESA)	1.63	Alejandra Gómez (CRC)	1.60	Gabriela Barquero (CRC)	1.50
Pole vault	Peggy Ovalle (GUA)	2.70	Jaqueline Vargas (CRC)	2.20		
Long jump	Sabrina Asturias (GUA)	5.55 (wind: -0.2 m/s)	María Gabriela Carrillo (ESA)	5.40 (wind: -0.1 m/s)	Alejandra Gómez (CRC)	5.30 (wind: +0.3 m/s)
Triple jump	María José Paiz (GUA)	12.92	Peggy Ovalle (GUA)	11.40		
Shot put	Silvia Piñar (CRC)	10.90	María Lourdes Ruiz (NCA)	10.85	Doroty López (GUA)	10.78
Discus throw	Ana Lucía Espinoza (GUA)	40.12	Aixa Middleton (PAN)	36.77	María Lourdes Ruiz (NCA)	35.93
Hammer throw	Ana Lucía Espinoza (GUA)	47.08 CR	Silvia Piñar (CRC)	33.89	Viviana Abarca (CRC)	33.59
Javelin throw	Dalila Rugama (NCA)	49.40	Ángela Téllez (NCA)	43.23	Aida Lorena Figueroa (GUA)	37.76

== Medal table (unofficial) ==
* Host nation (Guatemala)

Rank	Nation	Gold	Silver	Bronze	Total
1	Guatemala (GUA)*	18	14	13	45
2	Costa Rica (CRC)	11	10	10	31
3	El Salvador (ESA)	7	6	2	15
4	Panama (PAN)	3	3	7	13
5	Nicaragua (NIC)	2	7	6	15
6	Honduras (HON)	0	1	0	1
Totals (6 entries)		41	41	38	120

== Team Ranking ==
Guatemala won the overall team ranking.

=== Total ===
The host country is highlighted in lavender blue

Rank	Nation	Points
1st place, gold medalist(s)	Guatemala	406
2nd place, silver medalist(s)	Costa Rica	313
3rd place, bronze medalist(s)	El Salvador	169
4	Nicaragua	166
5	(Panama) Panamá	103
6	Honduras	29
7	Belize	4
