= Athletics at the 1986 Central American Games =

Athletics at the III Central American Games
- Dates: January
- Host city: Guatemala City, Guatemala
- Venue: Estadio Nacional Mateo Flores
- Level: Senior
- Events: 40 (24 men, 16 women)

Athletics competitions at the 1986 Central American Games were held at the Estadio Nacional Mateo Flores in Guatemala City, Guatemala, in January 1986.

A total of 40 events were contested, 24 by men and 16 by women.

== Medal summary ==
Gold medal winners and their results were published. A complete list of medal winners can be found on the MásGoles webpage (click on "JUEGOS CENTROAMERICANOS" in the low right corner). Gold medalists were also published in other sources.

All results are marked as "affected by altitude" (A), because Guatemala City is located at 1,592 m above sea level.

=== Men ===
Event	Gold		Silver	Bronze
100 metres	Eugenio Melwall (NCA)	10.84 A	Roberto Guillén (NCA)	Kevin Garner (CRC)
200 metres	Harold Pérez (NCA)	21.84 A	Emilio Eva (GUA)	Michael Paerson (CRC)
400 metres	Francisco Recinos (GUA)	48.44 A	René López (ESA)	Frank Almendárez (NCA)
800 metres	Roger Miranda (NCA)	1:54.9 A	Orlando Ruano (GUA)	Luis Munguía (NCA)
1500 metres	Hugo Allan García (GUA)	3:59.93 A	Luis Mena (CRC)	Jorge Delgado (CRC)
5000 metres	Jorge Delgado (CRC)	15:10.74 A	Hugo Allan García (GUA)	Orlando Mora (CRC)
10,000 metres	Orlando Mora (CRC)	31:52.4 A	Eliécer López (CRC)	Oscar Valero (GUA)
Marathon	Mario Álvarez (CRC)	2:41:10 A	Juan Raudales (HON)	José Guardián (NCA)
110 metres hurdles	Gilberto Paterking (CRC)	15.1 A	Ángel Díaz (GUA)	Guillermo Parra (GUA)
400 metres hurdles	Francisco Recinos (GUA)	54.89 A	Arnoldo Monge (CRC)	José Vega (CRC)
3000 metres steeplechase	Hugo Allan García (GUA)	9:13.1 A	Alberto Paredes (GUA)	Eliécer López (CRC)
4 × 100 metres relay	Nicaragua; Harold Pérez; Gary Lisby; Roberto Guillén; Humberto Newball	41.80 A	Costa Rica	Guatemala; Emilio Eva; Luis Walters; Guillermo Parra; Fernando Polanco
4 × 400 metres relay	Nicaragua; Gary Lisby; Traña; Luis Munguía; Frank Almendárez	3:20.98 A	Costa Rica	Guatemala; Emilio Eva; Orlando Ruano; Fernando Polanco; Francisco Recinos
20 Kilometres Road Walk	Víctor Alonso (GUA)	1:31:48 A	Santiago Fonseca (HON)	Sergio Gutiérrez (CRC)
50 Kilometres Road Walk	Santiago Fonseca (HON)	4:41:07 A	Tomás Alvarez (GUA)	
High jump	Fernando Rodríguez (CRC)	1.95 A	Renso Samuels (CRC)	Estuardo López (GUA)
Pole vault	Antonio Montepeque (GUA)	4.35 A	Héctor Salvatierra (GUA)	Lucas Miranda (ESA)
Long jump	Vance Parks (CRC)	7.32 A	Johny Sterling (CRC)	Nelson Navarro (NCA)
Triple jump	Vance Parks (CRC)	15.16 A	José Allen (GUA)	Vicente Parks (CRC)
Shot put	Fernando Alonzo (GUA)	14.60 A	Jaime Comandari (ESA)	Iván Turcios (NCA)
Discus throw	Fernando Alonzo (GUA)	45.74 A	Alexis Allen (CRC)	Iván Turcios (NCA)
Hammer throw	Víctor Taracena (GUA)	49.98 A	Igor Morales (GUA)	Carlos Ruiz (NCA)
Javelin throw	Domingo Reyes (NCA)	66.38 A*	Walter Sosa (GUA)	Francisco Gavarrete (NCA)
Decathlon	Ángel Díaz (GUA)	6272 A	Johny Lester (CRC)	Héctor Salvatierra (GUA)

=== Women ===
Event	Gold		Silver	Bronze
100 metres	Christa Schumann (GUA)	12.16 A	Marisol García (NCA)	Sigrid Gutiérrez (CRC)
200 metres	Christa Schumann (GUA)	24.59 A	Marisol García (NCA)	Sigrid Gutiérrez (CRC)
400 metres	Christa Schumann (GUA)	56.23 A	Zoila Stewart (CRC)	Leticia Jiménez (GUA)
800 metres	Cristina Girón (GUA)	2:14.22 A	Leticia Jiménez (GUA)	Xiomara Larios (NCA)
1500 metres	Cristina Girón (GUA)	4:48.36 A	Aura Morales (GUA)	Kriscia García (ESA)
3000 metres	Kriscia García (ESA)	10:30.2 A		
100 metres hurdles	Amapola Arimany (GUA)	16.06 A	Kriscia Murray (CRC)	Dulce Berríos (NCA)
400 metres hurdles	Leticia Jiménez (GUA)	62.75 A		
4 × 100 metres relay	Costa Rica; Zoila Stewart; Quiroz; Sigrid Gutiérrez; Kriscia Murray	49.12 A	Nicaragua	El Salvador
4 × 400 metres relay	Guatemala; Heidi Krings; Cristina Girón; Leticia Jiménez; Christa Schumann	3:55.35 A	Costa Rica	Nicaragua
High jump	Severna Crawford (CRC)	1.55 A	Ivonne White (CRC)	Ruth Gallardo (ESA)
Long jump	Claudia Álvarez (NCA)	5.36 A	Damaris Patterson (CRC)	Ivonne White (CRC)
Shot put	Damaris Ulloa (NCA)	12.48 A	Marta Centeno (GUA)	Patricia Comandari (ESA)
Discus throw	Patricia Comandari (ESA)	38.46 A	María Lourdes Ruiz (NCA)	Marta Centeno (GUA)
Javelin throw	Ana María Valle (NCA)	42.80 A*	Patricia Chamorro (NCA)	Marleisa Pizarro (CRC)
Heptathlon	Lucrécia Aragón (GUA)	4165 A	Virginia Boesche (GUA)	Ana María Valle (NCA)

== Medal table (unofficial) ==
* Host nation (Guatemala)

Rank	Nation	Gold	Silver	Bronze	Total
1	Guatemala (GUA)*	19	14	8	41
2	Costa Rica (CRC)	9	14	12	35
3	Nicaragua (NIC)	9	6	12	27
4	El Salvador (ESA)	2	2	5	9
5	Honduras (HON)	1	2	0	3
Totals (5 entries)		40	38	37	115
