= Jorge Maradiaga =

Honduran decathlete

Personal information
- Nationality: Honduran
- Born: 2 February 1972 (age 54)

Sport
- Sport: Athletics
- Event: Decathlon
Medal record
Men's athletics
Representing Honduras
Central American Championships
Gold medal – first place	1991 Tegucigalpa	Decathlon
Silver medal – second place	1991 Tegucigalpa	Pole vault
Central American Games
Gold medal – first place	1994 San Salvador	Decathlon
Silver medal – second place	1994 San Salvador	Pole vault
Bronze medal – third place	1997 San Pedro Sula	Pole vault

Jorge Alberto Flores Maradiaga (born 2 February 1972), also known as Jorge Flores, is a Honduran decathlete and pole vaulter. He won gold medals at the Central American Championships and Central American Games, and competed in the men's decathlon at the 1992 Summer Olympics. He was called in Spanish one of the renowned athletes of Honduras.

== Career ==
At the 1991 Central American Championships in Athletics, Flores won the decathlon with 5663 points. He also won a silver medal in the individual pole vault.

Flores was selected to represent Honduras at the 1992 Summer Olympics in the decathlon as their sole competitor. On the first day of competition, he completed the 100 m in 11.75, long jump in 6.18 m, shot put in 9.54 m, high jump in 1.70 m, and 400 m in 54.81 seconds. On the final day, he finished the 110 m hurdles in 16.20 s, discus throw with 30.26 m, pole vault with 4.00 m, javelin throw in 42.46 m, and 1500 m in 5:04.10 minutes. His final score of 5746 points placed him 28th.

Flores set his decathlon then-personal best of 5856 points in 1994. He also performed a 5873-point decathlon at the 1994 Central American Games to win the gold medal, alongside another silver medal in the pole vault.

Flores competed in the pole vault at the 1997 Central American Games held in San Pedro Sula, Honduras. He won the bronze medal, jumping 4.00 metres.

== Personal life ==
Flores' brother is Francisco Flores, who competed at the 1993 World Athletics Championships and also won international medals in other competitions representing Honduras.

After his professional career, Flores became a masters athlete. He competed at the 2016 Honduran Masters Athletics Championships and qualified for that year's Central American Masters Athletics Championships in San Salvador, where he competed in the 110 m hurdles and 400 m hurdles along with his brother.
