= César Lizano =

Costa Rican long-distance runner

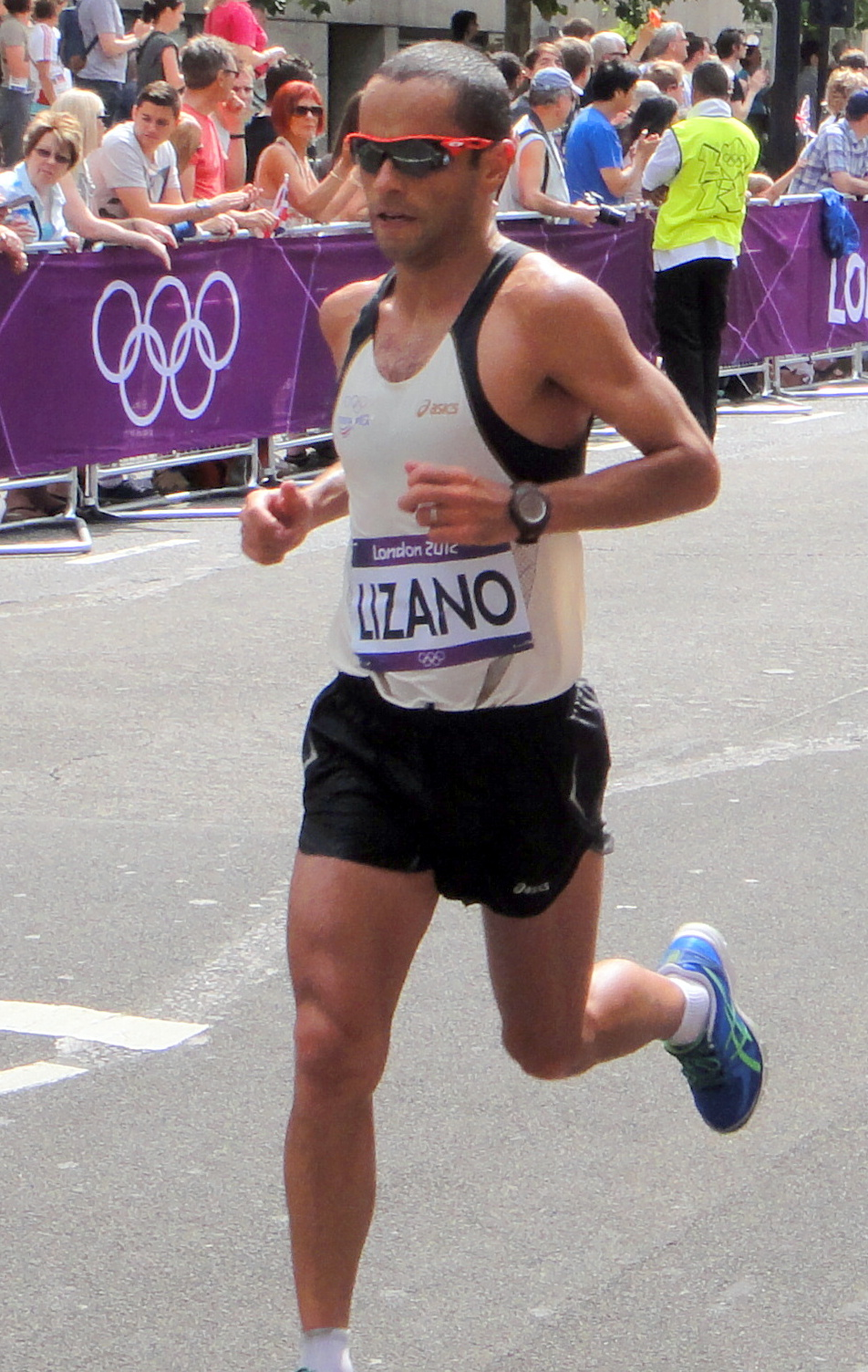
- Lizano in the marathon at the 2012 Olympics in London

Personal information
- Full name: César Andrés Lizano Cedeño
- Born: March 7, 1982 (age 44) San José, Costa Rica
- Height: 1.69 m (5 ft 7 in)
- Weight: 60 kg (130 lb)

Sport
- Country: Costa Rica
- Sport: Men's Athletics
- Event: Long-distance running
Medal record
Men's Athletics
Representing Costa Rica
Central American Championships
| Gold medal – first place | 2005 San José | 3000 m steeplechase |
| Gold medal – first place | 2003 Ciudad de Guatemala | 3000 m steeplechase |
| Silver medal – second place | 2012 Managua | 10,000 m |
| Silver medal – second place | 2004 Managua | 10,000 m |
| Bronze medal – third place | 2004 Managua | 5000 m |
| Bronze medal – third place | 2003 Ciudad de Guatemala | 5000 m |
| Bronze medal – third place | 2002 San José | 3000 m steeplechase |
- Updated on 13 July 2014

César Lizano is a Costa Rican long-distance runner. At the 2012 Summer Olympics, he competed in the Men's marathon, finishing in 65th place.

== Personal bests ==
- 3000 m steeplechase: 8:52.3 min – (Costa Rica) San José, 9 July 2001
- Half marathon: 1:05:51 hrs – (United States) Philadelphia, Pennsylvania, 15 September 2013
- Marathon: 2:17:50 hrs – (United States) Chicago, Illinois, 9 October 2011

== Achievements ==
| Year | Competition | Venue | Position | Event | Notes |
Representing Costa Rica
| 2002 | Central American Championships | San José, Costa Rica | 3rd | 3000 m steeplechase | 9.34.05 |
| 2003 | Central American Championships | Ciudad de Guatemala, Guatemala | 2nd | 5000 m | 16:02.25 |
| 2003 | Central American Championships | Ciudad de Guatemala, Guatemala | 1st | 3000 m steeplechase | 10:04.87 |
| 2004 | Central American Championships | Managua, Nicaragua | 3rd | 5000 m | 15:38.89 |
| 2004 | Central American Championships | Managua, Nicaragua | 2nd | 10,000 m | 32:21.10 |
| 2005 | Central American Championships | San José, Costa Rica | 1st | 3000 m steeplechase | 9:31.22 |
| 2009 | World Half Marathon Championships | Birmingham, United Kingdom | 84th | Half marathon | 1:09:08 |
| 2011 | Central American Championships | San José, Costa Rica | 3rd | 10,000 m | 31:59.07 |
| 2011 | Central American and Caribbean Championships | Mayagüez, Puerto Rico | 4th | Half marathon | 1:10:38 |
| 2012 | Central American Championships | Managua, Nicaragua | 2nd | 10,000 m | 31:38.1 |
| 2012 | Olympic Games | London, United Kingdom | 65th | Marathon | 2:24:16 |
| 2013 | Central American Games | San José, Costa Rica | 5th | 10,000 m | 32:03.57 |
| 2014 | World Half Marathon Championships | København, Denmark | 84th | Half marathon | 1:06:07 |
