= Zoila Stewart =

Costa Rican sprinter (born 1968)

Personal information
- Born: 1 November 1968 (age 57) San José, Costa Rica

Sport
- Sport: Track and field
Medal record
Representing Costa Rica
Central American and Caribbean Games
Silver medal – second place	1993 Ponce	400m
Central American Games
Gold medal – first place	1986 Guatemala City	400m
Gold medal – first place	1986 Guatemala City	4x100m relay
Gold medal – first place	1990 San Pedro Sula	100m
Gold medal – first place	1990 San Pedro Sula	200m
Gold medal – first place	1990 San Pedro Sula	400m
Gold medal – first place	1990 San Pedro Sula	4x100m relay
Gold medal – first place	1990 San Pedro Sula	4x400m relay
Gold medal – first place	1994 San Salvador	100m
Gold medal – first place	1994 San Salvador	400m
Gold medal – first place	1994 San Salvador	800m
Gold medal – first place	1997 San Pedro Sula	400m
Bronze medal – third place	1997 San Pedro Sula	100m
Bronze medal – third place	1997 San Pedro Sula	4x100m relay
Bronze medal – third place	1997 San Pedro Sula	4x400m relay

Zoila Rosa Stewart Lee (born 1 November 1968) is a retired Costa Rican sprinter who competed primarily in the 400 metres. She represented her country at two Olympic Games, in 1992 and 1996, as well as four World Championships. She won the silver medal at the 1993 Central American and Caribbean Games and multiple medals at Central American Games.

She still holds national records in several events including the outdoor 100 and 400 metres.

Her sister, Maureen Stewart, was an Olympic middle-distance runner.

== Competition record ==
Year	Competition	Venue	Position	Event	Notes
Representing Costa Rica
1984	Central American Championships	Guatemala City, Guatemala	4th	100 m	12.3
1984	Central American Championships	Guatemala City, Guatemala	3rd	200 m	25.4
1984	Central American Championships	Guatemala City, Guatemala	3rd	400 m	61.1
1984	Central American Championships	Guatemala City, Guatemala	2nd	4 × 100 m relay	48.6
1984	Central American Championships	Guatemala City, Guatemala	2nd	4 × 400 m relay	4:10.1
1986	Central American Games	Guatemala City, Guatemala	2nd	400 m	
1986	Central American Games	Guatemala City, Guatemala	1st	4 × 100 m relay	49.12
1987	Pan American Games	Indianapolis, United States	16th (sf)	100 m	12.21
1987	Pan American Games	Indianapolis, United States	17th (h)	200 m	25.13
1987	World Championships	Rome, Italy	22nd (h)	200 m	24.75
1988	Ibero-American Championships	Mexico City, Mexico	7th (h)	100 m	12.07 (w)
1988	Ibero-American Championships	Mexico City, Mexico	6th (h)	200 m	24.8
1990	Central American Games	San Pedro Sula, Honduras	1st	100 m	12.3
1990	Central American Games	San Pedro Sula, Honduras	1st	200 m	25.1
1990	Central American Games	San Pedro Sula, Honduras	1st	400 m	55.8
1990	Central American Games	San Pedro Sula, Honduras	1st	4 × 100 m relay	48.5
1990	Central American Games	San Pedro Sula, Honduras	1st	4 × 400 m relay	3:54.8
1990	Central American and Caribbean Games	Mexico City, Mexico	8th	100 m	12.05
1990	Central American and Caribbean Games	Mexico City, Mexico	5th	200 m	24.49
1991	Central American Championships	Tegucigalpa, Honduras	1st	100 m	12.01
1991	Central American Championships	Tegucigalpa, Honduras	1st	200 m	24.90
1991	Central American Championships	Tegucigalpa, Honduras	1st	400 m	55.29
1991	Pan American Games	Havana, Cuba	12th (h)	200 m	24.85
1991	Pan American Games	Havana, Cuba	14th (h)	400 m	56.42
1992	Olympic Games	Barcelona, Spain	44th (h)	100 m	12.12
1992	Olympic Games	Barcelona, Spain	41st (h)	200 m	24.64
1992	Olympic Games	Barcelona, Spain	27th (qf)	400 m	53.60
1993	Central American and Caribbean Games	Ponce, Puerto Rico	6th	200 m	24.24
1993	Central American and Caribbean Games	Ponce, Puerto Rico	2nd	400 m	52.57
1994	Central American Games	San Salvador, El Salvador	1st	100 m	12.21
1994	Central American Games	San Salvador, El Salvador	1st	400 m	55.52
1994	Central American Games	San Salvador, El Salvador	1st	800 m	2:14.0
1995	World Championships	Gothenburg, Sweden	37th (h)	400 m	53.48
1995	Universiade	Fukuoka, Japan	20th (qf)	200 m	24.38
1995	Universiade	Fukuoka, Japan	10th (sf)	400 m	53.59
1996	Olympic Games	Atlanta, United States	31st (h)	400 m	52.66
1997	World Championships	Athens, Greece	31st (h)	400 m	54.03
1997	Central American Games	San Pedro Sula, Honduras	3rd	100 m	11.9 (w)
1997	Central American Games	San Pedro Sula, Honduras	4th	200 m	25.37
1997	Central American Games	San Pedro Sula, Honduras	1st	400 m	54.74
1997	Central American Games	San Pedro Sula, Honduras	3rd	4 × 100 m relay	48.66
1997	Central American Games	San Pedro Sula, Honduras	3rd	4 × 400 m relay	3:54.97
1999	Pan American Games	Winnipeg, Canada	13th (h)	400 m	55.37
1999	World Championships	Seville, Spain	41st (h)	400 m	54.55

== Personal bests ==
Outdoor

- 100 metres – 11.72 (Xalapa 1990) NR
- 200 metres – 23.92 (Ponce 1993)
- 400 metres – 52.57 (Ponce 1993) NR

Indoor

- 200 metres – 24.87 (Lincoln 1998) NR
- 400 metres – 56.43 (Lincoln 1998) NR
