= Kriscia García =

Salvadoran long-distance runner

Personal information
- Full name: Kriscia Lorena García Blanco
- Nationality: Salvadoran
- Born: 20 September 1963 (age 62) Santa Ana Department, El Salvador
- Height: 1.49 m (4 ft 11 in)
- Weight: 43 kg (95 lb)

Sport
- Sport: Long-distance running
- Event: Marathon
Medal record
Representing El Salvador
Central American and Caribbean Games
Bronze medal – third place	1998 Maracaibo	Marathon
Central American Games
Gold medal – first place	1986 Guatemala City	3000m
Gold medal – first place	1997 San Pedro Sula	10,000m
Silver medal – second place	2001 Guatemala City	Marathon
Bronze medal – third place	1986 Guatemala City	1500m
Bronze medal – third place	1997 San Pedro Sula	5000m

Kriscia Lorena García Blanco (born 20 September 1963) is a Salvadoran long-distance runner.She competed in the women's marathon at the 1988 Summer Olympics. She finished seventh in the 1500 metres at the 1987 Pan American Games.

== International competitions ==
Year	Competition	Venue	Position	Event	Notes
Representing El Salvador
1980	Central American Championships	Guatemala City, Guatemala	4th	800 m	2:33.5
1980	Central American Championships	Guatemala City, Guatemala	2nd	1500 m	5:07.2
1983	World Championships	Helsinki, Finland	19th (h)	1500 m	4:40.21
1983	World Championships	Helsinki, Finland	29th (h)	3000 m	10:06.14
1984	Olympic Games	Los Angeles, United States	22nd (h)	1500 m	4:38.00
1984	Olympic Games	Los Angeles, United States	26th (h)	3000 m	9:42.28
1984	Central American Championships	Guatemala City, Guatemala	3rd	800 m	2:20.0
1984	Central American Championships	Guatemala City, Guatemala	1st	1500 m	4:44.1
1984	Central American Championships	Guatemala City, Guatemala	1st	3000 m	10:26.9
1984	Central American Championships	Guatemala City, Guatemala	3rd	4 × 400 m relay	4:15.0
1986	Central American and Caribbean Games	Guatemala City, Guatemala	3rd	1500 m	
1986	Central American and Caribbean Games	Guatemala City, Guatemala	1st	3000 m	10:30.2
1986	Ibero-American Championships	Havana, Cuba	6th	1500 m	4:38.54
1986	Ibero-American Championships	Havana, Cuba	7th	3000 m	9:57.67
1986	World Road Race Championships	Lisbon, Portugal	55th	15 km	54:23
1987	Pan American Games	Indianapolis, United States	7th	1500 m	4:34.29
1987	Pan American Games	Indianapolis, United States	9th	3000 m	10:09.03
1987	World Championships	Rome, Italy	29th (h)	1500 m	4:34.76
1988	Olympic Games	Seoul, South Korea	58th	Marathon	3:04:21
1992	Ibero-American Championships	Seville, Spain	10th	10,000 m	37:38.43
1995	Central American and Caribbean Championships	Guatemala City, Guatemala	3rd	10,000 m	37:52.26
1997	Central American Games	San Pedro Sula, Honduras	3rd	5000 m	18:38.8
1997	Central American Games	San Pedro Sula, Honduras	1st	10,000 m	38:36.39
1998	Central American and Caribbean Games	Maracaibo, Venezuela	3rd	Marathon	3:00:21
1998	Central American Championships	Guatemala City, Guatemala	1st	10,000 m	38:06.7
1999	Central American and Caribbean Championships	Bridgetown, Barbados	1st	Half marathon	1:26:25
1999	Pan American Games	Winnipeg, Canada	9th	Marathon	3:07:03
2001	Central American and Caribbean Championships	Guatemala City, Guatemala	5th	Half marathon	1:24:03
2001	Central American Games	Guatemala City, Guatemala	2nd	Marathon	3:02:25

== Personal bests ==
Outdoor

- 800 metres – 2:20.0 (1984)
- 1500 metres – 4:34.29 (1987)
- 3000 metres – 9:42.28 (Los Angeles 1984)
- 5000 metres – 17:11.7 (1986)
- 10,000 metres – 36:21.1 (1988)
- Marathon – 2:49:34 (San Salvador, 1988)
