= Julio René Martínez =

Guatemalan race walker

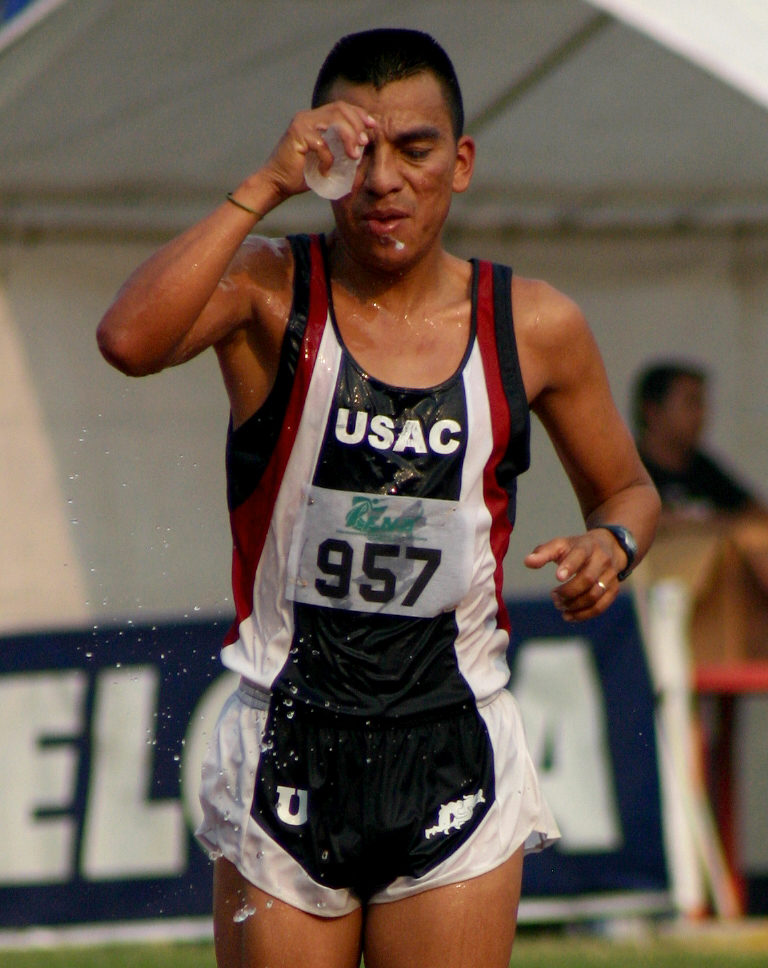

Personal information
- Full name: Julio René Martínez Sicán
- Born: September 27, 1973 (age 52) Fraijanes, Guatemala
- Height: 1.65 m (5 ft 5 in)
- Weight: 44 kg (97 lb)

Sport
- Country: Guatemala
- Sport: Men's Athletics
- Event: Racewalking
Medal record
Men's Athletics
Representing Guatemala
Pan American Games
Bronze medal – third place	1995 Mar del Plata	20 km
Ibero-American Championships
Silver medal – second place	2002 Ciudad de Guatemala	20 km
Silver medal – second place	1998 Lisbon	20 km
Central American and Caribbean Games
Bronze medal – third place	1998 Maracaibo	20 km
Bronze medal – third place	1993 Ponce	20 km
Central American and Caribbean Championships
Gold medal – first place	1997 San Juan	20 km
Gold medal – first place	2003 St. George's	20 km
Gold medal – first place	2005 Nassau	20 km
Silver medal – second place	1995 Ciudad de Guatemala	20 km
Bronze medal – third place	2001 Ciudad de Guatemala	20 km
Central American Games
Gold medal – first place	1997 San Pedro Sula	20 km
Gold medal – first place	1994 San Salvador	20 km
Silver medal – second place	2001 Ciudad de Guatemala	20 km
Central American Championships
Bronze medal – third place	2007 San José	20 km
Bronze medal – third place	2004 Managua	20 km
- Updated on 20 September 2012

Julio René Martínez Sicán (born 27 September 1973) is a Guatemalan race walker.

== Personal bests ==
- 20 km: 1:17:46 hrs – (Germany) Eisenhüttenstadt, 8 May 1999
- 50 km: 3:56:19 hrs – (Germany) Naumburg, 1 May 2004

== Achievements ==
Year	Competition	Venue	Position	Event	Notes
Representing Guatemala
1990	Pan American Race Walking Cup	Xalapa, Mexico	25th	20 km	1:48:49
1992	World Junior Championships	Seoul, South Korea	—	10,000 m	DQ
1993	Central American and Caribbean Games	Ponce, Puerto Rico	3rd	20 km	1:29:43
1994	Central American Games	San Salvador, El Salvador	1st	20 km	1:27:45
1995	Pan American Games	Mar del Plata, Argentina	3rd	20 km	1:23:50
1995	Central American and Caribbean Championships	Ciudad de Guatemala, Guatemala	2nd	20 km	1:25:10 A
1996	Olympic Games	Atlanta, Georgia	—	20 km	DQ
1997	World Race Walking Cup	Poděbrady, Czech Republic	5th	20 km	1:18:51
1997	Central American and Caribbean Championships	San Juan, Puerto Rico	1st	20 km	1:26:24.40 CR
1997	World Championships	Athens, Greece	—	20 km	DQ
1997	Central American Games	San Pedro Sula, Honduras	1st	20 km	1:35:45
1998	Ibero-American Championships	Lisbon, Portugal	2nd	20 km	1:26:25
1998	Central American and Caribbean Games	Maracaibo, Venezuela	3rd	20 km	1:25:31
1998	Central American Championships	Guatemala City, Guatemala	2nd	20,000 m	1:33:54
1999	Pan American Games	Winnipeg, Canada	4th	20 km	1:20:58
1999	World Championships	Seville, Spain	—	20 km	DQ
2000	Olympic Games	Sydney, Australia	43rd	20 km	1:31:47
2001	Central American and Caribbean Championships	Guatemala City, Guatemala	3rd	20 km	1:29:47 A
2001	Central American Games	Ciudad de Guatemala, Guatemala	2nd	20 km	1:27:53 A
2002	Ibero-American Championships	Ciudad de Guatemala, Guatemala	2nd	20,000 m	1:24:31
2002	Central American and Caribbean Games	San Salvador, El Salvador	—	20 km	DNF
2003	Central American and Caribbean Championships	St. George's, Grenada	1st	18,000 m	1:22:07
2003	Pan American Games	Santo Domingo, Dominican Republic	—	20 km	DQ
2003	Pan American Games	Santo Domingo, Dominican Republic	—	50 km	DNF
2003	World Championships	Paris, France	—	20 km	DQ
2004	World Race Walking Cup	Naumburg, Germany	15th	50 km	3:56:19
2004	Olympic Games	Athens, Greece	—	50 km	DQ
2004	Central American Championships	Managua, Nicaragua	3rd	20 km	1:33:20.46
2005	Central American and Caribbean Championships	Nassau, Bahamas	1st	20,000 m	1:30:38.07
2005	World Championships	Helsinki, Finland	12th	50 km	3:57:56
2006	Ibero-American Championships	Ponce, Puerto Rico	–	20,000 m	DQ
2006	Central American and Caribbean Games	Cartagena, Colombia	5th	20 km	1:33:00
2007	Central American Championships	San José, Costa Rica	3rd	20 km	1:27:30.42
2007	Pan American Games	Rio de Janeiro, Brazil	—	20 km	DQ

Records
Preceded by (China) Bu Lingtang	Men's 20km Walk World Record Holder equalled on 2000-05-19 by (Russia) Roman Rasskazov; 8 May 1999 – 28 April 2002	Succeeded by (Spain) Paquillo Fernández
