= 2003 Central American and Caribbean Cross Country Championships =

- Organisers: CACAC
- Edition: 19th
- Date: March 16
- Host city: Acapulco, Guerrero, Mexico
- Venue: Club de Golf Acapulco
- Events: 4
- Distances: 12 km – Senior men 8 km – Junior men (U20); 8 km – Senior women 6 km – Junior women (U20)
- Participation: 79 athletes from 8 nations

The 2003 Central American and Caribbean Cross Country Championships took place on March 16, 2003. The races were held at the Club de Golf Acapulco in Acapulco, Mexico.

Complete results, and results for junior and youth competitions, were published.

== Medallists ==
Event	Gold		Silver		Bronze	
Individual
Senior men (12 km)	Jonathan Morales; Mexico	39:43	José Acierno; Mexico	39:46	José Amado García; Guatemala	39:49
Junior (U20) men (8 km)	Arturo Merced; Mexico	26:29	Omar Rabid; Mexico	27:20	Wainard Talbert; Jamaica	27:40
Senior women (8 km)	Adriana Sánchez; Mexico	30:02	Angélica Sánchez; Mexico	30:24	Dolores Dávila; Mexico	30:35
Junior (U20) women (6 km)	Virginia Riverol; Mexico	22:57	Arilú Xicontécatl; Mexico	23:36	Liliana Méndez; Puerto Rico	24:05
Team
Senior men	Puerto Rico	29 pts	Jamaica	48 pts	Aruba	85 pts
Junior (U20) men	Puerto Rico	30 pts	Jamaica	41 pts	Saint Lucia	56 pts
Senior women	Mexico	6 pts	Puerto Rico	23 pts	U.S. Virgin Islands	40 pts
Junior (U20) women	Mexico	8 pts	Puerto Rico	18 pts	Jamaica	23 pts

== Race results ==
=== Senior men's race (12 km) ===
Individual race
Rank	Athlete	Country	Time
1st place, gold medalist(s)	Jonathan Morales	Mexico	39:43
2nd place, silver medalist(s)	José Acierno	Mexico	39:46
3rd place, bronze medalist(s)	José Amado García	Guatemala	39:49
4	Luis Collazo	Puerto Rico	40:00
5	Cayetano Hernández	Mexico	40:09
6	Jacinto Rodríguez	Puerto Rico	40:13
7	Michael Tomlim	Jamaica	41:10
8	César Lam	Puerto Rico	41:29
9	Selvin Molineros	Guatemala	41:38
10	Albert Donowa	Bermuda	41:41
11	Edgardo Cabán	Puerto Rico	41:52
12	Watson Roberts	Jamaica	42:25
13	Luis Rivera	Puerto Rico	42:50
14	Mario Smith	Jamaica	43:14
15	Phillips Edward	Jamaica	43:45
16	Lamar Edward	Jamaica	44:43
17	Máximo Olivares	Puerto Rico	45:11
18	Hedrik Ludwing	Aruba	45:23
19	Andrew Gutzmore	Jamaica	45:46
20	Glenn Semerel	Aruba	45:52
21	Richard Rodriguez	Aruba	46:06
22	William Bohlke	U.S. Virgin Islands	46:30
23	Jamal Hart	Bermuda	48:08
24	Calvin Dallas	U.S. Virgin Islands	48:47
25	Leopold Frederick	U.S. Virgin Islands	52:11
26	Arnol Brouwer	Aruba	55:41
—	Mitchell Esmert	U.S. Virgin Islands	DNF
—	David Galindo	Mexico	DNS

Teams
Rank	Team	Points
1st place, gold medalist(s)	Puerto Rico: Luis Collazo / 4; Jacinto Rodríguez / 6; César Lam / 8; Edgardo Cabán / 11	29
2nd place, silver medalist(s)	Jamaica: Michael Tomlim / 7; Watson Roberts / 12; Mario Smith / 14; Phillips Edward / 15	48
3rd place, bronze medalist(s)	Aruba: Hedrik Ludwing / 18; Glenn Semerel / 20; Richard Rodriguez / 21; Arnol Brouwer / 26	85

- Note: Athletes in parentheses did not score for the team result.

=== Junior (U20) men's race (8 km) ===
Individual race
Rank	Athlete	Country	Time
1st place, gold medalist(s)	Arturo Merced	Mexico	26:29
2nd place, silver medalist(s)	Omar Rabid	Mexico	27:20
3rd place, bronze medalist(s)	Wainard Talbert	Jamaica	27:40
4	David Pérez	Mexico	28:04
5	Malvin Cruz	Puerto Rico	28:43
6	Yamil León	Puerto Rico	29:26
7	Joseph Ray	Saint Lucia	29:28
8	Jason Elleson	Jamaica	29:31
9	Angel Vélez	Puerto Rico	29:39
10	Yadier León	Puerto Rico	30:05
11	Víctor Torres	Puerto Rico	30:20
12	Denides Vélez	Puerto Rico	30:42
13	Shawn Adams	Saint Lucia	30:43
14	Edward Rechardo	Jamaica	30:52
15	José Maduro	Aruba	31:42
16	Jason Craig	Jamaica	31:43
17	Jason Seville	Saint Lucia	31:43
18	Kamari Stevens	Jamaica	34:09
19	Michael Buscette	Saint Lucia	34:56
—	Yair Cedazo	Mexico	DNF
—	Andre Drummond	Jamaica	DNF

Teams
Rank	Team	Points
1st place, gold medalist(s)	Puerto Rico: Malvin Cruz / 5; Yamil León / 6; Angel Vélez / 9; Yadier León / 10	30
2nd place, silver medalist(s)	Jamaica: Wainard Talbert / 3; Jason Elleson / 8; Edward Rechardo / 14; Jason Craig / 16	41
3rd place, bronze medalist(s)	Saint Lucia: Joseph Ray / 7; Shawn Adams / 13; Jason Seville / 17; Michael Buscette / 19	56

- Note: Athletes in parentheses did not score for the team result.

=== Senior women's race (8 km) ===
Individual race
Rank	Athlete	Country	Time
1st place, gold medalist(s)	Adriana Sánchez	Mexico	30:02
2nd place, silver medalist(s)	Angélica Sánchez	Mexico	30:24
3rd place, bronze medalist(s)	Dolores Dávila	Mexico	30:35
4	Dolores Valencia	Mexico	31:21
5	Maribel Burgos	Puerto Rico	31:32
6	Elsa Monterroso	Guatemala	31:38
7	Lourdes Cruz	Puerto Rico	31:57
8	Herlinda Xol	Guatemala	33:05
9	Ashley Cooper	Bermuda	33:08
10	Jodey Johnson	Jamaica	34:11
11	Carmen Valdez	Puerto Rico	34:22
12	Lisha Hamilton	U.S. Virgin Islands	34:27
13	Ruth David	U.S. Virgin Islands	34:34
14	Arieta Martin	Jamaica	35:24
15	Rachel Witty	U.S. Virgin Islands	36.42
16	Teresa Harper	U.S. Virgin Islands	37:36
17	Kenisha Anderson	Jamaica	37:46
18	Jorraime Maduro	Aruba	38:46
19	Annett Thompson	Jamaica	46:03

Teams
Rank	Team	Points
1st place, gold medalist(s)	Mexico: Adriana Sánchez / 1; Angélica Sánchez / 2; Dolores Dávila / 3	6
2nd place, silver medalist(s)	Puerto Rico: Maribel Burgos / 5; Lourdes Cruz / 7; Carmen Valdez / 11	23
3rd place, bronze medalist(s)	U.S. Virgin Islands: Lisha Hamilton / 12; Ruth David / 13; Rachel Witty / 15	40
4	Jamaica: Jodey Johnson / 10; Arieta Martin / 14; Kenisha Anderson / 17	41

- Note: Athletes in parentheses did not score for the team result.

=== Junior (U20) women's race (6 km) ===
Individual race
Rank	Athlete	Country	Time
1st place, gold medalist(s)	Virginia Riverol	Mexico	22:57
2nd place, silver medalist(s)	Arilú Xicontécatl	Mexico	23:36
3rd place, bronze medalist(s)	Liliana Méndez	Puerto Rico	24:05
4	Tamica Thomas	Jamaica	24:10
5	Alma Mendoza	Mexico	24:11
6	Beverly Ramos	Puerto Rico	24:25
7	Sarahí Hernández	Mexico	24:42
8	Vanessa Whittle	Jamaica	25:04
9	Erika Méndez	Puerto Rico	25:49
10	Eva Guzman	Puerto Rico	26:13
11	Samantha Gallimore	Jamaica	28:26
12	Cassandra Powell	Jamaica	29:26

Teams
Rank	Team	Points
1st place, gold medalist(s)	Mexico: Virginia Riverol / 1; Arilú Xicontécatl / 2; Alma Mendoza / 5	8
2nd place, silver medalist(s)	Puerto Rico: Liliana Méndez / 3; Beverly Ramos / 6; Erika Méndez / 9	18
3rd place, bronze medalist(s)	Jamaica: Tamica Thomas / 4; Vanessa Whittle / 8; Samantha Gallimore / 11	23

- Note: Athletes in parentheses did not score for the team result.

== Medal table (unofficial) ==
* Host nation (Mexico)

Rank	Nation	Gold	Silver	Bronze	Total
1	Mexico (MEX)*	6	4	1	11
2	Puerto Rico (PUR)	2	2	1	5
3	Jamaica (JAM)	0	2	2	4
4	Aruba (ARU)	0	0	1	1
4	Guatemala (GUA)	0	0	1	1
4	Saint Lucia (LCA)	0	0	1	1
4	U.S. Virgin Islands (ISV)	0	0	1	1
Totals (7 entries)		8	8	8	24

- Note: Totals include both individual and team medals, with medals in the team competition counting as one medal.

== Participation ==
According to an unofficial count, 79 athletes from 8 countries participated.

- Aruba (6)
- Bermuda (3)
- Guatemala (4)
- Jamaica (20)
- Mexico (15)
- Puerto Rico (19)
- Saint Lucia (4)
- U.S. Virgin Islands (8)

== See also ==
- 2003 in athletics (track and field)
