= Elsa Monterroso =

Guatemalan long-distance runner

Personal information
- Born: 13 December 1971 (age 54)

Sport
- Sport: Track and field
Medal record
Representing Guatemala
Central American Games
Gold medal – first place	1994 San Salvador	1500 m
Gold medal – first place	2001 Guatemala City	1500 m
Gold medal – first place	2001 Guatemala City	5000 m
Gold medal – first place	2001 Guatemala City	10,000 m
Silver medal – second place	1994 San Salvador	3000 m
Silver medal – second place	1997 San Pedro Sula	5000 m
Bronze medal – third place	1994 San Salvador	4x400 m relay
Bronze medal – third place	1997 San Pedro Sula	1500 m
NACAC Championships
Bronze medal – third place	2007 San Salvador	5000 m

Elsa Elizabeth Monterroso (born 13 December 1971) is a Guatemalan former long-distance runner who competed over distances from 1500 metres up to the half marathon. She was active in the 1990s and 2000s. She represented her country at the 2003 Pan American Games and was twice a finalist. She competed twice at world level, at the 2000 IAAF World Half Marathon Championships and the 2004 IAAF World Cross Country Championships.

She was highly successful at competitions in the Central American region. She took a three golds and broke three Games records at the 2001 Central American Games and was a seven-time winner at the Central American Championships in Athletics. She was also a bronze medallist at the 2007 NACAC Championships in Athletics and a five-time bronze medallist at the Central American and Caribbean Championships in Athletics.

Monterroso holds the Guatemalan national records in the 3000 metres, 5000 metres and 10,000 metres.

== Personal bests ==
- 1500 metres – 4:34.55 min (2001)
- 3000 metres – 9:42.33 min (1994) NR
- 5000 metres – 17:03.41 min (2002) NR
- 10,000 metres – 35:54.46 min (2003) NR
- Half marathon – 78:59 min (2003)

== International competitions ==
Year	Competition	Venue	Position	Event	Notes
1991	Central American Championships	Tegucigalpa, Honduras	1st	800 m	2:22.32
1991	Central American Championships	Tegucigalpa, Honduras	1st	1500 m	4:55.73
1993	CAC Championships	Cali, Colombia	3rd	1500 m	4:34.59
1993	CAC Championships	Cali, Colombia	3rd	3000 m	10:09.18
1994	Central American Games	San Salvador, El Salvador	1st	1500 m	4:42.80
1994	Central American Games	San Salvador, El Salvador	2nd	3000 m	
1994	Central American Games	San Salvador, El Salvador	3rd	4 × 400 m relay	
1994	Ibero-American Championships	Mar del Plata, Argentina	4th	1500 m	4:43.16
1994	Ibero-American Championships	Mar del Plata, Argentina	6th	3000 m	9:42.33
1996	Ibero-American Championships	Medellín, Colombia	11th	1500 m	4:43.44
1997	Central American Games	San Pedro Sula, Honduras	3rd	1500 m	4:39.31
1997	Central American Games	San Pedro Sula, Honduras	2nd	5000 m	18:00.5
1997	CAC Championships	San Juan, Puerto Rico	3rd	10,000 m	36:57.30
1998	CAC Games	Maracaibo, Venezuela	7th	5000 m	17:48.27
1998	Central American Championships	Guatemala City, Guatemala	3rd	5000 m	18:45.3
2000	South American Cross Country Championships	Cartagena, Colombia	— (guest)	Senior race	30:05
2000	World Half Marathon Championships	Veracruz, Mexico	49th	Half marathon	1:30:30
2000	World Half Marathon Championships	Veracruz, Mexico	9th	Team	4:33:36
2001	Central American Games		1st	1500 m	4:34.55 GR
2001	Central American Games		1st	5000 m	17:19.10 GR
2001	Central American Games		1st	10,000 m	36:07.26 GR
2001	CAC Championships	Guatemala City, Guatemala	3rd	5000 m	17:17.00
2001	CAC Championships	Guatemala City, Guatemala	3rd	10,000 m	36:57.30
2002	Central American Championships	San José, Costa Rica	2nd	1500 m	4:47.72
2002	Central American Championships	San José, Costa Rica	3rd	5000 m	18:01.34
2002	CAC Games	San Salvador, El Salvador	7th	1500 m	4:39.48
2002	CAC Games	San Salvador, El Salvador	4th	5000 m	17:03.41 NR
2002	Ibero-American Championships	Guatemala City, Guatemala	—	5000 m	DNF
2003	CAC Cross Country Championships	Acapulco, Mexico	6th	Senior race	31:38
2003	Central American Championships	Guatemala City, Guatemala	1st	1500 m	4:40.58
2003	Central American Championships	Guatemala City, Guatemala	1st	5000 m	17:38.32 CR
2003	Central American Championships	Guatemala City, Guatemala	1st	10,000 m	37:28.80
2003	CAC Championships	St. George's, Bermuda	3rd	1500 m	4:39.44
2003	CAC Championships	St. George's, Bermuda	2nd	10,000 m	35:54.46 NR
2003	Pan American Games	Santo Domingo, Dominican Republic	11th	1500 m	4:46.53
2003	Pan American Games	Santo Domingo, Dominican Republic	8th	5000 m	17:13.72
2003	Pan American Games	Santo Domingo, Dominican Republic	7th	10,000 m	36:24.23
2004	World Cross Country Championships	Brussels, Belgium	82nd	Short race	15:53
2004	World Cross Country Championships	Brussels, Belgium	88th	Senior race	33:21
2004	Central American Championships	Managua, Nicaragua	1st	5000 m	18:00.62
2004	Central American Championships	Managua, Nicaragua	1st	10,000 m	36:23.42
2005	CAC Championships	Nassau, Bahamas	5th	5000 m	18:03.15
2005	CAC Championships	Nassau, Bahamas	6th	10,000 m	39:59.45
2007	Central American Cross Country Championships	Lord's Bank, Belize	1st	Senior race	31:32
2007	NACAC Championships	San Salvador, El Salvador	3rd	5000 m	17:59.85
2007	Central American Championships	San José, Costa Rica	1st	5000 m	18:43.87
2007	Central American Championships	San José, Costa Rica	1st	10,000 m	39:03.18
2009	Central American Championships	Guatemala City, Guatemala	3rd	5000 m	18:23.77
