= Alberto López (sprinter) =

Guatemalan sprinter

Personal information
- Nationality: Guatemalan
- Born: 18 February 1963 (age 63) Guatemala City, Guatemala
- Height: 1.75 m (5 ft 9 in)
- Weight: 68 kg (150 lb)

Sport
- Sport: Sprinting
- Event: 400 metres
Medal record
Men's athletics
Representing Guatemala
Central American Championships
Silver medal – second place	1984 Guatemala City	800 m

Alberto López Dávila (born 18 February 1963) is a Guatemalan sprinter. He competed in the men's 400 metres at the 1984 Summer Olympics.

López qualified for his first global championship at the 1983 Summer Universiade, placing 6th in his heat in the 800 metres.

López placed 8th in his 400 m heat and 6th in his 400 m heat at the 1984 Olympics, failing to advance in both events. Later that year at the 1984 Central American Championships in Athletics on 15-18 August, López won the silver medal in the 800 m.

López qualified for the finals in both the 800 m and 1500 m at the 1986 Ibero-American Championships, finishing 6th and 5th respectively.

At the 1987 IAAF World Indoor Championships, López ran both the 800 m and 1500 m again. He finished 7th in his 800 m heat, ranking 22nd overall, and he ranked 17th in the 1500 m by placing 10th in his heat.

López moved to San Francisco and attended the City College of San Francisco in the 1980s, where he competed for the CCSF Rams track and field team.

== Personal bests ==
Outdoor

- 400 metres – 50.4 (1983)
- 800 metres – 1:52.78 (1986)
