= Athletics at the 1999 Pan American Games – Women's marathon =

Women's marathon at the Pan American Games

The women's marathon event at the 1999 Pan American Games was held on July 25.

== Results ==
Rank	Name	Nationality	Time	Notes
1st place, gold medalist(s)	Érika Olivera	Chile	2:37:41	GR
2nd place, silver medalist(s)	Iglandini González	Colombia	2:40:06	
3rd place, bronze medalist(s)	Viviany de Oliveira	Brazil	2:40:55	
4	Marlene Flores	Chile	2:43:59	
5	Patrícia Jardon	Mexico	2:44:52	
6	María Elena Reyna	Mexico	2:50:30	
7	Jennifer Crain	United States	2:54:19	
8	Gina Coello	Honduras	3:00:17	
9	Kriscia García	El Salvador	3:07:03	
