= Athletics at the 1987 Pan American Games – Women's marathon =

Women's marathon at the Pan American Games

The women's marathon event at the 1987 Pan American Games was held in Indianapolis, United States on 9 August. It was the first time that this event was contested at the Games.

== Results ==
Rank	Name	Nationality	Time	Notes
1st place, gold medalist(s)	María del Carmen Cárdenas	Mexico	2:52:06	GR
2nd place, silver medalist(s)	Debbie Warner	United States	2:54:49	
3rd place, bronze medalist(s)	Maribel Durruty	Cuba	2:56:21	
4	Kathy Molitor	United States	2:59:58	
5	Ena Guevara	Peru	3:01:04	
6	Nelly Chávez	Bolivia	3:02:48	
7	Margarita Galicia	Mexico	3:03:01	
8	Zoila Muñoz	Ecuador	3:06:06	NR
9	Gina Coello	Honduras	3:07:29	
10	Esperanza Melville	Guatemala	3:12:52	
11	Trinidad Rodríguez	Puerto Rico	3:16:37	
	Cornelia Melis	Aruba	DNS	
