= Athletics at the 1987 Pan American Games – Men's 110 metres hurdles =

Men's 110 metres hurdles at the Pan American Games

The men's 110 metres hurdles event at the 1987 Pan American Games was held in Indianapolis, United States on 15 August.

== Results ==
Wind: +4.4 m/s

Rank	Lane	Name	Nationality	Time	Notes
1st place, gold medalist(s)	7	Andrew Parker	Jamaica	13.82	
2nd place, silver medalist(s)	1	Modesto Castillo	Dominican Republic	13.96	
3rd place, bronze medalist(s)	4	Ernesto Torres	Puerto Rico	14.68	
4	5	George Biehl	Chile	14.89	
5	6	Mauricio Carranza	El Salvador	15.72	
	2	Greg Foster	United States	DNF	
	3	Cletus Clark	United States	DNF	
