= Athletics at the 1991 Pan American Games – Men's triple jump =

Men's triple jump at the Pan American Games

The men's triple jump event at the 1991 Pan American Games was held in Havana, Cuba on 10 August.

== Results ==
Rank	Name	Nationality	#1	#2	#3	#4	#5	#6	Result	Notes
1st place, gold medalist(s)	Yoelbi Quesada	Cuba	16.31	16.94	16.42	16.54	17.06	16.81	17.06	
2nd place, silver medalist(s)	Anísio Silva	Brazil	16.28	x	16.20	16.55	16.66	16.72	16.72	
3rd place, bronze medalist(s)	Wendell Lawrence	Bahamas	x	16.47	x	16.69	x	16.45	16.69	
4	Ray Kimble	United States	15.89	15.86	16.41	16.31	x	16.44	16.44	
5	Brian Wellman	Bermuda	16.34	16.40	x	15.70	x	16.03	16.40	
6	Robert Cannon	United States	x	15.96	15.53	–	15.86	–	15.96	
7	Oral Ogilvie	Canada	x	14.93	x	x	–	x	14.93	
8	Gregorio Hernández	Cuba	x	14.19	x	14.89	–	–	14.89	
9	Mauricio Carranza	El Salvador	x	13.27	13.79				13.79	
