= Luis Munguía =

Nicaraguan middle-distance runner

Personal information
- Full name: Luis Munguía Ramírez
- Born: 1958 (age 67–68)

Sport
- Sport: Athletics
- Events: 800 metres, 1500 metres

Luis Munguía Ramírez (born 1958) is a retired Nicaraguan middle-distance runner. He represented his country at the inaugural 1983 World Championships in Helsinki.

== International competitions ==
Year	Competition	Venue	Position	Event	Notes
Representing Nicaragua
1982	Central American and Caribbean Games	Havana, Cuba	8th	1500 m	4:07.77
1982	Central American and Caribbean Games	Havana, Cuba	6th	4 × 400 m relay	3:20.64
1983	World Championships	Helsinki, Finland	55th (h)	800 m	1:55.77
1983	World Championships	Helsinki, Finland	48th (h)	1500 m	4:02.06
1983	Pan American Games	Caracas, Venezuela	12th (h)	800 m	1:53.03
1983	Pan American Games	Caracas, Venezuela	9th	1500 m	3:54.68
1984	Central American Championships	Guatemala City, Guatemala	3rd	800 m	1:55.3
1986	Central American Games	Guatemala City, Guatemala	3rd	800 m	
1986	Central American Games	Guatemala City, Guatemala	1st	4 × 400 m relay	3:20.98
