= Gina Coello =

Honduran long-distance runner

Personal information
- Full name: Gina Lizeth Coello Touche
- Nationality: Honduran
- Born: 2 October 1962 (age 63)
- Height: 1.60 m (5 ft 3 in)
- Weight: 44 kg (97 lb)

Sport
- Sport: Long-distance running
- Event: Marathon
Medal record
Women's athletics
Representing Honduras
Central American Games
Gold medal – first place	1990 Tegucigalpa	Marathon
Silver medal – second place	1994 San Salvador	Marathon
Gold medal – first place	1997 San Pedro Sula	Marathon
Central American Championships
Bronze medal – third place	1991 Tegucigalpa	3000 m

Gina Lizeth Coello Touche (born 2 October 1962) is a Honduran long-distance runner. She competed in the women's marathon at the 2000 Summer Olympics.

== Career ==
In 1982, Coello broke the Honduran U20 1500 m record at a meeting in Tegucigalpa, running 4:57.7 minutes.

Coello represented Honduras at the 1987 Pan American Games. She finished 9th in the marathon, running 3:07:29 hours. Later that month at the 1987 World Championships in Athletics, Coello improved to 3:01:53 in the world championship marathon, finishing 31st and setting a Honduran national record.

In September 1989, Coello set the Honduran 3000 metres national record, running 10:46.30 minutes at a meeting in San José, Guatemala.

Coello won her first Central American Games medal at the 1990 edition, winning gold in the marathon. Her time was 3:13:10 hours over the Tegucigalpa course in her home country.

At the 1991 Central American Championships in Athletics in June, Coello won the bronze medal in the 3000 metres, the longest women's distance offered, in 10:59.22 minutes. Later that year, Coello finished 23rd at the 1991 World Championships marathon in another national record time of 2:59:54.

In October 1994, Coello finished 6th at the Ibero-American Championships 15000 m finals in 5:16.38. At the 1994 Central American Games in El Salvador, Coello won the marathon silver medal behind Maritza Martínez of Costa Rica, running 3:11:13 hours.

Coello finished 52nd at the 1997 World Championships marathon in 3:17:33. She followed that by winning her second Central American Games marathon gold medal, running 3:23:51 at the event in San Pedro Sula, Honduras.

In February 1999, Coello ran 2:59:37 at the Los Angeles Marathon to set a new personal best. She finished 8th at the 1999 Pan American Games marathon in 3:00:17 and then placed 41st at the 1999 World Championships, setting another national record in 2:58:11. At the 1999 IAAF World Half Marathon Championships, Coello ran 1:30:27 hours for 64th place.

Coello qualified to represent Honduras at the 2000 Olympics. In the Olympic marathon, she placed 42nd in 3:02:32. At a separate marathon in 2000, Coello ran her personal best of 2:58:00.

== Personal life ==
Coello lived with her domestic partner Juan Arnelo Henríquez Petit. In 2009, Petit died and was suspected to have been killed in response to his complaints against white-tailed deer hunting.
