= José Amado García =

Guatemalan long-distance runner

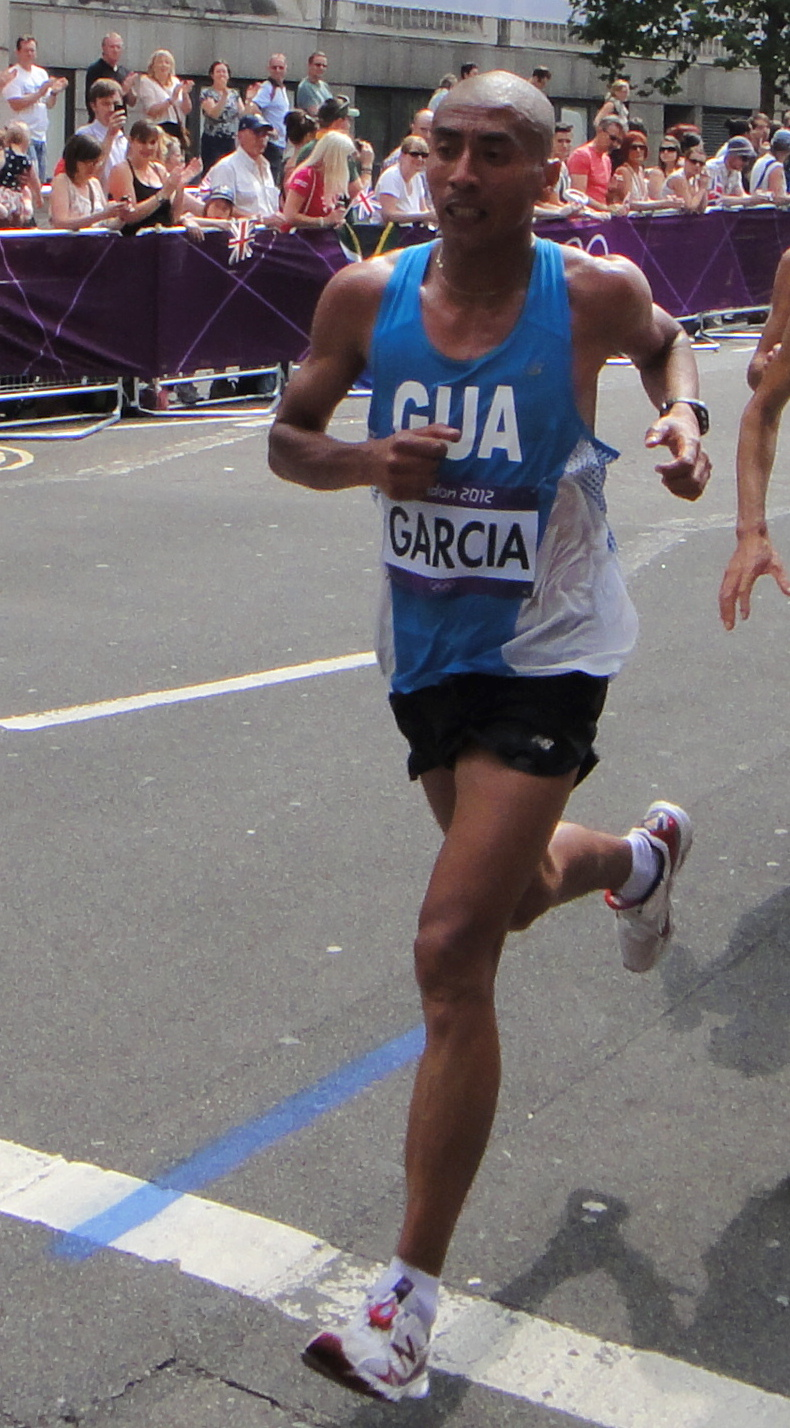
- García in the marathon at the 2012 Summer Olympics in London

Personal information
- Full name: José Amado García Gabriel
- Born: 13 September 1977 (age 48) San Jerónimo, Baja Verapaz, Guatemala
- Height: 1.77 m (5 ft 9 1/2 in)
- Weight: 59 kg (130 lb)

Sport
- Country: Guatemala
- Sport: Men's Athletics
- Event: Long distance running
Medal record
Men's athletics
Representing Guatemala
Pan American Games
Silver medal – second place	2007 Rio de Janeiro	Marathon
Central American and Caribbean Games
Gold medal – first place	2010 Mayagüez	Marathon
Central American Games
Gold medal – first place	2001 Guatemala City	5000 m
Gold medal – first place	2013 San José	Marathon
Silver medal – second place	1997 San Pedro Sula	10,000 m
Silver medal – second place	2001 Guatemala City	10,000 m
Central American Championships
Gold medal – first place	2002 San José	10,000 m
Gold medal – first place	2003 Guatemala City	5000 m
Gold medal – first place	2003 Guatemala City	10,000 m
Gold medal – first place	2005 San José	10,000 m
Gold medal – first place	2007 San José	5000 m
Gold medal – first place	2007 San José	10,000 m
Gold medal – first place	2009 Guatemala City	5000 m
Gold medal – first place	2010 Guatemala City	10,000 m
Silver medal – second place	2002 San José	5000 m
- Updated on 17 December 2014

José Amado García Gabriel (born 13 September 1977) is a Guatemalan long-distance runner who competed in the 2004 Summer Olympics, the 2008 Summer Olympics the 2012 Summer Olympics and the 2016 Summer Olympics.

== Personal bests ==
- 5000 m: 14:13.19 min – Berkeley, United States, 24 April 2010
- 10,000 m: 28:50.25 min – Palo Alto, United States, 1 May 2010
- Half marathon: 1:04:20 hrs – Warsaw, Poland, 18 June 2016
- Marathon: 2:14:27 hrs – Rio de Janeiro, Brazil, 29 July 2007

== Achievements ==
Year	Competition	Venue	Position	Event	Notes
Representing Guatemala
1997	Central American Games	San Pedro Sula, Honduras	2nd	10,000 m	33:05.17
1998	Central American Championships	Guatemala City, Guatemala	2nd	5000 m	15:47.6
1998	Central American Championships	Guatemala City, Guatemala	2nd	10,000 m	33:22.2
1999	World Cross Country Championships	Belfast, United Kingdom	134th	12 km	47:52
2000	Central American and Caribbean Cross Country Championships	Cartagena, Colombia	6th	12 km	39:50
2001	Central American and Caribbean Championships	Guatemala City, Guatemala	6th	5000 m	14:57.04
2001	Central American and Caribbean Championships	Guatemala City, Guatemala	3rd	10,000 m	30:53.52
2001	Central American Games	Guatemala City, Guatemala	1st	5000 m	14:28.91 A
2001	Central American Games	Guatemala City, Guatemala	2nd	10,000 m	30:43.86 A
2002	Central American Championships	San José, Costa Rica	2nd	5000 m	14:30.14
2002	Central American Championships	San José, Costa Rica	1st	10,000 m	30:05.31
2002	Central American and Caribbean Games	San Salvador, El Salvador	5th	5000 m	14:33.50
2002	Central American and Caribbean Games	San Salvador, El Salvador	5th	10,000 m	30:30.30
2003	Central American and Caribbean Cross Country Championships	Acapulco, Mexico	3rd	12 km	39:49
2003	World Cross Country Championships	Lausanne, Switzerland	75th	12.355 km	40:35
2003	Central American Championships	Guatemala City, Guatemala	1st	5000 m	15:19.35
2003	Central American Championships	Guatemala City, Guatemala	1st	10,000 m	30:16.25
2003	Pan American Games	Santo Domingo, Dominican Republic	–	5000 m	DNF
2003	Pan American Games	Santo Domingo, Dominican Republic	7th	10,000 m	30:26.61
2003	Central American and Caribbean Championships	St. George's, Grenada	2nd	5000 m	14:40.94
2003	Central American and Caribbean Championships	St. George's, Grenada	3rd	10,000 m	29:42.52
2004	Olympic Games	Athens, Greece	64th	Marathon	2:27:13
2005	World Cross Country Championships	Saint-Galmier, France	121st	4.196 km	13:27
2005	Central American Championships	San José, Costa Rica	1st	10,000 m	30:11.54
2005	World Championships	Helsinki, Finland	—	Marathon	DNF
2006	NACAC Cross Country Championships	Clermont, United States	10th	8 km	26:38
2006	NACAC Cross Country Championships	Clermont, United States	3rd	8 km (Team)	48 pts
2006	World Cross Country Championships	Fukuoka, Japan	104th	12 km	39:35
2006	Ibero-American Championships	Ponce, Puerto Rico	8th	5000 m	14:31.55
2006	Central American and Caribbean Games	Cartagena, Colombia	6th	5000 m	14:27.54
2006	Central American and Caribbean Games	Cartagena, Colombia	4th	10,000 m	30:09.31
2007	NACAC Cross Country Championships	Clermont, United States	13th	8 km	26:10
2007	NACAC Cross Country Championships	Clermont, United States	2nd	8 km (Team)	58 pts
2007	Central American Championships	San José, Costa Rica	1st	5000 m	14:42.08
2007	Central American Championships	San José, Costa Rica	1st	10,000 m	29:53.61
2007	NACAC Championships	San Salvador, El Salvador	3rd	5000 m	14:33.31
2007	NACAC Championships	San Salvador, El Salvador	2nd	10,000 m	29:42.11
2007	Pan American Games	Rio de Janeiro, Brazil	2nd	Marathon	2:14:27
2008	Olympic Games	Beijing, China	35th	Marathon	2:20:15
2009	Central American Championships	Guatemala City, Guatemala	1st	5000 m	14:55.44
2009	World Championships	Berlin, Germany	47th	Marathon	2:22:00
2010	Central American and Caribbean Games	Mayagüez, Puerto Rico	1st	Marathon	2:21:35
2010	Central American Championships	Guatemala City, Guatemala	1st	10,000 m	32:06.26
2011	Pan American Games	Guadalajara, Mexico	5th	Marathon	2:20:27 SB
2012	Olympic Games	London, United Kingdom	38th	Marathon	2:18:23
2013	Central American Games	San José, Costa Rica	1st	Marathon	2:26:26
2013	Bolivarian Games	Trujillo, Peru	7th	Half marathon	1:08:45
2014	Central American and Caribbean Games	Xalapa, Mexico	2nd	Marathon	2:19:45 A
2016	2016 Summer Olympics	Rio de Janeiro, Brazil	118th	Marathon	2:30:11
2017	World Championships	London, United Kingdom	58th	Marathon	2:25:03
