= 2003 Central American and Caribbean Championships in Athletics =

19th Central American and Caribbean Championships
- Dates: 4–6 July
- Host city: St. George's, Grenada
- Venue: National Stadium
- Level: Senior
- Events: 43
- Participation: At least 318 athletes from 29 nations

The 2003 Central American and Caribbean Championships in athletics were held in St George's, Grenada, between 4–6 July 2003. It was the first time that the country had hosted the competition.

== Medal summary ==
=== Men's events ===
Event	Gold		Silver		Bronze	
100 m	Kim Collins; Saint Kitts and Nevis	10.13	Darrel Brown; Trinidad and Tobago	10.17	Marc Burns; Trinidad and Tobago	10.29
200 m	Dominic Demeritte; Bahamas	20.43	Julieon Raeburn; Trinidad and Tobago	20.57	Christopher Williams; Jamaica	20.58
400 m	Alleyne Francique; Grenada	45.27	Chris Brown; Bahamas	45.42	Ato Modibo; Trinidad and Tobago	45.81
800 m	Sherridan Kirk; Trinidad and Tobago	1:49.10	Jermaine Myers; Jamaica	1:49.36	Marvin Watts; Jamaica	1:49.48
1500 m	Juan Luis Barrios; Mexico	3:44.78	Ricky Etheridge; Puerto Rico	3:48.68	Mario Smith; Jamaica	3:52.22
5000 m †	Eduardo Rojas; Mexico	14:29.88	José Amado García; Guatemala	14:40.94	Pamenos Ballantyne; Saint Vincent and the Grenadines	14:43.72
10,000 m	Eduardo Rojas; Mexico	29:37.08	Alfredo Arevalo; Guatemala	29:39.48	José Amado García; Guatemala	29:42.52
Half marathon	Pamenos Ballantyne; Saint Vincent and the Grenadines	1:09:14	Alfredo Arevalo; Guatemala	1:09:39	Claude Nohile; Martinique	1:10:59
3000 m steeplechase †	Alex Greaux; Puerto Rico	8:39.68	Néstor Nieves; Venezuela	8:40.27		
110 m hurdles †	Hugh Henry; Barbados	13.85	Alleyne Lett; Grenada	13.98	Ricardo Melbourne; Jamaica	14.01
400 m hurdles	Greg Little; Jamaica	50.04	Sergio Hierrezuelo; Cuba	50.26	Oscar Juanz; Mexico	50.34
High jump	Lisvany Pérez; Cuba	2.21	Huguens Jean; Haiti	2.15	Henderson Dottin; Barbados	2.15
Pole vault †	Giovanni Lanaro; Mexico	5.30	Ricardo Diez; Venezuela	5.00		
Long jump	Kareem Streete-Thompson; Cayman Islands	8.12w	Osbourne Moxey; Bahamas	7.85w	Aundre Edwards; Jamaica	7.74w
Triple jump	Leevan Sands; Bahamas	17.16	Gregory Hughes; Barbados	16.17	Ayata Joseph; Antigua and Barbuda	15.94
Shot put	Yojer Medina; Venezuela	19.12	Francisco Guzmán; Mexico	17.82	Dave Stoute; Trinidad and Tobago	17.70
Discus throw	Alfredo Romero; Puerto Rico	54.09	Alleyne Lett; Grenada	53.14	David Bissoly; Martinique	52.38
Hammer throw †	Yosvany Suárez; Cuba	69.59	Aldo Bello; Venezuela	64.26	Raúl Rivera; Guatemala	60.94
Javelin throw	Manuel Fuenmayor; Venezuela	72.35	Rigoberto Calderón; Nicaragua	67.50	Robert Barnes; Jamaica	66.57
Decathlon	Yonelvis Águila; Cuba	7337	Decosma Wright; Jamaica	6383	Guillermo Toledo; Puerto Rico	6074
20 km road walk †	Julio Martínez; Guatemala	1:22:07	José Olivares; Mexico	1:24:02	Ezequiel Nazario; Puerto Rico	1:26:01
4 x 100 m relay	Trinidad and Tobago	39.05	Jamaica	39.2	Netherlands Antilles	39.46
4 × 400 m relay	Bahamas; Avard Moncur; Carl Oliver; Nathaniel McKinney; Chris Brown	3:02.56	Jamaica; Marvin Essor; Lanceford Spence; Jermaine Myers; Richard James	3:04.08	Trinidad and Tobago; Damion Barry; Julieon Raeburn; Simeon Bovell; Sherridan Kirk	3:04.48

=== Women's events ===
Event	Gold		Silver		Bronze	
100 m	Fana Ashby; Trinidad and Tobago	11.32	Tamica Clarke; Bahamas	11.33	Judith Kitson; Jamaica	11.37
200 m	Cydonie Mothersille; Cayman Islands	22.45	Roxana Díaz; Cuba	22.74	Tonique Williams; Bahamas	22.8
400 m	Hazel-Ann Regis; Grenada	51.56	Michelle Burgher; Jamaica	52.19	Eliana Pacheco; Venezuela	52.87
800 m	Neisha Bernard-Thomas; Grenada	2:04.12	Kenia Sinclair; Jamaica	2:04.50	Sheena Gooding; Barbados	2:04.55
1500 m †	Ashley Couper; Bermuda	4:27.71	Margarita Tapia; Mexico	4:32.16	Elsa Monterroso; Guatemala	4:39.44
10,000 m †	Yudelkis Martínez; Cuba	34:29.05	Elsa Monterroso; Guatemala	35:54.46	Lourdes Cruz; Puerto Rico	38:27.73
Half marathon †	Lourdes Cruz; Puerto Rico	1:31:50	Adelaide Carrington; Saint Vincent and the Grenadines	1:38:45	Kenisha Pascal; Grenada	2:02:28 NR
100 m hurdles	Delloreen Ennis-London; Jamaica	12.70 CR	Nadine Faustin; Haiti	12.82	Vonette Dixon; Jamaica	13.35
400 m hurdles	Allison Beckford; Jamaica	55.12 CR	Yvonne Harrison; Puerto Rico	55.29	Andrea Blackett; Barbados	56.12
High jump	Desiree Crichlow; Barbados	1.81	Yetzálida Pérez; Venezuela	1.79	Keitha Moseley; Barbados	1.76
Pole vault †	Alejandra Meza; Mexico	4.00 (CR)	Denisse Orengo; Puerto Rico	3.90		
Long jump	Elva Goulbourne; Jamaica	6.96w	Jackie Edwards; Bahamas	6.63w	Yuridia Bustamante; Mexico	6.28w
Triple jump	Suzette Lee; Jamaica	13.89w	María Espencer; Dominican Republic	13.41w	Michelle Vaughn; Guyana	12.74
Shot put	Misleydis González; Cuba	18.09	Cleopatra Borel; Trinidad and Tobago	17.79	Rosario Ramos; Venezuela	15.02
Discus throw	Yania Ferrales; Cuba	59.07	María Cubillán; Venezuela	49.05	Doris Thompson; Bahamas	43.88
Hammer throw †	Violeta Guzmán; Mexico	55.72	Adriana Benaventa; Venezuela	50.82		
Javelin throw	Laverne Eve; Bahamas	56.75	Kateema Riettie; Jamaica	51.36	Dalila Rugama; Nicaragua	47.40
10 km road walk †	Rosario Sánchez; Mexico	49:06	Estela Hernández; Mexico	52:03		
4 × 100 m relay	Bahamas; Tamicka Clarke; Debbie Ferguson; Christine Amertil; Shandria Brown	43.06 CR	Jamaica	43.30	Cuba; Dainelky Pérez; Roxana Díaz; Virgen Benavides; Magalys García	43.83
4 × 400 m relay	Jamaica; Naleya Downer; Michelle Burgher; Carlene Robinson; Allison Beckford	3:29.75	Grenada; Kishara George; Neisha Bernard-Thomas; Jackie-Ann Morain; Hazel-Ann Regis	3:32.99 NR	Puerto Rico ? Sandra Moya; Lizaira Del Valle; Militza Castro	3:33.35

† = non-championship event

== Medal table ==
* Host nation (Grenada)

Rank	Nation	Gold	Silver	Bronze	Total
1	Mexico (MEX)	7	4	2	13
2	Jamaica (JAM)	6	8	8	22
3	Cuba (CUB)	6	2	1	9
4	Bahamas (BAH)	5	4	2	11
5	Puerto Rico (PUR)	3	3	4	10
5	Trinidad and Tobago (TTO)	3	3	4	10
7	Grenada (GRN)*	3	3	1	7
8	Venezuela (VEN)	2	6	2	10
9	Barbados (BAR)	2	1	4	7
10	Cayman Islands (CAY)	2	0	0	2
11	Guatemala (GUA)	1	4	3	8
12	Saint Vincent and the Grenadines (VIN)	1	1	1	3
13	Bermuda (BER)	1	0	0	1
13	Saint Kitts and Nevis (SKN)	1	0	0	1
15	Haiti (HAI)	0	2	0	2
16	Nicaragua (NIC)	0	1	1	2
17	Dominican Republic (DOM)	0	1	0	1
18	Martinique (MTQ)	0	0	2	2
19	Antigua and Barbuda (ATG)	0	0	1	1
19	Guyana (GUY)	0	0	1	1
19	Netherlands Antilles (AHO)	0	0	1	1
Totals (21 entries)		43	43	38	124

== Participation ==
- Antigua and Barbuda (6)
- Aruba (2)
- Bahamas (26)
- Barbados (18)
- Bermuda (7)
- British Virgin Islands (5)
- Cayman Islands (5)
- Costa Rica (1)
- Cuba (15)
- Dominica (8)
- Dominican Republic (3)
- Grenada (27)
- Guatemala (6)
- Guyana (5)
- Haiti (4)
- Jamaica (30)
- Martinique (11)
- Mexico (19)
- Netherlands Antilles (6)
- Nicaragua (2)
- Puerto Rico (25)
- Saint Kitts and Nevis (12)
- Saint Lucia (2)
- Saint Vincent and the Grenadines (12)
- El Salvador (1)
- Trinidad and Tobago (17)
- Turks and Caicos Islands (2)
- United States Virgin Islands (12)
- Venezuela (29)
