= Maureen Stewart =

Costa Rican middle-distance runner

Personal information
- Born: 30 March 1965 San José, Costa Rica
- Died: 16 September 1994 (aged 29) Anguilla

Sport
- Sport: Middle-distance running
- Event: 800 metres

Maureen Stewart (30 March 1965 – 16 September 1994) was a Costa Rican middle-distance runner. She competed in the women's 800 metres at the 1988 Summer Olympics.

She died in Anguilla of cardiac arrest in 1994, aged 29.

Her sister, Zoila Stewart, is a retired Olympic sprinter who represented Costa Rica at the 1992 and 1996 Olympic Games.

Competing for the Rice Owls track and field team in Houston, Texas, Stewart anchored the school's 4 × 800 m relay team to an All-American finish at the 1986 NCAA Division I Indoor Track and Field Championships.
