= Elizabeth Zaragoza =

Latin American long-distance runner

Personal information
- Full name: Mary Elizabeth Zaragoza Guerrini
- Nationality: American
- Born: 7 December 1968 (age 57) San Francisco, California, U.S.
- Height: 157 cm (5 ft 2 in)
- Weight: 46 kg (101 lb)

Sport
- Sport: Long-distance running
- Event: 5000 metres

Mary Elizabeth Zaragoza Guerrini (born 7 December 1968) is an Olympian, an American elite middle distance runner of the 1990s and breast cancer survivor. She is of Mexican-Salvadoran heritage. She competed for NCAA division II San Francisco State University in the middle distance events under Olympic Gold Medalist Head Coach, Harry Marra, who recruited her from his jogging class when she was a dancer. She then went to graduate school at UCLA and competed for the Nike West team under Skip Stolley. When she graduated from UCLA, she moved to Albuquerque to train under Brian and Olga Appell. She qualified to compete in the 1995 USATF National Championships as well as the 1996 USATF Olympic Trials in the 5000 meters which were both historic first time events offered for women. During this time, she represented several USA Teams to China, Japan through the Marathon Ekiden. When she was at Stanford University, she trained with the Nike Farm Team under Jeff Johnson and Jack Daniels when she won gold in the Central American Games in the 5,000, silver in the 1500 meters and silver in the 800 meters. When her father, Salvador, died tragically she ran for El Salvador in his honor at the 2004 Summer Olympics. Years later after breast cancer, she countered the effects of chemotherapy by learning how to run the marathon under David Roche, running under 3 hours as a 50 year old. She is married to her Nike Farm teammate, Steven Guerrini. She is a neurodiversity advocate.
