= Ruben Benitez =

Salvadoran sprinter

Rubén Antonio Benítez (born 16 September 1972) is a former track and field Salvadoran sprinter athlete who competed in the men's 100m competition at the 1996 Summer Olympics. He recorded a 10.74, not enough to qualify for the next round past the heats. His personal best is 10.35, set in 1998.
