= Randolph Foster (athlete) =

Costa Rican sprinter (born 1968)

Personal information
- Full name: Randolph Olivier Foster Hutchinson
- Born: 14 August 1968 (age 58) Limón, Costa Rica

Sport
- Sport: Sprinting
- Event: 200 metres

Randolph Olivier Foster Hutchinson (born 14 August 1968) is a retired Costa Rican sprinter. He competed in the men's 200 metres at the 1992 Summer Olympics. He is the brother of Olympic hurdler Alex Foster.
