= Edgardo Antonio Serpas =

Salvadoran sprinter (born 1974)

Personal information
- Full name: Edgardo Antonio Serpas Rodas
- Nickname: Tony
- Born: 25 January 1974 (age 52) San Miguel, El Salvador
- Education: University of Southern California
- Height: 1.75 m (5 ft 9 in)
- Weight: 73 kg (161 lb)

Sport
- Sport: Sprinting
- Event: 100 metres
- College team: USC Trojans
Medal record
Representing El Salvador
Central American Games
Gold medal – first place	1997 San Pedro Sula	4x100m relay
Gold medal – first place	1997 San Pedro Sula	4x400m relay

Edgardo Antonio "Tony" Serpas Rodas (born 25 January 1974) is a Salvadoran sprinter. He competed in the men's 100 metres at the 2000 Summer Olympics, finishing sixth in his first-round heat.

Rodas was an All-American sprinter for the USC Trojans track and field team, finishing 6th in the 4 × 100 meters relay at the 1997 NCAA Division I Outdoor Track and Field Championships.
