= Orlando Mora =

Costa Rican long-distance runner

Personal information
- Full name: Luis Orlando de los Angeles Mora Padilla
- Born: 29 January 1960 (age 66) San José, Costa Rica

Sport
- Sport: Long-distance running
- Event: 5000 metres

Luis Orlando de los Angeles Mora Padilla (born 29 January 1960) is a Costa Rican long-distance runner. He competed in the men's 5000 metres at the 1984 Summer Olympics.
