= Herbert Rodríguez =

Salvadoran discus thrower

Personal information
- Full name: Herbert Mauricio Rodríguez
- Nationality: Salvadoran
- Born: 15 December 1967 (age 58)
- Height: 1.85 m (6 ft 1 in)
- Weight: 86 kg (190 lb)

Sport
- Sport: Athletics
- Event: Discus throw

Herbert Mauricio Rodríguez (born 15 December 1967) is a Salvadoran athlete. He competed in the men's discus throw at the 1992 Summer Olympics.
