= Miguel Vargas (runner) =

Costa Rican athlete

Personal information
- Full name: Miguel Ángel de la Cruz Vargas Guerrero
- Born: 8 November 1957 (age 68) San José, Costa Rica

Sport
- Sport: Long-distance running
- Event: 10,000 metres

Miguel Ángel de la Cruz Vargas Guerrero (born 8 November 1957) is a Costa Rican former long-distance runner. He competed in the men's 10,000 metres at the 1992 Summer Olympics.
