= Roberto Oscal =

Guatemalan racewalker

Personal information
- Nationality: Guatemalan
- Born: 3 July 1974 (age 52)
- Height: 1.66 m (5 ft 5 in)
- Weight: 51 kg (112 lb)

Sport
- Sport: Athletics
- Event: Racewalking

Roberto Oscal (born 3 July 1974) is a Guatemalan racewalker. He competed in the men's 20 kilometres walk at the 1996 Summer Olympics.
