= Elston Shaw =

Belizean sprinter

Personal information
- Nationality: Belizean
- Born: 16 December 1972 (age 53)
- Height: 1.82 m (6 ft 0 in)
- Weight: 67 kg (148 lb)

Sport
- Sport: Sprinting
- Event: 4 × 100 metres relay

Elston Albert Shaw (born 16 December 1972) is a Belizean track and field athlete. He competed in the men's 4 × 100 metres relay at the 1992 Summer Olympics.
