= Elizabeth Chávez =

Honduran sprinter

Personal information
- Nationality: Honduran
- Born: 20 March 1972 (age 53)

Sport
- Sport: Sprinting
- Event: 100 metres

Elizabeth Chávez (born 20 March 1972), also known as Pastora Chávez, is a Honduran sprinter. She competed in the women's 100 metres at the 1996 Summer Olympics.
