= Alex Foster (athlete) =

Costa Rican hurdler

Personal information
- Full name: Alex Anthony Foster Hutchinson
- Born: 8 May 1970 (age 56) Limón, Costa Rica
- Height: 1.90 m (6 ft 3 in)
- Weight: 79 kg (174 lb)

Sport
- Country: Costa Rica
- Sport: Hurdling

Achievements and titles
- Personal best: 51.94

Alex Anthony Foster Hutchinson is a Costa Rican Olympic hurdler. He represented his country in the men's 400 metres hurdles at the 1992 Summer Olympics. His time was a 52.93 in the hurdles. He is the brother of Olympic sprinter Randolph Foster.
