= Eduardo Enrique Reina =

Honduran politician (born 1968)

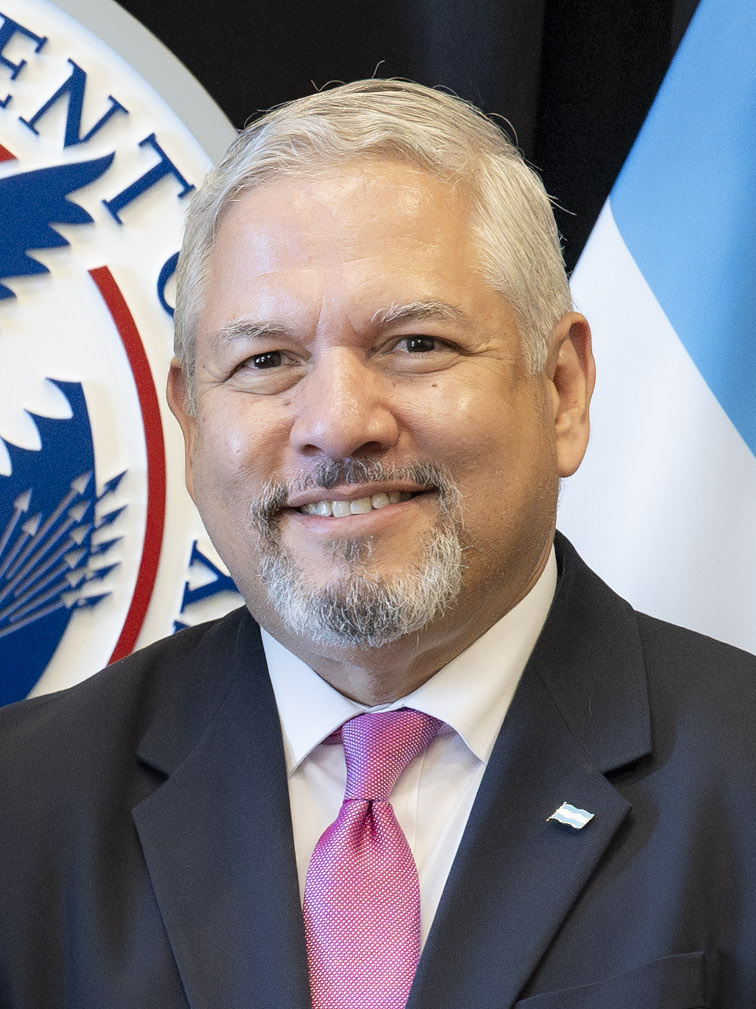
- Reina in 2025

Minister of Foreign Affairs
- In office 27 January 2022 – 27 May 2024
- President: Xiomara Castro
- Preceded by: Lisandro Rosales
- Succeeded by: Javier Efraín Bu

Personal details
- Born: 9 December 1968 (age 57) Tegucigalpa, Honduras
- Party: Liberty and Refoundation

Eduardo Enrique Reina García (born 9 December 1968) is a Honduran politician who served as Minister of Foreign Affairs from January 2022 until his resignation in May 2024. A member of the Liberty and Refoundation party, he was Rixi Moncada's running mate in the 2025 general election.
