= Ivis Martínez =

Salvadoran racewalker (born 1971)

Ivis Haydee Martínez
Personal information
- Nationality: Salvadoran
- Born: 5 January 1971 (age 55)
- Height: 1.55 m (5 ft 1 in)
- Weight: 54 kg (119 lb)

Sport
- Sport: Athletics
- Event: Racewalking

Ivis Haydee Martínez (born 5 January 1971) is a Salvadoran racewalker. She competed in the women's 20 kilometres walk at the 2000 Summer Olympics, where she finished in the 34th position.
