= Rolando Blanco =

Guatemalan sprinter

Personal information
- Nationality: Guatemalan
- Born: 29 December 1972 (age 53)
- Height: 1.70 m (5 ft 7 in)
- Weight: 62 kg (137 lb)

Sport
- Sport: Sprinting
- Event: 100 metres

Rolando Mario Blanco Noldero (born 29 December 1972) is a Guatemalan sprinter. He competed in the men's 4 × 100 metres relay at the 2000 Summer Olympics.
