= José Tinoco =

Guatemalan sprinter

Personal information
- Full name: José Luis Tinoco Kipps
- Nationality: Guatemalan
- Born: 6 July 1974 (age 52)
- Height: 1.78 m (5 ft 10 in)
- Weight: 71 kg (157 lb)

Sport
- Sport: Sprinting
- Event: 100 metres

José Luis Tinoco Kipps (born 6 July 1974) is a Guatemalan sprinter. He competed in the men's 4 × 100 metres relay at the 2000 Summer Olympics.
