= Arely Franco =

Salvadoran sprinter (born 1968)

Personal information
- Full name: Arely Franco Ramos
- Born: 30 July 1968 (age 57) San Salvador, El Salvador
- Education: Universidad Nacional de El Salvador
- Height: 1.70 m (5 ft 7 in)
- Weight: 59 kg (130 lb)

Sport
- Sport: Sprinting
- Event: 400 metres

Arely Franco Ramos (born 30 July 1968) is a Salvadoran sprinter. She competed in the women's 400 metres at the 1996 Summer Olympics.
