= Volleyball at the Central American Games =

Volleyball has been in the Central American Games event since the first inaugural edition in 1973 in Guatemala City, Guatemala. Since then the volleyball competitions for both men and women have been present in all editions except the 2006 Central American Games.

== Indoor Volleyball ==
=== Men's tournaments ===
==== Summaries ====
Year	Host	Final			Third-place game		
Year	Host	Gold Medal	Score	Silver Medal	Bronze Medal	Score	Fourth Place
1973; Details	Guatemala City	Panama		Guatemala	El Salvador		Costa Rica
1977; Details	(El Salvador); San Salvador	Guatemala		Panama	Costa Rica		El Salvador
1986; Details	Guatemala City	Guatemala		Costa Rica	Nicaragua		Honduras
1990; Details	(Honduras); Tegucigalpa	Costa Rica		Nicaragua	Honduras		Guatemala
1994; Details	(El Salvador); San Salvador	Panama		Honduras	Costa Rica		El Salvador
1997; Details	(Honduras); San Pedro Sula	Guatemala		Honduras	Belize		Costa Rica
2001; Details	Guatemala City	Costa Rica		Honduras	El Salvador		Guatemala
No volleyball event was held in the 2006 Central American Games.
2010; Details	Panama City	Panama		Costa Rica	Honduras		El Salvador
2013; Details	(Costa Rica); San José	Honduras	3–2	Costa Rica	Panama	3–1	Guatemala
2017; Details	(Nicaragua); Managua	Guatemala	Round-robin	El Salvador	Honduras	Round-robin	Costa Rica
The 2022 Central American Games were canceled.
2025; Details	Guatemala City	Costa Rica	3–1	Nicaragua	Panama	3–2	Belize

=== Medal summary ===
Rank	Nation	Gold	Silver	Bronze	Total
1	Guatemala	4	1	0	5
2	Costa Rica	3	3	2	8
3	Panama	3	1	2	6
4	Honduras	1	3	3	7
5	Nicaragua	0	2	1	3
6	El Salvador	0	1	2	3
7	Belize	0	0	1	1
Totals (7 entries)		11	11	11	33

=== Women's tournaments ===
==== Summaries ====
Year	Host	Final			Third-place game		
Year	Host	Champion	Score	Second Place	Third Place	Score	Fourth Place
1973; Details	Guatemala City	Panama		Guatemala	Costa Rica		Nicaragua
1977; Details	(El Salvador); San Salvador	Costa Rica		Panama	El Salvador		Nicaragua
1986; Details	Guatemala City	Costa Rica		Nicaragua	Guatemala		Honduras
1990; Details	(Honduras); Tegucigalpa	Costa Rica		Honduras	Guatemala		Nicaragua
1994; Details	(El Salvador); San Salvador	Costa Rica		Nicaragua	Panama		Honduras
1997; Details	(Honduras); San Pedro Sula	Honduras		Costa Rica	Nicaragua		Guatemala
2001; Details	Guatemala City	Costa Rica		Guatemala	Nicaragua		Honduras
No volleyball event was held in the 2006 Central American Games.
2010; Details	Panama City	Costa Rica		Nicaragua	Panama		El Salvador
2013; Details	(Costa Rica); San José	Costa Rica	3–1	Guatemala	Nicaragua	3–0	El Salvador
2017; Details	(Nicaragua); Managua	Costa Rica	Round-robin	Nicaragua	Guatemala	Round-robin	Honduras
The 2022 Central American Games were canceled.
2025; Details	Guatemala City	Costa Rica	3–0	Nicaragua	Belize	3–1	Guatemala

=== Medal summary ===
Rank	Nation	Gold	Silver	Bronze	Total
1	Costa Rica	9	1	1	11
2	Panama	1	1	2	4
3	Honduras	1	1	0	2
4	Nicaragua	0	5	3	8
5	Guatemala	0	3	3	6
6	Belize	0	0	1	1
6	El Salvador	0	0	1	1
Totals (7 entries)		11	11	11	33
