= Athletics at the Central American Games =

Athletics competitions have been held at the quadrennial Central American Games and open to member federations of the Central American Sports Organization (Spanish: Organización Deportiva Centroamericana or ORDECA) since the inaugural edition of 1973 in Ciudad de Guatemala, Guatemala. The 1981 games were cancelled due to political instability. In 2006 the athletics events were not contested by Costa Rica, El Salvador or Panama. In 2010, Guatemala did not participate.

== Editions ==
| Games | Year | Host city | Country | Events | |
| Games | Year | Host city | Country | Men | Women |
|---|---|---|---|---|---|
| I | 1973 | Ciudad de Guatemala | Guatemala | 24 | 14 |
| II | 1977 | San Salvador | El Salvador | 23 | 14 |
| III | 1986 | Ciudad de Guatemala | Guatemala | 24 | 16 |
| IV | 1990 | Tegucigalpa | Honduras | 24 | 19 |
| V | 1994 | San Salvador | El Salvador | 24 | 21 |
| VI | 1997 | San Pedro Sula | Honduras | 24 | 22 |
| VII | 2001 | Ciudad de Guatemala | Guatemala | 22 | 21 |
| VIII | 2006 | Managua | Nicaragua | 21 | 15 |
| IX | 2010 | Ciudad de Panamá | Panama | 20 | 19 |
| X | 2013 | San José | Costa Rica | 20 | 21 |
| XI | 2017 | Managua | Nicaragua | 24 | 23 |
| XII | 2025 | Quetzaltenango | Guatemala | 18 | 19 |

== Medals ==
Gold medal winners for the athletics events of the Central American Games were published.

== See also ==
List of Central American Games records in athletics
