= Jaime Comandari =

Salvadoran athlete

Personal information
- Full name: Jaime Gerardo Comandari Zanotti
- Born: 28 December 1965 (age 60)

Sport
- Sport: Athletics
- Events: Shot put, discus throw
Medal record
Representing El Salvador
Central American Games
Gold medal – first place	1994 San Salvador	Shot put
Gold medal – first place	1997 San Pedro Sula	Shot put
Silver medal – second place	1986 Guatemala City	Shot put
Silver medal – second place	1990 Tegucigalpa	Shot put
Silver medal – second place	1997 San Pedro Sula	Discus throw
Silver medal – second place	2001 Guatemala City	Shot put
Bronze medal – third place	1994 San Salvador	Discus throw

Jaime Gerardo Comandari Zanotti (born 28 December 1965) is a retired Salvadoran athlete who specialised in the shot put. He represented his country at the 1993 World Championships without qualifying for the final.

His personal best is 16.31 metres outdoors (Maracaibo 1998) and 15.54 indoors (Gainesville 1988).

== International competitions ==
Year	Competition	Venue	Position	Event	Notes
Representing El Salvador
1984	Central American Championships	Guatemala City, Guatemala	8th	Shot put	11.99 m
1984	Central American Championships	Guatemala City, Guatemala	5th	Discus throw	38.18 m
1986	Central American Games	Guatemala City, Guatemala	2nd	Shot put	
1986	World Junior Championships	Athens, Greece	19th (q)	Shot put	12.78 m
1986	World Junior Championships	Athens, Greece	31st (q)	Discus throw	37.14 m
1987	Pan American Games	Indianapolis, United States	8th	Shot put	13.79 m
1988	Ibero-American Championships	Manaus, Brazil	9th	Shot put	13.61 m
1990	Central American Games	Tegucigalpa, Honduras	2nd	Shot put	
1990	Central American and Caribbean Games	Mexico City, Mexico	6th	Shot put	15.06 m
1991	Central American Championships	Tegucigalpa, Honduras	1st	Shot put	14.17 m
1991	Central American Championships	Tegucigalpa, Honduras	2nd	Discus throw	38.40 m
1991	Central American and Caribbean Championships	Xalapa, Mexico	3rd	Shot put	14.80 m
1992	Ibero-American Championships	Seville, Spain	9th	Shot put	14.96 m
1993	Universiade	Buffalo, United States	15th (q)	Shot put	15.25 m
1993	World Championships	Stuttgart, Germany	31st (q)	Shot put	14.97 m
1994	Central American Games	San Salvador, El Salvador	1st	Shot put	15.37 m
1994	Central American Games	San Salvador, El Salvador	3rd	Discus throw	
1995	Pan American Games	Mar del Plata, Argentina	7th	Shot put	15.21 m
1997	Central American and Caribbean Championships	San Juan, Puerto Rico	4th	Shot put	16.19 m
1997	Central American Games	San Pedro Sula, Honduras	1st	Shot put	15.88 m
1997	Central American Games	San Pedro Sula, Honduras	2nd	Discus throw	40.70 m
1998	Ibero-American Championships	Lisbon, Portugal	11th	Shot put	16.05 m
1998	Central American and Caribbean Games	Maracaibo, Venezuela	6th	Shot put	16.31 m
1999	Central American and Caribbean Championships	Bridgetown, Barbados	3rd	Shot put	15.99 m
2001	Central American Games	Guatemala City, Guatemala	2nd	Shot put	15.65 m
