= Luis Martínez (runner) =

Guatemalan long-distance runner (born 1966)

Personal information
- Full name: Luis Estuardo Martínez Perez
- Nationality: Guatemalan
- Born: 19 November 1966
- Died: 31 January 2022 (aged 55)
- Height: 1.65 m (5 ft 5 in)
- Weight: 54 kg (119 lb)

Sport
- Sport: Long-distance running
- Event: Marathon
Medal record
Representing Guatemala
Central American Games
Gold medal – first place	1990 Tegucigalpa	800m
Gold medal – first place	1990 Tegucigalpa	1500m
Gold medal – first place	1994 San Salvador	800m
Gold medal – first place	1997 San Pedro Sula	Marathon
Bronze medal – third place	1994 San Salvador	1500m

Luis Estuardo Martínez Perez (19 November 1966 – 31 January 2022) was a Guatemalan middle- and long-distance runner. He competed in the men's marathon at the 1996 Summer Olympics.

== International competitions ==
Year	Competition	Venue	Position	Event	Notes
Representing Guatemala
1987	Universiade	Zagreb, Yugoslavia	4th (h)	800 m	1:51.47
1987	Universiade	Zagreb, Yugoslavia	26th (h)	1500 m	3:52.28
1988	Ibero-American Championships	Mexico City, Mexico	9th (h)	800 m	1:54.06
1988	Ibero-American Championships	Mexico City, Mexico	6th	1500 m	4:04.29
1989	Central American and Caribbean Championships	San Juan, Puerto Rico		1500 m	3:44.44
1989	Universiade	Duisburg, West Germany	32nd (h)	800 m	1:54.76
1989	Universiade	Duisburg, West Germany	27th (h)	1500 m	3:57.99
1990	Central American Games	Tegucigalpa, Honduras	1st	800 m	1:51.0
1990	Central American Games	Tegucigalpa, Honduras	1st	1500 m	3:52.8
1990	Central American and Caribbean Games	Mexico City, Mexico	5th	800 m	1:51.68
1990	Central American and Caribbean Games	Mexico City, Mexico	4th	1500 m	3:51.55
1991	Central American Championships	Tegucigalpa, Honduras	1st	800 m	1:51.52
1991	Central American Championships	Tegucigalpa, Honduras	1st	1500 m	3:53.79
1991	World Championships	Tokyo, Japan	29th (h)	800 m	1:49.07
1991	World Championships	Tokyo, Japan	33rd (h)	1500 m	3:46.39
1992	Ibero-American Championships	Seville, Spain	15th (h)	800 m	1:53.11
1992	Ibero-American Championships	Seville, Spain	7th	1500 m	3:50.13
1993	Central American and Caribbean Games	Ponce, Puerto Rico	5th	1500 m	3:47.68
1993	Central American and Caribbean Games	Ponce, Puerto Rico	5th	3000 m s'chase	9:08.76
1994	Central American Games	San Salvador, El Salvador	3rd	800 m	
1994	Central American Games	San Salvador, El Salvador	1st	1500 m	3:52.05
1995	Pan American Games	Mar del Plata, Argentina	8th	Marathon	2:18:11
1996	Olympic Games	Atlanta, United States	82th	Marathon	2:29:55
1997	World Championships	Athens, Greece	50th	Marathon	2:31:11
1997	Central American Games	San Pedro Sula, Honduras	1st	Marathon	2:48:32
1998	Central American and Caribbean Games	Maracaibo, Venezuela	7th	Marathon	2:39:14

== Personal bests ==
Outdoor

- 800 metres – 1:49.07 (Tokyo 1991)
- 1500 metres – 3:44.44 (San Juan 1989) former NR
- Marathon – 2:29:55 (Atlanta 1996)
