= Luis Flores (triple jumper) =

Honduran athlete

Personal information
- Full name: Luis Daniel Flores Ancel
- Nationality: Honduran
- Born: 27 October 1967 (age 59)

Sport
- Sport: Athletics
- Events: Triple jump, long jump
Medal record
Men's athletics
Representing Honduras
Central American Games
Silver medal – second place	2001 Guatemala City	Triple jump
Bronze medal – third place	1994 San Salvador	High jump

Luis Daniel Flores Ancel (born 27 October 1967) is a Honduran triple jumper and high jumper. He competed in the men's triple jump at the 1992 Summer Olympics though failed to make it to the finals. After the Summer Games, he gained success at the Central American Games, winning one bronze and one silver medal. After his sports career, he was the general secretary of the Honduran National Athletics Federation.

== Biography ==
Luis Daniel Flores Ancel was born on 27 October 1967. As an athlete, he competed for Honduras in international competition.

Flores was selected to compete for Honduras at the 1992 Summer Olympics held in Barcelona, Spain. At the 1992 Summer Games, he was entered in one event, the men's triple jump. He competed in Group B of the qualifiers against 22 other triple jumpers. There, he jumped his longest attempt at 15.08 metres for his first, 13.88 metres for his second, and 14.52 metres for his third. Overall, he placed 21st in his group and did not qualify for the finals of the event. After the 1992 Summer Games, he instead competed in the men's high jump. He competed at the 1994 Central American Games held in San Salvador, El Salvador, representing Honduras in the men's high jump. There, he won the bronze medal in the event with a clearance of 1.93 metres.

He later went back to the triple jump and competed at the 2001 Central American Games held in Guatemala City, Guatemala. There, he won the silver medal in the event with a distance of 14.85 metres. After his sports career, he was active in sports administration roles. As of April 2025, he was the general secretary of the Honduran National Athletics Federation.
