= Ángel Díaz (athlete) =

Guatemalan track and field athlete

Personal information
- Born: October 29, 1961 (age 64)

Sport
- Sport: Track and field
Medal record
Representing Guatemala
Central American Games
Gold medal – first place	1986 Guatemala City	Decathlon
Gold medal – first place	1990 Tegucigalpa	Decathlon
Silver medal – second place	1986 Guatemala City	110m hurdles

Ángel Estuardo Díaz Granillo (born October 29, 1961) is a Guatemalan track and field athlete, specializing in the combined events of the decathlon. He competed in the 1984 Olympics. He also competed at the 1983 World Championships.

Díaz is a civil engineer in Guatemala. He continues to participate in Masters athletics. On May 29, 2017, Diaz broke the currently ratified M55 masters world record in the decathlon scoring 8,031 points to beat American William Murray's score from the Masters Athletics World Championships in 2009. German Rolf Geese still holds a superior mark from 1999, recognized by the European Masters Athletics, but not World Masters Athletics. Geese, now in the M70 division was also competing in the same meet at Stendal.
