= Vilma Peña =

Costa Rican long-distance runner

Personal information
- Full name: Vilma de Jesús Peña Sánchez
- Born: 28 March 1960 (age 66) Cartago, Costa Rica
- Height: 1.62 m (5 ft 4 in)
- Weight: 49 kg (108 lb)

Sport
- Sport: Long-distance running
- Event: Marathon
Medal record
Representing Costa Rica
Central American and Caribbean Games
Bronze medal – third place	1990 Mexico City	3000m
Bronze medal – third place	1990 Mexico City	10,000m
Central American Games
Gold medal – first place	1990 Tegucigalpa	3000m
Gold medal – first place	1990 Tegucigalpa	10,000m
Silver medal – second place	1990 Tegucigalpa	1500m

Vilma de Jesús Peña Sánchez (born 28 March 1960) is a Costa Rican former long-distance runner. She competed in the women's marathon at the 1992 Summer Olympics.
