= Athletics at the 1993 Summer Universiade – Men's shot put =

The men's shot put event at the 1993 Summer Universiade was held at the UB Stadium in Buffalo, United States on 15 and 16 July 1993.

== Medalists ==
Gold	Silver	Bronze
Aleksandr Klimenko; Ukraine	Paolo Dal Soglio; Italy	Chris Volgenau; United States

== Results ==
=== Qualification ===
Rank	Group	Athlete	Nationality	Result	Notes
1	?	Aleksandr Klimenko	Ukraine	19.09	
2	?	Liu Hao	China	18.69	
3	?	Chris Volgenau	United States	18.54	
4	?	Courtney Ireland	New Zealand	18.28	
5	?	Paolo Dal Soglio	Italy	18.14	
6	?	Thorsten Herbrand	Germany	18.03	
7	?	Kevin Coleman	United States	17.73	
8	?	Miroslav Menc	Czech Republic	17.59	
9	?	Carel le Roux	South Africa	17.57	
10	?	Corrado Fantini	Italy	17.33	
11	?	Mihalis Louka	Cyprus	17.28	
12	?	Chen Hsin-yuh	Chinese Taipei	17.12	
13	?	Manjit Singh	India	15.92	
14	?	Lu Ching-yi	Chinese Taipei	15.74	
15	?	Jaime Comandari	El Salvador	15.25	
16	?	Vicente Navarro	Spain	15.07	
17	?	Elias Guerra	Peru	13.07	
18	?	Rachid El-Khouri	Lebanon	10.87	

=== Final ===
Rank	Athlete	Nationality	Result	Notes
1st place, gold medalist(s)	Aleksandr Klimenko	Ukraine	19.72	
2nd place, silver medalist(s)	Paolo Dal Soglio	Italy	19.64	
3rd place, bronze medalist(s)	Chris Volgenau	United States	19.54	
4	Courtney Ireland	New Zealand	19.20	
5	Liu Hao	China	19.17	
6	Kevin Coleman	United States	18.54	
7	Corrado Fantini	Italy	18.53	
8	Miroslav Menc	Czech Republic	18.45	
9	Carel le Roux	South Africa	18.34	
10	Mihalis Louka	Cyprus	16.64	
11	Chen Hsin-yuh	Chinese Taipei	15.81	
12	Thorsten Herbrand	Germany	15.14	
