= Cycling at the 2023 Central American and Caribbean Games – Qualification =

The following is the qualification system for the 2023 Central American and Caribbean Games competition.

== Qualification system ==
A total of 250 (125 men and 125 women) cyclists will qualify to compete. 180 will qualify in road/track, 40 in mountain biking and 30 in BMX. Various events and rankings were used to determine the qualifiers. A nation could enter a maximum of 28 athletes, four in mountain biking (two per gender), four in BMX (three per gender) and a combined 20 for road and track (ten men and ten women). El Salvador as host nation, was automatically awarded the maximum quota of 28 spots.

Event	Men	Women	Total
BMX	15	15	30
Mountain Biking	20	20	40
Road	58	58	116
Track	32	32	64
Total athletes	125	125	250

== Qualification timeline ==
Event	Date	Venue
BMX
2022 Centroamerican Championship	March 13, 2022	(Costa Rica) San José
UCI Individual Ranking	December 31, 2022	–
Mountain Bike
2022 Pan American Championship	May 25 – 29, 2022	(Argentina) Catamarca
2022 Caribbean Championship	September 10–11, 2022	(Dominican Republic) Santiago de los Caballeros
2022 Centroamerican Championship	November 12 – 13, 2022	(Honduras) Tegucigalpa
Track
2022 Pan American Championship	August 10 – 14, 2022	(Peru) Lima
~~2022 Central American Games~~	~~November 4 – December 19, 2022~~	~~Guatemala City~~
2022 Caribbean Championship	November 12 – 13, 2022	(Trinidad and Tobago) Couva
Road
2022 Pan American Championship	May 11–15, 2022	(Argentina) San Juan
2022 Caribbean Championship	October 21–23, 2022	(Dominican Republic) Santo Domingo
2022 Centroamerican Championship	October 14–16, 2022	(Costa Rica) San José

== Qualification summary ==
A total of 26 countries qualified cyclists after reallocation. The qualification charts below do not represent qualified countries after reallocation. Two additional quotas were assigned for unknown reasons.

Nation	BMX		Mountain		Road		Track		Total		
Nation	Men	Women	Men	Women	Men	Women	Men	Women	Men	Women	Total
Aruba		2	1						1	2	3
Barbados							1	1	1	1	2
Belize					1	1			1	1	2
Bermuda					1	2			1	2	3
Colombia	2	2	2	2	4	4	6	4	14	12	26
Costa Rica	2	2	2	2	1	3			5	7	12
Centro Caribe Sports	2	2	2	2	4			~~2~~	8	~~6~~ 4	~~14~~ 12
Cuba				1	2	4	6	6	8	10	19
Dominican Republic			2	2	2	1			4	3	7
Grenada					2				3		2
Honduras			2	2	1	1			3	3	6
Jamaica							3	2	3	2	5
El Salvador	2	2	2	2	4	4	6	6	14	14	28
Mexico	2		1	2			6	6	9	8	17
Nicaragua						1				1	1
Panama					3	3			3	3	6
Puerto Rico	2		2	2	2	2			6	4	10
Suriname							2		2		2
Trinidad and Tobago						1	4	3	4	4	8
Venezuela	2		1	1	4	4	2	3	9	8	17
Total: 26 NOCs	14	10	17	18	31	31	36	31	99	90	188

== BMX ==
=== Racing ===
A maximum of 15 male and 15 female athletes will be allowed to compete in BMX racing. The host nation (El Salvador) automatically receives the maximum of two quota spots per event, and all other nations may qualify a maximum of two athletes per event. All qualification will be done using the UCI rankings as of December 31, 2022.

==== Men ====
Event	No. of cyclist	NOC
Host nation	2	El Salvador
UCI World Rankings	2	Colombia
UCI World Rankings	2	Venezuela
UCI World Rankings	2	Costa Rica
UCI World Rankings	2	Puerto Rico
UCI World Rankings	2	Centro Caribe Sports
UCI World Rankings	2	Mexico
UCI World Rankings	~~1~~	Vacant
Total	15	Total NOC's: 7

==== Women ====
Event	No. of cyclist	NOC
Host nation	2	El Salvador
UCI World Rankings	2	Colombia
UCI World Rankings	2	Aruba
UCI World Rankings	2	Costa Rica
UCI World Rankings	2	Centro Caribe Sports
UCI World Rankings	~~2~~	Vacant
UCI World Rankings	~~2~~	Vacant
UCI World Rankings	~~1~~	Vacant
Total	~~15~~ 10	Total NOC's: 5

== Mountain biking ==
A maximum of 20 male and 20 female athletes will be allowed to compete in mountain biking. The host nation (El Salvador) automatically receives the maximum two quota spot per event, and all other nations may qualify a maximum of two athletes per event. Qualification was done across three tournaments.

=== Men ===
Event	No. of cyclist	NOC
Host nation	2	El Salvador
2022 Pan American Championship	2	Colombia
2022 Pan American Championship	1	Mexico
2022 Pan American Championship	1	Costa Rica
2022 Pan American Championship	1	Puerto Rico
2022 Pan American Championship	1	Venezuela
2022 Centroamerican Championship	2	Honduras
2022 Centroamerican Championship	1	Costa Rica
2022 Centroamerican Championship	2	Centro Caribe Sports
2022 Centroamerican Championship	~~1~~	Vacant
2022 Caribbean Championship	1	Puerto Rico
2022 Caribbean Championship	2	Dominican Republic
2022 Caribbean Championship	1	Aruba
2022 Caribbean Championship	~~1~~	Vacant
2022 Caribbean Championship	~~1~~	Vacant
Total	~~20~~ 17	Total NOC's: 10

=== Women ===
Event	No. of cyclist	NOC
Host nation	2	El Salvador
2022 Pan American Championship	2	Mexico
2022 Pan American Championship	2	Colombia
2022 Pan American Championship	1	Dominican Republic
2022 Pan American Championship	1	Venezuela
2022 Centroamerican Championship	2	Costa Rica
2022 Centroamerican Championship	2	Centro Caribe Sports
2022 Centroamerican Championship	2	Honduras
2022 Caribbean Championship	1	Dominican Republic
2022 Caribbean Championship	2	Puerto Rico
2022 Caribbean Championship	1	Cuba
2022 Caribbean Championship	~~1~~	Vacant
2022 Caribbean Championship	~~1~~	Vacant
Total	~~20~~ 18	Total NOC's: 10

== Track cycling ==
=== Men's team sprint ===
Event	No. of cyclist	NOC
Host nation	3	El Salvador
2022 Pan American Championship	3	Trinidad and Tobago
2022 Pan American Championship	3	Mexico
2022 Pan American Championship	3	Colombia
2022 Caribbean Championship	3	Cuba
2022 Central American Games	~~3~~	Cancelled
Total	~~18~~ 15	Total NOC's: 5

=== Men's sprint ===
Event	No. of cyclist	NOC
Host nation	2	El Salvador
2022 Pan American Championship	2	Trinidad and Tobago
2022 Pan American Championship	2	Mexico
2022 Pan American Championship	2	Colombia
2022 Pan American Championship	1	Suriname
2022 Caribbean Championship	2	Cuba
2022 Caribbean Championship	1	Jamaica
2022 Central American Games	~~2~~	Cancelled
2022 Central American Games	~~1~~	Cancelled
Total	~~15~~ 12	Total NOC's: 7

* Qualified as a continental representative

=== Men's Keirin ===
Event	No. of cyclist	NOC
Host nation	2	El Salvador
2022 Pan American Championship	2	Trinidad and Tobago
2022 Pan American Championship	2	Mexico
2022 Pan American Championship	2	Colombia
2022 Pan American Championship	1	Suriname
2022 Caribbean Championship	2	Cuba
2022 Caribbean Championship	1	Jamaica
2022 Central American Games	~~2~~	Cancelled
2022 Central American Games	~~1~~	Cancelled
Total	~~15~~ 12	Total NOC's: 7

=== Men's team pursuit ===
Event	No. of cyclist	NOC
Host nation	3	El Salvador
2022 Pan American Championship	3	Venezuela
2022 Pan American Championship	3	Mexico
2022 Pan American Championship	3	Colombia
2022 Caribbean Championship	3	Cuba
2022 Central American Games	~~3~~	Cancelled
Total	~~18~~ 15	Total NOC's: 5

=== Men's Madison ===
Event	No. of cyclist	NOC
Host nation	2	El Salvador
2022 Pan American Championship	2	Mexico
2022 Pan American Championship	2	Colombia
2022 Caribbean Championship	2	Cuba
2022 Central American Games	~~2~~	Cancelled
Total	~~10~~ 8	Total NOC's: 4

=== Men's Omnium ===
Event	No. of cyclist	NOC
Host nation	2	El Salvador
2022 Pan American Championship	2	Venezuela
2022 Pan American Championship	2	Mexico
2022 Pan American Championship	2	Colombia
2022 Pan American Championship	1	Trinidad and Tobago
2022 Pan American Championship	1	Barbados
2022 Caribbean Championship	2	Cuba
2022 Caribbean Championship	1	Jamaica
2022 Central American Games	~~2~~	Cancelled
2022 Central American Games	~~1~~	Cancelled
Total	~~16~~ 13	Total NOC's: 8

* Qualified as a continental representative

=== Women's team sprint ===
Event	No. of cyclist	NOC
Host nation	3	El Salvador
2022 Pan American Championship	3	Cuba
2022 Pan American Championship	3	Mexico
2022 Pan American Championship	3	Colombia
2022 Caribbean Championship	3	Trinidad and Tobago
2022 Central American Games	~~3~~	Cancelled
Total	~~18~~ 12	Total NOC's: 5

=== Women's sprint ===
Event	No. of cyclist	NOC
Host nation	2	El Salvador
2022 Pan American Championship	2	Cuba
2022 Pan American Championship	2	Mexico
2022 Pan American Championship	2	Colombia
2022 Pan American Championship	~~1~~ ^{(Doping)}	~~Centro Caribe Sports~~
2022 Pan American Championship	~~1~~	Vacant
2022 Caribbean Championship	2	Trinidad and Tobago
2022 Caribbean Championship	1	Jamaica
2022 Central American Games	~~2~~	Cancelled
2022 Central American Games	~~1~~	Cancelled
Total	~~16~~ 11	Total NOC's: 6

* Qualified as a continental representative

=== Women's Keirin ===
Event	No. of cyclist	NOC
Host nation	2	El Salvador
2022 Pan American Championship	2	Cuba
2022 Pan American Championship	2	Mexico
2022 Pan American Championship	2	Colombia
2022 Pan American Championship	~~1~~ ^{(Doping)}	~~Centro Caribe Sports~~
2022 Pan American Championship	~~1~~	Vacant
2022 Caribbean Championship	2	Trinidad and Tobago
2022 Caribbean Championship	1	Jamaica
2022 Central American Games	~~2~~	Cancelled
2022 Central American Games	~~1~~	Cancelled
Total	~~16~~ 11	Total NOC's: 6

=== Women's team pursuit ===
Event	No. of cyclist	NOC
Host nation	3	El Salvador
2022 Pan American Championship	3	Venezuela
2022 Pan American Championship	3	Mexico
2022 Pan American Championship	~~3~~ ^{(Ranking Close)}	~~Colombia~~
2022 Caribbean Championship	3	Cuba
2022 Central American Games	~~3~~	Cancelled
Total	~~18~~ 12	Total NOC's: 4

=== Women's Madison ===
Event	No. of cyclist	NOC
Host nation	2	El Salvador
2022 Pan American Championship	2	Venezuela
2022 Pan American Championship	2	Mexico
2022 Caribbean Championship	2	Cuba
2022 Central American Games	~~2~~	Cancelled
Total	~~10~~ 8	Total NOC's: 4

=== Women's Omnium ===
Event	No. of cyclist	NOC
Host nation	2	El Salvador
2022 Pan American Championship	2	Venezuela
2022 Pan American Championship	2	Mexico
2022 Pan American Championship	~~2~~ ^{(Ranking Close)}	~~Colombia~~
2022 Pan American Championship	1	Barbados
2022 Pan American Championship	1	Colombia
2022 Caribbean Championship	2	Cuba
2022 Caribbean Championship	1	Trinidad and Tobago
2022 Central American Games	~~2~~	Cancelled
2022 Central American Games	~~1~~	Cancelled
Total	~~16~~ 11	Total NOC's: 6

== Road events ==
=== Men's road race ===
Event	No. of cyclist	NOC
Host nation	3	El Salvador
2022 Panamerican Championship	3	Venezuela
2022 Panamerican Championship	3	Colombia
2022 Panamerican Championship	1	Panama
2022 Panamerican Championship	1	Puerto Rico
2022 Panamerican Championship	1	Grenada
2022 Centroamerican Championship	3	Centro Caribe Sports
2022 Centroamerican Championship	1	Panama
2022 Centroamerican Championship	1	Honduras
2022 Caribbean Championship	2	Dominican Republic
2022 Caribbean Championship	2	Cuba
2022 Caribbean Championship	1	Belize
2022 Caribbean Championship	1	Puerto Rico
Total	23	Total NOC's: 11

=== Men's individual time trial ===
Event	No. of cyclist	NOC
Host nation	1	El Salvador
2022 Panamerican Championship	1	Venezuela
2022 Panamerican Championship	1	Colombia
2022 Panamerican Championship	1	Guatemala
2022 Centro American Championship	1	Panama
2022 Centro American Championship	1	Costa Rica
2022 Caribbean Championship	1	Bermuda
2022 Caribbean Championship	1	Grenada
Total	8	Total NOC's: 8

=== Women's road race ===
Event	No. of cyclist	NOC
Host nation	3	El Salvador
2022 Panamerican Championship	3	Venezuela
2022 Panamerican Championship	3	Colombia
2022 Panamerican Championship	1	Panama
2022 Panamerican Championship	1	Puerto Rico
2022 Panamerican Championship	1	Cuba
2022 Centroamerican Championship	2	Costa Rica
2022 Centroamerican Championship	1	Panama
2022 Centroamerican Championship	1	Honduras
2022 Centroamerican Championship	1	Nicaragua
2022 Caribbean Championship	2	Cuba
2022 Caribbean Championship	1	Bermuda
2022 Caribbean Championship	1	Dominican Republic
2022 Caribbean Championship	1	Belize
2022 Caribbean Championship	1	Puerto Rico
Total	23	Total NOC's: 12

=== Women's individual time trial ===
Event	No. of cyclist	NOC
Host nation	1	El Salvador
2022 Panamerican Championship	1	Venezuela
2022 Panamerican Championship	1	Colombia
2022 Panamerican Championship	1	Cuba
2022 Centro American Championship	1	Panama
2022 Centro American Championship	1	Costa Rica
2022 Caribbean Championship	1	Bermuda
2022 Caribbean Championship	1	Trinidad and Tobago
Total	8	Total NOC's: 8
