= Athletics at the 1990 Central American Games =

Athletics at the IV Central American Games
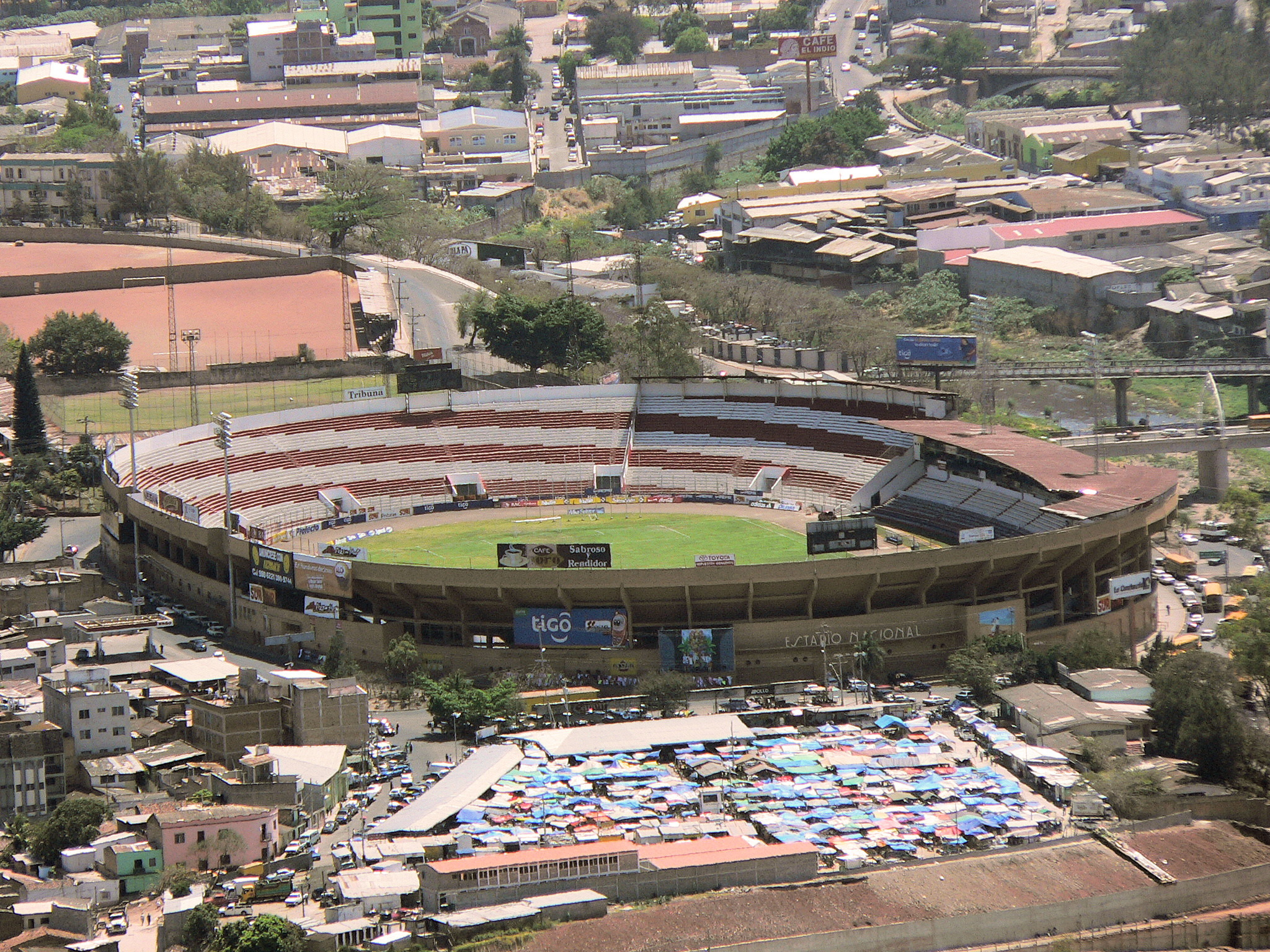
- The national stadium of Honduras in Tegucigalpa (Estadio Nacional de Tegucigalpa) also known as Estadio Tiburcio Carías Andino.
- Dates: January
- Host city: Tegucigalpa, Honduras
- Venue: Estadio Tiburcio Carías Andino
- Level: Senior
- Events: 43 (24 men, 19 women)

Athletics competitions at the 1990 Central American Games were held at the Estadio Tiburcio Carías Andino in Tegucigalpa, Honduras, in January, 1990.

A total of 43 events were contested, 24 by men and 19 by women.

== Medal summary ==
Gold medal winners and their results were published. A complete list of medal winners can be found on the MásGoles webpage (click on "JUEGOS CENTROAMERICANOS" in the low right corner). Gold medalists were also published in other sources.

=== Men ===
Event	Gold		Silver	Bronze
100 metres	Giovanni Flores (HON)	11.4	Mario Blanco (GUA)	Enrique Rodríguez (CRC)
200 metres	Giovanni Flores (HON)	21.4	Felipe Ballesteros (HON)	Mario Blanco (GUA)
400 metres	Giovanni Flores (HON)	47.5	Frank Almendárez (NCA)	Erick Krings (GUA)
800 metres	Luis Martínez (GUA)	1:51.0	Roger Miranda (NCA)	Carlos Mairena (NCA)
1500 metres	Luis Martínez (GUA)	3:52.8	Roger Miranda (NCA)	Lázaro Vásquez (GUA)
5000 metres	Miguel Vargas (CRC)	14:33.5	Antonio Morales (GUA)	Hugo Allan García (GUA)
10,000 metres	Miguel Vargas (CRC)	30:50.0	Eliécer López (CRC)	Hugo Allan García (GUA)
Marathon	William Aguirre (NCA)	2:30:39	Luis López (CRC)	Salomón López (GUA)
3000 metres steeplechase	Alberto Paredes (GUA)	9:25.5	Hugo Allan García (GUA)	Carlos Medina (HON)
110 metres hurdles	Ángel Díaz (GUA)	15.2	Alex Foster (CRC)	Mauricio Carranza (ESA)
400 metres hurdles	Erick Krings (GUA)	52.8	Frank Almendárez (NCA)	Mauricio Carranza (ESA)
4 x 100 metres relay	Costa Rica; Laverne Thompson; Henry Daley; Michael Pearson; Enrique Rodríguez	42.5	Guatemala; Antonio Montepeque; Victor Porras; Ángel Díaz; Mario Blanco	Nicaragua; Roger Romero; Nelson Navarro Miranda; José Alfredo Ortiz; José Jesús Acosta
4 x 400 metres relay	Nicaragua; Alejandro Lara; Roger Miranda; Frank Almendárez	3:18.4	Costa Rica; Javier Allen; Carlos Madrigal; Enrique Rodríguez; Laverne Thompson	Honduras; Carlos Idiáquez; Ramón Castillo; Javier Guitty; Giovanni Flores
20 Kilometres Road Walk	Luis Canelo (NCA)	1:30:56	Víctor Alonso (GUA)	José León (ESA)
50 Kilometres Road Walk	Nelson Fúnez (GUA)	4:31:08	Jorge Casco (HON)	Walter Estrada (GUA)
High jump	Fernando Rodríguez (CRC)	2.00	Miguel Monge (CRC)	Rudel Franco (ESA)
Pole vault	Antonio Montepeque (GUA)	4.20	Lucas Miranda (ESA)	Héctor Salvatierra (GUA)
Long jump	Angelo Iannuzzelli (ESA)	7.20	Vance Parks (CRC)	Nelson Navarro (NCA)
Triple jump	Alejandro Lara (NCA)	14.67	Vance Parks (CRC)	Mauricio Carranza (ESA)
Shot put	Fernando Alonzo (GUA)	15.13	Jaime Comandari (ESA)	Guadalupe Urbina (NCA)
Discus throw	Herbert Rodríguez (ESA)	43.98	Fernando Alonzo (GUA)	Gilberth Delgadillo (NCA)
Hammer throw	Víctor Taracena (GUA)	50.42	Simón Kafie (ESA)	Enrique Reina (HON)
Javelin throw	Rigoberto Calderón (NCA)	64.84	Roberto Jiménez (NCA)	Juan Galdámez (ESA)
Decathlon	Ángel Díaz (GUA)	6575	Lucas Miranda (ESA)	Douglas Gutiérrez (NCA)

=== Women ===
Event	Gold		Silver	Bronze
100 metres	Zoila Stewart (CRC)	12.3	Wilder Dixon (NCA)	Leticia Osorto (ESA)
200 metres	Zoila Stewart (CRC)	25.1	Sigrid Gutiérrez (CRC)	Wilder Dixon (NCA)
400 metres	Zoila Stewart (CRC)	55.8	Bernice Gálvez (BIZ)	Leticia Jiménez (GUA)
800 metres	Leticia Jiménez (GUA)	2:16.0	Cristina Girón (GUA)	Shirley Céspedes (CRC)
1500 metres	Aura Morales (GUA)	4:44.3	Vilma Peña (CRC)	Cristina Girón (GUA)
3000 metres	Vilma Peña (CRC)	10:18.0	Aura Morales (GUA)	Azucena Galindo (GUA)
10,000 metres	Vilma Peña (CRC)	37:28.4	María Menéndez (GUA)	María Ocón (NCA)
Marathon	Gina Coello (HON)	3:13:10	María Ocón (NCA)	Elsa Citán (GUA)
100 metres hurdles	Ivonne White (CRC)	15.4	Ana Quiñónez (GUA)	Larissa Soto (GUA)
400 metres hurdles	Leticia Jiménez (GUA)	63.2	Magdalena Molina (CRC)	Virginia Boesche (GUA)
4 x 100 metres relay	Costa Rica; Halette Channer; Sigrid Gutiérrez; Magdalena Molina; Zoila Stewart	48.5	El Salvador; Sonora Valiente; Leticia Osorto; Patricia Hasbun; Mayra Romero	Guatemala; Ana Quiñónez; Marta Madriz; Genevieve Bethancourt; Larissa Soto
4 x 400 metres relay	Costa Rica; Zoila Stewart; Magdalena Molina; Sigrid Gutiérrez; Shirley Céspedes	3:54.8	El Salvador; Patricia Hasbun; Mayra Romero; Leticia Osorto; Arely Franco	Nicaragua; Martha Portobanco; Carolina Argüello; Xiomara Larios; Ivone López
10,000 metres Track Walk	Magdalena Guzmán (ESA)	60:49.3	Doris Vallecillo (HON)	Rachel Cruz (HON)
High jump	Ana Quiñónez (GUA)	1.71	Lilian Green (NCA)	Ivonne White (CRC)
Long jump	Ivonne White (CRC)	5.36	Larissa Soto (GUA)	Halette Channer (CRC)
Shot put	María Lourdes Ruiz (NCA)	12.32	Damaris Ulloa (NCA)	Glendorle Pinnock (CRC)
Discus throw	María Lourdes Ruiz (NCA)	44.66	Marta Centeno (GUA)	Lisbeth Matzford (GUA)
Javelin throw	Patricia Chamorro (NCA)	41.16*	Sayra Martínez (HON)	Marta Centeno (GUA)
Heptathlon	Larissa Soto (GUA)	3873	Ana Talavera (NCA)	Sandra Valiente (ESA)

== Notes ==
^{*}: Original model javelin.

== Medal table (unofficial) ==
* Host nation ( Honduras)

Rank	Nation	Gold	Silver	Bronze	Total
1	Guatemala	15	12	17	44
2	Costa Rica	13	10	5	28
3	Nicaragua	8	10	9	27
4	Honduras*	4	4	4	12
5	El Salvador	3	6	8	17
6	Belize	0	1	0	1
Totals (6 entries)		43	43	43	129
