= Whitbeck =

Whitbeck may refer to:

- Whitbeck, Cumbria, a village in Cumbria, England

== People with the surname ==
- Harris Whitbeck (born 1965), CNN's International Correspondent based in Mexico City, Mexico
- Harris Whitbeck Sr. (1933-2019), Guatemalan businessman
- John Whitbeck (active 2011-), American attorney and political official
