= Estadio Jorge "El Mágico" González =

Stadium in San Salvador

Coordinates: 13.698298°N 89.215426°W

Estadio Nacional Jorge "El Mágico" González
- Estadio "El Mágico"

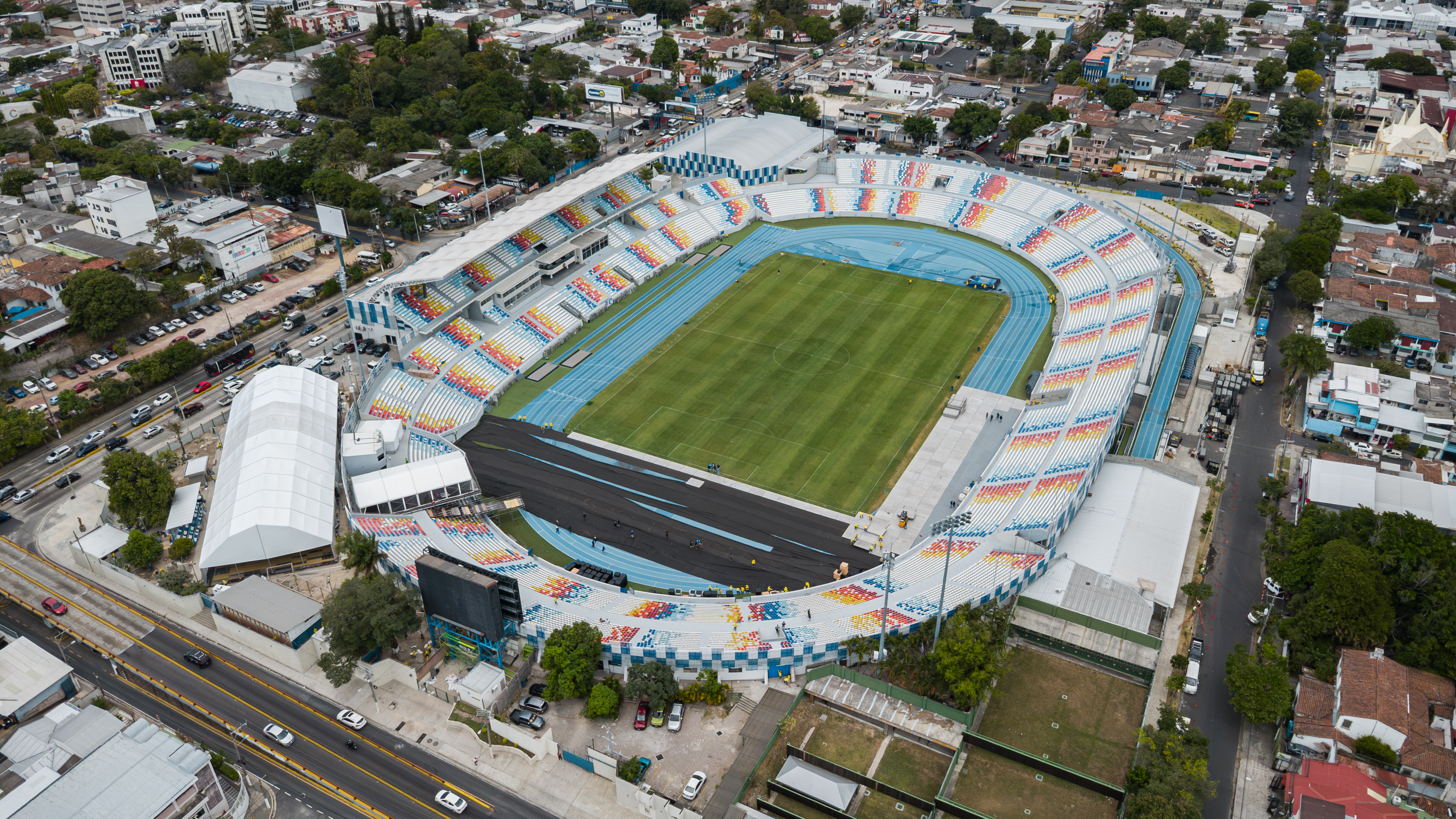
- The stadium in 2026
- Interactive map of Estadio Nacional; Jorge "El Mágico" González
- Full name: Estadio Nacional Jorge "Mágico" González
- Former names: Estadio Nacional Flor Blanca (1935–2006)
- Location: San Salvador, El Salvador
- Owner: Government of El Salvador
- Operator: National Institute of Sports
- Capacity: 30,000
- Surface: Bermuda grass
- Field size: 105 m × 70 m (344 ft × 230 ft)

Construction
- Groundbreaking: 23 October 1933
- Built: 19 February 1935
- Opened: 16 March 1935
- Renovated: 2023
- Expanded: 1960, 2000, 2002, 2023

Tenants
- El Salvador national football team (1932–1976, 2023–present); C.D. Atlético Marte (1950–2001); Alianza F.C. (1960–2001, 2013, 2014); Santa Tecla F.C. (2012)

Estadio Nacional Jorge "El Mágico" González is a football stadium in San Salvador. It is named after Salvadoran star player Mágico González. The stadium has a capacity of 30,000 and was previously known as "Estadio Nacional Flor Blanca", referring to the name of the San Salvador neighborhood where it is located.

The stadium was restored in 2001 to host notable sporting events in Latin America, the Central American and Caribbean Games in August 2002.

== History ==
The Estadio Nacional was constructed in 1932 by President Maximiliano Hernández Martínez for the 1935 Central American and Caribbean Games. The name Flor Blanca was named after the location of the stadium (49 North Avenue, Colonia Flor Blanca, San Salvador).

In 2002, as part of the 70th anniversary of its construction and organization of the 2002 Central American and Caribbean Games, it would hold the largest renovation in its history, where it doubled its initial capacity, and was fully modernized. The renovation includes the installation of 20,000 seats for the convenience of the spectators and track facilities for more modern and the installation of functional Tartan Central, where they have made the most important athletic competition of the Isthmus.

In 2006, 74 years after its construction, the government of President Antonio Saca, decided to change its name to Estadio Nacional Jorge "Mágico" González, after the footballer in El Salvador.

In 2010, the stadium was used for the eleventh season of the Dutch TV-show Wie is de Mol?

== 2021 Renovations Plan ==
In September 2021, It was announced by the National Institute of Sports of El Salvador (INDES) that it agreed a 22 million dollar loan with the Central American Bank for Economic Integration (CABEI) to complete a renovation. The renovation will include the development of new stands, a new pitch, athletics track, irrigation system, lighting and drainage, as well as improved access for people with disabilities. They will also build a museum dedicated to González will form part of the renovation project. The project is expected to be completed in September 2023.

== Important events ==
- 1935 Central American and Caribbean Games
- 1963 CONCACAF Championship
- 1977 Central American Games
- 1994 Central American Games
- 2002 Central American and Caribbean Games
- 2003 Maná Revolución de Amor Tour
- 2006 Shakira Oral Fixation Tour
- 2016 Iron Maiden the book of souls world tour
- 2018–19 Copa El Salvador Final
- 2023 Central American and Caribbean Games
- 2026 Shakira Las Mujeres Ya No Lloran World Tour
- 2026 Iron Maiden Run for Your Lives World Tour

== Gallery ==
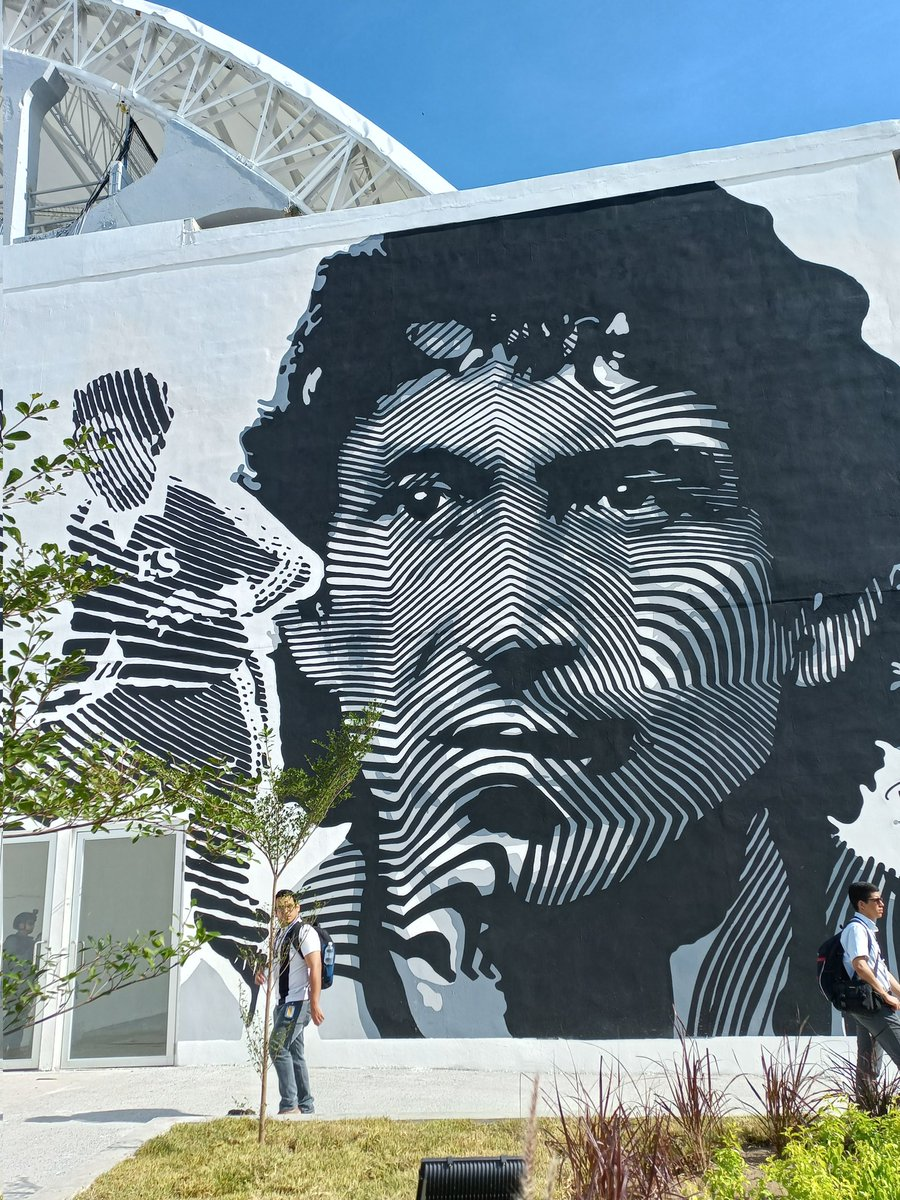
Mural of Magico Gonzalez outside the stadium in 2025

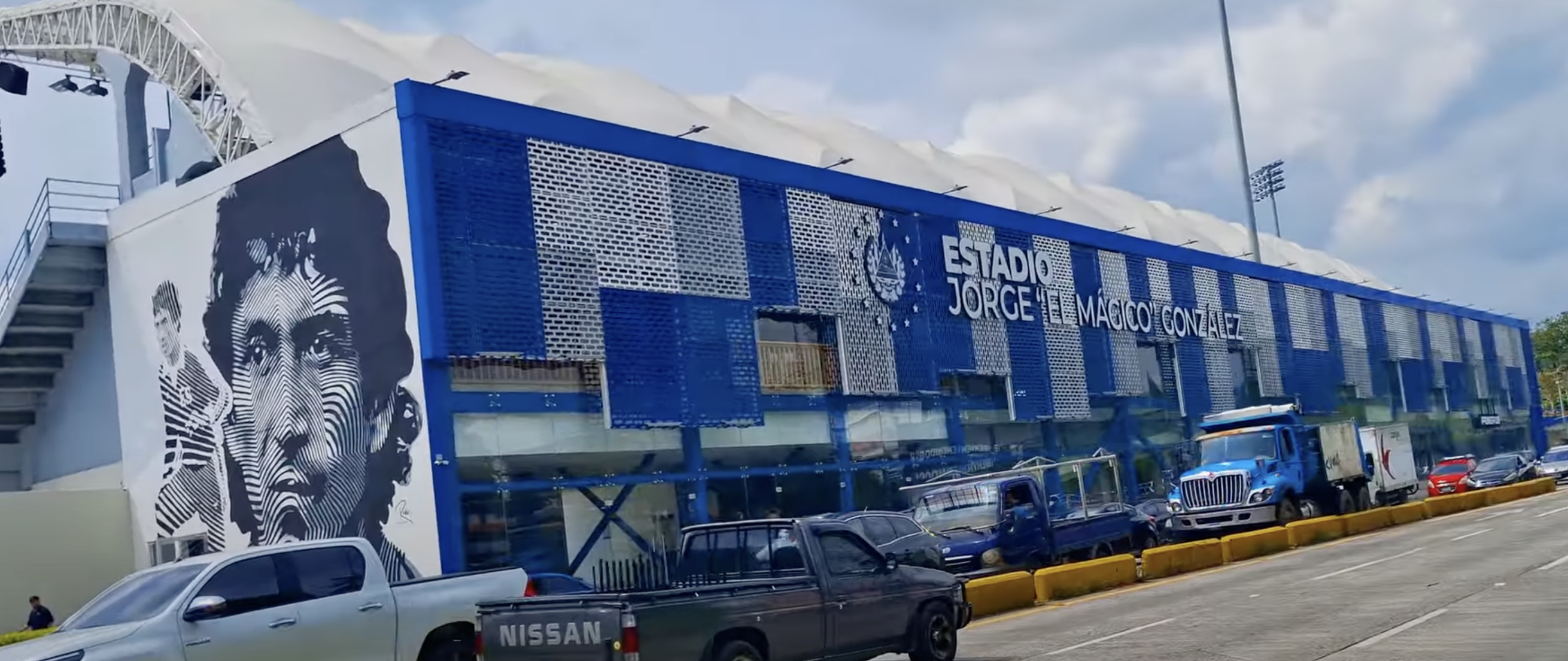
Street view of the stadium

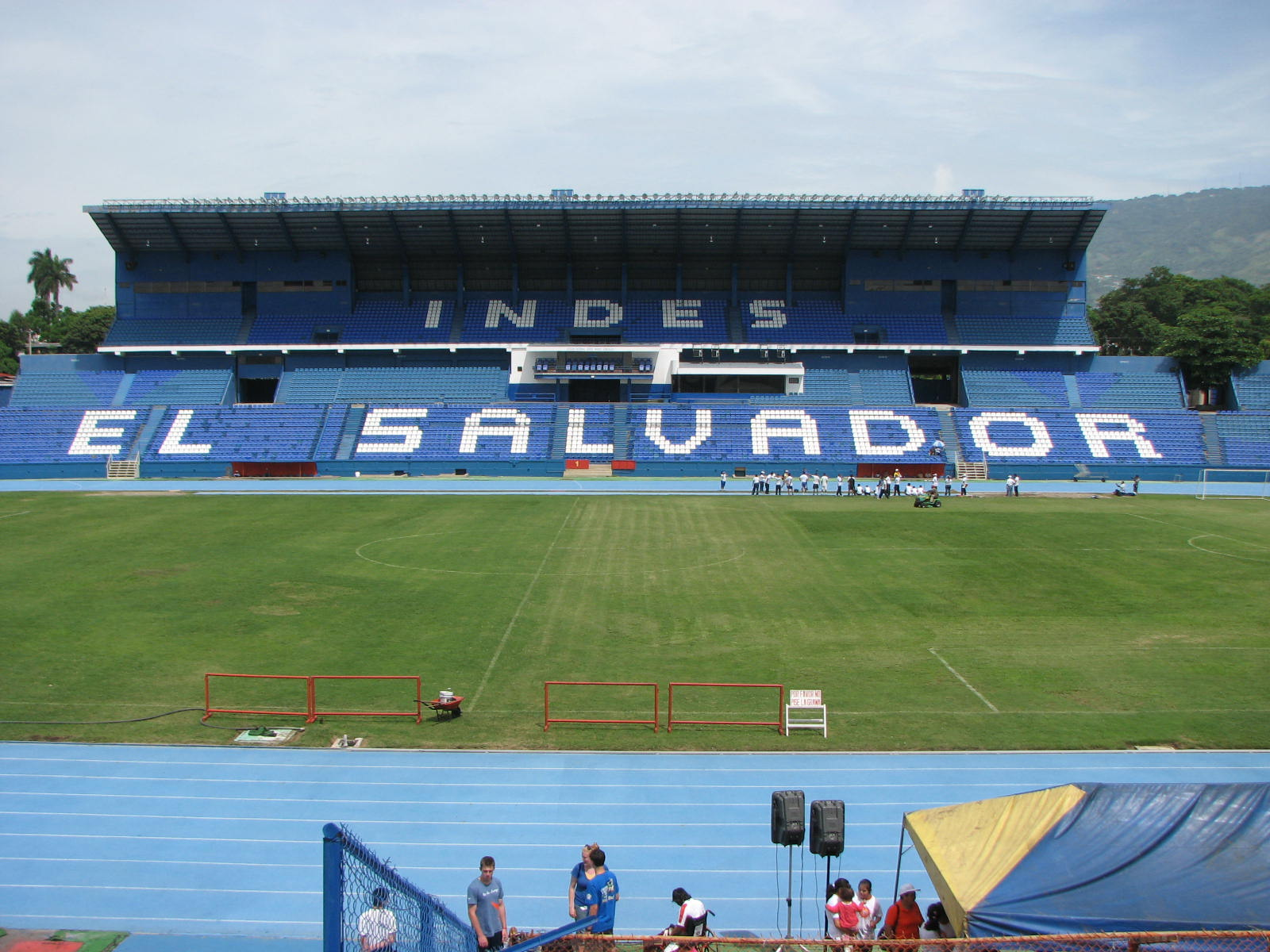
Stadium before the renovations in 2011

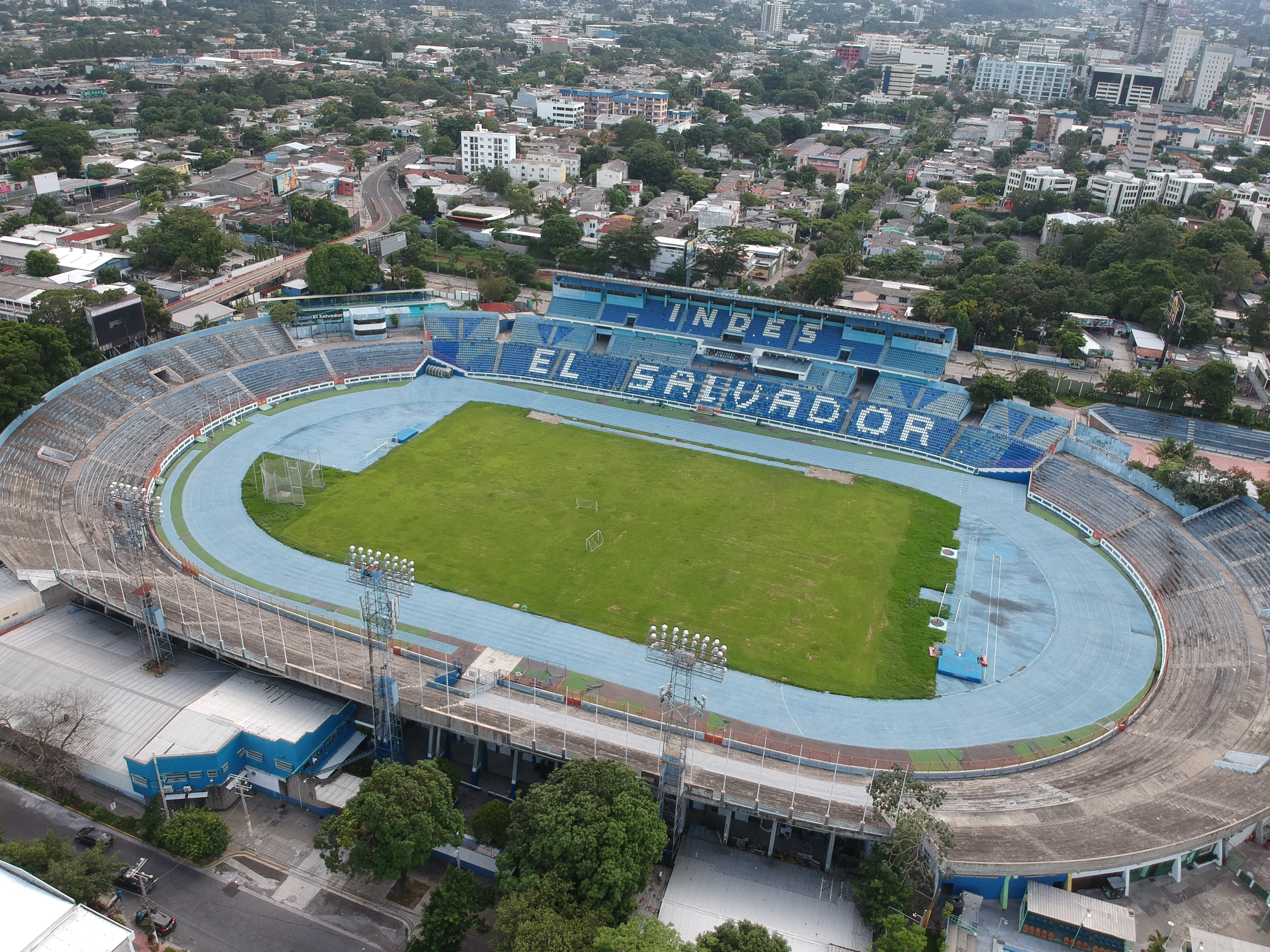
Stadium before the renovations in 2020

Events and tenants
Preceded by La Tropical; Havana	Central American and Caribbean Games; Opening and closing ceremonies venue 1935	Succeeded by Estadio Olímpico Nacional; Panama City
Preceded by None	CONCACAF Championship; Final Venue; 1963	Succeeded by Estadio Mateo Flores; Guatemala City
Preceded by Estadio Mateo Flores; Guatemala City	Central American Games; Opening and closing ceremonies venue 1977	Succeeded by Estadio Mateo Flores; Guatemala City
Preceded by Estadio Tiburcio Carías Andino; Tegucigalpa	Central American Games; Opening and closing ceremonies venue 1994	Succeeded by Estadio Olímpico Metropolitano; San Pedro Sula
Preceded by Estadio José Encarnación Romero; Maracaibo	Central American and Caribbean Games; Opening and closing ceremonies venue 2002	Succeeded by Estadio Pedro de Heredia; Cartagena
Preceded by Estadio Cuscatlán; San Salvador	Copa El Salvador; Final Venue; 2019	Succeeded by TBD
Preceded by Estadio Metropolitano Roberto Meléndez; Barranquilla	Central American and Caribbean Games; Opening and closing ceremonies venue 2023	Succeeded by TBD
