= Athletics at the 2001 Central American Games =

Athletics at the VII Central American Games
- Dates: November 30 - December 3
- Host city: Guatemala City, Guatemala
- Venue: Estadio La Pedrera
- Level: Senior
- Events: 43 (22 men, 21 women)
- Participation: 6 nations

Athletics competitions at the 2001 Central American Games were held at the Estadio La Pedrera in Guatemala City, Guatemala, between November 30 - December 3, 2001.

A total of 43 events were contested, 22 by men and 21 by women.

== Medal summary ==
Gold medal winners were published. Furthermore, results were compiled from various press archives, especially from La Prensa Libre, Guatemala. Moreover, athletics at the VII Central American Games is covered by La Nación, San José, Costa Rica, El Diario de Hoy, San Salvador, El Salvador, El Nuevo Diario, Managua, Nicaragua, and La Prensa, Panamá. A complete list of medal winners can be found on the MásGoles webpage (click on "JUEGOS CENTROAMERICANOS" in the low right corner).

=== Men ===
Event	Gold		Silver		Bronze	
100 metres	Bob Colville (CRC)	10.54 A	Edgardo Serpas (ESA)	10.73 A	Rubén Benítez (ESA)	10.73 A
200 metres	Rolando Blanco (GUA)	21.17 A	Joseph Colville (CRC)	21.21 A	Álvaro James (CRC)	21.46 A
400 metres	Álvaro James (CRC)	46.83 A	Joseph Colville (CRC)	47.81 A	Félix González (ESA)	49.43 A
800 metres	César Arias (ESA)	1:56.82 A	Jefry Pérez (CRC)	1.57:28 A	Octavio Herrera (NCA)	1.57:65 A
1500 metres	Jefry Pérez (CRC)	3:59.68 A	Kenneth Otarola (CRC)	4:00.70 A	Carlos Allen (GUA)	4:00.90 A
5000 metres	José Amado García (GUA)	14:28.91 A	Francisco Gómez Vega (CRC)	14:31.47 A	Ronald Arias (ESA)	15:58.00 A
10,000 metres	Francisco Gómez Vega (CRC)	30:30.91 A	José Amado García (GUA)	30:43.86 A	Ronald Blandón (NCA)	34:30.91 A
Marathon	Rafael Yax (GUA)	2:29:12 A	Juan Ramos (GUA)	2:32:28 A	Ronald Torres (CRC)	2:37:39 A
110 metres hurdles	Jefry Pacheco (GUA)	14.55 A GR	Roberto Cortez (ESA)	15.26 A	David Umaña (CRC)	15.74 A
400 metres hurdles	Roberto Cortez (ESA)	52.51 A GR	David Umaña (CRC)	56.73 A	Emilio Morales (NCA)	57.54 A
3000 metres steeplechase	Francisco Gómez Vega (CRC)	9:12.83 A	Erick Bonilla (ESA)	9:29.90 A	Selvin Molineros (GUA)	9:44.03 A
4 x 100 metres relay	Costa Rica; Bob Colville; Joseph Colville; Alvaro James; Víctor Cantillano	40.57 A GR	Guatemala; Jorge Solórzano; Rolando Blanco; José Tinoco; Isaí Cruz	40.59 A	El Salvador; Alejandro Navarro; Rubén Benítez; Julio Cesar Roque; Edgardo Serpas	40.77 A
4 x 400 metres relay	El Salvador; Alejandro Navarro; Roberto Cortez; César Arias; Edgardo Serpas	3:15.71 A GR	Guatemala; Rolando Blanco; Carlos Morales; Arisk Perdomo; Jefry Pacheco	3:23.25	Belize; Newton García; Víctor Martín; Simón Castillo; Jayson Jones	3:35.67
20 Kilometres Road Walk	Luis García (GUA)	1:27:52 A	Julio Martínez (GUA)	1:27:53 A	Allan Segura (CRC)	1:33:54 A
High jump	Alton Berry (BIZ)	1.95 A	Tulio Quiroz (HON)	1.92 A	Joel Wade (BIZ)	1.89 A
Pole vault	Jorge Solórzano (GUA)	4.60 A GR	Oscar Hernández (ESA)	4.40	Pedro Fuentes (ESA)	4.30
Long jump	Angelo Iannuzzelli (ESA)	7.17 A	Julio González (CRC)	7.11 A	Guillermo Uclés (HON)	6.77 A
Triple jump	Álvaro Paiz (GUA)	14.94 A	Luis Flores (HON)	14.85 A	Guillermo Uclés (HON)	14.29 A
Shot put	Edson Monzón (GUA)	15.79 A	Jaime Comandari (ESA)	15.65 A	Henry Santos (GUA)	14.96 A
Discus throw	Herbert Rodríguez (ESA)	48.06 A GR	Nelson Chavarría (CRC)	45.41 A	Raúl Rivera (GUA)	43.43 A
Hammer throw	Raúl Rivera (GUA)	61.83 A GR	Guillermo Morales (ESA)	50.90 A	Nelson Chavarría (CRC)	49.66 A
Javelin throw	Rigoberto Calderón (NCA)	68.69 A	Javier Ugarte (NCA)	62.28 A	André Bounurant (GUA)	58.62 A

=== Women ===
Event	Gold		Silver		Bronze	
100 metres	Gabriela Patterson (CRC)	11.92 A GR	María José Paiz (GUA)	12.21 A	Tricia Flores (BIZ)	12.33 A
200 metres	Gabriela Patterson (CRC)	24.21 A GR	Karla Hernández (ESA)	25.33 A	Maritza Figueroa (NCA)	25.64 A
400 metres	Verónica Quijano (ESA)	54.72 A GR	Ana Lucía Hurtado (GUA)	56.27 A	Karla Hernández (ESA)	56.97 A
800 metres	Gabriela Quezada (ESA)	2:09.68 A GR	Ana Lucía Hurtado (GUA)	2:12.03 A	Rosa Évora (ESA)	2:15.79 A
1500 metres	Elsa Monterroso (GUA)	4:34.55 A GR	Gabriela Traña (CRC)	4:37.13 A	Gabriela Quezada (ESA)	4:44.88 A
5000 metres	Elsa Monterroso (GUA)	17:19.10 A GR	María Hidalgo (ESA)	18:13.15 A	Gabriela Traña (CRC)	18:25.57 A
10,000 metres	Elsa Monterroso (GUA)	36:07.26 A GR	María Hidalgo (ESA)	38:07.74 A	Herlinda Xol (GUA)	38:33.26 A
Marathon	Kriscia García (ESA)	3:02:25 A GR	Magda Castillo (HON)	3:07.05 A	Margarita Conde (GUA)	3:15.25 A
100 metres hurdles	Verónica Quijano (ESA)	14.64 A	Alejandra Bolaños (CRC)	15.69 A	Kamesha Yorke (BIZ)	16.63 A
400 metres hurdles	Verónica Quijano (ESA)	59.20 A GR	Alejandra Bolaños (CRC)	66.81 A	Kamesha Yorke (BIZ)	67.52 A
4 x 100 metres relay	El Salvador; Marcela Navarro; Verónica Quijano; Karla Hernández; Aura Amaya	46.93 A GR	Guatemala; Sandra Oliveros; Sabrina Asturias; María José Paiz; Ana Lucía Hurtado	48.23 A	Belize; Gina Lovell; Tricia Flores; Candice Blades; Jackieva Castillo	48.34 A
4 x 400 metres relay	El Salvador; Karla Hernández; Verónica Quijano; Cesia Rodríguez; Gabriela Quezada	3:49.71 A GR	Guatemala; Ana Lucía Hurtado; Rosana Rodríguez; Sandra Oliveros; Patrizia Valenzuela	3:55.55 A	Costa Rica; Gabriela Patterson; Mónica Campos; Alejandra Bolaños; Gabriela Traña	4:04.89 A
20 Kilometres Road Walk	Teresita Collado (GUA)	1:40:29 A GR	Ivis Martínez (ESA)	1:45:49 A	Cristina López (ESA)	1:49:01 A
High jump	Ana Quiñónez (GUA)	1.70 A	Meryann Roesch (GUA)	1.64 A	Gabriela Cuéllar (ESA)	1.64 A
Pole vault	Michelle Rivera (ESA)	3.40 A GR	Denise Jerez (GUA)	3.10 A	Brenda Aguilar (HON)	2.50 A
Long jump	María José Paiz (GUA)	5.66 A	Sabrina Asturias (GUA)	5.65 A	Tricia Flores (BIZ)	5.38 A
Triple jump	María José Paiz (GUA)	12.21 A GR	Gabriela Carrillo (ESA)	11.52 A	Peggy Ovalle (GUA)	11.35 A
Shot put	Eva María Dimas (ESA)	13.28 A GR	Sandra Valiente (ESA)	11.64 A	Ana Lucía Espinoza (GUA)	11.38 A
Discus throw	Ana Lucía Espinoza (GUA)	48.25 A GR	Eva María Dimas (ESA)	47.45 A	María Lourdes Ruiz (NCA)	37.67 A
Hammer throw	Nancy Guillén (ESA)	55.99 A GR	Ana Lucía Espinoza (GUA)	49.75 A	Rosita de León (GUA)	42.21 A
Javelin throw	Dalila Rugama (NCA)	44.16 A	Karen Villafuerte (ESA)	44.05 A	Aida Figueroa (GUA)	35.94 A

== Medal table (unofficial) ==
* Host nation (Guatemala)

Rank	Nation	Gold	Silver	Bronze	Total
1	Guatemala*	17	14	11	42
2	El Salvador	15	14	10	39
3	Costa Rica	8	11	7	26
4	Nicaragua	2	1	5	8
5	Belize	1	0	7	8
6	Honduras	0	3	3	6
Totals (6 entries)		43	43	43	129
