= Hockey5s at the 2025 Central American Games =

Tournament details
- Host country: Guatemala
- City: Guatemala City
- Dates: 17 – 21 October 2025
- Teams: 6 (from 1 confederation)
- Venue: Centro Deportivo Campo Marte

Final positions
- Champions: M : Costa Rica; W : Guatemala

The hockey5s tournament at the 2025 Central American Games was held from 17 to 21 October 2025. The men's and women's tournaments were held simultaneously at the Centro Deportivo Campo Marte in Guatemala City.

== Medalists ==
Event	Gold	Silver	Bronze
Men's tournament	Costa Rica	Guatemala	El Salvador
Women's tournament	Guatemala	Costa Rica	El Salvador

== Men's tournament ==
=== Preliminary round ===
Pos	Team	Pld	W	D	L	GF	GA	GD	Pts	Qualification
1	Guatemala (H)	5	4	0	1	25	6	+19	12	Gold-medal Match
2	Costa Rica	5	3	2	0	23	7	+16	11	Gold-medal Match
3	El Salvador	5	3	1	1	20	9	+11	10	Bronze-medal Match
4	Panama	5	2	1	2	14	10	+4	7	Bronze-medal Match
5	Nicaragua	5	1	0	4	7	20	−13	3	5th place Match
6	Honduras	5	0	0	5	2	39	−37	0	5th place Match

Source: FIH
Rules for classification: 1) points; 2) matches won; 3) goal difference; 4) goals for; 5) head-to-head result; 6) field goals for.
(H) Hosts

17 October 2025
08:00

Guatemala	3–1	Nicaragua
Villatoro 7'; Depaz 26'; Calderón 30+'	Report	Campos 13'

Umpires:
Andrey Umana (CRC)
Jose Anzueto (GUA)

17 October 2025
09:00

Panama	6–0	Honduras
Rodriguez 4'; Gordon 6'; Villanueva 9'; Suira 13'; Flores 20'; Miranda 20'	Report

Umpires:
Rodwel Borrayo (GUA)
Carlos Jimenez (GUA)

17 October 2025
12:00

Costa Rica	2–2	El Salvador
Picado 12', 14'	Report	Alvarez 3', 20'

Umpires:
Rodwel Borrayo (GUA)
Galo Gonzalez (CRC)

17 October 2025
14:00

Guatemala	12–0	Honduras
Palma 5', 12'; Villatoro 7', 19'; Cardona 8', 16', 18', 19'; Méndez 8', 17'; Leiva 10'; Calderón 14'	Report

Umpires:
Andrey Umana (CRC)
Nathaniel Fuentes (PAN)

18 October 2025
08:00

Panama	1–3	El Salvador
	Report

Umpires:
Rodwel Borrayo (GUA)
Andrey Umana (CRC)

18 October 2025
09:00

Nicaragua	0–4	Costa Rica
	Report

Umpires:
Nathaniel Fuentes (PAN)
Jose Anzueto (GUA)

18 October 2025
12:00

Nicaragua	0–5	Panama
	Report

Umpires:
Rodwel Borrayo (GUA)
Galo Gonzalez (CRC)

18 October 2025
13:00

El Salvador	7–0	Honduras
	Report

Umpires:
Nathaniel Fuentes (PAN)
Carlos Jimenez (GUA)

19 October 2025
08:00

Costa Rica	4–2	Guatemala
	Report

19 October 2025
10:00

El Salvador	7–3	Nicaragua
	Report

19 October 2025
12:00

Honduras	1–11	Costa Rica
	Report

19 October 2025
14:00

Panama	0–5	Guatemala
	Report

20 October 2025
10:00

Honduras	1–3	Nicaragua
	Report

20 October 2025
12:00

Costa Rica	2–2	Panama
	Report

20 October 2025
14:00

Guatemala	3–1	El Salvador
	Report

=== Medal round ===
==== 5th place Match ====
21 October 2025
10:00

Nicaragua	3–0	Honduras
	Report

Umpires:
Rodwel Borrayo (GUA)
Galo Gonzalez (CRC)

==== Bronze medal Match ====
21 October 2025
12:00

El Salvador	3–2	Panama
	Report

Umpires:
Andrey Umana (CRC)
Jose Anzueto (GUA)

==== Gold medal match ====
21 October 2025
14:00

Guatemala	1–5	Costa Rica
	Report

Umpires:
Yahilyn Quintana (CUB)
Nathaniel Fuentes (PAN)

=== Final standings ===
Rank	Team
1st place, gold medalist(s)	Costa Rica
2nd place, silver medalist(s)	Guatemala
3rd place, bronze medalist(s)	El Salvador
4	Panama
5	Nicaragua
6	Honduras

== Women's tournament ==
=== Preliminary round ===
Pos	Team	Pld	W	D	L	GF	GA	GD	Pts	Qualification
1	Guatemala (H)	4	4	0	0	15	2	+13	12	Gold-medal Match
2	Costa Rica	4	3	0	1	9	3	+6	9	Gold-medal Match
3	El Salvador	4	1	1	2	9	8	+1	4	Bronze-medal Match
4	Panama	4	1	1	2	8	9	−1	4	Bronze-medal Match
5	Nicaragua	4	0	0	4	4	23	−19	0	

Source: FIH
Rules for classification: 1) points; 2) matches won; 3) goal difference; 4) goals for; 5) head-to-head result; 6) field goals for.
(H) Hosts

17 October 2025
11:00

Costa Rica	3–1	Nicaragua
Mata 10'; Mesen 16'; Cano 20'	Report	Ramirez 14'

Umpires:
Yahilyn Quintana (CUB)
Lisa Guzman (GUA)

17 October 2025
13:00

Panama	1–1	El Salvador
González 10'	Report	Rodríguez 17'

Umpires:
Jennifer Rojas (CRC)
Lisa Guzman (GUA)

17 October 2025
15:00

Guatemala	8–0	Nicaragua
Giron 2', 13'; Ureta 5'; Borrayo 7', 17'; Cifuentes 9', 20'; García 15'	Report

Umpires:
Yahilyn Quintana (CUB)
Jennifer Rojas (CRC)

18 October 2025
11:00

Costa Rica	4–0	El Salvador
	Report

Umpires:
Yahilyn Quintana (CUB)
Lisa Guzman (GUA)

18 October 2025
12:00

Panama	1–3	Guatemala
	Report

Umpires:
Jennifer Rojas (CRC)
Yahilyn Quintana (CUB)

18 October 2025
15:00

El Salvador	7–0	Nicaragua
	Report

Umpires:
Jennifer Rojas (CRC)
Lisa Guzman (GUA)

19 October 2025
11:00

Nicaragua	3–5	Panama
	Report

19 October 2025
12:00

Costa Rica	0–1	Guatemala
	Report

20 October 2025
11:00

Panama	1–2	Costa Rica
	Report

20 October 2025
13:00

Guatemala	3–1	El Salvador
	Report

=== Medal round ===
==== Bronze medal match ====
21 October 2025
13:00

El Salvador	3–2	Panama
	Report

Umpires:
Jennifer Rojas (CRC)
Lisa Guzman (GUA)

==== Gold medal match ====
21 October 2025
15:00

Guatemala	1–0	Costa Rica
	Report

Umpires:
Yahilyn Quintana (CUB)
Nathaniel Fuentes (PAN)

=== Final standings ===
Rank	Team
1st place, gold medalist(s)	Guatemala
2nd place, silver medalist(s)	Costa Rica
3rd place, bronze medalist(s)	El Salvador
4	Panama
5	Nicaragua
