= M35 at the 2012 European Masters Athletics Championships =

The eighteenth European Masters Athletics Championships were held in Zittau, Germany, Zgorzelec, Poland and Hrádek nad Nisou, Czech Republic, from August 16-25, 2012. The European Masters Athletics Championships serve the division of the sport of athletics for people over 35 years of age, referred to as masters athletics.

The championships were held in three locations near the German/Czech/Polish border.

Less countries participated compared with the last championships in Nyiregyhaza, but just over 700 more athletes participated, giving it the third greatest attendance of any championship run by European Masters Athletics ever.

== Results ==
=== 100 metres ===
Pos	Athlete	Country	Results
1st place, gold medalist(s)	Jochen Gippert	Germany	10.94
2nd place, silver medalist(s)	Ivan Zaitcev	Russia	11.04
3rd place, bronze medalist(s)	Aldo Marco Alaimo	Italy	11.10

=== 200 metres ===
Pos	Athlete	Country	Results
1st place, gold medalist(s)	Ivan Zaitcev	Russia	22.25
2nd place, silver medalist(s)	Baba Tindogo	Great Britain	22.37
3rd place, bronze medalist(s)	Ed White	Great Britain	22.49

=== 400 metres ===
Pos	Athlete	Country	Results
1st place, gold medalist(s)	Baba Tindogo	Great Britain	49.22
2nd place, silver medalist(s)	Brian Darby	Great Britain	50.17
3rd place, bronze medalist(s)	Anton Spiridonov	Russia	50.31

=== 800 metres ===
Pos	Athlete	Country	Results
1st place, gold medalist(s)	Marijn van der Putten	Netherlands	1:54.44
2nd place, silver medalist(s)	Christophe Chevaux	France	1:55.31
3rd place, bronze medalist(s)	Martin Aust	Czech Republic	1:56.84

=== 1500 metres ===
Pos	Athlete	Country	Results
1st place, gold medalist(s)	Leszek Zblewski	Poland	3:58.69
2nd place, silver medalist(s)	Fernando Marcos Lorenzo	Spain	3:59.69
3rd place, bronze medalist(s)	Manuel Dalla Brida	Italy	4:02.76

=== 5000 metres ===
Pos	Athlete	Country	Results
1st place, gold medalist(s)	Leszek Zblewski	Poland	15:42.80
2nd place, silver medalist(s)	Fidel Jorge Ruiz	Spain	15:43.66
3rd place, bronze medalist(s)	Robert Celinski	Poland	15:43.92

=== 10000 metres ===
Pos	Athlete	Country	Results
1st place, gold medalist(s)	Antonio Casado	Spain	31:07.24
2nd place, silver medalist(s)	Fidel Jorge Ruiz	Spain	32:02.32
3rd place, bronze medalist(s)	Dalibor Bartos	Czech Republic	33:11.37

=== 110 metres hurdles ===
Pos	Athlete	Country	Results
1st place, gold medalist(s)	Stefano Longoni	Italy	14.75
2nd place, silver medalist(s)	Martin Haslbeck	Germany	14.84
3rd place, bronze medalist(s)	Thomas Keller	Switzerland	14.89

=== 400 metres hurdles ===
Pos	Athlete	Country	Results
1st place, gold medalist(s)	Emilio Perez Fuster	Spain	55.77
2nd place, silver medalist(s)	Antonio Jara	Belgium	56.89
3rd place, bronze medalist(s)	Nils Milde	Germany	57.73

=== 3000 metres steeplechase ===
Pos	Athlete	Country	Results
1st place, gold medalist(s)	Sabino Gadaleta	Italy	9:59.34
2nd place, silver medalist(s)	Mihaly Szasz	Hungary	10:01.79
3rd place, bronze medalist(s)	Erik Framme	Sweden	10:06.98

=== 4×100 metres relay ===
Pos	Athletes	Country	Results
1st place, gold medalist(s)	Stanislav Lepik	Russia	43.29
1st place, gold medalist(s)	Anton Spiridonov	Russia	43.29
1st place, gold medalist(s)	Pavel Bubnov	Russia	43.29
1st place, gold medalist(s)	Ivan Zaitcev	Russia	43.29
2nd place, silver medalist(s)	Stuart Channon	Great Britain	43.59
2nd place, silver medalist(s)	Ed White	Great Britain	43.59
2nd place, silver medalist(s)	Matthew Muggeridge	Great Britain	43.59
2nd place, silver medalist(s)	Brian Darby	Great Britain	43.59
3rd place, bronze medalist(s)	Luigi Vanzo	Italy	44.97
3rd place, bronze medalist(s)	Vincenzo Conti	Italy	44.97
3rd place, bronze medalist(s)	Francesco di Leonardo	Italy	44.97
3rd place, bronze medalist(s)	Alessandro Gulino	Italy	44.97

=== 4×400 metres relay ===
Pos	Athletes	Country	Results
1st place, gold medalist(s)	Richard Rubenis	Great Britain	3:23.50
1st place, gold medalist(s)	Matthew Muggeridge	Great Britain	3:23.50
1st place, gold medalist(s)	Brian Darby	Great Britain	3:23.50
1st place, gold medalist(s)	Baba Tindogo	Great Britain	3:23.50
2nd place, silver medalist(s)	Thomas Schiessl	Germany	3:32.83
2nd place, silver medalist(s)	Klaus Bodenmueller	Germany	3:32.83
2nd place, silver medalist(s)	Nils Milde	Germany	3:32.83
2nd place, silver medalist(s)	Hubert Leineweber	Germany	3:32.83
3rd place, bronze medalist(s)	Vincenzo Conti	Italy	3:35.27
3rd place, bronze medalist(s)	Paolo Chiapperini	Italy	3:35.27
3rd place, bronze medalist(s)	Francesco di Leonardo	Italy	3:35.27
3rd place, bronze medalist(s)	Alessandro Gulino	Italy	3:35.27

=== Marathon ===
Pos	Athlete	Country	Results
1st place, gold medalist(s)	Oliver Sebrantke	Germany	2:37:33
2nd place, silver medalist(s)	Karsten Kuehne	Austria	2:40:23
3rd place, bronze medalist(s)	Andras Esso	Hungary	2:42:10

=== High jump ===
Pos	Athlete	Country	Results
1st place, gold medalist(s)	Francesco Arduini	Italy	2.05
2nd place, silver medalist(s)	Markus Rehak	Germany	1.91
3rd place, bronze medalist(s)	Vladimir Franek	Czech Republic	1.88

=== Pole vault ===
Pos	Athlete	Country	Results
1st place, gold medalist(s)	Chris Mills	Great Britain	4.50
2nd place, silver medalist(s)	Stefan Jeppsson	Sweden	4.30
3rd place, bronze medalist(s)	Pavel Fiedler	Czech Republic	3.90

=== Long jump ===
Pos	Athlete	Country	Results
1st place, gold medalist(s)	Vladimir Franek	Czech Republic	6.63
2nd place, silver medalist(s)	Holger Geweke	Germany	6.50
3rd place, bronze medalist(s)	Thomas Haenzi	Switzerland	6.39

=== Triple jump ===
Pos	Athlete	Country	Results
1st place, gold medalist(s)	Francesco Albore	Italy	14.48
2nd place, silver medalist(s)	Jose Angel Ipina Paris	Spain	13.81
3rd place, bronze medalist(s)	Emmanuel Alexer	France	13.58

=== Shot put ===
Pos	Athlete	Country	Results
1st place, gold medalist(s)	Andy Dittmar	Germany	18.35
2nd place, silver medalist(s)	Anouck Racordon	Switzerland	14.55
3rd place, bronze medalist(s)	Rene Schwarz	Germany	13.91

=== Discus throw ===
Pos	Athlete	Country	Results
1st place, gold medalist(s)	Soeren Voigt	Germany	47.53
2nd place, silver medalist(s)	Filip Peetrain	Belgium	46.06
3rd place, bronze medalist(s)	Rene Schwarz	Germany	44.79

=== Hammer throw ===
Pos	Athlete	Country	Results
1st place, gold medalist(s)	Simon Bown	Great Britain	60.75
2nd place, silver medalist(s)	Thomas Krenzer	Germany	51.25
3rd place, bronze medalist(s)	Mark Roberson	Great Britain	45.25

=== Javelin throw ===
Pos	Athlete	Country	Results
1st place, gold medalist(s)	Ricardo Parellada	Spain	58.90
2nd place, silver medalist(s)	Sami Salo	Finland	57.87
3rd place, bronze medalist(s)	Alberto Rey	Spain	57.08

=== Weight throw ===
Pos	Athlete	Country	Results
1st place, gold medalist(s)	Simon Bown	Great Britain	17.21
2nd place, silver medalist(s)	Thomas Krenzer	Germany	14.62
3rd place, bronze medalist(s)	Mark Roberson	Great Britain	13.58

=== Throws pentathlon ===
Pos	Athlete	Country	Results
1st place, gold medalist(s)	Jari Tourunen	Finland	3332
2nd place, silver medalist(s)	Brian Lesterhuis	Netherlands	3315
3rd place, bronze medalist(s)	Soeren Voigt	Germany	3266

=== Decathlon ===
Pos	Athlete	Country	Results
1st place, gold medalist(s)	Justin Francois	Netherlands	6593
2nd place, silver medalist(s)	Krzysztof Malkiewicz	Poland	6209
3rd place, bronze medalist(s)	Eric Roso	France	6152

=== 5000 metre track race walk ===
Pos	Athlete	Country	Results
1st place, gold medalist(s)	Steffen Borsch	Germany	22:04.47
2nd place, silver medalist(s)	Zdenko Medera	Slovakia	23:43.75
3rd place, bronze medalist(s)	Jose Rodriguez Jimenez	Spain	24:57.73

=== 20000 metre road race walk ===
Pos	Athlete	Country	Results
1st place, gold medalist(s)	Steffen Borsch	Germany	1:39:10
2nd place, silver medalist(s)	Zdenko Medera	Slovakia	1:43:50
3rd place, bronze medalist(s)	Ernesto Croci	Italy	1:48:39
