= Bicet =

Bicet is a surname. Notable people with the surname include:

- Frank Bicet (born 1971), Cuban-Spanish discus thrower
- Noleysi Bicet (born 1981), Cuban hammer thrower
- Nora Aída Bicet (born 1977), Spanish-Cuban javelin thrower
- Yusmay Bicet (born 1983), Cuban triple jumper
