= Henry Daley Colphon =

Costa Rican sprinter

Henry Daley Colphon (born 13 April 1970) is a Costa Rican sprinter who competed in the men's 100m competition at the 1992 Summer Olympics. His time of 11.11 seconds was not enough to qualify for the next round past the heats. His personal best was 10.70, set in 1992.
