= 2006 Central American Games =

VIII Central American Games
- Host city: Managua
- Country: Nicaragua
- Nations: 6
- Athletes: 1100
- Events: 19 sports
- Opening: March 3, 2006
- Closing: March 12, 2006
- Opened by: Melitón Sánchez
- Main venue: Estadio Olímpico del Instituto Nicaragüense de Juventud y Deporte

The VIII Central American Games (Spanish: VIII Juegos Deportivos Centroamericanos) was a multi-sport event that took place between 3 and 12 March 2006.

The games were initially scheduled between 9 and 18 December 2005 in Guatemala with support of El Salvador. However, the damages caused by Hurricane Stan in October 2005 led to the resignment of the designated hosts. Therefore, a minor and descentralized version of the games was organized with venues distributed in all participating five countries with local opening ceremonies being the main took place in Managua. The games were opened by ORDECA president Melitón Sánchez who was participating at Panama event.

The competition featured 19 sports which were contested at various venues. 10 sports were cancelled. El Salvador did not participate.

== Venues ==
- Nicaragua: athletics, baseball, bodybuilding, boxing.
- Panama: basketball, fencing, softball, swimming, wrestling.
- Costa Rica: chess, racquetball, taekwondo, triathlon.
- Guatemala: cycling, equestrian, shooting, weightlifting.
- Honduras: judo, table tennis.

== Sports ==
- Aquatic sports
  - Swimming
- Athletics
- Baseball
- Basketball
- Bodybuilding
- Boxing
- Chess
- Cycling
- Equestrian
- Fencing
- Judo
- Racquetball
- Shooting
- Softball
- Table tennis
- Taekwondo
- Triathlon
- Weightlifting
- Wrestling

== Medal table ==
There is no official medal table published by the organizers of the games. The table below is published in at least two sources. It is reported that a couple of medals were deprived retrospectively after protests from Costa Rica and Honduras.

Rank	Nation	Gold	Silver	Bronze	Total
1	Guatemala (GUA)	105	73	36	214
2	Costa Rica (CRC)	35	26	18	79
3	Nicaragua (NCA)	34	39	51	124
4	Honduras (HON)	24	46	53	123
5	Panama (PAN)	16	20	23	59
6	Belize (BLZ)	2	5	4	11
Totals (6 entries)		216	209	185	610
