= 1977 Central American Games =

II Central American Games
- Host city: San Salvador
- Country: El Salvador
- Nations: 5
- Athletes: 1282
- Events: 18 sports
- Opening: November 25, 1977
- Closing: December 4, 1977
- Opened by: Carlos Humberto Romero
- Main venue: Estadio Nacional De la Flor Blanca

The II Central American Games (Spanish: II Juegos Deportivos Centroamericanos) was a multi-sport event that took place between 25 November - 4 December 1977.

== Participation ==
Athletes from 5 countries were reported to participate:

- Costa Rica
- El Salvador (Host)
- Guatemala
- Nicaragua
- (Panama) Panamá

== Sports ==
The competition featured 18 sports.

- Aquatic sports
  - Swimming
  - Water polo
- Athletics
- Baseball
- Basketball
- Boxing
- Cycling
- Equestrian
- Fencing
- Football
- Gymnastics
- Judo
- Shooting
- Softball
- Table tennis
- Tennis
- Volleyball
- Weightlifting
- Wrestling

== Medal table (incomplete) ==
The table below is taken from El Diario de Hoy, San Salvador, El Salvador, and from the archives of La Nación, San José, Costa Rica. Medals from a shooting event are missing.

Rank	Nation	Gold	Silver	Bronze	Total
1	Panama (PAN)	68	49	43	160
2	El Salvador (ESA)	45	58	41	144
3	Costa Rica (CRC)	42	35	48	125
4	Guatemala (GUA)	37	38	41	116
5	Nicaragua (NCA)	9	12	23	44
Totals (5 entries)		201	192	196	589
