= 1973 Central American Games =

I Central American Games
- Host city: Guatemala City
- Country: Guatemala
- Nations: 6
- Athletes: 966
- Events: 16 sports
- Opening: November 24, 1973
- Closing: December 2, 1973
- Opened by: Alejandro Maldonado Aguirre
- Torch lighter: Mateo Flores
- Main venue: Estadio Nacional Mateo Flores

The I Central American Games (Spanish: I Juegos Deportivos Centroamericanos) was a multi-sport event that took place between 24 November - 2 December 1973.

The games were officially opened by Guatemalan Education Minister Alejandro Maldonado Aguirre. Long-distance runner Mateo Flores was honoured to light the torch in the stadium bearing his name. The flame was ignited before in Q'umarkaj, one of the ancient cultural Mayan centers located in El Quiché, Guatemala.

María del Milagro París from Costa Rica won 13 gold and 1 silver medals in the swimming contests, and was chosen as the best athlete of the games by the journalists.

== Participation ==
Athletes from 6 countries were reported to participate:

- Costa Rica
- El Salvador
- Guatemala (Host)
- Honduras
- Nicaragua
- (Panama) Panamá

== Sports ==
The competition featured 16 sports.

- Aquatic sports
  - Swimming
- Athletics
- Basketball
- Boxing
- Cycling
- Equestrian
- Fencing
- Football
- Judo
- Shooting
- Softball
- Table tennis
- Tennis
- Volleyball
- Weightlifting
- Wrestling

== Medal table ==
The table below is taken from El Diario de Hoy, San Salvador, El Salvador, from El Nuevo Diario, Managua, Nicaragua, and from the archives of La Nación, San José, Costa Rica.

Rank	Nation	Gold	Silver	Bronze	Total
1	Panama (PAN)	68	38	32	138
2	Guatemala (GUA)	36	49	45	130
3	Costa Rica (CRC)	29	24	32	85
4	El Salvador (ESA)	24	29	34	87
5	Nicaragua (NCA)	5	12	12	29
6	Honduras (HON)	1	2	0	3
Totals (6 entries)		163	154	155	472
