= 2010 Central American Games =

IX Central American Games
- Host city: Cities in Panama and El Salvador
- Nations: 6
- Athletes: 1.739
- Events: TBA events in 23 sports
- Opening: 9 April 2010
- Closing: 19 April 2010
- Opened by: Ricardo Martinelli
- Athlete's Oath: Leonardo González
- Torch lighter: Roberto Durán
- Main venue: Estadio Rommel Fernández

The IX Central American Games (Spanish: IX Juegos Deportivos Centroamericanos) was a multi-sport event that took place between 9 and 19 April 2010. The competition featured 23 sports which were contested at various venues, with Panama acting as the primary host country and El Salvador playing a supporting role.

== Preparation ==
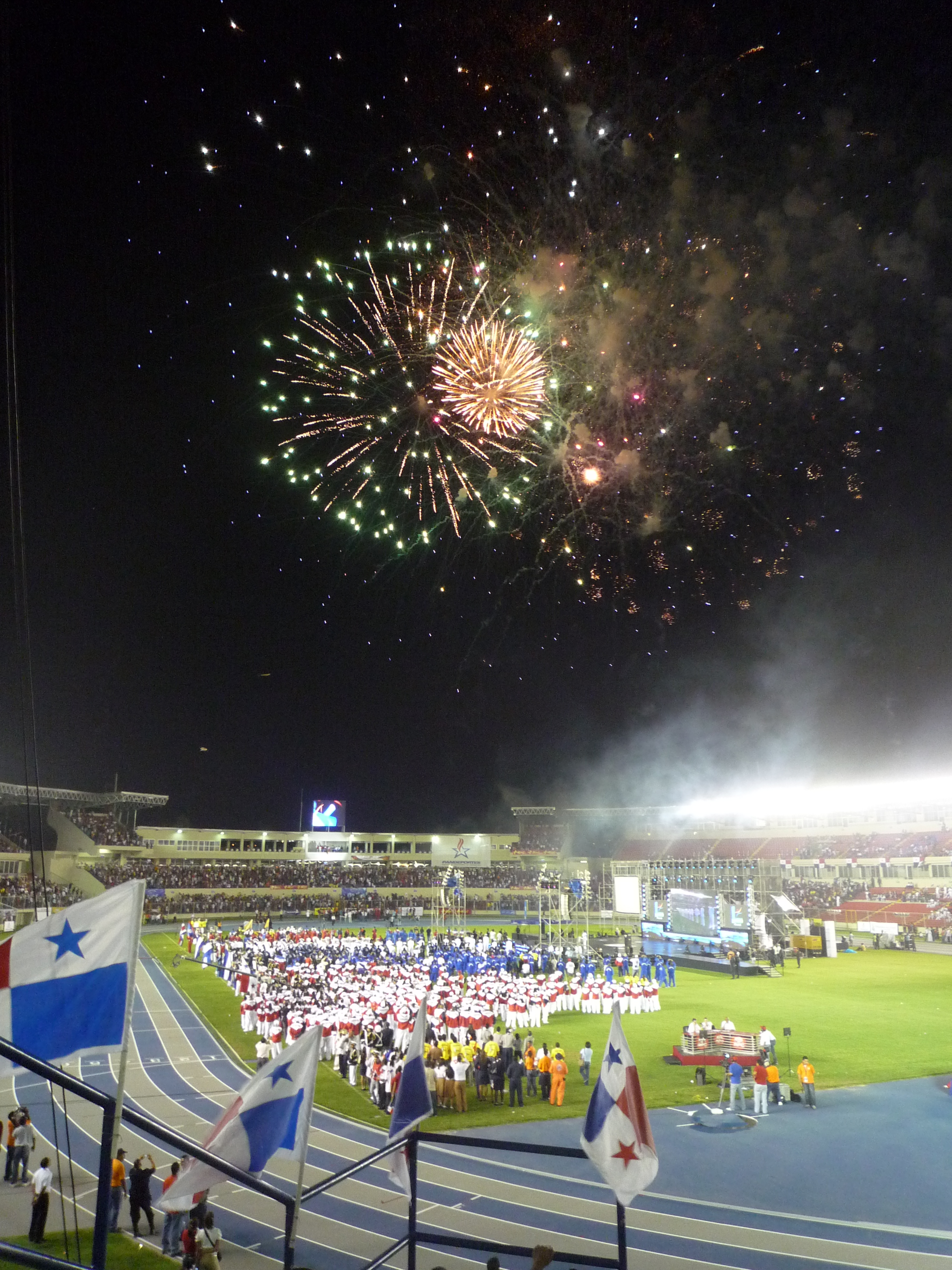
The opening the 2010 Central American Games

The event was delayed twice: it was first set to take place in San Pedro Sula in December 2009, but was cancelled due to the 2009 Honduran political crisis, and a second delay occurred at the request of Panama (one of the replacement host countries), who could not keep to the agreed 2–14 March programme due to delays in the renovation of the Estadio Rommel Fernández (where the athletics events were due to be held).

On top of this, in November 2009, El Salvador ruled out the possibility of four sporting events (skating, archery, squash and bodybuilding) as a result of economic problems caused by the extensive flooding in the country that month. Nevertheless, on 10 January 2010, Melitón Sánchez, the president of the Organización Deportiva Centroamericana (ORDECA), announced that the events would go ahead as originally planned.

However, the change of the games schedule led the Union Centroamericana de Futbol (the Central American Union for association football) to instruct its member associations not to compete at the event, as it clashed with the more prestigious XXI Central American and Caribbean Games. Following the news, Guatemala – also previously designated as a supporting host country – pulled out of the event in protest of the decision to postpone the games until April. In reaction to this, El Salvador, through the Instituto Nacional de los Deportes de El Salvador, announced that it too would withdraw, although its Olympic Committee reversed the decision.

In agreement with the games organisation committee, Panama decided to hold eight of the sports which were initially set to take place in Guatemala. The games' events began on 6 April. The Salvadorian delegation topped the medal table, taking its third victory in the competition's history.

== Opening and closing ceremonies ==
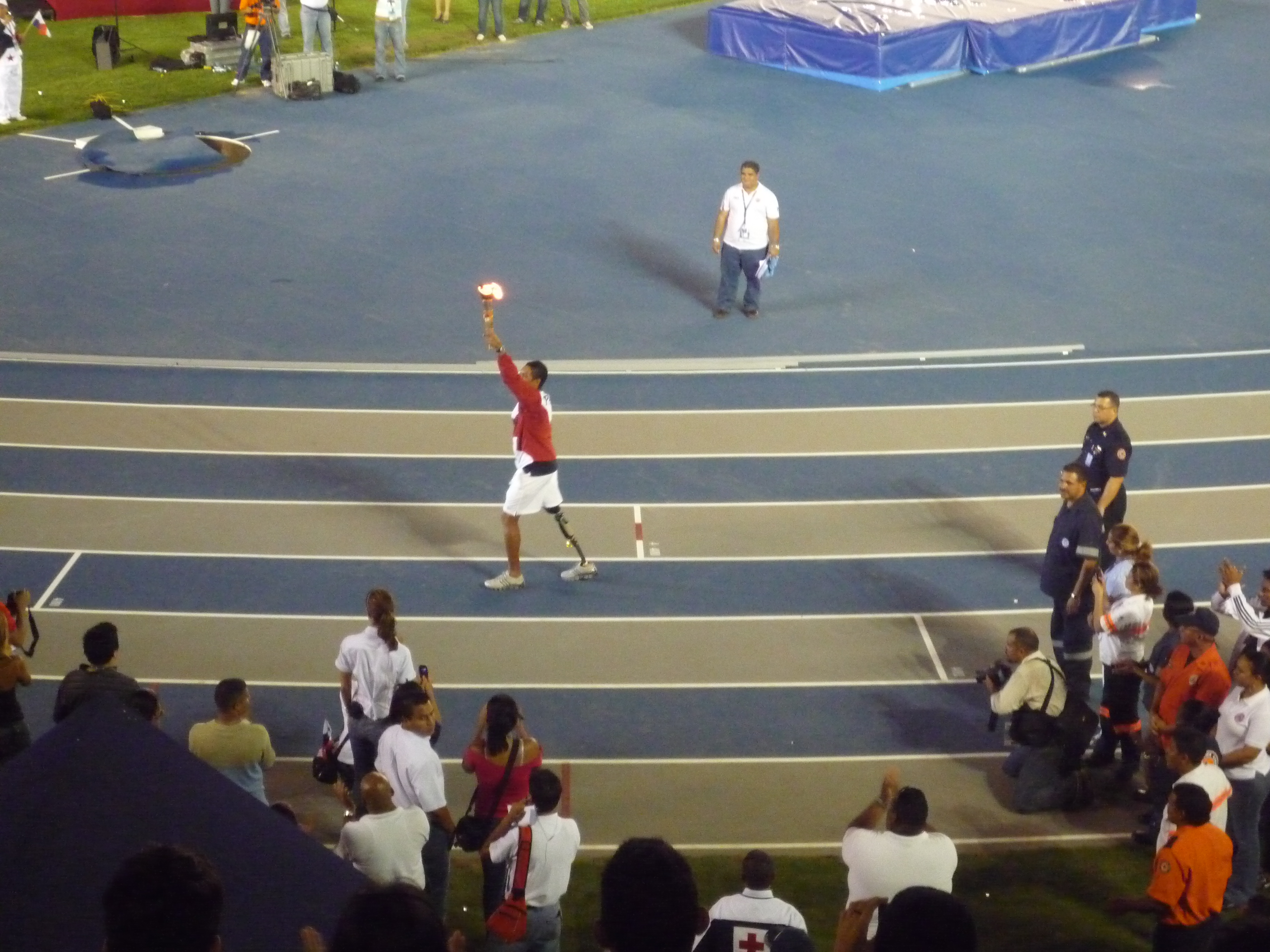
César Barría starting the relay of the games torch

The games were inaugurated by the President of Panama, Ricardo Martinelli, who emphasised in his speech that this was the first time the event would take place in the country. The duty of lighting the flame for the games was given to the former boxer Roberto Durán, whose role was preceded by a torch relay by César Barría, Ramiro Mendoza, Davis Peralta and Eileen Coparropa.

The games were closed by the presidential minister of Panama Demetrio Papadimitriu. In addition, a thank-you speech was given by the president of the organising committee, Edwin Cabrera. The ceremony was brought to a close by a musical spectacle delivered by Margarita Henríquez.

== Venues ==
- Panama: athletics, baseball, basketball, boxing, cycling, equestrian, gymnastics, handball, judo, karate, racquetball, softball, swimming, table tennis, taekwondo, triathlon, volleyball, weightlifting, and wrestling.
- El Salvador: fencing, bodybuilding, rowing, and archery.
- Sports not held due to the withdrawal of Guatemala as hosts: chess, badminton, modern pentathlon and shooting.
- Sports not held due to a lack of participation and/or economic problems: bowls, field hockey, frontenis, ice skating, squash, and tennis.

== Sports ==
- Aquatic sports
  - Swimming
- Archery
- Athletics
- Baseball
- Basketball
- Bodybuilding
- Boxing
- Cycling
- Equestrian
- Fencing
- Gymnastics
- Handball
- Judo
- Karate
- Racquetball
- Rowing
- Softball
- Table tennis
- Taekwondo
- Triathlon
- Volleyball
- Weightlifting
- Wrestling

== Games highlights ==
- Panamanian wrestler Leonardo González won his fifth consecutive gold medal of the Central American Games.
- The Nicaraguan men's basketball team took its first gold medal in the history of the regional event.
- Until 16 April, Panamanian athlete Andrea Ferris held the world's leading time for the season through her victory in the women's 800 metres run (2 minutes and 2.52 seconds). Ferris also succeeded in taking the gold medals in the 1500 metres and 3000 m steeplechase.
- Rigoberto Calderón of Nicaragua set a competition record by winning his sixth consecutive gold medal of the Central American Games in the men's javelin throw.
- Salvadorian swimmer Pamela Benítez accumulated eight gold medals and one silver over the course of the competition.

== Medal table ==
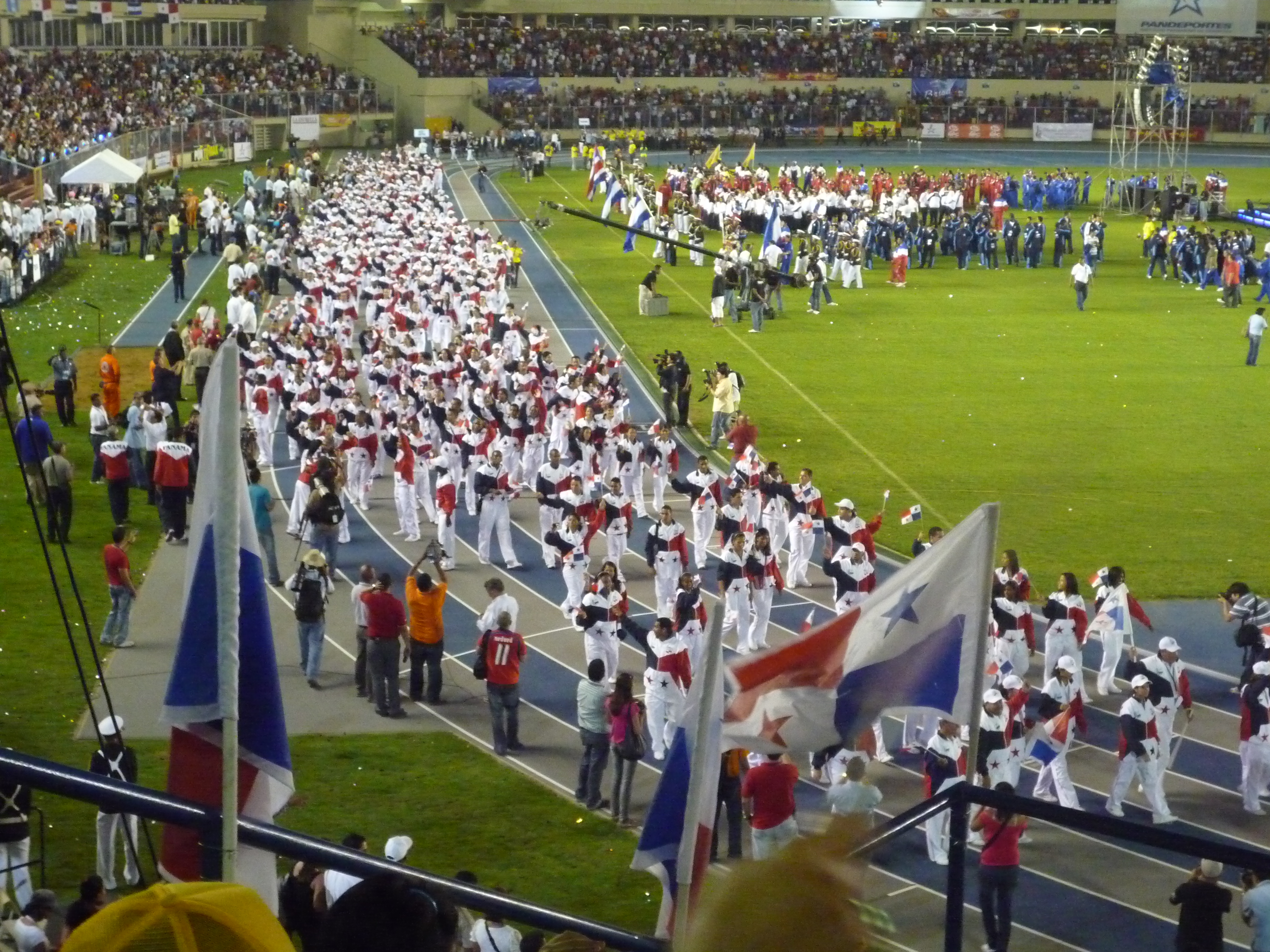
The delegation from Panama

Rank	Nation	Gold	Silver	Bronze	Total
1	El Salvador (ESA)	124	64	65	253
2	Costa Rica (CRC)	66	72	69	207
3	Panama (PAN)	58	78	75	211
4	Nicaragua (NIC)	24	44	79	147
5	Honduras (HON)	20	36	54	110
6	Belize (BLZ)	4	3	1	8
Totals (6 entries)		296	297	343	936

== Criticism ==
The delegations of Costa Rica, Guatemala and El Salvador voted against the decision to delay the event for a second time. Eduardo Palomo, the president of the Salvadorian Olympic Committee, said that the change would complicate other international commitments that the country's athletes had. Adding to this, the president of the Costa Rica Olympic Committee (Henry Núñez) also asserted that the change of the schedule posed a problem for its sportsmen and women. Acting in its behalf, the Guatemalan Olympic Committee declined its role as a host country and withdrew its participants from the games at the Guatemalan sports federations and athlete did not agree with ORDECA's decision to postpone the competition.
