= 2022 Central American Games =

- Host city: Santa Tecla
- Country: El Salvador
- Opening: 4 November 2022 (cancelled)
- Closing: 19 November 2022 (cancelled)

The 2022 Central American Games, the XII edition of the Central American Games, were to be hosted in Santa Tecla, El Salvador. This would have been the second time that the games were hosted outside the capital of the country.

The host city was announced on 1 December 2017. However, they were cancelled in 2021 due to the COVID-19 pandemic in El Salvador and the hosting rights were later given to Guatemala and Costa Rica. In 2022, the games were cancelled again after the IOC threatened to suspend the Guatemalan Olympic Committee.

== Venues ==
=== Santa Tecla ===
Venue	Capacity	Sports
Estadio Nacional Jorge "El Mágico" González	TBD	Athletics; Shooting
Arena Tecla (Proyecto)	TBD	Basketball; Boxing; Bodybuilding
Estadio Las Delicias	TBD	TBD; TBD
El Polideportivo de Ciudad Merliot	TBD	TBD; TBD
Estadio Saturnino Bengoa	TBD	TBD; TBD
Gimnasio Adolfo Pineda	TBD	TBD; TBD
Ecuestres San Andrés	TBD	TBD; TBD
Cancha de sóftbol Arnoldo Guzmán	TBD	TBD; TBD
