= Carel le Roux =

South African shot putter

Personal information
- Born: 31 August 1972 (age 54) Pretoria, South Africa

Sport
- Sport: Track and field
Medal record
Representing South Africa
African Championships
Gold medal – first place	1993 Durban	Shot put

Carel le Roux (born 31 August 1972) is a retired South African shot putter.

He won the gold medal at the 1993 African Championships finished fourth at the 1994 Commonwealth Games and fifteenth at the 1995 World Indoor Championships. His personal best put was 19.11 metres, achieved in February 1995 in Pretoria.

== Academic career ==
In his academic career, Carel le Roux graduated from medical school in Pretoria, South Africa, and completed specialized training in metabolic medicine at renowned institutions such as St Bartholomew’s Hospitals and the Hammersmith Hospitals. He earned a PhD from Imperial College London and later held a faculty position there.

Transitioning to academia, he assumed the chair in chemical pathology and metabolic medicine at University College Dublin. He currently serves as the director of the Metabolic Medicine Group at the university. Additionally, he holds esteemed positions as professor of metabolic medicine at Ulster University and as an extraordinary professor of chemical pathology at the University of Pretoria.

Le Roux has made significant contributions to transformative research in metabolic medicine, particularly in coordinating an Innovative Medicine Initiative project addressing obesity-related challenges. He has been honored with several prestigious awards, including the Irish Research Council Researcher of the Year award, a President of Ireland Young Researcher Award, the Irish Research Council Laureate Award, a Clinician Scientist Award from the National Institute Health Research in the UK, and a Wellcome Trust Clinical Research Fellowship, recognizing his groundbreaking work on the gut-brain communication system.
