= 2013 Central American Games =

- Host city: San José
- Country: Costa Rica
- Teams: 7
- Athletes: 2738
- Opening: March 3, 2013
- Closing: March 17, 2013
- Opened by: Laura Chinchilla
- Torch lighter: Sylvia Poll
- Main venue: Estadio Nacional
- Website: www.sanjose2013.com

The 2013 Central American Games, the X edition of the Central American Games, were celebrated in San José, Costa Rica from 3 to 17 March 2013. It was largest multi-sport event organized in Costa Rica.

The games were officially opened by Costa Rican president Laura Chinchilla. Torch lighter was swimmer Sylvia Poll, who won the silver medal at the 1988 Olympic Games in Seoul.

== Venues ==
=== San José, Costa Rica ===
Venue	Capacity	Sports
Estadio Nacional	35,062	Athletics; Chess; Football (soccer)
Estadio Ernesto Rohrmoser	TBD	Football (soccer)
Estadio Zapote	TBD	Football (soccer)
Parque Metropolitano La Sábana	TBD	Softball
Patinódromo del Parque Metropolitano	TBD	Roller speed skating
Avenida Paseo Colón	TBD	Roller speed skating
Gimnasio Nacional	TBD	Volleyball
Gimnasio Nacional Eddy Cortés	TBD	Artistic Gymnastic
Estadio de Beisbol Antonio Escarré	TBD	Baseball
Gimnasio de la Ciudad Deportiva de San José	TBD	Basketball; Handball
Piscina olímpica de la Ciudad Deportiva de San José	TBD	Swimming
Ciudad Deportiva de Hatillo	TBD	Racquetball
Cancha de Hatillo 7	TBD	Beach volleyball
Bol Cariari	TBD	Bowling
Gimnasio del Liceo de Costa Rica	TBD	Bodybuilding; Boxing; Taekwondo; Table tennis
Club Hípico La Caraña	TBD	Equestrianism
Nave de Ladrillo de La Antigua Aduana	TBD	Fencing
Radial de la Florencio del Castillo, and Route 32	TBD	Road Cycling
Gimnasio del Polideportivo de San Francisco de Dos Ríos	TBD	Weightlifting; Wrestling
Gimnasio del Colegio Técnico Profesional de Santa Ana	TBD	Futsal
Escuela Central de San Sebastián	TBD	Judo; Karate
Piscina María del Milagro Paris	TBD	Synchronized swimming
Parque de la Paz	TBD	BMX cycling
Tenis del Parque de La Paz	TBD	tennis
Universidad para La Paz	TBD	Mountain biking

=== Playa Herradura, Puntarenas ===
Open water swimming

=== Playa Hermosa, Guanacaste ===
Triathlon

=== Las Piedras, Guanacaste ===
Endurance riding (Equestrianism)

== Sports ==
- Aquatic sports
  - Open water swimming
  - Swimming
  - Synchronized swimming
- Athletics
- Baseball
- Basketball
- Bodybuilding
- Bowling
- Boxing
- Chess
- Cycling
  - BMX racing
  - Mountain biking
  - Road cycling
- Equestrian
- Fencing
- Football
  - Football
  - Futsal
  - Beach soccer
- Gymnastics
- Handball
- Judo
- Karate
- Racquetball
- Roller speed skating
- Softball
- Table tennis
- Taekwondo
- Triathlon
- Volleyball
  - Beach volleyball
  - Volleyball
- Weightlifting
- Wrestling

== Medal table ==
* Host nation (Costa Rica)

Rank	Nation	Gold	Silver	Bronze	Total
1	Guatemala (GUA)	100	100	92	292
2	Costa Rica (CRC)*	93	82	110	285
3	El Salvador (ESA)	67	68	68	203
4	Panama (PAN)	43	46	58	147
5	Honduras (HON)	33	29	44	106
6	Nicaragua (NIC)	15	27	71	113
7	Belize (BLZ)	1	1	2	4
Totals (7 entries)		352	353	445	1,150
