= Central American Games =

Central American multi-sport event

Central America

The Central American Games (Spanish: Juegos Deportivos Centroamericanos) are a multi-sport regional championships event, held quadrennial (every 4 years), typically in the first year after Summer Olympics. The Games are open for member federations of the Central American Sports Organization (Spanish: Organización Deportiva Centroamericana) ORDECA in Central American countries. (in Spanish)

The Games have had an equivalent to the Olympic Flame, being ignited in Q'umarkaj, one of the ancient cultural Mayan centers located in El Quiché, Guatemala. However, some people and organizations have criticised the games for not including the Mesoamerican ballgame, the oldest ball sport in the continent, on the sports programme.

The competition is the second multi-sport event to have the name: the Central American and Caribbean Games began life in 1926 as the Central American Games and had this moniker until it expanded its remit in 1935.

== Nations ==
- Belize
- Costa Rica
- El Salvador
- Guatemala
- Honduras
- Nicaragua
- Panama

== Editions ==
Host cities of the Central American Games

Games	Year	Host country (as recognized by IOC)	Host city	Opened by	Dates	Nations	Sports	Competitors	Top nation										
Games	Year	Host country (as recognized by IOC)	Host city	Opened by	Dates	Nations	Sports	Competitors	Top nation	1973	1	Guatemala	Guatemala City	Alejandro Maldonado Aguirre	24 November – 2 December	6	16	966	Panama
1977	2	El Salvador	San Salvador	Carlos Humberto Romero	25 November – 4 December	5	18	1282	Panama										
1986	3	Guatemala	Guatemala City		4–10 January	5	20	1320	Guatemala										
1990	4	Honduras	Tegucigalpa	José Azcona	5–14 January	6	22	2082	Guatemala										
1994	5	El Salvador	San Salvador	Armando Calderón Sol	25 November – 1 December	7	27	2112	El Salvador										
1997	6	Honduras	San Pedro Sula	Carlos Roberto Reina	5–15 December	7	25	2290	El Salvador										
2001	7	Guatemala	Guatemala City	Harris Whitbeck	22 November – 3 December	7	29	2182	Guatemala										
2006	8	Nicaragua	Managua	Melitón Sánchez	2–12 March	6	19	1095	Guatemala										
2010	9	Panama	Panama City	Ricardo Martinelli	9–19 April	6	23	1739	El Salvador										
2013	10	Costa Rica	San José	Laura Chinchilla	3–17 March	7	26	2738	Guatemala										
2017	11	Nicaragua	Managua	Daniel Ortega	3–17 December	7	27	3500	Guatemala										
2022	-	El Salvador	Santa Tecla		5–19 December (Cancelled)	7													
2025	12	Guatemala	Guatemala City		15–31 October	7	42	3446	Guatemala										

== All time medal table (1997 - 2025) ==
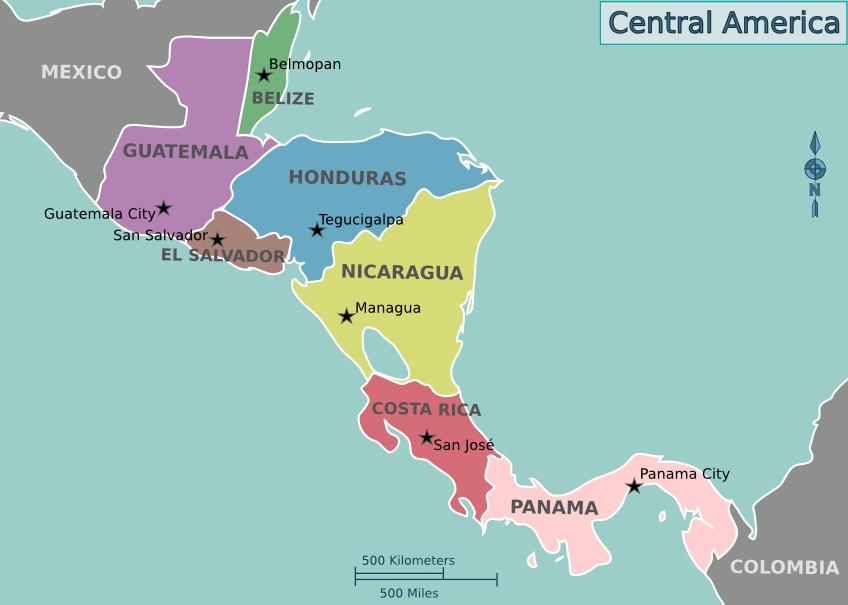
The seven countries of Central America and their capitals

Rank	Nation	Gold	Silver	Bronze	Total
1	Guatemala (GUA)	535	481	382	1,398
2	El Salvador (ESA)	463	351	388	1,202
3	Costa Rica (CRC)	342	343	375	1,060
4	Panama (PAN)	203	235	272	710
5	Nicaragua (NIC)	166	230	383	779
6	Honduras (HON)	166	225	333	724
7	Belize (BLZ)	11	25	32	68
Totals (7 entries)		1,886	1,890	2,165	5,941

== Sports ==
Disciplines from the same sport are grouped under the same color:

Aquatics – Cycling – Football – Gymnastics – Roller sports – Volleyball

Sport (Discipline)	Body		73	77	86	90	94	97	01	06	10	13	17
Sport (Discipline)	World	Central America	73	77	86	90	94	97	01	06	10	13	17
Diving	World Aquatics	CCCAN							X				
Open water swimming	World Aquatics	CCCAN										X	X
Swimming	World Aquatics	CCCAN	X	X	X	X	X	X	X	X	X	X	X
Synchronized swimming	World Aquatics	CCCAN							X			X	
Water polo	World Aquatics	CCCAN		X	X	X	X	X	X		X		
Archery	World Archery	COPARCO							X		X		
Athletics	World Athletics	CADICA	X	X	X	X	X	X	X	X	X	X	X
Badminton	BWF	BPA			X^{†}								
Baseball	WBSC	COPABE		X	X	X	X	X	X	X	X	X	X
Softball	WBSC	CONPASA	X	X	X	X	X	X	X	X	X	X	X
Basketball	FIBA	FIBA Americas	X	X	X	X	X	X	X	X	X	X	X
Bodybuilding	IFBB	CACBBFF				X^{†}	X	X	X	X	X	X	X
Bowling	IBF	PABCON			X	X	X	X	X			X	
Boxing	World Boxing	AMBC	X	X	X	X	X	X	X	X	X	X	X
Chess	FIDE	CCA			X	X	X	X	X	X		X	X
BMX racing	UCI	COPACI										X	
Mountain Biking	UCI	COPACI										X	X
Road Cycling	UCI	COPACI	X	X	X	X	X	X	X	X	X	X	X
Equestrian	FEI	PAEC	X	X	X	X	X	X	X	X	X	X	
Fencing	FIE	CPE	X	X	X	X	X	X	X	X	X	X	X
Football	FIFA	UNCAF	X	X	X	X	X	X	X			X	X
Futsal	FIFA	UNCAF							X			X	X
Gymnastics	World Gymnastics	UPAG		X	X	X	X	X	X		X	X	
Handball	IHF	PATHF							X		X	X	X
Judo	IJF	PJC	X	X	X	X	X	X	X	X	X	X	X
Karate	WKF	PKF					X	X	X		X	X	X
Racquetball	IRF	PARC				X	X	X	X	X	X	X	
Roller speed skating	World Skate	CPRS							X^{†}			X	
Rowing	World Rowing				X^{†}				X		X		X
Sailing	World Sailing				X^{†}		X						
Shooting	ISSF	CAT	X	X	X	X	X	X	X	X			
Squash	World Squash	FPS					X		X				
Table tennis	ITTF	LATTU	X	X	X	X	X	X	X	X	X	X	X
Taekwondo	World Taekwondo	PATU				X	X	X	X	X	X	X	X
Tennis	World Tennis	COTECC	X	X	X	X	X	X	X			X	X
Triathlon	World Triathlon	PATCO					X	X	X	X	X	X	X
Beach Volleyball	FIVB	NORCECA						X^{†}	X			X	X
Volleyball	FIVB	NORCECA	X	X	X	X	X	X	X		X	X	X
Weightlifting	IWF	PAWC	X	X	X	X	X	X	X	X	X	X	X
Wrestling	UWW	CPLA	X	X	X	X	X	X	X	X	X	X	X
Total sports			16	18	20+3	22+1	27	25+1	29+1	19	23		

^{†}: Exhibition contest

== Para Games ==
Year	Event	Opened by	Host country	Host city	Duration	Countries	Sports	Athletes
2013	1		Costa Rica	San Jose	13–21 April	6		
2018	2		Nicaragua	Managua	21–28 January	7		

== See also ==
- Central American and Caribbean Swimming Federation
- Central American and Caribbean Athletic Confederation
- Latin American Table Tennis Union
- Hispanic America
- Latin America
- Ibero-America
- Afro–Latin Americans
- Latin Americans
- Caribbean Sea
- Central_America#Demographics
