= 2025 Central American Games =

2025 sports competition

XII Central American Games XII Juegos Deportivos Centroamericanos
- Host city: Guatemala City
- Country: Guatemala
- Teams: 7
- Sport: 42
- Events: 56
- Opening: October 18, 2025
- Closing: October 30, 2025
- Torch lighter: Adriana Ruano
- Website: Official website

The 2025 Central American Games is the XII edition of the Central American Games, hosted in Guatemala City, Guatemala from 18 to 30 October 2025.

== Sports ==
The games will consist of a total of 42 different sports with 56 events.

- Archery (Details)
- Athletics (Details)
- Badminton (Details)
- Baseball (Details)
- Basketball (Details)
- Biking (Details)
- Billiards (Details)
- Bodybuilding (Details)
- Bowling (Details)
- Boxing (Details)
- Canoe (Details)
- Chess (Details)
- Equestrian (Details)
- Esports (Details)
- Fencing (Details)
- Hockey5s (Details)
- Flag football (Details)
- Football (Details)
- Football, Beach (Details)
- Futsal (Details)
- Golf (Details)
- Handball (Details)
- Judo (Details)
- Karate (Details)
- Kickboxing (Details)
- Rowing (Details)
- Rugby sevens (Details)
- Sailing (Details)
- Shooting (Details)
- Softball (Details)
- Speed skating (Details)
- Sport climbing (Details)
- Surfing (Details)
- Swimming (Details)
- Table tennis (Details)
- Taekwondo (Details)
- Tennis (Details)
- Triathlon (Details)
- Volleyball (Details)
- Weightlifting (Details)
- Wrestling (Details)

== Medal table ==
* Host nation (Guatemala)

Rank	Nation	Gold	Silver	Bronze	Total
1	Guatemala (GUA)*	198	153	112	463
2	Costa Rica (CRC)	78	93	95	266
3	Panama (PAN)	57	55	68	180
4	El Salvador (ESA)	56	65	87	208
5	Nicaragua (NIC)	38	58	92	188
6	Honduras (HON)	27	27	72	126
7	Belize (BLZ)	1	2	12	15
Totals (7 entries)		455	453	538	1,446

== Marketing ==
=== Theme song ===
On July 25, the official song titled Unidos por el Deporte (Spanish for "United by Sport") was revealed, named after the slogan. The song is performed by Adri Ibarguen, Hancer and Kontra Marín and produced by Francisco Páez.

=== Mascot ===
The mascot is a jaguar named Balami, created in homage to the Mesoamerican cultural heritage
