= ORDECA =

- Founded: July 15, 1972
- Regional affiliation: Central America

Official website
- ordecasports.org

The Central American Sports Organization (acronym: ORDECA; in Spanish: Organización Deportiva Centroamericana) is an international organization which represents the current 8 National Olympic Committees of the Central American region. It is affiliated with the Pan American Sports Organization.

It was established on 15 July 1972. It is recognised by the International Olympic Committee (IOC) that approved its creation at the Congress of the XX Olympiad, held in Munich, Germany, in 1972.

== Member nations ==
There are 7 affiliated National Olympic Committees:

| Nation | National Olympic Committee |
|---|---|
| Belize | Belize Olympic and Commonwealth Games Association |
| Costa Rica | Costa Rican Olympic Committee |
| El Salvador | El Salvador Olympic Committee |
| Guatemala | Guatemalan Olympic Committee |
| Honduras | Honduran Olympic Committee |
| Nicaragua | Nicaraguan Olympic Committee |
| Panama | Panama Olympic Committee |

== Administration ==
The ORDECA is the governing body of the Central American Games.

The then President of Olympic Committee of Guatemala Luis Canella Gutiérrez, was elected the first President of ORDECA.
