= 1986 Central American Games =

III Central American Games
- Host city: Guatemala City
- Country: Guatemala
- Nations: 5
- Athletes: 1320
- Events: 20 sports + 3 exhibition
- Opening: January 4, 1986
- Closing: January 10, 1986
- Torch lighter: Mateo Flores
- Main venue: Estadio Nacional Mateo Flores

The III Central American Games (Spanish: III Juegos Deportivos Centroamericanos) was a multi-sport event that took place between 4–10 January 1986. Initially, the Games were scheduled for 1981 in Managua, Nicaragua, but were cancelled due to the unstable political situation.

The Games were called the "Peace Games" (Spanish: Juegos de la Paz). The official song was the "Hymn of the Peace Games" (Spanish: Himno de los Juegos de la Paz) composed by Alfonso Agulló.

Long-distance runner Mateo Flores was honoured to light the torch in the stadium bearing his name.

A complete list of medal winners can be found on the MásGoles webpage (click on "JUEGOS CENTROAMERICANOS" in the low right corner).

== Participation ==
Athletes from 5 countries were reported to participate:

- Costa Rica
- El Salvador
- Guatemala (Host)
- Honduras
- Nicaragua

== Sports ==
The competition featured 20 sports (plus badminton, rowing, and sailing as exhibition).

- Aquatic sports
  - Swimming
  - Water polo
- Athletics
- Badminton^{†}
- Baseball
- Basketball
- Bowling
- Boxing
- Chess
- Cycling
- Equestrian
- Fencing
- Football
- Gymnastics
- Judo
- Rowing^{†}
- Sailing^{†}
- Shooting
- Softball
- Table tennis
- Tennis
- Volleyball
- Weightlifting
- Wrestling

^{†}: Exhibition event

== Medal table ==
The table below is taken from El Diario de Hoy, San Salvador, El Salvador, and from El Nuevo Diario, Managua, Nicaragua.

Rank	Nation	Gold	Silver	Bronze	Total
1	Guatemala (GUA)	107	88	44	239
2	Costa Rica (CRC)	49	45	55	149
3	Nicaragua (NCA)	31	34	41	106
4	El Salvador (ESA)	28	37	56	121
5	Honduras (HON)	3	12	21	36
Totals (5 entries)		218	216	217	651
