= Harris Whitbeck Sr. =

Guatemalan politician (1933–2019)

Harris Whitbeck Piñol (1933 – 4 December 2019) was a Guatemalan businessman. Whitbeck was a presidential candidate for Guatemala's Partido Patriota or Patriotic Party (PP) during national elections held in 2003. Whitbeck had previously been in the Frente Republicano Guatemalteco or Guatemalan Republican Front (FRG), the political party founded in 1989 by the former Guatemalan strongman and president, former Brigadier General Efraín Ríos Montt, a Christian evangelist who seized power in a coup toppling then dictator General Romeo Lucas García in 1982. Montt's regime was favored by Ronald Reagan's administration as a staunch U.S. ally and anti-communist bulwark during the turbulent 1980's when civil wars plagued Guatemala, El Salvador and Nicaragua. Prior to breaking away from the FRG, Harris Whitbeck had been one of Rios Montt's closest advisers.

Whitbeck died on 4 December 2019, at the age of 86. He was the father of Harris Whitbeck, a notable journalist.
