= 2001 Central American Games =

VII Central American Games
- Logo for the 2001 Central American Games
- Host city: Guatemala City
- Country: Guatemala
- Nations: 7
- Athletes: 2182
- Events: 30 sports
- Opening: November 25, 2001
- Closing: December 3, 2001
- Opened by: Harris Whitbeck
- Torch lighter: Euda Carías
- Main venue: Estadio Mateo Flores

The VII Central American Games (Spanish: VII Juegos Deportivos Centroamericanos) was a multi-sport event that took place between 22 November and 3 December 2001.

The games were opened by Harris Whitbeck as a delegate for Guatemalan president Alfonso Portillo. Torch lighter was Taekwondo fighter Euda Carías.

== Participation ==
A total of 2,182 athletes from 7 countries were reported to participate:

- Belize (149)
- Costa Rica (309)
- El Salvador (494)
- Guatemala (564) (Host)
- Honduras (334)
- Nicaragua (189)
- (Panama) Panamá (143)

== Sports ==
The competition featured 363 events (215 men, 135 women, 13 mixed) in 37 disciplines from 29 official sports (plus roller speed skating as exhibition event).

- Aquatic sports
  - Diving
  - Swimming
  - Synchronized swimming
  - Water polo
- Archery
- Athletics
- Baseball
- Basketball
- Bodybuilding
- Bowling
- Boxing
- Chess
- Cycling
- Equestrian
- Fencing
- Football
  - Football
  - Futsal
- Gymnastics
- Handball
- Judo
- Karate
- Racquetball
- Roller speed skating^{†}
- Rowing
- Shooting
- Softball
- Squash
- Table tennis
- Taekwondo
- Tennis
- Triathlon
- Volleyball
  - Beach volleyball
  - Volleyball
- Weightlifting
- Wrestling

^{†}: Exhibition contest

== Medal table ==
The table below is taken from Costa Rican newspaper La Nación, Nicaraguan medals are from El Nuevo Diario, Managua, Nicaragua.

Rank	Nation	Gold	Silver	Bronze	Total
1	Guatemala (GUA)	142	129	93	364
2	El Salvador (ESA)	140	113	88	341
3	Costa Rica (CRC)	40	61	70	171
4	Panama (PAN)	15	35	20	70
5	Nicaragua (NCA)	15	12	78	105
6	Honduras (HON)	11	35	61	107
7	Belize (BLZ)	3	5	13	21
Totals (7 entries)		366	390	423	1,179
