= 1997 Central American Games =

6th Central American Games, 1997

VI Central American Games
- Host city: San Pedro Sula
- Country: Honduras
- Nations: 7
- Events: 25 sports
- Opening: December 5, 1997
- Closing: December 15, 1997
- Opened by: Carlos Roberto Reina
- Main venue: Estadio Olímpico Metropolitano

The VI Central American Games (Spanish: VI Juegos Deportivos Centroamericanos) was a multi-sport event that took place between 5–15 December 1997. The shooting competitions were hosted by San Salvador, El Salvador.

The games had to be postponed, because the original date (5–14 September 1997) could not be kept for various reasons, among others delayed construction works.

The games were opened by Honduran president Carlos Roberto Reina.

== Venues ==
- Football: Estadio Olímpico Metropolitano and Estadio Francisco Morazán in San Pedro Sula, Estadio Excélsior in Puerto Cortés
- Shooting: San Salvador, El Salvador

== Participation ==
Athletes from 7 countries were reported to participate:

- Belize
- Costa Rica (277)
- El Salvador
- Guatemala
- Honduras (Host)
- Nicaragua
- (Panama) Panamá

== Sports ==
The competition featured 27 disciplines in 25 sports (plus beach volleyball as exhibition). The following list was compiled from a variety of articles from the archive of Costa Rican newspaper La Nación.

- Aquatic sports
  - Swimming
  - Water polo
- Athletics
- Baseball
- Basketball
- Bodybuilding
- Bowling
- Boxing
- Chess
- Cycling
- Equestrian
- Fencing
- Football
- Gymnastics
- Judo
- Karate
- Racquetball
- Shooting
- Softball
- Table tennis
- Taekwondo
- Tennis
- Triathlon
- Volleyball
  - Beach volleyball^{†}
  - Volleyball
- Weightlifting
- Wrestling

^{†}: Exhibition contest

== Medal table ==
The medals below are compiled from Costa Rican newspaper La Nación and from Nicaraguan newspapers La Prensa and El Nuevo Diario. The table is complete now.

Rank	Nation	Gold	Silver	Bronze	Total
1	El Salvador (ESA)	95	74	85	254
2	Guatemala (GUA)	78	92	71	241
3	Honduras (HON)	52	45	70	167
4	Costa Rica (CRC)	39	40	60	139
5	Panama (PAN)	29	24	29	82
6	Nicaragua (NCA)	20	21	54	95
7	Belize (BLZ)	1	7	8	16
Totals (7 entries)		314	303	377	994
