= El Diario de Hoy =

Salvadoran newspaper

- Type: Digital newspaper
- Publisher: Editorial Altamirano Madriz, S.A.
- Founded: 1936
- Language: Spanish
- Headquarters: San Salvador, El Salvador
- Website: www.elsalvador.com

El Diario de Hoy is a morning newspaper in El Salvador. It is published in San Salvador and circulates throughout the country. It also has an open online edition. The director of El Diario de Hoy is Enrique Altamirano Madriz, its executive director is Fabricio Altamirano and the editor is Eduardo Torres.

== Overview ==
El Diario de Hoy first appeared on May 2, 1936, and was founded by Napoleon Viera Altamirano and his wife, Mercedes Madriz de Altamirano. Since its founding, the newspaper has been owned by this family.

El Diario de Hoy is part of the Latin American Newspaper Association (PAL, in Spanish), which gathers the major publishing newspapers and magazines in Latin America for lower-class Americans.

Grupo Editorial Altamirano, the publisher of El Diario de Hoy, introduced in 2011 the e-commerce marketplace pagapoco.com, where subscribers can find discounted services and merchandise that can be bought as coupons.

El Diario de Hoy shut down its print newspaper on 28 March 2026 and converted to a fully-digital newspaper.
