= 1994 Central American Games =

V Central American Games
- Logo for the 1994 Central American Games
- Host city: San Salvador
- Country: El Salvador
- Nations: 7
- Athletes: 2112
- Events: 27 sports
- Opening: January 10, 1994
- Closing: January 23, 1994
- Opened by: Armando Calderón Sol
- Main venue: Estadio Flor Blanca

The V Central American Sports Games (Spanish: V Juegos Deportivos Centroamericanos) was a multi-sport event held in San Salvador, El Salvador between January 10 and January 23, 1994.

== Participating nations ==
Athletes from 7 countries were reported to participate:

- Belize
- Costa Rica (315)
- El Salvador (Host)
- Guatemala
- Honduras
- Nicaragua
- (Panama) Panamá

== Sports ==
The competition featured 27 sports.

- Aquatic sports
  - Swimming
  - Water polo
- Athletics
- Baseball
- Basketball
- Bodybuilding
- Bowling
- Boxing
- Chess
- Cycling
- Equestrian
- Fencing
- Football
- Gymnastics
- Judo
- Karate
- Racquetball
- Sailing
- Shooting
- Softball
- Squash
- Table tennis
- Taekwondo
- Tennis
- Triathlon
- Volleyball
- Weightlifting
- Wrestling

== Medal count ==
The information listed below was obtained from the Costa Rican newspaper La Nación, from El Diario de Hoy, San Salvador, El Salvador, and from El Nuevo Diario, Managua, Nicaragua.

Rank	Nation	Gold	Silver	Bronze	Total
1	El Salvador (ESA)	80	81	99	260
2	Costa Rica (CRC)	76	49	54	179
3	Guatemala (GUA)	74	91	76	241
4	Nicaragua (NCA)	42	45	45	132
5	Panama (PAN)	30	16	31	77
6	Honduras (HON)	20	40	56	116
7	Belize (BLZ)	1	2	5	8
Totals (7 entries)		323	324	366	1,013
