= 1990 Central American Games =

IV Central American Games
- Host city: Tegucigalpa
- Country: Honduras
- Nations: 6
- Athletes: 2082
- Events: 22 sports + 1 exhibition
- Opening: January 5, 1990
- Closing: January 14, 1990
- Opened by: José Azcona
- Torch lighter: Zacarías Arzú
- Main venue: Estadio Tiburcio Carías Andino

The IV Central American Games (Spanish: IV Juegos Deportivos Centroamericanos) was a multi-sport event that took place between 5–14 January 1990. The games were officially opened by Honduran president José Azcona. Torch lighter was Zacarías Arzú, who represented Honduras internationally in both baseball and football.

== Participation ==
Belize debuted on the games for the first time, Panamá did not participate because of the recent political and military incidents. Therefore, athletes from only 6 countries were reported to participate:

- Belize (139)
- Costa Rica (290)
- El Salvador (368)
- Guatemala (457)
- Honduras (487) (Host)
- Nicaragua (373)

The 1990 Central American and Caribbean Games in Mexico were staged in November and December 1990.

== Sports ==
The competition featured 23 disciplines from 22 sports (plus bodybuilding as exhibition).

- Aquatic sports
  - Swimming
  - Water polo
- Athletics
- Baseball
- Basketball
- Bodybuilding^{†}
- Bowling
- Boxing
- Chess
- Cycling
- Equestrian
- Fencing
- Football
- Gymnastics
- Judo
- Racquetball
- Shooting
- Softball
- Table tennis
- Taekwondo
- Tennis
- Volleyball
- Weightlifting
- Wrestling

^{†}: Exhibition event

== Medal table ==
The table below is taken from El Diario de Hoy, San Salvador, El Salvador, and from El Nuevo Diario, Managua, Nicaragua.

Rank	Nation	Gold	Silver	Bronze	Total
1	Guatemala (GUA)	82	98	82	262
2	Costa Rica (CRC)	66	47	44	157
3	Nicaragua (NCA)	59	39	49	147
4	El Salvador (ESA)	49	29	49	127
5	Honduras (HON)	20	44	68	132
6	Panama (PAN)	1	0	2	3
7	Belize (BIZ)	0	2	2	4
Totals (7 entries)		277	259	296	832
