= Athletics at the 1987 Summer Universiade – Men's 200 metres =

The men's 200 metres event at the 1987 Summer Universiade was held at the Stadion Maksimir in Zagreb on 16 and 17 July 1987.

== Medalists ==
Gold	Silver	Bronze
Wallace Spearmon; United States	Floyd Heard; United States	Edgardo Guilbe; Puerto Rico

== Results ==
=== Heats ===
Wind:
Heat 6: +1.4 m/s, Heat 10: +2.3 m/s

Rank	Heat	Athlete	Nationality	Time	Notes
1	4	Floyd Heard	United States	20.89	Q
2	4	Edgardo Guilbe	Puerto Rico	21.11	Q
3	2	Wallace Spearmon	United States	21.12	Q
4	8	Andrew Smith	Jamaica	21.18	Q
5	8	Andy Carrott	Great Britain	21.26	Q
6	2	Patrick Nwankwo	Nigeria	21.30	Q
7	9	Oleg Fatun	Soviet Union	21.32	Q
8	8	Mohammed El Kandoussi	Morocco	21.42	Q
9	2	Pál Karlik	Hungary	21.45	q
10	7	Cyprian Enweani	Canada	21.46	Q
11	10	Simon Baird	Great Britain	21.50	Q
12	1	Steve Morgan	Jamaica	21.60	Q
12	9	Mariusz Ozimek	Poland	21.60	Q
14	1	György Fetter	Hungary	21.66	Q
15	8	Álvaro Prenafeta	Chile	21.68	q
16	2	Phil Snoddy	Ireland	21.79	q
17	7	Paulo Curvelo	Portugal	21.80	Q
18	6	Andrew Meya	Uganda	21.81	Q
19	10	Víctor Andino	Puerto Rico	21.82	Q
20	9	Pedro Curvelo	Portugal	21.85	q
21	6	Steve Saunders	Australia	21.89	Q
22	4	Emilio Samayoa	Guatemala	21.94	q
23	3	Courtney Brown	Canada	22.03	Q
24	7	Issa Alassane-Ousséni	Benin	22.05	q
25	5	Domenico Gorla	Italy	22.08	Q
26	8	Herman Adam	Mexico	22.09	q
27	10	Prosper Chavarika	Zimbabwe	22.11	q
28	1	Moisés del Castillo	Peru	22.13	q
29	3	Itai Iluz	Israel	22.22	Q
29	6	Jorge Navarro	Mexico	22.22	q
31	1	Josephus Thomas	Sierra Leone	22.23	q
32	4	Irving Gil	Panama	22.26	
33	1	Ziad Abu Qazan	Jordan	22.32	
34	3	Mert Bursel	Turkey	22.35	
35	7	Alejandro Krauss	Chile	22.39	
36	10	Peter Fossey	Australia	22.41	
37	10	Tsagaan Odonbaiar	Mongolia	22.49	
38	3	David Ince	Barbados	22.50	
38	5	Hoang Cu	Vietnam	22.50	Q
40	6	Faustino Kiwa	Uganda	22.59	
41	4	Jonathan Njau	Tanzania	22.75	
42	8	Rafael Carmona	Costa Rica	22.77	
43	5	Hussein Yasser	Jordan	23.01	
44	9	Saihou Ceesay	Gambia	23.03	
45	10	Naderi Mirwais	Afghanistan	23.07	
46	2	Manuel Youness	Lebanon	23.15	
47	6	Tarek Mustapha Moussalli	Lebanon	23.26	
48	1	Sekou Diakite	Guinea	23.37	
49	6	José Flores	Honduras	23.39	
50	1	Chung Man Biu	Hong Kong	23.43	
51	4	Diallo Lama	Guinea	23.46	
52	5	Munyaradzi Chidanyika	Zimbabwe	23.61	
53	9	Chan Sai Keung	Hong Kong	23.82	
54	5	Abdulhakim Fegi	Libya	23.92	
55	10	Mohamed Shah Jalal	Bangladesh	24.03	
56	9	Abdelkarim Mutwakil	Sudan	25.42	
	1	Gabriel Okon	Nigeria	DNF	

=== Quarterfinals ===
Wind:
Heat 2: +1.4 m/s, Heat 3: +1.4 m/s, Heat 4: +1.4 m/s

Rank	Heat	Athlete	Nationality	Time	Notes
1	4	Wallace Spearmon	United States	20.67	Q
2	2	Floyd Heard	United States	20.70	Q
3	3	Edgardo Guilbe	Puerto Rico	20.72	Q
4	4	Steve Morgan	Jamaica	20.89	Q
5	2	Oleg Fatun	Soviet Union	20.94	Q
6	2	Courtney Brown	Canada	20.95	Q
7	4	Patrick Nwankwo	Nigeria	21.00	Q
8	1	Andy Carrott	Great Britain	21.12	Q
8	4	Simon Baird	Great Britain	21.12	Q
10	1	Andrew Smith	Jamaica	21.14	Q
11	2	Domenico Gorla	Italy	21.21	Q
12	3	Cyprian Enweani	Canada	21.22	Q
13	1	Mariusz Ozimek	Poland	21.43	Q
14	3	Mohammed El Kandoussi	Morocco	21.43	Q
15	2	Pál Karlik	Hungary	21.45	
16	1	György Fetter	Hungary	21.46	Q
17	3	Álvaro Prenafeta	Chile	21.52	Q
18	2	Phil Snoddy	Ireland	21.55	
19	2	Andrew Meya	Uganda	21.71	
20	1	Víctor Andino	Puerto Rico	21.82	
21	3	Issa Alassane-Ousséni	Benin	21.83	
22	4	Emilio Samayoa	Guatemala	21.83	
23	3	Pedro Curvelo	Portugal	21.87	
24	4	Steve Saunders	Australia	21.97	
25	1	Paulo Curvelo	Portugal	21.98	
26	4	Itai Iluz	Israel	22.02	
27	3	Herman Adam	Mexico	22.07	
28	1	Moisés del Castillo	Peru	22.11	
29	4	Prosper Chavarika	Zimbabwe	22.26	
30	3	Josephus Thomas	Sierra Leone	22.29	
	?	Jorge Navarro	Mexico	?	
	?	Hoang Cu	Vietnam	?	

=== Semifinals ===
Rank	Heat	Athlete	Nationality	Time	Notes
1	2	Floyd Heard	United States	20.73	Q
2	1	Wallace Spearmon	United States	20.91	Q
3	1	Edgardo Guilbe	Puerto Rico	20.96	Q
4	1	Oleg Fatun	Soviet Union	21.13	Q
5	1	Cyprian Enweani	Canada	21.13	Q
6	1	Andrew Smith	Jamaica	21.17	
7	2	Patrick Nwankwo	Nigeria	21.31	Q
8	2	Andy Carrott	Great Britain	21.40	Q
9	1	Simon Baird	Great Britain	21.53	
10	1	Mohammed El Kandoussi	Morocco	21.59	
11	2	Domenico Gorla	Italy	21.71	Q
12	2	György Fetter	Hungary	21.87	
13	2	Mariusz Ozimek	Poland	22.04	
	?	Steve Morgan	Jamaica	?	
	?	Courtney Brown	Canada	?	
	?	Álvaro Prenafeta	Chile	?	

=== Final ===
Wind: +1.4 m/s

Rank	Lane	Athlete	Nationality	Time	Notes
1st place, gold medalist(s)	4	Wallace Spearmon	United States	20.42	
2nd place, silver medalist(s)	3	Floyd Heard	United States	20.44	
3rd place, bronze medalist(s)	5	Edgardo Guilbe	Puerto Rico	20.92	
4	6	Cyprian Enweani	Canada	21.20	
5	2	Oleg Fatun	Soviet Union	21.21	
6	7	Andy Carrott	Great Britain	21.24	
7	8	Patrick Nwankwo	Nigeria	21.26	
8	1	Domenico Gorla	Italy	21.54	
