= Athletics at the 1987 Summer Universiade – Men's 100 metres =

The men's 100 metres event at the 1987 Summer Universiade was held at the Stadion Maksimir in Zagreb on 13 and 14 July 1987.

== Medalists ==
Gold	Silver	Bronze
Lee McRae; United States	Brian Cooper; United States	Bruno Marie-Rose; France

== Results ==
=== Heats ===
Wind:
Heat 1: +1.0 m/s, Heat 3: +1.0 m/s, Heat 5: +0.7 m/s, Heat 9: -0.6 m/s

Rank	Heat	Athlete	Nationality	Time	Notes
1	3	Bruno Marie-Rose	France	10.35	Q
2	6	Victor Edet	Nigeria	10.40	Q
3	10	Lee McRae	United States	10.41	Q
4	7	Hiroki Fuwa	Japan	10.47	Q
5	6	Andrew Smith	Jamaica	10.49	Q
6	4	Charles-Louis Seck	Senegal	10.55	Q
7	5	Rohan Wade	Jamaica	10.59	Q
8	1	Brian Cooper	United States	10.61	Q
8	2	Simon Baird	Great Britain	10.61	Q
10	5	Ho Sung-won	South Korea	10.63	Q
11	8	Amadou M'Baye	Senegal	10.64	Q
12	2	Endre Havas	Hungary	10.65	Q
13	8	Domenico Gorla	Italy	10.68	Q
14	4	Hirohisa Ota	Japan	10.69	Q
15	5	Ouattara Lagazane	Ivory Coast	10.70	Q
16	5	Phil Snoddy	Ireland	10.71	q
17	1	Valentín Rocandio	Spain	10.72	Q
18	8	Russell Boaler	Great Britain	10.72	Q
19	9	Simon Rudež	Yugoslavia	10.73	Q
20	10	Iziaq Adeyanju	Nigeria	10.74	Q
21	9	Anri Grigorov	Bulgaria	10.75	Q
22	1	Steve Saunders	Australia	10.77	Q
23	3	Víctor Andino	Puerto Rico	10.77	Q
24	3	Paulo Curvelo	Portugal	10.82	Q
24	4	Mike Dwyer	Canada	10.82	Q
26	7	Mohammed El Kandoussi	Morocco	10.82	Q
27	8	Richard Jones	Canada	10.83	q
28	2	Jean-Marc Anoman	Ivory Coast	10.87	Q
29	7	Emilio Samayoa	Guatemala	10.87	Q
30	9	Issa Alassane-Ousséni	Benin	10.88	Q
31	4	Pedro Curvelo	Portugal	10.89	
32	5	Herman Adam	Mexico	10.92	
33	8	Andrew Meya	Uganda	11.00	
34	7	Tsagaan Odonbaiar	Mongolia	11.01	
35	3	David Ince	Barbados	11.02	
35	6	Prosper Chavarika	Zimbabwe	11.02	Q
37	8	Álvaro Prenafeta	Chile	11.06	
38	2	Sivabalan Kesavan	Malaysia	11.07	
38	10	Nguyen Trung Hoa	Vietnam	11.07	Q
40	9	Peter Fossey	Australia	11.11	
41	5	Nguyen Phuong	Vietnam	11.12	
42	1	David Susame	Papua New Guinea	11.17	
42	10	Mert Bursel	Turkey	11.17	
44	6	Ziad Abu Qazan	Jordan	11.20	
45	6	Hanna Ziad	Lebanon	11.23	
46	9	Mohamed Ali Abdurrahim	Libya	11.27	
47	4	Jorge Avendaño	Mexico	11.29	
48	1	Saihou Ceesay	Gambia	11.33	
49	2	Rafael Carmona	Costa Rica	11.34	
50	3	Abdul Karim	Afghanistan	11.38	
51	10	Jihad Salame	Lebanon	11.39	
52	1	José Flores	Honduras	11.43	
53	9	Hussein Yasser	Jordan	11.45	
54	1	Munyaradzi Chidanyika	Zimbabwe	11.48	
55	10	Francisco Colón	Puerto Rico	11.50	
56	4	Tobie Sepe	Central African Republic	11.52	
57	4	Diallo Lama	Guinea	11.55	
58	9	Chan Sai Keung	Hong Kong	11.61	
59	1	Barney Bonne	Seychelles	11.62	
60	3	Ng Chi Wai	Hong Kong	11.79	
61	10	Juan Ordoñez	Mexico	11.85	
62	2	Mohamed Nour Haider	Sudan	12.00	
63	8	Abdulrazak Babakoli	Togo	12.03	
64	4	Hassan Gamal	Sudan	12.63	

=== Quarterfinals ===
Wind:
Heat 3: +1.0 m/s

Rank	Heat	Athlete	Nationality	Time	Notes
1	3	Bruno Marie-Rose	France	10.30	Q
2	2	Lee McRae	United States	10.41	Q
3	2	Victor Edet	Nigeria	10.42	Q
4	3	Andrew Smith	Jamaica	10.44	Q
5	3	Hiroki Fuwa	Japan	10.44	Q
6	1	Brian Cooper	United States	10.50	Q
6	2	Charles-Louis Seck	Senegal	10.50	Q
8	1	Iziaq Adeyanju	Nigeria	10.52	Q
9	1	Anri Grigorov	Bulgaria	10.61	Q
10	1	Mike Dwyer	Canada	10.62	Q
11	2	Richard Jones	Canada	10.69	Q
12	4	Hirohisa Ota	Japan	10.69	Q
13	1	Rohan Wade	Jamaica	10.70	
14	2	Domenico Gorla	Italy	10.73	
15	4	Simon Rudež	Yugoslavia	10.74	Q
16	2	Endre Havas	Hungary	10.77	
16	2	Valentín Rocandio	Spain	10.77	
18	3	Steve Saunders	Australia	10.81	Q
19	1	Russell Boaler	Great Britain	10.82	
19	4	Ouattara Lagazane	Ivory Coast	10.82	Q
21	4	Simon Baird	Great Britain	10.83	Q
22	1	Mohammed El Kandoussi	Morocco	10.87	
22	3	Jean-Marc Anoman	Ivory Coast	10.87	
24	4	Amadou M'Baye	Senegal	10.90	
25	4	Phil Snoddy	Ireland	10.94	
26	2	Emilio Samayoa	Guatemala	10.96	
27	4	Víctor Andino	Puerto Rico	10.98	
28	1	Paulo Curvelo	Portugal	11.06	
29	4	Prosper Chavarika	Zimbabwe	11.28	
30	3	Ho Sung-won	South Korea	16.32	
	3	Nguyen Trung Hoa	Vietnam	?	
	3	Issa Alassane-Ousséni	Benin	?	

=== Semifinals ===
Wind:
Heat 1: -1.1 m/s, Heat 2: ?

Rank	Heat	Athlete	Nationality	Time	Notes
1	2	Lee McRae	United States	10.39	Q
2	1	Bruno Marie-Rose	France	10.45	Q
3	1	Brian Cooper	United States	10.49	Q
4	1	Victor Edet	Nigeria	10.50	Q
4	2	Charles-Louis Seck	Senegal	10.50	Q
6	2	Andrew Smith	Jamaica	10.54	Q
7	1	Anri Grigorov	Bulgaria	10.63	Q
8	2	Iziaq Adeyanju	Nigeria	10.65	Q
9	1	Hiroki Fuwa	Japan	10.66	
10	1	Mike Dwyer	Canada	10.74	
11	2	Hirohisa Ota	Japan	10.74	
12	1	Simon Rudež	Yugoslavia	10.76	
13	2	Richard Jones	Canada	10.77	
14	2	Ouattara Lagazane	Ivory Coast	10.84	
15	2	Simon Baird	Great Britain	10.87	
16	1	Steve Saunders	Australia	10.97	

=== Final ===
Wind: +0.5 m/s

Rank	Lane	Athlete	Nationality	Time	Notes
1st place, gold medalist(s)	3	Lee McRae	United States	10.07	
2nd place, silver medalist(s)	5	Brian Cooper	United States	10.21	
3rd place, bronze medalist(s)	4	Bruno Marie-Rose	France	10.25	
4	7	Victor Edet	Nigeria	10.35	
5	2	Andrew Smith	Jamaica	10.39	
6	1	Iziaq Adeyanju	Nigeria	10.42	
7	6	Charles-Louis Seck	Senegal	10.45	
8	8	Anri Grigorov	Bulgaria	10.46	
