= Athletics at the 1987 Summer Universiade – Men's 4 × 100 metres relay =

The men's 4 × 100 metres relay event at the 1987 Summer Universiade was held at the Stadion Maksimir in Zagreb on 18 and 19 July 1987.

== Results ==
=== Heats ===
Rank	Heat	Nation	Athletes	Time	Notes
1	1	Japan	Shinji Aoto, Takashi Ichikawa, Hirohisa Ota, Hiroki Fuwa	39.74	Q
2	2	France	Pierre Boutry, Christophe Boyer, Jean-Charles Trouabal, Bruno Dufernez	39.75	Q
3	1	United States	Michael Marsh, Brian Cooper, Lorenzo Daniel, Lee McRae	40.10	Q
4	1	Nigeria	Victor Edet, Iziaq Adeyanju, Patrick Nwankwo, Augustine Olobia	40.21	Q
5	2	Hungary	László Daragó, György Fetter, Pál Karlik, Endre Havas	40.35	Q
6	2	Jamaica	Steve Morgan, Rohan Wade, Andrew Smith, Donald Porter	40.48	Q
7	2	Ivory Coast	Ouattara Lagazane, Jean-Bertin Kouamé Konan, Otokpa Kouadio, Jean-Marc Anoman	40.53	q
8	1	Vietnam	Nugyen Trung Hoa, Nguyen Phuong, Hoang Cu, Nugyen Dinh Minh	42.85	q
9	2	Jordan	Ziad Abu Qazan, Hesham Mugbel, Maher Abou Hajleh, Hussein Yasser	43.20	
10	2	Hong Kong	Ng Chi Wai, Lee Ka Kit, Chung Man Biu, Chan Sai Keung	44.26	
	2	Canada	Richard Jones, Mike Dwyer, Cyprean Enweani, Courtney Brown	DNF	

=== Final ===
Rank	Nation	Athletes	Time	Notes
1st place, gold medalist(s)	United States	Lee McRae, Floyd Heard, Lorenzo Daniel, Wallace Spearmon	38.66	
2nd place, silver medalist(s)	France	Pierre Boutry, Christophe Boyer, Jean-Charles Trouabal, Bruno Dufernez	39.42	
3rd place, bronze medalist(s)	Japan	Shinji Aoto, Takashi Ichikawa, Hirohisa Ota, Hiroki Fuwa	39.57	
4	Hungary	László Daragó, György Fetter, Pál Karlik, Endre Havas	40.50	
5	Ivory Coast	Ouattara Lagazane, Jean-Bertin Kouamé Konan, Otokpa Kouadio, Jean-Marc Anoman	40.88	
6	Vietnam	Nugyen Trung Hoa, Nguyen Phuong, Hoang Cu, Nugyen Dinh Minh	42.72	
	Nigeria	Augustine Olobia, Iziaq Adeyanju, Patrick Nwankwo, Victor Edet	DQ	
	Jamaica		DNS	
