= Athletics at the 1987 Pan American Games – Men's 200 metres =

Men's 200 metres at the Pan American Games

The men's 200 metres event at the 1987 Pan American Games was held in Indianapolis, United States on 12, 13 and 15 August.

== Medalists ==
| Gold | Silver | Bronze |
|---|---|---|
| Floyd Heard; United States | Robson da Silva; Brazil | Wallace Spearmon Sr. United States |

== Results ==
=== Heats ===
Wind:
Heat 1: -0.5 m/s, Heat 2: -1.1 m/s, Heat 3: -0.8 m/s

| Rank | Heat | Name | Nationality | Time | Notes |
|---|---|---|---|---|---|
| 1 | 1 | Floyd Heard | United States | 20.70 | Q |
| 2 | 2 | Robson da Silva | Brazil | 20.79 | Q |
| 3 | 2 | Wallace Spearmon Sr. | United States | 20.89 | Q |
| 4 | 3 | Clive Wright | Jamaica | 21.02 | Q |
| 5 | 2 | John Mair | Jamaica | 21.08 | Q |
| 6 | 2 | Edgardo Guilbe | Puerto Rico | 21.10 | Q |
| 7 | 2 | Alvin Daniel | Trinidad and Tobago | 21.11 | q |
| 8 | 3 | Leandro Peñalver | Cuba | 21.12 | Q |
| 9 | 1 | Arnaldo da Silva | Brazil | 21.27 | Q |
| 9 | 3 | Neville Hodge | United States Virgin Islands | 21.27 | Q |
| 11 | 1 | Félix Stevens | Cuba | 21.30 | Q |
| 12 | 3 | Dazel Jules | Trinidad and Tobago | 21.39 | Q |
| 13 | 3 | Carlos Moreno | Chile | 21.82 | q |
| 14 | 3 | Rafael Mejía | Colombia | 21.93 | q |
| 15 | 3 | Damel Flowers | Belize | 22.14 | q |
| 16 | 3 | Bernard Whyte | Antigua and Barbuda | 22.17 | |
| 17 | 1 | Lindel Hodge | British Virgin Islands | 22.53 | Q |
| 18 | 2 | Ulric Jackson | United States Virgin Islands | 23.08 | |
| 19 | 1 | Claude Roumain | Haiti | 23.30 | |
| | 1 | Luis Morales | Puerto Rico | DNS | |
| | 1 | Juan Núñez | Dominican Republic | DNS | |
| | 2 | Lawrence Smith | Belize | DNS | |
| | 2 | St. Clair Soleyne | Antigua and Barbuda | DNS | |

=== Semifinals ===
Wind:
Heat 1: -1.0 m/s, Heat 2: -1.2 m/s

| Rank | Heat | Name | Nationality | Time | Notes |
|---|---|---|---|---|---|
| 1 | 2 | Robson da Silva | Brazil | 20.59 | Q |
| 2 | 2 | Arnaldo da Silva | Brazil | 20.71 | Q |
| 3 | 1 | Floyd Heard | United States | 20.72 | Q |
| 4 | 2 | Clive Wright | Jamaica | 20.81 | Q |
| 5 | 1 | Wallace Spearmon Sr. | United States | 20.89 | Q |
| 6 | 1 | Leandro Peñalver | Cuba | 20.96 | Q |
| 7 | 2 | John Mair | Jamaica | 21.01 | Q |
| 8 | 2 | Edgardo Guilbe | Puerto Rico | 21.19 | |
| 9 | 1 | Félix Stevens | Cuba | 21.22 | Q |
| 10 | 2 | Dazel Jules | Trinidad and Tobago | 21.26 | |
| 11 | 1 | Alvin Daniel | Trinidad and Tobago | 21.41 | |
| 12 | 1 | Neville Hodge | United States Virgin Islands | 21.61 | |
| 13 | 2 | Carlos Moreno | Chile | 21.78 | |
| 14 | 2 | Rafael Mejía | Colombia | 21.99 | |
| 15 | 1 | Damel Flowers | Belize | 22.05 | |
| 16 | 1 | Lindel Hodge | British Virgin Islands | 22.36 | |

=== Final ===
Wind: +1.3 m/s

| Rank | Lane | Name | Nationality | Time | Notes |
|---|---|---|---|---|---|
| 1st place, gold medalist(s) | 4 | Floyd Heard | United States | 20.25 | |
| 2nd place, silver medalist(s) | 5 | Robson da Silva | Brazil | 20.49 | |
| 3rd place, bronze medalist(s) | 7 | Wallace Spearmon Sr. | United States | 20.53 | |
| 4 | 1 | Leandro Peñalver | Cuba | 20.73 | |
| 5 | 6 | Clive Wright | Jamaica | 20.73 | |
| 6 | 3 | Arnaldo da Silva | Brazil | 20.81 | |
| 7 | 8 | Félix Stevens | Cuba | 21.11 | |
| 8 | 2 | John Mair | Jamaica | 21.22 | |
