= Athletics at the 1990 Goodwill Games – Results =

These are the official results of the athletics competition at the 1990 Goodwill Games which took place between July 22 and 26, 1990, at the Husky Stadium in Seattle, Washington, United States.

== Men's results ==
=== 100 meters ===
July 23
Wind: +1.1 m/s

Rank	Lane	Name	Nationality	Time	Notes
1st place, gold medalist(s)	5	Leroy Burrell	United States	10.05	
2nd place, silver medalist(s)	4	Carl Lewis	United States	10.08	
3rd place, bronze medalist(s)	3	Mark Witherspoon	United States	10.17	
4	7	Dennis Mitchell	United States	10.26	
5	6	Andre Cason	United States	10.28	
6	2	Andrés Simón	Cuba	10.30	
7	1	Pavel Galkin	Soviet Union	10.42	
8	8	Ray Stewart	Jamaica	10.42	

=== 200 meters ===
July 24

Rank	Lane	Name	Nationality	Time	Notes
1st place, gold medalist(s)	4	Michael Johnson	United States	20.54	
2nd place, silver medalist(s)	2	Robson da Silva	Brazil	20.77	
3rd place, bronze medalist(s)	8	Dennis Mitchell	United States	20.89	
4	3	Jeff Williams	United States	20.93	
5	7	Félix Stevens	Cuba	21.16	
6	1	Cyprian Enweani	Canada	21.27	
7	5	Daron Council	United States	21.33	
8	6	Mikhail Vdovin	Soviet Union	21.63	

=== 400 meters ===
July 24

Rank	Lane	Name	Nationality	Time	Notes
1st place, gold medalist(s)	5	Roberto Hernández	Cuba	44.79	GR
2nd place, silver medalist(s)	4	Danny Everett	United States	45.05	
3rd place, bronze medalist(s)	6	Andrew Valmon	United States	45.46	
4	3	Tim Simon	United States	45.60	
5	7	Antonio Pettigrew	United States	46.20	
6	2	Yevgeniy Lomtyev	Soviet Union	46.93	
7	8	Aivar Ojastu	Soviet Union	47.00	
8	1	Aleksey Petukhov	Soviet Union	47.13	

=== 800 meters ===
July 22

Rank	Name	Nationality	Time	Notes
1st place, gold medalist(s)	George Kersh	United States	1:45.10	GR
2nd place, silver medalist(s)	Mark Everett	United States	1:45.80	
3rd place, bronze medalist(s)	José Luíz Barbosa	Brazil	1:45.81	
4	Ocky Clark	United States	1:45.81	
5	Andrey Sudnik	Soviet Union	1:46.24	
6	Valeriy Starodubtsev	Soviet Union	1:47.24	
7	Johnny Gray	United States	1:48.08	
	William Tanui	Kenya	DNS	

=== 1500 meters ===
July 23

Rank	Name	Nationality	Time	Notes
1st place, gold medalist(s)	Joe Falcon	United States	3:39.97	
2nd place, silver medalist(s)	William Tanui	Kenya	3:40.13	
3rd place, bronze medalist(s)	Marcus O'Sullivan	Ireland	3:40.58	
4	Sergey Afanasyev	Soviet Union	3:41.15	
5	Maurice Smith	United States	3:41.18	
6	Davide Tirelli	Italy	3:41.58	
7	Vladimir Kolpakov	Soviet Union	3:42.07	
8	Abdelaziz Sahere	Morocco	3:42.18	
9	Paul Vandegrift	United States	3:42.24	
10	Mohamed Shumassi	Morocco	3:43.51	
	Nacer Brahmia	Algeria	DNF	

=== 5000 meters ===
July 22

Rank	Name	Nationality	Time	Notes
1st place, gold medalist(s)	Paul Williams	Canada	13:33.52	GR
2nd place, silver medalist(s)	Addis Abebe	Ethiopia	13:35.67	
3rd place, bronze medalist(s)	Mikhail Dasko	Soviet Union	13:36.44	
4	Terry Brahm	United States	13:42.49	
5	Rueben Reina	United States	13:47.90	
6	Nikolay Chamyev	Soviet Union	13:49.43	
7	Bob Kennedy	United States	13:57.22	
8	Debebe Demisse	Ethiopia	13:59.35	
9	Mohamed Mourhit	Morocco	14:08.52	
10	Sergey Smirnov	Soviet Union	14:08.90	
11	Doug Padilla	United States	14:26.92	
12	Ignacio Fragoso	Mexico	14:49.15	
	Mauricio González	Mexico	DNF	
	João Campos	Portugal	DNS	

=== 10,000 meters ===
July 25

Rank	Name	Nationality	Time	Notes
1st place, gold medalist(s)	Hammou Boutayeb	Morocco	27:26.43	GR
2nd place, silver medalist(s)	Addis Abebe	Ethiopia	27:42.65	
3rd place, bronze medalist(s)	John Ngugi	Kenya	27:42.95	
4	Gerardo Alcalá	Mexico	27:43.07	
5	Moses Tanui	Kenya	27:43.62	
6	Steve Plasencia	United States	27:45.20	
7	Pat Porter	United States	27:56.20	
8	Aaron Ramirez	United States	28:08.56	
9	Bedilu Kibret	Ethiopia	28:15.51	
10	Oleg Strizhakov	Soviet Union	28:16.15	
11	Ed Eyestone	United States	28:17.58	
12	Chala Kelele	Ethiopia	28:18.50	
13	Rolando Vera	Ecuador	28:19.22	
14	Rafael Zepeda	Mexico	28:41.53	
15	Sergey Smirnov	Soviet Union	28:45.04	
16	Sid-Ali Sakhri	Algeria	29:03.59	
17	Carey Nelson	Canada	29:24.32	
18	Herbert Steffny	West Germany	29:56.62	
19	Pedro Ortiz	Colombia	30:22.45	
	Abdelaziz Sahere	Morocco	DNF	
	Mohamed Shumassi	Morocco	DNF	
	Gidamis Shahanga	Tanzania	DNF	
	Mikhail Dasko	Soviet Union	DNS	

=== Marathon ===
July 22

Rank	Name	Nationality	Time	Notes
1st place, gold medalist(s)	Dave Mora	United States	2:14:49.27	
2nd place, silver medalist(s)	Nikolay Tabak	Soviet Union	2:16:27.64	
3rd place, bronze medalist(s)	Peter Maher	Canada	2:17:15.33	
4	Budd Coates	United States	2:18:57.86	
5	Taleb Tounsi	France	2:19:38.31	
6	Zerihun Gizaw	Ethiopia	2:20:46.57	
7	Wodajo Bulti	Ethiopia	2:21:56.45	
8	Viktor Mozgovoy	Soviet Union	2:23:26.38	
9	Thomas Robert Naali	Tanzania	2:23:46.27	
10	Aleksandr Vychuzhanin	Soviet Union	2:23:53.23	
11	Ricardo Cuéllar	Mexico	2:24:50.31	
12	Mike Keohane	United States	2:26:05.08	
13	Jean-Luc Assemat	France	2:26:18.58	
14	Francisco Rivera	Mexico	2:29:25.27	
	Jerry Marsh	United States	DNF	
	Sergey Rozum	Soviet Union	DNF	

=== 110 meters hurdles ===
July 23

Rank	Lane	Name	Nationality	Time	Notes
1st place, gold medalist(s)	5	Roger Kingdom	United States	13.47	
2nd place, silver medalist(s)	4	Tony Dees	United States	13.48	
3rd place, bronze medalist(s)	3	Arthur Blake	United States	13.53	
4	8	Cletus Clark	United States	13.62	
5	7	Igor Kazanov	Soviet Union	13.71	
6	2	Sergey Usov	Soviet Union	13.95	
7	1	Li Tong	China	14.05	
	6	Tonie Campbell	United States	DQ	

=== 400 meters hurdles ===
July 22

Rank	Name	Nationality	Time	Notes
1st place, gold medalist(s)	Winthrop Graham	Jamaica	48.78	
2nd place, silver medalist(s)	David Patrick	United States	49.00	
3rd place, bronze medalist(s)	Kevin Young	United States	49.17	
4	Nat Page	United States	49.34	
5	Aleksey Bazarov	Soviet Union	50.13	
6	Kevin Henderson	United States	50.48	
7	Vadim Zadoinov	Soviet Union	50.48	
8	George Porter	United States	51.17	

=== 3000 meters steeplechase ===
July 24

Rank	Name	Nationality	Time	Notes
1st place, gold medalist(s)	Brian Diemer	United States	8:32.24	
2nd place, silver medalist(s)	Vasily Koromyslov	Soviet Union	8:33.76	
3rd place, bronze medalist(s)	Valeriy Vandyak	Soviet Union	8:34.18	
4	Mark Croghan	United States	8:35.60	
5	Bruno Coutant	France	8:36.86	
6	Mark Coogan	United States	8:41.27	
7	Franco Boffi	Italy	8:50.45	
	Graeme Fell	Canada	DNS	
	Patrick Sang	Kenya	DNS	
	Micah Boinet	Kenya	DNS	

=== 4 x 100 meters relay ===
July 26

Rank	Lane	Nation	Competitors	Time	Notes
1st place, gold medalist(s)	6	United States	Mike Marsh, Daron Council, Andre Cason, Dennis Mitchell	38.45	
2nd place, silver medalist(s)	4	Cuba	Andrés Simón, Leandro Peñalver, Félix Stevens, Joel Isasi	38.49	
3rd place, bronze medalist(s)	5	Soviet Union	Viktor Bryzgin, Vladimir Krylov, Oleg Fatun, Pavel Galkin	38.96	
4	3	Nigeria	Yemi Aladefa, Osmond Ezinwa, Victor Nwankwo, Davidson Ezinwa	39.38	
5	8	Canada	Cyprian Enweani, Mike Dwyer, Brad McCuaig, Bruny Surin	39.39	
6	7	Jamaica	Wayne Watson, John Mair, Michael Green, Patrick Williams	39.42	

=== 4 x 400 meters relay ===
July 26

Rank	Nation	Competitors	Time	Notes
1st place, gold medalist(s)	United States	Clarence Daniel, Andrew Valmon, Antonio Pettigrew, Tim Simon	2:59.54	GR
2nd place, silver medalist(s)	Jamaica	Seymour Fagan, Devon Morris, Howard Burnett, Patrick O'Connor	3:00.45	
3rd place, bronze medalist(s)	Cuba	Juan Martínez, Félix Stevens, Héctor Herrera, Roberto Hernández	3:03.35	
4	Soviet Union	Aleksey Petukhov, Vladimir Prosin, Aivar Ojastu, Yevgeniy Lomtyev	3:04.64	

=== 20,000 meters walk ===
July 22

Rank	Name	Nationality	Time	Notes
1st place, gold medalist(s)	Ernesto Canto	Mexico	1:23:13.12	GR
2nd place, silver medalist(s)	Mikhail Shchennikov	Soviet Union	1:23:22.34	
3rd place, bronze medalist(s)	Bernd Gummelt	East Germany	1:23:29.61	
4	Nick A'Hern	Australia	1:23:49.90	
5	Simon Baker	Australia	1:23:57.04	
6	Grigory Kornev	Soviet Union	1:24:56.44	
7	Andrew Jachno	Australia	1:25:44.56	
8	Andrey Perlov	Soviet Union	1:25:51.90	
9	Guillaume LeBlanc	Canada	1:26:19.96	
10	Hartwig Gauder	East Germany	1:28:26.62	
11	Ronald Weigel	East Germany	1:28:56.45	
12	Martín Bermúdez	Mexico	1:29:36.56	
	Carlo Mattioli	Italy	DNF	
	Doug Fournier	United States	DNF	
	Sérgio Viera	Brazil	DNF	
	Tim Lewis	United States	DNF	
	Frants Kostyukevich	Soviet Union	DNF	
	Tim Barrett	Canada	DQ	
	Aleksander Pershin	Soviet Union	DQ	

=== High jump ===
July 26

Rank	Name	Nationality	2.24	2.27	2.30	2.33	2.40	Result	Notes
1st place, gold medalist(s)	Hollis Conway	United States			o	o	xxx	2.33	
2nd place, silver medalist(s)	Doug Nordquist	United States	o			x		2.30	
3rd place, bronze medalist(s)	Tony Barton	United States						2.30	
4	Sorin Matei	Romania				xxx		2.30	
5	Aleksey Yemelin	Soviet Union						2.27	
6	Sergey Dymchenko	Soviet Union						2.27	
7	Charles Austin	United States						2.27	
8	John Morris	United States						2.24	

=== Pole vault ===
July 22

Rank	Name	Nationality	5.37	5.57	5.72	5.77	5.81	5.87	5.92	6.08	Result	Notes
1st place, gold medalist(s)	Radion Gataullin	Soviet Union	–	–	o	–	o	–		xxx	5.92	
2nd place, silver medalist(s)	Grigoriy Yegorov	Soviet Union			o			xo			5.87	
3rd place, bronze medalist(s)	Tim Bright	United States				xo	x				5.77	
4	Kory Tarpenning	United States									5.72	
5	Scott Huffman	United States			o						5.72	
6	Maksim Tarasov	Soviet Union									5.57	
7	Igor Potapovich	Soviet Union									5.57	
8	Earl Bell	United States		xxx							5.37	
	Doug Wood	Canada									NM	

=== Long jump ===
July 25

Rank	Name	Nationality	#1	#2	#3	#4	#5	#6	Result	Notes
1st place, gold medalist(s)	Carl Lewis	United States	8.34w	x	8.38	8.34	?	8.31	8.38	
2nd place, silver medalist(s)	Mike Powell	United States	8.34w	8.06	8.30	8.22	x	x	8.34w	
3rd place, bronze medalist(s)	Robert Emmiyan	Soviet Union	8.03	8.23	x	x	7.93	8.07	8.23	
4	Llewellyn Starcks	United States	7.85	8.11	7.93	?	?	?	8.11	
5	Dion Bentley	United States	7.75	8.00	?	?	?	?	8.00	
6	Jaime Jefferson	Cuba	7.73	7.78	7.77	7.98	7.95	7.78	7.98	
7	Andre Ester	United States	7.68	?	?	7.78	?	7.96	7.96	
	Andrey Ignatov	Soviet Union							DNS	
	Luis Bueno	Cuba							DNS	

=== Triple jump ===
July 26

Rank	Name	Nationality	Result	Notes
1st place, gold medalist(s)	Kenny Harrison	United States	17.72	GR
2nd place, silver medalist(s)	Mike Conley	United States	17.48	
3rd place, bronze medalist(s)	Vladimir Inozemtsev	Soviet Union	17.06	
4	Igor Lapshin	Soviet Union	16.96	
5	Vasiliy Sokov	Soviet Union	16.68	
6	Edrick Floréal	Canada	16.64	
7	Gregorio Hernández	Cuba	16.58	
8	Charles Simpkins	United States	15.92	
	Benjamin Koech	Kenya	DNS	

=== Shot put ===
July 25

Rank	Name	Nationality	Result	Notes
1st place, gold medalist(s)	Randy Barnes	United States	21.44	
2nd place, silver medalist(s)	Jim Doehring	United States	21.12	
3rd place, bronze medalist(s)	Vyacheslav Lykho	Soviet Union	20.70	
4	Sergey Smirnov	Soviet Union	19.97	
5	Ron Backes	United States	19.66	
6	Art McDermott	United States	19.25	

=== Discus throw ===
July 23

Rank	Name	Nationality	Result	Notes
1st place, gold medalist(s)	Romas Ubartas	Soviet Union	67.14	GR
2nd place, silver medalist(s)	Kamy Keshmiri	United States	65.50	
3rd place, bronze medalist(s)	Mike Buncic	United States	62.06	
4	Ade Olukoju	Nigeria	62.02	
5	Sergey Lyakhov	Soviet Union	61.94	
6	Randy Heisler	United States	56.02	
	Knut Hjeltnes	Norway	DNS	
	Juan Martínez	Cuba	DNS	

=== Hammer throw ===
July 26

Rank	Name	Nationality	#1	#2	#3	#4	#5	#6	Result	Notes
1st place, gold medalist(s)	Igor Astapkovich	Soviet Union	x	82.52	84.12	x	84.04	83.34	84.12	
2nd place, silver medalist(s)	Andrey Abduvaliyev	Soviet Union	82.00	82.20	x	x	x	x	82.20	
3rd place, bronze medalist(s)	Igor Nikulin	Soviet Union	82.14	81.90	x	x	81.34	x	82.14	
4	Vasiliy Sidorenko	Soviet Union	77.40	78.94	78.28	79.02	x	77.80	79.02	
5	Lance Deal	United States	75.76	76.14	74.92	x	76.94	76.52	76.94	
6	Ken Flax	United States	x	76.12	x	73.74	74.22	74.80	76.12	
7	Jud Logan	United States	x	75.02	x	x	72.42	x	75.02	
8	Jim Driscoll	United States	x	69.48	69.48	68.66	70.68	x	70.68	

=== Javelin throw ===
July 24

Rank	Name	Nationality	Result	Notes
1st place, gold medalist(s)	Viktor Zaytsev	Soviet Union	84.16	GR
2nd place, silver medalist(s)	Ramon Gonzáles	Cuba	80.84	
3rd place, bronze medalist(s)	Masami Yoshida	Japan	77.36	
4	Marek Kaleta	Soviet Union	77.18	
5	Klaus Tafelmeier	West Germany	76.66	
6	Einar Vilhjálmsson	Iceland	76.26	
7	Dave Stephens	United States	73.28	
	Peter Schreiber	West Germany	DNS	
	Siggi Einarsson	Iceland	DNS	
	Vince Labosky	United States	DNS	

=== Decathlon ===
July 24–25

The highest mark recorded in each event is highlighted in yellow

Rank	Athlete	Nationality	100m	LJ	SP	HJ	400m	110m H	DT	PV	JT	1500m	Points	Notes
1st place, gold medalist(s)	Dave Johnson	United States	11.18	7.20	14.44	2.05	48.41	15.63	46.48	4.95	68.66	4:26.19	8403	GR
2nd place, silver medalist(s)	Dan O'Brien	United States	10.99	7.91	15.16	2.08	48.38	14.44	46.34	4.55	57.40	4:36.63	8358	
3rd place, bronze medalist(s)	Mikhail Medved	Soviet Union	11.21	7.23	15.62	2.05	50.17	14.68	49.60	5.05	62.62	4:35.54	8330	
4	Mike Smith	Canada	11.27	7.14	14.45	2.05	47.64	14.82	46.24	4.85	64.40	4:23.97	8298	
5	Roman Terekhov	Soviet Union	11.34	7.35	14.48	2.02	50.76	14.43	41.92	4.75	56.88	4:19.95	8005	
6	Sheldon Blockburger	United States	10.98	7.37	14.16	2.05	49.59	15.00	41.30	4.75	62.28	4:42.44	8002	
7	Andrei Nazarov	Soviet Union	11.27	7.33	12.99	2.08	48.81	14.53	41.04	4.95	55.58	4:33.17	7993	
8	Jay Thorson	United States	11.54	6.92	13.79	1.93	49.54	15.55	45.46	4.75	50.72	4:41.48	7494	
	Rišardas Malachovskis	Soviet Union	11.46	6.76	14.21	2.08	48.85	14.89	41.98	NM	DNS	–	DNF	
	Derek Huff	United States	11.19	7.15	13.66	1.96	50.37	15.25	41.00	DNS	–	–	DNF	

== Women's results ==
=== 100 meters ===
July 23
Wind: 0.0 m/s

Rank	Lane	Name	Nationality	Time	Notes
1st place, gold medalist(s)	6	Carlette Guidry	United States	11.03	
2nd place, silver medalist(s)	5	Sheila Echols	United States	11.05	
3rd place, bronze medalist(s)	7	Michelle Finn	United States	11.05	
4	3	Galina Malchugina	Soviet Union	11.24	
5	4	Evelyn Ashford	United States	11.24	
6	2	Irina Sergeyeva	Soviet Union	11.25	
7	8	Liliana Allen	Cuba	11.50	
8	1	Angela Bailey	Canada	11.57	

=== 200 meters ===
July 25

Rank	Name	Nationality	Time	Notes
1st place, gold medalist(s)	Dannette Young	United States	22.64	
2nd place, silver medalist(s)	Pauline Davis	Bahamas	22.88	
3rd place, bronze medalist(s)	Grace Jackson	Jamaica	22.96	
4	Michelle Finn	United States	23.00	
5	Galina Malchugina	Soviet Union	23.03	
6	Oksana Stepicheva	Soviet Union	23.10	
7	Yelena Bykova	Soviet Union	23.11	
8	Miriam Ferrer	Cuba	26.06	

=== 400 meters ===
July 22

Rank	Name	Nationality	Time	Notes
1st place, gold medalist(s)	Ana Fidelia Quirot	Cuba	50.34	
2nd place, silver medalist(s)	Lyudmila Dzhigalova	Soviet Union	51.38	
3rd place, bronze medalist(s)	Rochelle Stevens	United States	51.54	
4	Maicel Malone	United States	51.73	
5	Yelena Ruzina	Soviet Union	51.93	
6	Jillian Richardson	Canada	52.29	
7	Marina Shmonina	Soviet Union	52.40	
8	Lillie Leatherwood	United States	52.77	

=== 800 meters ===
July 23

Rank	Name	Nationality	Time	Notes
1st place, gold medalist(s)	Ana Fidelia Quirot	Cuba	1:57.42	GR
2nd place, silver medalist(s)	Liliya Nurutdinova	Soviet Union	1:57.52	
3rd place, bronze medalist(s)	Tatyana Grebenshuk	Soviet Union	1:58.21	
4	Charmaine Crooks	Canada	1:58.72	
5	Nadezhda Loboyko	Soviet Union	1:59.05	
6	Meredith Rainey	United States	2:00.45	
7	Celeste Halliday	United States	2:01.08	
8	Joetta Clark	United States	2:01.94	
9	Nadiya Olizarenko	Soviet Union	2:03.39	
	Julie Jenkins	United States	DQ	

=== 1500 meters ===
July 25

Rank	Name	Nationality	Time	Notes
1st place, gold medalist(s)	Natalya Artyomova	Soviet Union	4:09.48	
2nd place, silver medalist(s)	Yekaterina Podkopayeva	Soviet Union	4:09.91	
3rd place, bronze medalist(s)	PattiSue Plumer	United States	4:10.72	
4	Suzy Favor	United States	4:11.45	
5	Ravilya Kotovich	Soviet Union	4:11.54	
6	Robyn Meagher	Canada	4:13.74	
7	Leah Pells	Canada	4:14.78	
8	Linda Sheskey	United States	4:14.96	
	Doina Melinte	Romania	DNS	

=== 3000 meters ===
July 23

Rank	Name	Nationality	Time	Notes
1st place, gold medalist(s)	PattiSue Plumer	United States	8:51.59	
2nd place, silver medalist(s)	Yelena Romanova	Soviet Union	8:51.79	
3rd place, bronze medalist(s)	Lynn Jennings	United States	8:52.34	
4	Margareta Keszeg	Romania	8:52.66	
5	Ravilya Kotovich	Soviet Union	8:53.20	
6	Annette Peters	United States	8:56.89	
7	Mahomi Muranaka	Japan	9:12.50	
8	Trina Painter	United States	9:17.03	
9	María Luisa Servín	Mexico	9:27.28	
	Natalya Artyomova	Soviet Union	DNS	

=== 5000 meters ===
July 24

Rank	Name	Nationality	Time	Notes
1st place, gold medalist(s)	Yelena Romanova	Soviet Union	15:02.23	GR
2nd place, silver medalist(s)	Viorica Ghican	Romania	15:27.77	
3rd place, bronze medalist(s)	Sabrina Dornhoefer	United States	15:38.87	
4	Shelly Steely	United States	15:41.23	
5	Sammie Gdowski	United States	15:59.72	
6	Brenda Webb	United States	16:00.85	
7	Akemi Matsuno	Japan	16:04.34	
8	Valerie McGovern	Ireland	16:13.56	
9	Tamara Koba	Soviet Union	16:18.95	
10	Tashiro Miho	Japan	16:45.24	
	Aurora Cunha	Portugal	DNS	

=== 10,000 meters ===
July 26

Rank	Name	Nationality	Time	Notes
1st place, gold medalist(s)	Wanda Panfil	Poland	32:01.17	GR
2nd place, silver medalist(s)	Cathy O'Brien	United States	32:05.40	
3rd place, bronze medalist(s)	Olga Nazarkina	Soviet Union	32:05.76	
4	Yelena Tolstoguzova	Soviet Union	32:06.41	
5	Sylvia Mosqueda	United States	32:13.37	
6	Collette Murphy	United States	32:33.96	
7	María Luisa Servín	Mexico	32:55.22	
8	Carole Rouillard	Canada	33:09.37	
9	Carmen Díaz	Mexico	33:26.35	
	Aurora Cunha	Portugal	DNS	

=== Marathon ===
July 22

Rank	Name	Nationality	Time	Notes
1st place, gold medalist(s)	Zoya Ivanova	Soviet Union	2:34:37.50	
2nd place, silver medalist(s)	Irina Bogacheva	Soviet Union	2:36:24.70	
3rd place, bronze medalist(s)	Ramilya Barangulova	Soviet Union	2:37:40.70	
4	Lisa Kindelan	United States	2:42:05.50	
5	Tatyana Zuyeva	Soviet Union	2:45:58.80	
6	Leslie Lewis	United States	2:51:13.30	
7	Rosa Gutierrez	United States	2:57:43.50	
8	Debra Medina	Colombia	3:01:04.00	

=== 100 meters hurdles ===
July 23

Rank	Name	Nationality	Time	Notes
1st place, gold medalist(s)	Natalya Grigoryeva	Soviet Union	12.70	
2nd place, silver medalist(s)	Lyudmila Narozhilenko	Soviet Union	12.88	
3rd place, bronze medalist(s)	LaVonna Martin	United States	12.89	
4	Lidiya Yurkova	Soviet Union	12.92	
5	Aliuska López	Cuba	12.99	
6	Candy Young	United States	13.11	
7	Lynda Tolbert	United States	13.14	
8	Mihaela Pogăcean	Romania	13.17	

=== 400 meters hurdles ===
July 26

Rank	Lane	Name	Nationality	Time	Notes
1st place, gold medalist(s)	4	Sandra Farmer-Patrick	United States	55.16	
2nd place, silver medalist(s)	3	Schowonda Williams	United States	55.65	
3rd place, bronze medalist(s)	7	Lyudmila Khodosevich	Soviet Union	57.33	
4	6	Kathy Freeman	United States	57.71	
5	2	Vera Ordina	Soviet Union	57.94	
	5	Janeene Vickers	United States	DQ	
	8	Victoria Fulcher	United States	DQ	
	1	Petra Krug	East Germany	DNS	

=== 4 x 100 meters relay ===
July 26

Rank	Lane	Nation	Competitors	Time	Notes
1st place, gold medalist(s)	4	United States	Carlette Guidry, Sheila Echols, Michelle Finn, Evelyn Ashford	42.46	
2nd place, silver medalist(s)	5	Soviet Union	Yelena Bykova, Galina Malchugina, Natalya Kovtun, Irina Sergeyeva	42.67	
3rd place, bronze medalist(s)	6	Jamaica	Michelle Freeman, Juliet Campbell, Layphane Carnegie, Ethlyn Tate	44.12	
4	3	Cuba	Miriam Ferrer, Aliuska López, Odalys Adams, Liliana Allen	44.35	

=== 4 x 400 meters relay ===
July 26

Rank	Nation	Competitors	Time	Notes
1st place, gold medalist(s)	Soviet Union "A"	Yelena Vinogradova, Marina Shmonina, Yelena Ruzina, Lyudmila Dzhigalova	3:23.70	
2nd place, silver medalist(s)	United States	Natasha Kaiser, Rochelle Stevens, Lillie Leatherwood, Maicel Malone	3:24.53	
3rd place, bronze medalist(s)	Soviet Union "B"	Nadezhda Loboyko, Tatyana Grebenchuk, Nadiya Olizarenko, Liliya Nurutdinova	3:30.60	
4	Jamaica	Cathy Rattray-Williams, Vivienne Spence, Andrea Thomas, Juliet Campbell	3:33.11	

=== 10,000 meters walk ===
July 24

Rank	Name	Nationality	Time	Notes
1st place, gold medalist(s)	Nadezhda Ryashkina	Soviet Union	41:56.21	WR, GR
2nd place, silver medalist(s)	Kerry Saxby	Australia	41:57.22	
3rd place, bronze medalist(s)	Beate Anders	East Germany	42:48.51	
4	Olga Kardapoltseva	Soviet Union	43:38.01	
5	Olga Krishtop	Soviet Union	45:28.11	
6	Pascale Grand	Canada	46:23.80	
7	Debbi Lawrence	United States	46:31.71	
8	Teresa Vaill	United States	49:43.00	

=== High jump ===
July 23

Rank	Name	Nationality	Result	Notes
1st place, gold medalist(s)	Yelena Yelesina	Soviet Union	2.02	PB
2nd place, silver medalist(s)	Yolanda Henry	United States	1.92	
3rd place, bronze medalist(s)	Megumi Sato	Japan	1.89	
4	Vicki Borsheim	United States	1.89	
5	Jan Wohlschlag	United States	1.89	
6	Niki Gavera	Greece	1.86	
7	Phyllis Bluntson	United States	1.86	
	Tamara Bykova	Soviet Union	DQ	

=== Long jump ===
July 24

Rank	Name	Nationality	Result	Notes
1st place, gold medalist(s)	Inessa Kravets	Soviet Union	6.93	
2nd place, silver medalist(s)	Larisa Berezhnaya	Soviet Union	6.61	
3rd place, bronze medalist(s)	Sheila Echols	United States	6.51	
4	Cindy Greiner	United States	6.49	
5	Jennifer Inniss	United States	6.26	
6	Sheila Hudson	United States	6.14	
7	Gwen Loud	United States	6.09	

=== Shot put ===
July 24

Rank	Name	Nationality	Result	Notes
1st place, gold medalist(s)	Natalya Lisovskaya	Soviet Union	20.60	
2nd place, silver medalist(s)	Huang Zhihong	China	20.50	
3rd place, bronze medalist(s)	Belsis Laza	Cuba	18.98	
4	Marina Antonyuk	Soviet Union	18.92	
5	Larisa Peleshenko	Soviet Union	18.67	
6	Ramona Pagel	United States	18.37	
7	Connie Price	United States	18.24	
	Claudia Losch	West Germany	DNS	

=== Discus throw ===
July 22

Rank	Name	Nationality	Result	Notes
1st place, gold medalist(s)	Ilke Wyludda	East Germany	68.08	
2nd place, silver medalist(s)	Irina Yatchenko	Soviet Union	67.04	
3rd place, bronze medalist(s)	Olga Burova	Soviet Union	65.46	
4	Maritza Martén	Cuba	64.90	
5	Hilda Ramos	Cuba	63.92	
6	Hou Xuemei	China	62.92	
7	Lacy Barnes	United States	57.84	
8	Connie Price	United States	57.24	
	Yelena Zvereva	Soviet Union	NM	

=== Javelin throw ===
July 25

Rank	Name	Nationality	Result	Notes
1st place, gold medalist(s)	Natalya Shikolenko	Soviet Union	61.62	
2nd place, silver medalist(s)	Tatyana Shikolenko	Soviet Union	59.06	
3rd place, bronze medalist(s)	Karin Smith	United States	58.94	
4	Donna Mayhew	United States	58.62	
5	Laverne Eve	Bahamas	56.84	
6	Marilyn Senz	United States	56.04	
	Petra Felke	East Germany	DNS	
	Isel López	Cuba	DNS	

=== Heptathlon ===
July 22–23

The highest mark recorded in each event is highlighted in yellow

Rank	Athlete	Nationality	100m H	HJ	SP	200m	LJ	JT	800m	Points	Notes
1st place, gold medalist(s)	Jackie Joyner	United States	12.79	1.87	13.93	24.26	6.91	47.64	2:17.41	6783	
2nd place, silver medalist(s)	Svetlana Zinina	Soviet Union	13.72	1.75	13.63	25.09	6.36	44.80	2:19.96	6128	
3rd place, bronze medalist(s)	Gea Johnson	United States	13.83	1.78	14.18	25.26	6.11	37.60	2:19.25	5963	
	Cindy Greiner	United States	13.87	1.75	13.77	25.30	6.13	DNS	–	DNF	
	Irina Belova	Soviet Union	13.84	1.81	12.44	24.65	DNS	–	–	DNF	
	Liliana Năstase	Romania	13.16	1.72	11.61	25.07	DNS	–	–	DNF	
	Larisa Nikitina	Soviet Union	~~14.00~~	~~1.84~~	~~15.49~~	~~25.66~~	~~6.21~~	~~48.84~~	~~2:25.14~~	DQ	
