= 1991 World Championships in Athletics – Men's 200 metres =

Men's 200 metres at the 1991 World Championships
- Venue: Olympic Stadium
- Dates: 26 August (heats and quarter-finals); 27 August (semi-finals and final)
- Competitors: 61
- Winning time: 20.01 CR

Medalists
gold medal	Michael Johnson	United States
silver medal	Frankie Fredericks	Namibia
bronze medal	Atlee Mahorn	Canada

These are the official results of the Men's 200 metres event at the 1991 IAAF World Championships in Tokyo, Japan. There were a total of 61 participating athletes, with eight qualifying heats and the final held on Tuesday 27 August 1991.

== Medalists ==
Gold	Michael Johnson; United States (USA)
Silver	Frankie Fredericks; Namibia (NAM)
Bronze	Atlee Mahorn; Canada (CAN)

== Schedule ==
- All times are Japan Standard Time (UTC+9)

Heats
26.08.1991 – 11:35h
Quarterfinals
26.08.1991 – 16:50h
Semifinals
27.08.1991 – 16:25h
Final
27.08.1991 – 19:10h

== Records ==
Existing records at the start of the event.

World Record	Pietro Mennea (ITA)	19.72	Mexico City, Mexico	September 12, 1972
Championship Record	Calvin Smith (USA)	20.14	Helsinki, Finland	August 14, 1983

== Final ==
RANK	FINAL	TIME
	Michael Johnson (USA)	20.01
	Frankie Fredericks (NAM)	20.34
	Atlee Mahorn (CAN)	20.49
4.	Robson Caetano da Silva (BRA)	20.49
5.	Olapade Adeniken (NGR)	20.51
6.	Jean-Charles Trouabal (FRA)	20.58
7.	Nikolay Antonov (BUL)	20.59
8.	Aleksandr Sokolov (URS)	20.78

== Semifinals ==
- Held on 1991-08-27

RANK	HEAT 1	TIME
1.	Atlee Mahorn (CAN)	20.40
2.	Nikolay Antonov (BUL)	20.43
3.	Jean-Charles Trouabal (FRA)	20.48
4.	Aleksandr Sokolov (URS)	20.48
5.	Floyd Heard (USA)	20.61
6.	Linford Christie (GBR)	20.62
7.	Daniel Effiong (NGR)	20.85
8.	Joseph Gikonyo (KEN)	21.01

RANK	HEAT 2	TIME
1.	Michael Johnson (USA)	20.06
2.	Frankie Fredericks (NAM)	20.27
3.	Olapade Adeniken (NGR)	20.47
4.	Robson Caetano da Silva (BRA)	20.47
5.	John Regis (GBR)	20.52
6.	Michael Rosswess (GBR)	20.82
7.	Emmanuel Tuffour (GHA)	20.91
8.	Bruno Marie-Rose (FRA)	21.04

== Quarterfinals ==
- Held on Monday 1991-08-26

RANK	HEAT 1	TIME
1.	Atlee Mahorn (CAN)	20.17
2.	Robson Caetano da Silva (BRA)	20.18
3.	Floyd Heard (USA)	20.56
4.	Daniel Effiong (NGR)	20.59
5.	Hermann Lomba (FRA)	20.69
6.	Jarosław Kaniecki (POL)	20.82
7.	Thomas Renner (AUT)	21.11
8.	Enrique Talavera (ESP)	21.12

RANK	HEAT 2	TIME
1.	Frankie Fredericks (NAM)	20.41
2.	Emmanuel Tuffour (GHA)	20.58
3.	Michael Rosswess (GBR)	20.61
4.	Bruno Marie-Rose (FRA)	20.85
5.	Dmitriy Bartenyev (URS)	20.90
6.	Kennedy Ondiek (KEN)	21.07
7.	Félix Stevens (CUB)	21.09
—	Innocent Asonze (NGR)	DSQ

RANK	HEAT 3	TIME
1.	Michael Johnson (USA)	20.05
2.	Nikolay Antonov (BUL)	20.20
3.	Olapade Adeniken (NGR)	20.30
4.	John Regis (GBR)	20.38
5.	Dean Capobianco (AUS)	20.77
6.	Daniel Cojocaru (ROM)	20.80
7.	Stefano Tilli (ITA)	20.92
8.	Cyprian Enweani (CAN)	21.09

RANK	HEAT 4	TIME
1.	Aleksandr Sokolov (URS)	20.36
2.	Jean-Charles Trouabal (FRA)	20.40
3.	Linford Christie (GBR)	20.54
4.	Joseph Gikonyo (KEN)	20.63
5.	Yoshiyuki Okuyama (JPN)	21.00
6.	Leroy Burrell (USA)	21.21
7.	Pascal Thurnherr (SUI)	21.23
8.	Cameron Taylor (NZL)	21.40

== Qualifying heats ==
- Held on Monday 1991-08-26

RANK	HEAT 1	TIME
1.	Frank Fredericks (NAM)	20.70
2.	Innocent Asonze (NGR)	20.88
3.	Jarosław Kaniecki (POL)	21.00
4.	Anninos Markoullides (CYP)	21.07
5.	Attila Kovács (HUN)	21.55
6.	Christian Mandengue (CMR)	22.31
7.	Ahmed Shageef (MDV)	22.80

RANK	HEAT 2	TIME
1.	Michael Johnson (USA)	20.52
2.	Yoshiyuki Okuyama (JPN)	20.80
3.	Stefano Tilli (ITA)	20.89
4.	Enrique Talavera (ESP)	20.98
5.	Peter Ogilvie (CAN)	21.09
6.	Trevor Davis (AIA)	21.87
	Mohamed Abderrehin (LBA)	DNS

RANK	HEAT 3	TIME
1.	Robson Caetano da Silva (BRA)	20.51
2.	Michael Rosswess (GBR)	20.58
3.	Daniel Effiong (NGR)	20.68
4.	Kennedy Ondiek (KEN)	20.73
5.	Dmitriy Bartenyev (URS)	20.78
6.	Edmund Estaphane (LCA)	21.48
7.	Eric Haynes (SKN)	21.58
8.	Fortune Ogouchi (BEN)	22.36

RANK	HEAT 4	TIME
1.	Nikolay Antonov (BUL)	20.28
2.	Leroy Burrell (USA)	20.38
3.	Joseph Gikonyo (KEN)	20.43
4.	Cyprian Enweani (CAN)	20.95
5.	Pascal Thurnherr (SUI)	20.97
6.	Dudley Den Dulk (AHO)	21.65
7.	Rodney Cox (TCA)	21.91
	Karim Abdul (AFG)	DNS

RANK	HEAT 5	TIME
1.	Olapade Adeniken (NGR)	20.63
2.	Hermann Lomba (FRA)	20.78
3.	Linford Christie (GBR)	21.19
4.	Khalid Juma (BHR)	21.31
5.	Joseph Styles (BAH)	21.43
6.	Joseph Dias (SEN)	21.60
7.	Mark Sherwin (COK)	22.68
	Golam Ambia (BAN)	DQ

RANK	HEAT 6	TIME
1.	Jean-Charles Trouabal (FRA)	20.75
2.	Atlee Mahorn (CAN)	20.83
3.	Dean Capobianco (AUS)	20.93
4.	Daniel Cojocaru (ROM)	20.94
5.	Menelik Lawson (TOG)	21.09
6.	Sandro Floris (ITA)	21.10
7.	Ousmane Diarra (MLI)	21.85
8.	Jerome Jeremiah (VAN)	21.91

RANK	HEAT 7	TIME
1.	Emmanuel Tuffour (GHA)	20.50
2.	John Regis (GBR)	20.62
3.	Aleksandr Sokolov (URS)	20.67
4.	Thomas Renner (AUT)	20.85
5.	Botlhoko Shebe (LES)	21.84
	Troy Douglas (BER)	DQ
	Franck Zio (BUR)	DNS

RANK	HEAT 8	TIME
1.	Floyd Heard (USA)	20.67
2.	Marie-Rose Bruno (FRA)	20.90
3.	Cameron Taylor (NZL)	21.06
3.	Félix Stevens (CUB)	21.06
5.	Miguel Angel Gomez (ESP)	21.08
6.	Neville Hodge (ISV)	21.36
7.	Eswort Coombs (VIN)	22.29
8.	Manuel Alves Fonseca (STP)	23.44

== See also ==
- 1988 Men's Olympic 200 metres (Seoul)
- 1990 Men's European Championships 200 metres (Split)
- 1992 Men's Olympic 200 metres (Barcelona)
- 1993 Men's World Championships 200 metres (Stuttgart)
