= Athletics at the 1989 Summer Universiade – Men's 200 metres =

The men's 200 metres event at the 1989 Summer Universiade was held at the Wedaustadion in Duisburg with the final on 27 and 28 August 1989.

== Medalists ==
Gold	Silver	Bronze
Robson da Silva; Brazil	Félix Stevens; Cuba	Kevin Braunskill; United States

== Results ==
=== Heats ===
Wind:
Heat 1: +1.6 m/s, Heat 2: +1.1 m/s, Heat 3: +1.1 m/s, Heat 4: +2.8 m/s, Heat 5: +1.5 m/s, Heat 6: +3.2 m/s, Heat 7: +2.2 m/s, Heat 8: +0.7 m/s

Rank	Heat	Athlete	Nationality	Time	Notes
1	3	Félix Stevens	Cuba	20.64	Q
2	7	Robson da Silva	Brazil	20.70	Q
3	3	Kevin Braunskill	United States	20.74	Q
4	5	Cyprian Enweani	Canada	20.75	Q
5	6	Kevin Little	United States	20.79	Q
6	6	Nigel Will	Great Britain	21.01	Q
7	8	Jeroen Fischer	Belgium	21.02	Q
8	7	Andrey Fedoriv	Soviet Union	21.13	Q
9	5	Yoshiyuki Okuyama	Japan	21.16	Q
10	6	Patrick Stevens	Belgium	21.18	Q
11	4	Gabriel Tiacoh	Ivory Coast	21.20	Q
12	4	Giovanni Puggioni	Italy	21.23	Q
13	1	Jean-Charles Trouabal	France	21.25	Q
14	5	Georgios Panagiotopoulos	Greece	21.26	Q
15	1	Patrick O'Connor	Jamaica	21.31	Q
16	6	Tamás Molnar	Hungary	21.32	q
17	7	Slobodan Branković	Yugoslavia	21.33	Q
18	5	Alain Reimann	Switzerland	21.37	q
19	8	René Mangold	Switzerland	21.39	Q
20	3	Rob van de Klundert	Netherlands	21.41	Q
20	7	Hiroki Fuwa	Japan	21.41	q
22	1	Aleksandr Lysenko	Soviet Union	21.43	Q
23	1	Zhao Cunlin	China	21.45	q
24	3	Mark Henrich	West Germany	21.53	q
25	8	Raymundo Escalante	Mexico	21.53	Q
26	7	Volker Westhagemann	West Germany	21.56	q
27	3	Luís Cunha	Portugal	21.62	q
28	4	Howard Davis	Jamaica	21.63	Q
28	6	Benyoucef Aissa Khelifa	Algeria	21.63	q
30	8	György Fetter	Hungary	21.66	
31	1	Hsien Tzong-tze	Chinese Taipei	21.68	
32	4	Manuel Moreno	Spain	21.69	
33	7	Ousmane Diarra	Mali	21.73	
34	2	Nikolay Antonov	Bulgaria	21.75	Q
35	5	Aboubakry Dia	Senegal	21.77	
36	4	Ayhan Bodur	Turkey	21.81	
37	2	José Bernardo Muñoz	Spain	21.92	Q
38	3	Nigel Watson	Ireland	21.94	
39	3	Lin Chin-hsiung	Chinese Taipei	21.95	
40	2	Itai Iluz	Israel	22.04	Q
41	5	Nicos Adamou	Cyprus	22.17	
42	4	Darren Bernard	Great Britain	22.21	
43	4	Hoang Cu	Vietnam	22.43	
44	4	Hau Yiu Chung	Hong Kong	22.45	
45	6	Michael Ojok	Uganda	22.46	
46	2	Óscar Fernández	Peru	22.57	
47	2	Samuel Kabiswa Magembe	Uganda	22.62	
48	5	Montri Kumpirom	Thailand	22.68	
49	8	Cheung Shiu Sun	Hong Kong	22.81	
50	3	Tawel Camara Sankoumba	Guinea	22.89	
51	7	Edmund Chehura	Zimbabwe	23.03	
52	8	Bringle Kgabanyane	Botswana	23.06	
53	1	Robert Loua	Guinea	23.68	
54	1	Fidelis Humba	Tanzania	24.56	

=== Quarterfinals ===
Wind:
Heat 1: +1.2 m/s, Heat 2: +0.9 m/s, Heat 3: +1.6 m/s, Heat 4: +0.8 m/s

Rank	Heat	Athlete	Nationality	Time	Notes
1	2	Robson da Silva	Brazil	20.51	Q
2	1	Cyprian Enweani	Canada	20.64	Q
3	3	Kevin Braunskill	United States	20.68	Q
4	1	Jean-Charles Trouabal	France	20.73	Q
5	1	Kevin Little	United States	20.76	Q
5	4	Félix Stevens	Cuba	20.76	Q
7	2	Nigel Will	Great Britain	20.91	Q
8	3	Gabriel Tiacoh	Ivory Coast	20.97	Q
9	4	Andrey Fedoriv	Soviet Union	20.98	Q
10	3	Georgios Panagiotopoulos	Greece	20.99	Q
11	2	Patrick Stevens	Belgium	21.00	Q
12	3	Nikolay Antonov	Bulgaria	21.01	q
13	1	Zhao Cunlin	China	21.02	q
13	2	Patrick O'Connor	Jamaica	21.02	q
15	3	Jeroen Fischer	Belgium	21.06	q
16	4	Yoshiyuki Okuyama	Japan	21.11	Q
17	1	Giovanni Puggioni	Italy	21.12	
18	3	Hiroki Fuwa	Japan	21.16	
19	3	Volker Westhagemann	West Germany	21.17	
20	3	Aleksandr Lysenko	Soviet Union	21.17	
21	2	Alain Reimann	Switzerland	21.29	
22	2	Luís Cunha	Portugal	21.37	
23	4	Slobodan Branković	Yugoslavia	21.42	
24	2	Rob van de Klundert	Netherlands	21.52	
25	4	René Mangold	Switzerland	21.53	
26	1	Mark Henrich	West Germany	21.58	
27	1	Raymundo Escalante	Mexico	21.59	
28	2	José Bernardo Muñoz	Spain	21.63	
29	4	Benyoucef Aissa Khelifa	Algeria	21.74	
30	1	Howard Davis	Jamaica	21.75	
	4	Tamás Molnar	Hungary	?	
	4	Itai Iluz	Israel	?	

=== Semifinals ===
Wind:
Heat 1: +1.3 m/s, Heat 2: +1.9 m/s

Rank	Heat	Athlete	Nationality	Time	Notes
1	2	Félix Stevens	Cuba	20.59	Q
2	2	Cyprian Enweani	Canada	20.71	Q
3	1	Robson da Silva	Brazil	20.73	Q
4	2	Kevin Braunskill	United States	20.87	Q
5	1	Jean-Charles Trouabal	France	20.90	Q
6	2	Yoshiyuki Okuyama	Japan	20.99	Q
7	2	Patrick Stevens	Belgium	21.02	
8	1	Kevin Little	United States	21.06	Q
9	2	Nigel Will	Great Britain	21.08	
10	1	Gabriel Tiacoh	Ivory Coast	21.16	Q
11	1	Andrey Fedoriv	Soviet Union	21.22	
11	2	Georgios Panagiotopoulos	Greece	21.22	
13	1	Nikolay Antonov	Bulgaria	21.23	
14	1	Jeroen Fischer	Belgium	21.36	
15	1	Zhao Cunlin	China	21.39	
16	2	Patrick O'Connor	Jamaica	21.51	

=== Final ===
Wind: +3.4 m/s

Rank	Athlete	Nationality	Time	Notes
1st place, gold medalist(s)	Robson da Silva	Brazil	20.33	
2nd place, silver medalist(s)	Félix Stevens	Cuba	20.58	
3rd place, bronze medalist(s)	Kevin Braunskill	United States	20.62	
4	Jean-Charles Trouabal	France	20.68	
5	Cyprian Enweani	Canada	20.77	
6	Kevin Little	United States	20.83	
7	Yoshiyuki Okuyama	Japan	20.85	
	Gabriel Tiacoh	Ivory Coast	DNS	
