= Wallace Spearmon Sr. =

American sprinter

Personal information
- Born: September 3, 1962 (age 63)

Sport
- Sport: Track and field
Medal record
Representing United States
Summer Universiade
Gold medal – first place	1987 Zagreb	200 m
Gold medal – first place	1987 Zagreb	4×100 m relay
Goodwill Games
Bronze medal – third place	1986 Moscow	200 m
Pan American Games
Bronze medal – third place	1987 Indianapolis	200 m

Wallace Spearmon Sr. (born September 3, 1962) is an American former sprinter. He is the father of Wallace Spearmon Jr.

He attended the University of Arkansas and competed collegiately for the Arkansas Razorbacks under coach John McDonnell. While there he became a two-time All-American at the NCAA Men's Outdoor Track and Field Championships and helped the team to the overall title in 1985. He set bests of 10.23 seconds for the 100-meter dash and 20.36 seconds for the 200-meter dash while at Arkansas. At the 1985 Penn Relays meet, he was the anchor leg for the 4×100-meter relay and 4×200-meter relay and took the Arkansas Razorbacks to their first titles in those events at the carnival, in its then 90-year history.

Spearmon represented his country internationally over 200 m several times. His first international medal came at the 1986 Goodwill Games, where he was a bronze medallist close behind fellow American Dwayne Evans, making it a sweep for the United States as Floyd Heard topped the podium. A year later he won two gold medals at the 1987 Summer Universiade in Zagreb. First, he defeated Heard to win the 200 m title, and then the pair teamed up with Lee McRae and Lorenzo Daniel to secure the 4×100 m gold medals. The relay win was the start of a long winning streak for the United States in that event, which lasted until 2001.

Returning to the United States, he was chosen for the team for the 1987 Pan American Games held in Indianapolis. A run of 20.53 seconds brought him the 200 m bronze medal, with Heard and Brazil's Robson Caetano da Silva getting the better of him. That year he set a personal best of 20.27 seconds for the 200 m in Rhede, Germany. He competed for his nation at the global level, reaching the 200 m semi-finals at the 1987 World Championships in Athletics.

He had a son – Wallace Spearmon Jr. – in 1984 and encouraged him to also take up track sprinting. He coached his son for a long period and continued on as mentor. His son ultimately bettered his father's achievements by winning three individual medals and a relay gold at the World Championships in Athletics, in addition to a national record indoors in the 200 m.
