= Athletics at the 1987 Summer Universiade – Women's 5000 metres walk =

The women's 5000 metres walk event at the 1987 Summer Universiade was held in Zagreb on 18 July 1987.

== Results ==
Rank	Athlete	Nationality	Time	Notes
1st place, gold medalist(s)	Li Sujie	China	21:51.50	
2nd place, silver medalist(s)	Yelena Rodionova	Soviet Union	22:00.01	
3rd place, bronze medalist(s)	Ann Peel	Canada	22:01.09	
4	Svetlana Kaburkina	Soviet Union	22:13.09	
5	Mirva Hamalainen	Finland	22:28.21	
6	Alison Baker	Canada	22:56.92	
7	Lisa Langford	Great Britain	23:01.73	
8	Lynn Weik	United States	23:43.38	
9	Rosa Sierra	Spain	23:52.88	
10	Sara Standley	United States	24:40.59	
	Chen Yueling	China	DQ	
