= Edgardo Guilbe =

Puerto Rican sprinter (born 1966)

Edgardo Guilbe Alomar
Personal information
- Nationality: Puerto Rican
- Born: 18 March 1966 (age 60) Ponce, Puerto Rico
Medal record
Representing Puerto Rico
Summer Universiade
Bronze medal – third place	1987 Zagreb	200m
Central American and Caribbean Games
Silver medal – second place	1990 Mexico City	200m
Silver medal – second place	1990 Mexico City	4x100m relay
Silver medal – second place	1993 Ponce	4x100m relay

Edgardo Guilbe Alomar (born 18 March 1966) is a Puerto Rican former sprinter who specialized in the 200 metres. His personal best time was 20.53 seconds, achieved in July 1989 in San Juan.

He won the gold medal at the 1989 Central American and Caribbean Championships and silver medals at the 1990 Central American and Caribbean Games and the 1993 Central American and Caribbean Championships. He also competed at the 1988 Olympic Games and the 1993 World Championships without reaching the final.

In 2018, Edgardo Guilbe was credited with running a 21.95 200 meters and a 49.68 400 meters (even though he had not previously had a history of running this event). Those marks would have been significant improvements on Masters world records for a 52-year-old man. Subsequently, it has been discovered those marks were produced by Edgardo Guilbe Correa, his son.

== International competitions ==
Year	Competition	Venue	Position	Event	Notes
Representing Puerto Rico
1986	Central American and Caribbean Games	Santiago de los Caballeros, Dominican Republic	11th (sf)	200 m	21.42
1986	Central American and Caribbean Games	Santiago de los Caballeros, Dominican Republic	4th	4 × 100 m relay	39.61
1987	Universiade	Zagreb, Yugoslavia	3rd	200 m	20.92
1987	Pan American Games	Indianapolis, United States	6th	200 m	21.10
1988	Olympic Games	Seoul, South Korea	14th (sf)	200 m	20.73
1988	Ibero-American Championships	Mexico City, Mexico	5th	200 m	20.52 A
1988	Ibero-American Championships	Mexico City, Mexico	5th	4 × 100 m relay	40.10 A
1989	Central American and Caribbean Championships	San Juan, Puerto Rico	1st	200 m	20.53
1990	Central American and Caribbean Games	Mexico City, Mexico	2nd	200 m	20.79
1990	Central American and Caribbean Games	Mexico City, Mexico	2nd	4 × 100 m relay	40.01
1991	Pan American Games	Havana, Cuba	14th (h)	200 m	21.64
1992	Olympic Games	Barcelona, Spain	3rd (heats)	200 m	21.75
1993	Central American and Caribbean Championships Championships	Cali, Colombia	2nd	200 m	20.86
1993	Central American and Caribbean Games	Ponce, Puerto Rico	4th	200 m	20.59
1993	Central American and Caribbean Games	Ponce, Puerto Rico	2nd	4 × 100 m relay	40.01
1993	World Championships	Stuttgart, Germany	5th (heats)	200 m	21.14
1997	Central American and Caribbean Championships	San Juan, Puerto Rico	4th	200 m	20.99
