= Carlos Bernardo Moreno =

Chilean sprinter

Personal information
- Born: 28 October 1967 (age 58)

Sport
- Sport: Track and field
Medal record
Representing Chile
South American Games
Silver medal – second place	1990 Lima	4x100m relay

Carlos Bernardo Moreno Lira (born 28 October 1967) is a Chilean retired track and field sprinter. He represented his native country at the 1988 Summer Olympics in Seoul, South Korea.

== International competitions ==
Year	Competition	Venue	Position	Event	Notes
Representing Chile
1985	South American Championships	Santiago, Chile	2nd	4 × 100 m relay	40.69
1986	World Junior Championships	Athens, Greece	44th (h)	100 m	10.98 (wind: +1.1 m/s)
1986	World Junior Championships	Athens, Greece	48th (h)	200 m	22.32 (wind: -0.2 m/s)
1987	Pan American Games	Indianapolis, United States	13th (sf)	100 m	10.37
1987	Pan American Games	Indianapolis, United States	13th (sf)	200 m	21.78
1987	South American Championships	São Paulo, Brazil	2nd	100 m	10.51
1987	South American Championships	São Paulo, Brazil	2nd	200 m	21.41
1988	Ibero-American Championships	Mexico City, Mexico	7th	100 m	10.52 (wind: +1.2 m/s) A
1988	Ibero-American Championships	Mexico City, Mexico	8th	200 m	21.55 (wind: -0.3 m/s) A
1988	Ibero-American Championships	Mexico City, Mexico	4th	4 × 400 m relay	3:08.50 A
1989	South American Championships	Medellín, Colombia	7th	100 m	10.6
1989	South American Championships	Medellín, Colombia	5th	200 m	21.74
1989	South American Championships	Medellín, Colombia	5th	4 × 100 m relay	41.66
1990	Ibero-American Championships	Manaus, Brazil	4th	100 m	10.47 (wind: +1.2 m/s)
1990	South American Games	Lima, Peru	5th	100 m	10.94
1990	South American Games	Lima, Peru	2nd	4 × 100 m relay	41.3
1991	South American Championships	Manaus, Brazil	3rd	100 m	10.44
1991	South American Championships	Manaus, Brazil	4th	200 m	21.19
1991	South American Championships	Manaus, Brazil	2nd	4 × 100 m relay	40.61
1991	Pan American Games	Havana, Cuba	10th (h)	100 m	10.66
1991	Pan American Games	Havana, Cuba	12th (h)	200 m	21.36
1992	Ibero-American Championships	Seville, Spain	4th (h)	100 m	10.68 (wind: -1.4 m/s)
1992	Ibero-American Championships	Seville, Spain	4th (h)	200 m	21.79 (wind: +0.8 m/s)
1993	South American Championships	Lima, Peru	4th	100 m	10.92
1993	South American Championships	Lima, Peru	4th	200 m	21.4
1993	South American Championships	Lima, Peru	1st	4 × 100 m relay	40.20
1994	Ibero-American Championships	Mar del Plata, Argentina	5th	100 m	10.60 w (wind: +3.2 m/s)
1994	Ibero-American Championships	Mar del Plata, Argentina	4th (h)	200 m	21.80 (wind: -1.5 m/s)
1994	Ibero-American Championships	Mar del Plata, Argentina	—	4 × 100 m relay	DNF
1994	Ibero-American Championships	Mar del Plata, Argentina	4th	4 × 400 m relay	3:08.27
1994	South American Games	Valencia, Venezuela	4th	100 m	10.56
1994	South American Games	Valencia, Venezuela	4th	200 m	21.0
1997	South American Championships	Mar del Plata, Argentina	4th	100 m	10.54
1997	South American Championships	Mar del Plata, Argentina	5th	200 m	21.67
1997	South American Championships	Mar del Plata, Argentina	2nd	4 × 100 m relay	40.08
1997	South American Championships	Mar del Plata, Argentina	2nd	4 × 400 m relay	3:07.98
