= Yelena Vinogradova =

Soviet sprinter

Personal information
- Born: 28 March 1964 (age 62) Novosibirsk, Soviet Union

Sport
- Sport: Track and field
Medal record
Representing Soviet Union
World Championships
Silver medal – second place	1991 Tokyo	4x100 m relay
European Championships
Silver medal – second place	1990 Split	4×400 m relay
Summer Universiade
Silver medal – second place	1985 Kobe	4x400 m relay
Silver medal – second place	1987 Zagreb	4x100 m relay
Silver medal – second place	1987 Zagreb	4x400 m relay
Bronze medal – third place	1989 Duisburg	4x400 m relay

Yelena Vinogradova (Russian: Елена Виноградова, born 28 March 1964) is a female track and field athlete who represented the Soviet Union. She specialized in the 200 metres and often ran relay races, winning the silver medal in the 4 × 100 metres relay and placing eighth in the 200 m at the 1991 World Championships. She won a gold medal in the women's 4 × 400 metres relay at the 1990 Goodwill Games.

== International competitions ==
Year	Competition	Venue	Position	Notes
Representing Soviet Union
1990	European Championships	Split, Yugoslavia	2nd	4 × 400 m relay
1990	Goodwill Games	Seattle, United States	1st	4 × 400 m relay
1991	World Championships	Tokyo, Japan	8th	200 m
1991	World Championships	Tokyo, Japan	2nd	4 × 100 m relay
