= Athletics at the 1991 Pan American Games – Men's 200 metres =

Men's 200 metres at the Pan American Games

The men's 200 metres event at the 1991 Pan American Games was held in Havana, Cuba with the final on 7 and 8 August.

== Medalists ==
Gold	Silver	Bronze
Robson da Silva; Brazil	Kevin Little; United States	Félix Stevens; Cuba

== Results ==
=== Heats ===
Wind:
Heat 1: +1.7 m/s, Heat 2: +0.4 m/s, Heat 3: +1.1 m/s

Rank	Heat	Name	Nationality	Time	Notes
1	1	Robson da Silva	Brazil	20.18	Q
2	2	Roberto Hernández	Cuba	20.43	Q
3	1	Félix Stevens	Cuba	20.61	Q
4	2	Kevin Little	United States	20.77	Q
5	1	Troy Douglas	Bermuda	20.78	q
6	1	Peter Ogilvie	Canada	21.01	q
7	3	Ronnell Barclay	Trinidad and Tobago	21.07	Q
8	3	Kevin Braunskill	United States	21.21	Q
9	3	Joseph Styles	Bahamas	21.24	
10	1	Terrence Harewood	Barbados	21.27	
11	3	Henrico Atkins	Barbados	21.29	
12	3	Carlos Moreno	Chile	21.36	
13	2	Dennis Mowatt	Jamaica	21.57	
14	2	Edgardo Guilbe	Puerto Rico	21.64	
15	1	Carlos Morales	Chile	21.67	
16	3	Wayne Watson	Jamaica	21.80	
17	1	Derry Pemberton	United States Virgin Islands	21.84	
18	3	William Archer	British Virgin Islands	22.07	
19	2	James Fleming	United States Virgin Islands	22.09	
20	2	Eswort Coombs	Saint Vincent and the Grenadines	22.41	
21	1	Kent Dennie	Saint Vincent and the Grenadines	22.57	
22	3	Lindford Castillo	Belize	23.09	
23	2	Michael Joseph	Belize	23.31	
24	2	Junior Cornette	Guyana	30.24	

=== Final ===
Wind: +0.2 m/s

Rank	Name	Nationality	Time	Notes
1st place, gold medalist(s)	Robson da Silva	Brazil	20.15	
2nd place, silver medalist(s)	Kevin Little	United States	20.63	
3rd place, bronze medalist(s)	Félix Stevens	Cuba	20.76	
4	Peter Ogilvie	Canada	21.20	
5	Troy Douglas	Bermuda	21.26	
6	Ronnell Barclay	Trinidad and Tobago	21.51	
7	Roberto Hernández	Cuba	23.22	
	Kevin Braunskill	United States	DNS	
