= Athletics at the 1991 Pan American Games – Men's 100 metres =

Men's 100 metres at the Pan American Games

The men's 100 metres event at the 1991 Pan American Games was held in Havana, Cuba on 4 and 5 August.

== Medalists ==
Gold	Silver	Bronze
Robson da Silva; Brazil	Andre Cason; United States	Jeff Williams; United States

== Results ==
=== Heats ===
Wind:
Heat 1: -2.3 m/s, Heat 2: -1.5 m/s, Heat 3: -1.2 m/s

Rank	Heat	Name	Nationality	Time	Notes
1	3	Joel Isasi	Cuba	10.25	Q
2	3	Michael Green	Jamaica	10.37	Q
3	1	Andre Cason	United States	10.43	Q
4	3	Donovan Bailey	Canada	10.44	q
5	2	Robson da Silva	Brazil	10.45	Q
6	2	John Mair	Jamaica	10.50	Q
7	2	Jeff Williams	United States	10.51	q
8	1	Arnaldo da Silva	Brazil	10.58	Q
9	1	Andrés Simón	Cuba	10.63	
10	2	Carlos Bernardo Moreno	Chile	10.66	
11	2	Neville Hodge	United States Virgin Islands	10.76	
11	3	Troy Douglas	Bermuda	10.76	
13	2	Henrico Atkins	Barbados	10.85	
14	3	Junior Cornette	Guyana	10.88	
15	3	Alfonso Pitters	Panama	10.92	
16	3	Willis Todman	British Virgin Islands	10.93	
17	1	Michael Dwyer	Canada	10.97	
18	1	Joseph Styles	Bahamas	11.00	
19	1	Florencio Aguilar	Panama	11.05	
20	3	Derry Pemberton	United States Virgin Islands	11.07	
21	2	Lindel Hodge	British Virgin Islands	11.24	
22	1	Dexter Browne	Saint Vincent and the Grenadines	11.48	
23	2	Kent Dennie	Saint Vincent and the Grenadines	11.53	

=== Final ===
Wind: -1.1 m/s

Rank	Name	Nationality	Time	Notes
1st place, gold medalist(s)	Robson da Silva	Brazil	10.32	
2nd place, silver medalist(s)	Andre Cason	United States	10.35	
3rd place, bronze medalist(s)	Jeff Williams	United States	10.48	
4	Joel Isasi	Cuba	10.51	
5	John Mair	Jamaica	10.55	
6	Michael Green	Jamaica	10.69	
7	Arnaldo da Silva	Brazil	10.70	
8	Donovan Bailey	Canada	10.76	
