= Félix Stevens =

Cuban sprinter (born 1964)

Personal information
- Born: 8 March 1964 (age 62)

Sport
- Sport: Track and field
Medal record
Representing Cuba
Pan American Games
Gold medal – first place	1991 Havana	4x100m relay
Bronze medal – third place	1991 Havana	200m
Central American and Caribbean Games
Gold medal – first place	1986 Santiago	400m
Gold medal – first place	1986 Santiago	4x400m relay
Summer Universiade
Silver medal – second place	1989 Duisburg	200m

Félix Stevens (born March 8, 1964) is a retired male sprinter from Cuba. He competed for his native country in the 1980s and the early 1990s. On July 7, 1989, at a meet in Sofia, Bulgaria, he achieved his best in the men's 200 metres event (20.24).

== International competitions ==
Year	Competition	Venue	Position	Event	Notes
Representing Cuba
1985	Central American and Caribbean Championships	Nassau, Bahamas	2nd	200 m	20.70
1986	Central American and Caribbean Games	Santiago, Dominican Republic	1st	400 m	44.98
1986	Central American and Caribbean Games	Santiago, Dominican Republic	1st	4 × 400 m relay	3:02.41
1986	Ibero-American Championships	Havana, Cuba	—	200 m	DNF
1986	Ibero-American Championships	Havana, Cuba	1st	400 m	45.83
1987	Pan American Games	Indianapolis, United States	7th	200 m	21.11
1988	Ibero-American Championships	Mexico City, Mexico	1st^{[nb]}	400 m	45.94 A
1988	Ibero-American Championships	Mexico City, Mexico	1st	4x400 m relay	2:59.71 A
1989	Universiade	Duisburg, West Germany	2nd	200 m	20.58 (w)
1989	World Cup	Barcelona, Spain	6th	4x100 m relay	39.07
1990	Goodwill Games	Seattle, United States	5th	200 m	21.16
1990	Goodwill Games	Seattle, United States	2nd	4x100 m relay	38.49
1990	Goodwill Games	Seattle, United States	3rd	4x400 m relay	3:03.35
1990	Central American and Caribbean Games	Mexico City, Mexico	2nd (h)	200 m	20.85
1990	Central American and Caribbean Games	Mexico City, Mexico	1st	4x100 m relay	39.09
1991	Pan American Games	Havana, Cuba	3rd	200 m	20.76
1991	Pan American Games	Havana, Cuba	1st	4x100 m	39.08
1992	Ibero-American Championships	Seville, Spain	1st (h)	200m	21.31(+1.2 m/s)

- ^{nb} Extra guest final
