= Robson Caetano =

Brazilian sprinter (born 1964)

Róbson da Silva
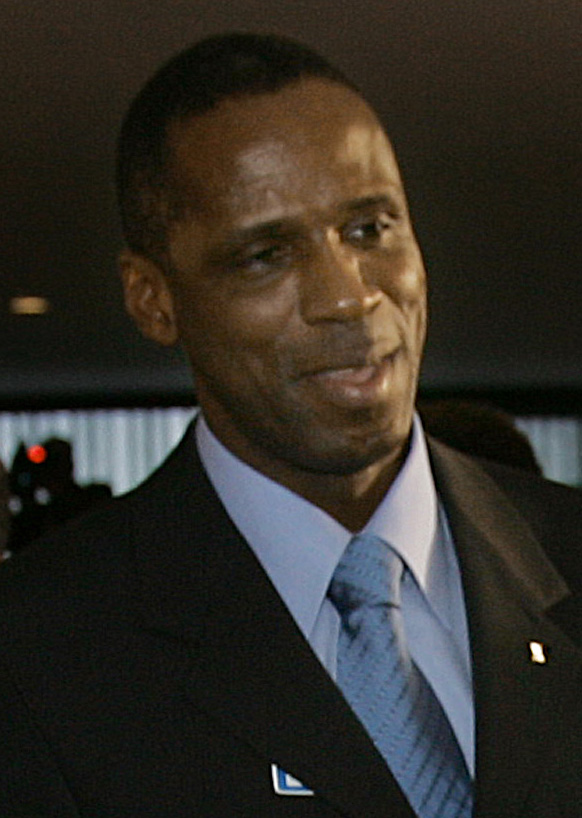

Personal information
- Full name: Róbson Caetano da Silva
- Nationality: Brazil
- Born: September 4, 1964 (age 62) Rio de Janeiro, Rio de Janeiro, Brazil
- Height: 1.87 m (6 ft 2 in)
- Weight: 74 kg (163 lb)

Sport
- Sport: Track and field
Medal record
Men's athletics
Representing Brazil
Olympic Games
Bronze medal – third place	1988 Seoul	200 metres
Bronze medal – third place	1996 Atlanta	4×100 m relay
World Indoor Championships
Bronze medal – third place	1987 Indianapolis	200 m
Pan American Games
Gold medal – first place	1991 Havana	100 metres
Gold medal – first place	1991 Havana	200 metres
Silver medal – second place	1987 Indianapolis	200 metres
Bronze medal – third place	1983 Caracas	4x100 m relay
Summer Universiade
Gold medal – first place	1989 Duisburg	200 metres
South American Youth Championships
Gold medal – first place	1979 Cochabamba	4x100 m relay
Silver medal – second place	1979 Cochabamba	100 m
Bronze medal – third place	1979 Cochabamba	200 m
- Updated on 8 May 2013

Robson Caetano da Silva (born September 4, 1964 in Rio de Janeiro) is a Brazilian sprinter. He participated in four consecutive Olympic Summer Games (1984, 1988, 1992, 1996) and won the bronze medal over 200 metres in the 1988 Seoul Olympics as well as in the 4×100 m relay in the 1996 Atlanta Olympics.

Da Silva won three victories at World Cup competitions (1985, 1989, and 1992) over 200 m. He set two South American records over 100 metres and five over 200 m. In 1989, he was ranked No. 1 in the world with a time of 19.96 s over 200 m. His personal best of 10.00 makes him the fourth fastest South American in history.

Regarding performance-enhancing drugs, Da Silva has stated he decided "not to take [them] and lose because it was a matter of character [and] dignity".

== International competitions ==
Representing Brazil
Year	Competition	Venue	Position	Event	Result	Notes
1979	South American Youth Championships	Cochabamba, Bolivia	2nd	100 m	11.0 s	A
1979	South American Youth Championships	Cochabamba, Bolivia	3rd	200 m	22.6 s	A
1979	South American Youth Championships	Cochabamba, Bolivia	1st	4 × 100 m relay	43.1 s	A
1981	South American Junior Championships	Rio de Janeiro, Brazil	1st	Long jump	7.40	
1982	Pan American Junior Championships	Barquisimeto, Venezuela	1st	100 m	10.34 (w)	
1982	Pan American Junior Championships	Barquisimeto, Venezuela	5th	Long jump	7.23 m	
1982	Pan American Junior Championships	Barquisimeto, Venezuela	4th	4 × 100 m relay	3:28.03	
1983	South American Junior Championships	Medellín, Colombia	1st	100 m	10.49	
1983	South American Junior Championships	Medellín, Colombia	1st	200 m	21.10	
1983	World Championships	Helsinki, Finland	30th (qf)	100 m	10.66	
1983	Pan American Games	Caracas, Venezuela	8th (h)	200 m	21.07	
1983	Pan American Games	Caracas, Venezuela	3rd	4 × 100 m relay	39.08	
1984	Olympic Games	Los Angeles, United States	13th (sf)	200 m	20.80	
1984	Olympic Games	Los Angeles, United States	6th (h)	4 × 100 m relay	39.27	
1985	South American Championships	Santiago, Chile	2nd	100 m	10.45	
1985	South American Championships	Santiago, Chile	1st	200 m	20.70	
1985	South American Championships	Santiago, Chile	1st	4 × 100 m relay	40.00	
1985	World Cup	Canberra, Australia	1st	200 m	20.44^{1}	
1985	World Cup	Canberra, Australia	2nd	4 × 100 m relay	38.31^{1}	
1986	Ibero-American Championships	Havana, Cuba	1st	100 m	10.02 (+1.8 m/s)	
1986	Ibero-American Championships	Havana, Cuba	1st	200 m	20.43 (+1.2 m/s)	
1986	Ibero-American Championships	Havana, Cuba	1st	4 × 100 m relay	39.30	
1987	World Indoor Championships	Indianapolis, United States	3rd	200 m	20.92	
1987	Pan American Games	Indianapolis, United States	2nd	200 m	20.49	
1987	Pan American Games	Indianapolis, United States	4th	4 × 100 m relay	39.85	
1987	World Championships	Rome, Italy	26th (qf)	100 m	10.53	
1987	World Championships	Rome, Italy	4th	200 m	20.22	
1987	World Championships	Rome, Italy	9th (sf)	4 × 100 m relay	39.22	
1987	South American Championships	São Paulo, Brazil	1st	100 m	10.39	
1987	South American Championships	São Paulo, Brazil	1st	200 m	21.04	
1987	South American Championships	São Paulo, Brazil	1st	4 × 100 m relay	40.17	
1988	Ibero-American Championships	Mexico City, Mexico	1st	100 m	10.08 (+1.2 m/s)	A
1988	Ibero-American Championships	Mexico City, Mexico	1st	200 m	20.05 (-0.3 m/s)	A
1988	Ibero-American Championships	Mexico City, Mexico	2nd (h)	4 × 100 m relay	39.20	A
1988	Olympic Games	Seoul, South Korea	5th	100 m	10.11	
1988	Olympic Games	Seoul, South Korea	3rd	200 m	20.04	
1989	World Indoor Championships	Budapest, Hungary	2nd (sf)	200 m	20.86^{2}	
1989	South American Championships	Medellín, Colombia	1st	200 m	20.44	
1989	Universiade	Duisburg, West Germany	1st	200 m	20.33 (w)	
1989	World Cup	Barcelona, Spain	1st	200 m	20.00^{1}	
1990	Goodwill Games	Seattle, United States	2nd	200 m	20.77	
1990	Ibero-American Championships	Manaus, Brazil	1st	100 m	10.12 (+1.2 m/s)	
1990	Ibero-American Championships	Manaus, Brazil	1st	200 m	20.43 (+0.3 m/s)	
1990	Ibero-American Championships	Manaus, Brazil	1st	4 × 100 m relay	40.37	
1991	South American Championships	Manaus, Brazil	1st	100 m	10.18	
1991	South American Championships	Manaus, Brazil	1st	200 m	20.79	
1991	South American Championships	Manaus, Brazil	1st	4 × 100 m relay	39.90	
1991	Pan American Games	Havana, Cuba	1st	100 m	10.32	
1991	Pan American Games	Havana, Cuba	1st	200 m	20.15	
1991	World Championships	Tokyo, Japan	7th	100 m	10.12	
1991	World Championships	Tokyo, Japan	4th	200 m	20.49	
1992	Ibero-American Championships	Seville, Spain	1st	200 m	20.58 (-2.6 m/s)	
1992	Ibero-American Championships	Seville, Spain	3rd	4 × 100 m relay	39.63	
1992	Olympic Games	Barcelona, Spain	9th (sf)	100 m	10.32	
1992	Olympic Games	Barcelona, Spain	4th	200 m	20.45	
1992	Olympic Games	Barcelona, Spain	4th	4 × 400 m relay	3:01.61	
1992	World Cup	Havana, Cuba	4th	100 m	10.34^{1}	
1992	World Cup	Havana, Cuba	1st	200 m	20.56^{1}	
1992	World Cup	Havana, Cuba	2nd	4 × 100 m relay	38.51^{1}	
1993	South American Championships	Lima, Peru	1st	100 m	10.58	
1993	South American Championships	Lima, Peru	1st	200 m	20.90	
1993	World Championships	Stuttgart, Germany	3rd (qf)	200 m	20.24^{3}	
1994	World Cup	London, United Kingdom	4th	4 × 100 m relay	39.39^{1}	
1995	Pan American Games	Mar del Plata, Argentina	4th	200 m	20.60	
1995	Pan American Games	Mar del Plata, Argentina	7th	4 × 100 m relay	40.07	
1995	South American Championships	Manaus, Brazil	1st	100 m	10.29	
1995	South American Championships	Manaus, Brazil	1st	200 m	20.54	
1995	South American Championships	Manaus, Brazil	1st	4 × 100 m relay	39.42	
1995	World Championships	Gothenburg, Sweden	9th (sf)	100 m	10.20	
1995	World Championships	Gothenburg, Sweden	4th	200 m	20.21	
1995	World Championships	Gothenburg, Sweden	6th	4 × 100 m relay	39.35	
1996	Olympic Games	Atlanta, United States	24th (qf)	200 m	20.65	
1996	Olympic Games	Atlanta, United States	3rd	4 × 100 m relay	38.41	
1997	World Championships	Athens, Greece	6th	4 × 100 m relay	38.48	
1998	Ibero-American Championships	Lisbon, Portugal	6th	200 m	21.08	
1998	Ibero-American Championships	Lisbon, Portugal	1st	4 × 100 m relay	39.82	

^{1}Representing the Americas
^{2}Disqualified in the final
^{3}Disqualified in the semifinals

Sporting positions
Preceded by Joe DeLoach	Men's 200 m Best Year Performance; 1989	Succeeded by Michael Johnson
Preceded by Unknown; Sidney Telles de Souza	Brazil's National Champion 100 metres 1991–1993; 1995	Succeeded by Sidney Telles de Souza; Arnaldo da Silva
