= Dannette Young =

American sprinter

Personal information
- Born: October 6, 1964 (age 62) Jacksonville, Florida, U.S.
Medal record
Women's athletics
Representing United States
Olympic Games
Gold medal – first place	1988 Seoul	4 × 100 metres relay
Silver medal – second place	1992 Barcelona	4 × 400 metres relay
Summer Universiade
Gold medal – first place	1987 Zagreb	4 x 100 metres relay
Bronze medal – third place	1987 Zagreb	200 metres

Dannette Louise Young-Stone (born October 6, 1964) is an American former track and field athlete. She won a gold medal at the 1988 Summer Olympics in Seoul as a member of the 4 × 100 metres relay team. Four years later at the 1992 Summer Olympics, in Barcelona, she won a silver medal in the 4 × 400 meters relay. She is an alumna of Alabama A&M University, where she won the Division II track title in the 100 and 200 meters three straight years, as well as running anchor on the 4 × 100 meters relay team at Alabama A&M.
