= Randy Heisler =

American Olympic discus thrower (born 1961)

Personal information
- Born: August 7, 1961 (age 64) Warsaw, Indiana
Medal record
Representing United States
Summer Universiade
Gold medal – first place	1987 Zagreb	Discus throw
Pan American Games
Bronze medal – third place	1987 Indianapolis	Discus throw
Bronze medal – third place	1995 Mar del Plata	Discus throw

Randall Lee Heisler (born August 7, 1961) is an American former discus thrower who competed in the 1988 Summer Olympics in Seoul, South Korea. He was head coach at Indiana University for several years before stepping down. Soon after, he became the head track coach at Ball State University, where he coached until 2015.

== Achievements ==
Year	Competition	Venue	Position	Event	Notes
Representing the United States
1988	Olympic Games	Seoul, South Korea	17th	Discus	59.08 m
