= Emilio Samayoa =

Guatemalan sprinter

Personal information
- Nationality: Guatemalan
- Born: 22 July 1964 (age 61)

Sport
- Sport: Sprinting
- Event: 100 metres

Emilio Vladimir Samayoa Oliva (born 22 July 1964) is a Guatemalan sprinter. He competed in the men's 100 metres at the 1984 Summer Olympics.
