= Issa Alassane-Ousséni =

Beninese sprinter (born 1961)

Personal information
- Nationality: Beninese
- Born: 10 May 1961 (age 65)

Sport
- Sport: Sprinting
- Event: 100 metres

Issa Alassane-Ousséni (born 10 May 1961) is a Beninese sprinter. He competed in the men's 100 metres at the 1988 Summer Olympics.
