= Herman Adam =

Mexican athlete

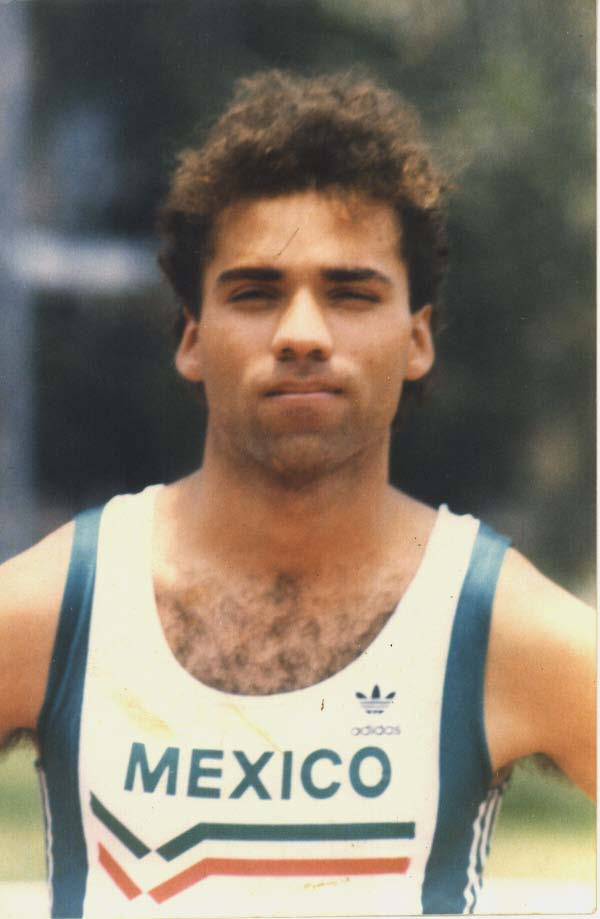

Personal information
- Born: 2 August 1965 (age 60) Poza Rica, Mexico

Sport
- Sport: Track and field

Herman Adam Negrete (born 2 August 1965) is a Mexican sprinter. He has participated in the Olympic Games, World Athletics Championships, and other international competitions. His athletic disciplines include the 100m, 200m, 400m, long jump, and the 4 × 100 m and 4 × 400 m relays, his best record 10.39sec in 100m at CONADEIP is still unbeaten.

== Biography ==
His parents were Jorge Adam Hernández and Carmen Negrete Pulido. At an early age he took part in baseball and American football, but achieved his main successes in athletics, competing at international level. He graduated from the Universidad de las Américas Puebla.

== International events ==
Herman competed in the following:

- Seoul Olympics, South Korea 1988.
- Barcelona Olympics, Spain 1992.
- 1991 World Championships in Athletics, Tokyo, Japan 1991.
- 1993 World Championships in Athletics, Stuttgart, Germany 1993.
- 1991 Central American and Caribbean Championships in Athletics, Jalapa, 1991.
- 1993 Central American and Caribbean Championships in Athletics, Cali, 1993.
- 1988 Ibero-American Championships in Athletics, Mexico City, 1988.
- 1992 Ibero-American Championships in Athletics, Seville, Spain, 1992.
- 1990 Central American and Caribbean Games, Mexico City, 1990.
- 1987 Summer Universiade, Zagreb, Yugoslavia 1987.

== Best results ==
- Record National Championship de Invitación Jorge Molina Celis 100m 10.2 sec
- Record National Championship CONADEIP 1989 100m 10.39 sec
- Record National 4 × 100 m Relay (Selección México) 39.32 sec

== Projects ==
The "Herman Adam" Athletics Club has been a leading athletics team for children and young people at the Veracruz stadium, and its members have included medal-winners at the national level.
