= Domenico Gorla =

Italian sprinter (born 1965)

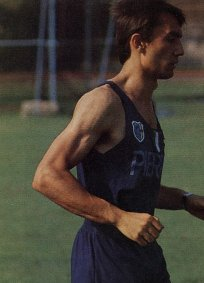

Personal information
- Nationality: Italian
- Born: 7 February 1965 (age 61) Milan, Italy

Sport
- Country: Italy
- Sport: Athletics
- Event: Sprint
- Club: G.S. Fiamme Azzurre

Achievements and titles
- Personal bests: 100 m: 10.44 (1985); 200 m: 21.00 (1985)
Medal record
European Cup
Bronze medal – third place	1985 Moscow	4×100 metres relay
World Military Championships
Silver medal – second place	1989 Rome	4×100 metres relay
Silver medal – second place	1990 Kajaani	4×100 metres relay

Domenico Gorla (born 7 February 1965) is a retired Italian sprinter who specialized in the 100 metres.

== Biography ==
He finished seventh in 4×100 m relay at the 1987 World Championships, with teammates Ezio Madonia, Paolo Catalano and Pierfrancesco Pavoni. His personal best 100 metres time is 10.44 seconds, achieved in June 1989 in Trento. His personal best 200 metres time is 21.00 seconds, achieved in July 1985 in Rome.

== Achievements ==
Year	Competition	Venue	Position	Event	Performance	Notes
1987	World Championships	(Italy) Rome	7th	4×100 m relay	39.62	

== See also ==
- Italy national relay team
