= Lorenzo Daniel =

American sprinter

Personal information
- Nationality: American
- Born: March 23, 1966 (age 60) Avera, Georgia, United States

Sport
- Sport: Running
- Event: 200 metres
- College team: MSU Bulldogs

Achievements and titles
- Personal best: 200 m: 19.87 (Eugene 1988)
Medal record
1988: 200m NCAA National Champion
Representing United States
Summer Universiade
Gold medal – first place	1987 Zagreb	4x100m relay
Gold medal – first place	1987 Zagreb	4x400m relay
Bronze medal – third place	1985 Kobe	4x100m relay

Lorenzo Daniel (born March 23, 1966) is an American retired track and field sprinter, best known for setting the 1985 world's best year performance in the men's 200 meters and being one of the fastest to run the event at the time. He did so on May 18, 1985, at a meet in Starkville, Mississippi, clocking 20.07. His fastest-ever 200m dash was 19.87 at Eugene, Oregon in 1988. He attended Mississippi State University, and majored in Sports Communication. Daniel was born in Avera, Georgia and grew up in Wrens, Georgia. He was once the third-fastest man in the world. Though he made the 1988 Olympics, he injured himself before he could attend The Games. He now resides in Dallas, Texas; has a wife, Sissy Sanders-Daniel and three children: Lauren, Lorenzo Jr., and Lorielle. He also founded and currently runs a sports agility company, Turbo Techniques.

== Track records ==
As of September 2024, Daniel holds the following track records for 200 metres.

Location	Time	Windspeed m/s	Date
Auburn	19.93	– 1.5	15/05/1988
Tuscaloosa, Alabama	19.88	+ 3.4	17/05/1987

Sporting positions
Preceded by (United States) Carl Lewis	Men's 200 m Best Year Performance; 1985	Succeeded by (United States) Floyd Heard
