= Victor Edet =

Nigerian sprinter

Personal information
- Born: 24 February 1966 (age 60)

Sport
- Sport: Track and field
Medal record
Representing Nigeria
African Championships
Gold medal – first place	1985 Cairo	4×100 m
Bronze medal – third place	1985 Cairo	100 m

Victor Edet (born 24 February 1966) is a retired Nigerian sprinter.

Edet competed for the Missouri Tigers track and field team in the NCAA.

Individually he won the bronze medal in the 100 metres at the 1985 African Championships and competed in the 60 and 200 metres at the 1985 World Indoor Championships without reaching the final.

In the 4 x 100 metres relay he competed at the 1988 Summer Olympics without reaching the final, won a gold medal at the 1985 African Championships, and also finished seventh with the African team at the 1985 World Cup.

His personal best 100 m time was 10.14 seconds, achieved in April 1988 in Waco. He also recorded 10.13 seconds in May 1987 in Ames, but with unknown wind assistance.
