= Courtney Brown (sprinter) =

Canadian sprinter

Personal information
- Nationality: Canadian
- Born: 21 April 1965 (age 61) Portland Cottage, Clarendon Parish, Jamaica

Sport
- Sport: Sprinting
- Events: 200 metres and 400 metres

Courtney Brown (born 21 April 1965) is a Canadian former sprinter. He competed in the men's 200 metres at the 1988 Summer Olympics.

Brown competed for the Rice Owls track and field team in Texas, United States, where he was described as a standout and was a multiple-time All American on relays.
