= Hiroki Fuwa =

Japanese sprinter (born 1966)

Personal information
- Nationality: Japanese
- Born: 9 July 1966 (age 60) Numata, Japan

Sport
- Sport: Sprinting
- Event: 100 metres
Medal record
Men's athletics
Representing Japan
Summer Universiade
Bronze medal – third place	1987 Zagreb	4x100 m relay
Asian Games
Silver medal – second place	1986 Seoul	100 m
Silver medal – second place	1986 Seoul	4x100 m relay
Asian Championships
Bronze medal – third place	1991 Kuala Lumpur	200 m
Bronze medal – third place	1991 Kuala Lumpur	4×100 m relay

Hiroki Fuwa (不破 弘樹, Fuwa Hiroki; born 9 July 1966) is a Japanese sprinter. He competed in the men's 100 metres at the 1984 Summer Olympics.
