= Andrew Smith (sprinter) =

Jamaican sprinter

Personal information
- Born: 29 January 1964 (age 62)

Sport
- Sport: Track and field
Medal record
Representing Jamaica
World Championships
Bronze medal – third place	1987 Rome	4×100 m relay
Pan American Games
Bronze medal – third place	1987 San Juan	4×100 m relay
Central American and Caribbean Games
Silver medal – second place	1986 Santiago	4x100 m relay

Andrew Smith (born 29 January 1964) is a Jamaican former track and field sprinter who competed in the 100 metres. He represented his country at the 1988 Summer Olympics.

Running for the TCU Horned Frogs track and field team, Smith won three titles in the 4 × 100 meter relay at the NCAA Division I Outdoor Track and Field Championships, in 1986, 1987, and 1989.

Smith had a very brief period of international success. He appeared at the 1987 Pan American Games and after finishing sixth in the individual 100 m he won a bronze medal in the 4×100 metres relay with the Jamaica national team, including Ray Stewart, Clive Wright and John Mair. The team regrouped for the 1987 World Championships in Athletics and won another bronze medal – the first time that Jamaican men won a relay medal at the competition.

Smith was given a berth in the individual 100 for the Seoul Olympics, but failed to make it past the quarterfinals stage due to an injury that he sustained while running the anchor leg on Jamaica's 4 × 100 m relay at a warmup meet two days before the start of the Olympics. Head coach Mr. Herb McKenley, wanted to withdraw Smith from the 100m but Smith was determined to compete and ran with his torn hamstring in the heats where he qualified for the quarterfinals. However, there were seven false starts in his quarterfinals which made his injured hamstring worse. He refused to quit and ended up running somewhat slower in the second round. Along with teammate Raymond Stewart's injury, that prevented Jamaica from medalling in the 4 × 100 m relay. He ran his personal best that year, recording a time of 10.14 seconds for the 100 m in Kingston, Jamaica. He also ran wind-aided times of 10.11 and 10.12. In his last major international outing he won his first and only individual medal, securing the 100 m bronze behind the Cuban duo of Joel Isasi and Andrés Simón at the 1989 Central American and Caribbean Championships in Athletics.

== Personal bests ==
- 100 metres – 10.14 seconds (1988)
- 200 metres – 20.65 seconds (1987)

== International competitions ==
Year	Competition	Venue	Position	Event	Notes
1987	Pan American Games	Indianapolis, United States	6th	100 m	10.62
1987	Pan American Games	Indianapolis, United States	3rd	4 × 100 m relay	38.86
1987	World Championships	Rome, Italy	7th (semis)	100 m	10.41
1987	World Championships	Rome, Italy	3rd	4 × 100 m relay	38.41
1988	Olympic Games	Seoul, South Korea	7th (q-finals)	100 m	10.63
1989	CAC Championships	San Juan, Puerto Rico	3rd	100 m	10.47

== See also ==
- Athletics in Jamaica
- 4×100 metres relay at the World Championships in Athletics
