= Athletics at the 1987 Summer Universiade =

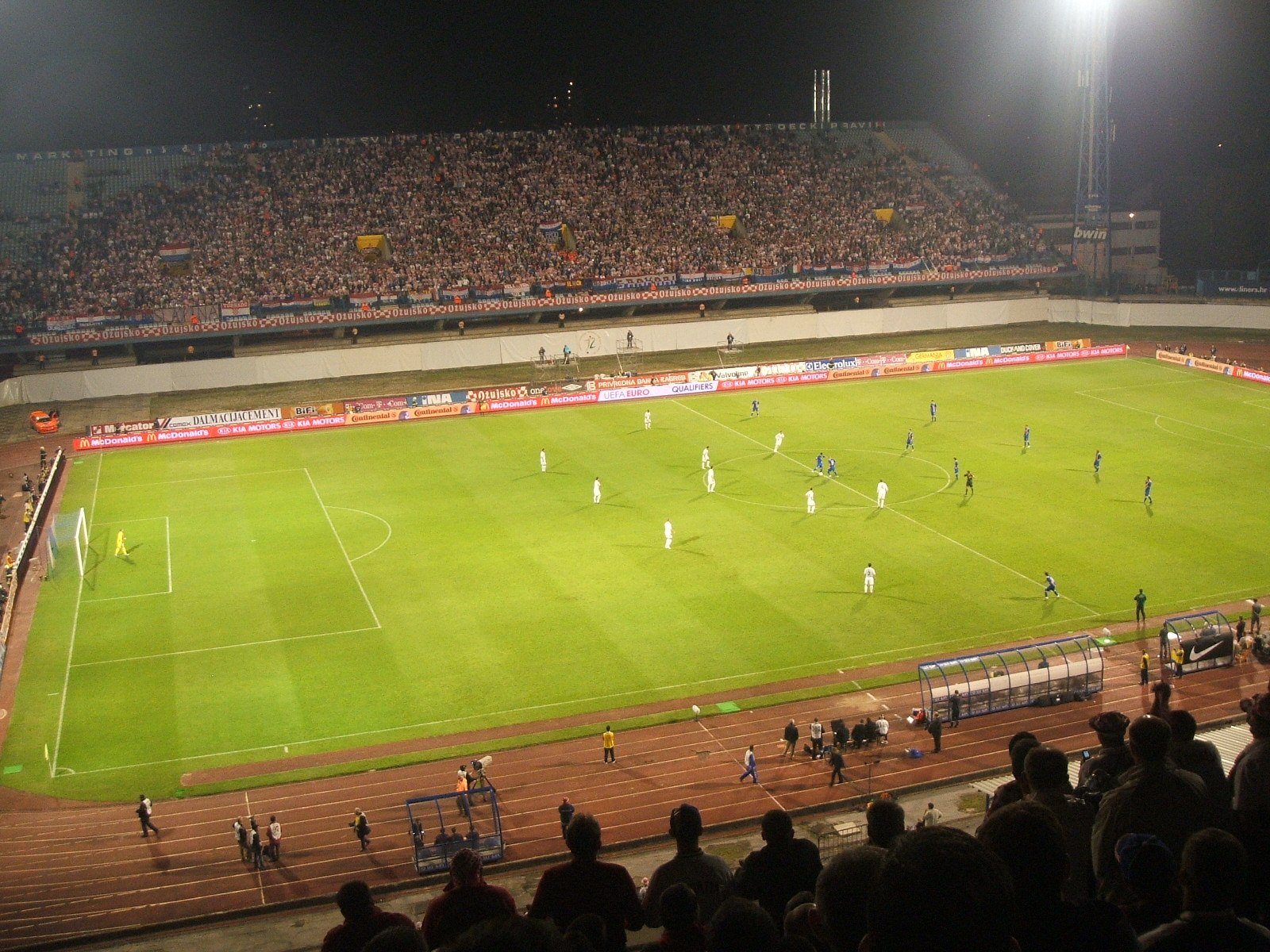
- Dates: 13–19 July 1987
- Host city: Zagreb; Yugoslavia (Socialist Federal Republic of Yugoslavia)
- Venue: Stadion Maksimir
- Events: 42

Athletics events were contested at the 1987 Summer Universiade in Zagreb, SR Croatia, SFR Yugoslavia between 13 and 19 July 1987.

== Medal summary ==
=== Men's events ===
Event	Gold		Silver		Bronze	
100 metres (wind: +0.5 m/s)	Lee McRae (USA)	10.07	Brian Cooper (USA)	10.21	Bruno Marie-Rose (FRA)	10.25
200 metres (wind: +1.4 m/s)	Wallace Spearmon, Sr. (USA)	20.42	Floyd Heard (USA)	20.44	Edgardo Guilbe (PUR)	20.92
400 metres	Mike Franks (USA)	45.33	Moses Ugbisie (NGR)	45.37	Raymond Pierre (USA)	45.67
800 metres	Slobodan Popović (YUG)	1:46.13	Moussa Fall (SEN)	1:46.71	Luis Toledo (MEX)	1:47.07
1500 metres	Hauke Fuhlbrügge (GDR)	3:44.87	Rob Harrison (GBR)	3:45.13	Andrey Ponomaryov (URS)	3:45.52
5000 metres	Anacleto Jiménez (ESP)	14:08.15	Michael Blackmore (USA)	14:08.30	David Swain (GBR)	14:09.21
10,000 metres	Axel Krippschock (GDR)	29:07.02	Spyros Andriopoulos (GRE)	29:08.65	Pat Porter (USA)	29:20.95
Marathon	Takahiro Izumi (JPN)	2:24:23	Takahashi Murakami (JPN)	2:24:55	Viktor Gural (URS)	2:27:01
110 metres hurdles (wind: -0.1 m/s)	Jon Ridgeon (GBR)	13.29	Arthur Blake (USA)	13.38	Keith Talley (USA)	13.40
400 metres hurdles	Dave Patrick (USA)	48.75	Athanasios Kalogiannis (GRE)	48.80	Ryoichi Yoshida (JPN)	49.20
3000 metres steeplechase	Valeriy Vandyak (URS)	8:33.23	Juan Ramón Conde (CUB)	8:33.86	Shigeyuki Aikyo (JPN)	8:34.23
4 × 100 metres relay	United States (USA); Lee McRae; Floyd Heard; Lorenzo Daniel; Wallace Spearmon Sr. Michael Marsh; Brian Cooper	38.66	France (FRA); Pierre Boutry; Christophe Boyer; Jean-Charles Trouabal; Bruno Dufernez	39.42	Japan (JPN); Shinji Aoto; Takashi Ichikawa; Hirohisa Ota; Hiroki Fuwa	39.57
4 × 400 metres relay	United States (USA); Raymond Pierre; Lorenzo Daniel; David Patrick; Kevin Robinzine	3:01.78	Yugoslavia (YUG); Branislav Karaulić; Slobodan Popović; Slobodan Branković; Ismail Mačev	3:03.95	Soviet Union (URS); Oleg Fatun; Valery Starodubtsev; Tagir Zemskov; Vladimir Prosin	3:05.85
20 kilometres walk	Raffaello Ducceschi (ITA)	1:25:02	Giacomo Poggi (ITA)	1:25:17	Pierluigi Fiorella (ITA)	1:26:58
High jump	James Lott (USA)	2.30	Sašo Apostolovski (YUG)	2.30	Sorin Matei (ROM)	2.30
Pole vault	Viktor Spasov (URS)	5.65	Radion Gataullin (URS)	5.60	Scott Davis (USA)	5.60
Long jump	Mike Powell (USA)	8.19	Paul Emordi (NGR)	8.11	Sergey Zaozerskiy (URS)	8.06
Triple jump	Charles Simpkins (USA)	17.16	Kenny Harrison (USA)	17.07	Māris Bružiks (URS)	16.90
Shot put	Klaus Görmer (GDR)	20.38	Vladimir Yaryshkin (URS)	20.12	Ron Backes (USA)	20.09
Discus throw	Randy Heisler (USA)	62.38	Vaclavas Kidykas (URS)	61.72	Kostas Georgakopoulos (GRE)	60.54
Hammer throw	Igor Astapkovich (URS)	78.46	Heinz Weis (FRG)	76.98	Lucio Serrani (ITA)	75.70
Javelin throw	Marek Kaleta (URS)	81.42	Sejad Krdžalić (YUG)	80.26	Volker Hadwich (GDR)	78.82
Decathlon	Siegfried Wentz (FRG)	8348	Jim Connolly (USA)	8026	Patrick Gellens (FRA)	7786

=== Women's events ===
Event	Gold		Silver		Bronze	
100 metres (wind: +0.9 m/s)	Gwen Torrence (USA)	11.09	Irina Slyusar (URS)	11.34	Tina Iheagwam (NGR)	11.40
200 metres (wind: +1.5 m/s)	Gwen Torrence (USA)	22.44	Mary Onyali (NGR)	22.64	Dannette Young (USA)	22.72
400 metres	Denean Howard (USA)	51.07	Lyudmila Dzhigalova (URS)	51.32	Sandie Richards (JAM)	51.42
800 metres	Slobodanka Čolović (YUG)	1:56.88	Mitica Junghiatu (ROM)	1:59.28	Joetta Clark (USA)	1:59.92
1500 metres	Paula Ivan (ROM)	4:01.32	Svetlana Kitova (URS)	4.03.03	Mitica Junghiatu (ROM)	4:03.04
3000 metres	Paula Ivan (ROM)	8:53.61	Anne Schweitzer (USA)	8:59.56	Natalya Artyomova (URS)	9:02.98
10,000 metres	Patty Murray (USA)	33:11.26	Zhong Huandi (CHN)	33:11.59	Yelena Uskova (URS)	33:14.71
Marathon	Natalya Bardina (URS)	2:46:30	Takako Kanesashi (JPN)	2:46:33	Karlene Erickson (USA)	3:03:00
100 metres hurdles (wind: +1.5 m/s)	Heike Theele (GDR)	12.84	Aliuska López (CUB)	12.84	Florence Colle (FRA)	12.84
400 metres hurdles	Nawal El Moutawakel (MAR)	55.21	Nicoleta Carutasu (ROM)	55.35	Sophia Hunter (USA)	55.45
4 × 100 metres relay	United States (USA); Wendy Vereen; Jackie Washington; Dannette Young; Gwen Torrence	42.90	Soviet Union (URS); Nadezhda Roshchupkina; Natalya Pomoshchnikova-Voronova; Yelena Vinogradova; Irina Slyusar	43.17	Nigeria (NGR); Tina Iheagwam; Lynda Eseimokumoh; Mary Onyali; Falilat Ogunkoya	43.71
4 × 400 metres relay	United States (USA); Sonia Fridy; Denise Mitchell; Rochelle Stevens; Denean Howard	3:27.16	Soviet Union (URS); Yelena Vinogradova; Tatyana Ledovskaya; Larisa Lesnykh; Lyudmila Dzhigalova	3:27.65	Nigeria (NGR); Sadia Sowunmi; Kehinde Vaughan; Airat Bakare; Maria Usifo	3:33.37
5000 metres walk	Li Sujie (CHN)	21:51.50	Yelena Rodionova (URS)	22:00.01	Ann Peel (CAN)	22:01.09
High jump	Svetlana Isaeva (BUL)	1.95	Natalya Golodnova (URS)	1.91	Megumi Sato (JPN)	1.88
Long jump	Marieta Ilcu (ROM)	6.81	Ljudmila Ninova (BUL)	6.78	Heike Grabe (GDR)	6.74
Shot put	Natalya Lisovskaya (URS)	20.48	Kathrin Neimke (GDR)	20.07	Larisa Peleshenko (URS)	19.49
Discus throw	Tsvetanka Khristova (BUL)	67.96	Gabriele Reinsch (GDR)	64.12	Hou Xuemei (CHN)	64.04
Javelin throw	Irina Kostyuchenkova (URS)	66.72	Susanne Jung (GDR)	65.36	Brigitte Graune (FRG)	61.24
Heptathlon	Liliana Năstase (ROM)	6364	Yelena Davydova (URS)	6272	Zuzana Lajbnerová (TCH)	6224

== Medal table ==
Rank	Nation	Gold	Silver	Bronze	Total
1	United States (USA)	15	6	9	30
2	Soviet Union (URS)	7	12	8	27
3	East Germany (GDR)	4	3	2	9
4	Romania (ROM)	4	2	2	8
5	Yugoslavia (YUG)	2	3	0	5
6	Bulgaria (BUL)	2	1	0	3
7	Japan (JPN)	1	2	4	7
8	Cuba (CUB)	1	2	0	3
9	Italy (ITA)	1	1	2	4
10	China (CHN)	1	1	1	3
10	Great Britain (GBR)	1	1	1	3
10	West Germany (FRG)	1	1	1	3
13	Morocco (MAR)	1	0	0	1
13	Spain (ESP)	1	0	0	1
15	Nigeria (NGR)	0	3	3	6
16	Greece (GRE)	0	2	1	3
17	France (FRA)	0	1	3	4
18	Senegal (SEN)	0	1	0	1
19	Canada (CAN)	0	0	1	1
19	Czechoslovakia (TCH)	0	0	1	1
19	Jamaica (JAM)	0	0	1	1
19	Mexico (MEX)	0	0	1	1
19	Puerto Rico (PUR)	0	0	1	1
Totals (23 entries)		42	42	42	126

== See also ==
- 1987 in the sport of athletics
- FISU World University Games
- University and college sport
