= György Fetter =

Hungarian sprinter

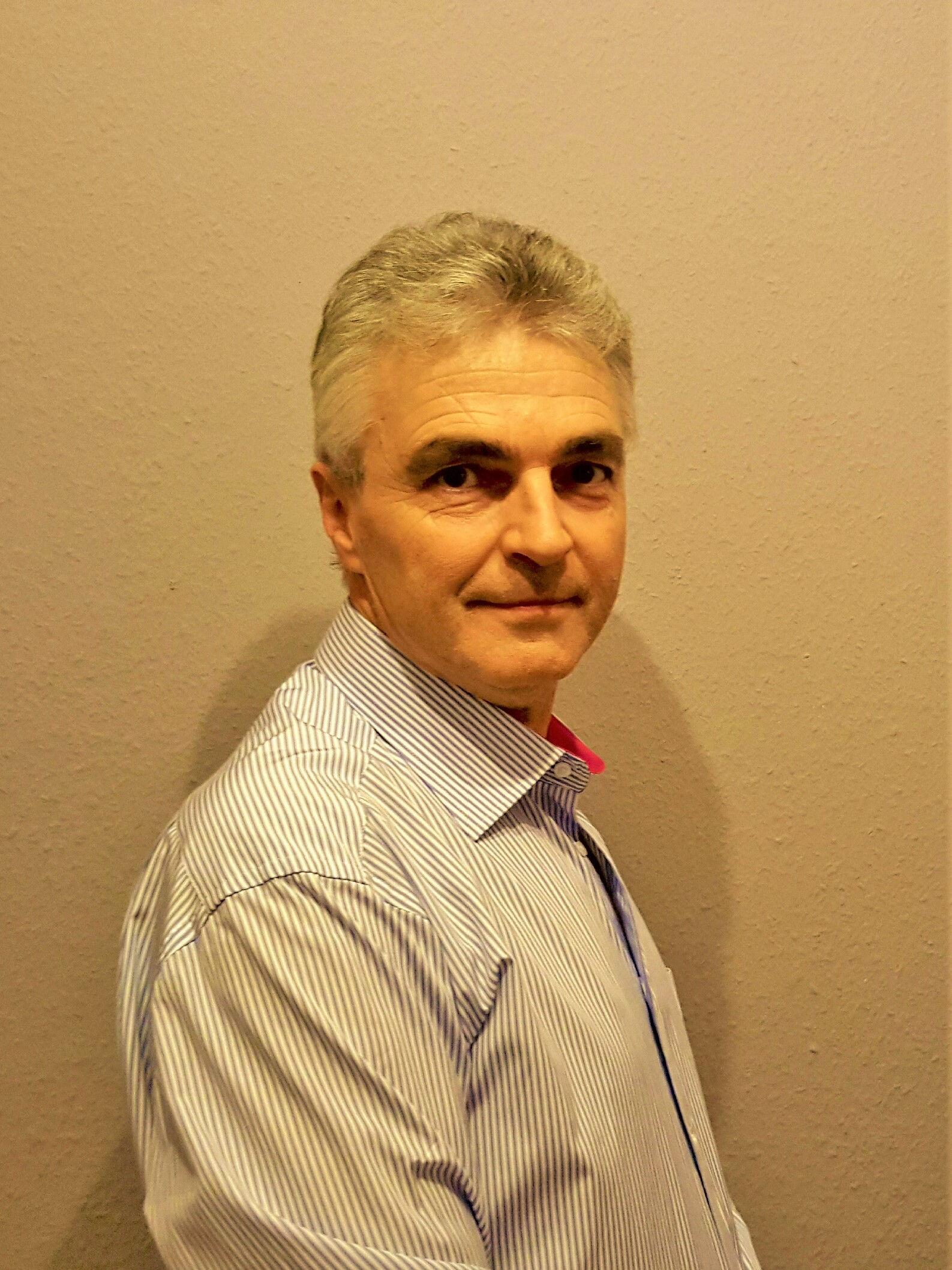
- Fetter in 2016

Personal information
- Nationality: Hungarian
- Born: 2 October 1963 (age 62) Budapest, Hungary

Sport
- Sport: Sprinting
- Event: 100 metres

György Fetter (born 2 October 1963) is a Hungarian sprinter. He competed in the men's 100 metres at the 1988 Summer Olympics.
