= Cyprian Enweani =

Danish-Canadian sprinter

Personal information
- Born: March 19, 1964 (age 62) Copenhagen, Denmark
- Home town: Saskatoon, Saskatchewan, Canada

Sport
- Sport: Track and field
Medal record
Representing Canada
Summer Universiade
Silver medal – second place	1985 Kobe	4x100m relay

Cyprian Enweani (born March 19, 1964) is a Danish-Canadian sprinter. He is a resident of Saskatoon, Saskatchewan, Canada, and is a 1989 inductee into the Saskatoon Sports Hall of Fame for his career. His most notable athletic accomplishment was appearing as a member of the Canadian Olympic Team at the 1988 Summer Olympics in Seoul, South Korea, where he competed in the 200 metres sprint and the 4 × 100 metres relay.

== Biography ==
After hearing Diane Jones-Konihowski speak after the 1976 Summer Olympics in Montreal, Cyprian Enweani began sprinting at the age of 12. By age 17, he was on the Saskatchewan Canada Games team and became the high school record holder in the 200 m and 400 m distances in 1982. In 1983, he participated at the Pan-American Games as a member of the 4 × 100 metre relay team, which came in fourth. During his tenure at the University of Saskatchewan, where he studied and graduated from the college of medicine, Enweani set school and Canada West records in the 60 m (6.84 seconds set on March 3, 1984), 200 m (21.27 seconds set on February 15, 1987), and 300 m (33.56 seconds set on February 3, 1984). In 1988, Enweani competed at the Summer Olympics. Though he was ninth overall in the 200 metres—he did not make it past the semi-finals—Enweani set a new Saskatchewan 200 metres record in each heat he ran, with his final race clocking in at 20.57 seconds, a personal best. Enweani was also a member of the 4 × 100 metres relay team at the 1988 Olympics, which came in 7th.

In 1989, he was named Kinsmen Athlete of the Year. That same year, he competed at the World University Games where he met Vanessa Monar, fellow athlete and U of S student. Four years later, in 1993, they would marry. Enweani coached his wife for the rest of her career as a long jumper. He graduated from the U of S in 1989 with a degree in medicine and today practices in Saskatoon as a family and sports doctor.
