= Athletics at the 1987 Pan American Games =

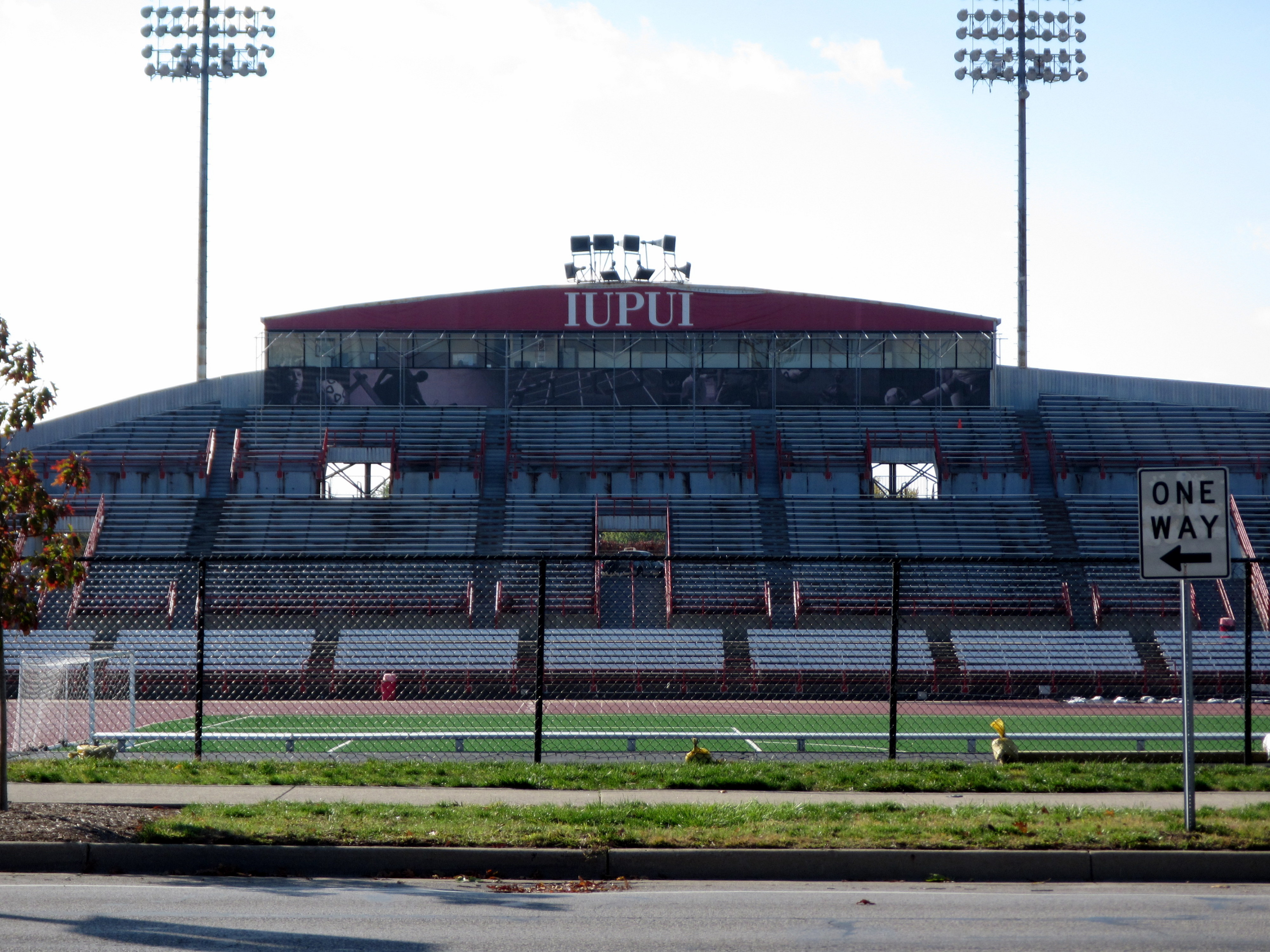
- Host venue (shown in 2012)
- Dates: 9–16 August
- Host city: Indianapolis, United States
- Venue: IU Indianapolis Track and Soccer Stadium
- Level: Senior
- Events: 43
- Participation: 405 athletes from 36 nations

The Athletics competition at the 1987 Pan American Games was held in Indianapolis, United States. The events were competed at the IU Indianapolis Track and Soccer Stadium.

== Medal summary ==
=== Men's events ===
| Event | Gold | | Silver | | Bronze | |
|---|---|---|---|---|---|---|
| 100 metres (wind: -3.4 m/s) | Lee McRae; United States | 10.26 | Ray Stewart; Jamaica | 10.27 | Juan Núñez; Dominican Republic | 10.44 |
| 200 metres (wind: +1.3 m/s) | Floyd Heard; United States | 20.25 | Robson da Silva; Brazil | 20.49 | Wallace Spearmon; United States | 20.53 |
| 400 metres | Raymond Pierre; United States | 44.60 | Bert Cameron; Jamaica | 44.72 | Roberto Hernández; Cuba | 45.13 |
| 800 metres | Johnny Gray; United States | 1:46.79 | José Luíz Barbosa; Brazil | 1:47.37 | Stanley Redwine; United States | 1:47.73 |
| 1500 metres | Joaquim Cruz; Brazil | 3:47.34 | Jim Spivey; United States | 3:47.46 | Steve Scott; United States | 3:47.76 |
| 5000 metres | Arturo Barrios; Mexico | 13:31.40 | Adauto Domingues; Brazil | 13:46.41 | Omar Aguilar; Chile | 13:47.86 |
| 10,000 metres | Bruce Bickford; United States | 28:20.37 | Rolando Vera; Ecuador | 28:22.56 | Paul McCloy; Canada | 28:38.07 |
| Marathon | Ivo Rodrígues; Brazil | 2:20:13 | Ronald Lanzoni; Costa Rica | 2:20:39 | Jorge González; Puerto Rico | 2:21:14 |
| 110 metres hurdles (wind: +4.4 m/s) | Andrew Parker; Jamaica | 13.82w | Modesto Castillo; Dominican Republic | 13.96w | Ernesto Torres; Puerto Rico | 14.68w |
| 400 metres hurdles | Winthrop Graham; Jamaica | 48.49 | Kevin Young; United States | 48.74 | Dave Patrick; United States | 49.47 |
| 3000 metres steeplechase | Adauto Domingues; Brazil | 8:23.26 | Henry Marsh; United States | 8:23.77 | Brian Abshire; United States | 8:27.30 |
| 4 × 100 metres relay | United States (USA); Lee McRae; Lee McNeill; Harvey Glance; Carl Lewis | 38.41 | Cuba (CUB); Ricardo Chacón; Leandro Peñalver; Maximo Sergio Querol; Andrés Simón | 38.86 | Jamaica (JAM); John Mair; Andrew Smith; Clive Wright; Ray Stewart | 38.86 |
| 4 × 400 metres relay | United States (USA); Mark Rowe; Kevin Robinzine; Raymond Pierre; Roddie Haley | 2:59.54 | Cuba (CUB); Leandro Peñalver; Agustín Pavó; Lazaro Martínez; Roberto Hernández | 2:59.72 | Jamaica (JAM); Winthrop Graham; Mark Senior; Berris Long; Devon Morris | 3:03.57 |
| 20 kilometres walk | Carlos Mercenario; Mexico | 1:24:50 | Tim Lewis; United States | 1:25:50 | Querubín Moreno; Colombia | 1:27:08 |
| 50 kilometres walk | Martín Bermúdez; Mexico | 3:58:54 | Raúl González; Mexico | 4:07:27 | Héctor Moreno; Colombia | 4:18:48 |
| High jump | Javier Sotomayor; Cuba | 2.32 | Troy Kemp; Bahamas | 2.28 | Jerome Carter; United States | 2.28 |
| Pole vault | Mike Tully; United States | 5.71 | Rubén Camino; Cuba | 5.50 | Scott Davis; United States | 5.30 |
| Long jump | Carl Lewis; United States | 8.75 | Larry Myricks; United States | 8.58w | Jaime Jefferson; Cuba | 8.51 |
| Triple jump | Mike Conley; United States | 17.31w | Willie Banks; United States | 16.87w | Frank Rutherford; Bahamas | 16.68w |
| Shot put | Gert Weil; Chile | 20.21 | Gregg Tafralis; United States | 20.17 | Paul Ruiz; Cuba | 18.86 |
| Discus throw | Luis Delís; Cuba | 67.14 | Bradley Cooper; Bahamas | 64.56 | Randy Heisler; United States | 62.76 |
| Hammer throw | Jud Logan; United States | 77.24 | Andrés Charadía; Argentina | 69.36 | Vicente Sánchez; Cuba | 66.02 |
| Javelin throw | Duncan Atwood; United States | 78.68 | Ramón González; Cuba | 75.58 | Juan de la Garza; Mexico | 73.76 |
| Decathlon | Mike Gonzales; United States | 7649 | Keith Robinson; United States | 7573 | Gordon Orlikow; Canada | 7441 |

=== Women's events ===
| Event | Gold | | Silver | | Bronze | |
|---|---|---|---|---|---|---|
| 100 metres (wind: -2.0 m/s) | Gail Devers; United States | 11.14 | Diane Williams; United States | 11.25 | Pauline Davis; Bahamas | 11.47 |
| 200 metres (wind: +2.2 m/s) | Gwen Torrence; United States | 22.52w | Randy Givens; United States | 22.71w | Pauline Davis; Bahamas | 22.99w |
| 400 metres | Ana Fidelia Quirot; Cuba | 50.27 | Jillian Richardson; Canada | 50.35 | Denean Howard; United States | 50.72 |
| 800 metres | Ana Fidelia Quirot; Cuba | 1:59.06 | Delisa Walton-Floyd; United States | 2:00.54 | Soraya Telles; Brazil | 2:00.56 |
| 1500 metres | Linda Sheskey; United States | 4:07.84 | Debbie Bowker; Canada | 4:08.43 | Brit McRoberts; Canada | 4:11.35 |
| 3000 metres | Mary Knisely; United States | 9:06.75 | Angela Chalmers; Canada | 9:14.48 | Leslie Seymour; United States | 9:19.26 |
| 10,000 metres | Marty Cooksey; United States | 33:00.00 | Nancy Tinari; Canada | 33:02.41 | Patty Murray; United States | 33:38.12 |
| Marathon^{[nb]} | María del Carmen Cárdenas; Mexico | 2:52:06 | Debbie Warner; United States | 2:54:49 | Maribel Durruty; Cuba | 2:56:21 |
| 100 metres hurdles (wind: +1.9 m/s) | LaVonna Martin; United States | 12.81 | Stephanie Hightower; United States | 12.82 | Aliuska López; Cuba | 12.91 |
| 400 metres hurdles | Judi Brown-King; United States | 54.23 | Sandra Farmer; Jamaica | 54.59 | LaTanya Sheffield; United States | 56.15 |
| 4 × 100 metres relay | United States (USA); Sheila Echols; Gwen Torrence; Michelle Finn-Burrell; Gail Devers | 42.91 | Cuba (CUB); Eusebia Riquelme; Aliuska López; Susana Armenteros; Liliana Allen | 44.16 | Brazil (BRA); Inês Ribeiro; Cleide Amaral; Claudilea dos Santos; Sheila de Oliveira | 45.37 |
| 4 × 400 metres relay | United States (USA); Rochelle Stevens; Denean Howard; Valerie Brisco-Hooks; Diane Dixon | 3:23.35 | Canada (CAN); Charmaine Crooks; Marita Payne; Molly Killingbeck; Jillian Richardson | 3:29.18 | Jamaica (JAM); Cathy Rattray; Vivienne Spence; Ilrey Oliver; Sandie Richards | 3:29.50 |
| 10,000 metres walk | María Colín; Mexico | 47:17.15 | Ann Peel; Canada | 47:17.97 | Maryanne Torrellas; United States | 47:35.12 |
| High jump | Coleen Sommer; United States | 1.96 | Silvia Costa Acosta-Martínez; Cuba | 1.92 | Mazel Thomas; Jamaica | 1.88 |
| Long jump | Jackie Joyner-Kersee; United States | 7.45 | Jennifer Inniss; United States | 6.85 | Eloína Echevarría; Cuba | 6.42 |
| Shot put | Ramona Pagel; United States | 18.56 | María Elena Sarría; Cuba | 18.12 | Belsis Laza; Cuba | 18.06 |
| Discus throw | Maritza Martén García; Cuba | 65.58 | Hilda Ramos; Cuba | 61.34 | Connie Price; United States | 59.52 |
| Javelin throw | Ivonne Leal; Cuba | 63.70 | María Caridad Colón; Cuba | 61.66 | Marieta Riera; Venezuela | 57.10 |
| Heptathlon | Cindy Greiner; United States | 6184 | Connie Polman-Tuin; Canada | 5862 | Jolanda Jones; United States | 5823 |

- ^{nb} Some sources erroneously state the winner of the women's marathon as María del Carmen Díaz (later a Pan American Games winner on the track) instead of the correct winner, María del Carmen Cárdenas.

== Medal table ==
| Rank | Nation | Gold | Silver | Bronze | Total |
|---|---|---|---|---|---|
| 1 | United States | 26 | 14 | 15 | 55 |
| 2 | Cuba | 6 | 9 | 8 | 23 |
| 3 | Mexico | 5 | 1 | 1 | 7 |
| 4 | Brazil | 3 | 3 | 2 | 8 |
| 5 | Jamaica | 2 | 3 | 4 | 9 |
| 6 | Chile | 1 | 0 | 1 | 2 |
| 7 | Canada | 0 | 7 | 3 | 10 |
| 8 | Bahamas | 0 | 2 | 3 | 5 |
| 9 | Dominican Republic | 0 | 1 | 1 | 2 |
| 10 | Argentina | 0 | 1 | 0 | 1 |
| 10 | Costa Rica | 0 | 1 | 0 | 1 |
| 10 | Ecuador | 0 | 1 | 0 | 1 |
| 13 | Colombia | 0 | 0 | 2 | 2 |
| 13 | Puerto Rico | 0 | 0 | 2 | 2 |
| 15 | Venezuela | 0 | 0 | 1 | 1 |
| Totals (15 entries) | | 43 | 43 | 43 | 129 |

== Participating nations ==
- Antigua and Barbuda (11)
- Argentina (10)
- Aruba (1)
- Bahamas (9)
- Barbados (6)
- Belize (4)
- Bermuda (8)
- Bolivia (3)
- Brazil (28)
- British Virgin Islands (3)
- Canada (36)
- Cayman Islands (1)
- Chile (10)
- Colombia (13)
- Costa Rica (2)
- Cuba (38)
- Dominican Republic (4)
- Ecuador (12)
- Haiti (3)
- Grenada (2)
- Guatemala (5)
- Guyana (1)
- Honduras (3)
- Jamaica (17)
- Mexico (29)
- Panama (2)
- Paraguay (3)
- Peru (5)
- Puerto Rico (13)
- El Salvador (5)
- Suriname (2)
- Trinidad and Tobago (6)
- United States (84)
- Virgin Islands (11)
- Uruguay (6)
- Venezuela (9)

== See also ==
- 1987 in athletics (track and field)
