= Lee McRae =

American sprinter

Personal information
- Nationality: United States
- Born: January 17, 1966 (age 60) Pembroke, North Carolina, U.S.

Sport
- Sport: Track & Field
- College team: Pittsburgh Panthers
Medal record
Men's Athletics
Representing the United States
World Championships
Gold medal – first place	1987 Rome	4 × 100 m relay
Pan American Games
Gold medal – first place	1987 Indianapolis	100 metres
Gold medal – first place	1987 Indianapolis	4 × 100 m relay
World Indoor Championships
Gold medal – first place	1987 Indianapolis	60 metres
Summer Universiade
Gold medal – first place	1987 Zagreb	100 metres

Lee McRae (born January 23, 1966) is a retired track and field athlete from the United States who won the gold medal in the men's 100 metres at the 1987 Pan American Games. Lee won three consecutive NCAA indoor national championships (1986–1988) in the 55 meters and the 1986 NCAA Outdoor National Championship in the 100 meters while at the University of Pittsburgh. As a sophomore at Pitt in 1986, he broke Carl Lewis's 55 meter indoor world record by finishing in 6.00 seconds.

A native of Pembroke, North Carolina, McRae attended West Robeson High School.

== Personal bests ==
- 60 yd — 5.99
- 55 m — 6.00 (Former World Record)
- 60 m — 6.50 (Former World Record)
- 100 m — 10.07 (Universiade record)
- 200 m — 20.50/20.44w
