= Floyd Heard =

American sprinter (born 1966)

Personal information
- Full name: Floyd Wayne Heard
- Born: March 24, 1966 (age 60) West Point, Mississippi, U.S.

Sport
- Sport: Track
- Event: Sprints
- College team: Texas A&M
- Club: Santa Monica Track Club
Medal record
Men's Athletics
Representing the United States
Pan American Games
| Gold medal – first place | 1987 Indianapolis | 200 metres |
Summer Universiade
| Gold medal – first place | 1987 Zagreb | 4x100 metre relay |
| Silver medal – second place | 1987 Zagreb | 200 metres |

Floyd Wayne Heard (born March 24, 1966) is a retired track and field sprinter from the United States, best known for setting the 1986 world's best year performance in the men's 200 m. He did so on 7 July 1986 at a meet in Moscow, Soviet Union, clocking 20.12s. A year later he won the title in the men's 200 m at the 1987 Pan American Games.

Heard's personal best for the 200 m was 19.88 seconds, set at the U.S. Olympic Trials in Sacramento on 23 July 2000. That was the race where favorites Michael Johnson and Maurice Greene were pitted as rivals by the media. In a head-to-head battle, both pulled up during the race, leaving Heard to pick up the pieces behind newcomer John Capel, at age 34 becoming the oldest sprinter to make his first American Olympic team.

== Background ==
Heard attended John Marshall High School in Milwaukee, Wisconsin (graduating 1985) and Texas A&M. While at A&M, Heard worked with world-renowned conditioning coach Istvan Javorek.

Floyd Heard also owns the American record as part of the Santa Monica Track Club's scorching performance of 1:18.68 in 1994 in the 4 × 200 m relay run, set at the Mt. SAC Relays. His teammates in that race were Mike Marsh, Leroy Burrell, and Carl Lewis.

Sporting positions
| Preceded by (United States) Lorenzo Daniel | Men's 200 m Best Year Performance; 1986 | Succeeded by (United States) Carl Lewis |
