= List of flag bearers for Mozambique at the Olympics =

Mozambique at the Olympics
- IOC code: MOZ
- NOC: Comité Olímpico Nacional de Moçambique
- Website: com-cga.co.mz (in Portuguese)
- Medals: Gold 1 Silver 0 Bronze 1 Total 2

Summer appearances
- 1980; 1984; 1988; 1992; 1996; 2000; 2004; 2008; 2012; 2016; 2020; 2024

This is a list of flag bearers who have represented Mozambique at the Olympics.

Flag bearers carry the national flag of their country at the opening ceremony of the Olympic Games.

#	Event year	Season	Flag bearer	Sport
1	1980	Summer		
2	1984	Summer	Daniel Firmino	Official
3	1988	Summer	Sergio Fafitine	Swimming
4	1992	Summer		
5	1996	Summer	Maria Mutola	Athletics
6	2000	Summer	Jorge Duvane	Athletics
7	2004	Summer	Kurt Couto	Athletics
8	2008	Summer	Kurt Couto	Athletics
9	2012	Summer	Kurt Couto	Athletics
10	2016	Summer	Joaquim Lobo	Canoeing
11	2020	Summer	Rady Gramane	Boxing
11	2020	Summer	Kevin Loforte	Judo
12	2024	Summer	Alcinda Lucas Dos Santos	Boxing
12	2024	Summer	Matthew Lawrence	Swimming

== See also ==
- Mozambique at the Olympics
