= List of Mozambican records in athletics =

The following are the national records in athletics in Mozambique maintained by Mozambique's national athletics federation: Federação Moçambicana de Atletismo (FMA).

== Outdoor ==
Key to tables: Awaiting ratification Record not kept by FMA Not ratified or later rescinded by FMA

=== Men ===
Event	Record	Athlete	Date	Meet	Place	Ref.
60 m	6.73 A (−1.8 m/s)	Steven Sabino	8 February 2025	Curro Podium Grand Finale & Simbine Classic Shootout	Pretoria, South Africa	
60 m	6.68 A NWI	Steven Sabino	1 February 2025	AGN Track & Field League 2	Pretoria, South Africa	
100 m	10.29 (+1.9 m/s)	Steven Sabino	7 June 2025	ACNW Open League	Potchefstroom, South Africa	
200 m	21.66	Xato José Muinde	30 May 2009		Gaborone, Botswana	
400 m	46.50	Kurt Couto	13 April 2007		Windhoek, Namibia	
800 m	1:46.32	Alberto Mamba	9 June 2016	Bislett Games	Oslo, Norway	
1500 m	3:39.41	Flávio Shoule	13 April 2013	South African Championships	Stellenbosch, South Africa	
Mile	4:05.65 A	Flávio Shoule	20 April 2013		Potchefstroom, South Africa	
3000 m	8:05.64	Flavio Siholhe	9 June 2012	Ibero-American Championships	Barquisimeto, Venezuela	
5000 m	14:26.6	Pedro Mulomo	31 March 1980		Maputo, Mozambique	
10,000 m	30:09.3	Pedro Mulomo	16 May 1982		Maputo, Mozambique	
Half marathon	1:03:58	Flavio Siholhe	25 July 2015		Port Elizabeth, South Africa	
Marathon	2:16:42	Folavio Sehohle	8 May 2022		Durban, South Africa	
110 m hurdles	14.77	Abdul Ismail	27 April 1974		Pretoria, South Africa	
400 m hurdles	49.02	Kurt Couto	11 June 2012	Josef Odložil Memorial	Prague, Czech Republic	
3000 m steeplechase	9:22.32	Hélio Fumo	21 July 2004		Lisbon, Portugal	
High jump	2.00 m A	Chambárson Chambal	19 February 2011	Yellow Pages Invitation Series I	Potchefstroom, South Africa	
High jump	2.00 m	Chambárson Chambal	15 September 2011		Maputo, Mozambique	
Pole vault	4.00 m	Cândido Coelho	28 April 1974		Maputo, Mozambique	
Long jump	7.51 m	Carvalho Machuza	3 July 2006		Windhoek, Namibia	
Triple jump	15.76 m	Pedro Noronha	19 July 1988		Gaborone, Botswana	
Shot put	14.24 m	Emilio Tembe	26 June 1983		Maputo, Mozambique	
Discus throw	46.54 m	Emilio Tembe	15 September 1982		Berlin, West Germany	
Hammer throw	46.51 m	Octávio Vicente	25 November 1962		Maputo, Mozambique	
Javelin throw	60.16 m	Felipe Chaimite	28 August 2016		Maputo, Mozambique	
Decathlon	5848 pts	Cândido Coelho	26–27 July 1978	All-Africa Games	Algiers, Algeria	
Decathlon	100m / Long jump / Shot put / High jump / 400m / 110m H / Discus / Pole vault / Javelin / 1500m; 11.37 / 6.58 m / 9.65 m / 1.79 m / 52.74 / 15.63 / 25.42 m / 3.90 m / 34.94 m / 5:17.03					
20 km walk (road)						
50 km walk (road)						
4 × 100 m relay	41.7 h	Mozambique; Stelio Craveirinha; V. Daniel Hibrahim; Leonardo Loforte; Constantino Reis	11 July 1982		Luanda, Angola	
4 × 100 m relay	41.7 h	Mozambique	3 July 2005	African Southern Region Championships	Harare, Zimbabwe	
4 × 400 m relay	3:08.95	Mozambique; Leonardo Loforte; Pedro Goncalo; Andre Titos; Henrique Ferreira	10 August 1984	Olympic Games	Los Angeles, United States	

=== Women ===
Event	Record	Athlete	Date	Meet	Place	Ref.
100 m	11.61	Elisa Cossa	21 August 2000		Girona, Spain	
200 m	23.86	Maria Mutola	20 July 1994		Langenthal, Switzerland	
400 m	51.37	Maria Mutola	2 August 1994	Herculis	Monaco	
600 m	1:22.87	Maria Mutola	27 August 2002		Liège, Belgium	
800 m	1:55.19	Maria Mutola	17 August 1994	Weltklasse Zürich	Zürich, Switzerland	
1000 m	2:29.34	Maria Mutola	25 August 1995	Memorial Van Damme	Brussels, Belgium	
1500 m	4:01.50	Maria Mutola	12 July 2002	Golden Gala	Rome, Italy	
Mile	4:36.09	Maria Mutola	21 June 1991		Eugene, United States	
2000 m	6:03.84	Maria Mutola	10 July 1992	TSB Grand Prix	London, United Kingdom	
3000 m	9:27.37	Maria Mutola	8 June 1991		Springfield, United States	
5000 m	16:58.22	Leonor Piuza	12 July 2003		Maia, Portugal	
10,000 m	36:49.0 h	Teresa Domingos	24 June 2002		Beira, Mozambique	
Marathon						
100 m hurdles	13.77 (+0.3 m/s)	Cecilia Guambe	15 June 2024	AGN League 7	Pretoria, South Africa	
400 m hurdles	1:03.01	Telma Cossa	25 January 2002		Germiston, South Africa	
3000 m steeplechase						
High jump	1.60 m	Helena Relvas	7 July 1973		Lisbon, Portugal	
High jump	1.60 m	Suzel Abreu	1 June 1974		Maputo, Mozambique	
High jump	1.60 m	Helena Relvas	7 July 2004		Maputo, Mozambique	
Pole vault						
Long jump	6.40 m (+0.2 m/s)	Elisa Cossa	24 March 2000		Pretoria, South Africa	
Triple jump	11.85 m (+1.0 m/s)	Telma Cossa	14 July 2004		Brazzaville, Republic of the Congo	
Shot put	15.63 m	Salomé Mugabe	12 April 2018	Commonwealth Games	Gold Coast, Australia	
Discus throw	47.78 m	Ludovina Oliveira	19 May 1984		Maputo, Mozambique	
Hammer throw	35.77 m	Joana Vasco	4 July 2001		Maputo, Mozambique	
Javelin throw	42.91 m	Salomé Mugabe	7/8 May 2011		Maputo, Mozambique	
Heptathlon	3789 pts	Salomé Mugabe	13–14 September 2011		Maputo, Mozambique	
Heptathlon	100m H / High jump / Shot put / 200m / Long jump / Javelin / 800m; 15.69 / 1.35 m / 13.09 m / 27.33 / 5.09 m / 35.14 m / ?					
Heptathlon	4057 pts (Note: no details available for a conversion from 1971 tables to 1984 tables)	Binta Jambane	14–15 May 1984		Maputo, Mozambique	
Heptathlon	100m H / High jump / Shot put / 200m / Long jump / Javelin / 800m					
20 km walk (road)						
50 km walk (road)						
4 × 100 m relay	47.5 h	Mozambique; Angélica Manaca Dias; Helena Relvas; Argentina Abreu; Conceição Vilhena	29 July 1973		Lisbon, Portugal	
4 × 400 m relay	3:47.6 h	Mozambique	3 July 2005	African Southern Region Championships	Harare, Zimbabwe	

== Indoor ==
=== Men ===
Event	Record	Athlete	Date	Meet	Place	Ref.
60 m	7.28	Artur Augusto	28 January 2006		Espinho, Portugal	
200 m	23.03	Eduardo Francisco	7 March 1993		Braga, Portugal	
400 m	52.15	Diego Mateus Manjate	16 January 2010		Braga, Portugal	
800 m	1:51.97	Amilcar Leal	28 January 2001		Espinho, Portugal	
1500 m	3:51.41	Hélio Fumo	17 February 2007		Espinho, Portugal	
3000 m	8:35.79	Hélio Fumo	6 March 2005		Espinho, Portugal	
60 m hurdles						
High jump	1.75 m	Mussa Pereira	29 January 2011		Pombal, Portugal	
Pole vault						
Long jump	7.28 m	Artur Augusto	18 February 2006		Espinho, Portugal	
Triple jump						
Shot put						
Heptathlon						
Heptathlon	60m / Long jump / Shot put / High jump / 60m H / Pole vault / 1000m					
5000 m walk						
4 × 400 m relay						

=== Women ===
Event	Record	Athlete	Date	Meet	Place	Ref.
60 m						
200 m						
400 m						
800 m	1:57.06	Maria Mutola	21 February 1999	Meeting Pas de Calais	Liévin, France	
800 m	1:56.36 (Note: disallowed for running inside curb)	Maria Mutola	22 February 1998	Meeting Pas de Calais	Liévin, France	
1000 m	2:30.94	Maria Mutola	25 February 1999	GE Galan	Stockholm, Sweden	
1500 m	4:17.93	Maria Mutola	1 February 1992		Portland, United States	
3000 m						
60 m hurdles	8.59	Cecilia Guambe	23 March 2025	World Championships	Nanjing, China	
High jump						
Pole vault						
Long jump						
Triple jump						
Shot put						
Pentathlon						
Pentathlon	60m H / High jump / Shot put / Long jump / 800m					
3000 m walk						
4 × 400 m relay						
