= Mozambique at the 1984 Summer Olympics =

- IOC code: MOZ
- NOC: Comité Olímpico Nacional de Moçambique

in Los Angeles
- Competitors: 9 (8 men and 1 women) in 2 sports
- Flag bearer: Daniel Firmino
- Medals: Gold 0 Silver 0 Bronze 0 Total 0

Summer Olympics appearances (overview)
- 1980; 1984; 1988; 1992; 1996; 2000; 2004; 2008; 2012; 2016; 2020; 2024

Mozambique competed at the 1984 Summer Olympics in Los Angeles, United States.

== Athletics ==
Men
Track & road events

| Athlete | Event | Heat | | Quarterfinal | | Semifinal | | Final | |
| Athlete | Event | Result | Rank | Result | Rank | Result | Rank | Result | Rank |
|---|---|---|---|---|---|---|---|---|---|
| Vicente Daniel | 100 m | 10.81 | 6 | Did not advance | | | | | |
| Henrique Ferreira | 200 m | 21.87 | 5 | Did not advance | | | | | |
| Leonardo Lolorte | 400 m | 47.07 | 4 | Did not advance | | | | | |
| Domingos Mendes | 400 m hurdles | 54.52 | 8 | Did not advance | | | | | |
| André Titos | 800 m | 1:51.73 | 47 | Did not advance | | | | | |
| Leonardo Loforte; Pedro Gonçalvo; André Titos; Henrique Ferreira | 4 × 400 m relay | 3:08.95 NR | 6 | Did not advance | | | | | |

Women
Track & road events

| Athlete | Event | Heat | | Quarterfinal | | Semifinal | | Final | |
| Athlete | Event | Result | Rank | Result | Rank | Result | Rank | Result | Rank |
|---|---|---|---|---|---|---|---|---|---|
| Binta Jambane | 100 m | 12.55 | 5 Q | 12.57 | 8 | Did not advance | | | |
| Binta Jambane | 200 m | 25.14 | 33 | Did not advance | | | | | |

== Swimming ==
Men

| Athlete | Event | Heat | | Final B | | Final A | |
| Athlete | Event | Time | Rank | Time | Rank | Time | Rank |
|---|---|---|---|---|---|---|---|
| Domingos Chivavele | 100 metre freestyle | 1:01.35 | 65 | Did not advance | | | |
| Pedro Cruz | 100 metre backstroke | 1:10.86 | 42 | Did not advance | | | |
| Pedro Cruz | 200 metre individual medley | 2:35.99 | 42 | Did not advance | | | |
