= Athletics at the 1984 Summer Olympics – Men's 4 × 400 metres relay =

Men's 4 × 400 metres relay at the Games of the XXIII Olympiad
- Venue: Los Angeles Memorial Coliseum
- Dates: August 10, 1984 (round 1 & semifinals); August 11, 1984 (final)
- Competitors: 109 from 25 nations
- Winning time: 2:57.91

Medalists
1st place, gold medalist(s)		Ray Armstead, Alonzo Babers, Antonio McKay, Sunder Nix, Walter McCoy*, Willie Smith* * only competed in the preliminary heats.	United States
2nd place, silver medalist(s)		Kriss Akabusi, Todd Bennett, Garry Cook, Phil Brown	Great Britain
3rd place, bronze medalist(s)		Kriss Akabusi, Todd Bennett, Garry Cook, Phil Brown	Nigeria

The 4 × 400 metres relay races at the 1984 Summer Olympics was contested as part of the athletics program.

== Summary ==
The final saw Sunday Uti start off with a strong leg in lane 7, giving the Nigerian team the lead going in to the first handoff. Moses Ugbusien took the baton rather casually, the slow start giving Darren Clark the chance to pass during the curve, putting Australia into the lead at the break. Taking an efficient tangent from lane 8, Ray Armstead gained ground on Ugbusien, moving to his shoulder to try to make a pass for the Americans on the stretch, 4 meters behind Clark who was running a 43.86 split, which exactly equalled Lee Evans' world record at the time. Ugbusien didn't relent and the two teams passed virtually even. On the handoff, Alonzo Babers got the edge, trying to keep up with Rotimi Peters. The long striding Babers took off in pursuit of Gary Minihan, with the three teams well ahead of the next pursuing team from Great Britain. Coming off the final turn, Babers smoothly went past Minihan and pulled away to a 7-meter lead by the handoff to Antonio McKay. Behind the action at the front, Todd Bennett steadily chipped away what was more than a 10-meter deficit to put Britain but a step behind Nigeria at the final handoff. McKay kept the American lead for the victory. There was a battle for the other medals, with Rick Mitchell holding the Australian advantage of about two meters over Innocent Egbunike for Nigeria, with Phil Brown another step back for Britain. With Egbunike training at an American university Azusa Pacific, he was quite familiar to the spectators. Down the backstretch, Egbunike gained on Mitchell, moving on to his outside shoulder to pounce coming off the final turn. Behind Egbunike, Brown was staying in close contact still on the inside. Then, as Egbunike attacked, Brown went to the outside making it three abreast with 70 meters to go. Mitchell couldn't keep up, but Egbunike and Brown ran stride for stride for 50 meters. In the final 20 meters, Brown gained a slight advantage and crossed the line ahead for the silver medal. Nigeria's consolation was the African continental record.

== Abbreviations ==
Q	automatic qualification
q	qualification by rank
DNS	did not start
NM	no mark
OR	olympic record
WR	world record
AR	area record
NR	national record
PB	personal best
SB	season best

== Records ==
These were the standing world and Olympic records (in minutes) prior to the 1984 Summer Olympics.

World record	2:56.16	(United States) Vincent Matthews (United States) Ron Freeman (United States) Larry James (United States) Lee Evans	Mexico City (MEX)	October 20, 1968
Olympic record	2:56.16	(United States) Vincent Matthews (United States) Ron Freeman (United States) Larry James (United States) Lee Evans	Mexico City (MEX)	October 20, 1968

== Results ==
=== Final ===
Rank	Team	Name	Result	Notes
1st place, gold medalist(s)	United States	Sunder Nix, Ray Armstead, Alonzo Babers, Antonio McKay	2:57.91	
2nd place, silver medalist(s)	Great Britain	Kriss Akabusi, Garry Cook, Todd Bennett, Phil Brown	2:59.13	
3rd place, bronze medalist(s)	Nigeria	Sunday Uti, Moses Ugbusien, Rotimi Peters, Innocent Egbunike	2:59.32	
4	Australia	Bruce Frayne, Darren Clark, Gary Minihan, Rick Mitchell	2:59.70	NR
5	Italy	Roberto Tozzi, Ernesto Nocco, Roberto Ribaud, Pietro Mennea	3:01.44	
6	Barbados	Richard Louis, David Peltier, Clyde Edwards, Elvis Forde	3:01.60	NR
7	Uganda	John Goville, Moses Kyeswa, Peter Rwamuhanda, Mike Okot	3:02.09	NR
8	Canada	Michael Sokolowski, Doug Hinds, Brian Saunders, Tim Béthune	3:02.82	

=== Semi-final ===
Heat 1

Rank	Team	Name	Result	Notes
1	United States	Sunder Nix, Walter McCoy, Willie Smith, Antonio McKay	3:00.19	Q
2	Great Britain	Kriss Akabusi, Garry Cook, Todd Bennett, Phil Brown	3:02.98	Q
3	Canada	Michael Sokolowski, Doug Hinds, Brian Saunders, Tim Béthune	3:03:93	Q
4	Uganda	John Goville, Moses Kyeswa, Peter Rwamuhanda, Mike Okot	3:04.02	Q
5	West Germany	Martin Weppler, Uwe Schmitt, Jörg Vaihinger, Erwin Skamrahl	3:04.69	
6	Ivory Coast	Georges Kablan Degnan, Avognan Nogboum, René Djédjémel Mélédjé, Gabriel Tiacoh	3:04.87	
7	Sweden	Tommy Johansson, Erik Josjö, Christer Gullstrand, Thomas Nyberg	3:09.40	
8	Japan	Susumu Takano, Shigenori Omori, Ryoichi Yoshida, Hiroki Fuwa	3:10.73	

Heat 2

Rank	Team	Name	Result	Notes
1	Nigeria	Sunday Uti, Moses Ugbusien, Rotimi Peters, Innocent Egbunike	3:02.22	Q
2	Australia	Peter Van Miltenburg, Gary Minihan, Bruce Frayne, Darren Clark	3:03:79	Q
3	Italy	Roberto Tozzi, Ernesto Nocco, Roberto Ribaud, Donato Sabia	3:03:87	Q
4	Barbados	Richard Louis, David Peltier, Clyde Edwards, Elvis Forde	3:03:89	Q
5	Brazil	João Batista da Silva, Wilson David Santos, José-Luiz Barbosa, Gerson A. Souza	3:03:99	
6	Jamaica	Steve Griffiths, Mark Senior, Karl Smith, Devon Morris	3:04.24	
7	Kenya	John Anzrah, Elijah Sogomo, Jason Opicho, David Kitur	3:04.74	

=== Heats ===
Heat 1

Rank	Team	Name	Result	Notes
1	Australia	Peter Van Miltenburg, Gary Minihan, Bruce Frayne, Rick Mitchell	3:03:72	Q
2	Canada	Michael Sokolowski, Doug Hinds, Brian Saunders, Tim Béthune	3:04.47	Q
3	Trinidad and Tobago	Anton Skerritt, Michael Puckerin, Derek Archer, Michael Paul	3:06.81	q
4	Sweden	Tommy Johansson, Erik Josjö, Christer Gullstrand, Thomas Nyberg	3:07.32	q
5	Japan	Shigenori Omori, Ryoichi Yoshida, Hiroki Fuwa, Susumu Takano	3:08.16	q
6	Mozambique	Leonardo Loforte, Pedro Gonçalvo, André Titos, Henrique Ferreira	3:08.95	NR
7	United Arab Emirates	Rashid Al-Jirbi, Ibrahim Khamis, Mubarak Ismail Amber, Ibrahim Aziz	3:19.90	

Heat 2

Rank	Team	Name	Result	Notes
1	Great Britain	(Kriss Akabusi, Garry Cook, Todd Bennett, Phil Brown)	3:06.10	Q
2	Italy	(Roberto Ribaud, Ernesto Nocco, Mauro Zuliani, Donato Sabia)	3:06.28	Q
3	Uganda	(John Goville, Moses Kyeswa, Peter Rwamuhanda, Mike Okot)	3:06.65	q
4	France	(Yann Quentrec, Didier Dubois, Jacques Fellice, Aldo Canti)	3:08.33	
5	Antigua and Barbuda	(Alfred Browne, Larry Miller, Howard Lindsay, Dale Jones)	3:10.95	
6	British Virgin Islands	(Guy Hill, Jerry Molyneaux, Dean Greenaway, Lindel Hodge)	3:11.89	
7	Cameroon	(Ernest Tché-Noubossie, Jean-Pierre Abossolo-Ze, Barnabe Messomo, Mama Moluh)	3:16.00	

Heat 3

Rank	Team	Name	Result	Notes
1	Barbados	Richard Louis, David Peltier, Clyde Edwards, Elvis Forde	3:03:31	Q
2	West Germany	Martin Weppler, Uwe Schmitt, Thomas Giessing, Erwin Skamrahl	3:03:33	Q
3	Ivory Coast	Georges Kablan Degnan, Avognan Nogboum, René Djédjémel Mélédjé, Gabriel Tiacoh	3:03:50	q NR
4	Jamaica	Steve Griffiths, Mark Senior, Dennis Wallace, Devon Morris	3:03:85	q
5	Brazil	(João Batista da Silva, José Luíz Barbosa, Antônio Dias Ferreira, Gerson A. Souza)	3:05.08	q

Heat 4

Rank	Team	Name	Result	Notes
1	United States	(Willie Smith, Ray Armstead, Alonzo Babers, Walter McCoy)	3:01.44	Q
2	Kenya	(John Anzrah, Simon Kitur, Jason Opicho, Elijah Sogomo)	3:06.07	Q
3	Nigeria	(Sunday Uti, Moses Ugbusien, Rotimi Peters, Innocent Egbunike)	3:06.34	q
4	Spain	(Manuel González, Benjamín González, Antonio Sánchez, Angel Heras)	3:08.79	
5	Oman	(Barakat Al-Sharji, Amor Alheshimi, Sulaiman Alakbary, Mohamed Amer Al-Malky)	3:15.87	

== See also ==
- Athletics at the Friendship Games – Men's 4 × 400 metres relay
