= African Zone VI Athletics Championships =

International athletics competition

- Genre: outdoor track and field
- Frequency: annual
- Venue: varies
- Inaugurated: 1987
- Most recent: 1995
- Participants: Southern African nations
- Organiser: Confederation of African Athletics

The African Zone VI Athletics Championships was an annual international athletics competition between Southern African nations, organised by the Confederation of African Athletics (CAA). First held in 1987, it was held each year until 1990 and discontinued completely after 1995, as it was replaced by the African Southern Region Athletics Championships, due to the CAA changing its regional championship formatting.

An African Zone VI Marathon Championships was also held on one occasion in 1989. It was hosted by Swaziland in Mbabane and the hosts won both the men's individual and team titles, led by Tom Dlamini in 2:24:34 hours.

== Editions ==
| Edition | Year | City | Country | Date | Nations | Athletes |
|---|---|---|---|---|---|---|
| 1 | 1987 | Harare | Zimbabwe | | | |
| 2 | 1988 | Gaborone | Botswana | | | |
| 3 | 1989 | Luanshya | Zambia | | | |
| 4 | 1990 | Windhoek | Namibia | | | |
| 5 | 1995 | Harare | Zimbabwe | | | |

== Events ==
The competition programme features 34 regular athletics events: seven track running events, two obstacle events, three jumps, three throws, and two relays for both the sexes.

Track running

- 100 metres, 200 metres, 400 metres, 800 metres, 1500 metres, 5000 metres, 10,000 metres

Obstacle events

- 100 metres hurdles (women only), 110 metres hurdles (men only), 400 metres hurdles,

Jumping events

- High jump, long jump, triple jump

Throwing events

- Shot put, discus throw, javelin throw, hammer throw (men only)

Relay races

- 4 × 100 metres relay, 4 × 400 metres relay

A men's 20K run was included in 1987 and 1989. A men's decathlon was held in 1990 and in 1989 a men's nonathlon (no pole vault) and women's heptathlon was held. A men's 5000 metres race walk was contested in 1990. Men's pole vault was held on three occasions only, and women never competed in this event. A women's 400 m hurdles was first held in 1989 and a women's triple jump was introduced in 1995. For the first four editions, women competed in the 3000 metres rather than the standard 5000 m. A women's 4 × 200 metres relay was held once in 1989.

== Participation ==
- Botswana
- Eswatini
- Mozambique
- Namibia
- Zambia
- Zimbabwe

== Men's champions ==
=== 100 metres ===
- 1987: Patson Muderedzi (ZIM)
- 1988: Henry Ngolwe (ZAM)
- 1989: Fabian Muyaba (ZIM)
- 1990: Fabian Muyaba (ZIM)
- 1995: Tawanda Chiwira (ZIM)

=== 200 metres ===
- 1987: Patson Muderedzi (ZIM)
- 1988: Patson Muderedzi (ZIM)
- 1989: Fabian Muyaba (ZIM)
- 1990: Fabian Muyaba (ZIM)
- 1995: Tawanda Chiwira (ZIM)

=== 400 metres ===
- 1987: Elijah Nkala (ZIM)
- 1988: Elijah Nkala (ZIM)
- 1989: Elijah Nkala (ZIM)
- 1990: Camera Ntereke (BOT)
- 1995: Philip Mukomana (ZIM)

=== 800 metres ===
- 1987: Douglas Kalembo (ZAM)
- 1988: Kebapetse Gaseitsiwe (BOT)
- 1989: Alick Musukuma (ZAM)
- 1990: Savieri Ngidhi (ZIM)
- 1995: Zibusiso Nyoni (ZIM)

=== 1500 metres ===
- 1987: John Katebula (ZAM)
- 1988: Philemon Harineki (ZIM)
- 1989: Philemon Harineki (ZIM)
- 1990: Savieri Ngidhi (ZIM)
- 1995: Abel Chimukoko (ZIM)

=== 5000 metres ===
- 1987: Melusi Ndhlela (ZIM)
- 1988: Stanley Mandebele (ZIM)
- 1989: Charles Mulinga (ZAM)
- 1990: Charles Mulinga (ZAM)
- 1995: Josphat Mhande (ZIM)

=== 10,000 metres ===
- 1987: Francis Mukuka (ZAM)
- 1988: Zephaniah Ncube (ZIM)
- 1989: Sebio Sikanyika (ZAM)
- 1990: H. Vincent (ZIM)
- 1995: Kingstone Maringe (ZIM)

=== 20K run ===
- 1987: Francis Mukuka (ZAM)
- 1988: Not held
- 1989: Muchapiwa Mazano (ZIM)

=== 3000 metres steeplechase ===
- 1987: Humphrey Bwalya (ZAM)
- 1988: Melusi Ndhlela (ZIM)
- 1989: Michael Mwango (ZAM)
- 1990: Passmore Furusa (ZIM)
- 1995: Emmanuel Matashu (ZIM)

=== 110 metres hurdles ===
- 1987: Stanley Flowers (ZIM)
- 1988: Not held
- 1989: Wellington Mandaza (ZIM)
- 1990: Jaco van Wyk (NAM)
- 1995: Benjamin Songoya (ZIM)

=== 400 metres hurdles ===
- 1987: Agrippa Chidziva (ZIM)
- 1988: Not held
- 1989: Domingos Mendes (MOZ)
- 1990: Jaco van Wyk (NAM)
- 1995: Julius Masvanise (ZIM)

=== High jump ===
- 1987: Troy McNamara (ZIM)
- 1988: Takawira Mubako (ZIM)
- 1989: Troy McNamara (ZIM)
- 1990: Max Schäffer (NAM)
- 1995: Juma Phiri (ZIM)

=== Pole vault ===
- 1987: Charles Kawara (ZIM)
- 1988: Not held
- 1989: Not held
- 1990: G. Rowland (NAM)
- 1995: Stanley Flowers (ZIM)

=== Long jump ===
- 1987: Stanley Flowers (ZIM)
- 1988: Stélio Craveirinha (MOZ)
- 1989: Stélio Craveirinha (MOZ)
- 1990: Eddie Haosemab (NAM)
- 1995: Sizwe Mdluli (SWZ)

=== Triple jump ===
- 1987: Paulo Noronha (MOZ)
- 1988: Paulo Noronha (MOZ)
- 1989: Paulo Noronha (MOZ)
- 1990: Sizwe Mdluli (SWZ)
- 1995: Sizwe Mdluli (SWZ)

=== Shot put ===
- 1987: John Banda (ZAM)
- 1988: John Banda (ZAM)
- 1989: John Banda (ZAM)
- 1990: Hansie Booysen (NAM)
- 1995: Brighton Nyathi (ZIM)

=== Discus throw ===
- 1987: Stephen Chikomo (ZIM)
- 1988: Stephen Chikomo (ZIM)
- 1989: Stephen Chikomo (ZIM)
- 1990: Hansie Booysen (NAM)
- 1995: Allan Nyoni (ZIM)

=== Hammer throw ===
- 1987: Michael Lambourn (ZIM)
- 1988: Not held
- 1989: Not held
- 1990: Hansie Booysen (NAM)
- 1995: Nicholas Mpofu (ZIM)

=== Javelin throw ===
- 1987: Stanley Flowers (ZIM)
- 1988: Stanley Flowers (ZIM)
- 1989: Simon Kamanga (ZAM)
- 1990: I. Lungameni (NAM)
- 1995: Roland Vermeulen (ZIM)

=== Combined events ===
A nonathlon was held in 1989, featuring the same events as the decathlon minus the pole vault, before a full decathlon was held in 1990

- 1989: Kelvin Nchimunya (ZAM)
- 1990: Christopher Hentzen (NAM)

=== 5000 metres walk ===
- 1990: S. Magotsi (NAM)

=== 4 × 100 metres relay ===
- 1987: Zimbabwe (ZIM)
- 1988: Zambia (ZAM)
- 1989: Zimbabwe (ZIM)
- 1990: Zimbabwe (ZIM)
- 1995: Zimbabwe (ZIM)

=== 4 × 400 metres relay ===
- 1987: Zambia (ZAM)
- 1988: Zambia (ZAM)
- 1989: Zimbabwe (ZIM)
- 1990: Zimbabwe (ZIM)
- 1995: Zimbabwe (ZIM)

== Women's champions ==
=== 100 metres ===
- 1987: Marcelle Riddle (ZIM)
- 1988: Gaily Dube (ZIM)
- 1989: Gaily Dube (ZIM)
- 1990: Jesper Chalwe (ZAM)
- 1995: Philipa Chidziva (ZIM)

=== 200 metres ===
- 1987: Marcelle Riddle (ZIM)
- 1988: Gaily Dube (ZIM)
- 1989: Gaily Dube (ZIM)
- 1990: Adridah Sakala (ZAM)
- 1995: Simangele Ncube (ZIM)

=== 400 metres ===
- 1987: Ausa Mwendachabe (ZAM)
- 1988: Maria Mutola (MOZ)
- 1989: Ausa Mwendachabe (ZAM)
- 1990: Thokozile Moyo (ZIM)
- 1995: Ausa Mwendachabe (ZAM)

=== 800 metres ===
- 1987: Ausa Mwendachabe (ZAM)
- 1988: Maria Mutola (MOZ)
- 1989: Ausa Mwendachabe (ZAM)
- 1990: Florence Himoonza (ZAM)
- 1995: Julia Sakara (ZIM)

=== 1500 metres ===
- 1987: Tracy Gutu (ZIM)
- 1988: Julia Sakara (ZIM)
- 1989: Maria Mutola (MOZ)
- 1990: Julia Sakara (ZIM)
- 1995: Julia Sakara (ZIM)

=== 3000 metres ===
- 1987: Tracy Gutu (ZIM)
- 1988: Julia Sakara (ZIM)
- 1989: Marvis Chiloshya (ZAM)
- 1990: Julia Sakara (ZIM)

=== 5000 metres ===
- 1995: Letiwe Marakurwa (ZIM)

=== 10,000 metres ===
- 1987: Joyce Chilongwe (ZIM)
- 1988: Not held
- 1989: Gertrude Chikwanda (ZAM)
- 1990: Julia Sakara (ZIM)
- 1995: Loveness Chikombingo (ZIM)

=== 100 metres hurdles ===
- 1987: F. Hassin (ZIM)
- 1988: Not held
- 1989: Tstitsi Marufu (ZIM)
- 1990: J. van As (NAM)
- 1995: Dafros Mudyirwa (ZIM)

=== 400 metres hurdles ===
- 1989: Exhildah Bunda (ZAM)
- 1990: Exhildah Bunda (ZAM)
- 1995: Taizivei Mashava (ZIM)

=== High jump ===
- 1987: Tambudzai Kamukosi (ZIM)
- 1988: Nathalie Beru (ZIM)
- 1989: Tambudzai Kamukosi (ZIM)
- 1990: Annerie de Klerk (NAM)
- 1995: Madeleine Joubert (NAM)

=== Long jump ===
- 1987: F. Hassin (ZIM)
- 1988: Brenda Currin (ZIM)
- 1989: Cynthia Masiwa (ZIM)
- 1990: Ronel Moolman (NAM)
- 1995: Dafros Mudyirwa (ZIM)

=== Triple jump ===
- 1995: Trina Brand (NAM)

=== Shot put ===
- 1987: Hildah Ndeke (ZAM)
- 1988: Ludovina de Oliveira (MOZ)
- 1989: Felistas Mwape (ZAM)
- 1990: Felistas Mwape (ZAM)
- 1995: Rutendo Kukutwa (ZIM)

=== Discus throw ===
- 1987: Morgan Warner (ZIM)
- 1988: Ludovina de Oliveira (MOZ)
- 1989: Ludovina de Oliveira (MOZ)
- 1990: Wilna van Vuuren (NAM)
- 1995: Rutendo Kukutwa (ZIM)

=== Javelin throw ===
- 1987: Brenda Currin (ZIM)
- 1988: Brenda Currin (ZIM)
- 1989: Effie Chirisa (ZIM)
- 1990: Dalene Botha (NAM)
- 1995: Chido Chitsatso (ZIM)

=== Heptathlon ===
- 1989: Carol Muwowo (ZAM)

=== 4 × 100 metres relay ===
- 1987: Zimbabwe (ZIM)
- 1988: Zimbabwe (ZIM)
- 1989: Zambia (ZAM)
- 1990: Zambia (ZAM)
- 1995: Zimbabwe (ZIM)

=== 4 × 200 metres relay ===
- 1989: Zambia (ZAM)

=== 4 × 400 metres relay ===
- 1988: Mozambique (MOZ)
- 1989: Zambia (ZAM)
- 1990: Zambia (ZAM)
- 1995: Zimbabwe (ZIM)
