= Mozambique at the 1980 Summer Olympics =

- IOC code: MOZ
- NOC: Comité Olímpico Nacional de Moçambique

in Moscow
- Competitors: 14 (12 men and 2 women) in 2 sports
- Flag bearer: Abdul Ismail
- Medals: Gold 0 Silver 0 Bronze 0 Total 0

Summer Olympics appearances (overview)
- 1980; 1984; 1988; 1992; 1996; 2000; 2004; 2008; 2012; 2016; 2020; 2024

Mozambique competed in the Olympic Games for the first time at the 1980 Summer Olympics in Moscow, USSR.

== Athletics ==
Men
Track & road events

Athlete	Event	Heat		Quarterfinal		Semifinal		Final	
Athlete	Event	Result	Rank	Result	Rank	Result	Rank	Result	Rank
Dias Alface	10000 m	DNF		Did not advance					
Eduardo Costa	100 m	11.02	5	Did not advance					
Abdul Ismail	110 m hurdles	15.18	7	Did not advance					
Pedro Mulomo	5000 m	15:11.9	11	Did not advance					
Constantino Reis	200 m	DNS		Did not advance					
Vicente Santos	1500 m	3:58.7	9	Did not advance					

Field events

Athlete	Event	Qualification		Final	
Athlete	Event	Distance	Position	Distance	Position
Stelio Craveirinha	Long jump	6.94	27	Did not advance	

Women
Track & road events

Athlete	Event	Heat		Quarterfinal		Semifinal		Final	
Athlete	Event	Result	Rank	Result	Rank	Result	Rank	Result	Rank
Acacia Mate	400 m	1:00.90	8	Did not advance					
Acacia Mate	800 m	2:19.7	7	Did not advance					

Field events

Athlete	Event	Qualification		Final	
Athlete	Event	Distance	Position	Distance	Position
Ludovina de Oliveira	Discus throw	NM	AC	Did not advance	

== Swimming ==
Men

Athlete	Event	Heat		Semifinal		Final	
Athlete	Event	Time	Rank	Time	Rank	Time	Rank
Pedro Cruz	100 metre backstroke	1:15.25	33	—		Did not advance	
Raimundo Franisse	100 metre butterfly	1:01.83	29	—		Did not advance	
Raimundo Franisse	200 metre butterfly	2:25.55	24	—		Did not advance	
Ntewane Machel	200 metre freestyle	2:35.45	37	—		Did not advance	
Edgar Martins	100 metre freestyle	1:06.17	39	—		Did not advance	
Rogerio Silva	100 metre breaststroke	1:25.70	25	—		Did not advance	
