= Athletics at the 1988 Summer Olympics – Men's 400 metres =

Men's 400 metres at the Games of the XXIV Olympiad
- Athletics
- Venue: Olympic Stadium
- Dates: September 24 (heats); September 25 (quarter-finals); September 26 (semi-finals); September 28 (final)
- Competitors: 75 from 55 nations
- Winning time: 43.87

Medalists
1st place, gold medalist(s)		Steve Lewis; United States
2nd place, silver medalist(s)		Butch Reynolds; United States
3rd place, bronze medalist(s)		Danny Everett; United States

The men's 400 metres at the 1988 Summer Olympics in Seoul, South Korea took place between 24 and 28 September 1988. Seventy-five athletes from 55 nations competed. The maximum number of athletes per nation had been set at three since the 1930 Olympic Congress. The event was won by 0.06 seconds by Steve Lewis of the United States, the second in what would ultimately be seven consecutive American victories stretching from 1984 to 2008. The United States swept the podium in the event for the third time, having previously done so in 1904 and 1968.

== Summary ==
It always promised to be a classic. The clear favourite was the legendary American Harry "Butch" Reynolds. He had set a new world record of 43.29 seconds six weeks before. Reynolds breezed through the heats and into the final.

The final, ran on Thursday September 28, 1988, started somewhat as expected, with Reynolds holding back and saving himself for his normal strong finish. To the surprise of most watching a young American Steve Lewis went out strong from the start and gave Reynolds a run for his money. Entering the home straight Lewis was leading and Reynolds charging back at him but Reynolds left it too late and the 19yr old Lewis hung on for victory in an amazing time of 43.87sec. Reynolds finished second and Danny Everett third for an American sweep. The same trio was also involved with Kevin Robinzine in winning the 4 × 400 m relay.

The career of Lewis was blighted by injury although he did compete in the 1992 Summer Olympics in Barcelona, Spain, placing second in 400m and being part of the American quartet who took gold in 4 × 400 m relay.

== Background ==
This was the 21st appearance of the event, which is one of 12 athletics events to have been held at every Summer Olympics. None of the Americans from 1984 returned, but all five non-American finalists did: silver medalist Gabriel Tiacoh of the Ivory Coast, fourth-place finisher Darren Clark of Australia, sixth-place finisher Sunday Uti and seventh-place finisher Innocent Egbunike of Nigeria, and Bert Cameron of Jamaica (who had qualified for but did not start the Los Angeles final due to injury). The new American team was favored, however; Butch Reynolds had just broken the 20-year-old world record, and Danny Everett and Steve Lewis were strong contenders. The 1987 world champion, Thomas Schönlebe of East Germany, was also a significant challenger.

Bangladesh, Honduras, Indonesia, the Maldives, Mali, Saint Vincent and the Grenadines, South Korea, Vanuatu, the (U.S.) Virgin Islands, and Zaire appeared in this event for the first time; the Republic of China had previously competed, but now appeared as Chinese Taipei for the first time. The United States made its 20th appearance, most of any nation, having missed only the boycotted 1980 Games.

== Competition format ==
The competition retained the basic four-round format from 1920. The "fastest loser" system, introduced in 1964, was used for the first round. There were 10 first-round heats, each with 7 or 8 runners. The top three runners in each heat advanced, along with the next two fastest overall. The 32 quarterfinalists were divided into 4 quarterfinals with 8 runners each; the top four athletes in each quarterfinal heat advanced to the semifinals, with no "fastest loser" spots. The semifinals featured 2 heats of 8 runners each. The top four runners in each semifinal heat advanced, making an eight-man final.

== Records ==
These were the standing world and Olympic records (in seconds) prior to the 1976 Summer Olympics.

World record	Butch Reynolds (USA)	43.29	Zürich, Switzerland	17 August 1988
Olympic record	Lee Evans (USA)	43.86	Mexico City, Mexico	18 October 1968

No world or Olympic records were set during this event.

== Schedule ==
Following the 1984 schedule, the event was held on four separate days, with each round being on a different day.

All times are Korea Standard Time adjusted for daylight savings (UTC+10)

Date	Time	Round
Saturday, 24 September 1988	9:30	Round 1
Sunday, 25 September 1988	12:20	Quarterfinals
Monday, 26 September 1988	15:45	Semifinals
Wednesday, 28 September 1988	12:55	Final

== Results ==
=== Round 1 ===
==== Heat 1 ====
Rank	Lane	Athlete	Nation	Time	Notes
1	2	Todd Bennett	Great Britain	46.37	Q
2	7	Miles Murphy	Australia	46.38	Q
3	3	Anton Skerritt	Canada	46.64	Q
4	4	Richard Louis	Barbados	46.80	
5	8	Felix Sandy	Sierra Leone	46.82	
6	5	Gustavo Envela	Equatorial Guinea	48.11	
7	6	Joe Rodan	Fiji	48.69	
8	1	Odiya Silweya	Malawi	49.73	

==== Heat 2 ====
Rank	Lane	Athlete	Nation	Time	Notes
1	7	Brian Whittle	Great Britain	46.07	Q
2	6	Gaietà Cornet	Spain	46.16	Q
3	3	Butch Reynolds	United States	46.28	Q
4	4	Seibert Straughn	Barbados	47.37	
5	1	Filipe Lombá	Portugal	47.57	
6	5	Ali Faudet	Chad	48.69	
7	2	Baptiste Firiam	Vanuatu	51.77	

==== Heat 3 ====
Rank	Lane	Athlete	Nation	Time	Notes
1	3	Mohamed Amer Al-Malki	Oman	46.79	Q
2	6	Lucas Sang	Kenya	46.85	Q
3	2	Ousmane Diarra	Senegal	46.86	Q
4	4	Douglas Kalembo	Zambia	47.44	
5	8	Mohamed Hossain Milzer	Bangladesh	48.76	
6	1	Akossi Gnalo	Togo	51.46	
—	7	Sérgio de Menezes	Brazil	DNF	
—	—	William Taramai	Cook Islands	DNS	

==== Heat 4 ====
Rank	Lane	Athlete	Nation	Time	Notes
1	1	Ian Morris	Trinidad and Tobago	45.84	Q
2	4	Thomas Schönlebe	East Germany	47.07	Q
3	2	Sunday Uti	Nigeria	47.08	Q
4	3	Lin Kuang-liang	Chinese Taipei	48.18	
5	8	Ernest Tché-Noubossie	Cameroon	48.31	
6	7	Haji Bakr Al-Qahtani	Saudi Arabia	48.53	
7	6	Enock Musonda	Zambia	49.21	
8	5	Ahmed Shageef	Maldives	50.61	

==== Heat 5 ====
Rank	Lane	Athlete	Nation	Time	Notes
1	7	Steve Lewis	United States	45.31	Q
2	6	Jens Carlowitz	East Germany	45.64	Q
3	3	Gabriel Tiacoh	Ivory Coast	47.19	Q
4	5	Jean-Didiace Bémou	Republic of the Congo	48.46	
5	2	Abdullah Ali Ahmed	Libya	48.89	
6	4	Jonathan Chipalo	Zambia	48.97	
7	1	Maher Abbas	Lebanon	51.29	
8	8	Carlton Usher	Belize	51.42	

==== Heat 6 ====
Rank	Lane	Athlete	Nation	Time	Notes
1	6	Gérson de Souza	Brazil	45.90	Q
2	2	Howard Davis	Jamaica	45.97	Q
3	8	Takale Tuna	Papua New Guinea	47.87	Q
4	7	Sunday Maweni	Botswana	47.97	
5	5	Sulaiman Juma Al-Habsi	Oman	48.30	
6	3	Nordin Mohamed Jadi	Malaysia	49.52	
7	1	Michael Williams	Saint Vincent and the Grenadines	51.22	

==== Heat 7 ====
Rank	Lane	Athlete	Nation	Time	Notes
1	7	Darren Clark	Australia	45.93	Q
2	5	Simeon Kipkemboi	Kenya	46.15	Q
3	3	Elvis Forde	Barbados	46.47	Q
4	4	Elijah Nkala	Zimbabwe	46.60	
5	1	Antonio Sánchez	Spain	47.18	
6	6	Jaime Rodrigues	Mozambique	47.33	
7	2	Aouf Abdul Rahman Youssef	Iraq	47.45	
8	8	Desai Wynter	Virgin Islands	48.39	

==== Heat 8 ====
Rank	Lane	Athlete	Nation	Time	Notes
1	3	Bert Cameron	Jamaica	46.24	Q
2	2	Rob Stone	Australia	46.52	Q
3	6	Dawda Jallow	The Gambia	46.91	Q
4	8	Yun Nam-han	South Korea	47.02	
5	1	John Goville	Uganda	47.11	
6	5	Muhammad Fayyaz	Pakistan	47.13	
7	7	Yaya Seyba	Mali	48.83	
8	4	Alfred Browne	Antigua and Barbuda	48.92	

==== Heat 9 ====
Rank	Lane	Athlete	Nation	Time	Notes
1	1	Danny Everett	United States	45.63	Q
2	3	Devon Morris	Jamaica	45.95	Q
3	2	Tomasz Jędrusik	Poland	46.12	Q
4	6	Patrick Delice	Trinidad and Tobago	46.14	q
5	5	Slobodan Branković	Yugoslavia	46.59	
6	7	Jorge Fidel Ponce	Honduras	51.11	
—	8	Mwana Bute Kasongo	Zaire	DSQ	

==== Heat 10 ====
Rank	Lane	Athlete	Nation	Time	Notes
1	5	Susumu Takano	Japan	45.42	Q
2	7	Troy Douglas	Bermuda	45.69	Q
3	4	Innocent Egbunike	Nigeria	46.02	Q
4	6	Elkana Nyangau	Kenya	46.25	q
5	3	Ismail Mačev	Yugoslavia	46.37	
6	8	Elieser Wattebosi	Indonesia	47.10	
7	2	Willis Todman	British Virgin Islands	50.11	

=== Quarterfinals ===
==== Quarterfinal 1 ====
Rank	Lane	Athlete	Nation	Time	Notes
1	6	Ian Morris	Trinidad and Tobago	44.70	Q
2	3	Jens Carlowitz	East Germany	45.09	Q
3	4	Brian Whittle	Great Britain	45.22	Q
4	5	Tomasz Jędrusik	Poland	45.27	Q
5	7	Sunday Uti	Nigeria	45.33	
6	2	Miles Murphy	Australia	45.93	
7	1	Dawda Jallow	The Gambia	46.35	
8	8	Elvis Forde	Barbados	46.59	

==== Quarterfinal 2 ====
Rank	Lane	Athlete	Nation	Time	Notes
1	5	Danny Everett	United States	44.33	Q
2	6	Innocent Egbunike	Nigeria	45.02	Q
3	7	Thomas Schönlebe	East Germany	45.09	Q
4	8	Bert Cameron	Jamaica	45.16	Q
5	3	Simeon Kipkemboi	Kenya	45.44	
6	2	Todd Bennett	Great Britain	45.96	
7	1	Ousmane Diarra	Senegal	46.23	
8	4	Troy Douglas	Bermuda	46.28	

==== Quarterfinal 3 ====
Rank	Time	Athlete	Nation	Time	Notes
1	5	Steve Lewis	United States	44.41	Q
2	3	Darren Clark	Australia	44.96	Q
3	8	Mohamed Amer Al-Malki	Oman	45.01	Q
4	6	Devon Morris	Jamaica	45.30	Q
5	4	Gaietà Cornet	Spain	45.39	
6	2	Anton Skerritt	Canada	46.08	
7	1	Elkana Nyangau	Kenya	46.09	
8	7	Takale Tuna	Papua New Guinea	47.48	

==== Quarterfinal 4 ====
Rank	Lane	Athlete	Nation	Time	Notes
1	1	Butch Reynolds	United States	44.46	Q
2	3	Susumu Takano	Japan	45.00	Q
3	5	Gérson de Souza	Brazil	45.35	Q
4	6	Howard Davis	Jamaica	45.40	Q
5	7	Gabriel Tiacoh	Ivory Coast	45.49	
6	8	Lucas Sang	Kenya	45.72	
7	4	Patrick Delice	Trinidad and Tobago	45.75	
8	2	Rob Stone	Australia	46.04	

=== Semifinals ===
==== Semifinal 1 ====
Rank	Lane	Athlete	Nation	Time	Notes
1	3	Steve Lewis	United States	44.35	Q
2	5	Danny Everett	United States	44.36	Q
3	6	Darren Clark	Australia	44.38	Q
4	8	Bertland Cameron	Jamaica	44.50	Q
5	4	Susumu Takano	Japan	44.90	
6	2	Jens Carlowitz	East Germany	45.08	
7	7	Gerson Souza	Brazil	45.27	
8	1	Tomasz Jędrusik	Poland	46.17	

==== Semifinal 2 ====
Rank	Lane	Athlete	Nation	Time	Notes
1	6	Butch Reynolds	United States	44.33	Q
2	3	Ian Morris	Trinidad and Tobago	44.60	Q
3	5	Mohamed Amer Al-Malki	Oman	44.69	Q
4	4	Innocent Egbunike	Nigeria	44.74	Q
5	2	Thomas Schönlebe	East Germany	44.90	
6	1	Howard Davis	Jamaica	45.48	
7	8	Devon Morris	Jamaica	45.68	
8	7	Brian Whittle	Great Britain	46.07	

=== Final ===
Lewis' winning margin of 0.06 seconds remained the smallest winning margin in the history of the event, until Quincy Hall won the 2024 Olympic Games by 0.04 seconds.

Rank	Lane	Athlete	Nation	Time
1st place, gold medalist(s)	6	Steve Lewis	United States	43.87
2nd place, silver medalist(s)	3	Butch Reynolds	United States	43.93
3rd place, bronze medalist(s)	4	Danny Everett	United States	44.09
4	5	Darren Clark	Australia	44.55
5	7	Innocent Egbunike	Nigeria	44.72
6	2	Bertland Cameron	Jamaica	44.94
7	8	Ian Morris	Trinidad and Tobago	44.95
8	1	Mohamed Amer Al-Malki	Oman	45.03

== See also ==
- 1987 Men's World Championships 400 metres (Rome)
- 1990 Men's European Championships 400 metres (Split)
- 1991 Men's World Championships 400 metres (Tokyo)
- 1992 Men's Olympic 400 metres (Barcelona)
