= Swimming at the 1980 Summer Olympics – Men's 200 metre butterfly =

Swimming event at the 1980 Summer Olympics

Men's 200 metre butterfly at the Games of the XXII Olympiad
- Venue: Swimming Pool at the Olimpiysky Sports Complex
- Date: 20 July
- Competitors: 25 from 19 nations
- Winning time: 1:59.76

Medalists
1st place, gold medalist(s)		Sergey Fesenko	Soviet Union
2nd place, silver medalist(s)		Philip Hubble	Great Britain
3rd place, bronze medalist(s)		Roger Pyttel	East Germany

The men's 200 metre butterfly event at the 1980 Summer Olympics was held on 20 July at the Swimming Pool at the Olimpiysky Sports Complex.

== Records ==
Prior to this competition, the existing world and Olympic records were as follows.

World record	Craig Beardsley (USA)	1:58.21	Irvine, United States	30 July 1980
Olympic record	Mike Bruner (USA)	1:59.23	Montreal, Canada	18 July 1976

== Results ==
=== Heats ===
Rank	Heat	Name	Nationality	Time	Notes
1	4	Sergey Fesenko	Soviet Union	2:00.20	Q
2	4	Philip Hubble	Great Britain	2:00.75	Q
3	2	Roger Pyttel	East Germany	2:02.07	Q
4	4	Steve Poulter	Great Britain	2:02.18	Q
5	2	Cees Vervoorn	Netherlands	2:02.21	Q
6	3	Peter Morris	Great Britain	2:02.72	Q
7	3	Pär Arvidsson	Sweden	2:03.14	Q
8	1	Mikhail Gorelik	Soviet Union	2:03.15	Q
9	1	Paolo Revelli	Italy	2:03.44	
10	3	Aleksandr Buchenkov	Soviet Union	2:03.98	
11	3	Rafael Vidal	Venezuela	2:04.23	
12	2	Bogusław Zychowicz	Poland	2:04.33	
13	2	Ove Nylén	Sweden	2:04.64	
14	4	Gábor Mészáros	Hungary	2:05.01	
15	4	Paul Moorfoot	Australia	2:05.69	
16	4	David Cummins	Ireland	2:06.47	
17	3	Evangelos Koskinas	Greece	2:06.80	
18	1	Marcus Mattioli	Brazil	2:06.87	
19	2	Andrey Aguilar	Costa Rica	2:07.57	
20	3	Cláudio Kestener	Brazil	2:08.65	
21	1	Enrique Ledesma	Ecuador	2:11.40	
22	3	Djamel Yahiouche	Algeria	2:12.65	
23	1	Trương Ngọc Tơn	Vietnam	2:23.58	
24	2	Raimundo Franisse	Mozambique	2:25.55	
25	4	Saleh Marzouk	Kuwait	2:36.53	
	1	Djan Madruga	Brazil	DNS	
	2	César Ribeiro	Angola	DNS	

=== Final ===
Rank	Name	Nationality	Time	Notes
1st place, gold medalist(s)	Sergey Fesenko	Soviet Union	1:59.76	
2nd place, silver medalist(s)	Philip Hubble	Great Britain	2:01.20	
3rd place, bronze medalist(s)	Roger Pyttel	East Germany	2:01.39	
4	Peter Morris	Great Britain	2:02.27	
5	Mikhail Gorelik	Soviet Union	2:02.44	
6	Cees Vervoorn	Netherlands	2:02.52	
7	Pär Arvidsson	Sweden	2:02.61	
8	Steve Poulter	Great Britain	2:02.93	
