= Mozambique at the 2020 Summer Olympics =

- IOC code: MOZ
- NOC: Comité Olímpico Nacional de Moçambique

in Tokyo, Japan July 23, 2021 – August 8, 2021
- Competitors: 10 in 6 sports
- Flag bearers (opening): Rady Gramane; Kevin Loforte
- Flag bearer (closing): N/A
- Medals: Gold 0 Silver 0 Bronze 0 Total 0

Summer Olympics appearances (overview)
- 1980; 1984; 1988; 1992; 1996; 2000; 2004; 2008; 2012; 2016; 2020; 2024

Mozambique competed at the 2020 Summer Olympics in Tokyo. Originally scheduled to take place from 24 July to 9 August 2020, the Games were postponed to 23 July to 8 August 2021, because of the COVID-19 pandemic. It was the nation's tenth consecutive appearance at the Summer Olympics.

== Competitors ==
The following is the list of number of competitors in the Games.

Sport	Men	Women	Total
Athletics	1	0	1
Boxing	0	2	2
Canoeing	1	0	1
Judo	1	0	1
Sailing	0	3	3
Swimming	1	1	2
Total	4	6	10

== Athletics ==
Mozambique received a universality slot from the World Athletics to send a male track and field athlete to the Olympics.

Key

- Note–Ranks given for track events are within the athlete's heat only
- Q = Qualified for the next round
- q = Qualified for the next round as a fastest loser or, in field events, by position without achieving the qualifying target
- NR = National record
- N/A = Round not applicable for the event
- Bye = Athlete not required to compete in round

Track & road events

Athlete	Event	Heat		Semifinal		Final	
Athlete	Event	Result	Rank	Result	Rank	Result	Rank
Creve Armando Machava	Men's 400 m hurdles	50.37 SB	5	Did not advance			

== Boxing ==
Mozambique entered two female boxers into the Olympic tournament for the first time in history. Alcinda Panguana (women's welterweight) and Rady Gramane (women's middleweight) secured their spots by advancing to the final match of their respective weight divisions at the 2020 African Qualification Tournament in Diamniadio, Senegal.

Athlete	Event	Round of 32	Round of 16	Quarterfinals	Semifinals	Final	
Athlete	Event	Opposition Result	Opposition Result	Opposition Result	Opposition Result	Opposition Result	Rank
Alcinda Panguana	Women's welterweight	Bye	Akinyi (KEN); W RSC	Gu H (CHN); L 0–5	Did not advance		
Rady Gramane	Women's middleweight	—N/a	Pachito (ECU); W 4–1	Magomedalieva (ROC); L 0–4	Did not advance		

== Canoeing ==
=== Sprint ===
Mozambique received an invitation from the Tripartite Commission to send a canoeist in the men's C-1 1000 m.

Athlete	Event	Heats		Quarterfinals		Semifinals		Final	
Athlete	Event	Time	Rank	Time	Rank	Time	Rank	Time	Rank
Joaquim Lobo	Men's C-1 1000 m	4:49.676	6 QF	5:04.687	7	Did not advance			

Qualification Legend: FA = Qualify to final (medal); FB = Qualify to final B (non-medal)

== Judo ==
Mozambique qualified one judoka for the men's half-lightweight category (66 kg) at the Games. Kevin Loforte received a continental berth as the nation's top-ranked judoka outside of direct qualifying position in the IJF World Ranking List of June 28, 2021.

Athlete	Event	Round of 32	Round of 16	Quarterfinals	Semifinals	Repechage	Final / BM	
Athlete	Event	Opposition Result	Opposition Result	Opposition Result	Opposition Result	Opposition Result	Opposition Result	Rank
Kevin Loforte	Men's −66 kg	Shmailov (ISR); L 00–11	Did not advance					

== Sailing ==
Mozambican sailors qualified two boats in each of the following classes through the class-associated World Championships, and the continental regattas, marking the country's debut in the sport at the Games.

Athlete	Event	Race											Net points	Final rank
Athlete	Event	1	2	3	4	5	6	7	8	9	10	M*	Net points	Final rank
Deisy Nhaquile	Women's Laser Radial	30	41	~~44~~	39	44	41	35	44	29	37	EL	340	40
Maria Machava; Denise Parruque	Women's 470	~~22~~	22	18	21	20	21	21	20	18	21	EL	182	21

M = Medal race; EL = Eliminated – did not advance into the medal race

== Swimming ==
Mozambique received a universality invitation from FINA to send two top-ranked swimmers (one per gender) in their respective individual events to the Olympics, based on the FINA Points System of June 28, 2021.

Athlete	Event	Heat		Semifinal		Final	
Athlete	Event	Time	Rank	Time	Rank	Time	Rank
Igor Mogne	Men's 400 m freestyle	3:56.56	31	—N/a		Did not advance	
Alicia Mateus	Women's 50 m freestyle	29.63	66	Did not advance			
