= Swimming at the 1980 Summer Olympics – Men's 100 metre butterfly =

Men's 100 metre butterfly at the Games of the XXII Olympiad
- Venue: Swimming Pool at the Olimpiysky Sports Complex
- Date: 22 July 1980 (heats & semifinals); 23 July 1980 (final)
- Competitors: 34 from 29 nations
- Winning time: 54.92

Medalists
1st place, gold medalist(s)		Pär Arvidsson	Sweden
2nd place, silver medalist(s)		Roger Pyttel	East Germany
3rd place, bronze medalist(s)		David López-Zubero	Spain

The men's 100 metre butterfly event at the 1980 Summer Olympics was held on 22 and 23 July at the Swimming Pool at the Olimpiysky Sports Complex.

== Records ==
Prior to this competition, the existing world and Olympic records were as follows.

World record	Pär Arvidsson (SWE)	54.15	Austin, United States	11 April 1980
Olympic record	Mark Spitz (USA)	54.27	Munich, West Germany	31 August 1972

== Results ==
=== Heats ===
Rank	Heat	Name	Nationality	Time	Notes
1	5	Pär Arvidsson	Sweden	55.18	Q
2	5	David López-Zubero	Spain	55.54	Q
3	2	Cees Vervoorn	Netherlands	55.76	Q
4	3	Yevgeny Seredin	Soviet Union	55.83	Q
5	4	Roger Pyttel	East Germany	55.99	Q
6	1	Xavier Savin	France	56.07	Q
7	3	Gary Abraham	Great Britain	56.10	Q
8	1	Guy Goosen	Zimbabwe	56.15	Q
9	1	David Lowe	Great Britain	56.22	Q
10	5	Philip Hubble	Great Britain	56.30	Q
11	3	Milošlav Roľko	Czechoslovakia	56.36	Q
12	4	Aleksey Markovsky	Soviet Union	56.45	Q
13	2	Sergey Kiselyov	Soviet Union	56.56	Q
14	5	Fabrizio Rampazzo	Italy	56.85	Q
15	4	Gábor Mészáros	Hungary	56.88	Q
16	4	Bogusław Zychowicz	Poland	57.21	Q
17	2	Yulyan Vasilev	Bulgaria	57.27	
18	1	Rafael Vidal	Venezuela	57.33	
19	2	Enrique Ledesma	Ecuador	57.35	
20	3	Cláudio Kestener	Brazil	57.65	
21	2	Kurt Dittrich	Austria	57.71	
22	3	Evangelos Koskinas	Greece	57.84	
23	4	Paulo Frischknecht	Portugal	57.94	
24	5	Marcus Mattioli	Brazil	57.96	
25	3	Andrey Aguilar	Costa Rica	58.35	
26	5	David Cummins	Ireland	58.90	
27	1	Djamel Yahiouche	Algeria	1:00.01	
28	5	Nguyễn Ðăng Bình	Vietnam	1:00.74	
29	4	Raimundo Franisse	Mozambique	1:01.83	
30	1	Ibrahim El-Baba	Lebanon	1:05.20	
31	2	Mohamed Abdul Wahab	Kuwait	1:06.35	
32	3	Linos Petridis	Cyprus	1:06.61	
33	1	Marcos Daniel	Angola	1:07.46	
34	2	Zoë Andrianifaha	Madagascar	1:14.72	
	4	Mark Tonelli	Australia	DNS	

=== Semifinals ===
Rank	Heat	Name	Nationality	Time	Notes
1	2	Cees Vervoorn	Netherlands	55.02	Q
2	2	Pär Arvidsson	Sweden	55.05	Q
3	1	David López-Zubero	Spain	55.47	Q
4	2	Gary Abraham	Great Britain	55.53	Q
5	1	Yevgeny Seredin	Soviet Union	55.62	Q
6	2	Roger Pyttel	East Germany	55.63	Q
7	1	Xavier Savin	France	55.67	Q
8	1	Aleksey Markovsky	Soviet Union	55.69	Q
9	2	David Lowe	Great Britain	55.81	
10	2	Milošlav Roľko	Czechoslovakia	56.16	
11	1	Guy Goosen	Zimbabwe	56.35	
12	1	Philip Hubble	Great Britain	56.51	
13	2	Sergey Kiselyov	Soviet Union	56.52	
14	1	Fabrizio Rampazzo	Italy	56.76	
15	2	Gábor Mészáros	Hungary	56.89	
16	1	Bogusław Zychowicz	Poland	57.43	

=== Final ===
Rank	Name	Nationality	Time	Notes
1st place, gold medalist(s)	Pär Arvidsson	Sweden	54.92	
2nd place, silver medalist(s)	Roger Pyttel	East Germany	54.94	
3rd place, bronze medalist(s)	David López-Zubero	Spain	55.13	
4	Cees Vervoorn	Netherlands	55.25	
5	Yevgeni Seredin	Soviet Union	55.35	
6	Gary Abraham	Great Britain	55.42	
7	Xavier Savin	France	55.66	
8	Aleksei Markovski	Soviet Union	55.70	
