= Mozambique at the 1992 Summer Olympics =

- IOC code: MOZ
- NOC: Comité Olímpico Nacional de Moçambique

in Barcelona
- Competitors: 6 (3 men and 3 women) in 2 sports
- Flag bearer: Jaime Rodrigues
- Medals: Gold 0 Silver 0 Bronze 0 Total 0

Summer Olympics appearances (overview)
- 1980; 1984; 1988; 1992; 1996; 2000; 2004; 2008; 2012; 2016; 2020; 2024

Mozambique competed at the 1992 Summer Olympics in Barcelona, Spain.

== Competitors ==
The following is the list of number of competitors in the Games.

Sport	Men	Women	Total
Athletics	1	2	3
Swimming	2	1	3
Total	3	3	6

== Athletics ==
Men
Track & road events

Athlete	Event	Heat		Quarterfinal		Semifinal		Final	
Athlete	Event	Result	Rank	Result	Rank	Result	Rank	Result	Rank
Jaime Rodrigues	400 m	48.89	7	Did not advance					

Women
Track & road events

Athlete	Event	Heat		Quarterfinal		Semifinal		Final	
Athlete	Event	Result	Rank	Result	Rank	Result	Rank	Result	Rank
Maria de Lurdes Mutola	800 m	2:00.83	2 Q	—		1:58.16	2 Q	1:57.49	5
Maria de Lurdes Mutola	1500 m	4:07.59	3 Q	—		4:04.20	3 Q	4:02.60	9
Tina Paulino	400 m	52.93	5 q	52.34	7	Did not advance			

== Swimming ==
Men

Athlete	Event	Heat		Final B		Final A	
Athlete	Event	Time	Rank	Time	Rank	Time	Rank
Sergio Faftine	100 metre breaststroke	1:13.76	55	Did not advance			
José Mossiane	50 metre freestyle	DQ		Did not advance			

Women

Athlete	Event	Heat		Final B		Final A	
Athlete	Event	Time	Rank	Time	Rank	Time	Rank
Mariza Gregorio	100 metre butterfly	1:10.27	49	Did not advance			

== Sources ==
- Official Olympic Reports
