= Mozambique at the 1988 Summer Olympics =

- IOC code: MOZ
- NOC: Comité Olímpico Nacional de Moçambique

in Seoul
- Competitors: 8 (6 men and 2 women) in 3 sports
- Flag bearer: Sergio Fafitine
- Medals: Gold 0 Silver 0 Bronze 0 Total 0

Summer Olympics appearances (overview)
- 1980; 1984; 1988; 1992; 1996; 2000; 2004; 2008; 2012; 2016; 2020; 2024; 2028

Mozambique competed at the 1988 Summer Olympics in Seoul, South Korea.

== Competitors ==
The following is the list of number of competitors in the Games.

Sport	Men	Women	Total
Athletics	2	1	3
Boxing	3	–	3
Swimming	1	1	2
Total	6	2	8

== Athletics ==
Men
Track & road events

Athlete	Event	Heat		Quarterfinal		Semifinal		Final	
Athlete	Event	Result	Rank	Result	Rank	Result	Rank	Result	Rank
Jaime Rodrigues	400 m	47.33	6	Did not advance					

Field events

Athlete	Event	Qualification		Final	
Athlete	Event	Distance	Position	Distance	Position
Paulo Noronha	Triple jump	14.71	39	Did not advance	

Women
Track & road events

Athlete	Event	Heat		Quarterfinal		Semifinal		Final	
Athlete	Event	Result	Rank	Result	Rank	Result	Rank	Result	Rank
Maria Mutola	800 m	2:04.36	7	Did not advance					

== Boxing ==
Men

Athlete	Event	1 Round	2 Round	3 Round	Quarterfinals	Semifinals	Final
Athlete	Event	Opposition Result	Opposition Result	Opposition Result	Opposition Result	Opposition Result	Rank
Archer Fausto	Flyweight	Joseph Lawlor (IRL); L KO-2	Did not advance				
Alberto Machaze	Bantamweight	BYE	Mike Deveney (GBR); W 5-0	Stephen Mwema (KEN); L 0-5	Did not advance		9
Lucas Januario	Welterweight	BYE	Javier Martínez (ESP); L 0-5	Did not advance			

== Swimming ==
Men

Athlete	Event	Heat		Final B		Final A	
Athlete	Event	Time	Rank	Time	Rank	Time	Rank
Sergio Faftine	50 metre freestyle	25.97	59	Did not advance			
Sergio Faftine	100 metre freestyle	57.10	67	Did not advance			
Sergio Faftine	100 metre butterfly	1:01.15	46	Did not advance			

Women

Athlete	Event	Heat		Final B		Final A	
Athlete	Event	Time	Rank	Time	Rank	Time	Rank
Carolina Araujo	50 metre freestyle	29.64	48	Did not advance			
Carolina Araujo	100 metre freestyle	1:05.11	53	Did not advance			
Carolina Araujo	100 metre backstroke	1:15.86	40	Did not advance			
