= Mozambique at the 2016 Summer Olympics =

- IOC code: MOZ
- NOC: Comité Olímpico Nacional de Moçambique

in Rio de Janeiro
- Competitors: 6 in 4 sports
- Flag bearer: Joaquim Lobo
- Medals: Gold 0 Silver 0 Bronze 0 Total 0

Summer Olympics appearances (overview)
- 1980; 1984; 1988; 1992; 1996; 2000; 2004; 2008; 2012; 2016; 2020; 2024

Mozambique competed at the 2016 Summer Olympics in Rio de Janeiro, Brazil, from 5 to 21 August 2016. This was the nation's tenth consecutive appearance at the Summer Olympics.

The Mozambique National Olympic Committee (Portuguese: Comité Olímpico Nacional de Moçambique) sent a team of six athletes, five men and one woman, to compete in four different sports at the Games. Among the sports represented by the athletes, Mozambique marked its Olympic debut in flatwater canoeing.

The majority of the Mozambican roster made their Olympic debut in Rio de Janeiro, except for hurdler Kurt Couto, who attended his fourth straight Games as the most experienced competitor. Other notable athletes included Dutch-born butterfly swimmer and 2014 Youth Olympian Jannah Sonnenschein, the lone female of the team, and the canoeing tandem of Mussa Chamaune and Joaquim Lobo, who acted as the nation's flag bearer in the opening ceremony.

Mozambique, however, failed to win a single Olympic medal since the 2000 Summer Olympics in Sydney, where middle-distance runner Maria Mutola became the nation's first ever champion in the women's 800 metres.

== Athletics (track and field) ==
Mozambican athletes have so far achieved qualifying standards in the following athletics events (up to a maximum of 3 athletes in each event):

Key

- Note–Ranks given for track events are within the athlete's heat only
- Q = Qualified for the next round
- q = Qualified for the next round as a fastest loser or, in field events, by position without achieving the qualifying target
- NR = National record
- N/A = Round not applicable for the event
- Bye = Athlete not required to compete in round

Track & road events

Athlete	Event	Heat		Semifinal		Final	
Athlete	Event	Result	Rank	Result	Rank	Result	Rank
Kurt Couto	Men's 400 m hurdles	49.74 SB	6	did not advance			

== Canoeing ==
=== Sprint ===
Mozambique qualified one boat for the men's C-2 1000 m into the Olympic canoeing regatta through the 2016 African Sprint Qualifying Tournament, signifying the nation's Olympic debut in the sport.

Athlete	Event	Heats		Semifinals		Final	
Athlete	Event	Time	Rank	Time	Rank	Time	Rank
Mussa Chamaune	Men's C-1 1000 m	5:00.454	7 Q	5:07.281	8	did not advance	
Joaquim Lobo	Men's C-1 200 m	44.949	6	did not advance			
Mussa Chamaune; Joaquim Lobo	Men's C-2 1000 m	4:14.002	5 Q	4:23.965	4 FB	4:38.732	11

Qualification Legend: FA = Qualify to final (medal); FB = Qualify to final B (non-medal)

== Judo ==
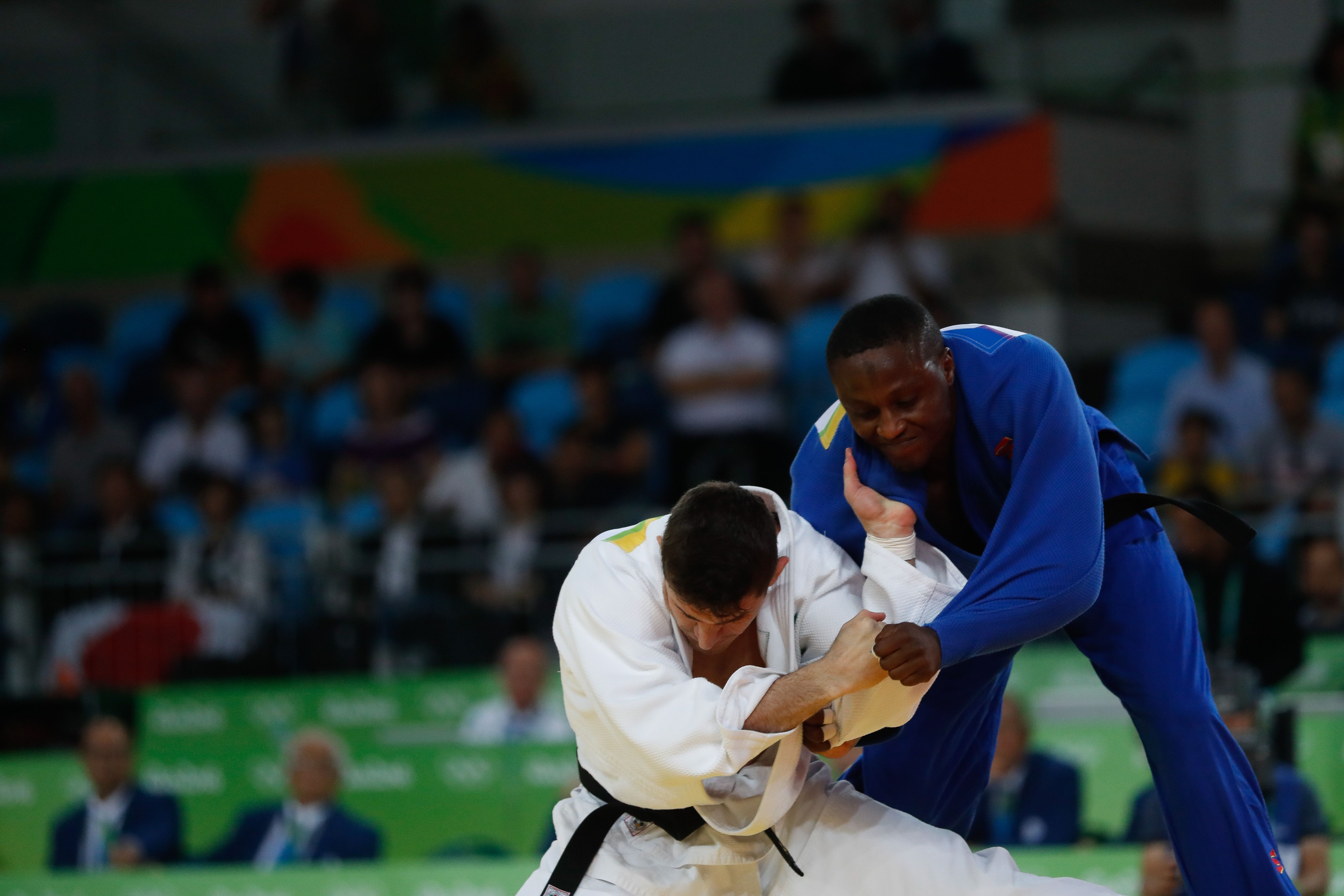
Marlon Acácio (right) vs Victor Penalber

Mozambique qualified one judoka for the men's half-middleweight category (81 kg) at the Games. Marlon Acácio earned a continental quota spot from the African region as Mozambique's top-ranked judoka outside of direct qualifying position in the IJF World Ranking List of May 30, 2016.

Athlete	Event	Round of 64	Round of 32	Round of 16	Quarterfinals	Semifinals	Repechage	Final / BM	
Athlete	Event	Opposition Result	Opposition Result	Opposition Result	Opposition Result	Opposition Result	Opposition Result	Opposition Result	Rank
Marlon Acácio	Men's −81 kg	Bye	Penalber (BRA); L 000–100	did not advance					

== Swimming ==
Mozambique received a Universality invitation from FINA to send two swimmers (one male and one female) to the Olympics.

Athlete	Event	Heat		Semifinal		Final	
Athlete	Event	Time	Rank	Time	Rank	Time	Rank
Igor Mogne	Men's 100 m freestyle	50.65	45	did not advance			
Jannah Sonnenschein	Women's 100 m butterfly	1:04.21	39	did not advance			
