= Mozambique at the 2024 Summer Olympics =

- IOC code: MOZ
- NOC: Comité Olímpico Nacional de Moçambique

in Paris, France 26 July 2024 – 11 August 2021
- Competitors: 7 (3 men and 4 women) in 5 sports
- Flag bearers: Matthew Lawrence & Alcinda Panguana
- Medals: Gold 0 Silver 0 Bronze 0 Total 0

Summer Olympics appearances (overview)
- 1980; 1984; 1988; 1992; 1996; 2000; 2004; 2008; 2012; 2016; 2020; 2024

Mozambique competed at the 2024 Summer Olympics in Paris from 26 July to 11 August 2024. It was the nation's eleventh consecutive appearance at the Summer Olympics since the nation's official debut at the 1980 Summer Olympics.

== Competitors ==
The following is the list of number of competitors in the Games.

Sport	Men	Women	Total
Athletics	1	0	1
Boxing	1	1	2
Judo	0	1	1
Sailing	0	1	1
Swimming	1	1	2
Total	3	4	7

== Athletics ==
Mozambique sent one sprinter to compete at the 2024 Summer Olympics.

Key

- Note–Ranks given for track events are within the athlete's heat only
- Q = Qualified for the next round
- q = Qualified for the next round as a fastest loser or, in field events, by position without achieving the qualifying target
- NR = National record
- N/A = Round not applicable for the event
- Bye = Athlete not required to compete in round

Track events

Athlete	Event	Heat		Repechage		Semifinal		Final	
Athlete	Event	Result	Rank	Result	Rank	Result	Rank	Result	Rank
Steven Sabino	Men's 100 m	DSQ	—	—N/a		Did not advance			

== Boxing ==
Mozambique entered three boxers into the Olympic tournament. Alcinda Panguana secured one of two available spots in women's welterweight division by advancing to the final match at the 2023 African Olympic Qualification Tournament in Dakar, Senegal; meanwhile Tiago Muxanga qualified for the games through the universality invitations.

Athlete	Event	Round of 32	Round of 16	Quarterfinals	Semifinals	Final	
Athlete	Event	Opposition Result	Opposition Result	Opposition Result	Opposition Result	Opposition Result	Rank
Tiago Muxanga	Men's 71 kg	Schachidow (GER); W 4–1	Verde (MEX); L 2–3	Did not advance			
Alcinda Panguana	Women's 66 kg	Triebeľová (SVK); W 5–0	Yang L (CHN); L 0–5	Did not advance			

== Judo ==
Mozanbique qualified one judoka for the following weight class at the Games. Jacira Ferreira (women's half-lightweight, 52 kg) qualified via continental quota based on Olympic point rankings.

Athlete	Event	Round of 32	Round of 16	Quarterfinals	Semifinals	Repechage	Final / BM	
Athlete	Event	Opposition Result	Opposition Result	Opposition Result	Opposition Result	Opposition Result	Opposition Result	Rank
Jacira Ferreira	Women's −52 kg	Maharani (INA); L 00–10	Did not advance					

== Sailing ==
Mozambican sailors qualified one boat in the following classes through the 2023 African Regatta in Soma Bay, Egypt.

Medal race events

Athlete	Event	Race																Net points	Final rank
Athlete	Event	1	2	3	4	5	6	7	8	9	10	11	12	13	14	15	M*	Net points	Final rank
Deizy Nhaquile	Women's ILCA 6	39	32	34	~~42~~	42	42	36	41	35	Cancelled	—N/a					EL	301	40

M = Medal race; EL = Eliminated – did not advance into the medal race

== Swimming ==
Mozambique sent two swimmers to compete at the 2024 Paris Olympics.

Athlete	Event	Heat		Semifinal		Final	
Athlete	Event	Time	Rank	Time	Rank	Time	Rank
Matthew Lawrence	Men's 100 m breaststroke	1:04.95	32	Did not advance			
Denise Donelli	Women's 100 m backstroke	1:08.73	34	Did not advance			
