= Mozambique at the 2000 Summer Olympics =

- IOC code: MOZ
- NOC: Comité Olímpico Nacional de Moçambique

in Sydney
- Competitors: 4 (2 men and 2 women) in 2 sports
- Flag bearer: Jorge Duvane
- Medals Ranked 50th: Gold 1 Silver 0 Bronze 0 Total 1

Summer Olympics appearances (overview)
- 1980; 1984; 1988; 1992; 1996; 2000; 2004; 2008; 2012; 2016; 2020; 2024

Mozambique competed at the 2000 Summer Olympics in Sydney, Australia. Mozambique won their first Olympic gold medal at these games in the women's 800m, their only medal at the games.

== Medalists ==
Medal	Name	Sport	Event	Date
Gold	Maria de Lurdes Mutola	Athletics	Women's 800 metres	25 September

== Competitors ==
The following is the list of number of competitors in the Games.

Sport	Men	Women	Total
Athletics	1	1	2
Swimming	1	1	2
Total	2	2	4

== Athletics ==
Men

Athlete	Event	Heat		Semifinal		Final	
Athlete	Event	Result	Rank	Result	Rank	Result	Rank
Jorge Duvane	800 m	1:52.97	8	Did not advance			

Women

Athlete	Event	Heat		Semifinal		Final	
Athlete	Event	Result	Rank	Result	Rank	Result	Rank
Maria de Lurdes Mutola	800 m	1:59.88	1 Q	1:58.56	1 Q	1:56.15	
Tina Paulino	800 m	DNS		Did not advance			

== Swimming ==
Men

Athlete	Event	Heat		Semifinal		Final	
Athlete	Event	Time	Rank	Time	Rank	Time	Rank
Ilidio Matusse	50 m freestyle	26.28	65	Did not advance			

Women

Athlete	Event	Heat		Semifinal		Final	
Athlete	Event	Time	Rank	Time	Rank	Time	Rank
Tanya Anacleto	50 m freestyle	28.78	57	Did not advance			
