= Zychowicz =

Zychowicz is a Polish surname. Notable people with the surname include:

- Bogusław Zychowicz (born 1961), Polish swimmer
- Piotr Zychowicz (born 1980), Polish journalist and writer
- Zbigniew Zychowicz (1953–2016), Polish politician
