= Gaily =

Gaily may refer to:

- Gaily (horse), a racehorse
- Gaily Dube (born 1969), Zimbabwean sprinter
- 14092 Gaily, a minor planet
