= Ludovina de Oliveira =

Mozambican discus thrower

Personal information
- Nationality: Mozambican
- Born: 26 April 1955 (age 71)

Sport
- Sport: Athletics
- Event: Discus throw

Ludovina Dias de Oliveira (born 26 April 1955) is a Mozambican former athlete. She competed in the women's discus throw at the 1980 Summer Olympics.

de Oliveira attended College of the Marists in Porto, Portugal. She competed in athletics at the 1978 All-Africa Games before the 1980 Olympics. She was an African Zone VI Athletics Championships winner in the discus.

She retired from competition in 1996. After that, she worked for the Mozambican Athletics Federation. She lives in Portugal.
