= Mozambique at the 1996 Summer Olympics =

- IOC code: MOZ
- NOC: Comité Olímpico Nacional de Moçambique

in Atlanta
- Competitors: 3 (2 men and 1 woman) in 3 sports
- Flag bearer: Maria Mutola
- Medals Ranked 71st: Gold 0 Silver 0 Bronze 1 Total 1

Summer Olympics appearances (overview)
- 1980; 1984; 1988; 1992; 1996; 2000; 2004; 2008; 2012; 2016; 2020; 2024

Mozambique competed at the 1996 Summer Olympics in Atlanta, United States. The nation won its first ever Olympic medal at these Games.

== Medalists ==
Medal	Name	Sport	Event	Date
Bronze	Maria Mutola	Athletics	Women's 800 metres	29 July

== Competitors ==
The following is the list of number of competitors in the Games.

Sport	Men	Women	Total
Athletics	0	1	1
Boxing	1	–	1
Swimming	1	0	1
Total	2	1	3

== Athletics ==
Women
Track and road events

Athlete	Event	Heat		Quarterfinal		Semifinal		Final	
Athlete	Event	Result	Rank	Result	Rank	Result	Rank	Result	Rank
Maria Mutola	800 metres	1:58.98	2 Q	—		1:57.62	1 Q	1:58.71	Bronze medal

== Boxing ==
Men

Athlete	Event	Round of 32	Round of 16	Quarterfinals	Semifinals	Final	
Athlete	Event	Opposition Result	Opposition Result	Opposition Result	Opposition Result	Opposition Result	Rank
Lucas Sinoia	Welterweight	Mezga (BLR); L 11-6	Did not advance				

== Swimming ==
Men

Athlete	Event	Heat		Final B		Final	
Athlete	Event	Time	Rank	Time	Rank	Time	Rank
Leandro Jorge	100 m backstroke	1:03.86	48	Did not advance			
