= Ernesto Nocco =

Italian sprinter

Personal information
- National team: Italy
- Born: 27 November 1957 (age 68) Las Plassas, Italy
- Height: 1.96 m (6 ft 5 in)
- Weight: 87 kg (192 lb)

Sport
- Sport: Athletics
- Event: Sprint

Achievements and titles
- Personal bests: 400 m: 47.06 (1984); 500 m: 1.01.38 (1984)

Ernesto Nocco (born 27 November 1957) is a retired Italian sprinter who specialized in the 400 metres.

== Biography ==
At the 1984 Olympic Games he finished fifth in the 4 x 400 metres relay, together with teammates Roberto Tozzi, Roberto Ribaud and Pietro Mennea.

Nocco was not a good starter from the starting blocks but more effective in a standing outset, therefore he was suitable for relays. In 400m, he has a personal best time of 47.06 seconds, achieved in July 1984 in Rome.

== Achievements ==
Year	Competition	Venue	Position	Event	Performance	Notes
1984	Olympic Games	(United States) Los Angeles	5th	4 × 400 m relay	3:01.44	

== See also ==
- Italy national relay team
