= Elkana Nyangau =

Kenyan sprinter

Personal information
- Nationality: Kenyan
- Born: 1963 (age 62–63)

Sport
- Sport: Sprinting
- Event: 400 metres
Medal record
Men's athletics
Representing Kenya
African Championships
Bronze medal – third place	1984 Rabat	4×400 m

Elkana Nyangau (born 1963) is a Kenyan sprinter. He competed in the men's 400 metres at the 1988 Summer Olympics.
