= Mozambique at the 2012 Summer Olympics =

- IOC code: MOZ
- NOC: National Olympic Committee of Mozambique

in London
- Competitors: 6 in 4 sports
- Flag bearer: Kurt Couto
- Medals: Gold 0 Silver 0 Bronze 0 Total 0

Summer Olympics appearances (overview)
- 1980; 1984; 1988; 1992; 1996; 2000; 2004; 2008; 2012; 2016; 2020; 2024

Mozambique competed at the 2012 Summer Olympics in London, from 27 July to 12 August 2012. This was the nation's ninth consecutive appearance at the Olympics. In the weeks before the Games, Mozambique athletes trained at Comberton Village College in Cambridge.

The National Olympic Committee of Mozambique sent the nation's largest delegation to the Games since the 1992 Summer Olympics in Barcelona, Spain. A total of six athletes, four men and two women, competed in athletics, boxing, judo and swimming. Mozambique again failed to win a single Olympic medal. They have not won an Olympic medal since the 2000 Summer Olympics in Sydney, New South Wales, Australia.

== Background ==
Mozambique made their Olympic debut at the 1980 Summer Olympics in Moscow, Russian Soviet Federative Socialist Republic, Soviet Union and they had appeared at every Summer Olympics since. The 2012 Summer Olympics in London, England, United Kingdom marked Mozambique's ninth appearance at the Summer Olympics and the six athletes present was their largest delegation since the 1992 Summer Olympics in Barcelona, Spain. Prior to 2012, Mozambique had not won an Olympic medal since the 2000 Summer Olympics in Sydney, New South Wales, Australia.

== Competitors ==
In total, six athletes represented Mozambique at the 2012 Summer Olympics in London, England, United Kingdom across four different sports.

Sport	Men	Women	Total
Athletics	1	1	2
Boxing	1	0	1
Judo	1	0	1
Swimming	1	1	2
Total	4	2	6

== Athletics ==
In total, two Mozambican athletes participated in the athletics events – Kurt Couto in the men's 400 m hurdles and Silvia Panguana in the women's 100 m hurdles.

Men

Athlete	Event	Heat		Semifinal		Final	
Athlete	Event	Result	Rank	Result	Rank	Result	Rank
Kurt Couto	400 m hurdles	49.31	3 Q	51.55	8	did not advance	

Women

Athlete	Event	Heat		Semifinal		Final	
Athlete	Event	Result	Rank	Result	Rank	Result	Rank
Silvia Panguana	100 m hurdles	14.68	8	did not advance			

== Boxing ==
In total, one Mozambican athlete participated in the boxing events – Juliano Gento Maquina in the men's light flyweight category.

Athlete	Event	Round of 32	Round of 16	Quarterfinals	Semifinals	Final	
Athlete	Event	Opposition Result	Opposition Result	Opposition Result	Opposition Result	Opposition Result	Rank
Juliano Gento Maquina	Light flyweight	Aleksandrov (BUL); L 7–22	did not advance				

== Judo ==
In total, one Mozambican athletes participated in the judo events – Neuso Sigauque in the men's −60 kg category.

Athlete	Event	Round of 64	Round of 32	Round of 16	Quarterfinals	Semifinals	Repechage	Final / BM	
Athlete	Event	Opposition Result	Opposition Result	Opposition Result	Opposition Result	Opposition Result	Opposition Result	Opposition Result	Rank
Neuso Sigauque	Men's −60 kg	Bye	Lomo (SOL); L 0010–0100	did not advance					

== Swimming ==
In total, two Mozambican athletes participated in the swimming events – Chakyl Camal in the men's 50 m freestyle and Jessica Teixeira Vieira in the women's 50 m freestyle.

Men

Athlete	Event	Heat		Semifinal		Final	
Athlete	Event	Time	Rank	Time	Rank	Time	Rank
Chakyl Camal	50 m freestyle	24.43	38	did not advance			

Women

Athlete	Event	Heat		Semifinal		Final	
Athlete	Event	Time	Rank	Time	Rank	Time	Rank
Jessica Teixeira Vieira	50 m freestyle	27.39	44	did not advance			
