= Derek Archer =

Trinidad and Tobago sprinter

Personal information
- Nationality: Trinidad and Tobago
- Born: 25 October 1960 (age 65)

Sport
- Sport: Sprinting
- Event: 4 × 400 metres relay

Derek Archer (born 25 October 1960) is a Trinidad and Tobago sprinter. He competed in the men's 4 × 400 metres relay at the 1984 Summer Olympics.
