= Rady Gramane =

Mozambican boxer (born 1995)

Personal information
- Born: 11 November 1995 (age 30)

Sport
- Country: Mozambique
- Sport: Boxing
Medal record
Women's amateur boxing
Representing Mozambique
World Championships
Bronze medal – third place	2022 Istanbul	Middleweight
African Games
Silver medal – second place	2019 Rabat	Middleweight
Bronze medal – third place	2015 Brazzaville	Middleweight
Bronze medal – third place	2023 Accra	Middleweight

Rady Adosinda Gramane (born 11 November 1995) is a Mozambican boxer. She represented Mozambique at the 2018 Commonwealth Games held in Gold Coast, Australia. In the same year, she also competed in the women's middleweight event at the 2018 AIBA Women's World Boxing Championships held in New Delhi, India.

Gramane was discovered by Mozambican former Olympic boxer Lucas Sinoia, who invited her to try the sport and became her coach.

In 2019, she won the silver medal in the women's middleweight event at the African Games held in Rabat, Morocco.

In 2020, she qualified at the African Olympic Qualification Tournament held in Diamniadio, Senegal, to compete at the 2020 Summer Olympics in Tokyo, Japan, where she competed in the middleweight category. She was eliminated in her second match by Zemfira Magomedalieva.

Olympic Games
Preceded by Joaquim Lobo	Flag bearer for Mozambique; Tokyo 2020 with Kevin Loforte	Succeeded by Alcinda Lucas Dos Santos; Matthew Lawrence
