= Rotimi Peters =

Nigerian sprinter

Medal record

Men's athletics

Representing Nigeria

Olympic Games
Bronze medal – third place	1984 Los Angeles	4x400 m

African Championships
Silver medal – second place	1984 Rabat	4×400 m

Rotimi Peters (born 18 December 1955 or 1954) is a retired Nigerian athlete who competed in the 400 & 4×400 meters.

He competed for Nigeria in the 1984 Summer Olympics held in Los Angeles, United States in the 4 x 400 meters relay where he won the bronze medal with his teammates Sunday Uti, Moses Ugbusien and Innocent Egbunike.

Peters sprinted for the Indiana Hoosiers track and field team, anchoring their 7th-place 4 × 400 m relay at the 1978 NCAA Division I Outdoor Track and Field Championships.
