= Sportraad Amsterdam =

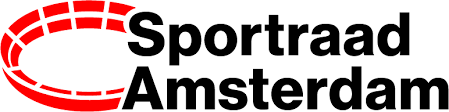
- Formation: 1952
- Headquarters: Amsterdam
- Leader: Ageeth Telleman
- Website: www.sportraadamsterdam.nl

The Sports Council Amsterdam (Dutch: Sportraad Amsterdam) is an independent advisory body created by the city council in 1952. Its 1952 report "De Amsterdamse Sportbevolking" is reportedly the first sociological research report on sports in the Netherlands. Its reports are influential and its medal of honour is prestigious.

== Sport Council Members ==
The Council has up to 18 members, elected by the municipal council of Amsterdam. Notable (former) members of the Council include:

- Frits Barend
- Marloes Coenen
- Uri Coronel
- Jessica Gal
- Kirsten van der Kolk
- Humberto Tan
- Cees Vervoorn

== Activities ==
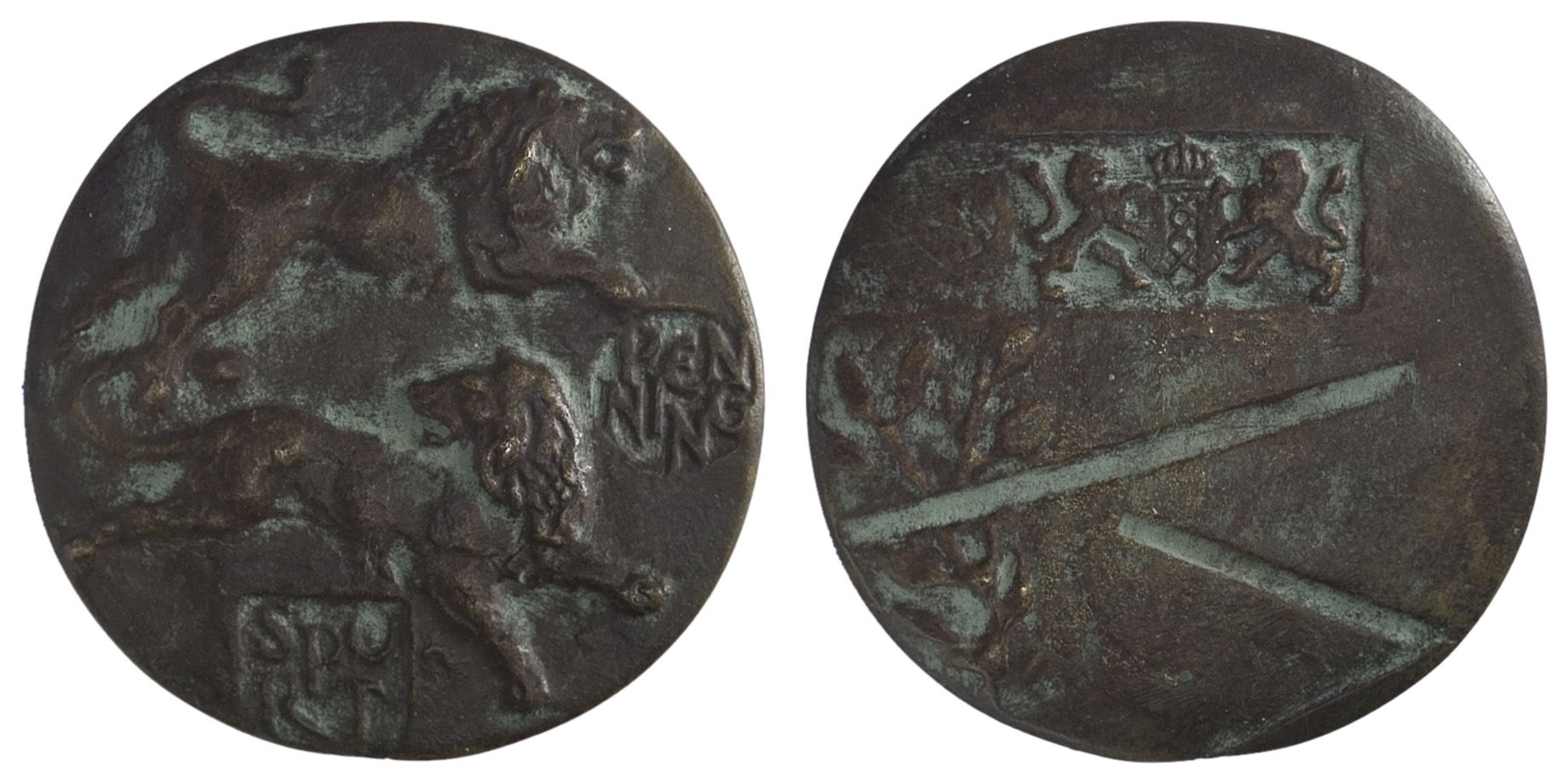
Sportpenning Amsterdam 1964 designed by Eric Claus

=== Reports ===
The Council, supported by its Bureau, prepares reports on a wide array of issues related to sports in Amsterdam. Among the topics addressed in these reports are:

- Child exploitation in commercial soccer schools
- Physical education in primary schools

=== Medal of Honour ===
Each year Sportraad honours a person or organization for its outstanding contribution to sports in Amsterdam by awarding a medal called Sportpenning. Among the laureates are:

- 2010: Carolien Gehrels
- 2015: The Flevopark swimming pool Association
