= Maher Abbas =

Lebanese middle-distance runner (born 1966)

Personal information
- Born: 22 April 1966 (age 60) Beirut, Lebanon
- Education: Mankato State University; Emory University; Stanford University
- Height: 178 cm (5 ft 10 in)
- Weight: 78 kg (172 lb)

Sport
- Country: Lebanon
- Sport: Athletics
- Events: 400 metres, 800 metres

Maher Aref Abbas (Arabic: ماهر عارف عباس; born 22 April 1966) is a Lebanese-American colorectal surgeon and former athlete. From Beirut, he was a standout athlete growing up in Lebanon, setting several under-18 national records. He moved to the U.S. in the mid-1980s where he attended Emory University and competed in track, serving as team captain. He represented Lebanon at the 1988 Summer Olympics in the men's 400m and 800m. After his sports career, he graduated from Stanford University with a medical degree and became a colorectal surgeon. He has authored over 150 scientific articles, served on the editorial boards for several journals, and performed over 20,000 operations.

== Life and career ==
Maher Aref Abbas was born on 22 April 1966 and grew up in Beirut, Lebanon. He grew up playing basketball before switching to track and field. He later said regarding his switch, "I was a valuable player because of my stamina. I could always keep running. But I got frustrated because referees were easy to bribe. If you weren't playing at your own high school, the calls were going to go against you. I wanted to do something on my own. Track was the best thing." Abbas became one of Lebanon's top athletes, setting the national U18 records in the 800, 1500 and 3000 metres. He was considered a top prospect to represent Lebanon at the 1984 Summer Olympics in the 400m and 800m, though was unable to participate after suffering severe injuries in a motorcycle accident including broken bones in his back and legs and torn ligaments in his leg. Later, he was accepted to the American University of Beirut, but chose to immigrate to the United States in 1985 to escape the Lebanese Civil War and the fanaticism of the university's students.

In the U.S., Abbas attended Mankato State University in Minnesota from 1985 to 1986 before transferring to Emory University in Georgia. At Emory, he studied biology and chemistry and competed for the school's track team. He worked at the school's Yerkes National Primate Research Center, assisting in behavioral studies for monkeys. In 1987, he was named all-region after helping Emory to a regional National Collegiate Athletic Association (NCAA) championship in cross country running; he went on to compete at the NCAA Division III men's cross country championships where he finished 149th. He set school records in the 4 × 400 metres relay, distance medley relay, 4 × 800 metres relay, and the indoor mile run. Abbas was named the co-team captain and the school's most improved runner. Having no personal coach, he designed his own training program at Emory that included two to three hours of training per day and swimming three days a week.

Early in 1988, Emory's athletics department contacted the Lebanese Track and Field Federation regarding Abbas's track accomplishments. The federation verified his times and later selected him to compete at the 1988 Summer Olympics for Lebanon. He became the first Olympian from Emory and was also the only person on the 12-member Lebanon Olympic team to be based outside of the country. At the Olympics, he competed in the men's 400m and 800m. In the 400m, he finished seventh in his heat with a time of 51.29 and failed to advance. In the 800m, he also placed seventh in his heat and failed to advance, recording a time of 1:53.76. In his career, Abbas's best time in the 400m was 51.29 seconds and his best in the 800m was 1:53.76. He stood at 178 centimetres (5 ft 10 in) and weighed 78 kilograms (172 lb) during his career.

After graduating from Emory University, Abbas studied at Stanford University, receiving a medical degree, and then finished surgical training at Mayo Clinic. After this, he completed a colorectal surgery fellowship at Cleveland Clinic in Florida. He worked at Kaiser Permanente in Los Angeles, California, serving as founding chair of robotic and minimally invasive surgery as well as regional chief of colon and rectal surgery for the Southern California Permanente Medical Group. In 2013, he became the founding chair of the digestive disease institute at the Cleveland Clinic location in Abu Dhabi, United Arab Emirates. He then moved to Dubai in 2017 where he specializes in colon and rectal surgery. Abbas has served as an associate professor of surgery at the University of California, Los Angeles and at the University of California, Irvine. He was also a full professor of surgery for the Cleveland Clinic Lerner College of Medicine.

In his career as a surgeon, Abbas has performed over 20,000 operations and written over 150 scientific articles and books. He has been on the editorial boards for several journals and has served as an associate editor of the journal Diseases of the Colon & Rectum, the official publication of the American Society of Colon and Rectal Surgeons, for over a decade. Abbas serves on the oral and written examination committees for the American Board of Colon and Rectal Surgery, where he is a senior examiner. He has received several awards, including selection to America's Top Surgeons and the Los Angeles magazine list of Top Doctors.
