= Clyde Edwards =

Barbadian sprinter

Medal record

Men's athletics

Representing Barbados

CAC Junior Championships (U20)
Gold medal – first place	1976 Xalapa	400 m

CARIFTA Games Junior (U20)
Gold medal – first place	1977 Bridgetown	400m

Clyde Edwards is a retired Barbadian sprinter who specialized in the 400 metres.

He became Central American and Caribbean junior champion in 1976.

At the 1984 Olympic Games he finished sixth in the 4 x 400 metres relay, together with teammates Richard Louis, David Peltier and Elvis Forde. Their time of 3:01.60 minutes is still the Barbadian record. Edwards also competed in the 4 x 100 metres relay at the 1984 Olympics.

== Achievements ==
Year	Competition	Venue	Position	Event	Notes
Representing Barbados
1976	Central American and Caribbean; Junior Championships (U20)	Xalapa, Mexico	1st	400 m	48.28
1977	CARIFTA Games (U20)	Bridgetown, Barbados	1st	400 m	47.68
1978	Central American and Caribbean Games	Medellín, Colombia	5th	200 m	21.23
1978	Central American and Caribbean Games	Medellín, Colombia	4th	400 m	46.14
1978	Commonwealth Games	Edmonton, Canada	27th (h)	200 m	21.85
1978	Commonwealth Games	Edmonton, Canada	11th (sf)	400 m	47.62
1979	Pan American Games	San Juan, Puerto Rico	7th	400 m	46.66
1979	World Cup	Montreal, Canada	5th	4 × 400 m relay	3:02.39^{1}
1984	Olympic Games	Los Angeles, United States	11th (sf)	4 × 100 m relay	40.18
1984	Olympic Games	Los Angeles, United States	6th	4 × 400 m relay	3:01.60

^{1}Representing the Americas
