= David Peltier =

Barbadian sprinter

David Peltier (born 26 September 1963) is a retired Barbadian sprinter who specialized in the 400 metres.

Peltier competed for the UT Arlington Mavericks track and field team in the NCAA.

At the 1984 Olympic Games he finished sixth in the 4 x 400 metres relay, together with teammates Richard Louis, Clyde Edwards and Elvis Forde. Their time of 3:01.60 minutes is still the Barbadian record. Peltier also competed in the individual distance at the 1984 Olympics.
