= Aleksandr Buchenkov =

Soviet swimmer

Personal information
- Born: 21 December 1963 (age 62)

Sport
- Sport: Swimming

Aleksandr Buchenkov (born 21 December 1963) is a Soviet swimmer. He competed in the men's 200 metre butterfly at the 1980 Summer Olympics.
