= Lin Kuang-liang =

Taiwanese sprinter

Personal information
- Nationality: Taiwanese
- Born: 林 光亮, Pinyin: Lín Guāng-liàng; 15 September 1969 (age 56)

Sport
- Sport: Sprinting
- Event: 400 metres
Medal record
Representing Chinese Taipei
Asian Championships
Bronze medal – third place	1987 Singapore	4x400m relay

Lin Kuang-liang (born 15 September 1969) is a Taiwanese sprinter. He competed in the men's 400 metres at the 1988 Summer Olympics.
