= Yaya Seyba =

Malian sprinter (born 1957)

Personal information
- Nationality: Malian
- Born: 1957 (age 68–69)

Sport
- Sport: Sprinting
- Event: 400 metres

Yaya Seyba (born 1957) is a Malian sprinter. He competed in the men's 400 metres at the 1988 Summer Olympics.
