= Moses Ugbisien =

Nigerian sprinter

Personal information
- Born: 11 December 1964 (age 61) Gongola State, Nigeria

Sport
- Sport: Track and field
Medal record
Representing Nigeria
Olympic Games
Bronze medal – third place	1984 Los Angeles	4x400 m
African Championships
Silver medal – second place	1984 Rabat	4×400 m
Silver medal – second place	1985 Cairo	4×400 m
Bronze medal – third place	1988 Annaba	400 m
Summer Universiade
Silver medal – second place	1987 Zagreb	400 m

Moses Omote Ugbisien (born 11 December 1964) is a Nigerian athlete who competed mainly in the 400 metres.

Ugbisien is from the Delta State in Nigeria and is of Yoruban ancestry.

He competed for Nigeria in the 1984 Summer Olympics held in Los Angeles, United States in the 4 x 400 metre relay where he won the bronze medal with his teammates Sunday Uti, Rotimi Peters and Innocent Egbunike.

Ugbisie competed for the Wayland Baptist Pioneers,, Seton Hall Pirates, and Texas Southern Tigers track and field teams in the NCAA and NAIA.

He also competed for Nigeria in the 1988 Summer Olympics in Seoul, South Korea.
