= Elijah Sogomo =

Kenyan sprinter

Personal information
- Nationality: Kenyan
- Born: 9 March 1954 (age 72)

Sport
- Sport: Sprinting
- Event: 4 × 400 metres relay

Elijah Sogomo (born 9 March 1954) is a Kenyan sprinter. He competed in the men's 4 × 400 metres relay at the 1984 Summer Olympics.
