= Jason Opicho =

Kenyan sprinter

Personal information
- Nationality: Kenyan
- Born: 1960 (age 65–66)

Sport
- Sport: Sprinting
- Event: 4 × 400 metres relay

Jason Opicho (born 1960) is a Kenyan sprinter. He competed in the men's 4 × 400 metres relay at the 1984 Summer Olympics.
