= Mozambique at the Olympics =

- IOC code: MOZ
- NOC: Comité Olímpico Nacional de Moçambique
- Website: com-cga.co.mz (in Portuguese)
- Medals Ranked 113th: Gold 1 Silver 0 Bronze 1 Total 2

Summer appearances
- 1980; 1984; 1988; 1992; 1996; 2000; 2004; 2008; 2012; 2016; 2020; 2024

Mozambique has competed in 12 Summer Olympic Games, starting at the 1980 Olympics in Moscow, Russia. The nation has never competed in the Winter Olympic Games.

== Medal tables ==
=== Medals by Summer Games ===
Games	Athletes	Gold	Silver	Bronze	Total	Rank
1980 Moscow	14	0	0	0	0	–
1984 Los Angeles	9	0	0	0	0	–
1988 Seoul	8	0	0	0	0	–
1992 Barcelona	6	0	0	0	0	–
1996 Atlanta	3	0	0	1	1	71
2000 Sydney	4	1	0	0	1	50
2004 Athens	4	0	0	0	0	–
2008 Beijing	4	0	0	0	0	–
2012 London	6	0	0	0	0	–
2016 Rio de Janeiro	6	0	0	0	0	–
2020 Tokyo	10	0	0	0	0	–
2024 Paris	7	0	0	0	0	–
2028 Los Angeles	future event					
2032 Brisbane	future event					
Total		1	0	1	2	113

=== Medals by sport ===
Sport	Gold	Silver	Bronze	Total
Athletics	1	0	1	2
Totals (1 entries)	1	0	1	2

== List of medalists ==
Medal	Name	Games	Sport	Event
Bronze	Maria de Lurdes Mutola	1996 Atlanta	Athletics	Women's 800 metres
Gold	Maria de Lurdes Mutola	2000 Sydney	Athletics	Women's 800 metres

== See also ==
- List of flag bearers for Mozambique at the Olympics
