= Linos Petridis =

Cypriot swimmer (born 1961)

Personal information
- Born: 16 June 1961 (age 65)

Sport
- Sport: Swimming

Linos Petridis (born 16 June 1961) is a Cypriot swimmer. He competed in the men's 100 metre butterfly at the 1980 Summer Olympics.
