= Peter Morris (swimmer) =

British swimmer

Personal information
- Born: 30 November 1961 (age 64)

Sport
- Sport: Swimming

Peter Morris (born 30 November 1961) is a British swimmer. He competed in the men's 200 metre butterfly at the 1980 Summer Olympics.
