= Yun Nam-han =

South Korean sprinter

Personal information
- Nationality: South Korean
- Born: 16 November 1968 (age 57)

Korean name
- Hangul: 윤남한
- Hanja: 尹南漢
- RR: Yun Namhan
- MR: Yun Namhan

Sport
- Sport: Sprinting
- Event: 400 metres

Yun Nam-han (born 16 November 1968) is a South Korean sprinter. He competed in the men's 400 metres at the 1988 Summer Olympics.

Yun attended Sungkyunkwan University. In July 1986, he was part of the men's 4 × 400 metres relay team which set the new South Korean national record of 3:10.17, along with Sim Deok-seop, Jeong Han-ju (정한주; 鄭翰珠), and Yu Tae-gyeong (유태경; 柳泰慶). At the Korean Broadcasting System Cup in June 1987, he set the new national record of 47.28 seconds in the men's 400 metres, beating the previous record of 47.29 seconds set by Ku Bon-chil (구본칠; 具本七) in 1975. He again set the new national record the following year, improving to 47.12 seconds at the 42nd National Track and Field Meet (전국육상선수권대회) in June 1988; that record stood until June 1991 when Son Ju-il (손주일; 孫周日) achieved a time of 46.43 seconds at the 45th National Track and Field Meet. At the 71st Korean National Sports Festival in October 1991, Yun came in first place in the men's 400 metres with a time of 47.02 seconds. By 1993 he was in mandatory military service, and represented the Korea Armed Forces Athletic Corps at the 22nd National Assorted Track and Field Meet (전국종별육상선수권대회).
