= Steve Griffiths (athlete) =

Jamaican sprinter (born 1964)

Personal information
- Nationality: Jamaican
- Born: 30 June 1964 (age 62)

Sport
- Sport: Sprinting
- Event: 4 × 400 metres relay

Steve Griffiths (born 30 June 1964) is a Jamaican sprinter. He competed in the men's 4 × 400 metres relay at the 1984 Summer Olympics. Griffiths finished sixth in the 400 metres at the 1983 Pan American Games.

Griffiths competed for the Auburn Tigers track and field team in the NCAA.
