= Ray Armstead =

American sprinter

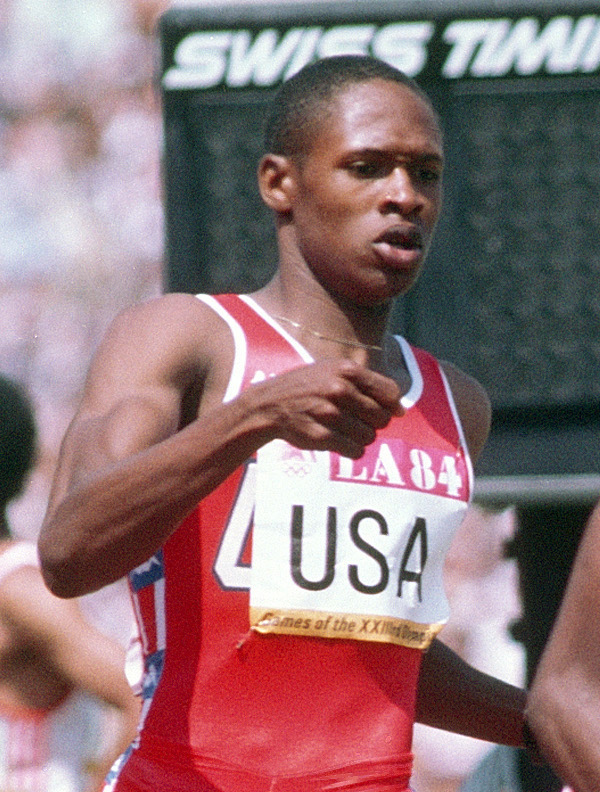
- Ray Armstead (1984).

Personal information
- Full name: Ray Ricky Armstead
- Born: May 27, 1960 (age 66) St. Louis, Missouri, U.S.

Sport
- University team: Truman State University
Medal record
Men's athletics
Representing the United States
Olympic Games
Gold medal – first place	1984 Los Angeles	4 × 400 m relay

Ray Ricky Armstead (born May 27, 1960 in St. Louis, Missouri) is an American former track athlete who specialized in the 400 meters. He was a 1984 Summer Olympics gold medalist in the men's 4 × 400 meter relay. In the 1985 IAAF Grand Prix season, he won the 400 m in Rieti (time 45.24s) and West Berlin (45.36s) and came second in the final in Rome (45.24s). In 1989 he contested the US Trials in Baton Rouge for 1989 the World Indoor Championships. As of 2020, he was an elementary-school art teacher in the Hazelwood School District.

== Sources ==
- Evans, Hilary; Gjerde, Arild; Heijmans, Jeroen; Mallon, Bill; et al. "Ray Armstead". Olympics at Sports-Reference.com. Sports Reference LLC. Archived from the original on 2020-04-18.
