= College of the Marists =

Palace Boaventura Rodrigues de Sousa
- Palacete Boaventura Rodrigues de Sousa
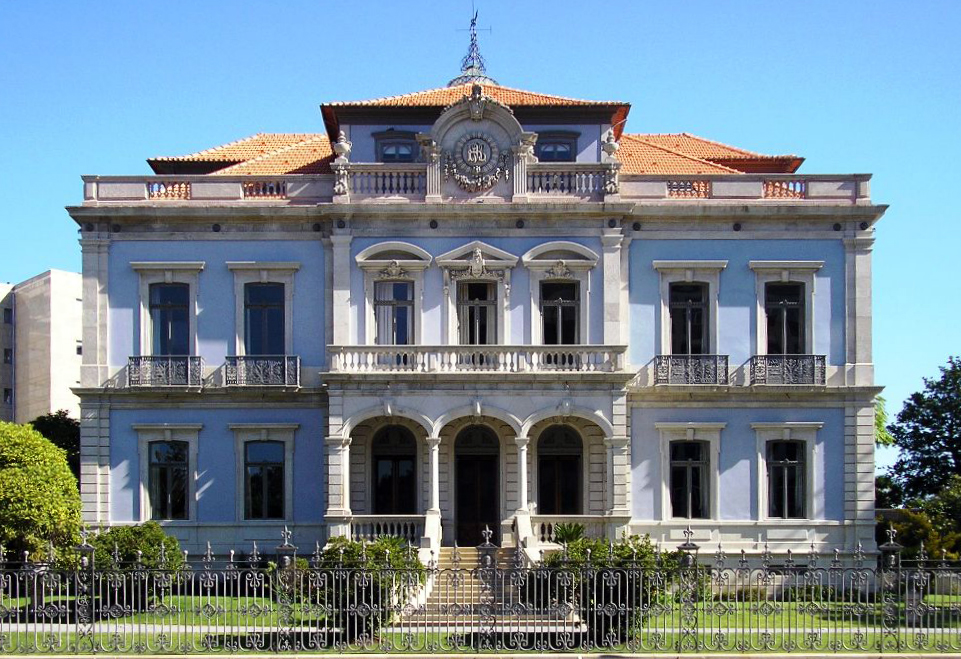
- The front facade of the old Marist Brothers college
- Interactive map of the Palace Boaventura Rodrigues de Sousa area
- Alternative names: College Marits

General information
- Status: Built and in needing of restoration
- Type: Headquarters
- Architectural style: Neoclassic
- Location: Lordelo do Ouro e Massarelos, Av. Boa Vista 1336 to 1354, Porto, Portugal
- Coordinates: 41°9′36″N 8°38′23″W
- Construction started: 1895
- Completed: 1899
- Opened: 1900
- Inaugurated: 1900
- Owner: Portuguese Republic

Height
- Height: 25 m

Technical details
- Material: Granite
- Floor count: 3

Design and construction
- Architect: Joel da Silva Pereira

The Palacete Boaventura Rodrigues de Sousa or (Portuguese: Colégio dos Maristas) was a former-college in the civil parish of Lordelo do Ouro e Massarelos, in the municipality of Porto, in the Portuguese district of the same name.

== History ==
Born in Vairão, Vila do Conde, October 20, 1848 and died in Copenhagen, August 31, 1908, the rich Portuguese emigrant Boaventura Rodrigues de Sousa, who amassed a fortune in Santos, Brazil, where he was one of the founders of the "Sociedade Portuguesa de Beneficência de Santos", decided to ask the construction of the Hause to his own. He returned to Portugal, becoming a major investor in various ventures across the Greater Porto region. Although its date of construction was unclear, there was a petition to the local government on 9 April 1895, by the builder João Gomes da Silva Guerra, suggesting this. The councilman Boaventura Rodrigues de Sousa, proprietary owner of the land on Avenida da Boavista (referred to on 9 April) and may have been the reason for the monogram inscribed on the cornices. The building and landscaping was attributed to Joel Pereira, owing to Boaventura Rodrigues de Sousa having many similar requirements for other buildings along the Praça Gomes Teixeira, including an example on the corner of Rua das Carmelitas of the same authorship whose used a monogram also inscribed with the owners acronyms. From an inventory elaborated by the Repartição de Arborização e Jardinagem (Landscaping and Gardening division) of Porto the site was populated with Camélias japónicas (34), Palmeiras spp. (10), Rododendron (4), Liriodendron tulipífera (2), Tílias cordatas (2), Tílias argentea (6), Tílias tomentosas (2), Sequóia and Pitosporum.

The paintings on the walls in the Music Salon were executed in 1899 by A. Mello.

Construction of the wall oriented towards the Avenida da Boavista occurred in 1900.

Between 1910 and 1926, the residence was unoccupied as the owners, Adelaide Chambers de Sousa moved her residence to another building along Avenida da Boavista.

Beginning between 1926 and 1958, it began to be used a college, specifically the Colégio de Nossa Senhora do Rosário (College of Our Lady of the Rosary), but still under the ownership of Adelaide Chambers. Between 1959 and 1991, it was the seat and school of the Colégio dos Maristas (College of the Marist Brothers).

Owing to its several years of service and architecture, a plan to classify the building began on 22 January 1982. A dispatch was issued on 13 March by the Secretário de Estado da Cultura (Secretary-of-State for Culture), yet the former residence remained unoccupied between 1991 and 1995.

In 1995, the property changed ownership and began to be the title of BOAPOR, who seat was on Rua do Virgílio Correia, 49A in Lisbon.

A new process was open on 9 May 1996, by the Vice-President of IPPAR, but little advanced until 19 September 2000 (when a dispatch was ordered to reconfigure the area of intervention), this after a proposal was issued on 21 August 2000, by the DRPorto to alter the classification area. A project to rehabilitate the building, under the direction of architects António Portugal Mendonça and Manuel Amorim Reis, received the João de Almeida Prize in 2006, from the municipality of Porto. On 20 March 2012, the DRCNorte proposed classifying the structure as a Monumento of Interesse Público, which received support and was designated on 14 November 2012, along with the establishment of ZPE (Special Protection Area) designation (Announcement 13694/2012, Diário da Republica, Série 2, 220).

The building was sold in late 2016 to a businessman in the vehicle inspection sector. The asking price set by Novo Banco was 8 million euros. After this, the property and its house was sold again for an unknown amount for an undisclosed investor, some says someone in Asia, others say Arabian properties or even others, however the empty house is secured by third Company. The condition of the house, which once got a restoration of € 5 million, is deteriorating, but not damaged with roof down as the house aside.

== Architecture ==
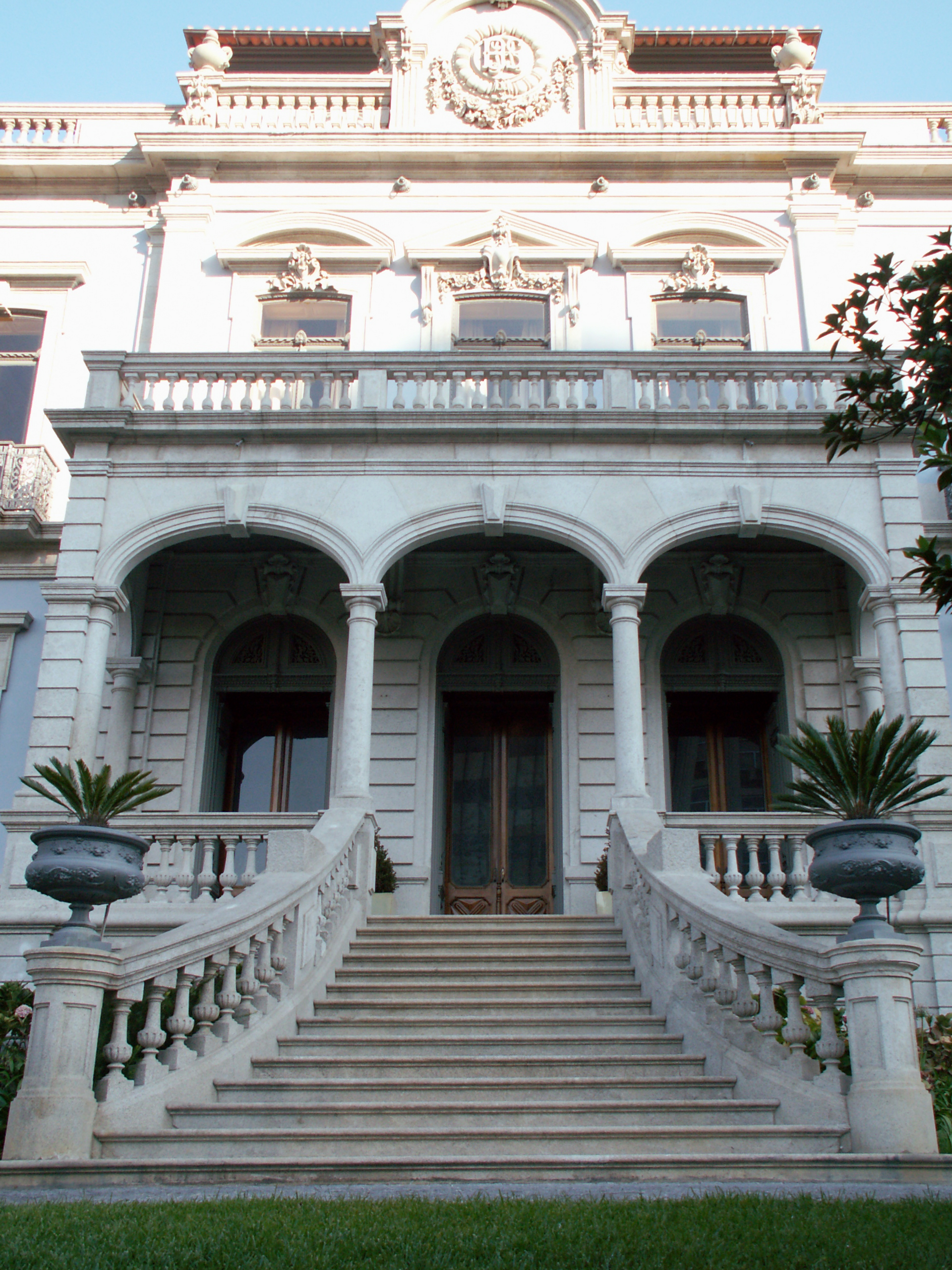
The main staircase of to the college

The former college is located in an urban context, addressing the Avenida da Boavista to the south and the Rua de Pedro Hispano to the north. To the east of the avenue are other palacettes, among them the former residence of the Viscountess Santiago Lobão, (already classified). To the west are larger buildings, most modern, including the Hotel Crowne Plaza and Sherraton. The building is sited on an elevated plateau relative to the Avenida da Boavista taking the form of a trapezoid, with the rear of the building limited by a high, granite wall supporting the terrain. In the front, along Avenida da Boavista is a similar granite wall, but of smaller dimensions, surrounded by an iron gate.

The rectangular building with basement is two stories with a mansard roof. A simple plan, the principal facade (oriented to the Avenida da Boavista) includes a porch fronted by a staircase and defined by balustrade in granite. Flanking this portico are windows on the ground and second floors framed in granite and curved lintels. On its rear profile, the building is marked by a slender and aligned aperture, while the side elevations, equal to one another, features a ground floor with four windows and an upper floor with balcony doors. The surfaces have a continuous cornice in granite with closed areas with vases, interrupted the main facade in the center by a small backrest surmounted by a perfect arch back inscribed with the monogram BRS.

The interior space is marked in the center by a double bifurcated staircase lit wood above by a skylight. The remaining rooms are organized around the staircase in a symmetrical manner. The treatment on doors, including etched glass, are framed in granite or crafted wood.
