= Mussa Chamaune =

Mozambican canoeist

Personal information
- Born: 19 August 1992 (age 33)

Sport
- Sport: Canoe sprint

Mussa Chamaune (born 19 August 1992) is a Mozambican canoeist. He competed in the men's C-1 1000 metres event at the 2016 Summer Olympics.

== 2016 ==
Together with his colleague, canoeist Joaquim Lobo, he competed at Rio de Janeiro at the 2016 Summer Olympics. Lobo and Chamaune are the inaugural Mozambican canoeists at the modern Olympic Games. He qualified in the round from 29 March to 2 April 2016 in Pretoria, South Africa. Throughout the preparation, the two canoeists received extensive support from the Brazilian Canoe Association, but the cooperation ended due to differences.

Chamaune competed both in the single canoe to over 1000 m and together with Lobo in double canoe over 1000 m. In single canoe, he reached with a time of 5: 00.454 min (7th place) in the semi-finals, then retired with a time of 5: 07.281 from min (8th place). In double canoe with Lobo, he reached the final and finished with a time of 4:38.732 min the 11th place.
