= Jorge Duvane =

Mozambican middle-distance runner

Personal information
- Nationality: Mozambican
- Born: 9 September 1982 (age 43)

Sport
- Sport: Middle-distance running
- Event: 800 metres

Jorge Duvane (born 9 September 1982) is a Mozambican middle-distance runner. He competed in the men's 800 metres at the 2000 Summer Olympics.

Olympic Games
| Preceded by Maria Mutola | Flagbearer for Mozambique; Sydney 2000 | Succeeded by Kurt Couto |
