= Steven Sabino =

Mozambican athlete (born 2006)

Personal information
- Nationality: Mozambican
- Born: 24 April 2006 (age 20)

Sport
- Sport: Athletics
- Event: Sprint

Achievements and titles
- Personal bests: 60m: 6.73 (2025) NR; 100m: 10.29s (2025) NR; Long jump: 7.91m (2025) NR
Medal record
Men's athletics
Representing Mozambique
African U18 Championships
Silver medal – second place	2023 Ndola	100m

Steven Sabino (born 24 April 2006) is a sprinter from Mozambique. He is the national record holder over 100 metres and long jump.

== Early and personal life ==
He was born in Mozambique but raised in Johannesburg, he attended King Edward VII School, Johannesburg. A talented school boy long jumper and sprinter, he ran under 11 seconds for the 100 metres as a 15-year-old, and ran 10.88 seconds in November 2021. He trained as a member of the Diamond Elite Camp in Germiston from the age of eleven years-old. The son of a physicist, Sabino also excelled in mathematics, and was offered a full scholarship to UCLA in the United States in 2025.

== Career ==
He is a member of Diamond Athletics Club in South Africa. In April 2023, he won silver in the 100 metres at the 2023 African Athletics U18 Championships in Ndola, running 10.48 seconds in the final, having run 10.46 in the heats.

In March 2024, he lowered his personal best for the 100 metres to 10.35 seconds in Johannesburg and in the process set a new Mozambique national record. In June 2024, he competed in the 100 metres at the African Athletics Championships in Douala, Cameroon. He competed in the 100 metres at the 2024 Paris Olympics, but was disqualified after a false start in his heat.

In February 2025, he set a personal best or 7.91 metres in the long jump whilst competing in Pretoria. That month, he placed third in the 60 metres at the Curro Podium Grand Finale competitions, running in 6.73 seconds and finishing behind Bayanda Walaza. In June 2025, he lowered the Mozambique national record for the 100 metres to 10.29 seconds, in Potchefstroom.

As a freshman at University of California, Los Angeles, Sabino had a second place behind Keenan Kuntz in the 60 metres in a time of 6.80 at The Spokane Sports Showcase, on 16 January 2026, also competing in the long jump at the meeting.
