= Pedro Gonçalvo =

Mozambican sprinter

Personal information
- Nationality: Mozambican
- Born: 13 March 1964 (age 62)

Sport
- Sport: Sprinting
- Event: 4 × 400 metres relay

Pedro Gonçalvo (born 13 March 1964) is a Mozambican sprinter. He competed in the men's 4 × 400 metres relay at the 1984 Summer Olympics.
