= Elijah Nkala =

Zimbabwean sprinter

Personal information
- Nationality: Zimbabwean
- Born: 7 July 1964 (age 62)

Sport
- Sport: Sprinting
- Event: 400 metres

Elijah Nkala (born 7 July 1964) is a Zimbabwean sprinter. He competed in the men's 400 metres at the 1988 Summer Olympics.
