= Mozambican Athletics Federation =

Sports governing body in Mozambique

- Federação Moçambicana de Atletismo
- Sport: Athletics
- Abbreviation: FMA
- Founded: 1978
- Affiliation: World Athletics
- Affiliation date: 1978
- Regional affiliation: CAA
- Headquarters: Av. Mao Tse Tung 217, Parque dos Continuadores, P.O. Box 1094, Maputo
- President: Francisco Joaquim Manheche
- Secretary: Nelson Nhamussa
- (Mozambique)

The Mozambican Athletics Federation (Portuguese: Federação Moçambicana de Atletismo, FMA) is the governing body for the sport of athletics in Mozambique.

== History ==
FMA was founded in 1978, and was affiliated to the IAAF the same year.

Former president was Sarifa Magide. She was re-elected for the period 2008-2012 in December 2008. Shafee Sidade was elected as a President between 2013 - 2017. In February 2013, Shafee Sidat was elected new president. The current President is Francisco Joaquim Manheche. He was elected in September 2017.

== Affiliations ==
- World Athletics
- Confederation of African Athletics (CAA)
- Asociación Iberoamericana de Atletismo (AIA; Ibero-American Athletics Association)

Moreover, it is part of the following national organisations:

- Mozambique Olympic Committee (COM; Portuguese: Comité Olímpico de Moçambique)

== National records ==
FMA maintains the national records.
