= Cees Vervoorn =

Dutch swimmer (born 1960)

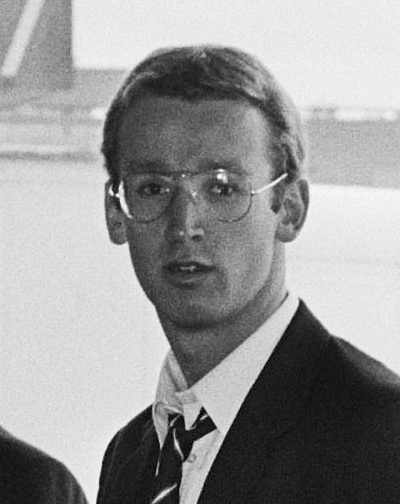
- Cees Vervoorn in 1980

Personal information
- Born: 11 April 1960 (age 66) The Hague, Netherlands
- Height: 1.91 m (6 ft 3 in)
- Weight: 83 kg (183 lb)

Sport
- Sport: Swimming
- Club: ZIAN, Den Haag

Cornelis "Cees" Vervoorn (born 11 April 1960) is a retired Dutch swimmer. He competed at the 1976, 1980 and 1984 Summer Olympics in seven events; in 1980, he finished fourth, sixth and seventh in the 100 m and 200 m butterfly and 4 × 100 m medley relay, respectively. In the 100 m butterfly final, he clocked 55.25, missing the bronze medal by 0.12 s. In the semifinal he swam 55.02, qualifying first for the final.

He won a national title in the 100 m freestyle in 1978 and between 1977 and 1984 set more than 30 national records in various butterfly and freestyle events.

== Biography ==
Vervoorn was born in the Hague, where he completed his secondary education. After spending a year at the Southern Illinois University in the United States, he entered the Vrije Universiteit in Amsterdam (1980–1987). He then worked as a swimming coach and lector in Shanghai, China. In 1992 he defended a PhD on the "Neuro-endocrine aspects of exercise and training" at the Utrecht University. Meanwhile, he was the national swimming coach at the 1984, 1988 and 1992 Olympics and the head of the Dutch Paralympics Team in 1996 and 2000 (he is not handicapped). Between 1992 and 1999 he was heading the top sport division at the Dutch Olympic Committee. In 1999 he became director of the Academy of Physical Education (Academie voor Lichamelijke Opvoeding). Since 2010 he works as a lecturer in top sport. Vervoorn was member of Sportraad Amsterdam.

== Selected publications ==
- Eric Taylor; W.J. Ponsen; C. Vervoorn (1990). Krachttraining: een instructieboek voor mannen en vrouwen. Kosmos. ISBN 978-90-215-1567-0.
- Cornelis Vervoorn (1992). Neuro-endocrine Aspects of Exercise and Training. Universiteit Utrecht. ISBN 978-90-393-0051-0.
- J.R. Elzerman; A. van de Ven; C. Vervoorn (1994). Sprinttraining. KNVB.
- M.Th.M. Sturkenboom; G. Veltman; Ph.E. Wagner; C. Vervoorn; E.R. Ruts (1994). Bouwstenen voor topsportbeleid: een advies over de ontwikkeling van model topsportbeleidsplan. NOC-NSF.
- Arie Koops; Cees Vervoorn; Marleen van den Berg (1999). Circadiane ritmen en het lichamelijk prestatievermogen: de invloed van jet-lag en melatonine. NOC*NSF.
- Jan Rijpstra; Annemarie Kaptein; Cornelis Vervoorn; John Brandsen (2000). Nederland op de Paralympics 2000: een impressie uit Sydney. Stichting Hefaïstos. ISBN 978-90-76574-10-3.
- C. Vervoorn (2011). A Life Changing Experience!' : Durven wij nog te dromen?. Amsterdam University Press. ISBN 978-90-5629-693-3.
