= Kevin Loforte =

Mozambican judoka (born 1997)

Personal information
- Nationality: Mozambique
- Born: 27 February 1997 (age 28); Maputo, Mozambique
- Occupation: Judoka

Sport
- Sport: Judo
- Weight class: –66 kg

Profile at external databases
- IJF: 11258
- JudoInside.com: 90481
- Updated on 31 October 2021

Kevin Loforte (born 27 February 1997) is a Mozambican judoka. He competed in the 2020 Summer Olympics.

At the 2021 African Judo Championships held in Dakar, Senegal, he won one of the bronze medals in the men's 66 kg event.

Olympic Games
Preceded by Joaquim Lobo	Flag bearer for Mozambique; Tokyo 2020 with Rady Adosinda Gramane	Succeeded by Alcinda Lucas Dos Santos; Matthew Lawrence
