= Desai Wynter =

Sprinter

Personal information
- Nationality: American Virgin Islander
- Born: June 5, 1966 (age 59)

Sport
- Sport: Sprinting
- Event: 400 metres

Desai Wynter (born June 5, 1966) is a sprinter who represents the United States Virgin Islands. He competed in the 400 metres at the 1988 Summer Olympics and the 1992 Summer Olympics.
