= André Titos =

Mozambican sprinter

Personal information
- Nationality: Mozambican
- Born: 19 February 1958 (age 68)

Sport
- Sport: Sprinting
- Event: 4 × 400 metres relay

André Titos (born 19 February 1958) is a Mozambican sprinter. He competed in the men's 4 × 400 metres relay at the 1984 Summer Olympics.
