= Joaquim Lobo =

Mozambican canoeist (born 1995)

Personal information
- Born: 6 January 1995 (age 31) Maputo, Mozambique
- Height: 172 cm (5 ft 8 in)
- Weight: 66 kg (146 lb)

Sport
- Sport: Canoe sprint
- Events: C-1 & C-2
- Club: Clube Marítimo de Desportos
Medal record
Men's canoe sprint
Representing Mozambique
African Games
Silver medal – second place	2019 Rabat	C-1 200 m
Bronze medal – third place	2011 Maputo	C-2 1000 m

Joaquim Lobo (born 6 January 1995 in Maputo) is a Mozambican canoeist. He competed in the men's C-1 200 metres event and the men's C-2 1000 metres event at the 2016 Summer Olympics. He did not qualify for the semifinals in the men's C-1 200m event. Along with partner Mussa Chamaune, he finished in 11th place in the C-2 1000m event. Lobo was the flag bearer for Mozambique during the Parade of Nations. In June 2021, he qualified to represent Mozambique at the 2020 Summer Olympics.

Olympic Games
Preceded by Kurt Couto	Flagbearer for Mozambique; Rio de Janeiro 2016	Succeeded by Rady Adosinda Gramane; Kevin Loforte
