= Gaily Dube =

Zimbabwean sprinter

Personal information
- Nationality: Zimbabwean
- Born: 25 July 1969 (age 56)

Sport
- Sport: Sprinting
- Event: 100 metres

Gaily Dube (born 25 July 1969) is a Zimbabwean sprinter. She competed in the 100 metres at the 1988 Summer Olympics and the 1992 Summer Olympics.
