= Sergio Fafitine =

Mozambican swimmer (born 1969)

Personal information
- Born: 10 August 1969 (age 57)

Sport
- Sport: Swimming

Sergio Jorge Fafitine (born 10 August 1969) is a Mozambican former breaststroke, butterfly and freestyle swimmer. He competed at the 1988 Summer Olympics and the 1992 Summer Olympics. Fafitine was the flag bearer for Mozambique in the Seoul 1988 opening ceremony.
