= Pedro Mulomo =

Mozambican long-distance runner

Personal information
- Nationality: Mozambican
- Born: 1954 (age 71–72)

Sport
- Sport: Long-distance running
- Event: 5000 metres

Pedro Mulomo (born 1954) is a former Mozambican long-distance runner.

He is still the current national record holder in the 5000 metres with a time of 14:26.6 set in Maputo, Mozambique on 31 March 1980 also the current 10000 metres national record holder with a time of 30:09.3 set on 16 May 1982.

He represented his country internationally and competed in the men's 5000 metres at the 1980 Summer Olympics.
