= Leonardo Loforte =

Mozambican sprinter

Personal information
- Nationality: Mozambican
- Born: 4 December 1956 (age 69)

Sport
- Sport: Sprinting
- Event: 400 metres

Leonardo Loforte (born 4 December 1956) is a Mozambican sprinter. He competed in the men's 400 metres at the 1984 Summer Olympics.
