= Lucas Sinoia =

Mozambican boxer (born 1966)

Personal information
- Nationality: Mozambican
- Born: 3 February 1966 (age 60)

Sport
- Sport: Boxing

Lucas Januario Sinoia (born 22 March 1966) is a Mozambican former boxer. He competed at the 1988 Summer Olympics and the 1996 Summer Olympics.
