= Jaime Rodrigues =

Mozambican sprinter

Personal information
- Nationality: Mozambican
- Born: 6 June 1955 (age 71)

Sport
- Sport: Sprinting
- Event: 400 metres

Jaime Nharimue Rodrigues (born 6 June 1955) is a Mozambican former sprinter. He competed in the 400 metres at the 1988 Summer Olympics and the 1992 Summer Olympics.
