= Henrique Ferreira =

Mozambican sprinter

Personal information
- Nationality: Mozambican
- Born: 16 November 1960 (age 65)

Sport
- Sport: Sprinting
- Event: 200 metres

Henrique Ferreira (born 16 November 1960) is a Mozambican sprinter. He competed in the men's 200 metres at the 1984 Summer Olympics.
