= Raimundo Franisse =

Mozambican swimmer

Personal information
- Full name: Raimundo Franisse
- Nationality: Mozambique

Sport
- Sport: Swimming
- Strokes: butterfly

Raimundo Franisse is a former Mozambican swimmer specialized in the 100 metres and 200 metres butterfly.

He is listed as the best Mozambican swimmer ever. He competed in two events at the 1980 Summer Olympics. At the 1980 Summer Olympics opening ceremony he was the flag bearer for Mozambique during the Parade of Nations.

Franisse featured as himself in one episode of the television mini series “Moscow 1980: Games of the XXII Olympiad”.

The Raimundo Franisse Pool in Maputo, Mozambique, is named after him.
