= Bogusław Zychowicz =

Polish swimmer

Personal information
- Born: 18 May 1961 (age 65) Mielec, Poland

Sport
- Sport: Swimming
- Strokes: butterfly

Bogusław Zychowicz (born 18 May 1961) is a Polish butterfly swimmer. He competed in two events at the 1980 Summer Olympics.
