= Sunday Uti =

Nigerian sprinter (born 1962)

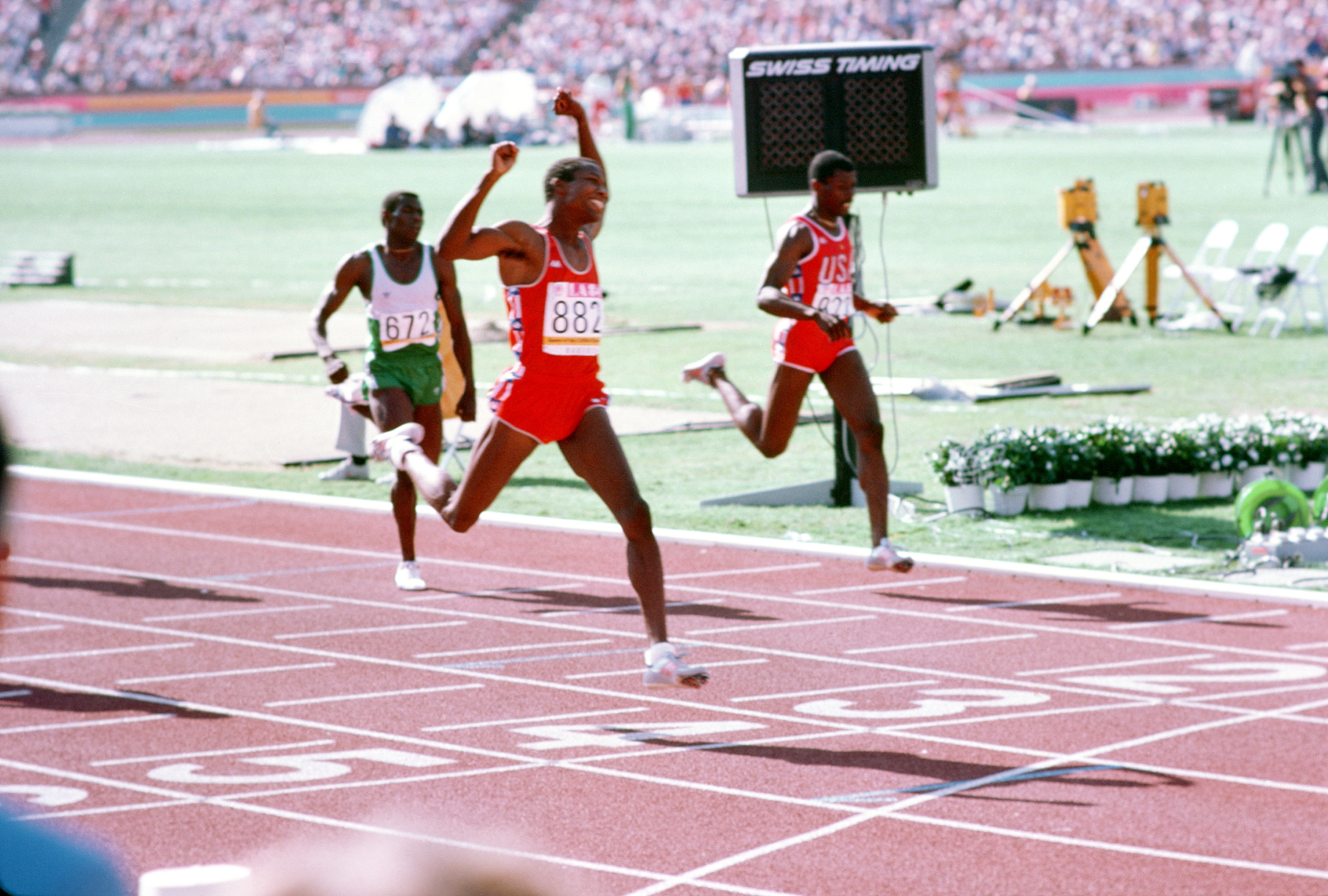
- Uti (672) during the 400m final at the 1984 Olympics

Personal information
- Born: 23 October 1962 (age 63) Lagos, Nigeria

Sport
- Sport: Track and field
Medal record
Representing Nigeria
Olympic Games
Bronze medal – third place	1984 Los Angeles	4x400 m relay
African Championships
Silver medal – second place	1984 Rabat	400 m
Silver medal – second place	1984 Rabat	4×400 m relay
Silver medal – second place	1985 Cairo	4×400 m relay
Summer Universiade
Gold medal – first place	1983 Edmonton	400 m
Bronze medal – third place	1985 Kobe	400 m

Sunday Uti (born 23 October 1962) is a former Nigerian sprinter who won an Olympic bronze medal in 4 x 400 metres relay in 1984 Summer Olympics. He finished sixth in the final of the individual 400 metres contest.

Uti was an All-American sprinter for the Iowa State Cyclones track and field team in the NCAA.

In addition he won the gold medal at the 1983 Summer Universiade, and a bronze medal in 1985. He also took the silver medal at the 1984 African Championships.

== Achievements ==
Year	Competition	Venue	Position	Event	Notes
Representing Nigeria
1983	Summer Universiade	Edmonton, Canada	1st	400 metres	
1984	African Championships	Rabat, Morocco	2nd	400 metres	
1984	Olympic Games	Los Angeles, United States	3rd	4x400 m relay	
1984	Olympic Games	Los Angeles, United States	6th	400 metres	
1985	Summer Universiade	Kobe, Japan	3rd	400 metres	
