= National Olympic Committee of Mozambique =

National Olympic Committee

- Country: Mozambique
- [[|]]
- Code: MOZ
- Recognized: 1979
- Continental Association: ANOCA
- Headquarters: Maputo, Mozambique
- President: Anibal Manave
- Secretary General: Penalva Cezar
- Website: com-cga.co.mz (in Portuguese)

The National Olympic Committee of Mozambique (Portuguese: Comitê Olímpico Nacional de Moçambique) (IOC code: MOZ) is the National Olympic Committee representing Mozambique.

== See also ==
- Mozambique at the Olympics
- Mozambique at the Commonwealth Games
