= Athletics at the 1991 Pan American Games – Men's 4 × 400 metres relay =

Men's 4 × 400 metres relay at the Pan American Games

The men's 4 × 400 metres relay event at the 1991 Pan American Games was held in Havana, Cuba on 11 August.

== Results ==
Rank	Nation	Athletes	Time	Notes
1st place, gold medalist(s)	Cuba	Agustín Pavó, Héctor Herrera, Jorge Valentín, Lázaro Martínez	3:01.93	
2nd place, silver medalist(s)	United States	Clarence Daniel, Quincy Watts, Jeff Reynolds, Gabriel Luke	3:02.02	
3rd place, bronze medalist(s)	Jamaica	Michael Anderson, Howard Burnett, Seymour Fagan, Patrick O'Connor	3:02.12	
4	Trinidad and Tobago	Patrick Delice, Alvin Daniel, Robert Guy, Ian Morris	3:06.91	
5	Barbados	Terry Harewood, Ronald Thorne, Steven Roberts, Seibert Straughn	3:07.74	
6	Canada	Mike McLean, Anthony Wilson, Troy Jackson, Anton Skerrit	3:08.36	
7	Saint Vincent and the Grenadines	Dexter Browne, Eversley Linley, Eswort Coombs, Kent Dennie	3:20.33	
8	Belize	John Palacio, Brent Hamilton, Carlton Usher, Michael Joseph	3:21.24	
