= List of World Athletics Championships medalists (men) =

Men have contested events at the World Athletics Championships since its inauguration in 1983. The top three athletes in each event win gold, silver and bronze medals, respectively. A one-off edition of the championships was held in 1976 for the men's 50 kilometres race walk only, as the International Olympic Committee excluded that event for the Olympic athletics programme that year.

== Track ==
=== 100 m ===
Championships	Gold	Silver	Bronze
1983 Helsinki	Carl Lewis (USA)	Calvin Smith (USA)	Emmit King (USA)
1987 Rome	Carl Lewis (USA)	Raymond Stewart (JAM)	Linford Christie (GBR)
1991 Tokyo	Carl Lewis (USA)	Leroy Burrell (USA)	Dennis Mitchell (USA)
1993 Stuttgart	Linford Christie (GBR)	Andre Cason (USA)	Dennis Mitchell (USA)
1995 Gothenburg	Donovan Bailey (CAN)	Bruny Surin (CAN)	Ato Boldon (TRI)
1997 Athens	Maurice Greene (USA)	Donovan Bailey (CAN)	Tim Montgomery (USA)
1999 Seville	Maurice Greene (USA)	Bruny Surin (CAN)	Dwain Chambers (GBR)
2001 Edmonton	Maurice Greene (USA)	Bernard Williams (USA)	Ato Boldon (TRI)
2003 Saint-Denis	Kim Collins (SKN)	Darrel Brown (TRI)	Darren Campbell (GBR)
2005 Helsinki	Justin Gatlin (USA)	Michael Frater (JAM)	Kim Collins (SKN)
2007 Osaka	Tyson Gay (USA)	Derrick Atkins (BAH)	Asafa Powell (JAM)
2009 Berlin	Usain Bolt (JAM)	Tyson Gay (USA)	Asafa Powell (JAM)
2011 Daegu	Yohan Blake (JAM)	Walter Dix (USA)	Kim Collins (SKN)
2013 Moscow	Usain Bolt (JAM)	Justin Gatlin (USA)	Nesta Carter (JAM)
2015 Beijing	Usain Bolt (JAM)	Justin Gatlin (USA)	Trayvon Bromell (USA) Andre De Grasse (CAN)
2017 London	Justin Gatlin (USA)	Christian Coleman (USA)	Usain Bolt (JAM)
2019 Doha	Christian Coleman (USA)	Justin Gatlin (USA)	Andre De Grasse (CAN)
2022 Eugene	Fred Kerley (USA)	Marvin Bracy (USA)	Trayvon Bromell (USA)
2023 Budapest	Noah Lyles (USA)	Letsile Tebogo (BOT)	Zharnel Hughes (GBR)
2025 Tokyo	Oblique Seville (JAM)	Kishane Thompson (JAM)	Noah Lyles (USA)

==== Medalists by country ====
Rank	Nation	Gold	Silver	Bronze	Total
1	United States (USA)	12	11	7	30
2	Jamaica (JAM)	5	3	4	12
3	Canada (CAN)	1	3	2	6
4	Great Britain (GBR)	1	0	4	5
5	Saint Kitts and Nevis (SKN)	1	0	2	3
6	Trinidad and Tobago (TRI)	0	1	2	3
7	Bahamas (BAH)	0	1	0	1
7	Botswana (BOT)	0	1	0	1

=== 200 m ===
Championships	Gold	Silver	Bronze
1983 Helsinki	Calvin Smith (USA)	Elliott Quow (USA)	Pietro Mennea (ITA)
1987 Rome	Calvin Smith (USA)	Gilles Quénéhervé (FRA)	John Regis (GBR)
1991 Tokyo	Michael Johnson (USA)	Frankie Fredericks (NAM)	Atlee Mahorn (CAN)
1993 Stuttgart	Frankie Fredericks (NAM)	John Regis (GBR)	Carl Lewis (USA)
1995 Gothenburg	Michael Johnson (USA)	Frankie Fredericks (NAM)	Jeff Williams (USA)
1997 Athens	Ato Boldon (TRI)	Frankie Fredericks (NAM)	Claudinei da Silva (BRA)
1999 Seville	Maurice Greene (USA)	Claudinei da Silva (BRA)	Francis Obikwelu (NGR)
2001 Edmonton	Konstantinos Kenteris (GRE)	Christopher Williams (JAM)	Kim Collins (SKN); Shawn Crawford (USA)
2003 Saint-Denis	John Capel Jr. (USA)	Darvis Patton (USA)	Shingo Suetsugu (JPN)
2005 Helsinki	Justin Gatlin (USA)	Wallace Spearmon (USA)	John Capel (USA)
2007 Osaka	Tyson Gay (USA)	Usain Bolt (JAM)	Wallace Spearmon (USA)
2009 Berlin	Usain Bolt (JAM)	Alonso Edward (PAN)	Wallace Spearmon (USA)
2011 Daegu	Usain Bolt (JAM)	Walter Dix (USA)	Christophe Lemaitre (FRA)
2013 Moscow	Usain Bolt (JAM)	Warren Weir (JAM)	Curtis Mitchell (USA)
2015 Beijing	Usain Bolt (JAM)	Justin Gatlin (USA)	Anaso Jobodwana (RSA)
2017 London	Ramil Guliyev (TUR)	Wayde van Niekerk (RSA)	Jereem Richards (TTO)
2019 Doha	Noah Lyles (USA)	Andre De Grasse (CAN)	Álex Quiñónez (ECU)
2022 Eugene	Noah Lyles (USA)	Kenny Bednarek (USA)	Erriyon Knighton (USA)
2023 Budapest	Noah Lyles (USA)	Erriyon Knighton (USA)	Letsile Tebogo (BOT)
2025 Tokyo	Noah Lyles (USA)	Kenny Bednarek (USA)	Bryan Levell (JAM)

==== Medalists by country ====
Rank	Nation	Gold	Silver	Bronze	Total
1	United States (USA)	12	8	8	28
2	Jamaica (JAM)	4	3	1	8
3	Namibia (NAM)	1	3	0	4
4	Trinidad and Tobago (TTO)	1	0	1	2
5	Greece (GRE)	1	0	0	1
5	Turkey (TUR)	1	0	0	1
6	Brazil (BRA)	0	1	1	2
6	Canada (CAN)	0	1	1	2
6	France (FRA)	0	1	1	2
6	Great Britain (GBR)	0	1	1	2
6	South Africa (RSA)	0	1	1	2
7	Panama (PAN)	0	1	0	1
8	Botswana (BOT)	0	0	1	1
8	Ecuador (ECU)	0	0	1	1
8	Italy (ITA)	0	0	1	1
8	Japan (JPN)	0	0	1	1
8	Nigeria (NGR)	0	0	1	1
8	Saint Kitts and Nevis (SKN)	0	0	1	1

=== 400 m ===
Championships	Gold	Silver	Bronze
1983 Helsinki	Bert Cameron (JAM)	Michael Franks (USA)	Sunder Nix (USA)
1987 Rome	Thomas Schönlebe (GDR)	Innocent Egbunike (NGA)	Harry Reynolds (USA)
1991 Tokyo	Antonio Pettigrew (USA)	Roger Black (GBR)	Danny Everett (USA)
1993 Stuttgart	Michael Johnson (USA)	Butch Reynolds (USA)	Samson Kitur (KEN)
1995 Gothenburg	Michael Johnson (USA)	Butch Reynolds (USA)	Greg Haughton (JAM)
1997 Athens	Michael Johnson (USA)	Davis Kamoga (UGA)	Tyree Washington (USA)
1999 Seville	Michael Johnson (USA)	Sanderlei Parrela (BRA)	Alejandro Cárdenas (MEX)
2001 Edmonton	Avard Moncur (BAH)	Ingo Schultz (GER)	Greg Haughton (JAM)
2003 Saint-Denis	Tyree Washington (USA)	Marc Raquil (FRA)	Michael Blackwood (JAM)
2005 Helsinki	Jeremy Wariner (USA)	Andrew Rock (USA)	Tyler Christopher (CAN)
2007 Osaka	Jeremy Wariner (USA)	LaShawn Merritt (USA)	Angelo Taylor (USA)
2009 Berlin	LaShawn Merritt (USA)	Jeremy Wariner (USA)	Renny Quow (TRI)
2011 Daegu	Kirani James (GRN)	LaShawn Merritt (USA)	Kévin Borlée (BEL)
2013 Moscow	LaShawn Merritt (USA)	Tony McQuay (USA)	Luguelín Santos (DOM)
2015 Beijing	Wayde van Niekerk (RSA)	LaShawn Merritt (USA)	Kirani James (GRN)
2017 London	Wayde van Niekerk (RSA)	Steven Gardiner (BAH)	Abdalelah Haroun (QAT)
2019 Doha	Steven Gardiner (BAH)	Anthony Zambrano (COL)	Fred Kerley (USA)
2022 Eugene	Michael Norman (USA)	Kirani James (GRN)	Matthew Hudson-Smith (GBR)
2023 Budapest	Antonio Watson (JAM)	Matthew Hudson-Smith (GBR)	Quincy Hall (USA)
2025 Tokyo	Collen Kebinatshipi (BOT)	Jereem Richards (TTO)	Bayapo Ndori (BOT)

==== Medalists by country ====
Rank	Nation	Gold	Silver	Bronze	Total
1	United States (USA)	11	9	6	27
2	Bahamas (BAH)	2	1	0	3
3	Jamaica (JAM)	2	0	3	5
4	South Africa (RSA)	2	0	0	2
5	Grenada (GRN)	1	1	1	3
6	Botswana (BOT)	1	0	1	2
7	East Germany (GDR)	1	0	0	1
8	Great Britain (GBR)	0	2	1	3
9	Trinidad and Tobago (TRI)	0	1	1	2
10	Brazil (BRA)	0	1	0	1
10	Colombia (COL)	0	1	0	1
10	France (FRA)	0	1	0	1
10	Germany (GER)	0	1	0	1
10	Nigeria (NGR)	0	1	0	1
10	Uganda (UGA)	0	1	0	1
16	Belgium (BEL)	0	0	1	1
16	Canada (CAN)	0	0	1	1
16	Dominican Republic (DOM)	0	0	1	1
16	Kenya (KEN)	0	0	1	1
16	Mexico (MEX)	0	0	1	1
16	Qatar (QAT)	0	0	1	1

=== 800 m ===
Championships	Gold	Silver	Bronze
1983 Helsinki	Willi Wülbeck (FRG)	Rob Druppers (NED)	Joaquim Cruz (BRA)
1987 Rome	Billy Konchellah (KEN)	Peter Elliott (GBR)	José Luíz Barbosa (BRA)
1991 Tokyo	Billy Konchellah (KEN)	José Luíz Barbosa (BRA)	Mark Everett (USA)
1993 Stuttgart	Paul Ruto (KEN)	Giuseppe D'Urso (ITA)	Billy Konchellah (KEN)
1995 Gothenburg	Wilson Kipketer (DEN)	Arthémon Hatungimana (BDI)	Vebjørn Rodal (NOR)
1997 Athens	Wilson Kipketer (DEN)	Norberto Téllez (CUB)	Rich Kenah (USA)
1999 Seville	Wilson Kipketer (DEN)	Hezekiél Sepeng (RSA)	Djabir Saïd-Guerni (ALG)
2001 Edmonton	André Bucher (SUI)	Wilfred Bungei (KEN)	Paweł Czapiewski (POL)
2003 Saint-Denis	Djabir Saïd-Guerni (ALG)	Yuriy Borzakovskiy (RUS)	Mbulaeni Mulaudzi (RSA)
2005 Helsinki	Rashid Ramzi (BHR)	Yuriy Borzakovskiy (RUS)	William Yiampoy (KEN)
2007 Osaka	Alfred Kirwa Yego (KEN)	Gary Reed (CAN)	Yuriy Borzakovskiy (RUS)
2009 Berlin	Mbulaeni Mulaudzi (RSA)	Alfred Kirwa Yego (KEN)	Yusuf Saad Kamel (BHR)
2011 Daegu	David Rudisha (KEN)	Abubaker Kaki (SUD)	Yuriy Borzakovskiy (RUS)
2013 Moscow	Mohammed Aman (ETH)	Nick Symmonds (USA)	Ayanleh Souleiman (DJI)
2015 Beijing	David Rudisha (KEN)	Adam Kszczot (POL)	Amel Tuka (BIH)
2017 London	Pierre-Ambroise Bosse (FRA)	Adam Kszczot (POL)	Kipyegon Bett (KEN)
2019 Doha	Donavan Brazier (USA)	Amel Tuka (BIH)	Ferguson Cheruiyot Rotich (KEN)
2022 Eugene	Emmanuel Korir (KEN)	Djamel Sedjati (ALG)	Marco Arop (CAN)
2023 Budapest	Marco Arop (CAN)	Emmanuel Wanyonyi (KEN)	Ben Pattison (GBR)
2025 Tokyo	Emmanuel Wanyonyi (KEN)	Djamel Sedjati (ALG)	Marco Arop (CAN)

==== Medalists by country ====
Rank	Nation	Gold	Silver	Bronze	Total
1	Kenya (KEN)	8	3	4	15
2	Denmark (DEN)	3	0	0	3
3	Algeria (ALG)	1	2	1	4
4	United States (USA)	1	1	2	4
4	Canada (CAN)	1	1	2	4
6	South Africa (RSA)	1	1	1	3
7	Bahrain (BHR)	1	0	1	2
8	Ethiopia (ETH)	1	0	0	1
8	Switzerland (SUI)	1	0	0	1
8	West Germany (FRG)	1	0	0	1
8	France (FRA)	1	0	0	1
12	Russia (RUS)	0	2	2	4
13	Poland (POL)	0	2	1	3
14	Brazil (BRA)	0	1	2	3
15	Bosnia and Herzegovina (BIH)	0	1	1	2
15	Great Britain (GBR)	0	1	1	2
17	Italy (ITA)	0	1	0	1
17	Netherlands (NED)	0	1	0	1
17	Sudan (SUD)	0	1	0	1
17	Burundi (BDI)	0	1	0	1
17	Cuba (CUB)	0	1	0	1
22	Djibouti (DJI)	0	0	1	1
22	Norway (NOR)	0	0	1	1

=== 1500 m ===
Championships	Gold	Silver	Bronze
1983 Helsinki	Steve Cram (GBR)	Steve Scott (USA)	Saïd Aouita (MAR)
1987 Rome	Abdi Bile (SOM)	José Luis González (ESP)	Jim Spivey (USA)
1991 Tokyo	Noureddine Morceli (ALG)	Wilfred Kirochi (KEN)	Hauke Fuhlbrügge (GER)
1993 Stuttgart	Noureddine Morceli (ALG)	Fermín Cacho (ESP)	Abdi Bile (SOM)
1995 Gothenburg	Noureddine Morceli (ALG)	Hicham El Guerrouj (MAR)	Vénuste Niyongabo (BDI)
1997 Athens	Hicham El Guerrouj (MAR)	Fermín Cacho (ESP)	Reyes Estévez (ESP)
1999 Seville	Hicham El Guerrouj (MAR)	Noah Ngeny (KEN)	Reyes Estévez (ESP)
2001 Edmonton	Hicham El Guerrouj (MAR)	Bernard Lagat (KEN)	Driss Maazouzi (FRA)
2003 Saint-Denis	Hicham El Guerrouj (MAR)	Mehdi Baala (FRA)	Ivan Heshko (UKR)
2005 Helsinki	Rashid Ramzi (BHR)	Adil Kaouch (MAR)	Rui Silva (POR)
2007 Osaka	Bernard Lagat (USA)	Rashid Ramzi (BHR)	Shedrack Kibet Korir (KEN)
2009 Berlin	Yusuf Saad Kamel (BHR)	Deresse Mekonnen (ETH)	Bernard Lagat (USA)
2011 Daegu	Asbel Kiprop (KEN)	Silas Kiplagat (KEN)	Matthew Centrowitz (USA)
2013 Moscow	Asbel Kiprop (KEN)	Matthew Centrowitz (USA)	Johan Cronje (RSA)
2015 Beijing	Asbel Kiprop (KEN)	Elijah Manangoi (KEN)	Abdalaati Iguider (MAR)
2017 London	Elijah Manangoi (KEN)	Timothy Cheruiyot (KEN)	Filip Ingebrigtsen (NOR)
2019 Doha	Timothy Cheruiyot (KEN)	Taoufik Makhloufi (ALG)	Marcin Lewandowski (POL)
2022 Eugene	Jake Wightman (GBR)	Jakob Ingebrigtsen (NOR)	Mohamed Katir (ESP)
2023 Budapest	Josh Kerr (GBR)	Jakob Ingebrigtsen (NOR)	Narve Gilje Nordås (NOR)
2025 Tokyo	Isaac Nader (POR)	Jake Wightman (GBR)	Reynold Cheruiyot (KEN)

==== Medalists by country ====
Rank	Nation	Gold	Silver	Bronze	Total
1	Kenya (KEN)	5	6	2	13
2	Morocco (MAR)	4	2	2	8
3	Algeria (ALG)	3	1	0	4
3	Great Britain (GBR)	3	1	0	4
5	Bahrain (BHR)	2	1	0	3
6	United States (USA)	1	2	3	6
7	Somalia (SOM)	1	0	1	2
7	Portugal (POR)	1	0	1	2
9	Spain (ESP)	0	3	3	6
10	Norway (NOR)	0	2	2	4
11	France (FRA)	0	1	1	2
12	Ethiopia (ETH)	0	1	0	1
13	Burundi (BDI)	0	0	1	1
13	Germany (GER)	0	0	1	1
13	Poland (POL)	0	0	1	1
13	South Africa (RSA)	0	0	1	1
13	Ukraine (UKR)	0	0	1	1

=== 5000 m ===
Championships	Gold	Silver	Bronze
1983 Helsinki	Eamonn Coghlan (IRL)	Werner Schildhauer (GDR)	Martti Vainio (FIN)
1987 Rome	Saïd Aouita (MAR)	Domingos Castro (POR)	Jack Buckner (GBR)
1991 Tokyo	Yobes Ondieki (KEN)	Fita Bayisa (ETH)	Brahim Boutayeb (MAR)
1993 Stuttgart	Ismael Kirui (KEN)	Haile Gebrselassie (ETH)	Fita Bayisa (ETH)
1995 Gothenburg	Ismael Kirui (KEN)	Khalid Boulami (MAR)	Shem Kororia (KEN)
1997 Athens	Daniel Komen (KEN)	Khalid Boulami (MAR)	Tom Nyariki (KEN)
1999 Seville	Salah Hissou (MAR)	Benjamin Limo (KEN)	Mohammed Mourhit (BEL)
2001 Edmonton	Richard Limo (KEN)	Million Wolde (ETH)	John Kibowen (KEN)
2003 Saint-Denis	Eliud Kipchoge (KEN)	Hicham El Guerrouj (MAR)	Kenenisa Bekele (ETH)
2005 Helsinki	Benjamin Limo (KEN)	Sileshi Sihine (ETH)	Craig Mottram (AUS)
2007 Osaka	Bernard Lagat (USA)	Eliud Kipchoge (KEN)	Moses Kipsiro (UGA)
2009 Berlin	Kenenisa Bekele (ETH)	Bernard Lagat (USA)	James Kwalia (QAT)
2011 Daegu	Mo Farah (GBR)	Bernard Lagat (USA)	Dejen Gebremeskel (ETH)
2013 Moscow	Mo Farah (GBR)	Hagos Gebrhiwet (ETH)	Isiah Koech (KEN)
2015 Beijing	Mo Farah (GBR)	Caleb Ndiku (KEN)	Hagos Gebrhiwet (ETH)
2017 London	Muktar Edris (ETH)	Mo Farah (GBR)	Paul Chelimo (USA)
2019 Doha	Muktar Edris (ETH)	Selemon Barega (ETH)	Mohammed Ahmed (CAN)
2022 Eugene	Jakob Ingebrigtsen (NOR)	Jacob Krop (KEN)	Oscar Chelimo (UGA)
2023 Budapest	Jakob Ingebrigtsen (NOR)	Mohamed Katir (ESP)	Jacob Krop (KEN)
2025 Tokyo	Cole Hocker (USA)	Isaac Kimeli (BEL)	Jimmy Gressier (FRA)

=== 10,000 m ===
Championships	Gold	Silver	Bronze
1983 Helsinki	Alberto Cova (ITA)	Werner Schildhauer (GDR)	Hansjörg Kunze (GDR)
1987 Rome	Paul Kipkoech (KEN)	Francesco Panetta (ITA)	Hansjörg Kunze (GDR)
1991 Tokyo	Moses Tanui (KEN)	Richard Chelimo (KEN)	Khalid Skah (MAR)
1993 Stuttgart	Haile Gebrselassie (ETH)	Moses Tanui (KEN)	Richard Chelimo (KEN)
1995 Gothenburg	Haile Gebrselassie (ETH)	Khalid Skah (MAR)	Paul Tergat (KEN)
1997 Athens	Haile Gebrselassie (ETH)	Paul Tergat (KEN)	Salah Hissou (MAR)
1999 Seville	Haile Gebrselassie (ETH)	Paul Tergat (KEN)	Assefa Mezgebu (ETH)
2001 Edmonton	Charles Kamathi (KEN)	Assefa Mezgebu (ETH)	Haile Gebrselassie (ETH)
2003 Saint-Denis	Kenenisa Bekele (ETH)	Haile Gebrselassie (ETH)	Sileshi Sihine (ETH)
2005 Helsinki	Kenenisa Bekele (ETH)	Sileshi Sihine (ETH)	Moses Mosop (KEN)
2007 Osaka	Kenenisa Bekele (ETH)	Sileshi Sihine (ETH)	Martin Mathathi (KEN)
2009 Berlin	Kenenisa Bekele (ETH)	Zersenay Tadese (ERI)	Moses Ndiema Masai (KEN)
2011 Daegu	Ibrahim Jeilan (ETH)	Mo Farah (GBR)	Imane Merga (ETH)
2013 Moscow	Mo Farah (GBR)	Ibrahim Jeilan (ETH)	Paul Tanui (KEN)
2015 Beijing	Mo Farah (GBR)	Geoffrey Kamworor (KEN)	Paul Tanui (KEN)
2017 London	Mo Farah (GBR)	Joshua Cheptegei (UGA)	Paul Tanui (KEN)
2019 Doha	Joshua Cheptegei (UGA)	Yomif Kejelcha (ETH)	Andamlak Belihu (ETH)
2022 Eugene	Joshua Cheptegei (UGA)	Stanley Mburu (KEN)	Jacob Kiplimo (UGA)
2023 Budapest	Joshua Cheptegei (UGA)	Daniel Ebenyo (KEN)	Selemon Barega (ETH)
2025 Tokyo	Jimmy Gressier (FRA)	Yomif Kejelcha (ETH)	Andreas Almgren (SWE)

=== 110 m hurdles ===
Championships	Gold	Silver	Bronze
1983 Helsinki	Greg Foster (USA)	Arto Bryggare (FIN)	Willie Gault (USA)
1987 Rome	Greg Foster (USA)	Jon Ridgeon (GBR)	Colin Jackson (GBR)
1991 Tokyo	Greg Foster (USA)	Jack Pierce (USA)	Tony Jarrett (GBR)
1993 Stuttgart	Colin Jackson (GBR)	Tony Jarrett (GBR)	Jack Pierce (USA)
1995 Gothenburg	Allen Johnson (USA)	Tony Jarrett (GBR)	Roger Kingdom (USA)
1997 Athens	Allen Johnson (USA)	Colin Jackson (GBR)	Igor Kováč (SVK)
1999 Seville	Colin Jackson (GBR)	Anier García (CUB)	Duane Ross (USA)
2001 Edmonton	Allen Johnson (USA)	Anier García (CUB)	Dudley Dorival (HAI)
2003 Saint-Denis	Allen Johnson (USA)	Terrence Trammell (USA)	Liu Xiang (CHN)
2005 Helsinki	Ladji Doucouré (FRA)	Liu Xiang (CHN)	Allen Johnson (USA)
2007 Osaka	Liu Xiang (CHN)	Terrence Trammell (USA)	David Payne (USA)
2009 Berlin	Ryan Brathwaite (BAR)	Terrence Trammell (USA)	David Payne (USA)
2011 Daegu	Jason Richardson (USA)	Liu Xiang (CHN)	Andy Turner (GBR)
2013 Moscow	David Oliver (USA)	Ryan Wilson (USA)	Sergey Shubenkov (RUS)
2015 Beijing	Sergey Shubenkov (RUS)	Hansle Parchment (JAM)	Aries Merritt (USA)
2017 London	Omar McLeod (JAM)	Sergey Shubenkov (ANA)	Balázs Baji (HUN)
2019 Doha	Grant Holloway (USA)	Sergey Shubenkov (ANA)	Pascal Martinot-Lagarde (FRA) Orlando Ortega (ESP)
2022 Eugene	Grant Holloway (USA)	Trey Cunningham (USA)	Asier Martínez (ESP)
2023 Budapest	Grant Holloway (USA)	Hansle Parchment (JAM)	Daniel Roberts (USA)
2025 Tokyo	Cordell Tinch (USA)	Orlando Bennett (JAM)	Tyler Mason (JAM)

==== Medal table ====
Rank	Nation	Gold	Silver	Bronze	Total
1	United States (USA)	13	6	9	28
2	Great Britain (GBR)	2	4	3	9
3	Jamaica (JAM)	1	3	1	5
4	China (CHN)	1	2	1	4
5	France (FRA)	1	0	1	2
5	Russia (RUS)	1	0	1	2
7	Barbados (BRB)	1	0	0	1
8	Cuba (CUB)	0	2	0	2
–	Authorised Neutral Athletes (ANA)	0	2	0	2
9	Finland (FIN)	0	1	0	1
10	Spain (ESP)	0	0	2	2
11	Haiti (HAI)	0	0	1	1
11	Hungary (HUN)	0	0	1	1
11	Slovakia (SVK)	0	0	1	1
Totals (13 entries)		20	20	21	61

=== 400 m hurdles ===
Championships	Gold	Silver	Bronze
1983 Helsinki	Edwin Moses (USA)	Harald Schmid (FRG)	Aleksandr Kharlov (URS)
1987 Rome	Edwin Moses (USA)	Danny Harris (USA)	Harald Schmid (FRG)
1991 Tokyo	Samuel Matete (ZAM)	Winthrop Graham (JAM)	Kriss Akabusi (GBR)
1993 Stuttgart	Kevin Young (USA)	Samuel Matete (ZAM)	Winthrop Graham (JAM)
1995 Gothenburg	Derrick Adkins (USA)	Samuel Matete (ZAM)	Stéphane Diagana (FRA)
1997 Athens	Stéphane Diagana (FRA)	Llewellyn Herbert (RSA)	Bryan Bronson (USA)
1999 Seville	Fabrizio Mori (ITA)	Stéphane Diagana (FRA)	Marcel Schelbert (SUI)
2001 Edmonton	Félix Sánchez (DOM)	Fabrizio Mori (ITA)	Dai Tamesue (JPN)
2003 Saint-Denis	Félix Sánchez (DOM)	Joey Woody (USA)	Periklis Iakovakis (GRE)
2005 Helsinki	Bershawn Jackson (USA)	James Carter (USA)	Dai Tamesue (JPN)
2007 Osaka	Kerron Clement (USA)	Félix Sánchez (DOM)	Marek Plawgo (POL)
2009 Berlin	Kerron Clement (USA)	Javier Culson (PUR)	Bershawn Jackson (USA)
2011 Daegu	Dai Greene (GBR)	Javier Culson (PUR)	L. J. van Zyl (RSA)
2013 Moscow	Jehue Gordon (TRI)	Michael Tinsley (USA)	Emir Bekrić (SRB)
2015 Beijing	Nicholas Bett (KEN)	Denis Kudryavtsev (RUS)	Jeffery Gibson (BAH)
2017 London	Karsten Warholm (NOR)	Yasmani Copello (TUR)	Kerron Clement (USA)
2019 Doha	Karsten Warholm (NOR)	Rai Benjamin (USA)	Abderrahman Samba (QAT)
2022 Eugene	Alison dos Santos (BRA)	Rai Benjamin (USA)	Trevor Bassitt (USA)
2023 Budapest	Karsten Warholm (NOR)	Kyron McMaster (BVI)	Rai Benjamin (USA)
2025 Tokyo	Rai Benjamin (USA)	Alison dos Santos (BRA)	Abderrahman Samba (QAT)

==== Medal table ====
Rank	Nation	Gold	Silver	Bronze	Total
1	United States (USA)	8	6	5	19
2	Norway (NOR)	3	0	0	3
3	Dominican Republic (DOM)	2	1	0	3
4	Zambia (ZAM)	1	2	0	3
5	France (FRA)	1	1	1	3
6	Brazil (BRA)	1	1	0	2
6	Italy (ITA)	1	1	0	2
8	Great Britain (GBR)	1	0	1	2
9	Kenya (KEN)	1	0	0	1
9	Trinidad and Tobago (TTO)	1	0	0	1
11	Puerto Rico (PUR)	0	2	0	2
12	Germany (GER)	0	1	1	2
12	Jamaica (JAM)	0	1	1	2
12	South Africa (RSA)	0	1	1	2
15	British Virgin Islands (BVI)	0	1	0	1
15	Russia (RUS)	0	1	0	1
15	Turkey (TUR)	0	1	0	1
18	Japan (JPN)	0	0	2	2
18	Qatar (QAT)	0	0	2	2
20	Bahamas (BAH)	0	0	1	1
20	Greece (GRE)	0	0	1	1
20	Poland (POL)	0	0	1	1
20	Serbia (SRB)	0	0	1	1
20	Soviet Union (URS)	0	0	1	1
20	Switzerland (SUI)	0	0	1	1
Totals (25 entries)		20	20	20	60

=== 3000 m steeplechase ===
Championships	Gold	Silver	Bronze
1983 Helsinki	Patriz Ilg (FRG)	Bogusław Mamiński (POL)	Colin Reitz (GBR)
1987 Rome	Francesco Panetta (ITA)	Hagen Melzer (GDR)	William Van Dijck (BEL)
1991 Tokyo	Moses Kiptanui (KEN)	Patrick Sang (KEN)	Azzedine Brahmi (ALG)
1993 Stuttgart	Moses Kiptanui (KEN)	Patrick Sang (KEN)	Alessandro Lambruschini (ITA)
1995 Gothenburg	Moses Kiptanui (KEN)	Christopher Kosgei (KEN)	Saad Al-Asmari (KSA)
1997 Athens	Wilson Boit Kipketer (KEN)	Moses Kiptanui (KEN)	Bernard Barmasai (KEN)
1999 Seville	Christopher Kosgei (KEN)	Wilson Boit Kipketer (KEN)	Ali Ezzine (MAR)
2001 Edmonton	Reuben Kosgei (KEN)	Ali Ezzine (MAR)	Bernard Barmasai (KEN)
2003 Saint-Denis	Saif Saaeed Shaheen (QAT)	Ezekiel Kemboi (KEN)	Eliseo Martín (ESP)
2005 Helsinki	Saif Saaeed Shaheen (QAT)	Ezekiel Kemboi (KEN)	Brimin Kipruto (KEN)
2007 Osaka	Brimin Kipruto (KEN)	Ezekiel Kemboi (KEN)	Richard Mateelong (KEN)
2009 Berlin	Ezekiel Kemboi (KEN)	Richard Mateelong (KEN)	Bouabdellah Tahri (FRA)
2011 Daegu	Ezekiel Kemboi (KEN)	Brimin Kipruto (KEN)	Mahiedine Mekhissi-Benabbad (FRA)
2013 Moscow	Ezekiel Kemboi (KEN)	Conseslus Kipruto (KEN)	Mahiedine Mekhissi-Benabbad (FRA)
2015 Beijing	Ezekiel Kemboi (KEN)	Conseslus Kipruto (KEN)	Brimin Kipruto (KEN)
2017 London	Conseslus Kipruto (KEN)	Soufiane El Bakkali (MAR)	Evan Jager (USA)
2019 Doha	Conseslus Kipruto (KEN)	Lamecha Girma (ETH)	Soufiane El Bakkali (MAR)
2022 Eugene	Soufiane El Bakkali (MAR)	Lamecha Girma (ETH)	Conseslus Kipruto (KEN)
2023 Budapest	Soufiane El Bakkali (MAR)	Lamecha Girma (ETH)	Abraham Kibiwott (KEN)
2025 Tokyo	Geordie Beamish (NZL)	Soufiane El Bakkali (MAR)	Edmund Serem (KEN)

==== Medal table ====
Rank	Nation	Gold	Silver	Bronze	Total
1	Kenya (KEN)	13	12	8	33
2	Morocco (MAR)	2	3	2	7
3	Qatar (QAT)	2	0	0	2
4	Italy (ITA)	1	0	1	2
5	Germany (GER)	1	0	0	1
5	New Zealand (NZL)	1	0	0	1
7	Ethiopia (ETH)	0	3	0	3
8	East Germany (GDR)	0	1	0	1
8	Poland (POL)	0	1	0	1
10	France (FRA)	0	0	3	3
11	Algeria (ALG)	0	0	1	1
11	Belgium (BEL)	0	0	1	1
11	Great Britain (GBR)	0	0	1	1
11	Saudi Arabia (KSA)	0	0	1	1
11	Spain (ESP)	0	0	1	1
11	United States (USA)	0	0	1	1
Totals (16 entries)		20	20	20	60

=== 4 × 100 metres relay ===
Championships	Gold	Silver	Bronze
1983 Helsinki	United States (USA); Emmit King; Willie Gault; Calvin Smith; Carl Lewis	Italy (ITA); Stefano Tilli; Carlo Simionato; Pierfrancesco Pavoni; Pietro Mennea	Soviet Union (URS); Andrey Prokofyev; Nikolay Sidorov; Vladimir Muravyov; Viktor Bryzhin
1987 Rome	United States (USA); Lee McRae; Lee Vernon McNeill; Harvey Glance; Carl Lewis	Soviet Union (URS); Aleksandr Yevgenyev; Viktor Bryzhin; Vladimir Muravyov; Vladimir Krylov	Jamaica (JAM); John Mair; Andrew Smith; Clive Wright; Ray Stewart
1991 Tokyo	United States (USA); Andre Cason; Leroy Burrell; Dennis Mitchell; Carl Lewis	France (FRA); Max Morinière; Daniel Sangouma; Jean-Charles Trouabal; Bruno Marie-Rose	Great Britain (GBR); Tony Jarrett; John Regis; Darren Braithwaite; Linford Christie
1993 Stuttgart	United States (USA); Jon Drummond; Andre Cason; Dennis Mitchell; Leroy Burrell; Calvin Smith*	Great Britain (GBR); Colin Jackson; Tony Jarrett; John Regis; Linford Christie; Jason John*; Darren Braithwaite*	Canada (CAN); Robert Esmie; Glenroy Gilbert; Bruny Surin; Atlee Mahorn
1995 Gothenburg	Canada (CAN); Donovan Bailey; Robert Esmie; Glenroy Gilbert; Bruny Surin	Australia (AUS); Paul Henderson; Tim Jackson; Steve Brimacombe; Damien Marsh	Italy (ITA); Giovanni Puggioni; Ezio Madonia; Angelo Cipolloni; Sandro Floris
1997 Athens	Canada (CAN); Robert Esmie; Glenroy Gilbert; Bruny Surin; Donovan Bailey; Carlton Chambers*	Nigeria (NGR); Osmond Ezinwa; Olapade Adeniken; Francis Obikwelu; Davidson Ezinwa	Great Britain (GBR); Darren Braithwaite; Darren Campbell; Douglas Walker; Julian Golding; Dwain Chambers*
1999 Seville^{[4x100m dq1]}	United States (USA); Jon Drummond; Tim Montgomery; Brian Lewis; Maurice Greene	Great Britain (GBR); Jason Gardener; Darren Campbell; Marlon Devonish; Dwain Chambers; Allyn Condon*	Brazil (BRA); Raphael de Oliveira; Claudinei da Silva; Édson Ribeiro; André Domingos
2001 Edmonton^{[4x100m dq2]}	South Africa (RSA); Morné Nagel; Corné du Plessis; Lee-Roy Newton; Matthew Quinn	Trinidad and Tobago (TRI); Marc Burns; Ato Boldon; Jacey Harper; Darrel Brown	Australia (AUS); Matt Shirvington; Paul Di Bella; Steve Brimacombe; Adam Basil
2003 Saint-Denis^{[4x100m dq3]}	United States (USA); John Capel Jr. Bernard Williams; Darvis Patton; Joshua J. Johnson	Brazil (BRA); Vicente de Lima; Édson Ribeiro; André Domingos; Cláudio Roberto Souza	Netherlands (NED); Timothy Beck; Troy Douglas; Patrick van Balkom; Caimin Douglas; Guus Hoogmoed*
2005 Helsinki	France (FRA); Ladji Doucouré; Ronald Pognon; Eddy De Lépine; Lueyi Dovy; Oudéré Kankarafou*	Trinidad and Tobago (TRI); Kevon Pierre; Marc Burns; Jacey Harper; Darrel Brown	Great Britain (GBR); Jason Gardener; Marlon Devonish; Christian Malcolm; Mark Lewis-Francis
2007 Osaka	United States (USA); Darvis Patton; Wallace Spearmon; Tyson Gay; Leroy Dixon; Rodney Martin*	Jamaica (JAM); Marvin Anderson; Usain Bolt; Nesta Carter; Asafa Powell; Dwight Thomas*; Steve Mullings*	Great Britain (GBR); Christian Malcolm; Craig Pickering; Marlon Devonish; Mark Lewis-Francis
2009 Berlin	Jamaica (JAM); Steve Mullings; Michael Frater; Usain Bolt; Asafa Powell; Dwight Thomas*; Lerone Clarke*	Trinidad and Tobago (TRI); Darrel Brown; Marc Burns; Emmanuel Callender; Richard Thompson; Keston Bledman*	Great Britain (GBR); Simeon Williamson; Tyrone Edgar; Marlon Devonish; Harry Aikines-Aryeetey
2011 Daegu	Jamaica (JAM); Nesta Carter; Michael Frater; Yohan Blake; Usain Bolt; Dexter Lee*	France (FRA); Teddy Tinmar; Christophe Lemaitre; Yannick Lesourd; Jimmy Vicaut	Saint Kitts and Nevis (SKN); Jason Rogers; Kim Collins; Antoine Adams; Brijesh Lawrence
2013 Moscow	Jamaica (JAM); Nesta Carter; Kemar Bailey-Cole; Nickel Ashmeade; Usain Bolt; Warren Weir*; Oshane Bailey*	United States (USA); Charles Silmon; Mike Rodgers; Mookie Salaam; Justin Gatlin	Canada (CAN); Gavin Smellie; Aaron Brown; Dontae Richards-Kwok; Justyn Warner
2015 Beijing	Jamaica (JAM); Nesta Carter; Asafa Powell; Nickel Ashmeade; Usain Bolt; Rasheed Dwyer*	China (CHN); Mo Youxue; Xie Zhenye; Su Bingtian; Zhang Peimeng	Canada (CAN); Aaron Brown; Andre De Grasse; Brendon Rodney; Justyn Warner
2017 London	Great Britain (GBR); Chijindu Ujah; Adam Gemili; Danny Talbot; Nethaneel Mitchell-Blake	United States (USA); Mike Rodgers; Justin Gatlin; Jaylen Bacon; Christian Coleman; BeeJay Lee*	Japan (JPN); Shuhei Tada; Shōta Iizuka; Yoshihide Kiryū; Kenji Fujimitsu; Asuka Cambridge*
2019 Doha	United States (USA); Christian Coleman; Justin Gatlin; Mike Rodgers; Noah Lyles; Cravon Gillespie*	Great Britain (GBR); Adam Gemili; Zharnel Hughes; Richard Kilty; Nethaneel Mitchell-Blake	Japan (JPN); Shuhei Tada; Kirara Shiraishi; Yoshihide Kiryū; Abdul Hakim Sani Brown; Yuki Koike*
2022 Eugene	Canada (CAN); Aaron Brown; Jerome Blake; Brendon Rodney; Andre De Grasse	United States (USA); Christian Coleman; Noah Lyles; Elijah Hall; Marvin Bracy	Great Britain (GBR); Jona Efoloko; Zharnel Hughes; Nethaneel Mitchell-Blake; Reece Prescod; Adam Gemili*
2023 Budapest	United States (USA); Christian Coleman; Fred Kerley; Brandon Carnes; Noah Lyles; JT Smith *	Italy (ITA); Roberto Rigali; Lamont Marcell Jacobs; Lorenzo Patta; Filippo Tortu	Jamaica (JAM); Ackeem Blake; Oblique Seville; Ryiem Forde; Rohan Watson
2025 Tokyo	United States (USA); Christian Coleman; Kenneth Bednarek; Courtney Lindsey; Noah Lyles; Ronnie Baker*; Trayvon Bromell*; T'Mars McCallum*	Canada (CAN); Aaron Brown; Jerome Blake; Brendon Rodney; Andre De Grasse	Netherlands (NED); Nsikak Ekpo; Taymir Burnet; Xavi Mo-Ajok; Elvis Afrifa

Note * Indicates athletes who ran only in the preliminary round and also received medals.

- ^{4x100m dq1} The Nigerian team of Innocent Asonze, Francis Obikwelu, Daniel Effiong and Deji Aliu originally finished third in the 1999 World Championship, but were disqualified after Asonze was found to have used performance-enhancing drugs.
- ^{4x100m dq2} The United States team of Mickey Grimes, Bernard Williams, Dennis Mitchell and Tim Montgomery originally won the 2001 World Championship in a time of 37.96 seconds, but were disqualified after Montgomery admitted to drug use as a result of the BALCO scandal in 2005.
- ^{4x100m dq3} The British team of Christian Malcolm, Darren Campbell, Marlon Devonish and Dwain Chambers originally finished second in the 2003 World Championship, but were disqualified after Chambers was found to have used performance-enhancing drugs.

==== Medals by country ====
Rank	Nation	Gold	Silver	Bronze	Total
1	United States (USA)	10	3	0	13
2	Jamaica (JAM)	4	1	2	7
3	Canada (CAN)	3	1	3	7
4	Great Britain (GBR)	1	3	6	10
5	France (FRA)	1	2	0	3
6	South Africa (RSA)	1	0	0	1
7	Trinidad and Tobago (TTO)	0	3	0	3
8	Italy (ITA)	0	2	1	3
9	Australia (AUS)	0	1	1	2
9	Brazil (BRA)	0	1	1	2
9	Soviet Union (URS)	0	1	1	2
12	Nigeria (NGR)	0	1	0	1
12	China (CHN)	0	1	0	1
14	Japan (JPN)	0	0	2	2
15	Netherlands (NED)	0	0	2	2
16	Saint Kitts and Nevis (SKN)	0	0	1	1

=== 4 × 400 metres relay ===
Championships	Gold	Silver	Bronze
1983 Helsinki	Soviet Union (URS); Sergey Lovachov; Aliaksandr Trashchyla; Nikolay Chernetskiy; Viktor Markin	West Germany (FRG); Erwin Skamrahl; Jörg Vaihinger; Harald Schmid; Hartmut Weber; Martin Weppler*; Edgar Nakladal*	Great Britain (GBR); Ainsley Bennett; Garry Cook; Todd Bennett; Phil Brown; Kriss Akabusi*
1987 Rome	United States (USA); Danny Everett; Roddie Haley; Antonio McKay; Butch Reynolds; Michael Franks*; Raymond Pierre*	Great Britain (GBR); Derek Redmond; Kriss Akabusi; Roger Black; Phil Brown; Todd Bennett*; Mark Thomas*	Cuba (CUB); Leandro Peñalver; Agustín Pavó; Lázaro Martínez; Roberto Hernández
1991 Tokyo	Great Britain (GBR); Roger Black; Derek Redmond; John Regis; Kriss Akabusi; Ade Mafe*; Mark Richardson*	United States (USA); Andrew Valmon; Quincy Watts; Danny Everett; Antonio Pettigrew; Jeff Reynolds*; Mark Everett*	Jamaica (JAM); Patrick O'Connor; Devon Morris; Winthrop Graham; Seymour Fagan; Howard Burnett*
1993 Stuttgart	United States (USA); Andrew Valmon; Quincy Watts; Butch Reynolds; Michael Johnson; Antonio Pettigrew*; Derek Mills*	Kenya (KEN); Kennedy Ochieng; Simon Kemboi; Abednego Matilu; Samson Kitur	Germany (GER); Rico Lieder; Karsten Just; Olaf Hense; Thomas Schönlebe
1995 Gothenburg	United States (USA); Marlon Ramsey; Derek Mills; Butch Reynolds; Michael Johnson; Kevin Lyles*; Darnell Hall*	Jamaica (JAM); Michael McDonald; Davian Clarke; Danny McFarlane; Greg Haughton; Dennis Blake*	Nigeria (NGR); Udeme Ekpeyong; Kunle Adejuyigbe; Jude Monye; Sunday Bada
1997 Athens^{dq1}	Great Britain (GBR); Iwan Thomas; Roger Black; Jamie Baulch; Mark Richardson; Mark Hylton*	Jamaica (JAM); Michael McDonald; Greg Haughton; Danny McFarlane; Davian Clarke; Linval Laird*	Poland (POL); Tomasz Czubak; Piotr Rysiukiewicz; Piotr Haczek; Robert Maćkowiak
1999 Seville^{dq2}	Poland (POL); Tomasz Czubak; Robert Maćkowiak; Jacek Bocian; Piotr Haczek; Piotr Długosielski*	Jamaica (JAM); Michael McDonald; Greg Haughton; Danny McFarlane; Davian Clarke; Paston Coke*; Omar A. Brown*	South Africa (RSA); Jopie van Oudtshoorn; Hendrick Mokganyetsi; Adriaan Botha; Arnaud Malherbe
2001 Edmonton^{dq3}	Bahamas (BAH); Avard Moncur; Chris Brown; Troy McIntosh; Timothy Munnings; Carl Oliver*	Jamaica (JAM); Brandon Simpson; Christopher Williams; Greg Haughton; Danny McFarlane; Michael Blackwood*; Mario Watts*	Poland (POL); Rafał Wieruszewski; Piotr Haczek; Piotr Długosielski; Piotr Rysiukiewicz; Jacek Bocian*
2003 Saint-Denis^{dq4}	France (FRA); Leslie Djhone; Naman Keïta; Stéphane Diagana; Marc Raquil; Ahmed Douhou*	Jamaica (JAM); Brandon Simpson; Danny McFarlane; Davian Clarke; Michael Blackwood; Michael Campbell*; Lansford Spence*	Bahamas (BAH); Avard Moncur; Dennis Darling; Nathaniel McKinney; Chris Brown; Carl Oliver*
2005 Helsinki	United States (USA); Andrew Rock; Derrick Brew; Darold Williamson; Jeremy Wariner; Miles Smith*; LaShawn Merritt*	Bahamas (BAH); Nathaniel McKinney; Avard Moncur; Andrae Williams; Chris Brown; Troy McIntosh*	Jamaica (JAM); Sanjay Ayre; Brandon Simpson; Lansford Spence; Davian Clarke; Michael Blackwood*
2007 Osaka	United States (USA); LaShawn Merritt; Angelo Taylor; Darold Williamson; Jeremy Wariner; Bershawn Jackson*; Kerron Clement*	Bahamas (BAH); Avard Moncur; Michael Mathieu; Andrae Williams; Chris Brown; Nathaniel McKinney*	Poland (POL); Marek Plawgo; Daniel Dąbrowski; Marcin Marciniszyn; Kacper Kozłowski; Rafał Wieruszewski*; Witold Bańka*
2009 Berlin	United States (USA); Angelo Taylor; Jeremy Wariner; Kerron Clement; LaShawn Merritt; Lionel Larry*; Bershawn Jackson*	Great Britain (GBR); Conrad Williams; Michael Bingham; Robert Tobin; Martyn Rooney; Dai Greene*	Australia (AUS); John Steffensen; Ben Offereins; Tristan Thomas; Sean Wroe; Joel Milburn*
2011 Daegu	United States (USA); Greg Nixon; Bershawn Jackson; Angelo Taylor; LaShawn Merritt; Jamaal Torrance*; Michael Berry*	South Africa (RSA); Shane Victor; Ofentse Mogawane; Willem de Beer; L. J. van Zyl; Oscar Pistorius*	Jamaica (JAM); Allodin Fothergill; Jermaine Gonzales; Riker Hylton; Leford Green; Lansford Spence*
2013 Moscow^{dq5}	United States (USA); David Verburg; Tony McQuay; Arman Hall; LaShawn Merritt; James Harris*; Joshua Mance*	Jamaica (JAM); Rusheen McDonald; Edino Steele; Omar Johnson; Javon Francis; Javere Bell*	Great Britain (GBR); Conrad Williams; Martyn Rooney; Michael Bingham; Nigel Levine; Jamie Bowie*
2015 Beijing	United States (USA); David Verburg; Tony McQuay; Bryshon Nellum; LaShawn Merritt; Kyle Clemons*; Vernon Norwood*	Trinidad and Tobago (TRI); Renny Quow; Lalonde Gordon; Deon Lendore; Machel Cedenio; Jarrin Solomon*	Great Britain (GBR); Rabah Yousif; Delano Williams; Jarryd Dunn; Martyn Rooney
2017 London	Trinidad and Tobago (TRI); Jarrin Solomon; Jereem Richards; Machel Cedenio; Lalonde Gordon; Renny Quow*	United States (USA); Wil London; Gil Roberts; Michael Cherry; Fred Kerley; Bryshon Nellum*; Tony McQuay*	Great Britain (GBR); Matthew Hudson-Smith; Rabah Yousif; Dwayne Cowan; Martyn Rooney; Jack Green*
2019 Doha	United States (USA); Fred Kerley; Michael Cherry; Wil London; Rai Benjamin; Tyrell Richard*; Vernon Norwood*; Nathan Strother*	Jamaica (JAM); Akeem Bloomfield; Nathon Allen; Terry Thomas; Demish Gaye; Javon Francis*	Belgium (BEL); Jonathan Sacoor; Robin Vanderbemden; Dylan Borlée; Kevin Borlée; Julien Watrin*
2022 Eugene	United States (USA); Elija Godwin; Michael Norman; Bryce Deadmon; Champion Allison; Trevor Bassitt*; Vernon Norwood*	Jamaica (JAM); Akeem Bloomfield; Nathon Allen; Jevaughn Powell; Christopher Taylor; Karayme Bartley*; Anthony Cox*	Belgium (BEL); Dylan Borlée; Julien Watrin; Alexander Doom; Kevin Borlée; Jonathan Sacoor*
2023 Budapest	United States (USA); Quincy Hall; Vernon Norwood; Justin Robinson; Rai Benjamin; Trevor Bassitt*; Matthew Boling*; Christopher Bailey*	France (FRA); Ludvy Vaillant; Gilles Biron; David Sombé; Téo Andant; Loïc Prévot*	Great Britain (GBR); Alex Haydock-Wilson; Charlie Dobson; Lewis Davey; Rio Mitcham
2025 Tokyo	Botswana (BOT); Lee Bhekempilo Eppie; Letsile Tebogo; Bayapo Ndori; Busang Collen Kebinatshipi; Leungo Scotch*	United States (USA); Vernon Norwood; Jacory Patterson; Khaleb McRae; Rai Benjamin; Christopher Bailey*; Demarius Smith*; Bryce Deadmon*; Jenoah McKiver*	South Africa (RSA); Lythe Pillay; Udeme Okon; Wayde van Niekerk; Zakithi Nene; Gardeo Isaacs*; Leendert Koekemoer*

Note: * Indicates athletes who ran only in the preliminary round and also received medals.

- ^{dq1} The United States team (Jerome Young, Antonio Pettigrew, Chris Jones and Tyree Washington) originally won the 1997 World Championships in a time of 2:56.47 minutes, but was disqualified in 2009 after Pettigrew admitted to doping during the period.
- ^{dq2} The United States team (Jerome Davis, Antonio Pettigrew, Angelo Taylor and Michael Johnson) originally won the 1999 World Championships, but was disqualified in 2009 after Pettigrew admitted to doping during the period.
- ^{dq3} The United States team (Leonard Byrd, Antonio Pettigrew, Derrick Brew and Angelo Taylor) originally won the 2001 World Championships, but was disqualified in 2009 after Pettigrew admitted to doping during the period.
- ^{dq4} The United States team (Calvin Harrison, Tyree Washington, Derrick Brew and Jerome Young) originally won the 2003 World Championships, but was disqualified in 2004 after Harrison and Young were found to have used performance-enhancing drugs.
- ^{dq5} The Russian team (Maksim Dyldin, Lev Mosin, Sergey Petukhov and Vladimir Krasnov) originally finished third in the 2013 World Championships, but was disqualified after Dyldin was found to have used performance-enhancing drugs.

==== Medalists by country ====
Rank	Nation	Gold	Silver	Bronze	Total
1	United States (USA)	12	3	0	15
2	Great Britain (GBR)	2	2	5	9
3	Bahamas (BAH)	1	2	1	4
4	France (FRA)	1	1	0	2
4	Trinidad and Tobago (TRI)	1	1	0	2
6	Poland (POL)	1	0	3	4
7	Soviet Union (URS)	1	0	0	1
7	Botswana (BOT)	1	0	0	1
9	Jamaica (JAM)	0	8	3	11
10	South Africa (RSA)	0	1	2	3
11	Germany (GER)	0	1	1	2
12	Belgium (BEL)	0	0	2	2
13	Australia (AUS)	0	0	1	1

=== 4 × 400 metres mixed relay ===
Championships	Gold	Silver	Bronze
2019 Doha	United States (USA); Wilbert London; Allyson Felix; Courtney Okolo; Michael Cherry; Tyrell Richard*; Jessica Beard*; Jasmine Blocker*; Obi Igbokwe*	Jamaica (JAM); Nathon Allen; Roneisha McGregor; Tiffany James; Javon Francis; Janieve Russell*	Bahrain (BHR); Musa Isah; Aminat Jamal; Salwa Eid Naser; Abbas Abubakar Abbas
2022 Eugene	Dominican Republic (DOM); Fiordaliza Cofil; Lidio Andrés Feliz; Alexander Ogando; Marileidy Paulino	Netherlands (NED); Femke Bol; Liemarvin Bonevacia; Tony van Diepen; Lieke Klaver; Eveline Saalberg*	United States (USA); Allyson Felix; Elija Godwin; Vernon Norwood; Kennedy Simon; Wadeline Jonathas*
2023 Budapest	United States (USA); Justin Robinson; Rosey Effiong; Matthew Boling; Alexis Holmes; Ryan Willie*	Great Britain (GBR); Lewis Davey; Laviai Nielsen; Rio Mitcham; Yemi Mary John; Joseph Brier*	Czech Republic (CZE); Matěj Krsek; Tereza Petržilková; Patrik Šorm; Lada Vondrová
2025 Tokyo	United States (USA); Bryce Deadmon; Lynna Irby-Jackson; Jenoah McKiver; Alexis Holmes	Netherlands (NED); Eugene Omalla; Lieke Klaver; Jonas Phijffers; Femke Bol; Eveline Saalberg*	Belgium (BEL); Dylan Borlée; Imke Vervaet; Alexander Doom; Helena Ponette; Jonathan Sacoor*

Note: * Indicates athletes who ran only in the preliminary round and also received medals.

== Road ==
=== Marathon ===
Championships	Gold	Silver	Bronze
1983 Helsinki	Robert de Castella (AUS)	Kebede Balcha (ETH)	Waldemar Cierpinski (GDR)
1987 Rome	Douglas Wakiihuri (KEN)	Hussein Ahmed Salah (DJI)	Gelindo Bordin (ITA)
1991 Tokyo	Hiromi Taniguchi (JPN)	Hussein Ahmed Salah (DJI)	Steve Spence (USA)
1993 Stuttgart	Mark Plaatjes (USA)	Luketz Swartbooi (NAM)	Bert van Vlaanderen (NED)
1995 Gothenburg	Martín Fiz (ESP)	Dionicio Cerón (MEX)	Luíz Antônio dos Santos (BRA)
1997 Athens	Abel Antón (ESP)	Martín Fiz (ESP)	Steve Moneghetti (AUS)
1999 Seville	Abel Antón (ESP)	Vincenzo Modica (ITA)	Nobuyuki Sato (JPN)
2001 Edmonton	Gezahegne Abera (ETH)	Simon Biwott (KEN)	Stefano Baldini (ITA)
2003 Saint-Denis	Jaouad Gharib (MAR)	Julio Rey (ESP)	Stefano Baldini (ITA)
2005 Helsinki	Jaouad Gharib (MAR)	Christopher Isengwe (TAN)	Tsuyoshi Ogata (JPN)
2007 Osaka	Luke Kibet Bowen (KEN)	Mubarak Hassan Shami (QAT)	Viktor Röthlin (SUI)
2009 Berlin	Abel Kirui (KEN)	Emmanuel Kipchirchir Mutai (KEN)	Tsegaye Kebede (ETH)
2011 Daegu	Abel Kirui (KEN)	Vincent Kipruto (KEN)	Feyisa Lilesa (ETH)
2013 Moscow	Stephen Kiprotich (UGA)	Lelisa Desisa (ETH)	Tadese Tola (ETH)
2015 Beijing	Ghirmay Ghebreslassie (ERI)	Yemane Tsegay (ETH)	Solomon Mutai (UGA)
2017 London	Geoffrey Kirui (KEN)	Tamirat Tola (ETH)	Alphonce Simbu (TAN)
2019 Doha	Lelisa Desisa (ETH)	Mosinet Geremew (ETH)	Amos Kipruto (KEN)
2022 Eugene	Tamirat Tola (ETH)	Mosinet Geremew (ETH)	Bashir Abdi (BEL)
2023 Budapest	Victor Kiplangat (UGA)	Maru Teferi (ISR)	Leul Gebresilase (ETH)
2025 Tokyo	Alphonce Simbu (TAN)	Amanal Petros (GER)	Iliass Aouani (ITA)

=== 20 km walk ===
Championships	Gold	Silver	Bronze
1983 Helsinki	Ernesto Canto (MEX)	Jozef Pribilinec (TCH)	Yevgeniy Yevsyukov (URS)
1987 Rome	Maurizio Damilano (ITA)	Jozef Pribilinec (TCH)	Josep Marín (ESP)
1991 Tokyo	Maurizio Damilano (ITA)	Mikhail Shchennikov (URS)	Yevgeniy Misyulya (URS)
1993 Stuttgart	Valentí Massana (ESP)	Giovanni De Benedictis (ITA)	Daniel Plaza (ESP)
1995 Gothenburg	Michele Didoni (ITA)	Valentí Massana (ESP)	Yevgeniy Misyulya (BLR)
1997 Athens	Daniel García (MEX)	Mikhail Shchennikov (RUS)	Mikhail Khmelnitskiy (BLR)
1999 Seville	Ilya Markov (RUS)	Jefferson Pérez (ECU)	Daniel García (MEX)
2001 Edmonton	Roman Rasskazov (RUS)	Ilya Markov (RUS)	Viktor Burayev (RUS)
2003 Saint-Denis	Jefferson Pérez (ECU)	Paquillo Fernández (ESP)	Roman Rasskazov (RUS)
2005 Helsinki	Jefferson Pérez (ECU)	Paquillo Fernández (ESP)	Juan Manuel Molina (ESP)
2007 Osaka	Jefferson Pérez (ECU)	Paquillo Fernández (ESP)	Hatem Ghoula (TUN)
2009 Berlin	Valeriy Borchin (RUS)	Wang Hao (CHN)	Eder Sánchez (MEX)
2011 Daegu	Luis Fernando López (COL)	Wang Zhen (CHN)	Kim Hyun-sub (KOR)
2013 Moscow	Aleksandr Ivanov (RUS)	Chen Ding (CHN)	Miguel Ángel López (ESP)
2015 Beijing	Miguel Ángel López (ESP)	Wang Zhen (CHN)	Benjamin Thorne (CAN)
2017 London	Éider Arévalo (COL)	Sergey Shirobokov (ANA)	Caio Bonfim (BRA)
2019 Doha	Toshikazu Yamanishi (JPN)	Vasiliy Mizinov (ANA)	Perseus Karlström (SWE)
2022 Eugene	Toshikazu Yamanishi (JPN)	Koki Ikeda (JPN)	Perseus Karlström (SWE)
2023 Budapest	Álvaro Martín (ESP)	Perseus Karlström (SWE)	Caio Bonfim (BRA)
2025 Tokyo	Caio Bonfim (BRA)	Wang Zhaozhao (CHN)	Paul McGrath (ESP)

=== 35 km walk ===
Championships	Gold	Silver	Bronze
2022 Eugene	Massimo Stano (ITA)	Masatora Kawano (JPN)	Perseus Karlström (SWE)
2023 Budapest	Álvaro Martín (ESP)	Brian Pintado (ECU)	Masatora Kawano (JPN)
2025 Tokyo	Evan Dunfee (CAN)	Caio Bonfim (BRA)	Hayato Katsuki (JPN)

=== 50 km walk ===
Championships	Gold	Silver	Bronze
1976 Malmö	Veniamin Soldatenko (URS)	Enrique Vera (MEX)	Reima Salonen (FIN)
1983 Helsinki	Ronald Weigel (GDR)	José Marín (ESP)	Sergey Yung (URS)
1987 Rome	Hartwig Gauder (GDR)	Ronald Weigel (GDR)	Vyacheslav Ivanenko (URS)
1991 Tokyo	Aleksandr Potashov (URS)	Andrey Perlov (URS)	Hartwig Gauder (GER)
1993 Stuttgart	Jesús Ángel García (ESP)	Valentin Kononen (FIN)	Valeriy Spitsyn (RUS)
1995 Gothenburg	Valentin Kononen (FIN)	Giovanni Perricelli (ITA)	Robert Korzeniowski (POL)
1997 Athens	Robert Korzeniowski (POL)	Jesús Ángel García (ESP)	Miguel Rodríguez (MEX)
1999 Seville	Ivano Brugnetti (ITA)	Nikolay Matyukhin (RUS)	Curt Clausen (USA)
2001 Edmonton	Robert Korzeniowski (POL)	Jesús Ángel García (ESP)	Edgar Hernández (MEX)
2003 Saint-Denis	Robert Korzeniowski (POL)	German Skurygin (RUS)	Andreas Erm (GER)
2005 Helsinki	Sergey Kirdyapkin (RUS)	Aleksey Voyevodin (RUS)	Alex Schwazer (ITA)
2007 Osaka	Nathan Deakes (AUS)	Yohann Diniz (FRA)	Alex Schwazer (ITA)
2009 Berlin	Trond Nymark (NOR)	Jesús Ángel García (ESP)	Grzegorz Sudoł (POL)
2011 Daegu	Sergey Bakulin (RUS)	Denis Nizhegorodov (RUS)	Jared Tallent (AUS)
2013 Moscow	Robert Heffernan (IRL)	Mikhail Ryzhov (RUS)	Jared Tallent (AUS)
2015 Beijing	Matej Tóth (SVK)	Jared Tallent (AUS)	Takayuki Tanii (JPN)
2017 London	Yohann Diniz (FRA)	Hirooki Arai (JPN)	Kai Kobayashi (JPN)
2019 Doha	Yusuke Suzuki (JPN)	João Vieira (POR)	Evan Dunfee (CAN)

== Field ==
=== High jump ===
Championships	Gold	Silver	Bronze
1983 Helsinki	Hennadiy Avdyeyenko (URS)	Tyke Peacock (USA)	Zhu Jianhua (CHN)
1987 Rome	Patrik Sjöberg (SWE)	Hennadiy Avdyeyenko (URS) Igor Paklin (URS)	none awarded
1991 Tokyo	Charles Austin (USA)	Javier Sotomayor (CUB)	Hollis Conway (USA)
1993 Stuttgart	Javier Sotomayor (CUB)	Artur Partyka (POL)	Steve Smith (GBR)
1995 Gothenburg	Troy Kemp (BAH)	Javier Sotomayor (CUB)	Artur Partyka (POL)
1997 Athens	Javier Sotomayor (CUB)	Artur Partyka (POL)	Tim Forsyth (AUS)
1999 Seville	Vyacheslav Voronin (RUS)	Mark Boswell (CAN)	Martin Buß (GER)
2001 Edmonton	Martin Buß (GER)	Yaroslav Rybakov (RUS) Vyacheslav Voronin (RUS)	none awarded
2003 Saint-Denis	Jacques Freitag (RSA)	Stefan Holm (SWE)	Mark Boswell (CAN)
2005 Helsinki	Yuriy Krymarenko (UKR)	Víctor Moya (CUB) Yaroslav Rybakov (RUS)	none awarded
2007 Osaka	Donald Thomas (BAH)	Yaroslav Rybakov (RUS)	Kyriakos Ioannou (CYP)
2009 Berlin	Yaroslav Rybakov (RUS)	Kyriakos Ioannou (CYP)	Sylwester Bednarek (POL) Raúl Spank (GER)
2011 Daegu	Jesse Williams (USA)	Aleksey Dmitrik (RUS)	Trevor Barry (BAH)
2013 Moscow	Bohdan Bondarenko (UKR)	Mutaz Essa Barshim (QAT)	Derek Drouin (CAN)
2015 Beijing	Derek Drouin (CAN)	Bohdan Bondarenko (UKR) Zhang Guowei (CHN)	none awarded
2017 London	Mutaz Essa Barshim (QAT)	Danil Lysenko (ANA)	Majdeddin Ghazal (SYR)
2019 Doha	Mutaz Essa Barshim (QAT)	Mikhail Akimenko (ANA)	Ilya Ivanyuk (ANA)
2022 Eugene	Mutaz Essa Barshim (QAT)	Woo Sang-hyeok (KOR)	Andriy Protsenko (UKR)
2023 Budapest	Gianmarco Tamberi (ITA)	JuVaughn Harrison (USA)	Mutaz Essa Barshim (QAT)
2025 Tokyo	Hamish Kerr (NZL)	Woo Sang-hyeok (KOR)	Jan Štefela (CZE)

==== Medal table ====
Rank	Nation	Gold	Silver	Bronze	Total
1	Qatar (QAT)	3	1	1	5
2	Russia (RUS)	2	5	0	7
3	Cuba (CUB)	2	3	0	5
4	United States (USA)	2	2	1	5
5	Ukraine (UKR)	2	1	1	4
6	Bahamas (BAH)	2	0	1	3
7	Soviet Union (URS)	1	2	0	3
8	Canada (CAN)	1	1	2	4
9	Sweden (SWE)	1	1	0	2
10	Germany (GER)	1	0	2	3
11	Italy (ITA)	1	0	0	1
11	New Zealand (NZL)	1	0	0	1
11	South Africa (RSA)	1	0	0	1
14	Poland (POL)	0	2	2	4
–	Authorised Neutral Athletes (ANA)	0	2	1	3
15	South Korea (KOR)	0	2	0	2
16	China (CHN)	0	1	1	2
16	Cyprus (CYP)	0	1	1	2
18	Australia (AUS)	0	0	1	1
18	Czech Republic (CZE)	0	0	1	1
18	Great Britain (GBR)	0	0	1	1
18	Syria (SYR)	0	0	1	1
Totals (21 entries)		20	24	17	61

=== Pole vault ===
Championships	Gold	Silver	Bronze
1983 Helsinki	Sergey Bubka (URS)	Konstantin Volkov (URS)	Atanas Tarev (BUL)
1987 Rome	Sergey Bubka (URS)	Thierry Vigneron (FRA)	Radion Gataullin (URS)
1991 Tokyo	Sergey Bubka (URS)	István Bagyula (HUN)	Maksim Tarasov (URS)
1993 Stuttgart	Sergey Bubka (UKR)	Grigoriy Yegorov (KAZ)	Maksim Tarasov (RUS) Igor Trandenkov (RUS)
1995 Gothenburg	Sergey Bubka (UKR)	Maksim Tarasov (RUS)	Jean Galfione (FRA)
1997 Athens	Sergey Bubka (UKR)	Maksim Tarasov (RUS)	Dean Starkey (USA)
1999 Seville	Maksim Tarasov (RUS)	Dmitri Markov (AUS)	Aleksandr Averbukh (ISR)
2001 Edmonton	Dmitri Markov (AUS)	Aleksandr Averbukh (ISR)	Nick Hysong (USA)
2003 Saint-Denis	Giuseppe Gibilisco (ITA)	Okkert Brits (RSA)	Patrik Kristiansson (SWE)
2005 Helsinki	Rens Blom (NED)	Brad Walker (USA)	Pavel Gerasimov (RUS)
2007 Osaka	Brad Walker (USA)	Romain Mesnil (FRA)	Danny Ecker (GER)
2009 Berlin	Steve Hooker (AUS)	Romain Mesnil (FRA)	Renaud Lavillenie (FRA)
2011 Daegu	Paweł Wojciechowski (POL)	Lázaro Borges (CUB)	Renaud Lavillenie (FRA)
2013 Moscow	Raphael Holzdeppe (GER)	Renaud Lavillenie (FRA)	Björn Otto (GER)
2015 Beijing	Shawnacy Barber (CAN)	Raphael Holzdeppe (GER)	Renaud Lavillenie (FRA) Pawel Wojciechowski (POL) Piotr Lisek (POL)
2017 London	Sam Kendricks (USA)	Piotr Lisek (POL)	Renaud Lavillenie (FRA)
2019 Doha	Sam Kendricks (USA)	Armand Duplantis (SWE)	Piotr Lisek (POL)
2022 Eugene	Armand Duplantis (SWE)	Christopher Nilsen (USA)	Ernest John Obiena (PHL)
2023 Budapest	Armand Duplantis (SWE)	Ernest John Obiena (PHL)	Kurtis Marschall (AUS) Christopher Nilsen (USA)
2025 Tokyo	Armand Duplantis (SWE)	Emmanouil Karalis (GRE)	Kurtis Marschall (AUS)

=== Long jump ===
Championships	Gold		Silver		Bronze	
1983 Helsinki	Carl Lewis; United States	8.55 m	Jason Grimes; United States	8.29 m	Mike Conley; United States	8.12 m
1987 Rome	Carl Lewis; United States	8.67 m	Robert Emmiyan; Soviet Union	8.53 m	Larry Myricks; United States	8.33 m
1991 Tokyo	Mike Powell; United States	8.95 m	Carl Lewis; United States	8.91 m	Larry Myricks; United States	8.42 m
1993 Stuttgart	Mike Powell; United States	8.59 m	Stanislav Tarasenko; Russia	8.16 m	Vitaliy Kyrylenko; Ukraine	8.15 m
1995 Gothenburg	Iván Pedroso; Cuba	8.70 m	James Beckford; Jamaica	8.30 m	Mike Powell; United States	8.29 m
1997 Athens	Iván Pedroso; Cuba	8.42 m	Erick Walder; United States	8.38 m	Kirill Sosunov; Russia	8.18 m
1999 Seville	Iván Pedroso; Cuba	8.56 m	Yago Lamela; Spain	8.40 m	Gregor Cankar; Slovenia	8.36 m
2001 Edmonton	Iván Pedroso; Cuba	8.40 m	Savanté Stringfellow; United States	8.24 m	Carlos Calado; Portugal	8.21 m
2003 Saint-Denis	Dwight Phillips; United States	8.32 m	James Beckford; Jamaica	8.28 m	Yago Lamela; Spain	8.22 m
2005 Helsinki	Dwight Phillips; United States	8.60 m	Ignisious Gaisah; Ghana	8.34 m	Tommi Evilä; Finland	8.25 m
2007 Osaka	Irving Saladino; Panama	8.57 m	Andrew Howe; Italy	8.47 m	Dwight Phillips; United States	8.30 m
2009 Berlin	Dwight Phillips; United States	8.54 m	Godfrey Khotso Mokoena; South Africa	8.47 m	Mitchell Watt; Australia	8.37 m
2011 Daegu	Dwight Phillips; United States	8.45 m	Mitchell Watt; Australia	8.33 m	Ngonidzashe Makusha; Zimbabwe	8.29 m
2013 Moscow	Aleksandr Menkov; Russia	8.56 m	Ignisious Gaisah; Netherlands	8.29 m	Luis Rivera; Mexico	8.27 m
2015 Beijing	Greg Rutherford; Great Britain	8.41 m	Fabrice Lapierre; Australia	8.24 m	Wang Jianan; China	8.18 m
2017 London	Luvo Manyonga; South Africa	8.48 m	Jarrion Lawson; United States	8.44 m	Ruswahl Samaai; South Africa	8.32 m
2019 Doha	Tajay Gayle; Jamaica	8.69 m	Jeff Henderson; United States	8.39 m	Juan Miguel Echevarría; Cuba	8.34 m
2022 Eugene	Wang Jianan; China	8.36 m	Miltiadis Tentoglou; Greece	8.32 m	Simon Ehammer; Switzerland	8.16 m
2023 Budapest	Miltiadis Tentoglou; Greece	8.52 m	Wayne Pinnock; Jamaica	8.50 m	Tajay Gayle; Jamaica	8.27 m
2025 Tokyo	Mattia Furlani; Italy	8.39 m	Tajay Gayle; Jamaica	8.34 m	Shi Yuhao; China	8.33 m

==== Medal table ====
Rank	Nation	Gold	Silver	Bronze	Total
1	United States (USA)	8	6	5	19
2	Cuba (CUB)	4	0	1	5
3	Jamaica (JAM)	1	4	1	6
4	Russia (RUS)	1	1	1	3
4	South Africa (RSA)	1	1	1	3
6	Greece (GRE)	1	1	0	2
6	Italy (ITA)	1	1	0	2
8	China (CHN)	1	0	2	3
9	Great Britain (GBR)	1	0	0	1
9	Panama (PAN)	1	0	0	1
11	Australia (AUS)	0	2	1	3
12	Spain (ESP)	0	1	1	2
13	Ghana (GHA)	0	1	0	1
13	Netherlands (NED)	0	1	0	1
13	Soviet Union (URS)	0	1	0	1
16	Finland (FIN)	0	0	1	1
16	Mexico (MEX)	0	0	1	1
16	Portugal (POR)	0	0	1	1
16	Slovenia (SLO)	0	0	1	1
16	Switzerland (SUI)	0	0	1	1
16	Ukraine (UKR)	0	0	1	1
16	Zimbabwe (ZIM)	0	0	1	1
Totals (22 entries)		20	20	20	60

=== Triple jump ===
Championships	Gold	Silver	Bronze
1983 Helsinki	Zdzisław Hoffmann (POL)	Willie Banks (USA)	Ajayi Agbebaku (NGR)
1987 Rome	Khristo Markov (BUL)	Mike Conley (USA)	Oleg Sakirkin (URS)
1991 Tokyo	Kenny Harrison (USA)	Leonid Voloshin (URS)	Mike Conley (USA)
1993 Stuttgart	Mike Conley (USA)	Leonid Voloshin (RUS)	Jonathan Edwards (GBR)
1995 Gothenburg	Jonathan Edwards (GBR)	Brian Wellman (BER)	Jérôme Romain (DMA)
1997 Athens	Yoelbi Quesada (CUB)	Jonathan Edwards (GBR)	Aliecer Urrutia (CUB)
1999 Seville	Charles Friedek (GER)	Rostislav Dimitrov (BUL)	Jonathan Edwards (GBR)
2001 Edmonton	Jonathan Edwards (GBR)	Christian Olsson (SWE)	Igor Spasovkhodskiy (RUS)
2003 Saint-Denis	Christian Olsson (SWE)	Yoandri Betanzos (CUB)	Leevan Sands (BAH)
2005 Helsinki	Walter Davis (USA)	Yoandri Betanzos (CUB)	Marian Oprea (ROU)
2007 Osaka	Nelson Évora (POR)	Jadel Gregório (BRA)	Walter Davis (USA)
2009 Berlin	Phillips Idowu (GBR)	Nelson Évora (POR)	Alexis Copello (CUB)
2011 Daegu	Christian Taylor (USA)	Phillips Idowu (GBR)	Will Claye (USA)
2013 Moscow	Teddy Tamgho (FRA)	Pedro Pichardo (CUB)	Will Claye (USA)
2015 Beijing	Christian Taylor (USA)	Pedro Pichardo (CUB)	Nelson Évora (POR)
2017 London	Christian Taylor (USA)	Will Claye (USA)	Nelson Évora (POR)
2019 Doha	Christian Taylor (USA)	Will Claye (USA)	Hugues Fabrice Zango (BUR)
2022 Eugene	Pedro Pichardo (POR)	Hugues Fabrice Zango (BUR)	Zhu Yaming (CHN)
2023 Budapest	Hugues Fabrice Zango (BUR)	Lázaro Martínez (CUB)	Cristian Nápoles (CUB)
2025 Tokyo	Pedro Pichardo (POR)	Andrea Dallavalle (ITA)	Lázaro Martínez (CUB)

=== Shot put ===
Championships	Gold	Silver	Bronze
1983 Helsinki	Edward Sarul (POL)	Ulf Timmermann (GDR)	Remigius Machura (TCH)
1987 Rome	Werner Günthör (SUI)	Alessandro Andrei (ITA)	John Brenner (USA)
1991 Tokyo	Werner Günthör (SUI)	Lars Arvid Nilsen (NOR)	Aleksandr Klimenko (URS)
1993 Stuttgart	Werner Günthör (SUI)	Randy Barnes (USA)	Oleksandr Bagach (UKR)
1995 Gothenburg	John Godina (USA)	Mika Halvari (FIN)	Randy Barnes (USA)
1997 Athens	John Godina (USA)	Oliver-Sven Buder (GER)	C. J. Hunter (USA)
1999 Seville	C. J. Hunter (USA)	Oliver-Sven Buder (GER)	Oleksandr Bagach (UKR)
2001 Edmonton	John Godina (USA)	Adam Nelson (USA)	Arsi Harju (FIN)
2003 Saint-Denis	Andrei Mikhnevich (BLR)	Adam Nelson (USA)	Yuriy Bilonoh (UKR)
2005 Helsinki	Adam Nelson (USA)	Rutger Smith (NED)	Ralf Bartels (GER)
2007 Osaka	Reese Hoffa (USA)	Adam Nelson (USA)	Rutger Smith (NED)
2009 Berlin	Christian Cantwell (USA)	Tomasz Majewski (POL)	Ralf Bartels (GER)
2011 Daegu	David Storl (GER)	Dylan Armstrong (CAN)	Christian Cantwell (USA)
2013 Moscow	David Storl (GER)	Ryan Whiting (USA)	Dylan Armstrong (CAN)
2015 Beijing	Joe Kovacs (USA)	David Storl (GER)	O'Dayne Richards (JAM)
2017 London	Tom Walsh (NZL)	Joe Kovacs (USA)	Stipe Žunić (CRO)
2019 Doha	Joe Kovacs (USA)	Ryan Crouser (USA)	Tom Walsh (NZL)
2022 Eugene	Ryan Crouser (USA)	Joe Kovacs (USA)	Josh Awotunde (USA)
2023 Budapest	Ryan Crouser (USA)	Leonardo Fabbri (ITA)	Joe Kovacs (USA)
2025 Tokyo	Ryan Crouser (USA)	Uziel Muñoz (MEX)	Leonardo Fabbri (ITA)

=== Discus throw ===
Championships	Gold	Silver	Bronze
1983 Helsinki	Imrich Bugár (TCH)	Luis Delís (CUB)	Géjza Valent (TCH)
1987 Rome	Jürgen Schult (GDR)	John Powell (USA)	Luis Delís (CUB)
1991 Tokyo	Lars Riedel (GER)	Erik de Bruin (NED)	Attila Horváth (HUN)
1993 Stuttgart	Lars Riedel (GER)	Dmitry Shevchenko (RUS)	Jürgen Schult (GER)
1995 Gothenburg	Lars Riedel (GER)	Vladimir Dubrovshchik (BLR)	Vasiliy Kaptyukh (BLR)
1997 Athens	Lars Riedel (GER)	Virgilijus Alekna (LTU)	Jürgen Schult (GER)
1999 Seville	Anthony Washington (USA)	Jürgen Schult (GER)	Lars Riedel (GER)
2001 Edmonton	Lars Riedel (GER)	Virgilijus Alekna (LTU)	Michael Möllenbeck (GER)
2003 Saint-Denis	Virgilijus Alekna (LTU)	Róbert Fazekas (HUN)	Vasiliy Kaptyukh (BLR)
2005 Helsinki	Virgilijus Alekna (LTU)	Gerd Kanter (EST)	Michael Möllenbeck (GER)
2007 Osaka	Gerd Kanter (EST)	Robert Harting (GER)	Rutger Smith (NED)
2009 Berlin	Robert Harting (GER)	Piotr Małachowski (POL)	Gerd Kanter (EST)
2011 Daegu	Robert Harting (GER)	Gerd Kanter (EST)	Ehsan Haddadi (IRI)
2013 Moscow	Robert Harting (GER)	Piotr Małachowski (POL)	Gerd Kanter (EST)
2015 Beijing	Piotr Małachowski (POL)	Philip Milanov (BEL)	Robert Urbanek (POL)
2017 London	Andrius Gudžius (LTU)	Daniel Ståhl (SWE)	Mason Finley (USA)
2019 Doha	Daniel Ståhl (SWE)	Fedrick Dacres (JAM)	Lukas Weißhaidinger (AUT)
2022 Eugene	Kristjan Čeh (SLO)	Mykolas Alekna (LTU)	Andrius Gudžius (LTU)
2023 Budapest	Daniel Ståhl (SWE)	Kristjan Čeh (SLO)	Mykolas Alekna (LTU)
2025 Tokyo	Daniel Ståhl (SWE)	Mykolas Alekna (LTU)	Alex Rose (SAM)

=== Javelin throw ===
Championships	Gold	Silver	Bronze
1983 Helsinki	Detlef Michel (GDR)	Tom Petranoff (USA)	Dainis Kūla (URS)
1987 Rome	Seppo Räty (FIN)	Viktor Yevsyukov (URS)	Jan Železný (TCH)
1991 Tokyo	Kimmo Kinnunen (FIN)	Seppo Räty (FIN)	Vladimir Sasimovich (URS)
1993 Stuttgart	Jan Železný (CZE)	Kimmo Kinnunen (FIN)	Mick Hill (GBR)
1995 Gothenburg	Jan Železný (CZE)	Steve Backley (GBR)	Boris Henry (GER)
1997 Athens	Marius Corbett (RSA)	Steve Backley (GBR)	Konstadinos Gatsioudis (GRE)
1999 Seville	Aki Parviainen (FIN)	Konstadinos Gatsioudis (GRE)	Jan Železný (CZE)
2001 Edmonton	Jan Železný (CZE)	Aki Parviainen (FIN)	Konstadinos Gatsioudis (GRE)
2003 Saint-Denis	Sergey Makarov (RUS)	Andrus Värnik (EST)	Boris Henry (GER)
2005 Helsinki	Andrus Värnik (EST)	Andreas Thorkildsen (NOR)	Sergey Makarov (RUS)
2007 Osaka	Tero Pitkämäki (FIN)	Andreas Thorkildsen (NOR)	Breaux Greer (USA)
2009 Berlin	Andreas Thorkildsen (NOR)	Guillermo Martínez (CUB)	Yukifumi Murakami (JPN)
2011 Daegu	Matthias de Zordo (GER)	Andreas Thorkildsen (NOR)	Guillermo Martínez (CUB)
2013 Moscow	Vítězslav Veselý (CZE)	Tero Pitkämäki (FIN)	Dmitriy Tarabin (RUS)
2015 Beijing	Julius Yego (KEN)	Ihab Abdelrahman (EGY)	Tero Pitkämäki (FIN)
2017 London	Johannes Vetter (GER)	Jakub Vadlejch (CZE)	Petr Frydrych (CZE)
2019 Doha	Anderson Peters (GRN)	Magnus Kirt (EST)	Johannes Vetter (GER)
2022 Eugene	Anderson Peters (GRN)	Neeraj Chopra (IND)	Jakub Vadlejch (CZE)
2023 Budapest	Neeraj Chopra (IND)	Arshad Nadeem (PAK)	Jakub Vadlejch (CZE)
2025 Tokyo	Keshorn Walcott (TRI)	Anderson Peters (GRD)	Curtis Thompson (USA)

=== Hammer throw ===
Championships	Gold	Silver	Bronze
1983 Helsinki	Sergey Litvinov (URS)	Yuriy Sedykh (URS)	Zdzisław Kwaśny (POL)
1987 Rome	Sergey Litvinov (URS)	Jüri Tamm (URS)	Ralf Haber (GDR)
1991 Tokyo	Yuriy Sedykh (URS)	Igor Astapkovich (URS)	Heinz Weis (GER)
1993 Stuttgart	Andrey Abduvaliyev (TJK)	Igor Astapkovich (BLR)	Tibor Gécsek (HUN)
1995 Gothenburg	Andrey Abduvaliyev (TJK)	Igor Astapkovich (BLR)	Tibor Gécsek (HUN)
1997 Athens	Heinz Weis (GER)	Andriy Skvaruk (UKR)	Vasiliy Sidorenko (RUS)
1999 Seville	Karsten Kobs (GER)	Zsolt Németh (HUN)	Vladyslav Piskunov (UKR)
2001 Edmonton	Szymon Ziółkowski (POL)	Koji Murofushi (JPN)	Ilya Konovalov (RUS)
2003 Saint-Denis	Ivan Tsikhan (BLR)	Adrián Annus (HUN)	Koji Murofushi (JPN)
2005 Helsinki	Szymon Ziółkowski (POL)	Markus Esser (GER)	Olli-Pekka Karjalainen (FIN)
2007 Osaka	Ivan Tsikhan (BLR)	Primož Kozmus (SLO)	Libor Charfreitag (SVK)
2009 Berlin	Primož Kozmus (SLO)	Szymon Ziółkowski (POL)	Aleksey Zagornyi (RUS)
2011 Daegu	Koji Murofushi (JPN)	Krisztián Pars (HUN)	Primož Kozmus (SLO)
2013 Moscow	Paweł Fajdek (POL)	Krisztián Pars (HUN)	Lukáš Melich (CZE)
2015 Beijing	Paweł Fajdek (POL)	Dilshod Nazarov (TJK)	Wojciech Nowicki (POL)
2017 London	Paweł Fajdek (POL)	Valeriy Pronkin (ANA)	Wojciech Nowicki (POL)
2019 Doha	Paweł Fajdek (POL)	Quentin Bigot (FRA)	Bence Halász (HUN); Wojciech Nowicki (POL)
2022 Eugene	Paweł Fajdek (POL)	Wojciech Nowicki (POL)	Eivind Henriksen (NOR)
2023 Budapest	Ethan Katzberg (CAN)	Wojciech Nowicki (POL)	Bence Halász (HUN)
2025 Tokyo	Ethan Katzberg (CAN)	Merlin Hummel (GER)	Bence Halász (HUN)

==== Medal table ====
Rank	Nation	Gold	Silver	Bronze	Total
1	Poland (POL)	7	3	4	14
2	Soviet Union (URS)	3	3	0	6
3	Germany (GER)	2	2	1	5
4	Belarus (BLR)	2	2	0	4
5	Tajikistan (TJK)	2	1	0	3
6	Canada (CAN)	2	0	0	2
7	Japan (JPN)	1	1	1	3
7	Slovenia (SLO)	1	1	1	3
9	Hungary (HUN)	0	4	5	9
10	Ukraine (UKR)	0	1	1	2
11	France (FRA)	0	1	0	1
–	Authorised Neutral Athletes (ANA)	0	1	0	1
12	Russia (RUS)	0	0	3	3
13	Czech Republic (CZE)	0	0	1	1
13	East Germany (GDR)	0	0	1	1
13	Finland (FIN)	0	0	1	1
13	Norway (NOR)	0	0	1	1
13	Slovakia (SVK)	0	0	1	1
Totals (17 entries)		20	20	21	61

=== Decathlon ===
Championships	Gold	Silver	Bronze
1983 Helsinki	Daley Thompson (GBR)	Jürgen Hingsen (FRG)	Siegfried Wentz (FRG)
1987 Rome	Torsten Voss (GDR)	Siegfried Wentz (FRG)	Pavel Tarnavetskiy (URS)
1991 Tokyo	Dan O'Brien (USA)	Mike Smith (CAN)	Christian Schenk (GER)
1993 Stuttgart	Dan O'Brien (USA)	Eduard Hämäläinen (BLR)	Paul Meier (GER)
1995 Gothenburg	Dan O'Brien (USA)	Eduard Hämäläinen (BLR)	Mike Smith (CAN)
1997 Athens	Tomáš Dvořák (CZE)	Eduard Hämäläinen (FIN)	Frank Busemann (GER)
1999 Seville	Tomáš Dvořák (CZE)	Dean Macey (GBR)	Chris Huffins (USA)
2001 Edmonton	Tomáš Dvořák (CZE)	Erki Nool (EST)	Dean Macey (GBR)
2003 Saint-Denis	Tom Pappas (USA)	Roman Šebrle (CZE)	Dmitriy Karpov (KAZ)
2005 Helsinki	Bryan Clay (USA)	Roman Šebrle (CZE)	Attila Zsivoczky (HUN)
2007 Osaka	Roman Šebrle (CZE)	Maurice Smith (JAM)	Dmitriy Karpov (KAZ)
2009 Berlin	Trey Hardee (USA)	Leonel Suárez (CUB)	Aleksandr Pogorelov (RUS)
2011 Daegu	Trey Hardee (USA)	Ashton Eaton (USA)	Leonel Suárez (CUB)
2013 Moscow	Ashton Eaton (USA)	Michael Schrader (GER)	Damian Warner (CAN)
2015 Beijing	Ashton Eaton (USA)	Damian Warner (CAN)	Rico Freimuth (GER)
2017 London	Kevin Mayer (FRA)	Rico Freimuth (GER)	Kai Kazmirek (GER)
2019 Doha	Niklas Kaul (GER)	Maicel Uibo (EST)	Damian Warner (CAN)
2022 Eugene	Kevin Mayer (FRA)	Pierce LePage (CAN)	Zach Ziemek (USA)
2023 Budapest	Pierce LePage (CAN)	Damian Warner (CAN)	Lindon Victor (GRN)
2025 Tokyo	Leo Neugebauer (GER)	Ayden Owens-Delerme (PUR)	Kyle Garland (USA)

== See also ==
- List of Olympic medalists in athletics (men)
- List of World Championships in Athletics medalists (women)
- List of men's Olympic and World Championship athletics sprint champions
