= Athletics at the 1991 Pan American Games – Men's 400 metres =

Men's 400 metres at the Pan American Games

The men's 400 metres event at the 1991 Pan American Games was held in Havana, Cuba on 4 and 5 August.

== Medalists ==
Gold	Silver	Bronze
Roberto Hernández; Cuba	Ian Morris; Trinidad and Tobago	Jeff Reynolds; United States

== Results ==
=== Heats ===
Rank	Heat	Name	Nationality	Time	Notes
1	1	Roberto Hernández	Cuba	45.54	Q
2	2	Ian Morris	Trinidad and Tobago	45.63	Q
3	3	Quincy Watts	United States	46.02	Q
4	2	Jeff Reynolds	United States	46.06	Q
5	1	Howard Burnett	Jamaica	46.20	Q
6	2	Jorge Valentín	Cuba	46.22	q
7	1	Seibert Straughn	Barbados	46.63	q
8	3	Michael Anderson	Jamaica	46.67	Q
9	1	Tommy Asinga	Suriname	46.89	NR
10	3	Carlos Morales	Chile	47.00	
11	3	Alvin Daniel	Trinidad and Tobago	47.17	
11	3	Ronald Thorne	Barbados	47.17	
13	2	Roberto Bortolotto	Brazil	47.22	
14	2	Anthony Wilson	Canada	47.29	
15	1	Mike McLean	Canada	47.49	
16	3	Desai Wynter	United States Virgin Islands	47.97	
17	3	Eversley Linley	Saint Vincent and the Grenadines	48.15	
18	1	Keith Smith	United States Virgin Islands	48.22	
19	1	William Archer	British Virgin Islands	48.65	
19	2	Howard Lindsey	Antigua and Barbuda	48.65	
21	1	Eswort Coombs	Saint Vincent and the Grenadines	49.32	
22	3	John Palacio	Belize	50.18	
	2	Michael Joseph	Belize	DNS	

=== Final ===
Rank	Name	Nationality	Time	Notes
1st place, gold medalist(s)	Roberto Hernández	Cuba	44.52	
2nd place, silver medalist(s)	Ian Morris	Trinidad and Tobago	45.24	
3rd place, bronze medalist(s)	Jeff Reynolds	United States	45.81	
4	Quincy Watts	United States	46.01	
5	Jorge Valentín	Cuba	46.03	
6	Howard Burnett	Jamaica	46.10	
7	Seibert Straughn	Barbados	46.67	
8	Michael Anderson	Jamaica	47.92	
