= 1991 World Championships in Athletics – Men's 4 × 400 metres relay =

External videos
- Men's 4x400m Final, World Championships Tokyo 1991 on YouTube

These are the official results of the Men's 4 × 400 metres event at the 1991 IAAF World Championships in Tokyo, Japan. There were a total number of sixteen participating nations, with three qualifying heats and the final held on Sunday 1 September 1991. The final was won by Great Britain in what was, at the time, the fourth fastest time in history (behind the USA team's 1988 World Record, and two other US times). Going into the meeting, the USA 4 × 400 metres team hadn't lost at a major championships in over seven years. Britain, by contrast, hadn't won a gold medal in the event since the 1936 Berlin Olympics.

The British team made a tactical change, switching their top runner Roger Black, expected to be the anchor leg runner, to the first leg. The move paid off. Black ran a 44.6 first leg, catching Andrew Valmon before the handoff. giving Derek Redmond the edge to beat Quincy Watts to the break. Both Watts and Redmond would become famous the following year, Watts for winning the Olympic gold medal in the 400 metres and Redmond for his determination, finishing his semi-final race in that same event with a torn hamstring, assisted by his father. Watts ran a 44.1 leg to catch Redmond, but it could have been faster because Watts had to pass Redmond on the outside of the turn due to the British team's superior position. Danny Everett was not able to put any distance on John Regis, even having to fend off a challenge on the final straightaway, so going into the final leg, the USA held only a small lead. Kriss Akabusi, running the anchor leg paced off of the individual 400m Champion, Antonio Pettigrew, then dramatically overtook him on the home straight to win. The USA team was so shocked by the result, that even on the medal podium, they were still in disbelief at the result. Indeed, television footage immediately after the race, showed Pettigrew standing, hands on hips, shaking his head at the outcome of the race. The result was the only time out of eight major championships over a twelve-year span that the USA team failed to win gold.

The winning margin was 0.04 seconds which as of 2024 remains the only time the men's 4 × 400 metres relay was won by less than a tenth of a second at these championships.

== Schedule ==
- All times are Japan Standard Time (UTC+9)

Semi-Final
31.08.1991 – 20:20h
Final
01.09.1991 – 18:10h

== Final ==
RANK	FINAL	ATHLETES	TIME
	Great Britain (GBR)	• Roger Black • Derek Redmond • John Regis • Kriss Akabusi	2:57.53 (NR)
	United States (USA)	• Andrew Valmon • Quincy Watts • Danny Everett • Antonio Pettigrew	2:57.57
	Jamaica (JAM)	• Patrick O'Connor • Devon Morris • Winthrop Graham • Seymour Fagan	3:00.10
4.	Yugoslavia (YUG)	• Dejan Jovković • Nenad Đurović • Ismail Mačev • Slobodan Branković	3:00.32
5.	Kenya (KEN)	• Samson Kitur • Simon Kemboi • Charles Gitonga • Simon Kipkemboi	3:00.34
6.	Germany (GER)	• Klaus Just • Rico Lieder • Norbert Dobeleit • Jens Carlowitz	3:00.75
7.	Morocco (MAR)	• Abdelali Kasbane • Ali Dahane • Bouchaib Belkaid • Benyounés Lahlou	3:04.49
8.	Cuba (CUB)	• Agustín Pavó • Héctor Herrera • Jorge Valentín • Lázaro Martínez	3:05.33

== Qualifying heats ==
- Held on Saturday 1991-08-31

RANK	HEAT 1	ATHLETES	TIME
1.	United States (USA)	• Jeff Reynolds • Quincy Watts • Mark Everett • Danny Everett	2:59.55
2.	Jamaica (JAM)	• Howard Burnett • Devon Morris • Patrick O'Connor • Seymour Fagan	3:00.01
3.	Germany (GER)	• Klaus Just • Rico Lieder • Norbert Dobeleit • Jens Carlowitz	3:00.17
4.	Japan (JPN)	• Koichi Konakatomi • Susumu Takano • Takahiro Watanabe • Koji Ito	3:01.26
5.	Qatar (QAT)	• Sami Jumah • Ismael Youssef • Masoud Khamis Rahman • Ibrahim Ismail Muftah	3:07.06
6.	Spain (ESP)	• Luis Cumellas • Antonio Sanchez • Moises Fernández • Didac Manas	3:08.39

RANK	HEAT 2	ATHLETES	TIME
1.	Morocco (MAR)	• Abdelali Kasbane • Ali Dahane • Bouchaib Belkaid • Benyounés Lahlou	3:02.11 (NR)
2.	Cuba (CUB)	• Agustín Pavó • Héctor Herrera • Jorge Valentín • Lázaro Martínez	3:02.29
3.	Italy (ITA)	• Fabio Grossi • Marco Vaccari • Alessandro Aimar • Andrea Nuti	3:02.72
4.	Canada (CAN)	• Anthony Wilson • Mark Jackson • Mike McLean • Freddie Williams	3:03.68
5.	Mexico (MEX)	• Raymundo Escalante • Eduardo Nava • Josue Morales • Luis Toledo	3:09.56
—	France (FRA)	• Andre Jaffory • Olivier Noirot • Stéphane Diagana • Christophe Goris	DNF

RANK	HEAT 3	ATHLETES	TIME
1.	Great Britain (GBR)	• Ade Mafe • Derek Redmond • Mark Richardson • Kriss Akabusi	2:59.49
2.	Yugoslavia (YUG)	• Dejan Jovković • Nenad Đurović • Ismail Mačev • Slobodan Branković	2:59.95 (NR)
3.	Kenya (KEN)	• Samson Kitur • Simon Kemboi • Charles Gitonga • Simon Kipkemboi	3:00.21
4.	Australia (AUS)	• Dean Capobianco • Paul Greene • Rohan Robinson • Mark Garner	3:02.42
5.	Barbados (BAR)	• Terrence Harewood • Steven Roberts • Seibert Straughn • Michael Williams	3:05.63

== See also ==
- 1988 Men's Olympic 4 × 400 m Relay (Seoul)
- 1990 Men's European Championships 4 × 400 m Relay (Split)
- 1992 Men's Olympic 4 × 400 m Relay (Barcelona)
- 1993 Men's World Championships 4 × 400 m Relay (Stuttgart)

== Notes ==
In 2002 this race came 42nd in the TV programme 100 Greatest Sporting Moments by Channel 4 of the UK.
