= Athletics at the 1990 Goodwill Games =

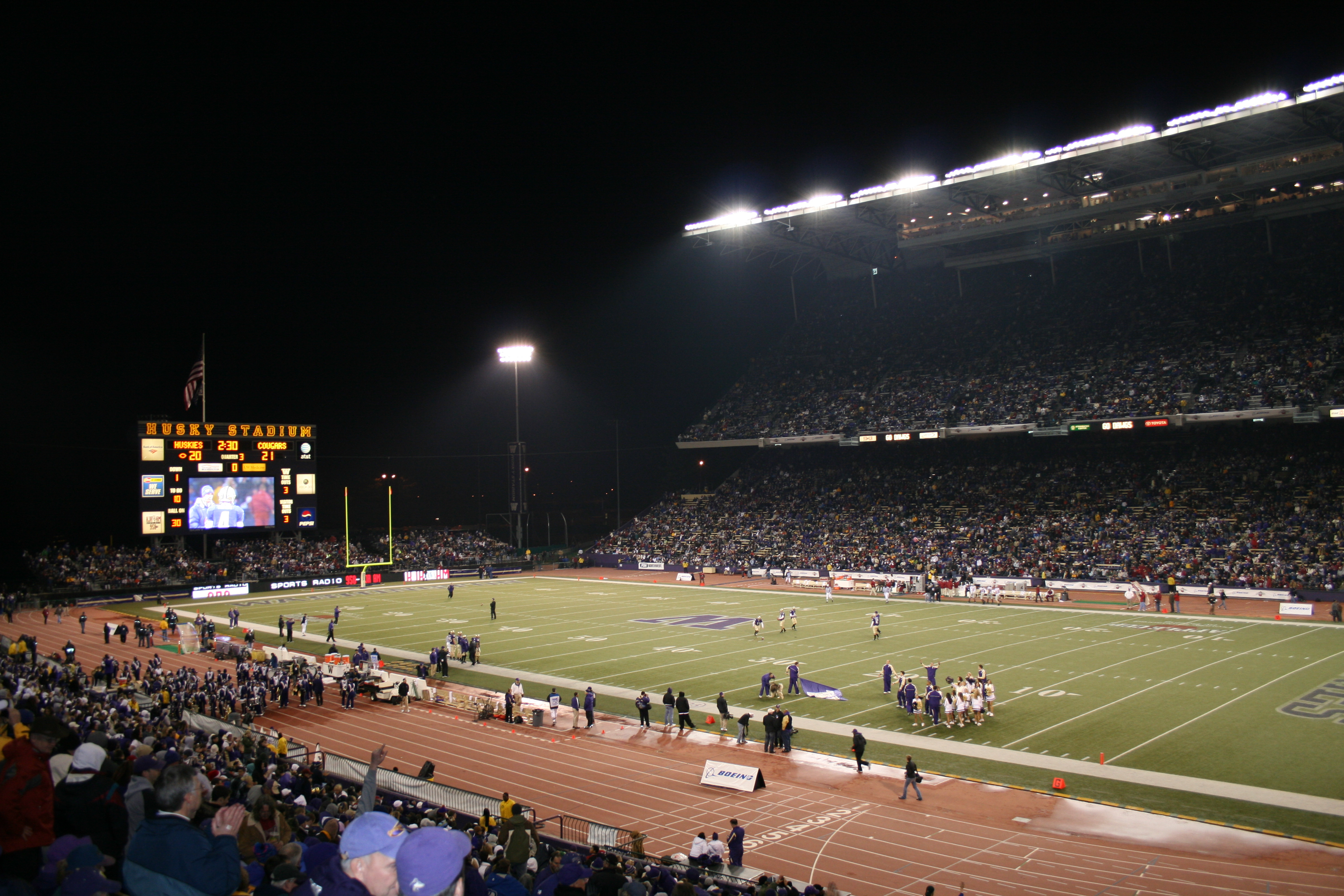
- Husky Stadium was the athletics venue for the 1990 Games
- Dates: July 22–26, 1990
- Host city: Seattle, United States
- Venue: Husky Stadium
- Events: 43
- Participation: 370 athletes from 28 nations
- Records set: 1 world record 14 Games records

At the 1990 Goodwill Games, the athletics events were held in Seattle, Washington, United States between July 22 and 26, 1990. A total of 43 events were contested, of which 23 by male and 20 by female athletes. Athletes from the United States and the Soviet Union dominated the competition as they had done in the inaugural edition, with United States coming out on top this time with 54 medal won, 20 of them gold. The Soviet Union was a clear second place with 14 golds and 43 medals in total. The Greater Antillean island nations of Cuba and Jamaica had the third- and fourth-greatest medal hauls, respectively.

The number of competitors in each event was smaller than that of the 1986 Goodwill Games and the invited athletes only had to compete in a single final, rather than the qualification-round model typically found at multi-sport events. Fourteen Games records were beaten in the second edition and one world record was also set at the competition – Nadezhda Ryashkina of the Soviet Union beat the previous best mark in the 10,000 metres track walk with her time of 41:56.23. The 1990 Games saw the athletics competition's first doping infractions, as Tamara Bykova and Larisa Nikitina (both from the Soviet Union) lost their silver medals after testing positive for performance-enhancing drugs.

Ana Fidelia Quirot of Cuba became the first athlete to win two individual gold medals at a single edition of the Games as she won the 400 metres and 800 metres races. The United States took clean sweeps in both the men's and women's 100 metres events, and the Soviet Union completed the same feat in the men's hammer throw and women's marathon competitions. Addis Abebe finished as runner-up in the 5000 and 10,000 metres to win Ethiopia's only medals of the entire Games. Sheila Echols left the Games with one medal of each colour, having won the 4×100 m relay gold, 100 m silver, and long jump bronze. Among the other notable multiple medallists, Carl Lewis won the 100 m silver and the long jump gold.

== Records ==
Name	Event	Country	Record	Type
Nadezhda Ryashkina	10,000 metres track walk	Soviet Union	41:56.23	WR
Key:WR — World record • AR — Area record • GR — Games record • NR — National record

== Medal summary ==
=== Men ===
Event	Gold		Silver		Bronze	
100 metres	Leroy Burrell (USA)	10.05	Carl Lewis (USA)	10.08	Mark Witherspoon (USA)	10.17
200 metres	Michael Johnson (USA)	20.54	Robson da Silva (BRA)	20.77	Dennis Mitchell (USA)	20.89
400 metres	Roberto Hernández (CUB)	44.79 GR	Danny Everett (USA)	45.05	Andrew Valmon (USA)	45.46
800 metres	George Kersh (USA)	1:45.10 GR	Mark Everett (USA)	1:45.80	José Luíz Barbosa (BRA)	1:45.81
1500 metres	Joe Falcon (USA)	3:39.97	William Tanui (KEN)	3:40.13	Marcus O'Sullivan (IRL)	3:40.58
5000 metres	Paul Williams (CAN)	13:33.52 GR	Addis Abebe (ETH)	13:35.67	Mikhail Dasko (URS)	13:36.44
10,000 metres	Hammou Boutayeb (MAR)	27:26.43 GR	Addis Abebe (ETH)	27:42.65	John Ngugi (KEN)	27:42.95
110 metres hurdles	Roger Kingdom (USA)	13.47	Tony Dees (USA)	13.48	Arthur Blake (USA)	13.53
400 metres hurdles	Winthrop Graham (JAM)	48.78	Dave Patrick (USA)	49.00	Kevin Young (USA)	49.17
3000 metres steeplechase	Brian Diemer (USA)	8:32.24	Vasily Koromyslov (URS)	8:33.76	Valeriy Vandyak (URS)	8:34.18
4×100 metres relay	United States (USA); Mike Marsh; Daron Council; Andre Cason; Dennis Mitchell	38.45	Cuba (CUB); Andrés Simón; Leandro Peñalver; Félix Stevens; Joel Isasi	38.49	Soviet Union (URS); Viktor Bryzgin; Vladimir Krylov; Oleg Fatun; Pavel Galkin	38.96
4×400 metres relay	United States (USA); Clarence Daniel; Andrew Valmon; Antonio Pettigrew; Tim Simon	2:59.54 GR	Jamaica (JAM); Seymour Fagan; Devon Morris; Howard Burnett; Patrick O'Connor	3:00.45	Cuba (CUB); Juan Martínez; Félix Stevens; Héctor Herrera; Roberto Hernández	3:03.35
Marathon	Dave Mora (USA)	2:14:50	Nikolay Tabak (URS)	2:16:28	Peter Maher (CAN)	2:17:16
20,000 m track walk	Ernesto Canto (MEX)	1:23:13.12 GR	Mikhail Shchennikov (URS)	1:23:22.34	Bernd Gummelt (GDR)	1:23:29.61
High jump	Hollis Conway (USA)	2.33 m	Doug Nordquist (USA)	2.30 m	Tony Barton (USA)	2.30 m
Pole vault	Rodion Gataullin (URS)	5.92 m	Grigoriy Yegorov (URS)	5.87 m	Tim Bright (USA)	5.77 m
Long jump	Carl Lewis (USA)	8.38 m	Mike Powell (USA)	8.34 m	Robert Emmiyan (URS)	8.23 m
Triple jump	Kenny Harrison (USA)	17.72 m GR	Mike Conley (USA)	17.48 m	Volodymyr Inozemtsev (URS)	17.06 m
Shot put	Randy Barnes (USA)	21.44 m	Jim Doehring (USA)	21.12 m	Vyacheslav Lykho (URS)	20.70 m
Discus throw	Romas Ubartas (URS)	67.14 m GR	Kamy Keshmiri (USA)	65.50 m	Mike Buncic (USA)	62.06 m
Hammer throw	Igor Astapkovich (URS)	84.12 m	Andrey Abduvaliyev (URS)	82.20 m	Igor Nikulin (URS)	82.14 m
Javelin throw	Viktor Zaytsev (URS)	84.16 m GR	Ramón González (CUB)	80.84 m	Masami Yoshida (JPN)	77.36 m
Decathlon	Dave Johnson (USA)	8403 pts GR	Dan O'Brien (USA)	8358 pts	Mikhail Medved (URS)	8330 pts

=== Women ===
Event	Gold		Silver		Bronze	
100 metres	Carlette Guidry (USA)	11.03	Sheila Echols (USA)	11.05	Michelle Finn (USA)	11.05
200 metres	Dannette Young (USA)	22.64	Pauline Davis (BAH)	22.88	Grace Jackson (JAM)	22.96
400 metres	Ana Fidelia Quirot (CUB)	50.34	Lyudmila Dzhigalova (URS)	51.38	Rochelle Stevens (USA)	51.54
800 metres	Ana Fidelia Quirot (CUB)	1:57.42 GR	Liliya Nurutdinova (URS)	1:57.52	Tatyana Grebenchuk (URS)	1:58.21
1500 metres	Natalya Artyomova (URS)	4:09.48	Yekaterina Podkopayeva (URS)	4:09.91	PattiSue Plumer (USA)	4:10.72
3000 metres	PattiSue Plumer (USA)	8:51.59	Yelena Romanova (URS)	8:51.79	Lynn Jennings (USA)	8:52.34
5000 metres	Yelena Romanova (URS)	15:02.23 GR	Viorica Ghican (ROM)	15:27.77	Sabrina Dornhoefer (USA)	15:38.87
10,000 metres	Wanda Panfil (POL)	32:01.17 GR	Cathy O'Brien (USA)	32:05.40	Olga Nazarkina (URS)	32:05.76
100 metres hurdles	Nataliya Grygoryeva (URS)	12.70	Lyudmila Narozhilenko (URS)	12.88	LaVonna Martin (USA)	12.89
400 metres hurdles	Sandra Farmer-Patrick (USA)	55.16	Schowonda Williams (USA)	55.65	Lyudmila Khodosevich (URS)	57.33
4×100 metres relay	United States (USA); Carlette Guidry; Sheila Echols; Michelle Finn; Evelyn Ashford	42.46	Soviet Union (URS); Yelena Bykova; Galina Malchugina; Natalya Kovtun; Irina Sergeyeva	42.67	Jamaica (JAM); Michelle Freeman; Juliet Campbell; Layphane Carnagie; Ethlyn Tate	44.12
4×400 metres relay	Soviet Union (URS) "A"; Yelena Vinogradova; Marina Shmonina; Yelena Ruzina; Lyudmyla Dzhyhalova	3:23.70	United States (USA); Natasha Kaiser; Rochelle Stevens; Lillie Leatherwood; Maicel Malone	3:24.53	Soviet Union (URS) "B"; Nadezhda Loboyko; Tatyana Grebenchuk; Nadiya Olizarenko; Liliya Nurutdinova	3:30.60
Marathon	Zoya Ivanova (URS)	2:34:38	Irina Bogachova (URS)	2:36:25	Ramilya Burangulova (URS)	2:37:41
10,000 m track walk	Nadezhda Ryashkina (URS)	41:56.23 WR GR	Kerry Saxby (AUS)	41:57.22	Beate Anders (GDR)	42:48.51
High jump †	Yelena Yelesina (URS)	2.02 m	Yolanda Henry (USA)	1.92 m	Megumi Sato (JPN)	1.89 m
Long jump	Inessa Kravets (URS)	6.93 m	Larisa Berezhnaya (URS)	6.61 m	Sheila Echols (USA)	6.51 m
Shot put	Natalya Lisovskaya (URS)	20.60 m	Huang Zhihong (CHN)	20.50 m	Belsis Laza (CUB)	18.98 m
Discus throw	Ilke Wyludda (GDR)	68.08 m	Irina Yatchenko (URS)	67.04 m	Olga Burova (URS)	65.46 m
Javelin throw	Natalya Shikolenko (URS)	61.62 m	Tatyana Shikolenko (URS)	59.06 m	Karin Smith (USA)	58.94 m
Heptathlon ††	Jackie Joyner-Kersee (USA)	6783 pts	Svetlana Zinina (URS)	6128 pts	Gea Johnson (USA)	5963 pts

- † = Tamara Bykova of the Soviet Union initially won the high jump silver medal with a jump of 1.92 m, but was later disqualified for ephedrine usage
- †† = Larisa Nikitina of the Soviet Union initially won the heptathlon silver medal with 6236 points, but was later disqualified after testing positive for banned amphetamines

== Medal table ==
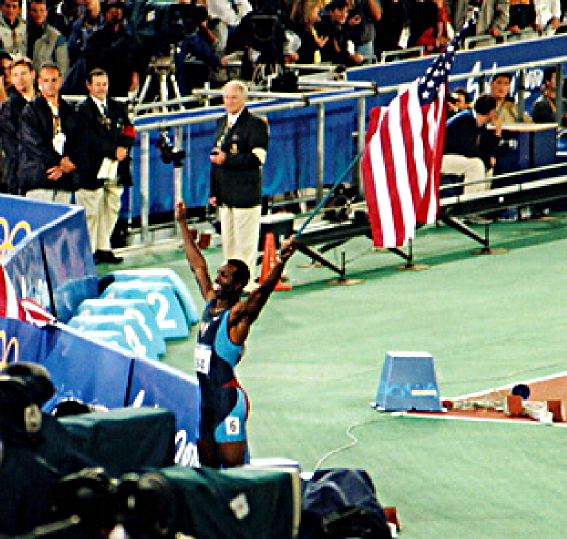
Michael Johnson took the 200 m gold for the United States

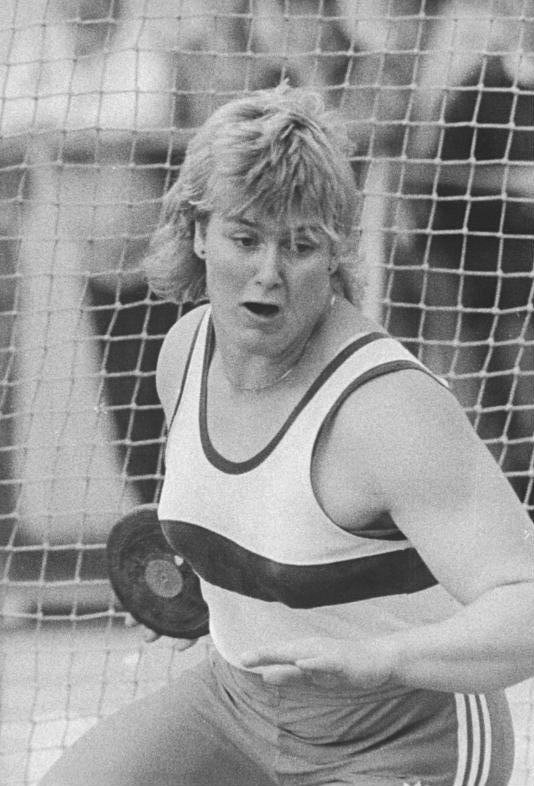
Ilke Wyludda won East Germany's only gold in the women's discus.

* Host nation (United States)

Rank	Nation	Gold	Silver	Bronze	Total
1	United States*	20	16	18	54
2	Soviet Union	14	16	13	43
3	Cuba	3	2	2	7
4	Jamaica	1	1	2	4
5	East Germany	1	0	2	3
6	Canada	1	0	1	2
7	Mexico	1	0	0	1
7	Morocco	1	0	0	1
7	Poland	1	0	0	1
10	Ethiopia	0	2	0	2
11	Brazil	0	1	1	2
11	Kenya	0	1	1	2
13	Australia	0	1	0	1
13	Bahamas	0	1	0	1
13	China	0	1	0	1
13	Romania	0	1	0	1
17	Japan	0	0	2	2
18	Ireland	0	0	1	1
Totals (18 entries)		43	43	43	129

== Participation ==
- Algeria (2)
- Australia (4)
- Bahamas (2)
- Brazil (3)
- Canada (19)
- China (4)
- Colombia (2)
- Cuba (17)
- East Germany (5)
- Ecuador (1)
- Ethiopia (6)
- France (3)
- Greece (1)
- Iceland (1)
- Ireland (2)
- Italy (3)
- Jamaica (19)
- Japan (5)
- Kenya (3)
- Morocco (4)
- Mexico (10)
- Nigeria (5)
- Poland (1)
- Romania (5)
- Soviet Union (103)
- Tanzania (2)
- United States (136)
- West Germany (2)
