= Athletics at the 1989 Summer Universiade – Men's 4 × 400 metres relay =

The men's 4 × 400 metres relay event at the 1989 Summer Universiade was held at the Wedaustadion in Duisburg with the final on 29 and 30 August 1989.

== Results ==
=== Heats ===
Rank	Heat	Nation	Athletes	Time	Notes
1	1	United States	Stanley Kerr, George Porter, Michael Johnson, Raymond Pierre	3:03.31	Q
2	2	Jamaica	Patrick O'Connor, Devon Morris, Howard Davis, Howard Burnett	3:06.25	Q
3	1	West Germany	Ulrich Schlepütz, Markus Henrich, Carsten Köhrbrück, Edgar Itt	3:06.35	Q
4	1	Italy	Alessandro Pinna, Tiziano Gemelli, Riccardo Cardone, Mauro Maurizi	3:06.98	Q
5	2	Soviet Union	Vladimir Popov, Aleksey Bazarov, Aleksey Petukhov, Yevgeniy Lomtyev	3:07.84	Q
6	1	Spain	Moisés Fernández, Manuel Moreno, Andrés Vaquero, Antonio Sánchez	3:07.21	q
7	1	Netherlands	Arjen Visserman, Tonny Baltus, Rob van de Klundert, Junior de Lain	3:08.21	q
8	1	Senegal	Moustapha Diarra, Hachim Ndiaye, Hamidou M'Baye, Aboubakry Dia	3:08.25	
9	2	Great Britain	Richard Hill, Ikem Billy, Paul Dennis, Darren Bernard	3:08.71	Q
10	2	Japan	Katsutoshi Iwasa, Seiichi Ibe, Yoshito Toyada, Koichi Konakatomi	3:09.19	
11	2	Chinese Taipei	Wu Cheng-ho, Chang Yuh-cheng, Lin Kuan-liang, Lin Jin-hsiung	3:20.16	
12	2	Hong Kong	Hau Yiu Chung, Cheung Shiu Sun, Lam Wai Keung, Lee Ka Kit	3:23.60	
	1	Mexico	Luis Karin Toledo, Juan Gutiérrez, Josue Morales, Raymundo Escalante	DQ	

=== Final ===
Rank	Nation	Athletes	Time	Notes
1st place, gold medalist(s)	Jamaica	Patrick O'Connor, Devon Morris, Howard Davis, Howard Burnett	3:02.58	
2nd place, silver medalist(s)	United States	Stanley Kerr, George Porter, Michael Johnson, Raymond Pierre	3:02.75	
3rd place, bronze medalist(s)	West Germany	Ulrich Schlepütz, Markus Henrich, Carsten Köhrbrück, Edgar Itt	3:03.69	
4	Soviet Union	Arkadiy Kornilov, Aleksey Bazarov, Aleksey Petukhov, Aivar Ojastu	3:04.02	
5	Italy	Alessandro Pinna, Tiziano Gemelli, Riccardo Cardone, Marcello Pantone	3:05.26	
6	Netherlands	Arjen Visserman, Tonny Baltus, Alan Ellsworth, Junior de Lain	3:09.04	
7	Spain	Moisés Fernández, Manuel Moreno, Andrés Vaquero, Antonio Sánchez	3:09.47	
	Great Britain		DNS	
