= World champions in athletics =

World champions in athletics may refer to:

- List of World Athletics Championships medalists (men)
- List of World Athletics Championships medalists (women)
