= Agustín Pavó =

Cuban sprinter

Personal information
- Born: May 28, 1962 (age 64)
Medal record
Men's athletics
Representing Cuba
Pan American Games
Gold medal – first place	1991 Havana	4x400 m relay
Silver medal – second place	1987 Indianapolis	4x400 m relay
Bronze medal – third place	1983 Caracas	4x400 m relay
World Championships
Bronze medal – third place	1987 Rome	4x400 m relay

Agustín Pavó (born May 28, 1962) is a retired male track and field athlete from Cuba who competed in the sprint events during his career. He won the gold medal in the men's 4 × 400 metres relay at the 1991 Pan American Games, alongside teammates Héctor Herrera, Jorge Valentin and Lázaro Martínez.

== International competitions ==
Year	Competition	Venue	Position	Event	Notes
Representing Cuba
1982	Central American and Caribbean Games	Havana, Cuba	2nd	400 m	45.87
1982	Central American and Caribbean Games	Havana, Cuba	1st	4 × 400 m relay	3:03.59
1983	Universiade	Edmonton, Canada	–	4 × 400 m relay	DNF
1983	Central American and Caribbean Championships	Havana, Cuba	2nd	400 m	46.74
1983	Central American and Caribbean Championships	Havana, Cuba	1st	4 × 400 m relay	3:05.12
1983	Pan American Games	Caracas, Venezuela	3rd	4 × 400 m relay	3:03.15
1985	World Indoor Games	Paris, France	15th (h)	200 m	22.48
1986	Central American and Caribbean Games	Santiago, Dominican Republic	5th	400 m	46.33
1986	Central American and Caribbean Games	Santiago, Dominican Republic	1st	4 × 400 m relay	38.74
1987	Central American and Caribbean Championships	Caracas, Venezuela	3rd	4 × 400 m relay	3:07.17
1987	Pan American Games	Indianapolis, United States	2nd	4 × 400 m relay	3:02.41
1987	World Championships	Rome, Italy	3rd	4 × 400 m relay	2:59.16
1991	Pan American Games	Havana, Cuba	1st	4 × 400 m relay	3:01.93
1991	World Championships	Tokyo, Japan	8th	4 × 400 m relay	3:05.33
