= Patrick O'Connor (sprinter) =

Jamaican sprinter and world championship bronze medalist

Personal information
- Born: 17 September 1966 (age 59) St. Catherine, Jamaica

Sport
- Sport: Track and field
Medal record
Representing Jamaica
World Championships
Bronze medal – third place	1991 Tokyo	4x400m relay
Pan American Games
Bronze medal – third place	1991 Havana	4x400m relay
Summer Universiade
Gold medal – first place	1989 Duisburg	4x400m relay
Gold medal – first place	1991 Sheffield	400m

Patrick Earl O'Connor (born 17 September 1966) is a retired Jamaican sprinter who specialized in the 400 metres. He won a bronze medal in 4 × 400 metres relay at the 1991 World Championships, together with teammates Seymour Fagan, Devon Morris and Winthrop Graham.

O'Connor competed for the George Mason Patriots track and field team in the NCAA.

== International competitions ==
Year	Competition	Venue	Position	Event	Notes
Representing Jamaica
1989	Central American and Caribbean Championships	San Juan, Puerto Rico	3rd	200 m	
1989	World Student Games	Duisburg, Germany	16th (sf)	200 m	21.51
1989	World Student Games	Duisburg, Germany	4th	4 × 100 m relay	39.86
1989	World Student Games	Duisburg, Germany	1st	4 × 400 m relay	3:02.58
1990	Goodwill Games	Seattle, United States	2nd	4 × 400 m relay	
1991	Pan American Games	Havana, Cuba	3rd	4 × 400 m relay	
1991	World Student Games	Sheffield, United Kingdom	1st	400 m	
1991	World Championships	Tokyo, Japan	3rd	4 × 400 m relay	
1992	Olympic Games	Barcelona, Spain	—	4 × 400 m relay	DQ
1993	World Championships	Stuttgart, Germany	7th	4 × 400 m relay	
