= Héctor Herrera (runner) =

Cuban middle-distance runner

Personal information
- Born: May 23, 1959 (age 67) Camagüey Province, Cuba

Sport
- Sport: Track and field
Medal record
Representing Cuba
Olympic Games
Silver medal – second place	1992 Barcelona	4x400 m relay
Pan American Games
Gold medal – first place	1991 Havana	4x400m relay
Bronze medal – third place	1983 Caracas	4x400m relay
Central American and Caribbean Games
Silver medal – second place	1993 Ponce	800m
Silver medal – second place	1993 Ponce	4x400m relay
Bronze medal – third place	1990 Mexico City	4x400m relay

Héctor Herrera Ortiz (born May 23, 1959) is a Cuban former 800 metres runner who won an Olympic silver medal in 4 x 400 metres relay in 1992 Barcelona, together with teammates Lázaro Martínez, Norberto Téllez and Roberto Hernández.

Herrera also won a silver medal in 800 metres at the 1993 Central American and Caribbean Games.

== International competitions ==
Year	Competition	Venue	Position	Event	Notes
Representing Cuba
1983	Pan American Games	Caracas, Venezuela	11th (h)	800 m	1:51.01
1983	Pan American Games	Caracas, Venezuela	3rd	4 × 400 m relay	3:03.15
1988	Ibero-American Championships	Mexico City, Mexico	5th	800 m	1:49.08 A
1990	Goodwill Games	Seattle, United States	3rd	4 × 400 m relay	3:03.35
1990	Central American and Caribbean Games	Mexico City, Mexico	6th	400 m	46.80
1990	Central American and Caribbean Games	Mexico City, Mexico	3rd	4 × 400 m relay	3:06.17
1991	Pan American Games	Havana, Cuba	6th	800 m	1:48.12
1991	Pan American Games	Havana, Cuba	1st	4 × 400 m relay	3:01.93
1991	World Championships	Tokyo, Japan	8th	4 × 400 m relay	3:05.33
1992	Ibero-American Championships	Seville, Spain	1st	800 m	1:47.72
1992	Olympic Games	Barcelona, Spain	2nd	4 × 400 m relay	2:59.51
1993	Central American and Caribbean Games	Ponce, Puerto Rico	2nd	800 m	1:49.99
1993	Central American and Caribbean Games	Ponce, Puerto Rico	2nd	4 × 400 m relay	3:02.58
1993	World Championships	Stuttgart, Germany	6th	4 × 400 m relay	3:00.46
