= Simon Kemboi =

Kenyan sprinter (born 1967)

Personal information
- Nationality: Kenyan
- Born: March 1, 1967 (age 59)

Sport
- Country: Kenya
- Sport: Athletics
- Event: 400 metres
Medal record
Men's athletics
Representing Kenya
World Championships
Silver medal – second place	1993 Stuttgart	4×400 m
African Championships
Gold medal – first place	1993 Durban	4×400 m
Silver medal – second place	1996 Yaoundé	400 m
Bronze medal – third place	1993 Durban	400 m
Representing Africa
IAAF World Cup
Gold medal – first place	1992 Havana	4x400 m relay

Simon Kemboi (born March 1, 1967) is a retired sprinter from Kenya. He specialised in 400 metres. He is a World Championships and African Championships medalist, and competed at the Olympics.

== Career ==
Kemboi was part of the 4x400 relay team that finished fifth at the 1991 World Championships. He competed at the Olympics for first time at the 1992 Summer Olympics, taking part in 400 metres, where he reached semifinal. He was also part of the Kenyan 4x400 relay team that advanced to the final, but did not finish it. At the 1992 IAAF World Cup, he was part of the African 4 × 400 m team that won gold.

At the 1993 World Championships, he won silver part of the Kenyan 4 × 400 m relay team. Other members of the team were Samson Kitur, Kennedy Ochieng and Abednego Matilu. In the 400 metres individual race he was 7th. He won bronze over 400 metres at the 1993 African Championships in a race won by compatriot Kennedy Ochieng, and may have been part of the Kenyan 4 × 400 m team that won gold.

The second of his two Olympics assignment was at the 1996 Summer Olympics, when he competed only at the 4x400 metres relay race, where Kenya reached the final again, but did not start it. He won silver over 400 metres at the 1996 African Championships in Athletics. The Kenyan 4 × 400 m team won also silver.

=== Doping ===
He was selected to compete at the 2000 Summer Olympics, but was suspended after testing positive for nandrolone in September 2000.
