= Tiziano Gemelli =

Italian sprinter

Personal information
- Nationality: Italian
- Born: 2 November 1961 (age 64) Pavia, Italy

Sport
- Country: Italy
- Sport: Athletics
- Event: 400 metres

Achievements and titles
- Personal best: 400 m: 46.31 (1987)

Tiziano Gemelli (born 2 November 1961) is an Italian male retired sprinter, who participated at the 1987 World Championships in Athletics.

== Achievements ==
Year	Competition	Venue	Position	Event	Performance	Notes
1987	World Championships	(Italy) Rome	Semi	4x400 metres relay	3:03.91	
