= Seymour Fagan =

Jamaican sprinter

Seymour Fagan (born 30 December 1967 in Old Harbour Bay) is a retired male track and field sprinter from Jamaica who specializes in the 400 metres. He won a bronze medal in the 4 × 400 metres relay at the 1991 World Championships, together with teammates Patrick O'Connor, Devon Morris and Winthrop Graham.

Fagan competed for the Auburn Tigers track and field team in the NCAA.

== Achievements ==
Year	Competition	Venue	Position	Event	Notes
Representing Jamaica
1990	Goodwill Games	Seattle, United States	2nd	4 × 400 m relay	3:00.45
1991	Central American and Caribbean Championships	Xalapa, Mexico	1st	400 m	46.11
1991	Central American and Caribbean Championships	Xalapa, Mexico	3rd	4 × 400 m relay	3:08.14
1991	Pan American Games	Havana, Cuba	3rd	4 × 400 m relay	3:02.12
1991	World Championships	Tokyo, Japan	3rd	4 × 400 m relay	3:00.10
