= Jorge Valentín =

Cuban sprinter

Personal information
- Born: August 16, 1964 (age 61)

Sport
- Sport: Athletics
- Event: 400 metres

Jorge Valentín (born 16 August 1964) is a retired Cuban sprinter who specialised in the 400 metres. He won a gold medal in the 4 × 400 metres relay at the 1991 Pan American Games.

His personal best in the event is 45.19 seconds set in Santiago de Cuba in 1987.

== International competitions ==
Year	Competition	Venue	Position	Event	Notes
Representing Cuba
1986	Central American and Caribbean Games	Santiago, Dominican Republic	1st	4 × 400 m relay	3:02.41
1986	Ibero-American Championships	Havana, Cuba	2nd	4 × 400 m relay	3:09.09
1988	Ibero-American Championships	Mexico City, Mexico	5th	400 m	46.38
1988	Ibero-American Championships	Mexico City, Mexico	1st	4 × 400 m relay	2:59.71
1991	Pan American Games	Havana, Cuba	5th	400 m	46.03
1991	Pan American Games	Havana, Cuba	1st	4 × 400 m relay	3:01.93
1991	World Championships	Tokyo, Japan	8th	4 × 400 m relay	3:05.33
1992	Ibero-American Championships	Seville, Spain	4th	400 m	46.29
1992	Ibero-American Championships	Seville, Spain	1st	4 × 400 m relay	3:01.58
