= Jeff Reynolds (sprinter) =

American sprinter

Personal information
- Born: January 25, 1966 (age 60)
- Relative: Butch Reynolds (brother)
Medal record
Men's athletics
Representing United States
Pan American Games
Bronze medal – third place	1991 Havana	400 m
World Athletics Championships
Silver medal – second place	1991 Tokyo	4 × 400 m relay

Jeff Reynolds (born January 25, 1966) is an American former professional sprinter. He won a bronze medal in the 400 m at the 1991 Pan American Games, and a silver medal from running in the preliminary round of the 4 × 400 m relay at the 1991 World Championships in Athletics.

Reynolds was an All-American sprinter for the Kansas State Wildcats track and field team, finishing 3rd in the 400 meters at the 1989 NCAA Division I Indoor Track and Field Championships.

He is the younger brother of Butch Reynolds, who once held the world record in the 400 m. Butch teased his brother's racing, at one meet saying that Jeff "got out of the blocks as slow as a turtle."

== Major international competitions ==
Year	Competition	Venue	Position	Event	Notes
1988	Weltklasse Zurich	Zurich, Switzerland	6th (Race B)	400 m	45.54
1989	Athletissima	Lausanne, Switzerland	5th	400 m	45.75
1989	Bislett Games	Oslo, Norway	2nd	400 m	45.33
1989	Stockholm Bauhaus Athletics	Stockholm, Sweden	7th	400 m	46.03
1989	Weltklasse Zurich	Zurich, Switzerland	5th (Race B)	400 m	46.11
1990	Athletissima	Lausanne, Switzerland	5th	400 m	45.46
