= Michael Joseph (Belizean sprinter) =

Belizean sprinter

Personal information
- Nationality: Belizean
- Born: 29 September 1971 (age 54)

Sport
- Sport: Sprinting
- Event: 400 metres

Michael Angelo Joseph (born 29 September 1971) is a Belizean sprinter. He competed in the men's 400 metres at the 1992 Summer Olympics.
