= Danny Everett =

American former track and field athlete

Personal information
- Full name: Daniel Joseph Everett
- Nationality: American
- Born: November 1, 1966 (age 59) Van Alstyne, Texas, U.S.

Sport
- Sport: Running
- Event: Sprints
- College team: UCLA Bruins
- Club: Santa Monica Track Club
Medal record
Men's athletics
Representing the United States
Olympic Games
Gold medal – first place	1988 Seoul	4 × 400 m relay
Bronze medal – third place	1988 Seoul	400 m
World Championships
Gold medal – first place	1987 Rome	4 × 400 m relay
Silver medal – second place	1991 Tokyo	4 × 400 m relay
Bronze medal – third place	1991 Tokyo	400 m

Danny Everett (born November 1, 1966) is an American former track and field athlete who competed in sprinting events, specializing in the 400 metres. He won bronze medals in the 400 m at the 1988 Olympic Games and at the 1991 World Championships, and won gold medals in the 4 × 400 m relay at the 1987 World Championships and the 1988 Olympic Games. His 400 m best of 43.81 seconds when winning the 1992 US Olympic trials, moved him to second on the world all-time list and still ranks him 20th on the world all-time list (as of July 2026). As of December 2024, his time of 43.81 remains the track record for New Orleans.

== Early life ==
Everett was born in Van Alstyne, Texas, then moved to South Central Los Angeles as a child. Everett did not start running track until tenth grade at Fairfax High School, when the high school track coach encouraged him to try out for the team. In two short years, Everett cultivated his natural athletic talent and as a senior placed second in the 400 meters at the California State High School Track & Field championships.

After graduating from Fairfax, Danny attended UCLA. As a Bruin, Everett's track achievements included: NCAA champion in 400 meters and 1600 meter relay, three-time NCAA All-American, and two-time Pac-10 400 meter and 1600 meter relay champion. Everett was inducted into the UCLA Athletics Hall of Fame in 2003.

== Olympic teams ==
From 1987 to 1992, Everett qualified for the U.S. Olympic team where he won gold and bronze medals in the 1600 meter relay and 400 meters in the 1988 Olympic Games in Seoul, South Korea. Everett also won gold, silver and bronze medals at the World Championships in Rome, Italy in 1987 and in Tokyo, Japan in 1991. During his career, Everett set five world records in the 300 meters, 400 meters, 1600 meter relay and 4 × 200 meter. In 1992, Everett qualified for the U.S. Olympic Team, running the fastest Olympic qualifying time in U.S. history at 43.81 and at that time the second fastest time in history. Everett suffered a foot injury at the 1992 Olympic Games in Barcelona, Spain.

In 1990, Everett was the second fastest man over 200 metres, clocking 20.08 seconds in Norwalk on 16 June. The only man to run the 200 metres faster that year was fellow American Michael Johnson.

== Personal life ==
Everett and his wife Tiarzha Taylor live in Upper Ojai, California with their three children. He coaches track & field for the Ojai Roadrunners in Ojai. Everett has served as consultant for local athletic programs, and co-founded Precious Medals, a sports merchandising firm. Everett later attended the Los Angeles Culinary Institute and launched SoulFête, a culinary event series.
