= Athletics at the 1991 Pan American Games =

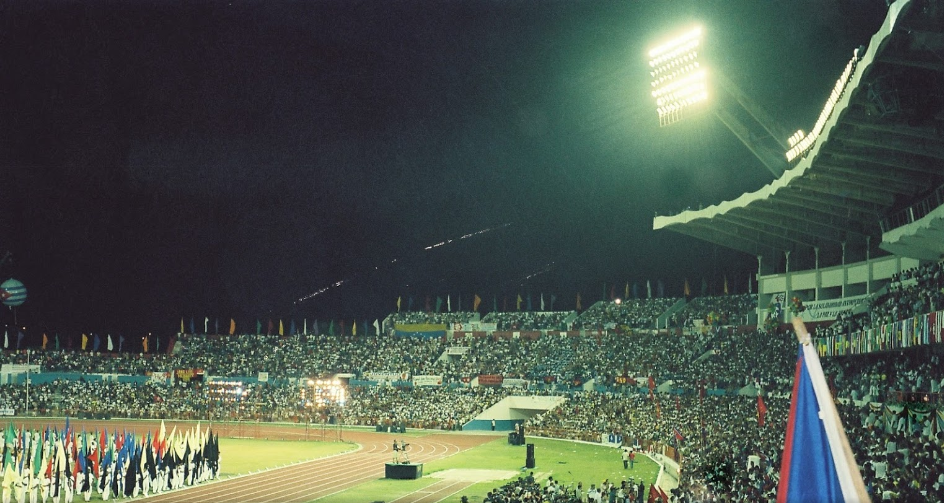
- Host venue (shown in 2013)
- Dates: 3–11 August
- Host city: Havana, Cuba
- Venue: Estadio Panamericano
- Level: Senior
- Events: 43
- Participation: 434 athletes from 34 nations

The athletics competition at the 1991 Pan American Games was held in Havana, Cuba.

== Medal summary ==
=== Men's events ===
| Event | Gold | | Silver | | Bronze | |
|---|---|---|---|---|---|---|
| 100 metres | Robson da Silva; Brazil | 10.32 | Andre Cason; United States | 10.35 | Jeff Williams; United States | 10.48 |
| 200 metres | Robson da Silva; Brazil | 20.15 | Kevin Little; United States | 20.63 | Félix Stevens; Cuba | 20.76 |
| 400 metres | Roberto Hernández; Cuba | 44.52 | Ian Morris; Trinidad and Tobago | 45.24 | Jeff Reynolds; United States | 45.81 |
| 800 metres | Ocky Clark; United States | 1:46.91 | Terril Davis; United States | 1:46.99 | Tommy Asinga; Suriname | 1:47.24 |
| 1500 metres | José Valente; Brazil | 3:42.90 | Bill Burke; United States | 3:43.04 | Dan Bertoia; Canada | 3:43.71 |
| 5000 metres | Arturo Barrios; Mexico | 13:34.67 | Ignacio Fragoso; Mexico | 13:35.83 | Antonio Silio; Argentina | 13:45.15 |
| 10,000 metres | Martín Pitayo; Mexico | 29:45.49 | Ángel Rodríguez; Cuba | 29:54.41 | Juan Linares; Cuba | 30:09.58 |
| Marathon | Alberto Cuba; Cuba | 2:19:27 | José Santana; Brazil | 2:19:29 | Radamés González; Cuba | 2:23:05 |
| 110 metres hurdles | Cletus Clark; United States | 13.71 | Alexis Sánchez; Cuba | 13.76 | Elbert Ellis; United States | 13.89 |
| 400 metres hurdles | Eronilde Nunes de Araújo; Brazil | 49.96 | McClinton Neal; United States | 50.05 | Torrance Zellner; United States | 50.21 |
| 3000 metres steeplechase | Adauto Domingues; Brazil | 8:36.01 | Ricardo Vera; Uruguay | 8:36.83 | Juan Ramón Conde; Cuba | 8:37.53 |
| 4 × 100 metres relay | Cuba; Jorge Aguilera; Leandro Peñalver; Félix Stevens; Joel Lamela | 39.08 | Canada; Everton Anderson; Mike Dwyer; Peter Ogilvie; Donovan Bailey | 39.95 | U.S. Virgin Islands; Derry Pemberton; Neville Hodge; Keith Smith; Kevin Robinson | 41.02 |
| 4 × 400 metres relay | Cuba; Agustín Pavó; Héctor Herrera; Jorge Valentín; Lázaro Martínez | 3:01.93 | United States; Clarence Daniel; Quincy Watts; Jeff Reynolds; Gabriel Luke | 3:02.02 | Jamaica; Michael Anderson; Howard Burnett; Seymour Fagan; Patrick O'Connor | 3:02.12 |
| 20 kilometres walk | Héctor José Moreno; Colombia | 1:24:56 | Joel Sánchez Guerrero; Mexico | 1:25:45 | Marcelo Palma; Brazil | 1:26:42 |
| 50 kilometres walk | Carlos Mercenario; Mexico | 4:03:09 | Miguel Ángel Rodríguez; Mexico | 4:04:06 | Edel Oliva; Cuba | 4:16:27 |
| High jump | Javier Sotomayor; Cuba | 2.35 | Troy Kemp; Bahamas | 2.32 | Hollis Conway; United States | 2.32 |
| Pole vault | Pat Manson; United States | 5.50 | Doug Wood; Canada | 5.35 | Ángel Luis García; Cuba | 5.20 |
| Long jump | Jaime Jefferson; Cuba | 8.26 | Llewellyn Starks; United States | 8.01 | Iván Pedroso; Cuba | 7.96 |
| Triple jump | Yoelbi Quesada; Cuba | 17.06 | Anísio Silva; Brazil | 16.72 | Wendell Lawrence; Bahamas | 16.69 |
| Shot put | Gert Weil; Chile | 19.47 | Paul Ruiz; Cuba | 19.30 | C.J. Hunter; United States | 19.08 |
| Discus throw | Anthony Washington; United States | 65.04 | Roberto Moya; Cuba | 63.92 | Juan Martínez; Cuba | 63.52 |
| Hammer throw | Jim Driscoll; United States | 72.78 | Jud Logan; United States | 70.32 | René Díaz; Cuba | 68.36 |
| Javelin throw | Ramón González; Cuba | 79.12 | Mike Barnett; United States | 77.40 | Luis Lucumí; Colombia | 77.38 |
| Decathlon | Pedro da Silva; Brazil | 7762 | Eugenio Balanqué; Cuba | 7726 | Sheldon Blockburger; United States | 7363 |

=== Women's events ===
| Event | Gold | | Silver | | Bronze | |
|---|---|---|---|---|---|---|
| 100 metres | Liliana Allen; Cuba | 11.39 | Chryste Gaines; United States | 11.46 | Beverly McDonald; Jamaica | 11.52 |
| 200 metres | Liliana Allen; Cuba | 23.11 | Ximena Restrepo; Colombia | 23.16 | Merlene Frazer; Jamaica | 23.48 |
| 400 metres | Ana Fidelia Quirot; Cuba | 49.61 | Ximena Restrepo; Colombia | 50.14 AR | Jearl Miles; United States | 50.82 |
| 800 metres | Ana Fidelia Quirot; Cuba | 1:58.71 | Alisa Hill; United States | 1:59.99 | Celeste Halliday; United States | 2:01.41 |
| 1500 metres | Alisa Hill; United States | 4:13.12 | Letitia Vriesde; Suriname | 4:16.75 | Sarah Howell; Canada | 4:17.55 |
| 3000 metres | Sabrina Dornhoefer; United States | 9:16.15 | María del Carmen Díaz; Mexico | 9:19.05 | Carmem de Oliveira; Brazil | 9:19.18 |
| 10,000 metres | María del Carmen Díaz; Mexico | 34:21.13 | Lisa Harvey; Canada | 34:25.52 | María Luisa Servín; Mexico | 34:55.94 |
| Marathon | Olga Appell; Mexico | 2:43:36 | Maribel Durruty; Cuba | 2:46:04 | Emperatriz Wilson; Cuba | 2:48:48 |
| 100 metres hurdles | Aliuska López; Cuba | 12.99 | Odalys Adams; Cuba | 13.06 | Arnita Myricks; United States | 13.23 |
| 400 metres hurdles | Lency Montelier; Cuba | 57.34 | Deon Hemmings; Jamaica | 57.54 | Tonja Buford; United States | 57.81 |
| 4 × 100 metres relay | Jamaica; Cheryl-Ann Phillips; Merlene Frazer; Beverly McDonald; Dahlia Duhaney | 43.79 | Cuba; Eusebia Riquelme; Idalmis Bonne; Julia Duporty; Liliana Allen | 44.31 | United States; Arnita Myricks; Anita Howard; LaMonda Miller; Chryste Gaines | 44.62 |
| 4 × 400 metres relay | United States; Natasha Kaiser; Tasha Downing; Maicel Malone; Jearl Miles | 3:24.21 | Cuba; Julia Duporty; Odalmis Limonta; Nancy McLeón; Ana Fidelia Quirot | 3:24.91 | Jamaica; Vivienne Spence-Gardner; Cathy Rattray-Williams; Sandie Richards; Inez Turner | 3:28.33 |
| 10,000 metres walk | Graciela Mendoza; Mexico | 46:41.56 | Debbi Lawrence; United States | 46:51.53 | Maricela Chávez; Mexico | 47:44.73 |
| High jump | Ioamnet Quintero; Cuba | 1.88 | María del Carmen García; Cuba | 1.85 | Jan Wohlschlag; United States | 1.80 |
| Long jump | Diane Guthrie-Gresham; Jamaica | 6.64 | Eloína Echevarría; Cuba | 6.60w | Julie Bright; United States | 6.53w |
| Shot put | Belsy Laza; Cuba | 18.87 | Connie Price-Smith; United States | 18.30 | Ramona Pagel; United States | 17.76 |
| Discus throw | Bárbara Hechevarría; Cuba | 63.50 | Hilda Ramos; Cuba | 63.38 | Lacy Barnes; United States | 60.32 |
| Javelin throw | Dulce García; Cuba | 64.78 | Donna Mayhew; United States | 58.44 | Herminia Bouza; Cuba | 56.70 |
| Heptathlon | DeDee Nathan; United States | 5778 | Sharon Hanson; United States | 5770 | Magalys García; Cuba | 5690 |

== Medal table ==
| Rank | Country | Gold | Silver | Bronze | Total |
| 1 | Cuba | 18 | 12 | 12 | 42 |
| 2 | United States | 9 | 15 | 16 | 40 |
| 3 | Mexico | 6 | 4 | 2 | 12 |
| 4 | Brazil | 6 | 2 | 2 | 10 |
| 5 | Jamaica | 2 | 1 | 4 | 7 |
| 6 | Colombia | 1 | 2 | 1 | 4 |
| 7 | Chile | 1 | 0 | 0 | 1 |
| 8 | Canada | 0 | 3 | 2 | 5 |
| 9 | Suriname | 0 | 1 | 1 | 2 |
| — | Bahamas | 0 | 1 | 1 | 2 |
| 11 | Uruguay | 0 | 1 | 0 | 1 |
| — | Trinidad and Tobago | 0 | 1 | 0 | 1 |
| 13 | Virgin Islands | 0 | 0 | 1 | 1 |
| — | Argentina | 0 | 0 | 1 | 1 |

== Participating nations ==
- Antigua and Barbuda (2)
- Argentina (12)
- Bahamas (8)
- Barbados (6)
- Belize (7)
- Bermuda (8)
- Bolivia (6)
- Brazil (21)
- British Virgin Islands (4)
- Canada (47)
- Chile (9)
- Colombia (12)
- Costa Rica (4)
- Cuba (75)
- Grenada (2)
- Guatemala (5)
- Guyana (3)
- Haiti (3)
- Honduras (2)
- Jamaica (29)
- Mexico (21)
- Nicaragua (4)
- Panama (3)
- Paraguay (1)
- Peru (3)
- Puerto Rico (10)
- Saint Vincent and the Grenadines (6)
- El Salvador (2)
- Suriname (2)
- Trinidad and Tobago (10)
- United States (84)
- Virgin Islands (10)
- Uruguay (7)
- Venezuela (6)

== See also ==
- 1991 in athletics (track and field)
