= Seibert Straughn =

Barbadian sprinter (born 1967)

Personal information
- Born: 31 October 1967 (age 58) Saint Philip, Barbados

Sport
- Sport: Track and field
- Club: Murray State Racers
Medal record
Representing Barbados
Central American and Caribbean Games
Silver medal – second place	1990 Mexico City	4x400m relay
CARIFTA Games Junior (U20)
Bronze medal – third place	1986 Les Abymes	400 m

Seibert Straughn (born 31 October 1967) is a retired Barbadian sprinter who specialized in the 400 metres.

He won the bronze medal at the 1989 Central American and Caribbean Championships. He also competed at the Olympic Games in 1988 and 1992 as well as the 1991 World Championships.

His personal best time was 45.61 seconds, achieved in May 1989 in Bridgetown.
