= Mike McLean (sprinter) =

Canadian sprinter (born 1970)

Michael McLean
Personal information
- Nationality: Canadian
- Born: 9 April 1970 (age 55) Kingstown, Saint Vincent and the Grenadines

Sport
- Sport: Sprinting
- Event: 400 metres

Michael McLean (born 9 April 1970) is a Canadian sprinter. He competed in the men's 400 metres at the 1992 Summer Olympics.
