= Howard Burnett (sprinter) =

Jamaican sprinter (born 1961)

Personal information
- Nationality: Jamaican
- Born: 8 March 1961 (age 65)
- Height: 193 cm (6 ft 4 in)
- Weight: 72 kg (159 lb)

Sport
- Sport: Athletics
- Event: 400m
- Club: NYIT Athletics
Medal record
Representing Jamaica
Olympic Games
Silver medal – second place	1988 Seoul	4x400m relay
World Championships
Bronze medal – third place	1991 Tokyo	4x400m relay
Commonwealth Games
Bronze medal – third place	1990 Auckland	4x400m relay
Pan American Games
Bronze medal – third place	1991 Havana	4x400m relay
Summer Universiade
Gold medal – first place	1989 Duisburg	4x400m relay
Central American and Caribbean Games
Gold medal – first place	1990 Mexico City	4x400m relay
Bronze medal – third place	1990 Mexico City	400m

Howard McNeal Burnett (born 8 March 1961) is a Jamaican retired male sprinter, who mainly competed in the men's 400 metres during his career. He is a one-time Olympian, making his only appearance in 1988 (Seoul, South Korea), when he won the silver medal with the men's 4 × 400 m relay team. He is an alumnus of NYIT.

Burnett won the British AAA Championships title in the 400 metres event at the 1990 AAA Championships.

== Achievements ==
Year	Competition	Venue	Position	Event	Notes
Representing Jamaica
1988	Olympic Games	Seoul, South Korea	2nd	4 × 400 m relay	3:00.30
1990	Commonwealth Games	Auckland, New Zealand	3rd	4 × 400 m relay	3:04.96
1990	Goodwill Games	Seattle, United States	2nd	4 × 400 m relay	3:00.45
1991	Pan American Games	Havana, Cuba	3rd	4 × 400 m relay	3:02.12
