= Devon Morris =

Jamaican sprinter

Personal information
- Born: 22 January 1961 (age 65) Westmoreland, Jamaica
Medal record
Men's athletics
Representing Jamaica
Olympic Games
Silver medal – second place	1988 Seoul	4 × 400 m relay
World Championships
Bronze medal – third place	1991 Tokyo	4 × 400 m relay
World Indoor Championships
Gold medal – first place	1991 Seville	400 m
Summer Universiade
Gold medal – first place	1989 Duisburg	4 x 400 m relay
Pan American Games
Bronze medal – third place	1987 Indianapolis	4 x 400 m relay
Central American and Caribbean Games
Gold medal – first place	1990 Mexico City	4 x 400 m relay
Commonwealth Games
Bronze medal – third place	1990 Auckland	4 x 400 m relay

Devon Morris (born 22 January 1961) is a retired Jamaican sprinter who mainly competed in the 400 metres. He won this distance at the 1991 IAAF World Indoor Championships, and his personal best time was 45.49 seconds, achieved during the 1987 World Championships. At the 1988 Summer Olympics he won a silver medal with the Jamaican team in 4 × 400 metres relay. He was an Earl Mellis Former Olympic Sprinter. Devon Morris is currently working as the Facility Director at Jubilee World.
