= Athletics at the 1985 Summer Universiade – Men's 100 metres =

The men's 100 metres event at the 1985 Summer Universiade was held at the Kobe Universiade Memorial Stadium in Kobe on 29 and 30 August 1985.

== Medalists ==
Gold	Silver	Bronze
Chidi Imoh; Nigeria	Andrés Simón; Cuba	Lee McNeill; United States

== Results ==
=== Heats ===
Wind:
Heat 3: -2.7 m/s, Heat 8: 0.0 m/s

Rank	Heat	Athlete	Nationality	Time	Notes
1	1	Bill Trott	Bermuda	10.81	Q
2	1	Jang Jae-keun	South Korea	10.90	Q
3	1	Oliver Daniels	Liberia	11.02	Q
3	1	Clifford Mamba	Swaziland	11.02	Q
4	1	Emilio Samayoa	Guatemala	11.13	q
5	1	F. Zayed	Kuwait	11.43	
6	1	B. Lema	Tanzania	11.67	
7	1	M. Mostafa	Sudan	12.24	
1	2	Arnaldo da Silva	Brazil	10.72	Q
2	2	Takale Tuna	Papua New Guinea	11.09	Q
4	2	A. Sghayer	Iraq	11.50	
5	2	S. Nsibandze	Swaziland	11.73	
6	2	Christian Gugler	Switzerland	11.79	
7	2	Tarek Mustapha Moussalli	Lebanon	11.81	
1	3	Chidi Imoh	Nigeria	10.62	Q
2	3	Shim Duk-sub	South Korea	10.70	Q
3	3	Werner Zaske	West Germany	10.71	Q
4	3	Paulo Curvelo	Portugal	10.95	q
6	3	D. Mwenja	Kenya	11.58	
7	3	S. El Agib	Sudan	12.71	
1	4	Andrés Simón	Cuba	10.64	Q
2	4	Nguyen Trung Hoa	Vietnam	11.02	Q
3	4	Atlee Mahorn	Canada	11.13	Q
4	4	Saidur Rahman Dawn	Bangladesh	11.49	
5	4	Leung Wing Kwong	Hong Kong	11.80	
1	5	Mike Morris	United States	10.59	Q
2	5	Hideyuki Arikawa	Japan	10.68	Q
3	5	Antônio dos Santos	Brazil	10.88	Q
4	5	Visut Watanasin	Thailand	11.05	q
1	6	Lee McNeill	United States	10.57	Q
2	6	Ricardo Chacón	Cuba	10.58	Q
3	6	Fritz-Werner Heer	West Germany	10.77	Q
4	6	René Mangold	Switzerland	10.95	q
5	6	Ronald Raborg	Peru	11.48	q
1	7	Dave Smith	Jamaica	10.75	Q
2	7	Mike Dwyer	Canada	10.85	Q
2	7	Roland Jokl	Austria	10.85	Q
3	7	Gervais Kirolo	Central African Republic	11.25	
4	7	A. Chambula	Zambia	11.67	
4	7	Arturo Leiva	Guatemala	11.67	
5	7	Jitendra Chaudhari	Nepal	11.76	
	7	István Nagy	Hungary	DNF	
1	8	Victor Edet	Nigeria	10.50	Q
2	8	Bruno Marie-Rose	France	10.56	Q
3	8	Koji Kurihara	Japan	10.71	Q
4	8	Luc Lenaerts	Belgium	10.86	q
5	8	V. Golea	Fiji	11.60	
6	8	Mohamad Ismail Bakaki	Afghanistan	12.56	

=== Quarterfinals ===
Wind:
Heat 1: -1.3 m/s, Heat 2: ? m/s, Heat 3: -1.0 m/s, Heat 4: 0.0 m/s

Rank	Heat	Athlete	Nationality	Time	Notes
1	1	Mike Morris	United States	10.38	Q
2	1	Ricardo Chacón	Cuba	10.42	Q
3	1	Arnaldo da Silva	Brazil	10.48	Q
4	1	Dave Smith	Jamaica	10.59	q
5	1	Paulo Curvelo	Portugal	10.90	
6	1	René Mangold	Switzerland	11.00	
7	1	Emilio Samayoa	Guatemala	11.01	
1	2	Shim Duk-sub	South Korea	10.63	Q
2	2	Hideyuki Arikawa	Japan	10.70	Q
3	2	Roland Jokl	Austria	10.77	Q
4	2	Visut Watanasin	Thailand	10.93	
5	2	Luc Lenaerts	Belgium	11.01	
6	2	Takale Tuna	Papua New Guinea	11.36	
7	2	Ronald Raborg	Peru	11.47	
1	3	Andrés Simón	Cuba	10.38	Q
2	3	Bruno Marie-Rose	France	10.55	Q
3	3	Mike Dwyer	Canada	10.62	Q
4	3	Werner Zaske	West Germany	10.70	
5	3	Bill Trott	Bermuda	10.74	
6	3	Antônio dos Santos	Brazil	10.74	
7	3	Nguyen Trung Hoa	Vietnam	11.06	
1	4	Chidi Imoh	Nigeria	10.28	Q
2	4	Lee McNeill	United States	10.40	Q
3	4	Atlee Mahorn	Canada	10.42	Q
4	4	Fritz-Werner Heer	West Germany	10.56	q
5	4	Jang Jae-keun	South Korea	10.59	q
6	4	Koji Kurihara	Japan	10.83	
7	4	Oliver Daniels	Liberia	10.83	
7	4	Clifford Mamba	Swaziland	10.83	

=== Semifinals ===
Wind:
Heat 1: +7.7 m/s, Heat 2: -1.7 m/s

Rank	Heat	Athlete	Nationality	Time	Notes
1	1	Andrés Simón	Cuba	9.97	Q
2	1	Arnaldo da Silva	Brazil	10.06	Q
3	1	Mike Morris	United States	10.11	Q
4	1	Atlee Mahorn	Canada	10.19	q
5	1	Dave Smith	Jamaica	10.23	q
6	2	Chidi Imoh	Nigeria	10.26	Q
7	1	Victor Edet	Nigeria	10.28	
8	1	Shim Duk-sub	South Korea	10.32	
9	2	Ricardo Chacón	Cuba	10.40	Q
10	2	Lee McNeill	United States	10.43	Q
11	2	Mike Dwyer	Canada	10.50	
12	2	Bruno Marie-Rose	France	10.50	
13	2	Jang Jae-keun	South Korea	10.63	
14	2	Fritz-Werner Heer	West Germany	10.65	
15	2	Hideyuki Arikawa	Japan	10.67	
	1	Roland Jokl	Austria	?	

=== Final ===
Wind: 0.0 m/s

Rank	Athlete	Nationality	Time	Notes
1st place, gold medalist(s)	Chidi Imoh	Nigeria	10.22	
2nd place, silver medalist(s)	Andrés Simón	Cuba	10.28	
3rd place, bronze medalist(s)	Lee McNeill	United States	10.33	
4	Arnaldo da Silva	Brazil	10.36	
5	Atlee Mahorn	Canada	10.39	
6	Mike Morris	United States	10.41	
7	Ricardo Chacón	Cuba	10.43	
8	Dave Smith	Jamaica	10.56	
