= Athletics at the 1985 Summer Universiade – Men's 200 metres =

The men's 200 metres event at the 1985 Summer Universiade was held at the Kobe Universiade Memorial Stadium in Kobe on 31 August and 2 September 1985.

== Medalists ==
Gold	Silver	Bronze
Leandro Peñalver; Cuba	Atlee Mahorn; Canada	Jang Jae-keun; South Korea

== Results ==
=== Heats ===
Wind:
Heat 4: -2.9 m/s

Rank	Heat	Athlete	Nationality	Time	Notes
1	6	Leandro Peñalver	Cuba	21.17	Q
2	1	Jang Jae-keun	South Korea	21.31	Q
3	1	István Nagy	Hungary	21.31	Q
4	2	Ikpoto Eseme	Nigeria	21.36	Q
5	5	Lorenzo Daniel	United States	21.38	Q
6	7	Atlee Mahorn	Canada	21.39	Q
7	3	Elliott Quow	United States	21.50	Q
8	1	Takale Tuna	Papua New Guinea	21.63	Q
9	3	Sergio Querol	Cuba	21.66	Q
9	7	Dave Smith	Jamaica	21.66	Q
9	8	Peter Klein	West Germany	21.66	Q
12	1	Luc Lenaerts	Belgium	21.68	q
13	5	Jun Asaba	Japan	21.77	Q
13	7	Kenji Yamauchi	Japan	21.77	Q
15	8	Shim Duk-sub	South Korea	21.78	Q
16	3	Mike Dwyer	Canada	21.83	Q
17	3	Pongsak Watcharakupt	Thailand	21.83	q
18	8	Timothy Arinze	Nigeria	21.85	Q
19	8	A. Sghayer	Iraq	21.85	q
20	4	Roland Jokl	Austria	21.99	Q
21	1	Nguyen Trung Hoa	Vietnam	22.01	q
22	4	Mark Rosenberg	Australia	22.17	Q
23	4	Oliver Daniels	Liberia	22.32	Q
24	4	Paulo Curvelo	Portugal	22.32	q
25	3	Jorge Burgos	Mexico	22.41	q
26	6	Emilio Samayoa	Guatemala	22.43	Q
27	6	Luis Karin Toledo	Mexico	22.64	Q
28	3	Gervais Kirolo	Central African Republic	22.66	q
29	5	F. Zayed	Kuwait	22.80	Q
30	2	Saidur Rahman Dawn	Bangladesh	22.93	Q
31	7	B. Lema	Tanzania	23.19	q
32	6	Gusztáv Menczer	Hungary	23.31	
33	5	Clifford Mamba	Swaziland	23.36	
34	2	Arnaldo da Silva	Brazil	23.42	Q
35	3	V. Golea	Fiji	23.50	
36	6	A. Chambula	Zambia	23.71	
37	8	Jitendra Chaudhari	Nepal	23.77	
38	7	P. Baysahwala	Liberia	23.90	
39	6	S. Nsibandze	Swaziland	24.01	
40	2	Leung Wing Kwong	Hong Kong	24.04	
41	1	Tarik Ahmad	Afghanistan	24.34	
42	2	S. El Agib	Sudan	25.89	
	1	M. Mostafa	Sudan	DQ	

=== Quarterfinals ===
Wind:
Heat 2: +2.5 m/s, Heat 3: -2.5 m/s

Rank	Heat	Athlete	Nationality	Time	Notes
1	2	Leandro Peñalver	Cuba	20.53	Q
2	2	Dave Smith	Jamaica	20.80	Q
3	4	Elliott Quow	United States	20.92	Q
4	2	Arnaldo da Silva	Brazil	20.99	Q
5	3	Ikpoto Eseme	Nigeria	21.01	Q
6	4	István Nagy	Hungary	21.05	Q
7	3	Lorenzo Daniel	United States	21.07	Q
8	4	Shim Duk-sub	South Korea	21.12	Q
9	4	Peter Klein	West Germany	21.12	q
10	2	Mike Dwyer	Canada	21.28	q
11	1	Jang Jae-keun	South Korea	21.34	Q
12	1	Roland Jokl	Austria	21.35	Q
13	2	Timothy Arinze	Nigeria	21.48	q
14	1	Atlee Mahorn	Canada	21.60	Q
15	1	Sergio Querol	Cuba	21.62	q
16	3	Jun Asaba	Japan	21.67	Q
17	4	Pongsak Watcharakupt	Thailand	21.74	
18	2	Emilio Samayoa	Guatemala	21.75	
19	3	Mark Rosenberg	Australia	21.81	
20	1	Kenji Yamauchi	Japan	21.82	
20	3	Luc Lenaerts	Belgium	21.82	
22	2	Jorge Burgos	Mexico	21.88	
23	4	Oliver Daniels	Liberia	21.95	
24	2	Takale Tuna	Papua New Guinea	22.03	
25	3	Nguyen Trung Hoa	Vietnam	22.14	
26	4	Luis Karin Toledo	Mexico	22.18	
27	1	Paulo Curvelo	Portugal	22.25	
28	3	A. Sghayer	Iraq	22.45	
29	4	B. Lema	Tanzania	22.61	
30	1	Gervais Kirolo	Central African Republic	22.66	
31	3	F. Zayed	Kuwait	22.77	
32	1	Saidur Rahman Dawn	Bangladesh	23.09	

=== Semifinals ===
Rank	Heat	Athlete	Nationality	Time	Notes
1	1	Leandro Peñalver	Cuba	21.02	Q
2	2	Jang Jae-keun	South Korea	21.08	Q
3	2	István Nagy	Hungary	21.13	Q
4	2	Dave Smith	Jamaica	21.16	Q
5	2	Ikpoto Eseme	Nigeria	21.17	q
6	1	Arnaldo da Silva	Brazil	21.18	Q
7	2	Elliott Quow	United States	21.29	q
8	1	Atlee Mahorn	Canada	21.37	Q
9	1	Lorenzo Daniel	United States	21.37	
10	1	Roland Jokl	Austria	21.39	
11	2	Sergio Querol	Cuba	21.47	
12	1	Peter Klein	West Germany	21.56	
13	1	Shim Duk-sub	South Korea	21.57	
14	2	Mike Dwyer	Canada	22.06	
15	1	Timothy Arinze	Nigeria	22.20	
	2	Jun Asaba	Japan	?	

=== Final ===
Wind: +0.1 m/s

Rank	Athlete	Nationality	Time	Notes
1st place, gold medalist(s)	Leandro Peñalver	Cuba	20.57	
2nd place, silver medalist(s)	Atlee Mahorn	Canada	20.65	
3rd place, bronze medalist(s)	Jang Jae-keun	South Korea	20.78	
4	István Nagy	Hungary	20.90	
5	Arnaldo da Silva	Brazil	20.90	
6	Dave Smith	Jamaica	20.92	
7	Ikpoto Eseme	Nigeria	20.98	
	Elliott Quow	United States	DNF	
