= Athletics at the 1985 Summer Universiade – Men's 4 × 100 metres relay =

The men's 4 × 100 metres relay event at the 1985 Summer Universiade was held at the Kobe Universiade Memorial Stadium in Kobe on 3 and 4 September 1986.

== Results ==
=== Heats ===
Rank	Heat	Nation	Athletes	Time	Notes
1	2	Cuba	Ricardo Chacón, Leandro Peñalver, Sergio Querol, Andrés Simón	39.25	Q
2	1	United States	Lee McNeill, Thomas Jefferson, Lorenzo Daniel, Mike Morris	39.45	Q
3	1	France	Bruno Dufernez, Jean-Jacques Boussemart, Thierry François, Bruno Marie-Rose	39.64	Q
4	2	Nigeria	Sunday Uti, Victor Edet, Innocent Egbunike, Ikpoto Eseme	39.66	Q
5	2	West Germany	Jürgen Schoch, Werner Zaske, Fritz-Werner Heer, Peter Klein	39.66	Q
6	1	Canada	Rick Jones, Mike Dwyer, Cyprian Enweani, Atlee Mahorn	39.69	Q
7	1	South Korea	Kim Bok-sub, Shim Duk-sub, Sung Nak-gun, Jang Jae-keun	39.89	q
8	1	Japan	Jun Asaba, Koji Kurihara, Hideyuki Arikawa, Satoshi Yonai	40.03	q
9	2	Brazil	Antônio dos Santos, Arnaldo da Silva, Antônio Ferreira, Pedro Chiamulera	40.22	
10	1	Uganda	L. Mutyaba, Fred Lwanga, Andrew Meya, F. Okoth	42.48	
11	1	Swaziland	Clifford Mamba, S. Khumalo, K. Maziya, S. Nsibandze	43.51	

=== Final ===
Rank	Nation	Athletes	Time	Notes
1st place, gold medalist(s)	Cuba	Ricardo Chacón, Leandro Peñalver, Sergio Querol, Andrés Simón	38.76	
2nd place, silver medalist(s)	Canada	Rick Jones, Mike Dwyer, Cyprian Enweani, Atlee Mahorn	39.07	
3rd place, bronze medalist(s)	United States	Lee McNeill, Thomas Jefferson, Keith Talley, Mike Morris	39.15	
4	Nigeria	Sunday Uti, Victor Edet, Innocent Egbunike, Chidi Imoh	39.27	
5	South Korea	Kim Bok-sub, Shim Duk-sub, Sung Nak-gun, Jang Jae-keun	39.74	
6	Japan	Jun Asaba, Satoshi Yonai, Hideyuki Arikawa, Koji Kurihara	39.93	
	West Germany	Jürgen Schoch, Werner Zaske, Fritz-Werner Heer, Peter Klein	DNF	
	France	Bruno Dufernez, Jean-Jacques Boussemart, Thierry François, Bruno Marie-Rose	DNF	
