= Athletics at the 1985 Summer Universiade – Men's 4 × 400 metres relay =

The men's 4 × 400 metres relay event at the 1985 Summer Universiade was held at the Kobe Universiade Memorial Stadium in Kobe on 4 September 1985.

== Results ==
Rank	Nation	Athletes	Time	Notes
1st place, gold medalist(s)	Cuba	Lázaro Martínez, Leandro Peñalver, Roberto Ramos, Roberto Hernández	3:02.20	
2nd place, silver medalist(s)	Soviet Union	Tagir Zemskov, Sergey Kutsebo, Yevgeniy Lomtyev, Vladimir Prosin	3:02.66	
3rd place, bronze medalist(s)	United States	Clarence Daniel, LeRoy Dixson, Dale Laverty, Cedric Vaughans	3:02.68	
4	Nigeria	Sunday Uti, Moses Ugbisien, Innocent Egbunike, Henry Amike	3:03.16	
5	Canada	John Graham, Lloyd Guss, Tim Bethune, Andre Smith	3:03.83	
6	Japan	Hiromitsu Suzuki, Takeo Suzuki, Kenji Yamauchi, Senja Suzuki	3:05.09	
7	Hungary	István Takács, Gusztáv Menczer, István Nagy, István Simon-Balla	3:07.94	
8	Puerto Rico	David Montañez, Wilfredo Santiago, Elmer Williams, Javier Andrade	3:15.14	
