= Athletics at the 1988 Summer Olympics – Men's 200 metres =

Men's 200 metres at the Games of the XXIV Olympiad
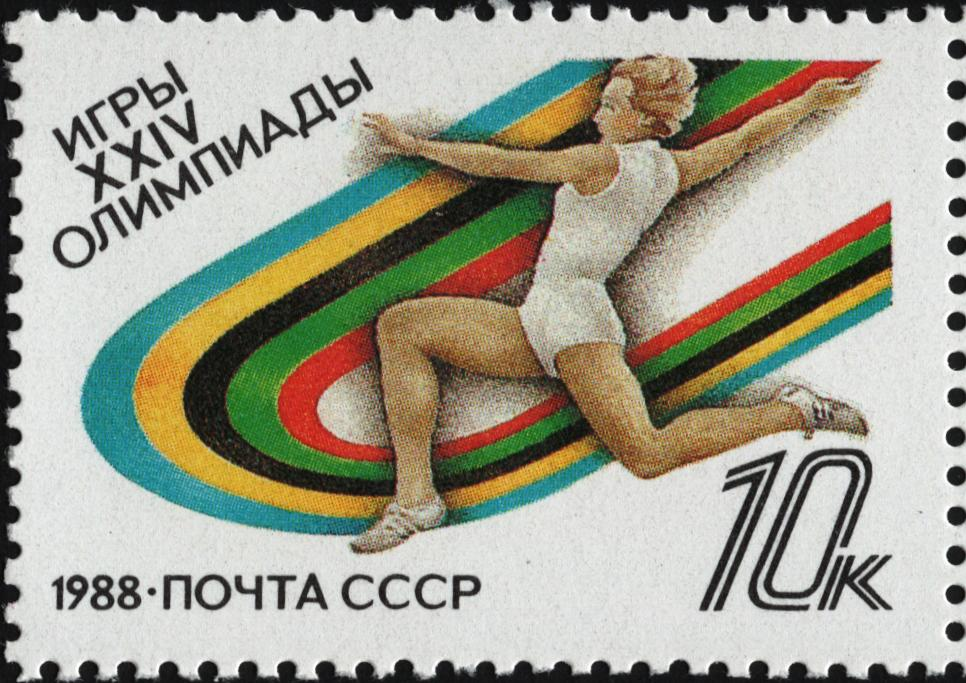
- Soviet stamp commemorating 1988 Olympic athletics
- Venue: Olympic Stadium
- Dates: 26 September 1988 (heats and quarterfinals); 28 September 1988 (semifinals and final)
- Competitors: 72 from 59 nations
- Winning time: 19.75 OR

Medalists
1st place, gold medalist(s)		Joe DeLoach; United States
2nd place, silver medalist(s)		Carl Lewis; United States
3rd place, bronze medalist(s)		Robson da Silva; Brazil

The men's 200 metres at the 1988 Summer Olympics in Seoul, South Korea had an entry list of 72 competitors from 59 nations, with ten qualifying heats (72), five quarterfinal races (40) and two semifinals (16), before the final (8) took off on Wednesday September 28, 1988. The maximum number of athletes per nation had been set at 3 since the 1930 Olympic Congress. The event was won by Joe DeLoach of the United States, beating his teammate and defending champion Carl Lewis by 0.04 seconds in the final. The defeat ended Lewis's hopes of repeating his 1984 quadruple, despite running the final under his own Olympic record time. It was the United States' 14th victory in the men's 200 metres. Lewis was the seventh man to win multiple medals in the event, matching Andy Stanfield for the best result to that point (a gold and a silver). Robson da Silva earned Brazil's first medal in the event with his bronze.

== Background ==
This was the 20th appearance of the event, which was not held at the first Olympics in 1896 but has been on the program ever since. Three of the eight finalists from the 1984 Games returned: gold medalist Carl Lewis of the United States, fifth-place finisher Ralf Lübke of West Germany, and seventh-place finisher Pietro Mennea of Italy. Mennea was competing in his fifth Games in this event, having won bronze in 1972, finished fourth in 1976, and won gold in 1980 previously. Lewis was attempting to repeat his 1984 quadruple of winning the 100 metres, 200 metres, long jump, and 4×100 metres relay (and had started well on that goal, winning the 100 and the long jump). He had placed second in the U.S. trials to Joe DeLoach in this event, however, and the competition between the two was expected to be tight. Nobody else running the event was thought to be close to the American pair.

Burkina Faso, Chinese Taipei, the Maldives, Saint Vincent and the Grenadines, South Yemen, Tonga, Vanuatu, and Vietnam each made their debut in the event. The United States made its 19th appearance, most of any nation, having missed only the boycotted 1980 Games.

== Competition format ==
The competition used the four round format introduced in 1920: heats, quarterfinals, semifinals, and a final. The "fastest loser" system introduced in 1960 was used in the heats and quarterfinals.

There were 10 heats of 7 or 8 runners each, with the top 3 men in each advancing to the quarterfinals along with the next 10 fastest overall. The quarterfinals consisted of 5 heats of 8 athletes each; the 3 fastest men in each heat and the next fastest overall advanced to the semifinals. There were 2 semifinals, each with 8 runners. The top 4 athletes in each semifinal advanced. The final had 8 runners. The races were run on a 400-metre track.

== Records ==
These were the standing world and Olympic records (in seconds) prior to the 1988 Summer Olympics.

World record	Pietro Mennea (ITA)	19.72	Mexico City, Mexico	12 September 1979
Olympic record	Carl Lewis (USA)	19.80	Los Angeles, United States	8 August 1984

Joe DeLoach and Carl Lewis both finished the final under the Olympic record time; DeLoach's 19.75 seconds became the new record, while Lewis's 19.79 seconds was good for silver.

== Schedule ==
All times are Korea Standard Time adjusted for daylight savings (UTC+10)

Date	Time	Round
Monday, 26 September 1988	11:05; 14:00	Heats; Quarterfinals
Wednesday, 28 September 1988	13:40; 16:00	Semifinals; Final

== Results ==
=== Heats ===
First 3 from each heat (Q) and the next 10 fastest (q) qualified for the quarterfinals.

Rank	Heat	Athlete	Nation	Time	Notes
1	2	Gilles Quénéhervé	France	20.55	Q
1	3	Atlee Mahorn	Canada	20.55	Q
3	1	Roy Martin	United States	20.65	Q
3	8	Cyprian Enweani	Canada	20.65	Q
5	10	Stefano Tilli	Italy	20.68	Q
6	8	Daniel Sangouma	France	20.70	Q
7	10	Carl Lewis	United States	20.72	Q
8	10	Olapade Adeniken	Nigeria	20.77	Q
9	6	Kennedy Ondiek	Kenya	20.79	Q
10	3	Ralf Lübke	West Germany	20.81	Q
11	8	Patrick Stevens	Belgium	20.84	Q
12	8	Norbert Dobeleit	West Germany	20.86	q
13	4	John Regis	Great Britain	20.90	Q
14	6	Troy Douglas	Bermuda	20.91	Q
15	4	Clive Wright	Jamaica	20.94	Q
16	1	Michael Rosswess	Great Britain	20.95	Q
17	2	Kenji Yamauchi	Japan	20.98	Q
17	5	Joe DeLoach	United States	20.98	Q
17	6	Attila Kovács	Hungary	20.98	Q
20	10	John Myles-Mills	Ghana	21.04	q
21	7	Linford Christie	Great Britain	21.05	Q
22	5	Mark Garner	Australia	21.09	Q
23	5	Edgardo Guilbe	Puerto Rico	21.09	Q
24	2	Iziaq Adeyanju	Nigeria	21.10	Q
24	6	Pietro Mennea	Italy	21.10	q
26	7	Bruno Marie-Rose	France	21.11	Q
27	9	Robson da Silva	Brazil	21.12	Q
28	10	Mostefa-Kamel Selmi	Algeria	21.24	q
29	2	Jang Jae-keun	South Korea	21.27	q
30	5	Andreas Berger	Austria	21.29	q
31	9	Luís Barroso	Portugal	21.31	Q
32	1	Harouna Pale	Burkina Faso	21.33	Q
32	8	Li Feng	China	21.33	q
32	9	Jimmy Flemming	Virgin Islands	21.33	Q
35	1	Nchinda Samuel-Kaya	Cameroon	21.45	q
35	7	Courtney Brown	Canada	21.45	Q
37	2	Lee Shiunn-Long	Chinese Taipei	21.53	q
38	8	Ousmane Diarra	Mali	21.55	q
39	3	Oliver Daniels	Liberia	21.59	Q
40	1	Henri Ndinga	Republic of the Congo	21.66	
41	1	Fabian Muyaba	Zimbabwe	21.66	
42	4	Ibrahima Tamba	Senegal	21.68	Q
43	3	Leung Wing Kwong	Hong Kong	21.69	
44	7	Luís Cunha	Portugal	21.72	
45	4	Issa Alassane Ousséni	Benin	21.74	
46	6	Lindel Hodge	British Virgin Islands	21.78	
47	3	Sunday Olweny	Uganda	21.79	
48	6	Abdullah Al-Khalidi	Oman	21.82	
49	2	Aouf Abdul Rahman Youssef	Iraq	21.88	
49	6	André François	Saint Vincent and the Grenadines	21.88	
51	3	Muhammad Afzal	Pakistan	21.89	
52	2	Takale Tuna	Papua New Guinea	21.95	
53	5	Henriko Atkins	Barbados	21.98	
54	10	Jerry Jeremiah	Vanuatu	22.01	
55	1	Markus Büchel	Liechtenstein	22.02	
56	3	Mohamed Fahd Al-Bishi	Saudi Arabia	22.09	
57	8	Abdullah Ali Ahmed	Libya	22.11	
58	7	Carlos Moreno	Chile	22.13	
59	9	Alexandre Yougbare	Burkina Faso	22.14	
60	7	Odia Silweya	Malawi	22.24	
61	9	Gustavo Envela Mahua	Equatorial Guinea	22.33	
62	4	Maloni Bole	Fiji	22.44	
63	7	Peauope Suli	Tonga	22.49	
64	1	Mohamed Shah Alam	Bangladesh	22.52	
65	4	Claude Roumain	Haiti	22.60	
65	10	Howard Lindsay	Antigua and Barbuda	22.60	
67	8	Nguyễn Đình Minh	Vietnam	22.65	
68	5	Robert Loua	Guinea	22.78	
69	9	Benny Kgarametso	Botswana	22.79	
70	2	Sahim Saleh Mehdi	South Yemen	22.95	
71	6	Ismail Asif	Maldives	23.17	
—	9	Gaspar Fernandes	Angola	DSQ	
—	4	Samuel Birch	Liberia	DNS	
—	5	Simon Kipkemboi	Kenya	DNS	
—	7	Boeviyoulou Lawson	Togo	DNS	

=== Quarterfinals ===
==== Quarterfinal 1 ====
Rank	Athlete	Nation	Time	Notes
1	Carl Lewis	United States	20.57	Q
2	John Regis	Great Britain	20.61	Q
3	Cyprian Enweani	Canada	20.62	Q
4	Edgardo Guilbe	Puerto Rico	20.73	q
5	Kenji Yamauchi	Japan	20.94	
6	Jimmy Flemming	Virgin Islands	21.23	
7	Moustafa Kamel Salmi	Algeria	21.26	
8	Ousmane Diarra	Mali	21.46	

==== Quarterfinal 2 ====
Rank	Athlete	Nation	Time	Notes
1	Bruno Marie-Rose	France	20.48	Q
2	Roy Martin	United States	20.54	Q
3	Troy Douglas	Bermuda	20.70	Q
4	Kennedy Ondiek	Kenya	20.79	
5	Attila Kovács	Hungary	21.19	
6	Lee Shiunn-Long	Chinese Taipei	21.34	
7	Harouna Pale	Burkina Faso	21.35	
—	Pietro Mennea	Italy	DNS	

==== Quarterfinal 3 ====
Rank	Athlete	Nation	Time	Notes
1	Linford Christie	Great Britain	20.49	Q
2	Atlee Mahorn	Canada	20.59	Q
3	Ralf Lübke	West Germany	20.80	Q
4	Luís Barroso	Portugal	20.81	
5	Patrick Stevens	Belgium	20.94	
6	John Myles-Mills	Ghana	20.95	
7	Andreas Berger	Austria	21.40	
8	Ibrahima Tamba	Senegal	21.93	

==== Quarterfinal 4 ====
Rank	Athlete	Nation	Time	Notes
1	Joe DeLoach	United States	20.56	Q
2	Gilles Quénéhervé	France	20.77	Q
3	Olapade Adeniken	Nigeria	20.92	Q
4	Norbert Dobeleit	West Germany	20.98	
5	Mark Garner	Australia	21.08	
6	Jang Jae-Geun	South Korea	21.35	
7	Li Feng	China	21.38	
8	Oliver Daniels	Liberia	22.25	

==== Quarterfinal 5 ====
Rank	Athlete	Nation	Time	Notes
1	Robson da Silva	Brazil	20.41	Q
2	Stefano Tilli	Italy	20.67	Q
3	Michael Rosswess	Great Britain	20.74	Q
4	Daniel Sangouma	France	20.81	
5	Clive Wright	Jamaica	20.87	
6	Isiag Adeyanju	Nigeria	21.01	
7	Courtney Brown	Canada	21.18	
8	Samuel Nchinda-Kaya	Cameroon	21.39	

=== Semifinals ===
==== Semifinal 1 ====
Rank	Athlete	Nation	Time	Notes
1	Carl Lewis	United States	20.23	Q
2	Robson da Silva	Brazil	20.28	Q
3	Atlee Mahorn	Canada	20.43	Q
4	Gilles Quénéhervé	France	20.54	Q
5	Stefano Tilli	Italy	20.59	
6	Roy Martin	United States	20.62	
7	John Regis	Great Britain	20.69	
8	Ralf Lübke	West Germany	21.23	

==== Semifinal 2 ====
Rank	Athlete	Nation	Time	Notes
1	Joe DeLoach	United States	20.06	Q
2	Linford Christie	Great Britain	20.33	Q
3	Bruno Marie-Rose	France	20.50	Q
4	Michael Rosswess	Great Britain	20.51	Q
5	Cyprian Enweani	Canada	20.57	
6	Olapade Adeniken	Nigeria	20.67	
7	Edgardo Guilbe	Puerto Rico	20.77	
8	Troy Douglas	Bermuda	20.84	

=== Final ===
Carl Lewis' time of 19.79 seconds was the fastest non-winning time until the 1996 Olympic final.

Rank	Athlete	Nation	Time	Notes
1st place, gold medalist(s)	Joe DeLoach	United States	19.75	OR
2nd place, silver medalist(s)	Carl Lewis	United States	19.79	
3rd place, bronze medalist(s)	Robson da Silva	Brazil	20.04	
4	Linford Christie	Great Britain	20.09	NR
5	Atlee Mahorn	Canada	20.39	
6	Gilles Quénéhervé	France	20.40	
7	Michael Rosswess	Great Britain	20.51	
8	Bruno Marie-Rose	France	20.58	

== See also ==
- 1984 Men's Olympic 200 metres (Los Angeles)
- 1986 Men's European Championships 200 metres (Stuttgart)
- 1987 Men's World Championships 200 metres (Rome)
- 1990 Men's European Championships 200 metres (Split)
- 1991 Men's World Championships 200 metres (Tokyo)
- 1992 Men's Olympic 200 metres (Barcelona)
