= Athletics at the 1985 Summer Universiade – Men's 400 metres =

The men's 400 metres event at the 1985 Summer Universiade was held at the Kobe Universiade Memorial Stadium in Kobe on 30 and 31 August.

== Medalists ==
Gold	Silver	Bronze
Innocent Egbunike; Nigeria	Roberto Hernández; Cuba	Sunday Uti; Nigeria

== Results ==
=== Heats ===
Held on 30 August

Rank	Heat	Athlete	Nationality	Time	Notes
1	7	Roberto Hernández	Cuba	45.55	Q
3	6	Sunday Uti	Nigeria	46.15	Q
4	7	Innocent Egbunike	Nigeria	46.41	Q
5	4	Susumu Takano	Japan	46.47	Q
6	2	Clarence Daniel	United States	46.55	Q
7	6	Lázaro Martínez	Cuba	46.59	Q
8	7	Andre Smith	Canada	46.65	Q
9	4	Leroy Dixon	United States	46.76	Q
10	6	Gusztáv Menczer	Hungary	46.95	Q
11	2	Antonio Sánchez	Spain	47.01	Q
12	7	Wilson dos Santos	Brazil	47.10	q
13	1	Vladimir Prosin	Soviet Union	47.13	Q
14	6	Tim Bethune	Canada	47.14	q
15	3	Marek Sira	Poland	47.35	Q
16	1	Oddur Sigurðsson	Iceland	47.43	Q
17	5	Mark Rosenberg	Australia	47.49	Q
18	7?	Benjamín González	Spain	47.50	q
19	1	Luis Karin Toledo	Mexico	47.52	Q
20	2	Jorge Burgos	Mexico	47.61	Q
21	3	Takeo Suzuki	Japan	47.71	Q
22	5	Yevgeniy Lomtyev	Soviet Union	47.72	Q
23	2	Takale Tuna	Papua New Guinea	48.17	
24	6	Fred Lwanga	Uganda	48.22	
25	5	Slobodan Popović	Yugoslavia	48.26	Q
26	3	Z. Shihan	Iraq	48.84	Q
27	4	Lee Davis	Jamaica	49.07	Q
28	1	Saïd M'hand	Morocco	49.15	
29	2	Syed Meesaq Rizvi	Pakistan	49.27	
30	1	Felix Haas	Switzerland	49.46	
31	4	Sándor Vasvári	Hungary	49.89	
32	3	V. Golea	Fiji	51.53	
33	5	Arturo Leiva	Guatemala	51.98	
34	3	Mohamed El Moctar	Mauritania	53.24	
35	5	Tarik Ahmad	Afghanistan	56.73	
36	4	M. Luveniyali	Fiji	57.74	

=== Semifinals ===
Held on 31 August

Rank	Heat	Athlete	Nationality	Time	Notes
1	3	Innocent Egbunike	Nigeria	45.19	Q
2	3	Susumu Takano	Japan	45.30	Q, NR
3	2	Roberto Hernández	Cuba	45.34	Q
4	2	Vladimir Prosin	Soviet Union	45.66	Q
5	3	Antonio Sánchez	Spain	45.77	q
6	3	Gusztáv Menczer	Hungary	45.81	q
7	1	Leroy Dixon	United States	45.92	Q
8	3	Yevgeniy Lomtyev	Soviet Union	45.93	
9	2	Clarence Daniel	United States	45.96	
10	1	Sunday Uti	Nigeria	46.09	Q
11	2	Andre Smith	Canada	46.65	
12	3	Mark Rosenberg	Australia	46.72	
13	3	Slobodan Popović	Yugoslavia	46.74	
14	1	Lázaro Martínez	Cuba	46.88	
14	3	Oddur Sigurðsson	Iceland	46.88	
16	1	Wilson dos Santos	Brazil	46.92	
17	2	Marek Sira	Poland	47.04	
18	2	Takeo Suzuki	Japan	47.57	
19	1	Benjamín González	Spain	47.63	
20	1	Tim Bethune	Canada	47.75	
21	1	Jorge Burgos	Mexico	47.75	
22	2	Luis Karin Toledo	Mexico	47.85	
23	1	Z. Shihan	Iraq	48.44	
24	2	Lee Davis	Jamaica	49.24	

=== Final ===
Held on 31 August

Rank	Athlete	Nationality	Time	Notes
1st place, gold medalist(s)	Innocent Egbunike	Nigeria	45.10	
2nd place, silver medalist(s)	Roberto Hernández	Cuba	45.41	
3rd place, bronze medalist(s)	Sunday Uti	Nigeria	45.58	
4	Gusztáv Menczer	Hungary	46.06	
5	Leroy Dixon	United States	46.20	
6	Vladimir Prosin	Soviet Union	46.49	
7	Antonio Sánchez	Spain	46.50	
	Susumu Takano	Japan	DNF	
