= Athletics at the Friendship Games – Men's 4 × 400 metres relay =

The men's 4 × 400 metres relay event at the Friendship Games was held on 18 August 1984 at the Grand Arena of the Central Lenin Stadium in Moscow, Soviet Union.

== Results ==
Rank	Nation	Competitors	Time	Notes
1st place, gold medalist(s)	Soviet Union	Sergey Lovachev, Yevgeniy Lomtev, Aleksandr Kurochkin, Viktor Markin	3:00.16	NR
2nd place, silver medalist(s)	East Germany	Carlo Niestädt, Mathias Schersing, Thomas Schönlebe, Jens Carlowitz	3:00.47	
3rd place, bronze medalist(s)	Cuba	Lázaro Martínez, Carlos Reyte, Roberto Ramos, Alberto Juantorena	3:04.76	
4	Czechoslovakia	Miroslav Púchovský, Petr Břečka, Dušan Malovec, Ján Tomko	3:05.69	
5	Poland	Robert Kseniak, Ryszard Ostrowski, Ryszard Szparak, Andrzej Stępień	3:06.03	
6	Hungary	Gusztáv Menczer, Pál Bankó, István Takács, István Csabo	3:06.28	
7	Bulgaria	Dimitar Rangelov, Toma Tomov, Dinko Penev, Bozhidar Konstantinov	3:26.13	
8	South Yemen	Mohammed Samanter, M. Daud, A. Zakir, Muntaser Ali Qassim	3:29.75	

== See also ==
- Athletics at the 1984 Summer Olympics – Men's 4 × 400 metres relay
