= Athletics at the 1987 Pan American Games – Men's 4 × 100 metres relay =

Men's 4 × 100 metres relay at the Pan American Games

The men's 4 × 100 metres relay event at the 1987 Pan American Games was held in Indianapolis, United States on 16 August.

== Results ==
Rank	Lane	Nation	Athletes	Time	Notes
1st place, gold medalist(s)	8	United States	Lee McRae, Lee McNeill, Harvey Glance, Carl Lewis	38.41	
2nd place, silver medalist(s)	6	Cuba	Ricardo Chacón, Leandro Peñalver, Maximo Sergio Querol, Andrés Simón	38.86	
3rd place, bronze medalist(s)	7	Jamaica	John Mair, Andrew Smith, Clive Wright, Ray Stewart	38.86	
4	1	Brazil	Jailto Bonfim, Sérgio Menezes, Arnaldo da Silva, Robson da Silva	39.85	
5	2	United States Virgin Islands	Neville Hodge, Floyd Brown, Ulric Jackson, Greg Barnes	40.51	NR
6	3	Dominican Republic	Modesto Castillo, Gerardo Suero, Osvaldo Aquino, Juan Núñez	40.53	
7	5	Belize	Cuthbert Burrell, Lawrence Smith, Damel Flowers, Devon Hyde	48.70	
	4	Antigua and Barbuda		DNS	
