= Burkina Faso at the 1988 Summer Olympics =

- IOC code: BUR
- NOC: Burkinabé National Olympic and Sports Council

in Seoul
- Competitors: 6 (5 men, 1 woman) in 2 sports
- Flag bearer: Sounaila Sagnon
- Medals: Gold 0 Silver 0 Bronze 0 Total 0

Summer Olympics appearances (overview)
- 1972; 1976–1984; 1988; 1992; 1996; 2000; 2004; 2008; 2012; 2016; 2020; 2024; 2028

Burkina Faso was represented at the 1988 Summer Olympics in Seoul, South Korea by the Burkinabé National Olympic and Sports Committee.

In total, six athletes including five men and one woman represented Burkina Faso in two different sports: athletics and boxing.

It was the country's first appearance as Burkina Faso at the Summer Olympics and their first appearance in 16 years.

== Background ==
Burkina Faso's only previous appearance at an Olympics came 16 years prior at the 1972 Summer Olympics in Munich, West Germany. At the time, the country was known as Upper Volta.

== Competitors ==
In total, six athletes represented Burkina Faso at the 1988 Summer Olympics in Seoul, South Korea across two different sports.

| Sport | Men | Women | Total |
|---|---|---|---|
| Athletics | 3 | 1 | 4 |
| Boxing | 2 | – | 2 |
| Total | 5 | 1 | 6 |

== Athletics ==
In total, four Burkinabe athletes participated in the athletics events – Harouna Pale and Alexandre Yougbare in the men's 100 m and the men's 200 m, Mariama Ouiminga in the women's 100 m and the women's 200 m and Cheick Seynou in the men's high jump.

The heats for the men's 100 m took place on 23 September 1988. Pale finished fifth in his heat, with a time of 10.76 seconds and did not advance to the quarter-finals. Yougbare finished seventh in his heat with a time of 10.9 seconds and did not advance to the quarter-finals.

The heats for the women's 100 m took place on 24 September 1988. Ouiminga finished eighth in her heat with a time of 12.62 seconds and did not advance to the quarter-finals.

The heats for the men's 200 m took place on 26 September 1988. Yougbare finished fourth in his heat in a time of 22.14 seconds and he did not advance to the quarter-finals. Pale finished third in his heat in a time of 21.33 seconds as he advanced to the quarter-finals. The quarter-finals took place later the same day. Pale finished seventh in his quarter-final in a time of 21.35 seconds and did not advance to the semi-finals.

The heats for the women's 200 m took place on 28 September 1988. Ouiminga finished seventh in her heat in a time of 26.08 seconds and she did not advance to the quarter-finals.

| Athlete | Event | Heat | | Quarterfinal | | Semifinal | | Final | |
| Athlete | Event | Result | Rank | Result | Rank | Result | Rank | Result | Rank |
|---|---|---|---|---|---|---|---|---|---|
| Harouna Pale | Men's 100 m | 10.76 | 5 | did not advance | | | | | |
| Alexandre Yougbare | Men's 100 m | 10.90 | 7 | did not advance | | | | | |
| Harouna Pale | Men's 200 m | 21.33 | 3 Q | 21.35 | 7 | did not advance | | | |
| Alexandre Yougbare | Men's 200 m | 22.14 | 4 | did not advance | | | | | |
| Mariama Ouiminga | Women's 100 m | 12.62 | 8 | did not advance | | | | | |
| Mariama Ouiminga | Women's 200 m | 26.08 | 7 | did not advance | | | | | |

The qualifying round for the men's high jump took place on 24 September 1988. Seynou contested qualifying group B. He did not record a successful jump.

| Athlete | Event | Qualification | | Final | |
| Athlete | Event | Result | Rank | Result | Rank |
|---|---|---|---|---|---|
| Cheick Seynou | Men's high jump | No mark | | did not advance | |

== Boxing ==
In total, two Burkinabe athletes participated in the boxing events – Moussa Kagambega in the featherweight category and Sounaila Sagnon in the light middleweight category.

The first round of the featherweight category took place on 18 September 1988. Kagambega received a bye to the second round. The second round took place on 22 September 1988. Kagambega lost to Omar Catarí of Venezuela.

The first round of the light middleweight category took place on 20 September 1988. Sagnon received a bye to the second round. The second round took place on 24 September 1988. Sagnon defeated John Bosco Waigo of Uganda to advance. The third round took place on 26 September 1988. Sagnon lost to Yevgeni Zaytsev of the Soviet Union.

| Athlete | Event | Round of 64 | Round of 32 | Round of 16 | Quarterfinals | Semifinals | Final | |
| Athlete | Event | Opposition Result | Opposition Result | Opposition Result | Opposition Result | Opposition Result | Opposition Result | Rank |
|---|---|---|---|---|---|---|---|---|
| Moussa Kagambega | Featherweight | Bye | Catarí (VEN); L KO-1 | did not advance | | | | |
| Sounaila Sagnon | Light middleweight | Bye | Waigo (UGA); W RSC-1 | Zaytsev (URS); L RSC-1 | did not advance | | | |
