= Athletics at the 1981 Summer Universiade – Men's 4 × 400 metres relay =

The men's 4 × 400 metres relay event at the 1981 Summer Universiade was held at the Stadionul Naţional in Bucharest on 24 and 26 July 1981.

== Results ==
=== Heats ===
Rank	Heat	Nation	Athletes	Time	Notes
1	2	United States	David Lee, Anthony Ketchum, David Patrick, Walter McCoy	3:08.90	Q
2	1	Soviet Union	Aleksandr Kurochkin, Aleksandr Zolotaryev, Viktor Markin, Vitaliy Fedotov	3:09.20	Q
3	1	Cuba	Jorge Batista, Carlos Reyté, Lázaro Martínez, Roberto Ramos	3:10.91	Q
4	1	Romania	Angel Grigore, Mihai Boroiu, Iosif Korodi, Zsigmond Nagy	3:11.67	Q
5	2	Congo	Alphonse Mandonda, Ghislain Obounghat, Jean-Didiace Bémou, Gilbert Mankou-Mankou	3:12.84	Q
6	2	Brazil	Katsuhiko Nakaya, Paulo Lima, Gérson de Souza, António Euzebio Ferreira	3:13.38	Q
7	2	West Germany	Wolfgang Richter, Frank Czioska, Manfred Nellesen, Uwe Wegner	3:14.07	q
8	1	Mexico	Rafael Echavarría, Yukihiro Minami, Ignacio Melesio, Sergio Barajas	3:17.65	q
9	1	Lebanon	Nabil Chouéri, Edward Maadandedjian, Fadi Rahme, Ali Hijazi	3:36.08	

=== Final ===
Rank	Nation	Athletes	Time	Notes
1st place, gold medalist(s)	Soviet Union	Aleksandr Zolotaryev, Vitaliy Fedotov, Viktor Burakov, Viktor Markin	3:02.75	
2nd place, silver medalist(s)	United States	David Lee, Anthony Ketchum, David Patrick, Walter McCoy	3:03.01	
3rd place, bronze medalist(s)	Brazil	Katsuhiko Nakaya, Paulo Lima, Gérson de Souza, António Euzebio Ferreira	3:06.79	
4	Cuba	Lázaro Martínez, Bárbaro Serrano, Carlos Reyté, Roberto Ramos	3:08.58	
5	West Germany	Manfred Nellesen, Frank Czioska, Uwe Wegner, Wolfgang Richter	3:09.75	
6	Romania	Zsigmond Nagy, Mihai Boroiu, Iosif Korodi, Angel Grigore	3:10.30	
7	Congo	Jean-Didiace Bémou, Ghislain Obounghat, Alphonse Mandonda, Gilbert Mankou-Mankou	3:11.28	
8	Mexico	Yukihiro Minami, Ignacio Melesio, Sergio Barajas, Rafael Echavarría	3:15.16	
