= Athletics at the 1983 Pan American Games – Men's 400 metres =

Men's 400 metres at the Pan American Games

The men's 400 metres event at the 1983 Pan American Games was held in Caracas, Venezuela on 26 and 27 August.

== Medalists ==
Gold	Silver	Bronze
Cliff Wiley; United States	Lázaro Martínez; Cuba	Gérson de Souza; Brazil

== Results ==
=== Heats ===
Rank	Heat	Name	Nationality	Time	Notes
1	1	James Rolle	United States	45.30	Q
2	2	Lázaro Martínez	Cuba	45.38	Q
3	2	Cliff Wiley	United States	45.55	Q
4	2	Gérson de Souza	Brazil	45.97	Q
5	1	Carlos Reyté	Cuba	46.19	Q
6	1	Aaron Phillips	Venezuela	46.38	Q
7	1	Steve Griffiths	Jamaica	46.43	q
8	2	Michael Puckerin	Trinidad and Tobago	46.48	q
9	2	Edison Reyes	Venezuela	46.62	
10	1	Evaldo da Silva	Brazil	46.72	
11	2	Devon Morris	Jamaica	46.73	
12	2	Alfred Browne	Antigua and Barbuda	48.07	
13	1	Larry Miller	Antigua and Barbuda	48.39	
14	2	Ulric Jackson	United States Virgin Islands	48.61	
	1	Bryan Saunders	Canada	DNS	

=== Final ===
Rank	Name	Nationality	Time	Notes
1st place, gold medalist(s)	Cliff Wiley	United States	45.02	
2nd place, silver medalist(s)	Lázaro Martínez	Cuba	45.37	
3rd place, bronze medalist(s)	Gérson de Souza	Brazil	45.45	
4	James Rolle	United States	45.70	
5	Carlos Reyté	Cuba	45.78	
6	Steve Griffiths	Jamaica	46.57	
7	Aaron Phillips	Venezuela	46.68	
8	Michael Puckerin	Trinidad and Tobago	46.97	
