= Athletics at the 1987 Pan American Games – Men's 100 metres =

The men's 100 metres event at the 1987 Pan American Games was held in Indianapolis, United States on 9 and 10 August.

== Medalists ==
Gold	Silver	Bronze
Lee McRae; United States	Ray Stewart; Jamaica	Juan Núñez; Dominican Republic

== Results ==
=== Heats ===
Wind:
Heat 1: +2.9 m/s, Heat 2: +2.7 m/s, Heat 3: +4.2 m/s, Heat 4: +3.5 m/s

Rank	Heat	Name	Nationality	Time	Notes
1	3	Ray Stewart	Jamaica	10.03	Q
2	2	Andrés Simón	Cuba	10.12	Q
3	4	Leandro Peñalver	Cuba	10.16	Q
4	3	Greg Barnes	United States Virgin Islands	10.21	Q
5	1	Mark Witherspoon	United States	10.24	Q
6	1	Juan Núñez	Dominican Republic	10.31	Q
6	2	Andrew Smith	Jamaica	10.31	Q
8	4	Arnaldo da Silva	Brazil	10.32	Q
9	4	Lee McRae	United States	10.33	Q
10	2	Gerardo Suero	Dominican Republic	10.36	Q
11	3	Carlos Moreno	Chile	10.40	Q
12	3	Lester Benjamin	Antigua and Barbuda	10.44	q
13	1	Luis Morales	Puerto Rico	10.45	Q
14	1	Jailto Bonfim	Brazil	10.49	q
15	2	Dazel Jules	Trinidad and Tobago	10.53	q
16	1	Bill Trott	Bermuda	10.60	q
17	4	Luis Smith	Panama	10.72	
18	4	Eduardo Nava	Mexico	10.84	
19	4	Lindel Hodge	British Virgin Islands	10.85	
20	2	St. Clair Soleyne	Antigua and Barbuda	10.90	
21	3	Guillermo Saucedo	Bolivia	10.94	
22	2	Javier Widoycovich	Chile	10.99	
23	3	Damel Flowers	Belize	11.01	
24	2	Claude Roumain	Haiti	11.28	
25	1	Cuthbert Burrell	Belize	11.58	
	1	Jimmy Flemming	United States Virgin Islands	DNS	

=== Semifinals ===
Wind:
Heat 1: +4.2 m/s, Heat 2: +6.0 m/s

Rank	Heat	Name	Nationality	Time	Notes
1	1	Ray Stewart	Jamaica	9.89	Q
2	1	Mark Witherspoon	United States	9.91	Q
3	2	Leandro Peñalver	Cuba	10.00	Q
4	2	Andrés Simón	Cuba	10.04	Q
5	1	Lee McRae	United States	10.05	Q
6	2	Juan Núñez	Dominican Republic	10.07	Q
7	2	Andrew Smith	Jamaica	10.11	Q
8	1	Greg Barnes	United States Virgin Islands	10.15	Q
9	2	Dazel Jules	Trinidad and Tobago	10.27	
10	1	Luis Morales	Puerto Rico	10.29	
11	1	Arnaldo da Silva	Brazil	10.33	
12	2	Jailto Bonfim	Brazil	10.37	
13	2	Carlos Moreno	Chile	10.37	
14	1	Bill Trott	Bermuda	10.44	
15	1	Lester Benjamin	Antigua and Barbuda	10.46	
16	2	Gerardo Suero	Dominican Republic	10.47	

=== Final ===
Wind: -3.4 m/s

Rank	Name	Nationality	Time	Notes
1st place, gold medalist(s)	Lee McRae	United States	10.26	
2nd place, silver medalist(s)	Ray Stewart	Jamaica	10.27	
3rd place, bronze medalist(s)	Juan Núñez	Dominican Republic	10.44	
4	Leandro Peñalver	Cuba	10.53	
5	Andrés Simón	Cuba	10.55	
6	Andrew Smith	Jamaica	10.62	
7	Greg Barnes	United States Virgin Islands	10.63	
	Mark Witherspoon	United States	DNS	
