= Athletics at the Friendship Games – Men's 400 metres =

The men's 400 metres event at the Friendship Games was held on 17 August 1984 at the Grand Arena of the Central Lenin Stadium in Moscow, Soviet Union.

== Results ==
Rank	Name	Nationality	Time	Notes
1st place, gold medalist(s)	Viktor Markin	Soviet Union	44.78	
2nd place, silver medalist(s)	Aleksandr Troshchilo	Soviet Union	45.51	
3rd place, bronze medalist(s)	Aleksandr Kurochkin	Soviet Union	45.52	PB
4	Carlos Reyté	Cuba	46.01	
5	Gusztáv Menczer	Hungary	46.12	
6	Ján Tomko	Czechoslovakia	46.23	
7	Lázaro Martínez	Cuba	46.76	
8	Dimitar Rangelov	Bulgaria	46.82	
9	Vincent Confait	Seychelles	49.46	
10	M. Ralambu	Malaysia	50.49	
11	Mohammed Samanter	South Yemen	50.87	
12	A. Bah Abdoul	Guinea	51.00	
13	B. Tousi	Malaysia	51.10	
14	M. Daud	South Yemen	52.31	
15	A. A. Zakir	South Yemen	52.31	
16	Pa Niul	Cambodia	53.79	

== See also ==
- Athletics at the 1984 Summer Olympics – Men's 400 metres
