= Athletics at the 1987 Pan American Games – Men's 4 × 400 metres relay =

Men's 4 × 400 metres relay at the Pan American Games

The men's 4 × 400 metres relay event at the 1987 Pan American Games was held in Indianapolis, United States on 16 August.

== Results ==
Rank	Nation	Athletes	Time	Notes
1st place, gold medalist(s)	United States	Mark Rowe, Kevin Robinzine, Raymond Pierre, Roddie Haley	2:59.54	GR
2nd place, silver medalist(s)	Cuba	Leandro Peñalver, Agustín Pavó, Lazaro Martínez, Roberto Hernández	2:59.72	NR
3rd place, bronze medalist(s)	Jamaica	Winthrop Graham, Mark Senior, Berris Long, Devon Morris	3:03.57	
4	Brazil	Antônio Dias Ferreira, Pedro Chiamulera, Sérgio Menezes, Gerson de Souza	3:08.21	
5	Venezuela	Aaron Phillips, Rafael Díaz, Charles Bodington, Jesús Malavé	3:08.63	
6	Antigua and Barbuda	Howard Lindsay, Oral Selkridge, Mitchell Browne, Larry Miller	3:10.84	
7	Bermuda	Troy Douglas, Gerald Bean, Bill Trott, Devoe Whaley	3:11.30	NR
8	Mexico	Efrain Pedroza, Mauricio Hernández, Eduardo Nava, Luis Karim Toledo	3:13.20	
