= Athletics at the 1987 Pan American Games – Men's 400 metres =

Men's 400 metres at the Pan American Games

The men's 400 metres event at the 1987 Pan American Games was held in Indianapolis, United States on 10, 12 and 13 August.

== Medalists ==
Gold	Silver	Bronze
Raymond Pierre; United States	Bert Cameron; Jamaica	Roberto Hernández; Cuba

== Results ==
=== Heats ===
Rank	Heat	Name	Nationality	Time	Notes
1	3	Raymond Pierre	United States	46.14	Q
2	3	Ian Morris	Trinidad and Tobago	46.45	Q
3	1	Roberto Hernández	Cuba	46.47	Q
4	2	Lázaro Martínez	Cuba	46.65	Q
5	1	Hector Daley	Panama	46.85	Q
6	2	Gérson de Souza	Brazil	46.88	Q
7	3	Elvis Forde	Barbados	46.89	Q
8	2	Bert Cameron	Jamaica	46.94	Q
9	1	Sérgio Menezes	Brazil	47.01	Q
10	2	Aaron Phillips	Venezuela	47.10	Q
11	3	Troy Douglas	Bermuda	47.28	Q
12	1	Berris Long	Jamaica	47.52	Q
13	3	Howard Lindsay	Antigua and Barbuda	48.00	q
14	2	Patrick Delice	Trinidad and Tobago	48.28	q
15	3	Dean Greenaway	British Virgin Islands	48.58	q
16	2	Mitchell Browne	Antigua and Barbuda	49.09	q
17	2	Keith Smith	United States Virgin Islands	49.37	
18	1	Gerald Bean	Bermuda	49.51	
19	1	Mitchell Peters	United States Virgin Islands	50.60	
	1	Jesús Malavé	Venezuela	DQ	
	3	Allan Ingraham	Bahamas	DNS	

=== Semifinals ===
Rank	Heat	Name	Nationality	Time	Notes
1	1	Raymond Pierre	United States	45.25	Q
2	2	Roberto Hernández	Cuba	45.53	Q
3	1	Bert Cameron	Jamaica	45.82	Q
4	1	Hector Daley	Panama	45.95	Q
5	2	Elvis Forde	Barbados	45.96	Q
6	1	Lázaro Martínez	Cuba	46.05	Q
7	2	Ian Morris	Trinidad and Tobago	46.14	Q
8	2	Berris Long	Jamaica	46.54	Q
9	2	Gérson de Souza	Brazil	46.79	
10	1	Aaron Phillips	Venezuela	47.15	
11	1	Sérgio Menezes	Brazil	47.30	
12	2	Troy Douglas	Bermuda	47.59	
13	1	Howard Lindsay	Antigua and Barbuda	47.87	
14	2	Mitchell Browne	Antigua and Barbuda	48.29	
15	2	Dean Greenaway	British Virgin Islands	48.68	
16	1	Patrick Delice	Trinidad and Tobago	48.90	

=== Final ===
Rank	Name	Nationality	Time	Notes
1st place, gold medalist(s)	Raymond Pierre	United States	44.60	
2nd place, silver medalist(s)	Bert Cameron	Jamaica	44.72	
3rd place, bronze medalist(s)	Roberto Hernández	Cuba	45.13	
4	Ian Morris	Trinidad and Tobago	45.53	
5	Hector Daley	Panama	45.56	
6	Elvis Forde	Barbados	45.56	
7	Lázaro Martínez	Cuba	45.57	
8	Berris Long	Jamaica	46.25	
