= Gusztáv Menczer =

Hungarian sprinter

Personal information
- Born: 15 October 1959 (age 66)
- Height: 1.85 m (6 ft 1 in)
- Weight: 72 kg (159 lb)

Sport
- Sport: Athletics
- Event: 400 metres

Gusztáv Menczer (born 15 October 1959) is a Hungarian former sprinter who specialised in the 400 metres. He represented his country at the 1983 World Championships and 1989 World Indoor Championships.

== International competitions ==
Year	Competition	Venue	Position	Event	Notes
Representing Hungary
1983	European Indoor Championships	Budapest, Hungary	14th (h)	400 m	48.54
1983	World Championships	Helsinki, Finland	16th (sf)	4 × 400 m relay	3:11.08
1984	Friendship Games	Moscow, Soviet Union	5th	400 m	46.12
1984	Friendship Games	Moscow, Soviet Union	6th	4 × 400 m relay	3:06.28
1985	European Indoor Championships	Piraeus, Greece	5th (h)	400 m	47.20^{1}
1985	Universiade	Kobe, Japan	32nd (h)	200 m	23.31
1985	Universiade	Kobe, Japan	4th	400 m	46.06
1985	Universiade	Kobe, Japan	7th	4 × 400 m relay	3:07.84
1986	European Championships	Stuttgart, West Germany	18th (h)	400 m	46.40
1986	European Championships	Stuttgart, West Germany	9th (h)	4 × 400 m relay	3:09.50
1988	European Indoor Championships	Budapest, Hungary	7th (sf)	400 m	47.13
1989	World Indoor Championships	Budapest, Hungary	16th (h)	400 m	47.43

^{1}Did not finish in the semifinals

== Personal bests ==
Outdoor

- 100 metres – 10.48 (+1.8 m/s, Budapest 1993)
- 200 metres – 20.75 (+1.8 m/s, Budapest 1986)
- 400 metres – 45.81 (Kobe 1985)
- Long jump – 7.59 (Budapest 1981)

Indoor

- 200 metres – 21.62 (Vienna 1985)
- 400 metres – 46.96 (Budapest 1988)
- Long jump – 7.46 (Budapest 1982)
