= Athletics at the 1983 Summer Universiade – Men's 400 metres =

The men's 400 metres event at the 1983 Summer Universiade was held at the Commonwealth Stadium in Edmonton, Canada on 5, 6 and 7 July 1983.

== Medalists ==
| Gold | Silver | Bronze |
|---|---|---|
| Sunday Uti; Nigeria | Viktor Markin; Soviet Union | Sunder Nix; United States |

== Results ==
=== Heats ===
| Rank | Heat | Athlete | Nationality | Time | Notes |
|---|---|---|---|---|---|
| 1 | 4 | Sunday Uti | Nigeria | 46.25 | Q |
| 2 | 2 | Eliot Tabron | United States | 46.34 | Q |
| 3 | 2 | Susumu Takano | Japan | 46.43 | Q |
| 4 | 3 | Sunder Nix | United States | 46.48 | Q |
| 5 | 4 | Elvis Forde | Barbados | 46.51 | Q |
| 6 | 1 | Lázaro Martínez | Cuba | 46.74 | Q |
| 7 | 2 | Viktor Markin | Soviet Union | 46.87 | Q |
| 8 | 4 | Oddur Sigurðsson | Iceland | 46.96 | Q |
| 9 | 1 | Gérson de Souza | Brazil | 46.97 | Q |
| 10 | 4 | Doug Hinds | Canada | 46.99 | q |
| 11 | 3 | Héctor Herrera | Cuba | 47.00 | Q |
| 12 | 3 | Sergey Kutsebo | Soviet Union | 47.09 | Q |
| 13 | 1 | Aldo Canti | France | 47.14 | Q |
| 14 | 2 | Heinz Weginer | West Germany | 47.25 | q |
| 15 | 4 | Juan Hormillos | Spain | 47.27 | q |
| 16 | 1 | John Okoye | Nigeria | 47.46 | q |
| 17 | 1 | Kazunori Asaba | Japan | 47.61 | |
| 18 | 3 | Vive Fegert | West Germany | 47.63 | |
| 19 | 2 | Tim Bethune | Canada | 47.69 | |
| 20 | 1 | Said M'Hand | Morocco | 48.03 | |
| 20 | 4 | Aphonse Madonda | Congo | 48.03 | |
| 22 | 3 | Mohamed Alouini | Tunisia | 48.07 | |
| 23 | 2 | Lee Davis | Jamaica | 48.56 | |
| 24 | 1 | Gualberto Paquete | Angola | 49.10 | |
| 25 | 4 | Abdelali Kasbane | Morocco | 49.17 | |
| 26 | 2 | Jacinto Macamba | Angola | 49.48 | |
| 27 | 2 | Reinaldo Leiva | Guatemala | 50.55 | |
| 28 | 1 | Mario Villagran | Guatemala | 52.69 | |
| 29 | 3 | Paul Carvana | Malta | 55.62 | |

=== Semifinals ===
| Rank | Heat | Athlete | Nationality | Time | Notes |
|---|---|---|---|---|---|
| 1 | 2 | Sunday Uti | Nigeria | 45.50 | Q |
| 2 | 1 | Eliot Tabron | United States | 45.63 | Q |
| 3 | 2 | Sunder Nix | United States | 45.74 | Q |
| 4 | 1 | Susumu Takano | Japan | 45.86 | Q |
| 5 | 2 | Viktor Markin | Soviet Union | 45.87 | Q |
| 6 | 2 | Gérson de Souza | Brazil | 45.95 | q |
| 7 | 1 | Lázaro Martínez | Cuba | 46.20 | Q |
| 8 | 2 | Aldo Canti | France | 46.26 | q |
| 9 | 1 | Sergey Kutsebo | Soviet Union | 46.36 | |
| 10 | 1 | Doug Hinds | Canada | 46.78 | |
| 11 | 2 | Elvis Forde | Barbados | 47.03 | |
| 12 | 1 | Oddur Sigurðsson | Iceland | 47.12 | |
| 13 | 1 | Heinz Weginer | West Germany | 47.33 | |
| 13 | 2 | Juan Hormillos | Spain | 47.33 | |
| 15 | 1 | John Okoye | Nigeria | 47.58 | |
| 16 | 2 | Héctor Herrera | Cuba | 48.09 | |

=== Final ===
| Rank | Athlete | Nationality | Time | Notes |
|---|---|---|---|---|
| 1st place, gold medalist(s) | Sunday Uti | Nigeria | 45.32 | |
| 2nd place, silver medalist(s) | Viktor Markin | Soviet Union | 45.38 | |
| 3rd place, bronze medalist(s) | Sunder Nix | United States | 45.53 | |
| 4 | Eliot Tabron | United States | 45.82 | |
| 5 | Susumu Takano | Japan | 46.00 | |
| 6 | Gérson de Souza | Brazil | 46.03 | |
| 7 | Aldo Canti | France | 46.15 | |
| 8 | Lázaro Martínez | Cuba | 46.67 | |
