= Athletics at the 1987 Summer Universiade – Men's 400 metres =

The men's 400 metres event at the 1987 Summer Universiade was held at the Stadion Maksimir in Zagreb on 13, 14 and 15 July 1987.

== Medalists ==
Gold	Silver	Bronze
Michael Franks; United States	Moses Ugbusien; Nigeria	Raymond Pierre; United States

== Results ==
=== Heats ===
Rank	Heat	Athlete	Nationality	Time	Notes
1	1	Moses Ugbisien	Nigeria	45.98	Q
2	5	Raymond Pierre	United States	46.59	Q
3	1	Howard Burnett	Jamaica	46.65	Q
4	1	Ismail Mačev	Yugoslavia	46.77	q
5	2	Antonio Sánchez	Spain	46.78	Q
6	3	Michael Franks	United States	46.80	Q
6	9	Vladimir Prosin	Soviet Union	46.80	Q
8	2	Slobodan Branković	Yugoslavia	46.92	Q
9	2	Carlos Morales	Chile	46.96	q
10	3	Andre Smith	Canada	47.19	Q
11	9	Joseph Falaye	Nigeria	47.21	Q
12	7	Andrea Montanari	Italy	47.41	Q
13	6	Anatole Zongo Kuyo	Ivory Coast	47.54	Q
14	1	Marcello Pantone	Italy	47.56	q
15	8	Ervin Katona	Hungary	47.59	Q
16	6	António Abrantes	Portugal	47.65	Q
17	7	Manuel González	Spain	47.89	Q
18	5	Sylvain Lake	Canada	48.08	Q
19	1	Domingo Cordero	Puerto Rico	48.18	q
20	6	Donald Porter	Jamaica	48.30	q
21	1	Moisés del Castillo	Peru	48.58	
22	5	Jonathan Njau	Tanzania	48.60	
23	5	Irving Gil	Panama	48.68	
24	9	Pedro Curvelo	Portugal	48.85	
25	1	David Ince	Barbados	48.92	
26	6	Melvin Morales	Puerto Rico	48.99	
27	2	Muhammad Fayyaz	Pakistan	49.09	
27	5	Alejandro Krauss	Chile	49.09	
29	7	Faustino Kiwa	Uganda	49.38	
30	3	Fikret Tulumtaş	Turkey	49.56	
31	4	Marek Sira	Poland	49.59	Q
32	7	Alberto Izu	Peru	49.81	
33	4	Omar Abdulkadir Arale	Somalia	49.83	Q
34	2	Andrew Scully	Malaysia	49.97	
35	8	Charalambos Papadopoulos	Cyprus	50.18	Q
36	3	Sekou Diakite	Guinea	50.69	
37	2	Clement Taipala	Papua New Guinea	50.92	
38	3	Naderi Mirwais	Afghanistan	50.93	
39	4	Ekoue Ekoue-Totou	Togo	51.53	
40	5	Manuel Youness	Lebanon	51.94	
41	5	Chung Man Biu	Hong Kong	52.28	
42	7	Lee Ka Kit	Hong Kong	53.59	
43	8	Maher Abou Hajleh	Jordan	53.63	
44	3	Soliman Ismailalazhari	Sudan	54.31	

=== Semifinals ===
Rank	Heat	Athlete	Nationality	Time	Notes
1	1	Michael Franks	United States	45.56	Q
2	1	Vladimir Prosin	Soviet Union	45.63	Q
3	2	Raymond Pierre	United States	45.71	Q
4	1	Antonio Sánchez	Spain	45.99	q
5	2	Howard Burnett	Jamaica	46.15	Q
6	3	Moses Ugbisien	Nigeria	46.18	Q
7	3	Andre Smith	Canada	46.38	Q
8	3	Ismail Mačev	Yugoslavia	46.44	q
9	3	Marek Sira	Poland	46.59	
10	2	Slobodan Branković	Yugoslavia	46.73	
11	1	Andrea Montanari	Italy	47.17	
12	2	Marcello Pantone	Italy	47.23	
13	2	Joseph Falaye	Nigeria	47.27	
14	1	Carlos Morales	Chile	47.45	
15	2	António Abrantes	Portugal	47.53	
16	3	Ervin Katona	Hungary	47.61	
17	1	Donald Porter	Jamaica	47.83	
18	3	Manuel González	Spain	47.84	
19	1	Anatole Zongo Kuyo	Ivory Coast	47.87	
20	1	Moisés del Castillo	Peru	48.04	
21	3	Sylvain Lake	Canada	48.15	
22	2	Charalambos Papadopoulos	Cyprus	49.87	
23	2	Omar Abdulkadir Arale	Somalia	50.06	
	3	Domingo Cordero	Puerto Rico	?	

=== Final ===
Rank	Lane	Athlete	Nationality	Time	Notes
1st place, gold medalist(s)	3	Michael Franks	United States	45.33	
2nd place, silver medalist(s)	2	Moses Ugbisien	Nigeria	45.37	
3rd place, bronze medalist(s)	6	Raymond Pierre	United States	45.67	
4	5	Antonio Sánchez	Spain	45.82	
5	4	Vladimir Prosin	Soviet Union	45.91	
6	7	Ismail Mačev	Yugoslavia	46.17	
7	8	Andre Smith	Canada	46.30	
8	1	Howard Burnett	Jamaica	47.32	
