= Athletics at the 1981 Summer Universiade – Men's 400 metres =

The men's 400 metres event at the 1981 Summer Universiade was held at the Stadionul Naţional in Bucharest on 23, 24 and 25 July 1981.

== Medalists ==
Gold	Silver	Bronze
Cliff Wiley; United States	Walter McCoy; United States	Gérson de Souza; Brazil

== Results ==
=== Heats ===
Rank	Heat	Athlete	Nationality	Time	Notes
1	1	Walter McCoy	United States	46.32	Q
2	2	Cliff Wiley	United States	46.70	Q
3	3	Viktor Burakov	Soviet Union	46.76	Q
4	2	Vitaliy Fedotov	Soviet Union	46.81	Q
5	6	Gérson de Souza	Brazil	46.99	Q
6	2	Benjamín González	Spain	47.05	Q
7	3	Roberto Tozzi	Italy	47.12	Q
8	2	Avognan Nogboum	Ivory Coast	47.18	q
8	3	Goran Humar	Yugoslavia	47.18	Q
10	6	Melvin Fowell	Great Britain	47.23	Q
11	3	Urs Kamber	Switzerland	47.32	q
12	5	Stefano Malinverni	Italy	47.47	Q
13	6	Carlos Reyté	Cuba	47.57	Q
14	5	Christoph Trappe	West Germany	47.60	Q
15	1	Uwe Wegner	West Germany	47.83	Q
16	1	Shigenori Omori	Japan	47.89	Q
17	5	Roberto Ramos	Cuba	47.90	Q
18	1	Silvio Almanzar	Dominican Republic	48.00	q
19	4	Marcel Klarenbeek	Netherlands	48.09	Q
20	5	Jean Didoce Mbemou	Congo	48.27	q
21	3	Nikolaos Megalemos	Greece	48.49	q
22	4	Alphonse Mandonda	Congo	48.79	Q
23	5	Takashi Nagao	Japan	48.82	q
24	2	Murat Akman	Turkey	49.07	
25	2	Zsigmond Nagy	Romania	49.53	
26	4	Horia Toboc	Romania	49.67	Q
27	6	Sergio Barajas	Mexico	49.95	
28	6	Yukihiro Minami	Mexico	50.03	
29	4	Yoav Meckel	Israel	50.14	
30	1	Fadi Rahme	Lebanon	51.53	
31	4	Edward Maadandedjian	Lebanon	52.54	
32	2	Paul Caruana	Malta	53.76	

=== Semifinals ===
Rank	Heat	Athlete	Nationality	Time	Notes
1	1	Walter McCoy	United States	45.90	Q
2	2	Cliff Wiley	United States	46.12	Q
3	2	Stefano Malinverni	Italy	46.21	Q
4	1	Marcel Klarenbeek	Netherlands	46.45	Q
5	1	Carlos Reyté	Cuba	46.47	q
6	1	Benjamín González	Spain	46.48	q
7	3	Viktor Burakov	Soviet Union	46.55	Q
8	2	Vitaliy Fedotov	Soviet Union	46.56	
9	3	Gérson de Souza	Brazil	46.77	Q
10	3	Melvin Fowell	Great Britain	46.94	
11	3	Uwe Wegner	West Germany	47.03	
12	2	Goran Humar	Yugoslavia	47.16	
13	1	Urs Kamber	Switzerland	47.22	
14	1	Roberto Tozzi	Italy	47.27	
15	2	Avognan Nogboum	Ivory Coast	47.33	
16	1	Silvio Almanzar	Dominican Republic	47.84	
17	3	Alphonse Mandonda	Congo	48.08	
18	2	Jean Didoce Mbemou	Congo	48.26	
19	2	Roberto Ramos	Cuba	48.29	
20	3	Nikolaos Megalemos	Greece	48.33	
21	1	Horia Toboc	Romania	48.41	
22	3	Shigenori Omori	Japan	48.64	
	?	Christoph Trappe	West Germany	?	
	?	Takashi Nagao	Japan	?	

=== Final ===
Rank	Athlete	Nationality	Time	Notes
1st place, gold medalist(s)	Cliff Wiley	United States	45.18	
2nd place, silver medalist(s)	Walter McCoy	United States	45.33	
3rd place, bronze medalist(s)	Gérson de Souza	Brazil	45.91	
4	Carlos Reyté	Cuba	46.10	
5	Stefano Malinverni	Italy	46.35	
6	Marcel Klarenbeek	Netherlands	46.41	
7	Benjamín González	Spain	46.56	
8	Viktor Burakov	Soviet Union	46.57	
