= 1989 IAAF World Indoor Championships – Men's 60 metres =

The men's 60 metres event at the 1989 IAAF World Indoor Championships was held at the Budapest Sportcsarnok in Budapest on 5 March.

== Medalists ==
Gold	Silver	Bronze
Andrés Simón; Cuba	John Myles-Mills; Ghana	Pierfrancesco Pavoni; Italy

== Results ==
=== Heats ===
The winner of each heat (Q) and next 6 fastest (q) qualified for the semifinals.

Rank	Heat	Name	Nationality	Time	Notes
1	1	Andreas Berger	Austria	6.62	Q
1	2	Ricardo Chacón	Cuba	6.62	Q
1	3	Andrés Simón	Cuba	6.62	Q
4	6	Stanley Floyd	United States	6.63	Q
5	2	Antonio Ullo	Italy	6.64	q
5	1	Matthias Schlicht	West Germany	6.64	q
5	5	Michael Rosswess	Great Britain	6.64	Q
5	6	John Myles-Mills	Ghana	6.64	q
9	4	Pierfrancesco Pavoni	Italy	6.66	Q
10	6	Koji Kurihara	Japan	6.69	q
11	4	Desai Williams	Canada	6.71	q
12	1	Bruny Surin	Canada	6.72	q
13	6	Anri Grigorov	Bulgaria	6.73	
14	3	Ronald Desruelles	Belgium	6.74	
14	4	Attila Kovács	Hungary	6.74	
16	3	Jiří Hudec	Czechoslovakia	6.76	
16	3	Shinji Aoto	Japan	6.76	
16	4	Mike McFarlane	Great Britain	6.76	
19	2	Aleksandr Shlychkov	Soviet Union	6.77	
20	2	Arnaldo da Silva	Brazil	6.78	
21	4	Fabian Whymns	Bahamas	6.79	NR
22	2	Franz Ratzenberger	Austria	6.80	
22	5	Wayne Watson	Jamaica	6.80	
22	5	István Tatár	Hungary	6.80	
25	3	Yiannakis Zisimides	Cyprus	6.81	
26	1	Shane Naylor	Australia	6.83	
27	5	Emmanuel Tuffour	Ghana	6.85	
28	5	Jouni Myllymäki	Finland	6.86	
29	2	Luís Cunha	Portugal	6.90	
30	4	Ayhan Bodur	Turkey	7.03	
31	3	Guillermo Saucedo	Bolivia	7.08	NR
32	6	Clinton Bufuku	Zambia	7.18	NR
33	6	Marco Tamagnini	San Marino	7.22	NR
	1	Trevor Davis	Anguilla	DQ	

=== Semifinals ===
First 3 of each semifinal (Q) qualified directly for the final.

Rank	Heat	Name	Nationality	Time	Notes
1	1	Andrés Simón	Cuba	6.54	Q, NR
2	1	Michael Rosswess	Great Britain	6.58	Q, PB
2	2	John Myles-Mills	Ghana	6.58	Q, NR
2	2	Pierfrancesco Pavoni	Italy	6.58	Q, =NR
2	2	Matthias Schlicht	West Germany	6.58	Q, =PB
6	2	Stanley Floyd	United States	6.59	PB
7	2	Ricardo Chacón	Cuba	6.59	
8	1	Antonio Ullo	Italy	6.61	Q
8	2	Bruny Surin	Canada	6.61	PB
10	1	Andreas Berger	Austria	6.62	
11	1	Desai Williams	Canada	6.64	
12	1	Koji Kurihara	Japan	6.72	

=== Final ===
Rank	Lane	Name	Nationality	Time	Notes
1st place, gold medalist(s)	3	Andrés Simón	Cuba	6.52	NR
2nd place, silver medalist(s)	4	John Myles-Mills	Ghana	6.59	
3rd place, bronze medalist(s)	1	Pierfrancesco Pavoni	Italy	6.61	
4	4	Antonio Ullo	Italy	6.63	
5	5	Michael Rosswess	Great Britain	6.64	
6	2	Matthias Schlicht	West Germany	6.67	
