= Athletics at the 1983 Pan American Games – Men's 4 × 400 metres relay =

Men's 4 × 400 metres relay at the Pan American Games

The men's 4 × 400 metres relay event at the 1983 Pan American Games was held in Caracas, Venezuela on 28 August.

== Results ==
Rank	Nation	Athletes	Time	Notes
1st place, gold medalist(s)	United States	Alonzo Babers, Mike Bradley, James Rolle, Eddie Carey	3:00.47	
2nd place, silver medalist(s)	Brazil	Evaldo da Silva, José Luíz Barbosa, Agberto Guimarães, Gerson de Souza	3:02.79	
3rd place, bronze medalist(s)	Cuba	Lázaro Martínez, Agustín Pavó, Carlos Reyte, Héctor Herrera	3:03.15	
4	Trinidad and Tobago	Carlyle Bernard, Andrew Bruce, Oswald Peters, Michael Puckerin	3:05.91	
5	Venezuela	Aaron Phillips, Jesús Malavé, Edison Reyes, Hipólito Brown	3:06.50	
6	Canada	Lloyd Guss, Mark Guthrie, Ian Newhouse, Brian Saunders	3:07.17	
7	Antigua and Barbuda	Alfred Brown, Larry Miller, Dale Jones, Jyme Bridges	3:15.36	
