= Seynou =

Seynou is both a given name and a surname. Notable people with the name include:

- Seynou Loum (born 1972), Senegalese sprinter
- Cheick Seynou (born 1967), Burkinabé athlete
