= Athletics at the 1981 Summer Universiade – Men's 100 metres =

The men's 100 metres event at the 1981 Summer Universiade was held at the Stadionul Naţional in Bucharest on 21 and 22 July 1981.

== Medalists ==
Gold	Silver	Bronze
Mel Lattany; United States	Calvin Smith; United States	Ernest Obeng; Ghana

== Results ==
=== Heats ===
Held on 21 July

Wind:
Heat 1: -1.9 m/s, Heat 2: +1.9 m/s, Heat 3: -0.4 m/s, Heat 4: +0.3 m/s, Heat 5: +2.1 m/s, Heat 6: +0.7 m/s, Heat 7: ? m/s

Rank	Heat	Athlete	Nationality	Time	Notes
1	5	Calvin Smith	United States	10.29	Q
2	5	Nikolay Sidorov	Soviet Union	10.38	Q
3	1	Mel Lattany	United States	10.40	Q
4	6	Théophile Nkounkou	Congo	10.55	Q
5	2	Ernest Obeng	Ghana	10.62	Q
6	3	Philippe Lejoncour	France	10.65	Q
7	3	Tomás González	Cuba	10.66	Q
8	5	László Babály	Hungary	10.66	Q
8	7	Cameron Sharp	Great Britain	10.66	Q
10	2	Paul Narracott	Australia	10.69	Q
11	4	Vasile Selever	Romania	10.73	Q
11	6	Diego Nodari	Italy	10.73	Q
13	6	Javier Martínez	Spain	10.75	Q
13	7	Stefano Curini	Italy	10.75	Q
15	4	Jesús Cabrera	Puerto Rico	10.76	Q
15	5	Jang Jae-keun	South Korea	10.76	q
15	7	Andrey Shlyapnikov	Soviet Union	10.76	Q
15	7	István Nagy	Hungary	10.76	q
19	4	Katsuhiko Nakaya	Brazil	10.80	Q
20	1	Leandro Peñalver	Cuba	10.81	Q
20	4	Gabriel Brothier	France	10.81	q
22	3	Josep Carbonell	Spain	10.82	Q
23	5	Barthélémy Koffi	Ivory Coast	10.85	
24	2	Brahim Badi	Algeria	10.89	Q
25	4	Henri Ndinga	Congo	10.91	
26	6	Kosmas Stratos	Greece	10.92	
27	1	Hirohito Yamazaki	Japan	10.97	Q
28	7	Rafael Domínguez	Mexico	10.99	
29	4	Aleksandar Popović	Yugoslavia	11.02	
30	1	Kazimierz Grubecki	Poland	11.03	
31	3	Sükrü Caprazli	Turkey	11.04	
32	7	Xiong Yuhui	China	11.10	
33	4	Boubacar Diallo	Senegal	11.13	
34	5	Sabidou Touré	Senegal	11.18	
35	6	Roland Dagher	Lebanon	11.22	
36	6	Don Wright	Australia	11.25	
37	5	Patrick Arache	Lebanon	11.36	
38	4	Jabir Mhana	Iraq	11.44	
39	3	Pham The Trieu	Vietnam	11.54	
40	1	Enrique Vizcarra	Mexico	11.60	
41	7	Constantin Ivan	Romania	12.22	
	2	Mohamed Bishty	Libya	DQ	

=== Semifinals ===
Held on 22 July

Wind:
Heat 1: -0.8 m/s, Heat 2: +0.5 m/s, Heat 3: -0.6 m/s

Rank	Heat	Athlete	Nationality	Time	Notes
1	3	Mel Lattany	United States	10.19	Q
2	1	Calvin Smith	United States	10.21	Q
3	2	Ernest Obeng	Ghana	10.36	Q
4	2	Nikolay Sidorov	Soviet Union	10.43	Q
5	3	Théophile Nkounkou	Congo	10.46	Q
6	2	István Nagy	Hungary	10.49	q
7	2	Cameron Sharp	Great Britain	10.50	q
8	1	Philippe Lejoncour	France	10.52	Q
9	3	Andrey Shlyapnikov	Soviet Union	10.61	
10	1	Tomás González	Cuba	10.62	
11	3	László Babály	Hungary	10.64	
12	1	Diego Nodari	Italy	10.68	
13	1	Javier Martínez	Spain	10.69	
14	3	Paul Narracott	Australia	10.70	
15	1	Katsuhiko Nakaya	Brazil	10.71	
16	2	Leandro Peñalver	Cuba	10.72	
16	2	Vasile Selever	Romania	10.72	
16	3	Josep Carbonell	Spain	10.72	
19	2	Stefano Curini	Italy	10.74	
20	3	Gabriel Brothier	France	10.77	
21	1	Jesús Cabrera	Puerto Rico	10.78	
22	2	Brahim Badi	Algeria	10.91	
	?	Hirohito Yamazaki	Japan	?	
	?	Jang Jae-keun	South Korea	?	

=== Final ===
Held on 22 July

Wind: -0.5 m/s

Rank	Athlete	Nationality	Time	Notes
1st place, gold medalist(s)	Mel Lattany	United States	10.18	
2nd place, silver medalist(s)	Calvin Smith	United States	10.26	
3rd place, bronze medalist(s)	Ernest Obeng	Ghana	10.37	
4	Nikolay Sidorov	Soviet Union	10.40	
5	Théophile Nkounkou	Congo	10.45	
6	István Nagy	Hungary	10.45	
7	Philippe Lejoncour	France	10.51	
8	Cameron Sharp	Great Britain	10.54	
