= 1983 European Athletics Indoor Championships – Men's 400 metres =

The men's 400 metres event at the 1983 European Athletics Indoor Championships was held on 5 and 6 March.

== Medalists ==
Gold	Silver	Bronze
Yevgeniy Lomtyev; Soviet Union	Ainsley Bennett; Great Britain	Ángel Heras; Spain

== Results ==
=== Heats ===
First 3 from each heat (Q) and the next 1 fastest (q) qualified for the semifinals.

Rank	Heat	Name	Nationality	Time	Notes
1	1	Ángel Heras	Spain	47.33	Q
2	2	Sergey Lovachov	Soviet Union	47.41	Q
3	1	Sándor Újhelyi	Hungary	47.51	Q
4	3	Ainsley Bennett	Great Britain	47.68	Q
5	1	Bozhidar Konstantinov	Bulgaria	47.70	Q
6	3	Yevgeniy Lomtyev	Soviet Union	47.73	Q
7	3	Dušan Malovec	Czechoslovakia	47.77	Q
8	1	Jean-Jacques Février	France	47.80	q
9	3	István Takács	Hungary	48.00	
10	2	Toma Tomov	Bulgaria	48.04	Q
11	1	Stefano Malinverni	Italy	48.06	
12	2	Christoph Trappe	West Germany	48.17	Q
13	2	Andreas Kaufmann	Switzerland	48.34	
14	2	Gusztáv Menczer	Hungary	48.54	

=== Semifinals ===
First 2 from each semifinal (Q) and next 1 fastest (q) qualified for the final.

Rank	Heat	Name	Nationality	Time	Notes
1	1	Ainsley Bennett	Great Britain	46.87	Q
2	1	Yevgeniy Lomtyev	Soviet Union	46.93	Q
3	1	Ángel Heras	Spain	47.08	q
4	1	Toma Tomov	Bulgaria	47.35	
5	1	Jean-Jacques Février	France	47.84	
6	2	Christoph Trappe	West Germany	47.90	Q
7	2	Dušan Malovec	Czechoslovakia	47.94	Q
8	2	Bozhidar Konstantinov	Bulgaria	48.25	
	2	Sergey Lovachov	Soviet Union	DNS	
	2	Sándor Újhelyi	Hungary	DNS	

=== Final ===
Rank	Lane	Name	Nationality	Time	Notes
1st place, gold medalist(s)	3	Yevgeniy Lomtyev	Soviet Union	46.20	PB
2nd place, silver medalist(s)	4	Ainsley Bennett	Great Britain	46.43	
3rd place, bronze medalist(s)	1	Ángel Heras	Spain	46.57	
4	5	Christoph Trappe	West Germany	46.62	
5	2	Dušan Malovec	Czechoslovakia	46.65	NR
