= Evaldo da Silva =

Brazilian sprinter (born 1958)

Personal information
- Full name: Evaldo Rosa da Silva
- Born: 18 October 1958 (age 67) Bagé, Rio Grande do Sul, Brazil
- Height: 1.84 m (6 ft 0 in)
- Weight: 73 kg (161 lb)

Sport
- Sport: Sprinting
- Event: 400 metres

Evaldo Rosa da Silva (born 18 October 1958) is a Brazilian sprinter. He competed in the men's 400 metres at the 1984 Summer Olympics.

His personal best in the event is 46.5 set in 1980.

== International competitions ==
Year	Competition	Venue	Position	Event	Notes
Representing Brazil
1983	Pan American Games	Caracas, Venezuela	10th (h)	400 m	46.72
1983	Pan American Games	Caracas, Venezuela	2nd	4 × 400 m relay	3:02.79
1983	Ibero-American Championships	Barcelona, Spain	3rd	200 m	21.56
1983	Ibero-American Championships	Barcelona, Spain	2nd	4 × 400 m relay	3:07.62
1983	South American Championships	Santa Fe, Argentina	2nd	400 m	47.4
1983	South American Championships	Santa Fe, Argentina	1st	4 × 400 m relay	3:10.8
1984	Olympic Games	Los Angeles, United States	51st (qf)	400 m	47.55
