= Vladimir Prosin =

Russian sprinter

Personal information
- Born: 15 August 1959 (age 67)
- Height: 1.86 m (6 ft 1 in)
- Weight: 75 kg (165 lb)

Sport
- Sport: Athletics
- Event: 400 metres
Medal record
Men's athletics
Representing Soviet Union
European Championships
Bronze medal – third place	1986 Stuttgart	4×400 m relay
Summer Universiade
Silver medal – second place	1985 Kobe	4x400 m relay
Bronze medal – third place	1987 Zagreb	4x400 m relay

Vladimir Prosin (Cyrillic: Владимир Просин; born 15 August 1959) is a retired Russian sprinter specialising in the 400 metres who competed for the Soviet Union. He took part at the 1987 World Championships and the 1991 World Indoor Championships.

His personal bests in the event is 45.47 outdoors (Kiev 1984) and 46.95 seconds indoors (Volgograd 1988).

== International competitions ==
Year	Competition	Venue	Position	Event	Notes
Representing the Soviet Union
1982	European Championships	Athens, Greece	2nd (h)	4 × 400 m relay	3:02.98
1985	Universiade	Kobe, Japan	6th	400 m	46.49
1985	Universiade	Kobe, Japan	2nd	4 × 400 m relay	3:02.66
1985	World Cup	Canberra, Australia	5th	4 × 400 m relay	3:03.17
1986	Goodwill Games	Moscow, Soviet Union	7th	400 m	45.94
1986	Goodwill Games	Moscow, Soviet Union	1st	4 × 400 m relay	3:01.25
1986	European Championships	Stuttgart, West Germany	13th (h)	400 m	46.32
1986	European Championships	Stuttgart, West Germany	3rd	4 × 400 m relay	3:00.47
1987	Universiade	Zagreb, Yugoslavia	5th	400 m	45.91
1987	World Championships	Rome, Italy	23rd (qf)	400 m	45.94
1987	World Championships	Rome, Italy	7th (sf)	4 × 400 m relay	3:01.61^{1}
1990	Goodwill Games	Seattle, United States	4th	4 × 400 m relay	3:04.64
1991	World Indoor Championships	Seville, Spain	5th	4 × 400 m relay	3:09.20

^{1}Did not finish in the final
