= Gérson de Souza =

Brazilian sprinter (born 1959)

Personal information
- Full name: Gérson Andrade de Souza
- Born: 2 January 1959 (age 67) São Paulo, Brazil
- Height: 1.76 m (5 ft 9 in)
- Weight: 74 kg (163 lb)

Sport
- Sport: Sprinting
- Event: 400 metres
- Club: AAG
Medal record
Representing Brazil
Pan American Games
Silver medal – second place	1983 Caracas	4x400m relay
Bronze medal – third place	1983 Caracas	400m
Bronze medal – third place	1983 Caracas	4x100m relay
Summer Universiade
Bronze medal – third place	1981 Bucharest	400m
Bronze medal – third place	1981 Bucharest	4x400m relay

Gérson Andrade de Souza (born 2 January 1959) is a Brazilian sprinter. He competed in the 400 metres at the 1984 Summer Olympics and the 1988 Summer Olympics.

His personal best in the event is 45.21 set in Rieti in 1982.

== International competitions ==
Year	Competition	Venue	Position	Event	Notes
Representing Brazil
1981	Universiade	Bucharest, Romania	3rd	400 m	45.91
1981	Universiade	Bucharest, Romania	3rd	4 × 400 m relay	3:06.79
1981	South American Championships	La Paz, Bolivia	2nd	400 m	47.8
1981	South American Championships	La Paz, Bolivia	1st	4 × 400 m relay	3:09.5
1983	Universiade	Edmonton, Canada	6th	400 m	46.03
1983	Pan American Games	Caracas, Venezuela	3rd	400 m	45.45
1983	Pan American Games	Caracas, Venezuela	3rd	4 × 100 m relay	39.08
1983	Pan American Games	Caracas, Venezuela	2nd	4 × 400 m relay	3:02.79
1983	World Championships	Helsinki, Finland	8th	400 m	45.91
1983	World Championships	Helsinki, Finland	6th (sf)	4 × 400 m relay	3:04.46
1984	Olympic Games	Los Angeles, United States	30th (qf)	400 m	46.65
1984	Olympic Games	Los Angeles, United States	8th (sf)	4 × 400 m relay	3:03:99
1987	Pan American Games	Indianapolis, United States	9th (h)	400 m	46.79
1987	Pan American Games	Indianapolis, United States	4th	4 × 400 m relay	3:08.21
1987	World Championships	Rome, Italy	27th (qf)	400 m	46.46
1987	World Championships	Rome, Italy	19th (h)	4 × 400 m relay	3:05.64
1987	South American Championships	São Paulo, Brazil	2nd	400 m	46.26
1987	South American Championships	São Paulo, Brazil	2nd	4 × 400 m relay	3:08.43
1988	Ibero-American Championships	Mexico City, Mexico	1st	400 m	45.28
1988	Olympic Games	Seoul, South Korea	12th (sf)	400 m	45.27
1989	World Indoor Championships	Budapest, Hungary	26th (h)	400 m	49.04
