= Gerardo Suero (athlete) =

Dominican Republic athlete

Personal information
- Full name: Gerardo N. Suero Correa
- Nationality: Dominican
- Born: 24 August 1957 (age 68)
- Height: 1.77 m (5 ft 10 in)
- Weight: 65 kg (143 lb)

Sport
- Sport: Sprinting
- Event: 100 metres

Gerardo N. Suero Correa (born 24 August 1957) is a Dominican Republic sprinter. He competed in the men's 100 metres at the 1980 Summer Olympics.

== International competitions ==
Year	Competition	Venue	Position	Event	Notes
Representing the Dominican Republic
1978	Central American and Caribbean Games	Medellín, Colombia	6th	100 m	10.49
1979	Central American and Caribbean Championships	Guadalajara, Mexico	2nd	100 m	10.53
1979	Central American and Caribbean Championships	Guadalajara, Mexico	1st	4 × 100 m relay	40.02
1979	Pan American Games	San Juan, Puerto Rico	16th (sf)	100 m	10.73
1979	Pan American Games	San Juan, Puerto Rico	–	4 × 100 m relay	DQ
1980	Olympic Games	Moscow, Soviet Union	27th (qf)	100 m	10.57
1980	Olympic Games	Moscow, Soviet Union	31st (qf)	200 m	21.75
1982	Central American and Caribbean Games	Havana, Cuba	8th	100 m	10.66
1982	Central American and Caribbean Games	Havana, Cuba	3rd	4 × 100 m relay	40.11
1986	Central American and Caribbean Games	Santiago, Dominican Republic	8th	100 m	10.95
1986	Central American and Caribbean Games	Santiago, Dominican Republic	3rd	4 × 100 m relay	39.56
1987	Pan American Games	Indianapolis, United States	16th (sf)	100 m	10.47
1987	Pan American Games	Indianapolis, United States	6th	4 × 100 m relay	40.53
1992	Ibero-American Championships	Seville, Spain	7th	4 × 100 m relay	42.06

== Personal bests ==
- 100 metres – 10.1 (1986)
- 200 metres – 21.30 (1979)
