= Sergio Querol =

Cuban sprinter (born 1965)

Personal information
- Born: 12 April 1965 (age 61)

Sport
- Sport: Track and field
Medal record
Representing Cuba
Summer Universiade
Gold medal – first place	1985 Kobe	4x100m relay
Central American and Caribbean Games
Gold medal – first place	1986 Santiago	4x100m relay
Pan American Games
Silver medal – second place	1987 Indianapolis	4x100m relay

Maximo Sergio Querol Abreu (born 12 April 1965) is a former Cuban sprinter.

== International competitions ==
Year	Competition	Venue	Position	Event	Notes
Representing Cuba
1985	Universiade	Kobe, Japan	11th (sf)	200 m	21.47
1985	Universiade	Kobe, Japan	1st	4 × 100 m relay	38.76
1986	Central American and Caribbean Games	Santiago, Dominican Republic	5th	200 m	21.05
1986	Central American and Caribbean Games	Santiago, Dominican Republic	1st	4 × 100 m relay	38.74
1986	Ibero-American Championships	Havana, Cuba	7th	200 m	21.65
1986	Ibero-American Championships	Havana, Cuba	2nd	4 × 100 m relay	39.46
1987	Pan American Games	Indianapolis, United States	2nd	4 × 100 m relay	38.86
1987	World Championships	Rome, Italy	27th (qf)	200 m	21.37
1987	World Championships	Rome, Italy	8th (sf)	4 × 100 m relay	39.08
1988	Ibero-American Championships	Mexico City, Mexico	2nd (extra)	200 m	20.96
1988	Ibero-American Championships	Mexico City, Mexico	1st	4 × 100 m relay	38.86
