= Sunday Olweny =

Ugandan sprinter

Personal information
- Nationality: Ugandan
- Born: 21 March 1967 (age 59)

Sport
- Sport: Sprinting
- Event: 200 metres

Sunday Olweny (born 21 March 1967) is a Ugandan sprinter. He competed in the men's 200 metres at the 1988 Summer Olympics.
