= Yang Yanqin =

Chinese shot putter (born 1966)

Personal information
- Born: August 28, 1966 (age 59)

Sport
- Sport: Track and field
Medal record
Representing China
Summer Universiade
Silver medal – second place	1985 Kobe	Shot put

Yang Yanqin (simplified Chinese: 杨彦芹; traditional Chinese: 楊彥芹; pinyin: Yáng Yànqín; born August 28, 1966) is a former female shot put athlete from China. She competed at the 1984 Summer Olympics in Los Angeles, finishing in tenth place (16.97 metres) in the overall-rankings. She was the youngest member (17 years, 341 days) at those Games of the Chinese track and field delegation.
