= Leandro Peñalver =

Cuban sprinter (born 1961)

Personal information
- Born: May 23, 1961 (age 65) Matanzas, Cuba

Sport
- Country: Cuba
- Sport: Men's athletics
Medal record
World Championships
Bronze medal – third place	1987 Rome	4 x 400 m relay
Pan American Games
Gold medal – first place	1983 Caracas	100 metres
Gold medal – first place	1991 Havana	4 x 100 m relay
Silver medal – second place	1983 Caracas	200 metres
Silver medal – second place	1983 Caracas	4 x 100 m relay
Central American and Caribbean Games
Gold medal – first place	1982 Havana	100 metres
Gold medal – first place	1982 Havana	200 metres
Gold medal – first place	1986 Santiago	200 metres
Summer Universiade
Gold medal – first place	1985 Kobe	200 metres
Gold medal – first place	1985 Kobe	4 x 100 m relay
Gold medal – first place	1985 Kobe	4 x 400 m relay
Representing Americas
World Cup
Silver medal – second place	1985 Canberra	4 x 100 m relay

Leandro Santiago Peñalver González (born May 23, 1961, in Matanzas) is a retired Cuban athlete who competed in the sprints. His personal best is 10.06 seconds, achieved in Caracas in 1983. Despite having much international success, he never competed in the Olympics, as Cuba boycotted both the 1984 Summer Olympics and the 1988 Summer Olympics.

== International competitions ==
Representing Cuba
Year	Competition	Venue	Position	Event	Notes
1981	Universiade	Bucharest, Romania	18th (h)	100 m	10.81
1981	Universiade	Bucharest, Romania	19th (sf)	200 m	21.83
1981	Universiade	Bucharest, Romania	4th	4 × 100 m relay	39.58
1982	Central American and Caribbean Games	Havana, Cuba	1st	100 m	10.16
1982	Central American and Caribbean Games	Havana, Cuba	1st	200 m	20.42
1982	Central American and Caribbean Games	Havana, Cuba	1st	4 × 100 m relay	39.15
1983	Pan American Games	Caracas, Venezuela	1st	100 m	10.06
1983	Pan American Games	Caracas, Venezuela	2nd	200 m	20.53
1983	Pan American Games	Caracas, Venezuela	2nd	4 × 100 m relay	38.55
1983	World Championships	Helsinki, Finland	15th (sf)	100 m	10.47
1984	Friendship Games	Moscow, Soviet Union	3rd	100 m	10.21
1984	Friendship Games	Moscow, Soviet Union	4th	200 m	20.65
1984	Friendship Games	Moscow, Soviet Union	2nd	4 × 100 m relay	38.79
1985	Central American and Caribbean Championships	Nassau, Bahamas	1st	200 m	20.56
1985	Central American and Caribbean Championships	Nassau, Bahamas	1st	4 × 100 m relay	39.17
1985	Central American and Caribbean Championships	Nassau, Bahamas	1st	4 × 400 m relay	3:03.38
1985	Universiade	Kobe, Japan	1st	200 m	20.57
1985	Universiade	Kobe, Japan	1st	4 × 100 m relay	38.76
1985	Universiade	Kobe, Japan	1st	4 × 400 m relay	3:02.20
1985	World Cup	Canberra, Australia	2nd	4 × 100 m relay	38.31^{1}
1985	World Cup	Canberra, Australia	6th	4 × 400 m relay	3:03.52^{1}
1986	Central American and Caribbean Games	Santiago, Dominican Republic	1st	200 m	20.70
1986	Central American and Caribbean Games	Santiago, Dominican Republic	1st	4 × 100 m relay	38.74
1986	Central American and Caribbean Games	Santiago, Dominican Republic	1st	4 × 400 m relay	3:02.41
1987	World Indoor Championships	Indianapolis, United States	13th (sf)	200 m	21.95
1987	Pan American Games	Indianapolis, United States	4th	100 m	10.53
1987	Pan American Games	Indianapolis, United States	4th	200 m	20.73
1987	Pan American Games	Indianapolis, United States	2nd	4 × 100 m relay	38.86
1987	Pan American Games	Indianapolis, United States	2nd	4 × 400 m relay	2:59.72
1987	World Championships	Rome, Italy	36th (h)	100 m	10.65
1987	World Championships	Rome, Italy	8th (sf)	4 × 100 m relay	39.08
1987	World Championships	Rome, Italy	3rd	4 × 400 m relay	2:59.16
1988	Ibero-American Championships	Mexico City, Mexico	2nd	100 m	10.12
1988	Ibero-American Championships	Mexico City, Mexico	2nd	200 m	20.12
1988	Ibero-American Championships	Mexico City, Mexico	1st	4 × 100 m relay	38.86
1990	Goodwill Games	Seattle, United States	2nd	4 × 100 m relay	38.49
1990	Central American and Caribbean Games	Mexico City, Mexico	1st	4 × 100 m relay	39.09
1990	Central American and Caribbean Games	Mexico City, Mexico	3rd	4 × 400 m relay	3:06.17
1991	Pan American Games	Havana, Cuba	1st	4 × 100 m relay	39.08
1991	World Championships	Tokyo, Japan	10th (h)	4 × 100 m relay	39.15

^{1} Representing the Americas
