= List of ambassadors of Eswatini to Taiwan =

Coordinates: 25.117229°N 121.524092°E

Ambassador of Eswatini to Taiwan
- Embassy of Eswatini in Taipei
- Incumbent; Promise Sithembiso Msibi since May 24, 2022
- Inaugural holder: David Dlamini
- Formation: December 1, 1990

The Eswatini Ambassador in Taipei is the official representative of the Government in Mbabane to the Government of Taiwan.

== History ==
- In 6 September 1968 diplomatic relations between the governments of Eswatini and the Republic of China were established, when the Embassy of the Republic of China was installed in Mbabane.

== List of representatives ==
| diplomatic agreement/designated/Diplomatic accreditation | ambassador | Chinese language | Observations | List of monarchs of Swaziland | Term end |
|---|---|---|---|---|---|
| September 6, 1968 | | | The Kingdom of Swaziland was briefly a Protected State until Britain granted it independence in 1968, when the governments in Mbane and Taipei established diplomatic relations. | Sobhuza II | |
| October 25, 1971 | | | The government of Swaziland supported the Republic of China's "China" seat in the United Nations at the United Nations General Assembly. | Sobhuza II | |
| December 1, 1990 | David Dlamini | 德維‧德拉米尼 | Residence in Seoul (South Korea) | Mswati III | October 1, 1996 |
| April 1, 1997 | Clifford Sibusiso Mamba | 克里福德．西布西索．曼巴 | Residence in Seoul (South Korea) | Mswati III | October 1, 1999 |
| January 26, 2000 | | | The Swazi government set up an embassy in Taipei. | Mswati III | |
| January 1, 2000 | Moses Mathendele Dlamini | 摩西斯‧馬聖德‧德拉米尼 | | Mswati III | January 1, 2004 |
| March 1, 2005 | Njabuliso Busisiwe Sikhulile Gwebu | 賈布黎索．桂布 | 2017 Swasi ambassador to the United States. | Mswati III | April 1, 2014 |
| May 1, 2014 | Thamie Dlamini | 塔米．戴敏尼 | | Mswati III | May, 2022 |
| May 24, 2022 | Promise Sithembiso Msibi | 蒙西比 | | Mswati III | Present |
