= Eddie Carey =

American sprinter

Personal information
- Nationality: American
- Born: May 11, 1960 (age 66)

Sport
- Sport: Athletics
- Event: Sprints / 400m
Medal record
Men's athletics
Representing the United States
Pan American Games
Gold medal – first place	1983 Caracas	4 x 400 m relay

Eddie Carey (born May 11, 1960) is an American former sprinter.

== Biography ==
Carey competed for the UC Irvine Anteaters track and field team in the NCAA.

Carey finished second behind Darren Clark in the 400 metres event at the British 1983 AAA Championships.

He is the girls cross country and track coach of a small high school.
