= Carlos Reyté =

Cuban sprinter

Personal information
- Born: 12 January 1956 (age 70)
- Height: 1.72 m (5 ft 8 in)
- Weight: 66 kg (146 lb)

Sport
- Sport: Athletics
- Event: 400 metres
Medal record
Representing Cuba
Pan American Games
Bronze medal – third place	1983 Caracas	4x400m relay
Central American and Caribbean Games
Gold medal – first place	1982 Havana	4x400m relay
Bronze medal – third place	1982 Havana	400m

Carlos Reyté García (born 12 January 1956) is a retired Cuban sprinter.

== International competitions ==
Year	Competition	Venue	Position	Event	Notes
Representing Cuba
1981	Central American and Caribbean Championships	Santo Domingo, Dominican Republic	3rd	4 × 400 m relay	3:08.34
1981	Universiade	Bucharest, Romania	4th	400 m	46.10
1981	Universiade	Bucharest, Romania	4th	4 × 400 m relay	3:08.58
1982	Central American and Caribbean Games	Havana, Cuba	3rd	400 m	46.34
1982	Central American and Caribbean Games	Havana, Cuba	1st	4 × 400 m relay	3:03.59
1983	Central American and Caribbean Championships	Havana, Cuba	1st	4 × 400 m relay	3:05.12
1983	Pan American Games	Caracas, Venezuela	5th	400 m	45.78
1983	Pan American Games	Caracas, Venezuela	3rd	4 × 400 m relay	3:03.15
1984	Friendship Games	Moscow, Soviet Union	4th	400 m	46.01
1984	Friendship Games	Moscow, Soviet Union	3rd	4 × 400 m relay	3:04.76
1985	World Indoor Games	Paris, France	12th (sf)	400 m	49.39

== Personal bests ==
Outdoor

- 400 metres – 45.50 (Havana 1985)

Indoor

- 400 metres – 49.39 (Paris 1985)
