= Aaron Phillips (athlete) =

Venezuelan sprinter (born 1965)

Personal information
- Full name: Aaron Gerardo Phillips
- Born: 11 March 1965 (age 61) Maracaibo, Venezuela
- Education: Abilene Christian University

Sport
- Sport: Athletics
- Event: 400 metres

Aaron Gerardo Phillips (born 11 March 1965) is a retired Venezuelan sprinter who specialised in the 400 metres. He won several medals at regional level.

== International competitions ==
Year	Competition	Venue	Position	Event	Notes
Representing Venezuela
1979	South American Youth Championships	Cochabamba, Bolivia	2nd	800 m	2:02.4
1979	South American Youth Championships	Cochabamba, Bolivia	2nd	4 × 400 m relay	3:28.6
1980	Central American and Caribbean; Junior Championships (U17)	Nassau, Bahamas	2nd	400 m	49.4
1980	Central American and Caribbean; Junior Championships (U17)	Nassau, Bahamas	1st	800 m	1:57.8
1980	Central American and Caribbean; Junior Championships (U17)	Nassau, Bahamas	1st	4 × 400 m relay	3:24.9
1980	Pan American Junior Championships	Greater Sudbury, Canada	3rd	4 × 400 m relay	3:16.59
1981	South American Junior Championships	Rio de Janeiro, Brazil	2nd	4 × 400 m relay	3:14.6
1983	South American Junior Championships	Medellín, Colombia	2nd	800 m	1:51.39
1983	South American Junior Championships	Medellín, Colombia	4th	4 × 400 m relay	3:23.01
1983	Central American and Caribbean Championships	Havana, Cuba	3rd	4 × 400 m relay	3:08.56
1983	Pan American Games	Caracas, Venezuela	7th	400 m	46.68
1983	Pan American Games	Caracas, Venezuela	5th	4 × 400 m relay	3:06.50
1984	Central American and Caribbean; Junior Championships (U20)	San Juan, Puerto Rico	1st	400 m	46.77
1984	Central American and Caribbean; Junior Championships (U20)	San Juan, Puerto Rico	3rd	4 × 400 m relay	3:14.14
1985	South American Championships	Santiago, Chile	3rd	400 m	46.66
1985	South American Championships	Santiago, Chile	3rd	4 × 400 m relay	3:11.29
1987	Central American and Caribbean Championships	Caracas, Venezuela	2nd	4 × 400 m relay	3:05.15
1987	Pan American Games	Indianapolis, United States	10th (sf)	400 m	47.15
1987	Pan American Games	Indianapolis, United States	5th	4 × 400 m relay	3:08.63
1988	Ibero-American Championships	Mexico City, Mexico	5th (extra)	400 m	47.29

== Personal bests ==
Outdoor

- 400 metres – 46.20 (Caracas 1984)

Indoor

- 400 metres – 46.96* (Lubbock 1989)

*Oversized track
