= Ricardo Chacón =

Cuban sprinter

Personal information
- Born: 30 April 1963 (age 63)

Sport
- Sport: Athletics
- Events: 100 m, 200 m
Medal record
Representing Cuba
Summer Universiade
Gold medal – first place	1985 Kobe	4x100m relay
Pan American Games
Silver medal – second place	1987 Indianapolis	4x100m relay

Ricardo Chacón Abreu (born 30 April 1963) is a retired Cuban sprinter. He represented his country at one outdoor and two indoor World Championships.

== International competitions ==
Year	Competition	Venue	Position	Event	Notes
Representing Cuba
1985	Universiade	Kobe, Japan	7th	100 m	10.43
1985	Universiade	Kobe, Japan	1st	4 × 100 m relay	38.76
1986	Ibero-American Championships	Havana, Cuba	3rd	100 m	10.36
1986	Ibero-American Championships	Havana, Cuba	2nd	4 × 100 m relay	39.46
1987	World Indoor Championships	Indianapolis, United States	21st (h)	60 m	6.79
1987	Pan American Games	Indianapolis, United States	2nd	4 × 100 m relay	38.86
1987	World Championships	Rome, Italy	31st (qf)	100 m	10.70
1987	World Championships	Rome, Italy	8th (sf)	4 × 100 m relay	39.08
1988	Ibero-American Championships	Mexico City, Mexico	1st (extra)	100 m	10.36
1989	World Indoor Championships	Budapest, Hungary	7th (sf)	60 m	6.59
1989	Universiade	Duisburg, West Germany	16th (sf)	100 m	10.82

== Personal bests ==
Outdoor

- 100 metres – 10.21 (+0.3 m/s, Havana 1987)
- 200 metres – 20.86 (+1.9 m/s, Sofia 1989)

Indoor

- 60 metres – 6.57 (Oviedo 1989)
