= 1988 European Athletics Indoor Championships – Men's 400 metres =

The men's 400 metres event at the 1988 European Athletics Indoor Championships was held on 5 and 6 March.

== Medalists ==
Gold	Silver	Bronze
Jens Carlowitz; East Germany	Brian Whittle; Great Britain	Ralf Lübke; West Germany

== Results ==
=== Heats ===
First 2 from each heat (Q) and the next 4 fastest (q) qualified for the semifinals.

Rank	Heat	Name	Nationality	Time	Notes
1	1	Ralf Lübke	West Germany	46.83	Q
2	2	Brian Whittle	Great Britain	46.93	Q
3	2	Thomas Schönlebe	East Germany	46.96	Q
4	2	Ángel Heras	Spain	46.98	q
5	3	Gusztáv Menczer	Hungary	47.06	Q
6	3	Jens Carlowitz	East Germany	47.07	Q
7	1	Željko Knapić	Yugoslavia	47.15	Q
8	4	Vito Petrella	Italy	47.28	Q
9	3	Ulf Sedlacek	Sweden	47.29	q
10	4	Antonio Sánchez	Spain	47.32	Q
11	4	Klaus Ehrle	Austria	47.39	q
12	1	Danilo Bertaggia	Italy	47.45	q
13	2	Ervin Katona	Hungary	47.46	
14	3	Alessandro Pinna	Italy	47.50	
15	4	Mark Thomas	Great Britain	47.83	
16	3	José Alonso	Spain	47.84	
17	1	Peter Sinclair	Ireland	48.62	
18	4	Manlio Molinari	San Marino	49.14	=NR
	1	Fethi Bildirici	Turkey	DQ	

=== Semifinals ===
First 3 from each semifinal qualified directly (Q) for the final.

Rank	Heat	Name	Nationality	Time	Notes
1	1	Ralf Lübke	West Germany	46.66	Q
2	1	Jens Carlowitz	East Germany	46.77	Q
3	2	Brian Whittle	Great Britain	46.86	Q
4	2	Thomas Schönlebe	East Germany	46.86	Q
5	2	Antonio Sánchez	Spain	46.97	Q
6	1	Vito Petrella	Italy	47.09	Q
7	2	Gusztáv Menczer	Hungary	47.13	
8	1	Klaus Ehrle	Austria	47.36	
9	2	Danilo Bertaggia	Italy	47.55	
10	2	Željko Knapić	Yugoslavia	47.56	
11	1	Ulf Sedlacek	Sweden	47.60	
12	1	Ángel Heras	Spain	47.70	

=== Final ===
Rank	Lane	Name	Nationality	Time	Notes
1st place, gold medalist(s)	4	Jens Carlowitz	East Germany	45.63	
2nd place, silver medalist(s)	5	Brian Whittle	Great Britain	45.98	
3rd place, bronze medalist(s)	3	Ralf Lübke	West Germany	45.98	
4	6	Antonio Sánchez	Spain	46.49	
5	1	Vito Petrella	Italy	47.73	
	2	Thomas Schönlebe	East Germany	DNS	
