= Mike Dwyer (athlete) =

Canadian athlete (born 1962)

Personal information
- Born: Michael Dwyer; 10 October 1962 (age 63) Jamaica

Sport
- Country: Canada
- Sport: Athletics
- Event: Sprints
Medal record
Universiade
Silver medal – second place	1985 Kobe	4x100m relay
Pan American Games
Silver medal – second place	1991 Havana	4x100m relay

Michael Dwyer (born 10 October 1962) is a Canadian former athlete who competed in sprint events.

Born in Jamaica, Dwyer came to Canada as a teenager in 1976.

Dwyer had a personal best time in the 200m of 20.83 and won a bronze medal for the 200m at the 1985 Pacific Conference Games. He was sixth in the same event at the 1986 Commonwealth Games.

As a 4 × 100 m relay runner he was a member of silver medal-winning teams at the 1985 Summer Universiade and 1991 Pan American Games. He was fourth in the 4 × 100 m relay at the 1987 World Championships, running with Ben Johnson, Atlee Mahorn and Desai Williams.
