= Anatole Zongo Kuyo =

Ivorian sprinter

Personal information
- Nationality: Ivorian
- Born: 20 January 1963 (age 63)

Sport
- Sport: Sprinting
- Event: 4 × 400 metres relay
Medal record
Men's athletics
Representing Ivory Coast
African Championships
Silver medal – second place	1988 Annaba	4×400 m

Anatole Zongo Kuyo (born 20 January 1963) is an Ivorian sprinter. He competed in the men's 4 × 400 metres relay at the 1988 Summer Olympics.
