= Visut Watanasin =

Thai sprinter (born 1964)

Personal information
- Born: 20 November 1964 (age 61)

Sport
- Sport: Track and field
Medal record
Representing Thailand
Asian Championships
Silver medal – second place	1991 Kuala Lumpur	4×100 m
Silver medal – second place	1995 Jakarta	4×100 m
Bronze medal – third place	1993 Manila	4×100 m

Visut Watanasin or วิสุทธิ์ วัฒนสิน (born 20 November 1964) is a former Thai sprinter who competed in the men's 100m competition at the 1992 Summer Olympics. He recorded a 10.72, not enough to qualify for the next round past the heats. His personal best is 10.53, set in 1987. In 1988, in the same discipline, he recorded a 10.88. In both Olympiads, he ran for the Thai 4 × 100 m relay team.
