= James Rolle =

American sprinter (born 1964)

James Rolle (born February 2, 1964) is an American former sprinter. He won the gold medal in the 4 × 400 metres relay at the 1983 Pan American Games.
