= Cheick Seynou =

Burkinabé high jumper

Personal information
- Nationality: Burkinabé
- Born: 1967 (age 58–59)

Sport
- Sport: Athletics
- Event: High jump

Cheick Seynou (born 1967) is a Burkinabé athlete. He competed in the men's high jump at the 1988 Summer Olympics.
