= Yevgeniy Lomtyev =

Soviet sprinter (born 1961)

Personal information
- Born: 20 October 1961 (age 64) Umyotsky District, Soviet Union

Sport
- Sport: Athletics
- Event: 400 metres
Medal record
Representing Soviet Union
European Indoor Championships
Gold medal – first place	1983 Budapest	400m
Summer Universiade
Silver medal – second place	1983 Edmonton	4x400m relay
Silver medal – second place	1985 Kobe	4x400m relay

Yevgeniy Lomtyev (Russian: Евгений Ломтев; born 20 October 1961) is a retired Soviet sprinter who specialised in the 400 metres. He won the gold medal at the 1983 European Indoor Championships. In addition he won silver medals in the 4 × 400 metres relay at the 1983 and 1985 Summer Universiade.

His personal bests in the 400 metres are 45.05 seconds outdoors (Kiev 1984) and 46.20 seconds indoors (Budapest 1983).

== International competitions ==
Year	Competition	Venue	Position	Event	Notes
Representing the Soviet Union
1983	European Indoor Championships	Budapest, Hungary	1st	400 m	46.20
1983	Universiade	Edmonton, Canada	2nd	4 × 400 m relay	3:01.58
1984	Friendship Games	Moscow, Soviet Union	1st	4 × 400 m relay	3:00.16
1985	Universiade	Kobe, Japan	2nd	4 × 400 m relay	3:02.66
1987	World Championships	Rome, Italy	7th (sf)	4 × 400 m relay	3:01.61^{1}
1990	Goodwill Games	Seattle, United States	6th	400 m	46.93
1990	Goodwill Games	Seattle, United States	4th	4 × 400 m relay	3:04.64

^{1}Did not finish in the final
