= Alexandre Yougbare =

Burkinabé sprinter

Personal information
- Nationality: Burkinabé
- Born: 1964 (age 61–62)

Sport
- Sport: Sprinting
- Event: 100 metres

Alexandre Yougbare (born 1964) is a Burkinabé sprinter. He competed in the men's 100 metres at the 1988 Summer Olympics.
