= Dušan Malovec =

Czech sprinter (born 1957)

Personal information
- Nationality: Slovak
- Born: 1 July 1957 (age 69)

Sport
- Sport: Sprinting
- Event: 4 × 400 metres relay

Dušan Malovec (born 1 July 1957) is a Slovak sprinter. He competed in the men's 4 × 400 metres relay at the 1980 Summer Olympics.
