= Jailto Bonfim =

Brazilian sprinter

Personal information
- Full name: Jailto dos Santos Bonfim
- Born: 4 January 1964 (age 62) Rio de Janeiro, Brazil
- Height: 1.85 m (6 ft 1 in)
- Weight: 78 kg (172 lb)

Sport
- Sport: Sprinting
- Event: 100 metres
- Club: PEAC

Jailto dos Santos Bonfim (born 4 January 1964) is a Brazilian sprinter. He competed in the men's 100 metres at the 1988 Summer Olympics.

His brother Joilto Bonfim was a hurdler.
