= Damel Flowers =

Belizean sprinter

Personal information
- Nationality: Belizean
- Born: 28 October 1960 (age 65)

Sport
- Sport: Sprinting
- Event: 200 metres

Damel Flowers (born 28 October 1960) is a Belizean sprinter. He competed in the men's 200 metres at the 1984 Summer Olympics.
