= Kenji Yamauchi =

Japanese sprinter

Personal information
- Nationality: Japanese
- Born: 10 August 1964 (age 61)

Sport
- Sport: Sprinting
- Event: 200 metres
Medal record
Men's athletics
Representing Japan
Asian Games
Gold medal – first place	1986 Seoul	4x400 m relay
Asian Championships
Silver medal – second place	1985 Jakarta	4×400 m relay

Kenji Yamauchi (山内 健次, Yamauchi Kenji; born 10 August 1964) is a Japanese sprinter. He competed in the men's 200 metres, the men's 4 x 100 meters relay, and the men's 4 x 400 meters relay events at the 1988 Summer Olympics.
