= Harouna Pale =

Burkinabé sprinter

Personal information
- Nationality: Burkinabé
- Born: 16 August 1957 (age 68)

Sport
- Sport: Sprinting
- Event: 100 metres

Harouna Pale (born 16 August 1957) is a Burkinabé sprinter. He competed in the men's 100 metres at the 1988 Summer Olympics.
