= Oliver Daniels =

Liberian sprinter

Personal information
- Nationality: Liberian
- Born: 19 January 1964 (age 62)

Sport
- Sport: Sprinting
- Event: 100 metres

Oliver Daniels (born 19 January 1964) is a Liberian sprinter. He competed in the 100 metres at the 1984 Summer Olympics and the 1988 Summer Olympics. Personal Bests: 100m – 10.34 (1990); 200m – 21.04 (1990).
