= Shim Duk-sup =

South Korean sprinter

Personal information
- Nationality: South Korean
- Born: 26 November 1963 (age 62)

Sport
- Sport: Sprinting
- Event: 100 metres
Medal record
Men's athletics
Representing South Korea
Asian Games
Bronze medal – third place	1986 Seoul	4x100 m relay
Asian Championships
Bronze medal – third place	1985 Jakarta	4×100 m relay

Shim Duk-sup (born 26 November 1963) is a South Korean sprinter. He competed in the 100 metres at the 1984 Summer Olympics and the 1988 Summer Olympics.
