= Lee Vernon McNeill =

American track and field athlete (1964–2021)

Lee McNeill
Personal information
- Full name: Lee Vernon McNeill
- Born: December 2, 1964 Lumberton, North Carolina, U.S.
- Died: September 29, 2021 (aged 56) Fayetteville, North Carolina, U.S.
- Height: 5 ft 5 in (1.65 m)
- Weight: 143 lb (65 kg)
Medal record
Men's athletics
World Championships
Gold medal – first place	1987 Rome	4 × 100 m relay
Pan American Games
Gold medal – first place	1987 Indianapolis	4x100m relay
Summer Universiade
Bronze medal – third place	1985 Kobe	100 metres
Bronze medal – third place	1985 Kobe	4x100m relay

Lee Vernon McNeill (December 2, 1964 – September 29, 2021) was an American track and field athlete who was a Five time All-American, record holding sprinter at East Carolina University.

== Career ==
Lee McNeill was recruited by Bill Carson 1984 out of St. Pauls for East Carolina University. He specialized in the 100 metres.

McNeill made a name for himself in 1985 when he defeated Olympic gold medalist Carl Lewis in the semifinals of the 100-meter dash at the USA outdoor track and field championships. McNeill placed second in the final, outrunning both the world record holder and the NCAA champion. Later that summer he dropped the baton in a Pan American Games relay, but still managed to bring home three bronze medals from the National Sports Festival and the World University Games. His first gold medal of the summer came in June at the U.S. Olympic Festival in Durham. McNeill also picked up a bronze medal in the 100-meter dash.

He won the gold medal in 4 × 100 metres relay at the 1987 World Championships, together with Lee McRae, Harvey Glance and Carl Lewis.

His personal best time over 100 metres is 10.09 seconds, achieved on June 17, 1988, in Tampa when finishing 3rd in The Athletics Congress final. McNeill teamed with Carl Lewis, Harvey Glance and Lee McRae to win the 4 × 100 relay in the Pan American Games. McNeill was a member of the 1988 Olympic team that competed in Seoul, South Korea.

=== Recognition ===
On April 18, 2010, McNeill was one of the six new inductees into the Robeson County Sports Hall of Fame ceremony in Pembroke, North Carolina.

== Personal life and death ==
McNeill lived in Greenville, North Carolina. He died from COVID-19 on September 29, 2021, during the COVID-19 pandemic in North Carolina. He struggled to breathe after being diagnosed with the virus in late August and had been hospitalized in the weeks before his death.
