= Koji Kurihara =

Japanese sprinter

Personal information
- Nationality: Japanese
- Born: 2 May 1964 (age 62)

Sport
- Sport: Sprinting
- Event: 100 metres

Koji Kurihara (栗原 浩司, Kurihara Kōji; born 2 May 1964) is a Japanese sprinter. He competed in the men's 100 metres at the 1988 Summer Olympics.
