= Clifford Sibusiso Mamba =

Swazi diplomat

Clifford Sibusiso Mamba Ambassador to the United Nations 2002 to 2005
- Born: Clifford; 5 May 1963 (age 62); Manzini
- Education: Middlesex University in the United Kingdom

Clifford Sibusiso Mamba (born 5 May 1963 in Manzini) is a Swazi diplomat and former Olympic athlete. Mamba competed for Swaziland at the 1984 Summer Olympics in the 100m and 200 m races.

== Education ==
Mamba earned a B.S. at Middlesex University in the United Kingdom.

== Diplomatic career ==
Following his education, Mamba became the ambassador to the European Union from 1991 to 1996. After leaving the European Union, Mamba became the ambassador to the Republic of Korea and Asia including a co-accreditation to Brunei, Japan, Singapore and Taiwan. From 2002 to 2005, Mamba was the ambassador to the United Nations from Swaziland.
