= Roberto Ramos (athlete) =

Cuban sprinter (born 1959)

Personal information
- Born: 6 August 1959 (age 66)

Sport
- Sport: Track and field
Medal record
Representing Cuba
Central American and Caribbean Games
Gold medal – first place	1982 Havana	4x400m relay
Summer Universiade
Gold medal – first place	1985 Kobe	4x400m relay

Roberto Néstor Ramos Montalvo (born 6 August 1959) is a Cuban former sprinter.
