= Atlee Mahorn =

Canadian sprinter (born 1965)

Personal information
- Full name: Atlee Anthony Mahorn
- Nationality: Canadian
- Born: 27 October 1965 (age 60) Clarendon, Jamaica

Sport
- Sport: Running
- Event(s): 100m, 200m, 400m

Achievements and titles
- Personal best(s): 100m: 10.18 (Tokyo 1991); 200m: 20.17s (Tokyo 1991); 400m: 45.62 (Tempe 1986)
Medal record
Men's athletics
Representing Canada
World Championships
Bronze medal – third place	1991 Tokyo	200 m
Bronze medal – third place	1993 Stuttgart	4 × 100 m relay
Commonwealth Games
Gold medal – first place	1986 Edinburgh	200 m
Universiade
Silver medal – second place	1985 Kobe	200 m

Atlee Anthony Mahorn (born 27 October 1965) is a three-time Canadian Olympic and four-time World Championship sprinter. He won bronze medals in the 200 metres at the 1991 World Championships in Tokyo and the 4 x 100 metre relay at the 1993 World Championships in Stuttgart. He won the gold medal in the 200m at the 1986 Commonwealth Games in Edinburgh.

His personal best time of 20.17 in the 200 metres was set in the semi-finals at the 1991 World Championships which was a Canadian record until Aaron Brown broke the record on 30 May 2014.

Born in Clarendon, Jamaica, Mahorn is a graduate of University of California, Berkeley and holds the school record 200 metres (20.20) plus the number two time at 100 metres (10.18) and the number four time at 400 metres (45.62). He received an MBA in International Business. Mahorn is fluent in the French language and can also communicate in both Spanish and Italian.

== Achievements ==
Year	Competition	Venue	Position	Event	Notes
Representing Canada
1983	World Championships	Helsinki, Finland	5th (q-finals)	200 m	21.13
1983	World Championships	Helsinki, Finland	DQ	4 × 100 m relay	
1984	Olympic Games	Los Angeles, United States	5th (semis)	200 m	20.77
1985	Universiade	Kobe, Japan	2nd	200 m	20.65
1986	Commonwealth Games	Edinburgh, Scotland	1st	200 m	20.31
1987	World Championships	Rome, Italy	8th	200 m	20.78
1987	World Championships	Rome, Italy	4th	4 × 100 m relay	38.47
1988	Olympic Games	Seoul, South Korea	5th	200 m	20.39
1988	Olympic Games	Seoul, South Korea	7th	4 × 100 m relay	38.93
1991	World Championships	Tokyo, Japan	6th (semis)	100 m	10.18
1991	World Championships	Tokyo, Japan	3rd	200 m	20.49
1992	Olympic Games	Barcelona, Spain	4th (q-finals)	200 m	20.78
1992	Olympic Games	Barcelona, Spain	DNF	4 × 100 m relay	
1993	World Championships	Stuttgart, Germany	5th (semis)	100 m	10.21
1993	World Championships	Stuttgart, Germany	7th (semis)	200 m	20.80
1993	World Championships	Stuttgart, Germany	3rd	4 × 100 m relay	37.83
