= Jang Jae-keun =

South Korean sprinter (born 1962)

Personal information
- Born: 2 January 1962 (age 64) Seoul, South Korea

Sport
- Sport: Track and field
Medal record
Representing South Korea
Asian Games
Gold medal – first place	1982 New Delhi	200 m
Gold medal – first place	1986 Seoul	200 m
Silver medal – second place	1982 New Delhi	100 m
Bronze medal – third place	1986 Seoul	4x100 m relay
Asian Championships
Gold medal – first place	1985 Jakarta	200 m
Bronze medal – third place	1983 Kuwait City	200 m
Bronze medal – third place	1985 Jakarta	100 m
Bronze medal – third place	1985 Jakarta	4×100 m
Summer Universiade
Bronze medal – third place	1985 Kobe	200 m

Jang Jae-Geun (born 2 January 1962) is a Korean former sprinter who competed in the 1984 Summer Olympics and in the 1988 Summer Olympics.

Jang was the first Korean sprinter to win a gold medal at the Asian Games. He was also the first Asian athletics medalist at the World University Games. He later became a coach at the Seoul City Hall.
