= Athletics at the 1985 Summer Universiade =

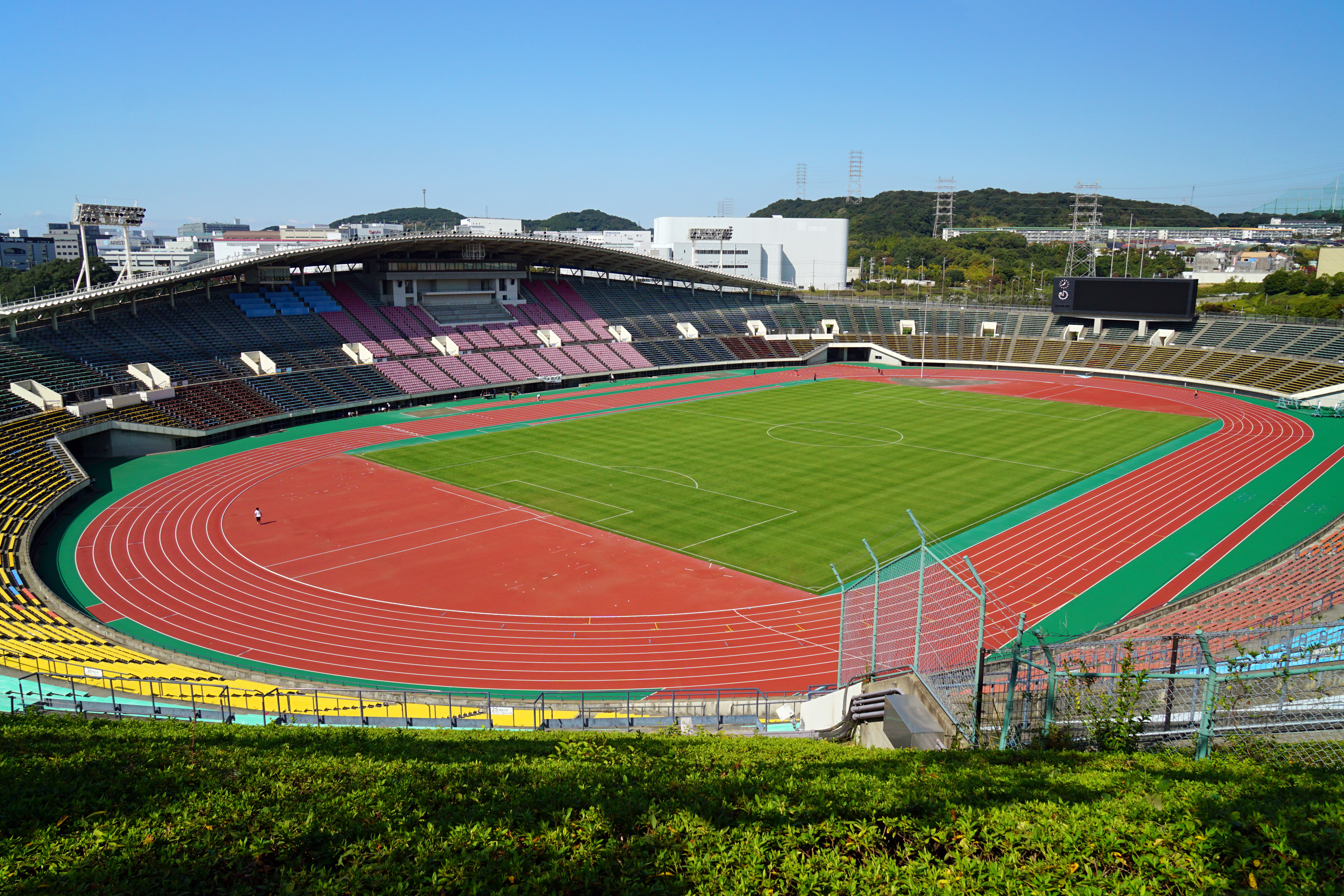
- Dates: August 29 – September 4, 1985
- Host city: Kobe, Japan
- Venue: Kobe Universiade Memorial Stadium
- Events: 42

Athletics events were contested at the 1985 Summer Universiade in Kobe, Japan between 29 August and 4 September. New events were women's 10,000 metres and 5000 metres walk.

== Medals summary ==
=== Men's events ===
Event	Gold		Silver		Bronze	
100 metres (wind: 0.0 m/s)	Chidi Imoh (NGR)	10.22	Andrés Simón (CUB)	10.28	Lee McNeill (USA)	10.33
200 metres (wind: +0.1 m/s)	Leandro Peñalver (CUB)	20.57	Atlee Mahorn (CAN)	20.65	Chang Jae-Keun (KOR)	20.78
400 metres	Innocent Egbunike (NGR)	45.10	Roberto Hernández (CUB)	45.41	Sunday Uti (NGR)	45.58
800 metres	Ryszard Ostrowski (POL)	1:44.38	Viktor Kalinkin (URS)	1:45.21	John Marshall (USA)	1:45.32
1500 metres	Chris McGeorge (GBR)	3:46.22	Adam Dixon (USA)	3:46.29	Dragan Zdravković (YUG)	3:46.78
5000 metres	Stefano Mei (ITA)	13:56.48	Carey Nelson (CAN)	13:57.77	Rob Lonergan (CAN)	13:58.02
10,000 metres	Keith Brantly (USA)	29:11.24	Jesús Herrera (MEX)	29:11.71	Shuichi Yoneshige (JPN)	29:11.73
Marathon	Orlando Pizzolato (ITA)	2:20:06	Salvatore Nicosia (ITA)	2:21:09	Paul Gompers (USA)	2:21:40
110 metres hurdles (wind: -0.7 m/s)	Cletus Clark (USA)	13.57	György Bakos (HUN)	13.72	Keith Talley (USA)	13.76
400 metres hurdles	Tagir Zemskov (URS)	49.38	Henry Amike (NGR)	49.70	René Djédjémel Mélédjé (CIV)	49.73
3000 metres steeplechase	Franco Boffi (ITA)	8:28.75	Eddie Wedderburn (GBR)	8:28.90	Hans Koeleman (NED)	8:32.19
4 × 100 metres relay	Cuba (CUB); Ricardo Chacón; Leandro Peñalver; Sergio Querol; Andrés Simón	38.76	Canada (CAN); Rick Jones; Mike Dwyer; Cyprian Enweani; Atlee Mahorn	39.07	United States (USA); Lee McNeill; Thomas Jefferson; Keith Talley; Mike Morris; Lorenzo Daniel	39.15
4 × 400 metres relay	Cuba (CUB); Lázaro Martínez; Leandro Peñalver; Roberto Ramos; Roberto Hernández	3:02.20	Soviet Union (URS); Tagir Zemskov; Sergey Kutsebo; Yevgeniy Lomtyev; Vladimir Prosin	3:02.66	United States (USA); Clarence Daniel; LeRoy Dixson; Dale Laverty; Cedric Vaughans	3:02.68
20 kilometres walk	Viktor Mostovik (URS)	1:25:52	Andrey Perlov (URS)	1:25:52	Guillaume LeBlanc (CAN)	1:26:22
High jump	Igor Paklin (URS)	2.41	Francisco Centelles (CUB)	2.31	Gerd Nagel (FRG)	2.26
Pole vault	Radion Gataullin (URS)	5.75	Philippe Collet (FRA)	5.70	David Volz (USA)	5.60
Long jump	Jaime Jefferson (CUB)	8.07	Robert Emmiyan (URS)	8.03	Stanisław Jaskułka (POL)	7.99
Triple jump	Charles Simpkins (USA)	17.86	Alexander Yakovlev (URS)	17.43	John Herbert (GBR)	17.41
Shot put	Remigius Machura (TCH)	21.13	Alessandro Andrei (ITA)	20.85	Ventsislav Khristov (BUL)	19.90
Discus throw	Luis Delís (CUB)	66.84	Vaclavas Kidykas (URS)	63.12	Juan Martínez Brito (CUB)	63.02
Hammer throw	Heinz Weis (FRG)	76.00	Lucio Serrani (ITA)	74.08	Igor Nikulin (URS)	74.04
Javelin throw	Dumitru Negoiţă (ROM)	84.62	Wolfram Gambke (FRG)	84.46	Jean-Paul Lakafia (FRA)	82.96
Decathlon	Mike Ramos (USA)	8071	Valter Külvet (URS)	7971	Michael Neugebauer (FRG)	7895

=== Women's events ===
Event	Gold		Silver		Bronze	
100 metres	Irina Slyusar (URS)	11.22	Anelia Nuneva (BUL)	11.29	Grace Jackson (JAM)	11.35
200 metres (wind: -2.3 m/s)	Grace Jackson (JAM)	22.59	Elżbieta Tomczak (POL)	22.76	Irina Slyusar (URS)	22.86
400 metres	Tatyana Alekseyeva (URS)	51.49	Ana Fidelia Quirot (CUB)	52.10	Sadia Showunmi (NGR)	52.78
800 metres	Nadezhda Zvyagintseva (URS)	1:58.59	Cristieana Cojocaru (ROM)	1:59.09	Ana Fidelia Quirot (CUB)	1:59.77
1500 metres	Svetlana Kitova (URS)	4:07.12	Margareta Keszeg (ROM)	4.07.55	Darlene Beckford (USA)	4:08.84
3000 metres	Cathy Branta (USA)	9:02.75	Kathy Hayes (USA)	9:02.92	Angela Chalmers (CAN)	9:03.19
10,000 metres	Marina Rodchenkova (URS)	32:58.45	Svetlana Guskova (URS)	32:59.24	Kirsten O'Hara (USA)	33:05.84
Marathon	Mami Fukao (JPN)	2:44:55	Patti Gray (USA)	2:46:20	Sylvie Bornet (FRA)	2:48:11
100 metres hurdles (wind: +0.4 m/s)	Ginka Zagorcheva (BUL)	12.71	Nadezhda Korshunova (URS)	12.87	Anne Piquereau (FRA)	12.96
400 metres hurdles	Margarita Navickaitė (URS)	55.33	Cristieana Cojocaru (ROM)	55.44	Nawal El Moutawakel (MAR)	55.59
4 × 100 metres relay	United States (USA); Kathrene Wallace; Michelle Finn; Brenda Cliette; Gwen Torrence	43.29	Soviet Union (URS); Nadezhda Korshunova; Marina Molokova; Irina Slyusar; Yelena Vinogradova	43.43	Bulgaria (BUL); Silvia Khristova; Anelia Nuneva; Pepa Pavlova; Ginka Zagorcheva	43.57
4 × 400 metres relay	Soviet Union (URS); Margarita Navickaitė; Nadezhda Zvyagintseva; Yelena Korban; Tatyana Alekseyeva	3:25.96	Canada (CAN); Charmaine Crooks; Esmie Lawrence; Camille Cato; Molly Killingbeck	3:29.06	United States (USA); Susan Shurr; Sharon Dabney; Tanya McIntosh; Joetta Clark	3:30.41
5000 metres walk	Aleksandra Grigoryeva (URS)	22:21.10	Yan Hong (CHN)	22:25.77	Natalya Serbinenko (URS)	22:27.21
High jump	Silvia Costa (CUB)	2.01	Lyudmila Petrus (URS)	1.93	Danuta Bułkowska (POL)	1.91
Long jump	Irina Valyukevich (URS)	7.04	Silvia Khristova (BUL)	6.62	Marieta Ilcu (ROM)	6.61
Shot put	Natalya Lisovskaya (URS)	20.47	Yang Yanqin (CHN)	17.79	Ramona Pagel (USA)	17.46
Discus throw	Maritza Martén (CUB)	66.66	Tsvetanka Khristova (BUL)	65.30	Daniela Costian (ROM)	63.20
Javelin throw	Ivonne Leal (CUB)	71.82	Beate Peters (FRG)	63.70	María Caridad Colón (CUB)	62.46
Heptathlon	Małgorzata Guzowska (POL)	6616	Liliana Năstase (ROM)	6313	Judy Simpson (GBR)	6045

== Medal table ==
Rank	Nation	Gold	Silver	Bronze	Total
1	Soviet Union (URS)	14	11	3	28
2	Cuba (CUB)	7	4	3	14
3	United States (USA)	6	3	11	20
4	Italy (ITA)	3	3	0	6
5	Bulgaria (BUL)	2	3	2	7
6	Nigeria (NGR)	2	1	2	5
6	Poland (POL)	2	1	2	5
8	Romania (ROM)	1	4	2	7
9	West Germany (FRG)	1	2	2	5
10	Great Britain (GBR)	1	1	2	4
11	Jamaica (JAM)	1	0	1	2
11	Japan (JPN)*	1	0	1	2
13	Czechoslovakia (TCH)	1	0	0	1
14	Canada (CAN)	0	4	3	7
15	China (CHN)	0	2	0	2
16	France (FRA)	0	1	3	4
17	Hungary (HUN)	0	1	0	1
17	Mexico (MEX)	0	1	0	1
19	Ivory Coast (CIV)	0	0	1	1
19	Morocco (MAR)	0	0	1	1
19	Netherlands (NED)	0	0	1	1
19	South Korea (KOR)	0	0	1	1
19	Yugoslavia (YUG)	0	0	1	1
Totals (23 entries)		42	42	42	126

== See also ==
- 1985 in the sport of athletics
- FISU World University Games
- University and college sport
