= Lázaro Martínez (sprinter) =

Cuban sprinter (born 1962)

Personal information
- Full name: Lázaro Martínez Despaigne
- Born: November 11, 1962 (age 63) La Lisa, Havana, Cuba
Medal record
Men's athletics
Representing Cuba
Olympic Games
Silver medal – second place	1992 Barcelona	4x400 m relay
World Championships
Bronze medal – third place	1987 Rome	4x400 m relay
Pan American Games
Gold medal – first place	1991 Havana	4x400 m relay
Silver medal – second place	1987 Indianapolis	4x400 m relay
Silver medal – second place	1983 Caracas	400 m
Bronze medal – third place	1987 Caracas	4x400 m relay
Central American and Caribbean Games
Gold medal – first place	1990 Mexico City	4x400 m relay
Bronze medal – third place	1993 Ponce	4x400 m relay
Summer Universiade
Gold medal – first place	1985 Kobe	4x400 m relay

Lázaro Martínez Despaigne (born November 11, 1962) is a retired Cuban sprinter who specialized in the 400 metres. He was born in La Lisa, Havana.

Martínez won an Olympic silver medal in 4 x 400 metres relay in Barcelona 1992. His personal best of 46.12 was set during the 1991 World Championships.

He has a daughter, Nathalie, with retired Cuban high jumper Silvia Costa. Nathalie Martínez is an able hurdler. His son is Abel Martinez Abreu who was born in Spain, with Ana E. Abreu Garcia.
