= Athletics at the 1982 Commonwealth Games – Men's 400 metres =

Men's 400 metres at the Commonwealth Games

The men's 400 metres event at the 1982 Commonwealth Games was held on 3 and 4 October at the QE II Stadium in Brisbane, Australia.

== Medalists ==
Gold	Silver	Bronze
Bert Cameron; Jamaica	Rick Mitchell; Australia	Gary Minihan; Australia

== Results ==
=== Heats ===
Qualification: First 6 in each heat (Q) and the next 6 fastest (q) qualify for the quarterfinals.

Rank	Heat	Name	Nationality	Time	Notes
1	2	John Anzrah	Kenya	46.80	Q
2	1	Michael Okot	Uganda	46.86	Q
3	5	Davison Lishebo	Zambia	47.44	Q
4	2	John Okoye	Nigeria	47.47	Q
5	1	Tim Bethune	Canada	47.73	Q
6	1	Rick Mitchell	Australia	47.93	Q
7	4	Elisha Bitok	Kenya	47.96	Q
8	2	Bert Cameron	Jamaica	47.98	Q
9	2	Gary Minihan	Australia	48.25	Q
10	5	James Atuti	Kenya	48.26	Q
11	3	Abu Alhassan	Ghana	48.27	Q
12	1	Nikolaos Megalemos	Cyprus	48.34	Q
13	3	Greg Parker	Australia	48.35	Q
14	1	Edward Pappoe	Ghana	48.37	Q
15	3	Phil Brown	England	48.49	Q
16	5	Todd Bennett	England	48.56	Q
17	1	Glen Taute	Zimbabwe	48.63	Q
18	5	Gordon Hinds	Barbados	48.67	Q
19	2	Gerry Hinds	Canada	48.74	Q
20	3	Agripa Mwausegha	Malawi	48.77	Q
21	5	Awudu Nuhu	Ghana	48.92	Q
22	1	David Carter	Barbados	49.05	q
23	3	Njere Shumba	Zimbabwe	49.08	Q
24	2	Lapule Tamean	Papua New Guinea	49.18	Q
25	4	Doug Hinds	Canada	49.20	Q
26	4	Steven Scutt	England	49.32	Q
27	4	Richard Louis	Barbados	49.54	Q
28	5	Joseph Rodan	Fiji	49.71	Q
29	4	Glen de Souza	Zimbabwe	49.85	Q
30	5	Pius Kgannyeng	Botswana	49.86	q
31	4	Paiwa Bogela	Papua New Guinea	49.89	Q
32	3	Charles Lupiya	Zambia	49.93	Q
33	2	John Chappory	Gibraltar	50.07	q
34	4	Dick Kunda	Zambia	50.26	q
35	2	Lau Chi Keung	Hong Kong	50.42	q
36	1	Aaron Hitu	Solomon Islands	50.78	q
37	3	Rolagi Faa Mausili	Western Samoa	52.10	
	3	Peter Rwamuhanda	Uganda	DNS	
	4	Joseph Ramotshabi	Botswana	DNS	

=== Quarterfinals ===
Qualification: First 4 in each heat (Q) and the next 2 fastest (q) qualify for the semifinals.

Rank	Heat	Name	Nationality	Time	Notes
1	3	Michael Okot	Uganda	46.54	Q
2	4	Rick Mitchell	Australia	46.70	Q
3	1	Bert Cameron	Jamaica	46.81	Q
4	2	Todd Bennett	England	46.91	Q
5	2	James Atuti	Kenya	46.97	Q
6	2	Tim Bethune	Canada	47.04	Q
7	4	John Anzrah	Kenya	47.06	Q
8	1	Doug Hinds	Canada	47.10	Q
9	1	Greg Parker	Australia	47.15	Q
10	2	Davison Lishebo	Zambia	47.24	Q
11	3	Gary Minihan	Australia	47.25	Q
12	3	Phil Brown	England	47.26	Q
13	4	Abu Alhassan	Ghana	47.49	Q
14	1	Steven Scutt	England	47.61	Q
15	4	Richard Louis	Barbados	47.81	Q
16	3	Nikolaos Megalemos	Cyprus	47.82	Q
17	2	John Okoye	Nigeria	47.83	q
18	3	Elisha Bitok	Kenya	48.05	q
19	4	Gerry Hinds	Canada	48.31	
20	4	Njere Shumba	Zimbabwe	48.37	
21	2	Gordon Hinds	Barbados	48.48	
22	4	Lapule Tamean	Papua New Guinea	48.52	
23	4	Agripa Mwausegha	Malawi	48.58	
24	3	Edward Pappoe	Ghana	48.66	
25	2	Awudu Nuhu	Ghana	48.72	
26	1	David Carter	Barbados	48.89	
27	1	Glen de Souza	Zimbabwe	48.98	
28	1	Charles Lupiya	Zambia	48.98	
29	2	Glen Taute	Zimbabwe	49.22	
30	1	Pius Kgannyeng	Botswana	49.27	
31	3	Joseph Rodan	Fiji	49.73	
32	2	Paiwa Bogela	Papua New Guinea	49.74	
33	1	John Chappory	Gibraltar	49.82	
34	3	Lau Chi Keung	Hong Kong	50.06	
35	4	Aaron Hitu	Solomon Islands	50.30	
36	3	Dick Kunda	Zambia	50.38	

=== Semifinals ===
Qualification: First 4 in each semifinal (Q) and the next 1 fastest (q) qualify for the final.

Rank	Heat	Name	Nationality	Time	Notes
1	1	Bert Cameron	Jamaica	45.78	Q
2	1	Todd Bennett	England	45.89	Q
3	1	Michael Okot	Uganda	46.12	Q
4	1	Greg Parker	Australia	46.22	Q
5	2	Phil Brown	England	46.45	Q
6	1	Tim Bethune	Canada	46.50	q
7	2	Gary Minihan	Australia	46.60	Q
8	2	Rick Mitchell	Australia	46.64	Q
9	2	James Atuti	Kenya	46.68	Q
10	1	Elisha Bitok	Kenya	46.74	
11	2	John Anzrah	Kenya	46.82	
12	1	Steven Scutt	England	46.91	
13	2	Davison Lishebo	Zambia	47.11	
14	2	Doug Hinds	Canada	47.30	
15	1	Nikolaos Megalemos	Cyprus	47.47	
16	1	Abu Alhassan	Ghana	47.82	
17	2	John Okoye	Nigeria	47.85	
18	2	Richard Louis	Barbados	48.49	

=== Final ===
Rank	Lane	Name	Nationality	Time	Notes
1st place, gold medalist(s)	3	Bert Cameron	Jamaica	45.89	
2nd place, silver medalist(s)	6	Rick Mitchell	Australia	46.61	
3rd place, bronze medalist(s)	2	Gary Minihan	Australia	46.68	
4	5	Michael Okot	Uganda	46.81	
5	9	Todd Bennett	England	47.06	
6	7	Phil Brown	England	47.11	
7	4	Tim Bethune	Canada	47.34	
8	1	Greg Parker	Australia	47.57	
9	8	James Atuti	Kenya	48.01	
