= Athletics at the 1982 Commonwealth Games – Men's 4 × 400 metres relay =

Men's 4 × 400 metres relay at the Commonwealth Games

The men's 4 × 400 metres relay event at the 1982 Commonwealth Games was held on 9 October at the QE II Stadium in Brisbane, Australia.

== Results ==
Rank	Nation	Athletes	Time	Notes
1st place, gold medalist(s)	England	Steven Scutt, Garry Cook, Todd Bennett, Phil Brown	3:05.45	
2nd place, silver medalist(s)	Australia	Gary Minihan, John Fleming, Greg Parker, Rick Mitchell	3:05.82	
3rd place, bronze medalist(s)	Kenya	Elisha Bitok, Juma Ndiwa, John Anzrah, James Maina Boi	3:06.33	
4	Canada	Doug Hinds, Ian Newhouse, Lloyd Guss, Tim Bethune	3:07.04	
5	Barbados	Hamil Grimes, David Carter, Gordon Hinds, Richard Louis	3:12.44	
6	Zambia	Charles Lupiya, Lyamba Nyambe, Dick Kunda, Dave Lishebo	3:13.85	
7	Ghana	John Barnor Akuttey, William Hammond, Awudu Nuhu, Edward Pappoe	3:14.31	
8	Zimbabwe	Glen Taute, Mark Fanucci, Glen de Souza, Njere Shumba	3:15.18	
9	Botswana	Pius Kgannyeng, Temba Mpofu, Shepherd Mogapi, Joseph Ramotshabi	3:18.70	
