= 1983 World Championships in Athletics – Men's 4 × 400 metres relay =

Athletics event

The 4 × 400 metres relay at the 1983 World Championships in Athletics was held at the Helsinki Olympic Stadium on August 13 and August 14.

== Medals ==
Gold:	Silver:	Bronze:
Soviet Union; Sergey Lovachov; Aleksandr Troshchilo; Nikolay Chernetskiy; Viktor Markin	West Germany; Erwin Skamrahl; Jörg Vaihinger; Harald Schmid; Hartmut Weber	Great Britain; Ainsley Bennett; Garry Cook; Todd Bennett; Philip Brown

== Records ==
Existing records at the start of the event.

World Record	United States (USA)	2:56.16	Mexico City, Mexico	October 20, 1968
Championship Record	New event			

== Results ==
=== Heats ===
All times shown are in minutes.

AR area record | CR championship record | GR games record | NR national record | OR Olympic record | PB personal best | SB season best | WL world leading (in a given season)
DNS = did not start | DQ = disqualification | NM = no mark (i.e. no valid result) | Q = qualification by place in heat | q = qualification by overall place

==== Heat 1 ====
1. United States (Alonzo Babers, Willie Smith, Andre Phillips, Michael Franks) 3:06.62 Q
2. West Germany (Martin Weppler, Jörg Vaihinger, Harald Schmid, Hartmut Weber) 3:07.50 Q
3. Italy (Stefano Malinverni, Donato Sabia, Mauro Zuliani, Roberto Ribaud) 3:07.90 Q
4. Brazil (Antônio Dias Ferreira, Agberto Guimarães, José Luíz Barbosa, Gerson A. Souza) 3:08.25 Q
5. Sweden (Tommy Johansson, Eric Josjö, Sven Nylander, Per-Erik Olsson) 3:08.33 q
6. Canada (Mark Guthrie, Douglas Hinds, Tim Bethune, Brian Saunders) 3:08.37 q
7. Jamaica (Steve Griffiths, George Walcott, Devon Morris, Karl Smith) 3:09.06
8. Finland (Jari Niemelä, Mauri Siekkinen, Matti Rusanen, Hannu Mykrä) 3:09.23

==== Heat 2 ====
1. Hungary (Gusztáv Menczer, Sándor Újhelyi, István Takács, Sándor Vasvári) 3:09.95 Q
2. Soviet Union (Viktor Markin, Sergey Lovachov, Aleksandr Troshchilo, Nikolay Chernetskiy) 3:10.16 Q
3. Great Britain (Kriss Akabusi, Garry Cook, Todd Bennett, Philip Brown) 3:10.19 Q
4. Senegal (Amadou Dia Ba, Moussa Fall, Babacar Niang, Boubacar Diallo) 3:10.90 Q
5. Australia (Bruce Frayne, Gary Minihan, Paul Gilbert, Darren Clark) 3:11.62
  - Ghana DNS
  - Bahamas DNS

==== Heat 3 ====
1. France (Jacques Fellice, Yann Quentrec, Hector Llatser, Aldo Canti) 3:06.99 Q
2. Czechoslovakia (Miroslav Zahořák, Petr Břečka, Dušan Malovec, Ján Tomko) 3:07.03 Q
3. Poland (Ryszard Wichrowski, Ryszard Szparak, Andrzej Stępień, Ryszard Podlas) 3:07.18 Q
4. Japan (Kazunori Asaba, Tomoharu Isobe, Hirofumi Koike, Susumu Takano) 3:07.23 Q
5. Spain (Juan José Prado, Antonio Sánchez, Carlos Azulay, Angel Heras) 3:07.42 q
6. Kenya (Elijah Bitok, John Anzrah, James Atuti, Juma Ndiwa) 3:07.48 q
7. Ivory Coast (Georges Kablan Degnan, Rene Djedjemel Meledje, Avognan Nogboum, Gabriel Tiacoh) 3:09.23
  - Uganda (John Goville, Mike Okot, Charles Mbazira, Moses Kyeswa) DQ

=== Semi-finals ===
==== Heat 1 ====
1. United States (Alonzo Babers, Sunder Nix, Willie Smith, Edwin Moses) 3:02.13 Q
2. West Germany (Erwin Skamrahl, Jörg Vaihinger, Edgar Nakladal, Harald Schmid) 3:04.96 Q
3. Poland (Ryszard Wichrowski, Ryszard Szparak, Andrzej Stępień, Ryszard Podlas) 3:05.51 Q
4. Italy (Stefano Malinverni, Donato Sabia, Mauro Zuliani, Roberto Ribaud) 3:05.70 Q
5. Canada (Brian Saunders, Douglas Hinds, Ian Newhouse, Tim Bethune) 3:06.42
6. Japan (Tomoharu Isobe, Kazunori Asaba, Hirofumi Koike, Susumu Takano) 3:07.11
7. Senegal (Moussa Fall, Babacar Niang, Mathurin Barry, Amadou Dia Ba) 3:09.63
8. Hungary (Gusztáv Menczer, Sándor Újhelyi, István Takács, Sándor Vasvári) 3:11.08

==== Heat 2 ====
1. Soviet Union (Sergey Lovachov, Aleksandr Troshchilo, Nikolay Chernetskiy, Viktor Markin) 3:03.75 Q
2. Great Britain (Kriss Akabusi, Garry Cook, Todd Bennett, Philip Brown) 3:04.03 Q
3. Czechoslovakia (Miroslav Zahořák, Petr Břečka, Dušan Malovec, Ján Tomko) 3:04.32 Q
4. Sweden (Tommy Johansson, Eric Josjö, Sven Nylander, Per-Erik Olsson) 3:04.32 Q
5. Brazil (Antônio Dias Ferreira, Agberto Guimarães, José Luíz Barbosa, Gerson A. Souza) 3:04.46 (AR)
6. France (Jacques Fellice, Yann Quentrec, Hector Llatser, Aldo Canti) 3:05.09
7. Kenya (David Kitur, John Anzrah, James Atuti, James Maina Boi) 3:05.30
8. Spain (Juan José Prado, Antonio Sánchez, Carlos Azulay, Angel Heras) 3:09.68

=== Final ===
1. Soviet Union (Sergey Lovachov, Aleksandr Troshchilo, Nikolay Chernetskiy, Viktor Markin) 3:00.79
2. West Germany (Erwin Skamrahl, Jörg Vaihinger, Harald Schmid, Hartmut Weber) 3:01.83
3. Great Britain (Ainsley Bennett, Garry Cook, Todd Bennett, Philip Brown) 3:03.53
4. Czechoslovakia (Miroslav Zahořák, Petr Břečka, Dušan Malovec, Ján Tomko) 3:03.90
5. Italy (Stefano Malinverni, Donato Sabia, Mauro Zuliani, Roberto Ribaud) 3:05.10
6. United States (Alonzo Babers, Sunder Nix, Willie Smith, Edwin Moses) 3:05.29
7. Sweden (Tommy Johansson, Eric Josjö, Per-Erik Olsson, Ulf Sedlacek) 3:08.57
  - Poland (Ryszard Wichrowski, Ryszard Szparak, Andrzej Stępień, Ryszard Podlas) DNF
