= Great Britain and Northern Ireland at the 1983 World Championships in Athletics =

Great Britain and Northern Ireland at the 1983 World Athletics Championships
- Flag of Great Britain
- WA code: GBR

in Helsinki, Finland 7 August 1983 – 14 August 1983
- Competitors: 66 (39 men and 27 women)
- Medals Ranked 6th: Gold 2 Silver 2 Bronze 3 Total 7

World Athletics Championships appearances (overview)
- 1976; 1980; 1983; 1987; 1991; 1993; 1995; 1997; 1999; 2001; 2003; 2005; 2007; 2009; 2011; 2013; 2015; 2017; 2019; 2022; 2023; 2025

Great Britain and Northern Ireland competed at the 1983 World Athletics Championships in Helsinki, Finland, from 7 to 14 August 1983.

== Medallists ==
Medal	Name	Event	Date
Gold	Daley Thompson	Men's decathlon	13 August
Gold	Steve Cram	Men's 1500 metres	14 August
Silver	Joan Baptiste; Beverley Callender; Kathy Cook; Shirley Thomas	Women's 4 × 100 metres relay	10 August
Silver	Fatima Whitbread	Women's javelin throw	13 August
Bronze	Colin Reitz	Men's 3000 metres steeplechase	12 August
Bronze	Kathy Cook	Women's 200 metres	14 August
Bronze	Kriss Akabusi*; Ainsley Bennett; Todd Bennett; Phil Brown; Garry Cook	Men's 4 × 400 metres relay	14 August

== Results ==
Great Britain and Northern Ireland entered 66 athletes to the championships: 27 women and 39 men.

Key

- Q = Qualified for the next round
- q = Qualified for the next round as a fastest loser or, in field events, by position without achieving the qualifying target
- NR = National record
- PB = Personal best
- SB = Season best
- N/A = Round not applicable for the event

=== Men ===
Track and road events

Athlete	Event	Heat		Quarter Final		Semifinal		Final	
Athlete	Event	Result	Rank	Result	Rank	Result	Rank	Result	Rank
Cameron Sharp	100 metres	10.44	2 Q	10.41	3 Q	10.43	6	Did not advance	
Luke Watson	100 metres	10.64	1 Q	10.57	7	Did not advance			
Allan Wells	100 metres	10.37	1 Q	10.37	2 Q	10.35	2 Q	10.27	4
Cameron Sharp	200 metres	21.07	2 Q	20.99	4 Q	20.69	5	Did not advance	
Luke Watson	200 metres	21.20	2 Q	20.99	5	Did not advance			
Allan Wells	200 metres	21.14	1 Q	20.81	3 Q	20.63	4 Q	20.52	4
Todd Bennett	400 metres	46.58	2 Q	46.39	4 Q	46.11	6	Did not advance	
Phil Brown	400 metres	46.60	3 Q	46.39	4 Q	46.81	8	Did not advance	
Garry Cook	800 metres	1:46.44	2 Q	—N/a		1:47.46	6	Did not advance	
Peter Elliott	800 metres	1:46.53	3 Q	—N/a		1:45.28	3 q	1:44.87	4
Steve Cram	1500 metres	3:40.17	1 Q	—N/a		3:35.77	1 Q	3:41.59	1st place, gold medalist(s)
Steve Ovett	1500 metres	3:39.00	2 Q	—N/a		3:36.26	2 Q	3:42.34	4
Graham Williamson	1500 metres	3:38.99	4 Q	—N/a		3:48.84	10	Did not advance	
Dave Clarke	5000 metres	14:13.97	5 Q	—N/a		13:58.37	11	Did not advance	
Julian Goater	5000 metres	14:23.63	3 Q	—N/a		13:36.21	7 q	13:48.13	14
Eamonn Martin	5000 metres	13:43.57	3 Q	—N/a		13:48.60	11	Did not advance	
Steve Binns	10,000 metres	28:12.79	10	—N/a				Did not advance	
Steve Jones	10,000 metres	27:47.57	6 q	—N/a				28:15.03	12
Nick Rose	10,000 metres	28:06.05	3 Q	—N/a				28:07.53	7
Mike Gratton	Marathon	—N/a						DNF	—N/a
Gerry Helme	Marathon	—N/a						2:25.02	48
Hugh Jones	Marathon	—N/a						2:11.15	8
Mark Holtom	110 metres hurdles	13.85	4 q	—N/a		13.79	6	Did not advance	
Gary Oakes	400 metres hurdles	51.23	3	—N/a		Did not advance			
Steve Sole	400 metres hurdles	51.80	6	—N/a		Did not advance			
Graeme Fell	3000 metres steeplechase	8:27.71	4 Q	—N/a		8:23.22	7 q	8:20.01	6
Roger Hackney	3000 metres steeplechase	8:30.90	5 Q	—N/a		8:22.44	6 q	8:19.38	5
Colin Reitz	3000 metres steeplechase	8:22.78	1 Q	—N/a		8:22.91	1 Q	8:17.75	3rd place, bronze medalist(s)
Ainsley Bennett; Mike McFarlane; Drew McMaster; Donovan Reid	4 × 100 metres relay	39.56	3 Q	—N/a		39.39	5	Did not advance	
Kriss Akabusi*; Ainsley Bennett; Todd Bennett; Phil Brown; Garry Cook	4 × 400 metres relay	3:10.19	3 Q	—N/a		3.04.03	2 Q	3.03.53	3rd place, bronze medalist(s)
Roger Mills	20 kilometres walk	—N/a						1:30.25	37
Ian McCombie	20 kilometres walk	—N/a						1:31.14	41
Phil Vesty	20 kilometres walk	—N/a						1:27.20	25

* – Indicates the athlete competed in preliminaries but not the final

Field events

Athlete	Event	Qualification		Final	
Athlete	Event	Distance	Position	Distance	Position
Keith Connor	Triple jump	16.18	7	Did not advance	
John Herbert	Triple jump	16.12	10	Did not advance	
Chris Black	Hammer throw	71.18	7	Did not advance	
Matthew Mileham	Hammer throw	67.12	12	Did not advance	
Robert Weir	Hammer throw	71.62	9	Did not advance	

Combined events – Decathlon

Athlete	Event	100m	LJ	SP	HJ	400m	110m H	DT	PV	JT	1500 m	Final	Rank
Daley Thompson	Result	10.60	7.88	15.35	2.03	48.12	14.37	44.46	5.10	65.24	4:29.7	8666	1st place, gold medalist(s)
Daley Thompson	Points											8666	1st place, gold medalist(s)

=== Women ===
Track and road events

Athlete	Event	Heat		Quarter Final		Semifinal		Final	
Athlete	Event	Result	Rank	Result	Rank	Result	Rank	Result	Rank
Beverley Callender	100 metres	11.65	3 Q	11.48	5	Did not advance			
Heather Oakes	100 metres	11.60	3 Q	11.57	4 Q	11.50	7	Did not advance	
Shirley Thomas	100 metres	11.54	2 Q	11.48	4 Q	11.53	8	Did not advance	
Joan Baptiste	200 metres	23.24	1 Q	23.29	2 Q	23.24	5	Did not advance	
Kathy Cook	200 metres	23.20	1 Q	22.78	1 Q	22.57	2 Q	22.37	3rd place, bronze medalist(s)
Sandra Whittaker	200 metres	23.63	5 q	23.58	5	Did not advance			
Michelle Scutt	400 metres	53.30	4 Q	52.70	4 Q	51.88	6	Did not advance	
Christina Boxer	1500 metres	4:09.88	4 q	—N/a				4:06.74	9
Wendy Sly	1500 metres	4:08.16	3 Q	—N/a				4:04.14	5
Christine Benning	3000 metres	8:49.71	5 Q	—N/a				8:58.01	13
Jane Furniss	3000 metres	8:48.59	4 Q	—N/a				8:45.69	7
Wendy Sly	3000 metres	8:47.39	4 Q	—N/a				8:37.06	5
Kathryn Binns	Marathon	—N/a						2:42.12	22
Glynis Penny	Marathon	—N/a						DNS	—N/a
Joyce Smith	Marathon	—N/a						2:34.27	9
Lorna Boothe	100 metres hurdles	13.46	5 Q	13.29	5	Did not advance			
Judy Livermore	100 metres hurdles	13.25	4 Q	13.22	2 Q	13.30	7	Did not advance	
Shirley Strong	100 metres hurdles	13.26	1 Q	12.91	1 Q	12.99	4 Q	12.78	5
Verona Elder	400 metres hurdles	58.71	6	—N/a		Did not advance			
Susan Morley	400 metres hurdles	56.58	2 Q	—N/a		56.09	4 Q	56.07	7
Gladys Taylor	400 metres hurdles	58.25	5	—N/a		Did not advance			
Joan Baptiste; Beverley Callender; Kathy Cook; Shirley Thomas	4 × 100 metres relay	43.06	1 Q	—N/a				42.71	2nd place, silver medalist(s)

* – Indicates the athlete competed in preliminaries but not the final

Field events

Athlete	Event	Qualification		Final	
Athlete	Event	Distance	Position	Distance	Position
Gillian Evans	High jump	1.84	10	Did not advance	
Beverly Kinch	Long jump	6.43	6 Q	6.93	5
Venissa Head	Shot put	18.41	9 Q	18.05	10
Judy Oakes	Shot put	17.61	12 Q	17.52	12
Meg Ritchie	Shot put	16.14	16	Did not advance	
Venissa Head	Discus throw	53.78	17	Did not advance	
Meg Ritchie	Discus throw	59.28	11 q	62.50	8
Tessa Sanderson	Javelin throw	64.80	3 Q	64.76	4
Fatima Whitbread	Javelin throw	60.96	12 q	69.14	2nd place, silver medalist(s)

Combined events – Heptathlon

Athlete	Event	100H	HJ	SP	200 m	LJ	JT	800 m	Final	Rank
Judy Livermore	Result	13.23	1.92	13.85	24.93	6.16	NM	DNS	DNF	—N/a
Judy Livermore	Points								DNF	—N/a

* – Indicates the athlete competed in preliminaries but not the final
