= 1983 World Championships in Athletics – Men's 400 metres =

Men's 400 metres at the 1983 World Championships
- Venue: Helsinki Olympic Stadium
- Dates: 7 August (heats); 8 August (quarter-finals); 9 August (semi-finals); 10 August (final)
- Competitors: 55
- Winning time: 45.05 CR

Medalists
gold medal	Bert Cameron	Jamaica
silver medal	Michael Franks	United States
bronze medal	Sunder Nix	United States

These are the official results of the men's 400 metres event at the 1983 IAAF World Championships in Helsinki, Finland. There were a total number of 55 participating athletes, with seven qualifying heats and the final held on 10 August 1983. The winning margin was 0.17 seconds.

== Records ==
Existing records at the start of the event.

World Record	Lee Evans (USA)	43.86	Mexico City, Mexico	October 18, 1968
Championship Record	New event			

== Results ==
=== Qualifying heats ===
The qualifying heats took place on 7 August, with the 55 athletes involved being split into 7 heats. The first 3 athletes in each heat ( Q ) and the next 11 fastest ( q ) qualified for the quarter-finals.

Heat 1

Rank	Name	Nationality	Time	Notes
1	Sunder Nix	United States	46.19	Q, CR
2	Gerson A. Souza	Brazil	46.43	Q
3	Philip Brown	Great Britain & N.I.	46.60	Q
4	Isidro del Prado	Philippines	46.92	q
5	Aldo Canti	France	47.50	
6	Gordan Hinds	Barbados	47.55	
7	Kenrick Camerud	Saint Kitts and Nevis	49.68	
	Paiwa Bogela	Papua New Guinea		DNS

Heat 2

Rank	Name	Nationality	Time	Notes
1	Bert Cameron	Jamaica	46.11	Q, CR
2	Ján Tomko	Czechoslovakia	46.17	Q
3	Thomas Schönlebe	East Germany	46.23	Q
4	Sándor Vasvári	Hungary	46.69	q
5	Abu Alhassan	Ghana	48.14	
6	Salem Khalil Ibrahim	United Arab Emirates	48.16	
7	Ali Al Harazi	Yemen	59.67	
	Ángel Heras	Spain		DQ

Heat 3

Rank	Name	Nationality	Time	Notes
1	Erwin Skamrahl	West Germany	46.31	Q
2	Todd Bennett	Great Britain & N.I.	46.58	Q
3	Douglas Hinds	Canada	46.64	Q
4	Gary Minihan	Australia	46.90	q
5	James Atuti	Kenya	46.95	q
6	Dean Greenaway	British Virgin Islands	48.26	
	Emmanuel Bitanga	Cameroon		DNS

Heat 4

Rank	Name	Nationality	Time	Notes
1	Michael Paul	Trinidad and Tobago	46.33	Q
2	Moses Kyeswa	Uganda	46.35	Q
3	Susumu Takano	Japan	46.66	Q
4	Eliot Tabron	United States	46.68	q
5	Marcel Arnold	Switzerland	47.44	q
6	David Sawyerr	Sierra Leone	49.29	
7	Lenford O'Garro	Saint Vincent and the Grenadines	50.25	
	Nafi Ahmed Mersal	Egypt		DNF

Heat 5

Rank	Name	Nationality	Time	Notes
1	Martin Weppler	West Germany	46.32	Q
2	Hassan El Kachief	Sudan	46.61	Q
3	Viktor Markin	Soviet Union	46.74	Q
4	Gabriel Tiacoh	Ivory Coast	47.11	q
5	Hector Daley	Panama	47.19	q
6	Eric Josjö	Sweden	47.25	q
7	Jean-Marie Rudasinqwa	Rwanda	50.52	
	Allan Ingraham	Bahamas		DNS

Heat 6

Rank	Name	Nationality	Time	Notes
1	Michael Franks	United States	46.16	Q
2	Oddur Sigurdsson	Iceland	47.09	Q
3	Christopher Madzokere	Zimbabwe	47.17	Q
4	Dušan Malovec	Czechoslovakia	47.35	q
5	Moussa Fall	Senegal	47.72	
6	Joseph Ramotshabi	Botswana	48.35	
7	Agripa Mwausegha	Malawi	49.02	
	Sunday Uti	Nigeria		DQ

Heat 7

Rank	Name	Nationality	Time	Notes
1	Hartmut Weber	West Germany	45.74	Q, CR
2	Darren Clark	Australia	46.26	Q
3	Mike Okot	Uganda	46.69	Q
4	Matti Rusanen	Finland	47.37	q
5	Adram M'Kumi	Tanzania	49.22	
6	Clive Williams	Belize	51.82	
	Mike Solomon	Trinidad and Tobago		DNS
	Roberto Ribaud	Italy		DQ

=== Quarterfinals ===
The qualifying heats took place on 8 August, with the 32 athletes involved being split into 4 heats. The first 4 athletes in each heat ( Q ) qualified for the semifinals.

Heat 1

Rank	Name	Nationality	Time	Notes
1	Michael Franks	United States	45.57	Q, CR
2	Philip Brown	Great Britain & N.I.	45.80	Q
3	Thomas Schönlebe	East Germany	45.86	Q
4	Martin Weppler	West Germany	46.12	Q
5	Gary Minihan	Australia	46.32	
6	Mike Okot	Uganda	46.38	
7	Christopher Madzokere	Zimbabwe	46.74	
	Dušan Malovec	Czechoslovakia		DNF

Heat 2

Rank	Name	Nationality	Time	Notes
1	Bert Cameron	Jamaica	45.76	Q
2	Darren Clark	Australia	45.84	Q
3	Erwin Skamrahl	West Germany	45.90	Q
4	Gerson A. Souza	Brazil	45.94	Q
5	Gabriel Tiacoh	Ivory Coast	46.22	
6	Eliot Tabron	United States	46.54	
7	Isidro del Prado	Philippines	46.71	
8	Matti Rusanen	Finland	47.69	

Heat 3

Rank	Name	Nationality	Time	Notes
1	Hartmut Weber	West Germany	46.01	Q
2	Moses Kyeswa	Uganda	46.31	Q
3	Michael Paul	Trinidad and Tobago	46.44	Q
4	Douglas Hinds	Canada	46.62	Q
5	Susumu Takano	Japan	47.06	
6	James Atuti	Kenya	47.59	
7	Oddur Sigurdsson	Iceland	48.09	
	Marcel Arnold	Switzerland		DNS

Heat 4

Rank	Name	Nationality	Time	Notes
1	Viktor Markin	Soviet Union	46.16	Q
2	Sunder Nix	United States	46.19	Q
3	Ján Tomko	Czechoslovakia	46.24	Q
4	Todd Bennett	Great Britain & N.I.	46.39	Q
5	Hector Daley	Panama	46.42	
6	Eric Josjö	Sweden	46.97	
7	Sándor Vasvári	Hungary	47.34	
	Hassan El Kachief	Sudan		DNF

=== Semifinals ===
The semifinals took place on 9 August, with the 16 athletes involved being split into 2 heats. The first 4 athletes in each heat ( Q ) qualified for the final.

Heat 1

Rank	Name	Nationality	Time	Notes
1	Michael Franks	United States	45.44	Q, CR
2	Hartmut Weber	West Germany	45.61	Q
3	Thomas Schönlebe	East Germany	45.67	Q
4	Michael Paul	Trinidad and Tobago	45.83	Q
5	Ján Tomko	Czechoslovakia	46.03	
6	Todd Bennett	Great Britain & N.I.	46.11	
7	Darren Clark	Australia	46.36	
8	Martin Weppler	West Germany	46.55	

Heat 2

Rank	Name	Nationality	Time	Notes
1	Bert Cameron	Jamaica	45.48	Q
2	Erwin Skamrahl	West Germany	45.61	Q
3	Gerson A. Souza	Brazil	45.63	Q
4	Sunder Nix	United States	45.73	Q
5	Viktor Markin	Soviet Union	45.73	
6.	Douglas Hinds	Canada	46.52	
7.	Moses Kyeswa	Uganda	46.79	
8.	Philip Brown	Great Britain & N.I.	46.81	

=== Final ===
The final took place on August 10.

Rank	Lane	Name	Nationality	Time	Notes
1st place, gold medalist(s)	4	Bert Cameron	Jamaica	45.05	CR
2nd place, silver medalist(s)	5	Michael Franks	United States	45.22	
3rd place, bronze medalist(s)	1	Sunder Nix	United States	45.24	
4	7	Erwin Skamrahl	West Germany	45.37	
5	3	Hartmut Weber	West Germany	45.49	
6	6	Thomas Schönlebe	East Germany	45.50	
7	8	Michael Paul	Trinidad and Tobago	45.80	
8	2	Gerson A. Souza	Brazil	45.91	

== General references ==
- Results
