= Athletics at the 1982 Commonwealth Games – Men's 800 metres =

Men's 800 metres at the Commonwealth Games

The men's 800 metres event at the 1982 Commonwealth Games was held on 5 and 7 October at the QE II Stadium in Brisbane, Australia.

== Medalists ==
Gold	Silver	Bronze
Peter Bourke; Australia	James Maina Boi; Kenya	Chris McGeorge; England

== Results ==
=== Heats ===
Qualification: First 5 in each heat (Q) and the next 3 fastest (q) qualify for the semifinals.

Rank	Heat	Name	Nationality	Time	Notes
1	1	Peter Bourke	Australia	1:50.82	Q
2	1	James Maina Boi	Kenya	1:51.02	Q
3	3	Paul Forbes	Scotland	1:51.64	Q
4	3	Spyros Spyrou	Cyprus	1:51.90	Q
5	1	Philip Norgate	Wales	1:52.02	Q
6	3	Juma Ndiwa	Kenya	1:52.17	Q
7	3	Garry Cook	England	1:52.34	Q
8	1	Temba Mpofu	Botswana	1:52.38	Q
9	3	Tap Jonga	Zimbabwe	1:52.41	Q
10	1	Sean O'Neill	Northern Ireland	1:52.64	Q
11	1	Charlie Oliver	Solomon Islands	1:52.64	q
12	1	Glen Taute	Zimbabwe	1:52.74	q
13	3	Maxwell Carver	Mauritius	1:52.87	q
14	3	Richard Kermode	Fiji	1:52.91	
15	1	Gordon Hinds	Barbados	1:53.96	
16	2	Brett Crew	Australia	1:54.28	Q
17	2	Chris McGeorge	England	1:54.57	Q
18	2	Olsen Barr	Guyana	1:54.63	Q
19	2	John Walker	New Zealand	1:54.67	Q
20	2	Sammy Koskei	Kenya	1:54.85	Q
21	2	Joseph Ramotshabi	Botswana	1:55.13	
22	2	Archfel Musango	Zambia	1:55.46	
23	2	John Chappory	Gibraltar	1:55.65	
24	2	Ilimotama Daku	Fiji	1:55.70	
25	3	Yeung Sai Mo	Hong Kong	1:56.69	
26	1	Jolly Kapere	Malawi	1:58.09	
26	3	Aaron Hitu	Solomon Islands	1:58.09	

=== Semifinals ===
Qualification: First 4 in each semifinal (Q) and the next 1 fastest (q) qualify for the final.

Rank	Heat	Name	Nationality	Time	Notes
1	2	Peter Bourke	Australia	1:50.56	Q
2	2	Sammy Koskei	Kenya	1:50.71	Q
3	2	Chris McGeorge	England	1:50.72	Q
4	1	Paul Forbes	Scotland	1:50.87	Q
5	1	James Maina Boi	Kenya	1:50.88	Q
6	2	Juma Ndiwa	Kenya	1:50.91	Q
7	2	Spyros Spyrou	Cyprus	1:50.96	q
8	1	Brett Crew	Australia	1:51.16	Q
9	1	John Walker	New Zealand	1:51.68	Q
10	1	Olsen Barr	Guyana	1:52.49	
11	2	Tap Jonga	Zimbabwe	1:53.22	
12	2	Maxwell Carver	Mauritius	1:53.37	
13	2	Temba Mpofu	Botswana	1:53.80	
14	1	Charlie Oliver	Solomon Islands	1:56.50	
15	1	Sean O'Neill	Northern Ireland	1:57.16	
16	1	Glen Taute	Zimbabwe	1:58.86	
	1	Garry Cook	England	DNF	
	2	Philip Norgate	Wales	DNF	

=== Final ===
Rank	Name	Nationality	Time	Notes
1st place, gold medalist(s)	Peter Bourke	Australia	1:45.18	
2nd place, silver medalist(s)	James Maina Boi	Kenya	1:45.45	
3rd place, bronze medalist(s)	Chris McGeorge	England	1:45.60	
4	John Walker	New Zealand	1:46.23	
5	Brett Crew	Australia	1:46.82	
6	Spyros Spyrou	Cyprus	1:47.64	
7	Juma Ndiwa	Kenya	1:47.74	
8	Paul Forbes	Scotland	1:49.05	
9	Sammy Koskei	Kenya	1:52.43	
