= Steve Scutt =

English sprinter (born 1956)

Personal information
- Nationality: British (English)
- Born: 18 March 1956 (age 70) Worthing, England

Sport
- Sport: Athletics
- Event: 400m
- Club: Woodford Green AC
Medal record
Athletics
Representing England
Commonwealth Games
Gold medal – first place	1982 Brisbane	4 x 400m relay

Steven Scutt (born 18 March 1956) is an English sprinter. He won a gold medal for England in the 4x400m relay at the 1982 Commonwealth Games held in Brisbane, Australia.

== Biography ==
Scutt, a member of the Woodford Green Athletics Club, was a twice United Kingdom National champion after winning the 1979 UK Athletics Championships and the 1981 UK Athletics Championships over 400 metres.

He finished third behind Rod Milne at the 1980 AAA Championships.

He represented England and won a gold medal with Garry Cook, Phil Brown and Todd Bennett, in the 4x400m relay, at the 1982 Commonwealth Games in Brisbane, Queensland, Australia. He also competed in the 400 metres individual event where he progressed to the semi-finals.

== Personal life ==
He married fellow international athlete Michelle Scutt in 1980. In 2009, he was sentenced to 30 months in prison for fraud after misappropriating the money entrusted to him for developing and marketing an energy drink.
