= Athletics at the 1986 Commonwealth Games – Men's 400 metres =

Men's 400 metres at the Commonwealth Games

The men's 400 metres event at the 1986 Commonwealth Games was held on 26 and 27 July at the Meadowbank Stadium in Edinburgh.

== Medalists ==
| Gold | Silver | Bronze |
|---|---|---|
| Roger Black; England | Darren Clark; Australia | Phil Brown; England |

== Results ==
=== Heats ===
Qualification: First 4 of each heat (Q) and the next 4 fastest (q) qualified for the semifinals.

| Rank | Heat | Name | Nationality | Time | Notes |
|---|---|---|---|---|---|
| 1 | 2 | Darren Clark | Australia | 46.12 | Q |
| 2 | 1 | Roger Black | England | 46.66 | Q |
| 3 | 3 | Brian Whittle | Scotland | 46.69 | Q |
| 4 | 3 | Phil Brown | England | 46.78 | Q |
| 5 | 2 | Kriss Akabusi | England | 46.84 | Q |
| 6 | 1 | Bruce Frayne | Australia | 46.99 | Q |
| 7 | 3 | David Johnston | Australia | 47.13 | Q |
| 8 | 2 | Andre Smith | Canada | 47.21 | Q |
| 9 | 1 | Anton Skerritt | Canada | 47.53 | Q |
| 10 | 2 | Martin Johnston | Scotland | 48.19 | Q |
| 11 | 3 | Michael Guegan | Jersey | 48.40 | Q |
| 12 | 1 | Joseph Rodan | Fiji | 49.41 | Q |
| 13 | 3 | Reuben Kaiaha Wotu | Vanuatu | 49.44 | q |
| 14 | 2 | Odiya Silweya | Malawi | 49.45 | q |
| 15 | 3 | Zacharia Machangani | Botswana | 49.75 | q |
| 16 | 1 | Brian Nicoll | Scotland | 49.91 | q |
| 17 | 1 | John Chappory | Gibraltar | 50.65 | |
| 18 | 2 | Avelino Baldachino | Gibraltar | 51.55 | |
| | 1 | Georges Taniel | Vanuatu | DNS | |

=== Semifinals ===
Qualification: First 4 of each semifinal qualified directly (Q) for the final.

| Rank | Heat | Name | Nationality | Time | Notes |
|---|---|---|---|---|---|
| 1 | 2 | Bruce Frayne | Australia | 47.09 | Q |
| 2 | 1 | Kriss Akabusi | England | 47.15 | Q |
| 3 | 2 | David Johnston | Australia | 47.22 | Q |
| 4 | 2 | Roger Black | England | 47.27 | Q |
| 5 | 2 | Brian Whittle | Scotland | 47.56 | Q |
| 6 | 1 | Darren Clark | Australia | 47.61 | Q |
| 7 | 1 | Phil Brown | England | 47.72 | Q |
| 8 | 2 | Anton Skerritt | Canada | 47.74 | |
| 9 | 1 | Andre Smith | Canada | 47.96 | Q |
| 10 | 1 | Martin Johnston | Scotland | 48.57 | |
| 11 | 2 | Michael Guegan | Jersey | 48.80 | |
| 12 | 2 | Odiya Silweya | Malawi | 49.56 | |
| 13 | 1 | Brian Nicoll | Scotland | 50.07 | |
| 14 | 2 | Zacharia Machangani | Botswana | 50.09 | |
| 15 | 1 | Joseph Rodan | Fiji | 50.30 | |
| 16 | 1 | Reuben Kaiaha Wotu | Vanuatu | 51.08 | |

=== Final ===
| Rank | Lane | Name | Nationality | Time | Notes |
|---|---|---|---|---|---|
| 1st place, gold medalist(s) | 6 | Roger Black | England | 45.57 | |
| 2nd place, silver medalist(s) | 8 | Darren Clark | Australia | 45.98 | |
| 3rd place, bronze medalist(s) | 2 | Phil Brown | England | 46.80 | |
| 4 | 3 | Kriss Akabusi | England | 46.83 | |
| 5 | 1 | Brian Whittle | Scotland | 47.10 | |
| 6 | 4 | David Johnston | Australia | 47.24 | |
| 7 | 5 | Bruce Frayne | Australia | 47.29 | |
| 8 | 7 | Andre Smith | Canada | 47.97 | |
