= Kenya at the 1983 World Championships in Athletics =

- Flag of Kenya
- WA code: KEN

in Helsinki, Finland August 7–14, 1983
- Competitors: 21 (20 men and 1 woman) in 11 events

World Championships in Athletics appearances (overview)
- 1983; 1987; 1991; 1993; 1995; 1997; 1999; 2001; 2003; 2005; 2007; 2009; 2011; 2013; 2015; 2017; 2019; 2022; 2023

Kenya competed at the 1983 World Championships in Athletics in Helsinki, Finland, from August 7 to 14, 1983.

== Men ==
Track and road events

Athlete	Event	Heat		Quarterfinal		Semifinal		Final	
Athlete	Event	Result	Rank	Result	Rank	Result	Rank	Result	Rank
Alfred Nyambane	200 metres	21.21	18 Q	21.55	29	Did not advance			
James Atuti	400 metres	46.95	24 q	47.59	27	Did not advance			
James Maina Boi	800 metres	1:48.69	33	—		Did not advance			
Sammy Koskei	800 metres	1:49.35	38 Q	—		1:48.92	20	Did not advance	
Juma Ndiwa	800 metres	1:48.40	=28	—		Did not advance			
Mike Boit	1500 metres	3:40.06	14 q	—		3:37.45	11 q	3:46.46	12
Kipkoech Cheruiyot	1500 metres	3:43.58	31	—		Did not advance			
Paul Rugut	1500 metres	3:46.00	38	—		Did not advance			
Charles Cheruiyot	5000 metres	13:44.43	7 Q	—		13:52.61	22	Did not advance	
Paul Kipkoech	5000 metres	14:18.73	21 Q	—		13:33.33	11 Q	13:37.44	9
Meshak Munyoro	400 metres hurdles	53.25	31	—		Did not advance			
Julius Korir	3000 metres steeplechase	8:26.63	9 Q	—		8:21.07	3 Q	8:20.11	7
Kip Rono	3000 metres steeplechase	8:29.25	18 Q	—		8:33.97	20	Did not advance	
Richard Tuwei	3000 metres steeplechase	8:23.88	4 Q	—		8:33.29	=18	Did not advance	
Alfred Nyambane Johnson; Peter Wekesa; John Anzrah; Moja Shivanda	4 × 100 metres relay	DQ		—		Did not advance			
Elijah Bitok; John Anzrah; James Atuti; Juma Ndiwa; David Kitur; James Maina Boi	4 × 400 metres relay	3:07.48	7 q	—		3:05.30	9	Did not advance	

== Women ==
Track and road events

Athlete	Event	Heat		Quarterfinal		Semifinal		Final	
Athlete	Event	Result	Rank	Result	Rank	Result	Rank	Result	Rank
Rose Tata-Muya	400 metres	DNS		Did not advance					
Rose Tata-Muya	400 metres hurdles	58.09	22	—		Did not advance			
