= United States at the 1983 World Championships in Athletics =

- Flag of the United States
- WA code: USA
- National federation: USA Track & Field
- Website: usatf.org

in Helsinki, Finland August 7–14, 1983
- Competitors: 101 (66tim l men and 35 women) in 41 events
- Medals Ranked 2nd: Gold 8 Silver 9 Bronze 7 Total 24

World Championships in Athletics appearances (overview)
- 1976; 1980; 1983; 1987; 1991; 1993; 1995; 1997; 1999; 2001; 2003; 2005; 2007; 2009; 2011; 2013; 2015; 2017; 2019; 2022; 2023; 2025

The United States competed at the 1983 World Championships in Athletics in Helsinki, Finland, from August 7 to 14, 1983. The championships were the first to feature both men and women's events and a full complement of events. The USA entered sixty-six men and thirty five women. The USA took home eight gold, nine silver and seven bronze medals. Ranking second in the medal table.

== Medalists ==
The following competitors from the United States won medals at the Championships

Medal	Athlete	Event
Gold	Carl Lewis	100 metres
Gold	Calvin Smith	400 metres
Gold	Greg Foster	110 metres hurdles
Gold	Edwin Moses	400 metres hurdles
Gold	Carl Lewis	Long jump
Gold	Mary Decker	1500 metres
Gold	Mary Decker	3000 metres
Gold	Willie Gault; Emmit King; Carl Lewis; Calvin Smith	4 × 100 metres relay
Silver	Calvin Smith	100 metres
Silver	Elliott Quow	200 metres
Silver	Michael Franks	400 metres
Silver	Steve Scott	1500 metres
Silver	Tyke Peacock	High jump
Silver	Jason Grimes	Long jump
Silver	Willie Banks	Triple jump
Silver	Tom Petranoff	Javelin
Silver	Marianne Dickerson	Marathon
Bronze	Emmit King	100 metres
Bronze	Sunder Nix	400 metres
Bronze	Willie Gault	110 metres hurdles
Bronze	Mike Conley	Long jump
Bronze	Diane Williams	100 metres
Bronze	Louise Ritter	High jump
Bronze	Carol Lewis	Long jump

=== Men ===
Track and road events

Athlete	Event	Heat		Quarterfinal		Semifinal		Final	
Athlete	Event	Result	Rank	Result	Rank	Result	Rank	Result	Rank
Emmit King	100 metres	10.41	17 Q	10.30	3 Q	10.36	5Q	10.24	3rd place, bronze medalist(s)
Carl Lewis	100 metres	10.34	10= Q	10.20	2 Q	10.28	2 Q	10.07	1st place, gold medalist(s)
Calvin Smith	100 metres	10.30	3 Q	10.27	2 Q	10.22	1 Q	10.21	2nd place, silver medalist(s)
Larry Myricks	200 metres	21.74	33	Did not advance					
Elliott Quow	200 metres	21.01	5 Q	20.80	7 Q	20.69	8 Q	20.41	2nd place, silver medalist(s)
Calvin Smith	200 metres	21.10	10 Q	20.60	1 Q	20.29	1 Q	20.14	1st place, gold medalist(s)
Michael Franks	400 metres	46.16	2 Q	45.57	1 Q	45.44	1 Q	45.22	2nd place, silver medalist(s)
Sunder Nix	400 metres	46.19	4 Q	46.19	11 Q	45.73	7 Q	45.24	3rd place, bronze medalist(s)
Eliot Tabron	400 metres	46.68	18 Q	46.54	20	Did not advance			
David Mack	800 metres	1:45.84	1 Q	—N/a		1:46.39	12	Did not advance	
David Patrick	800 metres	1:46.76	9 q	—N/a		1:46.66	17	1:46.56	8
James Robinson	800 metres	1:46.32	4 Q	—N/a		1:46.16	7 Q	1:45.12	5
Tom Byers	1500 metres	3:39.41	9 q	—N/a		3:43.97	22	Did not advance	
Sydney Maree	1500 metres	3:43.13	25 Q	—N/a		3:38.65	14	Did not advance	
Steve Scott	1500 metres	3:37.87	1 Q	—N/a		3:36.43	5 Q	3:41.87	2nd place, silver medalist(s)
Jim Hill	5000 metres	14:58.21	31 Q	—N/a		13:38.56	16	Did not advance	
Doug Padilla	5000 metres	13:44.71	24 Q	—N/a		13:32.90	8 Q	13:32.08	5
Jim Spivey	5000 metres	14:15.70	8 Q	—N/a		13:43.17	18	Did not advance	
Bill McChesney	10,000 metres	28:08.13	16 q	—N/a				28:34.46	15
Mark Nenow	10,000 metres	28:17.28	8 q	—N/a				28:17.28	13
Alberto Salazar	10,000 metres	28:10.10	18 q	—N/a				28:48.42	17
Benji Durden	Marathon	—N/a						2:20:38	39
Ed Mendoza	Marathon	—N/a						DNF	
Ron Tabb	Marathon	—N/a						2:13:38	18
Greg Foster	110 metres hurdles	13.41	1 Q	—N/a		13.22	1 Q	13.42	1st place, gold medalist(s)
Willie Gault	110 metres hurdles	13.66	7 Q	—N/a		13.48	2 Q	13.48	3rd place, bronze medalist(s)
Sam Turner	110 metres hurdles	13.62	6= Q	—N/a		13.65	5 Q	13.82	8
David Lee	400 metres hurdles	50.15	5 Q	—N/a		48.63	3 Q	49.32	6
Edwin Moses	400 metres hurdles	49.54	9= Q	—N/a		48.11	1 Q	47.50	1st place, gold medalist(s)
Andre Phillips	400 metres hurdles	50.44	4 Q	—N/a		48.99	4 Q	49.24	5
Brian Diemer	3000 metres steeplechase	8:24.92	6 Q	—N/a		8:23.39	13	Did not advance	
Henry Marsh	3000 metres steeplechase	8:27.46	12 Q	—N/a		8:23.18	9 Q	8:20.45	8
Rickey Pittman	3000 metres steeplechase	8:32.62	25	—N/a		Did not advance			
Willie Gault; Emmit King; Carl Lewis; Calvin Smith	4 × 100 metres relay	37.75	1 Q	—N/a		38.50	1 Q	37.86	1st place, gold medalist(s)
Alonzo Babers; Michael Franks*; Edwin Moses; Sunder Nix; Andre Phillips*; Willie Smith	4 × 400 metres relay	3:06.62	1 Q	—N/a		3:02.13	1 Q	3:05.29	5
Marco Evoniuk	20 kilometres walk	—N/a						DNF	
Jim Heiring	20 kilometres walk	—N/a						1:25:55	19
Tim Lewis	20 kilometres walk	—N/a						1:30:10	36
Marco Evoniuk	50 kilometres walk	—N/a						3:56:57	9
Jim Heiring	50 kilometres walk	—N/a						DNF	
Daniel O'Connor	50 kilometres walk	—N/a						4:18:41	23

* – Indicates the athlete competed in preliminaries but not the final

Field events

Athlete	Event	Qualification		Final	
Athlete	Event	Distance	Position	Distance	Position
Tyke Peacock	High jump	2.21	=3 q	2.32	2nd place, silver medalist(s)
Dwight Stones	High jump	2.21	=3 q	2.29	6
Leo Williams	High jump	2.21	=3 q	2.23	12
Jeff Buckingham	Pole vault	Cancelled		5.40	13
Billy Olson	Pole vault	Cancelled		NM	
Mike Tully	Pole vault	Cancelled		NM	
Mike Conley	Long jump	7.90	11 Q	8.12	3rd place, bronze medalist(s)
Jason Grimes	Long jump	8.29	11 Q	8.29	2nd place, silver medalist(s)
Carl Lewis	Long jump	8.37	1 Q	8.55 CR	1st place, gold medalist(s)
Willie Banks	Triple jump	16.58	9 Q	17.18	2nd place, silver medalist(s)
Mike Conley	Triple jump	16.90	1 Q	17.13	4
Al Joyner	Triple jump	16.65	6 Q	16.76	8
Kevin Akins	Shot put	19.48	13	Did not advance	
Dave Laut	Shot put	21.08	1 Q	20.60	4
Mike Lehmann	Shot put	19.88	7 q	19.69	10
Art Burns	Discus throw	61.88	10 q	63.22	8
Mac Wilkins	Discus throw	62.58	8 q	61.46	10
John Powell	Discus throw	58.96	15	Did not advance	
Rod Ewaliko	Javelin	82.68	11 q	77.74	11
Tom Petranoff	Javelin	85.68	5 Q	85.60	2nd place, silver medalist(s)
Bob Roggy	Javelin	86.16	3 Q	79.84	9
Ed Burke	Hammer throw	69.12	20	Did not advance	
John McArdle	Hammer throw	66.18	23	Did not advance	
Dave McKenzie	Hammer throw	69.94	19	Did not advance	

Combined events – Decathlon

Athlete	Event	100 m	LJ	SP	HJ	400 m	110H	DT	PV	JT	1500 m	Final	Rank
Mark Anderson	Result	11.39	6.83	13.61	DNS	—N/a						DNF	
Mark Anderson	Points	713	783	703	—N/a							DNF	
John Crist	Result	11.42	6.76	12.89	1.88	51.67	DNF	42.02	DNS	—N/a		DNF	
John Crist	Points	707	769	653	751	731	—N/a	724	—N/a			DNF	

=== Women ===
Track and road events

Athlete	Event	Heat		Quarterfinal		Semifinal		Final	
Athlete	Event	Result	Rank	Result	Rank	Result	Rank	Result	Rank
Evelyn Ashford	100 metres	11.15	1 Q	11.11	1Q	10.99	1 Q	DNF	
Alice Brown	100 metres	11.26	=5 Q	11.30	7 Q	11.33	12	Did not advance	
Diane Williams	100 metres	11.23	2 Q	11.25	=5 Q	11.21	5 Q	11.06	3rd place, bronze medalist(s)
Randy Givens	200 metres	23.01	1 Q	23.43	15 Q	23.34	14	Did not advance	
Florence Griffith	200 metres	22.74	5 Q	22.73	5 Q	22.59	1 Q	22.46	4
Roberta Belle	400 metres	53.01	6 Q	53.43	18	Did not advance			
Rosalyn Bryant	400 metres	53.64	12 Q	51.44	3 Q	51.04	4 Q	50.66	8
Denean Howard	400 metres	52.78	5 Q	52.34	15 Q	52.06	13	Did not advance	
Robin Campbell	800 metres	2:04.83	6 Q	—N/a		1:59.35	4 q	1:58.73	7
Cindy Bremser	1500 metres	4:14.10	15	—N/a				Did not advance	
Mary Decker	1500 metres	4:07.47	1 Q	—N/a				4:00.90	1st place, gold medalist(s)
Mary Decker	3000 metres	8:44.72	2 Q	—N/a				8:34.62	1st place, gold medalist(s)
Maggie Keyes-Kraft	3000 metres	9:01.97	18	—N/a				Did not advance	
Brenda Webb	3000 metres	9:24.38	24	—N/a				Did not advance	
Julie Brown	Marathon	—N/a						DNF	
Marianne Dickerson	Marathon	—N/a						2:31:09	2nd place, silver medalist(s)
Debbie Eide	Marathon	—N/a						2:36:17	12
Benita Fitzgerald	100 metres hurdles	13.67	23 Q	13.15	9 Q'	12.96	6 Q	12.99	8
Pam Page	100 metres hurdles	13.18	9 Q	13.12	10 Q	13.24	12	Did not advance	
Candy Young	100 metres hurdles	DNF		Did not advance					
Sharrieffa Barksdale	400 metres hurdles	56.60	9= Q	—N/a		56.81	11	Did not advance	
Judi Brown	400 metres hurdles	57.14	15 Q	—N/a		57.98	15	Did not advance	
Tonja Brown	400 metres hurdles	58.00	17	—N/a		Did not advance			
Alice Brown; Chandra Cheeseborough; Randy Givens; Diane Williams	4 × 100 metres relay	44.20	9	—N/a				Did not advance	
Roberta Belle; Rosalyn Bryant; Easter Gabriel; Denean Howard	4 × 400 metres relay	3:26.82	1 Q	—N/a				3:27.57	5

Field events

Athlete	Event	Qualification		Final	
Athlete	Event	Distance	Position	Distance	Position
Louise Ritter	High jump	1.90	5 Q	1.95	3rd place, bronze medalist(s)
Coleen Sommer	High jump	1.90	1= Q	1.95	4
Carol Lewis	Long jump	6.78	1 Q	7.04	3rd place, bronze medalist(s)
Gwen Loud	Long jump	6.37	13	Did not advance	
Jackie Joyner-Kersee	Long jump	DNS			
Lorna Griffin	Shot put	16.50	15	Did not advance	
Carol Cady	Discus throw	57.34	15	Did not advance	
Karin Smith	Javelin	54.52	9 q	59.76	10

Combined events – Heptathlon

Athlete	Event	100H	HJ	SP	200 m	LJ	JT	800 m	Final	Rank
Jane Frederick	Result	13.72	1.83	14.75	25.16	6.00	45.62	DNS	DNF	
Jane Frederick	Points	901	942	881	836	906	853	—N/a	DNF	
Marlene Harmon	Result	14.17	1.74	11.91	24.92	6.17	36.06	2:12.16	5925	11
Marlene Harmon	Points	844	892	699	851	943	793	903	5925	11
Jackie Joyner	Result	13.69	1.86	12.73	23.73	DNS	Did not advance		DNF	
Jackie Joyner	Points	905	953	768	961	—N/a			DNF	
