= Athletics at the 1986 Commonwealth Games – Men's 4 × 400 metres relay =

Men's 4 × 400 metres relay

Men's 4 × 400 metres relay at the Commonwealth Games

The men's 4 × 400 metres relay event at the 1986 Commonwealth Games was held on 2 August at the Meadowbank Stadium in Edinburgh.

== Results ==
| Rank | Nation | Athletes | Time | Notes |
|---|---|---|---|---|
| 1st place, gold medalist(s) | England | Kriss Akabusi, Roger Black, Todd Bennett, Phil Brown | 3:07.19 | |
| 2nd place, silver medalist(s) | Australia | Bruce Frayne, Miles Murphy, David Johnston, Darren Clark | 3:07.81 | |
| 3rd place, bronze medalist(s) | Canada | Anton Skerritt, Andre Smith, John Graham, Atlee Mahorn | 3:08.69 | |
| 4 | Scotland | Martin Johnston, Tom McKean, Paul Forbes, Brian Whittle | 3:18.03 | |
| | Botswana | Sunday Maweni, Joseph Ramotshabi, Zacharia Machangani, Bigboy Matlapeng | DQ | |
| | Northern Ireland | | DNS | |
