= Athletics at the 1986 Commonwealth Games – Men's 800 metres =

Men's 800 metres at the Commonwealth Games

The men's 800 metres event at the 1986 Commonwealth Games was held on 28 and 31 July at the Meadowbank Stadium in Edinburgh.

== Medalists ==
Gold	Silver	Bronze
Steve Cram; England	Tom McKean; Scotland	Peter Elliott; England

== Results ==
=== Heats ===
Qualification: First 4 of each heat (Q) and the next 4 fastest (q) qualified for the semifinals.

Rank	Heat	Name	Nationality	Time	Notes
1	1	Pat Scammell	Australia	1:49.68	Q
2	1	Peter Elliott	England	1:49.73	Q
3	1	Mal Edwards	Wales	1:49.81	Q
4	1	Paul Forbes	Scotland	1:50.07	Q
5	1	Joseph Ramotshabi	Botswana	1:50.07	q
6	1	Isaac Ganunga	Malawi	1:50.78	q
7	3	Peter Bourke	Australia	1:51.23	Q
8	3	Steve Cram	England	1:51.42	Q
9	3	Simon Hoogewerf	Canada	1:51.90	Q
10	3	Paul Williams	Wales	1:52.55	Q
11	2	Sebastian Coe	England	1:53.13	Q
12	2	Brian Thompson	Canada	1:53.25	Q
13	2	Mark Kirk	Northern Ireland	1:53.29	Q
14	2	Tom McKean	Scotland	1:53.31	Q
15	1	John Chappory	Gibraltar	1:53.38	q
16	2	Nick Hand	Guernsey	1:53.45	q
17	2	Mike Guegan	Jersey	1:53.97	
18	3	Binesh Prasad	Fiji	1:55.13	
19	3	Avelino Baldachino	Gibraltar	1:55.14	
20	2	Gideon Mthembu	Swaziland	1:55.77	
21	1	Sawelio Lutuni	Fiji	1:58.09	

=== Semifinals ===
Qualification: First 4 of each semifinal qualified directly (Q) for the final.

Rank	Heat	Name	Nationality	Time	Notes
1	2	Peter Elliott	England	1:47.42	Q
2	2	Simon Hoogewerf	Canada	1:47.63	Q
3	2	Sebastian Coe	England	1:48.07	Q
4	2	Paul Forbes	Scotland	1:48.29	Q
5	2	Peter Bourke	Australia	1:48.40	
6	2	Paul Williams	Wales	1:48.52	
7	1	Steve Cram	England	1:48.71	Q
8	1	Tom McKean	Scotland	1:49.02	Q
9	1	Pat Scammell	Australia	1:49.24	Q
10	1	Mal Edwards	Wales	1:49.33	Q
11	1	Mark Kirk	Northern Ireland	1:49.69	
12	1	Joseph Ramotshabi	Botswana	1:49.98	
13	1	Brian Thompson	Canada	1:50.25	
14	2	Isaac Ganunga	Malawi	1:50.88	
15	1	Nick Hand	Guernsey	1:54.83	
16	2	John Chappory	Gibraltar	1:55.29	

=== Final ===
Rank	Name	Nationality	Time	Notes
1st place, gold medalist(s)	Steve Cram	England	1:43.22	GR
2nd place, silver medalist(s)	Tom McKean	Scotland	1:44.80	PB
3rd place, bronze medalist(s)	Peter Elliott	England	1:45.42	
4	Pat Scammell	Australia	1:45.86	
5	Mal Edwards	Wales	1:47.27	
6	Simon Hoogewerf	Canada	1:49.04	
7	Paul Forbes	Scotland	1:51.29	
	Sebastian Coe	England	DNS	
