= Peter Bourke =

Peter Bourke may refer to:

- Peter Bourke (runner) (born 1958), Australian middle-distance runner
- Peter Bourke (footballer, born 1883) (1883–1951), Australian rules footballer for South Melbourne
- Peter Bourke (footballer, born 1966), Australian rules footballer for Fitzroy and Essendon
