= Ainsley Bennett =

British sprinter

Personal information
- Nationality: British (English/Jamaican)
- Born: 22 July 1954 (age 72) Saint Catherine Parish, Jamaica
- Height: 168 cm (5 ft 6 in)
- Weight: 62 kg (137 lb)

Sport
- Sport: Athletics
- Event: Sprints
- Club: Birchfield Harriers
Medal record
Representing Great Britain
World Championships
Bronze medal – third place	1983 Helsinki	4x400m relay
European Indoor Championships
Silver medal – second place	1983 Budapest	400m
Summer Universiade
Bronze medal – third place	1979 Mexico City	100m
Bronze medal – third place	1979 Mexico City	200m

Ainsley Bennett (born 22 July 1954) is a British former sprinter from Birmingham, England, who competed at the 1976 Summer Olympics.

== Biography ==
Born in Jamaica but brought up in Birmingham, England, Bennett attended Naseby Secondary Modern School (now Park View), in the area known as Alum Rock, Birmingham. This school also produced a Republic of Ireland International cross-country runner, Paul O'Callaghan, who competed in six World Cross Country Running Championships.

Ainsley competed for Birchfield Harriers based in Perry Barr in North Birmingham and finished third behind American Mark Lutz in the 200 metres event at the 1974 AAA Championships. The following year he was runner-up behind another American Steve Riddick in both the 100 and 200 metres events at the 1974 AAA Championships but by virtue of being the highest placed British athlete in those events he was considered both the British 100 metres champion and the British 200 metres champion.

At the 1976 Olympics Games in Montreal, he represented Great Britain, where he reached the semi-finals of the men's 200m sprint race, as well as being one of the men's 4 × 400 m relay team which failed to progress further than the first heats.

Bennett was on the podium at the AAA Championships twice more in 1976 and 1979 and won a bronze medal in the 4 x 400 metres relay at the 1983 World Championships in Athletics in Helsinki, with teammates Garry Cook, Todd Bennett and Philip Brown, in a time of 3:03.53, finishing behind the Soviet Union and West Germany.

After finishing his athletics career, Bennett founded an events management and corporate hospitality business using his contacts to specialise in tickets. Bennett is also a Trustee for Birchfield Harriers.

== Career personal bests ==
- 100m – 10.21 (1979)
- 200m – 20.42 (1979)
- 400m – 46.15 (1975)
