= Barbados at the 1983 World Championships in Athletics =

- Flag of Barbados
- WA code: BAR

in Helsinki, Finland August 7–14, 1983
- Competitors: 2 (1 man and 1 woman) in 4 events
- Medals: Gold 0 Silver 0 Bronze 0 Total 0

World Championships in Athletics appearances
- 1983; 1987; 1991; 1993; 1995; 1997; 1999; 2001; 2003; 2005; 2007; 2009; 2011; 2013; 2015; 2017; 2019; 2022; 2023; 2025

Barbados competed at the 1983 World Championships in Athletics in Helsinki, Finland, which were held from 7 to 14 August 1983. The athlete delegation of the nation consisted of two competitors, sprinter and middle-distance runner Gordan Hinds and sprinter and hurdler June Caddle. Both of them did not advance past the qualifying heats of there entered events.

== Background ==
The 1983 World Championships in Athletics were held at the Helsinki Olympic Stadium in Helsinki, Finland. Under the auspices of the International Amateur Athletics Federation, this was the first edition of the World Championships. It was held from 7 to 14 August 1983 and had 41 different events. Among the nations that competed was Barbados. For this edition of the World Championships in Athletics, sprinter and middle-distance runner Gordan Hinds and sprinter and hurdler June Caddle competed.

== Men ==
For the qualifying heats of the men's 400 metres on 7 August in the first heat. He competed against six other athletes. There, he recorded a time of 47.55 seconds and placed sixth, failing to advance further to the quarterfinals. He also competed in the qualifying heats of the men's 800 metres in the same day, doing so in the fifth heat. He competed against six other athletes. There, he recorded a time of 1:50.92 and placed fifth, again failing to advance further to the quarterfinals.

Track and road events

Athlete	Event	Heat		Quarterfinal		Semifinal		Final	
Athlete	Event	Result	Rank	Result	Rank	Result	Rank	Result	Rank
Gordan Hinds	400 metres	47.55	6	Did not advance					
Gordan Hinds	800 metres	1:50.92	5	—N/a		Did not advance			

== Women ==
Caddle first competed in the qualifying heats of the women's 100 metres on 7 August in the third heat. She competed against six other athletes. There, she recorded a time of 12.56 seconds and placed sixth, failing to advance further to the quarterfinals. She then competed in the qualifying heats of the women's 100 metres hurdles on 12 August in the third heat. She competed against six other athletes. There, she recorded a time of 14.89 seconds and placed last in her heat, failing to advance further to the quarterfinals.

Track and road events

Athlete	Event	Heat		Quarterfinal		Semifinal		Final	
Athlete	Event	Result	Rank	Result	Rank	Result	Rank	Result	Rank
June Caddle	100 metres	12.56	6	Did not advance					
June Caddle	100 metres hurdles	14.89	7	Did not advance					
