= John Chappory =

Gibraltarian athlete

Personal information
- Born: 29 July 1962 (age 63)

Sport
- Sport: Athletics
- Event(s): 800 metres, 1500 metres

John Chappory (born 29 July 1962) is a retired Gibraltarian middle-distance runner. He represented his country at the 1983 and 1987 World Championships as well as two editions of Commonwealth Games and European Championships.

== International competitions ==
Year	Competition	Venue	Position	Event	Notes
Representing Gibraltar
1979	European Junior Championships	Bydgoszcz, Poland	21st (h)	800 m	1:54.42
1981	European Junior Championships	Utrecht, Netherlands	23rd (h)	800 m	1:54.81
1982	European Championships	Athens, Greece	26th (h)	800 m	1:53.02
1982	European Championships	Athens, Greece	29th (h)	1500 m	3:57.91
1982	Commonwealth Games	Brisbane, Australia	33rd (qf)	400 m	49.82
1982	Commonwealth Games	Brisbane, Australia	23rd (h)	800 m	1:55.65
1983	World Championships	Helsinki, Finland	49th (h)	800 m	1:52.30
1983	World Championships	Helsinki, Finland	46th (h)	1500 m	3:56.92
1985	World Cross Country Championships	Lisbon, Portugal	254th	800 m	NT
1986	Commonwealth Games	Edinburgh, United Kingdom	17th (h)	400 m	50.65
1986	Commonwealth Games	Edinburgh, United Kingdom	16th (sf)	800 m	1:55.29
1986	European Championships	Stuttgart, West Germany	27th (h)	800 m	1:57.45
1987	World Championships	Rome, Italy	42nd (h)	800 m	1:54.32
1987	Island Games	Guernsey	1st	800 m	1:57.9
1987	Island Games	Guernsey	1st	1500 m	4:02.5
1989	Island Games	Faroe Islands	2nd	800 m	1:56.4

== Personal bests ==
Outdoor

- 800 metres – 1:51.17 (Barcelona 1984)
- 1500 metres – 3:51.9 (Granada 1984)
- Half marathon – 1:07:31 (Málaga 1982)
