= Chris McGeorge =

English middle-distance runner

Personal information
- Nationality: British (English)
- Born: 13 January 1962 (age 64) Carlisle, England

Sport
- Sport: Athletics
- Event: middle-distance
- Club: Cockermouth AC
Medal record
Athletics
Representing Great Britain
Summer Universiade
Gold medal – first place	1985 Kobe	1500m
Representing England
Commonwealth Games
Bronze medal – third place	1982 Brisbane	800m

Christopher Anthony McGeorge (born 13 January 1962) is a British track and field athlete who was the 1985 Summer Universiade champion in the 1500 metres.

== Biography ==
McGeorge was born in Carlisle, Cumberland and was a member of the Cockermouth Athletics Club.

McGeorge was on the podium for three consecutive years at the AAA Championships at the 1981 AAA Championships, 1982 AAA Championships and 1983 AAA Championships.

Representing England, he won a bronze medal in the 800 metres at the 1982 Commonwealth Games in Brisbane, Australia. This was Britain's first medal in this event for 28 years.

He was the 1988 winner of the Emsley Carr Mile. Nationally, he was the AAA Indoor Championships 800 m winner in 1982, He was also third in the 1500 m at the 1989 UK Athletics Championships.

McGeorge would have likely won more accolades but was unlucky to have peaked during the golden age of British middle-distance running, when Sebastian Coe, Steve Ovett, Steve Cram and Peter Elliott all raced.

== International competitions ==
Year	Competition	Venue	Position	Event	Notes
1982	Commonwealth Games	Brisbane, Australia	3rd	800 m	1:45.60
1985	Universiade	Kobe, Japan	1st	1500 m	3:46.22

== National titles ==
- AAA Indoor Championships
  - 800 m: 1982

== See also ==
- List of Commonwealth Games medallists in athletics (men)
- List of middle-distance runners

== Coaching career ==
In 2001 Chris and his wife Sonia McGeorge began their coaching careers.

The pair work as a team and are based in Loughborough.

Chris and Sonia coach/support notable endurance athletes including Charlotte Moore, Matthew Stonier, Luke Nuttall, Izzy Fry and Ben Pattison.

In 2022 Chris and Sonia's coaching work was recognised by England Athletics as they were presented with the Dave Sunderland Coaching Award.
