= Susumu Takano =

Japanese sprinter

Personal information
- Nationality: Japan
- Born: 21 May 1961 (age 65) Fujinomiya, Shizuoka Prefecture, Japan
- Height: 1.78 m (5 ft 10 in)
- Weight: 69 kg (152 lb)

Sport
- Sport: Track and field
- Event: Sprints
- University team: Tokai University
- Retired: January 1996
- Now coaching: Tokai University Track and Field Club

Achievements and titles
- Personal bests: 200 m: 20.74 (Kofu 1986); 400 m: 44.78 (Tokyo 1991) NR
Medal record
Men's athletics
Representing Japan
Asian Games
Gold medal – first place	1982 New Delhi	400 m
Gold medal – first place	1986 Seoul	400 m
Gold medal – first place	1986 Seoul	4×400 m relay
Gold medal – first place	1990 Beijing	200 m
Bronze medal – third place	1990 Beijing	4×100 m relay

Susumu Takano (高野 進, Takano Susumu; born 21 May 1961) is a Japanese former sprinter who competed in the 1984 Summer Olympics, in the 1988 Summer Olympics, and in the 1992 Summer Olympics.

== Personal bests ==
Event	Time	Wind	Venue	Date	Notes
Outdoor
200 m	20.74 s	-0.4 m/s	Kofu, Japan	15 October 1986	
400 m	44.78 s		Tokyo, Japan	16 June 1991	Japan's record

== Records ==
- 200 metres
  - Former Japanese record holder - 20.74 s (wind: -0.4 m/s) (Kofu, 15 October 1986)
- 300 metres
  - Former Japanese record holder - 32.97 s (Chiba, 11 September 1988)
- 400 metres
  - Current Japanese record holder - 44.78 s (Tokyo, 16 June 1991)
  - Former Japanese university record holder - 45.85 s (Walnut, 25 July 1984)
- 4 × 100 m relay
  - Former Japanese record holder - 38.90 s (relay leg: 4th) (Seoul, 1 October 1988)^{[a]}
- 4 × 400 m relay
  - Former Japanese record holder - 3:01.26 s (relay leg: 2nd) (Tokyo, 31 August 1991)^{[b]}

^{a} with Shinji Aoto, Kenji Yamauchi, and Koji Kurihara
^{b} with Koichi Konakatomi, Takahiro Watanabe, and Koji Ito

== International competition record ==
Year	Competition	Venue	Position	Event	Notes
Representing Japan
1982	Asian Games	New Delhi, India	6th	200 m	21.68
1982	Asian Games	New Delhi, India	1st	400 m	46.65
1983	World Championships	Helsinki, Finland	25th (qf)	400 m	47.06
1983	World Championships	Helsinki, Finland	13th (sf)	4 × 400 m relay	3:07.11 (relay leg: 4th)
1984	Olympic Games	Los Angeles, United States	15th (sf)	400 m	45.88
1984	Olympic Games	Los Angeles, United States	15th (sf)	4 × 400 m relay	3:10.73 (relay leg: 1st)
1986	Asian Games	Seoul, South Korea	1st	400 m	45.00 NR
1986	Asian Games	Seoul, South Korea	1st	4 × 400 m relay	3:02.33 (relay leg: 4th) AR
1987	World Championships	Rome, Italy	18th (qf)	400 m	45.81
1987	World Championships	Rome, Italy	14th (sf)	4 × 400 m relay	3:04.86 (relay leg: 4th)
1988	Olympic Games	Seoul, South Korea	9th (sf)	400 m	44.90 NR
1988	Olympic Games	Seoul, South Korea	8th (sf)	4 × 100 m relay	38.90 (relay leg: 4th) NR
1988	Olympic Games	Seoul, South Korea	8th (sf)	4 × 400 m relay	3:03.80 (relay leg: 4th)
1989	World Cup	Barcelona, Spain	8th	4 × 100 m relay	39.32 (relay leg: 2nd)
1990	Asian Games	Beijing, China	1st	200 m	20.94 (wind: -1.6 m/s)
1990	Asian Games	Beijing, China	3rd	4 × 100 m relay	39.61 (relay leg: 2nd)
1991	World Championships	Tokyo, Japan	7th	400 m	45.39
1991	World Championships	Tokyo, Japan	7th (h)	4 × 400 m relay	3:01.26 (relay leg: 2nd) NR
1992	Olympic Games	Barcelona, Spain	8th	400 m	45.18
1992	Olympic Games	Barcelona, Spain	7th (h)	4 × 400 m relay	3:01.35 (relay leg: 2nd)

== National championships ==
He has won the individual national championship 8 times.

- 1 win in the 200 metres (1983)
- 7 wins in the 400 metres (1982, 1985, 1986, 1987, 1988, 1991, 1992)
