= Odiya Silweya =

Malawian sprinter

Personal information
- Nationality: Malawian
- Born: 1 January 1959 (age 67)

Sport
- Sport: Sprinting
- Event: 100 metres

Odiya Silweya (born 1 January 1959) is a Malawian sprinter. He competed in the men's 100 metres at the 1984 Summer Olympics.

Silweya represented Malawi in two Summer Olympics and two Commonwealth Games in the 1980s. He competed at the 1982 Commonwealths in the 100 m and 200 m, and 1986 Commonwealths in the 200 m and 400 m. At the 1984 Olympics he competed in the 100 m and 200 m, while at the 1988 Games he entered in the 200 m and 400 m. He advanced past the first round in all four of his Commonwealth appearances, posting a best finish of 7th in his 1986 200 m and 400 m semi-finals.

At the 1987 All-Africa Games, Silweya ran 2nd leg on the Malawian 4 × 400 metres relay team, setting a national record of 3:11.97 that ranked 38th in the world that year.
