= 1980 AAA Championships =

Outdoor track and field competition

- Dates: 5–6 September 1980
- Host city: London, England
- Venue: Crystal Palace National Sports Centre
- Level: Senior
- Type: Outdoor

The 1980 AAA Championships sponsored by Nationwide was the 1980 edition of the annual outdoor track and field competition organised by the Amateur Athletic Association (AAA). It was held from 5 to 6 September 1980 at the Crystal Palace National Sports Centre in London, England.

== Summary ==
The Championships covered two days of competition. The marathon was held in Milton Keynes and the decathlon was held in Cwmbran.

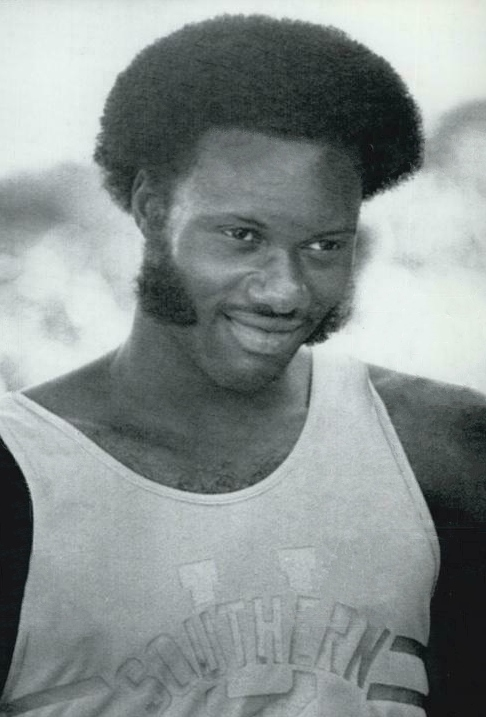
Rod Milburn won the sprint hurdles

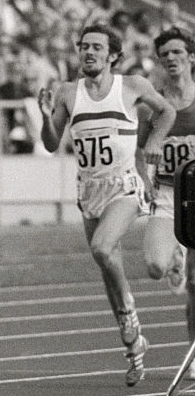
Steve Ovett won his last AAAA title

== Results ==
Event	Gold		Silver		Bronze	
100m	(Scotland) Allan Wells	10.36	(Jamaica) Don Quarrie	10.57	Mike McFarlane	10.60
200m	(United States) Mel Lattany	20.74	(United States) Steve Williams	20.93	Trevor Hoyte	21.19
400m	Rod Milne	46.53	Roy Dickens	46.56	Steve Scutt	46.60
800m	(Sudan) Omer Khalifa	1:47.43	(Kenya) James Maina Boi	1:47.91	(Scotland) Paul Forbes	1:48.31
1 mile	Steve Ovett	4:04.40	(New Zealand) John Walker	4:04.62	Colin Reitz	4:06.43
5,000m	(West Germany) Harald Hudak	13:51.71	Dick Callan	13:52.49	Steve Binns	13:53.25
10,000m	Nick Rose	28:11.98	(Wales) Steve Jones	28:13.25	Bernie Ford	28:27.78
marathon	Ian Thompson	2:14:00	Dave Black	2:14:28	Andy Holden	2:15:18
3000m steeplechase	(Wales) Roger Hackney	8:39.38	(Scotland) Gordon Rimmer	8:39.91	Ron Harris	8:40.73
110m hurdles	(United States) Rod Milburn	13.69	Mark Holtom	13.71	(United States) Ashland Whitfield	14.01
400m hurdles	(United States) James King	49.50	Bill Hartley	50.04	Gary Oakes	50.23
3,000m walk	(Wales) Steve Barry	12:00.44	Richard Dorman	12:24.45	Ian Richards	12:26.47
10,000m walk	Roger Mills	43:21.2	(New Zealand) Mike Parker	43:39.6	Gordon Vale	43:57.6
high jump	(West Germany) Carlo Thränhardt	2.23	Mark Naylor	2.20	Rupert Charles	2.14
pole vault	Brian Hooper	5.59 NR	Keith Stock	5.57 NR	Jeff Gutteridge	5.10
long jump	(United States) Arnie Robinson	7.92	Gus Udo	7.64	Aston Moore	7.53
triple jump	(United States) Paul Jordan	16.49	Aston Moore	16.49	Frank Attoh	15.98
shot put	(United States) Brian Oldfield	21.25	Geoff Capes	20.10	Mike Winch	17.97
discus throw	(United States) Brian Oldfield	61.46	Peter Tancred	59.46	(Scotland) Colin Sutherland	54.40
hammer throw	Martin Girvan	68.72	(Republic of Ireland) Seán Egan	66.94	Bob Weir	65.86
javelin throw	(Hungary) Miklós Németh	83.34	(New Zealand) Mike O'Rourke	81.04	David Ottley	80.38
decathlon	(Scotland) Brad McStravick	7663	Pan Zeniou	7497	Buster Watson	7443

== See also ==
- 1980 WAAA Championships
