= Gordon Hinds =

Barbadian athlete

Personal information
- Born: 12 October 1961 (age 64)
- Education: Adelphi University

Sport
- Sport: Athletics
- Event(s): 400 metres, 800 metres
- College team: Adelphi Panthers

Gordon Hinds (born 12 October 1961) is a retired Barbadian athlete who competed in the 400 and 800 metres. He represented his country at the inaugural 1983 World Championships in Helsinki.

== International competitions ==
Year	Competition	Venue	Position	Event	Notes
Representing Barbados
1980	CARIFTA Games	Hamilton, Bermuda	4th	400 m	48.53
1980	CARIFTA Games	Hamilton, Bermuda	3rd	800 m	1:55.3
1982	Commonwealth Games	Brisbane, Australia	21st (qf)	400 m	48.48
1982	Commonwealth Games	Brisbane, Australia	15th (h)	800 m	1:53.96
1982	Commonwealth Games	Brisbane, Australia	5th	4 × 400 m relay	3:12.44
1983	World Championships	Helsinki, Finland	34th (h)	400 m	47.55
1983	World Championships	Helsinki, Finland	47th (h)	800 m	1:50.92
1983	Pan American Games	Caracas, Venezuela	8th (h)	800 m	1:50.31^{1}

^{1}Did not start in the final
