= Athletics at the 1983 Pan American Games – Men's 800 metres =

Men's 800 metres at the Pan American Games

The men's 800 metres event at the 1983 Pan American Games was held in Caracas, Venezuela on 23 and 24 August.

== Medalists ==
Gold	Silver	Bronze
Agberto Guimarães; Brazil	José Luíz Barbosa; Brazil	Stanley Redwine; United States

== Results ==
=== Heats ===
Rank	Heat	Name	Nationality	Time	Notes
1	2	Stanley Redwine	United States	1:48.67	Q
2	1	José Luíz Barbosa	Brazil	1:49.55	Q
3	1	James Mays	United States	1:49.55	Q
4	2	William Wuycke	Venezuela	1:49.57	Q
5	2	Agberto Guimarães	Brazil	1:49.95	Q
6	1	Ángel Román	Venezuela	1:49.99	Q
7	1	Oslen Barr	Guyana	1:50.07	q
8	2	Gordon Hinds	Barbados	1:50.31	q
9	2	Anthony West	Trinidad and Tobago	1:50.36	
10	1	Reuben Bayley	Barbados	1:50.43	
11	2	Héctor Herrera	Cuba	1:51.01	
12	2	Luis Munguía	Nicaragua	1:53.03	
13	1	Dale Jones	Antigua and Barbuda	1:53.07	
14	2	Jyme Bridges	Antigua and Barbuda	2:00.06	
	1	Alberto Juantorena	Cuba	DNS	

=== Final ===
Rank	Name	Nationality	Time	Notes
1st place, gold medalist(s)	Agberto Guimarães	Brazil	1:46.31	
2nd place, silver medalist(s)	José Luíz Barbosa	Brazil	1:46.65	
3rd place, bronze medalist(s)	Stanley Redwine	United States	1:47.26	
4	Oslen Barr	Guyana	1:47.39	
5	James Mays	United States	1:47.65	
6	Ángel Román	Venezuela	1:52.13	
	William Wuycke	Venezuela	DNF	
	Gordon Hinds	Barbados	DNS	
