= Gideon Mthembu =

Swazi sports official and retired runner (born 1963)

Personal information
- Born: September 25, 1963 (age 62)

Sport
- Sport: Marathon running

Gideon Buthana Mthembu (born September 25, 1963) is a Swazi sports official and retired runner.

He finished 53rd in the 1988 Olympic marathon. His personal best time was 2:17.08 hours, achieved in 1987. He also competed in the 800 and 1500 metres at the 1986 Commonwealth Games without reaching the final.

He served as president of the Athletics Association of Swaziland from 2008 to 2012.
