= Anton Skerritt =

Personal information
- Date of birth: January 3, 1964 (age 62)
- Place of birth: Port of Spain, Trinidad & Tobago
- Position: Defender

Senior career*
Years	Team	Apps	(Gls)
1994	St. Catharines Wolves		
1995	Toronto Italia		
1996	St. Catharines Wolves		
1997	Hamilton White Eagles		
2002–2003	Metro Lions		
Medal record
Men's athletics
Representing Canada
Commonwealth Games
Bronze medal – third place	1986 Edinburgh	4×400 m relay
- * Club domestic league appearances and goals as of November 18, 2016

Anton Skerritt (born January 3, 1964) is a Trinidadian/Canadian former sprinter, and soccer player. As a sprinter he competed in the 1984 Summer Olympics, 1988 Summer Olympics, 1987 World Championships in Athletics, 1986 Commonwealth Games, and the 1989 Jeux de la Francophonie.

As a soccer player he played in the Canadian National Soccer League, and the Canadian Professional Soccer League. After his retirement from professional sports he became a vice principal for Vaughan Secondary School in Vaughan, Ontario.

== Athletics career ==
In 1982, Skerritt began playing soccer at the college level with Howard University. After a recommendation from an American national track and field team coach he switched to track and field, becoming an All-American for the Howard Bison track and field team. He was chosen to represent Trinidad & Tobago in the 1984 Summer Olympics to compete in Men's 400 metres, and the Men's 4×400 metres Relay.

In 1986, he switched his allegiance to Canada for the 1986 Commonwealth Games and won a bronze medal in the 4×400 metres relay. At the 1987 World Championships in Athletics he achieved a Canadian record of 45.62secs in the 400 metres event. He featured in the 1988 Summer Olympics, 1989 Jeux de la Francophonie, and the 1991 Pan American Games. In the Francophonie Games he won 3 medals in 400 metres, 4×100 metres relay, and 4×400 metres relay. He retired in 1992 to pursue his education in teaching.

== Football career ==
In 1994, he returned to professional soccer to play with St. Catharines Wolves of the Canadian National Soccer League. The following season he signed with Toronto Italia, and also had a stint in the Canadian International Soccer League with the Caribbean Stars. In 1996, he returned to St. Catharines where he won the Umbro Cup and reached the CNSL Championship finals against Toronto Italia but lost the series by a score of 11-0 on goals on aggregate.

In 1997, he signed with the Hamilton White Eagles, but was released midway through the season as the league suspended the organization for the remainder of the season. In 2002, he signed with expansion franchise the Metro Lions of the Canadian Professional Soccer League. In their debut season the Lions secured a postseason berth by finishing third in the Eastern Conference. In the semi-finals they faced the Ottawa Wizards, but suffered a 1-0 defeat. He returned for a second season with the Lions, and helped the club reach the finals of the Open Canada Cup tournament where they lost the match to London City 4-2 on penalties.
