= Rod Milne =

British sprinter

Personal information
- Nationality: British (English)
- Born: 15 March 1957 (age 69) Kirkuk, Iraq
- Height: 185 cm (6 ft 1 in)
- Weight: 72 kg (159 lb)

Sport
- Sport: Athletics
- Event: Sprinting/400m
- Club: Thames Valley Harriers

Roderic Bruce William Milne (born 15 March 1957) is a British sprinter who competed at the 1980 Summer Olympics.

== Biography ==
Milne became the British 400 metres champion after winning the British AAA Championships title at the 1980 AAA Championships. Shortly afterwards he represented Great Britain in the men's 4 × 400 metres relay at the 1980 Olympics Games in Moscow.

Milne is the founder and managing director of HFS Milbourne Financial Services Ltd, which he set up in October 1986. in March 2021 HFS Milbourne was acquired by Evelyn Partners.
