= Viktor Markin =

Soviet athletics competitor (born 1957)

Personal information
- Born: 23 February 1957 (age 69) Oktyabrsky, Ust-Tarksky District, Novosibirsk Oblast

Sport
- Sport: Track and field
Medal record
Representing the Soviet Union
Olympic Games
Gold medal – first place	1980 Moscow	400 m
Gold medal – first place	1980 Moscow	4×400 m relay
World Championships
Gold medal – first place	1983 Helsinki	4×400 m relay
European Championships
Bronze medal – third place	1982 Athens	400 m
Bronze medal – third place	1982 Athens	4×400 m relay
Summer Universiade
Gold medal – first place	1981 Bucharest	4x400 m relay
Silver medal – second place	1983 Edmonton	4x400 m relay

Viktor Fyodorovich Markin (Russian: Виктор Фёдорович Маркин; born 23 February 1957) is a former Soviet athlete, winner of two gold medals at the 1980 Summer Olympics.

After graduating from a secondary school he went to Novosibirsk, where he entered the Faculty of Pediatrics of the Institute of Medicine. Markin started athletics only at age 19 in the athletics section by the institute, coached by Aleksandr Bukhasheyev. He remained quite unknown until the Moscow Olympic Games.

On 27 April 1980, in Sochi, Markin ran a new personal best in the one lap event of 46.96 seconds. In early July Markin ran 45.34 at the Central Lenin Stadium. In the Olympic final on July 30, Markin was only fifth at the halfway mark and as the final straight opened he was still three metres behind the leader Frank Schaffer of East Germany. But with a very strong finish Markin won with a European record and world season best 44.60 (still the Russian national record over 400 m). Markin captured his second gold in the 4 × 400 m relay when, as an anchor, he outran the winner of the 400 metre hurdles, East German Volker Beck.

After a break from sports to complete his studies in medicine, Markin returned at the European Championships in 1982, where he won two bronze medals (400 m and 4 × 400 m relay). At the inaugural World Championships in Helsinki Markin, the only Soviet competing in the individual 400 metres (as the rest were concentrating on the relay), was knocked out of the final in an extremely close photo finish by eventual bronze medalist Sunder Nix of the United States. However, he finished on a high note as in the last event of the Championships, the 4 × 400 m relay, the Soviets won an unexpected gold. West Germany already lost their winning chances on the first leg as Erwin Skamrahl (who had broken Markin's European record just three weeks earlier) gave up more than ten meters to Sergey Lovachov; the other main favorites, United States, hung with the Soviets for two and a half legs until Willie Smith tumbled and fell, leaving Markin an easy job to anchor home a USSR victory.

Markin decided to retire after hearing the Soviet decision to boycott the 1984 Summer Olympics.

Records
Preceded by (West Germany) Karl Honz	European Record Holder Men's 400m 30 July 1980 – 25 July 1983	Succeeded by (West Germany) Erwin Skamrahl
