= Athletics at the 1982 Commonwealth Games =

Athletics at the 12th Commonwealth Games
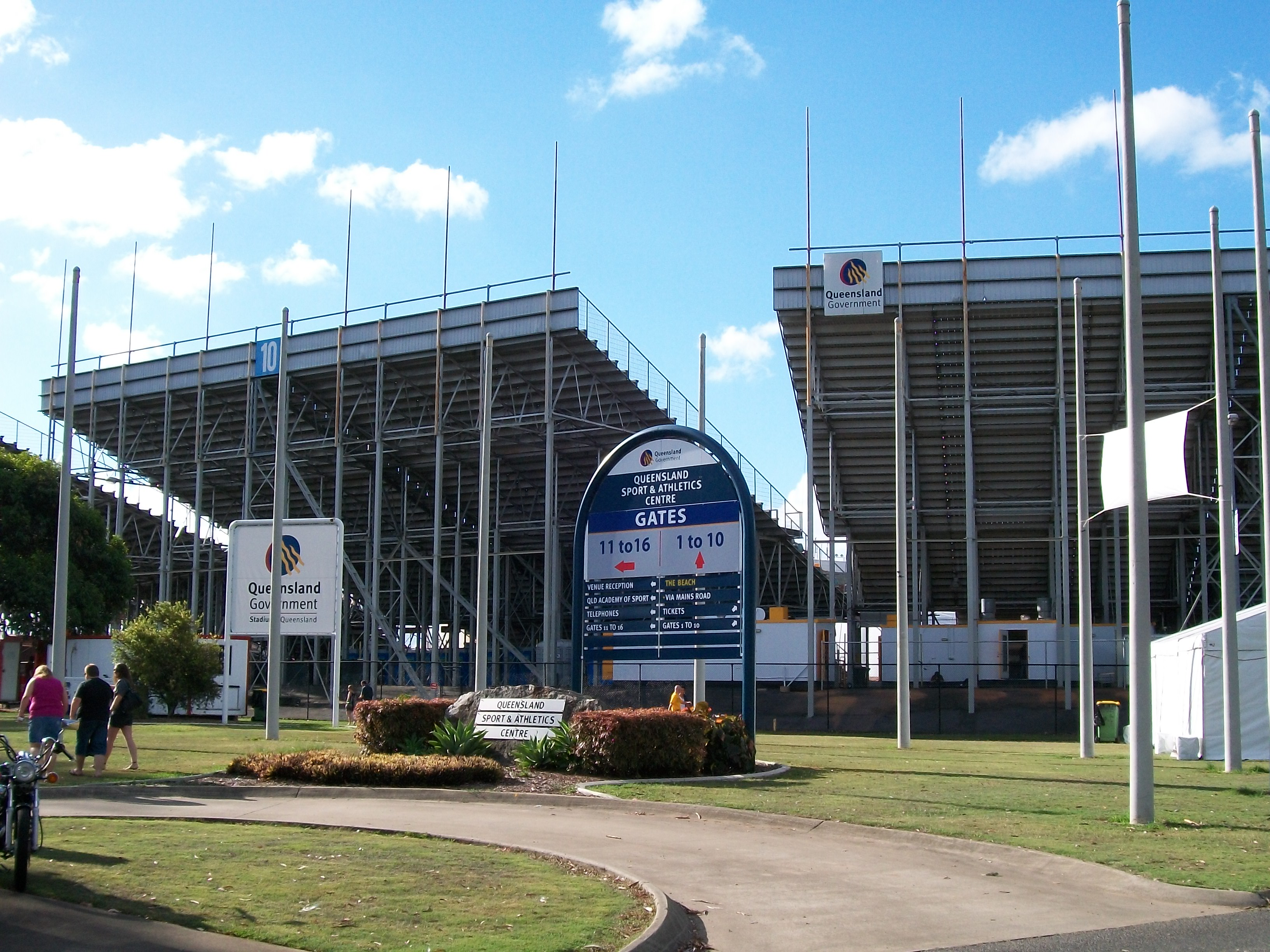
- Dates: 3–9 October 1982
- Host city: Brisbane, Australia
- Venue: QE II Stadium
- Level: Senior
- Events: 39
- Participation: 516 athletes from 39 nations
- Records set: 14 Games records

At the 1982 Commonwealth Games, the athletics events took place at the QE II Stadium in Brisbane, Australia from 3–9 October 1982. A total of 39 events were contested, 23 for men and 16 for women athletes.

== Medal summary ==
=== Men ===
Event	Gold		Silver		Bronze	
100 metres (wind: +5.9 m/s)	Allan Wells (SCO)	10.02	Ben Johnson (CAN)	10.05	Cameron Sharp (SCO)	10.07
200 metres (wind: +0.4 m/s)	Mike McFarlane (ENG); Allan Wells (SCO)	20.43	Not awarded		Cameron Sharp (SCO)	20.55
400 metres	Bert Cameron (JAM)	45.89	Rick Mitchell (AUS)	46.61	Gary Minihan (AUS)	46.68
800 metres	Peter Bourke (AUS)	1:45.18	James Maina Boi (KEN)	1:45.45	Chris McGeorge (ENG)	1:45.60
1500 metres	Steve Cram (ENG)	3:42.37	John Walker (NZL)	3:43.11	Mike Boit (KEN)	3:43.33
5000 metres	Dave Moorcroft (ENG)	13:33.00	Nick Rose (ENG)	13:35.97	Peter Koech (KEN)	13:36.95
10,000 metres	Gidamis Shahanga (TAN)	28:10.15	Zakariah Barie (TAN)	28:10:55	Julian Goater (ENG)	28:16.11
Marathon	Rob de Castella (AUS)	2:09:18	Juma Ikangaa (TAN)	2:09:30	Mike Gratton (ENG)	2:12:06
110 metres hurdles (wind: +1.9 m/s)	Mark McKoy (CAN)	13.37 GR	Mark Holtom (ENG)	13.43	Don Wright (AUS)	13.58
400 metres hurdles	Garry Brown (AUS)	49.37	Peter Rwamuhanda (UGA)	49.95	Greg Rolle (BAH)	50.50
3000 metres steeplechase	Julius Korir (KEN)	8:23.94	Graeme Fell (ENG)	8:26.64	Greg Duhaime (CAN)	8:29:14
4 × 100 metres relay	Nigeria; Lawrence Adegbehingbe; Iziaq Adeyanju; Samson Oyeledun; Ikpoto Eseme	39.15	Canada; Ben Johnson; Tony Sharpe; Desai Williams; Mark McKoy	39.30	Scotland; Gus McCuaig; Allan Wells; Cameron Sharp; Drew McMaster	39.33
4 × 400 metres relay	England; Steve Scutt; Garry Cook; Todd Bennett; Phil Brown	3:05.45	Australia; Gary Minihan; John Fleming; Greg Parker; Rick Mitchell	3:05.82	Kenya; Elisha Bitok; Juma Ndiwa; John Anzrah; James Maina Boi	3:06:33
30 kilometres walk	Steve Barry (WAL)	2:10:16	Marcel Jobin (CAN)	2:12:24	Guillaume Leblanc (CAN)	2:14:56
High jump	Milton Ottey (CAN)	2.31 m GR	Steve Wray (BAH)	2.31 m GR	Clarence Saunders (BER)	2.19 m
Pole vault	Ray Boyd (AUS)	5.20 m GR	Jeff Gutteridge (ENG)	5.20 m GR	Graham Eggleton (SCO)	5.20 m GR
Long jump	Gary Honey (AUS)	8.13 m GR	Steve Hanna (BAH)	7.79 m	Steve Walsh (NZL)	7.75 m
Triple jump	Keith Connor (ENG)	17.81 m (w)	Ken Lorraway (AUS)	17.54 m (w)	Aston Moore (ENG)	16.76 m
Shot put	Bruno Pauletto (CAN)	19.55 m	Mike Winch (ENG)	19.36 m	Luby Chambul (CAN)	17.46 m
Discus throw	Bradley Cooper (BAH)	64.04 m GR	Rob Gray (CAN)	60.66 m	Bishop Dolegiewicz (CAN)	60.34 m
Hammer throw	Robert Weir (ENG)	75.08 m GR	Martin Girvan (NIR)	73.62 m	Chris Black (SCO)	69.84 m
Javelin throw	Mike O'Rourke (NZL)	89.48 m GR	Laslo Babits (CAN)	84.88 m	Zakayo Malekwa (TAN)	80.22 m
Decathlon	Daley Thompson (ENG)	8410 pts	Dave Steen (CAN)	8004 pts	Fidelis Obikwu (ENG)	7726 pts

=== Women ===
Event	Gold		Silver		Bronze	
100 metres (wind: +1.4 m/s)	Angella Taylor (CAN)	11.00 GR	Merlene Ottey (JAM)	11.03	Coleen Pekin (AUS)	11.24
200 metres (wind: +2.5 m/s)	Merlene Ottey (JAM)	22.19 (w)	Kathy Smallwood (ENG)	22.21 (w)	Angella Taylor (CAN)	22.48 (w)
400 metres	Raelene Boyle (AUS)	51.26	Michelle Scutt (WAL)	51.97	Joslyn Hoyte-Smith (ENG)	52.53
800 metres	Kirsty McDermott (WAL)	2:01.31	Anne Clarkson (SCO)	2:01.52	Heather Barralet (AUS)	2:01.70
1500 metres	Christina Boxer (ENG)	4:08.28	Gillian Dainty (ENG)	4:10.80	Lorraine Moller (NZL)	4:12.67
3000 metres	Anne Audain (NZL)	8:45.53 GR	Wendy Smith (ENG)	8:48.47	Lorraine Moller (NZL)	8:55.76
100 metres hurdles (wind: +4.5 m/s)	Shirley Strong (ENG)	12.78	Lorna Boothe (ENG)	12.90	Sue Kameli (CAN)	13.10
400 metres hurdles	Debbie Flintoff (AUS)	55.89 GR	Ruth Kyalisima (UGA)	57.10	Yvette Wray (ENG)	57.17
4 × 100 metres relay	England; Wendy Hoyte; Kathy Smallwood; Beverley Callender; Sonia Lannaman	43.15 GR	Canada; Angela Bailey; Marita Payne; Angella Taylor; Molly Killingbeck	43.66	Jamaica; Lelieth Hodges; Merlene Ottey; Cathy Rattray; Grace Jackson	43.69
4 × 400 metres relay	Canada; Charmaine Crooks; Jillian Richardson; Molly Killingbeck; Angella Taylor	3:27.70	Australia; Leann Evans; Denise Boyd; Debbie Flintoff; Raelene Boyle	3:27.72	Scotland; Sandra Whittaker; Anne Clarkson; Angela Bridgeman; Linsey MacDonald	3:32.92
High jump	Debbie Brill (CAN)	1.88 m	Christine Stanton (AUS)	1.88 m	Barbara Simmonds (ENG)	1.83 m
Long jump	Shonel Ferguson (BAH)	6.91 m (w)	Robyn Strong (AUS)	6.88 m (w)	Beverly Kinch (ENG)	6.78 m
Shot put	Judy Oakes (ENG)	17.92 m GR	Gael Mulhall (AUS)	17.68 m	Rose Hauch (CAN)	16.71 m
Discus throw	Meg Ritchie (SCO)	62.98 m GR	Gael Mulhall (AUS)	58.64 m	Lynda Whiteley (ENG)	54.78 m
Javelin throw	Sue Howland (AUS)	64.46 m GR	Petra Rivers (AUS)	62.28 m	Fatima Whitbread (ENG)	58.86 m
Heptathlon	Glynis Nunn (AUS)	6282 pts	Judy Livermore (ENG)	6214 pts	Jill Ross-Giffen (CAN)	5981 pts

== Medal table ==
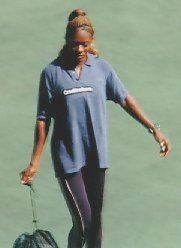
Merlene Ottey won gold, silver and relay bronze in the sprints for Jamaica.

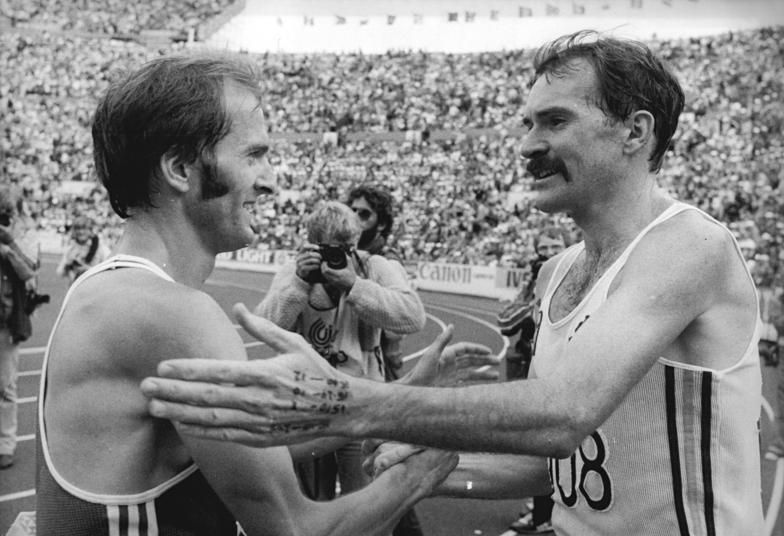
Home athlete Robert de Castella (on the right, pictured in 1983) won the marathon – his first major title.

* Host nation (Australia)

Rank	Nation	Gold	Silver	Bronze	Total
1	England (ENG)	11	10	11	32
2	Australia (AUS)*	9	9	4	22
3	Canada (CAN)	6	7	8	21
4	Scotland (SCO)	3	1	6	10
5	Bahamas (BAH)	2	2	1	5
6	New Zealand (NZL)	2	1	3	6
7	Jamaica (JAM)	2	1	1	4
8	Wales (WAL)	2	1	0	3
9	Tanzania (TAN)	1	2	1	4
10	Kenya (KEN)	1	1	3	5
11	Nigeria (NGR)	1	0	0	1
12	Uganda (UGA)	0	2	0	2
13	Northern Ireland (NIR)	0	1	0	1
14	Bermuda (BER)	0	0	1	1
Totals (14 entries)		40	38	39	117

== Participation ==
- Australia (70)
- Bahamas (6)
- Barbados (5)
- Bermuda (1)
- Botswana (6)
- Canada (57)
- Cayman Islands (2)
- Cyprus (7)
- England (82)
- Fiji (11)
- Gambia (8)
- Ghana (12)
- Gibraltar (1)
- Guernsey (1)
- Guyana (2)
- Hong Kong (4)
- India (3)
- Isle of Man (5)
- Jamaica (8)
- Kenya (42)
- Malawi (5)
- Mauritius (5)
- New Zealand (33)
- Nigeria (12)
- Northern Ireland (6)
- Papua New Guinea (6)
- Saint Helena (1)
- Scotland (27)
- Solomon Islands (5)
- Swaziland (3)
- Tanzania (7)
- Tonga (1)
- Trinidad and Tobago (7)
- Uganda (6)
- Vanuatu (4)
- Wales (21)
- Western Samoa (6)
- Zambia (9)
- Zimbabwe (19)

== See also ==
- 1982 in athletics (track and field)
