= 1983 World Championships in Athletics – Men's 1500 metres =

Men's 1500 metres at the 1983 World Championships
- Venue: Helsinki Olympic Stadium
- Dates: 12 August (heats); 13 August (semi-finals); 14 August (final)
- Competitors: 52
- Winning time: 3:41.59

Medalists
gold medal	Steve Cram	Great Britain
silver medal	Steve Scott	United States
bronze medal	Saïd Aouita	Morocco

These are the official results of the men's 1500 metres event at the 1983 IAAF World Championships in Helsinki, Finland. There were a total number of 52 participating athletes, with four qualifying heats, two semi-finals and the final held on Sunday 14 August 1983. The winning margin was 0.28 seconds.

== Records ==
Existing records at the start of the event.

World Record	Steve Ovett (GBR)	3:31.36	Koblenz, West Germany	August 27, 1980
Championship Record	New event			

== Results ==
=== Qualifying heats ===
The qualifying heats took place on 12 August, with the 52 athletes involved being split into 4 heats. The first 4 athletes in each heat ( Q ) and the next 8 fastest ( q ) qualified for the semifinals.

Heat 1

Rank	Name	Nationality	Time	Notes
1	Pierre Délèze	Switzerland	3:42.28	Q, CR
2	Sydney Maree	United States	3:43.13	Q
3	Uwe Becker	West Germany	3:43.18	Q
4	Ray Flynn	Ireland	3:43.27	Q
5	João Campos	Portugal	3:43.44	
6	Kipkoech Cheruiyot	Kenya	3:43.58	
7	Nikolay Kirov	Soviet Union	3:43.77	
8	Jan Persson	Sweden	3:43.83	
9	Dave Reid	Canada	3:45.08	
10	Mohamed Neji Henkiri	Tunisia	3:45.90	
11	Jama Aden	Somalia	3:46.87	
12	Tisbite Rakotoarisoa	Madagascar	3:52.91	
13	Luis Munguía	Nicaragua	4:02.06	

Heat 2

Rank	Name	Nationality	Time	Notes
1	Steve Cram	Great Britain & N.I.	3:40.17	Q, CR
2	Saïd Aouita	Morocco	3:40.39	Q
3	Frank O'Mara	Ireland	3:40.53	Q
4	John Walker	New Zealand	3:40.67	Q
5	Piotr Kurek	Poland	3:40.96	q
6	Niels Kim Hjorth	Denmark	3:41.29	q
7	Peter Wirz	Switzerland	3:41.69	
8	Philippe Dien	France	3:43.15	
9	Spyros Spyrou	Cyprus	3:43.94	
10	Paul Rugut	Kenya	3:46.00	
11	Jimmy Igohe	Tanzania	3:48.58	
12	Charlie Oliver	Solomon Islands	4:18.24	
	Mehdi Aidet	Algeria		DNS

Heat 3

Rank	Name	Nationality	Time	Notes
1	Andreas Busse	East Germany	3:38.65	Q, CR
2	Steve Ovett	Great Britain & N.I.	3:39.00	Q
3	Dragan Zdravković	Yugoslavia	3:39.18	Q
4	Jan Kubista	Czechoslovakia	3:39.20	Q
5	Tom Byers	United States	3:39.41	q
6	Eddy Stevens	Belgium	3:39.77	q
7	Stefano Mei	Italy	3:39.93	q
8	José Luis González	Spain	3:41.29	q
9	Pascal Thiebaut	France	3:41.51	
10	Amar Brahmia	Algeria	3:42.75	
11	Omer Khalifa	Sudan	3:48.23	
12	John Chappory	Gibraltar	3:56.92	
13	Jean-Marie Rudasinqwa	Rwanda	3:57.49	

Heat 4

Rank	Name	Nationality	Time	Notes
1	Steve Scott	United States	3:37.87	Q, CR
2	José Manuel Abascal	Spain	3:38.06	Q
3	Claudio Patrignani	Italy	3:38.35	Q
4	Graham Williamson	Great Britain & N.I.	3:38.99	Q
5	Abderrahmane Morceli	Algeria	3:39.77	q
6	Robert Nemeth	Austria	3:39.93	q
7	Mike Boit	Kenya	3:40.06	q
8	Antti Loikkanen	Finland	3:44.47	
9	Sermet Timurlenk	Turkey	3:46.74	
10	Mohammed Darwish	Iraq	3:50.04	
11	Ibrahim Malallah	Qatar	3:52.05	
12	Masini Situ-Kubanza	Zaire (ZAI)	4:06.44	
13	Sekou Camara	Guinea	4:08.46	

=== Semi-finals ===
The semifinals took place on 13 August, with the 25 athletes involved being split into 2 heats. The first 4 athletes in each heat ( Q ) and the next 4 fastest ( q ) qualified for the final.

Heat 1

Rank	Name	Nationality	Time	Notes
1	Steve Scott	United States	3:36.43	Q, CR
2	Saïd Aouita	Morocco	3:36.43	Q
3	Jan Kubista	Czechoslovakia	3:37.12	Q
4	Uwe Becker	West Germany	3:37.27	Q
5	Andreas Busse	East Germany	3:37.54	q
6	José Luis González	Spain	3:38.77	
7	Niels Kim Hjorth	Denmark	3:39.75	
8	Abderrahmane Morceli	Algeria	3:39.88	
9	Stefano Mei	Italy	3:41.78	
10	Graham Williamson	Great Britain & N.I.	3:45.84	
11	Frank O'Mara	Ireland	3:47.10	
	Robert Nemeth	Austria		DNF

Heat 2

Rank	Name	Nationality	Time	Notes
1	Steve Cram	Great Britain & N.I.	3:35.77	Q, CR
2	Steve Ovett	Great Britain & N.I.	3:36.26	Q
3	José Manuel Abascal	Spain	3:36.35	Q
4	Pierre Délèze	Switzerland	3:36.37	Q
5	John Walker	New Zealand	3:36.52	q
6	Dragan Zdravković	Yugoslavia	3:37.31	q
7	Mike Boit	Kenya	3:37.75	q
8	Claudio Patrignani	Italy	3:38.36	
9	Sydney Maree	United States	3:38.65	
10	Piotr Kurek	Poland	3:39.54	
11	Ray Flynn	Ireland	3:40.26	
12	Eddy Stevens	Belgium	3:42.63	
13	Tom Byers	United States	3:43.97	

=== Final ===
The final took place on August 14.

Rank	Name	Nationality	Time	Notes
1st place, gold medalist(s)	Steve Cram	Great Britain & N.I.	3:41.59	
2nd place, silver medalist(s)	Steve Scott	United States	3:41.87	
3rd place, bronze medalist(s)	Saïd Aouita	Morocco	3:42.02	
4	Steve Ovett	Great Britain & N.I.	3:42.34	
5	José Manuel Abascal	Spain	3:42.47	
6	Pierre Délèze	Switzerland	3:43.69	
7	Andreas Busse	East Germany	3:43.72	
8	Dragan Zdravković	Yugoslavia	3:43.75	
9	John Walker	New Zealand	3:44.24	
10	Jan Kubista	Czechoslovakia	3:44.30	
11	Uwe Becker	West Germany	3:45.09	
12	Mike Boit	Kenya	3:46.46	
