= Peter Bourke (footballer, born 1883) =

Australian rules footballer

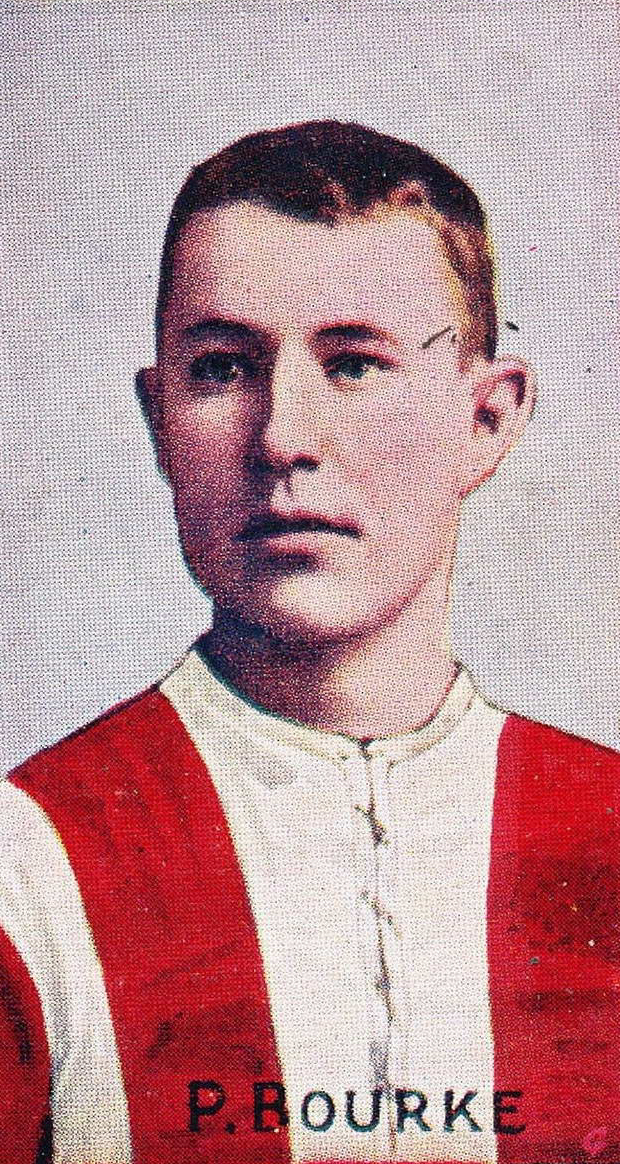
- Cigarette card of Bourke in 1908

Personal information
- Full name: Peter William Bourke
- Born: 28 June 1883; Sebastopol, Victoria
- Died: 18 March 1951 (aged 67); Daw Park, South Australia
- Original team: South Ballarat

Playing career^{1}
| Years | Club | Games (Goals) |
| 1906–07 | South Melbourne | 17 (8) |
- ^{1} Playing statistics correct to the end of 1907.

Peter Bourke (28 June 1883 – 18 March 1951) was an Australian rules footballer who played with South Melbourne in the Victorian Football League (VFL).
