= Juma Ndiwa =

Kenyan middle-distance runner

Personal information
- Born: 28 November 1960 (age 65)
- Height: 1.86 m (6 ft 1 in)
- Weight: 70 kg (150 lb)

Sport
- Sport: Athletics
- Event: 800 m
Medal record
Men's athletics
Representing Kenya
African Championships
Gold medal – first place	1982 Cairo	800 m
Gold medal – first place	1982 Cairo	4×400 m
Bronze medal – third place	1985 Cairo	800 m

Juma Ndiwa (born 28 November 1960) is a Kenyan former middle-distance runner specialising in the 800 metres. He represented his country at the 1984 and 1988 Summer Olympics as well as the 1983 World Championships. He won the gold at the 1982 African Championships and a bronze at the 1985 edition.

His personal best in the event is 1:44.20 set in Munich in 1983.

== International competitions ==
Year	Competition	Venue	Position	Event	Notes
Representing Kenya
1982	African Championships	Cairo, Egypt	1st	800 m	1:48.10
1982	Commonwealth Games	Brisbane, Australia	7th	800 m	1:47.74
1982	Commonwealth Games	Brisbane, Australia	3rd	4 × 400 m relay	3:06:33
1983	World Championships	Helsinki, Finland	29th (h)	800 m	1:48.40
1983	World Championships	Helsinki, Finland	7th (h)	4 × 400 m relay	3:07.48
1984	Olympic Games	Los Angeles, United States	14th (sf)	800 m	1:48.06
1985	African Championships	Cairo, Egypt	3rd	800 m	1:46.67
1988	Olympic Games	Seoul, South Korea	23rd (qf)	800 m	1:47.27
