= Rick Mitchell =

Australian triple Olympian (1955–2021)

Personal information
- Nationality: Australian
- Born: 24 March 1955 Sydney, Australia
- Died: 30 May 2021 (aged 66)

Sport
- Sport: Athletics (400m)
Medal record
Men's Athletics
Representing Australia
Olympic Games
Silver medal – second place	1980 Moscow	400 metres
Commonwealth Games
Gold medal – first place	1978 Edmonton	400 metres
Silver medal – second place	1982 Brisbane	400 metres
Silver medal – second place	1982 Brisbane	4×400 metres
Bronze medal – third place	1978 Edmonton	4×400 metres

Richard Charles Mitchell OAM (24 March 1955 – 30 May 2021) was an Australian sprinter and triple Olympian who competed in the 400 metres and 4 × 400 metres relay. Mitchell won a silver medal at the 1980 Summer Olympics, and also won one gold, two silver medals, and one bronze medal at the Commonwealth Games in 1978 and 1982.

== Early competition ==
Commencing in athletics at the relatively late age of seventeen, he joined the Waverley Athletics Club in Melbourne in 1972 with the aim of improving his fitness before the following rugby union season. After two seasons with Waverley, Mitchell met coach Norm Osborne, who coached at St Stephens Harriers. He transferred to St. Stephens and they would work as coach and athlete for the remainder of Mitchell's career.

At age nineteen Mitchell placed second in the Australian 400-metre title in 1974 when five days too old to contest the junior title in a time of 47.7s and things looked promising. However, he was to miss the next full offseason build-up following a bout of glandular fever and despite lowering his personal best to 46.8s at the end of the 1974–75 season, Mitchell placed second again to Steven Gee from New South Wales.

The following offseason in 1975 saw Mitchell complete his first dedicated build-up and he quickly emerged as the dominant Australian 400-metre runner during the following summer, defeating Gee for the first time in December 1975, before equalling the Australian record of 45.7s and claiming both the Victorian and Australian titles easily.

== Career ==
=== First Olympics ===
Mitchell was chosen in the Australian team for the 1976 Summer Olympics in Montreal, Quebec, Canada and in a competition notable for disappointing Australian performances, he reached the Olympic Final on his international debut, finishing 6th in an Australian record.

Two years later Mitchell competed in his first 1978 Commonwealth Games in Edmonton, Alberta, Canada where, in extremely windy conditions, and having to run four rounds of 400-metre races in 30 hours he proved too strong for his opponents, taking the individual 400-metre gold medal and anchoring the 4x400 metre relay team to third place.

=== Second Olympics ===
In 1979, Mitchell elected not to contest the World Cup, preferring to remain in Australia to build up for the 1980 Summer Olympics in Moscow in similar fashion to the preparation he followed in 1975. He again dominated the domestic season, lowering the national 400-metre record on four occasions as well as winning the Victorian 200 / 400-metre sprint double and again claiming the national title. In that race Mitchell lowered the national record to 45.35s in demolishing a field where the runner up ran 46.80.

Named as Australian team captain, Mitchell enjoyed good lead up form, winning at his first run after the national titles in Pisa, before defeating a strong, largely American field in Stuttgart and 1979 world 400 leader Harald Schmid of West Germany, in an Australian record time of 45.26. It was Mitchell's last competition prior to contesting the Olympics. In Moscow, he easily reached his second Olympic final.

The race itself was won by Russian Viktor Markin in a European record of 44.60s (the fastest time in the world for three seasons), while Mitchell finished strongly to take the silver medal in 44.84s. This time was the 12th fastest in history (full electronic timing) and was a Commonwealth record. Third placegetter, Frank Schaffer of East Germany, produced the fastest time ever for third outside of the altitude influenced Olympics conducted in Mexico City in 1968.

Mitchell's silver medal from Moscow remains the last individual men's running medal won at the Olympic Games by an Australian and the only track and field medal won by an Australian in an eastern bloc country. He then continued to race in Europe, where he frequently met American athletes who had not contested the Olympic Games following America's boycott of the meeting over the Soviet invasion of Afghanistan in 1979.

However, Mitchell defeated all of the prominent Americans during this time. He remained unbeaten against Billy Mullins with whom he shared the equal second-fastest time of the year and was ranked second for the year over 400 metres by Track and Field News ahead of all American athletes.

The following year, Mitchell accepted a position in England as the Area Manager - UK & Scandinavia for the Ansell Glove Company and athletics took a back seat. While in England, he competed for Haringey, and in 1982, moved to Lausanne, running for Stade Lausanne as part of late decision to defend his Commonwealth title at the 1982 Brisbane Commonwealth Games scheduled for October that year. During that time, he won the Lausanne Grand Prix meeting from old rival Harald Schmid and later ran a Swiss record (for Swiss registered athletes) of 45.49.

As well as being given the honour of carrying the Australian flag at the opening ceremony, Mitchell placed second behind Bert Cameron of Jamaica in the individual 400m final, and the Australian team also took silver behind England in the 4 × 400 m relay.

=== Final Olympics ===
Mitchell then elected to remain in Australia to prepare for one final attempt at the Olympics; however, his domestic season was disrupted by an achilles tendon injury which resulted in 7 weeks without running. To maintain fitness, he completed interval sessions running in a pool while wearing a life vest.

By this time Australia had developed great depth in the 400m, and a solo (but officially timed) 4 × 400 m run on a Sunday morning by Peter Van Miltenburg, Bruce Frayne, Gary Minihan, and Mitchell resulted in a new Australian record of 3:02.10. This time ensured that an Australian 4 × 400 m team would be going to the LA Games of 1984, where Mitchell was again named as Australian team captain.

Prior to leaving for the Games, Mitchell's achilles injury had mended and his time trials were faster than those produced before the 1980 Olympics where he won the silver medal. However, his achilles problem re-emerged shortly after the team arrived in the US and his training was again disrupted.

With Darren Clark also rapidly developing into a world class 400m runner, the Australian team looked strong and they ultimately reached the final. It is worth noting that Van Miltenburg, who did not run in the final, played a significant part in helping them team to reach it through the qualifying stages. Mitchell believed that with Clark finishing 4th in the individual men's final, and Frayne narrowly missing the final despite a brilliant semi-final run, it was imperative that they run the first two legs in order for Australia to be well in the race from the outset and he convinced the team coaches to adopt that approach.

The Australians led the US for almost 3 laps; however, with limited racing as a result of the achilles injury Mitchell was unable to hold out on the final leg as the USA took the gold medal in front of their home crowd, from Great Britain and Nigeria, who both closed late to edge the Australians out of the medals. This was the first time in athletics history that four teams had broken the 3-minute barrier in the same race and Australia placed 4th in a new national record of 2:59.70, which still stands in 2021. It is one second faster than the Australian team that finished second in the 4 × 400 m relay final at the 2004 Athens Olympic Games.

In 2012, Rick Mitchell was inducted into the Athletics Australia Hall of Fame.

Mitchell died from prostate cancer on 30 May 2021, aged 66.
