= Joseph Rodan =

Fijian sprinter (born 1951)

Personal information
- Born: 15 February 1951 (age 74) Suva, Colony of Fiji, British Empire

Sport
- Sport: Sprinting
- Event: 400 metres

Joseph Rodan (born 15 February 1951) is a Fijian sprinter. He competed in the 400 metres at the 1984 Summer Olympics and the 1988 Summer Olympics. His son, Joseph Rodan Jr., represented Fiji in athletics at the 1998 and 2002 Commonwealth Games.
