= Michael Franks (athlete) =

American sprinter

Personal information
- Born: September 23, 1963 (age 62) St. Louis, Missouri, United States

Sport
- Sport: Track and field
Medal record
Representing the United States
World Championships
| Silver medal – second place | 1983 Helsinki | 400 m |
World Indoor Championships
| Bronze medal – third place | 1987 Indianapolis | 400 m |
IAAF World Cup
| Gold medal – first place | 1985 Canberra | 400 m |
| Gold medal – first place | 1985 Canberra | 4 × 400 m relay |
Summer Universiade
| Gold medal – first place | 1987 Zagreb | 400 m |

Michael "Mike" Franks (born September 23, 1963) is an American former track and field athlete who competed in the 400-meter dash.

He was the silver medalist in the event at the inaugural 1983 World Championships in Athletics. He was given the Harrison Dillard Award in 1984 for his achievements. While attending Southern Illinois University Carbondale, he took the 400 m title at the 1985 NCAA Men's Indoor Track and Field Championship. That same year he took the gold medal at the 1985 IAAF Grand Prix Final and two further golds at the 1985 IAAF World Cup in the 400 m and 4 × 400-meter relay events. He was the fastest athlete of 1985 over 400 m with his personal best time of 44.47 seconds.

He competed at the 1987 IAAF World Indoor Championships and secured the bronze medal behind Antonio McKay and Roberto Hernández. Turning to the outdoor season, he won at the 1987 Summer Universiade, taking the 400 m students' title. He was selected as an alternate for the 4 × 400 m relay at the 1987 World Championships in Athletics and helped set a championship record of 2:59.06 in the semi-finals (which was later improved upon when the Americans took gold in the event final.
