= Tim Bethune =

Canadian sprinter (born 1962)

Personal information
- Full name: John Timothy Bethune
- Nationality: Canadian
- Born: 22 January 1962 (age 64) London, England

Sport
- Sport: Track and field
- Event: 400 metres

John Timothy Bethune (born 22 January 1962) is a retired Canadian sprinter. At the 1982 Commonwealth Games, he placed 7th in the 400m and 4th as a member of Canada's 4 × 400 metres relay. He was a member of Canada's 4 × 400 metres relay at the 1984 Summer Olympics, which placed 8th.

After he retired, Bethune admitted to using performance-enhancing drugs at the Dubin Inquiry in 1989. He was never found to have taken any performance-enhancing drugs while competing, and he was exonerated from any allegations that he competed while using any performance-enhancing drugs.
