= Charles Lupiya =

Zambian sprinter

Personal information
- Nationality: Zambian
- Born: 18 February 1953 (age 73)

Sport
- Sport: Sprinting
- Event: 400 metres

Charles Lupiya (born 18 May 1953) is a Zambian sprinter. He competed in the men's 400 metres at the 1980 Summer Olympics. He later served as a coach, including being a mentor to world champion Samuel Matete.
