= Bruce Frayne =

Australian sprinter (born 1958)

Personal information
- Born: 24 January 1958 (age 68)

Sport
- Country: Australia
- Sport: Track and field
- Events: 200 metres, 400 metres
- Coached by: Alastair Gordon; Neville Sillitoe

Achievements and titles
- Personal bests: 200 m: 20.59 (Canberra 1980); 400 m: 45.21 (Los Angeles 1984)
Medal record
Men's athletics
Representing Australia
Commonwealth Games
| Silver medal – second place | 1986 Edinburgh | 4 × 400 m relay |
Pacific Conference Games
| Gold medal – first place | 1981 Christchurch | 4 × 400 m relay |
| Silver medal – second place | 1981 Christchurch | 200 m |
| Silver medal – second place | 1981 Christchurch | 4 × 100 m relay |
Representing Oceania
IAAF World Cup
| Bronze medal – third place | 1985 Canberra | 4 × 400 m relay |

Bruce Frayne (born 24 January 1958) is an Australian former sprinter who competed in the 200 metres and 400 metres. A four-time Australian champion, he reached the 400 m semi-finals at the 1984 Summer Olympics and ran on the Australian 4 × 400 m team that finished fourth in a then Australian and Oceanian record of 2:59.70.

== Career ==
=== 1980–1982 ===
Frayne won his first Australian 200 metres title in Sydney in March 1980, running 21.20 seconds into a 3.6 m/s headwind. Later that year, he set a personal best of 20.59 seconds (−0.5 m/s) in Canberra on 21 December. Frayne retained the national title in Adelaide in 1981 with a time of 20.71 seconds (+0.2 m/s). At the Pacific Conference Games in Christchurch that year, he finished second in the 200 m and 4 × 100 m relay and won the 4 × 400 m relay.

After finishing second in the 200 m at the 1982 Australian Championships, Frayne competed at the 1982 Commonwealth Games in Brisbane. He progressed through four rounds of the 200 m before finishing fifth in the final in 20.72 seconds (+0.4 m/s), and was also part of the Australian 4 × 100 m relay team that placed fourth. Frayne won his first two national 200 m titles under South Australian coach Alastair Gordon and later trained under Neville Sillitoe.

=== 1983–1984 ===
In 1983, Frayne won his third Australian 200 m title, clocking 20.87 seconds in still conditions in Melbourne. At the inaugural World Championships in Helsinki that August, he advanced through the heats and quarter-finals of the 200 m before finishing seventh in his semi-final in 20.94 seconds (+1.4 m/s).

In 1984, Frayne won the Australian 400 m championship in 45.96 seconds after running 45.95 in his heat. At the Los Angeles Olympics, he won his opening 400 m heat in 46.08 seconds and ran 45.35 in the quarter-finals before recording a personal best of 45.21 in the semi-finals, where he finished fifth and missed the final by one place. In the 4 × 400 m final, Frayne led off an Australian team also comprising Darren Clark, Gary Minihan and Rick Mitchell. The quartet finished fourth in 2:59.70, setting Australian and Oceanian records.

=== 1985–1986 ===
At the 1985 IAAF World Cup in Canberra, Frayne represented Oceania in the 4 × 400 m relay, combining with Minihan, Alan Ozolins and Clark to finish third in 3:01.35. He remained among Australia's leading 400 m runners the following season, placing fourth at the 1986 Australian Championships in 46.39 seconds. At the 1986 Commonwealth Games in Edinburgh, Frayne reached the 400 m final, finishing seventh, before winning silver in the 4 × 400 m relay as Australia recorded 3:07.81.

Frayne's Olympic personal best of 45.21 also stood as the South Australian 400 m record for more than 41 years, until Aidan Murphy ran 45.12 seconds in Adelaide in January 2026.

== Later involvement in athletics ==
Frayne later remained involved in Australian athletics as a mentor to developing athletes. He worked with Athletics Australia's National Under-19 Talent Squad during 2008–09 and was one of four mentors who led the federation's National 21's Squad programme the following year.

== Personal bests ==
| Event | Mark | Wind (m/s) | Location | Date | Notes |
|---|---|---|---|---|---|
| 100 metres | 10.45 | (+1.7 m/s) | London, United Kingdom | 9 June 1982 | |
| 200 metres | 20.59 | (−0.5 m/s) | Canberra, Australia | 21 December 1980 | Former South Australian record |
| 400 metres | 45.21 | —N/a | Los Angeles, United States | 6 August 1984 | Former South Australian record |
| 4 × 400 m | 2:59.70 | —N/a | Los Angeles, United States | 11 August 1984 | Former NR, AR |
