= Peter Bourke (runner) =

Australian middle-distance runner

Peter Bourke (born 23 April 1958) is an Australian former middle-distance runner.

He is best known for winning the 800 metres at the 1982 Commonwealth Games in Brisbane.
