= Sunder Nix =

American sprinter (born 1961)

Personal information
- Full name: Sunder Lamont Nix
- Born: December 2, 1961 (age 64) Birmingham, Alabama, U.S.

Sport
- Sport: Running
- Event: 400 meters

Achievements and titles
- Personal best: 400 m: 44.68
Medal record
Men's athletics
Representing the United States
Olympic Games
Gold medal – first place	1984 Los Angeles	4 × 400 m relay
World Championships
Bronze medal – third place	1983 Helsinki	400 m
Summer Universiade
Gold medal – first place	1983 Edmonton	4 x 400 m relay
Bronze medal – third place	1983 Edmonton	400 m

Sunder Lamont Nix (born December 2, 1961, in Birmingham, Alabama) is an American former track and field athlete and He was an Olympic gold medalist at the 1984 Summer Olympics in the men's 4 × 400 m relay for the United States.

As the world's best in the 400-meter race in 1982, Sunder Nix set a personal best of 44.68 seconds, improving his previous best by almost a second. In 1983, he narrowly qualified for the final at the first World Championships . In the final, he was far behind entering the home stretch, but he managed to pull away and win the bronze medal in 45.24 seconds. In the final of the 4 x 400-meter relay, Sunder Nix handed over to Willie Smith as the second runner, who then fell, so the relay team "only" finished sixth.

In 2013 competed at the Masters National Outdoor Track & Field Championship.

Nix was an NCAA champion for the Indiana Hoosiers track and field team in 1983.
