= Doug Hinds (athlete) =

Canadian sprinter (born 1958)

Personal information
- Full name: Douglas Hinds
- Born: 15 April 1958 (age 68) Toronto, Ontario, Canada

Sport
- Country: Canada
- Sport: Sprint
- Events: 400 m, 4 × 400 m relay

Douglas Hinds (born 15 April 1958) is a Canadian retired sprinter who competed at the 1984 Summer Olympics in the 400 metres and 4 × 400 metres relay.

Hinds attended Lamar University, where he was a member of the track team.

Hinds was part of the 1980 Olympic team for Canada, but did not compete due to the 1980 Summer Olympics boycott. At the 1984 Olympics in Los Angeles, he competed in the 400 metres finishing 24th. He also was a member of the 4 × 400 m relay team (with Michael Sokolowski, Brian Saunders, and Tim Bethune) which set a Canadian record of 3:04.47 in their first heat, and finishing eighth overall, with Hinds running his leg of the relay in 45.04 seconds.

Hinds' brothers Sterling and Jerry were also members of the Canadian track team.
