= Darren Clark =

Australian 400 metres sprinter (born 1965)

Personal information
- Born: 6 September 1965 (age 61) Sydney, New South Wales, Australia

Sport
- Country: Australia
- Sport: Track and field
- Event: 400 metres
- Coached by: Alan Hawes; Mike Hurst

Achievements and titles
- Personal bests: 200 m: 20.49 (Sydney 1983); 300 m: 31.88 (Belfast 1986); 400 m: 44.38 NR, AR (Seoul 1988)
Medal record
Men's athletics
Representing Australia
Commonwealth Games
Gold medal – first place	1990 Auckland	400 m
Silver medal – second place	1986 Edinburgh	400 m
Silver medal – second place	1986 Edinburgh	4 × 400 m relay
World Indoor Championships
Bronze medal – third place	1993 Toronto	400 m
Representing Oceania
IAAF World Cup
Bronze medal – third place	1985 Canberra	200 m
Bronze medal – third place	1985 Canberra	4 × 400 m relay

Darren Clark (born 6 September 1965) is an Australian former sprinter who specialised in the 400 metres. He holds the Australian and Oceanian record of 44.38 seconds, won the 400 m at the 1990 Commonwealth Games and finished fourth in the event at both the 1984 and 1988 Summer Olympics.

== Career ==
=== 1983–1986 ===
Born in Sydney, Clark won the 100 metres, 200 metres and 400 metres at the Australian Junior Championships in 1983. At 17, he represented Australia at the inaugural World Championships in Helsinki, running 45.84 seconds in the quarter-finals before finishing seventh in his 400 m semi-final. That year he also won the first of four consecutive 400 m titles at the British AAA Championships, a sequence that continued through 1986.

At the 1984 Los Angeles Olympics, Clark ran a personal best of 44.77 seconds in the quarter-finals before lowering it to 44.75 in the 400 m final, where he finished fourth. That performance remains the Australian under-20 400 m record. Clark also ran the second leg of Australia's 4 × 400 m relay final, recording a 43.86-second split as Bruce Frayne, Clark, Gary Minihan and Rick Mitchell finished fourth in an Australian record of 2:59.70.

Clark won his third successive AAA 400 m title in 1985 before representing Oceania at the 1985 IAAF World Cup in Canberra, where he finished third in the 200 m, fourth in the 400 m and anchored the 4 × 400 m relay team to third place. The following year, he won his first senior Australian 400 m title in 45.69 seconds and completed his run of four consecutive AAA titles. At the 1986 Commonwealth Games in Edinburgh, Clark won silver in the 400 m behind Roger Black and added a second silver medal in the 4 × 400 m relay.

=== 1987–1990 ===
Clark reached the 400 m semi-finals at the 1987 World Championships in Rome, finishing eighth in his semi-final in 45.93 seconds. Having previously trained under Alan Hawes, he began working with Mike Hurst in January 1988 as he prepared for his second Olympic Games.

At the Seoul Olympics, Clark won his opening 400 m heat before running 44.96 seconds in the quarter-finals. In the semi-finals, he improved to 44.38 seconds, setting Australian and Oceanian records. Clark again finished fourth in the Olympic final, running 44.55 seconds behind the three American medallists, and later anchored Australia to sixth in the 4 × 400 m relay. His 44.38 remains the Australian and Oceanian 400 m record.

In 1989, Clark completed a sprint double at the Australian Championships in Brisbane, winning the 200 m in 21.27 seconds into a strong headwind and the 400 m in 46.00 seconds. He retained the Australian 400 m title the following year in 45.04 seconds before competing at the 1990 Commonwealth Games in Auckland. Clark won each round of the 400 m and took gold in the final in a Games-record 44.60 seconds. He also competed in the 200 m, reaching the semi-finals.

=== 1991–1994 ===
Clark stepped away from athletics in 1991 to play rugby league with the Balmain Tigers, playing mainly as a winger in reserve grade. He returned to athletics and was selected for Australia's team for the 1992 Summer Olympics in Barcelona, but withdrew before the Games because of an Achilles tendon injury.

In 1993, Clark won his fourth Australian senior 400 m title in 45.65 seconds. At the World Indoor Championships in Toronto, he won bronze in the 400 m in 46.45 seconds, setting an Oceanian record at the time. Clark competed for a final season in 1994, ending his career after finishing second to Dean Capobianco at the Sydney Grand Prix, with Capobianco winning 45.47 to 45.49 seconds.

== Coaching career ==
After retiring from competition, Clark moved into coaching. During 2001–02, he was one of two former Olympians employed as scholarship coaches at the Australian Institute of Sport. He later coached Australian hurdler and former heptathlete Celeste Mucci, whom he first identified at a primary-school athletics carnival and coached through her progression to senior international competition and the 2024 Summer Olympics.

Clark was inducted into the Sport Australia Hall of Fame in 2000 and the Australian Athletics Hall of Fame in 2014.

== Personal bests ==
Event	Mark	Wind (m/s)	Location	Date	Notes
200 metres	20.49	(±0.0 m/s)	Sydney, Australia	12 November 1983	
300 metres	31.88	—N/a	Belfast, United Kingdom	30 June 1986	
400 metres	44.38	—N/a	Seoul, South Korea	26 September 1988	NR, AR
400 m short track	46.45	—N/a	Toronto, Canada	14 March 1993	
4 × 400 m	2:59.70	—N/a	Los Angeles, United States	11 August 1984	Former NR, AR
