= James Atuti =

Kenyan sprinter

Personal information
- Nationality: Kenyan
- Born: 19 March 1954
- Died: 4 September 2000 (aged 46)

Sport
- Sport: Sprinting
- Event: 400 metres
Medal record
Men's athletics
Representing Kenya
African Championships
Gold medal – first place	1979 Dakar	4×400 m
Gold medal – first place	1982 Cairo	4×400 m
Silver medal – second place	1979 Dakar	400 m
Silver medal – second place	1982 Cairo	400 m
Bronze medal – third place	1982 Cairo	4×100 m

James Atuti (19 March 1954 – 4 September 2000) was a Kenyan sprinter. He competed in the men's 400 metres at the 1984 Summer Olympics.
