= James Maina Boi =

Kenyan middle-distance runner

Personal information
- Nationality: Kenyan
- Born: 4 April 1954
- Died: 15 July 2004 (aged 50)

Sport
- Sport: Athletics
- Event: middle-distance
Medal record
Men's athletics
Representing Kenya
African Championships
Gold medal – first place	1979 Dakar	800 m
Gold medal – first place	1982 Cairo	4×400 m
Silver medal – second place	1982 Cairo	800 m
Bronze medal – third place	1984 Rabat	4×400 m
Commonwealth Games
Silver medal – second place	1982 Brisbane	800m

James Maina Boi (4 April 1954 – 15 July 2004) was a Kenyan middle-distance runner. He is best known for winning the 800 metres distance at the 1978 All-Africa Games and a silver medal at the 1982 Commonwealth Games.

He also competed in the 4 x 400 metres relay at the 1983 World Championships with the Kenyan team that was eliminated in the semi-finals. He finished second behind Omer Khalifa in the 800 metres event at the British 1980 AAA Championships.

Boi died in 2004 following long-term illness.

== Achievements ==
Year	Competition	Venue	Position	Event	Notes
Representing Kenya
1978	All-Africa Games	Algiers, Algeria	1st	800m	
1979	World Cup	Montreal, Canada	1st	800m	
1979	African Championships	Dakar, Senegal	1st	800m	
1982	Commonwealth Games	Brisbane, Australia	2nd	800m	
1982	African Championships	Cairo, Egypt	2nd	800m	

Boi also won two gold medals at the East African Championships in 1977 and 1979.
