= John Anzrah =

Kenyan sprinter (born 1954)

Personal information
- Nationality: Kenyan
- Born: 27 October 1954 (age 71)

Sport
- Sport: Sprinting
- Event: 400 metres
Medal record
Men's athletics
Representing Kenya
African Championships
| Bronze medal – third place | 1982 Cairo | 4×100 m |

John Anzrah (born 27 October 1954) is a Kenyan former sprinter. He competed in the men's 400 metres event at the 1984 Summer Olympics.
