= Gary Minihan =

Australian sprinter

Gary Minihan (born 24 January 1962) is an Australian retired sprinter who specialized in the 400 metres.

At the 1982 Commonwealth Games he won a bronze medal in 400 metres and a silver medal in 4 × 400 metres relay.

He finished fourth with the Australian relay team at the 1984 Summer Olympics. The team, consisting of Bruce Frayne, Darren Clark, Gary Minihan and Rick Mitchell, ran in a new Oceanian record time of 2:59.70 minutes. The record still stood in 2006.

He is the son of former St Kilda player Graham "Snowy" Minihan.
