= Garry Cook (runner) =

British athlete (born 1958)

Personal information
- Nationality: British (English)
- Born: 10 January 1958 (age 68) Wednesbury, England
- Height: 185 cm (6 ft 1 in)
- Weight: 72 kg (159 lb)

Sport
- Sport: Athletics
- Event: 400m
- Club: WBAC
Medal record
Men's athletics
Representing Great Britain
Olympic Games
Silver medal – second place	1984 Los Angeles	4×400 m
World Championships
Bronze medal – third place	1983 Helsinki	4×400 m
European Championships
Silver medal – second place	1982 Athens	4×400 m
Summer Universiade
Silver medal – second place	1979 Mexico City	800 m
Representing England
Commonwealth Games
Gold medal – first place	1982 Brisbane	4×400 m

Garry Peter Cook (born 10 January 1958) is a former British track and field athlete, who competed mainly in the 800 metres with a best time of 1:44.55 minutes. He competed at the 1984 Summer Olympics.

== Biography ==
Cook represented England in the 800 metres event, at the 1978 Commonwealth Games in Edmonton, Canada. Cook finished third behind Steve Scott and John Walker in the 800 metres event at the 1979 AAA Championships but by virtue of being the highest placed British athlete was considered the British 800 metres champion

The same happened at the 1981 AAA Championships over 400 metres when Cook was third behind Americans Tony Darden and Walter McCoy. The following year he represented England and won a gold medal in the 4 x 400 metres relay, at the 1982 Commonwealth Games in Brisbane, Australia; he also competed in the 800 metres event.

Cook was a world record holder in the rarely run 4×800 m relay as a part of a quartet that also contained Peter Elliott, Steve Cram and Sebastian Coe. They ran a time of 7 minutes 3.89 seconds on 30 August 1982 at Crystal Palace.

He competed for Great Britain in the 1984 Olympics held in Los Angeles, in the 4 x 400 metre relay, where he won the silver medal with his teammates Kriss Akabusi, Todd Bennett and Philip Brown.

After a successful athletics career, Cook qualified and practiced as a teacher specialising in Physical Education and Geography at Bluecoat school Walsall. He is married to former fellow Olympian Kathy Cook; they have three children, Sarah (1988), Matthew (1989) and George (1992) and reside in Walsall, England.
