= Joseph Ramotshabi =

Motswana sprinter (born 1962)

Personal information
- Nationality: Botswana
- Born: 1 June 1962 (age 64)

Sport
- Sport: Track and field
- Event: 400 metres

Joseph Ramotshabi (born 1 June 1962) is a Botswana sprinter. He competed in the 400 metres at the 1980 Summer Olympics and the 1984 Summer Olympics.
