= Todd Bennett =

British sprinter (1962–2013)

Personal information
- Nationality: British (English)
- Born: 6 July 1962 Southampton, England
- Died: 16 July 2013 (aged 51) Southampton, England

Sport
- Sport: Athletics
- Event: Sprints / 400m
- Club: Southampton & Eastleigh A.A.C./Team Solent
Medal record
Men's athletics
Representing United Kingdom
Olympic Games
Silver medal – second place	1984 Los Angeles	4×400 m
World Championships
Bronze medal – third place	1983 Helsinki	4×400 m
European Championships
Silver medal – second place	1982 Athens	4×400 m
Representing England
Commonwealth Games
Gold medal – first place	1982 Brisbane	4×400 m
Gold medal – first place	1986 Edinburgh	4×400 m
Silver medal – second place	1986 Edinburgh	200 m

Todd Anthony Bennett (6 July 1962 – 16 July 2013) was a British athlete who competed mainly in the 400 metres. He competed at the 1984 Summer Olympics and the 1988 Summer Olympics.

== Biography ==
Bennett competed for Great Britain in the 1984 Summer Olympics held in Los Angeles, United States, in the 4 × 400 metre relay where he won the silver medal with his teammates Kriss Akabusi, Garry Cook and Philip Brown.

Bennett's international career started in 1981 where he took the 400 m title at the European Junior Championships as well as forming one quarter of the silver medal-winning 4 × 400 m squad. His success at these championships marked the start of a decade at the top of his sport in which he attended all major championships both indoor and outdoor. Perfectly proportioned for running indoors, Bennett was European Indoor Champion over 400 m in both 1985 and 1987 and also took a silver medal over 400 m at the World Indoor Championships in 1985. This was the same year that he also became World Indoor Record Holder for the 400 m in 45.56 seconds.

During his career Bennett competed in three Commonwealth Games Championships. At the 1982 Commonwealth Games in Brisbane, Australia, he competed for England over 400 m where he was placed 5th and was a member of the gold medal-winning 4 × 400 m squad. Four years later he represented England at the 1986 Commonwealth Games in Edinburgh, Scotland, where he was second in the 200 metres. In his final Commonwealth Games in 1990 in Auckland, New Zealand, he finished 8th in the 400 metres.

Throughout his career, Bennett was a central member of the Great Britain 4 × 400 m squad. As a member of this squad, he attended two Olympic Games in 1984 (2nd) and 1988 (5th) and two World Championships in 1983 (3rd) and 1987 (2nd). He also attended four Europa Cup competitions as part of this squad and in his four appearances obtained three gold medals.

== Coaching ==
After retirement from competition, Bennett maintained his links with athletics. He worked with the Great Britain Junior Athletics Team and for four years was their Team Manager. From 2003 Bennett worked as the National 400 m event coach for the Senior women and was in Athens, Greece when the team came 4th, running the fastest time by a British team for ten years. During this period Bennett also coached his own group of athletes, several gaining international honours.

Bennett died from cancer on 16 July 2013.
