= Phil Brown (sprinter) =

British sprinter (born 1962)

Personal information
- Nationality: British (English)
- Born: 6 January 1962 (age 64) Birmingham, England
- Height: 180 cm (5 ft 11 in)
- Weight: 73 kg (161 lb)

Sport
- Sport: Athletics
- Event: Sprints/400m
- Club: Birchfield Harriers
Medal record
Men's athletics
Representing Great Britain
Olympic Games
Silver medal – second place	1984 Los Angeles	4x400 m
World Championships
Silver medal – second place	1987 Rome	4×400 m
Bronze medal – third place	1983 Helsinki	4×400 m
European Championships
Silver medal – second place	1982 Athens	4×400 m
Representing England
Commonwealth Games
Gold medal – first place	1982 Brisbane	4×400 m
Gold medal – first place	1986 Edinburgh	4×400 m
Bronze medal – third place	1986 Edinburgh	400 m

Philip Andrew Brown (born 6 January 1962) is a British retired athlete who competed mainly in the 400 metres and participated in the 1984 Summer Olympics and the 1988 Summer Olympics.

== Biography ==
Brown was a member of Birchfield Harriers and an exceptional anchor leg relay runner, anchoring the British team to a number of medals. Brown's career highlight came when he competed for Great Britain in the 1984 Olympics Games held in Los Angeles, United States in the 4 x 400 metre relay, where, in a dramatic final 100 m, he overtook Rick Mitchell of Australia and then Innocent Egbunike of Nigeria to claim the silver medal for Great Britain with his teammates Kriss Akabusi, Garry Cook and Todd Bennett. Brown's final leg time of 44.3 seconds resulted in a time of 2:59.13 which was a British and European record at the time and the first time a British team had bettered 3 minutes for the event.

The European Championships in 1982 saw the team, once again anchored by Brown, win the silver medal behind the West German team, in 3:00.68. At the Rome World Championships of 1987, he ran another excellent final leg in 44.3, which earned the team a silver medal in a European record time of 2:58.86.

He won an individual bronze medal and two team gold medals at the Commonwealth Games. He represented England and won a gold medal in the 4 x 400 metres event and finished sixth in the 400 metres, at the 1982 Commonwealth Games in Brisbane, Australia. Four years later he represented England and won another gold medal in the 4 x 400 metres event, at the 1986 Commonwealth Games in Edinburgh, Scotland. He also earned an individual bronze at the Games in the 400 metres. A third and final Commonwealth appearance for England came at the 1990 Commonwealth Games in Auckland, New Zealand, where he competed in the 400 metres.

Brown became the British 400 metres champion after winning the British AAA Championships title at the 1989 AAA Championships.

== Personal life ==
Phil is now a conference speaker and was previously the Regional Director for The Duke of Edinburgh's Award in the Midlands. After this he became a student mentor at Hilton Spencer Academy.
