= List of flag bearers for Madagascar at the Olympics =

Madagascar at the Olympics
- IOC code: MAD
- NOC: Comité Olympique Malgache
- Medals: Gold 0 Silver 0 Bronze 0 Total 0

Summer appearances
- 1964; 1968; 1972; 1976; 1980; 1984; 1988; 1992; 1996; 2000; 2004; 2008; 2012; 2016; 2020; 2024

Winter appearances
- 2006; 2010–2014; 2018; 2022; 2026; 2030

This is a list of flag bearers who have represented Madagascar at the Olympics.

Flag bearers carry the national flag of their country at the opening ceremony of the Olympic Games.

#	Event year	Season	Flag bearer	Sport
1	1972	Summer	Jean-Aimé Randrianalijaona	Athletics
2	1984	Summer	Jean-Luc Bezoky	Boxing
3	1996	Summer	Dally Randriantefy	Tennis
4	2000	Summer	Joseph-Berlioz Randriamihaja	Athletics
5	2004	Summer	Rosa Rakotozafy	Athletics
6	2006	Winter	Mathieu Razanakolona	Alpine Skiing
7	2008	Summer	Jean de Dieu Soloniaina	Boxing
8	2012	Summer	Fetra Ratsimiziva	Judo
9	2016	Summer	Eliane Saholinirina	Athletics
10	2018	Winter	Mialitiana Clerc	Alpine Skiing
11	2020	Summer	Éric Andriantsitohaina	Weightlifting
11	2020	Summer	Damiella Nomenjanahary	Judo
12	2022	Winter	Mialitiana Clerc	Alpine skiing
12	2022	Winter	Mathieu Neumuller	Alpine skiing
13	2024	Summer	Fabio Rakotoarimanana	Table tennis
13	2024	Summer	Rosina Randafiarison	Weightlifting

== See also ==
- Madagascar at the Olympics
