= List of Malagasy records in athletics =

The following are the national records in athletics in Madagascar maintained by Malagasy national athletics federation: Federation Malagasy d'Athletisme.

== Outdoor ==
Key to tables: Awaiting ratification Record not kept by Federation Malagasy d'Athletisme Not ratified or later rescinded by Federation Malagasy d'Athletisme

=== Men ===
Event	Record	Athlete	Date	Meet	Place	Ref.
100 m	10.18 A (+2.0 m/s)	Jean-Louis Ravelomanantsoa	13 October 1968	Olympic Games	Mexico City, Mexico	
200 m	20.85 (±0.0 m/s)	Hubert Rakotombélontsoa	28 September 1996		Antananarivo, Madagascar	
200 m	20.6 h	Jean-Louis Ravelomanantsoa	20 May 1972		San Diego, United States	
400 m	46.80	Todiasoa Rabearison	1 October 2019	World Championships	Doha, Qatar	
800 m	1:47.33	Joseph Rakotoarimanana	28 July 1996	Olympic Games	Atlanta, United States	
1500 m	3:44.80	Edouard Rasoanaivo	13 January 1973	All-Africa Games	Lagos, Nigeria	
3000 m	8:22.6	Fulgence Rakotondrasoa	6 May 2011		Antananarivo, Madagascar	
5000 m	14:07.50	Fulgence Rakotondrasoa	17 June 2006		Rabat, Morocco	
10,000 m	28:42.00	Jules Randrianarivelo	21 July 1979		Moscow, Soviet Union	
Marathon	2:17:14	Jules Randrianarivelo	29 July 1979		Moscow, Soviet Union	
110 m hurdles	13.46 (+1.5 m/s)	Joseph-Berlioz Randriamihaja	24 August 2004	Olympic Games	Athens, Greece	
400 m hurdles	49.53	Yvon Rakotoarimiandry	23 July 2001	Jeux de la Francophonie	Ottawa, Canada	
3000 m steeplechase	8:50.8	Augustin Ravaolahy	11 August 1998		Saint-Paul, Réunion, France	
High jump	2.14 m	Riri Josveh Tonganirina	15 August 2007	Indian Ocean Games	Antananarivo, Madagascar	
Pole vault	4.60 m	Florian Henry	7 July 2004		Aulnay-sous-Bois, France	
Long jump	7.77 m	Toussaint Rabenala	19 May 1990		Talence, France	
Triple jump	17.05 m (+1.0 m/s)	Toussaint Rabenala	10 June 1989		Sotteville, France	
Shot put	14.20 m	Ignace Alssabano Djohostone	22 June 2007		Antananarivo, Madagascar	
Discus throw	42.24 m	Francklin Lahossa	14 August 1993		Antananarivo, Madagascar	
Hammer throw	39.67 m	Germain Bétia Radera	7 August 1999	Malagasy Championships	Antananarivo, Madagascar	
Javelin throw	69.92 m	Fidèle Rakotonirina	10 June 1990		Mahitsy, Madagascar	
Decathlon	7685 pts	Ali Kamé	16–17 April 2011	Reduit CAA Silver Meet	Réduit, Mauritius	
Decathlon	100m / Long jump / Shot put / High jump / 400m / 110m H / Discus / Pole vault / Javelin / 1500m; 11.03 / 7.33 m / 13.65 m / 2.02 m / 50.00 / 15.20 / 36.66 m / 4.40 m / 58.78 m / 4:33.60					
10,000 m walk (track)	50:26.33	Harivola Rakotonirina	10 August 2011	Indian Ocean Island Games	Victoria, Seychelles	
20 km walk (road)	1:34:33	Piétron Randrianandrasana	13 August 2006		Flic-en-Flac, Mauritius	
50 km walk (road)	6:11:14	Flaviano Rakotonirina	18 April 2010		Saint-Denis, Réunion	
4 × 100 m relay	40.49	Madagascar; Andry Randrianarison; Prosper Zafimahakoko; Hervé Rakotoarimanana; Davy Sinosoke	16 August 2007	Indian Ocean Games	Antananarivo, Madagascar	
4 × 400 m relay	3:08.0	Madagascar; Yvon Rakotoarimiandry; Hubert Rakotombelontsoa; Jean-Jacky Randriamamitiana; Jean-Marie Zafiteny	5 September 1997	Jeux de la Francophonie	Antananarivo, Madagascar	

=== Women ===
Event	Record	Athlete	Date	Meet	Place	Ref.
100 m	11.32 (+1.9 m/s)	Lalao Ravaonirina	6 July 1991		Limoges, France	
100 m	11.32 (+1.2 m/s)	Hanitriniaina Rakotondrabe	26 May 1996		Dijon, France	
200 m	23.09 (−1.1 m/s)	Rosa Rakotozafy	10 April 1999		Pretoria, South Africa	
400 m	52.05	Ony Paule Ratsimbazafy	19 July 1998	Meeting Areva	Paris, France	
800 m	2:02.87	Fanjanteino Félix	10 July 2008		Albertville, France	
1500 m	4:15.13	Marie-Éliane Saholinirina	28 May 2016	IFAM	Oordegem, Belgium	
3000 m	9:34.07	Martine Rasoarimalala	27 June 1993	African Championships	Durban, South Africa	
5000 m	16:20.30	Clarisse Rasoarizay	13 August 1998	Indian Ocean Island Games	Saint-Paul, Réunion	
10,000 m	33:52.25	Clarisse Rasoarizay	11 August 1998	Indian Ocean Island Games	Saint-Paul, Réunion	
10,000 m	33:00.44 Mx	Clarisse Rasoarizay	25 July 2003		Antananarivo, Madagascar	
Half marathon	1:15:43	Clarisse Rasoarizay	27 September 1998	World Half Marathon Championships	Zurich, Switzerland	
Marathon	2:38:21	Clarisse Rasoarizay	6 September 2003		Bambous, Mauritius	
100 m hurdles	12.84 (+2.0 m/s)	Rosa Rakotozafy	31 July 1999		Niort, France	
400 m hurdles	56.49	Cendrino Razaiarimalala	1 July 2001		Saint-Étienne, France	
3000 m steeplechase	9:44.50	Marie-Éliane Saholinirina	26 June 2016	African Championships	Durban, South Africa	
High jump	1.65 m	Hérilala Rakotoarimanana	14 June 1992	National Championships	Antananarivo, Madagascar	
High jump	1.68 m (Note: citizenship unclear)	Ashley Rambo	26 May 2011		Santhià, Italy	
Pole vault	2.45 m	Ange Rajaonah	27 August 2000	National Championships	Antananarivo, Madagascar	
Long jump	6.12 m	Brigitte Rampizafy	26 July 1997	National Championships	Antananarivo, Madagascar	
Triple jump	13.41 m w	Vaovao Rapitsaravolazandry	15 August 2007	Indian Ocean Island Games	Antananarivo, Madagascar	
Shot put	14.98 m	Ange-Doris Ratsimbazafy	12 June 2005		Colombes, France	
Discus throw	44.60 m	Ange-Doris Ratsimbazafy	17 August 2007	Indian Ocean Island Games	Antananarivo, Madagascar	
Hammer throw	53.18 m	Ange-Doris Ratsimbazafy	14 October 2003	All-Africa Games	Abuja, Nigeria	
Javelin throw	47.40 m	Marie Anita Tidahy	31 July 1999		Antananarivo, Madagascar	
Heptathlon	4831 pts	Mamy Rarivoarimanana	4–5 September 1997	Jeux de la Francophonie	Antananarivo, Madagascar	
Heptathlon	100m H / High jump / Shot put / 200m / Long jump / Javelin / 800m; 14.61 / 1.55 m / 10.61 m / 25.93 / 5.40 m / 34.23 m / 2:32.76					
20 km walk (road)	2:15:15	Edmondine Razafindravelo	18 April 2010		Saint-Denis, Réunion	
4 × 100 m relay	43.61	Madagascar; Monica Rahanitraniriana; Ony Paule Ratsimbazafy; Rosa Rakotozafy; Hanitrinianina Rakotondrabe	29 September 2000	Olympic Games	Sydney, Australia	
4 × 400 m relay	3:35.02	Madagascar; Aurélie Jonary; Cendrino Razaiarimalala; Monica Rahanitraniriana; Ony Paule Ratsimbazafy	5 September 1997	Jeux de la Francophonie	Antananarivo, Madagascar	

== Indoor ==
=== Men ===
Event	Record	Athlete	Date	Meet	Place	Ref.
60 m	6.89	Avotriniaina Rakotoarimiandy	16 January 2016		Val-de-Reuil, France	
60 m	6.89	Avotriniaina Rakotoarimiandy	30 January 2016		Val-de-Reuil, France	
200 m	21.59	Hubert Rakotombélontsoa	15 February 1997		Nogent-sur-Oise, France	
200 m	21.59	Avotriniaina Rakotoarimiandy	1 February 2014		Val-de-Reuil, France	
400 m	47.79	Avotriniaina Rakotoarimiandy	1 February 2014		Val-de-Reuil, France	
800 m	1:48.79	Joseph Rakotoarimanana	11 February 1996		Paris, France	
1500 m	3:48.07	Joseph Rakotoarimanana	26 February 1995		Liévin, France	
3000 m						
60 m hurdles	7.82	Joseph-Berlioz Randriamihaja	29 January 2005		Luxembourg, Luxembourg	
High jump	2.04 m	Pierre Yavizama	20 January 1989		Genoa, Italy	
Pole vault	4.50 m	Florian Henry	25 January 2003		Paris, France	
Pole vault	4.50 m	Ali Kame	12 January 2014		Metz, France	
Pole vault	4.50 m	Ali Kame	1 February 2014		Metz, France	
Long jump	7.18 m	Toussaint Rabenala	11 January 1992		Zaragoza, Spain	
Triple jump	16.74 m	Toussaint Rabenala	13 March 1993	World Championships	Toronto, Canada	
Shot put						
Heptathlon	5152 pts	Ali Kame	1 February 2014		Metz, France	
Heptathlon	60m / Long jump / Shot put / High jump / 60m H / Pole vault / 1000m; 7.32 / 6.83 m / 12.44 m / 1.79 m / 8.50 / 4.50 m / 2:53.07					
5000 m walk						
4 × 400 m relay						

=== Women ===
Event	Record	Athlete	Date	Meet	Place	Ref.
60 m	7.21	Lalao Ravaonirina	10 March 1995	World Championships	Barcelona, Spain	
200 m	24.35	Lalao Ravaonirina	31 January 1993		Bordeaux, France	
400 m						
800 m	2:08.42	Fanjanteino Félix	7 March 2008	World Championships	Valencia, Spain	
1500 m	4:19.64	Eliane Saholinirina	7 March 2014	World Championships	Sopot, Poland	
3000 m	9:32.02 (Note: outdoor mark ratified as absolute record)	Eliane Saholinirina	10 February 2015		Eaubonne, France	
60 m hurdles	7.89	Nicole Ramalalanirina	18 February 1996	Meeting Pas de Calais	Liévin, France	
High jump						
Pole vault						
Long jump	4.35 m	Josiane Botolahibe	21 December 2013		Lyon, France	
Triple jump						
Shot put	14.13 m	Doris Ange Ratsimbazafy	17 February 2008		Bordeaux, France	
Pentathlon						
Pentathlon	60m H / High jump / Shot put / Long jump / 800m					
3000 m walk						
4 × 400 m relay						
