= Madagascar at the 1972 Summer Olympics =

- IOC code: MAD
- NOC: Malagasy Olympic Committee

in Munich
- Competitors: 3 in 1 sport
- Flag bearer: Jean-Aimé Randrianalijaona
- Medals: Gold 0 Silver 0 Bronze 0 Total 0

Summer Olympics appearances (overview)
- 1964; 1968; 1972; 1976; 1980; 1984; 1988; 1992; 1996; 2000; 2004; 2008; 2012; 2016; 2020; 2024

Madagascar competed at the 1972 Summer Olympics in Munich, West Germany.

== Results by event ==
=== Athletics ===
Men's 400 metres

- Frédérique Andrianaivo

Men's 800 metres

- Edouard Rasoanaivo

- Heat — 1:50.8 (→ did not advance)

Men's 1500 metres

- Edouard Rasoanaivo

- Heat — 3:48.5 (→ did not advance)

Men's 4 × 100 m Relay

- Ravelomanantsoa Goman, Alfred Rabenja, Ariyamongkol Ralainasolo, and Henri Rafaralahy

- Heat — 40.58s (→ did not advance)

Men's 400 metres hurdles

- Jean-Aimé Randrianalijaona
