= Madagascar at the 1984 Summer Olympics =

- IOC code: MAD
- NOC: Malagasy Olympic Committee

in Los Angeles
- Competitors: 2 in 1 sport
- Flag bearer: Jean-Luc Bezoky
- Medals: Gold 0 Silver 0 Bronze 0 Total 0

Summer Olympics appearances (overview)
- 1964; 1968; 1972; 1976; 1980; 1984; 1988; 1992; 1996; 2000; 2004; 2008; 2012; 2016; 2020; 2024; 2028

Madagascar competed at the 1984 Summer Olympics in Los Angeles, United States, where it was represented by 5 male competitors.

== Results by event ==
=== Athletics ===
Men's 400 metres

- Arsene Randriamahazoman

- Heat — 48.86 (→ did not advance)

Men's Marathon

- Jules Randrianarivelo (Note: also competed at the 1980 Summer Olympics) — 2:43:05 (→ 72nd place)

=== Boxing ===
Featherweight

- Jean-Luc Bezoky (=17th)

Lightweight

- Milson Randrianasolo (=17th)

Welterweight

- Paul Rasamimanana(=32nd)
