= Madagascar at the 1980 Summer Olympics =

- IOC code: MAD
- NOC: Malagasy Olympic Committee

in Moscow
- Competitors: 11 in 3 sports
- Medals: Gold 0 Silver 0 Bronze 0 Total 0

Summer Olympics appearances (overview)
- 1964; 1968; 1972; 1976; 1980; 1984; 1988; 1992; 1996; 2000; 2004; 2008; 2012; 2016; 2020; 2024; 2028

Madagascar competed at the 1980 Summer Olympics in Moscow, USSR. The nation returned to the Olympic Games after boycotting the 1976 Summer Olympics.

== Results by event ==
=== Athletics ===
Men's 800 metres

- Tisbite Rakotoarisoa

- Heat — 1:50.5 (→ did not advance)

Men's 1,500 metres

- Tisbite Rakotoarisoa

- Heat — 3:55.9 (→ did not advance)

Men's 10,000 metres

- Jules Randrianarivelo (Note: also competed at the 1984 Summer Olympics)

- Heat — 31:18.4 (→ did not advance)

Men's Marathon

- Jules Randrianarivelo

- Final — 2:19:23 (→ 25th place)

Women's 800 metres

- Albertine Rahéliarisoa

- Heat — 2:11.7 (→ did not advance)

Women's 1,500 metres

- Albertine Rahéliarisoa

- Heat — 4:30.8 (→ did not advance)

=== Boxing ===
Men's Featherweight (57 kg)

- Anicet Sambo (=17th)

- First Round — Lost to Barthelémy Adoukonu (Benin) by disqualification

Men's Lightweight (60 kg)

- Sylvain Rajefiarison (=17th)

- First Round — Lost to Jesper Garnell (Denmark) on points (0-5)

Men's Welterweight

- Paul Rasamimanana (Note: also competed at the 1984 Summer Olympics) (=9th)

- Second Round — Lost to John Mugabi (Uganda; eventual silver medalist) by knockout

=== Swimming ===
Men's 100m Freestyle

- Zoe Andrianifaha

- Heats — 1:04.92 (→ did not advance)

Women's 100m Breaststroke

- Nicole Rajoharison

- Heats — 1:24.83 (→ did not advance)

Women's 100m Freestyle

- Bako Ratsifandrihamanana

- Heats — 1:07.27 (→ 25th - did not advance)

Women's 100m Butterfly

- Bako Ratsifandrihamanana

- Heats — 1:09.43 (→ 23rd - did not advance)
