= Ambato, Ambohidratrimo =

Ambohidratrimo
- Location in Madagascar
- Coordinates: 18°36′S 47°30′E
- Country: Madagascar
- Region: Analamanga
- District: Ambohidratrimo

Population Census 2019
  - Total: 10,642
- Time zone: UTC+3 (EAT)
- Postal code: 105

Ambato is a rural commune in Analamanga Region, in the Central Highlands of Madagascar.

It is bordered in the north by the communes of Androvakely, in its east by Sadabe, in the west by Anjanadoria, in the south by Manjakavaradrano and in its south-east by Avaratsena.
