= Madagascar at the 2004 Summer Olympics =

- IOC code: MAD
- NOC: Malagasy Olympic Committee

in Athens
- Competitors: 9 in 5 sports
- Flag bearer: Rosa Rakotozafy
- Medals: Gold 0 Silver 0 Bronze 0 Total 0

Summer Olympics appearances (overview)
- 1964; 1968; 1972; 1976; 1980; 1984; 1988; 1992; 1996; 2000; 2004; 2008; 2012; 2016; 2020; 2024

Madagascar competed at the 2004 Summer Olympics in Athens, Greece, from 13 to 29 August 2004.

== Athletics ==
Malagasy athletes have so far achieved qualifying standards in the following athletics events (up to a maximum of 3 athletes in each event at the 'A' Standard, and 1 at the 'B' Standard).

Men

Athlete	Event	Heat		Quarterfinal		Semifinal		Final	
Athlete	Event	Result	Rank	Result	Rank	Result	Rank	Result	Rank
Joseph Berlioz Randriamihaja	110 m hurdles	13.46 NR	5 q	13.64	6	did not advance			

Women

Athlete	Event	Heat		Semifinal		Final	
Athlete	Event	Result	Rank	Result	Rank	Result	Rank
Rosa Rakotozafy	100 m hurdles	13.67	7	did not advance			
Clarisse Rasoarizay	Marathon	—				2:48:14	43

Key

- Note–Ranks given for track events are within the athlete's heat only
- Q = Qualified for the next round
- q = Qualified for the next round as a fastest loser or, in field events, by position without achieving the qualifying target
- NR = National record
- N/A = Round not applicable for the event
- Bye = Athlete not required to compete in round

== Boxing ==
Madagascar sent two boxers to Athens.

Athlete	Event	Round of 32	Round of 16	Quarterfinals	Semifinals	Final	
Athlete	Event	Opposition Result	Opposition Result	Opposition Result	Opposition Result	Opposition Result	Rank
Lalaina Rabenarivo	Light flyweight	Hong M-W (KOR); L RSC	did not advance				
George Rakotoarimbelo	Flyweight	Aslanov (AZE); L WO	did not advance				

== Judo ==
Madagascar has qualified a single judoka.

Athlete	Event	Round of 32	Round of 16	Quarterfinals	Semifinals	Repechage 1	Repechage 2	Repechage 3	Final / BM	
Athlete	Event	Opposition Result	Opposition Result	Opposition Result	Opposition Result	Opposition Result	Opposition Result	Opposition Result	Opposition Result	Rank
Naina Ravaoarisoa	Women's −52 kg	Heylen (BEL); L 0000–0200	did not advance							

== Swimming ==
Men

Athlete	Event	Heat		Semifinal		Final	
Athlete	Event	Time	Rank	Time	Rank	Time	Rank
Jean Luc Razakarivony	100 m breaststroke	1:07.74	54	did not advance			

Women

Athlete	Event	Heat		Semifinal		Final	
Athlete	Event	Time	Rank	Time	Rank	Time	Rank
Aina Andriamanjatoarimanana	50 m freestyle	29.35	56	did not advance			

== Tennis ==
Madagascar nominated a female tennis player to compete in the tournament through a tripartite invitation.

Athlete	Event	Round of 64	Round of 32	Round of 16	Quarterfinals	Semifinals	Final / BM	
Athlete	Event	Opposition Score	Opposition Score	Opposition Score	Opposition Score	Opposition Score	Opposition Score	Rank
Dally Randriantefy	Women's singles	Perebiynis (UKR); L 3–6, 4–6	did not advance					
