= Madagascar at the 2008 Summer Olympics =

- IOC code: MAD
- NOC: Malagasy Olympic Committee

in Beijing
- Competitors: 6 in 4 sports
- Flag bearer: Jean de Dieu Soloniaina
- Medals: Gold 0 Silver 0 Bronze 0 Total 0

Summer Olympics appearances (overview)
- 1964; 1968; 1972; 1976; 1980; 1984; 1988; 1992; 1996; 2000; 2004; 2008; 2012; 2016; 2020; 2024

Madagascar was represented at the 2008 Summer Olympics in Beijing, China by the Malagasy Olympic Committee.

In total, six athletes including four men and two women represented Madagascar in four different sports including athletics, boxing, judo and swimming.

== Competitors ==
In total, six athletes represented Madagascar at the 2008 Summer Olympics in Beijing, China across four different sports.

Sport	Men	Women	Total
Athletics	1	1	2
Boxing	1	0	1
Judo	1	0	1
Swimming	1	1	2
Total	4	2	6

== Athletics ==
In total, two Madagascan athletes participated in the athletics events – Nirinaharifidy Ramilijaona in the women's 100 m and Joseph-Berlioz Randriamihaja in the men's 110 m hurdles.

The heats for the men's 110 m hurdles took place on 18 August 2008. Randriamihaja finished fifth in his heat in a time of 13.91 seconds and he did not advance to the quarter-finals.

Athlete	Event	Heat		Quarterfinal		Semifinal		Final	
Athlete	Event	Result	Rank	Result	Rank	Result	Rank	Result	Rank
Joseph-Berlioz Randriamihaja	110 m hurdles	13.91	5	Did not advance					

The heats for the women's 100 m took place on 16 August 2008. Ramilijaona finished fifth in her heat in a time of 12.07 seconds and she did not advance to the quarter-finals.

Athlete	Event	Heat		Quarterfinal		Semifinal		Final	
Athlete	Event	Result	Rank	Result	Rank	Result	Rank	Result	Rank
Nirinaharifidy Ramilijaona	100 m	12.07	7	Did not advance					

== Boxing ==
In total, one Madagascan athlete participated in the boxing events – Jean de Dieu Soloniaina in the lightweight category.

The first round in the bantamweight category took place on 11 August 2008. Soloniaina lost to Francisco Vargas of Mexico.

Athlete	Event	Round of 32	Round of 16	Quarterfinals	Semifinals	Final	
Athlete	Event	Opposition Result	Opposition Result	Opposition Result	Opposition Result	Opposition Result	Rank
Jean de Dieu Soloniaina	Lightweight	Vargas (MEX); L 2–9	Did not advance				

== Judo ==
In total, one Madagascan athlete participated in the judo events – Elie Norbert in the men's −60 kg category.

The men's −60 kg category took place on 9 August 2008. In the first round, Norbert lost by ippon to Kim Kyong-Jin of North Korea.

Athlete	Event	Round of 64	Round of 32	Round of 16	Quarterfinals	Semifinals	Repechage 1	Repechage 2	Repechage 3	Final / BM	
Athlete	Event	Opposition Result	Opposition Result	Opposition Result	Opposition Result	Opposition Result	Opposition Result	Opposition Result	Opposition Result	Opposition Result	Rank
Elie Norbert	Men's −60 kg	Bye	Kim K-J (PRK); L 0000–1000	Did not advance							

== Swimming ==
In total, two Madagascan athletes participated in the swimming events – Tojohanitra Andriamanjatoarimanana in the women's 50 m freestyle and Erik Rajohnson in the men's 100 m breaststroke.

The heats for the men's 100 m breaststroke took place on 9 August 2008. Rajohnson finished first in his heat in a time of one minute 57.45 seconds which was ultimately not fast enough to advance to the semi-finals.

Athlete	Event	Heat		Semifinal		Final	
Athlete	Event	Time	Rank	Time	Rank	Time	Rank
Erik Rajohnson	100 m breaststroke	1:08.42	59	Did not advance			

The heats for the women's 50 m freestyle took place on 15 August 2008. Andriamanjatoarimanana finished sixth in her heat in a time of 28.54 seconds which was ultimately not fast enough to advance to the semi-finals.

Athlete	Event	Heat		Semifinal		Final	
Athlete	Event	Time	Rank	Time	Rank	Time	Rank
Tojohanitra Andriamanjatoarimanana	50 m freestyle	28.54	60	Did not advance			

== See also ==
- Madagascar at the 2008 Summer Paralympics
