= Mialitiana Clerc =

Malagasy-French alpine skier (born 2001)

Personal information
- Born: 16 November 2001 (age 24) Ambohitrimanjaka, Madagascar

Skiing career
- Country: Madagascar
- Sport: Alpine skiing
- Club: Inter Club Magland Desert Blanc
- Disciplines: Slalom, giant slalom
- World Cup debut: 19 December 2017 (age 16)

Olympics
- Teams: 3 – (2018, 2022, 2026)

World Championships
- Teams: 3 – (2019, 2023, 2025)

World Cup
- Seasons: 6 – (2018–2021, 2025–2026)

Mialitiana Clerc (born 16 November 2001 in Ambohitrimanjaka, Madagascar) is French-Malagasy alpine skier who represents Madagascar at international events.

Clerc competed for Madagascar at the 2018 Winter Olympics in the alpine skiing events. She also competed at the 2022 Winter Olympics and at the 2026 Games, becoming the first African woman to compete at three Winter Olympics. Clerc became the first female to compete for Madagascar at the Winter Olympics.

Clerc was born in Madagascar and was adopted by a French family at the age of one and grew up in the Haute-Savoie region of the French Alps.

== World Championships results ==
Year
Year	Age	Slalom	Giant slalom	Super-G	Downhill	Combined	Team combined	Parallel	Team event
2019	17	40	50	—	—	—	—N/a	—N/a	—
2023	21	41	46	—	—	—	—N/a	—	—
2025	23	DNF2	46	—	—	—N/a	—	—N/a	—

== Olympic results ==
Year
Year	Age	Slalom	Giant slalom	Super-G	Downhill	Combined	Team combined
2018	16	47	48	—	—	—	—N/a
2022	20	43	41	—	—	—	—N/a
2026	24	49	50	—	—	—N/a	—

Olympic Games
Preceded by Eliane Saholinirina	Flagbearer for Madagascar; Pyeongchang 2018	Succeeded by Damiella Nomenjanahary; Éric Andriantsitohaina
Preceded by Damiella Nomenjanahary; Éric Andriantsitohaina	Flagbearer for Madagascar; Beijing 2022 with Mathieu Neumuller	Succeeded by Fabio Rakotoarimanana; Rosina Randafiarison
