= Nafi =

Nafi may refer to:

== People ==
=== Given name ===
- Nafi ibn al-Harith (died 634/35), Arab physician
- Nafi' bin Hilal al-Jamali (died 680), companion of Ali
- Nafi‘ al-Madani (689–785), Arab Quranic reciter
- Nafi Mawla Ibn Umar (died 735/36), Arab Islamic scholar
- Nafi Mersal (1960–2006), Egyptian sprinter
- Nafi Thiam (born 1994), Belgian athlete
- Nafi Toure (born 1971), Senegalese fencer
- Nafi Tuitavake (born 1989), New Zealander rugby player

=== Surname ===
- Basheer Nafi (born 1952), Palestinian-British historian
- Uqba ibn Nafi (622–683), Rashidun general
- Ibn al-Nafis (1210/11–1288/89), Arab polymath

== Other ==
- Nafi language
- an-Nafi, one of the names of God in Islam

== See also ==
- NAFI (disambiguation)
