= Madagascar at the 1996 Summer Olympics =

- IOC code: MAD
- NOC: Malagasy Olympic Committee

in Atlanta
- Competitors: 11 in 4 sports
- Flag bearer: Dally Randriantefy
- Medals: Gold 0 Silver 0 Bronze 0 Total 0

Summer Olympics appearances (overview)
- 1964; 1968; 1972; 1976; 1980; 1984; 1988; 1992; 1996; 2000; 2004; 2008; 2012; 2016; 2020; 2024

Madagascar competed at the 1996 Summer Olympics in Atlanta, United States.

== Competitors ==
The following is the list of number of competitors in the Games.

Sport	Men	Women	Total
Athletics	2	4	6
Boxing	1	–	1
Swimming	1	1	2
Tennis	0	2	2
Total	4	7	11

== Results by event ==
=== Athletics ===
==== Men ====
Track and road events

Athletes	Events	Heat Round 1		Heat Round 2		Semifinal		Final	
Athletes	Events	Time	Rank	Time	Rank	Time	Rank	Time	Rank
Joseph Rakotoarimanana	800 metres	1:47.33	29	N/A		did not advance			
Victor Razafindrakoto	Marathon	N/A						did not finish	

==== Women ====
Track and road events

Athletes	Events	Heat Round 1		Heat Round 2		Semifinal		Final	
Athletes	Events	Time	Rank	Time	Rank	Time	Rank	Time	Rank
Hanitriniaina Rakotondrabé	100 metres	11.36	21 Q	11.43	20	did not advance			
Nicole Ramalalanirina	100 metres hurdles	12.90	11 Q	12.90	12 Q	13.01	14	did not advance	
Lantoniaina Ramalalanirina; Hanitriniaina Rakotondrabé; Nicole Ramalalanirina; Lalao Robine Ravaoniriana	4 x 100 metres relay	did not finish		N/A				did not advance	

=== Boxing ===
Athlete	Event	Round of 32	Round of 16	Quarterfinal	Semifinal	Final
Athlete	Event	Opposition Result	Opposition Result	Opposition Result	Opposition Result	Opposition Result
Anicet Rasoanaivo	Light-flyweight	Baca (HON); W 12-0	Guardado (USA); L 9-4	Did not advance		

=== Swimming ===
Men

Athletes	Events	Heat		Finals	
Athletes	Events	Time	Rank	Time	Rank
Jean-Luc Razakarivony	100 m breaststroke	1:07.34	41	Did not advance	

Women

Athletes	Events	Heat		Finals	
Athletes	Events	Time	Rank	Time	Rank
Harijesy Razafindramahata	100 m backstroke	1:13.83	36	Did not advance	

=== Tennis ===
Women

Athlete	Event	Round of 64		Round of 32		Round of 16		Quarterfinals		Semifinals		Final		
Athlete	Event	Opposition	Score	Opposition	Score	Opposition	Score	Opposition	Score	Opposition	Score	Opposition	Score	Rank
Dally Randriantefy	Singles	Date (JPN)	L 0-6 1-6	Did not advance										
Dally Randriantefy; Natacha Randriantefy	Doubles	N/A		(Spain) Martínez, Sánchez Vicario (ESP)	L 1-6 3-6	did not advance								
