= Madagascar at the 1964 Summer Olympics =

- IOC code: MAD (MAG used at these Games)
- NOC: Malagasy Olympic Committee

in Tokyo
- Competitors: 3 in Athletics sports
- Medals: Gold 0 Silver 0 Bronze 0 Total 0

Summer Olympics appearances (overview)
- 1964; 1968; 1972; 1976; 1980; 1984; 1988; 1992; 1996; 2000; 2004; 2008; 2012; 2016; 2020; 2024

Madagascar competed in the Summer Olympic Games for the first time at the 1964 Summer Olympics in Tokyo, Japan, with three male competitors in athletics.

== Athletics ==
100 metres

- Jean-Louis Ravelomanantsoa (6th in heat 1)

200 metres

- Jean-Louis Ravelomanantsoa (8th in heat 8)

1500 metres

- Jean Randrianjatavo DNS

5000 metres

- Jean Randrianjatavo (11th in heat 1)

Marathon

- Jean Randrianjatavo DNS

Triple jump

- Marc Rabémila (28th)
