= Mahabo (disambiguation) =

Mahabo is a city in the Menabe Region of Madagascar.

Mahabo may also refer to the following places in Madagascar:

- Mahabo (district), containing the city
- Mahabo, Ambohidratrimo, a town and commune in Analamanga Region
- Mahabo, Betroka, a town and commune in Anosy Region
- Mahabo, Vohipeno, a town and commune in Vatovavy-Fitovinany Region
