= Ambato =

Ambato may refer to:

- Ambato Department, an administrative division in Catamarca Province, Argentina
- Ambato Canton, Ecuador
  - Ambato, Ecuador, a city in Ambato Canton
- Ambato-Boeni, a district in Madagascar
  - Ambato Ambarimay, a town and commune in Ambato-Boeni
- Ambato River, in Ecuador
- Ambato, Ambohidratrimo, a town in the district of Ambohidratrimo, Analamanga, Madagascar

== See also ==
- Ampato, a volcano in the Andes of southern Peru
