= Madagascar at the 1968 Summer Olympics =

- IOC code: MAD
- NOC: Malagasy Olympic Committee

in Mexico City
- Competitors: 4 in 2 sports
- Medals: Gold 0 Silver 0 Bronze 0 Total 0

Summer Olympics appearances (overview)
- 1964; 1968; 1972; 1976; 1980; 1984; 1988; 1992; 1996; 2000; 2004; 2008; 2012; 2016; 2020; 2024

Madagascar competed at the 1968 Summer Olympics in Mexico City, Mexico. Four competitors, all men, took part in six events in two sports.

== Athletics ==
- Jean-Louis Ravelomanantsoa

- 100 metres
1. First round: 10.2 s
2. Second round: 10.2 s
3. Semifinal: 10.2 s
4. Final: 10.2 s (→ 8th place)
- 200 metres — First round: 21.5 s (did not advance)

- Fernand Tovondray

- 110 metre hurdles — First round: 14.9 s (did not advance)
- High jump — Qualification: 2.03 m (did not advance)

- Dominique Rakotarahalahy

- Pole vault — did not start

== Cycling ==
One cyclist represented Madagascar in 1968.

Individual road race

- Solo Razafinarivo
