= Madagascar at the 1992 Summer Olympics =

- IOC code: MAD
- NOC: Malagasy Olympic Committee

in Barcelona
- Competitors: 13 in 6 sports
- Medals: Gold 0 Silver 0 Bronze 0 Total 0

Summer Olympics appearances (overview)
- 1964; 1968; 1972; 1976; 1980; 1984; 1988; 1992; 1996; 2000; 2004; 2008; 2012; 2016; 2020; 2024

Madagascar competed at the 1992 Summer Olympics in Barcelona, Spain. The nation returned to the Olympic Games after missing the 1988 Summer Olympics.

== Competitors ==
The following is the list of number of competitors in the Games.

Sport	Men	Women	Total
Athletics	3	2	5
Boxing	2	–	2
Judo	2	0	2
Swimming	0	1	1
Tennis	0	2	2
Weightlifting	1	–	1
Total	8	5	13

== Athletics ==
Men
Track and road events

Athlete	Event	Heats		Quarterfinal		Semifinal		Final	
Athlete	Event	Result	Rank	Result	Rank	Result	Rank	Result	Rank
Alain Razahasoa	Marathon	—						2:41:41	81
Hubert Rakotombelontsoa	400 metres hurdles	51.54	35	—		Did not advance			

Field events

Athlete	Event	Qualification		Final	
Athlete	Event	Distance	Position	Distance	Position
Toussaint Rabenala	Triple jump	16.84	14	Did not advance	

Women
Track and road events

Athlete	Event	Heats		Quarterfinal		Semifinal		Final	
Athlete	Event	Result	Rank	Result	Rank	Result	Rank	Result	Rank
Lalao Ravaoniriana	100 metres	11.74	33	Did not advance					
Lalao Ravaoniriana	200 metres	23.58	23 Q	23.63	25	Did not advance			
Nicole Ramalalanirina	100 metres hurdles	13.40	25	Did not advance					

== Boxing ==
Athlete	Event	Round of 32	Round of 16	Quarterfinals	Semifinals	Final	
Athlete	Event	Opposition Result	Opposition Result	Opposition Result	Opposition Result	Opposition Result	Rank
Anicet Rasoanaivo	Light flyweight	O (PRK); L KO	Did not advance				
Heritovo Rakotomanga	Featherweight	Sabuni (SWE); W 22–14	Dumitrescu (ROU); L 8–18	Did not advance			

== Judo ==
Men

Athlete	Event	Round of 64	Round of 32	Round of 16	Quarterfinals	Semifinals	Repechage			Final	
Athlete	Event	Round of 64	Round of 32	Round of 16	Quarterfinals	Semifinals	Round 1	Round 2	Round 3	Final	
Athlete	Event	Opposition Result	Opposition Result	Opposition Result	Opposition Result	Opposition Result	Opposition Result	Opposition Result	Opposition Result	Opposition Result	Rank
Luc Rasoanaivo-Razafy	71 kg	Shi (CHN); L	Did not advance								
Jean-Jacques Rakotomalala	78 kg	Gregni (LBA); W	García (ARG); L	Did not advance							

== Swimming ==
Women

Athlete	Event	Heats		Final A/B	
Athlete	Event	Time	Rank	Time	Rank
Vola Hanta Ratsifa Andrihamanana	50 metre freestyle	28.22	43	Did not advance	
Vola Hanta Ratsifa Andrihamanana	100 metre breaststroke	1:17.77	38	Did not advance	

== Tennis ==
Women

Athlete	Event	Round of 64	Round of 32	Round of 16	Quarterfinals	Semifinals	Final	
Athlete	Event	Opposition Result	Opposition Result	Opposition Result	Opposition Result	Opposition Result	Opposition Result	Rank
Dally Randriantefy	Singles	Hy (CAN); L (2–6, 1–6)	Did not advance					
Natacha Randriantefy	Singles	Suková (TCH); L (0–6, 1–6)	Did not advance					
Dally Randriantefy; Natacha Randriantefy	Doubles	—	Martínez / Sánchez Vicario (ESP); L (0–6, 0–6)	Did not advance				

== Weightlifting ==
Athlete	Event	Snatch		Clean & jerk		Total	Rank
Athlete	Event	Result	Rank	Result	Rank	Total	Rank
Harinela Randriamanarivo	60 kg	85.0	31	110.0	30	195.0	30

== Sources ==
- Official Olympic Reports
