= Madagascar at the Olympics =

- IOC code: MAD
- NOC: Comité Olympique Malgache
- Medals: Gold 0 Silver 0 Bronze 0 Total 0

Summer appearances
- 1964; 1968; 1972; 1976; 1980; 1984; 1988; 1992; 1996; 2000; 2004; 2008; 2012; 2016; 2020; 2024; 2028

Winter appearances
- 2006; 2010–2014; 2018; 2022; 2026

Madagascar first participated at the Summer Olympic Games in 1964 and has sent athletes to every games apart from 1976 and 1988. The largest group the country ever sent to an Olympic games was 10 in 2000. They have never won a medal. Their highest placement so far is by sprinter Jean-Louis Ravelomanantsoa, who reached the final of the men's 100 metres in the 1968 Summer Olympics and finished eighth.

The nation participated at the Winter Olympic Games for the first time in 2006 and did not compete again until 2018.

== Medal tables ==
=== Medals by Summer Games ===
Games	Athletes	Gold	Silver	Bronze	Total	Rank
1964 Tokyo	3	0	0	0	0	–
1968 Mexico City	4	0	0	0	0	–
1972 Munich	3	0	0	0	0	–
1976 Montreal	did not participate					
1980 Moscow	6	0	0	0	0	–
1984 Los Angeles	2	0	0	0	0	–
1988 Seoul	did not participate					
1992 Barcelona	9	0	0	0	0	–
1996 Atlanta	2	0	0	0	0	–
2000 Sydney	10	0	0	0	0	–
2004 Athens	9	0	0	0	0	–
2008 Beijing	6	0	0	0	0	–
2012 London	7	0	0	0	0	–
2016 Rio de Janeiro	6	0	0	0	0	–
2020 Tokyo	6	0	0	0	0	–
2024 Paris	7	0	0	0	0	–
2028 Los Angeles	future event					
2032 Brisbane	future event					
Total		0	0	0	0	–

=== Medals by Winter Games ===
Games	Athletes	Gold	Silver	Bronze	Total	Rank
2006 Turin	1	0	0	0	0	–
2010 Vancouver	did not participate					
2014 Sochi	did not participate					
2018 Pyeongchang	1	0	0	0	0	–
2022 Beijing	2	0	0	0	0	–
2026 Milano Cortina	2	0	0	0	0	–
2030 French Alps	future event					
2034 Utah	future event					
Total		0	0	0	0	–

== See also ==
- List of flag bearers for Madagascar at the Olympics
- Tropical nations at the Winter Olympics
- Madagascar at the Paralympics
