= Madagascar at the 2020 Summer Olympics =

- IOC code: MAD
- NOC: Malagasy Olympic Committee

in Tokyo, Japan July 23, 2021 – August 8, 2021
- Competitors: 6 in 4 sports
- Flag bearers (opening): Damiella Nomenjanahary; Éric Andriantsitohaina
- Flag bearer (closing): N/A
- Medals: Gold 0 Silver 0 Bronze 0 Total 0

Summer Olympics appearances (overview)
- 1964; 1968; 1972; 1976; 1980; 1984; 1988; 1992; 1996; 2000; 2004; 2008; 2012; 2016; 2020; 2024

Madagascar sent a delegation that competed at the 2020 Summer Olympics in Tokyo. The games were originally scheduled to take place from 24 July to 9 August 2020, but were postponed to 23 July to 8 August 2021, due to the COVID-19 pandemic. It was the nation's thirteenth appearance at the Olympics, since its debut in 1964.

Six athletes from Madagascar were selected for the Games, competing in four different sports. Damiella Nomenjanahary and Éric Andriantsitohaina were chosen to be Madagascar's flag bearers during the Parade of Nations of the opening ceremony. There were no Malagasy athletes at the closing ceremony.

== Competitors ==
The following is the list of number of competitors in the Games.

Sport	Men	Women	Total
Athletics	1	0	1
Judo	0	1	1
Swimming	1	1	2
Weightlifting	2	0	2
Total	4	2	6

== Athletics ==
Madagascar received a universality slot from the World Athletics to send a male track and field athlete to the Olympics.

Todisoa Rabearison finished eighth in his heat for the Men's 400 metres with a time of 48.40, his season's best, but 1.6 seconds slower than his personal best, and did not advance.

Key

- Note–Ranks given for track events are within the athlete's heat only
- Q = Qualified for the next round
- q = Qualified for the next round as a fastest loser or, in field events, by position without achieving the qualifying target
- NR = National record
- N/A = Round not applicable for the event
- Bye = Athlete not required to compete in round

Track & road events

Athlete	Event	Heat		Semifinal		Final	
Athlete	Event	Result	Rank	Result	Rank	Result	Rank
Todisoa Rabearison	Men's 400 m	48.40 SB	8	Did not advance			

== Judo ==
Madagascar qualified one judoka for the women's half-middleweight category (63 kg) at the Games. Damiella Nomenjanahary accepted a continental berth from Africa as the nation's top-ranked judoka outside of direct qualifying position in the IJF World Ranking List of June 28, 2021.

Athlete	Event	Round of 32	Round of 16	Quarterfinals	Semifinals	Repechage	Final / BM	
Athlete	Event	Opposition Result	Opposition Result	Opposition Result	Opposition Result	Opposition Result	Opposition Result	Rank
Damiella Nomenjanahary	Women's −63 kg	Centracchio (ITA); L 00–01	Did not advance					

== Swimming ==
Madagascar received a universality invitation from FINA to send two top-ranked swimmers (one per gender) in their respective individual events to the Olympics, based on the FINA Points System of June 28, 2021.

Athlete	Event	Heat		Semifinal		Final	
Athlete	Event	Time	Rank	Time	Rank	Time	Rank
Heriniavo Rasolonjatovo	Men's 100 m backstroke	59.81	40	Did not advance			
Tiana Rabarijaona	Women's 400 m freestyle	4:28.41	23	—		Did not advance	

== Weightlifting ==
Madagascar entered two weightlifters into the Olympic competition. Brothers Éric Andriantsitohaina (men's 61 kg) and Tojonirina Andriantsitohaina (men's 67 kg) both topped the field of weightlifters from the African zone in their respective weight divisions based on the IWF Absolute Continental Rankings.

At the Olympics, Tojonirina Andriantsitohaina finished eleventh in the 67kg competition, lifting 130 kg in the snatch and 155 kg in the clean and jerk for a total weight of 285 kg. Éric Andriantsitohaina lifted 114 kg in the snatch and 150 kg in the clean and jerk for a total weight of 264 kg, finishing in the same placement as his teammate Andriantsitohaina during the men's 61-kg division.

Athlete	Event	Snatch		Clean & Jerk		Total	Rank
Athlete	Event	Result	Rank	Result	Rank	Total	Rank
Éric Andriantsitohaina	Men's −61 kg	114	13	150	9	264	11
Tojonirina Andriantsitohaina	Men's −67 kg	130	13	155	11	285	11
