= Madagascar at the 2012 Summer Olympics =

- IOC code: MAD
- NOC: Malagasy Olympic Committee

in London
- Competitors: 7 in 5 sports
- Flag bearer: Fetra Ratsimiziva
- Medals: Gold 0 Silver 0 Bronze 0 Total 0

Summer Olympics appearances (overview)
- 1964; 1968; 1972; 1976; 1980; 1984; 1988; 1992; 1996; 2000; 2004; 2008; 2012; 2016; 2020; 2024; 2028

Madagascar competed at the 2012 Summer Olympics in London, United Kingdom from 27 July to 12 August 2012. This was the nation's eleventh appearance at the Olympics, having missed the 1976 Summer Olympics in Montreal and the 1988 Summer Olympics in Seoul, because of the African and North Korean boycott.

Comité Olympique Malgache sent a total of 7 athletes to the Games, 3 men and 4 women, to compete in 5 sports. For the second time in Olympic history, Madagascar was represented by more female than male athletes. Judoka and Olympic qualifier Fetra Ratsimiziva was the nation's flag bearer at the opening ceremony. Among the five sports played by the athletes, Madagascar made its Olympic debut in freestyle wrestling. Madagascar, however, has yet to win its first ever Olympic medal.

== Athletics ==
Key

- Note–Ranks given for track events are within the athlete's heat only
- Q = Qualified for the next round
- q = Qualified for the next round as a fastest loser or, in field events, by position without achieving the qualifying target
- NR = National record
- N/A = Round not applicable for the event
- Bye = Athlete not required to compete in round

Men

Athlete	Event	Heat		Semifinal		Final	
Athlete	Event	Result	Rank	Result	Rank	Result	Rank
Ali Kamé	110 m hurdles	DSQ		Did not advance			

Women

Athlete	Event	Heat		Semifinal		Final	
Athlete	Event	Result	Rank	Result	Rank	Result	Rank
Marie Eliane Saholinirina	1500 m	4:19.46	12	Did not advance			

== Judo ==
Athlete	Event	Round of 64	Round of 32	Round of 16	Quarterfinals	Semifinals	Repechage	Final / BM	
Athlete	Event	Opposition Result	Opposition Result	Opposition Result	Opposition Result	Opposition Result	Opposition Result	Opposition Result	Rank
Fetra Ratsimiziva	Men's −81 kg	Bye	Lucenti (ARG); L 0001–1000	Did not advance					

== Swimming ==
Men

Athlete	Event	Heat		Semifinal		Final	
Athlete	Event	Time	Rank	Time	Rank	Time	Rank
Tsilavina Ramanantsoa	200 m breaststroke	DSQ		Did not advance			

Women

Athlete	Event	Heat		Semifinal		Final	
Athlete	Event	Time	Rank	Time	Rank	Time	Rank
Estellah Fils Rabetsara	100 m freestyle	1:02.39	43	Did not advance			

== Weightlifting ==
Madagascar has achieved the following quota place.

Athlete	Event	Snatch		Clean & Jerk		Total	Rank
Athlete	Event	Result	Rank	Result	Rank	Total	Rank
Nathalia Rakotondramanana	Women's −48 kg	55	12	80	12	135	12

== Wrestling ==
Madagascar has qualified one quota place.

Key:

- VT – Victory by Fall.
- PP – Decision by Points – the loser with technical points.
- PO – Decision by Points – the loser without technical points.

Women's freestyle

Athlete	Event	Qualification	Round of 16	Quarterfinal	Semifinal	Repechage 1	Repechage 2	Final / BM	
Athlete	Event	Opposition Result	Opposition Result	Opposition Result	Opposition Result	Opposition Result	Opposition Result	Opposition Result	Rank
Josiane Soloniaina	−72 kg	Bye	Ali (CMR); L 0–5 ^{VT}	Did not advance					15
