= Antehiroka =

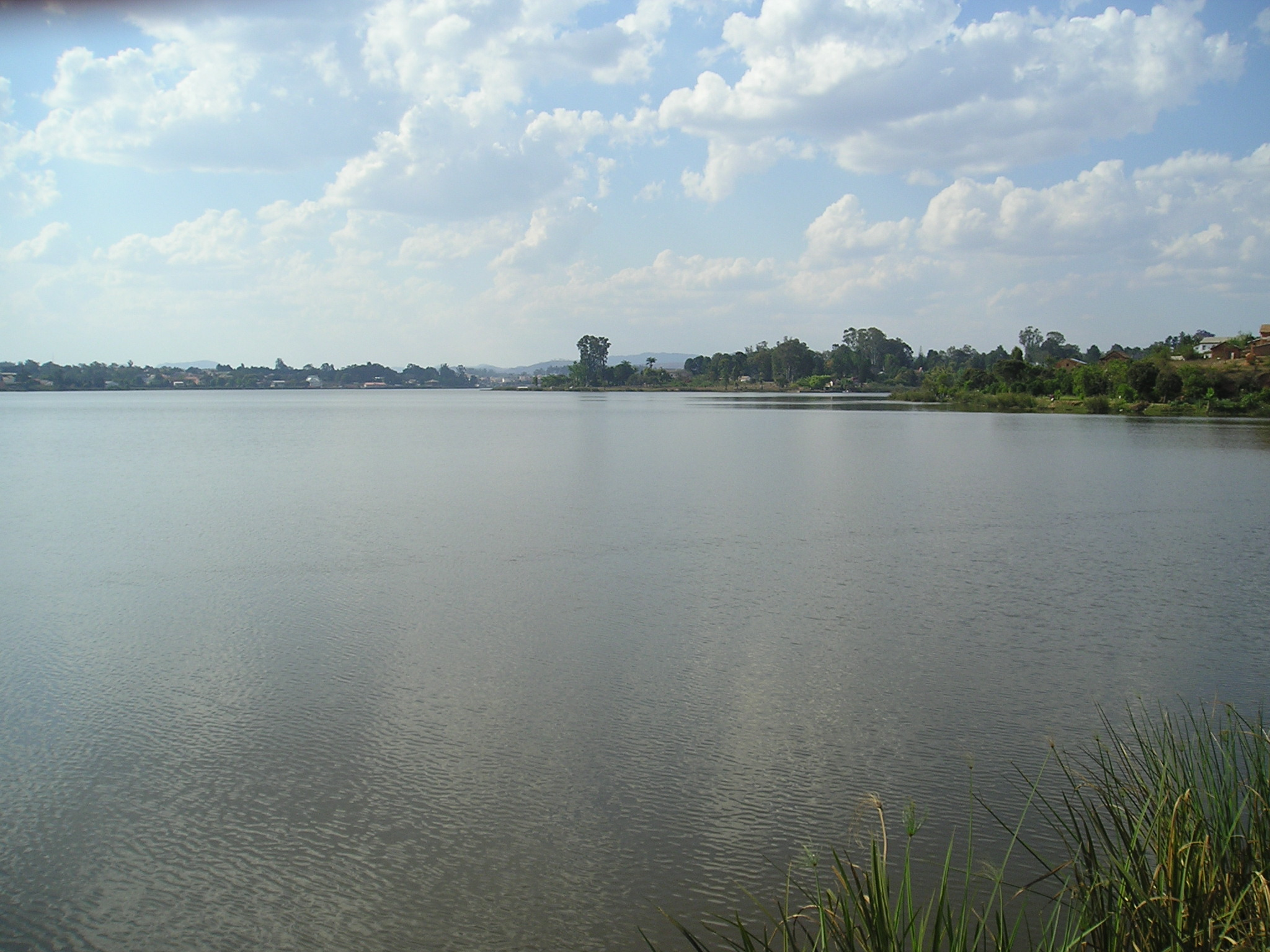

- Location in Madagascar
- Coordinates: 18°51′S 47°29′E
- Country: Madagascar
- Region: Analamanga
- District: Ambohidratrimo (district)

Area Monographie
  - Total: 10.15 km^{2} (3.92 sq mi)

Population Monographie de la commune
  - Total: 80,360
- Time zone: UTC3 (EAT)

Antehiroka is a town and commune in Madagascar. It belongs to the district of Ambohidratrimo (district), which is a part of Analamanga Region.

Antehiroka is located in a distance of 5 km from Antananarivo and 5 km from Ivato. It is traversed by the RN 4 to Mahajanga.

The population of the commune was estimated to be approximately 80,360.
