= Ivato =

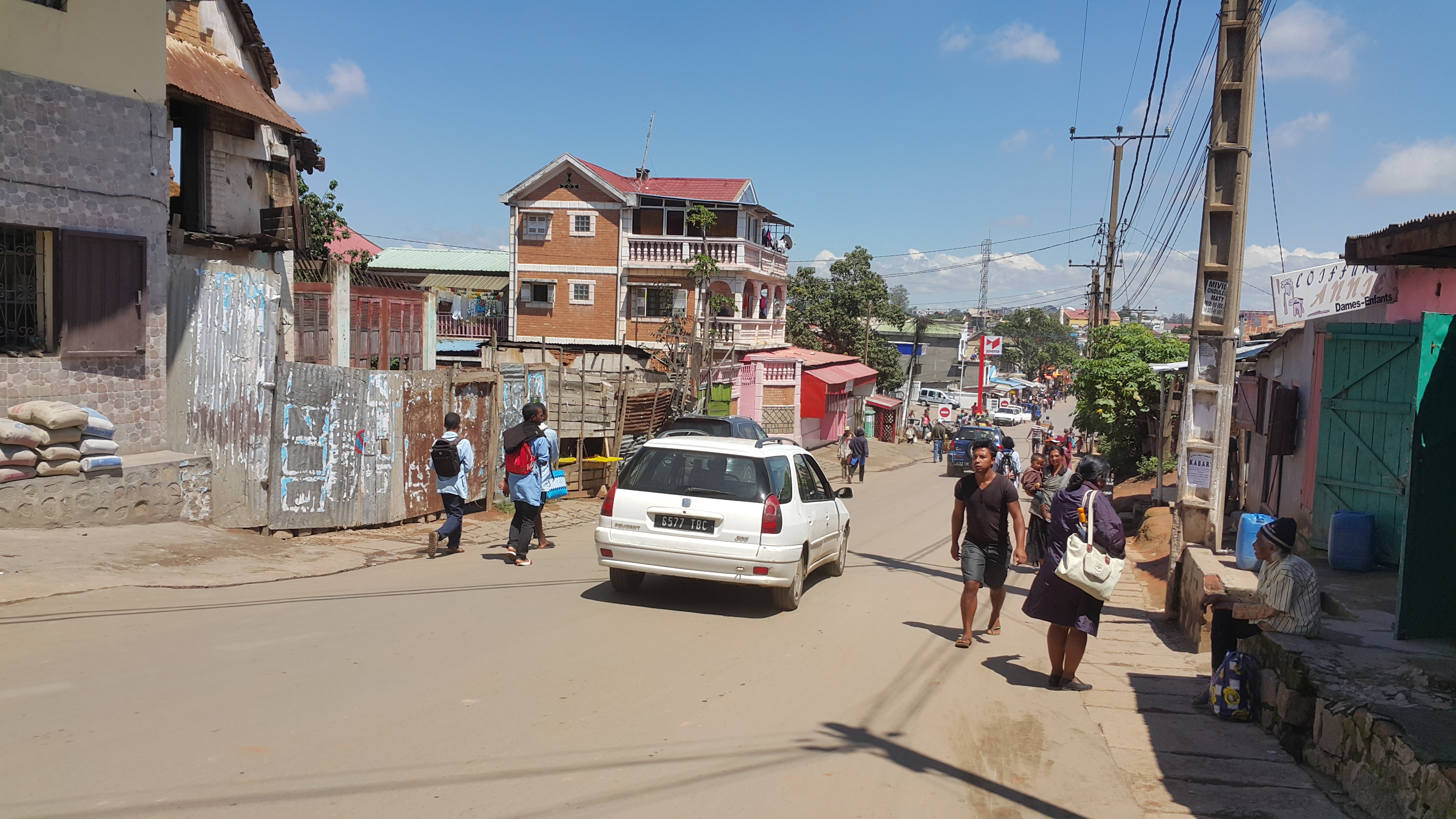
- Ivato

- Location in Madagascar
- Coordinates: 18°48′S 47°29′E
- Country: Madagascar
- Region: Analamanga
- District: Ambohidratrimo (district)
- Elevation: 1,259 m (4,131 ft)

Population (2018)
  - Total: 52,376
- Time zone: UTC3 (EAT)
- postal code: 105

Ivato is a town and commune in Madagascar. It belongs to the district of Ambohidratrimo (district), which is a part of Analamanga Region.

It lies North from the capital Antananarivo and the Ivato International Airport of Antanananarivo is situated in this commune. The population of the commune was estimated to be approximately 52,376 in 2018.

== Road infrastructure ==
The National Road 52.

== References and notes ==
- Monographie Region Analamanga
- Fusion communes
