= Antsahafilo =

- Location in Madagascar
- Coordinates: 18°40′S 47°32′E
- Country: Madagascar
- Region: Analamanga
- District: Ambohidratrimo (district)

Population
  - Total: 2,560
- Time zone: UTC3 (EAT)

Antsahafilo is a town and commune in Madagascar. It belongs to the district of Ambohidratrimo (district), which is a part of Analamanga Region. The population of the commune was estimated to be approximately 2.560.
