= Athletics at the 1984 Summer Olympics – Men's 400 metres =

Men's 400 metres at the Games of the XXIII Olympiad
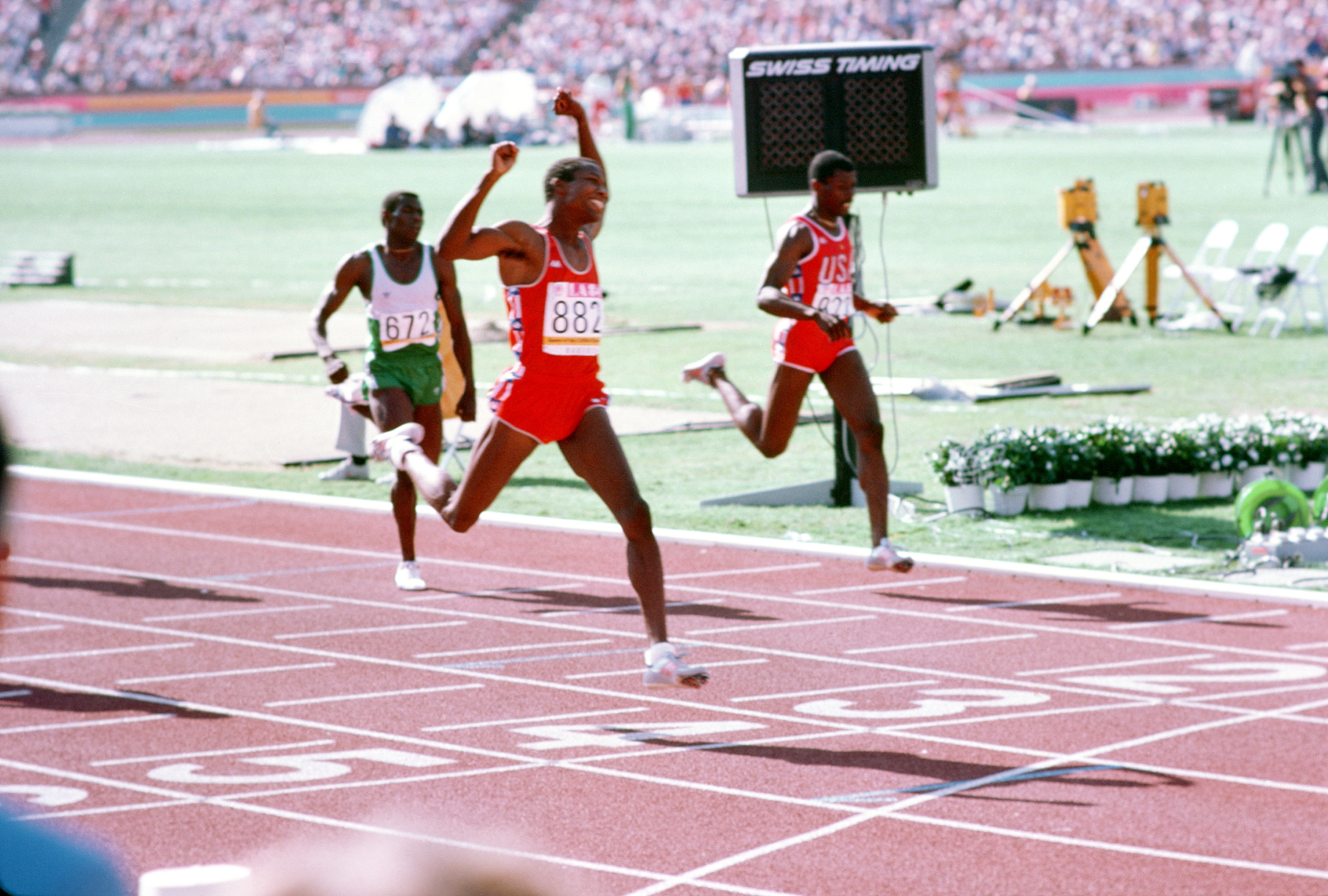
- Alonzo Babers winning the gold medal
- Venue: Los Angeles Memorial Coliseum
- Dates: 4 to 8 August
- Competitors: 80 from 56 nations
- Winning time: 44.27

Medalists
1st place, gold medalist(s)		Alonzo Babers; United States
2nd place, silver medalist(s)		Gabriel Tiacoh; Ivory Coast
3rd place, bronze medalist(s)		Antonio McKay; United States

The men's 400 metres was an event at the 1984 Summer Olympics in Los Angeles, California. It was held from August 4 to August 8. Eighty athletes from 56 nations competed. The maximum number of athletes per nation had been set at 3 since the 1930 Olympic Congress. The event was won by 0.27 seconds by Alonzo Babers, returning the United States to the top of the podium for the first time since 1972 (and the 13th time overall). Gabriel Tiacoh won the Ivory Coast's first Olympic medal in any event, with a silver.

== Background ==
This was the twentieth appearance of the event, which is one of 12 athletics events to have been held at every Summer Olympics. None of the finalists from 1980 returned. The favorites were Bert Cameron of Jamaica (winner of the first world championship in 1983) and Americans Antonio McKay and Alonzo Babers.

The British Virgin Islands, Cameroon, Chad, Equatorial Guinea, the Gambia, Mauritius, Mozambique, Nepal, Oman, Rwanda, Somalia, Suriname, Togo, the United Arab Emirates, and Zimbabwe appeared in this event for the first time. The United States made its 19th appearance, most of any nation, having missed only the boycotted 1980 Games.

== Competition format ==
The competition retained the basic four-round format from 1920. The "fastest loser" system, introduced in 1964, was used for the first round. There were 10 first-round heats, each with 8 runners. The top three runners in each heat advanced, along with the next two fastest overall. The 32 quarterfinalists were divided into 4 quarterfinals with 8 runners each; the top four athletes in each quarterfinal heat advanced to the semifinals, with no "fastest loser" spots. The semifinals featured 2 heats of 8 runners each. The top four runners in each semifinal heat advanced, making an eight-man final.

== Records ==
These were the standing world and Olympic records (in seconds) prior to the 1976 Summer Olympics.

World record	Lee Evans (USA)	43.86	Mexico City, Mexico	18 October 1968
Olympic record	Lee Evans (USA)	43.86	Mexico City, Mexico	18 October 1968

No world or Olympic records were set during this event. National records set were:

Nation	Athlete	Round	Time
Barbados	Elvis Forde	Semifinal 2	45.32
Somalia	Ibrahim Okash	Heat 1	47.91

== Schedule ==
For the first time, the event was held on four separate days, with each round being on a different day.

All times are Pacific Daylight Time (UTC-7)

Date	Time	Round
Saturday, 4 August 1984	10:30	Round 1
Sunday, 5 August 1984	17:00	Quarterfinals
Monday, 6 August 1984	16:55	Semifinals
Wednesday, 8 August 1984	16:45	Final

== Results ==
=== Round 1 ===
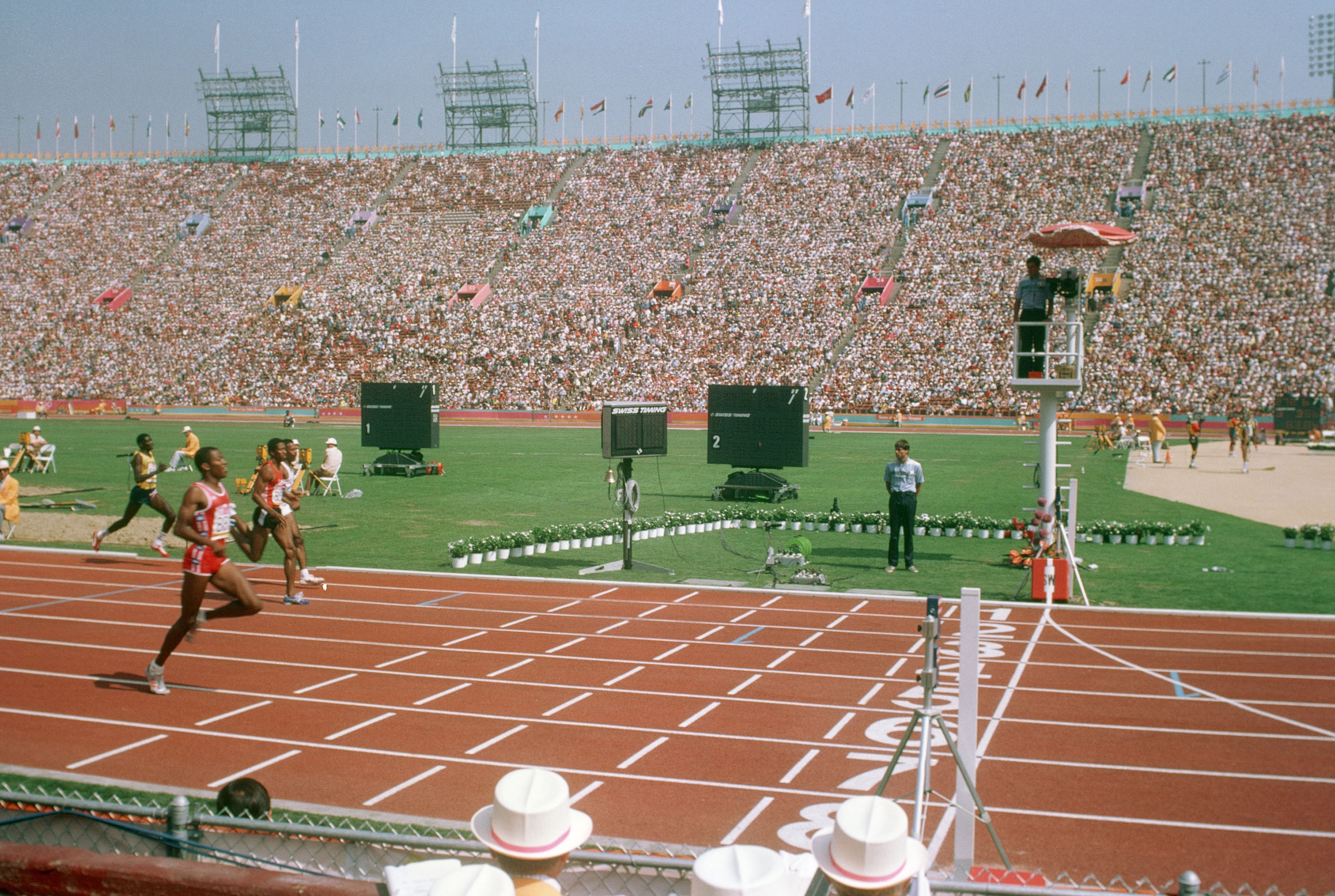
Alonzo Babers wins heat of the 400 meters.

==== Heat 1 ====
Rank	Lane	Athlete	Nation	Time	Notes
1	5	Davison Lishebo	Zambia	46.20	Q
2	1	David Peltier	Barbados	46.57	Q
3	7	Allan Ingraham	Bahamas	46.72	Q
4	6	Boubacar Diallo	Senegal	46.73	
5	2	Dean Greenaway	British Virgin Islands	47.33	
6	3	Evaldo da Silva	Brazil	47.55	
7	4	Ibrahim Okash	Somalia	47.91	NR
8	8	Issaka Hassane	Chad	49.64	

==== Heat 2 ====
Rank	Lane	Athlete	Nation	Time	Notes
1	3	Gabriel Tiacoh	Ivory Coast	45.96	Q
2	6	David Kitur	Kenya	46.25	Q
3	5	Marcel Arnold	Switzerland	46.46	Q
4	2	Gary Minihan	Australia	46.93	
5	1	Nordin Jadi	Malaysia	47.12	
6	7	Tommy Johansson	Sweden	47.77	
7	8	Daniel Andre	Mauritius	49.09	
8	4	Faustin Butéra	Rwanda	51.41	

==== Heat 3 ====
Rank	Lane	Athlete	Nation	Time	Notes
1	1	Innocent Egbunike	Nigeria	46.63	Q
2	5	Mark Senior	Jamaica	46.73	Q
3	8	Gérson de Souza	Brazil	47.02	Q
4	6	Manuel Ramirez-Caicedo	Colombia	47.17	
5	7	Bryan Saunders	Canada	47.40	
6	4	Mohamed Amer Al-Malky	Oman	47.61	
7	3	Meesaq Rizvi	Pakistan	49.58	
—	2	Secundino Borabota	Equatorial Guinea	DSQ	

==== Heat 4 ====
Rank	Lane	Athlete	Nation	Time	Notes
1	4	Bertland Cameron	Jamaica	46.14	Q
2	7	Oddur Sigurdsson	Iceland	46.30	Q
3	2	Doug Hinds	Canada	46.42	Q
4	1	Richard Louis	Barbados	46.70	
5	5	Jean-Didace Bemou	Republic of the Congo	47.26	
6	3	Hector Llatser	France	47.30	
7	8	Phillip Pipersburg	Belize	48.04	
8	6	Alberto López	Guatemala	52.21	

==== Heat 5 ====
Rank	Lane	Athlete	Nation	Time	Notes
1	7	Alonzo Babers	United States	45.81	Q
2	3	Michael Paul	Trinidad and Tobago	46.18	Q
3	2	Philip Brown	Great Britain	46.26	Q
4	1	Moses Kyeswa	Uganda	46.78	
5	8	Tim Bethune	Canada	46.98	
6	6	Joseph Ramotshabi	Botswana	48.11	
7	5	Dawda Jallow	The Gambia	48.36	
8	4	René López	El Salvador	48.71	

==== Heat 6 ====
Rank	Lane	Athlete	Nation	Time	Notes
1	1	Bruce Frayne	Australia	46.08	Q
2	2	Aldo Canti	France	46.14	Q
3	8	Susumu Takano	Japan	46.26	Q
4	6	Nafi Mersal	Egypt	46.46	
5	3	Alfred Browne	Antigua and Barbuda	47.29	
6	7	Rashid Al-Jirbi	United Arab Emirates	48.71	
7	4	Siegfried Cruden	Suriname	50.07	
—	5	Hassan El-Kashief	Sudan	DNF	

==== Heat 7 ====
Rank	Lane	Athlete	Nation	Time	Notes
1	2	Sunder Nix	United States	45.42	Q
2	6	Elvis Forde	Barbados	45.47	Q
3	7	Antonio Sánchez	Spain	46.03	Q
4	4	Anton Skerritt	Trinidad and Tobago	46.30	q
5	5	James Atuti	Kenya	47.04	
6	8	Adjé Adjeoda Vignon	Togo	47.43	
7	3	Lapule Tamean	Papua New Guinea	47.60	
8	1	Pushpa Raj Ojha	Nepal	52.12	

==== Heat 8 ====
Rank	Lane	Athlete	Nation	Time	Notes
1	5	Antonio McKay	United States	45.55	Q
2	1	John Anzrah	Kenya	46.12	Q
3	7	Isidro del Prado	Philippines	46.82	Q
4	6	Leonardo Loforte	Mozambique	47.07	
5	3	Joseph Rodan	Fiji	49.00	
6	8	Agripa Mwausegha	Malawi	49.12	
7	4	Charles Moses	Ghana	50.39	
—	2	Ali St. Louis	Trinidad and Tobago	DNF	

==== Heat 9 ====
Rank	Lane	Athlete	Nation	Time	Notes
1	2	Erwin Skamrahl	West Germany	45.94	Q
2	5	Angel Heras	Spain	46.06	Q
3	3	Todd Bennett	Great Britain	46.09	Q
4	4	Yann Quentrec	France	46.94	
5	7	Wilson dos Santos	Brazil	47.55	
6	8	Mark Handelsman	Israel	48.17	
7	1	Chris Madzokere	Zimbabwe	48.49	
8	6	Arsène Randriamahazomana	Madagascar	48.86	

==== Heat 10 ====
Rank	Lane	Athlete	Nation	Time	Notes
1	6	Kriss Akabusi	Great Britain	45.64	Q
2	3	Darren Clark	Australia	45.68	Q
3	5	Sunday Uti	Nigeria	45.74	Q
4	2	Devon Morris	Jamaica	45.80	q
5	1	Mike Okot	Uganda	46.68	
6	8	Samuel Sarkpa	Liberia	47.65	
7	7	Mama Moluh	Cameroon	48.90	
—	4	Vincent Confait	Seychelles	DSQ	

=== Quarterfinals ===
==== Quarterfinal 1 ====
Rank	Lane	Athlete	Nation	Time	Notes
1	8	Antonio McKay	United States	44.72	Q
2	6	Darren Clark	Australia	44.77	Q
3	3	Kriss Akabusi	Great Britain	45.43	Q
4	4	Dave Lishebo	Zambia	45.57	Q
5	2	John Anzrah	Kenya	45.67	
6	1	Devon Morris	Jamaica	46.14	
7	7	Allan Ingraham	Bahamas	46.14	
8	5	David Peltier	Barbados	46.48	

==== Quarterfinal 2 ====
Rank	Lane	Athlete	Nation	Time	Notes
1	4	Innocent Egbunike	Nigeria	45.26	Q
2	5	Sunder Nix	United States	45.31	Q
3	2	Elvis Forde	Barbados	45.60	Q
4	7	Aldo Canti	France	45.64	Q
5	3	Angel Heras	Spain	45.88	
6	6	Marcel Arnold	Switzerland	46.10	
7	8	Philip Brown	Great Britain	46.63	
8	1	Anton Skerritt	Trinidad and Tobago	46.93	

==== Quarterfinal 3 ====
Rank	Lane	Athlete	Nation	Time	Notes
1	5	Alonzo Babers	United States	44.75	Q, PB
2	1	Sunday Uti	Nigeria	45.01	Q
3	8	Bertland Cameron	Jamaica	45.16	Q
4	7	Bruce Frayne	Australia	45.35	Q
5	6	Todd Bennett	Great Britain	45.51	
6	2	Antonio Sánchez	Spain	45.79	
7	4	Oddur Sigurdsson	Iceland	46.07	
8	3	Doug Hinds	Canada	46.19	

==== Quarterfinal 4 ====
Rank	Lane	Athlete	Nation	Time	Notes
1	2	Gabriel Tiacoh	Ivory Coast	45.15	Q
2	6	David Kitur	Kenya	45.78	Q
3	8	Michael Paul	Trinidad and Tobago	45.84	Q
4	4	Susumu Takano	Japan	45.91	Q
5	1	Erwin Skamrahl	West Germany	46.39	
6	7	Mark Senior	Jamaica	46.50	
7	3	Gerson Souza	Brazil	46.65	
8	5	Isidro del Prado	Philippines	46.71	

=== Semifinals ===
==== Semifinal 1 ====
Rank	Lane	Athlete	Nation	Time	Notes
1	3	Innocent Egbunike	Nigeria	45.16	Q
2	7	Alonzo Babers	United States	45.17	Q
3	1	Darren Clark	Australia	45.26	Q
4	6	Sunder Nix	United States	45.41	Q
5	8	Aldo Canti	France	45.59	
6	5	Michael Paul	Trinidad and Tobago	45.60	
7	2	Kriss Akabusi	Great Britain	45.69	
8	4	Susumu Takano	Japan	45.88	

==== Semifinal 2 ====
Cameron pulled up with an injury at 150 metres, hopping for about 20 metres before returning to a run. Despite the injury, he finished fourth to qualify for the final (in which he ultimately would not be able to run).

Rank	Lane	Athlete	Nation	Time	Notes
1	4	Gabriel Tiacoh	Ivory Coast	44.64	Q
2	8	Sunday Uti	Nigeria	44.83	Q
3	3	Antonio McKay	United States	44.92	Q
4	2	Bertland Cameron	Jamaica	45.10	Q
5	5	Bruce Frayne	Australia	45.21	
6	1	Elvis Forde	Barbados	45.32	NR
7	6	David Kitur	Kenya	45.62	
8	7	Dave Lishebo	Zambia	45.97	

=== Final ===
Cameron was still injured from the semifinal race and could not start the final. Clark led early and held the lead until the final straight. Babers began his successful push from about the 250 metre mark, with Tiacoh behind him. McKay edged Clark and Nix at the finish.

Rank	Lane	Athlete	Nation	Time	Notes
1st place, gold medalist(s)	4	Alonzo Babers	United States	44.27	PB
2nd place, silver medalist(s)	7	Gabriel Tiacoh	Ivory Coast	44.54	
3rd place, bronze medalist(s)	1	Antonio McKay	United States	44.71	
4	5	Darren Clark	Australia	44.75	
5	6	Sunder Nix	United States	44.75	
6	2	Sunday Uti	Nigeria	44.93	
7	3	Innocent Egbunike	Nigeria	45.35	
—	8	Bertland Cameron	Jamaica	DNS	

== In popular culture ==
In the UK TV show Little Britain, character Denver Mills is credited as having won the silver medal in the 400 metres at the 1984 Olympics.

== See also ==
- 1982 Men's European Championships 400 metres (Athens)
- 1984 Men's Friendship Games 400 metres (Moscow)
- 1988 Men's Olympic 400 metres (Seoul)
