= René López (athlete) =

Salvadoran sprinter

Personal information
- Full name: René López Escobar
- Nationality: Salvadoran
- Born: 14 June 1963
- Height: 1.90 m (6 ft 3 in)
- Weight: 76 kg (168 lb)

Sport
- Sport: Sprinting
- Event: 400 metres

René López Escobar (born 14 June 1963, date of death unknown) was a Salvadoran sprinter. He competed in the men's 400 metres at the 1984 Summer Olympics.

His personal best in the 400 metres is 48.4 set in 1985.
