= Talatamaty =

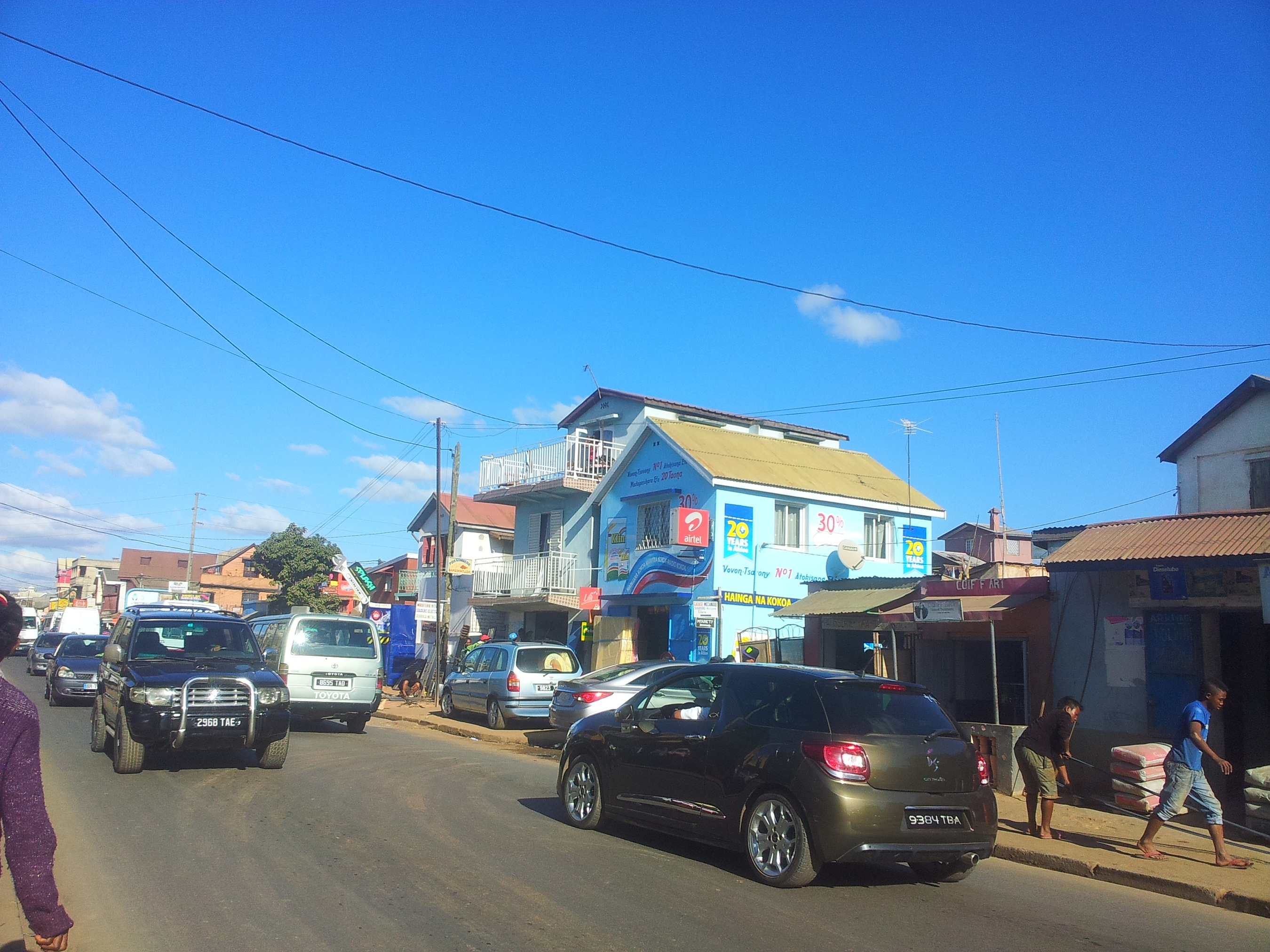
- Talamaty

- Location in Madagascar
- Coordinates: 18°50′S 47°27′E
- Country: Madagascar
- Region: Analamanga
- District: Ambohidratrimo

Area
  - Total: 1,219 km^{2} (471 sq mi)
- Elevation: 1,249 m (4,098 ft)

Population (2008)
  - Total: 44,082
- Time zone: UTC3 (EAT)
- Postal code: 105

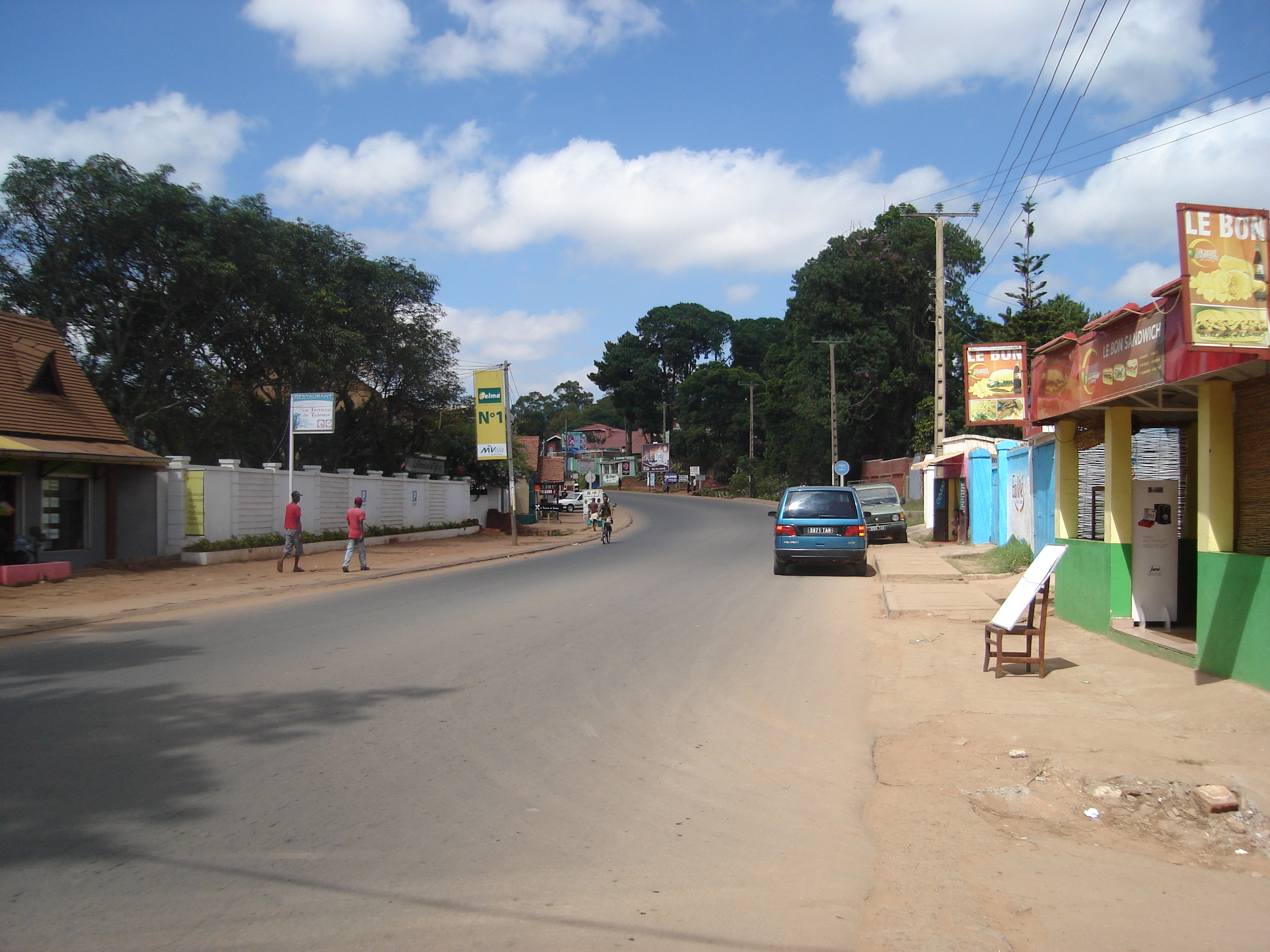
Talatamaty, RN52

Talatamaty is a town in Analamanga Region, in the Central Highlands of Madagascar, located 5 km from the capital of Antananarivo.

The RN 52 runs through this town.
