= Antanetibe, Ambohidratrimo =

Antanetibe
- Location in Madagascar
- Coordinates: 18°47′S 47°25′E
- Country: Madagascar
- Region: Analamanga
- District: Ambohidratrimo (district)

Government
  - Mayor: Louis Firmin Rakotomenjanahary
- Elevation: 1,352 m (4,436 ft)

Population (2019)Census
  - Total: 10,536
- Time zone: UTC3 (EAT)
- Postal code: 105

Antanetibe is a rural municipality in Madagascar at 30 km west of the capital Antananarivo. It belongs to the district of Ambohidratrimo (district), which is a part of Analamanga Region. The population of the commune was 10,536 in 2019.

== Economics ==
The economy is based on agriculture. Antanetibe is known to raise many poultry.

== Ethnics ==
The town is mainly inhabited by the Merina.
