= NAFI =

NAFI may refer to:

== Organizations ==
- National Association of Fire Investigators
- National Association of Flight Instructors (USA)
- North American Forum on Integration (Canada, Mexico, USA

== People ==
- Nafi‘ al-Madani, one of the seven canonical transmitters of Qur'an reading
- Abu Suhail an-Nafi, an Islamic scholar

== See also ==
- Navy, Army and Air Force Institutes (NAAFI) (United Kingdom)
- Nafi (disambiguation)
