= Fetra Ratsimiziva =

Malagasy judoka

Personal information
- Nationality: Malagasy
- Born: 5 August 1991 (age 34) Antananarivo, Madagascar
- Height: 178 cm (5.84 ft)
- Weight: 81 kg (179 lb)

Sport
- Country: Madagascar
- Sport: Judo
- Event: -81 kg
Medal record
Men's Judo
Representing Madagascar
African Games
Bronze medal – third place	2011 Maputo	-81 kg
African Judo Championships
Silver medal – second place	2011 Dakar	-81 kg
Bronze medal – third place	2020 Antananarivo	-81 kg

Fetra Ratsimiziva (born in Antananarivo on 5 August 1991) is a judoka who represented Madagascar at the 2012 Summer Olympics. He was one of three sportspeople on the team to qualify for the Olympics rather than win a wild-card spot. In the Men's 81kg event, he lost to Emmanuel Lucenti of Argentina in the second round.

He won a silver medal at 2011 African Judo Championships, that year he also won a bronze medal at the African Games. In 2020, he won a bronze medal at the African Judo Championships which took place in his homeland.

Olympic Games
Preceded by Jean de Dieu Soloniaina	Flagbearer for Madagascar; 2012 London	Succeeded by Eliane Saholinirina
