= Madagascar at the 2022 Winter Olympics =

- Flag of Madagascar
- IOC code: MAD
- NOC: Comité Olympique Malgache

in Beijing, China 4–20 February 2022
- Competitors: 2 (1 man and 1 woman) in 1 sport
- Flag bearers (opening): Mialitiana Clerc; Mathieu Neumuller
- Flag bearer (closing): Mathieu Neumuller
- Medals: Gold 0 Silver 0 Bronze 0 Total 0

Winter Olympics appearances (overview)
- 2006; 2010–2014; 2018; 2022; 2026; 2030

Madagascar competed at the 2022 Winter Olympics in Beijing, China, from 4 to 20 February 2022.

The Malagasy team consisted of two athletes (one per gender) competing in alpine skiing. Both athletes carried the Malagasy flag during the opening ceremony. Meanwhile alpine skier Mathieu Neumuller was the flagbearer during the closing ceremony.

== Competitors ==
The following is the list of number of competitors participating at the Games per sport/discipline.

Sport	Men	Women	Total
Alpine skiing	1	1	2
Total	1	1	2

== Alpine skiing ==
By meeting the basic qualification standards, Madagascar qualified one male and one female alpine skier.

Athlete	Event	Run 1		Run 2		Total	
Athlete	Event	Time	Rank	Time	Rank	Time	Rank
Mathieu Neumuller	Men's giant slalom	DNF		Did not advance			
Mathieu Neumuller	Men's slalom	1:07.90	48	1:02.88	43	2:10.78	41
Mialitiana Clerc	Women's giant slalom	1:08.71	52	1:07.31	42	2:16.02	41
Mialitiana Clerc	Women's slalom	1:02.22	51	1:00.66	43	2:02.88	43

== See also ==
- Tropical nations at the Winter Olympics
