= Madagascar at the 2026 Winter Olympics =

- Flag of Madagascar
- IOC code: MAD
- NOC: Comité Olympique Malgache

in Milan and Cortina d'Ampezzo, Italy 6 February 2026 – 22 February 2026
- Competitors: 2 (1 man and 1 woman) in 1 sport
- Flag bearers (opening): Mathieu Gravier & Mialitiana Clerc
- Flag bearers (closing): Mathieu Gravier & Mialitiana Clerc
- Medals: Gold 0 Silver 0 Bronze 0 Total 0

Winter Olympics appearances (overview)
- 2006; 2010–2014; 2018; 2022; 2026

Madagascar competed at the 2026 Winter Olympics in Milan and Cortina d'Ampezzo, Italy, from 6 to 22 February 2026.

Alpine skiers Mathieu Gravier and Mialitiana Clerc were the country's flagbearers during the opening ceremony. Meanwhile, the pair were also the country's flagbearer during the closing ceremony.

== Competitors ==
The following is the list of number of competitors participating at the Games per sport/discipline.

Sport	Men	Women	Total
Alpine skiing	1	1	2
Total	1	1	2

== Alpine skiing ==
Madagascar qualified one male and one female alpine skier through the basic quota.

Athlete	Event	Run 1		Run 2		Total	
Athlete	Event	Time	Rank	Time	Rank	Time	Rank
Mathieu Gravier	Men's giant slalom	1:27.86	60	1:20.97	55	2:48.83	57
Mialitiana Clerc	Women's giant slalom	1:12.35	53	1:19.64	50	2:31.99	50
Mialitiana Clerc	Women's slalom	58.97	58	1:03.63	49	2:02.60	49
