= Merimandroso =

- Location in Madagascar
- Coordinates: 18°45′S 47°31′E
- Country: Madagascar
- Region: Analamanga
- District: Ambohidratrimo (district)

Population (2018)
  - Total: 14,545
- Time zone: UTC3 (EAT)
- postal code: 105

Merimandroso is a town and commune in Madagascar. It belongs to the district of Ambohidratrimo, which is a part of Analamanga Region. The population of the commune was estimated to be approximately 14,545 in 2018.
