= Phillip Pipersburg =

Belizean sprinter (1955–2018)

Personal information
- Nationality: Belizean
- Born: 15 May 1955
- Died: 11 April 2018 (aged 62) Santa Barbara, California, U.S.

Sport
- Sport: Sprinting
- Event: 400 metres

Phillip Patrick Gerald Pipersburg (15 May 1955 – 11 April 2018) was a Belizean sprinter. He competed in the men's 400 metres at the 1984 Summer Olympics.

At Santa Barbara High School he finished third place in the "C" Division at the 1971 CIF California State Meet. Running for Santa Barbara City College, he still shares the school records in the 100 meters and 200 meters.

His son, Phillip Jr., was also a top sprinter and played football wide receiver for the University of California.

A fixture of the Santa Barbara community, Pipersburg worked as a probation officer. With his wife Lillian, he served as a foster parent for hundreds of disadvantaged children. Pipersburg suffered from kidney problems, needing dialysis for many years.
