= Édouard Rasoanaivo =

Malagasy middle-distance runner

Personal information
- Nationality: Malagasy
- Born: 20 February 1947 (age 79)

Sport
- Sport: Middle-distance running
- Events: 800 metres 1500 metres

Édouard Rasoanaivo (born 20 February 1947) is a Malagasy middle-distance runner. He competed in the men's 800 metres and 1500 metres at the 1972 Summer Olympics.

Rasoanaivo competed in his 800 m heat in August 1972, one week before his 1500 m competition in September. He ran 1:50.79 for 800 m to place 6th in his heat, followed by running 3:48.45 to place 8th in his 1500 m heat. At another competition that year, Rasoanaivo set his 800 m personal best of 1:49.4.

On 13 January 1973, Rasoanaivo ran 3:44.80 for 1500 m at a meeting in Lagos, Nigeria. His time still stands as the Malagasy national record over the distance.

At the 1990 Indian Ocean Island Games hosted by Madagascar, Rasoanaivo was featured as the final leg of the Games torch relay. His selection was discussed again before the 2007 Games during debates over who the next Malagasy honored athlete should be.

Rasoanaivo played a role in opening up the Malagasy military to compete in competitions organized by the Organisation du sport militaire en Afrique (OSMA) in 2012.
