= Mathieu Razanakolona =

Malagasy-Canadian alpine skier (born 1986)

- Born: 2 August 1986 (age 40); Montreal, Quebec, Canada
- Occupation: skier

Mathieu Razanakolona (born 2 August 1986) is a Malagasy-Canadian alpine skier, born to a Quebecois mother and a father from Madagascar, currently residing in Canada.

He competes in both slalom and giant slalom races. In January 2006 he made his debut in the Alpine skiing World Cup in Schladming, Austria, but he was disqualified from this competition.

He was Madagascar's only representative at the 2006 Winter Olympics, and their first ever Winter Olympics representative. The FIS gave him a wildcard entry into the 2006 Winter Olympics.

Olympic Games
Preceded by Rosa Rakotozafy	Flagbearer for Madagascar; 2006 Turin	Succeeded by Jean de Dieu Soloniaina
