= Ampangabe =

- Location in Madagascar
- Coordinates: 19°07′S 47°31′E
- Country: Madagascar
- Province: Antananarivo
- Region: Analamanga
- District: Ambohidratrimo (district)

Area
  - Total: 92 km^{2} (36 sq mi)
- Elevation: 1,343 m (4,406 ft)

Population
  - Total: 8,235
  - Ethnicities: Merina (90%)
- Time zone: UTC3 (EAT)
- Postal code: 105

Ampangabe is a rural municipality in Madagascar.

== Population ==
The population consists of 90% Merina, 5% Besileo, and 5% Antandroy.

== Agriculture ==
Mainly rice is grown in the town.

== Rivers ==
3 rivers cross the village: Andromba river (west), Sisaony (in the north-east), Ikopa River (northern border).

== Religion ==
69% of the population are Protestants, 25% are Catholic.

== Roads ==
The municipality is linked with the National road 4 by the Provincial road29.
