= Fernand Tovondray =

Malagasy hurdler

Personal information
- Nationality: Malagasy
- Born: Fernand Tovondray; 12 May 1944 (age 82) Beroroha, Madagascar

Sport
- Sport: Athletics
- Events: 110 metres hurdles, high jump

Fernand Tovondray (born 12 May 1944) is a Malagasy high jumper and hurdler. Tovondray would compete at the 1968 Summer Olympics, representing Madagascar in men's athletics. He would be the first Malagasy athlete to represent the nation in the 110 metres hurdles and high jump at an edition of the Olympic Games. Prior to the Summer Games, he would set a high jump personal best.

Tovondray first competed in the heats of the men's 110 metres hurdles. He would place last in his heat and would not advance to the semifinals of the event. He would then compete in the men's high jump but would place 30th in the qualifying round and would not advance to the finals of the event.

== Biography ==
Fernand Tovondray was born on 12 May 1944 in Beroroha, Madagascar. Tovondray would compete at the 1968 Summer Olympics in Mexico City, Mexico, representing Madagascar in men's athletics. He would be the first Malagasy athlete to represent the nation in the 110 metres hurdles and high jump at an edition of the Olympic Games. Prior to the Summer Games, he would set a personal best in the high jump with a height of 2.08 metres in 1967.

Tovondray would first compete in the heats of the men's 110 metres hurdles on 16 October against six other competitors. There, he would be credited with a hand timed time of 14.9 seconds and an automatic time of 15 seconds. In the round, he would place last and would not advance to the semifinals of the event.

Three days later, he would compete in the men's high jump qualification round on 19 October against 38 other competitors. There, he would clear his first attempt at 1.95 metres and would fail his next attempt at 2 metres two times before clearing it on his third. He would then move up to 2.03 metres and would clear it on his first attempt then failed all of his attempts on 2.06 metres. With his highest credited height of 2.03 metres, he would place 30th overall and would not advance to the finals of the event.
