= Madagascar at the 2024 Summer Olympics =

- IOC code: MAD
- NOC: Malagasy Olympic Committee
- Website: www.oceaniasport.com/marshalls

in Paris, France 26 July 2024 – 11 August 2024
- Competitors: 7 (3 men and 4 women) in 5 sports
- Flag bearer: Fabio Rakotoarimanana & Rosina Randafiarison
- Medals: Gold 0 Silver 0 Bronze 0 Total 0

Summer Olympics appearances (overview)
- 1964; 1968; 1972; 1976; 1980; 1984; 1988; 1992; 1996; 2000; 2004; 2008; 2012; 2016; 2020; 2024

Madagascar competed at the 2024 Summer Olympics in Paris from July 26 to August 11, 2024. It was the nation's fourteenth consecutive appearance at the Summer Olympics.

== Competitors ==
The following is the list of the numbers of competitors in the Games. Note that reserves in football are not counted:

Sport	Men	Women	Total
Athletics	1	1	2
Judo	0	1	1
Swimming	1	1	2
Table tennis	1	0	1
Weightlifting	0	1	1
Total	3	4	7

== Athletics ==
Malagasy track and field athletes achieved entry standards for Paris 2024 by world ranking, in the following events (a maximum of 3 athletes each):

Key

- Note–Ranks given for track events are within the athlete's heat only
- Q = Qualified for the next round
- q = Qualified for the next round as the fastest loser or, in field events, by position without achieving the qualifying target
- NR = National record
- N/A = Round not applicable for the event
- Bye = Athlete not required to compete in round

Track and road events

Athlete	Event	Preliminaries		Heat		Repechage		Semifinal		Final	
Athlete	Event	Result	Rank	Result	Rank	Result	Rank	Result	Rank	Result	Rank
Rija Vatomanga Gardiner	Men's 100 m	10.82 PB	6	Did not advance							
Sidonie Fiadanantsoa	Women's 100 m hurdles	—		12.92	5	13.12	6	Did not advance			

== Judo ==
Madagascar qualified one judoka for the Games. Aina Rasoanaivo Razafy (women's middleweight, 70 kg), qualified via the continental quota, based on Olympic point rankings.

Athlete	Event	Round of 32	Round of 16	Quarterfinals	Semifinals	Repechage	Final / BM	
Athlete	Event	Opposition Result	Opposition Result	Opposition Result	Opposition Result	Opposition Result	Opposition Result	Rank
Aina Rasoanaivo Razafy	Women's –70 kg	Yeats-Brown (GBR); L 00–01	Did not advance					

== Swimming ==
Madagascar sent two swimmers to compete at the 2024 Paris Olympics.

Athlete	Event	Heat		Semifinal		Final	
Athlete	Event	Time	Rank	Time	Rank	Time	Rank
Jonathan Raharvel	Men's 100 m breaststroke	1:05.20	33	Did not advance			
Antsa Rabejaona	Women's 50 m freestyle	27.12	39	Did not advance			

== Table tennis ==
Madagascar entered one table tennis player for Paris 2024. Fabio Rakotoarimanana qualified after winning the second available quota places at the 2024 African Qualification Tournament in Kigali, Rwanda. This was Madagascar's the first Olympic appearance in this sports.

Athlete	Event	Preliminary	Round 1	Round 2	Round 3	Round of 16	Quarterfinals	Semifinals	Final / BM	
Athlete	Event	Opposition Result	Opposition Result	Opposition Result	Opposition Result	Opposition Result	Opposition Result	Opposition Result	Opposition Result	Rank
Fabio Rakotoarimanana	Men's singles	Bye	Assar (EGY); L 1–4	Did not advance						

== Weightlifting ==
Madagascar entered one weightlifter into the Olympic competition. Rosina Randafiarison (women's 49 kg), secured one of the top ten slots in her weight divisions based on the IWF Olympic Qualification Rankings.

Athlete	Event	Snatch		Clean & Jerk		Total	Rank
Athlete	Event	Result	Rank	Result	Rank	Total	Rank
Rosina Randafiarison	Women's −49 kg	80	10	100	10	180	10
