= Madagascar at the 2016 Summer Olympics =

- IOC code: MAD
- NOC: Malagasy Olympic Committee

in Rio de Janeiro
- Competitors: 6 in 4 sports
- Flag bearer: Eliane Saholinirina
- Medals: Gold 0 Silver 0 Bronze 0 Total 0

Summer Olympics appearances (overview)
- 1964; 1968; 1972; 1976; 1980; 1984; 1988; 1992; 1996; 2000; 2004; 2008; 2012; 2016; 2020; 2024

Madagascar competed at the 2016 Summer Olympics in Rio de Janeiro, Brazil, from 5 to 21 August 2016. This was the nation's twelfth appearance at the Summer Olympics, with the exception of the 1976 Summer Olympics in Montreal and the 1988 Summer Olympics in Seoul, because of the African and North Korean boycott, respectively.

Malagasy Olympic Committee (French: Comité Olympique Malgache) sent a total of six athletes, two men and four women, to compete in four sports at the Games. The nation's roster was relatively smaller than those sent to London 2012 by a single athlete, with the women outnumbering the men for the third consecutive time.

The Malagasy team featured three returning Olympians from the previous Games: freestyle swimmer Estellah Fils Rabetsara, hurdler Ali Kame, and steeplechase runner Eliane Saholinirina. Judoka Asaramanitra Ratiarison was originally selected to carry the Madagascar flag, but declined to do so due to her competition schedule on the first day of the Games. Instead, Saholinirina took the vacant spot previously held by Ratiarison to lead her team in the opening ceremony. Madagascar, however, has yet to win its first ever Olympic medal.

== Athletics ==
Malagasy athletes have so far achieved qualifying standards in the following athletics events (up to a maximum of 3 athletes in each event):

Key

- Note–Ranks given for track events are within the athlete's heat only
- Q = Qualified for the next round
- q = Qualified for the next round as a fastest loser or, in field events, by position without achieving the qualifying target
- NR = National record
- N/A = Round not applicable for the event
- Bye = Athlete not required to compete in round

Track & road events

Athlete	Event	Heat		Semifinal		Final	
Athlete	Event	Result	Rank	Result	Rank	Result	Rank
Ali Kame	Men's 110 m hurdles	DNS		Did not advance			
Eliane Saholinirina	Women's 3000 m steeplechase	9:45.92	11	—		Did not advance	

== Judo ==
Madagascar has qualified one judoka for the women's extra-lightweight category (48 kg) at the Games. Asaramanitra Ratiarison earned a continental quota spot from the Africa region as Madagascar's top-ranked judoka outside of direct qualifying position in the IJF World Ranking List of May 30, 2016.

Athlete	Event	Round of 32	Round of 16	Quarterfinals	Semifinals	Repechage	Final / BM	
Athlete	Event	Opposition Result	Opposition Result	Opposition Result	Opposition Result	Opposition Result	Opposition Result	Rank
Asaramanitra Ratiarison	Women's −48 kg	Mestre (CUB); L 000–000 S	Did not advance					

== Swimming ==
Madagascar has received a Universality invitation from FINA to send two swimmers (one male and one female) to the Olympics.

Athlete	Event	Heat		Semifinal		Final	
Athlete	Event	Time	Rank	Time	Rank	Time	Rank
Anthonny Sitraka Ralefy	Men's 100 m butterfly	54.72	37	Did not advance			
Estellah Fils Rabetsara	Women's 100 m freestyle	1:01.11	44	Did not advance			

== Weightlifting ==
Madagascar has received an invitation from the Tripartite Commission to send Elisa Ravololoniaina in the women's middleweight category (63 kg) to the Olympics.

Athlete	Event	Snatch		Clean & jerk		Total	Rank
Athlete	Event	Result	Rank	Result	Rank	Total	Rank
Elisa Ravololoniaina	Women's −63 kg	85	11	100	12	185	12
