= Anosiala, Ambohidratrimo =

Anosiala
- Location in Madagascar
- Coordinates: 18°47′S 47°25′E
- Country: Madagascar
- Region: Analamanga
- District: Ambohidratrimo (district)
- Elevation: 1,376 m (4,514 ft)

Population (2019)
  - Total: 36,863
- Time zone: UTC3 (EAT)
- Postal code: 105

Anosiala is a rural municipality in Madagascar. It belongs to the district of Ambohidratrimo, which is a part of Analamanga Region. The population of the commune was 36,863 in 2019.

== Ethnics ==
The town is inhabited by the Merina.
