= Iarinarivo =

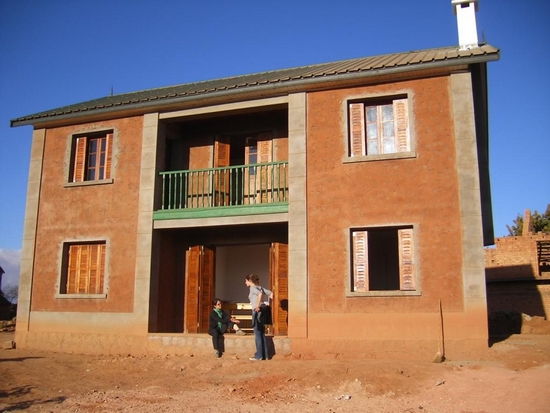
- in Tanjondroa, a fokontany of Iarinarivo

- Location in Madagascar
- Coordinates: 18°55′S 47°24′E
- Country: Madagascar
- Region: Analamanga
- District: Ambohidratrimo (district)

Area
  - Total: 24.5 km^{2} (9.5 sq mi)

Population
  - Total: 12,000
- Time zone: UTC3 (EAT)

Iarinarivo is a rural municipality in Madagascar. It belongs to the district of Ambohidratrimo (district), which is a part of Analamanga Region. The population of the commune was estimated to be approximately 12,000.
