= Ambohimanjaka =

- Location in Madagascar
- Coordinates: 18°43′S 47°25′E
- Country: Madagascar
- Region: Analamanga
- District: Ambohidratrimo (district)
- Elevation: 1,249 m (4,098 ft)

Population (2018)
  - Total: 5,284
- Time zone: UTC3 (EAT)
- postal code: 105

Ambohimanjaka is a town and commune in Madagascar. It belongs to the district of Ambohidratrimo (district), which is a part of Analamanga Region. It lies North West from the capital Antananarivo. The population of the commune was estimated to be approximately 5,284 in 2018.

== References and notes ==
- Monographie Region Analamanga
