= Madagascar at the 2000 Summer Olympics =

- IOC code: MAD
- NOC: Malagasy Olympic Committee

in Sydney
- Competitors: 11 in 4 sports
- Flag bearer: Joseph-Berlioz Randriamihaja
- Medals: Gold 0 Silver 0 Bronze 0 Total 0

Summer Olympics appearances (overview)
- 1964; 1968; 1972; 1976; 1980; 1984; 1988; 1992; 1996; 2000; 2004; 2008; 2012; 2016; 2020; 2024

Madagascar competed at the 2000 Summer Olympics in Sydney, Australia.

== Competitors ==
The following is the list of number of competitors in the Games.

| Sport | Men | Women | Total |
|---|---|---|---|
| Athletics | 3 | 4 | 7 |
| Boxing | 1 | – | 1 |
| Judo | 0 | 1 | 1 |
| Swimming | 1 | 1 | 2 |
| Total | 5 | 6 | 11 |

== Athletics ==
Key

- Note–Ranks given for track events are within the athlete's heat only
- Q = Qualified for the next round
- q = Qualified for the next round as a fastest loser or, in field events, by position without achieving the qualifying target
- NR = National record
- N/A = Round not applicable for the event
- Bye = Athlete not required to compete in round

Men
Track and road events

| Athletes | Events | Heat Round 1 | | Heat Round 2 | | Semifinal | | Final | |
| Athletes | Events | Time | Rank | Time | Rank | Time | Rank | Time | Rank |
|---|---|---|---|---|---|---|---|---|---|
| Jean Randriamamitiana | 100 metres | 12.50 | 93 | did not advance | | | | | |
| Joseph-Berlioz Randriamihaja | 110 metres hurdles | 13.86 | 26 q | 14.07 | 28 | did not advance | | | |
| Yvon Rakotoarimiandry | 400 metres hurdles | 50.15 | 27 | —N/a | | did not advance | | | |

Women
Track and road events

| Athletes | Events | Heat Round 1 | | Heat Round 2 | | Semifinal | | Final | |
| Athletes | Events | Time | Rank | Time | Rank | Time | Rank | Time | Rank |
|---|---|---|---|---|---|---|---|---|---|
| Hanitriniaina Rakotondrabé | 100 metres | 11.50 | 29 Q | 11.51 | 23 | did not advance | | | |
| Rosa Rakotozafy | 100 metres hurdles | 13.80 | 34 | did not advance | | | | | |
| Monica Rahanitraniriana; Ony Paule Ratsimbazafy; Rosa Rakotozafy; Hanitriniaina Rakotondrabé | 4 × 100 metres relay | 43.61 | 11 q | —N/a | | 43.98 | 14 | did not advance | |

== Boxing ==
Men

| Athlete | Event | Round of 32 | Round of 16 | Quarterfinals | Semifinals | Final | |
| Athlete | Event | Opposition Result | Opposition Result | Opposition Result | Opposition Result | Opposition Result | Rank |
|---|---|---|---|---|---|---|---|
| Celestin Augustin | Flyweight | Rżany (POL); L 13–15 | did not advance | | | | |

== Judo ==
Women

| Athlete | Event | Round of 32 | Round of 16 | Quarterfinals | Semifinals | Repechage 1 | Repechage 2 | Repechage 3 | Final / BM | |
| Athlete | Event | Opposition Result | Opposition Result | Opposition Result | Opposition Result | Opposition Result | Opposition Result | Opposition Result | Opposition Result | Rank |
|---|---|---|---|---|---|---|---|---|---|---|
| Naina Ravaoarisoa | −52 kg | Shih (TPE); L | did not advance | | | | | | | |

== Swimming ==
Men

| Athlete | Event | Heat | | Semifinal | | Final | |
| Athlete | Event | Time | Rank | Time | Rank | Time | Rank |
|---|---|---|---|---|---|---|---|
| Jean-Luc Razakarivony | 100 m breaststroke | 1:05.97 | 55 | did not advance | | | |

Women

| Athlete | Event | Heat | | Semifinal | | Final | |
| Athlete | Event | Time | Rank | Time | Rank | Time | Rank |
|---|---|---|---|---|---|---|---|
| Mbolatiana Ramanisa | 50 m freestyle | 29.20 | 61 | did not advance | | | |

== See also ==
- Madagascar at the 2000 Summer Paralympics

== Sources ==
- Wallechinsky, David (2004). The Complete Book of the Summer Olympics (Athens 2004 Edition). Toronto, Canada. ISBN 1-894963-32-6.
- International Olympic Committee (2001). The Results. Retrieved 12 November 2005.
- Sydney Organising Committee for the Olympic Games (2001). Official Report of the XXVII Olympiad Volume 1: Preparing for the Games. Retrieved 20 November 2005.
- Sydney Organising Committee for the Olympic Games (2001). Official Report of the XXVII Olympiad Volume 2: Celebrating the Games. Retrieved 20 November 2005.
- Sydney Organising Committee for the Olympic Games (2001). The Results. Retrieved 20 November 2005.
- International Olympic Committee Web Site
