= Mahereza =

- Location in Madagascar
- Coordinates: 18°53′00″S 47°21′00″E
- Country: Madagascar
- Region: Analamanga
- District: Ambohidratrimo (district)

Population (2019)census
  - Total: 3,570
- Time zone: UTC3 (EAT)
- postal code: 105

Mahereza is a rural municipality in Madagascar. It belongs to the district of Ambohidratrimo (district), which is a part of Analamanga Region.
