= Ambohidratrimo District =

Ambohidratrimo
- District
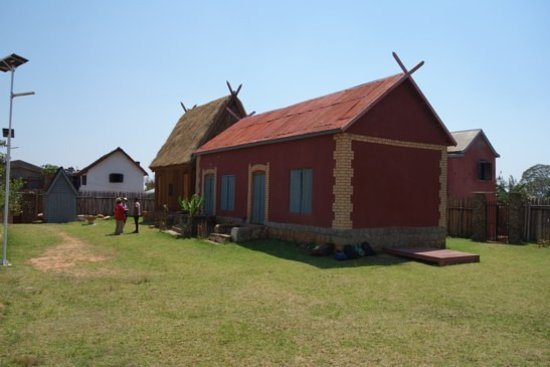
- Rova Ambohidratimo

- Location within Madagascar
- Coordinates: 18°49′S 47°26′E
- Country: Madagascar
- Region: Analamanga

Area
  - Total: 1,415 km^{2} (546 sq mi)
- Elevation: 1,362 m (4,469 ft)

Population (2020)
  - Total: 470,221
  - Density: 332.3/km^{2} (860.7/sq mi)

Ambohidratrimo is a district of Analamanga in Madagascar. The district has an area of 1,415 km^{2} (546 sq mi), and the estimated population in 2020 was 470,221.

== Communes ==
The district is further divided into 24 communes:

- Ambato
- Ambatolampy Tsimahafotsy
- Ambohidratrimo
- Ambohimanjaka
- Ambohipihaonana
- Ambohitrimanjaka
- Ampangabe
- Ampanotokana
- Anjanadoria
- Anosiala
- Antanetibe
- Antehiroka
- Antsahafilo
- Avaratsena
- Fiadanana
- Iarinarivo
- Ivato
- Ivato Firaisana
- Mahabo
- Mahereza
- Mahitsy
- Mananjara
- Manjakavaradrano
- Merimandroso
- Talatamaty
