= Ambatolampy Tsimahafotsy =

- Location in Madagascar
- Coordinates: 18°48′S 47°31′E
- Country: Madagascar
- Region: Analamanga
- District: Ambohidratrimo

Area
  - Total: 35 km^{2} (14 sq mi)
- Elevation: 1,270–1,350 m (4,170–4,430 ft)

Population (2015)
  - Total: 13,424
- Time zone: UTC3 (EAT)

Ambatolampy Tsimahafotsy is a town in Analamanga Region, in the Central Highlands of Madagascar, located at 16 km from the capital of Antananarivo.

== Education ==
In the commune are located:

- 5 primary schools
- 1 college
- 10 private schools
