= Alonzo Babers =

American sprinter (born 1961)

Alonzo C. Babers
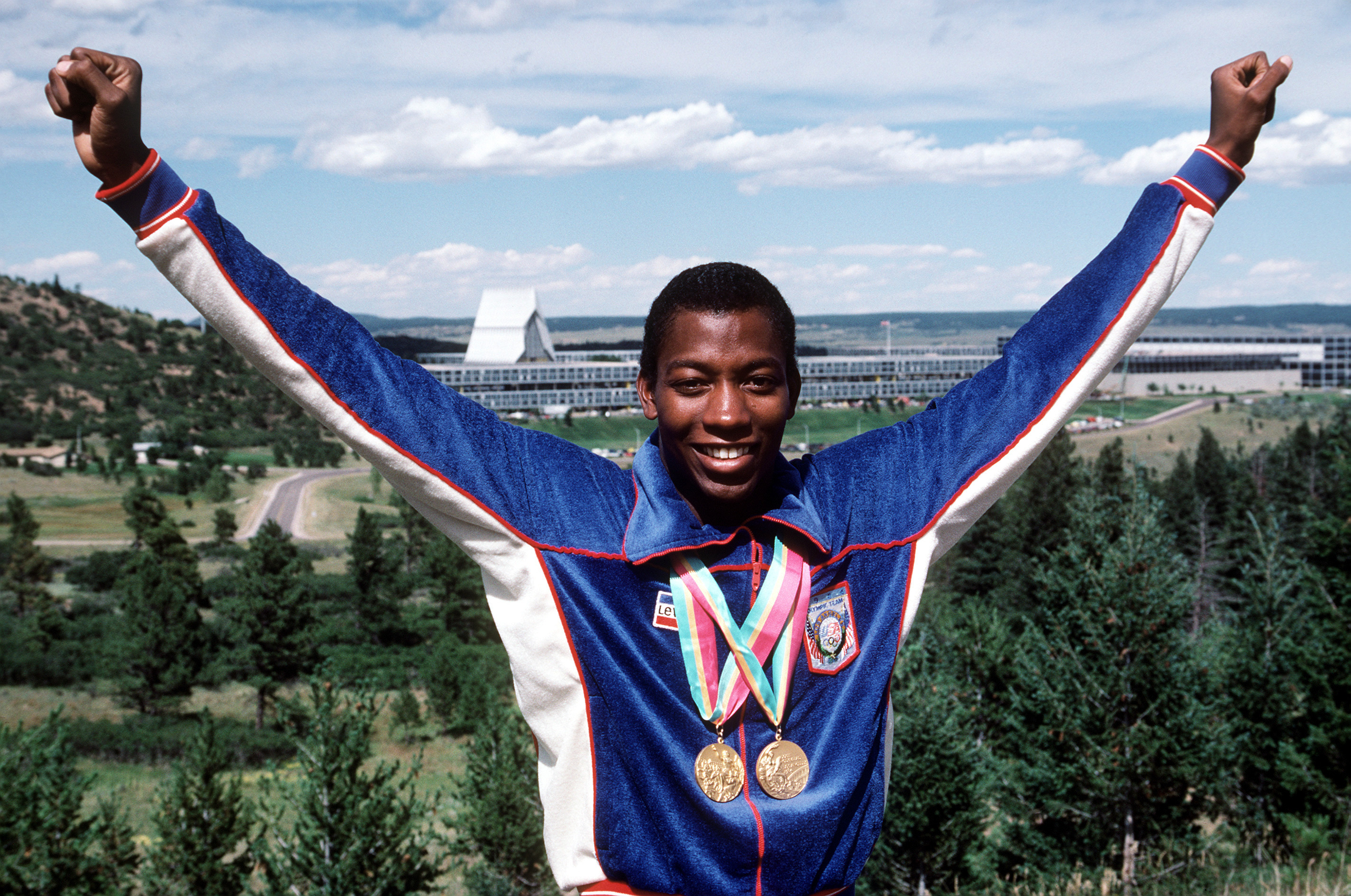
- Babers in 1984

Personal information
- Born: October 31, 1961 (age 65) Montgomery, Alabama, U.S.
Medal record
Men's athletics
Representing the United States
Olympic Games
Gold medal – first place	1984 Los Angeles	400 m
Gold medal – first place	1984 Los Angeles	4 × 400 m relay
Pan American Games
Gold medal – first place	1983 Caracas	4 x 400 m relay
Summer Universiade
Gold medal – first place	1983 Edmonton	4 x 400 m relay

Alonzo Carl Babers (born October 31, 1961) is an American former athlete, winner of two gold medals at the 1984 Summer Olympics, in the 400 m and the 4 × 400 m relay.

Born in Montgomery, Alabama, Alonzo Babers was a military dependent who graduated from Kaiserslautern American High School in West Germany. He attended the United States Air Force Academy from 1979 to 1983, graduating with a major in aerospace engineering, where he ran track and played one season of football.

The international athletics career of Alonzo Babers consisted of a spectacular rise to fame, followed by a decisive and abrupt end. Up to the end of 1982, Babers's best time in 400 m was 45.9, but he rapidly improved on that during 1983, running a best time of 45.07, but at the 1983 World Championships in Helsinki he finished in a disappointing sixth place in the 4 × 400 m relay.

Babers continued his rapid improvement in 1984. At the USA Final Olympic Trials in Los Angeles, he won his semi-final in a personal best of 44.95. Later, in the final, he ran another personal best of 44.86 to qualify to the Olympic team. At the Los Angeles Olympic Games he further lowered his personal best to 44.75 when he won his quarterfinal. In the Olympic final, Babers ran 44.27 to win the gold medal. In the 4 × 400 m relay, United States (Babers ran the third leg) won the gold medal easily in 2:57.91.

While training for and competing in the 1984 Olympics, Babers held the rank of lieutenant in the United States Air Force. Just one month after his double-gold performance in Los Angeles, Babers reported to flight training school and began his career as a pilot, so his athletics career was over. He was an active-duty officer in the United States Air Force from 1983 to 1991 and continues to serve as a member of the Air Force Reserves. He later became a Boeing 777 captain for United Airlines.
