= Nathalia Rakotondramanana =

Malagasy weightlifter

Personal information
- Born: January 15, 1989 (age 37) Antananarivo, Madagascar
- Height: 1.58 m (5 ft 2 in)
- Weight: 48 kg (106 lb)

Sport
- Country: Madagascar
- Sport: Weightlifting
- Event: 48kg
- Updated on 25 July 2012

Harinelina Nathalia Rakotondramanana (born 15 January 1989, in Antananarivo) is a weightlifter. She represented Madagascar at the 2012 Summer Olympics held in London, United Kingdom. She is one of three sportspeople on the team to qualify for the Olympics rather than win a wild-card spot. She is also only the second Olympic weightlifter to represent her country. She ultimately finished last place in the 48 kilogram weight class.
