= Ambohipihaonana, Ambohidratrimo =

Ambohipihaonana
- Location in Madagascar
- Coordinates: 18°41′S 47°34′E
- Country: Madagascar
- Region: Analamanga
- District: Ambohidratrimo (district)

Government
  - Mayor: Jean Marie Eusèbe RAFALIMANANA

Area
  - Total: 52 km^{2} (20 sq mi)
- Elevation: 1,250 m (4,100 ft)

Population (2013)
  - Total: 5,703
- Time zone: UTC3 (EAT)
- Postal code: 105

Ambohipihaonana is a rural municipality in Madagascar. It belongs to the district of Ambohidratrimo (district), which is a part of Analamanga Region. The population of the municipality was 5703 inhabitants.
