= Anjanadoria =

- Location in Madagascar
- Coordinates: 18°38′S 47°36′E
- Country: Madagascar
- Region: Analamanga
- District: Ambohidratrimo (district)

Area
  - Total: 292 km^{2} (113 sq mi)

Population (2019)Census 2019
  - Total: 7,602
- Time zone: UTC3 (EAT)

Anjanadoria is a town and commune in Madagascar. It belongs to the district of Ambohidratrimo (district), which is a part of Analamanga Region. About 60 km north of the capital Antananarivo, its population was estimated to be approximately 7,602.
