= Ambohitrimanjaka =

- District
- Location in Madagascar
- Coordinates: 18°52′S 47°26′E
- Country: Madagascar
- Region: Analamanga
- District: Ambohidratrimo (district)

Government
  - Mayor: Ihajasoa Randrimanalintsoa

Area
  - Total: 21,765 km^{2} (8,404 sq mi)
- Elevation: 1,249 m (4,098 ft)

Population (2018)
  - Total: 41,604
- Time zone: UTC3 (EAT)
- Postal code: 105

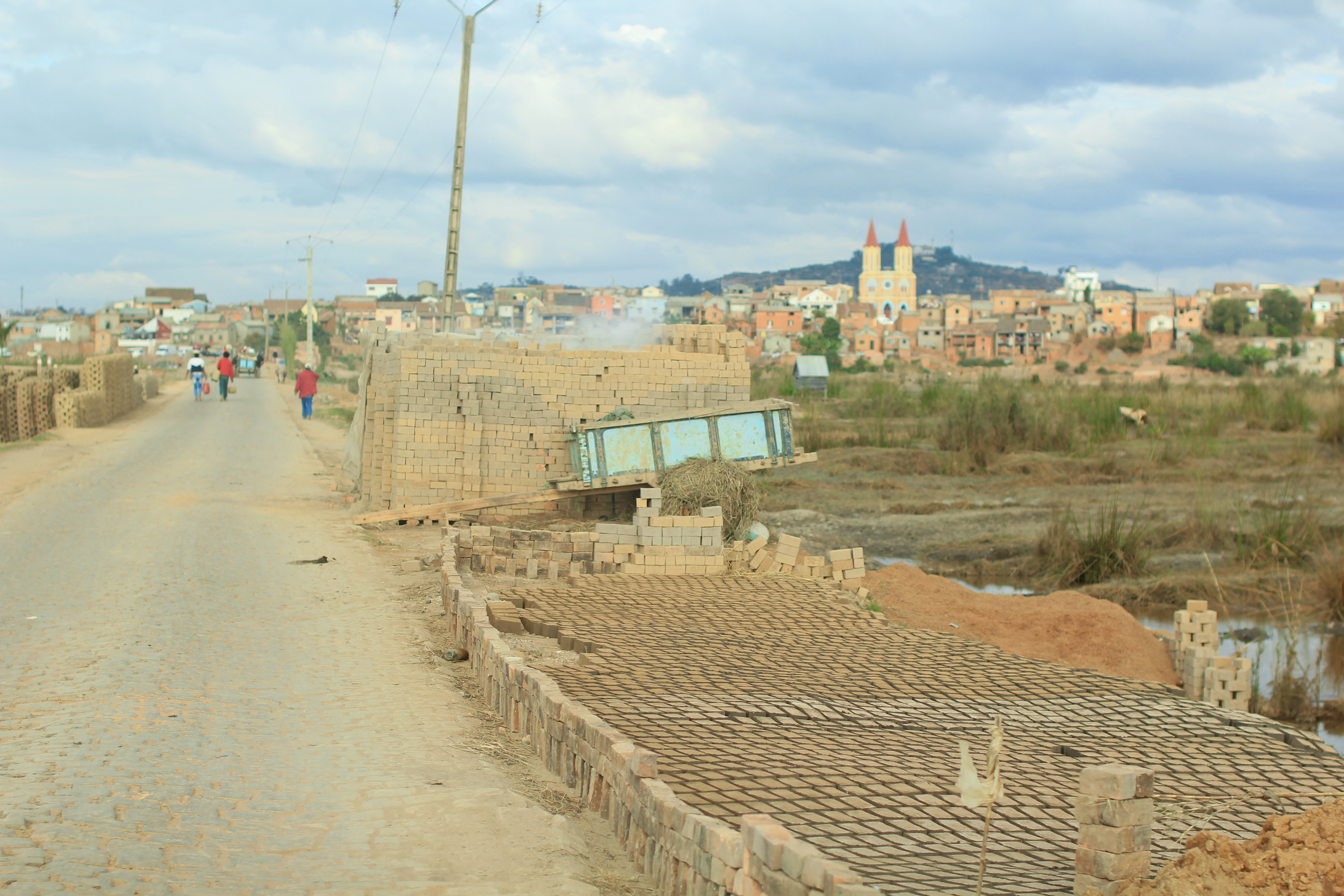
Ambohitrimanjaka, 2023

Ambohitrimanjaka is a municipality in Madagascar. It belongs to the district of Ambohidratrimo (district), which is a part of Analamanga Region. It lies about 12 km West from the capital Antananarivo. It is well known for its manufacture of bricks, its fish, ducks and rice.

The population of the commune was estimated to be approximately 41,604 in 2018.

== Roads ==
The National road RN4 and the Provincial Road 29.

== Rivers ==
Two rivers cross the commune: Sisaony in the South and South-West and Ikopa River in the East.

== Fady (taboos) ==
- Prohibition of contacting round objects (balls, etc) during the maturity of the rice.
- Prohibition of culture of onions.
- Prohibition of Goat herding.

The Zanadranavalona of Anosimanjaka also feast the Alahamadibe (or: Fandroana or Asaramanitra) which is the Malagasy New Year after the astrology of the elders.

== Villages ==
25 fokontany (villages) belong to this municipality of which 24 are connected to the electric grid of Jirama.

== Industry ==
In the village of Anosimanjaka which is part of this municipality is situated a poultry slaughterhouse since 2022.
