= Nafi Mersal =

Egyptian sprinter

Personal information
- Nationality: Egyptian
- Born: 27 July 1960
- Died: 23 October 2006 (aged 46)

Sport
- Sport: Sprinting
- Event: 400 metres

Nafi Mersal (27 July 1960 – 23 October 2006) was an Egyptian sprinter. He competed in the men's 400 metres at the 1984 Summer Olympics.
