= Zoë Andrianifaha =

Malagasy swimmer (born 1965)

Personal information
- Nationality: Madagascar
- Born: 8 September 1965 (age 60)
- Height: 165 cm (5 ft 5 in)
- Weight: 61 kg (134 lb)

Sport
- Sport: Swimming
- Strokes: freestyle breaststroke butterfly

Zoë Andrianifaha (born 8 September 1965) is a Malagasy swimmer who competed in freestyle, breaststroke and butterfly events.

He is listed as the best Malagasy swimmer of all time. He competed in three events at the 1980 Summer Olympics.

Andrianifaha featured as himself in one episode of the television mini series “Moscow 1980: Games of the XXII Olympiad”.
