= Arsène Randriamahazomana =

Malagasy sprinter

Personal information
- Nationality: Malagasy
- Born: 13 August 1961

Sport
- Sport: Sprinting
- Event: 400 metres
Medal record
Men's athletics
Representing Madagascar
Indian Ocean Island Games
Gold medal – first place	1985 Curepipe	400 m
Gold medal – first place	1985 Curepipe	4 × 400 m relay
Gold medal – first place	1990 Antananarivo	400 m
Silver medal – second place	1990 Antananarivo	200 m
Silver medal – second place	1990 Antananarivo	4 × 400 m relay

Arsène Randriamahazomana (13 August 1961 – date of death unknown) was a Malagasy sprinter. He competed in the men's 400 metres at the 1984 Summer Olympics.

At the 1984 Olympics, Randriamahazomana was seeded in the 9th 400 m heat. He ran 48.86 seconds to place 8th, not high enough to advance to the semi-finals. Randriamahazomana was nonetheless widely noticed in American media, as his name was described as a "mouthful" and a struggle for TV announcers to pronounce.

Randriamahazomana won his first international medals at the 1985 Indian Ocean Island Games in Curepipe. He won both the 400 m and 4 × 400 m relay for Madagascar, setting all-time championship records in both events.

He went on to win four Malagasy Athletics Championships titles. At the 1987 championships, Randriamahazomana doubled in both the 200 m and 400 m and won both events, while the following two years he repeated as 400 m champion.

At the next Indian Ocean Island Games edition in 1990, Randriamahazomana won three more medals. Randriamahazomana won silver medals in the 200 m and 4 × 400 m relay, running 21.56 and 3:10.38 respectively. He also broke his own championship record in the 400 m, running 46.95 seconds.

Midi Madagasikara reported that Randriamahazomana died some time between 1990 and 2015.
