= Jean de Dieu Soloniaina =

Malagasy boxer (born 1974)

Jean de Dieu Soloniaina Razanadrakoto (born 26 February 1974) is an amateur boxer from Madagascar who qualified for the 2008 Olympics at lightweight at the 2nd AIBA African 2008 Olympic Qualifying Tournament.

He defeated, among others, Achille Apie, in the Olympic qualification trials and, in the final, he won against Rasheed Lawal 9:2. He lost his Olympic debut to Francisco Vargas of Mexico.

Olympic Games
Preceded by Mathieu Razanakolona	Flagbearer for Madagascar; 2008 Beijing	Succeeded by Fetra Ratsimiziva
