= Madagascar at the 2018 Winter Olympics =

- Flag of Madagascar
- IOC code: MAD
- NOC: Comité Olympique Malgache

in Pyeongchang, South Korea 9–25 February 2018
- Competitors: 1 in 1 sport
- Flag bearer: Mialitiana Clerc
- Medals: Gold 0 Silver 0 Bronze 0 Total 0

Winter Olympics appearances (overview)
- 2006; 2010–2014; 2018; 2022; 2026

Madagascar competed at the 2018 Winter Olympics in Pyeongchang, South Korea, from 9 to 25 February 2018, with one competitor. The country returned to the Winter Olympics after last competing in 2006, which also marked its debut.

PyeongChang 2018 marked the first time the Malagasy Olympic team competed in South Korea as Madagascar did not attend the 1988 Summer Olympics in Seoul due to financial reasons.

== Competitors ==
The following is the list of number of competitors participating in the Malagasy delegation per sport.

Sport	Men	Women	Total
Alpine skiing	0	1	1
Total	0	1	1

== Alpine skiing ==
Madagascar qualified one female athlete, Mialitiana Clerc. Clerc was born in Madagascar, and was adopted by a French family at the age of one. She learned to ski in France. Clerc became the first female Malagasy athlete to compete at the Winter Olympics.

Athlete	Event	Run 1		Run 2		Total	
Athlete	Event	Time	Rank	Time	Rank	Time	Rank
Mialitiana Clerc	Women's giant slalom	1:21.82	55	1:17.18	42	2:39.00	48
Mialitiana Clerc	Women's slalom	1:01.24	53	59.03	48	2:00.27	47

== See also ==
- Madagascar at the 2018 Summer Youth Olympics
