= Madagascar at the 2006 Winter Olympics =

- IOC code: MAD
- NOC: Comité Olympique Malgache

in Turin
- Competitors: 1 (1 man) in 1 sport
- Flag bearers: Mathieu Razanakolona (opening and closing)
- Medals: Gold 0 Silver 0 Bronze 0 Total 0

Winter Olympics appearances (overview)
- 2006; 2010–2014; 2018; 2022; 2026

Madagascar competed in the 2006 Winter Olympics in Turin, Italy. The country's participation at the Games marked its Winter Olympics debut, although it had competed in the Summer Olympics since 1964. The delegation consisted of a single alpine skier, Mathieu Razanakolona, who did not win any medals.

== Background ==
Madagascar first competed at the Summer Olympics at the 1964 Games in Tokyo, Japan. They participated on nine occasions prior to the 2006 Winter Olympics, where they made their Winter Olympics debut in Turin, Italy. They sent a single alpine skier, Mathieu Razanakolona.

Razanakolona was born in Quebec, Canada; his mother was Canadian but his father was from Madagascar. He and his brother Philippe sought to bring international attention to the African island nation of Madagascar by having Mathieu become the first person to represent the country at the Winter Olympics. While Mathieu competed in the skiing, Philippe ran the non-profit organisation rAzAlpin.org to support this. Prior to the Turin Games, Mathieu had competed in a single FIS Alpine Ski World Cup event in Schladming, Austria, where he was disqualified after straddling a gate.

== Alpine skiing ==
The sole Malagasy athlete at the Games, Mathieu Razanakolona, competed in the men's giant slalom and slalom. He was the flag bearer at both the opening and closing ceremonies.

Competing in the giant slalom on 20 February, he finished his first run in a time of one minute and 39.1 seconds, placing him in 43rd place out of the 47 skiers who completed the run. His second run of the day saw an improvement in both time and placement, finishing in 31st place with a time of one minute and 27.33 seconds. This placed him in 39th place overall, with a combined time of three minutes and 6.43 seconds, only ahead of China's Li Guangxu and Ivan Borisov of Kyrgyzstan. However, his slalom competition was not as successful, as he failed to finish his first run, thus eliminating himself from the competition.

Alpine skiing

Athlete	Event	Final				
Athlete	Event	Run 1	Run 2	Run 3	Total	Rank
Mathieu Razanakolona	Men's giant slalom	1:39.10	1:27.33	n/a	3:06.43	39
Mathieu Razanakolona	Men's slalom	did not finish				
