= Damiella Nomenjanahary =

Malagasy judoka

Personal information
- Full name: Damiella Nomenjanahary
- Born: June 22, 1997 (age 29)

Damiella Nomenjanahary (born 22 June 1997) is a Malagasy judoka.

== Career ==
Nomenjanahary competed at the 2021 World Judo Championships in Budapest in the 63kg category, but lost to Sandrine Billiet of Cape Verde. Only 2 slots were available for African women at the 2020 Summer Games 63kg category, and Nomenjanahary amassed enough ranking points to qualify for the games behind Billiet as the continent's number two despite the Nigerian judoka association initially announcing Enku Ewa Ekuta had been selected in February 2021. She was selected for the honour to be a Madagascan flag bearer at the opening ceremony in Tokyo. She was drawn to compete against Maria Centracchio who won the contest.

Olympic Games
Preceded by Mialitiana Clerc	Flag bearer for Madagascar; Tokyo 2020 with Éric Andriantsitohaina	Succeeded by Mialitiana Clerc; Mathieu Neumuller
