= Mahabo, Ambohidratrimo =

Mahabo (Anbohidratrimo)
- Location in Madagascar
- Country: Madagascar
- Region: Analamanga
- District: Ambohidratrimo (district)
- Elevation: 1,380 m (4,530 ft)

Population (2018)
  - Total: 6,994
- Time zone: UTC3 (EAT)
- postal code: 105

Mahabo is a town and commune in Madagascar. It belongs to the district of Ambohidratrimo, which is a part of Analamanga Region.

It is situated at 48 km northwest of the capital Antananarivo at the National Road 4. The population of the commune was estimated to be 6,994 in 2018.

== References and notes ==
- Monographie Region Analamanga
