= Mahitsy =

- town
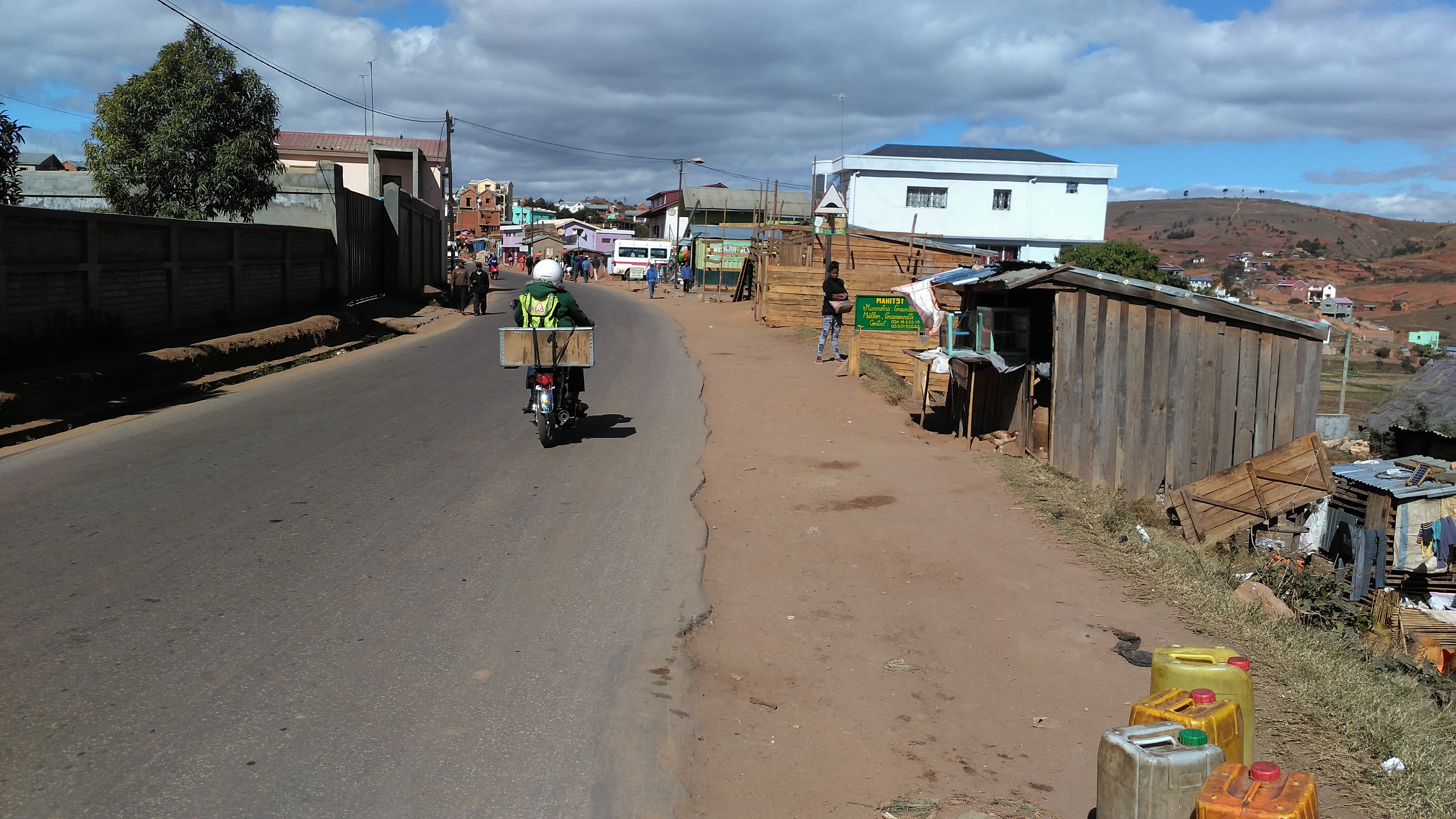
- Mahitsy, RN4

- Location in Madagascar
- Coordinates: 18°45′S 47°21′E
- Country: Madagascar
- Region: Analamanga
- District: Ambohidratrimo
- Elevation: 1,143–1,540 m (3,750–5,052 ft)

Population (2001)
  - Total: 26,056

Mahitsy is rural municipality in Analamanga Region, in the Central Highlands of Madagascar. In the 2001 census, it had a population of 26,056.

Mahitsy is localized at the RN 4 from Antananrivo to Mahajanga.

== Economy ==
About 40% of the eggs consumed in Madagascar are from farms of the surroundings of Mahitsy.

== Infrastructure ==
There is a hydroelectric power plant near Mahitsy on the Farahantsana river. It has a capacity of 28MW.
