= Avaratsena =

- Location in Madagascar
- Coordinates: 18°38′S 47°36′E
- Country: Madagascar
- Region: Analamanga
- District: Ambohidratrimo (district)

Area
  - Total: 130 km^{2} (50 sq mi)

Population (2019)Census
  - Total: 6,523
- Time zone: UTC3 (EAT)
- Postal code: 105

Avaratsena is a rural municipality in Madagascar. It belongs to the district of Ambohidratrimo (district), which is a part of Analamanga Region. The population of the commune was 6,523.

It is situated in a distance of 45 km north from the capital of Antananarivo. 6 villages belong to the territory of the municipality: Avaratsena, Sahalemaka, Antanetimboahangy, Mahavanona, Avaratrimanarina, Ambatomanana, Ankodondona and Malaza.
