= Torch relay =

Torch relay may refer to:

- The carrying of the Olympic Torch
  - Any of the Olympic torch relays
- Pan American Torch, a torch relay associated with the Panamerican Games
- Asian Games Torch, a torch relay associated with the Asian Games
- Chess Olympiad Torch Relay, a torch relay associated with the Chess Olympiad
