= Manjakavaradrano =

- Location in Madagascar
- Coordinates: 18°42′S 47°29′E
- Country: Madagascar
- Region: Analamanga
- District: Ambohidratrimo (district)

Population (2016)
  - Total: 5,750
- Time zone: UTC3 (EAT)

Manjakavaradrano is a town and commune in Madagascar. It belongs to the district of Ambohidratrimo (district), which is a part of Analamanga Region. The population of the commune was estimated to be approximately 5,750 .
