= Hubert Rakotombelontsoa =

Malagasy hurdler

Hubert N. Rakotombelontsoa
Personal information
- Nationality: Malagasy
- Born: 8 December 1968 (age 57) Madagascar
- Height: 183 cm (6 ft 0 in)
- Weight: 72 kg (159 lb)

Sport
- Country: Madagascar
- Sport: Hurdling

Achievements and titles
- Personal best: 49.89

Hubert Rakotombelontsoa is a Malagasy Olympic hurdler. He represented his country in the men's 400 metres hurdles at the 1992 Summer Olympics. His time was a 51.54 in the hurdles.
