= Joseph Rakotoarimanana =

Malagasy middle-distance runner

Joseph Rakotoarimanana (born 6 October 1972) is a retired Malagasy athlete who specialized in the 800 metres.

Competing at the 1996 Summer Olympics, he set his career best time of 1:47.33 minutes in the heats. This is the current Malagasy record. He also competed at the 1997 World Indoor Championships and the 1997 World Championships without progressing from the heats.
