= Jules Randrianarivelo =

Malagasy long-distance runner

Personal information
- National team: Madagascar
- Born: 28 November 1956 (age 69)
- Height: 1.67 m (5 ft 6 in)
- Weight: 56 kg (123 lb)

Sport
- Sport: Long-distance running
- Events: 10,000 metres Marathon

Jules Randrianarivelo also written as Jules Randrianari (born 28 November 1956) is a Malagasy former long-distance runner and rice farmer.

== Biography ==
=== Athletics career ===
Randrianarivelo is since July 1979 the national record holder in the 10,000 metres with a time of 28:42.00 (21 July 1979) and in the marathon with a time of 2:17:14 (29 July 1979); both set in Moscow, Soviet Union.

He competed at the 1980 Summer Olympics in Moscow in the marathon event and in the 10,000 metres. In the marathon event he finished in 25th place, and was for Madagascar the most successful achievement at the Olympics, since its debut at the 1960 Olympics. Four years later he participated at the 1984 Summer Olympics in Los Angeles in the marathon event.

=== Professional career ===
Randrianarivelo is a Malagasy farmer and agricultural leader living in Amparafaravola. He had farmed since childhood, following a family tradition of rice farming, owning three hectares of rice fields producing Dista pink rice. He was President of the Association Koloharena from 1993 and President of the Confédération Nationale Koloharena Sahavanona from 2003. He was awarded the Chevalier de l'Ordre de Mérite Agricole in recognition of his significant contributions and dedicated work in advancing the agricultural sector in Madagascar.
