= Jean-Louis Ravelomanantsoa =

Malagasy sprinter

Personal information
- Born: 30 March 1943 Antananarivo, Madagascar
- Died: 27 September 2016 (aged 73) Lyon, France
Medal record
Men's Athletics
Representing Madagascar
All-Africa Games
Bronze medal – third place	1965 Brazzaville	200 m
Universiade
Bronze medal – third place	1970 Turin	100 m

Jean-Louis Ravelomanantsoa (30 March 1943 – 27 September 2016) was a Malagasy athlete who specialized in the 100 metres.

At the 1964 Summer Olympics he was eliminated in the heats in both 100 and 200 metres.

At the 1968 Summer Olympics he was again eliminated in the heats of the 200 m, but reached the 100 metres final and placed eighth. At these Games he also set his career best time of 10.18 seconds in a tail wind of 2.0 m/s. This is the current Malagasy record.

At the 1972 Summer Olympics he reached the semi-final of the 100 metres and was eliminated in the heats with the Madagascar 4 x 100 metres relay team.

In 1975 he became the first of only two men to date to have won the Stawell Gift, Australia's most prestigious professional foot race, off the scratch mark. The race is run over 120 metres, but entrants are handicapped according to their competitive form, and most start at a mark a few metres ahead of the start line.

Ravelomanantsoa died on 27 September 2016, aged 73, in Lyon.
