= Malagasy Olympic Committee =

National Olympic Committee

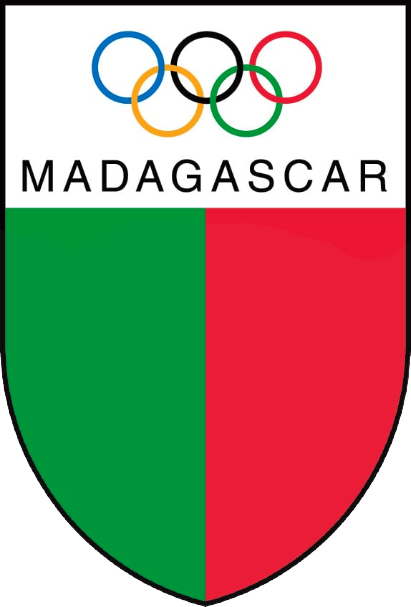
- Country/Region: Madagascar
- Code: MAD
- Recognized: 1964
- Continental Association: ANOCA
- Headquarters: Antananarivo, Madagascar
- President: Siteny Thierry Randrianasoloniaiko
- Secretary General: Jean Alex Harinelina Randriamanarivo

The Malagasy Olympic Committee (French: Comité Olympique Malgache) (IOC code: MAD) is the National Olympic Committee representing Madagascar.

== See also ==
- Madagascar at the Olympics
