= 1987 World Championships in Athletics – Men's 4 × 400 metres relay =

The 4 × 400 metres relay at the 1987 World Championships in Athletics was held at the Stadio Olimpico on September 5 and September 6.

== Medals ==
Gold:	Silver:	Bronze:
United States; Danny Everett; Roddie Haley; Antonio McKay; Harry Reynolds; Michael Franks*; Raymond Pierre*	Great Britain; Derek Redmond; Kriss Akabusi; Roger Black; Philip Brown; Todd Bennett*; Mark Thomas*	Cuba; Leandro Peñalver; Agustin Pavó; Lázaro Martínez; Roberto Hernández

Note: * Indicates athletes who ran in preliminary rounds.

== Records ==
Existing records at the start of the event.

World Record	United States (USA)	2:56.16	Mexico City, Mexico	October 20, 1968
Championship Record	Soviet Union (URS)	3:00.79	Helsinki, Finland	August 14, 1983

== Results ==
All times shown are in seconds.

AR area record | CR championship record | GR games record | NR national record | OR Olympic record | PB personal best | SB season best | WL world leading (in a given season)
DNS = did not start | DQ = disqualification | NM = no mark (i.e. no valid result) | Q = qualification by place in heat | q = qualification by overall place

=== Final ===
Rank	Team	Name	Result	Notes
Gold medal	United States	Danny Everett, Roddie Haley, Antonio McKay, Butch Reynolds	2:57.29	CR
Silver medal	Great Britain	Derek Redmond, Kriss Akabusi, Roger Black, Philip Brown)	2:58.86	AR
Bronze medal	Cuba	Leandro Peñalver, Agustin Pavó, Lázaro Martínez, Roberto Hernández	2:59.16	NR
4	West Germany	Norbert Dobeleit, Mark Henrich, Edgar Itt, Harald Schmid	2:59.96	NR
5	Kenya	Joseph Sainah, John Anzrah, Elijah Bitok, David Kitur	3:01.67	
6	Jamaica	Mark Senior, Devon Morris, Winthrop Graham, Bert Cameron	3:04.53	
**	Soviet Union	Yevgeniy Lomtyev, Vladimir Prosin, Aleksandr Kurochkin, Vladimir Krylov	DNF	
**	Nigeria	Moses Ugbisie, Joseph Falaye, Henry Amike, Innocent Egbunike	DNS	

=== Semi-finals ===
==== Heat 1 ====
Rank	Team	Name	Result	Notes
1	Cuba	Leandro Peñalver, Agustin Pavó, Lázaro Martínez, Roberto Hernández	3:00.99	Q
2	Great Britain	Mark Thomas, Kriss Akabusi, Todd Bennett, Philip Brown	3:01.47	Q
3	Soviet Union	Arkadiy Kornilov, Yevgeniy Lomtyev, Vladimir Prosin, Aleksandr Kurochkin	3:01.61	Q
4	Nigeria	Moses Ugbisie, Joseph Falaye, Henry Amike, Innocent Egbunike	3:01.92	Q
5	Canada	Andre Smith, Courtney Brown, John Graham, Anton Skerritt	3:02.90	
6	France	Aldo Canti, Jean-Jacques Boussemart, Patrick Barré, Yann Quentrec	3:03.41	
7	Japan	Koichi Konakatomi, Kenji Yamauchi, Hiromi Kawasumi, Susumu Takano	3:04.86	
8	Spain	Cayetano Cornet, Antonio Sánchez, José Alonso, Angel Heras	3:06.41	

==== Heat 2 ====
Rank	Team	Name	Result	Notes
1	United States	Danny Everett, Michael Franks, Raymond Pierre, Antonio McKay	2:59.06	CR Q
2	Kenya	Joseph Sainah, Elijah Bitok, David Kitur, John Anzrah	3:00.73	Q
3	Jamaica	Mark Senior, Devon Morris, Winthrop Graham, Bert Cameron	3:01.08	NR Q
4	West Germany	Peter Schwelm, Edgar Itt, Klaus Just, Mark Henrich	3:01.18	Q
5	Yugoslavia	Branislav Karaulić, Slobodan Popović, Slobodan Branković, Ismail Mačev	3:03.30	NR
6	Italy	Marcello Pantone, Vito Petrella, Tiziano Gemelli, Roberto Ribaud	3:03.91	
7	Australia	Robert Stone, Gary Minihan, Peter Stubbs, Darren Clark	3:04.59	
**	East Germany	Jens Carlowitz, Frank Möller, Mathias Schersing, Thomas Schönlebe	DNF	

=== Heats ===
==== Heat 1 ====
Rank	Team	Name	Result	Notes
1	United States	Danny Everett, Michael Franks, Raymond Pierre, Antonio McKay	3:03.00	Q
2	East Germany	Mathias Schersing, Michael Schimmer, Jens Carlowitz, Thomas Schönlebe	3:03.57	Q
3	Yugoslavia	Branislav Karaulić, Slobodan Popović, Slobodan Branković, Ismail Mačev	3:03.89	Q
4	Nigeria	Moses Ugbisie, Joseph Falaye, Henry Amike, Innocent Egbunike	3:03.90	Q
5	Canada	Andre Smith, Courtney Brown, John Graham, Anton Skerritt	3:04.08	q
6	Spain	Cayetano Cornet, Antonio Sánchez, José Alonso, Angel Heras	3:05.02	q
7	Ivory Coast	Akissi Kpidi, Zongo Kuyo, Djedjemel Anatole, René Mélédjé	3:05.34	
8	Ireland	Kieran Finn, Gerry Delaney, John Barry, Peter Sinclair	3:07.18	

==== Heat 2 ====
Rank	Team	Name	Result	Notes
1	Kenya	Joseph Sainah, Elijah Bitok, Tito Sawe, John Anzrah	3:02.32	Q
2	Cuba	Leandro Peñalver, Agustin Pavó, Lázaro Martínez, Roberto Hernández	3:02.62	Q
3	Soviet Union	Arkadiy Kornilov, Yevgeniy Lomtyev, Vladimir Prosin, Aleksandr Kurochkin	3:02.79	Q
4	Jamaica	Mark Senior, Devon Morris, Winthrop Graham, Bert Cameron	3:05.11	Q
5	Czechoslovakia	Jindrich Roun, Stanislav Navesnak, Jozef Kucej, Lubos Balosak	3:05.44	
6	Brazil	Washington Rodrigues, Sérgio Menezes, Gerson A. Souza, José Luíz Barbosa	3:05.64	
7	Argentina	Fabián Garbolino, Dardo Angerami, Luis Migueles, José María Beduino	3:12.96	

==== Heat 3 ====
Rank	Team	Name	Result	Notes
1	Great Britain	Mark Thomas, Kriss Akabusi, Todd Bennett, Philip Brown	3:03.75	Q
2	Japan	Koichi Konakatomi, Kenji Yamauchi, Hiromi Kawasumi, Susumu Takano	3:03.86	Q
3	West Germany	Peter Schwelm, Mark Henrich, Klaus Just, Edgar Itt	3:03.87	Q
4	Australia	Robert Stone, Gary Minihan, Peter Stubbs, Darren Clark	3:04.22	Q
5	Italy	Marcello Pantone, Vito Petrella, Andrea Montanari, Roberto Ribaud	3:04.64	q
6	France	Aldo Canti, Jean-Jacques Boussemart, Patrick Barré, Yann Quentrec	3:04.64	q
7	Chinese Taipei	Lin Kuang-liang, Hsu Ruo-ta, Lee Shiun-long, Lin Tsai-tien	3:11.45	
