= 1986 European Athletics Championships – Men's 4 × 400 metres relay =

Men's 4 × 400 metres relay at the European Athletics Championships

The men's 4 × 400 metres relay event at the 1986 European Athletics Championships was held in Stuttgart, then West Germany, at Neckarstadion on 30 and 31 August 1986.

== Medalists ==
Gold	Derek Redmond; Kriss Akabusi; Brian Whittle; Roger Black; United Kingdom
Silver	Klaus Just; Edgar Itt; Harald Schmid; Ralf Lübke; West Germany
Bronze	Vladimir Prosin; Vladimir Krylov; Arkadiy Kornilov; Aleksandr Kurochkin; Soviet Union

== Results ==
=== Final ===
31 August

Rank	Nation	Competitors	Time	Notes
1st place, gold medalist(s)	United Kingdom	Derek Redmond; Kriss Akabusi; Brian Whittle; Roger Black	2:59.84	CR
2nd place, silver medalist(s)	West Germany	Klaus Just; Edgar Itt; Harald Schmid; Ralf Lübke	3:00.17	NR
3rd place, bronze medalist(s)	Soviet Union	Vladimir Prosin; Vladimir Krylov; Arkadiy Kornilov; Aleksandr Kurochkin	3:00.47	
4	Italy	Giovanni Bongiorni; Mauro Zuliani; Vito Petrella; Roberto Ribaud	3:01.37	NR
5	Spain	Juan José Prado; Antonio Sánchez; José Alonso; Ángel Heras	3:04.12	
6	East Germany	Frank Möller; Carlo Niestadt; Thomas Schönlebe; Mathias Schersing	3:04.87	
7	Yugoslavia	Slobodan Branković; Slobodan Popović; Predrag Melnjak; Željko Knapić	3:05.27	
8	France	Yann Quentrec; Philippe Gonigam; Jean-Jacques Boussemart; Aldo Canti	3:10.17	

=== Heats ===
30 August

==== Heat 1 ====
Rank	Nation	Competitors	Time	Notes
1	West Germany	Klaus Just; Edgar Itt; Jörg Vaihinger; Harald Schmid	3:03.79	Q
2	Italy	Giovanni Bongiorni; Mauro Zuliani; Vito Petrella; Roberto Ribaud	3:03.96	Q
3	United Kingdom	Kriss Akabusi; Brian Whittle; Phil Brown; Roger Black	3:04.17	Q
4	Spain	Juan José Prado; Antonio Sánchez; José Alonso; Ángel Heras	3:04.44	q
5	Hungary	Gusztáv Menczer; László Kiss; István Takács; István Szabó	3:09.50	

==== Heat 2 ====
Rank	Nation	Competitors	Time	Notes
1	Soviet Union	Vladimir Volodko; Vladimir Prosin; Arkadiy Kornilov; Aleksandr Kurochkin	3:04.60	Q
2	East Germany	Frank Möller; Carlo Niestadt; Thomas Schönlebe; Mathias Schersing	3:05.53	Q
3	Yugoslavia	Slobodan Branković; Slobodan Popović; Predrag Melnjak; Željko Knapić	3:05.92	Q
4	France	Yann Quentrec; Pascal Barré; Jean-Jacques Boussemart; Aldo Canti	3:06.40	q

== Participation ==
According to an unofficial count, 40 athletes from 9 countries participated in the event.

- East Germany (4)
- France (5)
- Hungary (4)
- Italy (4)
- Soviet Union (5)
- Spain (4)
- United Kingdom (5)
- West Germany (5)
- Yugoslavia (4)
