= 1987 World Championships in Athletics – Men's 400 metres =

Men's 400 metres at the 1987 World Championships
- Venue: Stadio Olimpico
- Dates: 30 August (heats); 31 August (quarter-finals); 1 September (semi-finals); 3 September (final)
- Competitors: 48
- Winning time: 44.33

Medalists
gold medal	Thomas Schönlebe	East Germany
silver medal	Innocent Egbunike	Nigeria
bronze medal	Butch Reynolds	United States

These are the official results of the Men's 400 metres event at the 1987 IAAF World Championships in Rome, Italy. There were a total number of 48 participating athletes, with six qualifying heats and the final held on Thursday 3rd September 1987. The winning margin was 0.23 seconds.

== Medalists ==
Gold	Thomas Schönlebe; East Germany (GDR)
Silver	Innocent Egbunike; Nigeria (NGA)
Bronze	Harry Reynolds; United States (USA)

== Records ==
Existing records at the start of the event.

World Record	Lee Evans (USA)	43.86	Mexico City, Mexico	October 18, 1968
Championship Record	Bert Cameron (JAM)	45.05	Helsinki, Finland	August 10, 1983

== Final ==
RANK	FINAL	TIME
	Thomas Schönlebe (GDR)	44.33 AR
	Innocent Egbunike (NGR)	44.56
	Butch Reynolds (USA)	44.80
4.	Roberto Hernández (CUB)	44.99
5.	Derek Redmond (GBR)	45.06
6.	David Kitur (KEN)	45.34
7.	Gabriel Tiacoh (CIV)	46.27
8.	Roddie Haley (USA)	46.77

== Semifinals ==
- Held on Sunday 1987-09-01

RANK	HEAT 1	TIME
1.	Innocent Egbunike (NGR)	44.26
2.	Thomas Schönlebe (GDR)	44.56
3.	Roberto Hernández (CUB)	44.83
4.	Roddie Haley (USA)	45.21
5.	Marcel Arnold (SUI)	45.26
6.	Anton Skerritt (CAN)	45.62
7.	Mathias Schersing (GDR)	45.67
8.	Aleksandr Kurochkin (URS)	45.73
9.	Devon Morris (JAM)	45.76

RANK	HEAT 2	TIME
1.	Derek Redmond (GBR)	44.50
2.	Gabriel Tiacoh (CIV)	44.69
3.	David Kitur (KEN)	44.73
4.	Harry Reynolds (USA)	44.94
5.	Jens Carlowitz (GDR)	44.97
6.	Bert Cameron (JAM)	45.19
7.	Moses Ugbisie (NGR)	45.72
8.	Darren Clark (AUS)	45.93

== Quarterfinals ==
- Held on Saturday 1987-08-31

RANK	HEAT 1	TIME
1.	Derek Redmond (GBR)	45.03
2.	Roberto Hernández (CUB)	45.33
3.	Mathias Schersing (GDR)	45.50
4.	Darren Clark (AUS)	45.58
5.	Hector Daley (PAN)	46.05
6.	Antonio Sánchez (ESP)	46.19
7.	John Anzrah (KEN)	46.45
	Alemayehu Gudeta (ETH)	DNS

RANK	HEAT 2	TIME
1.	Thomas Schönlebe (GDR)	44.81
2.	David Kitur (KEN)	44.94
3.	Roddie Haley (USA)	45.14
4.	Bert Cameron (JAM)	45.14
5.	Susumu Takano (JPN)	45.81
6.	Mohamed Amer Al-Malky (OMA)	45.94
7.	Vladimir Prosin (URS)	45.94
8.	Luboš Balošák (TCH)	46.76

RANK	HEAT 3	TIME
1.	Innocent Egbunike (NGR)	45.46
2.	Devon Morris (JAM)	45.49
3.	Butch Reynolds (USA)	45.49
4.	Anton Skerritt (CAN)	45.65
5.	Aleksandr Kurochkin (URS)	45.76
6.	Tito Sawe (KEN)	45.93
7.	Gérson de Souza (BRA)	46.46
8.	Ismail Mačev (YUG)	46.54

RANK	HEAT 4	TIME
1.	Jens Carlowitz (GDR)	45.27
2.	Moses Ugbisie (NGR)	45.30
3.	Gabriel Tiacoh (CIV)	45.33
4.	Marcel Arnold (SUI)	45.76
5.	Antonio McKay (USA)	45.85
6.	Elvis Forde (BAR)	45.92
7.	Philip Brown (GBR)	46.49
8.	Roberto Ribaud (ITA)	46.68

== Qualifying heats ==
- Held on Saturday 1987-08-30

RANK	HEAT 1	TIME
1.	Butch Reynolds (USA)	45.51
2.	Susumu Takano (JPN)	45.68
3.	Mathias Schersing (GDR)	45.86
4.	Anton Skerritt (CAN)	46.15
5.	Mohamed Amer Al-Malky (OMN)	46.23
6.	Bruce Phillip (DMA)	46.56
7.	Félix Stevens (CUB)	46.89
	Mohamed Hossain Milzer (BAN)	DNS

RANK	HEAT 2	TIME
1.	David Kitur (KEN)	45.39
2.	Innocent Egbunike (NGR)	45.84
3.	Elvis Forde (BAR)	45.99
4.	Hector Daley (PAN)	46.26
5.	Todd Bennett (GBR)	46.58
6.	Lyndon George (LCA)	47.25
7.	Ian Morris (TRI)	48.06
8.	Bienvenu Yagbongo (CAF)	50.14

RANK	HEAT 3	TIME
1.	Gabriel Tiacoh (CIV)	45.65
2.	Darren Clark (AUS)	45.70
3.	Aleksandr Kurochkin (URS)	45.74
4.	Marcel Arnold (SUI)	45.76
5.	Devon Morris (JAM)	45.83
6.	Ismail Mačev (YUG)	46.30
7.	Gérson de Souza (BRA)	46.39
	Yaya Seyba (MLI)	DNS

RANK	HEAT 4	TIME
1.	Moses Ugbisie (NGR)	45.55
2.	Thomas Schönlebe (GDR)	45.85
3.	Antonio McKay (USA)	46.30
4.	Roberto Ribaud (ITA)	46.37
5.	Yann Quentrec (FRA)	46.78
6.	Mark Senior (JAM)	47.30
7.	Adram M'Kumi (TAN)	47.39
8.	Dawda Jallow (GAM)	48.40

RANK	HEAT 5	TIME
1.	Derek Redmond (GBR)	45.33
2.	Jens Carlowitz (GDR)	45.52
3.	Roddie Haley (USA)	45.73
4.	Tito Sawe (KEN)	45.93
5.	Luboš Balošák (TCH)	46.49
6.	Antonio Sánchez (ESP)	46.54
7.	Tamás Molnár (HUN)	46.80
8.	Elieser Wattebosi (INA)	47.32

RANK	HEAT 6	TIME
1.	Roberto Hernández (CUB)	45.68
2.	John Anzrah (KEN)	45.91
3.	Bert Cameron (JAM)	45.94
4.	Philip Brown (GBR)	46.08
5.	Alemayehu Gudeta (ETH)	46.25
6.	Vladimir Prosin (URS)	46.26
7.	Jesús Malavé (VEN)	47.10
8.	Lenford O'Garro (VIN)	49.19
