= 1987 European Athletics Indoor Championships – Men's 400 metres =

The men's 400 metres event at the 1987 European Athletics Indoor Championships was held on 21 and 22 February.

== Medalists ==
Gold	Silver	Bronze
Todd Bennett; Great Britain	Momchil Kharizanov; Bulgaria	Paul Harmsworth; Great Britain

== Results ==
=== Heats ===
Rank	Heat	Name	Nationality	Time	Notes
1	1	Mark Henrich	West Germany	47.01	
2	1	Paul Harmsworth	Great Britain	47.23	
3	1	Mauro Zuliani	Italy	47.39	
4	1	Momchil Kharizanov	Bulgaria	47.64	
5	1	Cayetano Cornet	Spain	47.75	
1	2	Arjen Visserman	Netherlands	47.04	
2	2	Roberto Ribaud	Italy	47.16	
3	2	Todd Bennett	Great Britain	47.36	
4	2	Ismail Mačev	Yugoslavia	47.68	
	2	Ángel Heras	Spain	DNF	
1	3	Aldo Canti	France	47.84	
2	3	Vito Petrella	Italy	47.86	
3	3	José Alonso	Spain	47.87	
4	3	Steve Heard	Great Britain	48.04	
5	3	Željko Knapić	Yugoslavia	48.54	
1	4	Vito Petrella	Italy	47.28	
2	4	Antonio Sánchez	Spain	47.32	
3	4	Klaus Ehrle	Austria	47.39	
4	4	Mark Thomas	Great Britain	47.83	
5	4	Manlio Molinari	San Marino	49.14	NR

=== Semifinals ===
First 3 from each semifinal qualified directly (Q) for the final.

Rank	Heat	Name	Nationality	Time	Notes
1	2	Arjen Visserman	Netherlands	46.80	Q
2	2	Momchil Kharizanov	Bulgaria	46.87	Q
3	2	Mauro Zuliani	Italy	47.03	Q
4	1	Todd Bennett	Great Britain	47.09	Q
5	2	Aldo Canti	France	47.13	
6	1	Mark Henrich	West Germany	47.52	Q
7	1	Paul Harmsworth	Great Britain	47.56	Q
8	2	Roberto Ribaud	Italy	47.63	
8	1	Vito Petrella	Italy	47.65	
10	2	José Alonso	Spain	47.79	
11	1	Cayetano Cornet	Spain	48.09	
12	1	Ismail Mačev	Yugoslavia	48.15	

=== Final ===
Rank	Name	Nationality	Time	Notes
1st place, gold medalist(s)	Todd Bennett	Great Britain	46.81	
2nd place, silver medalist(s)	Momchil Kharizanov	Bulgaria	46.89	
3rd place, bronze medalist(s)	Paul Harmsworth	Great Britain	46.92	
4	Arjen Visserman	Netherlands	46.96	
5	Mark Henrich	West Germany	47.42	
6	Mauro Zuliani	Italy	47.50	
