= 1989 IAAF World Indoor Championships – Men's 400 metres =

The men's 400 metres event at the 1989 IAAF World Indoor Championships was held at the Budapest Sportcsarnok in Budapest on 4 and 5 March 1989.

The winning margin was 0.50 seconds which as of July 2024 remains the greatest winning margin in the men's 400 metres at these championships.

== Medalists ==
Gold	Silver	Bronze
Antonio McKay; United States	Ian Morris; Trinidad and Tobago	Cayetano Cornet; Spain

== Results ==
=== Heats ===
The first 2 of each heat (Q) and next 2 fastest (q) qualified for the semifinals.

Rank	Heat	Name	Nationality	Time	Notes
1	3	Cayetano Cornet	Spain	46.64	Q
2	5	Brian Whittle	Great Britain	46.69	Q
3	5	Slobodan Branković	Yugoslavia	46.69	Q
4	1	Antonio McKay	United States	46.86	Q
5	2	Howard Burnett	Jamaica	46.91	Q
6	5	Bert Cameron	Jamaica	46.93	q
7	2	Jörg Vaihinger	West Germany	47.00	Q
7	4	Gabriel Tiacoh	Ivory Coast	47.00	Q
9	1	Ian Morris	Trinidad and Tobago	47.09	Q
10	1	Arjen Visserman	Netherlands	47.11	q
11	3	Alemayehu Gudeta	Ethiopia	47.14	Q, NR
12	4	Clarence Daniel	United States	47.20	Q
13	5	Ervin Katona	Hungary	47.33	
14	3	Todd Bennett	Great Britain	47.35	
15	3	Tomasz Jędrusik	Poland	47.36	
16	2	Gusztáv Menczer	Hungary	47.43	
17	1	Antonio Sánchez	Spain	47.60	
18	2	Romeo Gido	Philippines	47.63	NR
19	3	Klaus Just	West Germany	47.67	
20	5	Anton Skerritt	Canada	47.69	
21	2	Patrick Delice	Trinidad and Tobago	47.86	
22	4	Takahiro Watanabe	Japan	47.97	
23	4	Troy Douglas	Bermuda	48.46	NR
24	2	Ahmed Abdelhalim Ghanem	Egypt	48.63	
25	1	Luis Karim Toledo	Mexico	48.65	NR
26	4	Gerson Souza	Brazil	49.04	

=== Semifinals ===
First 3 of each semifinal (Q) qualified directly for the final.

Rank	Heat	Name	Nationality	Time	Notes
1	1	Antonio McKay	United States	46.06	Q
2	1	Cayetano Cornet	Spain	46.30	Q
3	2	Slobodan Branković	Yugoslavia	46.49	Q
4	1	Ian Morris	Trinidad and Tobago	46.52	Q, NR
5	2	Gabriel Tiacoh	Ivory Coast	46.69	Q, NR
6	2	Brian Whittle	Great Britain	46.71	Q
7	2	Arjen Visserman	Netherlands	46.94	
8	1	Alemayehu Gudeta	Ethiopia	46.96	NR
9	1	Jörg Vaihinger	West Germany	47.01	
10	2	Clarence Daniel	United States	47.03	
11	1	Howard Burnett	Jamaica	47.18	
12	2	Bert Cameron	Jamaica	47.78	

=== Final ===
Rank	Lane	Name	Nationality	Time	Notes
1st place, gold medalist(s)	5	Antonio McKay	United States	45.59	CR
2nd place, silver medalist(s)	2	Ian Morris	Trinidad and Tobago	46.09	NR
3rd place, bronze medalist(s)	4	Cayetano Cornet	Spain	46.40	
4	6	Slobodan Branković	Yugoslavia	46.48	
5	3	Brian Whittle	Great Britain	46.78	
6	1	Gabriel Tiacoh	Ivory Coast	47.35	
