= 1987 European Cup (athletics) =

- Dates: 27–28 June
- Host city: Prague, Czechoslovakia
- Level: Senior
- Type: Outdoor
- Events: 36

The 1987 European Cup was the 11th edition of the European Cup of athletics.

The "A" Finals were held in Prague, Czechoslovakia.

== "A" Final ==
Held on 27 and 28 June in Prague, Czechoslovakia

=== Team standings ===
Men
| Pos. | Nation | Points |
|---|---|---|
| 1 | Soviet Union | 117 |
| 2 | East Germany | 114.5 |
| 3 | Great Britain | 99 |
| 4 | West Germany | 88 |
| 5 | Italy | 87 |
| 6 | Czechoslovakia | 73 |
| 7 | Spain | 72 |
| 8 | Poland | 58.5 |

Women
| Pos. | Nation | Points |
|---|---|---|
| 1 | East Germany | 119 |
| 2 | Soviet Union | 92 |
| 3 | Bulgaria | 86 |
| 4 | West Germany | 77 |
| 5 | Great Britain | 59.5 |
| 6 | Czechoslovakia | 51.5 |
| 7 | Poland | 45 |
| 8 | France | 45 |

=== Results summary ===
==== Men's events ====
| Event | Gold | | Silver | | Bronze | |
|---|---|---|---|---|---|---|
| 100 m (Wind: -1.0 m/s) | Linford Christie; Great Britain | 10.23 | Steffen Bringmann; East Germany | 10.36 | Pierfrancesco Pavoni; Italy | 10.38 |
| 200 m (Wind: +1.5 m/s) | Linford Christie; Great Britain | 20.63 | Steffen Bringmann; East Germany | 20.85 | Andrey Fedoriv; Soviet Union | 20.87 |
| 400 m | Thomas Schönlebe; East Germany | 44.96 =CR | Roger Black; Great Britain | 44.99 | Edgar Itt; West Germany | 45.54 |
| 800 m | Tom McKean; Great Britain | 1:45.96 | Donato Sabia; Italy | 1:46.38 | Peter Braun; West Germany | 1:46.86 |
| 1500 m | José Luis González; Spain | 3:45.49 | Steve Cram; Great Britain | 3:45.54 | Jens-Peter Herold; East Germany | 3:46.19 |
| 5000 m | José Manuel Abascal; Spain | 13:32.87; CR | Tim Hutchings; Great Britain | 13:34.83 | Salvatore Antibo; Italy | 13:35.92 |
| 10,000 m | Abel Antón; Spain | 28:46.65 | Salvatore Antibo; Italy | 28:46.69 | Axel Krippschock; East Germany | 28:51.32 |
| 3000 m steeplechase | Francesco Panetta; Italy | 8:13.47 | Roger Hackney; Great Britain | 8:20.68 | Hagen Melzer; East Germany | 8:21.23 |
| 110 m hurdles (Wind: +0.7 m/s) | Igors Kazanovs; Soviet Union | 13.48 | Colin Jackson; Great Britain | 13.53 | Aleš Höffer; Czechoslovakia | 13.62 |
| 400 m hurdles | Harald Schmid; West Germany | 48.67 | Max Robertson; Great Britain | 49.92 | José Alonso; Spain | 50.15 |
| 4 × 100 m | Soviet Union; Aleksandr Yevgenyev; Viktor Bryzgin; Vladimir Muravyov; Vladimir Krylov | 38.42 | East Germany; Heiko Truppel; Steffen Bringmann; Steffen Schwab; Frank Emmelmann | 39.03 | Italy; Ezio Madonia; Giovanni Bongiorni; Paolo Catalano; Pier Francesco Pavoni | 39.55 |
| 4 × 400 m | East Germany; Jens Carlowitz; Carlo Niestadt; Mathias Schersing; Thomas Schönlebe | 3:00.80 | Great Britain; Paul Harmsworth; Brian Whittle; Todd Bennett; Roger Black | 3:01.12 | West Germany; Norbert Dobeleit; Edgar Itt; Jörg Vaihinger; Harald Schmid | 3:01.32 |
| High jump | Igor Paklin; Soviet Union | 2.32 | Ján Zvara; Czechoslovakia | 2.29 | Krzysztof Krawczyk; Poland; Gerd Wessig; East Germany | 2.26 |
| Pole vault | Grigoriy Yegorov; Soviet Union | 5.70 | Zdenek Lubenský; Czechoslovakia | 5.60 | Bernhard Zintl; West Germany | 5.35 |
| Long jump | Robert Emmiyan; Soviet Union | 8.38; CR | Marco Delonge; East Germany | 8.04 | Ivo Krsek; Czechoslovakia | 7.98 |
| Triple jump | Oleg Protsenko; Soviet Union | 17.61 | Zdzisław Hoffmann; Poland | 17.06 | Peter Bouschen; West Germany | 16.98 |
| Shot put | Ulf Timmermann; East Germany | 22.01 | Alessandro Andrei; Italy | 21.46 | Remigius Machura; Czechoslovakia | 21.40 |
| Discus throw | Vaclovas Kidykas; Soviet Union | 66.80 | Jürgen Schult; East Germany | 66.54 | Rolf Danneberg; West Germany | 66.18 |
| Hammer throw | Sergey Litvinov; Soviet Union | 82.28 | Ralf Haber; East Germany | 79.76 | Christoph Sahner; West Germany | 75.28 |
| Javelin throw | Viktor Yevsyukov; Soviet Union | 84.86 | Klaus Tafelmeier; West Germany | 83.30 | Jan Železný; Czechoslovakia | 81.18 |
WR world record | AR area record | CR championship record | GR games record | NR national record | OR Olympic record | PB personal best | SB season best | WL world leading (in a given season)

==== Women's events ====
| Event | Gold | | Silver | | Bronze | |
|---|---|---|---|---|---|---|
| 100 m (Wind: -0.4 m/s) | Marlies Göhr; East Germany | 10.95 | Anelia Nuneva; Bulgaria | 11.08 | Ulrike Sarvari; West Germany | 11.30 |
| 200 m (Wind: +1.3 m/s) | Silke Gladisch; East Germany | 21.99; CR | Nadezhda Georgieva; Bulgaria | 22.50 | Ewa Kasprzyk; Poland | 22.63 |
| 400 m | Petra Müller; East Germany | 49.91 | Mariya Pinigina; Soviet Union | 50.46 | Rositsa Stamenova; Bulgaria | 51.23 |
| 800 m | Tatyana Samolenko; Soviet Union | 1:59.26 | Jarmila Kratochvílová; Czechoslovakia | 1:59.26 | Christine Wachtel; East Germany | 1:59.54 |
| 1500 m | Kirsty Wade; Great Britain | 4:09.03 | Tatyana Samolenko; Soviet Union | 4:09.60 | Andrea Lange; East Germany | 4:09.82 |
| 3000 m | Ulrike Bruns; East Germany | 8:44.48 | Yvonne Murray; Great Britain | 8:48.15 | Olga Bondarenko; Soviet Union | 8:48.54 |
| 10,000 m | Kathrin Ullrich; East Germany | 32:42.05 | Angela Tooby; Great Britain | 32:46.78 | Natalya Sorokivskaya; Soviet Union | 33:10.18 |
| 100 m hurdles (Wind: -0.9 m/s) | Cornelia Oschkenat; East Germany | 12.47; CR | Yordanka Donkova; Bulgaria | 12.53 | Claudia Zaczkiewicz; West Germany | 12.97 |
| 400 m hurdles | Sabine Busch; East Germany | 54.23 | Genowefa Błaszak; Poland | 55.44 | Yelena Goncharova; Soviet Union | 55.70 |
| 4 × 100 m | East Germany; Silke Gladisch; Heike Drechsler; Ingrid Auerswald; Marlies Göhr | 41.94 | Bulgaria; Ginka Zagorcheva; Anelia Nuneva; Nadezhda Georgieva; Yordanka Donkova | 42.31 | West Germany; Silke Knoll; Ulrike Sarvari; Andrea Thomas; Ute Thimm | 43.23 |
| 4 × 400 m | Soviet Union; Vineta Ikauniece; Maria Pinigina; Lyudmila Dzhigalova; Olga Nazarova | 3:20.41 | East Germany; Kirsten Emmelmann; Sabine Busch; Heike Drechsler; Petra Müller | 3:20.60 | West Germany; Ute Thimm; Karin Lix; Helga Arendt; Gisela Kinzel | 3:25.29 |
| High jump | Stefka Kostadinova; Bulgaria | 2.00 | Tamara Bykova; Soviet Union | 1.96 | Heike Redetzky; West Germany | 1.96 |
| Long jump | Heike Drechsler; East Germany | 7.26 | Galina Chistyakova; Soviet Union | 7.15 | Sofia Bozhanova; Bulgaria | 6.75w |
| Shot put | Natalya Lisovskaya; Soviet Union | 21.56; CR | Ines Müller; East Germany | 20.82 | Helena Fibingerová; Czechoslovakia | 20.28 |
| Discus throw | Diana Gansky; East Germany | 73.90; CR | Tsvetanka Khristova; Bulgaria | 68.26 | Zdenka Šilhavá; Czechoslovakia | 65.04 |
| Javelin throw | Petra Felke; East Germany | 71.26 | Natalya Yermolovich; Soviet Union | 64.42 | Beate Peters; West Germany | 64.38 |
WR world record | AR area record | CR championship record | GR games record | NR national record | OR Olympic record | PB personal best | SB season best | WL world leading (in a given season)

== "B" Final ==
Both "B" finals held on 27 and 28 June in Gothenburg, Sweden

Men
| Pos. | Nation | Points |
|---|---|---|
| 1 | France | 117 |
| 2 | Bulgaria | 102 |
| 3 | Sweden | 97 |
| 4 | Hungary | 87 |
| 5 | Austria | 82 |
| 6 | Switzerland | 82 |
| 7 | Finland | 76.5 |
| 8 | Yugoslavia | 73.5 |

Women
| Pos. | Nation | Points |
|---|---|---|
| 1 | Romania | 106 |
| 2 | Hungary | 83 |
| 3 | Italy | 80.5 |
| 4 | Switzerland | 69.5 |
| 5 | Finland | 62.5 |
| 6 | Sweden | 62.5 |
| 7 | Norway | 56 |
| 8 | Netherlands | 50 |

== "C" Finals ==
All "C" finals held on 27 and 28 August

=== Men ===
"C1" Final
Held in Athens, Greece

| Pos. | Nation | Points |
|---|---|---|
| 1 | Greece | 83 |
| 2 | Netherlands | 72 |
| 3 | Denmark | 60.5 |
| 4 | Cyprus | 46.5 |
| 5 | Turkey | 37 |

"C2" Final
Held in Maia, Portugal

| Pos. | Nation | Points |
|---|---|---|
| 1 | Belgium | 72 |
| 2 | Portugal | 66 |
| 3 | Ireland | 62 |
| 4 | Norway | 60 |
| 5 | Iceland | 39 |

=== Women ===
"C1" Final
Held in Athens, Greece

| Pos. | Nation | Points |
|---|---|---|
| 1 | Yugoslavia | 83 |
| 2 | Austria | 71 |
| 3 | Greece | 66 |
| 4 | Denmark | 52 |
| 5 | Cyprus | 31 |
| 5 | Turkey | 31 |

"C2" Final
Held in Maia, Portugal

| Pos. | Nation | Points |
|---|---|---|
| 1 | Spain | 70 |
| 2 | Belgium | 59 |
| 3 | Portugal | 41 |
| 4 | Ireland | 35 |
| 5 | Iceland | 32 |
