= 1986 European Athletics Championships – Men's 400 metres =

Men's 400 metres at the European Athletics Championships

The men's 400 metres event at the 1986 European Athletics Championships was held in Stuttgart, then West Germany, at Neckarstadion on 27, 28, and 29 August 1986.

== Medalists ==
Gold	Roger Black; United Kingdom
Silver	Thomas Schönlebe; East Germany
Bronze	Mathias Schersing; East Germany

== Results ==
=== Final ===
29 August

Rank	Name	Nationality	Time	Notes
1st place, gold medalist(s)	Roger Black	United Kingdom	44.59	CR NR
2nd place, silver medalist(s)	Thomas Schönlebe	East Germany	44.63	
3rd place, bronze medalist(s)	Mathias Schersing	East Germany	44.85	
4	Derek Redmond	United Kingdom	45.25	
5	Ralf Lübke	West Germany	45.35	
6	António Sánchez	Spain	45.41	NR
7	Aldo Canti	France	45.93	
8	Erwin Skamrahl	West Germany	46.38	

=== Semi-finals ===
28 August

==== Semi-final 1 ====
Rank	Name	Nationality	Time	Notes
1	Roger Black	United Kingdom	45.33	Q
2	Mathias Schersing	East Germany	45.38	Q
3	Aldo Canti	France	45.62	Q
4	Erwin Skamrahl	West Germany	45.81	Q
5	Yann Quentrec	France	45.89	
6	Aleksandr Kurochkin	Soviet Union	46.01	
7	Roberto Ribaud	Italy	46.22	
8	Phil Brown	United Kingdom	46.61	

==== Semi-final 2 ====
Rank	Name	Nationality	Time	Notes
1	Derek Redmond	United Kingdom	45.35	Q
2	Thomas Schönlebe	East Germany	45.42	Q
3	António Sánchez	Spain	45.71	Q
4	Ralf Lübke	West Germany	45.72	Q
5	Derek O'Connor	Ireland	45.94	
6	Jörg Vaihinger	West Germany	46.36	
7	Arkadiy Kornilov	Soviet Union	46.46	
8	Arjen Visserman	Netherlands	46.66	

=== Heats ===
27 August

==== Heat 1 ====
Rank	Name	Nationality	Time	Notes
1	Roger Black	United Kingdom	45.40	Q
2	António Sánchez	Spain	45.78	Q
3	Erwin Skamrahl	West Germany	46.11	Q
4	Arjen Visserman	Netherlands	46.12	q
5	Mauro Zuliani	Italy	46.53	
6	Ismail Mačev	Yugoslavia	47.52	
7	Fikret Tulumtaş	Turkey	48.97	

==== Heat 2 ====
Rank	Name	Nationality	Time	Notes
1	Phil Brown	United Kingdom	46.00	Q
2	Mathias Schersing	East Germany	46.04	Q
3	Derek O'Connor	Ireland	46.09	Q
4	Jörg Vaihinger	West Germany	46.23	q
5	Vladimir Prosin	Soviet Union	46.32	
6	Gusztáv Menczer	Hungary	46.40	

==== Heat 3 ====
Rank	Name	Nationality	Time	Notes
1	Derek Redmond	United Kingdom	45.75	Q
2	Ralf Lübke	West Germany	45.88	Q
3	Aleksandr Kurochkin	Soviet Union	46.18	Q
4	Aldo Canti	France	46.23	q
5	Ángel Heras	Spain	46.41	
6	Gerry Delaney	Ireland	46.88	

==== Heat 4 ====
Rank	Name	Nationality	Time	Notes
1	Thomas Schönlebe	East Germany	45.54	Q
2	Roberto Ribaud	Italy	45.69	Q
3	Yann Quentrec	France	45.77	Q
4	Arkadiy Kornilov	Soviet Union	46.09	q
5	Željko Knapić	Yugoslavia	47.81	
	Marcel Arnold	Switzerland	DQ	

== Participation ==
According to an unofficial count, 25 athletes from 13 countries participated in the event.

- East Germany (2)
- France (2)
- Hungary (1)
- Ireland (2)
- Italy (2)
- Netherlands (1)
- Soviet Union (3)
- Spain (2)
- Switzerland (1)
- Turkey (1)
- United Kingdom (3)
- West Germany (3)
- Yugoslavia (2)
