= 1987 IAAF World Indoor Championships – Men's 400 metres =

The men's 400 metres event at the 1987 IAAF World Indoor Championships was held at the Hoosier Dome in Indianapolis on 6 and 7 March.

== Medalists ==
Gold	Silver	Bronze
Antonio McKay; United States	Roberto Hernández; Cuba	Michael Franks; United States

== Results ==
=== Heats ===
The first 2 of each heat (Q) and next 4 fastest (q) qualified for the semifinals.

Rank	Heat	Name	Nationality	Time	Notes
1	3	Roberto Hernández	Cuba	46.57	Q
2	3	Arjen Visserman	Netherlands	46.73	Q, NR
3	3	John Anzrah	Kenya	46.96	q, NR
4	3	Allan Ingraham	Bahamas	46.96	q, NR
5	1	Antonio McKay	United States	47.33	Q
6	1	Paul Harmsworth	Great Britain	47.33	Q
7	4	Mark Henrich	West Germany	47.35	Q
8	1	Momchil Kharizanov	Bulgaria	47.44	q
9	3	Moses Ugbisie	Nigeria	47.47	q
10	4	Elvis Forde	Barbados	47.49	Q
11	2	Michael Franks	United States	47.54	Q
12	2	Ian Morris	Trinidad and Tobago	47.57	Q
13	2	Mauro Zuliani	Italy	47.67	
14	2	David Kitur	Kenya	47.90	
15	4	Sunday Uti	Nigeria	48.18	
16	4	Ahmed Abdelhalim Ghanem	Egypt	48.25	NR
17	2	Ahmed Hamada	Bahrain	49.15	
18	3	Lenford O'Garro	Saint Vincent and the Grenadines	49.84	NR
19	4	Dawda Jallow	Gambia	50.00	NR
20	1	Mohamed Nordin Jadi	Malaysia	50.34	NR
21	1	Isidro del Prado	Philippines	50.49	

=== Semifinals ===
First 3 of each semifinal (Q) qualified directly for the final.

Rank	Heat	Name	Nationality	Time	Notes
1	1	Ian Morris	Trinidad and Tobago	46.69	Q
2	2	Antonio McKay	United States	46.70	Q
3	1	Roberto Hernández	Cuba	46.74	Q
4	2	Michael Franks	United States	46.78	Q
5	1	Arjen Visserman	Netherlands	46.89	Q
6	1	Mark Henrich	West Germany	46.89	
7	2	Paul Harmsworth	Great Britain	46.97	Q
8	2	Allan Ingraham	Bahamas	47.06	
9	2	Momchil Kharizanov	Bulgaria	47.18	
10	1	John Anzrah	Kenya	47.35	
11	1	Moses Ugbisie	Nigeria	47.41	
12	2	Elvis Forde	Barbados	47.42	

=== Final ===
Rank	Lane	Name	Nationality	Time	Notes
1st place, gold medalist(s)	4	Antonio McKay	United States	45.98	
2nd place, silver medalist(s)	5	Roberto Hernández	Cuba	46.09	NR
3rd place, bronze medalist(s)	2	Michael Franks	United States	46.19	
4	3	Ian Morris	Trinidad and Tobago	46.57	
5	6	Paul Harmsworth	Great Britain	46.59	PB
6	1	Arjen Visserman	Netherlands	47.11	
