= 1990 European Athletics Championships – Men's 4 × 400 metres relay =

Men's 4 × 400 metres relay at the European Athletics Championships

These are the official results of the Men's 4 × 400 metres event at the 1990 European Championships in Split, Yugoslavia, held at Stadion Poljud on 31 August and 1 September 1990.

== Medalists ==
Gold	Paul Sanders; Kriss Akabusi; John Regis; Roger Black; United Kingdom
Silver	Klaus Just; Edgar Itt; Carsten Köhrbrück; Norbert Dobeleit; West Germany
Bronze	Rico Lieder; Karsten Just; Thomas Schönlebe; Jens Carlowitz; East Germany

== Results ==
=== Final ===
1 September

Rank	Nation	Competitors	Time	Notes
1st place, gold medalist(s)	United Kingdom	Paul Sanders; Kriss Akabusi; John Regis; Roger Black	2:58.22	AR
2nd place, silver medalist(s)	West Germany	Klaus Just; Edgar Itt; Carsten Köhrbrück; Norbert Dobeleit	3:00.64	
3rd place, bronze medalist(s)	East Germany	Rico Lieder; Karsten Just; Thomas Schönlebe; Jens Carlowitz	3:01.51	
4	Italy	Andrea Montanari; Vito Petrella; Roberto Ribaud; Andrea Nuti	3:01.78	
5	Yugoslavia	Nenad Đurović; Slobodan Popović; Ismail Mačev; Slobodan Branković	3:02.46	
6	Spain	Antonio Sánchez; Gaietà Cornet; Moises Fernández; José Luis Palacios	3:02.74	
7	France	Christophe Zapata; Stéphane Diagana; Patrick Barré; Olivier Noirot	3:03.33	
8	Soviet Union	Dmitriy Golovastov; Aleksey Bazarov; Vadim Zadoinov; Aivar Ojastu	3:04.17	

=== Heats ===
31 August

==== Heat 1 ====
Rank	Nation	Competitors	Time	Notes
1	Italy	Andrea Montanari; Alessandro Aimar; Fabio Grossi; Andrea Nuti	3:04.08	Q
2	United Kingdom	Brian Whittle; Kriss Akabusi; Paul Sanders; Phil Brown	3:04.32	Q
3	Soviet Union	Aleksey Petukhov; Aleksey Bazarov; Aivar Ojastu; Dmitriy Golovastov	3:04.74	Q
4	France	Olivier Noirot; Christophe Zapata; Patrick Barré; Stéphane Diagana	3:05.18	q
5	Poland	Mariusz Rządziński; Paweł Woźniak; Wojciech Lach; Tomasz Jędrusik	3:06.51	

==== Heat 2 ====
Rank	Nation	Competitors	Time	Notes
1	West Germany	Klaus Just; Ulrich Schlepütz; Jörg Vaihinger; Carsten Köhrbrück	3:03.89	Q
2	Yugoslavia	Dejan Jovković; Nenad Đurović; Ismail Mačev; Slobodan Popović	3:04.04	Q
3	East Germany	Jan Lenzke; Rico Lieder; Thomas Schönlebe; Jens Carlowitz	3:04.55	Q
4	Spain	Manuel Moreno; Antonio Sánchez; Moises Fernández; José Luis Palacios	3:05.90	q

== Participation ==
According to an unofficial count, 46 athletes from 9 countries participated in the event.

- East Germany (5)
- France (4)
- Italy (6)
- Poland (4)
- Soviet Union (5)
- Spain (5)
- United Kingdom (6)
- West Germany (6)
- Yugoslavia (5)

== See also ==
- 1988 Men's Olympic 4 × 400 m Relay (Seoul)
- 1991 Men's World Championships 4 × 400 m Relay (Tokyo)
- 1992 Men's Olympic 4 × 400 m Relay (Barcelona)
- 1993 Men's World Championships 4 × 400 m Relay (Stuttgart)
