= 1985 European Athletics Indoor Championships – Men's 400 metres =

The men's 400 metres event at the 1985 European Athletics Indoor Championships was held on 2 and 3 March.

== Medalists ==
Gold	Silver	Bronze
Todd Bennett; Great Britain	Klaus Just; West Germany	José Alonso; Spain

== Results ==
=== Heats ===
First 2 from each heat (Q) and the next 2 fastest (q) qualified for the semifinals.

Rank	Heat	Name	Nationality	Time	Notes
1	1	Todd Bennett	Great Britain	46.71	Q
2	2	Ángel Heras	Spain	46.83	Q
3	1	Andrzej Stępień	Poland	47.08	Q, PB
4	3	Klaus Just	West Germany	47.16	Q
5	1	Gusztáv Menczer	Hungary	47.20	q
6	3	Roberto Tozzi	Italy	47.26	Q
7	2	Roberto Ribaud	Italy	47.30	Q
8	3	Roger Black	Great Britain	47.36	q
9	4	Uwe Wegner	West Germany	47.37	Q
10	4	José Alonso	Spain	47.39	Q
11	1	Marcel Arnold	Switzerland	47.41	
12	4	Arjen Visserman	Netherlands	47.48	
13	2	Kriss Akabusi	Great Britain	47.58	
14	3	István Szabó	Hungary	47.66	
15	4	Athanassios Kalogiannis	Greece	47.76	
16	2	Jari Niemelä	Finland	47.91	
17	1	Andreas Rapek	Austria	48.05	
18	2	Ján Tomko	Czechoslovakia	48.06	

=== Semifinals ===
First 2 from each semifinal (Q) and the next 1 fastest (q) qualified for the final.

Rank	Heat	Name	Nationality	Time	Notes
1	1	Todd Bennett	Great Britain	46.45	Q
2	1	Klaus Just	West Germany	46.63	Q
3	2	Ángel Heras	Spain	46.70	Q
4	2	Roberto Tozzi	Italy	46.97	Q
5	1	José Alonso	Spain	46.98	q
6	1	Roberto Ribaud	Italy	47.18	
7	2	Andrzej Stępień	Poland	47.23	
8	1	Gusztáv Menczer	Hungary	47.38	
9	2	Roger Black	Great Britain	49.67	
	2	Uwe Wegner	West Germany	DNF	

=== Final ===
Rank	Lane		Nationality	Time	Notes
1st place, gold medalist(s)	3	Todd Bennett	Great Britain	45.56	WB
2nd place, silver medalist(s)	4	Klaus Just	West Germany	45.90	
3rd place, bronze medalist(s)	5	José Alonso	Spain	46.52	
4	1	Roberto Tozzi	Italy	46.66	
5	2	Ángel Heras	Spain	46.68	
