= 1991 IAAF World Indoor Championships – Men's 4 × 400 metres relay =

The men's 4 × 400 metres relay at the 1991 IAAF World Indoor Championships was held on 8 and 10 March. It was the first time that this event was contested at the World Indoor Championships.

== Medalists ==
Gold	Silver	Bronze
Germany; Rico Lieder; Jens Carlowitz; Karsten Just; Thomas Schönlebe	United States; Raymond Pierre; Charles Jenkins Jr. Andrew Valmon; Antonio McKay; Clifton Campbell*; Willie Smith*	Italy; Marco Vaccari; Vito Petrella; Alessandro Aimar; Andrea Nuti

* Runners who participated in the heats only and received medals.

== Results ==
=== Heats ===
First 2 teams of each heat (Q) and the next 2 fastest (q) qualified for the final.

Rank	Heat	Nation	Athletes	Time	Notes
1	1	United States	Clifton Campbell, Willie Smith, Andrew Valmon, Antonio McKay	3:05.53	Q, CR
2	2	Germany	Rico Lieder, Jens Carlowitz, Karsten Just, Thomas Schönlebe	3:07.39	Q
3	1	Italy	Marco Vaccari, Vito Petrella, Alessandro Aimar, Andrea Nuti	3:07.55	Q, NR
4	1	Soviet Union	Vyacheslav Kocheryagin, Dmitriy Golovastov, Vladimir Prosin, Valeriy Starodubtsev	3:08.05	q
5	2	Jamaica	Devon Morris, Evon Clarke, Anthony Price, Howard Burnett	3:08.92	Q, NR
6	2	Australia	Paul Greene, Mark Garner, Rohan Robinson, Steve Perry	3:09.30	q, AR
7	1	Spain	José Antonio Gay, José Alonso, Luis Cumellas, Miguel Cuesta	3:10.92	
	2	Trinidad and Tobago	Neil de Silva, Dazel Jules, Alvin Daniel, Ian Morris	DQ	

=== Final ===
Rank	Nation	Athletes	Time	Notes
1st place, gold medalist(s)	Germany	Rico Lieder, Jens Carlowitz, Karsten Just, Thomas Schönlebe	3:03.05	WR, CR
2nd place, silver medalist(s)	United States	Raymond Pierre, Charles Jenkins Jr., Andrew Valmon, Antonio McKay	3:03.24	AR
3rd place, bronze medalist(s)	Italy	Marco Vaccari, Vito Petrella, Alessandro Aimar, Andrea Nuti	3:05.51	NR
4	Australia	Paul Greene, Mark Garner, Rohan Robinson, Steve Perry	3:08.49	AR
5	Soviet Union	Vyacheslav Kocheryagin, Dmitriy Golovastov, Vladimir Prosin, Valeriy Starodubtsev	3:09.20	
6	Jamaica	Devon Morris, Lay Lynval, Evon Clarke, Howard Burnett	3:10.33	
