= 1989 European Athletics Indoor Championships – Men's 400 metres =

The men's 400 metres event at the 1989 European Athletics Indoor Championships was held on 18 and 19 February.

== Medalists ==
Gold	Silver	Bronze
Cayetano Cornet; Spain	Brian Whittle; Great Britain	Klaus Just; West Germany

== Results ==
=== Heats ===
First 2 from each heat (Q) and the next 2 fastest (q) qualified for the final.

Rank	Heat	Name	Nationality	Time	Notes
1	1	Cayetano Cornet	Spain	46.70	Q
2	2	Brian Whittle	Great Britain	46.75	Q
3	1	Klaus Just	West Germany	46.79	Q
4	1	Vito Petrella	Italy	47.16	q
5	2	Antonio Sánchez	Spain	47.25	Q
6	1	Todd Bennett	Great Britain	47.36	q
7	1	Aldo Canti	France	47.41	
8	2	Arjen Visserman	Netherlands	47.53	
9	2	Slobodan Branković	Yugoslavia	48.21	
	2	Momchil Kharizanov	Bulgaria	DQ	

=== Final ===
Rank	Name	Nationality	Time	Notes
1st place, gold medalist(s)	Cayetano Cornet	Spain	46.21	
2nd place, silver medalist(s)	Brian Whittle	Great Britain	46.49	
3rd place, bronze medalist(s)	Klaus Just	West Germany	46.80	
4	Todd Bennett	Great Britain	47.16	
5	Antonio Sánchez	Spain	47.45	
6	Vito Petrella	Italy	47.83	
