= 1986 European Athletics Indoor Championships – Men's 400 metres =

The men's 400 metres event at the 1986 European Athletics Indoor Championships was held on 22 and 23 February.

== Medalists ==
Gold	Silver	Bronze
Thomas Schönlebe; East Germany	José Alonso; Spain	Mathias Schersing; East Germany

== Results ==
=== Heats ===
The winner of each heat (Q) and the next 3 fastest (q) qualified for the semifinals.

Rank	Heat	Name	Nationality	Time	Notes
1	4	Arjen Visserman	Netherlands	47.43	Q
2	1	Thomas Schönlebe	East Germany	47.59	Q
3	4	Ismail Mačev	Yugoslavia	47.62	q
4	1	Steve Heard	Great Britain	47.64	q
5	2	Mathias Schersing	East Germany	47.92	Q
6	3	José Alonso	Spain	47.95	Q
7	4	Klaus Just	West Germany	48.02	q
8	2	Brian Whittle	Great Britain	48.04	
9	1	Momchil Kharizanov	Bulgaria	48.06	
10	3	Thomas Futterknecht	Austria	48.07	
11	2	Ángel Heras	Spain	48.22	
12	3	Vladimir Krylov	Soviet Union	48.35	
13	5	Andreas Rapek	Austria	48.75	Q
14	5	Jürgen Koffler	West Germany	48.83	
15	5	Timo Kiviniemi	Finland	49.21	
16	2	Jindrich Roun	Czechoslovakia	49.58	
	4	Dimitar Rangelov	Bulgaria	DNS	

=== Semifinals ===
First 2 from each semifinal qualified directly (Q) for the final.

Rank	Heat	Name	Nationality	Time	Notes
1	2	Thomas Schönlebe	East Germany	47.62	Q
2	1	Mathias Schersing	East Germany	47.75	Q
2	2	José Alonso	Spain	47.75	Q
4	2	Ismail Mačev	Yugoslavia	47.78	
5	1	Arjen Visserman	Netherlands	47.79	
6	1	Steve Heard	Great Britain	47.81	
7	1	Andreas Rapek	Austria	49.29	
	2	Klaus Just	West Germany	DNS	

=== Final ===
Rank	Lane	Name	Nationality	Time	Notes
1st place, gold medalist(s)	3	Thomas Schönlebe	East Germany	46.97	
2nd place, silver medalist(s)	4	José Alonso	Spain	47.12	
3rd place, bronze medalist(s)	2	Mathias Schersing	East Germany	47.59	
4	1	Arjen Visserman	Netherlands	47.69	
