= Ralf Lübke =

German sprinter (born 1965)

Medal record

Men's athletics

Representing West Germany

Olympic Games
Bronze medal – third place	1988 Seoul	4×400 m

European Championships
Silver medal – second place	1986 Stuttgart	4×400 m

Ralf Lübke (born 17 June 1965 in Mülheim an der Ruhr) is a retired West German athlete who specialized in the 200 metres.

== Biography ==
At the 1988 Summer Olympics held in Seoul, South Korea he helped win the 4 × 400 metres relay bronze medal with his teammates Norbert Dobeleit, Edgar Itt and Jörg Vaihinger. He had already finished fifth in the 1984 Olympic relay, won a relay silver medal at the 1986 European Championships and a bronze medal in 400 m at the 1988 European Indoor Championships.

His personal best time was 20.38 seconds, achieved in August 1985 in Stuttgart. This ranks him fifth among German 200 m sprinters, behind Tobias Unger, Frank Emmelmann, Sebastian Ernst, Eugen Ray and Jürgen Evers. In addition he ran the 400 metres in 44.98 seconds in July 1986 in Berlin. This ranks him tenth among German 400 m sprinters, behind Thomas Schönlebe, Erwin Skamrahl, Ingo Schultz, Karl Honz, Hartmut Weber, Mathias Schersing, Jens Carlowitz, Frank Schaffer and Harald Schmid.

== See also ==
- German all-time top lists - 200 metres
