= 1985 IAAF World Indoor Games – Men's 400 metres =

The men's 400 metres event at the 1985 IAAF World Indoor Games was held at the Palais Omnisports Paris-Bercy on 18 and 19 January.

== Medalists ==
Gold	Silver	Bronze
Thomas Schönlebe; East Germany	Todd Bennett; Great Britain	Mark Rowe; United States

== Results ==
=== Heats ===
First 2 of each heat (Q) and next 2 fastest (q) qualified for the semifinals.

Rank	Heat	Name	Nationality	Time	Notes
1	4	Todd Bennett	Great Britain	47.19	Q
2	5	Amadou Dia Ba	Senegal	47.55	Q
3	5	Phil Brown	Great Britain	47.60	Q
4	3	Mark Rowe	United States	47.70	Q
5	5	Carlos Reyté	Cuba	47.82	q
6	2	Ángel Heras	Spain	47.88	Q
7	2	Clarence Daniel	United States	47.96	Q
7	4	Allan Ellsworth	Netherlands	47.96	Q
9	4	Lázaro Martínez	Cuba	48.06	q
10	3	Arjen Visserman	Netherlands	48.12	Q
11	3	Allan Ingraham	Bahamas	48.14	
12	5	Isidro del Prado	Philippines	48.35	NR
13	4	Ahmed Abdelhalim Ghanem	Egypt	48.77	
14	3	Ahmed Hamada	Bahrain	48.80	NR
15	4	Abdelali Kasbane	Morocco	48.93	NR
16	1	Thomas Schönlebe	East Germany	48.95	Q
16	2	Ali St. Louis	Trinidad and Tobago	48.95	
18	1	René Djédjémel Mélédjé	Ivory Coast	49.36	Q
19	4	Djétenan Kouadio	Ivory Coast	49.45	
20	5	Gerry Delaney	Ireland	49.83	
21	2	Mike Okot	Uganda	50.19	
22	1	Aðalsteinn Bernhardsson	Iceland	50.37	
23	1	Khaled Hussain	Kuwait	50.50	NR
24	5	Alberto Izu	Peru	51.19	NR
	1	David Kitur	Kenya	DNS	
	1	David Peltier	Barbados	DNS	
	2	Nabil Nahri	Syria	DNS	
	3	Billy Konchellah	Kenya	DNS	
	3	Roberto Ribaud	Italy	DNS	

=== Semifinals ===
First 3 of each semifinal (Q) qualified directly for the final.

Rank	Heat	Name	Nationality	Time	Notes
1	2	Thomas Schönlebe	East Germany	46.62	Q
2	2	Todd Bennett	Great Britain	46.69	Q
3	2	Mark Rowe	United States	46.70	Q
4	1	Amadou Dia Ba	Senegal	47.86	Q
5	1	Ángel Heras	Spain	47.89	Q
6	1	Phil Brown	Great Britain	47.93	Q
7	1	Clarence Daniel	United States	48.01	
8	1	Arjen Visserman	Netherlands	48.08	
9	2	Allan Ellsworth	Netherlands	48.09	
10	1	Lázaro Martínez	Cuba	48.67	
11	2	René Djédjémel Mélédjé	Ivory Coast	49.09	
12	2	Carlos Reyté	Cuba	49.39	

=== Final ===
Rank	Name	Nationality	Time	Notes
1st place, gold medalist(s)	Thomas Schönlebe	East Germany	45.60	WB
2nd place, silver medalist(s)	Todd Bennett	Great Britain	45.97	NR
3rd place, bronze medalist(s)	Mark Rowe	United States	46.31	PB
4	Amadou Dia Ba	Senegal	46.94	NR
5	Phil Brown	Great Britain	47.84	
6	Ángel Heras	Spain	54.09	
