= Frank Möller (athlete) =

German sprinter (born 1960)

Frank Möller (born 16 February 1960) is a retired East German sprinter.

He finished fourth in the 4 × 400 metres relay at the 1988 Olympic Games, with teammates Jens Carlowitz, Mathias Schersing and Thomas Schönlebe.
