= Schersing =

Schersing is a surname. Notable people with the surname include:

- Mathias Schersing (born 1964), German sprinter
- Petra Schersing (born 1965), German sprinter
