= Carsten Köhrbrück =

German hurdler (born 1967)

Personal information
- Born: 19 November 1967 (age 58) Dortmund, West Germany

Sport
- Sport: Track and field
Medal record
Representing West Germany
European Championships
Silver medal – second place	1990 Split	4×400 m relay
Summer Universiade
Bronze medal – third place	1989 Duisburg	4x400 m relay

Carsten Uwe Köhrbrück (born 19 November 1967) is a retired German hurdler.

Köhrbrück was born in Dortmund. He won the bronze medal at the 1985 European Junior Championships. He won a silver medal in the 4 × 400 metres relay at the 1990 European Championships, with teammates Klaus Just, Edgar Itt and Norbert Dobeleit. He also finished sixth in the hurdles event. He later competed at the 1991 World Championships and the 1992 Summer Olympics without reaching the final.

His personal best time was 48.89 seconds, achieved in August 1990 in Düsseldorf. This ranks him seventh on the German all-time list, behind Harald Schmid, Olaf Hense, Edgar Itt, Uwe Ackermann, Thomas Goller and Volker Beck.

Köhrbrück represented the sports clubs OSC Berlin and LAC Halensee Berlin. He became German champion in 1990.
