= 1983 European Athletics Junior Championships =

- Level: Under 20
- Events: 38

The 1983 European Athletics Junior Championships was the seventh edition of the biennial athletics competition for European athletes aged under twenty. It was held in Schwechat, Austria between 25 and 28 August.

== Men's results ==
Event	Gold		Silver		Bronze	
100 metres	Lincoln Asquith (GBR)	10.34	Sergey Poduzdov (URS)	10.52	Max Morinière (FRA)	10.56
200 metres	Jürgen Evers (FRG)	20.37	Ralf Lübke (FRG)	20.50	Lincoln Asquith (GBR)	20.86
400 metres	Thomas Schönlebe (GDR)	45.64	Jens Carlowitz (GDR)	45.72	Klaus Just (FRG)	46.44
800 metres	Ikem Billy (GBR)	1:47.15	Piotr Piekarski (POL)	1:47.70	Alberto Barsotti (ITA)	1:48.44
1500 metres	Maik Dreissigacker (GDR)	3:40.79	Igor Lotorev (URS)	3:41.41	Raf Wijns (BEL)	3:41.75
3000 metres	Maik Dreissigacker (GDR)	8:03.18	Sergey Afanasyev (URS)	8:03.63	Sławomir Majusiak (POL)	8:03.69
5000 metres	Jonathan Richards (GBR)	13:56.41	Heiner Mebes (GDR)	14:02.76	Detlef Schwarz (FRG)	14:04.83
110 m hurdles	Jiří Hudec (TCH)	13.85	Sergey Usov (URS)	13.96	Paul Brice (GBR)	14.08
400 m hurdles	Ruslan Mishchenko (URS)	49.71	Vladimir Budko (URS)	50.05	Martin Briggs (GBR)	50.22
2000 m s'chase	Mykola Matyushenko (URS)	5:31.54	Burkhard Dahm (FRG)	5:33.88	Lorenzo Hidalgo (ESP)	5:36.86
10.000 m walk	Walter Arena (ITA)	42:16.44	Jacek Herok (POL)	42:58.95	Jos Martens (BEL)	43:01.97
4 × 100 m relay	West Germany (FRG); Norbert Dobeleit; Markus Klameth; Jürgen Evers; Ralf Lübke	39.25	Soviet Union (URS); Sergey Grishchenko; Andrijus Kornikas; Sergey Poduzdov; Aleksandr Knysh	39.73	Great Britain (GBR); Stephen Graham; Steve Eden; Elliot Bunney; Lincoln Asquith	39.83
4 × 400 m relay	East Germany (GDR); Mario Fischer; Mathias Schersing; Jens Carlowitz; Thomas Schönlebe	3:04.95	West Germany (FRG); Jürgen Gruber; Frank Seybold; Sven Mikisch; Klaus Just	3:05.77	Soviet Union (URS); Sergey Filipyev; Ruslan Mishchenko; Feliks Tatoyev; Vladimir Budko	3:06.45
High jump	Yuriy Sergiyenko (URS)	2.28 m	Evgeni Peyev (BUL)	2.21 m	Patrik Sjöberg (SWE)	2.21 m
Pole vault	Radion Gataullin (URS)	5.55 m	Aleksandr Grigoryev (URS)	5.45 m	Ryszard Kolasa (POL)	5.40 m
Long jump	Ron Beer (GDR)	7.93 m	Andreja Marinkovic (YUG)	7.86 m	Robert Emmiyan (URS)	7.83 m
Triple jump	Khristo Markov (BUL)	16.72 m	Artem Tsygankov (URS)	16.30 m	Claes Rahm (SWE)	16.27 m
Shot put	Oleg Zolotukhin (URS)	19.20 m	Mikhail Kulish (URS)	18.29 m	Richard Navara (TCH)	17.85 m
Discus throw	Yevgeniy Burin (URS)	55.94 m	Valeriy Murashov (URS)	55.22 m	Patrick Journoud (FRA)	53.64 m
Hammer throw	Sergey Dorozhon (URS)	74.28 m	Aleksandr Zeleznev (URS)	71.90 m	Marco Gerloff (GDR)	70.94 m
Javelin throw	Oleg Pakhol (URS)	80.88 m	Sergey Glebov (URS)	77.86 m	Klaus-Jorg Murawa (GDR)	74.84 m
Decathlon	Valter Külvet (URS)	7915 pts	Christian Schenk (GDR)	7607 pts	Vassiliy Potapenko (URS)	7465 pts

== Women's results ==
Event	Gold		Silver		Bronze	
100 metres	Natalya Pomoshchnikova (URS)	11.57	Simmone Jacobs (GBR)	11.59	Henrietta Kessebeh (GBR)	11.72
200 metres	Simone Schumann (GDR)	23.04	Valentina Bozhina (URS)	23.14	Simmone Jacobs (GBR)	23.28
400 metres	Petra Müller (GDR)	51.79	Gerda Haas (AUT)	52.59	Malinka Girova (BUL)	52.61
800 metres	Katrin Wühn (GDR)	2:00.25	Christine Wachtel (GDR)	2:00.42	Monika Bens (FRG)	2:01.29
1500 metres	Margareta Keszeg (ROM)	4:13.17	Pavlina Evro (ALB)	4:13.77	Yvonne Grabner (GDR)	4:14.00
3000 metres	Věra Nožičková (TCH)	9:19.56	Zita Agoston (HUN)	9:19.92	Marion Josefsen (NOR)	9:20.93
100 m hurdles	Susanne Losch (GDR)	13.22	Jeanette Kreisch (GDR)	13.26	Nathalie Byer (GBR)	13.46
400 m hurdles	Radostina Shtereva (BUL)	56.01	Kristina Jauch (GDR)	57.56	Marina Mironova (URS)	58.13
4 × 100 m relay	East Germany (GDR); Sabine Klaus; Simone Schumann; Ute Beck; Stefanie Jacob	44.12	Soviet Union (URS); Yelena Fyodorova; Natalya Pomoshchnikova; Yelena Fedosenko; Valentina Bozhina	44.44	Great Britain (GBR); Etta Kessebeh; Georgina Oladapo; Simmone Jacobs; Lisa Goreeph	44.86
4 × 400 m relay	East Germany (GDR); Frauke Jürgens; Sigrun Ludwigs; Petra Müller; Christine Wachtel	3:30.44	Bulgaria (BUL); Petya Strashilova; Yuliana Rasheva; Malina Girova; Radostina Shtereva	3:31.78	West Germany (FRG); Christine Wahl; Karin Lix; Annegret Ley; Nicole Leistenschneider	3:31.94
High jump	Yelena Topchina (URS)	1.94 m	Tamara Malešev (YUG)	1.88 m	Debbie Marti (GBR)	1.88 m
Long jump	Larissa Baluta (URS)	6.67 m	Monika Beyer (GDR)	6.53 m	Jana Sobotka (GDR)	6.48 m
Shot put	Heidi Krieger (GDR)	18.06 m	Valentina Fedyushina (URS)	17.01 m	Astrid Wagner (GDR)	16.89 m
Discus throw	Heidi Krieger (GDR)	60.14 m	Larissa Platonova (URS)	59.04 m	Irina Yefrosimina (URS)	57.40 m
Javelin throw	Natalya Chernyenko (URS)	62.04 m	Trine Solberg (NOR)	61.40 m	Jana Kopping (GDR)	59.08 m
Heptathlon	Sybille Thiele (GDR)	6421 pts	Sabine Braun (FRG)	6273 pts	Jana Sobotka (GDR)	6222 pts

== Medal table ==
Rank	Nation	Gold	Silver	Bronze	Total
1	East Germany (GDR)	14	7	7	28
2	Soviet Union (URS)	13	16	5	34
3	Great Britain (GBR)	3	1	9	13
4	West Germany (FRG)	2	4	4	10
5	Bulgaria (BUL)	2	2	1	5
6	Czechoslovakia (TCH)	2	0	1	3
7	Italy (ITA)	1	0	1	2
8	Romania (ROU)	1	0	0	1
9	Poland (POL)	0	2	2	4
10	Yugoslavia (YUG)	0	2	0	2
11	Norway (NOR)	0	1	1	2
12	Albania (ALB)	0	1	0	1
12	Austria (AUT)	0	1	0	1
12	Hungary (HUN)	0	1	0	1
15	Belgium (BEL)	0	0	2	2
15	France (FRA)	0	0	2	2
15	Sweden (SWE)	0	0	2	2
18	Spain (ESP)	0	0	1	1
Totals (18 entries)		38	38	38	114
