= Aleksandr Kurochkin =

Personal information
- Born: 23 July 1961 (age 65)
- Height: 1.92 m (6 ft 4 in)
- Weight: 79 kg (174 lb)

Sport
- Sport: Athletics
- Event: 400 metres
Medal record
Men's athletics
Representing Soviet Union
European Championships
| Bronze medal – third place | 1986 Stuttgart | 4×400 m relay |
Summer Universiade
| Gold medal – first place | 1981 Bucharest | 4x400 m relay |

Aleksandr Kurochkin (Cyrillic: Александр Курочкин; born 23 July 1961) is a retired Kazakhstani sprinter specialising in the 400 metres who competed for the Soviet Union. He took part at the 1987 World Championships reaching the semifinals. In addition, he won the bronze medal at the 1984 Friendship Games which were a competition for countries boycotting the 1984 Summer Olympics. He also won several medals with the Soviet 4 × 400 metres relay.

His personal bests in the event are 45.52 outdoors (Moscow 1984) and 47.86 seconds indoors (Moscow 1986). The first result is the standing Kazakhstani record.

== International competitions ==
| Year | Competition | Venue | Position | Event | Notes |
Representing the Soviet Union
| 1984 | Friendship Games | Moscow, Soviet Union | 3rd | 400 m | 45.52 |
| 1984 | Friendship Games | Moscow, Soviet Union | 1st | 4 × 400 m relay | 3:00.16 |
| 1986 | Goodwill Games | Moscow, Soviet Union | 5th | 400 m | 45.67 |
| 1986 | Goodwill Games | Moscow, Soviet Union | 1st | 4 × 400 m relay | 3:01.25 |
| 1986 | European Championships | Stuttgart, West Germany | 11th (sf) | 400 m | 46.01 |
| 1986 | European Championships | Stuttgart, West Germany | 3rd | 4 × 400 m relay | 3:00.47 |
| 1987 | World Championships | Rome, Italy | 15th (sf) | 400 m | 45.73 |
| 1987 | World Championships | Rome, Italy | 7th (sf) | 4 × 400 m relay | 3:01.61^{1} |

^{1}Did not finish in the final
