= Aldo Canti =

Olympic athlete

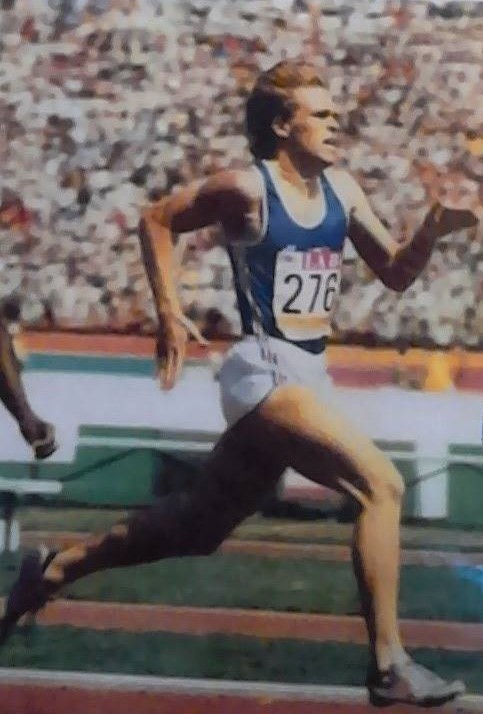

Personal information
- Born: 9 March 1961 (age 65) Montmorency, France
- Height: 1.85 m (6 ft 1 in)
- Weight: 80 kg (176 lb)

Sport
- Sport: Track and field
- Events: 200 metres, 400 metres
- Club: Stade Français; CESAME
Medal record
Representing France
Summer Universiade
Bronze medal – third place	1981 Bucharest	4x100m relay
Bronze medal – third place	1983 Edmonton	4x400m relay
Mediterranean Games
Gold medal – first place	1983 Casablanca	400m

Aldo Canti (born 9 March 1961 in Montmorency, France) is a French and later Sammarinese former sprinter who competed at the 1984 Summer Olympics and in the 1992 Summer Olympics.

== Competition record ==
Year	Competition	Venue	Position	Event	Notes
Representing France
1979	European Junior Championships	Bydgoszcz, Poland	7th	200 m	21.49
1979	European Junior Championships	Bydgoszcz, Poland	6th	4 × 400 m relay	40.79
1981	Universiade	Bucharest, Romania	4th (sf)	200 m	21.16
1981	Universiade	Bucharest, Romania	3rd	4 × 100 m relay	39.50
1982	European Championships	Athens, Greece	7th	4 × 400 m relay	3:04.73
1983	European Indoor Championships	Budapest, Hungary	9th (sf)	200 m	21.58
1983	Universiade	Edmonton, Canada	7th	400 m	46.15
1983	Universiade	Edmonton, Canada	3rd	4 × 400 m relay	3:04.89
1983	World Championships	Helsinki, Finland	33rd (h)	400 m	47.50
1983	World Championships	Helsinki, Finland	8th (sf)	4 × 400 m relay	3:05.09
1983	Mediterranean Games	Casablanca, Morocco	1st	400 m	45.29
1984	Olympic Games	Los Angeles, United States	11th (sf)	400 m	45.59
1984	Olympic Games	Los Angeles, United States	17th (h)	4 × 400 m relay	3:08.33
1985	World Cup	Canberra, Australia	7th	400 m	46.21^{1}
1986	European Championships	Stuttgart, West Germany	7th	400 m	45.93
1986	European Championships	Stuttgart, West Germany	8th	4 × 400 m relay	3:10.17
1987	European Indoor Championships	Liévin, France	5th (sf)	400 m	47.13
1987	World Championships	Rome, Italy	11th (sf)	4 × 400 m relay	3:03.41
1989	European Indoor Championships	The Hague, Netherlands	7th (h)	400 m	47.41
Representing San Marino
1991	Games of the Small States of Europe	Andorra la Vella, Andorra	3rd	200 m	21.22
1991	Games of the Small States of Europe	Andorra la Vella, Andorra	2nd	4 × 400 m relay	3:25.97
1991	Mediterranean Games	Athens, Greece	4th	200 m	21.02
1991	Mediterranean Games	Athens, Greece	7th	4 × 100 m relay	41.86
1992	European Indoor Championships	Genoa, Italy	23rd (h)	200 m	21.95
1992	Olympic Games	Barcelona, Spain	49th (h)	200 m	21.69
1992	Olympic Games	Barcelona, Spain	21st (h)	4 × 100 m relay	42.08
1993	Games of the Small States of Europe	Malta	2nd	4 × 100 m relay	

^{1}Representing Europe

== Personal bests ==
Outdoor

- 100 metres – 10.42 (+1.6 m/s, Montgeron 1987)
- 200 metres – 20.69 (+0.3 m/s, Villeneuve-d'Ascq 1984)
- 400 metres – 45.09 (Zürich 1984)

Indoor

- 200 metres – 21.50 (Budapest 1983)
- 400 metres – 47.13 (Liévin 1987)
