= Karsten Just =

German sprinter

Medal record

Men's athletics

Representing East Germany

European Championships
Bronze medal – third place	1990 Split	4×400 m

Karsten Just (born 17 September 1968, in Berlin) is a retired East German sprinter. He represented the sports club Berliner TSC.

== Achievements ==
Year	Competition	Venue	Position	Event	Notes
Representing East Germany
1990	European Championships	Split, Yugoslavia	3rd	4 × 400 m relay	3:01.51
Representing Germany
1991	World Indoor Championships	Seville, Spain	1st	4 × 400 m relay	3:03.05
1991	World Championships	Tokyo, Japan	6th	4 × 400 m relay	3:00.75
1993	World Championships	Stuttgart, Germany	3rd	4 × 400 m relay	2:59.99
