= Ismail Mačev =

Macedonian sprinter (1960–2019)

Personal information
- Born: 3 January 1960 Skopje, SR Macedonia, SFR Yugoslavia
- Died: 21 January 2019 (aged 59) Belgrade, Serbia
- Height: 1.67 m (5 ft 6 in)
- Weight: 61 kg (134 lb)

Sport
- Sport: Athletics
- Event: 400 metres
- Club: Crvena Zvezda
Medal record
Representing Yugoslavia
Summer Universiade
Silver medal – second place	1987 Zagreb	4x400m relay
Mediterranean Games
Silver medal – second place	1987 Latakia	400m
Silver medal – second place	1991 Athens	4x400m relay

Ismail Mačev (Macedonian: Исмаил Мачев; 3 January 1960 – 21 January 2019) was a Macedonian sprinter who competed for Yugoslavia in the 400 metres. He took part in the 1988 Summer Olympics as well as two World Championships. In addition, he won a silver medal at the 1987 Mediterranean Games.

== International competitions ==
Year	Competition	Venue	Position	Event	Notes
Representing Yugoslavia
1982	European Championships	Athens, Greece	10th (h)	4 × 400 m relay	3:08.44
1983	Mediterranean Games	Casablanca, Morocco	6th	400 m	46.27
1986	European Indoor Championships	Madrid, Spain	4th (sf)	400 m	47.78
1986	European Championships	Stuttgart, West Germany	22nd (h)	400 m	47.52
1987	European Indoor Championships	Liévin, France	12th (sf)	400 m	48.15
1987	Universiade	Zagreb, Yugoslavia	6th	400 m	46.17
1987	Universiade	Zagreb, Yugoslavia	2nd	4 × 400 m relay	3:03.95
1987	World Championships	Rome, Italy	29th (qf)	400 m	46.54
1987	World Championships	Rome, Italy	10th (sf)	4 × 400 m relay	3:03.30
1987	Mediterranean Games	Latakia, Syria	2nd	400 m	46.23
1988	Olympic Games	Seoul, South Korea	20th (h)	400 m	46.37
1988	Olympic Games	Seoul, South Korea	5th (sf)	4 × 400 m relay	3:01.59
1990	European Championships	Split, Yugoslavia	5th	4 × 400 m relay	3:02.46
1991	Mediterranean Games	Athens, Greece	2nd	4 × 400 m relay	3:03.74
1991	World Championships	Tokyo, Japan	4th	4 × 400 m relay	3:00.32

== Personal bests ==
Outdoors

- 200 metres – 21.5 (Skopje 1981)
- 400 metres – 45.83 (Ljubljana 1987)
- 800 metres – 1:47.46 (Sarajevo 1988)

Indoors

- 200 metres – 22.05 (Budapest 1987)
- 400 metres – 47.11 (Budapest 1990)

== Death ==
Mačev died of lung cancer on 21 January 2019 in Belgrade, Serbia.
