= Cayetano Cornet =

Spanish sprinter (born 1963)

Cayetano Cornet Pamies (Catalan: Gaietà Cornet Pàmies, born August 22, 1963) is a retired 400 metres runner from Spain. He was born in Reus, Catalonia.

He won the European Indoor Championships in 1986 as well as two World Indoor Championships bronze medals and one European Indoor Championships bronze medal.

== International competitions ==
| Year | Competition | Venue | Position | Event | Notes |
Representing Spain
| 1986 | Ibero-American Championships | Havana, Cuba | 3rd | 400 m | 47.03 |
| 1986 | Ibero-American Championships | Havana, Cuba | 1st | 4 × 400 m relay | 3:08.54 |
| 1987 | European Indoor Championships | Liévin, France | 11th (sf) | 400 m | 48.09 |
| 1987 | World Championships | Rome, Italy | 15th (sf) | 4 × 400 m relay | 3:06.41 |
| 1987 | Mediterranean Games | Latakia, Syria | 7th | 400 m | 47.24 |
| 1987 | Mediterranean Games | Latakia, Syria | 2nd | 4 × 400 m relay | 3:07.48 |
| 1988 | Ibero-American Championships | Mexico City, Mexico | 6th | 200 m | 21.01 (-0.3 m/s) A |
| 1988 | Ibero-American Championships | Mexico City, Mexico | 4th | 400 m | 45.62 A |
| 1988 | Ibero-American Championships | Mexico City, Mexico | — | 4 × 400 m relay | DNF |
| 1988 | Olympic Games | Seoul, South Korea | 17th (qf) | 400 m | 45.39 |
| 1989 | European Indoor Championships | The Hague, Netherlands | 1st | 400 m | 46.21 |
| 1989 | World Indoor Championships | Budapest, Hungary | 3rd | 400 m | 46.40 |
| 1989 | World Cup | Barcelona, Spain | 6th | 400 m | 45.61 |
| 1989 | World Cup | Barcelona, Spain | 8th | 4×400 m relay | 3:05.26 |
| 1990 | European Indoor Championships | Glasgow, United Kingdom | 3rd | 400 m | 46.01 |
| 1990 | European Championships | Split, Yugoslavia | 4th | 400 m | 45.30 |
| 1990 | European Championships | Split, Yugoslavia | 6th | 4 × 400 m relay | 3:02.74 |
| 1991 | World Indoor Championships | Seville, Spain | 3rd | 400 m | 46.52 |
| 1991 | World Championships | Tokyo, Japan | 25th (h) | 400 m | 46.54^{1} |
| 1992 | Ibero-American Championships | Seville, Spain | 4th | 4 × 400 m relay | 3:06.20 |
| 1992 | Olympic Games | Barcelona, Spain | 25th (qf) | 400 m | 46.27 |
| 1992 | Olympic Games | Barcelona, Spain | 12th (h) | 4 × 400 m relay | 3:04.60 |
| 1993 | World Indoor Championships | Toronto, Canada | 8th (sf) | 400 m | 47.12 |
| 1993 | World Championships | Stuttgart, Germany | 23rd (qf) | 400 m | 46.46 |

^{1}Did not start in the quarterfinals
