= Athletics at the 1983 Summer Universiade – Men's 4 × 400 metres relay =

The men's 4 × 400 metres relay event at the 1983 Summer Universiade was held at the Commonwealth Stadium in Edmonton on 8 and 9 July 1983.

== Results ==
=== Heats ===
Rank	Heat	Nation	Athletes	Time	Notes
1	2	United States	Sunder Nix, Eliot Tabron, Alonzo Babers, Cliff Wiley	3:06.32	Q
2	1	Soviet Union	Yevgeniy Lomtyev, Aleksandr Troshchilo, Sergey Kutsebo, Viktor Markin	3:08.29	Q
3	1	Canada	John Keay, Doug Hinds, Tim Bethune, Michael Sokolowski	3:08.50	Q
4	1	France	Yann Quentrec, Hector Llatser, Pascal Chichignoud, Aldo Canti	3:08.58	Q
5	1	Japan	Susumu Takano, Tomoharu Isobe, Hirofumi Koike, Koichi Mishiba	3:08.89	q
6	2	West Germany	Uwe Fegert, Thomas Geuyen, Uwe Wegner, Ulrich Karck	3:09.03	Q
7	2	Senegal	Moussa Fall, Babacar Niang, Amadou Dia Bâ, Boubacar Diallo	3:12.53	Q
8	2	Jamaica	Earle Laing, Lee Davis, Courtney Luke, Charles Hastings	3:13.10	q
9	2	Congo	Jean-Didace Bemou, Alphonse Mandonda, Joseph Mozengue, Ghislain Obounghat	3:18.44	
10	1	Angola	Jacinto Macamba, Gualberte Paquete, Armenio Gaspar, Luis Garrido	3:20.66	
	1	Cuba	Roberto Ramos, Héctor Herrera, Lázaro Martínez, Agustin Pavó	DNF	

=== Final ===
Rank	Nation	Athletes	Time	Notes
1st place, gold medalist(s)	United States	Sunder Nix, Eliot Tabron, Alonzo Babers, Cliff Wiley	3:01.24	
2nd place, silver medalist(s)	Soviet Union	Yevgeniy Lomtyev, Aleksandr Troshchilo, Sergey Kutsebo, Viktor Markin	3:01.58	
3rd place, bronze medalist(s)	France	Yann Quentrec, Hector Llatser, Pascal Chichignoud, Aldo Canti	3:04.89	
4	Japan	Susumu Takano, Tomoharu Isobe, Hirofumi Koike, Koichi Mishiba	3:05.28	
5	Canada	John Keay, Doug Hinds, Tim Bethune, Michael Sokolowski	3:05.95	
6	West Germany	Uwe Fegert, Thomas Geuyen, Uwe Wegner, Ulrich Karck	3:05.97	
7	Senegal	Moussa Fall, Babacar Niang, Amadou Dia Bâ, Boubacar Diallo	3:10.40	
8	Jamaica	Earle Laing, Lee Davis, Andrew Boyd, Charles Hastings	3:12.59	
