= Arjen Visserman =

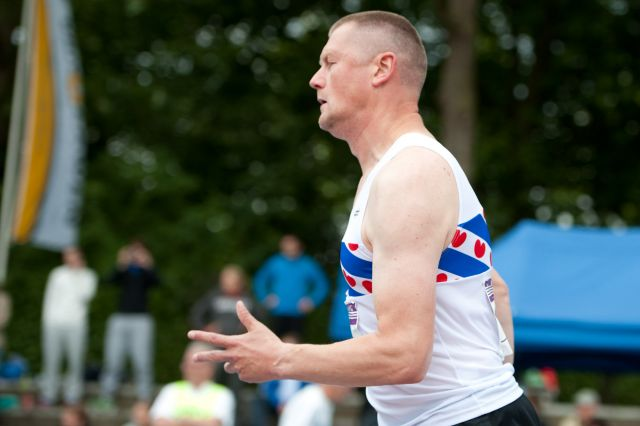
- Arjen Visserman in 2011

Personal information
- Born: 20 August 1965 (age 60) Uitwellingerga, Friesland, Netherlands

Sport
- Sport: Athletics
- Event: 400 metres

Arjen Visserman (born 20 August 1965) is a retired Dutch sprinter who specialised in the 400 metres. He represented his country at three World Indoor Championships.

== International competitions ==
Year	Competition	Venue	Position	Event	Notes
Representing the Netherlands
1983	European Junior Championships	Schwechat, Austria	19th (h)	800 m	1:53.47
1985	World Indoor Games	Paris, France	5th (sf)	400 m	48.08
1985	European Indoor Championships	Piraeus, Greece	12th (h)	400 m	47.48
1986	European Indoor Championships	Madrid, Spain	4th	400 m	47.69
1986	European Championships	Stuttgart, West Germany	16th (sf)	400 m	46.66
1987	European Indoor Championships	Liévin, France	4th	400 m	46.96
1987	World Indoor Championships	Indianapolis, United States	6th	400 m	47.11
1989	European Indoor Championships	The Hague, Netherlands	8th (h)	400 m	47.53
1989	World Indoor Championships	Budapest, Hungary	7th (sf)	400 m	46.94

== Personal bests ==
Outdoor

- 200 metres – 21.15 (Leiden 1987)
- 400 metres – 45.68 (Hengelo 1986) (ex-NR)

Indoor

- 200 metres – 21.79 (The Hague 1987)
- 400 metres – 46.73 (Indianapolis 1987) (ex-NR)
