= Yann Quentrec =

French sprinter (born 1962)

Personal information
- Full name: Yannick Quentrec
- Born: 17 February 1962 (age 64) Paris, France
- Height: 1.90 m (6 ft 3 in)
- Weight: 75 kg (165 lb)

Sport
- Country: France
- Sport: Athletics
- Event: 400 metres
- Club: Racing Club de France
Medal record
Men's athletics
Representing France
Summer Universiade
Bronze medal – third place	1983 Edmonton	4×400m relay

Yannick Quentrec (born 17 February 1962) is a French former sprinter who competed primarily in the 400 metres. He represented at the 1984 and 1992 Summer Olympics, as well as two World Championships.

== International competitions ==
Year	Competition	Venue	Position	Event	Notes
Representing France
1983	World Championships	Helsinki, Finland	8th (sf)	4 × 400 m relay	3:05.09
1984	Olympic Games	Los Angeles, United States	38th (h)	400 m	46.94
1984	Olympic Games	Los Angeles, United States	17th (h)	4 × 400 m relay	3:08.33
1986	European Indoor Championships	Madrid, Spain	17th (h)	200 m	23.09
1986	European Championships	Stuttgart, West Germany	9th (sf)	400 m	45.89
1986	European Championships	Stuttgart, West Germany	8th	4 × 400 m relay	3:10.17
1987	World Championships	Rome, Italy	35th (h)	400 m	46.78
1987	World Championships	Rome, Italy	11th (sf)	4 × 400 m relay	3:03.41
1992	Olympic Games	Barcelona, Spain	11th (h)	4 × 400 m relay	3:04.25

== Personal bests ==
Outdoor

- 200 metres – 20.96 (-0.6 m/s, Dijon 1986)
- 400 metres – 45.47 (Cologne 1986)

Indoor

- 200 metres – 23.09 (Madrid 1986)
