= Ian Morris (athlete) =

Trinidad and Tobago sprinter

Personal information
- Born: 20 November 1961 (age 64) Siparia, Trinidad and Tobago

Sport
- Sport: Track and field
Medal record
Representing Trinidad and Tobago
World Indoor Championships
Silver medal – second place	1989 Budapest	400m
Silver medal – second place	1993 Toronto	4x400m relay
Commonwealth Games
Bronze medal – third place	1994 Victoria	4x400m relay
Pan American Games
Silver medal – second place	1991 Havana	400m
Bronze medal – third place	1995 Mar del Plata	4x400m relay
Central American and Caribbean Games
Silver medal – second place	1986 Santiago	400m
Silver medal – second place	1986 Santiago	4x400m relay
Silver medal – second place	1993 Ponce	4x400m relay

Ian "Frinty" Morris (born 30 November 1961) is a retired male track and field athlete from Trinidad and Tobago who specialized in the 400 metres. A former soccer player for the Siparia Angels in South Trinidad, he did not take up athletics until the age of 23. He occasionally ran the 200 metres, and even competed in the 800 metres at the 1987 World Indoor Championships. He is now a member of the Siparia Rhythm Section.He is also the Coach of the Siparia Athletics Club.

Morris competed for the Abilene Christian Wildcats track and field team in the NCAA.

His personal best time was 44.21 seconds, achieved in the semifinal of the 1992 Olympics. The result gives him 23rd place on the all-time performers list. At 44.21, for 24 years he held the Trinidad and Tobago record which was eventually broken by Machel Cedenio in the 2016 Rio Olympics in a time of 44.01.

== International competitions ==
Year	Competition	Venue	Position	Event	Notes
Representing Trinidad and Tobago
1985	World Cup	Canberra, Australia	6th	4 × 400 m relay	3:03.52^{1}
1986	Central American and Caribbean Games	Santiago, Dominican Republic	2nd	400 m	45.02
1986	Central American and Caribbean Games	Santiago, Dominican Republic	5th	4 × 100 m relay	40.38
1986	Central American and Caribbean Games	Santiago, Dominican Republic	2nd	4 × 400 m relay	3:04.57
1987	World Indoor Championships	Indianapolis, United States	4th	400 m	46.57
1987	World Indoor Championships	Indianapolis, United States	24th (h)	800 m	2:03.82
1987	Central American and Caribbean Championships	Caracas, Venezuela	3rd	400 m	45.90
1987	Pan American Games	Indianapolis, United States	4th	400 m	45.53
1987	World Championships	Rome, Italy	33rd (h)	200 m	21.36
1987	World Championships	Rome, Italy	43rd (h)	400 m	48.06
1988	Olympic Games	Seoul, South Korea	7th	400 m	44.95
1989	World Indoor Championships	Budapest, Hungary	16th (h)	200 m	22.19
1989	World Indoor Championships	Budapest, Hungary	2nd	400 m	46.09
1991	World Indoor Championships	Seville, Spain	1st (h)	400 m	47.03^{2}
1991	World Indoor Championships	Seville, Spain	–	4 × 400 m relay	DQ
1991	Pan American Games	Havana, Cuba	2nd	400 m	45.24
1991	Pan American Games	Havana, Cuba	4th	4 × 400 m relay	3:06.91
1991	World Championships	Tokyo, Japan	6th	400 m	45.12
1992	Olympic Games	Barcelona, Spain	4th	400 m	44.25
1992	Olympic Games	Barcelona, Spain	7th	4 × 400 m relay	3:03.31
1993	World Indoor Championships	Toronto, Canada	24th (h)	400 m	49.91
1993	World Indoor Championships	Toronto, Canada	2nd	4 × 400 m relay	3:07.02
1993	World Championships	Stuttgart, Germany	18th (qf)	400 m	45.90^{3}
1993	Central American and Caribbean Games	Ponce, Puerto Rico	4th	400 m	46.33
1993	Central American and Caribbean Games	Ponce, Puerto Rico	2nd	4 × 400 m relay	3:06.96
1994	Commonwealth Games	Victoria, Canada	3rd	4 × 400 m relay	3:02.78
1995	Pan American Games	Mar del Plata, Argentina	4th	400 m	45.75
1995	Pan American Games	Mar del Plata, Argentina	3rd	4 × 400 m relay	3:02.24

^{1}Representing the Americas
^{2}Did not finish in the semifinals
^{3}Did not start in the semifinals

Olympic Games
Preceded by Hasely Crawford	Flagbearer for Trinidad and Tobago; Seoul 1988	Succeeded by Alvin Daniel
