= Lenford O'Garro =

Vincentian sprinter

Personal information
- Born: 1 June 1965 (age 61)

Sport
- Country: Saint Vincent and the Grenadines
- Sport: Athletics

Lenford Leon O'Garro (born 1 June 1965) is a sprinter from Saint Vincent and the Grenadines who competed at the 1992 Summer Olympics in Barcelona, Spain and also in two IAAF World Championships in Athletics.

== Career ==
O'Garro aged just 18 years old competed for the Saint Vincent and the Grenadines at the 1983 World Championships in Athletics in Helsinki, he competed in the 400 metres and ran in a time of 50.25 seconds and came 7th of the seven starts so didn't qualify for the next round. Four years later O'Garro competed in two events at the 1987 IAAF World Indoor Championships held in Indianapolis, United States, in the 200 metres he broke the National record running in a time of 22.65 seconds and coming in 22nd place thus not qualifying for the next round, he also competed in the 400 metres and finished 18th but again broke the National record in a time of 49.84 seconds. Later that year he competed in his second World Championships and again competing in the 400 metres, he ran a time of 49.19 seconds and came last in his heat.

Four years later he was picked for the Saint Vincent and the Grenadines Olympic team to compete in the 4 x 400 metres relay, with team-mates Michael Williams, Eversley Linley and Eswort Coombs they ran in a time of 3:10.21 and finished seventh in their heat and 19th overall out of the 24 teams that started. Even though O'Garro was only 27 years and 68 days old when he competed at the 1992 Summer Olympics he is still the oldest Vincentian to have competed at the Summer Olympics.
