= Roddie Haley =

American sprinter (1964–2022)

Personal information
- Full name: Roddie Witzasky Haley
- Nationality: American
- Born: December 6, 1964 Texarkana, Texas, U.S.
- Died: February 17, 2022 (aged 57) Texarkana, Texas, U.S.

Sport
- Sport: Athletics
- Event: Sprint
- College team: Arkansas Razorbacks

Achievements and titles
- Personal best: 400 m – 44.48s (1986)
Medal record
Representing the United States
World Championships
Gold medal – first place	1987 Rome	4 × 400 m relay
Pan American Games
Gold medal – first place	1987 Indianapolis	4 × 400 m relay
USA Outdoor Track and Field Championships
Silver medal – second place	1986 Eugene	400 m
Silver medal – second place	1987 San Jose	400 m
Bronze medal – third place	1985 Indianapolis	400 m
NCAA Division I Outdoor Track and Field Championships
Gold medal – first place	1985 Austin	400 m
Gold medal – first place	1986 Indianapolis	500 m
Gold medal – first place	1987 Baton Rouge	500 m

Roddie Witzasky Haley (December 6, 1964 – February 17, 2022) was an American sprinter.

== Biography ==
Haley ran on the American 4 × 400 m relay team at the 1987 Pan American Games and 1987 World Championships, winning gold medals at both events. He also finished eighth in the individual 400 metres at the 1987 World Championships.

He was an NCAA 400 meter champion as a freshman in college at the University of Arkansas, with a time of 44.20 seconds. Haley was also a nine-time All-American (four indoor, five outdoor) for coach John McDonnell, and one of the Razorbacks’ top performers both on the indoor and outdoor ovals.

Haley was also a three-time NCAA champion, including twice in the indoor 500 meters (1986–87) and once in the outdoor 400 meters (1985). He earned SWC titles indoors in the 440 yard dash (1985) and 600 yard dash (1987), and was a three-time SWC outdoor champion in the 400 meters (1985–87). Haley further captured a SWC title at the conference outdoor meet in 1985 in the 4 × 100 meter relay. He remains the outdoor 400 meter record holder with a time of 44.48 set in 1986. Haley was part of four SWC and four NCAA team championships in his three seasons, including contributing to the first national triple crown in school history in 1985.

Haley was inducted into the University of Arkansas Hall of Honors on September 2, 2016. He died on February 17, 2022, at the age of 57.
