= Ángel Heras =

Spanish sprinter (born 1958)

Personal information
- Born: 18 September 1958 (age 67) Zamora, Spain
- Height: 1.77 m (5 ft 10 in)
- Weight: 67 kg (148 lb)

Sport
- Sport: Athletics
- Event(s): 200 m, 400 m

Ángel Valentín de las Heras Lázaro (born 18 September 1958 in Zamora) is a retired Spanish sprinter who competed in the 200 and 400 metres. He represented his country at the 1984 and 1992 Summer Olympics as well as two World Championships, in 1983 and 1987.

== International competitions ==
Year	Competition	Venue	Position	Event	Notes
Representing Spain
1975	European Junior Championships	Athens, Greece	3rd	4 × 100 m relay	40.52
1979	Mediterranean Games	Split, Yugoslavia	7th	200 m	21.63
1979	Mediterranean Games	Split, Yugoslavia	5th	4 × 100 m relay	41.33
1979	Mediterranean Games	Split, Yugoslavia	4th	4 × 400 m relay	3:11.20
1982	European Indoor Championships	Milan, Italy	11th (h)	200 m	21.71
1982	European Championships	Athens, Greece	14th (h)	200 m	21.37
1982	European Championships	Athens, Greece	–	4 × 400 m relay	DNF
1983	European Indoor Championships	Budapest, Hungary	3rd	400 m	46.57
1983	World Championships	Helsinki, Finland	22nd (qf)	200 m	21.25
1983	World Championships	Helsinki, Finland	–	400 m	DQ
1983	World Championships	Helsinki, Finland	15th (sf)	4 × 400 m relay	3:09.68
1983	Mediterranean Games	Casablanca, Morocco	7th	400 m	46.57
1983	Mediterranean Games	Casablanca, Morocco	3rd	4 × 400 m relay	3:06.54
1983	Ibero-American Championships	Barcelona, Spain	3rd	100 m	10.65
1983	Ibero-American Championships	Barcelona, Spain	2nd	200 m	21.09
1983	Ibero-American Championships	Barcelona, Spain	1st	4 × 100 m relay	40.40
1983	Ibero-American Championships	Barcelona, Spain	3rd	4 × 400 m relay	3:08.17
1984	Olympic Games	Los Angeles, United States	19th (qf)	400 m	45.88
1984	Olympic Games	Los Angeles, United States	18th (h)	4 × 400 m relay	3:08.79
1985	World Indoor Games	Paris, France	6th	400 m	54.09
1985	European Indoor Championships	Piraeus, Greece	5th	400 m	46.68
1985	World Cup	Canberra, Australia	4th	4 × 400 m relay	3:01.46^{1}
1986	European Indoor Championships	Madrid, Spain	11th (h)	400 m	48.22
1986	European Championships	Stuttgart, West Germany	19th (h)	400 m	46.41
1986	European Championships	Stuttgart, West Germany	5th	4 × 400 m relay	3:04.12
1987	World Championships	Rome, Italy	12th (sf)	4 × 100 m relay	39.74
1987	World Championships	Rome, Italy	15th (sf)	4 × 400 m relay	3:06.41
1988	European Indoor Championships	Budapest, Hungary	12th (sf)	400 m	47.70
1988	Ibero-American Championships	Mexico City, Mexico	3rd^{2}	400 m hurdles	46.49
1988	Ibero-American Championships	Mexico City, Mexico	—	4 × 400 m relay	DNF
1992	Olympic Games	Barcelona, Spain	12th (h)	4 × 400 m relay	3:04.60

^{1}Representing Europe
^{2}Extra race

== Personal bests ==
Outdoor

- 200 metres – 20.95 (+0.2 m/s, Granada 1988)
- 400 metres – 45.54 (Milano 1984)

Indoor

- 200 metres – 21.71 (Milano 1982)
- 400 metres – 46.57 (Budapest 1983)
