= Mark Rowe (sprinter) =

American sprinter (born 1960)

Personal information
- Nationality: American
- Born: July 28, 1960 (age 65)

Sport
- Sport: Athletics
- Event: Sprints/400m

Mark Rowe (born July 28, 1960) is an American former sprinter.

Rowe competed for the Jackson State Tigers track and field team in the NCAA. In 1990, he was suspended two years for a positive drug test.

Rowe finished third behind Darren Clark in the 400 metres event at the British 1985 AAA Championships.
