= Antonio McKay =

American track and field athlete

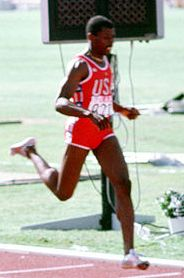
- McKay at the 1984 Olympics

Personal information
- Born: February 9, 1964 (age 62) Atlanta, Georgia, U.S.
Medal record
Men's athletics
Representing the United States
Olympic Games
Gold medal – first place	1984 Los Angeles	4 × 400 m relay
Gold medal – first place	1988 Seoul	4 × 400 m relay
Bronze medal – third place	1984 Los Angeles	400 m
World Championships
Gold medal – first place	1987 Rome	4x400 m relay
World Indoor Championships
Gold medal – first place	1987 Indianapolis	400 m
Gold medal – first place	1989 Budapest	400 m
Silver medal – second place	1991 Seville	4 × 400 m relay

Antonio McKay Sr. (born February 9, 1964) is an American former track and field athlete who specialized in the 400 meters.

== Career ==
He won All-American honours competing for Georgia Tech and was the NCAA champion both indoors and outdoors in 1984. He won at the United States Olympic Track Trials thus qualifying for the 1984 US Olympic Team. At the 1984 Los Angeles Olympics, he won the bronze medal in the 400 m behind Alonzo Babers and Gabriel Tiacoh. He teamed up with Babers in the 4 × 400-meter relay event and he led the team home to victory, winning his first Olympic gold medal.

He won 400 m gold medals at the 1986 Goodwill Games in Moscow and at the 1987 IAAF World Indoor Championships in Indianapolis. He ran at the 1987 World Championships in Athletics, but was eliminated in the quarter-finals. However, he won a gold medal in the relay with his compatriots Danny Everett, Roddie Haley and Butch Reynolds. He ran in the relay heats at the 1988 Summer Olympics and received a gold medal for his contribution as the American runners won in the final. He retained his 400 m indoor title at the 1989 IAAF World Indoor Championships, setting a championship record of 45.59 seconds in the process.

In 1989, McKay became the first Black track and field athlete to compete for the New York Athletic Club, which had historically banned Blacks and Jews from membership.

He failed a doping test in 1990 for the banned stimulant phenylpropanolamine. After initially being banned for three months, the ban was overturned on the defense that neither McKay nor the doctor who had prescribed him a flu remedy where aware that the banned substance was contained in the medicine.

His final international medal came at the 1991 IAAF World Indoor Championships, where he won the silver in the men's relay. McKay retired from competition around 1994. He remains the joint United States and Panamerican record holder in the rarely competed indoor 4 × 200 m relay, which he set in 1991 in Glasgow, Scotland alongside Thomas Jefferson, Raymond Pierre and Kevin Little.

He now works as a track coach at North Springs High School, a public high school in Sandy Springs, Georgia. Following the murder of McKay's sister, he has raised her two sons.

Coached the Dunwoody High School Girls Track and Field 5AAAAA Team to the State Championships for the 2012–2013 Season.

== Achievements ==
- 1984 Indoor World Record Holder,
- 1984 NCAA Indoor Champion,
- 1984 NCAA Outdoor Champion,
- 1984 Olympic Trials Champion,
- 1984 Olympic – Gold & Bronze Medalist,
- 1985 Indoor USA Track and Field Champion,
- 1986 Goodwill Games – Gold Medalist,
- 1987 Indoor USA Track & Field Champion,
- 1987 Indoor World Record Holder,
- 1988 Indoor USA Track & Field Champion,
- 1989 World Indoor Championships – Gold Medalist,
- 1990 Indoor USA Track & Field Champion,
- 1991 Indoor World Championships – Silver Medalist,
- 1993 Indoor USA Track & Field Champion,
