= Paul Harmsworth =

British sprinter (born 1963)

Personal information
- Nationality: British (English)
- Born: 28 September 1963 (age 62) Ealing, London, England

Sport
- Sport: Athletics
- Event: 400m
- Club: Team Solent

Paul Anthony Harmsworth (born 28 September 1963) is a British former sprinter who competed at the 1988 Summer Olympics.

== Biography ==
Harmsworth was a medallist at the 1987 European Athletics Indoor Championships, coming third in the 400 metres, and finished in fifth place at the 1987 IAAF World Indoor Championships, where he was number one European. Nationally, he was the British indoor champion that same year. He was the 1980 British youth champion in 1980. He also set British and Commonwealth indoor records in the 4 × 400 m in 1987, and outdoors in the 4 × 200 m in 1988.

Harmsworth represented Great Britain and Northern Ireland at the 1988 Olympic Games in the 4 × 400 m relay, running in the preliminary round as the British team (with Brian Whittle, Kriss Akabusi, Todd Bennett, and Phil Brown running in the final) finished fifth.
