= Raymond Pierre =

American sprinter

Personal information
- Born: September 19, 1967 (age 58) Washington, D.C., United States
Medal record
Men's athletics
Representing the United States
Pan American Games
Gold medal – first place	1987 Indianapolis	400 metres
Gold medal – first place	1987 Indianapolis	4 × 400 m relay
World Championships
Gold medal – first place	1987 Rome	4 x 400 m relay
World Indoor Championships
Silver medal – second place	1991 Seville	4 x 400 m relay
Summer Universiade
Gold medal – first place	1987 Zagreb	4 x 400 m relay
Silver medal – second place	1989 Duisburg	4 x 400 m relay
Bronze medal – third place	1987 Zagreb	400 metres

Raymond Pierre (born September 19, 1967) is a former American track and field athlete, who competed in the sprinting events during his career. Pierre won the 1989 NCAA 400 meters running for Baylor University. He is best known for winning the men's 400-meter dash event at the 1987 Pan American Games.

He also won silver medals in the 4 × 400 m relay at the 1989 IAAF World Cup (with Antonio Pettigrew among others) and at the 1991 IAAF World Indoor Championships alongside Charles Jenkins, Andrew Valmon and Antonio McKay. He was the alternate relay runner at the 1987 World Championships in Athletics, helping the United States team qualify into the final with a championship record of 2:59.06 minutes, which the team later improved upon in their gold medal winning run.

Pierre is also recognized as an outstanding track starter having served in that position for many years for the NCAA Championships, Big 12 Conference Championships, Baylor's Michael Johnson Invitational and the Texas Relays, among other Meets.
