= Mark Senior =

Jamaican sprinter

Personal information
- Nationality: Jamaican
- Born: 13 December 1963 (age 62)

Sport
- Sport: Sprinting
- Event: 400 metres

Mark Senior (born 13 December 1963) is a Jamaican sprinter. He competed in the men's 400 metres at the 1984 Summer Olympics.

Senior competed for the Arizona State Sun Devils track and field team in Tempe, Arizona.
