= Gabriel Tiacoh =

Ivorian sprinter

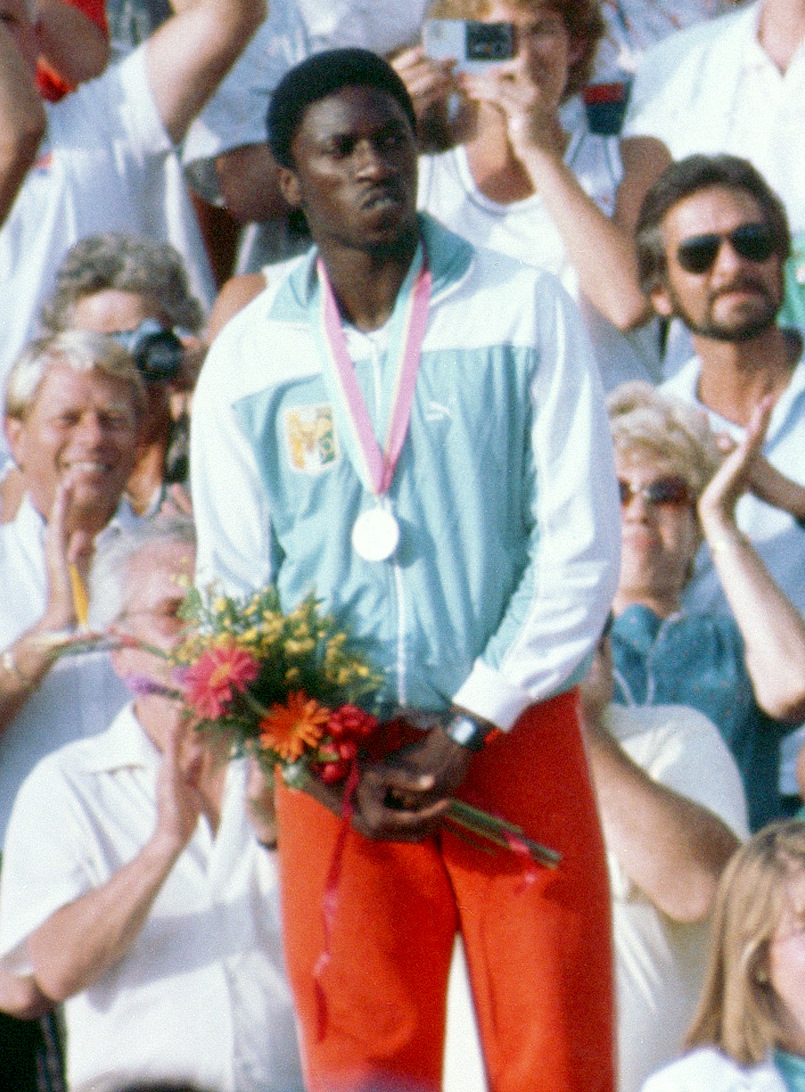
- Tiacoh in 1984

Personal information
- Nationality: Ivorian
- Born: September 10, 1963 Abidjan, Ivory Coast
- Died: April 2, 1992 (aged 29) Atlanta, Georgia, USA
- Height: 180 cm (5 ft 11 in)
- Weight: 75 kg (165 lb)

Sport
- Sport: Athletics
- Event: 400m
- Club: Washington State Cougars
Medal record
Men's athletics
Representing Ivory Coast
Summer Olympics
Silver medal – second place	1984 Los Angeles	400 m
African Championships
Gold medal – first place	1984 Rabat	400 m
Gold medal – first place	1989 Lagos	400 m
Silver medal – second place	1984 Rabat	4×100 m
Silver medal – second place	1985 Cairo	400 m
Silver medal – second place	1988 Annaba	400 m
Silver medal – second place	1988 Annaba	4×400 m

Gabriel Tiacoh (September 10, 1963 – April 2, 1992) was a sprinter from Côte d'Ivoire who specialised in the 400 metres. He is best known for winning his nation's first Olympic medal, in the 400 meters in 1984.

A former African record holder, he was the African champion over the distance in 1984 and 1989, as well as being the silver medallist in 1985 and 1988. He competed at the World Championships in Athletics in 1983 and 1987, finishing seventh in the 400 m final at the latter edition. He represented Côte d'Ivoire at the Olympics for a second time at the 1988 Seoul Games, but did not make the final.

He died of tuberculous meningitis in 1992 in Atlanta, Georgia at the age of 28. He had a personal best of 44.30 seconds for the 400 m.

== Career ==
He took part in the inaugural World Championships in Athletics, and was knocked out in the quarter-final stage of the men's 400 m. In 1984 he started by winning the 400 metres event at the African Championships in Athletics in Rabat. A few weeks later, at the Olympic Games, he managed to win the silver medal with 44.54 seconds, a new African record. At 20 years of age, Tiacoh had become the first Olympic medal winner from a West African country. He also ran in the 4×400 metres relay at the competition, but the men's team (including Georges Kablan Degnan, Avognan Nogboun and René Djédjémel Mélédjé) was knocked out in the semi-finals.

He lost his continental 400 m title to Innocent Egbunike at the 1985 African Championships in Athletics, although Tiacoh still managed to win a silver medal. The following year he improved his African 400 m record twice; first with a run of 44.32, then another of 44.30 seconds (which was the fastest by any athlete that season). He also managed to become the NCAA champion that year for the Washington State Cougars track and field team. Tiacoh ran at the 1987 World Championships in Athletics and easily progressed through the heats to the final. However, he only managed to finish in seventh place in the 400 m final as he could not match his previous form (his semi-final time of 44.69 s would have been enough to gain the bronze).

Tiacoh won the British AAA Championships title in the 400 metres event at the 1987 AAA Championships.

At the 1988 African Championships in Athletics, he was again beaten into second place by Egbunike. The Côte d'Ivoire team managed a silver medal in the relay event. Tiacoh represented his country at the Olympics for a second time, but he could not repeat his medal success and was eliminated in the quarter-finals after finishing in fifth place. He helped the Ivorian relay team to the Olympic semi-final, but they finished in sixth position and did not qualify for the final.

His final year of major competitions was 1989: he regained his 400 m African title at the 1989 African Championships in Athletics and also won a gold medal at the first Jeux de la Francophonie. Representing Africa at the 1989 IAAF World Cup, he finished third in the 400 m for the bronze medal.

Tiacoh died in 1992 in Atlanta of tuberculous meningitis caused by miliary tuberculosis at the age of 29. He remains the 400 m national record holder for Côte d'Ivoire.

He had an annual track and field meeting named in his honour – the Gabriel Tiacoh meet in Abidjan.

== Achievements ==
Year	Competition	Venue	Position	Event
Representing Ivory Coast
1983	World Championships	Helsinki, Finland	5th (quarter-final)	400 m
1983	World Championships	Helsinki, Finland	5th (heats)	4 × 100 m relay
1983	World Championships	Helsinki, Finland	7th (heats)	4 × 400 m relay
1984	African Championships	Rabat, Morocco	1st	400 m
1984	Olympic Games	Los Angeles, California	2nd	400 m
1984	Olympic Games	Los Angeles, California	6th (semi-finals)	4 × 400 m relay
1985	African Championships	Cairo, Egypt	2nd	400 m
1987	World Championships	Rome, Italy	7th	400 m
1988	African Championships	Annaba, Algeria	2nd	400 m
1988	Summer Olympics	Seoul, South Korea	5th (quarter-finals)	400 m
1988	Summer Olympics	Seoul, South Korea	6th (semi-finals)	4 × 400 m relay
1989	African Championships	Lagos, Nigeria	1st	400 m
1989	IAAF World Cup	Barcelona, Spain	3rd	400 m
1989	Jeux de la Francophonie	Casablanca, Morocco	1st	400m

== Trivia ==
- In the comedy sketch show Little Britain, Denver Mills (David Walliams) claims to have the silver medal won by Tiacoh at the 1984 Summer Olympics, however this is not mentioned in the show. (The comedy arises from the fact that people do not appreciate his achievement as much as he would like.)
