= Mark Henrich =

German sprinter (born 1961)

Personal information
- Nationality: German
- Born: 22 July 1961 (age 65) Attendorn, West Germany

Sport
- Sport: Sprinting
- Event: 4 × 400 metres relay
Medal record
Representing West Germany
Olympic Games
Bronze medal – third place	1988 Seoul	4 × 400 m relay
Summer Universiade
Bronze medal – third place	1989 Duisburg	4 x 400 m relay

Markus Antonius "Mark" Henrich (born 22 July 1961) is a German sprinter. He competed in the men's 4 × 400 metres relay at the 1988 Summer Olympics, representing West Germany.
