= Jens Carlowitz =

East German sprinter (born 1964)

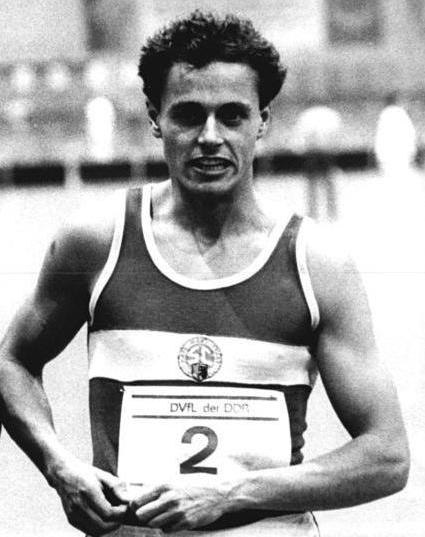
- Jens Carlowitz in 1988

Medal record

Men's athletics

Representing East Germany

European Championships
Bronze medal – third place	1990 Split	400 m
Bronze medal – third place	1990 Split	4×400 m

Jens Carlowitz (born 8 August 1964 in Karl-Marx-Stadt) is a retired East German sprinter.

His personal best time was 44.86 seconds, achieved at the 1989 World Cup in Barcelona. This places him seventh on the German all-time list, behind Thomas Schönlebe, Erwin Skamrahl, Ingo Schultz, Karl Honz, Hartmut Weber and Mathias Schersing.

Carlowitz represented the sports club SC Karl-Marx-Stadt.

== Achievements ==
Year	Competition	Venue	Position	Event	Notes
Representing East Germany
1981	European Junior Championships	Utrecht, Netherlands	2nd	400 m	47.40
1983	European Junior Championships	Schwechat, Austria	2nd	400 m	45.72
1984	Friendship Games	Moscow, Soviet Union	2nd	4 × 400 m relay	3:00.47
1988	European Indoor Championships	Budapest, Hungary	1st	400 m	45.63
1988	Olympic Games	Seoul, South Korea	4th	4 × 400 m relay	3:01.13
1989	World Cup	Barcelona, Spain	5th	4 × 400 m relay	3:02.72
1990	European Indoor Championships	Glasgow, Scotland	2nd	400 m	46.09
1990	European Championships	Split, Yugoslavia	3rd	400m	45.27
1990	European Championships	Split, Yugoslavia	3rd	4 × 400 m relay	3:01.51
Representing Germany
1991	World Indoor Championships	Seville, Spain	1st	4 × 400 m relay	3:03.05
1991	World Championships	Tokyo, Japan	6th	4 × 400 m relay	3:00.75
