= José Alonso (hurdler) =

Spanish hurdler

José Alonso Valero (born 12 February 1957 in El Vendrell) is a Spanish retired hurdler, who specialized in the 400 metres hurdles. During the indoor season he competed over 400 metres, winning two medals at the 1985 and 1986 European Indoor Championships.

== International competitions ==
Year	Competition	Venue	Position	Event	Notes
Representing Spain
1975	European Junior Championships	Athens, Greece	3rd	400 m hurdles	51.57
1983	World Championships	Helsinki, Finland	10th (sf)	400 m hurdles	49.91
1983	Mediterranean Games	Casablanca, Morocco	1st	400 m hurdles	50.96
1983	Mediterranean Games	Casablanca, Morocco	3rd	4 × 400 m relay	3:06.54
1983	Ibero-American Championships	Barcelona, Spain	2nd	400 m	46.92
1983	Ibero-American Championships	Barcelona, Spain	1st	400 m hurdles	50.08
1983	Ibero-American Championships	Barcelona, Spain	3rd	4 × 400 m relay	3:08.17
1985	European Indoor Championships	Piraeus, Greece	3rd	400 m	46.52
1986	European Indoor Championships	Madrid, Spain	2nd	400 m	47.12
1986	European Championships	Stuttgart, West Germany	6th	400 m hurdles	50.30
1986	Ibero-American Championships	Havana, Cuba	1st	400m hurdles	49.96
1986	Ibero-American Championships	Havana, Cuba	1st	4 × 400 m relay	3:08.54
1987	European Indoor Championships	Liévin, France	10th (sf)	400 m	47.79
1987	World Championships	Rome, Italy	8th	400 m hurdles	49.46
1987	Mediterranean Games	Latakia, Syria	1st	400 m hurdles	49.93
1988	European Indoor Championships	Budapest, Hungary	16th (h)	400 m	47.84
1988	Ibero-American Championships	Mexico City, Mexico	1st	400m hurdles	49.20 A
1988	Ibero-American Championships	Mexico City, Mexico	—	4 × 400 m relay	DNF
1989	World Cup	Barcelona, Spain	5th	400 m hurdles	50.09
1990	European Championships	Split, Yugoslavia	7th	400m hurdles	49.77
1990	Ibero-American Championships	Manaus, Brazil	2nd	4 × 400 m relay	3:10.9
1991	World Indoor Championships	Seville, Spain	7th (h)	4 × 400 m relay	3:10.92
