= Klaus Just =

German sprinter (born 1964)

Medal record

Men's athletics

Representing West Germany

European Championships
Silver medal – second place	1986 Stuttgart	4×400 m
Silver medal – second place	1990 Split	4×400 m

Klaus Just (born 29 March 1964 in Nürtingen, Baden-Württemberg) is a retired West German sprinter.

His personal best time was 45.52 seconds, achieved in August 1985 in Stuttgart.

Just represented the sports club SV Salamander Kornwestheim.

== Achievements ==
Year	Competition	Venue	Position	Event	Notes
Representing West Germany
1983	European Junior Championships	Schwechat, Austria	3rd	400 m	46.44
1985	European Indoor Championships	Piraeus, Greece	2nd	400 m	45.90
1986	European Indoor Championships	Madrid, Spain	7th (h)	400 m	48.02^{1}
1986	European Championships	Stuttgart, West Germany	2nd	4 × 400 m relay	3:00.17
1989	European Indoor Championships	The Hague, Netherlands	3rd	400 m	46.80
1990	European Championships	Split, Yugoslavia	2nd	4 × 400 m relay	3:00.64

^{1}Did not finish in the semifinals
