= Marcel Arnold =

Swiss sprinter

Personal information
- Nationality: Swiss
- Born: 17 January 1962 (age 64)

Sport
- Sport: Sprinting
- Event: 400 metres

Marcel Arnold (born 17 January 1962) is a Swiss sprinter. He competed in the men's 400 metres at the 1984 Summer Olympics.
