= Vito Petrella =

Italian sprinter

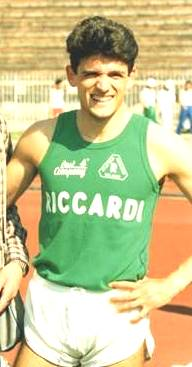

Personal information
- Nationality: Italian
- Born: April 12, 1965 (age 61) Gloucester, Great Britain

Sport
- Country: Italy
- Sport: Athletics
- Event: 400 metres
- Club: Atletica Riccardi

Achievements and titles
- Personal best: 400 m: 46.15 (1988)
Medal record
Mediterranean Games
Gold medal – first place	1987 Latakia	4x400 metres relay
Universiade
Bronze medal – third place	1991 Sheffield	4x400 metres relay
Event	1st	2nd	3rd
World Indoor Championships	0	0	1
Summer Universiade	0	0	1
Mediterranean Games	1	0	1
Total	1	0	3

Vito Petrella (born 12 April 1965) is a former Italian sprinter who specialized in the 400 metres.

== Biography ==
He won four medals at the International athletics competitions, all with the national relays team. He has 20 national team caps, from 1986 to 1992. In 1988, his magic year, Vito Petrella ran 46"37 indoors, he also ran 10"8 in the 100 metres and 21"39 in the 200 metres. His 400 metres personal best time is 46"15 seconds, achieved in August 1988 in Sestriere. However, his best outdoor performance was probably one month before in Turin, at the sea level, when, although running in the first lane, he ran in 46"17 winning the 400 metres at the Italian Championship for Clubs. He was trained by Graziano Della Valle in Pavia together with Tiziano Gemelli (46"31) and Marco Michieli (47"04), who belonged to the same sport club.

== Achievements ==
Year	Competition	Venue	Position	Event	Notes
Representing Italy
1983	Mediterranean Games	Latakia, Syria	1st	4x400 m relay	3:05.29
1986	European Championships	Stuttgart, Germany	4th	4x400 m relay	3:01.37
1988	European Indoor Championships	Budapest, Hungary	5th	400 m	47.73
1989	European Indoor Championships	The Hague, Netherlands	6th	400 m	47.83
1990	European Championships	Split, Yugoslavia	4th	4x400 m relay	3:01.78
1991	World Indoor Championships	Seville, Spain	3rd	4x400 m relay	3:05.51
1991	Summer Universiade	Sheffield, Great Britain	3rd	4x400 m relay	3:07.54
1993	Mediterranean Games	Narbonne, France	3rd	4x400 m relay	3.05.11

== National titles ==
He has won one time the individual national championship.

- 1 win in the 400 metres indoor (1987)

== See also ==
- Italy national relay team
