= Roberto Ribaud =

Italian sprinter

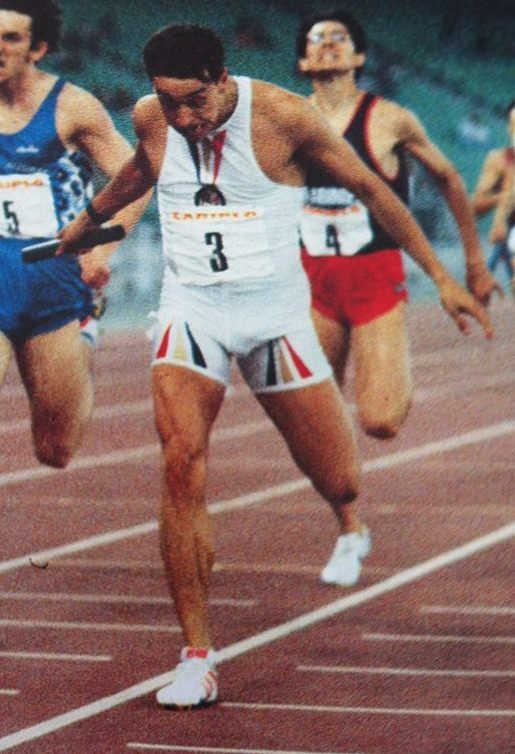

Personal information
- Nickname: Tristan
- Nationality: Italian
- Born: 30 June 1961 (age 65) Taranto, Italy
- Height: 1.78 m (5 ft 10 in)
- Weight: 65 kg (143 lb)

Sport
- Country: Italy
- Sport: Athletics
- Event: 400 metres
- Club: Pro Patria Milan

Achievements and titles
- Personal best: 400 m: 45.69 (1986)
Medal record
Mediterranean Games
Gold medal – first place	1987 Latakia	4 × 400 m relay
Silver medal – second place	1983 Casablanca	4 × 400 m relay
European Cup
Gold medal – first place	1981 Zegreb	4 × 400 m relay

Roberto Ribaud (born 30 June 1961) is a former Italian sprinter who specialized in the 400 meter dash.

== Biography ==
Roberto Ribaud won three medals, at senior level, at the International athletics competitions, and won four edition of the individual national championship. He participated at one editions of the Summer Olympics (1984), he has 43 caps in national team from 1982 to 1990.

He holds the top three Italian best performance of all-time in the 4 × 400 metres relay, established between 1981 and 1986. His personal best time is 45.69 seconds, achieved in the heats of the 1986 European Championships in Stuttgart, is today the 11th best Italian performance of all-time.

== National records ==
- 4 × 400 metres relay: 3:01.42 ( (Socialist Federal Republic of Yugoslavia) Zagreb, 16 August 1981) - with Stefano Malinverni, Alfonso Di Guida, Mauro Zuliani - current holder

== Achievements ==
Year	Competition	Venue	Position	Event	Time	Notes
1982	European Championships	(Greece) Athens	11th (sf)	400 m	46.58	
1982	European Championships	(Greece) Athens	6th	4 × 400 m relay	3:03.21	
1983	World Championships	(Finland) Helsinki	5th	4 × 400 m relay	3:05.10	
1984	Olympic Games	(United States) Los Angeles	5th	4 × 400 m relay	3:01.44	
1986	European Championships	(Germany) Stuttgart	12th (sf)	400 m	46.22	
1986	European Championships	(Germany) Stuttgart	4th	4 × 400 m relay	3:01.37	
1990	European Championships	(Socialist Federal Republic of Yugoslavia) Split	15th (sf)	400 m	47.39	
1990	European Championships	(Socialist Federal Republic of Yugoslavia) Split	4th	4 × 400 m relay	3:01.78	

== National titles ==
He has won 4 times the individual national championship.

- 1 win in the 400 metres (1983)
- 3 wins in the 400 metres indoor (1981, 1982, 1985)

== See also ==
- Italian all-time lists - 400 metres
- Italian all-time lists - 4 × 400 metres relay
- Italy national relay team
