= Mauro Zuliani =

Italian sprinter (born 1959)

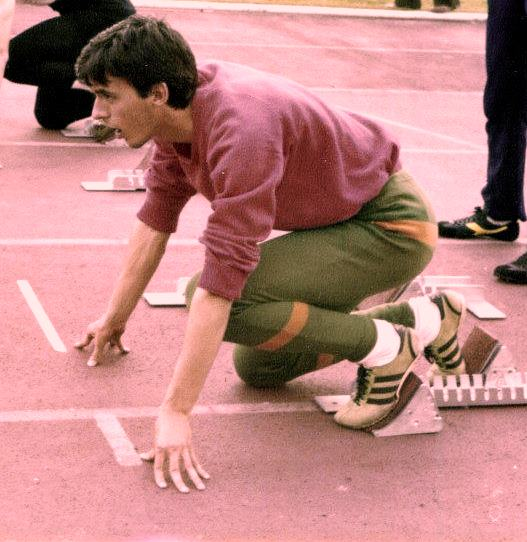

Personal information
- Nationality: Italian
- Born: 23 July 1959 (age 66) Milan, Italy
- Height: 1.75 m (5 ft 9 in)
- Weight: 62 kg (137 lb)

Sport
- Country: Italy
- Sport: Athletics
- Event: 400 metres
- Club: G.S. Fiamme Oro

Achievements and titles
- Personal best: 400 m: 45.26 (1981)
Medal record
Olympic Games
Bronze medal – third place	1980 Moscow	4x400m relay
Mediterranean Games
Silver medal – second place	1983 Casablanca	4x400m relay

Mauro Zuliani (born 23 July 1959) is a former Italian sprinter who specialized in the 400 metres.

== Biography ==
He won four medals at the International athletics competitions, three of these with national relays team. He participated at two editions of the Summer Olympics (1980 and 1984), he has 38 caps in national team from 1978 to 1987.

He won a bronze medal in the 4 x 400 metres relay at the 1980 Summer Olympics, with teammates Stefano Malinverni, Roberto Tozzi and Pietro Mennea. His personal best time is 45.26 seconds, achieved in September 1981 at the World Cup in Rome.

== Achievements ==
Year	Competition	Venue	Position	Event	Time	Notes
1980	Olympic Games	(Soviet Union) Moscow	3rd	4 × 400 m relay	3:03.21	
1981	European Cup	(Socialist Federal Republic of Yugoslavia) Zagreb	1st	4 × 400 m relay	3:01.42	
1981	World Cup	(Italy) Rome	2nd	400 m	45.26	
1982	European Championships	(Greece) Athens	6th	4 × 400 m relay	3:03.21	
1983	Mediterranean Games	(Morocco) Casablanca	2nd	4 × 400 m relay	3:04.54	
1983	World Championships	(Finland) Helsinki	5th	4 × 400 m relay	3:05.10	
1987	European Indoor Championships	(France) Liévin	6th	400 m	47.50	

== National titles ==
He has won 3 times the individual national championship.

- 1 win in the 100 metres (1979)
- 3 wins in the 400 metres (1981, 1982, 1986)

== See also ==
- Italian all-time lists - 400 metres
- Italy national relay team
