= Jörg Vaihinger =

German sprinter (born 1962)

Personal information
- Born: 8 October 1962 (age 63) Dortmund, West Germany
- Height: 1.91 m (6 ft 3 in)
- Weight: 84 kg (185 lb)

Sport
- Sport: Sprint running
- Club: VfL Sindelfingen
Medal record
Representing West Germany
Olympic Games
Bronze medal – third place	1988 Seoul	4 × 400 m relay
World Championships
Silver medal – second place	1983 Helsinki	4 × 400 m relay

Jörg Vaihinger (born 8 October 1962) is a retired West German sprinter. He competed in the 4 × 400 m relay at the 1984, 1988 and 1992 Olympics and won a bronze medal in 1988. He won a silver medal in this event at the 1983 World Championships. After retiring from competitions he worked in his own bank in Stuttgart.
