= Brian Whittle =

Scottish Conservative politician

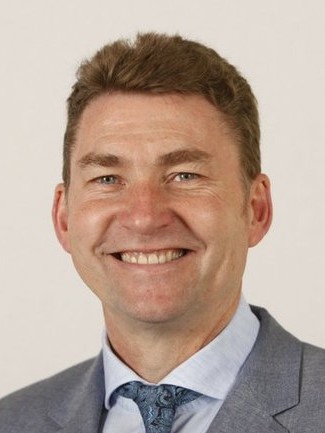
- Official portrait, 2016

Member of the Scottish Parliament for South Scotland (1 of 7 Regional MSPs)
- In office 5 May 2016 – 9 April 2026

Scottish Conservative portfolios
- 2021–present: Shadow Minister for Environment, Biodiversity and Land Reform

Personal details
- Born: Brian Ian Whittle; 26 April 1964 (age 62) Troon, Scotland
- Party: Scottish Conservative
- Sports career
- Sport: Athletics
- Event: 400 m
- Club: Ayr Seaforth; Enfield & Haringey
Medal record
Representing Great Britain
Men's athletics
European Championships
Gold medal – first place	1986 Stuttgart	4 × 400 m relay
Gold medal – first place	1994 Helsinki	4 × 400 m relay
Representing Scotland
Commonwealth Games
Silver medal – second place	1990 Auckland	4 × 400 m relay

Brian Ian Whittle (born 26 April 1964) is a Scottish politician and former athlete, who was a Member of the Scottish Parliament (MSP) for the South Scotland region from 2016 to 2026. A member of the Scottish Conservatives, he served as Shadow Minister for Public Health, Social Care, Mental Wellbeing and Sport.

Whittle won the gold medal in the 4 × 400 metres relay at both the 1986 European Athletics Championships and 1994 European Athletics Championships. He also competed at the 1988 Summer Olympics in Seoul.

== Early life ==
Whittle was born in 1964 growing up in the Scottish town of Troon. His father was a sprinter until his late teens. Whilst at school, Brian tried a wide range of sports, enjoying many of them but it was apparent that he had a natural talent for running. He has maintained that his talent lay in his discipline and ability to train.

Brian Whittle was educated at Marr College in Troon and went on to read chemistry at The University of Glasgow and Kilmarnock College.

== Athletic career ==
At club level, Whittle ran for both Ayr Seaforth and Enfield & Haringey. His best performance in the 400 m was 45.22 at the 1988 Summer Olympics in Seoul. He finished 1st in his heat, 3rd in the quarter-final, but did not progress past the semi-final. He ran 45.5 on the first leg of the 4 × 400 m relay (team – Whittle, Kriss Akabusi, Todd Bennett, Phil Brown), but for once the GB team performed below par and finished fifth in the Olympic final. Perhaps his greatest achievement, and what he is best remembered for, is the manner in which he helped Great Britain win the gold medal in the 4 × 400 metres relay at the 1986 European Championships in Stuttgart. He ran the third leg of the race with one shoe, running a personal best leg time of 45.09. As he took the baton from Kriss Akabusi, Akabusi stood on his shoe and it ripped off, leaving him to run the race without it (thereafter the press nicknamed him 'One-shoe Whittle'). The other members of the team were Roger Black and Derek Redmond, all of whom ran Personal Best times on the day.

Whittle also won a relay gold medal in the 1994 European Athletics Championships 4 × 400 metres relay team alongside David McKenzie, Roger Black, and Du'aine Ladejo. He also ran in the heats of the 4 × 400 m relay at the 1990 European Championships in Split.

He moved to 800 m after the 1988 Olympic Games, and ran in the final of the 1990 Commonwealth Games 800 m in New Zealand, where he finished fourth ahead of Sebastian Coe and Tom McKean. Whittle ran the last leg of the Commonwealth Games 4 × 400 m in 1990, anchoring the Scottish Team to a silver medal. He ran 44.7 seconds for his leg.

He also ran the 800 m in the 1991 World Championships in Tokyo. His personal best for 800 m was 1:45.47 in 1990.

Other notable performances included running 45.98 at the 1988 European Indoor Championships in Budapest winning the silver medal – a feat he repeated in 1989. He ran the last leg of the winning 4 × 400 m relay in the Europa Cup in 1989 (Gateshead), helping Great Britain to win the team title for the first time.

Whittle was an international schools' high jumper, and also competed in the 200 m at the 1986 Commonwealth Games, making the semi-final.

His run of 45.98 seconds for the 400 metres indoors in Hungary in 1988 stood as the Scottish indoor record for 37 years until it was beaten by Brodie Young in February 2025.

== Political career ==
Whittle contested the 2015 UK general election in the constituency of Kilmarnock and Loudoun for the Scottish Conservatives, coming third with 12.5% of the vote.

=== Member of the Scottish Parliament ===
At the 2016 Scottish Parliament election, Whittle ran in the Kilmarnock and Irvine Valley constituency, where he increased the Conservatives' share of the vote to 19.2% (up by 8.8%), finishing third. He was one of two Conservatives to win election on the list for the South Scotland region .

Whittle stood again in Kilmarnock and Irvine Valley at the 2021 Scottish Parliament election, where he took third place with 8,295 votes (20.4%). He was returned on the regional list.

For the 2026 Scottish Parliament election, he stood in East Kilbride and was the 5th candidate of the Scottish Conservatives for South Scotland. He was not elected either as a constituency MP or on the list, thus losing his seat.

== Controversy ==
Whittle sparked a row over the two-child cap on tax credits by claiming “there is no such thing as a rape clause”, claiming it was impossible to debate the controversial welfare reform as “the term rape clause is an invention to beat the Tories with”. The remarks were widely condemned and described as “skin-crawling” by other parties.

== Personal life ==
Whittle has three daughters.
