= Thomas Schönlebe =

German sprinter

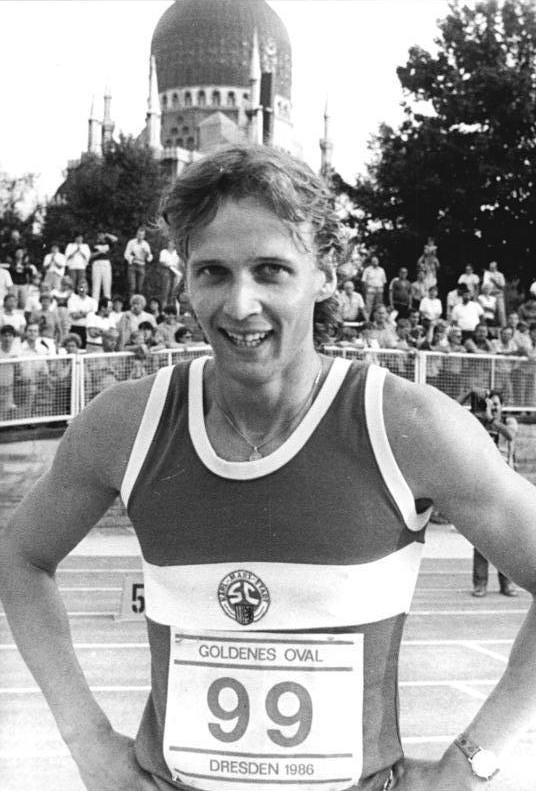
- Schönlebe in 1986

Personal information
- Born: 6 August 1965 (age 60) Frauenstein, East Germany
- Height: 1.85 m (6 ft 1 in)
- Weight: 74 kg (163 lb)
Medal record
Men's athletics
Representing East Germany
World Championships
Gold medal – first place	1987 Rome	400 m
World Indoor Games
Gold medal – first place	1985 Paris	400 m
European Championships
Silver medal – second place	1986 Stuttgart	400 m
Silver medal – second place	1990 Split	400 m
Bronze medal – third place	1990 Split	4×400 m
European Indoor Championships
Gold medal – first place	1986 Madrid	400 m
Representing Germany
World Championships
Bronze medal – third place	1993 Stuttgart	4×400 m
World Indoor Championships
Gold medal – first place	1991 Seville	4×400 m

Thomas Schönlebe (born 6 August 1965) is a retired East German track and field athlete who competed in the 400 metres. He won the gold medal at the 1987 World Championships. In that race, he set a European record of 44.33 seconds which stood for 35 years before it was broken by Matthew Hudson-Smith in August 2023.

A year earlier, Schönlebe had finished second at the 1986 European Championships in Stuttgart behind Roger Black. One of his last achievements was the third place at the 1993 World Championships in Stuttgart with the (now unified) German 4 × 400 m relay team.

Schönlebe achieved three world indoor records during his career

- 45.41 s in the 400 m on 9 February 1986;
- 45.05 s in 400 m on 5 February 1988;
- 3:03.05 in 4 × 400 m relay as a member of a German team on 10 March 1991.

Note: Schönlebe's first record has the distinction of being the inaugural record at the distance when the IAAF established the category of world indoor records on 1 January 1987.

Schönlebe later became chief executive officer of his hometown club, LAC Erdgas Chemnitz

In 1994, he was awarded the Rudolf Harbig Memorial Award.

== International competitions ==
Year	Competition	Venue	Position	Event	Notes
Representing East Germany
1983	European Junior Championships	Schwechat, Austria	1st	400 m	45.64
1983	European Junior Championships	Schwechat, Austria	1st	4 × 400 m	3:04.95
1983	European Cup	London, UK	2nd	400 m	45.70
1985	World Indoor Games	Paris, France	1st	400 m	45.60
1985	European Cup	Moscow, Soviet Union	1st	400 m	44.96
1985	World Cup	Canberra, Australia	2nd	400 m	44.72
1985	World Cup	Canberra, Australia	2nd	4 × 400 m	3:00.82
1986	European Indoor Championships	Madrid, Spain	1st	400 m	46.98
1986	European Championships	Stuttgart, Germany	2nd	400 m	44.63
1986	European Championships	Stuttgart, Germany	6th	4 × 400 m	3:04.87
1987	World Championships	Rome, Italy	1st	400 m	44.33
1987	World Championships	Rome, Italy	heats	4 × 400 m	DNF
1987	European Cup	Prague, Czechoslovakia	1st	400 m	44.96
1987	European Cup	Prague, Czechoslovakia	1st	4 × 400 m	3:00.80
1988	European Indoor Championships	Budapest, Hungary	4th (sf)	400 m	46.86
1988	Olympic Games	Seoul, South Korea	9th (sf)	400 m	44.90
1988	Olympic Games	Seoul, South Korea	4th	4 × 400 m	3:01.13
1989	World Cup	Barcelona, Spain	5th	4 × 400 m	3:02.73
1990	European Championships	Split, Yugoslavia	2nd	400 m	45.13
1990	European Championships	Split, Yugoslavia	3rd	4 × 400 m	3:01.51
Representing Germany
1991	World Indoor Championships	Seville, Spain	1st	4 × 400 m	3:03.05
1992	Olympic Games	Barcelona, Spain	15th (qf)	400 m	45.46
1992	Olympic Games	Barcelona, Spain	heats	4 × 400 m	DNF
1993	World Championships	Stuttgart, Germany	3rd	4 × 400 m	2:59.99
(#) Indicates overall position in quarterfinal (qf) or semifinal (sf) round

Note: Schönlebe qualified for the 1988 European Indoor final but withdrew.

== World rankings ==
Schonlebe was ranked among the best in the world at the 400 m sprint events in the period 1983–87 (including world number one in 1987), according to the votes of the experts of Track and Field News.

400 meters
Year	World rank
1983	8th
1984	-
1985	2nd
1986	10th
1987	1st

== See also ==
- List of European Athletics Championships medalists (men)

Records
Preceded by Erwin Skamrahl	European Record Holder Men's 400 m 21 August 1987 – present	Succeeded by Incumbent
