= Antonio Sánchez (sprinter) =

Spanish sprinter

Personal information
- Born: 22 September 1963 (age 62) Béjar, Spain

Sport
- Sport: Track and field
Medal record
Representing Spain
Mediterranean Games
Gold medal – first place	1987 Latakia	400m
Silver medal – second place	1987 Latakia	4x400m relay
Bronze medal – third place	1983 Casablanca	4x400m relay

Antonio Sánchez Muñoz (born 22 September 1963) is a retired Spanish sprinter who specialized in the 400 metres. He competed in the 400 metres at the 1984 Summer Olympics and the 1988 Summer Olympics.

He won the gold medal at the 1987 Mediterranean Games and finished sixth at the 1986 European Championships in a career best time of 45.41 seconds.

He also competed at the World Championships in 1987 and 1991 and the World Indoor Championships in 1987 and 1989 without reaching the final.
