= Mathias Schersing =

East German sprinter

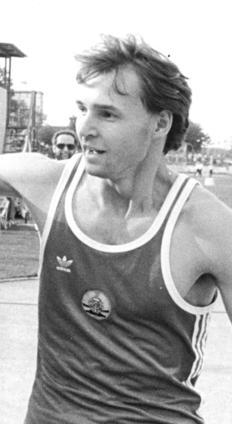
- Mathias Schersing

Medal record

Men's athletics

Representing East Germany

European Championships
| Bronze medal – third place | 1986 Stuttgart | 400 m |

Mathias Schersing (born 7 October 1964 in Halle) is a retired East German sprinter who specialized in the 400 metres.

At the 1986 European Championships he won the bronze medal in the 400 metres in a lifetime best of 44.85 seconds and finished sixth in the 4 × 400 metres relay. He had already won the bronze medal at the European Indoor Championships the same year. At the 1988 Summer Olympics he finished fourth in the relay. In addition he competed in both events at the 1987 World Championships, without reaching the finals.

His personal best time of 44.85 seconds ranks him sixth among German 400 m sprinters, behind Thomas Schönlebe, Erwin Skamrahl, Ingo Schultz, Karl Honz and Hartmut Weber.

Mathias Schersing represented the sports team SC Chemie Halle. He married fellow 400 m sprinter Petra Schersing, née Müller.
