= 1986 World Junior Championships in Athletics – Men's 4 × 400 metres relay =

The men's 4×400 metres relay event at the 1986 World Junior Championships in Athletics was held in Athens, Greece, at Olympic Stadium on 19 and 20 July.

== Medalists ==
Gold	Clifton Campbell; Chip Rish; Percy Waddle; William Reed; United States
Silver	Luis Cadogan; Eulogio Mordoche; Ramiro González; Roberto Hernández; Cuba
Bronze	Anthony Christie; Thomas Mason; Howard Davis; Lyndale Patterson; Jamaica

== Results ==
=== Final ===
20 July

Rank	Nation	Competitors	Time	Notes
1st place, gold medalist(s)	United States	Clifton Campbell; Chip Rish; Percy Waddle; William Reed	3:01.90	
2nd place, silver medalist(s)	Cuba	Luis Cadogan; Eulogio Mordoche; Ramiro González; Roberto Hernández	3:04.22	
3rd place, bronze medalist(s)	Jamaica	Anthony Christie; Thomas Mason; Howard Davis; Lyndale Patterson	3:05.16	
4	United Kingdom	Gary Patterson; Gareth Bakewell; Peter Crampton; Mark Tyler	3:05.89	
5	Soviet Union	Aleksandr Ovchinnikov; Vladimir Lytkin; Andrey Koltovich; Yan Krasnikov	3:06.97	
6	Poland	Tomasz Jędrusik; Marek Szymkowicz; Dariusz Rychter; Krzysztof Sidowski	3:07.39	
7	Nigeria	Joseph Falaye; Vincent Orlando; Hassan Bosso; Yusuf Bakare	3:08.96	
8	France	Christian Landre; Christophe Goris; Pascal Maran; Alain Zamboni	3:09.72	

=== Heats ===
19 July

==== Heat 1 ====
Rank	Nation	Competitors	Time	Notes
1	Cuba	Luis Cadogan; Eulogio Mordoche; Ramiro González; Roberto Hernández	3:07.64	Q
2	Soviet Union	Aleksandr Ovchinnikov; Vladimir Lytkin; Andrey Koltovich; Yan Krasnikov	3:08.64	Q
3	France	Christian Landre; Christophe Goris; Pascal Maran; Alain Zamboni	3:09.03	q
4	Australia	Dolph Francis; Cameron Orr; Miles Murphy; Mark Garner	3:09.65	
5	Canada	Mike Smith; Carl Folkes; Ken LeBlanc; Philip Hughes	3:11.26	
6	Spain	José Luis Arrazola; Jesús Oliván; Pedro Maroto; Manuel Moreno	3:12.20	

==== Heat 2 ====
Rank	Nation	Competitors	Time	Notes
1	Jamaica	Carey Johnson; Howard Davis; Thomas Mason; Lyndale Patterson	3:06.96	Q
2	United Kingdom	Gary Patterson; Gareth Bakewell; Peter Crampton; Mark Tyler	3:09.03	Q
3	Yugoslavia	Milan Petaković; Željko Kerošević; Slobodan Branković; Predrag Melnjak	3:09.83	
4	West Germany	Thomas Kleiber; Bodo Kuhn; Thomas Nettersheim; Volker Höschele	3:09.85	
5	Italy	Nicola Mastroianni; Giulio Bonizzato; Marco Michieli; Daniele Bertogna	3:11.75	
6	Greece	Kharalambos Rethymniotakis; Vasilios Archondidis; Nikólaos Doúbas; Yeóryios Panayiotopoulos	3:12.81	

==== Heat 3 ====
Rank	Nation	Competitors	Time	Notes
1	United States	Clois Carter; Chip Rish; Percy Waddle; Clifton Campbell	3:04.79	Q
2	Nigeria	Joseph Falaye; Vincent Orlando; Hassan Bosso; Yusuf Bakare	3:07.10	Q
3	Poland	Tomasz Jędrusik; Marek Szymkowicz; Dariusz Rychter; Krzysztof Sidowski	3:07.43	q
4	Belgium	Peter Delarue; Roland Moens; Yvan Delrue; Alain Cuypers	3:09.77	
5	New Zealand	Grant Gilbert; Craig Purdy; Jonathon Moyle; Scott Bowden	3:11.88	

== Participation ==
According to an unofficial count, 70 athletes from 17 countries participated in the event.

- Australia (4)
- Belgium (4)
- Canada (4)
- Cuba (4)
- France (4)
- Greece (4)
- Italy (4)
- Jamaica (5)
- New Zealand (4)
- Nigeria (4)
- Poland (4)
- Soviet Union (4)
- Spain (4)
- United Kingdom (4)
- United States (5)
- West Germany (4)
- Yugoslavia (4)
