= Athletics at the 1988 Summer Olympics – Men's 4 × 400 metres relay =

Men's 4 × 400 metres relay at the Games of the XXIV Olympiad
- Venue: Seoul Olympic Stadium
- Date: 30 September 1988 (heats); 1 October 1988 (final)
- Competitors: 99 from 22 nations
- Teams: 99
- Winning time: 2:56.16 WR

Medalists
1st place, gold medalist(s)		Danny Everett; Steve Lewis; Kevin Robinzine; Butch Reynolds; Antonio McKay*; Andrew Valmon*	United States
2nd place, silver medalist(s)		Howard Davis; Devon Morris; Winthrop Graham; Bert Cameron; Trevor Graham*	Jamaica
3rd place, bronze medalist(s)		Norbert Dobeleit; Edgar Itt; Jörg Vaihinger; Ralf Lübke; Bodo Kuhn*; Mark Henrich*	West Germany

These are the official results of the Men's 4 × 400 metre relay event at the 1988 Summer Olympics in Seoul, South Korea. There were a total number of 21 nations competing.

== Summary ==
In the semi-final round, the US team with reserves Antonio McKay and Andrew Valmon won the first semi with a time more than a second and a half faster than all the qualifiers from the second semi who were pressed by a stubborn Yugoslavian team. The second semi was barely won by East Germany in a highly competitive 3:00.60 which they were not able to duplicate the following day in the final.

In the final, US led off by the bronze medalist Danny Everett, started in lane 2. From the gun, Everett was making up the stagger on GDR's Jens Carlowitz immediately to his outside. Also advancing in lane 5 was Sunday Uti for Nigeria, clearly separating from Jamaica's Howard Davis to his inside, Uti having an apparent lead onto the homestretch. As Uit passed on the inside, Kenya's Tito Sawe accelerated past Australia's Robert Ballard, trying to keep up. Uti tied up a little on the straight, US and Nigeria passing about the same time. Everett's split timed at 44.0. America's young gold medalist Steve Lewis took the lead through the turn, as Moses Ugbusien did not maintain Uti's pace. After taking the baton in fourth place, Devon Morris blazed through the turn to position Jamaica in second place at the break. After that exuberance, Morris slowed the second half of the lap, but still maintained second place as the rest of the field closed behind him. But out front, Lewis took a 4 metre lead at the break and extended it to 25, putting the race away early. Lewis' split 43.4.

Mathias Schersing passed Ugbusien and in the last steps, Morris, on the final straightaway, giving East Germany second place at the handoff, but they were almost 3 seconds behind Kevin Robinzine. Running alone, Robinzine extended the lead as Jamaica battled back, Winthrop Graham passing Frank Möller on the home stretch and West Germany's Jörg Vaihinger pulling them into contention. After a 44.8 split, Robinzine passed to the newly crowned World Record holder and silver medalist Butch Reynolds. Almost 4 seconds later, Jamaica's 1983 world champion Bert Cameron was the next pursuer. Through the penultimate turn Ralf Lübke stuck to Cameron's shoulder, West Germany separating from East Germany's reigning world champion Thomas Schönlebe on the backstretch. All eyes were on Reynolds, would the US break the 20 year old world record. Lightbeam timing on the finish line said he missed it by .01, but when the official time was read, it equalled the world record. Jamaica finished more than four seconds later with the silver medal, with West Germany taking bronze.

== Medalists ==
Gold	Silver	Bronze
United States; Danny Everett; Steve Lewis; Butch Reynolds; Kevin Robinzine	Jamaica; Bert Cameron; Howard Davis; Winthrop Graham; Devon Morris	West Germany; Norbert Dobeleit; Edgar Itt; Ralf Lübke; Jörg Vaihinger

== Records ==
These were the standing world and Olympic records (in minutes) prior to the 1988 Summer Olympics.

World record	2:56.16	(United States) Vincent Matthews (United States) Ron Freeman (United States) Larry James (United States) Lee Evans	Mexico City (MEX)	October 20, 1968
Olympic record	2:56.16	(United States) Vincent Matthews (United States) Ron Freeman (United States) Larry James (United States) Lee Evans	Mexico City (MEX)	October 20, 1968

The following Olympic records were set during this competition. The United States equalled the world record in the final.

Date	Athlete	Time	OR	WR
October 1, 1988	(United States) Danny Everett (United States) Steve Lewis (United States) Butch Reynolds (United States) Kevin Robinzine	2:56.16	=OR	=WR

== Final ==
- Held on Saturday October 1, 1988

RANK	NATION	FINAL	TIME
	United States	• Danny Everett • Steve Lewis • Kevin Robinzine • Butch Reynolds	2:56.16 =WR
	Jamaica	• Howard Davis • Devon Morris • Winthrop Graham • Bert Cameron	3:00.30
	West Germany	• Norbert Dobeleit • Edgar Itt • Jörg Vaihinger • Ralf Lübke	3:00.56
4.	East Germany	• Jens Carlowitz • Mathias Schersing • Frank Möller • Thomas Schönlebe	3:01.13
5.	Great Britain	• Brian Whittle • Kriss Akabusi • Todd Bennett • Philip Brown	3:02.00
6.	Australia	• Robert Ballard • Mark Garner • Miles Murphy • Darren Clark	3:02.49
7.	Nigeria	• Sunday Uti • Moses Ugbusien • Henry Amike • Innocent Egbunike	3:02.50
8.	Kenya	• Tito Sawe • Lucas Sang • Paul Ereng • Simeon Kipkemboi	3:04.69

== Semifinals ==
- Held on Friday September 30, 1988

RANK	NATION	HEAT 1	TIME
1.	United States	• Andrew Valmon • Kevin Robinzine • Antonio McKay • Steve Lewis	3:02.84
2.	Kenya	• Tito Sawe • Lucas Sang • Paul Ereng • Simeon Kipkemboi	3:03.24
3.	Great Britain	• Brian Whittle • Kriss Akabusi • Todd Bennett • Philip Brown	3:04.60
4.	Australia	• Miles Murphy • Mark Garner • Robert Ballard • Darren Clark	3:06.63
5.	Barbados	• Seibert Straughn • Richard Louis • Allan Ince • Elvis Forde	3:06.93
6.	Ivory Coast	• Akissi Kpidi • René Djédjémel Mélédjé • Djétenan Kouadio • Gabriel Tiacoh	3:07.15
7.	Portugal	• Paulo Curvelo • Filipe Lomba • Antonio Abrantes • Alvaro Silva	3:07.75
8.	Canada	• John Graham • Carl Folkes • Paul Osland • Anton Skerritt	3:09.48

RANK	NATION	HEAT 2	TIME
1.	East Germany	• Jens Carlowitz • Frank Möller • Mathias Schersing • Thomas Schönlebe	3:00.60
2.	West Germany	• Norbert Dobeleit • Mark Henrich • Jörg Vaihinger • Ralf Lübke	3:00.66
3.	Jamaica	• Trevor Graham • Devon Morris • Bert Cameron • Howard Davis	3:00.94
4.	Nigeria	• Sunday Uti • Moses Ugbusien • Henry Amike • Innocent Egbunike	3:01.13
5.	Yugoslavia	• Branislav Karaulić • Slobodan Popović • Slobodan Branković • Ismail Mačev	3:01.59
6.	Japan	• Hirofumi Koike • Kenji Yamauchi • Hiromi Kawasumi • Susumu Takano	3:03.80
7.	Senegal	• Ousmane Diarra • Babacar Niang • Moussa Fall • Amadou Dia Ba	3:07.19
8.	Pakistan	• Bashir Ahmed • Mohammad Sadaqat • Mohammad Afzal • Muhammad Fayyaz	3:09.50

== Heats ==
- Held on Friday September 30, 1988

RANK	NATION	HEAT 1	TIME
1.	West Germany	• Bodo Kuhn • Mark Henrich • Jörg Vaihinger • Ralf Lübke	3:03.90
2.	Great Britain	• Brian Whittle • Paul Harmsworth • Todd Bennett • Philip Brown	3:04.18
3.	Japan	• Hirofumi Koike • Kenji Yamauchi • Hiromi Kawasumi • Susumu Takano	3:05.93
4.	Australia	• Robert Ballard • Mark Garner • Leigh Miller • Miles Murphy	3:05.93
5.	Barbados	• Seibert Straughn • Richard Louis • Allan Ince • Elvis Forde	3:06.03
6.	Sierra Leone	• Horace Dove-Edwin • Felix Sandy • Benjamin Grant • David Sawyer	3:10.47
7.	Oman	• Sulaiman Al-Habsi • Mohamed Amer Al-Malki • Abdullah Al-Khalidi • Mansour Al-Baloushi	3:12.89
8.	South Korea	• Hwang Hong-cheol • Yun Nam-han • Yu Tae-gyeong • Jo Jin-saeng	3:14.71

RANK	NATION	HEAT 2	TIME
1.	Jamaica	• Howard Burnett • Devon Morris • Trevor Graham • Howard Davis	3:04.00
2.	Yugoslavia	• Branislav Karaulić • Slobodan Popović • Slobodan Branković • Ismail Mačev	3:05.62
3.	Portugal	• Paulo Curvelo • Filipe Lomba • Antonio Abrantes • Álvaro Silva	3:07.75
4.	East Germany	• Jens Carlowitz • Michael Schimmer • Mathias Schersing • Thomas Schönlebe	3:08.13
5.	Canada	• John Graham • Carl Folkes • Paul Osland • Anton Skerritt	3:09.52
6.	Antigua and Barbuda	• Howard Lindsay • Alfred Browne • Oral Selkridge • Larry Miller	3:11.04
7.	Zambia	• Douglas Kalembo • Enock Musonda • Jonathan Chipalo • Samuel Matete	3:11.35

RANK	NATION	HEAT 3	TIME
1.	United States	• Andrew Valmon • Kevin Robinzine • Antonio McKay • Steve Lewis	3:02.16
2.	Kenya	• Tito Sawe • Lucas Sang • Paul Ereng • Simeon Kipkemboi	3:05.21
3.	Nigeria	• Sunday Uti • Moses Ugbusien • Henry Amike • Innocent Egbunike	3:06.59
4.	Senegal	• Ousmane Diarra • Babacar Niang • Moussa Fall • Amadou Dia Ba	3:06.93
5.	Ivory Coast	• Akissi Kpidi • Anatole Zongo Kuyo • Lancine Fofana • Gabriel Tiacoh	3:07.40
6.	Pakistan	• Bashir Ahmad • Muhammad Sadaqat • Muhammad Afzal • Muhammad Fayyaz	3:08.54
7.	Botswana	• Joseph Ramotshabi • Kebapetse Gaseitsiwe • Benny Kgarametso • Sunday Maweni	3:13.16

== See also ==
- 1986 Men's European Championships 4 × 400 m Relay (Stuttgart)
- 1987 Men's World Championships 4 × 400 m Relay (Rome)
- 1990 Men's European Championships 4 × 400 m Relay (Split)
- 1991 Men's World Championships 4 × 400 m Relay (Tokyo)
