= 1986 World Junior Championships in Athletics – Men's 400 metres =

The men's 400 metres event at the 1986 World Junior Championships in Athletics was held in Athens, Greece, at Olympic Stadium on 16 and 18 July.

== Medalists ==
Gold	Miles Murphy; Australia
Silver	Roberto Hernández; Cuba
Bronze	Edgar Itt; West Germany

== Results ==
=== Final ===
18 July

Rank	Name	Nationality	Time	Notes
1st place, gold medalist(s)	Miles Murphy	Australia	45.64	
2nd place, silver medalist(s)	Roberto Hernández	Cuba	45.64	
3rd place, bronze medalist(s)	Edgar Itt	West Germany	45.72	
4	Eulogio Mordoche	Cuba	46.52	
5	Clifton Campbell	United States	46.52	
6	Joseph Falaye	Nigeria	46.81	
7	Peter Crampton	United Kingdom	47.26	
8	Chip Rish	United States	47.50	

=== Semifinals ===
18 July

==== Semifinal 1 ====
Rank	Name	Nationality	Time	Notes
1	Clifton Campbell	United States	45.94	Q
2	Edgar Itt	West Germany	46.41	Q
3	Yusuf Bakare	Nigeria	46.82	
4	Aleksandr Ovchinnikov	Soviet Union	46.86	
5	Roland Moens	Belgium	47.65	
6	Krzysztof Sidowski	Poland	47.92	
7	Keiichi Adachi	Japan	47.94	
8	Seibert Straughn	Barbados	48.29	

==== Semifinal 2 ====
Rank	Name	Nationality	Time	Notes
1	Eulogio Mordoche	Cuba	46.34	Q
2	Joseph Falaye	Nigeria	46.51	Q
3	Mark Tyler	United Kingdom	46.95	
4	Joseph Sainah	Kenya	46.96	
5	Tibor Martina	Hungary	47.11	
6	Yvan Delrue	Belgium	47.32	
7	Slobodan Branković	Yugoslavia	47.44	
8	António Abrantes	Portugal	48.33	

==== Semifinal 3 ====
Rank	Name	Nationality	Time	Notes
1	Roberto Hernández	Cuba	45.53	Q
2	Miles Murphy	Australia	46.02	Q
3	Chip Rish	United States	46.33	q
4	Peter Crampton	United Kingdom	46.78	q
5	Tamás Molnár	Hungary	46.96	
6	Vladimir Lytkin	Soviet Union	47.44	
7	Dawda Jallow	Gambia	48.01	
8	Carl Folkes	Canada	48.27	

=== Heats ===
16 July

==== Heat 1 ====
Rank	Name	Nationality	Time	Notes
1	Joseph Falaye	Nigeria	46.63	Q
2	Aleksandr Ovchinnikov	Soviet Union	46.99	Q
3	Dawda Jallow	Gambia	47.16	Q
4	Tamás Molnár	Hungary	47.17	q
5	Željko Kerošević	Yugoslavia	48.83	
6	Hossain Milzer	Bangladesh	48.96	
7	Ali Yacoub Ismail Ishaq	Kuwait	49.52	
8	Awad Ead Awad	Egypt	50.42	

==== Heat 2 ====
Rank	Name	Nationality	Time	Notes
1	Clifton Campbell	United States	46.60	Q
2	Roland Moens	Belgium	47.33	Q
3	Seibert Straughn	Barbados	47.70	Q
4	Manuel Moreno	Spain	48.29	
5	Tshokolo Peloethata	Botswana	48.66	
6	James Dunda	Canada	48.78	
7	Washington Rodrigues	Brazil	49.79	
8	Horace Dove-Edwin	Sierra Leone	52.12	

==== Heat 3 ====
Rank	Name	Nationality	Time	Notes
1	Edgar Itt	West Germany	47.02	Q
2	Tibor Martina	Hungary	47.49	Q
3	Vladimir Lytkin	Soviet Union	47.83	Q
4	Nicola Mastroianni	Italy	48.28	
5	Yeóryios Panayiotopoulos	Greece	48.82	
6	Sultan Abdulrahman	Saudi Arabia	48.97	
7	Omar Ibrahim	Egypt	51.14	

==== Heat 4 ====
Rank	Name	Nationality	Time	Notes
1	Miles Murphy	Australia	46.83	Q
2	Joseph Sainah	Kenya	47.17	Q
3	Slobodan Branković	Yugoslavia	47.28	Q
4	António Abrantes	Portugal	47.91	q
5	Dariusz Rychter	Poland	48.30	
6	Moses Phiri	Zambia	50.39	
7	Paul Prea	Seychelles	50.69	

==== Heat 5 ====
Rank	Name	Nationality	Time	Notes
1	Chip Rish	United States	47.34	Q
2	Yvan Delrue	Belgium	47.75	Q
3	Mark Tyler	United Kingdom	47.80	Q
4	Keiichi Adachi	Japan	48.18	q
5	Nicos Adamou	Cyprus	48.93	
6	Khayar Seck	Senegal	49.12	
7	M.Adam Salih	Sudan	50.81	

==== Heat 6 ====
Rank	Name	Nationality	Time	Notes
1	Roberto Hernández	Cuba	46.75	Q
2	Carl Folkes	Canada	47.58	Q
3	Peter Crampton	United Kingdom	48.17	Q
4	Craig Purdy	New Zealand	48.81	
5	Legesse Dereba	Ethiopia	48.99	
6	Yuji Yoshioka	Japan	49.39	
7	Marco Tamagnini	San Marino	52.33	
8	Salem Matar	United Arab Emirates	53.23	

==== Heat 7 ====
Rank	Name	Nationality	Time	Notes
1	Eulogio Mordoche	Cuba	46.91	Q
2	Yusuf Bakare	Nigeria	47.45	Q
3	Krzysztof Sidowski	Poland	47.79	Q
4	Scott Bowden	New Zealand	48.46	
5	Christopher Mbilo	Tanzania	48.76	
6	Nikólaos Doúbas	Greece	49.25	
7	Pedro Maroto	Spain	50.56	
8	Oum Sidet	Cambodia	53.17	

== Participation ==
According to an unofficial count, 53 athletes from 38 countries participated in the event.

- Australia (1)
- Bangladesh (1)
- Barbados (1)
- Belgium (2)
- Botswana (1)
- Brazil (1)
- Cambodia (1)
- Canada (2)
- Cuba (2)
- Cyprus (1)
- Egypt (2)
- Ethiopia (1)
- Gambia (1)
- Greece (2)
- Hungary (2)
- Italy (1)
- Japan (2)
- Kenya (1)
- Kuwait (1)
- New Zealand (2)
- Nigeria (2)
- Poland (2)
- Portugal (1)
- San Marino (1)
- Saudi Arabia (1)
- Senegal (1)
- Seychelles (1)
- Sierra Leone (1)
- Soviet Union (2)
- Spain (2)
- Sudan (1)
- Tanzania (1)
- United Arab Emirates (1)
- United Kingdom (2)
- United States (2)
- West Germany (1)
- Yugoslavia (2)
- Zambia (1)
