= Tamás Molnár (disambiguation) =

Tamás Molnár, or Thomas Molnar may refer to:

- Tamás Molnár (born 1975), a Hungarian water polo player
- Tamás Molnár (powerlifter) (born 1975), a powerlifter and world champion
- Tamás Molnár (sprinter) (born 1968), a Hungarian former sprinter

== See also ==
- Tamás (name), Tamás is a Hungarian, masculine given name. It is a Hungarian equivalent of the name Thomas
- Thomas Molnar (1921-2010), Thomas Steven Molnar, a Catholic philosopher, historian and political theorist.
