= Tomasz Jędrusik =

Polish sprinter

Tomasz Jędrusik (born February 3, 1969, in Szczecin, Zachodniopomorskie) is a male former track and field sprinter from Poland, who represented his native country at two Summer Olympics: 1988 and 1996. He set his personal best (45.27) in the men's 400 metres event in 1988.

== Competition record ==
Year	Competition	Venue	Position	Event	Notes
Representing Poland
1985	European Junior Championships	Cottbus, East Germany	5th	4 × 400 m relay	3:11.45
1986	World Junior Championships	Athens, Greece	3rd	4 × 100 m relay	39.98
1986	World Junior Championships	Athens, Greece	6th	4 × 400 m relay	3:07.39
1987	European Junior Championships	Birmingham, United Kingdom	2nd	400 m	46.31
1987	European Junior Championships	Birmingham, United Kingdom	2nd	4 × 400 m relay	3:08.72
1988	World Junior Championships	Sudbury, Canada	1st	400m	46.19
1988	World Junior Championships	Sudbury, Canada	—	4 × 400 m relay	DQ
1988	Olympic Games	Seoul, South Korea	16th (sf)	400 m	46.17
1989	European Indoor Championships	The Hague, Netherlands	7th (sf)	200 m	21.27
1989	World Indoor Championships	Budapest, Hungary	15th (h)	400 m	47.36
1990	European Championships	Split, Yugoslavia	8th	400 m	46.25
1990	European Championships	Split, Yugoslavia	9th (h)	4 × 400 m relay	3:06.51
1995	World Championships	Gothenburg, Sweden	5th	4 × 400 m relay	3:03.84
1996	Olympic Games	Atlanta, United States	6th	4 × 400 m relay	3:00.96
