= Kawasumi =

Kawasumi (written: 川澄) is a Japanese surname. Notable people with the surname include:

- Ayako Kawasumi (川澄 綾子; born 1976), Japanese voice actress and singer
- Hiromi Kawasumi (川角 博美; born 1962), Japanese sprinter
- Nahomi Kawasumi (川澄 奈穂美; born 1985), Japanese footballer
