= Paul Sanders (athlete) =

British sprinter (born 1962)

Personal information
- Born: 11 January 1962 (age 64)

Sport
- Country: United Kingdom
- Sport: Athletics
- Event: 400 metres
- Coached by: Mike Smith

Achievements and titles
- Personal best: 400 m: 45.33 seconds
Medal record
Men's athletics
Representing Great Britain
European Championships
Gold medal – first place	1990 Split	4×400 m

Paul Sanders (born 11 January 1962) is a British former track and field sprinter who specialised in the 400 metres. He was a gold medallist at the 1990 European Athletics Championships, running in the British men's 4 × 400 metres relay quartet alongside Kriss Akabusi, John Regis, and Roger Black. Their winning time of 2:58.22 minutes was a European record at the time and remains the European Championship record.

Sanders competed twice for Great Britain individually, reaching the semi-finals at the 1990 European Athletics Championships and the quarter-finals at the 1991 World Championships in Athletics. He ranked third in Europe on time in the 1991 season, with his lifetime best of 45.33 seconds for the distance.

He did not win any title at the AAA Championships during his career but did win two titles at the UK Athletics Championships, first in 1989 then again in 1991. He was also runner-up in 1988 (to Brian Whittle) and 1990 (to Roger Black). At sub-national level, he was the 1986 winner of the 400 m at the Inter-Counties Championships.

Sanders was coached by Mike Smith, who was also coach to British sprinters Akabusi, Black and Iwan Thomas.

== International competitions ==
Year	Competition	Venue	Position	Event	Notes
1990	European Championships	Split, SFR Yugoslavia	5th (semis)	400 m	46.06
1990	European Championships	Split, SFR Yugoslavia	1st	4 × 400 m relay	2:58.22 AR
1991	European Cup	Frankfurt, Germany	1st	4 × 400 m relay	3:00.58
1991	World Championships	Tokyo, Japan	7th (qf)	400 m	46.59

== National titles ==
- UK Athletics Championships
  - 400 m: 1989, 1991

== See also ==
- List of European Athletics Championships medalists (men)
- List of British champions in 400 metres
