= Robert Ballard (disambiguation) =

Robert Ballard (born 1942) is a former United States Navy officer and oceanographer.

Robert Ballard may also refer to:

- Robert Ballard II (c. 1572 or 1575–after 1650), French lutenist and composer
- Robert Ballard (athlete) (born 1964), Australian athlete

== See also ==
- Robert Ballard Long (1771–1825), officer of the British and Hanoverian armies
