= 1991 World Championships in Athletics – Men's 400 metres =

Men's 400 metres at the 1991 World Championships
- Venue: Olympic Stadium
- Dates: 25 August (heats); 26 August (quarter-finals); 27 August (semi-finals); 29 August (final)
- Competitors: 46
- Winning time: 44.57

Medalists
gold medal	Antonio Pettigrew	United States
silver medal	Roger Black	Great Britain
bronze medal	Danny Everett	United States

These are the official results of the Men's 400 metres event at the 1991 IAAF World Championships in Tokyo, Japan. There were a total of 46 participating athletes, with six qualifying heats and the final held on Thursday August 29, 1991. The winning margin was 0.05 seconds.

== Medalists ==
Gold	Antonio Pettigrew; United States (USA)
Silver	(United Kingdom) Roger Black; Great Britain (GBR)
Bronze	Danny Everett; United States (USA)

== Schedule ==
- All times are Japan Standard Time (UTC+9)

Heats
25.08.1991 – 10:00h
Quarterfinals
26.08.1991 – 17:20h
Semifinals
27.08.1991 – 18:40h
Final
29.08.1991 – 20:40h

== Final ==
RANK	FINAL	TIME
	Antonio Pettigrew (USA)	44.57
	Roger Black (GBR)	44.62
	Danny Everett (USA)	44.63
4.	Roberto Hernández (CUB)	44.86
5.	Andrew Valmon (USA)	45.09
6.	Ian Morris (TRI)	45.12
7.	Susumu Takano (JPN)	45.39
8.	Mark Garner (AUS)	45.47

== Semifinals ==
- Held on Tuesday 1991-08-27

RANK	HEAT 1	TIME
1.	Antonio Pettigrew (USA)	44.52
2.	Roberto Hernandez (CUB)	44.66
3.	Danny Everett (USA)	44.97
4.	Ian Morris (TRI)	45.00
5.	Seymour Fagan (JAM)	45.34
6.	Ibrahim Ismail Muftah (QAT)	45.64
7.	Derek Redmond (GBR)	45.67
8.	Benyounes Lahlou (MAR)	45.75

RANK	HEAT 1	TIME
1.	Roger Black (GBR)	44.64
2.	Andrew Valmon (USA)	45.08
3.	Susumu Takano (JPN)	45.43
4.	Mark Garner (AUS)	45.53
5.	Patrick O'Connor (JAM)	45.54
6.	Samson Kitur (KEN)	46.07
7.	Alvin Daniel (TRI)	46.23
8.	Olivier Noirot (FRA)	47.13

== Quarterfinals ==
- Held on Monday 1991-08-26

RANK	HEAT 1	TIME
1.	Roberto Hernández (CUB)	44.71
2.	Susumu Takano (JPN)	44.91
3.	Ian Morris (TRI)	45.07
4.	Ibrahim Ismail Muftah (QAT)	45.37
5.	Jens Carlowitz (GER)	45.68
6.	Dawda Jallow (GAM)	46.21
7.	Simon Kipkemboi (KEN)	46.29
8.	Michael Joubert (AUS)	46.94

RANK	HEAT 2	TIME
1.	Andrew Valmon (USA)	45.41
2.	Seymour Fagan (JAM)	45.45
3.	Samson Kitur (KEN)	45.54
4.	Derek Redmond (GBR)	45.66
5.	Paul Greene (AUS)	45.97
6.	Lázaro Martínez (CUB)	46.12
7.	Tamas Molnar (HUN)	46.47
–	Carlos Morales (CHI)	DNS

RANK	HEAT 3	TIME
1.	Antonio Pettigrew (USA)	45.03
2.	Mark Garner (AUS)	45.08
3.	Roger Black (GBR)	45.39
4.	Patrick O'Connor (JAM)	45.56
5.	Patrick Delice (TRI)	45.78
6.	Anthony Wilson (CAN)	47.03
7.	Amar Hacini (ALG)	47.30
–	Cayetano Cornet (ESP)	DNS

RANK	HEAT 4	TIME
1.	Alvin Daniel (TRI)	45.48
2.	Benyounes Lahlou (MAR)	45.69
3.	Danny Everett (USA)	45.93
4.	Olivier Noirot (FRA)	45.98
5.	Dmitriy Kliger (URS)	46.29
6.	Wilson Cañizales (COL)	46.42
7.	Paul Sanders (GBR)	46.59
–	Andrea Nuti (ITA)	DQ

== Qualifying heats ==
- Held on Sunday 1991-08-25

RANK	HEAT 1	TIME
1.	Antonio Pettigrew (USA)	45.02
2.	Wilson Cañizales (COL)	46.23
3.	Patrick O'Connor (JAM)	46.30
4.	Paul Sanders (GBR)	46.38
5.	Simon Kipkemboi (KEN)	46.46
6.	Michael Joubert (AUS)	46.55
7.	Carlos Morales (CHI)	46.80
8.	Manuel Alves Fonseca (STP)	54.01

RANK	HEAT 2	TIME
1.	Susumu Takano (JPN)	46.10
2.	Samson Kitur (KEN)	46.19
3.	Lázaro Martínez (CUB)	46.25
4.	Tamas Molnar (HUN)	46.64
5.	Dmitriy Kliger (URS)	46.71
6.	Roberto Bortolotto (BRA)	47.44
7.	Joel Otim (UGA)	48.03
–	Amadou Sy Savane (GUI)	DQ

RANK	HEAT 3	TIME
1.	Alvin Daniel (TRI)	45.64
2.	Derek Redmond (GBR)	45.78
3.	Benyounes Lahlou (MAR)	45.80
4.	Andrew Valmon (USA)	46.16
5.	Andrea Nuti (ITA)	46.80
6.	Filipe Lomba (POR)	47.37
7.	Eswort Coombs (VIN)	48.63
–	Tim Hesse (GHA)	DQ

RANK	HEAT 4	TIME
1.	Danny Everett (USA)	45.73
2.	Patrick Delice (TRI)	46.03
3.	Paul Greene (AUS)	46.27
4.	Olivier Noirot (FRA)	46.41
5.	Dawda Jallow (GAM)	46.66
6.	Anthony Wilson (CAN)	46.71
7.	Seibert Straughn (BAR)	46.88

RANK	HEAT 5	TIME
1.	Seymour Fagan (JAM)	44.88
2.	Jens Carlowitz (GER)	45.78
3.	Roger Black (GBR)	46.02
4.	Ian Morris (TRI)	46.16
5.	Amar Hacini (ALG)	46.52
6.	Tsvetoslav Stankulov (BUL)	46.89
7.	Thabani Gonye (ZIM)	47.61
8.	Henry Sweeney (MSR)	49.81

RANK	HEAT 6	TIME
1.	Roberto Hernández (CUB)	45.49
2.	Mark Garner (AUS)	45.77
3.	Ibrahim Ismail Muftah (QAT)	46.20
4.	Cayetano Cornet (ESP)	46.54
5.	Jindrich Roun (TCH)	46.86
6.	Charles Gitonga (KEN)	47.03
–	Troy Douglas (BER)	DNS

== See also ==
- 1990 Men's European Championships 400 metres (Split)
- 1992 Men's Olympic 400 metres (Barcelona)
- 1993 Men's World Championships 400 metres (Stuttgart)
