= Robert Ballard (athlete) =

Australian track and field athlete

Personal information
- Full name: Robert John Ballard
- Nationality: Australian
- Born: 25 September 1964 (age 61)
- Height: 187 cm (6 ft 2 in)
- Weight: 77 kg (170 lb)

Sport
- Country: Australia
- Sport: track and field
- Event(s): 400 metres, 4 × 400 metres relay

Robert John Ballard (born 25 September 1964) is a former Australian track and field athlete. He represented Australia at both the Olympic Games and the Commonwealth Games.

At the 1988 Summer Olympics in Seoul, South Korea, he teamed up with Mark Garner, Miles Murphy and Darren Clark to make the final of the 4 × 400 metres relay where they finished sixth.

At the 1990 Commonwealth Games in Auckland, New Zealand, he teamed up with Leigh Miller, Mark Garner and Robert Stone where they were disqualified in the second heat in the 4 × 400 metres relay.

On 23 August 2000, Ballard was awarded the Australian Sports Medal for his athletic achievements.

Ballard won the 120 metres Wangaratta Gift at the Wangaratta Showgrounds in 1989 and 2006.
