= Clifton Campbell =

American sprinter (born 1967)

Personal information
- Born: 18 June 1967 (age 59)
- Education: Seminole High School (Seminole County, Florida); Auburn University

Sport
- Country: United States
- Sport: Sport of athletics
- Event: 400 metres
- College team: Auburn Tigers
- Coached by: Ken Brauman

Achievements and titles
- National finals: 1986 NCAAs; • 400m, 8th; 1986 USA U20s; • 400m, 1st (gold); 1988 NCAA Indoors; • 400m, 1st (gold); 1988 NCAAs; • 400m, 8th
- Personal bests: 200m: 20.73 (+1.7) (1989); 400m: 45.32 (1988); 500m: 1:02.10 sh (1987)
Medal record
Men's athletics
Representing the United States
World Indoor Championships
| Silver medal – second place | 1991 Seville | 4 × 400 m relay |
World U20 Championships
| Gold medal – first place | 1986 Athens | 4 × 400 m relay |
Pan American U20 Championships
| Silver medal – second place | 1986 Winter Park | 400 m |
| Silver medal – second place | 1986 Winter Park | 4 × 400 m relay |
- Updated on November 2024

Clifton Campbell (born 18 June 1967) is an American former sprinter specializing in the 400 metres and an inaugural World Athletics Indoor Championships silver medallist in the relay. After winning the 1986 World U20 4 × 400 m title and the 1988 NCAA Division I Indoor Track and Field Championships title in the 400 m for the Auburn Tigers, Campbell won the silver medal at the 1991 World Indoor Championships 4 × 400 m by virtue of running in the heat.

== Career ==
Campbell began running track during his sophomore year at Seminole High School, where he was also a starting tailback in football. As a prep, he beat many of Walter McCoy's conference and district records in the 400 m.

In his freshman year competing for the Auburn Tigers track and field team, Campbell placed 8th at the 1986 NCAA Division I Outdoor Track and Field Championships and won the 1986 USA U20 Outdoor Track and Field Championships title in the 400 m. His U20 performance qualified him for the U.S. teams at the 1986 Pan American Junior Athletics Championships and 1986 World Junior Championships in Athletics later that season.

At the Pan American U20 Championships, Campbell won silver medals in the 400 m (behind Roberto Hernández) and in the 4 × 400 m relay by running the anchor leg. Running the same two events the World U20 Championships in Athens, Campbell won his 400 m heat and semifinal and finished 5th in the final. In the relay, Campbell led off the U.S. winning team, running a time of 3:01.90.

Clifton won his only NCAA national title at the 1988 NCAA Division I Indoor Track and Field Championships, running 46.40 to win the indoor 400 m. He again placed 8th at the 1988 NCAA Division I Outdoor Track and Field Championships later that year.

In February 1991, Clifton placed 3rd in the 2nd section of the 400 m at the United States World Indoor Sprint Trials held at Harvard University, qualifying him for the relay team at the 1991 World Indoor Championships in Athletics. In the World Indoor 4 × 400 m, Campbell led off the U.S. team to a heat win. In the finals, both Clifton and Willie Smith were replaced by Raymond Pierre and Charles Jenkins Jr., and the Americans won the silver medal.

== Personal life ==
Campbell was born on 18 June 1967. He is from Sanford, Florida where he attended Seminole High School. At Seminole, Campbell didn't employ a strategy, saying, "I just go all out from the gun". He committed to Auburn University via a grant-in-aid scholarship.

== Statistics ==
=== Personal best progression ===
400m progression
| # | Mark | Pl. | Competition | Venue | Date | Ref. |
|---|---|---|---|---|---|---|
| 1 | 45.43 | 1st place, gold medalist(s) | | Knoxville, TN | 17 May 1986 | |
| 2 | 45.32 | (bronze) (Heat 2) | 1988 NCAA Division I Outdoor Track and Field Championships | Eugene, OR | 1 Jun 1988 | |
