= Roger Black =

British sprinter (born 1966)

Roger Black MBE
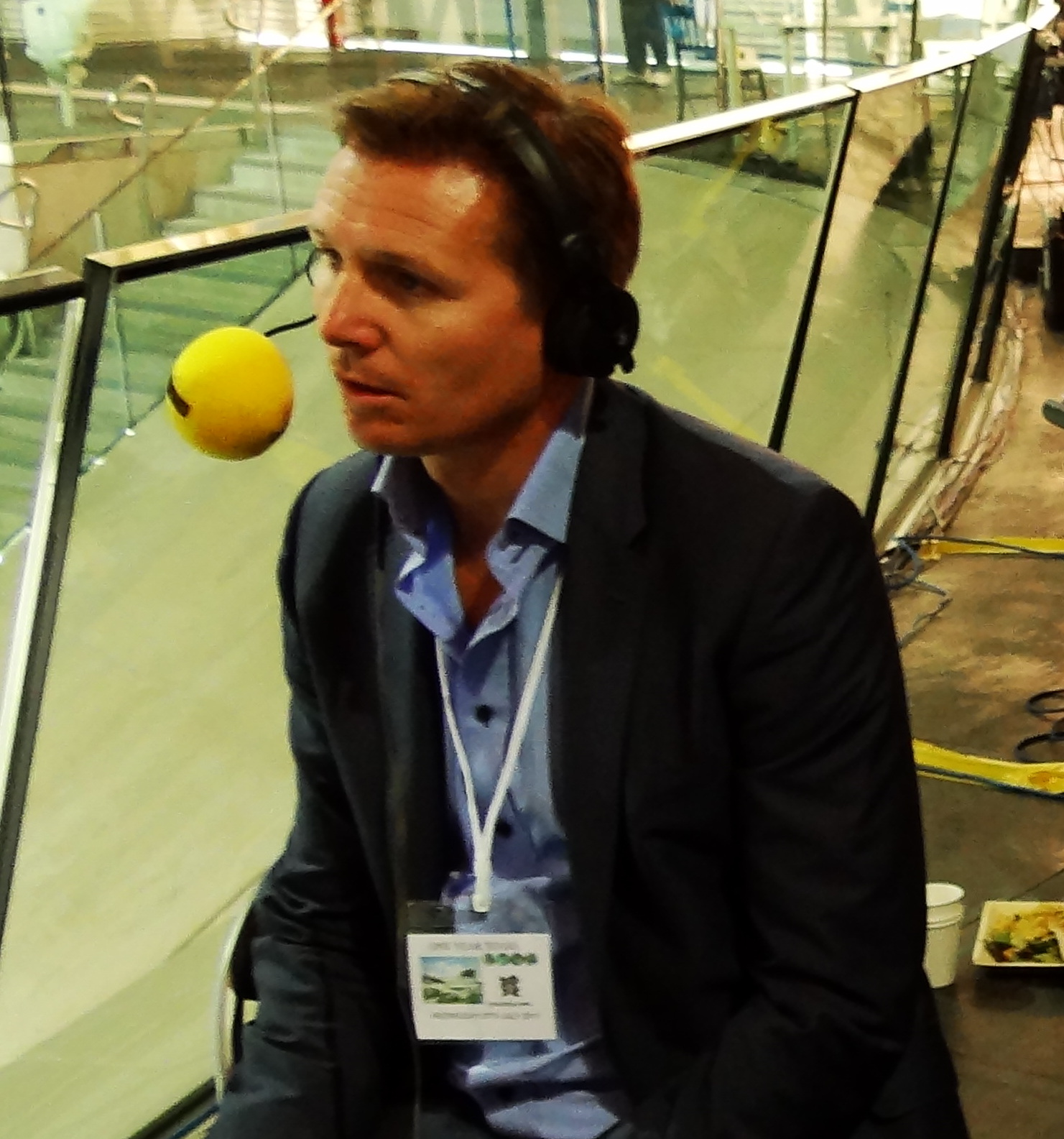
- Black in 2011

Personal information
- Nationality: British (English)
- Born: 31 March 1966 (age 60) Gosport, Hampshire, England

Sport
- Sport: Athletics
- Event: 400 m
- Club: Southampton & Eastleigh A.A.C./Team Solent
Medal record
Men's athletics
Representing Great Britain
Olympic Games
Silver medal – second place	1996 Atlanta	400 m
Silver medal – second place	1996 Atlanta	4 × 400 m relay
Bronze medal – third place	1992 Barcelona	4 × 400 m relay
World Championships
Gold medal – first place	1991 Tokyo	4 × 400 m relay
Gold medal – first place	1997 Athens	4 × 400 m relay
Silver medal – second place	1987 Rome	4 × 400 m relay
Silver medal – second place	1991 Tokyo	400 m
European Championships
Gold medal – first place	1986 Stuttgart	400 m
Gold medal – first place	1986 Stuttgart	4 × 400 m relay
Gold medal – first place	1990 Split	400 m
Gold medal – first place	1990 Split	4 × 400 m relay
Gold medal – first place	1994 Helsinki	4 × 400 m relay
Silver medal – second place	1994 Helsinki	400 m
Representing England
Commonwealth Games
Gold medal – first place	1986 Edinburgh	400 m
Gold medal – first place	1986 Edinburgh	4 × 400 m relay

Roger Anthony Black MBE (born 31 March 1966) is an English former athlete who competed internationally for Great Britain and England. During his athletics career, he won individual silver medals in the 400 metres sprint at both the Olympic Games and World Championships, two individual gold medals at the European Championships, and 4 × 400 metres relay gold medals at both the World and European Championships.

Since retiring from athletics, he has worked as a television presenter and motivational speaker. In 2008, Black joined forces with fellow athlete Steve Backley and founded BackleyBlack LLP. Black has a collection of fifteen medals from major senior athletics competitions to add to his two European junior championship gold medals.

Black won five national outdoor championships at 400 metres, and one at 200 metres. As of July 2022, Black remains ranked joint third in the all-time Great Britain lists for the 400 metres.

== Early life ==
He was born in Gosport, Hampshire, to David (a doctor) and Thelma, with a twin sister Julia. He attended Alverstoke Church of England Primary School and Portsmouth Grammar School, becoming Head Boy in 1983/84. It was whilst playing football with a local team (RPFC) that he began demonstrating his prowess as a runner, scoring numerous goals as a flying forward leaving many defenders in his wake. He then joined athletics clubs, re-took one of his A-level exams and began studying medicine at the University of Southampton, but he left his course after three months as he had begun to achieve success as an athlete.

== Athletics career ==
Black rose to prominence after winning the 400 metres event at the 1985 European Athletics Junior Championships in a time of 45.43 at the age of 19. In 1986, Black graduated to the senior ranks and made a spectacular impact first winning for England at the 1986 Commonwealth Games in Edinburgh in 45.57, and then at the European Championships in Stuttgart, winning in a time of 44.59, his first British Record, breaking Derek Redmond's 44.82 record from the previous year. Having also won golds in both 4 × 400 m relays at both of those events as well, Black's 1986 season had turned into a gold rush of four gold medals.

His next three seasons were wiped out through illness and injuries and he only just made the relay team for the 1987 World Championships in Rome, where the GB team won the silver medal. He returned to the track in 1990 and his good form took him to the European Championships again, which were held in Split. Black contested the 400 m final and retained his title with a time of 45.11, holding off his old rival Thomas Schönlebe. He then anchored the GB team to an easy 4 × 400 m victory winning by a margin of 15 metres, and a European record of 2:58.23, with his split time of 43.9. He thus achieved a rare double-double – two gold medals at consecutive championships.

Black's outstanding 1990 season was followed by the 1991 World Championship season holding much expectation. His early season form at Crystal Palace saw him beat Olympic Champion Steve Lewis and Antonio Pettigrew but only to lose to Michael Johnson. Johnson would not contest the 400 m at the World Championships meaning the 400 m would be a contest between Black, Pettigrew and Danny Everett as the main contenders.

Black finished second in the individual 400 m in Tokyo to Antonio Pettigrew. Black put in his effort on the third 100 m and entered the home straight two metres up on Pettigrew. He then tired and was caught on the line. Pettigrew's time was 44.57 and Black finished in 44.62. Pettigrew later admitted the use of performance-enhancing drugs from 1997 onwards in June 2008. No clear evidence has emerged, and Pettigrew never admitted anything further, before his 2010 suicide, of him using performance-enhancing drugs during the 1991 season.

In the final event of the Tokyo Championships, the men's 4 × 400 relay was billed as a two-way contest between the Great Britain team and the United States team. In an unusual change of tactics, the GB team members decided to put Black on the opening leg, followed by Redmond, then John Regis and, on anchor, the 400 m hurdler Kriss Akabusi. Black later explained the tactics were to put him as first runner to give the team a lead or at least keep the team in close contention. Black's leg was 44.6 from a block start. Redmond's leg was 44.1, though he conceded the lead to Quincy Watts. Regis followed Everett round the third lap, clocking 44.3. While Everett handed to Pettigrew with a two-metre lead, Regis handed to Akabusi. Akabusi sat in behind the World Champion Pettigrew for the first 200 m of the final lap, closed around the crown of the final bend and then the much improved Akabusi kicked past Pettigrew in the final 80 m to pull off a spectacular victory, winning in a time of 2:57.53 – a British and European record time.

Black set a new British Record of 44.37 seconds on 3 July 1996 in Lausanne, Switzerland. This was subsequently broken a year later by Iwan Thomas who shaved 0.01s from Black's time. Fellow GB athlete Mark Richardson also equalled Black's mark in 1998. As of July 2022, Black's time still stands as the third fastest of all time recorded by a British runner.

His greatest individual achievement in track and field was in the 1996 Olympics in Atlanta when in the final of the 400 m he finished in second place behind Michael Johnson, winning the silver medal in the process. However, partly due to injuries, he never rediscovered this form, and subsequently retired from the sport only two years later in 1998 after he was not selected for the 1998 European Championships.

Black was coached by Mike Smith and Mike Whittingham, and was sponsored by Reebok.

== 1997 World Championships ==
The World Championships' 4 × 400 m originally saw the USA beat Great Britain by 0.18 seconds in a thrilling finale. Subsequently, US athlete, Antonio Pettigrew admitted to using performance-enhancing substances during this period. On 7 January 2010, it was announced that Great Britain's 1997 World Championship 4 × 400 m relay team are to be awarded the gold medal due to the disqualification of the USA team.

Black, running second leg, tied up and lost ground to his old rival Pettigrew but Jamie Baulch and Mark Richardson held second place round the last two laps. Great Britain's time of 2:56.65 was just outside the time they achieved in Atlanta the previous year.

== Awards ==
Black was appointed Member of the Order of the British Empire (MBE) in the 1992 New Year Honours for services to athletics. In 1995 Southampton University gave Black an honorary degree.

== Television career ==
In 1998, Black appeared on the children's news programme Newsround with fellow athlete Iwan Thomas reporting on childhood obesity.

Black has worked regularly for the BBC on programmes such as Tomorrow's World and Grandstand. In 2004, he was one of the celebrities that took part in the pro-am dancing contest Strictly Come Dancing on BBC One. In September 2006, he took part in BBC One's Celebrity MasterChef programme, reaching the final along with Matt Dawson and Hardeep Singh Kohli.

He was the subject of This Is Your Life in 1999, when he was surprised by Michael Aspel at Heathrow Airport.

== Writing ==
Black has written an autobiography, published by Andre Deutsch, entitled How Long's the Course? ISBN 0-233-99644-3

== Personal life ==
Black is married to Julia Burgess, with whom he had twin boys George and Max in 2006. Black also has a daughter, Isabelle Black from his previous marriage to French international sprinter Elsa Devassoigne. Isabelle is also an international sprinter representing France. Despite being born in Gosport, and attending the prestigious Portsmouth Grammar School, Black is a supporter of Southampton F.C. In August 2014, Black was one of 200 public figures who were signatories to a letter to The Guardian opposing Scottish independence in the run-up to September's referendum on that issue.

In February 2025, Black revealed he had undergone open heart surgery during the previous month for a condition he was first diagnosed with aged 11 but which had worsened.

== Achievements ==
- 1985
  - European Junior Championships – Cottbus, Germany
    - 400 metres gold medal – 45.36 seconds
    - 4 × 400 m. relay gold medal – 3:07.18
- 1986
  - Commonwealth Games – Edinburgh, Scotland
    - 400 m. gold medal – 45.57 sec.
    - 4 × 400 m. relay gold medal – 3:07.19
  - European Championships – Stuttgart, Germany
    - 400 m. gold medal – 44.59 sec.
    - 4 × 400 m. relay gold medal – 2:59.84
- 1987
  - World Championships – Rome, Italy
    - 4 × 400 m. relay silver medal
- 1990
  - European Championships – Split, Yugoslavia
    - 400 m. gold medal – 45.08 sec.
    - 4 × 400 m. relay gold medal – 2:58.22
- 1991
  - World Championships – Tokyo, Japan
    - 400 m. silver medal – 44.62 sec.
    - 4 × 400 m. relay gold medal – 2:57.53
- 1992
  - Summer Olympics – Barcelona, Spain
    - 4 × 400 m. relay bronze medal – 2:59.73
- 1994
  - European Championships – Helsinki, Finland
    - 400 m. silver medal – 45.2 sec.
    - 4 × 400 m. relay gold medal – 2:59.13
- 1996
  - Summer Olympics – Atlanta, USA
    - 400 m. silver medal – 44.41 sec.
    - 4 × 400 m. relay silver medal – 2:56.60
- 1997
  - World Championships – Athens, Greece
    - 4 × 400 m. relay gold medal – 2:56.65

As of September 2024, Black holds the track record for the men's 400 metres for Frankfurt. On 29/06/1991 aged 25 he ran 44.91 seconds making him the only man to break 45 seconds on this track.
