= 1990 European Athletics Indoor Championships – Men's 400 metres =

The men's 400 metres event at the 1990 European Athletics Indoor Championships was held in Kelvin Hall on 3 and 4 March.

== Medalists ==
Gold	Silver	Bronze
Norbert Dobeleit; West Germany	Jens Carlowitz; East Germany	Cayetano Cornet; Spain

== Results ==
=== Heats ===
First 2 from each heat (Q) and the next 2 fastest (q) qualified for the semifinals.

Rank	Heat	Name	Nationality	Time	Notes
1	2	Cayetano Cornet	Spain	46.69	Q
2	3	Norbert Dobeleit	West Germany	46.88	Q
3	4	Olivier Noirot	France	46.90	Q
4	1	Thomas Schönlebe	East Germany	47.01	Q
5	1	Ervin Katona	Hungary	47.14	Q
6	1	Klaus Just	West Germany	47.14	q
7	3	Jens Carlowitz	East Germany	47.15	Q
8	2	Todd Bennett	Great Britain	47.19	Q
9	4	Carsten Köhrbrück	West Germany	47.20	Q
10	3	Gary Cadogan	Great Britain	47.58	q
11	2	Luboš Balošák	Czechoslovakia	47.85	
12	2	Pedro Curvelo	Portugal	47.97	
13	3	Tamás Molnár	Hungary	48.03	
14	4	Athanassios Kalogiannis	Greece	48.28	
15	4	Andrea Nuti	Italy	48.54	
16	3	Niklas Wallenlind	Sweden	49.04	
17	4	Slobodan Branković	Yugoslavia	49.34	
18	2	Gunnar Guðmundsson	Iceland	49.40	

=== Semifinals ===
First 2 from each semifinal (Q) and the next 1 fastest (q) qualified for the final.

Rank	Heat	Name	Nationality	Time	Notes
1	1	Cayetano Cornet	Spain	46.00	Q
2	1	Jens Carlowitz	East Germany	46.21	Q
3	2	Thomas Schönlebe	East Germany	46.48	Q
4	1	Olivier Noirot	France	46.73	q
5	2	Norbert Dobeleit	West Germany	46.79	Q
6	1	Carsten Köhrbrück	West Germany	46.81	
7	2	Klaus Just	West Germany	46.88	
8	2	Todd Bennett	Great Britain	47.23	
9	1	Gary Cadogan	Great Britain	47.28	
10	2	Ervin Katona	Hungary	48.01	

=== Final ===
Rank	Lane	Name	Nationality	Time	Notes
1st place, gold medalist(s)	5	Norbert Dobeleit	West Germany	46.08	
2nd place, silver medalist(s)	3	Jens Carlowitz	East Germany	46.09	
3rd place, bronze medalist(s)	2	Cayetano Cornet	Spain	46.91	
4	4	Olivier Noirot	France	47.76	
	1	Thomas Schönlebe	East Germany	DNF	
