= Lancine Fofana =

Ivorian sprinter

Personal information
- Nationality: Ivorian
- Born: 15 March 1966 (age 60)

Sport
- Sport: Sprinting
- Event: 4 × 400 metres relay
Medal record
Men's athletics
Representing Ivory Coast
African Championships
Silver medal – second place	1988 Annaba	4×400 m

Lancine Fofana (born 15 March 1966) is an Ivorian sprinter. He competed in the men's 4 × 400 metres relay at the 1988 Summer Olympics.
