= 1988 World Junior Championships in Athletics – Men's 400 metres =

The men's 400 metres event at the 1988 World Junior Championships in Athletics was held in Sudbury, Ontario, Canada, at Laurentian University Stadium on 27, 28 and 29 July.

== Medalists ==
| Gold | Tomasz Jędrusik; Poland |
| Silver | Steve Perry; Australia |
| Bronze | Anthony Eziuka; Nigeria |

== Results ==
=== Final ===
29 July

| Rank | Name | Nationality | Time | Notes |
|---|---|---|---|---|
| 1st place, gold medalist(s) | Tomasz Jędrusik | Poland | 46.19 | |
| 2nd place, silver medalist(s) | Steve Perry | Australia | 46.74 | |
| 3rd place, bronze medalist(s) | Anthony Eziuka | Nigeria | 46.81 | |
| 4 | Mark Richardson | United Kingdom | 46.94 | |
| 5 | Wayne McDonald | United Kingdom | 47.08 | |
| 6 | Joseph Chepsiror Kiptanui | Kenya | 47.22 | |
| 7 | Pedro Cañete | Cuba | 47.28 | |
| 8 | Daniel England | Jamaica | 47.48 | |

=== Semifinals ===
28 July

==== Semifinal 1 ====
| Rank | Name | Nationality | Time | Notes |
|---|---|---|---|---|
| 1 | Steve Perry | Australia | 46.21 | Q |
| 2 | Mark Richardson | United Kingdom | 46.43 | Q |
| 3 | Anthony Eziuka | Nigeria | 46.66 | q |
| 4 | Jerome Williams | United States | 46.89 | |
| 5 | Mark Jackson | Canada | 47.56 | |
| 6 | Shigeaki Matsunaga | Japan | 48.17 | |
| | Joseph Tengelei | Kenya | DQ | |
| | Geoffrey Clark | New Zealand | DQ | |

==== Semifinal 2 ====
| Rank | Name | Nationality | Time | Notes |
|---|---|---|---|---|
| 1 | Wayne McDonald | United Kingdom | 46.29 | Q |
| 2 | Joseph Chepsiror Kiptanui | Kenya | 46.32 | Q |
| 3 | Pedro Cañete | Cuba | 46.86 | q |
| 4 | Jesse Carr | United States | 47.30 | |
| 5 | Thierry Jean-Charles | France | 47.70 | |
| 6 | Kiril Raykov | Bulgaria | 48.74 | |
| 7 | Ilidio Motty | Portugal | 49.82 | |
| | Samuel Matete | Zambia | DQ | |

==== Semifinal 3 ====
| Rank | Name | Nationality | Time | Notes |
|---|---|---|---|---|
| 1 | Tomasz Jędrusik | Poland | 46.16 | Q |
| 2 | Daniel England | Jamaica | 46.71 | Q |
| 3 | Brian Dicker | Canada | 47.29 | |
| 4 | Masaru Komori | Japan | 47.47 | |
| 5 | Anthony Ryan | Australia | 47.62 | |
| 6 | Olivier Noirot | France | 47.68 | |
| 7 | Omokhegbele Okotako | Nigeria | 49.26 | |
| 8 | Nicolás Rodríguez | Argentina | 49.93 | |

=== Heats ===
27 July

==== Heat 1 ====
| Rank | Name | Nationality | Time | Notes |
|---|---|---|---|---|
| 1 | Daniel England | Jamaica | 47.18 | Q |
| 2 | Pedro Cañete | Cuba | 47.43 | Q |
| 3 | Mark Jackson | Canada | 47.64 | Q |
| 4 | Joseph Tengelei | Kenya | 48.02 | q |
| 5 | Inaldo de Sena | Brazil | 48.30 | |
| 6 | Muhammad Sadaqat | Pakistan | 49.33 | |
| | José Hernández | Puerto Rico | DQ | |

==== Heat 2 ====
| Rank | Name | Nationality | Time | Notes |
|---|---|---|---|---|
| 1 | Joseph Chepsiror Kiptanui | Kenya | 46.54 | Q |
| 2 | Mark Richardson | United Kingdom | 46.63 | Q |
| 3 | Olivier Noirot | France | 47.43 | Q |
| 4 | Brian Dicker | Canada | 47.70 | q |
| 5 | Feru Dadi | Ethiopia | 48.24 | |
| 6 | Gilmar da Silva | Brazil | 49.97 | |
| 7 | Mitchell Peters | U.S. Virgin Islands | 50.17 | |
| 8 | Gilbert Hashan | Mauritius | 50.19 | |

==== Heat 3 ====
| Rank | Name | Nationality | Time | Notes |
|---|---|---|---|---|
| 1 | Samuel Matete | Zambia | 46.88 | Q |
| 2 | Thierry Jean-Charles | France | 47.20 | Q |
| 3 | Masaru Komori | Japan | 47.49 | Q |
| 4 | Omokhegbele Okotako | Nigeria | 47.73 | q |
| 5 | Eversley Linley | Saint Vincent and the Grenadines | 48.65 | |
| 6 | Ibrahim Abdirashid Aden | Somalia | 49.00 | |
| 7 | Eric Krings | Guatemala | 50.71 | |
| 8 | Legesse Dereba | Ethiopia | 51.10 | |

==== Heat 4 ====
| Rank | Name | Nationality | Time | Notes |
|---|---|---|---|---|
| 1 | Anthony Ryan | Australia | 47.08 | Q |
| 2 | Jesse Carr | United States | 47.49 | Q |
| 3 | Geoffrey Clark | New Zealand | 47.63 | Q |
| 4 | Miguel Cuesta | Spain | 48.29 | |
| 5 | Raffaele Altissimo | Italy | 48.54 | |
| | Barrington Campbell | Jamaica | DNF | |

==== Heat 5 ====
| Rank | Name | Nationality | Time | Notes |
|---|---|---|---|---|
| 1 | Anthony Eziuka | Nigeria | 47.29 | Q |
| 2 | Jerome Williams | United States | 47.34 | Q |
| 3 | Ilidio Motty | Portugal | 47.92 | Q |
| 4 | Joel Otim-Bua | Uganda | 48.10 | |
| 5 | Gianrico Boncompagni | Italy | 48.23 | |
| 6 | William Archer | British Virgin Islands | 52.60 | |

==== Heat 6 ====
| Rank | Name | Nationality | Time | Notes |
|---|---|---|---|---|
| 1 | Steve Perry | Australia | 46.79 | Q |
| 2 | Kiril Raykov | Bulgaria | 48.05 | Q |
| 3 | Nicolás Rodríguez | Argentina | 49.12 | Q |
| 4 | Peter Merchant | Antigua and Barbuda | 50.68 | |
| | Yeóryios Panayiotopoulos | Greece | DQ | |

==== Heat 7 ====
| Rank | Name | Nationality | Time | Notes |
|---|---|---|---|---|
| 1 | Tomasz Jędrusik | Poland | 46.50 | Q |
| 2 | Wayne McDonald | United Kingdom | 47.58 | Q |
| 3 | Shigeaki Matsunaga | Japan | 48.02 | Q |
| 4 | Lin Kuang-Liang | Chinese Taipei | 48.15 | |
| 5 | Aurelio Mancheno | Ecuador | 48.63 | |
| 6 | Grzegorz Machelski | Poland | 48.74 | |

== Participation ==
According to an unofficial count, 46 athletes from 33 countries participated in the event.

- Antigua and Barbuda (1)
- Argentina (1)
- Australia (2)
- Brazil (2)
- British Virgin Islands (1)
- Bulgaria (1)
- Canada (2)
- Chinese Taipei (1)
- Cuba (1)
- Ecuador (1)
- Ethiopia (2)
- France (2)
- Greece (1)
- Guatemala (1)
- Italy (2)
- Jamaica (2)
- Japan (2)
- Kenya (2)
- Mauritius (1)
- New Zealand (1)
- Nigeria (2)
- Pakistan (1)
- Poland (2)
- Portugal (1)
- Puerto Rico (1)
- Saint Vincent and the Grenadines (1)
- Somalia (1)
- Spain (1)
- Uganda (1)
- United Kingdom (2)
- United States (2)
- U.S. Virgin Islands (1)
- Zambia (1)
