= Muhammad Afzal (athlete) =

Pakistani sprinter (born 1967)

Personal information
- Nationality: Pakistani
- Born: 1 September 1967 (age 59)

Sport
- Sport: Sprinting
- Event: 100 metres

Muhammad Afzal (born 1 September 1967) is a Pakistani sprinter. He competed in the men's 100 metres, men's 200 metres and men's 4 × 400 metres at the 1988 Summer Olympics.
