= Bashir Ahmad (athlete) =

Pakistani sprinter (born 1967)

Personal information
- Nationality: Pakistani
- Born: 10 June 1967 (age 59)

Sport
- Sport: Sprinting
- Event: 4 × 400 metres relay

Bashir Ahmad (born 10 June 1967) is a Pakistani sprinter. He competed in the men's 4 × 400 metres relay at the 1988 Summer Olympics.
