= 1986 Pan American Junior Athletics Championships =

IV Pan American Junior Athletics Championships
- Dates: July 4–6
- Host city: Winter Park, United States
- Level: Junior
- Events: 38
- Participation: about 251 athletes from 25 nations

The 4th Pan American Junior Athletics Championships were held at Showalter Stadium in Winter Park, Florida, on July 4–6, 1986.

== Participation (unofficial) ==
Detailed result lists can be found on the "World Junior Athletics History" website. An unofficial count yields the number of about 251 athletes from about 25 countries: Antigua and Barbuda (1), Argentina (7), Bahamas (7), Barbados (5), Bermuda (5), Brazil (16), British Virgin Islands (1), Canada (55), Cayman Islands (1), Chile (4), Colombia (4), Costa Rica (1), Cuba (34), Ecuador (2), Grenada (1), Guyana (2), Jamaica (9), Mexico (6), Panama (2), Paraguay (2), Peru (3), Puerto Rico (7), Saint Kitts and Nevis (2), Turks and Caicos Islands (5), United States (69).

== Medal summary ==
Medal winners are published. Complete results can be found on the "World Junior Athletics History" website.

=== Men ===
Event	Gold		Silver		Bronze	
100 metres	Stanley Kerr (USA)	10.20	Mike Marsh (USA)	10.23	Luis Smith (PAN)	10.53
200 metres	Roberto Hernández (CUB)	20.83	Derrick Florence (USA)	21.64	Eulogio Mordoche (CUB)	21.78
400 metres	Roberto Hernández (CUB)	45.64	Clifton Campbell (USA)	46.43	Eulogio Mordoche (CUB)	46.63
800 metres	Manuel Balmaceda (CHI)	1:50.41	Anthony Christie (JAM)	1:51.07	Eduardo Carrera (MEX)	1:51.39
1500 metres	Carson Hoeft (USA)	3:51.10	John Quade (USA)	3:51.37	Richard Charett (CAN)	3:52.10
5000 metres	Greg Anderson (CAN)	14:12.54	Ignacio Fragoso (MEX)	14:18.31	Ángel Rodríguez (CUB)	14:23.51
2000 metres steeplechase	Ángel Rodríguez (CUB)	5:41.64	José Pestana (CUB)	5:44.05	Steve Conwell (CAN)	5:45.24
110 metres hurdles	Emilio Valle (CUB)	14.16	Jamie Hence (USA)	14.30	Herman Clark (USA)	14.55
400 metres hurdles	Emilio Valle (CUB)	51.33	Kevin Mason (USA)	51.60	Michael Graham (USA)	51.99
4 × 100 metres relay	United States; Mike Marsh; Derrick Florence; William Reed; Stanley Kerr	39.76	Cuba ? ? Roberto Hernández; Joel Isasi	40.62	Bahamas ? Mark Johnson; Glendale Miller; Michael Newbold	40.76
4 × 400 metres relay	Cuba; Luis Cadogan; Eulogio Mordoche; Ramiro González; Roberto Hernández	3:04.30	United States; Clois Carter; Chip Rish; Percy Waddle; Clifton Campbell	3:05.44	Jamaica	3:06.46
10,000 metres track walk	Carlos Mercenario (MEX)	43:06.80	Benoît Gauthier (CAN)	47:16.19	Mario Álvarez (CUB)	48:07.28
High jump	Javier Sotomayor (CUB)	2.27	Hollis Conway (USA)	2.24	Joey Johnson (USA)	2.12
Pole vault	Tim McMichael (USA)	4.80	Pat Manson (USA)	4.80	Miguel Saldarriaga (COL)	4.70
Long jump	Scott Sanders (USA)	7.74	Lisandro Milhet (CUB)	7.51	Rod Tolbert (USA)	7.51
Triple jump	Juan Miguel López (CUB)	16.49	Brian Wellman (BER)	16.18	Dudson Higgins (BAH)	16.11
Shot put	Tonyo Sylvester (USA)	16.94	Darren Crawford (USA)	16.08	Delore Lakusta (CAN)	15.92
Discus throw	Brent Patera (USA)	51.78	Alexis Elizalde (CUB)	50.88	Steven Yates (USA)	49.30
Hammer throw	Eldon Pfeiffer (CAN)	61.24	René Díaz (CUB)	60.18	Adrián Marzo (ARG)	56.16
Javelin throw	Juan Oxamendi (CUB)	70.84	Jorge Hernández (CUB)	70.10	Roy Seidmeyer (USA)	69.26
Decathlon	Miguel Valle (CUB)	6900	Shawn Collins (USA)	6213	Leonard Richardson (SKN)	5230

=== Women ===
Event	Gold		Silver		Bronze	
100 metres	Caryl Smith (USA)	11.56w	Maicel Malone (USA)	11.58w	Katie Anderson (CAN)	11.69w
200 metres	Carlette Guidry (USA)	23.73	Maicel Malone (USA)	23.97	Ximena Restrepo (COL)	24.54
400 metres	Sandie Richards (JAM)	52.48	Janeene Vickers (USA)	52.66	Tasha Downing (USA)	53.61
800 metres	Andrea Thomas (JAM)	2:07.33	Jasmin Jones (USA)	2:07.80	Maura Savón (CUB)	2:07.93
1500 metres	Suzy Favor (USA)	4:26.84	Susannah Beck (USA)	4:33.46	Maura Savón (CUB)	4:33.52
3000 metres	Maricarmen Díaz (MEX)	9:42.49	Heather Ostic (CAN)	9:42.96	Kim Widener (USA)	9:45.81
100 metres hurdles	Yolanda Johnson (USA)	13.38	Aliuska López (CUB)	13.53	Tanya Davis (USA)	14.06
400 metres hurdles	Jill McDermid (CAN)	59.62	Shawn Moore (USA)	60.67	Kellie Roberts (USA)	60.76
4 × 100 metres relay	United States; Carlette Guidry; Caryl Smith; Denise Liles; Maicel Malone	44.62	Canada	46.00	Jamaica	46.37
4 × 400 metres relay	United States; Gisele Harris; Kandice Princhett; Tasha Downing; Janeene Vickers	3:35.81	Canada	3:40.26	Jamaica	3:41.56
3000 metres Track Walk	Laura Rigutto (CAN)	15:16.83	Edith Monetit (CAN)	15:34.45	Deirdre Collier (USA)	15:46.82
High jump	Fernanda Mosquera (COL)	1.80	Holly Kelly (USA)	1.76	Karen DiDonato (USA)	1.76
Long jump	Carlette Guidry (USA)	6.42	Tonya Sedwick (USA)	6.22	Niurka Montalvo (CUB)	5.95w
Shot put	Brandi Gail (USA)	14.10	Idalmis Leyva (CUB)	13.77	Amy Werkowski (USA)	13.41
Discus throw	Idalmis Leyva (CUB)	51.98	Tracy Crawford (USA)	48.08	Michelle Brotherton (CAN)	48.06
Javelin throw	Xiomara Rivero (CUB)	60.86	Isel López (CUB)	53.36	Jane Woodhead (USA)	49.26
Heptathlon	Kelly-Anne Kempf (CAN)	5045	Peggy Odita (USA)	5013	Pam Connell (USA)	4767

== Medal table (unofficial) ==
* Host nation (United States)

Rank	Nation	Gold	Silver	Bronze	Total
1	United States*	15	21	15	51
2	Cuba	12	9	7	28
3	Canada	5	5	5	15
4	Jamaica	2	1	3	6
5	Mexico	2	1	1	4
6	Colombia	1	0	2	3
7	Chile	1	0	0	1
8	Bermuda	0	1	0	1
9	Bahamas	0	0	2	2
10	Argentina	0	0	1	1
10	Panama	0	0	1	1
10	Saint Kitts and Nevis	0	0	1	1
Totals (12 entries)		38	38	38	114
