= Hirofumi Koike =

Japanese sprinter (born 1962)

Personal information
- Nationality: Japanese
- Born: 1 October 1962 (age 63)

Sport
- Sport: Sprinting
- Event: 4 × 400 metres relay
Medal record
Representing Japan
Asian Games
Silver medal – second place	1986 Seoul	4x100m relay

Hirofumi Koike (小池 弘文, Koike Hirofumi; born 1 October 1962) is a Japanese sprinter. He competed in the men's 4 × 400 metres relay at the 1988 Summer Olympics.
