= 1990 European Athletics Championships – Men's 400 metres =

Men's 400 metres at the European Athletics Championships

These are the official results of the Men's 400 metres event at the 1990 European Championships in Split, Yugoslavia, held at Stadion Poljud on 28, 29, and 30 August 1990.

== Medalists ==
Gold	Roger Black; United Kingdom
Silver	Thomas Schönlebe; East Germany
Bronze	Jens Carlowitz; East Germany

== Results ==
=== Final ===
30 August

Rank	Name	Nationality	Time	Notes
1st place, gold medalist(s)	Roger Black	United Kingdom	45.08	
2nd place, silver medalist(s)	Thomas Schönlebe	East Germany	45.13	
3rd place, bronze medalist(s)	Jens Carlowitz	East Germany	45.27	
4	Gaietà Cornet	Spain	45.30	
5	Norbert Dobeleit	West Germany	45.42	
6	Slobodan Branković	Yugoslavia	45.49	
7	Nenad Đurović	Yugoslavia	46.19	
8	Tomasz Jędrusik	Poland	46.25	

=== Semi-finals ===
29 August

==== Semi-final 1 ====
Rank	Name	Nationality	Time	Notes
1	Roger Black	United Kingdom	45.46	Q
2	Thomas Schönlebe	East Germany	45.66	Q
3	Nenad Đurović	Yugoslavia	45.67	Q
4	Tomasz Jędrusik	Poland	45.80	Q
5	Paul Sanders	United Kingdom	46.06	
6	Olivier Noirot	France	46.07	
7	Andrea Nuti	Italy	46.11	
	Jörg Vaihinger	West Germany	DNS	

==== Semi-final 2 ====
Rank	Name	Nationality	Time	Notes
1	Gaietà Cornet	Spain	45.00	Q
2	Jens Carlowitz	East Germany	45.15	Q
3	Norbert Dobeleit	West Germany	45.15	Q
4	Slobodan Branković	Yugoslavia	45.30	Q
5	Dejan Jovković	Yugoslavia	46.07	
6	Dmitriy Golovastov	Soviet Union	46.22	
7	Lewis Samuel	United Kingdom	46.98	
8	Roberto Ribaud	Italy	47.39	

=== Heats ===
28 August

==== Heat 1 ====
Rank	Name	Nationality	Time	Notes
1	Roger Black	United Kingdom	45.53	Q
2	Slobodan Branković	Yugoslavia	45.77	Q
3	Tomasz Jędrusik	Poland	45.92	Q
4	Thomas Schönlebe	East Germany	45.98	Q
5	Dmitriy Golovastov	Soviet Union	46.15	q
6	Roberto Ribaud	Italy	46.54	q
7	Jörg Vaihinger	West Germany	46.56	q
8	Antonio Sánchez	Spain	46.99	

==== Heat 2 ====
Rank	Name	Nationality	Time	Notes
1	Norbert Dobeleit	West Germany	45.71	Q
2	Jens Carlowitz	East Germany	46.10	Q
3	Olivier Noirot	France	46.14	Q
4	Lewis Samuel	United Kingdom	46.74	Q
5	Dejan Jovković	Yugoslavia	46.79	q
6	José Luis Palacios	Spain	46.90	
7	Ari Pinomäki	Finland	47.16	
8	Aleksey Petukhov	Soviet Union	47.46	

==== Heat 3 ====
Rank	Name	Nationality	Time	Notes
1	Gaietà Cornet	Spain	46.07	Q
2	Nenad Đurović	Yugoslavia	46.42	Q
3	Andrea Nuti	Italy	46.61	Q
4	Paul Sanders	United Kingdom	46.75	Q
5	Tamás Molnár	Hungary	46.80	
6	Aivar Ojastu	Soviet Union	46.85	
	Klaus Just	West Germany	DNF	

== Participation ==
According to an unofficial count, 22 athletes from 11 countries participated in the event.

- East Germany (2)
- Finland (1)
- France (1)
- Hungary (1)
- Italy (2)
- Poland (1)
- Soviet Union (3)
- Spain (3)
- United Kingdom (3)
- West Germany (2)
- Yugoslavia (3)

== See also ==
- 1988 Men's Olympic 400 metres (Seoul)
- 1991 Men's World Championships 400 metres (Tokyo)
- 1992 Men's Olympic 400 metres (Barcelona)
