= Michael Schimmer =

German sprinter

Personal information
- Nationality: German
- Born: 10 January 1967 (age 59)

Sport
- Sport: Sprinting
- Event: 4 × 400 metres relay

Michael Schimmer (born 10 January 1967) is a German sprinter. He competed in the men's 4 × 400 metres relay at the 1988 Summer Olympics, representing East Germany.
