= Tamás Molnár (sprinter) =

Hungarian sprinter

Personal information
- Born: July 23, 1968 Nyíregyháza, Hungary
- Height: 1.83 m (6 ft 0 in)
- Weight: 75 kg (165 lb)

Sport
- Sport: Athletics
- Event: 400 metres
- Club: Nyíregyházi Vasutas SC

Tamás Molnár (born 23 July 1968) is a Hungarian former sprinter who competed primarily in the 400 metres. He represented his country at the 1992 Summer Olympics as well as two World Championships. In addition, he won a bronze medal at the 1987 European Junior Championships.

== International competitions ==
Year	Competition	Venue	Position	Event	Notes
Representing Hungary
1986	World Junior Championships	Athens, Greece	54th (h)	200 m	22.45
1986	World Junior Championships	Athens, Greece	12th (sf)	400 m	46.96
1987	European Junior Championships	Birmingham, United Kingdom	3rd	400 m	46.68
1987	World Championships	Rome, Italy	36th (h)	400 m	46.80
1988	European Indoor Championships	Budapest, Hungary	7th (sf)	200 m	21.24
1989	Universiade	Duisburg, West Germany	16th (h)	200 m	21.32
1990	European Indoor Championships	Glasgow, United Kingdom	13th (h)	400 m	48.03
1990	European Championships	Split, Yugoslavia	17th (h)	400 m	46.80
1991	World Championships	Tokyo, Japan	23rd (qf)	400 m	46.47
1992	Olympic Games	Barcelona, Spain	29th (qf)	400 m	46.80

== Personal bests ==
Outdoor

- 100 metres – 10.72 (+1.6 m/s, Budapest 1985)
- 200 metres – 20.64 (-1.2 m/s, Norman 1990)
- 400 metres – 45.44 (Durham 1990)

Indoor

- 60 metres – 7.10 (Budapest 1985)
- 200 metres – 21.24 (Budapest 1988)
- 400 metres – 46.37 (Lincoln 1990)
