= Athletics at the 1988 Summer Olympics =

Athletics at the Games of the XXIV Olympiad
- Host stadium (shown in 2020)
- No. of events: 42
- Competitors: 1,617 from 149 nations

At the 1988 Summer Olympics in Seoul a total number of 42 events in athletics were contested: 24 by men and 18 by women. There were a total number of 1617 participating athletes from 149 countries.

== Medal summary ==
=== Men ===
Event	Gold		Silver		Bronze	
100 metres	Carl Lewis; United States	9.92 (WR)	Linford Christie; Great Britain	9.97 (AR)	Calvin Smith; United States	9.99
200 metres	Joe DeLoach; United States	19.75 (OR)	Carl Lewis; United States	19.79	Robson Caetano; Brazil	20.04
400 metres	Steve Lewis; United States	43.87	Butch Reynolds; United States	43.93	Danny Everett; United States	44.09
800 metres	Paul Ereng; Kenya	1:43.45	Joaquim Cruz; Brazil	1:43.90	Saïd Aouita; Morocco	1:44.06
1500 metres	Peter Rono; Kenya	3:35.96	Peter Elliott; Great Britain	3:36.15	Jens-Peter Herold; East Germany	3:36.21
5000 metres	John Ngugi; Kenya	13:11.70	Dieter Baumann; West Germany	13:15.52	Hansjörg Kunze; East Germany	13:15.73
10,000 metres	Brahim Boutayeb; Morocco	27:21.44 (OR)	Salvatore Antibo; Italy	27:23.55	Kipkemboi Kimeli; Kenya	27:25.16
110 metres hurdles	Roger Kingdom; United States	12.98 (OR)	Colin Jackson; Great Britain	13.28	Tonie Campbell; United States	13.38
400 metres hurdles	Andre Phillips; United States	47.19 (OR)	Amadou Dia Ba; Senegal	47.23 (NR)	Edwin Moses; United States	47.56
3000 metres steeplechase	Julius Kariuki; Kenya	8:05.51 (OR)	Peter Koech; Kenya	8:06.79	Mark Rowland; Great Britain	8:07.96
4 × 100 metres relay	Soviet Union; Viktor Bryzhin; Vladimir Krylov; Vladimir Muravyov; Vitaliy Savin	38.19	Great Britain; Elliot Bunney; John Regis; Linford Christie; Mike McFarlane; Clarence Callender*	38.28	France; Bruno Marie-Rose; Daniel Sangouma; Gilles Quenehervé; Max Morinière	38.40
4 × 400 metres relay	United States; Danny Everett; Steve Lewis; Kevin Robinzine; Butch Reynolds; Antonio McKay*; Andrew Valmon*	2:56.16	Jamaica; Howard Davis; Devon Morris; Winthrop Graham; Bert Cameron; Trevor Graham*; Howard Burnett*	3:00.30	West Germany; Norbert Dobeleit; Edgar Itt; Jörg Vaihinger; Ralf Lübke; Mark Henrich*; Bodo Kuhn*	3:00.56
Marathon	Gelindo Bordin; Italy	2:10:32	Douglas Wakiihuri; Kenya	2:10:47	Hussein Ahmed Salah; Djibouti	2:10:59
20 kilometres walk	Jozef Pribilinec; Czechoslovakia	1:19:57 (OR)	Ronald Weigel; East Germany	1:20:00	Maurizio Damilano; Italy	1:20:14
50 kilometres walk	Vyacheslav Ivanenko; Soviet Union	3:38:29 (OR)	Ronald Weigel; East Germany	3:38:56	Hartwig Gauder; East Germany	3:39:45
High jump	Hennadiy Avdyeyenko; Soviet Union	2.38 m (OR)	Hollis Conway; United States	2.36 m	Rudolf Povarnitsyn; Soviet Union	2.36 m
High jump	Hennadiy Avdyeyenko; Soviet Union	2.38 m (OR)	Hollis Conway; United States	2.36 m	Patrik Sjöberg; Sweden	2.36 m
Pole vault	Sergey Bubka; Soviet Union	5.90 m (OR)	Radion Gataullin; Soviet Union	5.85 m	Grigoriy Yegorov; Soviet Union	5.80 m
Long jump	Carl Lewis; United States	8.72 m	Mike Powell; United States	8.49 m	Larry Myricks; United States	8.27 m
Triple jump	Khristo Markov; Bulgaria	17.61 m (OR)	Igor Lapshin; Soviet Union	17.52 m	Aleksandr Kovalenko; Soviet Union	17.42 m
Shot put	Ulf Timmermann; East Germany	22.47 m (OR)	Randy Barnes; United States	22.39 m	Werner Günthör; Switzerland	21.99 m
Discus throw	Jürgen Schult; East Germany	68.82 m (OR)	Romas Ubartas; Soviet Union	67.48 m	Rolf Danneberg; West Germany	67.38 m
Hammer throw	Sergey Litvinov; Soviet Union	84.80 m (OR)	Yuriy Sedykh; Soviet Union	83.76 m	Jüri Tamm; Soviet Union	81.16 m
Javelin throw	Tapio Korjus; Finland	84.28 m	Jan Železný; Czechoslovakia	84.12 m	Seppo Räty; Finland	83.26 m
Decathlon	Christian Schenk; East Germany	8488	Torsten Voss; East Germany	8399	Dave Steen; Canada	8328

=== Women ===
Games	Gold		Silver		Bronze	
100 metres	Florence Griffith Joyner; United States	10.54w (OR)	Evelyn Ashford; United States	10.83w	Heike Drechsler; East Germany	10.85w
200 metres	Florence Griffith Joyner; United States	21.34 (WR)	Grace Jackson; Jamaica	21.72	Heike Drechsler; East Germany	21.95
400 metres	Olha Bryzhina; Soviet Union	48.65 (OR)	Petra Müller; East Germany	49.45	Olga Nazarova; Soviet Union	49.90
800 metres	Sigrun Wodars; East Germany	1:56.10	Christine Wachtel; East Germany	1:56.64	Kim Gallagher; United States	1:56.91
1500 metres	Paula Ivan; Romania	3:53.96 (OR)	Laimutė Baikauskaitė; Soviet Union	4:00.24	Tetyana Samolenko; Soviet Union	4:00.30
3000 metres	Tetyana Samolenko; Soviet Union	8:26.53 (OR)	Paula Ivan; Romania	8:27.15	Yvonne Murray; Great Britain	8:29.02
10,000 metres	Olga Bondarenko; Soviet Union	31:05.21 (OR)	Liz McColgan; Great Britain	31:08.44	Olena Zhupiyeva; Soviet Union	31:19.82
100 metres hurdles	Yordanka Donkova; Bulgaria	12.38 (OR)	Gloria Siebert; East Germany	12.61	Claudia Zaczkiewicz; West Germany	12.75
400 metres hurdles	Debbie Flintoff-King; Australia	53.17 (OR)	Tatyana Ledovskaya; Soviet Union	53.18	Ellen Fiedler; East Germany	53.63
4 × 100 metres relay	United States; Alice Brown; Sheila Echols; Florence Griffith Joyner; Evelyn Ashford; Dannette Young*	41.98	East Germany; Silke Möller; Kerstin Behrendt; Ingrid Lange; Marlies Göhr	42.09	Soviet Union; Lyudmila Kondratyeva; Galina Malchugina; Marina Zhirova; Natalya Pomoshchnikova; Maia Azarashvili*	42.75
4 × 400 metres relay	Soviet Union; Tatyana Ledovskaya; Olga Nazarova; Mariya Pinigina; Olha Bryzhina; Lyudmyla Dzhyhalova*	3:15.17 (WR)	United States; Denean Howard; Diane Dixon; Valerie Brisco-Hooks; Florence Griffith Joyner; Sherri Howard*; Lillie Leatherwood*	3:15.51 (AR)	East Germany; Dagmar Neubauer; Kirsten Emmelmann; Sabine Busch; Petra Müller; Grit Breuer*	3:18.29
Marathon	Rosa Mota; Portugal	2:25:40	Lisa Martin-Ondieki; Australia	2:25:53	Katrin Dörre; East Germany	2:26:21
High jump	Louise Ritter; United States	2.03 m (OR)	Stefka Kostadinova; Bulgaria	2.01 m	Tamara Bykova; Soviet Union	1.99 m
Long jump	Jackie Joyner-Kersee; United States	7.40 m (OR)	Heike Drechsler; East Germany	7.22 m	Galina Chistyakova; Soviet Union	7.11 m
Shot put	Natalya Lisovskaya; Soviet Union	22.24 m	Kathrin Neimke; East Germany	21.07 m	Li Meisu; China	21.06 m
Discus throw	Martina Hellmann; East Germany	72.30 m (OR)	Diana Gansky; East Germany	71.88 m	Tsvetanka Khristova; Bulgaria	69.74 m
Javelin throw	Petra Felke; East Germany	74.68 m (OR)	Fatima Whitbread; Great Britain	70.32 m	Beate Koch; East Germany	67.30 m
Heptathlon	Jackie Joyner-Kersee; United States	7291 (WR)	Sabine John; East Germany	6897	Anke Behmer; East Germany	6858

- * = Athletes who ran in preliminary rounds and also received medals.

== Medal table ==
Rank	Nation	Gold	Silver	Bronze	Total
1	United States	13	7	6	26
2	Soviet Union	10	6	10	26
3	East Germany	6	11	10	27
4	Kenya	4	2	1	7
5	Bulgaria	2	1	1	4
6	Italy	1	1	1	3
7	Australia	1	1	0	2
7	Czechoslovakia	1	1	0	2
7	Romania	1	1	0	2
10	Finland	1	0	1	2
10	Morocco	1	0	1	2
12	Portugal	1	0	0	1
13	Great Britain	0	6	2	8
14	Jamaica	0	2	0	2
15	West Germany	0	1	3	4
16	Brazil	0	1	1	2
17	Senegal	0	1	0	1
18	Canada	0	0	1	1
18	China	0	0	1	1
18	Djibouti	0	0	1	1
18	France	0	0	1	1
18	Sweden	0	0	1	1
18	Switzerland	0	0	1	1
Totals (23 entries)		42	42	43	127

== See also ==
- 1988 in athletics (track and field)
