= 1986 World Junior Championships in Athletics =

International athletics competition

- Host city: Athens, Greece
- Nations: 142
- Athletes: 1135
- Events: 41
- Dates: 16–20 July
- Main venue: Athens Olympic Stadium

The 1986 World Junior Championships in Athletics was the inaugural 1986 edition of the World Junior Championships in Athletics. It was held in Athens, Greece on 16–20 July.

== Results ==
=== Men ===
Event	Gold		Silver		Bronze	
100 metres	Derrick Florence; United States	10.17	Stanley Kerr; United States	10.23	Jamie Henderson; Great Britain	10.34
200 metres	Stanley Kerr; United States	20.74	Derrick Florence; United States	21.12	Steve McBain; Australia	21.21
400 metres	Miles Murphy; Australia	45.64	Roberto Hernández; Cuba	45.64	Edgar Itt; West Germany	45.72
800 metres	David Sharpe; Great Britain	1:48.32	Manuel Balmaceda; Chile	1:48.91	Andrey Sudnik; Soviet Union	1:48.93
1500 metres	Wilfred Kirochi; Kenya	3:44.62	Peter Rono; Kenya	3:45.62	Johan Boakes; Great Britain	3:45.80
5000 metres	Peter Chumba; Kenya	13:55.25	Alejandro Gómez; Spain	13:55.94	Feyisa Melese; Ethiopia	13:56.45
10,000 metres	Peter Chumba; Kenya	28:44.00	Juma Munyampanda; Tanzania	28:45.14	Debebe Demisse; Ethiopia	28:49.09
20 kilometres road run	Tadesse Gebre; Ethiopia	1:01:32	Juma Munyampanda; Tanzania	1:01:45	Negash Dube; Ethiopia	1:04:23
110 metres hurdles	Colin Jackson; Great Britain	13.44	Jon Ridgeon; Great Britain	13.91	Emilio Valle; Cuba	14.00
400 metres hurdles	Emilio Valle; Cuba	50.02	Hiroshi Kakimori; Japan	50.09	Pascal Maran; France	50.39
2000 metres steeplechase	Jon Azkueta; Spain	5:28.56	Johnstone Kipkoech; Kenya	5:29.56	Jens Volkmann; West Germany	5:29.60
10,000 metres walk	Mikhail Shchennikov; Soviet Union	40:38.01	Salvatore Cacia; Italy	40:40.73	Ricardo Pueyo; Spain	40:41.05
4 × 100 metres relay	Great Britain; Jamie Henderson; Phil Goedluck; David Kirton; Jon Ridgeon	39.80	West Germany; Matthias Schlicht; Frank Kobor; Oliver Schmidt; Ingo Todt	39.81	Poland; Jarosław Kaniecki; Tomasz Jędrusik; Jacek Konopka; Marek Parjaszewski	39.98
4 × 400 metres relay	United States; Clifton Campbell; Chip Rish; Percy Waddle; William Reed	3:01.90	Cuba; Luis Cadogan; Eulogio Mordoche; Ramiro González; Roberto Hernández	3:04.22	Jamaica; Anthony Christie; Thomas Mason; Howard Davis; Lyndale Patterson	3:05.16
High jump	Javier Sotomayor; Cuba	2.25	Hollis Conway; United States	2.22	Thomas Müller; East Germany	2.22
Pole vault	Igor Potapovich; Soviet Union	5.50	Delko Lesev; Bulgaria	5.40	Mike Thiede; East Germany	5.30
Long jump	Dietmar Haaf; West Germany	7.93	Ivo Krsek; Czechoslovakia	7.87	Thomas Wolf; East Germany	7.77
Triple jump	Igor Parygin; Soviet Union	16.97	Zdravko Dimitrov; Bulgaria	16.13	Du Benghong; China	16.00
Shot put	Aleksejs Lukašenko; Soviet Union	18.90	Vyacheslav Lykho; Soviet Union	18.71	Radoslav Despotov; Bulgaria	18.17
Discus throw	Vasil Baklarov; Bulgaria	60.60	Werner Reiterer; Australia	58.64	Vasiliy Kaptyukh; Soviet Union	58.22
Hammer throw	Vitaliy Alisevich; Soviet Union	72.00	Valeriy Gubkin; Soviet Union	71.78	Sabin Khristov; Bulgaria	68.96
Javelin throw	Uladzimir Sasimovich; Soviet Union	78.84	Mark Roberson; Great Britain	74.24	Gavin Lovegrove; New Zealand	74.22
Decathlon	Petri Keskitalo; Finland	7623	Mike Smith; Canada	7523	Nikolay Zayats; Soviet Union	7509
WR world record | AR area record | CR championship record | GR games record | NR national record | OR Olympic record | PB personal best | SB season best | WL world leading (in a given season)

=== Women ===
Event	Gold		Silver		Bronze	
100 metres	Tina Iheagwam; Nigeria	11.34	Caryl Smith; United States	11.46	Maicel Malone; United States	11.49
200 metres	Falilat Ogunkoya; Nigeria	23.11	Mary Onyali; Nigeria	23.30	Katrin Krabbe; East Germany	23.31
400 metres	Susann Sieger; East Germany	52.02	Olga Pesnopevtseva; Soviet Union	52.17	Sandie Richards; Jamaica	52.23
800 metres	Selina Chirchir; Kenya	2:01.40	Gabriela Sedláková; Czechoslovakia	2:01.49	Adriana Dumitru; Romania	2:01.93
1500 metres	Ana Padurean; Romania	4:14.63	Selina Chirchir; Kenya	4:15.59	Snežana Pajkić; Yugoslavia	4:16.03
3000 metres	Cleopatra Palacian; Romania	9:02.91	Philippa Mason; Great Britain	9:03.35	Dorina Calenic; Romania	9:06.94
10,000 metres	Katrin Kley; East Germany	33:19.67	Nora Maraga; Kenya	33:57.99	Marleen Renders; Belgium	33:59.36
100 metres hurdles	Heike Tillack; East Germany	13.10	Aliuska López; Cuba	13.14	Tanya Davis; United States	13.46
400 metres hurdles	Claudia Bartl; East Germany	56.76	Kellie Roberts; United States	56.80	Svetlana Lukashevich; Soviet Union	57.92
5000 metres walk	Wang Yan; China	22:03.65	Natalya Zykova; Soviet Union	22:17.76	Jin Bingjie; China	22:17.83
4 × 100 metres relay	United States; Carlette Guidry; Caryl Smith; Denise Liles; Maicel Malone	43.78	East Germany; Ina Morgenstern; Katrin Krabbe; Britta Beisbier; Heike Tillack	43.97	Nigeria; Tina Iheagwam; Caroline Nwajei; Falilat Ogunkoya; Mary Onyali	44.13
4 × 400 metres relay	United States; Gisele Harris; Kandice Princhett; Tasha Downing; Janeene Vickers	3:30.45	East Germany; Heike Böckmann; Claudia Bartl; Katja Prochnow; Susanne Sieger	3:30.90	Soviet Union; Svetlana Lukashevich; Marina Khripankova; Tatyana Chebykina; Olga Pesnopevtseva	3:32.35
High jump	Karen Scholz; East Germany	1.92	Galina Astafei; Romania	1.90	Yelena Obukhova; Soviet Union	1.88
Long jump	Patricia Bille; East Germany	6.70	Anu Kaljurand; Soviet Union	6.46	Tatyana Ter-Mesrobyan; Soviet Union	6.39
Shot put	Heike Rohrmann; East Germany	18.39	Stephanie Storp; West Germany	18.20	Ines Wittich; East Germany	18.19
Discus throw	Ilke Wyludda; East Germany	64.02	Franka Dietzsch; East Germany	60.26	Min Chunfeng; China	54.00
Javelin throw	Xiomara Rivero; Cuba	62.86	Anja Reiter; East Germany	60.24	Alexandra Beck; East Germany	59.92
Heptathlon	Svetla Dimitrova; Bulgaria	6041	Marina Shcherbina; Soviet Union	5953	Anke Schmidt; East Germany	5900
WR world record | AR area record | CR championship record | GR games record | NR national record | OR Olympic record | PB personal best | SB season best | WL world leading (in a given season)

== Medal table ==
Rank	Nation	Gold	Silver	Bronze	Total
1	East Germany	8	4	7	19
2	Soviet Union	6	6	7	19
3	United States	5	5	2	12
4	Kenya	4	4	1	9
5	Great Britain	3	3	2	8
6	Cuba	3	3	1	7
7	Bulgaria (BUL)	2	2	2	6
8	Romania (ROM)	2	1	2	5
9	Nigeria	2	1	1	4
10	West Germany	1	2	2	5
11	Australia	1	1	1	3
11	Spain	1	1	1	3
13	China	1	0	3	4
14	Ethiopia (ETH)	1	0	2	3
15	Finland	1	0	0	1
16	Czechoslovakia	0	2	0	2
16	Tanzania	0	2	0	2
18	Canada	0	1	0	1
18	Chile	0	1	0	1
18	Italy	0	1	0	1
18	Japan	0	1	0	1
22	Jamaica	0	0	2	2
23	Belgium	0	0	1	1
23	France	0	0	1	1
23	New Zealand	0	0	1	1
23	Poland	0	0	1	1
23	Yugoslavia	0	0	1	1
Totals (27 entries)		41	41	41	123

== Participation ==
According to an unofficial count through an unofficial result list, 1135 athletes from 142 countries participated in the event. This is in agreement with the official numbers as published.

- Afghanistan (1)
- Albania (2)
- Algeria (5)
- Angola (2)
- Anguilla (1)
- Antigua and Barbuda (3)
- Argentina (4)
- Australia (40)
- Austria (15)
- Bahamas (5)
- Bahrain (3)
- Bangladesh (1)
- Barbados (4)
- Belgium (9)
- Belize (1)
- Bermuda (2)
- Bolivia (3)
- Botswana (2)
- Brazil (8)
- British Virgin Islands (2)
- Bulgaria (24)
- Burkina Faso (1)
- Cambodia (1)
- Cameroon (2)
- Canada (65)
- Cayman Islands (1)
- Chad (1)
- Chile (5)
- China (8)
- Chinese Taipei (3)
- Colombia (6)
- Comoros (1)
- Congo (2)
- Cook Islands (1)
- Costa Rica (2)
- Côte d'Ivoire (4)
- Cuba (27)
- Cyprus (7)
- Czechoslovakia (15)
- Denmark (4)
- Djibouti (4)
- Dominican Republic (5)
- East Germany (41)
- Ecuador (3)
- Egypt (7)
- El Salvador (2)
- Ethiopia (8)
- Fiji (1)
- Finland (14)
- France (30)
- Gambia (3)
- Ghana (5)
- Gibraltar (1)
- Great Britain (38)
- Greece (41)
- Grenada (1)
- Guatemala (2)
- Guinea (1)
- Guyana (3)
- Hong Kong (2)
- Hungary (19)
- Iceland (4)
- India (11)
- Indonesia (6)
- Iraq (1)
- Ireland (1)
- Israel (5)
- Italy (35)
- Jamaica (9)
- Japan (28)
- Kenya (12)
- Kuwait (3)
- Lebanon (3)
- Lesotho (3)
- Liberia (1)
- Liechtenstein (1)
- Madagascar (2)
- Malawi (1)
- Malaysia (2)
- Malta (2)
- Mauritania (1)
- Mauritius (4)
- Mexico (8)
- Montserrat (1)
- Morocco (6)
- Nauru (1)
- Nepal (1)
- Netherlands (8)
- Netherlands Antilles (1)
- New Zealand (11)
- Nicaragua (2)
- Nigeria (20)
- North Yemen (2)
- Norway (8)
- Oman (1)
- Pakistan (2)
- Palestine (3)
- Panama (3)
- Papua New Guinea (2)
- Paraguay (3)
- Peru (3)
- Philippines (2)
- Poland (23)
- Portugal (8)
- Puerto Rico (6)
- Romania (18)
- Saint Kitts and Nevis (1)
- Saint Lucia (2)
- Saint Vincent and the Grenadines (1)
- San Marino (2)
- Saudi Arabia (8)
- Senegal (4)
- Seychelles (3)
- Sierra Leone (2)
- Singapore (4)
- Somalia (2)
- South Korea (3)
- South Yemen (1)
- Soviet Union (69)
- Spain (30)
- Sri Lanka (1)
- Sudan (3)
- Suriname (1)
- Swaziland (3)
- Sweden (19)
- Switzerland (5)
- Tanzania (3)
- Thailand (5)
- Togo (1)
- Trinidad and Tobago (5)
- Tunisia (4)
- United Arab Emirates (6)
- United States (75)
- Uruguay (3)
- U.S. Virgin Islands (1)
- Vanuatu (1)
- Venezuela (3)
- West Germany (42)
- Yugoslavia (15)
- Zaire (1)
- Zambia (2)
- Zimbabwe (2)

== See also ==
- 1986 in athletics (track and field)
