= Elsa Devassoigne =

French sprinter (born 1969)

Personal information
- Born: 12 October 1969 (age 57) Schœlcher, Martinique
- Spouse: Roger Black (div. 2001)
- Children: Isabelle Black Valentin Meyer

Elsa Devassoigne (born 12 October 1969) is a retired French sprinter who specialized in the 200 and 400 metres.

She was born in Schœlcher, Martinique and represented the club CS Fontainebleau. As a junior, she won a bronze medal in the 4 x 100 metres relay at the 1987 European Junior Championships, together with Anne Leseur, Cécile Peyre and Odiah Sidibé. The next year she finished eighth in the 4 x 400 metres relay at the 1988 World Junior Championships.

In relays as a senior she finished fifth at the 1991 World Indoor Championships, sixth at the 1993 World Championships, eighth at the 1996 Olympic Games and second at the 1997 Mediterranean Games.

In the individual distance she won the 1993 Mediterranean Games. She also competed at the 1992 Olympic Games and the 1993 World Championships without reaching the final.

She became French 400 metres champion in 1992 and 1996. Her personal best time was 51.75 seconds, achieved in 1992.

Isabelle Black, her daughter with British runner Roger Black, is also a French international sprinter. Valentin Meyer her son
