= Mitchell Peters (athlete) =

United States Virgin Islands sprinter (born 1970)

Personal information
- Born: March 4, 1970 (age 56) St. Croix, US Virgin Islands

Sport
- Country: United States Virgin Islands
- Sport: Athletics
- Events: 100 metres 200 metres 400 metres

Mitchell Llewellyn "Mitch" Peters (born 4 March 1970) is a former Virgin Islander sprinter. He was born on St. Croix, U.S. Virgin Islands. Peters was recognized for his talents at an early age winning races at sports days and setting new meet records. He started competing and traveling regularly with his junior high and high school teams to places such as Puerto Rico, other Caribbean Islands, and United States to compete.

== Junior Competition Results ==
Year	Competition	Venue	Position	Event	Notes
Representing United States Virgin Islands
1987	1987 Pan American Games	Indianapolis, Indiana	19th	400 m	50.60
1988	Central American and Caribbean Junior Championships	Nassau, Bahamas			
1988	1988 World Junior Championships in Athletics	Sudbury, Canada	h1 r1/6	100 m	10.99
1988	1988 World Junior Championships in Athletics	Sudbury, Canada	h2 r1/7	400 m	50.17
1989	1989 CARIFTA Games	Bridgetown, Barbados	Final 5th	400m	49.30
1989	1989 CARIFTA Games	Bridgetown, Barbados	Final 4th	4x100m	42.1
1989	1989 CARIFTA Games	Bridgetown, Barbados	Final 4th	4x400m	3:27.0
1989	1989 CARIFTA Games	Bridgetown, Barbados	semi-final	200m	22.1

Collegiate Career Collegiately, Peters ran for Alabama A&M. He accepted an academic and athletic scholarship to attend Alabama A&M in 1988. During his time at Alabama A&M University Peters competed in both the short and long sprints and multiple relays. As a sprinter he had pretty good range from the 100m to the 800m. Peters made his mark in the record books for multiple events, a two-time NCAA All American, and a member of two SIAC Championships teams. In 1992 he graduated with a Bachelor of Science degree in Finance. Peters was inducted into the Alabama A&M University Hall of Fame in 2012.

== Collegiate Conference Results ==
Year	Competition	Venue	Position	Event	Notes
Representing
1990 Championships	Southern Intercollegiate Athletic Conference	Albany, Georgia	2nd	400m	47.95
1990 Championships	Southern Intercollegiate Athletic Conference	Albany, Georgia	8th	100m	
1990 Championships	Southern Intercollegiate Athletic Conference	Albany, Georgia	3rd	4x100m	
1990 Championships	Southern Intercollegiate Athletic Conference	Albany, Georgia	1st	4x400m	
1991 Championships	Southern Intercollegiate Athletic Conference	Huntsville, Alabama	2nd	400m	48.50
1991 Championships	Southern Intercollegiate Athletic Conference	Huntsville, Alabama	8th	100m	
1991 Championships	Southern Intercollegiate Athletic Conference	Huntsville, Alabama	3rd	4x100m	
1991 Championships	Southern Intercollegiate Athletic Conference	Huntsville, Alabama	2nd	4x400m	
1992 Championships	Southern Intercollegiate Athletic Conference	Albany, Georgia	1st	100m	10.55
1992 Championships	Southern Intercollegiate Athletic Conference	Albany, Georgia	3rd	200m	
1992 Championships	Southern Intercollegiate Athletic Conference	Albany, Georgia	2nd	4x100m	
1992 Championships	Southern Intercollegiate Athletic Conference	Albany, Georgia	1st	4x400m	
1992	NCAA Division II Men's Outdoor Track and Field Championships	San Angelo, TX	4th	4x100m	40.51
1994 Championships	Southern Intercollegiate Athletic Conference	Albany, Georgia	1st	4x100m	40.10
1994 Championships	Southern Intercollegiate Athletic Conference	Albany, Georgia	1st	4x400m	3:10.82
1994	NCAA Division II Men's Outdoor Track and Field Championships	Raleigh, NC	3rd	4x100m	40.41

== Olympic Competition Results ==
Year	Competition	Venue	Position	Event	Notes
Representing United States Virgin Islands
1992	1992 Olympic Games	Barcelona, Spain	h3 r1/5	4x100m	40.48
1996	1996 Olympic Games	Atlanta, Georgia	h5 r1/8	100m	11.12

After his collegiate season, at the 1992 Summer Olympics in Barcelona, Spain Peters ran for the US Virgin Islands men's 4 × 100 relay team; the team placed fifth in heat three of round one with a time 40.48, the team did not advance. Peters later competed in the men's 100m competition at the 1996 Summer Olympics in Atlanta, Georgia. He competed in the 100m. He recorded an 11.12, not enough to qualify for the next round past the heats.

== Recognition ==
- Athletic Booster Club - Outstanding Achievement Award
- City of Huntsville, Alabama - Resolution No. 96-791
- Resolution of the Madison County Commission
- 2012 Alabama A&M University Hall of Fame [https://aamusports.com/honors/hall-of-fame/mitchell-peters/193
- 2019 US Virgin Islands Track & Field Federation Hall of Fame [https://stthomassource.com/content/2019/02/16/vitff-hall-of-fame-announces-its-first-class-in-recognition-of-its-55th-anniversary
