= Tito Sawe =

Kenyan sprinter

Personal information
- Nationality: Kenyan
- Born: 10 July 1960
- Died: 23 February 2002 (aged 41)

Sport
- Sport: Sprinting
- Event: 4 × 400 metres relay
Medal record
Men's athletics
Representing Kenya
African Championships
Gold medal – first place	1985 Cairo	4×400 m
Bronze medal – third place	1984 Rabat	4×400 m

Tito Sawe (10 July 1960 – 23 February 2002) was a Kenyan sprinter. He competed in the men's 4 × 400 metres relay at the 1988 Summer Olympics.
