= Isabelle Black =

French sprinter (born 2000)

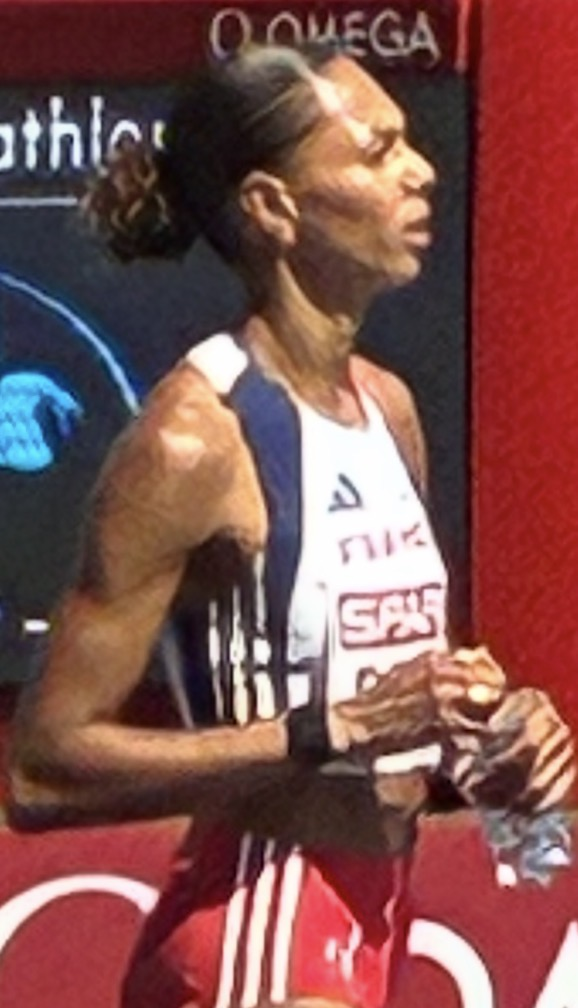
- Black in 2026

Personal information
- Nationality: French
- Born: 8 February 2000 (age 26) Guildford, England
- Height: 176 cm (5 ft 9 in)
- Weight: 57 kg (126 lb)

Sport
- Country: France
- Sport: Athletics
- Events: Sprint, Hurdles

Achievements and titles
- Personal bests: 200m: 23.30 (2026); 400m: 50.47 (2026)

Isabelle Black (born 8 February 2000) is a French sprinter. She competed at the 2025 World Athletics Championships and won the 400 metres at the 2026 French Athletics Championships and the 200 metres at the 2026 French Indoor Championships. She is the daughter of British sprinter Roger Black and French sprinter Elsa Devassoigne.

== Biography ==
Black started competing in athletics seriously in 2019 and is a Montpellier Athletic Méditerranée Métropole athlete. She won her first national under-23 title in July 2022 when she became the French U23 champion in the 400 metres in Albi, running personal best times in the heat and in the final, where she won with a time of 54.14 seconds.

Black ran 51.94 seconds for the 400 metres to win the Championnats d'Île-de-France Elites race in July 2025 in Thonon-les-Bains. She placed fourth in the 400 metres at the senior French Athletics Championships in August 2025, running a time of 52.39 seconds in Talence. She was selected for the French team for the 2025 World Athletics Championships in Tokyo, Japan, running the third leg as part of the French women's 4 x 400 metres team qualified for the final.

Competing indoors in 2026, Black won the 200 metres national title at the 2026 French Indoor Athletics Championships, running 23.30 seconds in the final. In May, she ran at the 2026 World Athletics Relays in the women's 4 × 400 metres relay in Gaborone, Botswana. Later that month, she moved to seventh on the French all-time list for the 400 metres, running 51.34 seconds in Brussels. At the Meeting International de Forbach in France later that month, she won the 400 metres in 51.38 seconds. Black ran a personal best 51.15 seconds competing in the Diamond League over 400 metres on 28 June at the 2026 Meeting de Paris. On 24 July, Black ran a new personal best of 50.47 seconds in the heats of the French Championships, moving to third on the French all-time 400 metres list. The following day, she returned to win the final in 50.58 seconds. Competing at the 2026 European Athletics Championships in Birmingham, England, in August, she was a semi-finalist in the 400 metres. She also competed in the women's 4 × 400 metres relay at the championships as France placed fifth in the final.

== Personal life ==
She was born in Guildford, United Kingdom, and is the daughter of British sprinter Roger Black and French sprinter Elsa Devassoigne.
