= Roberto Hernández (sprinter) =

Cuban sprinter (1967–2021)

Personal information
- Born: 6 March 1967 Limonar, Matanzas Province, Cuba
- Died: 5 July 2021 (aged 54) Havana, Cuba

Sport
- Sport: Track and field
Medal record
Representing Cuba
Olympic Games
Silver medal – second place	1992 Barcelona	4x400 m relay
Summer Universiade
Gold medal – first place	1985 Kobe	4x400m relay
Gold medal – first place	1989 Duisburg	400m
Silver medal – second place	1985 Kobe	400m
Pan American Games
Gold medal – first place	1991 Havana	400m
Gold medal – first place	1991 Havana	4x400m relay
Bronze medal – third place	1987 Indianapolis	400m
Central American and Caribbean Games
Gold medal – first place	1990 Mexico City	200m
Gold medal – first place	1990 Mexico City	400m
Bronze medal – third place	1990 Mexico City	4x400m relay
World Championships
Bronze medal – third place	1987 Rome	4x400m relay
World Indoor Championships
Silver medal – second place	1987 Indianapolis	400m
World Junior Championships
Silver medal – second place	1986 Athens	400m
Silver medal – second place	1986 Athens	4x400m relay

Roberto Hernández Prendes (6 March 1967 – 5 July 2021) was a Cuban track and field sprinter who specialized in the 400 metres. He was born in Limonar, Matanzas. His personal best for the 400 metres is 44.14 seconds, set in Seville, Spain in May 1990. Until September 2006, this was the fastest time by anyone not from the US. It remains the Cuban record for the event. He broke 44.5 seconds on four other occasions.

Hernandez finished fourth in the World Championship finals in 1987 and 1991. As a member of the Cuban 4 × 400 m relay squad he won a World Championship Bronze medal in 1987 and an Olympic silver medal in 1992. As of 1 October 2014, Hernandez holds the fastest non-winning time for the 300 metres.

== International competitions ==
Year	Competition	Venue	Position	Event	Notes
Representing Cuba
1985	Central American and Caribbean Championships	Nassau, Bahamas	1st	400 m	45.34
1985	Summer Universiade	Kobe, Japan	2nd	400 m	45.41
1985	Summer Universiade	Kobe, Japan	1st	4 × 400 m relay	3:02.20
1985	World Cup	Canberra, Australia	6th	4 × 400 m relay	3:03.52^{1}
1986	Central American and Caribbean; Junior Championships (U-20)	Mexico City, Mexico	1st	200 m	20.70 A
1986	Central American and Caribbean; Junior Championships (U-20)	Mexico City, Mexico	1st	400 m	45.19 A
1986	Ibero American Championships	Havana, Cuba	2nd	400 m	46.03
1986	Ibero American Championships	Havana, Cuba	2nd	4 × 400 m relay	3:09.09
1986	Pan American Junior Championships	Winter Park, United States	1st	200 m	20.83
1986	Pan American Junior Championships	Winter Park, United States	1st	400 m	45.64
1986	Pan American Junior Championships	Winter Park, United States	2nd	4 × 100 m relay	40.62
1986	Pan American Junior Championships	Winter Park, United States	1st	4 × 400 m relay	3:04.30
1986	World Junior Championships	Athens, Greece	2nd (h)	200m	21.20 (+0.3 m/s)
1986	World Junior Championships	Athens, Greece	2nd	400m	45.64
1986	World Junior Championships	Athens, Greece	2nd	4 × 400 m relay	3:04.22
1987	World Indoor Championships	Indianapolis, United States	2nd	400 m	46.09
1987	Pan American Games	Indianapolis, United States	3rd	400 m	45.13
1987	World Championships	Rome, Italy	4th	400 m	44.99
1987	World Championships	Rome, Italy	3rd	4 × 400 m	2:59.16 NR
1988	Ibero-American Championships	Mexico City, Mexico	3rd	200m	20.24 (-0.3 m/s) A
1988	Ibero-American Championships	Mexico City, Mexico	1st	400m	44.44 A
1988	Ibero-American Championships	Mexico City, Mexico	1st	4 × 400 m relay	2:59.71 A CR
1989	Central American and Caribbean Championships	San Juan, Puerto Rico	1st	400 m	44.84 CR
1989	Central American and Caribbean Championships	San Juan, Puerto Rico	1st	4 × 400 m relay	3:04.90
1989	Universiade	Duisburg, West Germany	1st	400 m	45.42
1989	World Cup	Barcelona, Spain	1st	400 m	44.58
1989	World Cup	Barcelona, Spain	1st	4 × 400 m relay	3:00.65
1990	Goodwill Games	Seattle, United States	1st	400 m	44.79
1990	Goodwill Games	Seattle, United States	3rd	4 × 400 m	3:03.35
1990	Central American and Caribbean Games	Mexico City, Mexico	1st	200 m	20.72 A (-0.8 m/s)
1990	Central American and Caribbean Games	Mexico City, Mexico	1st	400 m	44.84 A
1990	Central American and Caribbean Games	Mexico City, Mexico	3rd	4 × 400 m	3:06.17 A
1991	Pan American Games	Havana, Cuba	7th	200 m	23.22
1991	Pan American Games	Havana, Cuba	1st	400 m	44.52
1991	Pan American Games	Havana, Cuba	1st	4 × 400 m	3:01.93
1991	World Championships	Tokyo, Japan	4th	400 m	44.86
1992	Ibero-American Championships	Seville, Spain	1st (h)	400m	46.37
1992	Ibero-American Championships	Seville, Spain	1st	4 × 400 m relay	3:01.58
1992	Olympic Games	Barcelona, Spain	5th	400 m	44.52
1992	Olympic Games	Barcelona, Spain	2nd	4 × 400 m	2:59.51
1993	World Championships	Stuttgart, Germany	heats	400 m	46.01
1993	World Championships	Stuttgart, Germany	6th	4 × 400 m	3:00.46
1994	Ibero-American Championships	Mar del Plata, Argentina	—	4 × 400 m relay	DQ
1996	Ibero American Championships	Medellín, Colombia	5th	400 m	46.95
1996	Ibero American Championships	Medellín, Colombia	1st	4 × 400 m	3:03.98
1996	Olympic Games	Atlanta, United States	19th (h)	4 × 400 m	3:05.75

^{1}Representing the Americas
