= Tamás Molnár (powerlifter) =

Hungarian powerlifter

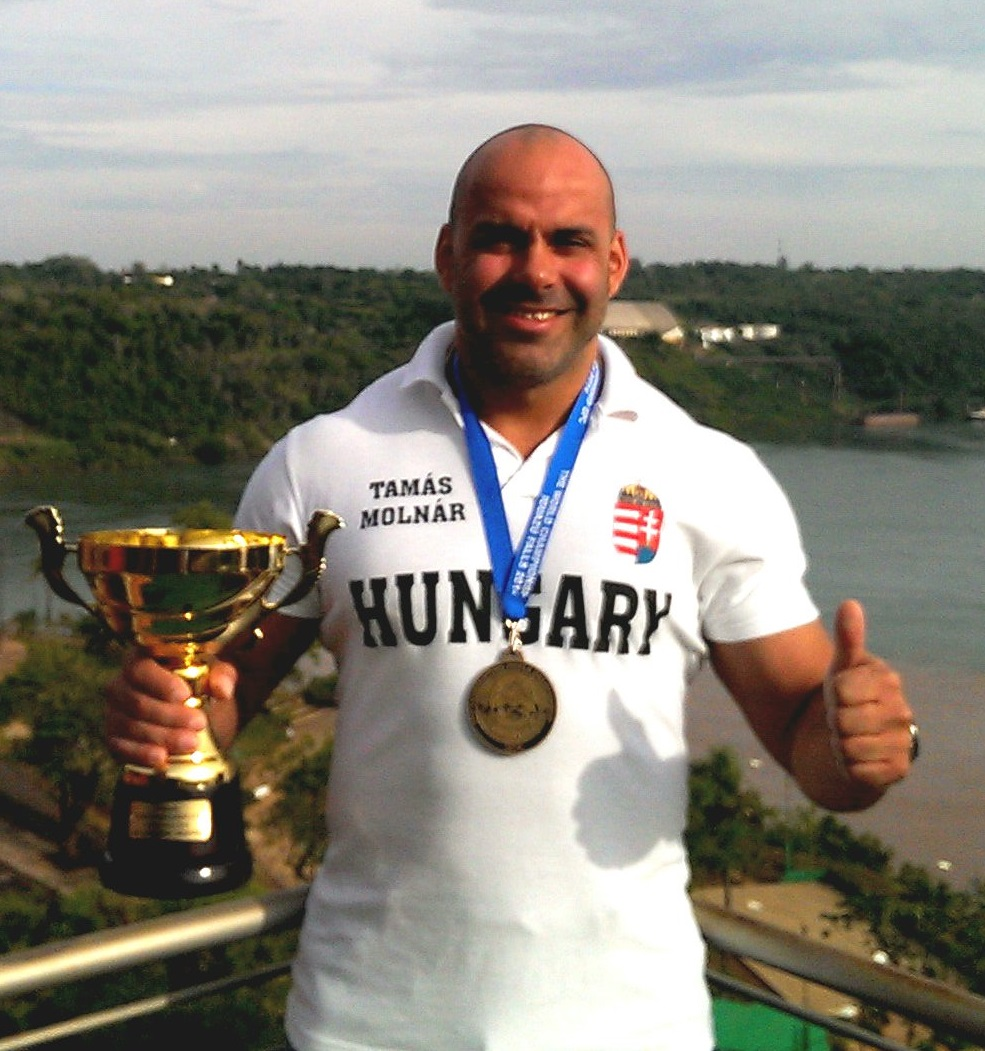
- Born: 5 June 1975 (age 50); Mosonmagyaróvár, Hungary
- Occupation: powerlifter athlete

Tamás Molnár (born 5 June 1975) is a powerlifter and world champion. From 1997, he joined the junior and senior national team, and topped national records several times in deadlift. From 2012, he is a professional sportsman and in 2014, he garnered the first place in Argentina at the GPC World Championship (absolute winner).

== Biography ==
He was born in Mosonmagyaróvár, Hungary, to Sándor Molnár (father) and Gizella Nemes (mother), both teachers. After graduating high-school in 1995 in the Kossuth Lajos High-school of Mosonmagyaróvár, he obtained a college degree in cultural management from the NYME Apáczai Csere János Teacher Training College. He started to train in weightlifting at the age of 15 to compensate for his thinner than average build; within a year, it became evident he was stronger than most of his training colleagues in squatting. This inspired him to try powerlifting.

== Sports career ==
His participated in his first competition in 1993 at the county squat and bench press championship in Sopron, Hungary (3rd place in the 82.5 kg category; squat, 147.5 kg); afterwards he pursued training under the supervision of multiple powerlifting champion József Horváth and in 1995, he won a junior national champion titlein the 90 kg weight category. After his first national record in 1997, he joined the junior and senior national team and then another weight category (100 kg). In 1998, he won the senior national champion title and 5th place at the junior world championship (822.5 kg combined total).

In 2000, at the Danube Cup in Banovce, Slovakia, he was an absolute winner (832.5 kg, combined total), raising the national and Danube Cup records in deadlift to 332.5 kg, a performance unparalleled ever since. He participated in his last amateur competition in 2003, winning 6th place at the senior national championship.

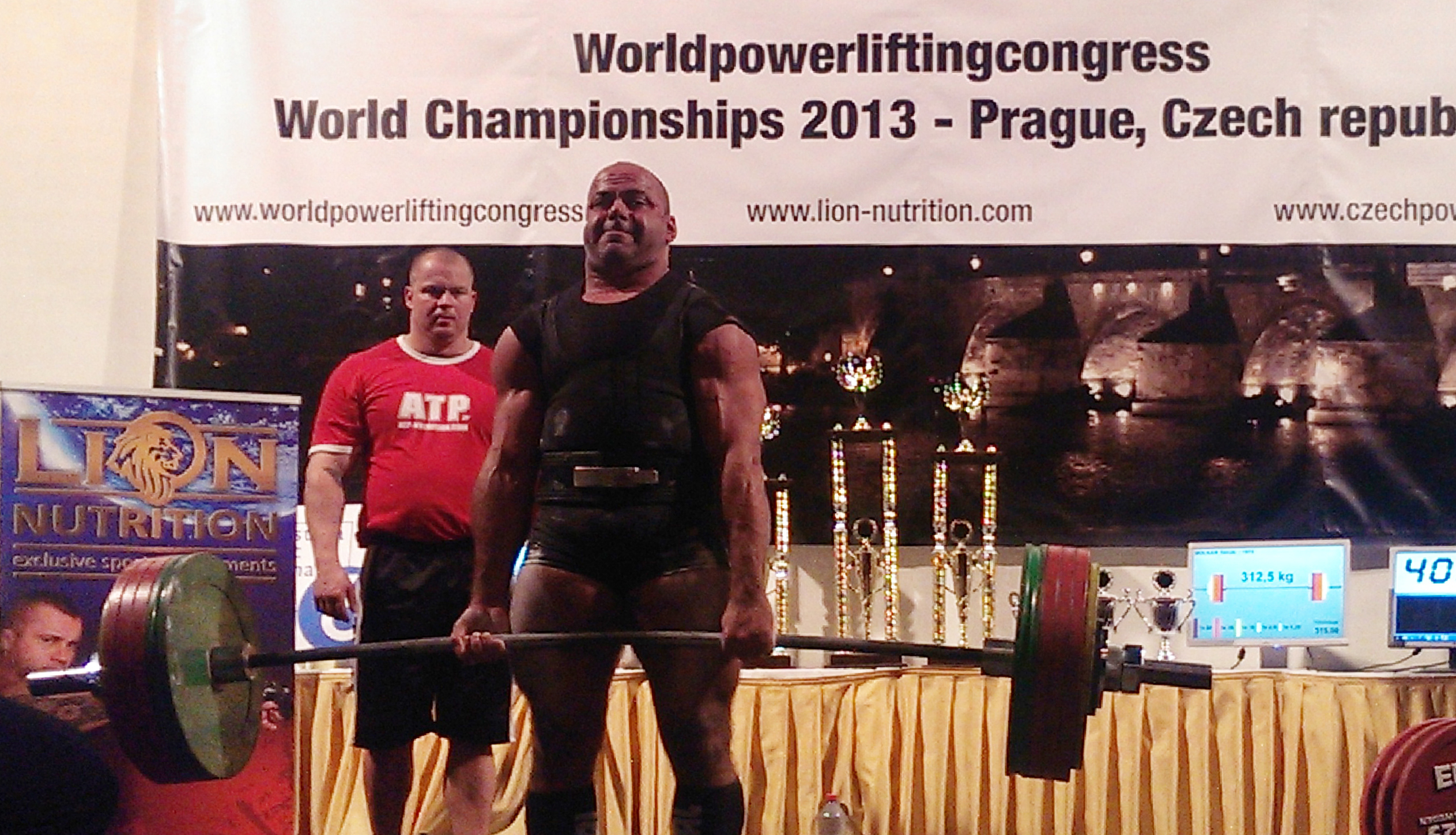
WPC World Championships 2013 Prague

Following a break of ten years, he started his career as a professional sportsman (2012) in deadlift (trainer: Sándor Freimann). After preparing for 8 weeks, he won first place in his weight category at the Atlasz Deadlift Gala in Balassagyarmat, Hungary (280 kg, RAW category). More success followed: European Champion (WPC EB, Portugal, 2013); world champion (WPC World Championship, Prague, 2013). In 2014, he topped his own results and became absolute winner in deadlift at the Scitec RAW Cup of Budapest, Hungary (320 kg, deadlift).

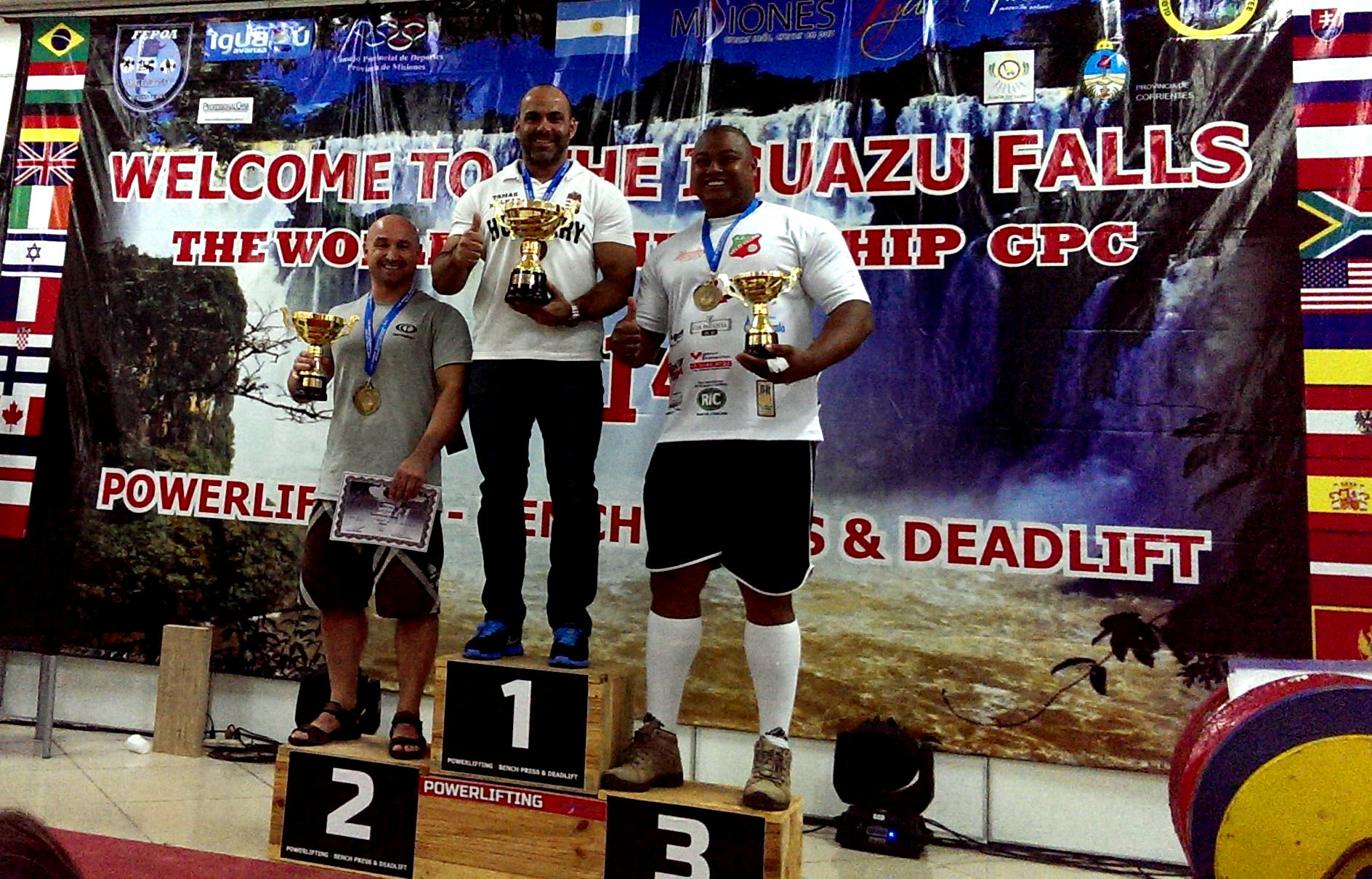
GPC World Championships, 2013 Argentina, Iguazu Falls

He obtained the best results of his professional career at the GPC European Championship in Trutnov, Czech Republic: with a deadlift of 327.5 kg, he won first place in the absolute category. The next milestone was the GPC World Championship (Iguazu Falls, Argentina, 2014), where he became absolute world champion in the RAW category. Currently he is taking a longer leave from competitions, to rest.

== Awards ==
Sportsman of the Year 2014 – Mosonmagyaróvár, Hungary

== Private life ==
He has one daughter, Evelin (2002)

== Hobby ==
Weightlifting is not only a competitive sport for him, but his main hobby and lifestyle.

== IPF – Amateur career ==
1995.

- Adult Hungarian Championship, Gyula, powerlifting (90 kg)- 630 kg, 5th place
- Junior Hungarian Championship, Budapest, powerlifting (90 kg)- 650 kg, 1st place

1996.

- Adult Hungarian Championship, Dabas, powerlifting (90 kg)- 660 kg, 3rd place
- Junior Hungarian Championship, Orosháza, powerlifting (90 kg)- 670 kg, 2nd place

1997.

- Danube Cup, Banovce, Slovakia (90 kg)- 665 kg 1st place
- II. class Hungarian Championship, Székesfehérvár, powerlifting (90 kg)- 696 kg, 1st place
- Junior Hungarian Championship, Kaposvár, powerlifting (100 kg)- 680 kg, 1st place
- Junior European Championships, Pultusk, Poland, powerlifting (100 kg) - 687,5 kg, 5th place
- Junior World Championships, Bratislava, Slovakia, powerlifting (100 kg) - 760 kg, 6th place

1998.

- Danube Cup, Immenstadt, Germany, powerlifting (100 kg) - 750 kg, 2nd place
- Adult Hungarian Championship, Kaposvár, powerlifting (100 kg) - 781 kg, 1st place
- Junior Hungarian Championship, Esztergom, powerlifting (100 kg) - 802,5 kg, 1st place
- Junior World Championships, Győr, powerlifting (110 kg) - 822,5 kg, 5th place

1999.

- Adult Hungarian Championship, Kaposvár, powerlifting (100 kg) - 805 kg, 1st place

2000.

- Danube Cup, Banovce, Slovakia, powerlifting (100 kg) - 832,5 kg, 1st place
- Danube Cup, Banovce, Slovakia, powerlifting (absolute) - 832,5 kg, 1st place
- Adult Hungarian Championship, Szombathely, powerlifting (100 kg) - 832,5 kg, 1st place

2001.

- Adult Hungarian Championship, Tatabánya, powerlifting (100 kg) - 777,5 kg, 1st place

2002.

- Adult Hungarian Championship, Mosonmagyaróvár, powerlifting (100 kg) - 785 kg, 1st place

2003.

- Adult Hungarian Championship, Budapest, powerlifting (100 kg) - 777,5 kg, 1st place

== WPC-GPC – Professional career ==
2013.

- Hungarian-Szlovakian Powerlifting Championship, Abasár, Eq. deadlift (100 kg) - 305 kg, 1st place
- WPC European Championship, Vila Do Conde, Portugal, Eq. deadlift (100 kg) - 310 kg, 1st place
- BioTech USA–Fitbalance Deadlift Gala, Budapest, RAW deadlift (100 kg) - 315 kg, 1st place
- WPC World Championships, Prague, Czech Republic, RAW deadlift (100 kg) - 315 kg, 2nd place
- WPC World Championships, Prague, Czech Republic, Eq. deadlift (100 kg) - 312,5 kg, 1st place

2014.

- Scitec RAW Cup, Budapest, RAW deadlift (100 kg) - 320 kg, 1st place
- Scitec RAW Cup, Budapest, RAW deadlift (Absolute) - 320 kg, 1st place
- GPC European Championships, Trutnov, Czech Republic, Eq. deadlift (100 kg) - 327,5 kg, 1st hely
- GPC European Championships, Trutnov, Czech Republic, Eq. deadlift (Absolute) - 327,5 kg, 1st place
- WPC European Championships, Baku, Azerbaijan, RAW deadlift (100 kg) - 315 kg, 2nd place
- Scitec RAW Cup, Budapest, RAW deadlift (100 kg) - 317,5 kg, 1st place
- Scitec RAW Cup, Budapest, RAW deadlift (Absolute) - 317,5 kg, 1st place
- GPC World Championships, Iguazu Falls, Argentina, RAW deadlift (100 kg) - 315 kg, 1st place
- GPC World Championships, Iguazu Falls, Argentina, RAW deadlift (Absolute) - 315 kg, 1st place
- WPC World Cup, Bratislava, Slovakia, Eq. deadlift - 320 kg, 1st place
