= Lucas Sang =

Kenyan athletics competitor

Lucas Sang (12 February 1961 – 1 January 2008) was a Kenyan athlete who participated in the 1988 Summer Olympics, held in Seoul. He was a member of the Kenyan 4 x 400 metre relay team, reaching the final and finishing eighth. He also competed in the 400 metre individual race, but failed to make the semifinals.

Sang took part in the 1987 All Africa Games in Nairobi, the 1998 African Championships in Athletics and the 1989 IAAF World Cup. He then switched to the 800 metre event, but failed to make an impact due to competition from other Kenyan runners. He later became known as a pacesetter for both Kenyan and international athletes. He was part of the Kenyan Armed Forces athletics team.

After retiring, Sang became a farmer and had a large-scale farm in Moiben, in the Uasin Gishu District of Kenya. He was also a business partner of Moses Tanui, the former 10,000m World Champion. He was also involved with sports administration and, at the time of his death, was the chairman of the National Association of Kenyan Olympians (NAKO).

After initial reports that Sang was "hacked to death", it was rumored that he was attacked and killed by a stone-throwing gang in the town of Eldoret on New Year's Day 2008, while on the way to his home near Kabenes, during the violence gripping Kenya in the aftermath of the controversial December 2007 presidential elections. After being struck on the head by a rock, Sang's body was then burnt by the gang, which it is believed, mistook him for a member of a rival tribe. That is very unlikely though because he looked distinctly Kalenjin and he would surely have spoken the language.

Other reports say that Sang was killed by his Kikuyu neighbors as he led a group of Kalenjin men to attack them. This version was corroborated to ESPN by a Kikuyu man who was one of the attackers as well as a Kalenjin man who had been conscripted to join in the attack.
