= William Reed (sprinter, born 1970) =

Personal information
- Nationality: American
- Born: April 1, 1970 (age 56)
- Height: 6 ft 0 in (1.83 m)
- Weight: 170 lb (77 kg)

Sport
- Sport: Track and field
- Event(s): 200 metres, 400 metres

Achievements and titles
- Personal best(s): 200 m: 20.86 (Winter Park 1987); 400 m: 45.17 (Tucson 1987)
Medal record
Men's Athletics
Representing the United States
World Junior Championships
Gold medal – first place	1986 Athens	4×400 m relay
Pan American Junior Championships
Gold medal – first place	1986 Winter Park	4×100 m relay

William Reed (born April 1, 1970) is a former American sprinter. After a heralded prep career at Central High School in Philadelphia, Reed endeavored upon a prosperous career in hospitality. He holds world best for his age group in the 300m at U15 and U16 levels with 34.58 and 33.19 seconds indoor respectively.

In 1987, Reed set a World Best in the Youth ranks in the 400 metres.

Records
Preceded by (United States) Henry Thomas	Boys' World Youth Best Holder, 400 metres 20 June 1987 – 2 September 1995	Next: (United States) Obea Moore
