= Hiromi Kawasumi =

Japanese sprinter (born 1962)

Personal information
- Nationality: Japanese
- Born: 2 June 1962 (age 63)

Sport
- Sport: Sprinting
- Event: 4 × 400 metres relay

Hiromi Kawasumi (川角 博美, Kawasumi Hiromi; born 2 June 1962) is a Japanese sprinter. He competed in the men's 4 × 400 metres relay at the 1988 Summer Olympics.
