= Steve Lewis (sprinter) =

American track and field athlete

Personal information
- Full name: Steven Earl Lewis
- Nationality: American
- Born: May 16, 1969 (age 57) Los Angeles, California, U.S.
- Height: 6 ft 2 in (188 cm)
- Weight: 185 lb (84 kg)

Sport
- Country: United States
- Sport: Track
- Event: 400 metres
- College team: UCLA Bruins
- Club: Santa Monica Track Club
Medal record
Men's athletics
Representing the United States
Olympic Games
Gold medal – first place	1988 Seoul	400 metres
Gold medal – first place	1988 Seoul	4 × 400 metres relay
Gold medal – first place	1992 Barcelona	4 × 400 metres relay
Silver medal – second place	1992 Barcelona	400 metres

Steven Earl Lewis (born May 16, 1969) is a former American track and field athlete, winner of three gold medals at the 1988 Summer Olympics and 1992 Summer Olympics.

Born in Los Angeles, Steve Lewis took up track at with the Los Angeles Jets youth track club under the direction of Ronald Moore and later went to Banning High School. He transferred to American High School in Fremont, California, following his sophomore year, where he graduated in 1987. While at American he competed in track and field and still holds the Mission Valley Athletic League record in the 400 meters. He won the CIF California State Meet in 1986 and 1987. He would go on to attend UCLA. As a freshman at UCLA, Lewis had a spectacular year in 1988, when the precocious 19-year-old not only completely rewrote the world junior all-time list in the 400 m, but also proved his mettle in senior competition by winning the Olympic gold medal.

Lewis had not been a total unknown prior to 1988, having set a personal best of 45.76 at the 1987 USA national junior championships, but he caught many unawares when he won his quarter-final at the USA Olympic Trials with new world junior record of 44.61, and then slashed this time the following day, when he won his semi-final in 44.11. Despite this performance, Lewis could only finish third in the final in 44.37, having been well beaten by his older compatriots, Butch Reynolds and his UCLA teammate, Danny Everett.

In the Olympic Games at Seoul, Reynolds was the clear favorite to win the gold medal, and few people took Lewis' chances seriously, but in the Olympic final Lewis set a fast pace in the early stages while Reynolds held back. Although Reynolds closed near the finish, Lewis held on to win in 43.87, still the United States, North American and World junior record. Steve won a second gold medal three days later, as a member of the victorious USA 4 × 400 m relay team which equalled the world record of 2:56.16 that had stood since the 1968 Olympics.

By the end of 1988, Lewis had run what still rank as 7 of the top ten junior 400 metre races of all time.

In 1990, he won NCAA Championships in the 400 m and went on to win the US Track and Field Championships in the same event.

In 1992, Lewis, once again, competed at the Olympic Games in Barcelona and won a silver medal in the 400 m and a gold medal in the 4 × 400 m relay, which broke the world record (2:55.74) that Lewis had previously helped tie in the 1988 Olympic Games.

The rest of Lewis' career was affected by injury and an ongoing viral illness, and he never again competed at a major international championships.

Lewis was inducted into the UCLA Athletics Hall of Fame in 2004. In 2019, he was inducted into the National Track and Field Hall of Fame.

== Personal bests ==
As of May 26, 2024

Event	Time (seconds)	Place	Date
100 meters	10.41 (+0.5 m/s)	Irvine	April 24, 1992
200 meters	20.58	San Jose	May 30, 1992
300 meters	31.82	Gateshead	July 17, 1992
400 meters	43.87	Seoul	September 28, 1988

Records
Preceded by (United States) Darrell Robinson	Men's World Junior Record Holder, 400 metres May 22, 1988 – present	Incumbent
