= Andrew Valmon =

American former 400 metre runner (born 1965)

Personal information
- Full name: Andrew Orlando Valmon
- Born: January 1, 1965 (age 61) Brooklyn, New York, U.S.
Medal record
Men's athletics
Representing the United States
Olympic Games
Gold medal – first place	1988 Seoul	4 × 400 m relay
Gold medal – first place	1992 Barcelona	4 × 400 m relay
World Championships
Gold medal – first place	1993 Stuttgart	4 × 400 m relay
Silver medal – second place	1991 Tokyo	4 × 400 m relay

Andrew Orlando Valmon (born January 1, 1965) is an American former 400 meter runner, two-time Olympic gold medalist, and two-time World Athletics Championships medalist.

Valmon was born in Brooklyn, New York, and raised in Manchester Township, New Jersey, where he attended Manchester Township High School. He attended college at Seton Hall University and graduated in 1987 with a degree in communications.

Valmon won the silver medal at the World Indoor Athletics Championships in 1991 in Seville. In 1992 he won a gold medal with the American 4 × 400 m relay team at the Olympic Games in Barcelona. The same year, Valmon set his personal best of 44.28 seconds.

He is now the Track and field Head Coach at the University of Maryland, College Park, and coaches a summer camp at the university. He is married to Meredith Rainey, who is also an Olympic runner. Valmon is a member of the Phi Beta Sigma fraternity.

== Collegiate Coaching ==
From 1995 to 1999 Valmon was an assistant track coach at Georgetown University. and then Head Coach from 1999 to 2003.

Immediately following that season he became the head coach of the track and field program at the University of Maryland, College Park. As of November 2025, 65 student-athletes have been named USTFCCCA All-Academic performers due to their athletic performances. Maryland track and field athletes consistently rank among the top of their peers with the cross country program earning the school's award for the highest team GPA three years in a row, in 2013, 2014, and 2015.

== 2012 London Olympics ==
On February 11, 2011, Valmon was named U.S. track and field head coach for 2012 London Olympics. Under his leadership Team USA won 29 medals at that year's games including ten golds, contributing to the second highest medal count in history
