= Carl Folkes =

Canadian sprinter

Personal information
- Nationality: Canadian
- Born: 13 February 1968 (age 57) Saint Catherine Parish, Jamaica

Sport
- Sport: Sprinting
- Event: 4 × 400 metres relay

Carl Folkes (born 13 February 1968) is a Canadian sprinter. He competed in the men's 4 × 400 metres relay at the 1988 Summer Olympics.
