= Bodo Kuhn =

German sprinter

Personal information
- Nationality: German
- Born: 9 August 1967 (age 58) Miltenberg, West Germany

Sport
- Sport: Sprinting
- Event: 4 × 400 metres relay

Bodo Kuhn
Medal record

Men's Athletics

Representing West Germany

Olympic Games
Bronze medal – third place	1988 Seoul	4 × 400 m relay

Bodo Kuhn (born 9 August 1967) is a German sprinter. He competed in the men's 4 × 400 metres relay at the 1988 Summer Olympics, representing West Germany.
