= Edgar Itt =

German sprinter (born 1967)

Personal information
- Born: 8 June 1967 (age 59) Gedern, West Germany
- Height: 1.86 m (6 ft 1 in)
- Weight: 75 kg (165 lb)

Sport
- Sport: Sprint running
- Club: TV Gelnhausen
- Coached by: Harald Schmid
Medal record
Men's athletics
Representing West Germany
Olympic Games
Bronze medal – third place	1988 Seoul	4×400 m relay
European Championships
Silver medal – second place	1986 Stuttgart	4×400 m relay
Silver medal – second place	1990 Split	4×400 m relay
Summer Universiade
Bronze medal – third place	1989 Duisburg	4x400 m relay

Edgar Itt (born 8 June 1967) is a retired West German athlete. He competed at the 1988 Summer Olympics in the 4 × 400 m relay and individual 400 m hurdles; he won a bronze medal in the relay and finished eighth in the 400 m hurdles. Itt also won two European silver medals in the 4 × 400 m relay in 1986 and 1990.

Itt was born to an African father, whom he never met. He graduated in business administration from the University of Frankfurt. Since 2000 he works as a motivation coach with businesspeople. In 2012 he was also involved with the German Olympic team as a psychologist. In December 2013 he married the musician and actress Ariane Roth.
