= Howard Davis (sprinter) =

Jamaican sprinter (born 1967)

Personal information
- Born: 27 April 1967 (age 59)

Sport
- Sport: Track and field
Medal record
Representing Jamaica
Olympic Games
Silver medal – second place	1988 Seoul	4 x 400 m relay
Summer Universiade
Gold medal – first place	1989 Duisburg	4 x 400 m relay
Silver medal – second place	1991 Sheffield	4 x 400 m relay
CARIFTA Games Junior (U20)
Gold medal – first place	1986 Les Abymes	400 m

Howard Davis (born 27 April 1967) is a Jamaican former athlete who competed mainly in the 400 metres.

He competed for Jamaica in the 1988 Summer Olympics held in Seoul, South Korea in the 4 x 400 metre relay where he won the silver medal with his teammates Devon Morris, Winthrop Graham and Bertland Cameron.

Running for the Texas A&M Aggies track and field program, Davis anchored the winning 1989 4 × 400 meter relay at the NCAA Division I Outdoor Track and Field Championships.
