= Miles Murphy =

Australian sprinter

Miles Murphy (born 19 May 1967) is an Australian former sprinter who competed in the 1988 Summer Olympics. At the 1986 Commonwealth Games he won a silver medal in the 4 x 400 metres relay.

He became chief executive officer of the Australian Paralympic Committee in December 2008. He left the role in January 2010.
