= Athletics at the 1990 Commonwealth Games – Men's 200 metres =

Men's 200 metres at the Commonwealth Games

The men's 200 metres event at the 1990 Commonwealth Games was held on 29 January and 1 February at the Mount Smart Stadium in Auckland.

== Medalists ==
Gold	Silver	Bronze
Marcus Adam; England	John Regis; England	Ade Mafe; England

== Results ==
=== Heats ===
Qualification: First 5 of each heat (Q) and the next 6 fastest (q) qualified for the quarterfinals.

Wind:
Heat 1: ?, Heat 2: +2.3 m/s, Heat 3: +2.5 m/s, Heat 4: ?, Heat 5: ?, Heat 6: +4.8 m/s

Rank	Heat	Name	Nationality	Time	Notes
1	3	Neil de Silva	Trinidad and Tobago	20.76	Q
2	2	Paul Greene	Australia	20.79	Q
2	3	Samuel Boateng	Ghana	20.79	Q
4	1	John Regis	England	20.80	Q
5	1	Dale McClunie	New Zealand	20.81	Q
6	5	Ade Mafe	England	20.98	Q
7	6	Marcus Adam	England	21.00	Q
8	4	Abdullahi Tetengi	Nigeria	21.01	Q
9	2	Kennedy Ondiek	Kenya	21.08	Q
10	2	Davidson Ezinwa	Nigeria	21.10	Q
11	4	Clive Wright	Jamaica	21.21	Q
12	3	Tim Jackson	Australia	21.22	Q
13	3	Scott Bowden	New Zealand	21.25	Q
14	6	Darren Clark	Australia	21.29	Q
15	1	Joseph Gikonyo	Kenya	21.30	Q
16	6	Takale Tuna	Papua New Guinea	21.32	Q
17	2	Mark Woods	New Zealand	21.35	Q
18	1	Fabian Muyaba	Zimbabwe	21.42	Q
18	4	Edward Bitoga	Uganda	21.42	Q
20	3	Bertram Haynes	Saint Kitts and Nevis	21.45	Q
21	6	Mike Dwyer	Canada	21.52	Q
22	5	Troy Douglas	Bermuda	21.53	Q
23	1	Camera Ntereke	Botswana	21.57	Q
24	4	Dave Clark	Scotland	21.62	Q
25	5	Cyprian Enweani	Canada	21.63	Q
26	6	Duane Johnson	Guyana	21.72	Q
27	4	Pa Hali Jammeh	Gambia	21.78	Q
28	2	Gabriel Osei	Ghana	21.94	Q
29	6	David Teece	Isle of Man	21.95	q
30	5	Lindel Hodge	British Virgin Islands	21.99	Q
31	5	Shahanuddin Choudhury	Bangladesh	22.10	Q
32	5	Jayson Majase	Botswana	22.13	q
33	3	Esekiel Wartovo	Papua New Guinea	22.23	q
34	2	Peauope Suli	Tonga	22.29	q
35	2	Joseph Adam	Seychelles	22.31	q
36	4	Leung Wing Kwong	Hong Kong	22.35	q
37	4	Lamin Marikong	Gambia	22.37	
38	1	Mohamed Shah Alam	Bangladesh	22.49	
38	6	Muhammad Afzal Khan	Pakistan	22.49	
40	2	Percy Larame	Seychelles	22.51	
41	5	Emmanuel Mack	Papua New Guinea	22.62	
42	3	Victor Gamedze	Swaziland	22.78	
43	1	Mark Sherwin	Cook Islands	22.87	
44	1	Baptiste Firiam	Vanuatu	23.25	
45	3	Kuckrey Nakat	Vanuatu	23.56	
46	5	Alan Rua	Cook Islands	24.48	
	4	Alvin Daniel	Trinidad and Tobago	DNS	
	6	Jamie Henderson	Scotland	DNS	

=== Quarterfinals ===
Qualification: First 4 of each heat (Q) and the next 2 fastest (q) qualified for the semifinals.

Wind:
Heat 1: +3.2 m/s, Heat 2: +2.8 m/s, Heat 3: +3.4 m/s, Heat 4: +2.5 m/s

Rank	Heat	Name	Nationality	Time	Notes
1	4	Marcus Adam	England	20.35	Q
2	2	John Regis	England	20.40	Q
3	1	Ade Mafe	England	20.58	Q
3	3	Neil de Silva	Trinidad and Tobago	20.58	Q
5	2	Dale McClunie	New Zealand	20.61	Q
6	3	Kennedy Ondiek	Kenya	20.64	Q
7	3	Abdullahi Tetengi	Nigeria	20.74	Q
8	3	Cyprian Enweani	Canada	20.77	Q
9	4	Davidson Ezinwa	Nigeria	20.79	Q
10	4	Paul Greene	Australia	20.80	Q
11	1	Nelson Boateng	Ghana	20.83	Q
12	2	Mike Dwyer	Canada	20.85	Q
13	2	Tim Jackson	Australia	20.88	Q
14	1	Darren Clark	Australia	20.89	Q
15	2	Joseph Gikonyo	Kenya	20.98	q
16	3	Dave Clark	Scotland	21.01	q
17	4	Scott Bowden	New Zealand	21.09	Q
18	1	Clive Wright	Jamaica	21.12	Q
19	3	Mark Woods	New Zealand	21.18	
20	3	Takale Tuna	Papua New Guinea	21.20	
21	1	Troy Douglas	Bermuda	21.21	
22	2	Bertram Haynes	Saint Kitts and Nevis	21.34	
23	4	Edward Bitoga	Uganda	21.39	
24	4	Camera Ntereke	Botswana	21.53	
25	1	Pa Hali Jammeh	Gambia	21.67	
26	2	David Teece	Isle of Man	21.90	
27	3	Jayson Majase	Botswana	21.92	
28	1	Lindel Hodge	British Virgin Islands	21.94	
29	2	Leung Wing Kwong	Hong Kong	21.96	
30	2	Gabriel Osei	Ghana	21.97	
31	4	Esekiel Wartovo	Papua New Guinea	22.05	
32	1	Joseph Adam	Seychelles	22.17	
33	3	Peauope Suli	Tonga	22.25	
33	4	Shahanuddin Choudhury	Bangladesh	22.25	
	1	Fabian Muyaba	Zimbabwe	DQ	
	4	Duane Johnson	Guyana	DNF	

=== Semifinals ===
Qualification: First 4 of each heat (Q) and the next 1 fastest (q) qualified for the final.

Wind:
Heat 1: +2.5 m/s, Heat 2: +2.3 m/s

Rank	Heat	Name	Nationality	Time	Notes
1	1	Marcus Adam	England	20.33	Q
2	2	John Regis	England	20.35	Q
3	1	Davidson Ezinwa	Nigeria	20.38	Q
3	2	Kennedy Ondiek	Kenya	20.38	Q
5	2	Ade Mafe	England	20.42	Q
6	2	Abdullahi Tetengi	Nigeria	20.58	Q
7	2	Paul Greene	Australia	20.60	q
8	1	Neil de Silva	Trinidad and Tobago	20.66	Q
9	1	Cyprian Enweani	Canada	20.67	Q
10	2	Nelson Boateng	Ghana	20.72	
11	1	Dale McClunie	New Zealand	20.75	
12	1	Darren Clark	Australia	20.89	
13	1	Clive Wright	Jamaica	21.03	
14	2	Mike Dwyer	Canada	21.06	
15	1	Joseph Gikonyo	Kenya	21.34	
16	2	Scott Bowden	New Zealand	21.35	
	2	Dave Clark	Scotland	DNF	
	1	Tim Jackson	Australia	DNS	

=== Final ===
Wind: +2.4 m/s

Rank	Lane	Name	Nationality	Time	Notes
1st place, gold medalist(s)	5	Marcus Adam	England	20.10	
2nd place, silver medalist(s)	6	John Regis	England	20.16	
3rd place, bronze medalist(s)	7	Ade Mafe	England	20.26	
4	8	Neil de Silva	Trinidad and Tobago	20.40	
5	3	Davidson Ezinwa	Nigeria	20.44	
6	9	Cyprian Enweani	Canada	20.54	
7	2	Paul Greene	Australia	20.58	
8	4	Kennedy Ondiek	Kenya	20.60	
9	1	Abdullahi Tetengi	Nigeria	20.96	
