= Athletics at the 1990 Commonwealth Games – Men's 100 metres =

Men's 100 metres at the 1990 Commonwealth Games
- Venue: Mount Smart Stadium
- Dates: 27-28 January
- Competitors: 47 from 28 nations
- Winning time: 9.93

Medalists
gold medal	Linford Christie	England
silver medal	Davidson Ezinwa	Nigeria
bronze medal	Bruny Surin	Canada

The men's 100 metres event at the 1990 Commonwealth Games was held on 27 and 28 January at the Mount Smart Stadium in Auckland.

== Results ==
=== Heats ===
Qualification: First 5 of each heat (Q) and the next 6 fastest (q) qualified for the quarterfinals.

Wind:

- Heat 1: +0.9 m/s
- Heat 2: +1.3 m/s
- Heat 3: +2.1 m/s
- Heat 4: +3.9 m/s
- Heat 5: +2.0 m/s
- Heat 6: +3.8 m/s

Rank	Heat	Name	Nationality	Time	Notes
1	6	Davidson Ezinwa	Nigeria	10.18	Q
2	5	Abdullahi Tetengi	Nigeria	10.29	Q
3	1	Kennedy Ondiek	Kenya	10.40	Q
4	2	Ray Stewart	Jamaica	10.43	Q
5	1	Linford Christie	England	10.44	Q
6	6	John Mair	Jamaica	10.47	Q
7	3	Bruny Surin	Canada	10.49	Q
7	4	Osmond Ezinwa	Nigeria	10.49	Q
9	5	Tim Jackson	Australia	10.50	Q
10	1	Fabian Muyaba	Zimbabwe	10.51	Q
11	4	Neil de Silva	Trinidad and Tobago	10.52	Q
11	6	John Regis	England	10.52	Q
13	6	Gus Nketia	Ghana	10.53	Q
14	3	Moses Musonge	Uganda	10.54	Q
15	2	Shane Naylor	Australia	10.56	Q
15	3	Joseph Gikonyo	Kenya	10.56	Q
17	5	Jamie Henderson	Scotland	10.58	Q
18	2	Dave Clark	Scotland	10.60	Q
19	3	Elliot Bunney	Scotland	10.65	Q
20	2	Clinton Bufuku	Zambia	10.68	Q
20	4	Yiannis Zisimides	Cyprus	10.68	Q
20	5	Scott Bowden	New Zealand	10.68	Q
23	3	Bertram Haynes	Saint Kitts and Nevis	10.70	Q
23	6	Edward Bitoga	Uganda	10.70	Q
25	1	Peter Ogilvie	Canada	10.74	Q
26	2	Mark Woods	New Zealand	10.77	Q
26	4	Marcus Adam	England	10.77	Q
28	4	Everton Anderson	Canada	10.78	Q
29	1	Murray Gutry	New Zealand	10.83	Q
30	4	Esekiel Wartovo	Papua New Guinea	10.85	q
31	2	Lindel Hodge	British Virgin Islands	10.87	q
32	6	Mohamed Shah Jalal	Bangladesh	10.91	q
33	5	John Hou	Papua New Guinea	10.95	Q
34	2	Leung Wing Kwong	Hong Kong	11.00	q
35	6	Kareem Streete-Thompson	Cayman Islands	11.03	q
36	4	Peauope Suli	Tonga	11.05	q
37	5	Mohamed Shah Alam	Bangladesh	11.12	
38	5	Jayson Majase	Botswana	11.13	
39	1	Shahanuddin Choudhury	Bangladesh	11.14	
40	3	Victor Gamedze	Swaziland	11.15	
41	5	Percy Larame	Seychelles	11.27	
42	3	Emmanuel Mack	Papua New Guinea	11.30	
43	4	Clifford Adams	Gambia	11.31	
44	1	Mark Sherwin	Cook Islands	11.37	
45	2	Alan Rua	Cook Islands	11.88	
	1	Felix Sandy	Sierra Leone	DNS	
	3	Kuckrey Nakat	Vanuatu	DNS	

=== Quarterfinals ===
Qualification: First 4 of each heat (Q) and the next 2 fastest (q) qualified for the semifinals.

Wind:

- Heat 1: +3.5 m/s
- Heat 2: +1.2 m/s
- Heat 3: +3.0 m/s
- Heat 4: -1.1 m/s

Rank	Heat	Name	Nationality	Time	Notes
1	1	Davidson Ezinwa	Nigeria	10.16	Q
2	4	Linford Christie	England	10.19	Q
3	1	Bruny Surin	Canada	10.22	Q
4	1	Marcus Adam	England	10.22	Q
5	1	Tim Jackson	Australia	10.22	Q
6	3	Kennedy Ondiek	Kenya	10.30	Q
7	3	John Regis	England	10.32	Q
8	2	Abdullahi Tetengi	Nigeria	10.39	Q
9	1	Jamie Henderson	Scotland	10.41	q
9	4	Neil de Silva	Trinidad and Tobago	10.41	Q
11	2	Ray Stewart	Jamaica	10.42	Q
12	3	Osmond Ezinwa	Nigeria	10.43	Q
13	1	Joseph Gikonyo	Kenya	10.46	q
14	2	Fabian Muyaba	Zimbabwe	10.52	Q
14	4	John Mair	Jamaica	10.52	Q
16	3	Elliot Bunney	Scotland	10.53	Q
17	3	Moses Musonge	Uganda	10.55	
18	2	Dave Clark	Scotland	10.65	Q
18	4	Gus Nketia	Ghana	10.65	Q
20	3	Everton Anderson	Canada	10.66	
21	2	Shane Naylor	Australia	10.68	
22	2	Edward Bitoga	Uganda	10.69	
23	2	Peter Ogilvie	Canada	10.69	
24	3	Scott Bowden	New Zealand	10.70	
25	4	Mark Woods	New Zealand	10.71	
26	4	Clinton Bufuku	Zambia	10.73	
27	4	Yiannis Zisimides	Cyprus	10.75	
28	1	Bertram Haynes	Saint Kitts and Nevis	10.87	
29	3	Kareem Streete-Thompson	Cayman Islands	10.89	
30	4	Esekiel Wartovo	Papua New Guinea	10.90	
31	2	Murray Gutry	New Zealand	10.92	
32	2	Leung Wing Kwong	Hong Kong	10.97	
32	3	Lindel Hodge	British Virgin Islands	10.97	
34	1	John Hou	Papua New Guinea	11.12	
	1	Mohamed Shah Jalal	Bangladesh	DNS	
	4	Peauope Suli	Tonga	DNS	

=== Semifinals ===
Qualification: First 4 of each heat (Q) and the next 1 fastest (q) qualified for the final.

Wind:

- Heat 1: +3.5 m/s
- Heat 2: +1.3 m/s

Rank	Heat	Name	Nationality	Time	Notes
1	2	Linford Christie	England	10.02	Q, GR
2	1	Davidson Ezinwa	Nigeria	10.19	Q
3	2	Abdullahi Tetengi	Nigeria	10.22	Q
4	2	Bruny Surin	Canada	10.24	Q
5	2	John Regis	England	10.25	Q
6	2	Neil de Silva	Trinidad and Tobago	10.30	q
7	1	Marcus Adam	England	10.31	Q
8	1	Tim Jackson	Australia	10.34	Q
9	1	Osmond Ezinwa	Nigeria	10.41	Q
10	1	Kennedy Ondiek	Kenya	10.41	
11	2	Jamie Henderson	Scotland	10.46	
12	2	Fabian Muyaba	Zimbabwe	10.46	
13	2	Joseph Gikonyo	Kenya	10.50	
14	1	John Mair	Jamaica	10.53	
15	1	Elliot Bunney	Scotland	10.56	
15	2	Gus Nketia	Ghana	10.56	
17	1	Ray Stewart	Jamaica	11.15	
	1	Dave Clark	Scotland	DNS	

=== Final ===
Wind: +3.9 m/s

Rank	Lane	Name	Nationality	Time	Notes
1st place, gold medalist(s)	5	Linford Christie	England	9.93	
2nd place, silver medalist(s)	3	Davidson Ezinwa	Nigeria	10.05	
3rd place, bronze medalist(s)	4	Bruny Surin	Canada	10.12	
4	1	Marcus Adam	England	10.14	
5	2	Tim Jackson	Australia	10.17	
6	6	Abdullahi Tetengi	Nigeria	10.20	
7	9	John Regis	England	10.22	
8	8	Osmond Ezinwa	Nigeria	10.35	
8	7	Neil de Silva	Trinidad and Tobago	10.35	
