= 1988 World Junior Championships in Athletics – Men's 4 × 100 metres relay =

The men's 4×100 metres relay event at the 1988 World Junior Championships in Athletics was held in Sudbury, Ontario, Canada, at Laurentian University Stadium on 30 and 31 July.

== Medalists ==
Gold	Kevin Braunskill; Quincy Watts; Andre Cason; Terrence Warren; United States
Silver	Abdullah Tetengi; Davidson Ezinwa; Victor Nwankwo; Olapade Adeniken; Nigeria
Bronze	Courtney Rumbolt; Lloyd Stapleton; Darren Braithwaite; Jamie Henderson; United Kingdom

== Results ==
=== Final ===
31 July

Rank	Nation	Competitors	Time	Notes
1st place, gold medalist(s)	United States	Kevin Braunskill; Quincy Watts; Andre Cason; Terrence Warren	39.27	
2nd place, silver medalist(s)	Nigeria	Abdullah Tetengi; Davidson Ezinwa; Victor Nwankwo; Olapade Adeniken	39.66	
3rd place, bronze medalist(s)	United Kingdom	Courtney Rumbolt; Lloyd Stapleton; Darren Braithwaite; Jamie Henderson	40.06	
4	East Germany	Lars Olbrich; Sven Matthes; Torsten Gratz; Sven Löchle	40.08	
5	Soviet Union	Anvar Kuchmuradov; Dmitriy Bartenyev; Boris Zhgir; Aleksandr Shlychkov	40.12	
6	Japan	Masahiro Nagura; Tatsuo Sugimoto; Yoshihiro Kato; Takayuki Nakamichi	40.27	
7	Jamaica	Daniel England; Windell Dobson; Dennis Mowatt; Cyrus Allen	40.48	
8	France	Thierry Lecerf; Pascal Théophile; Rodrigue Ceryl; Éric Perrot	40.75	

=== Heats ===
30 July

==== Heat 1 ====
Rank	Nation	Competitors	Time	Notes
1	United States	Kevin Braunskill; Quincy Watts; Andre Cason; Terrence Warren	39.41	Q
2	East Germany	Lars Olbrich; Sven Matthes; Torsten Gratz; Sven Löchle	40.27	Q
3	Japan	Masahiro Nagura; Mitsushige Sugimoto; Yoshihiro Kato; Takayuki Nakamichi	40.40	q
4	Australia	Lynten Johnson; Troy Bennett; Mark Garner; Tim Jackson	40.67	
5	West Germany	Stefan Peters; Stefan Terlinden; Wolfgang Montag; Roman Reiter	40.78	
6	Cuba	Saul Isalgue; Reynaldo Quintero; Leonardo Prevot; Luis Bueno	40.95	
7	Italy	Maurizio De Masi; Maurizio Federici; Andrea Amici; Massimiliano Catalano	40.97	
8	Chinese Taipei	Tseng Hsiao-Sheng; Chen Chin-Hsiung; Lin Kuang-Liang; Nai Hui-Fang	41.23	

==== Heat 2 ====
Rank	Nation	Competitors	Time	Notes
1	Nigeria	Abdullah Tetengi; Davidson Ezinwa; Victor Nwankwo; Olapade Adeniken	39.54	Q
2	Soviet Union	Anvar Kuchmuradov; Dmitriy Bartenyev; Boris Zhgir; Aleksandr Shlychkov	39.83	Q
3	United Kingdom	Courtney Rumbolt; Lloyd Stapleton; Darren Braithwaite; Jamie Henderson	40.12	q
4	Jamaica	Kevin Moore; Windell Dobson; Dennis Mowatt; Cyrus Allen	40.47	q
5	France	Thierry Lecerf; Pascal Théophile; Rodrigue Ceryl; Éric Perrot	40.51	q
6	Canada	Robert Clarke; Brad McCuaig; Johan Pierre; Peter Ogilvie	40.51	
	Belgium	Rudi Vanlancker; Eric Yuma Mbayo; David Branle; Bart Buffel	DQ	

== Participation ==
According to an unofficial count, 62 athletes from 15 countries participated in the event.

- Australia (4)
- Belgium (4)
- Canada (4)
- Chinese Taipei (4)
- Cuba (4)
- East Germany (4)
- France (4)
- Italy (4)
- Jamaica (5)
- Japan (5)
- Nigeria (4)
- Soviet Union (4)
- United Kingdom (4)
- United States (4)
- West Germany (4)
