= 1988 World Junior Championships in Athletics – Men's 100 metres =

The men's 100 metres event at the 1988 World Junior Championships in Athletics was held in Sudbury, Ontario, Canada, at Laurentian University Stadium on 27 and 28 July.

== Medalists ==
Gold	Andre Cason; United States
Silver	Sven Matthes; East Germany
Bronze	Aleksandr Shlychkov; Soviet Union

== Results ==
=== Final ===
28 July
Wind: -2.8 m/s

Rank	Name	Nationality	Time	Notes
1st place, gold medalist(s)	Andre Cason	United States	10.22	
2nd place, silver medalist(s)	Sven Matthes	East Germany	10.28	
3rd place, bronze medalist(s)	Aleksandr Shlychkov	Soviet Union	10.37	
4	Olapade Adeniken	Nigeria	10.40	
5	Abdullah Tetengi	Nigeria	10.47	
6	Darren Braithwaite	United Kingdom	10.61	
7	Neil de Silva	Trinidad and Tobago	10.80	
8	Fabien Muyaba	Zimbabwe	10.85	

=== Semifinals ===
28 July

==== Semifinal 1 ====
Wind: -1.5 m/s

Rank	Name	Nationality	Time	Notes
1	Aleksandr Shlychkov	Soviet Union	10.40	Q
2	Olapade Adeniken	Nigeria	10.42	Q
3	Neil de Silva	Trinidad and Tobago	10.62	Q
4	Darren Braithwaite	United Kingdom	10.62	q
5	Fernando Botasso	Brazil	10.84	
6	Mitsushige Sugimoto	Japan	10.86	
7	Pascal Théophile	France	10.88	
8	Timothy Clinton	Bahamas	11.01	

==== Semifinal 2 ====
Wind: +0.8 m/s

Rank	Name	Nationality	Time	Notes
1	Andre Cason	United States	10.26	Q
2	Sven Matthes	East Germany	10.30	Q
3	Abdullah Tetengi	Nigeria	10.44	Q
4	Fabien Muyaba	Zimbabwe	10.67	q
5	Jamie Henderson	United Kingdom	10.70	
6	Anvar Kuchmuradov	Soviet Union	10.73	
7	Kevin Moore	Jamaica	10.80	
	Éric Perrot	France	DNS	

=== Quarterfinals ===
28 July

==== Quarterfinal 1 ====
Wind: -2.9 m/s

Rank	Name	Nationality	Time	Notes
1	Aleksandr Shlychkov	Soviet Union	10.53	Q
2	Sven Matthes	East Germany	10.76	Q
3	Timothy Clinton	Bahamas	10.95	Q
4	Óscar Fernández	Peru	11.01	
5	Tim Jackson	Australia	11.03	
6	Leif Jonsson	Sweden	11.10	
7	Takayuki Nakamichi	Japan	11.11	
8	Milan Petaković	Yugoslavia	11.19	

==== Quarterfinal 2 ====
Wind: -2.2 m/s

Rank	Name	Nationality	Time	Notes
1	Abdullah Tetengi	Nigeria	10.61	Q
2	Kevin Moore	Jamaica	10.82	Q
3	Mitsushige Sugimoto	Japan	10.87	Q
4	Anvar Kuchmuradov	Soviet Union	10.91	q
5	Fernando Botasso	Brazil	10.93	q
6	Tony Lee	United States	11.00	
7	Eddy Winston	Saint Kitts and Nevis	11.12	
	Carlos Fernandes	Portugal	DNF	

==== Quarterfinal 3 ====
Wind: -2.3 m/s

Rank	Name	Nationality	Time	Notes
1	Olapade Adeniken	Nigeria	10.59	Q
2	Jamie Henderson	United Kingdom	10.87	Q
3	Fabien Muyaba	Zimbabwe	10.88	Q
4	Éric Perrot	France	10.94	q
5	Csaba Zajovics	Hungary	10.94	
6	Stefan Peters	West Germany	10.99	
7	David Branle	Belgium	11.10	
8	Patrik Fallberg	Sweden	11.31	

==== Quarterfinal 4 ====
Wind: -1.8 m/s

Rank	Name	Nationality	Time	Notes
1	Andre Cason	United States	10.37	Q
2	Darren Braithwaite	United Kingdom	10.76	Q
3	Neil de Silva	Trinidad and Tobago	10.79	Q
4	Pascal Théophile	France	10.86	q
5	Gabriel Somma	Argentina	10.95	
6	David Dollé	Switzerland	10.98	
7	Troy Bennett	Australia	10.99	
8	Bart Buffel	Belgium	11.06	

=== Heats ===
27 July

==== Heat 1 ====
Wind: +1.5 m/s

Rank	Name	Nationality	Time	Notes
1	Anvar Kuchmuradov	Soviet Union	10.56	Q
2	Kevin Moore	Jamaica	10.62	Q
3	Leif Jonsson	Sweden	10.63	Q
4	Gabriel Somma	Argentina	10.68	q
5	Tony Lee	United States	10.79	q
6	Mitchell Peters	U.S. Virgin Islands	10.99	
7	Percy Larame	Seychelles	11.26	

==== Heat 2 ====
Wind: -1.0 m/s

Rank	Name	Nationality	Time	Notes
1	Abdullah Tetengi	Nigeria	10.45	Q
2	Fabien Muyaba	Zimbabwe	10.56	Q
3	Fernando Botasso	Brazil	10.70	Q
4	Leonardo Prevot	Cuba	10.90	
5	Tseng Hsiao-Sheng	Chinese Taipei	10.90	
6	Kareem Streete-Thompson	Cayman Islands	11.30	

==== Heat 3 ====
Wind: +0.9 m/s

Rank	Name	Nationality	Time	Notes
1	Aleksandr Shlychkov	Soviet Union	10.54	Q
2	Timothy Clinton	Bahamas	10.70	Q
3	Óscar Fernández	Peru	10.79	Q
4	Cyrus Allen	Jamaica	10.84	
5	Jimmy Stafford	Trinidad and Tobago	10.92	
6	Ally Nyonyi	Tanzania	11.27	
7	Eltaha Gariballa	Sudan	11.91	

==== Heat 4 ====
Wind: +1.4 m/s

Rank	Name	Nationality	Time	Notes
1	Takayuki Nakamichi	Japan	10.51	Q
2	Neil de Silva	Trinidad and Tobago	10.56	Q
3	Tim Jackson	Australia	10.65	Q
4	Pascal Théophile	France	10.67	q
5	Henry Sebbale	Uganda	10.99	
6	Sheung Chau Wai	Hong Kong	11.23	
7	Reece Kalsakau	Vanuatu	11.49	

==== Heat 5 ====
Wind: +1.0 m/s

Rank	Name	Nationality	Time	Notes
1	Olapade Adeniken	Nigeria	10.44	Q
2	Darren Braithwaite	United Kingdom	10.56	Q
3	David Branle	Belgium	10.73	Q
4	Troy Bennett	Australia	10.75	q
5	Eddy Winston	Saint Kitts and Nevis	10.83	q
6	Sriyantha Dissanayake	Sri Lanka	11.22	
7	Alfredo Trujillo	Honduras	11.59	

==== Heat 6 ====
Wind: +0.6 m/s

Rank	Name	Nationality	Time	Notes
1	Mitsushige Sugimoto	Japan	10.63	Q
2	Jamie Henderson	United Kingdom	10.67	Q
3	Carlos Fernandes	Portugal	10.71	Q
4	David Dollé	Switzerland	10.75	q
5	Stefan Peters	West Germany	10.75	q
6	Dani Hakim	Lebanon	11.96	

==== Heat 7 ====
Wind: +1.2 m/s

Rank	Name	Nationality	Time	Notes
1	Csaba Zajovics	Hungary	10.69	Q
2	Sven Matthes	East Germany	10.71	Q
3	Bart Buffel	Belgium	10.87	Q
4	Stefan Terlinden	West Germany	10.88	
5	Derrick Dempster	Canada	11.14	
6	Robert Loua	Guinea	11.25	
7	Mohamed Abdulghani	Bangladesh	11.41	

==== Heat 8 ====
Wind: +0.6 m/s

Rank	Name	Nationality	Time	Notes
1	Andre Cason	United States	10.17	Q
2	Éric Perrot	France	10.61	Q
3	Milan Petaković	Yugoslavia	10.83	Q
4	Patrik Fallberg	Sweden	10.84	q
5	Robert Clarke	Canada	10.85	
6	Athlee Ruan	Anguilla	11.31	
7	Paul Young	Western Samoa	11.73	

== Participation ==
According to an unofficial count, 54 athletes from 41 countries participated in the event.

- Anguilla (1)
- Argentina (1)
- Australia (2)
- Bahamas (1)
- Bangladesh (1)
- Belgium (2)
- Brazil (1)
- Canada (2)
- Cayman Islands (1)
- Chinese Taipei (1)
- Cuba (1)
- East Germany (1)
- France (2)
- Guinea (1)
- Honduras (1)
- Hong Kong (1)
- Hungary (1)
- Jamaica (2)
- Japan (2)
- Lebanon (1)
- Nigeria (2)
- Peru (1)
- Portugal (1)
- Saint Kitts and Nevis (1)
- Seychelles (1)
- Soviet Union (2)
- Sri Lanka (1)
- Sudan (1)
- Sweden (2)
- Switzerland (1)
- Tanzania (1)
- Trinidad and Tobago (2)
- Uganda (1)
- United Kingdom (2)
- United States (2)
- U.S. Virgin Islands (1)
- Vanuatu (1)
- West Germany (2)
- Western Samoa (1)
- Yugoslavia (1)
- Zimbabwe (1)
