= Athletics at the 1996 Summer Olympics – Men's 100 metres =

Men's 100 metres at the Games of the XXVI Olympiad
- Venue: Centennial Olympic Stadium
- Date: July 26–27
- Competitors: 106 from 75 nations
- Winning time: 9.84 WR

Medalists
1st place, gold medalist(s)		Donovan Bailey; Canada
2nd place, silver medalist(s)		Frank Fredericks; Namibia
3rd place, bronze medalist(s)		Ato Boldon; Trinidad and Tobago

Official Video Highlights @ 1:04:34

These are the official results of the men's 100 metres event at the 1996 Summer Olympics in Atlanta. There were a total number of 106 participating athletes from 75 nations, with twelve heats in round 1, five quarterfinals, two semifinals and a final. Each nation was limited to 3 athletes per rules in force since the 1930 Olympic Congress. The event was won by Donovan Bailey of Canada, the nation's first title in the event since Percy Williams won it in 1928.

== Summary ==
Canada's Donovan Bailey won the gold medal, breaking the world record that Leroy Burrell of the United States had set in 1994. Namibia's Frankie Fredericks won the silver medal for a second consecutive Olympics, while Trinidad and Tobago sprinter Ato Boldon won the bronze. It was Trinidad and Tobago's first medal in the event since Hasely Crawford's win in 1976. For Fredericks and Boldon, this was the first of two events where they both medaled behind a world record setting run; Fredericks took silver and Boldon bronze in the 200 metre event where Michael Johnson ran 19.32 to win.

At first Bailey who was going to be the eventual winner did not get a great start. Mitchell and Boldon got terrific starts. Boldon led the race till the 60 metre mark, the point where Canadian Donovan Bailey was gaining on the field. He had an unbelievable surge with a top end speed of over 12 m/s, world record at that time. He won the race with a new 100 metres men's world record time of 9.84 which was 100th of a second faster than the previous record. Fredericks of Namibia edged past Boldon of Trinidad to take silver. Linford Christie, the defending Olympic Champion, was watching the entire event unfold from the point of view of a spectator, having been disqualified after two false starts, the second of which was controversial.

This marked the first time since 1976 (and the boycotted 1980 Games) that no American runner medaled in the 100 metres, with 1992 bronze medalist Dennis Mitchell placing fourth behind Boldon. Counting 1980, it was only the fourth time that the United States missed the podium.

== Background ==
This was the twenty-third time the event was held, having appeared at every Olympics since the first in 1896. For the first time, all three medalists from the previous Games (Great Britain's Linford Christie, Namibia's Frankie Fredericks, and the United States's Dennis Mitchell) returned. Indeed, seven of the eight finalists from 1992 were back in 1996—the other returners were Canadian Bruny Surin, Nigerians Olapade Adeniken and Davidson Ezinwa, and Jamaican Raymond Stewart; only Leroy Burrell did not return to the 100 metres in 1996. Donovan Bailey of Canada had won the 1995 world championships, followed by countryman Surin and then Trinidad and Tobago's Ato Boldon. Christie was the reigning Commonwealth and European champion, and had won the 1993 world championship.

Azerbaijan, Comoros, Guinea-Bissau, Kazakhstan, Kyrgyzstan, Libya, Saint Kitts and Nevis, Saint Vincent and the Grenadines, São Tomé and Príncipe, Ukraine, and Uzbekistan appeared in the event for the first time. Russia appeared independently for the first time since 1912 and Latvia did so for the first time since 1924. The United States made its 22nd appearance in the event, most of any country, having missed only the boycotted 1980 Games.

== Competition format ==
The event retained the same basic four round format introduced in 1920: heats, quarterfinals, semifinals, and a final. The "fastest loser" system, introduced in 1968, was used again to ensure that the quarterfinals and subsequent rounds had exactly 8 runners per heat; this time, the system was used in both the heats and quarterfinals.

The first round consisted of 12 heats, each with 9 athletes scheduled (2 heats had 8 actually run due to withdrawals). The top three runners in each heat advanced, along with the next four fastest runners overall. This made 40 quarterfinalists, who were divided into 5 heats of 8 runners. The top three runners in each quarterfinal advanced, with one "fastest loser" place. The 16 semifinalists competed in two heats of 8, with the top four in each semifinal advancing to the eight-man final.

== Records ==
These were the standing world and Olympic records (in seconds) prior to the 1996 Summer Olympics.

World record	9.85	(United States) Leroy Burrell	Lausanne (SUI)	July 6, 1994
Olympic record	9.92	(United States) Carl Lewis	Seoul (KOR)	September 24, 1988

Donovan Bailey's 9.84 seconds in the final broke both the world and Olympic records.

== Schedule ==
All times are Eastern Daylight Time (UTC-4)

Date	Time	Round
Friday, 26 July 1996	11:00; 18:30	Heats; Quarterfinals
Saturday, 27 July 1996	19:30; 21:00	Semifinals; Final

== Results ==
=== Round 1 ===
==== Heat 1 ====
Wells had one false start (a second would have resulted in disqualification).

Rank	Lane	Athlete	Nation	Reaction	Time	Notes
1	6	Emmanuel Tuffour	Ghana	0.187	10.15	Q
2	5	Bruny Surin	Canada	0.168	10.18	Q
3	2	Andrey Fedoriv	Russia	0.159	10.39	Q
4	1	Renward Wells	Bahamas	0.156	10.48	
5	3	Chithaka De Soyza	Sri Lanka	0.173	10.55	
6	7	Luís Cunha	Portugal	0.149	10.65	
7	9	Patrick Mocci-Raoumbe	Gabon	0.185	10.87	
8	8	Nordine Ould Menira	Mauritania	0.186	10.95	
9	4	Bonifacio Edu	Equatorial Guinea	0.198	11.87	
				Wind: −0.9 m/s		

==== Heat 2 ====
Rank	Lane	Athlete	Nation	Time	Notes
1	1	Davidson Ezinwa	Nigeria	10.03	Q
2	2	Jon Drummond	United States	10.08	Q
3	9	Erik Wymeersch	Belgium	10.24	Q
4	5	Leon Gordon	Jamaica	10.48	
5	6	Stefan Burkart	Switzerland	10.49	
6	7	Barnabe Jolicoeur	Mauritius	10.57	
7	4	Bimal Tarafdar	Bangladesh	10.98	
8	3	Abdul Ghafoor	Afghanistan	12.20	
–	8	Andrew Tynes	Bahamas	DNS	

==== Heat 3 ====
Markoullides had one false start (a second would have resulted in disqualification).

Rank	Lane	Athlete	Nation	Time	Notes
1	5	Ato Boldon	Trinidad and Tobago	10.06	Q
2	7	Anninos Markoullides	Cyprus	10.26	Q
3	2	Kim Collins	Saint Kitts and Nevis	10.27	Q
4	8	Augustine Nketia	New Zealand	10.34	q
5	4	Raymond Stewart	Jamaica	10.38	q
6	9	Stefano Tilli	Italy	10.38	
7	6	Jamal Al-Saffar	Saudi Arabia	10.44	
8	3	Amarildo Almeida	Guinea-Bissau	10.85	
9	1	Mohamed Bakar	Comoros	11.02	

==== Heat 4 ====
Rank	Lane	Athlete	Nation	Time	Notes
1	7	Michael Green	Jamaica	10.16	Q
2	9	Patrick Stevens	Belgium	10.21	Q
3	8	Serhiy Osovych	Ukraine	10.29	Q
4	1	Ezio Madonia	Italy	10.33	q
5	2	Edson Ribeiro	Brazil	10.39	
6	3	Chris Donaldson	New Zealand	10.39	
7	5	Patrik Strenius	Sweden	10.48	
8	4	Toluta'u Koula	Tonga	10.71	
9	6	Vladislav Chernobay	Kyrgyzstan	10.88	

==== Heat 5 ====
Borrega had one false start (a second would have resulted in disqualification).

Rank	Lane	Athlete	Nation	Time	Notes
1	2	Deji Aliu	Nigeria	10.34	Q
2	8	Ousmane Diarra	Mali	10.34	Q
3	3	Wenzhong Chen	China	10.37	Q
4	6	Manuel Borrega	Spain	10.52	
5	7	Hiroyasu Tsuchie	Japan	10.58	
6	9	Ruben Benitez	El Salvador	10.74	
7	1	Vitaly Medvedev	Kazakhstan	10.90	
8	4	Mitchell Peters	Virgin Islands	11.12	
9	5	Bouriema Kimba	Niger	11.24	

==== Heat 6 ====
Rank	Lane	Athlete	Nation	Time	Notes
1	4	Dennis Mitchell	United States	10.24	Q
2	7	Ian Mackie	Great Britain	10.27	Q
3	3	Marc Blume	Germany	10.33	Q
4	9	Alexandros Terzian	Greece	10.48	
5	1	Franck Amegnigan	Togo	10.51	
6	6	Rod Mapstone	Australia	10.56	
7	8	Sayon Cooper	Liberia	10.58	
8	2	Pa Modou Gai	The Gambia	10.72	
9	5	Jorge Castellon	Bolivia	10.74	

==== Heat 7 ====
Rank	Lane	Athlete	Nation	Time	Notes
1	1	Obadele Thompson	Barbados	10.33	Q
2	5	Kostyantyn Rurak	Ukraine	10.37	Q
3	9	Pascal Theophile	France	10.41	Q
4	2	Carlos Gats	Argentina	10.57	
5	3	Joel Mascoll	Saint Vincent and the Grenadines	10.64	
6	6	Anvar Kuchmuradov	Uzbekistan	10.71	
7	4	Arif Akhundov	Azerbaijan	11.11	
8	8	Khaled Othman	Libya	11.65	
9	7	Jean-Olivier Zirignon	Ivory Coast	22.69	

==== Heat 8 ====
Silva had one false start (a second would have resulted in disqualification).

Rank	Lane	Athlete	Nation	Time	Notes
1	7	Michael Marsh	United States	10.14	Q
2	8	Darren Braithwaite	Great Britain	10.29	Q
3	9	Kirk Cummins	Barbados	10.47	Q
4	5	Torbjörn Eriksson	Sweden	10.49	
5	6	Paul Henderson	Australia	10.52	
6	3	Alberto Mendez	Dominican Republic	10.60	
7	2	Arnaldo da Silva	Brazil	10.62	
8	1	Mario Bonello	Malta	10.89	
9	4	Odair Baia	São Tomé and Príncipe	11.05	

==== Heat 9 ====
Douhou had one false start (a second would have resulted in disqualification).

Rank	Lane	Athlete	Nation	Time	Notes
1	8	André da Silva	Brazil	10.25	Q
2	5	Linford Christie	Great Britain	10.26	Q
3	6	Yiannis Zisimides	Cyprus	10.32	Q
4	1	Venancio Jose	Spain	10.34	q
5	9	Hamed Douhou	Ivory Coast	10.53	
6	7	Robert Dennis	Liberia	10.65	
7	2	Donald Onchiri	Kenya	10.66	
8	3	Sun-Kuk Jin	South Korea	10.73	
9	4	Peter Pulu	Papua New Guinea	10.76	

==== Heat 10 ====
Rank	Lane	Athlete	Nation	Time	Notes
1	5	Eric Nkansah	Ghana	10.26	Q
2	2	Needy Guims	France	10.39	Q
3	1	Olapade Adeniken	Nigeria	10.41	Q
4	7	Jone Delai	Fiji	10.42	
5	8	Vitaliy Savin	Kazakhstan	10.52	
6	9	Watson Nyambek	Malaysia	10.55	
7	6	Neil Ryan	Ireland	10.78	
8	3	Javier Verne	Peru	10.91	
9	4	Van Lam Hai	Vietnam	11.14	

==== Heat 11 ====
Karlsson had one false start (a second would have resulted in disqualification).

Rank	Lane	Athlete	Nation	Time	Notes
1	3	Donovan Bailey	Canada	10.24	Q
2	1	Nobuharu Asahara	Japan	10.28	Q
3	2	Peter Karlsson	Sweden	10.35	Q
4	6	Sanusi Turay	Sierra Leone	10.39	
5	9	Sergejs Insakovs	Latvia	10.42	
6	8	Haralambos Papadias	Greece	10.46	
7	7	Hsin-Ping Huang	Chinese Taipei	10.70	
8	4	Eric Agueh	Benin	10.98	
–	5	Alfayaya Embalo	Cape Verde	DNS	

==== Heat 12 ====
Rank	Lane	Athlete	Nation	Time	Notes
1	4	Frank Fredericks	Namibia	10.32	Q
2	1	Glenroy Gilbert	Canada	10.34	Q
3	3	Alexandros Yenovelis	Greece	10.39	Q
4	6	Frutos Feo	Spain	10.56	
5	8	Benjamin Sirimou	Cameroon	10.58	
6	7	Hamed Sadeq	Kuwait	10.81	
7	9	Devon Bean	Bermuda	10.89	
8	5	Robert Loua	Guinea	11.21	
9	2	Mark Sherwin	Cook Islands	11.41	

=== Quarterfinals ===
==== Quarterfinal 1 ====
Rank	Lane	Athlete	Nation	Time	Notes
1	5	Ato Boldon	Trinidad and Tobago	9.95	Q
2	3	Nobuharu Asahara	Japan	10.19	Q
3	6	Eric Nkansah	Ghana	10.24	Q
4	4	Deji Aliu	Nigeria	10.26	
5	7	Glenroy Gilbert	Canada	10.28	
6	8	Marc Blume	Germany	10.33	
7	1	Andrey Fedoriv	Russia	10.34	
8	2	Augustine Nketia	New Zealand	10.35	

==== Quarterfinal 2 ====
Rank	Lane	Athlete	Nation	Time	Notes
1	6	Linford Christie	Great Britain	10.03	Q
2	5	Donovan Bailey	Canada	10.05	Q
3	3	Jon Drummond	United States	10.17	Q
4	4	Emmanuel Tuffour	Ghana	10.18	q
5	2	Erik Wymeersch	Belgium	10.37	
6	7	Olapade Adeniken	Nigeria	10.38	
7	8	Needy Guims	France	10.43	
8	1	Ezio Madonia	Italy	10.43	

==== Quarterfinal 3 ====
Rank	Lane	Athlete	Nation	Time	Notes
1	5	Frank Fredericks	Namibia	9.93	Q
2	3	Davidson Ezinwa	Nigeria	10.08	Q
3	4	Obadele Thompson	Barbados	10.14	Q
4	8	Raymond Stewart	Jamaica	10.18	
5	7	Peter Karlsson	Sweden	10.24	
6	6	Darren Braithwaite	Great Britain	10.27	
7	2	Wenzhong Chen	China	10.29	
8	1	Ousmane Diarra	Mali	10.38	

==== Quarterfinal 4 ====
Rank	Lane	Athlete	Nation	Time	Notes
1	6	Dennis Mitchell	United States	10.09	Q
2	3	Michael Green	Jamaica	10.11	Q
3	4	Anninos Markoullides	Cyprus	10.23	Q
4	5	Patrick Stevens	Belgium	10.31	
5	2	Kim Collins	Saint Kitts and Nevis	10.34	
6	1	Pascal Theophile	France	10.38	
7	7	Serhiy Osovych	Ukraine	10.38	
8	8	Kirk Cummins	Barbados	10.45	

==== Quarterfinal 5 ====
Rank	Lane	Athlete	Nation	Time	Notes
1	6	Michael Marsh	United States	10.04	Q
2	4	Bruny Surin	Canada	10.13	Q
3	5	Ian Mackie	Great Britain	10.25	Q
4	3	André da Silva	Brazil	10.26	
5	2	Alexandros Yenovelis	Greece	10.31	
6	1	Venancio Jose	Spain	10.46	
7	7	Kostyantyn Rurak	Ukraine	10.47	
8	8	Yiannis Zisimides	Cyprus	10.47	

=== Semifinals ===
==== Semifinal 1 ====
Bailey had one false start (a second would have resulted in disqualification).

Rank	Lane	Athlete	Nation	Time	Notes
1	5	Frank Fredericks	Namibia	9.94	Q
2	3	Donovan Bailey	Canada	10.00	Q
3	6	Michael Marsh	United States	10.08	Q
4	4	Michael Green	Jamaica	10.11	Q
5	1	Nobuharu Asahara	Japan	10.16	
6	8	Obadele Thompson	Barbados	10.16	
7	2	Emmanuel Tuffour	Ghana	10.22	
8	7	Anninos Markoullides	Cyprus	10.36	

==== Semifinal 2 ====
Rank	Lane	Athlete	Nation	Time	Notes
1	3	Ato Boldon	Trinidad and Tobago	9.93	Q
2	5	Dennis Mitchell	United States	10.00	Q
3	6	Linford Christie	Great Britain	10.04	Q
4	4	Davidson Ezinwa	Nigeria	10.04	Q
5	1	Bruny Surin	Canada	10.13	
6	2	Jon Drummond	United States	10.16	
7	8	Eric Nkansah	Ghana	10.26	
–	7	Ian Mackie	Great Britain	DNS	

=== Final ===
The final was held on July 27, 1996. Christie was disqualified after two false starts. Boldon also had one false start.

Rank	Lane	Athlete	Nation	Time	Notes
1st place, gold medalist(s)	6	Donovan Bailey	Canada	9.84	WR
2nd place, silver medalist(s)	5	Frank Fredericks	Namibia	9.89	
3rd place, bronze medalist(s)	3	Ato Boldon	Trinidad and Tobago	9.90	
4	4	Dennis Mitchell	United States	9.99	
5	1	Michael Marsh	United States	10.00	
6	7	Davidson Ezinwa	Nigeria	10.14	
7	8	Michael Green	Jamaica	10.16	
—	2	Linford Christie	Great Britain	DQ	
