= 1989 IAAF World Cup – Results =

These are the full results of the 1989 IAAF World Cup which was held on 8–10 September 1989 at the Estadi Olímpic Lluís Companys in Barcelona, Spain.

== Results ==
=== 100 m ===
==== Men ====
8 September
Wind: +0.5 m/s

Rank	Athlete	Team	Time	Points	Notes
1	Linford Christie	Great Britain	10.10	9	
2	Leroy Burrell	United States	10.15	8	
3	Daniel Sangouma (FRA)	Europe	10.17	7	
4	Olapade Adeniken (NGR)	Africa	10.20	6	
5	Tim Jackson (AUS)	Oceania	10.38	5	
6	Sven Matthes	East Germany	10.41	4	
7	José Javier Arqués	Spain	10.48	3	
8	Mardi Lestari (INA)	Asia	10.48	2	
9	Joel Isasi (CUB)	America	10.52	1	

==== Women ====
9 September
Wind: -1.1 m/s

Rank	Athlete	Team	Time	Points	Notes
1	Sheila Echols	United States	11.18	9	
2	Mary Onyali (NGR)	Africa	11.23	8	
3	Silke Möller	East Germany	11.24	7	
4	Laurence Bily (FRA)	Europe	11.31	6	
5	Liliana Allen (CUB)	Americas	11.34	5	
6	Sandra Myers	Spain	11.36	4	
7	Natalya Voronova	Soviet Union	11.49	3	
8	Susanne Broadrick (AUS)	Oceania	11.96	2	
9	Wang Huei-Chen (TPE)	Asia	11.97	1	

=== 200 m ===
==== Men ====
10 September
Wind: +1.9 m/s

Rank	Athlete	Team	Time	Points	Notes
1	Robson da Silva (BRA)	Americas	20.00	9	
2	Floyd Heard	United States	20.36	8	
3	Olapade Adeniken (NGR)	Africa	20.38	7	
4	Stefano Tilli (ITA)	Europe	20.41	6	
5	Marcus Adam	Great Britain	20.67	5	
6	Steffen Bringmann	East Germany	20.74	4	
7	Tim Jackson (AUS)	Oceania	20.93	3	
8	Miguel Ángel Gómez	Spain	20.98	2	
9	Jang Jae-keun (KOR)	Asia	21.25	1	

==== Women ====
8 September
Wind: +0.2 m/s

Rank	Athlete	Team	Time	Points	Notes
1	Silke Möller	East Germany	22.46	9	
2	Mary Onyali (NGR)	Africa	22.82	8	
3	Grace Jackson (JAM)	Americas	22.87	7	
4	Dannette Young	United States	23.08	6	
5	Galina Malchugina	Soviet Union	23.12	5	
6	Laurence Bily (FRA)	Europe	23.20	4	
7	Susanne Broadrick (AUS)	Oceania	24.05	3	
8	Zhang Xiaoqiong (CHN)	Asia	24.25	2	
9	Blanca Lacambra	Spain	24.44	1	

=== 400 m ===
==== Men ====
9 September

Rank	Athlete	Team	Time	Points	Notes
1	Roberto Hernández (CUB)	Americas	44.58	9	
2	Jens Carlowitz	East Germany	44.86	8	
3	Gabriel Tiacoh (CIV)	Africa	44.97	7	
4	Mohammed Al-Malki (OMA)	Asia	45.26	6	
5	Antonio Pettigrew	United States	45.30	5	
6	Cayetano Cornet	Spain	45.61	4	
7	Edgar Itt (FRG)	Europe	45.26	3	
8	Mark Garner (AUS)	Oceania	46.08	2	
9	Derek Redmond	Great Britain	46.68	1	

==== Women ====
10 September

Rank	Athlete	Team	Time	Points	Notes
1	Ana Fidelia Quirot (CUB)	Americas	50.60	9	
2	Grit Breuer	East Germany	50.67	8	
3	Falilat Ogunkoya (NGR)	Africa	51.67	7	
4	Rochelle Stevens	United States	52.16	6	
5	Yelena Ruzina	Soviet Union	52.48	5	
6	Julia Merino	Spain	53.63	4	
7	Shiny Abraham (IND)	Asia	53.80	3	
8	Kathy Sambell (AUS)	Oceania	53.92	2	
DQ	Marie-José Pérec (FRA)	Europe	~~50.30~~	0	^{[A]}

=== 800 m ===
==== Men ====
8 September

Rank	Athlete	Team	Time	Points	Notes
1	Tom McKean	Great Britain	1:44.95	9	
2	Jens-Peter Herold	East Germany	1:45.04	8	
3	Nixon Kiprotich (KEN)	Africa	1:45.08	7	
4	Michael Macinko	United States	1:46.47	6	
5	Simon Doyle (AUS)	Oceania	1:46.67	5	
6	Karin Toledo Luis (MEX)	America	1:47.21	4	
7	Ari Suhonen (FIN)	Europe	1:47.45	3	
8	Tomás de Teresa	Spain	1:47.94	2	
9	Isidro del Prado (PHI)	Asia	1:53.83	1	

==== Women ====
9 September

Rank	Athlete	Team	Time	Points	Notes
1	Ana Fidelia Quirot (CUB)	Americas	1:54.44	9	NR
2	Sigrun Wodars	East Germany	1:55.70	8	
3	Doina Melinte (ROM)	Europe	1:56.55	7	
4	Dalia Matusevičienė	Soviet Union	1:57.27	6	
5	Mayte Zúñiga	Spain	1:58.49	5	
6	Sun Sumei (CHN)	Asia	1:58.56	4	PB
7	Hassiba Boulmerka (ALG)	Africa	2:00.21	3	PB
8	Kerrie Baumgartner (AUS)	Oceania	2:01.58	2	PB
9	Joetta Clark	United States	2:01.94	1	

=== 1500 m ===
==== Men ====
9 September

Rank	Athlete	Team	Time	Points	Notes
1	Abdi Bile (SOM)	Africa	3:35.56	9	
2	Sebastian Coe	Great Britain	3:35.79	8	
3	Jens-Peter Herold	East Germany	3:35.87	7	
4	Gennaro Di Napoli (ITA)	Europe	3:36.65	6	
5	Dean Paulin (AUS)	Oceania	3:38.84	5	
6	Fermín Cacho	Spain	3:40.34	4	
7	Terrance Herrington	United States	3:40.88	3	
8	Edgar de Oliveira (BRA)	Americas	3:41.59	2	
9	Shigeki Nakayama (JPN)	Asia	3:43.23	1	

==== Women ====
8 September

Rank	Athlete	Team	Time	Points	Notes
1	Paula Ivan (ROM)	Europe	4:18.60	9	
2	Yekaterina Podkopayeva	Soviet Union	4:19.44	8	
3	Yvonne Mai	East Germany	4:20.30	7	
4	Montserrat Pujol	Spain	4:21.17	6	
5	Fatima Aouam (MAR)	Africa	4:21.19	5	
6	Feng Yanbo (CHN)	Asia	4:23.54	4	
7	Rita de Jesús (BRA)	Americas	4:25.55	3	
8	Elizabeth Rose (AUS)	Oceania	4:26.49	2	
9	Regina Jacobs	United States	4:30.78	1	

=== 5000/3000 m ===
==== Men ====
10 September

Rank	Athlete	Team	Time	Points	Notes
1	Saïd Aouita (MAR)	Africa	13:23.14	9	
2	John Doherty (IRL)	Europe	13:25.39	8	
3	José Luis Carreira	Spain	13:25.94	7	
4	Jack Buckner	Great Britain	13:26.89	6	
5	Wang Helin (CHN)	Asia	13:45.58	5	
6	Uwe Pflügner	East Germany	13:46.84	4	
7	Andrew Lloyd (AUS)	Oceania	13:54.92	3	
8	Keith Brantly	United States	14:05.14	2	
9	Ignacio Fragoso (MEX)	Americas	14:22.88	1	

==== Women ====
10 September

Rank	Athlete	Team	Time	Points	Notes
1	Yvonne Murray (GBR)	Europe	8:44.32	9	
2	Tatyana Pozdnyakova	Soviet Union	8:49.42	8	
3	PattiSue Plumer	United States	8:54.33	7	
4	Ellen Kiessling	East Germany	8:54.50	6	
5	Hellen Kimaiyo (KEN)	Africa	8:55.35	5	
6	Estela Estévez	Spain	9:08.17	4	
7	Wang Yongmei (CHN)	Asia	9:08.65	3	
8	Silvana Pereira (BRA)	Americas	9:14.22	2	
9	Maree McDonagh (AUS)	Oceania	9:25.34	1	

=== 10,000 m ===
==== Men ====
8 September

Rank	Athlete	Team	Time	Points	Notes
1	Salvatore Antibo (ITA)	Europe	28:05.26	9	
2	Addis Abebe (ETH)	Africa	28:06.43	8	
3	Antonio Prieto	Spain	28:07.42	7	
4	Haruo Urata (JPN)	Asia	28:08.32	6	
5	Rolando Vera (ECU)	Americas	28:11.19	5	
6	Steve Moneghetti (AUS)	Oceania	28:16.83	4	
7	Keith Brantly	United States	28:37.59	3	
8	Gary Staines	Great Britain	28:39.50	2	
9	Andre Wessel	East Germany	29:02.28	1	

==== Women ====
9 September

Rank	Athlete	Team	Time	Points	Notes
1	Kathrin Ullrich	East Germany	31:33.92	9	
2	Ingrid Kristiansen (NOR)	Europe	31:42.01	8	
3	Natalya Sorokivskaya	Soviet Union	32:15.53	7	
4	Nan Davis	United States	32:23.09	6	
5	Jane Ngotho (KEN)	Africa	32:49.81	5	
6	Carmem de Oliveira (BRA)	Americas	33:05.99	4	
7	Marguerite Buist (NZL)	Oceania	33:47.83	3	
8	Marina Prat	Spain	34:14.10	2	

=== 110/100 m hurdles ===
==== Men ====
10 September
Wind: +2.6 m/s

Rank	Athlete	Team	Time	Points	Notes
1	Roger Kingdom	United States	12.87	9	
2	Colin Jackson	Great Britain	12.95	8	
3	Emilio Valle (CUB)	Americas	13.21	7	
4	Holger Pohland	East Germany	13.50	6	
5	Javier Moracho	Spain	13.83	5	
6	Toshihiko Iwasaki (JPN)	Asia	14.00	4	
7	Ikechukwu Mbadugha (NGR)	Africa	14.05	3	
8	John Caliguri (AUS)	Oceania	14.18	2	
	Tomasz Nagórka (POL)	Europe	DNS	0	

==== Women ====
9 September
Wind: -0.3 m/s

Rank	Athlete	Team	Time	Points	Notes
1	Cornelia Oschkenat	East Germany	12.60	9	
2	Lyudmila Narozhilenko	Soviet Union	12.80	8	
3	Lynda Tolbert	United States	12.86	7	
4	Odalys Adams (CUB)	Americas	12.86	6	
5	Claudia Zackiewicz (FRG)	Europe	12.96	5	
6	Liu Huajin (CHN)	Asia	13.43	4	
7	María José Mardomingo	Spain	13.76	3	
8	Yasmina Azzizi (ALG)	Africa	13.99	2	
9	Helen Pirovano (NZL)	Oceania	14.91	1	

=== 400 m hurdles ===
==== Men ====
8 September

Rank	Athlete	Team	Time	Points	Notes
1	David Patrick	United States	48.74	9	
2	Henry Amike (NGR)	Africa	49.24	8	
3	Kriss Akabusi	Great Britain	49.42	7	
4	Jozef Kucej (TCH)	Europe	49.73	6	
5	José Alonso	Spain	50.09	5	
6	John Graham (CAN)	Americas	50.20	4	
7	Leigh Miller (AUS)	Oceania	50.36	3	
8	Hans-Jürgen Ende	East Germany	51.47	2	
	Jasem Al-Dowaila (KUW)	Asia	DNS	0	

==== Women ====
8 September

Rank	Athlete	Team	Time	Points	Notes
1	Sandra Farmer-Patrick	United States	53.84	9	
2	Tatyana Ledovskaya	Soviet Union	54.68	8	
3	Sally Gunnell (GBR)	Europe	55.25	7	
4	Petra Krug	East Germany	55.56	6	
5	Chen Dongmei (CHN)	Asia	57.40	5	
6	Esther Lahoz	Spain	58.56	4	
7	Liliana Chalá (ECU)	Americas	59.00	3	
8	Helen Graham (AUS)	Oceania	1:01.11	2	
9	Marie Womplou (CIV)	Africa	1:02.03	1	

=== 3000 m steeplechase ===
==== Men ====
9 September

Rank	Athlete	Team	Time	Points	Notes
1	Julius Kariuki (KEN)	Africa	8:20.84	9	
2	Alessandro Lambruschini (ITA)	Europe	8:21.75	8	
3	Hagen Melzer	East Germany	8:23.21	7	
4	Brian Diemer	United States	8:24.52	6	
5	Tom Hanlon	Great Britain	8:28.34	5	
6	Adauto Domingues (BRA)	Americas	8:28.65	4	
7	Benito Nogales	Spain	8:28.91	3	
8	Hiroyuki Itabashi (JPN)	Asia	8:38.69	2	
9	Michael Inwood (AUS)	Oceania	8:46.51	1	

=== 4 × 100 m relay ===
==== Men ====
9 September

Rank	Team	Athletes	Time	Points	Notes
1	United States	Andre Cason, Tony Dees, Daron Council, Slip Watkins	38.29	9	
2	Great Britain	Clarence Callender, John Regis, Marcus Adam, Linford Christie	38.34	8	
3	Europe	Max Morinière (FRA), Bruno Marie-Rose (FRA), Gilles Quénéhervé (FRA), Daniel Sangouma (FRA)	38.47	7	
4	Africa	Amadou Mbaye (SEN), Chidi Imoh (NGR), Olapade Adeniken (NGR), Davidson Ezinwa (NGR)	38.81	6	
5	East Germany	Sven Matthes, Steffen Bringmann, Torsten Heimrath, Steffen Görmer	39.02	5	
6	Americas	Sérgio Menezes (BRA), Félix Stevens (CUB), Joel Isasi (CUB), Andrés Simón (CUB)	39.07	4	
7	Oceania	Shane Naylor (AUS), David Dworjanyn (AUS), Steve McBain (AUS), Tim Jackson (AUS)	39.20	3	
8	Asia	Koji Kurihara (JPN), Susumu Takano (JPN), Kenji Yamauchi (JPN), Takahiro Kasahara (JPN)	39.32	2	
9	Spain	Florencio Gascón, Miguel Ángel García, Valentín Rocandio, José Javier Arqués	39.69	1	

==== Women ====
10 September

Rank	Team	Athletes	Time	Points	Notes
1	East Germany	Kerstin Behrendt, Sabine Günther, Silke Möller, Cornelia Oschkenat	42.21	9	
2	Soviet Union	Natalya Kovtun, Galina Malchugina, Tatyana Papilina, Natalya Voronova	42.76	8	
3	United States	Sheila Echols, Esther Jones, Dawn Sowell, Wendy Vereen	42.83	7	
4	Americas	Odalys Adams (CUB), Pauline Davis (BAH), Grace Jackson (JAM), Liliana Allen (CUB)	43.58	6	
5	Spain	Sandra Myers, Yolanda Díaz, Cristina Castro, Ana Barrenechea	44.62	5	
6	Asia	Zhang Caihua (CHN), Liu Shaomei (CHN), Zhang Xiaoqiong (CHN), Ge Weidong (CHN)	44.91	4	
	Africa	Tina Iheagwam (NGR), Mary Onyali (NGR), Beatrice Utondu (NGR), Rufina Uba (NGR)	DNF	0	
	Oceania	Susanne Broadrick (AUS), Helen Pirovano (NZL), Melinda Gainsford (AUS), Kathy Sambell (AUS)	DQ	0	
	Europe	Françoise Leroux (FRA), Laurence Bily (FRA), Odiah Sidibé (FRA), Patricia Girard (FRA)	DQ	0	

=== 4 × 400 m relay ===
==== Men ====
10 September

Rank	Team	Athletes	Time	Points	Notes
1	Americas	Lázaro Martínez (CUB), Sérgio Menezes (BRA), Howard Burnett (JAM), Roberto Hernández (CUB)	3:00.65	9	
2	United States	Clarence Daniel, Oliver Bridges, Raymond Pierre, Antonio Pettigrew	3:00.99	8	
3	Africa	Simon Kipkemboi (KEN), Lucas Sang (KEN), David Kitur (KEN), Gabriel Tiacoh (CIV)	3:01.88	7	
4	Great Britain	Derek Redmond, Kriss Akabusi, Todd Bennett, Phil Brown	3:02.64	6	
5	East Germany	Volker Thiel, Karsten Just, Jens Carlowitz, Thomas Schönlebe	3:02.73	5	
6	Europe	Norbert Dobeleit (FRG), Vladimir Krylov (URS), Edgar Itt (FRG), Roberto Ribaud (ITA)	3:02.95	4	
7	Oceania	Leigh Miller (AUS), Mark Rosenberg (AUS), Steve Perry (AUS), Mark Garner (AUS)	3:04.88	3	
8	Spain	Manuel Moreno, Cayetano Cornet, Moisés Fernández, José Luis Palacios	3:05.26	2	
9	Asia	Mohammed Al-Malki (OMA), Zhao Cunlin (CHN), Ibrahim Ismail Muftah (QAT), Isidro del Prado (PHI)	3:05.63	1	

==== Women ====
8 September

Rank	Team	Athletes	Time	Points	Notes
1	Americas	Charmaine Crooks (CAN), Pauline Davis (BAH), Grace Jackson (JAM), Ana Fidelia Quirot (CUB)	3:23.05	9	
2	East Germany	Annett Hesselbarth, Katrin Schreiter, Christine Wachtel, Grit Breuer	3:23.97	8	
3	Soviet Union	Lyudmila Dzhigalova, Yelena Golesheva, Marina Shmonina, Yelena Ruzina	3:26.15	7	
4	United States	Celena Mondie, Rochelle Stevens, Jearl Miles, Terri Dendy	3:27.29	6	
5	Africa	Falilat Ogunkoya (NGR), Aïssatou Tandian (SEN), Fatima Yusuf (NGR), Airat Bakare (NGR)	3:29.76	5	
6	Oceania	Maree Holland (AUS), Kerrie Baumgartner (AUS), Kathy Sambell (AUS), Tania Van Heer (AUS)	3:33.72	4	
7	Asia	Chen Dongmei (CHN), Shiny Abraham (IND), Sun Sumei (CHN), Josephine Mary Singarayar (MAS)	3:34.54	3	
8	Spain	Mayte Zúñiga, Julia Merino, Gregoria Ferrer, Alicia Echenique	3:36.50	2	
	Europe	Marie-José Pérec (FRA), Anita Protti (SUI), Judit Forgács (HUN), Linda Keough (GBR)	DQ	0	^{[B]}

=== High jump ===
==== Men ====
10 September

Rank	Athlete	Team	Result	Points	Notes
1	Patrik Sjöberg (SWE)	Europe	2.34	9	
2	Dalton Grant	Great Britain	2.31	8	
3	Javier Sotomayor (CUB)	Americas	2.25	7	
4	Gerd Wessig	East Germany	2.20	5.5	
4	Liu Yunpeng (CHN)	Asia	2.20	5.5	
6	Brian Brown	United States	2.20	4	
7	Gustavo Adolfo Becker	Spain	2.20	2.5	
7	Ian Garrett (AUS)	Oceania	2.20	2.5	
9	Othmane Belfaa (ALG)	Africa	2.20	1	

==== Women ====
9 September

Rank	Athlete	Team	Result	Points	Notes
1	Silvia Costa (CUB)	Americas	2.04	9	
2	Tamara Bykova	Soviet Union	1.97	8	
3	Alina Astafei (ROM)	Europe	1.94	7	
4	Heike Balck	East Germany	1.94	6	
5	Jan Wohlschlag	United States	1.91	4.5	
5	Jin Ling (CHN)	Asia	1.91	4.5	
7	Lucienne N'Da (CIV)	Africa	1.80	3	
8	Gai Kapernick (AUS)	Oceania	1.80	2	
9	Isabel Mozún	Spain	1.75	1	

=== Pole vault ===
==== Men ====
9 September

Rank	Athlete	Team	Result	Points	Notes
1	Philippe Collet (FRA)	Europe	5.75	9	
2	Tim Bright	United States	5.70	8	
3	Uwe Langhammer	East Germany	5.55	7	
4	Javier García	Spain	5.50	6	
5	Simon Arkell (AUS)	Oceania	5.45	5	
6	Liang Xueren (CHN)	Asia	5.40	4	
7	Andy Ashurst	Great Britain	5.40	3	
8	Doug Wood (CAN)	Americas	5.20	2	
9	Sami Si Mohamed (ALG)	Africa	4.60	1	

=== Long jump ===
==== Men ====
8 September

Rank	Athlete	Team	Result	Points	Notes
1	Larry Myricks	United States	8.29	9	
2	Yusuf Alli (NGR)	Africa	8.00	8	
3	Stewart Faulkner	Great Britain	7.84	7	
4	Emiel Mellaard (NED)	Europe	7.82	6	
5	Marco Delonge	East Germany	7.82	5	
6	Chen Zunrong (CHN)	Asia	7.63	4	
7	Antonio Corgos	Spain	7.06	3	
8	Jaime Jefferson (CUB)	Americas	6.52	2	
	Clint Harvey (AUS)	Oceania	NM	0	

==== Women ====
10 September

Rank	Athlete	Team	Result	Points	Notes
1	Galina Chistyakova	Soviet Union	7.10	9	
2	Marieta Ilcu (ROM)	Europe	6.71	8	
3	Nicole Boegman (AUS)	Oceania	6.64	7	
4	Helga Radtke	East Germany	6.54	6	
5	Xiong Qiying (CHN)	Asia	6.51	5	
6	Claire Connor	United States	6.30	4	
7	Eloína Echevarría (CUB)	Americas	6.22	3	
8	Chioma Ajunwa (NGR)	Africa	6.14	2	
9	Isabel López	Spain	6.00	1	

=== Triple jump ===
==== Men ====
9 September

Rank	Athlete	Team	Result	Points	Notes
1	Mike Conley	United States	17.49	9	
2	Vladimir Inozemtsev (URS)	Europe	17.31	8	
3	Jonathan Edwards	Great Britain	17.28	7	
4	Jörg Friess	East Germany	16.85	6	
5	Chen Yanping (CHN)	Asia	16.52	5	
6	Eugene Koranteng (GHA)	Africa	16.46w	4	
7	Jorge Reyna (CUB)	Americas	16.19	3	
8	Matt Sweeney (CUB)	Oceania	15.72	2	
9	Mario Quintero	Spain	15.64w	1	

=== Shot put ===
==== Men ====
8 September

Rank	Athlete	Team	Result	Points	Notes
1	Ulf Timmermann	East Germany	21.68	9	
2	Werner Günthör (SUI)	Europe	21.40	8	
3	Randy Barnes	United States	21.10	7	
4	Gert Weil (CHI)	Americas	19.25	6	
5	Simon Williams	Great Britain	18.49	5	
6	John Minns (AUS)	Americas	18.38	4	
7	Ma Yongfeng (CHN)	Asia	18.20	3	
8	Ahmed Mohamed Achouche (EGY)	Africa	17.40	2	
9	Matias Jiménez	Spain	16.14	1	

==== Women ====
9 September

Rank	Athlete	Team	Result	Points	Notes
1	Huang Zhihong (CHN)	Asia	20.73	9	
2	Heike Hartwig	East Germany	20.62	8	
3	Claudia Losch (FRG)	Europe	20.10	7	
4	Natalya Lisovskaya	Soviet Union	19.76	6	
5	Belsis Laza (CUB)	Americas	19.02	5	
6	Ramona Pagel	United States	18.77	4	
7	Margarita Ramos	Spain	15.61	3	
8	Astra Vitols (AUS)	Oceania	14.67	2	
9	Hanane Khaled (EGY)	Africa	13.26	1	

=== Discus throw ===
==== Men ====
9 September

Rank	Athlete	Team	Result	Points	Notes
1	Jürgen Schult	East Germany	67.12	9	
2	Luis Delís (CUB)	Americas	66.72	8	
3	Rolf Danneberg (FRG)	Europe	65.30	7	
4	Kamy Keshmiri	United States	61.40	6	
5	Paul Nandapi (AUS)	Oceania	58.32	5	
6	David Martínez	Spain	57.46	4	
7	Paul Mardle	Great Britain	56.52	3	
8	Hu Tao (CHN)	Asia	54.72	2	
9	Hassan Ahmed Hamad (EGY)	Africa	52.26	1	

==== Women ====
10 September

Rank	Athlete	Team	Result	Points	Notes
1	Ilke Wyludda	East Germany	71.54	9	
2	Hou Xuemei (CHN)	Asia	66.04	8	
3	Maritza Martén (CUB)	Americas	65.40	7	
4	Tsvetanka Khristova (BUL)	Europe	61.96	6	
5	Olga Davydova	Soviet Union	61.46	5	
6	Lisa-Marie Vizaniari (AUS)	Oceania	57.92	4	
7	Connie Price	United States	52.90	3	
8	Sonia Godall	Spain	48.54	2	
9	Zoubida Laayouni (MAR)	AFrica	48.34	1	

=== Hammer throw ===
==== Men ====
9 September

Rank	Athlete	Team	Result	Points	Notes
1	Heinz Weis (FRG)	Europe	77.68	9	
2	Lance Deal	United States	76.38	8	
3	Ralf Haber	East Germany	76.28	7	
4	Bi Zhong (CHN)	Asia	70.50	6	
5	Eladio Hernández (CUB)	America	68.86	5	
6	Phillip Spivey (AUS)	Oceania	68.40	4	
7	Shane Peacock	Great Britain	67.68	3	
8	Hakim Toumi (ALG)	Africa	67.62	2	
9	Antón María Godall	Spain	62.50	1	

=== Javelin throw ===
==== Men ====
10 September

Rank	Athlete	Team	Result	Points	Notes
1	Steve Backley	Great Britain	85.90	9	CWR
2	Kazuhiro Mizoguchi (JPN)	Asia	82.56	8	
3	Volker Hadwich	East Germany	80.30	7	
4	Mike Barnett	United States	78.28	6	
5	Ramón González (CUB)	Americas	78.02	5	
6	Sigurður Einarsson (ISL)	Europe	73.54	4	
7	John Stapylton-Smith (NZL)	Oceania	71.06	3	
8	Pius Bazighe (NGR)	Africa	65.66	2	
9	Enrique Bassols	Spain	64.24	1	

==== Women ====
8 September

Rank	Athlete	Team	Result	Points	Notes
1	Petra Felke	East Germany	70.32	9	
2	Zhang Li (CHN)	Asia	61.50	8	
3	Laverne Eve (BAH)	Americas	60.32	7	
4	Brigitte Graune (FRG)	Europe	59.76	6	
5	Natalya Yermolovich	Soviet Union	57.52	5	
6	Donna Mayhew	United States	55.38	4	
7	Kaye Nordstrom (NZL)	Oceania	53.26	3	
8	Chinweoke Chikwelu (NGR)	Africa	49.08	2	
9	Natividad Vizcaíno	Spain	46.48	1	

== Notes ==
A^{1} Original winner Perec was disqualified for a lane infringement. B^{1} Violation on second exchange.
