= Athletics at the 1994 Commonwealth Games – Men's 100 metres =

Men's 100 metres at the 1994 Commonwealth Games
- Venue: Centennial Stadium
- Dates: 22-23 August
- Competitors: 60 from 34 nations
- Winning time: 9.91

Medalists
gold medal	Linford Christie	England
silver medal	Michael Green	Jamaica
bronze medal	Frankie Fredericks	Namibia

The men's 100 metres event at the 1994 Commonwealth Games was held on 22 and 23 August at the Centennial Stadium in Victoria, British Columbia.

== Results ==
=== Heats ===
Wind:

- Heat 1: +1.8 m/s
- Heat 2: +1.5 m/s
- Heat 3: +0.6 m/s
- Heat 4: +1.3 m/s
- Heat 5: +1.3 m/s
- Heat 6: +2.1 m/s
- Heat 7: +2.0 m/s
- Heat 8: +1.5 m/s

Rank	Heat	Name	Nationality	Time	Notes
1	8	Glenroy Gilbert	Canada	10.10	Q
2	5	Augustine Nketia	New Zealand	10.11	Q
3	7	Frankie Fredericks	Namibia	10.14	Q
~~4~~	5	~~Horace Dove-Edwin~~	Sierra Leone	~~10.17~~	DQ
4	2	Michael Green	Jamaica	10.20	Q
4	5	Bruny Surin	Canada	10.20	Q
6	8	Damien Marsh	Australia	10.21	Q
7	3	Deji Aliu	Nigeria	10.23	Q
8	4	Ato Boldon	Trinidad and Tobago	10.26	Q
9	2	Franklin Nwankpa	Nigeria	10.27	Q
10	7	Sanusi Turay	Sierra Leone	10.28	Q
11	7	Obadele Thompson	Barbados	10.29	Q
12	5	Terry Williams	England	10.31	q
13	3	Steve Brimacombe	Australia	10.34	Q
14	2	Alfred Stubbs	Bahamas	10.38	Q
14	6	Olapade Adeniken	Nigeria	10.38	Q
16	1	Linford Christie	England	10.39	Q
17	4	Tim Jackson	Australia	10.40	Q
17	4	Robert Esmie	Canada	10.40	Q
17	8	Yiannis Zisimides	Cyprus	10.40	Q
20	5	Mohamed Hosni	Singapore	10.41	q
20	7	John Mair	Jamaica	10.41	q
22	3	Elliot Bunney	Scotland	10.42	Q
23	3	Anninos Marcoullides	Cyprus	10.42	q
24	1	Jamie Henderson	Scotland	10.45	Q
25	8	Tanko Abass	Ghana	10.47	q
26	2	Johann Venter	South Africa	10.49	q
26	7	Salaam Gariba	Ghana	10.49	q
28	6	Jason John	England	10.50	Q
29	5	Warren Johnson	Jamaica	10.51	q
29	6	Fabian Muyaba	Zimbabwe	10.51	Q
29	8	Joseph Gikonyo	Kenya	10.51	
32	2	Eric Nkansah	Ghana	10.54	
33	3	Peter Maitland	Wales	10.55	
34	8	Justice Dipeba	Botswana	10.58	
35	1	Kennedy Ondiek	Kenya	10.59	Q
36	1	Iram Lewis	Bahamas	10.60	
37	2	Azmi Ibrahim	Malaysia	10.63	
38	4	Peter Pulu	Papua New Guinea	10.64	
39	1	Denton Guy-Williams	Sierra Leone	10.66	
40	4	Barnabe Jolicoeur	Mauritius	10.72	
41	2	Abdoulie Janneh	Gambia	10.74	
42	6	Toluta'u Koula	Tonga	10.75	
43	4	Ebrima Bojang	Gambia	10.77	
44	6	Subul Babo	Papua New Guinea	10.79	
45	6	Dominique Méyépa	Mauritius	10.83	
45	7	Tevita Fauonuku	Tonga	10.83	
47	5	Stephen Lewis	Montserrat	10.83	
48	4	Bimal Tarafdar	Bangladesh	10.87	
49	1	Rudiger Gentz	Namibia	10.92	
49	4	Moatshe Molebatsi	Botswana	10.92	
51	5	Osborne Johnson	Saint Vincent and the Grenadines	10.94	
52	7	Frederick Cannon	Nauru	11.01	
53	1	Dexter Browne	Saint Vincent and the Grenadines	11.03	
54	7	Elston Shaw	Belize	11.04	
55	3	Samuel Johnson	Gambia	11.07	
56	6	Jansen Molisingi	Vanuatu	11.07	
57	3	Peter Queeley	Montserrat	11.08	
57	8	Linford Castillo	Belize	11.08	
59	1	Derwin Scatliffe	British Virgin Islands	11.12	
60	2	Razali Matali	Brunei	11.26	

=== Quarterfinals ===
Wind:

- Heat 1: +0.2 m/s
- Heat 2: +0.4 m/s
- Heat 3: +1.8 m/s
- Heat 4: +1.1 m/s

Rank	Heat	Name	Nationality	Time	Notes
1	1	Linford Christie	England	10.02	Q, =GR
2	3	Frankie Fredericks	Namibia	10.04	Q
3	2	Olapade Adeniken	Nigeria	10.11	Q
4	2	Augustine Nketia	New Zealand	10.13	Q
4	4	Glenroy Gilbert	Canada	10.13	Q
6	3	Ato Boldon	Trinidad and Tobago	10.15	Q
7	1	Michael Green	Jamaica	10.17	Q
~~7~~	4	~~Horace Dove-Edwin~~	Sierra Leone	~~10.17~~	DQ
8	2	Damien Marsh	Australia	10.21	Q
9	2	Bruny Surin	Canada	10.21	Q
10	4	Terry Williams	England	10.23	Q
11	4	Obadele Thompson	Barbados	10.27	Q
12	4	Deji Aliu	Nigeria	10.28	
13	2	Jason John	England	10.29	
14	3	Franklin Nwankpa	Nigeria	10.31	Q
15	1	Steve Brimacombe	Australia	10.32	Q
16	3	Elliot Bunney	Scotland	10.34	Q
17	1	Anninos Marcoullides	Cyprus	10.38	Q
18	3	Mohamed Hosni	Singapore	10.41	
19	1	Robert Esmie	Canada	10.42	
20	3	Tim Jackson	Australia	10.43	
21	2	Yiannis Zisimides	Cyprus	10.45	
22	1	Sanusi Turay	Sierra Leone	10.47	
23	1	Tanko Abass	Ghana	10.47	
24	4	Jamie Henderson	Scotland	10.49	
25	3	Alfred Stubbs	Bahamas	10.49	
26	4	Warren Johnson	Jamaica	10.54	
27	4	Kennedy Ondiek	Kenya	10.62	
28	2	Johann Venter	South Africa	10.67	
29	1	Fabian Muyaba	Zimbabwe	10.69	
	2	John Mair	Jamaica	DNS	
	3	Salaam Gariba	Ghana	DNS	

=== Semifinals ===
Wind:

- Heat 1: +1.8 m/s
- Heat 2: +2.3 m/s

Rank	Heat	Name	Nationality	Time	Notes
1	1	Linford Christie	England	9.98	Q, GR
2	2	Frankie Fredericks	Namibia	10.01	Q
3	2	Michael Green	Jamaica	10.04	Q
4	1	Olapade Adeniken	Nigeria	10.05	Q
5	2	Ato Boldon	Trinidad and Tobago	10.09	Q
~~6~~	1	~~Horace Dove-Edwin~~	Sierra Leone	~~10.10~~	DQ
6	2	Glenroy Gilbert	Canada	10.14	Q
7	2	Terry Williams	England	10.17	
8	1	Augustine Nketia	New Zealand	10.19	Q
9	1	Damien Marsh	Australia	10.19	
10	2	Steve Brimacombe	Australia	10.28	
11	2	Obadele Thompson	Barbados	10.29	
12	1	Bruny Surin	Canada	10.30	
13	2	Franklin Nwankpa	Nigeria	10.39	
14	1	Anninos Marcoullides	Cyprus	10.44	
15	1	Elliot Bunney	Scotland	10.50	

=== Final ===
Wind: +1.9 m/s

Rank	Lane	Name	Nationality	Time	Notes
1st place, gold medalist(s)	6	Linford Christie	England	9.91	GR
~~2~~	1	Horace Dove-Edwin	Sierra Leone	~~10.02~~	~~NR~~
2nd place, silver medalist(s)	4	Michael Green	Jamaica	10.05	
3rd place, bronze medalist(s)	3	Frankie Fredericks	Namibia	10.06	
4	2	Ato Boldon	Trinidad and Tobago	10.07	
5	7	Glenroy Gilbert	Canada	10.11	
6	5	Olapade Adeniken	Nigeria	10.11	
7	8	Augustine Nketia	New Zealand	10.42	
