= Athletics at the 1990 Commonwealth Games – Men's 400 metres =

Men's 400 metres at the Commonwealth Games

The men's 400 metres event at the 1990 Commonwealth Games was held on 27 and 28 January at the Mount Smart Stadium in Auckland.

== Medalists ==
Gold	Silver	Bronze
Darren Clark; Australia	Samson Kitur; Kenya	Simeon Kipkemboi; Kenya

== Results ==
=== Heats ===
Qualification: First 6 of each heat (Q) and the next 6 fastest (q) qualified for the quarterfinals.

Rank	Heat	Name	Nationality	Time	Notes
1	2	Samson Kitur	Kenya	46.12	Q
2	4	Stephen Mwanzia	Kenya	46.51	Q
3	5	Darren Clark	Australia	46.64	Q
4	1	Simeon Kipkemboi	Kenya	46.70	Q
5	2	Devon Morris	Jamaica	46.73	Q
6	4	Wayne McDonald	England	46.87	Q
7	1	Trevor Graham	Jamaica	47.11	Q
8	3	Howard Burnett	Jamaica	47.12	Q
9	4	Robert Stone	Australia	47.13	Q
10	1	Mark Garner	Australia	47.23	Q
11	3	Camera Ntereke	Botswana	47.27	Q
12	3	Todd Bennett	England	47.28	Q
13	4	Patrick Delice	Trinidad and Tobago	47.37	Q
14	4	Mike McLean	Canada	47.49	Q
15	4	John Goville	Uganda	47.64	Q
16	1	Craig Purdy	New Zealand	47.67	Q
17	1	Steve O'Brien	Canada	47.85	Q
18	5	Felix Sandy	Sierra Leone	47.89	Q
19	5	Joseph Adam	Seychelles	48.08	Q
20	5	Siebert Straughan	Barbados	48.11	Q
21	5	Anton Skerritt	Canada	48.20	Q
22	1	Mohamed Hossain Milzer	Bangladesh	48.24	Q
22	2	Phil Brown	England	48.24	Q
24	2	Takale Tuna	Papua New Guinea	48.45	Q
25	2	Grant Gilbert	New Zealand	48.47	Q
26	5	Duane Johnson	Guyana	48.49	Q
27	3	Troy Douglas	Bermuda	48.80	Q
28	5	Eugene Matthews	Trinidad and Tobago	48.84	q
29	2	David Teece	Isle of Man	48.99	Q
30	1	Muhammad Sadaqat	Pakistan	49.08	q
31	3	Muhammad Fayyaz	Pakistan	49.19	Q
32	5	Lamin Marikong	Gambia	49.75	q
33	3	Darren Dale	New Zealand	50.27	Q
34	4	John Hou	Papua New Guinea	50.32	q
35	4	Patrick Mchiwiri	Malawi	50.86	q
36	1	Ancel Nalau	Vanuatu	53.32	q
37	2	Baptiste Firiam	Vanuatu	1:03.41	
	3	Alvin Daniel	Trinidad and Tobago	DNF	
	2	Brian Whittle	Scotland	DNS	

=== Quarterfinals ===
Qualification: First 4 of each heat (Q) and the next 2 fastest (q) qualified for the semifinals.

Rank	Heat	Name	Nationality	Time	Notes
1	1	Samson Kitur	Kenya	45.79	Q
2	1	Robert Stone	Australia	46.23	Q
3	3	Devon Morris	Jamaica	46.24	Q
4	1	Howard Burnett	Jamaica	46.33	Q
5	3	Simeon Kipkemboi	Kenya	46.44	Q
6	3	Todd Bennett	England	46.59	Q
7	3	Patrick Delice	Trinidad and Tobago	46.67	Q
8	2	Darren Clark	Australia	46.68	Q
9	3	Anton Skerritt	Canada	46.74	q
10	2	Wayne McDonald	England	46.82	Q
11	1	Felix Sandy	Sierra Leone	46.89	Q
12	4	Stephen Mwanzia	Kenya	46.93	Q
13	4	Phil Brown	England	47.09	Q
14	4	Grant Gilbert	New Zealand	47.11	Q
15	4	Trevor Graham	Jamaica	47.19	Q
16	4	Mark Garner	Australia	47.24	q
17	2	Mike McLean	Canada	47.34	Q
18	2	Troy Douglas	Bermuda	47.41	Q
19	2	Camera Ntereke	Botswana	47.58	
20	3	Siebert Straughan	Barbados	47.78	
21	1	Craig Purdy	New Zealand	47.87	
22	2	Darren Dale	New Zealand	47.98	
23	1	Takale Tuna	Papua New Guinea	47.99	
24	1	Duane Johnson	Guyana	48.04	
25	4	John Goville	Uganda	48.07	
26	2	Joseph Adam	Seychelles	48.51	
27	2	Mohamed Hossain Milzer	Bangladesh	48.60	
28	4	Steve O'Brien	Canada	48.71	
29	4	Muhammad Fayyaz	Pakistan	48.75	
30	3	Muhammad Sadaqat	Pakistan	49.00	
31	3	David Teece	Isle of Man	49.43	
32	1	Patrick Mchiwiri	Malawi	51.69	
33	4	John Hou	Papua New Guinea	52.24	
	2	Eugene Matthews	Trinidad and Tobago	DQ	
	1	Lamin Marikong	Gambia	DNS	
	3	Ancel Nalau	Vanuatu	DNS	

=== Semifinals ===
Qualification: First 4 of each heat (Q) and the next 1 fastest (q) qualified for the final.

Rank	Heat	Name	Nationality	Time	Notes
1	2	Darren Clark	Australia	45.64	Q
2	2	Samson Kitur	Kenya	45.67	Q
3	2	Mark Garner	Australia	46.02	Q
4	2	Todd Bennett	England	46.06	Q
5	1	Simeon Kipkemboi	Kenya	46.22	Q
6	2	Stephen Mwanzia	Kenya	46.28	q
7	1	Robert Stone	Australia	46.29	Q
8	1	Devon Morris	Jamaica	46.65	Q
9	1	Grant Gilbert	New Zealand	46.68	Q
10	1	Trevor Graham	Jamaica	46.89	
11	1	Patrick Delice	Trinidad and Tobago	47.08	
12	1	Wayne McDonald	England	47.13	
13	1	Felix Sandy	Sierra Leone	47.21	
14	2	Howard Burnett	Jamaica	47.22	
15	2	Anton Skerritt	Canada	47.79	
16	1	Mike McLean	Canada	47.81	
17	2	Troy Douglas	Bermuda	48.15	
	2	Phil Brown	England	DNF	

=== Final ===
Rank	Lane	Name	Nationality	Time	Notes
1st place, gold medalist(s)	6	Darren Clark	Australia	44.60	CR
2nd place, silver medalist(s)	4	Samson Kitur	Kenya	44.88	
3rd place, bronze medalist(s)	7	Simeon Kipkemboi	Kenya	44.93	
4	1	Robert Stone	Australia	45.25	
5	8	Devon Morris	Jamaica	45.68	
6	3	Mark Garner	Australia	46.10	
7	2	Grant Gilbert	New Zealand	46.18	
8	9	Stephen Mwanzia	Kenya	46.35	
9	5	Todd Bennett	England	46.64	
