= Athletics at the 1990 Commonwealth Games – Men's 4 × 400 metres relay =

Men's 4 × 400 metres relay at the Commonwealth Games

The men's 4 × 400 metres relay event at the 1990 Commonwealth Games was held on 2 and 3 February at the Mount Smart Stadium in Auckland. In the heats of the race some of the biggest medal favourites, England, Australia, and Trinidad and Tobago were disqualified for a change outside the takeover zone. All three teams protested the decision but to no avail. In their absence, Kenya took gold followed by Scotland and Jamaica.

== Medalists ==
Gold	Silver	Bronze
Kenya; Samson Kitur; Stephen Mwanzia; David Kitur; Simeon Kipkemboi	Scotland; Mark Davidson; Tom McKean; David Strang; Brian Whittle; Duncan Mathieson*	Jamaica; Clive Wright; Devon Morris; Trevor Graham; Howard Burnett; John Mair*

* Athletes who competed in heats only and received medals.

== Results ==
=== Heats ===
Qualification: First 4 teams of each heat (Q) plus the next 1 fastest (q) qualified for the final.

Rank	Heat	Nation	Athletes	Time	Notes
1	1	Kenya	Samson Kitur, Stephen Mwanzia, David Kitur, Simeon Kipkemboi	3:03.55	Q
2	1	Jamaica	John Mair	3:05.26	Q
3	2	New Zealand		3:08.18	Q
4	1	Canada	Mike McLean, Steve O'Brien, Paul Osland, Anton Skerritt	3:08.69	Q
5	1	Scotland	Duncan Mathieson, Brian Whittle	3:10.89	Q
6	2	Pakistan	Bashir Ahmad, Muhammad Fayyaz, Bahre Karam, Muhammad Sadaqat	3:12.95	Q
7	1	Seychelles	Giovanny Fanny, Percy Larame, Philip Sinon, Joseph Adam	3:18.57	q
	2	Australia	Leigh Miller, Mark Garner, Robert Stone, Robert Ballard	DQ	
	2	England	Kriss Akabusi, Lawrence Lynch, Todd Bennett, Roger Black	DQ	
	2	Trinidad and Tobago	Alvin Daniel, Eugene Matthews, Neil de Silva, Patrick Delice	DQ	

=== Final ===
Rank	Nation	Athletes	Time	Notes
1st place, gold medalist(s)	Kenya	Samson Kitur, Stephen Mwanzia, David Kitur, Simeon Kipkemboi	3:02.48	GR
2nd place, silver medalist(s)	Scotland	Mark Davidson, Tom McKean, David Strang, Brian Whittle	3:04.68	
3rd place, bronze medalist(s)	Jamaica	Clive Wright, Devon Morris, Trevor Graham, Howard Burnett	3:04.96	
4	New Zealand	Darren Dale, Andrew Collins, Anthony Green, Dale McClunie	3:06.23	
5	Canada	Mike McLean, Steve O'Brien, Paul Osland, Anton Skerritt	3:06.73	
6	Pakistan	Bashir Ahmad, Muhammad Fayyaz, Bahre Karam, Muhammad Sadaqat	3:11.90	
7	Seychelles	Giovanny Fanny, Percy Larame, Philip Sinon, Joseph Adam	3:18.22	
