= 1988 World Junior Championships in Athletics – Men's 200 metres =

The men's 200 metres event at the 1988 World Junior Championships in Athletics was held in Sudbury, Ontario, Canada, at Laurentian University Stadium on 29 and 30 July.

== Medalists ==
Gold	Kevin Braunskill; United States
Silver	Olapade Adeniken; Nigeria
Bronze	Dmitriy Bartenyev; Soviet Union

== Results ==
=== Final ===
30 July
Wind: +4.2 m/s

Rank	Name	Nationality	Time	Notes
1st place, gold medalist(s)	Kevin Braunskill	United States	20.87 w	
2nd place, silver medalist(s)	Olapade Adeniken	Nigeria	20.88 w	
3rd place, bronze medalist(s)	Dmitriy Bartenyev	Soviet Union	20.92 w	
4	Christopher Barnes	United States	20.99 w	
5	Sven Matthes	East Germany	21.00 w	
6	Aleksandr Goremykin	Soviet Union	21.12 w	
7	Neil de Silva	Trinidad and Tobago	21.16 w	
8	Csaba Zajovics	Hungary	21.23 w	

=== Semifinals ===
29 July

==== Semifinal 1 ====
Wind: +2.4 m/s

Rank	Name	Nationality	Time	Notes
1	Olapade Adeniken	Nigeria	20.83 w	Q
2	Dmitriy Bartenyev	Soviet Union	20.92 w	Q
3	Csaba Zajovics	Hungary	21.08 w	q
4	Masahiro Nagura	Japan	21.39 w	
5	Dean Capobianco	Australia	21.57 w	
6	Maurizio Federici	Italy	21.60 w	
7	Torbjörn Eriksson	Sweden	21.74 w	
8	Rodrigue Ceryl	France	21.75 w	

==== Semifinal 2 ====
Wind: +2.0 m/s

Rank	Name	Nationality	Time	Notes
1	Neil de Silva	Trinidad and Tobago	21.02	Q
2	Kevin Braunskill	United States	21.04	Q
3	Mark Garner	Australia	21.21	
4	Victor Nwankwo	Nigeria	21.38	
5	Didac Mañas	Spain	21.66	
6	Johan Pierre	Canada	21.68	
7	Fabien Muyaba	Zimbabwe	21.77	
8	Wolfgang Montag	West Germany	21.97	

==== Semifinal 3 ====
Wind: +3.1 m/s

Rank	Name	Nationality	Time	Notes
1	Sven Matthes	East Germany	20.81 w	Q
2	Christopher Barnes	United States	20.90 w	Q
3	Aleksandr Goremykin	Soviet Union	20.98 w	q
4	Brad McCuaig	Canada	21.37 w	
5	Lloyd Stapleton	United Kingdom	21.49 w	
6	Roman Reiter	West Germany	21.60 w	
7	Yoshihiro Kato	Japan	21.61 w	
8	Maurizio De Masi	Italy	21.78 w	

=== Heats ===
29 July

==== Heat 1 ====
Wind: +1.7 m/s

Rank	Name	Nationality	Time	Notes
1	Masahiro Nagura	Japan	21.40	Q
2	Brad McCuaig	Canada	21.47	Q
3	Roman Reiter	West Germany	21.63	q
4	Jimmy Stafford	Trinidad and Tobago	21.95	
5	Ally Nyonyi	Tanzania	22.38	
6	William Archer	British Virgin Islands	22.76	
7	Mohamed Abdulghani	Bangladesh	23.10	
	Liu Yao	China	DQ	

==== Heat 2 ====
Wind: +1.4 m/s

Rank	Name	Nationality	Time	Notes
1	Dean Capobianco	Australia	21.67	Q
2	Didac Mañas	Spain	21.73	Q
3	Milan Petaković	Yugoslavia	22.09	
4	Yehuda Moreli	Israel	22.54	
5	Paul Young	Western Samoa	24.02	
	Óscar Fernández	Peru	DQ	
	Francis Amuzu	Ghana	DQ	

==== Heat 3 ====
Wind: +1.5 m/s

Rank	Name	Nationality	Time	Notes
1	Aleksandr Goremykin	Soviet Union	21.06	Q
2	Rodrigue Ceryl	France	21.60	Q
3	Torbjörn Eriksson	Sweden	21.60	q
4	Leonardo Prevot	Cuba	21.92	

==== Heat 4 ====
Wind: +1.0 m/s

Rank	Name	Nationality	Time	Notes
1	Kevin Braunskill	United States	21.03	Q
2	Lloyd Stapleton	United Kingdom	21.53	Q
3	Wolfgang Montag	West Germany	21.66	q
4	Joseph Dias	Senegal	21.91	
5	José Hernández	Puerto Rico	22.43	
6	Jorge Castellón	Bolivia	22.50	
	Robert Loua	Guinea	DQ	

==== Heat 5 ====
Wind: +0.9 m/s

Rank	Name	Nationality	Time	Notes
1	Dmitriy Bartenyev	Soviet Union	21.11	Q
2	Mark Garner	Australia	21.16	Q
3	Johan Pierre	Canada	21.49	q
4	Maurizio Federici	Italy	21.67	q
5	Aurelio Mancheno	Ecuador	22.19	
6	Henry Sebbale	Uganda	22.75	
	Francisco Brenes	Costa Rica	DQ	

==== Heat 6 ====
Wind: +2.5 m/s

Rank	Name	Nationality	Time	Notes
1	Victor Nwankwo	Nigeria	21.40 w	Q
2	Maurizio De Masi	Italy	21.99 w	Q
3	Joel Otim-Bua	Uganda	22.32 w	
4	Sriyantha Dissanayake	Sri Lanka	22.87 w	
5	Alfredo Trujillo	Honduras	23.90 w	
	Leif Jonsson	Sweden	DQ	

==== Heat 7 ====
Wind: +0.7 m/s

Rank	Name	Nationality	Time	Notes
1	Sven Matthes	East Germany	21.19	Q
2	Neil de Silva	Trinidad and Tobago	21.26	Q
3	Fabien Muyaba	Zimbabwe	21.62	q
	Dennis Mowatt	Jamaica	DQ	
	Ebenezer Lawson	Ghana	DQ	

==== Heat 8 ====
Wind: +2.3 m/s

Rank	Name	Nationality	Time	Notes
1	Olapade Adeniken	Nigeria	21.13 w	Q
2	Christopher Barnes	United States	21.16 w	Q
3	Csaba Zajovics	Hungary	21.34 w	q
4	Yoshihiro Kato	Japan	21.63 w	q

== Participation ==
According to an unofficial count, 48 athletes from 36 countries participated in the event.

- Australia (2)
- Bangladesh (1)
- Bolivia (1)
- British Virgin Islands (1)
- Canada (2)
- China (1)
- Costa Rica (1)
- Cuba (1)
- East Germany (1)
- Ecuador (1)
- France (1)
- Ghana (2)
- Guinea (1)
- Honduras (1)
- Hungary (1)
- Israel (1)
- Italy (2)
- Jamaica (1)
- Japan (2)
- Nigeria (2)
- Peru (1)
- Puerto Rico (1)
- Senegal (1)
- Soviet Union (2)
- Spain (1)
- Sri Lanka (1)
- Sweden (2)
- Tanzania (1)
- Trinidad and Tobago (2)
- Uganda (2)
- United Kingdom (1)
- United States (2)
- West Germany (2)
- Western Samoa (1)
- Yugoslavia (1)
- Zimbabwe (1)
