= Athletics at the 1985 Summer Universiade – Women's 3000 metres =

The women's 3000 metres event at the 1985 Summer Universiade was held at the Kobe Universiade Memorial Stadium in Kobe on 3 September 1985.

== Results ==
Rank	Athlete	Nationality	Time	Notes
1st place, gold medalist(s)	Cathy Branta	United States	9:02.75	
2nd place, silver medalist(s)	Kathy Hayes	United States	9:02.92	
3rd place, bronze medalist(s)	Angela Chalmers	Canada	9:03.19	
4	Marina Rodchenkova	Soviet Union	9:03.24	
5	Ulla Marquette	Canada	9:07.86	
6	Elizabeth Lynch	Great Britain	9:09.71	
7	Asunción Sinovas	Spain	9:11.56	
8	Iulia Besliu	Romania	9:16.92	
9	Roberta Brunet	Italy	9:17.10	
10	Teresa Recio	Spain	9:32.91	
11	Marguerite Buist	New Zealand	9:36.78	
12	Shino Izutsu	Japan	9:53.69	
	Margareta Keszeg	Romania	DNF	
