= Athletics at the 1985 Summer Universiade – Women's 10,000 metres =

The women's 10,000 metres event at the 1985 Summer Universiade was held at the Kobe Universiade Memorial Stadium in Kobe on 30 August 1985. It was the first time that the event was contested by women at the Universiade.

== Results ==
Rank	Athlete	Nationality	Time	Notes
1st place, gold medalist(s)	Marina Rodchenkova	Soviet Union	32:58.45	
2nd place, silver medalist(s)	Svetlana Guskova	Soviet Union	32:59.24	
3rd place, bronze medalist(s)	Kirsten O'Hara	United States	33:05.84	
4	Liz Lynch	Great Britain	33:19.14	
5	Ute Jamrozy	West Germany	34:14.82	
6	Shino Izutsu	Japan	34:50.16	
7	Elena Evanoff	Canada	34:54.97	
8	Marguerite Buist	New Zealand	34:50.16?	
9	Luo Yuxiu	China	36:02.41	
10	Chizuko Kuroda	Japan	37:05.18	
11	Rosario Ávalos	Mexico	37:18.97	
12	Bernadette Madigan	Great Britain	38:16.13	
	Robyn Root	United States	DNF	
