= Leonardo Prevost =

Cuban sprinter

Personal information
- Born: 13 June 1971 (age 54)

Sport
- Sport: Athletics
- Event(s): 100 m, 200 m

Leonardo Prevost (born 13 June 1971) is a retired Cuban sprinter who competed in the 100 and 200 metres. He represented his country in the 100 metres and 4 × 100 metres relay at the 1995 World Championships.

He later worked as a coach, among others of the Colombian Norma González.

== International competitions ==
Year	Competition	Venue	Position	Event	Notes
Representing Cuba
1988	Central American and Caribbean; Junior Championships (U20)	Nassau, Bahamas	36th (h)	100 m	10.90
1988	Central American and Caribbean; Junior Championships (U20)	Nassau, Bahamas	25th (h)	200 m	21.92
1988	Central American and Caribbean; Junior Championships (U20)	Nassau, Bahamas	3rd	4 × 100 m relay	40.95
1988	World Junior Championships	Sudbury, Canada	19th (h)	100 m	10.69
1988	World Junior Championships	Sudbury, Canada	19th (qf)	200 m	10.69
1988	World Junior Championships	Sudbury, Canada	12th (h)	4 × 100 m relay	40.25
1990	Central American and Caribbean; Junior Championships (U20)	Havana, Cuba	5th	100 m	10.69
1990	Central American and Caribbean; Junior Championships (U20)	Havana, Cuba	7th	200 m	22.02
1990	Central American and Caribbean; Junior Championships (U20)	Havana, Cuba	1st	4 × 100 m relay	40.62
1990	World Junior Championships	Plovdiv, Bulgaria	19th (qf)	100 m	10.69
1990	World Junior Championships	Plovdiv, Bulgaria	8th	4 × 100 m relay	40.25
1990	World Junior Championships	Plovdiv, Bulgaria	12th (h)	4 × 400 m relay	3:10.49
1993	Central American and Caribbean Championships	Cali, Colombia	2nd	100 m	10.34 (w)
1993	Central American and Caribbean Championships	Cali, Colombia	3rd	4 × 100 m relay	39.72
1994	Goodwill Games	Saint Petersburg, Russia	2nd	4 × 100 m relay	38.76
1994	Ibero-American Championships	Mar del Plata, Argentina	4th	100 m	10.58
1994	Ibero-American Championships	Mar del Plata, Argentina	3rd	200 m	20.61
1994	Ibero-American Championships	Mar del Plata, Argentina	1st	4 × 100 m relay	39.99
1995	Pan American Games	Mar del Plata, Argentina	5th	100 m	10.36 (w)
1995	Pan American Games	Mar del Plata, Argentina	10th (sf)	200 m	20.91
1995	World Championships	Gothenburg, Sweden	51st (h)	100 m	10.60
1995	World Championships	Gothenburg, Sweden	–	4 × 100 m relay	DNF

== Personal bests ==
Outdoor

- 100 metres – 10.29 (-0.1 m/s, Havana 1995)
- 200 metres – 20.61 (+1.2 m/s, Mar del Plata 1994)
