= Tim Jackson (sprinter) =

Australian sprinter

Timothy David Jackson (born 4 July 1969) is an Australian sprinter who competed in the 1996 Summer Olympics.

His PB for the 100m Sprint was 10.24

Tim was Australian Junior Champion in the 200 metres in 1988. And 100 metres junior champion in 1989.

Tim attended Turramurra High School on Sydney's Upper North Shore. The school has four House names of which one is Jackson.

== International competitions ==
Year	Competition	Venue	Position	Event	Notes
Representing Australia
1988	World Junior Championships	Sudbury, Canada	22nd (qf)	100 m	11.03
1988	World Junior Championships	Sudbury, Canada	10th (h)	4x100 m relay	40.67
1989	World Cup	Barcelona, Spain	5th	100 m	10.38^{1}
1989	World Cup	Barcelona, Spain	5th	200 m	20.93^{1}
1989	World Cup	Barcelona, Spain	7th	4×100 m relay	39.20^{1}
1990	Commonwealth Games	Auckland, New Zealand	5th	100 m	10.17
1990	Commonwealth Games	Auckland, New Zealand	8th (qf)	200 m	20.88^{2}
1993	World Championships	Stuttgart, Germany	5th	4x100 m relay	38.69
1994	Commonwealth Games	Victoria, Canada	6th (qf)	100 m	10.43
1994	Commonwealth Games	Victoria, Canada	2nd	4x100 m relay	38.88
1995	World Championships	Gothenburg, Sweden	2nd	4x100 m relay	38.50
1996	Olympic Games	Atlanta, United States	5th (h)	4x100 m relay	38.93^{3}

^{1}Representing Oceania
^{2}Did not start in the semifinals
^{3}Disqualified in the semifinals
