= Abdullahi Tetengi =

Nigerian sprinter

Personal information
- Born: 15 July 1969 (age 56)
- Height: 1.74 m (5 ft 9 in)
- Weight: 65 kg (143 lb)

Sport
- Sport: Athletics
- Events: 100 m, 200 m
Medal record
Men's athletics
Representing Nigeria
African Championships
Gold medal – first place	1990 Cairo	4×100 m
Silver medal – second place	1990 Cairo	100 m
Silver medal – second place	1990 Cairo	200 m

Abdullahi Tetengi (born 15 July 1969) is a retired Nigerian athlete who competed in sprinting events. He represented his country at the 1988 Summer Olympics and 1990 Commonwealth Games. In addition, he won two silver medals at the 1990 African Championships.

== International competitions ==
Year	Competition	Venue	Position	Event	Notes
Representing Nigeria
1986	World Junior Championships	Athens, Greece	12th (qf)	100 m	10.71
1986	World Junior Championships	Athens, Greece	11th (sf)	200 m	21.57
1986	World Junior Championships	Athens, Greece	13th (h)	4 × 100 m relay	40.99
1988	World Junior Championships	Sudbury, Canada	5th	100 m	10.47
1988	World Junior Championships	Sudbury, Canada	2nd	4 × 100 m relay	39.66
1988	Olympic Games	Seoul, South Korea	6th (h)	4 × 100 m relay	39.15
1990	Commonwealth Games	Auckland, New Zealand	6th	100 m	10.20 (w)
1990	Commonwealth Games	Auckland, New Zealand	9th	200 m	20.96 (w)
1990	Commonwealth Games	Auckland, New Zealand	2nd	4 × 100 m relay	38.85
1990	African Championships	Cairo, Egypt	2nd	100 m	10.36
1990	African Championships	Cairo, Egypt	2nd	200 m	21.01
1991	World Indoor Championships	Seville, Spain	25th (h)	60 m	6.85
1991	World Indoor Championships	Seville, Spain	18th (h)	200 m	21.76

== Personal bests ==
Outdoor

- 100 metres – 10.12 (Bauchi 1990)
- 200 metres – 20.39 (Bauchi 1990)

Indoor

- 60 metres – 6.85 (Seville 1991)
- 200 metres – 21.76 (Seville 1991)
