= Patrick Delice =

Trinidad and Tobago sprinter

Personal information
- Born: 12 November 1967 (age 58) Point Cumana, Trinidad and Tobago

Sport
- Sport: Track and field
Medal record
Representing Trinidad and Tobago
Commonwealth Games
| Bronze medal – third place | 1994 Victoria | 4x400m relay |
Central American and Caribbean Games
| Silver medal – second place | 1993 Ponce | 4x400m relay |
| Bronze medal – third place | 1993 Ponce | 100m |

Patrick Delice (born 12 November 1967) is a retired athlete from Trinidad and Tobago who specialized in the 200 and 400 metres.

His personal best time over 400 m was 44.58 seconds, achieved in May 1993 in Abilene, TX. He holds one national record, in 4 x 400 metres relay together with Neil de Silva, Alvin Daniel and Ian Morris, with 3:01.05 minutes achieved in the heats of the 1992 Summer Olympics.

== International competitions ==
| Year | Competition | Venue | Position | Event | Notes |
Representing Trinidad and Tobago
| 1987 | Pan American Games | Indianapolis, United States | (sf) | 400 m | 48.90 |
| 1988 | Olympic Games | Seoul, South Korea | 22nd (h) | 400 m | 45.75 |
| 1989 | World Indoor Championships | Budapest, Hungary | 21st (h) | 400 m | 47.86 |
| 1989 | Central American and Caribbean Championships | San Juan, Puerto Rico | 4th | 200 m | 20.98 |
| 1990 | Commonwealth Games | Auckland, New Zealand | 11th (sf) | 400 m | 47.08 |
| 1990 | Commonwealth Games | Auckland, New Zealand | – | 4 × 400 m relay | DQ |
| 1991 | Pan American Games | Havana, Cuba | 4th | 4 × 400 m relay | 3:06.91 |
| 1991 | World Championships | Tokyo, Japan | 16th (qf) | 400 m | 45.78 |
| 1992 | Olympic Games | Barcelona, Spain | 37th (h) | 400 m | 46.58 |
| 1992 | Olympic Games | Barcelona, Spain | 7th | 4 × 400 m relay | 3:03.31 |
| 1993 | World Championships | Stuttgart, Germany | 19th (qf) | 200 m | 20.88 |
| 1993 | World Championships | Stuttgart, Germany | 17th (qf) | 400 m | 45.70 |
| 1993 | World Championships | Stuttgart, Germany | 20th (h) | 4 × 100 m relay | 40.24 |
| 1993 | Central American and Caribbean Games | Ponce, Puerto Rico | 3rd | 100 m | 10.62 |
| 1993 | Central American and Caribbean Games | Ponce, Puerto Rico | 5th | 200 m | 21.24 |
| 1993 | Central American and Caribbean Games | Ponce, Puerto Rico | 5th | 4 × 100 m relay | 40.73 |
| 1993 | Central American and Caribbean Games | Ponce, Puerto Rico | 2nd | 4 × 400 m relay | 3:06.96 |
| 1994 | Commonwealth Games | Victoria, Canada | 5th | 400 m | 45.89 |
| 1994 | Commonwealth Games | Victoria, Canada | 3rd | 4 × 400 m relay | 3:02.78 |
| 1995 | Pan American Games | Mar del Plata, Argentina | 19th (h) | 100 m | 11.04 (w) |
| 1995 | World Championships | Gothenburg, Sweden | 43rd (h) | 100 m | 10.69 |
| 1995 | World Championships | Gothenburg, Sweden | 22nd (h) | 4 × 100 m relay | 40.09 |
