= Neil de Silva =

Trinidad and Tobago sprinter

Personal information
- Born: 15 November 1969 (age 56) Arima, Trinidad and Tobago

Sport
- Sport: Track and field
Medal record
Representing Trinidad and Tobago
World Indoor Championships
| Silver medal – second place | 1993 Toronto | 4x400m relay |
Commonwealth Games
| Bronze medal – third place | 1994 Victoria | 4x400m relay |
Pan American Games
| Bronze medal – third place | 1995 Mar del Plata | 4x400m relay |
Central American and Caribbean Games
| Silver medal – second place | 1993 Ponce | 400m |
| Silver medal – second place | 1993 Ponce | 4x400m relay |

Neil de Silva (born 15 November 1969 on Trinidad) is a retired male track and field athlete from Trinidad and Tobago who specialized in the 200 and 400 metres.

His personal best time over 400 m was 45.02 seconds, achieved during the 1996 Olympics. He holds one national record, in 4 x 400 metres relay together with Patrick Delice, Alvin Daniel and Ian Morris, with 3:01.05 minutes achieved in the heats of the 1992 Summer Olympics.

== International competitions ==
| Year | Competition | Venue | Position | Event | Notes |
Representing Trinidad and Tobago
| 1988 | World Junior Championships | Sudbury, Canada | 7th | 100 m | 10.80 (-2.8 m/s) |
| 1988 | World Junior Championships | Sudbury, Canada | 7th | 200 m | 21.16 w (+4.2 m/s) |
| 1990 | Commonwealth Games | Auckland, New Zealand | 8th | 100 m | 10.35 |
| 1990 | Commonwealth Games | Auckland, New Zealand | 4th | 200 m | 20.40 |
| 1990 | Commonwealth Games | Auckland, New Zealand | – | 4 x 400 m relay | DQ |
| 1991 | World Indoor Championships | Seville, Spain | – | 200 m | DQ |
| 1991 | World Indoor Championships | Seville, Spain | – | 4 x 400 m relay | DQ |
| 1992 | Olympic Games | Barcelona, Spain | 14th (qf) | 200 m | 20.66^{1} |
| 1992 | Olympic Games | Barcelona, Spain | 7th | 4 x 400 m relay | 3:03.31 |
| 1993 | World Indoor Championships | Toronto, Ontario, Canada | 17th (h) | 200 m | 21.43 |
| 1993 | World Indoor Championships | Toronto, Ontario, Canada | 2nd | 4 x 400 m relay | 3:07.02 |
| 1993 | Central American and Caribbean Games | Ponce, Puerto Rico | 2nd | 400 m | 46.07 |
| 1993 | Central American and Caribbean Games | Ponce, Puerto Rico | 5th | 4 × 100 m relay | 40.73 |
| 1993 | Central American and Caribbean Games | Ponce, Puerto Rico | 2nd | 4 × 400 m relay | 3:06.96 |
| 1993 | World Championships | Stuttgart, Germany | 12th (sf) | 400 m | 45.66 |
| 1993 | World Championships | Stuttgart, Germany | 19th (h) | 4 x 100 m relay | 40.24 |
| 1994 | Commonwealth Games | Victoria, British Columbia, Canada | 7th | 400 m | 46.27 |
| 1994 | Commonwealth Games | Victoria, British Columbia, Canada | 3rd | 4 x 400 m relay | 3:02.78 |
| 1995 | Pan American Games | Mar del Plata, Argentina | 12th (h) | 200 m | 21.03 |
| 1995 | Pan American Games | Mar del Plata, Argentina | 3rd | 4 x 400 m relay | 3:02.24 |
| 1995 | World Championships | Gothenburg, Sweden | 28th (qf) | 200 m | 21.01 |
| 1995 | World Championships | Gothenburg, Sweden | 22nd (h) | 4 x 100 m relay | 40.09 |
| 1996 | Olympic Games | Atlanta, United States | 16th (sf) | 200 m | 21.26 |
| 1996 | Olympic Games | Atlanta, United States | 13th (sf) | 400 m | 45.56 |
| 1999 | Central American and Caribbean Championships | Bridgetown, Barbados | 3rd | 400 m | 45.61 |
| 1999 | Pan American Games | Winnipeg, Canada | 5th | 400 m | 45.42 |
| 1999 | Pan American Games | Winnipeg, Canada | 8th (h) | 4 x 400 m relay | 3:08.28 |
| 1999 | World Championships | Seville, Spain | – | 400 m | DQ |
| 2000 | Olympic Games | Sydney, Australia | 54th (h) | 400 m | 46.84 |
| 2000 | Olympic Games | Sydney, Australia | 24th (h) | 4 x 400 m relay | 3:07.51 |

^{1}Disqualified in the semifinals
