= Mark Garner =

Australian sprinter

Mark Garner (born 30 June 1969, in New South Wales) is a retired sprinter from Australia, who represented his native country at two consecutive Summer Olympics, starting in 1988 (Seoul, South Korea). His best result was winning the silver medal in the men's 4 × 400 m relay at the 1988 World Junior Championships.

== Achievements ==
Year	Competition	Venue	Position	Event	Notes
Representing Australia
1986	World Junior Championships	Athens, Greece	8th (sf)	200m	21.42 (wind: -0.6 m/s)
1986	World Junior Championships	Athens, Greece	10th (h)	4 × 100 m relay	40.56
1986	World Junior Championships	Athens, Greece	9th (h)	4 × 400 m relay	3:09.65
1988	World Junior Championships	Sudbury, Canada	9th (sf)	200m	21.21 (wind: +2.0 m/s)
1988	World Junior Championships	Sudbury, Canada	10th (h)	4 × 100 m relay	40.67
1988	World Junior Championships	Sudbury, Canada	2nd	4 × 400 m relay	3:07.60
1988	Olympic Games	Seoul, South Korea	26th (qf)	200m	21.08
1988	Olympic Games	Seoul, South Korea	6th	4 × 400 m	3:02.49
1989	World Cup	Barcelona, Spain	8th	400 m	46.08^{1}
1989	World Cup	Barcelona, Spain	7th	4×400 m relay	3:04.88^{1}
1990	Commonwealth Games	Auckland, New Zealand	6th	400m	46.10
1990	Commonwealth Games	Auckland, New Zealand	–	4 × 400 m	DQ
1991	World Indoor Championships	Seville, Spain	8th (sf)	400m	47.06
1991	World Indoor Championships	Seville, Spain	4th	4 × 400 m	3:08,49
1991	World Championships	Tokyo, Japan	8th	400m	45.47
1992	Olympic Games	Barcelona, Spain	28th	400m (qf)	46.85

^{1}Representing Oceania
