= Marcus Adam =

English sportsperson (born 1968)

Personal information
- Nationality: British (English)
- Born: 28 February 1968 (age 58) London, England
- Height: 182 cm (6 ft 0 in)
- Weight: 82 kg (181 lb)

Sport
- Sport: Athletics
- Event: Sprints
- Club: Belgrave Harriers
Medal record
Men's athletics
Representing Great Britain
European Championships
Silver medal – second place	1990 Split	4×100 m
Representing England
Commonwealth Games
Gold medal – first place	1990 Auckland	200 m
Gold medal – first place	1990 Auckland	4×100 m

Marcus Adam (born 28 February 1968) is an English retired sportsperson, who represented Great Britain as both a sprinter and a bobsledder.

Competing in athletics, he won the gold medal in the 200 metres at the 1990 Commonwealth Games, and also won gold and silver medals respectively in the 4 x 100 metres relay at the 1990 Commonwealth Games and 1990 European Championships. He is also a member of the team which holds the British record in the 4 x 200 metres relay.

After retiring from athletics, he shifted to the sport of bobsleigh. He competed in the two-man bobsleigh event at the 2002 Winter Olympics (finishing in tenth place), having previously competed as a sprinter at the 1992 Summer Olympics (finishing in eighth place in the 200 metres and fourth place in the 4 x 100 metres relay).

== Biography ==
Adam was born in London. At the 1987 European Junior Athletics Championships, he won gold medals in both the 200 metres and the 4 x 100 metres relay. In the same year he won his first medal at the UK Championships, with a bronze medal in the 100 metres behind Linford Christie and Jamie Henderson.

In 1989, Adam started by winning the silver medal at the Amateur Athletics Association (AAA) Indoor Championships. He then won both the 100 and 200 metres at the UK Championships, and at the 1989 AAA Championships in the same year he won the silver medal in the 100 metres and the gold medal in the 200 metres. Also, in June 1989 he helped establish a British record of 1:21.29 minutes in the rarely contested 4 x 200 metres relay (together with Ade Mafe, Linford Christie and John Regis). This record still stands. In February 1990 he helped establish a new British indoor record of 1:22.99 minutes in the same event. (The time was beaten in March 1991.) Also in the 1989–90 indoor season, Adam won the 200 metres race at the AAA Indoor Championships.

Adam's international breakthrough came in the 1990 outdoor season. One of the season highlights was the 1990 Commonwealth Games. Adam finished fourth in the 100 metres event with a wind-aided time of 10.14 seconds, 0.02 seconds behind bronze medallist Bruny Surin. He then won the 200 metres with a wind-aided time of 20.10 seconds, ahead of his fellow English athletes John Regis and Ade Mafe, who finished second and third. Adam would never run faster than these two wind-aided times at the Commonwealth Games. He went on to win a second gold medal in the 4 x 100 metres relay (together with Clarence Callender, John Regis and Linford Christie). Adam also participated in the 1990 European Championships. He reached the semi-finals of the 200 metres, and won a silver medal in the 4 x 100 metres relay (together with Darren Braithwaite, John Regis and Linford Christie). The time of 37.98 seconds was a British record, which would stand until 1993.

Adam achieved a personal best time in the 100 metres in July 1991, clocking in 10.23 seconds at a meet in Birmingham.

In the 1991–92 indoor season, Adam competed at the 1992 European Indoor Championships, reaching the semi-finals of the 200 metres.

In June 1992, Adam achieved his lifetime best time in the 200 metres, with a time of 20.41 seconds at a meet in Dijon.

At the 1992 Summer Olympics, Adam reached the final of the 200 metres, finishing in eighth place with a time of 20.80 seconds. He was also a member of the British 4 × 100 m relay team which finished in fourth place. Domestically, Adam won the bronze medal in 100 metres at the AAA Championships, and at the UK Championships he won the bronze medal in 100 metres and the gold medal in the 200 metres.

Adam was then absent from the spotlight for several years. He made a brief return in the winter of 1999, when he competed at the World Indoor Championships, and won the 200 metres event at the AAA Indoor Championships.

== Bobsleigh ==
Adam later took up the sport of bobsleigh. As a brakeman, he finished tenth in the two-man event at the 2002 Winter Olympics together with Lee Johnston.
