= Muhamad Hosni Muhamad =

Singaporean track and field sprinter and coach

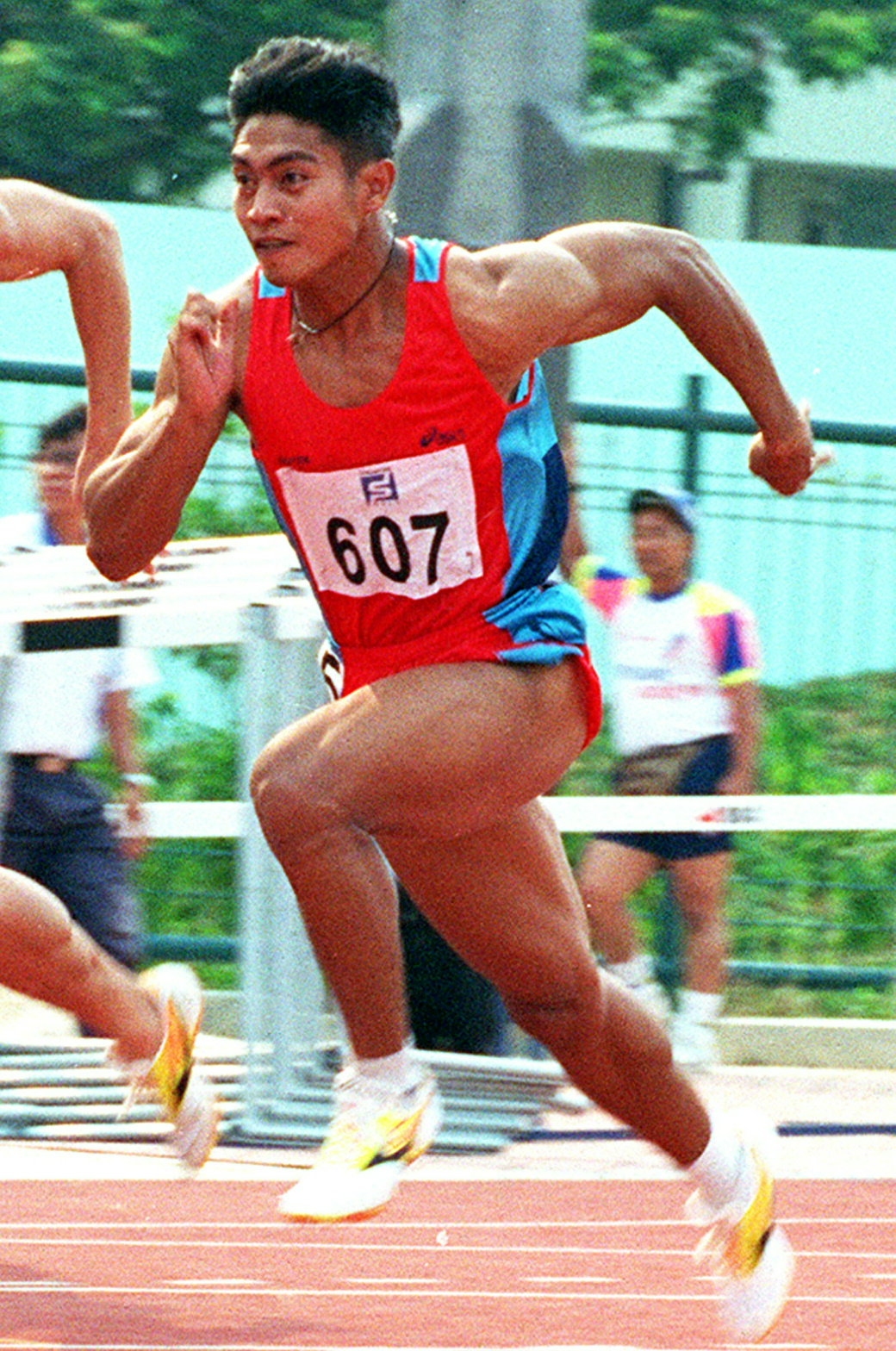

Personal information
- Full name: Muhamad Hosni Bin Muhamad
- Born: 15 February 1972 (age 54) Singapore

Sport
- Country: Singapore
- Sport: Track and field
- Event: Sprints
- Retired: 1997

Achievements and titles
- Personal bests: 100 m: 10.41 and 10.2 (ht)
Medal record
Men's athletics
Representing Singapore
Event	1st	2nd	3rd
Singapore Open	2	0	0
Indonesia Open	2	0	0
Malaysia Open	2	0	0
Taiwan Open	1	0	0
Tai Po International	0	1	0
Bob Hasan Invitational	0	0	1
SEA Games 4x100 m relay	0	0	1
Total	7	1	2

Muhamad Hosni Muhamad (born 15 February 1972) is a Singaporean track coach and former track and field sprinter who specialised in the 100 metres. He represented Singapore in athletics at the 1993 Southeast Asian Games, the 1994 Asian Games and the 1994 Commonwealth Games, where he was the flag bearer for the Singapore contingent. Hosni retired from competitive running in 1997. Considered one of the fastest sprinter in Singapore sprints record.

== Professional athletics career ==
=== Personal Bests ===
Event	Time (seconds)	Meet	Venue	Date	Reference
100 metres	10.41	1994 Commonwealth Games	Victoria, Canada	22 August 1994	
100 metres	10.2 (ht)	19th Flash Athletic Club Track & Field Championships	Singapore, Singapore	3 July 1994	

=== Competitions ===
Year	Competition	Venue	Position	Event	Time (seconds)	Reference
1992	Singapore Open Track & Field Championships	Singapore	1st	100 m	10.3 (ht) CR	
1992	Indonesia Open Track & Field Championships	Jakarta, Indonesia	1st	100 m	10.60	
1992	Malaysia Open Track & Field Championships	Kuala Lumpur, Malaysia	1st	100 m	10.64	
1993	Southeast Asian Games	Singapore	3rd	4 x 100 m relay	40.13	
1993	Tai Po International Athletics	Tai Po, Hong Kong	2nd	100 m	10.53	
1994	Taiwan Athletics Open	Taipei, Taiwan	1st	100 m	10.42	
1994	Flash Athletic Club Track & Field Championships	Singapore	1st	100 m	10.2 (ht)	
1994	Bob Hasan Invitational	Jakarta, Indonesia	3rd	100 m	10.43	
1994	Commonwealth Games	Victoria, Canada	18th	100 m	10.41	
1994	Singapore Open Track & Field Championships	Singapore	1st	100 m	10.55	
1994	Indonesia Open Track & Field Championships	Jakarta, Indonesia	1st	100 m	10.48	
1994	Malaysia Open Track & Field Championships	Kuala Lumpur, Malaysia	1st	100 m	10.48	
1994	Asian Games	Hiroshima, Japan	10th	100 m	10.64	

=== Awards ===
- Team of the Year - Singapore Armed Forces Sports Association (SAFSA): 1994
- Sportsman of the Year - Singapore Armed Forces Sports Association (SAFSA): 1994
- Coca Cola / The Sunday Times Sports Stars Monthly Awards: May 1994
- Singapore National Olympic Committee - Meritorious Award: 1993
- Singapore Amateur Athletics Association Most Outstanding Athlete Award: 1992
- Coca Cola / The Sunday Times Sports Stars Monthly Awards: August 1992

== Post-competitive career ==
After his competition career, Hosni moved into coaching part-time before making the switch to full-time coaching in 2016.

=== Coaching Awards ===
- Singapore Coach Medallion - High Performance Coach Category: 2019
