= Philip Sinon =

Seychellois middle-distance runner

Personal information
- Nationality: Seychellois
- Born: 21 September 1963 (age 62) Seychelles
- Height: 178 cm (5 ft 10 in)
- Weight: 62 kg (137 lb)

Sport
- Country: Seychelles
- Sport: Middle-distance running

Philip Sinon is a Seychellois Olympic middle-distance runner. He represented his country in the men's 1500 meters and the men's 800 meters at the 1984 Summer Olympics. His time was a 4:25.80 in the 1500, and a 2:04.89 in the 800 heats.
