= Alvin Daniel =

Trinidad and Tobago sprinter

Personal information
- Nationality: Trinidadian
- Born: 30 August 1969 (age 56) Point Fortin, Trinidad and Tobago
- Height: 188 cm (6 ft 2 in)
- Weight: 75 kg (165 lb)

Sport
- Sport: Track and field
- Event: 400m
Medal record
Representing Trinidad and Tobago
World Indoor Championships
Silver medal – second place	1993 Toronto	4x400m relay
Central American and Caribbean Games
Silver medal – second place	1990 Mexico City	400m

Alvin Daniel (born 30 August 1969) is a retired track and field athlete from Trinidad and Tobago who specialized in the 200 and 400 metres.

He holds one national record, in 4 x 400 metres relay together with Patrick Delice, Neil de Silva and Ian Morris, with 3:01.05 minutes achieved in the heats of the 1992 Summer Olympics.

Daniel won the British AAA Championships title in the 400 metres event at the 1992 AAA Championships.

== International competitions ==
Year	Competition	Venue	Position	Event	Notes
Representing Trinidad and Tobago
1986	World Junior Championships	Athens, Greece	48th (h)	100 m	11.01 (+1.1 m/s)
1986	World Junior Championships	Athens, Greece	27th (h)	200 m	21.94 (-1.3 m/s)
1987	CARIFTA Games (U20)	Port of Spain, Trinidad and Tobago	1st	200 m	20.94
1987	Pan American Games	Havana, Cuba	11th (sf)	200 m	21.41
1990	Commonwealth Games	Auckland, New Zealand	–	400 m	DNF
1990	Commonwealth Games	Auckland, New Zealand	–	4x400 m relay	DQ
1990	Central American and Caribbean Games	Mexico City, Mexico	2nd	400 m	45.58
1991	World Indoor Championships	Seville, Spain	6th	400 m	92.39
1991	World Indoor Championships	Seville, Spain	–	4x400 m relay	DQ
1991	Pan American Games	Havana, Cuba	(h)	400 m	47.17
1991	Pan American Games	Havana, Cuba	4th	4x400 m relay	3:06.91
1992	Olympic Games	Barcelona, Spain	7th	4x400 m relay	3:03.31
1993	World Indoor Championships	Toronto, Canada	15th (h)	400 m	47.56
1993	World Indoor Championships	Toronto, Canada	2nd	4x400 m relay	3:07.02
1995	Pan American Games	Mar del Plata, Argentina	13th (h)	400 m	47.75
1995	World Championships	Gothenburg, Sweden	68th (h)	100 m	10.81
1995	World Championships	Gothenburg, Sweden	22nd (h)	4x100 m relay	40.09
1999	Pan American Games	Winnipeg, Canada	8th (h)	4 x 400 m relay	3:08.28^{1}

^{1}Did not start in the final

Olympic Games
Preceded by Ian Morris	Flagbearer for Trinidad and Tobago; Barcelona 1992	Succeeded by Gene Samuel
