= Manuel Borrega =

Spanish sprinter

Manuel Francisco Borrega Mena (born 7 March 1970 in Caceres, Spain) is a former Spanish sprinter who competed in the men's 100m competition at the 1996 Summer Olympics. He recorded a 10.52, not enough to qualify for the next round past the heats. His personal best is 10.32, set in 1996.
