= Olapade Adeniken =

Nigerian sprinter (born 1969)

Personal information
- Nationality: Nigerian
- Born: 19 August 1969 (age 56) Osogbo, Osun State, Nigeria
- Height: 186 cm (6 ft 1 in)
- Weight: 78 kg (172 lb)

Sport
- Sport: Athletics
- Event: Sprints
- Club: UTEP Miners, El Paso
Medal record
Men's athletics
Representing Nigeria
Olympic Games
Silver medal – second place	1992 Barcelona	4×100 m
World Championships
Silver medal – second place	1997 Athens	4×100 m
African Championships
Gold medal – first place	1988 Annaba	4×100 m
Gold medal – first place	1989 Lagos	200 m
Summer Universiade
Silver medal – second place	1989 Duisburg	100 m

Olapade Charles Adeniken (born 19 August 1969) is a Nigerian former sprinter who specialized in the 100 and 200 metres, and competed at the 1988 Summer Olympics, 1992 Summer Olympics and the 1996 Summer Olympics.

== Biography ==
Adeniken won the silver medal in 4 × 100 m relay at the 1992 Olympic Games in Barcelona, Spain, together with teammates Chidi Imoh, Oluyemi Kayode and Davidson Ezinwa.

He was the first Nigerian sprinter to break the 10-second barrier in the 100 metres;his personal best time was 9.95 seconds, achieved in April 1994 in El Paso. This ranks him third in Nigeria, only behind Olusoji Fasuba (9.85 s) and Davidson Ezinwa (9.94 s). In 200 metres his personal best time was 20.11 seconds, achieved in June 1992 in Austin. This ranks him third in Nigeria, only behind Francis Obikwelu and Daniel Effiong, and fifth in Africa, behind Frankie Fredericks, Obikwelu, Stéphan Buckland and Effiong.

Adeniken finished second behind John Regis in the 200 metres event at the British 1990 AAA Championships.

Adeniken was an NCAA champion sprinter for the UTEP Miners track and field team, winning the 100 m and 200 m at the 1992 NCAA Division I Outdoor Track and Field Championships.

== Achievements ==
Year	Competition	Venue	Position	Event	Notes
Representing Nigeria
1988	World Junior Championships	Sudbury, Canada	4th	100 m	10.40 (wind: -2.8 m/s)
1988	World Junior Championships	Sudbury, Canada	2nd	200 m	20.88 w (wind: +4.2 m/s)
1988	World Junior Championships	Sudbury, Canada	2nd	4 × 100 m relay	39.66
1989	Universiade	Duisburg, West Germany	2nd	100 m	10.35
1991	World Championships	Tokyo, Japan	5th	200 m	20.51
1992	Olympic Games	Barcelona, Spain	6th	100 m	10.12
1992	Olympic Games	Barcelona, Spain	5th	200 m	20.50
1992	Olympic Games	Barcelona, Spain	2nd	4 × 100 m relay	37.98
1994	Commonwealth Games	Victoria, Canada	6th	100 m	10.11
1995	World Championships	Gothenburg, Sweden	7th	100 m	10.20
1997	World Championships	Athens, Greece	2nd	4 × 100 m relay	38.07

=== Track records ===
As of 6 September 2024, Adenkien holds the following track records for 100 metres and 200 metres.

==== 100 metres ====
Location	Time	Windspeed m/s	Date
Sestriere	9.92	+2.8	29/07/1995

==== 200 metres ====
Location	Time	Windspeed m/s	Date
Colorado Springs, Colorado	20.00	+3.4	23/05/1992
