= John Hou =

Papua New Guinean sprinter

Personal information
- Nationality: Papua New Guinean
- Born: 25 September 1968 (age 57)

Sport
- Sport: Sprinting
- Event: 100 metres

John Hou (born 25 September 1968) is a Papua New Guinean sprinter. He competed in the men's 100 metres at the 1988 Summer Olympics.
