= Camera Ntereke =

Botswana sprinter

Personal information
- Nationality: Botswana
- Born: 5 May 1964 (age 62)

Sport
- Sport: Sprinting
- Event: 400 metres

Camera Ntereke (born 5 May 1964) is a Botswana sprinter. He competed in the men's 400 metres at the 1992 Summer Olympics.
