= Kennedy Ondiek =

Kenyan sprinter

Kennedy Ondiek (December 12, 1966 – July 14, 2011) was a Kenyan runner, who specialised in sprinting. He competed at the Olympics and World Championships.

Ondiek participated in three events the 1988 Olympic Games. He reached the quarterfinals (second round) in the 100 and the 200 metres races. In the 4×100 metres relay race he was part of the Kenyan team that reached semifinals. Other runners in the team were Peter Wekesa, Simeon Kipkemboi and Elkana Nyang'au.

He finished 8th at the 1990 Commonwealth Games 200 metres race. He reached 200 metres quarterfinals at the 1991 World Championships.

At the 1992 Summer Olympics he competed in 100 and 200 metres races, reaching quarterfinals in the latter. Year later, at the 1993 World Championships he reached 200 quarter-finals again. He competed at the 1994 Commonwealth Games, but did advance to finals.

He also won several Kenyan championships and won the 100 metres at the 1988 East and Central African Championships.
