= Bertram Haynes =

Saint Kitts and Nevis athlete (born 1968)

Bertram Eric Haynes (born 4 July 1968) is a retired Saint Kitts and Nevis athlete.

He was part of the first ever team to represent Saint Kitts and Nevis at the Olympic Games when he competed at the 1996 Summer Olympic Games in the 4 x 100 metres relay, the relay team finished four in their heat so didn't advance to the next round.
