= Kevin Braunskill =

American sprinter

Personal information
- Nationality: American
- Born: March 31, 1969 (age 57) Suffolk County, New York, United States
- Education: MBA Webster University; North Carolina State University
- Occupations: Assistant Men’s Track and Field Coach
- Years active: 2013-present
- Employer: Delaware State University
- Spouse: Shantal Braunskill
- Children: Kevin Jr and Chelsea

Sport
- Sport: sprinter
- University team: North Carolina State
Medal record
Representing United States
Summer Universiade
Bronze medal – third place	1989 Duisburg	200m

Kevin Braunskill (born March 31, 1969) is an American former sprinter. A graduate of North Carolina State University, Braunskill is an 11x NCAA D1 All-American, World Junior champion, World Cup champion, Pan American Champion all at 200m. He was also a 10x USA National championships finalist in the event with a best time of 20.01 and highest world ranking of 6.

== Athletics career and controversy ==
Braunskill received a four year suspension after he tested positive for a performance-enhancing substance at the New York Games on May 22, 1994. USA Track and Field exonerated Braunskill of any wrongdoing, but the suspension came from the International Amateur Athletic Federation (IAFF) and effected his European competitions. Remarkably, Braunskill never lost his Home Depot or Champion Apparel sponsors. In fact, he used this platform to travel more than any other track and field athlete. He donated 100% of his appearance fees to local organizations supporting children near the competition site. He continued competing until 2004.

== Career ==
Braunskill started out in track and field for Riverhead High School. In 1994, Braunskill was ranked one of the top in the World List for the 200m by Track and Field News. He had a successful college career at North Carolina State and received six outdoor all-American honours and four indoor honours.

Braunskill was a Captain and a Bronze Star decorated retired US Army Officer. He joined the coaching team at Delaware State University as Assistant Men’s Track and Field Coach in August 2013.

== Family life ==
Braunskill is married to Shantal Braunskill of Cape Town, South Africa and they have two children, Kevin Jr. and Chelsea. His cousin is Carl Smith, who was a headline performer for the Blue Waves team at Riverhead High School with him.
