= Marguerite Buist =

New Zealand long-distance runner

Personal information
- Born: 29 December 1962 (age 63) Whanganui, New Zealand

Sport
- Country: New Zealand
- Sport: Long-distance running
- Event: Marathon

Marguerite Gay Buist (born 29 December 1962) is a New Zealand long-distance runner. She competed in the women's marathon at the 1992 Summer Olympics.

In 1990, Buist was awarded the New Zealand 1990 Commemoration Medal.
