= Pascal Théophile =

French sprinter

Pascal Théophile (born 22 February 1970 in Pointe-a-Pitre, Guadeloupe) is a former French athlete who specialised in the 100 meters. Theophile competed at the 1996 Summer Olympics where he reached the quarter-finals of the 100 meters and the final of the 4 × 100 metres relay. His personal best in the individual event, 10.21, was set in 1995, although he ran a wind-assisted 10.13 the following year.
