= Joseph Adam (athlete) =

Seychellois sprinter

Personal information
- Nationality: Seychellois
- Born: 1 May 1965 (age 61)

Sport
- Sport: Sprinting
- Event: 400 metres

Joseph Adam (born 1 May 1965) is a Seychellois sprinter. He competed in the men's 400 metres at the 1992 Summer Olympics, ranking 6th.
