= Joseph Gikonyo =

Kenyan sprinter

Medal record

Men's athletics

Representing Kenya

African Championships
| Gold medal – first place | 1990 Cairo | 100 m |
| Gold medal – first place | 1990 Cairo | 200 m |

Joseph Gìkonyo Mūkinyi (born 7 February 1965) is a former Kenyan athlete who competed in the 100 and 200 metres. He was the Kenyan record holder in both distances with 10.28 seconds and 20.43 seconds respectively. The 100 metres national record has since been broken by Tom Musinde, who ran 10.26 at the 2007 All-Africa Games He also competed in the men's 200 metres at the 1996 Summer Olympics.

In 2002, Gìkonyo was described as a semi-retired athlete.

== Achievements ==
- 1995 All-Africa Games - bronze medal (200 m)
- 1990 African Championships - gold medal (100 m)
- 1990 African Championships - gold medal (200 m)
