= Anvar Kuchmuradov =

Uzbekistani sprinter

Medal record

Men's athletics

Representing Uzbekistan

Asian Championships
Silver medal – second place	1995 Jakarta	Individual

Anvar Khatamovich Kuchmuradov (Uzbek: Анвар Хатамович Кучмурадов; born 5 January 1970) is a former Uzbekistani sprinter who competed in the men's 100m competition at the 1996 Summer Olympics. He recorded a 10.71, not enough to qualify for the next round past the heats. His personal best is 9.90, set in 1994. In the 2000 Summer Olympics, he was on the Uzbekistani 4 × 100 m relay team, which placed 8th in their heat with a 41.20.
