= Simeon Kipkemboi =

Kenyan sprinter

Personal information
- Born: 15 April 1960 (age 66) Kenya
Medal record
Men's athletics
Representing Kenya
All-Africa Games
Gold medal – first place	1987 Nairobi	200 m
African Championships
Gold medal – first place	1985 Cairo	200 m
Gold medal – first place	1993 Durban	4×400 m
Silver medal – second place	1985 Cairo	4×100 m
Silver medal – second place	1989 Lagos	400 m

Simeon Kipkemboi (born 15 April 1960) is a former sprinter from Kenya, who represented his native East African country twice at the Summer Olympics: in 1988 and 1992. He is best known for winning the gold medal in the men's 200 metres at the 1987 All-Africa Games.

== Personal bests ==
- 100 metres – 10.2 (1989)
- 200 metres – 20.54 (1987)
- 400 metres – 44.93 (1990)
