= Sven Matthes =

German sprinter (born 1969)

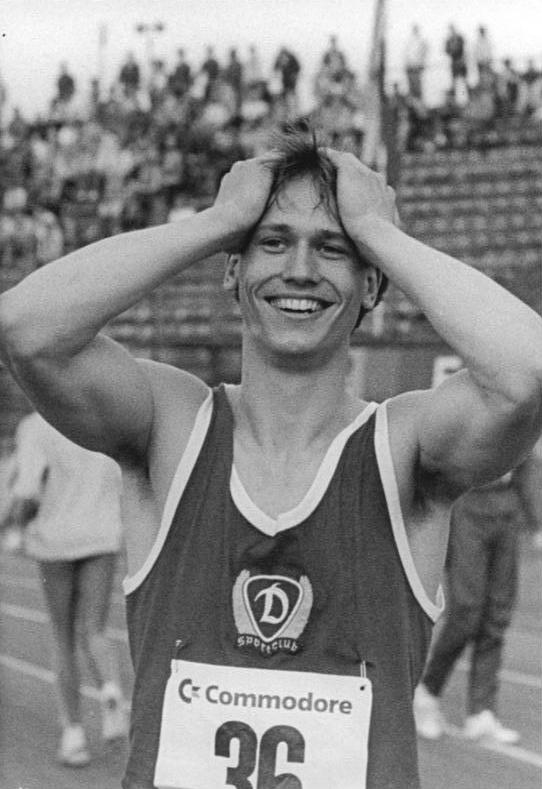

Medal record

Men's athletics

Representing East Germany

World Junior Championships
Silver medal – second place	1988 Sudbury	100 m

Sven Matthes (born 23 August 1969) was a German sprinter who held the World Junior Record in 60 metres for 13 years between 1988 and 2001 with a time of 6.53 seconds.

== Biography ==
Matthes, who was born in East Germany, also received a bronze medal in 100 metres in the European Junior Championships in Birmingham, England in 1987 with a time of 10.47 seconds. He improved his time to 10.11 seconds in Rostock on 22 June 1989 and holds a spot in European Under-23 All Time List with this performance.

== See also ==
- German all-time top lists - 100 metres
