= Darren Braithwaite =

British sprinter (born 1969)

Personal information
- Nationality: British (English)
- Born: 20 January 1969 (age 57) London, England
- Height: 188 cm (6 ft 2 in)
- Weight: 85 kg (187 lb)

Sport
- Sport: Athletics
- Event: Sprints
- Club: Haringey AC
Medal record
Men's athletics
Representing Great Britain
World Championships
Bronze medal – third place	1991 Tokyo	4×100 m
Bronze medal – third place	1997 Athens	4×100 m
European Championships
Silver medal – second place	1990 Split	4×100 m

Darren Devere Braithwaite (born 20 January 1969) is a British former sprinter who competed at the 1996 Summer Olympics.

== Biography ==
Braithwaite was a member of the British team which set a world indoor record for the rarely contested 4×200 metres relay on 3 March 1991 in Glasgow. Braithwaite and his teammates Linford Christie, Ade Mafe and John Regis ran a time of 1:22.11, which has yet to be bettered.

Braithwaite won a bronze medal in the 4×100 metres relay event at the 1991 World Athletics Championships in Tokyo (together with Tony Jarrett, John Regis and Linford Christie). He repeated this achievement at the 1997 World Athletics Championships in Athens (together with Darren Campbell, Douglas Walker and Julian Golding).

He became the British 100 metres champion after winning the British AAA Championships title at the 1995 AAA Championships.

Braithwaite now teaches physical education at Lammas School and Sports College in Leyton, and coaches the likes of Jordon Roberts. His brother, Leon Braithwaite, is a former professional footballer, who played for Exeter City in the 1990s.
