= Fabian Muyaba =

Zimbabwean sprinter

Fabian Kabwe Muyaba (born 30 September 1970) is a former Zimbabwean sprinter who competed in the men's 100m competition at the 1992 Summer Olympics. He recorded a 10.84, not enough to qualify for the next round past the heats. His personal best is 10.15, set in 1991. In the 1988 Summer Olympics, he competed in both the 100m and 200m contests, scoring a 10.75 and 21.66, respectively. Fabian took the Zimbabwean 100m record for almost 17 years which was then broken by Gabriel Mvumvure in the mid 2000s. He was then named 14th fastest in the world, one of the fastest man in Zimbabwean history and the second black Zimbabwean after Artwell Mandaza to represent the country at the Common-Wealth Games and Olympics respectively.

Running for the LSU Tigers track and field team, Muyaba won the 4 × 100 m relay at the 1993 and 1994 NCAA Division I Outdoor Track and Field Championships. In 2009, Muyaba was sentenced to ten years in prison for defrauding the United States government.
