= Jamie Henderson (sprinter) =

Scottish athlete (born 1969)

Personal information
- Born: Jamie Alexander Henderson; 28 March 1969 (age 57)

Sport
- Sport: Athletics
- Event: Sprinting
Medal record
Representing Scotland
Commonwealth Games
Bronze medal – third place	1986 Edinburgh	4x100 m relay
Representing Great Britain
World Junior Championships
Gold medal – first place	1986 Athens	4×100 m relay
Bronze medal – third place	1986 Athens	100 m
Bronze medal – third place	1988 Sudbury	4×100 m relay

Jamie Alexander Henderson (born 28 March 1969) is a Scottish former athlete who competed as a sprinter.

A former Edinburgh Academy pupil, Henderson was coached by Bob Inglis. He won the UK Athletics Championships 100 metres title in 1986 and became the youngest ever champion for that event. As a teenager he had further success with a third-place finish in the 100 metres at the 1986 World Junior Championships in Athens and was 100 metres champion at the 1987 European Junior Championships, running a personal best of 10.21 seconds for the latter.

Henderson represented Scotland in three editions of the Commonwealth Games, debuting in the 1986 Edinburgh games, where he was a 100 metres finalist and claimed a bronze with the 4×100 m relay team.
