= Davidson Ezinwa =

Nigerian sprinter (born 1971)

Personal information
- Nationality: Nigerian
- Born: 22 November 1971 (age 54)
- Height: 184 cm (6 ft 0 in)
- Weight: 82 kg (181 lb)

Sport
- Sport: Running

Achievements and titles
- Personal bests: 100 m: 9.94; 200 m: 20.30
Medal record
Men's athletics
Representing Nigeria
Olympic Games
Silver medal – second place	1992 Barcelona	4x100 m relay
World Championships
Silver medal – second place	1997 Athens	4x100 m relay
All-Africa Games
Gold medal – first place	1995 Harare	100 m
African Championships
Gold medal – first place	1988 Annaba	200 m
Gold medal – first place	1988 Annaba	4×100 m
Silver medal – second place	1989 Lagos	200 m
World Junior Championships
Gold medal – first place	1990 Plovdiv	100 m
Silver medal – second place	1990 Plovdiv	200 m
Bronze medal – third place	1990 Plovdiv	4x100 m relay
Commonwealth Games
Silver medal – second place	1990 Auckland	100 m

Davidson Ezinwa (born 22 November 1971) is a former sprinter from Nigeria.

He won a silver medal at the 1992 Summer Olympics as well as a silver medal at the 1997 World Championships, both in 4 x 100 metres relay. He also won a 60 metres silver medal at the 1997 World Indoor Championships.

In 100 metres his personal best time is 9.94 seconds, although he has recorded 9.91 s, albeit with a doubtful wind reading of -2.3 m/s which is an unlikely weather condition for records. In any case his result ranks him second in Nigeria, behind Olusoji Fasuba, and fifth in Africa, behind Ferdinand Omanyala, Akani Simbine, Fasuba and Frankie Fredericks. His personal best 200 metres time is 20.30 seconds, from 1990.

Ezinwa established a new World junior record in the 100-meter dash in 1990 (10.05), breaking Stanley Floyd's ten-year-old record (10.07). Ezinwa's record was not broken until 2003, when Darrel Brown ran a 10.01 100-meter dash.

Ezinwa served two suspensions for testing positive for doping: three months for ephedrine in February 1996, and two years for hCG in 1999.

Davidson Ezinwa's identical twin brother, Osmond Ezinwa, was also a sprinter. Both brothers attended the Christian university Azusa Pacific University.
