= Athletics at the 1988 Summer Olympics – Men's 4 × 100 metres relay =

Men's 4 × 100 metres relay at the Games of the XXIV Olympiad
- Venue: Seoul Olympic Stadium
- Dates: 30 September 1988 (heats); 1 October 1988 (semi-finals and final)
- Competitors: 126 from 29 nations
- Teams: 29
- Winning time: 38.19

Medalists
| 1st place, gold medalist(s) | | Soviet Union |
| 2nd place, silver medalist(s) | | Great Britain |
| 3rd place, bronze medalist(s) | | France |

These are the official results of the 4 × 100 metres relay event at the 1988 Summer Olympics in Seoul, South Korea. There were a total number of 29 nations competing.

U.S. team who was defending the gold medal won in Los Angeles was favored to win the event, but fumbled an exchange in a heat and was disqualified.

A French team, including three members of the bronze medal-winning team here, would claim the world record two years later.

== Medalists ==
| Gold | Silver | Bronze |
|---|---|---|
| Soviet Union; Viktor Bryzhin; Vladimir Krylov; Vladimir Muravyov; Vitaliy Savin | Great Britain; Elliot Bunney; Linford Christie; Mike McFarlane; John Regis | France; Bruno Marie-Rose; Max Morinière; Gilles Quénéhervé; Daniel Sangouma |

== Records ==
These were the standing World and Olympic records (in seconds) prior to the 1988 Summer Olympics.

| World record | 37.83 | (United States) Sam Graddy (United States) Ron Brown (United States) Calvin Smith (United States) Carl Lewis | Los Angeles (USA) | August 11, 1984 |
| Olympic record | 37.83 | (United States) Sam Graddy (United States) Ron Brown (United States) Calvin Smith (United States) Carl Lewis | Los Angeles (USA) | August 11, 1984 |

== Final ==
- Held on Saturday October 1, 1988

| RANK | NATION | ATHLETES | TIME |
|---|---|---|---|
| | Soviet Union | • Viktor Bryzhin • Vladimir Krylov • Vladimir Muravyov • Vitaliy Savin | 38.19 |
| | Great Britain | • Elliot Bunney • John Regis • Mike McFarlane • Linford Christie | 38.28 |
| | France | • Bruno Marie-Rose • Daniel Sangouma • Gilles Quénéhervé • Max Morinière | 38.40 |
| 4. | Jamaica | • Christopher Faulknor • Gregory Meghoo • Clive Wright • John Mair | 38.47 |
| 5. | Italy | • Ezio Madonia • Sandro Floris • Pierfrancesco Pavoni • Stefano Tilli | 38.54 |
| 6. | West Germany | • Fritz Heer • Christian Haas • Peter Klein • Dirk Schweisfurth | 38.55 |
| 7. | Canada | • Desai Williams • Atlee Mahorn • Cyprian Enweani • Brian Morrison | 38.93 |
| 8. | Hungary | • György Bakos • Laszlo Karaffa • István Tatar • Attila Kovács | 39.19 |

== Semifinals ==
=== Heat 1 ===
| RANK | NATION | ATHLETES | TIME |
|---|---|---|---|
| 1. | France | • Bruno Marie-Rose • Daniel Sangouma • Gilles Queneherve • Max Moriniere | 38.49 |
| 2. | Great Britain | • Elliot Bunney • John Regis • Mike McFarlane • Linford Christie | 38.52 |
| 3. | Jamaica | • Christopher Faulknor • Gregory Meghoo • Clive Wright • John Mair | 38.75 |
| 4. | West Germany | • Fritz Heer • Christian Haas • Peter Klein • Dirk Schweisfurth | 38.75 |
| 5. | Japan | • Shinji Aoto • Kenji Yamauchi • Koji Kurihara • Susumu Takano | 38.90 |
| 6. | Nigeria | • Victor Edet • Olapade Adeniken • Isiaq Adeyanju • Olatunji Olobia | 39.05 |
| 7. | South Korea | • Nak-Kun Sung • Duk-Sup Shim • Bock-Sup Kim • Jae-Keun Chang | 39.05 |
| 8. | Qatar | • Rashid Marzouq S. M. Al-Abdulla • Faraj Marzouqs. Abdulla • Saad Muftahmubarak • Talal Mansoor | 41.19 |

=== Heat 2 ===
| RANK | NATION | ATHLETES | TIME |
|---|---|---|---|
| 1. | Soviet Union | • Viktor Bryzhin • Vladimir Krylov • Vladimir Muravyov • Vitaliy Savin | 38.55 |
| 2. | Italy | • Ezio Madonia • Sandro Floris • Pierfrancesco Pavoni • Stefano Tilli | 38.65 |
| 3. | Hungary | • György Bakos • Laszlo Karaffa • István Tatar • Attila Kovács | 38.84 |
| 4. | Canada | • Andrew Mowatt • Atlee Mahorn • Desai Williams • Brian Morrison | 38.94 |
| 5. | Ghana | • John Myles-Mills • Eric Akogyiram • Salaam Gariba • Nelson Boateng | 39.46 |
| 6. | Kenya | • Elkana Nyang'au • Kennedy Ondiek • Simon Kipkemboi • Peter Wekesa | 39.47 |
| — | China | • Tao Li • Jianming Cai • Feng Li • Chen Zheng | DNF |
| — | Portugal | • Arnaldo Abrantes • Pedro Curvelo • Pedro Agostinho • Luis Barroso | DSQ |

== Qualifying heats ==
=== Heat 1 ===
| RANK | NATION | ATHLETES | TIME |
|---|---|---|---|
| 1. | France | • Bruno Marie-Rose • Daniel Sangouma • Gilles Queneherve • Max Moriniere | 38.87 |
| 2. | Nigeria | • Victor Edet • Davison Ezinwa • Abdullahi Tetengi • Olatunji Olobia | 39.15 |
| 3. | Italy | • Ezio Madonia • Sandro Floris • Pierfrancesco Pavoni • Stefano Tilli | 39.20 |
| 4. | South Korea | • Seong Nak-gun • Sim Deok-seop • Kim Bok-seop • Jang Jae-geun | 39.61 |
| 5. | Chinese Taipei | • Cheng Hsin-Fu • Lee Shiunn-Long • Nai Hui-Fang • Wu Chin-jing | 40.40 |
| 6. | Uganda | • Moses Musonge • Joseph Ssali • John Goville • Mike Okot | 41.39 |
| 7. | Maldives | • Ismail Asif Waheed • Ibrahim Manik • Abdul Razzak Aboobakur • Mohamed Hanim | 44.31 |

=== Heat 2 ===
| RANK | NATION | ATHLETES | TIME |
|---|---|---|---|
| 1. | Soviet Union | • Viktor Bryzhin • Vladimir Krylov • Vladimir Muravyov • Vitaliy Savin | 38.82 |
| 2. | West Germany | • Fritz Heer • Christian Haas • Peter Klein • Dirk Schweisfurth | 39.01 |
| 3. | Ghana | • John Myles-Mills • Eric Akogyiram • Salaam Gariba • Nelson Boateng | 39.13 |
| 4. | China | • Tao Li • Jianming Cai • Feng Li • Chen Zheng | 39.67 |
| 5. | Qatar | • Rashid Sheban Marzouk • Faraj Marzouqs. Abdulla • Saad Muftahmubarak • Talal Mansoor | 40.05 |
| 6. | Republic of the Congo | • Armand Biniakounou • Hygien-Nicaise Lombocko • Henri Ndinga • Pierre Ndinga | 41.26 |
| — | Senegal | • Joseph Diaz • Amadou M'Baye • Babacar Pouye • Ibrahima Tamba | DSQ |
| — | Indonesia | • Mardi Lestari • Kresno Eko Pambudi • Elieser Wattebosi • Mohamed Yusuf | DNF |

=== Heat 3 ===
| RANK | NATION | ATHLETES | TIME |
|---|---|---|---|
| 1. | Canada | • Andrew Mowatt • Atlee Mahorn • Desai Williams • Brian Morrison | 39.41 |
| 2. | Jamaica | • Christopher Faulknor • Gregory Meghoo • Clive Wright • John Mair | 39.53 |
| 3. | Japan | • Kaoru Matsubara • Shinji Aoto • Koji Kurihara • Takahiro Kasahara | 39.70 |
| 4. | Kenya | • Elkana Nyang'au • Kennedy Ondiek • Simon Kipkemboi • Peter Wekesa | 40.30 |
| 5. | Thailand | • Supas Tiprod • Visut Watanasin • Anuwat Sermsiri • Chainarong Wangganon | 40.57 |
| 6. | Antigua and Barbuda | • St. Clair Soleyne • Alfred Browne • Howard Lindsay • Larry Millers | 41.18 |
| 7. | Sierra Leone | • Francis Keita • Horace Dove-Edwin • Benjamin Grant • Felix Sandy | 41.19 |
| — | Spain | • Florencio Gascón • Enrique Talavera • Valentín Rocandio • José Javier Arqués | DNF |

=== Heat 4 ===
| RANK | NATION | ATHLETES | TIME |
|---|---|---|---|
| 1. | Hungary | • György Bakos • László Karaffa • István Tatár • Attila Kovács | 39.12 |
| 2. | Great Britain | • Elliot Bunney • John Regis • Mike McFarlane • Linford Christie | 39.17 |
| 3. | Portugal | • Arnaldo Abrantes • Pedro Curvelo • Pedro Agostinho • Luis Barroso | 39.61 |
| 4. | Mexico | • Herman Adam • Eduardo Nava • Antonio Ruíz • Miguel Elizondo | 40.31 |
| 5. | Benin | • Fortune Ogouchi • Patrice Mahoulikponto • Dossou Vignissy • Issa Alassane-Ousséni | 41.52 |
| 6. | Bangladesh | • Mohamed Shah Alam • Shahanuddin Choudhury • Mohamed Hossain Milzer • Mohamed Shah Jalal | 41.78 |
| — | United States | • Dennis Mitchell • Albert Robinson • Calvin Smith • Lee McNeill | DSQ |

== See also ==
- 1986 Men's European Championships 4 × 100 m Relay (Stuttgart)
- 1987 Men's World Championships 4 × 100 m Relay (Rome)
- 1990 Men's European Championships 4 × 100 m Relay (Split)
- 1991 Men's World Championships 4 × 100 m Relay (Tokyo)
