= 1987 World Championships in Athletics – Men's 4 × 100 metres relay =

The 4 × 100 metres relay at the 1987 World Championships in Athletics was held at the Stadio Olimpico on September 5 and September 6.

== Medals ==
Gold:	Silver:	Bronze:
United States; Lee McRae; Lee McNeill; Harvey Glance; Carl Lewis; Dennis Mitchell*	Soviet Union; Aleksandr Yevgenyev; Viktor Bryzgin; Vladimir Muravyov; Vladimir Krylov; Andrey Fedoriv*	Jamaica; John Mair; Andrew Smith; Clive Wright; Ray Stewart; Greg Meghoo*

Note: * Indicates athletes who ran in preliminary rounds.

== Records ==
Existing records at the start of the event.

World Record	United States (USA)	37.83	Los Angeles, USA	August 11, 1984
Championship Record	United States (USA)	37.86	Helsinki, Finland	August 10, 1983

== Results ==
All times shown are in seconds.

AR area record | CR championship record | GR games record | NR national record | OR Olympic record | PB personal best | SB season best | WL world leading (in a given season)
DNS = did not start | DQ = disqualification | NM = no mark (i.e. no valid result) | Q = qualification by place in heat | q = qualification by overall place

=== Final ===
Rank	Team	Name	Result	Notes
Gold medal	United States	Lee McRae, Lee McNeill, Harvey Glance, Carl Lewis	37.90	
Silver medal	Soviet Union	Aleksandr Yevgenyev, Viktor Bryzgin, Vladimir Muravyov, Vladimir Krylov	38.02	AR
Bronze medal	Jamaica	John Mair, Andrew Smith, Clive Wright, Ray Stewart	38.41	
4	Canada	Ben Johnson, Atlee Mahorn, Desai Williams, Mike Dwyer)	38.47	
5	West Germany	Fritz Heer, Volker Westhagemann, Christian Haas, Norbert Dobeleit)	38.73	
6	Hungary	István Nagy, László Karaffa, István Tatár, Attila Kovács	39.04	
7	Italy	Ezio Madonia, Domenico Gorla, Paolo Catalano, Pierfrancesco Pavoni	39.62	
8	China	Li Tao, Cai Jianming, Li Feng, Zheng Chen	39.93	

=== Semi-finals ===
==== Heat 1 ====
Rank	Team	Name	Result	Notes
1	Soviet Union	Aleksandr Yevgenyev, Viktor Bryzgin, Vladimir Muravyov, Vladimir Krylov	38.29	Q
2	Canada	Ben Johnson, Atlee Mahorn, Desai Williams, Mike Dwyer	38.50	Q
3	West Germany	Fritz Heer, Volker Westhagemann, Christian Haas, Norbert Dobeleit	38.84	Q
4	Italy	Ezio Madonia, Stefano Tilli, Paolo Catalano, Pierfrancesco Pavoni	39.52	Q
5	Japan	Kaoru Matsubara, Hirohisa Ota, Masahiro Nagura, Hiroki Fuwa	39.71	
6	Spain	Miguel Ángel García, Juan José Prado, Angel Heras, José Javier Arqués	39.74	
7	Ghana	John Myles-Mills, Emmanuel Tuffour, Salaam Gariba, Eric Akogyiram	39.94	
8	Senegal	Charles-Louis Seck, Hamidou Diawara, Joseph Dias, Amadou Mbaye	40.22	

==== Heat 2 ====
Rank	Team	Name	Result	Notes
1	United States	Lee McRae, Lee McNeill, Harvey Glance, Dennis Mitchell	38.33	Q
2	Jamaica	John Mair, Andrew Smith, Clive Wright, Ray Stewart	38.66	Q
3	Hungary	István Nagy, László Karaffa, István Tatár, Attila Kovács	38.78	Q
4	China	Li Tao, Cai Jianming, Li Feng, Zheng Chen	39.05	AR Q
5	Cuba	Ricardo Chacon, Leandro Peñalver, Sergio Querol, Andrés Simón	39.08	
6	Brazil	Joilto Bonfim, Carlos de Oliveira, Arnaldo de Oliveira Silva, Robson da Silva	39.22	
7	Chinese Taipei	Lai Cheng-Chuan, Lee Shiun-Long, Chang Yih-Yuan, Cheng Hsin-Fu	39.90	
8	Portugal	Arnaldo Abrantes, Pedro Curvelo, Luís Cunha, Luís Barroso	40.24	

=== Heats ===
==== Heat 1 ====
Rank	Country	Name	Result	Notes
1	United States	Lee McRae, Lee McNeill, Harvey Glance, Dennis Mitchell	38.80	Q
2	Hungary	István Nagy, László Karaffa, István Tatár, Attila Kovács	39.11	Q
3	Japan	Kaoru Matsubara, Hirohisa Ota, Masahiro Nagura, Hiroki Fuwa	39.49	Q
4	China	Li Tao, Cai Jianming, Li Feng, Zheng Chen	39.63	Q
5	Spain	Enrique Talavera, Juan José Prado, Miguel Ángel García, José Javier Arqués	40.20	q
6	Uganda	Moses Musonge, Joseph Ssali, Sunday Olweny, Edward Bitoga	40.22	
**	Great Britain	Lincoln Asquith, John Regis, Mike McFarlane, Clarence Callender	DQ	

==== Heat 2 ====
Rank	Country	Name	Result	Notes
1	Soviet Union	Aleksandr Yevgenyev, Viktor Bryzgin, Vladimir Muravyov, Andrey Fedoriv	38.98	Q
2	West Germany	Fritz Heer, Volker Westhagemann, Christian Haas, Norbert Dobeleit	39.10	Q
3	Brazil	Joilto Bonfim, Carlos de Oliveira, Arnaldo de Oliveira Silva, Robson da Silva	39.57	Q
4	Italy	Ezio Madonia, Stefano Tilli, Paolo Catalano, Pierfrancesco Pavoni	39.58	Q
5	Ghana	John Myles-Mills, Emmanuel Tuffour, Salaam Gariba, Eric Akogyiram	39.77	q
6	Chinese Taipei	Lai Cheng-Chuan, Lee Shiun-Long, Chang Yih-Yuan, Cheng Hsin-Fu	40.05	q

==== Heat 3 ====
Rank	Team	Name	Result	Notes
1	Canada	Ben Johnson, Atlee Mahorn, Desai Williams, Mike Dwyer	38.76	Q
2	Jamaica	John Mair, Andrew Smith, Greg Meghoo, Clive Wright (Note: Though World Athletics lists Jamaica's heat runners as Mair, Smith, Wright, and Stewart, contemporary reports and other records list their first-round team as Mair, Smith, Meghoo, and Wright.)	38.88	Q
3	Cuba	Ricardo Chacon, Leandro Peñalver, Sergio Querol, Andrés Simón	39.44	Q
4	Senegal	Charles-Louis Seck, Hamidou Diawara, Joseph Dias, Amadou Mbaye	39.83	Q
5	Portugal	Arnaldo Abrantes, Pedro Curvelo, Luís Cunha, Luís Barroso	40.10	q
**	Nigeria	Augustine Olobia, Patrick Nwankwo, Innocent Egbunike, Chidi Imoh	DNS	
