= 1987 World Championships in Athletics – Men's 100 metres =

Men's 100 metres at the 1987 IAAF World Championships
- Venue: Stadio Olimpico
- Dates: 29 August (heats and quarter-finals); 30 August (semi-finals and final)
- Competitors: 56
- Winning time: 9.93 WR

Medalists
gold medal	Carl Lewis	United States
silver medal	Ray Stewart	Jamaica
bronze medal	Linford Christie	Great Britain

These are the official results of the Men's 100 metres event at the 1987 IAAF World Championships in Rome, Italy. There were a total number of 56 participating athletes, with seven qualifying heats and the final held on Sunday 30 August 1987.

Ben Johnson of Canada initially won the final in a world record time of 9.83 seconds, but he was disqualified by the IAAF on 30 September 1989 after he admitted to the use of performance-enhancing drugs between 1981 and 1988.

== Records ==
Existing records at the start of the event.

World Record	Calvin Smith (USA)	9.93	Colorado Springs, USA	July 3, 1983
Championship Record	Carl Lewis (USA)	10.07	Helsinki, Finland	August 8, 1983

== Results ==
=== Qualifying heats ===
Held on 29 August 1987. The first 4 athletes in each heat (Q) and the next 4 fastest (q) qualified to the quarter-finals.

==== Heat 1 ====
Rank	Athlete	Nation	Time	Notes
1	Raymond Stewart	Jamaica	10.23	Q
2	Ronald Desruelles	Belgium	10.39	Q
3	Mike McFarlane	Great Britain	10.39	Q
4	Cheng Hsin-fu	Chinese Taipei	10.41	Q
5	Mark Witherspoon	United States	10.65	
6	Leandro Peñalver	Cuba	10.65	
7	Earl Hazel	Saint Kitts and Nevis	10.96	
8	Robert Loua	Guinea	11.09	
			Wind: +1.8 m/s	

==== Heat 2 ====
Rank	Athlete	Nation	Time	Notes
1	Max Morinière	France	10.29	Q
2	Aleksandr Yevgenyev	Soviet Union	10.33	Q
3	Andrés Simón	Cuba	10.34	Q
4	Lee McRae	United States	10.34	Q
5	Christian Haas	West Germany	10.39	q
6	Oussen Issa Allassane	Benin	10.68	
7	Ziad Hanna	Lebanon	11.04	
8	Amawi Mohd Eid Ismail	Palestine	11.56	
			Wind: +1.3 m/s	

==== Heat 3 ====
Rank	Athlete	Nation	Time	Notes
1	Robson da Silva	Brazil	10.42	Q
2	Achmed de Kom	Netherlands	10.49	Q
3	Vladimir Muravyov	Soviet Union	10.53	Q
4	Harouna Pale	Burkina Faso	10.68	Q
5	Théophile Nkounkou	Republic of the Congo	10.89	
—	Allan Wells	Great Britain	DNS	
—	Greg Barnes	United States Virgin Islands	DNS	
—	Youssouf Ali	Comoros	DNS	
			Wind: +0.4 m/s	

==== Heat 4 ====
Rank	Athlete	Nation	Time	Notes
1	Pierfrancesco Pavoni	Italy	10.24	Q
2	Viktor Bryzgin	Soviet Union	10.25	Q
3	Linford Christie	Great Britain	10.29	Q
4	Hiroki Fuwa	Japan	10.43	Q
5	Li Tao	China	10.52	
6	Julien Thode	Netherlands Antilles	10.69	
7	Óscar Fernández	Peru	11.04	
8	Alan Zammit	Malta	11.32	
			Wind: +1.6 m/s	

==== Heat 5 ====
Rank	Athlete	Nation	Time	Notes
1	~~Ben Johnson~~	~~Canada~~	~~10.24~~	Q
2	Andrew Smith	Jamaica	10.39	Q
3	José Javier Arqués	Spain	10.41	Q
4	Charles-Louis Seck	Senegal	10.43	Q
5	Patrick Nwankwo	Nigeria	10.43	q
6	Mustapha Kamel Selmi	Algeria	10.48	q
7	Rodney Cox	Turks and Caicos Islands	11.18	
8	Gilbert Bessi	Monaco	11.77	
			Wind: +0.6 m/s	

==== Heat 6 ====
Rank	Athlete	Nation	Time	Notes
1	Carl Lewis	United States	10.05	Q
2	Attila Kovács	Hungary	10.26	Q
3	Valentin Atanasov	Bulgaria	10.39	Q
4	Ricardo Chacón	Cuba	10.43	Q
5	Dirk Schweisfurth	West Germany	10.50	
6	Arnaldo Abrantes	Portugal	10.64	
7	Rick Hiram	Nauru	11.37	
—	Trevor Davis	Anguilla	DNS	
			Wind: +1.5 m/s	

==== Heat 7 ====
Rank	Athlete	Nation	Time	Notes
1	Chidi Imoh	Nigeria	10.22	Q
2	Andreas Berger	Austria	10.22	Q
3	Desai Williams	Canada	10.30	Q
4	Eric Akogyiram	Ghana	10.37	Q
5	Joilto Bonfim	Brazil	10.41	q
6	Jerry Jeremiah	Vanuatu	10.81	
7	Ibrahim Mohamed-Waheed	Maldives	11.48	
—	Takale Tuna	Papua New Guinea	DNS	
			Wind: +2.5 m/s	

=== Quarter-finals ===
Held on 29 August 1987. The first 3 athletes in each heat (Q) and the next 4 fastest (q) qualified to the quarter-finals.

==== Heat 1 ====
Rank	Athlete	Nation	Time	Notes
1	Carl Lewis	United States	10.38	Q
2	Linford Christie	Great Britain	10.40	Q
3	Attila Kovács	Hungary	10.52	Q
4	Robson da Silva	Brazil	10.53	
5	Christian Haas	West Germany	10.65	
6	Ronald Desruelles	Belgium	10.69	
7	Ricardo Chacón	Cuba	10.70	
8	Vladimir Muravyov	Soviet Union	10.80	
			Wind: -2.9 m/s	

==== Heat 2 ====
Rank	Athlete	Nation	Time	Notes
1	Viktor Bryzgin	Soviet Union	10.29	Q
2	Andreas Berger	Austria	10.35	Q
3	Mike McFarlane	Great Britain	10.35	Q
4	Max Morinière	France	10.39	
5	Charles-Louis Seck	Senegal	10.43	
6	Desai Williams	Canada	10.43	
7	Cheng Hsin-fu	Chinese Taipei	10.53	
8	Harouna Pale	Burkina Faso	10.67	
			Wind: -1.5 m/s	

==== Heat 3 ====
Rank	Athlete	Nation	Time	Notes
1	Chidi Imoh	Nigeria	10.20	Q
2	Lee McRae	United States	10.21	Q
3	Pierfrancesco Pavoni	Italy	10.28	Q
4	Eric Akogyiram	Ghana	10.31	q
5	Valentin Atanasov	Bulgaria	10.37	q
6	Hiroki Fuwa	Japan	10.38	
7	Achmed de Kom	Netherlands	10.45	
8	Joilto Bonfim	Brazil	10.46	
			Wind: -0.1 m/s	

==== Heat 4 ====
Rank	Athlete	Nation	Time	Notes
1	Raymond Stewart	Jamaica	10.14	Q
2	~~Ben Johnson~~	~~Canada~~	~~10.14~~	Q
3	Andrés Simón	Cuba	10.23	Q
4	Aleksandr Yevgenyev	Soviet Union	10.37	q
5	Andrew Smith	Jamaica	10.37	q
6	José Javier Arqués	Spain	10.46	
7	Mustapha Kamel Selmi	Algeria	10.48	
8	Patrick Nwankwo	Nigeria	10.49	
			Wind: -0.4 m/s	

=== Semi-finals ===
Held on 30 August 1987. The first 4 athletes in each heat (Q) qualified to the final.

==== Heat 1 ====
Rank	Athlete	Nation	Time	Notes
1	~~Ben Johnson~~	~~Canada~~	~~10.15~~	Q
2	Linford Christie	Great Britain	10.25	Q
3	Pierfrancesco Pavoni	Italy	10.33	Q
4	Lee McRae	United States	10.37	Q
5	Andreas Berger	Austria	10.37	
6	Eric Akogyiram	Ghana	10.40	
7	Andrew Smith	Jamaica	10.41	
8	Aleksandr Yevgenyev	Soviet Union	10.51	
			Wind: -0.3 m/s	

==== Heat 2 ====
Rank	Athlete	Nation	Time	Notes
1	Carl Lewis	United States	10.03	Q, CR
2	Raymond Stewart	Jamaica	10.12	Q
3	Attila Kovács	Hungary	10.22	Q
4	Viktor Bryzgin	Soviet Union	10.23	Q
5	Andrés Simón	Cuba	10.24	
6	Chidi Imoh	Nigeria	10.29	
7	Mike McFarlane	Great Britain	10.38	
8	Valentin Atanasov	Bulgaria	10.53	
			Wind: -1.3 m/s	

=== Final ===
Held on 30 August 1987.

Rank	Athlete	Nation	Time	Notes
1st place, gold medalist(s)	Carl Lewis	United States	9.93	WR
2nd place, silver medalist(s)	Raymond Stewart	Jamaica	10.08	
3rd place, bronze medalist(s)	Linford Christie	Great Britain	10.14	
4	Attila Kovács	Hungary	10.20	
5	Viktor Bryzgin	Soviet Union	10.25	
6	Lee McRae	United States	10.34	
7	Pierfrancesco Pavoni	Italy	16.23	
DSQ	~~Ben Johnson~~	~~Canada~~	~~9.83~~	
			Wind: +1.0 m/s	
