= 1991 World Championships in Athletics – Men's 100 metres =

Men's 100 metres at the 1991 World Championships
- Venue: Olympic Stadium
- Dates: 24 August (heats and quarter-finals); 25 August (semi-finals and final)
- Competitors: 77
- Winning time: 9.86 WR

Medalists
| gold medal | Carl Lewis | United States |
| silver medal | Leroy Burrell | United States |
| bronze medal | Dennis Mitchell | United States |

Video on YouTube Official video

These are the official results of the Men's 100 metres event at the 1991 IAAF World Championships in Tokyo, Japan. There were a total number of 77 participating athletes, with ten qualifying heats and the final held on Sunday 25 August 1991. The world record, African record, and European record were broken by Carl Lewis, Frankie Fredericks, and Linford Christie, respectively. The then world record holder Leroy Burrell also bettered his previous mark of 9.90 seconds while Ray Stewart set the Jamaican record for the event.

== Medalists ==
| Gold | Carl Lewis; United States (USA) |
| Silver | Leroy Burrell; United States (USA) |
| Bronze | Dennis Mitchell; United States (USA) |

== Schedule ==
- All times are Japan Standard Time (UTC+9)

Heats
24.08.1991 – 09:00h
Quarterfinals
24.08.1991 – 17:35h
Semifinals
25.08.1991 – 17:00h
Final
25.08.1991 – 19:05h

== Records ==
Existing records at the start of the event.

| World Record | Leroy Burrell (USA) | 9.90 | New York City, United States | June 14, 1991 |
| Championship Record | Carl Lewis (USA) | 9.93 | Rome, Italy | August 30, 1987 |

== Final ==
| Rank | Athlete | Time |
|---|---|---|
| | Carl Lewis (USA) | 9.86 WR |
| | Leroy Burrell (USA) | 9.88 PB |
| | Dennis Mitchell (USA) | 9.91 PB |
| 4. | Linford Christie (GBR) | 9.92 AR |
| 5. | Frankie Fredericks (NAM) | 9.95 AR |
| 6. | Raymond Stewart (JAM) | 9.96 NR |
| 7. | Robson Caetano da Silva (BRA) | 10.12 |
| 8. | Bruny Surin (CAN) | 10.14 |

== Semifinals ==
- Held on Sunday 1991-08-25

| RANK | HEAT 1 | TIME |
|---|---|---|
| 1. | Carl Lewis (USA) | 9.93 ECR |
| 2. | Frankie Fredericks (NAM) | 10.02 |
| 3. | Bruny Surin (CAN) | 10.07 PB |
| 4. | Robson Caetano da Silva (BRA) | 10.13 |
| 5. | Olapade Adeniken (NGR) | 10.17 |
| 6. | Jean-Olivier Zirignon (CIV) | 10.25 |
| 7. | Salaam Gariba (GHA) | 10.37 |
| 8. | Michael Green (JAM) | 10.38 |

| RANK | HEAT 2 | TIME |
|---|---|---|
| 1. | Leroy Burrell (USA) | 9.94 |
| 2. | Dennis Mitchell (USA) | 9.99 |
| 3. | Linford Christie (GBR) | 9.99 |
| 4. | Raymond Stewart (JAM) | 10.03 |
| 5. | Daniel Sangouma (FRA) | 10.18 |
| 6. | Atlee Mahorn (CAN) | 10.18 |
| 7. | Davidson Ezinwa (NGR) | 10.20 |
| 8. | Ezio Madonia (ITA) | 10.33 |

== Quarterfinals ==
- Held on Saturday 1991-08-24

| RANK | HEAT 1 | TIME |
|---|---|---|
| 1. | Raymond Stewart (JAM) | 10.02 |
| 2. | Dennis Mitchell (USA) | 10.05 |
| 3. | Davidson Ezinwa (NGR) | 10.23 |
| 4. | Ezio Madonia (ITA) | 10.24 |
| 5. | Max Morinière (FRA) | 10.24 |
| 6. | Vitaliy Savin (URS) | 10.26 |
| 7. | Jacek Marlicki (POL) | 10.38 |
| 8. | Tetsuya Yamashita (JPN) | 10.56 |

| RANK | HEAT 2 | TIME |
|---|---|---|
| 1. | Carl Lewis (USA) | 9.80 |
| 2. | Linford Christie (GBR) | 9.90 |
| 3. | Bruny Surin (CAN) | 10.01 |
| 4. | Michael Green (JAM) | 10.18 |
| 5. | Emmanuel Tuffour (GHA) | 10.19 |
| 6. | Arnaldo da Silva (BRA) | 10.32 |
| 7. | Carlos Moreno (CHI) | 10.40 |
| 8. | Chidi Imoh (NGR) | 10.46 |

| RANK | HEAT 3 | TIME |
|---|---|---|
| 1. | Leroy Burrell (USA) | 10.11 |
| 2. | Daniel Sangouma (FRA) | 10.23 |
| 3. | Jean-Olivier Zirignon (CIV) | 10.30 |
| 4. | Salaam Gariba (GHA) | 10.43 |
| 5. | Darren Braithwaite (GBR) | 10.45 |
| 6. | Menelik Lawson (TOG) | 10.60 |
| 7. | Tatsuo Sugimoto (JPN) | 10.61 |
| — | Andreas Berger (AUT) | DNS |

| RANK | HEAT 4 | TIME |
|---|---|---|
| 1. | Frankie Fredericks (NAM) | 9.89 |
| 2. | Olapade Adeniken (NGR) | 10.00 |
| 3. | Atlee Mahorn (CAN) | 10.01 |
| 4. | Robson Caetano da Silva (BRA) | 10.08 |
| 5. | Satoru Inoue (JPN) | 10.21 |
| 6. | Oleh Kramarenko (URS) | 10.23 |
| 7. | Attila Kovács (HUN) | 10.32 |
| 8. | Charles-Louis Seck (SEN) | 10.46 |

== Qualifying heats ==
- Held on Saturday 1991-08-24

| RANK | HEAT 1 | TIME |
|---|---|---|
| 1. | Daniel Sangouma (FRA) | 10.27 |
| 2. | Darren Braithwaite (GBR) | 10.31 |
| 3. | Menelik Lawson (TOG) | 10.38 |
| 4. | Chidi Imoh (NGR) | 10.42 |
| 5. | Neville Hodge (ISV) | 10.51 |
| 6. | Thabani Gonye (ZIM) | 10.92 |
| 7. | Botlhoko Shebe (LES) | 10.96 |
| 8. | Ahmed Shageef (MDV) | 11.18 |

| RANK | HEAT 2 | TIME |
|---|---|---|
| 1. | Frank Fredericks (NAM) | 10.21 |
| 2. | Emmanuel Tuffour (GHA) | 10.36 |
| 3. | Jacek Marlicki (POL) | 10.49 |
| 4. | Daniel Cojocaru (ROM) | 10.51 |
| 5. | Sun-Kuk Jin (KOR) | 10.67 |
| 6. | Visut Watanasin (THA) | 10.68 |
| 7. | Mark Sherwin (COK) | 11.35 |
| | Karim Abdul (AFG) | DNS |

| RANK | HEAT 3 | TIME |
|---|---|---|
| 1. | Dennis Mitchell (USA) | 10.27 |
| 2. | Michael Green (JAM) | 10.38 |
| 3. | Salaam Gariba (GHA) | 10.38 |
| 4. | Joel Lamela (CUB) | 10.53 |
| 5. | Kennedy Ondiek (KEN) | 10.57 |
| 6. | Joel Otim (UGA) | 11.06 |
| | Mohamed Abderrehin (LBA) | DNS |

| RANK | HEAT 4 | TIME |
|---|---|---|
| 1. | Leroy Burrell (USA) | 10.17 |
| 2. | Jean-Olivier Zirignon (CIV) | 10.20 |
| 3. | Arnaldo Oliveira Silva (BRA) | 10.42 |
| 4. | Steffen Bringmann (GER) | 10.47 |
| 5. | Jason Livingston (GBR) | 10.57 |
| 6. | Florencio Aguilar (PAN) | 10.85 |
| 7. | Dudley Den Dulk (AHO) | 11.10 |

| RANK | HEAT 5 | TIME |
|---|---|---|
| 1. | Davidson Ezinwa (NGR) | 10.25 |
| 2. | Max Moriniére (FRA) | 10.28 |
| 3. | Oleh Kramarenko (URS) | 10.36 |
| 4. | Attila Kovács (HUN) | 10.39 |
| 5. | Juan Jesus Trapero (ESP) | 10.44 |
| 6. | Eduardo Nava (MEX) | 10.56 |
| 7. | Edmund Estaphane (LCA) | 10.62 |
| 8. | Trevor Davis (AIA) | 11.16 |

| RANK | HEAT 6 | TIME |
|---|---|---|
| 1. | Raymond Stewart (JAM) | 10.17 |
| 2. | Robson Caetano da Silva (BRA) | 10.24 |
| 3. | Tatsuo Sugimoto (JPN) | 10.58 |
| 4. | Valentin Atanasov (BUL) | 10.63 |
| 5. | Khalid Juma (BHR) | 10.68 |
| 6. | Ousmane Diarra (MLI) | 10.69 |
| 7. | Jerry Jeremiah (VAN) | 10.82 |
| 8. | Fred Rocio (GUM) | 12.27 |

| RANK | HEAT 7 | TIME |
|---|---|---|
| 1. | Linford Christie (GBR) | 10.39 |
| 2. | Satoru Inoue (JPN) | 10.47 |
| 3. | Charles-Louis Seck (SEN) | 10.60 |
| 4. | Eric Haynes (SKN) | 10.82 |
| 5. | Franck Zio (BUR) | 10.93 |
| 6. | Erwin Heru (INA) | 11.14 |
| 7. | Tryson Duburiya (NRU) | 12.04 |
| | Joseph Gikonyo (KEN) | DNS |

| RANK | HEAT 8 | TIME |
|---|---|---|
| 1. | Bruny Surin (CAN) | 10.28 |
| 2. | Andreas Berger (AUT) | 10.40 |
| 3. | Carlos Moreno (CHI) | 10.44 |
| 4. | Horace Dove-Edwin (SLE) | 10.48 |
| 5. | Gilles Quénéhervé (FRA) | 10.59 |
| 6. | Fortune Ogouchi (BEN) | 10.92 |
| 7. | Christian Mandengue (CMR) | 10.98 |
| 8. | Golam Ambia (BAN) | 11.09 |

| RANK | HEAT 9 | TIME |
|---|---|---|
| 1. | Carl Lewis (USA) | 10.12 |
| 2. | Ezio Madonia (ITA) | 10.43 |
| 3. | Tetsuya Yamashita (JPN) | 10.55 |
| 4. | Yiannis Zisimides (CYP) | 10.68 |
| 5. | Rodney Cox (TCA) | 11.02 |
| 6. | Jérôme Romain (DMA) | 11.09 |
| | Cengiz Kavaklioglu (TUR) | DNS |

| RANK | HEAT 10 | TIME |
|---|---|---|
| 1. | Olapade Adeniken (NGR) | 10.20 |
| 2. | Atlee Mahorn (CAN) | 10.25 |
| 3. | Vitaliy Savin (URS) | 10.36 |
| 4. | Fernando Botasso (BRA) | 10.44 |
| 5. | Junior Cornette (GUY) | 10.63 |
| 6. | Tzong-Tze Hsieh (TPE) | 10.79 |
| 7. | John Hou (PNG) | 11.04 |
| | Adam Hassam Sakkak (SUD) | DNS |

== See also ==
- 1990 Men's European Championships 100 metres (Split)
- 1992 Men's Olympic 100 metres (Barcelona)
- 1993 Men's World Championships 100 metres (Stuttgart)
