= 1989 European Athletics Indoor Championships – Men's 60 metres =

The men's 60 metres event at the 1989 European Athletics Indoor Championships was held on 18 February.

== Medalists ==
Gold	Silver	Bronze
Andreas Berger; Austria	Matthias Schlicht; West Germany	Michael Rosswess; Great Britain

== Results ==
=== Heats ===
First 3 from each heat (Q) and the next 4 fastest (q) qualified for the semifinals.

Rank	Heat	Name	Nationality	Time	Notes
1	1	Ezio Madonia	Italy	6.66	Q
1	2	Pierfrancesco Pavoni	Italy	6.66	Q
1	3	Andreas Berger	Austria	6.66	Q
4	1	Jiří Hudec	Czechoslovakia	6.67	Q
4	2	Matthias Schlicht	West Germany	6.67	Q
6	1	Ronald Desruelles	Belgium	6.68	Q
7	4	Antonio Ullo	Italy	6.70	Q
8	2	Michael Rosswess	Great Britain	6.71	Q
9	4	Mike McFarlane	Great Britain	6.73	Q
10	3	Jouni Myllymäki	Finland	6.74	Q
10	4	Anri Grigorov	Bulgaria	6.74	Q
12	2	Attila Kovács	Hungary	6.75	q
13	2	José Javier Arqués	Spain	6.76	q
14	3	Vitaliy Savin	Soviet Union	6.77	Q
15	3	Bruno Marie-Rose	France	6.79	q
16	3	László Karaffa	Hungary	6.80	q
17	2	Patrick Stevens	Belgium	6.82	
18	4	Sándor Utasi	Hungary	6.83	
19	2	Yiannios Zisimides	Cyprus	6.84	
19	3	Kennet Kjensli	Norway	6.84	
21	4	Arnaldo Abrantes	Portugal	6.85	
22	1	Luís Cunha	Portugal	6.92	
23	4	Geir Moen	Norway	6.99	
24	3	Aris Georgiadis	Cyprus	7.01	
25	1	Baris Özatman	Turkey	7.04	

=== Semifinals ===
First 3 from each semifinal (Q) and the nest 2 fastest (q) qualified for the final.

Rank	Heat	Name	Nationality	Time	Notes
1	1	Andreas Berger	Austria	6.58	Q
2	2	Antonio Ullo	Italy	6.63	Q
3	2	Matthias Schlicht	West Germany	6.64	Q
4	1	Michael Rosswess	Great Britain	6.65	Q
5	1	Pierfrancesco Pavoni	Italy	6.66	Q
6	1	Vitaliy Savin	Soviet Union	6.67	q
6	2	Anri Grigorov	Bulgaria	6.67	Q
6	2	Ronald Desruelles	Belgium	6.67	q
9	2	Ezio Madonia	Italy	6.68	
10	1	Jiří Hudec	Czechoslovakia	6.69	
11	2	Mike McFarlane	Great Britain	6.70	
12	2	José Javier Arqués	Spain	6.73	
13	1	Attila Kovács	Hungary	6.75	
14	1	Bruno Marie-Rose	France	6.78	
15	1	Jouni Myllymäki	Finland	6.79	
16	2	László Karaffa	Hungary	6.81	

=== Final ===
Rank	Lane	Name	Nationality	Time	Notes
1st place, gold medalist(s)	4	Andreas Berger	Austria	6.56	=NR
2nd place, silver medalist(s)	3	Matthias Schlicht	West Germany	6.58	
3rd place, bronze medalist(s)	5	Michael Rosswess	Great Britain	6.59	
4	7	Pierfrancesco Pavoni	Italy	6.62	
5	8	Ronald Desruelles	Belgium	6.66	
6	6	Antonio Ullo	Italy	6.68	
7	1	Vitaliy Savin	Soviet Union	6.68	
8	2	Anri Grigorov	Bulgaria	6.69	
