= 1987 World Championships in Athletics – Men's 200 metres =

Men's 200 metres at the 1987 World Championships
- Venue: Stadio Olimpico
- Dates: 1 September (heats and quarter-finals); 3 September (semi-finals and final)
- Competitors: 47
- Winning time: 20.16

Medalists
gold medal	Calvin Smith	United States
silver medal	Gilles Quénéhervé	France
bronze medal	John Regis	Great Britain

These are the official results of the Men's 200 metres event at the 1987 IAAF World Championships in Rome, Italy. There were a total number of 47 participating athletes, with six qualifying heats and the final held on Thursday 1987-09-03.

== Medalists ==
Gold	Calvin Smith; United States (USA)
Silver	Gilles Quénéhervé; France (FRA)
Bronze	(United Kingdom) John Regis; Great Britain (GBR)

== Records ==
Existing records at the start of the event.

World Record	Pietro Mennea (ITA)	19.72	Mexico City, Mexico	September 12, 1979
Championship Record	Calvin Smith (USA)	20.14	Helsinki, Finland	August 14, 1983

== Final ==
RANK	FINAL wind -0.4	TIME
	Calvin Smith (USA)	20.16
	Gilles Quénéhervé (FRA)	20.16
	John Regis (GBR)	20.18
4.	Robson da Silva (BRA)	20.22
5.	Vladimir Krylov (URS)	20.23
6.	Floyd Heard (USA)	20.25
7.	Pierfrancesco Pavoni (ITA)	20.45
8.	Atlee Mahorn (CAN)	20.78

== Semifinals ==
- Held on Thursday 1987-09-03

RANK	HEAT 1 wind +0.5	TIME
1.	John Regis (GBR)	20.54
2.	Calvin Smith (USA)	20.54
3.	Atlee Mahorn (CAN)	20.69
4.	Pierfrancesco Pavoni (ITA)	20.78
5.	Wallace Spearmon (USA)	20.87
6.	Andreas Berger (AUT)	20.99
7.	István Nagy (HUN)	21.22
8.	Andrey Fedoriv (URS)	21.28

RANK	HEAT 2 wind +1.2	TIME
1.	Gilles Quénéhervé (FRA)	20.31
2.	Floyd Heard (USA)	20.31
3.	Vladimir Krylov (URS)	20.34
4.	Robson Caetano da Silva (BRA)	20.38
5.	Attila Kovács (HUN)	20.47
6.	Clive Wright (JAM)	20.50
7.	Stefano Tilli (ITA)	20.86
8.	Simeon Kipkemboi (KEN)	20.90

== Quarterfinals ==
- Held on Tuesday 1987-09-01

RANK	HEAT 1 wind -1.5	TIME
1.	Floyd Heard (USA)	20.56
2.	Vladimir Krylov (URS)	20.79
3.	István Nagy (HUN)	21.11
4.	Daniel Sangouma (FRA)	21.11
5.	Peter Klein (FRG)	21.12
6.	Sergio Querol (CUB)	21.37
7.	Achmed de Kom (NED)	21.39
8.	Neville Hodge (ISV)	21.68

RANK	HEAT 2 wind -1.3	TIME
1.	Calvin Smith (USA)	20.38
2.	Atlee Mahorn (CAN)	20.64
3.	Simeon Kipkemboi (KEN)	20.88
4.	Stefano Tilli (ITA)	20.89
5.	Christian Haas (FRG)	20.94
6.	Luís Barroso (POR)	21.20
7.	Bruno Marie-Rose (FRA)	26.25
	Nelson Boateng (GHA)	DNS

RANK	HEAT 3 wind +0.4	TIME
1.	Gilles Quénéhervé (FRA)	20.48
2.	Wallace Spearmon (USA)	20.55
3.	John Regis (GBR)	20.60
4.	Andreas Berger (AUT)	20.86
5.	Andrey Fedoriv (URS)	20.87
6.	Volker Westhagemann (FRG)	20.98
7.	Arnaldo Oliveira Silva (BRA)	21.15
8.	Robert Stone (AUS)	21.23

RANK	HEAT 4 wind +0.8	TIME
1.	Robson Caetano da Silva (BRA)	20.48
2.	Attila Kovács (HUN)	20.61
3.	Pierfrancesco Pavoni (ITA)	20.65
4.	Clive Wright (JAM)	20.67
5.	Besik Gotsiridze (URS)	20.90
6.	Jindrich Roun (TCH)	21.12
7.	Mustapha Kamel Selmi (ALG)	21.26
8.	Harouna Pale (BUR)	21.46

== Qualifying heats ==
- Held on Tuesday 1987-09-01

RANK	HEAT 1 wind +0.5	TIME
1.	Floyd Heard (USA)	20.37
2.	Vladimir Krylov (URS)	20.77
3.	Peter Klein (FRG)	20.89
4.	Mustapha Kamel Selmi (ALG)	21.14
5.	Nelson Boateng (GHA)	21.19
6.	Harouna Pale (BUR)	21.26
7.	Dazel Jules (TRI)	21.53
	Linford Christie (GBR)	DNS

RANK	HEAT 2 wind -0.9	TIME
1.	Attila Kovács (HUN)	20.77
2.	Bruno Marie-Rose (FRA)	20.82
3.	Besik Gotsiridze (URS)	20.89
4.	Sergio Querol (CUB)	20.94
5.	Stefano Tilli (ITA)	21.01
6.	Feng Li (CHN)	21.47
7.	Felix Sandy (SLE)	21.67
8.	Yaya Seyba (MLI)	21.93

RANK	HEAT 3 wind -0.1	TIME
1.	Gilles Quénéhervé (FRA)	20.59
2.	Clive Wright (JAM)	20.88
3.	Achmed de Kom (NED)	21.11
4.	Volker Westhagemann (FRG)	21.15
5.	Neville Hodge (ISV)	21.33
6.	Haron Mundir (SIN)	21.51
7.	John Dinan (AUS)	21.62
8.	Mark Sherwin (COK)	23.41

RANK	HEAT 4 wind +0.7	TIME
1.	Robson Caetano da Silva (BRA)	20.56
2.	Atlee Mahorn (CAN)	20.62
3.	Andreas Berger (AUT)	20.82
4.	Andrey Fedoriv (URS)	20.93
5.	István Nagy (HUN)	21.06
6.	Luís Barroso (POR)	21.15
7.	Leung Wing Kwong (HKG)	21.48
8.	Sahim Saleh Mehdi (YEM)	23.07

RANK	HEAT 5 wind -0.8	TIME
1.	Calvin Smith (USA)	20.62
2.	Daniel Sangouma (FRA)	20.80
3.	Simeon Kipkemboi (KEN)	20.84
4.	Christian Haas (FRG)	20.96
5.	Jindrich Roun (TCH)	21.04
6.	Ian Morris (TRI)	21.36
7.	Takale Tuna (PNG)	22.06
8.	Peauope Suli (TGA)	22.45

RANK	HEAT 6 wind +0.3	TIME
1.	John Regis (GBR)	20.76
2.	Pierfrancesco Pavoni (ITA)	20.80
3.	Wallace Spearmon (USA)	20.82
4.	Arnaldo Oliveira Silva (BRA)	21.03
5.	Robert Stone (AUS)	21.23
6.	Alvin Daniel (TRI)	21.37
7.	Secundino Borabota (GEQ)	23.66

== See also ==
- 1982 Men's European Championships 200 metres (Athens)
- 1983 Men's World Championships 200 metres (Helsinki)
- 1984 Men's Olympic 200 metres (Los Angeles)
- 1986 Men's European Championships 200 metres (Stuttgart)
- 1988 Men's Olympic 200 metres (Seoul)
- 1990 Men's European Championships 200 metres (Split)
- 1991 Men's World Championships 200 metres (Tokyo)
