= 1986 European Athletics Championships – Men's 4 × 100 metres relay =

Men's 4 × 100 metres relay at the European Athletics Championships

The men's 4 × 100 metres relay event at the 1986 European Athletics Championships was held in Stuttgart, then West Germany, at Neckarstadion on 30 and 31 August 1986.

== Medalists ==
Gold	Aleksandr Yevgenyev; Nikolay Yushmanov; Vladimir Muravyov; Viktor Bryzgin; Soviet Union
Silver	Thomas Schröder; Steffen Bringmann; Olaf Prenzler; Frank Emmelmann; East Germany
Bronze	Elliot Bunney; Daley Thompson; Mike McFarlane; Linford Christie; United Kingdom

== Results ==
=== Final ===
31 August

Rank	Nation	Competitors	Time	Notes
1st place, gold medalist(s)	Soviet Union	Aleksandr Yevgenyev; Nikolay Yushmanov; Vladimir Muravyov; Viktor Bryzgin	38.29	CR
2nd place, silver medalist(s)	East Germany	Thomas Schröder; Steffen Bringmann; Olaf Prenzler; Frank Emmelmann	38.64	
3rd place, bronze medalist(s)	United Kingdom	Elliot Bunney; Daley Thompson; Mike McFarlane; Linford Christie	38.71	
4	France	Thierry François; Gilles Quénéhervé; Antoine Richard; Bruno Marie-Rose	38.81	
5	Italy	Antonio Ullo; Carlo Simionato; Pierfrancesco Pavoni; Stefano Tilli	38.86	
6	Hungary	László Karaffa; István Nagy; István Tatár; Attila Kovács	39.15	
7	Bulgaria	Nikolay Markov; Anri Grigorov; Krasimir Bozhinovski; Valentin Atanasov	39.33	
8	Portugal	Arnaldo Abrantes; Pedro Curvelo; Luís Cunha; Pedro Agostinho	39.74	NR

=== Heats ===
30 August

==== Heat 1 ====
Rank	Nation	Competitors	Time	Notes
1	France	Thierry François; Gilles Quénéhervé; Antoine Richard; Bruno Marie-Rose	38.97	Q
2	United Kingdom	Elliot Bunney; Daley Thompson; Mike McFarlane; Linford Christie	39.26	Q
3	Soviet Union	Andrey Shlyapnikov; Nikolay Yushmanov; Vladimir Muravyov; Viktor Bryzgin	39.30	Q
4	Hungary	László Karaffa; István Nagy; István Tatár; Attila Kovács	39.42	q
5	Portugal	Arnaldo Abrantes; Pedro Curvelo; Luís Cunha; Pedro Agostinho	39.86	NR q

==== Heat 2 ====
Rank	Nation	Competitors	Time	Notes
1	East Germany	Thomas Schröder; Steffen Bringmann; Olaf Prenzler; Frank Emmelmann	38.81	Q
2	Italy	Antonio Ullo; Carlo Simionato; Pierfrancesco Pavoni; Stefano Tilli	39.03	Q
3	Bulgaria	Nikolay Markov; Anri Grigorov; Krasimir Bozhinovski; Valentin Atanasov	39.23	Q
	West Germany	Volker Westhagemann; Werner Zaske; Peter Klein; Jürgen Evers	DNF	

== Participation ==
According to an unofficial count, 37 athletes from 9 countries participated in the event.

- Bulgaria (4)
- East Germany (4)
- France (4)
- Hungary (4)
- Italy (4)
- Portugal (4)
- Soviet Union (5)
- United Kingdom (4)
- West Germany (4)
