= L'Équipe Champion of Champions =

Set of four French sports awards

L'Équipe Champion of Champions (French: Champion des champions de L'Équipe) refers to four awards presented by the daily sports newspaper L'Équipe, to female and male international sports athletes and female and male French sports athletes.

Various special awards have also been presented in the past. At the 2014 awards, former Belgian cyclist Eddy Merckx was awarded the title Legende des Sports (Champion des champions de légende), while Danish racing driver Tom Kristensen also received an honorary award (Champion des champions d'honneur). French snowboarder Xavier de Le Rue won the 2014 award for best extreme athlete (Champion des champions de l'extrême).

== International ==
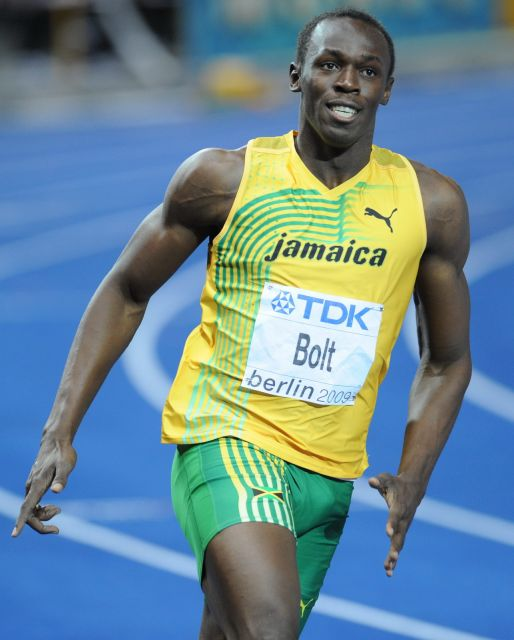
Athletics sportsman Usain Bolt has won the most awards (5).

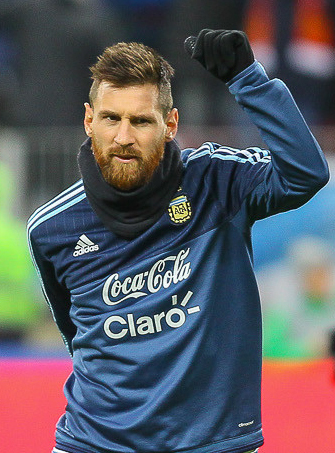
Lionel Messi is the only footballer to win the award twice.

Year	Winner	Sport	Country
1980	Eric Heiden	Speed skating	United States
1981	Sebastian Coe	Athletics	United Kingdom
1982	Paolo Rossi	Football	Italy
1983	Carl Lewis	Athletics	United States
1984	Carl Lewis (2)	Athletics	United States
1985	Sergey Bubka	Athletics	Soviet Union
1986	Diego Maradona	Football	Argentina
1987*	~~Ben Johnson~~	~~Athletics~~	~~Canada~~
1988	Florence Griffith-Joyner	Athletics	United States
1989	Greg LeMond	Cycling	United States
1990	Ayrton Senna	Formula One	Brazil
1991	Carl Lewis (3)	Athletics	United States
1992	Michael Jordan	Basketball	United States
1993	Noureddine Morceli	Athletics	Algeria
1994	Romário	Football	Brazil
1995	Jonathan Edwards	Athletics	United Kingdom
1996	Michael Johnson	Athletics	United States
1997	Sergey Bubka	Athletics	Ukraine
1998	Zinedine Zidane	Football	France
1999	Andre Agassi	Tennis	United States
2000	Tiger Woods	Golf	United States
2001	Michael Schumacher	Formula One	Germany
2002	Michael Schumacher (2)	Formula One	Germany
2003	Michael Schumacher (3)	Formula One	Germany
2004	Hicham El Guerrouj	Athletics	Morocco
2005	Roger Federer	Tennis	Switzerland
2006	Roger Federer (2)	Tennis	Switzerland
2007	Roger Federer (3)	Tennis	Switzerland
2008	Usain Bolt	Athletics	Jamaica
2009	Usain Bolt (2)	Athletics	Jamaica
2010	Rafael Nadal	Tennis	Spain
2011	Lionel Messi	Football	Argentina
↓ Male and female awards separated ↓
2012	Usain Bolt (3)	Athletics	Jamaica
2012	Serena Williams	Tennis	United States
2013	Rafael Nadal (2)	Tennis	Spain
2013	Serena Williams (2)	Tennis	United States
2014	Renaud Lavillenie	Athletics	France
2014	Katie Ledecky	Swimming	United States
2015	Usain Bolt (4)	Athletics	Jamaica
2015	Serena Williams (3)	Tennis	United States
2016	Usain Bolt (5)	Athletics	Jamaica
2016	Simone Biles	Gymnastics	United States
2017	Rafael Nadal (3); Roger Federer (4)	Tennis	Spain; Switzerland
2017	Katie Ledecky (2)	Swimming	United States
2018	Marcel Hirscher	Alpine skiing	Austria
2018	Simone Biles (2)	Gymnastics	United States
2019	Rafael Nadal (4)	Tennis	Spain
2019	Simone Biles (3)	Gymnastics	United States
2020	Lewis Hamilton	Formula One	United Kingdom
2020	Marte Olsbu Røiseland	Biathlon	Norway
2021	Novak Djokovic	Tennis	Serbia
2021	Elaine Thompson	Athletics	Jamaica
2022	Lionel Messi (2)	Football	Argentina
2022	Iga Świątek	Tennis	Poland
2023	Novak Djokovic (2)	Tennis	Serbia
2023	Simone Biles (4)	Gymnastics	United States
2024	Léon Marchand	Swimming	France
2024	Simone Biles (5)	Gymnastics	United States
2025	Tadej Pogacar	Cycling	Slovenia
2025	Summer McIntosh	Swimming	Canada

* — 1987 award taken away after doping scandal

== French ==
Year	Winner	Sport
1946	Jean Séphériades	Rowing
1947	Christian d'Oriola	Fencing
1948	Marcel Cerdan	Boxing
1949	Alain Mimoun	Athletics
1950	Papa Gallo Thiam	Athletics
1951	Puig Aubert	Rugby league
1952	Jean Boiteux	Swimming
1953	Louison Bobet	Cycling
1954	Louison Bobet (2)	Cycling
1955	Raymond Kopa	Football
1956	Alain Mimoun (2)	Athletics
1957	Roger Rivière	Cycling
1958	Raymond Kopa (2)	Football
1959	Lucien Mias	Rugby union
1960	Michel Jazy	Athletics
1961	Guy Périllat	Alpine skiing
1962	Michel Jazy (2)	Athletics
1963	Jacques Anquetil	Cycling
1964	Marielle Goitschel	Alpine skiing
1965	Michel Jazy (3)	Athletics
1966	Alain Mosconi	Swimming
1967	Jean-Claude Killy	Alpine skiing
1968	Jean-Claude Killy (2)	Alpine skiing
1969	Nicole Duclos	Athletics
1970	Jean-Claude Nallet	Athletics
1971	Jean-Claude Bouttier; Régis Ovion	Boxing; Cycling
1972	Daniel Morelon	Cycling
1973	François Cevert	Formula One
1974	Guy Drut; Raymond Poulidor	Athletics; Cycling
1975	Guy Drut (2); Bernard Thévenet	Athletics; Cycling
1976	Guy Drut (3)	Athletics
1977	Michel Platini	Football
1978	Bernard Hinault	Cycling
1979	Bernard Hinault (2)	Cycling
1980	Bernard Hinault (3)	Cycling
1981	Bernard Hinault (4)	Cycling
1982	Alain Giresse	Football
1983	Yannick Noah	Tennis
1984	Michel Platini (2)	Football
1985	Alain Prost	Formula One
1986	Alain Prost (2)	Formula One
1987	Jeannie Longo	Cycling
1988	Jean-François Lamour	Fencing
1989	Alain Prost (3)	Formula One
1990	Florence Arthaud	Sailing
1990	Max Morinière; Daniel Sangouma; Jean-Charles Trouabal; Bruno Marie-Rose	Athletics
1991	Guy Forget; Henri Leconte	Tennis
1992	Marie-José Pérec	Athletics
1993	Alain Prost (4)	Formula One
1994	Luc Leblanc	Cycling
1995	David Douillet	Judo
1996	Marie-José Pérec (2)	Athletics
1997	Luc Alphand	Alpine skiing
1998	Zinedine Zidane	Football
1999	Eunice Barber	Athletics
2000	David Douillet (2)	Judo
2001	Jackson Richardson	Handball
2002	Carole Montillet	Alpine skiing
2003	Tony Parker	Basketball
2004	Laure Manaudou	Swimming
2005	Ladji Doucouré	Athletics
2006	Laure Manaudou (2)	Swimming
2007	Sébastien Loeb (MCO) Daniel Elena	Rallying
2008	Alain Bernard	Swimming
2009	Sébastien Loeb (2) (MCO) Daniel Elena (2)	Rallying
2010	Christophe Lemaitre	Athletics
2011	Nikola Karabatić	Handball
↓ Male and female awards separated ↓
2012	Teddy Riner	Judo
2012	Camille Muffat	Swimming
2013	Tony Parker (2)	Basketball
2013	Marion Bartoli	Tennis
2014	Renaud Lavillenie	Athletics
2014	Pauline Ferrand-Prévot	Cycling
2015	Florent Manaudou	Swimming
2015	Pauline Ferrand-Prévot (2)	Cycling
2016	Teddy Riner (2)	Judo
2016	Émilie Andéol	Judo
2017	Teddy Riner (3)	Judo
2017	Tessa Worley	Alpine skiing
2018	Kevin Mayer	Athletics
2018	Clarisse Agbegnenou	Judo
2019	Julian Alaphilippe	Cycling
2019	Clarisse Agbegnenou (2)	Judo
2020	Julian Alaphilippe (2)	Cycling
2020	Pauline Ferrand-Prévot (3)	Cycling
2021	Julian Alaphilippe (3)	Cycling
2021	Clarisse Agbegnenou (3)	Judo
2022	Kylian Mbappé	Football
2022	Caroline Garcia	Tennis
2023	Léon Marchand	Swimming
2023	Céline Boutier	Golf
2023	Alexandre Léauté	Para-cycling
2023	Heïdi Gaugain	Para-cycling
2024	Léon Marchand (2)	Swimming
2024	Cassandre Beaugrand	Triathlon
2024	Alexandre Léauté (2)	Para-cycling
2024	Marie Patouillet	Para-cycling
