= 1990 European Athletics Championships – Men's 4 × 100 metres relay =

Men's 4 × 100 metres relay at the European Athletics Championships

These are the official results of the Men's 4 × 100 metres event at the 1990 European Championships in Split, Yugoslavia, held at Stadion Poljud on 31 August 1990.

== Medalists ==
Gold	Max Morinière; Daniel Sangouma; Jean-Charles Trouabal; Bruno Marie-Rose; France
Silver	Darren Braithwaite; John Regis; Marcus Adam; Linford Christie; United Kingdom
Bronze	Mario Longo; Ezio Madonia; Sandro Floris; Stefano Tilli; Italy

== Results ==
=== Final ===
31 August

Rank	Nation	Competitors	Time	Notes
1st place, gold medalist(s)	France	Max Morinière; Daniel Sangouma; Jean-Charles Trouabal; Bruno Marie-Rose	37.79	WR
2nd place, silver medalist(s)	United Kingdom	Darren Braithwaite; John Regis; Marcus Adam; Linford Christie	37.98	NR
3rd place, bronze medalist(s)	Italy	Mario Longo; Ezio Madonia; Sandro Floris; Stefano Tilli	38.39	
4	Soviet Union	Innokentiy Zharov; Vladimir Krylov; Oleg Fatun; Aleksandr Sokolov	38.46	
5	Hungary	György Bakos; László Karaffa; Pál Rezák; Attila Kovács	39.05	
6	Spain	Florencio Gascón; Enrique Talavera; José Javier Arqués; Luis Rodríguez	39.10	
7	Portugal	Fernando Damásio; Pedro Curvelo; Pedro Agostinho; Luis Barroso	39.33	

=== Heats ===
31 August

==== Heat 1 ====
Rank	Nation	Competitors	Time	Notes
1	United Kingdom	Darren Braithwaite; John Regis; Marcus Adam; Linford Christie	38.90	Q
2	Italy	Mario Longo; Ezio Madonia; Sandro Floris; Stefano Tilli	39.17	Q
3	Portugal	Fernando Damásio; Pedro Curvelo; Pedro Agostinho; Luis Barroso	40.01	Q
	East Germany	Sven Matthes; Steffen Görmer; Torsten Heimrath; Steffen Bringmann	DNF	
	Norway	Kennet Kjensli; Geir Moen; Vidar Jakobsen; Aham Okeke	DNF	

==== Heat 2 ====
Rank	Nation	Competitors	Time	Notes
1	France	Max Morinière; Daniel Sangouma; Jean-Charles Trouabal; Bruno Marie-Rose	38.81	Q
2	Soviet Union	Innokentiy Zharov; Vladimir Krylov; Oleg Fatun; Aleksandr Sokolov	39.21	Q
3	Hungary	György Bakos; László Karaffa; Pál Rezák; Attila Kovács	39.66	Q
4	Spain	Florencio Gascón; Enrique Talavera; José Javier Arqués; Luis Rodríguez	39.89	q

== Participation ==
According to an unofficial count, 36 athletes from 9 countries participated in the event.

- East Germany (4)
- France (4)
- Hungary (4)
- Italy (4)
- Norway (4)
- Portugal (4)
- Soviet Union (4)
- Spain (4)
- United Kingdom (4)

== See also ==
- 1991 Men's World Championships 4 × 100 m Relay (Tokyo)
- 1992 Men's Olympic 4 × 100 m Relay (Barcelona)
- 1993 Men's World Championships 4 × 100 m Relay (Stuttgart)
