= 1983 World Championships in Athletics – Men's 4 × 100 metres relay =

Video on YouTube Official video

The 4 × 100 metres relay at the 1983 World Championships in Athletics was held at the Helsinki Olympic Stadium on August 9 and August 10.

== Medals ==
Gold:	Silver:	Bronze:
United States; Emmit King; Willie Gault; Calvin Smith; Carl Lewis	Italy; Stefano Tilli; Carlo Simionato; Pierfrancesco Pavoni; Pietro Mennea	Soviet Union; Andrey Prokofyev; Nikolay Sidorov; Vladimir Muravyov; Viktor Bryzgin

== Records ==
Existing records at the start of the event.

World Record	United States (USA)	38.03	Düsseldorf, West Germany	September 3, 1977
Championship Record	New event			

== Results ==
=== Heats ===
All times shown are in seconds.

AR area record | CR championship record | GR games record | NR national record | OR Olympic record | PB personal best | SB season best | WL world leading (in a given season)
DNS = did not start | DQ = disqualification | NM = no mark (i.e. no valid result) | Q = qualification by place in heat | q = qualification by overall place

==== Heat 1 ====
1. East Germany (Andreas Knebel, Thomas Schröder, Jens Hübler, Frank Emmelmann) 39.22 Q
2. Bulgaria (Krasimir Sarbakov, Yordan Vandov, Bogomil Karadimov, Valentin Atanasov) 39.55 Q
3. Great Britain (Ainsley Bennett, Donovan Reid, Mike McFarlane, Drew McMaster) 39.56 Q
4. Nigeria (Innocent Egbunike, Ikpoto Eseme, Samson Oyeledun, Chidi Imoh) 39.62 Q
5. Finland (Jouko Lehtinen, Jouko Hassi, Jukka Sihvonen, Kimmo Saaristo) 39.65 q
6. Bahamas (Fabian Whymns, Austin Albury, Joey Wells, David Charlton) 39.91 q
7. Ghana (Ernest Obeng, Sam Aidoo, Edward Pappoe, Awudu Nuhu) 41.92
  - Cuba DNS

==== Heat 2 ====
1. United States (Emmit King, Willie Gault, Calvin Smith, Carl Lewis) 38.75 Q
2. Italy (Stefano Tilli, Carlo Simionato, Pierfrancesco Pavoni, Pietro Mennea) 39.40 Q
3. Hungary (Ferenc Kiss, István Nagy, László Babály, István Tatár) 39.58 Q
4. Australia (Paul Narracott, Gerrard Keating, Bruce Frayne, Gary Minihan) 40.02 Q
5. Ivory Coast (Otokpa Kouadio, Avognan Nogboum, Georges Kablan Degnan, Gabriel Tiacoh) 40.70
  - China (Wang Shaoming, He Baodang, Cai Jianming, Yan Guoqiang) DQ
  - Canada (Ben Johnson, Atlee Mahorn, Desai Williams, Tony Sharpe) DQ
  - Kenya (Alfred Nyambane Johnson, Peter Wekesa, John Anzrah, Moja Shivanda) DQ

==== Heat 3 ====
1. Soviet Union (Andrey Prokofyev, Nikolay Sidorov, Vladimir Muravyov, Viktor Bryzgin) 38.77 Q
2. France (Thierry Francois, Marc Gasparoni, Antoine Richard, Jean-Jacques Boussemart) 39.17 Q
3. West Germany (Werner Bastians, Christian Haas, Jürgen Evers, Andreas Rizzi) 39.35 Q
4. Poland (Krzysztof Zwoliński, Zenon Licznerski, Czesław Prądzyński, Marian Woronin) 39.41 Q
5. Jamaica (George Walcott, Ray Stewart, Leroy Reid, Colin Bradford) 39.49 q
6. Greece (Angelos Angelidis, Theodoros Gatzios, Nikos Hadjinicolaou, Kosmas Stratos) 39.85 q
7. Thailand (Somsak Boontad, Suchart Chairsuvaparb, Prasit Boomprasert, Sumet Promna) 40.17
8. Chinese Taipei (Wu Jing-Yee, Lee Kuo-Sheng, Hwang Chian-Shin, Hwang Sheng-Tai) 40.49

=== Semi-finals ===
==== Heat 1 ====
1. Soviet Union (Andrey Prokofyev, Nikolay Sidorov, Vladimir Muravyov, Viktor Bryzgin) 38.62 Q
2. Italy (Stefano Tilli, Carlo Simionato, Pierfrancesco Pavoni, Pietro Mennea) 38.74 Q
3. Poland (Krzysztof Zwoliński, Zenon Licznerski, Czesław Prądzyński, Marian Woronin) 39.01 Q
4. France (Thierry Francois, Marc Gasparoni, Antoine Richard, Jean-Jacques Boussemart) 39.14 Q
5. Nigeria (Innocent Egbunike, Ikpoto Eseme, Samson Oyeledun, Chidi Imoh) 39.44
6. Greece (Angelos Angelidis, Theodoros Gatzios, Nikos Hadjinicolaou, Kosmas Stratos) 39.71
7. Finland (Jouko Lehtinen, Jouko Hassi, Jukka Sihvonen, Kimmo Saaristo) 40.02
  - Hungary (Ferenc Kiss, István Nagy, László Babály, István Tatár) DNF

==== Heat 2 ====
1. United States (Emmit King, Willie Gault, Calvin Smith, Carl Lewis) 38.50 Q
2. East Germany (Andreas Knebel, Thomas Schröder, Jens Hübler, Frank Emmelmann) 38.95 Q
3. West Germany (Werner Bastians, Christian Haas, Jürgen Evers, Andreas Rizzi) 39.13 Q
4. Jamaica (George Walcott, Ray Stewart, Leroy Reid, Colin Bradford) 39.18 Q
5. Great Britain (Ainsley Bennett, Donovan Reid, Mike McFarlane, Drew McMaster) 39.39
6. Bulgaria (Krasimir Sarbakov, Yordan Vandov, Bogomil Karadimov, Valentin Atanasov) 39.59
7. Bahamas (Fabian Whymns, Austin Albury, Joey Wells, David Charlton) 40.52
  - Australia (Paul Narracott, Gerrard Keating, Bruce Frayne, Gary Minihan) DNS

=== Final ===
1. United States (Emmit King, Willie Gault, Calvin Smith, Carl Lewis) 37.86 (WR)
2. Italy (Stefano Tilli, Carlo Simionato, Pierfrancesco Pavoni, Pietro Mennea) 38.37 (NR)
3. Soviet Union (Andrey Prokofyev, Nikolay Sidorov, Vladimir Muravyov, Viktor Bryzgin) 38.41
4. East Germany (Andreas Knebel, Thomas Schröder, Jens Hübler, Frank Emmelmann) 38.51
5. West Germany (Werner Bastians, Christian Haas, Jürgen Evers, Andreas Rizzi) 38.56
6. Poland (Krzysztof Zwoliński, Zenon Licznerski, Czesław Prądzyński, Marian Woronin) 38.72
7. Jamaica (George Walcott, Ray Stewart, Leroy Reid, Colin Bradford) 38.75
8. France (Thierry Francois, Marc Gasparoni, Antoine Richard, Jean-Jacques Boussemart) 38.98
