= 1991 World Championships in Athletics – Men's 4 × 100 metres relay =

Video on YouTube Official video

These are the official results of the Men's 4 × 100 metres event at the 1991 IAAF World Championships in Tokyo, Japan. Their final was held on Sunday September 1, 1991.

== Schedule ==
- All times are Japan Standard Time (UTC+9)

Semi-Final
31.08.1991 – 18:40h
Final
01.09.1991 – 16:50h

== Final ==
RANK	NATION	ATHLETES	TIME
	United States (USA)	• Andre Cason • Leroy Burrell • Dennis Mitchell • Carl Lewis	37.50; WR
	France (FRA)	• Max Morinière • Daniel Sangouma • Jean-Charles Trouabal • Bruno Marie-Rose	37.87
	Great Britain (GBR)	• Tony Jarrett • John Regis • Darren Braithwaite • Linford Christie	38.09
4.	Nigeria (NGR)	• George Ogbeide • Olapade Adeniken • Victor Omagbemi • Davidson Ezinwa	38.43
5.	Italy (ITA)	• Mario Longo • Ezio Madonia • Sandro Floris • Stefano Tilli	38.52
6.	Jamaica (JAM)	• Dennis Mowatt • Raymond Stewart • Michael Green • John Mair	38.67
7.	Soviet Union (URS)	• Viktor Bryzhin • Aleksandr Sokolov • Oleh Kramarenko • Vitaliy Savin	38.68
8.	Canada (CAN)	• Ben Johnson • Mike Dwyer • Cyprian Enweani • Peter Ogilvie	39.51

== Heats ==
- Held on Saturday 1991-08-31

=== Heat 1 ===
RANK	NATION	ATHLETES	TIME
1	France (FRA)	• Max Moriniére • Daniel Sangouma • Jean-Charles Trouabal • Bruno Marie-Rose	38.29
2	Great Britain (GBR)	• Tony Jarrett • John Regis • Darren Braithwaite • Linford Christie	38.36
3	Jamaica (JAM)	• Michael Green • Raymond Stewart • Wayne Watson • John Mair	38.45
4.	Italy (ITA)	• Mario Longo • Ezio Madonia • Sandro Floris • Stefano Tilli	38.74
5.	Poland (POL)	• Jacek Marlicki • Robert Maćkowiak • Marek Zalewski • Jarosław Kaniecki	39.08
6.	Spain (ESP)	• Luis Rodríguez • Miguel Angel Gomez • Juan Jesus Trapero • Enrique Talavera	39.52
7.	Mexico (MEX)	• Genaro Rojas • Eduardo Nava • Herman Adam • Jaime Lopez	39.85
	Germany (GER)	• Wolfgang Haupt • Steffen Bringmann • Steffen Görmer • Florian Schwarthoff	DQ

=== Heat 2 ===
RANK	NATION	ATHLETES	TIME
1	United States (USA)	• Andre Cason • Leroy Burrell • Dennis Mitchell • Michael Marsh	37.75; CR
2	Nigeria (NGR)	• George Ogbeide • Olapade Adeniken • Victor Omagbemi • Davidson Ezinwa	38.44
3	Soviet Union (URS)	• Viktor Bryzhin • Aleksandr Sokolov • Oleh Kramarenko • Vitaliy Savin	38.74
4	Canada (CAN)	• Peter Ogilvie • Atlee Mahorn • Ben Johnson • Bruny Surin	38.76
5.	Cuba (CUB)	• Joel Lamela • Leandro Peñalver • Félix Stevens • Jorge Aguilera	39.15
6.	Japan (JPN)	• Satoru Inoue • Tatsuo Sugimoto • Yoshiyuki Okuyama • Tetsuya Yamashita	39.19
7.	Ghana (GHA)	• John Myles-Mills • Eric Akogyiram • Salaam Gariba • Emmanuel Tuffour	39.55
8.	Austria (AUT)	• Gernot Kellermayr • Thomas Renner • Franz Ratzenberger • Herwig Röttl	39.85

== See also ==
- 1990 Men's European Championships 4 × 100 m Relay (Split)
- 1992 Men's Olympic 4 × 100 m Relay (Barcelona)
- 1993 Men's World Championships 4 × 100 m Relay (Stuttgart)
