= John Mair (sprinter) =

Jamaican sprinter

Personal information
- Born: 20 November 1963 (age 62)

Sport
- College team: West Virginia Mountaineers
Medal record
Men's athletics
Representing Jamaica
World Championships
Bronze medal – third place	1987 Rome	4×100 m relay
Pan American Games
Bronze medal – third place	1987 Indianapolis	4×100 m relay
Commonwealth Games
Bronze medal – third place	1990 Auckland	4×100 m relay
Bronze medal – third place	1990 Auckland	4×400 m relay

John Mair (born 20 November 1963) is a Jamaican former track and field sprinter who competed in the 100 metres and 200 metres. He won several medals with the Jamaican relay team, taking Jamaica's first World Championships relay medal (a bronze) at the 1987 World Championships in Athletics, as well as a bronze medal at the Pan American Games in 1987 and two relay bronze medals at the 1990 Commonwealth Games.

He set a 100 m personal best of 10.18 seconds in 1992. He was the 1990 Jamaican champion in the 100 m and was the gold medallist at that distance at the Central American and Caribbean Championships in Athletics in 1991. He represented his country in the 100 m at the 1988 Summer Olympics, where he was also fourth in the relay.

== Career ==
Mair only reached international level of the sport at age twenty-three and did not compete at a high level in his youth. His first major competition was the 1987 Central American and Caribbean Championships in Athletics and he came away with three medals: bronze medals in the 100 m and 200 m, and a gold medal in the 4×100 metres relay. This marked the beginning of much success with the Jamaican men's relay team. At the 1987 Pan American Games the following month he was eighth in the 200 m final and claimed a bronze medal in the relay, running the anchor leg in a quartet with Ray Stewart, Andrew Smith and Clive Wright. The team regrouped for the 1987 World Championships in Athletics, with Mair leading off this time, and won another bronze medal – the first time that Jamaican men won a relay medal at the competition.

Mair made him Olympic debut at the 1988 Seoul Olympics and, after being eliminated in the quarter-finals of the individual 100 m, he joined up with Christopher Faulknor, Greg Meghoo, and Clive Wright for the relay. The team came close to their World Championship medal-winning time in the 4×100 m relay final, but ended in fourth behind the French team who were seven hundredths faster. A double bronze medal win came for Mair at the 1990 Commonwealth Games as the Jamaican men took third in both the 4×100 m relay and 4×400 metres relay (Mair and Wright ran in both teams, with Ray Stewart and Wayne Watson being in the 100 m team and Devon Morris and Howard Burnett in the longer sprint quartet). Mair also placed sixth in the semi-finals of the 100 m individually. He was the Jamaican champion over 100 m that year, interrupting a long-running streak of national titles by Ray Stewart.

Four years on from his debut year, he returned to the same competitions. He won the highest individual honour of his career at the 1991 Central American and Caribbean Championships in Athletics, taking the 100 m title, and was also a relay silver medallist. The 1991 Pan American Games followed and he placed fifth in the 100 m, but did not take a medal in the relay. The 1991 World Championships in Athletics brought together a team of Dennis Mowatt, Ray Stewart, Michael Green, and Mair on the anchor leg. The group did not reach the heights of four years earlier, but performed well with a time of 38.67 seconds to place sixth in the final.

He set a best of 10.18 seconds for the 100 m in Kingston, Jamaica that year – this was a lifetime best and the only time that he ranked in the top thirty globally for the event in his career. He did not compete at the 1992 Summer Olympics. His final international outings were a run in the early rounds of the 200 m at the 1993 IAAF World Indoor Championships, and appearances at the 1994 Commonwealth Games, where he ran in the 100 m heats and was five hundredths short of a relay medal in fourth.

== National titles ==
- Jamaican Athletics Championships
  - 100 metres: 1990

== International competitions ==
Year	Competition	Venue	Position	Event	Notes
1987	CAC Championships	Caracas, Venezuela	3rd	100 m	10.39
1987	CAC Championships	Caracas, Venezuela	3rd	200 m	20.99
1987	CAC Championships	Caracas, Venezuela	1st	4 × 100 m relay	39.45
1987	Pan American Games	Indianapolis, United States	8th	200 m	21.22
1987	Pan American Games	Indianapolis, United States	3rd	4 × 100 m relay	38.86
1987	World Championships	Rome, Italy	3rd	4 × 100 m relay	38.41
1988	Olympic Games	Seoul, South Korea	25th (qf)	100 m	10.41
1988	Olympic Games	Seoul, South Korea	4th	4 × 100 m relay	38.47
1990	Commonwealth Games	Auckland, New Zealand	14th (sf)	100 m	10.53
1990	Commonwealth Games	Auckland, New Zealand	3rd	4 × 100 m relay	39.11
1990	Commonwealth Games	Auckland, New Zealand	3rd	4 × 400 m relay	3:04.96
1990	Goodwill Games	Seattle, United States	6th	4 × 100 m relay	39.42
1990	CAC Games	Mexico City, Mexico	5th	100 m	10.50
1990	CAC Games	Mexico City, Mexico	–	4 × 100 m relay	DQ
1991	CAC Championships	Xalapa, Mexico	1st	100 m	10.56
1991	CAC Championships	Xalapa, Mexico	2nd	4 × 100 m relay	40.33
1991	Pan American Games	Havana, Cuba	5th	100 m	10.55
1991	World Championships	Tokyo, Japan	6th	4 × 100 m relay	38.67
1993	World Indoor Championships	Toronto, Canada	22nd (h)	200 m	21.86
1994	Commonwealth Games	Victoria, Canada	4th (h)	100 m	10.41
1994	Commonwealth Games	Victoria, Canada	4th	4 × 100 m relay	39.44

== See also ==
- List of 100 metres national champions (men)
- 4×100 metres relay at the World Championships in Athletics
