= Clive Wright =

Jamaican sprinter

Personal information
- Born: 18 November 1965 (age 60) Dover, Saint Mary Parish, Jamaica

Sport
- Sport: Track and field
Medal record
Representing Jamaica
World Championships
Bronze medal – third place	1987 Rome	4×100 m relay
Pan American Games
Bronze medal – third place	1987 Indianapolis	4×100 m relay
Commonwealth Games
Bronze medal – third place	1990 Auckland	4×100 m relay
Bronze medal – third place	1990 Auckland	4×400 m relay

Clive George Wright Jr. (born 18 November 1965) is a Jamaican former track and field sprinter who specialised in the 200 metres. He won several medals with the Jamaican relay team, taking Jamaica's first World Championships relay medal (a bronze) at the 1987 World Championships in Athletics, as well as a bronze medal at the Pan American Games in 1987 and two relay bronze medals at the 1990 Commonwealth Games.

He was a four-time Jamaican champion in the 200 m and held a personal best of 20.50 seconds for the distance. He represented his country in that event at the Summer Olympics in 1988 and 1992.

== Career ==
Born in Dover in Saint Mary Parish, Jamaica, he did not compete at a high level in his youth but rose to prominence at senior level at the age of twenty-one. He won his first 200 metres title at the Jamaican Athletics Championships that year and made his international debut. First came a run at the 1987 IAAF World Indoor Championships, where he narrowly missed qualifying for the 200 m final. He won double gold at the 1987 Central American and Caribbean Championships in Athletics in the 200 m and 4×100 metres relay. The 1987 Pan American Games followed and he placed fifth in the 200 m before taking a relay bronze medal as part of a quartet with Ray Stewart, Andrew Smith and John Mair. The team regrouped for the 1987 World Championships in Athletics, with Wright running the bend, and won another bronze medal – the first time that Jamaican men won a relay medal at the competition. Wright also ran individually for Jamaica and ran in the semi-finals to a career best of 20.50 seconds.

He defended his national title in the 200 m the following year and then made his Olympic debut. At the 1988 Seoul Olympics he was eliminated in the quarter-finals of the individual 200 m, then joined up with Christopher Faulknor, Greg Meghoo, and John Mair for the relay. The team came close to their World Championship medal-winning time in the 4×100 m relay final, but ended in fourth behind the French team who were seven hundredths faster. After a third straight Jamaican Championships win, he attempted a defence of his two regional titles at the 1989 Central American and Caribbean Championships in Athletics but came up two hundredths short behind host nation athlete Edgardo Guilbe in the 200 m. With the Jamaican men he managed to defend the relay title. Two bronze medals awaited Wright at the 1990 Commonwealth Games, as the Jamaican men took third in both the 4×100 m relay and 4×400 metres relay (Mair and Wright ran in both teams, with Ray Stewart and Wayne Watson being in the 100 m team and Devon Morris and Howard Burnett in the longer sprint quartet). Wright also placed seventh in the semi-finals of the 200 m individually.

After a defeat to Windell Dobson in 1991, Wright won the fourth (and last) Jamaican 200 m championship in 1992. This gained him the Jamaican Olympic team for the 1992 Barcelona Olympics. He was omitted from the relay squad, but had his best Olympic finish in the 200 m individual event, coming seventh in his semi-final. This proved to be his last season at the top level, both nationally and internationally.

Running for the Alabama Crimson Tide track and field team, Wright won the 1990 NCAA Division I Outdoor Track and Field Championships in the 4 × 100 m relay.

== National titles ==
- Jamaican Athletics Championships
  - 200 metres: 1987, 1988, 1989, 1992

== International competitions ==
Year	Competition	Venue	Position	Event	Notes
1987	World Indoor Championships	Indianapolis, United States	4th (semis)	200 m	21.73
1987	CAC Championships	Caracas, Venezuela	1st	200 m	20.64
1987	CAC Championships	Caracas, Venezuela	1st	4 × 100 m relay	39.45
1987	Pan American Games	Indianapolis, United States	5th	200 m	20.73
1987	Pan American Games	Indianapolis, United States	3rd	4 × 100 m relay	38.86
1987	World Championships	Rome, Italy	6th (semis)	200 m	20.50
1987	World Championships	Rome, Italy	3rd	4 × 100 m relay	38.41
1988	Olympic Games	Seoul, South Korea	5th (q-finals)	200 m	20.87
1988	Olympic Games	Seoul, South Korea	4th	4 × 100 m relay	38.47
1989	CAC Championships	San Juan, Puerto Rico	2nd	200 m	20.55
1989	CAC Championships	San Juan, Puerto Rico	1st	4 × 100 m relay	39.51
1990	Commonwealth Games	Auckland, New Zealand	7th (semis)	200 m	21.03
1990	Commonwealth Games	Auckland, New Zealand	3rd	4 × 100 m relay	39.11
1990	Commonwealth Games	Auckland, New Zealand	3rd	4 × 400 m relay	3:04.96
1992	Olympic Games	Barcelona, Spain	7th (semis)	200 m	20.82

== See also ==
- List of 200 metres national champions (men)
- 4×100 metres relay at the World Championships in Athletics
