= Antonio Ruiz =

Antonio Ruiz may refer to:

== People ==
- Antonio Ruíz de Morales y Molina (died 1576), Spanish bishop
- Antonio Ruiz de Montoya (1585–1652), Peruvian Jesuit missionary
  - Antonio Ruiz de Montoya University, Peruvian private university named after the missionary
- Antonio Ruíz (painter) (1892–1964), Mexican painter and scenic designer
- Antonio Ruiz (soldier) (died 1824), national hero of Argentina
- Antonio Ruiz (baseball) (born 1911), Cuban professional baseball player
- Antonio Ruiz-Pipò (1934–1997), Spanish composer
- Antonio Ruiz (footballer) (born 1937), retired Spanish football midfielder and manager
- Antoñito Ruiz (born 1951), Spanish actor
- Antonio Ruíz (sprinter) (born 1961), Mexican sprinter
- Antonio Ruiz-Rosales (born 1984), Mexican tennis player

== See also ==
- Antonio (dancer) (1921–1996), Spanish dancer born Antonio Ruiz Soler
- Antonio Hierro (born 1959), Spanish footballer born Antonio Ruiz Hierro
