= Kaoru Matsubara =

Kaoru Matsubara may refer to:

- Kaoru Matsubara (athlete) (born 1960), Japanese Olympic sprinter
- Buttercup (Kaoru Matsubara), a protagonist from the anime series Powerpuff Girls Z
