= Supas Tiprod =

Thai sprinter

Personal information
- Nationality: Thai
- Born: 4 October 1962 (age 63)

Sport
- Sport: Sprinting
- Event: 4 × 100 metres relay

Supas Tiprod (born 4 October 1962) is a Thai sprinter. He competed in the men's 4 × 100 metres relay at the 1988 Summer Olympics.
