= Andrew Mowatt =

Canadian sprinter

Personal information
- Nationality: Canadian
- Born: 24 May 1964 (age 61)

Sport
- Sport: Sprinting
- Event: 4 × 100 metres relay

Andrew Mowatt (born 24 May 1964) is a Canadian sprinter. He competed in the men's 4 × 100 metres relay at the 1988 Summer Olympics. Mowatt admitted to using performance-enhancing drugs at the Dubin Inquiry in 1989 and subsequently had his funding suspended.
