= Sung Nak-kun =

South Korean sprinter

Personal information
- Nationality: South Korean
- Born: 26 February 1962 (age 64)

Korean name
- Hangul: 성낙군
- Hanja: 成樂群
- RR: Seong Nakgun
- MR: Sŏng Nakkun

Sport
- Sport: Sprinting
- Event: 4 × 100 metres relay
Medal record
Men's athletics
Representing South Korea
Asian Championships
Bronze medal – third place	1981 Tokyo	4×100 m
Bronze medal – third place	1983 Kuwait City	4×100 m
Bronze medal – third place	1985 Jakarta	4×100 m

Sung Nak-kun (born 26 February 1962) is a South Korean sprinter. He competed in the men's 4 × 100 metres relay at the 1988 Summer Olympics.

Sung attended Busan Sports High School (부산체육고등학교) and was active in track and field there. He went on to Dong-a University, and while a student there represented South Korea at the 1980 Juniors Track World Championships and the 1983 Asian Athletics Championships. Along with Jang Jae-keun, Kim Jong-il, and Sim Deok-seop, he was part of the team which won bronze in the men's 4 × 100 metres relay at the 1986 Asian Games.

His brother Sung Nak-gap was also a competitive sprinter in the 1990s.
