= Kim Bok-seop =

South Korean sprinter

Personal information
- Nationality: South Korean
- Born: 28 October 1966 (age 59)

Sport
- Sport: Sprinting
- Event: 4 × 100 metres relay
Medal record
Men's athletics
Representing South Korea
Asian Championships
Bronze medal – third place	1985 Jakarta	4×100 m

Kim Bok-seop (born 28 October 1966) is a South Korean sprinter. He competed in the men's 4 × 100 metres relay at the 1988 Summer Olympics.
