= Ismail Asif Waheed =

Maldivian sprinter

Personal information
- Nationality: Maldivian
- Born: 13 August 1968 (age 57)

Sport
- Sport: Sprinting
- Event: 100 metres

Ismail Mohamed Asif Waheed (born 13 August 1968) is a Maldivian sprinter. Waheed competed at the 1988 Summer Olympics in Seoul, South Korea, representing Maldives in three men's athletics events. He was one of the first Maldivian athletes to compete at an Olympic Games as the nation had made their first appearance at these Summer Games.

He first competed in the heats of the men's 100 metres, having previously set a personal best in the 100 metres with a time of 11.1 seconds in 1987, but placed last in his round with a time of 11.49 seconds and did not advance further. He then competed in the heats of the men's 200 metres, again placing last in his round with a time of 23.17 and not advancing further. Finally, along with Ibrahim Manik, Abdul Razzak Aboobakur and Mohamed Hanim, he ran with the Maldivian men's 4 × 100 metres relay team; they also placed last in their round and did not advance further.
