= Anuwat Sermsiri =

Thai sprinter

Personal information
- Nationality: Thai
- Born: 10 September 1968 (age 57)

Sport
- Sport: Sprinting
- Event: 4 × 100 metres relay

Anuwat Sermsiri (born 10 September 1968) is a Thai sprinter. He competed in the men's 4 × 100 metres relay at the 1988 Summer Olympics.
