= Pierfrancesco Pavoni =

Italian sprinter

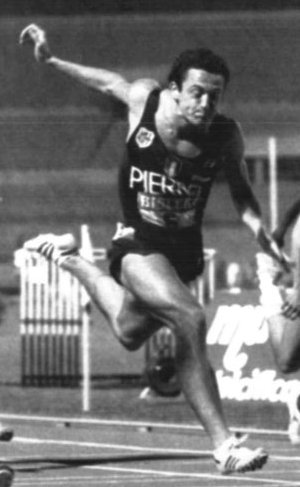
- Pavoni in the 1970s

Personal information
- Nationality: Italian
- Born: 21 February 1963 (age 63) Rome, Italy
- Height: 1.82 m (5 ft 11 1/2 in)
- Weight: 70 kg (154 lb)

Sport
- Country: Italy
- Sport: Athletics
- Event: Sprint
- Club: Pro Patria Milano

Achievements and titles
- Personal bests: 60 m: 6.55 (1990); 100 m: 10.22 (1986); 200 m: 20.38 (1987); 400 m: 45.71 (1985)
Medal record
Event	1st	2nd	3rd
World Championships	0	1	0
World Indoor Championships	0	0	2
European Championships	0	1	0
European Indoor Championships	0	2	0
Mediterranean Games	2	0	0
European Cup	0	0	3
European Junior Championships	0	0	1
World Championships
Silver medal – second place	1983 Helsinki	4×100 metres relay
European Championships
Silver medal – second place	1982 Athens	100 metres
World Indoor Championships
Bronze medal – third place	1987 Indianapolis	60 metres
Bronze medal – third place	1989 Budapest	60 metres
European Indoor Championships
Silver medal – second place	1987 Liévin	60 metres
Silver medal – second place	1990 Glasgow	60 metres
European Junior Championships
Bronze medal – third place	1981 Utrecht	100 metres
Mediterranean Games
Gold medal – first place	1993 Casablanca	100 metres
Gold medal – first place	1983 Casablanca	4x100 metres relay

Pierfrancesco Pavoni (born 21 February 1963) is a retired sprinter from Italy.

== Biography ==
He won twelve medals at the International athletics competitions, four of these with national relays team and one of these at junior level. His greatest achievements were the 1982 European Championships silver medal as well as two World Indoor bronze medals.

His personal times were both achieved in 1986: 10.22 seconds over 100 metres and in 1987: 20.38 seconds over 200 metres. At 1983 World Championships he set the Italian record of the 4 × 100 m, winning another silver medal, with the teammate Pietro Mennea at the last relay.

== International competitions ==
Representing Italy
Year	Competition	Venue	Position	Event	Result	Notes
1982	European Indoor Championships	Milan, Italy	4th	60 metres	6.68	
1982	European Championships	Athens, Greece	2nd	100 metres	10.25	(wind: -0.8 m/s)
1982	European Championships	Athens, Greece	4th	4 × 100 m relay	38.96	
1983	World Championships	Helsinki, Finland	2nd	4 × 100 metres relay	38.37	NR
1983	Mediterranean Games	Casablanca, Morocco	1st	100 metres	10.24	
1983	Mediterranean Games	Casablanca, Morocco	1st	4 × 100 metres relay	38.76	
1986	European Championships	Stuttgart, West Germany	11th (sf)	200 metres	20.85	(wind: 0.0 m/s)
1986	European Championships	Stuttgart, West Germany	5th	4 × 100 m relay	38.86	
1987	World Indoor Championships	Indianapolis, United States	3rd	60 metres	6.59	
1987	European Indoor Championships	Liévin, France	2nd	60 metres	6.58	
1987	World Championships	Rome, Italy	7th	100 metres	16.23	
1987	World Championships	Rome, Italy	7th	200 metres	20.45	PB
1987	World Championships	Rome, Italy	7th	4 × 100 metres relay	39.62	
1988	European Indoor Championships	Budapest, Hungary	5th	60 metres	6.64	
1988	Olympic Games	Seoul, South Korea	5th	4 × 100 metres relay	38.54	
1989	World Indoor Championships	Budapest, Hungary	3rd	60 metres	6.61	
1989	European Indoor Championships	The Hague, Netherlands	4th	60 metres	6.62	
1990	European Indoor Championships	Glasgow, United Kingdom	2nd	60 metres	6.59	
1990	European Championships	Split, Yugoslavia	19th (h)	100 metres	10.57	(wind: -0.9 m/s)

== National titles ==
He has won 8 times the individual national championship.

- 3 wins in the 100 metres (1982, 1983, 1987)
- 2 wins in the 200 metres (1987)
- 1 win in the 400 metres (1985)
- 2 wins in the 60 metres indoor (1985, 1987)

== See also ==
- Italian all-time lists - 100 metres
- Italian all-time lists - 200 metres
- Italy national relay team
- Italy national athletics team - More caps
