= Fritz Heer =

German sprinter

Personal information
- Full name: Fritz Werner Heer
- Nationality: German
- Born: 9 May 1959 (age 67) Bonn, West Germany
- Height: 1.75 m (5 ft 9 in)
- Weight: 70 kg (154 lb)

Sport
- Sport: Sprinting
- Event: 4 × 100 metres relay

Fritz Werner Heer (born 9 May 1959) is a German sprinter. He competed in the men's 4 × 100 metres relay at the 1988 Summer Olympics representing West Germany.
