= Fortune Ogouchi =

Beninese sprinter

Personal information
- Nationality: Beninese
- Born: 22 July 1962 (age 63)

Sport
- Sport: Sprinting
- Event: 4 × 100 metres relay

Fortune Ogouchi (born 22 July 1962) is a Beninese sprinter.

== Career ==
He competed in the men's 4 × 100 metres relay at the 1988 Summer Olympics.
