= Antonio Ruíz (sprinter) =

Mexican sprinter

Personal information
- Nationality: Mexican
- Born: 7 August 1961 (age 64)

Sport
- Sport: Sprinting
- Event: 4 × 100 metres relay

Antonio Ruíz (born 7 August 1961) is a Mexican sprinter. He competed in the men's 4 × 100 metres relay at the 1988 Summer Olympics.
