= Vladimir Muravyov (athlete) =

Soviet sprinter (born 1959)

Personal information
- Born: 30 September 1959 (age 66) Karaganda, Kazakh SSR

Sport
- Sport: Track and field
Medal record
Representing Soviet Union
Olympic Games
Gold medal – first place	1980 Moscow	4×100 m relay
Gold medal – first place	1988 Seoul	4×100 m relay
World Championships
Silver medal – second place	1987 Rome	4×100 m relay
Bronze medal – third place	1983 Helsinki	4×100 m relay
European Championships
Gold medal – first place	1986 Stuttgart	4×100 m relay
European Indoor Championships
Silver medal – second place	1981 Grenoble	50 m
Summer Universiade
Silver medal – second place	1981 Bucharest	4x100 m relay
Bronze medal – third place	1983 Edmonton	4x100 m relay

Vladimir Pavlovich Muravyov (Russian: Владимир Павлович Муравьёв) (born 30 September 1959 in ) is a former Soviet track and field athlete who competed in the sprints. He was the winner of two gold medals in 4 × 100 m relay at the Olympic Games. He was also three times Soviet champion outdoors, and two times indoor champion.

At the 1980 Summer Olympics, Vladimir Muravyov was sixth in the 100 metres final, but went out in the heats of the 200 metres, but he ran the opening leg in the Soviet 4 × 100 m relay team, which won the gold medal. At the 1982 European Championships, Muravyov was seventh in 200 m. At the first World Championships he reached the semifinal in 200 m and was a member of Soviet 4 × 100 m relay team, which won the bronze.

Muravyov missed the 1984 Summer Olympics due to the boycott. In 1985 he was second behind Poland's Marian Woronin in the European Cup, but went on to win the relay, but was sixth at the 1985 IAAF World Cup in 200 m and third in 4 × 100 m relay. He won the gold medal at the 1986 European Championships as a member of Soviet 4 × 100 m relay team.

At the 1987 World Championships, Muravyov was eliminated in the quarterfinal of 100 m, but was second with the Soviet 4 × 100 m relay team. At the 1988 Summer Olympics, Muravyov was again in the Soviet 4 × 100 m relay team, which, in the absence of United States, which was disqualified in the heats, won the gold medal.

== International competitions ==
Year	Competition	Venue	Position	Event	Time	Notes
1983	World Championships	(Finland) Helsinki	5th (sf)	200 m	20.71	wind +1.4
