= Stefano Tilli =

Italian sprinter (born 1962)

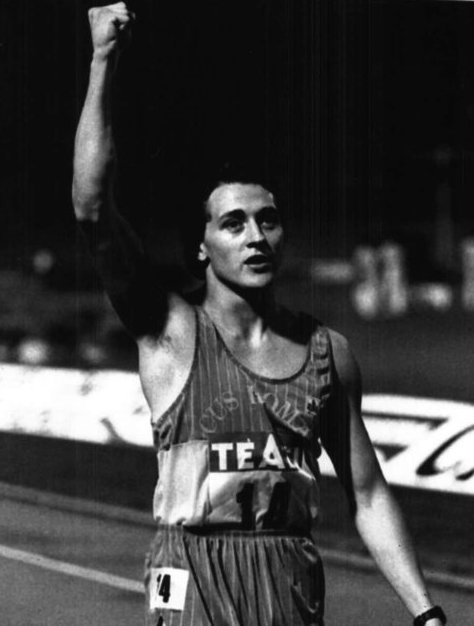
- Tilli in 1984

Personal information
- National team: Italy
- Born: 22 August 1962 (age 63) Orvieto, Italy
- Height: 1.75 m (5 ft 9 in)
- Weight: 78 kg (172 lb)

Sport
- Sport: Athletics
- Event: Sprint
- Club: Snam Gas Metano
- Coached by: Fabrizio Lepore
- Retired: 2000

Achievements and titles
- Personal bests: 100 m: 10.16 (1984); 200 m: 20.40 (1984)
Medal record
Men's athletics
Representing Italy
Event	1st	2nd	3rd
World Championships	0	1	0
European Championships	0	0	1
European Indoor Championships	2	0	0
Mediterranean Games	5	0	1
European Cup	1	2	4
Total	8	3	6
World Championships
Silver medal – second place	1983 Helsinki	4 × 100 m relay
European Championships
Bronze medal – third place	1990 Split	4 × 100 m relay
European Indoor Championships
Gold medal – first place	1983 Budapest	60 metres
Gold medal – first place	1985 Athens	200 metres
European Cup
Gold medal – first place	1983 London	4 × 100 m relay
Silver medal – second place	1989 Gateshead	4 × 100 m relay
Silver medal – second place	1991 Paris	100 metres
Bronze medal – third place	1985 Moscow	4 × 100 m relay
Bronze medal – third place	1989 Gateshead	4 × 100 m relay
Bronze medal – third place	1991 Frankfurt	200 metres
Bronze medal – third place	1991 Frankfurt	4 × 100 m relay

Stefano Tilli (born 22 August 1962) is a former Italian sprinter who specialized in the 100 and 200 m, twice European indoor champion, three-time semi-finalist at the Olympic Games, and was the world record holder in the 200 m indoor.

== Biography ==
Tilli was born in Orvieto, Umbria. In his career he won 17 medals at the International athletics competitions, eight of these with national relays team. He also won 14 national championships, from 1984 to 2000, and he has 51 caps in national team, from 1983 to 2000. His personal best in the 100 m is 10.16 seconds, which he ran in August 1984 in Zurich. His personal best in the 200 m is 20.40 seconds, achieved in September 1984 in Cagliari.

Stefano Tilli used to be engaged to the Jamaican sprinter Merlene Ottey, whom he also coached for a period.

== Record ==
=== World record ===
- 200 metres indoor: 20.52 ( (Italy) Turin, 21 February 1985) - until 22 February 1987 (Bruno Marie-Rose, France 20.36 in Liévin)

=== European record ===
- 4 × 200 metres relay: 1:21.10 ( Cagliari 29 September 1983), Italy (Stefano Tilli, Carlo Simionato, Giovanni Bongiorni, Pietro Mennea) - current holder

== Achievements ==
Year	Competition	Venue	Position	Event	Notes
Representing Italy
1983	European Indoor Championships	Budapest, Hungary	1st	60 m	6.63
1983	World Championships	Helsinki, Finland	2nd	4 × 100 m relay	38.37
1983	Mediterranean Games	Casablanca, Morocco	3rd	100 m	10.29
1983	Mediterranean Games	Casablanca, Morocco	1st	4 × 100 m relay	38.76
1984	Olympic Games	Los Angeles, United States	4th	4 × 100 m relay	38.87
1984	Olympic Games	Los Angeles, United States	SF	100 m	10.55
1984	Olympic Games	Los Angeles, United States	SF	200 m	20.72
1985	European Indoor Championships	Athens, Greece	1st	200 m	20.77
1986	European Championships	Stuttgart, West Germany	8th (sf)	200 m	20.74 (wind: 0.0 m/s)
1986	European Championships	Stuttgart, West Germany	5th	4 × 100 m relay	38.86
1987	World Championships	Rome, Italy	SF	200 m	20.86
1987	Mediterranean Games	Latakia, Syria	1st	100 m	10.41
1987	Mediterranean Games	Latakia, Syria	1st	200 m	20.76
1987	Mediterranean Games	Latakia, Syria	1st	4 × 100 m relay	39.67
1988	Olympic Games	Seoul, South Korea	5th	4 × 100 m relay	38.54
1988	Olympic Games	Seoul, South Korea	SF	200 m	20.59
1990	European Championships	Split, Yugoslavia	9th (sf)	100 m	10.40 (wind: -0.2 m/s)
1990	European Championships	Split, Yugoslavia	4th	200 m	20.66 (wind: 0.0 m/s)
1990	European Championships	Split, Yugoslavia	3rd	4 × 100 m relay	38.39
1991	World Championships	Tokyo, Japan	QF	200 m	20.92
1991	World Championships	Tokyo, Japan	5th	4 × 100 m relay	38.52
1991	Mediterranean Games	Athens, Greece	1st	200 m	20.73
1996	Olympic Games	Atlanta, United States	Heats	100 m	10.38
1997	World Championships	Athens, Greece	QF	100 m	10.36
1998	European Championships	Budapest, Hungary	4th	100 m	10.20
1999	World Championships	Sevilla, Spain	QF	100 m	10.26
2000	European Indoor Championships	Ghent, Belgium	4th	60 m	6.59
2000	Olympic Games	Sydney, Australia	QF	100 m	10.27

== National titles ==
Tilli won 14 national championships at individual senior level.

- Italian Athletics Championships
  - 100 m: 1984, 1986, 1989, 1990, 1992, 1997 (6)
  - 100 m: 1986, 1988, 1991 (3)
- Italian Athletics Indoor Championships
  - 60 m: 1995, 1996, 2000 (3)
  - 200 m: 1985, 1987 (2)

== See also ==
- Italian all-time lists - 100 metres
- Italian all-time lists - 200 metres
- Italy national relay team
- Italy national athletics team - More caps
