= Max Morinière =

French sprinter (born 1964)

Personal information
- Born: 16 February 1964 (age 62)
Medal record
Men's Athletics
Representing France
Olympic Games
Bronze medal – third place	1988 Seoul	4 × 100 m relay
World Championships
Silver medal – second place	1991 Tokyo	4 × 100 m relay
European Championships
Gold medal – first place	1990 Split	4 × 100 m relay
Representing Martinique
CARIFTA Games Junior (U20)
Gold medal – first place	1983 Fort-de-France	100 m

Max Morinière (born 16 February 1964 in Fort-de-France) is a retired French sprinter who specialized in the 100 metres.

== Biography ==
At the 1988 Summer Olympics in Seoul, he won a bronze medal in the 4 × 100 metres relay with his teammates Bruno Marie-Rose, Daniel Sangouma and Gilles Quenehervé.

At the 1990 European Championships in Split the French team of Morinière, Daniel Sangouma, Jean-Charles Trouabal and Bruno Marie-Rose improved the world record to 37.79 seconds. The record stood less than one year, as the Santa Monica Track Club from the United States team ran in 37.67 seconds at the Weltklasse Zurich meet. With 10.09 seconds he is also a former French record holder in the 100 metres.

== International competitions ==
Year	Competition	Venue	Position	Event	Notes
Representing Martinique
1983	CARIFTA Games	Fort-de-France, Martinique	1st	100 m	10.36
Representing France
1983	European Junior Championships	Schwechat, Austria	3rd	100 m	10.56
1983	European Junior Championships	Schwechat, Austria	4th	4 × 100 m relay	40.04
1987	European Indoor Championships	Liévin, France	19th (h)	60 m	6.81
1987	World Championships	Rome, Italy	16th (qf)	100 m	10.39
1988	Olympic Games	Seoul, South Korea	21st (qf)	100 m	10.37
1988	Olympic Games	Seoul, South Korea	3rd	4 × 100 m relay	38.40
1989	Jeux de la Francophonie	Casablanca, Morocco	3rd	100 m	10.29
1989	Jeux de la Francophonie	Casablanca, Morocco	1st	4 × 100 m relay	38.75
1989	World Cup	Barcelona, Spain	3rd	4 × 100 m relay	38.47^{1}
1990	European Championships	Split, Yugoslavia	5th	100 m	10.15 w (+2.2 m/s)
1990	European Championships	Split, Yugoslavia	1st	4 × 100 m relay	37.79 (WR)
1991	World Championships	Tokyo, Japan	18th (qf)	100 m	10.24
1991	World Championships	Tokyo, Japan	2nd	4 × 100 m relay	37.87
1992	Olympic Games	Barcelona, Spain	14th (sf)	100 m	10.42
1992	Olympic Games	Barcelona, Spain	7th (sf)	4 × 100 m relay	39.02
1993	Mediterranean Games	Narbonne, France	1st	4 × 100 m relay	38.96
1993	World Championships	Stuttgart, Germany	29th (qf)	100 m	10.58

^{1}Representing Europe
