= Elliot Bunney =

Personal information
- Born: Elliot John Bunney; 11 December 1966 (age 59) Edinburgh, Scotland

Rugby union career
Amateur team(s)
| Years | Team | Apps | (Points) |
| 1994- | Livingston RFC | | |
| – | Heriots RFC | | |
Medal record
Men's Athletics
Representing Great Britain
Olympic Games
| Silver medal – second place | 1988 Seoul | 4x100 m relay |
European Championships
| Bronze medal – third place | 1986 Stuttgart | 4x100 m relay |
European Junior Championships
| Gold medal – first place | 1985 Cottbus | 100 m |
| Gold medal – first place | 1985 Cottbus | 4x100 m relay |
Representing Scotland
Commonwealth Games
| Bronze medal – third place | 1986 Edinburgh | 4x100 m relay |

Elliot John Bunney (born 11 December 1966 in Edinburgh, Midlothian) is a Scottish former athlete who competed mainly in the 100 metres. He competed for Scotland at the 1986, 1990, 1994 and 1998 Commonwealth Games, winning a bronze medal in the sprint relay team competition in 1986. He competed for Great Britain in the 1988 Summer Olympics and won a Silver medal as part of the sprint relay team.

== Career ==
He won the AAA Junior championships in 1984 and 1985. He was also a Scottish 100-metre champion in 1985, 1986, 1989, 1991, 1992, and 1993. He won two Scottish 60-metre indoor titles in 1992 and 1993. In 1985 he became the first athlete to have won sprint titles in successive weeks at Scottish schools, junior and senior levels.

Elliot won two Gold medals competing for Great Britain at the 1985 European Athletics Junior Championships in Cottbus (at that time East Germany). He won the 100m (10.38sec - + 0.6) beating Endre Havas of Hungary with John Regis of Great Britain third. He was part of the winning 4 × 100 m relay team.

He was a AAAs Indoor 60-metre champion in 1987.

At the 1986 Commonwealth Games, competing for Scotland, he was a finalist in the 100 metres and finished 5th. He won a Bronze medal as part of the team that was third in the 4 x 100-metre relay.

He competed for Great Britain in the 1988 Summer Olympics held in Seoul, South Korea in the 4 x 100-metre relay where he won the silver medal with his teammates John Regis, Mike McFarlane and Linford Christie.

His personal best in the 100 metres was 10.20 seconds.

Elliot was coached throughout his career by Bob Inglis.

In 1994, he retired from top-level athletic competition aged 27 years old and played rugby for Scottish fourth division side Livingston RFC. and Heriots RFC. He also made a sevens appearance, playing for a Scottish select side at the Selkirk sevens.
