= Jean-Charles Trouabal =

French sprinter

Personal information
- Born: 20 May 1965 (age 61) Paris, France
- Height: 187 cm (6 ft 2 in)
- Weight: 77 kg (170 lb)
Medal record
Men's athletics
Representing France
World Championships
Silver medal – second place	1991 Tokyo	4×100 m relay
European Championships
Gold medal – first place	1990 Split	4×100 m relay
Gold medal – first place	1994 Helsinki	4×100 m relay
Silver medal – second place	1990 Split	200 m
Summer Universiade
Silver medal – second place	1987 Zagreb	4x100 m relay
Bronze medal – third place	1989 Duisburg	4x100 m relay
Mediterranean Games
Gold medal – first place	1993 Languedoc	4x100 m relay
Silver medal – second place	1993 Languedoc	100 m
Bronze medal – third place	1987 Latakia	200 m
Bronze medal – third place	1987 Latakia	4x100 m relay

Jean-Charles Trouabal (born 20 May 1965) is a retired French sprinter who specialized in the 200 metres.

At the 1990 European Athletics Championships in Split the French team of Max Morinière, Daniel Sangouma, Trouabal and Bruno Marie-Rose improved the world record to 37.79 seconds. The record stood less than one year, as the Santa Monica Track Club from the United States team ran in 37.67 seconds at the 1991 Weltklasse Zurich meet.

He was born on the same day (20 May 1965) as his teammate Bruno Marie-Rose.

== International competitions ==
Year	Competition	Venue	Position	Event	Notes
Representing France
1987	Universiade	Zagreb, Yugoslavia	2nd	4 × 100 m relay	39.42
1987	Mediterranean Games	Latakia, Syria	3rd	200 m	20.88 w
1988	European Indoor Championships	Budapest, Hungary	9th (sf)	200 m	21.31
1988	Olympic Games	Seoul, South Korea	25th (qf)	100 m	10.41
1989	Jeux de la Francophonie	Casablanca, Morocco	3rd	200 m	20.71
1989	Jeux de la Francophonie	Casablanca, Morocco	1st	4 × 100 m relay	38.75
1989	Universiade	Duisburg, West Germany	4th	200 m	20.68 (w)
1989	Universiade	Duisburg, West Germany	3rd	4 × 100 m relay	39.67
1990	European Championships	Split, Yugoslavia	2nd	200 m	20.31 (0.0 m/s)
1990	European Championships	Split, Yugoslavia	1st	4 × 100 m relay	37.79 (WR)
1991	World Championships	Tokyo, Japan	6th	200 m	20.58
1991	World Championships	Tokyo, Japan	2nd	4 × 100 m relay	37.87
1992	Olympic Games	Barcelona, Spain	–	200 m	DNF
1993	Mediterranean Games	Narbonne, France	2nd	100 m	10.24
1993	Mediterranean Games	Narbonne, France	1st	4 × 100 m relay	38.96
1993	World Championships	Stuttgart, Germany	6th	200 m	20.20
1993	World Championships	Stuttgart, Germany	7th (h)	4 × 100 m relay	38.94^{1}
1994	European Championships	Helsinki, Finland	5th	200 m	20.70 (-0.1 m/s)
1994	European Championships	Helsinki, Finland	1st	4 × 100 m relay	38.57
1994	World Cup	London, United Kingdom	5th	4 × 100 m relay	39.46
1995	World Championships	Gothenburg, Sweden	10th (sf)	200 m	20.58
1995	World Championships	Gothenburg, Sweden	6th (h)	4 × 100 m relay	38.82^{2}

^{1}Disqualified in the semifinals
^{2}Did not finish in the semifinals
