= Moses Musonge =

Ugandan sprinter

Personal information
- Nationality: Ugandan
- Born: 10 April 1968 (age 58)

Sport
- Sport: Sprinting
- Event: 4 × 100 metres relay

Moses Musonge (born 10 April 1968) is a Ugandan sprinter. He competed in the men's 4 × 100 metres relay at the 1988 Summer Olympics.
