= Dirk Schweisfurth =

German sprinter

Personal information
- Nationality: German
- Born: 24 October 1965 (age 60)

Sport
- Sport: Sprinting
- Event: 4 × 100 metres relay

Dirk Schweisfurth (born 24 October 1965) is a German sprinter. He competed in the men's 4 × 100 metres relay at the 1988 Summer Olympics representing West Germany.
