= Olatunji Olobia =

Nigerian sprinter (born 1969)

Personal information
- Nationality: Nigerian
- Born: 18 July 1969 (age 57)

Sport
- Sport: Sprinting
- Event: 4 × 100 metres relay

Augustine Olatunji Olobia (born 18 July 1969) is a Nigerian sprinter. He competed in the men's 4 × 100 metres relay at the 1988 Summer Olympics.

Olobia competed for the Texas Southern Tigers track and field and Washington State Cougars track and field teams in the NCAA. He also played on the Washington State Cougars football team.

Olobia was briefly signed to two NFL teams following his track career. He later worked for ING Group in Seattle. In 2019, Olobia was sentenced to one year in prison for wire fraud.
