= Gilles Quénéhervé =

French sprinter

Personal information
- Nationality: France
- Born: 17 May 1966 (age 60) Paris
- Height: 1.83 m (6 ft 0 in)
- Weight: 74 kg (163 lb)

Sport
- Sport: Running
- Events: 100 metres, 200 metres

Achievements and titles
- Personal bests: 100 m: 10.17 s (Genève 1994); 200 m: 20.16 s (Rome 1987)
Medal record
Representing France
Men's athletics
Olympic Games
Bronze medal – third place	1988 Seoul	4 × 100 m relay
World Championships
Silver medal – second place	1987 Rome	200 m

Gilles Quénéhervé (born 17 May 1966) is a retired French sprinter who specialized in the 200 metres.

== Biography ==
At the 1987 World Championships in Rome he won the silver medal in a time of 20.16, which still stood as a French record for 24 years until it was broken by Christophe Lemaitre at the 2011 World Championships in Daegu.

At the 1988 Summer Olympics in Seoul, he won a bronze medal in the 4 × 100 metres relay with his teammates Bruno Marie-Rose, Daniel Sangouma and Max Morinière.

== Achievements ==
Year	Competition	Venue	Position	Event	Notes
Representing France
1986	European Championships	Stuttgart, West Germany	18th (h)	100 m	10.56 (wind: -0.8 m/s)
1986	European Championships	Stuttgart, West Germany	4th	4 × 100 m relay	38.81
1987	World Indoor Championships	Indianapolis, United States	4th	200 m	20.97
1987	European Indoor Championships	Liévin, France	4th	200 m	20.83
1987	World Championships	Rome, Italy	2nd	200 m	20.16
1988	Olympic Games	Seoul, South Korea	6th	200 m	20.40
1988	Olympic Games	Seoul, South Korea	3rd	4 × 100 m relay	38.40
1990	European Championships	Split, Yugoslavia	10th (sf)	200 m	21.00 (wind: 0.0 m/s)
1997	World Championships	Athens, Greece	41st (h)	200 m	20.93
1997	World Championships	Athens, Greece	– (f)	4 × 100 m relay	DQ
