= Bruno Marie-Rose =

French sprinter

Personal information
- Born: 20 May 1965 (age 61) Bordeaux, France
- Height: 1.93 m (6 ft 4 in)
- Weight: 83 kg (183 lb)

Achievements and titles
- Personal bests: 100 m: 10.16 (Tours 1989); 200 m: 20.43 (Dijon 1991)
Medal record
Men's athletics
Representing France
Olympic Games
Bronze medal – third place	1988 Seoul	4 × 100 m relay
World Championships
Silver medal – second place	1991 Tokyo	4 × 100 m relay
World Indoor Championships
Silver medal – second place	1987 Indianapolis	200 m
European Championships
Gold medal – first place	1990 Split	4 × 100 m relay
Bronze medal – third place	1986 Stuttgart	100 m
European Indoor Championships
Gold medal – first place	1987 Liévin	200 m
Bronze medal – third place	1986 Madrid	60 m
Bronze medal – third place	1989 The Hague	200 m
Bronze medal – third place	1990 Glasgow	200 m
Summer Universiade
Bronze medal – third place	1987 Zagreb	100 m

Bruno Marie-Rose (born 20 May 1965) is a French retired sprinter. He was a member of the French team which set a world record in the 4 × 100 metres relay in 1990 with a time of 37.79 seconds to win the gold medal at the European Championships. He also set a world indoor record for 200 metres in 1987 with a time of 20.36 seconds to win the gold medal at the European Indoor Championships. He earned a silver medal at the 1991 World Championships and a bronze medal at the 1988 Olympic Games as a member of the French 4 × 100 m relay teams.

== Biography ==
In 1987, Marie-Rose set a world indoor record of 20.36 seconds in the 200 m to win the gold medal at the European Indoor Championships in Liévin. (The time was subsequently bettered, however, it remains the French national indoor record.) Marie-Rose also won the 200 m silver medal at the 1987 World Indoor Championships in Indianapolis.

At the 1988 Summer Olympics in Seoul, Marie-Rose won a bronze medal in the 4 × 100 m relay with his teammates Gilles Quénéhervé, Daniel Sangouma and Max Morinière. Marie-Rose also reached the final of the 200 m at the games, finishing in eighth place.

At the 1990 European Championships in Split, the French 4 × 100 m relay team of Morinière, Sangouma, Jean-Charles Trouabal and Marie-Rose set a world record of 37.79 seconds to win the gold medal. (The record was bettered the following year by the Santa Monica Track Club from the United States.) Marie-Rose also reached the final of the 100 metres at the championships, where he finished fourth.

At the 1991 World Championships in Tokyo, Marie-Rose was a member of the French team which won the silver medal in the 4 × 100 m relay.

Marie-Rose is a former French indoor record holder over 60 metres with a time of 6.56 seconds.

== International competitions ==
Year	Competition	Venue	Position	Event	Notes
Representing France
1983	European Junior Championships	Schwechat, Austria	2nd (sf)	100 m	10.44^{1}
1984	European Indoor Championships	Gothenburg, Sweden	6th	60 m	6.73
1985	World Indoor Games	Paris, France	5th	60 m	6.73
1985	European Indoor Championships	Piraeus, Greece	12th (h)	60 m	6.76
1985	Universiade	Kobe, Japan	12th (sf)	100 m	10.50
1985	Universiade	Kobe, Japan	2nd (h)	4 × 100 m relay	39.64^{1}
1986	European Indoor Championships	Madrid, Spain	3rd	60 m	6.65
1986	European Championships	Stuttgart, West Germany	3rd	100 m	10.21 (-0.1 m/s)
1986	European Championships	Stuttgart, West Germany	13th (sf)	200 m	20.97 (0.0 m/s)
1986	European Championships	Stuttgart, West Germany	4th	4 × 100 m relay	38.81
1987	European Indoor Championships	Liévin, France	6th (sf)	60 m	6.60
1987	European Indoor Championships	Liévin, France	1st	200 m	20.36 (WR)
1987	World Indoor Championships	Indianapolis, United States	2nd	200 m	20.89
1987	Universiade	Zagreb, Yugoslavia	3rd	100 m	10.25
1987	World Championships	Rome, Italy	31st (qf)	200 m	26.25
1988	Olympic Games	Seoul, South Korea	8th	200 m	20.58
1988	Olympic Games	Seoul, South Korea	3rd	4 × 100 m relay	38.40
1989	European Indoor Championships	The Hague, Netherlands	14th (sf)	60 m	6.78
1989	European Indoor Championships	The Hague, Netherlands	3rd	200 m	21.14
1989	Jeux de la Francophonie	Casablanca, Morocco	2nd	100 m	10.18
1989	Jeux de la Francophonie	Casablanca, Morocco	2nd	200 m	20.58
1989	Jeux de la Francophonie	Casablanca, Morocco	1st	4 × 100 m relay	38.75
1990	European Indoor Championships	Glasgow, United Kingdom	5th	60 m	6.66
1990	European Indoor Championships	Glasgow, United Kingdom	3rd	200 m	21.28
1990	European Championships	Split, Yugoslavia	4th	100 m	10.10 w (+2.2 m/s)
1990	European Championships	Split, Yugoslavia	19th (h)	200 m	21.46 w (+2.4 m/s)
1990	European Championships	Split, Yugoslavia	1st	4 × 100 m relay	37.79 (WR)
1991	World Championships	Tokyo, Japan	2nd	4 × 100 m relay	37.87
1994	Jeux de la Francophonie	Bondoufle, France	5th (sf)	200 m	21.14

^{1}Did not finish in the final
