= Michael Green (sprinter) =

Jamaican sprinter (born 1970)

Personal information
- Born: 7 November 1970 (age 55) Trelawny, Jamaica

Sport
- Sport: Track and field
Medal record
Representing Jamaica
Commonwealth Games
Silver medal – second place	1994 Victoria	100m
World Indoor Championships
Silver medal – second place	1997 Paris	60m

Michael Green (born 7 November 1970) is a retired Jamaican sprinter who specialized in the 100 metres. Michael Green was born in Trelawny. He attended William Knibb Memorial High and graduated in May 1989 where he dominated the 100m. Green's nickname at William Knibb was 'Roach'. After graduating from William Knibb as the fastest male in 1989, Green was awarded a scholarship to attend Clemson University. Michael Green and 100m World Record setting sprinter Usain Bolt are former students at William Knibb Memorial High School.

His personal best time is 10.02 seconds, achieved in April 1997 in Knoxville, TN. With 6.49 over the 60 metres during the 1997 indoor season he was the world top performer that year, together with Ato Boldon and Randall Evans. Green still holds the fastest first 40m split ever recorded during a 100m race—albeit by just 0.01s—ahead of Usain Bolt's 9.58s world record performance at Berlin in 2009. Thus William Knibb High includes the two fastest 40m performers ever among its alumni.

== International competitions ==
Year	Competition	Venue	Position	Event	Notes
Representing Jamaica
1991	World Championships	Tokyo, Japan	6th	4 × 100 m relay	
1994	Commonwealth Games	Victoria, Canada	2nd	100 m	
1994	Commonwealth Games	Victoria, Canada	4th	4 × 100 m relay	
1996	Olympic Games	Atlanta, United States	7th	100 m	
1997	World Indoor Championships	Paris, France	2nd	60 m	
