= Viktor Bryzghin =

Ukrainian sprinter

Personal information
- Born: 22 August 1962 (age 63) Voroshilovgrad, Ukrainian SSR, Soviet Union
- Height: 1.81 m (5 ft 11 1/2 in)
- Weight: 79 kg (174 lb)

Sport
- Country: Soviet Union
- Sport: Track and field
- Event: 4 × 100 m relay
Medal record
Men's athletics
Representing Soviet Union
Olympic Games
Gold medal – first place	1988 Seoul	4 × 100 m relay
World Championships
Silver medal – second place	1987 Rome	4 × 100 m relay
Bronze medal – third place	1983 Helsinki	4 × 100 m relay
European Championships
Gold medal – first place	1986 Stuttgart	4 × 100 m relay
Goodwill Games
Silver medal – second place	1986 Moscow	4 × 100 m relay
Bronze medal – third place	1990 Seattle	4 × 100 m relay
European Cup
Gold medal – first place	1987 Prague	4 × 100 m relay

Viktor Arkadyevich Bryzhin (Ukrainian: Віктор Аркадійович Бризгін, Russian: Виктор Аркадьевич Брызгин, Viktor Bryzgin; born 22 August 1962 in Voroshilovgrad) is a former Soviet athlete, winner of gold medal in 4 × 100 m relay at the 1988 Summer Olympics.

== Career ==
Viktor Bryzhin trained at Dynamo in Voroshilovgrad. He made his debut in the international championships at the first World Championships, where he reached to the quarterfinal of 100 m and won a bronze as a member of Soviet 4 × 100 m relay team. At the 1986 European Championships, Bryzhin was last in the final of 100 m, but won the gold in 4 × 100 m.

At the 1987 World Championships, Bryzhin finished fifth in 100 m and was second in 4 × 100 m relay. At the Seoul Olympics, Bryzhin ran the opening leg in the Soviet 4 × 100 m relay team, which, in absence of United States won the gold medal. In 1988 he was awarded the title Honoured Master of Sports of the USSR. Bryzhin made his last appearance in the international athletics scene at the 1991 World Championships, where he finished seventh with the Soviet 4 × 100 m relay team.

His wife Olha Bryzhina (née Vladykina) was also a notable athlete, winner of two gold medals at the 1988 Olympics. Together they have two daughters Yelizaveta Bryzhina and Anastasiia Bryzgina who are also a successful track and field athletes (competing for Ukraine).
