= Ezio Madonia =

Italian sprinter (born 1966)

Personal information
- Nationality: Italian
- Born: 7 August 1966 (age 59) Albenga, Italy
- Height: 1.75 m (5 ft 9 in)
- Weight: 170 kg (375 lb)

Sport
- Country: Italy
- Sport: Athletics
- Event: Sprint
- Club: Pro Patria Milano; G.S. Fiamme Gialle

Achievements and titles
- Personal bests: 100 m: 10.26 (1990); 200 m: 20.73 (1991)
Medal record
Men's athletics
Representing Italy
Event	1st	2nd	3rd
World Championships	0	0	1
European Championships	0	0	2
Mediterranean Games	3	1	0
European Cup	0	1	3
Military World Games	1	1	0
Total	4	3	6
World Championships
Bronze medal – third place	1995 Gothenburg	4 × 100 m relay
European Championships
Bronze medal – third place	1990 Split	4 × 100 m relay
Bronze medal – third place	1994 Helsinki	4 × 100 m relay
Mediterranean Games
Gold medal – first place	1987 Latakia	4 × 100 m relay
Gold medal – first place	1991 Athens	100 metres
Gold medal – first place	1991 Athens	4 × 100 m relay
Silver medal – second place	1987 Latakia	100 metres

Ezio Madonia (born 7 August 1966) is a retired Italian sprinter who specialized in the 100 metres, that won ten medals with the national relay team at the International athletics competitions and three at individual level.

He is the coach of Luminosa Bogliolo.

== Biography ==
In 4 × 100 m relay he helped win bronze medals at the 1990 European Championships in Split, 1994 European Championships in Helsinki and 1995 World Championships in Gothenburg. The relay team finished seventh at the 1987 World Championships, fifth at the 1988 Olympic Games and fifth at the 1991 World Championships.

In 100 metres he took a silver medal at the 1987 Mediterranean Games and won the 1991 Mediterranean Games. His personal best time is 10.26 seconds, achieved in June 1990 in Arzignano. In 60 metres he finished fourth at the 1992 European Indoor Championships.

== Achievements ==
Year	Competition	Venue	Position	Event	Time	Notes
1987	World Championships	(Italy) Rome	7th	4 × 100 metres relay	39.62	
1990	European Championships	(Socialist Federal Republic of Yugoslavia) Split	15th (sf)	100 metres	10.60 (wind: +0.3 m/s)	
1990	European Championships	(Socialist Federal Republic of Yugoslavia) Split	3rd	4 × 100 metres relay	38.39	
1994	European Championships	(Finland) Helsinki	28th (qf)	100 metres	10.63 (wind: -0.3 m/s)	
1994	European Championships	(Finland) Helsinki	3rd	4 × 100 metres relay	38.99	
1995	World Championships	(Sweden) Gothenburg	3rd	4 × 100 metres relay	39.07	

== National titles ==
He has won 3 times the individual national championship.

- 2 wins in the 100 metres (1991, 1993)
- 1 win in the 60 metres indoor (1992)

== See also ==
- Italy national relay team
