= Vladimir Krylov =

Soviet athlete (born 1964)

Medal record

Men's athletics

Representing Soviet Union

Olympic Games
Gold medal – first place	1988 Seoul	4×100 m

World Championships
Silver medal – second place	1987 Rome	4×100 m

European Championships
Gold medal – first place	1986 Stuttgart	200 m
Bronze medal – third place	1986 Stuttgart	4×400 m

Vladimir Valentinovich Krylov (Russian: Влади́мир Валенти́нович Крыло́в) (born 26 February 1964) is a former Soviet athlete. He was Soviet 100, 200 and 400 metres champion, and also Soviet indoor 200 metres in 1989.

He was the winner of gold medal in 4 × 100 m relay at the 1988 Summer Olympics.

A year later he was first in the European cup sprint relay, as well as third in the 100 metres.

Born in Sengiley, Sengileyevsky District, Ulyanovsk Oblast, Krylov trained at Dynamo in Ulyanovsk. He finished fifth in 400 m at the 1985 IAAF World Cup.

In the next year, at the 1986 European Championships, Krylov surprisingly won the 200 m and was third in 4 × 400 m relay. At the 1987 World Championships, he finished fifth in 200 m and was a member of Soviet 4 × 100 m relay team, which won the silver medal.

At the Seoul Olympics, Krylov reached the semifinals of 100 m, but did not start there. He was also a member of the Soviet 4 × 100 m relay team, which won the gold medal.

Krylov made his final start at the international championships at the 1990 European Championships, where he finished seventh in 100 m.
