= Salaam Gariba =

Ghanaian sprinter (born 1969)

Medal record

Men's athletics

Representing Ghana

African Championships
Silver medal – second place	1989 Lagos	100 m

Salaam Gariba (born 23 January 1969 in Tamale) is a retired Ghanaian sprinter who specialized in the 100 metres.

Gariba competed for the Villanova Wildcats track and field team in the NCAA, where he set a school record over 60 metres.

He won the silver medal at the 1989 African Championships. He reached the semi-final at the 1991 World Championships and in relay at the 1987 World Championships. He also competed at the 1993 World Championships and the 1988 Olympic Games.

His personal best time was 10.27 seconds, achieved in April 1991 in Philadelphia.
