= Kaoru Matsubara (athlete) =

Japanese sprinter

Personal information
- Nationality: Japanese
- Born: 22 February 1960 (age 66)

Sport
- Sport: Sprinting
- Event: 4 × 100 metres relay

Kaoru Matsubara (松原 薫, Matsubara Kaoru; born 22 February 1960) is a Japanese sprinter. He competed in the men's 4 × 100 metres relay at the 1988 Summer Olympics.
