= Peter Wekesa =

Kenyan sprinter

Personal information
- Nationality: Kenyan
- Born: 22 September 1961 (age 64)

Sport
- Country: Kenya
- Sport: Sprinting
- Event: 100 metres
Medal record
Men's athletics
Representing Kenya
African Championships
Silver medal – second place	1985 Cairo	4×100 m

Peter Wekesa (born 22 September 1961) is a Kenyan sprinter. He competed in the men's 100 metres at the 1988 Summer Olympics. His personal best was 10 seconds in 1988.
