= Christopher Faulknor =

Jamaican sprinter

Personal information
- Nationality: Jamaican
- Born: 12 November 1962 (age 63)

Sport
- Sport: Sprinting
- Event: 4 × 100 metres relay

Christopher Faulknor (born 12 November 1962) is a Jamaican sprinter. He competed in the men's 4 × 100 metres relay at the 1988 Summer Olympics.
