= Nelson Boateng =

Ghanaian sprinter (born 1968)

Personal information
- Born: 14 May 1968 (age 58)

Sport
- Sport: Track and field
Medal record
Representing Ghana
African Championships
Gold medal – first place	1993 Durban	4×100 m
Silver medal – second place	1988 Annaba	4×100 m
Bronze medal – third place	1989 Lagos	200 m
Bronze medal – third place	1993 Durban	100 m
Bronze medal – third place	1993 Durban	200 m

Samuel Nelson Boateng (born 14 May 1968) is a retired Ghanaian sprinter who specialized in the 200 metres.

He won the bronze medal at the 1989 African Championships. At the 1993 African Championships he won bronze medals both in the 100 and 200 metres. The same year he competed at the 1993 World Championships. He was knocked out in the semi-final, having set a career best time of 20.52 seconds in the heats. He also competed at the 1992 Olympic Games (Barcelona).

In college, he was a 2-time NCAA All-American for the Alabama Crimson Tide in the 200-metres (1993) and 4 X 100 metres Relay (1991) as a Finalist in both events.
