= Joseph Ssali =

Ugandan sprinter

Personal information
- Nationality: Ugandan
- Born: 26 December 1967
- Died: November 2003 (age 36) London, United Kingdom

Sport
- Sport: Sprinting
- Event: 100 metres

Joseph Ssali (26 December 1967 – 18 November 2003) was a Ugandan sprinter. He competed in the men's 100 metres at the 1988 Summer Olympics.
