= Lee Shiunn-long =

Taiwanese sprinter

Personal information
- Nationality: Taiwanese
- Born: 李訓榮, Pinyin: Lǐ Xùn-róng; 19 October 1958 (age 67)

Sport
- Sport: Sprinting
- Event: 100 metres

Lee Shiunn-long (born 19 October 1958) is a Taiwanese sprinter. He competed in the men's 100 metres at the 1988 Summer Olympics.
