= Cheng Hsin-fu =

Taiwanese sprinter

Personal information
- Nationality: Taiwanese
- Born: 鄭 新福, Pinyin: Zhèng Xīn-fú; 23 June 1965 (age 61)

Sport
- Sport: Sprinting
- Event: 100 metres
Medal record
Men's athletics
Representing Chinese Taipei
Asian Games
Silver medal – second place	1990 Beijing	4x100 m relay
Asian Championships
Silver medal – second place	1987 Singapore	100 m
Bronze medal – third place	1987 Singapore	200 m
Bronze medal – third place	1987 Singapore	4×100 m relay

Cheng Hsin-fu (born 23 June 1965) is a Taiwanese sprinter. He competed in the men's 100 metres at the 1988 Summer Olympics.
