= Li Feng (athlete) =

Chinese sprinter (born 1965)

Personal information
- Nationality: Chinese
- Born: 14 August 1965 (age 61)

Sport
- Sport: Sprinting
- Event: 200 metres
Medal record
Men's athletics
Representing China
Asian Games
Silver medal – second place	1986 Seoul	200 m
Asian Championships
Gold medal – first place	1989 New Delhi	4×100 m
Silver medal – second place	1987 Singapore	100 m
Silver medal – second place	1987 Singapore	4×100 m
Bronze medal – third place	1985 Jakarta	200 m

Li Feng (simplified Chinese: 李丰; traditional Chinese: 李豐; pinyin: Lǐ Fēng; born 14 August 1965) is a Chinese sprinter. He competed in the men's 200 metres at the 1988 Summer Olympics.
