= Arnaldo Abrantes (athlete, born 1961) =

Portuguese sprinter

Personal information
- Full name: Arnaldo Joaquim Castro Abrantes
- Nationality: Portuguese
- Born: 18 December 1961 (age 64) Águeda, Portugal

Sport
- Sport: Sprinting
- Event: 4 × 100 metres relay

Arnaldo Joaquim Castro Abrantes (born 18 December 1961) is a Portuguese sprinter. He competed in the men's 4 × 100 metres relay at the 1988 Summer Olympics.
