= Daniel Sangouma =

French sprinter (born 1965)

Personal information
- Full name: Daniel René Claude Sangouma
- Born: 7 February 1965 (age 61) Saint-Denis, Réunion
- Height: 1.87 m (6 ft 2 in)
- Weight: 84 kg (185 lb)

Achievements and titles
- Personal bests: 100 m : 10.02 (Villeneuve-d'Ascq 1990); 200 m : 20.20 (Casablanca 1989)
Medal record
Men's athletics
Representing France
Olympic Games
Bronze medal – third place	1988 Seoul	4 × 100 m relay
World Championships
Silver medal – second place	1991 Tokyo	4 × 100 m relay
European Championships
Gold medal – first place	1990 Split	4 × 100 m relay
Gold medal – first place	1994 Helsinki	4 × 100 m relay
Silver medal – second place	1990 Split	100 m

Daniel René Claude Sangouma (born 7 February 1965 in Saint-Denis, Réunion) is a retired French sprinter who specialized in the 100 and 200 metres.

== Biography ==
At the 1988 Summer Olympics in Seoul, he won a bronze medal in the 4 × 100 metres relay with his teammates Bruno Marie-Rose, Gilles Quenehervé and Max Morinière.

At the 1990 European Championships in Split the French team of Morinière, Sangouma, Jean-Charles Trouabal and Marie-Rose improved the world record to 37.79 seconds. The record stood less than one year, as the Santa Monica Track Club from the United States team ran in 37.67 seconds at the Weltklasse Zurich meet. With 10.02 seconds Sangouma is also a former French record holder in the 100 metres.

== International competitions ==
Year	Competition	Venue	Position	Event	Notes
Representing France
1985	World Indoor Games	Paris, France	4th	200 m	21.36
1985	European Indoor Championships	Piraeus, Greece	4th	200 m	21.13
1986	European Indoor Championships	Madrid, Spain	4th	200 m	21.78
1988	European Indoor Championships	Budapest, Hungary	6th	200 m	21.57
1988	Olympic Games	Seoul, South Korea	3rd	4 × 100 m relay	38.40
1989	World Cup	Barcelona, Spain	3rd	100 m	10.17
1989	Jeux de la Francophonie	Casablanca, Morocco	1st	100 m	10.17
1989	Jeux de la Francophonie	Casablanca, Morocco	1st	200 m	20.20
1989	Jeux de la Francophonie	Casablanca, Morocco	1st	4 × 100 m relay	38.75
1990	European Championships	Split, Yugoslavia	2nd	100 m	10.04 w (+2.2 m/s)
1990	European Championships	Split, Yugoslavia	1st	4 × 100 m relay	37.79 (WR)
1991	World Championships	Tokyo, Japan	2nd	4 × 100 m relay	37.87
1992	European Indoor Championships	Genoa, Italy	5th	60 m	6.64
1992	European Indoor Championships	Genoa, Italy	2nd	200 m	20.64
1993	Mediterranean Games	Narbonne, France	3rd	100 m	10.35
1993	Mediterranean Games	Narbonne, France	1st	200 m	20.76
1993	Mediterranean Games	Narbonne, France	1st	4 × 100 m relay	38.96
1994	European Indoor Championships	Paris, France	5th	60 m	6.65
1994	European Indoor Championships	Paris, France	1st	200 m	20.68
1994	European Championships	Helsinki, Finland	11th (sf)	200 m	20.98 (+0.5 m/s)
1994	European Championships	Helsinki, Finland	1st	4 × 100 m relay	38.57
