= Vitaliy Savin =

Kazakhstani sprinter (born 1966)

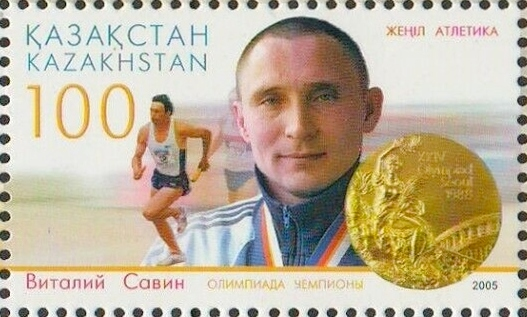
- Savin on a 2005 stamp of Kazakhstan

Personal information
- Born: 23 January 1966 (age 60) Zhezqazghan, Kazakh SSR, Soviet Union
- Height: 184 cm (6 ft 0 in)
- Weight: 65 kg (143 lb)

Sport
- Sport: Athletics
- Event: 100 m

Achievements and titles
- Personal best: 100 m – 10.08 (1992)
Medal record
Representing the Soviet Union
Olympic Games
Gold medal – first place	1988 Seoul	4 × 100 m
Representing Kazakhstan
Asian Games
Silver medal – second place	1994 Hiroshima	100 m

Vitaliy Anatolyevich Savin (Russian: Виталий Анатольевич Савин; born 23 January 1966) is a former Soviet athlete from Kazakhstan and winner of the gold medal in 4 × 100 m relay at the 1988 Summer Olympics.

At the Seoul Olympics, Vitaliy Savin reached the quarterfinal of 100 m and ran the anchoring leg in the Soviet 4 × 100 m relay team, which won the gold medal in absence of United States.

At the 1991 World Championships, Savin was again eliminated in the quarterfinals of 100 m and was seventh in 4 × 100 m. At the 1992 Summer Olympics, Savin was eliminated in the semifinal of 100 m and was fifth as a member of the Unified Team's 4 × 100 m relay team.

Savin reached the quarterfinals of the 100 m at 1993 World Championships and 1995 World Championships. His last major tournament was the 1996 Summer Olympics, where he was eliminated in the heats of 100 m.

Savin's personal best time over 100 m was 10.08 seconds, achieved in Linz on 13 August 1992.
