= Luís Barroso =

Portuguese sprinter

Personal information
- Nationality: Portuguese
- Born: 27 January 1966 (age 60) Beja, Portugal

Sport
- Sport: Sprinting
- Event: 100 metres

Luís Filipe Palma Barroso (born 27 January 1966) is a Portuguese sprinter. He competed in the men's 100 metres at the 1984 Summer Olympics.
