= Pedro Curvelo =

Portuguese sprinter

Personal information
- Nationality: Portuguese
- Born: 14 April 1960 (age 66) Coimbra, Portugal

Sport
- Sport: Sprinting
- Event: 4 × 100 metres relay

Pedro Miguel Curvelo (born 14 April 1960) is a Portuguese sprinter. He competed in the 4 × 100 metres relay at the 1988 Summer Olympics and the 1992 Summer Olympics.
