= Desai Williams =

Canadian sprinter (1959–2022)

Personal information
- Born: June 12, 1959 Basseterre, St. Kitts and Nevis
- Died: April 10, 2022 (aged 62) Mississauga, Canada

Sport
- Sport: Track and field
Medal record
Representing Canada
Olympic Games
| Bronze medal – third place | 1984 Los Angeles | 4×100 m relay |
Commonwealth Games
| Gold medal – first place | 1986 Edinburgh | 4×100 m relay |
| Silver medal – second place | 1982 Brisbane | 4×100 m relay |
Universiade
| Silver medal – second place | 1983 Edmonton | 100 metres |
| Silver medal – second place | 1983 Edmonton | 4x100 m relay |
Pacific Conference Games
| Gold medal – first place | 1981 Christchurch | 4x100 m relay |
| Silver medal – second place | 1981 Christchurch | 100 metres |
| Bronze medal – third place | 1981 Christchurch | 200 metres |
Representing Americas
World Cup
| Silver medal – second place | 1985 Canberra | 4x100 m relay |

Empson Othman Desai Williams (June 12, 1959 – April 10, 2022) was a Canadian sprinter, who won an Olympic bronze medal in 4 x 100 metres relay in Los Angeles 1984. He was born in Basseterre, St. Kitts and Nevis.

Competing at the first two World Championships, where he reached the semi-final (1983 and 1987), he set his personal best 200 metres time with 20.29 s in 1983 and his 100 metres personal best time of 10.11 s from a 6th-place finish at the 1988 Olympic Games in Seoul, South Korea.

Williams trained with the Scarborough Optimists Track Club, which was affiliated with the Ben Johnson scandal. Club coach Charlie Francis, working with Dr. Jamie Astaphan, had supplied performance-enhancing drugs to Johnson, Williams, Tony Sharpe, Angella Taylor, Mark McKoy, and others.

Williams also worked as the speed coach for the Toronto Argonauts, training Olympic athletes Tremaine Harris, Phylicia George. and Justyn Warner, among others.

Williams was fired as a coach by Athletics Canada in 2015. A probe found that Williams had violated the organization's sexual harassment policy while a coach in 2010. In 2018, he was handed a lifetime ban by Athletics Canada.

Williams died of a heart attack on April 10, 2022 at the age of 62.

== International competitions ==
Representing Canada
| Year | Competition | Venue | Position | Event | Result | Notes |
|---|---|---|---|---|---|---|
| 1983 | World Championships | Helsinki, Finland | 6th (sf) | 200 m | 20.71 | wind +3.4 |

== See also ==
- List of doping cases in athletics
