= László Karaffa =

Hungarian sprinter

Personal information
- Nationality: Hungarian
- Born: 19 July 1964 (age 61)

Sport
- Sport: Sprinting
- Event: 4 × 100 metres relay

László Karaffa (born 19 July 1964) is a Hungarian sprinter. He competed in the men's 4 × 100 metres relay at the 1988 Summer Olympics.
