= Mike McFarlane =

British sprinter (1960–2023)

Personal information
- Nationality: British (English)
- Born: 2 May 1960 Hackney, London, England
- Died: 31 May 2023 (aged 63)
- Height: 178 cm (5 ft 10 in)
- Weight: 74 kg (163 lb)

Sport
- Sport: Athletics
- Event: Sprints
- Club: Haringey AC
Medal record
Men's athletics
Representing Great Britain
Olympic Games
Silver medal – second place	1988 Seoul	4 × 100 m relay
European Championships
Bronze medal – third place	1986 Stuttgart	4 × 100 m relay
European Indoor Championships
Gold medal – first place	1985 Athens	60 m
European Junior Championships
Gold medal – first place	1979 Bydgoszcz	200 m
Silver medal – second place	1979 Bydgoszcz	4 × 100 m relay
Bronze medal – third place	1979 Bydgoszcz	100 m
Representing England
Commonwealth Games
Gold medal – first place	1982 Brisbane	200 m
Silver medal – second place	1986 Edinburgh	4 × 100 m relay
Bronze medal – third place	1986 Edinburgh	100 m

Michael Anthony McFarlane OBE (2 May 1960 – 31 May 2023) was a British athlete who competed mainly in the 100 metres and 200 metres. He won an Olympic silver medal in the 4 × 100 metres relay at the 1988 Seoul Olympics, and was the 200 m gold medallist at the 1982 Commonwealth Games and a 60 metres gold medallist at the 1985 European Athletics Indoor Championships. McFarlane won two further sprint medals at the 1986 Commonwealth Games.

== Biography ==
McFarlane lived in the London Borough of Hackney. He started out as a schoolboy winning the English schoolboys' 200 metres on three occasions. This success continued as he went on to win the AAA's junior Indoor 60/200 metre titles. This was followed by an outdoor AAA's junior 200 victory. He was also a South of England Champion and in 1979/1980 he won the European junior and AAA's Indoor 200 metre titles.

In 1980, he went to the Moscow Olympics where he ran in the 200 metres, where he got to the quarter-final. He was also a member of the sprint relay team that reached the final and finished fourth in a new British record. In 1982, after winning the U.K. championships 200, he went to his second Commonwealth Games where he won a joint Commonwealth gold alongside 1980 Olympic 100-metre champion Allan Wells in an historic and memorable 200 metres where both men could not be separated, and both claimed gold medals.

In 1984, he won the 1984 UK Athletics Championships 100 metres, then went to the Los Angeles Olympics where he reached the final of the 100 metres, and finished in fifth place. In 1985, he became European Indoor Champion at 60 metres. In 1986, he competed at his third Commonwealth games where he won bronze in the 100 metres, and silver in the sprint relay. He also reached the European 100 metre final in Stuttgart in 1986 where he finished 6th. He ran in the 100 m at the 1987 World Championships in Athletics, failing to make the final.

McFarlane competed for Great Britain in the 1988 Summer Olympics held in Seoul, South Korea in the 4 × 100 metres relay where he won the silver medal with his teammates Elliot Bunney, John Regis, and Linford Christie. He subsequently made a successful career in coaching after retirement and was a high performance coach for UK Athletics based at the National Athletics Centre in Lee Valley.

In the 2001 Birthday Honours, McFarlane was appointed Officer of the Order of the British Empire (OBE) "for services to Athletics and to The Duke of Edinburgh's Award."

McFarlane died on 31 May 2023 at the age of 63,

== Personal bests ==
- 100 metres – 10.22 seconds
- 200 metres – 20.43 seconds
