= Attila Kovács (athlete) =

Hungarian sprinter

Attila Kovács (born September 2, 1960 in Szekszárd) is a former Hungarian sprinter. He is an 11-time Hungarian 100 metre champion, and a 4-time 200 metre champion.

== Best performances ==
- 100 m: 10.09 (+0.3) in Miskolc (1987)
- 200 m: 20.11 (+0.7) in Miskolc (1987)

He also won the 60 metre Indoor title 3 times.

In 1984, he finished 2nd in 100 metres in the Friendship Games in Moscow behind Osvaldo Lara of Cuba.

In 1985 he was European cup B 100 Metre winner.

In 1986 he represented Hungary in the 100 metres in Stuttgart in the European Championships where he reached the final and finished 7th.

In 1987 he was 4th in the World Championships in the 100 metres, originally 5th but advanced one place after the disqualification of Ben Johnson of Canada.
