= Italy at the European Cup (athletics) =

Italy at the Athletics European Cup (from 2009 replaced by European Team Championships. from 2013 known as European Athletics Team Championships) has participated at all editions from 1965 European Cup (first men's final, from third edition, in 1970 European Cup).

== Participations ==
Update to 2025 European Athletics Team Championships

European Cup + European Team Championships

Men				Women				Unified				Total		
Finals	1st place, gold medalist(s)	2nd place, silver medalist(s)	3rd place, bronze medalist(s)	Finals	1st place, gold medalist(s)	2nd place, silver medalist(s)	3rd place, bronze medalist(s)	Finals	1st place, gold medalist(s)	2nd place, silver medalist(s)	3rd place, bronze medalist(s)	1st place, gold medalist(s)	2nd place, silver medalist(s)	3rd place, bronze medalist(s)
25	0	1	2	13	0	0	2	10	1	2	0	2	3	2

=== European Cup ===
Not in Super League

Team	65	67	70	73	75	77	79	81	83	85	87	89	91	93	94	95	96	97	98	99	00	01	02	03	04	05	06	07	08
Men			7		8	8	6	5	6	6	5	4	4	5	5	4	3	4	4	2	4	4	5	5	6	3	7		6
Women							8			8				8		7		4	6	5	5	6	8	8		7			6

=== European Team Championships (first division) ===
Team	09	10	11	13	14	15	17	19	21	23	25
Unified	6	7	8	7	7	6	7	4	2	1	1

== European Team Championships event podium ==
Edition	Men			Women			Mixed			Total		
Edition	1st place, gold medalist(s)	2nd place, silver medalist(s)	3rd place, bronze medalist(s)	1st place, gold medalist(s)	2nd place, silver medalist(s)	3rd place, bronze medalist(s)	1st place, gold medalist(s)	2nd place, silver medalist(s)	3rd place, bronze medalist(s)	1st place, gold medalist(s)	2nd place, silver medalist(s)	3rd place, bronze medalist(s)
(Portugal) Leiria 2009	2	0	3	1	4	2				3	4	5
(Norway) Bergen 2010	1	2	2	1	1	1				2	3	3
(Sweden) Stockholm 2011	1	0	1	0	1	2				1	1	3
(United Kingdom) Gateshead 2013	0	1	0	0	1	2				0	2	2
(Germany) Braunschweig 2014	0	1	1	0	0	2				0	1	3
(Russia) Cheboksary 2015	1	1	3	0	0	3				1	1	6
(France) Lille 2017	0	2	1	0	2	1				0	4	2
(Poland) Bydgoszcz 2019	3	2	1	1	1	4				4	3	5
(Poland) Silesia 2021	5	2	2	3	4	3				8	6	5
(Poland) Silesia 2023	5	2	3	2	4	0	0	0	0	7	6	3
(Spain) Madrid 2025	1	5	1	2	1	2	0	1	0	3	7	3

== Medals ==
Update to 2017 European Team Championships

=== By event ===
Men

event	1st place, gold medalist(s)	2nd place, silver medalist(s)	3rd place, bronze medalist(s)
100 metres	1	3	7
200 metres	1	4	4
400 metres	0	4	2
800 metres	1	5	1
1500 metres	3	2	3
3000 metres	1	0	2
5000 metres	7	1	4
10,000 metres	4	4	1
3000 metres steeplechase	8	3	4
110 metres hurdles	0	2	3
400 metres hurdles	6	1	4
High jump	0	4	2
Pole vault	1	5	1
Long jump	3	1	2
Triple jump	3	3	4
Shot put	3	5	5
Discus throw	0	0	3
Hammer throw	1	3	4
Javelin throw	0	0	2
4×100 metres relay	6	4	8
4×400 metres relay	1	3	2
	50	57	64

Women

event	1st place, gold medalist(s)	2nd place, silver medalist(s)	3rd place, bronze medalist(s)
100 metres	0	1	1
200 metres	0	1	0
400 metres	1	0	0
800 metres	0	0	1
1500 metres	0	0	1
3000 metres	1	0	0
5000 metres	0	2	0
10,000 metres	1	0	0
3000 metres steeplechase	0	0	0
100 metres hurdles	0	0	1
400 metres hurdles	0	0	2
High jump	1	2	2
Pole vault	0	0	1
Long jump	3	2	3
Triple jump	1	2	7
Shot put	0	1	5
Discus throw	0	0	0
Hammer throw	0	0	0
Javelin throw	0	0	4
4×100 metres relay	0	0	2
4×400 metres relay	0	1	1
	8	12	31

=== Men's details ===
==== Track events ====
Edition	Event	1st place, gold medalist(s)	2nd place, silver medalist(s)	3rd place, bronze medalist(s)
(Sweden) 1970 Stockholm	1500 metres	Franco Arese		
(United Kingdom) 1973 Edinburgh	100 metres		Pietro Mennea	
(France) 1975 Nice	100 metres		Pietro Mennea	
(France) 1975 Nice	200 metres	Pietro Mennea		
(France) 1975 Nice	10,000 metres			Giuseppe Cindolo
(Finland) 1979 Helsinki	100 metres	Pietro Mennea		
(Finland) 1979 Helsinki	200 metres		Pietro Mennea	
(Finland) 1979 Helsinki	3000 metres steeplechase	Mariano Scartezzini		
(Socialist Federal Republic of Yugoslavia) 1981 Zagreb	400 metres		Mauro Zuliani	
(Socialist Federal Republic of Yugoslavia) 1981 Zagreb	3000 metres steeplechase	Mariano Scartezzini		
(United Kingdom) 1983 London	200 metres		Pietro Mennea	
(United Kingdom) 1983 London	5000 metres			Alberto Cova
(United Kingdom) 1983 London	10,000 metres		Alberto Cova	
(Soviet Union) 1985 Moscow	1500 metres			Stefano Mei
(Soviet Union) 1985 Moscow	5000 metres	Alberto Cova		
(Soviet Union) 1985 Moscow	10,000 metres	Alberto Cova		
(Soviet Union) 1985 Moscow	110 metres hurdles		Daniele Fontecchio	
(Czechoslovakia) 1987 Prague	100 metres			Pierfrancesco Pavoni
(Czechoslovakia) 1987 Prague	800 metres		Donato Sabia	
(Czechoslovakia) 1987 Prague	5000 metres			Salvatore Antibo
(Czechoslovakia) 1987 Prague	10,000 metres		Salvatore Antibo	
(Czechoslovakia) 1987 Prague	3000 metres steeplechase	Francesco Panetta		
(United Kingdom) 1989 Gateshead	200 metres		Stefano Tilli	
(United Kingdom) 1989 Gateshead	1500 metres			Gennaro Di Napoli
(United Kingdom) 1989 Gateshead	5000 metres	Salvatore Antibo		
(United Kingdom) 1989 Gateshead	10,000 metres	Francesco Panetta		
(United Kingdom) 1989 Gateshead	3000 metres steeplechase	Alessandro Lambruschini		
(Germany) 1991 Frankfurt	200 metres			Stefano Tilli
(Germany) 1991 Frankfurt	1500 metres			Gennaro Di Napoli
(Germany) 1991 Frankfurt	5000 metres	Salvatore Antibo		
(Germany) 1991 Frankfurt	10,000 metres		Francesco Panetta	
(Germany) 1991 Frankfurt	3000 metres steeplechase	Alessandro Lambruschini		
(Germany) 1991 Frankfurt	400 metres hurdles			Fabrizio Mori
(Italy) 1993 Rome	800 metres		Andrea Benvenuti	
(Italy) 1993 Rome	5000 metres		Alessandro Lambruschini	
(Italy) 1993 Rome	10,000 metres		Francesco Panetta	
(Italy) 1993 Rome	3000 metres steeplechase		Francesco Panetta	
(United Kingdom) 1994 Birmingham	800 metres		Davide Cadoni	
(United Kingdom) 1994 Birmingham	10,000 metres	Francesco Panetta		
(United Kingdom) 1994 Birmingham	3000 metres steeplechase	Alessandro Lambruschini		
(France) 1995 Villeneuve d'Ascq	100 metres			Ezio Madonia
(France) 1995 Villeneuve d'Ascq	400 metres		Andrea Nuti	
(France) 1995 Villeneuve d'Ascq	800 metres			Andrea Giocondi
(France) 1995 Villeneuve d'Ascq	5000 metres	Gennaro Di Napoli		
(France) 1995 Villeneuve d'Ascq	10,000 metres	Stefano Baldini		
(France) 1995 Villeneuve d'Ascq	3000 metres steeplechase	Alessandro Lambruschini		
(France) 1995 Villeneuve d'Ascq	400 metres hurdles	Laurent Ottoz		
(Spain) 1996 Madrid	800 metres		Giuseppe D'Urso	
(Spain) 1996 Madrid	3000 metres			Alessandro Lambruschini
(Spain) 1996 Madrid	5000 metres	Gennaro Di Napoli		
(Spain) 1996 Madrid	3000 metres steeplechase		Angelo Carosi	
(Spain) 1996 Madrid	400 metres hurdles	Fabrizio Mori		
(Germany) 1997 Munich	400 metres			Marco Vaccari
(Germany) 1997 Munich	1500 metres		Gennaro Di Napoli	
(Germany) 1997 Munich	5000 metres	Gennaro Di Napoli		
(Germany) 1997 Munich	3000 metres steeplechase		Alessandro Lambruschini	
(Germany) 1997 Munich	400 metres hurdles	Fabrizio Mori		
(Russia) 1998 St. Petersburg	200 metres			Alessandro Attene
(Russia) 1998 St. Petersburg	800 metres	Andrea Longo		
(Russia) 1998 St. Petersburg	1500 metres	Giuseppe D'Urso		
(Russia) 1998 St. Petersburg	3000 metres steeplechase	Alessandro Lambruschini		
(Russia) 1998 St. Petersburg	400 metres hurdles		Fabrizio Mori	
(France) 1999 Paris	100 metres		Stefano Tilli	
(France) 1999 Paris	1500 metres	Giuseppe D'Urso		
(France) 1999 Paris	3000 metres	Salvatore Vincenti		
(France) 1999 Paris	5000 metres	Gennaro Di Napoli		
(France) 1999 Paris	3000 metres steeplechase			Giuseppe Maffei
(France) 1999 Paris	400 metres hurdles	Fabrizio Mori		
(United Kingdom) 2000 Gateshead	100 metres			Andrea Colombo
(United Kingdom) 2000 Gateshead	200 metres		Alessandro Cavallaro	
(United Kingdom) 2000 Gateshead	400 metres		Alessandro Attene	
(United Kingdom) 2000 Gateshead	3000 metres steeplechase			Giuseppe Maffei
(United Kingdom) 2000 Gateshead	110 metres hurdles		Emiliano Pizzoli	
(United Kingdom) 2000 Gateshead	400 metres hurdles			Fabrizio Mori
(West Germany) 2001 Bremen	800 metres		Andrea Longo	
(West Germany) 2001 Bremen	5000 metres			Marco Mazza
(West Germany) 2001 Bremen	400 metres hurdles	Fabrizio Mori		
(France) 2002 Annecy	100 metres			Francesco Scuderi
(France) 2002 Annecy	200 metres			Marco Torrieri
(France) 2002 Annecy	110 metres hurdles			Andrea Giaconi
(France) 2002 Annecy	400 metres hurdles	Fabrizio Mori		
(Italy) 2003 Florence	3000 metres steeplechase			Angelo Iannelli
(Italy) 2003 Florence	110 metres hurdles			Andrea Giaconi
(Poland) 2004 Bydgoszcz	200 metres			Marco Torrieri
(Poland) 2004 Bydgoszcz	3000 metres steeplechase			Giuseppe Maffei
(Italy) 2005 Florence	100 metres			Simone Collio
(Italy) 2005 Florence	110 metres hurdles			Andrea Giaconi
(Italy) 2005 Florence	400 metres hurdles			Gianni Carabelli
(Spain) 2006 Málaga	400 metres hurdles			Gianni Carabelli
(France) 2008 Annecy	400 metres		Claudio Licciardello	
(France) 2008 Annecy	5000 metres			Daniele Meucci
(Portugal) 2009 Leiria	100 metres			Emanuele Di Gregorio
(Portugal) 2009 Leiria	3000 metres			Daniele Meucci
(Norway) 2010 Bergen	100 metres			Emanuele Di Gregorio
(Norway) 2010 Bergen	1500 metres		Christian Obrist	
(Sweden) 2011 Stockholm	400 metres			Marco Vistalli
(United Kingdom) 2013 Gateshead				
(Germany) 2014 Braunschweig	800 metres			Giordano Benedetti
(Russia) 2015 Cheboksary	800 metres	Giordano Benedetti		
(Russia) 2015 Cheboksary	200 metres			Enrico Demonte
(Russia) 2015 Cheboksary	3000 metres steeplechase			Yuri Floriani
(Russia) 2015 Cheboksary	400 metres hurdles			Leonardo Capotosti
(France) 2017 Villeneuve d'Ascq	800 metres		Giordano Benedetti	
(France) 2017 Villeneuve d'Ascq	400 metres			Davide Re
(Poland) 2019 Bydgoszcz	100 metres		Marcell Jacobs	
(Poland) 2019 Bydgoszcz	200 metres		Eseosa Desalu	
(Poland) 2019 Bydgoszcz	400 metres	Davide Re		
(Poland) 2019 Bydgoszcz	5000 metres	Yeman Crippa		

==== Field events ====
Edition	Event	1st place, gold medalist(s)	2nd place, silver medalist(s)	3rd place, bronze medalist(s)
(Sweden) 1970 Stockholm	Pole vault		Renato Dionisi	
(Finland) 1979 Helsinki	Triple jump		Roberto Mazzucato	
(Socialist Federal Republic of Yugoslavia) 1981 Zagreb	High jump			Massimo Di Giorgio
(Soviet Union) 1985 Moscow	Shot put		Alessandro Andrei	
(Czechoslovakia) 1987 Prague	Shot put		Alessandro Andrei	
(United Kingdom) 1989 Gateshead	Triple jump			Dario Badinelli
(United Kingdom) 1989 Gateshead	Shot put			Alessandro Andrei
(Germany) 1991 Frankfurt	Pole vault		Gianni Iapichino	
(Germany) 1991 Frankfurt	Long jump			Giovanni Evangelisti
(Germany) 1991 Frankfurt	Shot put			Alessandro Andrei
(Germany) 1991 Frankfurt	Hammer throw			Enrico Sgrulletti
(Italy) 1993 Rome	High jump			Roberto Ferrari
(Italy) 1993 Rome	Long jump	Giovanni Evangelisti		
(Italy) 1993 Rome	Shot put		Paolo Dal Soglio	
(United Kingdom) 1994 Birmingham	Shot put	Paolo Dal Soglio		
(France) 1995 Villeneuve d'Ascq	Shot put			Paolo Dal Soglio
(Spain) 1996 Madrid	Long jump	Simone Bianchi		
(Spain) 1996 Madrid	Shot put	Paolo Dal Soglio		
(Spain) 1996 Madrid	Hammer throw			Enrico Sgrulletti
(Germany) 1997 Munich	Shot put		Corrado Fantini	
(Russia) 1998 St. Petersburg	Discus throw			Diego Fortuna
(Russia) 1998 St. Petersburg	Hammer throw			Enrico Sgrulletti
(France) 1999 Paris	Long jump			Roberto Coltri
(France) 1999 Paris	Shot put		Paolo Dal Soglio	
(France) 1999 Paris	Discus throw			Diego Fortuna
(United Kingdom) 2000 Gateshead	Triple jump		Fabrizio Donato	
(United Kingdom) 2000 Gateshead	Shot put	Paolo Dal Soglio		
(West Germany) 2001 Bremen	Triple jump			Paolo Camossi
(West Germany) 2001 Bremen	Shot put			Paolo Dal Soglio
(West Germany) 2001 Bremen	Hammer throw		Nicola Vizzoni	
(France) 2002 Annecy	Pole vault		Giuseppe Gibilisco	
(France) 2002 Annecy	Long jump		Nicola Trentin	
(France) 2002 Annecy	Triple jump		Fabrizio Donato	
(France) 2002 Annecy	Shot put			Paolo Dal Soglio
(Italy) 2003 Florence	High jump		Alessandro Talotti	
(Italy) 2003 Florence	Pole vault		Giuseppe Gibilisco	
(Italy) 2003 Florence	Triple jump	Fabrizio Donato		
(Poland) 2004 Bydgoszcz	Hammer throw			Nicola Vizzoni
(Poland) 2004 Bydgoszcz	Javelin throw			Francesco Pignata
(Italy) 2005 Florence	High jump		Nicola Ciotti	
(Italy) 2005 Florence	Pole vault	Giuseppe Gibilisco		
(Italy) 2005 Florence	Discus throw			Diego Fortuna
(Italy) 2005 Florence	Javelin throw			Francesco Pignata
(Spain) 2006 Málaga	High jump		Giulio Ciotti	
(Spain) 2006 Málaga	Pole vault		Giuseppe Gibilisco	
(Spain) 2006 Málaga	Long jump	Andrew Howe		
(Spain) 2006 Málaga	Triple jump	Fabrizio Donato		
(France) 2008 Annecy	High jump		Andrea Bettinelli	
(France) 2008 Annecy	Triple jump			Fabrizio Schembri
(France) 2008 Annecy	Hammer throw		Nicola Vizzoni	
(Portugal) 2009 Leiria	Triple jump			Fabrizio Schembri
(Portugal) 2009 Leiria	Hammer throw	Nicola Vizzoni		
(Norway) 2010 Bergen	Pole vault			Giuseppe Gibilisco
(Norway) 2010 Bergen	Hammer throw		Nicola Vizzoni	
(Sweden) 2011 Stockholm	Triple jump	Fabrizio Schembri		
(United Kingdom) 2013 Gateshead	Pole vault		Giuseppe Gibilisco	
(Germany) 2014 Braunschweig	Triple jump		Fabrizio Donato	
(Russia) 2015 Cheboksary	Triple jump	Fabrizio Donato		
(Russia) 2015 Cheboksary	High jump		Marco Fassinotti	
(France) 2017 Villeneuve d'Ascq	High jump		Marco Fassinotti	
(Poland) 2019 Bydgoszcz	High jump			Stefano Sottile
		12	25	24

==== Relay events ====
Edition	Event	1st place, gold medalist(s)	2nd place, silver medalist(s)	3rd place, bronze medalist(s)
(France) 1975 Nice	4×100 metres relay			Vincenzo Guerini; Luciano Caravani; Luigi Benedetti; Pietro Mennea
(Socialist Federal Republic of Yugoslavia) 1981 Zagreb	4×400 metres relay	Stefano Malinverni; Alfonso Di Guida; Roberto Ribaud; Mauro Zuliani		
(United Kingdom) 1983 London	4×100 metres relay	Stefano Tilli; Carlo Simionato; Giovanni Bongiorni; Pietro Mennea		
(Soviet Union) 1985 Moscow	4×100 metres relay			Antonio Ullo; Carlo Simionato; Domenico Gorla; Stefano Tilli
(Czechoslovakia) 1987 Prague	4×100 metres relay			Ezio Madonia; Giovanni Bongiorni; Paolo Catalano; Pierfrancesco Pavoni
(United Kingdom) 1989 Gateshead	4×100 metres relay			Antonio Ullo; Sandro Floris; Pierfrancesco Pavoni; Stefano Tilli
(Germany) 1991 Frankfurt	4×100 metres relay			Giorgio Marras; Carlo Simionato; Ezio Madonia; Stefano Tilli
(Germany) 1991 Frankfurt	4×400 metres relay			Marco Vaccari; Fabio Grossi; Alessandro Aimar; Andrea Nuti
(France) 1995 Villeneuve d'Ascq	4×100 metres relay			Angelo Cipolloni; Alessandro Orlandi; Ezio Madonia; Andrea Colombo
(France) 1995 Villeneuve d'Ascq	4×400 metres relay		Marco Vaccari; Fabrizio Mori; Alessandro Aimar; Andrea Nuti	
(Spain) 1996 Madrid	4×100 metres relay		Giovanni Puggioni; Ezio Madonia; Angelo Cipolloni; Sandro Floris	
(Germany) 1997 Munich	4×100 metres relay	Nicola Asuni; Giovanni Puggioni; Angelo Cipolloni; Sandro Floris		
(Germany) 1997 Munich	4×400 metres relay		Marco Vaccari; Alessandro Aimar; Fabrizio Mori; Ashraf Saber	
(Russia) 1998 St. Petersburg	4×400 metres relay		Walter Pirovano; Marco Vaccari; Edoardo Vallet; Fabrizio Mori	
(United Kingdom) 2000 Gateshead	4×100 metres relay			Marco Torrieri; Alessandro Cavallaro; Maurizio Checcucci; Andrea Colombo
(West Germany) 2001 Bremen	4×100 metres relay	Francesco Scuderi; Alessandro Cavallaro; Maurizio Checcucci; Andrea Colombo		
(France) 2002 Annecy	4×100 metres relay		Francesco Scuderi; Alessandro Cavallaro; Marco Torrieri; Stefano Dacastello	
(Italy) 2003 Florence	4×100 metres relay	Francesco Scuderi; Simone Collio; Massimiliano Donati; Alessandro Cavallaro		
(Italy) 2005 Florence	4×100 metres relay		Luca Verdecchia; Simone Collio; Marco Torrieri; Koura Kaba Fantoni	
(Spain) 2006 Málaga	4×100 metres relay		Luca Verdecchia; Stefano Anceschi; Massimiliano Donati; Francesco Scuderi	
(Spain) 2006 Málaga	4×400 metres relay			Andrew Howe; Gianni Carabelli; Luca Galletti; Andrea Barberi
(France) 2008 Annecy	4×100 metres relay			Emanuele Di Gregorio; Simone Collio; Massimiliano Donati; Maurizio Checcucci
(Portugal) 2009 Leiria	4×100 metres relay	Fabio Cerutti; Simone Collio; Emanuele Di Gregorio; Giovanni Tomasicchio		
(Norway) 2010 Bergen	4×100 metres relay	Roberto Donati; Emanuele Di Gregorio; Simone Collio; Maurizio Checcucci		
(Sweden) 2011 Stockholm				
(United Kingdom) 2013 Gateshead				
(Germany) 2014 Braunschweig	4×100 metres relay			Massimiliano Ferraro; Eseosa Desalu; Diego Marani; Delmas Obou
(Russia) 2015 Cheboksary	4×100 metres relay			Massimiliano Ferraro; Enrico Demonte; Davide Manenti; Delmas Obou
(France) 2017 Villeneuve d'Ascq				
(Poland) 2019 Bydgoszcz	4×400 metres relay	Edoardo Scotti; Matteo Galvan; Brayan Lopez; Davide Re		
		8	8	11

=== Women's details ===
European Team Championships

Edition	Event	1st place, gold medalist(s)	2nd place, silver medalist(s)	3rd place, bronze medalist(s)
(Portugal) 2009 Leiria	400 metres	Libania Grenot		
(Portugal) 2009 Leiria	800 metres		Elisa Cusma	
(Portugal) 2009 Leiria	500 metres		Silvia Weissteiner	
(Portugal) 2009 Leiria	4x400 metres relay		Daniela Reina; Maria Enrica Spacca; Marta Milani; Libania Grenot	
(Portugal) 2009 Leiria	Shot put		Chiara Rosa	
(Portugal) 2009 Leiria	High jump			Antonietta Di Martino
(Portugal) 2009 Leiria	Triple jump			Magdelín Martínez
(Norway) 2010 Bergen	High jump	Antonietta Di Martino		
(Norway) 2010 Bergen	800 metres		Elisa Cusma	
(Norway) 2010 Bergen	Shot put			Chiara Rosa
(Sweden) 2011 Stockholm	100 metres hurdles			Marzia Caravelli
(Sweden) 2011 Stockholm	Triple jump		Simona La Mantia	
(Sweden) 2011 Stockholm	Shot put			Chiara Rosa
(United Kingdom) 2013 Gateshead	High jump		Alessia Trost	
(United Kingdom) 2013 Gateshead	Triple jump		Simona La Mantia	
(United Kingdom) 2013 Gateshead	5000 metres			Margherita Magnani
(Germany) 2014 Braunschweig	5000 metres			Giulia Viola
(Germany) 2014 Braunschweig	Shot put			Chiara Rosa
(Russia) 2015 Cheboksary	400 metres			Libania Grenot
(Russia) 2015 Cheboksary	400 metres hurdles			Yadisleidy Pedroso
(Russia) 2015 Cheboksary	Triple jump			Simona La Mantia
(France) 2017 Villeneuve d'Ascq	800 metres		Yusneysi Santiusti	
(France) 2017 Villeneuve d'Ascq	400 metres hurdles		Yadisleidy Pedroso	
(France) 2017 Villeneuve d'Ascq	High jump			Alessia Trost
(Poland) 2019 Bydgoszcz	100 metres hurdles	Luminosa Bogliolo		
(Poland) 2019 Bydgoszcz	3000 metres		Marta Zenoni	
(Poland) 2019 Bydgoszcz	400 metres			Maria Benedicta Chigbolu
(Poland) 2019 Bydgoszcz	High jump			Alessia Trost
(Poland) 2019 Bydgoszcz	Triple jump			Ottavia Cestonaro
(Poland) 2019 Bydgoszcz	4x400 metres relay			Mariabenedicta Chigbolu; Ayomide Folorunso; Rebecca Borga; Giancarla Trevisan

== See also ==
- Italy national athletics team
- Italy at the European Athletics Team Championships
- Italy at the Athletics World Cup
