= Italy at the Military World Games =

ITA at the Military World Games
- Medals Ranked 4th: Gold 88 Silver 94 Bronze 115 Total 297

Military World Games appearances
- 1995; 1999; 2003; 2007; 2011; 2015; 2019; 2023

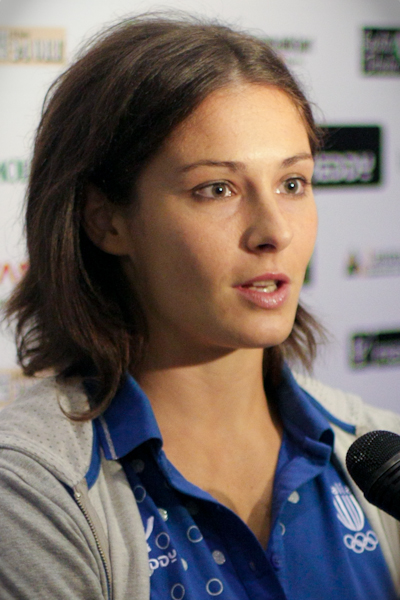
Micol Cattaneo (C.S. Carabinieri), two medals at Hyderabad 2007.

Italy at the Military World Games has participated in all editions held, since the first edition of 1995 Military World Games.

== Medal count ==
Italy won 359 medals at the Military World Games (297 at the Summer Games and 62 at the Winter Games).

Summer Games

Host nation

| Edition | Gold | Silver | Bronze | Total | Rank |
|---|---|---|---|---|---|
| (Italy) 1995 Rome | 22 | 16 | 13 | 51 | 2 |
| (Croatia) 1999 Zagreb | 16 | 20 | 21 | 57 | 3 |
| (Italy) 2003 Catania | 20 | 14 | 19 | 53 | 3 |
| (India) 2007 Hyderabad | 7 | 8 | 14 | 29 | 4 |
| (Brazil) 2011 Rio de Janeiro | 14 | 13 | 24 | 51 | 3 |
| (South Korea) 2015 Mungyeong | 5 | 11 | 12 | 28 | 9 |
| (China) 2019 Wuhan | 4 | 12 | 12 | 28 | 11 |
| Total | 88 | 94 | 115 | 297 | 4 |

== Athletics ==
=== Medals ===
| Men | | | Women | | | Total | | |
|---|---|---|---|---|---|---|---|---|
| 1st place, gold medalist(s) | 2nd place, silver medalist(s) | 3rd place, bronze medalist(s) | 1st place, gold medalist(s) | 2nd place, silver medalist(s) | 3rd place, bronze medalist(s) | 1st place, gold medalist(s) | 2nd place, silver medalist(s) | 3rd place, bronze medalist(s) |
| 15 | 13 | 8 | 2 | 7 | 6 | 17 | 20 | 14 |

=== Details ===
| Edition | Event | 1st place, gold medalist(s) | 2nd place, silver medalist(s) | 3rd place, bronze medalist(s) |
|---|---|---|---|---|
| (Italy) 1995 Rome | 100 metres | | Giovanni Puggioni | |
| (Italy) 1995 Rome | 200 metres | | Ezio Madonia | Angelo Cipolloni |
| (Italy) 1995 Rome | Marathon | Francesco Ingargiola | | |
| (Italy) 1995 Rome | 400 metres hurdles | | Fabrizio Mori | Laurent Ottoz |
| (Italy) 1995 Rome | 3000 metres steeplechase | | Angelo Carosi | |
| (Italy) 1995 Rome | High jump | Ettore Ceresoli | | |
| (Italy) 1995 Rome | 20 km road walk | Michele Didoni | | |
| (Italy) 1995 Rome | 4×100 metres relay | Milko Campus; Angelo Cipolloni; Sandro Floris; Ezio Madonia | | |
| (Italy) 1995 Rome | 4×400 metres relay | | | Ashraf Saber; Marco Chiavarini; Fabrizio Mori; Marco Vaccari |
| (Italy) 1995 Rome | 3000 metres | | | Elisa Rea |
| (Italy) 1995 Rome | | 4 | 4 | 4 |
| (Croatia) 1999 Zagreb | 200 metres | Maurizio Checcucci | Massimiliano Donati | |
| (Croatia) 1999 Zagreb | 400 metres hurdles | | Fabrizio Mori | |
| (Croatia) 1999 Zagreb | High jump | Ivan Bernasconi | | |
| (Croatia) 1999 Zagreb | Pole vault | Maurilio Mariani | | |
| (Croatia) 1999 Zagreb | Triple jump | | Paolo Camossi | |
| (Croatia) 1999 Zagreb | Shot put | Paolo Dal Soglio | | |
| (Croatia) 1999 Zagreb | Hammer throw | | Nicola Vizzoni | |
| (Croatia) 1999 Zagreb | 20 km road walk | | Marco Giungi | |
| (Croatia) 1999 Zagreb | 4×100 metres relay | Andrea Rabino; Massimiliano Donati; Maurizio Checcucci; Giovanni Puggioni | | |
| (Croatia) 1999 Zagreb | 100 metres | | | Francesca Cola |
| (Croatia) 1999 Zagreb | 3000 metres | | Elisa Rea | |
| (Croatia) 1999 Zagreb | Shot put | | | Mara Rosolen |
| (Croatia) 1999 Zagreb | | 5 | 6 | 2 |
| (Italy) 2003 Catania | Marathon | Francesco Ingargiola | | |
| (Italy) 2003 Catania | Discus throw | Diego Fortuna | | |
| (Italy) 2003 Catania | 10 km road walk | Alessandro Gandellini | | |
| (Italy) 2003 Catania | 4×100 metres relay | Stefano Bellotto; Maurizio Checcucci; Alessandro Vecchi; Gianluca Capati | | |
| (Italy) 2003 Catania | 1500 metres | | Fabio Lettieri | |
| (Italy) 2003 Catania | Hammer throw | | Ester Balassini | |
| (Italy) 2003 Catania | 5 km road walk | | Cristiana Pellino | |
| (Italy) 2003 Catania | 10,000 metres | | | Francesco Bennici |
| (Italy) 2003 Catania | Triple jump | | | Fabrizio Schembri |
| (Italy) 2003 Catania | 100 metres | | | Francesca Cola |
| (Italy) 2003 Catania | 400 metres hurdles | | | Lara Rocco |
| (Italy) 2003 Catania | | 4 | 3 | 4 |
| (India) 2007 Hyderabad | 4×100 metres relay | Alessandro Cavallaro; Simone Collio; Rosario La Mastra; Jacques Riparelli | | |
| (India) 2007 Hyderabad | 4×100 metres relay | Rita De Cesaris; Micol Cattaneo; Maria Aurora Salvagno; Anita Pistone | | |
| (India) 2007 Hyderabad | 100 metres | | Simone Collio | |
| (India) 2007 Hyderabad | 200 metres | | Alessandro Cavallaro | |
| (India) 2007 Hyderabad | Hammer throw | | Nicola Vizzoni | |
| (India) 2007 Hyderabad | 100 metres hurdles | | Micol Cattaneo | |
| (India) 2007 Hyderabad | Pole vault | | | Matteo Rubbiani |
| (India) 2007 Hyderabad | Triple jump | | | Fabrizio Schembri |
| (India) 2007 Hyderabad | Hammer throw | | | Ester Balassini |
| (India) 2007 Hyderabad | | 2 | 4 | 3 |
| (Brazil) 2011 Rio de Janeiro | Triple jump | Simona La Mantia | | |
| (Brazil) 2011 Rio de Janeiro | 100 metres hurdles | | Veronica Borsi | |
| (Brazil) 2011 Rio de Janeiro | 400 metres hurdles | | | Leonardo Capotosti |
| (Brazil) 2011 Rio de Janeiro | | 1 | 1 | 1 |
| (South Korea) 2015 Mungyeong | 200 metres | Eseosa Desalu | | |
| (South Korea) 2015 Mungyeong | 1500 metres | | Margherita Magnani | |
| (South Korea) 2015 Mungyeong | | 1 | 1 | 0 |
| (China) 2019 Wuhan | Triple jump | | Ottavia Cestonaro | |
| (China) 2019 Wuhan | | 0 | 1 | 0 |
| Total all editions | | 17 | 20 | 14 |

== See also ==
- Italy at the Olympics
- Italy at the Paralympics
- Italy at the Mediterranean Games
- Italy at the Summer Universiade
- Italy national athletics team
