= Italy national track relay team =

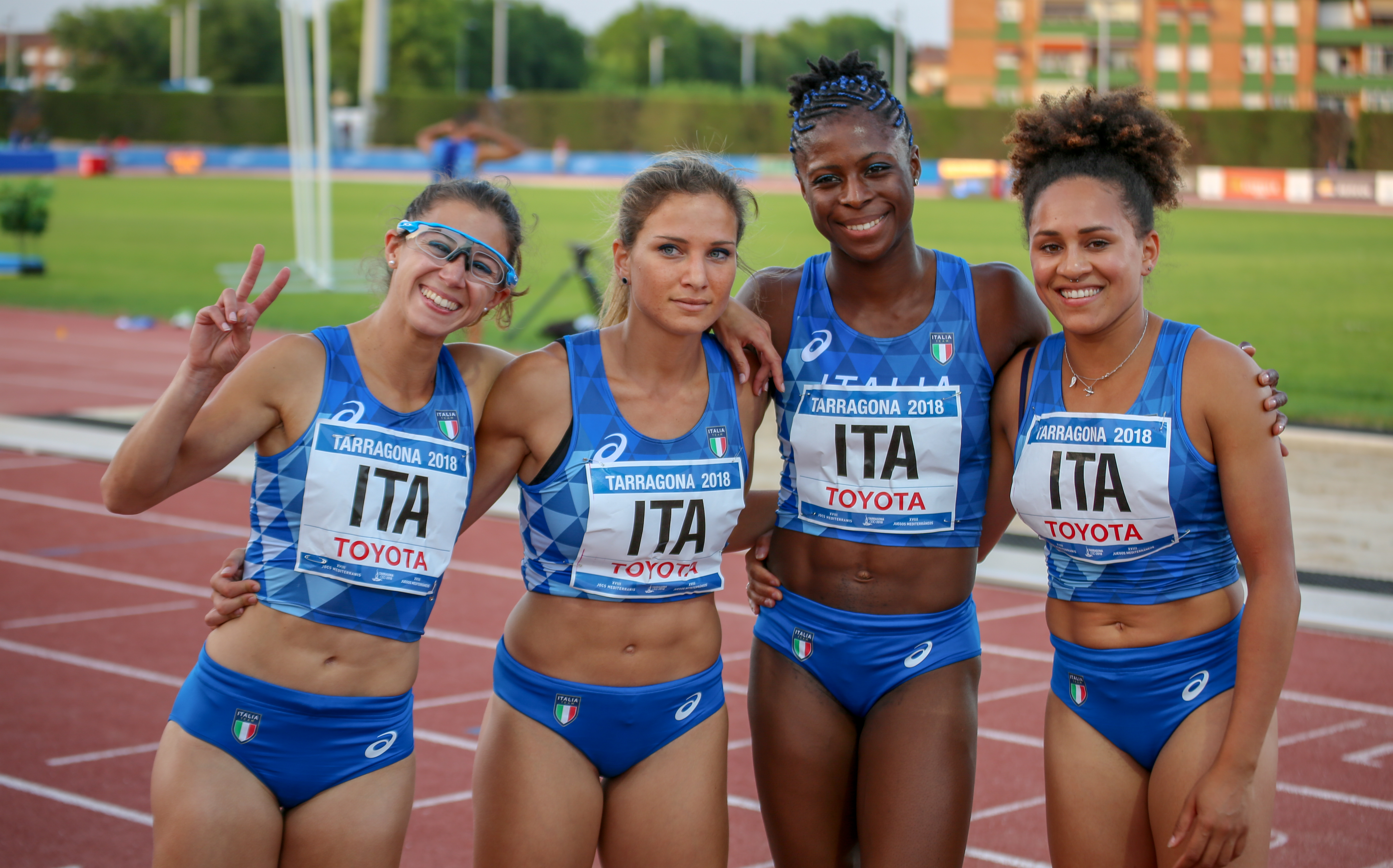
Siragusa, Bongiorni, Hooper, Herrera, the national record holders of the 4 × 100 m relay.

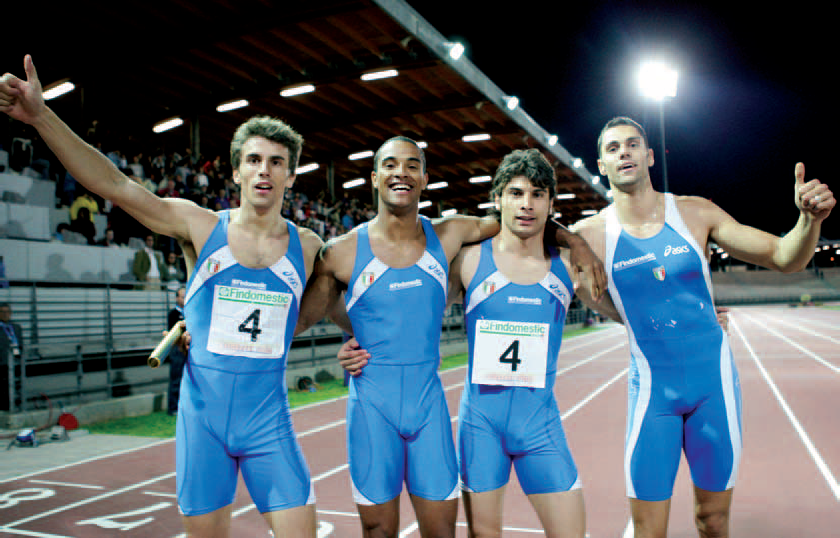
A 4 × 100 m relay Italian team, that obtained Under 23 national record, with 39.05, in Florence on 4 June 2006.

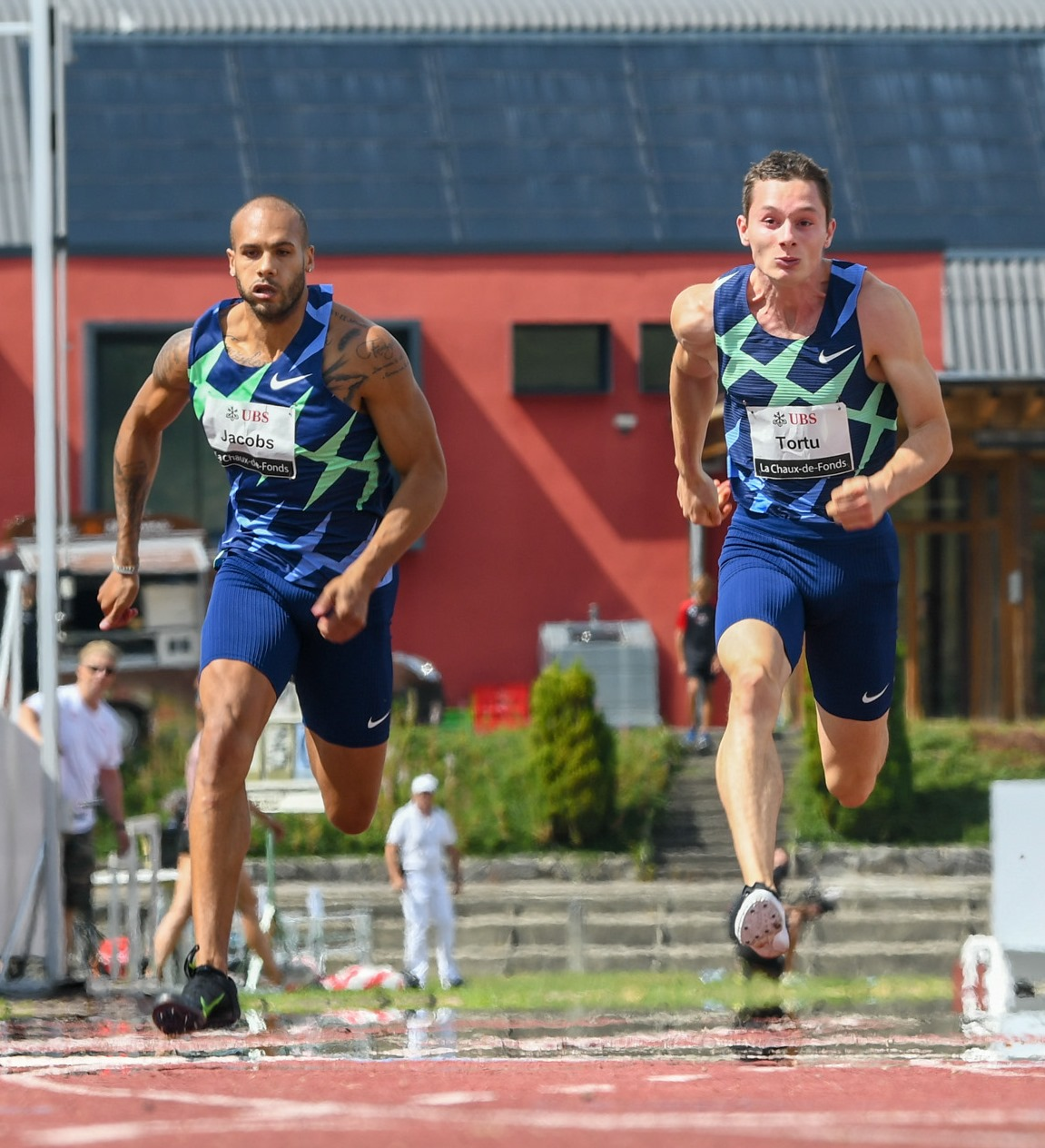
Marcell Jacobs and Filippo Tortu at Resisprint 2020.

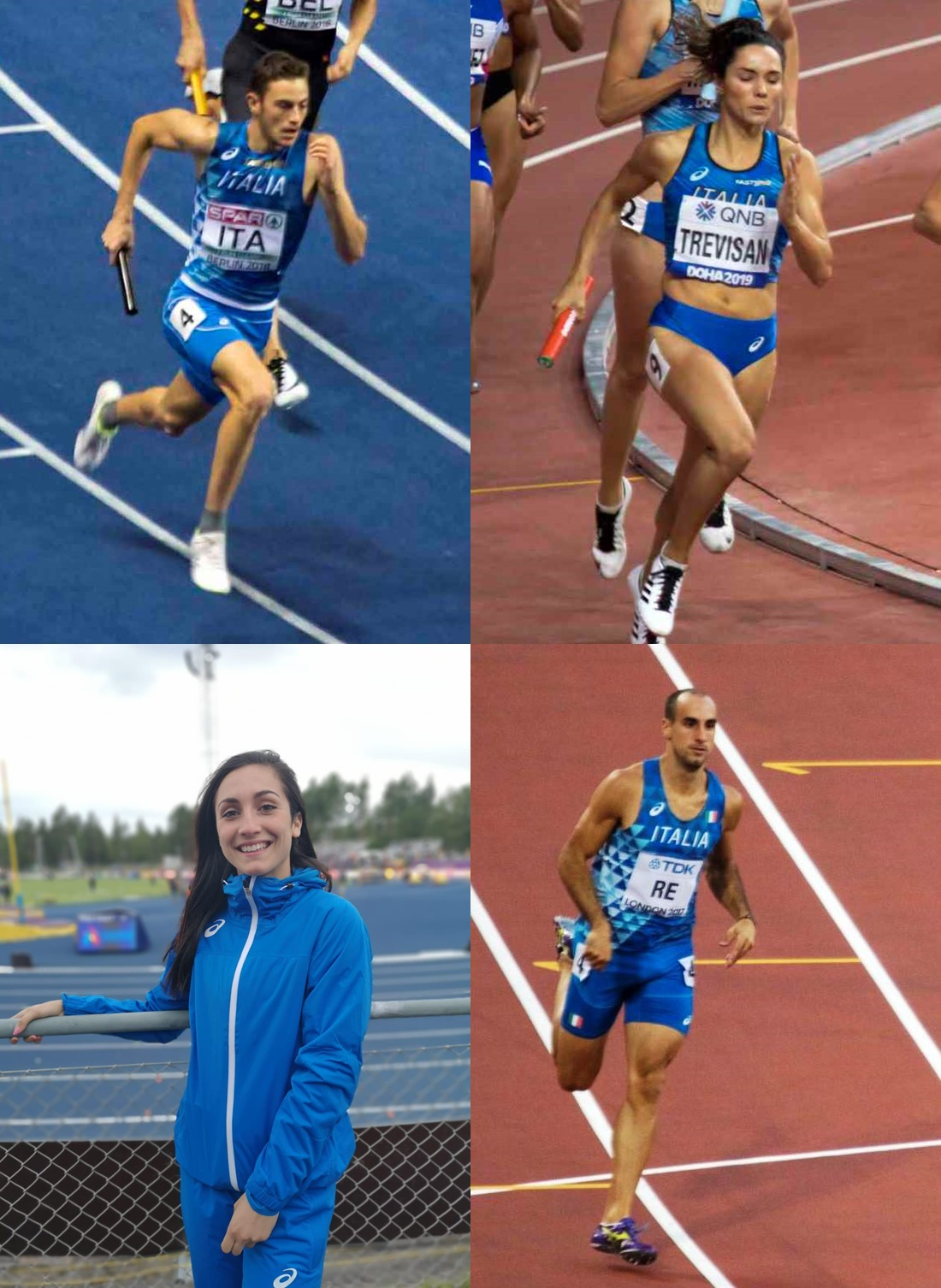
From the top left: Scotti, Trevisan, Mangione and Re, winners in the 4 × 400 m mixed relay at the 2021 World Athletics Relays.

The Italy national relay teams are the relay teams of the Italian athletics team. They compete in the 4 × 100 metres relay and 4 × 400 metres relay at outdoor international athletics competitions such as the Olympic Games and World Championships.

== Medal count ==
Key: ✓ means the category is updated as of 14 June 2024

Event	4 × 100 metres relay						4 × 400 metres relay								
Event	Men			Women			Men			Women			Mixed		
Event	Gold medal	Silver medal	Bronze medal	Gold medal	Silver medal	Bronze medal	Gold medal	Silver medal	Bronze medal	Gold medal	Silver medal	Bronze medal	Gold medal	Silver medal	Bronze medal
Olympic Games ✓ 2021	1	1	2	0	0	0	0	0	1	0	0	0	0	0	0
World Championships ✓ 2023	0	2	1	0	0	0	0	0	0	0	0	0	0	0	0
World Indoor Championships ✓ 2024	unscheduled						0	1	1	0	0	0	unscheduled		
European Championships ✓ 2024	1	2	3	0	0	3	0	2	1	0	0	1	0	1	0
European Indoor Championships ✓ 2023	unscheduled						1	1	0	0	2	2	unscheduled		
World Athletics Relays ✓ 2024	1	0	0	1	0	0	0	0	0	0	0	1	1	0	0
Universiade ✓ 2021	4	1	4	1	1	2	1	1	3	0	0	0	unscheduled		
Mediterranean Games ✓ 2022	16	1	0	3	7	4	6	3	4	6	2	0	unscheduled		
European Team Championships ✓ 2023	6	5	10	0	0	2	3	3	2	0	1	3	0	0	0
Military World Games ✓	4	0	0	1	0	0	0	0	1	0	0	0	unscheduled		
	33	12	20	6	8	11	11	11	13	6	5	7	1	1	0

== Olympic Games ==
The table shows only the times in which Italy has participated to a final.

=== 4 × 100 m relay ===
Finals

Edition	Event	Team	Position	Time
(Netherlands) Amsterdam 1928	4 × 100 m relay women	Luigia Bonfanti, Giannina Marchini, Derna Polazzo, Vittorina Vivenza	6th	53.6
(United States) Los Angeles 1932	4 × 100 m relay men	Giuseppe Castelli, Gabriele Salviati, Ruggero Maregatti, Edgardo Toetti	3rd	41.2
(Nazi Germany) Berlin 1936	4 × 100 m relay men	Gianni Caldana, Tullio Gonnelli, Orazio Mariani, Elio Ragni	2nd	41.1
(Nazi Germany) Berlin 1936	4 × 100 m relay women	Lidia Bongiovanni, Ondina Valla, Fernanda Bullano, Claudia Testoni	4th	48.7
(United Kingdom) London 1948	4 × 100 m relay men	Michele Tito, Enrico Perucconi, Antonio Siddi, Carlo Monti	3rd	41.5
(Australia) Melbourne 1956	4 × 100 m relay men	Giovanni Ghiselli, Franco Galbiati, Luigi Gnocchi, Vincenzo Lombardo	4th	40.3
(Australia) Melbourne 1956	4 × 100 m relay women	Letizia Bertoni, Milena Greppi, Giuseppina Leone, Maria Musso	5th	45.7
(Italy) Rome 1960	4 × 100 m relay men	Armando Sardi, Pier Giorgio Cazzola, Salvatore Giannone, Livio Berruti	4th	40.2
(Italy) Rome 1960	4 × 100 m relay women	Letizia Bertoni, Sandra Valenti, Piera Tizzoni, Giuseppina Leone	5th	45.6
(Japan) Tokyo 1964	4 × 100 m relay men	Livio Berruti, Ennio Preatoni, Sergio Ottolina, Pasquale Giannattasio	7th	39.5
Mexico City 1968	4 × 100 m relay men	Livio Berruti, Ennio Preatoni, Sergio Ottolina, Angelo Sguazzero	8th	39.22
(West Germany) Munich 1972	4 × 100 m relay men	Vincenzo Guerini, Ennio Preatoni, Luigi Benedetti, Pietro Mennea	8th	39.14
(Canada) Montreal 1976	4 × 100 m relay men	Vincenzo Guerini, Luciano Caravani, Luigi Benedetti, Pietro Mennea	6th	39.08
(United States) Los Angeles 1984	4 × 100 m relay men	Antonio Ullo, Stefano Tilli, Giovanni Bongiorni, Pietro Mennea	4th	38.87
(South Korea) Seul 1988	4 × 100 m relay men	Ezio Madonia, Sandro Floris, Pierfrancesco Pavoni, Stefano Tilli	5th	38.54
(Australia) Sydney 2000	4 × 100 m relay men	Francesco Scuderi, Alessandro Cavallaro, Maurizio Checcucci, Andrea Colombo	7th	38.67
(Japan) Tokyo 2020	4 × 100 m relay men	Lorenzo Patta, Marcell Jacobs, Fausto Desalu, Filippo Tortu	1st	37.50 NR
(France) Paris 2024	4 × 100 m relay men	Matteo Melluzzo, Marcell Jacobs, Lorenzo Patta, Filippo Tortu	4th	37.68 SB

=== 4 × 400 m relay ===
Edition	Event	Team	Position	Time
(France) Paris 1924	4 × 400 m relay men	Guido Cominotto, Luigi Facelli, Alfredo Gargiullo, Ennio Maffiolini	6th	3:28.0
(United States) Los Angeles 1932	4 × 400 m relay men	Giacomo Carlini, Giovanni Turba, Mario De Negri, Luigi Facelli	6th	3:17.08
Mexico City 1968	4 × 400 m relay men	Sergio Ottolina, Giacomo Puosi, Furio Fusi, Sergio Bello	7th	3:04.64
(Soviet Union) Moscow 1980	4 × 400 m relay men	Stefano Malinverni, Mauro Zuliani, Roberto Tozzi, Pietro Mennea	3rd	3:04.54
(United States) Los Angeles 1984	4 × 400 m relay men	Roberto Tozzi, Ernesto Nocco, Roberto Ribaud, Pietro Mennea	5th	3:01.44
(United States) Los Angeles 1984	4 × 400 m relay women	Patrizia Lombardo, Cosetta Campana, Marisa Masullo, Erica Rossi	6th	3:30.82
(Spain) Barcelona 1992	4 × 400 m relay men	Alessandro Aimar, Marco Vaccari, Fabio Grossi, Andrea Nuti	6th	3:02.18
(Brazil) Rio de Janeiro 2016	4 × 400 m relay women	Maria Benedicta Chigbolu, Maria Enrica Spacca, Ayomide Folorunso, Libania Grenot	6th	3:27.05
(Japan) Tokyo 2020	4 × 400 m relay men	Davide Re, Vladimir Aceti, Edoardo Scotti, Alessandro Sibilio	7th	2:58.81 NR

== World Championships ==
The table shows only the times in which Italy has participated to a final.

=== 4 × 100 m relay ===
Edition	Event	Team	Position	Time
(Finland) Helsinki 1983	4 × 100 m relay men	Stefano Tilli, Carlo Simionato, Pierfrancesco Pavoni, Pietro Mennea	2nd	38.37 NR
(Italy) Rome 1987	4 × 100 m relay men	Ezio Madonia, Domenico Gorla, Paolo Catalano, Pierfrancesco Pavoni	7th	39.62
(Japan) Tokyo 1991	4 × 100 m relay men	Mario Longo, Ezio Madonia, Sandro Floris, Stefano Tilli	5th	38.52
(Japan) Tokyo 1991	4 × 100 m relay women	Marisa Masullo, Donatella Dal Bianco, Daniela Ferrian, Rossella Tarolo	7th	43.76
(Sweden) Gothenburg 1995	4 × 100 m relay men	Giovanni Puggioni, Ezio Madonia, Angelo Cipolloni, Sandro Floris	3rd	39.07
(Germany) Berlin 2009	4 × 100 m relay men	Simone Collio, Emanuele Di Gregorio, Fabio Cerutti, Roberto Donati	6th	38.54
(South Korea) Daegu 2011	4 × 100 m relay men	Michael Tumi, Simone Collio, Emanuele Di Gregorio, Fabio Cerutti	5th	38.96
(Qatar) Doha 2019	4 × 100 m relay women	Johanelis Herrera Abreu, Gloria Hooper, Anna Bongiorni, Irene Siragusa	7th	42.98
(United States) Eugene 2022	4 × 100 m relay women	Zaynab Dosso, Dalia Kaddari, Anna Bongiorni, Vittoria Fontana	8th	42.92
(Hungary) Budapest 2023	4 × 100 m relay men	Roberto Rigali, Marcell Jacobs, Lorenzo Patta, Filippo Tortu	2nd	37.62
(Hungary) Budapest 2023	4 × 100 m relay women	Zaynab Dosso, Dalia Kaddari, Anna Bongiorni, Alessia Pavese	4th	42.49

=== 4 × 400 m relay ===
Edition	Event	Team	Position	Time
(Finland) Helsinki 1983	4 × 400 m relay men	Stefano Malinverni, Donato Sabia, Mauro Zuliani, Roberto Ribaud	5th	3:05.10
(Greece) Athens 1997	4 × 400 m relay men	Ashraf Saber, Marco Vaccari, Andrea Nuti, Fabrizio Mori	7th	3:01.52
(Greece) Athens 1997	4 × 400 m relay women	Patrizia Spuri, Francesca Carbone, Carla Barbarino, Virna De Angeli	8th	3:30.63
(Spain) Seville 1999	4 × 400 m relay women	Virna De Angeli, Patrizia Spuri, Francesca Carbone, Monika Niederstätter	8th	3:29.56
(Russia) Moscow 2013	4 × 400 m relay women	Chiara Bazzoni, Marta Milani, Maria Enrica Spacca, Libania Grenot	7th	DSQ
(Qatar) Doha 2019	4 × 400 m relay men	Davide Re, Vladimir Aceti, Matteo Galvan, Edoardo Scotti	6th	3:02.78
(United States) Eugene 2022	4 × 400 m relay women	Anna Polinari, Ayomide Folorunso, Virginia Troiani, Alice Mangione	7th	3:26.45
(Hungary) Budapest 2023	4 × 400 m relay men	Edoardo Scotti, Riccardo Meli, Lorenzo Benati, Davide Re	7th	3:01.23
(Hungary) Budapest 2023	4 × 400 m relay women	Alice Mangione, Anna Polinari, Alessandra Bonora, Giancarla Trevisan	7th	3:24.98

== World Indoor Championships ==
The table shows only the times in which Italy has reached the podium.

Edition	Event	Team	Position	Time
(Spain) Seville 1991	4 × 400 m relay men	Marco Vaccari, Vito Petrella, Alessandro Aimar, Andrea Nuti	3rd	3:05.51
(Spain) Barcelona 1995	4 × 400 m relay men	Fabio Grossi, Andrea Nuti, Roberto Mazzoleni, Ashraf Saber	2nd	3:09.12

== European Championships ==
The table shows only the times in which Italy has reached the podium.

=== 4 × 100 m relay ===
Edition	Event	Team	Position	Time
(Austria) Vienna 1938	4 × 100 m relay women	Maria Alfero, Maria Apollonio, Rosetta Cattaneo, Italia Lucchini	3rd	49.4
(Switzerland) Bern 1954	4 × 100 m relay women	Maria Musso, Giuseppina Leone, Letizia Bertoni, Milena Greppi	3rd	46.6
(Finland) Helsinki 1971	4 × 100 m relay men	Vincenzo Guerini, Pietro Mennea, Pasqualino Abeti, Ennio Preatoni	3rd	39.8
(Italy) Rome 1974	4 × 100 m relay men	Vincenzo Guerini, Norberto Oliosi, Luigi Benedetti, Pietro Mennea	2nd	38.88
(Socialist Federal Republic of Yugoslavia) Split 1990	4 × 100 m relay men	Mario Longo, Ezio Madonia, Sandro Floris, Stefano Tilli	3rd	38.39
(Finland) Helsinki 1994	4 × 100 m relay men	Ezio Madonia, Domenico Nettis, Giorgio Marras, Sandro Floris	3rd	38.99
(Spain) Barcelona 2010	4 × 100 m relay men	Roberto Donati, Simone Collio, Emanuele Di Gregorio, Maurizio Checcucci	2nd	38.17 NR
(Germany) Munich 2022	4 × 100 m relay women	Zaynab Dosso, Dalia Kaddari, Anna Bongiorni, Alessia Pavese	3rd	42.84
(Italy) Rome 2024	4 × 100 m relay men	Melluzzo, Jacobs, Patta, Tortu, Rigali (Note: He ran semifinal), Simonelli	1st	37.82 EL

=== 4 × 400 m relay ===
Edition	Event	Team	Position	Time
(Belgium) Brussels 1950	4 × 400 m relay men	Baldassarre Porto, Armando Filiput, Luigi Paterlini, Antonio Siddi	2nd	3:11.0
(Finland) Helsinki 1971	4 × 400 m relay men	Lorenzo Cellerino, Giacomo Puosi, Sergio Bello, Marcello Fiasconaro	3rd	3:04.60
(Netherlands) Amsterdam 2016	4 × 400 m relay women	Maria Benedicta Chigbolu, Maria Enrica Spacca, Chiara Bazzoni, Libania Grenot	3rd	3:27.49
(Italy) Rome 2024	4 × 400 m relay men	Sito, Aceti, Meli, Scotti, Lopez	2nd	3:00.81
(United Kingdom) Birmingham 2026	4 × 400 m relay men	Scotti, Sito, Suadassi, Benati	1st	2.58.10 NR (Note: Set in SemiFinal.)
(United Kingdom) Birmingham 2026	4 × 400 m relay women	Bonora, Polinari, Mangione, Coiro, Accame, Cirillo	3rd	3:23.57

=== Mixed 4 × 400 m relay ===
Edition	Event	Team	Position	Time
(Italy) Rome 2024	4 × 400 m relay mixed	Sito, Polinari, Scotti, Mangione	2nd	3:00.81

== European Indoor Championships ==
The table shows only the times in which Italy has reached the podium.

Edition	Event	Team	Position	Time
(West Germany) Dortmund 1966	4 × 400 m relay men	Bruno Bianchi, Ito Giani, Sergio Ottolina, Sergio Bello	2nd	3:22.2
(Belgium) Ghent 2000	4 × 400 m relay women	Francesca Carbone, Carla Barbarino, Patrizia Spuri, Virna De Angeli	2nd	3:35.01
(Austria) Vienna 2002	4 × 400 m relay women	Daniela Reina, Patrizia Spuri, Carla Barbarino, Danielle Perpoli	3rd	3:36.49
(Italy) Turin 2009	4 × 400 m relay men	Jacopo Marin, Matteo Galvan, Domenico Rao, Claudio Licciardello	1st	3:06.68
(United Kingdom) Glasgow 2019	4 × 400 m relay women	Raphaela Lukudo, Ayomide Folorunso, Chiara Bazzoni, Marta Milani	3rd	3:31.90
(Turkey) Istanbul 2023	4 × 400 m relay women	Alice Mangione, Ayomide Folorunso, Anna Polinari, Eleonora Marchiando	2nd	3:28.61 NR

== World Athletics Relays ==
Edition	Event	Team	Position	Time
(Japan) Yokohama 2019	4 × 400 m women	Chigbolu, Folorunso, Trevisan, Lukudo, Bazzoni, Vandi	3rd	3:27.74
(Poland) Silesia 2021	4 × 100 m women	Siragusa, Hooper, Bongiorni, Fontana, Herrera	1st	43.79
(Poland) Silesia 2021	4 × 400 m mixed	Scotti, Trevisan, Mangione, Re	1st	3:16.60
(Poland) Silesia 2021	4 × 100 m men	Desalu, Jacobs, Manenti, Tortu	1st	39.21

== Universiade ==
The table shows only the times in which Italy has reached the podium.

=== 4 × 100 m relay ===
Edition	Event	Team	Position	Time
(Italy) Turin 1959	4 × 100 m relay men	Guido De Murtas, Salvatore Giannone, Giorgio Mazza, Livio Berruti	1st	41.0
(Italy) Turin 1959	4 × 100 m relay women	Anna Doro, Fausta Galluzzi, Giuseppina Leone, Nadia Mecocci	2nd	43.83
(Japan) Tokyo 1967	4 × 100 m relay men	Ippolito Giani, Ennio Preatoni, Vittorio Roscio, Livio Berruti	1st	39.8
(Soviet Union) Moscow 1973	4 × 100 m relay men	Luigi Benedetti, Vincenzo Guerini, Sergio Morselli, Pietro Mennea	3rd	39.55
(Bulgaria) Sofia 1977	4 × 100 m relay men	Luciano Caravani, Stefano Curini, Pietro Farina, Stefano Rasori	2nd	39.15
Mexico City 1979	4 × 100 m relay men	Luciano Caravani, Giovanni Grazioli, Gianfranco Lazzer, Pietro Mennea	1st	38.42
(Romania) Bucharest 1981	4 × 100 m relay women	Patrizia Lombardo, Marisa Masullo, Carla Mercurio, Antonella Capriotti	3rd	44.43
(United Kingdom) Sheffield 1991	4 × 100 m relay women	Annarita Balzani, Laura Galligani, Cristina Picchi, Lara Sinico	3rd	45.24
(Japan) Fukuoka 1995	4 × 100 m relay men	Angelo Cipolloni, Andrea Colombo, Carlo Occhiena, Alessandro Orlandi	3rd	39.64
(Spain) Palma de Maiorca 1999	4 × 100 m relay men	Alessandro Attene, Andrea Colombo, Luca Verdecchia, Alessandro Orlandi	3rd	39.31
(China) Beijing 2001	4 × 100 m relay men	Andrea Colombo, Massimiliano Donati, Andrea Rabino, Luca Verdecchia	3rd	39.35
(Turkey) Izmir 2005	4 × 100 m relay men	Stefano Anceschi, Massimiliano Donati, Alessandro Rocco, Luca Verdecchia	1st	39.25
(Serbia) Belgrade 2009	4 × 100 m relay women	Audrey Alloh, Doris Tomasini, Giulia Arcioni, Maria Aurora Salvagno	1st	43.83

=== 4 × 400 m relay ===
Edition	Event	Team	Position	Time
(Italy) Turin 1959	4 × 400 m relay men	Elio Catola, Nereo Fossati, Mario Fraschini, Germano Gimelli	2nd	3:11.4
(Brazil) Porto Alegre 1963	4 × 400 m relay men	Sergio Bello, Marco Busatto, Mario Fraschini, Roberto Frinolli	3rd	3:13.65
(Hungary) Budapest 1965	4 × 400 m relay men	Sergio Bello, Gian Paolo Iraldo, Bruno Bianchi, Roberto Frinolli	1st	3:13.65
Mexico City 1979	4 × 400 m relay men	Flavio Borghi, Alfonso Di Guida, Stefano Malinverni, Roberto Tozzi	3rd	3:03.80
(United Kingdom) Sheffield 1991	4 × 400 m relay men	Gianrico Boncompagni, Riccardo Cardone, Marcello Pantone, Vito Petrella	3rd	3:07.54

== Mediterranean Games ==
The table shows only the times in which Italy has reached the podium.

=== 4 × 100 m relay ===
Edition	Event	Team	Position	Time
(Egypt) Alexandria 1951	4 × 100 m relay men	Wolfango Montanari, Franco Leccese, Antonio Siddi, Mauro Frizzoni	1st	42.4
(Spain) Barcelona 1955	4 × 100 m relay men	Sergio D'Asnasch, Giovanni Ghiselli, Luigi Gnocchi, Wolfango Montanari	1st	41.0
(Italy) Naples 1963	4 × 100 m relay men	Livio Berruti, Pasquale Giannattasio, Sergio Ottolina, Armando Sardi	1st	40.1
(Tunisia) Tunis 1967	4 × 100 m relay men	Ippolito Giani, Ennio Preatoni, Pasquale Giannattasio, Carlo Laverda	1st	40.65
(Turkey) Izmir 1971	4 × 100 m relay men	Ennio Preatoni, Pasqualino Abeti, Vincenzo Guerini, Pietro Mennea	1st	39.7
(Turkey) Izmir 1971	4 × 100 m relay women	Maddalena Grassano, Laura Nappi, Ileana Ongar, Cecilia Molinari	1st	45.6
(Algeria) Alger 1975	4 × 100 m relay men	Pasqualino Abeti, Luigi Benedetti, Luciano Caravani, Pietro Mennea	2nd	39.56
(Algeria) Alger 1975	4 × 100 m relay women	Maura Gnecchi, Laura Nappi, Lidia Mongelli, Ileana Ongar	3rd	45.92
(Socialist Federal Republic of Yugoslavia) Split 1979	4 × 100 m relay men	Gianfranco Lazzer, Luciano Caravani, Giovanni Grazioli, Pietro Mennea	1st	39.27
(Socialist Federal Republic of Yugoslavia) Split 1979	4 × 100 m relay women	Irma Galli, Patrizia Lombardo, Marisa Masullo, Laura Miano	2nd	45.32
(Morocco) Casablanca 1983	4 × 100 m relay men	Pierfrancesco Pavoni, Carlo Simionato, Stefano Tilli, Pietro Mennea	1st	38.76
(Morocco) Casablanca 1983	4 × 100 m relay women	Mary Busato, Daniela Ferrian, Marisa Masullo, Gisella Trombin	2nd	44”79
(Syria) Latakia 1987	4 × 100 m relay men	Paolo Catalano, Sandro Floris, Ezio Madonia, Stefano Tilli	1st	39.67
(Syria) Latakia 1987	4 × 100 m relay women	Anna Rita Angotzi, Annarita Balzani, Daniela Ferrian, Marisa Masullo	2nd	45.17
(Greece) Athens 1991	4 × 100 m relay men	Mario Longo, Carlo Simionato, Sandro Floris, Ezio Madonia	1st	39.12
(Greece) Athens 1991	4 × 100 m relay women	Donatella Dal Bianco, Daniela Ferrian, Marisa Masullo, Rossella Tarolo	2nd	43.67
(France) Narbonne 1993	4 × 100 m relay women	Laura Ardissone, Elisabetta Birolini, Annarita Balzani, Giuseppina Perlino	2nd	45.62
(Italy) Bari 1997	4 × 100 m relay men	Nicola Asuni, Giovanni Puggioni, Angelo Cipolloni, Sandro Floris	1st	38.61
(Italy) Bari 1997	4 × 100 m relay women	Stefania Ferrante, Giada Gallina, Manuela Levorato, Annarita Luciano	3rd	44.15
(Tunisia) Tunis 2001	4 × 100 m relay men	Francesco Scuderi, Maurizio Checcucci, Marco Torrieri, Andrea Colombo	1st	39.15
(Tunisia) Tunis 2001	4 × 100 m relay women	Francesca Cola, Manuela Grillo, Danielle Perpoli, Annarita Pistone	2nd	44.89
(Spain) Almeria 2005	4 × 100 m relay men	Luca Verdecchia, Alessandro Attene, Massimiliano Donati, Marco Torrieri	1st	39.13
(Spain) Almeria 2005	4 × 100 m relay women	Daniela Bellanova, Manuela Grillo, Elena Sordelli, Doris Tomasini	3rd	45.18
(Italy) Pescara 2009	4 × 100 m relay men	Maurizio Checcucci, Simone Collio, Emanuele Di Gregorio, Fabio Cerutti	1st	38.82
(Italy) Pescara 2009	4 × 100 m relay women	Anita Pistone, Maria Aurora Salvagno, Giulia Arcioni, Vincenza Calì	2nd	43.86
(Turkey) Mersin 2013	4 × 100 m relay men	Simone Collio, Davide Manenti, Jacques Riparelli, Michael Tumi	1st	39.06
(Turkey) Mersin 2013	4 × 100 m relay women	Micol Cattaneo, Jessica Paoletta, Ilenia Draisci, Audrey Alloh	1st	44.66
(Spain) Tarragona 2018	4 × 100 m relay men	Federico Cattaneo, Fausto Desalu, Davide Manenti, Filippo Tortu	1st	39.49
(Spain) Tarragona 2018	4 × 100 m relay women	Anna Bongiorni, Johanelis Herrera Abreu, Gloria Hooper, Irene Siragusa	3rd	43.63
(Algeria) Oran 2022	4 × 100 m relay men	Andrea Federici, Matteo Meluzzo, Diego Pettorossi, Roberto Rigali	1st	38.95
(Algeria) Oran 2022	4 × 100 m relay women	Irene Siragusa, Gloria Hooper, Aurora Berton, Johanelis Herrera Abreu	1st	43.68

=== 4 × 400 m relay ===
Edition	Event	Team	Position	Time
(Spain) Barcelona 1955	4 × 400 m relay men	Luigi Grossi, Vincenzo Lombardo, Mario Paoletti, Baldassarre Porto	2nd	3:14.4
(Tunisia) Tunis 1967	4 × 400 m relay men	Sergio Bello, Furio Fusi, Sergio Ottolina, Giacomo Puosi	1st	3.12.6
(Turkey) Izmir 1971	4 × 400 m relay men	Sergio Bello, Daniele Giovanardi, Lorenzo Cellerino, Giacomo Puosi	1st	3:07.5
(Algeria) Alger 1975	4 × 400 m relay men	Alfonso Di Guida, Flavio Borghi, Bruno Magnani, Giorgio Ballati	3rd	3:06.72
(Socialist Federal Republic of Yugoslavia) Split 1979	4 × 400 m relay men	Alfonso Di Guida, Flavio Borghi, Stefano Malinverni, Roberto Tozzi	3rd	3:04.61
(Morocco) Casablanca 1983	4 × 400 m relay men	Roberto Ribaud, Donato Sabia, Mauro Zuliani, Daniele D'Amico	2nd	3:04.54
(Morocco) Casablanca 1983	4 × 400 m relay women	Cosetta Campana, Giuseppina Cirulli, Letizia Magenti, Erica Rossi	1st	3:33.63
(Syria) Latakia 1987	4 × 400 m relay men	Roberto Ribaud, Andrea Montanari, Vito Petrella, Marcello Pantone	1st	3:05.29
(Syria) Latakia 1987	4 × 400 m relay women	Cosetta Campana, Giuseppina Cirulli, Nevia Pristino, Erica Rossi	1st	3:32.14
(Greece) Athens 1991	4 × 400 m relay men	Fabio Grossi, Andrea Nuti, Marco Vaccari, Alessandro Aimar	1st	3:03.20
(Greece) Athens 1991	4 × 400 m relay women	Cosetta Campana, Barbara Martinelli, Roberta Rabaioli, Johanna Zuddas	2nd	3:33.68
(France) Narbonne 1993	4 × 400 m relay men	Maurizio Federici, Gianrico Boncompagni, Vito Petrella, Alessandro Aimar	3rd	3.05.11
(Italy) Bari 1997	4 × 400 m relay men	Michele Grando, Walter Groff, Fabrizio Mori, Ashraf Saber	3rd	3:03.08
(Italy) Bari 1997	4 × 400 m relay women	Carla Barbarino, Francesca Carbone, Francesca Cola, Patrizia Spuri	1st	3:29.98
(Tunisia) Tunis 2001	4 × 400 m relay women	Francesca Carbone, Danielle Perpoli, Fabiola Piroddi, Daniela Reina	2nd	3:38.90
(Turkey) Mersin 2013	4 × 400 m relay men	Lorenzo Valentini, Isalbet Juarez, Michele Tricca, Matteo Galvan	1st	3:04.61
(Turkey) Mersin 2013	4 × 400 m relay women	Maria Enrica Spacca, Elena Maria Bonfanti, Maria Benedicta Chigbolu, Chiara Bazzoni	1st	3:32.44
(Spain) Tarragona 2018	4 × 400 m relay men	Matteo Galvan, Giuseppe Leonardi, Davide Re, Michele Tricca	1st	3:03.54
(Spain) Tarragona 2018	4 × 400 m relay women	Benedicta Chigbolu, Ayomide Folorunso, Libania Grenot, Raphaela Lukudo	1st	3:28.08
(Algeria) Oran 2022	4 × 400 m relay men	Pietro Pivotto, Giuseppe Leonardi, Lapo Bianciardi, Matteo Raimondi	2nd	3:04.55
(Algeria) Oran 2022	4 × 400 m relay women	Anna Polinari, Virginia Troiani, Raphaela Lukudo, Giancarla Trevisan	1st	3:29.93

== European Team Championships ==
The table shows only the times in which Italy has reached the podium just in European Cup Super League and, from 2009, at the European Team Championships.

=== 4 × 100 m relay ===
Edition	Event	Team	Position	Time
(France) Nice 1975	4 × 100 m relay men	Vincenzo Guerini, Luciano Caravani, Luigi Benedetti, Pietro Mennea	3rd	39.32
(United Kingdom) London 1983	4 × 100 m relay men	Stefano Tilli, Carlo Simionato, Giovanni Bongiorni, Pietro Mennea	1st	38.86
(Soviet Union) Moscow 1985	4 × 100 m relay men	Antonio Ullo, Carlo Simionato, Domenico Gorla, Stefano Tilli	3rd	38.88
(Czechoslovakia) Prague 1987	4 × 100 m relay men	Ezio Madonia, Giovanni Bongiorni, Paolo Catalano, Pierfrancesco Pavoni	3rd	39.98
(United Kingdom) Gateshead 1989	4 × 100 m relay men	Antonio Ullo, Sandro Floris, Pierfrancesco Pavoni, Stefano Tilli	3rd	38.98
(Germany) Frankfurt 1991	4 × 100 m relay men	Giorgio Marras, Carlo Simionato, Ezio Madonia, Stefano Tilli	3rd	38.89
(France) Villeneuve-d'Ascq 1995	4 × 100 m relay men	Angelo Cipolloni, Alessandro Orlandi, Ezio Madonia, Andrea Colombo	3rd	39.19
(Spain) Madrid 1996	4 × 100 m relay men	Giovanni Puggioni, Ezio Madonia, Angelo Cipolloni, Sandro Floris	2nd	38.66
(Germany) Munich 1997	4 × 100 m relay men	Nicola Asuni, Giovanni Puggioni, Angelo Cipolloni, Sandro Floris	1st	38.80
(United Kingdom) Gateshead 2000	4 × 100 m relay men	Marco Torrieri, Alessandro Cavallaro, Maurizio Checcucci, Andrea Colombo	3rd	38.88
(Germany) Bremen 2001	4 × 100 m relay men	Francesco Scuderi, Alessandro Cavallaro, Maurizio Checcucci, Andrea Colombo	1st	38.89
(France) Annecy 2002	4 × 100 m relay men	Francesco Scuderi, Alessandro Cavallaro, Marco Torrieri, Stefano Dacastello	2nd	38.89
(Italy) Florence 2003	4 × 100 m relay men	Francesco Scuderi, Simone Collio, Massimiliano Donati, Alessandro Cavallaro	1st	38.42
(Italy) Florence 2005	4 × 100 m relay men	Luca Verdecchia, Simone Collio, Marco Torrieri, Koura Kaba Fantoni	2nd	38.69
(Italy) Florence 2005	4 × 100 m relay women	Vincenza Calì, Manuela Grillo, Manuela Levorato, Elena Sordelli	3rd	43.83
(Spain) Malaga 2006	4 × 100 m relay men	Luca Verdecchia, Stefano Anceschi, Massimiliano Donati, Francesco Scuderi	2nd	39.14
(France) Annecy 2008	4 × 100 m relay men	Emanuele Di Gregorio, Simone Collio, Massimiliano Donati, Maurizio Checcucci	3rd	38.73
(France) Annecy 2008	4 × 100 m relay women	Anita Pistone, Vincenza Calì, Giulia Arcioni, Audrey Alloh	3rd	43.04
(Portugal) Leiria 2009	4 × 100 m relay men	Fabio Cerutti, Simone Collio, Emanuele Di Gregorio, Giovanni Tomasicchio	1st	38.77
(Norway) Bergen 2010	4 × 100 m relay men	Roberto Donati, Emanuele Di Gregorio, Simone Collio, Maurizio Checcucci	1st	38.83
(Germany) Braunschweig 2014	4 × 100 m relay men	Massimiliano Ferraro, Eseosa Desalu, Diego Marani, Delmas Obou	3rd	39.06
(Russia) Cheboksary 2015	4 × 100 m relay men	Massimiliano Ferraro, Enrico Demonte, Davide Manenti, Delmas Obou	3rd	38.71
(Poland) Chorzów 2023	4 × 100 m relay men	Lorenzo Patta, Samuele Ceccarelli, Marco Ricci, Filippo Tortu	2nd	38.47

=== 4 × 400 m relay ===
Edition	Event	Team	Position	Time
(Socialist Federal Republic of Yugoslavia) Zagreb 1981	4 × 400 m relay men	Stefano Malinverni, Alfonso Di Guida, Roberto Ribaud, Mauro Zuliani	1st	3.01.42
(West Germany) Frankfurt 1991	4 × 400 m relay men	Marco Vaccari, Fabio Grossi, Alessandro Aimar, Andrea Nuti	3rd	3:02.32
(France) Lille 1995	4 × 400 m relay men	Marco Vaccari, Fabrizio Mori, Alessandro Aimar, Andrea Nuti	2nd	3:04.27
(Germany) Munich 1997	4 × 400 m relay men	Marco Vaccari, Alessandro Aimar, Fabrizio Mori, Ashraf Saber	2nd	3:02.60
(Russia) St. Petersburg 1998	4 × 400 m relay men	Walter Pirovano, Marco Vaccari, Edoardo Vallet, Fabrizio Mori	2nd	3:03.45
(France) Annecy 2002	4 × 400 m relay women	Daniela Reina, Daniela Graglia, Manuela Levorato, Danielle Perpoli	3rd	3.29.14
(Spain) Malaga 2006	4 × 400 m relay men	Andrew Howe, Gianni Carabelli, Luca Galletti, Andrea Barberi	3rd	3:04.27
(Portugal) Leiria 2009	4 × 400 m relay women	Daniela Reina, Maria Enrica Spacca, Marta Milani, Libania Grenot	2nd	3.28.77
(Poland) Bydgoszcz 2019	4 × 400 m relay men	Edoardo Scotti, Matteo Galvan, Brayan Lopez, Davide Re	1st	3.02.04
(Poland) Bydgoszcz 2019	4 × 400 m relay women	Maria Benedicta Chigbolu, Ayomide Folorunso, Rebecca Borga, Giancarla Trevisan	3rd	3:27.32
(Poland) Chorzów 2021	4 × 400 m relay men	Davide Re, Alessandro Sibilio, Edoardo Scotti, Vladimir Aceti	1st	3.02.64
(Poland) Chorzów 2021	4 × 400 m relay women	Alice Mangione, Eleonora Marchiando, Petra Nardelli, Raphaela Lukudo	3rd	3:29.05

== Military World Games ==
The table shows only the times in which Italy has reached the podium.

=== 4 × 100 m relay ===
Edition	Event	Team	Position	Time
(Italy) Rome 1995	4 × 100 m relay men	Milko Campus, Angelo Cipolloni, Sandro Floris, Ezio Madonia	1st	40.20
(Croatia) Zagreb 1999	4 × 100 m relay men	Andrea Rabino, Massimiliano Donati, Maurizio Checcucci, Giovanni Puggioni	1st	39.92
(Italy) Catania 2003	4 × 100 m relay men	Stefano Bellotto, Maurizio Checcucci, Alessandro Vecchi, Gianluca Capati	1st	41.07
(India) Hyderabad 2007	4 × 100 m relay men	Alessandro Cavallaro, Simone Collio, Rosario La Mastra, Jacques Riparelli	1st	39.28
(India) Hyderabad 2007	4 × 100 m relay women	Anita Pistone, Maria Aurora Salvagno, Rita De Cesaris, Micol Cattaneo	1st	44.97

=== 4 × 400 m relay ===
Edition	Event	Team	Position	Time
(Italy) Rome 1995	4 × 400 m relay men	Ashraf Saber, Marco Chiavarini, Fabrizio Mori, Marco Vaccari	3rd	3:05.58

== Multiple medalists ==
Military World Games medals are excluded from the list, since the athletes are not representative of the Italy national athletics team but represent military sports bodies.

Still active

#	Athlete	Gold medal	Silver medal	Bronze medal	Notes
1	Simone Collio	5	2	1	
2	Pietro Mennea	4	3	5	
3	Sandro Floris	4	1	4	
4	Filippo Tortu	4	2	0	
5	Maurizio Checcucci	4	1	2	
6	Stefano Tilli	3	1	4	
7	Marcell Jacobs	3	1	0	

== See also ==
- Italian all-time lists - 4 × 100 metres relay
- Italian all-time lists - 4 × 400 metres relay
- Italy national athletics team
- Italy at the World Athletics Relays
- Italian records in athletics
- Naturalized athletes of Italy
- Italian team at the running events
- Athletics in Italy (the national all-time lists)
