= 1994 European Athletics Indoor Championships – Men's 400 metres =

The men's 400 metres event at the 1994 European Athletics Indoor Championships was held in Palais Omnisports de Paris-Bercy on 11, 12 and 13 March.

== Medalists ==
Gold	Silver	Bronze
Du'aine Thorne-Ladejo; Great Britain	Mikhail Vdovin; Russia	Rico Lieder; Germany

== Results ==
=== Heats ===
First 3 from each heat (Q) and the next 3 fastest (q) qualified for the semifinals.

Rank	Heat	Name	Nationality	Time	Notes
1	1	Rico Lieder	Germany	47.08	Q
2	1	Jamie Baulch	Great Britain	47.15	Q
3	3	Fabio Grossi	Italy	47.17	Q
4	2	Lutz Becker	Germany	47.25	Q
5	3	Mark Richardson	Great Britain	47.31	Q
6	2	Pierre-Marie Hilaire	France	47.33	Q
7	2	Du'aine Thorne-Ladejo	Great Britain	47.33	Q
8	2	Alessandro Aimar	Italy	47.43	q
9	1	Andrea Nuti	Italy	47.50	Q
10	1	Mikhail Vdovin	Russia	47.56	q
11	3	Rikard Rasmusson	Sweden	47.68	Q
12	3	Evripides Demosthenous	Cyprus	47.83	q
13	3	Rodolphe Rosilette	France	48.45	

=== Semifinals ===
First 3 from each semifinal qualified directly (Q) for the final.

Rank	Heat	Name	Nationality	Time	Notes
1	1	Du'aine Thorne-Ladejo	Great Britain	46.26	Q
2	1	Mikhail Vdovin	Russia	46.61	Q
3	1	Lutz Becker	Germany	46.71	Q
4	1	Mark Richardson	Great Britain	46.77	
5	2	Rico Lieder	Germany	46.78	Q
6	2	Jamie Baulch	Great Britain	46.91	Q
7	2	Andrea Nuti	Italy	47.18	Q
8	2	Pierre-Marie Hilaire	France	47.28	
9	1	Alessandro Aimar	Italy	47.38	
10	2	Rikard Rasmusson	Sweden	47.60	
11	2	Evripides Demosthenous	Cyprus	47.91	
12	1	Fabio Grossi	Italy	48.14	

=== Final ===
Rank	Name	Nationality	Time	Notes
1st place, gold medalist(s)	Du'aine Thorne-Ladejo	Great Britain	46.53	
2nd place, silver medalist(s)	Mikhail Vdovin	Russia	46.56	
3rd place, bronze medalist(s)	Rico Lieder	Germany	46.82	
4	Lutz Becker	Germany	47.74	
5	Andrea Nuti	Italy	50.05	
	Jamie Baulch	Great Britain	DNF	
