= Marco Chiavarini =

Italian middle-distance runner

Personal information
- National team: Italy: 8 caps (1992–2000)
- Born: 25 May 1972 (age 54) Moncalieri, Italy

Sport
- Sport: Athletics
- Event: 800 metres
- Club: Carabinieri Bologna
- Retired: 2005

Achievements and titles
- Personal bests: 800 m: 1:45.05 (1995); 800 m (i): 1:46.76 (1995)
Medal record
Military World Games
Bronze medal – third place	1995 Rome	4×400 m relay

Marco Chiavarini (born 25 May 1972) is a former Italian middle-distance runner who was 6th at the 2000 European Indoor Championships in 800 metres.

Italian 800 meters indoor champion 1995

== Career ==
At the end of 2020 outdoor season his personal best 1:45.05 in 800 m, ran in 1995, is still the 8th Italian best performance of all-time. This personal best in 1995 was also the 25th world best performance.

== Achievements ==
Year	Competition	Venue	Rank	Event	Time	Notes
2000	European Indoor Championships	(Belgium) Ghent	6th	800 m	1:51.27	

== National titles ==
Chiavarini won a national championship at individual senior level.

- Italian Athletics Indoor Championships
  - 800 m: 1995

== See also ==
- Italian all-time top lists – 800 metres
- Italian national track relay team
- Italy at the Military World Games
