= Mikhail Vdovin =

Russian sprinter

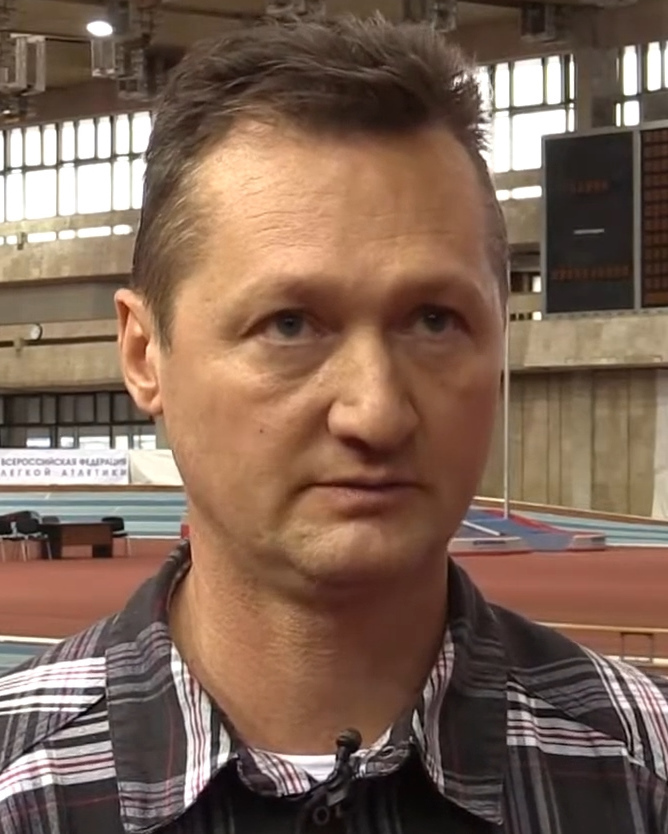
- Mikhail Vdovin in 2014

Medal record

Men's athletics

Representing Russia

European Championships
Bronze medal – third place	1994 Helsinki	4×400 m

Mikhail Vdovin (born 15 January 1967) is a retired Russian 400 metres runner.

== Achievements ==
Year	Competition	Venue	Position	Event	Notes
Representing the Soviet Union
1986	World Junior Championships	Athens, Greece	43rd (h)	200 m	22.19 (+0.3 m/s)
1990	Goodwill Games	Seattle, United States	8th	200 m	21.63
Representing Russia
1994	European Indoor Championships	Paris, France	2nd	400 m	46.56
1994	European Championships	Helsinki, Finland	6th	400 m	46.23
1994	European Championships	Helsinki, Finland	3rd	4 × 400 m relay	3:03.10
1995	World Indoor Championships	Barcelona, Spain	3rd	400 m	46.65
