= Italy at the IAAF World Cup =

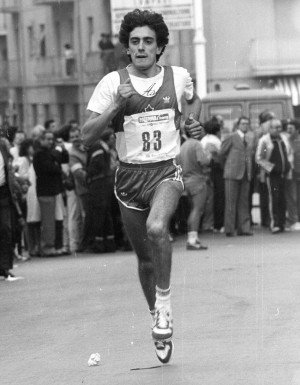
Salvatore Antibo, the only gold medal winner for Italy at the Athletics World Cup.

Italy at the Athletics World Cup (from 2010 known as IAAF Continental Cup) participated at the 1981 IAAF World Cup, because it was the host nation and on the other occasions participated as part of the Europe team.

== Participation as nation ==
Competition	Edition	1st edition	Men				Women				Total			
Competition	Edition	1st edition	1st place, gold medalist(s)	2nd place, silver medalist(s)	3rd place, bronze medalist(s)	Tot.	1st place, gold medalist(s)	2nd place, silver medalist(s)	3rd place, bronze medalist(s)	Tot.	1st place, gold medalist(s)	2nd place, silver medalist(s)	3rd place, bronze medalist(s)	Tot.
World Cup	1	1977	1	5	6	12	0	4	1	5	1	9	7	17

== Medals ==
The Italian athletes competed in Europe team (with the exception of 1981 IAAF World Cup in which they participated as a nation).

Edition	Event	1st place, gold medalist(s)	2nd place, silver medalist(s)	3rd place, bronze medalist(s)
(West Germany) 1977 Düsseldorf	100 metres		Pietro Mennea	
(West Germany) 1977 Düsseldorf	High jump		Sara Simeoni	
(Canada) 1979 Montreal	400 metres		Mauro Zuliani	
(Canada) 1979 Montreal	High jump		Sara Simeoni	
(Canada) 1979 Montreal	3000 metres steeplechase			Mariano Scartezzini
(Italy) 1981 Rome
(Italy) 1981 Rome	3000 metres steeplechase		Mariano Scartezzini	
(Italy) 1981 Rome	1500 metres		Gabriella Dorio	
(Italy) 1981 Rome	Hammer throw			Giampaolo Urlando
(Italy) 1981 Rome	5000 metres			Vittorio Fontanella
(Italy) 1981 Rome	3000 metres			Silvana Cruciata
(Australia) 1985 Canberra	5000 metres		Stefano Mei	
(Australia) 1985 Canberra	Shot put			Alessandro Andrei
(Spain) 1989 Barcelona	10,000 metres	Salvatore Antibo		
(Spain) 1989 Barcelona	3000 metres steeplechase		Alessandro Lambruschini	
(Cuba) 1992 Havana	800 metres			Andrea Benvenuti
(United Kingdom) 1994 London	3000 metres steeplechase			Alessandro Lambruschini
(Croatia) 2010 Split	4×400 metres relay		Libania Grenot	
Total		1	9	7

== See also ==
- Italy national athletics team
- Italy at the Athletics European Cup
