= 1997 European Cup (athletics) =

- Dates: 21–22 June (Super Leagues); 7–8 June (First Leagues); 28–29 June (Second Leagues)
- Host city: Munich, Germany
- Venue: Olympic Stadium
- Level: Senior
- Type: Outdoor
- Events: 39

The 1997 European Cup was the 18th edition of the European Cup of athletics.

Beginning with this edition athletes in throws and horizontal jumps were limited to only four attempts instead of the usual six. It was also the first edition to feature women's pole vault and hammer throw.

The Super League Finals were held at the Olympic Stadium in Munich, Germany.

== Super League ==
Held on 21 and 22 June in Munich, Germany.

=== Team standings ===
Men
Pos.	Nation	Points
1	Great Britain	118
2	Germany	105
3	Russia	104
4	Italy	96
5	Spain	78
6	France	75
7	Norway	72.5
8	Greece	71.5

Women
Pos.	Nation	Points
1	Russia	127
2	Germany	113
3	Great Britain	86
4	Italy	77
5	France	77
6	Ukraine	76
7	Romania	72
8	Belarus	55

=== Results summary ===
==== Men's events ====
Event	Gold		Silver		Bronze	
100 m (Wind: +0.2 m/s)	Linford Christie; Great Britain	10.04 =CR	Geir Moen; Norway	10.18	Andrey Fedoriv; Russia	10.19
200 m (Wind: +0.7 m/s)	Linford Christie; Great Britain Georgios Panayotopoulos; Greece	20.56	Not awarded		Geir Moen; Norway	20.60
400 m	Roger Black; Great Britain	45.63	David Canal; Spain	46.28	Marco Vaccari; Italy	46.40
800 m	Vebjørn Rodal; Norway	1:47.54	Nico Motchebon; Germany	1:47.89	Mark Sesay; Great Britain	1:48.11
1500 m	Fermín Cacho; Spain	3:37.79	Gennaro Di Napoli; Italy	3:37.81	Vyacheslav Shabunin; Russia	3:38.14
3000 m	Dieter Baumann; Germany	7:41.08; CR	Manuel Pancorbo; Spain	7:41.60	Panagiotis Papoulias; Greece	7:45.65
5000 m	Gennaro Di Napoli; Italy	13:38.33	Anacleto Jiménez; Spain	13:39.42	Panagiotis Papoulias; Greece	13:40.02
3000 m steeplechase	Rob Hough; Great Britain	8:35.03	Alessandro Lambruschini; Italy	8:36.15	Vladimir Pronin; Russia	8:36.94
110 m hurdles (Wind: +0.2 m/s)	Florian Schwarthoff; Germany	13.20	Colin Jackson; Great Britain	13.28	Andrey Kislykh; Russia	13.53
400 m hurdles	Fabrizio Mori; Italy	48.93	Stéphane Diagana; France	49.15	Ruslan Mashchenko; Russia	49.74
4 × 100 m	Italy; Nicola Asuni; Giovanni Puggioni; Angelo Cipolloni; Sandro Floris	38.80	Norway; Fernando Ramirez; John Ertzgaard; Per Ivar Sivle; Geir Moen	38.96; NR	Great Britain; Jason Gardener; Marlon Devonish; Doug Walker; Ian Mackie	38.97
4 × 400 m	Great Britain; Roger Black; Jamie Baulch; Iwan Thomas; Mark Richardson	2:59.46; CR	Italy; Marco Vaccari; Alessandro Aimar; Fabrizio Mori; Ashraf Saber	3:02.60	Russia; Innokentiy Zharov; Dmitriy Kosov; Dmitriy Golovastov; Dmitriy Bey	3:03.09
High jump	Arturo Ortiz; Spain	2.30	Sergey Klyugin; Russia	2.30	Martin Buss; Germany	2.30
Pole vault (indoor)	Maksim Tarasov; Russia	5.95	Jean Galfione; France	5.75	Tim Lobinger; Germany	5.70
Long jump	Kirill Sosunov; Russia	8.00	Kostas Koukodimos; Greece	7.88	Emmanuel Bangué; France	7.86
Triple jump	Jonathan Edwards; Great Britain	17.74	Denis Kapustin; Russia	17.24	Charles Friedek; Germany	16.71
Shot put	Oliver-Sven Buder; Germany	20.41	Corrado Fantini; Italy	19.72	Manuel Martínez; Spain	19.29
Discus throw	Lars Riedel; Germany	63.36	Robert Weir; Great Britain	61.62	Sergey Lyakhov; Russia	59.72
Hammer throw	Heinz Weis; Germany	81.42	Vadim Khersontsev; Russia	78.48	Alexandros Papadimitriou; Greece	74.12
Javelin throw	Steve Backley; Great Britain	86.86	Kostas Gatsioudis; Greece	86.10	Boris Henry; Germany	85.42
WR world record | AR area record | CR championship record | GR games record | NR national record | OR Olympic record | PB personal best | SB season best | WL world leading (in a given season)

==== Women's events ====
Event	Gold		Silver		Bronze	
100 m (Wind: +0.8 m/s)	Natalya Voronova; Russia	11.18	Andrea Philipp; Germany	11.23	Natalya Safronnikova; Belarus	11.41
200 m (Wind: -0.2 m/s)	Christine Arron; France	22.89	Andrea Philipp; Germany	22.98	Marina Trandenkova; Russia	23.16
400 m	Grit Breuer; Germany	50.38	Donna Fraser; Great Britain	51.51	Olga Kotlyarova; Russia	51.53
800 m	Yelena Afanasyeva; Russia	1:59.93	Irina Lishchinskaya; Ukraine	2:00.71	Linda Kisabaka; Germany	2:01.07
1500 m	Kelly Holmes; Great Britain	4:04.79	Gabriela Szabo; Romania	4:06.25	Irina Biryukova; Russia	4:07.98
3000 m	Roberta Brunet; Italy	8:51.66	Kristina da Fonseca-Wollheim; Germany	8:52.20	Paula Radcliffe; Great Britain	8:52.79
5000 m	Gabriela Szabo; Romania	15:02.68; CR	Roberta Brunet; Italy	15:02.87	Luminita Zaituc; Germany	15:52.95
100 m hurdles (Wind: +0.7 m/s)	Svetlana Laukhova; Russia	12.94	Patricia Girard; France	13.03	Angie Thorp; Great Britain	13.16
400 m hurdles	Sally Gunnell; Great Britain	54.57	Silvia Rieger; Germany	55.23	Yekaterina Bakhvalova; Russia	55.66
4 × 100 m	Russia; Yekaterina Leshchova; Galina Malchugina; Natalya Voronova; Marina Trandenkova	43.05	France; Frédérique Bangué; Christine Arron; Patricia Girard; Sylviane Félix	43.21	Germany; Shanta Ghosh; Gabi Rockmeier; Birgit Rockmeier; Andrea Philipp	43.25
4 × 400 m	Russia; Yekaterina Bakhvalova; Yekaterina Kulikova; Natalya Khrushcheleva; Olga Kotlyarova	3:24.10	Germany; Anke Feller; Uta Rohländer; Silvia Rieger; Anja Rücker	3:26.12	Great Britain; Allison Curbishley; Donna Fraser; Michelle Thomas; Sally Gunnell	3:26.48
High jump	Heike Balck; Germany	1.94	Tatyana Motkova; Russia	1.92	Antonella Bevilacqua; Italy	1.88
Pole vault	Anzhela Balakhonova; Ukraine	4.25	Andrea Müller; Germany	4.20	Janine Whitlock; Great Britain	4.10
Long jump	Fiona May; Italy	6.61	Nina Perevedentseva; Russia	6.60	Susen Tiedtke-Greene; Germany	6.57
Triple jump	Inna Lasovskaya; Russia	14.91	Rodica Mateescu; Romania	14.53	Ashia Hansen; Great Britain	14.52
Shot put	Astrid Kumbernuss; Germany	20.64	Irina Korzhanenko; Russia	18.18	Mara Rosolen; Italy	17.28
Discus throw	Natalya Sadova; Russia	67.72	Franka Dietzsch; Germany	61.72	Yelena Antonova; Ukraine	60.16
Hammer throw	Olga Kuzenkova; Russia	73.10	Mihaela Melinte; Romania	69.76	Lyudmila Gubkina; Belarus	68.24
Javelin throw	Oksana Ovchinnikova; Russia	67.16	Felicia Tilea; Romania	64.98	Tanja Damaske; Germany	64.72
WR world record | AR area record | CR championship record | GR games record | NR national record | OR Olympic record | PB personal best | SB season best | WL world leading (in a given season)

== First League ==
The First League was held on 7 and 8 June

=== Men ===
Group A
Held in Prague, Czech Republic

Pos.	Nation	Points
1	Czech Republic	117
2	Poland	114
3	Hungary	98
4	Romania	92
5	Ukraine	83
6	Latvia	80.5
7	Yugoslavia	68.5
8	Bulgaria	64

Group B
Held in Dublin, Ireland

Pos.	Nation	Points
1	Finland	102
2	Sweden	100
3	Belgium	99.5
4	Switzerland	90
5	Netherlands	88
6	Portugal	85.5
7	Ireland	85
8	Austria	68

=== Women ===
Group A
Held in Prague, Czech Republic

Pos.	Nation	Points
1	Czech Republic	113
2	Poland	113
3	Greece	95
4	Spain	90.5
5	Hungary	87
6	Bulgaria	77
7	Yugoslavia	57
8	Lithuania	51.5

Group B
Held in Dublin, Ireland

Pos.	Nation	Points
1	Slovenia	103.5
2	Finland	103
3	Switzerland	97.5
4	Portugal	96
5	Sweden	82.5
6	Norway	74
7	Austria	60.5
8	Belgium	60

== Second League ==
The Second League was held on 28 and 29 June

=== Men ===
Group A
Held in Odense, Denmark

Pos.	Nation	Points
1	Slovenia	125
2	Denmark	115
3	Israel	115
4	Cyprus	107
5	Lithuania	84
6	AASSE	71
7	Iceland	62
8	Armenia	30

Group B
Held in Riga, Latvia

Pos.	Nation	Points
1	Belarus	86
2	Slovakia	71
3	Estonia	54
4	Turkey	53
5	Moldova	26

=== Women ===
Group A
Held in Odense, Denmark

Pos.	Nation	Points
1	Netherlands	100
2	Denmark	93
3	Iceland	62
4	Israel	57
5	Cyprus	53
6	AASSE	30

Group B
Held in Riga, Latvia

Pos.	Nation	Points
1	Latvia	74
2	Slovakia	59
3	Turkey	57
4	Estonia	56
5	Moldova	23
