= Giovanni Bongiorni =

Italian sprinter

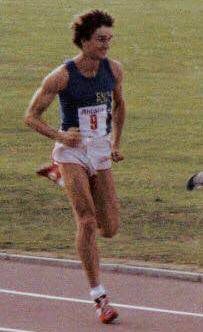

Personal information
- National team: Italy
- Born: 8 July 1956 (age 69) Pisa, Italy
- Height: 1.78 m (5 ft 10 in)
- Weight: 63 kg (139 lb)

Sport
- Sport: Athletics
- Event: Sprint

Achievements and titles
- Personal bests: 100 m: 10.3 (1983); 200 m: 20.82 (1981)
Medal record
Event	1st	2nd	3rd
European Indoor Championships	0	0	1
European Cup	1	0	1
Total	1	0	2

Giovanni Bongiorni (born 8 July 1956) is a former Italian sprinter who specialized in the 200 metres.

== Biography ==
His personal best 200 metres time was 20.82 seconds, achieved in July 1981 in Turin. His personal best 100 metres time was 10.60 seconds, achieved in July 1982 in Rome. His daughter Anna Bongiorni is a sprinter of the Italy national athletics team.

== Achievements ==
Year	Competition	Venue	Position	Event
1982	European Championships	Athens, Greece	4th	4 × 100 m relay
1984	European Indoor Championships	Gothenburg, Sweden	3rd	200 m
1984	Olympic Games	Los Angeles, United States	4th	4 × 100 m relay

== National titles ==
Bongiorni won two national championships at individual senior level.

- Italian Athletics Championships
  - 200 m: 1981
- Italian Athletics Indoor Championships
  - 200 m: 1986

== See also ==
- Italy national relay team
