= 1991 European Cup (athletics) =

- Dates: 29–30 June ("A" Finals); 22–23 June ("B" & "C" Finals)
- Host city: Frankfurt, Germany
- Level: Senior
- Type: Outdoor
- Events: 36

The 1991 European Cup was the 13th edition of the European Cup of athletics.

The "A" Finals were held in Frankfurt, Germany. The first two teams qualified for the 1992 IAAF World Cup.

== "A" Final ==
Held on 29 and 30 June in Frankfurt, Germany

=== Team standings ===
Men
Pos.	Nation	Points
1	Soviet Union	114
2	Great Britain	111.5
3	Germany	108
4	Italy	107
5	France	98.5
6	Czechoslovakia	66.5
7	Hungary	63
8	Bulgaria	49.5

Women
Pos.	Nation	Points
1	Germany	110
2	Soviet Union	105
3	Great Britain	82
4	Romania	71
5	France	62
6	Poland	55
7	Bulgaria	46
8	Hungary	44

=== Results summary ===
==== Men's events ====
Event	Gold		Silver		Bronze	
100 m (Wind: +0.5 m/s)	Linford Christie; Great Britain	10.18	Daniel Sangouma; France	10.20	Steffen Bringmann; Germany	10.42
200 m (Wind: -1.6 m/s)	Jean-Charles Trouabal; France	20.60	John Regis; Great Britain	20.73	Stefano Tilli; Italy	20.79
400 m	Roger Black; Great Britain	44.91; CR	Olivier Noirot; France	45.18	Tamás Molnár; Hungary	45.78
800 m	Tom McKean; Great Britain	1:45.60	Andrey Sudnik; Soviet Union	1:46.35	Frédéric Cornette; France	1:46.63
1500 m	Peter Elliott; Great Britain	3:43.39	Jens-Peter Herold; France	3:43.47	Gennaro Di Napoli; Italy	3:44.75
5000 m	Salvatore Antibo; Italy	13:21.68; CR	Gary Staines; Great Britain	13:35.08	Pascal Thiébaut; France	13:45.61
10,000 m	Eamonn Martin; Great Britain	28:00.53	Francesco Panetta; Italy	28:03.10	Stéphane Franke; Germany	28:04.41
3000 m steeplechase	Alessandro Lambruschini; Italy	8:29.62	Ivan Konovalov; Soviet Union	8:30.37	Béla Vágó; Hungary	8:30.60
110 m hurdles (Wind: -0.9 m/s)	Colin Jackson; Great Britain	13.31; CR	Florian Schwarthoff; Germany	13.43	Philippe Tourret; France	13.63
400 m hurdles	Kriss Akabusi; Great Britain	48.39	Stéphane Caristan; France	49.43	Fabrizio Mori; Italy	49.76
4 × 100 m	France; Gilles Quénéhervé; Daniel Sangouma; Jean-Charles Trouabal; Bruno Marie-Rose	38.67	Soviet Union; Yuriy Yazynin; Andrey Fedoriv; Aleksandr Goremykin; Vitaliy Savin	38.87	Italy; Giorgio Marras; Carlo Simionato; Ezio Madonia; Stefano Tilli	38.89
4 × 400 m	Great Britain; Paul Sanders; Kriss Akabusi; Brian Whittle; Roger Black	3:00.58	Soviet Union; Dmitriy Golovastov; Dmitriy Kliger; Aleksey Podshibyakin; Vjaceslavs Kocherjagins	3:01.80	Italy; Marco Vaccari; Fabio Grossi; Alessandro Aimar; Andrea Nuti	3:02.32
High jump	Dalton Grant; Great Britain	2.30	Igor Paklin; Soviet Union	2.28	Joël Vincent; France	2.22
Pole vault	Grigoriy Yegorov; Soviet Union	5.60	Gianni Iapichino; Italy	5.50	István Bagyula; Hungary	5.50
Long jump	Dietmar Haaf; Germany	8.30w	Robert Emmiyan; Soviet Union	8.01	Giovanni Evangelisti; Italy	7.76
Triple jump	Ralf Jaros; Germany	17.66; CR	Jan Cado; Czechoslovakia	16.94	Georges Sainte-Rose; France	16.93
Shot put	Ulf Timmermann; Germany	20.26	Sergey Smirnov; Soviet Union	19.91	Alessandro Andrei; Italy	19.16
Discus throw	Attila Horváth; Hungary	65.24	Jürgen Schult; Germany	63.24	Gejza Valent; Czechoslovakia	62.14
Hammer throw	Igor Astapkovich; Soviet Union	81.60	Tibor Gécsek; Hungary	76.90	Enrico Sgrulletti; Italy	76.16
Javelin throw	Jan Železný; Czechoslovakia	82.84	Viktor Zaytsev; Soviet Union	82.68	Peter Blank; Germany	82.42
WR world record | AR area record | CR championship record | GR games record | NR national record | OR Olympic record | PB personal best | SB season best | WL world leading (in a given season)

==== Women's events ====
Event	Gold		Silver		Bronze	
100 m (Wind: -2.7 m/s)	Irina Privalova; Soviet Union	11.29	Katrin Krabbe; Germany	11.45	Anelia Nuneva; Bulgaria	11.74
200 m (Wind: -3.4 m/s)	Irina Privalova; Soviet Union	22.48	Andrea Thomas; Germany	23.08	Maguy Nestoret; France	23.22
400 m	Marie-José Pérec; France	49.32; CR	Grit Breuer; Germany	49.87	Olga Nazarova; Soviet Union	51.17
800 m	Ella Kovacs; Romania	1:59.01	Christine Wachtel; Germany	1:59.61	Svetlana Masterkova; Soviet Union	1:59.69
1500 m	Doina Melinte; Romania	4:00.83; CR	Natalya Artyomova; Soviet Union	4:01.01	Ellen Kiessling; Germany	4:05.13
3000 m	Margareta Keszeg; Romania	8:44.47	Uta Pippig; Germany	8:45.40	Lyubov Kremlyova; Soviet Union	8:49.72
10,000 m	Kathrin Ullrich; Germany	31:03.62; CR	Jill Hunter; Great Britain	31:07.88	Iulia Negura; Romania	32:10.37
100 m hurdles (Wind: -2.1 m/s)	Lyudmila Narozhilenko; Soviet Union	12.55	Monique Ewanjé-Épée; France	12.79	Kristin Patzwahl; Germany	13.10
400 m hurdles	Margarita Ponomaryova; Soviet Union	54.42	Sally Gunnell; Great Britain	54.61	Heike Meissner; Germany	55.64
4 × 100 m	Soviet Union; Nadezhda Rashchupkina; Galina Malchugina; Marina Zhirova; Irina Privalova	42.51	Germany; Andrea Philipp; Katrin Krabbe; Sabine Richter; Heike Drechsler	42.57	France; Magalie Simioneck; Maguy Nestoret; Valérie Jean-Charles; Odiah Sidibé	43.60
4 × 400 m	Soviet Union; Yelena Ruzina; Lyudmila Dzhigalova; Margarita Ponomaryova; Olga Nazarova	3:21.77	Germany; Katrin Schreiter; Sabine Busch; Uta Rohlaender; Grit Breuer	3:24.20	Great Britain; Sally Gunnell; Lorraine Hanson; Jennifer Stoute; Linda Keough	3:24.25
High jump	Svetlana Leseva; Bulgaria	1.96	Judit Kovács; Hungary	1.92	Heike Henkel; Germany	1.90
Long jump	Heike Drechsler; Germany	7.20w	Larisa Berezhnaya; Soviet Union	7.06	Fiona May; Great Britain	6.77
Shot put	Natalya Lisovskaya; Soviet Union	21.12	Astrid Kumbernuss; Germany	19.11	Judy Oakes; Great Britain	18.74
Discus throw	Ilke Wyludda; Germany	65.66	Larisa Mikhalchenko; Soviet Union	65.06	Stefenia Simova; Bulgaria	60.68
Javelin throw	Tessa Sanderson; Great Britain	65.18	Irina Kostyuchenkova; Soviet Union	64.56	Petra Meier; Germany	63.18
WR world record | AR area record | CR championship record | GR games record | NR national record | OR Olympic record | PB personal best | SB season best | WL world leading (in a given season)

== "B" Final ==
Both "B" finals held on 22 and 23 June in Barcelona, Spain

Men
Pos.	Nation	Points
1	Spain	118
2	Poland	116
3	Sweden	103
4	Yugoslavia	90
5	Switzerland	82
6	Finland	81
7	Austria	65
8	Greece	55

Women
Pos.	Nation	Points
1	Italy	93
2	Finland	89
3	Czechoslovakia	79
4	Spain	73
5	Belgium	66
6	Switzerland	58
7	Sweden	58
8	Netherlands	57

== "C" Finals ==
All "C" finals held on 22 and 23 June

=== Men ===
"C1" Final
Held in Viseu, Portugal

Pos.	Nation	Points
1	Norway	92
2	Portugal	89
3	Netherlands	75.5
4	Denmark	62
5	Ireland	58.5
6	Iceland	41

"C2" Final
Held in Athens, Greece

Pos.	Nation	Points
1	Romania	81
2	Belgium	72
3	Turkey	52
4	Cyprus	47
5	Israel	45

=== Women ===
"C1" Final
Held in Viseu, Portugal

Pos.	Nation	Points
1	Norway	76
2	Portugal	66
3	Austria	61
4	Denmark	50
5	Ireland	48
6	Iceland	34

"C2" Final
Held in Athens, Greece

Pos.	Nation	Points
1	Yugoslavia	69
2	Greece	67
3	Israel	40
4	Turkey	38
5	Cyprus	26
