= Paolo Catalano =

Italian sprinter

Personal information
- National team: Italy
- Born: 27 February 1964 (age 62) Tripoli, Libya

Sport
- Sport: Athletics
- Event: Sprint

Achievements and titles
- Personal bests: 100 m: 10.61 (1990); 200 m: 20.99 (1989); 200 m (i): 21.32 (1991)
Medal record
Mediterranean Games
Gold medal – first place	1987 Latakia	4x100 metres relay
European Cup
Bronze medal – third place	1987 Prague	4x100 metres relay

Paolo Catalano (born 27 February 1964 in Tripoli) is a retired Italian sprinter who specialized in the 200 metres, that won two medals with the national relay team at the International athletics competitions.

== Biography ==
He finished seventh in 4 × 100 m relay at the 1987 World Championships, with teammates Ezio Madonia, Domenico Gorla and Pierfrancesco Pavoni. He also competed at the World Indoor Championships in 1989 and 1991 without reaching the final.

His personal best 200 metres time was 20.99 seconds, achieved in February 1989 in Turin. His personal best 100 metres time was 10.61 seconds, achieved in August 1990 in Sestriere.

== Achievements ==
Year	Competition	Venue	Position	Event	Performance	Notes
1987	World Championships	(Italy) Rome	7th	4 × 100 m relay	39.62	

== See also ==
- Italy national relay team
