= 1995 European Cup (athletics) =

- Dates: 24–25 June (Super Leagues); 10–11 June (First & Second Leagues)
- Host city: Villeneuve d'Ascq, France
- Level: Senior
- Type: Outdoor
- Events: 37

The 1995 European Cup was the 16th edition of the European Cup of athletics.

It was the last edition to feature the 10,000 metres event and the first to feature women's 5000 metres. The Super League Finals were held in Villeneuve d'Ascq, France.

== Super League ==
Held on 24 and 25 June in Villeneuve d'Ascq

=== Team standings ===
Men
Pos.	Nation	Points
1	Germany	117
2	Great Britain	107
3	Russia	105
4	Italy	96.5
5	Ukraine	82
6	Sweden	78.5
7	Spain	67
8	Poland	66

Women
Pos.	Nation	Points
1	Russia	117
2	Germany	100
3	Great Britain	85
4	France	75
5	Ukraine	75
6	Belarus	71
7	Italy	52
8	Poland	37

Spain was not relegated from the men's Super League as the host of the next edition.

=== Results summary ===
==== Men's events ====
Event	Gold		Silver		Bronze	
100 m (Wind: +2.0 m/s)	Linford Christie; Great Britain	10.05; CR	Andrey Grigoryev; Russia	10.27	Matias Ghansah; Sweden; Ezio Madonia; Italy	10.32
200 m (Wind: +1.9 m/s)	Linford Christie; Great Britain	20.11; CR	Vladislav Dologodin; Ukraine	20.35	Aleksandr Sokolov; Russia	20.64
400 m	Mark Richardson; Great Britain	45.43	Andrea Nuti; Italy	46.40	Karsten Just; Germany	46.42
800 m	Nico Motchebon; Germany	1:46.75	Andrzej Jakubiec; Poland	1:47.15	Andrea Giocondi; Italy	1:47.33
1500 m	Rüdiger Stenzel; Germany	3:42.58	Vyacheslav Shabunin; Russia	3:42.59	Fermín Cacho; Spain	3:44.20
5000 m	Gennaro Di Napoli; Italy	13:45.57	John Nuttall; Great Britain	13:46.82	Manuel Pancorbo; Spain	13:48.93
10000 m	Stefano Baldini; Italy	28:45.77	Stephan Freigang; Germany	28:46.34	Alejandro Gómez; Spain	28:46.76
3000 m steeplechase	Alessandro Lambruschini; Italy	8:21.94	Steffen Brand; Germany	8:24.00	Javier Rodríguez; Spain	8:25.03
110 m hurdles (Wind: +1.0 m/s)	Florian Schwarthoff; Germany	13.28	Andy Tulloch; Great Britain	13.64	Dmitriy Kolesnichenko; Ukraine	13.67
400 m hurdles	Laurent Ottoz; Italy	49.30	Ruslan Mashchenko; Russia	49.49	Sven Nylander; Sweden	49.64
4 × 100 m	Great Britain; Jason Gardener; Tony Jarrett; Darren Braithwaite; Linford Christie	38.73	Germany; Christian Konieczny; Robert Kurnicki; Michael Huke; Marc Blume	39.12	Italy; Angelo Cipolloni; Alessandro Orlandi; Ezio Madonia; Andrea Colombo	39.19
4 × 400 m	Great Britain; Iwan Thomas; Adrian Patrick; Mark Richardson; Roger Black	3:00.34	Italy; Marco Vaccari; Fabrizio Mori; Alessandro Aimar; Andrea Nuti	3:04.27	Germany; Kai Karsten; Daniel Bittner; Markus Rau; Uwe Jahn	3:04.28
High jump	Steve Smith; Great Britain	2.31	Patrik Sjöberg; Sweden	2.31	Artur Partyka; Poland	2.25
Pole vault	Igor Trandenkov; Russia	5.80	Patrik Stenlund; Sweden	5.60	Javier García; Spain	5.50
Long jump	Stanislav Tarasenko; Russia	8.32w	Konstantin Krause; Germany	8.11	Vitaliy Kirilenko; Ukraine	8.11w
Triple jump	Jonathan Edwards; Great Britain	18.43w	Jacek Butkiewicz; Poland	17.14w	Arne Holm; Sweden	16.70w
Shot put	Aleksandr Bagach; Ukraine	20.65	Oliver-Sven Buder; Germany	20.28	Paolo Dal Soglio; Italy	19.80
Discus throw	Lars Riedel; Germany	68.76; CR	Sergey Lyakhov; Russia	63.82	Robert Weir; Great Britain	62.94
Hammer throw	Ilya Konovalov; Russia	79.66	Vadim Kolesnikov; Ukraine	77.00	Karsten Kobs; Germany	76.32
Javelin throw	Raymond Hecht; Germany	87.24	Andrey Moruyev; Russia	82.80	Steve Backley; Great Britain	81.96
WR world record | AR area record | CR championship record | GR games record | NR national record | OR Olympic record | PB personal best | SB season best | WL world leading (in a given season)

==== Women's events ====
Event	Gold		Silver		Bronze	
100 m (Wind: +2.0 m/s)	Melanie Paschke; Germany	11.08	Yekaterina Leshchova; Russia	11.16	Delphine Combe; France	11.30
200 m (Wind: +0.8 m/s)	Silke Knoll; Germany	22.45	Marina Trandenkova; Russia	22.67	Viktoriya Fomenko; Ukraine	22.75
400 m	Melanie Neef; Great Britain	51.35	Yuliya Sotnikova; Russia	51.81	Yelena Rurak; Ukraine	52.92
800 m	Yelena Afanasyeva; Russia	1:59.26	Patricia Djaté; France	1:59.73	Natalya Dukhnova; Belarus	2:00.07
1500 m	Kelly Holmes; Great Britain	4:07.02	Yekaterina Podkopayeva; Russia	4:07.88	Svetlana Miroshnik; Ukraine	4:07.94
5000 m	Viktoriya Nenasheva; Russia	15:16.06	Alison Wyeth; Great Britain	15:19.44	Tamara Koba; Ukraine	15:20.97
10000 m	Maria Guida; Italy	32:01.75	Uta Pippig; Germany	32:14.66	Alla Zhilyayeva; Russia	32:17.62
100 m hurdles (Wind: +1.5 m/s)	Yuliya Graudyn; Russia	12.86	Yelena Ovcharova; Ukraine	12.88	Jacqui Agyepong; Great Britain	12.90
400 m hurdles	Marie-José Pérec; France	54.51	Tatyana Kurochkina; Belarus	55.59	Tatyana Tereshchuk; Ukraine	56.05
4 × 100 m	Russia; Natalya Voronova; Galina Malchugina; Marina Trandenkova; Yekaterina Leshchova	42.74	Germany; Melanie Paschke; Birgit Rockmeier; Silke-Beate Knoll; Silke Lichtenhagen	43.15	France; Patricia Girard; Odiah Sidibé; Delphine Combe; Maguy Nestoret	43.63
4 × 400 m	Russia; Yelena Andreyeva; Tatyana Chebykina; Yuliya Sotnikova; Olga Nazarova	3:24.69	Germany; Karin Janke; Jana Schönenberger; Sandra Kuschmann; Uta Rohländer	3:26.23	Ukraine; Viktoriya Fomenko; Yana Manuylova; Olha Moroz; Yelena Rurak	3:27.33
High jump	Alina Astafei; Germany	1.98	Stefka Kostadinova; Bulgaria	1.94	Yelena Topchina; Russia	1.90
Long jump	Heike Drechsler; Germany	7.04w	Fiona May; Italy	6.98w	Nadine Caster; France	6.94
Triple jump	Ashia Hansen; Great Britain	14.37; CR	Yelena Sinchukova; Russia	14.30w	Zhanna Gureyeva; Belarus	14.25
Shot put	Astrid Kumbernuss; Germany	20.00	Irina Korzhanenko; Russia	18.32	Judy Oakes; Great Britain	18.17
Discus throw	Natalya Sadova; Russia	66.86	Ilke Wyludda; Germany	66.04	Irina Yatchenko; Belarus	64.46
Javelin throw	Steffi Nerius; Germany	68.42	Natalya Shikolenko; Belarus	63.42	Yekaterina Ivakina; Russia	61.36
WR world record | AR area record | CR championship record | GR games record | NR national record | OR Olympic record | PB personal best | SB season best | WL world leading (in a given season)

== First League ==
The First League was held on 10 and 11 June

=== Men ===
Group 1
Held in Basel, Switzerland

Pos.	Nation	Points
1	France	122.5
2	Norway	101
3	Czech Republic	98.5
4	Portugal	88
5	Switzerland	84
6	Denmark	80.5
7	Netherlands	73.5
8	Belgium	70

Group 2
Held in Turku, Finland

Pos.	Nation	Points
1	Finland	122
2	Belarus	102
3	Romania	101.5
4	Greece	100
5	Hungary	90.5
6	Latvia	83.5
7	Bulgaria	60.5
8	Slovakia	59

=== Women ===
Group 1
Held in Basel, Switzerland

Pos.	Nation	Points
1	Spain	94
2	Portugal	88
3	Czech Republic	86.5
4	Norway	82
5	Netherlands	78
6	Switzerland	74
7	Belgium	56
8	Austria	53.5

Group 2
Held in Turku, Finland

Pos.	Nation	Points
1	Bulgaria	117
2	Romania	106
3	Finland	74
4	Hungary	72
5	Greece	68
6	Sweden	65
7	Lithuania	46
8	Turkey	39

== Second League ==
The Second League was held on 10 and 11 June

=== Men ===
Group 1
Held in Tallinn, Estonia

Pos.	Nation	Points
1	Austria	109
2	Ireland	100
3	Yugoslavia	99
4	Estonia	85
5	Iceland	72
6	Lithuania	50
7	AASSE	43

Group 2
Held in Velenje, Slovenia

Pos.	Nation	Points
1	Slovenia	101
2	Turkey	95
3	Croatia	94
4	Cyprus	91
5	Moldova	73
6	Israel	71
7	Albania	30

=== Women ===
Group 1
Held in Tallinn, Estonia

Pos.	Nation	Points
1	Denmark	97
2	Iceland	81
3	Ireland	74
4	Estonia	72
5	Latvia	69
6	Yugoslavia	47
7	AASSE	35

Group 2
Held in Velenje, Slovenia

Pos.	Nation	Points
1	Slovenia	106
2	Croatia	88
3	Slovakia	79
4	Cyprus	64
5	Moldova	49
6	Albania	42
7	Israel	41
