= Carlo Simionato =

Italian sprinter (born 1961)

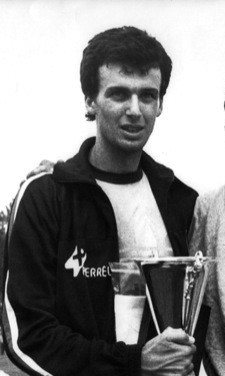

Personal information
- Nationality: Italian
- Born: July 1, 1961 (age 64) Ravenna, Italy
- Height: 1.78 m (5 ft 10 in)
- Weight: 66 kg (146 lb)

Sport
- Country: Italy
- Sport: Athletics
- Event: Sprint
- Club: Pro Patria Milano

Achievements and titles
- Personal bests: 100 m: 10.34 (1985); 200 m: 20.53 (1983)
Medal record
Event	1st	2nd	3rd
World Championships	0	1	0
Mediterranean Games	2	0	1
European Cup	1	0	2

Carlo Simionato (born 1 July 1961 in Ravenna) is a retired Italian sprinter who specialised in the 100 and 200 metres.

He won seven medals at the International athletics competitions, all of these with national relays team.

== Biography ==
At the World Championships in Helsinki in 1983 he finished seventh in the 200 metres final and won a silver medal with the relay team. He also finished fourth in 4 × 100 m relay at the 1982 European Championships, and won a bronze medal in 200 m at the 1983 Mediterranean Games.

On the national level he was the Italian 200 metres champion in 1982 and 1985, as well as 100 metres champion in 1985. He won the Italian indoor 200 metres in 1984. His personal best 200 metres time was 20.53 seconds, achieved in August 1983 in Riccione. His personal best 100 metres time was 10.34 seconds, achieved in July 1985 in Ravenna.

== Achievements ==
Year	Competition	Venue	Position	Event	Time	Notes
1983	World Championships	(Finland) Helsinki	2nd	4 × 100 m relay	38.37	
1983	Mediterranean Games	(Morocco) Casablanca	1st	4 × 100 m relay	38.76	
1983	Mediterranean Games	(Morocco) Casablanca	3rd	200 metres	20.63w	
1983	European Cup	(United Kingdom) London	1st	4 × 100 m relay	38.86	
1985	European Cup	(Soviet Union) Moscow	3rd	4 × 100 m relay	38.88	
1991	Mediterranean Games	(Greece) Athens	1st	4 × 100 m relay	39.12	
1991	European Cup	(Germany) Frankfurt	3rd	4 × 100 m relay	38.89	

== National titles ==
He has won 4 times the individual national championship.

- 1 win in the 100 metres (1985)
- 2 wins in the 200 metres (1982, 1985)
- 1 win in the 200 metres indoor (1984)

== See also ==
- Italian all-time lists - 200 metres
- Italy national relay team
