= Giovanni Puggioni =

Italian sprinter

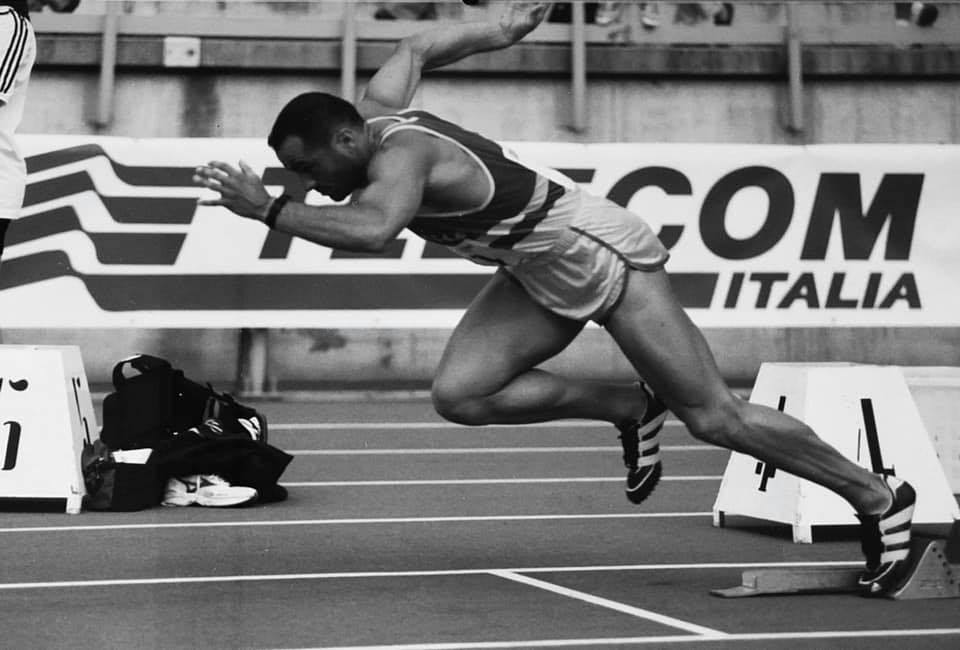
- Puggioni in 1996.

Personal information
- Nickname: Gianni
- National team: Italy: 21 caps (19898-1999)
- Born: March 19, 1966 (age 60) Sassari, Italy
- Height: 1.77 m (5 ft 10 in)
- Weight: 70 kg (154 lb)

Sport
- Country: Italy
- Sport: Athletics
- Event: Sprint
- Club: CUS Sassari (1985-1988); Fiamme Gialle (1989-2000)
- Retired: 2011

Achievements and titles
- Personal bests: 100 m: 10.36 (1995); 200 m: 20.44 (1997)
Medal record
| Event | 1st | 2nd | 3rd |
|---|---|---|---|
| World Championships | 0 | 0 | 1 |
| Mediterranean Games | 2 | 0 | 0 |
| European Cup | 1 | 1 | 0 |
| Military World Games | 1 | 1 | 0 |
| World Military Championships | 3 | 1 | 0 |
| Total | 7 | 3 | 1 |
World Championships
| Bronze medal – third place | 1995 Gothenbourg | 4x100 m relay |
Mediterranean Games
| Gold medal – first place | 1997 Bari | 200m |
| Gold medal – first place | 1997 Bari | 4x100 m relay |

Giovanni "Gianni" Puggioni (born 19 March 1966) is a former Italian sprinter who specialized in the 200 metres.

== Biography ==
Puggioni was born in Sassari, Sardinia, he won eleven medals at the International athletics competitions, five of these with national relays team. His personal best 200 metres time is 20.44 seconds, achieved at the 1997 Mediterranean Games in Bari. His personal best 100 metres time is 10.36 seconds, achieved in July 1995 in Cesenatico.

== Achievements ==
| Year | Competition | Venue | Rank | Event | Time | Notes |
|---|---|---|---|---|---|---|
| 1989 | Universiade | (West Germany) Duisburg | 17th | 200 m | 21.12 | |
| 1990 | European Championships | (United Kingdom) Glasgow | 14th | 200 m | 21.85 | |
| 1995 | World Championships | (Sweden) Gothenburg | 3rd | 4 × 100 m relay | 39.07 | |
| 1996 | Olympic Games | (United States) Atlanta | DNF | 4 × 100 m relay | no time | |
| 1997 | World Indoor Championships | (France) Paris | 30th | 60 m | 6.75 | CR |
| 1997 | World Indoor Championships | (France) Paris | DNF | 200 m | no time | |
| 1997 | Mediterranean Games | (Italy) Bari | 1st | 200 m | 20.44 | CR |
| 1997 | Mediterranean Games | (Italy) Bari | 1st | 4 × 100 m relay | 38.61 | CR |
| 1997 | World Championships | (Greece) Athens | QF | 200 m | 22.77 | |
| 1997 | World Championships | (Greece) Athens | SF | 4 × 100 m relay | 38.77 | |

== National titles ==
Puggioni won seven national championships at individual senior level.

- Italian Athletics Championships
  - 100 m: 1995, 1996 (2)
  - 200 m: 1990, 1997 (2)
- Italian Indoor Athletics Championships
  - 60 m: 1997 (1)
  - 200 m: 1991 (2)

== See also ==
- Italy national relay team
- Italy at the World Athletics Championships
- Italy at the Military World Games
- Italy at the European Cup
