= Luca Verdecchia =

Italian sprinter

Personal information
- Nationality: Italian
- Born: May 24, 1978 (age 48) Porto San Giorgio, Italy
- Height: 1.79 m (5 ft 10 1/2 in)
- Weight: 68 kg (150 lb)

Sport
- Country: Italy
- Sport: Athletics
- Event: Sprint
- Club: G.S. Fiamme Oro

Achievements and titles
- Personal bests: 100 m: 10.28 (2007); 200 m: 21.33 (2001); 60 m indoor: 6.59 (2005)
Medal record
Event	1st	2nd	3rd
Mediterranean Games	1	0	0
Universiade	1	0	2
European Cup	0	2	0
Universiade
Gold medal – first place	2005 Izmir	4x400 m relay
Bronze medal – third place	1999 Palma de Mallorca	4x400 m relay
Bronze medal – third place	2001 Beijing	4x400 m relay
Mediterranean Games
Gold medal – first place	2005 Almeria	4x400 m relay

Luca Verdecchia (born 24 May 1978, in Porto San Giorgio) is an Italian sprinter who specializes in the 60 and 100 metres.

== Biography ==
Luca Verdecchia won 6 medals with the national relay team at the International athletics competitions. He has 10 caps in national team from 1999 to 2007.

== National titles ==
He has won 1 time the individual national championship.

- 1 win in the 100 metres (2006)

== See also ==
- Italy national relay team
