= Nicola Asuni =

Italian sprinter (born 1973)

Personal information
- Nationality: Italian
- Born: 4 January 1973 (age 53) Cagliari, Italy
- Height: 1.79 m (5 ft 10 1/2 in)
- Weight: 72 kg (159 lb)

Sport
- Country: Italy
- Sport: Athletics
- Event: Sprint
- Club: Atletica Oristano

Achievements and titles
- Personal bests: 100 m: 10.36 (1997); 200 m: 20.99 (1997)
Medal record
Mediterranean Games
Gold medal – first place	1991 Athens	4x100 m relay
European Cup
Gold medal – first place	1997 Munich	4x100 m relay

Nicola Asuni (born 4 January 1973) is a former Italian sprinter.

== Biography ==
Nicola Asuni won two medals with the national relay team at the International athletics competitions.

== Achievements ==
Year	Competition	Venue	Position	Event	Time	Notes
1997	Mediterranean Games	(Italy) Bari	1st	4 × 100 m relay	38.61	

== National titles ==
Nicola Asuni has won just one time the national championship.

- 1 win in 4×100 metres relay (1998)

== See also ==
- Italy national relay team
