= Andrea Nuti =

Italian sprinter (born 1967)

Personal information
- Nationality: Italian
- Born: April 8, 1967 (age 59) Milan, Italy
- Height: 1.85 m (6 ft 1 in)
- Weight: 75 kg (165 lb)

Sport
- Country: Italy
- Sport: Athletics
- Event: 400 metres
- Club: Snam gas metano

Achievements and titles
- Personal best: 400 m: 45.35 (1996)
Medal record
Event	1st	2nd	3rd
World Indoor Championships	0	1	1
European Indoor Championships	0	1	0
Mediterranean Games	1	0	0
European Cup	0	1	1
World Indoor Championships
Bronze medal – third place	1991 Seville	4x400 m relay
Silver medal – second place	1995 Barcelona	4x400 m relay
European Indoor Championships
Silver medal – second place	1992 Genoa	400 m
Mediterranean Games
Gold medal – first place	1991 Athens	4x400 m relay
European Cup
Silver medal – second place	1995 Villeneuve d'Ascq	4x400 m relay
Bronze medal – third place	1991 Frankfurt	4x400 m relay

Andrea Nuti (born 8 April 1967 in Milan) is a retired Italian sprinter who specialized in the 400 metres.

== Biography ==
He won six medals at the International athletics competitions, five of these with national relays team. He participated at two editions of the Summer Olympics (1992 and 1996), he has 37 caps in national team from 1990 to 2000.

His personal best time is 45.35 seconds, achieved in July 1993 in Sestriere. Once finished his athletic career he has started working (2002) as physical trainer at Inter FC in the juvenile teams. In 2010 he was part of the technical staff of Mourinho's team and with Inter he won the Champions League in Madrid, on 22 May 2011.

== International competitions ==
Year	Competition	Venue	Position	Event	Notes
Representing Italy
1990	European Indoor Championships	Glasgow, United Kingdom	15th (h)	400 m	48.54
1990	European Championships	Split, Yugoslavia	12th (sf)	400m	46.11
1990	European Championships	Split, Yugoslavia	4th	4 × 400 m relay	3:01.78
1991	World Indoor Championships	Seville, Spain	3rd	4 × 400 m relay	3:05.51
1991	Mediterranean Games	Athens, Greece	5th	400 m	46.02
1991	Mediterranean Games	Athens, Greece	1st	4 × 400 m relay	3:03.20
1991	World Championships	Tokyo, Japan	31st (h)	400 m	46.80^{1}
1991	World Championships	Tokyo, Japan	11th (h)	4 × 400 m relay	3:02.72
1992	European Indoor Championships	Genoa, Italy	2nd	400 m	46.37
1992	Olympic Games	Barcelona, Spain	22nd (qf)	400 m	45.96
1992	Olympic Games	Barcelona, Spain	6th	4 × 400 m relay	3:02.18
1993	World Championships	Stuttgart, Germany	25th (qf)	400 m	46.77
1993	World Championships	Stuttgart, Germany	9th (h)	4 × 400 m relay	3:01.85
1994	European Indoor Championships	Paris, France	5th	400 m	50.05
1994	European Championships	Helsinki, Finland	17th (h)	400 m	46.87
1995	World Indoor Championships	Barcelona, Spain	–	400 m	DQ
1995	World Indoor Championships	Barcelona, Spain	2nd	4 × 400 m relay	3:09.12
1995	World Championships	Gothenburg, Sweden	20th (qf)	400 m	45.89
1995	World Championships	Gothenburg, Sweden	11th (h)	4 × 400 m relay	3:02.01
1996	Olympic Games	Atlanta, United States	9th (sf)	4 × 400 m relay	3:02.56
1997	World Indoor Championships	Paris, France	7th	4 × 400 m relay	3:09.98
1997	World Championships	Athens, Greece	7th	4 × 400 m relay	3:01.52
1998	European Championships	Budapest, Hungary	4th	4 × 400 m relay	3:02.48

^{1}Disqualified in the quarterfinals

== National titles ==
He has won 9 times the individual national championship.

- 5 wins in the 400 metres (1990, 1991, 1993, 1995, 1996)
- 4 wins in the 400 metres indoor (1990, 1991, 1992, 1994)

== See also ==
- Italian all-time lists - 400 metres
- Italy national relay team
