= Alessandro Aimar =

Italian sprinter (born 1967)

Personal information
- National team: Italy
- Born: 5 June 1967 (age 59) Milan, Italy
- Height: 1.78 m (5 ft 10 in)
- Weight: 68 kg (150 lb)

Sport
- Sport: Athletics
- Event: 400 metres
- Club: G.S. Fiamme Azzurre

Achievements and titles
- Personal best: 400 m: 45.76 (1993)
Medal record
Event	1st	2nd	3rd
World Indoor Championships	0	0	1
Mediterranean Games	1	1	0
European Cup	0	1	2
World Indoor Championships
Bronze medal – third place	1991 Seville	4x400 m relay
Mediterranean Games
Gold medal – first place	1991 Athens	4x400 m relay
Silver medal – second place	1993 NArbonne	4x400 m relay
European Cup
Silver medal – second place	1995 Villeneuve d'Ascq	4x400 m relay
Silver medal – second place	1997 Munich	4x400 m relay
Bronze medal – third place	1991 Frankfurt	4x400 m relay

Alessandro Aimar (born 5 June 1967 in Milan) is a retired Italian sprinter who specialized in the 400 metres.

== Biography ==
He won six medals at the International athletics competitions, all of these with national relays team. His personal best time is 45.76 seconds, achieved in July 1993 in Sestriere. He participated at two editions of the Summer Olympics (1992 and 1996), he has 30 caps in national team from 1989 to 1997.

== Achievements ==
Year	Competition	Venue	Position	Event	Notes
Representing Italy
1990	European Championships	Split, Yugoslavia	3rd (h)	4 × 400 m relay	3:04.08
1991	World Indoor Championships	Seville, Spain	3rd	4 × 400 m relay	3:05.51
1992	Olympic Games	Barcelona, Spain	6th	4 × 400 m relay	3:02.18
1994	European Championships	Helsinki, Finland	9th (sf)	400m	46.33
1994	European Championships	Helsinki, Finland	4th	4 × 400 m relay	3:03.46

== See also ==
- Italy national relay team
