= Massimiliano Donati =

Italian sprinter (born 1979)

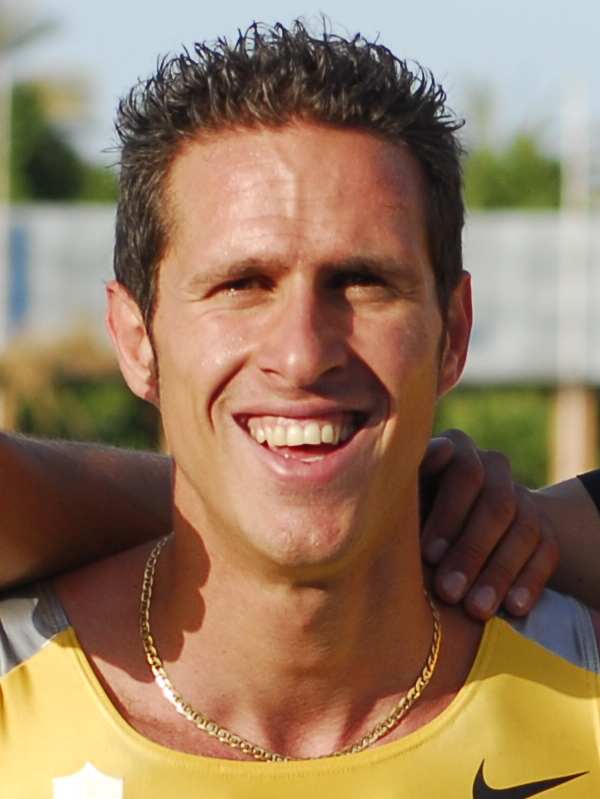
- Donati in 2006

Personal information
- Nationality: Italian
- Born: September 10, 1977 (age 48) Rieti, Italy
- Height: 1.83 m (6 ft 0 in)
- Weight: 74 kg (163 lb)

Sport
- Country: Italy
- Sport: Athletics
- Event: Sprint
- Club: G.S. Fiamme Gialle

Achievements and titles
- Personal best: 100 m: 10.35 (2006)
Medal record
Event	1st	2nd	3rd
Summer Universiade	1	0	1
Mediterranean Games	1	0	0
Military World Games	1	0	0
European Cup	1	1	1

Massimiliano Donati (born 16 June 1979) is an Italian former sprinter.

== Biography ==
Donati won seven medals at the International athletics competitions, all of these with national relays team. He participated at one edition of the Summer Olympics (2004), he has 16 caps in national team from 1998 to 2007. He is the brother of Roberto Donati.

== National titles ==
He has won 3 times the individual national championship.

- 1 win in the 60 metres indoor (2007)
- 2 wins in the 200 metres indoor (2004, 2005)

== See also ==
- Italy national relay team
