= Marco Vaccari =

Italian sprinter (born 1966)

Personal information
- National team: Italy
- Born: 17 July 1966 (age 59) Milan, Italy
- Height: 1.89 m (6 ft 2 in)
- Weight: 69 kg (152 lb)

Sport
- Sport: Athletics
- Event: 400 metres
- Club: G.S. Fiamme Azzurre

Achievements and titles
- Personal best: 400 m: 45.47 (1992)
Medal record
Event	1st	2nd	3rd
World Indoor Championships	0	0	1
Mediterranean Games	1	1	0
European Cup	0	1	2
Military World Games	0	0	1
Total	1	2	4
World Indoor Championships
Bronze medal – third place	1991 Seville	4x400 m relay
Mediterranean Games
Gold medal – first place	1991 Athens	4x400 m relay
Silver medal – second place	1997 Bari	400 m
Military World Games
Bronze medal – third place	1995 Rome	4x400 m relay
European Cup
Silver medal – second place	1995 Villeneuve d'Ascq	4x400 m relay
Silver medal – second place	1997 Munich	4x400 m relay
Bronze medal – third place	1991 Frankfurt	4x400 m relay

Marco Vaccari (born 17 July 1966 in Milan) is a retired Italian sprinter who specialized in the 400 metres.

== Career ==
Vaccari won seven medals in international athletics competitions, six of these with national relays team. His personal best time is 45.47 seconds, achieved in June 1992 in Bologna. He participated at two editions of the Summer Olympics (1992 and 1996), he earned 36 caps with the national team from 1989 to 1999.

== Achievements ==
Year	Competition	Venue	Position	Event	Notes
Representing Italy
1991	World Indoor Championships	Seville, Spain	3rd	4 × 400 m relay	3:05.51
1991	Mediterranean Games	Athens, Greece	1st	4 × 400 m relay	3:03.20
1992	European Indoor Championships	Genoa, Italy	5th	400 m	47.18
1992	Olympic Games	Barcelona, Spain	6th	4 × 400 m relay	3:02.18
1994	European Championships	Helsinki, Finland	12th (sf)	400m	46.57
1994	European Championships	Helsinki, Finland	4th	4 × 400 m relay	3:03.46
1997	World Championships	Athens, Greece	7th	4 × 400 m relay	3:01.52
1997	Mediterranean Games	Bari, Italy	2nd	400 m	45.74
1998	World Cup	Johannesburg, South Africa	6th	4 × 400 m relay	3:03.95

== National titles ==
He has won six individual national championship titles.

- 400 metres: 1992, 1994, 1997, 1999
- 200 metres indoor: 1996
- 400 metres indoor: 1997

== See also ==
- Italian all-time lists - 400 metres
- Italy national relay team
