= Fabio Grossi (athlete) =

Italian sprinter (born 1967)

Personal information
- Full name: Fabio Francesco Grossi
- Nationality: Italian
- Born: 3 September 1967 (age 59) Milan, Italy
- Height: 1.85 m (6 ft 1 in)
- Weight: 72 kg (159 lb)

Sport
- Country: Italy
- Sport: Athletics
- Event: 400 metres
- Club: Snam Gas Metano

Achievements and titles
- Personal best: 400 m: 45.92 (1994)
Medal record
Event	1st	2nd	3rd
World Indoor Championships	0	1	0
Mediterranean Games	1	1	0
World Indoor Championships
Silver medal – second place	1995 Barcelona	4x400 m relay
Mediterranean Games
Gold medal – first place	1991 Athens	4x400 m relay
Silver medal – second place	1991 Athens	400 m

Fabio Francesco Grossi (born 3 September 1967, in Milan) is a retired Italian sprinter who specialized in the 400 metres.

== Biography ==
Fabio Grossi won three medals at the International athletics competitions, two of these with national relays team. His personal best time is 45.92 seconds, achieved in September 1994 in Bologna. He participated at one edition of the Summer Olympics (1992), he has 21 caps in national team from 1989 to 1996.

== Achievements ==
Year	Competition	Venue	Position	Event	Notes
Representing Italy
1990	European Championships	Split, Yugoslavia	3rd (h)	4 × 400 m relay	3:04.08
1991	Mediterranean Games	Athens, Greece	1st	400 m	45.93
1991	Mediterranean Games	Athens, Greece	2nd	4 × 400 m relay	3:03.20
1992	Olympic Games	Barcelona, Spain	7th	4×400 metres	3:02.18
1994	European Championships	Helsinki, Finland	4th	4 × 400 m relay	3:03.46
1995	World Indoor Championships	Barcelona, Spain	2nd	4 × 400 m relay	3:09.12

== National titles ==
He has won 1 time the individual national championship.

- 1 win in the 400 metres indoor (1993)

== See also ==
- Italy national relay team
