= Angelo Cipolloni =

Italian sprinter (born 1970)

Personal information
- Nationality: Italian
- Born: 16 February 1970 (age 56) Rieti, Italy
- Height: 1.78 m (5 ft 10 in)
- Weight: 73 kg (161 lb)

Sport
- Country: Italy
- Sport: Athletics
- Event: Sprint
Medal record
| Event | 1st | 2nd | 3rd |
|---|---|---|---|
| World Championships | 0 | 0 | 1 |
| Summer Universiade | 0 | 0 | 1 |
| Mediterranean Games | 1 | 0 | 0 |
| European Cup | 1 | 1 | 1 |
| Military World Games | 1 | 0 | 1 |
| Total | 3 | 1 | 4 |

Angelo Cipolloni (born 16 February 1970, in Rieti) is a retired Italian sprinter who specialized in the 100 and 200 metre races.

== Biography ==
He won eight medals at the International athletics competitions, seven of these with national relays team. His personal best 200 metres time is 20.79 seconds, achieved in September 1996 in Rieti. His personal best 100 metres time is 10.37 seconds, achieved in June 1997 in Rome.

== Achievements ==
| Year | Competition | Venue | Position | Event | Time | Notes |
|---|---|---|---|---|---|---|
| 1995 | World Championships | (Sweden) Gothenburg | 3rd | 4 × 100 m relay | 39.07 | |
| 1995 | Summer Universiade | (Japan) Fukuoka | 3rd | 4 × 100 m relay | 39.64 | |
| 1995 | Military World Games | (Italy) Rome | 1st | 4 × 100 m relay | 40.20 | |
| 1995 | Military World Games | (Italy) Rome | 3rd | 200 metres | 21.00 | |
| 1997 | Mediterranean Games | (Italy) Bari | 1st | 4 × 100 m relay | 38.61 | |

== National titles ==
He has won 4 times the individual national championship.

- 2 wins in the 200 metres (1995, 1996)
- 2 wins in the 200 metres indoor (1995, 1997)

== See also ==
- Italy national relay team
