= Athletics at the 1989 Summer Universiade – Men's 100 metres =

The men's 100 metres event at the 1989 Summer Universiade was held at the Wedaustadion in Duisburg with the final on 25 and 26 August 1989.

== Medalists ==
Gold	Silver	Bronze
Andre Cason; United States	Olapade Adeniken; Nigeria	Joel Isasi; Cuba

== Results ==
=== Heats ===
Wind:
Heat 1: +0.8 m/s, Heat 2: +0.6 m/s, Heat 3: 0.0 m/s, Heat 4: +0.8 m/s, Heat 5: +1.2 m/s, Heat 6: +0.8 m/s, Heat 7: +0.4 m/s

Rank	Heat	Athlete	Nationality	Time	Notes
1	7	Slip Watkins	United States	10.24	Q
2	3	Andre Cason	United States	10.26	Q
3	6	Olapade Adeniken	Nigeria	10.29	Q
4	7	Pierfrancesco Pavoni	Italy	10.31	Q
5	4	Shinji Aoto	Japan	10.38	Q
6	1	Joel Isasi	Cuba	10.39	Q
7	2	Amadou M'Baye	Senegal	10.40	Q
8	5	Patrick Stevens	Belgium	10.44	Q
9	1	Andreas Maul	West Germany	10.47	Q
9	6	Andy Carrott	Great Britain	10.47	Q
11	3	Ousmane Diarra	Mali	10.48	Q
12	4	Andrey Razin	Soviet Union	10.53	Q
13	5	Igor Groshev	Soviet Union	10.55	Q
13	7	René Mangold	Switzerland	10.55	Q
15	2	Hiroki Fuwa	Japan	10.57	Q
16	2	Cyprian Enweani	Canada	10.57	Q
16	5	Sérgio Menezes	Brazil	10.59	Q
18	4	Valentín Rocandio	Spain	10.60	Q
18	6	Domenico Gorla	Italy	10.60	Q
20	5	Jamie Henderson	Great Britain	10.61	Q
21	1	Alain Reimann	Switzerland	10.63	Q
21	4	Tsai Yi-chen	Chinese Taipei	10.63	Q
23	6	Laurent Nevo	France	10.64	Q
24	3	Cheng Hsin-fu	Chinese Taipei	10.65	Q
25	2	Ricardo Chacón	Cuba	10.66	Q
25	6	Benyoucef Aissa Khelifa	Algeria	10.66	q
27	1	Babacar Pouye	Senegal	10.72	Q
28	7	Óscar Fernández	Peru	10.73	Q
29	3	Florencio Gascón	Spain	10.75	Q
29	7	Itai Iluz	Israel	10.75	q
31	2	Ayhan Bodur	Turkey	10.76	q
32	7	Luís Cunha	Portugal	10.77	q
33	5	Hugh Percy	New Zealand	10.84	
34	4	Jules Kémobé	Chad	10.86	
35	1	Endre Havas	Hungary	10.87	
36	2	Aris Georgiades	Cyprus	10.89	
37	5	Andrew Meya	Uganda	11.04	
38	6	Hau Yiu Chung	Hong Kong	11.06	
39	3	David Dworjanyn	Australia	11.10	
40	3	Tran Duy Kham	Vietnam	11.13	
41	6	Montri Kumpirom	Thailand	11.14	
42	5	Lam Wai Keung	Hong Kong	11.18	
43	2	Michael Ojok	Uganda	11.19	
44	4	Mohamed Mehdi Hasan	Bangladesh	11.22	
44	6	Robert Loua	Guinea	11.22	
46	4	Tawel Camara Sankoumba	Guinea	11.31	
47	1	Edmund Chehura	Zimbabwe	11.34	
48	1	Nguyen Phuong	Vietnam	11.37	
49	3	Mohamed Shah Jalal	Bangladesh	11.46	
50	3	Andrzej Popa	Poland	11.51	
51	7	Bringle Kgabanyane	Botswana	11.54	
52	7	David Dotaona	Papua New Guinea	11.57	
53	4	Fidelis Humba	Tanzania	11.72	
54	5	Tarek Maoussali	Lebanon	12.00	
55	2	Abdallah Faiz	Mauritania	12.65	

=== Quarterfinals ===
Wind:
Heat 1: +2.9 m/s, Heat 2: +1.0 m/s, Heat 3: +1.1 m/s, Heat 4: +1.8 m/s

Rank	Heat	Athlete	Nationality	Time	Notes
1	4	Andre Cason	United States	10.07	Q
2	1	Pierfrancesco Pavoni	Italy	10.13	Q
3	3	Olapade Adeniken	Nigeria	10.16	Q
4	3	Joel Isasi	Cuba	10.26	Q
5	2	Slip Watkins	United States	10.27	Q
6	1	Hiroki Fuwa	Japan	10.33	Q
7	1	Andrey Razin	Soviet Union	10.35	Q
8	4	Amadou M'Baye	Senegal	10.36	Q
9	2	Patrick Stevens	Belgium	10.37	Q
10	1	Shinji Aoto	Japan	10.38	q
11	2	Andy Carrott	Great Britain	10.44	Q
12	4	Andreas Maul	West Germany	10.46	Q
13	1	Jamie Henderson	Great Britain	10.49	q
14	3	Ousmane Diarra	Mali	10.50	Q
14	4	Ricardo Chacón	Cuba	10.50	q
16	2	Cyprian Enweani	Canada	10.51	q
17	3	René Mangold	Switzerland	10.58	
18	4	Igor Groshev	Soviet Union	10.59	
19	1	Alain Reimann	Switzerland	10.60	
19	2	Sérgio Menezes	Brazil	10.60	
19	3	Valentín Rocandio	Spain	10.60	
22	2	Cheng Hsin-fu	Chinese Taipei	10.61	
23	1	Florencio Gascón	Spain	10.62	
24	1	Itai Iluz	Israel	10.65	
25	2	Benyoucef Aissa Khelifa	Algeria	10.69	
25	4	Laurent Nevo	France	10.69	
27	3	Óscar Fernández	Peru	10.73	
28	3	Tsai Yi-chen	Chinese Taipei	10.75	
29	2	Babacar Pouye	Senegal	10.76	
30	4	Domenico Gorla	Italy	10.78	
31	4	Luís Cunha	Portugal	10.78	
32	3	Ayhan Bodur	Turkey	10.88	

=== Semifinals ===
Wind:
Heat 1: -1.4 m/s, Heat 2: +0.5 m/s

Rank	Heat	Athlete	Nationality	Time	Notes
1	2	Andre Cason	United States	10.31	Q
2	1	Olapade Adeniken	Nigeria	10.42	Q
3	1	Slip Watkins	United States	10.45	Q
4	1	Pierfrancesco Pavoni	Italy	10.51	Q
5	2	Joel Isasi	Cuba	10.59	Q
6	1	Andrey Razin	Soviet Union	10.62	Q
7	2	Patrick Stevens	Belgium	10.65	Q
8	2	Amadou M'Baye	Senegal	10.66	Q
9	1	Andy Carrott	Great Britain	10.68	
10	2	Andreas Maul	West Germany	10.69	
11	2	Hiroki Fuwa	Japan	10.69	
12	1	Shinji Aoto	Japan	10.71	
12	2	Cyprian Enweani	Canada	10.71	
14	2	Jamie Henderson	Great Britain	10.76	
15	1	Ousmane Diarra	Mali	10.78	
16	1	Ricardo Chacón	Cuba	10.82	

=== Final ===
Wind: -1.3 m/s

Rank	Athlete	Nationality	Time	Notes
1st place, gold medalist(s)	Andre Cason	United States	10.29	
2nd place, silver medalist(s)	Olapade Adeniken	Nigeria	10.35	
3rd place, bronze medalist(s)	Joel Isasi	Cuba	10.41	
4	Slip Watkins	United States	10.46	
5	Pierfrancesco Pavoni	Italy	10.47	
6	Amadou M'Baye	Senegal	10.58	
7	Patrick Stevens	Belgium	10.66	
8	Andrey Razin	Soviet Union	10.73	
