= 1986 World Junior Championships in Athletics – Men's 100 metres =

The men's 100 metres event at the 1986 World Junior Championships in Athletics was held in Athens, Greece, at Olympic Stadium on 16 and 17 July.

== Medalists ==
Gold	Derrick Florence; United States
Silver	Stanley Kerr; United States
Bronze	Jamie Henderson; United Kingdom

== Results ==
=== Final ===
17 July
Wind: +0.9 m/s

Rank	Name	Nationality	Time	Notes
1st place, gold medalist(s)	Derrick Florence	United States	10.17	
2nd place, silver medalist(s)	Stanley Kerr	United States	10.23	
3rd place, bronze medalist(s)	Jamie Henderson	United Kingdom	10.34	
4	Matthias Schlicht	West Germany	10.43	
5	David Kirton	United Kingdom	10.50	
6	Obinna Eregbu	Nigeria	10.52	
7	Nikolay Antonov	Bulgaria	10.53	
8	Krasimir Bozhinovski	Bulgaria	10.64	

=== Semifinals ===
17 July

==== Semifinal 1 ====
Wind: +1.9 m/s

Rank	Name	Nationality	Time	Notes
1	Derrick Florence	United States	10.27	Q
2	Jamie Henderson	United Kingdom	10.41	Q
3	Matthias Schlicht	West Germany	10.42	Q
4	Krasimir Bozhinovski	Bulgaria	10.54	Q
5	Jacek Konopka	Poland	10.61	
6	Luis Smith	Panama	10.64	
7	Eduardo Nava	Mexico	10.68	
8	Aleksandr Kutepov	Soviet Union	10.69	

==== Semifinal 2 ====
Wind: +1.7 m/s

Rank	Name	Nationality	Time	Notes
1	Stanley Kerr	United States	10.25	Q
2	David Kirton	United Kingdom	10.48	Q
3	Nikolay Antonov	Bulgaria	10.49	Q
4	Obinna Eregbu	Nigeria	10.50	Q
5	Steve McBain	Australia	10.51	
6	Romans Osipenko	Soviet Union	10.54	
7	Bernard Chatam	France	10.56	
8	Ingo Todt	West Germany	10.62	

=== Quarterfinals ===
17 July

==== Quarterfinal 1 ====
Wind: -0.5 m/s

Rank	Name	Nationality	Time	Notes
1	Derrick Florence	United States	10.60	Q
2	Nikolay Antonov	Bulgaria	10.72	Q
3	Romans Osipenko	Soviet Union	10.81	Q
4	Steve McBain	Australia	10.81	Q
5	Alain Reimann	Switzerland	10.83	
6	Arcangelo Mariano	Italy	10.87	
7	Roberto Martínez	Cuba	10.92	
8	Masahiro Nagura	Japan	10.98	

==== Quarterfinal 2 ====
Wind: -1.0 m/s

Rank	Name	Nationality	Time	Notes
1	David Kirton	United Kingdom	10.58	Q
2	Bernard Chatam	France	10.63	Q
3	Obinna Eregbu	Nigeria	10.64	Q
4	Ingo Todt	West Germany	10.68	Q
5	Ho Sung-Won	South Korea	10.75	
6	Pongsak Wacharakupt	Thailand	10.86	
	José Miguel Méndez	Dominican Republic	DNS	
	Mohamed Bakr Al-Housaoui	Saudi Arabia	DNS	

==== Quarterfinal 3 ====
Wind: -2.7 m/s

Rank	Name	Nationality	Time	Notes
1	Stanley Kerr	United States	10.50	Q
2	Matthias Schlicht	West Germany	10.67	Q
3	Aleksandr Kutepov	Soviet Union	10.76	Q
4	Eduardo Nava	Mexico	10.89	Q
5	Joel Isasi	Cuba	10.96	
6	Michele Lazazzera	Italy	10.97	
7	Mohamed El-Kandoussi	Morocco	10.98	
8	Indra Nugraha	Indonesia	11.04	

==== Quarterfinal 4 ====
Wind: -0.1 m/s

Rank	Name	Nationality	Time	Notes
1	Jamie Henderson	United Kingdom	10.48	Q
2	Jacek Konopka	Poland	10.61	Q
3	Krasimir Bozhinovski	Bulgaria	10.69	Q
4	Luis Smith	Panama	10.70	Q
5	Abdullah Tetengi	Nigeria	10.71	
6	Desmond Griffiths	Canada	10.71	
7	Diego Gómez	Spain	10.79	
8	Koichi Igarashi	Japan	10.88	

=== Heats ===
16 July

==== Heat 1 ====
Wind: +2.2 m/s

Rank	Name	Nationality	Time	Notes
1	Nikolay Antonov	Bulgaria	10.53 w	Q
2	Luis Smith	Panama	10.61 w	Q
3	Steve McBain	Australia	10.63 w	q
4	Mohamed Al-Bishi	Saudi Arabia	10.93 w	
5	Tsegaye Wolde Iyesus	Ethiopia	11.17 w	
6	Kesavan Sivabalan	Malaysia	11.17 w	
7	Robert Outerbridge	Bermuda	11.22 w	
8	Ahmed Hassan Rawiah	North Yemen	11.63 w	

==== Heat 2 ====
Wind: +1.7 m/s

Rank	Name	Nationality	Time	Notes
1	Derrick Florence	United States	10.65	Q
2	Roberto Martínez	Cuba	10.85	Q
3	Li Tong	China	11.08	
4	Ossama Hassan	Egypt	11.32	
5	Carlos Oliveira	Uruguay	11.43	
6	Joey Yean Chuan Khoo	Singapore	11.43	
7	Francisco Raimundo	Angola	11.49	
8	Reece Kalsakau	Vanuatu	11.56	

==== Heat 3 ====
Wind: -2.9 m/s

Rank	Name	Nationality	Time	Notes
1	Stanley Kerr	United States	10.56	Q
2	Ingo Todt	West Germany	10.76	Q
3	Marek Parjaszewski	Poland	10.97	
4	Augusto Cavadini	Switzerland	11.34	
5	William Akanoa	Cook Islands	12.00	
6	Ahmed Mohamed	Comoros	13.07	

==== Heat 4 ====
Wind: -2.4 m/s

Rank	Name	Nationality	Time	Notes
1	Jacek Konopka	Poland	10.72	Q
2	Bernard Chatam	France	10.76	Q
3	Enrique Talavera	Spain	10.91	
4	Nelson Boateng	Ghana	11.12	
5	Martin Körling	Sweden	11.21	
6	Sakol Boukom	Thailand	11.39	
7	Michel Bibi	Seychelles	11.46	
8	Ahmed Asimiaz	Afghanistan	12.10	

==== Heat 5 ====
Wind: +2.5 m/s

Rank	Name	Nationality	Time	Notes
1	Jamie Henderson	United Kingdom	10.55 w	Q
2	Desmond Griffiths	Canada	10.69 w	Q
3	Mohamed El-Kandoussi	Morocco	10.71 w	q
4	Indra Nugraha	Indonesia	10.77 w	q
5	Timothy Clinton	Bahamas	10.96 w	
6	Padmakumar Amarasekera	Sri Lanka	11.13 w	
7	Mohamed Ali Moubarak	United Arab Emirates	11.62 w	

==== Heat 6 ====
Wind: +1.0 m/s

Rank	Name	Nationality	Time	Notes
1	Krasimir Bozhinovski	Bulgaria	10.79	Q
2	Abdullah Tetengi	Nigeria	10.83	Q
3	Ioannis Zisimides	Cyprus	10.89	
4	Yeóryios Kiriakídis	Greece	11.05	
5	Aceng Rumaedi	Indonesia	11.27	
6	Andy St. Remy	U.S. Virgin Islands	11.40	
7	Henri Ngamotendi	Congo	11.42	

==== Heat 7 ====
Wind: +2.5 m/s

Rank	Name	Nationality	Time	Notes
1	David Kirton	United Kingdom	10.42 w	Q
2	Michele Lazazzera	Italy	10.83 w	Q
3	Michael Charles	Canada	10.95 w	
4	Horace Dove-Edwin	Sierra Leone	11.00 w	
5	Claire Soleyne	Antigua and Barbuda	11.07 w	
6	Francisco Colorado	El Salvador	11.16 w	
7	Said Ahmed Fayez	South Yemen	11.34 w	
8	Ebenezer Lawson	Ghana	11.44 w	

==== Heat 8 ====
Wind: +1.1 m/s

Rank	Name	Nationality	Time	Notes
1	Matthias Schlicht	West Germany	10.59	Q
2	Arcangelo Mariano	Italy	10.73	Q
3	Eduardo Nava	Mexico	10.77	q
4	Koichi Igarashi	Japan	10.77	q
5	Hoon Kim Seng	Singapore	10.96	
6	Carlos Moreno	Chile	10.98	
7	Alvin Daniel	Trinidad and Tobago	11.01	
8	Pedro Pérez	Puerto Rico	11.02	

==== Heat 9 ====
Rank	Name	Nationality	Time	Notes
1	Alain Reimann	Switzerland	10.78	Q
2	Joel Isasi	Cuba	10.80	Q
3	Dazel Jules	Trinidad and Tobago	10.92	
4	Milan Petaković	Yugoslavia	10.97	
5	David Dworjanyn	Australia	11.00	
6	Dalip Sarkar	India	11.29	
7	Aris Cefai	Malta	11.73	

==== Heat 10 ====
Wind: +1.0 m/s

Rank	Name	Nationality	Time	Notes
1	José Miguel Méndez	Dominican Republic	10.64	Q
2	Obinna Eregbu	Nigeria	10.65	Q
3	Masahiro Nagura	Japan	10.77	q
4	Diego Gómez	Spain	10.77	q
5	Romans Osipenko	Soviet Union	10.79	q
6	Mohamed Bakr Al-Housaoui	Saudi Arabia	10.86	q
7	Emmanuel Mack	Papua New Guinea	10.99	

==== Heat 11 ====
Wind: -2.0 m/s

Rank	Name	Nationality	Time	Notes
1	Aleksandr Kutepov	Soviet Union	10.72	Q
2	Pongsak Wacharakupt	Thailand	10.79	Q
3	Ho Sung-Won	South Korea	10.79	q
4	Glendale Miller	Bahamas	10.88	
5	Stephen Lewis	Montserrat	10.90	
6	Maloni Bole	Fiji	11.05	
7	Richard Dolmetsch	Colombia	11.66	

== Participation ==
According to an unofficial count, 81 athletes from 60 countries participated in the event.

- Afghanistan (1)
- Angola (1)
- Antigua and Barbuda (1)
- Australia (2)
- Bahamas (2)
- Bermuda (1)
- Bulgaria (2)
- Canada (2)
- Chile (1)
- China (1)
- Colombia (1)
- Comoros (1)
- Congo (1)
- Cook Islands (1)
- Cuba (2)
- Cyprus (1)
- Dominican Republic (1)
- Egypt (1)
- El Salvador (1)
- Ethiopia (1)
- Fiji (1)
- France (1)
- Ghana (2)
- Greece (1)
- India (1)
- Indonesia (2)
- Italy (2)
- Japan (2)
- Malaysia (1)
- Malta (1)
- Mexico (1)
- Montserrat (1)
- Morocco (1)
- Nigeria (2)
- North Yemen (1)
- Panama (1)
- Papua New Guinea (1)
- Poland (2)
- Puerto Rico (1)
- Saudi Arabia (2)
- Seychelles (1)
- Sierra Leone (1)
- Singapore (2)
- South Korea (1)
- South Yemen (1)
- Soviet Union (2)
- Spain (2)
- Sri Lanka (1)
- Sweden (1)
- Switzerland (2)
- Thailand (2)
- Trinidad and Tobago (2)
- United Arab Emirates (1)
- United Kingdom (2)
- United States (2)
- Uruguay (1)
- U.S. Virgin Islands (1)
- Vanuatu (1)
- West Germany (2)
- Yugoslavia (1)
