= 1986 World Junior Championships in Athletics – Men's 200 metres =

The men's 200 metres event at the 1986 World Junior Championships in Athletics was held in Athens, Greece, at Olympic Stadium on 18 and 19 July.

== Medalists ==
Gold	Stanley Kerr; United States
Silver	Derrick Florence; United States
Bronze	Steve McBain; Australia

== Results ==
=== Final ===
19 July
Wind: +0.2 m/s

Rank	Name	Nationality	Time	Notes
1st place, gold medalist(s)	Stanley Kerr	United States	20.74	
2nd place, silver medalist(s)	Derrick Florence	United States	21.12	
3rd place, bronze medalist(s)	Steve McBain	Australia	21.21	
4	Nikolay Antonov	Bulgaria	21.37	
5	Phil Goedluck	United Kingdom	21.38	
6	Jarosław Kaniecki	Poland	21.46	
7	Michael Newbold	Bahamas	21.50	
8	Ivo Rýznar	Czechoslovakia	21.71	

=== Semifinals ===
18 July

==== Semifinal 1 ====
Wind: +0.6 m/s

Rank	Name	Nationality	Time	Notes
1	Stanley Kerr	United States	20.78	Q
2	Phil Goedluck	United Kingdom	21.32	Q
3	Steve McBain	Australia	21.38	Q
4	Ivo Rýznar	Czechoslovakia	21.44	Q
5	Masahiro Nagura	Japan	21.45	
6	Frank Kobor	West Germany	21.57	
7	Lars Hedner	Sweden	21.62	
8	Jarosław Lewandowicz	Poland	22.10	

==== Semifinal 2 ====
Wind: -0.6 m/s

Rank	Name	Nationality	Time	Notes
1	Derrick Florence	United States	21.08	Q
2	Jarosław Kaniecki	Poland	21.37	Q
3	Nikolay Antonov	Bulgaria	21.39	Q
4	Michael Newbold	Bahamas	21.42	Q
5	Mark Garner	Australia	21.42	
6	Abdullah Tetengi	Nigeria	21.57	
7	Oliver Schmidt	West Germany	21.58	
8	Grant Gilbert	New Zealand	21.96	

=== Quarterfinals ===
18 July

==== Quarterfinal 1 ====
Wind: +0.6 m/s

Rank	Name	Nationality	Time	Notes
1	Mark Garner	Australia	21.21	Q
2	Nikolay Antonov	Bulgaria	21.32	Q
3	Abdullah Tetengi	Nigeria	21.36	Q
4	Lars Hedner	Sweden	21.47	Q
5	Desmond Griffiths	Canada	21.53	
6	Sergey Klyonov	Soviet Union	21.77	
7	Ho Sung-Won	South Korea	21.78	
	Roberto Hernández	Cuba	DNS	

==== Quarterfinal 2 ====
Wind: +1.6 m/s

Rank	Name	Nationality	Time	Notes
1	Derrick Florence	United States	21.16	Q
2	Phil Goedluck	United Kingdom	21.25	Q
3	Frank Kobor	West Germany	21.34	Q
4	Jarosław Lewandowicz	Poland	21.57	Q
5	José Luis Arrazola	Spain	21.64	
6	Mark Johnson	Bahamas	21.79	
	Alvin Daniel	Trinidad and Tobago	DNS	
	Eduardo Nava	Mexico	DNS	

==== Quarterfinal 3 ====
Wind: +1.5 m/s

Rank	Name	Nationality	Time	Notes
1	Stanley Kerr	United States	20.83	Q
2	Michael Newbold	Bahamas	21.36	Q
3	Masahiro Nagura	Japan	21.38	Q
4	Oliver Schmidt	West Germany	21.43	Q
5	Alberto Martilli	Italy	21.58	
6	Diego Gómez	Spain	21.74	
7	Pel van de Kerkhof	Netherlands	21.78	
8	Mohamed El-Kandoussi	Morocco	21.99	

==== Quarterfinal 4 ====
Wind: -0.1 m/s

Rank	Name	Nationality	Time	Notes
1	Steve McBain	Australia	21.21	Q
2	Jarosław Kaniecki	Poland	21.33	Q
3	Ivo Rýznar	Czechoslovakia	21.33	Q
4	Grant Gilbert	New Zealand	21.51	Q
5	Yaya Adesina	Nigeria	21.52	
6	Koichi Igarashi	Japan	21.82	
7	Avi Nisenkorn	Israel	21.93	
8	Krasimir Bozhinovski	Bulgaria	22.43	

=== Heats ===
18 July

==== Heat 1 ====
Wind: -0.8 m/s

Rank	Name	Nationality	Time	Notes
1	Stanley Kerr	United States	21.06	Q
2	Alberto Martilli	Italy	21.72	Q
3	Desmond Griffiths	Canada	21.73	q
4	Mohamed El-Kandoussi	Morocco	22.01	q
5	Ronnie Sköld	Sweden	22.09	
6	Aris Cefai	Malta	23.27	
7	Reece Kalsakau	Vanuatu	23.63	
8	Fayaka Dumbar	Liberia	24.02	

==== Heat 2 ====
Wind: +0.2 m/s

Rank	Name	Nationality	Time	Notes
1	Phil Goedluck	United Kingdom	21.36	Q
2	Nikolay Antonov	Bulgaria	21.92	Q
3	Mohamed Al-Bishi	Saudi Arabia	22.12	
4	Brad McCuaig	Canada	22.18	
5	Stephen Lewis	Montserrat	22.36	
6	Francisco Raimundo	Angola	22.94	

==== Heat 3 ====
Wind: +1.5 m/s

Rank	Name	Nationality	Time	Notes
1	Oliver Schmidt	West Germany	21.49	Q
2	José Luis Arrazola	Spain	21.77	Q
3	Joel Isasi	Cuba	22.15	
4	Maloni Bole	Fiji	22.15	
5	Claire Soleyne	Antigua and Barbuda	22.71	
6	Francisco Colorado	El Salvador	22.80	
7	Awad Ead Awad	Egypt	22.93	
8	William Akanoa	Cook Islands	23.63	

==== Heat 4 ====
Wind: +0.3 m/s

Rank	Name	Nationality	Time	Notes
1	Krasimir Bozhinovski	Bulgaria	21.57	Q
2	Jarosław Lewandowicz	Poland	21.62	Q
3	Diego Gómez	Spain	21.82	q
4	Grant Gilbert	New Zealand	21.94	q
5	Mikhail Vdovin	Soviet Union	22.19	
6	Emmanuel Mack	Papua New Guinea	22.29	
7	Yves Bolanga	Cameroon	23.54	
8	Nadim Aboud	Lebanon	23.82	

==== Heat 5 ====
Wind: +0.2 m/s

Rank	Name	Nationality	Time	Notes
1	Lars Hedner	Sweden	21.66	Q
2	Michael Newbold	Bahamas	21.73	Q
3	Koichi Igarashi	Japan	21.74	q
4	Mohamed Bakr Al-Housaoui	Saudi Arabia	22.21	
5	Tsegaye Wolde Iyesus	Ethiopia	22.33	
6	Robert Outerbridge	Bermuda	22.73	
7	Ho Kwok Wai	Hong Kong	23.24	

==== Heat 6 ====
Wind: +0.7 m/s

Rank	Name	Nationality	Time	Notes
1	Derrick Florence	United States	21.61	Q
2	Sergey Klyonov	Soviet Union	21.80	Q
3	Ho Sung-Won	South Korea	21.98	q
4	Konstadínos Labrópoulos	Greece	22.05	
5	Andriants Razafimanantjoa	Madagascar	22.80	
6	Livasoa Randrianjatovo	Madagascar	22.98	
7	Said Ahmed Fayez	South Yemen	23.42	

==== Heat 7 ====
Wind: +0.3 m/s

Rank	Name	Nationality	Time	Notes
1	Roberto Hernández	Cuba	21.20	Q
2	Mark Garner	Australia	21.42	Q
3	Avi Nisenkorn	Israel	21.97	q
4	Christopher Mbilo	Tanzania	22.09	
5	Padmakumar Amarasekera	Sri Lanka	22.39	
6	Tshokolo Peloethata	Botswana	22.48	
7	Carlos Oliveira	Uruguay	22.83	
	Horace Dove-Edwin	Sierra Leone	DQ	

==== Heat 8 ====
Wind: -0.2 m/s

Rank	Name	Nationality	Time	Notes
1	Jarosław Kaniecki	Poland	21.38	Q
2	Abdullah Tetengi	Nigeria	21.57	Q
3	Mark Johnson	Bahamas	21.75	q
4	Milan Petaković	Yugoslavia	22.02	
5	Carlos Moreno	Chile	22.32	
6	Aceng Rumaedi	Indonesia	22.66	

==== Heat 9 ====
Wind: -1.3 m/s

Rank	Name	Nationality	Time	Notes
1	Frank Kobor	West Germany	21.36	Q
2	Masahiro Nagura	Japan	21.53	Q
3	Alvin Daniel	Trinidad and Tobago	21.94	q
4	Indra Nugraha	Indonesia	22.42	
5	Khayar Seck	Senegal	22.66	
6	Henri Ngamotendi	Congo	23.10	

==== Heat 10 ====
Wind: +0.6 m/s

Rank	Name	Nationality	Time	Notes
1	Pel van de Kerkhof	Netherlands	21.82	Q
2	Eduardo Nava	Mexico	21.97	Q
3	Dazel Jules	Trinidad and Tobago	22.17	
4	Pedro Pérez	Puerto Rico	22.30	
5	Washington Rodrigues	Brazil	22.78	
6	Eversley Linley	Saint Vincent and the Grenadines	22.99	
7	M.Adam Salih	Sudan	23.16	
8	Michel Bibi	Seychelles	23.32	

==== Heat 11 ====
Wind: -0.1 m/s

Rank	Name	Nationality	Time	Notes
1	Steve McBain	Australia	21.32	Q
2	Ivo Rýznar	Czechoslovakia	21.64	Q
3	Yaya Adesina	Nigeria	21.82	q
4	Ioannis Zisimides	Cyprus	22.08	
5	Hoon Kim Seng	Singapore	22.28	
6	Yehuda Moreli	Israel	22.34	
7	Tamás Molnár	Hungary	22.45	
8	Ahmed Hassan Rawiah	North Yemen	23.71	

== Participation ==
According to an unofficial count, 80 athletes from 62 countries participated in the event.

- Angola (1)
- Antigua and Barbuda (1)
- Australia (2)
- Bahamas (2)
- Bermuda (1)
- Botswana (1)
- Brazil (1)
- Bulgaria (2)
- Cameroon (1)
- Canada (2)
- Chile (1)
- Congo (1)
- Cook Islands (1)
- Cuba (2)
- Cyprus (1)
- Czechoslovakia (1)
- Egypt (1)
- El Salvador (1)
- Ethiopia (1)
- Fiji (1)
- Greece (1)
- Hong Kong (1)
- Hungary (1)
- Indonesia (2)
- Israel (2)
- Italy (1)
- Japan (2)
- Lebanon (1)
- Liberia (1)
- Madagascar (2)
- Malta (1)
- Mexico (1)
- Montserrat (1)
- Morocco (1)
- Netherlands (1)
- New Zealand (1)
- Nigeria (2)
- North Yemen (1)
- Papua New Guinea (1)
- Poland (2)
- Puerto Rico (1)
- Saint Vincent and the Grenadines (1)
- Saudi Arabia (2)
- Senegal (1)
- Seychelles (1)
- Sierra Leone (1)
- Singapore (1)
- South Korea (1)
- South Yemen (1)
- Soviet Union (2)
- Spain (2)
- Sri Lanka (1)
- Sudan (1)
- Sweden (2)
- Tanzania (1)
- Trinidad and Tobago (2)
- United Kingdom (1)
- United States (2)
- Uruguay (1)
- Vanuatu (1)
- West Germany (2)
- Yugoslavia (1)
