= 1986 World Junior Championships in Athletics – Men's 4 × 100 metres relay =

The men's 4×100 metres relay event at the 1986 World Junior Championships in Athletics was held in Athens, Greece, at Olympic Stadium on 19 and 20 July.

== Medalists ==
| Gold | Jamie Henderson; Phil Goedluck; David Kirton; Jon Ridgeon; United Kingdom |
| Silver | Matthias Schlicht; Frank Kobor; Oliver Schmidt; Ingo Todt; West Germany |
| Bronze | Jarosław Kaniecki; Tomasz Jędrusik; Jacek Konopka; Marek Parjaszewski; Poland |

== Results ==
=== Final ===
20 July

| Rank | Nation | Competitors | Time | Notes |
|---|---|---|---|---|
| 1st place, gold medalist(s) | United Kingdom | Jamie Henderson; Phil Goedluck; David Kirton; Jon Ridgeon | 39.80 | |
| 2nd place, silver medalist(s) | West Germany | Matthias Schlicht; Frank Kobor; Oliver Schmidt; Ingo Todt | 39.81 | |
| 3rd place, bronze medalist(s) | Poland | Jarosław Kaniecki; Tomasz Jędrusik; Jacek Konopka; Marek Parjaszewski | 39.98 | |
| 4 | Cuba | Joel Isasi; Emilio Valle; Ramiro González; Roberto Martínez | 40.30 | |
| 5 | France | Marcel Laude; Pascal Théophile; Olivier Théophile; Bernard Chatam | 40.31 | |
| 6 | Bahamas | Mark Johnson; Michael Newbold; Glendale Miller; Garland Miller | 40.46 | |
| | United States | Michael Marsh; Derrick Florence; William Reed; Stanley Kerr | DQ | |
| | Jamaica | Ralston Wright; Garfield Campbell; Lyndale Patterson; Howard Davis | DNF | |

=== Heats ===
19 July

==== Heat 1 ====
| Rank | Nation | Competitors | Time | Notes |
|---|---|---|---|---|
| 1 | West Germany | Matthias Schlicht; Frank Kobor; Oliver Schmidt; Ingo Todt | 40.16 | Q |
| 2 | Jamaica | Garfield Campbell; Carey Johnson; Ralston Wright; Howard Davis | 40.47 | Q |
| 3 | Bulgaria | Sacho Tinkovski; Krasimir Bozhinovski; Gencho Genev; Nikolay Antonov | 40.56 | |
| 4 | Spain | Augusto Llanos; Sergio López; Diego Gómez; Enrique Talavera | 40.72 | |
| 5 | Greece | Yeóryios Kiriakídis; Konstadínos Labrópoulos; Theotókis Flemotómos; Konstadínos Bouloúkos | 41.10 | |
| 6 | United Arab Emirates | Hassan Salem; Abdallah Sarwash; Tarek Khamis Dabouss; Mohamed Ali Moubarak | 45.20 | |
| | Cyprus | Petros Pangalos; Tasos Iakovidis; Aris Georgiadis; Ioannis Zisimides | DQ | |
| | Soviet Union | Aleksandr Kutepov; Romans Osipenko; Dmitriy Bartenyev; Sergey Klyonov | DQ | |

==== Heat 2 ====
| Rank | Nation | Competitors | Time | Notes |
|---|---|---|---|---|
| 1 | United States | Michael Marsh; Derrick Florence; William Reed; Stanley Kerr | 39.53 | Q |
| 2 | France | Marcel Laude; Pascal Théophile; Olivier Théophile; Bernard Chatam | 40.19 | Q |
| 3 | Cuba | Joel Isasi; Emilio Valle; Ramiro González; Roberto Martínez | 40.21 | q |
| 4 | Bahamas | Mark Johnson; Michael Newbold; Glendale Miller; Garland Miller | 40.34 | q |
| 5 | Nigeria | Yaya Adesina; Abdullah Tetengi; Soyi Ikhide; Lawrence Arekhandia | 40.99 | |
| 6 | Thailand | Rapee Thontawee; Pongsak Wacharakupt; Anuwat Sermsiri; Sakol Boukom | 41.05 | |
| 7 | Sweden | Martin Körling; Aleksandar Vujovic; Lars Hedner; Ronnie Sköld | 41.08 | |

==== Heat 3 ====
| Rank | Nation | Competitors | Time | Notes |
|---|---|---|---|---|
| 1 | Poland | Jarosław Kaniecki; Tomasz Jędrusik; Jacek Konopka; Marek Parjaszewski | 39.93 | Q |
| 2 | United Kingdom | Jamie Henderson; Phil Goedluck; David Kirton; Jon Ridgeon | 40.14 | Q |
| 3 | Canada | Brad McCuaig; Desmond Griffiths; Ken LeBlanc; Carl Folkes | 40.43 | |
| 4 | Australia | Steve McBain; David Culbert; Mark Garner; David Dworjanyn | 40.56 | |
| 5 | Italy | Arcangelo Mariano; Daniele Ruggieri; Michele Lazazzera; Alberto Martilli | 41.00 | |
| 6 | Japan | Yoshimi Hirota; Koichi Igarashi; Keiichi Adachi; Masahiro Nagura | 41.10 | |
| 7 | Indonesia | Indra Nugraha; Aceng Rumaedi; Serry Goin; Mohamed Fachri | 42.01 | |
| 8 | Saudi Arabia | Mohamed Bakr Al-Housaoui; Yasser Abdulrahman Fallatah Kadhy; Zaki Sharaf; Mohamed Al-Bishi | 42.28 | |

== Participation ==
According to an unofficial count, 93 athletes from 23 countries participated in the event.

- Australia (4)
- Bahamas (4)
- Bulgaria (4)
- Canada (4)
- Cuba (4)
- Cyprus (4)
- France (4)
- Greece (4)
- Indonesia (4)
- Italy (4)
- Jamaica (5)
- Japan (4)
- Nigeria (4)
- Poland (4)
- Saudi Arabia (4)
- Soviet Union (4)
- Spain (4)
- Sweden (4)
- Thailand (4)
- United Arab Emirates (4)
- United Kingdom (4)
- United States (4)
- West Germany (4)
