= Athletics at the 1989 Summer Universiade – Men's 4 × 100 metres relay =

The men's 4 × 100 metres relay event at the 1989 Summer Universiade was held at the Wedaustadion in Duisburg with the final on 29 and 30 August 1989.

== Results ==
=== Heats ===
Rank	Heat	Nation	Athletes	Time	Notes
1	2	United States	Slip Watkins, Tony Dees, Andre Cason, Michael Marsh	38.86	Q
2	1	Soviet Union	Andrey Razin, Dmitriy Vanyaykin, Andrey Fedoriv, Igor Groshev	39.60	Q
3	1	France	Pierre Boutry, Francis Darlis, Laurent Leconte, Jean-Charles Trouabal	39.79	Q
4	2	Jamaica	Patrick O'Connor, Howard Davis, Devon Morris, Howard Burnett	40.23	Q
5	2	Great Britain	Jamie Henderson, Andy Carrott, Nigel Will, Philip Harries	40.27	Q
6	1	Senegal	Babacar Pouyé, Lamine Samatey, Eric Lopez, Amadou M'Baye	40.28	Q
7	1	Spain	Florencio Gascón, José Bernardo Muñoz, Valentín Rocandio, Sergio López	40.50	q
8	2	Chinese Taipei	Cheng Hsin-fu, Tsai Yi-chen, Hsieh Tzong-tze, Lin Jin-Hsiung	40.70	q
9	2	Hungary	Dávid Somfay, István Juhász, György Fetter, Endre Hava	41.43	
10	1	Hong Kong	Cheung Shiu Sun, Lam Wai Keung, Chan Sai Keung, Hau Yiu Chung	44.01	
	1	Italy	Andrea Mancini, Giovanni Puggioni, Domenico Gorla, Marcello Pantone	DNF	
	2	West Germany	Wolfgang Zinser, Volker Westhagemann, Christian Thomas, Andreas Maul	DNF	
	2	Japan	Shinji Aoto, Tatsuo Sugimoto, Yoshiyuki Okuyama, Takayuki Nakamichi	DQ	
	2	Vietnam	Zuong Duc Thuy, Nguyen Phuong, Hoang Cu, Tran Duy Kham	DQ	

=== Final ===
Rank	Nation	Athletes	Time	Notes
1st place, gold medalist(s)	United States	Slip Watkins, Tony Dees, Andre Cason, Michael Marsh	38.58	
2nd place, silver medalist(s)	Soviet Union	Andrey Razin, Dmitriy Vanyaykin, Andrey Fedoriv, Igor Groshev	39.35	
3rd place, bronze medalist(s)	France	Pierre Boutry, Francis Darlis, Laurent Leconte, Jean-Charles Trouabal	39.67	
4	Jamaica	Patrick O'Connor, Howard Davis, Devon Morris, Richard Bucknor	39.86	
5	Spain	Florencio Gascón, José Bernardo Muñoz, Valentín Rocandio, Sergio López	39.98	
6	Great Britain	Jamie Henderson, Andy Carrott, Nigel Will, Philip Harries	40.06	
7	Senegal	Babacar Pouyé, Lamine Samatey, Eric Lopez, Amadou M'Baye	40.75	
8	Chinese Taipei	Cheng Hsin-fu, Tsai Yi-chen, Chang Yu-chang, Nai Hui-fang	40.75	
