= 1989 IAAF World Indoor Championships – Men's 200 metres =

The men's 200 metres event at the 1989 IAAF World Indoor Championships was held at the Budapest Sportcsarnok in Budapest on 3 March.

== Medalists ==
| Gold | Silver | Bronze |
|---|---|---|
| John Regis; Great Britain | Ade Mafe; Great Britain | Kevin Little; United States |

== Results ==
=== Heats ===
The first 2 of each heat (Q) and next 4 fastest (q) qualified for the semifinals.

| Rank | Heat | Name | Nationality | Time | Notes |
|---|---|---|---|---|---|
| 1 | 2 | John Regis | Great Britain | 21.17 | Q |
| 2 | 4 | Kevin Little | United States | 21.22 | Q |
| 3 | 1 | Robson da Silva | Brazil | 21.25 | Q |
| 4 | 4 | Rob van de Klundert | Netherlands | 21.27 | Q, NR |
| 5 | 4 | Sandro Floris | Italy | 21.34 | q |
| 6 | 2 | Andrzej Popa | Poland | 21.35 | Q |
| 7 | 1 | Nikolay Antonov | Bulgaria | 21.42 | Q |
| 8 | 2 | Paolo Catalano | Italy | 21.48 | q |
| 9 | 3 | Ade Mafe | Great Britain | 21.49 | Q |
| 10 | 3 | László Karaffa | Hungary | 21.57 | Q |
| 11 | 4 | Bruno Marie-Rose | France | 21.68 | q |
| 12 | 1 | Alemayehu Gudeta | Ethiopia | 21.90 | q, NR |
| 13 | 3 | Luís Cunha | Portugal | 21.93 | |
| 14 | 1 | Troy Douglas | Bermuda | 21.94 | NR |
| 15 | 3 | Emmanuel Tuffour | Ghana | 22.09 | |
| 16 | 2 | Ian Morris | Trinidad and Tobago | 22.19 | |
| 17 | 1 | Ayhan Bodur | Turkey | 22.47 | |
| 18 | 3 | Trevor Davis | Anguilla | 22.90 | |
| 19 | 1 | Clinton Bufuku | Zambia | 23.25 | NR |
| | 2 | Itai Iluz | Israel | DQ | |

=== Semifinals ===
First 3 of each semifinal (Q) qualified directly for the final.

| Rank | Heat | Name | Nationality | Time | Notes |
|---|---|---|---|---|---|
| 1 | 1 | John Regis | Great Britain | 20.81 | Q |
| 2 | 2 | Robson da Silva | Brazil | 20.86 | Q |
| 3 | 2 | Ade Mafe | Great Britain | 21.01 | Q |
| 4 | 2 | Kevin Little | United States | 21.05 | Q |
| 5 | 1 | Sandro Floris | Italy | 21.21 | Q |
| 6 | 1 | Rob van de Klundert | Netherlands | 21.36 | Q |
| 7 | 2 | Andrzej Popa | Poland | 21.43 | |
| 8 | 1 | Nikolay Antonov | Bulgaria | 21.47 | |
| 9 | 1 | László Karaffa | Hungary | 21.51 | |
| 10 | 2 | Paolo Catalano | Italy | 21.90 | |
| 11 | 2 | Alemayehu Gudeta | Ethiopia | 21.90 | =NR |
| | 1 | Bruno Marie-Rose | France | DNS | |

=== Final ===
| Rank | Lane | Name | Nationality | Time | Notes |
|---|---|---|---|---|---|
| 1st place, gold medalist(s) | 4 | John Regis | Great Britain | 20.54 | CR |
| 2nd place, silver medalist(s) | 6 | Ade Mafe | Great Britain | 20.87 | |
| 3rd place, bronze medalist(s) | 2 | Kevin Little | United States | 21.12 | |
| 4 | 3 | Sandro Floris | Italy | 21.31 | |
| 5 | 1 | Rob van de Klundert | Netherlands | 21.55 | |
| | 5 | Robson da Silva | Brazil | DQ | |
