= Athletics at the 1988 Summer Olympics – Men's 100 metres =

Men's 100 meters at the Games of the XXIV Olympiad
- Venue: Olympic Stadium
- Date: 23 & 24 September
- Competitors: 102 from 69 nations
- Winning time: 9.92 WR

Medalists
1st place, gold medalist(s)		Carl Lewis; United States
2nd place, silver medalist(s)		Linford Christie; Great Britain
3rd place, bronze medalist(s)		Calvin Smith; United States

The men's 100 meters at the 1988 Summer Olympics in Seoul, South Korea saw world champion Ben Johnson of Canada defeat defending Olympic champion Carl Lewis of the United States in a world record time of 9.79, breaking his own record of 9.83 that he had set at the 1987 World Championships in Rome. Two days later, Johnson was stripped of his gold medal and world record by the International Olympic Committee (IOC) after he tested positive for stanozolol. The gold medal was then awarded to the original silver medalist Lewis, who had run 9.92. On 30 September 1989, following Johnson's admission to steroid use between 1981 and 1988, the IAAF rescinded his world record of 9.83 from the 1987 World Championship Final and stripped Johnson of his World Championship gold medal, which was also awarded to Lewis, who initially finished second. This made Lewis the first man to repeat as Olympic champion in the 100 metres (second, if Archie Hahn's 1906 Intercalated Games title is recognized).

Lewis's 9.92 from the Olympic final was also recognized as the official world record, breaking the 9.93 mark that Calvin Smith had set in 1983 and Lewis had since equalled twice. Smith also participated in this race and originally finished fourth, but was elevated to third place and awarded the bronze medal, and Linford Christie of the United Kingdom, who originally won the bronze medal, was elevated to silver. It would take eleven years for an athlete to run a "clean" 9.79 in the 100 meters, which was accomplished by Maurice Greene in Athens, Greece in 1999.

The other participants in this race, in order of finish, were Dennis Mitchell of the United States, who would go on to win the bronze medal in this event in Barcelona; Robson da Silva of Brazil, who won bronze in the 200 meters in Seoul; Johnson's teammate Desai Williams, a bronze medalist in the 4 × 100 meter relay in Los Angeles four years earlier; and Ray Stewart of Jamaica, who won a silver medal in the same relay at the Los Angeles Olympics.

102 competitors from 69 countries competed. Each nation was limited to three athletes under the rules laid down at the 1930 Olympic Congress.

== Aftermath ==
Johnson was not the only participant whose success was questioned: Lewis had tested positive at the Olympic Trials for pseudoephedrine, ephedrine and phenylpropanolamine. Lewis defended himself, claiming that he had accidentally consumed the banned substances. After the supplements that he had taken were analyzed to prove his claims, the USOC accepted his claim of inadvertent use, since a dietary supplement he ingested was found to contain "Ma huang", the Chinese name for Ephedra (ephedrine is known to help weight loss). Fellow Santa Monica Track Club teammates Joe DeLoach and Floyd Heard were also found to have the same banned stimulants in their systems, and were cleared to compete for the same reason.

The highest level of the stimulants Lewis recorded was 6 ppm, which was regarded as a positive test in 1988 but is now regarded as negative test. The acceptable level has been raised to ten parts per million for ephedrine and twenty-five parts per million for other substances. According to the IOC rules at the time, positive tests with levels lower than 10 ppm were cause of further investigation but not immediate ban. Neal Benowitz, a professor of medicine at UC San Francisco who is an expert on ephedrine and other stimulants, agreed that "These [levels] are what you'd see from someone taking cold or allergy medicines and are unlikely to have any effect on performance."

Christie was found to have metabolites of pseudoephedrine in his urine after a 200 m heat at the same Olympics, but was later cleared of any wrongdoing. Of the top five competitors in the race, only former world record holder and eventual bronze medalist Smith never failed a drug test during his career. Smith later said: "I should have been the gold medalist."

The CBC radio documentary, Rewind, "Ben Johnson: A Hero Disgraced" broadcast on September 19, 2013, for the 25th anniversary of the race, stated 20 athletes tested positive for drugs but were cleared by the IOC at this 1988 Seoul Olympics. An IOC official stated that endocrine profiles done at those games indicated that 80 percent of the track and field athletes tested showed evidence of long-term steroid use, although not all were banned.

== Background ==
This was the twenty-first time the event was held, having appeared at every Olympics since the first in 1896. For the first time, the number of competitors topped 100.

Algeria, Bahrain, Burkina Faso, Hong Kong, the Maldives, Papua New Guinea, San Marino, Togo, Tonga, Vanuatu, South Yemen, and Zimbabwe appeared in the event for the first time. It was also the first appearance of "Chinese Taipei," though the Republic of China had competed before. The United States made its 20th appearance in the event, the most of any country, having missed only the boycotted 1980 Games.

== Competition format ==
The event retained the same basic four round format introduced in 1920: heats, quarterfinals, semifinals, and a final. The "fastest loser" system, introduced in 1968, was used again to ensure that the quarterfinals and subsequent rounds had exactly 8 runners per heat; this time, the system was used in both the preliminaries and quarterfinals.

The first round consisted of 13 heats, each with 7 or 8 athletes. The top three runners in each heat advanced, along with the next nine fastest runners overall. This made 48 quarterfinalists, who were divided into 6 heats of 8 runners. The top two runners in each quarterfinal advanced, with four "fastest loser" places. The 16 semifinalists competed in two heats of 8, with the top four in each semifinal advancing to the eight-man final.

== Records ==
These were the then-recognized world and Olympic records (in seconds) prior to the 1988 Summer Olympics.

World record	9.83^{1}	(Canada) Ben Johnson	Rome (ITA)	August 30, 1987
Olympic record	9.95	(United States) Jim Hines	Mexico City (MEX)	October 14, 1968

^{1} This time was rescinded by the IAAF Council in September 1989 after Johnson admitted to using steroids between 1981 and 1988. Not including that time, the world record was 9.93.

The following Olympic records were set during this competition.

Date	Athlete	Time	OR	WR
September 24, 1988	Carl Lewis (USA)	9.92	OR	WR

Following Johnson's disqualification, Carl Lewis's time of 9.92 was recognized as a new Olympic record, and also became a new world record after Johnson's time was rescinded.

== Results ==
=== Heats ===
==== Heat 1 ====
Rank	Athlete	Nation	Time	Notes
1	Robson da Silva	Brazil	10.37	Q
2	Ezio Madonia	Italy	10.40	Q
3	Cheng Hsin-fu	Chinese Taipei	10.48	Q
4	Thierry Lauret	France	10.56	q
5	Boevi Lawson	Togo	10.59	
6	Leung Wing Kwong	Hong Kong	10.82	
7	Mohamed Fahd Al-Bishi	Saudi Arabia	10.85	
8	Jerry Jeremiah	Vanuatu	10.96	
			Wind: +0.6 m/s	

==== Heat 2 ====
Rank	Athlete	Nation	Time	Notes
1	Calvin Smith	United States	10.28	Q
2	Attila Kovács	Hungary	10.39	Q
3	Mardi Lestari	Indonesia	10.40	Q
4	Andrey Razin	Soviet Union	10.58	
5	Henri Ndinga	Republic of the Congo	10.74	
6	Fabian Muyaba	Zimbabwe	10.75	
7	Moustafa Kamel Salmi	Algeria	11.08	
8	Markus Büchel	Liechtenstein	11.21	
			Wind: +0.9 m/s	

==== Heat 3 ====
Rank	Athlete	Nation	Time	Notes
1	Talal Mansour	Qatar	10.42	Q
2	Juan Núñez	Dominican Republic	10.47	Q
3	Amadou M'Baye	Senegal	10.64	Q
4	Fabian Whymns	Bahamas	10.70	
5	Neville Hodge	Virgin Islands	10.73	
6	Horace Dove-Edwin	Sierra Leone	10.89	
7	Alexandre Yougbare	Burkina Faso	10.90	
8	Henrico Atkins	Barbados	11.01	
			Wind: +0.7 m/s	

==== Heat 4 ====
Rank	Athlete	Nation	Time	Notes
1	Emmanuel Tuffour	Ghana	10.31	Q
2	Koji Kurihara	Japan	10.46	Q
3	Andrew Smith	Jamaica	10.49	Q
4	Zheng Chen	China	10.51	q
5	István Tatár	Hungary	10.52	q
6	Christian Haas	West Germany	10.54	q
7	John Hou	Papua New Guinea	10.96	
8	Ehab Fuad Ahmed Nagi	South Yemen	11.53	
			Wind: +0.8 m/s	

==== Heat 5 ====
Rank	Athlete	Nation	Time	Notes
1	Linford Christie	Great Britain	10.19	Q
2	Max Morinière	France	10.34	Q
3	Sven Matthes	East Germany	10.35	Q
4	Li Tao	China	10.47	q
5	Samuel Nchinda-Kaya	Cameroon	10.60	
6	Lee Shiunn-long	Chinese Taipei	10.69	
7	Bill Trott	Bermuda	10.69	
8	Frank Maziya	Swaziland	11.52	
			Wind: +1.1 m/s	

==== Heat 6 ====
Rank	Athlete	Nation	Time	Notes
1	Chidi Imoh	Nigeria	10.62	Q
2	Charles-Louis Seck	Senegal	10.64	Q
3	Issa Alassane-Ousséni	Benin	10.72	Q
4	John Regis	Great Britain	10.76	
5	Mothobi Kharitse	Lesotho	10.97	
6	Robert Loua	Guinea	11.20	
7	Samuel Birch	Liberia	11.68	
—	Pedro Agostinho	Portugal	DNF	
			Wind: +1.4 m/s	

==== Heat 7 ====
Rank	Athlete	Nation	Time	Notes
1	Ray Stewart	Jamaica	10.22	Q
2	Pierfrancesco Pavoni	Italy	10.36	Q
3	Vitaliy Savin	Soviet Union	10.52	Q
4	György Fetter	Hungary	10.54	q
5	Khaled Ibrahim Jouma	Bahrain	10.80	
6	Muhammad Afzal	Pakistan	10.91	
7	Claude Roumain	Haiti	11.22	
			Wind: +1.8 m/s	

==== Heat 8 ====
Rank	Athlete	Nation	Time	Notes
1	Ben Johnson	Canada	10.37	Q
2	Cai Jianming	China	10.55	Q
3	Sim Deok-Seop	South Korea	10.56	Q
4	Carlos Moreno	Chile	10.70	
5	Abdullah Salem Al-Khalidi	Oman	10.90	
6	Mohamed Shah Jalal	Bangladesh	10.94	
7	Joseph Ssali	Uganda	10.95	
8	St. Clair Soleyne	Antigua and Barbuda	11.17	
			Wind: +2.0 m/s	

==== Heat 9 ====
Rank	Athlete	Nation	Time	Notes
1	Desai Williams	Canada	10.24	Q
2	Peter Wekesa	Kenya	10.50	Q
3	Olapade Adeniken	Nigeria	10.56	Q
4	Eduardo Nava	Mexico	10.68	
5	Jailto Bonfim	Brazil	10.75	
6	Lindel Hodge	British Virgin Islands	10.79	
7	Visut Watanasin	Thailand	10.88	
8	Arménio Fernandes	Angola	10.92	
			Wind: +1.0 m/s	

==== Heat 10 ====
Rank	Athlete	Nation	Time	Notes
1	Vladimir Krylov	Soviet Union	10.34	Q
2	Arnaldo da Silva	Brazil	10.44	Q
3	Michele Lazazzera	Italy	10.47	Q
4	Kennedy Ondiek	Kenya	10.51	q
5	Takahiko Kasahara	Japan	10.62	
6	Jimmy Flemming	Virgin Islands	10.70	
7	Jihad Salame	Lebanon	11.49	
8	Gilbert Bessi	Monaco	11.55	
			Wind: +1.4 m/s	

==== Heat 11 ====
Rank	Athlete	Nation	Time	Notes
1	Dennis Mitchell	United States	10.37	Q
2	Isiaq Adeyanju	Nigeria	10.45	Q
3	Ousmane Diarra	Mali	10.53	Q
4	Oliver Daniels	Liberia	10.68	
5	Luís Cunha	Portugal	10.80	
6	Evaristo Ortíz	Dominican Republic	11.01	
7	Nguyễn Đình Minh	Vietnam	11.09	
8	Secundino Borabota	Equatorial Guinea	11.52	
			Wind: +1.0 m/s	

==== Heat 12 ====
Rank	Athlete	Nation	Time	Notes
1	John Myles-Mills	Ghana	10.31	Q
2	Andreas Berger	Austria	10.40	Q
3	Barrington Williams	Great Britain	10.51	Q
4	Patrick Stevens	Belgium	10.51	q
5	Enrique Talavera	Spain	10.61	
6	Tomohiro Osawa	Japan	10.71	
7	Dominique Canti	San Marino	11.11	
8	Ismail Asif Waheed	Maldives	11.49	
			Wind: +1.4 m/s	

==== Heat 13 ====
Rank	Athlete	Nation	Time	Notes
1	Carl Lewis	United States	10.14	Q
2	Jean-Charles Trouabal	France	10.39	Q
3	José Javier Arqués	Spain	10.44	Q
4	John Mair	Jamaica	10.44	
5	Harouna Pale	Burkina Faso	10.76	
6	Peauope Suli	Tonga	10.94	
7	Maloni Bole	Fiji	11.19	
			Wind: +0.9 m/s	

=== Quarterfinals ===
==== Quarterfinal 1 ====
Rank	Athlete	Nation	Time	Notes
1	Linford Christie	Great Britain	10.11	Q
2	Dennis Mitchell	United States	10.13	Q
3	Ben Johnson	Canada	10.17	q
4	John Mair	Jamaica	10.41	
5	Charles-Louis Seck	Senegal	10.42	
6	Li Tao	China	10.53	
7	Kennedy Ondiek	Kenya	10.57	
8	Ousmane Diarra	Mali	10.61	
			Wind: +1.2 m/s	

==== Quarterfinal 2 ====
Rank	Athlete	Nation	Time	Notes
1	Desai Williams	Canada	10.16	Q
2	Arnaldo da Silva	Brazil	10.25	Q
3	Vladimir Krylov	Soviet Union	10.26	q
4	Attila Kovács	Hungary	10.27	q
5	Michele Lazazzera	Italy	10.50	
6	Thierry Lauret	France	10.51	
7	Zheng Chen	China	10.72	
8	Chidi Imoh	Nigeria	11.44	
			Wind: +1.7 m/s	

==== Quarterfinal 3 ====
Rank	Athlete	Nation	Time	Notes
1	Ray Stewart	Jamaica	10.25	Q
2	Juan Núñez	Dominican Republic	10.33	Q
3	Sven Matthes	East Germany	10.36	
4	Jean-Charles Trouabal	France	10.41	
5	José Javier Arqués	Spain	10.43	
6	Amadou M'Baye	Senegal	10.45	
7	Barrington Williams	Great Britain	10.55	
8	Christian Haas	West Germany	10.57	
			Wind: +0.9 m/s	

==== Quarterfinal 4 ====
Rank	Athlete	Nation	Time	Notes
1	Calvin Smith	United States	10.16	Q
2	Olapade Adeniken	Nigeria	10.30	Q
3	Andreas Berger	Austria	10.34	
4	Emmanuel Tuffour	Ghana	10.37	
5	Talal Mansour	Qatar	10.38	
6	Patrick Stevens	Belgium	10.50	
7	Cheng Hsin-Fu	Chinese Taipei	10.54	
8	György Fetter	Hungary	10.55	
			Wind: +0.2 m/s	

==== Quarterfinal 5 ====
Rank	Athlete	Nation	Time	Notes
1	Carl Lewis	United States	9.99	Q
2	Robson da Silva	Brazil	10.24	Q
3	Isiaq Adeyanju	Nigeria	10.32	q
4	Pierfrancesco Pavoni	Italy	10.33	
5	Vitaliy Savin	Soviet Union	10.36	
6	Koji Kurihara	Japan	10.49	
7	István Tatár	Hungary	10.68	
8	Issa Alassane-Ousséni	Benin	10.83	
			Wind: +1.4 m/s	

==== Quarterfinal 6 ====
Rank	Athlete	Nation	Time	Notes
1	John Myles-Mills	Ghana	10.21	Q
2	Mardi Lestari	Indonesia	10.32	Q
3	Max Morinière	France	10.37	
4	Ezio Madonia	Italy	10.38	
5	Peter Wekesa	Kenya	10.43	
6	Sim Deok-Seop	South Korea	10.55	
7	Andrew Smith	Jamaica	10.63	
8	Cai Jianming	China	10.76	
			Wind: +0.3 m/s	

=== Semifinals ===
==== Semifinal 1 ====
Rank	Athlete	Nation	Time	Notes
1	Carl Lewis	United States	9.97	Q
2	Calvin Smith	United States	10.15	Q
3	Ray Stewart	Jamaica	10.18	Q
4	Desai Williams	Canada	10.24	Q
5	Arnaldo da Silva	Brazil	10.32	
6	Olapade Adeniken	Nigeria	10.33	
7	Mardi Lestari	Indonesia	10.39	
8	John Myles-Mills	Ghana	10.43	
			Wind: +0.6 m/s	

==== Semifinal 2 ====
Rank	Athlete	Nation	Time	Notes
1	Ben Johnson	Canada	10.03	Q
2	Linford Christie	Great Britain	10.11	Q
3	Dennis Mitchell	United States	10.23	Q
4	Robson da Silva	Brazil	10.24	Q
5	Attila Kovács	Hungary	10.31	
6	Juan Núñez	Dominican Republic	10.35	
7	Isiaq Adeyanju	Nigeria	10.60	
–	Vladimir Krylov	Soviet Union	DNS	
			Wind: -1.2 m/s	

=== Final ===
Rank	Athlete	Nation	Time	Notes
1st place, gold medalist(s)	Carl Lewis	United States	9.92	WR
2nd place, silver medalist(s)	Linford Christie	Great Britain	9.97	NR
3rd place, bronze medalist(s)	Calvin Smith	United States	9.99	
4	Dennis Mitchell	United States	10.04	
5	Robson da Silva	Brazil	10.11	
6	Desai Williams	Canada	10.11	
7	Ray Stewart	Jamaica	12.26	
DQ	Ben Johnson	Canada	~~9.79~~	
			Wind: +1.1 m/s	

== See also ==
- Women's 100 metres
