= Maziya (disambiguation) =

Maziya may refer to:

== People ==
- Ali Maziya (1950–2018), South African politician
- Frank Maziya (born 1961), Swazi sprinter
- Lwazi Maziya (born 1983), Swazi footballer

== Other uses ==
- Maziya S&RC, Maldivian professional football club
- Maziya Priyala Preet Kalena, soap opera
