= Chris Wagner (disambiguation) =

Chris Wagner (born 1991) is an American ice hockey player.

Chris Wagner may also refer to:

- Chris Wagner (fl. 2000s), American musician and member of The Latch Brothers
- Chris Wagner (fl. 1990s), Canadian athlete who competed at the 1994 World Junior Championships in Athletics – Men's 400 metres hurdles
- Chris Wagner (fl. 1960s–1980s), editor of the magazine Strategy & Tactics

== See also ==
- Chris Waegner (fl. 2020s), American visual effects artist
