= Lars Hedner =

Swedish sprinter

Personal information
- Born: 27 May 1967 (age 59) Linköping, Sweden
- Height: 1.88 m (6 ft 2 in)
- Weight: 78 kg (172 lb)

Sport
- Sport: Track and field
- Events: 100 m, 200 m
- Club: Malmö AI

Lars Evert Patrik Hedner (born 27 May 1967 in Linköping) is a retired Swedish athlete who competed in sprinting events. He represented his country at the 1996 Summer Olympics, as well as three outdoor and one indoor World Championships.

== Competition record ==
Year	Competition	Venue	Position	Event	Notes
Representing Sweden
1985	European Junior Championships	Cottbus, East Germany	21st (h)	100 m	10.99
1985	European Junior Championships	Cottbus, East Germany	9th (h)	4 × 100 m relay	40.92
1986	World Junior Championships	Athens, Greece	14th (sf)	200 m	21.62
1986	World Junior Championships	Athens, Greece	16th (h)	4 × 100 m relay	41.08
1993	World Championships	Stuttgart, Germany	8th (sf)	4 × 100 m relay	38.96
1994	European Championships	Helsinki, Finland	9th (sf)	200 m	20.91
1994	European Championships	Helsinki, Finland	4th	4 × 100 m relay	39.05
1995	World Indoor Championships	Barcelona, Spain	17th (sf)	60 m	6.70
1995	World Championships	Gothenburg, Sweden	29th (qf)	100 m	10.41
1995	World Championships	Gothenburg, Sweden	25th (qf)	200 m	20.87
1995	World Championships	Gothenburg, Sweden	9th (sf)	4 × 100 m relay	38.78
1996	Olympic Games	Atlanta, United States	49th (h)	200 m	20.97
1996	Olympic Games	Atlanta, United States	5th	4 × 100 m relay	38.67
1997	World Championships	Athens, Greece	50th (h)	200 m	21.30

== Personal bests ==
Outdoor

- 100 metres – 10.34 (Gothenburg 1994)
- 200 metres – 20.61 (Sollentuna 1995)

Indoor

- 60 metres – 6.65 (Malmö 1995)
