= 1989 European Athletics Indoor Championships – Men's 200 metres =

The men's 200 metres event at the 1989 European Athletics Indoor Championships was held on 18 and 19 February.

== Medalists ==
Gold	Silver	Bronze
Ade Mafe; Great Britain	John Regis; Great Britain	Bruno Marie-Rose; France

== Results ==
=== Heats ===
First 3 from each heat (Q) and the next 3 fastest (q) qualified for the semifinals.

Rank	Heat	Name	Nationality	Time	Notes
1	3	Andreas Berger	Austria	20.92	Q
2	3	Ade Mafe	Great Britain	21.09	Q
3	1	Bruno Marie-Rose	France	21.15	Q
4	2	Tomasz Jędrusik	Poland	21.19	Q
5	1	John Regis	Great Britain	21.20	Q
6	1	René Mangold	Switzerland	21.30	Q
7	1	Rob van de Klundert	Netherlands	21.35	q
8	2	Arnaldo Abrantes	Portugal	21.49	Q
9	2	Luís Cunha	Portugal	21.50	Q
10	1	Andrzej Popa	Poland	21.51	q
11	1	Nikolay Razgonov	Soviet Union	21.53	q
12	2	Paolo Catalano	Italy	21.54	
13	3	Sandro Floris	Italy	21.61	Q
14	2	Gilles Quénéhervé	France	21.69	
15	3	Alain Mazzella	France	21.82	
16	3	Geir Moen	Norway	22.25	
	3	Nikolay Antonov	Bulgaria	DQ	

=== Semifinals ===
First 2 from each semifinal (Q) and the nest 2 fastest (q) qualified for the final.

Rank	Heat	Name	Nationality	Time	Notes
1	1	Sandro Floris	Italy	21.07	Q
2	1	John Regis	Great Britain	21.08	Q
3	2	Ade Mafe	Great Britain	21.14	Q
4	1	Andreas Berger	Austria	21.22	q
4	2	Bruno Marie-Rose	France	21.22	Q
6	2	Andrzej Popa	Poland	21.26	q
7	1	Tomasz Jędrusik	Poland	21.27	
8	2	René Mangold	Switzerland	21.41	
9	1	Nikolay Razgonov	Soviet Union	21.59	
10	2	Rob van de Klundert	Netherlands	22.01	
11	2	Arnaldo Abrantes	Portugal	22.10	
12	1	Luís Cunha	Portugal	22.18	

=== Final ===
Rank	Lane	Name	Nationality	Time	Notes
1st place, gold medalist(s)	5	Ade Mafe	Great Britain	20.92	
2nd place, silver medalist(s)	3	John Regis	Great Britain	21.00	
3rd place, bronze medalist(s)	6	Bruno Marie-Rose	France	21.14	
4	2	Andreas Berger	Austria	21.33	
5	4	Sandro Floris	Italy	21.41	
6	1	Andrzej Popa	Poland	21.81	
