= Enrique Talavera =

Spanish sprinter

Personal information
- Full name: Enrique Talavera Rubio
- Born: 15 January 1967 (age 59) Algeciras, Spain
- Height: 1.83 m (6 ft 0 in)
- Weight: 75 kg (165 lb)

Sport
- Sport: Athletics
- Events: 100 m, 200 m

Enrique Talavera Rubio (born 15 January 1967 in Algeciras) is a retired Spanish athlete who competed in sprinting events. He represented his country at the 1988 and 1992 Summer Olympics, as well as three consecutive World Championships.

== International competitions ==
Year	Competition	Venue	Position	Event	Notes
Representing Spain
1986	World Junior Championships	Athens, Greece	36th (h)	100 m	10.91
1986	World Junior Championships	Athens, Greece	12th (h)	4 × 100 m relay	40.72
1987	World Championships	Rome, Italy	16th (h)	4 × 100 m relay	40.20
1987	Mediterranean Games	Latakia, Syria	5th	100 m	10.73
1988	Ibero-American Championships	Mexico City, Mexico	6th	100 m	10.35
1988	Ibero-American Championships	Mexico City, Mexico	2nd	4 × 100 m relay	39.36
1988	Olympic Games	Seoul, South Korea	48th (h)	100 m	10.61
1988	Olympic Games	Seoul, South Korea	–	4 × 100 m relay	DNF
1989	World Cup	Barcelona, Spain	9th	4 × 100 m relay	39.69
1990	European Indoor Championships	Glasgow, United Kingdom	7th (sf)	60 m	6.70
1990	European Championships	Split, Yugoslavia	10th (sf)	100 m	10.42
1990	European Championships	Split, Yugoslavia	15th (sf)	200 m	21.31
1990	European Championships	Split, Yugoslavia	6th	4 × 100 m relay	39.10
1990	Ibero-American Championships	Manaus, Brazil	3rd	100 m	10.45
1990	Ibero-American Championships	Manaus, Brazil	2nd	4 × 100 m relay	40.49
1991	World Championships	Tokyo, Japan	28th (qf)	200 m	21.12
1991	World Championships	Tokyo, Japan	12th (h)	4 × 100 m relay	39.52
1991	Mediterranean Games	Athens, Greece	4th (h)	200 m	21.46
1991	Mediterranean Games	Athens, Greece	2nd	4 × 100 m relay	39.39
1992	Ibero-American Championships	Seville, Spain	7th (h)	200 m	21.55^{1}
1992	Ibero-American Championships	Seville, Spain	2nd	4 × 100 m relay	39.44
1992	Olympic Games	Barcelona, Spain	11th (sf)	4 × 100 m relay	39.62
1993	World Championships	Stuttgart, Germany	34th (h)	100 m	10.58
1993	World Championships	Stuttgart, Germany	12th (h)	4 × 100 m relay	39.17

^{1}Competed as a guest

== Personal bests ==
Outdoor

- 100 metres – 10.23 (+0.7 m/s, Mexico City 1988)
- 200 metres – 20.79 (+1.4 m/s, Andújar 1990)

Indoor

- 60 metres – 6.69 (Glasgow 1990)
