= Athletics at the 1995 Pan American Games – Men's 100 metres =

Men's 100 metres at the Pan American Games

The men's 100 metres event at the 1995 Pan American Games was held at the Estadio Atletico "Justo Roman" on 17 and 18 March.

== Medalists ==
| Gold | Silver | Bronze |
|---|---|---|
| Glenroy Gilbert; Canada | Joel Isasi; Cuba | André da Silva; Brazil |

== Results ==
=== Heats ===
Wind:
Heat 1: +2.8 m/s, Heat 2: +3.1 m/s, Heat 3: +2.9 m/s

| Rank | Heat | Name | Nationality | Time | Notes |
|---|---|---|---|---|---|
| 1 | 2 | Vincent Henderson | United States | 10.04 | Q |
| 2 | 1 | Andre Domingos da Silva | Brazil | 10.10 | Q |
| 3 | 2 | Arnaldo de Oliveira Silva | Brazil | 10.16 | Q |
| 4 | 2 | Leonardo Prevost | Cuba | 10.18 | q |
| 5 | 1 | Glenroy Gilbert | Canada | 10.21 | Q |
| 6 | 3 | Joel Isasi | Cuba | 10.24 | Q |
| 7 | 2 | Jaime Barragán | Mexico | 10.30 | q |
| 8 | 2 | Ali Stubbs | Bahamas | 10.31 | |
| 9 | 1 | Dino Napier | United States | 10.36 | |
| 9 | 3 | Carlos Gats | Argentina | 10.36 | Q |
| 11 | 1 | Windell Dobson | Jamaica | 10.38 | |
| 12 | 3 | O'Brian Gibbons | Canada | 10.42 | |
| 13 | 3 | Iram Lewis | Bahamas | 10.44 | |
| 14 | 1 | Jorge Polanco | Argentina | 10.49 | |
| 14 | 3 | Clive Wright | Jamaica | 10.49 | |
| 16 | 3 | Keith Smith | United States Virgin Islands | 10.62 | |
| 17 | 1 | Kim Collins | Saint Kitts and Nevis | 10.85 | |
| 18 | 2 | Warren Thompson | Saint Kitts and Nevis | 10.95 | |
| 19 | 3 | Patrick Delice | Trinidad and Tobago | 11.04 | |

=== Final ===
Wind: +3.4 m/s

| Rank | Name | Nationality | Time | Notes |
|---|---|---|---|---|
| 1st place, gold medalist(s) | Glenroy Gilbert | Canada | 10.21 | |
| 2nd place, silver medalist(s) | Joel Isasi | Cuba | 10.23 | |
| 3rd place, bronze medalist(s) | André da Silva | Brazil | 10.23 | |
| 4 | Vincent Henderson | United States | 10.25 | |
| 5 | Leonardo Prevost | Cuba | 10.36 | |
| 6 | Arnaldo Silva | Brazil | 10.44 | |
| 7 | Carlos Gats | Argentina | 10.44 | |
| 8 | Jaime Barragán | Mexico | 10.57 | |
