= Evaristo Ortíz =

Dominican Republic sprinter

Personal information
- Nationality: Dominican
- Born: 27 December 1960 (age 65)

Sport
- Sport: Sprinting
- Event: 100 metres

Evaristo Ortíz (born 27 December 1960) is a Dominican Republic sprinter. He competed in the men's 100 metres at the 1988 Summer Olympics.
