= Sandro Floris =

Italian sprinter

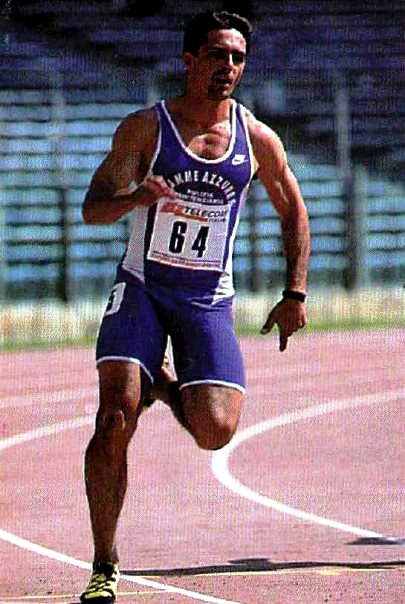

Personal information
- National team: Italy
- Born: 12 June 1965 (age 61) Cagliari, Italy
- Height: 1.78 m (5 ft 10 in)
- Weight: 73 kg (161 lb)

Sport
- Sport: Athletics
- Event: Sprint

Achievements and titles
- Personal bests: 100 m : 10.36 (1994); 200 m: 20.68 (1996)
Medal record
Men's athletics
Representing Italy
Event	1st	2nd	3rd
World Championships	0	0	1
European Championships	0	0	2
Mediterranean Games	3	0	1
European Cup	1	1	1
World Military Games	1	0	0
Total	5	1	5
European Championships
Bronze medal – third place	1990 Split	4×100 m
Bronze medal – third place	1994 Helsinki	4×100 m

Sandro Floris (born 12 June 1965) is a former Italian sprinter who specialized in the 200 metres who won eleven medals at the International athletics competitions, ten of these with national relays team.

At the senior individual level, he was European indoor champion in Glasgow 1990.

== Biography ==
His personal best 200 metres time was 20.68 seconds, achieved in June 1996 in Rome. His personal best for the 100 metres time was 10.36 seconds, achieved in July 1994 in Nuoro.

== Achievements ==
Year	Competition	Venue	Position	Event	Time	Notes
1987	Mediterranean Games	(Syria) Latakia	1st	4 × 100 m relay	39.67	
1988	Olympic Games	(South Korea) Seoul	5th	4 × 100 m relay	38.54	
1989	World Indoor Championships	(Hungary) Budapest	4th	200 m	21.31	(Note: He ran a better crono (21.21) in semifinal.)
1989	European Indoor Championships	(Netherlands) The Hague	5th	200 m	21.41	(Note: He ran a better crono (21.07) in semifinal.)
1990	European Indoor Championships	(United Kingdom) Glasgow	1st	200 m	21.01	
1990	European Championships	(Croatia) Split	8th	200 m	20.84	
1990	European Championships	(Croatia) Split	3rd	4 × 100 m relay	38.39	
1991	Mediterranean Games	(Greece) Athens	3rd	200 m	20.96	
1991	Mediterranean Games	(Greece) Athens	1st	4 × 100 m relay	39.12	
1991	World Championships	(Japan) Tokyo	5th	4 × 100 m relay	38.52	
1994	European Championships	(Finland) Helsinki	3rd	4 × 100 m relay	38.99	
1995	World Championships	(Sweden) Gothenburg	3rd	4 × 100 m relay	39.07	(Note: Team ran a better crono (38.41) in semifinal.)
1997	Mediterranean Games	(Italy) Bari	1st	4 × 100 m relay	38.61	CR

== National titles ==
Floris won three national championships at individual senior level.

- Italian Athletics Championships
  - 100 m: 1994
  - 200 m: 1989
- Italian Athletics Indoor Championships
  - 200 m: 1992

== See also ==
- Italy national relay team
