= 1990 European Athletics Championships – Men's 200 metres =

Men's 200 metres at the 1990 European Athletics Championships
- Venue: Stadion Poljud
- Location: Split
- Dates: 29 August (heats); 30 August (semi-finals and final)
- Competitors: 20 from 14 nations
- Winning time: 20.11

Medalists
gold medal	John Regis	Great Britain
silver medal	Jean-Charles Trouabal	France
bronze medal	Linford Christie	Great Britain

The men's 200 metres events at the 1990 European Athletics Championships in Split, Yugoslavia, were held at Stadion Poljud on 29 and 30 August 1990.

== Participation ==
According to an unofficial count, 20 athletes from 14 countries participated in the event.

- Belgium (1)
- Bulgaria (1)
- Cyprus (1)
- Denmark (1)
- France (3)
- Great Britain (3)
- Italy (2)
- Norway (1)
- Portugal (2)
- Soviet Union (1)
- Spain (1)
- Switzerland (1)
- Turkey (1)
- West Germany (1)

== Results ==
=== Heats ===
29 August

==== Heat 1 ====
Rank	Name	Nationality	Time	Notes
1	John Regis	Great Britain	20.67	Q
2	Gilles Quénéhervé	France	20.87	Q
3	Stefano Tilli	Italy	20.92	Q
4	Lars Pedersen	Denmark	21.02	Q
5	Enrique Talavera	Spain	21.15	q
6	Pedro Agostinho	Portugal	21.16	
7	Barış Özatman	Turkey	21.47	
			Wind: +1.1 m/s	

==== Heat 2 ====
Rank	Name	Nationality	Time	Notes
1	Jean-Charles Trouabal	France	20.45	Q
2	Oleg Fatun	Soviet Union	20.56	Q
3	Nikolay Antonov	Bulgaria	20.64	Q
4	Patrick Stevens	Belgium	20.76	Q
5	Marcus Adam	Great Britain	20.79	q
6	Luís Barroso	Portugal	20.89	q
7	Aham Okeke	Norway	21.14	q
			Wind: +3.4 m/s	

==== Heat 3 ====
Rank	Name	Nationality	Time	Notes
1	Sandro Floris	Italy	20.47	Q
2	Alain Reimann	Switzerland	20.81	Q
3	Linford Christie	Great Britain	20.85	Q
4	Peter Klein	West Germany	20.87	Q
5	Anninos Marcoullides	Cyprus	21.41	
6	Bruno Marie-Rose	France	21.46	
	Luis Rodríguez	Spain	DNS	
			Wind: +2.4 m/s	

=== Semi-finals ===
30 August

==== Heat 1 ====
Rank	Name	Nationality	Time	Notes
1	John Regis	Great Britain	20.16	Q
2	Jean-Charles Trouabal	France	20.54	Q
3	Nikolay Antonov	Bulgaria	20.67	Q
4	Stefano Tilli	Italy	20.75	Q
5	Marcus Adam	Great Britain	20.83	
5	Alain Reimann	Switzerland	21.07	
7	Lars Pedersen	Denmark	21.21	
8	Enrique Talavera	Spain	21.31	
			Wind: +0.5 m/s	

==== Heat 2 ====
Rank	Name	Nationality	Time	Notes
1	Linford Christie	Great Britain	20.56	Q
2	Sandro Floris	Italy	20.72	Q
3	Oleg Fatun	Soviet Union	20.86	Q
4	Patrick Stevens	Belgium	20.95	Q
5	Gilles Quénéhervé	France	21.00	
6	Peter Klein	West Germany	21.01	
7	Luís Barroso	Portugal	21.25	
8	Aham Okeke	Norway	21.37	

=== Final ===
30 August

Rank	Name	Nationality	Time	Notes
1st place, gold medalist(s)	John Regis	Great Britain	20.11	
2nd place, silver medalist(s)	Jean-Charles Trouabal	France	20.31	
3rd place, bronze medalist(s)	Linford Christie	Great Britain	20.33	
4	Stefano Tilli	Italy	20.66	
5	Nikolay Antonov	Bulgaria	20.68	
6	Oleg Fatun	Soviet Union	20.77	
7	Patrick Stevens	Belgium	20.80	
8	Sandro Floris	Italy	20.84	

== See also ==
- 1988 Men's Olympic 200 metres (Seoul)
- 1991 Men's World Championships 200 metres (Tokyo)
- 1992 Men's Olympic 200 metres (Barcelona)
