= Radoslav Holúbek =

Slovak sprinter

Personal information
- Nationality: Slovak
- Born: 28 November 1975 (age 50) Žilina, Czechoslovakia
- Height: 181 cm (5 ft 11 in)
- Weight: 80 kg (176 lb)

Sport
- Sport: Sprinting
- Event: 4 × 400 metres relay
- Club: AŠK Dukla Banská Bystrica

Radoslav Holúbek (born 28 November 1975) is a Slovak hurdler specializing in the 400 metres hurdles, who also was a member of the national record-breaking Slovak 4 × 400 m relay team.

== Career ==
At the 1994 World Junior Championships, he advanced to the semi-finals of the 400 m hurdles by finishing third in his heat. He placed sixth in his semi-final, running slower and failing to advance to the finals by 0.45 seconds. Holúbek later competed at the 1998 European Championships, the 1999 Military World Games and the 2000 Summer Olympics without reaching the final. At the Sydney Olympics, he competed in both the men's 4 × 400 metres relay and the 400 metres hurdles, finishing seventh individually in his heat.

At the European Cup, Holúbek mainly competed for Slovakia in the Second League. He finished second in the 400 m hurdles in 1995 (and the same placement in the 4 × 400 metres relay), won the 400 m hurdles competition at the 1997 European Cup, and was then promoted with Slovakia to the First League, where he finished fifth in 1998. Back in the Second League, he finished second in 1999 and won in 2000.

Domestically, he was a three-time Slovak Athletic Federation outdoor champion in the hurdles, as well as the 1995 indoor champion in the flat 400 m. His personal best time was 50.18 seconds, achieved in July 2000 in Budapest.
