= Thierry Lauret =

French sprinter

Personal information
- Nationality: French
- Born: 21 February 1965 (age 61)

Sport
- Sport: Sprinting
- Event: 100 metres

Thierry Lauret (born 21 February 1965) is a French sprinter. He competed in the men's 100 metres at the 1988 Summer Olympics.
