= Leung Wing Kwong =

Hong Kong athlete

Personal information
- Nationality: Hong Konger
- Born: 梁永光; jyutping: loeng4 wing5 gwong1 8 July 1966 (age 60)

Sport
- Sport: Sprinting
- Event: 100 metres

Leung Wing Kwong (born 8 July 1966) is a Hong Kong sprinter. He competed in the men's 100 metres at the 1988 Summer Olympics.
