= 1990 European Athletics Indoor Championships – Men's 200 metres =

The men's 200 metres event at the 1990 European Athletics Indoor Championships was held in Kelvin Hall on 3 and 4 March.

== Medalists ==
Gold	Silver	Bronze
Sandro Floris; Italy	Nikolay Antonov; Bulgaria	Bruno Marie-Rose; France

== Results ==
=== Heats ===
First 2 from each heat (Q) qualified directly for the semifinals.

Rank	Heat	Name	Nationality	Time	Notes
1	1	Nikolay Antonov	Bulgaria	21.23	Q
2	2	Sandro Floris	Italy	21.26	Q
3	1	Bruno Marie-Rose	France	21.46	Q
3	2	Andy Carrott	Great Britain	21.46	Q
5	3	Lars Pedersen	Denmark	21.48	Q
6	3	Clarence Callender	Great Britain	21.49	Q
7	4	Rodolphe Rosilette	France	21.50	Q
8	5	Carlo Occhiena	Italy	21.54	Q
9	5	Andreas Berger	Austria	21.55	Q
10	4	Anninos Marcoullides	Cyprus	21.59	Q
11	1	Luís Cunha	Portugal	21.60	
12	4	Michael Schwab	West Germany	21.71	
13	2	Franz Ratzenberger	Austria	21.84	
14	1	Giovanni Puggioni	Italy	21.85	
15	3	Pedro Curvelo	Portugal	21.92	
16	2	Gunnar Guðmundsson	Iceland	22.38	
	3	Andreas Linardatos	Greece	DNS	

=== Semifinals ===
First 2 from each semifinal (Q) and the next 1 fastest (q) qualified for the final.

Rank	Heat	Name	Nationality	Time	Notes
1	1	Nikolay Antonov	Bulgaria	21.12	Q
2	2	Sandro Floris	Italy	21.20	Q
3	1	Bruno Marie-Rose	France	21.22	Q
4	2	Rodolphe Rosilette	France	21.38	Q
5	2	Andy Carrott	Great Britain	21.39	q
6	1	Clarence Callender	Great Britain	21.51	
7	1	Carlo Occhiena	Italy	21.62	
7	2	Lars Pedersen	Denmark	21.62	
9	1	Andreas Berger	Austria	21.74	
10	2	Anninos Marcoullides	Cyprus	21.77	

=== Final ===
Rank	Lane	Name	Nationality	Time	Notes
1st place, gold medalist(s)	3	Sandro Floris	Italy	21.01	
2nd place, silver medalist(s)	2	Nikolay Antonov	Bulgaria	21.04	
3rd place, bronze medalist(s)	1	Bruno Marie-Rose	France	21.28	
4	4	Rodolphe Rosilette	France	21.34	
5	5	Andy Carrott	Great Britain	21.54	
