= Andre Cason =

American sprinter (born 1969)

Personal information
- Born: January 20, 1969 (age 57) Virginia Beach, Virginia, U.S.

Sport
- Sport: Running
- Event: Sprints
- College team: Texas A&M Aggies
Medal record
Men's Athletics
Representing the United States
IAAF World Championships
Gold medal – first place	1993 Stuttgart	4 × 100 m relay
Silver medal – second place	1993 Stuttgart	100 m
Gold medal – first place	1991 Tokyo	4 × 100 m relay
IAAF World Indoor Championships
Gold medal – first place	1991 Seville	60 m
Pan American Games
Silver medal – second place	1991 Havana	100 m
Universiade
Gold medal – first place	1989 Duisburg	100 m
Gold medal – first place	1989 Duisburg	4 × 100 m relay
IAAF World Cup
Gold medal – first place	1989 Barcelona	4 × 100 m relay

Andre Cason (born January 20, 1969) is an American former track and field sprinter. He was a member of the American 4 × 100 meters relay team that won the gold medal at the 1991 World Championships in Tokyo with a world record time of 37.50 seconds. A few weeks after this event, Cason ran his first sub-10-second 100 meters race when winning in Koblenz in 9.99 seconds.

Cason attended Texas A&M University, where he was a two-time NCAA champion, and seven-time All-American for the Aggies.

The 1992 season started well for Cason as he set the world indoor record for the 60 meters on three occasions, leaving a standing world record of 6.41, and equalled the world indoor record for the 50 meters with a time of 5.62. Cason kept his excellent form until the early summer. However, at the 1992 US Olympic Trials he suffered a career threatening injury with a torn Achilles tendon, and was out for the rest of the season.

In 1993 Cason won the 100 m at the USA Outdoor Track and Field Championships in Eugene, Oregon and won a silver medal over 100 m at the 1993 World Championships in Athletics in Stuttgart, running in 9.92 s. In the 4 × 100 m relay he was a member of the US team that tied the world record at 37.40 s in the semi-finals, and won the gold in the final with 37.48 s.

Cason coached the Liaoning Province Team Sprinters, and assisted in building and cultivating the Chinese National Sprint Team from 2010 to 2013. In 2014, Cason oversaw the high performance training for professional MMA fighters in Hong Kong. Since late 2014, Cason has been the National Sprint Coach for the country of Thailand, and the Thailand Olympic team.

== Personal bests ==
Event	Time (seconds)	Venue	Date
50 meters	5.62	Los Angeles, California, United States	February 15, 1992
60 meters	6.41	Madrid, Spain	February 14, 1992
100 meters	9.92	Stuttgart, Germany	August 15, 1993

== National titles ==
- USA Indoor Track and Field Championships
  - 60 m: 1991
- USA Outdoor Track and Field Championships
  - 100 m: 1993
