= Ousmane Diarra (Malian athlete) =

Malian sprinter (born 1966)

Personal information
- Born: 30 September 1966 (age 59)
- Height: 1.86 m (6 ft 1 in)
- Weight: 82 kg (181 lb)

Sport
- Sport: Track and field
- Events: 100 metres, 200 metres

Ousmane Diarra (born 30 September 1966) is a retired Malian athlete who competed in sprinting events. He competed at three consecutive Summer Olympics, beginning in 1988, in addition to five outdoor World Championships.

== Competition record ==
Year	Competition	Venue	Position	Event	Notes
Representing Mali
1988	Olympic Games	Seoul, South Korea	41st (qf)	100 m	10.61
1988	Olympic Games	Seoul, South Korea	37th (qf)	200 m	21.46
1989	Universiade	Duisburg, West Germany	14th (sf)	100 m	10.78
1989	Universiade	Duisburg, West Germany	33rd (h)	200 m	21.73
1991	World Championships	Tokyo, Japan	51st (h)	100 m	10.69
1991	World Championships	Tokyo, Japan	47th (h)	200 m	21.85
1992	Olympic Games	Barcelona, Spain	56th (h)	100 m	10.87
1992	Olympic Games	Barcelona, Spain	50th (h)	200 m	21.73
1993	World Championships	Stuttgart, Germany	20th (qf)	100 m	10.41
1993	World Championships	Stuttgart, Germany	50th (h)	200 m	21.51
1994	Jeux de la Francophonie	Bondoufle, France	7th	100 m	10.51
1995	World Championships	Gothenburg, Sweden	38th (qf)	100 m	10.54
1996	Olympic Games	Atlanta, United States	31st (qf)	100 m	10.38
1996	Olympic Games	Atlanta, United States	62nd (h)	200 m	21.20
1997	World Indoor Championships	Paris, France	–	60 m	DNF
1997	World Championships	Athens, Greece	47th (h)	100 m	10.42
1999	World Championships	Seville, Spain	–	100 m	DQ

== Personal bests ==
Outdoor

- 100 metres – 10.10 (+1.2 m/s) (Athens 1996)
- 200 metres – 20.98 (Harare 1995)

Indoor

- 60 metres – 6.63 (Atlanta 1996)
