= Arménio Fernandes =

Angolan athlete

Personal information
- Nationality: Angolan
- Born: 9 November 1959 (age 66)

Sport
- Sport: Sprinting
- Event: 100 metres

Arménio Fernandes (born 9 November 1959) is an Angolan sprinter. He competed in the men's 100 metres at the 1988 Summer Olympics in Seol. He competed in the ninth heat of round one, but did not progress.
