= Shinji Aoto =

Japanese bobsledder and sprinter (born 1967)

Personal information
- Born: 7 May 1967 (age 59) Wakayama, Japan
- Education: Chukyo University
- Height: 1.78 m (5 ft 10 in)
- Weight: 73 kg (161 lb)

Sport
- Sport: Athletics
- Events: 60 m, 100 m

Achievements and titles
- Personal bests: 60 m: 6.76 (1989); 100 m: 10.28 (1988, 1989)
Medal record
Men's athletics
Representing Japan
Universiade
Bronze medal – third place	1987 Zagreb	4×100 m relay
Asian Junior Championships
Silver medal – second place	1986 Jakarta	4×100 m relay

Shinji Aoto (青戸 慎司, Aoto Shinji; born 7 May 1967 in Wakayama) is a retired Japanese sprinter turned bobsledder who represented his country at the 1988 Summer Olympics and 1998 Winter Olympics. He is the first and only Japanese male athlete to compete in both the Summer and Winter Olympic games (As of 2020). During his athletics career he also competed at two World Indoor Championships, in 1989 and 1993. He was the former national record holder in the 100 metres and the first Japanese to run under 10.3 seconds. He is currently the deputy director of track and field club at Chukyo University.

== Athletics career ==
=== International competitions ===
Year	Competition	Venue	Position	Event	Notes
Representing Japan
1986	Asian Junior Championships	Jakarta, Indonesia	2nd	4 × 100 m relay	40.46
1987	Universiade	Zagreb, Yugoslavia	3rd	4 × 100 m relay	39.57
1988	Olympic Games	Seoul, South Korea	8th (sf)	4 × 100 m relay	38.90
1989	World Indoor Championships	Budapest, Hungary	16th (h)	60 m	6.76
1989	Universiade	Duisburg, West Germany	(sf)	100 m	10.71
1989	Universiade	Duisburg, West Germany	— (h)	4 × 100 m relay	DQ
1992	Olympic Games	Barcelona, Spain	23rd (qf)	100 m	10.53
1992	Olympic Games	Barcelona, Spain	6th	4 × 100 m relay	38.77
1993	World Indoor Championships	Toronto, Canada	28th (h)	60 m	6.87

=== National titles ===
- Japanese Championships
  - 100 metres: 1989
  - 4 × 100 metres relay: 1987

=== Personal bests ===
Outdoor

- 100 metres – 10.28 (+1.4 m/s, Tokyo 1988): Former national record

Indoor

- 60 metres – 6.76 (Budapest 1989)

== Bobsleigh career ==
=== International competitions ===
Year	Competition	Venue	Position	Event	Partners	Time	Run 1
Year	Competition	Venue	Position	Event	Partners	Time	Run 2
Year	Competition	Venue	Position	Event	Partners	Time	Run 3
Representing Japan
1998	Olympic Games	Nagano, Japan	16th	Four-man	Toshio Wakita; Yasuo Nakamura; Toshiya Onoda	2:41.97	54.03
1998	Olympic Games	Nagano, Japan	16th	Four-man	Toshio Wakita; Yasuo Nakamura; Toshiya Onoda	2:41.97	53.66
1998	Olympic Games	Nagano, Japan	16th	Four-man	Toshio Wakita; Yasuo Nakamura; Toshiya Onoda	2:41.97	54.28
