= Obinna Eregbu =

Nigerian long jumper (born 1969)

Personal information
- Born: 9 November 1969 (age 56) Owerri, Imo State, Nigeria

Sport
- Sport: Track and field
Medal record
Representing Nigeria
Commonwealth Games
Gold medal – first place	1994 Victoria	Long jump
Summer Universiade
Silver medal – second place	1993 Buffalo	Long jump
African Championships
Gold medal – first place	1993 Durban	Long jump

Obinna Eregbu // (born 9 November 1969) is a retired Nigerian athlete who competed in the long jump. His name, Obinna, means "Father´s heart". He is best known for his gold medal at the 1994 Commonwealth Games.

Eregbu competed for the Iowa State Cyclones track and field team in the NCAA.

His personal best jump was 8.22 metres, achieved in the qualifying round of the 1994 Commonwealth Games. This ranks him fifth among Nigerian long jumpers, behind Yusuf Alli (8.27 m), Charlton Ehizuelen (8.26 indoor), Paul Emordi (8.25) and George Ogbeide (8.24).

== Achievements ==
Year	Competition	Venue	Position	Event	Notes
Representing Nigeria
1986	World Junior Championships	Athens, Greece	6th	100m	10.52 (wind: +0.9 m/s)
1993	Universiade	Buffalo, United States	2nd	Long jump	8.18 m
1993	African Championships	Durban, South Africa	1st	Long jump	8.32 m w
1994	Commonwealth Games	Victoria, Canada	1st	Long jump	8.05 m
