= 1994 World Junior Championships in Athletics – Men's 400 metres hurdles =

The men's 400 metres hurdles event at the 1994 World Junior Championships in Athletics was held in Lisbon, Portugal, at Estádio Universitário de Lisboa on 20, 21 and 22 July.

== Medalists ==
Gold	Gennadiy Gorbenko; Ukraine
Silver	Miklós Roth; Hungary
Bronze	Noel Levy; United Kingdom

== Results ==
=== Final ===
22 July

Rank	Name	Nationality	Time	Notes
1st place, gold medalist(s)	Gennadiy Gorbenko	Ukraine	50.56	
2nd place, silver medalist(s)	Miklós Roth	Hungary	50.85	
3rd place, bronze medalist(s)	Noel Levy	United Kingdom	50.94	
4	Robert Jarabek	Slovakia	50.95	
5	Mohamed Al-Bishi	Saudi Arabia	51.70	
6	Kevin James	Jamaica	51.90	
7	Andrey Shcheglov	Russia	51.99	
8	Jaco Jonker	South Africa	53.65	

=== Semifinals ===
21 July

==== Semifinal 1 ====
Rank	Name	Nationality	Time	Notes
1	Gennadiy Gorbenko	Ukraine	50.81	Q
2	Miklós Roth	Hungary	51.04	Q
3	Jaco Jonker	South Africa	51.24	Q
4	Robert Jarabek	Slovakia	51.65	Q
5	Xavier Ravenet	France	51.84	
6	Lukáš Soucek	Czech Republic	51.97	
7	Hadi Al-Somaily	Saudi Arabia	52.37	
8	Matthew Beckenham	Australia	52.68	

==== Semifinal 2 ====
Rank	Name	Nationality	Time	Notes
1	Kevin James	Jamaica	50.79	Q
2	Noel Levy	United Kingdom	50.91	Q
3	Mohamed Al-Bishi	Saudi Arabia	51.56	Q
4	Andrey Shcheglov	Russia	51.73	Q
5	Marcel Schelbert	Switzerland	51.82	
6	Radoslav Holúbek	Slovakia	52.17	
7	Corey Murdock	United States	53.00	
8	Osita Okeagu	Nigeria	53.23	

=== Heats ===
20 July

==== Heat 1 ====
Rank	Name	Nationality	Time	Notes
1	Gennadiy Gorbenko	Ukraine	51.26	Q
2	Marcel Schelbert	Switzerland	51.45	Q
3	Panayiótis Mandelidis	Greece	52.34	
4	Andrew Franklin	Australia	52.40	
5	Wang Hsiang-Yi	Chinese Taipei	52.78	
6	Edward Clarke	Jamaica	54.66	
7	Boris Gorban	Tajikistan	57.81	

==== Heat 2 ====
Rank	Name	Nationality	Time	Notes
1	Mohamed Al-Bishi	Saudi Arabia	51.42	Q
2	Lukáš Soucek	Czech Republic	51.53	Q
3	Xavier Ravenet	France	51.63	q
4	Robert Jarabek	Slovakia	51.78	q
5	Zion Armstrong	New Zealand	52.59	
6	Borja Huerto	Spain	52.81	
7	Chris Wagner	Canada	55.09	

==== Heat 3 ====
Rank	Name	Nationality	Time	Notes
1	Kevin James	Jamaica	52.14	Q
2	Osita Okeagu	Nigeria	52.54	Q
3	Markus Diemand	Germany	53.18	
4	Aaron Haynes	United States	53.21	
5	Lee Du-yeon	South Korea	53.23	
6	Gabriel Burnett	Barbados	55.91	

==== Heat 4 ====
Rank	Name	Nationality	Time	Notes
1	Miklós Roth	Hungary	52.03	Q
2	Andrey Shcheglov	Russia	52.21	Q
3	Corey Murdock	United States	52.24	q
4	Jaroslaw Kalbarczyk	Poland	52.51	
5	Daniel Hechler	Germany	52.90	
6	Takahito Yamazaki	Japan	53.00	
7	Alex Hunte	United Kingdom	54.04	

==== Heat 5 ====
Rank	Name	Nationality	Time	Notes
1	Jaco Jonker	South Africa	51.59	Q
2	Matthew Beckenham	Australia	51.83	Q
3	Radoslav Holúbek	Slovakia	51.95	q
4	Bartosz Gruman	Poland	52.50	
5	Tibor Eckermann	Hungary	52.84	
6	Lin Wen-Hao	Chinese Taipei	53.28	
7	Amine Harchouche	Algeria	53.69	

==== Heat 6 ====
Rank	Name	Nationality	Time	Notes
1	Noel Levy	United Kingdom	51.51	Q
2	Hadi Al-Somaily	Saudi Arabia	51.88	Q
3	Constantin Budeanu	Romania	52.53	
4	Nobuyuki Suzuki	Japan	52.61	
5	Andrés Alarcón	Spain	53.27	
6	Yvon Rakotoarimiandry	Madagascar	54.06	

== Participation ==
According to an unofficial count, 40 athletes from 28 countries participated in the event.

- Algeria (1)
- Australia (2)
- Barbados (1)
- Canada (1)
- Chinese Taipei (2)
- Czech Republic (1)
- France (1)
- Germany (2)
- Greece (1)
- Hungary (2)
- Jamaica (2)
- Japan (2)
- Madagascar (1)
- New Zealand (1)
- Nigeria (1)
- Poland (2)
- Romania (1)
- Russia (1)
- Saudi Arabia (2)
- Slovakia (2)
- South Africa (1)
- South Korea (1)
- Spain (2)
- Switzerland (1)
- Tajikistan (1)
- Ukraine (1)
- United Kingdom (2)
- United States (2)
