= Joel Isasi =

Cuban sprinter (born 1967)

Personal information
- Born: July 31, 1967 (age 59) Matanzas, Cuba
Medal record
Men's athletics
Representing Cuba
Olympic Games
Bronze medal – third place	1992 Barcelona	4×100 m relay
Pan American Games
Gold medal – first place	1995 Mar del Plata	4×100 m relay
Silver medal – second place	1995 Mar del Plata	100 m
Central American and Caribbean Games
Gold medal – first place	1990 Mexico City	100 m
Gold medal – first place	1993 Ponce	100 m
Summer Universiade
Bronze medal – third place	1989 Duisburg	100 m
Bronze medal – third place	1993 Buffalo	4x100 m relay

Joel Isasi González (Spanish pronunciation: [xoˈel iˈsasi]; born July 31, 1967) is a former sprinter from Cuba.

He who won an Olympic bronze medal in 4 x 100 metres relay in Barcelona 1992 and a silver medal at the 4 x 100 relay at the 1990 Goodwill Games. His personal best of 10.22 (100 metres) and 21.64 (200 metres) was both set during 1995.

== International competitions ==
Year	Competition	Venue	Position	Event	Notes
Representing Cuba
1986	Central American and Caribbean; Junior Championships (U-20)	Mexico City, México	3rd	100 m	10.49 A
1986	Central American and Caribbean; Junior Championships (U-20)	Mexico City, México	4th	200 m	21.56 A
1986	Pan American Junior Championships	Winter Park, United States	2nd	4 × 100 m	40.62
1986	World Junior Championships	Athens, Greece	26th (qf)	100 m	10.96 (-2.7 m/s)
1986	World Junior Championships	Athens, Greece	39th (h)	200 m	22.15 (+1.5 m/s)
1986	World Junior Championships	Athens, Greece	4th	4 × 100 m	40.30
1989	Central American and Caribbean Championships	San Juan, Puerto Rico	1st	100 m	10.33
1989	Central American and Caribbean Championships	San Juan, Puerto Rico	2nd	4 × 100 m relay	39.89
1989	Universiade	Duisburg, West Germany	3rd	100 m	10.41
1989	World Cup	Barcelona, Spain	9th	100 m	10.52^{1}
1989	World Cup	Barcelona, Spain	6th	4 × 100 m relay	39.07^{1}
1990	Goodwill Games	Seattle, United States	2nd	4 × 100 m relay	38.49
1990	Central American and Caribbean Games	Mexico City, Mexico	1st	100 m	10.17
1990	Central American and Caribbean Games	Mexico City, Mexico	1st	4 × 100 m relay	39.09
1991	World Indoor Championships	Seville, Spain	6th	60 m	6.64
1991	Pan American Games	Havana, Cuba	4th	100 m	10.51
1992	Ibero-American Championships	Seville, Spain	1st	100 m	10.41 (-2.2 m/s)
1992	Ibero-American Championships	Seville, Spain	1st	4 × 100 m	39.19
1992	Olympic Games	Barcelona, Spain	3rd	4 × 100 m	38.00
1993	World Indoor Championships	Toronto, Canada	5th	60 m	6.61
1993	Universiade	Buffalo, United States	4th	100 m	10.17 (w)
1993	Universiade	Buffalo, United States	3rd	4 × 100 m	39.20
1993	Central American and Caribbean Games	Ponce, Puerto Rico	1st	100 m	10.38
1993	Central American and Caribbean Games	Ponce, Puerto Rico	1st	4 × 100 m	39.24
1995	Pan American Games	Mar del Plata, Argentina	2nd	100 m	10.23 (w)
1995	Pan American Games	Mar del Plata, Argentina	1st	4 × 100 m	38.67
1995	World Championships	Gothenburg, Sweden	6th (sf)	100 m	10.22 (+1.8 m/s)
1995	World Championships	Gothenburg, Sweden	—	4 × 100 m	DQ

^{1}Representing the Americas
