= 1985 European Athletics Junior Championships =

- Level: Under 20
- Events: 39

The 1985 European Athletics Junior Championships was the eighth edition of the biennial athletics competition for European athletes aged under twenty. It was held in Cottbus, East Germany between 22 and 25 August.

== Men's results ==
Event	Gold		Silver		Bronze	
100 m	Elliot Bunney (GBR)	10.38	Endre Havas (HUN)	10.40	John Regis (GBR)	10.51
200 m	Ade Mafe (GBR)	20.54	Richard Ashby (GBR)	20.85	Endre Havas (HUN)	21.00
400 m	Roger Black (GBR)	45.36	Yan Krasnikov (URS)	46.31	Jacques Farraudière (FRA)	46.37
800 m	Ralph Schumann (GDR)	1:51.28	Jussi Udelhoven (FRG)	1:51.96	Geir Søgnebotnen (NOR)	1:51.98
1500 m	Mika Maaskola (FIN)	3:44.99	Neil Horsfield (GBR)	3:45.39	Hauke Fuhlbrügge (GDR)	3:45.60
3000 m	Nick O'Brien (IRL)	8:10.75	Andrey Usachov (URS)	8:10.90	John Nuttall (GBR)	8:11.72
5000 m	Paul Taylor (GBR)	14:12.45	Volker Iwanowski (GDR)	14:14.83	José Manuel García (ESP)	14:17.87
110 m hurdles	Jon Ridgeon (GBR)	13.46	Colin Jackson (GBR)	13.69	Fausto Frigerio (ITA)	14.10
400 m hurdles	Oleg Singatullin (URS)	50.64	Klaus Ehrle (AUT)	50.99	Carsten Köhrbrück (FRG)	51.23
2000 m s'chase	Nikolay Matyushenko (URS)	5:28.31	Sándor Serfõzõ (HUN)	5:34.98	Marián Huncík (TCH)	5:35.83
4 × 100 m relay	Great Britain (GBR); Trevor McKenzie; Elliot Bunney; Richard Ashby; John Regis	39.80	Poland (POL); Jacek Marlicki; Andrzej Popa; Jacek Konopka; Marek Parjaszewski	40.18	Soviet Union (URS); Vitaliy Savin; Viktor Ivanov; Sergey Klyonov; Dmitriy Dontsov	40.32
4 × 400 m relay	Great Britain (GBR); Mark Tyler; John Rigg; Ade Mafe; Roger Black	3:07.18	West Germany (FRG); Bernd Müller; Volker Höschele; Edgar Itt; Thomas Beblo	3:08.02	Soviet Union (URS); Andrey Cherevchenko; Sergey Dobrovolskiy; Oleg Singatullin; Yan Krasnikov	3:08.32
10.000 m walk	Mikhail Shchennikov (URS)	42:00.63	Daniel Plaza (ESP)	42:16.39	Giovanni De Benedictis (ITA)	42:56.80
High jump	John Hill (GBR)	2.24 m	Róbert Ruffíni (TCH)	2.24 m	Georgi Dakov (BUL)	2.18 m
Pole vault	Igor Trandenkov (URS)	5.45 m	Grigoriy Yegorov (URS)	5.40 m	Mike Thiede (GDR)	5.30 m
Long jump	Volker Mai (GDR)	7.99 m	Marco Delonge (GDR)	7.96 m	Emiel Mellaard (NED)	7.79 m
Triple jump	Volker Mai (GDR)	16.83 m	Yuriy Gorbachenko (URS)	16.61 m	Piotr Weremczuk (POL)	16.21 m
Shot put	Oliver-Sven Buder (GDR)	19.34 m	Oleksandr Bagach (URS)	18.48 m	Maik Prollius (GDR)	18.09 m
Discus throw	Attila Horváth (HUN)	60.02 m	Rüdiger Pudenz (GDR)	58.74 m	Vasiliy Kaptyukh (URS)	57.18 m
Hammer throw	Andreï Abduvaliev (URS)	72.44 m	Steffen Raschik (GDR)	68.82 m	Valentin Kirov (BUL)	66.16 m
Javelin throw	Andrey Maznichenk (URS)	79.92 m	Gary Jenson (GBR)	75.68 m	Bogdan Patelka (POL)	75.68 m
Decathlon	Thomas Fahner (GDR)	7815 pts	Igor Drobyshevskiy (URS)	7633 pts	André Preysing (GDR)	7476 pts

== Women's results ==
Event	Gold		Silver		Bronze	
100 m	Kerstin Behrendt (GDR)	11.21	Annarita Balzani (ITA)	11.60	Helen Miles (GBR)	11.63
200 m	Kerstin Behrendt (GDR)	23.21	Louise Stuart (GBR)	23.83	Marina Krivosheina (URS)	23.94
400 m	Olga Pesnopevtseva (URS)	53.37	Nicole Leistenschneider (FRG)	53.47	Oksana Petrenko (URS)	53.93
800 m	Maria Pintea (ROM) Gabriela Sedláková (TCH)	2:03.22	Not awarded		Ellen Kiessling (GDR)	2:04.18
1500 m	Ana Padurean (ROM)	4:16.32	Marie-Pierre Duros (FRA)	4:18.34	Tatyana Vokhmintseva (URS)	4:19.86
3000 m	Cleopatra Palacian (ROM)	9:05.52	Christin Sørum (NOR)	9:07.54	Angela Madrakhimova (URS)	9:13.66
100 m hurdles	Monique Éwanjé-Épée (FRA)	13.10	Heike Tillack (GDR)	13.24	Lidiya Okolo-Kulak (URS)	13.30
400 m hurdles	Claudia Bartl (GDR)	56.22	Zhivka Petkova (BUL)	56.50	Sabine Zwiener (FRG)	57.78
4 × 100 m relay	East Germany (GDR); Frauke Damberg; Kerstin Behrendt; Heike Tillack; Claudia Schuster	44.30	Soviet Union (URS); Irina Kot; Tatyana Papilina; Marina Krivosheyna; Lidiya Okolo-Kulak	44.49	Great Britain (GBR); Helen Miles; Georgina Oladapo; Hayley Clements; Louise Stuart	44.78
4 × 400 m relay	West Germany (FRG); Silke-Beate Knoll; Nicole Leistenschneider; Andrea Jirousch; Sabine Zwiener	3:32.67	East Germany (GDR); Susan Machmüller; Susanne Sieger; Claudia Bartl; Dagmar Stuhr	3:34.40	Great Britain (GBR); Georgina Honley; Lynne Robinson; Dawn Flockhart; Loreen Hall	3:35.10
5000 m walk	Mari Cruz Díaz (ESP) María Reyes Sobrino (ESP)	22:56.84	Not awarded		Svetlana Kaburkina (URS)	23:03.45
High jump	Natalya Golodnova (URS)	1.94 m	Olga Turchak (URS)	1.91 m	Svetlana Isaeva (BUL)	1.88 m
Long jump	Sofiya Bozhanova (BUL)	6.68 m	Silke Harms (FRG)	6.56 m	Yelena Davydova (URS)	6.55 m
Shot put	Bettina Libera (GDR)	18.76 m	Ilke Wyludda (GDR)	18.11 m	Stephanie Storp (FRG)	17.45 m
Discus throw	Ilke Wyludda (GDR)	57.38 m	Viktoriya Kochetkova (URS)	56.78 m	Larisa Korotkevich (URS)	56.62 m
Javelin throw	Regine Kempter (GDR)	61.70 m	Danica Živanov (YUG)	60.10 m	Ingrid Lammertsma (NED)	55.92 m
Heptathlon	Emilia Dimitrova (BUL)	6079 pts	Yelena Davydova (URS)	6051 pts	Birgit Gautzsch (GDR)	5852 pts

== Medal table ==
Rank	Nation	Gold	Silver	Bronze	Total
1	East Germany (GDR)	12	7	6	25
2	Soviet Union (URS)	8	10	11	29
3	Great Britain (GBR)	8	5	5	18
4	Romania (ROU)	3	0	0	3
5	Bulgaria (BUL)	2	1	3	6
6	Spain (ESP)	2	1	1	4
7	West Germany (FRG)	1	4	3	8
8	Hungary (HUN)	1	2	1	4
9	Czechoslovakia (TCH)	1	1	1	3
9	France (FRA)	1	1	1	3
11	Finland (FIN)	1	0	0	1
11	Ireland (IRL)	1	0	0	1
13	Italy (ITA)	0	1	2	3
13	Poland (POL)	0	1	2	3
15	Norway (NOR)	0	1	1	2
16	Austria (AUT)	0	1	0	1
16	Yugoslavia (YUG)	0	1	0	1
18	Netherlands (NED)	0	0	2	2
Totals (18 entries)		41	37	39	117
