= Florencio Gascón =

Spanish sprinter

Personal information
- Born: 24 January 1964 (age 62) Madrid, Spain
- Height: 1.73 m (5 ft 8 in)
- Weight: 68 kg (150 lb)

Sport
- Sport: Track and field
- Event: 100 metres

Florencio Gascón Álvarez (born 24 January 1964) is a retired Spanish athlete who specialised in sprinting events. He represented his country at the 1988 Summer Olympics as well as the 1991 World Indoor Championships.

== Competition record ==
Year	Competition	Venue	Position	Event	Notes
Representing Spain
1983	European Junior Championships	Schwechat, Austria	14th (sf)	100 m	10.84
1983	Ibero-American Championships	Barcelona, Spain	1st	4 × 100 m relay	40.40
1986	European Indoor Championships	Madrid, Spain	14th (h)	60 m	6.76
1986	Ibero-American Championships	Havana, Cuba	3rd	4 × 100 m relay	40.15
1988	Ibero-American Championships	Mexico City, Mexico	2nd	4 × 100 m relay	39.36
1988	Olympic Games	Seoul, South Korea	–	4 × 100 m relay	DNF
1989	Universiade	Duisburg, West Germany	23rd (qf)	100 m	10.62
1989	Universiade	Duisburg, West Germany	5th	4 × 100 m relay	39.98
1989	World Cup	Barcelona, Spain	9th	4 × 100 m relay	39.69
1990	European Championships	Split, Yugoslavia	18th (h)	100 m	10.56
1990	European Championships	Split, Yugoslavia	6th	4 × 100 m relay	39.10
1990	Ibero-American Championships	Manaus, Brazil	5th	100 m	10.56
1990	Ibero-American Championships	Manaus, Brazil	2nd	4 × 100 m relay	40.49
1991	World Indoor Championships	Seville, Spain	13th (sf)	60 m	6.75

== Personal bests ==
Outdoor

- 100 metres – 10.47 (-0.7 m/s, Soria 1990)

Indoor

- 60 metres – 6.69 (Madrid 1991)
