= Frank Maziya =

Swazi sprinter

Personal information
- Nationality: Swazi
- Born: 22 May 1961 (age 65)

Sport
- Sport: Sprinting
- Event: 100 metres

Frank Maziya (born 22 May 1961) is a Swazi sprinter. He competed in the men's 100 metres at the 1988 Summer Olympics.

== Career ==
Maziya was seeded in the 5th 100 metres heat at the 1988 Olympics. He ran 11.52 seconds to place 8th in his heat and did not advance. The time was a personal best.
