= Andrzej Popa =

Polish sprinter

Personal information
- Born: 30 March 1968 (age 58)

Sport
- Sport: Track and field
Medal record
Representing Poland
European Junior Championships
Silver medal – second place	1985 Cottbus	4x100m relay
Silver medal – second place	1987 Birmingham	100m
Silver medal – second place	1987 Birmingham	200m

Andrzej Popa (born 30 March 1968) is a retired Polish sprinter who specialized in the 100 and 200 metres.

At the 1985 European Junior Championships he reached the semi-final of the 100 metres and won a silver medal in the 4 x 100 metres relay. At the 1987 European Junior Championships he won silver medals in both the 100 and 200 metres. Popa finished sixth in the 200 metres at the 1989 European Indoor Championships and competed at the 1989 World Indoor Championships without reaching the final. In the same year he became Polish indoor champion in the 60 and 200 metres, his only national titles.

His personal best times were 10.39 seconds, achieved in June 1988 in Poznań; and 20.95 seconds, achieved in August 1988 in Lublin.
