= Nikolay Antonov =

Bulgarian athlete

Personal information
- Native name: Николай Антонов
- Born: 17 August 1968 (age 57) Razgrad, Bulgaria

Sport
- Country: Bulgaria
Medal record
Representing Bulgaria
World Indoor Championships
Gold medal – first place	1991 Seville	200m
European Indoor Championships
Gold medal – first place	1992 Genoa	200m
Silver medal – second place	1988 Budapest	200m
Silver medal – second place	1990 Glasgow	200m

Nikolay Antonov (Bulgarian: Николай Антонов, born 17 August 1968) is a retired Bulgarian athlete. He started as a 200 metres sprinter, and won the 1991 World Indoor Championships and 1992 European Athletics Indoor Championships. In 1993 he switched to long jump.

His personal best time was 20.20 seconds, achieved at the 1991 World Championships earned him the title "the fastest white man on the planet". It is also the Bulgarian record. Antonov defeated Carl Lewis in the 200 metres in March 1992 at an indoor meet in San Sebastian, Spain. He was timed in 20.51, Lewis in 20.75.

His personal best long jump was 8.21 metres, achieved in July 1994 in Plovdiv. This ranks him fifth among Bulgarian long jumpers, behind Ivaylo Mladenov, Atanas Atanasov, Nikolay Atanasov and Petar Dachev.

== International competitions ==
Representing Bulgaria
Year	Competition	Venue	Position	Event	Result	Notes
1986	World Junior Championships	Athens, Greece	7th	100 m	10.53	wind: +0.9 m/s
1986	World Junior Championships	Athens, Greece	4th	200 m	21.37	wind: +0.2 m/s
1986	World Junior Championships	Athens, Greece	10th (h)	4 × 100 m relay	40.56	
1988	European Indoor Championships	Budapest, Hungary	2nd	200 m	20.65	
1989	European Indoor Championships	The Hague, Bulgaria	–	200 m	DQ	
1990	European Indoor Championships	Glasgow, United Kingdom	2nd	200 m	21.04	
1990	European Championships	Split, Yugoslavia	5th	200 m	20.68	wind: 0.0 m/s
1991	World Indoor Championships	Seville, Spain	1st	200 m	20.67	
1991	World Championships	Tokyo, Japan	7th	200 m	20.59	
1992	European Indoor Championships	Genoa, Italy	1st	200 m	20.41	
1992	Olympic Games	Barcelona, Spain	6th (sf)	200 m	20.55	
1993	World Indoor Championships	Toronto, Canada	5th	200 m	21.20	
1993	World Championships	Stuttgart, Germany	6th	Long jump	7.97 m	
1994	European Championships	Helsinki, Finland	22nd (q)	Long jump	7.63 m	wind: 0.0 m/s

== See also ==
- List of World Athletics Indoor Championships medalists (men)
- List of European Athletics Indoor Championships medalists (men)
- List of Balkan Athletics Championships winners (men)
- List of Bulgarian Athletics Championships winners
