= Babacar Pouye =

Senegalese sprinter

Personal information
- Nationality: Senegalese
- Born: 2 February 1968 (age 58)

Sport
- Sport: Sprinting
- Event: 4 × 100 metres relay

Babacar Pouye (born 2 February 1968) is a Senegalese sprinter. He competed in the men's 4 × 100 metres relay at the 1988 Summer Olympics.
