= Amadou M'Baye =

Senegalese sprinter

Personal information
- Nationality: Senegalese
- Born: 31 May 1964 (age 62)

Sport
- Sport: Sprinting
- Event: 100 metres
Medal record
Men's athletics
Representing Senegal
African Championships
Silver medal – second place	1990 Cairo	4×100 m
Silver medal – second place	1992 Belle Vue Harel	4×100 m

Amadou M’Bagnick M'Baye (born 31 May 1964) is a Senegalese sprinter. He competed in the men's 100 metres at the 1988 Summer Olympics.
