= Andrey Razin (sprinter) =

Soviet athlete

Personal information
- Nationality: Soviet
- Born: 19 September 1962 (age 63)

Sport
- Sport: Sprinting
- Event: 100 metres
Medal record
Representing Soviet Union
Summer Universiade
Silver medal – second place	1989 Duisburg	4x100m relay

Andrey Vasilyevich Razin (Russian: Андрей Васильевич Разин; born 19 September 1962) is a Soviet sprinter. He competed in the men's 100 metres at the 1988 Summer Olympics.
