= St. Clair Soleyne =

Antiguan sprinter

Personal information
- Nationality: Antigua and Barbuda
- Born: 26 September 1967 (age 58)

Sport
- Sport: Sprinting
- Event: 100 metres

St. Clair Soleyne (born 26 September 1967) is an Antigua and Barbuda sprinter. He competed in the men's 100 metres at the 1988 Summer Olympics.
