= Slip Watkins =

American sprinter

Personal information
- Born: September 29, 1967 (age 58) Fort Lauderdale, Florida, United States

Sport
- Sport: Track and field
Medal record
Representing United States
Summer Universiade
| Gold medal – first place | 1989 Duisburg | 4x100m relay |

Walker Lee "Slip" Watkins (born September 29, 1967) is an American former sprinter. He was selected by the Detroit Lions in the eleventh round of the 1991 NFL draft.

Watkins competed for the LSU Tigers track and field team in the NCAA.
