= John Regis (athlete) =

British sprinter

John Regis MBE
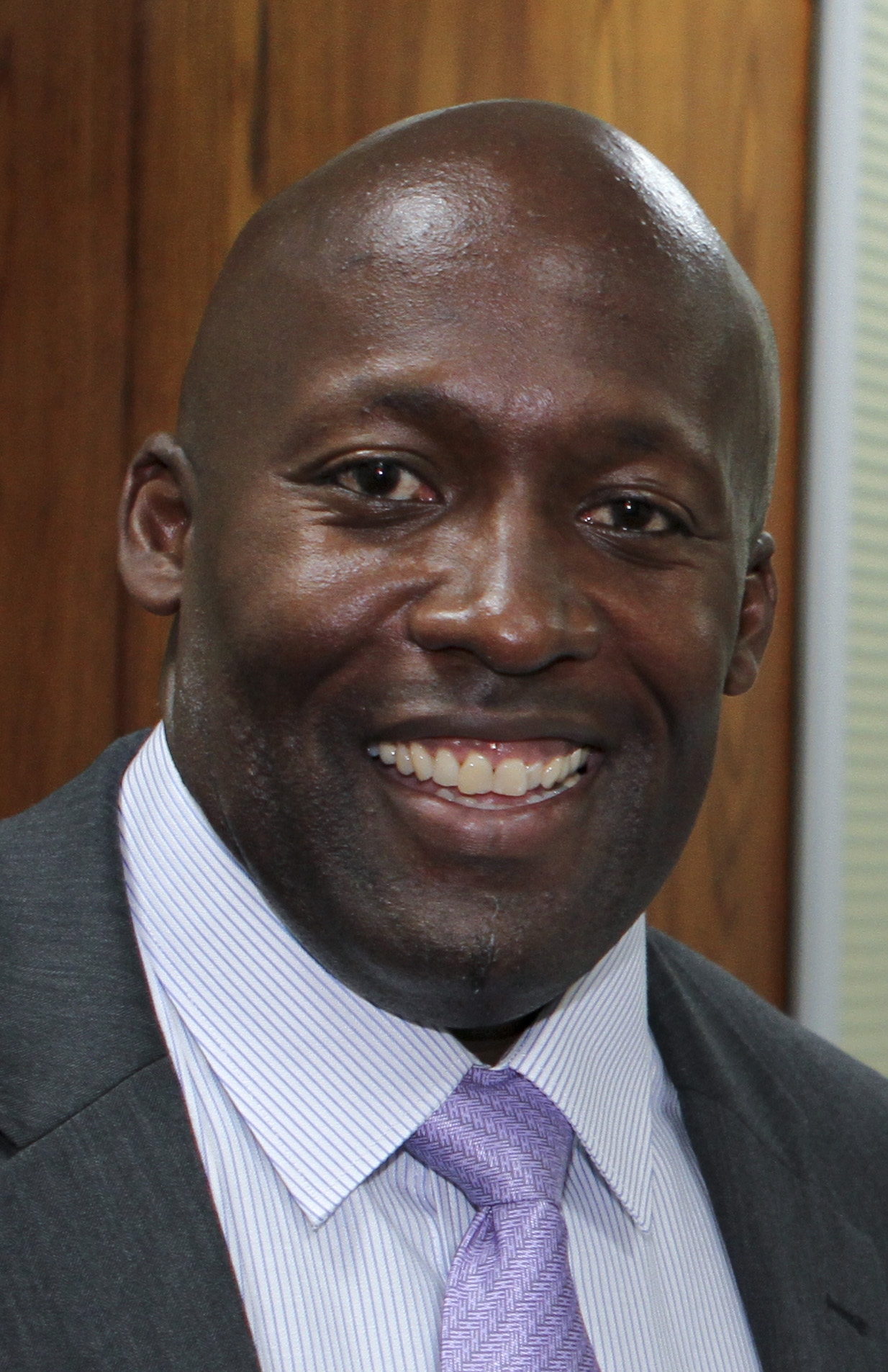
- Regis in 2012

Personal information
- Full name: John Paul Lyndon Regis
- Nationality: British
- Born: 13 October 1966 (age 59) Lewisham, London

Sport
- Sport: Track
- Events: 100 metres, 4 × 100 metres relay, 200 metres, 400 metres, 4 × 400 metres relay
Medal record
Representing Great Britain
Men's athletics
Olympic Games
Silver medal – second place	1988 Seoul	4 × 100 m relay
Bronze medal – third place	1992 Barcelona	4 × 400 m relay
World Championships
Gold medal – first place	1991 Tokyo	4 × 400 m relay
Silver medal – second place	1993 Stuttgart	200 m
Silver medal – second place	1993 Stuttgart	4 × 100 m relay
Bronze medal – third place	1987 Rome	200 m
Bronze medal – third place	1991 Tokyo	4 × 100 m relay
World Indoor Championships
Gold medal – first place	1989 Budapest	200 m
European Championships
Gold medal – first place	1990 Split	200 m
Gold medal – first place	1990 Split	4 × 400 m relay
Silver medal – second place	1990 Split	4 × 100 m relay
Bronze medal – third place	1990 Split	100 m
European Indoor Championships
Silver medal – second place	1989 The Hague	200 m
Bronze medal – third place	1987 Lieven	200 m
European Junior Championships
Gold medal – first place	1985 Cottbus	4 × 100 m relay
Bronze medal – third place	1985 Cottbus	100 m
Representing England
Commonwealth Games
Gold medal – first place	1990 Auckland	4 × 100 m relay
Silver medal – second place	1990 Auckland	200 m
Silver medal – second place	1994 Victoria, B.C.	200 m
Bronze medal – third place	1998 Kuala Lumpur	200 m

John Paul Lyndon Regis, MBE (born 13 October 1966) is a British former sprinter. During his career, he won gold medals in the 200 metres at the 1989 World Indoor Championships and the 1990 European Championships, and a silver medal in the distance at the 1993 World Championships.

He was a member of the British teams which won the gold medal in the 4 × 400 metres relay at the 1991 World Championships, and the silver medal in the 4 × 100 metres relay at the 1988 Olympic Games. Regis was the British 200 metres record-holder, which he set in 1994 until Zharnel Hughes broke the 30-year British record by clocking 19.73 seconds on 23 July 2023.

== Career ==
Regis's most significant successes in individual events came when competing in the 200 metres. He was the first British athlete to run under 20 seconds for the distance, and still held the UK record for the event in 2023 before it was finally broken by Zharnel Hughes. He was an indoor world champion and an outdoor World Championship runner-up at the distance, and also finished sixth in the event at the 1992 Olympic Games.

Regis also achieved considerable success running in relay races, winning major international medals in both the 4 × 100 metres relay and the 4 × 400 metres relay. Most notably, he ran the third leg for the British 4 × 400 m relay team at the 1991 World Championships in Tokyo, helping them defeat the heavily favoured team from the United States and claim the gold medal. He was also a part of the British 4 × 400 m team in 1990 which set a European Championship record for the event. On 3 March 1991, Regis was a member of the British team which set the world indoor record for the rarely contested 4 × 200 metres with a time of 1:22.11, which has not yet been bettered.

Regis was a six-times British 200 metres AAA champion after winning the British AAA Championships title in 1986, 1987, 1990, 1992, 1995 and 1996 and a four-times UK Athletics Championships winner in 1985, 1987, 1991 and 1993.

In 2000 Regis and fellow sprinter Marcus Adam were recruited for bobsleigh training with the British team. Adam went on to compete in the 2002 Winter Olympics.

== Personal life ==
Growing up, Regis competed for Lewisham at the London Youth Games. He was appointed a Member of the Order of the British Empire (MBE) in the 1994 Birthday Honours for services to athletics. In 1989, he opened an all-weather running track at Wellesley Recreation Ground (known as "the Well") in Great Yarmouth.

He was a cousin of former England international footballer Cyrille Regis.

Regis's 15-year-old nephew, Adam Regis, was stabbed to death on Saturday 17 March 2007 in Plaistow, Newham, east London.

== Personal bests ==
- 100 metres – 10.07 sec (Split, Yugoslavia, 28 August 1990)
- 200 metres – 19.87 sec (Sestriere, Italy, 31 July 1994, former UK record)
- 400 metres – 45.48 sec (Walnut, California, US, 17 April 1993)

== International competition record ==
Representing Great Britain and England
Year	Competition	Venue	Position	Event	Notes
1987	World Championships	Rome, Italy	3rd	200 m	20.18
1988	Olympic Games	Seoul, South Korea	2nd	4 × 100 m relay	38.28
1989	World Indoor Championships	Budapest, Hungary	1st	200 metres	20.54
1989	IAAF World Cup	Barcelona, Spain	2nd	4 × 100 m relay	38.34
1990	European Championships	Split, Yugoslavia	3rd	100 m	10.07 w (wind: +2.2 m/s)
1990	European Championships	Split, Yugoslavia	1st	200 m	20.11 (wind: 0.0 m/s)
1990	European Championships	Split, Yugoslavia	2nd	4 × 100 m relay	37.98
1990	European Championships	Split, Yugoslavia	1st	4 × 400 m relay	2:58.22 CR
1990	Commonwealth Games	Auckland, New Zealand	2nd	200 metres	20.16 w
1990	Commonwealth Games	Auckland, New Zealand	1st	4 × 100 m relay	38.67
1991	World Championships	Tokyo, Japan	1st	4 × 400 m relay	2:57.53
1991	World Championships	Tokyo, Japan	3rd	4 × 100 m relay	38.09
1992	Olympic Games	Barcelona, Spain	6th	200 m	20.55
1992	Olympic Games	Barcelona, Spain	4th	4 × 100 m relay	38.08
1992	Olympic Games	Barcelona, Spain	3rd	4 × 400 m relay	2:59.73
1993	World Championships	Stuttgart, Germany	2nd	200 m	19.94
1993	World Championships	Stuttgart, Germany	2nd	4 × 100 m relay	37.77
1994	Commonwealth Games	Victoria, Canada	2nd	200 m	20.25
1994	IAAF World Cup	London, England	1st	200 m	20.45 (wind: -1.4 m/s)
1994	IAAF World Cup	London, England	1st	4 × 100 m relay	38.46
1995	World Championships	Gothenburg, Sweden	7th	200 m	20.67
1995	World Championships	Gothenburg, Sweden	5th (sf)	4 × 100 metres relay	38.75
1996	Olympic Games	Atlanta, United States	6th (sf)	200 m	20.58
1998	Commonwealth Games	Kuala Lumpur, Malaysia	3rd	200 m	20.40

Sporting positions
Preceded by Frankie Fredericks	Men's 200 m Best Year Performance; 1994	Succeeded by Michael Johnson
