= Jarosław Kaniecki =

Polish sprinter

Personal information
- Born: 11 May 1967 (age 59) Bydgoszcz, Poland

Sport
- Sport: Track and field

Jarosław Kaniecki (born 11 May 1967) is a retired Polish sprinter who specialized in the 200 metres.

He finished sixth at the 1988 World Junior Championships and reached the quarter-final at the 1991 World Championships. He also competed in the 4 x 100 metres relay at the 1991 World Championships, but the Polish team did not reach the final. He became Polish champion in both 100 and 200 metres in 1991, and Polish indoor champion in the 200 metres in 1991.

His personal best 100 metres time was 10.29 seconds, achieved in July 1991 in Kielce.
