= Michele Lazazzera =

Italian sprinter

Personal information
- Nationality: Italian
- Born: 24 January 1968 (age 58)

Sport
- Sport: Sprinting
- Event: 100 metres

Michele Lazazzera (born 24 January 1968) is an Italian sprinter. He competed in the men's 100 metres at the 1988 Summer Olympics.
