= Eduardo Nava (sprinter) =

Mexican sprinter (born 1968)

Personal information
- Full name: Eduardo Nava Alcántara
- Nationality: Mexican
- Born: 26 August 1968 (age 57)
- Height: 1.80 m (5 ft 11 in)
- Weight: 70 kg (154 lb)

Sport
- Sport: Sprinting
- Event: 100 metres

Eduardo Nava Alcántara (Note: In this Mexican name, the surname is Nava and the second or maternal family name is Alcántara.) (born 26 August 1968) is a former Mexican sprinter. He competed in the men's 100 metres at the 1988 Summer Olympics. Nava's son Emilio is a professional tennis player.

Competing for the Alabama Crimson Tide track and field team, Nava won the 1990 NCAA Division I Outdoor Track and Field Championships in the 4 × 100 m.
