= Ade Mafe =

English sprinter

Personal information
- Nationality: British (English)
- Born: 12 November 1966 (age 59) Isleworth, London, England
- Height: 185 cm (6 ft 1 in)
- Weight: 77 kg (170 lb)

Sport
- Sport: Athletics
- Event: Sprints
- Club: London Irish
Medal record
Athletics
Representing England
Commonwealth Games
Bronze medal – third place	1990 Auckland	200 m

Adeoye Olubunmi Mafe (born 12 November 1966) is an English male retired sprinter who competed in the 200 metres and 400 metres. At the age of 17, he represented Great Britain at the 1984 Olympic Games, reaching the 200 metres final. Also at 200 meters, he is a three-time World Indoor medallist and the 1989 European Indoor champion. After retiring from athletics, he went on to work as a fitness coach for several association football clubs.

== Biography ==
=== Athletics career ===
Mafe was born in Isleworth, London. The year after his Olympic appearance, he became the British 200 metres champion after winning the British AAA Championships title at the 1985 AAA Championships.

He won the gold medal at the 1989 European Indoor Championships in 20.92; silver at the 1985 IAAF World Indoor Games in 20.96 and a silver at the 1989 World Indoor Championships in 20.87. He represented England and won a bronze medal in the 200 metres event, at the 1990 Commonwealth Games in Auckland, New Zealand, in 20.26 (w). He reached the final of 200 metres at the 1984 Olympic Games, where he finished eighth.

Mafe is a member of the British team which set the world indoor record for the rarely contested 4 × 200 metres relay on 3 March 1991 in Glasgow. Mafe and his teammates Darren Braithwaite, Linford Christie and John Regis ran a time of 1:22.11, which has yet to be bettered.

Mafe is also a member of the team which holds the British outdoor record for the 4 × 200 metres relay. Mafe and Marcus Adam, Linford Christie and John Regis set a time of 1:22.99 in Birmingham on 23 June 1989.

=== Football career ===
In 1996 Mafe was signed by Ruud Gullit and Chelsea Football Club to coach the players fitness and training, the Chelsea players fitness was improved under Mafe so much that they won the FA Cup and went on to achieve great things.

In July 2008, Roberto Di Matteo was appointed as the new manager of the Milton Keynes Dons and Mafe was appointed fitness coach at MK Dons to work alongside Di Matteo and his assistant Eddie Newton. Mafe followed Di Matteo to West Bromwich Albion in June 2009.

On 6 February 2011, Mafe left West Bromwich Albion when Roberto Di Matteo was relieved of his duties at the club. Mafe joined the coaching staff at Watford F.C. in October 2012, linking up with Gianfranco Zola whom he knew from his time at Chelsea. He left Watford in July 2013.

On 8 January 2019 Ade appeared on The Chase.

== Personal life ==
Born in England, Mafe is of Nigerian descent.

== Achievements ==
Year	Competition	Venue	Position	Event	Notes
Representing Great Britain
1984	European Indoor Championships	Gothenburg, Sweden	2nd	200 m	21.34
1984	Olympic Games	Los Angeles, United States	8th	200 m	20.85
1985	World Indoor Championships	Paris, France	2nd	200 m	20.96
1989	European Indoor Championships	The Hague, Netherlands	1st	200 m	20.92
1989	World Indoor Championships	Budapest, Hungary	2nd	200 m	20.87
1991	World Indoor Championships	Seville, Spain	3rd	200 m	20.92
1992	European Indoor Championships	Genoa, Italy	6th	400 m	47.33
1993	World Championships	Stuttgart, Germany	10th (heats)	4 × 400 m relay	3:02.15
Representing England
1990	Commonwealth Games	Auckland, New Zealand	3rd	200 m	20.26 (w)
