= Valentín Rocandio =

Spanish sprinter

Personal information
- Full name: Valentín Rocandio Cilveti
- Nationality: Spanish
- Born: 29 June 1963 (age 63) San Sebastián, Spain

Sport
- Sport: Sprinting
- Event: 4 × 100 metres relay
Medal record
Representing Spain
Mediterranean Games
Silver medal – second place	1987 Latakia	4x100m relay

Valentín Rocandio Cilveti (born 29 June 1963) is a Spanish sprinter. He competed in the men's 4 × 100 metres relay at the 1988 Summer Olympics.
