= Derrick Florence =

American sprinter (born 1968)

Personal information
- Nationality: American
- Born: June 19, 1968 (age 58) Galveston, Texas

Sport
- Sport: Running

Achievements and titles
- Personal best(s): 100m: 10.13; 200m: 21.12
Medal record
Men's athletics
Representing the United States
World Junior Championships
Gold medal – first place	1986 Athens	100 m
Silver medal – second place	1986 Athens	200 m

Derrick Florence (born June 19, 1968) is a former American sprinter. He had an outstanding career at Ball High School in Galveston, Texas, in the mid-1980s before fading into obscurity. Florence won the gold medal in the 100 metres at the 1986 World Junior Championships and was named "High School Boys Athlete of the Year" by Track & Field News. That same season, he won the Texas high school class 5A state championship in the 200 meters in 20.5, well ahead of future world record holder Michael Johnson (21.3).

Competing for the Texas A&M Aggies track and field team, Florence won the 1988 NCAA Division I Outdoor Track and Field Championships in the 4 × 100 m.

Awards
Preceded by Roy Martin	Track & Field News High School Boys Athlete of the Year; 1986	Succeeded by Kamy Keshmiri
