= Mohamed Fahd Al-Bishi =

Saudi Arabian sprinter

Personal information
- Nationality: Saudi Arabian
- Born: 1 September 1965 (age 60)

Sport
- Sport: Sprinting
- Event: 100 metres

Mohamed Fahd Al-Bishi (born 1 September 1965) is a Saudi Arabian sprinter. He competed in the men's 100 metres at the 1988 Summer Olympics.
