= 2017 Spanish Indoor Athletics Championships =

- Dates: 18–19 February
- Host city: Salamanca
- Venue: Pista Cubierta de Atletismo Carlos Gil Pérez
- Events: 26

The 2017 Spanish Indoor Athletics Championships was the 53rd edition of the annual indoor track and field competition organised by the Royal Spanish Athletics Federation (RFEA), which serves as the Spanish national indoor championship for the sport. A total of 26 events (divided evenly between the sexes) were contested over two days on 18 and 19 February at the Pista Cubierta de Atletismo Carlos Gil Pérez in Salamanca, Castile y León.

Orlando Ortega equalled the championship record of 7.52 in the semi-finals of the men's 60 metres hurdles.

== Results ==
=== Men ===
Event	Gold		Silver		Bronze	
60 metres	Ángel David Rodríguez; F.C. Barcelona	6.69	Mario López Moure; At. Numantino	6.72 PB	David Alejandro Castro; Vel Salamanca	6.78 PB
200 metres	Daniel Rodríguez Serrano; Playas de Castellón	21.01 PB	Daniel Cerdán García; C.A. Torrent	21.25	Manuel de Nicolás; Playas de Castellón	21.30
400 metres	Óscar Husillos; F.C. Barcelona	45.92 NR	Samuel García; Playas de Castellón	46.35 PB	Lucas Búa; F.C. Barcelona	46.94
800 metres	Kevin López; C.D. Nike Running	1:49.23	Álvaro de Arriba; F.C. Barcelona	1:49.38	Daniel Andújar; Playas de Castellón	1:49.82
1500 metres	Marc Alcalá; F.C. Barcelona	3:52.38	Adel Mechaal; New Balance Team	3:52.81	Llorenç Sales; F.C. Barcelona	3:53.57
3000 metres	Adel Mechaal; New Balance Team	8:19.57	Jesús Ramos Reviejo; A.A. Moratalaz	8:20.24	Fernando Carro; Suanzes San Blas	8:20.49
60 m hurdles	Orlando Ortega; Independent	7.61	Arnau Erta; F.C. Barcelona	7.96 =PB	Luis Salort; Correr el Garbí	7.98
High jump	Miguel Ángel Sancho; Playas de Castellón	2.19 m	Simón Siverio; Tenerife Caja Canarias	2.17 m	Lysvanys Artlys Pérez; S.G. Pontevedra	2.14 m
Pole vault	Igor Bychkov; Playas de Castellón	5.35 m	Didac Salas; F.C. Barcelona	5.25 m	Eloy Guimerá; C.A. Fent Camí Mislata	5.25 m
Long jump	Eusebio Cáceres; Independent	7.98 m	Jean Marie Okutu; F.C. Barcelona	7.76 m	Fernando Ramos Arqués; Playas de Castellón	7.58 m
Triple jump	Pablo Torrijos; Playas de Castellón	16.70 m	José Emilio Bellido; Playas de Castellón	16.30 m	Íñigo Uribarren; Real Sociedad	16.17 m PB
Shot put	Carlos Tobalina; F.C. Barcelona	20.32 m	Borja Vivas; At. Málaga	20.26 m	Alejandro Noguera; Playas de Castellón	18.48 m
Heptathlon	Mario Arancón; At. Numantino	5692 pts PB	Jonay Jordán; Tenerife Caja Canarias	5673 pts PB	Vicente Guardiola; UCAM Cartagena	5381 pts

=== Women ===
Event	Gold		Silver		Bronze	
60 metres	Cristina Lara; F.C. Barcelona	7.40	María Isabel Pérez; Valencia Esports	7.53	Sheila Cubas; Tenerife Caja Canarias	7.54
200 metres	Paula Sevilla; Playas de Castellón	23.99	Jaël Bestué; Muntanyenc S. Cugat	24.01 PB	Paloma Díez Cañete; Playas de Castellón	24.15
400 metres	Laura Bueno; Valencia Esports	53.38 PB	Aauri Bokesa; C.D. Nike Running	53.75	Carmen Sánchez Silva; F.C. Barcelona	54.22 PB
800 metres	Esther Guerrero; New Balance Team	2:03.36	Natalia Romero; Unicaja Atletismo	2:06.41	María del Mar Casillas; Playas de Castellón	2:10.21 PB
1500 metres	Solange Pereira; Valencia Esports	4:32.49	Marta Pérez; Valencia Esports	4:33.40	Lucía Rodríguez Montero; Playas de Castellón	4:34.67
3000 metres	Blanca Fernández de la Granja; F.C. Barcelona	9:09.47	Ana Lozano; Dental Seoane Pampín	9:11.29	Maitane Melero; Grupompleo Pamplona	9:17.55 PB
60 m hurdles	Caridad Jerez; F.C. Barcelona	8.11	Teresa Errandonea; Super Amara BAT	8.25 PB	Nora Orduña; At. San Sebastián	8.47
High jump	Ruth Beitia; Torralbo's Team	1.96 m	Saleta Fernández; Valencia Esports	1.82 m	Cristina Ferrando; Playas de Castellón	1.79 m
Pole vault	Malen Ruiz de Azúa; Super Amara BAT	4.16 m	Carla Franch; F.C. Barcelona	4.11 m	Maialen Axpe; At. San Sebastián Meritxell Benito; Playas de Castellón	4.11 m
Long jump	Juliet Itoya; A.D. Marathon	6.51 m PB	María del Mar Jover; Valencia Esports	6.31 m	Olatz Arrieta; F.C. Barcelona	6.29 m PB
Triple jump	Ana Peleteiro; C.A. Adidas	13.67 m	Patricia Sarrapio; Playas de Castellón	13.34 m	Andrea Calleja Sánchez; F.C. Barcelona	13.11 m
Shot put	Úrsula Ruiz; Valencia Esports	16.83 m	María Belén Toimil; Playas de Castellón	16.27 m PB	Elena Gutiérrez; F.C. Barcelona	14.56 m
Pentathlon	Andrea Medina; A.D. Marathon	4076 pts PB	Yanira Soto; Tenerife Caja Canarias	4070 pts	Paola Sarabia; Tenerife Caja Canarias	4015 pts
