= 2016 Spanish Athletics Championships =

- Dates: 23–24 July 2016
- Host city: Gijón, Spain
- Venue: Las Mestas Sports Complex
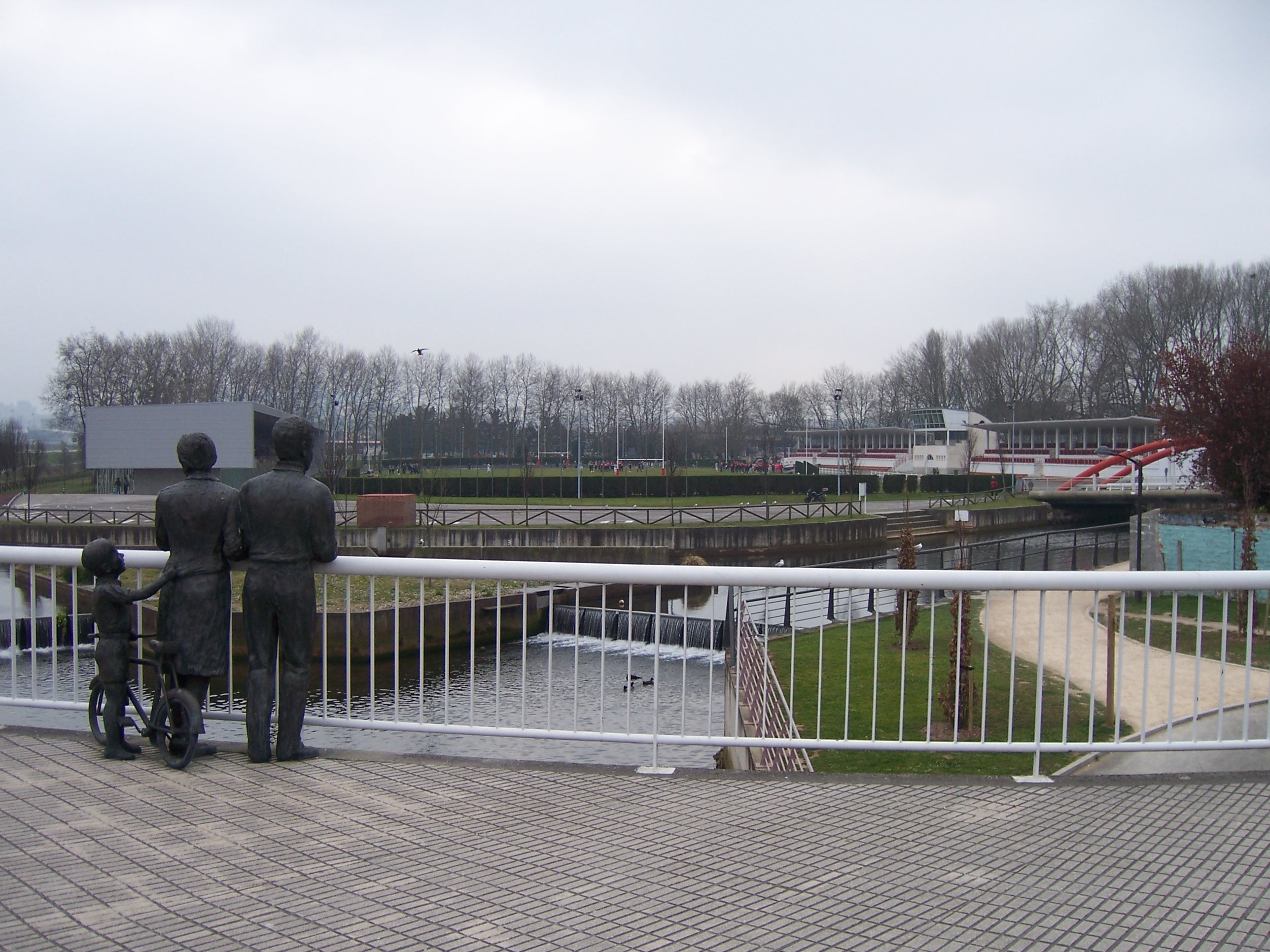

The 2016 Spanish Athletics Championships was the 96th edition of the national championship in outdoor track and field for Spain. It was held on 23 and 24 July at the Las Mestas Sports Complex in Gijón. It served as the selection meeting for Spain at the 2016 European Athletics Championships.

The club championships in relays and combined track and field events were contested separately from the main competition.

== Results ==
=== Men ===
Event	Gold		Silver		Bronze	
100 metres	Ángel David Rodríguez; FC Barcelona	10.39	David Alejandro; VelSalamanca Run-Go	10.48	Mauro Triana; Playas de Castellón	10.49
200 metres	Óscar Husillos; A.D.Marathon	20.83 w	Ángel David Rodríguez; FC Barcelona	20.95 w	Mauro Triana; Playas de Castellón	20.97 w
400 metres	Lucas Búa; FC Barcelona	46.36	Samuel García; Tenerife CajaCanarias	46.65	Luis Vallejo; Playas de Castellón	47.05
800 metres	Álvaro de Arriba; CA. Fent Cami Mislata	1:50.18	Daniel Andújar; Playas de Castellón	1:50.26	David Palacio; CA. Fent Cami Mislata	1:50.53
1500 metres	Marc Alcalá; FC Barcelona	3:51.04	Adel Mechaal; New Balance Team	3:51.23	Mauris Surel Castillo; Playas de Castellón	3:51.29
5000 metres	Ilias Fifa; FC Barcelona	13:38.22	Antonio Abadía Beci; CD. Nike Running	13:38.50	Adel Mechaal; New Balance Team	13:39.17
110 m hurdles	Orlando Ortega; C.A. Vall Albaida	13.09 CR	Yidiel Islay Contreras; Playas de Castellón	13.45	Javier Colomo; Ederki-Caja Rural	13.85
400 m hurdles	Sergio Fernández Roda; Grupompleo Pamplona Atlético	50.21	Javier Delgado Osorio; FC Barcelona	50.74	Diego Cabello Miñón; Playas de Castellón	51.33
3000 m s'chase	Sebastián Martos; C.D.Nike Running	8:37.63	Fernando Carro; New Balance Team	8:38.54	Eric Peñalver; Playas de Castellón	8:39.24
High jump	Miguel Ángel Sancho; Playas de Castellón	2.23 m	Simón Siverio; Tenerife CajaCanarias	2.14 m	Juan Ignacio López; CA. Fent Cami Mislata	2.10 m
Pole vault	Igor Bychkov; Playas de Castellón	5.51 m	Didac Salas; FC Barcelona	5.46 m	Adrián Vallés; Grupompleo Pamplona Atlético	5.36 m
Long jump	Jean Marie Okutu; FC Barcelona	7.65 m	Daniel Solis; A.D.Marathon	7.48 m	Carlos Sánchez Juan; Centre Esp. Colivenc	7.46 m
Triple jump	José Alfonso Palomares; FC Barcelona	15.96 m	Pablo Cid; Real Sociedad	15.89 m	José Emilio Bellido; Playas de Castellón	15.75 m
Shot put	Borja Vivas; Atl. Málaga	20.59	Carlos Tobalina; FC Barcelona	20.06 m	Alejandro Noguera; Playas de Castellón	18.03 m
Discus throw	Frank Casañas; Playas de Castellón	61.25 m	Mario Pestano; Tenerife CajaCanarias	60.78 m	Lois Maikel Martínez; Playas de Castellón	59.75 m
Hammer throw	Javier Cienfuegos; Playas de Castellón	72.92 m	Pedro José Martín; FC Barcelona	69.85 m	Miguel Alberto Blanco; FC Barcelona	68.98 m
Javelin throw	Nicolás Quijera; Grupompleo Pamplona Atlético	75.86 m	Jordi Sánchez; FC Barcelona	72.63 m	Manuel Uriz; CA. Fent Cami Mislata	71.21 m
Decathlon	Jorge Ureña; Playas de Castellón	7900 pts	Jonay Jordán; Tenerife CajaCanarias	7433 pts	Pablo Trescoli; Playas de Castellón	7202 pts
10,000 m walk	Miguel Ángel López Nicolás; UCAM Murcia	38:06.28	Álvaro Martín; Playas de Castellón	39:23.51	Luis Alberto Amezcua; Juventud Guadix	39:29.00
4 × 100 m relay	FC Barcelona; Denis Galán; Arnau Erta; Borja Zorrilla-Lequerica; Ángel David Rodríguez	40.62	Playas de Castellón; Chinedu Patrick Ike (NGR); Mauro Triana; Alberto Gavaldá; Daniel Rodríguez	40.65	Real Sociedad; Imanol Gil; Octavian Mihail Romanescu (ROM); Orkatz Beitia; David Arqués	41.08
4 × 400 m relay	FC Barcelona; Pau Fradera; Javier Delgado; Guillermo Rojo; Lucas Búa	3:09.17	Playas de Castellón; Luis Vallejo; Diego Cabello; David Jiménez; Alejandro Estévez	3:10.89	Grupompleo Pamplona At. Óscar Urdanoz; Kevin Cristian Pérez; Saúl Martínez; Sergio Fernández	3:11.64

=== Women ===
Event	Gold		Silver		Bronze	
100 metres	Estela García; Valencia Terra i Mar	11.41 CR	María Isabel Pérez; Valencia Terra i Mar	11.60	Alazne Furundarena; Atlético San Sebastián	11.77
200 metres	Cristina Lara; FC Barcelona	23.60	Carmen Sánchez Silva; FC Barcelona	24.02	Sonia Molina; Simply-Scorpio 71	24.09
400 metres	Aauri Bokesa; C.D. Nike Running	53.44	Laura Bueno; A.D.Marathon	53.82	Geraxane Ussia; FC Barcelona	53.87
800 metres	Esther Guerrero; New Balance Team	2:01.72	Isabel Macías; Simply-Scorpio 71	2:06.46	Natalia Romero; Unicaja Atletismo Jaén	2:07.68
1500 metres	Marta Pérez Miguel; C. Dental Seoane Pampín	4:12.74	Solange Pereira; Valencia Terra i Mar	4:14.32	Montse Mas; FC Barcelona	4:15.54
5000 metres	Trihas Gebre; Bilbao Atletismo	16:02.12	Zulema Fuentes-Pila; Bilbao Atletismo	16:11.49	Esther Navarrete; At. Femenino Celta	16:11.85
100 m hurdles	Caridad Jerez; FC Barcelona	13.15	Marta Sainz; A.D.Marathon	14.08	Teresa Errandonea; Súper Amara BAT	14.10
400 m hurdles	Maryia Roshchyn; Playas de Castellón	59.68	Sonia Nasarre; ISS-L´Hospitalet	1:00.39	Laura Natalí Sotomayor; Valencia Terra i Mar	1:00.85
3000 m s'chase	María José Pérez; C. Dental Seoane Pampín	9:50.45	Irene Sánchez-Escribano; C. Dental Seoane Pampín	9:56.14	Carolina Robles; A.D.Marathon	9:59.18
High jump	Ruth Beitia; Torralbo´s Team	1.90 m	Cristina Ferrando; Playas de Castellón	1.81 m	Claudia García; FC Barcelona	1.76 m
Pole vault	Naroa Aguirre Kamio; Atlético San Sebastián	4.32 m	Carla Franch; FC Barcelona	4.27 m	Anna María Pinero; Valencia Terra i Mar	4.17 m
Long jump	Juliet Itoya; A.D.Marathon	6.51 m	Concepción Montaner; Playas de Castellón	6.20 m	Olatz Arrieta; FC Barcelona	6.17 m
Triple jump	Patricia Sarrapio; Playas de Castellón	13.66 m	Débora Calveras; FC Barcelona	13.20 m	Andrea Calleja; FC Barcelona	13.10 m
Shot put	Úrsula Ruiz; Valencia Terra i Mar	17.24 m	María Belén Toimil; Playas de Castellón	16.10 m	Elena Gutiérrez; Piélagos	14.86 m
Discus throw	Sabina Asenjo; FC Barcelona	58.20 m	Andrea Alarcón; A.A.Catalunya	52.73 m	June Kintana; Grupompleo Pamplona Atlético	52.03 m
Hammer throw	Berta Castells; Valencia Terra i Mar	69.41 m	Laura Redondo; FC Barcelona	67.40 m	María Barbaño Acevedo; A.D.Marathon	61.62 m
Javelin throw	Lidia Parada; Atlética Barbanza	57.18 m	Nora Aida Bicet; Valencia Terra i Mar	54.54 m	Estefanía López; Valencia Terra i Mar	51.82 m
Heptathlon	Andrea Medina; A.D.Marathon	5641 pts	Estefanía Fortes; A.A.Catalunya	5555 pts	Yanira Soto; Tenerife CajaCanarias	5412 pts
10,000 m walk	Raquel González; FC Barcelona	42:14.12 NR	Beatriz Pascual; Valencia Terra i Mar	42:35.69	Júlia Takács; Playas de Castellón	43:55.70
4 × 100 m relay	FC Barcelona; Jaël Bestué; Carmen Sánchez Silva; Caridad Jerez; Cristina Lara	45.04	Valencia Terra i Mar; Fátima Diame; Estela García; Cristina Castellar; María Isabel Pérez	45.65	A.D.Marathon; Jessica Alloza; Sandra Pérez; Paula Soria; Elisa Tejedor	47.18
4 × 400 m relay	Playas de Castellón; Sara Gómez; Herminia Parra; Bárbara Camblor; Elena Moreno	3:41.50	A.D.Marathon; Ruth Peña; Carolina Pacheco; Lucía Marín; Laura Bueno	3:42.31	ISS-L´Hospitalet; Sara Gallego; María Stephanie Thomas (GBR); Neus Camins; Sonia Nasarre	3:46.85

== Medal table ==
#	Club	Gold	Silver	Bronze	Total
1	FC Barcelona	13	10	6	29
2	Playas de Castellón	8	8	11	27
3	Valencia Terra i Mar	3	5	3	11
4	A. D. Marathon	3	4	3	10
5	C.D. Nike Running	2	1	0	3
5	Clínica Dental Seoane Pampín	2	1	0	3
7	Grupompleo Pamplona At.	2	0	3	5
8	New Balance Team	1	2	1	4
9	Bilbao Atletismo	1	1	0	2
10	Fent Cami Mislata	1	0	3	4
11	Atlético San Sebastián	1	0	1	2
12	Atlética Barbanza	1	0	0	1
12	Atl. Málaga	1	0	0	1
12	C.A. Vall Albaida	1	0	0	1
12	Torralbo´s Team	1	0	0	1
12	UCAM Murcia	1	0	0	1
17	Tenerife CajaCanarias	0	4	1	5
18	A.A.Catalunya	0	2	0	2
19	ISS-L´Hospitalet	0	1	1	2
19	Real Sociedad	0	1	1	2
19	Simply-Scorpio 71	0	1	1	2
22	VelSalamanca Run-Go	0	1	0	1
23	Súper Amara Bat	0	0	1	1
23	At. Femenino Celta	0	0	1	1
23	Centre Esp. Colivenc	0	0	1	1
23	Ederki-Caja Rural	0	0	1	1
23	Unicaja Atletismo Jaén	0	0	1	1
23	Juventud Guadix	0	0	1	1
23	Piélagos	0	0	1	1
TOTAL		42	42	42	126
