= 2017 Spanish Athletics Championships =

- Dates: 22–23 July 2017
- Host city: Barcelona, Spain
- Venue: Estadio Joan Serrahima
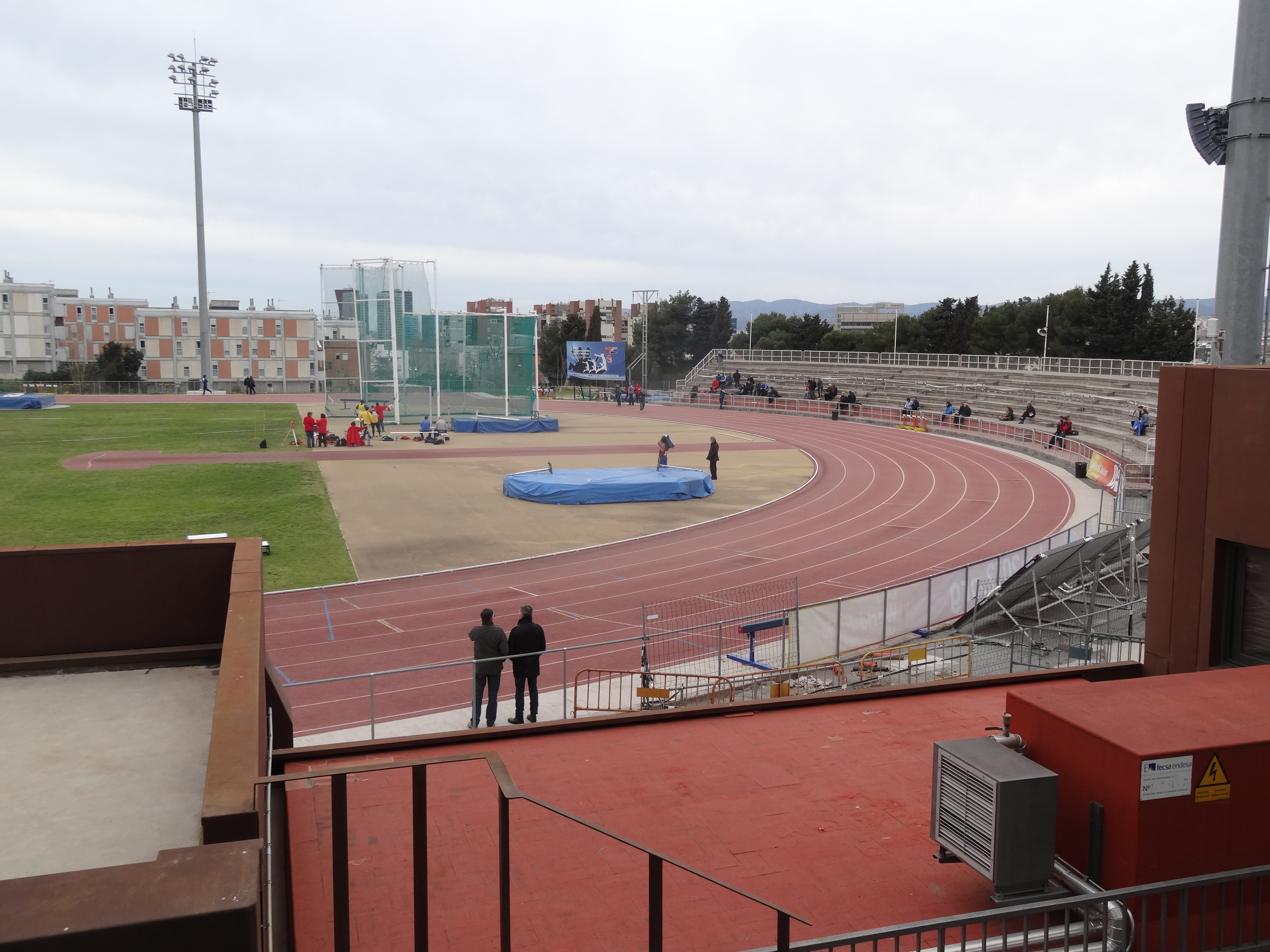

The 97th edition of the Spanish Athletics Championships was held on 22–23 July 2017 at the Estadio Joan Serrahima in Barcelona. It served as the selection meeting for Spain at the 2017 World Championships in Athletics.

The club championships in relays and combined track and field events were contested separately from the main competition.

== Results ==
=== Men ===
Event	Gold		Silver		Bronze	
100 metres (wind: +0.7 m/s)	Ángel David Rodríguez; F.C. Barcelona	10.24	Eusebio Cáceres; Independent	10.60	Orkatz Beitia; Real Sociedad	10.61
200 metres (wind: +0.6 m/s)	Samuel García; Playas de Castellón	20.59 PB	Daniel Cerdán; C.A. Torrent	21.05 PB	Daniel Rodríguez Serrano; Playas de Castellón	21.33
400 metres	Óscar Husillos; F.C. Barcelona	45.42	Lucas Búa; F.C. Barcelona	45.90	Darwin Andres Echeverry; Tenerife Caja Canarias	46.37 PB
800 metres	Saúl Ordóñez; New Balance Team	1:47.03	Álvaro de Arriba; F.C. Barcelona	1:47.25	Kevin López; C.D. Nike Running	1:47.35
1500 metres	Adel Mechaal; New Balance Team	3:47.07	Marc Alcalá; F.C. Barcelona	3:47.43	Alberto Imedio; F.C. Barcelona	3:47.77
5000 metres	Adel Mechaal; New Balance Team	14:07.93	Ilias Fifa; F.C. Barcelona	14:11.07	Daniel Mateo Angulo; Atletismo Bikila	14:12.48
110 m hurdles (wind: -0.2 m/s)	Orlando Ortega; Independent	13.52	Javier Colomo; Grupompleo Pamplona At.	13.94	Francisco Javier López López; Playas de Castellón	14.05
400 m hurdles	Sergio Fernández Roda; New Balance Team	50.51	Mark Ujakpor; Playas de Castellón	51.05	Íñigo Rodríguez Goitia; Real Sociedad	51.54 =PB
3000 m s'chase	Sebastián Martos; C.D. Nike Running	8:29.29	Fernando Carro; Suanzes San Blas	8:30.77	Jonathan Romeo; C.A. Lloret-La Selva	8:31.36 PB
10,000 m walk	Álvaro Martín; Playas de Castellón	39:47.17	Luis Alberto Amezcua; Juventud Guadix	39:50.88	Miguel Ángel López Nicolás; UCAM Murcia	40:15.17
High jump	Carlos Rojas Lombardo; Unicaja Atletismo Miguel Ángel Sancho Rubio; Playas de Castellón Simón Siverio; Tenerife Caja Canarias	2.17 m	Not awarded			
Pole vault	Adrián Vallés Iñarrea; Grupompleo Pamplona At.	5.56 m	Igor Bychkov; Playas de Castellón	5.51 m	Istar Dapena; Real Sociedad	5.31 m
Long jump	Jean Marie Okutu; F.C. Barcelona	7.54 m (wind: +1.2 m/s)	Sergio Rípodas; Grupompleo Pamplona At.	7.46 m (wind: +0.8 m/s)	José Luis Fernández García de Zúñiga; Unicaja Atletismo	7.45 m (wind: +1.1 m/s)
Triple jump	Pablo Torrijos; Playas de Castellón	16.88 m (wind: +0.4 m/s)	Vicente Docavo; Playas de Castellón	16.54 m (wind: +1.3 m/s)	Marcos Ruiz Pérez; F.C. Barcelona	16.10 m w (wind: +2.5 m/s)
Shot put	Borja Vivas; At. Málaga	20.30 m	Carlos Tobalina; F.C. Barcelona	20.06 m	José Ángel Pinedo; Fent Camí Mislata	18.52 m
Discus throw	Frank Casañas Hernández; Independent	59.75 m	Lois Maikel Martínez; Playas de Castellón	58.71 m	Alejandro Vielva; Grupompleo Pamplona At.	56.61 m
Hammer throw	Miguel Alberto Blanco; F.C. Barcelona	70.59 m	Kevin Arreaga; Playas de Castellón	66.55 m	Pedro José Martín Cazalilla; F.C. Barcelona	66.47 m
Javelin throw	Odei Jainaga; Deportivo Eibar	73.50 m	Nicolás Quijera; Grupompleo Pamplona At.	73.41 m	Pablo Bugallo; Playas de Castellón	68.28 m
Decathlon	Vicente Guardiola; UCAM Cartagena	7367 pts PB	Mario Arancón; At. Numantino	7346 pts	Javier Pérez Rasines; Tenerife Caja Canarias	6987 pts
4 × 100 m relay	Playas de Castellón Club de Atletismo; Francisco Javier López López; Yunier Pérez; Arian Olmos Téllez; Chinedu Patrick Ike	40.55	Real Sociedad de Atletismo; Octavian Romanescu; Orkatz Beitia; Alberto Muñoz Alonso; David Arqués	40.64	Agrupación Deportiva Marathon; Íñigo Sagaz; Álvaro Plaza; Daniel Quero; Alejandro Lozano Burón	40.68
4 × 400 m relay	Fútbol Club Barcelona; Óscar Husillos; Guillermo Rojo Gil; Pau Fradera; Lucas Búa	3:09.77	Playas de Castellón Club de Atletismo; Alberto Gavaldá; Alejandro Estévez; David Jiménez Herrera; Mark Ujakpor	3:12.00	Agrupación Deportiva Marathon; Ryan Wallis; Adrián Parra; Julio Arenas; Jesús Pérez Ferreras	3:12.19

=== Women ===
Event	Gold		Silver		Bronze	
100 metres (wind: +1.9 m/s)	Cristina Lara Pérez; F.C. Barcelona	11.40 CR	Alazne Furundarena; At. San Sebastián	11.66 PB	María Isabel Pérez; Valencia Esports	11.75
200 metres (wind: -0.1 m/s)	Estela García Villalta; Valencia Esports	23.63	Paula Sevilla; Playas de Castellón	23.95	Nana Jacob; Tenerife Caja Canarias	24.14
400 metres	Laura Bueno; Valencia Sports	53.63	Carmen Sánchez Silva; F.C. Barcelona	54.02	Elena Moreno; Valencia Esports	54.52
800 metres	Esther Guerrero; New Balance Team	2:03.58	Natalia Romero; Unicaja Atletismo	2:05.39	Zoya Naumov; A.A. Catalunya	2:06.75
1500 metres	Solange Pereira; Valencia Esports	4:40.55	Marta Pérez Miguel; Valencia Esports	4:40.78	Blanca Fernández de la Granja; F.C. Barcelona	4:41.69
5000 metres	Ana Lozano; Dental Seoane Pampín	16:02.27	Maitane Melero; Grupompleo Pamplona At.	16:07.73 PB	Trihas Gebre; Bilbao At.	16:30.20
100 m hurdles (wind: -0.4 m/s)	María Mújika; At. San Sebastián	13.51 PB	Teresa Errandonea; Super Amara BAT	13.53	Alba Manzano; A.A. Catalunya	14.10 =PB
400 m hurdles	Sara Gallego; ISS L'Hospitalet	57.88 PB	Paulette Fernández; Ría Ferrol-C. Arenal	59.41 PB	Leyre de la Rúa; Grupompleo Pamplona At.	1:00.45 PB
3000 m s'chase	Irene Sánchez-Escribano; Playas de Castellón	9:48.45	Carolina Robles; Valencia Esports	9:52.79	Teresa Urbina; F.C. Barcelona	9:58.76
10,000 m walk	Júlia Takács; Playas de Castellón	44:36.63	Lidia Sánchez-Puebla; Playas de Castellón	46:13.79	Amanda Cano Gómez; UCAM Athleo Cieza	46:26.21
High jump	Ruth Beitia; Torralbo's Team	1.86 m	Saleta Fernández; Valencia Esports	1.83 m PB	Cristina Ferrando; Playas de Castellón	1.80 m
Pole vault	Carla Franch; F.C. Barcelona	4.21 m	Maialen Axpe; At. San Sebastián	4.11 m	Malen Ruiz de Azúa; Super Amara BAT	4.11 m)
Long jump	Olatz Arrieta; F.C. Barcelona	6.43 m w (wind: +2.1 m/s)	Fátima Diame; Valencia Esports	6.34 m w (wind: +2.1 m/s)	María del Mar Jover; Valencia Esports	6.15 m (wind: +1.8 m/s)
Triple jump	Ana Peleteiro; C.A. Adidas	13.67 m (wind: +0.9 m/s)	Fátima Diame; Valencia Esports	13.36 m (wind: 0.0 m/s)	Patricia Sarrapio; Playas de Castellón	13.23 m (wind: 0.0 m/s)
Shot put	Úrsula Ruiz; Valencia Esports	18.28 m NR	María Belén Toimil; Playas de Castellón	17.19 m	Elena Gutiérrez; F.C. Barcelona	14.74 m
Discus throw	Sabina Asenjo; F.C. Barcelona	57.97 m	Andrea Alarcón; A.A. Catalunya	54.41 m	June Kintana; Grupompleo Pamplona At.	54.32 m
Hammer throw	Berta Castells Franco; Valencia Esports	67.53 m	Laura Redondo; F.C. Barcelona	67.43 m	Osarumen Odeh; Playas de Castellón	61.49 m
Javelin throw	Lidia Parada; A.A.D. Barbanza	57.97 m	Arantza Moreno; F.C. Barcelona	55.74 m	Nora Bizet; Valencia Esports	52.91 m
Heptathlon	Carmen Romero Gómez; Simply Scorpio 71	5579 pts PB	Estefanía Fortes; A.A. Catalunya	5576 pts	Andrea Medina; A.D. Marathon	5433 pts
4 × 100 m relay	Valencia Club de Atletismo; Fátima Diame; Estela García Villalta; Cristina Castellar; María Isabel Pérez	45.62	Pamplona Atlético; Yaiza Sanz; Ane Petrirena; Nerea Bermejo; Laila Lacuey	46.44	Playas de Castellón Club de Atletismo; Isabel Grau San Andrés; Esther Murcia; Paula Sevilla; Lara Gómez García	46.47
4 × 400 m relay	Valencia Club de Atletismo; Modesta Morauskaite; Elena Moreno; Solange Pereira; Laura Bueno	3:40.04	Agrupación Atlética Cataluña; Sara Dorda; Zoya Naumov; Laura Centella; Andrea Díez Ibáñez	3:47.89	Simply Scorpio 71; Laura Fernández Mora; Elisa Cortés; Laia González Call; Begoña Garrido	3:48.09
