= 2018 Spanish Athletics Championships =

- Dates: 21–22 July 2018
- Host city: Getafe, Spain
- Venue: Polideportivo Juan de la Cierva

The 2018 Spanish Athletics Championships was the 98th edition of the national championship in outdoor track and field for Spain. It was held on 21 and 22 July at the Polideportivo Juan de la Cierva in Getafe. It served as the selection meeting for Spain at the 2018 European Athletics Championships.

The club championships in relays and combined track and field events were contested separately from the main competition.

== Results ==
=== Men ===
Event	Gold		Silver		Bronze	
100 metres (wind: +1.9 m/s)	Aitor Same Ekobo; At. Fuenlabrada	10.16 PB	Patrick Chinedu Ike; Playas de Castellón	10.16 PB	Ángel David Rodríguez; F.C. Barcelona	10.17
200 metres (wind: +0.5 m/s)	Bruno Hortelano; C.D. Nike Running	20.15	Pol Retamal; F.C. Barcelona	20.83	Daniel Rodríguez Serrano; Playas de Castellón	20.85
400 metres	Óscar Husillos; F.C. Barcelona	45.22	Lucas Búa; F.C. Barcelona	45.45	Samuel García; Playas de Castellón	45.48
800 metres	Álvaro de Arriba; F.C. Barcelona	1:48.83	Saúl Ordóñez; New Balance Team	1:49.19	Daniel Andújar; Playas de Castellón	1:49.30
1500 metres	Jesús Gómez Santiago; C.D. Nike Running	3:38.67	Adel Mechaal; New Balance Team	3:39.98	Adrián Ben; F.C. Barcelona	3:40.09
5000 metres	Toni Abadía; Nike Internacional	13:44.38	Adel Mechaal; New Balance Team	13:45.14	Juan Antonio Pérez; Cárnicas Serrano	13:52.23
110 m hurdles (wind: 0.0 m/s)	Orlando Ortega; C.A. Adidas	13.32	Yidiel Contreras; Playas de Castellón	13.46	Francisco Javier López López; Playas de Castellón	13.87
400 m hurdles	Sergio Fernández Roda; New Balance Team	49.28	Aleix Porras; F.C. Barcelona	50.54 PB	David Pineda; At. Numantino	50.82
3000 m s'chase	Fernando Carro; Añares Rioja	8:29.79	Daniel Arce Ibáñez; Universidad de Burgos	8:33.77	Sebastián Martos; C.D. Nike Running	8:35.00
10.000 m walk	Álvaro Martín; Playas de Castellón	39:31.72	Alberto Amezcua; D.J.A. Guadix	39:50.85	Miguel Ángel López Nicolás; UCAM Murcia	40:17.08
High jump	Alexis Sastre; Playas de Castellón Carlos Rojas Lombardo; Unicaja Atletismo Juan Ignacio López; F.C. Barcelona	2.17 m	Not awarded			
Pole vault	Adrián Vallés Iñarrea; Grupompleo Pamplona At.	5.45 m	Didac Salas; F.C. Barcelona	5.40 m	Igor Bychkov; Playas de Castellón	5.35 m
Long jump	Jean Marie Okutu; F.C. Barcelona	8.01 m (wind: +0.1 m/s)	Javier Cobián; At. Gijonés Fumeru	7.78 m PB (wind: -0.2 m/s)	Héctor Santos Llorente; F.C. Barcelona	7.77 m (wind: +0.1 m/s)
Triple jump	Pablo Torrijos; Playas de Castellón	17.23 m w (wind: +2.2 m/s)	Marcos Ruiz Pérez; F.C. Barcelona	16.70 m (wind: +1.0 m/s)	Vicente Docavo; Playas de Castellón	16.50 m (wind: +1.7 m/s)
Shot put	Carlos Tobalina; F.C. Barcelona	19.97 m	Daniel Pardo González; A.D. Marathon	18.82 m PB	José Ángel Pinedo; C.A. Fent Camí Mislata	18.68 m
Discus throw	Lois Maikel Martínez; Playas de Castellón	58.85 m	Frank Casañas Hernández; Independiente	56.97 m	Alejandro Vielva; Grupompleo Pamplona At.	54.93 m
Hammer throw	Javier Cienfuegos; Playas de Castellón	76.10 m	Alberto González Moyano; Unicaja Atletismo	72.87 m	Pedro José Martín; F.C. Barcelona	70.90 m
Javelin throw	Nicolás Quijera; Grupompleo Pamplona At.	75.64 m	Manu Quijera; Grupompleo Pamplona At.	75.41 m PB	Manuel Castellanos Franco; A.D. Marathon	69.64 m PB
Decathlon	Mario Arancón; At. Numantino	7480 pts	Pablo Trescolí; Playas de Castellón	7238 pts	Jesús Castillo Patiño; Cornellá At.	7194 pts
4 × 100 m relay	F.C. Barcelona; Joel Ferrando; Ángel David Rodríguez; Pol Retamal; Óscar Husillos	39.44 CR	A.D. Marathon; Alejandro Lozano Burón; Álvaro Plaza; Daniel Quero Moreno; Marco Antonio Palella	40.12	Simply Scorpio 71; Ricardo Flor Rodríguez; Daniel Mazón Toledo; Javier Ocaña de la Fuente; Jonathan Okeudo Nmaju	40.48
4 × 400 m relay	Playas de Castellón; Alberto Gavaldá; Daniel Andújar; David Jiménez Herrera; Mark Ujakpor	3:10.62	Real Sociedad; Adrián Rocandio; Christian Barbero; Unai Mena Ortega; Gen Esteban San Millán	3:12.36	A.D. Marathon; Miguel Camarena; Ignacio Laguna; Adrián Parra Lafuente; Álvaro Plaza	3:12.43

=== Women ===
Event	Gold		Silver		Bronze	
100 metres (wind: +3.8 m/s)	María Isabel Pérez; Valencia Esports	11.17 w	Cristina Lara Pérez; F.C. Barcelona	11.20 w	Bianca Acosta; Simply Scorpio 71	11.60 w
200 metres (wind: +1.0 m/s)	Jaël Bestué; F.C. Barcelona	23.31 CR	Paula Sevilla; Playas de Castellón	23.44	Nana Jacob; Tenerife Caja Canarias	23.64
400 metres	Laura Bueno; Valencia C.A.	52.17 PB	Aauri Bokesa; C.D. Nike Running	53.12	Carmen Sánchez Silva; F.C. Barcelona	53.85
800 metres	Zoya Naumov; A.A. Catalunya	2:07.84	Natalia Romero; Unicaja Atletismo	2:08.05	Adriana Cagigas; Unicaja Atletismo	2:08.57
1500 metres	Marta Pérez Miguel; Valencia Esports	4:10.63	Esther Guerrero; New Balance Team	4:11.43	Solange Pereira; Valencia Esports	4:16.30
5000 metres	Maitane Melero; Grupompleo Pamplona At.	16:09.78	Ester Navarrete; F.C. Barcelona	16:13.84	Nuria Lugueros; Piélagos	16:19.24
100 m hurdles (wind: -0.4 m/s)	Caridad Jerez; F.C. Barcelona	13.41	Teresa Errandonea; Super Amara BAT	13.69	Paula Raúl; Avinent Manresa	13.72
400 m hurdles	Sara Gallego; ISS L'Hospitalet	57.85	Carmen Romero Gómez; Simply Scorpio 71	59.23 PB	Paulette Fernández; Ría Ferrol-C. Arenal	59.48
3000 m s'chase	Irene Sánchez-Escribano; Playas de Castellón	9:57.87	María José Pérez Moreno; Valencia Esports	10:02.28	Clara Viñaras; Bidasoa At. Taldea	10:10.99
10.000 m walk	Raquel González Campos; F.C. Barcelona	43:37.95	Laura García-Caro; At. Ciudad de Lepe	43:50.25 PB	María Pérez García; Valencia Esports	44:33.03
High jump	Raquel Álvarez Polo; At. Numantino	1.79 m	Izaskun Turrillas; Grupompleo Pamplona At.	1.76 m	Cristina Ferrando; Playas de Castellón; 1.76 m	
Pole vault	Mónica Clemente; Avinent Manresa	4.45 m	Maialen Axpe; At. San Sebastián	4.45 m	Malen Ruiz de Azúa; Super Amara BAT	4.35 m
Long jump	Juliet Itoya; Independiente	6.80 m PB (wind: +1.3 m/s)	Fátima Diame; Valencia Esports	6.43 m (wind: +0.4 m/s)	Leticia Gil Pérez; Simply Scorpio 71	6.25 m w. (wind: +2.9 m/s)
Triple jump	Ana Peleteiro; C.A. Adidas	14.55 m CR (wind: -0.2 m/s)	Patricia Sarrapio; Playas de Castellón	13.91 m (wind: +0.1 m/s)	María Vicente; ISS L'Hospitalet	13.67 m (wind: -0.2 m/s)
Shot put	Úrsula Ruiz; Valencia Esports	16.21 m	María Belén Toimil; Playas de Castellón	15.77 m	Elena Gutiérrez; F.C. Barcelona	15.27 m
Discus throw	Sabina Asenjo; F.C. Barcelona	55.99 m	June Kintana; Grupompleo Pamplona At.	55.98 m	Mar Morant; At. Safor-Delikia Sports	51.69 m PB
Hammer throw	Berta Castells Franco; Valencia Esports	68.21 m	Osarumen Odeh; Playas de Castellón	63.68 m	Laura Redondo; F.C. Barcelona	63.55 m
Javelin throw	Lidia Parada; A.A.D. Barbanza	61.25 m CR	Arantza Moreno; F.C. Barcelona	55.66 m	Mercedes Chilla; Valencia Esports	52.61 m
Heptathlon	Patricia Ortega Trincado; At. San Sebastián	5709 pts	Bárbara Hernando; Playas de Castellón	5649 pts	Tamara del Río; A.A. Catalunya	5241 pts
4 × 100 m relay	Playas de Castellón; Isabel Shili Grau San Andrés; Lara Gómez García; Paula Sevilla; Narcisa Landazuri	44.64	Valencia Esports; Fátima Diame; Carmen Marco Mora; María Isabel Pérez; Modesta Morauskaite	44.77	F.C. Barcelona; Ingrid Andrés Bocanegra; Caridad Jerez; Jaël Bestué; Cristina Lara Pérez	44.98
4 × 400 m relay	Valencia Esports; Elena Moreno; Modesta Morauskaite; Solange Pereira; Laura Bueno	3:36.38 CR	Playas de Castellón; Sara Gómez Álvarez; Bárbara Camblor; Andrea Jiménez Hernández; Herminia Parra Morales	3:38.47	A.A. Catalunya; Sara Dorda; Zoya Naumov; Laura Centella; Andrea Díez Ibáñez	3:39.57
