= 2015 Spanish Athletics Championships =

- Dates: 1–2 August 2015
- Host city: Castellón de la Plana, Spain
- Venue: Pista Municipal Gaetá Huguet

The 2015 Spanish Athletics Championships was the 95th edition of the national championship in outdoor track and field for Spain. It was held on 1 and 2 August at the Pista Municipal Gaetá Huguet in Castellón de la Plana. It served as the selection meeting for Spain at the 2015 World Championships in Athletics.

The club championships in relays and combined track and field events were contested separately from the main competition.

== Results ==
=== Men ===
Event	Gold		Silver		Bronze	
100 metres	Ángel David Rodríguez; FC Barcelona	10.37	Arian Olmos Téllez; Playas de Castellón	10.54PB	Frank Itoya; AD Marathon	10.65
200 metres	Bruno Hortelano; Playas de Castellón	20.85	Sergio Ruiz; JA Sabadell	21.09	Mauro Triana; CimansCoruña Comarca	21.23 PB
400 metres	Lucas Búa; FC Barcelona	45.98 s PB	Samuel García; Tenerife CajaCanarias	46.44 s	Darwin Echeverry; Tenerife CajaCanarias	46.45 s PB
800 metres	Kevin López; CD Nike Running	1:47.56	Álvaro de Arriba; Rincón Oeste	1:47.84	David Palacio; Simply-Scorpio 71	1:47.86
1500 metres	Adel Mechaal; AA Palamós	3:45.09	Carlos Alonso García; AA Valdemoro Go Fit	3:45.58	David Bustos; CD Nike Running	3:45.82
5000 metres	Adel Mechaal; AA Palamós	14:10.59 PB	Antonio Abadía; CD Nike Running	14:10.82	Jesús España; AA Valdemoro Go Fit	14:12.52
110 m hurdles	Yidiel Contreras; Playas de Castellón	13.39	Francisco Javier López López; Playas de Castellón	13.62 PB	Arnau Erta; FC Barcelona	13.73 PB
400 m hurdles	Sergio Fernández Roda; Pamplona Atlético	50.18	Diego Cabello; Playas de Castellón	51.12	Mark Ujakpor; Track Cross Road	51.14 PB
3000 m s'chase	Sebastián Martos; CD Nike Running	8:27.30	Ibrahim Ezzaydouny (MAR); FC Barcelona	8:27.43 PB	Roberto Aláiz; CD Nike Running	8:27.69
High jump	Miguel Ángel Sancho; Playas de Castellón	2.20 m	Jorge Debón; Playas de Castellón	2.17 m PB	Juan Ignacio López Barrafón; CA Fent Camí Mislata	2.13 m
Pole vault	Igor Bychkov; Playas de Castellón	5.50 m	Adrián Vallés; Pamplona Atlético	5.45 m	Rubem Miranda; Portugal	5.05 m
Long jump	Eusebio Cáceres; CD Nike Running	7.90 m	Jean Marie Okutu; FC Barcelona	7.78 m	Pedro Marín Gámez; Unicaja Atlétismo	7.49 m
Triple jump	Pablo Torrijos; Playas de Castellón	16.61 m	Sergio Solanas; AD Marathon	16.34 m	Jorge Gimeno; Playas de Castellón	16.17 m
Shot put	Borja Vivas; Atlético Málaga	20.28 m	Yioser Toledo; Playas de Castellón	20.23 m	Carlos Tobalina; FC Barcelona	19.92 m
Discus throw	Frank Casañas; Playas de Castellón	61.48 m	Pedro José Cuesta; FC Barcelona	57.56 m	Alejandro Vielva; Pamplona Atlético	56.55 m
Hammer throw	Javier Cienfuegos; Atlético Montijo	73.29 m	Isaac Vicente; AD Marathon	70.17 m	Miguel Alberto Blanco; FC Barcelona	67.63 m
Javelin throw	Jordi Sánchez Fernández; FC Barcelona	71.75 m	Bilal Nouali (MAR); AA Catalunya	70.43 m	Pablo Bugallo; Playas de Castellón	66.47 m
10,000 m walk	Miguel Ángel López; UCAM Murcia	39:15.61	Benjamín Sánchez; Athleto Cieza	40:03.35	Álvaro Martín; Playas de Castellón	40:13.60
Decathlon	Jorge Ureña; Centre Esportiu Colivenc	7853 pts	Jonay Jordan; Tenerife CajaCanarias	7531 pts	Ben Gregory; Great Britain	7364 pts
4 × 100 m relay	Real Sociedad; Octavian Mihael Romanescu (ROM); Orkatz Beitia; Alberto Muñoz; David Arques	40.37	AD Marathon; Alfredo Mpesco; Álvaro Plaza; Óscar Husillos; Frank Itoya	40.51	Playas de Castellón; Francisco Javier López; Arian Olmos Téllez; Alberto Gavaldá; Yunier Pérez	40.90
4 × 400 m relay	FC Barcelona; Pau Fradera; Javier Delgado Osorio; Iñigo Pérez Urretavizcaya; Lucas Búa	3:10.20	Playas de Castellón; David Jiménez Herrera; Diego Cabello Miñon; Alejandro Estévez; Antonie Gakeme	3:10.92	AD Marathon; Alejandro Lozano Burón; Guillermo Rojo Gil; Javier Cartagena; Jesús Pérez Ferreras	3:12.98

=== Women ===
Event	Gold		Silver		Bronze	
100 metres	Cristina Lara; FC Barcelona	11.65	Estela Villalta; Valencia Terra i Mar	11.66	María Isabel Pérez; Cueva de Nerja-UMA	11.75
200 metres	Nana Jacob; Tenerife CajaCanarias	23.71 PB	Alazne Furundarena; Atlético San Sebastián	23.96 PB	Carmen Sánchez Silva; Simply-Scorpio 71	24.12
400 metres	Aauri Bokesa; CD Nike Running	52.94	Bárbara Camblor; Playas de Castellón	53.99 PB	Elena Moreno; Playas de Castellón	54.60
800 metres	Esther Guerrero; FC Barcelona	2:05.69	Élian Périz; Valencia Terra i Mar	2:06.01	Khadija Rahmouni; CD Nike Running	2:07.41
1500 metres	Solange Pereira; Valencia Terra i Mar	4:17.21	Marta Pérez Miguel; Dental Seoane Pampín	4:17.53	Blanca Fernández De La Granja; Atlétismo Piélagos	4:17.73
5000 metres	Lidia Rodríguez Sierra; Atlétismo Santutxu	16:18.25	Nuria Lugueros; Atlétismo Piélagos	16:19.64	Ana Vega González; Atlétismo Piélagos	16:23.96 PB
100 m hurdles	Caridad Jerez; FC Barcelona	13.03	Nora Orduña*; Atlético San Sebastián	13.72	Alba Manzano*; AA Catalunya	14.10 s PB
400 m hurdles	Laura Natalí Sotomayor; Valencia Terra i Mar	58.50	Maryia Roshchyn; Playas de Castellón	59.67	Elisa Cortés; Simply-Scorpio 71	1:00.74
3000 m s'chase	Irene Sánchez-Escribano; Dental Seoane Pampín	9:53.65 PB	Elena García Grimau; Valencia Terra i Mar	9:54.43 PB	Diana Marín Hidalgo; Dental Seoane Pampín	9:55.54 PB
High jump	Ruth Beitia; Torralbo's Team	1.98 m	Cristina Ferrando; Valencia Terra i Mar	1.88 m PB	Claudia García Jou; FC Barcelona	1.85 m
Pole vault	Naroa Agirre; Atlético San Sebastián	4.30 m	Malen Ruiz de Azúa; Super Amara Bidasoa AT	4.05 m	Maialen Axpe; Atlético San Sebastián	4.05 m
Long jump	María del Mar Jover; Valencia Terra i Mar	6.42 m	Concepción Montaner; Playas de Castellón	6.27 m	Fátima Diame; Valencia Terra i Mar	6.06 m
Triple jump	Ana Peleteiro; CA Adidas	13.95 m	Patricia Sarrapio; Playas de Castellón	13.76 m	Andrea Calleja; AD Marathon	13.63 m
Shot put	Úrsula Ruíz; Valencia Terra i Mar	16.58 m	María Belén Toimil; Playas de Castellón	15.98 m	Elena Gutiérrez Hevia; Atlético Piélagos	14.48 m
Discus throw	Sabina Asenjo; FC Barcelona	61.36 m NR	Karen Gallardo; Chile	61.10 m PB	June Kintana; Pamplona Atlético	52.55 m
Hammer throw	Laura Redondo; FC Barcelona	66.51 m	Berta Castells; Valencia Terra i Mar	65.52 m	María Barbaño; AD Marathon	57.68 m
Javelin throw	Lidia Parada; Atlética Barbanza	59.03 m PB	Mercedes Chilla; Valencia Terra i Mar	56.05 m	Noraida Bicet; Valencia Terra i Mar	55.13 m
10,000 m walk	Júlia Takács; Playas de Castellón	44:00.36	María José Poves; Simply-Scorpio 71	44:17.21	Raquel González; FC Barcelona	44:47.51
Heptathlon	Jessica Taylor; Great Britain	5767 pts	Estefanía Fortes; AA Catalunya	5520 pts	Laura Ginés; Simpy-Scorpio 71	5498 pts
4 × 100 m relay	FC Barcelona; Jaël Bestué; Plácida Martínez; Caridad Jerez; Cristina Lara	45.73	Simply-Scorpio 71; Sonia Molina; Carmen Sánchez Silva; Sara María Santiago; Carlota Requena	46.21	AD Marathon; Sandra Pérez García; Olga María Mulas; Jessica Alloza; Andrea Calleja	47.16
4 × 400 m relay	Playas de Castellón; Sara Gómez Álvarez; Herminia Parra; Bárbara Camblor; Elena Moreno	3:43.18	FC Barcelona; Geraxane Ussia; Caridad Hernández; Alba Casanovas; Esther Guerrero	3:44.58	AA Catalunya; Sara Dorda; Laia Gil Milas; Irene Méndez; Zoya Naumov	3:45.66
