= 2016 Spanish Indoor Athletics Championships =

- Dates: 5–6 March
- Host city: Madrid
- Venue: Centro Deportivo Municipal Gallur
- Events: 26

The 2016 Spanish Indoor Athletics Championships was the 52nd edition of the annual indoor track and field competition organised by the Royal Spanish Athletics Federation (RFEA), which serves as the Spanish national indoor championship for the sport. A total of 26 events (divided evenly between the sexes) were contested over two days on 5 and 6 March at the Centro Deportivo Municipal Gallur in Madrid, Community of Madrid.

== Results ==
=== Men ===
Event	Gold		Silver		Bronze	
60 m	Arian Olmos Téllez	6.72	Mario López Moure	6.76	David Alejandro	6.83
200 m	Óscar Husillos	21.04	Daniel Cerdán	21.25	Alberto Salcedo	21.32
400 m	Lucas Búa	46.65	Mark Ujakpor	47.14	Pau Fradera	47.54
800 m	Kevin López	1:49.20	Álvaro de Arriba	1:49.64	Daniel Andújar	1:49.74
1500 m	Manuel Olmedo	4:02.79	Marc Alcalá	4:03.03	David Lorenzo	4:03.09
3000 m	Ayoub Mokhtar	8:16.29	Carlos Alonso García	8:16.32	Víctor García Blázquez	8:18.83
60 m hurdles	Jackson Quiñónez	7.86	Gerard Porras	7.88	Javier Colomo	7.92
High jump	Simón Siverio	2.20 m	Lysvanis Pérez	2.20 m	Juan Ignacio López	2.16 m
Pole vault	Igor Bychkov	5.30 m	Albert Alvárez	5.25 m	Ricard Clemente	5.15 m
Long jump	Jean Marie Okutu	7.68 m	Fernando Ramos	7.61 m	Jorge Ureña	7.49 m
Triple jump	Pablo Torrijos	16.66 m	José Emilio Bellido	16.37 m	José Alfonso Palomanes	15.81 m
Shot put	Carlos Tobalina	20.50 m	Borja Vivas	20.19 m	Alejandro Noguera	17.90 m
Heptathlon	Alejandro Bermejo	5581 pts	Vicente Guardiola	5429 pts	Jesús Castillo Patiño	5401 pts

=== Women ===
Event	Gold		Silver		Bronze	
60 m	Estela García	7.41	Caridad Jerez	7.43	María Isabel Pérez	7.47
200 m	Nana Jacob	23.71	Cristina Lara	23.78	Paloma Díez	24.15
400 m	Aauri Bokesa	53.39	Geraxane Ussía	54.10	Bárbara Camblor	54.64
800 m	Esther Guerrero	2:05.28	Laura Valdés	2:07.62	Zoya Naumov	2:08.90
1500 m	Solange Pereira	4:36.29	Montse Mas	4:36.37	Marta Pérez	4:37.09
3000 m	Nuria Fernández	9:09.29	Celia Antón	9:21.58	Ana Lozano	9:22.12
60 m hurdles	Caridad Jerez	8.25	Nora Orduña	8.52	María Caridad Hernández	8.61
High jump	Ruth Beitia	1.98 m	Raquel Álvarez Polo	1.90 m	Cristina Ferrando	1.87 m
Pole vault	Naroa Agirre	4.25 m	Carla Franch	4.15 m	Malen Ruiz de Azúa	4.15 m
Long jump	Juliet Itoya	6.47 m	Olatz Arrieta	6.23 m	María del Mar Jover	6.19 m
Triple jump	Ana Peleteiro	13.80 m	Patricia Sarrapio	13.57 m	Andera Calleja	13.17 m
Shot put	Úrsula Ruiz	16.75 m	María Belén Toimil	15.40 m	Elena Gutiérrez	15.16 m
Pentathlon	Yantra Soto	4124 pts	Tamara del Río	4066 pts	Andrea Medina	4052 pts
