= 2010 Spanish Athletics Championships =

- Dates: 17–18 July 2010
- Host city: Avilés, Spain
- Venue: Complejo Deportivo de Avilés

The 2010 Spanish Athletics Championships was the 90th edition of the national championship in outdoor track and field for Spain. It was held on 17 and 18 July at the Complejo Deportivo de Avilés in Avilés, Asturias. It served as the selection meeting for the 2010 European Athletics Championships. A total of 617 athletes (341 men and 276 women) competed at the event.

The club championships in relays and combined track and field events were contested separately from the main competition.

The original winner of the men's 3000 metres steeplechase, José Luis Blanco in 8:33.12 minutes, was later disqualified as his drug test at the competition came back positive for erythropoietin.

== Results ==
=== Men ===
Event	Gold		Silver		Bronze	
100 metres	Ángel David Rodríguez	10.44	Alain López	10.52	Orkatz Beitia	10.53
200 metres	Ángel David Rodríguez	21.01	Iván Jesús Ramos	21.32	Josue Mena	21.42
400 metres	Marc Orozco	47.21	Mark Ujakpor	47.38	Santiago Ezquerro	47.69
800 metres	Kevin López	1:47.48	Luis Alberto Marco	1:47.83	David Bustos	1:48.13
1500 metres	Manuel Olmedo	3:39.06	Arturo Casado	3:39.21	Reyes Estévez	3:39.53
5000 metres	Jesús España	13:18.46 CR	Alemayehu Bezabeh	13:18.95	Sergio Sánchez	13:19.21
110 m hurdles	Felipe Vivancos	13.73	Jackson Quiñónez	13.80	Francisco Javier Lopez	14.06
400 m hurdles	Diego Cabello Miñon	51.11	Ignacio Sarmiento	51.19	Javier Sagredo	51.89
3000 m s'chase	Ángel Mullera	8:33.13	Víctor García	8:33.94	Eliseo Martín	8:35.14
10,000 m walk	Miguel Ángel López	40:39:90	José Ignacio Díaz	40:58:14	Juan Manuel Molina	41:09:22
High jump	Javier Bermejo	2.15 m	Simón Siverio	2.12 m	Carles Triado	2.12 m
Pole vault	Albert Vélez	5.35 m	Manel Concepción	5.05 m	Javier Gazol	5.35 m
Long jump	Luis Felipe Méliz	8.06 m	Joan Lino Martínez	7.91 m	Jean Marie Okutu	7.62 m
Triple jump	Andrés Capellan	16.11 m	José Alfonso Palomanes	15.84 m	Jorge Gimeno	15.76 m
Shot put	Borja Vivas	19.91 m	Manolo Martínez	18.83 m	Germán Millán	18.71 m
Discus throw	Mario Pestano	63.81 m	Frank Casañas	63.50 m	Lois Maikel Martínez	59.04 m
Hammer throw	Javier Cienfuegos	71.21 m	Isaac Vicente	68.41 m	Moisés Campeny	66.09 m
Javelin throw	Rafael Baraza	74.21 m	José Manuel Vila	70.57 m	David García	68.82 m
4 × 100 m relay	Playas de Castellón; Luis Wee Palacios; Orkatz Beitia; Iván Martínez; José López Reina	40.69	Cueva de Nerja-Uma; Francisco Javier López; Iván López; José Antonio Andújar; Josué Mena	41.19	AD Marathon; Jorge Alberto del Río Salas; Iñaki Iturrioz; Alberto Dorrego; Eduardo Quintero	41.32
4 × 400 m relay	AD Marathon; Javier Cartagena Teigell; Ignacio Laguna Aparicio; Miguel Cartagena Teigell; Mark Ujakpor	3:12.00	Pto. Alicante OHL; Alesander Navas Blades; José Fernando Díez Comendez; Víctor Riobo Villanueva; Youness Belkaifa	3:12.78	Playas de Castellón; Juan Enrique Valles Pastor; Juan Manuel García; Yaudy Fernandez Vacas (CUB); Diego Cabello Minon	3:13.90
Decathlon	Agustín Félix Esbri	7337 pts	Imanol Cardona Ardanuy	6468 pts	Javier Pérez Rasines	6402 pts

=== Women ===
Event	Gold		Silver		Bronze	
100 metres	Digna Luz Murillo	11.56	María Cotán Reyes	11.70	Estela García	11.75
200 metres	Plácida Martínez	24.41	Sara María Martínez	24.57	Belén Recio	24.62
400 metres	Mayte Martínez	54.24	Begoña Garrido	54.31	Aauri Bokesa	54.91
800 metres	Irene Alfonso	2:04.31	Élian Périz	2:04.65	Margarita Fuentes-Pila	2:06.11
1500 metres	Natalia Rodríguez	4:21.45	Nuria Fernández	4:22.42	Isabel Macías	4:26.67
5000 metres	Judith Plá	15:35.23	Kanbouchia Soud	15:35.88	Gema Barrachina	15:44.22
100 m hurdles	Ana Torrijos	13.58	Virginia Villar	14.53	Marta Sainz Vela	14.64
400 m hurdles	Laia Forcadell	58.30	Laura Natalí Sotomayor	59.48	Olga Ortega	59.99
3000 m steeplechase	Rosa Morató	9:45.47	Zulema Fuentes-Pila	9:46.26	Eva Arias	10:01.48
10,000 m walk	Beatriz Pascual	42:40:33 NR	Lorena Luaces	46:06:24	Ainhoa Pinedo	46:10:28
High jump	Ruth Beitia	2.00 m	Marta Mendía	1.83 m	Raquel Álvarez	1.80 m
Pole vault	Naroa Agirre	4.15 m	Anna Pinero	4.05 m	Marta Casanova	3.85 m
Long jump	Concepción Montaner	6.35 m	Juliet Itoya	6.25 m	Petra Mun	6.13 m
Triple jump	Ruth Ndoumbe	13.31 m	Maitane Azpeitia	13.25 m	Rebeca Azcona	13.10 m
Shot put	Úrsula Ruiz	16.38 m	Irache Quintanal	16.15 m	Magnolia Iglesias	15.79 m
Discus throw	Irache Quintanal	54.52 m	Sabina Asenjo	54.06 m	Alice Matějková	50.44 m
Hammer throw	Berta Castells	65.70 m	Laura Redondo	61.61 m	Erika Soriano	57.25 m
Javelin throw	Mercedes Chilla	61.04 m CR	Carmen Sánchez Parrondo	48.23 m	Vanessa Morales	46.48 m
4 × 100 m relay	Valencia Terra i Mar; Ana Torrijos; Digna Luz Murillo; Belén Recio; Amparo Cotán	45.43	Krafft-San Sebastián; Alazne Furundarena; Marian Garrantxo; Marta Peña Oyarzábal; Amaya Alzelay	46.81	Cueva de Nerja-Uma; Desiree Valderrama; María del Pilar Cortacero; Araceli López; María Isabel Pérez	47.89
4 × 400 m relay	AD Marathon; Begoña Garrido Barro; Yolanda García Suarez; María Victoria Priego Ruiz; Aauri Bokesa	3:45.62	Pto. Alicante OHL; Ángela López Marti; Isabel Macías; Maria Andres del Rio; Laura Sotomayor	3:47.21	Piélagos Inelecma; Sara Uceda Hinojosa; Talania Buria García; Ana María Muriedas García; Leyre Martín Larrain	3:47.43
Heptathlon	Bárbara Hernando Fuster	5580 pts	Estefanía Fortes	5436 pts PB	Laura Ginés Sánchez	5332 pts PB
