= María Isabel Pérez (sprinter) =

Spanish Olympic athlete

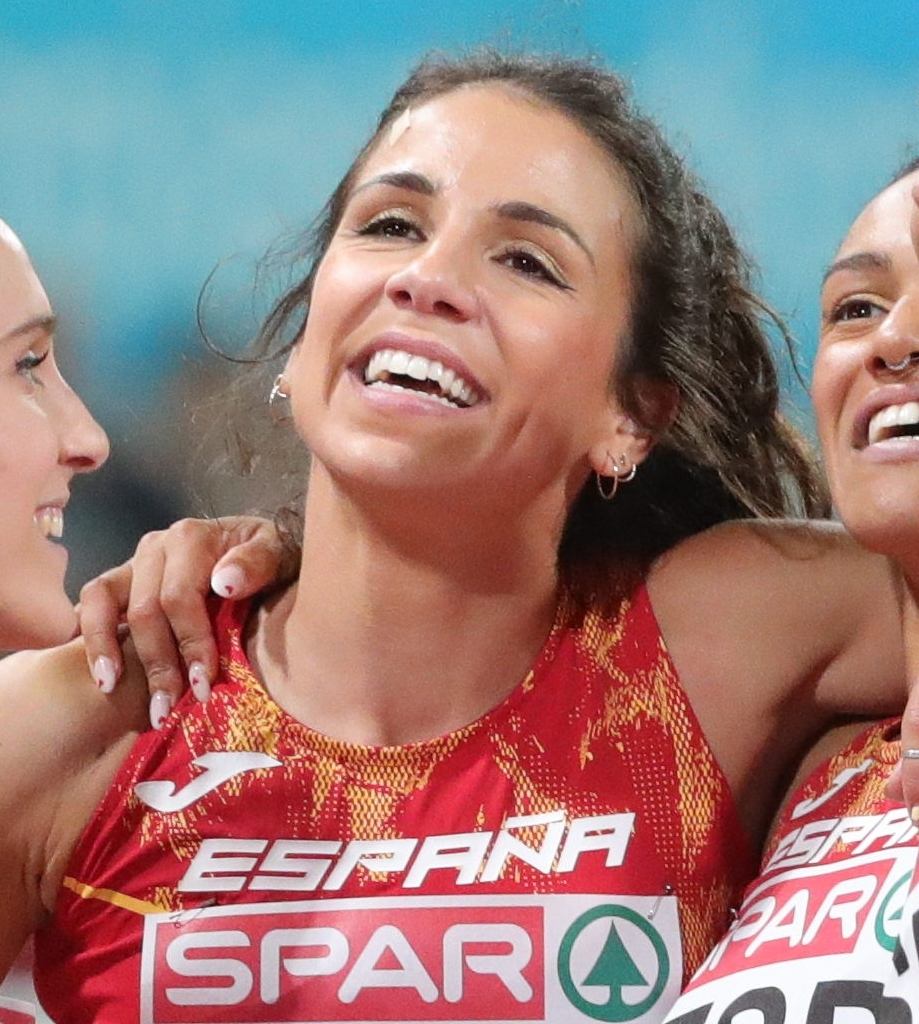
- Pérez in 2022

Personal information
- Full name: María Isabel Pérez Rodríguez
- Nationality: Spanish
- Born: 1 March 1993 (age 33) Seville, Spain
- Height: 160 cm (5 ft 3 in)

Sport
- Sport: Track and Field
- Event: 100 metres
Medal record
Women's athletics
Representing Spain
European Championships
Bronze medal – third place	2026 Birmingham	4 × 100 m mixed
World Relays
Silver medal – second place	2025 Guangzhou	4 × 100 m relay
Bronze medal – third place	2026 Gaborone	4 × 100 m relay

María Isabel Pérez Rodríguez (born 1 March 1993) is a Spanish sprinter. She competed for Spain at the 2020 and 2024 Olympic Games.

== Early life ==
She was born in Seville, but grew up living in Jerez de la Frontera. She started out in athletics at the Puma Chapín Jerez club when she was seven years-old.

== Career ==
Perez ran for Spain the 2018 European Athletics Championships in the 4 × 100 metres relay in Berlin, Germany. She competed in the individual 100 metres at the 2020 Olympic Games, she finished fifth in her heat running a time of 11.51.

She was part of the Spanish 4 × 100 m team that finished fifth at the World Athletics Championships in Eugene, Oregon, breaking the Spanish national record and running 42.58 seconds. She was selected for the 2022 European Athletics Championships in Munich in August 2022 to run both the individual 100 metres and the 4 × 100 m relay. The relay team finished fourth in the final with a time of 43.03 seconds.

She ran as part of the Spanish 4 × 100 m relay team at the 2024 World Relays Championships in Nassau, Bahamas. She was selected for the 2024 European Athletics Championships in Rome in June 2024 to run both the individual 100 metres and the 4 × 100 m relay. At the Championships, the Spanish relay team qualified for the final, and placed fifth overall.

She was officially selected for the 2024 Paris Olympics in July 2024. In the relay, the team ran a seasons best 42.77 seconds but did not progress to the final.

She set a new Spanish record of 7.15 seconds and won the Spanish national 60 metres title in February 2025. She was selected for the 60 metres at the 2025 European Athletics Indoor Championships in Appeldoorn where she qualified for the semi-finals. She was selected for the Spanish relay pool for the 2025 World Athletics Relays in China. In the 4 x 100 metres relay she was part of a team alongside Jaël Bestué, Esperança Cladera, Paula Sevilla who won their opening race ahead of Jamaica containing Shelly-Ann Fraser-Pryce and Shericka Jackson, with a time of 42.18 seconds, setting a Spanish national record, and ensuring qualification for the 2025 World Championships. She was part of the Spanish 4 x 100 metres team, again alongside Esperança Cladera, Sevilla and Bestue, which set another new Spanish record of 42.11 seconds at the 2025 European Athletics Team Championships First Division in Madrid on 28 June.

In September 2025, she competed as the Spanish team finished fifth in the women's 4 x 100 metres at the 2025 World Championships in Tokyo, Japan.

Perez was selected as part of the Spain team for the 2026 World Athletics Relays in Gaborone, Botswana, and ran in the women's 4 x 100 metres relay and in the mixed 4 x 100 metres relay team which both qualified from the heats on the opening day of competition. The following day, she ran in the women's quartet which won the bronze medal in the final behind Jamaica and Canada. Calbano competed alongside Spanish teammates Guillem Crespí, Andoni Calbano and Jael Bestue, Pérez won the bronze medal in the mixed 4 × 100 m at the 2026 European Athletics Championships in Birmingham, England, in August 2026. She also competed in the women's 100 metres at the championships, reaching the semi-finals.

== Personal life ==
She studied physiotherapy at the University of Seville. She subsequently worked as a physiotherapist in Seville. She is coached by her uncle Luis Rodríguez who competed for Spain at the 1991 World Athletics Championships.

== Athletic Achievements ==
=== Personal bests ===
Type	Distance	Time (s)	Wind (m/s)	Venue	Date	Notes
Individual events
Indoor	60 metres	7.15	—N/a	Madrid, Spain	22 February 2025	NR
Outdoor	100 metres	11.07	+1.6	Nerja, Spain	25 June 2022	
Outdoor	200 metres	24.28	-1.7	Pamplona, Spain	1 June 2019	
Team events
Indoor	4 × 200 metres relay sh	1:38.99	—N/a	Valencia, Spain	30 January 2016	
Outdoor	4 × 100 metres relay	42.11	—N/a	Madrid, Spain	28 June 2025	NR

=== International competitions ===
Representing Spain
Year	Competition	Venue	Position	Event	Time	Notes
2012	World Junior Championships	Barcelona, Spain	—	4 × 100 m relay	DQ	TR24.7
2013	European Team Championships Super League	Gateshead, United Kingdom	9th	4 × 100 m relay	45.06	
2014	European Team Championships Super League	Braunschweig, Germany	—	4 × 100 m relay	DQ	TR24.7
2014	European Championships	Zürich, Switzerland	14th (h)	4 × 100 m relay	44.68	SB
2016	European Championships	Amsterdam, Netherlands	10th (h)	4 × 100 m relay	44.14	SB
2018	Mediterranean Games	Tarragona, Spain	7th	100 m	11.69	
2018	Mediterranean Games	Tarragona, Spain	2nd	4 × 100 m relay	43.31	NR
2018	European Championships	Berlin, Germany	21st (h)	100 m	11.70	
2018	European Championships	Berlin, Germany	8th	4 × 100 m relay	43.54	
2019	European Team Championships Super League	Bydgoszcz, Poland	5th	4 × 100 m relay	43.94	SB
2021	European Indoor Championships	Toruń, Poland	26th (h)	60 m	7.39	
2021	World Relays	Chorzów, Poland	9th (h)	4 × 100 m relay	44.38	SB
2021	European Team Championships Super League	Chorzów, Poland	5th	100 m	11.36	
2021	Olympic Games	Tokyo, Japan	41st (h)	100 m	11.51	
2022	World Indoor Championships	Belgrade, Serbia	18th (sf)	60 m	7.20	
2022	Ibero-American Championships	La Nucia, Spain	3rd	100 m	11.48	
2022	Ibero-American Championships	La Nucia, Spain	—	4 × 100 m relay	DQ	TR24.7
2022	World Championships	Eugene, United States	33rd (h)	100 m	11.30	
2022	World Championships	Eugene, United States	5th	4 × 100 m relay	42.58	NR
2022	European Championships	Munich, Germany	6th	100 m	11.28	
2022	European Championships	Munich, Germany	4th	4 × 100 m relay	43.03	
2024	World Indoor Championships	Glasgow, United Kingdom	17th (sf)	60 m	7.26	
2024	World Relays	Nassau, Bahamas	7th (h)	4 × 100 m relay	42.85	Re
2024	World Relays	Nassau, Bahamas	6th	4 × 100 m relay	42.88	
2024	European Championships	Rome, Italy	21st (sf)	100 m	11.41	
2024	European Championships	Rome, Italy	5th	4 × 100 m relay	42.84	SB
2024	Olympic Games	Paris, France	11th (h)	4 × 100 m relay	42.77	SB
2025	European Indoor Championships	Apeldoorn, Netherlands	10th (sf)	60 m	7.17	
2025	World Relays	Guangzhou, China	2nd	4 × 100 m relay	42.18	NR WQ
2025	European Team Championships First Division	Madrid, Spain	10th	100 m	11.31	
2025	European Team Championships First Division	Madrid, Spain	2nd	4 × 100 m relay	42.11	NR
2025	World Championships	Tokyo, Japan	5th	4 × 100 m relay	42.47	
2026	World Relays	Gaborone, Botswana	5th	4 × 100 m relay Mx	41.05	WQ
2026	World Relays	Gaborone, Botswana	3rd	4 × 100 m relay	42.31	WQ
2026	European Championships	Birmingham, United Kingdom	18th (sf)	100 m	11.31	
2026	European Championships	Birmingham, United Kingdom	—	4 × 100 m relay	DNF	
2026	European Championships	Birmingham, United Kingdom	3rd	4 × 100 m relay Mx	40.42	NR

=== National championships and competitions ===
Year	Competition	Venue	Position	Event	Time	Notes
2010	Spanish Indoor Championships	Valencia	15th (sf)	60 m	7.94	
2010	Spanish U18 Indoor Championships	Oviedo	1st	60 m	7.79	
2010	Spanish Championships	Avilés	3rd	4 × 100 m relay	47.89	
2011	Spanish Junior Indoor Championships	Sabadell	5th	60 m	7.90	
2011	Spanish Junior Championships	Xàtiva	3rd	100 m	12.16	
2012	Spanish Indoor Championships	Sabadell	15th (sf)	60 m	7.92	
2012	Spanish Junior Championships	Avilés	2nd	100 m	12.20	
2012	Spanish Championships	Pamplona	9th (sf)	100 m	12.35	
2013	Spanish U23 Indoor Championships	San Sebastián	1st	60 m	7.66	
2013	Spanish Indoor Championships	Sabadell	6th	60 m	7.72	
2013	Spanish U23 Championships	Mataró	1st	100 m	12.21	
2013	Spanish Championships	Alcobendas	5th	100 m	12.08	
2013	Spanish Championships	Alcobendas	4th	4 × 100 m relay	47.20	
2014	Spanish U23 Indoor Championships	Antequera	2nd	60 m	7.76	
2014	Spanish Indoor Championships	Sabadell	6th	60 m	7.64	
2014	Spanish Championships	Alcobendas	2nd	100 m	11.92	
2015	Spanish U23 Championships	Tarragona	2nd	100 m	12.05	
2015	Spanish Championships	Castellón de la Plana	3rd	100 m	11.75	
2016	Spanish Indoor Championships	Madrid	3rd	100 m	7.47	
2016	Spanish Championships	Gijón	2nd	100 m	11.60	
2016	Spanish Championships	Gijón	2nd	4 × 100 m relay	45.65	
2017	Spanish Indoor Championships	Salamanca	2nd	60 m	7.53	
2017	Spanish Championships	Barcelona	3rd	100 m	11.75	
2017	Spanish Championships	Barcelona	1st	4 × 100 m relay	45.62	
2018	Spanish Indoor Championships	Valencia	4th	60 m	7.53	
2018	Spanish Championships	Getafe	1st	100 m	11.17	
2018	Spanish Championships	Getafe	2nd	4 × 100 m relay	44.77	
2019	Spanish Indoor Championships	Antequera	5th	60 m	7.43	
2019	Spanish Championships	La Nucia	2nd	100 m	11.42	
2019	Spanish Championships	La Nucia	2nd	4 × 100 m relay	45.14	
2020	Spanish Indoor Championships	Ourense	1st	60 m	7.38	
2021	Spanish Indoor Championships	Madrid	2nd	60 m	7.33	
2021	Spanish Championships	Getafe	1st	100 m	11.29	
2022	Spanish Indoor Championships	Ourense	1st	60 m	7.16	
2022	Spanish Championships	Nerja	—	100 m	DNS	
2023	Spanish Indoor Championships	Madrid	2nd	60 m	7.32	
2024	Spanish Indoor Championships	Ourense	2nd	60 m	7.30	
2025	Spanish Indoor Championships	Madrid	1st	60 m	7.18	
2025	Spanish Championships	Tarragona	3rd	100 m	11.37	
2026	Spanish Championships	Málaga	1st	100 m	11.28	
