= 2013 Spanish Athletics Championships =

- Dates: 27–28 July 2013
- Host city: Alcobendas, Spain
- Venue: Polideportivo José Caballero

The 2013 Spanish Athletics Championships was the 93rd edition of the national championship in outdoor track and field for Spain. It was held on 27 and 28 July at the Polideportivo José Caballero in Alcobendas. It served as the selection meeting for Spain at the 2013 World Championships in Athletics.

The club championships in relays and combined track and field events were contested separately from the main competition.

== Results ==
=== Men ===
| Event | Gold | | Silver | | Bronze | |
|---|---|---|---|---|---|---|
| 100 metres | Ángel David Rodríguez; FC Barcelona | 10.26 | Bruno Hortelano; Playas de Castellón | 10.43 | Adrià Burriel; CA Mollet | 10.45 |
| 200 metres | Bruno Hortelano; Playas de Castellón | 20.58 CR | Sergio Ruiz; JA Sabadell | 20.86 | Iván Jesús Ramos; FC Barcelona | 20.90 |
| 400 metres | Samuel García; Tenerife CajaCanarias | 46.43 | Roberto Briones; La Rioja Atletismo | 46.87 | Mark Ujakpor; Playas de Castellón | 47.16 |
| 800 metres | Kevin López; CD Nike Running | 1:47.96 | Luis Alberto Marco; CD Nike Running | 1:48.42 | Alejandro Rodríguez; AA Catalunya | 1:49.43 |
| 1500 metres | David Bustos; CD Nike Running | 3:47.11 | Arturo Casado; CA Adidas | 3:47.39 | Víctor Corrales; Playas de Castellón | 3:47.49 |
| 5000 metres | Sergio Sánchez; Unión Guadalajara | 13:32.68 | Alberto Lozano; AD Marathon | 13:34.80 | Alemayehu Bezabeh; Atletismo Bikila | 13:35.59 |
| 110 m hurdles | Francisco Javier López; Playas de Castellón | 13.82 | Pedro García; AD Marathon | 13.83 | Iban Maiza; Real Sociedad | 14.16 |
| 400 m hurdles | Diego Cabello; Playas de Castellón | 50.28 | Ignacio Sarmiento; SG Pontevedra | 51.30 | Enrique González; Playas de Castellón | 51.56 |
| 3000 m s'chase | Ángel Mullera; CA Lloret - La Selva | 8:29.61 | Roberto Aláiz; Universidad Oviedo | 8:30.69 | Sebastián Martos; FC Barcelona | 8:35.36 |
| 10,000 m walk | Miguel Ángel López; UCAM - Athleo Cieza | 39:07.58 | Álvaro Martín; Playas de Castellón | 39:52.20 AJR | José Ignacio Díaz; UBU-Caja de Burgos | 41:32.07 |
| 4 × 100 m relay | FC Barcelona; Patrick Ike Chinedu; Iván Jesús Ramos; Robert Díez Ibáñez; Ángel David Rodríguez | 40.30 | Playas de Castellón; Martinez Caraball. Bruno Hortelano; Alberto Gavaldá; Francisco Javier López | 40.42 | AD Marathon; Alfredo Mpeso Coley; Jorge del Río Ibarra; Alejandro Lozano Buron; Fredy Quintero | 40.88 |
| 4 × 400 m relay | Playas de Castellón; Diego Cabello Miñon; Daniel Andújar; Alejandro Estevez Martín; Mark Ujakpor | 3:08.96 | FC Barcelona; Pau Fradera Miralles; Erete Udomsinachi; Albert Martinez Saura; Ignacio Laguna Aparicio | 3:10.68 | Huracán Fent Camí; Jose Luis Alaves Clemente; Albert Mico Cebolla; Lucas Búa; Llorenç Sales Ferre | 3:14.16 |
| Long jump | Jean Marie Okutu; FC Barcelona | 7.76 m | Luis Felipe Méliz; Independent | 7.75 m | Rodrigo de la Oliva; AD Marathon | 7.66 m |
| Triple jump | Pablo Torrijos; Playas de Castellón | 16.71 m | José Alfonso Palomares; SG Pontevedra | 16.21 m | Vicente Docavo; Playas de Castellón | 15.93 m |
| High jump | Simón Siverio; Tenerife CajaCanarias | 2.20 m | Ignacio Vigo; Hinaco Monzón | 2.18 m | Javier Bermejo; FC Barcelona | 2.15 m |
| Pole vault | Igor Bychkov; Playas de Castellón | 5.65 m | Didac Salas; FC Barcelona | 5.35 m | David Moya; AA Catalunya | 5.35 m |
| Shot put | Borja Vivas; At. Málaga | 19.92 m | Yioser Toledo; Playas de Castellón | 19.41 m | Carlos Tobalina; Grupo ISN Navarra At | 19.24 m |
| Discus throw | Mario Pestano; CanaryRun | 63.87 m | Frank Casañas; Playas de Castellón | 63.67 m | Pedro José Cuesta; FC Barcelona | 59.04 m |
| Hammer throw | Javier Cienfuegos; Playas de Castellón | 76.08 m CR | Isaac Vicente; AD Marathon | 69.53 m | Pedro José Martín; FC Barcelona | 65.54 m |
| Javelin throw | Manuel Uriz; Huracán Fent Camí | 69.60 m | Jordi Sánchez Fernández; FC Barcelona | 68.63 m | Jesús Crossa; Tenerife CajaCanarias | 65.87 m |
| Decathlon | David Gómez; RC Celta | 7484 pts | Jonay Jordan; Tenerife CajaCanarias | 7428 pts | Jorge Ureña; Centre Esp. Colivenc | 7358 pts |

=== Women ===
| Event | Gold | | Silver | | Bronze | |
|---|---|---|---|---|---|---|
| 100 metres | Estela García; Valencia Terra i Mar | 11.61 | Juliet Itoya; A.D. Marathon | 11.86 | María de Frutos; CA Valladolid-U.Va | 11.99 |
| 200 metres | Estela García; Valencia Terra i Mar | 23.90 | Belén Recio; Valencia Terra i Mar | 24.55 | Elena Moreno Huerta; Playas de Castellon | 24.63 |
| 400 metres | Aauri Bokesa; Valencia Terra i Mar | 51.77 PB | Laura Bueno; Ciudad de Granada | 54.33 PB | Geraxane Ussia Bertolaza; Simply-Scorpio 71 | 54.73 PB |
| 800 metres | Adriana Cagigas Gil; Costa de Ajo | 2:08.75 | Khadija Rahmouni El Alami; A. D. Marathon | 2:08.85 | Élian Périz; Valencia Terra i Mar | 2:09.01 |
| 1500 metres | Natalia Rodríguez; CD Nike Running | 4:24.13 | Isabel Macías; Valencia Terra i Mar | 4:24.61 | Elena García Grimau; Valencia Terra i Mar | 4:24.75 |
| 5000 metres | Dolores Checa; Valencia Terra i Mar | 15:41.79 | Judith Plá; Atletismo Santutxu | 15:49.10 | Khadija Sammah (MAR); Unicaja Atletismo | 15:54.36 |
| 100 m hurdles | Olatz Arrieta Hernández; Super Amara BAT | 13.96 | Irene Almarcha Conejero; Playas de Castellon | 13.96 PB | Marta Azores Muelas; Sprint AtletismoLeon | 14.24 |
| 400 m hurdles | Laura Natalí Sotomayor Ramirez; Valencia Terra i Mar | 59.12 | Carlota Serrano Abellán; A. D. Marathon | 1:00.45 | Mariya Roshchyn Nikitin; Piélagos Inelecma | 1:00.58 PB |
| 3000 m s'chase | Diana Martín; Valencia Terra i Mar | 9:54.37 | Teresa Urbina; FC Barcelona | 10:06.45 | Diana Martin Hidalgo; Dental Seoane Pampin | 10:10.96 PB |
| 10,000 m walk | Júlia Takács; Independent | 42:32.74 NR | Maria José Poves; Simply-Scorpio 71 | 43:33.75 PB | Beatriz Pascual; Valencia Terra i Mar | 43:39.42 |
| High jump | Ruth Beitia; Piélagos Inelecma | 1.93 m | Cristina Ferrando Fores; Playas de Castellon | 1.79 m | Noelia Ruiz Carrera; Piélagos Inelecma | 1.75 m |
| Pole vault | Naroa Agirre; At. San Sebastian | 4.40 m | Anna Maria Pinero Ortiz; Valencia Terra i Mar | 4.15 m | Carla Franch Almela; FC Barcelona | 4.10 m |
| Long jump | María del Mar Jover; Valencia Terra i Mar | 6.55 m (+1.6 m/s) | Olatz Arrieta Hernandez; Super Amara BAT | 6.28 m (+0.3 m/s) | Juliet Itoya; A. D. Marathon | 6.23 m (+0.3 m/s) |
| Triple jump | Patricia Sarrapio; Valencia Terra i Mar | 13.50 m (+0.2 m/s) | Ruth Ndoumbe alencia Terra i Mar | 13.38 m (+1.5 m/s) | Debora Calveras Barat; FC Barcelona | 13.35 m (+1.0 m/s) |
| Shot put | Úrsula Ruiz; Valencia Terra i Mar | 16.50 m | María Belén Toimil; Playas de Castellon | 14.97 m | Irache Quintanal; Valencia Terra i Mar | 14.52 m |
| Discus throw | Sabina Asenjo; FC Barcelona | 52.58 m | Mercedes de Santalo; Playas de Castellon | 49.47 m | Irache Quintanal; Valencia Terra i Mar | 49.06 m |
| Hammer throw | Berta Castells; Valencia Terra i Mar | 66.88 m | Laura Redondo; FC Barcelona | 65.52 m | Maria Barbanó Acevedo Gomez; A. D. Marathon | 56.35 m |
| Javelin throw | Noraaida Bicet; Valencia Terra i Mar | 55.96 m | Mercedes Chilla; Valencia Terra i Mar | 54.49 m | Arantza Moreno; Bidezabal Atletismo | 53.72 m PB |
| Heptathlon | Estefania Estrella Fortes Criado; AA Catalunya | 5340 pts | Laura Gines Sanchez; Simply-Scorpio 71 | 5261 pts | Tamara Del Rio Escribano; AA Catalunya | 5053 pts |
| 4 × 100 m relay | Valencia Terra i Mar; Fátima Diame; Belen Recio Cuevas; Estela García; Indira Terrero | 45.45 | A. D. Marathon; Monica Rayon Calderon; L. Perez Garcia De; Yolanda Garcia Suarez; Juliet Itoya | 46.91 | Playas de Castellon; Maria Martin-Sacristan Gandia; Paloma Diez Cañete; Irene Almarcha Conejero; Ana Martin-Sacristan Gandia | 47.08 |
| 4 × 400 m relay | Valencia Terra i Mar; Hernandez Guardio; Indira Terrero; Élian Périz; Aauri Bokesa | 3:41.54 | Playas de Castellon; Teresa Torres Gutierrez; Elena Moreno Huerta; Barbara Camblor Garcia; Lydia Mashila | 3:43.24 | AA Catalunya; Sara Dorda Sans; Irene Bonilla Segura; Irene Mendez Lara; Maria Stephanie Thomas | 3:43.68 |
