= 2020 Spanish Indoor Athletics Championships =

- Dates: 29 February – 1 March
- Host city: Ourense
- Venue: Pista Cubierta de Expourense
- Events: 26

The 2020 Spanish Indoor Athletics Championships was the 56th edition of the annual indoor track and field competition organised by the Royal Spanish Athletics Federation (RFEA), which serves as the Spanish national indoor championship for the sport. A total of 26 events (divided evenly between the sexes) were contested over two days on 29 February and 1 March at the Pista Cubierta de Expourense in Ourense, Galicia.

== Results ==
=== Men ===
Event	Gold		Silver		Bronze	
60 metres	Orlando Ortega; C.A. Adidas	6.65 PB	Sergio López Barranco; At. Alcantarilla	6.67 PB	Pablo Montalvo; A.D. Marathon	6.68 PB
200 metres	Daniel Rodríguez Serrano; Playas de Castellón	20.90 PB	Jesús Gómez; Nerja Atletismo	21.30	Javier Troyano; At. Málaga	21.49
400 metres	Lucas Búa; F.C. Barcelona	46.60	Samuel García; Tenerife Caja Canarias	46.50	Manuel Guijarro Arenas; F.C. Barcelona	46.66 PB
800 metres	Pablo Sánchez-Valladares; F.C. Barcelona	1:53.64	Adrián Ben; F.C. Barcelona	1:53.76	Mariano García García; C.D. Nike Running	1:53.83
1500 metres	Jesús Gómez; C.D. Nike Running	3:49.08	Ignacio Fontes García-Balibrea; Playas de Castellón	3:49.09	Saúl Ordóñez; New Balance Team	3:51.40
3000 metres	Adel Mechaal; New Balance Team	8:15.74	Gonzalo García Garrido; Playas de Castellón	8:16.21	Fernando Carro; C.D. Nike Running	8:17.13
60 m hurdles	Orlando Ortega; C.A. Adidas	7.56	Enrique Llopis Doménech; C.A. Gandía	7.79	Yidiel Contreras; Playas de Castellón	7.84
High jump	Alexis Sastre; Playas de Castellón	2.22 m PB	Carlos Rojas Lombardo; Unicaja Atletismo	2.18 m	Miguel Ángel Sancho; Playas de Castellón	2.16 m
Pole vault	Igor Bychkov; Playas de Castellón	5.42 m	Adrián Vallés; Grupompleo Pamplona	5.32 m	Isidro Leyva; Nerja Atletismo	5.22 m
Long jump	Jean Marie Okutu; F.C. Barcelona	7.93 m	Eusebio Cáceres; Independent	7.91 m	Francisco Javier Cobián; Universidad Oviedo	7.80 m PB
Triple jump	Pablo Torrijos; Playas de Castellón	17.18 m CR, NR	Ramón Adalia; A.A. Catalunya	16.29 m	José Emilio Bellido; Playas de Castellón	15.96 m
Shot put	Borja Vivas; At. Málaga	19.61 m	Carlos Tobalina; F.C. Barcelona	19.32 m	Ángel Poveda; Scorpio 71	18.29 m PB
Heptathlon	Jorge Ureña; Playas de Castellón	6143 pts	Bruno Comín; A.D. Marathon	5480 pts	Jorge Dávila López; Playas de Castellón	5423 pts

=== Women ===
Event	Gold		Silver		Bronze	
60 metres	María Isabel Pérez; Valencia Esports Aitana Rodrigo; At. San Sebastián	7.38	Not awarded		Ona Rossell; Cornellá At.	7.40
200 metres	Paula Sevilla; Playas de Castellón	23.43	Nerea Bermejo; Grupompleo Pamplona	23:56. PB	Sonia Molina Prados; Scorpio 71	23.89 =PB
400 metres	Andrea Jiménez; Playas de Castellón	53.73	Carmen Avilés; Dep. Los Califas	54.39 PB	Carmen Sánchez Silva; Valencia Esports	54:42
800 metres	Natalia Romero; Unicaja Atletismo	2:03.78 PB	Lucía Pinacchio; F.C. Barcelona	2:06.46 PB	Lorena Martín; Playas de Castellón	2:07.13 PB
1500 metres	Esther Guerrero; New Balance Team	4:11.12 CR	Marta Pérez; C.A. Adidas	4:14.13	Solange Pereira; Valencia Esports	4:15.47
3000 metres	Maitane Melero; Grupompleo Pamplona	9:12.29	Beatriz Álvarez Díaz; Bilbao Atletismo	9:15.01	Lucía Rodríguez Montero; C.D. Nike Running	9:19.54 PB
60 m hurdles	Teresa Errandonea; Super Amara BAT	8.05	Caridad Jerez; F.C. Barcelona	8.09 PB	Estefenía Estrella Fortes; Unicaja Atletismo	8.34 PB
High jump	Cristina Ferrando; Playas de Castellón	1.85 m PB	Saleta Fernández; Valencia Esports	1.79 m	Una Stancev; Nerja Atletismo	1.79 m PB
Pole vault	Miren Bartolomé; Grupompleo Pamplona	4.32 m PB	Malen Ruiz de Azúa; Valencia Esports	4.26 m	Maialen Axpe; At. San Sebastián	4.16 m
Long jump	Fátima Diame; Valencia Esports	6.47 m	Laila Lacuey; Grupompleo Pamplona	6.27 m PB	Leticia Gil; Playas de Castellón	6.19 m
Triple jump	Ana Peleteiro; C.A. Adidas	13.90 m	Patricia Sarrapio; Playas de Castellón	13.71 m	Marina Lobato; F.C. Barcelona	13.12 m
Shot put	Úrsula Ruiz; Valencia Esports	16.42 m	María Belén Toimil; Playas de Castellón	16.16 m	Mónica Borraz; A.D. Marathon	14.99 m
Pentathlon	María Vicente; C.D. Nike Running	4143 pts	Claudia Conte; Playas de Castellón	4123 pts	Patricia Ortega Trincado; At. San Sebastián	4118 pts
