= 2019 Spanish Athletics Championships =

- Edition: 99th
- Start date: 31 August
- End date: 1 September
- Host city: La Nucia, Spain
- Venue: Ciudad Deportiva Camilo Cano

The 2019 Spanish Athletics Championships was the 99th edition of the national championship in outdoor track and field for Spain. It was held on 31 August and 1 September at the Ciudad Deportiva Camilo Cano in La Nucia. It served as the selection meeting for Spain at the 2019 World Championships in Athletics.

The club championships in relays and combined track and field events were contested separately from the main competition.

== Results ==
=== Men ===
Event	Gold		Silver		Bronze	
100 metres (wind: +0.4 m/s)	Sergio Juárez; Playas de Castellón	10.32 PB	Ángel David Rodríguez; F.C. Barcelona	10.39	Arian Olmos Téllez; Playas de Castellón	10.44
200 metres (wind: -0.3 m/s)	Pol Retamal; F.C. Barcelona	20.80	Daniel Rodríguez Serrano; Playas de Castellón	21.06	Mauro Triana; Playas de Castellón	21.26
400 metres	Óscar Husillos; C.A. Adidas	45.83	Julio Arenas; C.A. Fent Camí Mislata	46.44	Darwin Echeverry; Tenerife Cajacanarias	46.49
800 metres	Mariano García García; Fuente Álamo C.R.R.	1:47.22	Adrián Ben; F.C. Barcelona	1:47.28	Álvaro de Arriba; F.C. Barcelona	1:47.45
1500 metres	Kevin López; C.D. Nike Running	3:42.20	Jesús Gómez; C.D. Nike Running	3:42.68	Llorenç Sales; U.A. Montsià	3:42.98
5000 metres	Antonio Abadía; C.D. Nike Running	13:29.37	Sergio Jiménez Vicente; Playas de Castellón	13:32.27	Adel Mechaal; New Balance Team	13:35.93
110 m hurdles (wind: -0.1 m/s)	Orlando Ortega; C.A. Adidas	13.33	Enrique Llopis Doménech; C.A. Gandía	13.85	Luis Salort; Go Fit Athletics	13.97 PB
400 m hurdles	Sergio Fernández; New Balance Team	49.19	Mark Ujakpor; Playas de Castellón	50.42	Ignacio Sarmiento; S.G. Pontevedra	50.57 PB
3000 m s'chase	Fernando Carro; C.D. Nike Running	8:45.88	Daniel Arce; Universidad de Burgos	8:46.17	Ibrahim Ezzaydouny; F.C. Barcelona	3:46.26
10 km walk	Álvaro Martín; Playas de Castellón	39:33.38	Miguel Ángel López; UCAM Murcia	39:35.03	Marc Tur; Peña Santa Eulalia	41:55.24
High jump	Carlos Rojas Lombardo; Unicaja Jaén	2.17 m	Simón Siverio; Tenerife Cajacanarias	2.14 m	Eduard Fábregas; At. Intec-Zoiti	2.14 m
Pole vault	Adrián Vallés; Grupompleo Pamplona At.	5.48 m	Igor Bychkov; Playas de Castellón	5.48 m	Manel Miralles; Playas de Castellón	5.28 m
Long jump	Eusebio Cáceres; Independent	7.95 m (wind: +0.1 m/s)	Héctor Santos Llorente; F.C. Barcelona	7.95 m (wind: 0.0 m/s)	Jean Marie Okutu; F.C. Barcelona	7.55 m (wind: -0.2 m/s)
Triple jump	Jaime Guerra; Cornellá At.	16.45 m PB (wind: -0.2 m/s)	Pablo Torrijos; Playas de Castellón	16.22 m (wind: +1.3 m/s)	Sergio Solanas; A.D. Marathon	16.19 m (wind: -0.5 m/s)
Shot put	Carlos Tobalina; F.C. Barcelona	20.04 m	José Ángel Pinedo; C.A. Fent Camí Mislata	18.91 m	Daniel Pardo González; Playas de Castellón	18.33 m
Discus throw	Lois Maikel Martínez; Playas de Castellón	58.31 m	Juan José Caicedo; C.A. Gandía	58.02 m	Frank Casañas; Independent	57.74 m
Hammer throw	Javier Cienfuegos; Playas de Castellón	78.70 m NR	Alberto González Moyano; Unicaja Jaén	72.75 m	Pedro José Martín Cazalilla; F.C. Barcelona	72.67 m
Javelin throw	Manu Quijera; Grupompleo Pamplona At.	77.39 m	Odei Jainaga; Deportivo Eibar	75.52 m	Nicolás Quijera; Grupompleo Pamplona At.	73.07 m
Decathlon	Pablo Trescolí; Playas de Castellón	7673 pts	Jesús Castillo Patiño; Cornellá At.	7359 pts	Mario Arancón; At. Numantino	7187 pts
4 × 100 m relay	Fútbol Club Barcelona; Joel Ferrando; Ángel David Rodríguez; Pol Retamal; Joan Martínez	39.69	Club de Atletismo Playas de Castellón; Patrick Chinedu Ike; Mauro Triana; Daniel Rodríguez Serrano; Arian Olmos Téllez	40.50	Atletismo Numantino; David José Pineda; Samuel Junior Vargas; Daniel Quero; Mario López	41.09
4 × 400 m relay	Club de Atletismo Playas de Castellón; Alfredo Jiménez Mateo; Alberto Gavaldá; Mark Ujakpor; Luchumbe Kennedy	3:10.35	Real Sociedad de Atletismo; Adrián Rocandio; Diego Cabello; Javier Mariscal Salaverria; Gen Esteban San Millán	3:10.83	Fútbol Club Barcelona; Pau Fradera; Marcel Mondria; Ramón Martínez Bellot; Javier Delgado	3:13.54

=== Women ===
Event	Gold		Silver		Bronze	
100 metres (wind: +0.4 m/s)	Paula Sevilla; Playas de Castellón	11.42	María Isabel Pérez; Valencia Esports	11.42	Carmen Marco; Valencia Esports	11.60 PB
200 metres (wind: -2.7 m/s)	Jaël Bestué; F.C. Barcelona	23.55	Cristina Lara; F.C. Barcelona	23.97	Sonia Molina; Alcampo Scorpio 71	24.10
400 metres	Aauri Bokesa; C.D. Nike Running	53.11	Andrea Jiménez; Playas de Castellón	53.55	Carmen Sánchez Silva; F.C. Barcelona	53.74
800 metres	Natalia Romero; Unicaja Jaén	2:02.88	Marta Frechilla; Playas de Castellón	2:04.81 PB	Victoria Sauleda; Independent	2:06.07
1500 metres	Esther Guerrero; New Balance Team	4:18.18	Marta Pérez; C.A. Adidas	4:20.09	Solange Pereira; Valencia Esports	4:20.73
5000 metres	Maitane Melero; Grupompleo Pamplona At.	16:00.09	Ester Navarrete; F.C. Barcelona	16:03.75	Beatriz Álvarez Díaz; Univ. Estadio Gijón	16:19.24 PB
100 m hurdles (wind: +0.1 m/s)	Teresa Errandonea; Super Amara BAT	13.42	Alba Manzano; A.A. Catalunya	13.97	Estefanía Fortes; A.A. Catalunya	14.01
400 m hurdles	Carmen Romero Gómez; Las Celtíberas	59.03	Sonia Nasarre; ISS L'Hospitalet	59.06	Nerea Bermejo; Grupompleo Pamplona At.	59.77
3000 m s'chase	Irene Sánchez-Escribano; C.A. Adidas	9:43.70	Carolina Robles; Valencia Esports	9:50.91	María José Pérez; Valencia Esports	9:58.04
10 km walk	María Pérez; Valencia Esports	43:52.08 PB	Raquel González; F.C. Barcelona	44:44.32	Laura García-Caro; At. Ciudad de Lepe	46:48.09
High jump	Saleta Fernández; Valencia Esports	1.90 m	Cristina Ferrando; Playas de Castellón	1.85 m	Izaskun Turrillas; Grupompleo Pamplona At.	1.83 m
Pole vault	Miren Bartolomé; Grupompleo Pamplona At.	4.31 m	Mónica Clemente; Avinent Manresa	4.26 m	Andrea San José; F.C. Barcelona	4.06 m
Long jump	Fátima Diame; Valencia Esports	6.48 m (wind: +1.7 m/s)	Cora Salas; C.A. Igualada	6.09 m (wind: +0.3 m/s)	Leticia Gil; Alcampo Scorpio 71	6.03 m (wind: -0.2 m/s)
Triple jump	Ana Peleteiro; C.A. Adidas	14.20 m (wind: +1.0 m/s)	Patricia Sarrapio; Playas de Castellón	14.00 m (wind: +1.8 m/s)	Marina Lobato; Alcampo Scorpio 71	13.42 m (wind: +1.1 m/s)
Shot put	Úrsula Ruiz; Valencia Esports	17.52 m	María Belén Toimil; Playas de Castellón	16.77 m	Ambar del Carmen Sánchez; Playas de Castellón	15.87 m
Discus throw	June Kintana; Grupompleo Pamplona At.	54.56 m	Andrea Alarcón; A.A. Catalunya	48.01 m	Paula Ferrándiz; Playas de Castellón	45.62 m
Hammer throw	Berta Castells; Valencia Esports	67.84 m	Laura Redondo; F.C. Barcelona	64.81 m	Osarumen Odeh; Playas de Castellón	62.30 m
Javelin throw	Arantza Moreno; F.C. Barcelona	56.53 m	Carmen Sánchez Parrondo; Unicaja Jaén	53.78 m PB	Mercedes Chilla; Valencia Esports	51.99 m
Heptathlon	María Vicente; C.D. Nike Running	5615 pts	Valvanuz Cañizo; Bidezabal Durango At.	5495 pts	Mar Vico; F.C. Barcelona	5299 pts
4 × 100 m relay	Fútbol Club Barcelona; Caridad Jerez; Jaël Bestué; Carmen Sánchez Silva; Cristina Lara	44.67	Valencia Club de Atletismo; Carmen Marco; Fátima Diame; Lara Gómez; Maribel Pérez	45.14	Pamplona Atlético; Yaiza Sanz; Nerea Bermejo; Ane Petrirena; Miren Bartolomé	46.94
4 × 400 m relay	Club de Atletismo Playas de Castellón; Bárbara Camblor; Yurena Hueso; Eliani Arletis Casi; Andrea Jiménez	3:44.34	Club de Atletismo Unicaja; Elena María Paulano; Andrea Serrano; Laura Moyano; Natalia Romero	3:47.05	Scorpio 71; María Nieves Mayo; Elisa Cortés; Alicia Leyva; Laura Fernández	3:47.55
