= Estadi Olímpic Camilo Cano =

Sports venue in La Nucia, Spain

Olímpic Camilo Cano
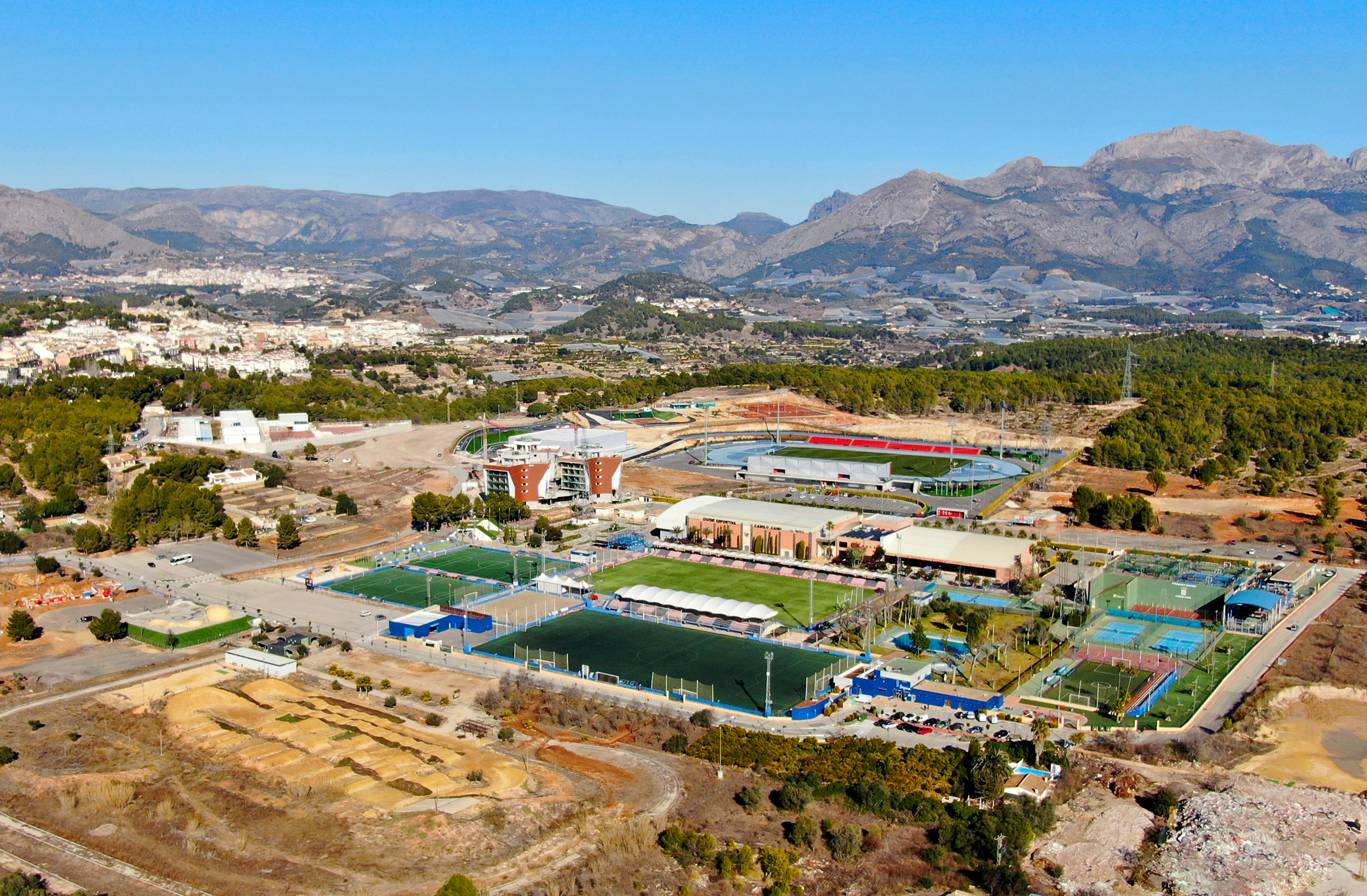
- Camilo Cano Sports City
- Interactive map of Olímpic Camilo Cano
- Location: La Nucia, Spain
- Coordinates: 38°36′16″N 0°7′19″W
- Owner: La Nucía City Council
- Operator: CF La Nucía
- Capacity: 5,000
- Field size: 105 metres (115 yd) x 68 metres (74 yd)

Construction
- Opened: 25 August 2019

Tenants
- CF La Nucía (2019–present); Levante UD (2020)

Estadi Olímpic Camilo Cano is a stadium located in the Spanish town of La Nucía. The venue is part of the Camilo Cano Sports City. The stadium is mainly used for soccer and athletics, and is the home of the CF La Nucía, which plays in the Segunda División B. In addition to functioning as a temporary stadium for the Levante UD during the final part of the 2019–20 La Liga season.

The stadium has a natural grass soccer field with dimensions of 105x68 meters, whose dimensions are similar to those used in the Estadio Santiago Bernabéu and Camp Nou. On the other hand the venue has an eight-lane athletics track, where all athletics competitions can be practiced in various modalities, in events of national and international stature. The stadium has the capacity to hold 5,000 spectators.

In 2019, this stadium was the venue of the 2019 Spanish Athletics Championships.

In 2020, the stadium was used by Levante UD for playing their 2019–20 La Liga matches, behind closed doors, after the COVID-19 pandemic in Spain.
