= Spanish Indoor Athletics Championships =

Track and field sports competition

- Sport: Indoor track and field
- Founded: 1965
- Country: Spain

The Spanish Indoor Athletics Championships (Spanish: Campeonato de España de Atletismo en pista cubierta) is an annual indoor track and field competition organised by the Royal Spanish Athletics Federation (RFEA), which serves as the Spanish national championship for the sport. Typically held over two days in February during the Spanish winter, it was first added to the national calendar in 1965, supplementing the main outdoor Spanish Athletics Championships held in the summer since 1917. It celebrated its 50th edition in 2014.

== Events ==
The following athletics events feature as standard on the Spanish Indoor Championships programme:

- Sprint: 60 m, 200 m, 400 m
- Distance track events: 800 m, 1500 m, 3000 m
- Hurdles: 60 m hurdles
- Jumps: long jump, triple jump, high jump, pole vault
- Throws: shot put
- Combined events: heptathlon (men), pentathlon (women)

At the first three editions, non-standard distances of 600 metres, 1000 metres and 2000 metres were contested. A 5000 m race walk for men was introduced in 1979, while a women's 3000 m walk was contested from 1984. Racewalking events ceased to be part of the national championships after 1994. The men's combined event was an octathlon in 1981, 1982, 1987, 1988 and 1989. Women competed in a sextathlon instead of a pentathlon from 1981 through 1986.

== Editions ==
Edition	Year	Location	Date
I	1965	Madrid	February 27
II	1966	Madrid	February 12
III	1967	Madrid	February 11
IV	1968	Madrid	February 17
V	1969	Barcelona	February 22
VI	1970	Madrid	February 28
VII	1971	Madrid	February 27
VIII	1972	Madrid	February 26
IX	1973	Madrid	February 24
X	1974	Madrid	February 16
XI	1975	Madrid	March 1
XII	1976	Madrid	February 7
XIII	1977	San Sebastián	February 26–27
XIV	1978	Zaragoza	February 24–25
XV	1979	Oviedo	March 3–4
XVI	1980	Oviedo	February 9–10
XVII	1981	San Sebastián	February 7–8
XVIII	1982	Oviedo	February 20–21
XIX	1983	Valencia	February 12–13
XX	1984	San Sebastián	February 11–12
XXI	1985	Madrid	February 15–16
XXII	1986	Madrid	February 7–9
XXIII	1987	San Sebastián	February 7–8
XXIV	1988	Valencia	February 20–21
XXV	1989	Seville	February 4–5
XXVI	1990	San Sebastián	February 17–18
XXVII	1991	Seville	February 16–17
XXVIII	1992	Zaragoza	February 8–9
XXIX	1993	San Sebastián	February 27–28
XXX	1994	Seville	February 26–27
XXXI	1995	Valencia	February 25–26
XXXII	1996	San Sebastián	February 24–25
XXXIII	1997	Valencia	February 22–23
XXXIV	1998	Valencia	February 14–15
XXXV	1999	Seville	February 20–21
XXXVI	2000	San Sebastián	February 12–13
XXXVII	2001	Valencia	February 24–25
XXXVIII	2002	Seville	February 16–17
XXXIX	2003	Valencia	March 1–2
XL	2004	Valencia	February 21–22
XLI	2005	Madrid	February 19–20
XLII	2006	San Sebastián	February 25–26
XLIII	2007	Seville	February 17–18
XLIV	2008	Valencia	February 23–24
XLV	2009	Seville	February 21–22
XLVI	2010	Valencia	February 27–28
XLVII	2011	Valencia	February 19–20
XLVIII	2012	Sabadell	February 25–26
XLIX	2013	Sabadell	February 16–17
L	2014	Sabadell	February 22–23
LI	2015	Antequera	February 21–22
LII	2016	Madrid	March 5–6
LIII	2017	Salamanca	February 18–19
LIV	2018	Valencia	February 17–18
LV	2019	Antequera	February 16–17
LVI	2020	Ourense	29 February – 1 March
LVII	2021	Madrid	February 19–21
LVIII	2022	Ourense	February 25–27
LIX	2023	Madrid	February 17–19
LX	2024		February
LXI	2025	Madrid	February 21–23

== Records ==
=== Men ===
Event	Record	Athlete	Club	Date	Championships	Location	Ref.
60 m	6.58	Venancio José	Valencia Terra i Mar	24 February 2001		Valencia	
200 m	20.65 NR	Adrià Alfonso	Facsa - Playas de Castellón	23 February 2025	2025 Championships	Madrid	
400 m	45.58 NR	Óscar Husillos	F.C. Barcelona	19 February 2023	2023 Championships	Madrid	
800 m	1:47.17	Saúl Ordóñez	New Balance Team	17 February 2018	2018 Championships	Valencia	
1500 m	3:41.37	Jesús Gómez	C.D. Nike Running	17 February 2019	2019 Championships	Antequera	
3000 m	7:42.54	Anacleto Jiménez	Larios A.A.M.	27 February 1994		Seville	
60 m hurdles	7.48 NR	Enrique Llopis		19 February 2023	2023 Championships	Madrid	
High jump	2.31 m	Arturo Ortiz	Larios A.A.M.	18 February 1990		San Sebastián	
Pole vault	5.71 m	José Manuel Arcos	Valencia Terra i Mar	20 February 1999		Seville	
Long jump	8.28 m	Yago Lamela	C.A. Areia	2 March 2003		Valencia	
Triple jump	17.59 m NR	Jordan Díaz		19 February 2023	2023 Championships	Madrid	
Shot put	20.66 m	Borja Vivas	Málaga At.	21 February 2015		Antequera	
Heptathlon	6051 pts	Jorge Ureña	C.E. Colivenc	22 February 2015		Antequera	
Octathlon *	6252 pts	Antonio Peñalver	Alfil Alhama	21 February 1988		Valencia	
5000 m walk *	18:56.41	Miguel Ángel Prieto	Larios A.A.M.	17 February 1991		Seville	

* = No longer contested

=== Women ===
Event	Record	Athlete	Club	Date	Championships	Location	Ref.
60 m	7.15 NR	María Isabel Pérez		23 February 2025	2025 Championships	Madrid	
200 m	23.53	Sandra Myers	M.I. Adidas	25 February 1996		San Sebastián	
400 m	51.89	Sandra Myers	Kelme	17 February 1991		Seville	
800 m	2:00.77	Mayte Martínez	C.A. Adidas	22 February 2004		Valencia	
1500 m	4:07.48	Esther Guerrero	New Balance Team	21 February 2021	2021 Championships	Madrid	
3000 m	8:53.66	Marta Domínguez	Nike Internacional	16 February 2002		Seville	
60 m hurdles	7.95	Glory Alozie	Valencia Terra i Mar	16 February 2002		Seville	
High jump	2.00 m	Ruth Beitia	Valencia Terra i Mar	21 February 2004		Valencia	
Pole vault	4.56 m	Naroa Agirre	At. San Sebastián	17 February 2007		Seville	
Long jump	6.82 m	Niurka Montalvo	Valencia Terra i Mar	25 February 2001		Valencia	
Triple jump	14.37 m	Carlota Castrejana	Valencia Terra i Mar	21 February 2004		Valencia	
Shot put	17.94 m	Martina de la Puente	Esmena Gijón	25 February 1996		San Sebastián	
Pentathlon	4582 pts NR	María Vicente	C.D. Nike Running	25 February 2022	2022 Championships	Ourense	
Pentathlon	60m H / High jump / Shot put / Long jump / 800m; 8.24 / 1.76 m / 12.29 m / 6.59 m / 2:17.16						
Hexathlon *	4936 pts (5015 pts in current tables)	Ana Pérez Carnicero	Valladolid B.I.M.	15 March 1981		Oviedo	
3000 m walk *	12:42.29	Reyes Robrino	C.N. Barcelona	5 February 1989		Seville	

* = No longer contested
