= Ángel Mullera =

Spanish steeplechase runner

Personal information
- Born: 1984 (age 41–42) Lloret de Mar, Catalonia, Spain
Medal record
Men's athletics
Representing Spain
European Championships
Bronze medal – third place	2014 Zürich	3000 m steeplechase

Ángel Mullera (Lloret de Mar 1984-) is a Spanish steeplechaser. Prior to the 2012 Olympic Games, Mullera was thrown out of the Spanish Olympic team for doping offences but later overturned this at the Court of Arbitration for Sport.

In September 2013, it was announced that Mullera had failed a doping test in the 2013 Spanish athletics national championships. The substance allegedly used by the athlete was corticosteroid.
