= Jaël Bestué =

Spanish sprinter (born 2000)

Personal information
- Full name: Jaël-Sakura Bestué Ferrera
- Born: 24 September 2000 (age 25) Barcelona, Spain
- Height: 1.60 m (5 ft 3 in)
- Weight: 55 kg (121 lb)

Sport
- Country: Spain
- Sport: Athletics
- Events: 100 m, 200 m
- Club: FC Barcelona
- Coached by: Ricardo Diéguez
Medal record
Women's athletics
Representing Spain
European Championships
Bronze medal – third place	2026 Birmingham	4 × 100 m mixed
World Relays
Silver medal – second place	2025 Guangzhou	4 × 100 m relay
Bronze medal – third place	2026 Gaborone	4 × 100 m relay
European Games
Bronze medal – third place	2023 Kraków-Małopolska	4 × 100 m relay
European Athletics Team Championships
Gold medal – first place	2025 Madrid	200 m
Silver medal – second place	2025 Madrid	4 × 100 m relay

Jaël-Sakura Bestué Ferrera (born 24 September 2000) is a Spanish sprinter.

== Biography ==
Jaël Bestué was born on 24 September 2000. Her father's family is from Annobón, Equatorial Guinea.

She won a silver medal in the 200 m at the 2017 IAAF World U18 Championships, took bronze in the 100 m at the 2019 European Athletics U20 Championships, and was part of the silver medal-winning team at the 4 × 100 metres relay at the 2021 European Athletics U23 Championships.

At the Spanish national championships she has won four times in the 4 × 100 Metres Relay (2015, 2016, 2019 and 2021), and three times at the 200 m (2018, 2019, and 2020). She also won gold in the 60 m at the 2019 national indoors championship.

Bestué competed in the 200 m at the 2020 Summer Olympics. She recorded a personal best time of 23.19 in finishing fourth in her heat, but did not advance.

== International competitions ==
Year	Competition	Venue	Position	Event	Notes
Representing Spain
2016	European Youth Championships	Tbilisi, Georgia	4th	200 m	24.13
2017	World U18 Championships	Nairobi, Kenya	2nd	200 m	23.61
2017	European U20 Championships	Grosseto, Italy	7th	4 × 100 m relay	45.33
2018	World U20 Championships	Tampere, Finland	11th (sf)	200 m	23.70
2018	European Championships	Berlin, Germany	19th (h)	200 m	23.92
2019	European Indoor Championships	Glasgow, United Kingdom	26th (h)	60 m i	7.41
2019	European U20 Championships	Borås, Sweden	3rd	100 m	11.59
2019	European U20 Championships	Borås, Sweden	—	4 × 100 m relay	DQ
2021	European U23 Championships	Tallinn, Estonia	4th	100 m	11.52
2021	European U23 Championships	Tallinn, Estonia	2nd	4 × 100 m relay	43.74
2021	Olympic Games	Tokyo, Japan	26th (h)	200 m	23.19
2022	World Championships	Eugene, United States	5th	4 × 100 m relay	42.58
2022	European Championships	Munich, Germany	12th (sf)	100 m	11.40
2022	European Championships	Munich, Germany	4th	4 × 100 m relay	43.03
2023	European Indoor Championships	Istanbul, Turkey	8th	60 m i	7.28
2023	European Games	Kraków, Poland	5th	100 m	11.25
2023	European Games	Kraków, Poland	3rd	4 × 100 m relay	43.13
2023	World Championships	Budapest, Hungary	21st (sf)	100 m	11.25
2023	World Championships	Budapest, Hungary	13th (sf)	200 m	22.60
2023	World Championships	Budapest, Hungary	11th (h)	4 × 100 m relay	42.96
2024	World Indoor Championships	Glasgow, United Kingdom	19th (sf)	60 m i	7.24
2024	World Relays	Nassau, Bahamas	7th (h)	4 × 100 m relay	42.85
2024	European Championships	Rome, Italy	7th	200 m	22.93
2024	European Championships	Rome, Italy	5th	4 × 100 m relay	42.84
2024	Olympic Games	Paris, France	41st (h)	200 m	23.22
2024	Olympic Games	Paris, France	11th (h)	4 × 100 m relay	42.77
2025	European Indoor Championships	Apeldoorn, Netherlands	16th (sf)	60 m i	7.22
2025	World Relays	Guangzhou, China	2nd	4 × 100 m relay	42.28
2025	European Athletics Team Championships	Madrid, Spain	1st	200 m	22.19
2025	European Athletics Team Championships	Madrid, Spain	2nd	4 × 100 m relay	42.11
2025	World Championships	Tokyo, Japan	16th (sf)	200 m	22.80
2025	World Championships	Tokyo, Japan	5th	4 × 100 m relay	42.47
2026	World Indoor Championships	Toruń, Poland	23rd (sf)	60 m	7.27
2026	European Championships	Birmingham, United Kingdom	7th	200 m	22.69
2026	European Championships	Birmingham, United Kingdom	—	4 × 100 m relay	DNF
2026	European Championships	Birmingham, United Kingdom	3rd	4 × 100 m mixed relay	40.42
2026	World Ultimate Championship	Budapest, Hungary	9th (h)	200 m	22.68
