= Spanish Athletics Championships =

Annual athletics competition in Spain

- Current season, competition or edition: 2026 Spanish Athletics Championships
- Sport: Athletics
- Founded: 1917
- Country: Spain

The Spanish Athletics Championships (Spanish: Campeonato de España de atletismo) is an annual outdoor track and field competition organised by the Royal Spanish Athletics Federation (RFEA), which serves as the Spanish national championship for the sport. It is typically held as a two-day event in the Spanish summer around late June to early August. The venue of the championships is decided on an annual basis.

The competition was first held in 1917 as a men's only competition. A separate women's began in 1931 but, following the onset of the Spanish Civil War, this was cancelled after 1935 and it was not until 1963 that women events were added alongside the men's programme. This made Spain the last large European country to provide a national championship for women in the sport and female participation in sport in general in Spain was low due to a lack of physical education, facilities and funding for women's sport. This stemmed from the policy of National Catholicism, which saw women's place as caregivers and physical feats by them as a challenge to morality.

The championships has been held every year since its inauguration with the exception of 1922 and three years during the civil war (1937, 1938, and 1939). The modern event is used for the Spanish international selection for major athletics events, including the Olympic Games, World Championships in Athletics and European Athletics Championships.

== Events ==
On the current programme a total of 38 individual Spanish Championship athletics events are contested, divided evenly between men and women. For each of the sexes, there are six track running events, three obstacle events, four jumps, four throws, and two relays.

Track running

- 100 metres, 200 metres, 400 metres, 800 metres, 1500 metres, 5000 metres

Obstacle events

- 100 metres hurdles (women only), 110 metres hurdles (men only), 400 metres hurdles, 3000 metres steeplechase

Jumping events

- Pole vault, high jump, long jump, triple jump

Throwing events

- Shot put, discus throw, javelin throw, hammer throw

Relays

- 4 × 100 metres relay, 4 × 400 metres relay

A men's barra vasca competition was held up to 1963 – the event being a variation of the javelin throw, but the spear was thrown by a technique of spinning while holding it at the hip. This was banned to preserve public safety, as a result of errant throws.

In spite of the prevention of women for competing at the national championships for such a long period, the women's programme subsequently expanded in line with international developments. The first addition was a women's pentathlon in 1965 (later being replaced by the heptathlon in 1981). A women's 1500 m was added in 1969, a 3000 metres in 1974 (held until 1994), a 5000 m in 1982, then a 10,000 m in 1984. The women's 80 metres hurdles was extended to the 100 m distance in 1969 and the 400 m hurdles emerged in 1977. A women's 5000 m track walk was first featured in 1982 and extended to the full 10,000 m distance in 1990. The field events programme expanded in the 1990s, with the addition of the triple jump in 1990, pole vault in 1994, and hammer throw in 1995. Women finally achieved parity with men in the track and field programme with the addition of the steeplechase in 2001.

Spanish championships in 10K run, half marathon, marathon, 100 kilometres run, cross country running, mountain running and road walking are held separately from the main track and field championships. There is also a Spanish Athletics Club Championships for athletics clubs, which was first held in 1958 for men and 1966 for women.

== Editions ==
=== Women-only ===
Edition	Year	Location	Dates	Venue
1	1931	Madrid	24–25 October	Campo de la Sociedad Atlética de Madrid
2	1932	Barcelona	8–9 October	Estadio de Montjuïc
3	1933	Barcelona	8 October	Estadio de Montjuïc
4	1935	Barcelona	7 July	Estadio de Montjuïc

=== Men/unified championships ===
Edition	Year	Location	Dates	Venue
1	1917	San Sebastián	8–10 September	Estadio de Atocha
2	1918	Madrid	12–13 October	Campo del Athletic Club de Madrid
3	1919	Barcelona	18–19 October	Velódromo Campo de Deportes
4	1920	San Sebastián	24–25 July	Estadio de Atocha
5	1921	Vigo	16 October	Estadio de Coya
6	1923	Las Arenas-Gecho	12–15 August	Estadio de Romo
7	1924	Tolosa	24–25 May	Estadio de Berazubi
8	1925	Tolosa	25–26 July	Estadio de Berazubi
9	1926	Tolosa	31 July–1 August	Estadio de Berazubi
10	1927	Madrid	25–26 June	Estadio Metropolitano de Madrid
11	1928	Reus	30 June–1 July	Estadio del Reus Deportiu
12	1929	Barcelona	29–30 June	Estadio de Montjuïc
13	1930	Barcelona	5–6 June	Estadio de Montjuïc
14	1931	Barcelona	25–26 July	Estadio de Montjuïc
15	1932	Tolosa	30–31 July	Estadio de Berazubi
16	1933	Barcelona	12–13 August	Estadio de Montjuïc
17	1934	Tolosa	4–5 August	Estadio de Berazubi
18	1935	Tolosa	24–25 August	Estadio de Berazubi
19	1936	Barcelona	11–12 July	Estadio de Montjuïc
20	1940	Barcelona	27–28 July	Estadio de Montjuïc
21	1941	Valencia	26–27 July	Campo de Vallejo
22	1942	Madrid	28–29 June	Pistas de la Ciudad Universitaria
23	1943	Barcelona	24–25 July	Estadio de Montjuïc
24	1944	Tolosa	30–31 July	Estadio de Berazubi
25	1945	Girona	28–29 July	Pista de la Dehesa
26	1946	Barcelona	20–21 July	Estadio de Montjuïc
27	1947	Barcelona	26–27 July	Estadio de Montjuïc
28	1948	Avilés	10–11 July	Pista de la Exposición
29	1949	Barcelona	9–10 July	Estadio de Montjuïc
30	1950	Burgos	10–11 July	Pista de la Ciudad Deportiva General Yagüe
31	1951	Barcelona	28–29 July	Estadio de Montjuïc
32	1952	Avilés	12–13 July	Pista de la Exposición
33	1953	San Sebastián	25–26 July	Pista de Anoeta
34	1954	Tetuán	10–11 July	Stade Saniat Rmel
35	1955	Barcelona	9–10 July	Estadio de Montjuïc
36	1956	Oviedo	21–22 July	Estadio Cristo de las Cadenas
37	1957	A Coruña	20–21 July	Estadio Riazor
38	1958	San Sebastián	12–13 July	Pista de Anoeta
39	1959	Tolosa	18–19 July	Estadio de Berazubi
40	1960	Barcelona	30–31 July	Estadio de Montjuïc & Estadio de la Ciudad Universitaria
41	1961	Barcelona	14–15 August	Estadio de Montjuïc
42	1962	A Coruña	18–19 August	Estadio Riazor
43	1963	Barcelona	17–18 August	Estadio de Montjuïc
44	1964	Madrid	19–20 September	Estadio de Vallehermoso
45	1965	Madrid	17–18 July	Estadio de Vallehermoso
46	1966	Madrid	17–18 September	Estadio de Vallehermoso
47	1967	Madrid	23–24 September	Estadio de Vallehermoso
48	1968	Madrid	13–14 July	Estadio de Vallehermoso
49	1969	Madrid	5–6 July	Estadio de Vallehermoso
50	1970	Madrid	10–12 July	Estadio de Vallehermoso
51	1971	Madrid	9–11 July	Estadio de Vallehermoso
52	1972	Madrid	7–9 July	Estadio de Vallehermoso
53	1973	Barcelona	13–15 July	Estadio de la Ciudad Universitaria
54	1974	Madrid	19–21 July	Estadio de Vallehermoso
55	1975	San Sebastián	1–3 August	Pista de Anoeta
56	1976	Madrid	27–29 June	Estadio de Vallehermoso
57	1977	Granollers	23–25 July	Estadio Municipal de Granollers
58	1978	Madrid	28–30 July	Estadio de Vallehermoso
59	1979	Barcelona	10–12 August	Estadi Municipal Joan Serrahima
60	1980	Madrid	22–24 August	Pista del I.N.E.F.
61	1981	Barcelona	7–9 August	Estadi Municipal Joan Serrahima
62	1982	Santiago de Compostela	6–8 August	Ciudad Universitaria
63	1983	San Sebastián	22–24 July	Pista de Anoeta
64	1984	Barcelona	29 June–1 July	Estadi Municipal Joan Serrahima
65	1985	Gijón	2–4 August	Las Mestas
66	1986	Madrid	1–3 August	Estadio de Vallehermoso
67	1987	Barcelona	14–16 August	Estadi Municipal Joan Serrahima
68	1988	Vigo	11–14 August	Estadio de Balaídos
69	1989	Barcelona	11–13 August	Estadio de Montjuïc
70	1990	Jerez de la Frontera	10–12 August	Estadio Municipal de Chapín
71	1991	Barcelona	2–4 August	Estadio de Montjuïc
72	1992	Valencia	26–28 June	Cauce del Río Turia
73	1993	Gandía	2–4 July	Polideportivo Municipal
74	1994	San Sebastián	15–17 July	Estadio de Anoeta
75	1995	Madrid	21–23 July	Estadio Olímpico de Madrid
76	1996	Málaga	28–29 June	Ciudad Deportiva de Carranque
77	1997	Salamanca	19–20 July	Estadio Javier Sotomayor
78	1998	San Sebastián	1–2 August	Estadio de Anoeta
79	1999	Sevilla	24–25 July	Estadio de la Cartuja
80	2000	Barcelona	2–3 September	Estadio de Montjuïc
81	2001	Valencia	21–22 July	Pista Jardín del Turia
82	2002	Salamanca	20–21 July	Estadio Javier Sotomayor
83	2003	Jerez de la Frontera	2–3 August	Estadio Municipal de Chapín
84	2004	Almería	31 July–1 August	Estadio de los Juegos Mediterráneos
85	2005	Málaga	23–24 July	Estadio Ciudad de Málaga
86	2006	Zaragoza	22–23 July	Centro Aragonés del Deporte
87	2007	San Sebastián	4–5 July	Estadio de Anoeta
88	2008	Santa Cruz de Tenerife	26–27 July	Centro Insular de Atletismo de Tenerife
89	2009	Barcelona	1–2 August	Estadio de Montjuic
90	2010	Avilés	17–18 July	Complejo Deportivo Avilés
91	2011	Málaga	6–7 August	Estadio Ciudad de Málaga
92	2012	Pamplona	25–26 August	Estadio Larrabide
93	2013	Alcobendas	27–28 July	Polideportivo José Caballero
94	2014	Alcobendas	26–27 July	Polideportivo José Caballero
95	2015	Castellón de la Plana	1–2 August	Pista Municipal Gaetá Huguet
96	2016	Gijón	23–24 July	Complejo Deportivo Las Mestas
97	2017	Barcelona	22–23 July	Estadi Municipal Joan Serrahima
98	2018	Getafe	21–22 July	Polideportivo Juan de la Cierva
99	2019	La Nucia	31 August and 1 September	Ciudad Deportiva Camilo Cano
100	2020	various	12–13 September	various
101	2021	Getafe	26–27 June	Polideportivo Juan de la Cierva
102	2022	Nerja	25–26 June	Estadio Enrique Lopez Cuenca
103	2023	Torrent	29–30 July	Pista Parc Central

== Championships records ==
=== Men ===
Event	Record	Athlete/Team	Date	Meet	Place	Ref.
800 m	1:45.82	Alvaro de Arriba	26 June 2022	2022 Championships	Nerja	
Triple jump	17.87 m (+1.2 m/s) NR	Jordan Díaz	26 June 2022	2022 Championships	Nerja	

=== Women ===
Event	Record	Athlete/Team	Date	Meet	Place	Ref.
100 m hurdles	11.07 (+1.6 m/s)	María Isabel Pérez	26 June 2022	2022 Championships	Nerja	
400 m hurdles	54.34 NR	Sara Gallego	26 June 2022	2022 Championships	Nerja	
Triple jump	14.61 m (−0.8 m/s)	Ana Peleteiro	27 June 2021	2021 Championships	Getafe	
Shot put	18.28 m NR	Úrsula Ruiz	22 July 2017	2017 Championships	Barcelona	
10,000 m walk (track)	42:12.93	María Pérez	25 July 2026	2026 Championships	Málaga	

== See also ==
- List of Spanish records in athletics
