= Fátima Diame =

Spanish athlete (born 1996)

Personal information
- Full name: Fátima Diame Diame
- Born: 22 September 1996 (age 29) Valencia, Spain
- Height: 1.70 m (5 ft 7 in)
- Weight: 52 kg (115 lb)

Sport
- Sport: Athletics
- Events: Long jump, Triple jump
- Club: Valencia Esports
- Coached by: Iván Pedroso
Medal record
Women's Athletics
Representing Spain
World Indoor Championships
Bronze medal – third place	2024 Glasgow	Long jump
Bronze medal – third place	2025 Nanjing	Long jump
Mediterranean Games
Bronze medal – third place	2018 Tarragona	Long jump
Bronze medal – third place	2018 Tarragona	Triple jump

Fátima Diame Diame (born 22 September 1996) is a Spanish athlete specializing in the long jump and triple jump. At the age of 17, she became the Spanish national indoor champion in both the long jump and the 60 meters. Diame competed at the 2020 Summer Olympics and won a bronze medal in the long jump at the 2024 World Indoor Championships.

== Professional career ==
Diame was trained at Valencia's Esports Academy and made her professional debut in 2013 at the World Youth Championships in Donetsk. In 2015, she won a bronze medal in Long jump at the European Junior Championships which took place in Eskilstuna, Sweden.

She followed up her success in Sweden by winning a gold medal in 2018 at the Mediterranean Athletics U23 Championships in Jesolo, Italy jumping at a record 13.82m. That same year, she further won two bronze medals: one at the Mediterranean Games in Tarragona, Spain and the other at the Ibero American Championships in Trujillo, Peru.

The highlight of Diame's career came in summer of 2021, when she represented Spain at the Olympic Games in Tokyo, Japan. She finished in 21st place.

In 2022, Diame won a gold medal at the Spanish Indoors Championships.

She competed at the 2024 World Athletics Indoor Championships in Glasgow where she won the bronze medal in the long jump event.

== Personal life ==
Diame was born in Valencia, Spain to Senegalese immigrant parents.

Diame is a sponsored Adidas Athlete.

In February 2026, she confirmed her relationship with former footballer Miguel Ángel Moyá, sharing several photos on social media.

== International competitions ==
Year	Competition	Venue	Position	Event	Notes
Representing Spain
2013	World Youth Championships	Donetsk, Ukraine	13th (q)	Long jump	5.98 m
2014	World Junior Championships	Eugene, United States	15th (q)	Long jump	6.00 m
2015	European Junior Championships	Eskilstuna, Sweden	3rd	Long jump	6.55 m
2016	Mediterranean U23 Championships	Radès, Tunisia	6th	Long jump	5.94 m
2017	European U23 Championships	Bydgoszcz, Poland	23rd (q)	Long jump	6.03 m
2017	European U23 Championships	Bydgoszcz, Poland	5th	Triple jump	13.60 m
2017	World Championships	London, United Kingdom	25th (q)	Triple jump	13.36 m
2018	Mediterranean U23 Championships	Jesolo, Italy	2nd	Long jump	6.15 m
2018	Mediterranean U23 Championships	Jesolo, Italy	1st	Triple jump	13.82 m
2018	Mediterranean Games	Tarragona, Spain	3rd	Long jump	6.68 m
2018	Mediterranean Games	Tarragona, Spain	3rd	Triple jump	13.92 m
2018	European Championships	Berlin, Germany	22nd (q)	Long jump	6.24 m
2018	Ibero-American Championships	Trujillo, Peru	3rd	Long jump	6.51 m (w)
2019	European Indoor Championships	Glasgow, United Kingdom	9th (q)	Long jump i	6.46 m
2021	European Indoor Championships	Toruń, Poland	7th	Long jump i	6.47 m
2021	Olympic Games	Tokyo, Japan	21st (q)	Long jump	6.32 m
2022	World Indoor Championships	Belgrade, Serbia	7th	Long jump i	6.71 m
2022	Ibero-American Championships	La Nucía, Spain	1st	Long jump	6.65 m
2022	World Championships	Eugene, United States	16th (q)	Long jump	6.54 m
2023	European Indoor Championships	Istanbul, Turkey	10th (q)	Long jump i	6.48 m
2023	World Championships	Budapest, Hungary	6th	Long jump	6.82 m
2024	World Indoor Championships	Glasgow, United Kingdom	3rd	Long jump i	6.78 m
2024	European Championships	Rome, Italy	8th	Long jump	6.69 m
2024	Olympic Games	Paris, France	15th (q)	Long jump	6.52 m
2025	European Indoor Championships	Apeldoorn, Netherlands	5th	Long jump i	6.73 m
2025	World Indoor Championships	Nanjing, China	3rd	Long jump i	6.72 m
2026	European Championships	Birmingham, United Kingdom	6th	Long jump	6.80 m (w)

== National titles ==
- Spanish Athletics Championships
  - Long jump: 2019
- Spanish Indoor Athletics Championships
  - Long jump: 2014, 2018, 2020, 2021, 2022
  - 60 metres: 2014

== Personal bests ==
Outdoor

- Long jump – 6.82 (+2.0 m/s, Budapest 2023)
- Triple jump – 14.03 (+0.4 m/s, Torrent 2017)

Indoor

- Long jump – 6.78 (Glasgow 2024)
- Triple jump – 13.92 (Valencia 2020)
