= Ana Lozano =

Spanish long-distance runner

Personal information
- Nationality: Spanish
- Born: 22 February 1991 (age 35)
- Height: 1.66 m (5 ft 5 in)
- Weight: 49 kg (108 lb)

Sport
- Sport: Long-distance running
- Event: 5000 metres
Medal record
Women's Athletics
Representing Spain
Mediterranean Games
Bronze medal – third place	Tarragona 2018	5000 m

Ana Lozano del Campo (born 22 February 1991) is a Spanish long-distance runner. She competed in the women's 5000 metres at the 2017 World Championships in Athletics.

== International competitions ==
Year	Competition	Venue	Position	Event	Notes
Representing Spain
2017	European Indoor Championships	Belgrade, Serbia	6th	3000 m	8:55.20
2017	World Cross Country Championships	Kampala, Uganda	42nd	10 km	36:03
2017	World Championships	London, United Kingdom	20th (h)	5000 m	15:14.23
2018	Mediterranean Games	Tarragona, Spain	3rd	5000 m	16:00.17
