= Elena Moreno =

Chilean actress (1892-1974)

- Born: June 12, 1892; Santiago, Chile
- Died: November 2, 1974 (aged 82); Santiago, Chile
- Occupation(s): Theater, radio and film actress

Elena Moreno (June 12, 1892–November 2, 1974) was a Chilean actress. She was a theater and film actress, whose career spanned over 40 years.

== Early life ==
Moreno lost her two parents at a young age. She got married and then became a widow, also at a young age. Moreno decided to study business, but she became interested in acting instead.

== Acting career ==
Against her family's wishes, Moreno debuted as an actress in 1925's play "El Padrón Municipal", a participation which garnered her praise from critics. In 1930, she formed an acting and singing troupe, with which she embarked on a tour of South America.

Moreno did not act in any films until 1946's "Memorias de un Chofer de Taxi" ("A Taxi Driver's Memories") and "El Padre Pitillo" ("Father Cigarette"). She made a number of films during the 1950s, but it wasn't until the 1960s that her film acting career took off. While the most famous movie she participated at was probably 1951's Uno Que ha Sido Marino, (One Who's Been a Sailor), she featured prominently in a number of Chilean films during the 1960s and 1970s, including 1962's "El Cuerpo y la Sangre" ("Body and Blood"), 1964's "El Burocrata Gonzalez" ("Bureaucrat Gonzalez"), 1965's Angelito ("Little Angel") and "Más Allá de Pilpico" ("Beyond Pilpico"), 1968's "Tierra Quemada" ("Burned Ground"), 1969's "Valparaíso mi Amor" ("Valparaiso, my Love"), 1970's "La Araucana" ("The Araucana Girl"), 1971's 'Los Testigos" ("The Witnesses"), "El Afuerino" ("The Outsider") and her last film, "Con el Santo y la Limosna" ("With the Saint and the Alms"), which was also filmed in 1971.

Contiguously to her film acting career, she also kept acting on theater, and in 1959, she acted in "El DIario de las Carmelitas" ("The Carmelitas' Diary"). In 1962, she starred in "Dionisio", a play that was produced by Alejandro Sieveking and directed by Eugenio Dittborn. In 1966, she acted in Fernando Cuadras' play, "La Niňa en la Palomera" ("The Girl on the Bleak Place").

At some point in her career, Moreno was also a radio actress.

== Death ==
Moreno died on November 2, 1974, at the age of 82. She had spent months in a hospital, suffering of an unspecified illness that she had contracted while she was participating in a theatrical play named "Homo Chilensis"

== See also ==
- List of Chileans
