= Teresa Errandonea =

Spanish hurdler

Personal information
- Full name: Teresa Errandonea Fernández de Barrena
- Nationality: Spanish
- Born: 15 November 1994 (age 31) Irun, Gipuzkoa, Spain
- Height: 173 cm (5 ft 8 in)
- Weight: 65 kg (143 lb)

Sport
- Sport: Athletics
- Event: 100 metres hurdles

Teresa Errandonea Fernández de Barrena (Note: In this Spanish name, the first or paternal surname is Errandonea and the second or maternal family name is Fernández de Barrena.) (born 15 November 1994) is a Spanish athlete. She competed in the women's 100 metres hurdles event at the 2020 Summer Olympics.
