= Aauri Bokesa =

Spanish sprinter (born 1988)

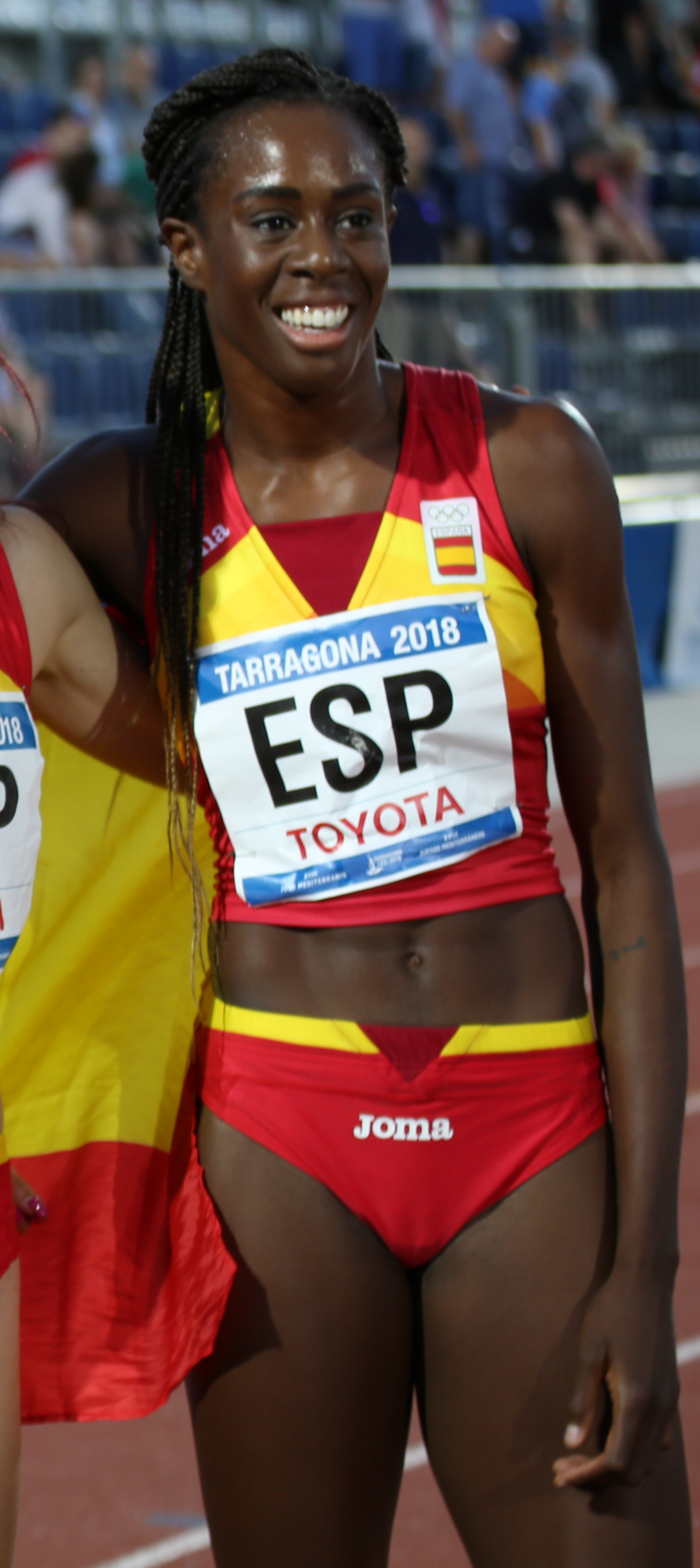
- Bokesa in 2018

Personal information
- Full name: Aauri Lorena Bokesa Abia
- Nationality: Spanish
- Born: 14 December 1988 (age 37) Madrid, Spain
- Height: 1.83 m (6 ft 0 in)
- Weight: 66 kg (146 lb)

Sport
- Country: Spain
- Sport: Athletics
- Event: 400m

Aauri Lorena Bokesa Abia (born 14 December 1988) is a Spanish sprinter who specializes in the 400 metres. She represented Spain at the 2012 Summer Olympics where she was 6th in Round 1 with a time of 53.67. At the 2016 Olympics, she was 6th again in her first round heat, in a time of 53.51. Bokesa also plays basketball for the women's counterpart of CB Estudiantes.

== Competition record ==
Year	Competition	Venue	Position	Event	Notes
Representing Spain
2009	European U23 Championships	Kaunas, Lithuania	6th (S)	400 m	54.25
2010	Ibero-American Championships	San Fernando, Spain	11th (h)	400 m	56.05
2010	Ibero-American Championships	San Fernando, Spain	4th	4 × 400 m relay	3:37.49
2011	Universiade	Shenzhen, China	15th	400 m	54.09
2012	European Championships	Helsinki, Finland	10th	400 m	52.47
2012	European Championships	Helsinki, Finland	13th	4 × 400 m relay	3:38.00
2012	Olympic Games	London, United Kingdom	6th (h)	400 m	53.67
2013	European Indoor Championships	Gothenburg, Sweden	14th (h)	400 m	53.61
2013	World Championships	Moscow, Russia	17th	400 m	51.94
2014	European Championships	Zürich, Switzerland	8th	400 m	52.39
2015	European Indoor Championships	Prague, Czech Republic	16th (h)	400 m	53.80
2015	World Championships	Beijing, China	38th (h)	400 m	52.98
2016	European Championships	Amsterdam, Netherlands	10th	400 m	52.39
2016	European Championships	Amsterdam, Netherlands	14th	4 × 400 m relay	3:33.57
2016	Olympic Games	Rio de Janeiro, Brazil	6th (h)	400 m	53.51
2017	European Indoor Championships	Belgrade, Serbia	15th	400 m	53.80
2018	Mediterranean Games	Tarragona, Spain	3rd	4 × 400 m relay	3:31.54
2018	European Championships	Berlin, Germany	11th (h)	4 × 400 m relay	3:33.18
2019	European Indoor Championships	Glasgow, United Kingdom	23rd (h)	400 m	53.45
2021	European Indoor Championships	Toruń, Poland	31st (h)	400 m	53.64
2021	World Relays	Chorzów, Poland	6th	Mixed 4 × 400 m relay	3:19.65
2021	Olympic Games	Tokyo, Japan	21st (sf)	400 m	51.57
2021	Olympic Games	Tokyo, Japan	9th (h)	Mixed 4 × 400 m relay	3:09.14
2022	World Championships	Eugene, United States	13th (h)	4 × 400 m relay	3:32.87
2022	European Championships	Munich, Germany	8th	4 × 400 m relay	3:29.70

== Personal life ==
Bokesa's parents are from Basacato del Este, Bioko Norte Province, Equatorial Guinea.
