= List of 200 metres national champions (men) =

Below a list of all national champions in the men's 200 metres in track and field from several countries since 1970.

== Argentina ==
- 1970: Andrés Calonge
- 1971: Pedro Bassart
- 1972: José Pérez Ferrería
- 1973: Carlos Bertotti
- 1974: Alfredo Milano
- 1975: Gustavo Dubarbier
- 1976: Gustavo Dubarbier
- 1977: Gustavo Dubarbier
- 1978: Carlos Gambetta
- 1979: Carlos Gambetta
- 1980: Eduardo Oscar de Brito
- 1981: Nicolás Duncan Glass
- 1982: Ernesto Braun
- 1983: Alfredo Muro
- 1984: Oscar Barrionuevo
- 1985: Oscar Barrionuevo
- 1986: Gerardo Meinardi
- 1987: Gabriel Somma
- 1988: Claudio Arcas
- 1989: Carlos Gats
- 1990: Alejandro Terzián
- 1991: José María Beduino
- 1992: Carlos Gats
- 1993: Carlos Gats
- 1994: Carlos Gats
- 1995: Guillermo Cacían
- 1996: Guillermo Cacían
- 1997: Carlos Gats
- 1998: Damián Spector
- 1999: Matías Fayos
- 2000: Nicolás Arias Duval
- 2001: Matías Fayos
- 2002: Matías Usandivaras
- 2003: Matías Usandivaras
- 2004: Matías Usandivaras
- 2005: Iván Altamirano
- 2006: Iván Altamirano

== Australia ==
- 1970: Peter Norman
- 1971: Bruce Weatherlake
- 1972: Greg Lewis
- 1973: Greg Lewis
- 1974: Richard Hopkins
- 1975: Peter Fitzgerald
- 1976: Greg Lewis
- 1977: Colin McQueen
- 1978: Colin McQueen
- 1979: Colin McQueen
- 1980: Bruce Frayne
- 1981: Bruce Frayne
- 1982: Peter Gandy
- 1983: Bruce Frayne
- 1984: Peter van Miltenberg
- 1985: Clayton Kearney
- 1986: Robert Stone
- 1987: John Dinan
- 1988: Kieran Finn (IRL)
- 1989: Darren Clark
- 1990: Robert Stone
- 1991: Dean Capobianco
- 1992: Dean Capobianco
- 1993: Damien Marsh
- 1994: Steve Brimacombe
- 1995: Steve Brimacombe
- 1996: Dean Capobianco
- 1997: Chris Donaldson (NZL)
- 1998: Damien Marsh
- 1999: Chris Donaldson (NZL)
- 2000: Darryl Wohlsen
- 2001: Patrick Johnson
- 2002: David Geddes
- 2003: Patrick Johnson
- 2004: Ambroze Ezenwa (NGR)
- 2005: Daniel Batman
- 2006: Patrick Johnson
- 2007: Joshua Ross
- 2008: Daniel Batman
- 2009: Aaron Rouge-Serret
- 2010: Patrick Johnson
- 2011: Aaron Rouge-Serret
- 2012: Joseph Millar (NZL)
- 2013: Josh Ross
- 2014: Mangar Makur Chuot
- 2015: Banuve Tabakaucoro (FIJ)
- 2016: Alexander Hartmann

== Bahamas ==
- 2004: Dominic Demeritte
- 2006: Chris Brown
- 2007: Michael Mathieu
- 2008: Jamial Rolle
- 2009: Jamial Rolle
- 2010: Jamial Rolle
- 2011: Michael Mathieu
- 2012: Trevorvano Mackey
- 2013: Trevorvano Mackey
- 2014: Shavez Hart
- 2015: Shavez Hart

== Belarus ==
- 1992: Sergey Kornelyuk
- 1993: Leonid Safronnikov
- 1994: Leonid Safronnikov
- 1995: Sergey Kornelyuk
- 1996: Leonid Safronnikov
- 1997: Andrey Gavrilenko (UKR)
- 1998: Dmitriy Kotenkov
- 1999: Aleksandr Slyunkov
- 2000: ???
- 2001: Aleksandr Slyunkov
- 2002: Vitaliy Chechetko
- 2003: Maksim Pisunov
- 2004: Maksim Sidorenko
- 2005: Maksim Pisunov
- 2006: Maksim Pisunov

== Belgium ==
- 1970: Paul Poels
- 1971: Jean-Pierre Borlée
- 1972: Freddy Lucq
- 1973: Guy Stas
- 1974: Fons Brydenbach
- 1975: Fons Brydenbach
- 1976: Reno Roelandt
- 1977: Lambert Micha
- 1978: Reno Roelandt
- 1979: Jacques Borlée
- 1980: Frank Verhelst
- 1981: Jacques Borlée
- 1982: Kris Poté
- 1983: Jacques Borlée
- 1984: Jacques Borlée
- 1985: Jeroen Fischer
- 1986: Ronald Desruelles
- 1987: Jeroen Fischer
- 1988: Patrick Stevens
- 1989: Patrick Stevens
- 1990: Patrick Stevens
- 1991: Jeroen Fischer
- 1992: Patrick Stevens
- 1993: Patrick Stevens
- 1994: Patrick Stevens
- 1995: Erik Wijmeersch
- 1996: Patrick Stevens
- 1997: Erik Wijmeersch
- 1998: Erik Wijmeersch
- 1999: Erik Wijmeersch
- 2000: Patrick Stevens
- 2001: Erik Wijmeersch
- 2002: Cédric Van Branteghem
- 2003: Cédric Van Branteghem
- 2004: Anthony Ferro
- 2005: Kristof Beyens
- 2006: Cédric Van Branteghem
- 2007: Anthony Ferro
- 2008: Arnout Matthijs
- 2009: Kevin Borlée
- 2010: Joris Haeck
- 2011: Kevin Borlée
- 2012: Jonathan Borlée
- 2013: Jonathan Borlée
- 2014: Arnout Matthijs
- 2015: Arnout Matthijs
- 2015: Arnout Matthijs

== Brazil ==
- 1991: Robson da Silva
- 1992: Robson da Silva
- 1993: Robson da Silva
- 1994: Robson da Silva
- 1995: Robson da Silva
- 1996: Claudinei da Silva
- 1997: André da Silva
- 1998: Claudinei da Silva
- 1999: Claudinei da Silva
- 2000: Claudinei da Silva
- 2001: André da Silva
- 2002: Vicente de Lima
- 2003: André da Silva
- 2004: André da Silva
- 2005: Vicente de Lima
- 2006: Basílio de Moraes
- 2007: Sandro Viana
- 2008: Sandro Viana
- 2009: Hugo de Sousa
- 2010: Jefferson Liberato Lucindo
- 2011: Bruno de Barros
- 2012: Bruno de Barros
- 2013: Bruno de Barros
- 2014: Aldemir da Silva Júnior
- 2015: Aldemir da Silva Júnior

== Canada ==
- 1970: Charlie Francis
- 1971: Charlie Francis
- 1972: Robert Martin
- 1973: Robert Martin
- 1974: Robert Martin
- 1975: Hugh Fraser
- 1976: Dacre Brown
- 1977: Desai Williams
- 1978: Dan Biocchi
- 1979: Desai Williams
- 1980: Desai Williams
- 1981: Desai Williams
- 1982: Desai Williams
- 1983: Desai Williams
- 1984: Tony Sharpe
- 1985: Ben Johnson
- 1986: Atlee Mahorn
- 1987: Ben Johnson
- 1988: Cyprean Enweani
- 1989: Cyprean Enweani
- 1990: Bradley McCuaig
- 1991: Atlee Mahorn
- 1992: Ricardo Greenidge
- 1993: Glenroy Gilbert
- 1994: Robert Esmie
- 1995: Atlee Mahorn
- 1996: Dave Tomlin
- 1997: Robert Esmie
- 1998: O'Brian Gibbons
- 1999: Glenn Smith
- 2000: Pierre Browne
- 2001: Shane Niemi
- 2002: Jermaine Joseph
- 2003: Nicolas Macrozonaris
- 2004: Anson Henry
- 2005: Anson Henry
- 2006: Bryan Barnett
- 2007: Bryan Barnett
- 2008: Jared Connaughton
- 2009: Bryan Barnett
- 2010: Jared Connaughton
- 2011: Bryan Barnett
- 2012: Tremaine Harris
- 2013: Tremaine Harris
- 2014: Brendon Rodney
- 2015: Aaron Brown

== Denmark ==
- 1970: Søren Viggo Pedersen
- 1971: Søren Viggo Pedersen
- 1972: Søren Viggo Pedersen
- 1973: Søren Viggo Pedersen
- 1974: Søren Viggo Pedersen
- 1975: Jens Hansen
- 1976: Ole Lysholt
- 1977: Jens Hansen
- 1978: Frank Foli-Andersen
- 1979: Jens Smedegård (Hansen)
- 1980: ???
- 1981: Jesper Carlsen
- 1982: ???
- 1983: Lars Pedersen
- 1984: Peter Regli
- 1985: Lars Pedersen
- 1986: Lars Pedersen
- 1987: Morten Kjems
- 1988: Lars Pedersen
- 1989: Lars Pedersen
- 1990: Miels Ole Lindberg
- 1991: Lars Pedersen
- 1992: Lars Pedersen
- 1993: Lars Pedersen
- 1994: Lars Pedersen
- 1995: Claus Hirsbro
- 1996: Claus Hirsbro
- 1997: Christian Trajkovski
- 1998: Thomas Grønnemark
- 1999: Christian Trajkovski
- 2000: Christian Birk
- 2001: Christian Birk
- 2002: Morten Jensen
- 2003: Mads Bangsø
- 2004: Morten Jensen
- 2005: Mads Bangsø
- 2006: Morten Jensen

== Estonia ==
- 1918*: Johannes Villemson
- 1919*: Johannes Villemson
- 1920: Reinhold Saulmann
- 1921: Konstantin Pereversin
- 1922: Konstantin Pereversin
- 1923: Konstantin Pereversin
- 1924: Konstantin Pereversin
- 1925: Reinhold Kesküll
- 1926: Elmar Rähn
- 1927: Julius Tiisfeldt
- 1928: Edgar Labent
- 1929: Edgar Labent
- 1930: Valter Korol
- 1931: Valter Rattus
- 1932: Nikolai Küttis
- 1933: Rudolf Tomson
- 1934: Rudolf Tomson
- 1935: Ruudi Toomsalu
- 1936: Ruudi Toomsalu
- 1937: Ruudi Toomsalu
- 1938: Valter Kalam
- 1939: Valter Kalam
- 1940: Eduard Nurk
- 1941: -
- 1942: Konstantin Ivanov
- 1943: Konstantin Ivanov
- 1944: Heino Koik
- 1945: Aleksander Sirel
- 1946: Georg Gilde
- 1947: Georg Gilde
- 1948: Georg Gilde
- 1949: Endel Küllik
- 1950: Georg Gilde
- 1951: Georg Gilde
- 1952: Georg Gilde
- 1953: Ülo Laaspere
- 1954: Heino Heinlo
- 1955: Ursel Teedemaa
- 1956: Ülo Laaspere
- 1957: Heino Heinlo
- 1958: Toomas Kitsing
- 1959: Uno Kiiroja
- 1960: Eino Ojastu
- 1961: Kalju Jurkatamm
- 1962: Enno Akkel
- 1963: Toomas Kitsing
- 1964: Kalju Jurkatamm
- 1965: Kalju Kikamägi
- 1966: Kalju Jurkatamm
- 1967: Boris Nugis
- 1968: Kalju Kikamägi
- 1969: Viktor Kirilenko
- 1970: Avo Oja
- 1971: Ennu Laasner
- 1972: Rein Tõru
- 1973: Andres Luka
- 1974: Vladimir Ivaštšenko
- 1975: Gennadi Organov
- 1976: Ramon Lindal
- 1977: Jevgeni Jessin
- 1978: Gennadi Organov
- 1979: Gennadi Organov
- 1980: Ramon Lindal
- 1981: Mihhail Urjadnikov
- 1982: Ramon Lindal
- 1983: Mihhail Urjadnikov
- 1984: Mihhail Urjadnikov
- 1985: Andrus Möll
- 1986: Andrus Möll
- 1987: Andrus Möll
- 1988: Enn Lilienthal
- 1989: Enn Lilienthal
- 1990: Enn Lilienthal
- 1991: Andrei Morozov
- 1992: Rainis Jaansoo
- 1993: Andrei Morozov
- 1994: Andrus Hämelane
- 1995: Andrus Hämelane
- 1996: Rainis Jaansoo
- 1997: Rainis Jaansoo
- 1998: Urmet Uusorg
- 1999: Mait Lind
- 2000: Maidu Laht
- 2001: Martin Vihmann
- 2002: Martin Vihmann
- 2003: Henri Sool
- 2004: Martin Vihmann
- 2005: Martin Vihmann
- 2006: Marek Niit
- 2007: Taavi Liiv
- 2008: Henri Sool
- 2009: Marek Niit
- 2010: Richard Pulst
- 2011: Marek Niit
- 2012: Marek Niit
- 2013: Marek Niit
- 2014: Marek Niit
- 2015: Markus Ellisaar
- 2016: Timo Tiismaa
- 2017: Marek Niit
- 2018: Tony Nõu
- 2019: Ken-Mark Minkovski
- 2020: Henri Sai
- 2021: Henri Sai
- 2022: Karl Erik Nazarov

* unofficial championships

== Finland ==
- 1970: Ossi Karttunen
- 1971: Markku Kukkoaho
- 1972: Antti Rajamäki
- 1973: Ossi Karttunen
- 1974: Ossi Karttunen
- 1975: Antti Rajamäki
- 1976: Markku Kukkoaho
- 1977: Ossi Karttunen
- 1978: Antti Rajamäki
- 1979: Julla Sulalampi
- 1980: Hannu Mykrä
- 1981: Kimmo Saaristo
- 1982: Kimmo Saaristo
- 1983: Kimmo Saaristo
- 1984: Kimmo Saaristo
- 1985: Kimmo Saaristo
- 1986: Kimmo Saaristo
- 1987: Juha Pyy
- 1988: Sakari Syväoja
- 1989: Kay Kyllönen
- 1990: Matti Heusala
- 1991: Jouni Myllymäki
- 1992: Kari Niemi
- 1993: Ari Pakarinen
- 1994: Kay Kyllönen
- 1995: Ari Pakarinen
- 1996: Ari Pakarinen
- 1997: Janne Hautaniemi
- 1998: Harri Kivelä
- 1999: Aleksi Sillanpää
- 2000: Tommi Hartonen
- 2001: Tommi Hartonen
- 2002: Tommi Hartonen
- 2003: Samsa Tuikka
- 2004: Tommi Hartonen
- 2005: Visa Hongisto
- 2006: Nghi Tran
- 2007: Visa Hongisto
- 2008: Visa Hongisto
- 2009: Visa Hongisto
- 2010: Jonathan Åstrand
- 2011: Santeri Tukia

== France ==
- 1970: Gérard Fenouil
- 1971: Gérard Fenouil
- 1972: René Metz
- 1973: Lucien Sainte-Rose
- 1974: Joseph Arame
- 1975: Joseph Arame
- 1976: Joseph Arame
- 1977: Joseph Arame
- 1978: Pascal Barré
- 1979: Pascal Barré
- 1980: Joseph Arame
- 1981: Patrick Barré
- 1982: Herman Lomba
- 1983: Jean-Jacques Boussemart
- 1984: Jean-Jacques Boussemart
- 1985: Antoine Richard
- 1986: Bruno Marie-Rose
- 1987: Bruno Marie-Rose
- 1988: Jean-Charles Trouabal
- 1989: Gilles Quénéhervé
- 1990: Jean-Charles Trouabal
- 1991: Jean-Charles Trouabal
- 1992: Jean-Charles Trouabal
- 1993: Jean-Charles Trouabal
- 1994: Jean-Charles Trouabal
- 1995: Jean-Charles Trouabal
- 1996: Christophe Cheval
- 1997: Christophe Cheval
- 1998: Christophe Cheval
- 1999: Thierry Lubin
- 2000: Joseph Batangdon (CMR)
- 2001: Joseph Batangdon (CMR)
- 2002: Joseph Batangdon (CMR)
- 2003: Joseph Batangdon (CMR)
- 2004: Leslie Djhone
- 2005: Ronald Pognon
- 2006: David Alerte
- 2007: David Alerte
- 2008: Ronald Pognon
- 2009: Martial Mbandjock
- 2010: Christophe Lemaitre
- 2011: Christophe Lemaitre
- 2012: Christophe Lemaitre
- 2013: Christophe Lemaitre
- 2014: Christophe Lemaitre
- 2015: Christophe Lemaitre

== Germany ==
=== East Germany ===
- 1970: Siegfried Schenke
- 1971: Jörg Pfeifer
- 1972: Siegfried Schenke
- 1973: Hans-Jürgen Bombach
- 1974: Hans-Jürgen Bombach
- 1975: Hans-Joachim Zenk
- 1976: Klaus-Dieter Kurrat
- 1977: Bernhard Hoff
- 1978: Olaf Prenzler
- 1979: Bernhard Hoff
- 1980: Bernhard Hoff
- 1981: Frank Emmelmann
- 1982: Detlef Kübeck
- 1983: Olaf Prenzler
- 1984: Frank Emmelmann
- 1985: Frank Emmelmann
- 1986: Thomas Schröder
- 1987: Frank Emmelmann
- 1988: Frank Emmelmann
- 1989: Steffen Schwabe
- 1990: Torsten Heimrath

=== West Germany ===
- 1970: Jochen Eigenherr
- 1971: Karl-Heinz Klotz
- 1972: Manfred Ommer
- 1973: Franz-Peter Hofmeister
- 1974: Manfred Ommer
- 1975: Klaus Ehl
- 1976: Karlheinz Weisenseel
- 1977: Bernd Sattler
- 1978: Franz-Peter Hofmeister
- 1979: Franz-Peter Hofmeister
- 1980: Christian Haas
- 1981: Erwin Skamrahl
- 1982: Erwin Skamrahl
- 1983: Erwin Skamrahl
- 1984: Ralf Lübke
- 1985: Ralf Lübke
- 1986: Ralf Lübke
- 1987: Christian Haas
- 1988: Ralf Lübke
- 1989: Erwin Skamrahl
- 1990: Peter Klein

=== Unified Germany ===
- 1991: Michael Huke
- 1992: Robert Kurnicki
- 1993: Robert Kurnicki
- 1994: Michael Huke
- 1995: Marc Blume
- 1996: Marc Blume
- 1997: Marc Blume
- 1998: Daniel Bittner
- 1999: Stefan Holz
- 2000: Holger Blume
- 2001: Alexander Kosenkow
- 2002: Marc Blume
- 2003: Tobias Unger
- 2004: Tobias Unger
- 2005: Tobias Unger
- 2006: Sebastian Ernst
- 2007: Daniel Schnelting
- 2008: Daniel Schnelting
- 2009: Robert Hering
- 2010: Daniel Schnelting
- 2011: Robin Erewa
- 2012: Julian Reus
- 2013: Julian Reus
- 2014: Robin Erewa
- 2015: Julian Reus

== Great Britain ==
- 1970: Martin Reynolds
- 1971: Alan Pascoe
- 1972: Alan Pascoe
- 1973: Chris Monk
- 1974: Chris Monk
- 1975: Ainsley Bennett
- 1976: Glen Cohen
- 1977: Glen Cohen
- 1978: Allan Wells
- 1979: Earl Tulloch
- 1980: Trevor Hoyte
- 1981: Mike McFarlane
- 1982: Buster Watson
- 1983: Donovan Reid
- 1984: Todd Bennett
- 1985: Ade Mafe
- 1986: John Regis
- 1987: John Regis
- 1988: Linford Christie
- 1989: Marcus Adam
- 1990: John Regis
- 1991: Michael Rosswess
- 1992: John Regis
- 1993: Toby Box
- 1994: Solomon Wariso
- 1995: John Regis
- 1996: John Regis
- 1997: Marlon Devonish
- 1998: Douglas Walker
- 1999: Julian Golding
- 2000: Darren Campbell
- 2001: Marlon Devonish
- 2002: Marlon Devonish
- 2003: Julian Golding
- 2004: Chris Lambert
- 2005: Christian Malcolm
- 2006: Marlon Devonish
- 2007: Marlon Devonish
- 2008: Christian Malcolm
- 2009: Toby Sandeman
- 2010: Christian Malcolm
- 2011: Christian Malcolm
- 2012: James Ellington
- 2013: James Ellington
- 2014: Daniel Talbot
- 2015: Zharnel Hughes
- 2016: Adam Gemili
- 2017: Nethaneel Mitchell-Blake
- 2018: Nethaneel Mitchell-Blake
- 2019: Adam Gemili
- 2020: Andrew Morgan-Harrison
- 2021: Adam Gemili
- 2022: Nethaneel Mitchell-Blake
- 2023: Zharnel Hughes
- 2024: Matthew Hudson-Smith
- 2025: Zharnel Hughes

== India ==
- 1988: Anand Shetty
- 1989: Arjun Devaiah
- 1990: Arjun Devaiah
- 1991: Selvaraj Roberts
- 1992: Anand Natarajan
- 1993: Anand Natarajan
- 1994: Salaam Gariba (GHA)
- 1995: ???
- 1996: Amit Khanna
- 1997: ???
- 1998: Ajay Raj Singh
- 1999: Anil Kumar
- 2000: Clifford Joshua
- 2001: Anil Kumar
- 2002: Anand Menezes
- 2003: Piyush Kumar
- 2004: Anil Kumar
- 2005: Alaguvel Arvind

== Italy ==
- 1970: Giacomo Puosi
- 1971: Pietro Mennea
- 1972: Pietro Mennea
- 1973: Pietro Mennea
- 1974: Pietro Mennea
- 1975: Pasqualino Abeti
- 1976: Pietro Mennea
- 1977: Pietro Mennea
- 1978: Pietro Mennea
- 1979: Pietro Mennea
- 1980: Pietro Mennea
- 1981: Giovanni Bongiorni
- 1982: Carlo Simionato
- 1983: Pietro Mennea
- 1984: Pietro Mennea
- 1985: Carlo Simionato
- 1986: Stefano Tilli
- 1987: Pierfrancesco Pavoni
- 1988: Stefano Tilli
- 1989: Sandro Floris
- 1990: Giovanni Puggioni
- 1991: Stefano Tilli
- 1992: Giorgio Marras
- 1993: Giorgio Marras
- 1994: Giorgio Marras
- 1995: Angelo Cipolloni
- 1996: Angelo Cipolloni
- 1997: Giovanni Puggioni
- 1998: Carlo Occhiena
- 1999: Maurizio Checcucci
- 2000: Alessandro Cavallaro
- 2001: Marco Torrieri
- 2002: Emanuele Di Gregorio
- 2003: Alessandro Cavallaro
- 2004: Alessandro Attene
- 2005: Koura Kaba Fantoni
- 2006: Stefano Anceschi
- 2007: Andrew Howe
- 2008: Matteo Galvan
- 2009: Roberto Donati
- 2010: Roberto Donati
- 2011: Andrew Howe
- 2012: Andrew Howe
- 2013: Diego Marani
- 2014: Diego Marani
- 2015: Davide Manenti

== Jamaica ==
- 1983: Leroy Reid
- 1984: Gus Young
- 1985: ???
- 1986: Leroy Reid
- 1987: Clive Wright
- 1988: Clive Wright
- 1989: Clive Wright
- 1990: ???
- 1991: Windell Dobson
- 1992: Clive Wright
- 1993: Raymond Stewart
- 1994: Garth Robinson
- 1995: Percival Spencer
- 1996: Percival Spencer
- 1997: Percival Spencer
- 1998: Garth Robinson
- 1999: Christopher Williams
- 2000: Christopher Williams
- 2001: Christopher Williams
- 2002: Dwight Thomas
- 2003: Usain Bolt
- 2004: Steve Mullings
- 2005: Usain Bolt
- 2006: Asafa Powell
- 2007: Usain Bolt
- 2008: Usain Bolt
- 2009: Usain Bolt
- 2010: Asafa Powell
- 2011: Nickel Ashmeade
- 2012: Yohan Blake
- 2013: Warren Weir
- 2014: Rasheed Dwyer
- 2015: Nickel Ashmeade
- 2016: Yohan Blake
- 2017: Yohan Blake
- 2018: Jahnoy Thompson
- 2019: Rasheed Dwyer
- 2021: Rasheed Dwyer
- 2022: Andrew Hudson

== Japan ==
The information taken from JAAF website.

- 1970: Hiromitsu Murata
- 1971: Takao Ishizawa
- 1972: Yoshiharu Tomonaga
- 1973: Yoshiharu Tomonaga
- 1974: Yoshiharu Tomonaga
- 1975: Yoshiharu Tomonaga
- 1976: Yasuhiro Harada
- 1977: Toshio Toyota
- 1978: Yoshiaki Hirose
- 1979: Toshio Toyota
- 1980: Toshio Toyota
- 1981: Kenji Yamauchi
- 1982: Toshio Toyota
- 1983: Susumu Takano
- 1984: Hiromi Kawasumi
- 1985: Koichi Mishiba
- 1986: Hirofumi Koike
- 1987: Kenji Yamauchi
- 1988: Kenji Yamauchi
- 1989: Yoshiyuki Okuyama
- 1990: Robson da Silva (BRA)
- 1991: Yoshiyuki Okuyama
- 1992: Hiroki Fuwa
- 1993: Michihiko Komura
- 1994: Kazuhiro Takahashi
- 1995: Koji Ito
- 1996: Koji Ito
- 1997: Masato Ebisawa
- 1998: Hiroyasu Tsuchie
- 1999: Hideki Ishizuka
- 2000: Hideki Ishizuka
- 2001: Shingo Suetsugu
- 2002: Hisashi Miyazaki
- 2003: Shingo Suetsugu
- 2004: Shinji Takahira
- 2005: Shinji Takahira
- 2006: Shingo Suetsugu
- 2007: Shingo Suetsugu
- 2008: Shinji Takahira
- 2009: Shinji Takahira
- 2010: Kenji Fujimitsu
- 2011: Shinji Takahira
- 2012: Kei Takase
- 2013: Shota Iizuka
- 2014: Shota Hara
- 2015: Kenji Fujimitsu
- 2016: Shota Iizuka
- 2017: Abdul Hakim Sani Brown
- 2018: Shota Iizuka
- 2019: Abdul Hakim Sani Brown

== Latvia ==
- 1991: Aleksejs Iljušinš
- 1992: Vjaceslavs Kocerjagins
- 1993: Sergejs Inšakovs
- 1994: Sergejs Inšakovs
- 1995: Sergejs Inšakovs
- 1996: Sergejs Inšakovs
- 1997: Sergejs Inšakovs
- 1998: Ingūns Svikliņš
- 1999: Jevgênijs Dominjuks
- 2000: Sergejs Inšakovs
- 2001: Ingūns Svikliņš
- 2002: Sergejs Inšakovs
- 2003: Vadims Avdejevs
- 2004: Girts Lamba
- 2005: Sandis Sabâjevs
- 2006: Ronalds Arājs
- 2007: ???
- 2008: Sandis Sabâjevs
- 2009: Sandis Džiguns
- 2010: Jānis Mezītis

== Lithuania ==
- 1990: Eimantas Skrabulis
- 1991: Kastytis Klimas
- 1992: Kastytis Klimas
- 1993: Vaidas Rabikas
- 1994: Andrius Vinslovas
- 1995: Saulius Urbutis
- 1996: Saulius Slavinskas
- 1997: Saulius Slavinskas
- 1998: Donatas Jakševicius
- 1999: Jonas Motiejûnas
- 2000: Jonas Motiejûnas
- 2001: Vytaulas Kancleris
- 2002: Stanislav Michno
- 2003: Raimondas Turla
- 2004: Raimondas Turla
- 2005: Raimondas Turla
- 2006: Rytis Sakalauskas
- 2007: Martynas Jurgilas
- 2008: Žilvinas Adomavičius
- 2009: Žilvinas Adomavičius
- 2010: Aivaras Pranckevičius

== Netherlands ==
- 1970: Ad van Boekel
- 1971: Ad van Boekel
- 1972: Eddy Monsels (SUR)
- 1973: Bert de Jager
- 1974: Raymond Heerenveen (AHO)
- 1975: Sammy Monsels (SUR)
- 1976: Henk Brouwer
- 1977: Aart Veldhoen
- 1978: Raymond Heerenveen (AHO)
- 1979: Marcel Klarenbeek
- 1980: Henk Brouwer
- 1981: Henk Brouwer
- 1982: Mario Westbroek
- 1983: Diederik Everts
- 1984: Ahmed de Kom
- 1985: Ahmed de Kom
- 1986: Ahmed de Kom
- 1987: Ahmed de Kom
- 1988: Ahmed de Kom
- 1989: Rob van de Klundert
- 1990: Jerry Achthoven
- 1991: Paul Franklin
- 1992: Clement Moe
- 1993: Regillio van der Vloot
- 1994: Miguel Janssen (ARU)
- 1995: Regillio van der Vloot
- 1996: Patrick van Balkom
- 1997: Frank Perri
- 1998: Patrick van Balkom
- 1999: Patrick van Balkom
- 2000: Patrick van Balkom
- 2001: Caimin Douglas (AHO)
- 2002: Caimin Douglas (AHO)
- 2003: Patrick van Balkom
- 2004: Guus Hoogmoed
- 2005: Guus Hoogmoed
- 2006: Guus Hoogmoed
- 2007: Guus Hoogmoed
- 2008: Patrick van Luijk
- 2009: Patrick van Luijk
- 2010: Obed Martis
- 2011: Churandy Martina
- 2012: Jerrel Ferrer
- 2013: Dennis Spillekom
- 2014: Churandy Martina
- 2015: Liemarvin Bonevacia
- 2016: Churandy Martina
- 2017: Jorén Tromp

== New Zealand ==
- 1970: Laurie D'Arcy
- 1971: Bevan Smith
- 1972: Bevan Smith
- 1973: Bevan Smith
- 1974: Bevan Smith
- 1975: Bevan Smith
- 1976: Terry Morrison
- 1977: Steve Erkkila
- 1978: Graeme French
- 1979: Shane Downey
- 1980: Shane Downey
- 1981: Shane Downey
- 1982: Gary Henley-Smith
- 1983: Gary Henley-Smith
- 1984: Shane Downey
- 1985: Dale McClunie
- 1986: Dale McClunie
- 1987: Dale McClunie
- 1988: Dale McClunie
- 1989: Dale McClunie
- 1990: Scott Bowden
- 1991: Augustine Nketia (GHA)
- 1992: Augustine Nketia
- 1993: Mark Keddell
- 1994: Todd Blythe
- 1995: Mark Keddell
- 1996: Matthew Coad
- 1997: Chris Donaldson
- 1998: Matthew Coad
- 1999: Chris Donaldson
- 2000: Chris Donaldson
- 2001: Matthew Coad
- 2002: Michael O'Connor
- 2003: Dallas Roberts
- 2004: Dallas Roberts
- 2005: James Dolphin
- 2006: James Dolphin
- 2007: James Dolphin
- 2008: James Dolphin
- 2009: J. Thumath
- 2010: James Dolphin
- 2011: Alex Jordan
- 2012: Joseph Millar
- 2013: Joseph Millar

== Nigeria ==
- 2001: Uchenna Emedolu
- 2002: Uchenna Emedolu
- 2003: Uchenna Emedolu
- 2006: Uchenna Emedolu
- 2007: Obinna Metu
- 2008: Obinna Metu
- 2010: Obinna Metu
- 2012: Obinna Metu
- 2013: Ukale Elvis
- 2014: Ejowvokoghene Oduduru
- 2015: Tega Odele

== Norway ==
- 1970: Richard Simonsen
- 1971: Richard Simonsen
- 1972: Audun Garshol
- 1973: Audun Garshol
- 1974: Øyvind Røst
- 1975: Johnny Haugen
- 1976: Audun Garshol
- 1977: Johnny Haugen
- 1978: Knut M. Stokke
- 1979: Knut M. Stokke
- 1980: Jens Arild Johannessen
- 1981: Odd Erik Kristiansen
- 1982: Tore Bergan
- 1983: Svein Erik Storlien
- 1984: Einar Sagli
- 1985: Einar Sagli
- 1986: Einar Sagli
- 1987: Jarle Løken
- 1988: Geir Moen
- 1989: Aham Okeke
- 1990: Aham Okeke
- 1991: Geir Moen
- 1992: Aham Okeke
- 1993: Geir Moen
- 1994: Kennet Kjensli
- 1995: Geir Moen
- 1996: Geir Moen
- 1997: Geir Moen
- 1998: Geir Moen
- 1999: Geir Moen
- 2000: John Ertzgaard
- 2001: John Ertzgaard
- 2002: Geir Moen
- 2003: John Ertzgaard
- 2004: Aham Okeke
- 2005: John Ertzgaard
- 2006: Steffen Kjønnås

== Poland ==
- 1970: Zenon Nowosz
- 1971: Jan Werner
- 1972: Jerzy Czerbniak
- 1973: Marek Bedyński
- 1974: Marek Bedyński
- 1975: Bogdan Grzejszczak
- 1976: Zenon Licznerski
- 1977: Zenon Licznerski
- 1978: Leszek Dunecki
- 1979: Leszek Dunecki
- 1980: Leszek Dunecki
- 1981: Leszek Dunecki
- 1982: Czesław Prądzyński
- 1983: Marian Woronin
- 1984: Leszek Dunecki
- 1985: Czesław Prądzyński
- 1986: Czesław Prądzyński
- 1987: Czesław Prądzyński
- 1988: Czesław Prądzyński
- 1989: Marek Zalewski
- 1990: Marek Zalewski
- 1991: Jarosław Kaniecki
- 1992: Marek Zalewski
- 1993: Marek Zalewski
- 1994: Marek Zalewski
- 1995: Robert Maćkowiak
- 1996: Robert Maćkowiak
- 1997: Robert Maćkowiak
- 1998: Marcin Urbaś
- 1999: Marcin Urbaś
- 2000: Marcin Urbaś
- 2001: Marcin Urbaś
- 2002: Marcin Jędrusiński
- 2003: Marcin Jędrusiński
- 2004: Marcin Urbaś
- 2005: Marcin Jędrusiński
- 2006: Marcin Jędrusiński
- 2007: Marcin Jędrusiński
- 2008: Marcin Jędrusiński
- 2009: Dariusz Kuć
- 2010: Kamil Kryński
- 2011: Kamil Kryński
- 2012: Kamil Kryński
- 2013: Karol Zalewski
- 2014: Karol Zalewski
- 2015: Karol Zalewski
- 2016: Karol Zalewski
- 2017: Karol Zalewski
- 2018: Dominik Kopeć
- 2019: Dominik Kopeć

== Portugal ==
- 1970: Alberto Matos
- 1971: Mena Antunes
- 1972: José Carvalho
- 1973: Fernando Silva
- 1974: António Cachola
- 1975: António Cachola
- 1976: António Cachola
- 1977: António Cachola
- 1978: António Cachola
- 1979: António Cachola
- 1980: Daniel Monteiro
- 1981: António Cachola
- 1982: Arnaldo Abrantes Sr.
- 1983: Luís Barroso
- 1984: Luís Barroso
- 1985: Luís Barroso
- 1986: Arnaldo Abrantes Sr.
- 1987: Luís Barroso
- 1988: Luís Barroso
- 1989: Luís Barroso
- 1990: Pedro Agostinho
- 1991: Pedro Agostinho
- 1992: Luís Cunha
- 1993: Luís Cunha
- 1994: Vítor Jorge
- 1995: Luís Cunha
- 1996: Carlos Calado
- 1997: Carlos Calado
- 1998: Vítor Jorge
- 1999: Vítor Jorge
- 2000: Ricardo Alves
- 2001: Ricardo Alves
- 2002: Francis Obikwelu
- 2003: Francis Obikwelu
- 2004: Arnaldo Abrantes
- 2005: Paulo Ferreira
- 2006: João Ferreira
- 2007: Francis Obikwelu
- 2008: João Ferreira
- 2009: João Ferreira
- 2010: André Biveti
- 2011: Yazaldes Nascimento
- 2012: David Lima
- 2013: Yazaldes Nascimento
- 2014: Yazaldes Nascimento
- 2015: Vítor Ricardo dos Santos
- 2016: David Lima
- 2017: David Lima
- 2018: Diogo Antunes
- 2019: Miguel Alves
- 2020: Frederico Curvelo

== Russia ==
- 1992: Aleksandr Goremykin
- 1993: Oleg Fatun
- 1994: Andrey Fedoriv
- 1995: Aleksandr Sokolov
- 1996: Andrey Fedoriv
- 1997: Andrey Fedoriv
- 1998: Vitaliy Ignatov
- 1999: Sergey Slukin
- 2000: Anton Galkin
- 2001: Oleg Sergeyev
- 2002: Oleg Sergeyev
- 2003: Yevgeniy Vorobyev
- 2004: Oleg Sergeyev
- 2005: Oleg Sergeyev
- 2006: Ivan Teplykh

== South Africa ==
- 2009: Thuso Mpuang
- 2010: Simon Magakwe
- 2013: Simon Magakwe
- 2014: Ncincihli Titi
- 2015: Anaso Jobodwana
- 2016: Clarence Munyai

== Spain ==
Spanish 200-metre national champions are given below.

- 1970: José Luis Sarriá
- 1971: José Luis Sarriá
- 1972: José Luis Sarriá
- 1973: José Luis Sarriá
- 1974: José Luis Sarriá
- 1975: Miguel Arnau
- 1976: José Luis Sarriá
- 1977: José Luis Sarriá
- 1978: José Luis Sarriá
- 1979: Ángel Heras
- 1980: Juan José Prado
- 1981: Javier Martínez
- 1982: Ángel Heras
- 1983: Antonio Sánchez
- 1984: Antonio Sánchez
- 1985: Juan José Prado
- 1986: Antonio Sánchez
- 1987: Antonio Sánchez
- 1988: Cayetano Cornet
- 1989: Miguel Ángel Gómez
- 1990: Luis Rodríguez
- 1991: Enrique Talavera
- 1992: Miguel Ángel Gómez
- 1993: Jordi Mayoral
- 1994: Frutos Feo
- 1995: Jordi Mayoral
- 1996: Jordi Mayoral
- 1997: Jordi Mayoral
- 1998: Francisco Javier Navarro
- 1999: Jordi Mayoral
- 2000: Jordi Mayoral
- 2001: Adrián Fernández
- 2002: Julián Martínez
- 2003: Jordi Mayoral
- 2004: Ángel David Rodríguez
- 2005: David Canal
- 2006: Josué Mena
- 2007: Javier Sanz
- 2008: Alberto Dorrego
- 2009: Ángel David Rodríguez
- 2010: Ángel David Rodríguez
- 2011: Ángel David Rodríguez
- 2012: Ángel David Rodríguez
- 2013: Bruno Hortelano
- 2014: Iván Jesús Ramos
- 2015: Bruno Hortelano
- 2016: Óscar Husillos
- 2017: Samuel García

== Sweden ==
- 1970: Anders Faager
- 1971: Bo Söderberg
- 1972: Anders Faager
- 1973: Thorsten Johansson
- 1974: Thorsten Johansson
- 1975: Thorsten Johansson
- 1976: Thorsten Johansson
- 1977: Thorsten Johansson
- 1978: Thorsten Johansson
- 1979: Lars-Arne Ericsson
- 1980: Dan Orbe
- 1981: Eric Josjö
- 1982: Eric Josjö
- 1983: Dan Orbe
- 1984: Tommy Johansson
- 1985: Eric Josjö
- 1986: Tommy Björnqvist
- 1987: Robert Nilsson
- 1988: Eric Josjö
- 1989: Marty Krulee (USA)
- 1990: Torbjörn Eriksson
- 1991: Marty Krulee (USA)
- 1992: Torbjörn Eriksson
- 1993: Torbjörn Eriksson
- 1994: Lars Hedner
- 1995: Lars Hedner
- 1996: Lars Hedner
- 1997: Torbjörn Eriksson
- 1998: Torbjörn Eriksson
- 1999: Mikael Ahl
- 2000: Johan Engberg
- 2001: Johan Wissman
- 2002: Erik Wahn
- 2003: Johan Wissman
- 2004: Johan Wissman
- 2005: Christofer Sandin
- 2006: Johan Wissman

== Trinidad and Tobago ==
- 1970: Keith Holder
- 1971: -
- 1972: Ainsley Armstrong
- 1973: Rudolph Reid
- 1974: Charles Joseph
- 1975: Charles Joseph
- 1976: Hasely Crawford
- 1977: Edwin Noel
- 1978: Christopher Brathwaite
- 1979: Michael Paul
- 1980: Christopher Brathwaite
- 1981: Anthony Munroe
- 1982: ???
- 1983: Christopher Brathwaite
- 1984: ???
- 1985: Michael Paul
- 1986: Ian Morris
- 1987: Alvin Daniel
- 1988: Roland Barclay
- 1989: ???
- 1990: -
- 1991: Roland Barclay
- 1992: Ato Boldon
- 1993: Boyd Kennedy
- 1994: Neil de Silva
- 1995: Alvin Daniel
- 1996: Neil de Silva
- 1997: Alvin Daniel
- 1998: Peter Frederick
- 1999: Jacey Harper
- 2000: Julien Raeburn
- 2001: Dion Rodriguez
- 2002: Marvin Regis
- 2003: Jacey Harper
- 2004: Marcus Duncan
- 2005: Aaron Armstrong
- 2006: Aaron Armstrong
- 2007: Emmanuel Callender
- 2008: Rondel Sorrillo
- 2009: Rondel Sorrillo
- 2010: Richard Thompson
- 2011: Rondel Sorrillo
- 2012: Rondel Sorrillo
- 2013: Lalonde Gordon
- 2014: Lalonde Gordon
- 2015: Kyle Greaux

== Ukraine ==
- 1992: Ihor Streltsov
- 1993: Oleksiy Chykhachov
- 1994: Oleksiy Chykhachov
- 1995: Vladyslav Dolohodin
- 1996: Roman Galkin
- 1997: Vladyslav Dolohodin
- 1998: Serhiy Polinkov
- 1999: Serhiy Osovych
- 2000: Serhiy Polinkov
- 2001: Anatoliy Dovhal
- 2002: Kostyantyn Rurak
- 2003: Yevhen Zyukov
- 2004: Dmytro Hlushchenko
- 2005: Dmytro Hlushchenko
- 2006: Dmytro Hlushchenko
- 2007: Dmytro Hlushchenko
- 2008: Ihor Bodrov
- 2009: Ihor Bodrov
- 2010: Oleksiy Ryemyen
- 2011: Ihor Bodrov
- 2012: Serhiy Smelyk
- 2013: Serhiy Smelyk
- 2014: Serhiy Smelyk
- 2015: Vitaliy Korzh
- 2016: Serhiy Smelyk
- 2017: Emil Ibrahimov
- 2018: Serhiy Smelyk
- 2019: Serhiy Smelyk
- 2020: Serhiy Smelyk

== United States ==
- 1970: Ben Vaughan
- 1971: Don Quarrie (JAM)
- 1972: Charles Smith
- 1973: Steve Williams
- 1974: Don Quarrie (JAM)
- 1975: Don Quarrie (JAM)
- 1976: Millard Hampton
- 1977: Derald Harris
- 1978: Clancy Edwards
- 1979: Dwayne Evans
- 1980: LaMonte King
- 1981: Jeff Phillips
- 1982: Calvin Smith
- 1983: Carl Lewis
- 1984: Brady Crain
- 1985: Kirk Baptiste
- 1986: Floyd Heard
- 1987: Carl Lewis
- 1988: Larry Myricks
- 1989: Floyd Heard
- 1990: Michael Johnson
- 1991: Michael Johnson
- 1992: Michael Johnson
- 1993: Michael Marsh
- 1994: Ron Clark
- 1995: Michael Johnson
- 1996: Michael Johnson
- 1997: Jon Drummond
- 1998: Gentry Bradley
- 1999: Maurice Greene
- 2000: John Capel
- 2001: Shawn Crawford
- 2002: Darvis Patton
- 2003: Darvis Patton
- 2004: Shawn Crawford
- 2005: Justin Gatlin
- 2006: Wallace Spearmon
- 2007: Tyson Gay
- 2008: Walter Dix
- 2009: Shawn Crawford
- 2010: Wallace Spearmon
- 2011: Walter Dix
- 2012: Wallace Spearmon
- 2013: Tyson Gay
- 2014: Curtis Mitchell
- 2015: Justin Gatlin
- 2016: Justin Gatlin
- 2017: Ameer Webb
- 2018: Ameer Webb
- 2019: Noah Lyles
