= List of 100 metres national champions (men) =

Below a list of all national champions in the men's 100 metres in track and field from several countries since 1970.

== Argentina ==
- 1970: Pedro Bassart
- 1971: Pedro Bassart
- 1972: Pedro Bassart
- 1973: Gustavo Dubarbier
- 1974: Pedro Bassart
- 1975: Gustavo Dubarbier
- 1976: Carlos Martínez
- 1977: Gustavo Dubarbier
- 1978: Gustavo Dubarbier
- 1979: Gustavo Dubarbier
- 1980: Gustavo Dubarbier
- 1981: Nicolás Duncan Glass
- 1982: Hugo Alzamora
- 1983: Oscar Barrionuevo
- 1984: Oscar Barrionuevo
- 1985: Oscar Barrionuevo
- 1986: Gerardo Meinardi
- 1987: Gabriel Somma
- 1988: Claudio Arcas
- 1989: Alejandro Terzián
- 1990: Alejandro Terzián
- 1991: Claudio Molocznik
- 1992: Guillermo Cacián
- 1993: Carlos Gats
- 1994: Carlos Gats
- 1995: Gabriel Simón
- 1996: Carlos Gats
- 1997: Carlos Gats
- 1998:Gabriel Simón
- 1999: Gabriel Simón
- 2000: Gabriel Simón
- 2001: Gabriel Simón
- 2002: Gabriel Simón
- 2003: Matías Usandivaras
- 2004: Matías Usandivaras
- 2005: Iván Altamirano
- 2006: Iván Altamirano
- 2009: Miguel Wilken
- 2010: Kael Becerra
- 2011: Mariano Jiménez
- 2012: Not known
- 2014: Matías Robledo
- 2015: Matías Robledo
- 2016: Matías Robledo
- 2018: Matías Robledo
- 2020: Franco Florio
- 2022: Franco Florio
- 2023: Franco Florio
- 2024: Franco Florio

== Australia ==
- 1970: Eric Bigby
- 1971: Eric Bigby
- 1972: Laurie D'Arcy (NZL)
- 1973: David Stokes
- 1974: Graham Haskell
- 1975: Graham Haskell
- 1976: Greg Lewis
- 1977: Paul Narracott
- 1978: Paul Narracott
- 1979: Paul Narracott
- 1980: Richard James
- 1981: Peter Gandy
- 1982: Paul Narracott
- 1983: Paul Narracott
- 1984: Paul Narracott
- 1985: Fred Martin
- 1986: Gerrard Keating
- 1987: Shane Naylor
- 1988: Shane Naylor
- 1989: David Dworjanyn
- 1990: Tim Jackson
- 1991: Dean Capobianco
- 1992: Shane Naylor
- 1993: Dean Capobianco
- 1994: Damien Marsh
- 1995: Shane Naylor
- 1996: Damien Marsh
- 1997: Steve Brimacombe
- 1998: Matt Shirvington
- 1999: Matt Shirvington
- 2000: Matt Shirvington
- 2001: Matt Shirvington
- 2002: Matt Shirvington
- 2003: Patrick Johnson
- 2004: Joshua Ross
- 2005: Joshua Ross
- 2006: Joshua Ross
- 2007: Joshua Ross
- 2008: Otis Gowa
- 2009: Joshua Ross
- 2010: Aaron Rouge-Serret
- 2011: Aaron Rouge-Serret
- 2012: Joshua Ross
- 2013: Joshua Ross
- 2014: Tim Leathart
- 2015: Joshua Clarke
- 2016: Alexander Hartmann

== The Bahamas ==
- 2004: Dominic Demeritte
- 2005: Derrick Atkins
- 2006: Derrick Atkins
- 2007: Derrick Atkins
- 2008: Derrick Atkins
- 2009: Derrick Atkins
- 2010: Adrian Griffith
- 2011: Adrian Griffith
- 2012: Derrick Atkins
- 2013: Derrick Atkins
- 2014: Shavez Hart
- 2015: Shavez Hart

== Barbados ==
- 2003: Andrew Hinds
- 2006: Andrew Hinds
- 2008: Andrew Hinds
- 2009: Andrew Hinds
- 2011: Andrew Hinds
- 2013: Ramon Gittens
- 2015: Levi Cadogan

== Belarus ==
- 1992: Sergey Kornelyuk
- 1993: Leonid Safronnikov
- 1994: Aleksandr Shlychkov (UKR)
- 1995: Sergey Kornelyuk
- 1996: Sergey Kornelyuk
- 1997: Sergey Kornelyuk
- 1998: Leonid Safronnikov
- 1999: Aleksandr Slyunkov
- 2000: Yuriy Rydeyskiy
- 2001: Aleksandr Slyunkov
- 2002: Vyacheslav Aliyey
- 2003: Yuriy Bagatka
- 2004: Dmitriy Golub
- 2005: Maksim Pisunov
- 2006: Maksim Pisunov
- 2007: ???
- 2008: ???
- 2009: Ivan Dymar
- 2010: Aliaksandr Linnik

== Belgium ==
- 1970: Paul Poels
- 1971: Jean-Pierre Borlée
- 1972: Mario Demarchi
- 1973: Guy Stas
- 1974: Lambert Micha
- 1975: Fons Brydenbach
- 1976: Frank Verhelst
- 1977: Lambert Micha
- 1978: Ronald Desruelles
- 1979: Ronald Desruelles
- 1980: Frank Verhelst
- 1981: Jacques Borlée
- 1982: Ronald Desruelles
- 1983: Jacques Borlée
- 1984: Ronald Desruelles
- 1985: Ronald Desruelles
- 1986: Ronald Desruelles
- 1987: Ronald Desruelles
- 1988: Patrick Stevens
- 1989: Patrick Stevens
- 1990: Patrick Stevens
- 1991: Patrick Stevens
- 1992: Patrick Stevens
- 1993: Patrick Stevens
- 1994: Patrick Stevens
- 1995: Patrick Stevens
- 1996: Erik Wijmeersch
- 1997: Patrick Stevens
- 1998: Erik Wijmeersch
- 1999: Patrick Stevens
- 2000: Patrick Stevens
- 2001: Nathan Bongelo Bongelemba
- 2002: Erik Wijmeersch
- 2003: Xavier De Baerdemaker
- 2004: Patrick Stevens
- 2005: Anthony Ferro
- 2006: Anthony Ferro
- 2007: Kristof Beyens
- 2008: Erik Wijmeersch
- 2009: Jean Marie Louis
- 2010: Wout Verhoeven
- 2011: Wout Verhoeven
- 2012: Julien Watrin
- 2013: Damien Broothaerts
- 2014: Chamberry Muaka
- 2015: Yannick Meyer
- 2016: Andreas Vranken

== Brazil ==
- 1991: Robson da Silva
- 1992: Robson da Silva
- 1993: Robson da Silva
- 1994: Sidney Telles de Souza
- 1995: Robson da Silva
- 1996: Arnaldo da Silva
- 1997: André da Silva
- 1998: Claudinei da Silva
- 1999: Claudinei da Silva
- 2000: Vicente de Lima
- 2001: Claudinei da Silva and Raphael de Oliveira
- 2002: Vicente de Lima
- 2003: Édson Ribeiro
- 2004: Vicente de Lima
- 2005: Vicente de Lima
- 2006: José Carlos Moreira
- 2007: Sandro Viana
- 2008: Vicente de Lima
- 2009: José Carlos Moreira
- 2010: Jefferson Liberato Lucindo
- 2011: Bruno de Barros
- 2012: José Carlos Moreira
- 2013: José Carlos Moreira
- 2014: Bruno de Barros
- 2015: Vitor Hugo dos Santos

== Canada ==
- 1970: Charlie Francis
- 1971: Charlie Francis
- 1972: Herman Carter
- 1973: Charlie Francis
- 1974: Hugh Fraser
- 1975: Hugh Fraser
- 1976: Cole Doty
- 1977: Hugh Fraser
- 1978: Hugh Fraser
- 1979: Desai Williams
- 1980: Desai Williams
- 1981: Desai Williams
- 1982: Tony Sharpe
- 1983: Desai Williams
- 1984: Ben Johnson
- 1985: Ben Johnson
- 1986: Ben Johnson
- 1987: Ben Johnson
- 1988: Ben Johnson
- 1989: Bruny Surin
- 1990: Bruny Surin
- 1991: Bruny Surin
- 1992: Glenroy Gilbert
- 1993: Atlee Mahorn
- 1994: Glenroy Gilbert
- 1995: Donovan Bailey
- 1996: Robert Esmie
- 1997: Donovan Bailey
- 1998: Bruny Surin
- 1999: Bruny Surin
- 2000: Bruny Surin
- 2001: Donovan Bailey
- 2002: Nicolas Macrozonaris
- 2003: Nicolas Macrozonaris
- 2004: Pierre Browne
- 2005: Pierre Browne
- 2006: Nicolas Macrozonaris
- 2007: Nicolas Macrozonaris
- 2008: Pierre Browne
- 2009: Bryan Barnett
- 2010: Sam Effah
- 2011: Sam Effah
- 2012: Justyn Warner
- 2013: Aaron Brown
- 2014: Gavin Smellie
- 2015: Andre De Grasse
- 2016: Andre De Grasse
- 2017: Andre De Grasse
- 2018: Aaron Brown
- 2019: Aaron Brown
- 2020: Not held due to COVID-19
- 2021: Aaron Brown
- 2022: Aaron Brown
- 2023: Aaron Brown
- 2024: Andre De Grasse

== Denmark ==
- 1970: Søren Viggo Pedersen
- 1971: Søren Viggo Pedersen
- 1972: Søren Viggo Pedersen
- 1973: Søren Viggo Pedersen
- 1974: Søren Viggo Pedersen
- 1975: Jens Hansen
- 1976: Ole Lysholt
- 1977: Jens Hansen
- 1978: Ole Lysholt
- 1979: Jens Smedegård (Hansen)
- 1980: Jens Smedegård
- 1981: Jens Smedegård
- 1982: Carl Emil Falbe Hansen
- 1983: Peter Regli
- 1984: Lars Pedersen
- 1985: Lars Pedersen
- 1986: Morten Kjems
- 1987: Peter Regli
- 1988: Lars Pedersen
- 1989: Lars Pedersen
- 1990: Lars Pedersen
- 1991: Lars Pedersen
- 1992: Lars Pedersen
- 1993: Claus Hirsbro
- 1994: Lars Pedersen
- 1995: Christian Trajkovski
- 1996: Claus Hirsbro
- 1997: Benjamin Hecht
- 1998: Benjamin Hecht
- 1999: Christian Trajkovski
- 2000: Christian Trajkovski
- 2001: Morten Jensen
- 2002: Morten Jensen
- 2003: Morten Jensen
- 2004: Morten Jensen
- 2005: Morten Jensen
- 2006: Morten Jensen
- 2007: Morten Jensen
- 2008: Martin Krabbe
- 2009: Jesper Simonsen
- 2010: Jesper Simonsen
- 2011: Andreas Trajkovski
- 2012: Frederik Thomsen
- 2019: Frederik Schou

== Estonia ==
- 1917*: Johannes Villemson
- 1918*: Johannes Villemson
- 1919*: Johannes Villemson
- 1920: Reinhold Saulmann
- 1921: Konstantin Pereversin
- 1922: Konstantin Pereversin
- 1923: Reinhold Kesküll
- 1924: Konstantin Pereversin
- 1925: Reinhold Kesküll
- 1926: Elmar Rähn
- 1927: Edgar Labent
- 1928: Edgar Labent
- 1929: Edgar Labent
- 1930: Valter Korol
- 1931: Valter Rattus
- 1932: Nikolai Küttis
- 1933: Rudolf Tomson
- 1934: Rudolf Tomson
- 1935: Ruudi Toomsalu
- 1936: Ruudi Toomsalu
- 1937: Ruudi Toomsalu
- 1938: Ruudi Toomsalu
- 1939: Georg Vuht
- 1940: Harry Aumere
- 1941: -
- 1942: Konstantin Ivanov
- 1943: Vadim Palm
- 1944: Heino Koik
- 1945: Konstantin Ivanov
- 1946: Heldur Tüüts
- 1947: Georg Gilde
- 1948: Georg Gilde
- 1949: Endel Küllik
- 1950: Georg Gilde
- 1951: Uno Liiv
- 1952: Georg Gilde
- 1953: Uno Liiv
- 1954: Heino Heinlo
- 1955: Uno Kiiroja
- 1956: Uno Kiiroja
- 1957: Heino Heinlo
- 1958: Toomas Kitsing
- 1959: Uno Kiiroja
- 1960: Uno Kiiroja
- 1961: Eino Ojastu
- 1962: Toomas Kitsing
- 1963: Toomas Kitsing
- 1964: Jüri Liigand
- 1965: Jüri Liigand
- 1966: Jüri Liigand
- 1967: Boris Nugis and Eduard Püve
- 1968: Jüri Liigand
- 1969: Viktor Kirilenko
- 1970: Avo Oja
- 1971: Kalju Jurkatamm
- 1972: Jüri Liigand
- 1973: Paul Nagel
- 1974: Andres Luka
- 1975: Gennadi Organov
- 1976: Gennadi Organov
- 1977: Gennadi Organov
- 1978: Gennadi Organov
- 1979: Jevgeni Jessin
- 1980: Jevgeni Jessin
- 1981: Mihhail Urjadnikov
- 1982: Mihhail Urjadnikov
- 1983: Mihhail Urjadnikov
- 1984: Mihhail Urjadnikov
- 1985: Andrus Möll
- 1986: Andrus Möll
- 1987: Andrus Möll
- 1988: Enn Lilienthal
- 1989: Enn Lilienthal
- 1990: Andrei Morozov
- 1991: Andrei Morozov
- 1992: Andrei Morozov
- 1993: Andrei Morozov
- 1994: Andrei Morozov
- 1995: Andrei Morozov
- 1996: Rainis Jaansoo
- 1997: Rainis Jaansoo
- 1998: Tanel Soosaar
- 1999: Erki Nool
- 2000: Maidu Laht
- 2001: Garol Pärn
- 2002: Argo Golberg
- 2003: Argo Golberg
- 2004: Allar Aasma
- 2005: Henri Sool
- 2006: Marek Niit
- 2007: Henri Sool
- 2008: Marek Niit
- 2009: Richard Pulst
- 2010: Richard Pulst
- 2011: Mart Muru
- 2012: Marek Niit
- 2013: Timo Tiismaa
- 2014: Rait Veesalu
- 2015: Kaspar Mesila
- 2016: Timo Tiismaa
- 2017: Marek Niit
- 2018: Richard Pulst
- 2019: Karl Erik Nazarov
- 2020: Henri Sai
- 2021: Karl Erik Nazarov
- 2022: Karl Erik Nazarov

* unofficial championships

== Finland ==
- 1970: Raimo Vilén
- 1971: Raimo Vilén
- 1972: Raimo Vilén
- 1973: Antti Rajamäki
- 1974: Antti Rajamäki
- 1975: Antti Rajamäki
- 1976: Raimo Räty
- 1977: Antti Rajamäki
- 1978: Antti Rajamäki
- 1979: Ossi Karttunen
- 1980: Esko Elsilä
- 1981: Tapani Turunen
- 1982: Jukka Sihvonen
- 1983: Kimmo Saaristo
- 1984: Kimmo Saaristo
- 1985: Kimmo Saaristo
- 1986: Kimmo Saaristo
- 1987: Ari Salonen
- 1988: Jarkko Toivonen
- 1989: Kari Niemi
- 1990: Turo Meriläinen
- 1991: Sami Länsivuori
- 1992: Sami Länsivuori
- 1993: Janne Haapasalo
- 1994: Ari Pakarinen
- 1995: Harri Kivelä
- 1996: Ari Pakarinen
- 1997: Harri Kivelä
- 1998: Janne Haapasalo
- 1999: Kim Lesch
- 2000: Tuomas Näsi
- 2001: Kari Louramo
- 2002: Markus Pöyhönen
- 2003: Markus Pöyhönen
- 2004: Stefan Koivikko
- 2005: Markus Pöyhönen
- 2006: Visa Hongisto
- 2007: Nghi Tran
- 2008: Joni Rautanen
- 2009: Jarkko Ruostekivi
- 2010: Joni Rautanen
- 2011: Hannu Hämäläinen

== France ==
- 1970: Alain Sarteur
- 1971: Jean-Pierre Grès
- 1972: Alain Sarteur
- 1973: Gilles Echevin
- 1974: Steve Williams (USA)
- 1975: Gilles Echevin
- 1976: Dominique Chauvelot
- 1977: Lucien Sainte-Rose
- 1978: Hermann Panzo
- 1979: Philippe Lejoncour
- 1980: Hermann Panzo
- 1981: Antoine Richard
- 1982: Antoine Richard
- 1983: Antoine Richard
- 1984: Bruno Marie-Rose
- 1985: Antoine Richard
- 1986: Antoine Richard
- 1987: Max Morinière
- 1988: Max Morinière
- 1989: Bruno Marie-Rose
- 1990: Daniel Sangouma
- 1991: Daniel Sangouma
- 1992: Jean-Charles Trouabal
- 1993: Jean-Charles Trouabal
- 1994: Jean-Charles Trouabal
- 1995: Olivier Théophile
- 1996: Ibrahim Meité (CIV)
- 1997: Stéphane Cali
- 1998: Stéphane Cali
- 1999: Aimé-Issa Nthépé
- 2000: David Patros
- 2001: Frédéric Krantz
- 2002: Idrissa Sanou (BUR)
- 2003: Aimé-Issa Nthépé
- 2004: Aimé-Issa Nthépé
- 2005: Lueyi Dovy
- 2006: Ronald Pognon
- 2007: Lueyi Dovy
- 2008: Martial Mbandjock
- 2009: Ronald Pognon
- 2010: Christophe Lemaitre
- 2011: Christophe Lemaitre
- 2012: Christophe Lemaitre
- 2013: Jimmy Vicaut
- 2014: Christophe Lemaitre
- 2015: Jimmy Vicaut

== Germany ==
=== East Germany ===
- 1970: Siegfried Schenke
- 1971: Siegfried Schenke
- 1972: Bernd Borth
- 1973: Hans-Jürgen Bombach
- 1974: Manfred Kokot
- 1975: Klaus-Dieter Kurrat
- 1976: Klaus-Dieter Kurrat
- 1977: Eugen Ray
- 1978: Eugen Ray
- 1979: Olaf Prenzler
- 1980: Eugen Ray
- 1981: Frank Emmelmann
- 1982: Frank Emmelmann
- 1983: Thomas Schröder
- 1984: Thomas Schröder
- 1985: Frank Emmelmann
- 1986: Thomas Schröder
- 1987: Steffen Bringmann
- 1988: Sven Matthes
- 1989: Steffen Bringmann
- 1990: Steffen Görmer

=== West Germany ===
- 1970: Günther Nickel
- 1971: Karl-Heinz Klotz
- 1972: Manfred Ommer
- 1973: Jobst Hirscht
- 1974: Manfred Ommer
- 1975: Klaus Ehl
- 1976: Dieter Steinmann
- 1977: Bernd Sattler
- 1978: Werner Zaske
- 1979: Fritz Heer
- 1980: Christian Haas
- 1981: Christian Haas
- 1982: Christian Haas
- 1983: Christian Haas
- 1984: Ralf Lübke
- 1985: Christian Haas
- 1986: Christian Haas
- 1987: Christian Haas
- 1988: Andreas Maul
- 1989: Wolfgang Haupt
- 1990: Peter Klein

=== Unified Germany ===
- 1991: Steffen Bringmann
- 1992: Steffen Bringmann
- 1993: Marc Blume
- 1994: Marc Blume
- 1995: Marc Blume
- 1996: Marc Blume
- 1997: Marc Blume
- 1998: Marc Blume
- 1999: Holger Blume
- 2000: Holger Blume
- 2001: Tim Goebel
- 2002: Marc Blume
- 2003: Alexander Kosenkow
- 2004: Ronny Ostwald
- 2005: Tobias Unger
- 2006: Ronny Ostwald
- 2007: Alexander Kosenkow
- 2008: Tobias Unger
- 2009: Tobias Unger
- 2010: Alexander Kosenkow
- 2011: Tobias Unger
- 2012: Lucas Jakubczyk
- 2013: Julian Reus
- 2014: Julian Reus
- 2015: Julian Reus

== Great Britain ==
- 1970: Brian Green
- 1971: Brian Green
- 1972: Brian Green
- 1973: Don Halliday
- 1974: Don Halliday
- 1975: Ainsley Bennett
- 1976: Allan Wells
- 1977: Tim Bonsor
- 1978: Allan Wells
- 1979: Mike McFarlane
- 1980: Allan Wells
- 1981: Drew McMaster
- 1982: Cameron Sharp
- 1983: Allan Wells
- 1984: Donovan Reid
- 1985: Linford Christie
- 1986: Linford Christie
- 1987: John Regis
- 1988: Linford Christie
- 1989: Linford Christie
- 1990: Linford Christie
- 1991: Linford Christie
- 1992: Linford Christie
- 1993: Linford Christie
- 1994: Linford Christie
- 1995: Darren Braithwaite
- 1996: Linford Christie
- 1997: Jason Gardener
- 1998: Darren Campbell
- 1999: Jason Gardener
- 2000: Dwain Chambers
- 2001: Dwain Chambers
- 2002: Mark Lewis-Francis
- 2003: Darren Campbell
- 2004: Jason Gardener
- 2005: Jason Gardener
- 2006: Marlon Devonish
- 2007: Marlon Devonish
- 2008: Dwain Chambers
- 2009: Simeon Williamson
- 2010: Dwain Chambers
- 2011: Dwain Chambers
- 2012: Dwain Chambers
- 2013: Dwain Chambers
- 2014: Dwain Chambers
- 2015: Chijindu Ujah
- 2016: James Dasaolu
- 2017: Reece Prescod
- 2018: Reece Prescod
- 2019: Ojie Edoburun

== India ==
- 1988: Canute Magalhaes
- 1989: Anand Shetty
- 1990: Selvaraj Roberts
- 1991: Selvaraj Roberts
- 1992: Selvaraj Roberts
- 1993: M.S. Sridharan
- 1994: Salaam Gariba GHA
- 1995:
- 1996: Amit Khanna
- 1997:
- 1998: Amit Khanna
- 1999: Anil Kumar
- 2000: Sachin Navale
- 2001: Anil Kumar
- 2002: Sanjay Ghosh
- 2003: Vilas Nilgund
- 2004: Piyush Kumar
- 2005: Anil Kumar

== Italy ==
- 1970: Ennio Preatoni
- 1971: Norberto Oliosi
- 1972: Vincenzo Guerini
- 1973: Luigi Benedetti
- 1974: Pietro Mennea
- 1975: Pasqualino Abeti
- 1976: Vincenzo Guerini
- 1977: Luciano Caravani
- 1978: Pietro Mennea
- 1979: Mauro Zuliani
- 1980: Pietro Mennea
- 1981: Diego Nodari
- 1982: Pierfrancesco Pavoni
- 1983: Pierfrancesco Pavoni
- 1984: Stefano Tilli
- 1985: Carlo Simionato
- 1986: Stefano Tilli
- 1987: Pierfrancesco Pavoni
- 1988: Antonio Ullo
- 1989: Stefano Tilli
- 1990: Stefano Tilli
- 1991: Ezio Madonia
- 1992: Stefano Tilli
- 1993: Ezio Madonia
- 1994: Sandro Floris
- 1995: Giovanni Puggioni
- 1996: Giovanni Puggioni
- 1997: Stefano Tilli
- 1998: Francesco Scuderi
- 1999: Andrea Colombo
- 2000: Francesco Scuderi
- 2001: Francesco Scuderi
- 2002: Francesco Scuderi
- 2003: Francesco Scuderi
- 2004: Simone Collio
- 2005: Simone Collio
- 2006: Luca Verdecchia
- 2007: Koura Kaba Fantoni
- 2008: Fabio Cerutti
- 2009: Simone Collio
- 2010: Simone Collio
- 2011: Matteo Galvan
- 2012: Fabio Cerutti (2)
- 2013: Delmas Obou
- 2014: Delmas Obou
- 2015: Fabio Cerutti
- 2016: Filippo Tortu
- 2017: Federico Cattaneo
- 2018: Marcell Jacobs
- 2019: Marcell Jacobs
- 2020: Marcell Jacobs
- 2021: Marcell Jacobs
- 2022: Marcell Jacobs
- 2023: Samuele Ceccarelli

== Jamaica ==
- 1983: Everald Samuels
- 1984: Raymond Stewart
- 1985: ???
- 1986: Raymond Stewart
- 1987: Raymond Stewart
- 1988: Raymond Stewart
- 1989: Raymond Stewart
- 1990: John Mair
- 1991: Raymond Stewart
- 1992: Raymond Stewart
- 1993: Michael Green
- 1994: Michael Green
- 1995: Michael Green
- 1996: Michael Green
- 1997: Percival Spencer
- 1998: Garth Robinson
- 1999: Patrick Jarret
- 2000: Christopher Williams
- 2001: Lindel Frater
- 2002: Dwight Thomas
- 2003: Asafa Powell
- 2004: Asafa Powell
- 2005: Asafa Powell
- 2006: Michael Frater
- 2007: Asafa Powell
- 2008: Usain Bolt
- 2009: Usain Bolt
- 2010: Oshane Bailey
- 2011: Asafa Powell
- 2012: Yohan Blake
- 2013: Usain Bolt
- 2014: Nickel Ashmeade
- 2015: Asafa Powell
- 2016: Yohan Blake
- 2017: Yohan Blake
- 2018: Tyquendo Tracey
- 2019: Yohan Blake
- 2020: ???
- 2021: Tyquendo Tracey
- 2022: Yohan Blake

== Japan ==
The information taken from JAAF website.

- 1970: Masahide Jinno
- 1971: Masahide Jinno
- 1972: Takao Ishizawa
- 1973: Masahide Jinno
- 1974: Masahide Jinno
- 1975: Masahide Jinno
- 1976: Hiromichi Tazaki
- 1977: Toshio Toyota
- 1978: Akira Harada
- 1979: Toshio Toyota
- 1980: Yasuhiro Harada
- 1981: Yoshihiro Shimizu
- 1982: Yoshihiro Shimizu
- 1983: Hirofumi Miyazaki
- 1984: Kaoru Matsubara
- 1985: Hirofumi Miyazaki
- 1986: Hirofumi Miyazaki
- 1987: Kaoru Matsubara
- 1988: Takahiro Kasahara
- 1989: Shinji Aoto
- 1990: Robson da Silva (BRA)
- 1991: Bruny Surin (CAN)
- 1992: Hisatsugu Suzuki
- 1993: Satoru Inoue
- 1994: Satoru Inoue
- 1995: Yoshitaka Ito
- 1996: Nobuharu Asahara
- 1997: Nobuharu Asahara
- 1998: Koji Ito
- 1999: Hiroyasu Tsuchie
- 2000: Nobuharu Asahara
- 2001: Nobuharu Asahara
- 2002: Nobuharu Asahara
- 2003: Shingo Suetsugu
- 2004: Shingo Suetsugu
- 2005: Shinya Saburi
- 2006: Naoki Tsukahara
- 2007: Naoki Tsukahara
- 2008: Naoki Tsukahara
- 2009: Masashi Eriguchi
- 2010: Masashi Eriguchi
- 2011: Masashi Eriguchi
- 2012: Masashi Eriguchi
- 2013: Ryota Yamagata
- 2014: Yoshihide Kiryu
- 2015: Kei Takase
- 2016: Asuka Cambridge
- 2017: Abdul Hakim Sani Brown
- 2018: Ryota Yamagata
- 2019: Abdul Hakim Sani Brown
- 2020: Yoshihide Kiryu
- 2021: Shuhei Tada
- 2022: Abdul Hakim Sani Brown

== Latvia ==
- 1991: Aleksejs Iljušinš
- 1992: Guntis Zâlîtis
- 1993: Guntis Zâlîtis
- 1994: Alberts Baturins
- 1995: Sergejs Inšakovs
- 1996: Sergejs Inšakovs
- 1997: Sergejs Inšakovs
- 1998: Ingūns Svikliņš
- 1999: Stanislavs Olijars
- 2000: Sergejs Inšakovs
- 2001: Sergejs Inšakovs
- 2002: Sergejs Inšakovs
- 2003: Sandis Sabâjevs
- 2004: Dmitrijs Hadakovs
- 2005: Sandis Sabâjevs
- 2006: Ronalds Arājs
- 2007: ???
- 2008: Māris Grēniņš
- 2009: Ronalds Arājs
- 2010: Ronalds Arājs

== Lithuania ==
- 1990: Eimantas Skrabulis
- 1991: Vilmantas Pipiras
- 1992: Kastytis Klimas
- 1993: Kastytis Klimas
- 1994: Vilmantas Pipiras
- 1995: Saulius Urbutis
- 1996: Donatas Jakševicius
- 1997: Donatas Jakševicius
- 1998: Donatas Jakševicius
- 1999: Stanislav Michno
- 2000: Ilja Andriusenko
- 2001: Sigitas Kavaliauskas
- 2002: Dainius Šerpytis
- 2003: Andrius Kacénas
- 2004: Andrius Kacénas
- 2005: Justas Buragas
- 2006: Rytis Sakalauskas
- 2007: Žilvinas Adomavičius
- 2008: Rytis Sakalauskas
- 2009: Rytis Sakalauskas
- 2010: Martas Skrabulis
- 2011: Rytis Sakalauskas
- 2012: Mantas Šilkauskas

== Netherlands ==
- 1970: Ad de Jong
- 1971: Eddy Monsels (SUR)
- 1972: Bert de Jager
- 1973: Bert de Jager
- 1974: Bert de Jager
- 1975: Sammy Monsels (SUR)
- 1976: Bert de Jager
- 1977: Bert de Jager
- 1978: Raymond Heerenveen (AHO)
- 1979: Raymond Heerenveen (AHO)
- 1980: Ed Pireau
- 1981: Ed Pireau
- 1982: Mario Westbroek
- 1983: Sammy Monsels (SUR)
- 1984: Peter van der Heyden
- 1985: Peter van der Heyden
- 1986: Ahmed de Kom
- 1987: Ahmed de Kom
- 1988: Ahmed de Kom
- 1989: Emiel Mellaard
- 1990: Paul Franklin
- 1991: Paul Franklin
- 1992: Frank Perri
- 1993: Frank Perri
- 1994: Regilio van der Vloot
- 1995: Regilio van der Vloot
- 1996: Patrick van Balkom
- 1997: Patrick van Balkom
- 1998: Patrick van Balkom
- 1999: Nathanael Esprit (AHO)
- 2000: Martin Ungerer
- 2001: Troy Douglas
- 2002: Troy Douglas
- 2003: Timothy Beck
- 2004: Troy Douglas
- 2005: Guus Hoogmoed
- 2006: Caimin Douglas (AHO)
- 2007: Guus Hoogmoed
- 2008: Patrick van Luijk
- 2009: Patrick van Luijk
- 2010: Caimin Douglas (AHO)
- 2011: Churandy Martina
- 2012: Churandy Martina
- 2013: Churandy Martina
- 2014: Churandy Martina
- 2015: Churandy Martina
- 2016: Churandy Martina

== New Zealand ==
- 1970: Laurie D'Arcy
- 1971: Bevan Smith
- 1972: Laurie D'Arcy
- 1973: Steve Erkkila
- 1974: Bevan Smith
- 1975: Steve Erkkila
- 1976: Ross Pownall
- 1977: Steve Erkkila
- 1978: Graeme French
- 1979: Shane Downey
- 1980: Peter Hunt
- 1981: Shane Downey
- 1982: Gary Henley-Smith
- 1983: Gary Henley-Smith
- 1984: Joe Leota
- 1985: Rhys Dacre
- 1986: Dale McClunie
- 1987: Shane Downey
- 1988: Simon Poelman
- 1989: Murray Gutry
- 1990: Mark Woods
- 1991: Augustine Nketia (GHA)
- 1992: Augustine Nketia
- 1993: Augustine Nketia
- 1994: Augustine Nketia
- 1995: Mark Keddell
- 1996: Augustine Nketia
- 1997: Chris Donaldson
- 1998: Matthew Coad
- 1999: Chris Donaldson
- 2000: Chris Donaldson
- 2001: Matthew Coad
- 2002: James Dolphin
- 2003: Donald MacDonald
- 2004: Donald MacDonald
- 2005: James Dolphin
- 2006: James Dolphin
- 2007: James Dolphin + Chris Donaldson
- 2008: Chris Donaldson
- 2009: C. Van der Speck
- 2010: C. Van der Speck
- 2011: C. Van der Speck
- 2012: Joseph Millar
- 2013: Joseph Millar
- 2014: Joseph Millar
- 2015: Kodi Harman
- 2016: Matthew Wyatt

== Nigeria ==
- 2005: Uchenna Emedolu
- 2008: Obinna Metu
- 2009: Obinna Metu
- 2010: Obinna Metu
- 2011: Ogho-Oghene Egwero
- 2012: Obinna Metu
- 2013: Ogho-Oghene Egwero
- 2014: Mark Jelks
- 2015: Seye Ogunlewe

== Norway ==
- 1970: Richard Simonsen
- 1971: Ole Egil Reitan
- 1972: Audun Garshol
- 1973: Audun Garshol
- 1974: Audun Garshol
- 1975: Audun Garshol
- 1976: Audun Garshol
- 1977: Øyvind Røst
- 1978: Knut M. Stokke
- 1979: Knut M. Stokke
- 1980: Kåre Magne Åmot
- 1981: Kåre Magne Åmot
- 1982: Tore Bergan
- 1983: Tore Bergan
- 1984: Tore Bergan
- 1985: Einar Sagli
- 1986: Einar Sagli
- 1987: Aham Okeke
- 1988: Einar Sagli
- 1989: Geir Moen
- 1990: Aham Okeke
- 1991: Aham Okeke
- 1992: Geir Moen
- 1993: Geir Moen
- 1994: Geir Moen
- 1995: Geir Moen
- 1996: Geir Moen
- 1997: Geir Moen
- 1998: Geir Moen
- 1999: Geir Moen
- 2000: John Ertzgaard
- 2001: John Ertzgaard
- 2002: Geir Moen
- 2003: Aham Okeke
- 2004: Aham Okeke
- 2005: Martin Rypdal
- 2006: Martin Rypdal
- 2007: Jaysuma Saidy Ndure
- 2008: Jaysuma Saidy Ndure
- 2009: Christian Mogstad

== Poland ==
- 1970: Zenon Nowosz
- 1971: Wiesław Maniak
- 1972: Hermes Ramírez (CUB)
- 1973: Zenon Nowosz
- 1974: Andrzej Świerczyński
- 1975: Andrzej Świerczyński
- 1976: Zenon Licznerski
- 1977: Zenon Licznerski
- 1978: Marian Woronin
- 1979: Marian Woronin
- 1980: Marian Woronin
- 1981: Marian Woronin
- 1982: Marian Woronin
- 1983: Marian Woronin
- 1984: Leszek Dunecki
- 1985: Marian Woronin
- 1986: Czesław Prądzyński
- 1987: Czesław Prądzyński
- 1988: Marian Woronin
- 1989: Jacek Marlicki
- 1990: Jacek Marlicki
- 1991: Jarosław Kaniecki
- 1992: Marek Zalewski
- 1993: Marek Zalewski
- 1994: Marek Zalewski
- 1995: Marek Zalewski
- 1996: Ryszard Pilarczyk
- 1997: Ryszard Pilarczyk
- 1998: Marcin Krzywański
- 1999: Piotr Balcerzak
- 2000: Marcin Nowak
- 2001: Marcin Krzywański
- 2002: Marcin Urbaś
- 2003: Marcin Jędrusiński
- 2004: Łukasz Chyła
- 2005: Michał Bielczyk
- 2006: Dariusz Kuć
- 2007: Marcin Jędrusiński
- 2008: Dariusz Kuć
- 2009: Dariusz Kuć
- 2010: Robert Kubaczyk
- 2011: Paweł Stempel
- 2012: Dariusz Kuć
- 2013: Karol Zalewski
- 2014: Karol Zalewski
- 2015: Przemysław Słowikowski
- 2016: Karol Zalewski
- 2017: Karol Zalewski
- 2018: Dominik Kopeć
- 2019: Dominik Kopeć

== Portugal ==
- 1970: Paulo Pereira
- 1971: António Fonseca e Silva
- 1972: João Jorge
- 1973: António Manso
- 1974: António Cachola
- 1975: António Cachola
- 1976: Vítor Mano
- 1977: Vítor Mano
- 1978: Vítor Mano
- 1979: Vítor Mano
- 1980: Daniel Monteiro
- 1981: Daniel Monteiro
- 1982: António Cachola
- 1983: Luís Barroso
- 1984: Luís Barroso
- 1985: Luís Barroso
- 1986: Arnaldo Abrantes
- 1987: Luís Barroso
- 1988: Pedro Agostinho
- 1989: Paulo Curvelo
- 1990: Pedro Agostinho
- 1991: Pedro Agostinho
- 1992: Luís Cunha
- 1993: Pedro Agostinho
- 1994: Luís Cunha
- 1995: Luís Cunha
- 1996: Carlos Calado
- 1997: Mário Barbosa
- 1998: Mário Barbosa
- 1999: Carlos Calado
- 2000: Ricardo Alves
- 2001: Ricardo Alves
- 2002: Hidberto Almeida
- 2003: Ricardo Alves
- 2004: Francis Obikwelu
- 2005: Francis Obikwelu
- 2006: Francis Obikwelu
- 2007: Arnaldo Abrantes
- 2008: João Ferreira
- 2009: Francis Obikwelu
- 2010: Francis Obikwelu
- 2011: Yazaldes Nascimento
- 2012: Carlos Nascimento
- 2013: Yazaldes Nascimento
- 2014: Yazaldes Nascimento
- 2015: Yazaldes Nascimento
- 2016: Diogo Antunes
- 2017: Diogo Antunes
- 2018: Carlos Nascimento
- 2019: Diogo Antunes
- 2020: José Pedro Lopes

== Russia ==
- 1992: Aleksandr Porkhomovskiy
- 1993: Aleksandr Porkhomovskiy
- 1994: Aleksandr Porkhomovskiy
- 1995: Andrey Grigoryev
- 1996: Andrey Fedoriv
- 1997: Andrey Fedoriv
- 1998: Aleksandr Porkhomovskiy
- 1999: Sergey Slukin
- 2000: Sergey Bychkov
- 2001: Sergey Bychkov
- 2002: Sergey Bychkov
- 2003: Aleksandr Smirnov
- 2004: Andrey Yepishin
- 2005: Andrey Yepishin
- 2006: Andrey Yepishin

== South Africa ==
- 2009: Simon Magakwe
- 2010: Simon Magakwe
- 2011: Simon Magakwe
- 2013: Simon Magakwe
- 2014: Simon Magakwe
- 2015: Akani Simbine
- 2016: Henricho Bruintjies

== Spain ==
- 1970: Juan Carlos Jones
- 1971: Sánchez Paraíso
- 1972: Sánchez Paraíso
- 1973: Sánchez Paraíso
- 1974: José Luis Sarriá
- 1975: Josep Carbonell
- 1976: Javier Martínez
- 1977: Ángel Ibáñez
- 1978: José Luis Sarriá
- 1979: Sánchez Paraíso
- 1980: Javier Martínez
- 1981: Josep Carbonell
- 1982: Javier Martínez
- 1983: Juan José Prado
- 1984: Javier Arques
- 1985: Javier Arques
- 1986: Javier Arques
- 1987: Javier Arques
- 1988: Javier Arques
- 1989: Javier Arques
- 1990: Enrique Talavera
- 1991: Enrique Talavera
- 1992: Sergio López
- 1993: Enrique Talavera
- 1994: Pedro Pablo Nolet
- 1995: Francisco Javier Navarro
- 1996: Venancio José
- 1997: Frutos Feo
- 1998: Frutos Feo
- 1999: Pedro Pablo Nolet
- 2000: Venancio José
- 2001: Diego Moisés Santos
- 2002: Orkatz Beitia
- 2003: Orkatz Beitia
- 2004: Iván Mocholí
- 2005: Orkatz Beitia
- 2006: A. David Rodríguez
- 2007: A. David Rodríguez
- 2008: Iván Mocholí
- 2009: A. David Rodríguez
- 2010: A. David Rodríguez
- 2011: A. David Rodríguez
- 2012: A. David Rodríguez
- 2013: A. David Rodríguez
- 2014: Adrià Burriel
- 2015: A. David Rodríguez
- 2016: A. David Rodríguez
- 2017: A. David Rodríguez
- 2018: Aitor Same Ekobo
- 2019: Sergio Juárez
- 2020: Pablo Montalvo
- 2021: Sergio López
- 2022: Sergio López
- 2023: Sergio López

== Sweden ==
- 1970: Anders Faager
- 1971: Thorsten Johansson
- 1972: Anders Faager
- 1973: Thorsten Johansson
- 1974: Christer Garpenborg
- 1975: Christer Garpenborg
- 1976: Christer Garpenborg
- 1977: Christer Garpenborg
- 1978: Christer Garpenborg
- 1979: Christer Garpenborg
- 1980: Dan Orbe
- 1981: Christer Garpenborg
- 1982: Stefan Nilsson
- 1983: Stefan Nilsson
- 1984: Tommy Johansson
- 1985: Per-Ola Olsson
- 1986: Peter Eriksson
- 1987: Robert Nilsson
- 1988: Thomas Leandersson
- 1989: Marty Krulee (USA)
- 1990: Marty Krulee (USA)
- 1991: Marty Krulee (USA)
- 1992: Thomas Leandersson
- 1993: Peter Karlsson
- 1994: Peter Karlsson
- 1995: Matias Ghansah
- 1996: Peter Karlsson
- 1997: Torbjörn Mårtensson
- 1998: Patrik Lövgren
- 1999: Lenny Martinez
- 2000: Torbjörn Mårtensson
- 2001: Mikael Ahl
- 2002: Patrik Lövgren
- 2003: Johan Engberg
- 2004: Johan Wissman
- 2005: Per Strandquist
- 2006: Daniel Persson

== Trinidad and Tobago ==
- 1970: Keith Holder
- 1971: -
- 1972: Hasely Crawford
- 1973: Ainsley Armstrong
- 1974: Charles Joseph
- 1975: Hasely Crawford
- 1976: Hasely Crawford
- 1977: Ephraim Serrette
- 1978: Christopher Brathwaite
- 1979: Hasely Crawford
- 1980: Hasely Crawford
- 1981: Ephraim Serrette
- 1982: Alexander Smith
- 1983: Christopher Brathwaite
- 1984: ???
- 1985: Anthony Munroe
- 1986: Ronnell Barclay
- 1987: Dazel Jules
- 1988: Ronnell Barclay
- 1989: ???
- 1990: -
- 1991: ???
- 1992: ???
- 1993: Ato Boldon
- 1994: Ato Boldon
- 1995: Alvin Daniel
- 1996: Wendell Williams
- 1997: Errol Lewis
- 1998: Niconnor Alexander
- 1999: Niconnor Alexander
- 2000: Niconnor Alexander
- 2001: Darrel Brown
- 2002: Marc Burns
- 2003: Jacey Harper
- 2004: Ato Boldon
- 2005: Marc Burns
- 2006: Jacey Harper
- 2007: Darrel Brown
- 2008: Marc Burns
- 2009: Richard Thompson
- 2010: Richard Thompson
- 2011: Richard Thompson
- 2012: Keston Bledman
- 2013: Keston Bledman
- 2014: Richard Thompson
- 2015: Keston Bledman

== Ukraine ==
- 1992: Kostyantyn Gromadskyi
- 1993: Oleksandr Shlychkov
- 1994: Vladyslav Dolohodin
- 1995: Oleksiy Chykhachov
- 1996: Serhiy Osovych
- 1997: Vladyslav Dolohodin
- 1998: Anatoliy Dovhal
- 1999: Kostyantyn Rurak
- 2000: Kostyantyn Rurak
- 2001: Anatoliy Dovgal
- 2002: Kostyantyn Rurak
- 2003: Kostyantyn Rurak
- 2004: Anatoliy Dovhal
- 2005: Anatoliy Dovhal
- 2006: Anatoliy Dovhal
- 2007: Dmytro Hlushchenko
- 2008: Dmytro Hlushchenko
- 2009: Kostyantyn Vasyukov
- 2010: Serhiy Smelyk
- 2011: Ihor Bodrov
- 2012: Serhiy Smelyk
- 2013: Vitaliy Korzh
- 2014: Ihor Bodrov
- 2015: Vitaliy Korzh
- 2016: Ihor Bodrov
- 2017: Serhiy Smelyk
- 2018: Serhiy Smelyk
- 2019: Stanislav Kovalenko
- 2020: Oleksandr Sokolov

== United States ==
- 1970: Ivory Crockett
- 1971: Del Meriwether
- 1972: Robert Taylor
- 1973: Steve Williams
- 1974: Steve Williams
- 1975: Don Quarrie (JAM)
- 1976: Christer Garpenborg (SWE)
- 1977: Don Quarrie (JAM)
- 1978: Clancy Edwards
- 1979: James Sanford
- 1980: Stanley Floyd
- 1981: Carl Lewis
- 1982: Carl Lewis
- 1983: Carl Lewis
- 1984: Sam Graddy
- 1985: Kirk Baptiste
- 1986: Carl Lewis
- 1987: Mark Witherspoon
- 1988: Emmit King
- 1989: Leroy Burrell
- 1990: Carl Lewis
- 1991: Leroy Burrell
- 1992: Dennis Mitchell
- 1993: Andre Cason
- 1994: Dennis Mitchell
- 1995: Michael Marsh
- 1996: Dennis Mitchell
- 1997: Maurice Greene
- 1998: Tim Harden
- 1999: Brian Lewis
- 2000: Maurice Greene
- 2001: Bernard Williams
- 2002: Maurice Greene
- 2003: Bernard Williams
- 2004: Maurice Greene
- 2005: Justin Gatlin
- 2006: Tyson Gay
- 2007: Tyson Gay
- 2008: Tyson Gay
- 2009: Mike Rodgers
- 2010: Walter Dix
- 2011: Walter Dix
- 2012: Justin Gatlin
- 2013: Justin Gatlin
- 2014: Mike Rodgers
- 2015: Tyson Gay
- 2016: Justin Gatlin
- 2017: Justin Gatlin
- 2018: Noah Lyles
- 2019: Christian Coleman
- 2020: Cancelled due to COVID-19
- 2021: Trayvon Bromell
- 2022: Fred Kerley
- 2023: Cravont Charleston

== See also ==
- List of 100 metres national champions (women)
