= Masters M35 100 metres world record progression =

This is the progression of world record improvements of the 100 metres M35 division of Masters athletics.

Key

Incomplete information Wind aided Pending

Hand	Auto	Wind	Athlete	Nationality	Birthdate	Age	Location	Date	Ref
	9.87	(−0.1 m/s)	Justin Gatlin	United States	10 February 1982	37 years, 140 days	Stanford	30 June 2019	
	9.92	(−0.8 m/s)	Justin Gatlin	United States	10 February 1982	35 years, 176 days	London	5 August 2017	
	9.95	-0.7	Justin Gatlin	United States	10 February 1982	35 years, 133 days	Sacramento	23 June 2017	
	9.96	+1.0	Kim Collins	Saint Kitts and Nevis	05 April 1976	38 years, 106 days	London	20 July 2014	
	9.97 A	0.1	Linford Christie	United Kingdom	02 April 1960	35 years, 174 days	Johannesburg	23 September 1995	
	9.97	2.0	Kim Collins	Saint Kitts and Nevis	05 April 1976	37 years, 90 days	Lausanne	04 July 2013	
	10.00	0.1	Linford Christie	United Kingdom	02 April 1960	35 years, 166 days	Tokyo	15 September 1995	
	10.03	-1.0	Linford Christie	United Kingdom	02 April 1960	35 years, 136 days	Zurich	16 August 1995	
	10.05	2.0	Linford Christie	United Kingdom	02 April 1960	35 years, 83 days	Villeneuve d'Ascq	24 June 1995	
	10.28	1.2	Allan Wells	United Kingdom	03 May 1952	35 years, 90 days	London	01 August 1987	
	10.43	1.7	Chris Brathwaite	Trinidad and Tobago	12 August 1948	46 years, 259 days	Walnut	28 April 1984	
	10.50		Delano Meriwether	United States	23 April 1943	36 years, 5 days	Philadelphia	28 April 1979	
10.3			Arquimedes Herrera	Venezuela	08 August 1935	35 years, 21 days	Maracaibo	29 August 1970	
	10.56	0.2	Ron Jones	United Kingdom	19 August 1934	35 years, 11 days	London	30 August 1969	

== External Resources ==
Masters Athletics 100 m list
