= 2014 Spanish Athletics Championships =

- Dates: 26–27 July 2014
- Host city: Alcobendas, Spain
- Venue: Polideportivo José Caballero

The 2014 Spanish Athletics Championships was the 94th edition of the national championship in outdoor track and field for Spain. It was held on 26 and 27 July at the Polideportivo José Caballero in Alcobendas. It served as the selection meeting for Spain at the 2014 European Athletics Championships.

The club championships in relays and combined track and field events were contested separately from the main competition.

== Results ==
=== Men ===
Event	Gold		Silver		Bronze	
100 metres	Adrià Burriel; FC Barcelona	10.34	Sergio Ruiz; JA Sabadell	10.46	Ruben Pros; FC Barcelona	10.64
200 metres	Iván Jesús Ramos; FC Barcelona	20.84	Sergio Ruiz; JA Sabadell	20.87	Alberto Salcedo; SG Pontevedra	21.26
400 metres	Samuel García; Tenerife CajaCanarias	45.50	Mark Ujakpor; Playas de Castellón	46.29	Lucas Búa; FC Barcelona	46.57
800 metres	Kevin López; CD Nike Running	1:47.15	Álvaro de Arriba; Rincón Oeste	1:47.42	Luis Alberto Marco; CD Nike Running	1:47.82
1500 metres	Manuel Olmedo; FC Barcelona	3:42.06	Adel Mechaal; AA Palamós	3:42.28	David Bustos; CD Nike Running	3:42.95
5000 metres	Antonio Abadía; Simply-Scorpio 71	13:48.69	Roberto Aláiz; CD Nike Running	13:48.74	Jesús España; AA Valdemora	13:48.84
110 m hurdles	Javier Colomo; Ederki-Caja Rural	13.74	Jackson Quiñónez; FC Barcelona	13.94	Francisco Javier López; Playas de Castellón	13.95
400 m hurdles	Sergio Fernández; Pamplona Atlético	49.90	Robert Díez Ibáñez; Huracán Fent Camí	50.37	Ignacio Sarmiento; SG Pontevedra	50.63
3000 m s'chase	Víctor García; Gesfie VG Running	8:37.10	Sebastián Martos; CD Nike Running	8:37.80	Fernando Carro; Playas de Castellón	8:40.43
High jump	Miguel Ángel Sancho; Playas de Castellón	2.22 m	Javier Bermejo; FC Barcelona	2.20 m	Simón Siverio; Tenerife CajaCanarias	2.17 m
Pole vault	Igor Bychkov; Playas de Castellón	5.45 m	Didac Salas; FC Barcelona	5.45 m	Manel Concepción; FC Barcelona	5.35 m
Long jump	Eusebio Cáceres; CD Nike Running	8.08 m	Jean Marie Okutu; FC Barcelona	7.99 m	Sergio Solanas; AD Marathon	7.52 m
Triple jump	Pablo Torrijos; Playas de Castellón	16.87 m CR	Jorge Gimeno; Playas de Castellón	16.35 m	José Emilio Bellido; Playas de Castellón	16.18 m
Shot put	Borja Vivas; At. Málaga	21.07 m CR	Yioser Toledo; Playas de Castellón	20.25 m	Carlos Tobalina; FC Barcelona	20.15 m
Discus throw	Frank Casañas; Playas de Castellón	61.15 m	Pedro José Cuesta; FC Barcelona	56.52 m	Joaquín Millán; Tenerife CajaCanarias	55.53 m
Hammer throw	Javier Cienfuegos; Atlético Montijo	70.59 m	Isaac Vicente; AD Marathon	70.07 m	Pedro José Martín; FC Barcelona	66.78 m
Javelin throw	Jordi Sánchez Fernández; FC Barcelona	73.88 m	Manuel Uriz; Huracán Fent Camí	69.17 m	Borja Barbeito; Playas de Castellón	69.10 m
10,000 m walk	Miguel Ángel López; UCAM - Athleo Cieza	38:54.87	Luis Alberto Amezcua; Juventud Guadix	40:37.17	Álvaro Martín; Playas de Castellón	41:40.97
Decathlon	Javier Pérez; Tenerife CajaCanarias	7396 pts	Jonay Jordan; Tenerife CajaCanarias	7239 pts	Vicente Guardiola; UCAM-Cartagena	6990 pts
4 × 100 m relay	Playas de Castellón; Patrick Ike Chinedu; Francisco Javier López; Alberto Gavaldá; Daniel Mazón Toledo	40.21	Huracán Fent Camí; Ivan Martínez Linuesa; Robert Díez Ibáñez; José Antonio Vizuete Pérez; Óscar Adrián López Rodenas	40.83	Pamplona Atlético; Ignacio Camino Lacarte; Urko Azpilicueta Pérez; Iker Lekunberri Mendez; Jorge Illarramendi Esteban	41.19
4 × 400 m relay	Playas de Castellón; David Jimenez Herrera; Daniel Andújar; Alberto Gavaldá; Mark Ujakpor	3:08.33 CR	FC Barcelona; Lucas Búa; Ignacio Laguna Aparicio; Sergi Torres Sola; Pau Fradera Miralles	3:08.46	A.D.Marathon; Jesús Pérez Ferreras; Manuel Sánchez Delgado; Guillermo Rojo Gil; Juliio Arenas Robles	3:09.48

=== Women ===
Event	Gold		Silver		Bronze	
100 metres	Estela García; Valencia Terra i Mar	11.72	María Isabel Pérez; Cueva de Nerja-UMA	11.92	Plácida Martínez; FC Barcelona	12.01
200 metres	Alba Fernández; Pamplona Atlético	24.04	Elena Moreno; Playas de Castellón	24.04	Sonia Molina-Prados; Bidezabal Atletismo	24.46
400 metres	Indira Terrero; Valencia Terra i Mar	51.77	Sara Gómez; CAS Ciudad Segovia	54.08	Geraxane Ussía; Simply-Scorpio 71	54.22
800 metres	Khadija Rahmouni; CD Nike Running	2:03.42	Esther Guerrero; FC Barcelona	2:03.88	Victoria Sauleda; ISS-L´Hospitalet	2:04.21
1500 metres	Nuria Fernández; CD Nike Running	4:20.26	Solange Pereira; Atletismo Bikila	4:21.29	Isabel Macías; Simply-Scorpio 71	4:24.15
5000 metres	Dolores Checa; CD Nike Running	15:51.24	Paula González; CDE González Berodia	16:16.05	Lidia Rodríguez; Atletismo Santutxu	16:19.24
100 m hurdles	Caridad Jerez; FC Barcelona	13.09	Josephine Onyia; Valencia Terra i Mar	13.38	Teresa Errandonea; Super Amara BAT	13.53
400 m hurdles	Laura Natalí Sotomayor; Valencia Terra i Mar	57.17	Olga Ortega; Valencia Terra i Mar	58.74	Alba Casanovas; FC Barcelona	59.29
3000 m s'chase	Diana Martín; Valencia Terra i Mar	10:03.97	Teresa Urbina; FC Barcelona	10:08.44	Diana Martín Hidalgo; C.D.Seoane Pampín	10:12.62
High jump	Ruth Beitia; Piélagos Inelecma	1.95 m	Gema Martín Pozuelo; Valencia Terra i Mar	1.81 m	Claudia García; FC Barcelona	1.78 m
Pole vault	Naroa Agirre; Atlético San Sebastián	4.42 m CR	Carla Franch; FC Barcelona	4.00 m	Rebeca Yagüe; Pamplona Atlético	4.00 m
Long jump	María del Mar Jover; Valencia Terra i Mar	6.59 m	Juliet Itoya; AD Marathon	6.59 m	Concepción Montaner; Playas de Castellón	6.23 m
Triple jump	Ruth Ndoumbe; Valencia Terra i Mar	14.15 m	Patricia Sarrapio; Playas de Castellón	13.86 m	Andrea Calleja; AD Marathon	13.60 m
Shot put	Úrsula Ruiz; Valencia Terra i Mar	17.15 m	María Belén Toimil; Playas de Castellón	15.35 m	Irache Quintanal; Valencia Terra i Mar	15.21 m
Discus throw	Sabina Asenjo; FC Barcelona	57.62 m	Irache Quintanal; Valencia Terra i Mar	51.23 m	Mercedes de Santalo; Playas de Castellón	50.71 m
Hammer throw	Berta Castells; Valencia Terra i Mar	68.10 m	María Barbaño Acevedo; AD Marathon	57.86 m	Cristina Santiago; AD Marathon	54.17 m
Javelin throw	Mercedes Chilla; Valencia Terra i Mar	55.94 m	Lidia Parada; Atlética Barbanza	53.62 m	Noraida Bicet; Valencia Terra i Mar	52.04 m
10,000 m walk	Júlia Takács; Playas de Castellón	42:23.37 NR	Raquel González; FC Barcelona	43:31.21	Beatriz Pascual; Valencia Terra i Mar	43:57.13
Heptathlon	Carmen Romero; Simply-Scorpio 71	5427 pts	Patricia Ortega; Atlético San Sebastián	5362 pts	Tamara del Río; A.A.Catalunya	5019 pts
4 × 100 m relay	Valencia Terra i Mar; Julia Canet Hermida; Cristina Castellar Barres; Estela García; Josephine Onyia	45.98	FC Barcelona; Carla Franch Almela; Plácida Martínez; Ingrid Andrés Bocanegra; Caridad Jerez	46.13	A.D.Marathon; Elisa Tejedor Pardiñas; Paula García; Monica Rayón Calderón; Juliet Itoya	46.30
4 × 400 m relay	Valencia Terra i Mar; Laura Natalí Sotomayor; Élian Périz; Olga Ortega Almagro; Indira Terrero	3:40.82	A.D.Marathon; Carolina Pacheco González; Carlota Serrano; María Victoria Priego Ruiz; Laura Bueno	3:43.92	A.A.Catalunya; Sara Dorda Sans; Zoya Naumov; Adhara Barril Navarro; Irene Bonilla Segura	3:44.20
