= Gary Henley-Smith =

New Zealand rugby league footballer and sprinter

Personal information
- Full name: Gary Julian Henley-Smith
- Nationality: New Zealand
- Born: 1959 (age 66–67) Auckland, New Zealand

Sport
- Sport: Men's athletics
- Events: 100 metres, 200 metres
- Club: Waitakere City Athletic Club

Rugby union career
- Position: Wing
Provincial / State sides
Years	Team	Apps	(Points)
1983	Auckland B	1	(8)
- Rugby league career

Playing information
- Position: Wing
Club
Years	Team	Pld	T	G	FG	P
1985	Wigan	7	2	0	0	8
1985–86	Fulham RLFC	18	8	0	0	32
	Total	25	10	0	0	40

Gary Julian Henley-Smith is a former New Zealand sprinter and professional rugby league footballer who played in the 1970s and 1980s. He played club-level rugby league for Wigan and Fulham RLFC as a wing.

== Early years ==
Henley-Smith attended Auckland Grammar School, where he was Auckland and New Zealand secondary schools senior boys 100m and 200m champion and held several records.

He held the New Zealand junior men's 100m and 200m records at 10.4s and 21.7s. His 10.4s 100m record, set in 1977, stood for 13 years.

== Athletics career ==
Henley-Smith was a member of the Oceania team at the World Cup in Germany in 1977. That same year he joined Washington State University on a scholarship, spending four years in the United States. When he returned he was a member of Waitakere City Athletic Club and was the New Zealand Amateur Athletic Association 100m and 200m national champion in 1982 and 1983.

He missed selection for the Commonwealth Games in 1978 due to a stress fracture.

He competed in New Zealand's 4 × 100 metres relay team at the 1990 Commonwealth Games in Auckland, and was awarded the New Zealand 1990 Commemoration Medal.

== Rugby career ==
=== Rugby union ===
Henley-Smith played rugby union in New Zealand, playing one game for Auckland B team in 1983.

=== Rugby league ===
Henley-Smith spent the 1985–86 Rugby Football League season playing rugby league in England, joining Wigan, he played right wing in Wigan's 14–8 victory over New Zealand in the 1985 New Zealand rugby league tour of Great Britain and France match at Central Park, Wigan on Sunday 6 October 1985, and played right wing (replaced by interchange/substitute Steve Hampson) in Wigan's 34–8 victory over Warrington in the 1985 Lancashire Cup Final during the 1985–86 season at Knowsley Road, St. Helens, on Sunday 13 October 1985.

== Later years ==
Henley-Smith spent a number of years as a physical education teacher at St Paul's Collegiate School in Hamilton, New Zealand, before moving to Scots College, Wellington as Director of Boarding.
