= 2012 Spanish Athletics Championships =

- Dates: 25–26 August 2012
- Host city: Pamplona, Spain
- Venue: Estadio Larrabide

The 2012 Spanish Athletics Championships was the 92nd edition of the national championship in outdoor track and field for Spain. It was held on 25 and 26 August at the Estadio Larrabide in Pamplona, Navarra. It did not serve as a national selection meeting that year, as it took place after the 2012 Summer Olympics. A total of 564 athletes (305 men and 259 women) from 102 clubs competed at the event.

The club championships in relays and combined track and field events were contested separately from the main competition.

== Results ==
=== Men ===
Event	Gold		Silver		Bronze	
100 metres	Ángel David Rodríguez; FC Barcelona	10.35	Alberto Gavaldá; Playas de Castellón	10.64	Josué Mena; Cueva de Nerja-UMA	10.77
200 metres	Ángel David Rodríguez; FC Barcelona	20.98	Iván Jesús Ramos; CAP Alcobendas	21.12	Sergio Ruiz; JA Sabadell	21.60
400 metres	Samuel García; Tenerife CajaCanarias	46.77	Roberto Briones; La Rioja Atletismo	47.44	Kevin López; CD Nike Running	47.52
800 metres	Luis Alberto Marco; CD Nike Running	1:47.77	Antonio Manuel Reina; CD Nike Running	1:47.84	David Palacio; FC Barcelona	1:48.49
1500 metres	David Bustos; ADA Calviá	3:45.93	Diego Ruiz; Atletismo Diego Ruiz	3:46.06	Álvaro Rodríguez; CD Nike Running	3:46.18
5000 metres	Kidane Tadesse (ERI); AD Marathon	13:50.09	Manuel Ángel Penas; Otsu - Colibrí Guadalajara	13:57.92	Alejandro Fernández; Ourense - Ac. Postal	14:03.92
110 m hurdles	Jackson Quiñónez; FC Barcelona	13.72	Francisco Javier López; Playas de Castellón	14.16	Juan Ramón Barragán; Unicaja Atletismo	14.19
400 m hurdles	Diego Cabello; Playas de Castellón	50.61	Ignacio Sarmiento; Ourense - Ac. Postal	51.27	Xavier Carrión; JA Sabadell	51.49
3000 m s'chase	Ángel Mullera; CA Lloret - La Selva	8:31.28	Antonio David Jiménez; Otsu - Colibrí Guadalajara	8:34.39	Eliseo Martín; Hinaco Monzón	8:38.58
10,000 m walk	Miguel Ángel López; UCAM - Athleo Cieza	40:25.31	Benjamín Sánchez; UCAM - Athleo Cieza	41:45.67	Luis Alberto Amezcua; Juventud Guadix	41:52.57
4 × 100 m relay	Playas de Castellón; Iván Martínez Linuesa; Carlos Martín-Sacristán Gandía; Alberto Gavaldá; Yunier Pérez (CUB)	40.31	FC Barcelona; Patrick Chinedu; Jackson Quiñónez; Robert Díez Ibáñez; Ángel David Rodríguez	40.34	Cueva de Nerja-UMA; Fernando Pérez Rodriguez; Josué Mena; Juan Pablo Acuña Pérez; Antonio Fernández Cerezo	41.75
4 × 400 m relay	Playas de Castellón; Miquel Castillo Cuesta; Diego Cabello Miñón; Ignacio Laguna Aparicio; Yeimer López	3:10.44	AD Marathon; Adrián González Velasco; Javier Cartagena Teigell; Miguel Cartagena Teigell; Youness Belkaifa	3:12.39	CAB Pto. Alicante; Erete Udomsinachi; José Fernando Díez Coméndez; Enrique González Sánchez; Alejandro Liñán Rimmer	3:13.90
Long jump	Eusebio Cáceres; Centre Esp. Colivenc	7.75 m	Jean Marie Okutu; SG Pontevedra	7.64 m	Sergio Solanas; AD Marathon	7.64 m
Triple jump	Vicente Docavo; Playas de Castellón	16.62 m	Jorge Gimeno; Playas de Castellón	16.09 m	José Emilio Bellido; Playas de Castellón	16.03 m
High jump	Javier Bermejo; FC Barcelona	2.18 m	Miguel Ángel Sancho; Playas de Castellón	2.15 m	Simón Siverio; Tenerife CajaCanarias	2.11 m
Pole vault	Igor Bychkov; Playas de Castellón	5.46 m	Albert Vélez; FC Barcelona	5.36 m	David Moya; AA Catalunya	5.16 m
Shot put	Borja Vivas; At. Málaga	19.44 m	Carlos Tobalina; Grupo ISN Navara At	18.74 m	Germán Millán; Tenerife CajaCanarias	18.71 m
Discus throw	Mario Pestano; Tenerife CajaCanarias	63.28 m	Frank Casañas; Playas de Castellón	63.27 m	Pedro José Cuesta; FC Barcelona	59.87 m
Hammer throw	Javier Cienfuegos; Playas de Castellón	74.44 m CR	Isaac Vicente; AD Marathon	68.79 m	Juan Vicente; Playas de Castellón	66.48 m
Javelin throw	Jordi Sánchez Fernández; FC Barcelona	68.67 m	José Manuel Vila; Playas de Castellón	68.47 m	Rafael Baraza; CAB Pto. Alicante	65.91 m
Decathlon	David Gómez Martínez; RC Celta	7580 pts	José María Peña Rosado; Unicaja Atletismo	6950 pts	Javier Perez Rasines; CAI GC CajaCanarias	6753 pts

=== Women ===
Event	Gold		Silver		Bronze	
100 metres	Concepción Montaner; CA L'Eliana	11.99	Juliet Itoya; AD Marathon	12.08	Sara María Santiago; CAI GC CajaCanarias	12.08
200 metres	Sara María Santiago; CAI GC CajaCanarias	24.16	Plácida Martínez; FC Barcelona	25.00	María del Pilar Cortacero; Cueva de Nerja-UMA	25.01
400 metres	Aauri Bokesa; Valencia Terra i Mar	53.94	Oyidiya Oji; ISS - L'Hospitalet	55.79	Natalia Romero; Unicaja Atletismo	55.81
800 metres	Khadija Rahmouni; AD Marathon	2:06.77	Isabel Macías; Valencia Terra i Mar	2:06.82	Belit Solar; Bidezábal Atletismo	2:08.35
1500 metres	Natalia Rodríguez; CD Nike Running	4:24.95	Isabel Macías; Valencia Terra i Mar	4:25.84	Solange Pereira; Atletismo Bikila	4:26.00
5000 metres	Nuria Fernández; CD Nike Running	17:02.78	Paula González; Piélagos Inelecma	17:07.63	Cristina Jordán; C Dental Seoane Pampín	17:08.70
100 m hurdles	Desirée Valderrama; Cueva de Nerja-UMA	14.27	Irene Almarcha; Playas de Castellón	14.45	María Ángeles Fuentes; AA Catalunya	14.48
400 m hurdles	Laura Natalí Sotomayor; CAB Pto. Alicante	58.15	Olga Ortega; Valencia Terra i Mar	58.59	Elia Vallés; AA Palamós	1:00.55
3000 m s'chase	Zulema Fuentes-Pila; Piélagos Inelecma	10:09.40	Eva Arias; Valencia Terra i Mar	10:10.81	Teresa Urbina; FC Barcelona	10:18.16
10,000 m walk	Beatriz Pascual; Valencia Terra i Mar	43:18.97	María José Poves; Simply - Scorpio 71	44:22.59	Júlia Takács; CAB Pto. Alicante	46:00.46
4 × 100 m relay	Cueva de Nerja-UMA; Lorena Laz Aragón; María del Pilar Cortacero; Araceli López Reina; Maria Isabel Pérez	47.38	AD Marathon; Mónica Rayón Calderón; Sandra Pérez García; Yolanda García Suárez; Juliet Itoya	47.74	At. San Sebastián; Ane Bengoa Azpiazu; Alazne Furundarena Sarriegi; Maitane Iruretagoiena Casco; Patricia Ortega Trincado	47.81
4 × 400 m relay	Valencia Terra i Mar; Aauri Bokesa; Olga Ortega Almagro; María Hernández Guardiola; Indira Terrero	3:42.01	Unicaja Atletismo; Alba López Calero; Maria Stephanie Thomas; Beatriz Bachero Mena; Natalia Romero	3:47.81	AD Marathon; Carolina Pacheco González; Yolanda García Suárez; María Victoria Priego Ruiz; Khadija Rahmouni El Alami	3:48.61
Long jump	María del Mar Jover; Valencia Terra i Mar	6.47 m	Concepción Montaner; CA L'Eliana	6.43 m	Juliet Itoya; AD Marathon	6.05 m
Triple jump	Patricia Sarrapio; Valencia Terra i Mar	13.74 m	Débora Calveras; FC Barcelona	12.98 m	Rebeca Azcona; Grupo ISN Navarra At	12.79 m
High jump	Ruth Beitia; Piélagos Inelecma	1.96 m	Gema Martín; Valencia Terra i Mar	1.86 m	Claudia García; FC Barcelona	1.83 m
Pole vault	Anna María Pinero; Valencia Terra i Mar	4.11 m	Naroa Agirre; At. San Sebastián	4.11 m	Carla Franch; Playas de Castellón	3.91 m
Shot put	Úrsula Ruiz; Valencia Terra i Mar	16.95 m	Nazaret Viesca; Grupo ISN Navarra At	14.98 m	María Belén Toimil; Playas de Castellón	14.91 m
Discus throw	Sabina Asenjo; FC Barcelona	55.32 m	Haja Gerewu; FC Barcelona	47.91 m	María Belén Toimil; Playas de Castellón	46.94 m
Hammer throw	Berta Castells; Valencia Terra i Mar	68.35 m	Laura Redondo; FC Barcelona	64.82 m	Lidia Gómez; AA Catalunya	55.00 m
Javelin throw	Nora Aída Bicet; Valencia Terra i Mar	56.50 m	Arantza Moreno; Bidezábal Atletismo	49.90 m	Elia Pascual; CA Igualada	49.79 m
Heptathlon	Laura Ginés; Simply - Scorpio 71	5501 pts	Caridad Jerez; AB Pto. Alicante	5021 pts	Cristina Teixeira; Simply - Scorpio 71	4942 pts

== Medallero ==
Rank	Club	Gold	Silver	Bronze	Total
1	Valencia Terra i Mar	9	5	0	14
2	Playas de Castellón	6	7	5	18
3	FC Barcelona	6	6	4	16
4	CD Nike Running	3	1	2	6
5	Piélagos Inelecma	2	1	0	3
6	Cueva de Nerja-UMA	2	0	3	5
7	Tenerife CajaCanarias	2	0	2	4
8	AD Marathon	1	4	3	8
9	CAB Pto. Alicante	1	1	3	5
10	Simply - Scorpio 71	1	1	1	3
11	UCAM - Athleo Cieza	1	1	0	2
11	Otsu - Colibrí Guadalajara	1	1	0	2
11	CA L'Eliana	1	1	0	2
14	CAI GC CajaCanarias	1	0	2	3
15	At. Málaga	1	0	1	2
16	ADA Calviá	1	0	0	1
16	Centre Esp. Colivenc	1	0	0	1
16	CA Llorte - La Selva	1	0	0	1
16	RC Celta	1	0	0	1
20	Unicaja Atletismo	0	2	2	4
21	Grupo ISN Navarra At	0	2	1	3
22	Ourense - Ac. Postal	0	2	0	2
23	At. San Sebastián	0	1	1	2
23	Bidezábal Atletismo	0	1	1	2
25	Atletismo Diego Ruiz	0	1	0	1
25	ISS - L'Hospitalet	0	1	0	1
25	CAP Alcobendas	0	1	0	1
25	La Rioja Atletismo	0	1	0	1
25	SG Pontevedra	0	1	0	1
30	AA Catalunya	0	0	3	3
31	JA Sabadell	0	0	2	2
32	AA Palamós	0	0	1	1
32	Atletismo Bikila	0	0	1	1
32	CA Igualada	0	0	1	1
32	Juventud Guadix	0	0	1	1
32	Hinaco Monzón	0	0	1	1
32	C Dental Seoane Pampín	0	0	1	1
Total		42	42	42	126
