= Anton Galkin =

Russian sprinter (born 1979)

Personal information
- Nationality: Russian
- Born: 20 February 1979 (age 46)

Sport
- Sport: Sprinting
- Event: 400 metres

Anton Galkin (born 20 February 1979) is a Russian sprinter. He competed in the men's 400 metres at the 2004 Summer Olympics.

== Records ==
Distance	Time	Date
200 m	20.74	13 June 2004
300 m	33.48	24 May 2001
400 m	44.83	31 July 2004

== See also ==
- List of doping cases in athletics
- List of 200 metres national champions (men)
