= Henk Brouwer =

Dutch sprinter

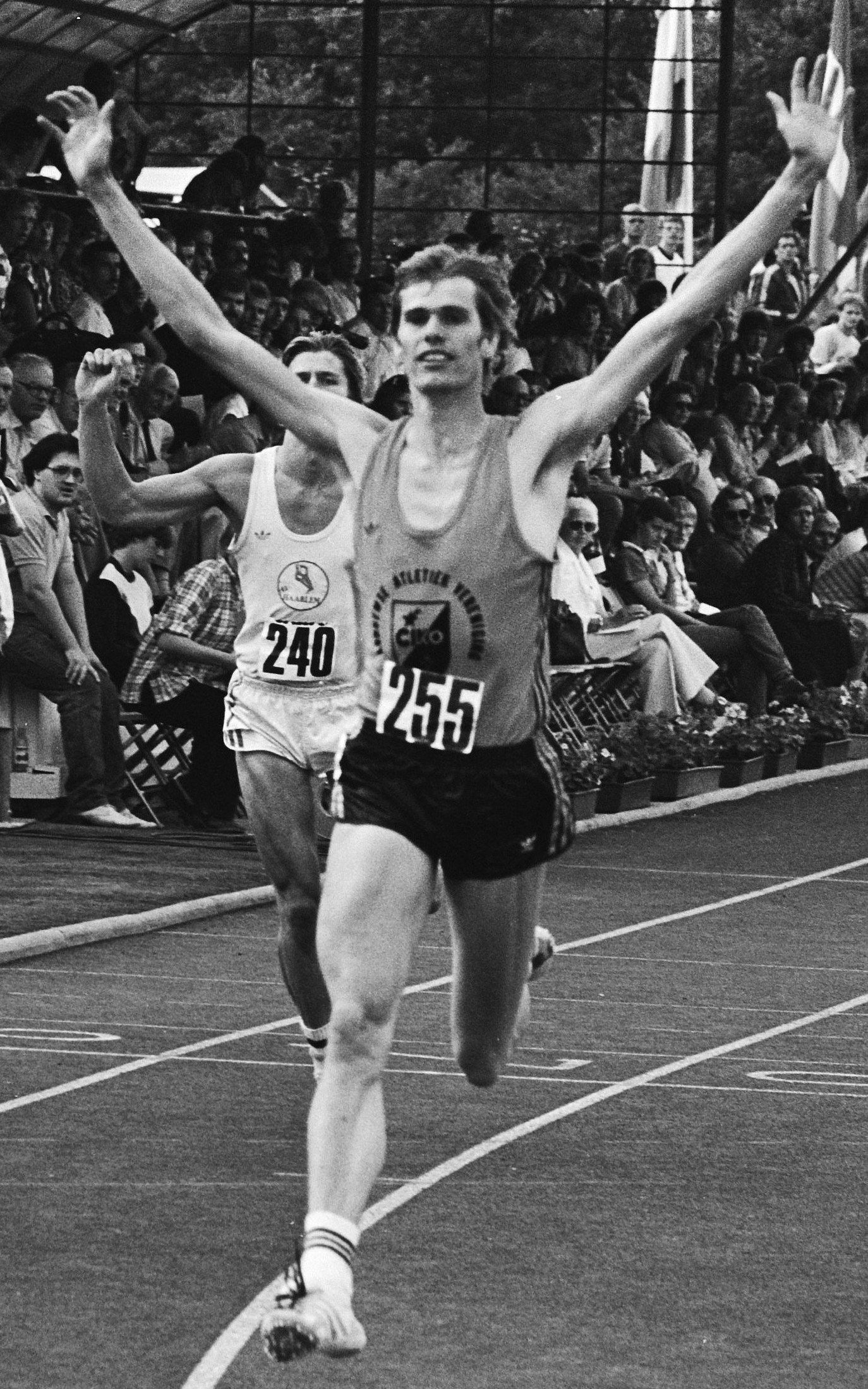
- Henk Brouwer in 1980

Personal information
- Born: 14 September 1953 (age 72) Winschoten, the Netherlands
- Height: 1.91 m (6 ft 3 in)
- Weight: 70 kg (150 lb)

Sport
- Sport: Sprint
- Club: CIKO '66, Arnhem

Melchior Hendrik "Henk" Brouwer (born 14 September 1953) is a retired Dutch sprinter. He competed at the 1980 Summer Olympics in the 200 m and 4 × 400 m events, but failed to reach the finals.
