= Claudinei da Silva =

Brazilian sprinter (born 1970)

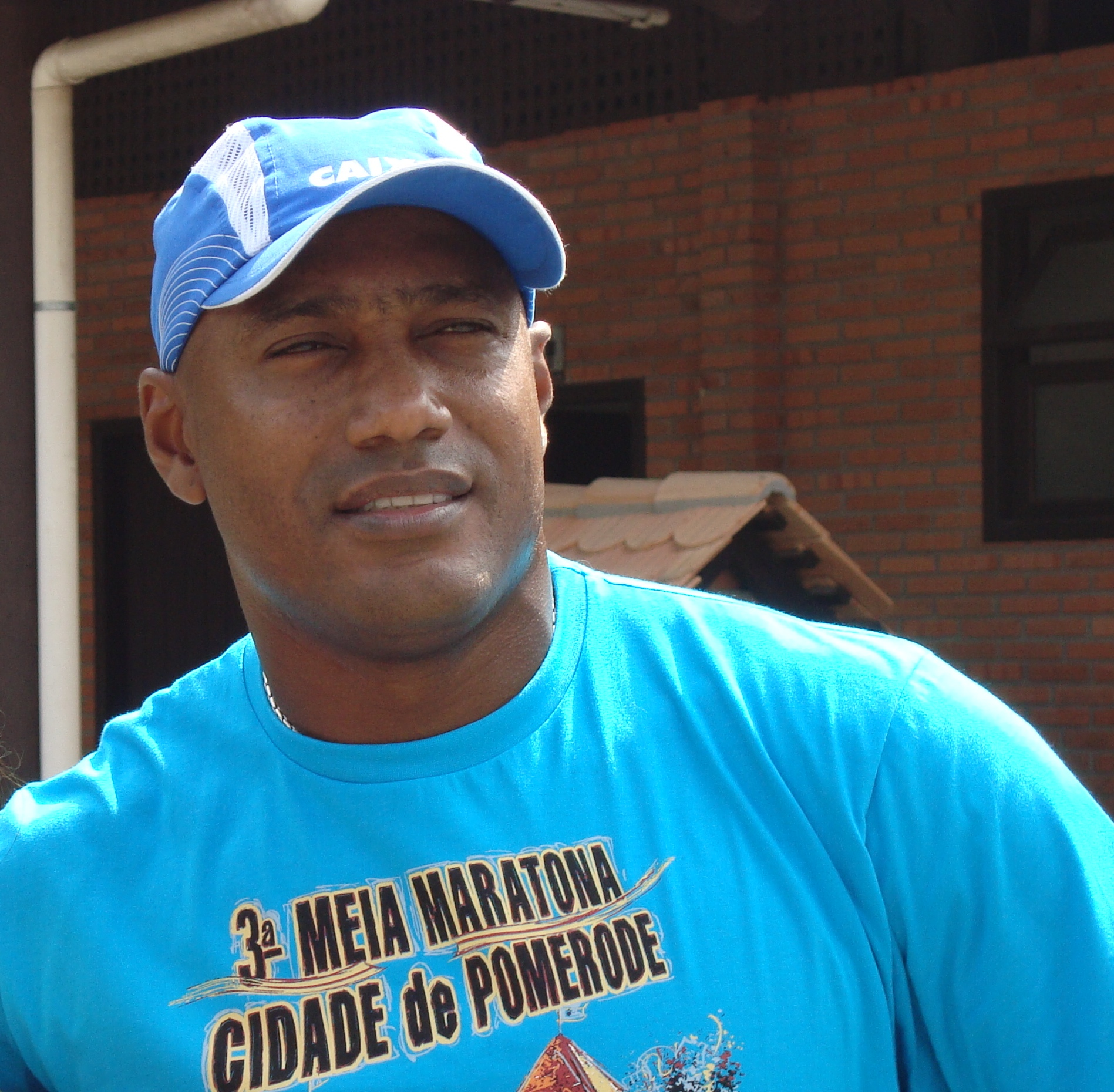
- Claudinei da Silva in 2010

Personal information
- Full name: Claudinei Quirino da Silva
- Born: November 19, 1970 (age 55) Lençóis Paulista, São Paulo
Medal record
Men's Athletics
Representing Brazil
Olympic Games
Silver medal – second place	2000 Sydney	4x100 m relay
World Championships
Silver medal – second place	1999 Sevilla	200 m
Bronze medal – third place	1997 Athens	200 m
Bronze medal – third place	1999 Sevilla	4x100 m relay
Pan American Games
Gold medal – first place	1999 Winnipeg	200 m
Gold medal – first place	1999 Winnipeg	4x100 m relay
Bronze medal – third place	1999 Winnipeg	100 m
South American Games
Silver medal – second place	1994 Valencia	100 m
Silver medal – second place	1994 Valencia	200 m

Claudinei Quirino da Silva (born November 19, 1970, in Lençóis Paulista) is a retired Brazilian sprinter who competed primarily in 200 metres.

== Career ==
He has been successful on regional and world level, and won a 2000 Olympic silver medal with the Brazilian 4 x 100 metres relay team.

In 1999 he ran the 200m dash in 19.89 seconds, the former South American record.

At the 1997 World Championships in Athletics in Athens, Claudinei Quirino won the bronze medal in the 200 meters, with a time of 20s26; in 1999 World Championships in Athletics, in Sevilla, Spain he won silver in the 200 meters, with 20 seconds and bronze in the 4 × 100 m.

At the 1999 Pan American Games in Winnipeg, he won gold in the 200 meters and 4 × 100 m relay. Still in 1999, he won gold in the final stage of the IAAF Grand Prix, in 1999, in Munich, Germany, in the 200 meters race, with a time of 19s89.

== Achievements ==
(200 metres unless noted)

- 2003 South American Championships - silver medal
- 2000 Olympic Games - silver medal (4x100 metres relay)
- 2000 Olympic Games - sixth place
- 1999 Pan American Games - gold medal (4x100 metres relay)
- 1999 Pan American Games - bronze medal (100 m)
- 1999 Pan American Games - gold medal
- 1999 World Championships - silver medal
- 1999 South American Championships - gold medal (4x100 metres relay)
- 1997 South American Championships - gold medal (4x100 metres relay)
- 1997 South American Championships - gold medal
- 1997 World Championships - bronze medal
- 1995 World Championships - fifth place
- 1995 South American Championships - silver medal

Sporting positions
Preceded by (Brazil) André da Silva	Brazil's National Champion 100 metres 1998 — 1999	Succeeded by (Brazil) Vicente de Lima
Preceded by (Brazil) Vicente de Lima	Brazil's National Champion 100 metres alongside Raphael de Oliveira; 2001	Succeeded by (Brazil) Vicente de Lima
