= Delano Meriwether =

American physician and former track & field athlete

- Born: April 23, 1943 (age 83); Nashville, Tennessee, U.S.
- Education: Michigan State University; Duke University; Johns Hopkins University
- Years active: 1967-present
- Known for: First African American to graduate from Duke Medical; Leukemia research; 1976 swine flu immunization program
- Medical career
- Profession: Physician
- Research: Hematology
- Sports career
- Sport: Running
- Events: 100 yards, 100 metres, 200 metres
Medal record
Representing United States
Athletics
Pan American Games
Bronze medal – third place	1971 Cali	100m

Wilhelm Delano Meriwether (born April 23, 1943) is an American physician and a former track and field athlete. He is best known for having been the head of the United States government immunization program during the 1976 swine flu outbreak and as the 1971 US outdoor track and field champion in the 100-yard dash.

== Early life ==
Meriwether was born in Nashville, Tennessee, United States to parents who were teachers. His father, Wilhelm R. Meriwether, in time became a principal of Burke High School in Charleston, South Carolina where the younger Meriwether was educated. At Burke he played saxophone on the school band and was a member of the Science Club. His sporting involvement at high school was limited as he was considered too small for basketball and football. Meriwether graduated from Burke in 1960.

While still at high school Meriwether worked in a veterinary hospital having already won an award from the American Veterinary Medical Association as a 16-year-old for research on internal parasites found in dogs. After graduating from high school he received a scholarship to study at Michigan State University; taking pre-veterinary studies for two years before switching to pre-medical. After three years he graduated from Michigan State and became the first African American to be accepted into Duke University School of Medicine, graduating with honors in 1967 and then obtained a Master of Public Health from Johns Hopkins University.

== Medicine ==
After graduating from Duke, Meriwether took his internship at the Penn State Milton S. Hershey Medical Center, before starting a residency at Ohio State University Medical Center. He later specialized in hematology, the study of blood, and had a number of papers published. In the early 1970s he worked researching Leukemia at the Baltimore Cancer Research Center, and was a 1973-1974 White House Fellow.

In 1976 Meriwether, as Special Assistant to the Assistant Secretary of Health, was appointed Director of the United States Public Health Service's National Influenza Immunization Program (NIIP). The NIIP sought to immunize over 200 million people against swine influenza within six months. This program faced much opposition as many doctors, pharmaceutical companies and insurance companies refused to take responsibility for mishaps. Meriwether became the public face of this campaign.

In 1983 he moved to Gazankulu in South Africa where he worked as a missionary doctor and was one of six physicians treating a half million people. He later worked and lived in the Soweto township.

Meriwether returned to the United States in 1990 working as an Emergency Room doctor.

== Athletics ==
Meriwether began competitive running in 1970 while working at the Baltimore Cancer Research Center. In order to train Meriwether would scale a fence at the nearby Johns Hopkins University athletics track and would run at night in the dark. Due to his relative inexperience and unique attire, Meriwether drew the attention of the news media; appearing on the cover of Sports Illustrated posing in his running gear, and also featured in Time.

Meriwether made his mark as a runner at the Amateur Athletic Union USA Outdoor Track and Field Championships in Eugene, Oregon in June 1971 when he won the 100-yard dash. His appearance at the event was unusual for a number of reasons. He was unattached to any educational institution and he was wearing a hospital shirt, gold and white suspenders and swimming trunks. The most remarkable element of the day was the time he recorded for the 100-yard dash. In recording a nine-second 100-yard he became the second runner to run the distance in nine seconds flat, the other being John Carlos, however Meriwether's time did not count as a record as the run was wind assisted.

In 1972 Meriwether was the United States Indoor Track and Field Champion, but due to a knee injury he was unable to compete for selection for the United States 1972 Olympic Games team. After another injury prevented his chances of being selected for the 1976 Olympics, he retired from regular competition to concentrate on medicine.

For a number of years he ran in masters events and his 200-meter run of 20.8 seconds in 1978 is still a current national record in the 35-39 age group.

== Personal life ==
Delano is married to Nomvimbi Meriwether, who runs a travel agency specializing in tours of Africa. Their daughter, Nana Meriwether (b. 1985) represented Maryland in the 2012 Miss USA Pageant and was named the New Miss USA 2012 on December 19, after current Miss USA Olivia Culpo became Miss Universe 2012.

== Popular culture ==
The novel Bethany Park, by Glen Sharp, tells the story of a boy inspired to run after reading of Dr Meriwether's athletic endeavors in Sports Illustrated.

Sporting positions
Preceded by Ivory Crockett	US 100 yard National Champion; 1971	Succeeded by Robert Taylor
Sporting positions
Preceded by Jean-Louis Ravelomanantsoa	US 60 yard National Champion; 1972	Succeeded by Hasely Crawford
