= João Jorge =

Brazilian footballer (born 1936)

Personal information
- Full name: João Jorge Constantino
- Date of birth: 28 June 1936 (age 90)
- Place of birth: São Paulo, Brazil
- Position: Forward

Senior career*
| Years | Team | Apps | (Gls) |
| 1960 | Palmeiras | | |
| 1961 | Montreal Concordia | | |
| 1962–1963 | Real Oviedo | 12 | (4) |
- * Club domestic league appearances and goals

João Jorge Constantino (born June 28, 1936) is a Brazilian former football player.

== Career ==
He played with Sociedade Esportiva Palmeiras. Jorge played abroad with Montreal Concordia in 1961 in a split season in the International Soccer League and National Soccer League. He assisted Montreal in securing the Dominion Cup after defeating the Vancouver Firefighters. The following season he played in La Liga with Real Oviedo.
