= Pedro Agostinho =

Portuguese sprinter (born 1965)

Personal information
- Nationality: Portuguese
- Born: 20 February 1965 (age 61) Portalegre, Portugal

Sport
- Sport: Sprinting
- Event: 100 metres

Pedro Emanuel Costa Agostinho (born 20 February 1965) is a Portuguese former sprinter.

He was four times 100 metres national champion.

He competed in the men's 100 metres and Men's 4 × 100 metres relay at the 1988 Summer Olympics and four years later in the Men's 4 × 100 metres relay at the 1992 Summer Olympics.

During the 1980s and 1990s he represented his country at many other international competitions, including the 1985 European Athletics Indoor Championships, 1986 European Athletics Championships, 1990 European Athletics Championships and 1992 Ibero-American Championships in Athletics.
