= Juliet Itoya =

Spanish long jumper (born 1986)

Personal information
- Nationality: Spanish
- Born: 17 August 1986 (age 39) Benin City, Nigeria
- Height: 1.74 m (5 ft 9 in)
- Weight: 63 kg (139 lb)

Sport
- Sport: Athletics
- Event: Long jump
- Club: A.D.Marathon
- Coached by: Juan Carlos Álvarez
Medal record
Women's Athletics
Representing Spain
Mediterranean Games
Silver medal – second place	Tarragona 2018	Long jump

Juliet Itoya (born 17 August 1986) is an athlete specialising in the long jump. Born in Nigeria, she represents Spain. She won the gold medal at the 2014 Ibero-American Championships.

Her personal bests in the event are 6.79 metres outdoors (+1.4 m/s, Salamanca 2016) and 6.47 metres indoors (Madrid 2016).

== International competitions ==
Year	Competition	Venue	Position	Event	Notes
Representing Spain
2007	European U23 Championships	Debrecen, Hungary	20th (q)	Long jump	5.86 m
2013	Mediterranean Games	Mersin, Turkey	5th	Long jump	6.23 m
2014	Ibero-American Championships	São Paulo, Brazil	1st	Long jump	6.64 m
2014	European Championships	Zurich, Switzerland	21st (q)	Long jump	6.20 m
2016	European Championships	Amsterdam, Netherlands	16th (q)	Long jump	6.35 m (w)
2016	Olympic Games	Rio de Janeiro, Brazil	22nd (q)	Long jump	6.35 m
2017	European Indoor Championships	Belgrade, Serbia	11th (q)	Long jump	6.36 m
2018	Mediterranean Games	Tarragona, Spain	2nd	Long jump	6.83 m (w)
2018	European Championships	Berlin, Germany	10th	Long jump	6.38 m
2018	Ibero-American Championships	Trujillo, Peru	1st	Long jump	6.73 m (w)
