= Marty Krulee =

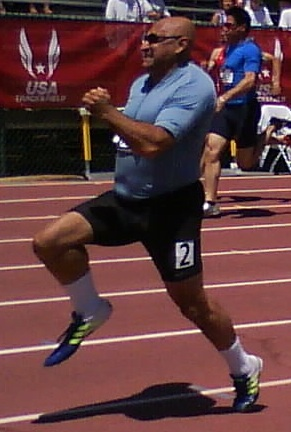
Marty Krulee at the 2010 USATF Masters Championships

Marty Krulee (born November 4, 1956), is an American "World Class" track and field athlete, primarily known for running sprint races. While never achieving outstanding results, he is best known for an extended career in International competition. While the 100 metres was his primary outdoor event, decades after his elite career he still ranks on the world list at 200 metres. Krulee ran extensively in Europe during the annual track circuit, achieving the Swedish national championship in the 100 metres three years in a row, when he was already in his 30s. He also won the 200 metres and indoor 60 metres twice each.

Krulee was born in Framingham, Massachusetts, but was brought up in San Jose, California, where he attended Branham High School and West Valley College in Saratoga, California. As a young athlete, he was constantly overshadowed by another contemporary area athlete, Millard Hampton who went on to win a Silver Medal in the 200 metres and Gold Medal in the 4x100 metre relay in the 1976 Summer Olympics. He barely made the varsity team as a sprinter his senior year of high school. Krulee went on to attend San Diego State University and competed with the track team as a walk-on. At that level, he was again overshadowed by future World Number One sprinter Clancy Edwards who competed for the nearby University of Southern California. He made the semi-finals in the 1978 NCAA Championships and the1980 United States Olympic Trials (track and field) against some of the top sprinters in the world. As frequently the only white American sprinter in a field, Krulee felt he "stood out like a sore thumb." In Europe, he found he could hold his own against the top international sprinters.

He split his time between the United States and living in Europe eventually applying for both Finnish and Swedish citizenship in order to have a chance to run in the Olympics and European Championships where he would face less competition from other American sprinters (because a single country is only allowed three entrants).

He's won multiple United States and World Masters Athletics Championships and has held the top rankings in the outdoor and indoor seasons of various such championships between 2006 and 2011
