= Matthew Coad (athlete) =

New Zealand sprinter

Personal information
- Born: 9 August 1975 (age 50) Auckland, New Zealand

Sport
- Country: New Zealand
- Sport: Sprinting
- Event: 200 metres

Matthew Coad (born 9 August 1975) is a New Zealand sprinter. He competed in the men's 200 metres at the 1996 Summer Olympics. Coad holds a 200m best of 20.61 (+1.8m/s), which is currently the fifth fastest 200m time in New Zealand history, as well as a 100m best of 10.44 (+0.9m/s).
