= Death of Daniel Monteiro =

Daniel Monteiro, a 71-year-old man, was found dead on 30 July 2015 in Païta, New Caledonia. He was reported missing two days earlier, and his vehicle and credit card had apparently been stolen. Prosecutors said he had been "savagely" beaten in a "wild way" to the point of unconsciousness, and then thrown into the Karikaté River, where he drowned. Two men were taken into custody in connection with the theft of his vehicle. A 21-year-old woman confessed to Monteiro's slaying on 3 August 2015, according to French chief prosecutor Claire Lanet.

The death of Monteiro was notable for igniting a silent protest by more than 3,000 people, who walked through the streets of Nouméa on 8 August in a demonstration against recent violence in New Caledonia. The protest was led by Jennifer Seagoe, president of the Chamber of Commerce, who presented a white paper proposing reforms to curb violent crime to French High Commissioner Vincent Bouvier.
