= Audun Garshol =

Norwegian sprinter (born 1951)

Personal information
- Nationality: Norwegian
- Citizenship: Norwegian
- Born: 9 November 1951 (age 74) Ulsteinvik

Sport
- Country: Norway
- Sport: Track and field
- Event(s): 100m, 200m
- Club: Hamar IL, IL i BUL, Oslo IL, Hareid IL
- Updated on 24 December 2014

Audun Egil Garshol (born 9 November 1951) is a Norwegian sprint runner. He was born in Ulsteinvik. He competed in 100 metres and 200 metres at the 1972 Summer Olympics in Munich, reaching the quarter finals in both events.

On August 12, 1972, in Stavanger, he set a Norwegian record with a time of 10.2 seconds, which was the country's last record before the introduction of electronic timing. On August 31, 1972, in Munich, he set the first Norwegian record after the introduction of the new measuring method with a time of 10.55 seconds. On September 19, 1973, in Sofia with a time of 10.52 seconds, he broke his own record. The result held the national record until May 20, 1986, when it was beaten by 0.01 seconds by Einar Sagli. One of his records, 10.49 s (Munich, August 31, 1972), was not recognized because it was set in too strong a wind.

He was awarded the Kongepokal trophy in 1972, for best male performance at the 1972 Norwegian Athletics Championships. He won a total of eight individual national titles between 1972 and 1976: five titles in 100 metres, and three in 200 metres.
