= 2003 Lithuanian Athletics Championships =

- Edition: 80th
- Dates: 1–2 August
- Host city: Kaunas, Lithuania
- Level: Senior
- Type: Outdoor

The 80th 2003 Lithuanian Athletics Championships were held in S. Darius and S. Girėnas Stadium, Kaunas on 1–2 August 2003.

== Men ==
Event	Gold		Silver		Bronze	
100 m	Andrius Kačėnas	10.78	Sigitas Kavaliauskas	10.83	Dainius Šerpytis	10.94
200 m	Raimondas Turla	21.14	Stanislav Michno	21.64	Vytautas Kancleris	21.68
400 m	Raimondas Turla	47.10	Mindaugas Butkus	48.06	Viktoras Mauricas	48.38
800 m	Mindaugas Norbutas	1:50.39	Andrius Masilionis	1:51.40	Evaldas Martinka	1:51.82
1500 m	Egidijus Rupšys	3:57.53	Mindaugas Pukštas	3:58.29	Karolis Levickis	3:59.49
5000 m	Linas Šalkauskas	15:18.71	Tomas Stasionis	15:20.67	Darius Gruzdys	15:25.65
10000 m	Tomas Venckūnas	30:50.88	Dainius Šaučikovas	31:20.53	Arūnas Balčiūnas	32:11.05
110 m hurdles	Vytautas Kancleris	14.29	Giedrius Mačėnas	14.70	Regimantas Kičas	15.29
400 m hurdles	Ridas Karaška	53.96	Andrius Krištopaitis	54.05	Donatas Verkys	55.38
3000 m st.	Karolis Levickis	9:20.92	Linas Šalkauskas	9:35.92	Tomas Ūksas	10:40.34
20 km walk	Linas Bubnelis	1:28:13	Marius Žiukas	1:30:29	Tadas Šuškevičius	1:31:01
High jump	Aurelijus Eirošius	2.12	Deividas Rinkevičius	2.05	Giedrius Petryla	2.05
Pole vault	Vytautas Žukaitis	4.10	Mindaugas Šerepka	4.00	Darius Laurinčikas	3.80
Long jump	Tomas Bardauskas	7.82	Povilas Mykolaitis	7.72	Vytautas Seliukas	7.52
Triple jump	Audrius Raizgys	15.53	Arinijus Veiknys	15.28	Mantas Dilys	15.18
Shot put	Tomas Keinys	16.64	Vytas Druktenis	15.50	Martynas Simanavičius	13.58
Discus throw	Virgilijus Alekna	67.71	Andrius Butrimas	52.28	Andrius Šipalis	45.60
Javelin throw	Arūnas Jurkšas	70.15	Tomas Intas	69.70	Tomas Paulavičius	61.58
Hammer throw	Žydrūnas Vasiliauskas	62.84	Edgaras Brinkis	60.11	Tomas Tarvydas	54.40
4 × 100 m	Kaunas	42.03	Klaipėda	42.31		
4 × 400 m	Šiauliai	3:22.90	Švenčionių r.	3:25.59	SC Piramidė	3:27.03

== Women ==
Event	Gold		Silver		Bronze	
100 m	Agnė Eggerth	11.37	Audra Dagelytė	11.90	Edita Lingytė	11.96
200 m	Edita Lingytė	24.82	Audra Dagelytė	24.85	Jolanta Kirejeva	25.61
400 m	Kristina Osipova	55.52	Jūratė Kudirkaitė	56.31	Danguolė Razmaitė	57.28
800 m	Rasa Drazdauskaitė	2:05.09	Irina Krakoviak	2:07.51	Jūratė Kudirkaitė	2:12.59
1500 m	Aina Valatkevičiūtė	4:49.05	Gytė Norgilienė	4:50.29	Olga Ziuganova	4:50.72
5000 m	Inga Juodeškienė	16:46.45	Laima Šerelytė	18:31.68	Sonata Ramoškevičiūtė	18:48.80
100 m hurdles	Viktorija Žemaitytė	14.73	Rita Grunskytė	15.35	Enrika Baliutavičiūtė	15.35
400 m hurdles	Kristina Osipova	1:03.15	Giedrė Kazlauskaitė	1:05.91	Rasa Luneckaitė	1:06.73
2000 m st.	Odeta Šidlauskaitė	7:09.54	Edita Gontytė	7:31.58	Ieva Bičkutė	7:50.63
20 km walk	Kristina Saltanovič	1:31:09	Laura Sukockytė	1:43:39	Neringa Aidietytė	1:46:37
High jump	Viktorija Žemaitytė	1.80	Jolanta Kviatkovskaja	1.77	Deimantė Meiliūnaitė	1.68
Pole vault	Edita Grigelionytė	3.50	Aušra Vinslovaitė; Kristina Sabaitytė	2.60		
Long jump	Živilė Šikšnelytė	6.21	Gerda Penkauskaitė	5.53	Rasa Mačiunskaitė	5.47
Triple jump	Živilė Pukštienė	12.78	Živilė Šikšnelytė	12.51	Raimonda Rimkutė	12.36
Shot put	Rasa Austytė	14.89	Agnė Pacevičiūtė	12.77	Inga Štaraitytė	12.71
Discus throw	Zinaida Sendriūtė	47.00	Viktorija Potapova	46.20	Raminta Sakalauskaitė	43.50
Javelin throw	Rita Ramanauskaitė	56.04	Inga Stasiulionytė	53.32	Indrė Jakubaitytė	49.61
Hammer throw	Lina Kraskauskaitė	48.49	Rasa Austytė	47.31	Laimutė Venclovaitė	44.00
4 × 100 m	Kaunas	46.94	Vilnius	48.38	Akmenės r.	48.63
4 × 400 m	Šiauliai	4:13.80				
