= List of news media phone hacking scandal victims =

This is a partial, alphabetical list of actual victims whose confidential information was reportedly targeted or actually acquired, in conjunction with the news media phone hacking scandal. Dates in parentheses, when included, indicate the approximate time frame during which information was acquired. The reference citations, in many cases, indicate who accessed the individual's information.

The precise number of victims is unknown, but a Commons Home Affairs Select Committee report noted in July 2011 that "as many as 12,800 people may have been victims or affected by phone hacking."

In 2003, a raid by the Information Commissioner's Office (ICO) was made as part of Operation Motorman on the home of private investigator Steve Whittamore. This resulted in seizure of records, including more than 13,000 requests for confidential information from newspapers and magazines. In 2006, Information Commissioner Richard Thomas "revealed that hundreds of journalists may have illegally bought private information.

In 2006, the Metropolitan Police Service (Scotland Yard) seized records from another private investigator, Glenn Mulcaire, and found a target list with over 4,000 names on it. Release of "the totality of the Mulcaire information" has not yet been achieved, but has been requested through the courts. Accordingly, "the seized material included 4,332 names or partial names; 2,987 mobile phone numbers; 30 audiotapes of varying length; and 91 pin codes of a kind needed to access voicemail with the minority of targets who change the factory settings on their mobile phones."

In contrast, John Yates told the House of Commons Culture, Media and Sport Committee in September 2009 that the police had only found evidence indicating that "it is very few, it is a handful" of persons that had been subject to message interception.

In January 2011, claims made in the suit filed by Kelly Hoppen suggest illegally accessing voicemail occurred as recently as March 2010. Jade Goody believed she and her mother were being hacked as recently as August 2008.

As of June 2011, according to The Guardian, "Scotland Yard is believed to have collected hundreds of thousands of documents during a series of investigations into private investigator Jonathan Rees. Rick Davies, reporter for The Guardian, believes these "boxloads" of paperwork "could include explosive new evidence of illegal news-gathering by the News of the World and other papers." According to his sources, confidential information sold to newspapers may have been obtained through blagging, burglaries, bribery, and blackmail, sometimes involving corrupt customs officers, VAT inspectors, bank employees and police officers.

In July 2011, it was estimated that only 170 people had so far been informed out of the up to 12,800 people that may have been affected by the illegal acquisition of confidential information . In October 2011, it was estimated that only 5%, or about 200, of people whose confidential information had been acquired by Glenn Mulcaire had been notified.

At News Corporation's annual meeting on 21 October 2011, a shareholder asked how the board was conducting its inquiry into the "thousands" of people whose phones were hacked by News of the World journalists. Chairman Rupert Murdoch responded, "It’s not thousands. I’ve not heard that figure before."

On 3 November 2011, Metropolitan Police, referring to the complete list of full names whose phones were possibly hacked by Glenn Mulcaire for News of the World, said "the current number of identifiable persons who appear in the material, and are thus victims, where names are noted, is 5,795. This figure is very likely to be revised in the future as a result of further analysis." As of 23 July 2012, the Met had identified 4,775 potential victims of phone hacking, of which 2,615 have been notified and 702 people are likely to have been victims.

As of 31 August 2012, the Met had identified 4,744 victims of phone hacking by News of the World whose names and phone numbers had been found in evidence. Of the victims, 658 had been contacted, but 388 were not contactable and police chose not to contact another 23 "for operational reasons". Of the victims, 1,894 had been contacted but 1,781 were not contactable.

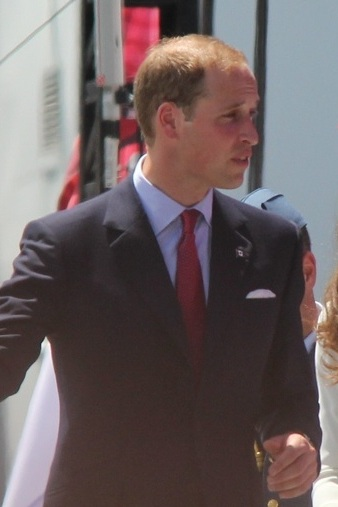
The broad public became aware of phone hacking in 2006 when police determined that Prince William's phone messages had been intercepted to write stories for News of the World.

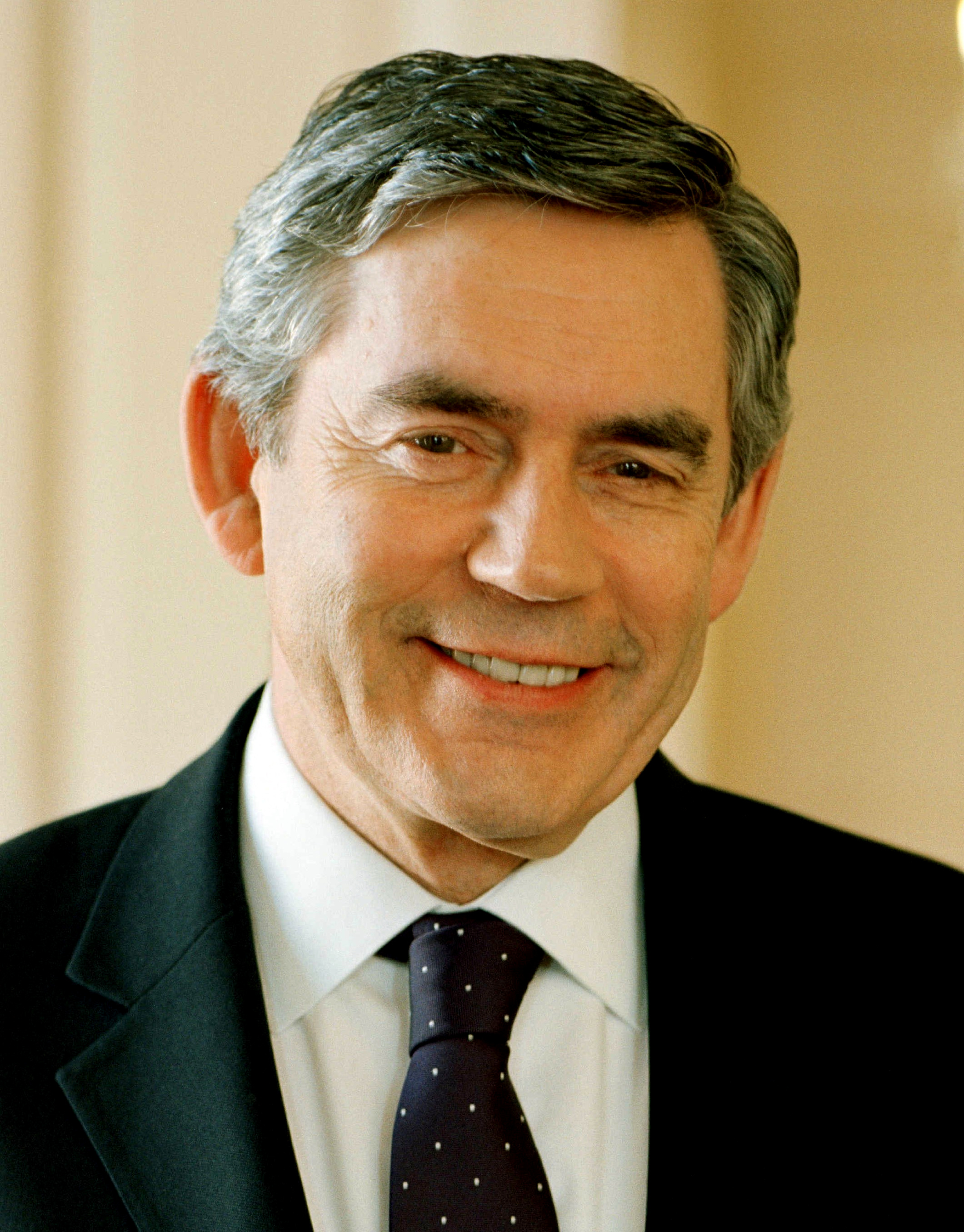
Former prime minister Gordon Brown alleged his bank records and family medical records were illegally obtained. He commented that "the family has been shocked by the level of criminality and the unethical means by which personal details have been obtained."

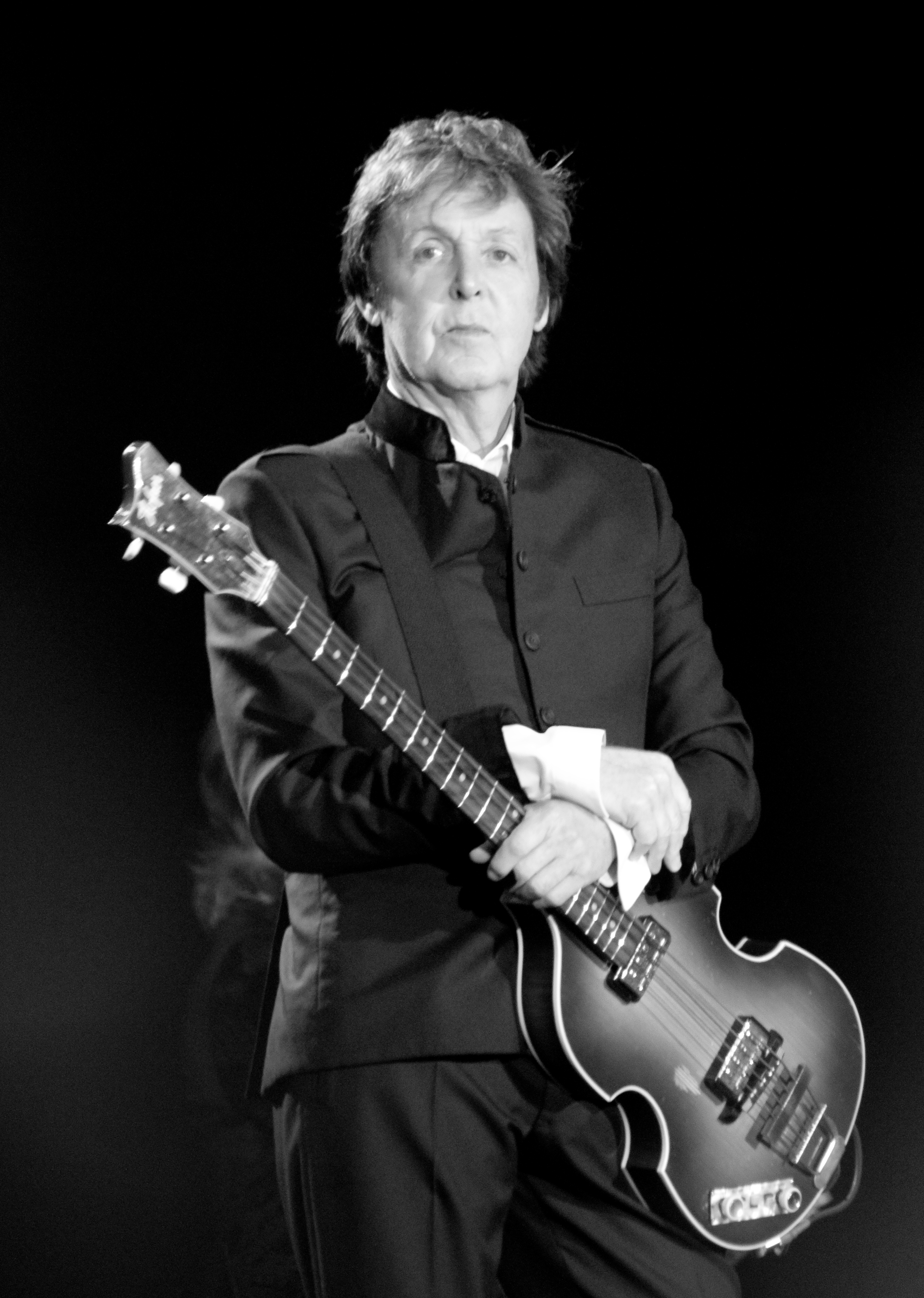
Phone messages between Paul McCartney and his then girl friend Heather Mills may have been intercepted by the Daily Mirror in 2001.

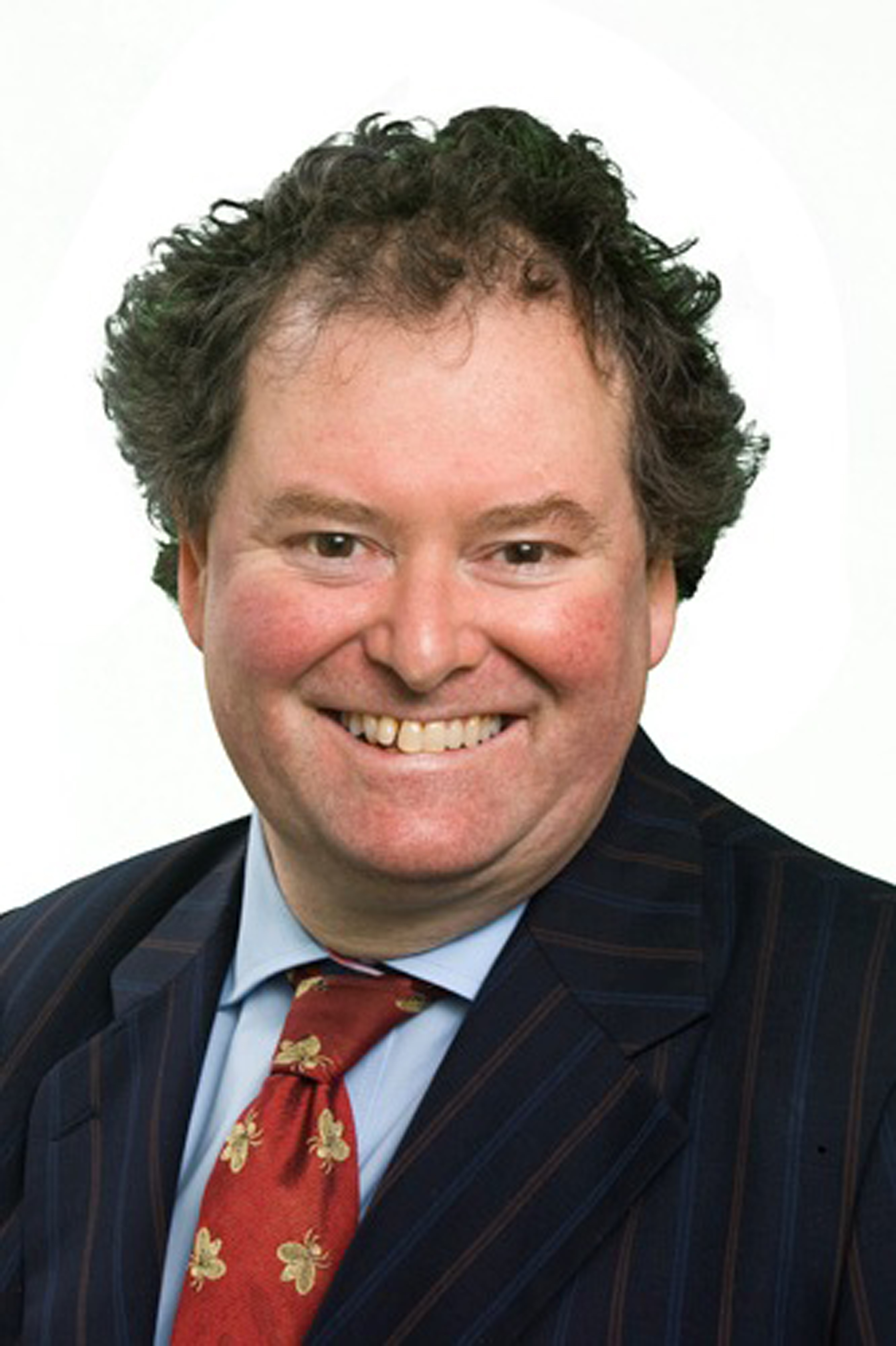
Solicitor Mark Stephens, who had represented James Hewitt during allegations of his affair with Diana, Princess of Wales and Julian Assange, founder of Wikileaks, had his phone hacked to obtain confidential information about his high-profile clients.

1. Adams, Tony; former England footballer
2. Alam, Faria; football association secretary
3. Anderson, John; father of Sally King
4. Andrew, Sky; football agent
5. Archer, Jeffrey; author, politician, convicted perjuror exposed by News of the World.
6. Armstrong, Jo; legal adviser to Professional Footballers' Association
7. Ash, Leslie and son; actress
8. Asprey, Helen; (1 November 2005 to 9 August 2006) aide to Prince Charles
9. Badger, Ruth; businesswoman and contestant on The Apprentice.
10. Barker, Linda; interior designer and television presenter.
11. Beckham, David and Beckham, Victoria; celebrity couple
12. Bell, Stuart; publicist to Sir Paul McCartney
13. Best, Calum fashion model, TV personality, son of George Best.
14. Betts, Clive; Labour Member of Parliament
15. Blackmore, Tony IIes; uncle of Nadine Milroy Sloan, the woman who falsely accused former Tory MP Neil Hamilton and his wife of sexual assault.
16. Blackmore, Gillian; wife of Tony Lles Blackmore.
17. Blair, Cherie; British barrister married to former Prime Minister Tony Blair
18. Blair, Ian; Metropolitan Police Commissioner
19. Blair, Tony; former Prime Minister of the United Kingdom
20. Blake, John; publisher and former journalist, many of whose books were serialised by News International titles
21. Blunkett, David; politician, Home Secretary
22. Boffey, Daniel; journalist for The Observer.
23. Brash, Lisa; former girlfriend of Robbie Williams.
24. Brimelow, Kirsty; prominent criminal barrister who has acted in rape and murder trials.
25. Bourret, Caprice; model
26. Brooks, Charlie; (late 1990s) EastEnders actor
27. Brown, Gordon; Prime Minister
28. Bryant, Chris; Labour Member of Parliament
29. Burke, James; model.
30. Burrell, Paul; former footman for the Queen and later butler to Diana, Princess of Wales
31. Campbell, Alastair; former press secretary to Tony Blair
32. Campbell, Sol; footballer
33. Caplin, Carole; (2002) style adviser to Cherie Blair and a fitness adviser to Tony Blair
34. Chapman, Lee; footballer
35. Christie, Linford; Olympic athlete
36. Church, Charlotte; singer-songwriter, actress and television presenter.
37. Clapton, Eric; singer
38. Clarke, Charles; Labor MP, home secretary and education secretary to Tony Blair
39. Clifford, Max; publicist
40. Cole Ashley; footballer
41. Colvin, Anne; witness at Tommy Sheridan's libel trial
42. Connery, Sir Sean; actor
43. Coogan, Steven; comedian, actor, writer and producer
44. Cook, David; Metropolitan Police detective chief superintendent
45. Cox, Peter; author, literary agent
46. Crisan, Cornelia; singer
47. Crow, Bob; (late 1990s) General Secretary, Rail Maritime & Transport Union
48. Dadge, Paul; (2005) man whose photograph helping 7/7 victims was widely circulated
49. Davis, David; politician, shadow Home Secretary
50. Davis, Steve; snooker player
51. Dearlove, Sir Richard; forensic psychologist working with criminals, and the then head of MI6.
52. Dell'Olio, Nancy; property lawyer and girlfriend of England football manager Sven-Göran Eriksson;
53. Dowler, Milly; (March 2002) murdered teenager
54. Edwards, Alan; founder of the Outside Organization that represented Sir Paul McCartney
55. Elliot, Jennifer; daughter of the actor Denholm Elliott
56. Eriksson, Sven-Göran; England football manager
57. Fallon, Kieren; jockey;
58. Families of 9/11 victims; (2001)
59. Families of 7/7 victims; (2005)
60. Families of UK Soldiers killed in Iraq and Afghanistan
61. Family and Friends of Charlotte Coleman; actress
62. Family of Madeleine McCann; (May 2007) missing child
63. Family of Jean Charles de Menezes; innocent Brazilian man mistakenly killed by police as a terror suspect
64. Family of Robert Kilroy-Silk;
65. Family of Soham Children; two 10-year-old Soham girls, Jessica Chapman and Holly Wells, who were abducted and murdered by Ian Huntley on 4 August 2002.
66. Family of Peter Sutcliffe, the serial killer
67. Feltz, Vanessa; TV and radio presenter
68. Ferguson, Sir Alex; Manchester United football manager
69. Ferraina, Elisa; died in the attack on New York's World Trade Center on 11 September 2001.
70. Field, Mary Ellen; former business manager to Elle Macpherson. Dismissed by Macpherson, who thought Field was providing confidential information to the press and publicly criticized her. Field was reportedly making $250,000 annually before being dismissed and was unable to reestablish her earnings. Glenn Mulcaire later admitted hacking Macpherson's phone.
71. Finnigan, Judy; TV presenter
72. Frost, Sadie; actress and designer, ex-wife of Jude Law
73. Galloway, George; Respect politician
74. Gascoigne, Paul; footballer;
75. George, Eddie; Governor of the Bank of England;
76. Gilchrist, Andy; (2003-2003) union leader; voicemail allegedly accessed by agents of The Sun
77. Goody, Jade and her mother, Jackiey Budden; (August 2008) celebrity who may have been hacked in August 2008, while she was dying of cancer.
78. Grant, Hugh; actor and film producer
79. Gray, Andy; footballer and broadcaster
80. Giggs, Ryan footballer
81. Hames, Jacqui; TV presenter
82. Hammell, Joan; aide to the Deputy Prime Minister John Prescott
83. Harrison, George' Beatle for whom the Mirror Group tried but apparently failed to obtain ex-directory numbers.
84. Haverson, Paddy; (1 November 2005 to 9 August 2006) communication secretary to Prince Charles
85. Henry, Lenny; actor, writer, comedian
86. Henry, Sheila; mother of 7/7 victim Christian Small
87. Henson, Gavin; rugby player
88. Hicks, Lady Pamela; daughter of Lord Mountbatten
89. Hislop, Ian; journalist, editor of Private Eye magazine whose phone records were reportedly purchased from hackers by newspaper photographer Jason Fraser.
90. Hoddle, Glenn; former England football manager
91. Hoppen, Kelly; (between June 2009 and March 2010) interior designer and Sienna Miller's stepmother
92. Horton, Richard; (May 2009) police constable and the anonymous author of the "Nightjack" blog that described a constable's life. He was publicly identified by The Times, reportedly as a result of computer hacking, leading to termination of the blog and to his receiving a reprimand by his police superiors.
93. Hughes, Simon; politician
94. Hurley, Elizabeth; model and actress
95. Huthart, Eunice; winning contestant on "Gladiators", stunt double for Angelina Jolie
96. Hurst, Ian; (2006) British intelligence officer, handler for agent "Stakeknife"; personal computer allegedly hacked with Trojan programme which copied emails and relayed them to the hacker, putting at risk two agents who informed on the Provisional IRA and who may have been high-risk targets for assassination. Hurst was one of the few people who knew where they were.
97. Imbert, Lord; former commissioner of the Metropolitan police and a former special branch detective who investigated terrorist groups, making him a potential terrorist target. His home address and ex-directory phone number were acquired by deception from British Telecom.
98. Jackson, Ben; personal assistant for Jude Law
99. Jagger, Mick; singer
100. Jackson, Ben; personal assistant to Jude Law
101. Jefferies, Christopher; the former landlord of Joanna Yates at one time suspected in her murder and who successfully sued eight newspapers for defamation in connection with articles relating to his arrest
102. Johansson, Scarlett; actress, singer; pictures of herself taken by herself may have removed from her mobile phone without her consent and posted online. The FBI is investigating.
103. Johnson, Boris; London mayor
104. Jones, Dave; football manager, a Fleet Street reporter bought his home address and ex-directory number.
105. Jolie, Angelina; actress, wife of Brad Pitt
106. Jonsson, Ulrika; TV presenter
107. Jowell, Tessa; Member of Parliament and Culture Secretary, estranged wife to David Mills;
108. Katona, Kerry TV personality and former Atomic Kitten singer
109. Kaufman, Gerald; senior Labour politician
110. Kensit, Patsy; actress, singer, model
111. Keswick, Archie; friend of Sienna Miller
112. King, Mervyn; Governor of the Bank of England;
113. King, Anderw; husband of Sally King
114. King, Sally; estate agent and friend of David Blunkett
115. Khan, Jemima; (2006) writer, associate editor of The Independent
116. Kirkham, Susan;
117. Knatchbull, Norton; grandson of Lord Mountbatten
118. Law, Jude; actor, film producer and director, ex-husband of Sadie Frost and former partner of Sienna Miller
119. Lawrence, Frances wife of Philip Lawrence, who was stabbed to death at the school where he was headmaster in 1995
120. Lawson, Nigella; journalist and broadcaster
121. Lewis, Mark; solicitor representing as many as 70 alleged victims of phone hacking. He may also have been "put under surveillance by a private investigator acting for the News of the World"
122. Leslie, John; TV presenter
123. Lineker, Gary; footballer, TV presenter
124. Lowther-Pinkerton, Jamie; (1 November 2005 to 9 August 2006) private secretary to Princes William and Harry
125. Lumley, Joanna; Actress, author. "In one 18-month period, News International paid a total of £1,726...apparently for printouts of phone numbers she had been dialing."
126. Madeley, Richard; TV presenter
127. Mandelson, Peter and brother Miles Mandelson; politician
128. Mansfield, Michael; barrister representing the Fayed family at Diana, Princess of Wales's inquest
129. Macpherson, Elle; model
130. MacShane, Denis; politician
131. McAlpine, Joan; Scottish National party MSP and aide to Alex Salmond
132. McCoist, Ally; football club manager, reportedly one of a dozen Scottish public figure targeted for hacking by News of the World
133. McConnell, Jack and his two adult children Scottish politician, former Labor politician, peer in House of Lords; now Baron McConnell of Glenscorrodale, First Minister of Scotland from 2001 to 2007.
134. McDonagh, Siobhain; (2010) Member of Parliament since 1997.
135. McGuire, Fiona; acquaintance of Tommy Sheridan
136. McFadden, Brian; formerly of boyband Westlife and former husband of Atomic Kitten singer Kerry Katona.
137. McGuire, Mick; former deputy chief executive of the Professional Footballers' Association
138. McLean-Daily, Niomi Arleen aka Ms Dynamite; A newspaper "commissioned three illegal searches of the Police National Computer at £500 a time, looking for any sign of a criminal record for Ms Dynamite, her boyfriend or her manager."
139. Mellor, David; politician
140. Michael, George; singer
141. Middleton, Kate; then girlfriend to Prince William
142. Miller, Sienna; actress, model, fashion designer, former partner of Jude Law
143. Mills, David; lawyer and Tessa Jowell's estranged husband
144. Mills, Heather; (2001) then girlfriend of singer Sir Paul McCartney
145. Minogue, Dannii; singer, actress, television personality
146. Mitchell, Clarence; spokesman for Madeleine McCann's family
147. Montague, Brendon; freelance journalist
148. Neil, Andrew; BBC presenter and former editor of The Sunday Times
149. Nesbitt, James; actor
150. Noakes, Benedict Grant; television producer, close friend of Sir Paul McCartney and Heather Mills
151. Oaten, Mark; former Liberal Democrat politician
152. O'Grady, Paul; presenter and comedian
153. Opik, Lembit; Liberal Democrat politician
154. Osborne, George; politician
155. Paddick, Brian; senior officer, Metropolitan Police
156. Paltrow, Gwyneth; actress and singer
157. Parkes, Ciara; Sienna Miller's publicist
158. Pawlby, Hannah; special adviser to Charles Clarke
159. Payne, Sarah; (2000) media campaigner and mother of daughter Sarah Payne murdered by pedophile
160. Pelly, Guy; London nightclub owner and a confidant of the Princes William and Harry
161. Phillips, Nicola; assistant to Max Clifford
162. Pitt, Brad; actor, husband of Angelina Jolie
163. Prescott, John; Member of Parliament, deputy prime minister under Tony Blair
164. Prince Charles and Camilla, Duchess of Cornwall
165. Prince Edward, Duke of Kent and Katharine, Duchess of Kent
166. Prince Edward and Sophie, Countess of Wessex and aides; (1 November 2005 to 9 August 2006)
167. Prince Harry
168. Prince William and aides; (1 November 2005 to 9 August 2006) members of the royal family and household
169. Quinn, Kimberley; Spectator magazine publisher and friend of David Blunkett
170. Rebh, George and Richard; owners of FLOORgraphics; company computer allegedly hacked
171. Regan, Gaynor; the second wife of Foreign Secretary Robin Cook
172. Robinson, Anne; journalist and television presenter
173. Rooney, Laura; may have been targeted simply due to her last name being the same as Wayne Rooney
174. Rooney, Wayne; footballer
175. Ross, Jonathan; TV and radio presenter
176. Rowe, Natalie; (2005) dominatrix
177. Rowland, Tom; freelance journalist
178. Rowling, JK; author
179. Schmidt, Jade; nanny for the children of Jude Law and Sadie Frost
180. Schofield, Alan; press aide to John Prescott
181. Russell, Shaun; (1996) father of Josie Russell, who survived a murder attempt.
182. Shear, Graham; partner at Berwin Leighton Paisner (BLP), solicitor for Mary Ellen Field and Ashley Cole
183. Shearer, Alan: footballer, football manager, TV pundit
184. Sheridan, Alice; mother to Tommy Sheridan
185. Sheridan, Tommy; Scottish politician
186. Shipman, Christopher
187. Smith, Joan; author, journalist, human rights activist
188. Silcott, Winston; jailed for the murder of PC Keith Blakelock during the 1985 Tottenham riot and later released
189. Small, Christian; 7/7 victim
190. Smith, Delia; celebrity chef, TV presenter and joint majority shareholder of Norwich City FC with husband Michael Winn-Jones
191. Snowdon, Lisa; fashion model, television personality and presenter
192. Stagg, Colin; accused in Rachel Nickell murder
193. Stevens, John; Metropolitan Police Commissioner
194. Stephens, Mark; solicitor, whose clients have included James Hewitt, Sven-Göran Eriksson; John Leslie; Sara Payne; Jemima Khan; Kerry Katona; Cornelia Crisan; David Beckham; Shaun Russell and Julian Assange, and is acting in several phone-hacking cases.
195. Stirling, Angus; former director general of the National Trust
196. Storie, Valerie;, gunshot victim who nearly died in the 1961 crime for which James Hanratty was hanged
197. Straw, Jack; politician
198. Tarrant, Chris; TV Presenter
199. Taylor, Gordon; of Professional Footballers' Association;
200. Temple, Tracy; former secretary to John Prescott; affair with Prescott reported by Daily Mirror in 2006.
201. Tierney, Patricia; grandmother linked to Wayne Rooney
202. Titmuss, Abi; model and TV presenter
203. Tomlinson, Clifton; (late 1990s) son of the actor Ricky Tomlinson
204. Tulloch, John; professor, survivor of the 7/7 London bombings in 2006
205. Wallace, Jessie; (late 1990s) EastEnders actor
206. Williams, Zoe;
207. Windsor, Lord Frederick; son of Prince and Princess Michael of Kent
208. Winskell, Robin; sports lawyer who has acted for footballers in disciplinary trials, Fifa arbitrations, and libel cases.
209. Witness to the murder of Jill Dando; illegal privacy violation had the potential for interfering with a live police inquiry
210. Woodhead, Chris; then head of the Office for Standards in Education (OFSTED)
211. Wynn-Jones, Michael; writer, publisher, former editor of Sainsbury's magazine, joint majority shareholder of Norwich City FC with his wife, Delia Smith
212. Yates, John; (1990s-) Assistant Commissioner in the London Metropolitan Police Service
