= List of highways numbered 24 Business =

Route 24 Business or Highway 24 Business may refer to:

- Interstate 24 Business
- U.S. Route 24 Business
- Georgia State Route 24 Business
- Maine State Route 24 Business
- M-24 Business (Michigan highway)
- North Carolina Highway 24 Business

== See also ==
- List of highways numbered 24
- List of highways numbered 24A
