= Hate mail =

Threatening comments sent to a person

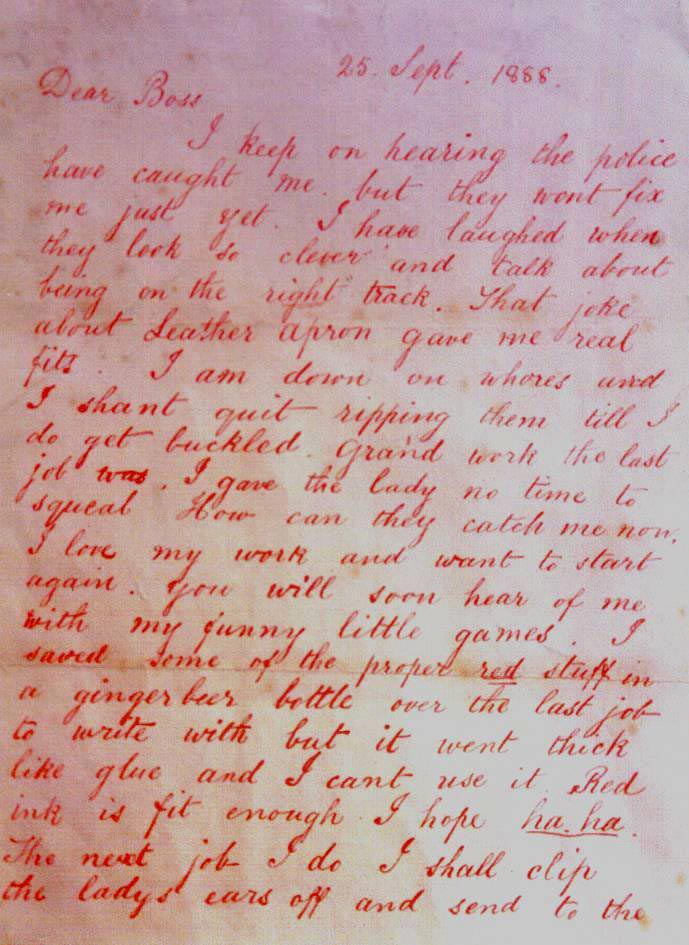
The first page of the "Dear Boss" letter, dated 25 September 1888

Hate mail (as electronic, posted, or otherwise) is a form of harassment, usually consisting of invective and potentially intimidating or threatening comments towards the recipient. Hate mail often contains exceptionally abusive, foul or otherwise hurtful language.

The recipient may receive disparaging remarks concerning their ethnicity, gender, religion, intelligence, political ideology, sense of ethics, or sense of aesthetics. The text of hate mail often contains profanity, or it may simply contain a negative message.

Senders of hate mail normally send anonymous letters or pose as someone else (either a different or fictitious individual) in order to avoid being identified.

== Notable examples of hate mail ==
Zodiac Killer's letter sent to the San Francisco Chronicle on July 31, 1969

Hate mail has frequently been issued to footballers and managers by fans of rival football teams, and also by their own fans who are dissatisfied with the performance of an individual player, manager or the team. Neil Lennon, the former Celtic F.C. manager, received hate mail including a package containing a nail bomb from Rangers fans. Two men were jailed for five years in April 2012 for sending a nail bomb to Lennon.

The parents of 10-year-old Holly Wells, a Cambridgeshire girl who was murdered along with her friend Jessica Chapman in the highly-publicised Soham murders in August 2002, received several letters shortly after their daughter's body was found, accusing them both of being involved in the murder of the two girls. They also received several letters with content including that they "got what they deserved" for allowing their daughter to play out on the Sabbath. Other letters with sexual content referring to the possible circumstances of her death were also written.

The parents of Sarah Payne, who was murdered in West Sussex in July 2000, received an anonymous letter while she was still missing, accusing her father and grandfather of having murdered her. After Sarah's body was found, her parents also received letters berating them for allowing Sarah and her three siblings to play unsupervised on a beach. Her mother, Sara Payne, now a child protection campaigner, closed her Twitter social networking account in November 2014 following a long campaign of abuse by trolls, which included allegations that she had made a vast amount of money from her media work and was "glorying in a lavish lifestyle" as a result, suggestions that Roy Whiting (convicted of Sarah's murder) was innocent, threatening messages from Twitter users claiming to be paedophiles, and remarks about the death of her former husband Michael from an alcoholism related illness the previous month.

== See also ==
- Death threat
- Flaming
- Hate crime
- Hate speech
- Obscene phone call
- Poison pen letter
- Fan mail
