= Linford Christie =

Jamaican-born British sprinter (born 1960)

Linford Christie OBE
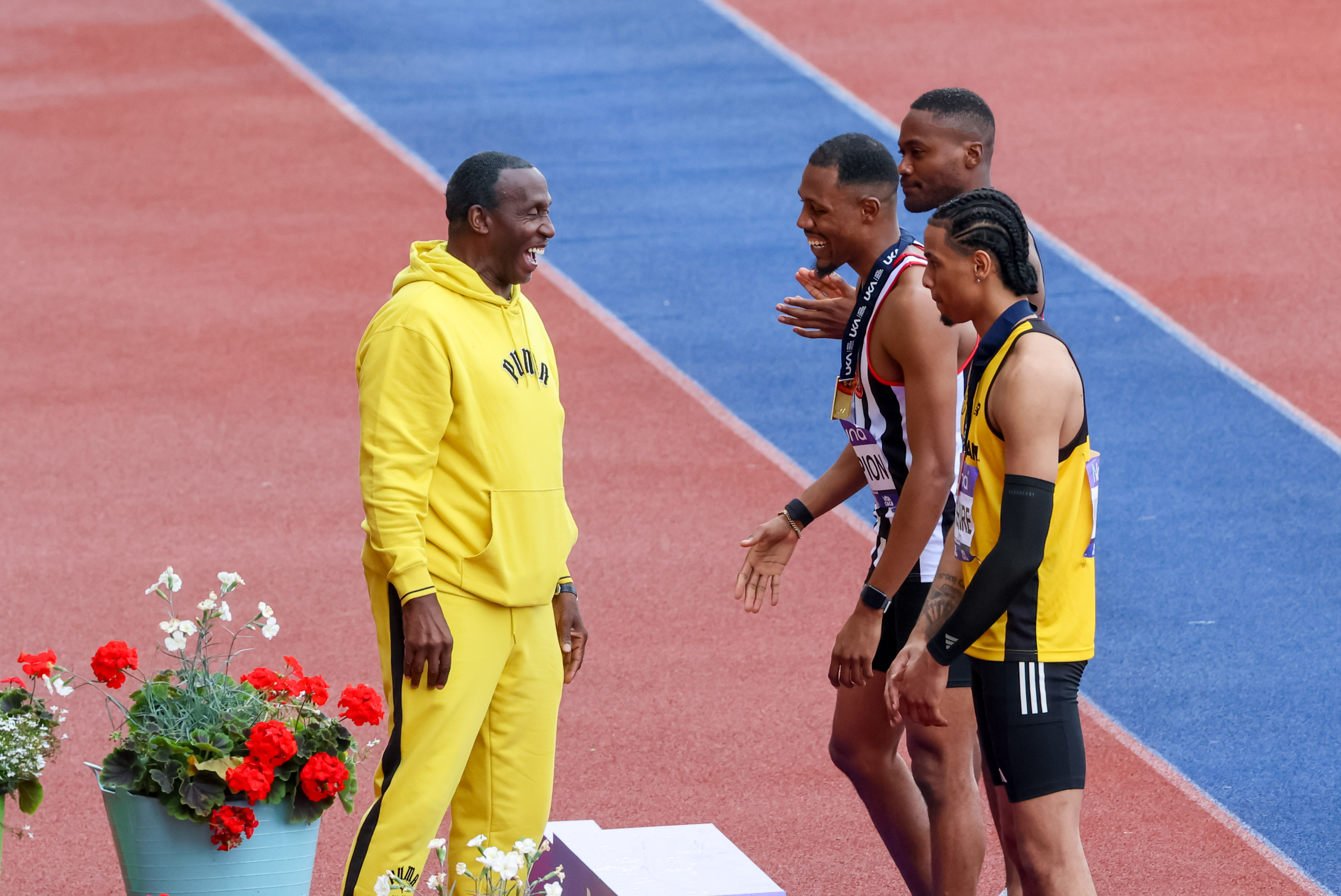
- Christie (left) presenting awards in 2025 at the UK Athletics Championship

Personal information
- Nationality: British
- Born: 2 April 1960 (age 66) Saint Andrew, Jamaica
- Height: 6 ft 2 in (188 cm)
Medal record
Men's athletics
Representing Great Britain
Event	1st	2nd	3rd
Olympic Games	1	2	0
World Championships	1	1	2
World Indoor Championships	0	2	0
European Championships	3	1	2
European Indoor Championships	3	0	1
Commonwealth Games	3	2	0
Total	11	8	5
Olympic Games
Gold medal – first place	1992 Barcelona	100 m
Silver medal – second place	1988 Seoul	100 m
Silver medal – second place	1988 Seoul	4 × 100 m relay
World Championships
Gold medal – first place	1993 Stuttgart	100 m
Silver medal – second place	1993 Stuttgart	4 × 100 m relay
Bronze medal – third place	1987 Rome	100 m
Bronze medal – third place	1991 Tokyo	4 × 100 m relay
World Indoor Championships
Silver medal – second place	1991 Seville	60 m
Silver medal – second place	1991 Seville	200 m
European Championships
Gold medal – first place	1986 Stuttgart	100 m
Gold medal – first place	1990 Split	100 m
Gold medal – first place	1994 Helsinki	100 m
Silver medal – second place	1990 Split	4 × 100 m relay
Bronze medal – third place	1990 Split	200 m
Bronze medal – third place	1986 Stuttgart	4 × 100 m relay
European Indoor Championships
Gold medal – first place	1986 Madrid	200 m
Gold medal – first place	1988 Budapest	60 m
Gold medal – first place	1990 Glasgow	60 m
Bronze medal – third place	1988 Budapest	200 m
Representing England
Commonwealth Games
Gold medal – first place	1990 Auckland	100 m
Gold medal – first place	1990 Auckland	4 × 100 m relay
Gold medal – first place	1994 Victoria	100 m
Silver medal – second place	1986 Edinburgh	100 m
Silver medal – second place	1986 Edinburgh	4 × 100 m relay
- Updated on 20 July 2012

Linford Christie (born 2 April 1960) is a Jamaican-born British former sprinter and athletics coach. He is the only British man to have won gold medals in the 100 metres at all four major competitions open to British athletes: the Olympic Games, the World Championships, the European Championships and the Commonwealth Games. He was the first European athlete to break the 10-second barrier in the 100 m and held the British record in the event for close to 30 years. He is a former world indoor record holder over 200 metres, and a former European record holder in the 60 metres, 100 m and 4 × 100 metres relay.

He remains one of the most highly decorated British athletes of all time. By the end of his track career Christie had won 24 medals overall, more than any other British male athlete before or since. In 1993 he was awarded the BBC Sports Personality of the Year.

Christie tested positive for a banned stimulant in 1988 during the Seoul Olympics. In 1999 he was suspended for two years by the IAAF after the banned substance nandrolone was found in a test, although he had been effectively in retirement since 1997.

As a coach, two of his charges, Darren Campbell and Katharine Merry, went on to win Olympic and World medals.

== Early life and education ==
Christie was born on 2 April 1960 in Saint Andrew, Jamaica, where he was brought up by his maternal grandmother. At the age of seven he joined his parents, who had emigrated to Acton, London, England, five years before. He was educated at Henry Compton Secondary School in Fulham, London and excelled in physical education. He competed in the very first London Youth Games in 1977 for the borough of Hammersmith & Fulham. He also joined the Air Training Corps in 1978, 336 (Hammersmith) Squadron. He did not take up athletics seriously until he was 18.

== Professional athletics career ==
Christie's early track career was not particularly promising. A comparatively slow starter, he failed to make the Great Britain team for the 1984 Summer Olympics, not even being included in the sprint relay squad. It was not until some years after he had begun to work in earnest on his running technique under the coaching guidance of Ron Roddan in 1979 that he fulfilled his potential.

In 1986, he was the surprise winner of the 100 m at the European Championships and finished second in the same event at the Commonwealth Games in Edinburgh, behind Ben Johnson. At the 1987 World Championships in Athletics in Rome, Christie came fourth in the 100 m, but was later awarded the bronze medal, when winner Johnson was disqualified after admitting years of steroid use.

At the 1988 Summer Olympics in Seoul, Christie won the 100 m silver behind Carl Lewis after Johnson, who set a world record in 9.79 seconds, was again disqualified following a positive drug test. Christie's time was 9.97 seconds, a new European record by 0.03 seconds and this was only the third time that an athlete had broken the ten second barrier in the 100 metres without winning the race.

In 1992, Christie became the third British athlete to win the Olympic 100 m, after Harold Abrahams and Allan Wells, winning the title ahead of Frankie Fredericks of Namibia at the Barcelona Olympic Games. In the absence of his great rival Lewis, Christie ran 9.96 s in the final, and at the age of 32 years 121 days became the oldest Olympic 100 m champion by four years and 38 days.

In 1993, he became the first man in history to hold the Olympic, World, European and Commonwealth titles in the 100 m as he was victorious at the Stuttgart World Championships in his fastest ever time of 9.87. The time stood as the British record until 2023. His achievement saw him being voted BBC Sports Personality of the Year by the British public that year.

The following year, in 1994, he defended his Commonwealth title in Victoria in his second fastest ever 100 m time of 9.91.

Defending his Olympic title in 1996, Christie was disqualified in the final after two false starts. He said: "The first one I knew I did, but on the second one I felt I reacted perfectly to the gun. I have never been disqualified from a race before in my life. What a place to do it." His reaction time was 0.086 seconds. Under IAAF rules, sprinters are not allowed to start from their blocks faster than 0.1 seconds.

Christie retired from representative international competition in 1997, although he continued to make appearances at invitation meetings.

=== Doping allegations and ban ===
==== Early allegations ====
Christie faced an International Olympic Committee disciplinary hearing at the 1988 Seoul Olympics because of an adverse drug test for the banned stimulant pseudoephedrine after he ran in the heats of the 200 m. He escaped sanction after the committee voted by a margin of 11 to 10 and gave Christie "the benefit of the doubt." Christie argued that he had taken it inadvertently when drinking some ginseng tea.

At the 1994 European championships staged in Helsinki, where British team captain Christie won his third European 100 m title, he was caught up in a doping controversy after Solomon Wariso, a 400 m runner making his international championship debut, tested positive for the stimulant ephedrine. Wariso revealed that he had used an over-the-counter pick-you-up called "Up Your Gas", which Christie had bought at a Florida pharmacy.

In 1998, less than six months before his first positive drug test, Christie won a libel action against the journalist John McVicar. McVicar had insinuated in a satirical magazine that Christie's remarkable rise from 156th in the world to triumph at an age when he should have been in decline could only have been achieved through performance-enhancing drugs. The jury found in Christie's favour by a 10–2 majority. The judge ordered that McVicar should be bound by an injunction restraining him from accusing Christie of taking banned substances. The modest £40,000 damages awarded were outweighed by the legal costs that Christie incurred to bring the case. After the judgment, McVicar called Christie "The Judy Garland of the 100 metres", referring to the emotion that Christie had displayed before the court.

==== Positive drugs test and ban from athletics ====
In February 1999, Christie competed in an indoor meet in Dortmund, Germany. A routine in-competition drug test found the banned substance nandrolone. After a six-month delay, a disciplinary hearing was convened by the British Athletic Federation which found Christie to be not guilty. But the IAAF overruled and confirmed a two-year suspension. He was found to have more than 100 times threshold levels of the metabolites of nandrolone in his urine. Various explanations were offered to explain the result. "You think that's an awful lot," says Professor Ron Maughan one of the UK Athletics anti-doping panellists who worked on Christie's case, "but the amounts are so small, they would have absolutely no physiological effect, but they would trigger a doping test.". The IAAF rejected the explanations and gave Christie a two-years ban from athletics, despite UK Athletics feeling that there was reasonable doubt whether the drug had been taken deliberately, a decision which ignored the usual drug testing principle of "strict liability".

Several alternative theories have been proposed that might explain Christie's positive test. Nandrolone is a long-acting anabolic steroid, and is well known in athlete circles to be detectable in blood and urine screenings for long periods; ranging from 6 to 18 months. Sceptics of Christie's positive, and other nandrolone sanctions in the late 1990s, have cited this detection window as a major deterrent to using the drug at any point during training or competition periods. Around this time pro-hormones like 19-norandrostenedione, Androstenedione, and 1-Testosterone, among others, abounded in the American supplement market, and were not yet codified as 'anabolic agents' under the Federal Controlled Substances Act.

Christie has always denied any wrongdoing. "If I took drugs there had to be a reason to take drugs. I had pretty much retired from the sport." Furthermore, he denied that his physique was gained through drug use and promoted an anti-steroid approach: "It does not follow that all athletes who are big take drugs ... Only by testing all athletes will the sport be kept clean of drugs."

==== Fallout following positive drugs test ====
Following his positive drugs test and ban from athletics, Christie was banned for life from the British Olympic Association, who announced that Christie would not be accredited for any future Olympic Games, in accordance with their regulations.

== Retirement ==
Following the two-year ban, Christie worked as a presenter on the BBC programmes Record Breakers and Garden Invaders, and also had a contract with BBC Sport. He has spent less time as a public figure and has devoted most of his time to managing his company. In 1990 he made his acting debut in the BBC programme Grange Hill. Later he appeared in another BBC programme Hustle. In 2010, Christie appeared on the UK ITV television channel's I'm a Celebrity... Get Me Out of Here! show, subsequently becoming the sixth person to be eliminated, on 30 November 2010.

During the McVicar case, Christie raised another of his grievances with the media – insinuating comments about the figure-hugging running suits that Christie wore in his races. The term Linford's lunchbox had been coined by The Sun newspaper in reference to the noticeable bulge of Christie's genitalia in his Lycra shorts. He said "Linford's lunchbox is one of my grievances with the media. I don't like it ... Nobody ever goes on about Sally Gunnell's breasts ... I think it is disgusting, I don't like it at all." In court, the judge Mr Justice Popplewell, amused some by tactlessly asking Christie to explain the phrase, asking "What is 'Linford's lunchbox?'" Christie's anger at this unwanted attention led to his "newspaper print" running suit, although he has deliberately drawn attention to his body on occasions: he has remarked that "A lot of people have looked at my physique and two things can come into their mind – admiration and envy." He also appeared shirtless and flexing his muscles on the BBC youth series Reportage in 1988. In the 21st century, Christie appears to have come to terms with the "lunchbox" label, disclosing his preference for briefs rather than boxer shorts, and in 2002 becoming the "face" of Sloggi, the men's underwear brand, posing for advertising wearing only underwear.

In the successful British bid for the 2012 Olympic Games, Christie was absent from the team, even though he has stated that he attempted to get involved. Christie has cited an ongoing feud between himself and former teammate Sebastian Coe, who led the bid committee, as a likely reason for the snub. Commenting on the argument, Christie's teammate, Derek Redmond, said he was "a well-balanced athlete; he has a chip on both shoulders."

However, in April 2006, it was announced that Christie would be a senior mentor for athletes on the national team, along with former athletes Steve Backley, Daley Thompson and Katharine Merry. This proved controversial, however, due to Christie's 2 year drugs ban in February 1997. "I don't think he should be in that mentor role," said Paula Radcliffe, the former women's marathon world record-holder. "We have to make sure that the people in that mentor role have an integrity and strong sense of ethics and morals."

The BOA confirmed that their ban on Olympic accreditation for Christie remained in place. Christie claimed that he was invited by London Mayor Ken Livingstone to be one of the carriers of the 2008 Olympic Torch on its journey through London, although Livingstone denied that he had invited Christie to undertake that role. The IOC reacted angrily to any suggestion that "an athlete who has an Olympic ban" could have been invited to carry the Olympic torch.

In 2011, Christie was convicted of careless driving, after his vehicle crashed head-on into a taxi on 8 May 2010 due to driving on the wrong side of the A413 road in Chalfont St Peter, Buckinghamshire. Four people, including a newly-wed couple, were hurt.

In November 2023, he appeared in The Masked Singer: I'm a Celebrity Special as Huntsman. He was voted off first.

A documentary film about his life, titled Linford, premiered on BBC One in July 2024.

== Achievements and legacy ==
Reflecting upon his track career, he stated: "I will have no complaints if people remember me as one of the best athletes in the world." He was the British record-holder for nearly 30 years at 100 m, with the 9.87 s he ran at the 1993 World Championships. He was the third Briton, after Harold Abrahams and Allan Wells, and the fifth European to win the 100 m at the Olympic Games, and the last to do so until 2021, when Italian Marcell Jacobs took the Olympic title in Tokyo in the delayed 2020 Summer Olympics. He remains the oldest male athlete to win the 100 metres at the Olympics at the age of 32.

As of 2019, Christie's British record of 9.87 seconds in the 100 metres makes him the third fastest European in history; after Francis Obikwelu's 9.86 s personal best which broke Christie's European record, and the same time achieved by French sprinter Jimmy Vicaut. His 100 m personal best fares favourably in comparison with his contemporaries: Carl Lewis and Frankie Fredericks managed 9.86 s while Leroy Burrell ran 9.85 s. Christie broke the ten-second barrier nine times, and was the first European to break the ten-second barrier. In the 1988 100 metres Olympic final, he became the first man to break the ten-second barrier and not win the race. In the 1991 World Championships 100 m final, he became the first man to break the ten-second barrier and come fourth, running 9.92 seconds.

In the 4 × 100 m relay event Christie's performance as anchor, alongside Colin Jackson, Tony Jarrett and John Regis, set a European record of 37.77 s at the 1993 World Championships. This was beaten six years later by a 37.73 s run by a British team, which included his protégé Darren Campbell. However, Christie's team's performance is still the second fastest 4 × 100 m performance by a European team and one of the best by a non-United States relay team.

Over 60 m, Christie set a European record of 6.47 s in 1995 which was beaten by fellow Briton Jason Gardener in 1999 with 6.46 s. Christie has the fourth fastest time over the distance for a European after Gardener, Ronald Pognon and the current European record holder Dwain Chambers.

Christie also holds 3 current 35–39 masters age group world records. On 23 September 1995, Christie set a M35 world record of 9.97 in the 100 m which no longer stands. On 25 June 1995 he set the current M35 world record in the 200 m in 20.11 seconds and on 3 January 1997 Christie set the current indoor record in the M35 60 m in a time of 6.51 seconds.

Christie broke the world indoor record over 200 m with 20.25 s at Liévin in 1995, and remains the seventh fastest sprinter on the all-time list.

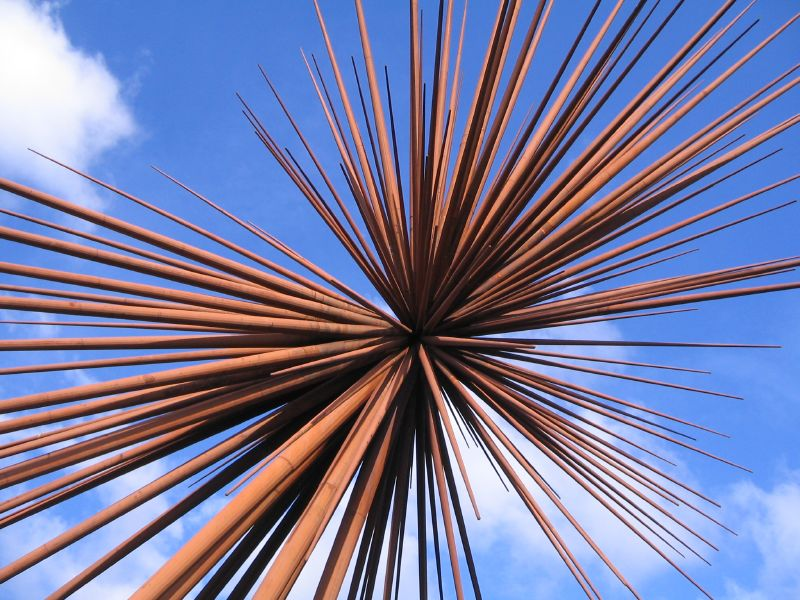
B of the Bang: a sculpture named after a Christie quotation

He was appointed MBE in 1990 and OBE in 1998. In 1993, the West London Stadium, where he spent much time training, was renamed the Linford Christie Stadium in his honour. Christie's claim that he started races on the "B of the Bang" inspired a large public sculpture of the same name. Erected as a celebration of the 2002 Commonwealth Games in Manchester, it was officially unveiled by Christie in 2004. Owing to safety concerns, it was dismantled in 2009. In 2010, he was inducted into the England Athletics Hall of Fame, and in 2009, he was inducted into the London Youth Games Hall of Fame.

== Statistics ==
=== Personal bests ===
Event	Time (seconds)	Date	Venue	Notes
60 metres	6.47	19 February 1995	Liévin, France	
100 metres	9.87	15 August 1993	Stuttgart, Germany	NR
150 metres	14.97	4 September 1994	Sheffield, United Kingdom	
200 metres	20.09	28 September 1988	Seoul, South Korea	
300 metres	33.80	21 June 1988	Oslo, Norway	
400 metres	47.75	1991	?	
Long jump	6.67 m	21 August 1996	London, United Kingdom	

- All information taken from IAAF and UK Athletics profiles.

=== Seasonal bests ===
View source data.
View source data.
View source data.
- All information taken from IAAF and UK Athletics profiles.

=== International competitions ===
Year	Competition	Venue	Position	Event	Result
1985	European Indoor Championships	Athens, Greece	2nd (h1)	200 m	21.50
1986	European Indoor Championships	Madrid, Spain	1st	200 m	21.10
1986	Commonwealth Games	Edinburgh, United Kingdom	2nd	100 m	10.28
1986	Commonwealth Games	Edinburgh, United Kingdom	—	200 m	DNS
1986	European Championships	Stuttgart, Germany	1st	100 m	10.15
1986	European Championships	Stuttgart, Germany	5th (sf2)	200 m	20.69
1986	European Championships	Stuttgart, Germany	3rd	4 × 100 m relay	38.71
1987	European Cup	Prague, Czechoslovakia	1st	100 m	10.23
1987	European Cup	Prague, Czechoslovakia	1st	200 m	20.63
1987	World Championships	Rome, Italy	3rd	100 m	10.14
1987	World Championships	Rome, Italy	—	200 m	DNS
1988	European Indoor Championships	Budapest, Hungary	1st	60 m	6.57
1988	European Indoor Championships	Budapest, Hungary	3rd	200 m	20.83
1988	Olympic Games	Seoul, South Korea	2nd	100 m	9.97 AR
1988	Olympic Games	Seoul, South Korea	4th	200 m	20.09 NR
1988	Olympic Games	Seoul, South Korea	2nd	4 × 100 m relay	38.28
1989	European Cup	Gateshead, United Kingdom	1st	100 m	10.33
1989	European Cup	Gateshead, United Kingdom	1st	4 × 100 m relay	38.39
1989	World Cup	Barcelona, Spain	1st	100 m	10.10
1989	World Cup	Barcelona, Spain	2nd	4 × 100 m relay	38.34
1990	Commonwealth Games	Auckland, New Zealand	1st	100 m	9.93
1990	Commonwealth Games	Auckland, New Zealand	1st	4 × 100 m relay	38.67
1990	European Indoor Championships	Glasgow, United Kingdom	1st	60 m	6.56
1990	European Championships	Split, Yugoslavia	1st	100 m	10.00
1990	European Championships	Split, Yugoslavia	3rd	200 m	20.33
1990	European Championships	Split, Yugoslavia	2nd	4 × 100 m relay	37.98 NR
1991	World Indoor Championships	Seville, Spain	2nd	60 m	6.55
1991	World Indoor Championships	Seville, Spain	2nd	200 m	20.72
1991	European Cup	Frankfurt, Germany	1st	100 m	10.18
1991	World Championships	Tokyo, Japan	4th	100 m	9.92 AR
1991	World Championships	Tokyo, Japan	6th (sf1)	200 m	20.62
1991	World Championships	Tokyo, Japan	3rd	4 × 100 m relay	38.09
1992	Olympic Games	Barcelona, Spain	1st	100 m	9.96
1992	Olympic Games	Barcelona, Spain	5th (sf1)	200 m	20.38
1992	Olympic Games	Barcelona, Spain	4th	4 × 100 m relay	38.08
1992	World Cup	Havana, Cuba	1st	100 m	10.21
1992	World Cup	Havana, Cuba	2nd	200 m	20.72
1993	European Cup	Rome, Italy	1st	100 m	10.22
1993	European Cup	Rome, Italy	1st	4 × 100 m relay	38.53
1993	World Championships	Stuttgart, Germany	1st	100 m	9.87 NR
1993	World Championships	Stuttgart, Germany	—	200 m	DNS
1993	World Championships	Stuttgart, Germany	2nd	4 × 100 m relay	37.77 NR
1994	European Cup	Birmingham, United Kingdom	1st	100 m	10.21
1994	European Cup	Birmingham, United Kingdom	1st	200 m	20.67
1994	European Cup	Birmingham, United Kingdom	1st	4 × 100 m relay	38.72
1994	European Championships	Helsinki, Finland	1st	100 m	10.14
1994	European Championships	Helsinki, Finland	—	4 × 100 m relay	DNF
1994	Commonwealth Games	Victoria, Canada	1st	100 m	9.91 GR
1994	World Cup	London, United Kingdom	1st	100 m	10.21
1994	World Cup	London, United Kingdom	1st	4 × 100 m relay	38.46
1995	European Cup	Villeneuve-d'Ascq, France	1st	100 m	10.05 CR
1995	European Cup	Villeneuve-d'Ascq, France	1st	200 m	20.11 CR
1995	European Cup	Villeneuve-d'Ascq, France	1st	4 × 100 m relay	38.73
1995	World Championships	Gothenburg, Sweden	6th	100 m	10.12
1996	European Cup	Madrid, Spain	1st	100 m	10.04 CR
1996	European Cup	Madrid, Spain	1st	200 m	20.25 w
1996	European Cup	Madrid, Spain	3rd	4 × 100 m relay	38.67
1996	Olympic Games	Atlanta, United States	—	100 m	DQ
1996	Olympic Games	Atlanta, United States	4th (qf5)	200 m	20.59
1997	European Cup	Munich, Germany	1st	100 m	10.04
1997	European Cup	Munich, Germany	1st	200 m	20.56

- All information taken from IAAF and UK Athletics profiles.

=== National titles ===
Christie competed during the era of dual national championships, whereby the winner at the nominally open AAA Championships was often recognised as the national champion, but a separate UK only event, the UK Athletics Championships, was also held, crowning a UK Athletics champion. Between both events, Christie accumulated 19 outdoor championship golds. Eleven of these golds were in the AAA championships which were broadly recognised as the more prestigious of the national titles.

- UK Athletics Championships
  - 100 metres: 1985, 1987, 1990, 1991, 1992, 1993
  - 200 metres: 1985 (shared with John Regis), 1988
- AAA Championships
  - 100 metres: 1985, 1986, 1988, 1989, 1990†, 1991, 1992, 1993, 1994, 1996
  - 200 metres: 1988
- AAA Indoor Championships
  - 60 metres: 1989, 1990, 1991
  - 200 metres: 1981, 1982, 1985†, 1987, 1988, 1989, 1991
- † Christie was the top Briton behind Mel Lattany at the 1985 AAA Indoor 200 m
- †† Christie was the top Briton behind Calvin Smith at the 1990 AAA 100 m

=== Circuit wins ===
- All information taken from IAAF and UK Athletics profiles.

100 metres

- Gateshead: 1985, 1991, 1993, 1994, 1996
- Meeting de Atletismo Madrid: 1986
- Prague: 1987
- Budapest: 1987
- Birmingham: 1987, 1988, 1989, 1991, 1992
- London: 1987, 1988, 1989, 1990, 1993, 1996
- Meeting Nikaïa: 1988
- Sheffield: 1991, 1993
- Notturna di Milano: 1992
- Cena Slovenska - Slovak Gold: 1992
- Golden Gala: 1992, 1993, 1997
- Bislett Games: 1992, 1993, 1995
- ISTAF Berlin: 1992
- Memorial Van Damme: 1993, 1994, 1995
- Gran Premio Diputación: 1994
- Live Nuremberg: 1994
- Weltklasse Zürich: 1994, 1995
- Toto International Super Meeting: 1994, 1995
- Perth Track Classic: 1995, 1996
- Meeting Lille-Métropole: 1995
- Rieti Meeting: 1995
- Melbourne Track Classic: 1997
- Adriaan Paulen Memorial: 1997

200 metres

- Gateshead: 1987, 1990
- Prague: 1987
- Birmingham: 1987, 1988, 1989
- Bislett Games: 1987
- Athens IAAF Indoor Meeting: 1987
- Indoor Flanders Meeting: 1988, 1991, 1994
- Cosford Indoor Games: 1988, 1989
- Sparkassen Cup: 1989, 1997
- London: 1991
- Weltklasse in Köln: 1993
- Meeting Pas de Calais: 1995
- Meeting Lille-Métropole: 1995

60 metres

- Glasgow International Match: 1988, 1991, 1994, 1995
- Cosford Indoor Games: 1989, 1990
- Sparkassen Cup: 1989, 1997
- Athens IAAF Indoor Meeting: 1989
- Indoor Flanders Meeting: 1991, 1994
- Sindelfingen Leichtathletik Grand Prix: 1992, 1994, 1995, 1997
- Birmingham Indoor Grand Prix: 1992, 1994
- Memorial José María Cagigal: 1994
- Gunma International: 1995
- Meeting Pas de Calais: 1995

== Awards ==
- European Athlete of the Year trophy: 1993
- BBC Sports Personality of the Year Award: 1993

== Personal life ==
Linford Christie has eight children. His niece Rachel Christie was crowned Miss England in 2009 though later relinquished the title following allegations of assault. His godson Omari Patrick is a professional footballer.

In 1993 Christie formed a sports management and promotions company, Nuff Respect, with sprint-hurdler Colin Jackson. One of their early products was a sports training and workout video, The S Plan: Get Fit with Christie and Jackson. Jackson was later to leave the enterprise, saying "Linford has to be in control, he has to be number one, he has to be the leader."

== See also ==
- List of men's Olympic and World Championship athletics sprint champions
- List of 1988 Summer Olympics medal winners
- List of 1992 Summer Olympics medal winners
- List of Olympic medalists in athletics (men)
- List of World Athletics Championships medalists (men)
- List of IAAF World Indoor Championships medalists (men)
- List of Commonwealth Games medallists in athletics (men)
- List of European Athletics Championships medalists (men)
- List of European Athletics Indoor Championships medalists (men)
- List of 100 metres national champions (men)
- List of 200 metres national champions (men)
- 100 metres at the Olympics
- 4 × 100 metres relay at the Olympics
- 100 metres at the World Championships in Athletics
- 4 × 100 metres relay at the World Championships in Athletics
- Great Britain and Northern Ireland at the World Athletics Championships
- List of world records in athletics
- List of world records in masters athletics
- List of European records in masters athletics
- List of doping cases in athletics
- List of masters athletes
- List of sports announcers
- List of RAF Cadets
- List of news media phone hacking scandal victims
- List of Oxford Street Christmas lights celebrities
- List of I'm a Celebrity...Get Me Out of Here! contestants (UK)
- List of Jamaican British people
- British African-Caribbean people

== Notes ==
Awards and achievements
Preceded by Nigel Mansell	BBC Sports Personality of the Year; 1993	Succeeded by Damon Hill
Sporting positions
Preceded by None	Men's European Athlete of the Year; 1993	Succeeded by Colin Jackson
Records
Preceded by Marian Woronin	European Record Holder Men's 100 m 24 September 1988 – 22 August 2004	Succeeded by Francis Obikwelu
