= N24 =

N24, N-24 or N.24, may refer to:

== Media ==
- N24 (Germany), now Welt, a German television channel
- E24 Näringsliv, formerly N24, a Swedish online business newspaper
- E24 Næringsliv, formerly N24, a Norwegian online business newspaper
- Național 24 Plus, a Romanian television channel

== Other uses ==
- N24 (Long Island bus), a bus route
- Aston Martin Vantage N24, a British race car
- GAF N24 Nomad, an Australian utility aircraft
- HMS Thistle (N24)
- Nieuport 24, a French First World War fighter aircraft
- Nitrogen-24, an isotope of nitrogen
- Non-24-hour sleep–wake disorder
- Nürburgring 24 Hours

== See also ==
- List of N24 roads
