= Sparkassen Cup =

Sparkassen Cup may refer to:

- Sparkassen Cup (figure skating), figure skating competition now known as the Bofrost Cup on Ice
- Sparkassen Cup (tennis)
- Sparkassen Cup (athletics)
