= Roddan =

Roddan is a surname. Notable people with the surname include:

- Craig Roddan (born 1993), British footballer
- Ron Roddan, British sprinter and athletic coach
