= List of highways numbered 24 =

Route 24, or Highway 24, can refer to:

== International ==
- E24 European route E24

== Australia ==
- Lyell Highway (Tasmania)
- Central Arnhem Road, NT

== Austria ==
- Verbindungsspange Rothneusiedel

== Bolivia ==
- National Route 24 (Bolivia)

== Canada ==
- Alberta Highway 24
- British Columbia Highway 24
- Manitoba Highway 24
- Ontario Highway 24
- Prince Edward Island Route 24
- Saskatchewan Highway 24

== Cuba ==
- Highway 6–24

== Czech Republic ==
- part of I/24 Highway; Czech: Silnice I/24

== Greece ==
- A24 motorway, a short spur of the A2 around Efkarpia
- A24 road, a limited-access road from Efkarpia towards Kassandreia
- EO24 road, from Corfu to Palaiokastritsa

== India ==
- National Highway 24 (India)

== Iran ==
- Road 24
- Freeway 24

== Ireland ==
- N24 road (Ireland)

== Italy ==
- Autostrada A24

== Japan ==
- Japan National Route 24
- Keinawa Expressway

== Korea, South ==
- National Route 24

== Malaysia ==
- FT 24 Malaysia Federal Route 24
- Tun Salahuddin Bridge

== New Zealand ==
- New Zealand State Highway 24

== United Kingdom ==
- British A24 (Worthing-London)

== United States ==
- Interstate 24
  - Interstate 24W (former proposal)
- U.S. Route 24
- New England Interstate Route 24 (former)
- Alabama State Route 24
  - County Route 24 (Lee County, Alabama)
- Arizona State Route 24
- Arkansas Highway 24
- California State Route 24
  - County Route A24 (California)
  - County Route J24 (California)
  - County Route S24 (California)
- Delaware Route 24
- Florida State Road 24
  - County Road 24 (Levy County, Florida)
    - County Road 24B (Levy County, Florida)
- Georgia State Route 24
- Idaho State Highway 24
- Illinois Route 24 (former)
- Iowa Highway 24
- Kentucky Route 24 (former)
- Louisiana Highway 24
- Maine State Route 24
- Maryland Route 24
  - Maryland Route 24D
  - Maryland Route 24E
  - Maryland Route 24F
- Massachusetts Route 24
- M-24 (Michigan highway)
- Minnesota State Highway 24
  - County Road 24 (Goodhue County, Minnesota)
- Mississippi Highway 24
- Missouri Route 24 (1922) (former)
- Montana Highway 24
- Nebraska Highway 24
  - Nebraska Link 24B
  - Nebraska Link 24D
  - Nebraska Spur 24C
- Nevada State Route 24 (former)
- New Jersey Route 24
  - County Route 24 (Monmouth County, New Jersey)
- New Mexico State Road 24
- New York State Route 24
  - County Route 24 (Allegany County, New York)
  - County Route 24 (Cattaraugus County, New York)
  - County Route 24 (Chemung County, New York)
  - County Route 24 (Clinton County, New York)
  - County Route 24 (Dutchess County, New York)
  - County Route 24 (Montgomery County, New York)
  - County Route 24 (Niagara County, New York)
  - County Route 24 (Onondaga County, New York)
  - County Route 24 (Ontario County, New York)
  - County Route 24 (Oswego County, New York)
  - County Route 24 (Putnam County, New York)
  - County Route 24 (Schenectady County, New York)
  - County Route 24 (Schoharie County, New York)
  - County Route 24 (Schuyler County, New York)
  - County Route 24 (St. Lawrence County, New York)
  - County Route 24 (Steuben County, New York)
  - County Route 24 (Suffolk County, New York)
  - County Route 24 (Sullivan County, New York)
  - County Route 24 (Ulster County, New York)
  - County Route 24 (Washington County, New York)
  - County Route 24 (Westchester County, New York)
- North Carolina Highway 24
- North Dakota Highway 24
- Ohio State Route 24 (1923-1927) (former)
- Oklahoma State Highway 24
- Oregon Highway 24 (former)
- Pennsylvania Route 24
- Rhode Island Route 24
- South Carolina Highway 24
- South Dakota Highway 24 (former)
- Tennessee State Route 24
- Texas State Highway 24
  - Texas State Highway Spur 24
  - Farm to Market Road 24
  - Texas Park Road 24
- Utah State Route 24
- Virginia State Route 24
  - State Route 24 (Virginia 1918-1933) (former)
- Washington State Route 24
- West Virginia Route 24
- Wisconsin Highway 24
- Wyoming Highway 24

Territories

- Puerto Rico Highway 24

== See also ==
- List of A24 roads
- List of N24 roads
- List of highways numbered 24A

Preceded by 23	Lists of highways 24	Succeeded by 25
