= IAAF Indoor Permit Meetings =

Track and field competitions (1997–2015)

- Sport: Indoor track and field
- Founded: 1997
- Ceased: 2015
- Continent: Global

The IAAF Indoor Permit Meetings were an annual series of indoor track and field competitions organized by the International Association of Athletics Federations (IAAF) from 1997 until the end of 2015 season. In 2016 IAAF launched the IAAF World Indoor Tour including four meetings which have all regularly held an IAAF Indoor Permit.

The series was known as the World Indoor Meetings from 2003 to 2007 before returning to its original name in 2008.

The IAAF Indoor Permit Meetings calendar was subject to change during its lifetime, with the number of meetings, the constituent meetings and the duration of the series all regularly changing from year to year. A total of seventeen meetings appeared in the history of the series, with dates ranging from mid-January to mid-March. The 2000 and 2001 series had the highest number of meetings (12) while the final series had the least (5). The Russian Winter Meeting in Moscow, Birmingham Indoor Grand Prix in Birmingham, and XL Galan in Stockholm were present in every edition of the series. The meetings were mostly in Europe, with the exceptions being the Millrose Games, Boston Indoor Games and Grand Prix d’Athlétisme de Montréal in North America, and the Gunma International in Japan.

== Editions ==
Edition	Year	Start date	End date	Meets	Ref.
1	1997	17 January	23 February	10	
2	1998	3 February	8 March	11	
3	1999	5 February	28 February	10	
4	2000	27 January	20 February	12	
5	2001	27 January	14 March	12	
6	2002	25 January	24 February	11	
7	2003	30 January	6 March	11	
8	2004	31 January	28 February	9	
9	2005	23 January	26 February	10	
10	2006	25 January	3 March	10	
11	2007	28 January	24 February	9	
12	2008	27 January	24 February	9	
13	2009	30 January	25 February	10	
14	2010	29 January	5 March	9	
15	2011	28 January	22 February	8	
16	2012	28 January	23 February	6	
17	2013	2 February	21 February	6	
18	2014	1 February	15 February	6	
19	2015	31 January	21 February	5	

== Meetings ==
#	Meeting	Arena	City	Country	'97	'98	'99	'00	'01	'02	'03	'04	'05	'06	'07	'08	'09	'10	'11	'12	'13	'14	'15
19	Russian Winter Meeting	CSKA Arena	Moscow	Russia	•	•	•	•	•	•	•	•	•	•	•	•	•	•	•	•	•	•	•
19	Aviva Indoor Grand Prix	National Indoor Arena	Birmingham	United Kingdom	•	•	•	•	•	•	•	•	•	•	•	•	•	•	•	•	•	•	•
19	XL Galan	Ericsson Globe	Stockholm	Sweden	•	•	•	•	•	•	•	•	•	•	•	•	•	•	•	•	•	•	•
17	Weltklasse in Karlsruhe	Europahalle	Karlsruhe	Germany	•			•	•	•	•	•	•	•	•	•	•	•	•	•	•	•	•
16	Millrose Games	Madison Square Garden	New York City	United States	•	•	•	•	•	•	•	•	•	•	•	•	•	•	•	•			
16	Indoor Flanders Meeting	Flanders Sports Arena	Ghent	Belgium		•	•	•	•	•	•	•	•	•	•	•	•	•	•		•	•	
14	Meeting Pas de Calais	Stade Couvert Régional	Liévin	France	•	•	•	•	•	•	•	•	•	•			•	•	•	•			
13	Sparkassen Cup	Hanns-Martin-Schleyer-Halle	Stuttgart	Germany			•	•	•	•	•	•	•	•	•	•	•	•	•				
10	Athina	Peace and Friendship Stadium	Athens	Greece				•	•	•	•	•	•	•	•	•	•						
7	Samsung Cup Budapest	Budapest Sports Arena	Budapest	Hungary	•	•	•	•	•	•	•												
6	Memorial José María Cagigal	Palacio de Deportes de la Comunidad de Madrid	Madrid	Spain	•	•	•	•	•				•										
5	Reunión Internacional de Atletismo	Luis Puig Palace	Valencia	Spain										•	•	•	•	•					
4	New Balance Indoor Grand Prix	RLTAC	Boston	United States		•															•	•	•
4	IHS Grand Prix Meeting	Helmut-Körnig-Halle	Dortmund	Germany				•	•	•	•												
2	Gunma International	Yamada Green Dome Maebashi	Maebashi	Japan	•	•																	
2	Volksbanken Raiffeisenbanken Leichtathletik Grand Prix IHS	Glaspalast Sindelfingen	Sindelfingen	Germany		•	•																
1	Grand Prix d’Athlétisme de Montréal	CSCR	Montreal	Canada	•																		

- The 2012 New York City leg was the U.S. Open Track and Field meet at Madison Square Garden. The Millrose Games moved to the Fort Washington Avenue Armory that year.
