= List of A24 roads =

This is a list of roads designated A24. Roads entries are sorted in the countries alphabetical order.

- A24 motorway (Austria), a road connecting Vienna and the A23 to Stockerau
- A 24 motorway (Germany), a road connecting Hamburg and Berlin
- A24 motorway (Italy), a road connecting Rome and the Adriatic Sea
- A24 motorway (Portugal), a road connecting Viseu and Chaves
- A-24 motorway (Spain), a proposed road to connect Daroca and Burgos
- A 24 road (Sri Lanka), a road connecting Matara and Akuressa
- A24 road (United Kingdom) may refer to:
  - A24 road (England), a road connecting London and Worthing
  - A24 road (Isle of Man), a road connecting the A3 and the A5
  - A24 road (Northern Ireland), a road connecting Belfast and Clough

== See also ==
- List of highways numbered 24
