= List of Oxford Street Christmas lights celebrities =

Oxford Street Christmas lights
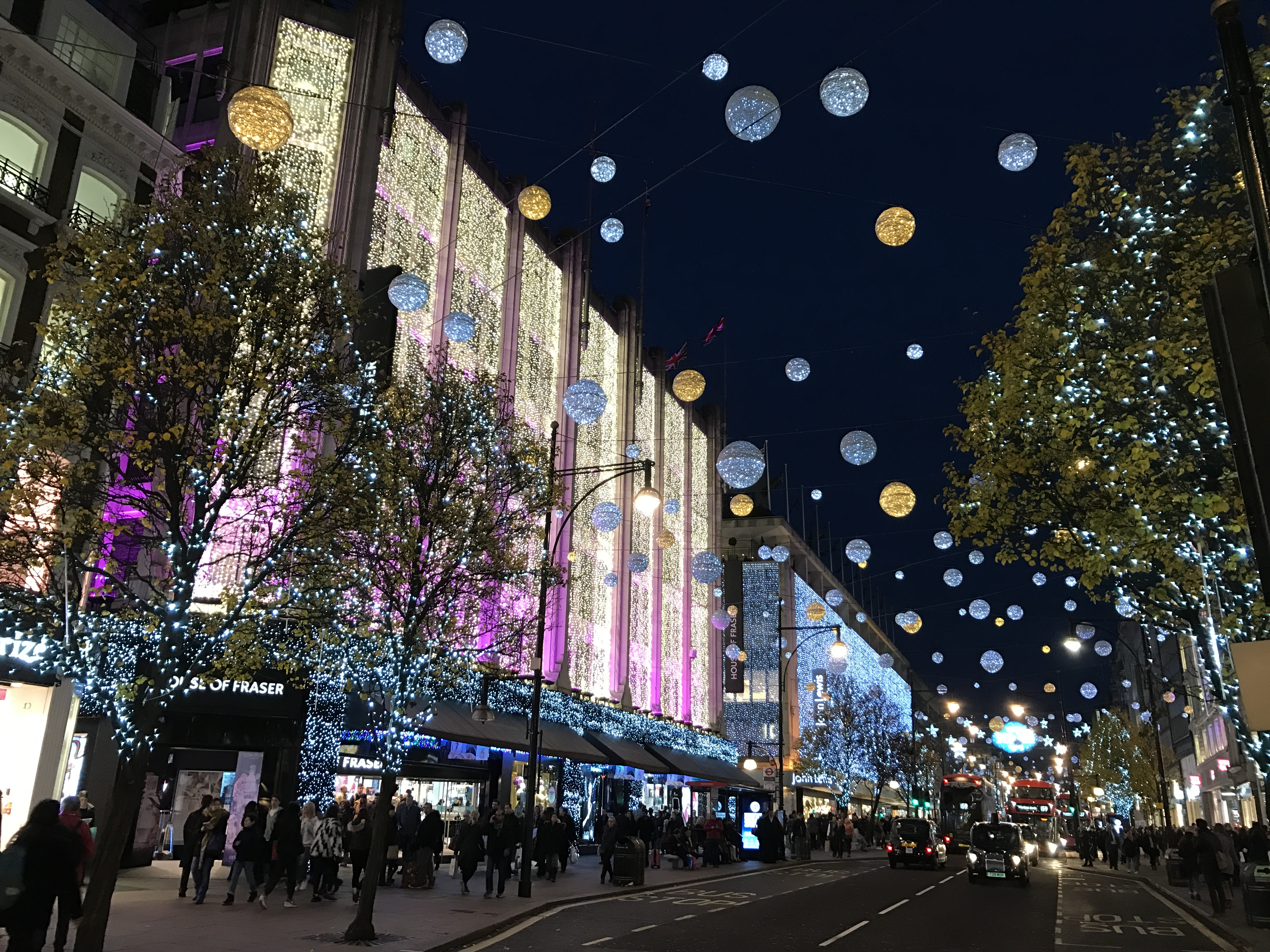
- The 2016 Oxford Street Christmas lights
- Genre: Christmas
- Frequency: Annually
- Venue: Oxford Street, West End of London
- Coordinates: 51.515269°N 0.142013°W
- Years active: 66
- Previous event: 2018
- Next event: 2019
- Organiser: Field and Lawn

Oxford Street, a main shopping street in Central London, has been decorated with various festive lights for many Christmas celebrations since 1959. They have been a regular and popular feature of Christmas in London.

The lights were originally installed in response to nearby Regent Street, which had featured Christmas lights since 1954. The lights were paid by shop owners and the local council, and were installed in order to give a sense of occasion to shoppers that could not be found anywhere else. The tradition fell out of favour by the early 1970s because of the economic climate, and no lights were featured for several years. It returned in the 1980s following campaigning from local traders.

Since 2010, management of the lights has been undertaken by Field and Lawn, a marquee hire company who also installed the Regent Street lights. Around 750,000 bulbs are used annually. Current practice involves a celebrity turning the lights on in mid- to late-November, and the lights remain until 6 January (Twelfth Night). The position of turning the lights on can be considered as an aspiration, and an indication that a particular celebrity is very popular. The festivities were postponed in 1963 due to the assassination of John F. Kennedy. In 2015, the lights were switched on earlier, on Sunday 1 November, resulting in an unusual closure of the street to all traffic. In 2018, there was not a celebrity guest at the light switch on and instead several performers played at various stores along the street.

The following celebrities have turned on the lights since 1981:

== 1980s ==
- 1981 — Pilín León (Miss World, Venezuela)
- 1982 — Daley Thompson
- 1983 — Pat Phoenix
- 1984 — Esther Rantzen
- 1985 — Bob Geldof
- 1986 — Leslie Grantham, Anita Dobson
- 1987 — Derek Jameson
- 1988 — Terry Wogan
- 1989 — Gorden Kaye

== 1990s ==
- 1990 — Cliff Richard
- 1991 — Westminster Children's Hospital
- 1992 — Linford Christie
- 1993 — Richard Branson
- 1994 — Lenny Henry
- 1995 — Coronation Street cast
- 1996 — Spice Girls
- 1997 — Peter Andre
- 1998 — Zoë Ball
- 1999 — Ronan Keating

== 2000s ==
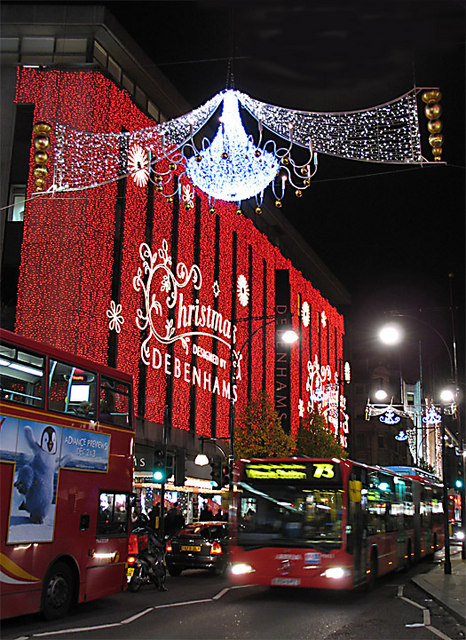
2006 Christmas lights, adjacent to Debenhams

- 2000 — Charlotte Church
- 2001 — S Club 7
- 2002 — Blue
- 2003 — Enrique Iglesias
- 2004 — Emma Watson, Il Divo, Steve Redgrave
- 2005 — Madonna
- 2006 — All Saints
- 2007 — Leona Lewis
- 2008 — Sugababes
- 2009 — Jim Carrey

== 2010s ==
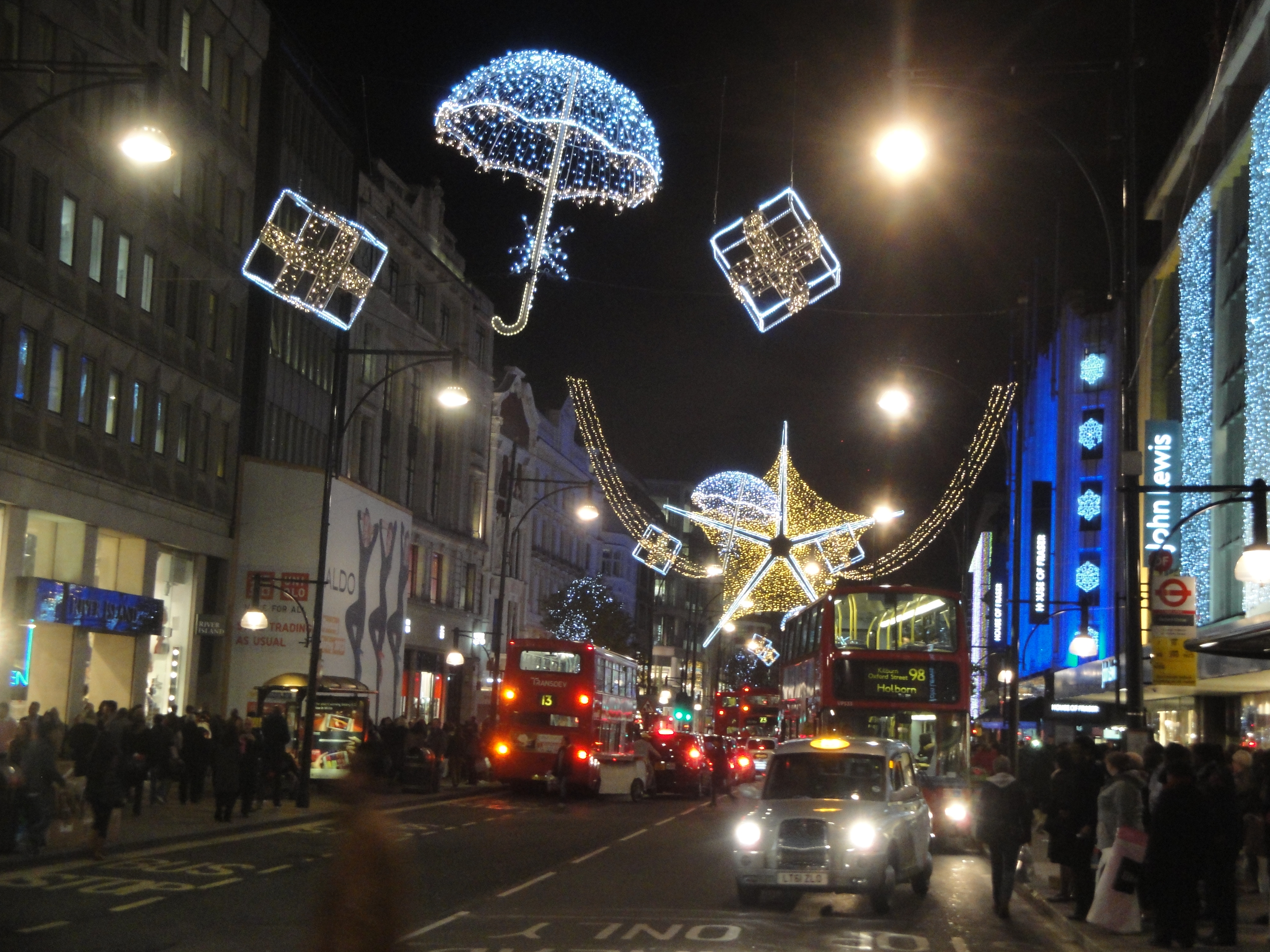
2011 Christmas lights

- 2010 — Children from Kids Company
- 2011 — The Saturdays
- 2012 — Robbie Williams
- 2013 — Jessie J
- 2014 — Cheryl Fernandez-Versini
- 2015 — Kylie Minogue
- 2016 — Craig David
- 2017 — Rita Ora, Vick Hope & Roman Kemp
- 2018 — N/A
- 2020 - Mia & Amalia Corsi
- 2020 - Gareth Eighteen
