= List of RAF cadets =

This is a list of notable members of the Air Training Corps or Combined Cadet Force (RAF Section).

- Danny Blanchflower
- Richard Burton
- Geoff Capes
- Linford Christie
- John Conteh
- Timothy Dalton
- Len Deighton
- Tom Fletcher
- Michael Foale
- Neil Fox (broadcaster)
- Robson Green
- Raimund Herincx
- James Hickman
- Brian Jones
- Thomas Kerr (engineer)
- Warren Mitchell
- Patrick Moore
- Michael Nicholson
- Gary Numan
- Paul Nurse
- Nicholas Patrick
- Bill Pertwee
- Brian Rix
- Ralph Robins
- Chris Ryan
- Piers Sellers
- John Sherwood (athlete)
- Alan Sillitoe
- Laura Trevelyan
- Rory Underwood
- Alan Ward
- Will Whitehorn
- Andrew Wilson
- Bill Wyman
