= 24A =

24A may refer to:

- M-24A (Michigan highway)
- South Dakota Highway 24A
- AAA battery's American National Standards Institute technical designation

== See also ==
- A24 (disambiguation)
