= Sara Payne: A Mother's Story =

2004 book by Sara Payne

- Cover of the British hardcover edition
- Author: Sara Payne
- Language: English
- Genre: Autobiography, true crime
- Publisher: Hodder and Stoughton
- Publication date: 2004
- Publication place: United Kingdom
- Media type: Print (Hardcover & Paperback)
- ISBN: 978-0-340-86275-9
- OCLC: 55954094

Sara Payne: A Mother's Story by Sara Payne, published by Hodder and Stoughton in May 2004, gives her account of the July 2000 abduction and murder of her daughter Sarah Payne in Kingston Gorse, West Sussex, England.

== Synopsis ==
The autobiography covers the abduction and murder of her daughter Sarah on 1 July 2000, and the effects that it had on her, her family and the community.

The first chapter of the book tells the story of Payne's life from 1985 and the age of 16, when shortly after leaving school she met her future husband Michael, and up to the stage when she had given birth to four of her five children.

The following two chapters tell of Sarah's disappearance and then of the news that her body had been found.

Further into the story, Sara tells of her campaigning for the introduction of Sarah's Law—and of how Mike confessed to her that he had paid for a gun and was preparing to shoot suspect Roy Whiting if he managed to avoid conviction for Sarah's murder. Whiting was eventually brought to trial, found guilty of murder and sentenced to life imprisonment in December 2001.

Later on, just over a year after Whiting's trial, Sara Payne discovered that she was pregnant with her fifth child. At first she was apprehensive about having another baby, but eventually decided to go ahead with her pregnancy. But this did little to relieve the dark clouds that had been hanging over the Payne family since Sarah's death, particularly the strain on their marriage. Michael and Sara Payne separated in August 2003, although they remained good friends and were hoping that they might be able to rebuild their marriage.

The final chapter of the book tells of Sara giving birth to her fifth child, Ellie, in late 2003. She tells the reader that Ellie's birth gave the family new hope and some much-awaited happiness after more than three years of misery.

== Aftermath ==
Since the book was published, Sara Payne has received an Order of the British Empire and an honorary doctorate in recognition of her contribution to child protection procedures in Britain. She has also become a grandmother.

However, Sara Payne suffered a near-fatal brain aneurysm in December 2009, and the family suffered a fresh tragedy in October 2014, when her former husband Michael Payne died at the age of 46. He had been separated from Sara Payne for 11 years by this stage, despite their initial hopes of rebuilding their marriage, and was living alone in Maidstone, Kent, at the time of his death. His death is believed to have been caused by an alcoholism related illness after suffering from years of depression following his daughter's abduction. He had moved away from his native Surrey in 2006 after his friend Levi Bellfield was charged with the murder of two young women, and was later convicted of both murders and at a later stage the highly publicised murder of local teenager Amanda "Milly" Dowler.
