= Peter Cox (author) =

British writer

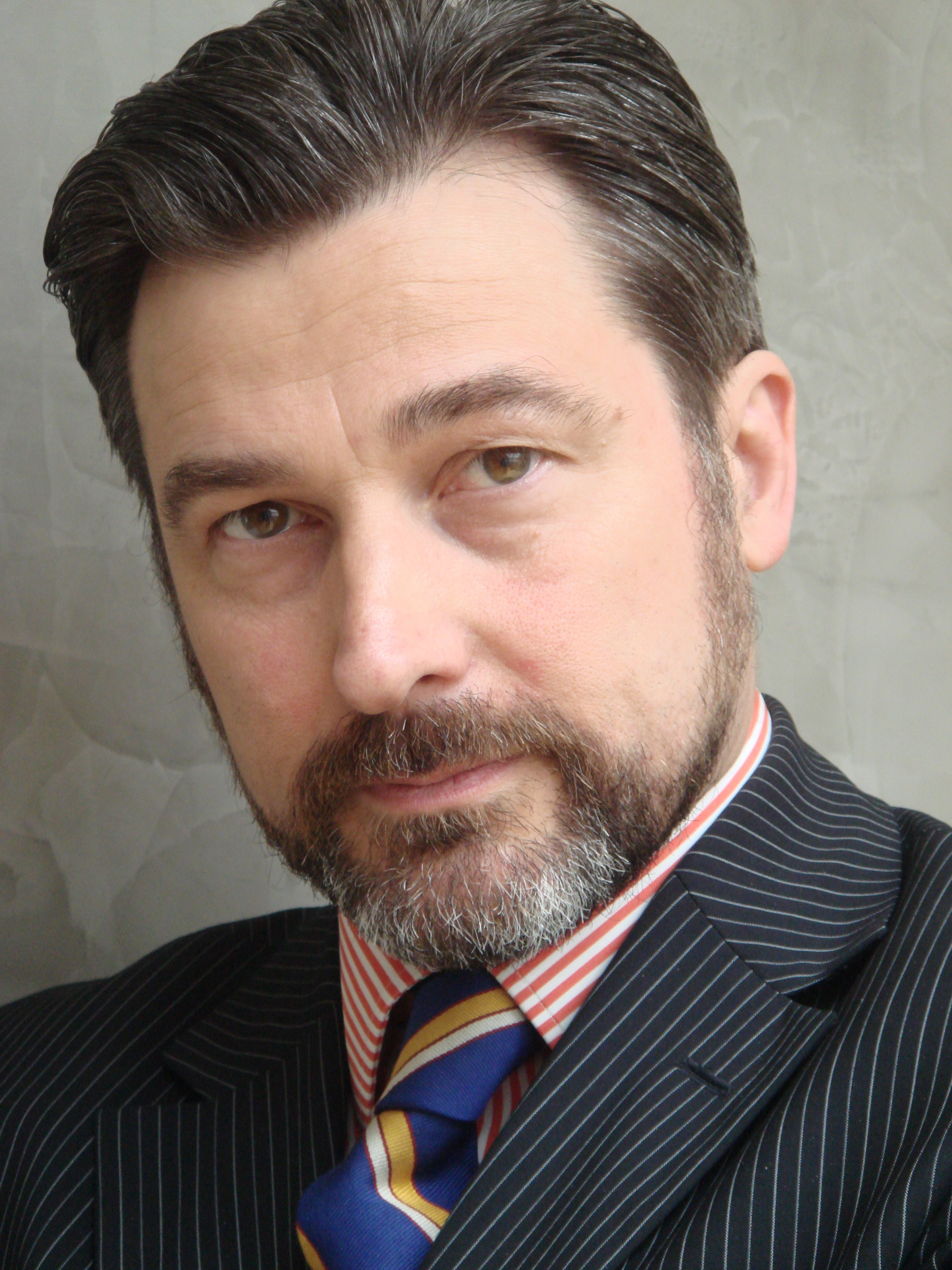
Cox in 2007

Peter Cox is an English author and vegetarianism activist. He has authored more than 20 books, including Why You Don’t Need Meat. He was the first chief executive of the Vegetarian Society and is now a literary agent working in London and New York.

== Biography ==
Cox was born in Carlisle, Cumbria, England and brought up in Whitehaven until a nuclear accident at nearby Sellafield (the world's worst prior to Chernobyl) precipitated an abrupt family move to the North Norfolk coast. He grew up in a remote village, Walcott-On-Sea, and later became a self-employed photographer. When the North Sea gas and oil boom occurred, Cox undertook a growing amount of large-format industrial photography. His company grew to employ 25 people and became a full-service advertising agency, with clients such as the FMC Corp., Philips Business Systems and other large regional clients. The business was sold when Cox was 29. He then moved to Manchester in 1985 to become the first chief executive of the Vegetarian Society of the United Kingdom, a post he held for six weeks.

== Vegetarianism ==
Cox became a vegetarian at aged 2. He initiated a number of major changes at the Vegetarian Society including a higher public profile, an expanded membership, vigorous ongoing debates with the Meat and Livestock Commission, the establishment of the Cordon Vert cookery school with television personality Sarah Brown, and a new magazine. Cox's reforms were not universally appreciated and internal disagreements brought about his resignation.

In 1986 Cox wrote published Why You Don’t Need Meat. It gained major public attention and won the Booksellers’ Association Award for the Best Non-Fiction Publicity Campaign of the Year. The book was essentially a polemic that presented the health, environmental and ethical reasons for a meat-free diet. An early appearance on BBC television's "Wogan" was seen by millions of people and propelled the book to the no. 1 position on the paperback charts, selling 100,000 copies in the UK alone (it was subsequently published in the United States, France, Germany, Japan and many other countries).

Cox continued to write and co-write, with his wife Peggy Brusseau, numerous books, including many bestsellers such as The Quick Cholesterol Clean Out (Century), The New Why You Don’t Need Meat, (Bloomsbury), Peter Cox’s Guide to Vegetarian Living (Bloomsbury), The Realeat Encyclopedia of Vegetarian Living (Bloomsbury), Superliving! (Vermillion), Secret Ingredients (Bantam), LifePoints (Bloomsbury), The LifePoints Diet (Bloomsbury), LifePoints for Kids (Bloomsbury), The LifePoints Counter (Bloomsbury), The LifePoints Cookbook (Bloomsbury), You Don’t Need Meat (St. Martin's Press), several of which were serialized in British national newspapers.

== Literary agent ==
Cox gradually started working with authors, developing their book proposals and initially selling them through an external literary agency. This arrangement was superseded when Cox established his own agency. Clients include the worldwide bestselling children's author Michelle Paver, US Senator Orrin Hatch, Nicholas Booth, television journalist and former MP Martin Bell OBE, science writer Brian Clegg, children's authors Joe Donnelly, M. G. Harris and Amanda Lees, and former editor of The Sun newspaper David Yelland. Cox is now managing director of Redhammer Management, a literary agency recognized by the Association of Authors' Agents.

== Other ==
Cox was an expert witness for the defence in the "McLibel" trial. He was a close observer of the events of 11 September 2001 in New York and has written about what he saw. He founded the internet writers’ community Litopia, is agent-in-residence there and currently hosts the Litopia podcast for writers.
