= Murder of Sarah Payne =

2000 abduction and murder of a child in Walton on Thames, Surrey, England

Sarah Payne
- Born: Sarah Evelyn Isobel Payne; 13 October 1991; Walton-on-Thames, Surrey, England
- Died: c. 1 July 2000 (aged 8); West Sussex, England
- Cause of death: Suspected strangulation, suffocation or a combination of both
- Body discovered: Pulborough, West Sussex, 17 July 2000
- Parent(s): Michael and Sara Payne

Sarah Evelyn Isobel Payne (13 October 1991 – c. 1 July 2000) was the victim of a high-profile abduction and murder in West Sussex, England, in July 2000.

Her disappearance and the subsequent investigation into her murder became a prominent case in the United Kingdom, as did the campaign for changes to child protection legislation that resulted from the murder. The murder investigation was also notable for the use of forensic evidence, which played a major role in securing a conviction.

Roy Whiting was convicted of abduction and murder in December 2001 and sentenced to life imprisonment.

== Sarah Payne's disappearance ==
Sarah Payne, aged 8, who lived in Hersham, Surrey, disappeared on the evening of 1 July 2000 from a cornfield in Kingston Lane, near the home of her grandfather, Terence Payne, and his second wife Lesley, in Kingston Gorse, West Sussex, England. Sarah had been playing with her two brothers (aged 13 and 11) and younger sister (aged 5) when she disappeared. A police search of the local area commenced, and quickly transformed into a nationwide search and national news story, with members of the Payne family (mostly her parents, Michael and Sara) making daily television and newspaper appeals for her safe return.

Police officers and numerous volunteers scoured the area around Littlehampton for clues to Sarah's disappearance. On 10 July, police announced that they had received information regarding the sighting of a girl who matched Sarah's description at Knutsford Services on the M6 motorway in Cheshire on the morning after her disappearance. Three days later, Michael and Sara Payne were warned by police to "prepare for the worst", explaining that the emphasis of their inquiries had shifted and that there was a possibility that their daughter might not be found safe and well.

Police first visited Roy Whiting's Littlehampton flat on the afternoon of 2 July 2000, but he was not there. They returned that evening and questioned him for over an hour. When police returned and Whiting attempted to drive away in his van, he was stopped by police. He spent two days in custody but there was insufficient evidence to press charges and he was released on bail. By that time, police had found a receipt for fuel at Buck Barn garage on the A24, near Pulborough. The receipt contradicted Whiting's alibi of being at a funfair in Hove at 5:30 p.m. and then back at his flat by 9:30 p.m. on the night of Sarah's disappearance. After his release, Whiting did not return to his flat and went to live with his father in Crawley.

On 17 July, a body was found in a field near Pulborough, West Sussex, 15 miles (24 km) from Kingston Gorse, where Sarah was last seen. The next day, Sussex Police confirmed that the body had been identified as that of Sarah Payne. Three days after Sarah's body was found, a shoe was recovered from a roadside in the village of Coolham, three miles from Pulborough, and identified as one of those belonging to Sarah Payne.

On 23 July 2000, Whiting stole a Vauxhall Nova in Crawley and was pursued by police at speeds of up to 70 miles per hour (113 km/h) before he crashed into a parked vehicle. Whiting was arrested on charges of car theft and dangerous driving. He was remanded in custody until 27 September 2000, when he pleaded guilty to those charges and was jailed for 22 months. While he was in jail, police carried out forensic testing on his 1988 white Fiat Ducato van, which he had bought on 23 June 2000.

On 6 February 2001, following seven months of investigation, Whiting was charged with the murder of Sarah Payne.

== Trial ==
On 6 February 2001, Whiting appeared at Lewes Crown Court and was charged with abduction and murder. He pleaded not guilty to both charges and was remanded in custody to continue serving his sentence for the motoring offences.

Whiting's trial began on 14 November 2001, at Lewes Crown Court. The jury heard from several witnesses. The key witnesses included Sarah Payne's oldest brother Lee, who had seen a 'scruffy-looking man with yellowish teeth' driving through Kingston Gorse on the evening that Sarah went missing. However, Lee Payne had not picked out Whiting during an identity parade. Fibres from Whiting's van were found on Sarah Payne's recovered shoe, the only item of Payne's clothing to be recovered. A strand of blonde hair on a T-shirt was found in Whiting's van; a DNA test established there was a one-in-a-billion chance of it belonging to anyone other than Sarah. The jury also heard the testimony of two motorists who recalled a white van being parked at the roadside and pulling off a track on the evening of 1 July 2000, near the site where Payne's body was later found.

On 12 December 2001, after a four-week trial before Mr Justice Curtis and a jury, Whiting was convicted of the abduction and murder of Sarah and was sentenced to life imprisonment. The trial judge said it was a rare case in which a life sentence should mean life.

After Whiting was convicted, his previous convictions were revealed—they had been withheld from the jury and media so as not to bias the jury and open the door for a future appeal. Whiting's exposure as a repeat offender sparked renewed calls for the government to allow controlled public access to the sex offender's register. On the day after Whiting's conviction, the Home Office commented that such a system would be "unworkable," as it could drive paedophiles "underground", making it more difficult for the police to monitor and locate them, and it would put them in danger of vigilante attacks.

This case is notable for the extensive use of forensic science in establishing the prosecution case against Whiting. Twenty forensic experts from the fields of entomology, palynology and environmental profiling, oil and lubricant analysis, pathology, geology, and archaeology were employed. It has been estimated that the investigation involved 1,000 personnel and cost nearly £3 million.

=== Sentencing ===
On 24 November 2002, Home Secretary David Blunkett ordered that Roy Whiting serve a minimum of 50 years in prison, making him ineligible for parole until 2051, when he would be 92. This was in effect an agreement with the trial judge's recommendation of a whole life tariff. Within 48 hours of the ruling, the Law Lords and the European Court of Human Rights had ruled in favour of another convicted murderer (Anthony Anderson) who challenged the right of politicians to decide how long a murderer must spend in prison before being considered for parole.

In June 2004, the media reported that Whiting was applying to the Court of Appeal for a reduction of his sentence. Whiting's lawyers argued that the 50-year tariff was politically motivated, as the decision was made at a time when the government was under fire from the public and media over a firefighters' strike. On 9 June 2010, a High Court Judge reduced Whiting's sentence by 10 years; he will be eligible to apply for parole in 2041, when he will be 82. Payne's mother, Sara, was present at the hearing; she said she was "disappointed" by the decision and said that "life should mean life".

== Roy Whiting ==
Roy Whiting
- Born: Roy William Whiting; 26 January 1959 (age 67); Horsham, West Sussex, England
- Occupations: Car mechanic, delivery worker, building labourer
- Spouse: Linda Booker (m. 1986–1990)
- Children: 2
- Status: Incarcerated at HM Prison Wakefield
- Convictions: Indecent assault, theft, dangerous driving, abduction, murder
- Penalty: Life imprisonment (minimum term of 40 years)

Roy William Whiting was born in Horsham on 26 January 1959, one of six children born to George and Pamela Whiting; three children did not survive infancy. The family lived in Langley Green, Crawley. Whiting attended Jordans Junior & Infant School and Ifield Community College, but he found school difficult and left early, taking a string of manual-labour jobs. During the 1970s, his parents separated, and a teenage Whiting stayed with his father.

Having worked in several different jobs, Whiting trained as a mechanic during the 1980s, and went to work for a firm in Crawley, before starting his own business in this trade. He also developed a keen interest in banger racing, building his own cars and driving for the Gatwick Flyers team under the nickname "Flying Fish".

In June 1986, Whiting married Linda Booker, who worked as a petrol pump attendant. As his business failed, the marriage fell apart and they separated before their son was born the following year. They divorced in 1990. Around this time, Whiting fathered a daughter with another unnamed woman.

=== First conviction ===
On 4 March 1995, an eight-year-old girl was abducted and sexually assaulted in the Langley Green area of Crawley. Whiting was arrested several weeks later; a man who knew him came forward after hearing that the abductor's car was a red Ford Sierra, which matched the description of the car that Whiting had just sold. The vehicle was traced by police to its new owner and a knife was found hidden in it - the abductor had told his victim that he had a knife.

On 23 June 1995, Whiting admitted to charges of abduction and indecent assault, and was sentenced to four years in prison. The maximum sentence for the crime was life imprisonment; however, he received a lesser sentence because he had admitted to the crime at an early opportunity, although a psychiatrist who assessed Whiting after his conviction said that he was likely to re-offend once he was released.

Whiting was released from prison in November 1997, having served 2 years and 5 months of his 4-year sentence, and was one of the first people in Britain to go on the sex offenders' register. After refusing to participate in a sex offender rehabilitation programme, he was forced to serve an extra five months before being released on licence.

=== Attacks in prison ===
Whiting has been attacked in prison several times since he began his life sentence. On 4 August 2002, Whiting was slashed with a razor by another prisoner at HMP Wakefield. In June 2004, convicted murderer Rickie Tregaskis was found guilty of carrying out the attack, which left Whiting with a 6-inch (150 mm) scar on his right cheek. Tregaskis, already serving life for the murder of a disabled man in Cornwall, received a six-year sentence for the attack. In July 2011, Whiting was stabbed in the eye by convicted murderer Gary Vinter. Whiting's injuries were not life-threatening, no charge was pressed by Whiting, and no police investigation was undertaken.

A fourth attack on Whiting took place on 8 November 2018, when he was stabbed by two other prisoners in his cell. He was taken to hospital for treatment but was returned to prison shortly after in a stable condition. On 11 February 2024, still at HM Prison Wakefield, Whiting was again attacked. A spokesman for West Yorkshire Police said that a prisoner at HMP Wakefield was "treated for minor injuries following an incident involving another offender".

== Aftermath ==
=== Sarah's Law ===
After Sarah Payne's murder, her parents, along with the News of the World, campaigned for the adoption of "Sarah's Law", under which members of the public would have the right to ask police forces if a person with access to a child has a record of committing sexual offences against children. It was to be similar to "Megan's Law" in the USA. The scheme was introduced in four pilot areas of England and Wales in September 2008. In August 2010 the Home Office announced that, after proving successful, the Child Sex Offender Disclosure Scheme would be extended to cover the whole of England and Wales by spring 2011.

=== Payne family ===
In July 2001, it was reported that Sarah's parents received £11,000 compensation from the Criminal Injuries Compensation Authority, an executive agency of the UK Government. Sara Payne described the offer as a "sick joke" and "derisory", even though it was the maximum CICA could offer by law. Media sources were also keen to criticise the payout and compare it to much higher payouts made in criminal and civil law for relatively minor injuries and work related stress.

In 2004, the book Sara Payne: A Mother's Story, by Sara Payne, about her daughter's murder and the campaign for Sarah's Law, was published by Hodder & Stoughton.

Sara Payne was made a Member of the Order of the British Empire (MBE) in December 2008 for her work toward the passing of Sarah's Law. In December 2009, she suffered a life-threatening stroke and collapsed while at her home but went on to make a good recovery.

In July 2011, it was revealed that Sara Payne had been among those targeted in the News International phone hacking scandal. She refused to believe it, since the News of the World had been so helpful in championing Sarah's Law. She even wrote an editorial in the newspaper's final edition. Investigators initially thought she was not hacked because her name did not come up in records. However, personal details relating to her were found that were attributed to another suspected victim. Sara's phone that was hacked was given to her by the News of the World's Rebekah Brooks, editor at the time of Sarah's murder.

Sarah's father, Michael, suffered from depression following the disappearance of his daughter. He separated from Sara after 18 years of marriage in August 2003, and subsequently became an alcoholic, leading to a 16-month jail term for attacking his brother with a glass in December 2011, while intoxicated. On 30 October 2014, he was found dead at his home in Maidstone, Kent. Police reported there were no suspicious circumstances; he was believed to have died of an alcohol-related illness several days before his body was found.

== See also ==
- List of kidnappings (2000–2009)
- List of solved missing person cases (2000s)
- Jessica's Law
- Megan's Law
- Clare's Law
- Death of Vishal Mehrotra – unsolved 1981 case of a child abducted from London and similarly found murdered in a rural area of West Sussex
