= A24 (disambiguation) =

A24 is a film distribution, production and finance company.

A24, A-24 or A.24 may also refer to:

== Transportation ==
- A24 motorway (Austria), a road connecting Vienna and the A23 to Stockerau
- A 24 motorway (Germany), a road connecting Hamburg and Berlin
- A24 motorway (Italy), a road connecting Rome and the Adriatic Sea
- A24 motorway (Portugal), a road connecting Viseu and Chaves
- A-24 motorway (Spain), a proposed road to connect Daroca and Burgos
- A 24 road (Sri Lanka), a road connecting Matara and Akuressa
- A24 road (United Kingdom) may refer to:
  - A24 road (England), a road connecting London and Worthing
  - A24 road (Isle of Man), a road connecting the A3 and the A5
  - A24 road (Northern Ireland), a road connecting Belfast and Clough
- MAN NG363F, a bendy bus model with the chassis code MAN A24

== Military ==
- A-24 Banshee, World War II U.S. Army dive bomber
- Aero A.24, a Czech bomber design of the 1920s

== Media and entertainment ==
- A24 news channel, a pan-African 24-hour station starting broadcasting from Nairobi in 2008
- América 24, recently known as A24, an Argentine news cable TV channel
- Samsung Galaxy A24, an Android-based smartphone by Samsung Electronics

== Other uses ==
- British NVC community A24 (Juncus bulbosus community), a plant community
- English Opening, Bremen System, Fianchetto Line, a chess opening classified as ECO A24
- HLA-A24, an HLA-A serotype
- A24, a rodent trap made by Goodnature

== See also ==
- 24A (disambiguation)
