= Oregon Highway 24 =

There is no present signed or unsigned highway numbered 24 in the U.S. state of Oregon. Oregon Highway 24 has been used in the past on two unsigned highways:

- Rim Highway around Crater Lake, 1917 to mid-1920s
- Oregon Route 78, formerly known as Burns-Crane Highway No. 24
