= Ron Roddan =

British athletics coach (died 2023)

Ron Roddan (8 May 1931 – 10 February 2023) was a British athletics coach. He was best known for coaching British sprinter Linford Christie, whom he began coaching in 1979. A former Civil Service laboratory assistant, Roddan was himself a sprinter in the Fifties and Sixties. During his coaching career, he has had more than 30 athletes selected for the British team. Roddan coached Malcolm Christie.

Roddan first met Christie while the sprinter was attending school in Fulham, London.

Speaking in a High Court libel hearing in 1998, Roddan told the jury that a magazine article by John McVicar alleging Linford Christie took drugs to get to the top was a "fairy story", describing a suggestion that the Olympic gold medallist's impressive physique may have been due to taking steroids or other performance-enhancing banned substances as "ridiculous". In 2001, in response to claims by Sebastian Coe that Christie's time as British athletic captain was marred by "continual conflict," Roddan said he was "surprised that someone of such so-called brevity would come out with a load of rubbish like this" and insisted that Christie enjoyed the support of his fellow athletes in the various British athletic teams that he competed in.

In February 2011, Roddan received London's Regional Council Performance Coach of the Year Award. Prior to this, in October 2010, he had received the national Performance Coach award at the England Athletics Hall of Fame and National Volunteer Awards.

Roddan died on 10 February 2023, at the age of 91.
