= Indoor Flanders Meeting =

Indoor Flanders
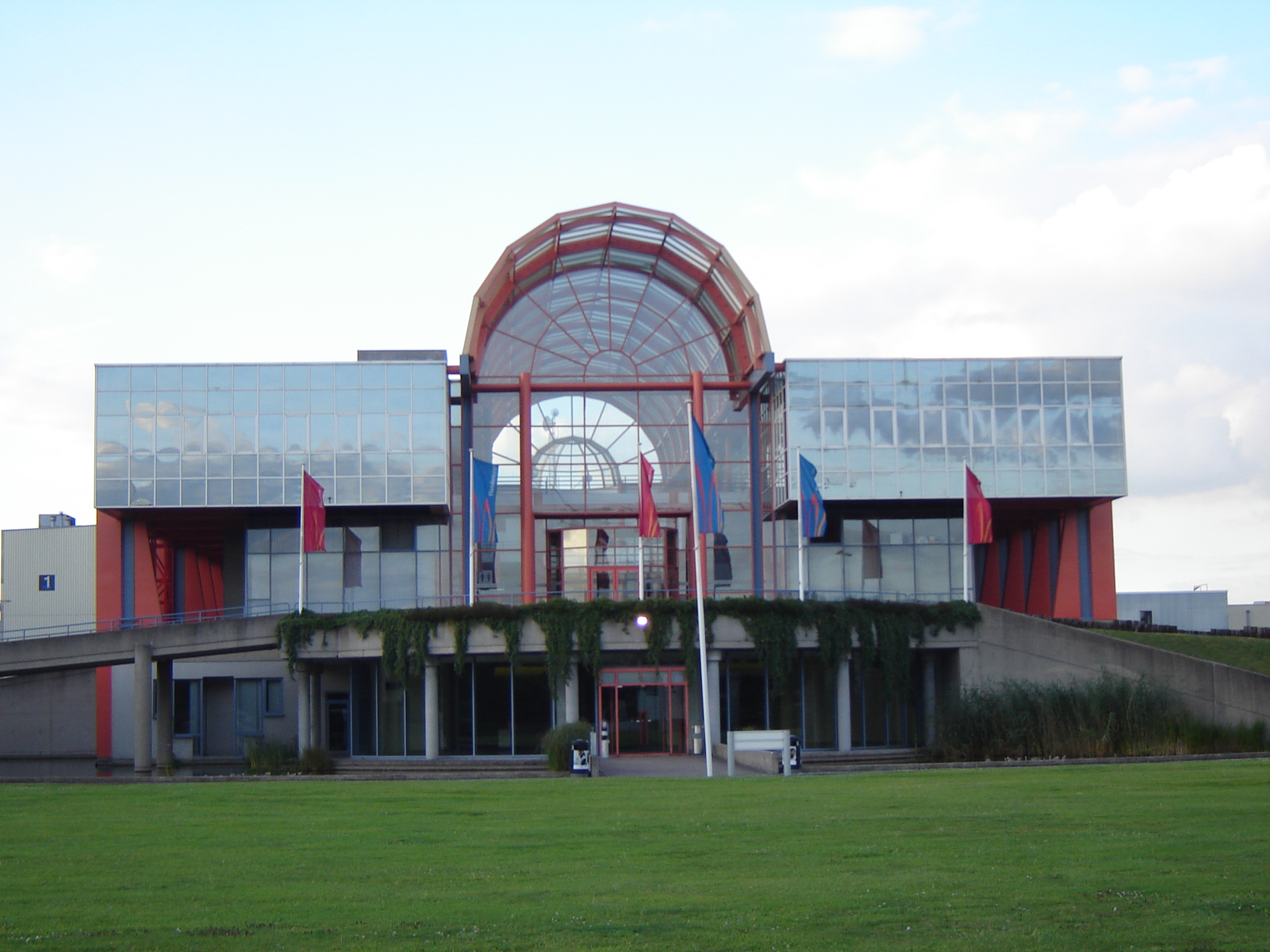
- The meeting was previously held at the Flanders Expo arena
- Date: Mid-February
- Location: Ghent, Belgium
- Event type: Indoor track and field
- Established: 1990
- Website: Indoor Flanders

The Indoor Flanders meeting was an annual indoor track and field meeting which took place at the Flanders Sports Arena in Ghent, Belgium. It was one of foremost meetings on the indoor European circuit and one of nine events which hold IAAF Indoor Permit Meeting status.

First held in 1990, the competition was originally held at the Flanders Expo arena and moved to the Flanders Sports Arena in 2000. Over its history the meeting has been sponsored by Energizer, KBC Bank, and Toyota (its current sponsor). The 23rd edition in 2012 was annulled because of loss sponsorship. After taking a year off, the Flanders Indoor Meeting returns in 2013 and 2014 but was cancelled from 2015 onwards.

== World records ==
Over the course of its history, three world records have been set at the Indoor Flanders Meeting.

World records set at the Indoor Flanders Meeting
Year	Event	Record	Athlete	Nationality
1995	3000 m	7:35.15	Moses Kiptanui	Kenya
1997	Mile	3:48.45	Hicham El Guerrouj	Morocco
2002	Pole vault	4.73 m	Svetlana Feofanova	Russia

== Meeting records ==
=== Men ===
Men's meeting records of the Indoor Flanders Meeting
Event	Record	Athlete	Nationality	Date	Ref.
60 m	6.45	Andre Cason	United States	1992	
200 m	20.37	Frankie Fredericks	Namibia	1996	
300 m	32.15	Pavel Maslák	Czech Republic	9 February 2014	
400 m	45.45	Jamie Baulch	United Kingdom	1997	
600 m	1:15.65	Kevin Borlée	Belgium	13 February 2011	
800 m	1:45.72	Tony Morrell	United Kingdom	1988	
1000 m	2:16.15	Abubaker Kaki Khamis	Sudan	28 February 2008	
1500 m	3:33.01	Hicham El Guerrouj	Morocco	1997	
Mile	3:48.45	Hicham El Guerrouj	Morocco	1997	
2000 m	5:02.53	John Mayock	United Kingdom	2000	
3000 m	7:35.15	Moses Kiptanui	Kenya	1995	
Two miles	8:09.89	Hicham El Guerrouj	Morocco	2001	
5000 m	13:11.39	Alberto García	Spain	2003	
60 m hurdles	7.38	Colin Jackson	United Kingdom	1994	
2000 m steeplechase	5:13.77	Paul Kipsiele Koech	Kenya	13 February 2011	
Pole vault	5.90 m	Maksim Tarasov	Russia	1998	
High jump	2:30 m	Vyacheslav Voronin	Russia	2000	
Long jump	8.40 m	Iván Pedroso	Cuba	1997	
Triple jump	17.42 m	Marian Oprea	Romania	26 February 2006	

=== Women ===
Women's meeting records of the Indoor Flanders Meeting
Event	Record	Athlete	Nationality	Date	Ref.
60 m	6.97	Irina Privalova	Russia	1995	
200 m	22.47	Irina Privalova	Russia	1992	
400m	51.50	Charity Opara	Nigeria	1998	
800 m	1:56.85	Stephanie Graf	Austria	2002	
1500 m	4:04.80	Genzebe Dibaba	Ethiopia	14 February 2010	
3000 m	8:41.67	Mariem Alaoui Selsouli	Morocco	26 February 2006	
5000 m	15:07.39	Gabriela Szabo	Romania	1998	
60 m hurdles	7.82	Brigita Bukovec	Slovenia	1999	
High jump	2.00 m	Blanka Vlašić	Croatia	26 February 2006	
Pole vault	4.76 m	Anna Rogowska	Poland	9 February 2014	
Long jump	6.61 m	Olga Rublyova	Russia	2000	
Triple jump	14.47 m	Ashia Hansen	United Kingdom	1998	
