= List of N24 roads =

This is a list of roads abbreviated N24.

- N24 road (Belgium)
- N24 road (France)
- N24 road (Ireland)
- N24 road (Luxembourg)
- N24 road (Switzerland)
- Nebraska Highway 24, a state highway in the U.S. state of Nebraska

== See also ==
- List of highways numbered 24
