= Sara Payne =

British media campaigner

Sara Jane Payne, MBE (née Williams; born 1 March 1969) is a British media campaigner known for her campaign for parents' right for a controlled access to the sex offender registry, spurred by the murder of her daughter Sarah in 2000.

== Biography ==
Sara Payne, born Sara Jane Williams was born in Walton-on-Thames, Surrey, England, on 1 March 1969. She left school in 1985, at the age of 16. Shortly afterwards, she met her future husband Michael Payne. They married in West Sussex on 4 August 1990 and had a total of five children who were born between 1987 and 2003. They announced their separation in September 2003, blaming the strain of coping with the murder of their daughter Sarah three years earlier. They had four surviving children; two sons and two daughters, the youngest daughter born in late 2003 just after their separation.

On 27 October 2014, Michael Payne was found dead at the age of 45 at his home in Maidstone, Kent. He and his wife had been separated for 11 years by this stage, despite media reports in the early stages of their separation that they had been hoping to get back together. The death of Michael Payne was not treated as suspicious; there was no inquest as he was believed to have died of natural causes several days earlier.

Sara Payne also endured the death of her 44-year-old brother Paul from cancer in January 2003, and her mother Elizabeth Williams died from the same illness the following year – media sources including the Daily Mirror wrongly reported at the time that it was Lesley Payne, the step-mother of Michael Payne, who had died. Her father Brian Williams died in 2007, having been left partially paralysed by an aneurysm at the age of 55. Brian and Elizabeth Williams separated in 1986.

== Campaign for Sarah's Law ==
Since the murder of her daughter Sarah in July 2000, she has campaigned for parents to be given the right to know if a convicted child sex offender is living in their community. In 2008, eight years after the start of the campaign, a pilot scheme was introduced by four British police forces. The success of this scheme was reported in Home Office figures to have protected over 60 children during this pilot, and was extended across England and Wales in 2011, protecting more than 200 children in its first year.

In 2004, she published a book, Sara Payne: A Mother's Story, which was centered on her daughter's murder, the tragedy's effect on the family, and her campaign for Sarah's Law, as well as an opening chapter which detailed her life in the 15 years preceding the murder. In 2003-4 she cofounded The Phoenix Post with Shy Keenan, an organisation that advocates for children's rights.

== Awards and honours ==
On 31 December 2008, Sara Payne was made an MBE in the New Year Honours list. On 26 January 2009, she was appointed Victims Champion by the Justice Secretary Jack Straw. In 2012, Sara Payne was granted an honorary doctorate by the Open University. Payne is currently a trustee of The Phoenix Trust, an organization that assisted victims of child sex abuse, and combatted such abuse.

== Health ==
On 23 December 2009, Sara Payne was taken to St George's Hospital, Tooting, south London, following complications after brain surgery in the summer of 2008 to cure a ruptured aneurysm. On 24 December 2009, it was stated that she was critically ill. Later reports indicated that she had responded well to treatment and she came out of hospital several weeks later.

== News International phone hacking scandal ==
On 28 July 2011, it was reported that Sara Payne's mobile phone was one of those targeted by the News of the World as part of the News International phone hacking scandal, which had led to owner Rupert Murdoch's decision to close the newspaper down soon after the allegations were publicised earlier that month. She was said to be "absolutely devastated and deeply disappointed" at the disclosure, while a colleague close to her said that she was "in bits" over the affair.
