= List of highways numbered 24A =

Route 24A, or Highway 24A, may refer to:

- Florida State Road 24A
- M-24A (Michigan highway) (former)
- Nebraska Link 24A
- New York State Route 24A (former)
  - County Route 24A (Livingston County, New York)
  - County Route 24A (Oneida County, New York)
- South Dakota Highway 24A
- Utah State Route 24A (former)
