= Sparkassen Cup (athletics) =

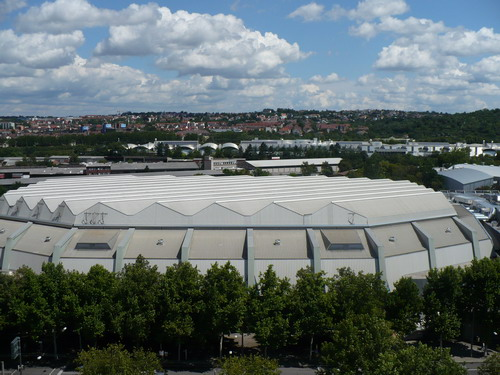
- The host stadium – the Hanns-Martin-Schleyer-Halle
- Date: Early February
- Location: Stuttgart, Germany
- Event type: Indoor track and field
- Established: 1987
- Website: Sparkassen Cup

The Sparkassen Cup was an annual indoor track and field competition which takes place in February in Stuttgart, Germany. The meeting was first held at the Hanns-Martin-Schleyer-Halle in 1987 and is currently an IAAF Indoor Permit Meeting. After 25 years the last edition of the meeting took place in 2011 because the main sponsor ended its involvement.

At each meeting, the two male and female athletes deemed to have given the best performance each receive the Sparkassen Cup – a metal figurine of a man or a woman respectively. The recipients are often those who have broken records at the meeting. Indeed, Hicham El Guerrouj's 1997 run in the 1500 metres and Meseret Defar's winning time for the 3000 metres in 2007 remain world records on the indoor track.

== World records ==
Over the course of its history, 11 world records have been set at the Sparkassen Cup.

World records set at the Sparkassen Cup
Year	Event	Record	Athlete	Nationality
1987	300 m	32.51	Anthony McKay	United States
1991	5000 m	15:13.72	Uta Pippig	Germany
1992	400 m	45.02	Danny Everett	United States
1996	3000 m	7:30.72	Haile Gebrselassie	Ethiopia
1997	1500 m	3:31.18	Hicham El Guerrouj	Morocco
1998	60 m	6.41	Maurice Greene	United States
2000	1000 m	2:15.25	Wilson Kipketer	Kenya
2002	3000 m	8:29.15	Berhane Adere	Ethiopia
2002	Pole vault	4.71 m	Svetlana Feofanova	Russia
2004	5000 m	14:39.29	Berhane Adere	Ethiopia
2007	3000 m	8:23.72	Meseret Defar	Ethiopia

== Meeting records ==
=== Men ===
Men's meeting records of the Sparkassen Cup
Event	Record	Athlete	Nationality	Date	Ref.	Video
60 m	6.41	Maurice Greene	United States	1 February 1998		
200 m	20.48 (Note: by World Athletics source; 20.47 by former meeting website)	John Regis	United Kingdom	5 February 1995		
300 m	32.51	Anthony McKay	United States	1 February 1987		
400 m	45.02	Danny Everett	United States	2 February 1992		
800 m	1:44.71	Joseph Mwengi Mutua	Kenya	4 February 2004		
1000 m	2:15.25	Wilson Kipketer	Denmark	6 February 2000		
1500 m	3:31.18	Hicham El Guerrouj	Morocco	2 February 1997		
3000 m	7:27.80	Yenew Alamirew	Ethiopia	5 February 2011		
5000 m	13:31.02	Aïssa Belaout	Algeria	6 February 1994		
50 m hurdles	6.45	Anier García	Cuba	7 February 1999		
60 m hurdles	7.36	Dayron Robles	Cuba	2 February 2008		
High jump	2.32 m	Ralf Sonn	Germany	4 February 1990		
High jump	2.32 m	Hendrik Beyer	Germany	6 February 1994		
Pole vault	5.88 m	Björn Otto	Germany	3 February 2007		
Long jump	8.34 m	Llewellyn Starks	United States	2 February 1992		
Triple jump	17.29 m	Yoelvis Quesada	Cuba	2 February 1997		
Shot put	20.45 m	Karsten Stolz	West Germany	1 February 1987		
4 × 100 m relay	40.16	Tobias Unger; Marius Broening; Alexander Kosenkow; Martin Keller	Germany	5 February 2011		

=== Women ===
Women's meeting records of the Sparkassen Cup
Event	Record	Athlete	Nationality	Date	Ref.
60 m	7.04	Irina Privalova	Russia	2 February 1992	
60 m	7.04	Sevatheda Fynes	Bahamas	6 February 2000	
200 m	22.36	Irina Privalova	Russia	2 February 1992	
400 m	50.73	Charity Opara	Nigeria	1 February 1998	
800 m	1:58.78	Ludmila Formanová	Czechoslovakia	7 February 1999	
1000 m	2:35.66	Maria Mutola	Mozambique	7 February 1999	
1500 m	4:04.88	Kutre Dulecha	Ethiopia	7 February 1999	
Mile	4:23.90	Gabriela Szabo	Romania	6 February 2000	
3000 m	8:23.72	Meseret Defar	Ethiopia	3 February 2007	
5000 m	14:39.29	Berhane Adere	Ethiopia	4 February 2004	
60 m hurdles	7.72	Susanna Kallur	Sweden	2 February 2008	
High jump	2.04 m	Blanka Vlašić	Croatia	7 February 2009	
Pole vault	4.71 m	Svetlana Feofanova	Russia	3 February 2002	
Long jump	7.13 m	Heike Drechsler	Germany	6 February 1994	
Triple jump	14.78 m	Rodica Mateescu-Petrescu	Romania	1 February 1998	
Shot put	20.47 m	Claudia Losch	West Germany	31 January 1988	
