= Harry Nickerson =

American criminal and murderer (1962–1993)

- Undated photograph of Nickerson (Note: Possibly a mug shot from June 20, 1978)
- Born: Harry Nile Nickerson; January 9, 1962; Wheeling, West Virginia, U.S.
- Died: August 31, 1993 (aged 31); Santa Clara, California, U.S.
- Other name: "Nicky"

Harry Nile Nickerson (January 9, 1962 – August 31, 1993) was an American criminal and murderer from San Jose, California.

On June 2, 2025, Nickerson was announced to have been the perpetrator of the 1978 murder of 26-year-old schoolteacher Diane Peterson, in which he was a prime suspect for decades. The murder took place at Branham High School in San Jose. He could not be convicted, as he committed suicide in 1993.

== Early life ==
Nickerson was born on January 9, 1962, in Wheeling, West Virginia, to Doris Jean Lucas (d. 1993) and Glen William Nickerson (d. 2018). He had an older brother named Glen William "Buddy" Nickerson Jr., an older sister named Glenna, and another brother named Richard. According to retired San Jose police officer Richard Boone, the Nickersons were a notorious and violent family, adding: "We were always going out there on 415s, which was [code for] a family disturbance".

Harry Nickerson dropped out of school in the eighth grade, choosing to lead a life of crime instead. He was also reported to have had a "mean temper".

== Murder of Diane Peterson ==
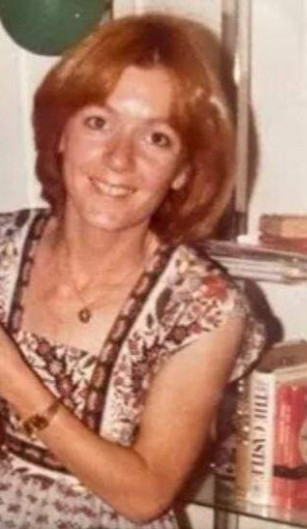
Diane Peterson, c. 1970s

Diane Peterson was an English teacher at Branham High School in San Jose, and was married with an infant son. In 1978, she was scheduled to be laid off due to low enrollment at the school.

On June 16, the day after school had concluded for the summer, Peterson was cleaning her classroom. Shortly after noon, a student discovered Peterson lying unconscious in the hallway a short distance from her room, with a single stab wound to the chest. Other contemporary reports claimed that she stumbled to the school's main corridor while shouting for help before collapsing. She was pronounced dead en route to Good Samaritan Hospital.

=== Investigation ===
==== 1978–1984 ====
According to initial reports, there was no physical evidence left at the crime scene. She had not been sexually assaulted, and robbery was also ruled out as a motive, as her purse was left behind.

On the day of her murder, seniors were boarding buses on the other side of the campus for a trip to Disneyland. One lead alleged that a young, stocky man with "broken teeth" was seen running from the grounds around the time Peterson was stabbed.

In 1978, Nickerson was 16 years old. He did not attend Branham but was considered a long-time suspect in the case. Four days after the incident, he was arrested for an unrelated crime; after police speculated that he was involved in the killing, Nickerson "spontaneously accused the police of trying to 'pin' the murder on him" and "denied killing Diane and denied owning a knife".

After the murder, an unnamed witness told police that Nickerson had confessed to the crime and that he was seen carrying a knife that had "Teacher Dear" written on it, but this was unable to be verified. He also bore a resemblance to a composite sketch, which was based on eyewitness accounts. In 1983, the parents of an ex-student told police that their son had witnessed Nickerson commit the murder, but the son denied this. The following year, another witness came forward and told police that Nickerson had confessed to killing Peterson after she spotted him in the process of a drug deal.

==== 2023–2025 ====
In 2023 and 2024, extensive examinations of DNA evidence left at the crime scene were unable to identify a suspect.

In 2025, investigators learned that moments after the murder, Nickerson had confessed to a relative at their home that he was the perpetrator. They interviewed the relative who was "emotional" and appeared to be "relieved after having kept [the] secret for almost 50 years". Charges were not pressed against the woman, with the district attorney's office of Santa Clara County, California, adding that it was "reasonable to surmise it was [kept secret] out of fear of retaliation".

On June 2, the office concluded that Nickerson was the murderer of Peterson. Rob Baker, a prosecutor with the county's cold case unit, added that the relative "demonstrat[ed] unique knowledge about the crime that could have only come from someone who spoke with the killer". The motive was not established, but detectives leaned towards a theory that she had witnessed a drug deal, due to comments from an alleged witness.

== Later crimes ==
From the 1970s onward, Nickerson was arrested for crimes such as kidnapping, armed robbery, and assault with a deadly weapon. He was suspected to have been involved in six armed robberies, and he stabbed a bouncer in 1981.

On August 6, 1984, Nickerson attempted to rob the home of John C. Evans, a 29-year-old drug dealer in San Jose, with a sawed-off shotgun. After a struggle, Nickerson was shot and left paralyzed from the waist down. Following his release from Santa Clara Valley Medical Center, he was charged with burglary, false imprisonment, and being an ex-felon in possession of a firearm. Evans and the Nickersons had run in the same circles due to their lifestyles but eventually had a falling out prior to the robbery attempt.

Nickerson's older brother Glen was arrested in September for allegedly entering the same home, handcuffing Evans and 30-year-old Mickie Lee King, and fatally shooting both of them in the back of the head. Prosecutors claimed that it was revenge for what had happened to Harry the month prior. He maintained that he was innocent and was released from prison in 2003 after the Santa Clara County district attorney's office decided to not pursue a new trial, following years of pressure from Glen Nickerson and his lawyers.

== Death ==
Nickerson was found dead from a self-inflicted gunshot wound on August 31, 1993, aged 31.
