= Cambrian, San Jose =

Cambrian Cambrian Park
- Neighborhood of San Jose; Census-designated place (partially)
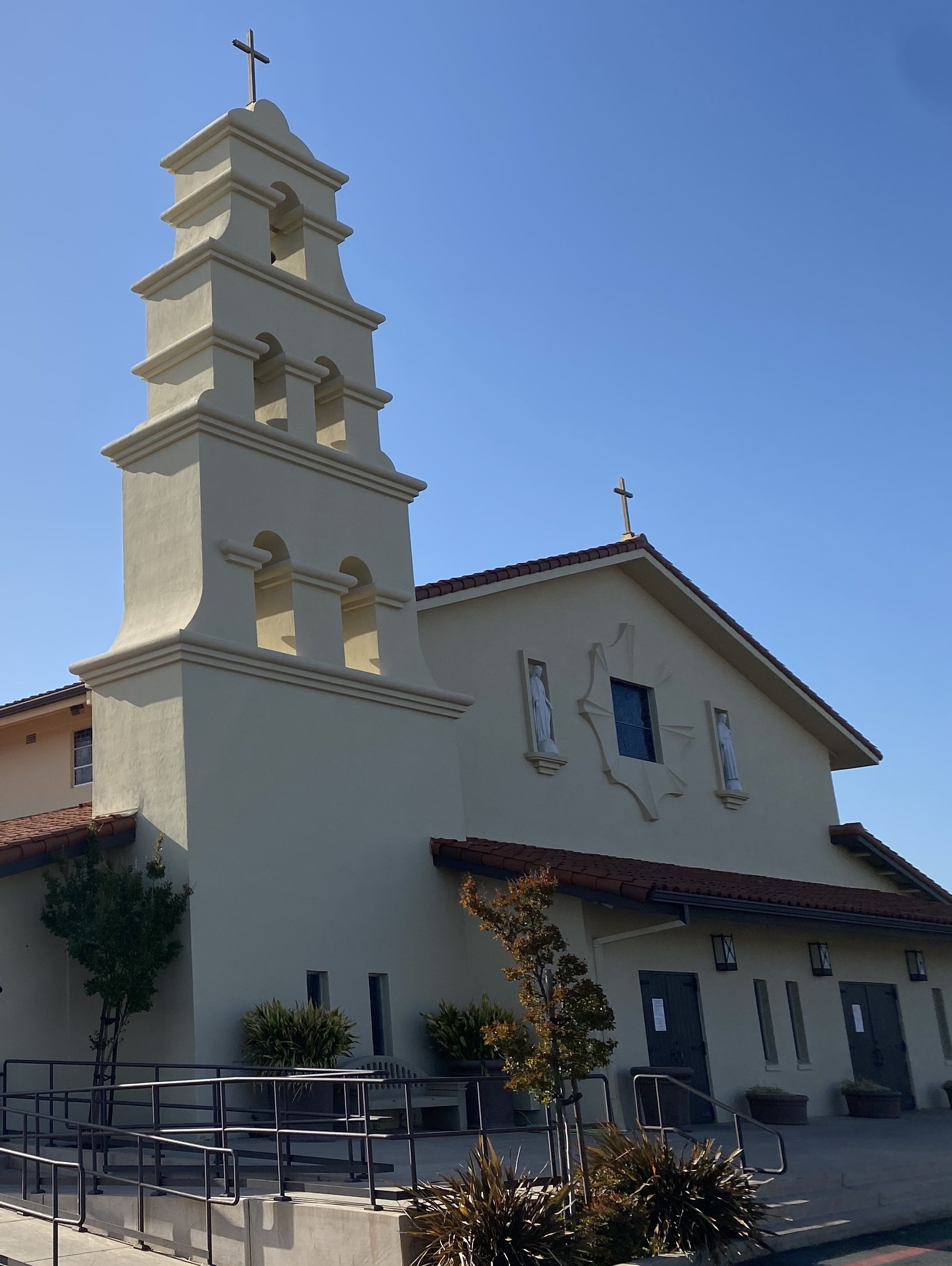
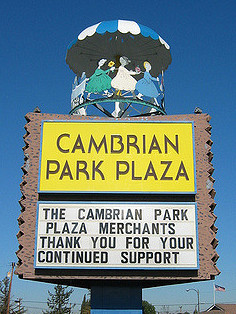
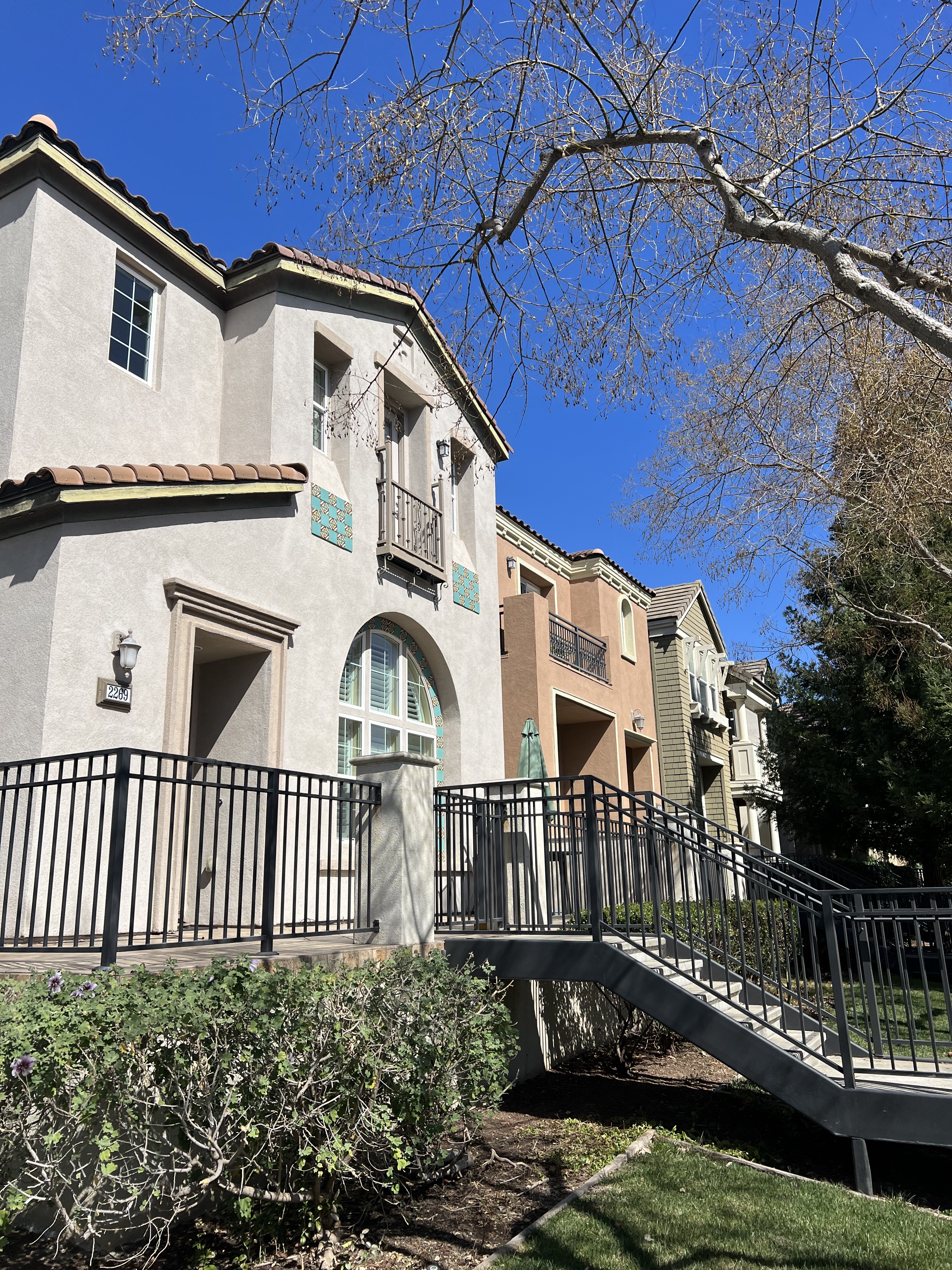
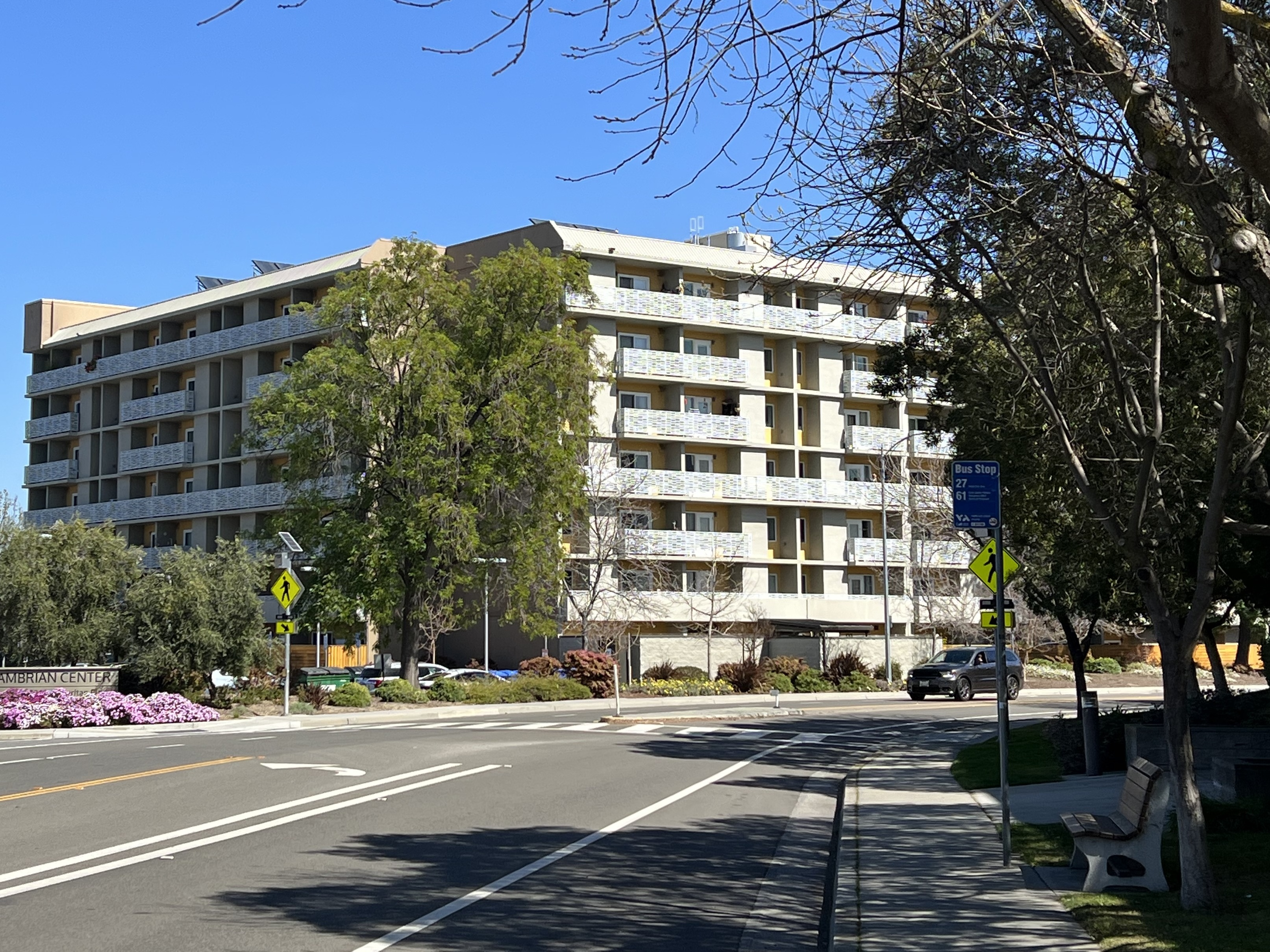
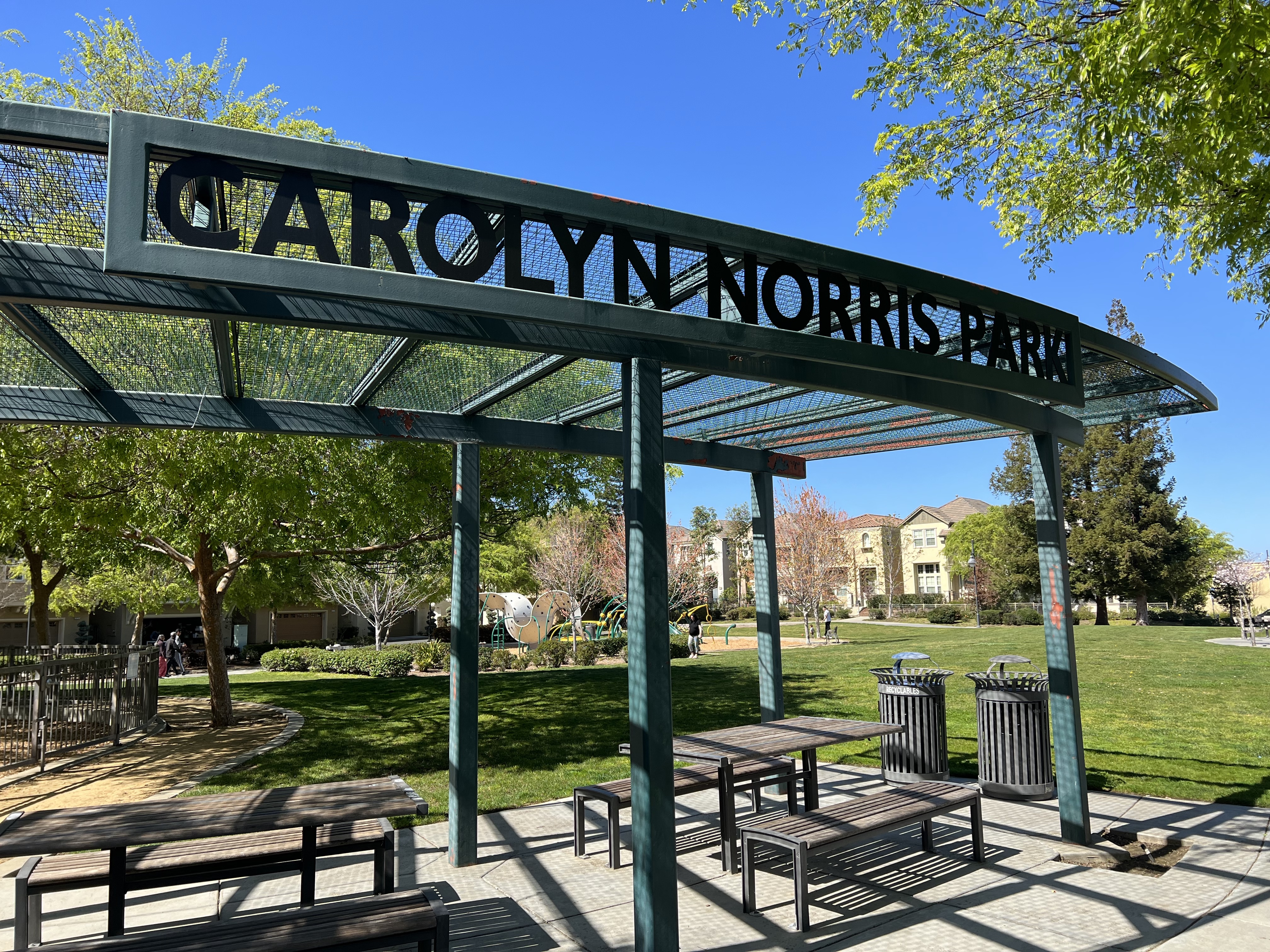
- Clockwise from top left: St. Frances Cabrini Church, Cambrian Park Plaza Carousel, townhomes on Samaritan Dr., Carolyn Norris Park, Cambrian Center.

- Location of Cambrian Park in Santa Clara County, California.

- Location within San Jose
- Coordinates: 37°15′20″N 121°55′44″W
- Country: United States
- State: California
- County: Santa Clara

Area
  - Total: 0.61 sq mi (1.58 km^{2})
  - Land: 0.61 sq mi (1.58 km^{2})
  - Water: 0 sq mi (0.00 km^{2}) 0%
- Elevation: 236 ft (72 m)

Population (2020)
  - Total: 3,719
  - Density: 6,095.3/sq mi (2,353.42/km^{2})
- Time zone: UTC-8 (Pacific (PST))
  - Summer (DST): UTC-7 (PDT)
- ZIP code: 95124
- Area code: 408
- FIPS code: 06-10088

Cambrian is a neighborhood of San Jose, California, United States, located in South San Jose. Though most of the neighborhood is incorporated as part of San Jose, a small portion exists as an unincorporated census-designated place called Cambrian Park.

== History ==
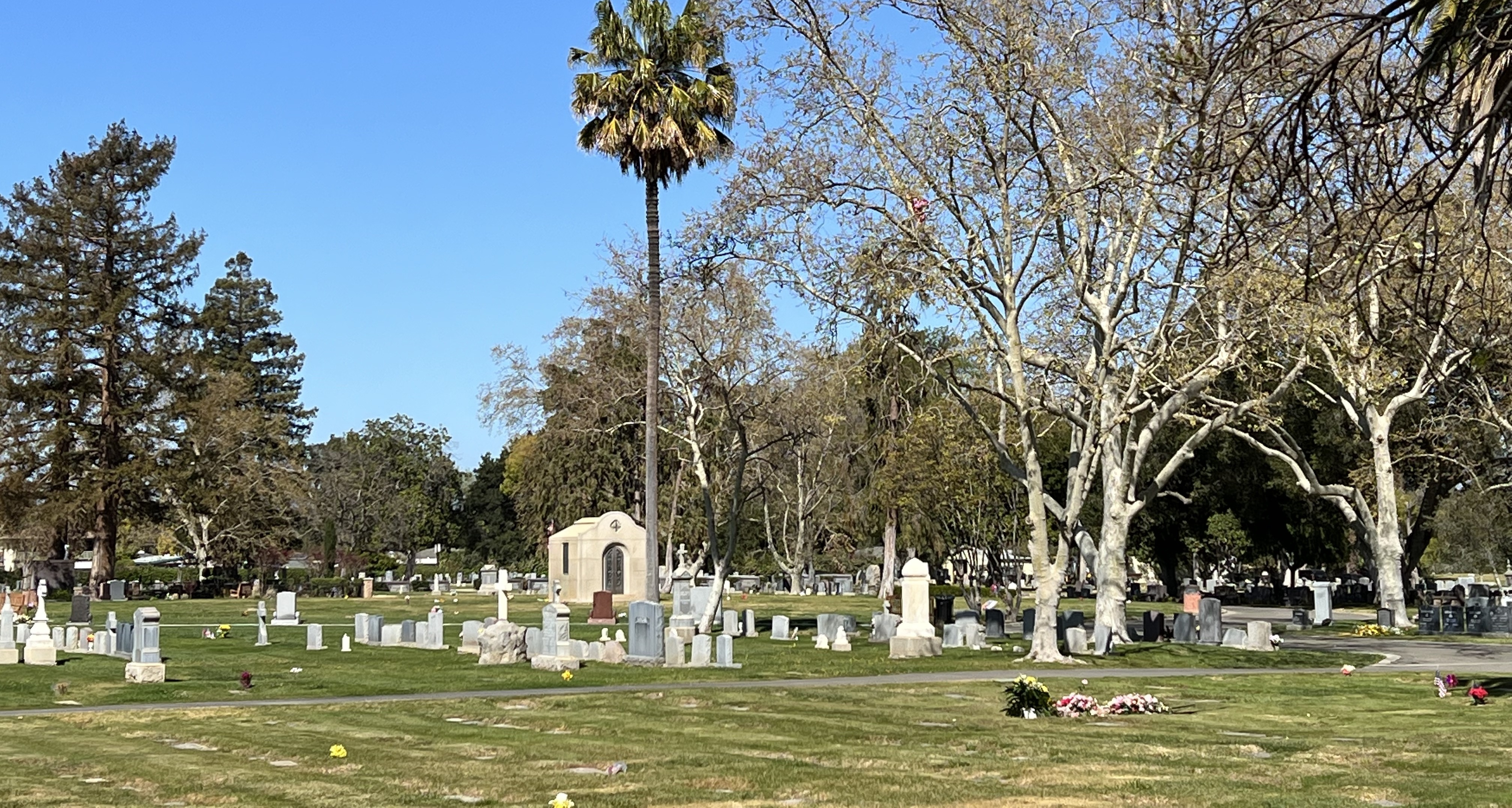
Est. 1889, Los Gatos Memorial Park is located in San Jose's Cambrian neighborhood and not in Los Gatos.

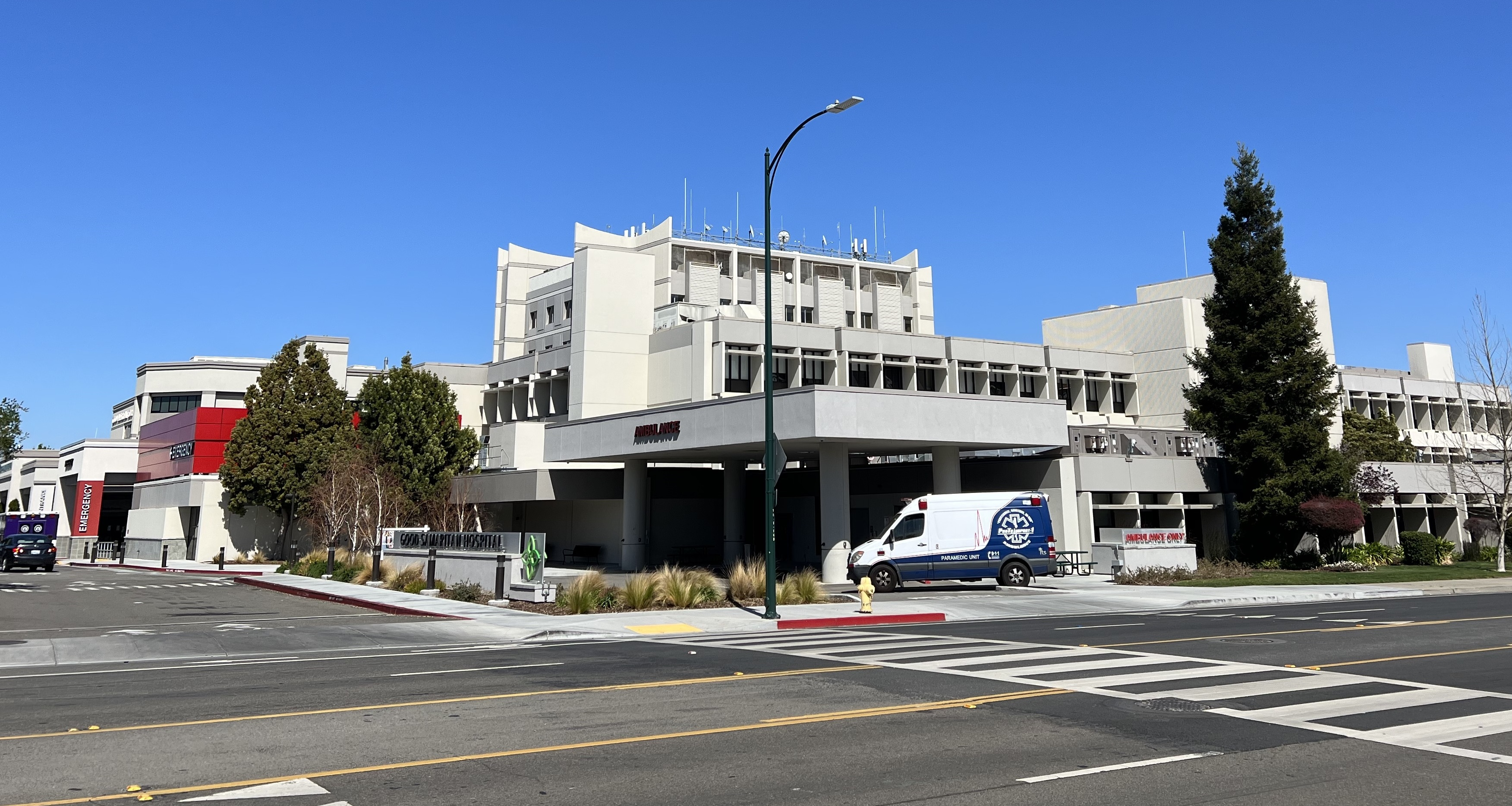
Good Samaritan Hospital, est. 1965.

The name "Cambrian Park" was used regularly since the 1950s by the then San Jose Mercury and San Jose News newspapers (now The San Jose Mercury News) to refer to a portion of the Union school and Cambrian school areas, the latter school named in the 1870s by ranch hand David Lewis of the Jeremiah D. Casey Ranch for Cambria, the is the Latin name for Wales (Welsh, Cymru), the country of Lewis's birth. Due to the relative isolation of adjacent population centers within then rural Santa Clara County, place names and later, municipalities, were often defined by their public school service boundaries. These indistinct boundaries persisted until WWII, after which a rapidly expanding population and demand for municipal services resulted in more precise boundaries being established. The Cambrian Park area continues to be recognized as a distinct, partly unincorporated neighborhood bordering the cities of San Jose and Campbell and the town of Los Gatos.

We and Our Neighbors Clubhouse was established in the adjacent Union School District area in 1892, "...to promote social ties, intellectual and cultural pursuits, charitable deeds, and recreation for the farm families of the neighborhood." Their clubhouse, built in 1910, is a San Jose Historic Landmark and appears in the National Register of Historic Places.

The commerce center for the Cambrian Park area has always been the Cambrian Park Plaza. Located at the crossroads of Camden and Union Avenues, the center was originally built in 1953. Today the center maintains the country charm and construction style, across over 170,000 square feet of stores. Through the years, the center has housed a mix of local shops and national brands. The iconic colorful carousel atop the center sign is a historical landmark. This is of particular interest in the community as the center was sold for the first time ever in 2015, to Texas-based Weingarten Realty.

== Geography ==
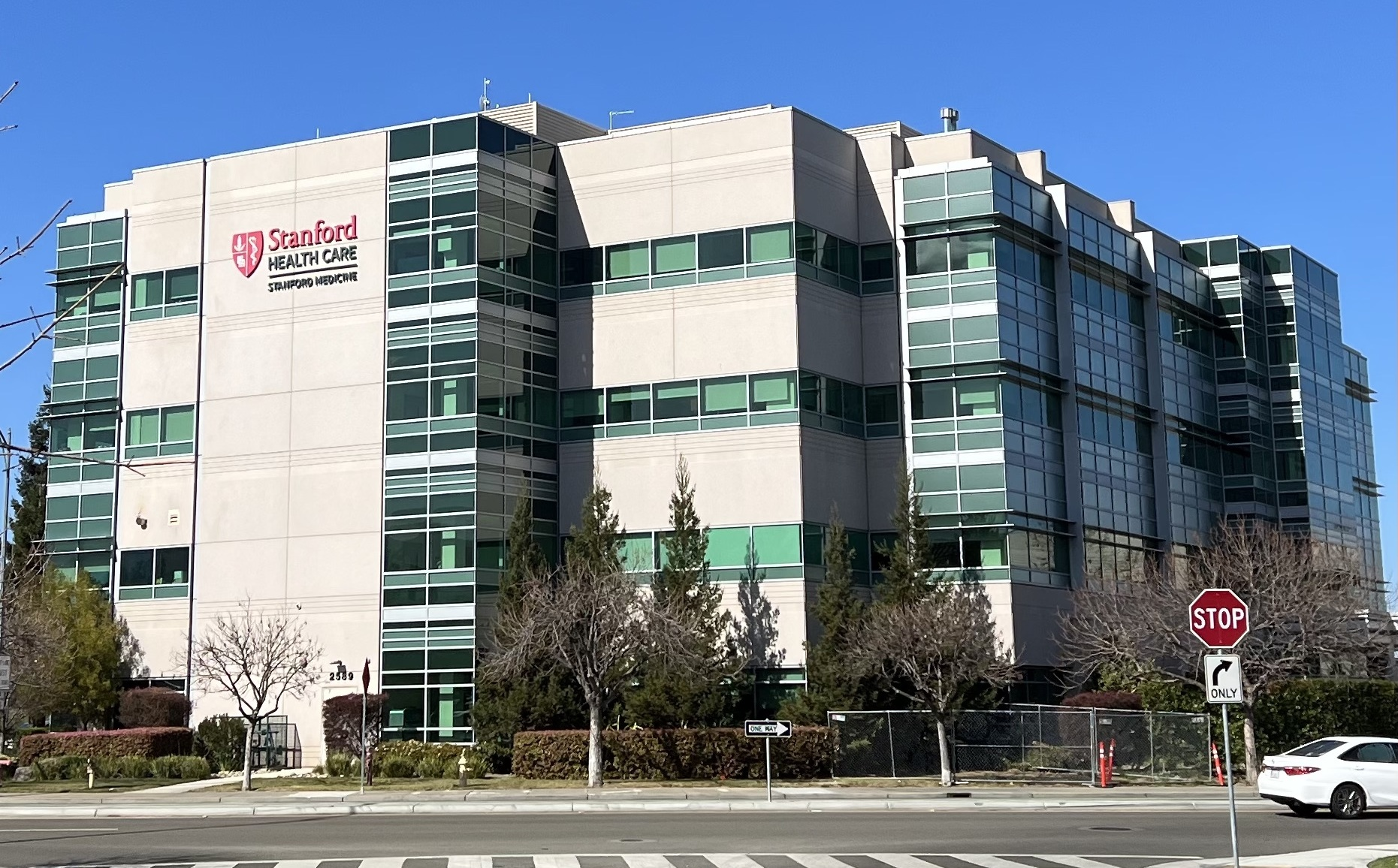
Stanford Cancer Center.

Cambrian Park is located at 37°15′20″N 121°55′44″W (37.255593, −121.928915).

Cambrian is located in the South San Jose region of the city. Willow Glen is to its north, Los Gatos is to its south and west, Campbell is to its northwest, and Almaden is to its east.

Most of Cambrian lies within San Jose's city limits, though a small portion is an unincorporated county pocket. A large swath of the pocket was annexed by the City of Campbell in 2012, under an agreement with the City of San Jose, while the rest will eventually be annexed by San Jose. According to the United States Census Bureau, the CDP had a total area of 0.6 square miles (1.6 km^{2}), all of it land.

== Demographics ==
Historical population
Census	Pop.	Note	%±
1990	2,998		—
2000	3,258		8.7%
2010	3,282		0.7%
2020	3,719		13.3%
U.S. Decennial Census; 1850–1870 1880-1890; 1900 1910 1920; 1930 1940 1950; 1960 1970 1980; 1990 2000 2010

These figures do not include any part of Cambrian Park which has been incorporated into San Jose at the time of the census.

=== 2020 ===
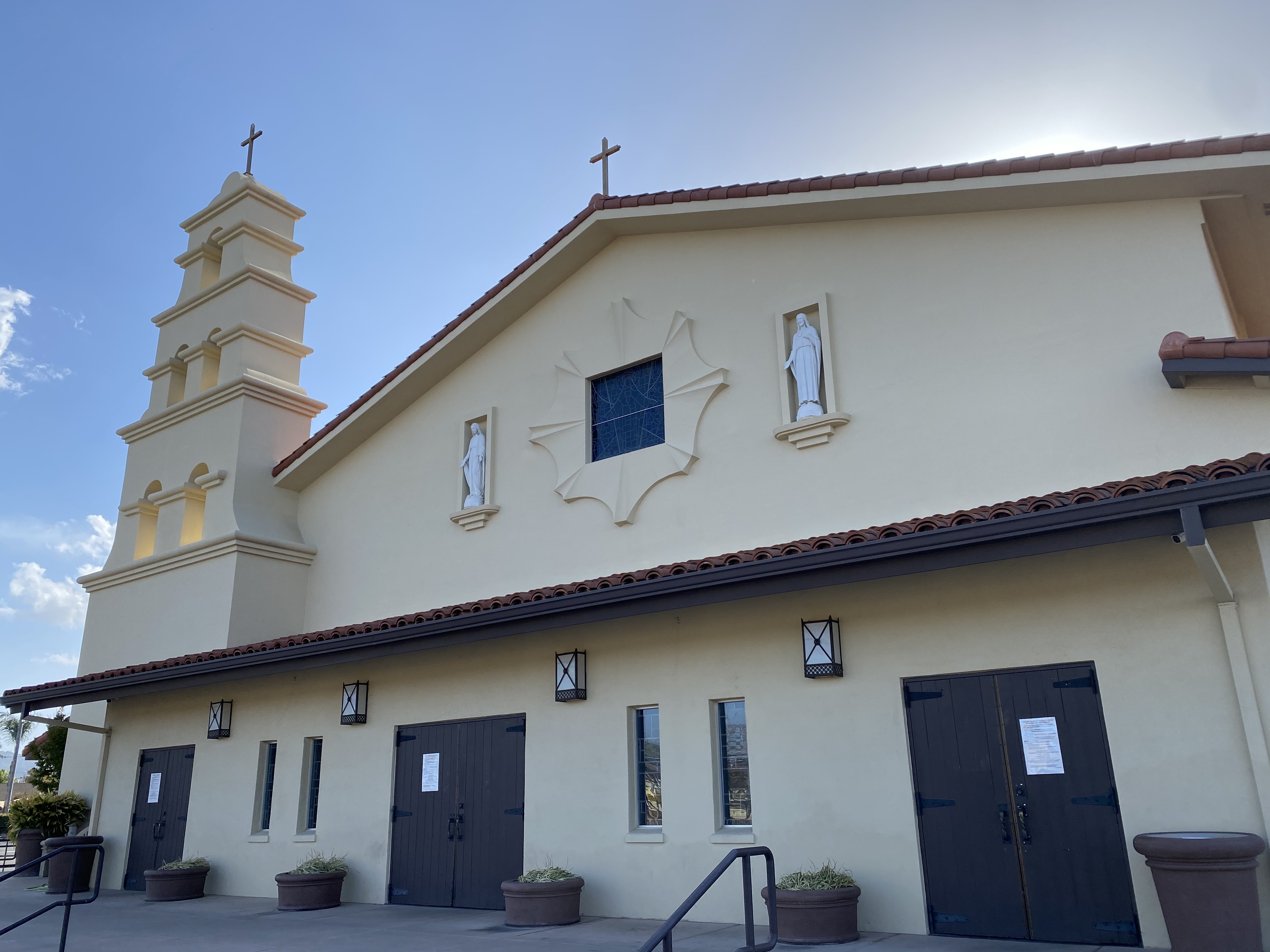
St. Frances Cabrini Church, built in 1963 in a Mission Revival style.

The 2020 United States census reported that Cambrian Park had a population of 3,719. The population density was 6,096.7 inhabitants per square mile (2,353.9/km^{2}). The racial makeup of Cambrian Park was 57.5% White, 1.5% African American, 0.9% Native American, 20.5% Asian, 0.2% Pacific Islander, 6.1% from other races, and 13.3% from two or more races. Hispanic or Latino of any race were 16.8% of the population.

The census reported that 98.7% of the population lived in households, 0.9% lived in non-institutionalized group quarters, and 0.4% were institutionalized.

There were 1,180 households, out of which 40.9% included children under the age of 18, 67.2% were married-couple households, 4.9% were cohabiting couple households, 15.3% had a female householder with no partner present, and 12.5% had a male householder with no partner present. 12.4% of households were one person, and 6.8% were one person aged 65 or older. The average household size was 3.11. There were 963 families (81.6% of all households).

The age distribution was 24.9% under the age of 18, 7.0% aged 18 to 24, 22.3% aged 25 to 44, 30.2% aged 45 to 64, and 15.6% who were 65 years of age or older. The median age was 42.4 years. For every 100 females, there were 96.3 males.

There were 1,209 housing units at an average density of 1,982.0 units per square mile (765.3 units/km^{2}), of which 1,180 (97.6%) were occupied. Of these, 80.2% were owner-occupied, and 19.8% were occupied by renters.

In 2023, the US Census Bureau estimated that the median household income was $89,049, and the per capita income was $53,560. About 9.6% of families and 9.8% of the population were below the poverty line.

=== 2010 ===
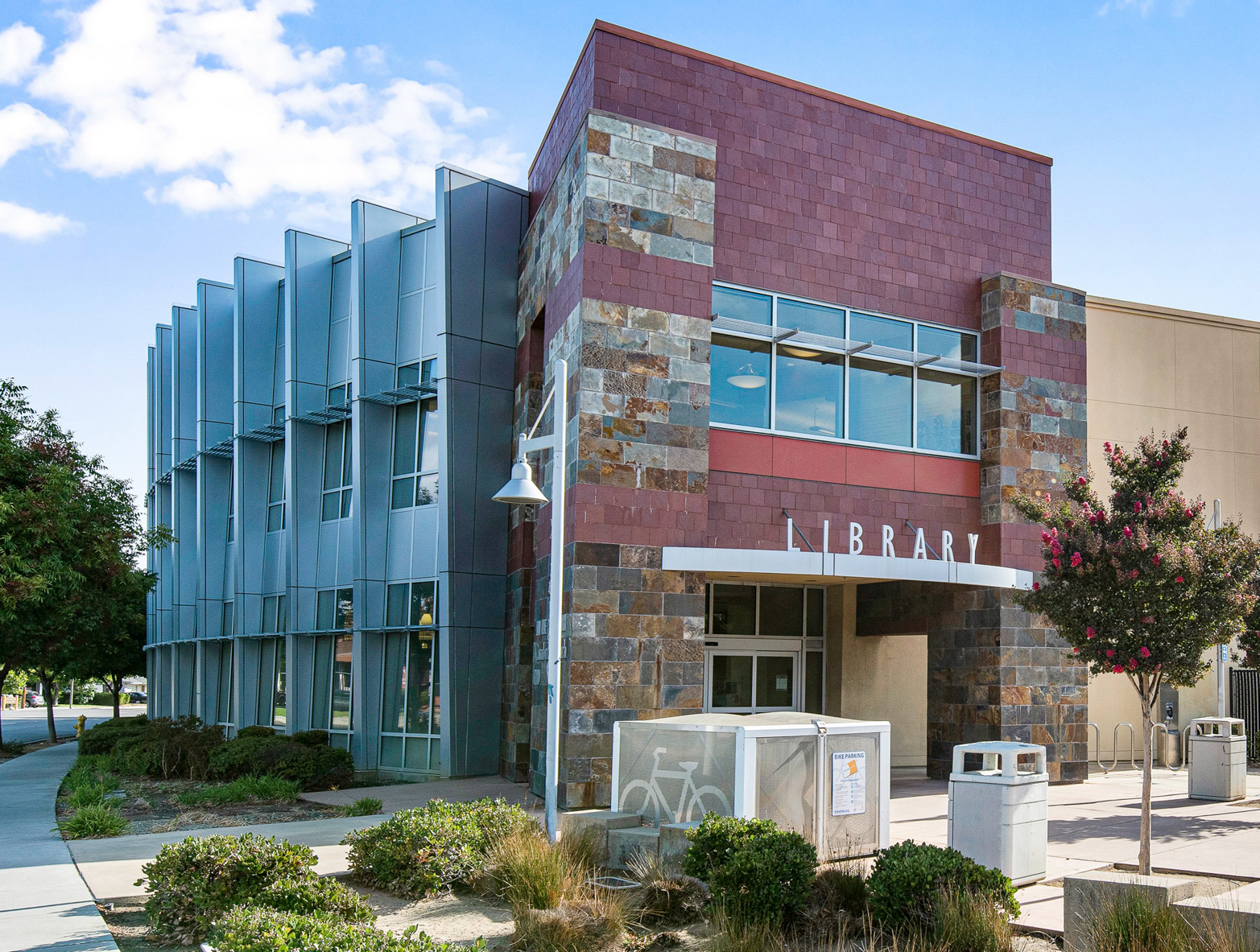
Cambrian Branch Library of the San José Public Library

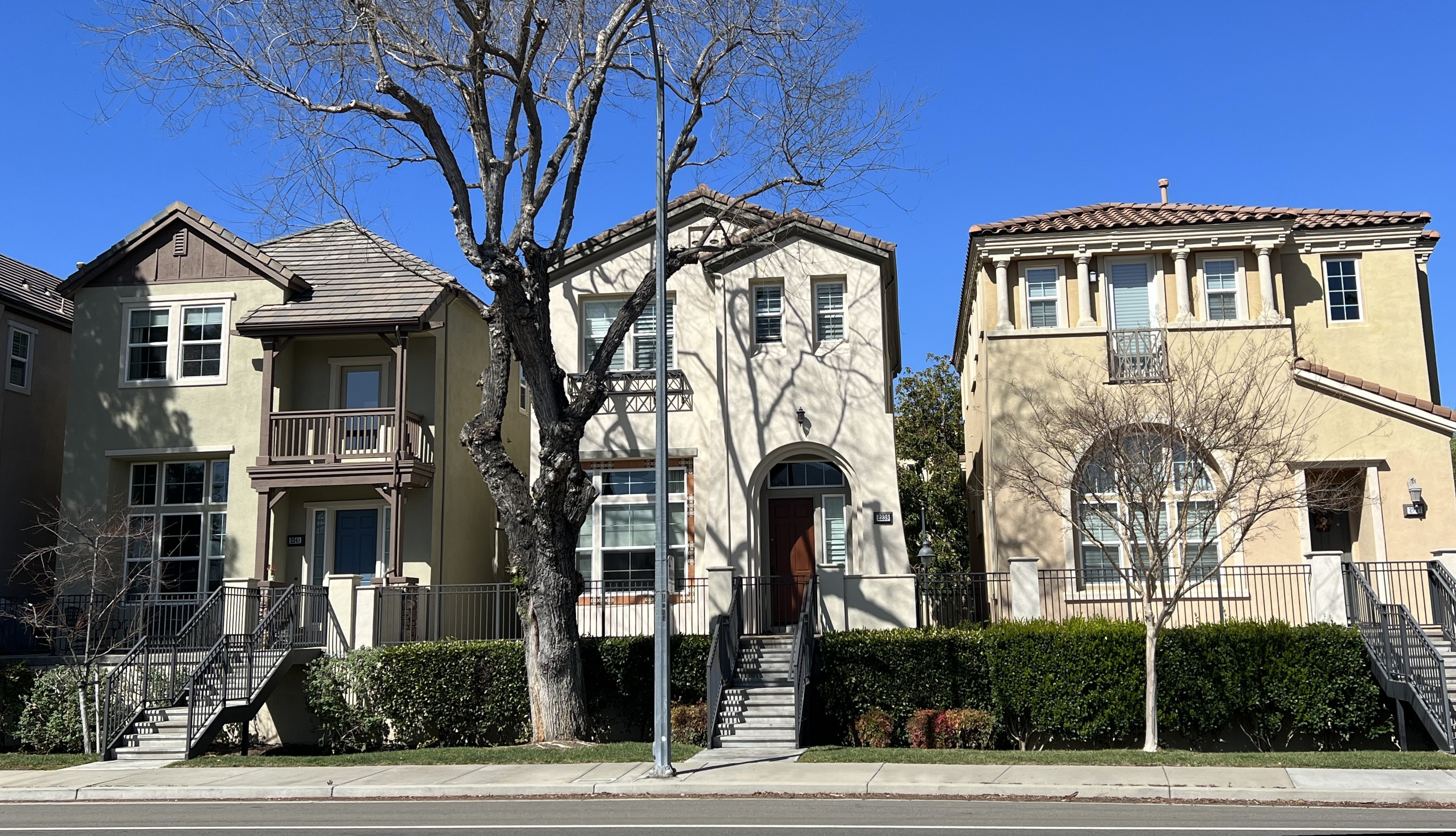
Townhomes in Cambrian.

The 2010 United States census reported that Cambrian Park had a population of 3,282. The population density was 5,503.8 inhabitants per square mile (2,125.0/km^{2}). The racial makeup of Cambrian Park was 2,598 (79.2%) White, 26 (0.8%) African American, 29 (0.9%) Native American, 221 (6.7%) Asian, 19 (0.6%) Pacific Islander, 190 (5.8%) from other races, and 199 (6.1%) from two or more races. Hispanic or Latino of any race were 591 persons (18.0%).

The Census reported that 3,268 people (99.6% of the population) lived in households, 3 (0.1%) lived in non-institutionalized group quarters, and 11 (0.3%) were institutionalized.

There were 1,141 households, out of which 439 (38.5%) had children under the age of 18 living in them, 670 (58.7%) were opposite-sex married couples living together, 122 (10.7%) had a female householder with no husband present, 67 (5.9%) had a male householder with no wife present. There were 57 (5.0%) unmarried opposite-sex partnerships, and 10 (0.9%) same-sex married couples or partnerships. 206 households (18.1%) were made up of individuals, and 88 (7.7%) had someone living alone who was 65 years of age or older. The average household size was 2.86. There were 859 families (75.3% of all households); the average family size was 3.25.

The population was spread out, with 789 people (24.0%) under the age of 18, 231 people (7.0%) aged 18 to 24, 775 people (23.6%) aged 25 to 44, 1,080 people (32.9%) aged 45 to 64, and 407 people (12.4%) who were 65 years of age or older. The median age was 42.4 years. For every 100 females, there were 101.1 males. For every 100 females age 18 and over, there were 102.2 males.

There were 1,179 housing units at an average density of 1,977.1 per square mile (763.4/km^{2}), of which 909 (79.7%) were owner-occupied, and 232 (20.3%) were occupied by renters. The homeowner vacancy rate was 0.8%; the rental vacancy rate was 4.1%. 2,621 people (79.9% of the population) lived in owner-occupied housing units and 647 people (19.7%) lived in rental housing units.

There have been plans made in 2018 to remodel and modernize the Cambrian Park Plaza. Hundreds of townhouses and apartments, a couple of hotels, a convalescent home, a town square and a small park would mix with stores and shops at the renovated Cambrian Park Plaza shopping center, according to recently unveiled preliminary design plans.

== Education ==
A portion of Cambrian Park census-designated place is in the Cambrian School District, while another portion is in the Union School District. Both operate elementary and middle schools.

For high school, all of Cambrian Park is in the Campbell Union High School District.

Schools in Cambrian include:

- Leigh High School
- Branham High School
- The former Camden High School was located in the neighborhood but was closed and the property sold in 1980.
