= Cambrian School District =

School district in San Jose, California, United States

Address
- 4115 Jacksol Drive San Jose, California, 95124; United States

District information
- Type: Public
- Grades: K–8
- NCES District ID: 0607140

Students and staff
- Students: 3,172 (2020–2021)
- Teachers: 139.52 (FTE)
- Staff: 96.07 (FTE)
- Student–teacher ratio: 22.74:1

Other information
- Website: www.cambriansd.org

The Cambrian School District is a school district based in the Cambrian district of San Jose, California. It operates four elementary schools (K-5), one middle school (6-8) and one alternative school. As of the 2011–12 fiscal year, the district has 142.8 full-time equivalent teachers serving 3,324 students.

School Facts
School name	Students	FTE Teachers	Pupil/Teacher Ratio
Bagby Elementary School	657	32	20.5
Fammatre Charter Elementary School	486	22	22.1
Farnham Elementary School	430	24	17.9
Ida Price Middle School	973	45	21.6
Sartorette Elementary School	495	24	20.6
Steindorf STEAM Magnet School	490	21	21:1

Note: Based on 2006-07 school year data
