= Robertson Daniel =

American football player (born 1991)

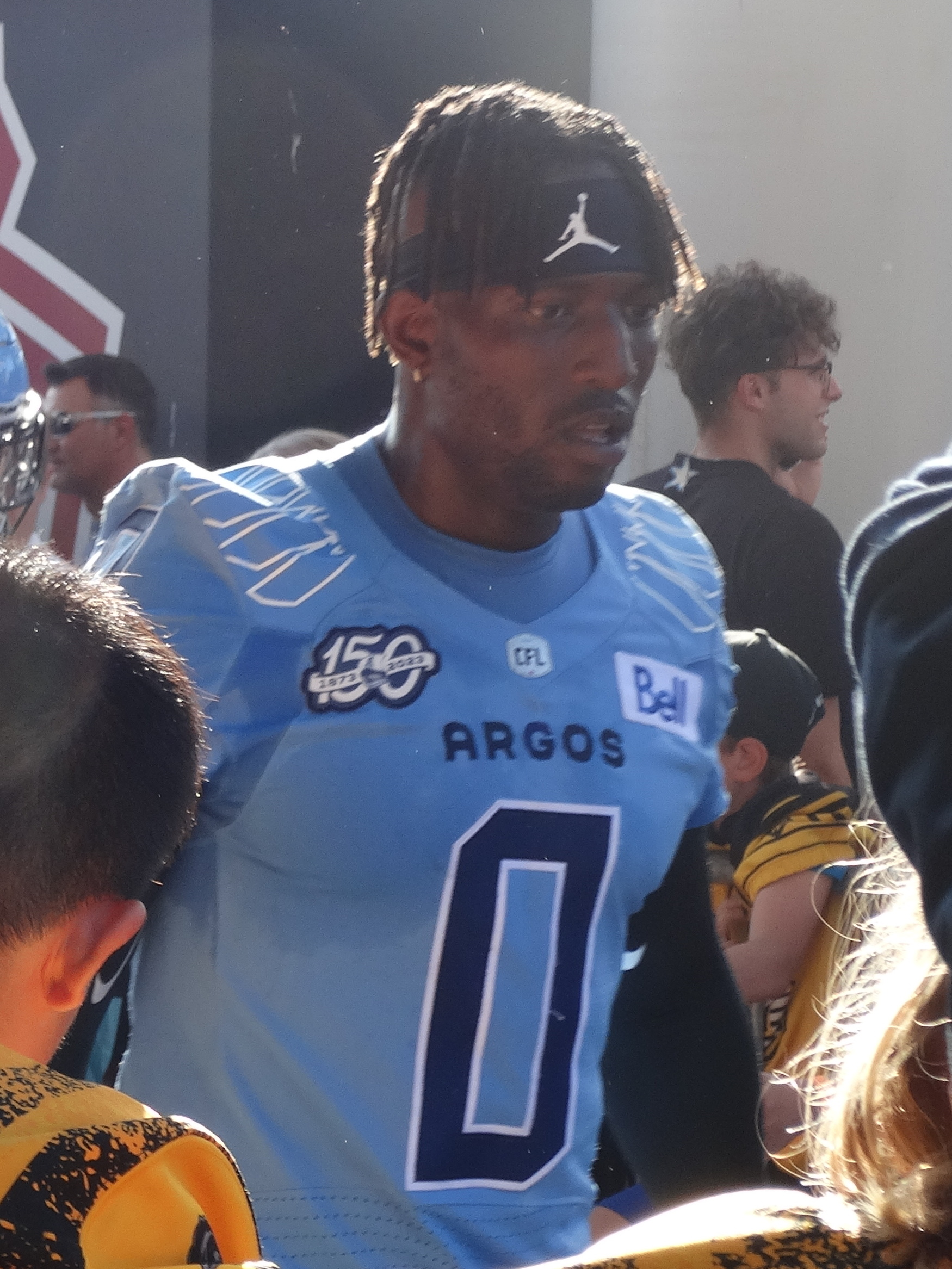
- Daniel with the Toronto Argonauts in 2023

No. 40, 31
- Position: Defensive back

Personal information
- Born: October 1, 1991 (age 35); St. Thomas, U.S. Virgin Islands
- Listed height: 6 ft 1 in (1.85 m)
- Listed weight: 205 lb (93 kg)

Career information
- High school: Branham (San Jose, California)
- College: BYU
- NFL draft: 2015: undrafted

Career history
- Oakland Raiders (2015)*; Green Bay Packers (2015–2016); Washington Redskins (2016)*; Baltimore Ravens (2016–2018); Calgary Stampeders (2019–2020); Toronto Argonauts (2021–2023)
- * Offseason or practice squad member only

Awards and highlights
- Grey Cup champion (2022); CFL All-Star (2023); CFL East All-Star (2023); Most tackles in a game by an Argonauts player (16 on August 24, 2023)

Career NFL statistics
- Games played: 2
- Stats at Pro Football Reference
- Stats at CFL.ca

Robertson DeShawn Daniel (born October 1, 1991) is an American former professional football player who was a defensive back in the National Football League (NFL) and Canadian Football League (CFL). He played college football for the BYU Cougars. Daniel was signed by the NFL's Oakland Raiders as an undrafted free agent in 2015. He was also a member of the Green Bay Packers, Washington Redskins, and Baltimore Ravens of the NFL and the Calgary Stampeders and Toronto Argonauts of the CFL.

== Early life ==
Robertson DeShawn Daniel was born on October 1, 1991, in Saint Thomas, U.S. Virgin Islands. He attended Branham High School in San Jose, California.

== College career ==
Daniel attended Brigham Young University, where he played for coach Bronco Mendenhall's BYU Cougars football team in 2013 and 2014 after transferring from De Anza College. He finished his two-year BYU career with totals of 110 tackles and three interceptions.

== Professional career ==
Pre-draft measurables
Height	Weight	40-yard dash	10-yard split	20-yard split	20-yard shuttle	Three-cone drill	Vertical jump	Broad jump	Bench press
6 ft 1 in (1.85 m)	209 lb (95 kg)	4.46 s	1.64 s	2.61 s	4.21 s	6.87 s	35.5 in (0.90 m)	10 ft 6 in (3.20 m)	24 reps
All values are from Pro Day

=== Oakland Raiders ===
After going undrafted in the 2015 NFL draft, Daniel signed with the Oakland Raiders on May 8, 2015. On September 1, 2015, he was waived by the Raiders.

=== Green Bay Packers ===
On September 7, 2015, Daniel was signed to the Green Bay Packers' practice squad. He was promoted from the practice squad to the active roster on January 15, 2016. However, Daniel was inactive for the Packers' divisional playoff game against the Arizona Cardinals the following day.

He was released by the Packers during final team cuts on September 3, 2016. On September 22, 2016, Daniel was signed to the Packers' practice squad. He was released from the Packers' practice squad on September 27, 2016.

=== Washington Redskins ===
On October 3, 2016, Daniel was signed to the Washington Redskins' practice squad. He was released from the Redskins' practice squad on October 11, 2016.

=== Baltimore Ravens ===
Daniel was signed to the Baltimore Ravens' practice squad on October 13, 2016. On October 22, 2016, he was promoted from the practice squad to the active roster. He was released by the Ravens on November 5, 2016 and was re-signed to the practice squad. He signed a reserve/future contract with the Ravens on January 5, 2017.

On September 2, 2017, Daniel was waived/injured by the Ravens and placed on injured reserve. He was released on September 7, 2017. He was re-signed to the practice squad on December 5, 2017. He signed a reserve/future contract with the Ravens on January 2, 2018. He was waived by the Ravens on May 3, 2018.

On August 27, 2018, Daniel was re-signed by the Ravens, only to be waived four days later. He was re-signed to the practice squad on September 3, 2018. He was promoted to the active roster on September 22, 2018, but was waived two days later and re-signed back to the practice squad. He signed a reserve/future contract with the Ravens on January 8, 2019. He was waived on May 6, 2019.

=== Calgary Stampeders ===
On May 25, 2019, Daniel signed with the Calgary Stampeders of the Canadian Football League (CFL) to a two-year contract. He played in eight regular season games where he recorded 21 defensive tackles, six special teams tackles, and three interceptions. He did not play in 2020 due to the cancellation of the 2020 CFL season.

=== Toronto Argonauts ===
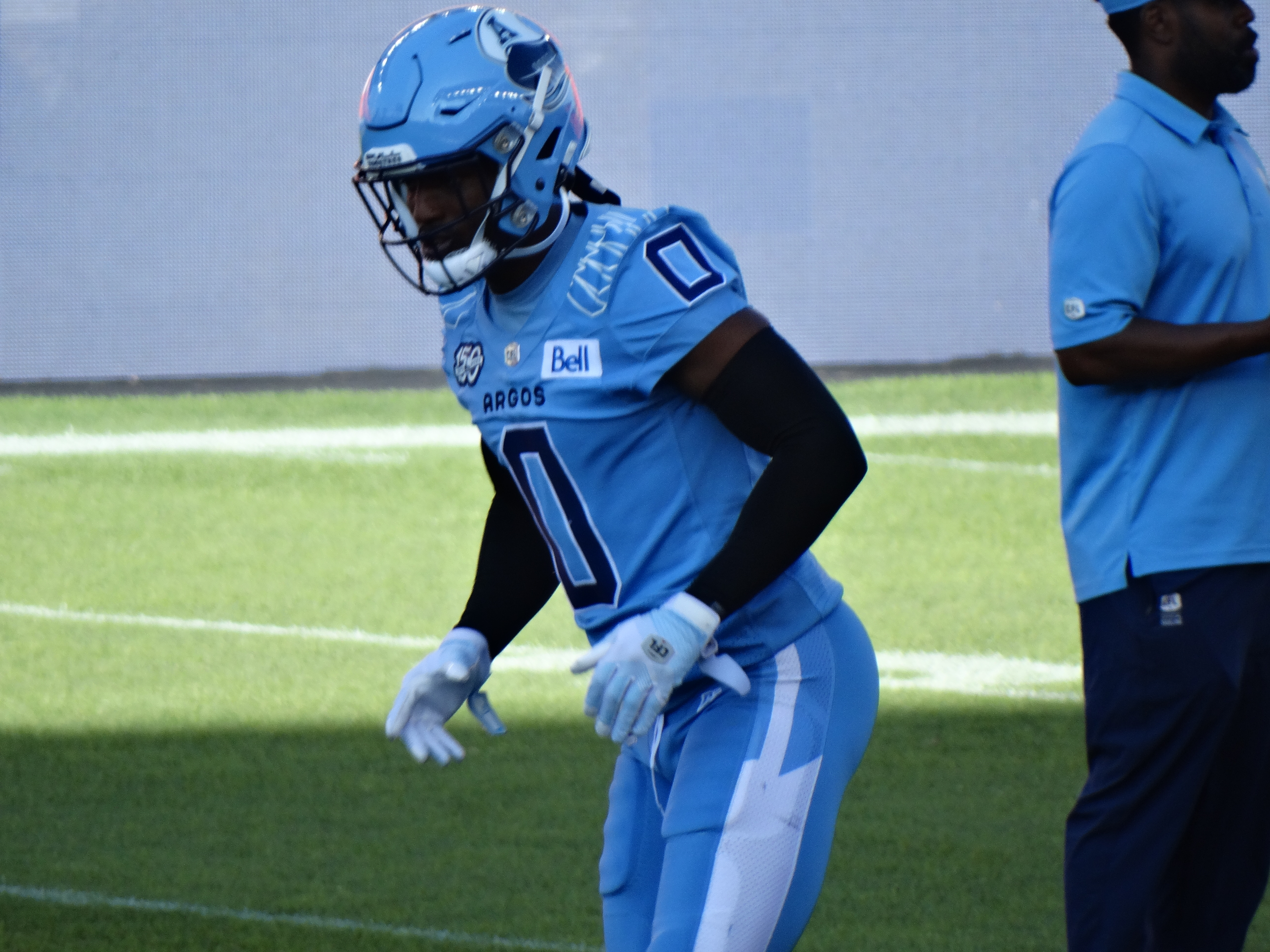
Daniel with the Argonauts in 2023

As a pending free agent entering the 2021 CFL season, Daniel's playing rights were traded to the Toronto Argonauts on January 31, 2021. He re-signed with the Argonauts three days later.

On August 4, 2023, Daniel set a new Argonauts record for most tackles in a game with 16 in a 20–7 loss vs. the Stampeders in Calgary. He played in 11 regular season games in 2023 where he recorded 55 defensive tackles, two sacks, four interceptions, and one touchdown. Daniel was named a CFL East All-Star at the end of the season, despite missing the last seven games due to injury. He became a free agent upon the expiry of his contract on February 13, 2024.

== Career statistics ==
=== NFL ===
Source: NFL.com

Year	Team	G	GS	Tackles					Interceptions						Fumbles	
Year	Team	G	GS	Total	Solo	Ast	Sck	SFTY	PDef	Int	Yds	Avg	Lng	TDs	FF	FR
2016	BAL	1	0	0	0	0	0.0	0	0	0	0	0.0	0	0	0	0
2018	BAL	1	0	0	0	0	0.0	0	0	0	0	0.0	0	0	0	0
Total		2	0	0	0	0	0.0	0	0	0	0	0.0	0	0	0	0

=== College ===
Source: BYUCougars.com

Year	Team	G	GS	Tackles					Interceptions						Fumbles	
Year	Team	G	GS	Total	Solo	Ast	Sck	SFTY	PDef	Int	Yds	Avg	Lng	TDs	FF	FR
2013	BYU	13	12	66	49	17	1.0	0	9	2	29	14.5	29	0	2	0
2014	BYU	12	10	44	38	6	0.0	0	14	1	32	32.0	32	0	1	2
Total		25	22	110	87	23	1.0	0	23	3	61	20.3	32	0	3	2
