= Branham High School =

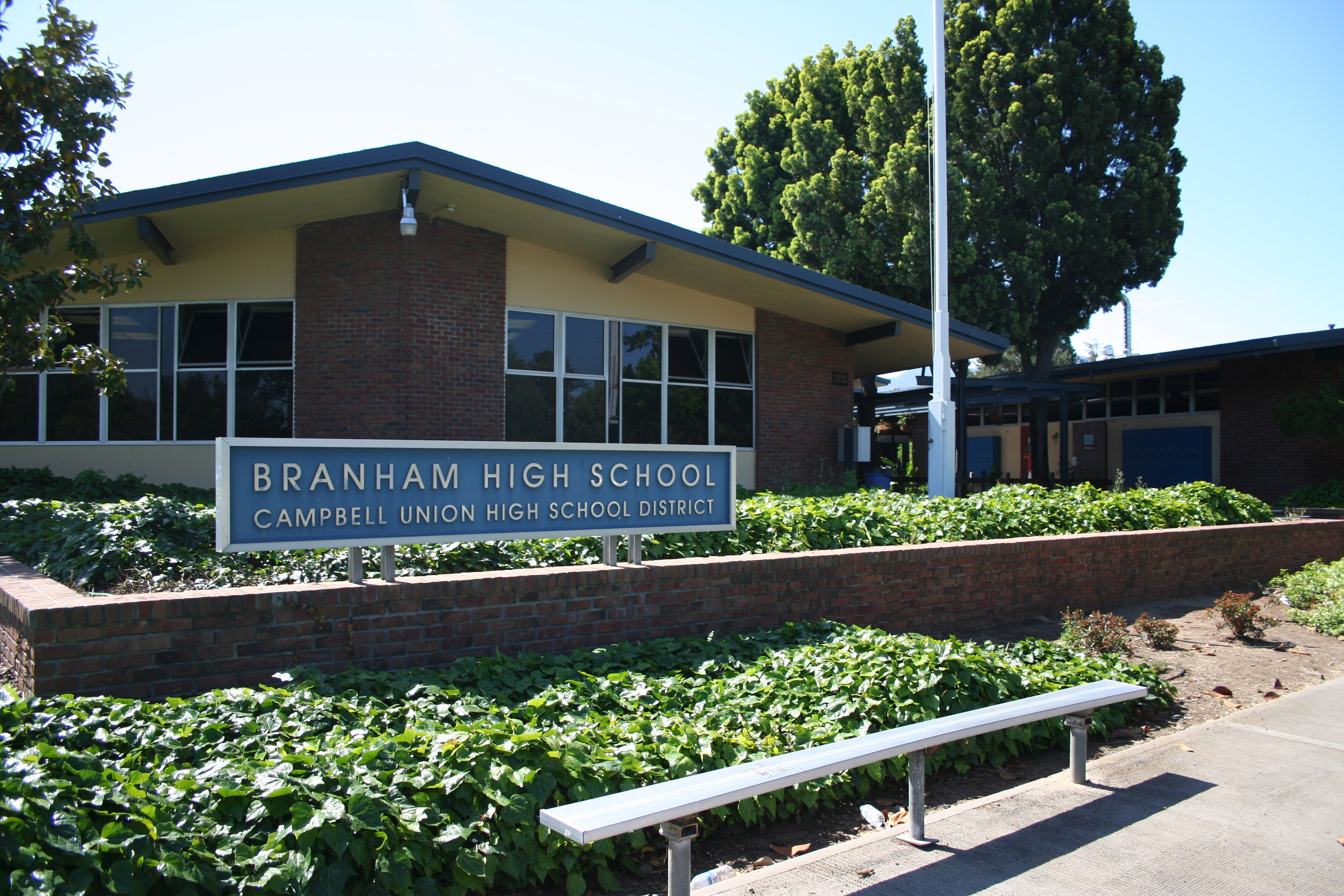

Location
- 1570 Branham Lane; San Jose, California 95118; United States; 37°15′12″N 121°53′59″W

Information
- Type: Public
- Established: September 13, 1967 (59 years ago)
- School district: Campbell Union High School District
- Principal: Beth Silbergeld
- Staff: 84.07 (FTE)
- Grades: 9–12
- Enrollment: 1,820 (2024–2025)
- Student to teacher ratio: 21.65
- Colors: Navy, Columbia blue and white
- Mascot: Bruin
- Rival: Leigh High School
- Accreditation: Western Association of Schools and Colleges
- Website: branham.cuhsd.org

Branham High School is a high school in San Jose, California, located in the Branham-Kirk neighborhood within the Southwest San Jose region. It originally opened on September 13, 1967, under the Campbell Union High School District (CUHSD) before closing in 1991. The District leased the campus to Valley Christian Schools in 1991. The school was reopened by CUHSD in 1999 due to increased enrollment within the district.

It is named after Isaac Branham, a Californian pioneer who became a successful farmer and lumber mill owner.

The colors of Branham High School are navy blue, Columbia blue, and white, and the official mascot is the Bruin.

== Academics ==
=== Accreditation ===
Branham was awarded the title of California Distinguished School during the 2006–2007 school year and was fully accredited by the Western Association of Schools and Colleges in March 2022.

=== AP courses ===
Branham participates in the College Board's Advanced Placement program and, as of the 2021–2022 school year, offers AP courses in the following: English Language and Composition, English Literature and Composition, World History: Modern, US History, American Government, Biology, Chemistry, Environmental Science, Physics 1 & 2, Psychology, Calculus AB & BC, Statistics, French Language & Culture, Spanish Language and Culture, Spanish Literature and Culture, Chinese Language and Culture, Computer Science A and Principles, Studio Art 2D & 3D, and Art History.

== Athletics ==
Branham High School is a member of the Blossom Valley Athletic League (BVAL).

Branham fields teams in football, flag football, basketball, baseball, volleyball, swimming and diving, cheerleading, tennis, badminton, soccer, softball, track and field, cross country, golf, field hockey, and wrestling. All of Branham's league and section championships are displayed in its gymnasium, the Bruin Den.

== Music and theater departments ==
=== Music department ===
The Branham High School Music Department consists of the vocal music department and the instrumental music department. The choir is made up of Madrigals and Women's. The instrumental music program is made up of Field Marching Band, Color Guard, Parade Band, Pep Band, Symphonic Band, Wind Ensemble, Guitar, Winter Percussion Ensemble, and Jazz Ensemble.

The marching band has recently been named the Branham High School Royal Alliance.

The Branham High School Symphonic Band, in its first CMEA performance in the history of the school, received a Unanimous Superior rating, the highest rating a group can receive from the California Music Educators Association. In addition, the band was invited to perform at Carnegie Hall and Chicago Symphony Hall due to their performance at the 2009 Los Angeles Heritage Festival, where they had placed first in the Symphonic Band category. In April 2011, the band received its second Unanimous Superior rating from CMEA.

The Branham High School Royal Alliance Marching Band and Color Guard is known for award-winning performances and had an undefeated season in the fall of 2019 with their show “It’s About Time”.

The Branham Jazz Ensemble gives nearly a dozen public performances per year and travels to the Columbia Jazz Festival. The Jazz Ensemble hosts a yearly fundraiser called the Jazz Cafe to raise funds for the Branham Instrumental Program. As of March 2022, the director of the band program is Christopher Nalls, while the director of the choir program is Barbara West.

=== Theater department ===
The department earned the 2001 Glenn Hoffman Award for Outstanding Fine Arts Curriculum. In 2003, the program earned the 2003 High School Musical Honors Award for Outstanding Ensemble.

The department currently offers a full theater curriculum including a musical theater course, a drama club, and several productions each year. Its annual faculty musical is directed by students and supervised by the acting instructor.

== Career Technical Education (CTE) courses ==
The Career Technical Education courses offered at Branham currently include Culinary Arts, Journalism, Yearbook, and PLTW (Project Lead the Way).

The journalism class is known for its award-winning newspaper, the Bear Witness, which has been named a National Scholastic Press Association Pacemaker winner in 2018, 2019 and 2020. It has earned second place in Social Media reporting in 2020 and 2021.

== Diane Peterson ==
The school was the site of a 1978 stabbing murder of a teacher, Diane Peterson, that went unsolved until 2025, when a family member of the murderer came forward. The assailant was a then 16-year-old who had since died.

== Antisemitism ==
Branham staff and students have twice made international headlines due to acts of Anti-Zionism and Antisemitism. The first instance was in April 2025, when an investigation by the California Department of Education concluded that Branham teachers had presented lessons about the Israeli–Palestinian conflict that were biased against the state of Israel.

In December 2025, 8 Branham students posed for a photo of a "human swastika" on the school's football field. One of the students posted the image on Instagram, captioned with a quote from Hitler's 30 January 1939 speech to the Reichstag. The post was removed and unspecified disciplinary action was taken against the students. The incident was cited by news outlets as an example of rising antisemitism among younger Americans, and as a byproduct of poor Holocaust education.

== Notable alumni ==
- Robertson Daniel (Class of 2010) - Former NFL cornerback for the Oakland Raiders, Green Bay Packers, Washington Football Team, and Baltimore Ravens. Played collegiately at Brigham Young University.
- Pat Hughes (Class of 1973) - Radio play-by-play announcer for the Chicago Cubs of Major League Baseball.
- Marty Krulee (Class of 1974) - Sprinter and track-and-field athlete.
- Gary Radnich (Class of 1969) - Sports anchor for KRON-TV, San Francisco. Former basketball player at Brigham Young University, later transferring to the University of Nevada, Las Vegas.
- Louie Sakoda (Class of 2005) - Professional placekicker and punter for the Edmonton Eskimos of the Canadian Football League.
- Roger Samuels (Class of 1979) - Former MLB pitcher who played for the San Francisco Giants and Pittsburgh Pirates.
- Darnell Sankey (Class of 2012) - Former NFL linebacker for the Denver Broncos, Oakland Raiders, Kansas City Chiefs, Minnesota Vikings, Baltimore Ravens, Detroit Lions, Indianapolis Colts, and New Orleans Saints. Played collegiately at California State University, Sacramento.

== See also ==
- Santa Clara County high schools
