= Good Samaritan Hospital (San Jose) =

- Hospital Corporation of America
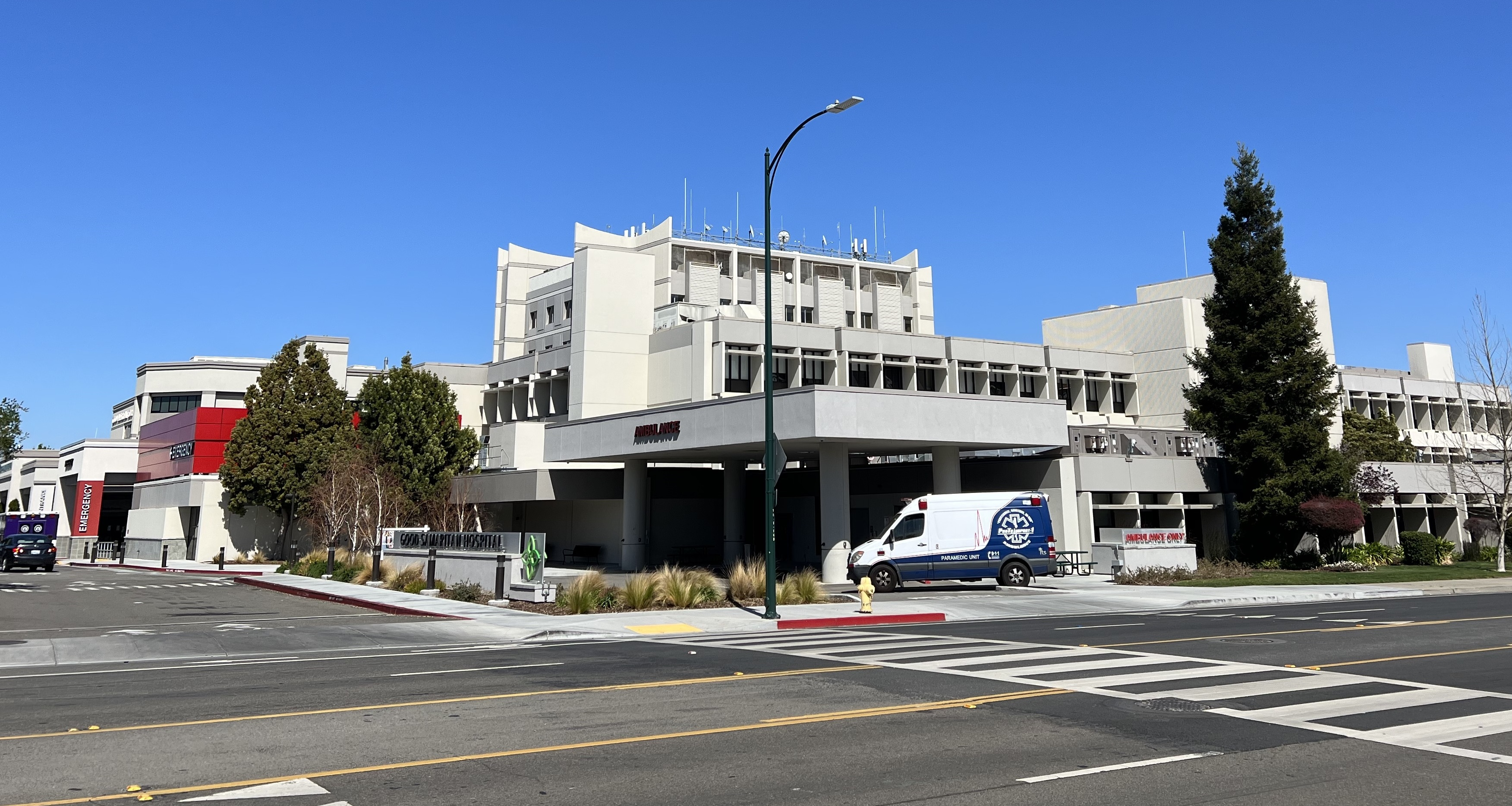

Geography
- Location: San Jose, California, United States
- Coordinates: 37°15′5″N 121°56′47″W

Services
- Emergency department: Yes
- Beds: 474

Helipads
- Helipad: Yes

History
- Founded: 1965

Links
- Website: goodsamsanjose.com
- Lists: Hospitals in California

Good Samaritan Hospital, commonly known as Good Sam, is an acute care Hospital in the Cambrian district of San Jose, California, with satellite facilities in neighboring Los Gatos. It contains centers for treatment of stroke and chest pain, as well as a large maternity ward. It has been owned by HCA since 1996.

== History ==
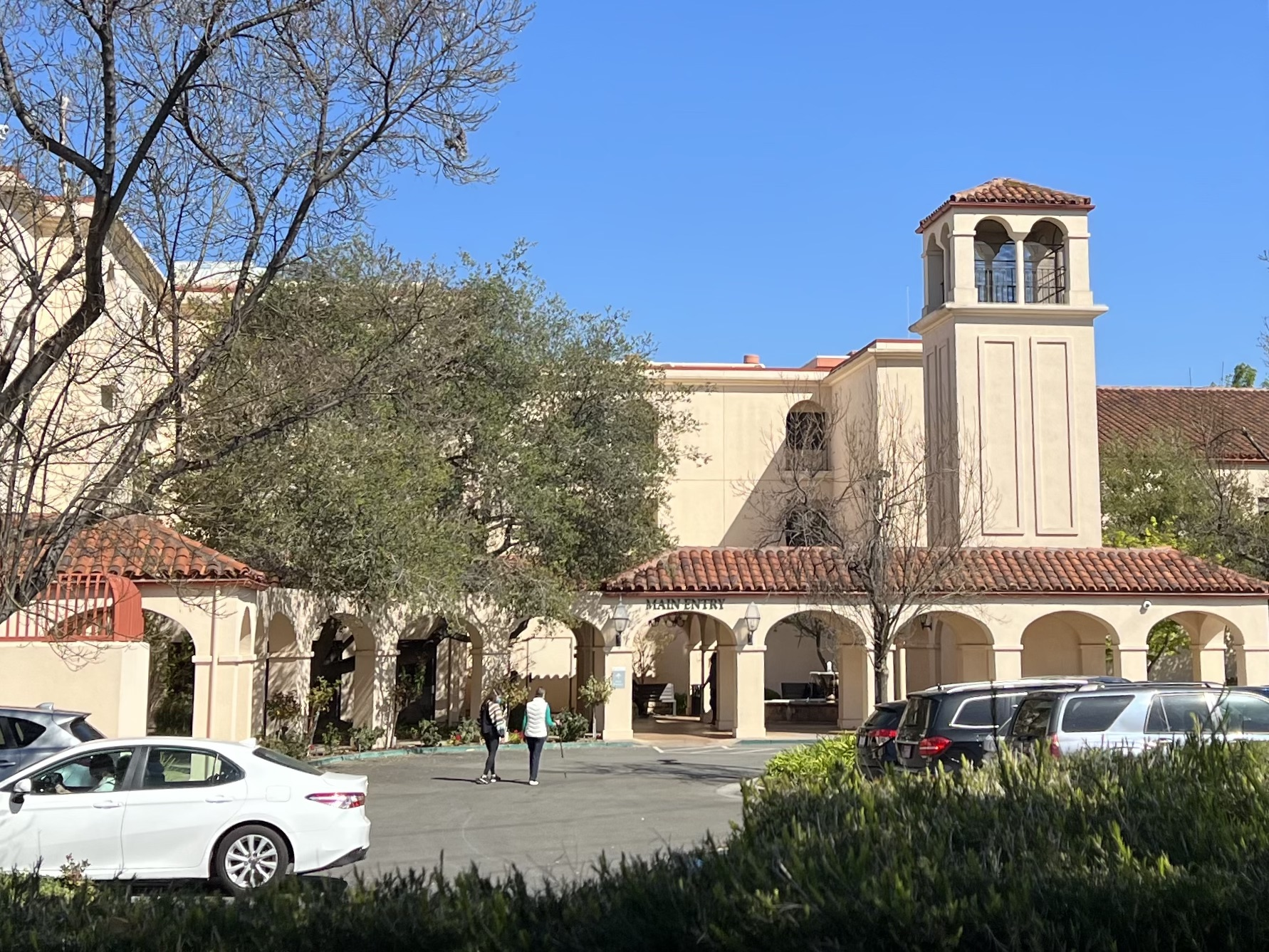
The Mission Oaks campus is a short-stay and outpatient center in Los Gatos.

Good Samaritan Health System also operated San Jose Medical Center and Gilroy's South Valley Hospital at the time of the HCA acquisition. Catholic Healthcare West bought South Valley Hospital in 1999 and relocated Saint Louise Hospital in Morgan Hill to the Gilroy location. San Jose Medical Center (503-bed) was closed in 2004. HCA acquired the Alexian Brothers Hospital in San Jose in 1998, and renamed it Regional Medical Center of San Jose.

A helipad was built in 2003.

The hospital purchased the 99-bed Mission Oaks Hospital in Los Gatos to provide short-stay services and outpatient cancer treatment.

== Accreditation ==
The hospital was one of the first five hospitals in the United States to be certified by the Joint Commission as a Primary Stroke Center. It is affiliated with Stanford University and the National Institutes of Health in this endeavor.
